= 1990 NFL draft =

National Football League draft

General information
- Date: April 22–23, 1990
- Location: New York Marriott Marquis in New York City, New York
- Network: ESPN

Overview
- 332 total selections in 12 rounds
- League: National Football League
- First selection: Jeff George, QB; Indianapolis Colts
- Mr. Irrelevant: Demetrius Davis, TE; Los Angeles Raiders
- Most selections (17): San Diego Chargers
- Fewest selections (6): Dallas Cowboys
- Hall of Famers: 6: DT Cortez Kennedy; LB Junior Seau; RB Emmitt Smith; SS LeRoy Butler; TE Shannon Sharpe; DT John Randle

The 1990 NFL draft was the procedure by which National Football League teams selected amateur college football players. It is officially known as the NFL Annual Player Selection Meeting. The draft was held April 22–23, 1990, at the Marriott Marquis in New York City, New York. The league also held a supplemental draft after the regular draft and before the regular season.

The Dallas Cowboys would have had the first overall pick in the draft for the second consecutive year by virtue of their league-worst 1–15 record in 1989. However, the Cowboys forfeited their first-round pick by selecting quarterback Steve Walsh in the first round of the previous year's supplemental draft. The first pick instead went to the Atlanta Falcons, who traded it to the Indianapolis Colts. The Colts then used the first overall pick to select quarterback Jeff George.

== Player selections ==
| Pro Bowler | Hall of Famer |

| * | Compensatory selection |
| † | Pro Bowler |
| ‡ | Hall of Famer |

Positions key
| Offense | Defense | Special teams |
|---|---|---|
| QB — Quarterback; RB — Running back; FB — Fullback; WR — Wide receiver; TE — Tight end; OL — Offensive lineman; T — Tackle; G — Guard; C — Center | DL — Defensive lineman; DT — Defensive tackle (Note: Includes nose tackle (NT)); DE — Defensive end; EDGE — Edge rusher; LB — Linebacker (Note: Includes middle linebacker (MLB/MIKE), weakside linebacker (WILL), strongside linebacker (SAM), off-ball linebacker, and outside linebacker (OLB)); DB — Defensive back; CB — Cornerback; S — Safety (Note: Includes free safety (FS) and strong safety (SS)) | K — Kicker (Note: Also known as a placekicker (PK)); P — Punter; LS — Long snapper; RS — Return specialist (Note: Includes kickoff and punt returners) |

| Rnd. | Pick | Team | Player | Pos. | College | Notes |
|---|---|---|---|---|---|---|
| 1 | – | Dallas Cowboys | Selection forfeited during the 1989 supplemental draft. (Note: Dallas forfeited a first-round selection after selecting QB Steve Walsh in the 1989 supplemental draft.) | | | |
| 1 | 1 | Indianapolis Colts | Jeff George | QB | Illinois | from Atlanta (Note: No. 1: Atlanta → Indianapolis (D). Atlanta traded first- and fourth-round selections (1st and 83rd overall) and a conditional 1991 selection to Indianapolis in exchange for a fifth-round selection (121st overall), a 1991 first-round selection, OT Chris Hinton and WR Andre Rison.) |
| 1 | 2 | New York Jets | Blair Thomas | RB | Penn State | |
| 1 | – | Phoenix Cardinals | Selection forfeited during the 1989 supplemental draft. (Note: Phoenix forfeited a first-round selection after selecting QB Timm Rosenbach in the 1989 supplemental draft.) | | | |
| 1 | 3 | Seattle Seahawks | Cortez Kennedy^{‡}^{†} | DT | Miami (FL) | from New England (Note: No. 3: New England → Seattle (D). New England traded first- and second-round selections (3rd and 29th overall) to Seattle in exchange for two first-round selections and a third-round selection (8th, 10th and 64th overall) and a 1991 fourth-round selection.) |
| 1 | 4 | Tampa Bay Buccaneers | Keith McCants | LB | Alabama | |
| 1 | 5 | San Diego Chargers | Junior Seau^{‡}^{†} | LB | USC | |
| 1 | 6 | Chicago Bears | Mark Carrier ^{†} | S | USC | |
| 1 | 7 | Detroit Lions | Andre Ware | QB | Houston | 1989 Heisman Trophy winner |
| 1 | 8 | New England Patriots | Chris Singleton | LB | Arizona | from Seattle (Note: No. 8: Seattle → New England (D). See Round 1: New England → Seattle.) |
| 1 | 9 | Miami Dolphins | Richmond Webb ^{†} | T | Texas A&M | |
| 1 | 10 | New England Patriots | Ray Agnew | DE | NC State | from Indianapolis via Seattle (Note: No. 10: Indianapolis → Seattle → New England. Multiple trades: Indianapolis → Seattle (PD). Indianapolis traded a first-round selection (10th overall) and a 1989 first-round selection to Seattle in exchange for LB Fredd Young. Seattle → New England (D). See Round 1: New England → Seattle.) |
| 1 | 11 | Los Angeles Raiders | Anthony Smith | DE | Arizona | |
| 1 | 12 | Cincinnati Bengals | James Francis | LB | Baylor | |
| 1 | 13 | Kansas City Chiefs | Percy Snow | LB | Michigan State | |
| 1 | 14 | New Orleans Saints | Renaldo Turnbull ^{†} | LB | West Virginia | |
| 1 | 15 | Houston Oilers | Lamar Lathon ^{†} | LB | Houston | |
| 1 | 16 | Buffalo Bills | James Williams | CB | Fresno State | |
| 1 | 17 | Dallas Cowboys | Emmitt Smith^{‡}^{†} | RB | Florida | from Pittsburgh (Note: No. 17: Pittsburgh → Dallas (D). Pittsburgh traded a first-round selection (17th overall) to Dallas in exchange for first- and third-round selections (21st and 81st overall).) |
| 1 | 18 | Green Bay Packers | Tony Bennett | LB | Ole Miss | from Cleveland (Note: No. 18: Cleveland → Green Bay (PD). Cleveland traded a first-round selection (18th overall), 1989 third- and fifth-round selections, and RB Herman Fontenot to Green Bay in exchange for 1989 second- and fifth-round selections.) |
| 1 | 19 | Green Bay Packers | Darrell Thompson | RB | Minnesota | |
| 1 | 20 | Atlanta Falcons | Steve Broussard | RB | Washington State | from Washington (Note: No. 20: Washington → Atlanta (PD). Washington traded a first-round selection (20th overall) and a 1989 second-round selection to Atlanta in exchange for a fifth-round selection (111th overall) and RB Gerald Riggs.) |
| 1 | 21 | Pittsburgh Steelers | Eric Green | TE | Liberty | from Minnesota via Dallas (Note: No. 21: Minnesota → Dallas → Pittsburgh Multiple trades: Minnesota → Dallas (PD). Minnesota traded first-, second- and sixth-round selections (21st, 47th and 158th overall), 1991 first- and second-round selections, 1992 first-, second- and third-round selections, LB Jesse Solomon, LB David Howard, CB Issiac Holt and DE Alex Stewart to Dallas in exchange for third-, fifth- and tenth-round selections (54th, 116th and 249th overall), 1991 third-round selection and RB Herschel Walker. Dallas → Pittsburgh (D). See Round 1: Pittsburgh → Dallas.) |
| 1 | 22 | Philadelphia Eagles | Ben Smith | CB | Georgia | |
| 1 | 23 | Los Angeles Rams | Bern Brostek | C | Washington | |
| 1 | 24 | New York Giants | Rodney Hampton ^{†} | RB | Georgia | |
| 1 | – | Denver Broncos | Selection forfeited during the 1989 supplemental draft. (Note: Denver forfeited a first-round selection after selecting RB Bobby Humphrey in the 1989 supplemental draft.) | | | |
| 1 | 25 | San Francisco 49ers | Dexter Carter | RB | Florida State | |
| 2 | 26 | Dallas Cowboys | Alexander Wright | WR | Auburn | |
| 2 | 27 | Atlanta Falcons | Darion Conner | LB | Jackson State | |
| 2 | 28 | New York Jets | Reggie Rembert | WR | West Virginia | |
| 2 | 29 | Seattle Seahawks | Terry Wooden | LB | Syracuse | from New England (Note: No. 29: New England → Seattle (D). See Round 1: New England → Seattle.) |
| 2 | 30 | Tampa Bay Buccaneers | Reggie Cobb | RB | Tennessee | |
| 2 | 31 | Phoenix Cardinals | Anthony Thompson | RB | Indiana | |
| 2 | 32 | Chicago Bears | Fred Washington | DT | TCU | |
| 2 | 33 | Chicago Bears | Ron Cox | LB | Fresno State | from San Diego (Note: No. 33: San Diego → Chicago (PD). San Diego traded a second-round selection (33rd overall) to Chicago in exchange for QB Jim McMahon.) |
| 2 | 34 | Seattle Seahawks | Robert Blackmon | S | Baylor | |
| 2 | 35 | Detroit Lions | Dan Owens | DE | USC | |
| 2 | 36 | Indianapolis Colts | Anthony Johnson | RB | Notre Dame | |
| 2 | 37 | Los Angeles Raiders | Aaron Wallace | LB | Texas A&M | |
| 2 | 38 | Cincinnati Bengals | Harold Green ^{†} | RB | South Carolina | |
| 2 | 39 | Miami Dolphins | Keith Sims ^{†} | G | Iowa State | |
| 2 | 40 | Kansas City Chiefs | Tim Grunhard ^{†} | C | Notre Dame | |
| 2 | 41 | Houston Oilers | Jeff Alm | DT | Notre Dame | |
| 2 | 42 | Buffalo Bills | Carwell Gardner | RB | Louisville | |
| 2 | 43 | Pittsburgh Steelers | Kenny Davidson | DE | LSU | |
| 2 | 44 | New Orleans Saints | Vince Buck | CB | Central State | |
| 2 | 45 | Cleveland Browns | Leroy Hoard ^{†} | RB | Michigan | |
| 2 | 46 | Washington Redskins | Andre Collins | LB | Penn State | |
| 2 | 47 | San Francisco 49ers | Dennis Brown | DE | Washington | from Minnesota via Dallas (Note: No. 47: Minnesota → Dallas → San Francisco. Multiple trades: Minnesota → Dallas (PD). See Round 1: Minnesota → Dallas. Dallas → San Francisco (PD). Dallas traded second- and third-round selections (47th and 68th overall) to San Francisco in exchange for third- and eleventh-round selections (81st and 304th overall), RB Terrence Flagler and DE Danny Stubbs.) |
| 2 | 48 | Green Bay Packers | LeRoy Butler^{‡}^{†} | S | Florida State | |
| 2 | 49 | Los Angeles Rams | Pat Terrell | S | Notre Dame | |
| 2 | 50 | Philadelphia Eagles | Mike Bellamy | WR | Illinois | |
| 2 | 51 | New York Giants | Mike Fox | DE | West Virginia | |
| 2 | 52 | Denver Broncos | Alton Montgomery | S | Houston | |
| 2 | 53 | San Francisco 49ers | Eric Davis ^{†} | CB | Jacksonville State | |
| 3 | 54 | Minnesota Vikings | Mike Jones | TE | Texas A&M | from Dallas (Note: No. 54: Dallas → Minnesota (PD). See Round 1: Minnesota → Dallas.) |
| 3 | 55 | Atlanta Falcons | Oliver Barnett | DE | Kentucky | |
| 3 | 56 | New York Jets | Tony Stargell | CB | Tennessee State | |
| 3 | 57 | San Diego Chargers | Jeff Mills | LB | Nebraska | from Tampa Bay (Note: No. 57: Tampa Bay → San Diego (PD). Tampa Bay traded a third-round selection (57th overall) and a 1991 second-round selection to San Diego in exchange for RB Gary Anderson.) |
| 3 | 58 | Phoenix Cardinals | Ricky Proehl | WR | Wake Forest | |
| 3 | 59 | New England Patriots | Tommy Hodson | QB | LSU | |
| 3 | 60 | San Diego Chargers | Leo Goeas | G | Hawaii | |
| 3 | 61 | Chicago Bears | Tim Ryan | DT | USC | |
| 3 | 62 | Detroit Lions | Marc Spindler | DE | Pittsburgh | |
| 3 | 63 | Chicago Bears | Peter Tom Willis | QB | Florida State | from LA Raiders (Note: No. 63: LA Raiders → Chicago (PD). The LA Raiders traded a third-round selection (63rd overall) and a 1989 first-round selection to Chicago in exchange for WR Willie Gault.) |
| 3 | 64 | Dallas Cowboys | Jimmie Jones | DT | Miami (FL) | from Seattle via New England (Note: No. 64: Seattle → New England → Dallas. Multiple trades: Seattle → New England (D). See Round 1: New England → Seattle. New England → Dallas (D). New England traded third-, sixth- and eighth-round selections (64th, 143rd and 197th overall) to Dallas in exchange for third-, fifth- and seventh-round selections (80th, 120th and 166th overall).) |
| 3 | 65 | Cincinnati Bengals | Bernard Clark | LB | Miami (FL) | |
| 3 | 66 | Miami Dolphins | Alfred Oglesby | DT | Houston | |
| 3 | 67 | San Diego Chargers | Walter Wilson | WR | East Carolina | from Indianapolis (Note: No. 67: Indianapolis → San Diego (PD). Indianapolis traded a third-round selection (67th overall) to San Diego in exchange for LB Chip Banks.) |
| 3 | 68 | San Francisco 49ers | Ron Lewis | WR | Florida State | from Kansas City via Dallas (Note: No. 68: Kansas City → Dallas → San Francisco. Multiple trades: Kansas City → Dallas (PD). Kansas City traded a third-round selection (68th overall) and a conditional 1991 fourth-round selection to Dallas in exchange for QB Steve Pelluer. Dallas → San Francisco (PD). See Round 2: Dallas → San Francisco.) |
| 3 | 69 | Buffalo Bills | Glenn Parker | G | Arizona | |
| 3 | 70 | Pittsburgh Steelers | Neil O'Donnell ^{†} | QB | Maryland | |
| 3 | 71 | New Orleans Saints | Joel Smeenge | DE | Western Michigan | |
| 3 | 72 | Houston Oilers | Willis Peguese | DE | Miami (FL) | |
| 3 | 73 | Cleveland Browns | Anthony Pleasant | DE | Tennessee State | |
| 3 | 74 | Minnesota Vikings | Marion Hobby | DE | Tennessee | |
| 3 | 75 | Green Bay Packers | Bobby Houston | LB | NC State | |
| 3 | 76 | Washington Redskins | Mohammed Elewonibi | T | BYU | |
| 3 | 77 | Philadelphia Eagles | Fred Barnett ^{†} | WR | Arkansas State | |
| 3 | 78 | Los Angeles Rams | Latin Berry | CB | Oregon | |
| 3 | 79 | New York Giants | Greg Mark | LB | Miami (FL) | |
| 3 | 80 | New England Patriots | Greg McMurtry | WR | Michigan | from Denver via Dallas (Note: No. 80: Denver → Dallas → New England. Multiple trades: Denver → Dallas (PD). Denver traded a third-round selection (80th overall) to Dallas in exchange for a fourth-round selection (82nd overall) and DT Kevin Brooks. Dallas → New England (D). See Round 3: New England → Dallas.) |
| 3 | 81 | Pittsburgh Steelers | Craig Veasey | DT | Houston | from San Francisco via Dallas (Note: No. 81: San Francisco → Dallas → Pittsburgh. Multiple trades: San Francisco → Dallas (D). See Round 3: Dallas → San Francisco. Dallas → Pittsburgh (D). See Round 1: Pittsburgh → Dallas.) |
| 4 | 82 | Denver Broncos | Jeroy Robinson | LB | Texas A&M | from Dallas (Note: No. 82: Dallas → Denver (PD). See Round 3: Denver → Dallas.) |
| 4 | 83 | Indianapolis Colts | Stacey Simmons | WR | Florida | from Atlanta (Note: No. 83: Atlanta → Indianapolis (D). See Round 1: Atlanta → Indianapolis.) |
| 4 | 84 | New York Jets | Troy Taylor | QB | California | |
| 4 | 85 | Phoenix Cardinals | Travis Davis | DT | Michigan State | |
| 4 | 86 | Washington Redskins | Cary Conklin | QB | Washington | from New England (Note: No. 86: New England → Washington (D). New England traded a fourth-round selection (86th overall) to Washington in exchange for two fifth-round selections (110th and 111th overall).) |
| 4 | 87 | Tampa Bay Buccaneers | Jess Anderson | TE | Mississippi State | |
| 4 | 88 | Chicago Bears | Tony Moss | WR | LSU | |
| 4 | 89 | Seattle Seahawks | Chris Warren ^{†} | RB | Ferrum | |
| 4 | 90 | Detroit Lions | Rob Hinckley | LB | Stanford | |
| 4 | 91 | Cincinnati Bengals | Mike Brennan | G | Notre Dame | |
| 4 | 92 | San Francisco 49ers | Dean Caliguire | C | Pittsburgh | from San Diego via LA Raiders (Note: No. 92: Multiple trades: San Diego → LA Raiders (PD). San Diego traded a fourth-round selection (92nd overall), and 1989 third- and fourth-round selections to the LA Raiders in exchange for RB Napoleon McCallum. LA Raiders → San Francisco (D). The LA Raiders traded a fourth-round selection (92nd overall) to San Francisco in exchange for fourth- and fifth-round selections (109th and 137th overall).) |
| 4 | 93 | Miami Dolphins | Scott Mitchell | QB | Utah | |
| 4 | 94 | Indianapolis Colts | Bill Schultz | G | USC | |
| 4 | 95 | Los Angeles Raiders | Torin Dorn | CB | North Carolina | |
| 4 | 96 | Kansas City Chiefs | Fred Jones | WR | Grambling State | |
| 4 | 97 | Pittsburgh Steelers | Chris Calloway | WR | Michigan | |
| 4 | 98 | New Orleans Saints | DeMond Winston | LB | Vanderbilt | |
| 4 | 99 | Houston Oilers | Eric Still | G | Tennessee | |
| 4 | 100 | Buffalo Bills | Eddie Fuller | RB | LSU | |
| 4 | 101 | Cleveland Browns | Harlon Barnett | S | Michigan State | |
| 4 | 102 | Green Bay Packers | Jackie Harris ^{†} | TE | Northeast Louisiana | |
| 4 | 103 | Indianapolis Colts | Alan Grant | CB | Stanford | from Washington (Note: No. 103: Washington → Indianapolis (PD). Washington traded fourth- and eighth-round selections (103rd and 213th overall) to Indianapolis in exchange for a 1989 fifth-round selection.) |
| 4 | 104 | Minnesota Vikings | Alonzo Hampton | CB | Pittsburgh | |
| 4 | 105 | Detroit Lions | Chris Oldham | S | Oregon | from LA Rams (Note: No. 105: LA Rams → Detroit (PD). The LA Rams traded a fourth-round selection (105th overall) to Detroit in exchange for TE Pat Carter.) |
| 4 | 106 | Indianapolis Colts | Rick Cunningham | G | Texas A&M | from Philadelphia (Note: No. 106: Philadelphia → Indianapolis (PD). Philadelphia traded a fourth-round selection (106th overall) and a 1989 first-round selection to Indianapolis in exchange for G Ron Solt.) |
| 4 | 107 | New York Giants | David Whitmore | S | Stephen F. Austin | |
| 4 | 108 | Tampa Bay Buccaneers | Tony Mayberry ^{†} | C | Wake Forest | from Denver (Note: No. 108: Denver → Tampa Bay (PD). Denver traded a fourth-round selection (108th overall) to Tampa Bay in exchange for DE Ron Holmes.) |
| 4 | 109 | Washington Redskins | Rico Labbe | CB | Boston College | from San Francisco via LA Raiders (Note: No. 109: San Francisco → LA Raiders → Washington. Multiple trades: San Francisco → LA Raiders (D). See Round 4: LA Raiders → San Francisco. LA Raiders → Washington (D). Unknown terms.) |
| 5 | 110 | New England Patriots | Junior Robinson | CB | East Carolina | from Dallas via Washington (Note: No. 110: Dallas → Washington → New England. Multiple trades: Dallas → Washington (PD). Dallas traded a fifth-round selection (110th overall) to Washington in exchange for DT Dean Hamel. Washington → New England (D). See Round 4: New England → Washington.) |
| 5 | 111 | Denver Broncos | Jeff Davidson | G | Ohio State | from Atlanta via Washington and New England (Note: No. 111: Atlanta → Washington → New England → Denver. Multiple trades: Atlanta → Washington (PD). See Round 1: Washington → Atlanta. Washington → New England (D). See Round 4: New England → Washington. New England → Denver (D). New England traded a fifth-round selection (111th overall) to Denver in exchange for a 1991 fourth-round selection.) |
| 5 | 112 | New York Jets | Tony Savage | DT | Washington State | |
| 5 | 113 | New England Patriots | Jon Melander | G | Minnesota | |
| 5 | 114 | Tampa Bay Buccaneers | Ian Beckles | G | Indiana | |
| 5 | 115 | Phoenix Cardinals | Larry Centers ^{†} | FB | Stephen F. Austin | |
| 5 | 116 | Minnesota Vikings | Reggie Thornton | WR | Bowling Green | from San Diego via Dallas (Note: No. 116: San Diego → Dallas → Minnesota. Multiple trades: San Diego → Dallas (PD). San Diego traded a fifth-round selection (116th overall) to Dallas in exchange for RB Darrin Nelson. Dallas → Minnesota (PD). See Round 1: Minnesota → Dallas.) |
| 5 | 117 | Chicago Bears | Pat Chaffey | RB | Oregon State | |
| 5 | 118 | Detroit Lions | Jeff Campbell | WR | Colorado | |
| 5 | 119 | Seattle Seahawks | Eric Hayes | DT | Florida State | |
| 5 | 120 | New England Patriots | James Gary | RB | Texas Tech | from Miami via Dallas (Note: No. 120: Miami → Dallas → New England. Multiple trades: Miami → Dallas (PD). Miami traded a fifth-round selection (120th overall) to Dallas in exchange for QB Scott Secules. Dallas → New England (PD). See Round 3: New England → Dallas.) |
| 5 | 121 | Atlanta Falcons | Reggie Redding | T | Cal State Fullerton | from Indianapolis (Note: No. 121: Indianapolis → Atlanta (D). See Round 1: Atlanta → Indianapolis.) |
| 5 | 122 | Cincinnati Bengals | Lynn James | WR | Arizona State | |
| 5 | 123 | Los Angeles Raiders | Stan Smagala | DB | Notre Dame | |
| 5 | 124 | Kansas City Chiefs | Derrick Graham | T | Appalachian State | |
| 5 | 125 | New Orleans Saints | Charles Arbuckle | TE | UCLA | |
| 5 | 126 | Houston Oilers | Richard Newbill | LB | Miami (FL) | |
| 5 | 127 | Kansas City Chiefs | Ken Hackemack | T | Texas | from Buffalo (Note: No. 127: Buffalo → Kansas City (PD). Buffalo traded a fifth-round selection (127th overall) and a 1989 eighth-round selection to Kansas City in exchange for an eighth-round selection (208th overall) and DE Art Still.) |
| 5 | 128 | Pittsburgh Steelers | Barry Foster ^{†} | RB | Arkansas | |
| 5 | 129 | Cleveland Browns | Rob Burnett ^{†} | DE | Syracuse | |
| 5 | 130 | Washington Redskins | Brian Mitchell ^{†} | RB | Northeast Louisiana | |
| 5 | 131 | Minnesota Vikings | Cedric Smith | RB | Florida | |
| 5 | 132 | Green Bay Packers | Charles Wilson | WR | Memphis | |
| 5 | 133 | Philadelphia Eagles | Calvin Williams | WR | Purdue | |
| 5 | 134 | New York Jets | Robert McWright | DB | TCU | from LA Rams (Note: No. 134: LA Rams → NY Jets (D). The LA Rams traded a fifth-round selection (134th overall) to the NY Jets in exchange for CB Bobby Humphery.) |
| 5 | 135 | New York Giants | Craig Kupp | QB | Pacific Lutheran | |
| 5 | 136 | Denver Broncos | Le-Lo Lang | CB | Washington | |
| 5 | 137 | Miami Dolphins | Leroy Holt | FB | USC | from San Francisco via LA Raiders and Washington (Note: No. 137: San Francisco → LA Raiders → Washington → Miami. Multiple trades: San Francisco → LA Raiders (D). See Round 4: LA Raiders → San Francisco. LA Raiders → Washington (D). Unknown terms. Washington → Miami Washington traded a fifth-round selection (137th overall) to Miami in exchange for a tenth-round selection (262nd overall) and a 1991 fourth-round selection.) |
| 6 | 138 | San Diego Chargers | John Friesz | QB | Idaho | from Dallas (Note: No. 138: Dallas → San Diego (D). Dallas traded three sixth-round selections (138th, 143rd and 163rd overall) to San Diego in exchange for a 1991 third-round selection.) |
| 6 | 139 | Atlanta Falcons | Mike Pringle | RB | Cal State Fullerton | |
| 6 | 140 | New York Jets | Terance Mathis ^{†} | WR | New Mexico | |
| 6 | 141 | Tampa Bay Buccaneers | Derrick Douglas | RB | Louisiana Tech | |
| 6 | 142 | Phoenix Cardinals | Tyrone Shavers | WR | Lamar | |
| 6 | 143 | San Diego Chargers | Frank Cornish | C | UCLA | from New England via Dallas (Note: No. 143: New England → Dallas → San Diego. Multiple trades: New England → Dallas (D). See Round 3: Dallas → San Diego. Dallas → San Diego (D). See Round 6: New England → Dallas.) |
| 6 | 144 | Chicago Bears | John Mangum | CB | Alabama | |
| 6 | 145 | San Diego Chargers | David Pool | CB | Carson–Newman | |
| 6 | 146 | Seattle Seahawks | Ned Bolcar | LB | Notre Dame | |
| 6 | 147 | Detroit Lions | Maurice Henry | LB | Kansas State | |
| 6 | 148 | Indianapolis Colts | Tony Walker | LB | Southeast Missouri State | |
| 6 | 149 | Los Angeles Raiders | Marcus Wilson | RB | Virginia | |
| 6 | 150 | Cincinnati Bengals | Don Odegard | CB | UNLV | |
| 6 | 151 | Miami Dolphins | Sean Vanhorse | CB | Howard | |
| 6 | 152 | Kansas City Chiefs | Tom Sims | DT | Pittsburgh | |
| 6 | 153 | Houston Oilers | Tony Jones | WR | Texas | |
| 6 | 154 | Buffalo Bills | John Nies | P | Arizona | |
| 6 | 155 | Pittsburgh Steelers | Ronald Heard | WR | Bowling Green | |
| 6 | 156 | New Orleans Saints | Mike Buck | QB | Maine | |
| 6 | 157 | Cleveland Browns | Randy Hilliard | CB | Northwestern State | |
| 6 | 158 | New Orleans Saints | James Williams | LB | Mississippi State | from Minnesota via Dallas and LA Raiders (Note: No. 158: Minnesota → Dallas → LA Raiders → New Orleans. Multiple trades: Minnesota → Dallas (D). See Round 1: Minnesota → Dallas. Dallas → LA Raiders (D). Dallas traded sixth-, eighth-, ninth-, tenth- and eleventh-round selections (158th, 197th, 230rd, 259th and 304th overall) to the LA Raiders in exchange for the rights to S Stan Smagala, whom the Raiders had drafted in the fifth round. LA Raiders → New Orleans (D) The LA Raiders traded sixth-, eighth-, ninth-, tenth- and eleventh-round selections (158th, 207th, 233rd, 260th and 287th overall) to New Orleans in exchange for a 1991 fourth-round selection.) |
| 6 | 159 | Green Bay Packers | Bryce Paup ^{†} | LB | Northern Iowa | |
| 6 | 160 | Washington Redskins | Kent Wells | DT | Nebraska | |
| 6 | 161 | Los Angeles Rams | Tim Stallworth | WR | Washington State | |
| 6 | 162 | Philadelphia Eagles | Kevin Thompson | DB | Oklahoma | |
| 6 | 163 | San Diego Chargers | Derrick Walker | TE | Michigan | from NY Giants via Dallas (Note: No. 163: NY Giants → Dallas → San Diego. Multiple trades: NY Giants → Dallas (PD). The NY Giants traded a sixth-round selection (163rd overall) to Dallas in exchange for LB Steve DeOssie. Dallas → San Diego (D). See Round 6: Dallas → San Diego.) |
| 6 | 164 | Denver Broncos | Ronnie Haliburton | LB | LSU | |
| 6 | 165 | San Francisco 49ers | Frank Pollack | T | Northern Arizona | |
| 7 | 166 | Buffalo Bills | Brent Griffith | G | Minnesota Duluth | from Dallas via New England (Note: No. 166: Dallas → New England → Buffalo. Multiple trades: Dallas → New England (D). See Round 3: New England → Dallas. New England → Buffalo (D). New England traded two seventh-round selections (166th and 170th overall) to Buffalo in exchange for the Bills' twelfth-round selection (322nd overall) and a 1991 fourth-round selection.) |
| 7 | 167 | New York Jets | Dwayne White | G | Alcorn State | from Atlanta (Note: No. 167: Atlanta → NY Jets (PD). Atlanta traded a seventh-round selection (167th overall) to the NY Jets in exchange for C Guy Bingham.) |
| 7 | 168 | New York Jets | Basil Proctor | LB | West Virginia | |
| 7 | 169 | Phoenix Cardinals | Johnny Johnson ^{†} | RB | San Jose State | |
| 7 | 170 | Buffalo Bills | Brent Collins | LB | Carson–Newman | from New England (Note: No. 170: New England → Buffalo (D). See Round 7: New England → Buffalo.) |
| 7 | 171 | Tampa Bay Buccaneers | Donnie Gardner | DE | Kentucky | |
| 7 | 172 | San Diego Chargers | Jeff Novak | G | Southwest Texas State | |
| 7 | 173 | Los Angeles Raiders | Garry Lewis | CB | Alcorn State | from Chicago (Note: No. 173: Chicago → LA Raiders (D). Chicago traded a seventh-round selection (173rd overall) to the LA Raiders in exchange for seventh- and eleventh-round selections (176th and 298th overall).) |
| 7 | 174 | Detroit Lions | Tracy Hayworth | LB | Tennessee | |
| 7 | 175 | Seattle Seahawks | Bob Kula | T | Michigan State | |
| 7 | 176 | Chicago Bears | Bill Anderson | C | Iowa | from LA Raiders (Note: No. 176: LA Raiders → Chicago (D). See Round 7: Chicago → LA Raiders.) |
| 7 | 177 | Cincinnati Bengals | Craig Ogletree | LB | Auburn | |
| 7 | 178 | Cleveland Browns | Scott Galbraith | TE | USC | from Miami (Note: No. 178: Miami → Cleveland (D). Miami traded a seventh-round selection (178th overall) to Cleveland in exchange for a 1991 fifth-round selection.) |
| 7 | 179 | Indianapolis Colts | James Singletary | LB | East Carolina | |
| 7 | 180 | Kansas City Chiefs | Dave Szott ^{†} | G | Penn State | |
| 7 | 181 | Buffalo Bills | Fred DeRiggi | DT | Syracuse | |
| 7 | 182 | Pittsburgh Steelers | Dan Grayson | LB | Washington State | |
| 7 | 183 | New Orleans Saints | Scott Hough | G | Maine | |
| 7 | 184 | Houston Oilers | Andy Murray | RB | Kentucky | |
| 7 | 185 | San Diego Chargers | Joe Staysniak | G | Ohio State | from Cleveland (Note: No. 185: Cleveland → San Diego (PD). Cleveland traded a seventh-round selection (185th overall) to San Diego in exchange for RB Barry Redden.) |
| 7 | 186 | Green Bay Packers | Lester Archambeau | DE | Stanford | |
| 7 | 187 | San Diego Chargers | Nate Lewis | WR | Oregon Tech | from Washington (Note: No. 187: Washington → San Diego (PD). Washington traded a seventh-round selection (187th overall) to San Diego in exchange for P Ralf Mojsiejenko.) |
| 7 | 188 | Minnesota Vikings | John Levelis | LB | C.W. Post | |
| 7 | 189 | Philadelphia Eagles | Terry Strouf | T | Wisconsin–La Crosse | |
| 7 | 190 | Los Angeles Rams | Kent Elmore | P | Tennessee | |
| 7 | 191 | New York Giants | Aaron Emanuel | RB | USC | |
| 7 | 192 | Denver Broncos | Shannon Sharpe^{‡}^{†} | TE | Savannah State | |
| 7 | 193 | San Diego Chargers | Keith Collins | DB | Appalachian State | from San Francisco (Note: No. 193: San Francisco → San Diego (PD). San Francisco traded a seventh-round selection (193rd overall) and a 1989 seventh-round selection to San Diego in exchange for WR Wes Chandler.) |
| 8 | 194 | Detroit Lions | Willie Green | WR | Mississippi | from Dallas (Note: No. 194: Dallas → Detroit (PD). Dallas traded an eighth-round selection (194th overall) to Detroit in exchange for RB Paul Palmer.) |
| 8 | 195 | Atlanta Falcons | Tory Epps | DT | Memphis State | |
| 8 | 196 | New York Jets | Roger Duffy | C | Penn State | |
| 8 | 197 | Los Angeles Raiders | Arthur Jimerson | DE | Norfolk State | from New England via Dallas (Note: No. 197: New England → Dallas → LA Raiders: Multiple trades: New England → Dallas (D). See Round 3: New England → Dallas. Dallas → LA Raiders (D). See Round 6: Dallas → LA Raiders.) |
| 8 | 198 | Los Angeles Rams | Ray Savage | LB | Virginia | from Tampa Bay (Note: No. 198: Tampa Bay → LA Rams (?). Tampa Bay traded an eighth-round selection (198th overall) to the LA Rams in exchange for two 1989 eleventh-round selections and a 1989 twelfth-round selection.) |
| 8 | 199 | Phoenix Cardinals | Mickey Washington | CB | Texas A&M | |
| 8 | 200 | Chicago Bears | James Rouse | RB | Arkansas | |
| 8 | 201 | San Diego Chargers | J. J. Flannigan | RB | Colorado | |
| 8 | 202 | Seattle Seahawks | Bill Hitchcock | G | Purdue | |
| 8 | 203 | Detroit Lions | Roman Fortin | C | San Diego State | |
| 8 | 204 | Cincinnati Bengals | Doug Wellsandt | TE | Washington State | |
| 8 | 205 | Miami Dolphins | Thomas Woods | WR | Tennessee | |
| 8 | 206 | Indianapolis Colts | Ken Clark | RB | Nebraska | |
| 8 | 207 | New Orleans Saints | Gerry Gdowski | QB | Nebraska | from LA Raiders (Note: No. 207: LA Raiders → New Orleans (D). See Round 6: LA Raiders → New Orleans.) |
| 8 | 208 | Buffalo Bills | Marvcus Patton | LB | UCLA | from Kansas City (Note: No. 208: Kansas City → Buffalo (PD). See Round 5: Buffalo → Kansas City.) |
| 8 | 209 | Pittsburgh Steelers | Karl Dunbar | DE | Louisiana State | |
| 8 | 210 | New Orleans Saints | Derrick Carr | DE | Bowling Green | |
| 8 | 211 | Houston Oilers | Brett Tucker | DB | NIU | |
| 8 | – | Buffalo Bills | Selection forfeited during the 1989 supplemental draft. (Note: Buffalo forfeited an eighth-round selection after selecting DB Brett Young in the 1989 supplemental draft.) | | | |
| 8 | 212 | Cleveland Browns | Jock Jones | LB | Virginia Tech | |
| 8 | 213 | Indianapolis Colts | Harvey Wilson | DB | Southern U. | from Washington (Note: No. 213: Washington → Indianapolis (PD). See Round 4: Washington → Indianapolis.) |
| 8 | 214 | Minnesota Vikings | Craig Schlichting | DE | Wyoming | |
| 8 | 215 | Green Bay Packers | Roger Brown | CB | Virginia Tech | |
| 8 | 216 | Los Angeles Rams | Elbert Crawford | G | Arkansas | |
| 8 | 217 | Philadelphia Eagles | Curt Dykes | T | Oregon | |
| 8 | 218 | New York Giants | Barry Voorhees | T | Cal State Northridge | |
| 8 | 219 | Denver Broncos | Brad Leggett | C | USC | |
| 8 | 220 | San Francisco 49ers | Dwight Pickens | WR | Fresno State | |
| 9 | 221 | Dallas Cowboys | Kenneth Gant | DB | Albany State | |
| 9 | 222 | Atlanta Falcons | Darrell Jordan | LB | Northern Arizona | |
| 9 | 223 | New York Jets | Dale Dawkins | WR | Miami (FL) | |
| 9 | 224 | Tampa Bay Buccaneers | Terry Cook | DE | Fresno State | |
| 9 | 225 | Phoenix Cardinals | David Bavaro | LB | Syracuse | |
| 9 | 226 | New England Patriots | Shawn Bouwens | G | Nebraska Wesleyan | |
| 9 | 227 | San Diego Chargers | Chris Goetz | G | Pittsburgh | |
| 9 | 228 | Chicago Bears | Johnny Bailey ^{†} | RB | Texas A&M–Kingsville | |
| 9 | 229 | Detroit Lions | Jack Linn | T | West Virginia | |
| 9 | 230 | Los Angeles Raiders | Leon Perry | RB | Oklahoma | from Seattle via Dallas (Note: No. 230: Seattle → Dallas → LA Raiders. Multiple trades: Seattle → Dallas (PD). Seattle traded a ninth-round selection (230th overall) to Dallas in exchange for OT Daryle Smith. Dallas → LA Raiders (D). See Round 6: Dallas → LA Raiders.) |
| 9 | 231 | Miami Dolphins | Phil Ross | TE | Oregon State | |
| 9 | 232 | Indianapolis Colts | Darvell Huffman | WR | Boston University | |
| 9 | 233 | New Orleans Saints | Broderick Graves | RB | Winston-Salem | from LA Raiders (Note: No. 233: LA Raiders → New Orleans (D). See Round 6: LA Raiders → New Orleans.) |
| 9 | 234 | Cincinnati Bengals | Mitchell Price | CB | Tulane | |
| 9 | 235 | Kansas City Chiefs | Michael Owens | RB | Syracuse | |
| 9 | 236 | New Orleans Saints | Lonnie Brockman | LB | West Virginia | |
| 9 | 237 | Houston Oilers | Pat Coleman | WR | Ole Miss | |
| 9 | 238 | Buffalo Bills | Clarkston Hines | WR | Duke | |
| 9 | 239 | Pittsburgh Steelers | Gary Jones | S | Texas A&M | |
| 9 | 240 | Cleveland Browns | Eugene Rowell | WR | Southern Miss | |
| 9 | 241 | Minnesota Vikings | Terry Allen ^{†} | RB | Clemson | |
| 9 | 242 | Green Bay Packers | Kirk Baumgartner | QB | Wisconsin–Stevens Point | |
| 9 | 243 | Washington Redskins | Tim Moxley | G | Ohio State | |
| 9 | 244 | Philadelphia Eagles | Cecil Gray | T | North Carolina | |
| 9 | 245 | Los Angeles Rams | Tony Lomack | WR | Florida | |
| 9 | 246 | New York Giants | Clint James | DE | LSU | |
| 9 | 247 | Denver Broncos | Todd Ellis | QB | South Carolina | |
| 9 | 248 | San Francisco 49ers | Odell Haggins | DT | Florida State | |
| 10 | 249 | Minnesota Vikings | Pat Newman | WR | Utah State | from Dallas (Note: No. 249: Dallas → Minnesota (PD). See Round 1: Minnesota → Dallas.) |
| 10 | 250 | Atlanta Falcons | Donnie Salum | LB | Arizona | |
| 10 | 251 | New York Jets | Brad Quast | LB | Iowa | |
| 10 | 252 | Phoenix Cardinals | Dave Elle | TE | South Dakota | |
| 10 | 253 | New England Patriots | Anthony Landry | RB | Stephen F. Austin | |
| 10 | 254 | Tampa Bay Buccaneers | Mike Busch | TE | Iowa State | |
| 10 | 255 | Chicago Bears | Terry Price | DE | Texas A&M | |
| 10 | 256 | San Diego Chargers | Kenny Berry | DB | Miami (FL) | |
| 10 | 257 | Seattle Seahawks | Robert Morris | DE | Valdosta State | |
| 10 | 258 | Detroit Lions | Bill Miller | WR | Illinois State | |
| 10 | 259 | Denver Broncos | Jim Szymanski | DE | Michigan State | from Indianapolis via Dallas and LA Raiders (Note: No. 259: Indianapolis → Dallas → LA Raiders → Denver. Multiple trades: Indianapolis → Dallas (PD). Indianapolis traded a tenth-round selection (259th overall) to the LA Raiders in exchange for OT Zefross Moss. Dallas → LA Raiders (D). See Round 6: Dallas → LA Raiders. LA Raiders → Denver (D). The LA Raiders traded a tenth-round selection (259th overall) to Denver in exchange for an eleventh-round selection (303rd overall) and past considerations.) |
| 10 | 260 | New Orleans Saints | Gary Cooper | WR | Clemson | from LA Raiders (Note: No. 260: LA Raiders → New Orleans (D). See Round 6: LA Raiders → New Orleans.) |
| 10 | 261 | Cincinnati Bengals | Eric Crigler | T | Murray State | |
| 10 | 262 | Washington Redskins | D'Juan Francisco | DB | Notre Dame | from Miami (Note: No. 262: Miami → Washington (D). See Round 5: Washington → Miami.) |
| 10 | 263 | Kansas City Chiefs | Craig Hudson | TE | Wisconsin | |
| 10 | 264 | Houston Oilers | Dee Thomas | DB | Nicholls State | |
| 10 | 265 | Buffalo Bills | Mike Lodish | DT | UCLA | |
| 10 | 266 | Pittsburgh Steelers | Eddie Miles | LB | Minnesota | |
| 10 | 267 | New Orleans Saints | Ernest Spears | DB | USC | |
| 10 | 268 | Cleveland Browns | Michael Wallace | DB | Jackson State | |
| 10 | 269 | Green Bay Packers | Jerome Martin | DB | Western Kentucky | |
| 10 | 270 | Washington Redskins | Thomas Rayam | G | Alabama | |
| 10 | 271 | Minnesota Vikings | Donald Smith | DB | Liberty | |
| 10 | 272 | Los Angeles Rams | Steve Bates | DE | James Madison | |
| 10 | 273 | Philadelphia Eagles | Orlando Adams | DT | Jacksonville State | |
| 10 | 274 | New York Giants | Otis Moore | DT | Clemson | |
| 10 | 275 | Denver Broncos | Anthony Thompson | LB | East Carolina | |
| 10 | 276 | San Francisco 49ers | Martin Harrison | DE | Washington | |
| 11 | 277 | Dallas Cowboys | Dave Harper | LB | Humboldt State | |
| 11 | 278 | Atlanta Falcons | Chris Ellison | DB | Houston | |
| 11 | 279 | New York Jets | Derrick Kelson | DB | Purdue | |
| 11 | 280 | New England Patriots | Sean Smith | DE | Georgia Tech | |
| 11 | 281 | Tampa Bay Buccaneers | Terry Anthony | WR | Florida State | |
| 11 | 282 | Phoenix Cardinals | Dempsey Norman | WR | St. Francis (IL) | |
| 11 | 283 | San Diego Chargers | Tommie Stowers | TE | Missouri | |
| 11 | 284 | Chicago Bears | Brent White | DE | Michigan | |
| 11 | 285 | Detroit Lions | Reginald Warnsley | RB | Southern Miss | |
| 11 | 286 | Seattle Seahawks | Daryl Reed | DB | Oregon | |
| 11 | 287 | New Orleans Saints | Webbie Burnett | DT | Western Kentucky | from LA Raiders (Note: No. 287: LA Raiders → New Orleans (D). See Round 6: LA Raiders → New Orleans.) |
| 11 | 288 | Cincinnati Bengals | Tim O'Connor | T | Virginia | |
| 11 | 289 | San Francisco 49ers | Anthony Shelton | S | Tennessee State | from Miami (Note: No. 289: Miami → San Francisco (D). Miami traded an eleventh-round selection (289th overall) and a 1991 second-round selection to San Francisco in exchange for CB Tim McKyer.) |
| 11 | 290 | Indianapolis Colts | Carnel Smith | DE | Pittsburgh | |
| 11 | 291 | Kansas City Chiefs | Ernest Thompson | RB | Georgia Southern | |
| 11 | 292 | Buffalo Bills | Al Edwards | WR | Northwestern State | |
| 11 | 293 | Pittsburgh Steelers | Justin Strzelczyk | G | Maine | |
| 11 | 294 | Philadelphia Eagles | John Hudson | G | Auburn | from New Orleans (Note: No. 294: New Orleans → Philadelphia (PD). New Orleans traded an eleventh-round selection (294th overall) to Philadelphia in exchange for RB Bobby Morse.) |
| 11 | 295 | Houston Oilers | Joey Banes | T | Houston | |
| 11 | 296 | Cleveland Browns | Clemente Gordon | QB | Grambling State | |
| 11 | 297 | Washington Redskins | Jon Leverenz | LB | Minnesota | |
| 11 | 298 | Chicago Bears | Roman Matusz | T | Pittsburgh | from Minnesota via LA Raiders (Note: No. 298: Minnesota → LA Raiders → Chicago. Multiple trades: Minnesota → LA Raiders (PD). Minnesota traded an eleventh-round selection (298th overall) to the LA Raiders in exchange for a 1989 twelfth-round selection. LA Raiders → Chicago (D). See Round 7: Chicago → LA Raiders.) |
| 11 | 299 | Green Bay Packers | Harry Jackson | RB | St. Cloud State | |
| 11 | 300 | Philadelphia Eagles | Tyrone Watson | WR | Tennessee State | |
| 11 | 301 | Los Angeles Rams | Bill Goldberg | DE | Georgia | |
| 11 | 302 | New York Giants | Tim Downing | DE | Washington State | |
| 11 | 303 | Los Angeles Raiders | Ron Lewis | WR | Jackson State | from Denver (Note: No. 303: Denver → LA Raiders (D). See Round 10: LA Raiders → Denver.) |
| 11 | 304 | Los Angeles Raiders | Myron Jones | RB | Fresno State | from San Francisco via Dallas (Note: No. 304: San Francisco → Dallas → LA Raiders. Multiple trades: San Francisco → Dallas (PD). See Round 2: Dallas → San Francisco. Dallas → LA Raiders (D). See Round 6: Dallas → LA Raiders.) |
| 12 | – | Dallas Cowboys | Selection forfeited during the 1989 supplemental draft. (Note: Dallas forfeited a twelfth-round selection after selecting RB Mike Lowman in the 1989 supplemental draft.) | | | |
| 12 | 305 | Atlanta Falcons | Shawn McCarthy | P | Purdue | |
| 12 | 306 | New York Jets | Darrell Davis | DE | TCU | |
| 12 | 307 | Tampa Bay Buccaneers | Todd Hammel | QB | Stephen F. Austin | |
| 12 | 308 | Phoenix Cardinals | Donnie Riley | RB | Central Michigan | |
| 12 | 309 | New England Patriots | Ventson Donelson | DB | Michigan State | |
| 12 | 310 | Chicago Bears | Anthony Cooney | DB | Arkansas | |
| 12 | 311 | Indianapolis Colts | Gene Benhart | QB | Western Illinois | from San Diego (Note: No. 311: San Diego → Indianapolis (PD). San Diego traded a twelfth-round selection (311th overall) to Indianapolis in exchange for CB Leonard Coleman.) |
| 12 | 312 | Seattle Seahawks | John Gromos | QB | Vanderbilt | |
| 12 | 313 | Detroit Lions | Robert Claiborne | WR | San Diego State | |
| 12 | 314 | Cincinnati Bengals | Andre Riley | WR | Washington | |
| 12 | 315 | Miami Dolphins | Bobby Harden | S | Miami (FL) | |
| 12 | 316 | Indianapolis Colts | Dean Brown | G | Notre Dame | |
| 12 | 317 | Los Angeles Raiders | Major Harris | QB | West Virginia | |
| 12 | 318 | Kansas City Chiefs | Tony Jeffery | WR | San Jose State | |
| 12 | 319 | Pittsburgh Steelers | Richard Bell | RB | Nebraska | |
| 12 | 320 | New Orleans Saints | Chris Port | G | Duke | |
| 12 | 321 | Houston Oilers | Reggie Slack | QB | Auburn | |
| 12 | 322 | New England Patriots | Blaine Rose | G | Maryland | from Buffalo (Note: No. 322: Buffalo → New England (D). New England → Buffalo.) |
| 12 | 323 | Cleveland Browns | Kerry Simien | WR | Texas A&M–Kingsville | |
| 12 | 324 | Minnesota Vikings | Ron Goetz | LB | Minnesota | |
| 12 | 325 | Green Bay Packers | Kirk Maggio | P | UCLA | |
| 12 | 326 | San Diego Chargers | Elliott Searcy | WR | Southern | from Washington (Note: No. 326: Washington → San Diego (PD). Washington traded a twelfth-round selection (326th overall) to San Diego in exchange for a 1989 twelfth-round selection.) |
| 12 | 327 | Philadelphia Eagles | Judd Garrett | RB | Princeton | |
| 12 | 328 | Los Angeles Rams | David Lang | RB | Northern Arizona | |
| 12 | 329 | New York Giants | Matt Stover ^{†} | K | Louisiana Tech | |
| 12 | 330 | Phoenix Cardinals | Ken McMichel | DB | Oklahoma | from Denver (Note: No. 330: Denver → Phoenix (PD). Denver traded a twelfth-round selection (330th overall) to Phoenix in exchange for K David Treadwell.) |
| 12 | 331 | Los Angeles Rams | Demetrius Davis | TE | Nevada | from San Francisco (Note: No. 331: San Francisco → LA Rams (PD). San Francisco traded a twelfth-round selection (331st overall) and a 1989 twelfth-round selection to the LA Rams in exchange for a 1989 eleventh-round selection.) |

== Supplemental draft ==
| Rnd. | Pick | Team | Player | Pos. | College | Notes |
|---|---|---|---|---|---|---|
| 1 | — | New York Jets | Rob Moore ^{†} | WR | Syracuse | |
| 9 | — | Phoenix Cardinals | Willie Williams | TE | LSU | |

== Notable undrafted players ==
| † | Pro Bowler | ‡ | Hall of Famer |

| Original NFL team | Player | Pos. | College | Notes |
|---|---|---|---|---|
| Atlanta Falcons | Eric Bergeson | DB | BYU | |
| Chicago Bears | Glenell Sanders | LB | Louisiana Tech | |
| Cincinnati Bengals | Craig Patterson | DE | BYU | |
| Cincinnati Bengals | Kirk Scrafford | G | Montana | |
| Dallas Cowboys | Ken Willis | K | Kentucky | |
| Denver Broncos | Blake Ezor | RB | Michigan State | |
| Denver Broncos | Vernon Turner | RB/WR | Carson–Newman | |
| Detroit Lions | Mike Farr | WR | UCLA | |
| Houston Oilers | Victor James | RB | LSU | |
| Indianapolis Colts | Tony Siragusa | DT | Pittsburgh | |
| Indianapolis Colts | Mike Teeter | DT | Michigan | |
| Indianapolis Colts | Matt Vanderbeek | LB | Michigan State | |
| Kansas City Chiefs | Willie Davis | WR | Central Arkansas | |
| Los Angeles Raiders | Rich Bartlewski | TE | Fresno State | |
| Los Angeles Rams | Derrick Faison | WR | Howard | |
| Los Angeles Rams | Jim Price | TE | Stanford | |
| Miami Dolphins | John Jurkovic | DT | Eastern Illinois | |
| Minnesota Vikings | Dirk Borgognone | K | Pacific | |
| Minnesota Vikings | Pat Eilers | S | Notre Dame | |
| Minnesota Vikings | John Randle^{‡} | DT | Texas A&I | |
| New England Patriots | Tim Hauck | S | Montana | |
| New England Patriots | Don Overton | RB | Fairmont State | |
| New York Giants | Bobby Abrams | LB | Michigan | |
| New York Giants | Troy Kyles | WR | Howard | |
| Philadelphia Eagles | Otis Smith | CB | Missouri | |
| Philadelphia Eagles | Adam Walker | RB | Pittsburgh | |
| Phoenix Cardinals | Amod Field | WR | Montclair State | |
| Phoenix Cardinals | Eldonta Osborne | LB | Louisiana Tech | |
| Pittsburgh Steelers | Kimble Anders ^{†} | FB | Houston | |
| San Francisco 49ers | Ricky Siglar | T | San Jose State | |
| Seattle Seahawks | Derek Loville | RB | Oregon | |
| Seattle Seahawks | Terry Obee | WR | Oregon | |
| Tampa Bay Buccaneers | Steve Christie | K | William & Mary | |

== Hall of Famers ==
- Emmitt Smith, running back from University of Florida taken 1st round, 17th overall by the Dallas Cowboys.

Inducted: Professional Football Hall of Fame class of 2010

- John Randle, defensive tackle from Texas A&M-Kingsville University, Undrafted.

Inducted: Professional Football Hall of Fame class of 2010

- Shannon Sharpe, tight end from Savannah State University, taken 7th round, 192nd overall by the Denver Broncos.

Inducted: Professional Football Hall of Fame class of 2011

- Cortez Kennedy, defensive tackle from University of Miami, taken 1st round, 3rd overall by the Seattle Seahawks

Inducted: Professional Football Hall of Fame class of 2012

- Junior Seau, linebacker from University of Southern California, taken 1st round, 5th overall by the San Diego Chargers

Inducted: Professional Football Hall of Fame class of 2015 (posthumous)

- LeRoy Butler, safety from Florida State University, taken 2nd round, 48th overall by the Green Bay Packers

Inducted: Professional Football Hall of Fame class of 2022

== Trades ==
In the explanations below, (D) denotes trades that took place during the 1990 Draft, while (PD) indicates trades completed pre-draft.

Round 1

Round 2

Round 3

Round 4

Round 5

Round 6

Round 7

Round 8

Round 9

Round 10

Round 11

Round 12

== Forfeited picks ==
Five selections in the 1990 draft were forfeited:
