= 1989 Houston Cougars football team =

American college football season

1989 Houston Cougars football
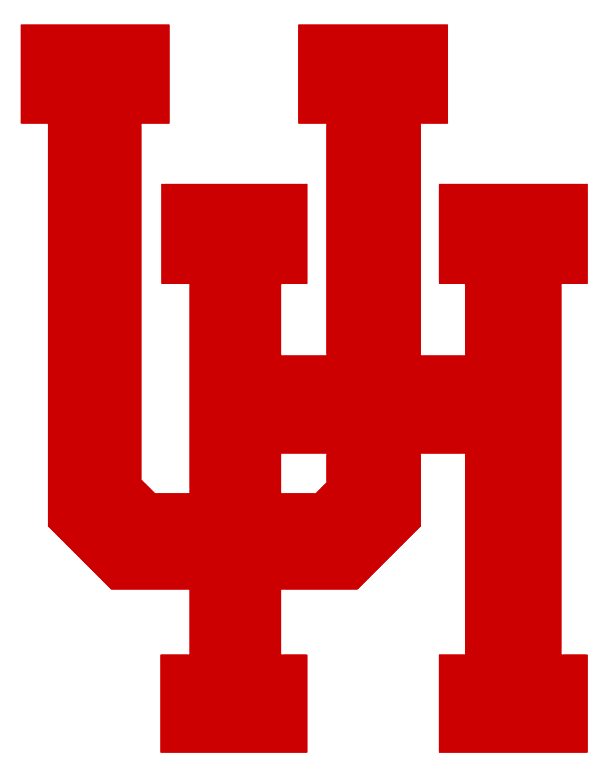
- Conference: Southwest Conference

Ranking
- AP: No. 14
- Record: 9–2 (6–2 SWC)
- Head coach: Jack Pardee (3rd season)
- Offensive coordinator: John Jenkins (3rd season)
- Offensive scheme: Run and shoot
- Defensive coordinator: Jim Eddy (3rd season)
- Base defense: 4–3
- Captains: Kimble Anders; Joey Banes; Tyrone Jones; Alton Montgomery
- Home stadium: Houston Astrodome

1989 Southwest Conference football standings
	Conf.					Overall
Team	W		L		T	W		L		T
No. 13 Arkansas $	7	–	1	–	0	10	–	2	–	0
No. 20 Texas A&M	6	–	2	–	0	8	–	4	–	0
No. 14 Houston	6	–	2	–	0	9	–	2	–	0
No. 19 Texas Tech	5	–	3	–	0	9	–	3	–	0
Baylor	4	–	4	–	0	5	–	6	–	0
Texas	4	–	4	–	0	5	–	6	–	0
TCU	2	–	6	–	0	4	–	7	–	0
Rice	2	–	6	–	0	2	–	8	–	1
SMU	0	–	8	–	0	2	–	9	–	0
$ – Conference champion; Rankings from AP Poll

The 1989 Houston Cougars football team, also known as the Houston Cougars, Houston, or UH, represented the University of Houston in the 1989 NCAA Division I-A football season. It was the 44th year of season play for Houston. The team was coached by third-year head coach Jack Pardee. Serving as offensive coordinator was John Jenkins, who succeeded Pardee as head coach following the season. The team played its games off-campus at the Astrodome, which had recently received upgrades to seat 62,439 spectators.

These Cougars boasted the first squad to have a 4,000-yard passer (Andre Ware), 1,000-yard rusher (Chuck Weatherspoon), and 1,000-yard receiver (Manny Hazard) in FBS history, finishing the season ranked as No. 14 by the AP Poll. Junior quarterback Andre Ware won the Heisman Trophy and Davey O'Brien Award following the conclusion of the season. Under probation by the NCAA from rules violated in prior seasons under longtime coach Bill Yeoman, Houston was ineligible for participation in a bowl game and could not be listed in the Coaches Poll. The Cougars were also barred from live television.

Ware became the first Black quarterback to win the Heisman Trophy when he threw for 4,699 yards, 46 touchdowns, and set 27 NCAA records. Many of the records were thanks to the innovative use of the run and shoot offense, which his successor, David Klingler, also used to great effect. The Cougars ended the season ranked the No. 14 team in the nation by the Associated Press. Ware then declared for the NFL draft, foregoing his senior year.

== Schedule ==
Date	Opponent	Rank	Site	Result	Attendance	Source
September 2	at UNLV*	No. 21	Sam Boyd Silver Bowl; Whitney, NV	W 69–0	22,416	
September 23	at Arizona State*	No. 17	Sun Devil Stadium; Tempe, AZ	W 36–7	67,357	
September 30	Temple*	No. 14	Houston Astrodome; Houston, TX	W 65–7	15,121	
October 7	Baylor	No. 12	Houston Astrodome; Houston, TX (rivalry)	W 66–10	31,433	
October 14	at Texas A&M	No. 8	Kyle Field; College Station, TX	L 13–17	66,423	
October 21	SMU^{†}	No. 16	Houston Astrodome; Houston, TX (rivalry)	W 95–21	20,009	
October 28	at No. 13 Arkansas	No. 12	War Memorial Stadium; Little Rock, AR	L 39–45	55,112	
November 4	at TCU	No. 17	Amon G. Carter Stadium; Fort Worth, TX	W 55–10	19,212	
November 11	Texas	No. 15	Houston Astrodome; Houston, TX	W 47–9	45,586	
November 25	No. 18 Texas Tech	No. 13	Houston Astrodome; Houston, TX (rivalry)	W 40–24	30,097	
December 2	at Rice	No. 13	Rice Stadium; Houston, TX (rivalry)	W 64–0	22,700	
*Non-conference game; ^{†}Homecoming; Rankings from AP Poll released prior to the game

== Rankings ==
Week-to-Week Rankings Legend: ██ Increase in ranking. ██ Decrease in ranking. ██ Not ranked the previous week.
Poll	Pre	Wk 1	Wk 2	Wk 3	Wk 4	Wk 5	Wk 6	Wk 7	Wk 8	Wk 9	Wk 10	Wk 11	Wk 12	Wk 13	Wk 14	Wk 15	Final
AP	21	22	18	17	14	12	8	16	12	17	15	13	13	13	13	13	14
Coaches'	Ineligible (on probation)																

== Game summaries ==
=== SMU ===
SMU at Houston

Team	1	2	3	4	Total
Mustangs	6	8	7	0	21
• No. 16 Cougars	24	35	22	14	95

- Date: October 21
- Location: Astrodome, Houston, Texas
- Game attendance: 20,009
- Game weather: Indoors
- Source: Box Score and Game Story

Scoring summary
1	HOU	Anderson 28-yard field goal	Houston 3–0
1	HOU	Weatherspoon 2-yard run (Anderson kick)	Houston 10–0
1	HOU	Weatherspoon 54-yard run (Anderson kick)	Houston 17–0
1	SMU	Ballard fumble recovery in end zone (kick blocked)	Houston 17–6
1	HOU	P. Smith 62-yard pass from Andre Ware (Anderson kick)	Houston 24–6
2	HOU	Cooper 7-yard pass from Ware (Anderson kick)	Houston 31–6
2	SMU	Beard 2-yard pass from Mike Romo (Collins pass from Lawson)	Houston 31–14
2	HOU	Williams 40-yard pass from Ware (Anderson kick)	Houston 38–14
2	HOU	Hazard 3-yard pass from Ware (Anderson kick)	Houston 45–14
2	HOU	Williams 87-yard pass from Ware (Anderson kick)	Houston 52–14
2	HOU	Hazard 28-yard pass from Ware (Anderson kick)	Houston 59–14
3	HOU	Hazard 46-yard pass from David Klingler (Anderson kick)	Houston 66–14
3	SMU	Love 26-yard run (Lomerick kick)	Houston 66–21
3	HOU	Weatherspoon 22-yard run (Anderson kick)	Houston 73–21
3	HOU	P. Smith 53-yard pass from Klingler (Perry run)	Houston 81–21
4	HOU	P. Smith 74-yard pass from Klingler (Anderson kick)	Houston 88–21
4	HOU	Cooper 16-yard pass from Klingler (Anderson kick)	Houston 95–21

Houston shattered the NCAA record for total offense with 1,021 yards, and set the mark for passing yards with 771. Andre Ware threw for 517 yards and 6 touchdowns while completing 25 of 41 attempts, and did not play in the second half. Backup David Klingler threw for 254 yards and 4 touchdowns in the second half. Paul Smith caught 6 passes for 255 yards and 3 touchdowns. Chuck Weatherspoon rushed 15 times for 207 yards and 3 touchdowns.

=== Texas ===
Texas at Houston

Team	1	2	3	4	Total
Longhorns	3	6	0	0	9
• No. 15 Cougars	6	21	14	6	47

- Date: November 11
- Location: Astrodome, Houston, Texas
- Game start: 4:02 pm CST
- Elapsed time: 3:25
- Game attendance: 45,586
- Game weather: Indoors
- Referee: Joe Thomas
- Source: Box Score

Scoring summary
1	8:26	TEX	Clements 25-yard field goal	Texas 3–0
1	3:27	HOU	Anderson 24-yard field goal	Tied 3–3
1	2:17	HOU	Anderson 38-yard field goal	Houston 6–3
2	13:00	HOU	Anders 18-yard pass from Ware (Anderson kick)	Houston 13–3
2	6:43	TEX	Clements 52-yard field goal	Houston 13–6
2	1:40	HOU	Hazard 38-yard pass from Ware (Anderson kick)	Houston 20–6
2	0:44	HOU	Anders 31-yard pass from Ware (Anderson kick)	Houston 27–6
2	0:00	TEX	Clements 47-yard field goal	Houston 27–9
3	11:08	HOU	Weatherspoon 60-yard run (Anderson kick)	Houston 34–9
3	8:12	HOU	Hazard 9-yard pass from Ware (Anderson kick)	Houston 41–9
4	10:39	HOU	Anderson 33-yard field goal	Houston 44–9
4	4:28	HOU	Anderson 36-yard field goal	Houston 47–9

== Roster ==
1989 Houston Cougars football team roster
Players
Coaches
Offense

Pos.	#	Name	Class
OL		Joey Banes	Sr
WR	20	Manny Hazard	Jr
QB	7	David Klingler	So
QB	11	Andre Ware	Jr
RB	28	Chuck Weatherspoon	Jr

Defense

Pos.	#	Name	Class
LB		Reggie Burnette	Jr
DB		Chris Ellison	Sr
LB	46	Lamar Lathon	Sr
SS	29	Alton Montgomery	Sr
DT	96	Alfred Oglesby	Sr
DB		Cornelius Price
DT	63	Craig Veasey	Sr

Special teams

Pos.	#	Name	Class
K		Roman Anderson	So

Head coach

- Jack Pardee

Coordinators/assistant coaches

- John Jenkins – Offensive coordinator
- Jim Eddy – Defensive Coordinator

Legend

- (C) Team captain
- (S) Suspended
- (I) Ineligible
- Injured
- Redshirt

== Awards and honors ==
- Andre Ware, Heisman Trophy
- Andre Ware, Davey O`Brien Award

== Team players in the NFL ==
Player	Position	Round	Pick	NFL club
Andre Ware	Quarterback	1	7	Detroit Lions
Lamar Lathon	Linebacker	1	15	Houston Oilers
Alton Montgomery	Defensive back	2	52	Denver Broncos
Alfred Oglesby	Nose tackle	3	66	Miami Dolphins
Craig Veasey	Defensive tackle	3	81	Pittsburgh Steelers
Chris Ellison	Defensive back	11	278	Atlanta Falcons
Joey Banes	Tackle	11	295	Houston Oilers

- Note: David Klingler was drafted into the NFL in 1992.
