= 1989 Arkansas Razorbacks football team =

American college football season

1989 Arkansas Razorbacks football

SWC champion

Cotton Bowl Classic, L 27–31 vs. Tennessee
- Conference: Southwest Conference

Ranking
- Coaches: No. 13
- AP: No. 13
- Record: 10–2 (7–1 SWC)
- Head coach: Ken Hatfield (6th season)
- Offensive coordinator: Jack Crowe (1st season)
- Offensive scheme: Option
- Defensive coordinator: Bob Trott (1st season)
- Captains: Anthoney Cooney; Elbert Crawford; Tim Horton; Michael Shepherd
- Home stadium: Razorback Stadium; War Memorial Stadium

1989 Southwest Conference football standings
	Conf.					Overall
Team	W		L		T	W		L		T
No. 13 Arkansas $	7	–	1	–	0	10	–	2	–	0
No. 20 Texas A&M	6	–	2	–	0	8	–	4	–	0
No. 14 Houston	6	–	2	–	0	9	–	2	–	0
No. 19 Texas Tech	5	–	3	–	0	9	–	3	–	0
Baylor	4	–	4	–	0	5	–	6	–	0
Texas	4	–	4	–	0	5	–	6	–	0
TCU	2	–	6	–	0	4	–	7	–	0
Rice	2	–	6	–	0	2	–	8	–	1
SMU	0	–	8	–	0	2	–	9	–	0
$ – Conference champion; Rankings from AP Poll

The 1989 Arkansas Razorbacks football team represented the University of Arkansas as a member of the Southwest Conference (SWC) during the 1989 NCAA Division I-A football season. Led by Ken Hatfield in his sixth and final season as head coach, the Razorbacks compiled an overall record of 10–2 with a mark of 7–1 in conference play, winning the SWC title for the second consecutive year. Arkansas was invited to the Cotton Bowl Classic, where the Razorbacks lost to Tennessee. The team played their home games at Razorback Stadium in Fayetteville, Arkansas and War Memorial Stadium in Little Rock, Arkansas.

Arkansas' victory over Texas A&M at Kyle Field in College Station broke the Aggies' win streak of 22 consecutive SWC victories at home.

Offensive tackle Jim Mabry was a consensus All-American for the Hogs. Kicker Todd Wright was named to the Freshman All-American Team after converting 20 of 23 field goals on the year, including a 51-yard field goal against UTEP. His average of 1.82 per game tied as best in the SWC, and was surpassed only by future NFL kicker Chris Gardocki from Clemson. As a team, the Razorbacks were the seventh-best rushing offense in college football, with an average of 314.2 yards per game on the ground.

Ken Hatfield led Arkansas to back-to-back SWC titles in 1988 and 1989, coaching the Razorbacks to an overall record of 20–4 and 14-1 against conference opponents over those two seasons. However, due to a sour relationship with athletic director Frank Broyles, Hatfield left Arkansas to become the head football coach of Clemson University after the season. Hatfield accepted the Clemson job without ever visiting the campus prior to his hiring.

== Schedule ==
Date	Opponent	Rank	Site	TV	Result	Attendance	Source
September 16	Tulsa*	No. 9	Razorback Stadium; Fayetteville, AR		W 26–7	51,518	
September 23	at Ole Miss*	No. 8	Mississippi Veterans Memorial Stadium; Jackson, MS (rivalry)		W 24–17	55,000	
September 30	UTEP*	No. 8	War Memorial Stadium; Little Rock, AR		W 39–7	48,240	
October 7	at TCU	No. 7	Amon G. Carter Stadium; Fort Worth, TX		W 41–19	25,734	
October 14	at Texas Tech	No. 7	Jones Stadium; Lubbock, TX (rivalry)		W 45–13	47,520	
October 21	Texas	No. 7	Razorback Stadium; Fayetteville, AR (rivalry)	Raycom	L 20–24	53,316	
October 28	No. 12 Houston	No. 18	War Memorial Stadium; Little Rock, AR		W 45–39	55,112	
November 4	at Rice	No. 11	Rice Stadium; Houston, TX	Raycom	W 38–17	11,800	
November 11	Baylor	No. 10	Razorback Stadium; Fayetteville, AR	ESPN	W 19–10	51,352	
November 24	at No. 14 Texas A&M	No. 9	Kyle Field; College Station, TX (rivalry)	CBS	W 23–22	57,876	
December 2	SMU	No. 9	War Memorial Stadium; Little Rock, AR		W 38–24	47,112	
January 1	vs. No. 8 Tennessee*	No. 10	Cotton Bowl; Dallas, TX (Cotton Bowl Classic)	CBS	L 27–31	74,358	
*Non-conference game; Rankings from AP Poll released prior to the game

== Game summaries ==
=== Texas ===
Texas Longhorns (3–2) at #7 Arkansas Razorbacks (5–0)

Quarter	1	2	3	4	Total
Texas	3	10	8	3	24
Arkansas	7	7	0	6	20

at Razorback Stadium, Fayetteville, Arkansas

- Date: October 21, 1989
- Game weather: Partly cloudy, 60 °F (16 °C)
- Game attendance: 53,818
- Referee: Frank Sheppard
- TV: Raycom
- Box Score

External videos
- Full game

Team	Category	Player	Statistics
Texas	Passing	Peter Gardere	16/20, 247 Yds, TD
Texas	Rushing	Chris Samuels	12 Rush, 55 Yds
Texas	Receiving	Tony Jones	4 Rec, 114 Yds, TD
Arkansas	Passing		
Arkansas	Rushing		
Arkansas	Receiving		

Scoring summary

Quarter	Time	Drive			Team	Scoring information	Score	
Quarter	Time	Plays	Yards	TOP	Team	Scoring information	UT	AU
1	9:52	10	63	5:00	Texas	34-yard field goal by Wayne Clements	3	0
1	0:21	1	6	0:03	Arkansas	E.D. Jackson 6-yard touchdown run, Todd Wright kick good	3	7
2	11:50	1	61	0:09	Texas	Tony Jones 61-yard touchdown reception from Peter Gardere, Wayne Clements kick good	10	7
2	8:21	7	80	3:29	Arkansas	Billy Winston 9-yard touchdown reception from Quinn Grovey, Todd Wright kick good	10	14
2	3:03	11	74	5:18	Texas	24-yard field goal by Wayne Clements	13	14
3	8:24	14	80	6:25	Texas	Winfred Tubbs 1-yard touchdown run, 2-point run good	21	14
4	13:24	9	36	3:53	Texas	42-yard field goal by Wayne Clements	24	14
4	0:14	12	80	4:50	Arkansas	Barry Foster 10-yard touchdown run, 2-point run failed	24	20
"TOP" = time of possession. For other American football terms, see Glossary of American football.							24	20

== Roster ==
1989 Arkansas Razorbacks football team roster
Players
Coaches
Offense

Pos.	#	Name	Class
RB	18	Barry Foster	Jr
QB	4	Quinn Grovey	Jr
RB	22	Ron Dickerson Jr	Fr
OL	56	Jim Mabry	Sr
WR	3	Tim Horton	Sr
RB		E.D. Jackson
WR	2	Derek Russell	Jr
RB	35	James Rouse	Sr
TE	86	Billy Winston	Sr

Defense

Pos.	#	Name	Class
LB	48	Mick Thomas	Jr
DL	98	Michael Shepherd	Sr

Special teams

Pos.	#	Name	Class
K	11	Todd Wright	Fr
K	17	Glen Hines	Jr

Head coach

- Ken Hatfield

Coordinators/assistant coaches

- Jack Crowe – Offensive coordinator

Legend

- (C) Team captain
- (S) Suspended
- (I) Ineligible
- Injured
- Redshirt
