= Paul Hackett (American football) =

American football player and coach (born 1947)

Biographical details
- Born: July 5, 1947 (age 79); Burlington, Vermont, U.S.

Playing career
- 1966–1968: UC Davis
- Position: Quarterback

Coaching career (HC unless noted)
- 1969: UC Davis (assistant freshman)
- 1970–1971: UC Davis (freshman)
- 1972–1973: California (GA)
- 1974–1975: California (QB)
- 1976–1977: USC (QB/WR)
- 1978–1980: USC (QB/PGC)
- 1981–1982: Cleveland Browns (QB)
- 1983–1985: San Francisco 49ers (QB/WR/TE)
- 1986–1988: Dallas Cowboys (PGC)
- 1989: Pittsburgh (OC/QB)
- 1989–1992: Pittsburgh
- 1993–1997: Kansas City Chiefs (OC)
- 1998–2000: USC
- 2001–2004: New York Jets (OC)
- 2005–2007: Tampa Bay Buccaneers (QB)
- 2008: Oakland Raiders (special projects)
- 2009–2010: Oakland Raiders (QB)

Head coaching record
- Overall: 33–37–1
- Bowls: 1–1

Accomplishments and honors

Championships
- Super Bowl champion (XIX)

Paul Roger Hackett (born July 5, 1947) is an American former football coach. He served as the head football coach for the University of Pittsburgh from 1989 to 1992 and at the University of Southern California (USC) from 1998 to 2000. He also served as a quarterbacks coach and as an offensive coordinator in the National Football League (NFL).

Hackett began his college coaching career at his alma mater, the UC Davis, in 1969, assisting the freshmen in the first year and then directing them to a 13–0 mark over the next two seasons under College Football Hall of Fame coach Jim Sochor. He then was an assistant at University of California, Berkeley for four years (1972–1975), the first season as a graduate assistant, the next as the receivers coach and the final two as the quarterbacks coach. Then, at age 29, he moved to USC for five years (1976–1980) as an assistant coach under John Robinson.

Hackett then began in the NFL as offensive coordinator for the Cleveland Browns (1981–82), followed by a stint as quarterbacks/receivers coach for the San Francisco 49ers (1983–85)—during which he coached Joe Montana in the 1984 Super Bowl victory—and as offensive coordinator for the Dallas Cowboys (1986–1988).

From 1989 to 1992 Hackett was the head football coach at the University of Pittsburgh. He replaced Mike Gottfried, whom he had served as offensive coordinator, just prior to the 1989 John Hancock Bowl, which resulted in a Pittsburgh victory over Texas A&M.

Hackett then moved back to the NFL as offensive coordinator for the Kansas City Chiefs from 1993 to 1997. He was instrumental in acquiring his quarterback from the 49ers, Joe Montana, to play for the Chiefs from 1993 to 1994. The Chiefs made the playoffs four of five seasons, ranking fifth in offense in his last year.

Hackett moved back to college football as head coach at USC from 1998 until 2000, prior to Pete Carroll taking over. During the first season he guided the Trojans to the 1998 Sun Bowl, losing in a major upset to TCU. Hackett's final two years at the school were difficult, as the fans and alumni base turned against him. His 1999 and 2000 Trojans football teams were the first USC teams to have consecutive non-winning seasons since 1960 and 1961. The 2000 team was tied for last place in the Pacific-10 Conference. His winning percentage as USC coach was .514, compared to the school's then all-time win percentage of .691. USC fired Hackett on November 27, 2000; to do so, it spent $800,000 to buy out the remaining two years of his five-year, $3.5-million contract. Hackett felt he was clearly not given enough time to rebuild and develop his recruits, such as Carson Palmer. "In two years, I expect to see this team explode," he said. He was proved correct; by 2002, the Trojans were ranked fourth in the country with a team built primarily around Hackett's recruits.

After leaving USC, Hackett again returned to the NFL, serving as the offensive coordinator for the New York Jets from 2001 to 2004. He was then the Tampa Bay quarterbacks coach from 2005 to 2007. From 2008 to 2010 here, Hackett worked as the quarterback coach for the Oakland Raiders, after which he retired from coaching. Hackett is married and has two sons, David and Nathaniel.

== Head coaching record ==
Year	Team	Overall	Conference	Standing	Bowl/playoffs	Coaches^{#}	AP^{°}
Pittsburgh Panthers (NCAA Division I-A independent) (1989–1990)
1989	Pittsburgh	1–0 (Note: Hackett only coached the John Hancock Bowl, replacing Mike Gottfried.)			W John Hancock	19	17
1990	Pittsburgh	3–7–1					
Pittsburgh Panthers (Big East Conference) (1991–1992)
1991	Pittsburgh	6–5	3–2	4th			
1992	Pittsburgh	3–8 (Note: Final game of season coached by Sal Sunseri)	1–3	6th			
Pittsburgh:		13–20–1	4–5				
USC Trojans (Pacific-10 Conference) (1998–2000)
1998	USC	8–5	5–3	T–3rd	L Sun		
1999	USC	6–6	3–5	T–6th			
2000	USC	5–7	2–6	T–8th			
USC:		19–18	10–14				
Total:		32–38–1					
^{#}Rankings from final Coaches Poll.; ^{°}Rankings from final AP Poll.
