= 1989 John Hancock Bowl =

American college football game

- 56th Sun Bowl
| Pittsburgh Panthers | Texas A&M Aggies |
| (7–3–1) | (8–3) |
| Independent | SWC |
| 31 | 28 |
| Head coach: Paul Hackett (interim) | Head coach: R. C. Slocum |
| AP / Coaches; 24 / NR | AP / Coaches; 16 / 15 |
| | 1 | 2 | 3 | 4 | Total |
|---|---|---|---|---|---|
| Pittsburgh | 7 | 10 | 7 | 7 | 31 |
| Texas A&M | 7 | 3 | 12 | 6 | 28 |
- Date: December 30, 1989
- Season: 1989
- Stadium: Sun Bowl
- Location: El Paso, Texas
- MVP: QB Alex Van Pelt
- Referee: Guy Gibbs (WAC)
- Attendance: 44,887

United States TV coverage
- Network: CBS
- Announcers: Tim Brant & Dan Jiggets; Sideline reporters: Greg Gumbel & Lesley Visser

The 1989 John Hancock Bowl was a college football postseason bowl game between the Texas A&M Aggies of the Southwest Conference and the independent Pittsburgh Panthers. The Panthers, who entered ranked 24th in the Associated Press poll but unranked in the coaches' poll, defeated the Aggies, ranked 16th by the AP and 15th by the coaches, by a final score of 31–28.

This was the first time in the history of the bowl that it carried a name other than the Sun Bowl, which had been the name of the game since its inauguration.

== Background ==
The Aggies were in their first season under head coach R.C. Slocum, who took over the program following Jackie Sherrill's resignation at the end of the previous season. Slocum, who had been an assistant coach with Texas A&M for most of the previous fifteen seasons, led the Aggies to an 8–3 regular season, which was tied with Houston for second in the SWC. Texas A&M made its first bowl since 1987, as well as their first trip to El Paso since January 1977.

The Panthers ended the regular season at 7–3–1, but differences between head coach Mike Gottfried and athletic director Ed Bozik led to Gottfried being fired eleven days before the John Hancock Bowl. Pitt's offensive coordinator, Paul Hackett, was promoted to head coach. The Panthers were appearing in their first bowl since 1987, when they were invited to the final Astro-Bluebonnet Bowl, and only their second since 1983 when they played in the Fiesta Bowl.

=== Naming rights issue ===
In 1986, the organizers of the Sun Bowl struck an agreement with John Hancock Financial to serve as a title sponsor for the game. After three seasons as the title sponsor, John Hancock felt it was not getting the exposure it desired with their sponsorship and asked the bowl organizers to change the name of the game. The sides agreed, and in June 1989 it was announced that John Hancock would assume full naming rights to the Sun Bowl; this resulted in the game becoming known as the John Hancock Bowl. The game would remain branded as the John Hancock Bowl until 1993, after which the licensing agreement was not renewed. The Sun Bowl name was reinstated beginning with the 1994 playing.

== Game summary ==
An 8-play, 93-yard drive by the Panthers led to a Curvin Richards 12-yard touchdown run to give them a 7–0 lead less than six minutes into the game. A&M responded with an 11-play, 80-yard drive complete with a Lance Pavlas 9-yard touchdown run to tie the game with :16 in the first quarter. Ed Frazier's 24-yard field goal gave the Panthers the lead back at 10–7. Layne Talbot tied the game with a field goal of his own, from 39 yards. With :18 seconds remaining in the half, Ronald Redmond caught an 8-yard pass from Alex Van Pelt or a touchdown to give the Panthers a 17–10 lead. In the second half, Van Pelt ran in for a touchdown to give them a 24–10 lead. The Aggies soon went on the charge, responding with a Keith McAfee touchdown run to narrow the lead. However, their conversion attempt failed when Brian Ross fell short, making the margin stay at eight. McAfee rushed for another touchdown with :05 remaining in the quarter. On their second conversion attempt, the pass fell short, leaving the score at 24–22. A&M responded with another score, this time on a Randy Simmons touchdown run, to finally give them the lead, with 9:32 remaining. Once again however, their conversion attempt fell short, leaving it at 28–24. Pittsburgh went on a 9-play, 84-yard drive in two minutes, culminating in a Henry Tuten catch of Van Pelt's 44-yard pass for a touchdown to give the Panthers the lead with two minutes remaining. A&M was given one last chance, with the ball at their own 21. They managed to get to the 47 yard line, but on 3rd down with 1:05 remaining, Pavlas' pass was intercepted by Threats, and the Panthers ran out the rest of the time to win. Alex Van Pelt was named MVP for his performance in the game, in which he threw 20-of-40 for 354 yards, 2 touchdowns, and 1 interception. Curvin Richards went for 156 yards on 23 carries and 1 touchdown. In a losing effort, Keith McAfee went for 94 yards on 15 carries for 2 touchdowns.

== Aftermath ==
Hackett would be Pittsburgh's coach for the next three seasons, but he was fired before the final game after amassing a 12–20–1 record. Slocum and the Aggies would win three SWC titles in the next four years.

== Statistics ==
| Statistics | Pittsburgh | Texas A&M |
|---|---|---|
| First downs | 22 | 21 |
| Yards rushing | 176 | 252 |
| Yards passing | 354 | 196 |
| Total yards | 530 | 448 |
| Punts-Average | 5-42.4 | 4-46.8 |
| Fumbles-Lost | 2-1 | 1–0 |
| Interceptions | 1 | 3 |
| Penalties-Yards | 4-19 | 8-65 |
