= 1989 SMU Mustangs football team =

American college football season

1989 SMU Mustangs football
- Conference: Southwest Conference
- Record: 2–9 (0–8 SWC)
- Head coach: Forrest Gregg (1st season)
- Offensive coordinator: Tom Rossley (1st season)
- Offensive scheme: Run and shoot
- Defensive coordinator: Dale Lindsey (1st season)
- Base defense: 3–4
- Home stadium: Ownby Stadium

1989 Southwest Conference football standings
	Conf.					Overall
Team	W		L		T	W		L		T
No. 13 Arkansas $	7	–	1	–	0	10	–	2	–	0
No. 20 Texas A&M	6	–	2	–	0	8	–	4	–	0
No. 14 Houston	6	–	2	–	0	9	–	2	–	0
No. 19 Texas Tech	5	–	3	–	0	9	–	3	–	0
Baylor	4	–	4	–	0	5	–	6	–	0
Texas	4	–	4	–	0	5	–	6	–	0
TCU	2	–	6	–	0	4	–	7	–	0
Rice	2	–	6	–	0	2	–	8	–	1
SMU	0	–	8	–	0	2	–	9	–	0
$ – Conference champion; Rankings from AP Poll

The 1989 SMU Mustangs football team represented Southern Methodist University (SMU) as a member of the Southwest Conference (SWC) during the 1989 NCAA Division I-A football season. Led by first-year head coach Forrest Gregg, the Mustangs were returning to competition for the first time since 1986. An NCAA investigation into continued misconduct in the football program had resulted in the Mustangs receiving the "death penalty", which resulted in the 1987 season being cancelled and indirectly resulted in the team not having enough players to field a team in 1988. After playing most of the past several seasons at Texas Stadium, the Mustangs moved back to their old home of Ownby Stadium on campus, where they had not played since 1948.

The Mustangs recorded a record of 2-9, finishing last in the Southwest Conference where they failed to record a victory. Both of those wins came against opponents from the lower Division I-AA level, as SMU beat Connecticut and North Texas. The team allowed 499 points on defense and gave up 50 or more three times, including their game against conference rival Houston where they gave up 95.

== "Ponygate" ==
Throughout the late 1970s and mid-1980s the SMU football program had been investigated and punished several times by the NCAA for recruiting violations. The most egregious violation was a slush fund to attract players to play for the SMU football team. The repeated violations resulted in the football program ultimately receiving the death penalty, with the NCAA's infractions committee voting unanimously to cancel the Mustangs' 1987 season and the team's four scheduled home games in 1988.

The team was placed on probation until 1990, was banned from bowl games until 1989, and could not be televised on national television until 1989. The program would lose 55 scholarships over four years and could only hire five assistant coaches instead of the usual nine. The program was also barred from off-campus recruiting until August 1988 and paid campus visits were forbidden until the 1988–89 school year. As a result of the penalties, the program granted a full release to every player on the roster that resulted in other universities recruiting SMU players.

On February 27, 1987, two days after the sanctions were announced, acting athletic director Dudley Parker stated he was unsure if the program could field a team for the 1988 season. Two months later, on April 11, university president William Stallcup formally cancelled the 1988 season, citing concerns over injuries to potential players and having to rely on a high number of walk-ons with only a few scholarship players remaining.

== Return to football ==
Hall of Fame lineman and SMU alum Forrest Gregg was hired as the program's head coach in January 1988; at the time, Gregg was the head coach for the Green Bay Packers and resigned and took a pay cut for the SMU job. Gregg was personally asked to take the head coaching position by Stalcup. The first player Gregg recruited was quarterback Mike Romo from San Antonio.

Gregg and his staff had to rebuild the football program practically from scratch. By the time of the team's week one game against Rice, only one scholarship player, senior wide receiver Mitchell Gleiber, remained from the 1986 team. The Mustangs' week one roster consisted of 89 players, with 73 being freshmen, and 41 were on scholarship. The starting lineup against Rice consisted of 15 freshmen, two sophomores, and three seniors. In their first game since November 22, 1986, the Mustangs lost 35–6 to Rice; the Owls' victory snapped a 18 game losing streak.

== Schedule ==
Date	Opponent	Site	Result	Attendance	Source
September 2	Rice	Ownby Stadium; University Park, TX (rivalry)	L 6–35	23,227	
September 16	Connecticut*	Ownby Stadium; University Park, TX	W 31–30	20,548	
September 23	Texas	Ownby Stadium; University Park, TX	L 13–45	23,733	
September 30	at TCU	Amon G. Carter Stadium; Fort Worth, TX (rivalry)	L 10–28	26,023	
October 14	Baylor	Ownby Stadium; University Park, TX	L 3–49	21,434	
October 21	at No. 16 Houston	Houston Astrodome; Houston, TX (rivalry)	L 21–95	20,009	
October 28	North Texas*^{†}	Ownby Stadium; University Park, TX (rivalry)	W 35–9	21,186	
November 4	at No. 20 Texas A&M	Kyle Field; College Station, TX	L 14–63	48,948	
November 11	at No. 1 Notre Dame*	Notre Dame Stadium; Notre Dame, IN	L 6–59	59,075	
November 18	No. 20 Texas Tech	Ownby Stadium; University Park, TX	L 24–48	21,865	
December 2	at No. 9 Arkansas	War Memorial Stadium; Little Rock, AR	L 24–38	47,112	
*Non-conference game; ^{†}Homecoming; Rankings from AP Poll released prior to the game

== Personnel ==
1989 SMU Mustangs football team roster
Players
Coaches
Offense

Pos.	#	Name	Class
QB-P		Ryan Lawson
WR		Greg Ballard
WR		Korey Beard
WR		Andy Bergfeld
WR		Michael Bowen
OL		Kyle Carroll
QB, P		Casey Clyce
QB		Dan Freiburger
OL		Tre Giller
WR		Mitch Glieber
WR		Brent Harraman
OL		Matt Hart
RB		Rongea Hill
RB		Stuart Ison
TE, P		Marklen Kennedy
RB		Marty Kidd
WR		Simeon Knight
RB		Kevin Love
QB		Mike Romo
OL		Oscar Rosales
RB		Omar Thompson
OL		Curtis Eldridge
WR		Derwin Ware
OL		Matt Wisenbaker
RB		Jason Wolf

Defense

Pos.	#	Name	Class
LB		Jason Bednarz
WR		Korey Beard
DL		Steve Benotti
DB		Malcolm Borlenghi
DB		Cary Brabham
DB		Richie Butler
LB		Chris Collins
DB		Ron Hagen
LB		Darren Harrington
LB		Bill Kiely
DL		Geoff King
DB		Marcus Malonson
DB		Mark Martinez
DL		Uzo Okeke
LB		Mike Ostos
WR		Korey Beard
WR		Korey Beard
WR		Korey Beard
DL		Kenny Rea
DB		Marcello Simmons

Special teams

Pos.	#	Name	Class
K		Matt Lomenick

Head coach

- Forrest Gregg

Coordinators/assistant coaches

Legend

- (C) Team captain
- (S) Suspended
- (I) Ineligible
- Injured
- Redshirt

== Season summary ==
=== at No. 16 Houston ===
SMU Mustangs at No. 16 Houston Cougars – Game summary

Quarter	1	2	3	4	Total
Mustangs	6	8	7	0	21
No. 16 Cougars	24	35	22	14	95

at Astrodome, Houston, Texas

- Date: October 21
- Game weather: Indoors (dome)
- Game attendance: 20,009
- Box score

Game information

First quarter

- HOU – Roman Anderson 28-yard field goal. Cougars 3–0.
- HOU – Chuck Weatherspoon 2-yard run (Roman Anderson kick). Cougars 10–0.
- HOU – Chuck Weatherspoon 54-yard run (Roman Anderson kick). Cougars 17–0.
- SMU – Greg Ballard fumble recovery in end zone (kick blocked). Cougars 17–6.
- HOU – Paul Smith 62-yard pass from Andre Ware (Roman Anderson kick). Cougars 24–6.

Second quarter

- HOU – Patrick Cooper 7-yard pass from Andre Ware (Roman Anderson kick). Cougars 31–6.
- SMU – Korey Beard 2-yard pass from Mike Romo (Collins pass from Lawson). Cougars 31–14.
- HOU – Brian Williams 40-yard pass from Andre Ware (Roman Anderson kick). Cougars 38–14.
- HOU – Manny Hazard 3-yard pass from Andre Ware (Roman Anderson kick). Cougars 45–14.
- HOU – Brian Williams 87-yard pass from Andre Ware (Roman Anderson kick). Cougars 52–14.
- HOU – Manny Hazard 28-yard pass from Andre Ware (Roman Anderson kick). Cougars 59–14.

Third quarter

- HOU – Manny Hazard 46-yard pass from David Klingler (Roman Anderson kick). Cougars 66–14.
- SMU – Kevin Love 26-yard run (Matt Lomenick kick). Cougars 66–21.
- HOU – Chuck Weatherspoon 22-yard run (Roman Anderson kick). Cougars 73–21.
- HOU – Paul Smith 53-yard pass from David Klingler (Perry run). Cougars 81–21.

Fourth quarter

- HOU – Paul Smith 74-yard pass from David Klingler (Roman Anderson kick). Cougars 88–21.
- HOU – Patrick Cooper 16-yard pass from David Klingler (Roman Anderson kick). Cougars 95–21.

Top passers

- SMU – Mike Romo – 27/54, 286 yards, TD, INT
- HOU – Andre Ware – 25/41, 517 yards, 6 TD

Top rushers

- SMU – Kevin Love – 14 rushes, 53 yards, TD
- HOU – Chuck Weatherspoon – 15 rushes, 207 yards, 3 TD

Top receivers

- SMU – Mitch Glieber – 5 receptions, 81 yards
- HOU – Paul Smith – 6 receptions, 255 yards, 3 TD

SMU lost 95–21 to in-state rival Houston. The Cougars finished the game with 1,021 yards of offense, setting the record for most offensive yards in an NCAA game and the only time a team has gained 1,000 or more yards in a single game.

=== at No. 1 Notre Dame ===
SMU Mustangs at No. 1 Notre Dame Fighting Irish

Quarter	1	2	3	4	Total
Mustangs	0	6	0	0	6
No. 1 Fighting Irish	7	35	10	7	59

at Notre Dame Stadium, South Bend, Indiana

- Date: November 11
- Game attendance: 59,075
- Recap/Box Score

Game information

First quarter

- ND – Ricky Watters 35-yard run (Craig Hentrich kick), 6:54. Notre Dame 7–0. Drive: 6 plays, 79 yards.

Second quarter

- ND – Pete Graham 1-yard run (Craig Hentrich kick), 14:22. Notre Dame 14–0.
- SMU – Andy Bergfeld 5-yard pass from Mike Romo (kick blocked), 11:37. Notre Dame 14–6. Drive: 3 plays, 19 yards.
- ND – Andre Jones blocked extra point return, 11:37. Notre Dame 16–6.
- ND – Billy Hackett 34-yard field goal, 8:16. Notre Dame 19–6.
- ND – Ricky Watters 97-yard punt return (Craig Hentrich kick), 7:04. Notre Dame 26–6.
- ND – Anthony Johnson 4-yard run (Craig Hentrich kick), 4:02. Notre Dame 33–6. Drive: 64 yards.
- ND – Safety, Casey Clyce steps out of end zone, 3:00. Notre Dame 35–6.
- ND – Walter Boyd 14-yard run (Craig Hentrich kick), 0:15. Notre Dame 42–6. Drive: 75 yards.

Third quarter

- ND – Rusty Setzer 2-yard run (Craig Hentrich kick), 10:51. Notre Dame 49–6.
- ND – Billy Hackett 32-yard field goal, 5:45. Notre Dame 52–6.

Fourth quarter

- ND – Rod West 1-yard run (Craig Hentrich kick), 3:22. Notre Dame 59–6.

Top passers

- SMU – Mike Romo – 28/54, 194 yards
- ND – Tony Rice – 5/8, 83 yards

Top rushers

- SMU – Kevin Love – 4 rushes, 5 yards
- ND – Ricky Watters – 7 rushes, 69 yards, TD

Top receivers

- SMU – Jason Wolf – 9 receptions, 63 yards
- ND – Raghib Ismail – 4 receptions, 65 yards

External videos
- Full game
