= 1989 All-Southwest Conference football team =

American college football all-star team

The 1989 All-Southwest Conference football team consisted of American football players chosen by various organizations for All-Southwest Conference teams for the 1989 NCAA Division I-A football season. The selectors for the 1989 season included the Associated Press (AP).

== Offensive selections ==
=== Quarterbacks ===
- Andre Ware, Houston (AP-1)
- Quinn Grovey, Arkansas (AP-2)

=== Running backs ===
- James Gray, Texas Tech (AP-1)
- Chuck Weatherspoon, Houston (AP-1)
- Darren Lewis, Texas A&M (AP-2)
- Barry Foster, Arkansas (AP-2)

=== Tight ends ===
- Mike Jones, Texas A&M (AP-1)
- Billy Winston, Arkansas (AP-2)

=== Wide receivers ===
- Manny Hazard, Houston (AP-1)
- Eric Henley, Rice (AP-1)
- Johnny Walker, Texas (AP-2)
- Jason Wolf, SMU (AP-2)

=== Offensive linemen ===
- Jim Mabry, Arkansas (AP-1)
- Richmond Webb, Texas A&M (AP-1)
- Joey Banes, Houston (AP-1)
- Charles Odiorne, Texas Tech (AP-1)
- Matt McCall, Texas A&M (AP-2)
- Mark Henry, Arkansas (AP-2)
- Mike Arthur, Texas A&M, (AP-2)
- Ed Cunningham (AP-2)
- Nathan Richburg, Texas Tech (2nd)
- Mike Sullivan, TCU (2nd)
- Mike Gisler, Houston (2nd)
- Mike Holley, Houston (2nd)

=== Centers ===
- Elbert Crawford, Arkansas (AP-1)
- Byron Forsythe, Houston (2nd)
- Len Wright, Texas Tech (AP-2)

=== Placekickers ===
- Todd Wright, Arkansas (AP-1)
- Roman Anderson, Houston (AP-2)

== Defensive selections ==
=== Defensive lineman ===
- Michael Shepherd, Arkansas (AP-1)
- Alfred Oglesby, Houston (AP-1)
- Craig Veasey, Houston (AP-1)
- Fred Washington, TCU (AP-1)
- Terry Price, Texas A&M (AP-2)
- Ken Hackemack, Texas (AP-2)
- Tom Mathiasmeyer, Texas Tech (2nd)
- Charles Perry, Texas Tech (AP-2)
- Santana Dotson, Baylor (AP-2)

=== Linebackers ===
- James Francis, Baylor (AP-1)
- William Thomas, Texas A&M (AP-1)
- Aaron Wallace, Texas A&M (AP-1)
- Charles Rowe, Texas Tech (AP-2) (tie)
- Ty Mason, Arkansas (AP-2)
- Brian Jones, Texas (AP-2)
- Roosevelt Collins, TCU (2nd)
- OJ Brigance, Rice (AP-2)
- Reggie Burnette, Houston (2nd)

=== Secondary ===
- Cornelius Price, Houston (AP-1)
- Robert Blackmon, Baylor, (AP-1)
- Alton Montgomery, Houston (AP-1)
- Kevin Smith, Texas A&M (AP-1)
- Patrick Williams, Arkansas (AP-2)
- Anthony Cooney, Arkansas (AP-2)
- Mickey Washington, Texas A&M (AP-2)
- Lance Gunn, Texas (AP-2)
- Tracy Saul, Arkansas (AP-2) (tie)
- Sammy Walker, Texas Tech (2nd)
- David Griffin, Rice (2nd)
- Chris Ellison, Houston (2nd)

=== Punters ===
- Pete Rutter, Baylor (AP-1)
- Jamie Simmons, Texas Tech (AP-2)

== Kick Returner ==
- Tracy Saul, Texas Tech (AP-1)

== Miscellaneous ==
- Offensive Player of the Year: Andre Ware, Houston (AP-1)
- Defensive Player of the Year: James Francis, Baylor (AP)
- Coaches of the Year: Spike Dykes, Texas Tech (AP)
- Offensive Newcomer of the Year: Manny Hazard, Houston (AP)
- Defensive Newcomer of the Year: Tracy Saul, Texas Tech (AP)
- Conference champion: Arkansas Razorbacks

== Key ==
AP = Associated Press

== See also ==
1989 College Football All-America Team
