= Jeroy Robinson =

American football player (born 1968)

No. 50, 95
- Position: Linebacker

Personal information
- Born: June 14, 1968 (age 58); Houston, Texas, U.S.
- Listed height: 6 ft 1 in (1.85 m)
- Listed weight: 241 lb (109 kg)

Career information
- High school: Bryan (TX)
- College: Texas A&M
- NFL draft: 1990: 4th round, 82nd overall pick

Career history
- Denver Broncos (1990); Phoenix Cardinals (1990); San Francisco 49ers (1991)*; Houston Oilers (1992)*
- * Offseason or practice squad member only
- Stats at Pro Football Reference

Jeroy Robinson (born June 14, 1968) is an American former professional football player who was a linebacker in the National Football League (NFL). He played college football for the Texas A&M Aggies and was selected in the fourth round of the 1990 NFL Draft with the 82nd overall pick by the Broncos. He played in the NFL for the Denver Broncos and Phoenix Cardinals in 1990.
