= 1989 Rice Owls football team =

American college football season

1989 Rice Owls football
- Conference: Southwest Conference
- Record: 2–8–1 (2–6 SWC)
- Head coach: Fred Goldsmith (1st season)
- Offensive coordinator: Mike Heimerdinger (1st season)
- Defensive coordinator: Craig Bohl (1st season)
- Home stadium: Rice Stadium

1989 Southwest Conference football standings
	Conf.					Overall
Team	W		L		T	W		L		T
No. 13 Arkansas $	7	–	1	–	0	10	–	2	–	0
No. 20 Texas A&M	6	–	2	–	0	8	–	4	–	0
No. 14 Houston	6	–	2	–	0	9	–	2	–	0
No. 19 Texas Tech	5	–	3	–	0	9	–	3	–	0
Baylor	4	–	4	–	0	5	–	6	–	0
Texas	4	–	4	–	0	5	–	6	–	0
TCU	2	–	6	–	0	4	–	7	–	0
Rice	2	–	6	–	0	2	–	8	–	1
SMU	0	–	8	–	0	2	–	9	–	0
$ – Conference champion; Rankings from AP Poll

The 1989 Rice Owls football team was an American football team that represented Rice University in the Southwest Conference during the 1989 NCAA Division I-A football season. In their first year under head coach Fred Goldsmith, the team compiled a 2–8–1 record.

== Schedule ==
Date	Opponent	Site	Result	Attendance	Source
September 2	at SMU	Ownby Stadium; University Park, TX (rivalry)	W 35–6	23,227	
September 9	at Tulane*	Louisiana Superdome; New Orleans, LA	L 19–20	29,469	
September 23	Southwestern Louisiana*	Rice Stadium; Houston, TX	L 3–18	15,200	
September 30	at Wake Forest*	Groves Stadium; Winston-Salem, NC	T 17–17	12,100	
October 7	at Texas	Texas Memorial Stadium; Austin, TX (rivalry)	L 30–31	57,038	
October 14	TCU	Rice Stadium; Houston, TX	L 16–30	12,100	
October 21	at Texas Tech	Jones Stadium; Lubbock, TX	L 25–41	26,902	
October 28	No. 21 Texas A&M	Rice Stadium; Houston, TX	L 7–45	30,900	
November 4	No. 11 Arkansas	Rice Stadium; Houston, TX	L 17–38	11,800	
November 18	at Baylor	Floyd Casey Stadium; Waco, TX	W 6–3	22,133	
December 2	No. 13 Houston	Rice Stadium; Houston, TX (rivalry)	L 0–64	22,700	
*Non-conference game; Rankings from AP Poll released prior to the game
