= Pat Newman (American football) =

American football player (born 1968)

No. 86
- Position: Wide receiver

Personal information
- Born: September 10, 1968 (age 58); Memphis, Tennessee, U.S.
- Listed height: 5 ft 11 in (1.80 m)
- Listed weight: 189 lb (86 kg)

Career information
- High school: Abraham Lincoln (San Diego)
- College: Utah State
- NFL draft: 1990: 10th round, 249th overall pick

Career history
- Minnesota Vikings (1990); New Orleans Saints (1991–1993); Cleveland Browns (1994); Washington Redskins (1995)*
- * Offseason or practice squad member only

Career NFL statistics
- Receptions: 14
- Receiving yards: 175
- Touchdowns: 1
- Stats at Pro Football Reference

Edward Patrick Newman (born September 10, 1968) is an American former professional football player who was a wide receiver in the National Football League (NFL) for the New Orleans Saints and Cleveland Browns. He played college football for the Utah State Aggies. He was selected by the Minnesota Vikings in the tenth round of the 1990 NFL draft.
