= David Lang (American football) =

American football player (1968–2005)

No. 38
- Position: Running back

Personal information
- Born: March 28, 1968; Loma Linda, California, U.S.
- Died: May 21, 2005 (aged 38); Stone Mountain, Georgia, U.S.
- Listed height: 5 ft 11 in (1.80 m)
- Listed weight: 210 lb (95 kg)

Career information
- High school: Eisenhower (CA)
- College: Northern Arizona
- NFL draft: 1990: 12th round, 328th overall pick

Career history
- Los Angeles Rams (1991–1994); Dallas Cowboys (1995)

Awards and highlights
- Super Bowl champion (XXX)

Career NFL statistics
- Games played: 67
- Rushing att-yards: 49–273
- Receptions-yards: 30–388
- Touchdowns: 6
- Stats at Pro Football Reference

David Lang (March 28, 1968 – May 21, 2005) was an American professional football running back in the National Football League (NFL) for the Los Angeles Rams and Dallas Cowboys. He played college football at Northern Arizona University.

== Early life ==
Lang graduated from Eisenhower High School in 1986. He was an All-league selection at running back as a senior.

In track, he anchored the 4 × 100 metres relay team that finished third at the California state finals.

== College career ==
Lang accepted a football scholarship from Northern Arizona University. As a sophomore, he had 47 carries for 240 yards and 14 receptions for 96 yards.

As a junior, he started the first four games, tallying 146 rushing yards and 114 receiving yards, before suffering a knee injury that sidelined him for the rest of the season.

As a senior, he led the team both in rushing with 94 carries for 521 yards and in receiving with 41 receptions for 447 yards. He became the first player in school history to have a game with 100 yards rushing and receiving, rushing for 189 yards (including a 70-yard touchdown) and registering five catches for 112 yards (including an 80-yard touchdown), against the University of Nevada, on November 18. He finished as the team's leading rusher (521 yards) and receiver (447).

He also was a sprinter on the track and field team.

== Professional career ==
=== Los Angeles Rams ===
Lang was selected by the Los Angeles Rams in the 12th round (328th overall) of the 1990 NFL draft, after dropping because he had to miss training camp while serving a 120-day prison sentence for receiving stolen property. He would end up missing the season due to these issues.

In 1991, his speed and versatility allowed him to earn a roster spot playing special teams. He collected 8 special teams tackles and averaged 16.2 yards-per-kickoff return.

In 1992, although he had never played the position before entering the NFL, he was named the starting fullback in the sixth game of the season, replacing an injured Robert Delpino. He finished with career-highs in rushing (203 yards on 33 carries), receiving (18 passes for 283 yards) and touchdowns (6). Against the San Francisco 49ers, he replaced an injured Cleveland Gary, posting 11 carries for 62 yards. Against the Green Bay Packers, he had a 71-yard run. Against the Atlanta Falcons, he set a career-high with 84 receiving yards on 2 receptions, including a 67-yard touchdown catch.

In 1993, he suffered a knee injury in training camp and was sidelined for the first 8 games. He was a backup, registering 29 rushing yards and 45 receiving yards.

In 1994, he led the team with 27 kickoff returns for 626 yards. His 23.2-yard average ranked ninth in the NFC. He also was third on the team with 10 special teams tackles. He suffered a thigh bruise in the fifth game of the season against the Atlanta Falcons, causing him to miss the next 3 contests.

=== Dallas Cowboys ===
On April 27, 1995, he signed with the Dallas Cowboys as a free agent to improve the special teams units and reunited with Ernie Zampese who was his offensive coordinator with the Rams. He was named the special teams captain and set the franchise single-season record for special teams tackles with 30, which was broken the next year by Jim Schwantz (32); the NFL started keeping the stat in 1990.

He was part of the Super Bowl XXX winning team. He was not re-signed after the season and retired.

== Personal life ==
Lang founded the nonprofit organization "Legends by Lang" to mentor urban youths. He was shot and killed on May 21, 2005.
