= Troy Kyles =

American football player (born 1968)

No. 84, 21
- Position: Wide receiver

Personal information
- Born: August 13, 1968 (age 58); Lorain, Ohio, U.S.
- Listed height: 6 ft 1 in (1.85 m)
- Listed weight: 185 lb (84 kg)

Career information
- High school: St. Martin de Porres (Detroit, Michigan)
- College: Howard
- NFL draft: 1990: undrafted

Career history
- New York Giants (1990); San Diego Chargers (1991)*; San Francisco 49ers (1992); Green Bay Packers (1993)*; San Francisco 49ers (1993)*
- * Offseason or practice squad member only

Career NFL statistics
- Receptions: 4
- Receiving yards: 77
- Stats at Pro Football Reference

Troy Thomas Kyles (born August 13, 1968) is an American former professional football player who was a wide receiver in the National Football League (NFL). He played college football for the Howard Bison. Kyles played for the New York Giants in 1990 and the San Francisco 49ers in 1992.
