= Tony Walker (American football) =

American football player (born 1968)

No. 92
- Position: Linebacker

Personal information
- Born: April 2, 1968 (age 58); Birmingham, Alabama, U.S.
- Listed height: 6 ft 3 in (1.91 m)
- Listed weight: 235 lb (107 kg)

Career information
- High school: Phillips
- College: Southeast Missouri State
- NFL draft: 1990: 6th round, 148th overall pick

Career history
- Indianapolis Colts (1990–1993)

Career NFL statistics
- Fumble recoveries: 3
- Sacks: 1
- Stats at Pro Football Reference

Tony Maurice Walker (born April 2, 1968) is an American former professional football player who was a linebacker for the Indianapolis Colts of the National Football League (NFL). He played college football for the Southeast Missouri State Redhawks. He was selected by the Colts in the sixth round of the 1990 NFL draft.
