= 1989 Texas Longhorns football team =

American college football season

1989 Texas Longhorns football
- Conference: Southwest Conference
- Record: 5–6 (4–4 SWC)
- Head coach: David McWilliams (3rd season)
- Offensive coordinator: Lynn Amedee (1st season)
- Defensive coordinator: Leon Fuller (6th season)
- Home stadium: Texas Memorial Stadium

1989 Southwest Conference football standings
	Conf.					Overall
Team	W		L		T	W		L		T
No. 13 Arkansas $	7	–	1	–	0	10	–	2	–	0
No. 20 Texas A&M	6	–	2	–	0	8	–	4	–	0
No. 14 Houston	6	–	2	–	0	9	–	2	–	0
No. 19 Texas Tech	5	–	3	–	0	9	–	3	–	0
Baylor	4	–	4	–	0	5	–	6	–	0
Texas	4	–	4	–	0	5	–	6	–	0
TCU	2	–	6	–	0	4	–	7	–	0
Rice	2	–	6	–	0	2	–	8	–	1
SMU	0	–	8	–	0	2	–	9	–	0
$ – Conference champion; Rankings from AP Poll

The 1989 Texas Longhorns football team represented the University of Texas at Austin as a member of the Southwest Conference (SWC) during the 1989 NCAA Division I-A football season. Led by third-year head coach David McWilliams, the Longhorns compiled an overall record of 5–6 with a mark of 4–4 in conference play, tying for fifth place in the SWC. The team played home games at Texas Memorial Stadium in Austin, Texas.

== Schedule ==
Date	Time	Opponent	Rank	Site	TV	Result	Attendance	Source
September 4	6:30 p.m.	at No. 14 Colorado*		Folsom Field; Boulder, CO	ESPN	L 6–27	47,269	
September 23	12:00 p.m.	at SMU		Ownby Stadium; University Park, TX	Raycom	W 45–13	23,733	
September 30	7:00 p.m.	Penn State*		Texas Memorial Stadium; Austin, TX	HSE	L 10–16	75,232	
October 7	7:00 p.m.	Rice		Texas Memorial Stadium; Austin, TX (rivalry)		W 31–30	57,038	
October 14	2:00 p.m.	vs. No. 15 Oklahoma*		Cotton Bowl; Dallas, TX (Red River Shootout)	Prime	W 28–24	75,587	
October 21	12:00 p.m.	at No. 7 Arkansas	No. 24	Razorback Stadium; Fayetteville, AR (rivalry)	Raycom	W 24–20	53,316	
November 4	1:00 p.m.	Texas Tech	No. 22	Texas Memorial Stadium; Austin, TX (rivalry)	HSE	L 17–24	81,826	
November 11	4:00 p.m.	at No. 15 Houston		Houston Astrodome; Houston, TX	HSE	L 9–47	45,586	
November 18	12:00 p.m.	TCU		Texas Memorial Stadium; Austin, TX (rivalry)	Raycom	W 31–17	50,882	
November 25	12:00 p.m.	Baylor		Texas Memorial Stadium; Austin, TX (rivalry)		L 7–50	49,081	
December 2	3:00 p.m.	at No. 16 Texas A&M		Kyle Field; College Station, TX (rivalry)	ESPN	L 10–21	76,803	
*Non-conference game; Rankings from AP Poll released prior to the game; All times are in Central time

== Game summaries ==
=== vs Oklahoma ===
#15 Oklahoma Sooners (4–1) vs. Texas Longhorns (2–2)

Quarter	1	2	3	4	Total
Oklahoma	7	0	7	10	24
Texas	15	6	0	7	28

at Cotton Bowl, Dallas, Texas

- Date: October 14, 1989
- Game weather: Partly cloudy, 86 °F (30 °C)
- Game attendance: 75,587
- Referee: George Hayward
- TV: PSN
- Box Score, Box Score

External videos
- Johnny Walker's game-winning touchdown reception

Team	Category	Player	Statistics
Oklahoma	Passing		
Oklahoma	Rushing	Mike Gaddis	14 Rush, 130 Yds, TD
Oklahoma	Receiving		
Texas	Passing	Peter Gardere	15/23, 144 Yds, 2 TD, INT
Texas	Rushing	Adrian Walker	16 Rush, 71 Yds
Texas	Receiving	Johnny Walker	5 Rec, 62 Yds, TD

Scoring summary

Quarter	Time	Drive			Team	Scoring information	Score	
Quarter	Time	Plays	Yards	TOP	Team	Scoring information	OU	UT
1	10:02	11	80	4:58	Texas	Tony Jones 7-yard touchdown reception from Peter Gardere, Wayne Clements kick good	0	7
1	8:22	3	71	1:40	Oklahoma	Mike Gaddis 62-yard touchdown run, R.D. Lashar kick good	7	7
1	1:56				Texas	Fumble recovery returned 44 yards for touchdown by Mical Padgett, 2-point pass good	7	15
2	9:39	4	-13	1:07	Texas	42-yard field goal by Wayne Clements	7	18
2	1:16	7	31	2:49	Texas	49-yard field goal by Wayne Clements	7	21
3	6:20	9	83	2:22	Oklahoma	Artie Guess 41-yard touchdown reception from Tink Collins, R.D. Lashar kick good	14	21
4	11:44	5	50	2:08	Oklahoma	44-yard field goal by R.D. Lashar	17	21
4	3:42	8	51	3:10	Oklahoma	Ike Lewis 1-yard touchdown run, R.D. Lashar kick good	24	21
4	1:33	7	66	2:09	Texas	Johnny Walker 25-yard touchdown reception from Peter Gardere, Wayne Clements kick good	24	28
"TOP" = time of possession. For other American football terms, see Glossary of American football.							24	28

=== At Arkansas ===
Texas Longhorns (3–2) at #7 Arkansas Razorbacks (5–0)

Quarter	1	2	3	4	Total
Texas	3	10	8	3	24
Arkansas	7	7	0	6	20

at Razorback Stadium, Fayetteville, Arkansas

- Date: October 21, 1989
- Game weather: Partly cloudy, 60 °F (16 °C)
- Game attendance: 53,818
- Referee: Frank Sheppard
- TV: Raycom
- Box Score

External videos
- Full game

Team	Category	Player	Statistics
Texas	Passing	Peter Gardere	16/20, 247 Yds, TD
Texas	Rushing	Chris Samuels	12 Rush, 55 Yds
Texas	Receiving	Tony Jones	4 Rec, 114 Yds, TD
Arkansas	Passing		
Arkansas	Rushing		
Arkansas	Receiving		

Scoring summary

Quarter	Time	Drive			Team	Scoring information	Score	
Quarter	Time	Plays	Yards	TOP	Team	Scoring information	UT	AU
1	9:52	10	63	5:00	Texas	34-yard field goal by Wayne Clements	3	0
1	0:21	1	6	0:03	Arkansas	E.D. Jackson 6-yard touchdown run, Todd Wright kick good	3	7
2	11:50	1	61	0:09	Texas	Tony Jones 61-yard touchdown reception from Peter Gardere, Wayne Clements kick good	10	7
2	8:21	7	80	3:29	Arkansas	Billy Winston 9-yard touchdown reception from Quinn Grovey, Todd Wright kick good	10	14
2	3:03	11	74	5:18	Texas	24-yard field goal by Wayne Clements	13	14
3	8:24	14	80	6:25	Texas	Winfred Tubbs 1-yard touchdown run, 2-point run good	21	14
3	13:24	9	36	3:53	Texas	42-yard field goal by Wayne Clements	24	14
3	0:14	12	80	4:50	Arkansas	Barry Foster 10-yard touchdown run, 2-point run failed	24	20
"TOP" = time of possession. For other American football terms, see Glossary of American football.							24	20

=== Baylor ===
Baylor Bears (4–6) at Texas Longhorns (5–4)

Quarter	1	2	3	4	Total
Baylor	10	7	26	7	50
Texas	0	0	0	7	7

at Texas Memorial Stadium, Austin, Texas

- Date: November 25, 1989
- Game time: 12:00 p.m.
- Game weather: Cloudy, 68 °F (20 °C)
- Game attendance: 49,081
- Referee: Joe Thomas
- TV: None
- Box Score

Team	Category	Player	Statistics
Baylor	Passing		
Baylor	Rushing		
Baylor	Receiving		
Texas	Passing	Donovan Forbes	7/11, 86 Yds, 2 INT
Texas	Rushing	Adrian Walker	26 Rush, 65 Yds, TD
Texas	Receiving	Kerry Cash	4 Rec, 56 Yds

Scoring summary

Quarter	Time	Drive			Team	Scoring information	Score	
Quarter	Time	Plays	Yards	TOP	Team	Scoring information	BU	UT
1	11:20				Baylor	50-yard field goal by Jeff Ireland	3	0
1	9:36				Baylor	Interception returned 20 yards for touchdown by Robert Blackmon, Jeff Ireland kick good	10	0
2	11:42				Baylor	Interception returned 35 yards for touchdown by Robert Blackmon, Jeff Ireland kick good	17	0
3	13:23				Baylor	Eldwin Raphel 6-yard touchdown run, Jeff Ireland kick no good	23	0
3	8:29				Baylor	David Mims 8-yard touchdown run, Jeff Ireland kick good	30	0
3	4:12				Baylor	24-yard field goal by Jeff Ireland	33	0
3	2:18				Baylor	47-yard field goal by Jeff Ireland	36	0
3	1:11				Baylor	Anthony Ray 2-yard touchdown run, Jeff Ireland kick good	43	0
4	13:06				Texas	Adrian Walker 1-yard touchdown run, Wayne Clements kick good	43	7
4	4:51				Baylor	Mike McKenzie 33-yard touchdown reception from Ricky Vestal, Jeff Ireland kick good	50	7
"TOP" = time of possession. For other American football terms, see Glossary of American football.							50	7

== Personnel ==
1989 Texas Longhorns football team roster
Players
Coaches
Offense

Pos.	#	Name	Class
OL	58	Jeff Boyd	Fr
RB		James Burleson
WR	11	Keith Cash	Jr
TE	19	Kerry Cash	Jr
RB	33	Deon Cockrell	Jr
OL		Ed Cunningham
WR	48	Darrick Duke	Fr
RB	34	Andre Eaddy	Fr
QB		Donovan Forbes
RB	7	Lemel Foreman	Fr
QB	10	Peter Gardere	Fr
WR		Curtis Govan
OL	79	Chuck Johnson	So
WR		Tony Jones
OL		Patrick McFarlin
OL	53	Duane Miller	Jr
QB	5	Mark Murdock	So
RB	23	Chris Samuels	Jr
RB		Bubba Smith
OL	50	Todd Smith	Jr
OL	51	Stan Thomas	Jr
TE		Thomas Thrift
RB	44	Winfred Tubbs	Fr
RB	36	Adrian Walker	Fr
WR	1	Johnny Walker	Jr
OL	70	Kevin Wiley	Jr
RB	39	Patrick Wilson	So

Defense

Pos.	#	Name	Class
DL		Rocky Allen
DB	9	Mark Berry	So
DB	21	Grady Cavness	Fr
LB	42	Anthony Curl	Fr
DL	81	Shane Dronett	Fr
LB		Duane Duncam
DB	17	Willie Mack Garza	Fr
DL	95	Oscar Giles	Jr
DB	16	Lance Gunn	Fr
DL		Ken Hackemack
LB	60	Brian Jones	Jr
DB	8	Van Malone	Fr
DL	92	James Patton	So
LB		Boone Powell
DB	18	Stanley Richard	Jr
DL		Mark Steed

Special teams

Pos.	#	Name	Class
K		Wayne Clements
P		Bobby Lilljedahl
P	80	Alex Waits	Jr

Head coach

- David McWilliams

Coordinators/assistant coaches

Legend

- (C) Team captain
- (S) Suspended
- (I) Ineligible
- Injured
- Redshirt
