= Alton Montgomery =

American football player (born 1968)

No. 22
- Positions: Cornerback, kick returner

Personal information
- Born: June 16, 1968 (age 58); Griffin, Georgia, U.S.
- Listed height: 6 ft 0 in (1.83 m)
- Listed weight: 198 lb (90 kg)

Career information
- High school: Griffin
- College: Northwest Mississippi CC; Houston
- NFL draft: 1990: 2nd round, 52nd overall pick

Career history
- Denver Broncos (1990–1992); Atlanta Falcons (1993–1995)

Awards and highlights
- First-team All-SWC (1989)

Career NFL statistics
- Interceptions: 3
- Sacks: 3
- Touchdowns: 1
- Stats at Pro Football Reference

Alton Montgomery (born June 16, 1968) is an American former professional football player who was a cornerback and kick returner in the National Football League (NFL). He was selected by the Denver Broncos in the second round of the 1990 NFL draft, where he played for three years. In 1993, he was signed by the Atlanta Falcons where he played until 1996.

== See also ==
- 1989 Houston Cougars football team
