= 1989 Texas Tech Red Raiders football team =

American college football season

1989 Texas Tech Red Raiders football

All-American Bowl champion

All-America Bowl, W 49–21 vs. Duke
- Conference: Southwest Conference

Ranking
- Coaches: No. 16
- AP: No. 19
- Record: 9–3 (5–3 SWC)
- Head coach: Spike Dykes (3rd season)
- Offensive coordinator: Dick Winder (3rd season)
- Offensive scheme: No-huddle spread
- Defensive coordinator: Carlos Mainord (3rd season)
- Base defense: 3–4
- Captain: Ronnie Gossett DT
- Home stadium: Jones Stadium

1989 Southwest Conference football standings
	Conf.					Overall
Team	W		L		T	W		L		T
No. 13 Arkansas $	7	–	1	–	0	10	–	2	–	0
No. 20 Texas A&M	6	–	2	–	0	8	–	4	–	0
No. 14 Houston	6	–	2	–	0	9	–	2	–	0
No. 19 Texas Tech	5	–	3	–	0	9	–	3	–	0
Baylor	4	–	4	–	0	5	–	6	–	0
Texas	4	–	4	–	0	5	–	6	–	0
TCU	2	–	6	–	0	4	–	7	–	0
Rice	2	–	6	–	0	2	–	8	–	1
SMU	0	–	8	–	0	2	–	9	–	0
$ – Conference champion; Rankings from AP Poll

The 1989 Texas Tech Red Raiders football team represented Texas Tech University as a member of the Southwest Conference (SWC) during the 1989 NCAA Division I-A football season. In their third season under head coach Spike Dykes, the Red Raiders compiled a 9–3 record (5–3 against SWC opponents), finished in fourth place in the conference, outscored opponents by a combined total of 360 to 281, defeated Duke in the 1989 All-American Bowl, and were ranked No. 19 in the final AP Poll. The team played its home games at Clifford B. and Audrey Jones Stadium in Lubbock, Texas.

== Schedule ==
Date	Time	Opponent	Rank	Site	TV	Result	Attendance	Source
September 9	7:00 pm	No. 20 Arizona*		Jones Stadium; Lubbock, TX		W 24–14	35,940	
September 16	12:00 pm	New Mexico*		Jones Stadium; Lubbock, TX	Raycom	W 27–20	27,535	
September 23	6:30 pm	at Oklahoma State*		Lewis Field; Stillwater, OK		W 31–15	40,200	
September 30	12:00 pm	at Baylor		Floyd Casey Stadium; Waco, TX (rivalry)	Raycom	L 15–29	38,785	
October 7	12:00 pm	No. 19 Texas A&M		Jones Stadium; Lubbock, TX (rivalry)	Raycom	W 27–24	50,743	
October 14	7:00 pm	No. 7 Arkansas^{†}		Jones Stadium; Lubbock, TX (rivalry)		L 13–45	47,520	
October 21	1:00 pm	Rice		Jones Stadium; Lubbock, TX		W 41–25	26,902	
November 4	1:00 pm	at No. 22 Texas		Texas Memorial Stadium; Austin, TX (rivalry)		W 24–17	81,826	
November 11	12:00 pm	TCU	No. 23	Jones Stadium; Lubbock, TX (rivalry)	Raycom	W 37–7	39,255	
November 18	2:00 pm	at SMU	No. 20	Ownby Stadium; University Park, TX		W 48–24	21,865	
November 25	4:00 pm	at No. 13 Houston	No. 18	Houston Astrodome; Houston, TX (rivalry)		L 24–40	30,097	
December 28	7:00 pm	vs. No. 20 Duke*	No. 24	Legion Field; Birmingham, AL (All-American Bowl)	ESPN	W 49–21	47,750	
*Non-conference game; ^{†}Homecoming; Rankings from AP Poll released prior to the game; All times are in Central time

== Game summaries ==
=== Vs. No. 20 Duke (All-American Bowl) ===
No. 20 Duke Blue Devils vs. No. 24 Texas Tech Red Raiders (All-American Bowl) – Game summary

Quarter	1	2	3	4	Total
No. 20 Blue Devils	0	14	0	7	21
No. 24 Red Raiders	14	14	14	7	49

at Legion Field, Birmingham, Alabama

- Date: December 28
- Game time: 7:00 p.m. CST
- Game attendance: 47,750
- Referee: Dick Burleson
- TV announcers (ESPN): Wayne Larrivee, Ben Bennett, and Chris Fowler

== Rankings ==
Ranking movements Legend: ██ Increase in ranking ██ Decrease in ranking — = Not ranked RV = Received votes т = Tied with team above or below
	Week																
Poll	Pre	1	2	3	4	5	6	7	8	9	10	11	12	13	14	15	Final
AP	—	—	RV	RV	RV	RV	RV	—	RV	RV	23	20	18	25	25	24	19
Coaches	—	—	RV	RV	RV	RV	RV	—	RV	RV	20 T	19	17	RV	20 T	20 T	16 T
