= Joey Banes =

American football player (born 1967)

No. 65, 71
- Position: Offensive tackle

Personal information
- Born: April 7, 1967 (age 59); Houston, Texas, U.S.
- Listed height: 6 ft 7 in (2.01 m)
- Listed weight: 282 lb (128 kg)

Career information
- High school: Klein (Klein, Texas)
- College: Houston (1986–1989)
- NFL draft: 1990: 11th round, 295th overall pick

Career history
- Houston Oilers (1990)*; Indianapolis Colts (1990); Houston Oilers (1991)*; New York/New Jersey Knights (1992)
- * Offseason or practice squad member only

Awards and highlights
- First-team All-SWC (1989)

Career NFL statistics
- Games played: 1
- Stats at Pro Football Reference

Bobby Joe Banes Jr. (born April 7, 1967) is an American former professional football player who was an offensive tackle for one season with the Indianapolis Colts of the National Football League (NFL). He was selected by the Houston Oilers in the eleventh round of the 1990 NFL draft after playing college football for the Houston Cougars.

== Early life and college ==
Bobby Joe Banes Jr. was born on April 7, 1967, in Houston, Texas. He attended Klein High School in Klein, Texas.

Banes was a four-year letterman for the Houston Cougars of the University of Houston from 1986 to 1989. He earned Associated Press first-team All-Southwest Conference honors during the 1989 season.

== Professional career ==
Banes was selected by the Houston Oilers in the 11th round, with the 295th overall pick, of the 1990 NFL draft. He officially signed with the team on July 20. He was released on September 2 and signed to the team's practice squad on October 3, 1990.

On November 8, 1990, Banes was signed to the Indianapolis Colts' active roster off of the Oilers practice squad. He played in one game for the Colts before being released on November 27, 1990.

Banes signed with the Oilers again on May 10, 1991, but was later released on August 26, 1991.

Banes was a member of the New York/New Jersey Knights of the World League of American Football during the 1992 season.
