= Elbert Crawford =

American football player (1966–2013)

No. 65
- Positions: Guard, center

Personal information
- Born: June 20, 1966; Chicago, Illinois, U.S.
- Died: May 2, 2013 (aged 46); Little Rock, Arkansas, U.S.
- Listed height: 6 ft 3 in (1.91 m)
- Listed weight: 280 lb (127 kg)

Career information
- High school: Little Rock (AR) Hall
- College: Arkansas (1986–1989)
- NFL draft: 1990: 8th round, 216th overall pick

Career history
- Los Angeles Rams (1990)*; New England Patriots (1990–1991); Denver Broncos (1992)
- * Offseason or practice squad member only

Awards and highlights
- First-team All-SWC (1989); Second-team All-SWC (1988)

Career NFL statistics
- Games played: 30
- Games started: 16
- Stats at Pro Football Reference

Elbert Crawford (June 20, 1966 – May 2, 2013) was an American professional football offensive lineman who played two seasons with the New England Patriots of the National Football League (NFL). He was selected by the Los Angeles Rams in the eighth round of the 1990 NFL draft after playing college football at Arkansas. He was also a member of the Denver Broncos.

== Early life and college ==
Elbert Crawford was born on June 20, 1966, in Chicago, Illinois. He attended Hall High School in Little Rock, Arkansas.

He lettered for the Arkansas Razorbacks from 1986 to 1989. He earned Associated Press (AP) second-team All-Southwest Conference (SWC) honors in 1988 and AP first-team All-SWC honors in 1989.

== Professional career ==
Crawford was selected by the Los Angeles Rams in the eighth round, with the 216th overall pick, of the 1990 NFL draft. He officially signed with the team on July 11. He was released by the Rams on September 3, 1990.

Crawford signed with the New England Patriots on September 12, 1990, and played in 14 games for the team during the 1990 season. He started all 16 games for the Patriots in 1991 at offensive guard. He became a free agent after the 1991 season.

Crawford was signed by the Denver Broncos on March 20, 1992. He had a heart attack in April 1992 while working out, and was placed on the non-football injury list on July 20, 1992. He became a free agent after the 1992 season.

== Death ==
Crawford died of an apparent heart attack on May 2, 2013, in Little Rock, Arkansas.
