= Alfred Oglesby =

American football player (1967–2009)

No. 96, 98, 95
- Position: Defensive end

Personal information
- Born: January 27, 1967; Weimar, Texas, U.S.
- Died: September 26, 2009 (aged 42); Houston, Texas, U.S.
- Listed height: 6 ft 4 in (1.93 m)
- Listed weight: 290 lb (132 kg)

Career information
- High school: Weimar (Weimar, Texas)
- College: Houston
- NFL draft: 1990: 3rd round, 66th overall pick

Career history
- Miami Dolphins (1990–1992); Green Bay Packers (1992); New York Jets (1993); (1994–1995); Cincinnati Bengals (1995)

Awards and highlights
- Second-team All-SWC (1988); First Team All-SWC (1989)

Career NFL statistics
- Tackles: 104
- Sacks: 4
- Forced fumbles: 2
- Stats at Pro Football Reference

Alfred Lee Oglesby (January 27, 1967 – September 26, 2009) was an American professional football defensive end and defensive tackle in the National Football League (NFL). After playing college football for the University of Houston, he was selected by the Miami Dolphins in the third round of the 1990 NFL draft. He also played for the Green Bay Packers, New York Jets, and Cincinnati Bengals. Oglesby died in September 2009.
