= 1989 TCU Horned Frogs football team =

American college football season

1989 TCU Horned Frogs football
- Conference: Southwest Conference
- Record: 4–7 (2–6 SWC)
- Head coach: Jim Wacker (7th season)
- Home stadium: Amon G. Carter Stadium

1989 Southwest Conference football standings
	Conf.					Overall
Team	W		L		T	W		L		T
No. 13 Arkansas $	7	–	1	–	0	10	–	2	–	0
No. 20 Texas A&M	6	–	2	–	0	8	–	4	–	0
No. 14 Houston	6	–	2	–	0	9	–	2	–	0
No. 19 Texas Tech	5	–	3	–	0	9	–	3	–	0
Baylor	4	–	4	–	0	5	–	6	–	0
Texas	4	–	4	–	0	5	–	6	–	0
TCU	2	–	6	–	0	4	–	7	–	0
Rice	2	–	6	–	0	2	–	8	–	1
SMU	0	–	8	–	0	2	–	9	–	0
$ – Conference champion; Rankings from AP Poll

The 1989 TCU Horned Frogs football team represented Texas Christian University (TCU) in the 1989 NCAA Division I-A football season . The Horned Frogs finished the season 4–7 overall and 2–6 in Southwest Conference. The team was coached by Jim Wacker, in his seventh year as head coach. The Frogs played their home games in Amon G. Carter Stadium, which is located on campus in Fort Worth, Texas.

== Schedule ==
Date	Time	Opponent	Site	TV	Result	Attendance	Source
September 9		at Missouri*	Faurot Field; Columbia, MO		L 10–14	39,449	
September 16		No. 22 Texas A&M	Amon G. Carter Stadium; Fort Worth, TX (rivalry)		L 7–44	42,960	
September 23		Southern Miss*	Amon G. Carter Stadium; Fort Worth, TX		W 19–17	15,839	
September 30		SMU	Amon G. Carter Stadium; Fort Worth, TX (rivalry)		W 28–10	26,023	
October 7		No. 7 Arkansas	Amon G. Carter Stadium; Fort Worth, TX		L 19–41	25,734	
October 14		at Rice	Rice Stadium; Houston, TX		W 30–16	12,100	
October 21		No. 19 Air Force*	Amon G. Carter Stadium; Fort Worth, TX		W 27–9	23,593	
October 28		at Baylor	Floyd Casey Stadium; Waco, TX (rivalry)		L 9–27	35,713	
November 4		No. 17 Houston	Amon G. Carter Stadium; Fort Worth, TX		L 10–55	19,212	
November 11	12:00 p.m.	at No. 23 Texas Tech	Jones Stadium; Lubbock, TX (rivalry)	Raycom	L 7–37	39,255	
November 18	12:00 p.m.	at Texas	Texas Memorial Stadium; Austin, TX (rivalry)	Raycom	L 17–31	50,882	
*Non-conference game; Rankings from AP Poll released prior to the game; All times are in Central time

== Roster ==
1989 TCU Horned Frogs football team roster
Players			Coaches
Offense: Pos. / # / Name / Class; TE / 89 / Kelly Blackwell / So	Defense: Pos. / # / Name / Class; DT / 47 / Fred Washington / Sr	Special teams: Pos. / # / Name / Class	Head coach: Jim Wacker; Coordinators/assistant coaches Legend: (C) Team captain; (S) Suspended; (I) Ineligible; Injured; Redshirt
