= 1987 Astro-Bluebonnet Bowl =

Pittsburgh Panthers	Texas Longhorns
(8–3)	(6–5)
27	32
Head coach: Mike Gottfried	Head coach: David McWilliams
AP / Coaches; 19 / 18
	1	2	3	4	Total
Pittsburgh	7	0	7	13	27
Texas	14	3	3	12	32
- Date: December 31, 1987
- Season: 1987
- Stadium: Astrodome
- Location: Houston, Texas
- MVP: Tony Jones Offensive
- Referee: Jimmy Harper (SEC)
- Attendance: 33,122

United States TV coverage
- Network: Mizlou Television Network
- Announcers: Steve Grad and Ed Biles

The 1987 Astro-Bluebonnet Bowl was a college football postseason bowl game between the Texas Longhorns and the Pittsburgh Panthers. The game was played in the Astrodome in Houston, Texas on December 31, 1987, and was the twenty-ninth edition of the bowl which had been played in Houston since 1959. Texas won the game 32-27.

This edition of the Bluebonnet Bowl, which added "Astro" to its title every year it was played in the Astrodome, proved to be its last.

== Background ==
The Longhorns finished tied for second in the Southwest Conference with Arkansas, who played in the Liberty Bowl that year. This was Texas' sixth Bluebonnet Bowl. Pittsburgh was an Independent in their first bowl game since 1984. This was Pittsburgh's only Bluebonnet Bowl.

== Game summary ==
Bret Stafford connected with Tony Jones for a 77-yard touchdown on the first play from scrimmage to give the Longhorns a 7-0 lead. Pittsburgh started off their retaliation well, when Billy Owens returned the kickoff 45 yards. Billy Osborn then Reggie Williams for 45 yards, and lastly Craig Heyward tied the score with a four-yard run. But six plays later, the Longhorns took the lead again with a Stafford pass to Tony Jones on a short pass that evolved into a 60-yard touchdown to make it 14-7. The Longhorns added a field goal to make it 17-7 at halftime. Texas was outscored 20-15 in the second half after three touchdowns by Wanke, the Pittsburgh quarterback, with two late in the fourth quarter that cut the Longhorns’ lead to five, though they could not score after that as the Longhorns won the final Bluebonnet Bowl. Brett Stafford finished with 364 yards, including 202 in the first quarter, setting the record for most passing yards in a Bluebonnet Bowl. Jones set records for receiving yards and longest reception.

== Aftermath ==
Bluebonnet Bowl organizers had intended to keep the game going and scheduled the 1988 game for December 31. However, on October 13 of that year, the officials for the bowl announced that the 1988 game would not be played. Citing low funding and a lack of a corporate sponsor (by 1988, most of the yearly bowls were carrying some form of sponsorship), the initial idea was to take the 1988 season off and return in 1989. This, however, never would materialize and the 1987 game would stand as the last.
