= 1989 Baylor Bears football team =

American college football season

1989 Baylor Bears football
- Conference: Southwest Conference
- Record: 5–6 (4–4 SWC)
- Head coach: Grant Teaff (18th season)
- Offensive coordinator: F.A. Dry (6th season)
- Offensive scheme: I formation
- Defensive coordinator: Pete Fredenburg (7th season)
- Base defense: 4–4
- Home stadium: Floyd Casey Stadium

1989 Southwest Conference football standings
	Conf.					Overall
Team	W		L		T	W		L		T
No. 13 Arkansas $	7	–	1	–	0	10	–	2	–	0
No. 20 Texas A&M	6	–	2	–	0	8	–	4	–	0
No. 14 Houston	6	–	2	–	0	9	–	2	–	0
No. 19 Texas Tech	5	–	3	–	0	9	–	3	–	0
Baylor	4	–	4	–	0	5	–	6	–	0
Texas	4	–	4	–	0	5	–	6	–	0
TCU	2	–	6	–	0	4	–	7	–	0
Rice	2	–	6	–	0	2	–	8	–	1
SMU	0	–	8	–	0	2	–	9	–	0
$ – Conference champion; Rankings from AP Poll

The 1989 Baylor Bears football team represented Baylor University as a member of the Southwest Conference (SWC) during the 1989 NCAA Division I-A football season. Led by 18th-year head coach Grant Teaff, the Bears compiled an overall record of 5–6 with a mark of 4–4 in conference play, tying for fifth place in the SWC. The team played home games at Floyd Casey Stadium in Waco, Texas.

In the season finale, Baylor defeated Texas by the score of 50 to 7 It was Baylor's seventh victory in Austin and the first there since 1951.

== Schedule ==
Date	Opponent	Site	TV	Result	Attendance	Source
September 9	at No. 8 Oklahoma*	Oklahoma Memorial Stadium; Norman, OK		L 7–33	74,600	
September 16	at Georgia*	Sanford Stadium; Athens, GA	WTBS	L 3–15	82,007	
September 23	Kansas*	Floyd Casey Stadium; Waco, TX		W 46–3	26,765	
September 30	Texas Tech	Floyd Casey Stadium; Waco, TX (rivalry)	Raycom	W 29–15	38,785	
October 7	at No. 12 Houston	Houston Astrodome; Houston, TX (rivalry)		L 10–66	31,433	
October 14	at SMU	Ownby Stadium; University Park, TX	Raycom	W 49–3	21,434	
October 21	No. 23 Texas A&M	Floyd Casey Stadium; Waco, TX (Battle of the Brazos)		L 11–14	45,565	
October 28	TCU^{†}	Floyd Casey Stadium; Waco, TX (rivalry)	Raycom	W 27–9	35,713	
November 11	at No. 10 Arkansas	Razorback Stadium; Fayetteville, AR	ESPN	L 10–19	51,352	
November 18	Rice	Floyd Casey Stadium; Waco, TX		L 3–6	22,133	
November 25	at Texas	Texas Memorial Stadium; Austin, TX (rivalry)		W 50–7	49,081	
*Non-conference game; ^{†}Homecoming; Rankings from AP Poll released prior to the game

== Game summaries ==
=== At Texas ===
Baylor Bears (4–6) at Texas Longhorns (5–4)

Quarter	1	2	3	4	Total
Baylor	10	7	26	7	50
Texas	0	0	0	7	7

at Texas Memorial Stadium, Austin, Texas

- Date: November 25, 1989
- Game time: 12:00 p.m.
- Game weather: Cloudy, 68 °F (20 °C)
- Game attendance: 49,081
- Referee: Joe Thomas
- TV: None
- Box Score

Team	Category	Player	Statistics
Baylor	Passing		
Baylor	Rushing		
Baylor	Receiving		
Texas	Passing	Donovan Forbes	7/11, 86 Yds, 2 INT
Texas	Rushing	Adrian Walker	26 Rush, 65 Yds, TD
Texas	Receiving	Kerry Cash	4 Rec, 56 Yds

Scoring summary

Quarter	Time	Drive			Team	Scoring information	Score	
Quarter	Time	Plays	Yards	TOP	Team	Scoring information	BU	UT
1	11:20				Baylor	50-yard field goal by Jeff Ireland	3	0
1	9:36				Baylor	Interception returned 20 yards for touchdown by Robert Blackmon, Jeff Ireland kick good	10	0
2	11:42				Baylor	Interception returned 35 yards for touchdown by Robert Blackmon, Jeff Ireland kick good	17	0
3	13:23				Baylor	Eldwin Raphel 6-yard touchdown run, Jeff Ireland kick no good	23	0
3	8:29				Baylor	David Mims 8-yard touchdown run, Jeff Ireland kick good	30	0
3	4:12				Baylor	24-yard field goal by Jeff Ireland	33	0
3	2:18				Baylor	47-yard field goal by Jeff Ireland	36	0
3	1:11				Baylor	Anthony Ray 2-yard touchdown run, Jeff Ireland kick good	43	0
4	13:06				Texas	Adrian Walker 1-yard touchdown run, Wayne Clements kick good	43	7
4	4:51				Baylor	Mike McKenzie 33-yard touchdown reception from Ricky Vestal, Jeff Ireland kick good	50	7
"TOP" = time of possession. For other American football terms, see Glossary of American football.							50	7

== Roster ==
1989 Baylor Bears football team roster
Players
Coaches
Offense

Pos.	#	Name	Class
TE		Mike McKenzie
RB		David Mims
RB		Eldwin Raphel
RB		Anthony Ray
QB		Ricky Vestal

Defense

Pos.	#	Name	Class
S		Robert Blackmon

Special teams

Pos.	#	Name	Class
K		Jeff Ireland

Head coach

- Grant Teaff

Coordinators/assistant coaches

Legend

- (C) Team captain
- (S) Suspended
- (I) Ineligible
- Injured
- Redshirt

== Team players drafted into the NFL ==
The following players were drafted into professional football following the season.

Player	Position	Round	Pick	Franchise
James Francis	Linebacker	1	12	Cincinnati Bengals
Robert Blackmon	Defensive back	2	34	Seattle Seahawks
