= Craig Veasey =

American football player (born 1966)

No. 91, 94, 71
- Positions: Defensive tackle, nose tackle

Personal information
- Born: December 25, 1966 (age 59); Houston, Texas, U.S.
- Listed height: 6 ft 2 in (1.88 m)
- Listed weight: 285 lb (129 kg)

Career information
- High school: Clear Lake (TX)
- College: Houston
- NFL draft: 1990: 3rd round, 81st overall pick

Career history
- Pittsburgh Steelers (1990–1991); Houston Oilers (1992); New England Patriots (1992); Miami Dolphins (1993)*; Houston Oilers (1993); Miami Dolphins (1993–1994); Houston Oilers (1995)
- * Offseason or practice squad member only

Awards and highlights
- First Team All-SWC (1989)

Career NFL statistics
- Fumble recoveries: 1
- Sacks: 6.5
- Interceptions: 1
- Stats at Pro Football Reference

Craig Veasey (born December 25, 1966) is an American former professional football player who was a defensive tackle and nose tackle in the National Football League (NFL). While attending the University of Houston from 1985 to 1989, Craig earned was a four-year letterman, and a starter for three of those years. In 1989 as a senior at the University of Houston, he earned the honor of USA Today All-American from the defensive end position for his 17 sacks and 93 tackles. After being selected with the 81st pick in the 1990 NFL draft, he played for the Pittsburgh Steelers under Chuck Noll, the Miami Dolphins under Don Shula, and under the Houston Oilers for coaches Jack Pardee and Jeff Fisher. He retired from the Oilers after the 1996 season.
