= 1989 Texas A&M Aggies football team =

American college football season

1989 Texas A&M Aggies football

John Hancock Bowl, L 28–31 vs. Pittsburgh
- Conference: Southwest Conference

Ranking
- AP: No. 20
- Record: 8–4 (6–2 SWC)
- Head coach: R. C. Slocum (1st season)
- Offensive coordinator: Bob Toledo (1st season)
- Offensive scheme: West Coast
- Defensive coordinator: Bob Davie (1st season)
- Base defense: 3–4
- Home stadium: Kyle Field

1989 Southwest Conference football standings
	Conf.					Overall
Team	W		L		T	W		L		T
No. 13 Arkansas $	7	–	1	–	0	10	–	2	–	0
No. 20 Texas A&M	6	–	2	–	0	8	–	4	–	0
No. 14 Houston	6	–	2	–	0	9	–	2	–	0
No. 19 Texas Tech	5	–	3	–	0	9	–	3	–	0
Baylor	4	–	4	–	0	5	–	6	–	0
Texas	4	–	4	–	0	5	–	6	–	0
TCU	2	–	6	–	0	4	–	7	–	0
Rice	2	–	6	–	0	2	–	8	–	1
SMU	0	–	8	–	0	2	–	9	–	0
$ – Conference champion; Rankings from AP Poll

The 1989 Texas A&M Aggies football team represented Texas A&M University as a member of the Southwest Conference (SWC) during the 1989 NCAA Division I-A football season. Led by first-year head coach R. C. Slocum, the Aggies compiled an overall record of 8–4 with a mark of 6–2 in conference play, tying for second place in the SWC. Texas A&M was invited to the John Hancock Bowl, where the Aggies lost to Pittsburgh. The team played home games at Kyle Field in College Station, Texas.

== Schedule ==
Date	Opponent	Rank	Site	TV	Result	Attendance	Source
September 2	No. 7 LSU*		Kyle Field; College Station, TX	ESPN	W 28–16	61,733	
September 9	at Washington*	No. 15	Husky Stadium; Seattle, WA	ABC	L 6–19	69,434	
September 16	at TCU	No. 22	Amon G. Carter Stadium; Fort Worth, TX (rivalry)		W 44–7	42,960	
September 30	Southern Miss*	No. 22	Kyle Field; College Station, TX		W 31–14	58,843	
October 7	at Texas Tech	No. 19	Jones Stadium; Lubbock, TX (rivalry)	Raycom	L 24–27	50,743	
October 14	No. 8 Houston		Kyle Field; College Station, TX		W 17–13	66,423	
October 21	at Baylor	No. 23	Floyd Casey Stadium; Waco, TX (Battle of the Brazos)		W 14–11	45,565	
October 28	at Rice	No. 21	Rice Stadium; Houston, TX		W 45–7	30,900	
November 4	SMU	No. 20	Kyle Field; College Station, TX		W 63–14	48,948	
November 24	No. 9 Arkansas	No. 14	Kyle Field; College Station, TX (rivalry)	CBS	L 22–23	57,876	
December 2	Texas	No. 16	Kyle Field; College Station, TX (rivalry)	ESPN	W 21–10	76,803	
December 30	vs. No. 24 Pittsburgh*	No. 16	Sun Bowl; El Paso, TX (John Hancock Bowl)	CBS	L 28–31	44,887	
*Non-conference game; Rankings from AP Poll released prior to the game
