= Tony Jones (wide receiver) =

American football player (born 1965)

No. 82, 83, 4
- Position: Wide receiver

Personal information
- Born: December 30, 1965 (age 60); Grapeland, Texas, U.S.
- Listed height: 5 ft 7 in (1.70 m)
- Listed weight: 142 lb (64 kg)

Career information
- High school: Grapeland
- College: Texas
- NFL draft: 1990: 6th round, 153rd overall pick

Career history
- Houston Oilers (1990–1991); Atlanta Falcons (1992); Houston Oilers (1993); Atlanta Falcons (1994)*; Sacramento Gold Miners (1994); Frankfurt Galaxy (1995); Arizona Cardinals (1996)*; Amsterdam Admirals (1996)
- * Offseason or practice squad member only

Awards and highlights
- All-American Track and Field - 1987, 1988 - 400m Relay; 1987 Astro-Bluebonnet Bowl Offensive MVP; First-team All-SWC (1988); Second-team All-SWC (1987); 1987 Astro-Bluebonnet Bowl Champion

Career NFL statistics
- Receptions: 63
- Receiving yards: 798
- Touchdowns: 9
- Stats at Pro Football Reference

Anthony Bernard Jones (born December 30, 1965) is an American former professional football player who was a wide receiver for five seasons in the National Football League (NFL) with the Houston Oilers, Atlanta Falcons and Arizona Cardinals; one season in the Canadian Football League with the Sacramento Gold Miners and two season in the World League of American Football with the Frankfurt Galaxy and the Amsterdam Admirals. He played college football for the Texas Longhorns, earning all-conference honors in the Southwest Conference and the 1988 Astro-Bluebonnet Bowl Offensive MVP.

Jones attended Grapeland High School, where he was a member of the 2A state champion basketball team in 1985.

He went on to attend the University of Texas at Austin, where played football and ran track. In Football he was a 3x letterman, a 2x All-Conference Wide Receiver and a team captain. He set several school records including career receiving yards, most receiving yards in a game by a sophomore (still current), most receiving yards in a game, and most receiving yards and TD receptions in a bowl game. In track, he was an All-American. At the 1987 Southwest Conference championships, Jones ran the 200 m in 20.28 seconds, a record that stood at the University of Texas for 32 years until it was broken in 2019 by Micaiah Harris, who ran a 20.21.

After college he played in the 1990 East-West Shrine game.

Pre-draft measurables
Height	Weight	Arm length	Hand span
5 ft 6 in (1.68 m)	142 lb (64 kg)	28 1/2 in (0.72 m)	8 in (0.20 m)

Drafted by the Houston Oilers in the sixth round of the 1990 NFL draft, Jones was one of the smallest players in the league, weighing as little as 139 lb (63 kg) during his professional career. He was signed by the Oilers in 1990 and played for them for 2 seasons, racking up 660 receiving yards, before becoming a free agent. He was then signed by the Atlanta Falcons before the 1992 season, but only played in 10 games due to multiple injuries. He returned to the Oilers in 1993 and was cut at the end of camp, but then re-signed in the middle of the season and played 2 more games for them. He again became a free agent and was again signed by the Falcons in 1994, but cut by them before the camp started.

After being release by the Falcons in 1994, Jones signed with the Sacramento Gold Miners of the CFL and played both receiver and returner.

In 1995, he moved to the WLAF where he played for the Frankfurt Galaxy and helped them to World Bowl '95, which they lost. In March of 1996 he was placed on the injured reserve by Frankfurt and in June 1996 he was signed by the Amsterdam Admirals as a late season replacement, but only caught three passes. During the 1996 WLAF season he was signed by the Arizona Cardinals who then released him during camp.
