= Chuck Weatherspoon =

American football player (born 1968)

No. 37
- Position: Running back

Personal information
- Born: July 31, 1968 (age 58); Hinesville, Georgia, U.S.
- Listed height: 5 ft 9 in (1.75 m)
- Listed weight: 229 lb (104 kg)

Career information
- High school: La Habra (La Habra, California)
- College: Houston
- NFL draft: 1991: 9th round, 242nd overall pick

Career history
- Philadelphia Eagles (1991)*; Tampa Bay Buccaneers (1991); Detroit Lions (1991)*; Dallas Cowboys (1992)*; Fort Worth Cavalry (1994)
- * Offseason or practice squad member only

Awards and highlights
- First-team All-SWC (1989); Second-team All-SWC (1988)
- Stats at Pro Football Reference
- Stats at ArenaFan.com

Johnny "Chuck" Weatherspoon, Jr. (born July 31, 1968) is an American former professional football running back who played one season with the Tampa Bay Buccaneers of the National Football League (NFL). He was selected by the Philadelphia Eagles in the ninth round of the 1991 NFL draft. Weatherspoon played college football at the University of Houston. He was also a member of the Fort Worth Cavalry of the Arena Football League (AFL).

== Early life ==
Weatherspoon attended La Habra High School in La Habra, California.

== College career ==
Weatherspoon played for the Houston Cougars of the University of Houston from 1987 to 1990. He recorded career totals of 3,247 yards and 27 touchdowns on 395 rushing attempts. He also accumulated 1,375 yards and eight touchdowns on 117 receptions. Weatherspoon led NCAA Division I-A in rushing yards per attempt in 1988 with an 8.5 average and again led Division I-A with a 9.6 average in 1989. His career average of 8.2 yards per carry is tied with Darrell Henderson of Memphis as the best in college football history.

== Professional career ==
Weatherspoon was selected by the Philadelphia Eagles of the NFL in the ninth round with the 242nd pick in the 1991 NFL draft. He was subsequently signed as a free agent by the Tampa Bay Buccaneers and played in four games for the team during the 1991 season. He played for the Fort Worth Cavalry of the AFL in 1994.

== See also ==
- List of college football yearly rushing leaders
