= 1990 UCLA Bruins football team =

American college football season

1990 UCLA Bruins football
- Conference: Pacific-10 Conference
- Record: 5–6 (4–4 Pac-10)
- Head coach: Terry Donahue (15th season)
- Offensive coordinator: Homer Smith (10th season)
- Defensive coordinator: Bob Field (9th season)
- Home stadium: Rose Bowl

1990 Pacific-10 Conference football standings
	Conf.					Overall
Team	W		L		T	W		L		T
No. 5 Washington $	7	–	1	–	0	10	–	2	–	0
No. 20 USC	5	–	2	–	1	8	–	4	–	1
Oregon	4	–	3	–	0	8	–	4	–	0
California	4	–	3	–	1	7	–	4	–	1
Arizona	5	–	4	–	0	7	–	5	–	0
UCLA	4	–	4	–	0	5	–	6	–	0
Stanford	4	–	4	–	0	5	–	6	–	0
Arizona State	2	–	5	–	0	4	–	7	–	0
Washington State	2	–	6	–	0	3	–	8	–	0
Oregon State	1	–	6	–	0	1	–	10	–	0
$ – Conference champion; Rankings from AP Poll

The 1990 UCLA Bruins football team represented University of California, Los Angeles (UCLA) as a member Pacific-10 Conference (Pac-10) during the 1990 NCAA Division I-A football season. Led by 15th-year head coach Terry Donahue the Bruins compiled an overall record of 5–6 with a mark of 4–4 in conference play, tying for sixth place in the Pac-10. UCLA played home games at the Rose Bowl in Pasadena, California.

UCLA finished with a losing record in consecutive seasons for the first time since 1963 and 1964.

== Schedule ==
Date	Time	Opponent	Rank	Site	TV	Result	Attendance	Source
September 8	12:30 pm	No. 23 Oklahoma*	No. 19	Rose Bowl; Pasadena, CA	ABC	L 14–34	50,068	
September 15	3:30 pm	Stanford		Rose Bowl; Pasadena, CA (rivalry)	PSN	W 32–31	45,855	
September 22	9:00 am	at No. 7 Michigan*		Michigan Stadium; Ann Arbor, MI	ABC	L 15–38	104,992	
September 29	8:00 pm	at Washington State		Martin Stadium; Pullman, WA	ESPN	W 30–20	34,190	
October 6	12:30 pm	No. 25 Arizona		Rose Bowl; Pasadena, CA	ABC	L 21–28	50,156	
October 13	7:00 pm	San Diego State*		Rose Bowl; Pasadena, CA	PSN	W 45–31	41,025	
October 20	1:00 pm	at California		California Memorial Stadium; Berkeley, CA (rivalry)		L 31–38	50,000	
October 27	3:30 pm	Oregon State		Rose Bowl; Pasadena, CA	PSN	W 26–17	42,427	
November 3	1:00 pm	at No. 22 Oregon		Autzen Stadium; Eugene, OR		L 24–28	45,901	
November 10	12:30 pm	at No. 2 Washington		Husky Stadium; Seattle, WA	ABC	W 25–22	71,925	
November 17	12:30 pm	No. 19 USC		Rose Bowl; Pasadena, CA (Victory Bell)	ABC	L 42–45	98,088	
*Non-conference game; Rankings from AP Poll released prior to the game; All times are in Pacific time; Source:

== Game summaries ==
=== USC ===
#19 USC Trojans (7–2–1) at UCLA Bruins (5–5)

Quarter	1	2	3	4	Total
USC	14	7	3	21	45
UCLA	7	7	7	21	42

at Rose Bowl, Pasadena, California

- Date: November 17
- Game weather: Sunny
- Game attendance: 98,088
- TV: ABC

Game information

First quarter

- USC – Stephon Pace 27-yard interception return (pass failed). USC 6–0.
- UCLA – Tommy Maddox 9-yard run (Brad Daluiso kick). UCLA 7–6.
- USC – Mazio Royster 7-yard run (pass good). USC 14–7.

Second quarter

- UCLA – Sean LaChapelle 47-yard pass from Tommy Maddox (Brad Daluiso kick). Tie 14–14.
- USC – Todd Marinovich 1-yard run (Quin Rodriguez kick). USC 21–14.

Third quarter

- USC – Quin Rodriguez 20-yard field goal, 4:19. USC 24–14. Drive: 19 plays, 68 yards.
- UCLA – Brian Brown 5-yard run (Brad Daluiso kick). USC 24–21.

Fourth quarter

- USC – Jason Oliver 34-yard interception return (Quin Rodriguez kick), 12:02. USC 31–21.
- UCLA – Scott Miller 29-yard pass from Tommy Maddox (Brad Daluiso kick), 10:46. USC 31–28.
- UCLA – Scott Miller 38-yard pass from Tommy Maddox (Brad Daluiso kick), 9:17. UCLA 35–31.
- USC – Johnnie Morton 21-yard pass from Todd Marinovich (Quin Rodriguez kick), 3:09. USC 38–35. Drive: 8 plays, 47 yards.
- UCLA – Kevin Smith 1-yard run (Brad Daluiso kick), 1:19. UCLA 42–38. Drive: 7 plays, 75 yards.
- USC – Johnnie Morton 23-yard pass from Todd Marinovich (Quin Rodriguez kick), 0:16. USC 45–42. Drive: 5 plays, 75 yards.

Top passers

- USC – Todd Marinovich – 16/25, 215 yards, 2 TD, INT
- UCLA – Tommy Maddox – 26/40, 409 yards, 3 TD, 3 INT

Top rushers

- USC – Mazio Royster – 31 rushes, 157 yards, TD
- UCLA – Tommy Maddox – 9 rushes, 36 yards, TD

Top receivers

- USC – Gary Wellman – 7 receptions, 99 yards
- UCLA – Scott Miller – 8 receptions, 175 yards, 2 TD

- 60th meeting
- Maddox 409 yards passing, Miller 175 yards receiving (single game school records)

== Roster ==
1990 UCLA Bruins football team roster
Players
Coaches
Offense

Pos.	#	Name	Class
WR		Bryan Adams
TE		Corwin Anthony
TE		Randy Austin
QB		Jim Bonds
RB		Brian Brown
RB		Kaleaph Carter
QB		Wayne Cook	Fr
TE		Rick Daly
QB		Bert Emanuel
OL		Rick Fuller
OL		Aaron Gideon
WR		Sean LaChapelle
QB	8	Tommy Maddox
WR	2	Scott Miller
WR		Michael Moore
WR		Reggie Moore
OL		Craig Novitsky
WR		Paul Richardson
RB		Kevin Smith
OL		Scott Spalding
OL		Derek Stevens
RB		Maury Toy
RB		Shawn Willis
OL		Lance Zeno

Defense

Pos.	#	Name	Class
LB		Arnold Ale
LB		Stacy Argo
DL		Mike Chalenski
DB		Travis Collier
DB		Matt Darby
DB		Carlton Gray
LB		Rocen Keeton
DL		Brian Kelly
DB	26	Dion Lambert
LB		Brian Lockwood
DB		Damion Lyons
LB		James Malone
DL		Emmanuel Onwutuebe
LB	40	Roman Phifer
LB		Meech Shaw
DL		Siltupe Tuala
S	29	Eric Turner
DL		Matt Werner
DB		Michael Williams

Special teams

Pos.	#	Name	Class
K		Brad Daluiso
P		Courtney Keyler
P		Darren Schager

Head coach

- Terry Donahue

Coordinators/assistant coaches

- Homer Smith (OC)

Legend

- (C) Team captain
- (S) Suspended
- (I) Ineligible
- Injured
- Redshirt

== Awards and honors ==
- All-Americans: Roman Phifer (OLB), Eric Turner (S), Scott Miller (WR, third team)
- All-Conference First Team: Eric Turner (S), Roman Phifer (OLB)
