= 1990 USC Trojans football team =

American college football season

1990 USC Trojans football

John Hancock Bowl, L 16–17 vs. Michigan State
- Conference: Pacific-10 Conference

Ranking
- Coaches: No. 22
- AP: No. 20
- Record: 8–4–1 (5–2–1 Pac-10)
- Head coach: Larry Smith (4th season)
- Captain: Don Gibson
- Home stadium: Los Angeles Memorial Coliseum

1990 Pacific-10 Conference football standings
	Conf.					Overall
Team	W		L		T	W		L		T
No. 5 Washington $	7	–	1	–	0	10	–	2	–	0
No. 20 USC	5	–	2	–	1	8	–	4	–	1
Oregon	4	–	3	–	0	8	–	4	–	0
California	4	–	3	–	1	7	–	4	–	1
Arizona	5	–	4	–	0	7	–	5	–	0
UCLA	4	–	4	–	0	5	–	6	–	0
Stanford	4	–	4	–	0	5	–	6	–	0
Arizona State	2	–	5	–	0	4	–	7	–	0
Washington State	2	–	6	–	0	3	–	8	–	0
Oregon State	1	–	6	–	0	1	–	10	–	0
$ – Conference champion; Rankings from AP Poll

The 1990 USC Trojans football team represented the University of Southern California (USC) in the 1990 NCAA Division I-A football season. In their fourth year under head coach Larry Smith, the Trojans compiled an 8–4–1 record (5–2–1 against conference opponents), finished in second place in the Pacific-10 Conference (Pac-10), and outscored their opponents by a combined total of 348 to 274.

USC began the season by beating Syracuse in the eighth Kickoff Classic. They also won non-conference games against Penn State and Ohio State, the latter of which was suspended with 2:36 remaining because of severe thunderstorms. The Trojans would finish second in the Pac-10 and lost to Michigan State in their bowl game in an outcome reminiscent of their 1987 season.

Quarterback Todd Marinovich led the team in passing, completing 196 of 322 passes for 2,423 yards with 13 touchdowns and 12 interceptions. Mazio Royster led the team in rushing with 235 carries for 1,168 yards and eight touchdowns. Gary Wellman led the team in receiving with 66 catches for 1,015 yards and five touchdowns.

== Schedule ==
Date	Time	Opponent	Rank	Site	TV	Result	Attendance	Source
August 31	4:30 p.m.	vs. Syracuse*	No. 9	Giants Stadium; East Rutherford, NJ (Kickoff Classic)	Raycom	W 34–16	57,293	
September 15	12:30 p.m.	Penn State*	No. 6	Los Angeles Memorial Coliseum; Los Angeles, CA	ABC	W 19–14	70,594	
September 22	3:30 p.m.	at No. 21 Washington	No. 5	Husky Stadium; Seattle, WA	Prime	L 0–31	72,617	
September 29	12:30 p.m.	at No. 12 Ohio State*	No. 18	Ohio Stadium; Columbus, OH	ABC	W 35–26	89,422	
October 6	7:30 p.m.	Washington State	No. 15	Los Angeles Memorial Coliseum; Los Angeles, CA	Prime	W 30–17	59,357	
October 13	12:30 p.m.	at Stanford	No. 16	Stanford Stadium; Stanford, CA (rivalry)	ABC	W 37–22	62,000	
October 20	3:30 p.m.	Arizona^{†}	No. 15	Los Angeles Memorial Coliseum; Los Angeles, CA	Prime	L 26–35	68,212	
October 27	12:30 p.m.	at Arizona State	No. 21	Sun Devil Stadium; Tempe, AZ	ABC	W 13–6	64,715	
November 3	3:30 p.m.	California	No. 21	Los Angeles Memorial Coliseum; Los Angeles, CA	Prime	T 31–31	62,974	
November 10	3:30 p.m.	at Oregon State	No. 23	Parker Stadium; Corvallis, OR	Prime	W 56–7	18,795	
November 17	12:30 p.m.	at UCLA	No. 19	Rose Bowl; Pasadena, CA (Victory Bell)	ABC	W 45–42	98,088	
November 24	5:00 p.m.	No. 7 Notre Dame*	No. 18	Los Angeles Memorial Coliseum; Los Angeles, CA (Jeweled Shillelagh)	ABC	L 6–10	91,639	
December 31	11:30 a.m.	vs. No. 22 Michigan State*	No. 21	Sun Bowl; El Paso, TX (John Hancock Bowl)	CBS	L 16–17	50,562	
*Non-conference game; ^{†}Homecoming; Rankings from AP Poll released prior to the game

== Game summaries ==
=== Penn State ===
Team	1	2	3	4	Total
Penn St	0	7	0	7	14
• USC	7	6	6	0	19

- Date: September 15
- Location: Los Angeles Memorial Coliseum

Scoring summary
Q1	USC	Griffin 5 yard pass from Marinovich (Rodriguez kick)	USC 7–0
Q2	PSU	Golden 8 yard pass from Sacca (Fayak kick)	Tie 7–7
Q2	USC	Rodriguez 26 yard field goal	USC 10–7
Q2	USC	Rodriguez 46 yard field goal	USC 13–7
Q3	USC	Ervins 1 yard run (run failed)	USC 19–7
Q4	PSU	Thompson 2 yard run (Fayak kick)	USC 19–14

=== At Washington ===
All I saw was purple.

— Todd Marinovich

=== At UCLA ===
#19 USC Trojans (7–2–1) at UCLA Bruins (5–5)

Quarter	1	2	3	4	Total
USC	14	7	3	21	45
UCLA	7	7	7	21	42

at Rose Bowl, Pasadena, California

- Date: November 17
- Game weather: Sunny
- Game attendance: 98,088
- TV: ABC

Game information

First quarter

- USC – Stephon Pace 27-yard interception return (pass failed). USC 6–0.
- UCLA – Tommy Maddox 9-yard run (Brad Daluiso kick). UCLA 7–6.
- USC – Mazio Royster 7-yard run (pass good). USC 14–7.

Second quarter

- UCLA – Sean LaChapelle 47-yard pass from Tommy Maddox (Brad Daluiso kick). Tie 14–14.
- USC – Todd Marinovich 1-yard run (Quin Rodriguez kick). USC 21–14.

Third quarter

- USC – Quin Rodriguez 20-yard field goal, 4:19. USC 24–14. Drive: 19 plays, 68 yards.
- UCLA – Brian Brown 5-yard run (Brad Daluiso kick). USC 24–21.

Fourth quarter

- USC – Jason Oliver 34-yard interception return (Quin Rodriguez kick), 12:02. USC 31–21.
- UCLA – Scott Miller 29-yard pass from Tommy Maddox (Brad Daluiso kick), 10:46. USC 31–28.
- UCLA – Scott Miller 38-yard pass from Tommy Maddox (Brad Daluiso kick), 9:17. UCLA 35–31.
- USC – Johnnie Morton 21-yard pass from Todd Marinovich (Quin Rodriguez kick), 3:09. USC 38–35. Drive: 8 plays, 47 yards.
- UCLA – Kevin Smith 1-yard run (Brad Daluiso kick), 1:19. UCLA 42–38. Drive: 7 plays, 75 yards.
- USC – Johnnie Morton 23-yard pass from Todd Marinovich (Quin Rodriguez kick), 0:16. USC 45–42. Drive: 5 plays, 75 yards.

Top passers

- USC – Todd Marinovich – 16/25, 215 yards, 2 TD, INT
- UCLA – Tommy Maddox – 26/40, 409 yards, 3 TD, 3 INT

Top rushers

- USC – Mazio Royster – 31 rushes, 157 yards, TD
- UCLA – Tommy Maddox – 9 rushes, 36 yards, TD

Top receivers

- USC – Gary Wellman – 7 receptions, 99 yards
- UCLA – Scott Miller – 8 receptions, 175 yards, 2 TD

- 60th meeting
- Marinovich wasn't named starter until morning of the game

== Personnel ==
1990 USC Trojans football team roster
Players
Coaches
Offense

Pos.	#	Name	Class
OL		David Apolskis
TE		Bradford Banta
RB		Rory Brown
WR		Curtis Conway	So
TE		Bob Crane
OL		Derrick Deese	Jr
RB		Ricky Ervins
QB		Shane Foley
OL		Craig Gibson
TE		Frank Griffin
WR		Travis Hannah
WR		Pat Harlow
TE		Yonnie Jackson
RB		Tim Lavin
RB		Scott Lockwood
TE		Elic Mahone
QB		Todd Marinovich	RSo
OL		Michael Moody
WR		Johnnie Morton	Fr
QB		Pat O'Hara
QB		Reggie Perry
RB		Mazio Royster
WR		Joel Scott
RB		Raoul Spears
RB		Deon Strother
G	75	Mark Tucker	Sr
OL		Larry Wallace
WR	83	Gary Wellman	Sr

Defense

Pos.	#	Name	Class
LB		Kurt Barber
DL		Gene Fruge
LB		Matt Gee
DL		Don Gibson (C)
LB		Craig Hartsuyker
DB		Calvin Holmes
DB		Curtis Hopkins
DL		Terry McDaniels
DB		Jason Oliver
DB		Stephon Pace
LB	35	Scott Ross	Sr
DB		Mike Salmon
LB		Brian Tuliau

Special teams

Pos.	#	Name	Class
P		Ron Dale
K	11	Quin Rodriguez	Sr

Head coach

- Larry Smith

Coordinators/assistant coaches

- Tom Roggeman

Legend

- (C) Team captain
- (S) Suspended
- (I) Ineligible
- Injured
- Redshirt

Roster
Last update: 2022-Oct-14
