= 1990 Oregon State Beavers football team =

American college football season

1990 Oregon State Beavers football
- Conference: Pacific-10 Conference
- Record: 1–10 (1–6 Pac-10)
- Head coach: Dave Kragthorpe (6th season)
- Home stadium: Parker Stadium

1990 Pacific-10 Conference football standings
	Conf.					Overall
Team	W		L		T	W		L		T
No. 5 Washington $	7	–	1	–	0	10	–	2	–	0
No. 20 USC	5	–	2	–	1	8	–	4	–	1
Oregon	4	–	3	–	0	8	–	4	–	0
California	4	–	3	–	1	7	–	4	–	1
Arizona	5	–	4	–	0	7	–	5	–	0
UCLA	4	–	4	–	0	5	–	6	–	0
Stanford	4	–	4	–	0	5	–	6	–	0
Arizona State	2	–	5	–	0	4	–	7	–	0
Washington State	2	–	6	–	0	3	–	8	–	0
Oregon State	1	–	6	–	0	1	–	10	–	0
$ – Conference champion; Rankings from AP Poll

The 1990 Oregon State Beavers football team represented Oregon State University in the 1990 NCAA Division I-A football season. The Beavers ended the season with one win and ten losses. 1990 was Oregon State's 20th consecutive losing season. The Beavers scored 152 points and allowed 371 points. The team was led by head coach Dave Kragthorpe. The season is most memorable for the 35–21 win over Arizona. According to David Rothman, this was the greatest upset in all of college football between 1985 and 1998. The probability of Oregon State winning was 7.4%.

== Schedule ==
Date	Time	Opponent	Site	TV	Result	Attendance	Source
September 1	1:30 pm	Montana*	Parker Stadium; Corvallis, OR		L 15–22	25,201	
September 8	11:00 am	at Kansas*	Memorial Stadium; Lawrence, KS		L 12–38	28,500	
September 15	1:30 pm	UNLV*	Parker Stadium; Corvallis, OR		L 20–45	17,272	
September 22	12:30 pm	at Stanford	Stanford Stadium; Stanford, CA		L 3–37	45,000	
September 29	11:00 am	at No. 8 Nebraska*	Memorial Stadium; Lincoln, NE		L 7–31	76,061	
October 13	1:30 pm	No. 21 Arizona	Parker Stadium; Corvallis, OR		W 35–21	21,653	
October 20	1:30 pm	Washington State	Parker Stadium; Corvallis, OR		L 24–55	27,245	
October 27	3:30 pm	at UCLA	Rose Bowl; Pasadena, CA		L 17–26	42,427	
November 3	6:00 pm	at Arizona State	Sun Devil Stadium; Tempe, AZ		L 9–34	56,325	
November 10	3:30 pm	No. 23 USC	Parker Stadium; Corvallis, OR	Prime	L 7–56	18,795	
November 17	1:30 pm	Oregon	Parker Stadium; Corvallis, OR (Civil War)		L 3–6	35,962	
*Non-conference game; Rankings from AP Poll released prior to the game; Source:

== Roster ==
1990 Oregon State Beavers football team roster
Players
Coaches
Offense

Pos.	#	Name	Class
RB	33	Rodney Clemente	Jr
G		Alai Kalaniuvalu	Fr

Defense

Pos.	#	Name	Class
SS	1	Dennis Edwards	Fr
DE	99	Corey Brannon	Jr
DT	48	Esera Tuaolo	Sr

Special teams

Pos.	#	Name	Class

Head coach

- Dave Kragthorpe

Coordinators/assistant coaches

Legend

- (C) Team captain
- (S) Suspended
- (I) Ineligible
- Injured
- Redshirt
