= 1990 Washington State Cougars football team =

American college football season

1990 Washington State Cougars football
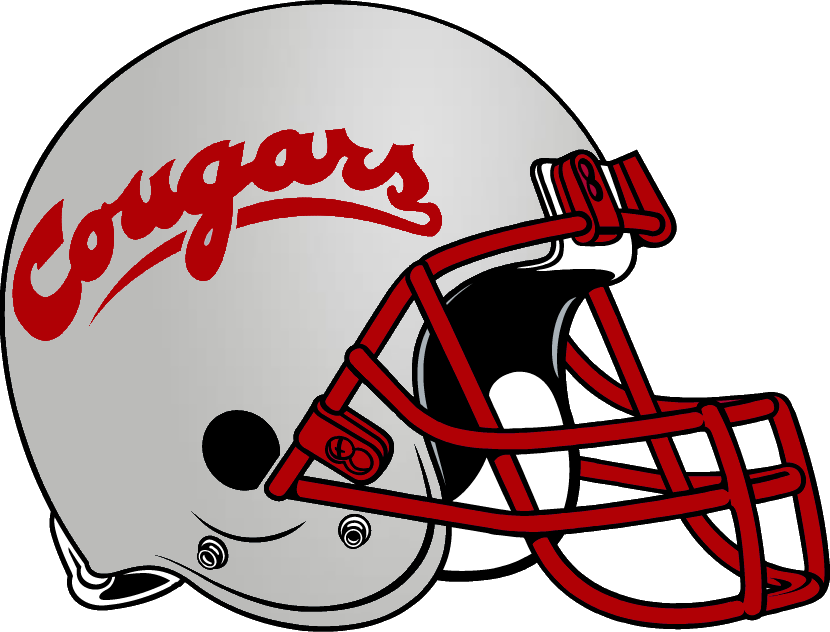
- Conference: Pacific-10 Conference
- Record: 3–8 (2–6 Pac-10)
- Head coach: Mike Price (2nd season)
- Offensive coordinator: Joe Tiller (2nd season)
- Offensive scheme: Spread
- Defensive coordinator: Mike Zimmer (2nd season)
- Base defense: 4–3
- Home stadium: Martin Stadium

1990 Pacific-10 Conference football standings
	Conf.					Overall
Team	W		L		T	W		L		T
No. 5 Washington $	7	–	1	–	0	10	–	2	–	0
No. 20 USC	5	–	2	–	1	8	–	4	–	1
Oregon	4	–	3	–	0	8	–	4	–	0
California	4	–	3	–	1	7	–	4	–	1
Arizona	5	–	4	–	0	7	–	5	–	0
UCLA	4	–	4	–	0	5	–	6	–	0
Stanford	4	–	4	–	0	5	–	6	–	0
Arizona State	2	–	5	–	0	4	–	7	–	0
Washington State	2	–	6	–	0	3	–	8	–	0
Oregon State	1	–	6	–	0	1	–	10	–	0
$ – Conference champion; Rankings from AP Poll

The 1990 Washington State Cougars football team was an American football team that represented Washington State University in the Pacific-10 Conference (Pac-10) during the 1990 NCAA Division I-A football season. In their second season under head coach Mike Price, the Cougars compiled a 3–8 record (2–6 in Pac-10, ninth), and were outscored by their opponents 381 to 286.

The team's statistical leaders included Drew Bledsoe with 1,386 passing yards, Shaumbe Wright-Fair with 739 rushing yards, and Phillip Bobo with 758 receiving yards.

WSU played three quarterbacks this season: senior Brad Gossen, redshirt sophomore Aaron Garcia, and true freshman Bledsoe, who started the final five games. The Cougars played their home games on campus at Martin Stadium in Pullman; sand-filled Omniturf was installed prior to the season, and the offset double-support goal posts made their debut.

For the only time since 1935, Northwest foe Oregon was not on the Cougars' schedule (excluding the war years without a team (1943, 1944)).

== Schedule ==
Date	Time	Opponent	Site	Result	Attendance	Source
September 1	5:00 pm	at TCU*	Amon G. Carter Stadium; Fort Worth, TX	W 21–3	25,198	
September 8	3:15 pm	Wyoming*	Martin Stadium; Pullman, WA	L 13–34	30,484	
September 15	11:00 am	at No. 5 BYU*	Cougar Stadium; Provo, UT	L 36–50	65,848	
September 22	2:00 pm	California	Martin Stadium; Pullman, WA	W 41–31	32,229	
September 29	8:00 pm	UCLA^{†}	Martin Stadium; Pullman, WA	L 20–30	34,190	
October 6	7:30 pm	at No. 15 USC	Los Angeles Memorial Coliseum; Los Angeles, CA	L 17–30	59,357	
October 20	1:30 pm	at Oregon State	Parker Stadium; Corvallis, OR	W 55–24	27,245	
October 27	7:00 pm	at No. 23 Arizona	Arizona Stadium; Tucson, AZ	L 34–42	55,520	
November 3	12:30 pm	at Stanford	Stanford Stadium; Stanford, CA	L 13–31	30,000	
November 10	1:00 pm	Arizona State	Martin Stadium; Pullman, WA	L 26–51	20,070	
November 17	3:00 pm	No. 10 Washington	Martin Stadium; Pullman, WA (Apple Cup)	L 10–55	37,600	
*Non-conference game; ^{†}Homecoming; Rankings from AP Poll released prior to the game; All times are in Pacific time

== Roster ==
1990 Washington State Cougars football team roster
Players
Coaches
Offense

Pos.	#	Name	Class
OT	75	Michael Bailey	Fr
QB	11	Drew Bledsoe	Fr
WR	2	Phillip Bobo	Fr
QB	18	Darrin Burchak	Jr
TE	89	Brett Carolan	Fr
RB	34	Paul Carr	Jr
WR	8	Desmond Clayton	Sr
G	70	Steve Cromer	Sr
TE	84	Chad Cushing	Jr
WR	1	C. J. Davis	So
QB	9	Aaron Garcia	So
OT	74	Bob Garman	Jr
WR	5	Calvin Griggs	Sr
QB	12	Brad Gossen	Sr
C	61	Robert Norvell	Sr
QB	13	Mike Pattinson	Fr
G	63	Mike Smith	Sr
RB	33	Rich Swinton	Sr
RB	44	Phillip Tuivali
TE	98	Clarence Williams	So
G	76	Steve Wolfe	So
RB	32	Shaumbe Wright-Fair	So
WR	87	Ron Young	Sr

Defense

Pos.	#	Name	Class
LB	48	Lewis Bush (S)	Jr
FS	22	John Diggs	Sr
FS	27	Alvin Dunn	Sr
SS	42	Ron Hawkins	Jr
LB	19	Kurt Loertscher	So
LB	41	Anthony McClanahan	Fr
LB	6	Chris Moton	Sr
LB	52	Curt Newton	Sr
LB	93	Rod Plummer	Jr
CB	28	Anthony Prior	Jr
CB	26	Ron Ricard	Sr
DT	64	Constantino Romero	Jr
DE	83	Lee Tilleman	Sr
DE	92	Dan Webber	Sr
DT	94	Kirk Westerfield	Jr
DT	90	Jeron Woodley	Sr
CB	20	Michael Wright	Jr

Special teams

Pos.	#	Name	Class
PK, P	4	Jason Hanson	Jr

Head coach

- Mike Price (2nd year)

Coordinators/assistant coaches

- Joe Tiller - OC
- Mike Zimmer - DC
- Bill Doba - LB
- Chris Ball - GA

Legend

- (C) Team captain
- (S) Suspended
- (I) Ineligible
- Injured
- Redshirt
