= Kickoff Classic =

Football Game

Kickoff Classic (defunct)
- Stadium: Giants Stadium
- Location: East Rutherford, New Jersey
- Operated: 1983–2002

The Kickoff Classic was a season-opening college football game played at Giants Stadium in East Rutherford, New Jersey from 1983 to 2002.

== History ==
In 1978, the New Jersey Sports and Exposition Authority (NJSEA), which operated and scheduled events at Giants Stadium, decided to host an end-of-season bowl game, called the Garden State Bowl. There were four such bowl games held, but attendance was lower than hoped by the NJSEA due to December weather and less attractive teams. Consequently, NJSEA decided to host a "bowl" game in the beginning of the season instead. This would attract more popular teams and ensure better attendance due to more favorable weather conditions.

The first contest, held on August 29, 1983, was the first regular-season college football game to be played in the month of August. (Note: Two other games involving collegiate teams were played in August beforehand: on August 31, 1894, the University of Chicago defeated the "Chicago Dining Club", 4–0, but contemporary news accounts indicate that this was more of an intra-squad game, with the Maroons' opponents being hand-picked by U of C athletic director Abe Bowers. On August 25, 1944, the March Field squad (one of the military teams that played a collegiate schedule during World War II) lost to the National Football League's Washington Redskins, 7–3, in front of 55,000 fans at the Los Angeles Memorial Coliseum. This makes the Kickoff Classic the first August matchup between two actual college teams.) The game featured the defending national champions Penn State Nittany Lions and the pre-season No. 1 ranked team, the Nebraska Cornhuskers. The game was not carried by any of the networks broadcasting college football at the time; instead, the rights to the game were sold into syndication by Michael Botwinik's Katz Communications, and the game aired on various local stations throughout the country. (One of these stations, Philadelphia's WKBS, signed off for good right after the game, making the inaugural Kickoff Classic the last program the station carried.)

Eventually there would be twenty Kickoff Classics, many of which were carried by ABC Sports nationally. Participation in the Kickoff Classic allowed teams to play a twelve-game regular season. Rule changes by the NCAA regarding season opening 'extra games' brought an end to the series in 2002, as well as similar games, such as the west coast-based Pigskin Classic and the midwest-based Eddie Robinson Classic.

In 2008, a new form of kickoff games were born. While not cut from the same mold, the Chick-fil-A Kickoff Game held its inaugural game in Atlanta, Georgia in an effort to direct the nation's attention to one site for the start of the college football season.

== Game results ==
Date	Winning Team		Losing Team		MVP					Announcers
August 29, 1983	#1 Nebraska	44	#4 Penn State	6	Turner Gill	QB	Nebraska	71,123	Katz Sports	Curt Gowdy, Lee Corso and Dave Diles
August 27, 1984	#10 Miami (FL)	20	#1 Auburn	18	Bernie Kosar	QB	Miami (FL)	51,131	Katz Sports	Curt Gowdy and Len Dawson
August 29, 1985	#10 BYU	28	Boston College	14	Robbie Bosco	QB	BYU	51,227	Raycom Sports	Merle Harmon, Bud Wilkinson and Kevin Kiley
August 27, 1986	#5 Alabama	16	#9 Ohio State	10	Chris Spielman	LB	Ohio State	68,296	Raycom Sports	Merle Harmon, Steve Davis and Kevin Kiley
August 30, 1987	#17 Tennessee	23	#16 Iowa	22	Reggie Cobb	RB	Tennessee	54,681	ABC Sports	Keith Jackson and Bob Griese
August 27, 1988	#2 Nebraska	23	#10 Texas A&M	14	Steve Taylor	QB	Nebraska	58,172	Raycom Sports	Phil Stone and Dave Rowe
August 31, 1989	#2 Notre Dame	36	Virginia	13	Tony Rice	QB	Notre Dame	77,323	Raycom Sports	Phil Stone and Dave Rowe
August 31, 1990	#9 USC	34	Syracuse	16	Todd Marinovich	QB	USC	57,293	Raycom Sports	Phil Stone and Dave Rowe
August 28, 1991	#7 Penn State	34	#8 Georgia Tech	22	Tony Sacca	QB	Penn State	77,409	Raycom Sports	Tim Brant and Dave Rowe
August 29, 1992	NC State	24	#16 Iowa	14	Terry Jordan	QB	NC State	46,251	Raycom Sports	Phil Stone and Dave Rowe
August 28, 1993	#1 Florida State	42	Kansas	0	Derrick Brooks	LB	Florida State	51,734	ABC Sports	Keith Jackson and Bob Griese
August 28, 1994	#4 Nebraska	31	#24 West Virginia	0	Tommie Frazier	QB	Nebraska	58,233	ABC Sports	Keith Jackson and Bob Griese
August 27, 1995	#12 Ohio State	38	#22 Boston College	6	Eddie George	TB	Ohio State	62,711	ABC Sports	Keith Jackson and Bob Griese
August 25, 1996	#11 Penn State	24	#7 USC	7	Curtis Enis	TB	Penn State	77,716	ABC Sports	Keith Jackson and Bob Griese
August 24, 1997	#17 Syracuse	34	#24 Wisconsin	0	Donovan McNabb	QB	Syracuse	51,185	ABC Sports	Brad Nessler, Gary Danielson and Dean Blevins
August 31, 1998	#2 Florida State	23	#14 Texas A&M	14	Peter Warrick	WR	Florida State	59,232	ABC Sports	Keith Jackson and Bob Griese
August 29, 1999	#12 Miami (FL)	23	#9 Ohio State	12	Kenny Kelly	QB	Miami (FL)	73,037	ABC Sports	Brent Musburger, Dan Fouts and Dean Blevins
August 27, 2000	#15 USC	29	#22 Penn State	5	Sultan McCullough	TB	USC	78,902	ABC Sports	Keith Jackson, Tim Brant and Todd Harris
August 26, 2001	#10 Georgia Tech	13	Syracuse	7	Kelly Campbell	WR	Georgia Tech	41,517	ABC Sports	Brad Nessler, Bob Griese and Lynn Swann
August 31, 2002	Notre Dame	22	#21 Maryland	0	Nick Setta	PK	Notre Dame	72,903	ABC Sports	Brent Musburger, Gary Danielson and Jack Arute

Rankings from AP Poll prior to game.
