= 1990 Washington Huskies football team =

American college football season

1990 Washington Huskies football

National co-champion (Rothman) Pac-10 champion Rose Bowl champion

Rose Bowl, W 46–34 vs. Iowa
- Conference: Pacific-10 Conference

Ranking
- Coaches: No. 5
- AP: No. 5
- Record: 10–2 (7–1 Pac-10)
- Head coach: Don James (16th season)
- Offensive coordinator: Gary Pinkel (7th season)
- Defensive coordinator: Jim Lambright (13th season)
- MVP: Greg Lewis
- Captains: Eric Briscoe; Dean Kirkland; Greg Lewis; Travis Richardson
- Home stadium: Husky Stadium

1990 Pacific-10 Conference football standings
	Conf.					Overall
Team	W		L		T	W		L		T
No. 5 Washington $	7	–	1	–	0	10	–	2	–	0
No. 20 USC	5	–	2	–	1	8	–	4	–	1
Oregon	4	–	3	–	0	8	–	4	–	0
California	4	–	3	–	1	7	–	4	–	1
Arizona	5	–	4	–	0	7	–	5	–	0
UCLA	4	–	4	–	0	5	–	6	–	0
Stanford	4	–	4	–	0	5	–	6	–	0
Arizona State	2	–	5	–	0	4	–	7	–	0
Washington State	2	–	6	–	0	3	–	8	–	0
Oregon State	1	–	6	–	0	1	–	10	–	0
$ – Conference champion; Rankings from AP Poll

The 1990 Washington Huskies football team represented the University of Washington in the 1990 NCAA Division I-A football season.

The Huskies won their first conference championship since 1981 and defeated No. 17 Iowa in the Rose Bowl by twelve points, 46–34. It was the first victory in that game in nine years as well, when Washington crushed Iowa 28–0 in the 1982 game. The Huskies were led by head coach Don James, offensive coordinator Gary Pinkel, and defensive coordinator Jim Lambright. Pinkel left Washington after the season to become head coach at Toledo, where he stayed for a decade and then moved to Missouri. Lambright succeeded James as head coach of the Huskies in August 1993.

Five Huskies were selected in the 1991 NFL draft, led by running back Greg Lewis and defensive back Charles Mincy. Sophomore defensive lineman Steve Emtman was the first overall pick in 1992.

== Schedule ==
Date	Time	Opponent	Rank	Site	TV	Result	Attendance	Source
September 8	12:30 p.m.	San Jose State*	No. 20	Husky Stadium; Seattle, WA		W 20–17	66,337	
September 15	11:00 a.m.	at Purdue*	No. 22	Ross–Ade Stadium; West Lafayette, IN		W 20–14	33,113	
September 22	3:30 p.m.	No. 5 USC	No. 21	Husky Stadium; Seattle, WA	Prime	W 31–0	72,617	
September 29	12:30 p.m.	at No. 20 Colorado*	No. 12	Folsom Field; Boulder, CO	Prime	L 14–20	52,868	
October 6	4:00 p.m.	at Arizona State	No. 17	Sun Devil Stadium; Tempe, AZ	Prime	W 42–14	62,738	
October 13	12:30 p.m.	No. 19 Oregon	No. 17	Husky Stadium; Seattle, WA (rivalry)	ABC	W 38–17	73,498	
October 20	12:30 p.m.	at Stanford	No. 13	Stanford Stadium; Stanford, CA	ABC	W 52–16	36,500	
October 27	12:30 p.m.	California	No. 7	Husky Stadium; Seattle, WA		W 46–7	71,427	
November 3	12:30 p.m.	No. 23 Arizona	No. 7	Husky Stadium; Seattle, WA	ABC	W 54–10	70,111	
November 10	12:30 p.m.	UCLA	No. 2	Husky Stadium; Seattle, WA	ABC	L 22–25	71,925	
November 17	3:00 p.m.	at Washington State	No. 10	Martin Stadium; Pullman, WA (Apple Cup)	Prime	W 55–10	37,600	
January 1, 1991	2:00 p.m.	vs. No. 17 Iowa*	No. 8	Rose Bowl; Pasadena, CA (Rose Bowl)	ABC	W 46–34	101,273	
*Non-conference game; Rankings from AP Poll released prior to the game; All times are in Pacific time; Source:

== Season summary ==
The Huskies were ranked #20 in the 1990 pre-season, and started slowly with close wins over San José State at home and at Purdue. In the third game, #5 USC, in pursuit of a fourth straight Rose Bowl, entered Husky Stadium as a five-point favorite with a four-game winning streak over UW, but was shut out 31–0 on a hot afternoon on the Seattle AstroTurf. The game started at 3:30 p.m. in the 92 °F (33 °C) heat and the opportunistic Huskies led 24–0 at the half. Sacked three times and under pressure all day, Trojan QB Todd Marinovich stated, "I just saw purple. That's all I saw. No numbers, no faces, just purple."

The Huskies suffered a letdown the following week, losing to #20 Colorado in Boulder by six. (Colorado would claim half of the 1990 national championship, tainted by the "fifth down" touchdown at Missouri the following week.) The UW Dawgs regrouped and rolled through the next five games, all in conference and by large margins, and climbed to 8–1 record; they clinched the league title and Rose Bowl berth on November 3 after a 54–10 drubbing of #23 Arizona.

The Huskies moved up five places to a #2 national ranking, behind Notre Dame, when UCLA visited the following week. In the wind and under dark but rainless skies on November 10, the 21-point underdog Bruins jumped out to an early lead with an 89-yard run. The game went back and forth, and was tied at 22 until a late field goal by UCLA ended UW's national title hopes. The Huskies took their frustration at the loss and their drop in ranking to #10 by crushing Washington State in Pullman to win the Apple Cup 55–10. The Cougars scored their touchdown on Husky reserves with less than three minutes remaining to close the margin to 45 points.

The #8 ranked Pac-10 champs then took on the Big Ten champions, #17 Iowa Hawkeyes, in the Rose Bowl, winning 46–34. Entering the fourth quarter with a 39–14 lead, reserves were entered into the game for the Huskies and promptly gave up two touchdowns; UW then scored its own touchdown to push the lead back to 46–26, answered by an Iowa TD and conversion to close the final score to a 12-point gap. The Huskies, like all Pac-10 teams in 1990, played an eight-game conference schedule. They did not play Oregon State, who finished last in the Pac-10 at 1–10 overall (1–7 in conference) and fired sixth-year head coach Dave Kragthorpe.

=== At Purdue ===
#22 Washington at Purdue

Team	1	2	3	4	Total
• Huskies	7	3	3	7	20
Boilermakers	14	0	0	0	14

- Date: September 15
- Location: Ross–Ade Stadium

Scoring summary
Q1	PUR	Vinson 11 yard pass from Hunter (Sullivan kick)	PUR 7–0
Q1	WASH	Brunell 47 yard run (Dodd kick)	Tie 7–7
Q1	PUR	Dennis 54 yard pass from Hunter (Sullivan kick)	PUR 14—7
Q2	WASH	Dodd 28 yard field goal	PUR 14–10
Q3	WASH	Dodd 20 yard field goal	PUR 14–13
Q4	WASH	McKay 35 yard pass from Brunell (Dodd kick)	WASH 20–14

=== USC ===
"All I saw was purple," -Todd Marinovich on Washington's defense

=== At Colorado ===
#12 Washington at #20 Colorado

Team	1	2	3	4	Total
Huskies	7	0	7	0	14
• Buffaloes	0	3	14	3	20

- Date: September 29
- Location: Folsom Field, Boulder, CO
- Game start: 1:31 PM
- Elapsed time: 2:46
- Game attendance: 52,868
- Game weather: 55 °F (13 °C), cloudy, Wind E 3 mph (4.8 km/h)
- Referee: Dean Cramer
- Source: Box score

Scoring summary
Q1	6:25	WASH	Mark Brunell 1-yard run (Dodd kick)	WASH 7–0
Q2	0:00	COL	Harper 47-yard field goal	WASH 7–3
Q3	12:47	COL	Darian Hagan 15-yard run (Harper kick)	COL 10–7
Q3	7:22	WASH	Pierce 3-yard pass from Brunell (Dodd kick)	WASH 14–10
Q3	4:52	COL	Darian Hagan 3-yard run (Harper kick)	COL 17–14
Q4	13:05	COL	Harper 32-yard field goal	COL 20-14

=== Vs. Iowa (Rose Bowl) ===
#17 Iowa vs. #8 Washington

Team	1	2	3	4	Total
Hawkeyes	0	7	7	20	34
• Huskies	10	23	6	7	46

- Date: January 1, 1991
- Location: Rose Bowl
  Pasadena, CA
- Game attendance: 101,273
- Referee: Pat Flood
- TV announcers (ABC): Keith Jackson, Bob Griese, and Jack Arute

Scoring summary
1	Wash	Hanson 23-yard field goal	Wash 3–0
1	Wash	Hall 27-yard return of blocked punt (Hanson kick)	Wash 10–0
2	Iowa	Nick Bell 15-yard run (Skillett kick)	Wash 10–7
2	Wash	Hanson 34-yard field goal	Wash 13–7
2	Wash	Mincy 37-yard interception return (pass failed)	Wash 19–7
2	Wash	Mark Brunell 5-yard run (Hanson kick)	Wash 26–7
2	Wash	Mario Bailey 22-yard pass from Mark Brunell (Hanson kick)	Wash 33–7
3	Iowa	Matt Rodgers 7-yard run (Skillett kick)	Wash 33–14
3	Wash	Mark Brunell 20-yard run (run failed)	Wash 39–14
4	Iowa	Matt Rodgers 9-yard run (run failed)	Wash 39–20
4	Iowa	Nick Bell 20-yard run (pass failed)	Wash 39–26
4	Wash	Mario Bailey 31-yard pass from Mark Brunell (Hanson kick)	Wash 46–26
4	Iowa	Saunders 12-yard pass from Rodgers (Velicer pass from Rodgers)	Wash 46–34

== Roster ==
1990 Washington Huskies football team roster
Players
Coaches
Offense

Pos.	#	Name	Class
SE	5	Mario Bailey	So
RB	42	Jay Berry	So
QB	11	Mark Brunell	So
RB	29	Beno Bryant	So
C	79	Ed Cunningham	Jr
QB	12	Billy Joe Hobert	So
FB	22	Matt Jones	So
G	56	Pete Kaligis	So
OT	75	Lincoln Kennedy	So
G	51	Dean Kirkland (C)	Sr
TB	20	Greg Lewis (C)	Sr
OT	70	Siupeli Malamala	Jr
FL	4	Orlando McKay	Jr
OT	58	Jeff Pahukoa	Sr
OT	71	Pete Pierson	So
TE	84	Aaron Pierce	Jr
G	76	Rick Schulberg	Sr
FB	31	Darius Turner	So

Defense

Pos.	#	Name	Class
ROV	28	Eric Briscoe (C)	Sr
LB	46	Brett Collins	Jr
MG	93	John Cook	Sr
DE	90	Steve Emtman	So
DT	75	D'Marco Farr	So
CB	26	Jaime Fields	So
ILB	39	Chico Fraley	Jr
CB	5	Dana Hall	Jr
ILB	54	Dave Hoffman	So
OLB	48	Donald Jones	Jr
DE	13	Andy Mason	Fr
CB	1	Charles Mincy	Sr
FS	21	Shane Pahukoa	So
DE	58	Travis Richardson (C)	Sr

Special teams

Pos.	#	Name	Class
PK	4	Travis Hanson	Fr
P	27	Channing Wyles	Sr

Head coach

- Don James (15th year)

Coordinators/assistant coaches

- Gary Pinkel – OC
- Jim Lambright – DC
- Keith Gilbertson – OL

Legend

- (C) Team captain
- (S) Suspended
- (I) Ineligible
- Injured
- Redshirt

== Awards ==
- Greg Lewis, running back: Doak Walker Award (inaugural)

== NFL draft ==
Five Huskies were selected in the 1991 NFL draft, which lasted twelve rounds (334 selections).

Player	Position	Round	Overall	Franchise
Greg Lewis	RB	5th	115	Denver Broncos
Charles Mincy	DB	5th	133	Kansas City Chiefs
Dean Kirkland	G	11th	305	Buffalo Bills
Jeff Pahukoa	T	12th	311	Los Angeles Rams
John Cook	MG	12th	328	Chicago Bears

Both 1990 Washington quarterbacks were selected in the 1993 NFL draft. Sophomore starter Mark Brunell was taken by the Green Bay Packers in the fifth round with the 118th pick. Brunell was a reserve for two seasons behind Brett Favre in Green Bay, then led the expansion Jacksonville Jaguars in 1995. Redshirt freshman Billy Joe Hobert was drafted by the Los Angeles Raiders in the third round with the 58th pick.

== Notes ==
- Greg Lewis set a new University of Washington record for rushing yards in a season with 1,407 yards. This eclipsed his own record of 1,197 yards from 1989. The record is currently held by Bishop Sankey.

== See also ==
- College football national championships in NCAA Division I FBS
