= 1990 Stanford Cardinal football team =

American college football season

1990 Stanford Cardinal football
- Conference: Pacific-10 Conference
- Record: 5–6 (4–4 Pac-10)
- Head coach: Dennis Green (2nd season)
- Offensive coordinator: Ron Turner (2nd season)
- Offensive scheme: West Coast
- Defensive coordinator: Willie Shaw (1st season)
- Base defense: 4–3
- Home stadium: Stanford Stadium

1990 Pacific-10 Conference football standings
	Conf.					Overall
Team	W		L		T	W		L		T
No. 5 Washington $	7	–	1	–	0	10	–	2	–	0
No. 20 USC	5	–	2	–	1	8	–	4	–	1
Oregon	4	–	3	–	0	8	–	4	–	0
California	4	–	3	–	1	7	–	4	–	1
Arizona	5	–	4	–	0	7	–	5	–	0
UCLA	4	–	4	–	0	5	–	6	–	0
Stanford	4	–	4	–	0	5	–	6	–	0
Arizona State	2	–	5	–	0	4	–	7	–	0
Washington State	2	–	6	–	0	3	–	8	–	0
Oregon State	1	–	6	–	0	1	–	10	–	0
$ – Conference champion; Rankings from AP Poll

The 1990 Stanford Cardinal football team represented Stanford University as a member of the Pacific-10 Conference (Pac-10) during the 1990 NCAA Division I-A football season. Led by second-year head coach Dennis Green, the Cardinal compiled an overall record of 5–6 with a mark of 4–4 in conference play, tying for sixth place in the Pac-10. The team played home games at Stanford Stadium in Stanford, California.

== Schedule ==
Date	Time	Opponent	Site	TV	Result	Attendance	Source
September 6	5:00 p.m.	at No. 6 Colorado*	Folsom Field; Boulder, CO	ESPN	L 17–21	50,669	
September 15	3:30 p.m.	at UCLA	Rose Bowl; Pasadena, CA (rivalry)		L 31–32	45,855	
September 22	12:30 p.m.	Oregon State	Stanford Stadium; Stanford, CA		W 37–3	45,000	
September 29	12:30 p.m.	San Jose State*	Stanford Stadium; Stanford, CA (rivalry)		L 23–29	45,500	
October 6	10:00 a.m.	at No. 1 Notre Dame*	Notre Dame Stadium; Notre Dame, IN (rivalry)		W 36–31	59,075	
October 13	12:30 p.m.	No. 16 USC	Stanford Stadium; Stanford, CA (rivalry)	ABC	L 22–37	62,000	
October 20	12:30 p.m.	No. 13 Washington	Stanford Stadium; Stanford, CA	ABC	L 16–52	36,500	
October 27	1:00 p.m.	No. 25 Oregon	Autzen Stadium; Eugene, OR (rivalry)		L 0–31	37,559	
November 3	12:30 p.m.	Washington State	Stanford Stadium; Stanford, CA		W 31–13	30,000	
November 10	1:00 p.m.	at Arizona	Arizona Stadium; Tucson, AZ		W 23–10	52,609	
November 17	3:30 p.m.	at California	California Memorial Stadium; Berkeley, CA (Big Game)		W 27–25	75,662	
*Non-conference game; Rankings from AP Poll released prior to the game; All times are in Pacific time; Source:

== Game summaries ==
=== At Colorado ===
Stanford at #5 Colorado

Team	1	2	3	4	Total
Cardinal	14	0	0	3	17
• Buffaloes	0	0	14	7	21

- Date: September 6
- Location: Folsom Field, Boulder, CO
- Game start: 6:08 PM
- Elapsed time: 3:14
- Game attendance: 50,699
- Game weather: 77 °F (25 °C), partly cloudy, Wind NW 5 mph (8.0 km/h)
- Referee: Dean Cramer
- Source: Box score

Scoring summary
Q1	5:47	STAN	Palumbis 1-yard run (Hopkins kick)	STAN 7–0
Q1	4:09	STAN	Vardell 1-yard run (Hopkins kick)	STAN 14–0
Q3	8:04	COL	Eric Bieniemy 18-yard run (Harper kick)	STAN 14–7
Q3	5:09	COL	Eric Bieniemy 36-yard run (Harper kick)	Tied 14–14
Q4	4:17	STAN	Hopkins 27-yard field goal	STAN 17–14
Q4	0:12	COL	Eric Bieniemy 1-yard run (Harper kick)	COL 21-17

=== At Notre Dame ===
Stanford at #1 Notre Dame

Team	1	2	3	4	Total
• Cardinal	7	8	14	7	36
Fighting Irish	7	17	7	0	31

- Date: September 22
- Location: Notre Dame Stadium, Notre Dame, IN
- Game attendance: 59,075

Scoring summary
1	ND	Mirer 1 yard run (Hentrich kick)	ND 7-0
1	Sta	Milburn 9 run (Hopkins kick)	Tied 7-7
2	ND	Hentrich 29 yard field goal	ND 10-7
2	ND	T. Smith 11 yard pass from Mirer (Hentrich kick)	ND 17-7
2	ND	T. Smith 15 yard pass from Mirer (Hentrich kick)	ND 24-7
2	Sta	Vardell 1 yard run (Palumbis to McCafferty pass)	ND 24-15
3	Sta	Vardell 1 yard run (Hopkins kick)	ND 24-22
3	ND	Culver 1 yard run (Hentrich kick)	ND 31-22
3	Sta	Vardell 1 yard run (Hopkins kick)	ND 31-29
4	Sta	Vardell 1 yard run (Hopkins kick)	Stan 36-31

=== At California ===
Team	1	2	3	4	Total
• Stanford	0	6	9	12	27
California	3	14	0	8	25

- Date: November 17
- Location: Memorial Stadium
- Game attendance: 75,662

Scoring summary
Q1		CAL	Keen 50 yard field goal	CAL 3–0
Q2		STAN	Hopkins 26 yard field goal	Tie 3–3
Q2		CAL	White 2 yard run (Keen kick)	CAL 10–3
Q2		CAL	Dawkins 15 yard pass from Pawlawski (Keen kick)	CAL 17–3
Q2		STAN	Hopkins 29 yard field goal	CAL 17–6
Q3		STAN	Hopkins 47 yard field goal	CAL 17–9
Q3		STAN	Milburn 53 yard run (run failed)	CAL 17–15
Q3		STAN	Hopkins 22 yard field goal	STAN 18–17
Q4		CAL	White 8 yard pass from Pawlawski (Zomadt pass from Pawlawski)	CAL 25–18
Q4	0:12	STAN	McCaffrey 19 yard pass from Palumbis (pass failed)	CAL 25–24
Q4	0:00	STAN	Hopkins 39 yard field goal	STAN 27–25

- Glyn Milburn 24 rush, 196 yds, 9 rec, 66 yds

== Roster ==
1990 Stanford Cardinal football team roster
Players
Coaches
Offense

Pos.	#	Name	Class
TE		Cory Booker
QB	17	John Lynch	So
WR	40	Ed McCaffrey	Sr
RB	5	Glyn Milburn	So
QB	12	Jason Palumbis	Jr
FB	44	Tommy Vardell	Jr
WR	80	Chris Walsh	Jr
OT	70	Bob Whitfield	Jr

Defense

Pos.	#	Name	Class
CB	21	Darrien Gordon	So

Special teams

Pos.	#	Name	Class
K	94	John Hopkins	Sr

Head coach

- Dennis Green

Coordinators/assistant coaches

- Ron Turner – Offensive coordinator and quarterbacks
- Tyrone Willingham – Running backs
- Brian Billick – Wide receivers and tight ends
- Scott Schuhmann – Offensive line
- Chris Foerster – Assistant offensive line
- Willie Shaw – Defensive coordinator and defensive backs
- Mike Nelson – Defensive line
- Mike Tolleson – Inside linebackers
- Dave Tipton – Outside linebackers

Legend

- (C) Team captain
- (S) Suspended
- (I) Ineligible
- Injured
- Redshirt
