= 1990 John Hancock Bowl =

American college football game

- 57th Sun Bowl
Michigan State Spartans	USC Trojans
(7–3–1)	(8–3–1)
Big Ten	Pac-10
17	16
Head coach: George Perles	Head coach: Larry Smith
AP / Coaches; 22 / 20	AP / Coaches; 21 / 18
	1	2	3	4	Total
Michigan State	0	7	10	0	17
USC	7	0	3	6	16
- Date: December 31, 1990
- Season: 1990
- Stadium: Sun Bowl
- Location: El Paso, Texas
- MVP: Courtney Hawkins (WR, Michigan State)
- Attendance: 50,562

United States TV coverage
- Network: CBS
- Announcers: Brad Nessler; Dan Jiggetts; Mike Joy

The 1990 John Hancock Bowl was a college football postseason bowl game between the Michigan State Spartans and the USC Trojans. It was the 57th edition of the Sun Bowl played at the stadium of the same name in El Paso, TX.

== Background ==
The Spartans were co-champions (with Iowa, Michigan & Illinois) of the Big Ten Conference for the second time in four seasons, with this being their fourth straight bowl appearance. Michigan State won their last five games after starting 2-3-1, led by a punishing defense (2nd in the Big Ten with 313.1 yards allowed) and two 1,000 yard rushers in Tico Duckett and Hyland Hickson. This was the first time a Big Ten team appeared in the Sun Bowl. USC was in their first ever Sun Bowl, finishing 2nd in the Pacific-10 Conference after three straight conference titles in the last 3 seasons. These two teams had met twice before, one being the season opener in 1987 at Michigan State, and the 1988 Rose Bowl, with the Spartans winning both times. It was in doubt that Marinovich would start two days to gametime due to an ear infection that led to him missing practices.

== Game summary ==
Todd Marinovich hit Gary Wellman for a touchdown just before the first quarter ended to give USC a 7–0 lead. Amidst a second quarter marred with several penalties, an injury, an ejection, a missed field goal, and two fumbles, Michigan State came out with a touchdown after a turnover. USC decided to go for a touchdown on 4th and 1 near the goal-line. However, Marinovich fumbled the ball and Alan Haller recovered for the Spartans, giving them the ball at the 20. 80 yards and 10 plays later, Michigan State had tied the game, just before halftime. Quinn Rodriguez gave USC the lead back in the third quarter with a field goal on their first drive. However, the Spartans quickly struck back, on a Dan Enos touchdown pass to Courtney Hawkins to give them a 14–10 lead. After the kickoff, Michigan State struck again as Marinovich's first pass on the drive was intercepted by Freddie Wilson, which set up a field goal to increase the lead to 17–10. In the fourth quarter, Rodriguez narrowed the lead with two more field goals to make it 17–16 with 3:12 remaining. But the Spartans ran out the clock on seven rushing attempts and two first downs to give the Spartans their third victory over USC in three years.

== Aftermath ==
It was during this game where the heated verbal barrage between Larry Smith and Marinovich became exposed in full view of a national TV audience, with Marinovich yelling at him, after Smith replaced him for Shane Foley with nine minutes remaining in the game. Marinovich soon left the school for the NFL following an arrest for cocaine possession a month after the game. Though the Trojans would return to a bowl game two seasons later (the 1992 Freedom Bowl), they lost, and Smith was fired. The Spartans would return to a bowl game three years later (the 1993 Liberty Bowl), though they wouldn't win one until the 1999 season (the 2000 Florida Citrus Bowl). Both programs later returned to the Sun Bowl, Michigan State to the 1996 edition and USC to the 1998 edition.

== Statistics ==
Statistic	MSU	USC
First downs	12	21
Rushing yards	84	156
Passing yards	131	180
Total yards	215	336
Passes (att-comp-int)	17–9–1	32–19–3
Punts–average	5–38.6	1–50
Fumbles–lost	1–1	2–1
Penalties–yards	6–54	5–45
