= 1990 California Golden Bears football team =

American college football season

1990 California Golden Bears football

Copper Bowl, W 17–15 vs. Wyoming
- Conference: Pacific-10 Conference
- Record: 7–4–1 (4–3–1 Pac-10)
- Head coach: Bruce Snyder (4th season)
- Offensive coordinator: Steve Mariucci (1st season)
- Defensive coordinator: Kent Baer (4th season)
- Home stadium: California Memorial Stadium

1990 Pacific-10 Conference football standings
	Conf.					Overall
Team	W		L		T	W		L		T
No. 5 Washington $	7	–	1	–	0	10	–	2	–	0
No. 20 USC	5	–	2	–	1	8	–	4	–	1
Oregon	4	–	3	–	0	8	–	4	–	0
California	4	–	3	–	1	7	–	4	–	1
Arizona	5	–	4	–	0	7	–	5	–	0
UCLA	4	–	4	–	0	5	–	6	–	0
Stanford	4	–	4	–	0	5	–	6	–	0
Arizona State	2	–	5	–	0	4	–	7	–	0
Washington State	2	–	6	–	0	3	–	8	–	0
Oregon State	1	–	6	–	0	1	–	10	–	0
$ – Conference champion; Rankings from AP Poll

The 1990 California Golden Bears football team was an American football team that represented the University of California, Berkeley in the Pacific-10 Conference (Pac-10) during the 1990 NCAA Division I-A football season. In their fourth year under head coach Bruce Snyder, the Golden Bears compiled a 7–4–1 record (4–3–1 against Pac-10 opponents), finished in fourth place in the Pac-10, and were outscored by their opponents by a combined total of 341 to 325.

The team's statistical leaders included Mike Pawlawski with 2,069 passing yards, Anthony Wallace with 1,002 rushing yards, and Brian Treggs with 564 receiving yards.

== Schedule ==
Date	Opponent	Site	TV	Result	Attendance	Source
September 8	at Wisconsin*	Camp Randall Stadium; Madison, WI		W 28–12	45,980	
September 15	No. 10 Miami (FL)*	California Memorial Stadium; Berkeley, CA	ABC	L 24–52	47,000	
September 22	at Washington State	Martin Stadium; Pullman, WA		L 31–41	32,229	
September 29	at No. 16 Arizona	Arizona Stadium; Tucson, AZ	Prime	W 30–25	52,731	
October 6	San Jose State*	California Memorial Stadium; Berkeley, CA		W 35–34	35,000	
October 13	at Arizona State	Sun Devil Stadium; Tempe, AZ		W 31–24	59,043	
October 20	UCLA	California Memorial Stadium; Berkeley, CA (rivalry)		W 38–31	50,000	
October 27	at No. 7 Washington	Husky Stadium; Seattle, WA		L 7–46	71,427	
November 3	at No. 21 USC	Los Angeles Memorial Coliseum; Los Angeles, CA	Prime	T 31–31	62,974	
November 10	No. 20 Oregon	California Memorial Stadium; Berkeley, CA		W 28–3	45,000	
November 17	Stanford	California Memorial Stadium; Berkeley, CA (Big Game)		L 25–27	75,662	
December 31	vs. Wyoming*	Arizona Stadium; Tucson, AZ (Copper Bowl)	TBS	W 17–15	36,340	
*Non-conference game; Rankings from AP Poll released prior to the game

== Game summaries ==
=== Miami (FL) ===
#10 Miami (FL) at California

Team	1	2	3	4	Total
• Hurricanes	10	21	0	21	52
Golden Bears	14	7	0	3	24

- Date: September 15
- Location: California Memorial Stadium, Berkeley, CA
- Game attendance: 47,000
- Referee: Gordon Reese
- TV announcers (ABC): Gary Bender and Lynn Swann

Scoring summary
Q1	MIA	Huerta 22 yard field goal	MIA 3–0
Q1	CAL	White 99 yard kickoff return (Keen kick)	CAL 7–3
Q1	MIA	Carroll 20 yard pass from Erickson (Huerta kick)	MIA 10–7
Q1	CAL	White 1 yard run (Keen kick)	CAL 14–10
Q2	MIA	Bethel 7 yard pass from Erickson (Huerta kick)	MIA 17–14
Q2	CAL	Treggs 13 yard pass from Pawlawski (Keen kick)	CAL 21–17
Q2	MIA	Erickson 1 yard run (Huerta kick)	MIA 24–21
Q2	MIA	Hill 4 yard pass from Erickson (Huerta kick)	MIA 31–21
Q4	CAL	Keen 25 yard field goal	MIA 31–24
Q4	MIA	McGuire 1 yard run (Huerta kick)	MIA 38–24
Q4	MIA	Conley 7 yard pass from Erickson (Huerta kick)	MIA 45–24
Q4	MIA	Spencer 38 yard run (Huerta kick)	MIA 52–24
