= Dick Tomey =

American football player and coach (1938–2019)

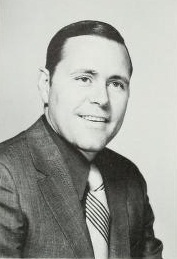
- Tomey circa 1972.

Biographical details
- Born: June 20, 1938; Elnora, Indiana, U.S.
- Died: May 10, 2019 (aged 80); Tucson, Arizona, U.S.

Playing career

Baseball
- 1957–1959: DePauw
- Position: Catcher

Coaching career (HC unless noted)

Football
- 1962–1963: Miami (OH) (GA/freshmen)
- 1964: Northern Illinois (freshmen)
- 1965–1966: Davidson (DB)
- 1967–1970: Kansas (DB)
- 1971–1973: UCLA (OL/DB)
- 1974–1975: UCLA (DB)
- 1976: UCLA (DC)
- 1977–1986: Hawaii
- 1987–2000: Arizona
- 2003: Chicago Bears (assistant)
- 2004: Texas (AHC/DE)
- 2005–2009: San Jose State
- 2011: Hawaii (ST)

Administrative career (AD unless noted)
- 2015–2016: South Florida (associate AD)

Head coaching record
- Overall: 183–145–7
- Bowls: 5–3

Accomplishments and honors

Championships
- 1 Pac-10 (1993)

Awards
- WAC Coach of the Year (1981); Pac-10 Coach of the Year (1992)

Richard Hastings Tomey (June 20, 1938 – May 10, 2019) was an American college football coach and player. Tomey served as the head football coach at the University of Hawaii at Manoa (1977–1986), University of Arizona (1987–2000), and San Jose State University (2005–2009), compiling a career college football record of 183–145–7. His last full-time coaching position was as the special teams coach at Hawaii in 2011 under head coach Greg McMackin, who resigned after the season. Tomey was not retained by McMackin's successor, Norm Chow. Tomey served as a head coach of the victorious West team in the Casino Del Sol College All-Star Game on January 11, 2013, at Kino Stadium in Arizona.

== Coaching career ==
=== Early positions ===
Tomey is a 1960 graduate of DePauw University. At DePauw, Tomey earned three varsity letters on the DePauw Tigers baseball team at catcher from 1957 to 1959.

He began his college football coaching career as graduate assistant and freshman coach at Miami University under John Pont in 1962, then under Bo Schembechler in 1963. In 1964, Tomey became freshman coach at Northern Illinois under Howard Fletcher. From 1965 to 1966, Tomey coached defensive backs at Davidson College under Homer Smith. He then coached the same position at Kansas from 1967 to 1970 under Pepper Rodgers, then followed Rodgers to UCLA in 1971. From 1971 to 1973, Tomey was both offensive line and defensive backs coach under Rodgers. When Dick Vermeil became head coach in 1974, Tomey coached only the defensive backs. In 1976, new UCLA head coach Terry Donahue promoted Tomey to defensive coordinator. During Tomey's time as assistant, UCLA won the 1976 Rose Bowl following the 1975 season.

=== Hawaii (head coach) ===
From 1977 to 1986, Tomey led his teams at Hawaii to their first in season top-20 Associated Press ranking in 1981, and their first AP first-team All-American player, Al Noga. In 1981, he also earned Western Athletic Conference "Coach of the Year" honors. He left as the winningest coach in Hawaii history, but was passed by June Jones during the 2006 season.

=== Arizona ===
In 1987, Tomey became head coach at Arizona, earning Pac-10 "Coach of the Year" honors in 1992. During his tenure, he coached five future NFL first-round draft choices, 20 All-Americans, and 43 Pac-10 first team players. His best teams were in the mid-1990s, highlighted by a tenacious "Desert Swarm" defense. He led Arizona to two of four ten-win seasons in school history, highlighted by a 12–1 campaign in 1998, in which they finished fourth in both major polls, the highest ranking in school history. The Wildcats were drubbed in the 1999 season opener against Penn State and won just six games that year; Tomey resigned after the 2000 season. The school president and athletic director represented Tomey's "nominal resignation was in lieu of termination by the university," but clarified in 2019 after Tomey's death that the threatened termination was a ruse to pass $600,000 to Tomey as a show of gratitude, as he would not be contractually entitled to it if he resigned. His 95 wins are the most in Wildcats history.

=== San Francisco 49ers and Texas ===
In 2003, he was an assistant defensive coach for the San Francisco 49ers specializing in the nickel defense. In 2004, he helped lead the Texas Longhorns to an 11–1 season and victory in their first-ever Rose Bowl as assistant head coach and defensive ends coach.

=== San Jose State ===
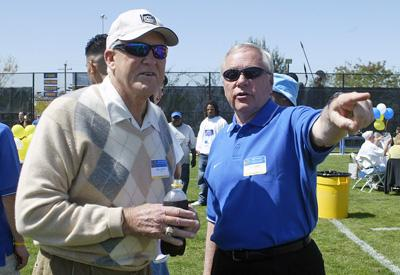
Tomey (right) with Bill Walsh circa 2007.

On December 29, 2004, San Jose State University hired Tomey as head football coach. Despite a 3–8 record in his inaugural season, the Spartans posted a 3–2 record at home, their first winning record since the 2000 season, although one of these wins came against a Division I-AA team. Also, the Spartans were the Division I-A leader in improved attendance. They were one of 11 teams to allow 100 fewer points from the previous year. Three of their losses were by only one touchdown and one of those came against the 2005 WAC co-champion, Nevada. Finally, the Spartans closed out their season with back-to-back wins for the first time since 1997. This two-game winning streak ended during the 2006 season opener, when they lost to Washington.

In 2006, the Spartans finished their regular season 8–4, and participated in the inaugural New Mexico Bowl against New Mexico. San Jose State won the game 20–12 on December 23, 2006, and finished with a 9–4 overall record.

In 2009, members of the American Football Coaches Association elected Tomey as president. On November 16, 2009, Tomey announced he would be retiring at season's end. Tomey finished his final season as the Spartans head coach with a 2–10 record in 2009, bringing his head coaching record to 25–35 at San Jose State and 183–145–7 overall in college football.

=== Hawaii (special teams) ===
Tomey returned to Hawaii to be special teams coach under Greg McMackin for the 2011 season.

== Broadcasting career ==
As of September 9, 2010, the WAC Sports Network—the Western Athletic Conference and its multimedia rights partner, Learfield Sports—appointed seven members to the WSN broadcast team, one of which was Tomey as a color commentator for the network.

Tomey was also a color commentator for KFVE-Hawaii Sports from 2000 to 2003, and for Spectrum Sports Hawaii in 2013.

== Administrative career ==
In February 2015, Tomey joined the University of South Florida as associate athletic director for sports administration. Tomey left his position in April 2016.

== Personal life ==
Born in Bloomington, Indiana, Tomey grew up in Michigan City, Indiana and graduated from Michigan City High School in 1956.

In 2017, Tomey's memoir, Rise of the Rainbow Warriors: Ten Unforgettable Years of University of Hawaii Football, co-written with Lance Tominaga, was released by Watermark Publishing of Honolulu.

Tomey's wife, Nanci Kincaid, is a contemporary fiction author. They had five children.

Tomey was diagnosed with lung cancer in January 2019 and died from complications of the disease that May.

== Dick Tomey Legacy Game ==
After Tomey's death in 2019, the near-annual rivalry match between San Jose State University and the University of Hawaii was renamed to the Dick Tomey Legacy Game, the winner of which receiving the Dick Tomey Legacy Trophy.

== Head coaching record ==
Year	Team	Overall	Conference	Standing	Bowl/playoffs	Coaches^{#}	AP^{°}
Hawaii Rainbow Warriors (NCAA Division I/I-A independent) (1977–1978)
1977	Hawaii	5–6					
1978	Hawaii	6–5					
Hawaii Rainbow Warriors (Western Athletic Conference) (1979–1986)
1979	Hawaii	6–5	3–4	T–4th			
1980	Hawaii	8–3	4–3	3rd			
1981	Hawaii	9–2	6–1	2nd			
1982	Hawaii	6–5	4–4	5th			
1983	Hawaii	5–5–1	3–3–1	5th			
1984	Hawaii	7–4	5–2	2nd			
1985	Hawaii	4–6–2	4–3–1	4th			
1986	Hawaii	7–5	4–4	T–4th			
Hawaii:		63–46–3	33–24–2				
Arizona Wildcats (Pacific-10 Conference) (1987–2000)
1987	Arizona	4–4–3	2–3–3	7th			
1988	Arizona	7–4	5–3	T–3rd			
1989	Arizona	8–4	5–3	T–2nd	W Copper		25
1990	Arizona	7–5	5–4	5th	L Aloha		
1991	Arizona	4–7	3–5	T–6th			
1992	Arizona	6–5–1	4–3–1	5th	L John Hancock^{†}		
1993	Arizona	10–2	6–2	T–1st	W Fiesta^{†}	9	10
1994	Arizona	8–4	6–2	T–2nd	L Freedom	20	20
1995	Arizona	6–5	4–4	T–5th			
1996	Arizona	5–6	3–5	T–5th			
1997	Arizona	7–5	4–4	T–5th	W Insight.com		
1998	Arizona	12–1	7–1	2nd	W Holiday	4	4
1999	Arizona	6–6	3–5	T–6th			
2000	Arizona	5–6	3–5	T–5th			
Arizona:		95–64–4	60–49–4				
San Jose State Spartans (Western Athletic Conference) (2005–2009)
2005	San Jose State	3–8	2–6	T–6th			
2006	San Jose State	9–4	5–3	3rd	W New Mexico		
2007	San Jose State	5–7	4–4	T–4th			
2008	San Jose State	6–6	4–4	T–5th			
2009	San Jose State	2–10	1–7	T–8th			
San Jose State:		25–35	16–24				
Total:		183–145–7					
National championship Conference title Conference division title or championship game berth
^{†}Indicates Bowl Coalition bowl.; ^{#}Rankings from final Coaches Poll.; ^{°}Rankings from final AP Poll.
