= 1990 Oregon Ducks football team =

American college football season

1990 Oregon Ducks football

Freedom Bowl, L 31–32 vs. Colorado State
- Conference: Pacific-10 Conference
- Record: 8–4 (4–3 Pac-10)
- Head coach: Rich Brooks (14th season)
- Offensive coordinator: Mike Bellotti (2nd season)
- Offensive scheme: Pro-style
- Defensive coordinator: Denny Schuler (5th season)
- Base defense: 5–2
- Captains: Bill Musgrave; Rory Dairy
- Home stadium: Autzen Stadium

1990 Pacific-10 Conference football standings
	Conf.					Overall
Team	W		L		T	W		L		T
No. 5 Washington $	7	–	1	–	0	10	–	2	–	0
No. 20 USC	5	–	2	–	1	8	–	4	–	1
Oregon	4	–	3	–	0	8	–	4	–	0
California	4	–	3	–	1	7	–	4	–	1
Arizona	5	–	4	–	0	7	–	5	–	0
UCLA	4	–	4	–	0	5	–	6	–	0
Stanford	4	–	4	–	0	5	–	6	–	0
Arizona State	2	–	5	–	0	4	–	7	–	0
Washington State	2	–	6	–	0	3	–	8	–	0
Oregon State	1	–	6	–	0	1	–	10	–	0
$ – Conference champion; Rankings from AP Poll

The 1990 Oregon Ducks football team represented the University of Oregon in the 1990 NCAA Division I-A football season. The Ducks outscored their opponents 341 to 221 points. Led by fourteenth-year head coach Rich Brooks, the Ducks were 8–3 in the regular season (4–3 in Pac-10, third) and competed in the Freedom Bowl.

For the only time since 1935, Northwest foe Washington State was not on the Ducks' schedule (excluding the war years without teams (1943, 1944)).

== Schedule ==
Date	Time	Opponent	Rank	Site	TV	Result	Attendance	Source
September 8	1:00 pm	San Diego State*		Autzen Stadium; Eugene, OR		W 42–21	35,118	
September 15	1:00 pm	Idaho*		Autzen Stadium; Eugene, OR		W 55–23	29,637	
September 22	7:00 pm	at No. 18 Arizona		Arizona Stadium; Tucson, AZ	OSN	L 17–22	53,283	
September 29	12:30 pm	No. 4 BYU*		Autzen Stadium; Eugene, OR	ABC	W 32–16	45,022	
October 6	1:00 pm	Utah State*	No. 22	Autzen Stadium; Eugene, OR		W 52–7	32,554	
October 13	12:30 pm	at No. 17 Washington	No. 19	Husky Stadium; Seattle, WA (rivalry)	ABC	L 17–38	73,498	
October 20	7:00 pm	Arizona State		Autzen Stadium; Eugene, OR	Prime	W 27–7	35,685	
October 27	1:00 pm	Stanford	No. 25	Autzen Stadium; Eugene, OR (rivalry)		W 31–0	37,559	
November 3	1:00 pm	UCLA	No. 22	Autzen Stadium; Eugene, OR		W 28–24	45,901	
November 10	1:00 pm	at California	No. 20	California Memorial Stadium; Berkeley, CA		L 3–28	45,000	
November 17	1:30 pm	at Oregon State		Parker Stadium; Corvallis, OR (Civil War)		W 6–3	35,962	
December 29	5:00 pm	vs. Colorado State*		Anaheim Stadium; Anaheim, CA (Freedom Bowl)	NBC	L 31–32	51,103	
*Non-conference game; Rankings from AP Poll released prior to the game; All times are in Pacific time

== Game summaries ==
=== UCLA ===
Team	1	2	3	4	Total
UCLA	7	10	0	7	24
• Oregon	0	7	3	18	28

- Date: November 3
- Location: Autzen Stadium

Scoring summary
Q1	3:08	UCLA	Miller 13 yard pass from Maddox (Daluiso kick)	UCLA 7–0
Q2	8:16	UCLA	Daluiso 27 yard field goal	UCLA 10–0
Q2	3:50	ORE	Kelemeni 2 yard run (McCallum kick)	UCLA 10
Q2	0:16	UCLA	R. Moore 9 yard pass from Maddox (Daluiso kick)	UCLA 17–7
Q3	9:49	ORE	McCallum 35 yard field goal	UCLA 17–10
Q4	11:41	ORE	McCallum 38 yard field goal	UCLA 17–13
Q4	9:32	UCLA	Miller 62 yard pass from Maddox (Daluiso kick)	UCLA 24–13
Q4	6:10	ORE	Shedrick 2 yard run (Kelemeni run)	UCLA 24–21
Q4	2:01	ORE	Ferry 16 yard pass from Musgrave (McCallum kick)	ORE 28–24

=== Oregon State ===
Team	1	2	3	4	Total
• Oregon	3	0	3	0	6
Oregon State	3	0	0	0	3

- Date: November 17
- Location: Parker Stadium, Corvallis, Oregon
- Game attendance: 35,962

Scoring summary
1	10:31	ORE	McCallum 43-yard field goal	ORE 3-0
1	7:09	OSU	Burke 33-yard field goal	Tied 3-3
3	8:26	ORE	McCallum 28-yard field goal	ORE 6-3

== Roster ==
1990 Oregon Ducks football team roster
Players
Coaches
Offense

Pos.	#	Name	Class
WR	81	Ronnie Harris	Fr
QB	14	Bill Musgrave	Sr
TE	83	Jeff Thomason	Jr

Defense

Pos.	#	Name	Class
DE	90	Matt LaBounty	Jr

Special teams

Pos.	#	Name	Class

Head coach

- Rich Brooks

Coordinators/assistant coaches

Legend

- (C) Team captain
- (S) Suspended
- (I) Ineligible
- Injured
- Redshirt

== Draft picks ==
The following players were selected in the 1991 NFL draft.

Rnd.	Pick	Team	Player	Pos.	College	Notes
4	106	Dallas Cowboys	Bill Musgrave	QB		
