= 1990 Arizona Wildcats football team =

American college football season

1990 Arizona Wildcats football

Aloha Bowl, L 0–28 vs. Syracuse
- Conference: Pacific-10 Conference
- Record: 7–5 (5–4 Pac-10)
- Head coach: Dick Tomey (4th season)
- Offensive coordinator: Rip Scherer (2nd season)
- Defensive coordinator: Larry Mac Duff (4th season)
- Home stadium: Arizona Stadium

1990 Pacific-10 Conference football standings
	Conf.					Overall
Team	W		L		T	W		L		T
No. 5 Washington $	7	–	1	–	0	10	–	2	–	0
No. 20 USC	5	–	2	–	1	8	–	4	–	1
Oregon	4	–	3	–	0	8	–	4	–	0
California	4	–	3	–	1	7	–	4	–	1
Arizona	5	–	4	–	0	7	–	5	–	0
UCLA	4	–	4	–	0	5	–	6	–	0
Stanford	4	–	4	–	0	5	–	6	–	0
Arizona State	2	–	5	–	0	4	–	7	–	0
Washington State	2	–	6	–	0	3	–	8	–	0
Oregon State	1	–	6	–	0	1	–	10	–	0
$ – Conference champion; Rankings from AP Poll

The 1990 Arizona Wildcats football team represented the University of Arizona in the Pacific-10 Conference (Pac-10) during the 1990 NCAA Division I-A football season. In their fourth season under head coach Dick Tomey, the Wildcats compiled a 7–5 record (5–4 against Pac-10 opponents), finished in fifth place in the Pac-10, were shut out in the 1990 Aloha Bowl by Syracuse, and were outscored by their opponents, 311 to 267. The team played its home games in Arizona Stadium in Tucson, Arizona.

The team's statistical leaders included George Malauulu with 726 passing yards, Art Greathouse with 482 rushing yards, and Terry Vaughn with 431 receiving yards. Safety Jeff Hammerschmidt led the team with 78 tackles. Cornerback Darryll Lewis intercepted seven passes and returned two of them for touchdowns.

Arizona played all nine other Pac-10 schools in the season for the first time since they joined the conference in 1978. This feat would not be accomplished again until 2006. Also, the Wildcats only had four passing touchdowns all season, as most of their offensive touchdowns were on rushing plays (the team's offensive scheme at the time was a wishbone offense, which was mostly an option attack).

== Schedule ==
Date	Time	Opponent	Rank	Site	TV	Result	Attendance	Source
September 8	7:00 p.m.	No. 11 Illinois*		Arizona Stadium; Tucson, AZ	Prime	W 28–16	53,330	
September 15	7:00 p.m.	at New Mexico*	No. 20	University Stadium; Albuquerque, NM (rivalry)	TBS	W 25–10	23,037	
September 22	7:00 p.m.	Oregon	No. 18	Arizona Stadium; Tucson, AZ	KMSB	W 22–17	53,283	
September 29	4:00 p.m.	California	No. 16	Arizona Stadium; Tucson, AZ	Prime	L 25–30	52,731	
October 6	12:30 p.m.	at UCLA	No. 25	Rose Bowl; Pasadena, CA	ABC	W 28–21	50,156	
October 13	7:30 p.m.	at Oregon State	No. 21	Parker Stadium; Corvallis, OR	Prime	L 21–35	21,653	
October 20	1:00 p.m.	at No. 15 USC		Los Angeles Memorial Coliseum; Los Angeles, CA	Prime	W 35–26	68,212	
October 27	7:00 p.m.	Washington State	No. 23	Arizona Stadium; Tucson, AZ	KTTU	W 42–34	55,520	
November 3	1:30 p.m.	at No. 7 Washington	No. 23	Husky Stadium; Seattle, WA	ABC	L 10–54	70,111	
November 10	7:30 p.m.	Stanford^{†}		Arizona Stadium; Tucson, AZ	Prime	L 10–23	52,609	
November 24	4:00 p.m.	Arizona State		Arizona Stadium; Tucson, AZ (rivalry)	Prime	W 21–17	57,112	
December 25	3:00 p.m.	vs. Syracuse*		Aloha Stadium; Halawa, HI (Aloha Bowl)	ABC	L 0–28	14,185	
*Non-conference game; ^{†}Homecoming; Rankings from AP Poll released prior to the game; All times are in Mountain time

== Before the season ==
Arizona concluded the 1989 season with a 8–4 record and a victory over NC State in the Copper Bowl that was held at their home field. The season ended a decade of resurgence for the football program and entered 1990 with hopes of continuing its winning ways. The Wildcats were ranked 23rd at the start of the preseason

Beginning this season, the Wildcats' helmets featured the school's "Block 'A'" logo, which is still in use as of today. The logo resembled Arizona’s growing stance as a university, and the previous logo, a red "A", continued to be seen on the top of Arizona Stadium scoreboard until the end of the 1992 season.

== Game summaries ==
=== Illinois ===
Arizona began the new decade at home with a showdown against 11th-ranked Illinois. The defense held the Illini in check to earn a big victory.

=== New Mexico ===
Arizona traveled to Albuquerque and to visit old rival New Mexico. The Wildcats would outplay the Lobos yet again with a big second half to earn the victory.

This was the final time that the Kit Carson Rifle was awarded, as it been theorized that using a rifle as a rivalry trophy advocates violence at that the rifle itself may have used to target Native Americans. As a result, the rifle was retired when the Wildcats and Lobos next met in the Insight Bowl in 1997. The rifle currently resides in Tucson at Arizona's football facilities. A small wooden replica of the rifle is on display at New Mexico's campus in Albuquerque.

=== Oregon ===
The Wildcats faced Oregon at home in their Pac-10 opener. Arizona's defense stymied the Ducks’ offense for most of the game. Wildcat cornerback Darryll Lewis had a pair of interceptions, with one returned for a touchdown. Oregon had a chance to win on the game's final play, but the Wildcats stopped them at the goal line to hold on for the victory.

=== UCLA ===
Against UCLA at the Rose Bowl, both the Wildcats and Bruins went in a back and forth battle before Lewis intercepted a UCLA pass and returned it for yet another touchdown to give Arizona the lead late in the fourth quarter. UCLA missed a chance for a tie or win after appearing to score a touchdown as time expired, but was penalized due to their quarterback crossing the line of scrimmage while he threw the ball toward the end zone, and the Wildcats escaped with the win.

=== Oregon State ===
After narrowly edging UCLA, Arizona stayed on the road and went to Corvallis to face Oregon State. The Beavers, who were winless entering the game, pulled of an unlikely upset of the Wildcats. The loss to the Beavers turned out to be Oregon State's only win of the season.

=== USC ===
The Wildcats returned to southern California and took on 15th-ranked USC, who was led by former Arizona coach Larry Smith, who Tomey succeeded as Arizona coach in 1987. Both teams would battle back and forth early on in the game. Later, a memorable moment occurred when Arizona used a trick play on offense and nearly scored a touchdown on it (the play, known as a “Fumblerooski”, was later outlawed by the NCAA in 1993). Nevertheless, the Wildcats put up enough points on the board to hold off the Trojans on its way to an upset win and Tomey finally defeated Smith in his fourth try.

This was the first time that Tomey defeated his predecessor and was also only Arizona's second ever win over USC and first since 1981 (when, coincidentally, Smith was the Arizona coach). It was also the first time in program history that Arizona defeated USC and UCLA in the same season (both occurring on the road).

=== Washington ===
On the road in Seattle, Arizona visited seventh-ranked Washington. The Wildcats did not have a chance against the Huskies’ dominant offense, and gave up over 50 points in an ugly defeat. Washington went on to ultimately win both the Pac-10 title and Rose Bowl.

=== Arizona State ===
In the annual “Duel in the Desert”, the Wildcats met Arizona State and looked to continue their reign of dominance in the rivalry. Early in the game, the Sun Devils attempted a punt in which the ball sailed over the punter's head and Arizona recovered it in the end zone for a touchdown. ASU recovered afterwards and led 17–14 after three quarters.

In the fourth, the Wildcats forced another turnover and regained the lead at 21–17 on a rushing touchdown by tailback Arthur Greathouse. With the game going down to the wire, ASU threatened to take the lead in the final minute trailing 21–17. However, the Wildcats intercepted a pass near the goal line to seal the win and gave the Devils another yet painful loss in the rivalry. The victory also saved their unbeaten streak over ASU dating back to 1982 and was bowl-eligible with their seventh win. Arizona capitalized on several ASU mistakes which led to the win.

=== Syracuse (Aloha Bowl) ===
Arizona traveled to Hawaii for the Aloha Bowl against Syracuse that was played on Christmas Day. Tomey returned to Honolulu for the first time since 1986, when he was the Hawaii coach before being hired at Arizona in 1987. In the bowl game, the Wildcats had no answer against Syracuse's blitzing defense and the Orangemen's offense put up four touchdowns to pull away and earned a shutout. Arizona ended the season with a 7–5 record. Syracuse is now known as the Orange.

== Awards and honors ==
- Darryll Lewis, CB, Pac-10 co-defensive player of the year, Jim Thorpe Award winner, Consensus and AP All-American, First-team all-Pac-10

== Season notes ==
- This was the first season in which Arizona played all other teams from the Pac-10 due to conference scheduling, and was the only team to do so. It would be another sixteen years before the Wildcats put all of the conference teams on their season schedule again.
- This season was also the first in which Arizona wore helmets with the newer “Block ‘A’” logo on it. The logo was first designed in 1987 and unveiled in 1989 and alternated with the older “A” logo (a large “A” in red) during the previous season. The new “A” appeared at midfield at Arizona Stadium in 1989 and became the official logo in this year and continues to be used on the helmets to this day. In addition to the “A” logo, the helmets also featured a red and blue stripe on top. The helmets would be worn until the end of the 2003 season.
- This was the first season that local Tucson television stations KMSB and KTTU aired selected Arizona football and basketball games (both live and replays on tape-delays). KMSB, which would become sister stations with KTTU in 1991, had broadcast Wildcat sports since the late 1960s/early 1970s. Both stations shared broadcasting rights until the end of the 1994 basketball season, when KTTU would become the full-time home for locally-aired Arizona games until 2000.
- Arizona played Illinois for the first time in school history.
- To date, this is Arizona’s most recent win over New Mexico in the regular season. The two teams would not meet again until 1997 and did not play in the regular season again until 2007. This was due to the fact that both teams are in different conferences.
- Arizona won against UCLA at the Rose Bowl for the first time ever, as their previous wins against the Bruins happened in Tucson. The team has yet to appear in the actual Rose Bowl game, however.
- The win over USC was the second time that Arizona beat the Trojans, with the first in 1981, both on the road. The Wildcats would defeat them at home for the first time in the following season.
- Arizona defeated both of the Los Angeles teams (UCLA and USC) this season for the first time. They would accomplish this feat only twice since then (1999 and 2009).
- With Arizona's win against Arizona State, it may have saved the Wildcats’ season, as a loss would have kept Arizona out of a bowl game because it would have led to a losing conference record which would have the Wildcats ineligible despite having six wins. Arizona narrowly beat ASU and made it to a bowl.
- The defense, led by cornerback Darryll Lewis, was mostly responsible for keeping the Wildcats close in games and resulted in the seven victories. Lewis’ efforts led to him sharing the Pac-10 defensive player of the year honors and receiving the Thorpe Award for the nation's best cornerback, and became the first Wildcat to win a national college football award.
- After losing the Aloha Bowl, Arizona did not get shut out again until 2009, when Nebraska held the Wildcats scoreless in the Holiday Bowl.
- This was the final season for Arizona offensive coordinator Rip Scherer, who accepted the head coaching position at James Madison in 1991.
