= 1990 Freedom Bowl =

- Freedom Bowl VII
Colorado State Rams	Oregon Ducks
(8–4)	(8–3)
32	31
Head coach: Earle Bruce	Head coach: Rich Brooks
	1	2	3	4	Total
Colorado State	7	7	5	13	32
Oregon	7	10	0	14	31
- Date: December 29, 1990
- Season: 1990
- Stadium: Anaheim Stadium
- Location: Anaheim, California
- Referee: Al Hynes (ECAC)
- Attendance: 41,450

United States TV coverage
- Network: Raycom Sports
- Announcers: Phil Stone and Craig James

The 1990 Freedom Bowl was an American college football bowl game between the Colorado State Rams and the Oregon Ducks.

== Background ==
The Rams had finished second in the Western Athletic Conference to earn a bowl appearance, their first since 1949, in Earle Bruce's second season as head coach. The Ducks finished third in the Pacific-10 Conference in Brooks' 14th year with the Ducks. This was the first time the Ducks made consecutive bowl appearances. This was the first and only Freedom Bowl for both teams.

== Game summary ==
Despite outgaining the Rams by nearly 100 yards, Oregon fell short, with their three fumbles and limited rushing attack not helping their cause. Mike Gimenez ran in for a touchdown midway through the first quarter to give the Rams a 7–0 lead. Anthony Jones caught a touchdown pass from Bill Musgrave to tie the game back up as the first quarter ended soon after. Gregg McCallum gave Oregon a lead on his 23-yard field goal early in the second quarter, but Tony Alford responded nearly four minutes later on a touchdown run. With :23 remaining in the half, Sean Burwell caught a touchdown pass from Musgrave to give Oregon a 17–14 halftime lead. The third quarter proved crucial as the Rams scored five points despite only gaining five yards and no first downs the whole quarter. It started on a muffed punt attempt that was recovered by Oregon in the end zone, resulting in a safety. Mike Brown kicked a field goal late in the third quarter to give the Rams a 19–17 lead as the fourth quarter began not long after. Michael McClellan caught a touchdown pass from Musgrave early in the fourth quarter. The two-point conversion succeeded after Burwell's catch to make it 25–19. Greg Primus caught a 49-yard touchdown pass from Gimenez to give the Rams the lead again. Todd Yert added on to the margin on his 52-yard touchdown run with 4:59 remaining. But Brown's extra point kick was blocked, keeping the score 32–25. The Ducks went on a 79-yard drive with the help of third-down completions of 31 and 21 yards to Joe Reitzug. With 61 seconds remaining, Sean Burwell ran in for a touchdown to narrow the score to 32–31. They decided to go for the win on the two point conversion attempt. Musgrave threw to McClellan, but he fell short of the endzone, as the Rams held on to win the game. Musgrave went 29 for 47 on 392 yards with three touchdowns. McClellan caught 9 of those passes for 148 yards. Yert rushed for 94 yards on 12 carries for the Rams. This was the first ever bowl victory for the Rams.

== Aftermath ==
Both teams did not win another bowl game until 1997, under different coaches.

== Statistics ==
Statistics	Oregon	CSU
First downs	21	16
Yards rushing	7	196
Yards passing	392	108
Total yards	399	304
Punts-Average	3-38.3	6-34.7
Fumbles-Lost	5-3	2-0
Interceptions	0	1
Penalties-Yards	7-60	5-47
