= 1990 Arizona State Sun Devils football team =

American college football season

1990 Arizona State Sun Devils football
- Conference: Pacific-10 Conference
- Record: 4–7 (2–5 Pac-10)
- Head coach: Larry Marmie (3rd season)
- Home stadium: Sun Devil Stadium

1990 Pacific-10 Conference football standings
	Conf.					Overall
Team	W		L		T	W		L		T
No. 5 Washington $	7	–	1	–	0	10	–	2	–	0
No. 20 USC	5	–	2	–	1	8	–	4	–	1
Oregon	4	–	3	–	0	8	–	4	–	0
California	4	–	3	–	1	7	–	4	–	1
Arizona	5	–	4	–	0	7	–	5	–	0
UCLA	4	–	4	–	0	5	–	6	–	0
Stanford	4	–	4	–	0	5	–	6	–	0
Arizona State	2	–	5	–	0	4	–	7	–	0
Washington State	2	–	6	–	0	3	–	8	–	0
Oregon State	1	–	6	–	0	1	–	10	–	0
$ – Conference champion; Rankings from AP Poll

The 1990 Arizona State Sun Devils football team was an American football team that represented Arizona State University as a member of the Pacific-10 Conference (Pac-10) during the 1990 NCAA Division I-A football season. In their third season under head coach Larry Marmie, the Sun Devils compiled a 4–7 record (2–5 against Pac-10 opponents), finished in eighth place in the Pac-10, and were outscored by their opponents by a combined total of 294 to 272.

The team's statistical leaders included Paul Justin with 1,876 passing yards, Leonard Russell with 810 rushing yards, and Eric Guliford with 837 receiving yards.

== Schedule ==
Date	Time	Opponent	Rank	Site	TV	Result	Attendance	Source
September 8	8:30 pm	Baylor*		Sun Devil Stadium; Tempe, AZ		W 34–13	69,617	
September 15		Colorado State*	No. 25	Sun Devil Stadium; Tempe, AZ		W 31–20	61,344	
September 29	12:30 pm	at Missouri*	No. 21	Faurot Field; Columbia, MO		L 9–30	34,825	
October 6	4:00 pm	No. 17 Washington		Sun Devil Stadium; Tempe, AZ		L 14–42	62,738	
October 13		California^{†}		Sun Devil Stadium; Tempe, AZ		L 24–31	59,043	
October 20	7:00 pm	at Oregon		Autzen Stadium; Eugene, OR	Prime	L 7–27	35,685	
October 27	12:30 pm	No. 21 USC		Sun Devil Stadium; Tempe, AZ	ABC	L 6–13	64,715	
November 3	6:00 pm	Oregon State		Sun Devil Stadium; Tempe, AZ		W 34–9	56,325	
November 10	1:00 pm	at Washington State		Martin Stadium; Pullman, WA		W 51–26	20,070	
November 24		at Arizona		Arizona Stadium; Tucson, AZ (rivalry)		L 17–21	57,112	
December 2		vs. No. 11 Houston*		Tokyo Dome; Tokyo, Japan (Coca-Cola Classic)	TBS	L 45–62	50,000	
*Non-conference game; ^{†}Homecoming; Rankings from AP Poll released prior to the game; All times are in Mountain time

== Game summaries ==
=== Oregon State ===
Oregon State at Arizona State

Team	1	2	3	4	Total
Beavers	0	6	3	0	9
• Sun Devils	0	10	10	14	34

- Date: November 3
- Location: Sun Devil Stadium
- Game attendance: 56,325

Scoring summary
Q2	OSU	Burke 33 yard field goal	OSU 3–0
Q2	ASU	Guliford 10 yard pass from Justin (Richey kick)	ASU 7–3
Q2	OSU	Burke 19 yard field goal	ASU 7–6
Q2	ASU	Rausch 50 yard field goal	ASU 10–6
Q3	ASU	Richey 23 yard field goal	ASU 13–6
Q3	ASU	Fisher 16 yard run (Richey kick)	ASU 20–6
Q3	OSU	Burke 31 yard field goal	ASU 20–9
Q4	ASU	LaDuke 95 yard interception return (Richey kick)	ASU 27–9
Q4	ASU	Fisher 5 yard run (Richey kick)	ASU 34–9

- ASU assistant Frank Falks collapsed after the game and was taken to the hospital but later released.

=== Vs. Houston ===
The Sun Devils lost a high-scoring matchup in Tokyo — a game where the two teams combined for 1,445 yards of total offense (1,190 yards passing). Houston's David Klingler set the Division I-A single-game passing record with 716 yards.

== Roster ==
1990 Arizona State Sun Devils football team roster
Players
Coaches
Offense

Pos.	#	Name	Class
WR	12	Eric Guliford	So
QB	10	Paul Justin	Sr
RB	42	Leonard Russell	Jr

Defense

Pos.	#	Name	Class
DE	98	Shante Carver	Fr
S	24	Floyd Fields	Sr
S	29	Nathan LaDuke	Sr
CB	4	Lenny McGill	Fr
CB	1	Phillippi Sparks	Jr
LB	44	Brett Wallerstedt	So
OLB	6	Darren Woodson	Jr

Special teams

Pos.	#	Name	Class

Head coach

- Larry Marmie

Coordinators/assistant coaches

Legend

- (C) Team captain
- (S) Suspended
- (I) Ineligible
- Injured
- Redshirt
