= 1990 Aloha Bowl =

American college football game

1990 Jeep Eagle Aloha Bowl
Syracuse Orangemen	Arizona Wildcats
(6–4–2)	(7–4)
28	0
Head coach: Dick MacPherson	Head coach: Dick Tomey
	1	2	3	4	Total
Syracuse	7	7	0	14	28
Arizona	0	0	0	0	0
- Date: December 25, 1990
- Season: 1990
- Stadium: Aloha Stadium
- Location: Honolulu, Hawaii
- MVP: QB Marvin Graves (Syracuse)
- Attendance: 14,185

United States TV coverage
- Network: ABC
- Announcers: Keith Jackson, Bob Griese

The 1990 Aloha Bowl matched the Arizona Wildcats and the Syracuse Orangemen in their final games of the season.

== Background ==
Syracuse was in their last season as an Independent and last under MacPherson. They went 0-2-2 against teams ranked, but were still in this game due to being 6–2 in other games. This was their fifth bowl game in six seasons and only Aloha Bowl. Arizona finished 5th in the Pac-10, and were playing their 2nd ever Aloha Bowl and 2nd consecutive bowl game.

== Game summary ==
Led by a defense that accounted for four sacks and two interceptions, Syracuse also used their offense to carry their team to another bowl win. Marvin Graves scored on SU's first possession after a 6:25 drive on a running touchdown. Terry Richardson caught a touchdown pass from Graves in the second quarter to make it 14–0 at halftime. After a scoreless 3rd quarter, Syracuse sealed the game with a 90-yard drive culminating in a Chris Gedney touchdown catch from Graves. A Graves touchdown run later on was icing on the cake, from a quarterback who went 10 of 19 for 145 yards passing and 45 yards rushing on 11 rushes for 3 total touchdowns.

== Aftermath ==
Neither team has returned to Hawaii since this game. Syracuse would not lose another bowl game until 1997. Arizona would not win a bowl game until 1994.

== Statistics ==
Statistics	Syracuse	Arizona
First downs	20	14
Yards rushing	207	149
Yards passing	145	77
Total yards	352	226
Punts-Average	3-40	7-31.7
Fumbles-Lost	1-0	0-0
Interceptions	0	2
Penalties-Yards	3-20	5-40
