= Alai Kalaniuvalu =

American football player (born 1971)

No. 54
- Position: Guard

Personal information
- Born: October 23, 1971 (age 55); Honolulu, Hawaii, U.S.
- Listed height: 6 ft 3 in (1.91 m)
- Listed weight: 302 lb (137 kg)

Career information
- High school: Franklin (Seattle, Washington}
- College: Oregon State
- NFL draft: 1994: 3rd round, 99th overall pick

Career history
- Atlanta Falcons (1994)*; Green Bay Packers (1994); Washington Redskins (1994-1995); Philadelphia Eagles (1995)*; Denver Broncos (1996); Dallas Cowboys (1997)*
- * Offseason or practice squad member only

Alai Kalaniuvalu (born October 23, 1971) is an American former professional football player who was a guard in the National Football League (NFL) for the Atlanta Falcons, Washington Redskins, Philadelphia Eagles, and the Denver Broncos.

He played college football at Oregon State University and was selected in the third round of the 1994 NFL draft by the Atlanta Falcons. Kalaniuvalu attended Kaimuki High School in Honolulu, Hawaii before moving to Seattle, Washington where he attended Franklin High where he was a two-time All Metro League selection. He attended Walla Walla CC (WA) before transferring to Oregon State.

Kalaniuvalu attended summer camp with the Atlanta Falcons in 1994 and was released before the start of the regular season. He was then claimed by the Washington Redskins and placed on injured reserve. Later in the season, he was claimed off waivers from the Redskins by the Green Bay Packers and was placed on their practice squad.
