= Kevin Smith (tight end) =

American football player (born 1969)

No. 39, 83, 49
- Position: Tight end

Personal information
- Born: July 25, 1969 (age 57); Bakersfield, California, U.S.
- Listed height: 6 ft 4 in (1.93 m)
- Listed weight: 265 lb (120 kg)

Career information
- High school: Skyline (Oakland, California)
- College: UCLA
- NFL draft: 1992: 7th round, 185th overall pick

Career history
- Los Angeles Raiders (1992–1994); Green Bay Packers (1995–1996); Oakland Raiders (1997)*
- * Offseason or practice squad member only

Awards and highlights
- Super Bowl champion (XXXI)

Career NFL statistics
- Rushing yards: 2
- Rushing average: 2
- Receptions: 1
- Receiving yards: 8
- Stats at Pro Football Reference

Kevin Linn Smith (born July 25, 1969) is an American former professional football player who was a tight end in the National Football League (NFL). Smith spent three seasons with the Los Angeles Raiders. After a year away from the NFL, he joined the Green Bay Packers for the 1996 NFL season. As such, he was a member of the Super Bowl XXXI champion Packers.

He played college football for the UCLA Bruins and attended Skyline High School in Oakland, California.

Pre-draft measurables
Height	Weight	Arm length	Hand span	40-yard dash	10-yard split	20-yard split	20-yard shuttle	Vertical jump	Broad jump	Bench press
6 ft 3 5/8 in (1.92 m)	262 lb (119 kg)	34 1/8 in (0.87 m)	8 7/8 in (0.23 m)	4.79 s	1.73 s	2.78 s	4.44 s	32.0 in (0.81 m)	9 ft 5 in (2.87 m)	21 reps
All values from NFL Combine

== Personal life ==
He is the son of former NFL running back Charlie Smith.
