= Mazio Royster =

American football player (born 1970)

No. 33, 31
- Position: Running back

Personal information
- Born: August 3, 1970 (age 56); Pomona, California, U.S.
- Listed height: 6 ft 1 in (1.85 m)
- Listed weight: 200 lb (91 kg)

Career information
- High school: Bishop Amat Memorial (La Puente, California)
- College: USC
- NFL draft: 1992: 11th round, 284th overall pick
- Expansion draft: 1995: 17th round, 33rd overall pick

Career history
- Tampa Bay Buccaneers (1992–1994); Jacksonville Jaguars (1995)*; Scottish Claymores (1997)
- * Offseason or practice squad member only

Career NFL statistics
- Rushing yards: 122
- Rushing average: 2.9
- Receptions: 13
- Receiving yards: 62
- Total touchdowns: 1
- Stats at Pro Football Reference

Mazio Denmar Vesey Royster (born August 3, 1970) is an American former professional football player who was selected by the Tampa Bay Buccaneers in the eleventh round of the 1992 NFL draft with the 284th overall pick. A running back from the University of Southern California, Royster played in four National Football League (NFL) seasons from 1992 to 1996 for the Buccaneers and Jacksonville Jaguars.

Pre-draft measurables
Height	Weight	Arm length	Hand span	40-yard dash	10-yard split	20-yard split	20-yard shuttle	Vertical jump	Broad jump	Bench press
6 ft 0 1/8 in (1.83 m)	202 lb (92 kg)	32 5/8 in (0.83 m)	9 3/4 in (0.25 m)	4.77 s	1.64 s	2.73 s	4.10 s	32.5 in (0.83 m)	9 ft 5 in (2.87 m)	10 reps

Royster is currently a sports coordinator for movies, television shows, and commercials.
