= Gary Wellman =

American football player (born 1967)

No. 88
- Position: Wide receiver

Personal information
- Born: August 9, 1967 (age 59); Syracuse, New York, U.S.
- Listed height: 5 ft 9 in (1.75 m)
- Listed weight: 170 lb (77 kg)

Career information
- High school: Westlake (Thousand Oaks, California)
- College: USC
- NFL draft: 1991: 5th round, 129th overall pick

Career history
- Houston Oilers (1991–1994)

Awards and highlights
- First-team All-Pac-10 (1990)

Career NFL statistics
- Receptions: 41
- Receiving yards: 542
- Touchdowns: 1
- Stats at Pro Football Reference

Gary James Wellman (born August 9, 1967) is an American former professional football player who was a wide receiver in the National Football League (NFL). He was selected in the fifth round of the 1991 NFL draft by the Houston Oilers with the 129th overall pick. Wellman played college football for the USC Trojans, catching 110 passes for 1,819 yards and 13 touchdowns. As a senior, Wellman was the PAC-10's top receiver with 66 receptions for 1,015 yards and 5 scores. He played three seasons for the Houston Oilers. He played little during his first and last season, but caught 31 passes in his second year when thrust into the starting line-up to replace the injured Webster Slaughter. He also caught 6 passes for 80 yards in their playoff loss to the Kansas City Chiefs.
