= Todd Marinovich =

American gridiron football player (born 1969)

No. 12, 19
- Position: Quarterback

Personal information
- Born: July 4, 1969 (age 57); San Leandro, California, U.S.
- Listed height: 6 ft 4 in (1.93 m)
- Listed weight: 220 lb (100 kg)

Career information
- High school: Capistrano Valley (Mission Viejo, California)
- College: USC (1988–1990)
- NFL draft: 1991: 1st round, 24th overall pick

Career history

Playing
- Los Angeles Raiders (1991–1992); Winnipeg Blue Bombers (1994)*; BC Lions (1999); Los Angeles Avengers (2000–2001)
- * Offseason or practice squad member only

Coaching
- San Diego Strike Force (2019) Quarterbacks coach

Awards and highlights
- AFL All-Rookie Team (2000); First-team All-Pac-10 (1989)

Career NFL statistics
- Passing attempts: 205
- Passing completions: 104
- Completion percentage: 50.7%
- TD–INT: 8–9
- Passing yards: 1,345
- Passer rating: 66.4
- Stats at Pro Football Reference

Career AFL statistics
- TD-INT: 62–21
- Passing yards: 3,214
- Passer rating: 88.72
- Stats at ArenaFan.com

Todd Marvin Marinovich (born Marvin Scott Marinovich; July 4, 1969) is an American former professional football player who was a quarterback in the National Football League (NFL) (Los Angeles Raiders), Canadian Football League (CFL) (Winnipeg Blue Bombers, BC Lions), and Arena Football League (AFL) (Los Angeles Avengers). He played college football for the USC Trojans. Marinovich is known for the well-documented, intense focus of his training as a young athlete and his brief career as a professional, cut short primarily because of his addiction to drugs.

Todd's memoir, Marinovich: Outside the Lines in Football, Art, and Addiction, written with author Lizzy Wright, released in August 2025.

== Early development ==
Marinovich grew up on the Balboa Peninsula of Newport Beach, California. His father, Marv Marinovich, had been a defensive end and a captain for the USC Trojans during the 1962 national championship season and played in the 1963 Rose Bowl. Marinovich's mother, Trudi (née Fertig), was a high school swimmer who dropped out of USC to marry Marv. Her brother Craig was a star USC quarterback at this time.

After harming his own National Football League career by overtraining and focusing too much on weight and bulk, Marv studied Eastern Bloc training methods and was hired by Oakland Raiders owner Al Davis as the NFL's first strength and conditioning coach. Marv later opened his own athletic research center and applied the techniques to his young son, introducing athletic training before Marinovich could leave the crib and continuing it throughout his childhood and adolescence.

Marv saw an opportunity to use techniques, focusing on speed and flexibility, that later formed the basis for modern core training. During her pregnancy, Trudi used no salt, sugar, alcohol, or tobacco; as a baby, Todd was fed only fresh vegetables, fruits, and raw milk. Marv Marinovich commented, "Some guys think the most important thing in life is their jobs, the stock market, whatever. To me, it was my kids. The question I asked myself was, How well could a kid develop if you provided him with the perfect environment?"

== High school career ==
Marinovich had a very successful high school career, becoming the first freshman to start a varsity high school football game in Orange County. He began his career at Mater Dei High School, a large Catholic high school in Santa Ana, alma mater of quarterbacks such as Matt Barkley, and Heisman Trophy winners Matt Leinart, John Huarte, and Bryce Young. Despite throwing for nearly 4,400 yards and 34 touchdowns in his two years at Mater Dei, Marinovich transferred to Mission Viejo's Capistrano Valley High School due to his parents' divorce. Once there, Marinovich broke the all-time Orange County passing record and later the national high school record by passing for 9,914 yards, including 2,477 his senior year. He received numerous honors, including being named a Parade All-American, the National High School Coaches Association's offensive player of the year, the Dial Award for the national high school scholar-athlete of the year in 1987, and the Touchdown Club's national high school player of the year.

=== National attention ===
Marinovich's unique development led to growing media attention. In January 1988, he appeared on the cover of California magazine with the headline "Robo QB: The Making of a Perfect Athlete." The popular media applied the Robo Quarterback label to Marinovich for years afterwards, even after his training and life became much less regimented. In February Sports Illustrated published an article, titled "Bred To Be A Superstar", that discussed his unique upbringing under his father who wanted to turn his son into the "perfect quarterback". The article declared Marinovich "America's first test-tube athlete", and discussed how his mother encouraged his interest in art, music, and classical Hollywood cinema while banning cartoons as too violent. His father assembled a team of advisers to tutor him on every facet of the game. The article stated that:

He has never eaten a Big Mac or an Oreo or a Ding Dong. When he went to birthday parties as a kid, he would take his own cake and ice cream to avoid sugar and refined white flour. He would eat homemade catsup, prepared with honey. He did consume beef but not the kind injected with hormones. He ate only unprocessed dairy products. He teethed on frozen kidney and liver. When Todd was one month old, Marv was already working on his son's physical conditioning. He stretched his hamstrings. Pushups were next. Marv invented a game in which Todd would try to lift a medicine ball onto a kitchen counter. Marv also put him on a balance beam. Both activities grew easier when Todd learned to walk. There was a football in Todd's crib from day one. "Not a real NFL ball," says Marv. "That would be sick; it was a stuffed ball."

Long after Marinovich's professional career had ended, an ESPN columnist named the elder Marinovich one of history's "worst sports fathers". Regardless, the Sports Illustrated article was incorrect about his son's self-control. During high school, he started drinking in after-game parties and smoked marijuana daily. His use of marijuana grew to the point that he would meet with a group of friends—athletes, skaters, surfers, and musicians—every day before school to share a bong before classes in what they nicknamed "Zero Period". Having previously dealt with social anxiety, Marinovich found marijuana relaxed him and did not affect him later during sporting events. The rumors of his use spread to opposing fans, however, who taunted him with chants of "Marijuana-vich" during basketball. His parents divorced around the time he transferred high schools, and he lived in a small apartment with his father for his final two high school seasons. Marinovich enjoyed the period, noting: "Probably the best part of my childhood was me and Marv's relationship my junior and senior years. After the divorce, he really loosened up. It was a bachelor pad. We were both dating."

Almost every major college program recruited Marinovich who, as a high school freshman, began getting letters from Stanford. Despite the family connections to USC he was uncertain whether he fit the program's offense. After a positive visit, however, Marinovich chose the university over recent national champions BYU and Miami, as well as Arizona State, Stanford, and Washington. Marinovich took his college selection seriously, noting: "This is the biggest decision of my life. It means not only where I will play football, but most likely, who I will marry, who my best friends for life will be, and where I will live. It means everything. And the one thing I know for sure is I'm too young to make this kind of decision by myself."

== College career ==
I don't want to be Todd Marinovich.

— Marinovich, during his first year at USC

Marinovich entered USC as a Fine Arts major and redshirted the 1988 season behind Rodney Peete. Already under intense pressure as a high school prospect, the combination of high expectation and the many new temptations that were prohibited under his strict upbringing soon overwhelmed him. He was torn between embracing the freedom and following his father's teachings, noting that "I'm finally away from my dad telling me everything to do. And I've got to say I have taken advantage of it. Full advantage. He keeps telling me, 'Come on, you've got the rest of your life to fool around. Not now.' I know he's right. But there are a lot of distractions at SC." At one point Marinovich left school in his freshman year to see his mother, stating "I wish I could go somewhere else and be someone else. I don't want to be Todd Marinovich."

Outside of his personal travails, Marinovich's football career for USC had an abrupt start. As a redshirt freshman in 1989, he was backup to Pat O'Hara after an unimpressive spring practice; in the fall preseason, however, O'Hara suffered a serious leg injury. Although neither his coaches nor teammates believed that he was ready, Marinovich became the first freshman quarterback to start the first game of the season for USC since World War II. After an upset loss to Illinois in part due to a coaching decision to minimize his role, Marinovich improved; he completed 197 of 321 passes during the regular season for 16 touchdowns and 12 interceptions with a 61.4% completion percentage, 0.1% behind Bernie Kosar's NCAA freshman record. Against Washington State, Marinovich led a last-minute comeback that became known as "The Drive". He led the offense on a 91-yard march downfield with 11 crucial completions, including a touchdown pass and a two-point conversion, that prompted former President Ronald Reagan to call Marinovich to invite him to his home in Los Angeles. The Trojans went 9–2–1, won the Pac-10 Conference, and defeated Michigan in the 1990 Rose Bowl. UPI and Sporting News named Marinovich the College Freshman of the Year for 1989; he was the only freshman on the All-Pac-10 team and the first freshman quarterback named.

Marinovich entered the 1990 season as a Heisman Trophy candidate, with speculation on his leaving school early for the NFL. Head coach Larry Smith set for Marinovich the goal of a 70% pass completion rate. However, his play became erratic due to his personal difficulties. After finding out Marinovich had been skipping numerous classes, Smith suspended him from the Arizona State game, but his play against Arizona had been so poor that he might have been kept out of the game regardless. Smith had a difficult relationship with Marinovich, and the relationship worsened when the quarterback began yelling at the coach on national television during a loss in the 1990 John Hancock Bowl. Marinovich was arrested for cocaine possession a month later, and entered the NFL draft after the season.

== Professional career ==
=== NFL ===
At the 1991 NFL draft the Raiders selected Marinovich in the first round; he was the 24th pick overall and the second quarterback taken—ahead of Brett Favre—signing a three-year, $2.25 million deal. Marinovich made his NFL debut on Monday Night Football, in an exhibition game against the Dallas Cowboys on August 12, 1991. Entering the game with 15 minutes remaining, he moved the Raiders downfield, completing three of four passes for 16 yards and a touchdown. He did not start a game until Jay Schroeder was injured before the final week of the season, where he impressed observers with 23 completions in 40 passes for 243 yards against the Kansas City Chiefs in a close loss. Because of this great debut he started the following week against the Chiefs in the playoffs, but was very poor, throwing for just 140 yards with four interceptions in a 10–6 loss and smashing a locker room mirror with his helmet after the game.

After the Raiders began 0–2 in 1992 with Schroeder as quarterback, Marinovich became the starter. He threw for 395 yards in a loss in his first start that season and lost the following week as the Raiders started 0–4. He then won three of his next four games before losing to the Dallas Cowboys. Marinovich's best game during that span was against the Buffalo Bills on October 11, 1992, in which he completed 11 of 21 passes for 188 yards and two touchdowns in a 20–3 victory. The following week Marinovich started against the Philadelphia Eagles, seeing three of his first 10 passes intercepted. Schroeder regained the starting job and Marinovich never played again in the NFL.

Marinovich had serious substance abuse issues throughout his NFL career. During his rookie season, he increased his partying and drug use beyond marijuana, including taking pharmaceutical amphetamines before games. Because of his college arrest for cocaine possession, the NFL required him to submit to frequent drug tests. Marinovich passed the tests using friends' urine, but after using the urine of a teammate who had been drinking heavily, the test registered a blood alcohol content four times the legal limit and caused the Raiders to force him into rehabilitation. The Raiders held an intervention for him after the season, and Marinovich spent 45 days at a rehab facility. In the 1992 season Marinovich shifted to using LSD after games, because it would not show up on the drug test. His play suffered and his coaches complained he was not grasping the complex offense. He failed his second NFL drug test and went back into rehabilitation. In training camp before the 1993 season, Marinovich failed his third NFL drug test, this time for marijuana, and was suspended for the 1993 season. The Raiders released Marinovich on the final cutdown, choosing not to pay for Marinovich's salary while being suspended in the year before the salary cap would go into effect.

In 1994, once Marinovich's suspension was lifted, the Pittsburgh Steelers showed some interest in signing him to be their third-string quarterback behind Neil O'Donnell and Mike Tomczak. Marinovich, not liking the culture of the NFL, chose not to return to the league. The Steelers ended up turning to the NFL draft instead, drafting Jim Miller.

=== Post-NFL ===
After traveling for two years Marinovich attempted to join the Winnipeg Blue Bombers of the Canadian Football League, but suffered a serious knee injury on the first day of training camp. During recovery, one of his high school friends introduced him to heroin. Soon after, Marinovich was arrested for drug possession and served three months in various jails.

In April 1999, Marinovich was cleared to reenter the NFL but suffered a herniated disk playing recreational basketball. That summer he tried out and received interest from the San Diego Chargers and the Chicago Bears, but failed the physical examination so he signed as a backup quarterback with the BC Lions of the CFL. His use of heroin and cocaine increased and his weight dropped, as he would spend almost all of his free time using drugs. At one point Marinovich severely cut his hand with a crack pipe during halftime and had to covertly bandage himself. Despite being asked to stay with the team for another season, he realized he was in a bad situation and left the team.

Marinovich returned to Los Angeles in 2000 and joined the expansion Los Angeles Avengers of the Arena Football League. Despite undergoing severe heroin withdrawal he had a strong season, tying the record for most touchdowns in a single game by throwing 10 touchdowns against the Houston Thunderbears. Marinovich was named to the all-rookie team, and as the Avengers' franchise player, but the day he received his signing bonus he was arrested for buying heroin. Marinovich's career continued to fall apart, as he was ejected from subsequent games for throwing things at referees, and eventually was suspended from the team in 2001.

Despite flashes of brilliance, Marinovich's professional career is widely considered to be a bust. In 2004 Marinovich was included in ESPN.com's list of The 25 Biggest Sports Flops, coming in at fourth on the ESPN.com editors' list, and seventh on the readers' list.

==== SoCal Coyotes (semi-pro) ====
In 2017, Marinovich agreed to continue his rehabilitation under AAA Hall of Fame head coach J. David Miller of the six-time champion and Palm Springs-based SoCal Coyotes of Development Football International (DFI). After a successful spring coaching the Coyotes' quarterbacks and volunteering with local youth throughout the Coachella Valley, Marinovich made his case to play for the team in a quest to become the oldest starting quarterback in pro football. In a press conference, Miller agreed to stand by his aging player's commitment to sobriety, and signed Marinovich on July 3, 2017. As the signing was primarily to help the quarterback rehabilitate, Miller noted Marinovich's comeback had "very little to do with football."

To learn the intricacies of Miller's run and shoot offense, Marinovich attended mandatory meetings and workouts with the offense's creator Mouse Davis. In Palm Springs, he was tutored by Michael Karls, a record-setting quarterback at Midland University and the Coyotes' second all-time leading passer who agreed to sit in favor of Marinovich despite the age gap. Marinovich also battled with 25-year-old Jacob Russell for the starting job, which the elder quarterback won.

On September 3, 2017, wearing his traditional number 12 that had adorned for the Raiders, a sober 48-year-old Marinovich stepped back into pro football after a 17-year lay-off. He completed 19 for 28 passes for 262 yards, seven touchdowns, and two interceptions as the Coyotes won 73–0 against the California Sharks. In a post-game interview, he noted it was his first game while sober since he was 15 years old. However, eventual shoulder pain led to his immediate withdrawal from action by team physicians. He never played again.

== After football ==
By 2004, Marinovich was unemployed and again living on the Balboa Peninsula; when he was arrested in 2004 for skateboarding in a prohibited area, police found methamphetamines and syringes on him. In May 2005, he was charged with violating probation, but avoided jail by entering an inpatient treatment program. For the next year, Marinovich was in and out of rehab facilities. He was again arrested on August 26, 2007, for possession of drugs and resisting arrest. He was offered a suspended sentence in exchange for regular drug testing, therapy, and meetings with a probation officer. Marinovich began working several part-time jobs, including scraping barnacles off of boats, leading weekly group meetings at a rehab center, painting murals in residential homes, and as a private quarterback coach.

Marinovich still follows USC football and occasionally attends open practices at USC. He has an online art gallery, featuring original works of impressionist-style paintings, drawings and sculptures, many with sports-related themes. Several of his works are featuered at Allegiant Stadium.

ESPN released a documentary film about Marinovich titled The Marinovich Project, which was shown after the Heisman presentation for 2011.

In 2019, Marinovich served as the quarterbacks coach for the San Diego Strike Force of the Indoor Football League.

In August 2025, Marinovich released his award winning memoir Marinovich: Outside the Lines in Football, Art, and Addiction.

== Legal troubles ==
Marinovich has had a number of arrests, many of which have been related to his ongoing drug problems, including nine arrests in Orange County, California, alone. He was arrested in 1991, while still a student at USC, on cocaine possession. In 1997, Marinovich was arrested on suspicion of growing marijuana; he served two months in jail, and a third at a minimum-security facility in Orange County known as the Farm. In April 2000, he was arrested for sexual assault, followed by a 2001 arrest on suspicion of heroin.

In August 2004, he was arrested by Newport Beach police for skateboarding in a prohibited zone. Marinovich was arrested in a public bathroom in Newport Beach, California, in May 2005 after being found with apparent drug paraphernalia; he gave his occupation as "unemployed artist" and "anarchist". Marinovich was ordered to undergo six months of drug rehabilitation followed by six months of outpatient treatment as a result.

In August 2007, Marinovich was arrested and charged with felony drug possession and resisting a police order after being stopped for skateboarding near the Newport Pier boardwalk. On October 30, 2007, he pleaded guilty to felony possession of a small amount of methamphetamine and misdemeanor syringe possession and resisting arrest. Orange County Superior Court Commissioner James Odriozola decided to give Marinovich another chance at rehabilitation and released him to a rehab program in Laguna Beach.

During a period of sobriety from 2007 to 2008, Marinovich worked with National Drug & Alcohol Treatment Centers, located in Newport Beach, California, to help young athletes overcome addiction and to stay clean. In August 2008 after one year of sobriety, Marinovich was hired as a lecturer by Newport Coast Recovery, a drug and alcohol treatment facility in Newport Beach.

On April 4, 2009, he was arrested in Newport Beach after he failed to appear in court for a progress review on his rehabilitation related to his 2007 arrest. He was ordered to be held in jail without bail until his May 4 hearing before the Orange County Superior Court.

On August 22, 2016, he was arrested in Irvine, California after being found naked and in possession of drugs in a neighbor's backyard. Authorities say a naked Marinovich tried to open the sliding glass door of an Irvine home. He was cited for trespassing, possession of a controlled substance (later concluded as methamphetamine), possession of drug paraphernalia and possession of marijuana. Marinovich was sentenced to 90 days in jail, but could avoid jail time if he had a successful rehab and stayed out of any legal trouble for 36 months.

== Family ==
Marinovich was married to Alexandria "Alix" Bambas and they have a son, Baron, and a daughter, Coski. Marinovich met his now ex-wife while the two were in rehab together and first asked her out on a date while they were in rehab. Marinovich has since been romantically linked to Ali Smith, the daughter of former USC coach Larry Smith. As of 2025, Marinovich lives in Hawaii.

Marinovich has a younger half-brother, Mikhail Marinovich, who played college football as a defensive end at Syracuse University from 2008 to 2011.

Todd's father, Marv Marinovich, died at the age of 81 in December 2020.
