= 1990 NCAA Division I-A football rankings =

- Season: 1990
- Bowl season: 1990–91 bowl games
- Preseason No. 1: Miami (FL)
- End of season champions: Colorado (AP, USAT/CNN); Georgia Tech (Coaches)
- Conference with most teams in final AP poll: Big Ten and SEC (4)

Two human polls comprised the 1990 National Collegiate Athletic Association (NCAA) Division I-A football rankings. Unlike most sports, college football's governing body, the NCAA, does not bestow a national championship, instead that title is bestowed by one or more different polling agencies. There are two main weekly polls that begin in the preseason—the AP Poll and the Coaches Poll.

== Legend ==
	Increase in ranking
	Decrease in ranking
	Not ranked previous week
	National champion
(#–#)	Win–loss record
(Italics)	Number of first place votes
т	Tied with team above or below also with this symbol

== AP Poll ==
	Preseason Aug 26	Week 1 Sep 4	Week 2 Sep 11	Week 3 Sep 18	Week 4 Sep 25	Week 5 Oct 2	Week 6 Oct 9	Week 7 Oct 16	Week 8 Oct 23	Week 9 Oct 30	Week 10 Nov 6	Week 11 Nov 13	Week 12 Nov 20	Week 13 Nov 27	Week 14 Dec 4	Week 15 (Final) Jan 3	
1.	Miami (FL) (24)	Miami (FL) (0–0) (27)	Notre Dame (0–0) (37)	Notre Dame (1–0) (44)	Notre Dame (2–0) (43)	Notre Dame (3–0) (48)	Michigan (3–1) (34)	Virginia (6–0) (38)	Virginia (7–0) (45)	Virginia (7–0) (44)	Notre Dame (7–1) (37)	Notre Dame (8–1) (55)	Colorado (10–1–1) (45)	Colorado (10–1–1) (41)	Colorado (10–1–1) (42)	Colorado (11–1–1) (39)	1.
2.	Notre Dame (22)	Notre Dame (0–0) (20)	Auburn (1–0) (8)	Florida State (2–0) (10)	Florida State (3–0) (11)	Florida State (4–0) (10)	Virginia (5–0) (14)	Miami (FL) (4–1) (15)	Auburn (5–0–1) (4)	Notre Dame (6–1) (6)	Washington (8–1) (13)	Colorado (9–1–1) (5)	Miami (FL) (7–2) (3)	Georgia Tech (9–0–1) (10)	Georgia Tech (10–0–1) (16)	Georgia Tech (11–0–1) (20)	2.
3.	Auburn (3)	Auburn (0–0) (4) т	Florida State (1–0) (11)	Auburn (2–0) (4)	Auburn (2–0) (3)	Michigan (2–1)	Miami (FL) (3–1) (6)	Tennessee (4–0–2) (2)	Notre Dame (5–1) (5)	Nebraska (8–0) (5)	Houston (8–0) (5)	Miami (FL) (6–2)	Georgia Tech (9–0–1) (8)	Miami (FL) (8–2) (2)	Texas (10–1) (2)	Miami (FL) (10–2) (1)	3.
4.	Florida State (6)	Florida State (0–0) (7) т	Michigan (0–0)	BYU (3–0) (2)	BYU (4–0) (3)	Virginia (5–0) (1)	Oklahoma (5–0) (1)	Nebraska (6–0) (3)	Nebraska (7–0) (5)	Auburn (6–0–1) (2)	Colorado (8–1–1) (5)	Georgia Tech (8–0–1)	BYU (9–1) (2)	BYU (10–1) (3)	Miami (FL) (9–2)	Florida State (10–2)	4.
5.	Colorado (4)	Michigan (0–0)	BYU (2–0) (3)	USC (2–0)	Tennessee (3–0–1)	Auburn (2–0–1)	Tennessee (3–0–2) (1)	Auburn (4–0–1)	Illinois (5–1)	Illinois (6–1)	Miami (FL) (6–2)	BYU (8–1)	Florida (9–1) (1)	Texas (9–1) (3)	Notre Dame (9–2)	Washington (10–2)	5.
6.	Michigan	Colorado (0–0–1)	USC (1–0)	Tennessee (3–0–1)	Michigan (1–1)	Tennessee (3–0–2)	Auburn (3–0–1)	Notre Dame (4–1)	Houston (6–0) (1)	Houston (7–0) (2)	Iowa (7–1)	Florida (8–1)	Texas (8–1) (1)	Florida (9–1) (1)	Florida State (9–2)	Notre Dame (9–3)	6.
7.	Nebraska	USC (1–0)	Tennessee (2–0–1)	Michigan (0–1)	Virginia (4–0)	Oklahoma (4–0)	Nebraska (5–0) (2)	Florida State (4–1)	Washington (6–1)	Washington (7–1) (1)	Georgia Tech (7–0–1)	Texas (7–1)	Notre Dame (8–2)	Notre Dame (9–2)	Penn State (9–2)	Michigan (9–3)	7.
8.	Tennessee	Tennessee (1–0–1)	Nebraska (2–0) (1)	Nebraska (2–0)	Nebraska (3–0)	Nebraska (4–0)	Notre Dame (3–1)	Illinois (4–1)	Miami (FL) (4–2)	Miami (FL) (5–2)	BYU (7–1)	Virginia (8–1)	Florida State (8–2)	Florida State (8–2)	Washington (9–2)	Tennessee (9–2–2)	8.
9.	USC	Clemson (1–0)	Colorado (1–0–1)	Miami (FL) (1–1)	Oklahoma (3–0)	Miami (FL) (2–1)	Florida (5–0) (1)	Houston (5–0)	BYU (5–1)	Colorado (7–1–1)	Tennessee (5–1–2)	Florida State (7–2)	Washington (9–2)	Washington (9–2)	Houston (10–1)	Clemson (10–2)	9.
10.	Clemson	Nebraska (1–0)	Miami (FL) (0–1)	Virginia (3–0)	Miami (FL) (1–1)	Florida (4–0)	Florida State (4–1)	Michigan (3–2)	Colorado (6–1–1)	BYU (6–1)	Florida (7–1)	Washington (8–2)	Nebraska (9–1)	Penn State (9–2)	Tennessee (8–2–2)	Houston (10–1)	10.
11.	Illinois	Illinois (0–0)	Virginia (2–0)	Oklahoma (2–0)	Texas A&M (3–0)	BYU (4–1)	Illinois (3–1)	Georgia Tech (5–0)	Tennessee (4–1–2)	Tennessee (4–1–2)	Virginia (7–1)	Nebraska (9–1)	Penn State (8–2)	Houston (9–1)	Florida (9–2)	Penn State (9–3)	11.
12.	Alabama	Texas A&M (1–0)	Texas A&M (1–0)	Texas A&M (2–0)	Washington (3–0)	Colorado (3–1–1)	Houston (4–0) (1)	BYU (5–1)	Florida State (4–2)	Florida State (5–2)	Florida State (6–2)	Houston (8–1)	Houston (9–1)	Tennessee (7–2–2)	Michigan (8–3)	Texas (10–2)	12.
13.	Texas A&M	Alabama (0–0)	Pittsburgh (2–0)	Arkansas (1–0)	Houston (2–0)	Houston (3–0)	BYU (4–1)	Washington (5–1)	Texas (4–1)	Iowa (6–1)	Nebraska (8–1)	Iowa (7–2)	Iowa (8–2)	Michigan (8–3)	BYU (10–2)	Florida (9–2)	13.
14.	Arkansas	Virginia (1–0)	Oklahoma (1–0)	Houston (2–0)	Illinois (2–1)	Illinois (2–1)	Colorado (4–1–1)	Colorado (5–1–1)	Florida (6–1)	Texas (5–1)	Texas (6–1)	Tennessee (5–2–2)	Tennessee (6–2–2)	Clemson (9–2)	Clemson (9–2)	Louisville (10–1–1)	14.
15.	Virginia	Arkansas (0–0)	Arkansas (0–0)	Illinois (1–1)	Ohio State (2–0)	USC (3–1)	Clemson (5–1)	USC (5–1)	Iowa (5–1)	Florida (6–1)	Auburn (6–1–1)	Ole Miss (8–1)	Michigan (7–3)	Ole Miss (9–2)	Ole Miss (9–2)	Texas A&M (9–3–1)	15.
16.	BYU	BYU (1–0)	Clemson (1–1)	Ohio State (2–0)	Arizona (3–0)	Clemson (4–1)	USC (4–1)	Oklahoma (5–1)	Georgia Tech (5–0–1)	Georgia Tech (6–0–1)	Ole Miss (8–1)	Michigan (6–3)	Clemson (9–2)	Illinois (8–3)	Illinois (8–3)	Michigan State (8–3–1)	16.
17.	Ohio State	Pittsburgh (1–0)	Ohio State (1–0)	Clemson (2–1)	Florida (3–0)	Washington (3–1)	Washington (4–1)	Florida (5–1)	Ole Miss (6–1)	Ole Miss (7–1)	Illinois (6–2)	Clemson (8–2)	Virginia (8–2)	Louisville (9–1–1)	Iowa (8–3)	Oklahoma (8–4)	17.
18.	Pittsburgh	Ohio State (0–0)	Houston (1–0)	Arizona (2–0)	USC (2–1)	Michigan State (1–1–1)	Georgia Tech (4–0)	Ole Miss (5–1)	Wyoming (8–0)	Clemson (7–2)	Clemson (8–2)	Penn State (7–2)	USC (8–2–1)	Iowa (8–3)	Louisville (9–1–1)	Iowa (8–4)	18.
19.	UCLA	UCLA (0–0)	Michigan State (0–0)	Florida (2–0)	Clemson (3–1)	Texas A&M (3–1)	Oregon (4–1)	Texas (3–1)	Clemson (6–2)	Wyoming (9–0)	Michigan (5–3)	USC (7–2–1)	Ohio State (7–2–1)	Nebraska (9–2)	Nebraska (9–2)	Auburn (8–3–1)	19.
20.	Washington	Washington (0–0)	Arizona (1–0)	Colorado (1–1–1)	Colorado (2–1–1)	Ohio State (2–1)	Texas A&M (4–1)	Indiana (4–0–1)	Michigan (3–3)	Michigan (4–3)	Oregon (7–2)	Louisville (9–1–1)	Louisville (9–1–1)	Auburn (7–2–1)	Oklahoma (8–3)	USC (8–4–1)	20.
21.	Penn State	Penn State (0–0)	Illinois (0–1)	Washington (2–0)	Arizona State (2–0)	Arkansas (2–1)	Arizona (4–1)	Wyoming (7–0)	USC (5–2)	USC (6–2)	Penn State (6–2)	Ohio State (6–2–1)	Ole Miss (8–2)	USC (8–3–1)	USC (8–3–1)	Ole Miss (9–3)	21.
22.	Oklahoma	Michigan State (0–0)	Washington (1–0)	Texas (1–0)	Michigan State (0–1–1)	Oregon (3–1)	Indiana (4–0)	Clemson (5–2)	Oklahoma (5–2)	Oregon (6–2)	Louisville (8–1–1)	Illinois (6–3)	Illinois (7–3)	Oklahoma (8–3)	Michigan State (7–3–1)	BYU (10–3)	22.
23.	Michigan State	Oklahoma (0–0)	Texas (1–0)	Arizona State (2–0)	Arkansas (1–1)	Georgia Tech (3–0)	Wyoming (6–0)	Iowa (4–1)	Arizona (5–2)	Arizona (6–2)	USC (6–2–1)	Michigan State (5–3–1)	Auburn (7–2–1)	Michigan State (7–3–1)	Southern Miss (8–3)	Virginia (8–4)	23.
24.	Houston	Houston (0–0)	Florida (1–0)	Michigan State (0–0–1)	Fresno State (4–0)	Fresno State (5–0)	Ole Miss (4–1)	Michigan State (2–2–1)	TCU (5–1)	Penn State (5–2)	Michigan State (4–3–1)	Auburn (6–2–1)	Michigan State (6–3–1)	Southern Miss (8–3)	Ohio State (7–3–1)	Nebraska (9–3)	24.
25.	West Virginia	West Virginia (1–0)	Arizona State (1–0)	Pittsburgh (2–1)	South Carolina (3–0)	Arizona (3–1)	Iowa (3–1)	Texas A&M (4–2)	Oregon (5–2)	Louisville (7–1–1)	Wyoming (9–1)	Southern Miss (8–3)	Southern Miss (8–3)	Ohio State (7–3–1)	Alabama (7–4)	Illinois (8–4)	25.
	Preseason Aug 26	Week 1 Sep 4	Week 2 Sep 11	Week 3 Sep 18	Week 4 Sep 25	Week 5 Oct 2	Week 6 Oct 9	Week 7 Oct 16	Week 8 Oct 23	Week 9 Oct 30	Week 10 Nov 6	Week 11 Nov 13	Week 12 Nov 20	Week 13 Nov 27	Week 14 Dec 4	Week 15 (Final) Jan 3	
		None	Dropped: UCLA; Penn State; Alabama; West Virginia	None	Dropped: Texas; Pittsburgh	Dropped: Arizona State; South Carolina	Dropped: Michigan State; Ohio State; Arkansas; Fresno State	Dropped: Oregon; Arizona	Dropped: Indiana; Michigan State; Texas A&M	Dropped: Oklahoma; TCU	Dropped: Arizona	Dropped: Oregon; Wyoming	None	Dropped: Virginia	Dropped: Auburn	Dropped: Southern Miss; Ohio State; Alabama	

== Coaches Poll ==
The Coaches Poll expanded to 25 teams in 1990, joining the AP poll which had done so in 1989. Florida, Houston, and Oklahoma were on probation by the NCAA during the 1990 season; they were therefore ineligible to receive votes in the Coaches Poll.

	Preseason Aug 26	Week 1 Sep 3	Week 2 Sep 10	Week 3 Sep 17	Week 4 Sep 24	Week 5 Oct 1	Week 6 Oct 8	Week 7 Oct 15	Week 8 Oct 22	Week 9 Oct 29	Week 10 Nov 5	Week 11 Nov 12	Week 12 Nov 19	Week 13 Nov 26	Week 14 Dec 3	Week 15 (Final) Jan 3	
1.	Miami (FL) (25)	Miami (FL) (0–0)	Notre Dame (0–0) (30)	Notre Dame (1–0) (39)	Notre Dame (2–0) (34)	Notre Dame (3–0) (45)	Michigan (3–1) (22)	Virginia (6–0) (29)	Virginia (7–0) (39)	Virginia (7–0) (35)	Notre Dame (7–1) (38)	Notre Dame (8–1) (51)	Colorado (10–1–1) (45)	Colorado (10–1–1) (39)	Colorado (10–1–1) (38)	Georgia Tech (11–0–1) (30)	1.
2.	Notre Dame (15)	Notre Dame (0–0)	Florida State (1–0) (10)	Florida State (2–0) (9)	Florida State (3–0) (13)	Florida State (4–0) (10)	Nebraska (5–0) (16)	Miami (FL) (4–1) (7)	Nebraska (7–0) (14)	Nebraska (8–0) (16)	Washington (8–1) (18)	Colorado (9–1–1) (3)	Miami (7–2) (3)	Miami (FL) (8–2) (3)	Georgia Tech (10–0–1) (7)	Colorado (11–1–1) (27)	2.
3.	Florida State (8)	Florida State (0–0)	Auburn (1–0) (4)	Auburn (2–0) (5)	Auburn (2–0) (4)	Nebraska (4–0)	Virginia (5–0) (10)	Nebraska (6–0) (13)	Auburn (5–0–1) (3)	Notre Dame (6–1) (1)	Colorado (8–1–1) (2)	Miami (FL) (6–2)	Georgia Tech (9–0–1) (4)	Georgia Tech (9–0–1) (3)	Texas (10–1)	Miami (FL) (10–2) (2)	3.
4.	Auburn (8)	Auburn (0–0)	USC (1–0) (1)	BYU (3–0) (1)	BYU (4–0) (2)	Michigan (2–1)	Miami (FL) (3–1) (4)	Tennessee (4–0–2) (3)	Notre Dame (5–1)	Auburn (6–0–1) (3)	Miami (FL) (6–2)	BYU (8–1)	BYU (9–1) (2)	BYU (10–1) (3) т	Miami (FL) (9–2) (2)	Florida State (10–2)	4.
5.	Colorado (2)	USC (1–0)	Michigan (0–0)	USC (2–0) (1)	Tennessee (3–0–1)	Virginia (5–0)	Tennessee (3–0–2) (1)	Auburn (4–0–1) (2)	Illinois (5–1)	Washington (7–1) (1)	Iowa (7–1)	Georgia Tech (8–0–1)	Texas (8–1) (1)	Texas (9–1) (2) т	Florida State (9–2)	Washington (10–2)	5.
6.	USC	Michigan (0–0)	Tennessee (2–0–1)	Tennessee (3–0–1)	Nebraska (3–0) (1)	Auburn (2–0–1)	Auburn (3–0–1) (3)	Notre Dame (4–1)	Washington (6–1)	Illinois (6–1)	BYU (7–1)	Texas (7–1) (1)	Nebraska (9–1)	Notre Dame (9–2)	Notre Dame (9–2)	Notre Dame (9–3)	6.
7.	Michigan	Colorado (0–0–1)	BYU (2–0) (2)	Nebraska (2–0) (1)	Michigan (1–1)	Tennessee (3–0–2)	Notre Dame (3–1)	Florida State (4–1)	BYU (5–1)	Colorado (7–1–1)	Georgia Tech (7–0–1)	Virginia (8–1)	Washington (9–2)	Washington (9–2)	Washington (9–2)	Tennessee (9–2–2)	7.
8.	Nebraska	Tennessee (0–0–1)	Nebraska (2–0) (1)	Miami (FL) (1–1)	Virginia (4–0)	Miami (FL) (2–1)	Florida State (4–1)	Michigan (3–2)	Colorado (6–1–1)	Miami (FL) (5–2)	Tennessee (5–1–2)	Washington (8–2)	Notre Dame (8–2)	Florida State (8–2)	Penn State (9–2)	Michigan (9–3)	8.
9.	Tennessee	Nebraska (0–0)	Colorado (1–0–1)	Virginia (3–0)	Miami (FL) (1–1)	Colorado (3–1–1)	BYU (4–1)	Illinois (4–1)	Miami (FL) (4–2)	BYU (6–1)	Virginia (7–1)	Nebraska (9–1)	Florida State (8–2)	Penn State (9–2)	BYU (10–2)	Clemson (10–2)	9.
10.	Clemson	Clemson (1–0)	Miami (FL) (0–1)	Michigan (0–1)	Texas A&M (3–0)	BYU (4–1)	USC (4–1)	BYU (5–1)	Tennessee (4–1–2)	Tennessee (4–1–2)	Nebraska (8–1)	Florida State (7–2)	Penn State (8–2)	Tennessee (7–2–2)	Tennessee (8–2–2)	Penn State (9–3)	10.
11.	Texas A&M	Texas A&M (0–0)	Virginia (2–0)	Texas A&M (2–0)	Washington (3–0)	USC (3–1)	Colorado (4–1–1)	Georgia Tech (5–0)	Florida State (4–2)	Florida State (5–2)	Florida State (6–2)	Ole Miss (8–1)	Iowa (8–2)	Clemson (9–2)	Clemson (9–2)	Texas (10–2)	11.
12.	Illinois	Illinois (0–0)	Texas A&M (1–0)	Ohio State (2–0)	Ohio State (2–0)	Illinois (2–1)	Illinois (3–1)	Washington (5–1)	Georgia Tech (5–0–1)	Texas (5–1)	Texas (6–1)	Iowa (7–2)	Tennessee (6–2–2)	Michigan (8–3)	Michigan (8–3)	Louisville (10–1–1)	12.
13.	Ohio State	Virginia (1–0)	Pittsburgh (2–0)	Arkansas (1–0)	Arizona (3–0)	Clemson (4–1)	Washington (4–1)	USC (5–1)	Iowa (5–1)	Iowa (6–1)	Auburn (6–1–1)	Tennessee (5–2–2)	Clemson (9–2)	Ole Miss (9–2)	Nebraska (9–2)	Texas A&M (9–3–1)	13.
14.	BYU	Ohio State (0–0)	Ohio State (1–0)	Arizona (2–0)	USC (2–1)	Washington (3–1)	Clemson (5–1)	Colorado (5–1–1)	Texas (4–1)	Georgia Tech (6–0–1)	Ole Miss (8–1)	Penn State (7–2)	Virginia (8–2)	Nebraska (9–2)	Ole Miss (9–2)	Michigan State (8–3–1)	14.
15.	Arkansas	Arkansas (0–0)	Arkansas (0–0)	Florida (2–0)	Illinois (2–1)	Texas A&M (3–1)	Georgia Tech (4–0)	Texas (3–1)	Ole Miss (6–1)	Ole Miss (7–1)	Illinois (6–2)	Clemson (8–2)	Michigan (7–3)	Iowa (8–3)	Iowa (8–3)	Virginia (8–4)	15.
16.	Washington	Washington (0–0)	Arizona (1–0)	Washington (2–0)	Colorado (2–1–1)	Arkansas (2–1)	Texas A&M (4–1)	Indiana (4–0–1)	Wyoming (8–0)	Wyoming (9–0)	Clemson (8–2)	Michigan (6–3)	USC (8–2–1)	Louisville (9–1–1)	Louisville (9–1–1)	Iowa (8–4)	16.
17.	Alabama	Alabama (0–0)	Texas (1–0) т	Illinois (1–1)	Florida (3–0)	Oregon (3–1)	Oregon (4–1)	Wyoming (7–0)	Clemson (6–2)	Clemson (7–2)	Michigan (5–3)	Louisville (9–1–1)	Ole Miss (8–2) т	Texas A&M (8–2–1)	Illinois (8–3)	BYU (10–3) т	17.
18.	Penn State	BYU (1–0)	Illinois (0–1) т	Colorado (1–1–1)	Clemson (3–1)	Georgia Tech (3–0)	Indiana (4–0)	Ole Miss (5–1)	Michigan (3–3)	Michigan (4–3)	Oregon (7–2)	Ohio State (6–2–1)	Ohio State (7–2–1) т	USC (8–3–1)	USC (8–3–1)	Nebraska (9–3) т	18.
19.	UCLA	Pittsburgh (1–0)	Clemson (1–1)	Clemson (2–1)	Fresno State (4–0)	Michigan State (1–1–1)	Wyoming (6–0)	TCU (5–1) т	TCU (5–1)	Arizona (6–2)	Penn State (6–2)	USC (7–2–1)	Louisville (9–1–1)	Illinois (8–3)	Texas A&M (8–3–1)	Auburn (8–3–1)	19.
20.	Pittsburgh	Penn State (0–0)	Washington (1–0)	Texas (1–0)	Michigan State (0–1–1)	Fresno State (5–0)	Arizona (4–1) т	Iowa (4–1) т	USC (5–2)	Oregon (6–2)	Louisville (8–1–1)	Texas A&M (6–2–1)	Illinois (7–3)	Auburn (7–2–1)	Michigan State (7–3–1) т	San Jose State (9–2–1)	20.
21.	Virginia	UCLA (0–0)	Florida (1–0)	Fresno State (3–0) т	Ole Miss (2–1)	Arizona (3–1)	Ole Miss (4–1) т	Texas A&M (4–2)	Arizona (5–2)	Penn State (5–2)	Wyoming (9–1)	Auburn (6–2–1)	Auburn (7–2–1)	Michigan State (7–3–1)	Ohio State (7–3–1) т	Syracuse (7–4–2)	21.
22.	Michigan State	Fresno State (1–0)	Michigan State (0–0)	Arizona State (2–0) т	Arkansas (1–1)	Indiana (3–0)	Texas (2–1)	Clemson (5–2)	Oregon (5–2)	Louisville (7–1–1)	Texas A&M (6–2–1)	Michigan State (5–3–1)	Texas A&M (7–2–1)	Ohio State (7–3–1)	Alabama (7–4)	USC (8–4–1)	22.
23.	Arizona	Michigan State (0–0) т	Fresno State (2–0)	Oregon (2–0)	Wyoming (4–0) т	Ole Miss (3–1)	Arkansas (2–2)	Michigan State (2–2–1)	Louisville (6–1–1)	USC (6–2)	Fresno State (7–1–1)	Fresno State (8–1–1)	San Jose State (8–2–1) т	Southern Miss (8–3) т	Virginia (8–3)	Ole Miss (9–3)	23.
24.	Syracuse т	Texas (0–0) т	Arizona State (1–0)	Michigan State (0–0–1)	Arizona State (2–0) т	Wyoming (5–0)	Iowa (3–1)	Oregon (4–2)	Penn State (4–2)	Texas A&M (5–2–1) т	Ohio State (5–2–1) т	Illinois (6–3)	Michigan State (6–3–1) т	Virginia (8–3) т	Southern Miss (8–3)	Illinois (8–4)	24.
25.	Texas т	Florida (0–0) т	Georgia Tech (1–0)	Syracuse (1–1–1)	Iowa (2–0)	Ohio State (2–1)	TCU (4–1)	Louisville (5–1–1)	Texas A&M (4–2–1)	North Carolina (5–2–1) т	Arizona (6–3) т	Southern Miss (8–3) т California (6–3–1) т	Baylor (7–2–1)	San Jose State (8–2–1) т; Oregon (8–3) т	San Jose State (8–2–1)	Virginia Tech (6–5)	25.
	Preseason Aug 26	Week 1 Sep 3	Week 2 Sep 10	Week 3 Sep 17	Week 4 Sep 24	Week 5 Oct 1	Week 6 Oct 8	Week 7 Oct 15	Week 8 Oct 22	Week 9 Oct 29	Week 10 Nov 5	Week 11 Nov 12	Week 12 Nov 19	Week 13 Nov 26	Week 14 Dec 3	Week 15 (Final) Jan 3	
		Dropped: Arizona; Syracuse	Dropped: Alabama; Penn State; UCLA	Dropped: Pittsburgh; Georgia Tech	Dropped: Texas; Oregon; Syracuse	Dropped: Florida; Arizona State; Iowa	Dropped: Michigan State; Fresno State; Ohio State	Dropped: Arizona; Arkansas	Dropped: Indiana; Michigan State	Dropped: TCU	Dropped: USC; North Carolina	Dropped: Oregon; Wyoming; Arizona	Dropped: Fresno State; Southern Miss; California	Dropped: Baylor	Dropped: Auburn; Oregon	Dropped: Ohio State; Alabama; Southern Miss	

== USAT/CNN Poll ==
	Week 16 Final Jan 2	
1.	Colorado (11–1–1) (30)	1.
2.	Georgia Tech (11–0–1) (19)	2.
3.	Miami (FL) (10–2) (1)	3.
4.	Florida State (10–2)	4.
5.	Washington (10–2)	5.
6.	Notre Dame (9–3)	6.
7.	Tennessee (9–2–2)	7.
8.	Michigan (9–3)	8.
9.	Clemson (10–2)	9.
10.	Texas (10–2)	10.
11.	Penn State (9–3)	11.
12.	Houston (10–1)	12.
13.	Florida (9–2)	13.
14.	Louisville (10–1–1)	14.
15.	Michigan State (8–3–1)	15.
16.	Texas A&M (8–3–1)	16.
17.	Oklahoma (8–3)	17.
18.	Iowa (8–4)	18.
19.	Auburn (8–3–1)	19.
20.	BYU (10–3)	20.
21.	Ole Miss (9–3)	21.
22.	USC (8–4–1)	22.
23.	Nebraska (9–3)	23.
24.	Illinois (8–4)	24.
25.	Virginia (8–4)	25.
	Week 16 Final Jan 2	
