= 1991 NFL draft =

National Football League draft

General information
- Date: April 21–22, 1991
- Location: Marriott Marquis in New York City, New York
- Network: ESPN

Overview
- 334 total selections in 12 rounds
- League: National Football League
- First selection: Russell Maryland, DT; Dallas Cowboys
- Mr. Irrelevant: Larry Wanke, QB; New York Giants
- Most selections (18): Dallas Cowboys
- Fewest selections (8): New Orleans Saints
- Hall of Famers: 2: QB Brett Favre; CB Aeneas Williams

The 1991 NFL draft was the procedure by which National Football League teams selected amateur college football players. It is officially known as the NFL Annual Player Selection Meeting. The draft was held April 21–22, 1991, at the Marriott Marquis in New York City, New York. No teams elected to claim any players in the supplemental draft that year.

The first six selections of the draft were defensive players, the most in draft history. It began with the Dallas Cowboys using the first overall pick to select Russell Maryland. No previous draft had begun with more than three consecutive defensive picks.

The day of the draft, wide receiver and projected number one pick Raghib Ismail signed with the Toronto Argonauts of the Canadian Football League (CFL). He was nevertheless selected by the Los Angeles Raiders in the fourth round (100th overall), and began playing with the Raiders in 1993 after two CFL seasons.

== Player selections ==
*	Compensatory selection
†	Pro Bowler
‡	Hall of Famer

Positions key
Offense	Defense	Special teams
QB — Quarterback; RB — Running back; FB — Fullback; WR — Wide receiver; TE — Tight end; OL — Offensive lineman; T — Tackle; G — Guard; C — Center	DL — Defensive lineman; DT — Defensive tackle (Note: Includes nose tackle (NT)); DE — Defensive end; EDGE — Edge rusher; LB — Linebacker (Note: Includes middle linebacker (MLB/MIKE), weakside linebacker (WILL), strongside linebacker (SAM), off-ball linebacker, and outside linebacker (OLB)); DB — Defensive back; CB — Cornerback; S — Safety (Note: Includes free safety (FS) and strong safety (SS))	K — Kicker (Note: Also known as a placekicker (PK)); P — Punter; LS — Long snapper; RS — Return specialist (Note: Includes kickoff and punt returners)

Rnd.	Pick	Team	Player	Pos.	College	Notes
1	1	Dallas Cowboys	Russell Maryland ^{†}	DT	Miami (FL)	from New England (Note: No. 1: New England → Dallas (PD). New England traded a first-round selection (1st overall) to Dallas in exchange for first- and second-round selections (11th and 41st overall), CB Ron Francis, LB David Howard and LB Eugene Lockhart.)
1	2	Cleveland Browns	Eric Turner ^{†}	S	UCLA	
1	3	Atlanta Falcons	Bruce Pickens	CB	Nebraska	
1	4	Denver Broncos	Mike Croel	LB	Nebraska	
1	5	Los Angeles Rams	Todd Lyght ^{†}	CB	Notre Dame	
1	6	Phoenix Cardinals	Eric Swann ^{†}	DT	Wake Tech	
1	7	Tampa Bay Buccaneers	Charles McRae	T	Tennessee	
1	–	New York Jets	Selection forfeited during the 1990 supplemental draft. (Note: The NY Jets forfeited a first-round selection after selecting WR Rob Moore in the 1990 supplemental draft.)			
1	8	Philadelphia Eagles	Antone Davis	T	Tennessee	from Green Bay (Note: No. 8: Green Bay → Philadelphia (D). Green Bay traded a first-round selection (8th overall) to Philadelphia in exchange for a first-round selection (19th overall) and a 1992 first-round selection.)
1	9	San Diego Chargers	Stanley Richard	S	Texas	
1	10	Detroit Lions	Herman Moore ^{†}	WR	Virginia	
1	11	New England Patriots	Pat Harlow	T	USC	from Minnesota via Dallas (Note: No. 11: Minnesota → Dallas → New England. Multiple trades: Minnesota → Dallas (PD). Minnesota traded first- and second-round selections (11th and 38th overall), 1990 first-, second- and sixth-round selections, 1992 first-, second- and third-round selections, LB Jesse Solomon, LB David Howard, CB Issiac Holt and DE Alex Stewart to Dallas in exchange for a third-round selection (68th overall), 1990 third-, fifth- and tenth-round selections, and RB Herschel Walker. Dallas → New England (PD). See Round 1: New England → Dallas.)
1	12	Dallas Cowboys	Alvin Harper	WR	Tennessee	
1	13	Atlanta Falcons	Mike Pritchard	WR	Colorado	from Indianapolis (Note: No. 13: Indianapolis → Atlanta (PD). Indianapolis traded a first-round selection (13th overall), a 1990 fifth-round selection, OT Chris Hinton and WR Andre Rison to Atlanta in exchange for 1990 first- and fourth-round selections.)
1	14	New England Patriots	Leonard Russell	RB	Arizona State	from New Orleans via Dallas (Note: No. 14: New Orleans → Dallas → New England. Multiple trades: New Orleans → Dallas (PD). New Orleans traded first- and third-round selections (14th and 70th overall), and a 1992 second-round selection to Dallas in exchange for QB Steve Walsh. Dallas → New England (D). Dallas traded a first-round selection (14th overall) to New England in exchange for first- and fourth-round selections (17th and 110th overall).)
1	15	Pittsburgh Steelers	Huey Richardson	DE	Florida	
1	16	Seattle Seahawks	Dan McGwire	QB	San Diego State	
1	17	Washington Redskins	Bobby Wilson	DT	Michigan State	from Houston via New England and Dallas (Note: No. 17: Houston → New England → Dallas → Washington. Multiple trades: Houston → New England (D). Houston traded a first-round selection (17th overall) to New England in exchange for second- and fourth-round selections (28th and 101st overall). New England → Dallas (D). See Round 1: Dallas → New England. Dallas → Washington (D). Dallas traded a first-round selection (17th overall) to Washington in exchange for first- and fifth-round selections (20th and 132nd overall).)
1	18	Cincinnati Bengals	Alfred Williams ^{†}	LB	Colorado	
1	19	Green Bay Packers	Vinnie Clark	CB	Ohio State	from Philadelphia (Note: No. 19: Philadelphia → Green Bay (D). See Round 1: Green Bay → Philadelphia.)
1	20	Dallas Cowboys	Kelvin Pritchett	DT	Mississippi	from Washington (Note: No. 20: Washington → Dallas (D). See Round 1: Dallas → Washington.)
1	21	Kansas City Chiefs	Harvey Williams	RB	LSU	
1	22	Chicago Bears	Stan Thomas	T	Texas	
1	23	Miami Dolphins	Randal Hill	WR	Miami (FL)	
1	24	Los Angeles Raiders	Todd Marinovich	QB	USC	
1	25	San Francisco 49ers	Ted Washington ^{†}	DT	Louisville	
1	26	Buffalo Bills	Henry Jones ^{†}	S	Illinois	
1	27	New York Giants	Jarrod Bunch	FB	Michigan	
2	28	Houston Oilers	Mike Dumas	S	Indiana	from New England (Note: No. 28: New England → Houston (D). See Round 1: Houston → New England.)
2	29	Cleveland Browns	Ed King	G	Auburn	
2	30	Denver Broncos	Reggie Johnson	TE	Florida State	
2	31	Los Angeles Rams	Roman Phifer	LB	UCLA	
2	32	Phoenix Cardinals	Mike Jones	DE	North Carolina State	
2	33	Atlanta Falcons	Brett Favre^{‡}^{†}	QB	Southern Mississippi	
2	34	New York Jets	Browning Nagle	QB	Louisville	
2	35	Green Bay Packers	Esera Tuaolo	DT	Oregon State	
2	36	San Diego Chargers	George Thornton	DT	Alabama	
2	37	Dallas Cowboys	Dixon Edwards	LB	Michigan State	from Detroit (Note: No. 37: Detroit → Dallas (D). Detroit traded second-, third- and fourth-round selections (37th, 64th and 108th overall) to Dallas in exchange for the rights to DT Kelvin Pritchett (drafted by Dallas with the 20th selection).)
2	38	Houston Oilers	Darryll Lewis	CB	Arizona	from Minnesota via Dallas (Note: No. 38: Minnesota → Dallas → Houston. Multiple trades: Minnesota → Dallas (PD). See Round 1: Minnesota → Dallas. Dallas → Houston (PD). Dallas traded a second-round selection (38th overall) and a 1992 fifth-round selection to Houston in exchange for RB Alonzo Highsmith.)
2	39	San Diego Chargers	Eric Bieniemy	RB	Colorado	from Tampa Bay (Note: No. 39: Tampa Bay → San Diego (PD). Tampa Bay traded a second-round selection (39th overall) and a 1990 third-round selection to San Diego in exchange for RB Gary Anderson.)
2	40	Indianapolis Colts	Shane Curry	DE	Miami (FL)	
2	41	New England Patriots	Jerome Henderson	CB	Clemson	from Dallas (Note: No. 41: Dallas → New England (PD). See Round 1: New England → Dallas.)
2	42	New Orleans Saints	Wesley Carroll	WR	Miami (FL)	
2	43	Los Angeles Raiders	Nick Bell	RB	Iowa	from Seattle (Note: No. 43: Seattle → LA Raiders (D). Seattle traded a second-round selection (43rd overall) to the LA Raiders in exchange for second- and fourth-round selections (51st and 98th overall).)
2	44	Houston Oilers	John Flannery	C	Syracuse	
2	45	San Francisco 49ers	Ricky Watters ^{†}	RB	Notre Dame	from Cincinnati (Note: No. 45: Cincinnati → San Francisco (D). Cincinnati traded a second-round selection (45th overall) to San Francisco in exchange for second- and fourth-round selections (52nd and 109th overall).)
2	46	Pittsburgh Steelers	Jeff Graham	WR	Ohio State	
2	47	San Diego Chargers	Eric Moten	G	Michigan State	from Washington (Note: No. 47: Washington → San Diego (PD). Washington traded a second-round selection (47th overall) and a 1992 fifth-round selection to San Diego in exchange for a 1992 first-round selection.)
2	48	Philadelphia Eagles	Jesse Campbell	S	North Carolina State	
2	49	Chicago Bears	Chris Zorich	DT	Notre Dame	
2	50	Kansas City Chiefs	Joe Valerio	T	Pennsylvania	
2	51	Seattle Seahawks	Doug Thomas	WR	Clemson	from LA Raiders (Note: No. 51: LA Raiders → Seattle (D). See Round 2: Seattle → LA Raiders.)
2	52	Cincinnati Bengals	Lamar Rogers	DE	Auburn	from Miami via San Francisco (Note: No. 52: Miami → San Francisco → Cincinnati. Multiple trades: Miami → San Francisco (PD). Miami traded a second-round selection (52nd overall) to San Francisco in exchange for a 1990 eleventh-round selection and CB Tim McKyer. San Francisco → Cincinnati (D). See Round 2: Cincinnati → San Francisco.)
2	53	San Francisco 49ers	John Johnson	LB	Clemson	
2	54	Buffalo Bills	Phil Hansen	DE	North Dakota State	
2	55	New York Giants	Kanavis McGhee	LB	Colorado	
3	56	New England Patriots	Calvin Stephens	G	South Carolina	
3	57	Cleveland Browns	James Jones	DT	Northern Iowa	
3	58	Detroit Lions	Reggie Barrett	WR	Texas-El Paso	from LA Rams (Note: No. 58: LA Rams → Detroit (PD). The LA Rams traded a third-round selection (58th overall) to Detroit in exchange for QB Chuck Long.)
3	59	Phoenix Cardinals	Aeneas Williams^{‡}^{†}	CB	Southern	
3	60	Miami Dolphins	Aaron Craver	FB	Fresno State	from Atlanta (Note: No. 60: Atlanta → Miami (PD). Atlanta traded third- and twelfth-round selections (60th and 331st overall) to Miami in exchange for CB Tim McKyer.)
3	61	Denver Broncos	Keith Traylor	LB	Central State (OK)	
3	62	Dallas Cowboys	Godfrey Myles	LB	Florida	from San Diego (Note: No. 62: San Diego → Dallas (PD). San Diego traded a third-round selection (62nd overall) to Dallas in exchange for three 1990 sixth-round selections.)
3	63	New York Jets	Mo Lewis ^{†}	LB	Georgia	from Green Bay (Note: No. 63: Green Bay → NY Jets (D). Green Bay traded a third-round pick (63rd overall) to the NY Jets in exchange for third- and fifth-round selections (67th and 121st overall).)
3	64	Dallas Cowboys	James Richards	G	California	from Detroit (Note: No. 64: Detroit → Dallas (D). See Round 2: Detroit → Dallas.)
3	65	Minnesota Vikings	Carlos Jenkins	LB	Michigan State	
3	66	Tampa Bay Buccaneers	Lawrence Dawsey	WR	Florida State	
3	67	Green Bay Packers	Don Davey	DE	Wisconsin	from NY Jets (Note: No. 67: NY Jets → Green Bay (D). See Round 3: Green Bay → NY Jets.)
3	68	Minnesota Vikings	Jake Reed	WR	Grambling State	from Dallas (Note: No. 68: Dallas → Minnesota (PD). See Round 1: Minnesota → Dallas.)
3	69	Indianapolis Colts	Dave McCloughan	S	Colorado	
3	70	Dallas Cowboys	Erik Williams ^{†}	T	Central State (OH)	from New Orleans (Note: No. 70: New Orleans → Dallas (PD). See Round 1: New Orleans → Dallas.)
3	71	Houston Oilers	Steve Jackson	CB	Purdue	
3	72	Cincinnati Bengals	Bob Dahl	T	Notre Dame	
3	73	Pittsburgh Steelers	Ernie Mills	WR	Florida	
3	74	Seattle Seahawks	David Daniels	WR	Penn State	
3	75	Philadelphia Eagles	Rob Selby	T	Auburn	
3	76	Washington Redskins	Ricky Ervins	RB	USC	
3	77	Kansas City Chiefs	Tim Barnett	WR	Jackson State	
3	78	Chicago Bears	Chris Gardocki ^{†}	P	Clemson	
3	79	Houston Oilers	Kevin Donnalley	T	North Carolina	from Miami (Note: No. 79: Miami → Houston (PD). Miami traded a third-round selection (79th overall) to Houston in exchange for LB John Grimsley.)
3	80	Tampa Bay Buccaneers	Robert Wilson	RB	Texas A&M	from LA Raiders (Note: No. 80: LA Raiders → Tampa Bay (PD). The LA Raiders traded a third-round selection (80th overall) to Tampa Bay in exchange for LB Winston Moss.)
3	81	Green Bay Packers	Chuck Webb	RB	Tennessee	from San Francisco (Note: No. 81: San Francisco → Green Bay (D). San Francisco traded a third-round selection (81st overall) to Green Bay in exchange for fourth- and fifth-round selections (95th and 122nd overall).)
3	82	Buffalo Bills	Darryl Wren	CB	Pittsburg State (KS)	
3	83	New York Giants	Ed McCaffrey ^{†}	WR	Stanford	
4	84	New England Patriots	Scott Zolak	QB	Maryland	
4	85	Cleveland Browns	Pio Sagapolutele	DT	San Diego State	
4	86	Phoenix Cardinals	Dexter Davis	CB	Clemson	
4	87	Atlanta Falcons	Moe Gardner	DT	Illinois	
4	88	Pittsburgh Steelers	Sammy Walker	CB	Texas Tech	from Denver via New England (Note: No. 88: Denver → New England → Pittsburgh. Multiple trades: Denver → New England (PD). Denver traded a fourth-round selection (88th overall) to New England in exchange for a 1990 fifth-round selection. New England → Pittsburgh (D). New England traded a fourth-round selection (88th overall) to Pittsburgh in exchange for fourth- and fifth-round selections (100th and 127th overall).)
4	89	Denver Broncos	Derek Russell	WR	Arkansas	from LA Rams (Note: No. 89: LA Rams → Denver (D). The LA Rams traded a fourth-round selection (89th overall) and RB Gaston Green to Denver in exchange for a twelfth-round selection (311th overall) and OT Gerald Perry.)
4	90	San Diego Chargers	Yancey Thigpen ^{†}	WR	Winston-Salem State	
4	91	Detroit Lions	Kevin Scott	CB	Stanford	
4	92	Minnesota Vikings	Randy Baldwin	RB	Mississippi	
4	93	Tampa Bay Buccaneers	Tony Covington	S	Virginia	
4	94	New York Jets	Mark Gunn	DT	Pittsburgh	
4	95	San Francisco 49ers	Mitch Donahue ^{†}	LB	Wyoming	from Green Bay (Note: No. 95: Green Bay → San Francisco (D). See Round 3: San Francisco → Green Bay.)
4	96	Indianapolis Colts	Mark Vander Poel	T	Colorado	
4	97	Dallas Cowboys	Curvin Richards	RB	Pittsburgh	
4	98	Seattle Seahawks	John Kasay ^{†}	K	Georgia	from New Orleans via LA Raiders (Note: No. 98: New Orleans → LA Raiders → Seattle. Multiple trades: New Orleans → LA Raiders (PD). New Orleans traded a fourth-round selection (98th overall) to the LA Raiders in exchange for 1990 sixth-, eighth-, ninth-, tenth- and eleventh-round selections. LA Raiders → Seattle (D). See Round 2: Seattle → LA Raiders.)
4	99	Cincinnati Bengals	Donald Hollas	QB	Rice	
4	100	Los Angeles Raiders	Raghib Ismail	WR	Notre Dame	from Pittsburgh via New England (Note: No. 100: Pittsburgh → New England → LA Raiders. Multiple trades: Pittsburgh → New England (D). See Round 4: New England → Pittsburgh. New England → LA Raiders (D). New England traded a fourth-round selection (100th overall) to the LA Raiders in exchange for a fifth-round selection (124th overall) and a 1992 fourth-round selection.)
4	101	Houston Oilers	David Rocker	DT	Auburn	from Seattle via New England (Note: No. 101: Seattle → New England → Houston. Multiple trades: Seattle → New England (PD). Seattle traded a fourth-round selection (101st overall), two 1990 first-round selections and a 1990 third-round selection to New England in exchange for 1990 first- and second-round selections. New England → Houston (D). See Round 1: Houston → New England.)
4	102	Houston Oilers	Marcus Robertson	S	Iowa State	
4	103	Pittsburgh Steelers	Adrian Cooper	TE	Oklahoma	from LA Rams (Note: No. 103: Washington → Pittsburgh (PD). Washington traded a fourth-round selection (103rd overall) to Pittsburgh in exchange for DE Tim Johnson.)
4	104	Philadelphia Eagles	William Thomas ^{†}	LB	Texas A&M	
4	105	Chicago Bears	Joe Johnson	CB	North Carolina State	
4	106	Dallas Cowboys	Bill Musgrave	QB	Oregon	from Kansas City (Note: No. 106: Kansas City → Dallas (PD). Kansas City traded a fourth-round selection (106th overall) and a 1990 third-round selection to Dallas in exchange for QB Steve Pelluer.)
4	107	Los Angeles Rams	Robert Bailey	CB	Miami (FL)	from LA Raiders (Note: No. 107: LA Raiders → LA Rams (PD). The LA Raiders traded a fourth-round selection (107th overall) to the LA Rams in exchange for RB Greg Bell.)
4	108	Dallas Cowboys	Tony Hill	DE	Tennessee-Chattanooga	from Miami via Washington and Detroit (Note: No. 108: Miami → Washington → Detroit → Dallas. Multiple trades: Miami → Washington (PD). Miami traded a fourth-round selection (108th overall) and a 1990 tenth-round selection to Washington in exchange for a 1990 fifth-round selection. Washington → Detroit (PD). Washington traded a fourth-round selection (108th overall) to Detroit in exchange for DT Eric Williams. Detroit → Dallas (D). See Round 2: Detroit → Dallas.)
4	109	Cincinnati Bengals	Rob Carpenter	WR	Syracuse	from San Francisco (Note: No. 109: San Francisco → Cincinnati (D). See Round 2: No. 45: Cincinnati → San Francisco.)
4	110	Dallas Cowboys	Kevin Harris	DE	Texas Southern	from Buffalo via New England (Note: No. 110: Buffalo → New England → Dallas. Multiple trades: Buffalo → New England (PD). Buffalo traded a fourth-round selection (110th overall) and a 1990 twelfth-round selection to New England in exchange for two 1990 seventh-round selections. New England → Dallas (D). See Round 1: Dallas → New England.)
4	111	New York Giants	Clarence Jones	T	Maryland	
5	112	New England Patriots	Jon Vaughn	RB	Michigan	
5	113	Miami Dolphins	Bryan Cox ^{†}	LB	Western Illinois	from Cleveland (Note: No. 113: Cleveland → Miami (PD). Cleveland traded a fifth-round selection (113th overall) to Miami in exchange for a 1990 seventh-round selection.)
5	114	Atlanta Falcons	James Goode	LB	Oklahoma	
5	115	Denver Broncos	Greg Lewis	RB	Washington	
5	116	Los Angeles Rams	Robert Young	DE	Mississippi State	
5	117	Phoenix Cardinals	Vance Hammond	DT	Clemson	
5	118	Detroit Lions	Scott Conover	G	Purdue	
5	119	Minnesota Vikings	Chris Thome	C	Minnesota	
5	120	Tampa Bay Buccaneers	Terry Bagsby	LB	East Texas State	
5	121	Miami Dolphins	Gene Williams	G	Iowa State	from NY Jets via Green Bay (Note: No. 121: NY Jets → Green Bay → Miami. Multiple trades: NY Jets → Green Bay (D). See Round 3: Green Bay → NY Jets. Green Bay → Miami (D). Green Bay traded a fifth-round selection (121st overall) to Miami in exchange for fifth- and sixth-round selections (135th and 164th overall).)
5	122	San Francisco 49ers	Merton Hanks ^{†}	S	Iowa	from Green Bay (Note: No. 122: Green Bay → San Francisco (D). See Round 3: San Francisco → Green Bay.)
5	123	San Diego Chargers	Duane Young	TE	Michigan State	
5	124	New England Patriots	Ben Coates ^{†}	TE	Livingstone College	from Dallas via LA Raiders (Note: No. 124: Dallas → LA Raiders → New England. Multiple trades: Dallas → LA Raiders (PD). Dallas traded a fifth-round selection (124th overall) to the LA Raiders in exchange for G John Gesek. LA Raiders → New England (D) See Round 4: New England → LA Raiders.)
5	125	Indianapolis Colts	Kerry Cash	TE	Texas	
5	126	New Orleans Saints	Reggie Jones	CB	Memphis State	
5	127	San Diego Chargers	Floyd Fields	S	Arizona State	from Pittsburgh via New England (Note: No. 127: Pittsburgh → New England → San Diego. Multiple trades: Pittsburgh → New England (D). See Round 4: New England → Pittsburgh. New England → San Diego (D). New England traded a fifth-round selection (127th overall) to San Diego in exchange for an eleventh-round selection (303rd overall) and a 1992 fourth-round selection.)
5	128	Seattle Seahawks	Harlan Davis	CB	Tennessee	
5	129	Houston Oilers	Gary Wellman	WR	USC	
5	130	Cincinnati Bengals	Mike Arthur	C	Texas A&M	
5	131	Philadelphia Eagles	Craig Erickson	QB	Miami (FL)	
5	132	Dallas Cowboys	Darrick Brownlow	LB	Illinois	from Washington (Note: No. 132: Washington → Dallas (D). See Round 1: Dallas → Washington.)
5	133	Kansas City Chiefs	Charles Mincy	S	Washington	
5	134	Chicago Bears	Anthony Morgan	WR	Tennessee	
5	135	Green Bay Packers	Jeff Fite	P	Memphis State	from Miami (Note: No. 135: Miami → Green Bay (D). See Round 5: Green Bay → Miami.)
5	136	Tampa Bay Buccaneers	Tim Ryan	G	Notre Dame	from LA Raiders (Note: No. 136: LA Raiders → Tampa Bay (PD). The LA Raiders traded a fifth-round selection (136th overall) to Tampa Bay in exchange for LB Winston Moss.)
5	137	San Francisco 49ers	Harry Boatswain	T	New Haven	
5	138	Buffalo Bills	Shawn Wilbourn	CB	Long Beach State	
5	139	New York Giants	Anthony Moss	LB	Florida State	
6	140	New England Patriots	David Key	DB	Michigan	
6	141	Cleveland Browns	Michael Jackson	WR	Southern Mississippi	
6	142	Denver Broncos	Nick Subis	T	San Diego State	
6	143	Los Angeles Rams	Neal Fort	T	Brigham Young	
6	144	Phoenix Cardinals	Eduardo Vega	T	Memphis State	
6	145	Atlanta Falcons	Erric Pegram	RB	North Texas	
6	146	Los Angeles Raiders	Nolan Harrison	DT	Indiana	from Minnesota (Note: No. 146: Minnesota → LA Raiders (D). Minnesota traded a sixth-round selection (146th overall) to the LA Raiders in exchange for sixth- and seventh-round selections (163rd and 180th overall).)
6	147	Tampa Bay Buccaneers	Rhett Hall	DT	California	
6	148	New York Jets	Blaise Bryant	RB	Iowa State	
6	149	Green Bay Packers	Walter Dean	RB	Grambling State	
6	150	San Diego Chargers	Jimmy Laister	T	Oregon Tech	
6	151	Detroit Lions	Richie Andrews	K	Florida State	
6	152	Indianapolis Colts	Mel Agee	DT	Illinois	
6	153	Dallas Cowboys	Mike Sullivan	G	Miami (FL)	
6	154	New Orleans Saints	Fred McAfee ^{†}	RB	Mississippi College	
6	155	Seattle Seahawks	Michael Sinclair ^{†}	DE	Eastern New Mexico	
6	156	Philadelphia Eagles	Andy Harmon	DE	Kent State	from Houston (Note: No. 156: Houston → Philadelphia (PD). Houston traded a sixth-round selection (156th overall) to Philadelphia in exchange for QB Don McPherson.)
6	157	Cincinnati Bengals	Richard Fain	CB	Florida	
6	158	Pittsburgh Steelers	Leroy Thompson	RB	Penn State	
6	159	Washington Redskins	Dennis Ransom	TE	Texas A&M	
6	160	New York Jets	Mike Riley	CB	Tulane	from Philadelphia (Note: No. 160: Philadelphia → NY Jets (PD). Philadelphia traded a sixth-round selection (160th overall) to the NY Jets in exchange for FB Roger Vick.)
6	161	Chicago Bears	Darren Lewis	RB	Texas A&M	
6	162	Kansas City Chiefs	Darrell Malone	CB	Jacksonville State	
6	163	Minnesota Vikings	Todd Scott	S	Southwestern Louisiana	from LA Raiders (Note: No. 163: LA Raiders → Minnesota (D). See Round 6: Minnesota → LA Raiders.)
6	164	Green Bay Packers	Joe Garten	C	Colorado	from Miami (Note: No. 164: Miami → Green Bay (D). See Round 5: Green Bay → Miami.)
6	165	San Francisco 49ers	Scott Bowles	T	North Texas	
6	166	Buffalo Bills	Millard Hamilton	WR	Clark Atlanta	
6	167	New York Giants	Corey Miller	LB	South Carolina	
7	168	New England Patriots	Blake Miller	C	Louisiana State	
7	169	Green Bay Packers	Frank Blevins	LB	Oklahoma	from Cleveland (Note: No. 169: Cleveland → Green Bay (PD). Cleveland traded a seventh-round selection (169th overall) to Green Bay in exchange for RB Brent Fullwood.)
7	170	Los Angeles Rams	Tyrone Shelton	RB	William & Mary	
7	171	Phoenix Cardinals	Ivory Lee Brown	RB	Arkansas–Pine Bluff	
7	172	Atlanta Falcons	Brian Mitchell	CB	Brigham Young	
7	173	Dallas Cowboys	Leon Lett	DT	Emporia State	from Denver (Note: No. 173: Denver → Dallas (PD). Denver traded a seventh-round selection (173rd overall) to Dallas in exchange for a 1992 eighth-round selection and G Dave Widell.)
7	174	Tampa Bay Buccaneers	Calvin Tiggle	LB	Georgia Tech	
7	175	New York Jets	Doug Parrish	CB	San Francisco State	
7	176	Green Bay Packers	Reggie Burnette	LB	Houston	
7	177	San Diego Chargers	David Jones	WR	Delaware State	
7	178	Detroit Lions	Franklin Thomas	TE	Grambling State	
7	179	Minnesota Vikings	Scotty Reagan	DT	Humboldt State	
7	180	Minnesota Vikings	Tripp Welborne	S	Michigan	from Dallas via LA Raiders (Note: No. 180: Dallas → LA Raiders → Minnesota. Multiple trades: Dallas → LA Raiders (PD). Dallas traded a seventh-round selection (180th overall) to the LA Raiders in exchange for LS Dale Hellestrae. LA Raiders → Minnesota (D). See Round 6: Minnesota → LA Raiders.)
7	181	Indianapolis Colts	James Bradley	WR	Michigan State	
7	182	New Orleans Saints	Howard Haynes	G	Florida State	
7	183	Houston Oilers	Kyle Freeman	LB	Angelo State	
7	184	Cincinnati Bengals	Fernandus Vinson	S	North Carolina State	
7	185	Pittsburgh Steelers	Andre Jones	LB	Notre Dame	
7	186	Atlanta Falcons	Mark Tucker	C	USC	from Seattle (Note: No. 186: Seattle → Atlanta (PD). Seattle traded a seventh-round selection (186th overall) to Atlanta in exchange for OT Ronnie Lee.)
7	187	Philadelphia Eagles	James Joseph	RB	Auburn	
7	188	Washington Redskins	Keith Cash	TE	Texas	
7	189	Kansas City Chiefs	Bernard Ellison	CB	Nevada	
7	190	Chicago Bears	Paul Justin	QB	Arizona State	
7	191	Miami Dolphins	Chris Green	S	Illinois	
7	192	San Diego Chargers	Terry Beauford	G	Florida A&M	from LA Raiders (Note: No. 192: LA Raiders → San Diego (PD). The LA Raiders traded a seventh-round selection (192nd overall) to San Diego in exchange for WR Jamie Holland.)
7	193	San Francisco 49ers	Sheldon Canley	RB	San Jose State	
7	194	Buffalo Bills	Amir Rasul	RB	Florida A&M	
7	195	New York Giants	Simmie Carter	DB	Southern Mississippi	
8	196	New England Patriots	Harry Colon	CB	Missouri	
8	197	Cleveland Browns	Frank Conover	DT	Syracuse	
8	198	Phoenix Cardinals	Greg Amsler	RB	Tennessee	from Phoenix via Denver (Note: No. 198: Phoenix → Denver → Phoenix. Multiple trades: Phoenix → Denver (PD). Phoenix traded an eighth-round selection (198th overall) to Denver in exchange for TE David Little. Denver → Phoenix (PD). Denver traded an eighth-round selection (198th overall) to Phoenix in exchange for DL David Galloway.)
8	199	Atlanta Falcons	Randy Austin	TE	UCLA	
8	200	Denver Broncos	Kenny Walker	DE	Nebraska	
8	201	Los Angeles Rams	Pat Tyrance	LB	Nebraska	
8	202	New York Jets	Tim James	DB	Colorado	
8	203	Green Bay Packers	Johnny Walker	WR	Texas	
8	204	Phoenix Cardinals	Jerry Evans	TE	Toledo	from San Diego (Note: No. 204: San Diego → Phoenix (PD). San Diego traded an eighth-round selection (204th overall) to Phoenix in exchange for OL Mike Zandofsky.)
8	205	Detroit Lions	Cedric Jackson	RB	Texas Christian	
8	206	Minnesota Vikings	Reggie Johnson	DE	Arizona	
8	207	Tampa Bay Buccaneers	Marty Carter	DB	Middle Tennessee State	
8	208	Indianapolis Colts	Tim Bruton	TE	Missouri	
8	209	Phoenix Cardinals	Scott Evans	DT	Oklahoma	from Dallas (Note: No. 209: Dallas → Phoenix (PD). Dallas traded an eighth-round selection (209th overall) to Phoenix in exchange for TE Rob Awalt.)
8	210	New Orleans Saints	Frank Wainright	TE	Northern Colorado	
8	211	Cincinnati Bengals	Mike Dingle	RB	South Carolina	
8	212	Pittsburgh Steelers	Dean Dingman	G	Michigan	
8	213	Los Angeles Raiders	Brian Jones	LB	Texas	from Seattle (Note: No. 213: Seattle → LA Raiders (PD). Seattle traded an eighth-round selection (213th overall) to the LA Raiders in exchange for S Vann McElroy.)
8	214	Houston Oilers	Gary Brown	RB	Penn State	
8	215	Washington Redskins	Jimmy Spencer	CB	Florida	
8	216	Philadelphia Eagles	Scott Kowalkowski	LB	Notre Dame	
8	217	Chicago Bears	Larry Horton	DB	Texas A&M	
8	218	Kansas City Chiefs	Tom Dohring	T	Michigan	
8	219	Los Angeles Raiders	Todd Woulard	LB	Alabama A&M	
8	220	Miami Dolphins	Roland Smith	DB	Miami (FL)	
8	221	San Francisco 49ers	Tony Hargain	WR	Oregon Tech	
8	222	Buffalo Bills	Brad Lamb	WR	Anderson (IN)	
8	223	New York Giants	Lamar McGriggs	DB	Western Illinois	
9	224	New England Patriots	O'Neil Glenn	G	Maryland	
9	225	Cleveland Browns	Raymond Irvin	DB	Central Florida	
9	226	Atlanta Falcons	Ernie Logan	DE	East Carolina	
9	227	Denver Broncos	Don Gibson	DT	USC	
9	228	Los Angeles Rams	Jeff Fields	DT	Arkansas State	
9	–	Phoenix Cardinals	Selection forfeited during the 1990 supplemental draft. (Note: Phoenix forfeited a ninth-round selection after selecting OT Willie Williams in the 1990 supplemental draft.)			
9	229	Green Bay Packers	Dean Witkowski	LB	North Dakota	
9	230	San Diego Chargers	Andy Katoa	LB	Southern Oregon State	
9	231	Detroit Lions	Darryl Milburn	DE	Grambling State	
9	232	Minnesota Vikings	Gerald Hudson	RB	Oklahoma State	
9	233	Tampa Bay Buccaneers	Treamelle Taylor	WR	Nevada	
9	234	New York Jets	Paul Glonek	DT	Arizona	
9	235	Dallas Cowboys	Damon Mays	WR	Missouri	
9	236	Indianapolis Colts	Howard Griffith	RB	Illinois	
9	237	New Orleans Saints	Anthony Wallace	RB	California	
9	238	Pittsburgh Steelers	Bruce McGonnigal	TE	Virginia	
9	239	Cleveland Browns	Shawn Wiggins	WR	Wyoming	from Seattle (Note: No. 239: Seattle → Cleveland (D). Seattle traded a ninth-round selection (239th overall) to Cleveland in exchange for DE Bob Buczkowski.)
9	240	Houston Oilers	Shawn Jefferson	WR	Central Florida	
9	241	Cincinnati Bengals	Shane Garrett	WR	Texas A&M	
9	242	Philadelphia Eagles	Chuck Weatherspoon	RB	Houston	
9	243	Washington Redskins	Charles Bell	DB	Baylor	
9	244	Kansas City Chiefs	Robbie Keen	K	California	
9	245	Chicago Bears	Mike Stonebreaker	LB	Notre Dame	
9	246	Miami Dolphins	Scott Miller	WR	UCLA	
9	247	Los Angeles Raiders	Tahaun Lewis	DB	Nebraska	
9	248	San Francisco 49ers	Louis Riddick	S	Pittsburgh	
9	249	Buffalo Bills	Mark Maddox	LB	Northern Michigan	
9	250	New York Giants	Jerry Bouldin	WR	Mississippi State	
10	251	New England Patriots	Randy Bethel	TE	Miami (FL)	
10	252	Cleveland Browns	Brian Greenfield	P	Pittsburgh	
10	253	Denver Broncos	Curtis Mayfield	WR	Oklahoma State	
10	254	San Diego Chargers	Roland Poles	RB	Tennessee	from LA Rams (Note: No. 254: LA Rams → San Diego (PD). The LA Rams traded a tenth-round selection (254th overall) to San Diego in exchange for P Keith English.)
10	255	Phoenix Cardinals	Herbie Anderson	DB	Texas A&I	
10	256	Atlanta Falcons	Walter Sutton	WR	SW Minnesota	
10	257	San Diego Chargers	Mike Heldt	C	Notre Dame	
10	258	Atlanta Falcons	Pete Lucas	T	Wisconsin–Stevens Point	from Detroit (Note: No. 258: Detroit → Atlanta (PD). Detroit traded a tenth-round selection (258th overall) to Atlanta in exchange for RB Greg Paterra.)
10	259	Minnesota Vikings	Brady Pierce	T	Wisconsin	
10	260	Tampa Bay Buccaneers	Pat O'Hara	QB	USC	
10	261	New York Jets	Al Baker	RB	Kentucky	
10	262	Green Bay Packers	Rapier Porter	TE	Arkansas–Pine Bluff	
10	263	Indianapolis Colts	Frank Giannetti	DE	Penn State	
10	264	Dallas Cowboys	Sean Love	G	Penn State	
10	265	Tampa Bay Buccaneers	Hyland Hickson	RB	Michigan State	from New Orleans (Note: No. 265: New Orleans → Tampa Bay (PD). New Orleans traded a tenth-round selection (265th overall) to Tampa Bay in exchange for DL Robert Goff.)
10	266	Seattle Seahawks	Erik Ringoen	LB	Hofstra	
10	267	Houston Oilers	Curtis Moore	LB	Kansas	
10	268	Cincinnati Bengals	Jim Lavin	G	Georgia Tech	
10	269	Pittsburgh Steelers	Ariel Solomon	T	Colorado	
10	270	Washington Redskins	Cris Shale	P	Bowling Green	
10	271	Philadelphia Eagles	Eric Harmon	G	Clemson	
10	272	Chicago Bears	Tom Backes	DE	Oklahoma	
10	273	Kansas City Chiefs	Eric Ramsey	DB	Auburn	
10	274	Los Angeles Raiders	Andrew Glover	TE	Grambling State	
10	275	Miami Dolphins	Michael Titley	TE	Iowa	
10	276	San Francisco 49ers	Byron Holdbrooks	DT	Alabama	
10	277	Buffalo Bills	Tony DeLorenzo	G	New Mexico State	
10	278	New York Giants	Luis Cristobal	G	Miami (FL)	
11	279	New England Patriots	Vince Moore	WR	Tennessee	
11	280	Cleveland Browns	Todd Jones	G	Henderson State	
11	281	Los Angeles Rams	Terry Crews	LB	Western Michigan	
11	282	Phoenix Cardinals	Nathan LaDuke	DB	Arizona State	
11	283	Atlanta Falcons	Joe Sims	DT	Nebraska	
11	284	Denver Broncos	Shawn Moore	QB	Virginia	
11	285	Detroit Lions	Slip Watkins	WR	Louisiana State	
11	286	Minnesota Vikings	Ivan Caesar	LB	Boston College	
11	287	Tampa Bay Buccaneers	Mike Sunvold	DT	Minnesota	
11	288	New York Jets	Rocen Keeton	LB	UCLA	
11	289	Green Bay Packers	J.J. Wierenga	DE	Central Michigan	
11	290	San Diego Chargers	Joachim Weinberg	WR	Johnson C. Smith	
11	291	Dallas Cowboys	Tony Boles	RB	Michigan	
11	292	Indianapolis Colts	Jerry Crafts	T	Louisville	
11	293	New Orleans Saints	Scott Ross	LB	USC	
11	294	Houston Oilers	James Smith	DB	Richmond	
11	295	Cincinnati Bengals	Chris Smith	TE	Brigham Young	
11	296	Pittsburgh Steelers	Efrum Thomas	DB	Alabama	
11	297	Seattle Seahawks	Tony Stewart	RB	Iowa	
11	298	Philadelphia Eagles	Mike Flores	DE	Louisville	
11	299	Washington Redskins	David Gulledge	S	Jacksonville State	
11	300	Kansas City Chiefs	Bobby Olive	WR	Ohio State	
11	301	Chicago Bears	Stacy Long	G	Clemson	
11	302	Miami Dolphins	Ernie Rogers	G	California	
11	303	New England Patriots	Paul Alsbury	P	Southwest Texas State	from LA Raiders via San Diego (Note: No. 303: LA Raiders → San Diego → New England. Multiple trades: LA Raiders → San Diego (PD). The LA Raiders traded an eleventh-round selection (303rd overall) to San Diego in exchange for RB Napoleon McCallum. San Diego → New England (D). See Round 5: New England → San Diego.)
11	304	San Francisco 49ers	Bobby Slaughter	WR	Louisiana Tech	
11	305	Buffalo Bills	Dean Kirkland	G	Washington	
11	306	New York Giants	Ted Popson	TE	Portland State	
12	307	New England Patriots	Tim Edwards	DT	Delta State	
12	308	Cleveland Browns	Elijah Austin	DT	North Carolina State	
12	309	Phoenix Cardinals	Jeff Bridewell	QB	California-Davis	
12	310	Atlanta Falcons	Bob Christian	FB	Northwestern	
12	311	Los Angeles Rams	Jeff Pahukoa	T	Washington	from Denver (Note: No. 311: Denver → LA Rams (D). See Round 4: LA Rams → Denver.)
12	312	Los Angeles Rams	Ernie Thompson	RB	Indiana	
12	313	Minnesota Vikings	Darren Hughes	WR	Carson–Newman	
12	314	Tampa Bay Buccaneers	Al Chamblee	LB	Virginia Tech	
12	315	New York Jets	Mark Hayes	T	Arizona State	
12	316	Green Bay Packers	Linzy Collins	WR	Missouri	
12	317	San Diego Chargers	Chris Samuels	RB	Texas	
12	318	Detroit Lions	Zeno Alexander	LB	Arizona	
12	319	Indianapolis Colts	Rob Ludeke	C	Penn State	
12	320	Dallas Cowboys	Larry Brown	CB	Texas Christian	
12	321	New Orleans Saints	Mark Drabczak	G	Minnesota	
12	322	Cincinnati Bengals	Antoine Bennett	DB	Florida A&M	
12	323	Pittsburgh Steelers	Jeff Brady	LB	Kentucky	
12	324	Seattle Seahawks	Ike Harris	G	South Carolina	
12	325	Houston Oilers	Alex Johnson	WR	Miami (FL)	
12	326	Washington Redskins	Keenan McCardell ^{†}	WR	UNLV	
12	327	Philadelphia Eagles	Darrell Beavers	DB	Morehead State	
12	328	Chicago Bears	John Cook	DT	Washington	
12	329	Kansas City Chiefs	Ron Shipley	G	New Mexico	
12	330	Los Angeles Raiders	Dennis Johnson	WR	Winston-Salem State	
12	331	Miami Dolphins	Joe Brunson	DT	Tennessee-Chattanooga	from Miami via Atlanta (Note: No. 331: Miami → Atlanta → Miami. Multiple trades: Miami → Atlanta (PD). Miami traded a twelfth-round selection (331st overall) to Atlanta in exchange for DT Shawn Lee. Atlanta → Miami (D). See Round 3: Atlanta → Miami.)
12	332	San Francisco 49ers	Cliff Confer	DE	Michigan State	
12	333	Buffalo Bills	Stephen Clark	TE	Texas	
12	334	New York Giants	Larry Wanke	QB	John Carroll	

== Hall of Famers ==
- Aeneas Williams, cornerback from Southern, taken 3rd round 59th overall by Phoenix Cardinals.

Inducted: Professional Football Hall of Fame class of 2014.

- Brett Favre, quarterback from Southern Mississippi, taken in the 2nd round 33rd overall by Atlanta Falcons.

Inducted: Professional Football Hall of Fame class of 2016.

== Notable undrafted players ==
†	Pro Bowler

Original NFL team	Player	Pos.	College	Notes
Atlanta Falcons	George Koonce	LB	East Carolina	
Chicago Bears	James Williams ^{†}	DT	Cheyney	
Chicago Bears	Eric Wright	WR	Stephen F. Austin	
Cincinnati Bengals	Joe King	S	Oklahoma State	
Dallas Cowboys	Cary Blanchard ^{†}	K	Oklahoma State	
Dallas Cowboys	Lance Zeno	C	UCLA	
Denver Broncos	Reggie Rivers	RB	Southwest Texas State	
Green Bay Packers	Brad Daluiso	K	UCLA	
Indianapolis Colts	Ed Toner	FB	Boston College	
Kansas City Chiefs	Willie Davis	WR	Central Arkansas	
Kansas City Chiefs	Lonnie Marts	LB	Tulane	
Los Angeles Raiders	Mike Jones	LB	Missouri	
Los Angeles Rams	Frank Hartley	TE	Illinois	
Los Angeles Rams	Jimmy Raye III	WR	San Diego State	
Miami Dolphins	Mike Iaquaniello	DB	Michigan State	
Miami Dolphins	Chuck Klingbeil	DT	Northern Michigan	
Miami Dolphins	Doug Pederson	QB	Northeast Louisiana	
New England Patriots	Reggie Clark	LB	North Carolina	
New Orleans Saints	Mike Keim	T	BYU	
New York Giants	Tom Rouen	P	Colorado	
Philadelphia Eagles	Brad Goebel	QB	Baylor	
Philadelphia Eagles	Pellom McDaniels	DE	Oregon State	
Pittsburgh Steelers	Garry Howe	DT	Colorado	
Pittsburgh Steelers	Shawn Vincent	DB	Akron	
Seattle Seahawks	Dedrick Dodge	S	Florida State	
Seattle Seahawks	Alex Waits	P	Texas	
Tampa Bay Buccaneers	Roger Jones	CB	Tennessee State	
Washington Redskins	James Jenkins	TE	Rutgers	

== Trades ==
In the explanations below, (D) denotes trades that took place during the 1992 Draft, while (PD) indicates trades completed pre-draft.

Round 1

Round 2

Round 3

Round 4

Round 5

Round 6

Round 7

Round 8

Round 9

Round 10

Round 11

Round 12

== Forfeited picks ==
Two selections in the 1991 draft were forfeited:
