= 1990 Oklahoma State Cowboys football team =

American college football season

1990 Oklahoma State Cowboys football
- Conference: Big Eight Conference
- Record: 4–7 (2–5 Big 8)
- Head coach: Pat Jones (7th season)
- Offensive coordinator: Jeff Bower (1st season)
- Defensive coordinator: Bill Miller (2nd season)
- Home stadium: Lewis Field

1990 Big Eight Conference football standings
	Conf.					Overall
Team	W		L		T	W		L		T
No. 1 Colorado $	7	–	0	–	0	11	–	1	–	1
No. 24 Nebraska	5	–	2	–	0	9	–	3	–	0
No. 17 Oklahoma	5	–	2	–	0	8	–	3	–	0
Iowa State	2	–	4	–	1	4	–	6	–	1
Kansas	2	–	4	–	1	3	–	7	–	1
Kansas State	2	–	5	–	0	5	–	6	–	0
Missouri	2	–	5	–	0	4	–	7	–	0
Oklahoma State	2	–	5	–	0	4	–	7	–	0
$ – Conference champion; Rankings from AP Poll

The 1990 Oklahoma State Cowboys football team represented Oklahoma State University as a member of the Big Eight Conference during the 1990 NCAA Division I-A football season. Led by seventh-year head coach Pat Jones, the Cowboys compiled an overall record of 4–7 with a mark of 2–5 in conference play, placing in a three-way tie for sixth in the Big 8. Running back Gerald Hudson ranked second among major-college players in 1990 with 1,642 rushing yards and led the country with an average of 149.3 yards per game.

Oklahoma State played home games at Lewis Field in Stillwater, Oklahoma.

== Schedule ==
Date	Time	Opponent	Site	Result	Attendance	Source
September 1	6:30 p.m.	Tulsa*	Lewis Field; Stillwater, OK (rivalry)	W 10–3	41,200	
September 8	3:00 p.m.	at Florida*	Ben Hill Griffin Stadium; Gainesville, FL	L 7–50	75,428	
September 15	6:30 p.m.	Northern Iowa*	Lewis Field; Stillwater, OK	W 33–23	36,300	
September 22	7:00 p.m.	at TCU*	Amon G. Carter Stadium; Fort Worth, TX	L 21–31	25,082	
October 6	1:30 p.m.	No. 7 Oklahoma	Lewis Field; Stillwater, OK (Bedlam Series)	L 17–31	49,800	
October 13	1:10 p.m.	at Kansas State	KSU Stadium; Manhattan, KS	L 17–23	22,856	
October 20	1:30 p.m.	at No. 4 Nebraska	Memorial Stadium; Lincoln, NE	L 3–31	76,251	
October 27	3:00 p.m.	Missouri^{†}	Lewis Field; Stillwater, OK	W 48–28	37,000	
November 3	1:30 p.m.	Kansas	Lewis Field; Stillwater, OK	L 30–31	30,100	
November 10	2:00 p.m.	at No. 4 Colorado	Folsom Field; Boulder, CO	L 22–41	51,873	
November 17	1:00 p.m.	at Iowa State	Cyclone Stadium; Ames, IA	W 25–17	36,125	
*Non-conference game; ^{†}Homecoming; Rankings from AP Poll released prior to the game; All times are in Central time; Source:

== Personnel ==
1990 Oklahoma State Cowboys football team roster
Players
Coaches
Offense

Pos.	#	Name	Class
OL		Josh Arrott
OL		Brian Bobo
RB		Vernon Brown
WR		Shannon Colbert
TE		Scott Copeland
RB		Ronnie Fisher
QB		Kenny Ford
OL		Scott Hall
RB		Gerald Hudson
WR		Charles Johnson
OL		Matt Jose
WR		Robert Kirksey
WR		Curtis Mayfield
WR		Brad McCone
WR		Brent Parker
QB		Chris Smith
OL		Pete Surette
RB		Barry Vincent
TE		Mark Walker
OL		Scott Webb
QB		Earl Wheeler
RB		Cecil Wilson

Defense

Pos.	#	Name	Class
LB		Richie Ansley
DL		George Bright
LB		Chris Calhoun
DB		Mike Clark
DB		Jay Fleischman
DL		Eric Garmond
DL		Jason Gildon
DB		Scott Harmon
DB		Terry Henley
DB		Joe King
LB		Clarence Nobles
DL		Ruben Oliver
DL		Stacey Satterwhite
DB		Charles Verner
LB		Mike Woolridge

Special teams

Pos.	#	Name	Class
K, P		Cary Blanchard

Head coach

- Pat Jones

Coordinators/assistant coaches

- Jeff Bower – Offensive coordinator/quarterback
- Bill Shimek – Running backs
- Mike Gundy – Wide receivers
- Denver Johnson – Offensive line
- Bill Miller – Defensive coordinator/defensive line
- Kenith Pope – Defensive ends
- Brent Guy – Linebackers
- Keith Armstrong – Defensive backs
- George Walstad – Special teams/assistant head coach

Legend

- (C) Team captain
- (S) Suspended
- (I) Ineligible
- Injured
- Redshirt

== Game summaries ==
=== At Florida ===
Oklahoma State Cowboys (0–0) at Florida Gators (0–0)

Quarter	1	2	3	4	Total
Oklahoma St	0	7	0	0	7
Florida	14	12	14	10	50

at Ben Hill Griffith Stadium, Gainesville, Florida

- Date: September 8, 1990
- Game attendance: 75,428
- Recap/Box Score

Game information

First quarter

- UF – Dexter McNabb 2-yard run (Arden Czyzewski kick), 13:18. Florida 7–0.
- UF – Shane Matthews 1-yard run (Arden Czyzewski kick), 3:20. Florida 14–0.

Second quarter

- OSU – Curtis Mayfield 14-yard pass from Chris Smith (Cary Blanchard kick), 13:35. Florida 14–7.
- UF – Arden Czyzewski 33-yard field goal, 10:59. Florida 17–7.
- UF – Safety, Chris Smith tackled by Huey Richardson in end zone, 5:20. Florida 19–7.
- UF – Willie McClendon 1-yard run (Arden Czyzewski kick), 3:24. Florida 26–7.

Third quarter

- UF – Tre Everett 50-yard pass from Shane Matthews (Arden Czyzewski kick), 7:45. Florida 33–7.
- UF – Willie McClendon 3-yard run (Arden Czyzewski kick), 3:14. Florida 40–7.

Fourth quarter

- UF – Arden Czyzewski 40-yard field goal, 11:34. Florida 43–7.
- UF – Darren Mickell 14-yard interception return (Arden Czyzewski kick), 9:21. Florida 50–7.

Top passers

- OSU – Chris Smith – 11/22, 81 yards, TD
- UF – Shane Matthews – 20/29, 332 yards, TD

Top rushers

- OSU – Gerald Hudson – 14 rushes, 86 yards
- UF – Errict Rhett – 7 rushes, 63 yards

Top receivers

- OSU – Curtis Mayfield – 7 receptions, 110 yards, TD
- UF – Tre Everett – 5 receptions, 123 yards, TD

External videos
- Full game (first half)
- Full game (second half)
- The Pat Jones Show

== After the season ==
The 1991 NFL draft was held on April 21–22, 1991. The following Cowboys were selected.

Round	Pick	Player	Position	NFL club
9	232	Gerald Hudson	Running back	Minnesota Vikings
10	253	Curtis Mayfield	Wide receiver	Denver Broncos
