= 1990 Missouri Tigers football team =

American college football season

1990 Missouri Tigers football
- Conference: Big Eight Conference
- Record: 4–7 (2–5 Big 8)
- Head coach: Bob Stull (2nd season)
- Offensive coordinator: Dirk Koetter (2nd season)
- Defensive coordinator: Michael Church (2nd season)
- Home stadium: Faurot Field

1990 Big Eight Conference football standings
	Conf.					Overall
Team	W		L		T	W		L		T
No. 1 Colorado $	7	–	0	–	0	11	–	1	–	1
No. 24 Nebraska	5	–	2	–	0	9	–	3	–	0
No. 17 Oklahoma	5	–	2	–	0	8	–	3	–	0
Iowa State	2	–	4	–	1	4	–	6	–	1
Kansas	2	–	4	–	1	3	–	7	–	1
Kansas State	2	–	5	–	0	5	–	6	–	0
Missouri	2	–	5	–	0	4	–	7	–	0
Oklahoma State	2	–	5	–	0	4	–	7	–	0
$ – Conference champion; Rankings from AP Poll

The 1990 Missouri Tigers football team represented the University of Missouri in the 1990 NCAA Division I-A football season. The Tigers offense scored 278 points while the defense allowed 360 points. Led by head coach Bob Stull, the Tigers finished the season unranked.

== Schedule ==
Date	Time	Opponent	Site	TV	Result	Attendance	Source
September 8	12:00 pm	TCU*	Faurot Field; Columbia, MO	Raycom	L 19–20	35,284	
September 15	1:30 pm	Utah State*	Faurot Field; Columbia, MO		W 45–10	33,986	
September 22	1:00 pm	at Indiana*	Memorial Stadium; Bloomington, IN		L 7–58	45,228	
September 29	1:30 pm	No. 21 Arizona State*	Faurot Field; Columbia, MO		W 30–9	34,825	
October 6	1:30 pm	No. 12 Colorado	Faurot Field; Columbia, MO		L 31–33	46,856	
October 13	1:30 pm	at No. 7 Nebraska	Memorial Stadium; Lincoln, NE (rivalry)		L 21–69	76,317	
October 20	1:30 pm	Kansas State^{†}	Faurot Field; Columbia, MO		W 31–21	47,181	
October 27	3:00 pm	at Oklahoma State	Lewis Field; Stillwater, OK		L 28–48	37,000	
November 3	1:00 pm	Oklahoma	Faurot Field; Columbia, MO (rivalry)		L 10–55	40,902	
November 10	1:00 pm	at Iowa State	Cyclone Stadium; Ames, IA (rivalry)		L 25–27	40,065	
November 17	1:00 pm	at Kansas	Memorial Stadium; Lawrence, KS (Border War)		W 31–21	30,000	
*Non-conference game; ^{†}Homecoming; Rankings from AP Poll released prior to the game; All times are in Central time; Source:

== Fifth Down Game ==
#12 Colorado at Missouri

Team	1	2	3	4	Total
• Buffaloes	7	7	3	16	33
Tigers	14	0	7	10	31

- Date: October 6
- Location: Faurot Field, Columbia, MO
- Game attendance: 46,856
- Referee: J. C. Louderback
- Television network: KCNC

Scoring summary
Q1	11:10	MIZ	Bailey 19-yard pass from Kiefer (Jacke kick)	MIZ 7–0
Q1	3:19	COL	Bieniemy 29-yard run (Harper kick)	Tied 7–7
Q1	1:55	MIZ	Mays 49-yard pass from Kiefer (Jacke kick)	MIZ 14–7
Q2	1:45	COL	Pritchard 68-yard run (Harper kick)	Tied 14–14
Q3	10:51	COL	Harper 35-yard FG	COL 17–14
Q3	7:30	MIZ	Jones 13-yard run (Jacke Kick)	MIZ 21–17
Q4	13:56	COL	Pritchard 70-yard pass from Johnson (Harper kick)	COL 24–21
Q4	11:11	MIZ	Jacke 45-yard FG	Tied 24–24
Q4	3:41	COL	Harper 39-yard FG	COL 27–24
Q4	2:32	MIZ	Mays 38-yard pass from Kiefer (Jacke kick)	MIZ 31–27
Q4	0:00	COL	Johnson 1-yard run (conversion failed)	COL 33–31

The Fifth Down Game is the name of a college football game that included a play that the crew officiating the game permitted to occur in error. That play enabled the Colorado Buffaloes to defeat the Missouri Tigers by scoring a touchdown on the last play of their game on October 6, 1990. The ensuing controversy cast doubt on Colorado's claim to NCAA Division I-A's 1990 national championship. It has been called one of the top memorable moments and blunders in college football history.

== Roster ==
1990 Missouri Tigers football team roster
Players
Coaches
Offense

Pos.	#	Name	Class
OT	79	Mike Bedosky	Fr
WR	4	Linzy Collins	Sr
C	50	Brad Funk	So
QB	7	Kent Kiefer	Sr
WR	6	Damon Mays	Sr
OT	74	Russ McCullough	Jr
OT	78	Rick Trumball	Sr
G	76	Don Wright	Sr

Defense

Pos.	#	Name	Class
DB	21	Harry Colon	Sr
DT	97	Mario Johnson	Jr
DE	99	Rob Harper	Sr
DT	72	George Hunt	Fr
DE	59	Rick Lyle	Fr
LB	47	Mike Ringgenberg	So

Special teams

Pos.	#	Name	Class
K	3	Jeff Jacke	So

Head coach

- Bob Stull

Coordinators/assistant coaches

- Dirk Koetter – Offensive coordinator
- Mike Ward – Running backs
- Larry Hoefer – Wide receivers
- Andy Reid – Offensive line
- Kevin Faulkner – Tight ends
- Michael Church – Defensive coordinator & linebackers
- Mo Lattimore – Defensive line
- Steve Telander – co-linebackers
- Ken Flajole – defensive backs

Legend

- (C) Team captain
- (S) Suspended
- (I) Ineligible
- Injured
- Redshirt

== 1991 NFL draft ==
Player	Position	Round	Pick	NFL club
Harry Colon	Defensive back	8	196	New England Patriots
Tim Bruton	Tight end	8	208	Indianapolis Colts
Damon Mays	Wide receiver	9	235	Dallas Cowboys
Linzy Collins	Wide receiver	12	316	Green Bay Packers
