= 1990 Colorado Buffaloes football team =

American college football season

1990 Colorado Buffaloes football

AP Poll national champion FWAA national champion NFF national champion Big Eight champion Orange Bowl champion

Orange Bowl, W 10–9 vs. Notre Dame
- Conference: Big Eight Conference

Ranking
- Coaches: No. 2
- AP: No. 1
- Record: 11–1–1 (7–0 Big 8)
- Head coach: Bill McCartney (9th season)
- Offensive coordinator: Gerry DiNardo (7th season; regular season); Gary Barnett (interim; bowl game)
- Offensive scheme: I-bone option
- Defensive coordinator: Mike Hankwitz (3rd season)
- Base defense: 3–4
- MVP: Mike Pritchard
- Captains: Joe Garten; Alfred Williams; Game captains for non-conference games
- Home stadium: Folsom Field

1990 Big Eight Conference football standings
	Conf.					Overall
Team	W		L		T	W		L		T
No. 1 Colorado $	7	–	0	–	0	11	–	1	–	1
No. 24 Nebraska	5	–	2	–	0	9	–	3	–	0
No. 17 Oklahoma	5	–	2	–	0	8	–	3	–	0
Iowa State	2	–	4	–	1	4	–	6	–	1
Kansas	2	–	4	–	1	3	–	7	–	1
Kansas State	2	–	5	–	0	5	–	6	–	0
Missouri	2	–	5	–	0	4	–	7	–	0
Oklahoma State	2	–	5	–	0	4	–	7	–	0
$ – Conference champion; Rankings from AP Poll

The 1990 Colorado Buffaloes football team represented the University of Colorado Boulder as a member of the Big Eight Conference during the 1990 NCAA Division I-A football season. The Buffaloes offense scored 338 points while the defense allowed 160 points. Led by head coach Bill McCartney, Colorado defeated Notre Dame 10–9 in the 1991 Orange Bowl to conclude the season.

Despite the infamous Fifth Down Game controversy against a 4–7 Missouri Tigers football team, Colorado was selected national champions by AP, Berryman, Billingsley, DeVold, FB News, Football Research, FW, Matthews, NFF, Sporting News, and USA/CNN, and co-champion by both FACT and NCF -all NCAA-designated major selectors. Georgia Tech took the UPI Coaches poll title, with both Washington and Miami receiving national titles from other selectors.

Georgia Tech finished the season undefeated (with its record only blemished by a tie), and subsequently split the national championship with Colorado.

The victory in the Orange Bowl was Colorado's first bowl win in nineteen years.

== Schedule ==
Date	Time	Opponent	Rank	Site	TV	Result	Attendance	Source
August 26	1:00 pm	vs. No. 8 Tennessee*	No. 5	Anaheim Stadium; Anaheim, CA (Pigskin Classic)	NBC	T 31–31	33,485	
September 6	6:00 pm	Stanford*	No. 6	Folsom Field; Boulder, CO	ESPN	W 21–17	50,669	
September 15	1:30 pm	at No. 21 Illinois*	No. 9	Memorial Stadium; Champaign, IL	ABC	L 22–23	64,351	
September 22	5:30 pm	at No. 22 Texas*	No. 20	Texas Memorial Stadium; Austin, TX	ESPN	W 29–22	75,882	
September 29	1:30 pm	No. 12 Washington*	No. 20	Folsom Field; Boulder, CO	PSN	W 20–14	52,868	
October 6	12:30 pm	at Missouri	No. 12	Faurot Field; Columbia, MO	KCNC	W 33–31	46,856	
October 13	11:30 am	Iowa State	No. 14	Folsom Field; Boulder, CO	KCNC	W 28–12	51,861	
October 20	11:00 am	at Kansas	No. 14	Memorial Stadium; Lawrence, KS	KCNC	W 41–10	40,000	
October 27	12:30 pm	No. 22 Oklahoma	No. 10	Folsom Field; Boulder, CO	CBS	W 32–23	51,967	
November 3	2:00 pm	at No. 3 Nebraska	No. 9	Memorial Stadium; Lincoln, NE (rivalry)	ESPN	W 27–12	76,464	
November 10	1:00 pm	Oklahoma State^{†}	No. 4	Folsom Field; Boulder, CO	KCNC	W 41–22	51,873	
November 17	12:10 pm	Kansas State	No. 2	Folsom Field; Boulder, CO (rivalry)	KCNC	W 64–3	51,136	
January 1, 1991	6:00 pm	No. 5 Notre Dame*	No. 1	Miami Orange Bowl; Miami, FL (Orange Bowl)	NBC	W 10–9	77,062	
*Non-conference game; ^{†}Homecoming; Rankings from AP Poll released prior to the game; All times are in Mountain time

== Rankings ==
Ranking movements Legend: ██ Increase in ranking ██ Decrease in ranking ( ) = First-place votes
	Week															
Poll	Pre	1	2	3	4	5	6	7	8	9	10	11	12	13	14	Final
AP	5 (4)	6	9	20	20	12	14	14	10	9	4 (5)	2 (5)	1 (45)	1 (41)	1 (42)	1 (39)
Coaches	5 (2)	7	9	18	16	9	11	14	8	7	3 (2)	2 (3)	1 (45)	1 (39)	1 (38)	2 (27)

== Game summaries ==
=== Vs. Tennessee ===
#5 Colorado vs. #8 Tennessee

Team	1	2	3	4	Total
Buffaloes	0	10	7	14	31
Volunteers	7	3	0	21	31

- Date: August 26
- Location: Anaheim Stadium, Anaheim, CA
- Game start: 12:05 PM
- Elapsed time: 3:43
- Game attendance: 33,458
- Game weather: 72 °F (22 °C), clear, Wind SW 8–10 mph (13–16 km/h)
- Referee: James Sprenger
- TV announcers (NBC): Don Criqui and Bill Walsh
- Source: Box score

Scoring summary
Q1	7:52	TENN	Chuck Webb 4-yard run (Burke kick)	TENN 7–0
Q2	9:55	COL	George Hemmingway 1-yard run (Harper kick)	Tied 7–7
Q2	8:09	COL	Jim Harper 35-yard field goal	COL 10–7
Q2	2:54	TENN	Greg Burke 47-yard field goal	Tied 10–10
Q3	10:49	COL	Mike Pritchard 55-yard run (Harper kick)	Tied 17–10
Q4	9:34	COL	Dave McCloughan 55-yard punt return (Harper kick)	COL 24–10
Q4	8:53	TENN	Alvin Harper 24-yard pass from Andy Kelly (Burke kick)	COL 24–17
Q4	7:11	COL	Mike Pritchard 78-yard run (Harper kick)	COL 31–17
Q4	5:36	TENN	Carl Pickens 14-yard pass from Andy Kelly (Burke kick)	COL 31–24
Q4	2:25	TENN	Chuck Webb 4-yard run (Burke kick)	Tied 31-31

Each team dominated with its offensive strength. Mike Pritchard ran for 217 yards and 2 touchdowns as Colorado outgained Tennessee 368-135 on the ground even with Eric Bieniemy sitting out due to a suspension. The Volunteers passed for 368 yards (to Colorado's 68 passing yards), and future NFL wide receivers Carl Pickens and Alvin Harper each had over 100 yards receiving and a touchdown.

=== Stanford ===
Stanford at #5 Colorado

Team	1	2	3	4	Total
Cardinal	14	0	0	3	17
• Buffaloes	0	0	14	7	21

- Date: September 6
- Location: Folsom Field, Boulder, CO
- Game start: 6:08 PM
- Elapsed time: 3:14
- Game attendance: 50,699
- Game weather: 77 °F (25 °C), partly cloudy, Wind NW 5 mph (8.0 km/h)
- Referee: Dean Cramer
- Source: Box score

Scoring summary
Q1	5:47	STAN	Palumbis 1-yard run (Hopkins kick)	STAN 7–0
Q1	4:09	STAN	Vardell 1-yard run (Hopkins kick)	STAN 14–0
Q3	8:04	COL	Eric Bieniemy 18-yard run (Harper kick)	STAN 14–7
Q3	5:09	COL	Eric Bieniemy 36-yard run (Harper kick)	Tied 14–14
Q4	4:17	STAN	Hopkins 27-yard field goal	STAN 17–14
Q4	0:12	COL	Eric Bieniemy 1-yard run (Harper kick)	COL 21-17

=== At Illinois ===
#9 Colorado at #21 Illinois

Team	1	2	3	4	Total
Buffaloes	7	10	2	3	22
• Fighting Illini	3	7	7	6	23

- Date: September 15
- Location: Memorial Stadium, Champaign, IL
- Game attendance: 64,351
- Game weather: 73 °F (23 °C), clear, Wind NW 10 mph (16 km/h)
- Referee: Tom Quinn
- Television network: ABC
- Source: Box score

Scoring summary
Q1	9:14	ILL	Doug Higgins 29-yard field goal	ILL 3–0
Q1	5:38	COL	George Hemingway 2-yard run (Harper kick)	COL 7–3
Q2	14:55	COL	Harper 54-yard field goal	COL 10–3
Q2	13:02	COL	Michael Simmons 32-yard pass from Darian Hagan (Harper kick)	COL 17–3
Q2	0:28	ILL	Elbert Turner 8-yard pass from Jason Verduzco (Higgins kick)	COL 17–10
Q3	2:28	ILL	Shawn Wax 4-yard pass from Jason Verduzco (Higgins kick)	Tied 17–17
Q3	0:24	COL	Safety, Greg Biekert tackled Griffith in end zone	COL 19–17
Q4	12:44	COL	Harper 26-yard field goal	COL 22–17
Q4	1:18	ILL	Howard Griffith 1-yard run (conversion failed)	ILL 23–22

=== At Texas ===
#20 Colorado at #22 Texas

Team	1	2	3	4	Total
• Buffaloes	7	7	0	15	29
Longhorns	10	3	6	3	22

- Date: September 22
- Location: Texas Memorial Stadium, Austin, TX
- Game start: 6:39 PM
- Elapsed time: 3:20
- Game attendance: 77,273
- Game weather: 79 °F (26 °C), Cloudy/Low Overcast, Wind NE 15–20 mph (24–32 km/h)
- Referee: Larry Fisher
- Television network: ESPN

Scoring summary
Q1	8:46	TEX	Kerry Cash 6-yard pass from Gardere (Pollak kick)	TEX 7–0
Q1	3:30	COL	George Hemingway 38-yard pass from Hagan (Harper kick)	Tied 7–7
Q1	0:16	TEX	Pollak 47-yard field goal	TEX 10–7
Q2	6:51	COL	Eric Bieniemy 2-yard run (Harper kick)	COL 14–10
Q2	1:26	TEX	Pollak 25-yard field goal	COL 14–13
Q3	4:44	TEX	Brown 2-yard run (Pass failed)	TEX 19–14
Q4	14:22	TEX	Pollak 22-yard field goal	TEX 22–14
Q4	10:10	COL	Eric Bieniemy 4-yard run (Pass failed)	TEX 22–20
Q4	5:47	COL	Eric Bieniemy 2-yard run (Harper kick)	COL 27–22
Q4	0:29	COL	Safety, Williams tackled Garder in End Zone	COL 29–22

=== Washington ===
#12 Washington at #20 Colorado

Team	1	2	3	4	Total
Huskies	7	0	7	0	14
• Buffaloes	0	3	14	3	20

- Date: September 29
- Location: Folsom Field, Boulder, CO
- Game start: 1:31 PM
- Elapsed time: 2:46
- Game attendance: 52,868
- Game weather: 55 °F (13 °C), cloudy, Wind E 3 mph (4.8 km/h)
- Referee: Dean Cramer
- Source: Box score

Scoring summary
Q1	6:25	WASH	Mark Brunell 1-yard run (Dodd kick)	WASH 7–0
Q2	0:00	COL	Harper 47-yard field goal	WASH 7–3
Q3	12:47	COL	Darian Hagan 15-yard run (Harper kick)	COL 10–7
Q3	7:22	WASH	Pierce 3-yard pass from Brunell (Dodd kick)	WASH 14–10
Q3	4:52	COL	Darian Hagan 3-yard run (Harper kick)	COL 17–14
Q4	13:05	COL	Harper 32-yard field goal	COL 20-14

=== At Missouri ===
#12 Colorado at Missouri

Team	1	2	3	4	Total
• Buffaloes	7	7	3	16	33
Tigers	14	0	7	10	31

- Date: October 6
- Location: Faurot Field, Columbia, MO
- Game start: 1:33 PM
- Elapsed time: 2:58
- Game attendance: 46,856
- Game weather: 82 °F (28 °C), partly cloudy, Wind S 15–25 mph (24–40 km/h)
- Referee: J. C. Louderback
- Television network: KCNC

Scoring summary
Q1	11:10	MIZ	Bailey 19-yard pass from Kiefer (Jacke kick)	MIZ 7–0
Q1	3:19	COL	Bieniemy 29-yard run (Harper kick)	Tied 7–7
Q1	1:55	MIZ	Mays 49-yard pass from Kiefer (Jacke kick)	MIZ 14–7
Q2	1:45	COL	Pritchard 68-yard run (Harper kick)	Tied 14–14
Q3	10:51	COL	Harper 35-yard FG	COL 17–14
Q3	7:30	MIZ	Jones 13-yard run (Jacke Kick)	MIZ 21–17
Q4	13:56	COL	Pritchard 70-yard pass from Johnson (Harper kick)	COL 24–21
Q4	11:11	MIZ	Jacke 45-yard FG	Tied 24–24
Q4	3:41	COL	Harper 39-yard FG	COL 27–24
Q4	2:32	MIZ	Mays 38-yard pass from Kiefer (Jacke kick)	MIZ 31–27
Q4	0:00	COL	Johnson 1-yard run (conversion failed)	COL 33–31

=== Iowa State ===
Iowa State at #14 Colorado

Team	1	2	3	4	Total
Cyclones	9	3	0	0	12
• Buffaloes	7	7	14	0	28

- Date: October 13
- Location: Folsom Field, Boulder, CO
- Game start: 1:32 PM
- Elapsed time: 2:46
- Game attendance: 51,861
- Game weather: 72 °F (22 °C), partly cloudy, Wind S 25–40 mph (40–64 km/h)
- Referee: John Laurie
- Source: Box score

Scoring summary
Q1	11:34	ISU	Patterson 6-yard pass from Pedersen (kick failed)	ISU 6–0
Q1	9:14	ISU	Shudak 36-yard field goal	ISU 9–0
Q1	4:55	COL	Simmons 29-yard pass from Johnson (Harper kick)	ISU 9–7
Q2	2:19	ISU	Shudak 46-yard field goal	ISU 12–7
Q2	0:06	COL	Brown 29-yard pass from Hagan (Harper kick)	COL 14–12
Q3	10:45	COL	Eric Bieniemy 1-yard run (Harper kick)	COL 21–12
Q3	0:28	COL	Pritchard 30-yard run (Harper kick)	COL 28-12

=== At Kansas ===
#14 Colorado at Kansas

Team	1	2	3	4	Total
• Buffaloes	17	3	21	0	41
Jayhawks	0	10	0	0	10

- Date: October 20
- Location: Memorial Stadium
- Game start: 12:10 PM
- Elapsed time: 2:48
- Game attendance: 40,000
- Game weather: 67 °F (19 °C), partly cloudy, Wind S 15–20 mph (24–32 km/h)
- Referee: Larry Fisher
- Source: Box score

Scoring summary
Q1	9:25	COL	Harper 36-yard field goal	COL 3–0
Q1	6:46	COL	Eric Bieniemy 31-yard run (Harper kick)	COL 10–0
Q1	0:58	COL	Mike Pritchard 44-yard pass from Darian Hagan (Harper kick)	COL 17–0
Q2	14:08	KU	Drayton 11-yard pass from Hilleary (Eichloff kick)	COL 17–7
Q2	2:47	KU	Eichloff 26-yard field goal	COL 17–10
Q2	0:01	COL	Harper 42-yard field goal	COL 20–10
Q3	10:06	COL	Eric Bieniemy 41-yard run (Harper kick)	COL 27–10
Q3	2:51	COL	Eric Bieniemy 10-yard run (Harper kick)	COL 34–10
Q3	0:18	COL	McCloughan 90-yard punt return (Harper kick)	COL 41–10

=== Oklahoma ===
#22 Oklahoma at #10 Colorado

Team	1	2	3	4	Total
Sooners	7	7	3	6	23
• Buffaloes	3	9	6	14	32

- Date: October 27
- Location: Folsom Field, Boulder, CO
- Game start: 12:31 PM
- Elapsed time: 3:23
- Game attendance: 51,967
- Game weather: 58 °F (14 °C), sunny, Wind E 8 mph (13 km/h)
- Referee: Dean Cramer
- Source: Box score

Scoring summary
Q1	9:00	OU	Cale Gundy 5-yard run (Lasher kick)	OU 7–0
Q1	3:01	COL	Harper 48-yard field goal	OU 7–3
Q2	6:58	COL	Harper 28-yard field goal	OU 7–6
Q2	6:46	OU	Long 80-yard pass from Gundy (Lashar kick)	OU 14–6
Q2	0:24	COL	Pritchard 12-yard pass from Hagan (run failed)	OU 14–12
Q3	10:19	COL	Eric Bieniemy 69-yard run (pass failed)	COL 18–14
Q3	5:06	OU	Lasher 43-yard field goal	COL 18–17
Q4	13:54	COL	Smith 85-yard pass from Hagan (Harper kick)	COL 25–17
Q4	11:24	COL	Hagan 3-yard run (Harper kick)	COL 32–17
Q4	5:51	OU	Brewer 6-yard run (run failed)	COL 32-23

=== At Nebraska ===
#9 Colorado at #3 Nebraska

Team	1	2	3	4	Total
• Buffaloes	0	0	0	27	27
Cornhuskers	0	6	6	0	12

- Date: November 3
- Location: Memorial Stadium
- Game start: 3:07 PM
- Elapsed time: 3:00
- Game attendance: 76,464
- Game weather: 38 °F (3 °C), Light rain, Wind N 20–22 mph (32–35 km/h)
- Referee: John Laurie
- TV announcers (ESPN): Sean McDonough and Mike Gottfried

Scoring summary
Q2	13:14	NEB	Barrios 26-yard field goal	NEB 3–0
Q2	11:25	NEB	Barrios 44-yard field goal	NEB 6–0
Q3	2:39	NEB	Mitchell 48-yard pass from Joseph (pass failed)	NEB 12–0
Q4	14:43	COL	Bieniemy 1-yard run (Harper kick)	NEB 12–7
Q4	8:37	COL	Bieniemy 2-yard run (pass failed)	COL 13–12
Q4	4:35	COL	Bieniemy 3-yard run (Harper kick)	COL 20–12
Q4	1:31	COL	Bieniemy 5-yard run (Harper kick)	COL 27–12

- Eric Bieniemy 38 Rush, 137 Yds, 4 TD

=== Oklahoma State ===
Oklahoma State at #4 Colorado

Team	1	2	3	4	Total
Cowboys	7	0	0	15	22
• Buffaloes	7	10	21	3	41

- Date: November 10
- Location: Folsom Field, Boulder, CO
- Game start: 1:02 PM
- Elapsed time: 3:09
- Game attendance: 51,873
- Game weather: 67 °F (19 °C), sunny, Wind NE 7 mph (11 km/h)
- Referee: John Laurie
- Source: Box score

Scoring summary
Q1	9:36	COL	Hemingway 9-yard pass from Hagan (Harper Kick)	COL 7–0
Q1	0:09	OSU	Mayfield 43 pass from Ford (Blanchard Kick)	Tied 7–7
Q2	11:28	COL	Pritchard 28-yard pass from Hagan (Harper Kick)	COL 14–7
Q2	0:03	COL	Harper 40-yard field goal	COL 17–7
Q3	10:24	COL	S.Brown 8-yard pass from Hagan (Harper Kick)	COL 24–7
Q3	7:48	COL	Pritchard 34-yard pass from Hagan (Harper Kick)	COL 31–7
Q3	0:06	COL	Bieniemy 21-yard run (Harper Kick)	COL 38–7
Q4	14:24	OSU	Hudson 1-yard run (Kirksey pass from Ford)	COL 38–15
Q4	7:36	COL	Harper 50-yard field goal	COL 41–15
Q4	3:23	OSU	Kirksey 19-yard pass from Ford (Blanchard Kick)	COL 41-22

=== Kansas State ===
Kansas State at #4 Colorado

Team	1	2	3	4	Total
Wildcats	0	3	0	0	3
• Buffaloes	17	23	3	21	64

- Date: November 17
- Location: Folsom Field, Boulder, CO
- Game start: 12:12 PM
- Elapsed time: 3:19
- Game attendance: 51,136
- Game weather: 65 °F (18 °C), partly cloudy, Wind NE 8 mph (13 km/h)
- Referee: Larry Fisher
- Source: Box score

Scoring summary
Q1	12:02	COL	Hagan 23-yard run (Harper kick)	COL 7–0
Q1	6:28	COL	Hagan 9-yard run (Harper Kick)	COL 14–0
Q1	2:53	COL	Harper 28-yard field goal	COL 17–0
Q2	12:38	KSU	Wright 28-yard field goal	COL 17–3
Q2	9:35	COL	C.S. Johnson 5-yard run (Harper kick)	COL 24–3
Q2	5:29	COL	Pritchard 48-yard pass from Hagan (Harper kick)	COL 31–3
Q2	5:11	COL	Safety, Straw sacked by Howe in endzone, KSU covered fumble	COL 33–3
Q2	0:06	COL	Pritchard 70-yard run (Harper kick)	COL 40–3
Q3	10:56	COL	Blottiaux 47-yard field goal	COL 43–3
Q4	6:54	COL	Henry 39-yard pass from Joseph (Blottiaux kick)	COL 50–3
Q4	4:35	COL	C.E. Johnson 26-yard run (Blottiaux kick)	COL 57–3
Q4	0:04	COL	Oliver 8-yard run (Blottiaux kick)	COL 64-3

The Buffs scored early and often while totaling 634 yards of total offense (360 rushing).

=== Notre Dame (Orange Bowl) ===
#5 Notre Dame vs. #1 Colorado

Team	1	2	3	4	Total
Fighting Irish	0	6	3	0	9
• Buffaloes	0	3	7	0	10

- Date: January 1
- Location: Miami Orange Bowl, Miami, FL
- Game start: 8:30 PM
- Elapsed time: 3:26
- Game attendance: 77,062
- Game weather: 76 °F (24 °C), Fair skies, Wind E 9 mph (14 km/h)
- Referee: Frank Shepard
- TV announcers (NBC): Dick Enberg and Bill Walsh
- Source: Box score

Scoring summary
Q2	12:04	CU	Jim Harper 22-yard field goal	COL 3–0
Q2	7:32	ND	Ricky Watters 2-yard run (PAT blocked)	ND 6–3
Q3	10:10	ND	Craig Hentrich 24-yard field goal	ND 9–3
Q3	4:26	CU	Eric Bieniemy 1-yard run (Harper kick)	COL 10–9

== Personnel ==
1990 Colorado Buffaloes football team roster
Players
Coaches
Offense

Pos.	#	Name	Class
C	55	Jim Adams	Jr
TB	44	David Arterberry	So
TB	31	Matt Bell	So
TB	1	Eric Bieniemy	Sr
TE	84	Jason Blatt	Fr
TE	81	Jon Boman	Jr
TB	34	Darnell Brooks	Fr
TE	32	David Brown	Sr
TE	87	Sean Brown	Jr
OT	78	Bryan Campbell	So
TB	6	Dennis Collier	So
FB	25	Robert Dobbins	Fr
TE	85	Sean Embree	So
TE	88	Christian Fauria	Fr
QB	18	Roman Foster	So
QB	10	Mike Freeman	So
G	62	Joe Garten	Sr
C	71	Erez Gottlieb	So
QB	3	Darian Hagan	Jr
WR	46	Chris Hall	Fr
OT	77	Jim Hansen	So
WR	26	Julian Hayward	So
G	79	Russ Heasley	Jr
FB	22	George Hemingway	Sr
WR	25	Mark Henry	Jr
WB		Dan Hestra	Fr
FB	33	James Hill	Fr
G	73	Roger Ivey	Fr
G	74	Dolyn Jackson	Fr
WR	84	James Jackson	Fr
WR	80	Robbie James	Jr
WR	88	Charles E. Johnson	Fr
QB	4	Charles S. Johnson	Jr
QB	1	Vance Joseph	Fr
TB	7	Kent Kahl	Fr
WR	89	Jack Keys	So
FB	38	Charles Lee	Fr
C	52	Jay Leeuwenburg	Jr
WB	23	Greg Lindsey	Fr
OT	65	Greg Loest	Fr
WB	28	Erik Mitchell	Fr
OT	70	Thomas Mixon	Fr
OT	60	Clint Moles	So
WB	5	O.C. Oliver	Sr
WB	36	J.C. Orvis	Sr
FB	49	Scott Phillips	Fr
FB	20	Kelly Phipps	Fr
WB	26	Jason Allegri	Fr
WR	9	Mike Pritchard	Sr
FB	30	Tony Senna	Jr
WB	42	Michael Simmons	Sr
WR	86	Rico Smith	Jr
TB	35	Chuck Snowden	Fr
OT	76	Ariel Solomon	Sr
C	51	Rudy Stearnes	Fr
OT	61	Chris Stortz	Fr
G	66	Dan Todd	Fr
TE	82	Doug Van Horn	Fr
OT	72	Mark Vander Poel	Sr
OT	63	Derek West	Fr
WB	12	Michael Westbrook	Fr
TB	41	Roger Yago	Sr

Defense

Pos.	#	Name	Class
DB	29	Derek Agnew	Fr
S	5	Blake Anderson	Fr
LB	90	Norm Barnett	Fr
LB	50	Tony Berti	Fr
S	30	Matthew Bickel	Fr
LB	19	Greg Biekert	So
CB	13	Ronnie Bradford	So
LB	34	Chad Brown	So
DT	59	Kenny Browne	Fr
NT	39	Jeff Brunner	Fr
LB	55	DeShannon Campbell	Fr
S	31	Spencer Colter	Jr
S	21	Dwayne Davis	So
LB	40	Scott DeGoler	Sr
DT	89	Brian Dyet	Fr
DT	97	Marcellous Elder	So
CB	2	Deon Figures	So
LB	88	Richard Fisher	Fr
CB	15	David Gibbs	Sr
LB	91	Lamarr Gray	Sr
LB	92	Rodell Guest	Jr
S	6	Eric Hamilton	So
DT	95	Garry Howe	Sr
CB	47	Chris Hudson	Fr
LB	51	Alfred Hull	Fr
LB	43	Rob Hutchins	Sr
S	17	Tim James	Sr
LB	48	Terry Johnson	Sr
LB	58	Noah Kaiser	Fr
LB	41	John Katovisch	Fr
CB	12	Dave McCloughan	Sr
LB	96	Kanavis McGhee	Sr
LB	98	Mike Motley	Sr
S	37	Tate Nelson	So
S	45	Chris O'Donnell	Jr
DT	75	Jason Perkins	So
LB	57	William Polk	So
DT	99	Leonard Renfro	Fr
LB	53	Jason Robinson	Fr
LB	46	Paul Rose	Sr
S	49	Jim Schrant	Fr
S	4	Aaron Shaw	Fr
DT	76	Corey Smith	Fr
CB	38	Scott Starr	So
NG	93	Joel Steed	Jr
LB	64	Colton Sudberry	Fr
S	27	Greg Thomas	Jr
CB	19	Ryan Thomas	Fr
CB	14	Jeff Walden	Fr
LB	94	Alfred Williams	Sr
LB	81	Dennis Williams	Fr
LB	56	Ron Woolfork	Fr

Special teams

Pos.	#	Name	Class
PK	20	Jim Archibald	Fr
PK	9	Daniel Beck	Fr
PK	23	Justin Blake	Fr
PK	14	Pat Blottiaux	So
PK	16	Jim Harper	Jr
PK	1	Branon Johnson	Fr
P	17	Jeff Kochevar	Jr
P	21	Ron Mayer	Fr
PK	85	Jason Miller	Fr
P	10	Tom Rouen	Sr

Head coach

- Bill McCartney

Coordinators/assistant coaches

- Gary Barnett
- Mike Barry
- Brian Cabral
- Gerry DiNardo
- Don Frease
- Mike Hankwitz
- Oliver Lucas
- Bob Simmons
- Ron Vanderlinden
- Jeff Madden

Legend

- (C) Team captain
- (S) Suspended
- (I) Ineligible
- Injured
- Redshirt

Roster
Last update: 2016-Jan-17

== Awards and honors ==
- Alfred Williams, Butkus Award

== Team players drafted into the NFL ==
Player	Position	Round	Pick	NFL club
Mike Pritchard	Wide receiver	1	13	Atlanta Falcons
Alfred Williams	Linebacker	1	18	Cincinnati Bengals
Eric Bieniemy	Running back	2	39	San Diego Chargers
Kanavis McGhee	Linebacker	2	55	New York Giants
Dave McCloughan	Defensive back	3	69	Indianapolis Colts
Mark Vander Poel	Tackle	4	96	Indianapolis Colts
Joe Garten	Center	6	164	Green Bay Packers
Tim James	Defensive back	8	202	New York Jets
