= Vinnie Clark =

American football player (born 1969)

No. 25, 27, 29
- Position: Cornerback

Personal information
- Born: January 22, 1969 (age 57); Cincinnati, Ohio, U.S.
- Listed height: 6 ft 0 in (1.83 m)
- Listed weight: 202 lb (92 kg)

Career information
- High school: Cincinnati (OH) Academy of Physical Education
- College: Ohio State
- NFL draft: 1991: 1st round, 19th overall pick

Career history
- Green Bay Packers (1991–1992); Atlanta Falcons (1993–1994); New Orleans Saints (1994); Jacksonville Jaguars (1995–1996)

Awards and highlights
- Second-team All-Big Ten (1990)

Career NFL statistics
- Interceptions: 13
- INT yards: 335
- Touchdowns: 1
- Stats at Pro Football Reference

Vincent Eugene Clark (born January 22, 1969) is an American former professional football player who was a cornerback in the National Football League (NFL) for the Green Bay Packers, Atlanta Falcons, New Orleans Saints, and Jacksonville Jaguars. He played college football at Ohio State University. He was selected by the Packers in the first round of the 1991 NFL draft with the 19th overall pick.

In 2005, Clark was named an assistant coach for the Arena Football League team the Columbus Destroyers. The head coach for the Destroyers was Chris Spielman, Clark's former teammate at Ohio State.
