= Dave McCloughan =

American football player (born 1966)

No. 42, 23, 44
- Position: Cornerback

Personal information
- Born: November 20, 1966 (age 59); San Leandro, California, U.S.
- Listed height: 6 ft 1 in (1.85 m)
- Listed weight: 186 lb (84 kg)

Career information
- High school: Loveland (Loveland, Colorado)
- College: Colorado
- NFL draft: 1991: 3rd round, 69th overall pick

Career history
- Indianapolis Colts (1991); Green Bay Packers (1992); Seattle Seahawks (1993–1994)

Awards and highlights
- National champion (1990)

Career NFL statistics
- Tackles: 42
- Stats at Pro Football Reference

David Kent McCloughan (born November 20, 1966) is an American former professional football player who was a cornerback in the National Football League (NFL). He played college football for the Colorado Buffaloes.

== Biography ==
McCloughan was born David Kent McCloughan, in San Leandro, California. His father was Oakland Raiders cornerback, Kent McCloughan, and his brother, Scot McCloughan, is the former general manager of the Washington Redskins.

== Career ==
McCloughan was selected in the third round of the 1991 NFL draft by the Indianapolis Colts with the 69th overall pick. He spent his first season with the team. He spent the 1992 NFL season with the Green Bay Packers before spending his final two seasons with the Seattle Seahawks. After his playing career, he became a scout for the San Francisco 49ers.

He played at the collegiate level at the University of Colorado at Boulder. While there, he was a member of the 1990 National Championship team.
