= 1990 Nebraska Cornhuskers football team =

American college football season

1990 Nebraska Cornhuskers football

Florida Citrus Bowl, L 21–45 vs. Georgia Tech
- Conference: Big Eight Conference

Ranking
- Coaches: No. T–17
- AP: No. 24
- Record: 9–3 (5–2 Big 8)
- Head coach: Tom Osborne (18th season)
- Offensive scheme: I formation
- Defensive coordinator: Charlie McBride (10th season)
- Base defense: 3–4
- Home stadium: Memorial Stadium

1990 Big Eight Conference football standings
	Conf.					Overall
Team	W		L		T	W		L		T
No. 1 Colorado $	7	–	0	–	0	11	–	1	–	1
No. 24 Nebraska	5	–	2	–	0	9	–	3	–	0
No. 17 Oklahoma	5	–	2	–	0	8	–	3	–	0
Iowa State	2	–	4	–	1	4	–	6	–	1
Kansas	2	–	4	–	1	3	–	7	–	1
Kansas State	2	–	5	–	0	5	–	6	–	0
Missouri	2	–	5	–	0	4	–	7	–	0
Oklahoma State	2	–	5	–	0	4	–	7	–	0
$ – Conference champion; Rankings from AP Poll

The 1990 Nebraska Cornhuskers football team represented the University of Nebraska–Lincoln in the 1990 NCAA Division I-A football season. The team was coached by Tom Osborne and played their home games in Memorial Stadium in Lincoln, Nebraska.

== Schedule ==
Date	Time	Opponent	Rank	Site	TV	Result	Attendance	Source
September 1	6:30 pm	Baylor*	No. 7	Memorial Stadium; Lincoln, NE	ESPN	W 13–0	76,184	
September 8	1:30 pm	Northern Illinois*	No. 10	Memorial Stadium; Lincoln, NE		W 60–14	76,043	
September 22	1:30 pm	Minnesota*	No. 8	Memorial Stadium; Lincoln, NE (rivalry)		W 56–0	76,354	
September 29	1:30 pm	Oregon State*	No. 8	Memorial Stadium; Lincoln, NE		W 31–7	76,061	
October 6	1:10 pm	at Kansas State	No. 8	KSU Stadium; Manhattan, KS (rivalry)		W 45–8	35,757	
October 13	1:30 pm	Missouri^{†}	No. 7	Memorial Stadium; Lincoln, NE (rivalry)		W 69–21	76,317	
October 20	1:30 pm	Oklahoma State	No. 4	Memorial Stadium; Lincoln, NE		W 31–3	76,251	
October 27	1:00 pm	at Iowa State	No. 4	Cyclone Stadium; Ames, IA (rivalry)		W 45–13	54,475	
November 3	3:00 pm	No. 9 Colorado	No. 3	Memorial Stadium; Lincoln, NE (rivalry)	ESPN	L 12–27	76,464	
November 10	1:00 pm	at Kansas	No. 13	Memorial Stadium; Lawrence, KS (rivalry)		W 41–9	36,000	
November 23	1:30 pm	at Oklahoma	No. 10	Oklahoma Memorial Stadium; Norman, OK (rivalry)	CBS	L 10–45	74,910	
January 1, 1991	12:30 pm	vs. No. 2 Georgia Tech*	No. 19	Florida Citrus Bowl; Orlando, FL (Florida Citrus Bowl)	ABC	L 21–45	72,328	
*Non-conference game; ^{†}Homecoming; Rankings from AP Poll released prior to the game; All times are in Central time; Source:

== Rankings ==
Ranking movements Legend: ██ Increase in ranking ██ Decrease in ranking
	Week															
Poll	Pre	1	2	3	4	5	6	7	8	9	10	11	12	13	14	Final
AP	7	10	8	8	8	8	7	4	4	3	13	11	10	19	19	24
Coaches																17

== Game summaries ==
=== Baylor ===
Baylor at Nebraska [box score]

Team	1	2	3	4	Total
Baylor	0	0	0	0	0
• Nebraska	0	6	0	7	13

- Date: September 1
- Location: Memorial Stadium, Lincoln, NE
- Game start: 6:30 PM CST
- Game attendance: 76,184

=== Northern Illinois ===
Northern Illinois at Nebraska [box score]

Team	1	2	3	4	Total
Northern Illinois	8	3	3	0	14
• Nebraska	16	10	13	21	60

- Date: September 8
- Location: Memorial Stadium, Lincoln, NE
- Game start: 1:30 PM CST
- Game attendance: 76,043

=== Minnesota ===
Minnesota at Nebraska [box score]

Team	1	2	3	4	Total
Minnesota	0	0	0	0	0
• Nebraska	14	28	14	0	56

- Date: September 22
- Location: Memorial Stadium, Lincoln, NE
- Game start: 1:30 PM CST
- Game attendance: 76,354

=== Oregon State ===
Oregon State at Nebraska [box score]

Team	1	2	3	4	Total
Oregon State	7	0	0	0	7
• Nebraska	3	0	7	21	31

- Date: September 29
- Location: Memorial Stadium, Lincoln, NE
- Game start: 1:30 PM CST
- Game attendance: 76,061

=== Kansas State ===
Nebraska at Kansas State [box score]

Team	1	2	3	4	Total
• Nebraska	3	7	14	21	45
Kansas State	2	0	0	6	8

- Date: October 6
- Location: KSU Stadium, Manhattan, KS
- Game start: 1:10 PM CST
- Game attendance: 35,757

=== Missouri ===
Missouri at Nebraska [box score]

Team	1	2	3	4	Total
Missouri	7	7	0	7	21
• Nebraska	28	17	10	14	69

- Date: October 13
- Location: Memorial Stadium, Lincoln, NE
- Game start: 1:30 PM CST
- Game attendance: 76,317

=== Oklahoma State ===
Oklahoma State at Nebraska [box score]

Team	1	2	3	4	Total
Oklahoma State	0	0	3	0	3
• Nebraska	7	0	10	14	31

- Date: October 20
- Location: Memorial Stadium, Lincoln, NE
- Game start: 1:30 PM CST
- Game attendance: 76,251

=== Iowa State ===
Nebraska at Iowa State [box score]

Team	1	2	3	4	Total
• Nebraska	3	14	21	7	45
Iowa State	10	0	0	3	13

- Date: October 27
- Location: Cyclone Stadium, Ames, IA
- Game start: 1:00 PM CST
- Game attendance: 54,475

=== #9 Colorado ===
Colorado at Nebraska [box score]

Team	1	2	3	4	Total
• #9 Colorado	0	0	0	27	27
#3 Nebraska	0	6	6	0	12

- Date: November 3
- Location: Memorial Stadium, Lincoln, NE
- Game start: 3:00 PM CST
- Game attendance: 76,464
- Game weather: Rain, 38 degrees, wind N 25 MPH
- Referee: John Laurie
- TV announcers (ESPN): Sean McDonough, Mike Gottfried and Kevin Guthrie

=== Kansas ===
Nebraska at Kansas [box score]

Team	1	2	3	4	Total
• Nebraska	7	10	10	14	41
Kansas	3	0	0	6	9

- Date: November 10
- Location: Memorial Stadium, Lawrence, KS
- Game start: 1:00 PM CST
- Game attendance: 36,000

=== Oklahoma ===
Nebraska at Oklahoma [box score]

Team	1	2	3	4	Total
Nebraska	3	0	7	0	10
• Oklahoma	0	21	14	10	45

- Date: November 23
- Location: Oklahoma Memorial Stadium, Norman, OK
- Game start: 1:30 PM CST
- Game attendance: 74,910
- TV announcers (CBS): Jim Nantz, Tim Brant and John Dockery

=== Georgia Tech ===
Nebraska vs Georgia Tech [box score]

Team	1	2	3	4	Total
Nebraska	0	14	7	0	21
• Georgia Tech	7	17	7	14	45

- Date: January 1
- Location: Citrus Bowl, Orlando, FL
- Game start: 12:30 PM CST
- Game attendance: 72,328

== Personnel ==
=== Roster ===
1990 Nebraska Cornhuskers football team roster
Players
Coaches
Offense

Pos.	#	Name	Class
IB	4	George Achola	Jr
IB	29	Scott Baldwin	So
IB	35	Troy Barnes	Fr
WB	81	Lance Bobolz	Sr
OT	76	Brian Boerboom	Jr
SE	18	Jon Bostick	Jr
IB	21	Derek Brown	Fr
OT	65	Jeff Chaney	Jr
C	55	Terris Chorney	So
OT	72	John Clarke	Jr
WB	6	Brad Devall	Sr
SE	11	Mark Dowse	Jr
QB	12	Jerry Dunlap	Sr
C	58	David Edeal	Sr
OT	73	Steve Engstrom	Sr
OT	77	Terry Eyman	Sr
IB	23	Leodis Flowers	Jr
TE	80	Chris Garrett	Jr
FB	37	Robert Glantz	Jr
QB	1	Mike Grant	Jr
QB	15	Tom Haase	Jr
WB	33	Tyrone Hughes	So
G	69	Dave Jensen	So
FB	41	Tim Johnk	Jr
QB	2	Mickey Joseph	Jr
G	62	Pat Kudrna	Jr
TE	85	Daryl Leise	Jr
FB	26	Lance Lewis	Jr
SE	19	Keith Makell	So
QB	10	Keithen McCant	Jr
FB	7	Andre McDuffy	Jr
TE	86	Johnny Mitchell	Fr
OT		Matt Morse	Fr
OT	51	Brent Pick	Sr
SE	82	Dan Pleasant	Jr
SE	16	Vernon Powell	So
WB		Kelly Prater	Jr
OT	78	Tom Punt	Sr
OT	59	Ray Reifenrath	Jr
FB	36	Matt Reynolds	So
IB	20	Terry Rodgers	Sr
C	51	Jim Scott	So
G	75	Will Shields	So
FB	25	Omar Soto	Jr
WB	22	Nate Turner	Jr
TE	88	Mike Vedral	So
OT	68	Doug Waddell	So
G	66	Jim Wanek	Jr
TE	89	William Washington	So
SE	87	Tom Werner	So
IB	32	Lamont White	Jr
G	61	Erik Wiegert	Jr
C	53	Bill Ziegelbein	Jr
G	64	Chris Zyzda	So

Defense

Pos.	#	Name	Class
OLB	34	Trev Alberts	Fr
CB	28	Eric Anderson	Sr
DT	90	Le Andre Anderson	Sr
ILB	48	Mike Anderson	Fr
ILB	39	Alvin Banks	Jr
ILB	54	Troy Branch	Fr
DT	94	Brian Brown	Jr
DT	95	Paul Brungardt	Sr
FS	8	Tyrone Byrd	So
FS	31	Steve Carmer	So
SS	17	Reggie Cooper	Sr
SS	24	Curtis Cotton	Jr
CB	45	Jon Crippen	Sr
OLB	88	Mike Croel	Sr
SS	28	Darin Duin	So
MG	97	Pat Engelbert	Jr
ILB	43	Shane Geiken	Jr
OLB	92	Corey Hedrick	Sr
CB	9	Robert Hicks	Sr
OLB	93	Travis Hill	So
MG	74	Matt Hilman	So
MG	98	Mike Jefferson	Fr
DT	67	Steve Keast	Sr
MG	63	Greg Koellner	Jr
ILB	35	Scott Kurtz	Sr
CB	3	Tyrone Legette	Jr
CB	5	Tahaun Lewis	Sr
DT	70	Jamie Liewer	So
ILB	46	Brian Mohnsen	Jr
MG	73	David Noonan	Fr
DT	72	John Parrella	So
ILB	52	Matt Penland	So
ILB	99	Mike Petko	Jr
CB	38	Bruce Pickens	Sr
FS	19	Brian Pollard	So
FS	6	John Reece	So
OLB	83	Brad Reilly	So
DT	56	Joe Sims	Sr
OLB	86	Joe Spitzenberger	Sr
OLB	87	Dan Svehla	Sr
FS	1	Will Thomas	Jr
ILB	40	Pat Tyrance	Sr
DT	57	Kenny Walker	Sr
OLB	84	Rick Wendland	Sr
OLB	96	David White	So
ILB	27	Freeman White	Jr
ILB	49	Paul Wightman	So
ILB	91	Andrew Zacharias	Jr

Special teams

Pos.	#	Name	Class
PK	44	Gregg Barrios	Sr
P/PK	13	Byron Bennett	Fr
PK	14	Jeff Lang	Fr
P	47	Mike Stigge	So

Head coach

- Tom Osborne
  18th season
  27th year at Nebraska
  Alma mater: Nebraska

Coordinators/assistant coaches

- Charlie McBride
  10th season as DC/DL coach
  14th year at Nebraska
  Alma mater: Colorado
- Kevin Steele
  2nd season as LB coach
  2nd year at Nebraska
  Alma mater: Tennessee
- Ron Brown
  4th season as WR/TE coach
  4th year at Nebraska
  Alma mater: Brown
- Dan Young
  8th season as OL/K coach
  8th year at Nebraska
  Alma mater: Reed
- Milt Tenopir
  17th season as OL coach
  17th year at Nebraska
  Alma mater: Sterling
- Tony Samuel
  5th season as OLB coach
  5th year at Nebraska
  Alma mater: Nebraska
- George Darlington
  DB coach
  18th year at Nebraska
  Alma mater: Rutgers
- Frank Solich
  8th season as RB coach
  12th year at Nebraska
  Alma mater: Nebraska
- Boyd Epley
  22nd season as S&C coach
  22nd year at Nebraska
  Alma mater: Nebraska
- Jack Pierce
  12th year at Nebraska
- Bill Busch
  1st year at Nebraska

Legend

- (C) Team captain
- (S) Suspended
- (I) Ineligible
- Injured
- Redshirt

Roster
Last update: January 17, 2011

=== Depth chart ===
Defense

FS
Tyrone Byrd
Steve Carmer
Will Thomas

OUTSIDE	INSDIE	INSDIE	OUTSIDE
Travis Hill	Mike Petko	Pat Tyrance	Mike Croel
David White; Dan Svehla	Matt Penland	Mike Anderson	Trev Alberts
Joe Spitzenberger	Troy Branch	Shane Geiken	Rick Wendland

SS
Reggie Cooper
Curtis Cotton
Ed Stewart

CB
Bruce Pickens
Robert Hicks
Jon Crippen

DE	NT	DE
Joe Sims	Pat Engelbert	Kenny Walker
Brian Brown	Greg Koellner	Le Andre Anderson
John Parrella	Mike Jefferson	Jamie Liewer

CB
Tahaun Lewis
Tyrone Legette
Eric Anderson

Offense

SE
Jon Bostick
Dan Pleasant
Mark Dowse

LT	LG	C	RG	RT
Tom Punt	Jim Wanek	David Edeal	Erik Wiegert; Will Shields	Brian Boerboom
Steve Engstrom	Jeff Chaney	Bill Ziegelbein	Dave Jensen	Terry Eyman
Brent Pick	Chris Zyzda	Terris Chorney	Scott Peterson	Ray Reifenrath

TE
Johnny Mitchell
William Washington
Chris Garrett

WB
Nate Turner
Tyrone Hughes
Brad Devall

QB
Mickey Joseph
Mike Grant
Tom Haase

RB
Leodis Flowers
Scott Bladwin
Derek Brown
Georgie Achola

FB
Lance Lewis
Omar Soto
Tim Johnk

Special teams
PK Greg Barios
P Mike Stigge

== Awards ==
Award	Name(s)
All-America	Kenny Walker
All-Big 8	Reggie Cooper, Mike Croel, Johnny Mitchell, Bruce Pickens, Tom Punt, Will Shields, Pat Tyrance, Kenny Walker

== NFL and pro players ==
The following Nebraska players who participated in the 1990 season later moved on to the next level and joined a professional or semi-pro team as draftees or free agents.

Name	Team
Trev Alberts	Indianapolis Colts
Mike Anderson	Amsterdam Admirals
Derek Brown	New Orleans Saints
Terris Chorney	Edmonton Eskimos
Reggie Cooper	Dallas Cowboys
Mike Croel	Denver Broncos
Travis Hill	Cleveland Browns
Tyrone Hughes	New Orleans Saints
Tyrone Legette	New Orleans Saints
Keithen McCant	Winnipeg Blue Bombers
Johnny Mitchell	New York Jets
John Parrella	Buffalo Bills
Bruce Pickens	Atlanta Falcons
John Reece	Kansas City Chiefs
Will Shields	Kansas City Chiefs
Joe Sims	Atlanta Falcons
Nate Turner	Buffalo Bills
Kenny Walker	Denver Broncos
David White	New England Patriots
