= Ernie Thompson (American football) =

American football player (born 1969)

No. 32, 45
- Position: Running back

Personal information
- Born: October 25, 1969 (age 57); Terre Haute, Indiana, U.S.
- Listed height: 5 ft 11 in (1.80 m)
- Listed weight: 244 lb (111 kg)

Career information
- High school: Terre Haute North (Terre Haute, Indiana)
- College: Indiana
- NFL draft: 1991: 12th round, 312th overall pick

Career history
- Los Angeles Rams (1991); Kansas City Chiefs (1993)

Career NFL statistics
- Rushing yards: 37
- Rushing average: 2.8
- Receptions: 6
- Receiving yards: 68
- Touchdowns: 1
- Stats at Pro Football Reference

Ernie Thompson (born October 25, 1969) is an American former professional football player in the National Football League (NFL) who played running back for the Los Angeles Rams in 1991 and for the Kansas City Chiefs in 1993. Thompson played college football for Indiana University and was selected by the Rams in the 12th round of the 1991 NFL draft.
