= Larry Wanke =

American football player (born 1968)

Profile
- Position: Quarterback

Personal information
- Born: April 2, 1968 (age 58); Cleveland, Ohio, U.S.
- Listed height: 6 ft 3 in (1.91 m)
- Listed weight: 220 lb (100 kg)

Career information
- High school: Benedictine (OH)
- College: Pittsburgh; John Carroll
- NFL draft: 1991: 12th round, 334th overall pick

Career history
- New York Giants (1991)*
- * Offseason or practice squad member only

Larry Wanke (/ˈwɒŋki/ WONG-kee) (born April 2, 1968) is an American former football quarterback and in the 1991 NFL draft, was Mr. Irrelevant.

== Early life ==
Wanke attended Benedictine High School in Cleveland, Ohio.

== College career ==
Wanke initially attended the University of Pittsburgh, but ultimately transferred to John Carroll University. The transfer was due to a quarterback competition at Pittsburgh and health problems of his father.

== Professional career ==
Wanke was drafted by the New York Giants in the 1991 NFL draft 334th and last overall, which earned him the title of Mr. Irrelevant. Wanke, however, never made an NFL roster.
