= Gerald Hudson =

Profile
- Position: Running back

Personal information
- Born: c. 1970; Pontiac, Michigan, U.S.
- Listed height: 5 ft 8 in (1.73 m)
- Listed weight: 199 lb (90 kg)

Career information
- College: Oklahoma State (1988–1990)

Career history
- Frankfurt Galaxy (1992)

Gerald Hudson (born c. 1970) is a former American football running back for the Oklahoma State Cowboys from 1988 to 1990. In 1989, he tallied 910 rushing yards. He ranked second among major-college players in 1990 with 1,642 rushing yards and led the country with an average of 149.3 yards per game. Hudson was drafted by the Minnesota Vikings in the ninth round of the 1991 NFL draft. He signed with the Vikings but was released before the regular season began. He played for the Frankfurt Galaxy in 1992.

== See also ==
- 1990 NCAA Division I-A football season#Rushing
