= 1990 Oklahoma Sooners football team =

American college football season

1990 Oklahoma Sooners football
- Conference: Big Eight Conference

Ranking
- AP: No. 17
- Record: 8–3 (5–2 Big 8)
- Head coach: Gary Gibbs (2nd season)
- Offensive coordinator: Larry Coker (1st season)
- Offensive scheme: Pro-style
- Defensive coordinator: Charlie Sadler (2nd season)
- Base defense: 5–2
- Captains: Scott Evans; Larry Medice; Mike Sawatzky; Chris Wilson
- Home stadium: Oklahoma Memorial Stadium

1990 Big Eight Conference football standings
	Conf.					Overall
Team	W		L		T	W		L		T
No. 1 Colorado $	7	–	0	–	0	11	–	1	–	1
No. 24 Nebraska	5	–	2	–	0	9	–	3	–	0
No. 17 Oklahoma	5	–	2	–	0	8	–	3	–	0
Iowa State	2	–	4	–	1	4	–	6	–	1
Kansas	2	–	4	–	1	3	–	7	–	1
Kansas State	2	–	5	–	0	5	–	6	–	0
Missouri	2	–	5	–	0	4	–	7	–	0
Oklahoma State	2	–	5	–	0	4	–	7	–	0
$ – Conference champion; Rankings from AP Poll

The 1990 Oklahoma Sooners football team represented the University of Oklahoma during the 1990 NCAA Division I-A football season. They played their home games at Oklahoma Memorial Stadium and competed as members of the Big Eight Conference. They were coached by second-year head coach Gary Gibbs. They were ineligible to participate in a bowl game since they were on probation, but they were allowed to be on TV.

== Schedule ==
Date	Time	Opponent	Rank	Site	TV	Result	Attendance	Source
September 8	2:30 p.m.	at No. 19 UCLA*	No. 23	Rose Bowl; Pasadena, CA	ABC	W 34–14	50,068	
September 15	1:00 p.m.	No. 13 Pittsburgh*	No. 14	Oklahoma Memorial Stadium; Norman, OK	CBS	W 52–10	71,117	
September 22	1:00 p.m.	Tulsa*	No. 11	Oklahoma Memorial Stadium; Norman, OK		W 52–10	70,235	
September 29	1:00 p.m.	Kansas	No. 9	Oklahoma Memorial Stadium; Norman, OK	PSN	W 31–17	70,095	
October 6	1:30 p.m.	at Oklahoma State	No. 7	Lewis Field; Stillwater, OK (Bedlam Series)		W 31–17	49,800	
October 13	3:00 p.m.	vs. Texas*	No. 4	Cotton Bowl; Dallas, TX (Red River Shootout)	ESPN	L 13–14	75,587	
October 20	1:00 p.m.	Iowa State^{†}	No. 16	Oklahoma Memorial Stadium; Norman, OK		L 31–33	69,112	
October 27	1:30 p.m.	at No. 10 Colorado	No. 22	Folsom Field; Boulder, CO	CBS	L 23–32	51,967	
November 3	1:00 p.m.	at Missouri		Faurot Field; Columbia, MO (rivalry)		W 55–10	40,902	
November 10	1:00 p.m.	Kansas State		Oklahoma Memorial Stadium; Norman, OK	PSN	W 34–7	69,106	
November 23	1:30 p.m.	No. 10 Nebraska		Oklahoma Memorial Stadium; Norman, OK (rivalry)	CBS	W 45–10	74,910	
*Non-conference game; ^{†}Homecoming; Rankings from AP Poll released prior to the game; All times are in Central time; Source:

== Rankings ==
Oklahoma was on probation in 1990 and ineligible to receive votes in the Coaches Poll.

Ranking movements Legend: ██ Increase in ranking ██ Decrease in ranking — = Not ranked
	Week																
Poll	Pre	1	2	3	4	5	6	7	8	9	10	11	12	13	14	15	Final
AP	22	23	14	11	9	7	4	16	22	—	—	—	—	—	22	20	17
Coaches	—	—	—	—	—	—	—	—	—	—	—	—	—	—	—	—	—

== Game summaries ==
=== Texas ===
Texas vs. #4 Oklahoma

Team	1	2	3	4	Total
• Longhorns	7	0	0	7	14
Sooners	3	7	3	0	13

- Date: October 13
- Location: Cotton Bowl, Dallas
- Game attendance: 75,587

Scoring summary
1		OU	R.D. Lashar 47 yard field goal	OU 3-0
1		TEX	Kerry Cash 8 yard pass from Peter Gardere (Michael Pollak kick)	TEX 7-3
2		OU	Dewell Brewer 9 yard run (R.D. Lashar kick)	OU 10-7
3		OU	R.D. Lashar 36 yard field goal	OU 13-7
4	2:00	TEX	Keith Cash 16 yard pass from Peter Gardere (Michael Pollak kick)	TEX 14-13

=== At Colorado ===
#22 Oklahoma at #10 Colorado

Team	1	2	3	4	Total
Sooners	7	7	3	6	23
• Buffaloes	3	9	6	14	32

- Date: October 27
- Location: Folsom Field, Boulder, CO
- Game start: 12:31 PM
- Elapsed time: 3:23
- Game attendance: 51,967
- Game weather: 58 °F (14 °C), sunny, Wind E 8 mph (13 km/h)
- Referee: Dean Cramer
- Source: Box score

Scoring summary
Q1	9:00	OU	Cale Gundy 5-yard run (Lasher kick)	OU 7–0
Q1	3:01	COL	Harper 48-yard field goal	OU 7–3
Q2	6:58	COL	Harper 28-yard field goal	OU 7–6
Q2	6:46	OU	Long 80-yard pass from Gundy (Lashar kick)	OU 14–6
Q2	0:24	COL	Pritchard 12-yard pass from Hagan (run failed)	OU 14–12
Q3	10:19	COL	Eric Bieniemy 69-yard run (pass failed)	COL 18–14
Q3	5:06	OU	Lasher 43-yard field goal	COL 18–17
Q4	13:54	COL	Smith 85-yard pass from Hagan (Harper kick)	COL 25–17
Q4	11:24	COL	Hagan 3-yard run (Harper kick)	COL 32–17
Q4	5:51	OU	Brewer 6-yard run (run failed)	COL 32-23

=== Nebraska ===
#10 Nebraska at Oklahoma

Team	1	2	3	4	Total
Cornhuskers	3	0	7	0	10
• Sooners	0	21	14	10	45

- Date: November 23
- Location: Oklahoma Memorial Stadium, Norman, Oklahoma
- Game start: 1:30 PM CST
- Game attendance: 74,910

== Roster ==
1990 Oklahoma Sooners football team roster
Players
Coaches
Offense

Pos.	#	Name	Class
QB	15	Joey Alfred	So
G	63	Mark Blodgett	Jr
TE	87	Eric Blomquist	So
G	66	Brian Brauninger	Jr
TE	86	Rickey Brady	Fr
SO	6	Dewell Brewer	Fr
SE	16	Chris Cabbiness	Sr
OL	76	James Cargill	So
QB	10	Steve Collins	So
QB	9	Tink Collins	So
TE	43	Adrian Cooper	Sr
RB	5	Greg Ervin	Jr
OL	51	Joe Ervin	So
TB	7	Rod Fisher	Jr
C	79	Eric Fultz	Jr
TB	32	Mike Gaddis (injured)	RJr
RB		Aaron Goins	Fr
SE	18	Artie Guess	Sr
QB	12	Cale Gundy	Fr
FB	3	Scott Hale	Sr
OT	70	Brandon Houston	Jr
OL	67	Chris Jensen	Jr
FB	27	Corey Johnson	Fr
SE	81	David Jourdan	Fr
G	58	Jason Keith	So
C	52	Brent Koontz	Fr
TB	1	Ike Lewis	Jr
RB	3	Ted Long	Jr
G	64	Terran Manning	Sr
RB	23	Billy McDade	Fr
FB	31	Mike McKinley	Jr
G	62	Larry Medice (C)	Sr
SE	17	Chris Melson	Jr
TE	82	Joey Mickey	So
OT	57	Jeff Miller	Sr
SE	83	John Nelson	Fr
TE	94	Jon Page	Jr
OT	73	Zarak Peters	Sr
OL	69	Steve Pettit	So
FB	33	Kenyon Rasheed	So
OL	71	Jeff Resler	Fr
G	54	Mike Sawatzky (C)	Sr
TE	80	Pete Schmitt	So
FB	36	William Steines	So
SE	11	Otis Taylor	So
TB	26	Travis Thompson	So
OL	68	Tim Vitito	Fr
C	50	Randy Wallace	Jr
OT	74	Chris Watkins	So
G	55	Steve Wigington	Fr
TB	20	Earnest Williams	Fr
G	60	Matt Wilson	Fr
G	75	Dalton Young	Jr

Defense

Pos.	#	Name	Class
DT	95	Russell Allen	Fr
DT	85	Tom Backes	Sr
NG	56	James Baldwin	So
LB	40	Reggie Barnes	So
LB	38	Randall Base	So
DE	99	Aubrey Beavers	Fr
DB	29	Jason Belser	Jr
DE	35	Frank Blevins	Sr
LB	45	Joe Bowden	Sr
DE	42	John Bradley	Jr
DB	14	Melvin Carter	So
DL	91	Ben Cavil	Fr
DB	24	Drew Christmon	Fr
LB	41	Mike Coats	Fr
LB	43	Bart Daniels	So
DB	48	Greg DeQuasie	Jr
NG	77	Stacey Dillard	Jr
DB	26	Terry Duncan	Jr
DT	78	Scott Evans (C)	Sr
LB	34	Mike Fields	Fr
DB	15	Charles Franks	Jr
DE	39	James Goode	Sr
DE	47	Tracy Gordon	Sr
LB	49	Bryan Gorka	Fr
DE	53	Tony Han	Sr
LB	37	Jay Houtman	So
DE	89	Ronn Hull	Fr
DB	25	Russell Jones	Fr
NG	96	Darrell Kirby	Sr
DT	97	Proctor Land	Jr
DB	22	Tony Levy	Jr
LB	59	John Manning	Fr
DT	46	Corey Mayfield	Jr
DB	4	Tommy O'Hara	Fr
NG	87	Shad Patrick	Fr
DB	44	Jerome Pipkins	Jr
DB	19	Terry Ray	Jr
DL	98	Broderick Roberson	Fr
DB	8	William Shankle	So
DB	21	Lance Swanson	Jr
DE	88	Trey Tippens	So
DB	28	Darnell Walker	So
DL	72	David Walsh	Jr
DB	2	Corey Warren	Fr
LB	30	Chris Wilson (C)	Jr
DB	88	Corey Wilson	Fr
DE	90	Fred Woods	Fr
DL	92	Ricky Wren	So

Special teams

Pos.	#	Name	Class
K	97	Barry Blanton	Fr
K	13	R. D. Lashar	Sr
P	84	Brad Reddell	So

Head coach

- Gary Gibbs

Coordinators/assistant coaches

- Larry Coker – Offensive coordinator
- Mike Jones – Running backs and wide receivers
- Charley North – Tight ends and special teams
- Charlie Sadler – Defensive coordinator
- John Blake – Defensive line
- Lucious Selmon – Outside linebacker and defensive end
- Bobby Proctor – Defensive backs

Legend

- (C) Team captain
- (S) Suspended
- (I) Ineligible
- Injured
- Redshirt

Roster

== Awards ==
- All-Big Eight: DB Jason Belser, LB Joe Bowden, TE Adrian Cooper, DT Scott Evans, OG Mike Sawatzky

== NFL draft ==
The following players were selected in the 1991 NFL draft following the season.

Round	Pick	Player	Position	NFL team
4	103	Adrian Cooper	Tight end	Pittsburgh Steelers
5	114	James Goode	Linebacker	Atlanta Falcons
7	169	Frank Blevins	Linebacker	Green Bay Packers
8	209	Scott Evans	Defensive tackle	Phoenix Cardinals
10	272	Tom Backes	Defensive end	Chicago Bears
