= Shawn Vincent =

American football player (born 1968)

No. 43
- Position: Defensive back

Personal information
- Born: June 2, 1968 (age 58); Bellaire, Ohio, U.S.
- Listed height: 5 ft 10 in (1.78 m)
- Listed weight: 175 lb (79 kg)

Career information
- High school: St. Clairsville (St. Clairsville, Ohio)
- College: Akron
- NFL draft: 1991: undrafted

Career history
- Pittsburgh Steelers (1991)

Career NFL statistics
- Games played: 10
- Games started: 1
- Interceptions: 2
- Stats at Pro Football Reference

Shawn David Vincent (born June 2, 1968) is an American former professional football player who was a defensive back in the National Football League (NFL). He played college football for the Akron Zips.

Vincent was born in Bellaire, Ohio. He attended St. Clairsville High School, where he was named all-conference as both quarterback and defensive back in 1986 and accepted a scholarship to play college football for the University of Akron as a defensive back. He left Akron to play for the Pittsburgh Steelers in 1991, during which he intercepted two passes from decorated quarterback Warren Moon in a single game. Vincent attended summer training with the Steelers prior to the 1992 season, but it was announced in July that he had left camp, and he was not on the 1992 final roster. He was inducted into the OVAC Hall of Fame in 2012 and the St. Clairsville High School Hall of Fame in 2013.
