= 1990 Kansas State Wildcats football team =

American college football season

1990 Kansas State Wildcats football
- Conference: Big Eight Conference
- Record: 5–6 (2–5 Big 8)
- Head coach: Bill Snyder (2nd season)
- Offensive coordinator: Del Miller (2nd season)
- Offensive scheme: Multiple
- Defensive coordinator: Bob Cope (2nd season)
- Base defense: 4–3
- Home stadium: KSU Stadium

1990 Big Eight Conference football standings
	Conf.					Overall
Team	W		L		T	W		L		T
No. 1 Colorado $	7	–	0	–	0	11	–	1	–	1
No. 24 Nebraska	5	–	2	–	0	9	–	3	–	0
No. 17 Oklahoma	5	–	2	–	0	8	–	3	–	0
Iowa State	2	–	4	–	1	4	–	6	–	1
Kansas	2	–	4	–	1	3	–	7	–	1
Kansas State	2	–	5	–	0	5	–	6	–	0
Missouri	2	–	5	–	0	4	–	7	–	0
Oklahoma State	2	–	5	–	0	4	–	7	–	0
$ – Conference champion; Rankings from AP Poll

The 1990 Kansas State Wildcats football team represented Kansas State University in the 1990 NCAA Division I-A football season. The team's head football coach was Bill Snyder. The Wildcats played their home games in KSU Stadium. 1990 saw the Wildcats finish with a record of 5–6, and a 2–5 record in Big Eight Conference play.

== Schedule ==
Date	Time	Opponent	Site	TV	Result	Attendance	Source
September 8	6:30 p.m.	Western Illinois*	KSU Stadium; Manhattan, KS		W 27–6	25,432	
September 15	1:10 p.m.	New Mexico State*	KSU Stadium; Manhattan, KS		W 52–7	19,200	
September 22	6:30 p.m.	at Northern Illinois*	Huskie Stadium; DeKalb, IL		L 35–42	14,102	
September 29	1:10 p.m.	New Mexico*	KSU Stadium; Manhattan, KS		W 38–6	22,812	
October 6	1:10 p.m.	No. 8 Nebraska	KSU Stadium; Manhattan, KS (rivalry)		L 8–45	35,757	
October 13	1:10 p.m.	Oklahoma State	KSU Stadium; Manhattan, KS		W 23–17	22,856	
October 20	1:30 p.m.	at Missouri	Faurot Field; Columbia, MO		L 10–31	47,181	
October 27	1:00 p.m.	at Kansas	Memorial Stadium; Lawrence, KS (rivalry)		L 24–27	45,000	
November 3	1:10 p.m.	Iowa State^{†}	KSU Stadium; Manhattan, KS (rivalry)		W 28–14	15,246	
November 10	1:00 p.m.	at Oklahoma	Oklahoma Memorial Stadium; Norman, OK	PSN	L 7–34	69,106	
November 17	1:10 p.m.	at No. 2 Colorado	Folsom Field; Boulder, CO (rivalry)		L 3–64	51,136	
*Non-conference game; ^{†}Homecoming; Rankings from AP Poll released prior to the game; All times are in Central time; Source:
