= Scot McCloughan =

American football executive (born 1971)

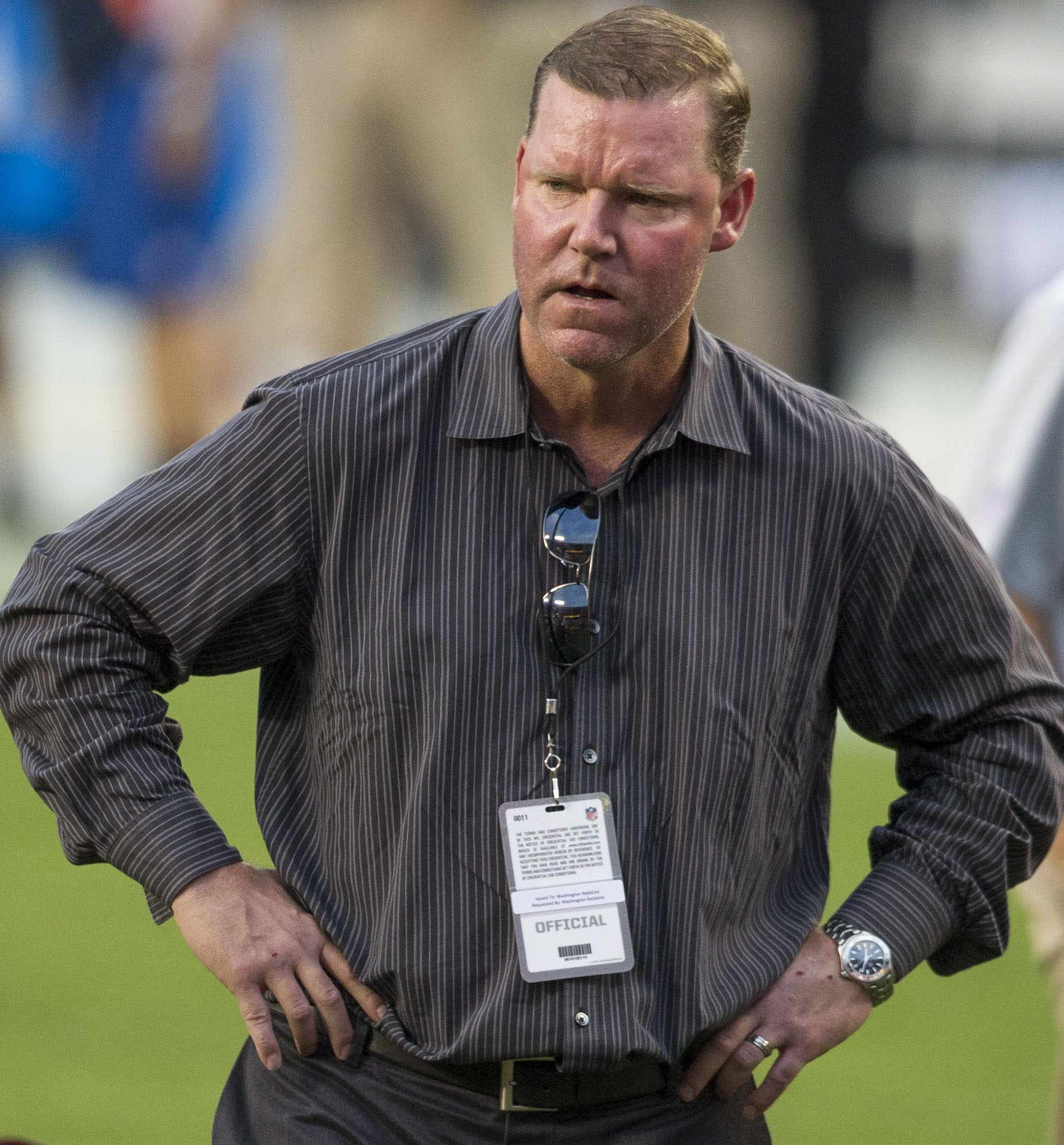
- McCloughan in 2015

Personal information
- Born: March 1, 1971 (age 55); Alameda, California, U.S.
- Listed height: 6 ft 0 in (1.83 m)

Career information
- College: Wichita State

Career history
- Green Bay Packers (1994–1999) Regional scout; Seattle Seahawks (2000–2004) Director of college scouting; San Francisco 49ers (2005–2007) Vice president of player personnel; San Francisco 49ers (2008–2009) General manager; Seattle Seahawks (2010–2013) Senior personnel executive; Washington Redskins (2015–2016) General manager

Awards and highlights
- 2× Super Bowl champion (XXXI, XLVIII)

Scot G. McCloughan (born March 1, 1971) is an American professional football executive. He was formerly the general manager of the San Francisco 49ers and Washington Redskins, as well as a senior personnel executive for the Seattle Seahawks. McCloughan played a key role in assembling rosters that led both the 49ers and Seahawks to the Super Bowl in the 2010s.

== Early life ==
McCloughan was born in Alameda, California on March 1, 1971, and grew up in Loveland, Colorado. McCloughan is the son of Kent McCloughan, who was a cornerback for the Oakland Raiders in the late 1960s, and is the brother of Dave McCloughan, who also played defensive back in the NFL. Growing up, McCloughan took an interest in scouting football players, where he and his father Kent, who was also a longtime scout for the Raiders after his playing career, would watch college player tape off a film projector in their basement.

Prior to his career in American football, McCloughan played college baseball at Wichita State and participated in a couple of College World Series with the team. He later was drafted by the New York Mets in the 10th round of the 1989 MLB draft, and the Toronto Blue Jays in the 10th round of the 1992 MLB draft, although he never played in the major league for either team. However, McCloughan did play in the minor leagues, playing outfielder for the St. Catharines Blue Jays, Hagerstown Suns, and Dunedin Blue Jays from 1992 to 1994.

== Executive career ==
Still an outfielder for the Dunedin Blue Jays in 1994, McCloughan received a call from then Green Bay Packers general manager Ron Wolf, who knew McCloughan's father from his playing days with the Oakland Raiders, and offered him a scouting job on the team. McCloughan accepted, and was a regional scout for the Packers from 1994 to 1999, where he took credit for the team drafting offensive guard Adam Timmerman, who later become a two-time Pro Bowler. He then went on to becoming the college scouting director for the Seattle Seahawks from 2000 to 2004, before joining the San Francisco 49ers in 2005 as the vice president of player personnel. In February 2008, McCloughan was promoted to general manager of the team. In March 2010, McCloughan and the 49ers agreed to a mutual termination of his contract, which was later revealed to be due to personal issues with alcoholism and an ongoing divorce.

Shortly after leaving the 49ers, McCloughan was hired by Seattle Seahawks general manager and close friend, John Schneider, to be a senior personnel executive on the team. McCloughan accepted, and later assisted with the team's drafting of notable players in later rounds of the draft such as Russell Wilson, K. J. Wright, Kam Chancellor, Richard Sherman and Byron Maxwell. He also had success in earlier rounds helping to draft players such as Earl Thomas, Russell Okung, Golden Tate, Bruce Irvin and Bobby Wagner in either the first or second round. McCloughan remained in this position until April 2014, when he again resigned due to personal issues. After he left the Seahawks, McCloughan started up his own college scouting agency in Ferndale, Washington, where he evaluated incoming draftees for a handful of NFL teams.

In January 2015, McCloughan was hired as general manager of the Washington Redskins. Despite helping build to the team to two straight winning seasons since his hiring, McCloughan was fired by the team in March 2017, again allegedly due to his issues with alcoholism. Following his departure from the team, McCloughan returned to running his scouting agency. He also worked as a consultant for the Cleveland Browns during the 2018 NFL draft, as well as for the Philadelphia Eagles from 2017 to 2019.
