= Curtis Mayfield (Canadian football) =

American gridiron football player (born 1968)

Profile
- Position: Wide receiver

Personal information
- Born: March 23, 1968 (age 58); Dallas, Texas, U.S.

Career information
- College: Oklahoma State
- NFL draft: 1991: 10th round, 253rd overall pick

Career history
- 1992: Frankfurt Galaxy
- 1994: Las Vegas Posse
- 1995: Shreveport Pirates
- 1996–1999: Saskatchewan Roughriders

Awards and highlights
- Second-team All-Big Eight (1989)

Curtis Mayfield (born March 23, 1968) is a former Canadian Football League (CFL) wide receiver who played for the Las Vegas Posse, Shreveport Pirates and Saskatchewan Roughriders.

== Professional career ==
After playing college football at Oklahoma State, Mayfield was drafted by the Denver Broncos in the tenth round of the 1991 NFL draft. He played part of the 1992 season with the Frankfurt Galaxy of the WLAF, where he caught 8 passes for 107 yards. He later moved on to Canadian Football League, where he played 17 games with the Las Vegas Posse in 1994. Hooking up with later CFL all-star Anthony Calvillo, Mayfield was one of the few bright spots in a woeful Posse season. He hauled in 61 passes for 1,202 yards and 12 touchdowns, including 319 yards on 14 receptions versus the Ottawa Rough Riders on September 3, 1994. This was the most receiving yards in a CFL regular season game in 39 years (when Hal Patterson of the Montreal Alouettes snagged 338 yards in 1956.)

Mayfield had five more productive years in the CFL, one with the Shreveport Pirates and four with the Saskatchewan Roughriders. He never caught fewer than 36 passes or 699 yards in a season, and finished his career with 301 catches for 5,276 yards and 39 touchdowns. He also added 1 kick off return and 3 punt returns (all in 1999) for touchdowns.
