= Joe Sims (American football) =

American football player (1969–2024)

No. 66, 68
- Position: Offensive tackle

Personal information
- Born: March 1, 1969; Sudbury, Massachusetts, U.S.
- Died: April 26, 2024 (aged 55)
- Listed height: 6 ft 3 in (1.91 m)
- Listed weight: 310 lb (141 kg)

Career information
- High school: Lincoln-Sudbury (Sudbury)
- College: Nebraska
- NFL draft: 1991: 11th round, 283rd overall pick

Career history
- Atlanta Falcons (1991); Green Bay Packers (1992–1994); Philadelphia Eagles (1995)*; Green Bay Packers (1995)
- * Offseason or practice squad member only

Career NFL statistics
- Games played: 53
- Games started: 20
- Fumble recoveries: 1
- Stats at Pro Football Reference

Joseph Anthony Sims (March 1, 1969 – April 26, 2024) was an American professional football player for five seasons in the National Football League (NFL). After playing college football for the Nebraska Cornhuskers, Sims was selected by the Atlanta Falcons in the 11th round of the 1991 NFL draft with the 283rd overall pick. He also played professionally for the Green Bay Packers. During his NFL career, Sims appeared in 53 games and started 20 of those.

Sims died on April 26, 2024, at the age of 55.
