= Jeff Madden =

American football coach

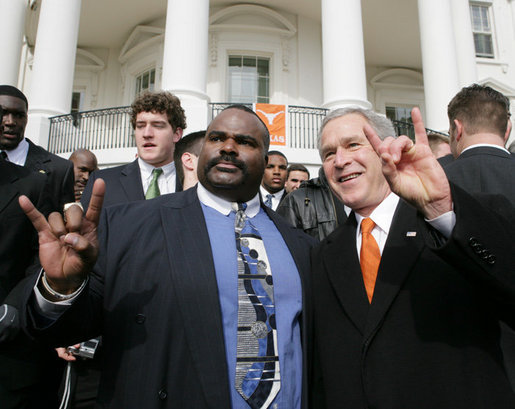
Madden gives the Hook 'em Horns with George W. Bush.

Jeff "Mad Dog" Madden was the Assistant Athletic Director for Strength & Conditioning for the college football team of the University of Texas, the Texas Longhorns. He had this role with the team from 1998 to 2014, including during the team's 2005 National Championship win.

Prior to Texas, Madden was also a coach at University of North Carolina (1993–1997), University of Colorado (1989–1992), and Rice University (1984–1988), and University of University of Cincinnati (1983).

Among his students are two Heisman Trophy winners: Rashaan Salaam and Ricky Williams.

Madden attended and graduated from Vanderbilt University in Nashville, Tennessee. He was a player for the Commodores from 1978 to 1982.
