= Harry Colon =

American football player (born 1969)

No. 40, 21, 24, 29
- Positions: Cornerback, safety

Personal information
- Born: February 14, 1969 (age 57); Kansas City, Kansas, U.S.
- Listed height: 6 ft 0 in (1.83 m)
- Listed weight: 203 lb (92 kg)

Career information
- High school: Washington (Kansas City)
- College: Missouri
- NFL draft: 1991: 8th round, 196th overall pick
- Expansion draft: 1995: 23rd round, 45th overall pick

Career history
- New England Patriots (1991); Detroit Lions (1992–1994); Jacksonville Jaguars (1995); Detroit Lions (1997)

Awards and highlights
- First-team All-Big Eight (1990)

Career NFL statistics
- Tackles: 238
- Sacks: 1
- Interceptions: 6
- Fumble recoveries: 4
- Stats at Pro Football Reference

Harry Lee Colon (born February 14, 1969) is an American former professional football player who was a defensive back in the National Football League (NFL). After playing college football for the Missouri Tigers, Colon was selected by the New England Patriots in the eighth round of the 1991 NFL draft. He played in the NFL for six years, playing for the New England Patriots (1991), the Detroit Lions (1992–1994, 1997), and the Jacksonville Jaguars (1995). He was selected by the Jacksonville Jaguars in the 1995 NFL expansion draft. He had to retire during the 1997 season due to a condition in his neck.

He now resides in Houston, Texas, where he is head coach of the football team and head of the athletics department at John H. Reagan High School.
