= Damon Mays =

American football player (born 1968)

No. 86
- Position: Wide receiver

Personal information
- Born: May 20, 1968 (age 58); Phoenix, Arizona, U.S.
- Listed height: 5 ft 9 in (1.75 m)
- Listed weight: 170 lb (77 kg)

Career information
- High school: Central (Phoenix)
- College: Missouri
- NFL draft: 1991: 9th round, 235th overall pick

Career history
- Dallas Cowboys (1991)*; Houston Oilers (1992–1993); Pittsburgh Steelers (1995); Washington Redskins (1996)
- * Offseason or practice squad member only

Career NFL statistics
- Games played: 2
- Stats at Pro Football Reference

Damon E. Mays, Jr. (born May 20, 1968) is an American former professional football player who was a wide receiver in the National Football League (NFL) for the Houston Oilers and Washington Redskins. He was selected by the Dallas Cowboys in the ninth round of the 1991 NFL draft. He played college football for the Missouri Tigers.

== Early life ==
Mays attended Central High School, where he focused on basketball. His high school football career consisted of one play on the junior varsity (a 50-yard kickoff return).

After graduating he enrolled at Scottsdale Community College, where he played pick-up football games around campus. In 1987, he walked on to the Glendale Community College football team. As a sophomore in 1988, after going 1-8 the previous season, the team had a 10-0 record and won the National Junior College Athletic Association's Championship. Mays missed 6 games with a broken collarbone, registering 7 receptions with an average of 37.5 yards per catch (school record).

The University of Missouri offered him a scholarship because of his explosive speed. As a junior in 1989, he had 26 receptions (fourth on the team) for 372 yards (second on the team) and 2 touchdowns.

As a senior in 1990, he was a part of an offense that became the most productive passing game in the Big 8 Conference history, setting records for attempts, completions and passing yards. It also set or tied 28 school passing records. Mays posted 26 receptions (fourth on the team) for 524 yards (second on the team), 5 touchdowns (tied for the team lead) and a 20.2-yard average (led the team). He had his best game against the University of Colorado, with 5 receptions for 153 yards and 2 touchdowns.

== Professional career ==
Mays was selected by the Dallas Cowboys in the ninth round (235th overall) of the 1991 NFL draft, because he was timed as the second fastest player behind Raghib Ismail. He was waived on August 20.

On May 18, 1992, he signed with the Houston Oilers who had implemented the run and shoot offense. He suffered a separated shoulder in a preseason game against the Cowboys, which put him on the injured reserve list. In 1993, he was on the inactive list for most of the season. He was released on August 22, 1994.

On April 20, 1995, he signed with the Pittsburgh Steelers. On August 21, he was placed on the injured reserve list with a shoulder injury. He was cut on August 19, 1996.

On August 20, 1996, he was claimed by the Washington Redskins, reuniting with Norv Turner who was his offensive coordinator with the Cowboys. He was declared inactive in 5 games. He was released on October 7.
