= 1990 Iowa State Cyclones football team =

American college football season

1990 Iowa State Cyclones football
- Conference: Big Eight Conference
- Record: 4–6–1 (2–4–1 Big 8)
- Head coach: Jim Walden (4th season)
- Defensive coordinator: Robin Ross (4th season)
- Home stadium: Cyclone Stadium

1990 Big Eight Conference football standings
	Conf.					Overall
Team	W		L		T	W		L		T
No. 1 Colorado $	7	–	0	–	0	11	–	1	–	1
No. 24 Nebraska	5	–	2	–	0	9	–	3	–	0
No. 17 Oklahoma	5	–	2	–	0	8	–	3	–	0
Iowa State	2	–	4	–	1	4	–	6	–	1
Kansas	2	–	4	–	1	3	–	7	–	1
Kansas State	2	–	5	–	0	5	–	6	–	0
Missouri	2	–	5	–	0	4	–	7	–	0
Oklahoma State	2	–	5	–	0	4	–	7	–	0
$ – Conference champion; Rankings from AP Poll

The 1990 Iowa State Cyclones football team represented Iowa State University as a member of the Big Eight Conference during the 1990 NCAA Division I-A football season. Led by fourth-year head coach Jim Walden, the Cyclones compiled an overall record of 4–6–1 with a mark of 2–4–1 in conference play, tying for fourth place in the Big 8. Iowa State played home games at Cyclone Stadium in Ames, Iowa.

== Schedule ==
Date	Time	Opponent	Site	TV	Result	Attendance	Source
September 8	1:00 p.m.	Northern Iowa*	Cyclone Stadium; Ames, IA		W 35–6	45,647	
September 15	1:30 p.m.	at Minnesota*	Hubert H. Humphrey Metrodome; Minneapolis, MN		L 16–20	37,108	
September 22	11:00 a.m.	at Iowa*	Kinnick Stadium; Iowa City, IA (rivalry)	ABC	L 35–45	70,389	
September 29	1:00 p.m.	Western Michigan*	Cyclone Stadium; Ames, IA		W 34–20	44,589	
October 6	1:00 p.m.	Kansas^{†}	Cyclone Stadium; Ames, IA		T 34–34	44,726	
October 13	12:30 p.m.	at No. 14 Colorado	Folsom Field; Boulder, CO	KCNC	L 12–28	51,861	
October 20	1:00 p.m.	at No. 16 Oklahoma	Oklahoma Memorial Stadium; Norman, OK		W 33–31	69,112	
October 27	1:00 p.m.	No. 4 Nebraska	Cyclone Stadium; Ames, IA (rivalry)		L 13–45	54,475	
November 3	1:10 p.m.	at Kansas State	KSU Stadium; Manhattan, KS (rivalry)		L 14–28	15,246	
November 10	1:00 p.m.	Missouri	Cyclone Stadium; Ames, IA (rivalry)		W 27–25	40,065	
November 17	1:00 p.m.	Oklahoma State	Cyclone Stadium; Ames, IA		L 17–25	36,125	
*Non-conference game; ^{†}Homecoming; Rankings from AP Poll released prior to the game; All times are in Central time; Source:

== Roster ==
1990 Iowa State Cyclones football team roster
Players
Coaches
Offense

Pos.	#	Name	Class
RB	32	Ron Wilkinson	Jr
OL	72	Gene Williams	Sr

Defense

Pos.	#	Name	Class
DB	11	Marcus Robertson	Sr

Special teams

Pos.	#	Name	Class

Head coach

- Jim Walden

Coordinators/assistant coaches

Legend

- (C) Team captain
- (S) Suspended
- (I) Ineligible
- Injured
- Redshirt

== Game summaries ==
=== At Iowa ===
Iowa State at Iowa

Team	1	2	3	4	Total
Cyclones	7	7	7	14	35
• Hawkeyes	7	10	21	7	45

- Date: September 22
- Location: Kinnick Stadium
  Iowa City, IA
- Game start: 11:00 a.m. CDT
- Game attendance: 70,389
- Television network: ABC

Scoring summary
1	IOWA	Titley 7-yard pass from Matt Rodgers (Skillett kick)	IOWA 7–0
1	ISU	Utter 1-yard run (Shudak kick)	Tied 7–7
2	IOWA	Nick Bell 28-yard run (Skillett kick)	IOWA 14–7
2	ISU	Glotfelty 7-yard pass from Utter (Shudak kick)	Tied 14–14
2	IOWA	Skillett 25-yard field goal	IOWA 17–14
3	IOWA	Matt Rodgers 5-yard run (Skillett kick)	IOWA 24–14
3	IOWA	Stewart 18-yard run (Skillett kick)	IOWA 31–14
3	IOWA	Montgomery 1-yard run (Skillett kick)	IOWA 38–14
3	ISU	Glotfelty 39-yard pass from Utter (Shudak kick)	IOWA 38–21
4	ISU	Williams 1-yard run (Shudak kick)	IOWA 38–28
4	IOWA	Montgomery 15-yard run (Skillett kick)	IOWA 45–28
4	ISU	Pederson 66-yard fumble return (Shudak kick)	IOWA 45-35

=== Nebraska ===
Nebraska at Iowa State

Team	1	2	3	4	Total
• Cornhuskers	3	14	21	7	45
Cyclones	10	0	0	3	13

- Date: October 27
- Location: Cyclone Stadium, Ames, Iowa
- Game start: 1:00 p.m. CDT
- Game attendance: 54,475
