= 1990 Kansas Jayhawks football team =

American college football season

1990 Kansas Jayhawks football
- Conference: Big Eight Conference
- Record: 3–7–1 (2–4–1 Big 8)
- Head coach: Glen Mason (3rd season)
- Offensive coordinator: Pat Ruel (3rd season)
- Home stadium: Memorial Stadium

1990 Big Eight Conference football standings
	Conf.					Overall
Team	W		L		T	W		L		T
No. 1 Colorado $	7	–	0	–	0	11	–	1	–	1
No. 24 Nebraska	5	–	2	–	0	9	–	3	–	0
No. 17 Oklahoma	5	–	2	–	0	8	–	3	–	0
Iowa State	2	–	4	–	1	4	–	6	–	1
Kansas	2	–	4	–	1	3	–	7	–	1
Kansas State	2	–	5	–	0	5	–	6	–	0
Missouri	2	–	5	–	0	4	–	7	–	0
Oklahoma State	2	–	5	–	0	4	–	7	–	0
$ – Conference champion; Rankings from AP Poll

The 1990 Kansas Jayhawks football team represented the University of Kansas a member of the Big Eight Conference during the 1990 NCAA Division I-A football season. Led by third-year head coach Glen Mason, the Jayhawks compiled an overall record of 3–7–1 with a mark of 2–4–1 in conference play, tying for fourth place in the Big 8. The team played home games at Memorial Stadium in Lawrence, Kansas. Kansas's 34–34 tie with Iowa State on October 6 was final tie in program history. The NCAA implemented overtime in 1996, eliminating the possibility of a tie.

== Schedule ==
Date	Time	Opponent	Site	TV	Result	Attendance	Source
September 1	1:00 p.m.	No. 15 Virginia*	Memorial Stadium; Lawrence, KS		L 10–59	35,000	
September 8	1:00 p.m.	Oregon State*	Memorial Stadium; Lawrence, KS		W 38–12	28,500	
September 15	3:00 p.m.	at Louisville*	Cardinal Stadium; Louisville, KY		L 16–28	35,848	
September 29	1:00 p.m.	at No. 9 Oklahoma	Oklahoma Memorial Stadium; Norman, OK	Prime	L 17–31	70,095	
October 6	1:00 p.m.	at Iowa State	Cyclone Stadium; Ames, IA		T 34–34	44,726	
October 13	3:00 p.m.	at No. 3 Miami (FL)*	Miami Orange Bowl; Miami, FL	Raycom	L 0–34	54,211	
October 20	12:00 p.m.	No. 14 Colorado	Memorial Stadium; Lawrence, KS		L 10–41	40,000	
October 27	1:00 p.m.	Kansas State^{†}	Memorial Stadium; Lawrence, KS (Sunflower Showdown)		W 27–24	45,000	
November 3	1:30 p.m.	at Oklahoma State	Lewis Field; Stillwater, OK		W 31–30	30,100	
November 10	1:00 p.m.	No. 13 Nebraska	Memorial Stadium; Lawrence, KS (rivalry)		L 9–41	36,000	
November 17	1:00 p.m.	Missouri	Memorial Stadium; Lawrence, KS (Border War)		L 21–31	30,000	
*Non-conference game; ^{†}Homecoming; Rankings from AP Poll released prior to the game; All times are in Central time; Source:

== Roster ==
1990 Kansas Jayhawks football team roster
Players
Coaches
Offense

Pos.	#	Name	Class
QB	18	Chip Hilleary
WR	6	Jim New
OT	77	Chris Perez	Jr

Defense

Pos.	#	Name	Class
DT	93	Gilbert Brown	So
CB	8	Tim Hill	Jr
DT	72	Chris Maumalanga	Fr
LB	19	Curtis Moore	Sr
DT	71	Dana Stubblefield	So
S	10	Doug Terry	Jr

Special teams

Pos.	#	Name	Class

Head coach

- Glen Mason

Coordinators/assistant coaches

Legend

- (C) Team captain
- (S) Suspended
- (I) Ineligible
- Injured
- Redshirt
