= 1990 Texas Longhorns football team =

American college football season

1990 Texas Longhorns football

SWC champion

Cotton Bowl Classic, L 3–46 vs. Miami (FL)
- Conference: Southwest Conference

Ranking
- Coaches: No. 11
- AP: No. 12
- Record: 10–2 (8–0 SWC)
- Head coach: David McWilliams (4th season)
- Offensive coordinator: Lynn Amedee (2nd season)
- Defensive coordinator: Leon Fuller (7th season)
- Home stadium: Texas Memorial Stadium

1990 Southwest Conference football standings
	Conf.					Overall
Team	W		L		T	W		L		T
No. 12 Texas $	8	–	0	–	0	10	–	2	–	0
No. 10 Houston	7	–	1	–	0	10	–	1	–	0
No. 15 Texas A&M	5	–	2	–	1	9	–	3	–	1
Baylor	5	–	2	–	1	6	–	4	–	1
Rice	3	–	5	–	0	5	–	6	–	0
TCU	3	–	5	–	0	5	–	6	–	0
Texas Tech	3	–	5	–	0	4	–	7	–	0
Arkansas	1	–	7	–	0	3	–	8	–	0
SMU	0	–	8	–	0	1	–	10	–	0
$ – Conference champion; Rankings from AP Poll

The 1990 Texas Longhorns football team represented the University of Texas at Austin as a member of the Southwest Conference (SWC) during the 1990 NCAA Division I-A football season. Led by fourth-year head coach David McWilliams, the Longhorns compiled an overall record of 10–2 with a mark of 8–0 in conference play, winning the SWC title. Texas earned a berth in the Cotton Bowl Classic, where the Longhorns lost to the Miami Hurricanes. The team played home games at Texas Memorial Stadium in Austin, Texas.

The 1990 Longhorns bounced back after consecutive losing seasons with a 10–1 record in the regular season. Fueled by what became known as the "Shock the Nation" tour, Texas won the SWC championship, with the only loss in the regular season coming at the hands of eventual national champion, Colorado. Texas defeated No. 21 Penn State to open the season and bested their historic rivals, Oklahoma, Arkansas, and Texas A&M. The Longhorns entered the Cotton Bowl Classic ranked third in the AP Poll, but lost handily to Miami, 46–3.

== Schedule ==
Date	Time	Opponent	Rank	Site	TV	Result	Attendance	Source
September 8	11:00 a.m.	at No. 21 Penn State*	No. 23	Beaver Stadium; University Park, PA	Raycom	W 17–13	85,973	
September 22	6:30 p.m.	No. 20 Colorado*	No. 22	Texas Memorial Stadium; Austin, TX	ESPN	L 22–29	75,882	
October 6	6:30 p.m.	at Rice		Rice Stadium; Houston, TX (rivalry)		W 26–10	34,800	
October 13	3:00 p.m.	vs. No. 4 Oklahoma*		Cotton Bowl; Dallas, TX (Red River Shootout)	ESPN	W 14–13	75,587	
October 20	12:00 p.m.	Arkansas	No. 19	Texas Memorial Stadium; Austin, TX (rivalry)	Raycom	W 49–17	72,657	
October 27	1:00 p.m.	SMU	No. 13	Texas Memorial Stadium; Austin, TX		W 52–3	65,128	
November 3	12:00 p.m.	at Texas Tech	No. 14	Jones Stadium; Lubbock, TX (rivalry)	Raycom	W 41–22	50,276	
November 10	6:45 p.m.	No. 3 Houston	No. 14	Texas Memorial Stadium; Austin, TX	ESPN	W 45–24	82,457	
November 17	11:00 a.m.	at TCU	No. 7	Amon G. Carter Stadium; Fort Worth, TX (rivalry)	CBS	W 38–10	39,007	
November 24	1:00 p.m.	at Baylor	No. 6	Floyd Casey Stadium; Waco, TX (rivalry)	PPV	W 23–13	45,649	
December 1	11:00 a.m.	Texas A&M	No. 5	Texas Memorial Stadium; Austin, TX (rivalry)	CBS	W 28–27	82,518	
January 1, 1991	12:30 p.m.	vs. No. 4 Miami (FL)*	No. 3	Cotton Bowl; Dallas, TX (Cotton Bowl Classic)	CBS	L 3–46	77,425	
*Non-conference game; Rankings from AP Poll released prior to the game; All times are in Central time

== Game summaries ==
=== Colorado ===
No. 20 Colorado at No. 22 Texas

Team	1	2	3	4	Total
• Buffaloes	7	7	0	15	29
Longhorns	10	3	6	3	22

- Date: October 13
- Location: Texas Memorial Stadium, Austin, TX
- Game start: 6:39 p.m.
- Elapsed time: 3:20
- Game attendance: 77,273
- Game weather: 79 °F (26 °C), Cloudy/Low Overcast, Wind NE 15–20 mph (24–32 km/h)
- Referee: Larry Fisher
- Television network: ESPN

Scoring summary
Q1	8:46	TEX	Kerry Cash 6-yard pass from Gardere (Michael Pollak kick)	TEX 7–0
Q1	3:30	COL	George Hemingway 38-yard pass from Hagan (Harper kick)	Tied 7–7
Q1	0:16	TEX	Michael Pollak 47-yard field goal	TEX 10–7
Q2	6:51	COL	Eric Bieniemy 2-yard run (Harper kick)	COL 14–10
Q2	1:26	TEX	Michael Pollak 25-yard field goal	COL 14–13
Q3	4:44	TEX	Phil Brown 2-yard run (Pass failed)	TEX 19–14
Q4	14:22	TEX	Michael Pollak 22-yard field goal	TEX 22–14
Q4	10:10	COL	Eric Bieniemy 4-yard run (Pass failed)	TEX 22–20
Q4	5:47	COL	Eric Bieniemy 2-yard run (Harper kick)	COL 27–22
Q4	0:29	COL	Safety, Williams tackled Gardere in End Zone	COL 29–22

=== Oklahoma ===
Texas vs. No. 4 Oklahoma

Team	1	2	3	4	Total
• Longhorns	7	0	0	7	14
Sooners	3	7	3	0	13

- Date: October 13
- Location: Cotton Bowl, Dallas
- Game attendance: 75,587

Scoring summary
1		OU	R.D. Lashar 47 yard field goal	OU 3-0
1		TEX	Kerry Cash 8 yard pass from Peter Gardere (Michael Pollak kick)	TEX 7-3
2		OU	Dewell Brewer 9 yard run (R.D. Lashar kick)	OU 10-7
3		OU	R.D. Lashar 36 yard field goal	OU 13-7
4	2:00	TEX	Keith Cash 16 yard pass from Peter Gardere (Michael Pollak kick)	TEX 14-13

=== Miami (FL)—Cotton Bowl Classic ===
No. 4 Miami (FL) vs. No. 3 Texas

Team	1	2	3	4	Total
• Hurricanes	12	7	14	13	46
Longhorns	0	3	0	0	3

- Date: January 1
- Location: Cotton Bowl, Dallas, TX
- Game attendance: 73,521
- Referee: Jimmy Harper (SEC)
- TV announcers (CBS): Jim Nantz, Tim Brant, and John Dockery

Scoring summary
1	8:53	MIA	Carlos Huerta 28-yard field goal	MIA 3–0
1	5:26	MIA	Carlos Huerta 50-yard field goal	MIA 6–0
1	0:11	MIA	Wesley Carroll 12-yard pass from Erickson (pass failed)	MIA 12–0
2	7:43	TEX	Michael Pollak 29-yard field goal	MIA 12–3
2	4:17	MIA	Wesley Carroll 24-yard pass from Erickson (Huerta kick)	MIA 19–3
3	11:46	MIA	Darrin Smith 34-yard interception return (Huerta kick)	MIA 26–3
3	6:09	MIA	Randal Hill 48-yard pass from Erickson (Huerta kick)	MIA 33–3
4	10:56	MIA	Randy Bethel 4-yard pass from Erickson (kick blocked)	MIA 40–3
4	9:23	MIA	Leonard Conley 26-yard run (Huerta kick)	MIA 46–3

== Personnel ==
1990 Texas Longhorns football team roster
Players
Coaches
Offense

Pos.	#	Name	Class
G	74	Sam Adams	So
OT	59	Bruce Bass	So
TE	93	David Bearden	So
QB	6	Beau Beauchamp	So
G	58	Jeff Boyd	So
TE	21	Henry Brown	Sr
RB	29	Phil Brown	Fr
QB		Wade Burnett	Jr
RB, WR	98	Dominic Cameron	Fr
WR	11	Keith Cash	Sr
TE	19	Kerry Cash	Sr
RB	34	Shane Childers	Fr
TE	83	Stephen Clark	Sr
QB	12	Steve Clements	Fr
RB	33	Deon Cockrell	Sr
G	71	Burke Collins	Jr
RB	37	Gerald Crawford	Fr
WR	2	Mike Davis	So
RB, WR	28	Tyrus Doctor	Fr
WR	48	Darrick Duke	So
RB	34	Andre Eaddy	So
OL	68	Trent Elliott	Fr
RB	7	Lemel Foreman	So
WR	16	Shane Foster	Fr
OT	69	Marc Gann	So
QB	10	Peter Gardere	So
G	64	Scott Gooch	Jr
RB	40	Butch Hadnot	Fr
TE	89	Jimmy Hakes	Fr
WR	32	Scooter Hesseltine	Fr
RB, DB	83	Eric Jackson	Fr
OL	79	Chuck Johnson	Jr
WR	3	Graylin Johnson	Jr
OT	65	Alan Luther	So
C	55	Turk McDonald	So
OT	57	David McGrath	Sr
FL		Lance McLaughlin	So
WR	22	Justin McLemore	Fr
C	77	Chad D. McMillian	Jr
G	53	Duane Miller	Sr
QB	5	Mark Murdock	Jr
WR	6	Kenny Neal	Fr
WR	4	Cosmo Palmieri	Fr
OT	67	Troy Riemer	Fr
RB	23	Chris Samuels	Sr
QB	14	Jimmy Saxton	Fr
OT	78	Charles Seafous	Sr
RB		Dan Seward	So
G	76	Shay Shafie	Jr
OT	68	Mark Smith	So
C	50	Todd Smith	Sr
OT	51	Stan Thomas	Sr
TE	84	Curtis Thrift	Jr
RB	36	Adrian Walker	So
WR	1	Johnny Walker	Sr
RB	24	Rodrick Walker	Fr
G	97	Duane Whetstone	Fr
G	70	Kevin Wiley	Sr
C	52	James Williams	Fr
RB	39	Patrick Wilson	Jr
WR, K		Cole Winters	Fr
RB	9	Rodney Woodard	So

Defense

Pos.	#	Name	Class
DB	9	Mark Berry	Jr
DE	47	Guy Bobbora	Jr
LB	41	Will Burdine	Jr
LB	13	Jason Burleson	So
DB	21	Grady Cavness	So
LB	42	Anthony Curl	So
DB	1	Timothy Day	So
DE	81	Shane Dronett	So
DT	90	Jon Feick	Fr
DB	29	David Fizell	Sr
DB		Paul Flinn	Jr
DB	4	Victor Frazier	Fr
DT	66	Roger Fritcher	Sr
DB	23	Todd Gage	So
DB	17	Willie Mack Garza	So
DE	95	Oscar Giles	Sr
DE	88	Gary Givens	Sr
DB	16	Lance Gunn	So
DE	84	Parker Hager	Jr
LB	33	Charles Harrison	Fr
LB	53	Paul Harvey	Sr
DE	31	Jeff Higgins	Jr
DE	44	Clay Howell	So
DT	94	Todd Hunt	So
DB	46	Jon Hunter	Fr
DB	25	Bubba Jacques	Jr
DT	99	Tommy Jeter	Jr
LB	60	Brian Jones	Sr
DT	96	James Lane	Fr
DB	30	James Lee	Sr
LB	91	Lorenzo Lewis	Sr
LB	61	Doug Livinston	Fr
LB	11	Chad Lucas	Fr
DB	13	Chris Malish	Jr
DB	8	Van Malone	So
DB	42	Eddy Matchette	So
LB	50	Dennis McWilliams	Fr
DB	27	Bubba Moffett	Sr
LB	64	Terry Montgomery	Jr
LB	52	Mical Padgett	Jr
DT	92	James Patton	Jr
DB	39	Michael Petru	Fr
LB	56	Boone Powell	Jr
LB	63	Chris Rapp	Fr
DB	18	Stanley Richard	Sr
DB	43	Todd Ringo	Jr
DE	45	Bo Robinson	So
DE	49	Anthony Scott	Sr
DB	38	Jerry Seade	Sr
DB	15	Kevin Smith	Jr
DB	35	Scott Spencer	Fr
DT	73	Todd Stautzenberger	Sr
DT	87	Mark Steed	Sr
LB	44	Winfred Tubbs	So
DB	26	Pascal Watty	Fr
DB	31	Anthony Willard	Jr
LB	83	Derek Wilson	Fr
DT	69	Lance Wilson	Jr
DB	36	John Woodson	Fr
DT	54	Kevin Yeaman	Fr

Special teams

Pos.	#	Name	Class
P	93	Corny Adams	Fr
K	49	Ted Barnhill	So
DS		Tim Crank	So
K	22	Craig Dickey	Fr
K	95	Jason Gunning	So
K	18	Brad King	Fr
K	94	Michael Pollak	Sr
K	98	Jason Post	So
K	43	William Toomey	So
P	80	Alex Waits	Sr
K		Tim Warner	Jr
K	91	Jason Ziegler	Fr

Head coach

- David McWilliams

Coordinators/assistant coaches

Legend

- (C) Team captain
- (S) Suspended
- (I) Ineligible
- Injured
- Redshirt

Roster

== 1991 NFL draft ==
The following players were selected in the 1991 NFL draft following the season.

Player	Position	Round	Pick	Franchise
Stanley Richard	Safety	1	9	San Diego Chargers
Stan Thomas	Tackle	1	22	Chicago Bears
Kerry Cash	Tight end	5	125	Indianapolis Colts
Keith Cash	Tight end	7	188	Washington Redskins
Johnny Walker	Wide receiver	8	203	Green Bay Packers
Brian Jones	Linebacker	8	213	Los Angeles Raiders
Chris Samuels	Running back	12	317	San Diego Chargers
Stephen Clark	Tight end	12	333	Buffalo Bills
