= 1990 All-Southwest Conference football team =

American college football all-star team

The 1990 All-Southwest Conference football team consisted of American football players chosen by various organizations for All-Southwest Conference teams for the 1990 NCAA Division I-A football season. The selectors for the 1990 season included the United Press International (UPI).

== Offensive selections ==
=== Quarterbacks ===
- David Klingler, Houston (UPI-1)(AP-1)(AP-OPOY)
- Peter Gardere, Texas (AP-2)

=== Running backs ===
- Darren Lewis, Texas A&M (UPI-1)(AP-1)
- Trevor Cobb, Rice (UPI-1), (AP-2)
- Chuck Weatherspoon, Houston (AP-1)
- Curtis Modkins, TCU (AP-2)

=== Tight ends ===
- Kelly Blackwell, TCU (UPI-1)(AP-1)
- Kerry Cash, Texas (AP-2)

=== Wide receivers ===
- Manny Hazard, Houston (UPI-1)(AP-1)
- Rodney Blackshear, Texas Tech (AP-1)(UPI-2)
- Stephen Shipley, TCU (UPI-1)(AP-2)
- Johnny Walker, Texas (UPI-2)
- Derek Russell, Arkansas (AP-2)

=== Offensive line ===
- Mike Arthur, Texas A&M (UPI-1)(AP-1)
- Matt McCall, Texas A&M (UPI-1)(AP-1)
- Mike Sullivan, TCU (UPI-1)(AP-1)
- Stan Thomas, Texas (UPI-1)(AP-1)
- Jason Jessup, Houston (UPI-1)(AP-2)
- Monte Jones, Baylor (AP-1)(UPI-2)
- Richard Segina, Rice (UPI-2)(AP-2)
- Jason Duvall, Texas Tech (AP-2)
- Chuck Johnson, Texas (AP-2)
- Mike Pappas, Texas A&M (AP-2)
- Trey Teichelman, Rice (UPI-2)
- Leroy Truitt, Houston (UPI-2)
- John Turnpaugh, Baylor (UPI-2)

== Defensive selections ==
=== Defensive lineman ===
- Santana Dotson, Baylor (UPI-1)(AP-1)
- Shane Dronett, Texas (UPI-1)(AP-1)
- Robin Jones, Baylor (UPI-1)(AP-2)
- James Patton, Texas (UPI-1)(AP-2)
- Roosevelt Collins, TCU (AP-1)
- Oscar Giles, Texas (AP-1)
- Tray Hooper, Houston (UPI-2)(AP-2)
- Reggie Howard, Baylor (UPI-2)
- Tommy Jeter, Texas (AP-2)

=== Linebackers ===
- O. J. Brigance, Rice (UPI-1)(AP-1)
- Brian Jones, Texas (UPI-1)(AP-1)
- William Thomas, Texas A&M (UPI-1)(AP-1)
- Reggie Burnette, Houston (UPI-2)(AP-2)
- Charles Rowe, Texas Tech (UPI-2)(AP-2)
- Matt Wingo, Texas Tech (UPI-2)(AP-2)
- Eric Blount, Houston (UPI-2)
- Jason Coubie, TCU (AP-2)
- Anthony Curl, Texas (AP-2)
- Curtis Hafford, Baylor (UPI-2)

=== Defensive backs ===
- Stanley Richard, Texas (UPI-1)(AP-1)
- Kevin Smith, Texas A&M (UPI-1)(AP-1)
- Mike Welch, Baylor (UPI-1)(AP-1)
- Lance Gunn, Texas (UPI-1)(AP-2)
- Jerry Parks, Houston (UPI-1)
- Tracy Saul, Texas Tech (AP-1)
- Charles Bell, Baylor (UPI-2)
- Mark Berry, Texas (AP-2)
- Grady Cavness, Texas (AP-2)
- Malcolm Frank, Baylor (AP-2)
- Sammy Walker, Texas Tech (UPI-2)

== Special teams ==
=== Placekickers ===
- Mike Pollack, Texas (UPI-1)(AP-1)
- Roman Anderson, Houston (AP-2)
- Clint Parsons, Rice (UPI-2)

=== Punters ===
- Alex Waits, Texas (UPI-1)(AP-1)
- Sean Wilson, Texas A&M (AP-2)

== Miscellaneous ==
- Offensive Player of the Year: David Klingler, Houston (UPI)(AP)
- Defensive Player of the Year: Stanley Richard, Texas (UPI)(AP)
- Coach of the Year: David McWilliams, Texas (UPI)(AP)
- Newcomer of the Year: Butch Hadnot, Texas (UPI)
- AP Offensive Newcomer of the Year - Butch Hadnot, Texas
- AP Defensive Newcomer of the Year - Quentin Coryatt, Texas A&M

== Key ==
UPI = United Press International AP = Associated Press

== See also ==
- 1990 College Football All-America Team
