= 1990 TCU Horned Frogs football team =

American college football season

1990 TCU Horned Frogs football
- Conference: Southwest Conference
- Record: 5–6 (3–5 SWC)
- Head coach: Jim Wacker (8th season)
- Home stadium: Amon G. Carter Stadium

1990 Southwest Conference football standings
	Conf.					Overall
Team	W		L		T	W		L		T
No. 12 Texas $	8	–	0	–	0	10	–	2	–	0
No. 10 Houston	7	–	1	–	0	10	–	1	–	0
No. 15 Texas A&M	5	–	2	–	1	9	–	3	–	1
Baylor	5	–	2	–	1	6	–	4	–	1
Rice	3	–	5	–	0	5	–	6	–	0
TCU	3	–	5	–	0	5	–	6	–	0
Texas Tech	3	–	5	–	0	4	–	7	–	0
Arkansas	1	–	7	–	0	3	–	8	–	0
SMU	0	–	8	–	0	1	–	10	–	0
$ – Conference champion; Rankings from AP Poll

The 1990 TCU Horned Frogs football team represented Texas Christian University (TCU) in the 1990 NCAA Division I-A football season. The Horned Frogs finished the season 5–6 overall and 3–5 in the Southwest Conference. The team was coached by Jim Wacker, in his eighth year as head coach. The Frogs played their home games in Amon G. Carter Stadium, which is located on campus in Fort Worth, Texas.

== Schedule ==
Date	Time	Opponent	Rank	Site	TV	Result	Attendance	Source
September 1	7:00 p.m.	Washington State*		Amon G. Carter Stadium; Fort Worth, TX		L 3–21	25,198	
September 8		at Missouri*		Faurot Field; Columbia, MO	Raycom	W 20–19	35,284	
September 22	7:00 p.m.	Oklahoma State*		Amon G. Carter Stadium; Fort Worth, TX		W 31–21	25,082	
September 29		at SMU		Ownby Stadium; University Park, TX (rivalry)		W 42–21	20,100	
October 6	7:00 p.m.	at No. 21 Arkansas		War Memorial Stadium; Little Rock, AR		W 54–26	51,612	
October 13		Rice		Amon G. Carter Stadium; Fort Worth, TX		W 38–28	23,704	
October 27	2:00 p.m.	Baylor	No. 24	Amon G. Carter Stadium; Fort Worth, TX (rivalry)		L 21–27	28,035	
November 3		at No. 6 Houston		Houston Astrodome; Houston, TX		L 35–56	25,725	
November 10	2:00 p.m.	Texas Tech		Amon G. Carter Stadium; Fort Worth, TX (rivalry)		L 28–40	28,730	
November 17	11:00 a.m.	No. 7 Texas		Amon G. Carter Stadium; Fort Worth, TX (rivalry)	CBS	L 10–38	39,007	
November 24	12:00 p.m.	at Texas A&M		Kyle Field; College Station, TX (rivalry)	Raycom	L 10–56	40,378	
*Non-conference game; Rankings from AP Poll released prior to the game; All times are in Central time
