= 1990 Texas A&M Aggies football team =

American college football season

1990 Texas A&M Aggies football

Holiday Bowl champion

Holiday Bowl, W 65–14 vs. BYU
- Conference: Southwest Conference

Ranking
- Coaches: No. 13
- AP: No. 15
- Record: 9–3–1 (5–2–1 SWC)
- Head coach: R. C. Slocum (2nd season)
- Offensive coordinator: Bob Toledo (2nd season)
- Offensive scheme: West Coast
- Defensive coordinator: Bob Davie (2nd season)
- Base defense: 3–4
- Home stadium: Kyle Field

1990 Southwest Conference football standings
	Conf.					Overall
Team	W		L		T	W		L		T
No. 12 Texas $	8	–	0	–	0	10	–	2	–	0
No. 10 Houston	7	–	1	–	0	10	–	1	–	0
No. 15 Texas A&M	5	–	2	–	1	9	–	3	–	1
Baylor	5	–	2	–	1	6	–	4	–	1
Rice	3	–	5	–	0	5	–	6	–	0
TCU	3	–	5	–	0	5	–	6	–	0
Texas Tech	3	–	5	–	0	4	–	7	–	0
Arkansas	1	–	7	–	0	3	–	8	–	0
SMU	0	–	8	–	0	1	–	10	–	0
$ – Conference champion; Rankings from AP Poll

The 1990 Texas A&M Aggies football team represented Texas A&M University as a member of the Southwest Conference (SWC) during the 1990 NCAA Division I-A football season. Led by second-year head coach R. C. Slocum, the Aggies compiled an overall record of 9–3–1 with a mark of 5–2–1 in conference play, tying for third place in the SWC. Texas A&M was invited to Holiday Bowl, where the Aggies defeated BYU. The team was ranked No. 15 in the final AP poll and No. 13 in the final Coaches Poll. Texas A&M played home games at Kyle Field in College Station, Texas.

== Schedule ==
Date	Time	Opponent	Rank	Site	TV	Result	Attendance	Source
September 1	3:00 p.m.	at Hawaii*	No. 13	Aloha Stadium; Halawa, HI	ESPN	W 28–13	38,237	
September 15	6:00 p.m.	Southwestern Louisiana*	No. 12	Kyle Field; College Station, TX		W 63–14	51,713	
September 22	2:00 p.m.	No. 7 (I-AA) North Texas*	No. 12	Kyle Field; College Station, TX		W 40–8	52,049	
September 29	7:00 p.m.	at LSU*	No. 11	Tiger Stadium; Baton Rouge, LA (rivalry)		L 8–17	77,703	
October 6	2:00 p.m.	Texas Tech	No. 19	Kyle Field; College Station, TX (rivalry)		W 28–24	68,593	
October 13	4:00 p.m.	at No. 12 Houston	No. 20	Houston Astrodome; Houston, TX		L 31–36	45,141	
October 20	2:00 p.m.	Baylor	No. 25	Kyle Field; College Station, TX (Battle of the Brazos)		T 20–20	61,017	
October 27	2:00 p.m.	Rice		Kyle Field; College Station, TX		W 41–15	52,158	
November 3	1:00 p.m.	at SMU		Ownby Stadium; University Park, TX		W 38–17	23,783	
November 17	1:00 p.m.	at Arkansas		Razorback Stadium; Fayetteville, AR (rivalry)	PPV	W 20–16	46,418	
November 24	12:00 p.m.	TCU		Kyle Field; College Station, TX (rivalry)	Raycom	W 56–10	40,378	
December 1	11:00 a.m.	at No. 5 Texas		Texas Memorial Stadium; Austin, TX (rivalry)	CBS	L 27–28	82,518	
December 29	7:00 p.m.	vs. No. 13 BYU*		Jack Murphy Stadium; San Diego, CA (Holiday Bowl)	ESPN	W 65–14	61,441	
*Non-conference game; Rankings from AP Poll released prior to the game; All times are in Central time

== Game summaries ==
=== Hawaii ===
	1	2	3	4	Total
#13 Texas A&M	7	7	7	7	28
Hawaii	10	0	3	0	13

=== Southwestern Louisiana ===
	1	2	3	4	Total
SW LA	7	0	7	0	14
#12 Texas A&M	28	14	14	7	63

=== North Texas ===
	1	2	3	4	Total
North Texas	2	0	3	3	8
#12 Texas A&M	0	20	20	0	40

=== LSU ===
	1	2	3	4	Total
#11 Texas A&M	0	0	0	8	8
LSU	7	3	7	0	17

=== Texas Tech ===
	1	2	3	4	Total
Texas Tech	10	7	7	0	24
#19 Texas A&M	0	14	7	7	28

=== At Houston ===
	1	2	3	4	Total
#20 Texas A&M	17	0	7	7	31
#12 Houston	16	10	10	0	36

=== Baylor ===
	1	2	3	4	Total
Baylor	6	0	7	7	20
#25 Texas A&M	6	0	7	7	20

=== Rice ===
	1	2	3	4	Total
Rice	8	7	0	0	15
Texas A&M	27	0	0	14	41

=== SMU ===
	1	2	3	4	Total
Texas A&M	3	21	14	0	38
SMU	10	7	0	0	17

=== Arkansas ===
	1	2	3	4	Total
Arkansas	16	0	0	0	16
Texas A&M	0	0	0	20	20

=== TCU ===
	1	2	3	4	Total
TCU	3	7	0	0	10
Texas A&M	35	14	0	7	56

=== Texas ===
	1	2	3	4	Total
Texas A&M	7	7	0	13	27
#5 Texas	0	14	7	7	28

=== BYU ===
	1	2	3	4	Total
Texas A&M	14	23	7	21	65
#13 BYU	7	0	7	0	14

== Roster ==
- T Brusinski
- J Gonzales
- M Kilmer
- D Lewis
- K McAfee
- D Patterson
- L Pavalas
- B Payne
- K Petty
- F Ransby
- QB Bucky Richardson
- G Salazar
- G Schorp
- R Simmons
- S Wood
- D Hall
