= Peter Gardere =

American football player (born 1969)

No. 10
- Positions: QB, P

Personal information
- Born: September 28, 1969 (age 57); Houston, Texas, U.S.
- Listed height: 6 ft 0 in (1.83 m)
- Listed weight: 195 lb (88 kg)

Career information
- High school: Robert E. Lee (Houston, Texas)
- College: Texas (1989–1992)

Career history
- 1993: Seattle Seahawks*
- 1993–94: Sacramento Gold Miners
- 1995: Memphis Mad Dogs
- * Offseason or practice squad member only

Awards and highlights
- 1990 Southwest Conference Football Champion; 1993 Southwest Conference Baseball Champion; 1993 Central II Regional Baseball Champion; 1993 Western Division Leader in Punting Average; 2010 Inductee Texas High School Football Hall of Fame

Peter Alexander Gardere (born September 29, 1969) is an American former football quarterback, famous for his four-year tenure as the Texas Longhorns quarterback in the late 1980s/early 1990s. He is the only starting quarterback on either side of the Texas-Oklahoma football rivalry to win four straight games in the Red River Rivalry. He set 10 school records and still shares the record for most interceptions thrown over a career.

== Early life ==
Born in Houston, Texas in 1969, Gardere was a two sport star at Houston Robert E. Lee High School. As a football player, Gardere passed for 5754 yards, leading the Generals to winning campaigns in 2 of his 3 starting seasons there. While at Houston Lee High School, he was selected MVP of the Houston region (1987), and won All State honors as a punter and a place kicker. In May 2010, he was inducted into the Texas High School Football Hall of Fame, in Waco, Texas. At his alma mater, he was inducted into the "Robert E. Lee Hall of Honor" by unanimous vote of the alumni committee, in December 2010. As a baseball player, he received all-District honors as a catcher and a first baseman. He was drafted by the Chicago Cubs in the 45th round of the 1988 MLB June Amateur Draft and offered a try out by them again in 1991. .

== Longhorns career ==
Gardere is both the son and grandson of varsity football players at Texas. His grandfather, George, played quarterback at Texas in 1922 and his father, George Jr., broke his neck as a Texas defensive back on the first play of the first game he played in his sophomore year in 1953. Gardere was recruited by coach David McWilliams as a quarterback for Texas and was also recruited by Michigan, Notre Dame and Penn State. Gardere ran a pro-style offense while at UT, and graduated as 1st all-time among Longhorn quarterbacks in career passing yards with 7,396 yards. As of 2025, he still ranks 6th all-time among Longhorn quarterbacks (and 6th in Southwest Conference history) in career passing yards, 5th in career completions, and is tied for 7th in career wins in games started (25) with James Brown and Marty Akins. He is also in 2nd place for the most career plays at Quarterback in Southwest Conference history.

Nicknamed "Peter the Great" by Longhorn fans, Gardere is worshiped by Texas and reviled by OU fans as the only starting quarterback on either side of the Red River Rivalry, in the 100-year history of the series, to have won 4 consecutive games against the other team. In each of those games Oklahoma was ranked and Texas was not.

Gardere started his redshirt freshman season as the backup to Mark Murdock, but he became the starter in the 4th game of the year against Rice. In that game he rallied the Longhorns to a 14-point 2nd half comeback, scoring the game-winning touchdown with 4 minutes left. Gardere followed that with back-to-back wins over #15 Oklahoma in the annual Red River Shootout and over #7 Arkansas in Fayetteville, leading the team to a #22 ranking. Gardere performed well in these games, combining to go 31–43 passing with two passing touchdowns against one interception. But three losses over the next four games, including a 50-7 loss to Baylor, their first win in Austin since 1951, ruined Texas' season. Donovan Forbes, also a multi-sport star from a Houston area high school, Baytown Sterling, and making his only start for Texas, replaced an injured Gardere for the final game of the year, a 21-10 loss to Texas A&M. Gardere had a 4-3 record on the year, and threw 5 touchdowns and 13 interceptions. The team finished 5-6 with a 4-4 record in the Southwest Conference, tied for fifth with Baylor.

Going into the1990 season, many expected it to be his last as starter and that redshirt freshman Steve Clements would usurp him in the following year. But Clements transferred to BYU and Gardere started every game for the Longhorns for the next two seasons.

In 1990 Gardere led the Longhorns to the Southwest Conference title, a #3 ranking and the 1991 Cotton Bowl, where the Longhorns lost to Miami 46–3. The Longhorns pulled off upsets against then #21 Penn State, #4 Oklahoma and #3 Houston. He was named 2nd Team AP All-Southwest Conference for his efforts that year.

In 1991 the team went 5-6, in a season for which the only highlight was a 10-7 upset of #6 Oklahoma.

In 1992, under new head coach John Mackovic, the team went 6-5 upset #16 Oklahoma, but also lost to TCU, breaking a 24-game win streak—the 13th longest in college football history. After beating Oklahoma the fourth time, Oklahoma fans broke out in to cheers of "Graduate! Graduate!". He was named the team's MVP for the year. He finished his career with a record of 25-16 as a starter.

After his senior year of football was over, Gardere played outfield for the University of Texas baseball team for one season. The team went to the 1993 College World Series losing in the second round. A 9-4 loss to Oklahoma, when a Gardere error broke the game open, marked the only time he would lose to Oklahoma. Ironically, Texas was ranked #1 and Oklahoma was unranked.

=== Records ===
- UT - Passing yards by a freshman, season (1,511), surpassed by Shea Morenz in 1993
- UT - Passing yards, season (2364), surpassed by James Brown in 1995
- UT - Passing yards, career (7,396), surpassed by Brown in 1997
- UT - Highest Completion Percentage (min 100 attempts) (57.52%), season, surpassed by Major Applewhite in 1999
- UT - Total offense, career (7,409), surpassed by Brown in 1997
- UT - Fastest to 1,000 yards in a single season (5 games), tied Bret Stafford, tied by Morenz, surpassed by Brown in 1995
- UT - Fastest to 2,000 yards in a single season (9 games), tied by Brown, surpassed by Applewhite in 1999
- UT - Starts, career (41), surpassed by Colt McCoy in 2009
- UT - Games by a quarterback, career (44), surpassed by Applewhite in 2001
- UT - Attempts, season (298), surpassed by Applewhite in 1999
- UT - Attempts, career (1025), surpassed by Applewhite in 2001
- UT - Completions, game (24), tied by Morenz in 1993, surpassed by Brown in 1996
- UT - Completions, season (166), surpassed by Morenz in 1993
- UT - Completions, career (561), surpassed by Applewhite in 2001
- UT - Lowest percentage of passes intercepted (minimum 300 passes), career (4.5%), surpassed by Brown in 1997
- **UT - Interceptions, career (45), tied by McCoy 2009**
- UT - Touchdown passes, game (4), tied Rick McIvor, Randy McEachern, Clyde Littlefield; surpassed by Brown in 1994
- UT - Touchdown passes, career (37), surpassed by Brown in 1997

Bold means still active

== Professional career ==
After graduation in 1992, Gardere got a training camp invitation with the Seattle Seahawks in 1993. He was beaten out for the punter position by Rick Tuten, who became a Pro Bowl player. But two days after being cut by Seattle, Gardere was punting for the Sacramento Gold Miners of the Canadian Football League. He was the West Division's leading punter that year. He played one more year Sacramento and then another for the Memphis Mad Dogs. He was often listed as a Punter/Quarterback, but he never took a snap in the CFL. In 1996, he tried out for the New Orleans Saints, but was cut in training camp and retired from football.

Gardere returned to Austin in 1997 and was the passing coach and stand-in for stars James Van Der Beek and Paul Walker in the 1999 movie Varsity Blues, filmed in Austin. He briefly worked as recruiter of NFL prospects for a sports agent company in Austin.

He is currently a commercial real estate portfolio manager in Austin, Texas.
