= Keith Cash =

American football player (born 1969)

No. 85, 89
- Positions: Tight end, split end

Personal information
- Born: August 7, 1969 (age 57); San Antonio, Texas, U.S.
- Listed height: 6 ft 4 in (1.93 m)
- Listed weight: 248 lb (112 kg)

Career information
- High school: Holmes (San Antonio)
- College: Texas
- NFL draft: 1991: 7th round, 188th overall pick

Career history
- Washington Redskins (1991)*; Pittsburgh Steelers (1991); Kansas City Chiefs (1992–1996)
- * Offseason or practice squad member only

Awards and highlights
- Astro-Bluebonnet Bowl champion - 1987

Career NFL statistics
- Receptions: 118
- Receiving yards: 1,136
- Receiving touchdowns: 10
- Stats at Pro Football Reference

Keith Lovell Cash (born August 7, 1969) is an American former professional football player who was a tight end in the National Football League (NFL). He played six seasons in the NFL, one for the Pittsburgh Steelers and five for the Kansas City Chiefs. He played college football as a wide receiver for the Texas Longhorns, catching a total of 56 passes for 921 yards, 11 touchdowns, and had 2 incompletions credited as touchdowns over four seasons. He is best remembered at UT for catching the game-winning touchdown pass on 4th down from Texas quarterback Peter Gardere in a rivalry game against Oklahoma which enabled UT to win the game 14–13 in 1990.

== Early life ==
Cash was born in San Antonio, TX. He has a twin brother, Kerry Cash, who played football with him in middle school, high school and at Texas - where he was an All-American tight end - and who also played in the NFL.

Keith and Kerry Cash attended Pease Middle School in San Antonio, where they won the district championship in football, basketball, and track in 1982–1983.

As high school athletes, Keith and Kerry Cash led Oliver Wendell Holmes High School in San Antonio, Texas, to the 5A state semi-finals in football against Houston Yates in 1985 and to the 5A Texas state championship game in basketball in 1987. Keith excelled in track and field as well, winning the district championship in the 200 meters and the high jump in 1987, He was an All-American high jumper in high school and made the All State team.

He was named one of UPI's top 100 high school football prospects in 1987 and, with his brother and teammate Johnny Walker, signed with Texas.

== College career ==
Cash played college football at the University of Texas at Austin from 1987 to 1990.

Through his first three seasons, Cash was a back-up who saw limited touches, racking up 316 yards on 22 catches. He helped the team to win the 1987 Astro-Bluebonnet Bowl in his freshman year, but the team struggled for the next two seasons.

In his senior year, he helped Texas to win the Southwest Conference Championship and to stay in the National Championship hunt through the whole season culminating in the 1991 Cotton Bowl loss to Miami. He scored a 2-point conversion in an upset victory over Penn State to start the year. Against Oklahoma he had a game-winning touchdown pass to help Texas beat the Sooners 14-13. Against #3 Houston, he had a 154-yard receiving game, including a 64 yard reception, that was the 9th-most single game receiving yards in school history at the time and helping the team to an upset victory. Against Texas A&M he had a critical TD pass at the end of the first half that tied the game in what would eventually be a close 28-27 win. He finished the season in the top 10 in the Southwest Conference for yards per receptions (18.3) and TD Receptions (with 6) and with 605 receiving yards on 33 receptions.

== Professional career ==
Cash was selected by the Washington Redskins in the seventh round of the 1991 NFL draft with the 188th overall pick, but was released before the start of the season.

He signed on to Pittsburgh's practice squad a couple of weeks after being released by the Redskins and in November he was elevated to the roster. He played in five games with them, catching 7 passes for 90 yards, including a touchdown in a 17-10 win over the Bengals.

In the offseason, Pittsburgh made Cash a Plan B Free Agent. He signed with the Chiefs a few weeks later, was not claimed by the Steelers, and spent the rest of his career in Kansas City. His best season was in 1995, when he caught 42 passes for 419 yards.

In a 1992 preseason game, the Chiefs played against Kerry Cash's Colts marking the first time identical twins played against each other in an NFL game. On one special teams play they even lined up across from one another. Later they both agreed that Keith had gotten the better of Kerry on that play.

Two of his most memorable NFL receptions were touchdown passes from Joe Montana. One was in Montana's first game against his former team, the San Francisco 49ers. The other was a 7-yard pass which was the Chiefs' first touchdown in a 28–20 divisional round victory over the Houston Oilers at the Astrodome on January 16, 1994. Cash finished the play by firing the football at an image of Oilers defensive coordinator Buddy Ryan's face on a banner hanging beyond the end zone. Holding no grudge against Ryan, he explained, "I saw it as I was crossing the goal line, and it was just impulse. I just let it fly."

He helped the Chiefs make the playoffs 4 years in a row, including 1993-94 when he led the league in playoff receptions. That year he helped the Chiefs win their division and make a run in the playoffs, including a game won off of a punt that Cash blocked, all the way to the AFC Championship game. In 1995, he helped the Chiefs win their division again and earn the #1 seed in the AFC, but they were upset by the Colts in their first game. He became a free agent in the offseason after the 1996-97 season.

== Later life ==
In 1999, Keith and his brother Kerry served as General Managers of the Texas Terminators in the Indoor Professional Football League.

Cash had studied Business Management and Sport Management in college and after leaving football he became financial advisor in Platte County, Missouri.
