= 1990 Texas Tech Red Raiders football team =

American college football season

1990 Texas Tech Red Raiders football
- Conference: Southwest Conference
- Record: 4–7 (3–5 SWC)
- Head coach: Spike Dykes (4th season)
- Offensive coordinator: Dick Winder (4th season)
- Offensive scheme: No-huddle spread
- Defensive coordinator: Carlos Mainord (4th season)
- Base defense: 3–4
- Captain: Ronnie Gossett DT
- Home stadium: Jones Stadium

1990 Southwest Conference football standings
	Conf.					Overall
Team	W		L		T	W		L		T
No. 12 Texas $	8	–	0	–	0	10	–	2	–	0
No. 10 Houston	7	–	1	–	0	10	–	1	–	0
No. 15 Texas A&M	5	–	2	–	1	9	–	3	–	1
Baylor	5	–	2	–	1	6	–	4	–	1
Rice	3	–	5	–	0	5	–	6	–	0
TCU	3	–	5	–	0	5	–	6	–	0
Texas Tech	3	–	5	–	0	4	–	7	–	0
Arkansas	1	–	7	–	0	3	–	8	–	0
SMU	0	–	8	–	0	1	–	10	–	0
$ – Conference champion; Rankings from AP Poll

The 1990 Texas Tech Red Raiders football team represented Texas Tech University as a member of the Southwest Conference (SWC) during the 1990 NCAA Division I-A football season. In their fourth season under head coach Spike Dykes, the Red Raiders compiled a 4–7 record (3–5 against SWC opponents), finished in fourth place in the conference, and were outscored by opponents by a combined total of 356 to 322. The team played its home games at Clifford B. and Audrey Jones Stadium in Lubbock, Texas.

== Schedule ==
Date	Time	Opponent	Site	TV	Result	Attendance	Source
September 8	2:30 p.m.	at No. 18 Ohio State*	Ohio Stadium; Columbus, OH	ABC	L 10–17	88,707	
September 13	7:00 p.m.	No. 18 Houston	Jones Stadium; Lubbock, TX (rivalry)	ESPN	L 35–51	36,794	
September 22	6:30 p.m.	at New Mexico*	University Stadium; Albuquerque, NM		W 34–32	15,530	
September 29	7:00 p.m.	Baylor^{†}	Jones Stadium; Lubbock, TX (rivalry)		L 15–21	48,926	
October 6	2:00 p.m.	at No. 19 Texas A&M	Kyle Field; College Station, TX (rivalry)		L 24–28	68,593	
October 13	1:00 p.m.	at Arkansas	Razorback Stadium; Fayetteville, AR (rivalry)		W 49–44	50,114	
October 20	2:00 p.m.	at Rice	Rice Stadium; Houston, TX		L 21–42	15,200	
October 27	12:00 p.m.	No. 8 Miami (FL)*	Jones Stadium; Lubbock, TX	Raycom	L 10–45	50,028	
November 3	12:00 p.m.	No. 14 Texas	Jones Stadium; Lubbock, TX (rivalry)	Raycom	L 22–41	50,276	
November 10	2:00 p.m.	at TCU	Amon G. Carter Stadium; Fort Worth, TX (rivalry)		W 40–28	28,730	
November 17	2:00 p.m.	SMU	Jones Stadium; Lubbock, TX		W 62–7	31,355	
*Non-conference game; ^{†}Homecoming; Rankings from AP Poll released prior to the game; All times are in Central time
