= 1990 Miami Hurricanes football team =

American college football season

1990 Miami Hurricanes football

National champion (ERS, NYT) National co-champion (Billingsley, Sagarin, Rothman) Cotton Bowl Classic champion

Cotton Bowl Classic, W 46–3 vs. Texas
- Conference: Independent

Ranking
- Coaches: No. 3
- AP: No. 3
- Record: 10–2
- Head coach: Dennis Erickson (2nd season)
- Offensive coordinator: Bob Bratkowski (2nd season)
- Offensive scheme: One-back spread
- Defensive coordinator: Sonny Lubick (2nd season)
- Base defense: 4–3
- MVP: Russell Maryland
- Home stadium: Miami Orange Bowl

1990 NCAA Division I-A independents football records
	Conf.			Overall
Team	W	L	T	W		L		T
No. 14 Louisville		–		10	–	1	–	1
No. 3 Miami (FL)		–		10	–	2	–	0
No. 4 Florida State		–		10	–	2	–	0
No. 6 Notre Dame		–		9	–	3	–	0
No. 11 Penn State		–		9	–	3	–	0
Louisiana Tech		–		8	–	3	–	1
Southern Miss		–		8	–	4	–	0
Temple		–		7	–	4	–	0
Syracuse		–		7	–	4	–	2
Army		–		6	–	5	–	0
Northern Illinois		–		6	–	5	–	0
South Carolina		–		6	–	5	–	0
Virginia Tech		–		6	–	5	–	0
East Carolina		–		5	–	6	–	0
Southwestern Louisiana		–		5	–	6	–	0
Navy		–		5	–	6	–	0
Memphis State		–		4	–	6	–	1
Boston College		–		4	–	7	–	0
Tulane		–		4	–	7	–	0
West Virginia		–		4	–	7	–	0
Akron		–		3	–	7	–	1
Pittsburgh		–		3	–	7	–	1
Rutgers		–		3	–	8	–	0
Tulsa		–		3	–	8	–	0
Cincinnati		–		1	–	10	–	0
Rankings from AP Poll

The 1990 Miami Hurricanes football team represented the University of Miami as an independent during the 1990 NCAA Division I-A football season. It was the Hurricanes' 65th season of football. The Hurricanes were led by second-year head coach Dennis Erickson and played their home games at the Orange Bowl. Coming off the school's third national championship in six years in 1989, Miami came in to the 1990 season favored by most experts to repeat as national champions. However, a season opening loss to BYU and a later defeat by Notre Dame dashed those chances and the Canes finished the season 10–2 overall. They were invited to the Cotton Bowl where they defeated Texas, 46–3.

The Hurricanes would be the last No. 1 team to lose on the season opener until the Texas Longhorns in 2025.

== Schedule ==
Date	Time	Opponent	Rank	Site	TV	Result	Attendance	Source
September 8	7:30 pm	at No. 16 BYU	No. 1	Cougar Stadium; Provo, UT	ESPN	L 21–28	66,235	
September 15	3:30 pm	at California	No. 10	California Memorial Stadium; Berkeley, CA	ABC	W 52–24	47,000	
September 29	8:00 pm	Iowa	No. 10	Miami Orange Bowl; Miami, FL	PPV	W 48–21	70,420	
October 6	2:00 pm	No. 2 Florida State	No. 9	Miami Orange Bowl; Miami, FL (rivalry)	CBS	W 31–22	80,396	
October 13	4:00 pm	Kansas	No. 3	Miami Orange Bowl; Miami, FL	Raycom	W 34–0	54,211	
October 20	3:30 pm	at No. 6 Notre Dame	No. 2	Notre Dame Stadium; Notre Dame, IN (rivalry)	CBS	L 20–29	59,075	
October 27	1:00 pm	at Texas Tech	No. 8	Jones Stadium; Lubbock, TX	Raycom	W 45–10	50,028	
November 3	4:00 pm	Pittsburgh^{†}	No. 8	Miami Orange Bowl; Miami, FL		W 45–0	50,412	
November 17	4:00 pm	Boston College	No. 3	Miami Orange Bowl; Miami, FL		W 42–12	50,942	
November 24	7:30 pm	Syracuse	No. 2	Miami Orange Bowl; Miami, FL	ESPN	W 33–7	66,196	
December 1	4:00 pm	at San Diego State	No. 3	Jack Murphy Stadium; San Diego, CA	ESPN	W 30–28	34,201	
January 1	1:30 pm	vs. No. 3 Texas	No. 4	Cotton Bowl; Dallas, TX (Cotton Bowl)	CBS	W 46–3	77,425	
^{†}Homecoming; Rankings from AP Poll released prior to the game; All times are in Eastern time

== Rankings ==
Ranking movements Legend: ██ Increase in ranking ██ Decrease in ranking ( ) = First-place votes
	Week															
Poll	Pre	1	2	3	4	5	6	7	8	9	10	11	12	13	14	Final
AP	1 (24)	1 (27)	10	9	10	9	3 (6)	2 (15)	8	8	5	3	2 (3)	3 (2)	4	3 (1)
Coaches	1 (25)	1	10	8	9	8	4 (4)	2 (7)	9	8	4	3	2 (3)	2 (3)	4 (2)	3 (2)

== Game summaries ==
=== BYU ===
#1 Miami (FL) at #16 BYU

Team	1	2	3	4	Total
Hurricanes	7	7	7	0	21
• Cougars	0	17	11	0	28

- Date: September 8
- Location: Cougar Stadium, Provo, UT
- Game attendance: 66,235
- TV announcers (ESPN): Ron Franklin and Gary Danielson

Scoring summary
Q1	MIA	McGuire 7-yard run (Huerta kick)	MIA 7–0
Q2	BYU	Bellini 14-yard pass from Detmer (Kaufman kick)	Tied 7–7
Q2	BYU	Kaufman 32-yard field goal	BYU 10–7
Q2	MIA	McGuire 7-yard run (Huerta kick)	MIA 14–10
Q2	BYU	Boyce 2-yard pass from Detmer (Kaufman kick)	BYU 17–14
Q3	MIA	Conley 5-yard run (Huerta kick)	MIA 21–17
Q3	BYU	Kaufman 29-yard field goal	MIA 21–20
Q3	BYU	Salido 7-yard pass from Detmer (Detmer to Boyce pass)	BYU 28–21

=== California ===
#10 Miami (FL) at California

Team	1	2	3	4	Total
• Hurricanes	10	21	0	21	52
Golden Bears	14	7	0	3	24

- Date: September 15
- Location: California Memorial Stadium, Berkeley, CA
- Game attendance: 47,000
- Referee: Gordon Reese
- TV announcers (ABC): Gary Bender and Lynn Swann

Scoring summary
Q1	MIA	Huerta 22 yard field goal	MIA 3–0
Q1	CAL	White 99 yard kickoff return (Keen kick)	CAL 7–3
Q1	MIA	Carroll 20 yard pass from Erickson (Huerta kick)	MIA 10–7
Q1	CAL	White 1 yard run (Keen kick)	CAL 14–10
Q2	MIA	Bethel 7 yard pass from Erickson (Huerta kick)	MIA 17–14
Q2	CAL	Treggs 13 yard pass from Pawlawski (Keen kick)	CAL 21–17
Q2	MIA	Erickson 1 yard run (Huerta kick)	MIA 24–21
Q2	MIA	Hill 4 yard pass from Erickson (Huerta kick)	MIA 31–21
Q4	CAL	Keen 25 yard field goal	MIA 31–24
Q4	MIA	McGuire 1 yard run (Huerta kick)	MIA 38–24
Q4	MIA	Conley 7 yard pass from Erickson (Huerta kick)	MIA 45–24
Q4	MIA	Spencer 38 yard run (Huerta kick)	MIA 52–24

=== Iowa ===
Iowa at #10 Miami

Team	1	2	3	4	Total
Hawkeyes	0	14	7	0	21
• Hurricanes	14	10	7	17	48

- Date: September 29
- Location: Orange Bowl
  Miami, FL
- Game attendance: 70,420

Scoring summary
1	4:14	UM	McGuire 1-yard run (Huerta kick)	MIA 7–0
1		UM	Wesley Carroll 73-yard pass from Craig Erickson (Huerta kick)	MIA 14–0
2	13:42	IOWA	Nick Bell 3-yard run (Skillett kick)	MIA 14–7
2		UM	Darryl Spencer 40-yard pass from Craig Erickson (Huerta kick)	MIA 21–7
2		IOWA	Nick Bell 53-yard pass from Matt Rodgers (Skillett kick)	MIA 21–14
2		UM	Huerta field goal	MIA 24–14
3	8:29	IOWA	Sean Smith 35-yard pass from Matt Rodgers (Skillett kick)	MIA 24–21
3		UM	McGuire 6-yard run (Huerta kick)	MIA 31–21
4	14:04	UM	Wesley Carroll 16-yard pass from Craig Erickson (Huerta kick)	MIA 38–21
4		UM	Huerta 36-yard field goal	MIA 41–21
4		UM	Ryan McNeil 75-yard fumble return (Huerta kick)	MIA 48–21

=== Florida State ===
#2 Florida State at #9 Miami (FL)

Team	1	2	3	4	Total
Seminoles	0	6	3	13	22
• Hurricanes	10	14	0	7	31

- Date: October 6
- Location: Orange Bowl, Miami, FL
- Game attendance: 80,396
- TV announcers (CBS): Jim Nantz, Tim Brant, and John Dockery

=== Notre Dame ===
#2 Miami (FL) at #6 Notre Dame

Team	1	2	3	4	Total
Hurricanes	10	7	0	3	20
• Fighting Irish	10	6	6	7	29

- Date: October 20
- Location: Notre Dame Stadium, South Bend, IN
- Game attendance: 59,075
- TV announcers (CBS): Jim Nantz and Tim Brant

Scoring summary
Q1	12:17	MIA	McGuire 1-yard run (Huerta kick)	MIA 7–0
Q1	6:51	ND	Hentrich-25 yard field goal	MIA 7–3
Q1	1:43	MIA	Huerta 23-yard field goal	MIA 10–3
Q1		ND	Ismail 94-yard kickoff return (Hentrich kick)	Tie 10–10
Q2	11:48	ND	Hentrich-44 yard field goal	ND 13–10
Q2	8:10	MIA	Erickson-1 yard run (Huerta kick)	MIA 17–13
Q2	4:16	ND	Hentrich-34 yard field goal	MIA 17–16
Q3	5:24	ND	Hentrich-36 yard field goal	ND 19–17
Q3	1:45	ND	Hentrich 35-yard field goal	ND 22–17
Q4	14:01	MIA	Huerta 25-yard field goal	ND 22–20
Q4	6:16	ND	Culver 21-yard pass from Mirer (Hentrich kick)	ND 29–20

=== San Diego State ===
Miami (FL) Hurricanes at San Diego State Aztecs

Quarter	1	2	3	4	Total
Miami (FL)	7	13	10	0	30
San Diego St	0	13	7	8	28

at Jack Murphy Stadium, San Diego, California

- Date: December 1, 1990
- Game attendance: 34,201

Game information
- MIA – Carroll 55-yard pass from Erickson (Huerta kick)
- SDS – Trakas 25-yard field goal
- SDS – R. Rowe 3-yard pass from McGwire (Trakas kick)
- MIA – Huerta 44-yard field goal
- MIA – McGuire 5-yard run (Huerta kick)
- SDS – Trakas 43-yard field goal
- MIA – Huerta 29-yard field goal
- SDS – Wright 9-yard run (Trakas kick)
- MIA – Hill 11-yard pass from Erickson (Huerta kick)
- MIA – Huerta 22-yard field goal
- SDS – Arey 13-yard pass from McGwire (pass good)

Top passers

- MIA – Erickson 17/39, 264 Yds, 2 TD, INT
- SDS – McGwire 32/53, 323 Yds, 2 TD, INT

Top rushers

- MIA – McGuire 19/30, TD
- SDS – Wright 22/112, TD

Top receivers

- MIA – Hill 6/112, TD
- SDS – R. Rowe 9/102, TD

=== Cotton Bowl ===
Cotton Bowl Classic: #4 Miami (FL) Hurricanes vs. #3 Texas Longhorns

Quarter	1	2	3	4	Total
Miami (FL)	12	7	14	13	46
Texas	0	3	0	0	3

at Cotton Bowl • Dallas, Texas

- Date: January 1, 1991
- Game attendance: 73,521
- Referee: Jimmy Harper
- TV announcers (CBS): Jim Nantz, Tim Brant, and John Dockery

Game information

Miami (FL)

- Craig Erickson
  17/26, 272 Yds, 4 TD

Texas

Scoring summary

Quarter	Time	Drive			Team	Scoring information	Score	
Quarter	Time	Plays	Yards	TOP	Team	Scoring information	MIA	TEX
1	8:53				Miami (FL)	28-yard field goal by Huerta	3	0
1	5:26				Miami (FL)	50-yard field goal by Huerta	6	0
1	0:11				Miami (FL)	Carroll 12-yard touchdown reception from Erickson, 2-point pass failed	12	0
2	7:43				Texas	29-yard field goal by Pollak	12	3
2	4:17				Miami (FL)	Carroll 24-yard touchdown reception from Erickson, Huerta kick good	19	3
3	11:46				Miami (FL)	Interception returned 34 yards for touchdown by D. Smith, Huerta kick good	26	3
3	6:09				Miami (FL)	Hill 48-yard touchdown reception from Erickson, Huerta kick good	33	3
4	10:56				Miami (FL)	Bethel 4-yard touchdown reception from Erickson, Huerta kick no good (blocked)	39	3
4	9:23				Miami (FL)	Conley 26-yard touchdown run, Huerta kick good	46	3
"TOP" = time of possession. For other American football terms, see Glossary of American football.							46	3

== Roster ==
1990 Miami Hurricanes football team roster
Players
Coaches
Offense

Pos.	#	Name	Class
OL	60	Rudy Barber	Fr
TE	17	Coleman Bell	So
TE	93	Randy Bethel	Sr
WR	12	Bobby Byrd	Sr
WR	81	Wesley Carroll	Sr
TE	84	Rob Chudzinski	Sr
RB	28	Leonard Conley	Sr
WR	88	Horace Copeland	So
OL	72	Mario Cristobal	So
FB	20	Shannon Crowell	Sr
QB	7	Craig Erickson	Sr
TE	82	Carlos Etheredge	Fr
OL	66	Darren Handy	Sr
OL	98	Kelvin Harris	Jr
WR	3	Randal Hill	Sr
RB	21	Alex Johnson	Sr
OL	70	Claude Jones	Jr
RB	32	Jason Marucci	So
RB	30	Stephen McGuire	So
TE	90	Joe Moore	Jr
RB	22	Martin Patton	So
OL	73	Leon Searcy	Jr
WR	35	Darryl Spencer	Jr
G	79	Mike Sullivan	Sr
WR	36	Lamar Thomas	So
QB	13	Gino Torretta	So
WR	5	Kevin Williams	Fr

Defense

Pos.	#	Name	Class
LB	1	Jessie Armstead	So
CB	23	Robert Bailey	Sr
LB	56	Micheal Barrow	So
S	8	Hurlie Brown	Jr
DL	76	Mark Caesar	So
LB	49	Maurice Crum	Sr
DE	44	Shane Curry	Sr
OL	97	Anthony Hamlet	Jr
DB	26	Herbert James	Jr
DL	94	Dwayne Johnson	Fr
DL	71	Kenny Lopez	Fr
DT	67	Russell Maryland	Sr
DB	47	Ryan McNeil	Fr
DL	98	Rusty Medearis	Fr
DL	95	Eric Miller	Jr
DL	86	Kevin Patrick	Fr
DB	2	Charles Pharms	Jr
LB	45	Darrin Smith	So
DB	16	Roland Smith	Sr
DB	31	Darryl Williams	So

Special teams

Pos.	#	Name	Class
K	27	Carlos Huerta	Jr
P	15	Paul Snyder	So

Head coach

- Dennis Erickson

Coordinators/assistant coaches

- Dave Arnold (ST/TE)
- Bob Bratkowski (OC/WR)
- Bob Karmelowicz (DL)
- Art Kehoe (Ast OL)
- Sonny Lubick (DC/DB)
- Ed Orgeron (DL)
- Brad Roll (Str + Cond)
- Gregg Smith (OL)
- Tommy Tuberville (LB)
- Alex Wood (RB)

Legend

- (C) Team captain
- (S) Suspended
- (I) Ineligible
- Injured
- Redshirt

Roster

== Awards and honors ==
- Craig Erickson, Johnny Unitas Golden Arm Award
- Russell Maryland, Outland Trophy

=== Jack Harding University of Miami MVP Award ===
- Russell Maryland, DT

== 1991 NFL draft ==
Player	Position	Round	Pick	Team
Russell Maryland	Defensive tackle	1	1	Dallas Cowboys
Randal Hill	Wide receiver	1	23	Miami Dolphins
Shane Curry	Defensive end	2	40	Indianapolis Colts
Wesley Carroll	Wide receiver	2	42	New Orleans Saints
Robert Bailey	Defensive back	4	107	Los Angeles Rams
Craig Erickson	Quarterback	5	131	Philadelphia Eagles
Mike Sullivan	Guard	6	153	Dallas Cowboys
Roland Smith	Defensive back	8	220	Miami Dolphins
Randy Bethel	Tight end	10	251	New England Patriots
