= R. C. Slocum =

American football player and coach (born 1944)

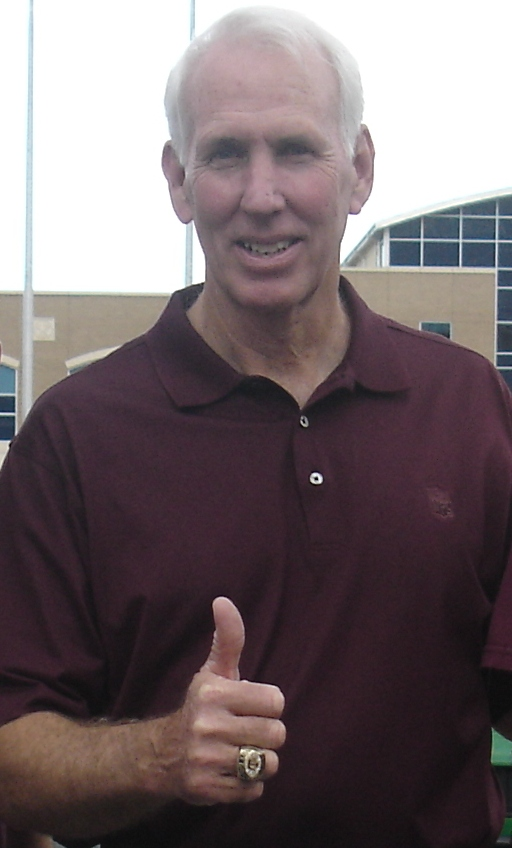
- Slocum gives a gig 'em with his Big 12 Championship ring

Biographical details
- Born: November 7, 1944 (age 81); Oakdale, Louisiana, U.S.

Playing career
- 1965–1967: McNeese State
- Position: Tight end

Coaching career (HC unless noted)
- 1968–1969: Lake Charles HS (LA) (DC)
- 1970: Kansas State (freshmen OL)
- 1971: Kansas State (freshmen)
- 1972: Texas A&M (offensive asst.)
- 1973–1978: Texas A&M (defensive asst.)
- 1979–1980: Texas A&M (DC)
- 1981: USC (DC)
- 1982–1988: Texas A&M (DC)
- 1989–2002: Texas A&M

Administrative career (AD unless noted)
- 2019: Texas A&M (interim AD)
- 2024: Texas A&M (interim AD)

Head coaching record
- Overall: 123–47–2
- Bowls: 3–8

Accomplishments and honors

Championships
- 3 SWC (1991–1993); Big 12 (1998); 2 Big 12 South Division (1997–1998)

Awards
- 3× SWC Coach of the Year (1991, 1992, 1993); Amos Alonzo Stagg Award (2014); Texas Sports Hall of Fame (2005)
- College Football Hall of Fame; Inducted in 2012 (profile)

Richard Copeland Slocum (born November 7, 1944) is an American former football player and coach who is currently a special assistant to the president at Texas A&M University. He has also served as interim athletic director at the university from January through June 2019 and again from January through March 2024, and previously served as the head football coach there from 1989 to 2002. He has won more games as coach (123) than anyone else in Texas A&M Aggies football history. Slocum was inducted into the College Football Hall of Fame as a coach in 2012.

== Personal life ==
Raised in Orange, Texas, Slocum graduated from Stark High School in Orange in 1963 and attended McNeese State University in Lake Charles, Louisiana. Slocum earned a B.S. in physical education in 1967 and M.S. in educational administration in 1968, both from McNeese State. He has two sons; the older, Shawn Slocum, was an assistant coach at Texas A&M under his father and has been the special teams coordinator for the Arizona State Sun Devils since 2015.

== Coaching career ==
=== Early career ===
Slocum began his career as a football coach at Lake Charles High School in 1968. Two years later, in 1970, Slocum became a graduate assistant at Kansas State University under head coach Vince Gibson, also coaching the offensive linemen on the freshman team. In 1971, he was named head freshman coach.

=== USC ===
Slocum spent the 1981 season as the defensive coordinator at the University of Southern California (USC) under John Robinson. Slocum's defense led the Pacific-10 Conference in total defense that season. The team lost to Penn State in the 1982 Fiesta Bowl, finishing with a 9–3 record.

=== Texas A&M ===
In 1972, Slocum was hired as receivers coach under Emory Bellard at Texas A&M University. After one year of coaching the receivers, he was moved to defense to coach the defensive ends, and in 1976, he became linebackers coach. Bellard left A&M in 1978, moving on to Mississippi State and taking defensive coordinator Melvin Robertson with him. Former A&M offensive coordinator and new head coach Tom Wilson chose Slocum as his defensive coordinator in 1979. After serving USC as defensive coordinator in 1981, Slocum returned to A&M in 1982 as defensive coordinator under Jackie Sherrill. In 1985, Slocum was elevated to assistant head coach. Slocum substituted for Sherrill and served as acting head coach for A&M's 18–0 victory over TCU during the 1988 season, which was Sherrill's last.

==== Head coach ====
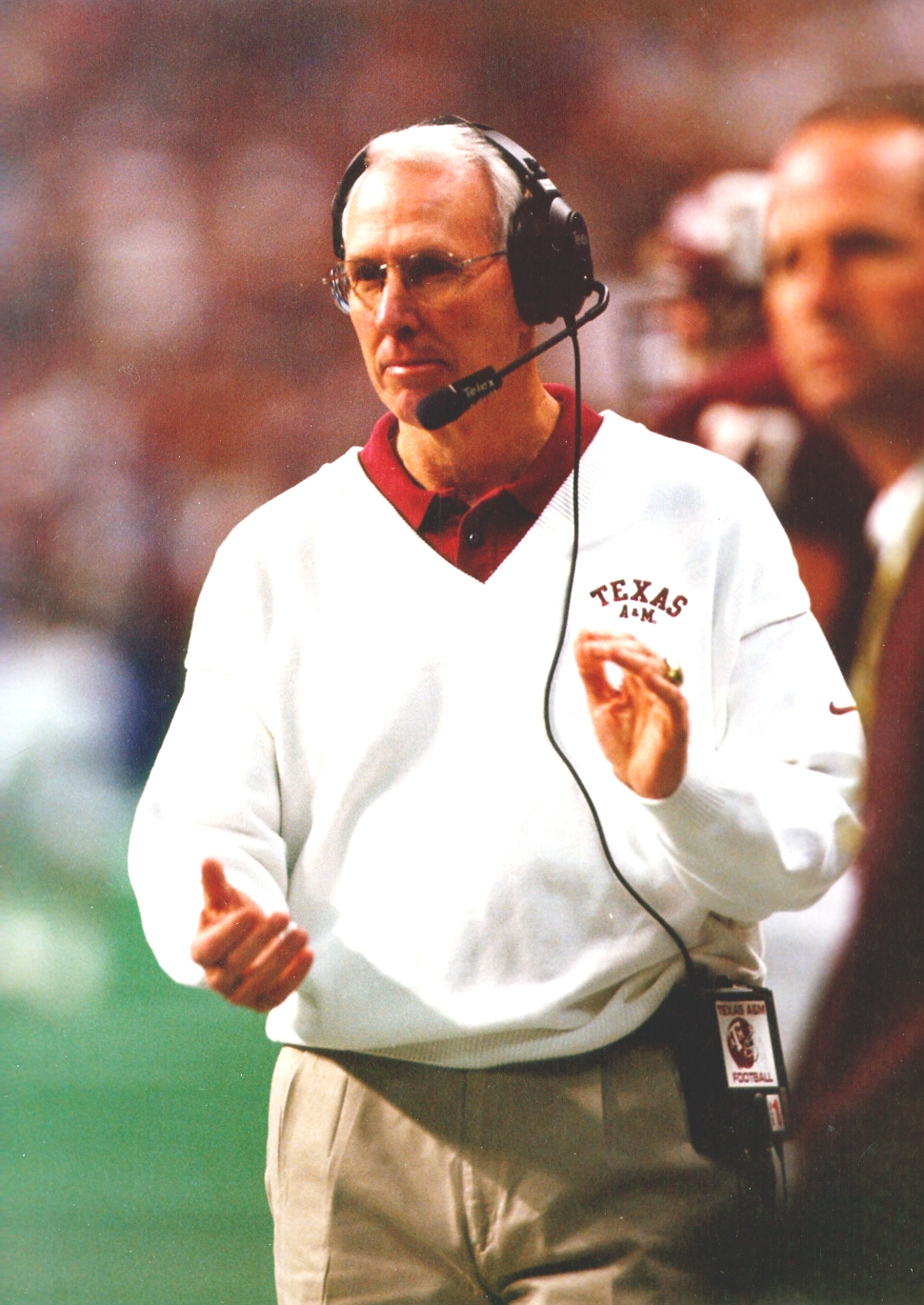
Slocum as head coach of the Texas A&M Aggies

In December 1988, Sherrill was forced to resign, and Slocum was named his successor. During his 14 years as head coach, Slocum led the Aggies to a record of 123–47–2, making him the winningest coach in Texas A&M history. During his career, Slocum never had a losing season and won four conference championships, including the Big 12 title in 1998 and two Big 12 South Championships in 1997 and 1998. Additionally, he led the Aggies to become the first school in Southwest Conference history to post three consecutive perfect conference seasons and actually went four consecutive seasons without a conference loss. Slocum reached 100 wins faster than any other active coach. He has the best winning percentage in SWC history, one spot ahead of the legendary coach Darrell Royal who is number two.

Under his tenure, Slocum helped make A&M's Kyle Field one of the hardest places to play in the nation, only losing 12 home games in 14 years, going parts of seven seasons without a home loss. After a home loss to Arkansas on November 24, 1989 (which broke a streak of 19 consecutive SWC home victories), they did not lose again in College Station until December 2, 1995, when his Aggies lost to Texas 16–6, although they did tie Baylor (20–20) on October 20, 1990. With Miami's 58-game, nine-season home winning streak ending in 1994, A&M owned the longest active home winning streak in the nation for much of 1994 and 1995. In the 1990s, A&M lost only four times at Kyle Field. Slocum was named SWC Coach of the Year three times during his tenure as head coach. His "Wrecking Crew" defense led the SWC in four statistical categories from 1991 through 1993 and led the nation in total defense in 1991.

Over 50 Texas A&M players were drafted into the NFL during Slocum's career as head coach.

Slocum inherited an Aggie football program that had just finished 7-5 and had been slapped with severe NCAA sanctions for violations under Sherrill. He did not take long to clean up the program. He was quoted in 2002 as saying:

I wouldn't trade winning another game or two for my reputation as a person. I've said from day one I'm going to do things the way I think they should be done. There were those who said, 'If you don't cheat, you're pretty naive. You can't win that way.' Well, we're going to find out. That's the way we're going to do it. I can walk away and look myself in the mirror and say, 'We did it the right way.'

After 14 years as head coach, Slocum was forced to resign in 2002 following only the second non-winning season of his career, and his only losing record in conference play. He immediately assumed a position as special adviser to Texas A&M president Robert Gates.

In May 2012, Slocum was inducted into the College Football Hall of Fame.

On April 19, 2019, Slocum was named interim athletic director for Texas A&M after the sudden departure of Scott Woodward to LSU. Following Ross Bjork's departure for the athletic director role at Ohio State in January 2024, Slocum again served as interim AD before the hiring of Trev Alberts.

== Head coaching record ==
Year	Team	Overall	Conference	Standing	Bowl/playoffs	Coaches^{#}	AP^{°}
Texas A&M Aggies (Southwest Conference) (1989–1995)
1989	Texas A&M	8–4	6–2	T–2nd	L John Hancock		20
1990	Texas A&M	9–3–1	5–2–1	T–3rd	W Holiday	13	15
1991	Texas A&M	10–2	8–0	1st	L Cotton	13	12
1992	Texas A&M	12–1	7–0	1st	L Cotton^{†}	6	7
1993	Texas A&M	10–2	7–0	1st	L Cotton^{†}	8	9
1994	Texas A&M	10–0–1	6–0–1	*	*		8
1995	Texas A&M	9–3	5–2	T–2nd	W Alamo	15	15
Texas A&M Aggies (Big 12 Conference) (1996–2002)
1996	Texas A&M	6–6	4–4	3rd (South)			
1997	Texas A&M	9–4	6–2	1st (South)	L Cotton	21	20
1998	Texas A&M	11–3	7–1	1st (South)	L Sugar^{†}	13	11
1999	Texas A&M	8–4	5–3	T–2nd (South)	L Alamo	20	23
2000	Texas A&M	7–5	5–3	3rd (South)	L Independence		
2001	Texas A&M	8–4	4–4	T–3rd (South)	W Galleryfurniture.com		
2002	Texas A&M	6–6	3–5	5th (South)			
Texas A&M:		123–47–2	78–28–2				
Total:		123–47–2					
National championship Conference title Conference division title or championship game berth
^{†}Indicates Bowl Coalition, Bowl Alliance or BCS bowl.; ^{#}Rankings from final Coaches Poll.; ^{°}Rankings from final AP Poll.; * A&M was ineligible.

== See also ==
- Legends Poll
