= Legends Poll =

The Legends Poll was a poll that rated the Top 25 teams weekly during the college football season. Its aim was to identify the two best teams in its opinion by the end of the season who should compete in a national championship game. The voters were a group of retired coaches, most of whom were in the College Football Hall of Fame. The Legends Poll was founded by Andy Curtin in 2005 as the Master Coaches Survey, but changed its name in 2008 to better reflect the make-up of its voting members. Curtin and his partner, Pete Wolek implemented the original plan and operated the Legends Poll since its inception. The Legends Poll was published by ESPN and the Sporting News.

== History ==
In July 2005, Curtin, Wolek and three partners invited a selection of retired college football coaches to a three-day conference in Thomasville, Georgia to introduce the concept of the Legends Poll. The original 16 members were John Cooper, Vince Dooley, Pat Dye, LaVell Edwards, Hayden Fry, Don James, Frank Kush, Dick MacPherson, Bill Mallory, Don Nehlen, John Ralston, John Robinson, Bo Schembechler, R. C. Slocum, Gene Stallings and George Welsh.

This polling system was created to address the issues found in the three dominant polls of the time: AP Poll, Coaches Poll, Bowl Championship Series (BCS)

The AP poll was made up of 65 sports journalists. The two major criticisms this poll has faced are that these journalists don't have the football knowledge of head coaches and that they suffer from regional bias. Legends Poll coaches had, on average, over 23 years of head coaching experience. These coaches were also able to watch full games out of their time zone before voting.

The Coaches poll consisted of current head coaches from the 116 programs across the country. These voters had the expertise to judge the Top 25 teams but lacked the time necessary to evaluate them. During the season, coaches are busy with their own teams, watching film of their upcoming opponent. Legends Poll coaches were retired and watched multiple games on Saturdays, as well as being provided with game film from other action across the country.

The BCS rankings combined the AP poll, Coaches poll and numerous computer rankings. The Bowl Championship Series controversies mounted over the years, with many published rankings going against common expectation by the sporting community. Legends Poll voters would discuss the recent games on an hour-long conference call each week to smooth over outliers of player injuries, garbage time points, and to explain their reasoning for that week's eye test (a term for subjective rating based on the person's background knowledge).

The final AP and Coaches polls also were heavily influenced by preseason rankings. Teams ranked highly before the season would stay ahead of lower-ranked teams if both kept winning. One such incident in 2004 directly led to the formation of the Legends Poll. Undefeated Auburn had five wins over top 10 teams, but only finished #3 in the BCS because of their low starting position in the preseason. The Legends Poll would not have a pre-season poll. The first poll wouldn't take place until after the voters had seen three weeks’ worth of games.

== Polling Methodology ==
Coaches assigned to specific teams to focus on. wide geographic diversity. 15 coaches helps to smooth out any potential bias. Games were recorded. DVDs sent to coaches. Reviewing at least 15 games a week via film study. The weekly conference call allowed the coaches to point out to each other the strengths and weaknesses of the various teams. During the conference call each coach would present his synopsis on his assigned teams, and the other coaches would comment on or question what had been presented. This system thus allowed all of its voters the shared expertise of the entire group. As the season progressed and more teams dropped from contention for the top spots in the poll, coaches who lost teams from that process would be assigned new teams to follow, which allowed the Legends Poll to have multiple experts looking at the top teams as the season wound down. Independent voting by the coaches. Would send in their top 25 and all votes would be averaged out to form the weekly Legends Poll. The ultimate goal of the Legends Poll was not to get the 25 teams in exactly correct numerical order each week, but to produce the correct two teams listed as #1 & #2 at the conclusion of the season, after watching the entire body of work of all the contending teams throughout that season.

== Members ==
Legends Poll members	School(s)	Record	National Championships
Bobby Bowden	Florida State, West Virginia, Howard	375–129–4 (44 seasons)	1993, 1999
Frank Broyles	Arkansas, Missouri	149–62–6 (20 seasons)	1964
John Cooper	Ohio State, Arizona State, Tulsa	192–84–6 (24 seasons)	
Fisher DeBerry	Air Force	169–107–1 (23 seasons)	
Terry Donahue	UCLA	151–74–8 (20 seasons)	
Vince Dooley	Georgia	201–77–10 (25 seasons)	1980
Pat Dye	Auburn, Wyoming, E. Carolina	153–62–5 (19 seasons)	1983
LaVell Edwards	BYU	257–101–3 (29 seasons)	1984
Hayden Fry	Iowa, North Texas, SMU	232–178–10 (37 seasons)	
Don James	Washington, Kent State	178–76–3 (22 seasons)	1991
Frank Kush	Arizona State	176–54–1 (22 seasons)	
Dick MacPherson	Syracuse	111–73–5 (17 seasons)	
Bill Mallory	Indiana, Colorado, Miami (OH), N. Illinois	165–121–4 (27 seasons)	
Don Nehlen	West Virginia, Bowling Green	202–128–8 (30 seasons)	
Tom Osborne	Nebraska	255–49–3 (25 seasons)	1994, 1995, 1997
John Ralston	Stanford, Utah State, San Jose State	97–81–4 (17 seasons)	
John Robinson	USC, UNLV	132–77–4 (18 seasons)	1978
Bobby Ross	Georgia Tech, Maryland, Army, The Citadel	103–101–2 (18 seasons)	1990
Bo Schembechler	Michigan, Miami (OH)	234–65–8 (26 seasons)	
R. C. Slocum	Texas A&M	123–47–2 (14 seasons)	
Bill Snyder	Kansas State	136–68–1 (17 seasons)	
Gene Stallings	Alabama, Texas A&M	89–70–1 (14 seasons)	1992
George Welsh	Virginia, Navy	189–132–4 (28 seasons)	

== Membership Changes ==
2006 added: Terry Donahue, an original invitee, had prior commitments in 2005. 2006 removed: Bo Schembechler, died in November. 2007 added: Tom Osborne 2007 removed: Osborne, after staying the full season, he left the poll to become the Nebraska Athletics Director. 2008 added: Bill Snyder, Frank Broyles and Fisher DeBerry. 2008 removed: Hayden Fry, for health concerns. Snyder left after one season to return to coaching Kansas State. 2010 added: Bobby Ross, and Bobby Bowden. Bowden joined mere months after coaching his final game at Florida State. 2013 added: Tom Osborne for a second time after retiring as Athletics Director at Nebraska. 2014 removed: Osbourne again. He was invited to be on the CFP selection committee. They requested him not continue to vote in the Legends Poll.

== College Football Playoff Consideration ==
At the college football Hall of Fame dinner in New York City, December 2015 Jack Ford, Vice-chairman of the National Football Foundation remarked that the Legends Poll was the blueprint for the College Football Playoff (CFP) selection committee. A number of national football writers also pushed to have the Legends Poll members become the CFP Selection Committee. There was discussion about the Legends Poll forming part of the College Football Playoff selection committee as they transitioned away from the BCS, but that did not happen and the poll became dormant.

In 2013, Bill Hancock, the executive director of the CFP, was to put together a selection committee that would replace the BCS as the method for determining the NCAA FBS college football champion. Hancock was searching for up to 20 members with high integrity who could make difficult decisions. But many experts suggested he focus on people who held a deeper understanding of college football such as successful retired coaches.

The Legends Poll offered experienced coaches with Hall of Fame credentials representing all Power Five conferences along with independents and programs from the Group of Five conferences. The poll released their individual weekly votes to the public, and the coaches had decades of experience standing up to highly critical fan bases with high expectations. Nebraska Athletics Director and former Legends Poll voter, Tom Osborne, recommended the Legends Poll to CFP executive director Bill Hancock "that they take a look at the coaches serving” to populate the CFP selection committee.

In October 2013, the CFB playoff committee was announced with only three coaches included in the group of 13 with the remaining voting members being athletics directors and recognizable or celebrity non-football persons. The CFP selection committee met in person while the Legends Poll held conference calls. The CFP ended up adopting similar systems the Legends Poll had been using for almost a decade but without their expertise and without assigned teams to cover from across the country. Only two Legends Poll coaches have ever served on the selection committee, Tom Osborne and R.C. Slocum.

The overwhelming majority of the criticism that followed the CFP selection committee announcement was directed towards the lack of football experience from many committee members. CFP votes would not be public. This irritated fans looking for a clearer system with more transparency than the BCS. Certain selection committee members would be forced to recuse themselves from voting on certain schools they had coached at but not others. This recusal system came under fire from many as being too arbitrary. An overall lack of expert analysis, and not openly sharing their individual votes with the public soured the public's excitement about the much anticipated CFP upgrade from the BCS.

The Legends Poll continued until January 2015 when it became clear the poll would not be officially adopted by the CFP. Many of the Legends Poll coaches had declined in health between 2005 and 2014 with Schembechler and James both dying as active members. 11 more Legends Poll coaches have died since 2015.

The Legends Poll set out to fix the old polls and ended up giving the CFP an example of how a committee model with weekly discussions could be used to select postseason playoff teams.

== See also ==
- AP poll
- Coaches Poll
- Harris Poll
- Bowl Championship Series
- Mythical National Championship
- College football national championships in NCAA Division I FBS
- College Football Playoff
- College Football Playoff selection committee
