= 1990 Holiday Bowl =

1990 SeaWorld Holiday Bowl
Texas A&M Aggies	BYU Cougars
(8-3-1)	(10–2)
SWC	WAC
65	14
Head coach: R. C. Slocum	Head coach: LaVell Edwards
AP / Coaches; NR / 19	AP / Coaches; 13 / 9
	1	2	3	4	Total
Texas A&M	14	23	7	21	65
BYU	7	0	7	0	14
- Date: December 29, 1990
- Season: 1990
- Stadium: Jack Murphy Stadium
- Location: San Diego
- MVP: Offensive: Bucky Richardson; Defensive: William Thomas
- Referee: James Sprenger (Pac-10)
- Attendance: 61,441
- Payout: US$1,200,728 per team

United States TV coverage
- Network: ESPN
- Announcers: Sean McDonough, Mike Gottfried, and Neil Lomax

The 1990 SeaWorld Holiday Bowl was a post-season college football bowl game between the Texas A&M Aggies and BYU Cougars on December 29, 1990, at Jack Murphy Stadium, now known as Qualcomm Stadium, in San Diego, California. The game was part of the 1990 NCAA Division I-A football season and was the final game of the season for both teams. Texas A&M defeated BYU 65–14.

The game featured BYU's Heisman Trophy winner Ty Detmer, and marked the last time for more than 20 years that the season's Heisman winner would appear in a bowl before New Year's Day. This would not happen again until the 2011 Alamo Bowl, featuring Baylor's Robert Griffin III.

== Game summary ==
- Texas A&M - R. Wilson 1 yard touchdown yard run (Talbot kick)
- BYU - C. Smith 8 yard touchdown yard pass from Detmer (Kauffman kick)
- Texas A&M - D. Lewis 6 yard touchdown yard run (Talbot kick)
- Texas A&M - Richardson 6 yard touchdown yard run (Talbot kick)
- Texas A&M - Safety
- Texas A&M - Richardson 22 yard touchdown pass from D. Lewis (Talbot kick)
- Texas A&M - Garrett 6 yard touchdown pass from Richardson (Talbot kick)
- BYU - Clark 1 yard touchdown pass from Evans (Kauffman kick)
- Texas A&M - Richardson 27 yard touchdown yard run (Talbot kick)
- Texas A&M - D. Lewis 3 yard touchdown yard run (Talbot kick)
- Texas A&M - Paterson 14 yard touchdown yard pass from Pavlas (Talbot kick)
- Texas A&M - Krahl 9 yard touchdown yard pass from Pavlas (Talbot kick)

Texas A&M dominated the Cougars, rushing for 356 yards (while BYU had -12), passing for 324 (while BYU had 197), and forcing four turnovers (with the Aggies only having one), while only punting once and having the ball 38:28 of the game, with 72 return yards. BYU had 207 return yards (in part due to having 10 kickoffs and one punt to return), with a paltry 21:31 possession time. Ty Detemer went 11-of-23 for 120 yards and one touchdown and interception while being sacked twice. He was later replaced by Joe Evans, who went 4-of-9 for 77 yards with one touchdown, while being sacked thrice. Bucky Richardson threw 9-of-11 for 203 yards with one touchdown, while also rushing for 129 yards on 12 carries and 2 touchdowns, along a catch for 22 yards that also was for a touchdown. His four touchdown performance gained him MVP honors. William Thomas had 6 tackles, 2 of them going for sacks while being named defensive MVP.
