= 1990 Arkansas Razorbacks football team =

American college football season

1990 Arkansas Razorbacks football
- Conference: Southwest Conference
- Record: 3–8 (1–7 SWC)
- Head coach: Jack Crowe (1st season)
- Offensive coordinator: Joe Pate (1st season)
- Captains: Quinn Grovey; Chad Rolen
- Home stadium: Razorback Stadium; War Memorial Stadium

1990 Southwest Conference football standings
	Conf.					Overall
Team	W		L		T	W		L		T
No. 12 Texas $	8	–	0	–	0	10	–	2	–	0
No. 10 Houston	7	–	1	–	0	10	–	1	–	0
No. 15 Texas A&M	5	–	2	–	1	9	–	3	–	1
Baylor	5	–	2	–	1	6	–	4	–	1
Rice	3	–	5	–	0	5	–	6	–	0
TCU	3	–	5	–	0	5	–	6	–	0
Texas Tech	3	–	5	–	0	4	–	7	–	0
Arkansas	1	–	7	–	0	3	–	8	–	0
SMU	0	–	8	–	0	1	–	10	–	0
$ – Conference champion; Rankings from AP Poll

The 1990 Arkansas Razorbacks football team represented the University of Arkansas as a member of the Southwest Conference (SWC) during the 1990 NCAA Division I-A football season. Led by first-year head coach Jack Crowe, the Razorbacks compiled an overall record of 3–8 with a mark of 1–7 in conference play, placing eighth in the SWC. Arkansas failed to reach a bowl game for the first time since the 1983 season and finished with a losing record for the first time since the 1967 season. The team played home games at Razorback Stadium in Fayetteville, Arkansas and War Memorial Stadium in Little Rock, Arkansas.

== Schedule ==
Date	Time	Opponent	Rank	Site	TV	Result	Attendance	Source
September 15	4:00 p.m.	Tulsa*	No. 15	Razorback Stadium; Fayetteville, AR		W 28–3	50,118	
September 22	12:00 p.m.	Ole Miss*	No. 13	War Memorial Stadium; Little Rock, AR (rivalry)	Raycom	L 17–21	54,890	
September 29	7:00 p.m.	Colorado State*	No. 23	War Memorial Stadium; Little Rock, AR		W 31–20	50,480	
October 6	7:00 p.m.	TCU	No. 21	War Memorial Stadium; Little Rock, AR		L 26–54	51,612	
October 13	4:00 p.m.	Texas Tech		Razorback Stadium; Fayetteville, AR (rivalry)		L 44–49	50,114	
October 20	12:00 p.m.	at No. 19 Texas		Texas Memorial Stadium; Austin, TX (rivalry)	Raycom	L 17–49	72,657	
October 27	12:00 p.m.	at No. 6 Houston		Houston Astrodome; Houston, TX	HSE	L 28–62	27,352	
November 3	7:00 p.m.	Rice		War Memorial Stadium; Little Rock, AR		L 11–19	42,860	
November 10	12:00 p.m.	at Baylor		Floyd Casey Stadium; Waco, TX	Raycom	L 3–34	40,234	
November 17	3:00 p.m.	Texas A&M		Razorback Stadium; Fayetteville, AR (rivalry)		L 16–20	46,418	
November 24	1:00 p.m.	at SMU		Ownby Stadium; University Park, TX		W 42–29	17,100	
*Non-conference game; Rankings from AP Poll released prior to the game; All times are in Central time

== Game summaries ==
=== Tulsa ===
Team	1	2	3	4	Total
Tulsa	0	0	3	0	3
• Arkansas	14	7	7	0	28

- Date: September 15
- Location: Razorback Stadium

Scoring summary
Q1	ARK	Caldwell 48 yard pass from Grovey (Wright kick)	ARK 7–0
Q1	ARK	Russell 57 yard pass from Grovey (Wright kick)	ARK 14–0
Q2	ARK	A. Jackson 1 yard run (Wright kick)	ARK 21–0
Q3	TUL	Seals 18 yard field goal	ARK 21–3
Q3	ARK	A. Jackson 4 yard run (Wright kick)	ARK 28–3

== Personnel ==
1990 Arkansas Razorbacks football team roster
Players
Coaches
Offense

Pos.	#	Name	Class
QB	4	Quinn Grovey	Sr
RB	22	Ron Dickerson Jr.

Defense

Pos.	#	Name	Class

Special teams

Pos.	#	Name	Class

Head coach

- Jack Crowe

Coordinators/assistant coaches

Legend

- (C) Team captain
- (S) Suspended
- (I) Ineligible
- Injured
- Redshirt
