= 2001 Galleryfurniture.com Bowl =

TCU Horned Frogs	Texas A&M Aggies
(6–5)	(7–4)
Conference USA	Big 12
9	28
Head coach: Gary Patterson	Head coach: R. C. Slocum
	1	2	3	4	Total
TCU	0	7	0	2	9
Texas A&M	0	14	7	7	28
- Date: December 28, 2001
- Season: 2001
- Stadium: Reliant Astrodome
- Location: Houston, Texas
- Referee: Jim Fogltance (Pac-10)
- Attendance: 53,480
- Payout: US$750,000 per team

United States TV coverage
- Network: ESPN
- Announcers: Mark Malone, John Cooper, Rob Stone

The 2001 Galleryfurniture.com Bowl was the second edition of the college football bowl game (renamed the Houston Bowl the following year), and was played at the Reliant Astrodome in Houston, Texas. The game pitted the Texas A&M Aggies from the Big 12 Conference and the TCU Horned Frogs from Conference USA (C-USA). The game was the final competition of the 2001 football season for each team and resulted in a 28–9 Texas A&M victory. The teams were rivals in the Southwest Conference for many years.

== Game summary ==
Scoring summary

Quarter	Time	Drive			Team	Scoring information	Score	
Quarter	Time	Plays	Yards	TOP	Team	Scoring information	TCU	Texas A&M
2	14:42		1 play, 1 yard	00:02	Texas A&M	Mark Farris 1-yard touchdown run, Cody Scates kick good	0	7
2	04:00				TCU	Fumble recovery returned 89 yards for touchdown by Charlie Owens, kick good	7	7
2	01:06		8 plays, 51 yards	02:54	Texas A&M	Joe Weber 2-yard touchdown run, Cody Scates kick good	7	14
3	01:14		7 plays, 39 yards	02:55	Texas A&M	Joe Weber 14-yard touchdown run, Cody Scates kick good	7	21
4	14:40		1 plays, 82 yards	00:12	Texas A&M	Mickey Jones 89-yard touchdown reception from Mark Farris, Cody Scates kick good	7	28
4	05:45		4 plays, minus 2 yards	00:56	Texas A&M	Team safety after rush outside end zone	9	28
"TOP" = time of possession. For other American football terms, see Glossary of American football.							9	28

== See also ==
- TCU–Texas A&M football rivalry
