= 1990 Baylor Bears football team =

American college football season

1990 Baylor Bears football
- Conference: Southwest Conference
- Record: 6–4–1 (5–2–1 SWC)
- Head coach: Grant Teaff (19th season)
- Offensive coordinator: Chuck Reedy (1st season)
- Offensive scheme: I formation
- Defensive coordinator: Pete Fredenburg (8th season)
- Base defense: 4–4
- Home stadium: Floyd Casey Stadium

1990 Southwest Conference football standings
	Conf.					Overall
Team	W		L		T	W		L		T
No. 12 Texas $	8	–	0	–	0	10	–	2	–	0
No. 10 Houston	7	–	1	–	0	10	–	1	–	0
No. 15 Texas A&M	5	–	2	–	1	9	–	3	–	1
Baylor	5	–	2	–	1	6	–	4	–	1
Rice	3	–	5	–	0	5	–	6	–	0
TCU	3	–	5	–	0	5	–	6	–	0
Texas Tech	3	–	5	–	0	4	–	7	–	0
Arkansas	1	–	7	–	0	3	–	8	–	0
SMU	0	–	8	–	0	1	–	10	–	0
$ – Conference champion; Rankings from AP Poll

The 1990 Baylor Bears football team represented Baylor University as a member of the Southwest Conference (SWC) during the 1990 NCAA Division I-A football season. Led by 19th-year head coach Grant Teaff, the Bears compiled an overall record of 6–4–1 with a mark of 5–2–1 in conference play, tying for third place in the SWC. The team played home games at Floyd Casey Stadium in Waco, Texas.

== Schedule ==
Date	Time	Opponent	Site	TV	Result	Attendance	Source
September 1	6:30 p.m.	at No. 7 Nebraska*	Memorial Stadium; Lincoln, NE	ESPN	L 0–13	76,184	
September 8	9:30 p.m.	at Arizona State*	Sun Devil Stadium; Tempem, AZ		L 13–34	69,617	
September 22	7:00 p.m.	Sam Houston State*	Floyd Casey Stadium; Waco, TX		W 13–9	34,461	
September 29	7:00 p.m.	at Texas Tech	Jones Stadium; Lubbock, TX (rivalry)		W 21–15	48,926	
October 6	12:00 p.m.	No. 13 Houston	Floyd Casey Stadium; Waco, TX (rivalry)	Raycom	L 15–31	36,289	
October 13	1:00 p.m.	SMU	Floyd Casey Stadium; Waco, TX		W 52–17	30,134	
October 20	2:00 p.m.	at No. 25 Texas A&M	Kyle Field; College Station, TX (Battle of the Brazos)		T 20–20	61,017	
October 27	2:00 p.m.	at No. 24 TCU	Amon G. Carter Stadium; Fort Worth, TX (rivalry)		W 27–21	28,035	
November 10	12:00 p.m.	Arkansas^{†}	Floyd Casey Stadium; Waco, TX	Raycom	W 34–3	40,234	
November 17	12:00 p.m.	at Rice	Rice Stadium; Houston, TX	Raycom	W 17–16	22,600	
November 24	1:00 p.m.	No. 6 Texas	Floyd Casey Stadium; Waco, TX (rivalry)		L 13–23	45,649	
*Non-conference game; ^{†}Homecoming; Rankings from AP Poll released prior to the game; All times are in Central time

== Roster ==
1990 Baylor Bears football team roster
Players
Coaches
Offense

Pos.	#	Name	Class
WR	83	Melvin Bonner	Jr
QB	16	Brad Goebel	Sr

Defense

Pos.	#	Name	Class
DT	77	Santana Dotson	Jr
DB	37	Frankie Smith	Jr

Special teams

Pos.	#	Name	Class

Head coach

- Grant Teaff

Coordinators/assistant coaches

Legend

- (C) Team captain
- (S) Suspended
- (I) Ineligible
- Injured
- Redshirt
