= Robert Thomas (linebacker) =

American football player (born 1980)

No. 55, 94
- Position: Linebacker

Personal information
- Born: July 17, 1980 (age 46); El Centro, California, U.S.
- Listed height: 6 ft 0 in (1.83 m)
- Listed weight: 235 lb (107 kg)

Career information
- High school: Imperial (Imperial, California)
- College: UCLA
- NFL draft: 2002: 1st round, 31st overall pick

Career history
- St. Louis Rams (2002–2004); Green Bay Packers (2005); Oakland Raiders (2006–2008); Washington Redskins (2009)*
- * Offseason or practice squad member only

Awards and highlights
- Consensus All-American (2001); Pac-10 Defensive Player of the Year (2001); First-team All-Pac-10 (2001); Second-team All-Pac-10 (2000)

Career NFL statistics
- Games played: 84
- Total tackles: 305
- Sacks: 2
- Forced fumbles: 4
- Fumble recoveries: 2
- Interceptions: 1
- Stats at Pro Football Reference

Robert Wayne Thomas (born July 17, 1980) is an American former professional football player who was a linebacker for seven seasons in the National Football League (NFL) during the early 2000s. He played college football for the UCLA Bruins, earning recognition as a consensus All-American in 2001. The St. Louis Rams selected him in the first round of the 2002 NFL draft, and he played professionally for the Rams, Green Bay Packers and Oakland Raiders of the NFL.

== Early life ==
Thomas was born in El Centro, California. He was raised in a family with three brothers and a sister. He graduated from Imperial High School in Imperial, California, where he played for the Imperial Tigers high school football team. Thomas' older brother Stan was an offensive tackle in the NFL for four seasons during the 1990s.

Robert was on an episode of Guts as a 13 year old where he beat 12 year old Tony and an 11-year-old girl. He dominated after Tony took a “digger” according to Mike O Malley.

== College career ==
Thomas attended University of California, Los Angeles, where he was a history major and played for the UCLA Bruins football team from 1998 to 2001. As a freshman in 1998, he was a reserve inside linebacker making 26 tackles (two for losses), and playing in all 12 games. Thomas became a regular starter as a sophomore, and had 68 tackles despite missing three games. Following his 2000 junior season, he was named UCLA's Defensive Most Valuable Player and was a second-team All-Pac-10 selection after leading the team with 88 tackles (nine for losses) and six forced fumbles. As a senior in 2001, Thomas led the Bruins with 111 tackles (26 for a loss) and had 6.5 sacks, forced two fumbles and defensed five passes. He was a first-team All-Pac-10 selection and the Pac-10 Defensive Player of the Year, and was recognized as a consensus first-team All-American in 2001.

=== Awards and honors ===
- Second-team All-Pac-10 (2000)
- Butkus Award semifinalist (2000)
- First-team All-Pac-10 (2001)
- Pac-10 Defensive Player of the Year (2001)
- Consensus first-team All-American (2001)
- Butkus Award finalist (2001)
- Lombardi Award semifinalist (2001)

== Professional career ==
=== Pre-draft ===
Pre-draft measurables
Height	Weight	Arm length	Hand span	40-yard dash	10-yard split	20-yard split	20-yard shuttle	Three-cone drill	Vertical jump	Broad jump	Bench press
6 ft 0 in (1.83 m)	229 lb (104 kg)	31 in (0.79 m)	8 1/2 in (0.22 m)	4.51 s	1.53 s	2.59 s	4.10 s	7.21 s	34 in (0.86 m)	9 ft 8 in (2.95 m)	21 reps
All values from NFL Combine

=== St. Louis Rams ===
He was drafted by the St. Louis Rams 31st overall in the 2002 NFL draft. On July 22, 2002, Thomas signed a five-year $5.75 million contract with the Rams. Thomas started 30 games during his three seasons in St. Louis while totaling 163 tackles in those games.

=== Green Bay Packers ===
St. Louis traded Thomas to the Green Bay Packers at the end of training camp on September 4, 2005, for cornerback Chris Johnson. Thomas started nine games at weak-side linebacker in 2005. On May 2, 2006, the Packers released Thomas.

=== Oakland Raiders ===
On August 24, 2006, Thomas signed with Oakland Raiders, and he played in all 16 games in 2006, with no starts. On February 24, 2007, the Raiders re-signed Thomas, who was eligible to be a free agent. The deal included $1.5 million signing bonus and a $1.5 million salary for 2007 and $2 million in salary in 2008. He started 10 games for the Raiders in 2007 but appeared in just two in 2008 before suffering a season-ending hamstring injury against the Atlanta Falcons on November 2, 2008.

=== Washington Redskins ===
On April 9, 2009, the Redskins signed Thomas to a one-year $1.3 million contract. He was released by the Redskins after the final preseason game on September 9, 2009.

=== NFL statistics ===
Year	Team	Games	Combined tackles	Tackles	Assisted tackles	Sacks	Forced fumbles	Fumble recoveries	Fumble return yards	Interceptions	Interception return yards	Yards per interception return	Longest interception return	Passes defended
2002	STL	16	36	33	3	0.0	1	0	0	0	0	0	0	2
2003	STL	12	71	62	9	2.0	0	1	0	0	0	0	0	3
2004	STL	14	56	41	15	0.0	0	0	0	0	0	0	0	1
2005	GB	10	41	30	11	0.0	0	0	0	1	24	24	24	1
2006	OAK	16	36	27	9	0.0	1	1	0	0	0	0	0	1
2007	OAK	14	62	51	11	0.0	2	0	0	0	0	0	0	0
2008	OAK	2	2	1	1	0.0	0	0	0	0	0	0	0	0
Career		84	304	245	59	2.0	4	2	0	1	24	24	24	8
