= 1990 Rice Owls football team =

American college football season

1990 Rice Owls football
- Conference: Southwest Conference
- Record: 5–6 (3–5 SWC)
- Head coach: Fred Goldsmith (2nd season)
- Offensive coordinator: Mike Heimerdinger (2nd season)
- Defensive coordinator: Craig Bohl (2nd season)
- Home stadium: Rice Stadium

1990 Southwest Conference football standings
	Conf.					Overall
Team	W		L		T	W		L		T
No. 12 Texas $	8	–	0	–	0	10	–	2	–	0
No. 10 Houston	7	–	1	–	0	10	–	1	–	0
No. 15 Texas A&M	5	–	2	–	1	9	–	3	–	1
Baylor	5	–	2	–	1	6	–	4	–	1
Rice	3	–	5	–	0	5	–	6	–	0
TCU	3	–	5	–	0	5	–	6	–	0
Texas Tech	3	–	5	–	0	4	–	7	–	0
Arkansas	1	–	7	–	0	3	–	8	–	0
SMU	0	–	8	–	0	1	–	10	–	0
$ – Conference champion; Rankings from AP Poll

The 1990 Rice Owls football team was an American football team that represented Rice University in the Southwest Conference during the 1990 NCAA Division I-A football season. In their second year under head coach Fred Goldsmith, the team compiled a 5–6 record.

== Schedule ==
Date	Opponent	Site	Result	Attendance	Source
September 1	Wake Forest*	Rice Stadium; Houston, TX	W 33–17	27,100	
September 8	Tulane*	Rice Stadium; Houston, TX	L 10–21	20,200	
September 22	Northwestern*	Rice Stadium; Houston, TX	W 31–14	15,300	
September 29	at No. 13 Houston	Houston Astrodome; Houston, TX (rivalry)	L 22–24	24,130	
October 6	Texas	Rice Stadium; Houston, TX (rivalry)	L 10–26	34,800	
October 13	at TCU	Amon G. Carter Stadium; Fort Worth, TX	L 28–38	23,704	
October 20	Texas Tech	Rice Stadium; Houston, TX	W 42–21	15,200	
October 27	at Texas A&M	Kyle Field; College Station, TX	L 15–41	52,158	
November 3	at Arkansas	War Memorial Stadium; Little Rock, AR	W 19–11	42,860	
November 10	SMU	Rice Stadium; Houston, TX (rivalry)	W 30–28	17,900	
November 17	Baylor	Rice Stadium; Houston, TX	L 16–17	22,600	
*Non-conference game; Rankings from AP Poll released prior to the game
