= 1990 SMU Mustangs football team =

American college football season

1990 SMU Mustangs football
- Conference: Southwest Conference
- Record: 1–10 (0–8 SWC)
- Head coach: Forrest Gregg (2nd season)
- Offensive coordinator: Larry Kueck (1st season)
- Offensive scheme: Run and shoot
- Defensive coordinator: Jon Tenuta (1st season)
- Base defense: 4–3
- Home stadium: Ownby Stadium

1990 Southwest Conference football standings
	Conf.					Overall
Team	W		L		T	W		L		T
No. 12 Texas $	8	–	0	–	0	10	–	2	–	0
No. 10 Houston	7	–	1	–	0	10	–	1	–	0
No. 15 Texas A&M	5	–	2	–	1	9	–	3	–	1
Baylor	5	–	2	–	1	6	–	4	–	1
Rice	3	–	5	–	0	5	–	6	–	0
TCU	3	–	5	–	0	5	–	6	–	0
Texas Tech	3	–	5	–	0	4	–	7	–	0
Arkansas	1	–	7	–	0	3	–	8	–	0
SMU	0	–	8	–	0	1	–	10	–	0
$ – Conference champion; Rankings from AP Poll

The 1990 SMU Mustangs football team represented Southern Methodist University (SMU) as a member of the Southwest Conference (SWC) during the 1990 NCAA Division I-A football season. Led by Forrest Gregg in his second and final year as head coach, the Mustangs compiled an overall record of 1–10 with a mark of 0–8 in conference play, placing last out of nine teams in the SWC. SMU opened the season with a 44–7 win over Vanderbilt, but struggled the remainder of the season still recovering from the NCAA's death penalty, which barred SMU from competing in 1987 and 1988. The Mustangs offense scored 197 points while the defense allowed 426 points. Gregg, who retired after the season to serve full-time as SMU's athletic director, was carried off the field following a loss to Arkansas in the season finale.

== Schedule ==
Date	Opponent	Site	Result	Attendance	Source
September 8	Vanderbilt*	Ownby Stadium; University Park, TX	W 44–7	18,700	
September 15	at Tulane*	Louisiana Superdome; New Orleans, LA	L 7–43	20,434	
September 29	TCU	Ownby Stadium; University Park, TX (rivalry)	L 21–42	20,100	
October 6	at North Texas*	Fouts Field; Denton, TX (rivalry)	L 7–14	22,750	
October 13	at Baylor	Floyd Casey Stadium; Waco, TX	L 17–52	30,134	
October 20	No. 9 Houston	Ownby Stadium; University Park, TX (rivalry)	L 17–44	23,250	
October 27	at No. 13 Texas	Texas Memorial Stadium; Austin, TX	L 3–52	65,128	
November 3	Texas A&M	Ownby Stadium; University Park, TX	L 17–38	23,783	
November 10	at Rice	Rice Stadium; Houston, TX (rivalry)	L 28–30	17,900	
November 17	at Texas Tech	Jones Stadium; Lubbock, TX	L 7–62	31,355	
November 24	Arkansas	Ownby Stadium; University Park, TX	L 29–42	17,100	
*Non-conference game; Rankings from AP Poll released prior to the game
