= Alex Waits =

Scottish gridiron football player (born 1968)

No. 5
- Position: Punter

Personal information
- Born: June 21, 1968 (age 58); Glasgow, Scotland
- Listed height: 6 ft 2 in (1.88 m)
- Listed weight: 208 lb (94 kg)

Career information
- High school: Plano East
- College: Texas
- NFL draft: 1991: undrafted

Career history
- Seattle Seahawks (1991); Miami Dolphins (1992)*
- * Offseason or practice squad member only

Awards and highlights
- First-team All-SWC (1990)

Career NFL statistics
- Punts: 14
- Punt yards: 474
- Longest punt: 50
- Stats at Pro Football Reference

Alexander John Waits (born June 21, 1968) is a former American football punter who played for the Seattle Seahawks of the National Football League (NFL). He played college football at University of Texas.
