= 1990 Houston Cougars football team =

American college football season

1990 Houston Cougars football
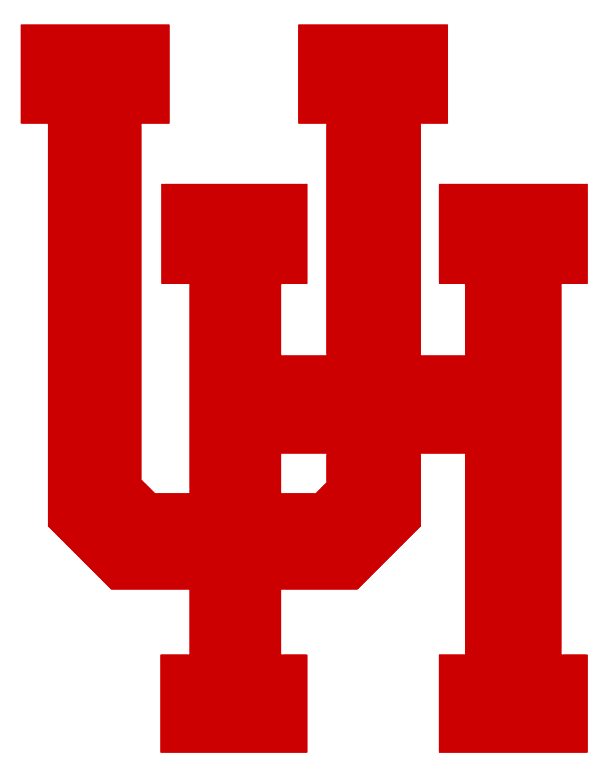
- Conference: Southwest Conference

Ranking
- AP: No. 10
- Record: 10–1 (7–1 SWC)
- Head coach: John Jenkins (1st season)
- Offensive scheme: Run and shoot
- Defensive coordinator: Larry Coyer (1st season)
- Base defense: 4–3
- Captains: Reggie Burnette; Manny Hazard; Jason Jessup; Chuck Weatherspoon
- Home stadium: Houston Astrodome

1990 Southwest Conference football standings
	Conf.					Overall
Team	W		L		T	W		L		T
No. 12 Texas $	8	–	0	–	0	10	–	2	–	0
No. 10 Houston	7	–	1	–	0	10	–	1	–	0
No. 15 Texas A&M	5	–	2	–	1	9	–	3	–	1
Baylor	5	–	2	–	1	6	–	4	–	1
Rice	3	–	5	–	0	5	–	6	–	0
TCU	3	–	5	–	0	5	–	6	–	0
Texas Tech	3	–	5	–	0	4	–	7	–	0
Arkansas	1	–	7	–	0	3	–	8	–	0
SMU	0	–	8	–	0	1	–	10	–	0
$ – Conference champion; Rankings from AP Poll

The 1990 Houston Cougars football team represented the University of Houston during the 1990 NCAA Division I-A football season. The Cougars were led by first-year head coach John Jenkins and played their home games at the Houston Astrodome in Houston, Texas. The team competed as members of the Southwest Conference, finishing in second. Due to NCAA sanctions, Houston was ineligible to be invited to a bowl game and was banned from being ranked in the Coaches Poll, although this year the Cougars were on television. The Cougars lost only once in the season, to eventual SWC champion, Texas, and were ranked tenth in the final AP poll of the year. Their last regular season game was played in Tokyo, in the Coca-Cola Classic.

Quarterback David Klingler finished third in voting for the Heisman Trophy, leading the nation with 54 passing touchdowns and 374 completions. His 5,140 passing yards trailed only Heisman-winner Ty Detmer of BYU.

== Schedule ==
Date	Opponent	Rank	Site	TV	Result	Attendance	Source
September 8	UNLV*	No. 24	Houston Astrodome; Houston, TX		W 37–9	20,138	
September 13	at Texas Tech	No. 18	Jones Stadium; Lubbock, TX (rivalry)	ESPN	W 51–35	36,794	
September 29	Rice	No. 13	Houston Astrodome; Houston, TX (rivalry)		W 24–22	24,130	
October 6	at Baylor	No. 13	Floyd Casey Stadium; Waco, TX (rivalry)	Raycom	W 31–15	36,289	
October 13	No. 20 Texas A&M	No. 12	Houston Astrodome; Houston, TX		W 36–31	45,141	
October 20	at SMU	No. 9	Ownby Stadium; University Park, TX (rivalry)		W 44–17	23,250	
October 27	Arkansas	No. 6	Houston Astrodome; Houston, TX	Raycom	W 62–28	27,352	
November 3	TCU^{†}	No. 6	Houston Astrodome; Houston, TX		W 56–35	25,725	
November 10	at No. 14 Texas	No. 3	Texas Memorial Stadium; Austin, TX	ESPN	L 24–45	82,457	
November 17	Eastern Washington*	No. 12	Houston Astrodome; Houston, TX		W 84–21	17,050	
December 2	vs. Arizona State*	No. 11	Tokyo Dome; Tokyo, Japan (Coca-Cola Classic)	TBS	W 62–45	50,000	
*Non-conference game; ^{†}Homecoming; Rankings from AP Poll released prior to the game

== Rankings ==
Ranking movements Legend: ██ Increase in ranking ██ Decrease in ranking ( ) = First-place votes
	Week															
Poll	Pre	1	2	3	4	5	6	7	8	9	10	11	12	13	14	Final
AP	24	24	18	14	13	13	12	9	6 (1)	6 (2)	3 (5)	12	12	11	9	10
Coaches		Not released														

== Game summaries ==
=== Texas A&M ===
Texas A&M at Houston

Team	1	2	3	4	Total
No. 20 Aggies	17	7	7	0	31
• No. 12 Cougars	7	10	10	9	36

- Date: October 13
- Location: Astrodome, Houston, Texas
- Game attendance: 45,141
- Game weather: Indoors

Scoring summary
1		A&M	Darren Lewis 47-yard run (Talbot kick)	A&M 7–0
1		A&M	Layne Talbot 33-yard field goal	A&M 10–0
1	5:16	A&M	Darren Lewis 9-yard run (Talbot kick)	A&M 17–0
1	2:40	HOU	Manny Hazard 14-yard pass from David Klingler (Anderson kick)	A&M 17–7
2		A&M	Darren Lewis 4-yard run (Talbot kick)	A&M 24–7
2		HOU	Chuck Weatherspoon 1-yard run (Anderson kick)	A&M 24–14
2	0:00	HOU	Roman Anderson 39-yard field goal	A&M 24–17
3		HOU	David Klingler 1-yard run (Anderson kick)	Tied 24–24
3	6:40	HOU	Roman Anderson 23-yard field goal	Houston 27–24
3		A&M	Darren Lewis 12-yard run (Talbot kick)	A&M 31–27
4	12:33	HOU	Roman Anderson 34-yard field goal	A&M 31–30
4	0:20	HOU	Chuck Weatherspoon 1-yard run (pass failed)	Houston 36–31

The Cougars drove 95 yards for the game-winning touchdown, a 1-yard run by Chuck Weatherspoon with 20 seconds remaining. Weatherspoon accounted for 218 yards from scrimmage (131 rushing) and 2 touchdowns. David Klingler passed for 352 yards and had 2 touchdowns (1 rushing).

=== Vs. Arizona State ===
In the 62–45 victory over the Sun Devils, David Klingler set the Division I-A single-game passing record with 716 yards.

== Roster ==
1990 Houston Cougars football team roster
Players
Coaches
Offense

Pos.	#	Name	Class
WR	20	Manny Hazard	Sr
QB	7	David Klingler	Jr
RB	28	Chuck Weatherspoon	Sr

Defense

Pos.	#	Name	Class
LB		Reggie Burnette	Sr
LB		Glenn Cadrez	Jr
LB		Ryan McCoy	So

Special teams

Pos.	#	Name	Class
K		Roman Anderson	Jr

Head coach

- John Jenkins

Coordinators/assistant coaches

Legend

- (C) Team captain
- (S) Suspended
- (I) Ineligible
- Injured
- Redshirt
