= Stan Thomas (American football) =

American football player (born 1968)

No. 60, 70
- Position: Offensive tackle

Personal information
- Born: October 28, 1968 (age 58); El Centro, California, U.S.
- Listed height: 6 ft 5 in (1.96 m)
- Listed weight: 295 lb (134 kg)

Career information
- High school: Central Union (El Centro, California)
- College: Texas
- NFL draft: 1991: 1st round, 22nd overall pick

Career history
- Chicago Bears (1991–1992); Atlanta Falcons (1993)*; Houston Oilers (1993–1994)
- * Offseason or practice squad member only

Awards and highlights
- Second-team All-American (1990); First-team All-SWC (1990)

Career NFL statistics
- Games played: 56
- Games started: 7
- Stats at Pro Football Reference

Stan Thomas (born October 28, 1968) is an American former professional football player who was an offensive tackle in the National Football League (NFL) for four seasons for the Chicago Bears and Houston Oilers from 1991 to 1994, and prior to that played four years of college football at the University of Texas.

== College career ==
He was a 3-year starter as tackle, including his freshman year, when the Longhorns won the last Bluebonnet Bowl game ever in 1987, but did not play his sophomore year. In his senior year at Texas, he was 1st-team All Southwest Conference and a 2nd Team All-American on a team that won the Southwest Conference Championship and played for the National Championship in the Cotton Bowl. He took heat for predicting a win and calling Miami arrogant, especially after Texas was beaten soundly. In 1990 he was named a UPI All-American Team Honorable Mention.

== Professional career ==
Thomas was selected by the Bears in the first round of the 1991 NFL draft with the 22nd overall pick. During the preseason before his rookie year he suffered both knee and shoulder injuries, but he was an opening day starter anyway due to a season-ending injury to Jim Covert, though he was benched later in the season with a foot injury.

Shortly after his rookie season Thomas was shot in the head in a drive-by shooting in San Diego and required surgery to remove bullet fragments from his skull. He recovered enough to return to the Bears for the 1992 season, but the injury and the event caused a loss of confidence that sent him into drinking, partying and careless spending.

Going into the 1993 season, Thomas was arrested for drunk driving and then traded to the Atlanta Falcons for a conditional middle-round draft choice after refusing to report for camp and demanding a trade. He was waived by the Falcons a week later after he refused to restructure his contract. He was then signed by the Oilers as a backup. During that time he was carjacked at gunpoint, his parents were sentenced to prison for tax fraud and he had to pay the IRS $300,000 to settle his own tax issues.

Prior to the 1995 season, he suffered a hamstring injury and then was involved in a fight with rookie center Hicham El-Mashtoub that left him with stitches and got him kicked off the team, ending his career.

He is considered to be one of the worst draft picks by the Chicago Bears.

== Personal life ==
In 2004, he was arrested and charged with rape and sodomy in San Diego County, but the DA decided not to file charges.

He is the older brother of All-American and 1st round NFL pick Robert Thomas
