= 1991 Cotton Bowl Classic =

1991 Mobil Cotton Bowl Classic
- 55th Cotton Bowl Classic
- The Cotton Bowl in Dallas, Texas, hosted the Cotton Bowl Classic.
Miami Hurricanes	Texas Longhorns
(9–2)	(10–1)
Independent	SWC
46	3
Head coach: Dennis Erickson	Head coach: David McWilliams
AP / Coaches; 4 / 4	AP / Coaches; 3 / 3
	1	2	3	4	Total
Miami	12	7	14	13	46
Texas	0	3	0	0	3
- Date: January 1, 1991
- Season: 1990
- Stadium: Cotton Bowl
- Location: Dallas, Texas
- MVP: Craig Erickson, QB, Miami (FL); Russell Maryland, DT, Miami (FL)
- Referee: Jimmy Harper (SEC)
- Attendance: 73,521

United States TV coverage
- Network: CBS
- Announcers: Jim Nantz (play-by-play), Tim Brant (color), Andrea Joyce (host), Mike Francesa (host), John Dockery (sideline)

The 1991 Mobil Cotton Bowl Classic was a post-season college football game played on January 1, 1991. It pitted the #3 Texas Longhorns, champions of the Southwest Conference, against the independent #4 Miami Hurricanes.

== Team backgrounds ==
Miami entered the game having only lost to BYU and Notre Dame. Texas had stunned Penn State on the road 17-13 to open its season, then lost at home to Colorado 29-22 before winning nine straight games, including wins over then #4 Oklahoma and then #3 Houston to win the Southwest Conference championship.

== Game summary ==
Miami led 19-3 at halftime, but put the game out of reach with two touchdowns within five minutes in the third quarter. The Hurricanes also set Cotton Bowl and school records for most penalties (15) and most penalty yards (202) in a single game, many of which were for unsportsmanlike conduct. Partly as a result of controversy from this game, the NCAA instituted a new rule stipulating that excessive celebration would be a 15-yard penalty. In the pre-Internet era, many established newspaper reporters castigated the Hurricanes' players and coaches for Miami's actions, with some reporters demanding that coach Dennis Erickson be suspended or fired and that the game result be vacated and the win given to Texas. These calls were ignored.

== Aftermath ==
The next season, Miami claimed the AP Poll National Championship by going 12-0, ending with a 22-0 victory over Nebraska in the Orange Bowl.

Texas went 5-6 in their next season (and fired coach David McWilliams), did not play in another New Year's Day bowl game until 1995, and did not win another New Year's Day bowl game until the 1999 Cotton Bowl victory.

== Scoring summary ==
Scoring summary

Quarter	Time	Drive			Team	Scoring information	Score	
Quarter	Time	Plays	Yards	TOP	Team	Scoring information	Miami	Texas
1	8:53	3	4		Miami	28-yard field goal by Carlos Huerta	3	0
1	5:26	5	16		Miami	50-yard field goal by Carlos Huerta	6	0
1	0:11	2	9		Miami	Wesley Carroll 12-yard touchdown reception from Craig Erickson, 2-point pass failed	12	0
2	7:43	9	46		Texas	29-yard field goal by Michael Pollak	12	3
2	0:11	2	21		Miami	Wesley Carroll 24-yard touchdown reception from Craig Erickson, Carlos Huerta kick good	19	3
3	11:46	–	–		Miami	Interception returned 34 yards for touchdown by Darrin Smith, Carlos Huerta kick good	26	3
3	6:09	3	63		Miami	Randal Hill 48-yard touchdown reception from Craig Erickson, Carlos Huerta kick good	33	3
4	10:56	12	66		Miami	Randy Bethel 4-yard touchdown reception from Craig Erickson, Carlos Huerta kick no good (blocked)	39	3
4	9:23	3	26		Miami	Leonard Conley 26-yard touchdown run, Carlos Huerta kick good	46	3
"TOP" = time of possession. For other American football terms, see Glossary of American football.							46	3
