= Brian Jones (American football linebacker) =

American football player and broadcaster (born 1968)

No. 56, 53, 58
- Position: Linebacker

Personal information
- Born: January 22, 1968 (age 58); Iowa City, Iowa, U.S.
- Listed height: 6 ft 1 in (1.85 m)
- Listed weight: 250 lb (113 kg)

Career information
- High school: Dunbar (Lubbock, Texas)
- College: Texas
- NFL draft: 1991: 8th round, 213th overall pick

Career history
- Los Angeles Raiders (1991)*; Indianapolis Colts (1991); Miami Dolphins (1992)*; Los Angeles Raiders (1994)*; Scottish Claymores (1995); New Orleans Saints (1995–1998)
- * Offseason or practice squad member only

Awards and highlights
- First-team All-SWC (1990); Aloha Bowl champion (1987); Freedom Bowl champion (1986)

Career NFL statistics
- Tackles: 67
- Sacks: 1
- Forced fumbles: 1
- Fumble recoveries: 2
- Stats at Pro Football Reference

Brian Keith Jones (born January 22, 1968) is an American sports radio and television host and former football linebacker. Jones played one year of college football at UCLA and then transferred to University of Texas at Austin (Texas); Jones was selected by the Los Angeles Raiders in the eighth round of the 1991 NFL draft. Jones played NFL professional football for six seasons.

== Early life and college ==
Born in Iowa City, Iowa, Brian Jones grew up in Lubbock, Texas, and graduated from Dunbar High School of Lubbock in 1986. Recruited by several colleges, Jones first attended the University of California, Los Angeles (UCLA) and played on the UCLA Bruins football team for Terry Donahue before transferring to the University of Texas at Austin in 1988. He then played the 1989 and 1990 seasons for the Texas Longhorns football team. As a senior in Texas's 1990 Southwest Conference (SWC) title run, Jones was an All-SWC selection.

== Professional football playing career ==
Jones was drafted by the Los Angeles Raiders in the 8th round of the 1991 NFL draft and was cut by the Raiders at the end of the 1991 training camp. He was picked up by the Indianapolis Colts and spent the season with them, playing in 11 games including one start.

He was signed by the Miami Dolphins as a Plan B Free Agent in 1992 and waived by them in camp. He was waived by the Raiders in the 1993 and 1994 camps.

In 1995, he played the Scottish Claymores of the NFL Europe and a few weeks after the season ended he signed with the New Orleans Saints with which he would spend the next four seasons. That first season he played in all 16 games and started 7, recording 47 tackles . The next season he again played in all 16 games with a single start and recorded his only TD, on an 11 yard fumble recovery. He Also led the team in special teams tackles.

Jones sat out the 1997 season because of injuries and played only in one NFL game in 1998 before being cut.

In 1999, Jones filed a workers' compensation claim over his 1997 injury, but the Saints and Louisiana Workers' Compensation Corporation filed a Peremptory Exception of Prescription that was upheld by the Louisiana Circuit Courts of Appeal in 2001.

== Media career ==
After retiring from pro football, Jones moved to Los Angeles, California, to try to start an acting career. After a few years, Jones returned to the University of Texas at Austin in spring 2000 to finish his corporate communications degree. He also hosted a weekday afternoon talk show on sports radio station KVET (AM) "1300 the Zone". Jones finished his degree by spring 2002 and became the first person in his family to graduate from college. He later moved on to working in sports television as a sideline audio tech, and later a sports reporter for University of Texas football games and a sports reporter for Fox Sports Southwest. In 2013, Jones joined CBS Sports Radio as co-host of the afternoon drive time program MoJo on CBS with the long-time broadcaster Chris Moore. In February 2015 CBS Sports moved Brian to the early morning show, with sportscaster Greg Gianotti, co-hosting "Gio and Jones in the Morning" . In March 2013 Jones was added by CBS Sports to be an analyst on College Football Today, the pre-game show for the SEC on CBS. Jones is a college football analyst with Adam Zucker of the CBS weekly Saturday morning college football program, with his former UCLA colleague UCLA football Coach Rick Neuheisel In 2017, Jones and co-host Gwen Lawrence launched the Better Man show and BetterManShow.com , a nationally syndicated lifestyle TV program for men. The Better Man show is currently syndicated to more than 73 million homes.

In October, 2020 the internet sportsbook BetUS announced NFL Hall of Famer Warren Sapp and Brian Jones as the hosts of the weekly podcast "BetUS Unfiltered". Sapp and Jones have interviewed celebrities such as Derrick Johnson, Adam Schefter, Ray Lewis, Kevin Carter, Rick Neuheisel, and Jen Welter on the podcast.
