= David McWilliams (American football) =

American football player and coach (born 1942)

Biographical details
- Born: April 18, 1942 (age 84); Cleburne, Texas, U.S.

Playing career
- 1961–1963: Texas
- Positions: Center, defensive tackle

Coaching career (HC unless noted)
- 1964–1965: Abilene HS (TX) (assistant)
- 1966–1969: Abilene HS (TX)
- 1970–1981: Texas (DE/LB)
- 1982–1985: Texas (DC)
- 1986: Texas Tech
- 1987–1991: Texas

Head coaching record
- Overall: 38–30 (college); 21–17–2 (high school)
- Bowls: 1–1

Accomplishments and honors

Championships
- As coach: SWC (1990); As player: National champion (1963)

Awards
- 2x SWC Coach of the Year (1986, 1990)

David McWilliams (born April 18, 1942) is an American former college football player and coach. He served as the head coach at Texas Tech University in 1986 and at the University of Texas at Austin from 1987 to 1991, compiling a career college football record of 38–30.

== Early life and playing career ==
Raised in Cleburne, Texas, McWilliams' long tenure with the Longhorn football program started as a player from 1961 to 1963, when he helped the team compile a record of 30–2–1. During that time, the squad won a national championship, three Southwest Conference championships, and finished the year ranked among the nation's top four each year. He served as a tri-captain during the 1963 season, and was also a member of the Texas Cowboys.

== Coaching career ==
After graduating, McWilliams served two years as an assistant coach at Abilene High School in Texas, and in 1966, became one of the state's youngest head coaches, carving out a record of 21–17–2 in four years before Darrell Royal hired him in 1970.

For the next 16 years, he was an assistant under both Royal and Fred Akers, working on defense with ends and linebackers for Royal and Akers, then serving as defensive coordinator for Akers from 1982 to 1985. McWilliams then spent the 1986 season as head coach at Texas Tech, leading the Red Raiders to a win over Texas and a bowl bid, before returning as head coach of the Longhorns the following year.

McWilliams finished 7–5 in his first season at the helm for the Longhorns that included a dramatic last-play victory over the Arkansas Razorbacks and a bowl win over Pittsburgh. However, a 4–7 season the next year, which included a 66–15 loss to Houston, followed by a 5–6 year in 1989, put McWilliams' job status in question. In 1990, the Longhorns bounced back with a 10–1 regular-season record. Fueled by what became known as the "Shock the Nation" tour, Texas won the SWC championship—the only loss coming at the hands of eventual national champion, Colorado. Texas entered the New Year's Day Cotton Bowl Classic ranked number three in the nation, but was defeated by Miami, 46–3. The resurgence gave rise to talk of a national title in 1991, but when Texas disappointed with a 5–6 record, McWilliams resigned. His final record with the Longhorns is 31–26.

== Later life and honors ==
McWilliams remained in the Texas athletics department, serving as associate athletics director for development before becoming head of the T-Association, an athletic alumni group. He was inducted into the Longhorn Hall of Honor in 1993 and the Texas High School Football Hall of Fame in 1998.

== Head coaching record ==
=== College ===
Year	Team	Overall	Conference	Standing	Bowl/playoffs	Coaches^{#}	AP^{°}
Texas Tech Red Raiders (Southwest Conference) (1986)
1986	Texas Tech	7–4*	5–3	T–4th	Independence*		
Texas Tech:		7–4	5–3	*Dykes coached bowl game after McWilliams left for Texas.			
Texas Longhorns (Southwest Conference) (1987–1991)
1987	Texas	7–5	5–2	T–2nd	W Astro-Bluebonnet	19	
1988	Texas	4–7	2–5	T–5th			
1989	Texas	5–6	4–4	T–5th			
1990	Texas	10–2	8–0	1st	L Cotton	11	12
1991	Texas	5–6	4–4	T–5th			
Texas:		31–26	23–15				
Total:		38–30					
National championship Conference title Conference division title or championship game berth
^{#}Rankings from final Coaches Poll.; ^{°}Rankings from final AP Poll.
