= Kerry Cash =

American football player (born 1969)

No. 88, 84
- Position: Tight end

Personal information
- Born: August 7, 1969 (age 57); San Antonio, Texas, U.S.
- Listed height: 6 ft 4 in (1.93 m)
- Listed weight: 245 lb (111 kg)

Career information
- College: Texas
- NFL draft: 1991: 5th round, 125th overall pick

Career history
- Indianapolis Colts (1991–1994); Oakland Raiders (1995); Miami Dolphins (1996)*; Chicago Bears (1996)
- * Offseason or practice squad member only

Awards and highlights
- All-American (1990)

Career NFL statistics
- Receptions: 132
- Receiving yards: 1,427
- Touchdowns: 9
- Stats at Pro Football Reference

Kerry Lenard Cash (born August 7, 1969) is an American former professional football player in the National Football League (NFL). He played tight end for six seasons for the Indianapolis Colts, Miami Dolphins, Oakland Raiders and Chicago Bears. He played college football player for the Texas Longhorns, where he was an All-American, and was selected by the Indianapolis Colts in the fifth round of the 1991 NFL draft.

== Early life ==
Cash was born in San Antonio, Texas. He has a twin brother, Keith Cash, who played football with him in middle school, high school and at Texas and who also played in the NFL.

Keith and Kerry Cash attended Pease Middle School in San Antonio, where they won the district championship in football, basketball, and track in 1982–1983.

As high school athletes, Keith and Kerry Cash led Oliver Wendell Holmes High School in San Antonio to the 5A state semi-finals in football against Houston Yates in 1985 and to the 5A Texas state championship game in basketball in 1987.

Cash, his brother and his teammate Johnny Walker were all top recruits and all signed with Texas. They went on to make up the team's top three receivers in 1990.

== College career ==
Cash played tight end at Texas from 1987 to 1990.

During his freshman year, he played in five games, helping the Longhorns to win the 1987 Astro-Bluebonnet Bowl.

He became a starter during the next season. Against Oklahoma he caught an 80-yard pass from Bret Stafford which was the longest reception not to go for a touchdown, and the sixth-longest reception, in school history at the time.

In his senior year, he helped Texas to win the Southwest Conference Championship and to stay in the National Championship hunt through the whole season culminating in the 1991 Cotton Bowl loss to Miami. He had 104 yards receiving against Texas Tech that year, which at the time was the third-best single-game performance by a tight end in school history. For his performance, he was named to the Newspaper Enterprise Association's All-American team, was a UPI All-American Team Honorable Mention and was second-team all-Southwest Conference.

He left Texas with 71 receptions, 10 receiving touchdowns and 979 receiving yards. He set the school record for career receptions and touchdown receptions by a tight end, both of which were surpassed by Pat Fitzgerald in 1996; and had what was at the time the second-most receiving yards by a tight end in school history.

When his senior year was over, he played in the 1991 East-West Shrine Bowl.

== Professional career ==
=== Indianapolis Colts ===
Cash was selected 125th overall by the Indianapolis Colts in the fifth round of the 1991 NFL draft.

After seeing playing time and making one catch in the first four games of the 1991 season, he went onto the injured reserve for the remainder of the season after having ankle surgery.

In a 1992 preseason game, the Colts played against Keith Cash's Kansas City Chiefs, marking the first time identical twins played against each other in an NFL game. On one special teams play, they even lined up across from one another. Later they both agreed that Keith had gotten the better of Kerry on that play. The 1992 season was Cash's most productive, racking up 43 receptions for 521 yards and three touchdowns. That season he had a career high 104 yard receiving game against the Jets. In that game, he set up the game winning touchdown with two key receptions on the scoring drive, but had to leave the game with an injury.

In 1993 he again had 43 receptions for three touchdowns but only had 402 yards that season.

He became a free agent at the end of the 1993 season and re-signed with the Colts in the summer. He became a smaller part of the offense that year, seeing less than half as many targets and getting only 16 receptions for 190 yards and one touchdown. He again became a free agent at the end of the season but would not re-sign with the Colts.

=== Oakland Raiders ===
Cash signed with the Raiders in March 1995. He played in all 16 games, starting 10 and caught 40 passes for 254 yards and two touchdowns. He was released by the Raiders in July 1996.

=== Miami Dolphins ===
A few days after being released by the Raiders, Cash was signed by the Dolphins, but the Dolphins cut him during training camp.

=== Chicago Bears ===
Late in the 1996 season, Cash was signed by the Bears after they put Keith Jennings on injured reserve with a broken right fibula. He played in their last three games that season, started the final two, and caught four passes for 42 yards. He became a free agent in February 1997, was re-signed by the Bears five weeks later and then released by the Bears at the end of April.

== Later life ==
In 1999, Kerry and his brother Keith served as general managers of the Texas Terminators in the Indoor Professional Football League.

In 2009 Cash was an assistant coach with the Austin Turfcats.

Since 2012, Cash has worked as a precious metals specialist with the United States Gold Bureau in Austin, Texas. He has three sons. His eldest son, Isaiah – whose mother was captain and MVP of the Texas Longhorn Soccer Team in the 1990s – plays football for Virginia Tech after transferring from Sam Houston State University where he played football and ran track. In 2020 he won the gold medal in the long jump at the Southland Conference Indoor Track & Field Championships with a program record mark of 7.44 meters (24-5) and also set the program record in the long jump outdoors with a mark of 7.45 (24-5.5).
