= Wesley Carroll (wide receiver) =

American football player (born 1967)

No. 80, 86
- Position: Wide receiver

Personal information
- Born: September 6, 1967 (age 59); Cleveland, Ohio, U.S.
- Listed height: 6 ft 0 in (1.83 m)
- Listed weight: 183 lb (83 kg)

Career information
- High school: John Hay (Cleveland)
- College: Miami
- NFL draft: 1991: 2nd round, 42nd overall pick

Career history
- New Orleans Saints (1991–1992); Cincinnati Bengals (1993); Indianapolis Colts (1994)*; Kansas City Chiefs (1994-1995)*
- * Offseason or practice squad member only

Awards and highlights
- 2× National champion (1987, 1989); 2× Second-team All-American (1989, 1990)

Career NFL statistics
- Receptions: 42
- Receiving yards: 557
- Touchdowns: 3
- Stats at Pro Football Reference

Wesley Byron Carroll (born September 6, 1967) is an American former professional football player who was a wide receiver in the National Football League (NFL). He played three years for the New Orleans Saints and Cincinnati Bengals. He played college football for the Miami Hurricanes, earning second-team All-American honors in 1990. He was selected in the second round of the 1991 NFL draft by the Saints with the 42nd overall pick.
