= TCU–Texas A&M football rivalry =

American college football rivalry

- TCU Horned Frogs Texas A&M Aggies
- First meeting: November 13, 1897; TCU 30, Texas A&M 6
- Latest meeting: December 28, 2001; Texas A&M 28, TCU 9

Statistics
- Total meetings: 92
- All-time series: Texas A&M leads, 56–29–7
- Largest victory: Texas A&M, 74–10 (1986)
- Longest win streak: Texas A&M, 24 (1973–present)
- Current win streak: Texas A&M, 24 (1973–present)

Locations of TCU and Texas A&M

The TCU–Texas A&M football rivalry is an American college football rivalry between the TCU Horned Frogs and Texas A&M Aggies. After 72 consecutive meetings as members of the Southwest Conference (SWC) from 1924 to 1995, the series has yet to be scheduled in the regular season as a non-conference game since the SWC disbanded in 1996. In the most recent game between the two programs, the Aggies defeated the Horned Frogs 28–9 at the 2001 Galleryfurniture.com Bowl in Houston, Texas.

== History ==
TCU and Texas A&M played 19 times before they were both in the Southwest Conference that was made up of Arkansas, Oklahoma, and Texas universities. Until the early 1990s the conference started to fall apart when the University of Arkansas announced that they will move to the Southeastern Conference. In 1994, Texas A&M announced with other Texas schools, that they will join the Big Eight Conference to form the Big 12 Conference. TCU did not receive an invitation to join with Texas A&M, and so TCU moved to the Western Athletic Conference in 1996, Conference USA in 2001, and then the Mountain West Conference in 2005. In 2012, TCU finally got the chance to move to the Big 12 Conference with its other Texas rivals except for one, Texas A&M. Texas A&M moved to the Southeastern Conference in 2012. The future of the rivalry is uncertain.

Over the life of the series, the Aggies have shutout the Horned Frogs 21 times, and been shutout 9 times (including scoreless ties in 1909 and 1927). The Aggies hold the largest margin of victory with a 74–10 win in College Station on November 22, 1986 (the Aggies also hold the next ten-largest margins of victory, with each ranging from 34 to 56 points). The Aggies' current winning streak of 24 games from 1973 to 1995 and including the 2001 Galleryfurniture.com Bowl is the longest in the series.

At a yell practice before the 1930 TCU game, A&M Board of Regents member Pinky Downs '06 shouted, "What are we going to do to those Horned Frogs?" His muse did not fail him as he repeated a term used by Aggies since at least 1917, including in its yearbook (1922), as used in the Houston Post in 1927, and the Austin American Statesmen in 1928 in connection with the A&M College of Texas -“Gig 'em, Aggies!" with the addition of a hand signal - a fist with his thumb extended straight up. The association of the physical action and the phrase stuck, and with that the first hand sign in the Southwest Conference came into being.

== Game results ==
TCU victories	Texas A&M victories	Tie games

No.	Date	Location	Winner	Score
1	November 13, 1897	College Station, TX	TCU	30–6
2	November 24, 1898	Waco, TX	Texas A&M	16–0
3	November 15, 1902	Waco, TX	Texas A&M	22–0
4	October 10, 1903	College Station, TX	Texas A&M	14–6
5	November 14, 1903	College Station, TX	Texas A&M	16–0
6	November 21, 1903	Waco, TX	Texas A&M	11–0
7	October 22, 1904	College Station, TX	Texas A&M	29–0
8	October 14, 1905	College Station, TX	Texas A&M	20–0
9	November 4, 1905	Waco, TX	Texas A&M	24–11
10	October 20, 1906	College Station, TX	Texas A&M	42–0
11	November 5, 1906	Waco, TX	Texas A&M	22–0
12	November 9, 1907	College Station, TX	Texas A&M	32–5
13	October 31, 1908	Waco, TX	Texas A&M	13–10
14	October 9, 1909	College Station, TX	Tie	0–0
15	October 15, 1910	College Station, TX	Texas A&M	35–0
16	November 1, 1910	Fort Worth, TX	Texas A&M	23–6
17	October 16, 1914	College Station, TX	Texas A&M	40–0
18	October 15, 1915	Fort Worth, TX	Texas A&M	13–10
19	November 15, 1919	Fort Worth, TX	Texas A&M	48–0
20	November 8, 1924	College Station, TX	Texas A&M	28–0
21	November 7, 1925	Fort Worth, TX	TCU	3–0
22	November 6, 1926	College Station, TX	Tie	13–13
23	October 22, 1927	Fort Worth, TX	Tie	0–0
24	October 20, 1928	College Station, TX	TCU	6–0
25	October 19, 1929	Fort Worth, TX	TCU	13–7
26	October 18, 1930	College Station, TX	TCU	3–0
27	October 17, 1931	Fort Worth, TX	TCU	6–0
28	October 15, 1932	College Station, TX	TCU	17–0
29	October 21, 1933	Fort Worth, TX	TCU	13–7
30	October 20, 1934	College Station, TX	TCU	13–0
31	October 19, 1935	Fort Worth, TX	TCU	19–14
32	October 17, 1936	College Station, TX	Texas A&M	18–7
33	October 16, 1937	Fort Worth, TX	Tie	7–7
34	October 15, 1938	College Station, TX	TCU	34–6
35	October 21, 1939	Fort Worth, TX	#5 Texas A&M	20–6
36	October 19, 1940	College Station, TX	#2 Texas A&M	21–7
37	October 18, 1941	Fort Worth, TX	#14 Texas A&M	14–0
38	October 17, 1942	College Station, TX	#17 TCU	7–2
39	October 16, 1943	Fort Worth, TX	#18 Texas A&M	13–0
40	October 21, 1944	College Station, TX	TCU	13–0
41	October 20, 1945	Fort Worth, TX	TCU	13–12
42	October 19, 1946	College Station, TX	Texas A&M	14–0
43	October 18, 1947	Fort Worth, TX	TCU	26–0
44	October 16, 1948	College Station, TX	TCU	27–14
45	October 15, 1949	Fort Worth, TX	TCU	28–6
46	October 21, 1950	College Station, TX	Texas A&M	42–23
47	October 20, 1951	Fort Worth, TX	TCU	20–14

No.	Date	Location	Winner	Score
48	October 18, 1952	College Station, TX	Tie	7–7
49	October 17, 1953	Fort Worth, TX	Texas A&M	20–7
50	October 16, 1954	College Station, TX	TCU	21–20
51	October 15, 1955	Fort Worth, TX	#19 Texas A&M	19–16
52	October 20, 1956	College Station, TX	#14 Texas A&M	7–6
53	October 19, 1957	Fort Worth, TX	#3 Texas A&M	7–0
54	October 18, 1958	College Station, TX	#20 TCU	24–8
55	October 17, 1959	Fort Worth, TX	TCU	39–6
56	October 15, 1960	College Station, TX	Tie	14–14
57	October 21, 1961	Fort Worth, TX	TCU	15–14
58	October 20, 1962	College Station, TX	TCU	20–14
59	October 19, 1963	Fort Worth, TX	Tie	14–14
60	October 17, 1964	College Station, TX	TCU	14–9
61	October 16, 1965	Fort Worth, TX	TCU	17–9
62	October 15, 1966	College Station, TX	Texas A&M	35–7
63	October 21, 1967	Fort Worth, TX	Texas A&M	20–0
64	October 19, 1968	College Station, TX	Texas A&M	27–7
65	October 18, 1969	Fort Worth, TX	TCU	16–6
66	October 17, 1970	College Station, TX	TCU	31–15
67	October 16, 1971	Fort Worth, TX	TCU	14–3
68	October 21, 1972	College Station, TX	TCU	13–10
69	October 20, 1973	Fort Worth, TX	Texas A&M	35–16
70	October 19, 1974	College Station, TX	#8 Texas A&M	17–0
71	October 18, 1975	Fort Worth, TX	#5 Texas A&M	14–6
72	November 20, 1976	College Station, TX	#11 Texas A&M	59–10
73	November 19, 1977	Fort Worth, TX	#14 Texas A&M	52–23
74	November 25, 1978	College Station, TX	Texas A&M	15–7
75	November 24, 1979	Fort Worth, TX	Texas A&M	30–7
76	November 22, 1980	College Station, TX	Texas A&M	13–10
77	November 21, 1981	Fort Worth, TX	Texas A&M	37–7
78	November 20, 1982	College Station, TX	Texas A&M	34–14
79	November 19, 1983	Fort Worth, TX	Texas A&M	20–10
80	November 24, 1984	College Station, TX	Texas A&M	35–21
81	November 23, 1985	Fort Worth, TX	#19 Texas A&M	53–6
82	November 22, 1986	College Station, TX	#13 Texas A&M	74–10
83	November 21, 1987	Fort Worth, TX	#16 Texas A&M	42–24
84	November 19, 1988	College Station, TX	Texas A&M	18–0
85	September 16, 1989	Fort Worth, TX	#22 Texas A&M	44–7
86	November 24, 1990	College Station, TX	Texas A&M	56–10
87	November 9, 1991	Fort Worth, TX	#12 Texas A&M	44–7
88	November 21, 1992	College Station, TX	#4 Texas A&M	37–10
89	November 20, 1993	Fort Worth, TX	#10 Texas A&M	59–3
90	November 19, 1994	College Station, TX	#9 Texas A&M	34–17
91	November 25, 1995	Fort Worth, TX	#15 Texas A&M	38–6
92	December 28, 2001	Houston, TX	Texas A&M	28–9
Series: Texas A&M leads 56–29–7

== See also ==
- List of NCAA college football rivalry games
