= 1989 Ohio State Buckeyes football team =

American college football season

1989 Ohio State Buckeyes football

Hall of Fame Bowl, L 31-14 vs. Auburn
- Conference: Big Ten Conference

Ranking
- AP: No. 24
- Record: 8–4 (6–2 Big Ten)
- Head coach: John Cooper (2nd season)
- Offensive coordinator: Jim Colletto (2nd season)
- Offensive scheme: Singleback
- Defensive coordinator: Bill Young (2nd season)
- Base defense: 3–4
- MVP: Derek Isaman
- Captains: David Brown; Jeff Davidson; Zack Dumas; Derek Isaman; Joe Staysniak
- Home stadium: Ohio Stadium

1989 Big Ten Conference football standings
| | Conf. | | | | | Overall |
| Team | W | | L | | T | W | | L | | T |
|---|---|---|---|---|---|---|---|---|---|---|
| No. 7 Michigan $ | 8 | – | 0 | – | 0 | 10 | – | 2 | – | 0 |
| No. 10 Illinois | 7 | – | 1 | – | 0 | 10 | – | 2 | – | 0 |
| No. 16 Michigan State | 6 | – | 2 | – | 0 | 8 | – | 4 | – | 0 |
| No. 24 Ohio State | 6 | – | 2 | – | 0 | 8 | – | 4 | – | 0 |
| Minnesota | 4 | – | 4 | – | 0 | 6 | – | 5 | – | 0 |
| Indiana | 3 | – | 5 | – | 0 | 5 | – | 6 | – | 0 |
| Iowa | 3 | – | 5 | – | 0 | 5 | – | 6 | – | 0 |
| Purdue | 2 | – | 6 | – | 0 | 3 | – | 8 | – | 0 |
| Wisconsin | 1 | – | 7 | – | 0 | 2 | – | 9 | – | 0 |
| Northwestern | 0 | – | 8 | – | 0 | 0 | – | 11 | – | 0 |
$ – Conference champion; Rankings from AP Poll

The 1989 Ohio State Buckeyes football team was an American football team that represented the Ohio State University as a member of the Big Ten Conference during the 1989 NCAA Division I-A football season. In their second year under head coach John Cooper, the Buckeyes compiled an 8–4 record (6–2 in conference games), tied for third place in the Big Ten, and outscored opponents by a total of 325 to 266. They were ranked No. 24 in the final AP poll.

Against Minnesota, the Buckeyes came back from a 31–0 deficit to win, 41–37. This tied the record for the largest comeback win in college football history at the time. It remains the biggest comeback win in Ohio State history.

The Buckeyes gained an average of 220.5 rushing yards and 162.3 passing yards per game. On defense, they held opponents to 172.3 rushing yards and 182.2 passing yards per game. The team's statistical leaders included quarterback Greg Frey (1,900 passing yards, 59.5% completion percentage), running back Carlos Snow (948 rushing yards, 5.4 yards per carry), and wide receiver Jeff Graham (27 receptions for 505 yards). Offensive tackle Joe Staysniak and guard Jeff Davidson received first-team honors on the 1989 All-Big Ten Conference football team.

The team played its home games at Ohio Stadium in Columbus, Ohio.

== Schedule ==
| Date | Time | Opponent | Rank | Site | TV | Result | Attendance | Source |
|---|---|---|---|---|---|---|---|---|
| September 16 | 1:30 p.m. | Oklahoma State* | | Ohio Stadium; Columbus, OH | | W 37–13 | 88,670 | |
| September 23 | 3:30 p.m. | at No. 12 USC* | No. 25 | Los Angeles Memorial Coliseum; Los Angeles, CA | ABC | L 3–42 | 69,876 | |
| September 30 | 1:30 p.m. | Boston College* | | Ohio Stadium; Columbus, OH | | W 34–29 | 88,936 | |
| October 7 | 3:30 p.m. | at No. 18 Illinois | | Memorial Stadium; Champaign, IL (Illibuck) | ABC | L 14–34 | 69,088 | |
| October 14 | 1:30 p.m. | Indiana | | Ohio Stadium; Columbus, OH | | W 35–31 | 89,750 | |
| October 21 | 1:30 p.m. | Purdue | | Ohio Stadium; Columbus, OH | | W 21–3 | 89,091 | |
| October 28 | 3:30 p.m. | at Minnesota | | Hubert H. Humphrey Metrodome; Minneapolis, MN | ABC | W 41–37 | 33,945 | |
| November 4 | 2:00 p.m. | at Northwestern | | Dyche Stadium; Evanston, IL | | W 52–27 | 28,238 | |
| November 11 | 12:30 p.m. | Iowa | | Ohio Stadium; Columbus, OH | ESPN | W 28–0 | 89,536 | |
| November 18 | 1:30 p.m. | Wisconsin | No. 22 | Ohio Stadium; Columbus, OH | | W 42–22 | 89,626 | |
| November 25 | 12:00 p.m. | at No. 3 Michigan | No. 20 | Michigan Stadium; Ann Arbor, MI (rivalry) | ABC | L 18–28 | 106,137 | |
| January 1, 1990 | 12:00 p.m. | vs. No. 9 Auburn* | No. 21 | Tampa Stadium; Tampa, FL (Hall of Fame Bowl) | NBC | L 14–31 | 52,235 | |
*Non-conference game; Rankings from AP Poll released prior to the game; All times are in Eastern time

== Game summaries ==
=== Oklahoma State ===
Oklahoma State Cowboys (0–1) at Ohio State Buckeyes (0–0)

| Quarter | 1 | 2 | 3 | 4 | Total |
|---|---|---|---|---|---|
| Oklahoma St | 7 | 6 | 0 | 0 | 13 |
| Ohio St | 6 | 10 | 14 | 7 | 37 |

at Ohio Stadium, Columbus, Ohio

- Date: September 16
- Game time: 1:30 p.m.
- Game weather: Overcast, 66 °F (19 °C)
- Game attendance: 88,670
- Referee: John Nealon

Game information

First quarter

- OHST – Carlos Snow 20-yard run (pass failed), 9:51. Ohio St 6–0. Drive: 4 plays, 39 yards, 0:54.
- OKST – Curtis Mayfield 21-yard pass from Mike Gundy (Cary Blanchard kick), 4:57. Oklahoma St 7–6. Drive: 3 plays, 26 yards, 1:02.

Second quarter

- OKST – Cary Blanchard 20-yard field goal, 12:00. Oklahoma St 10–6. Drive: 11 plays, 50 yards, 5:16.
- OHST – Pat O'Morrow 46-yard field goal, 7:32. Oklahoma St 10–9. Drive: 10 plays, 54 yards, 4:23.
- OKST – Cary Blanchard 33-yard field goal, 0:32. Oklahoma St 13–9. Drive: 15 plays, 63 yards, 7:00.
- OHST – Carlos Snow 2-yard run (Pat O'Morrow kick), 0:07. Ohio St 16–13. Drive: 2 plays, 59 yards, 0:20.

Third quarter

- OHST – Bernard Edwards 33-yard pass from Greg Frey (Pat O'Morrow kick), 9:17. Ohio St 23–13. Drive: 6 plays, 80 yards, 1:34.
- OHST – Scottie Graham 1-yard run (Pat O'Morrow kick), 1:47. Ohio St 30–13. Drive: 9 plays, 73 yards, 4:55.

Fourth quarter

- OHST – Bobby Olive 27-yard pass from Greg Frey (Pat O'Morrow kick), 10:21. Ohio St 37–13. Drive: 7 plays, 55 yards, 3:13.

Top passers

- OKST – Mike Gundy – 6/14, 55 yards, TD, 2 INT
- OHST – Greg Frey – 16/21, 205 yards, 2 TD, INT

Top rushers

- OKST – Gerald Hudson – 29 rushes, 146 yards
- OHST – Carlos Snow – 12 rushes, 67 yards, 2 TD

Top receivers

- OKST – Curtis Mayfield – 4 receptions, 44 yards, TD
- OHST – Bobby Olive – 5 receptions, 108 yards, TD

=== At USC ===
#25 Ohio State Buckeyes (1–0) at #12 USC Trojans (1–1)

| Quarter | 1 | 2 | 3 | 4 | Total |
|---|---|---|---|---|---|
| Ohio St | 3 | 0 | 0 | 0 | 3 |
| USC | 0 | 21 | 14 | 7 | 42 |

at Los Angeles Memorial Coliseum, Los Angeles, California

- Date: September 23
- Game time: 12:30 p.m. PST
- Game weather: Sunny, 74 °F (23 °C)
- Game attendance: 69,876
- Referee: Pat Flood

Game information

First quarter

- OSU – Pat O'Morrow 45-yard field goal, 4:18. Ohio St 3–0. Drive: 11 plays, 49 yards, 5:20.

Second quarter

- USC – Scott Galbraith 3-yard pass from Shane Foley (Quin Rodriguez kick), 11:20. USC 7–3. Drive: 13 plays, 80 yards, 5:12.
- USC – John Jackson 87-yard pass from Todd Marinovich (Quin Rodriguez kick), 8:21. USC 14–3. Drive: 3 plays, 95 yards, 1:36.
- USC – Scott Galbraith 11-yard pass from Todd Marinovich (Quin Rodriguez kick), 7:31. USC 21–3. Drive: 1 play, 11 yards, 0:08.

Third quarter

- USC – Gary Wellman 19-yard pass from Todd Marinovich (Quin Rodriguez kick), 3:16. USC 28–3. Drive: 8 plays, 88 yards, 3:46.
- USC – Gary Wellman 17-yard pass from Todd Marinovich (Quin Rodriguez kick), 0:04. USC 35–3. Drive: 6 plays, 35 yards, 2:41.

Fourth quarter

- USC – Mazio Royster 1-yard run (Quin Rodriguez kick), 1:38. USC 42–3. Drive: 9 plays, 46 yards, 3:57.

Top passers

- OSU – Greg Frey – 13/28, 135 yards, INT
- USC – Todd Marinovich – 14/22, 246 yards, 4 TD, INT

Top rushers

- OSU – Carlos Snow – 11 rushes, 83 yards
- USC – Ricky Ervins – 21 rushes, 117 yards

Top receivers

- OSU – Jeff Graham – 3 receptions, 43 yards
- USC – John Jackson – 2 receptions, 108 yards, TD

=== Boston College ===
Boston College Eagles (0–3) at Ohio State Buckeyes (1–1)

| Quarter | 1 | 2 | 3 | 4 | Total |
|---|---|---|---|---|---|
| Boston College | 0 | 7 | 16 | 6 | 29 |
| Ohio St | 10 | 21 | 3 | 0 | 34 |

at Ohio Stadium, Columbus, Ohio

- Date: September 30
- Game time: 1:30 p.m.
- Game weather: Sunny, 70 °F (21 °C)
- Game attendance: 88,936
- Referee: Jerry Hendrickson

Game information

First quarter

- OSU – Jeff Graham 80-yard pass from Greg Frey (Pat O'Morrow kick), 13:12. Ohio St 7–0. Drive: 1 play, 80 yards, 0:12.
- OSU – Pat O'Morrow 29-yard field goal, 0:49. Ohio St 10–0. Drive: 8 plays, 37 yards, 3:31.

Second quarter

- OSU – Carlos Snow 24-yard run (Pat O'Morrow kick), 10:51. Ohio St 17–0. Drive: 9 plays, 72 yards, 3:26.
- OSU – Carlos Snow 16-yard run (Pat O'Morrow kick), 2:09. Ohio St 24–0. Drive: 10 plays, 78 yards, 3:59.
- BC – Marcus Cherry 41-yard pass from Mark Kamphaus (Brian Lowe kick), 1:38. Ohio St 24–7. Drive: 2 plays, 60 yards, 0:24.
- OSU – Scottie Graham 70-yard run (Pat O'Morrow kick), 1:09. Ohio St 31–7. Drive: 3 plays, 75 yards, 0:23.

Third quarter

- BC – Mark Chmura 2-yard pass from Willie Hicks (run good), 10:51. Ohio St 31–15. Drive: 5 plays, 69 yards, 2:00.
- BC – Tim Frager 28-yard run (pass good), 5:49. Ohio St 31–23, Drive: 6 plays, 69 yards, 2:48.
- OSU – Pat O'Morrow 35-yard field goal, 1:33. Ohio St 34–23. Drive: 9 plays, 53 yards, 4:14.

Fourth quarter

- BC – Ed Toner 1-yard run (pass failed), 5:33. Ohio St 34–29. Drive: 5 plays, 68 yards, 1:58.

Top passers

- BC – Willie Hicks – 9/12, 184 yards, TD
- OSU – Greg Frey – 15/26, 252 yards, TD

Top rushers

- BC – Mike Sanders – 12 rushes, 63 yards
- OSU – Scottie Graham – 19 rushes, 151 yards, TD

Top receivers

- BC – Marcus Cherry – 4 receptions, 161 yards, TD
- OSU – Jeff Graham – 2 receptions, 101 yards, TD

- Carlos Snow 23 rushes, 147 yards

=== At Illinois ===
Ohio State Buckeyes (2–1) at #18 Illinois Fighting Illini (2–1)

| Quarter | 1 | 2 | 3 | 4 | Total |
|---|---|---|---|---|---|
| Ohio St | 0 | 7 | 7 | 0 | 14 |
| Illinois | 7 | 3 | 14 | 10 | 34 |

at Memorial Stadium, Champaign, Illinois

- Date: October 7
- Game time: 2:30 p.m. CST
- Game weather: Sunny, 54 °F (12 °C)
- Game attendance: 69,088
- Referee: Gil Marchman
- TV: ABC

Game information

First quarter

- ILL – Howard Griffith 1-yard run (Doug Higgins kick), 1:01. Illinois 7–0. Drive: 5 plays, 45 yards, 1:59.

Second quarter

- OSU – Carlos Snow 7-yard run (Pat O'Morrow kick), 13:31. Tie 7–7. Drive: 7 plays, 66 yards, 2:30.
- ILL – Doug Higgins 26-yard field goal, 9:07. Illinois 10–7. Drive: 11 plays, 49 yards, 4:24.

Third quarter

- ILL – Howard Griffith 5-yard run (Chris Siambekos kick), 8:57. Illinois 17–7. Drive: 8 plays, 56 yards, 3:49.
- OSU – Jeff Graham 66-yard punt return (Pat O'Morrow kick), 4:22. Illinois 17–14.
- ILL – Mike Bellamy 34-yard pass from Steve Williams (Chris Siambekos kick), 3:30. Illinois 24–14. Drive: 3 plays, 60 yards, 0:52.

Fourth quarter

- ILL – Chris Siambekos 36-yard field goal, 14:49. Illinois 27–14. Drive: 7 plays, 11 yards, 2:26.
- ILL – Ken Thomas 36-yard run (Chris Siambekos kick), 3:27. Illinois 34–14. Drive: 10 plays, 99 yards, 4:17.

Top passers

- OSU – Greg Frey – 13/25, 137 yards, INT
- ILL – Jeff George – 12/20, 130 yards, 2 INT

Top rushers

- OSU – Carlos Snow – 21 rushes, 97 yards, TD
- ILL – Howard Griffith – 20 rushes, 117 yards, 2 TD

Top receivers

- OSU – Jeff Graham – 5 receptions, 71 yards
- ILL – Mike Bellamy – 10 receptions, 152 yards, TD

=== Indiana ===
Indiana Hoosiers (3–1) at Ohio State Buckeyes (2–2)

| Quarter | 1 | 2 | 3 | 4 | Total |
|---|---|---|---|---|---|
| Indiana | 0 | 14 | 7 | 10 | 31 |
| Ohio St | 7 | 21 | 7 | 0 | 35 |

at Ohio Stadium, Columbus, Ohio

- Date: October 14
- Game time: 1:30 p.m.
- Game weather: Sunny, 75 °F (24 °C)
- Game attendance: 89,750
- Referee: John Nealon

Game information

First quarter

- OSU – Jim Palmer 2-yard pass from Greg Frey (Pat O'Morrow kick), 8:47. Ohio St 7–0. Drive: 10 plays, 45 yards, 5:01.

Second quarter

- IU – Anthony Thompson 9-yard run (Scott Bonnell kick), 11:04. Tie 7–7. Drive: 12 plays, 88 yards, 6:15.
- OSU – Scottie Graham 60-yard run (Pat O'Morrow kick), 9:21. Ohio St 14–7. Drive: 4 plays, 80 yards, 1:43.
- OSU – Carlos Snow 10-yard run (Pat O'Morrow kick), 5:15. Ohio St 21–7. Drive: 2 plays, 16 yards, 0:42.
- OSU – Jim Palmer 4-yard pass from Greg Frey (Pat O'Morrow kick), 3:45. Ohio St 28–7. Drive: 4 plays, 28 yards, 1:29.
- IU – Terry Saunders 2-yard pass from Dave Schnell (Scott Bonnell kick), 0:19. Ohio St 28–14. Drive: 9 plays, 73 yards, 3:26.

Third quarter

- OSU – Scottie Graham 1-yard run (Pat O'Morrow kick), 10:00. Ohio St 35–14. Drive: 11 plays, 80 yards, 5:00.
- IU – Anthony Thompson 2-yard run (Scott Bonnell kick), 4:17. Ohio St 35–21. Drive: 11 plays, 68 yards, 5:40.

Fourth quarter

- IU – Anthony Thompson 6-yard run (run good), 3:25. Ohio St 35–29. Drive: 10 plays, 90 yards, 3:29.
- IU – Safety, Greg Frey ran out of end zone, 1:38. Ohio St 35–31.

Top passers

- IU – Dave Schnell – 22/30, 247 yards, TD, 3 INT
- OSU – Greg Frey – 5/6, 37 yards, 2 TD

Top rushers

- IU – Anthony Thompson – 34 rushes, 177 yards, 3 TD
- OSU – Carlos Snow – 27 rushes, 143 yards, TD

Top receivers

- IU – Eddie Thomas – 7 receptions, 82 yards
- OSU – Bernard Edwards – 2 receptions, 21 yards

- Scottie Graham 16 rushes, 124 yards

=== Purdue ===
Purdue Boilermakers (1–4) at Ohio State Buckeyes (3–2)

| Quarter | 1 | 2 | 3 | 4 | Total |
|---|---|---|---|---|---|
| Purdue | 0 | 0 | 3 | 0 | 3 |
| Ohio St | 14 | 0 | 7 | 0 | 21 |

at Ohio Stadium, Columbus, Ohio

- Date: October 21
- Game time: 1:30 p.m.
- Game weather: Overcast, 44 °F (7 °C)
- Game attendance: 89,091
- Referee: Jim Kemerling

Game information

First quarter

- OSU – Greg Frey 4-yard run (Pat O'Morrow kick), 11:40. Ohio St 7–0. Drive: 3 plays, 26 yards, 0:53.
- OSU – Carlos Snow 1-yard run (Pat O'Morrow kick), 3:59. Ohio St 14–0. Drive: 10 plays, 62 yards, 4:43.

Second quarter

- No scoring

Third quarter

- OSU – Carlos Snow 3-yard run (Pat O'Morrow kick), 9:50. Ohio St 21–0. Drive: 5 plays, 44 yards, 0:59.
- PUR – Larry Sullivan 25-yard field goal, 5:35. Ohio St 21–3. Drive: 7 plays, 73 yards, 4:15.

Fourth quarter

- No scoring

Top passers

- PUR – Eric Hunter – 6/16, 147 yards
- OSU – Greg Frey – 3/9, 47 yards

Top rushers

- PUR – Jerome Sparkman – 18 rushes, 85 yards
- OSU – Carlos Snow – 18 rushes, 149 yards, 2 TD

Top receivers

- PUR – Jerome Sparkman – 6 receptions, 86 yards
- OSU – Jeff Graham – 2 receptions, 37 yards

=== At Minnesota ===
Ohio State Buckeyes (4–2) at Minnesota Golden Gophers (4–2)

| Quarter | 1 | 2 | 3 | 4 | Total |
|---|---|---|---|---|---|
| Ohio St | 0 | 8 | 10 | 23 | 41 |
| Minnesota | 17 | 14 | 0 | 6 | 37 |

at Hubert H. Humphrey Metrodome, Minneapolis, Minnesota

- Date: October 28
- Game time: 2:30 p.m.
- Game weather: Indoors (dome)
- Game attendance: 33,945
- Referee: Jerry Hendrickson

Game information

First quarter

- MINN – Darrell Thompson 12-yard run (Brent Berglund kick), 12:11. Minnesota 7–0. Drive: 4 plays, 28 yards, 1:18.
- MINN – Brent Berglund 30-yard field goal, 4:17. Minnesota 10–0. Drive: 6 plays, 9 yards, 3:00.
- MINN – Sean Lumpkin 85-yard fumble return (Brent Berglund kick), 3:07. Minnesota 17–0.

Second quarter

- MINN – Steve Rhem 29-yard pass from Scott Schaffner (Brent Berglund kick), 9:50. Minnesota 24–0. Drive: 4 plays, 73 yards, 1:40.
- MINN – Chris Gaiters 5-yard pass from Scott Schaffner (Brent Berglund kick), 4:29. Minnesota 31–0. Drive: 9 plays, 44 yards, 3:36.
- OSU – Carlos Snow 1-yard run (pass good), 0:10. Minnesota 31–8. Drive: 10 plays, 80 yards, 4:19.

Third quarter

- OSU – Pat O'Morrow 25-yard field goal, 10:04. Minnesota 31–11. Drive: 11 plays, 66 yards, 4:56.
- OSU – Carlos Snow 15-yard pass from Greg Frey (Pat O'Morrow kick), 0:20. Minnesota 31–18. Drive: 11 plays, 98 yards, 4:52.

Fourth quarter

- MINN – Brent Berglund 32-yard field goal, 11:24. Minnesota 34–18. Drive: 9 plays, 37 yards, 3:56.
- OSU – Carlos Snow 27-yard pass from Greg Frey (pass good), 9:51. Minnesota 34–26. Drive: 4 plays, 46 yards, 1:33.
- MINN – Brent Berglund 42-yard field goal, 5:15. Minnesota 37–26. Drive: 4 plays, 4 yards, 2:10.
- OSU – Greg Frey 1-yard run (pass good), 3:04. Minnesota 37–34. Drive: 8 plays, 68 yards, 2:11.
- OSU – Jeff Graham 15-yard pass from Greg Frey (Pat O'Morrow kick), 0:51. Ohio St 41–37. Drive: 5 plays, 73 yards, 1:01.

Top passers

- OSU – Greg Frey – 20/31, 362 yards, 3 TD, INT
- MINN – Scott Schaffner – 13/18, 154 yards, 2 TD

Top rushers

- OSU – Carlos Snow – 23 rushes, 74 yards, TD
- MINN – Darrell Thompson – 29 rushes, 133 yards, TD

Top receivers

- OSU – Jeff Graham – 6 receptions, 104 yards, TD
- MINN – Steve Rhem – 3 receptions, 43 yards, TD

=== At Northwestern ===
Ohio State Buckeyes (5–2) at Northwestern Wildcats (0–7)

| Quarter | 1 | 2 | 3 | 4 | Total |
|---|---|---|---|---|---|
| Ohio St | 7 | 21 | 7 | 17 | 52 |
| Northwestern | 7 | 0 | 6 | 14 | 27 |

at Dyche Stadium, Evanston, Illinois

- Date: November 4
- Game time: 1:00 p.m.
- Game weather: Overcast, 45 °F (7 °C)
- Game attendance: 28,236
- Referee: John Nealon
- TV announcers (WOSU-TV): Jack Kramer and Paul Warfield

Game information

First quarter

- OSU – Carlos Snow 25-yard run (Pat O'Morrow kick), 9:04. Ohio St 7–0. Drive: 13 plays, 85 yards, 5:56.
- NW – Tim O'Brien 11-yard run (Ira Adler kick), 4:52. Tie 7–7. Drive: 9 plays, 61 yards, 4:12.

Second quarter

- OSU – Scottie Graham 20-yard run (Pat O'Morrow kick), 5:05. Ohio St 14–7. Drive: 11 plays, 75 yards, 4:16.
- OSU – James Bryant 63-yard run (Pat O'Morrow kick), 2:04. Ohio St 21–7. Drive: 2 plays, 77 yards, 0:17.
- OSU – James Bryant 46-yard pass from Greg Frey (Pat O'Morrow kick), 0:59. Ohio St 28–7. Drive: 2 plays, 46 yards, 0:16.

Third quarter

- OSU – Dante Lee 5-yard run (Pat O'Morrow kick), 5:20. Ohio St 35–7. Drive: 16 plays, 80 yards, 9:40.
- NW – Bob Christian 3-yard run (run failed), 2:46. Ohio St 35–13. Drive: 9 plays, 51 yards, 2:34.

Fourth quarter

- OSU – Pat O'Morrow 19-yard field goal, 14:13. Ohio St 38–13. Drive: 9 plays, 80 yards, 3:33.
- OSU – Dante Lee 8-yard run (Pat O'Morrow kick), 10:49. Ohio St 45–13. Drive: 4 plays, 29 yards, 1:48.
- NW – Richard Buchanan 14-yard pass from Tim O'Brien (pass failed), 8:14. Ohio St 45–20. Drive: 9 plays, 78 yards, 2:35.
- OSU – Dante Lee 6-yard run (Pat O'Morrow kick), 1:15. Ohio St 52–20. Drive: 13 plays, 80 yards, 6:59.
- NW – Mark Benson 21-yard pass from Kevin Krebs (run good), 0:00. Ohio St 52–28. Drive: 8 plays, 73 yards, 1:15.

Top passers

- OSU – Greg Frey – 8/10, 106 yards, TD
- NW – Tim O'Brien – 15/21, 172 yards, TD, INT

Top rushers

- OSU – Dante Lee – 24 rushes, 157 yards, 3 TD
- NW – Bob Christian – 27 rushes, 144 yards, TD

Top receivers

- OSU – James Bryant – 1 reception, 46 yards, TD
- NW – Richard Buchanan – 8 receptions, 101 yards, TD

- Scottie Graham 17 Rush, 102 Yds
- Carlos Snow 17 Rush, 100 Yds

Ohio State versus Northwestern on YouTube

=== Iowa ===
Iowa Hawkeyes (4–4) at Ohio State Buckeyes (6–2)

| Quarter | 1 | 2 | 3 | 4 | Total |
|---|---|---|---|---|---|
| Iowa | 0 | 0 | 0 | 0 | 0 |
| Ohio St | 7 | 7 | 7 | 7 | 28 |

at Ohio Stadium, Columbus, Ohio

- Date: November 11
- Game time: 12:30 p.m. CDT
- Game weather: Overcast, 52 °F (11 °C)
- Game attendance: 89,536
- Referee: Jerry Hendrickson

Game information

First quarter

- OSU – Scottie Graham 3-yard run (Pat O'Morrow kick), 7:18. Ohio St 7–0. Drive: 9 plays, 40 yards, 3:54.

Second quarter

- OSU – Jeff Graham 8-yard pass from Greg Frey (Pat O'Morrow kick), 12:24. Ohio St 14–0. Drive: 15 plays, 80 yards, 5:44.

Third quarter

- OSU – Scottie Graham 9-yard pass from Greg Frey (Pat O'Morrow kick), 6:35. Ohio St 21–0. Drive: 6 plays, 87 yards, 2:14.

Fourth quarter

- OSU – Dante Lee 1-yard run (Pat O'Morrow kick), 10:51. Ohio St 28–0. Drive: 13 plays, 79 yards, 7:42.

Top passers

- IOWA – Matt Rodgers – 15/33, 201 yards
- OSU – Greg Frey – 11/19, 168 yards, 2 TD, INT

Top rushers

- IOWA – Richard Bass – 6 rushes, 30 yards
- OSU – Dante Lee – 13 rushes, 99 yards, TD

Top receivers

- IOWA – Travis Watkins – 4 receptions, 69 yards
- OSU – Jeff Graham – 3 receptions, 70 yards, TD

=== Wisconsin ===
Wisconsin Badgers (2–7) at #22 Ohio State Buckeyes (7–2)

| Quarter | 1 | 2 | 3 | 4 | Total |
|---|---|---|---|---|---|
| Wisconsin | 3 | 10 | 3 | 6 | 22 |
| Ohio St | 7 | 21 | 14 | 0 | 42 |

at Ohio Stadium, Columbus, Ohio

- Date: November 10
- Game time: 1:30 p.m.
- Game weather: Partly cloudy, 28 °F (−2 °C)
- Game attendance: 89,626
- Referee: Jim Kemmerling

Game information

First quarter

- WIS – Rich Thompson 40-yard field goal, 12:06. Wisconsin 3–0. Drive: 7 plays, 16 yards, 2:45.
- OSU – Dante Lee 1-yard run (Pat O'Morrow kick), 5:00. Ohio St 7–3. Drive: 15 plays, 66 yards, 7:01.

Second quarter

- WIS – Rich Thompson 36-yard field goal, 10:35. Ohio St 7–6. Drive: 12 plays, 66 yards, 6:04.
- WIS – Troy Vincent 71-yard punt return (Rich Thompson kick), 8:35. Wisconsin 13–7.
- OSU – Jim Palmer 9-yard pass from Greg Frey (Pat O'Morrow kick), 6:25. Ohio St 14–13. Drive: 6 plays, 66 yards, 2:05.
- OSU – Dante Lee 18-yard run (Pat O'Morrow kick), 1:24. Ohio St 21–13. Drive: 8 plays, 75 yards, 3:00.
- OSU – David Brown 43-yard interception return (Pat O'Morrow kick), 1:07. Ohio St 28–13.

Third quarter

- OSU – Scottie Graham 16-yard run (Pat O'Morrow kick), 12:13. Ohio St 35–13. Drive: 6 plays, 61 yards, 2:38.
- WIS – Rich Thompson 35-yard field goal, 9:34. Ohio St 35–18. Drive: 7 plays, 46 yards, 2:33.
- OSU – Scottie Graham 1-yard run (Pat O'Morrow kick), 3:10. Ohio St 42–18. Drive: 12 plays, 62 yards, 6:16.

Fourth quarter

- WIS – Craig Hudson 5-yard run (run failed), 8:26. Ohio St 42–24. Drive: 8 plays, 30 yards, 3:54.

Top passers

- WIS – Lionell Crawford – 0/8, 0 yards, INT
- OSU – Greg Frey – 10/15, 151 yards, TD

Top rushers

- WIS – Lionell Crawford – 16 rushes, 104 yards
- OSU – Scottie Graham – 23 rushes, 152 yards, 2 TD

Top receivers

- WIS – None
- OSU – Bobby Olive – 3 receptions, 44 yards

=== At Michigan ===
#20 Ohio State Buckeyes (8–2) at #3 Michigan Wolverines (9–1)

| Quarter | 1 | 2 | 3 | 4 | Total |
|---|---|---|---|---|---|
| Ohio St | 0 | 3 | 9 | 6 | 18 |
| Michigan | 7 | 7 | 0 | 14 | 28 |

at Michigan Stadium, Ann Arbor, Michigan

- Date: November 25
- Game weather: Partly sunny, 46 °F (8 °C)
- Game attendance: 106,137
- TV: ABC

Game information

First quarter

- MICH – Leroy Hoard 1-yard run (J.D. Carlson kick), 3:13. Michigan 7–0. Drive: 9 plays, 47 yards, 3:04.

Second quarter

- MICH – Allen Jefferson 2-yard run (J.D. Carlson kick), 2:23. Michigan 14–0. Drive: 13 plays, 81 yards, 6:28.
- OSU – Pat O'Morrow 20-yard field goal, 0:25. Michigan 14–3. Drive: 7 plays, 65 yards, 1:58.

Third quarter

- OSU – Pat O'Morrow 22-yard field goal, 10:45. Michigan 14–6. Drive: 8 plays, 49 yards, 2:24.
- OSU – Scottie Graham 3-yard run (run failed), 4:03. Michigan 14–12. Drive: 9 plays, 40 yards, 5:11.

Fourth quarter

- MICH – Jarrod Bunch 5-yard pass from Michael Taylor (J.D. Carlson kick), 12:22. Michigan 21–12. Drive: 6 plays, 53 yards, 2:32.
- OSU – Scottie Graham 4-yard run (kick blocked), 7:04. Michigan 21–18. Drive: 11 plays, 80 yards, 5:18.
- MICH – Jarrod Bunch 23-yard run (J.D. Carlson kick), 1:20. Michigan 28–18. Drive: 7 plays, 59 yards, 1:28.

Top passers

- OSU – Greg Frey – 14/25, 220 yards, 2 INT
- MICH – Michael Taylor – 8/16, 100 yards, TD

Top rushers

- OSU – Scottie Graham – 28 rushes, 133 yards, 2 TD
- MICH – Leroy Hoard – 21 rushes, 152 yards, TD

Top receivers

- OSU – Jim Palmer – 5 receptions, 61 yards
- MICH – Greg McMurtry – 3 receptions, 39 yards

=== Hall of Fame Bowl (vs Auburn) ===
Hall of Fame Bowl: #9 Auburn Tigers (9–2) vs. #21 Ohio State Buckeyes (8–3)

| Quarter | 1 | 2 | 3 | 4 | Total |
|---|---|---|---|---|---|
| Ohio St | 7 | 7 | 0 | 0 | 14 |
| Auburn | 3 | 7 | 7 | 14 | 31 |

at Tampa Stadium, Tampa, Florida

- Date: January 1, 1990
- Game time: 1:00 p.m. EDT
- Game weather: Partly cloudy, 64 °F (18 °C)
- Game attendance: 52,535
- Referee: Bill McDonald
- TV announcers (NBC): Don Criqui

Game information

First quarter

- OSU – Carlos Snow 1-yard run (Pat O'Morrow kick), 6:50. Ohio St 7–0. Drive: 5 plays, 80 yards, 1:40.
- AUB – Win Lyle 19-yard field goal, 2:14. Ohio St 7–3. Drive: 10 plays, 38 yards, 4:36.

Second quarter

- OSU Brian Stablein 9-yard pass from Greg Frey (Pat O'Morrow kick), 13:36. Ohio St 14–3. Drive: 10 plays, 81 yards, 3:38.
- AUB – Greg Taylor 11-yard pass from Reggie Slack (Win Lyle kick), 0:11. Ohio St 14–10. Drive: 3 plays, 33 yards 0:37.

Third quarter

- AUB – Greg Taylor 4-yard pass from Reggie Slack (Win Lyle kick), 9:50. Auburn 17–14. Drive: 9 plays, 49 yards, 3:58.

Fourth quarter

- AUB – Reggie Slack 5-yard run (Win Lyle kick), 9:22. Auburn 24–14. Drive: 16 plays, 80 yards, 3:33.
- AUB – Herbert Casey 2-yard pass from Reggie Slack (Win Lyle kick), 7:20. Auburn 31–14. Drive: 3 plays, 32 yards, 0:57.

Top passers

- OSU – Greg Frey – 16/31, 232 yards, TD, INT
- AUB – Reggie Slack – 16/22, 141 yards, 3 TD, 2 INT

Top rushers

- OSU – Scottie Graham – 12 rushes, 53 yards
- AUB – Stacy Danley – 20 rushes, 85 yards

Top receivers

- OSU – Jeff Graham – 5 receptions, 105 yards
- AUB – Alexander Wright – 4 receptions, 59 yards

== Roster ==
1989 Ohio State Buckeyes football team roster
Players
Coaches
Offense

| Pos. | # | Name | Class |
|---|---|---|---|
| OL | | Dan Beatty |
| WR | | Greg Beatty |
| WR | | David Menges |
| RB | | James Bryant |
| OL | | Karl Coles |
| OL | | Jeff Davidson |
| WR | | Allen DeGraffenreid |
| WR | | Bernard Edwards |
| TE | | Jeff Ellis |
| QB | | Greg Frey |
| WR | | Jeff Graham |
| RB | | Scottie Graham |
| RB | | Tyrone Harrison |
| QB | | Kirk Herbstreit |
| WR | | Rich Huffman |
| RB | | Dante Lee |
| OL | | Tim Moxley |
| WR | | Bobby Olive |
| TE | | Jim Palmer |
| RB | | Carlos Snow |
| WR | | Brian Stablein |
| OL | | Joe Staysniak |

Defense

| Pos. | # | Name | Class |
|---|---|---|---|
| DB | | David Brown |
| DB | | Vinnie Clark |
| DB | | Bryan Cook |
| DB | | Zack Dumas |
| DL | | Rich Frimel |
| LB | | Judah Herman |
| LB | | Derek Isaman |
| DB | | Foster Paulk |
| DB | | Mark Pelini |
| DL | | Mike Showalter |
| DL | | Alonzo Spellman |
| DL | | Pat Thomas |
| LB | | Steve Tovar |
| LB | | Sreckin Zizakovic |

Special teams

| Pos. | # | Name | Class |
|---|---|---|---|
| P | | Jeff Bohlman |
| K | | Pat O'Morrow |

Head coach

- John Cooper
  (2nd Year)

Coordinators/assistant coaches

- Jim Colletto
  Assistant Head Coach/Offensive Coordinator, Tackles and Tight Ends (2nd Year)
- Bill Young
  Defensive Coordinator (2nd Year)
- Gary Blackney
  Inside Linebackers (6th Year)
- Ron Hudson
  Quarterbacks (2nd Year)
- Gene Huey
  Wide Receivers (2nd Year)
- Steve Pederson
  Recruiting Coordinator (2nd Year)
- Fred Pagac
  Outside Linebackers (8th Year)
- Bob Palcic
  Centers, Guards (4th Year)
- Bobby Turner
  Running Backs (1st Year)
- Dave Kennedy
  Strength and Conditioning Coach (1st Year)
- Ron Zook
  Defensive Backs (2nd Year)

Legend

- (C) Team captain
- (S) Suspended
- (I) Ineligible
- Injured
- Redshirt

Roster
Last update: 2016-Dec-02

== NFL draft picks ==
| Rnd. | Pick | Team | Player | Pos. | College | Notes |
|---|---|---|---|---|---|---|
| 5 | 111 | Denver Broncos | Jeff Davidson | G | | |
| 7 | 185 | San Diego Chargers | Joe Staysniak | G | | |
| 9 | 243 | Washington Redskins | Tim Moxley | G | | |
