= 1989 Purdue Boilermakers football team =

American college football season

1989 Purdue Boilermakers football
- Conference: Big Ten Conference
- Record: 3–8 (2–6 Big Ten)
- Head coach: Fred Akers (3rd season)
- Offensive coordinator: Bob Stanley (3rd season)
- Defensive coordinator: Phil Bennett (3rd season)
- MVP: Calvin Williams
- Captains: Dennis Dotson; Bill Hitchcock; Calvin Williams
- Home stadium: Ross–Ade Stadium

1989 Big Ten Conference football standings
	Conf.					Overall
Team	W		L		T	W		L		T
No. 7 Michigan $	8	–	0	–	0	10	–	2	–	0
No. 10 Illinois	7	–	1	–	0	10	–	2	–	0
No. 16 Michigan State	6	–	2	–	0	8	–	4	–	0
No. 24 Ohio State	6	–	2	–	0	8	–	4	–	0
Minnesota	4	–	4	–	0	6	–	5	–	0
Indiana	3	–	5	–	0	5	–	6	–	0
Iowa	3	–	5	–	0	5	–	6	–	0
Purdue	2	–	6	–	0	3	–	8	–	0
Wisconsin	1	–	7	–	0	2	–	9	–	0
Northwestern	0	–	8	–	0	0	–	11	–	0
$ – Conference champion; Rankings from AP Poll

The 1989 Purdue Boilermakers football team represented Purdue University as a member of the Big Ten Conference during the 1989 NCAA Division I-A football season. Led by third-year head coach Fred Akers, the Boilermakers compiled an overall record of 3–8 with a mark of 2–6 in conference play, placing eighth in the Big Ten. It was Purdue's fifth straight losing season. The team played home games at Ross–Ade Stadium in West Lafayette, Indiana.

== Schedule ==
Date	Opponent	Site	TV	Result	Attendance	Source
September 9	Miami (OH)*	Ross–Ade Stadium; West Lafayette, IN		W 27–10	38,840	
September 16	at No. 15 Washington*	Husky Stadium; Seattle, WA		L 9–38	66,392	
September 30	No. 1 Notre Dame*	Ross–Ade Stadium; West Lafayette, IN (rivalry)	ABC	L 7–40	67,861	
October 7	at Minnesota	Hubert H. Humphrey Metrodome; Minneapolis, MN		L 15–35	36,621	
October 14	No. 16 Illinois	Ross–Ade Stadium; West Lafayette, IN (rivalry)		L 2–14	41,101	
October 21	at Ohio State	Ohio Stadium; Columbus, OH		L 3–21	89,091	
October 28	Michigan State^{†}	Ross–Ade Stadium; West Lafayette, IN		L 21–28	41,402	
November 4	at No. 4 Michigan	Michigan Stadium; Ann Arbor, MI		L 27–42	105,128	
November 11	Northwestern	Ross–Ade Stadium; West Lafayette, IN		W 46–15	31,470	
November 18	Iowa	Ross–Ade Stadium; West Lafayette, IN		L 0–24	31,863	
November 25	at Indiana	Memorial Stadium; Bloomington, IN (Old Oaken Bucket)		W 15–14	47,502	
*Non-conference game; ^{†}Homecoming; Rankings from AP Poll released prior to the game

== Preseason ==
Brian Fox transferred after spring practice to Florida, citing a desire to be closer to home and head coach Fred Akers' adjustment of the offensive scheme.

== Game summaries ==
=== Notre Dame ===
#1 Notre Dame Fighting Irish (3–0) at Purdue Boilermakers (1–1)

Quarter	1	2	3	4	Total
Notre Dame	14	20	0	6	40
Purdue	0	0	0	7	7

at Ross–Ade Stadium, West Lafayette, Indiana

- Date: September 30
- Game time: 12:00 p.m. EDT
- Game attendance: 67,861
- TV: ABC
- Recap/Box Score

Game information

First quarter

- ND – Anthony Johnson 6-yard run (Craig Hentrich kick), 6:38. Notre Dame 7–0. Drive: 55 yards.
- ND – Tony Rice 4-yard run (Craig Hentrich kick), 2:04. Notre Dame 14–0. Drive: 57 yards.

Second quarter

- ND – Jeff Alm 16-yard interception return (Craig Hentrich kick), 14:44. Notre Dame 21–0.
- ND – Anthony Johnson 1-yard run (Craig Hentrich kick), 6:35. Notre Dame 28–0.
- ND – Ricky Watters 1-yard run (kick failed), 0:14. Notre Dame 34–0.

Third quarter

- No scoring

Fourth quarter

- ND – Craig Hentrich 19-yard field goal, 9:47. Notre Dame 37–0.
- ND – Craig Hentrich 22-yard field goal, 6:18. Notre Dame 40–0.
- PUR – Rodney Dennis 3-yard pass from Steve Letnich (Larry Sullivan kick), 0:33. Notre Dame 40–7.

Top passers

- ND – Tony Rice – 12/15, 270 yards
- PUR – Steve Letnich – 11/28, 89 yards, INT

Top rushers

- ND – Tony Rice – 12 rushes, 67 yards, TD
- PUR – Steve Letnich – 13 rushes, 50 yards

Top receivers

- ND – Derek Brown – 4 receptions, 101 yards
- PUR – Earl Coleman – 2 receptions, 32 yards

=== At Minnesota ===
Purdue Boilermakers (1–2) at Minnesota Golden Gophers (2–1)

Quarter	1	2	3	4	Total
Purdue	0	3	0	12	15
Minnesota	7	7	14	7	35

at Hubert H. Humphrey Metrodome, Minneapolis, Minnesota

- Date: October 7, 1989
- Game weather: Indoors (dome)
- Game attendance: 36,621
- Larry Sullivan tied a school record with 51-yard field goal
- Darren Trieb was suspended for the game for violation of team rules

Team	Category	Player	Statistics
Purdue	Passing	Jeff Lesniewicz	13/19, 191 Yds, TD, INT
Purdue	Rushing		
Purdue	Receiving		
Minnesota	Passing	Scott Schaffner	9/19, 144 Yds, 2 TD
Minnesota	Rushing	Marcus Evans	102 Yds, TD
Minnesota	Receiving		

Scoring summary

Quarter	Time	Drive			Team	Scoring information	Score	
Quarter	Time	Plays	Yards	TOP	Team	Scoring information	PUR	MINN
1					Minnesota	Darrell Thompson 7-yard touchdown run, kick good	0	7
2					Purdue	51-yard field goal by Larry Sullivan	3	7
2	4:16		84		Minnesota	Marcus Evans 2-yard touchdown run, kick good	3	14
3		2			Minnesota	James King 34-yard touchdown reception from Scott Schaffner, kick good	3	21
3					Minnesota	Shane Strain 32-yard touchdown reception from Scott Schaffner, kick good	3	28
4					Minnesota	Marquel Fleetwood 3-yard touchdown run, kick good	3	35
4	5:17				Purdue	Jerome Sparkman 20-yard touchdown run, 2-point conversion failed	9	35
4	0:00				Purdue	Rod Dennis 37-yard touchdown reception from Jeff Lesniewicz, 2-point conversion failed	15	35
"TOP" = time of possession. For other American football terms, see Glossary of American football.							15	35

=== Illinois ===
#16 Illinois Fighting Illini (3–1) at Purdue Boilermakers (1–3)

Quarter	1	2	3	4	Total
Illinois	7	0	0	7	14
Purdue	0	0	0	2	2

at Ross–Ade Stadium, West Lafayette, Indiana

- Date: October 14, 1989
- Game attendance: 41,101

Jeff Lesniewicz made his first career start for Purdue

We feel real good about ourselves. All we did was read in the paper all week was that we were going to lose by 32 points, and Jeff George was going to come in and do his thing.

— Darrin Trieb

Team	Category	Player	Statistics
Illinois	Passing	Jeff George	24/42, 254 Yds, TD
Illinois	Rushing	Howard Griffith	24 Rush, 94 Yds, TD
Illinois	Receiving		
Purdue	Passing	Jeff Lesniewicz	9/22, 82 Yds
Purdue	Rushing		
Purdue	Receiving		

Scoring summary

Quarter	Time	Drive			Team	Scoring information	Score	
Quarter	Time	Plays	Yards	TOP	Team	Scoring information	ILL	PUR
1	9:49	16	80		Illinois	Frank Hartley 3-yard touchdown reception from Jeff George, kick good	7	0
4	12:13				Purdue	Safety, Craig Davisson blocked punt by Brian Menkhausen out of end zone	7	2
4	0:36		80		Illinois	Howard Griffith 1-yard touchdown run, kick good	14	2
"TOP" = time of possession. For other American football terms, see Glossary of American football.							14	2

=== At Ohio State ===
Purdue Boilermakers (1–4) at Ohio State Buckeyes (3–2)

Quarter	1	2	3	4	Total
Purdue	0	0	3	0	3
Ohio St	14	0	7	0	21

at Ohio Stadium, Columbus, Ohio

- Date: October 21
- Game time: 1:30 p.m.
- Game weather: Overcast, 44 °F (7 °C)
- Game attendance: 89,091
- Referee: Jim Kemerling
- Box Score

Game information

First quarter

- OSU – Greg Frey 4-yard run (Pat O'Morrow kick), 11:40. Ohio St 7–0. Drive: 3 plays, 26 yards, 0:53.
- OSU – Carlos Snow 1-yard run (Pat O'Morrow kick), 3:59. Ohio St 14–0. Drive: 10 plays, 62 yards, 4:43.

Second quarter

- No scoring

Third quarter

- OSU – Carlos Snow 3-yard run (Pat O'Morrow kick), 9:50. Ohio St 21–0. Drive: 5 plays, 44 yards, 0:59.
- PUR – Larry Sullivan 25-yard field goal, 5:35. Ohio St 21–3. Drive: 7 plays, 73 yards, 4:15.

Fourth quarter

- No scoring

Top passers

- PUR – Eric Hunter – 6/16, 147 yards
- OSU – Greg Frey – 3/9, 47 yards

Top rushers

- PUR – Jerome Sparkman – 18 rushes, 85 yards
- OSU – Carlos Snow – 18 rushes, 149 yards, 2 TD

Top receivers

- PUR – Jerome Sparkman – 6 receptions, 86 yards
- OSU – Jeff Graham – 2 receptions, 37 yards

=== Michigan State ===
Michigan State Spartans (2–4) at Purdue Boilermakers (1–5)

Quarter	1	2	Total
Michigan St	0	28	28
Purdue	0	21	21

at Ross–Ade Stadium, West Lafayette, Indiana

- Date: October 28, 1989
- Game attendance: 41,402

Homecoming
Jeff Lesniewicz knocked out of game with concussion

Team	Category	Player	Statistics
Michigan St	Passing		
Michigan St	Rushing		
Michigan St	Receiving	Courtney Hawkins	7 Rec, 193 Yds, TD
Purdue	Passing	Eric Hunter	18/26, 253 Yds, 3 TD, INT
Purdue	Rushing		
Purdue	Receiving		

Scoring summary

Quarter	Time	Drive			Team	Scoring information	Score	
Quarter	Time	Plays	Yards	TOP	Team	Scoring information	MSU	PUR
3					Michigan St	Courtney Hawkins 80-yard touchdown reception from Dan Enos, kick good	14	0
4					Purdue	Calvin Williams -yard touchdown reception from Eric Hunter, Larry Sullivan kick good	28	7
4		5	69		Purdue	Rod Dennis 20-yard touchdown reception from Eric Hunter, Larry Sullivan kick good	28	14
4		2	41		Purdue	Abe Hoskins 34-yard touchdown reception from Eric Hunter, Larry Sullivan kick good	28	21
"TOP" = time of possession. For other American football terms, see Glossary of American football.							28	21

=== At Michigan ===
Purdue Boilermakers (1–6) at #4 Michigan Wolverines (6–1)

Quarter	1	2	3	4	Total
Purdue	0	7	0	20	27
Michigan	7	21	7	7	42

at Michigan Stadium, Ann Arbor, Michigan

- Date: November 4, 1989
- Game time: 1:00 p.m.
- Game weather: Overcast, 44 °F (7 °C)
- Game attendance: 105, 126
- Box Score

External videos
- Game highlights

Team	Category	Player	Statistics
Purdue	Passing	Eric Hunter	27/42, 344 Yds, 4 TD, 2 INT
Purdue	Rushing	Jerome Sparkman	11 Rush, 50 Yds
Purdue	Receiving	Calvin Williams	13 Rec, 156 Yds, 3 TD
Michigan	Passing	Michael Taylor	8/13, 124 Yds, TD
Michigan	Rushing	Tony Boles	13 Rush, 80 Yds, 2 TD
Michigan	Receiving	Chris Calloway	3 Rec, 68 Yds, TD

Scoring summary

Quarter	Time	Drive			Team	Scoring information	Score	
Quarter	Time	Plays	Yards	TOP	Team	Scoring information	PU	UM
1	9:16	4	77	1:23	Michigan	Tony Boles 39-yard touchdown run, J.D. Carlson kick good	0	7
2	12:50	3	9	1:17	Michigan	Desmond Howard 8-yard touchdown reception from Michael Taylor, J.D. Carlson kick good	0	14
2	5:46	8	77	3:25	Purdue	Calvin Williams 44-yard touchdown reception from Eric Hunter, Larry Sullivan kick good	7	14
2	2:31	8	80	3:15	Michigan	Tony Boles 1-yard touchdown run, J.D. Carlson kick good	7	21
2	0:09	5	79	0:55	Michigan	Chris Calloway 29-yard touchdown reception from Elvis Grbac, J.D. Carlson kick good	7	28
3	1:10	3	16	0:57	Michigan	Leroy Hoard 2-yard touchdown run, J.D. Carlson kick good	7	35
4	13:03	1	11	0:06	Purdue	Robert Oglesby 11-yard touchdown reception from Eric Hunter, Larry Sullivan kick good	14	35
4	12:52				Michigan	Kickoff returned 85 yards for touchdown by Tony Boles, J.D. Carlson kick good	14	42
4	6:48	3	34	1:19	Purdue	Calvin Williams 3-yard touchdown reception from Eric Hunter, Larry Sullivan kick good	21	42
4	2:33	4	61	1:14	Purdue	Calvin Williams 15-yard touchdown reception from Eric Hunter, Larry Sullivan kick no good (wide right)	27	42
"TOP" = time of possession. For other American football terms, see Glossary of American football.							27	42

=== Northwestern ===
Northwestern Wildcats (0–8) at Purdue Boilermakers (1–7)

Quarter	1	2	3	4	Total
Northwestern	0	7	8	0	15
Purdue	32	0	0	14	46

at Ross–Ade Stadium, West Lafayette, Indiana

- Date: November 11, 1989
- Game attendance: 31,470

Purdue snapped a streak of 10 straight games without a first quarter point.

Team	Category	Player	Statistics
Northwestern	Passing	Tim O'Brien	15/40, 213 Yds, 2 TD
Northwestern	Rushing	Bob Christian	21 Rush, 59 Yds
Northwestern	Receiving		
Purdue	Passing	Eric Hunter	11/24, 263 Yds, 3 TD
Purdue	Rushing	Eric Hunter	9 Rush, 55 Yds
Purdue	Receiving	Rod Dennis	4 Rec, 146 Yds, 3 TD

Scoring summary

Quarter	Time	Drive			Team	Scoring information	Score	
Quarter	Time	Plays	Yards	TOP	Team	Scoring information	NW	PUR
1	13:25				Purdue	Blocked punt returned 35 yards for touchdown by Rick Smith, Larry Sullivan kick good	0	7
1			2:02		Purdue	37-yard field goal by Larry Sullivan	0	10
1					Purdue	Rod Dennis 39-yard touchdown reception from Eric Hunter, Larry Sullivan kick good	0	17
1		2			Purdue	Larry Coleman 6-yard touchdown run, 2-point run good	0	25
1			1:02		Purdue	Rod Dennis 46-yard touchdown reception from Eric Hunter, Larry Sullivan kick good	0	32
2	7:38				Northwestern	Richard Buchanan 13-yard touchdown reception from Tim O'Brien, kick good	7	32
3	6:32				Northwestern	Greg Fischer 6-yard touchdown reception from Tim O'Brien, 2-point pass good	15	32
4	11:23				Purdue	Calvin Williams 44-yard touchdown reception from Eric Hunter, Larry Sullivan kick good	15	39
4	1:51				Purdue	Rod Dennis 57-yard touchdown reception from Jeff Lesniewicz, Larry Sullivan kick good	15	46
"TOP" = time of possession. For other American football terms, see Glossary of American football.							15	46

=== At Indiana ===
Purdue Boilermakers (2–8) at Indiana Hoosiers (5–5)

Quarter	1	2	Total
Purdue	3	12	15
Indiana	11	3	14

at Memorial Stadium, Bloomington, Indiana

- Date: November 25, 1989
- Game attendance: 51,502

Larry Sullivan kicked a 32-yard field goal with 2:51 left and Scott Bonnell missed a 26-yard field goal for Indiana with 1:29 remaining. Fred Akers was carried off the field by his players.

Team	Category	Player	Statistics
Purdue	Passing	Eric Hunter	15/24, 184 Yds, TD
Purdue	Rushing	Tony Vinson	9 Rush, 28 Yds
Purdue	Receiving	Rod Dennis	4 Rec, 81 Yds
Indiana	Passing	Dave Schnell	11/21, 99 Yds
Indiana	Rushing	Anthony Thompson	28 Rush, 97 Yds
Indiana	Receiving	Anthony Thompson	4 Rec, 28 Yds

Scoring summary

Quarter	Time	Drive			Team	Scoring information	Score	
Quarter	Time	Plays	Yards	TOP	Team	Scoring information	PUR	IU
2					Indiana	Dave Schnell 3-yard touchdown run, Scott Bonnell kick no good		
					Indiana	26-yard field goal by Scott Bonnell		
					Indiana	Safety, Jeff Zgonina snapped ball out of end zone		
					Purdue	24-yard field goal by Larry Sullivan		
3	1:11				Indiana	27-yard field goal by Scott Bonnell	3	14
4	14:42	8	79		Purdue	Calvin Williams 20-yard touchdown reception from Eric Hunter, 2-point pass failed	9	14
4	11:23	3			Purdue	29-yard field goal by Larry Sullivan	12	14
4	2:51				Purdue	32-yard field goal by Larry Sullivan	15	14
"TOP" = time of possession. For other American football terms, see Glossary of American football.							15	14

== Personnel ==
1989 Purdue Boilermakers football team roster
Players
Coaches
Offense

Pos.	#	Name	Class
FB	38	Mike Doctor	So
OL		Bruce Brinerman
OL		Jason Cegielski
FB	34	Earl Coleman	Fr
OL		Scott Conover
RB		Don Delvy
WR		Rodney Dennis	Fr
OL		Bob Dressel
RB		Adoaf Harris
OL		Bill Hitchcock
WR		Abe Hoskins	Fr
QB	9	Eric Hunter	Fr
WR		Kipp Koonce
QB		Jeff Lesniewicz	RFr
QB	14	Steve Letnich
WR		Danny Lounsbury
TE		Dwayne O'Connor
WR		Robert Oglesby
TE		Andy Ozlowski
OL		Derick Schmidt
RB		Jerome Sparkman
OL		Larry Taylor
TE		Kelly Turner
RB		Tony Vinson	Fr
WR		Jim Wallace
WR		Calvin Williams	Sr
OL		Jeff Wormsley

Defense

Pos.	#	Name	Class
LB		Eric Beatty
DL		Kris Burns
OL		Dennis Dotson
CB		Steve Jackson	Jr
DB		Terry Johnson
CB		Derrick Kelson	Sr
DL		Frank Kmet
DL		Ken Kushner
DL		Donzel Leggett
DB		Nat Martin
DL		Peyton Minter
S		Jarrett Scales
OLB		Jim Schwantz	So
ILB		Darren Trieb	Jr
DB		Sean Washington	Fr
DL		Jeff Zgonina

Special teams

Pos.	#	Name	Class
P, QB		Shawn McCarthy	Sr
K		Larry Sullivan

Head coach

- Fred Akers

Coordinators/assistant coaches

- Bill Kollar (DL/ST)
- Dan Lounsbury (RB/WR)
- Bill Michael (TE/OT)

Legend

- (C) Team captain
- (S) Suspended
- (I) Ineligible
- Injured
- Redshirt

== Awards ==
Eric Hunter, Big Ten Freshman of the Year
