= 1989 Wisconsin Badgers football team =

American college football season

1989 Wisconsin Badgers football
- Conference: Big Ten Conference
- Record: 2–9 (1–7 Big Ten)
- Head coach: Don Morton (3rd season)
- Offensive coordinator: Pat Simmers (3rd season)
- Offensive scheme: Veer
- Defensive coordinator: Mike Daly (3rd season)
- Base defense: 3–4
- MVP: Tim Knoeck
- Captains: Dan Kissling; Tim Knoeck
- Home stadium: Camp Randall Stadium

1989 Big Ten Conference football standings
	Conf.					Overall
Team	W		L		T	W		L		T
No. 7 Michigan $	8	–	0	–	0	10	–	2	–	0
No. 10 Illinois	7	–	1	–	0	10	–	2	–	0
No. 16 Michigan State	6	–	2	–	0	8	–	4	–	0
No. 24 Ohio State	6	–	2	–	0	8	–	4	–	0
Minnesota	4	–	4	–	0	6	–	5	–	0
Indiana	3	–	5	–	0	5	–	6	–	0
Iowa	3	–	5	–	0	5	–	6	–	0
Purdue	2	–	6	–	0	3	–	8	–	0
Wisconsin	1	–	7	–	0	2	–	9	–	0
Northwestern	0	–	8	–	0	0	–	11	–	0
$ – Conference champion; Rankings from AP Poll

The 1989 Wisconsin Badgers football team represented the University of Wisconsin–Madison as a member of the Big Ten Conference during the 1989 NCAA Division I-A football season. Led by Don Morton in his third and final season as head coach, the Badgers compiled an overall record of 2–9 with a mark of 1–7 in conference play, placing ninth in the Big Ten. Wisconsin played home games at Camp Randall Stadium in Madison, Wisconsin.

== Schedule ==
Date	Opponent	Site	Result	Attendance	Source
September 9	No. 3 Miami (FL)*	Camp Randall Stadium; Madison, WI	L 3–51	38,646	
September 16	Toledo*	Camp Randall Stadium; Madison, WI	W 23–10	37,162	
September 23	at California*	California Memorial Stadium; Berkeley, CA	L 14–20	36,000	
October 7	at No. 5 Michigan	Michigan Stadium; Ann Arbor, MI	L 0–24	104,097	
October 14	Iowa	Camp Randall Stadium; Madison, WI (rivalry)	L 24–31	62,402	
October 21	Northwestern^{†}	Camp Randall Stadium; Madison, WI	W 35–31	44,978	
October 28	at No. 8 Illinois	Memorial Stadium; Champaign, IL	L 9–32	64,856	
November 4	at Minnesota	Hubert H. Humphrey Metrodome; Minneapolis, MN (rivalry)	L 22–24	39,325	
November 11	Indiana	Camp Randall Stadium; Madison, WI	L 17–45	37,442	
November 18	at No. 22 Ohio State	Ohio Stadium; Columbus, OH	L 22–42	89,626	
November 25	No. 25 Michigan State	Camp Randall Stadium; Madison, WI	L 3–31	29,776	
*Non-conference game; ^{†}Homecoming; Rankings from AP Poll released prior to the game

== Game summaries ==
=== Miami (FL) ===
#3 Miami (FL) at Wisconsin

Team	1	2	3	4	Total
• Hurricanes	13	21	10	7	51
Badgers	3	0	0	0	3

- Date: September 9
- Location: Camp Randall Stadium, Madison, Wisconsin
- Game attendance: 38,646
- TV announcers (ABC): Keith Jackson, Bob Griese, Mike Adamle

Scoring summary
1		WIS	Thompson 38-yard field goal	WIS 3–0
1		MIA	Huerta 28-yard field goal	Tied 3–3
1		MIA	Huerta 43-yard field goal	MIA 6–3
1		MIA	Conley 1-yard run (Huerta kick)	MIA 13–3
2		MIA	Carroll 15-yard pass from Erickson (Huerta kick)	MIA 20–3
2		MIA	Carroll 10-yard pass from Erickson (Huerta kick)	MIA 27–3
2		MIA	Hill 3-yard pass from Erickson (Huerta kick)	MIA 34–3
3		MIA	Huerta 24-yard field goal	MIA 37–3
3		MIA	Aaron 3-yard pass from Erickson (Huerta kick)	MIA 44–3
4	7:57	MIA	Kevin Gibbs 6-yard run (Huerta kick)	MIA 51–3

=== At Minnesota ===
Wisconsin Badgers (2–5) at Minnesota Golden Gophers (4–3)

Quarter	1	2	Total
Wisconsin	7	15	22
Minnesota	10	14	24

- Date: November 4, 1989
- Game time: 2:30 p.m. EDT
- Game weather: Indoors (dome)
- Game attendance: 39,325

Team	Category	Player	Statistics
Wisconsin	Passing		
Wisconsin	Rushing	Robert Williams	21 Rush, 129 Yds, TD
Wisconsin	Receiving		
Minnesota	Passing		
Minnesota	Rushing	Darrell Thompson	32 Rush, 143 Yds, TD
Minnesota	Receiving		

Scoring summary

Quarter	Time	Drive			Team	Scoring information	Score	
Quarter	Time	Plays	Yards	TOP	Team	Scoring information	WISC	MINN
1	10:20	11	86		Minnesota	Darrell Thompson 1-yard touchdown run, Brent Berglund kick good	0	7
2	0:38				Wisconsin	Lionell Crawford 2-yard touchdown run, kick good	7	7
2	0:00				Minnesota	39-yard field goal by Bert Berglund	7	10
					Wisconsin	Touchdown	14	10
					Minnesota	Chris Gaiters 17-yard touchdown reception from Scott Schaffner, Bert Berglund kick good	14	17
					Minnesota	Interception returned 73 yards for touchdown by Ron Goetz, Bert Berglund kick good	14	24
			80		Wisconsin	Robert Williams 6-yard touchdown run, 2-point run good	22	24
"TOP" = time of possession. For other American football terms, see Glossary of American football.							22	24

=== Indiana ===
The Badgers allowed Indiana running back Anthony Thompson to rush for 377 yards in a game on November 11. This broke the NCAA Division I-A record and stood as a Big Ten Conference single-game rushing record for 25 years until it was broken by Melvin Gordon in 2014. The 377 yards still stands as an Indiana Hoosiers football school record.

=== At Ohio State ===
Wisconsin Badgers (2–7) at #22 Ohio State Buckeyes (7–2)

Quarter	1	2	3	4	Total
Wisconsin	3	10	3	6	22
Ohio St	7	21	14	0	42

at Ohio Stadium, Columbus, Ohio

- Date: November 10
- Game time: 1:30 p.m.
- Game weather: Partly cloudy, 28 °F (−2 °C)
- Game attendance: 89,626
- Referee: Jim Kemmerling
- Box Score

Game information

First quarter

- WIS – Rich Thompson 40-yard field goal, 12:06. Wisconsin 3–0. Drive: 7 plays, 16 yards, 2:45.
- OSU – Dante Lee 1-yard run (Pat O'Morrow kick), 5:00. Ohio St 7–3. Drive: 15 plays, 66 yards, 7:01.

Second quarter

- WIS – Rich Thompson 36-yard field goal, 10:35. Ohio St 7–6. Drive: 12 plays, 66 yards, 6:04.
- WIS – Troy Vincent 71-yard punt return (Rich Thompson kick), 8:35. Wisconsin 13–7.
- OSU – Jim Palmer 9-yard pass from Greg Frey (Pat O'Morrow kick), 6:25. Ohio St 14–13. Drive: 6 plays, 66 yards, 2:05.
- OSU – Dante Lee 18-yard run (Pat O'Morrow kick), 1:24. Ohio St 21–13. Drive: 8 plays, 75 yards, 3:00.
- OSU – David Brown 43-yard interception return (Pat O'Morrow kick), 1:07. Ohio St 28–13.

Third quarter

- OSU – Scottie Graham 16-yard run (Pat O'Morrow kick), 12:13. Ohio St 35–13. Drive: 6 plays, 61 yards, 2:38.
- WIS – Rich Thompson 35-yard field goal, 9:34. Ohio St 35–18. Drive: 7 plays, 46 yards, 2:33.
- OSU – Scottie Graham 1-yard run (Pat O'Morrow kick), 3:10. Ohio St 42–18. Drive: 12 plays, 62 yards, 6:16.

Fourth quarter

- WIS – Craig Hudson 5-yard run (run failed), 8:26. Ohio St 42–24. Drive: 8 plays, 30 yards, 3:54.

Top passers

- WIS – Lionell Crawford – 0/8, 0 yards, INT
- OSU – Greg Frey – 10/15, 151 yards, TD

Top rushers

- WIS – Lionell Crawford – 16 rushes, 104 yards
- OSU – Scottie Graham – 23 rushes, 152 yards, 2 TD

Top receivers

- WIS – None
- OSU – Bobby Olive – 3 receptions, 44 yards

== Personnel ==
1989 Wisconsin Badgers football team roster
Players
Coaches
Offense

Pos.	#	Name	Class
C	55	Jim Basten	Jr
OT	75	Burt Ising	Sr
QB, P	20	Brad Brekke	Jr
WR	19	Aaron Brown	Fr
WR	85	Tom Browne, Jr	So
RB	2	Tywin Claypool	So
QB	13	Lionell Crawford	So
RB	4	Damone Freeman	So
C	52	Rick Godfrey	So
RB	16	Jimmy Henderson	Fr
TE	81	Craig Hudson	Sr
RB	32	Leon Hunt	Sr
TE	19	Tim Kowalski	Sr
G	77	Joe Magazzeni	Sr
G	76	Jeff Miller	Jr
TE	89	Kerry Miller	Jr
WR	29	Fred Owens	Jr
OT	78	Brady Pierce	Jr
G	56	Nick Polczinski	Jr
OT	50	David Rapps	Jr
WR	23	Tony Spaeth	Fr
WR	43	Mike Tams	Jr
WR	15	Tim Ware	Fr
WR	28	Tyrone Washington	Jr
RB	3	Robert Williams	So
QB	12	Sean Wilson	Fr

Defense

Pos.	#	Name	Class
NG	74	John Banaszak	Sr
DE	94	Dan Batsch	Jr
LB	57	Gary Casper	Fr
DE	91	Don Davey	Jr
CB	7	Eddie Fletcher, Jr	So
DB	26	Chris Hiltgen	Sr
LB	58	Malvin Hunter	Jr
DT	65	Leon Johnson	Sr
LB	44	Dan Kissling (C)	Sr
LB	93	Tim Knoeck (C)	Sr
DT	98	Todd Kowalkowski	Jr
LB	42	Brendan Lynch	So
S	6	Tyrone Mahone	Jr
LB	55	Curt Maternowski	So
DB	33	Philip McConnell	Sr
NG	90	Pat McGettigan	Fr
S	27	Scott Nelson	Fr
LB	46	Robert Newell	Jr
LB	48	Aaron Norvell	Fr
LB	25	Rafael Robinson	So
LB	36	Duer Sharp	So
S	39	Todd Strop	Jr
S	27	Greg Thomas	Jr
CB	22	Troy Vincent	So
CB	21	LaMarr White	Jr
LB	8	John L Williams	So

Special teams

Pos.	#	Name	Class
QB, P	20	Brad Brekke	Jr
K	9	Robb Mehring	Jr
K	18	Rich Thompson	Fr

Head coach

- Don Morton

Coordinators/assistant coaches

- Pat Simmers – Offensive Coordinator/Offensive Line
- Mike Daly – Defensive Coordinator/Defensive Backs
- Bob Babich – Offensive Line
- Jacob Burney – Defensive Line
- L. C. Cole – Outside Linebackers
- Phil Engle – Inside Linebackers
- Jimmy Gonzales – Defensive Line
- Mark Mauer – Tight Ends/Wide Receivers
- Scott Seeliger – Quarterbacks/Running Backs
- Ken Ellett – Director of Football Operations/Recruiting Coordinator
- Mario Russo – Administrative Assistant

Legend

- (C) Team captain
- (S) Suspended
- (I) Ineligible
- Injured
- Redshirt

== 1990 NFL draft ==
Player	Position	Round	Pick	NFL club
Craig Hudson	Tight End	10	263	Kansas City Chiefs
