= 1989 Illinois Fighting Illini football team =

American college football season

1989 Illinois Fighting Illini football

Florida Citrus Bowl champion

Florida Citrus Bowl, W 31–21 vs. Virginia
- Conference: Big Ten Conference

Ranking
- Coaches: No. 10
- AP: No. 10
- Record: 10–2 (7–1 Big Ten)
- Head coach: John Mackovic (2nd season)
- Offensive coordinator: Gene Dahlquist (2nd season)
- Defensive coordinator: Lou Tepper (2nd season)
- MVPs: Mike Bellamy; Moe Gardner
- Captains: Craig Schneider; Steve Glasson; Mike Bellamy; Moe Gardner
- Home stadium: Memorial Stadium

1989 Big Ten Conference football standings
| | Conf. | | | | | Overall |
| Team | W | | L | | T | W | | L | | T |
|---|---|---|---|---|---|---|---|---|---|---|
| No. 7 Michigan $ | 8 | – | 0 | – | 0 | 10 | – | 2 | – | 0 |
| No. 10 Illinois | 7 | – | 1 | – | 0 | 10 | – | 2 | – | 0 |
| No. 16 Michigan State | 6 | – | 2 | – | 0 | 8 | – | 4 | – | 0 |
| No. 24 Ohio State | 6 | – | 2 | – | 0 | 8 | – | 4 | – | 0 |
| Minnesota | 4 | – | 4 | – | 0 | 6 | – | 5 | – | 0 |
| Indiana | 3 | – | 5 | – | 0 | 5 | – | 6 | – | 0 |
| Iowa | 3 | – | 5 | – | 0 | 5 | – | 6 | – | 0 |
| Purdue | 2 | – | 6 | – | 0 | 3 | – | 8 | – | 0 |
| Wisconsin | 1 | – | 7 | – | 0 | 2 | – | 9 | – | 0 |
| Northwestern | 0 | – | 8 | – | 0 | 0 | – | 11 | – | 0 |
$ – Conference champion; Rankings from AP Poll

The 1989 Illinois Fighting Illini football team was an American football team that represented the University of Illinois as a member of the Big Ten Conference during the 1989 NCAA Division I-A football season. In their second year under head coach John Mackovic, the Fighting Illini compiled a 10–2 record (7–1 in conference games), finished in second place in the Big Ten, and outscored opponents by a total of 301 to 161. Illinois concluded its season in the 1990 Florida Citrus Bowl, defeating Virginia by a 31–21 score. They were ranked No. 10 in the final AP and UPI polls.

Quarterback Jeff George led the Big Ten with 216 completions, 348 pass attempts, 2,417 passing yards, and 19 passing touchdowns. George won the Sammy Baugh Trophy as the best quarterback in college football. The team's other statistical leaders included fullback Howard Griffith (654 rushing yards, 66 points scored) and wide receiver Mike Bellamy (51 receptions for 761 yards).

Nine Illinois players received first-team honors from the Associated Press (AP) or United Press International (UPI) on the 1989 All-Big Ten Conference football team: George at quarterback (AP-1, UPI-1); Bellamy at wide receiver (AP-2, UPI-1); center Curt Lovelace (AP-1); defensive linemen Mel Agee (AP-1, UPI-1) and Moe Gardner (AP-1, UPI-1); linebacker Darrick Brownlow (AP-1, UPI-1): and defensive backs Henry Jones (AP-1, UPI-1) and Marlon Primous (AP-2, UPI-1).

== Schedule ==
| Date | Time | Opponent | Rank | Site | TV | Result | Attendance | Source |
|---|---|---|---|---|---|---|---|---|
| September 4 | 7:00 pm | at No. 5 USC* | No. 22 | Los Angeles Memorial Coliseum; Los Angeles, CA | ABC | W 14–13 | 54,622 | |
| September 16 | 2:30 pm | at No. 8 Colorado* | No. 10 | Folsom Field; Boulder, CO | CBS | L 7–38 | 46,747 | |
| September 23 | 1:00 pm | Utah State* | No. 20 | Memorial Stadium; Champaign, IL | | W 41–2 | 61,553 | |
| October 7 | 2:30 pm | Ohio State | No. 18 | Memorial Stadium; Champaign, IL (Illibuck) | ABC | W 34–14 | 69,088 | |
| October 14 | 1:00 pm | at Purdue | No. 16 | Ross–Ade Stadium; West Lafayette, IN (rivalry) | | W 14–2 | 41,101 | |
| October 21 | 11:30 am | at Michigan State | No. 13 | Spartan Stadium; East Lansing, MI | ESPN | W 14–10 | 76,216 | |
| October 28 | 1:00 pm | Wisconsin^{†} | No. 8 | Memorial Stadium; Champaign, IL | | W 32–9 | 64,856 | |
| November 4 | 2:30 pm | at Iowa | No. 8 | Kinnick Stadium; Iowa City, IA | ABC | W 31–7 | 67,700 | |
| November 11 | 2:30 pm | No. 3 Michigan | No. 8 | Memorial Stadium; Champaign, IL (rivalry) | ABC | L 10–24 | 73,069 | |
| November 18 | 2:30 pm | Indiana | No. 12 | Memorial Stadium; Champaign, IL (rivalry) | ABC | W 41–28 | 53,368 | |
| November 25 | 2:00 pm | at Northwestern | No. 11 | Dyche Stadium; Evanston, IL (rivalry) | | W 63–14 | 31,017 | |
| January 1 | 12:30 pm | vs. No. 16 Virginia* | No. 11 | Florida Citrus Bowl; Orlando, FL (Florida Citrus Bowl) | ABC | W 31–21 | 60,016 | |
*Non-conference game; ^{†}Homecoming; Rankings from AP Poll released prior to the game; All times are in Central time

== Game summaries ==
=== Ohio State ===
Ohio State Buckeyes (2–1) at #18 Illinois Fighting Illini (2–1)

| Quarter | 1 | 2 | 3 | 4 | Total |
|---|---|---|---|---|---|
| Ohio St | 0 | 7 | 7 | 0 | 14 |
| Illinois | 7 | 3 | 14 | 10 | 34 |

at Memorial Stadium, Champaign, Illinois

- Date: October 7
- Game time: 2:30 p.m. CST
- Game weather: Sunny, 54 °F (12 °C)
- Game attendance: 69,088
- Referee: Gil Marchman
- TV: ABC
- Box Score

Game information

First quarter

- ILL – Howard Griffith 1-yard run (Doug Higgins kick), 1:01. Illinois 7–0. Drive: 5 plays, 45 yards, 1:59.

Second quarter

- OSU – Carlos Snow 7-yard run (Pat O'Morrow kick), 13:31. Tie 7–7. Drive: 7 plays, 66 yards, 2:30.
- ILL – Doug Higgins 26-yard field goal, 9:07. Illinois 10–7. Drive: 11 plays, 49 yards, 4:24.

Third quarter

- ILL – Howard Griffith 5-yard run (Chris Siambekos kick), 8:57. Illinois 17–7. Drive: 8 plays, 56 yards, 3:49.
- OSU – Jeff Graham 66-yard punt return (Pat O'Morrow kick), 4:22. Illinois 17–14.
- ILL – Mike Bellamy 34-yard pass from Steve Williams (Chris Siambekos kick), 3:30. Illinois 24–14. Drive: 3 plays, 60 yards, 0:52.

Fourth quarter

- ILL – Chris Siambekos 36-yard field goal, 14:49. Illinois 27–14. Drive: 7 plays, 11 yards, 2:26.
- ILL – Ken Thomas 36-yard run (Chris Siambekos kick), 3:27. Illinois 34–14. Drive: 10 plays, 99 yards, 4:17.

Top passers

- OSU – Greg Frey – 13/25, 137 yards, INT
- ILL – Jeff George – 12/20, 130 yards, 2 INT

Top rushers

- OSU – Carlos Snow – 21 rushes, 97 yards, TD
- ILL – Howard Griffith – 20 rushes, 117 yards, 2 TD

Top receivers

- OSU – Jeff Graham – 5 receptions, 71 yards
- ILL – Mike Bellamy – 10 receptions, 152 yards, TD

=== At Purdue ===
#16 Illinois Fighting Illini (3–1) at Purdue Boilermakers (1–3)

| Quarter | 1 | 2 | 3 | 4 | Total |
|---|---|---|---|---|---|
| Illinois | 7 | 0 | 0 | 7 | 14 |
| Purdue | 0 | 0 | 0 | 2 | 2 |

at Ross–Ade Stadium, West Lafayette, Indiana

- Date: October 14, 1989
- Game attendance: 41,101

Jeff George made his first appearance at Purdue since transferring following the 1986 season

| Team | Category | Player | Statistics |
|---|---|---|---|
| Illinois | Passing | Jeff George | 24/42, 254 Yds, TD |
| Illinois | Rushing | Howard Griffith | 24 Rush, 94 Yds, TD |
| Illinois | Receiving | | |
| Purdue | Passing | Jeff Lesniewicz | 9/22, 82 Yds |
| Purdue | Rushing | | |
| Purdue | Receiving | | |

Scoring summary

| Quarter | Time | Drive | | | Team | Scoring information | Score | |
| Quarter | Time | Plays | Yards | TOP | Team | Scoring information | ILL | PUR |
|---|---|---|---|---|---|---|---|---|
| 1 | 9:49 | 16 | 80 | | Illinois | Frank Hartley 3-yard touchdown reception from Jeff George, kick good | 7 | 0 |
| 4 | 12:13 | | | | Purdue | Safety, Craig Davisson blocked punt by Brian Menkhausen out of end zone | 7 | 2 |
| 4 | 0:36 | | 80 | | Illinois | Howard Griffith 1-yard touchdown run, kick good | 14 | 2 |
| "TOP" = time of possession. For other American football terms, see Glossary of American football. | | | | | | | 14 | 2 |

=== Florida Citrus Bowl (vs. Virginia) ===
Illinois vs. Virginia

| Team | 1 | 2 | 3 | 4 | Total |
|---|---|---|---|---|---|
| • No. 11 Fighting Illini | 7 | 10 | 7 | 7 | 31 |
| No. 16 Cavaliers | 0 | 7 | 7 | 7 | 21 |

- Date: January 1
- Location: Florida Citrus Bowl, Orlando, Florida
- Game attendance: 60,016
- Television network: ABC

== Roster ==
1989 Illinois Fighting Illini football team roster
Players
Coaches
Offense

| Pos. | # | Name | Class |
|---|---|---|---|
| RB | | Kameno Bell |
| WR | 2 | Mike Bellamy | Sr |
| RB | | Victor Bowlay-Williams |
| RB | | Darren Boyer |
| TE | | Dan Donovan |
| RB | | Steve Feagin |
| TE | | Jeff Finke |
| QB | 11 | Jeff George | Jr |
| RB | 29 | Howard Griffith | Jr |
| TE | 82 | Frank Hartley | Jr |
| OT | 79 | Brad Hopkins | So |
| QB | | Jeff Kinney |
| OL | | Tony Laster |
| RB | | Wagner Lester |
| OL | | Curt Lovelace |
| WR | | Gus Palma |
| OL | | Cam Pepper |
| WR | | Luke Petraitis |
| RB | | Alfred Pierce |
| WR | | Dino Pollock |
| OL | | Craig Schneider |
| RB | | Errol Shavers |
| WR | | Dave Silva |
| C | 69 | Tim Simpson | So |
| RB | | Art Slowinski |
| RB | | Ken Thomas |
| QB | | Jason Verduzco |
| WR | | Shawn Wax |
| WR | | Steve Williams |

Defense

| Pos. | # | Name | Class |
|---|---|---|---|
| DT | 96 | Mel Agee | Jr |
| LB | | Romero Brice |
| LB | | Julyon Brown |
| LB | 48 | Darrick Brownlow | Jr |
| DT | 95 | Moe Gardner | Jr |
| LB | | Steve Glasson |
| DB | 33 | Chris Green | Jr |
| LB | | Jason Guard |
| DB | | Mike Hopkins |
| DB | 18 | Henry Jones | Jr |
| DB | 37 | Steve Nelson | Jr |
| DB | | Quintin Parker |
| DB | | Marlon Primous |
| DL | | Sean Streeter |
| LB | | Brian Williams |

Special teams

| Pos. | # | Name | Class |
|---|---|---|---|
| K | | Doug Higgins |
| P | | Brian Menkhausen |
| K | | Chris Siambekos |

Head coach

- John Mackovic

Coordinators/assistant coaches

Legend

- (C) Team captain
- (S) Suspended
- (I) Ineligible
- Injured
- Redshirt

== Awards and honors ==
- Jeff George, Sammy Baugh Trophy

== 1990 NFL draft ==
| Player | Round | Pick | Position | Club |
| Jeff George | 1 | 1 | Quarterback | Indianapolis Colts |
| Mike Bellamy | 2 | 50 | Wide receiver | Philadelphia Eagles |
