= 1989 Iowa Hawkeyes football team =

American college football season

1989 Iowa Hawkeyes football
- Conference: Big Ten Conference
- Record: 5–6 (3–5 Big Ten)
- Head coach: Hayden Fry (11th season)
- Offensive coordinator: Carl Jackson (1st season)
- Offensive scheme: Pro-style
- Defensive coordinator: Bill Brashier (11th season)
- Base defense: 5–2
- MVPs: Richard Bass; Jim Johnson
- Captain: William "Billy" Anderson
- Home stadium: Kinnick Stadium

1989 Big Ten Conference football standings
	Conf.					Overall
Team	W		L		T	W		L		T
No. 7 Michigan $	8	–	0	–	0	10	–	2	–	0
No. 10 Illinois	7	–	1	–	0	10	–	2	–	0
No. 16 Michigan State	6	–	2	–	0	8	–	4	–	0
No. 24 Ohio State	6	–	2	–	0	8	–	4	–	0
Minnesota	4	–	4	–	0	6	–	5	–	0
Indiana	3	–	5	–	0	5	–	6	–	0
Iowa	3	–	5	–	0	5	–	6	–	0
Purdue	2	–	6	–	0	3	–	8	–	0
Wisconsin	1	–	7	–	0	2	–	9	–	0
Northwestern	0	–	8	–	0	0	–	11	–	0
$ – Conference champion; Rankings from AP Poll

The 1989 Iowa Hawkeyes football team represented the University of Iowa as a member of the Big Ten Conference during the 1989 NCAA Division I-A football season. Led by 11th-year head coach Hayden Fry, the Hawkeyes compiled an overall record of 5–6 with a mark of 3–5 in conference play, tying for sixth place in the Big Ten. Iowa failed to make a bowl game for the first time since the 1980 season. The team played home games at Kinnick Stadium in Iowa City, Iowa.

== Schedule ==
Date	Time	Opponent	Rank	Site	TV	Result	Attendance	Source
September 16	1:05 pm	Oregon*	No. 24	Kinnick Stadium; Iowa City, IA		L 6–44	67,700	
September 23	12:10 pm	at Iowa State*		Cyclone Stadium; Ames, IA (rivalry)		W 31–21	54,458	
September 30	1:05 pm	Tulsa*		Kinnick Stadium; Iowa City, IA		W 30–22	67,700	
October 7	1:05 pm	No. 24 Michigan State		Kinnick Stadium; Iowa City, IA		L 14–17	67,700	
October 14	1:00 pm	at Wisconsin		Camp Randall Stadium; Madison, WI (rivalry)		W 31–24	62,402	
October 21	2:30 pm	No. 5 Michigan		Kinnick Stadium; Iowa City, IA	ABC	L 12–26	67,700	
October 28	1:00 pm	at Northwestern		Dyche Stadium; Evanston, IL		W 35–22	36,312	
November 4	2:30 pm	No. 8 Illinois		Kinnick Stadium; Iowa City, IA	ABC	L 7–31	67,700	
November 11	11:30 am	at Ohio State		Ohio Stadium; Columbus, OH	ESPN	L 0–28	89,536	
November 18	2:00 pm	at Purdue		Ross–Ade Stadium; West Lafayette, IN		W 24–0	31,863	
November 25	1:05 pm	Minnesota		Kinnick Stadium; Iowa City, IA (rivalry)		L 7–43	67,700	
*Non-conference game; Rankings from AP Poll released prior to the game; All times are in Central time

== Game summaries ==
=== At Iowa State ===
The Hawkeyes defeated the Cyclones for the seventh consecutive time.

=== At Wisconsin ===
Nick Bell ran for a career high 217 yards and scored 3 touchdowns (2 rushing, 1 receiving) in the Hawkeyes' win over Wisconsin.

=== At Ohio State ===
Iowa Hawkeyes (4–4) at Ohio State Buckeyes (6–2)

Quarter	1	2	3	4	Total
Iowa	0	0	0	0	0
Ohio St	7	7	7	7	28

at Ohio Stadium, Columbus, Ohio

- Date: November 11
- Game time: 12:30 p.m. CDT
- Game weather: Overcast, 52 °F (11 °C)
- Game attendance: 89,536
- Referee: Jerry Hendrickson
- Box Score

Game information

First quarter

- OSU – Scottie Graham 3-yard run (Pat O'Morrow kick), 7:18. Ohio St 7–0. Drive: 9 plays, 40 yards, 3:54.

Second quarter

- OSU – Jeff Graham 8-yard pass from Greg Frey (Pat O'Morrow kick), 12:24. Ohio St 14–0. Drive: 15 plays, 80 yards, 5:44.

Third quarter

- OSU – Scottie Graham 9-yard pass from Greg Frey (Pat O'Morrow kick), 6:35. Ohio St 21–0. Drive: 6 plays, 87 yards, 2:14.

Fourth quarter

- OSU – Dante Lee 1-yard run (Pat O'Morrow kick), 10:51. Ohio St 28–0. Drive: 13 plays, 79 yards, 7:42.

Top passers

- IOWA – Matt Rodgers – 15/33, 201 yards
- OSU – Greg Frey – 11/19, 168 yards, 2 TD, INT

Top rushers

- IOWA – Richard Bass – 6 rushes, 30 yards
- OSU – Dante Lee – 13 rushes, 99 yards, TD

Top receivers

- IOWA – Travis Watkins – 4 receptions, 69 yards
- OSU – Jeff Graham – 3 receptions, 70 yards, TD

=== Minnesota ===
Minnesota Golden Gophers (5–5) at Iowa Hawkeyes (5–5)

Quarter	1	2	3	4	Total
Minnesota	7			30	37
Iowa	0	0	7	0	7

at Kinnick Stadium, Iowa City, Iowa

- Date: November 25, 1989
- Game time: 1:05 p.m. CDT
- Game attendance: 67,700
- TV: None
- Worst conference loss since 1980 vs. Purdue

Team	Category	Player	Statistics
Minnesota	Passing		
Minnesota	Rushing	Darrell Thompson	122 Yds
Minnesota	Receiving		
Iowa	Passing		
Iowa	Rushing	Nick Bell	19 Rush, 133 Yds
Iowa	Receiving		

Scoring summary

Quarter	Time	Drive			Team	Scoring information	Score	
Quarter	Time	Plays	Yards	TOP	Team	Scoring information	MINN	IOWA
1					Minnesota	Chris Gaiters 14-yard touchdown reception from Darrell Thompson, Brent Berglund kick good	7	0
3					Iowa	Mike Saunders 12-yard touchdown reception from Matt Rodgers, kick good		7
4					Minnesota	Marquel Fleetwood 22-yard touchdown run, 2-point pass failed	19	7
4					Minnesota	39-yard field goal by Brent Berglund	22	7
4	8:45				Minnesota	Interception returned 30 yards for touchdown by Eddie Miles, kick good	29	7
4	4:42				Minnesota	James King 5-yard touchdown run, kick good	36	7
4		4			Minnesota	Marcus Evans 1-yard touchdown run, kick good	43	7
"TOP" = time of possession. For other American football terms, see Glossary of American football.							43	7

== Roster ==
1989 Iowa Hawkeyes football team roster
Players
Coaches
Offense

Pos.	#	Name	Class
OL	75	Greg Aegerter	Jr
C	50	Bill Anderson	Sr
RB		Richard Bass
OL		Rob Baxley
RB	43	Nick Bell	Jr
TE	87	Alan Cross	Fr
OT	65	Scott Davis	Fr
C	60	Mike Devlin	Fr
WR	82	Jon Filloon	So
QB		Jim Hartlieb
OL		George Hawthorne
WR	3	Danan Hughes	Fr
RB		Marvin Lampkin
WR		Peter Marciano
OL	69	Mike Miller	Jr
FB	34	Lew Montgomery	Fr
WR		Scott Neuman
TE		John Palmer
QB	14	Tom Poholsky	Sr
OL		Jim Poynton
QB	7	Matt Rodgers	So
RB	32	Mike Saunders	So
RB	21	Tony Stewart	Jr
TE		Michael Titley
WR	2	Travis Watkins	Sr

Defense

Pos.	#	Name	Class
DL	91	Bret Bielema	Fr
DL		Larry Blue
DB	17	Phil Bradley	So
DB	29	Greg Brown	Jr
NG	54	Rod Davis	So
LB	31	John Derby	So
DL		Jason Dumont
LB	66	Melvin Foster	Jr
DE	96	Ron Geater	So
CB	45	Merton Hanks	Jr
DB	42	Tork Hook	Sr
DL	71	Jim Johnson	Jr
DL	51	Jeff Koeppel	Sr
DB		Eddie Polly
LB	35	Brad Quast	Sr
DL		Matt Ruhland
DL		Moses Santos
DL		Leroy Smith
DB		Mark Stoops
DB	15	Brian Wise	So
DB	10	Anthony Wright	Sr

Special teams

Pos.	#	Name	Class
P		Jim Hujsak
K		George Murphy
K	11	Jeff Skillett	So
P		Sean Snyder

Head coach

- Hayden Fry

Coordinators/assistant coaches

- Carl Jackson – Offensive Coordinator
- Bill Brashier – Defensive Coordinator
- Kirk Ferentz – Offensive line
- Dan McCarney – Defensive line
- Don Patterson – Quarterbacks/Wide receivers
- Bernie Wyatt – Defensive Ends/Recruiting Coordinator
- Bill Dervich – Strength and Conditioning

Legend

- (C) Team captain
- (S) Suspended
- (I) Ineligible
- Injured
- Redshirt

== Team players in the 1990 NFL draft ==
Player	Position	Round	Pick	NFL club
Bill Anderson	Center	7	176	Chicago Bears
Brad Quast	Linebacker	10	251	New York Jets
