= 1989 Indiana Hoosiers football team =

American college football season

1989 Indiana Hoosiers football
- Conference: Big Ten Conference
- Record: 5–6 (3–5 Big Ten)
- Head coach: Bill Mallory (6th season)
- Defensive coordinator: Joe Novak (6th season)
- MVP: Anthony Thompson
- Captains: Ian Beckles; Anthony Thompson
- Home stadium: Memorial Stadium

1989 Big Ten Conference football standings
	Conf.					Overall
Team	W		L		T	W		L		T
No. 7 Michigan $	8	–	0	–	0	10	–	2	–	0
No. 10 Illinois	7	–	1	–	0	10	–	2	–	0
No. 16 Michigan State	6	–	2	–	0	8	–	4	–	0
No. 24 Ohio State	6	–	2	–	0	8	–	4	–	0
Minnesota	4	–	4	–	0	6	–	5	–	0
Indiana	3	–	5	–	0	5	–	6	–	0
Iowa	3	–	5	–	0	5	–	6	–	0
Purdue	2	–	6	–	0	3	–	8	–	0
Wisconsin	1	–	7	–	0	2	–	9	–	0
Northwestern	0	–	8	–	0	0	–	11	–	0
$ – Conference champion; Rankings from AP Poll

The 1989 Indiana Hoosiers football team represented Indiana University Bloomington as a member of the Big Ten Conference during the 1989 NCAA Division I-A football season. Led by sixth-year head coach Bill Mallory, the Hoosiers compiled an overall record of 5–6 with a mark of 3–5 in conference play, tying for sixth place the Big Ten. It was Indiana's first losing season since 1985. The team played home games at Memorial Stadium in Bloomington, Indiana.

In the battle for the Old Oaken Bucket, Purdue beat Indiana. On November 24, Anthony Thompson was the top vote-getter and the only repeat selection on the 1989 Walter Camp All-America team. Thompson finished the season with 1,793 yards and 24 touchdowns. On December 2, a chorus of boos was heard throughout the Hoosier Dome during the Indiana–Kentucky basketball game when Andre Ware of the Houston Cougars was announced as the 55th recipient of the Heisman Trophy. Thompson finished second.

== Schedule ==
Date	Time	Opponent	Site	TV	Result	Attendance	Source
September 9	1:30 pm	at Kentucky*	Commonwealth Stadium; Lexington, KY (rivalry)		L 14–17	58,216	
September 16	2:00 pm	Missouri*	Memorial Stadium; Bloomington, IN		W 24–7	48,106	
September 30	2:00 pm	Toledo*	Memorial Stadium; Bloomington, IN		W 32–12	43,501	
October 7	2:00 pm	Northwestern	Memorial Stadium; Bloomington, IN		W 43–11	47,845	
October 14	1:30 pm	at Ohio State	Ohio Stadium; Columbus, OH		L 31–35	89,750	
October 21	2:00 pm	Minnesota^{†}	Memorial Stadium; Bloomington, IN		W 28–18	51,069	
October 28	12:00 pm	at No. 5 Michigan	Michigan Stadium; Ann Arbor, MI	ABC	L 10–38	105,989	
November 4	12:30 pm	Michigan State	Memorial Stadium; Bloomington, IN (rivalry)	ESPN	L 20–51	51,567	
November 11	2:00 pm	at Wisconsin	Camp Randall Stadium; Madison, WI		W 45–17	37,442	
November 18	3:30 pm	at No. 12 Illinois	Memorial Stadium; Champaign, IL (rivalry)	ABC	L 28–41	53,368	
November 25	2:00 pm	Purdue	Memorial Stadium; Bloomington, IN (Old Oaken Bucket)		L 14–15	47,502	
*Non-conference game; ^{†}Homecoming; Rankings from AP Poll released prior to the game; All times are in Eastern time

== Game summaries ==
=== At Ohio State ===
Indiana Hoosiers (3–1) at Ohio State Buckeyes (2–2)

Quarter	1	2	3	4	Total
Indiana	0	14	7	10	31
Ohio St	7	21	7	0	35

at Ohio Stadium, Columbus, Ohio

- Date: October 14
- Game time: 1:30 p.m.
- Game weather: Sunny, 75 °F (24 °C)
- Game attendance: 89,750
- Referee: John Nealon
- Box Score

Game information

First quarter

- OSU – Jim Palmer 2-yard pass from Greg Frey (Pat O'Morrow kick), 8:47. Ohio St 7–0. Drive: 10 plays, 45 yards, 5:01.

Second quarter

- IU – Anthony Thompson 9-yard run (Scott Bonnell kick), 11:04. Tie 7–7. Drive: 12 plays, 88 yards, 6:15.
- OSU – Scottie Graham 60-yard run (Pat O'Morrow kick), 9:21. Ohio St 14–7. Drive: 4 plays, 80 yards, 1:43.
- OSU – Carlos Snow 10-yard run (Pat O'Morrow kick), 5:15. Ohio St 21–7. Drive: 2 plays, 16 yards, 0:42.
- OSU – Jim Palmer 4-yard pass from Greg Frey (Pat O'Morrow kick), 3:45. Ohio St 28–7. Drive: 4 plays, 28 yards, 1:29.
- IU – Terry Saunders 2-yard pass from Dave Schnell (Scott Bonnell kick), 0:19. Ohio St 28–14. Drive: 9 plays, 73 yards, 3:26.

Third quarter

- OSU – Scottie Graham 1-yard run (Pat O'Morrow kick), 10:00. Ohio St 35–14. Drive: 11 plays, 80 yards, 5:00.
- IU – Anthony Thompson 2-yard run (Scott Bonnell kick), 4:17. Ohio St 35–21. Drive: 11 plays, 68 yards, 5:40.

Fourth quarter

- IU – Anthony Thompson 6-yard run (run good), 3:25. Ohio St 35–29. Drive: 10 plays, 90 yards, 3:29.
- IU – Safety, Greg Frey ran out of end zone, 1:38. Ohio St 35–31.

Top passers

- IU – Dave Schnell – 22/30, 247 yards, TD, 3 INT
- OSU – Greg Frey – 5/6, 37 yards, 2 TD

Top rushers

- IU – Anthony Thompson – 34 rushes, 177 yards, 3 TD
- OSU – Carlos Snow – 27 rushes, 143 yards, TD

Top receivers

- IU – Eddie Thomas – 7 receptions, 82 yards
- OSU – Bernard Edwards – 2 receptions, 21 yards

=== Michigan State ===
- Anthony Thompson scores his 60th career touchdown to set a then NCAA Division I-A record.

=== At Wisconsin ===
- The NCAA single-game rushing record of 357 yards, held by Rueben Mayes and Mike Pringle is broken as Anthony Thompson rushes for 377 yards in a 45–17 victory at Wisconsin. This stood as a Big Ten Conference record for 25 years until it was broken by Melvin Gordon (Wisconsin) in 2014. As of 2014, it still stands as the school record. Thompson also scores four touchdowns on the day.

=== Purdue ===
Purdue Boilermakers (2–8) at Indiana Hoosiers (5–5)

Quarter	1	2	Total
Purdue	3	12	15
Indiana	11	3	14

at Memorial Stadium, Bloomington, Indiana

- Date: November 25, 1989
- Game attendance: 51,502

Larry Sullivan kicked a 32-yard field goal with 2:51 left and Scott Bonnell missed a 26-yard field goal for Indiana with 1:29 remaining. The loss knocked the Hoosiers out of playing in the Freedom Bowl while others speculated it may have also contributed to Anthony Thompson not winning the Heisman Trophy.

Team	Category	Player	Statistics
Purdue	Passing	Eric Hunter	15/24, 184 Yds, TD
Purdue	Rushing	Tony Vinson	9 Rush, 28 Yds
Purdue	Receiving	Rod Dennis	4 Rec, 81 Yds
Indiana	Passing	Dave Schnell	11/21, 99 Yds
Indiana	Rushing	Anthony Thompson	28 Rush, 97 Yds
Indiana	Receiving	Anthony Thompson	4 Rec, 28 Yds

Scoring summary

Quarter	Time	Drive			Team	Scoring information	Score	
Quarter	Time	Plays	Yards	TOP	Team	Scoring information	PUR	IU
2					Indiana	Dave Schnell 3-yard touchdown run, Scott Bonnell kick no good		
					Indiana	26-yard field goal by Scott Bonnell		
					Indiana	Safety, Jeff Zgonina snapped ball out of end zone		
					Purdue	24-yard field goal by Larry Sullivan		
3	1:11				Indiana	27-yard field goal by Scott Bonnell	3	14
4	14:42	8	79		Purdue	Calvin Williams 20-yard touchdown reception from Eric Hunter, 2-point pass failed	9	14
4	11:23	3			Purdue	29-yard field goal by Larry Sullivan	12	14
4	2:51				Purdue	32-yard field goal by Larry Sullivan	15	14
"TOP" = time of possession. For other American football terms, see Glossary of American football.							15	14

== Personnel ==
1989 Indiana Hoosiers football team roster
Players
Coaches
Offense

Pos.	#	Name	Class
OL		Ian Beckles
RB		Woody Bryant
OL		Jack Francis
RB		Steve Goodrich
RB		Markell Granderson
QB	12	Trent Green	Fr
RB		Kevin Klee
OL		Jeff Marx
RB		Don Matejko
WR		Derrick Mays
WR		Scott McGowan
RB		Calvert Miller
OL		Todd Oberdorf
WR		Ray Potts
TE		Terry Saunders
OL		Randy Schneider
QB	11	Dave Schnell	Sr
WR		Chris Swartz
WR		Eddie Thomas
RB	32	Anthony Thompson	Sr
RB		Ernie Thompson
OL		Phil Trinter
OL		Ron Vargo
RB		Mike Waddell
TE		Todd Walker

Defense

Pos.	#	Name	Class
DB		Dave Ane
LB		Gene Boyd
DB		Mike Dumas	Jr
LB		Greg Farrall
LB		Mark Hagen
DL		Nolan Harrison
DL		Brian Hunnicut
DL		Jason Mack
LB		Troy Mason
DL		Larry McDaniel
DB		Mike Middleton
DL		John Miller
DB		Mark Newell
LB		Paul Williams
DB		Joe Ziegler

Special teams

Pos.	#	Name	Class
K		Scott Bonnell
P		Macky Smith

Head coach

- Bill Mallory

Coordinators/assistant coaches

Legend

- (C) Team captain
- (S) Suspended
- (I) Ineligible
- Injured
- Redshirt

== Awards and honors ==
- Anthony Thompson, Big Ten Player of the Year
- Anthony Thompson, Chicago Tribune Silver Football
- Anthony Thompson, Walter Camp Award
- Anthony Thompson, Maxwell Award

== 1990 NFL draftees ==
Player	Position	Round	Pick	NFL club
Anthony Thompson	Running back	2	31	Arizona Cardinals
Ian Beckles	Guard	5	114	Tampa Bay Buccaneers

- Trent Green joined the NFL in 1997 with the Washington Redskins.
