= 1989 Minnesota Golden Gophers football team =

American college football season

1989 Minnesota Golden Gophers football
- Conference: Big Ten Conference
- Record: 6–5 (4–4 Big Ten)
- Head coach: John Gutekunst (4th season)
- Captains: Mac Stephens; Darrell Thompson
- Home stadium: Hubert H. Humphrey Metrodome

1989 Big Ten Conference football standings
	Conf.					Overall
Team	W		L		T	W		L		T
No. 7 Michigan $	8	–	0	–	0	10	–	2	–	0
No. 10 Illinois	7	–	1	–	0	10	–	2	–	0
No. 16 Michigan State	6	–	2	–	0	8	–	4	–	0
No. 24 Ohio State	6	–	2	–	0	8	–	4	–	0
Minnesota	4	–	4	–	0	6	–	5	–	0
Indiana	3	–	5	–	0	5	–	6	–	0
Iowa	3	–	5	–	0	5	–	6	–	0
Purdue	2	–	6	–	0	3	–	8	–	0
Wisconsin	1	–	7	–	0	2	–	9	–	0
Northwestern	0	–	8	–	0	0	–	11	–	0
$ – Conference champion; Rankings from AP Poll

The 1989 Minnesota Golden Gophers football team represented the University of Minnesota in the 1989 NCAA Division I-A football season. In their fourth year under head coach John Gutekunst, the Golden Gophers compiled a 6–5 record and were outscored by their opponents by a combined total of 283 to 263.

Kicker Brent Berglund, offensive lineman Dan Liimata, tailback Darrell Thompson and defensive tackle Mike Sunvold were named All-Big Ten second team. Punter Brent Herbel was named Academic All-American. Running back Pat Cummings, punter Brent Herbel, offensive lineman Dan Liimatta, offensive lineman Jon Melander, quarterback Scott Schaffner and linebacker Joel Staats were named Academic All-Big Ten.

Darrell Thompson was awarded the Bronko Nagurski Award and Bruce Smith Award. Linebacker Eddie Miles was awarded the Carl Eller Award. Brent Berglund was awarded the Bobby Bell Award. Dan Liimatta was awarded the Butch Nash Award. Jon Melander was awarded the Paul Giel Award.

Total attendance for the season was 237,552, which averaged out to 39,592 per game. The season high for attendance was against the Nebraska Cornhuskers.

== Schedule ==
Date	Time	Opponent	Site	TV	Result	Attendance	Source
September 16	1:00 pm	at Iowa State*	Cyclone Stadium; Ames, IA		W 30–20	45,410	
September 23	5:00 pm	No. 3 Nebraska*	Hubert H. Humphrey Metrodome; Minneapolis, MN		L 0–48	58,368	
September 30	1:30 pm	Indiana State*	Hubert H. Humphrey Metrodome; Minneapolis, MN		W 34–14	34,280	
October 7	1:30 pm	Purdue^{†}	Hubert H. Humphrey Metrodome; Minneapolis, MN		W 35–15	36,621	
October 14	1:00 pm	at Northwestern	Dyche Stadium; Evanston, IL		W 20–18	26,899	
October 21	1:00 pm	at Indiana	Memorial Stadium; Bloomington, IN		L 18–28	51,069	
October 28	2:30 pm	Ohio State	Hubert H. Humphrey Metrodome; Minneapolis, MN	ABC	L 37–41	33,945	
November 4	1:30 pm	Wisconsin	Hubert H. Humphrey Metrodome; Minneapolis, MN (rivalry)		W 24–22	39,325	
November 11	12:00 pm	at Michigan State	Spartan Stadium; East Lansing, MI		L 7–21	73,259	
November 18	11:30 am	No. 3 Michigan	Hubert H. Humphrey Metrodome; Minneapolis, MN (Little Brown Jug)	ESPN	L 15–49	35,103	
November 25	1:05 pm	at Iowa	Kinnick Stadium; Iowa City, IA (rivalry)		W 43–7	67,700	
*Non-conference game; ^{†}Homecoming; Rankings from AP Poll released prior to the game; All times are in Central time

== Game summaries ==
=== Purdue ===
Purdue Boilermakers (1–2) at Minnesota Golden Gophers (2–1)

Quarter	1	2	3	4	Total
Purdue	0	3	0	12	15
Minnesota	7	7	14	7	35

at Hubert H. Humphrey Metrodome, Minneapolis, Minnesota

- Date: October 7, 1989
- Game weather: Indoors (dome)
- Game attendance: 36,621
- Darrell Thompson injured right knee midway through first quarter and did not return

Team	Category	Player	Statistics
Purdue	Passing	Jeff Lesniewicz	13/19, 191 Yds, TD, INT
Purdue	Rushing		
Purdue	Receiving		
Minnesota	Passing	Scott Schaffner	9/19, 144 Yds, 2 TD
Minnesota	Rushing	Marcus Evans	102 Yds, TD
Minnesota	Receiving		

Scoring summary

Quarter	Time	Drive			Team	Scoring information	Score	
Quarter	Time	Plays	Yards	TOP	Team	Scoring information	PUR	MINN
1					Minnesota	Darrell Thompson 7-yard touchdown run, kick good	0	7
2					Purdue	51-yard field goal by Larry Sullivan	3	7
2	4:16		84		Minnesota	Marcus Evans 2-yard touchdown run, kick good	3	14
3		2			Minnesota	James King 34-yard touchdown reception from Scott Schaffner, kick good	3	21
3					Minnesota	Shane Strain 32-yard touchdown reception from Scott Schaffner, kick good	3	28
4					Minnesota	Marquel Fleetwood 3-yard touchdown run, kick good	3	35
4	5:17				Purdue	Jerome Sparkman 20-yard touchdown run, 2-point conversion failed	9	35
4	0:00				Purdue	Rod Dennis 37-yard touchdown reception from Jeff Lesniewicz, 2-point conversion failed	15	35
"TOP" = time of possession. For other American football terms, see Glossary of American football.							15	35

=== Ohio State ===
Ohio State Buckeyes (4–2) at Minnesota Golden Gophers (4–2)

Quarter	1	2	3	4	Total
Ohio St	0	8	10	23	41
Minnesota	17	14	0	6	37

at Hubert H. Humphrey Metrodome, Minneapolis, Minnesota

- Date: October 28
- Game time: 2:30 p.m.
- Game weather: Indoors (dome)
- Game attendance: 33,945
- Referee: Jerry Hendrickson
- Box Score

Game information

First quarter

- MINN – Darrell Thompson 12-yard run (Brent Berglund kick), 12:11. Minnesota 7–0. Drive: 4 plays, 28 yards, 1:18.
- MINN – Brent Berglund 30-yard field goal, 4:17. Minnesota 10–0. Drive: 6 plays, 9 yards, 3:00.
- MINN – Sean Lumpkin 85-yard fumble return (Brent Berglund kick), 3:07. Minnesota 17–0.

Second quarter

- MINN – Steve Rhem 29-yard pass from Scott Schaffner (Brent Berglund kick), 9:50. Minnesota 24–0. Drive: 4 plays, 73 yards, 1:40.
- MINN – Chris Gaiters 5-yard pass from Scott Schaffner (Brent Berglund kick), 4:29. Minnesota 31–0. Drive: 9 plays, 44 yards, 3:36.
- OSU – Carlos Snow 1-yard run (pass good), 0:10. Minnesota 31–8. Drive: 10 plays, 80 yards, 4:19.

Third quarter

- OSU – Pat O'Morrow 25-yard field goal, 10:04. Minnesota 31–11. Drive: 11 plays, 66 yards, 4:56.
- OSU – Carlos Snow 15-yard pass from Greg Frey (Pat O'Morrow kick), 0:20. Minnesota 31–18. Drive: 11 plays, 98 yards, 4:52.

Fourth quarter

- MINN – Brent Berglund 32-yard field goal, 11:24. Minnesota 34–18. Drive: 9 plays, 37 yards, 3:56.
- OSU – Carlos Snow 27-yard pass from Greg Frey (pass good), 9:51. Minnesota 34–26. Drive: 4 plays, 46 yards, 1:33.
- MINN – Brent Berglund 42-yard field goal, 5:15. Minnesota 37–26. Drive: 4 plays, 4 yards, 2:10.
- OSU – Greg Frey 1-yard run (pass good), 3:04. Minnesota 37–34. Drive: 8 plays, 68 yards, 2:11.
- OSU – Jeff Graham 15-yard pass from Greg Frey (Pat O'Morrow kick), 0:51. Ohio St 41–37. Drive: 5 plays, 73 yards, 1:01.

Top passers

- OSU – Greg Frey – 20/31, 362 yards, 3 TD, INT
- MINN – Scott Schaffner – 13/18, 154 yards, 2 TD

Top rushers

- OSU – Carlos Snow – 23 rushes, 74 yards, TD
- MINN – Darrell Thompson – 29 rushes, 133 yards, TD

Top receivers

- OSU – Jeff Graham – 6 receptions, 104 yards, TD
- MINN – Steve Rhem – 3 receptions, 43 yards, TD

=== Wisconsin ===
Wisconsin Badgers (2–5) at Minnesota Golden Gophers (4–3)

Quarter	1	2	Total
Wisconsin	7	15	22
Minnesota	10	14	24

- Date: November 4, 1989
- Game time: 2:30 p.m. EDT
- Game weather: Indoors (dome)
- Game attendance: 39,325

Team	Category	Player	Statistics
Wisconsin	Passing		
Wisconsin	Rushing	Robert Williams	21 Rush, 129 Yds, TD
Wisconsin	Receiving		
Minnesota	Passing		
Minnesota	Rushing	Darrell Thompson	32 Rush, 143 Yds, TD
Minnesota	Receiving		

Scoring summary

Quarter	Time	Drive			Team	Scoring information	Score	
Quarter	Time	Plays	Yards	TOP	Team	Scoring information	WISC	MINN
1	10:20	11	86		Minnesota	Darrell Thompson 1-yard touchdown run, Brent Berglund kick good	0	7
2	0:38				Wisconsin	Lionell Crawford 2-yard touchdown run, kick good	7	7
2	0:00				Minnesota	39-yard field goal by Bert Berglund	7	10
					Wisconsin	Touchdown	14	10
					Minnesota	Chris Gaiters 17-yard touchdown reception from Scott Schaffner, Bert Berglund kick good	14	17
					Minnesota	Interception returned 73 yards for touchdown by Ron Goetz, Bert Berglund kick good	14	24
			80		Wisconsin	Robert Williams 6-yard touchdown run, 2-point run good	22	24
"TOP" = time of possession. For other American football terms, see Glossary of American football.							22	24

=== Michigan ===
#3 Michigan Wolverines (8–1) at Minnesota Golden Gophers (5–4)

Quarter	1	2	3	4	Total
Michigan	0	28	7	14	49
Minnesota	7	0	8	0	15

at Hubert H. Humphrey Metrodome, Minneapolis, Minnesota

- Date: November 18, 1989
- Game time: 11:30 a.m. CDT
- Game weather: Indoors (dome)
- Game attendance: 35,103
- Referee: Jerry Hendrickson
- TV: ESPN
- Box Score

Team	Category	Player	Statistics
Michigan	Passing	Michael Taylor	12/16, 231 Yds, 4 TD
Michigan	Rushing	Leroy Hoard	11 Rush, 90 Yds, TD
Michigan	Receiving	Greg McMurtry	7 Rec, 165 Yds, 3 TD
Minnesota	Passing	Marquel Fleetwood	11/23, 100 Yds, 2 INT
Minnesota	Rushing	Darrell Thompson	18 Rush, 50 Yds, TD
Minnesota	Receiving	Pat Tinglehoff	7 Rec, 77 Yds

Scoring summary

Quarter	Time	Drive			Team	Scoring information	Score	
Quarter	Time	Plays	Yards	TOP	Team	Scoring information	MICH	MINN
1	10:08	12	76	4:52	Minnesota	Darrell Thompson 1-yard touchdown run, Brent Berglund kick good	0	7
2	9:24	7	88	3:23	Michigan	Greg McMurtry 34-yard touchdown reception from Michael Taylor, J.D. Carlson kick good	7	7
2	4:14	5	59	1:43	Michigan	Greg McMurtry 34-yard touchdown reception from Michael Taylor, J.D. Carlson kick good	14	7
2	2:06	1	44	0:15	Michigan	Leroy Hoard 29-yard touchdown run, J.D. Carlson kick good	21	7
2	0:45	3	75	0:23	Michigan	Greg McMurtry 25-yard touchdown reception from Michael Taylor, J.D. Carlson kick good	28	7
3	9:48	10	77	5:12	Michigan	Allen Jefferson 3-yard touchdown reception from Michael Taylor, J.D. Carlson kick good	35	7
3	0:00	10	36	5:10	Minnesota	Marquel Fleetwood 2-yard touchdown run, 2-point run good	35	15
4	11:03	8	80	3:57	Michigan	Allen Jefferson 15-yard touchdown run, J.D. Carlson kick good	42	15
4	3:43	6	60	3:07	Michigan	Desmond Howard 19-yard touchdown reception from Elvis Grbac, Gulam Khan kick good	49	15
"TOP" = time of possession. For other American football terms, see Glossary of American football.							49	15

=== At Iowa ===
Minnesota Golden Gophers (5–5) at Iowa Hawkeyes (5–5)

Quarter	1	2	3	4	Total
Minnesota	7			30	37
Iowa	0	0	7	0	7

at Kinnick Stadium, Iowa City, Iowa

- Date: November 25, 1989
- Game time: 1:05 p.m. CDT
- Game attendance: 67,700
- TV: None
- First win versus Iowa since 1984
- Biggest win versus Iowa since 1949

Team	Category	Player	Statistics
Minnesota	Passing		
Minnesota	Rushing	Darrell Thompson	122 Yds
Minnesota	Receiving		
Iowa	Passing		
Iowa	Rushing	Nick Bell	19 Rush, 133 Yds
Iowa	Receiving		

Scoring summary

Quarter	Time	Drive			Team	Scoring information	Score	
Quarter	Time	Plays	Yards	TOP	Team	Scoring information	MINN	IOWA
1					Minnesota	Chris Gaiters 14-yard touchdown reception from Darrell Thompson, Brent Berglund kick good	7	0
3					Iowa	Mike Saunders 12-yard touchdown reception from Matt Rodgers, kick good		7
4					Minnesota	Marquel Fleetwood 22-yard touchdown run, 2-point pass failed	19	7
4					Minnesota	39-yard field goal by Brent Berglund	22	7
4	8:45				Minnesota	Interception returned 30 yards for touchdown by Eddie Miles, kick good	29	7
4	4:42				Minnesota	James King 5-yard touchdown run, kick good	36	7
4		4			Minnesota	Marcus Evans 1-yard touchdown run, kick good	43	7
"TOP" = time of possession. For other American football terms, see Glossary of American football.							43	7

== Personnel ==
1989 Minnesota Golden Gophers football team roster
Players
Coaches
Offense

Pos.	#	Name	Class
RB	42	Patrick Cummings	Sr
G	74	Mark Drabczak	Jr
RB	7	Marcus Evans	Jr
QB	14	Marquel Fleetwood	Fr
WR	2	Chris Gaiters	Sr
WR	19	Kevin Grant	Jr
OL	58	Craig Hendrickson	Jr
WR	85	Paul Hopewell	So
RB	22	James King	So
OL	67	J.J. Lennon	Sr
OL		Dan Liimatta
OT	65	Jon Melander	Sr
FB	34	Rick Meyer	So
WR	48	Steve Rhem	Fr
QB	10	Jeff Rosga	Fr
QB	15	Scott Schaffner	So
RB	31	Al Settembrino	So
RB	33	Tyrone Stenzel	Sr
TE	89	Shane Strain	Sr
OL	60	Chris Thorne	Jr
RB	39	Darrell Thompson	Sr
WR	86	Pat Tinglehoff	Jr
TE	84	Trey Whitson	Fr

Defense

Pos.	#	Name	Class
DL	80	Skeeter Akre	Jr
DL	95	Anthony Bryant	So
DL	51	Bob Coughlin	Jr
DB	13	Derek Fisher	Fr
DB	4	Fred Foggie	Jr
LB	37	Ron Goetz	Sr
DB	45	Frank Jackson	Jr
OL	56	Jon Leverenz	Sr
DB	26	Sean Lumpkin	So
DL	28	Eddie Miles	Sr
DB	6	Les O'Hara	Jr
FS	25	Matt Sheldon	So
LB	55	Joel Staats	So
LB	94	Mac Stephens	Sr
DL	79	Mike Sunvold	Jr
DB	1	Andre Thaddies	So

Special teams

Pos.	#	Name	Class
K	3	Brent Berglund	Jr
P		Brent Herbel

Head coach

- John Gutekunst

Coordinators/assistant coaches

Legend

- (C) Team captain
- (S) Suspended
- (I) Ineligible
- Injured
- Redshirt

Roster
