= List of Towson Tigers in the NFL draft =

This is a list of Towson Tigers players in the NFL draft.

== Key ==
B	Back	K	Kicker	NT	Nose tackle
C	Center	LB	Linebacker	FB	Fullback
DB	Defensive back	P	Punter	HB	Halfback
DE	Defensive end	QB	Quarterback	WR	Wide receiver
DT	Defensive tackle	RB	Running back	G	Guard
E	End	T	Offensive tackle	TE	Tight end

= Pro Bowler
= Hall of Famer

== Selections ==
Year	Round	Pick	Overall	Player	Team	Position
1980	12	6	311	Randy Bielski	Baltimore Colts	K
1989	5	20	132	Dave Meggett	New York Giants	RB
1994	5	29	160	Tony Vinson	San Diego Chargers	RB
2007	4	26	125	Jermon Bushrod	New Orleans Saints	OT
2014	3	30	94	Terrance West	Cleveland Browns	RB
2015	5	34	170	Tye Smith	Seattle Seahawks	DB
