= Bobby Olive =

American football player (born 1969)

No. 1, 16, 18, 88
- Position: Wide receiver

Personal information
- Born: April 22, 1969 (age 57); Paris, Tennessee, U.S.
- Listed height: 6 ft 0 in (1.83 m)
- Listed weight: 167 lb (76 kg)

Career information
- High school: Frederick Douglass (Atlanta, Georgia)
- College: Ohio State
- NFL draft: 1991: 11th round, 300th overall pick

Career history

Playing
- Kansas City Chiefs (1991)*; Atlanta Falcons (1992)*; Cleveland Browns (1994)*; Washington Redskins (1995)*; Frankfurt Galaxy (1995); Indianapolis Colts (1995–1996); Washington Redskins (1997)*; Hamilton Tiger-Cats (1998); Buffalo Destroyers (1999–2002); Carolina Cobras (2002); Columbus Destroyers (2005)
- * Offseason or practice squad member only

Coaching
- Frisco Fighters (2021) Wide receivers coach

Career AFL statistics
- Receptions: 202
- Receiving yards: 2,125
- Touchdowns: 26
- Stats at ArenaFan.com
- Stats at Pro Football Reference

Bobby Lee Olive Jr. (born April 22, 1969) is an American former professional football player who was a wide receiver for the Indianapolis Colts of the National Football League (NFL). He played college football for the Ohio State Buckeyes and was selected by the Kansas City Chiefs in the eleventh round of the 1991 NFL draft. He also played in the Arena Football League (AFL) for the Buffalo Destroyers/Columbus Destroyers and Carolina Cobras and in the Canadian Football League (CFL) for the Hamilton Tiger-Cats.

In December 2019, it was announced that Olive would be the inaugural head coach of the Columbus Wild Dogs, an Indoor Football League team in Columbus, Ohio, that was announced to begin play in the 2021 season. The team did not launch as scheduled and by December 2021, Olive and Wild Dogs management announced they had cut ties with the team's owners.
