= Howard Griffith =

American football player (born 1968)

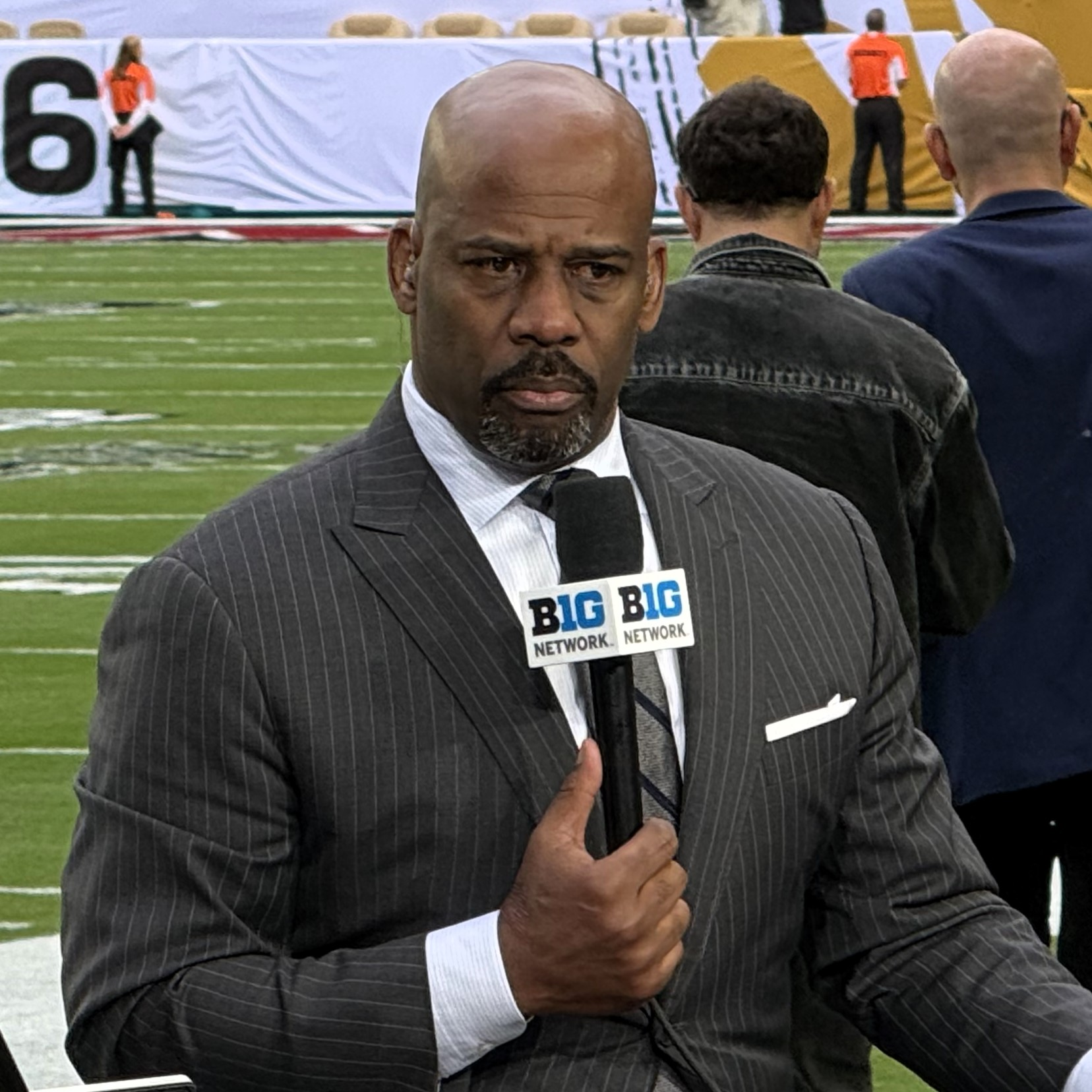
- Griffith doing a broadcast in 2026

No. 30, 29
- Position: Fullback

Personal information
- Born: November 17, 1968 (age 57); Chicago, Illinois, U.S.
- Listed height: 6 ft 0 in (1.83 m)
- Listed weight: 230 lb (104 kg)

Career information
- High school: Julian (Chicago, Illinois)
- College: Illinois
- NFL draft: 1991: 9th round, 236th overall pick
- Expansion draft: 1995: 8th round, 16th overall pick

Career history
- Indianapolis Colts (1991)*; Buffalo Bills (1991–1992)*; San Diego Chargers (1992–1993)*; Los Angeles Rams (1993–1994); Carolina Panthers (1995–1996); Denver Broncos (1997–2000)
- * Offseason or practice squad member only

Awards and highlights
- 2× Super Bowl champion (XXXII, XXXIII); Second-team All-Big Ten (1990)

Career NFL statistics
- Rushing yards: 351
- Rushing average: 2.9
- Receptions: 122
- Receiving yards: 844
- Total touchdowns: 12
- Stats at Pro Football Reference

Howard Griffith (born November 17, 1968) is an American former professional football player who was a fullback for 11 seasons in the National Football League (NFL) from 1991 to 2001.

== Early life ==
Raised in Chicago, Griffith attended now defunct Mendel Catholic Prep High School of the Chicago Catholic League until his sophomore year. For his junior year, he transferred to Julian High School, where he was an All-City performer.

== College career ==
While playing college football for the Illinois Fighting Illini, Griffith set the NCAA single-game record for touchdowns with eight. It occurred on September 22, 1990, against Southern Illinois University in a 56–21 Illinois win.

== Professional career ==
Griffith was selected in the ninth round of the 1991 NFL draft by the Indianapolis Colts, but never played a regular-season game for the Colts. Griffith made his NFL debut with the Los Angeles Rams in 1993. He played two seasons with the Rams, and then played two seasons with the Carolina Panthers after being selected in the 1995 NFL expansion draft.

In 1997, Griffith joined the Denver Broncos, and played five seasons for the Broncos primarily as a blocking back for Terrell Davis. He didn't get very many rushing attempts, but was often used as a receiver out of the backfield, recording 27 receptions in 1996 and 26 in 1999. With the Broncos, Griffith won two Super Bowl rings in Super Bowl XXXII and Super Bowl XXXIII. Griffith was a big contributor in the Broncos Super Bowl XXXIII win, scoring two rushing touchdowns in the game. He also made a key 23-yard reception in the final quarter of Super Bowl XXXII, setting up Denver's final touchdown of the game. While playing for the Broncos, Howard earned the nickname "the Human Plow" due to his successful blocking for Davis.

Griffith retired from the NFL at the start of the 2002 season, due to a neck injury sustained in the 2001 preseason that caused him to miss the entire 2001 campaign. His final totals over his 11 NFL seasons include 351 rushing yards and three touchdowns, along with 122 receptions for 844 yards and nine touchdowns.

== Broadcasting and author ==
Griffith currently works as a football analyst. He is one of the lead in-studio analysts for the Big Ten Network, giving his weekly analysis of Big 10 football. In 2005, he was an analyst for the NFL and NFL Europe football leagues, as he commentated games that were broadcast by Fox and the NFL Networks. He is the author of the 2001 book Laying it on the Line.

His son Houston committed to Notre Dame in 2018.
