= Anthony Thompson (running back) =

American football player (born 1967)

No. 34, 32
- Position: Running back

Personal information
- Born: April 8, 1967 (age 59); Terre Haute, Indiana, U.S.
- Listed height: 5 ft 11 in (1.80 m)
- Listed weight: 207 lb (94 kg)

Career information
- High school: Terre Haute North Vigo
- College: Indiana (1986–1989)
- NFL draft: 1990: 2nd round, 31st overall pick

Career history
- Phoenix Cardinals (1990–1992); Los Angeles Rams (1992–1993); San Francisco 49ers (1994)*
- * Offseason or practice squad member only

Awards and highlights
- Maxwell Award (1989); Walter Camp Award (1989); Chic Harley Award (1989); Unanimous All-American (1989); Consensus All-American (1988); Big Ten Male Athlete of the Year (1990); 2× Big Ten Most Valuable Player (1988, 1989); 2× Big Ten Player of the Year (1988, 1989); 2× First-team All-Big Ten (1988, 1989); Second-team All-Big Ten (1987); Indiana Hoosiers No. 32 retired

Career NFL statistics
- Rushing yards: 831
- Rushing average: 3.3
- Rushing touchdowns: 6
- Receptions: 14
- Receiving yards: 74
- Stats at Pro Football Reference
- College Football Hall of Fame

Anthony Q. Thompson (born April 8, 1967) is an American former professional football player who was a running back in the National Football League (NFL). He played college football for the Indiana Hoosiers and was selected in the second round by the Phoenix Cardinals in the 1990 NFL draft. Thompson also played for the Los Angeles Rams. He later became a pastor at the Lighthouse Community Church in Bloomington, Indiana.

== Early life ==
Thompson was a three-year starter (1983–1985) for Terre Haute North Vigo High School, where he was a Parade All-American under coach Wayne Stahley.

== College career ==
Thompson played college football for the Hoosiers at Indiana University Bloomington , where he won the Maxwell Award and Walter Camp Award in 1989. He also won the Chicago Tribune Silver Football twice, becoming only the third person to do so at the time (following Paul Giel and Archie Griffin). Thompson finished second in Heisman Trophy voting for the 1989 season. In 1989, he broke the record for career touchdowns in college with 65 touchdowns. The record stood until 1998 when it was broken by Ricky Williams. Thompson finished his college career with 5,299 rushing yards. In 2007, Thompson was inducted into the College Football Hall of Fame.

=== Statistics ===
Year		Rushing					Receiving			Kickoff Returns			
Year		Att	Yards	Avg	Yds/G	TD	Rec	Yards	TD	Att	Yards	Avg	TD
1986	Indiana	191	806	4.2	67.2	5	10	79	0	1	18	18.0	0
1987	Indiana	257	1,014	3.9	84.5	12	26	242	0	0	0	--	0
1988	Indiana	355	1,686	4.7	140.5	26	31	233	0	0	0	--	0
1989	Indiana	358	1,793	5.0	163.0	24	35	201	1	18	394	21.9	0
Totals		1,161	5,299	4.6	112.7	67	102	755	1	19	412	21.7	0

== Professional career ==
Pre-draft measurables
Height	Weight	Arm length	Hand span	40-yard dash	10-yard split	20-yard split	Vertical jump	Bench press
5 ft 11 1/8 in (1.81 m)	207 lb (94 kg)	29 1/2 in (0.75 m)	9 7/8 in (0.25 m)	4.77 s	1.65 s	2.79 s	33.5 in (0.85 m)	24 reps

Thompson was selected by the Phoenix Cardinals in the second round of the 1990 NFL draft with the 31st overall pick. During his NFL career, which ended in 1992 with the Los Angeles Rams, he played in 37 games and scored six touchdowns.

== Personal life ==
Thompson has four children: two daughters, Teka and Ciara, and two sons, Anthony Jr. and Jacob.

== See also ==
- List of NCAA Division I FBS running backs with at least 50 career rushing touchdowns
- List of NCAA major college football yearly rushing leaders
- List of NCAA major college football yearly scoring leaders
