= Tony Vinson (American football) =

German gridiron football player (born 1971)

No. 35, 44
- Position: Fullback

Personal information
- Born: March 13, 1971 (age 55); Frankfurt, Germany
- Listed height: 6 ft 1 in (1.85 m)
- Listed weight: 229 lb (104 kg)

Career information
- High school: Denbigh (Newport News, Virginia, U.S.)
- College: Purdue, Towson
- NFL draft: 1994: 5th round, 160th overall pick

Career history
- San Diego Chargers (1994)*; Atlanta Falcons (1995)*; London Monarchs (1996–1997); Baltimore Ravens (1997–1999)
- * Offseason or practice squad member only

Career NFL statistics
- Games played: 16
- Stats at Pro Football Reference

Anthony Cho Vinson (born March 13, 1971) is a former American football fullback. He was selected in the fifth round of the 1994 NFL draft. He played for the Baltimore Ravens in 1997 and 1999.
