= Scottie Graham =

American football player, coach, and administrator (born 1969)

Washington Huskies
- Title: Running backs coach

Personal information
- Born: March 28, 1969 (age 57); Long Beach, New York, U.S.
- Listed height: 5 ft 8 in (1.73 m)
- Listed weight: 217 lb (98 kg)

Career information
- High school: Long Beach (NY)
- College: Ohio State
- NFL draft: 1992: 7th round, 188th overall pick

Career history

Playing
- Pittsburgh Steelers (1992)*; New York Jets (1992); Minnesota Vikings (1993–1996); Cincinnati Bengals (1997); Minnesota Vikings (1998)*
- * Offseason or practice squad member only

Coaching
- Arizona (2021–2023) Running backs coach; Washington (2024–present) Running backs coach

Operations
- Arizona State (2014–2020) Associate athletic director

Career NFL statistics
- Rushing yards: 1,267
- Rushing average: 3.5
- Rushing touchdowns: 7
- Stats at Pro Football Reference

James Otis Graham, better known as Scottie, (born March 28, 1969) is an American former professional football player who played running back for six seasons in the National Football League (NFL) with the New York Jets (1992), the Minnesota Vikings (1993–1996), and the Cincinnati Bengals (1997). He is the current running backs coach for the Washington Huskies after serving in the same position at Arizona.

== College career ==
Graham attended Long Beach High School in Long Beach, New York, where he was a high school All-American in three sports: football, wrestling and lacrosse. He continued his football career with a full scholarship to Ohio State University, lettering four years and starting three years as running back. In his senior year, Graham was elected team captain by his peers. He was drafted by the Steelers in the seventh round of the 1992 NFL Draft.

Graham continued his graduate studies during the off-season and received his master's degree in Black Studies at Ohio State during his fourth year with the Minnesota Vikings.

== Professional career ==
Pre-draft measurables
Height	Weight	Arm length	Hand span	40-yard dash	10-yard split	20-yard split	20-yard shuttle	Vertical jump	Broad jump	Bench press
5 ft 8 3/8 in (1.74 m)	222 lb (101 kg)	30 5/8 in (0.78 m)	8 5/8 in (0.22 m)	4.65 s	1.64 s	2.65 s	4.22 s	33.5 in (0.85 m)	9 ft 5 in (2.87 m)	25 reps

Graham played six seasons in the NFL with two teams - the New York Jets and the Minnesota Vikings. He amassed 1,247 rushing yards for his career, all without committing a single fumble across those six seasons. Graham received the Ed Block Courage Award for his exhibition of sportsmanship in 1996.

In 1993, Graham climbed through the ranks of the Vikings depth chart as a running back, finishing the season as Minnesota's leading rusher. By the end of December 1993, his 448 yards placed him 16th in the NFC with zero fumbles.

In one two-game stretch, he rushed for 139 yards against the Green Bay Packers and the following week, rushed for 166 yards against the Kansas City Chiefs. These 305 total rushing yards during two games were the most ever by a Viking running back in a two-game stretch. His effort would help ensure the Vikings reached the NFC Playoffs, the second of three straight appearances, in 1993.

== Sports administration ==
Graham spent 15 years with the NFL Players Association in Washington, D.C. He began his career as a Regional Director with the trade association; later, he moved to the commercial subsidiary NFL PLAYERS to directly engage players with business partners, as the Director of Player Marketing and Engagement.

From 2014 to 2020, Graham served as Senior Associate Athletic Director for Student-Athlete Development and Welfare at Arizona State. The role made Graham the lead administrator for student-athlete development and welfare.

== Assistant coach ==
Starting in 2021, Graham returned to the football field as an assistant coach in charge of running backs under Jedd Fisch for the Arizona Wildcats. Within three seasons, the Wildcats transformed from a one-win team to a third-place team in the PAC-12 Conference that earned an Alamo Bowl invitation in 2023.
