= Darrell Thompson =

American football player (born 1967)

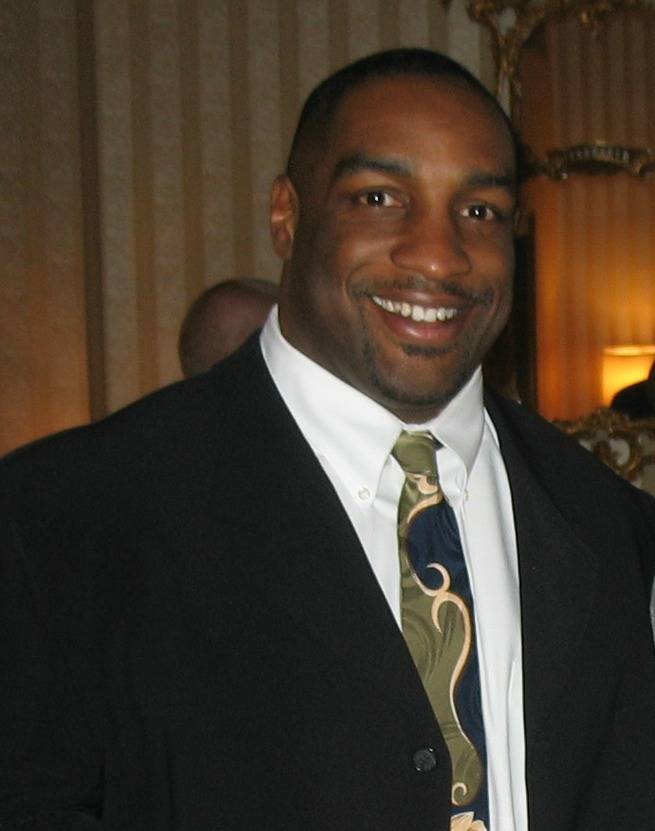

No. 39, 26
- Position: Running back

Personal information
- Born: November 23, 1967 (age 58); St. Louis, Missouri, U.S.
- Listed height: 6 ft 0 in (1.83 m)
- Listed weight: 215 lb (98 kg)

Career information
- High school: John Marshall (Rochester, Minnesota)
- College: Minnesota
- NFL draft: 1990: 1st round, 19th overall pick

Career history
- Green Bay Packers (1990–1994); Chicago Bears (1995)*
- * Offseason or practice squad member only

Awards and highlights
- First-team All-Big Ten (1986); 2× Second-team All-Big Ten (1987, 1989); Big Ten Freshman of the Year (1986)

Career NFL statistics
- Games played: 60
- Games started: 28
- Rushing attempts-yards: 464-1,641
- Receptions-yards: 41-330
- Touchdowns: 9
- Stats at Pro Football Reference

Darrell Alexander Thompson (born November 23, 1967) is an American former professional football player who was a running back for five seasons with the Green Bay Packers of the National Football League (NFL). He played college football for the Minnesota Golden Gophers and was selected by Green Bay in the first round of the 1990 NFL draft with the 19th overall pick.

== Early life ==
Thompson was born in St. Louis, Missouri to George and Morsie Thompson and is the oldest of three children. Thompson comes from an athletic family; both his siblings, George Jr. and Jennifer, played collegiate volleyball, and George Thompson is the nephew of Alice Coachman, the first black woman to win an Olympic gold medal. When Darrell was one year old, the family relocated to Rochester, Minnesota.

At John Marshall High School Thompson was a three sport standout where he was all-state in track & field, a McDonald's all-American in basketball and a Gatorade all-American in football. As a three-year player, Thompson became one of the most decorated and sought after running backs in the nation. After graduating from high school he decided to play college football for the Minnesota Golden Gophers over Nebraska, Iowa, Wisconsin, UCLA, Oklahoma and Oklahoma State.

== College career ==
While at Minnesota, he was the starting running back for all four years and became the first Big Ten running back to rush for more than 1,000 yards as a freshman and as a sophomore, including a then-record 1,240 yards as a freshman. He finished his career as the university's all-time leader in career rushing yards, attempts, all-purpose yards, touchdowns and holds the record for longest run from scrimmage at 98 yards. He was then selected by the Green Bay Packers in the first round of the 1990 NFL draft in April 1990.

			Rushing statistics				Receiving statistics			
Year	Team	G	Att	Yards	Avg	TD	Rec	Yards	Avg	TD
1986*	Minnesota	11	217	1240	5.7	8	21	198	9.4	3
1987*	Minnesota	11	224	1229	5.5	13	6	39	6.5	0
1988*	Minnesota	11	210	910	4.3	9	10	49	4.9	0
1989	Minnesota	11	260	1139	4.4	10	10	51	5.1	0
College totals		44	911	4518	5.0	40	47	337	7.2	3

*indicates bowl stats included

== Professional career ==
During his NFL career, Thompson played in 60 games as a fullback and tailback for the Green Bay Packers. During his five seasons he gained 1,640 yards rushing, 330 yards receiving, and scored 8 touchdowns. Thompson played alongside Brett Favre, Reggie White, LeRoy Butler and Sterling Sharpe.

=== NFL statistics ===
Rushing

Year	Team	G	Att	Yards	Avg	TD	Long	1st downs	Fum
1990	GB	16	76	264	3.5	1	37	0	0
1991	GB	13	141	471	3.3	1	40	24	0
1992	GB	7	76	254	3.3	2	33	17	2
1993	GB	16	169	654	3.9	3	60	30	2
1994	GB	8	2	-2	-1.0	0	2	0	0
Career		60	464	1641	3.5	7	60	71	4

Receiving

Year	Team	G	Rec	Yards	Avg	TD	Long	1st downs	Fum
1990	GB	16	3	1	0.3	0	1	0	0
1991	GB	13	7	71	10.1	0	18	2	0
1992	GB	7	13	129	9.9	1	43	7	0
1993	GB	16	18	129	7.1	0	34	6	0
Career		60	41	330	8.0	1	43	15	0

Kickoff Returns

Year	Team	G	Att	Yards	TD	Long
1990	GB	16	3	103	1	76
1991	GB	13	7	127	0	30
1993	GB	16	9	171	0	42
1994	GB	8	4	67	0	19
Career		60	23	468	1	76

== Post NFL career ==
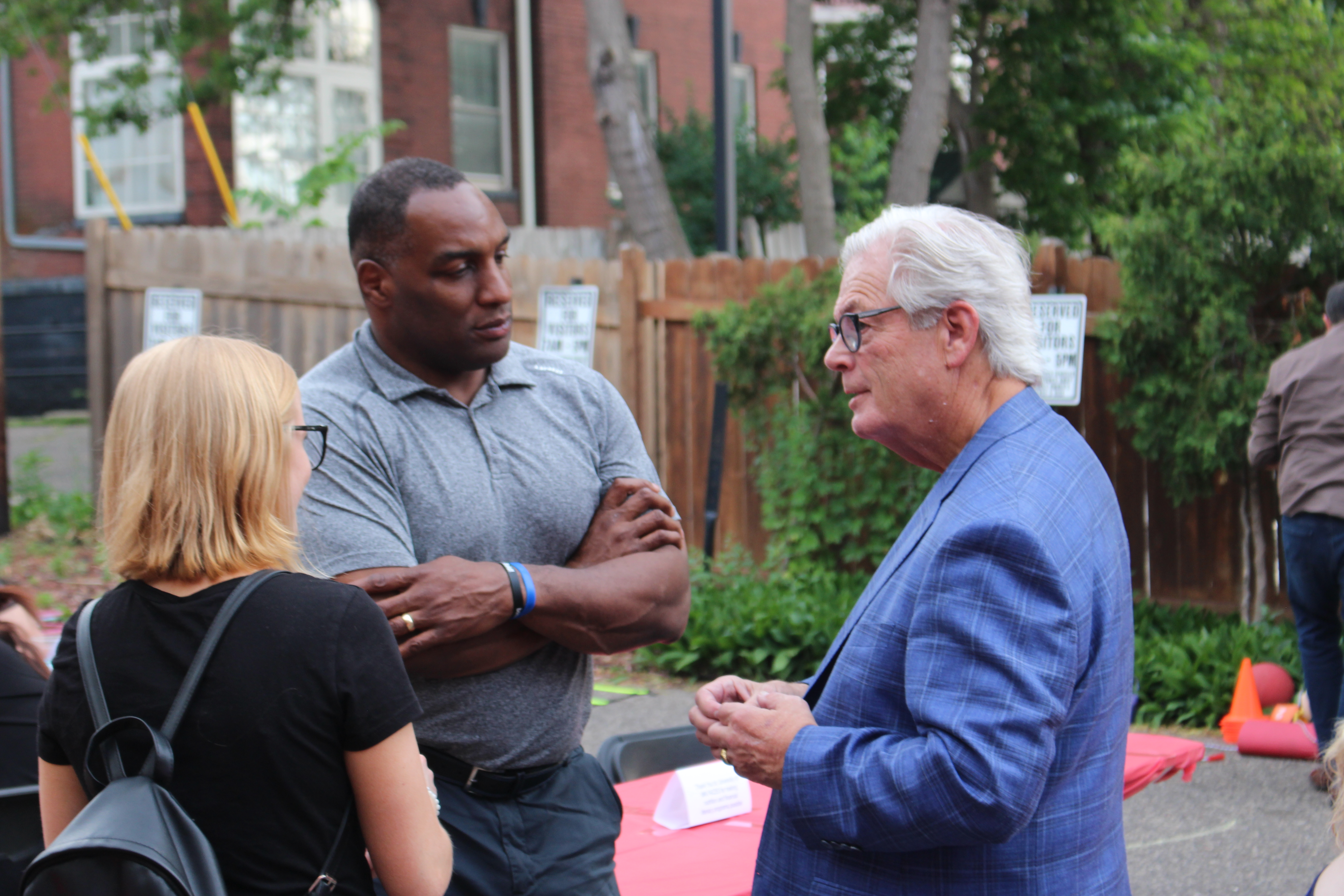
Darrell Thompson speaks with supporters of Bolder Options in June 2019

Thompson is the president and CEO of Bolder Options, a youth mentoring nonprofit organization that serves youth in Minneapolis, St. Paul and Rochester. Both Thompson and Bolder Options were featured on The Today Show with Al Roker in 2006 as part of Roker's charity tour.

In 1997 Thompson was selected into the Gophers Hall of Fame, and later became a sideline reporter for the Gophers. He has served as the Minnesota Gopher football radio color commentator since 1998.

== Personal life ==
Thompson married Stephanie Smith in 1995. The couple currently resides in Plymouth, Minnesota and have four children. Their oldest daughter, Dominique, played collegiate volleyball at University of Wisconsin–Madison and then professionally in Denmark for the 2015–2016 season. Their other daughter, Indigo, played collegiate volleyball at San Diego State University. Their oldest son, True, played football collegiately at the University of Minnesota and their youngest son, Race, played basketball at Indiana University.
