= Carlos Snow =

American football player (born 1968)

Carlos Snow (born October 24, 1968) is a former American football tailback, starting in college for the Ohio State Buckeyes.

== Biography ==
Snow was a 5-foot-8, 195-pound speedster who attended the now-defunct Cincinnati Academy of Physical Education. In his four seasons, he led the Crusaders to a 45–3 record and state championships in 1985 and 1986, his final two years of high school.

He ran for more than 2,000 yards in three straight seasons and also showed prowess on defense.

Signing with the Ohio State University, Snow battled through injuries (including hip surgery) to finish his career 6th on the all-time rushing list for the Buckeyes with 2,974 yards from 1987 to 1991.

In 2022, Snow got his degree from Ohio State University.
