= Jeff Graham =

American football player (born 1969)

No. 81
- Position: Wide receiver

Personal information
- Born: February 14, 1969 (age 57); Dayton, Ohio, U.S.
- Listed height: 6 ft 2 in (1.88 m)
- Listed weight: 200 lb (91 kg)

Career information
- High school: Archbishop Alter (Kettering, Ohio)
- College: Ohio State
- NFL draft: 1991: 2nd round, 46th overall pick

Career history
- Pittsburgh Steelers (1991–1993); Chicago Bears (1994–1995); New York Jets (1996–1997); Philadelphia Eagles (1998); San Diego Chargers (1999–2001); Atlanta Falcons (2002)*
- * Offseason or practice squad member only

Awards and highlights
- First-team All-Big Ten (1990)

Career NFL statistics
- Receptions: 542
- Receiving yards: 8,172
- Receiving touchdowns: 30
- Stats at Pro Football Reference

Jeffery Todd Graham (born February 14, 1969) is an American former professional football player who was a wide receiver in the National Football League (NFL). He was selected by the Pittsburgh Steelers in the second round of the 1991 NFL draft. Standing 6'2" and 206 lbs from Kettering, Archbishop Alter High School and Ohio State University, Graham played in 11 NFL seasons from 1991 to 2001 for the Steelers, the Chicago Bears, the New York Jets, the Philadelphia Eagles, and the San Diego Chargers.

Graham's best season as a professional came during the 1995 season with the Bears, when he had 82 receptions for 1,301 yards and four touchdowns. At Alter High School, Graham was a two-way starter in his sophomore, junior and senior years. He played wide receiver on offense and safety on defense. He played an important role in helping the Knights reach the 1984 State Semifinals. In his senior year he was moved to quarterback and was successful in running the wishbone offense for the Knights. Graham was a 1st Team All-State basketball player and had many scholarship offers from big-name schools.

== NFL career statistics ==
Legend
**Bold**	Career high

=== Regular season ===
Year	Team	Games		Receiving				
Year	Team	GP	GS	Rec	Yds	Avg	Lng	TD
1991	PIT	13	1	2	21	10.5	15	0
1992	PIT	14	10	49	711	14.5	51	1
1993	PIT	15	12	38	579	15.2	51	0
1994	CHI	**16**	15	68	944	13.9	76	4
1995	CHI	**16**	**16**	**82**	**1,301**	15.9	51	4
1996	NYJ	11	9	50	788	15.8	78	**6**
1997	NYJ	**16**	**16**	42	542	12.9	47	2
1998	PHI	15	15	47	600	12.8	45	2
1999	SDG	**16**	11	57	968	**17.0**	54	2
2000	SDG	14	13	55	907	16.5	**83**	4
2001	SDG	14	11	52	811	15.6	61	5
		160	129	542	8,172	15.1	83	30

=== Playoffs ===
Year	Team	Games		Receiving				
Year	Team	GP	GS	Rec	Yds	Avg	Lng	TD
1993	PIT	1	1	7	96	13.7	35	0
1994	CHI	**2**	**2**	**8**	**141**	**17.6**	**52**	**1**
		3	3	15	237	15.8	52	1

== Personal life ==
Graham's house was destroyed by a lightning storm on Thursday June 28, 2007. Graham is the uncle of former University of Michigan wide receiver Roy Roundtree. Graham coaches Division III high school football at Trotwood-Madison High School, in Ohio, where his team won the 2017–18 and 2019-20 state championship.
