= Greg Frey =

American football player and coach (born 1968)

No. 14
- Position: Quarterback

Personal information
- Born: January 29, 1968 (age 58); Cincinnati, Ohio, U.S.
- Listed height: 6 ft 2 in (1.88 m)
- Listed weight: 200 lb (91 kg)

Career information
- High school: St. Xavier (Cincinnati)
- College: Ohio State
- NFL draft: 1991: undrafted

Career history

Playing
- Ohio Glory (1992); Cleveland Thunderbolts (1993)

Coaching
- Bexley HS (OH) (2004–2006) Assistant; Pickerington HS North (OH) (2007–2008) Assistant

Awards and highlights
- 2× Second-team All-Big Ten (1989, 1990)

Career AFL statistics
- Passing TDs–INTs: 22–8
- Passing yards: 1,077
- Stats at ArenaFan.com

Greg Frey (born January 29, 1968) is an American former football player.

== Education ==
Frey is a 1986 graduate of St. Xavier High School in Cincinnati, where he played quarterback. As a three-year starting quarterback for the Ohio State Buckeyes, he led the team to two notable come-from-behind wins. On September 24, 1988, he rallied Ohio State from a 33–20 deficit in the final four minutes to a 36–33 victory over the ninth-ranked LSU Tigers. On October 28, 1989, the Buckeyes were losing 31–0 to the Minnesota Golden Gophers. Frey brought the team back for a 41–37 win, throwing a total of 362 yards.

== Professional career ==
Frey went on to play professional football for the Ohio Glory in the World League of American Football in 1992, and then in the original Arena Football League for the 1993 Cleveland Thunderbolts.

Frey later spent three years as the offensive coordinator for Pickerington High School North, engineering an offense that pushed the team closer to the postseason than any other team in Pickerington North history at that time. He currently offers private coaching services for high school quarterbacks. His best known client was Denver Broncos quarterback Brady Quinn.

A color analyst, Frey broadcast Fox Sports coverage of the AFL's Columbus Destroyers and now calls high school football games on the SportsTime Ohio television network.
