= 1989 Michigan Wolverines football team =

American college football season

1989 Michigan Wolverines football

Big Ten champion

Rose Bowl, L 10–17 vs. USC
- Conference: Big Ten Conference

Ranking
- Coaches: No. 8
- AP: No. 7
- Record: 10–2 (8–0 Big Ten)
- Head coach: Bo Schembechler (21st season)
- Offensive coordinator: Gary Moeller (3rd season)
- Defensive coordinator: Lloyd Carr (3rd season)
- MVP: Tony Boles
- Captains: J. J. Grant; Derrick Walker
- Home stadium: Michigan Stadium

1989 Big Ten Conference football standings
| | Conf. | | | | | Overall |
| Team | W | | L | | T | W | | L | | T |
|---|---|---|---|---|---|---|---|---|---|---|
| No. 7 Michigan $ | 8 | – | 0 | – | 0 | 10 | – | 2 | – | 0 |
| No. 10 Illinois | 7 | – | 1 | – | 0 | 10 | – | 2 | – | 0 |
| No. 16 Michigan State | 6 | – | 2 | – | 0 | 8 | – | 4 | – | 0 |
| No. 24 Ohio State | 6 | – | 2 | – | 0 | 8 | – | 4 | – | 0 |
| Minnesota | 4 | – | 4 | – | 0 | 6 | – | 5 | – | 0 |
| Indiana | 3 | – | 5 | – | 0 | 5 | – | 6 | – | 0 |
| Iowa | 3 | – | 5 | – | 0 | 5 | – | 6 | – | 0 |
| Purdue | 2 | – | 6 | – | 0 | 3 | – | 8 | – | 0 |
| Wisconsin | 1 | – | 7 | – | 0 | 2 | – | 9 | – | 0 |
| Northwestern | 0 | – | 8 | – | 0 | 0 | – | 11 | – | 0 |
$ – Conference champion; Rankings from AP Poll

The 1989 Michigan Wolverines football team was an American football team that represented the University of Michigan as a member of the Big Ten Conference during the 1989 NCAA Division I-A football season. In their 21st and final season under head coach Bo Schembechler, the Wolverines compiled a 10–2 record (8–0 in conference games), won the Big Ten championship, and outscored opponents by a total of 335 to 184. They lost to Notre Dame in the season opener and then won 10 consecutive regular season games before losing to USC in the 1990 Rose Bowl. The Wolverines were ranked No. 7 and No. 8, respectively, in the final AP and UPI polls. Prior to the Rose Bowl, Schembechler announced that he would retire after the Rose Bowl.

Quarterbacks Michael Taylor and Elvis Grbac passed for 966 and 824 yards, respectively. Tailback Tony Boles led the team in rushing with 839 yards, and split end Greg McMurtry led with 37 receptions for 655 yards. Placekicker J.D. Carlson was the leading scorer with 73 points, converting 36 of 39 extra points and 12 of 13 field goals. Defensive back Tripp Welborne was a consensus first-team selection on the 1989 All-America team. Six Michigan players received first-team honors on the 1989 All-Big Ten Conference football team.

== Schedule ==
| Date | Time | Opponent | Rank | Site | TV | Result | Attendance | Source |
|---|---|---|---|---|---|---|---|---|
| September 16 | 3:30 p.m. | No. 1 Notre Dame* | No. 2 | Michigan Stadium; Ann Arbor, MI (rivalry) | ABC | L 19–24 | 105,912 | |
| September 23 | 8:00 p.m. | at No. 24 UCLA* | No. 5 | Rose Bowl; Pasadena, CA | ABC | W 24–23 | 71,797 | |
| September 30 | 1:00 p.m. | Maryland* | No. 6 | Michigan Stadium; Ann Arbor, MI | | W 41–21 | 104,872 | |
| October 7 | 1:00 p.m. | Wisconsin | No. 5 | Michigan Stadium; Ann Arbor, MI | | W 24–0 | 104,097 | |
| October 14 | 3:30 p.m. | at No. 21 Michigan State | No. 5 | Spartan Stadium; East Lansing, MI (rivalry) | ABC | W 10–7 | 76,913 | |
| October 21 | 3:30 p.m. | at Iowa | No. 5 | Kinnick Stadium; Iowa City, IA | ABC | W 26–12 | 67,700 | |
| October 28 | 12:00 p.m. | Indiana^{†} | No. 5 | Michigan Stadium; Ann Arbor, MI | ABC | W 38–10 | 105,989 | |
| November 4 | 1:00 p.m. | Purdue | No. 4 | Michigan Stadium; Ann Arbor, MI | | W 42–27 | 105,128 | |
| November 11 | 3:30 p.m. | at No. 8 Illinois | No. 3 | Memorial Stadium; Champaign, IL (rivalry) | ABC | W 24–10 | 73,069 | |
| November 18 | 12:30 p.m. | at Minnesota | No. 3 | Hubert H. Humphrey Metrodome; Minneapolis, MN (Little Brown Jug) | ESPN | W 49–15 | 35,103 | |
| November 25 | 12:00 p.m. | No. 20 Ohio State | No. 3 | Michigan Stadium; Ann Arbor, MI (The Game) | ABC | W 28–18 | 106,137 | |
| January 1, 1990 | 4:45 p.m. | vs. No. 12 USC* | No. 3 | Rose Bowl; Pasadena, CA (Rose Bowl) | ABC | L 10–17 | 103,450 | |
*Non-conference game; ^{†}Homecoming; Rankings from AP Poll released prior to the game; All times are in Eastern time

== Game summaries ==
=== Notre Dame ===
#1 Notre Dame Fighting Irish (1–0) at #2 Michigan Wolverines (0–0)

| Quarter | 1 | 2 | 3 | 4 | Total |
|---|---|---|---|---|---|
| Notre Dame | 0 | 7 | 10 | 7 | 24 |
| Michigan | 0 | 6 | 0 | 13 | 19 |

at Michigan Stadium, Ann Arbor, Michigan

- Date: September 16
- Game time: 3:30 p.m. EDT
- Game weather: Rain
- Game attendance: 105,912
- TV announcers (ABC): Keith Jackson and Bob Griese
- Recap/Box Score

Game information

First quarter

- No scoring

Second quarter

- ND – Anthony Johnson 6-yard pass from Tony Rice (Craig Hentrich kick), 5:05. Notre Dame 7–0. Drive: 24 yards.
- MICH – Chris Calloway 9-yard pass from Michael Taylor (kick failed), 0:25. Notre Dame 7–6. Drive: 50 yards.

Third quarter

- ND – Raghib Ismail 89-yard kickoff return (Craig Hentrich kick), 14:49. Notre Dame 14–6.
- ND – Craig Hentrich 30-yard field goal, 4:28. Notre Dame 17–6.

Fourth quarter

- MICH – Derrick Walker 5-yard pass from Elvis Grbac (pass failed), 12:58. Notre Dame 17–12. Drive: 12 plays.
- ND – Raghib Ismail 92-yard kickoff return (Craig Hentrich kick), 12:46. Notre Dame 24–13.
- MICH – Greg McMurtry 4-yard pass from Elvis Grbac (J.D. Carlson kick), 4:08. Notre Dame 24–19. Drive: 13 plays, 67 yards.

Top passers

- ND – Tony Rice – 1/2, 6 yards, TD
- MICH – Elvis Grbac – 17/21, 134 yards, 2 TD

Top rushers

- ND – Anthony Johnson – 20 rushes, 80 yards
- MICH – Leroy Hoard – 15 rushes, 56 yards

Top receivers

- ND – Anthony Johnson – 1 reception, 6 yards, TD
- MICH – Greg McMurtry – 4 receptions, 51 yards, TD

=== At UCLA ===
Week 2: Michigan at UCLA

| Team | 1 | 2 | 3 | 4 | Total |
|---|---|---|---|---|---|
| • Michigan | 0 | 6 | 9 | 9 | 24 |
| UCLA | 7 | 7 | 3 | 6 | 23 |

- Date: September 23
- Location: Pasadena, CA
- Game attendance: 71,797

On September 23, Michigan defeated UCLA, 24–23, at the Rose Bowl in Pasadena, California.

UCLA took a 7–0 lead in the first quarter. Michigan scored in the second quarter on a 46-yard field goal by J.D. Carlson at the end of a 52-yard drive. UCLA then drove 70 yards and scored on a six-yard pass from Bret Johnson to S. Miller. Carlson kicked a 38-yard field goal later in the quarter, and UCLA led, 14–6, at halftime.

In the third quarter, Carlson kicked his third field goal, a 43-yarder. Later in the third quarter, Michigan took a 15–14 lead on a one-yard touchdown run by Leroy Hoard. Michigan's attempt at a two-point conversion failed. At the end of the third quarter, UCLA retook the lead on a 45-yard field goal by Alfredo Velasco. UCLA extended its lead with 5:42 remaining on a touchdown pass from Bret Johnson to Corwin Anthony. Michigan was forced to punt with 4:29 remaining, but Michigan cornerback David Key forced a fumble by UCLA tailback Shawn Wills. Michigan linebacker J.J. Grant recovered at UCLA's 43-yard line. Elvis Grbac completed passes of 11 yards to Derrick Walker and 12 yards to Tony Boles. The Wolverines scored on a three-yard pass from Grbac to Walker with 1:35 remaining. A two-point conversion failed, and Michigan trailed by two points. On the ensuing kickoff, J.D. Carlson converted an onside kick as the ball hopped over UCLA's front line where it was recovered by Vada Murray. Grbac completed a nine-yard pass to Chris Calloway, a 10-yard pass to Tony Boles, and a screen pass to Boles that was good for 17 yards. Carlson kicked the game-winning 24-yard field goal with one second remaining in the game.

Boles rushed for 82 yards, and Grbac completed 13 of 23 passes for 130 yards.

=== Maryland ===
Week 3: Maryland at Michigan

| Team | 1 | 2 | 3 | 4 | Total |
|---|---|---|---|---|---|
| Maryland | 0 | 7 | 0 | 14 | 21 |
| • Michigan | 14 | 14 | 7 | 6 | 41 |

- Date: September 30
- Location: Ann Arbor, MI
- Game attendance: 104,872

On September 30, Michigan defeated Maryland, 41–21, before a crowd of 104,872 at Michigan Stadium in Ann Arbor, Michigan.

The Wolverines scored touchdowns on four of their first five possessions. They tallied 279 rushing yards led by Tony Boles who gained 89 yards and scored two touchdowns on 10 carries, including a 64-yard touchdown run in the second quarter. Leroy Hoard added 72 yards and scored on a 72-yard run. In what the Detroit Free Press described as an "air show" by the normally ground-based Michigan offense, quarterback Elvis Grbac completed 10 of 20 passes for 187 yards and threw two touchdown passes in the first quarter, covering 23 yards to Chris Calloway and 11 yards Craig McMurtry. McMurtry caught five passes for 126 yards.

On defense, Michigan held Maryland to 63 rushing yards. Maryland's two quarterbacks (Neil O'Donnell and Scott Zolak) combined to complete 26 of 41 passes for 320 yards and two touchdowns.

=== Wisconsin ===
Week 4: Wisconsin at Michigan

| Team | 1 | 2 | 3 | 4 | Total |
|---|---|---|---|---|---|
| Wisconsin | 0 | 0 | 0 | 0 | 0 |
| • Michigan | 0 | 7 | 14 | 3 | 24 |

- Date: October 7
- Location: Ann Arbor, MI
- Game attendance: 104,097

On October 7, Michigan defeated Wisconsin, 24–0, before 104,097 at Michigan Stadium in Ann Arbor, Michigan. The Wolverines outgained the Badgers, 325 to 97, and dominated time of possession by 34:08 to 25:52. It was Michigan's first shutout since its 49–0 victory over Wisconsin in 1987.

On offense, Michigan tallied 158 rushing yards, led by Tony Boles with 95 yards, including a 42-yard touchdown run in the third quarter. Quarterback Elvis Grbac completed 16 of 23 passes for 167 yards and a touchdown. The offense sputtered in the first half, with Michigan's only points of the half scored when cornerback Lance Dottin intercepted a Wisconsin pass at the 22-yard line and returned it untouched for a touchdown. After the game, Schembechler was critical of his team's performance: "It was like a painting that you put up against nine other dogs. Somebody says yours is the best of the ten, but, hell, your painting isn't any damn good. That was what this game was like."

On defense, the Wolverines held the Badgers to 70 rushing yards and 27 passing yards. Wisconsin running back Jimmy Henderson tallied 62 yards on 16 carries. Redshirt freshman quarterback Sean Wilson completed only four of eleven passes.

=== At Michigan State ===
#5 Michigan Wolverines (3–1) at #21 Michigan State Spartans (2–2)

| Quarter | 1 | 2 | 3 | 4 | Total |
|---|---|---|---|---|---|
| Michigan | 7 | 3 | 0 | 0 | 10 |
| Michigan St | 0 | 0 | 0 | 7 | 7 |

at Spartan Stadium, East Lansing, Michigan

- Date: October 14, 1989
- Game time: 3:30 p.m.
- Game weather: Sunny, 82 °F (28 °C)
- Game attendance: 76,913
- Referee: Ron Winter
- TV: ABC

On October 14, Michigan defeated Michigan State, 10–7, before a crowd of 76,913 at Spartan Stadium in East Lansing, Michigan.

Michigan took a 7–0 lead in the first quarter on a 61-yard, 13 play drive, culminating in a fourth-down, one-yard touchdown run by tailback Tony Boles. J. D. Carlson kicked a 35-yard field goal in the second quarter, and Michigan led, 10–0, at halftime. After a scoreless third quarter, Michigan State drove 78 yards early in the fourth quarter to the one-yard line. On fourth down from the one-yard line, Blake Ezor was stopped by Tripp Welborne. On their next possession, the Spartans drove 62 yards, including a 36-yard pass from Dan Enos to James Bradley at the 11-yard line and endng with a four-yard touchdown pass from Enos to Courtney Hawkins.

The Wolverines gained 169 rushing yards and 76 passing yards. Tony Boles gained 100 yards on 22 carries, and Leroy Hoard tallied 62 yards on 15 carries.

On defense, the Wolverines held the Spartans to 85 rushing yards led by Ezor with 77 yards on 27 carries (2.9 per carry). Enos completed 21 of 31 passes for 214 yards, but he was intercepted twice. Vada Murray blocked a Michigan State field goal in the first quarter. J. J. Grant led the team with 14 tackles and stopped a Michigan State drive in the second quarter by "leaping, tipping and then intercepting" a pass. Outside linebacker Alex Marshall had two sacks and a fumble recovery.

| Team | Category | Player | Statistics |
|---|---|---|---|
| Michigan | Passing | Elvis Grbac | 8/15, 76 Yds, INT |
| Michigan | Rushing | Tony Boles | 22 Rush, 100 Yds |
| Michigan | Receiving | Greg McMurtry | 2 Rec, 33 Yds |
| Michigan St | Passing | Dan Enos | 21/31, 214 Yds, TD, 2 INT |
| Michigan St | Rushing | Blake Ezor | 27 Rush, 69 Yds |
| Michigan St | Receiving | Courtney Hawkins | 8 Rec, 89 Yds, TD |

Scoring summary

| Quarter | Time | Drive | | | Team | Scoring information | Score | |
| Quarter | Time | Plays | Yards | TOP | Team | Scoring information | UM | MSU |
|---|---|---|---|---|---|---|---|---|
| 1 | 12:20 | 12 | 61 | 6:31 | Michigan | Leroy Hoard 1-yard touchdown run, J.D. Carlson kick good | 7 | 0 |
| 2 | 5:44 | 13 | 56 | 6:00 | Michigan | 35-yard field goal by J.D. Carlson | 10 | 0 |
| 4 | 9:51 | 8 | 52 | 3:16 | Michigan St | Courtney Hawkins 4-yard touchdown reception from Dan Enos, John Langeloh kick good | 10 | 7 |
| "TOP" = time of possession. For other American football terms, see Glossary of American football. | | | | | | | 10 | 7 |

=== At Iowa ===
Week 6: Michigan at Iowa

| Team | 1 | 2 | 3 | 4 | Total |
|---|---|---|---|---|---|
| • Michigan | 6 | 3 | 14 | 3 | 26 |
| Iowa | 0 | 6 | 6 | 0 | 12 |

- Date: October 21
- Location: Iowa City, IA
- Game attendance: 67,700

On October 21, Michigan defeated Iowa, 26–12, before a crowd of 67,700 at Kinnick Stadium in Iowa City, Iowa. It was Michigan's first road win against Iowa since 1982.

In the first quarter, the Hawkeyes drove to Michigan's 20-yard line, but Iowa quarterback Matt Rodgers was hit in the backfield and fumbled; Brian Townsend recovered the loose ball and returned it to the Iowa 30-yard line. Michigan was unable to capitalize on the turnover, but later in the first quarter, Vada Murray intercepted a Rodgers pass, and Michigan took over at the Iowa 39-yard line. Michigan then scored on a 20-yard touchdown pass from Michael Taylor to Greg McMurtry. J. D. Carlson kicked a 22-yard field goal with 3:12 remaining in the first half, and Iowa then drove 56 yards in 2:51 and scored on a four-yard touchdown pass from Rodgers to Travis Watkins with 26 seconds remaining in the half. Michigan led, 9–6, at halftime.

Michigan extended its lead to 23–6 in the third quarter on a two-yard touchdown run by Taylor and a 45-yard touchdown pass from Taylor to Tony Boles. Late in the third quarter, Iowa scored on an 18-yard touchdown pass from Rodgers to Peter Marciano. In the fourth quarter, Michigan extended its lead to 26–12 on a 22-yard field goal by J.D. Carlson.

Michigan gained 185 rushing yards and 179 passing yards. Iowa tallied 44 rushing yards and 287 passing yards. Tony Boles led Michigan's rushing attack with 93 yards on 24 carries, and Taylor completed 11 of 15 passes for 179 yards. For Iowa, Rodgers completed 29 of 41 passes for 287 yards.

=== Indiana ===
Week 7: Indiana at Michigan

| Team | 1 | 2 | 3 | 4 | Total |
|---|---|---|---|---|---|
| Indiana | 0 | 3 | 0 | 7 | 10 |
| • Michigan | 0 | 24 | 7 | 7 | 38 |

- Date: October 21
- Location: Ann Arbor, MI
- Game attendance: 105,989

On October 28, Michigan defeated Indiana, 38–10, before a crowd of 105,989 at Michigan Stadium in Ann Arbor, Michigan.

Michigan outgained Indiana, 550–229. The Wolverines tallied 347 rushing yards, led by Tony Boles (156 yards and three touchdowns, 11.2 yards per carry) and Allen Jefferson (96 yards, 12.0 yards per carry). Quarterback Michael Taylor completed 11 of 18 passes for 165 yards and two touchdowns. Freshman wide receiver Desmond Howard caught three passes for 62 yards. Highlights included a 91-yard touchdown run by Boles at the 6:44 mark of the second quarter and a 43-yard touchdown pass from Taylor to Derrick Alexander at the 10:26 mark of the fourth quarter.

On defense, the Wolverines held the Hoosiers to 89 rushing yards and 140 passing yards. Anthony Thompson, who was the leading rusher in the Big Ten and finished second in the 1989 Heisman Trophy voting, was limited to 90 yards on 30 carries, an average of 3.0 yards per carry.

=== Purdue ===
Purdue Boilermakers (1–6) at #4 Michigan Wolverines (6–1)

| Quarter | 1 | 2 | 3 | 4 | Total |
|---|---|---|---|---|---|
| Purdue | 0 | 7 | 0 | 20 | 27 |
| Michigan | 7 | 21 | 7 | 7 | 42 |

at Michigan Stadium, Ann Arbor, Michigan

- Date: November 4, 1989
- Game time: 1:00 p.m.
- Game weather: Overcast, 44 °F (7 °C)
- Game attendance: 105, 126

External videos
- Game highlights

| Team | Category | Player | Statistics |
|---|---|---|---|
| Purdue | Passing | Eric Hunter | 27/42, 344 Yds, 4 TD, 2 INT |
| Purdue | Rushing | Jerome Sparkman | 11 Rush, 50 Yds |
| Purdue | Receiving | Calvin Williams | 13 Rec, 156 Yds, 3 TD |
| Michigan | Passing | Michael Taylor | 8/13, 124 Yds, TD |
| Michigan | Rushing | Tony Boles | 13 Rush, 80 Yds, 2 TD |
| Michigan | Receiving | Chris Calloway | 3 Rec, 68 Yds, TD |

Scoring summary

| Quarter | Time | Drive | | | Team | Scoring information | Score | |
| Quarter | Time | Plays | Yards | TOP | Team | Scoring information | PU | UM |
|---|---|---|---|---|---|---|---|---|
| 1 | 9:16 | 4 | 77 | 1:23 | Michigan | Tony Boles 39-yard touchdown run, J.D. Carlson kick good | 0 | 7 |
| 2 | 12:50 | 3 | 9 | 1:17 | Michigan | Desmond Howard 8-yard touchdown reception from Michael Taylor, J.D. Carlson kick good | 0 | 14 |
| 2 | 5:46 | 8 | 77 | 3:25 | Purdue | Calvin Williams 44-yard touchdown reception from Eric Hunter, Larry Sullivan kick good | 7 | 14 |
| 2 | 2:31 | 8 | 80 | 3:15 | Michigan | Tony Boles 1-yard touchdown run, J.D. Carlson kick good | 7 | 21 |
| 2 | 0:09 | 5 | 79 | 0:55 | Michigan | Chris Calloway 29-yard touchdown reception from Elvis Grbac, J.D. Carlson kick good | 7 | 28 |
| 3 | 1:10 | 3 | 16 | 0:57 | Michigan | Leroy Hoard 2-yard touchdown run, J.D. Carlson kick good | 7 | 35 |
| 4 | 13:03 | 1 | 11 | 0:06 | Purdue | Robert Oglesby 11-yard touchdown reception from Eric Hunter, Larry Sullivan kick good | 14 | 35 |
| 4 | 12:52 | | | | Michigan | Kickoff returned 85 yards for touchdown by Tony Boles, J.D. Carlson kick good | 14 | 42 |
| 4 | 6:48 | 3 | 34 | 1:19 | Purdue | Calvin Williams 3-yard touchdown reception from Eric Hunter, Larry Sullivan kick good | 21 | 42 |
| 4 | 2:33 | 4 | 61 | 1:14 | Purdue | Calvin Williams 15-yard touchdown reception from Eric Hunter, Larry Sullivan kick no good (wide right) | 27 | 42 |
| "TOP" = time of possession. For other American football terms, see Glossary of American football. | | | | | | | 27 | 42 |

=== At Illinois ===
Week 9: Michigan at Illinois

| Team | 1 | 2 | 3 | 4 | Total |
|---|---|---|---|---|---|
| • Michigan | 10 | 7 | 0 | 7 | 24 |
| Illinois | 7 | 3 | 0 | 0 | 10 |

- Date: November 11
- Location: Champaign, IL
- Game attendance: 73,069

On November 11, No. 3 Michigan defeated No. 8 Illinois, 24–10, before a crowd of 73,069 at Memorial Stadium in Champaign, Illinois.

On the opening drive of the game, Tony Boles ran 73 yards to the Illinois one-yard line, and Jarrod Bunch scored on a one-yard run with 14:01 remaining in the first quarter. Illinois responded with an 85-yard, 10-play drive ending with a three-yard touchdown run by fullback Howard Griffith. Michigan then drove 63 yards on 16 plays, ending with a 47-yard field goal by J.D. Carlson (a Michigan record at the time) with 2:02 remaining in the first quarter. Early in the second quarter, Illinois drove 61 yards on eight plays, and Doug Higgins kicked a 25-yard field goal to tie the game at 10-10. Later in the second quarter, Michigan drove 80 yards on 11 plays, scoring on a two-yard run by quarterback Michael Taylor. Michigan led, 17-10, at halftime.

Neither team scored in the third quarter. Late in the fourth quarter, Michigan drove 80 yards in 11 plays, led by Taylor's runs of 12, 12, and 15 yards, and ending with a 13-yard touchdown run by Boles with 2:31 remaining.

Michigan tallied 266 rushing yards and 123 passing yards. Boles led the Wolverines' rushing attack with 115 yards on nine carries. Taylor completed nine of 18 passes for 123 yards. Illinois was limited to 92 rushing yards, but quarterback Jeff George completed 22 of 38 passes for 253 yards. Michigan dominated time of possession with 34:52 to 25:08 for Illinois.

=== At Minnesota ===
#3 Michigan Wolverines (8–1) at Minnesota Golden Gophers (5–4)

| Quarter | 1 | 2 | 3 | 4 | Total |
|---|---|---|---|---|---|
| Michigan | 0 | 28 | 7 | 14 | 49 |
| Minnesota | 7 | 0 | 8 | 0 | 15 |

at Hubert H. Humphrey Metrodome, Minneapolis, Minnesota

- Date: November 18, 1989
- Game time: 11:30 a.m. CDT
- Game weather: Indoors (dome)
- Game attendance: 35,103
- Referee: Jerry Hendrickson
- TV: ESPN

| Team | Category | Player | Statistics |
|---|---|---|---|
| Michigan | Passing | Michael Taylor | 12/16, 231 Yds, 4 TD |
| Michigan | Rushing | Leroy Hoard | 11 Rush, 90 Yds, TD |
| Michigan | Receiving | Greg McMurtry | 7 Rec, 165 Yds, 3 TD |
| Minnesota | Passing | Marquel Fleetwood | 11/23, 100 Yds, 2 INT |
| Minnesota | Rushing | Darrell Thompson | 18 Rush, 50 Yds, TD |
| Minnesota | Receiving | Pat Tinglehoff | 7 Rec, 77 Yds |

Scoring summary

| Quarter | Time | Drive | | | Team | Scoring information | Score | |
| Quarter | Time | Plays | Yards | TOP | Team | Scoring information | MICH | MINN |
|---|---|---|---|---|---|---|---|---|
| 1 | 10:08 | 12 | 76 | 4:52 | Minnesota | Darrell Thompson 1-yard touchdown run, Brent Berglund kick good | 0 | 7 |
| 2 | 9:24 | 7 | 88 | 3:23 | Michigan | Greg McMurtry 34-yard touchdown reception from Michael Taylor, J.D. Carlson kick good | 7 | 7 |
| 2 | 4:14 | 5 | 59 | 1:43 | Michigan | Greg McMurtry 34-yard touchdown reception from Michael Taylor, J.D. Carlson kick good | 14 | 7 |
| 2 | 2:06 | 1 | 44 | 0:15 | Michigan | Leroy Hoard 29-yard touchdown run, J.D. Carlson kick good | 21 | 7 |
| 2 | 0:45 | 3 | 75 | 0:23 | Michigan | Greg McMurtry 25-yard touchdown reception from Michael Taylor, J.D. Carlson kick good | 28 | 7 |
| 3 | 9:48 | 10 | 77 | 5:12 | Michigan | Allen Jefferson 3-yard touchdown reception from Michael Taylor, J.D. Carlson kick good | 35 | 7 |
| 3 | 0:00 | 10 | 36 | 5:10 | Minnesota | Marquel Fleetwood 2-yard touchdown run, 2-point run good | 35 | 15 |
| 4 | 11:03 | 8 | 80 | 3:57 | Michigan | Allen Jefferson 15-yard touchdown run, J.D. Carlson kick good | 42 | 15 |
| 4 | 3:43 | 6 | 60 | 3:07 | Michigan | Desmond Howard 19-yard touchdown reception from Elvis Grbac, Gulam Khan kick good | 49 | 15 |
| "TOP" = time of possession. For other American football terms, see Glossary of American football. | | | | | | | 49 | 15 |

=== Ohio State ===
#20 Ohio State Buckeyes (8–2) at #3 Michigan Wolverines (9–1)

| Quarter | 1 | 2 | 3 | 4 | Total |
|---|---|---|---|---|---|
| Ohio St | 0 | 3 | 9 | 6 | 18 |
| Michigan | 7 | 7 | 0 | 14 | 28 |

at Michigan Stadium, Ann Arbor, Michigan

- Date: November 25
- Game weather: Partly sunny, 46 °F (8 °C)
- Game attendance: 106,137
- TV: ABC

Game information

First quarter

- MICH – Leroy Hoard 1-yard run (J.D. Carlson kick), 3:13. Michigan 7–0. Drive: 9 plays, 47 yards, 3:04.

Second quarter

- MICH – Allen Jefferson 2-yard run (J.D. Carlson kick), 2:23. Michigan 14–0. Drive: 13 plays, 81 yards, 6:28.
- OSU – Pat O'Morrow 20-yard field goal, 0:25. Michigan 14–3. Drive: 7 plays, 65 yards, 1:58.

Third quarter

- OSU – Pat O'Morrow 22-yard field goal, 10:45. Michigan 14–6. Drive: 8 plays, 49 yards, 2:24.
- OSU – Scottie Graham 3-yard run (run failed), 4:03. Michigan 14–12. Drive: 9 plays, 40 yards, 5:11.

Fourth quarter

- MICH – Jarrod Bunch 5-yard pass from Michael Taylor (J.D. Carlson kick), 12:22. Michigan 21–12. Drive: 6 plays, 53 yards, 2:32.
- OSU – Scottie Graham 4-yard run (kick blocked), 7:04. Michigan 21–18. Drive: 11 plays, 80 yards, 5:18.
- MICH – Jarrod Bunch 23-yard run (J.D. Carlson kick), 1:20. Michigan 28–18. Drive: 7 plays, 59 yards, 1:28.

Top passers

- OSU – Greg Frey – 14/25, 220 yards, 2 INT
- MICH – Michael Taylor – 8/16, 100 yards, TD

Top rushers

- OSU – Scottie Graham – 28 rushes, 133 yards, 2 TD
- MICH – Leroy Hoard – 21 rushes, 152 yards, TD

Top receivers

- OSU – Jim Palmer – 5 receptions, 61 yards
- MICH – Greg McMurtry – 3 receptions, 39 yards

Todd Plate's second interception of the day with 2:48 left in the game sealed the game and the Big Ten title for the Wolverines.

=== Rose Bowl (vs USC) ===
| Team | 1 | 2 | 3 | 4 | Total |
|---|---|---|---|---|---|
| • USC | 0 | 10 | 0 | 7 | 17 |
| Michigan | 0 | 3 | 7 | 0 | 10 |

- Location: Rose Bowl, Pasadena, CA

Scoring summary
| Q2 | | USC | Marinovich 1-yard run (Rodriguez kick) | USC 7–0 |
| Q2 | 6:28 | MICH | Carlson 19-yard field goal | USC 7–3 |
| Q2 | | USC | Rodriguez 34-yard field goal | USC 10–3 |
| Q3 | | MICH | Jeffereson 2-yard run (Carlson kick) | Tied 10–10 |
| Q4 | | USC | Ervins 9 yard run (Rodriguez kick) | USC 17–10 |

The 1990 Rose Bowl was a rematch of the previous Rose Bowl in which Michigan won 22–14. Prior to the contest, Bo Schembechler had announced he would retire. USC scored the first points in the second quarter with a one-yard run by Todd Marinovich. Michigan got a field goal to make it 7–3 but the Trojans added another field goal before the half to take a 10–3 lead at halftime. Although Michigan tied the score, Ricky Ervins had a 14-yard touchdown run which clinched the Rose Bowl for the Trojans.

== Roster ==
1989 Michigan Wolverines football team roster
Players
Coaches
Offense

| Pos. | # | Name | Class |
|---|---|---|---|
| WR | 1 | Derrick Alexander | Fr |
| RB | 46 | Tony Boles | Sr |
| FB | 32 | Jarrod Bunch | Sr |
| WR | 16 | Alfie Burch | Fr |
| WR | 2 | Chris Calloway | Sr |
| G | 68 | Joe Cocozzo | So |
| TE | 48 | Dave Diebolt | Fr |
| G | 78 | Dean Dingman | Jr |
| OL | 70 | Robert Doherty | So |
| OT | 73 | Tom Dohring | Sr |
| G, C | 51 | Steve Everitt | So |
| QB | 15 | Elvis Grbac | So |
| FB | 33 | Leroy Hoard | Sr |
| WR | 21 | Desmond Howard | So |
| RB | 28 | Allen Jefferson | Sr |
| WR | 84 | Dan Jokish | Jr |
| WR | 21 | David Knight | Sr |
| FB | 46 | Burnie Legette | Fr |
| TE | 82 | Tony McGee | Fr |
| WR | 1 | Greg McMurtry | Sr |
| FB | | Bill Prichard |
| G | | Marc Ramirez | Sr |
| OT | 72 | Doug Skene | So |
| OT | 75 | Greg Skrepenak | Jr |
| QB | | Ken Sollom | Jr |
| QB | 9 | Michael Taylor | Sr |
| WR | | Yale Van Dyne | Jr |
| RB | 25 | Jon Vaughan | So |
| TE | 89 | Derrick Walker | Sr |
| TE | 27 | Steve Zacharias | Sr |

Defense

| Pos. | # | Name | Class |
|---|---|---|---|
| OLB | 24 | Bobby Abrams | Sr |
| OLB | 37 | Erick Anderson | Jr |
| ILB | 49 | Chris Bohn | Jr |
| S | 20 | Corwin Brown | So |
| MG | 61 | Dave Caputo | Jr |
| OLB | 86 | Martin Davis | So |
| CB | 22 | Lance Dottin | Jr |
| DT | 61 | Mike Evans | Jr |
| LB | 57 | Chris Feaster | Sr |
| LB | 41 | Rusty Fitchner | Jr |
| ILB | 95 | J.J. Grant | Sr |
| DT | 97 | Chris Hutchinson | So |
| CB | 26 | David Key | Sr |
| ILB | 39 | Curt Mallory | So |
| OLB | 59 | Alex Marshall | Jr |
| DT | 50 | Matt McCoy | Sr |
| ILB | 30 | John Milligan | Sr |
| S | 27 | Vada Murray | Sr |
| DT | 94 | T.J. Osman | Sr |
| CB | 63 | Todd Plate | Sr |
| S | 29 | David Ritter | Jr |
| OLB | 65 | Cornelius Simpson | Jr |
| ILB | 58 | Scott Smykowski | Sr |
| ILB | 55 | Marc Spencer | Sr |
| DT | 60 | Buster Stanley | Fr |
| MG | 91 | Mike Teeter | Sr |
| OLB | 45 | Brian Townsend | Jr |
| ILB | 61 | Eric Taupe | Jr |
| DB | 5 | Coleman Wallace | So |
| CB | 8 | Dwayne Ware | So |
| S | 3 | Tripp Welborne | Sr |
| DT | 88 | Brent White | Sr |
| OLB | 85 | Timothy Williams | Sr |

Special teams

| Pos. | # | Name | Class |
|---|---|---|---|
| K | 38 | J.D. Carlson | Jr |
| K | 12 | Gulam Kahn | Sr |
| P | 18 | Chris Stapleton | Fr |

Head coach

- Bo Schembechler

Coordinators/assistant coaches

- Tirrel Burton
- Cam Cameron
- Lloyd Carr
- Jerry Hanlon
- Bill Harris
- Jim Herrmann
- Les Miles
- Gary Moeller
- Bobby Morrison
- Tom Reed

Legend

- (C) Team captain
- (S) Suspended
- (I) Ineligible
- Injured
- Redshirt

Roster

== Player statistics ==
Passing

| Player | Attempts | Comp. | Pct. | Yards | TD | INT |
|---|---|---|---|---|---|---|
| Michael Taylor | 102 | 64 | 62.7% | 966 | 11 | 3 |
| Elvis Grbac | 116 | 73 | 62.9% | 824 | 8 | 3 |
| Ken Sollom | 3 | 2 | 66.7% | 28 | 0 | 0 |

Rushing

| Player | Yds | Att | Avg | TD |
|---|---|---|---|---|
| Tony Boles | 839 | 131 | 6.4 | 9 |
| Leroy Hoard | 724 | 145 | 5.0 | 6 |
| Allen Jefferson | 378 | 64 | 5.9 | 2 |
| Jarrod Bunch | 199 | 47 | 4.2 | 2 |
| Michael Taylor | 173 | 47 | 4.5 | 2 |
| Burnie Legette | 98 | 22 | 4.5 | 0 |
| Jon Vaughn | 57 | 10 | 5.7 | 0 |

Receiving

| Player | Rec | Yds | Avg | TD |
|---|---|---|---|---|
| Greg McMurtry | 37 | 655 | 17.7 | 7 |
| Chris Calloway | 29 | 392 | 13.5 | 3 |
| Tony Boles | 16 | 224 | 14.0 | 1 |
| Desmond Howard | 9 | 136 | 15.1 | 2 |
| Derrick Walker | 12 | 110 | 9.2 | 3 |
| Derrick Alexander | 6 | 107 | 17.8 | 1 |
| Leroy Hoard | 13 | 87 | 6.7 | 0 |

== Awards and honors ==
Safety Tripp Welborne received consensus first-team honors on the 1989 All-America team. He received first-team honors from, among others, the Associated Press (AP), United Press International (UPI), American Football Coaches Association, and Football Writers Association of America.

Tailback Tony Boles gained 839 rushing yards in 1989 (1,359 in 1988) and was selected as the team's most valuable player. He sustained torn anterior cruciate ligaments (ACL) in his right knee on November 18 against Minnesota. The injury required reconstructive knee surgery, and Boles was therefore unable to play in the Rose Bowl.

The following 13 players received first- or second-team honors from the AP or UPI on the 1989 All-Big Ten Conference football team:

- Tony Boles at running back (AP-1, UPI-1)
- J.D. Carlson at kicker (AP-1, UPI-1)
- Dean Dingman at guard (AP-1, UPI-1)
- Derrick Walker at tight end (AP-1, UPI-1)
- Tripp Welborne at defensive back (AP-1, UPI-1)
- Greg McMurtry at receiver (AP-2, UPI-1)
- Greg Skrepenak at tackle (AP-2, UPI-2)
- Erick Anderson at linebacker (AP-2, UPI-2)
- J. J. Grant at linebacker (AP-2, UPI-2)
- Vada Murray at defensive back (AP-2, UPI-2)
- Michael Taylor at quarterback (AP-2)
- Bobby Abrams at outside linebacker (AP-2)
- Mike Teeter at defensive line (UPI-2)

Other team awards included:

- Meyer Morton Award: Chris Calloway
- John Maulbetsch Award: Steve Everitt
- Frederick Matthei Award: Dean Dingman
- Arthur Robinson Scholarship Award: Tim Williams
- Dick Katcher Award: Mike Teeter
- Hugh Rader Jr. Award: Derrick Walker
- Robert P. Ufer Award: Chris Calloway

== Professional football ==
The following players were selected in the 1990 NFL draft.

| Player | Position | Round | Pick | NFL club |
|---|---|---|---|---|
| Leroy Hoard | Running Back | 2 | 45 | Cleveland Browns |
| Greg McMurtry | Wide Receiver | 3 | 80 | New England Patriots |
| Chris Calloway | Wide Receiver | 4 | 97 | Pittsburgh Steelers |
| Derrick Walker | Tight End | 6 | 163 | San Diego Chargers |

A total of 25 players from the 1989 team went on to play professional football: Bobby Abrams; Derrick Alexander; Erick Anderson; Tony Boles; Jarrod Bunch; Corwin Brown; Chris Calloway; Joe Cocozzo; Tom Dohring; Matt Elliott; Steve Everitt; Elvis Grbac; Leroy Hoard; Desmond Howard; Burnie Legette; Tony McGee; Greg McMurtry; Doug Skene; Greg Skrepenak; Buster Stanley; Mike Teeter; Brian Townsend; Jon Vaughn; Derrick Walker; and Tripp Welborne.
