= Tripp Welborne =

American football player (born 1968)

No. 32
- Positions: Safety, punt returner

Personal information
- Born: November 20, 1968 (age 57); Reidsville, North Carolina, U.S.
- Listed height: 6 ft 2 in (1.88 m)
- Listed weight: 210 lb (95 kg)

Career information
- High school: Walter H. Page (Greensboro, North Carolina)
- College: Michigan
- NFL draft: 1991: 7th round, 180th overall pick

Career history
- Minnesota Vikings (1992)

Awards and highlights
- 2× Unanimous All-American (1989, 1990); 2× First-team All-Big Ten (1989, 1990)

Career NFL statistics
- Games played: 2
- Stats at Pro Football Reference

Sullivan Anthony "Tripp" Welborne III (born November 20, 1968) is an American former professional football player for the Minnesota Vikings of the National Football League (NFL).

Welborne played college football, principally as a safety and punt returner, for the University of Michigan from 1987 to 1990. He had five interceptions as a sophomore in 1988, and was a two-time unanimous All-American in both 1989 and 1990, the only player in school history to do so. As a senior, he was awarded College Defensive Player of the Year, Team Most Valuable Player, and set a Michigan single-season record with 455 punt return yards (a record that stood until broken by Steve Breaston in 2003) and averaged 14.7 yards per return.

Welborne sustained a serious injury in the 10th game of the 1990 season that required reconstructive surgery on his right knee. He was unable to play during the 1991 NFL season, but attempted a comeback the following year. He appeared in only two games for Minnesota Vikings during the 1992 NFL season before suffering a career ending ACL injury to his left knee.

== Early life ==
Welborne was born in Reidsville, North Carolina, in 1968. He was given the nickname "Tripp" because he was the third generation in his family to be named Sullivan Welborne. His father, Dr. Sullivan Welborne Jr., was an administrator and chemistry professor at North Carolina A&T University. His mother, Gloria, was a kindergarten teacher.

Welborne attended Walter Hines Page Senior High School in Greensboro, North Carolina. He was a three-sport star at Page High School, playing football, basketball and baseball. He was rated the #1 wide receiver prospect in the country while in high school and was an All-State basketball and football player on both offense and defense. The Page Pirates football team compiled a 40-1-1 record and won two state championships with Welborne in the lineup. In the 1985 4A state championship game, he blocked a field goal attempt on the final play that a teammate returned for a touchdown to give the Pirates a 26–20 victory over Terry Sanford High School. Welborne also became an Eagle Scout while in high school.

== University of Michigan ==
Welborne enrolled at the University of Michigan in 1987 and played college football for the Michigan Wolverines football team from 1987 to 1990. He arrived at Michigan as a highly rated wide receiver prospect, and played in every game. He caught two passes for 45 yards during the 1987 season.

=== 1988 season ===
As the Wolverines prepared for the 1988 season, they were well stocked with receivers (including Chris Calloway, Greg McMurtry, Derrick Walker and John Kolesar) but short on talent at defensive back. Accordingly, head coach Bo Schembechler began to use Welborne as a defensive back during spring practice in April 1988. Welborne handled the position change well, winning the 1988 John Maulbetsch Award as the freshman player best demonstrating desire, character, and capacity for leadership during spring practice. He started all 12 games at strong safety for the 1988 Michigan football team, compiling 72 tackles, five interceptions, three pass breakups, and two fumble recoveries.

=== 1989 season ===
As a junior, Welborne again started all 12 games at strong safety for the 1989 team that compiled a 10–2 record, lost to USC in the 1990 Rose Bowl, and finished the season ranked #7 in the final AP Poll. Welborne totaled 80 tackles, four pass breakups and three interceptions in 1989. He also became Michigan's principal punt returner in 1989, returning 32 punts for 297 yards, an average of 9.3 yards per return. At the end of the season, he was honored as a unanimous first-team defensive back on the 1989 All-America Team.

=== 1990 season ===
As a senior, Welborne started the first 10 games of the 1990 season at strong safety. In just 10 games, Welborne had 86 tackles, seven pass breakups, a fumble and an interception. He also returned 31 punts for 455 yards (an average of 14.7 yards per return), including returns of 60 yards against Indiana, 53 yards against Illinois, and 38 yards against Notre Dame. Welborne broke Michigan's single-season record with his total of 455 punt return yards, a record that stood until 2003 when it was broken by Steve Breaston. In the 10th game of the 1990 season, on November 17, 1990, Welborne sustained a serious injury to his right knee while returning a punt 31 yards to Minnesota's 20-yard line to set up the go-ahead touchdown for Michigan. At the end of the 1990 season, Welborne was honored as the Most Valuable Player on the 1990 Michigan team. He was college defensive player of the year, and was also selected for the second consecutive year as a unanimous first-team All-American.

=== Career statistics ===
In three years at strong safety, 238 tackles, nine interceptions, fifteen pass breakups, and two fumble recoveries. He also returned 67 punts for 773 yards, an average of 11.5 yards per return. During Welborne's three years as a defensive starter from 1988 to 1990, Michigan won three Big Ten Conference championships, compiled a 36-11-1 record, and finished ranked in the top ten each year (#4 in 1988, #7 in 1989, and #7 in 1990). In 1990, Lloyd Carr, then Michigan's defensive coordinator, said of Welborne: "Tripp does more than any player we've ever had. He is an outstanding blitzer and ball-reactor, very intelligent."

== Professional football ==
Welborne was selected by the Minnesota Vikings in the seventh round (180th pick) of the 1991 NFL draft. He was projected to be drafted as a top 5 pick in the first round, but fell in the draft after injuring his knee and undergoing reconstructive surgery. He missed the 1991 NFL season while rehabilitating his knee, but signed a contract with the Vikings in April 1992 that was contingent on Welborne passing a physical examination on his knee. Welborne appeared in two games for the Vikings during the 1992 season. He tore the ACL in his left knee during a game against the Detroit Lions, ending his 1992 season. He attempted a comeback in 1993, but injured his knee again, and his playing career was over.

== Later life ==
After retiring from his playing career, Welborne formed a company to provide scholarships and seminars to young people. He then moved into the financial service field, working for Wachovia Securities, as a risk manager at Bank of America, and then with Target Financial Services. From at least 2008 to 2015, Welborne was employed as the athletic director at Shorecrest Preparatory School, a private school in St. Petersburg, Florida. In January 2012, he oversaw the opening of the school's new $7 million, 34,000 square foot athletic facility. In March 2015, he was hired to serve as the athletic director at the Lawrenceville School in Lawrenceville, New Jersey, starting in July 2015.
