= Tony Boles =

American football player (born 1967)

Profile
- Positions: Running back, kick returner

Personal information
- Born: December 11, 1967 (age 58); Thomasville, Georgia, U.S.
- Listed height: 6 ft 1 in (1.85 m)
- Listed weight: 196 lb (89 kg)

Career information
- College: Michigan
- NFL draft: 1991: 11th round, 291st overall pick

Career history
- 1991: Dallas Cowboys
- 1992: San Antonio Riders
- 1992: Dallas Cowboys*
- * Offseason or practice squad member only

Awards and highlights
- Third-team All-American (1988); 2× First-team All-Big Ten (1988, 1989); Big Ten Rushing Champion (1989); Michigan Wolverines team MVP (1989)

Tony Boles (born December 11, 1967) is an American former professional football player who was a running back and kick returner who was drafted by the Dallas Cowboys of the National Football League (NFL). After starring in college football for the Michigan Wolverines, where he once led the Big Ten Conference in rushing, he went on to a scandal ridden life. His college football career was ended prematurely due to a knee injury. He has been sentenced to prison multiple times and placed in homes for addicts due to cocaine abuse.

== Early life ==
Boles was born in Thomasville, Georgia and his family settled in Westland, Michigan when he was ten years old. He grew up in a predominantly white neighborhood where he was one of only four African Americans in the entire student body at John Glenn High School. He took a white woman to the high school prom, but was not allowed to enter her home. She had to pick him up for the prom. He also attended Marshall Junior High School.

In high school, he received All-American honors at running back, while setting eight team rushing and four team scoring records, including a career total of 3,139 rushing yards and 38 touchdowns on 495 carries. He led the school to its first playoff appearance. He also practiced basketball.

== College career ==
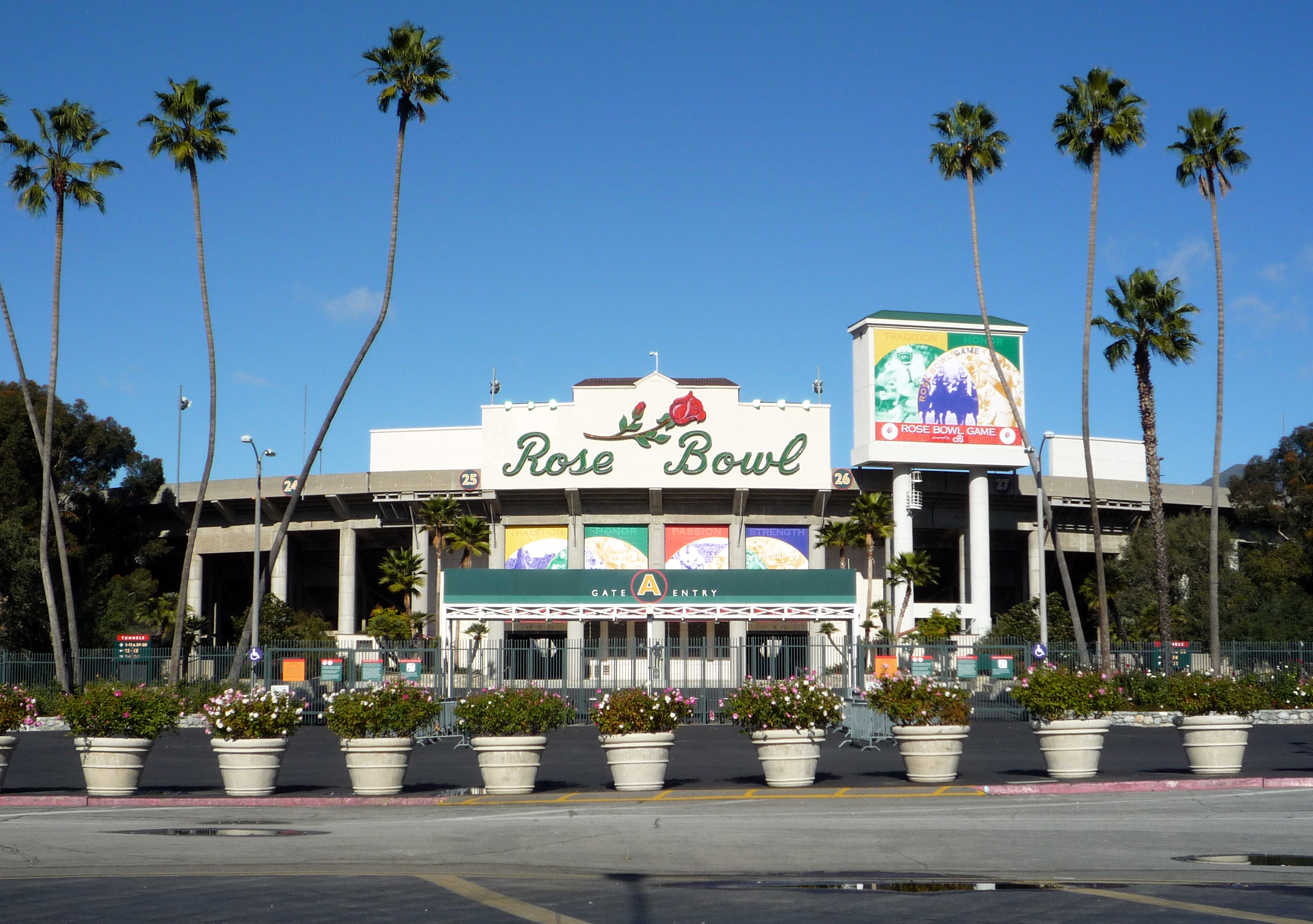
Boles played for the 1989 Rose Bowl Champions.

Boles starred for coach Bo Schembechler at the University of Michigan where he was twice named All-Big Ten on repeat conference champions in 1988 and 1989 and named the team most valuable player for the 1989 NCAA Division I-A football season. These were Schembechler's final two seasons at Michigan. With Boles, the team won the January 1, 1989 Rose Bowl, but with him on the sidelines they lost the January 1, 1990 contest. Boles shared the 1988 Big Ten rushing title with Anthony Thompson. Boles won the title for conference games only, while Thompson won the title for all games played. After redshirting in 1986, he was limited to 4 games by a hand injury, while playing primarily as a kickoff returner.

As a sophomore in 1988, he rushed for 1,408 yards (1,287 m), finishing second in the Big Ten Conference and fourth in the Nation in rushing, becoming the tenth player in Michigan history to rush for over 1,000 yards in a single-season. He also finished second in the conference with a 25.2-yard kickoff return average. Against the University of Wisconsin, he rushed for 179 yards and 3 touchdowns on only 10 carries. Against Wake Forest University, he had a career-high 213 rushing yards on 33 carries.

During the 1989 season, his carries were somewhat limited due to a pinched nerve. Entering the final game he had accumulated 822 yards (752 m) rushing in nine games on 130 rushes, Schembechler was starting to support his Heisman Trophy candidacy:

Michigan tailback Tony Boles can run (can he ever!) but he can't hide from the Heisman Trophy anymore. He's finally got Bo Schembechler touting him for college football's most glamorous honor and that's never happened before. … 'He's (darn) good,' Schembechler said. 'You're (darn) right. He's averaging 6.3 yards (5.8 m) a carry. That's not too shabby.' ... Boles, who last season rushed for 1,408 yards (1,287 m) and nine touchdowns, has 822 yards (752 m) and nine TDs this season. ... 'That's the difference between Tony and some of the other backs we've had here. He was not a big track man. He was baseball and all-sports in high school.'

On November 18, he was seriously injured against the University of Minnesota, when he suffered a torn anterior cruciate ligament. He had arthroscopic surgery on his knee, while Leroy Hoard replaced him for the final 2.5 games. Despite the injury-shortened season, he finished with 839 yards as the team's leading rusher and fifth in the Big Ten Conference. He also posed a big-play threat with runs of 91, 71, 64 and 46 yards as well as an 85-yard kickoff return for a touchdown. His 91-yard touchdown run against Indiana University at the time was the second longest in school history, and his 85-yard kick return was the fourth longest and fifth kickoff return for a touchdown in Michigan history.

In 1990, Boles attempted a comeback as a wide receiver to no avail and spent his senior season in rehabilitation. Jon Vaughn and Ricky Powers carried the load at tailback in his place. In retrospect, Boles sometimes regretted not having gone to one of the historically black colleges and universities. He dropped out of classes because he says "didn't want to be crutching around campus" and he eventually stopped rehabbing his knee and became irregular with his workouts. After the injury, he dropped out of school and fell onto hard times.

Boles compiled 10 100-yard games while rushing for 2,247 yards (2,055 m) in two years at Michigan. In addition to playing running back, Boles excelled as a kick returner where he accumulated 639 yards (584 m) and a touchdown on 25 returns for a 25.6 yards (23.4 m) per return average.

== Professional career ==
Boles was represented by agent Thom Darden and had been projected as a first round draft pick before his injury. He was selected by the Dallas Cowboys in the eleventh round (291st overall) of the 1991 NFL draft as part of head coach Jimmy Johnson's rebuilding efforts. He was part of a Cowboy draft class that included three first round selections (Russell Maryland, Alvin Harper, and Kelvin Pritchett), eleven picks in the first four rounds and eighteen overall selections. Boles was assigned rookie initiation duties of washing Emmitt Smith's Pathfinder, but instead of washing the car disappeared with it for two days while bingeing. He eventually tested positive and was released by the Cowboys. The Cowboys placed him on the reserve non-football injury list on August 20.

In 1992, he played with the San Antonio Riders of the World League of American Football for most of the season until he got mixed up in criminal activity. At first, he mysteriously disappeared from practice on a day of random drug testing. Before the disappearance, his World League performance had enabled Boles to get signed as a free agent by the Cowboys in early April 1992, but by June the team released him. He finished with 13 carries for 41 yards.

== Personal life ==
On November 11, 1994, Boles was arrested on charges of possession of drug paraphernalia and petty theft and wound up in jail in Naples, Florida.

Boles discovered at age 27 that he had not been reared by his biological father. He soon thereafter started using cocaine. After football ended, he worked various jobs such as construction and working at a grocery store. He then started selling drugs and then using his product. This led him to a series of arrests, prison stays, and homeless periods. In 2003, two former teammates tracked him down and set him up with a job at a car wash. However, Boles fell back into his criminal ways. Boles was convicted of robbing an elderly couple and was sentenced to three to fifteen years in prison. He was released into a work program. He also found himself at the Elmhurst Home, Inc. substance abuse treatment center in 2006. The residential treatment center has since 1972 been used to host about 100 recovering addicts at a time providing Narcotics Anonymous and Alcoholics Anonymous meeting places, military-style roll calls, daily tasks, and progress logs.

Physically, in 2006, Boles was described as starting to gray, missing two top front teeth and suffering from an arthritic knee. He stood 6 feet 2 inches (1.88 m) and 190 pounds (86 kg; 14 st). He had a 21-year-old daughter and kept in touch with his mother. His stepfather had died in 1994.

Boles was arrested in Ypsilanti, Michigan on September 9, 2007, and pleaded guilty to one count of receiving and concealing stolen property. He was sentenced to serve two to five years in prison for receiving and concealing stolen property in violation of his parole in Washtenaw County Circuit Court. He had previously served six months in prison for unarmed robbery before he was paroled in 2005. Boles' most recent infraction occurred when with an outstanding warrant, he provided a false name to officers investigating why he was blocking traffic with a car they would find out had been stolen from Detroit, Michigan. He had been attempting to converse with sidewalk pedestrians while purchasing drugs. Boles lost his son, Christopher, to a traffic accident at the age of 17 in February 2016.

== See also ==
- Lists of Michigan Wolverines football rushing leaders
