= Erick Anderson =

American football player (born 1968)

No. 50, 56
- Position: Linebacker

Personal information
- Born: October 7, 1968 (age 58); Long Beach, California, U.S.
- Listed height: 6 ft 1 in (1.85 m)
- Listed weight: 240 lb (109 kg)

Career information
- High school: Glenbrook South (Glenview, Illinois)
- College: Michigan
- NFL draft: 1992: 7th round, 186th overall pick

Career history
- Kansas City Chiefs (1992–1993); Washington Redskins (1994–1995)

Awards and highlights
- Butkus Award (1991); Jack Lambert Trophy (1991); First-team All-American (1991); 2× First-team All-Big Ten (1990, 1991); Second-team All-Big Ten (1989)

Career NFL statistics
- Tackles: 10
- Forced fumbles: 1
- Stats at Pro Football Reference

Erick Scott Anderson (born October 7, 1968) is an American former professional football player who was a linebacker in the National Football League (NFL).

Anderson played college football for the Michigan Wolverines from 1988 to 1991. As a senior in 1991, he won the Butkus Award as the best collegiate linebacker in the country, was named Co-Defensive Player of the Year in the Big Ten Conference and was selected as a first-team All-American. He is the only player in Wolverines history to lead the team in tackles for four consecutive years, and his 390 tackles at Michigan ranks third in school history.

Anderson played in the NFL for the Kansas City Chiefs in 1993 and the Washington Redskins in 1994.

== Early life ==
Anderson was born in Long Beach, California, in 1968. He attended Glenbrook South High School in Glenview, Illinois, a suburb of Chicago.

== University of Michigan ==
Anderson enrolled at the University of Michigan in 1987 and played college football as a linebacker for the Michigan Wolverines football teams from 1988 to 1991.

=== 1988 season ===
After redshirting in 1987, Anderson started six games at inside linebacker for the 1988 Michigan Wolverines football team that compiled a 9-2-1 record, outscored opponent 361-167, and was ranked #4 in the final AP Poll. After Michigan lost its first two games to then #1 ranked Miami and eventual national champion Notre Dame, Anderson was inserted into the lineup for the third game against Wake Forest. The Wolverines went undefeated in their final 10 games. Anderson had the best game of his freshman season against Ohio State, registering 16 tackles, as the Wolverines defeated the Buckeyes 34-31. He also had 12 tackles, including eight solo tackles, in Michigan's 22-14 victory over USC in the 1989 Rose Bowl. Despite his freshman status and starting only half the games, Anderson led the 1988 team with 77 tackles.

=== 1989 season ===
As a sophomore, Anderson started all 12 games at inside linebacker for the 1988 Michigan team that compiled a 10-2 record, outscored opponents 335-184, and was ranked #7 in the final AP Poll. He had his best game of the season against Ohio State, registering 15 tackles, including 12 solo tackles, as the Wolverines defeated the Buckeyes, 7-0. He also had 10 tackles against USC in the 1990 Rose Bowl. For the second consecutive year, Anderson led the Wolverines in tackles; his 105 tackles was 25 tackles higher than the team's second-leading tackler.

=== 1990 season ===
As a junior in 1990, Anderson again started all 12 games at inside linebacker for the 1990 Michigan team that compiled a 9-3 record and defeated Ole Miss in the 1991 Gator Bowl. He led the Wolverines in tackles (106) for the third straight year, won the team's Frederick Matthei Award as player who displays leadership, drive and achievement on the athletic field and in the classroom, and was selected as a first-team All-Big Ten linebacker.

=== 1991 season ===
As a senior, he was a team co-captain and started all 12 games at inside linebacker for the 1991 Michigan team that compiled a 10-2 record, outscored opponents 420-203, and was ranked #6 in the final AP Poll. In his final regular season game, Anderson had 17 tackles, including 16 solo tackles, one quarterback sack, and forced a fumble and recovered another, in a 31-3 victory over Ohio State, as the Wolverines limited the Buckeyes to 109 rushing yards.

With a team-leading 102 tackles, Anderson became the only person in Michigan football history to lead the team in tackles for four consecutive years. At the end of the 1991 season, Anderson was selected by the United Press International as a first-team All-American. He was also named the Co-Defensive Player of the Year in the Big Ten Conference, and he won both the Butkus Award and the Jack Lambert Trophy as the best collegiate linebacker in the country. He was named the 1991 winner of The Roger Zatkoff Award as the team's best linebacker.

In January 1992, he participated in the 17th annual Japan Bowl. With eight minutes remaining in the game, he intercepted a Matt Rodgers pass that set up the game-winning touchdown in a 14-13 win for the East squad. After the game, East coach Johnny Majors called the interception "the work of an outstanding athlete" and called Anderson "an alert, smart player."

=== Career statistics ===
In each of Anderson's four years at Michigan, the Wolverines defeated Ohio State, either won outright or tied for the Big Ten Conference championship and finished no lower than #7 in the final AP polls. During that time, Anderson compiled 390 tackles, including 286 solo tackles, a career tally that ranks third at Michigan behind Jarrett Irons (429) and Ron Simpkins (415). He also had 25 tackles for loss, seven quarterback sacks, six pass breakups, four fumble recoveries, and four interceptions.

== Professional career ==
Anderson was selected by the Kansas City Chiefs in the seventh round (186th overall pick) of the 1992 NFL draft. He appeared in eight games, one as a starter, for the Chiefs during the 1993 NFL season. He was waived by the Chiefs in late August 1994.

At the end of November 1994, Anderson signed as a free agent with the Washington Redskins. He appeared in two games, neither as a starter, for the Redskins during the final month of the 1994 NFL season.

== Family and later years ==
Anderson is the older brother of Kurt Anderson, who has been an assistant coach with the Buffalo Bills of the NFL.

After retiring as a football player, Anderson operated FIT (Fitness In Teams, LLC), an organization providing social skills training for children with autism spectrum disorders and ADD.

Anderson currently serves as the Outside Linebackers Coach at Baldwin Wallace University.
