= Bobby Abrams =

American football player (born 1967)

No. 51, 50, 56
- Position: Linebacker

Personal information
- Born: April 12, 1967 (age 59); Detroit, Michigan, U.S.
- Listed height: 6 ft 3 in (1.91 m)
- Listed weight: 240 lb (109 kg)

Career information
- High school: Ford (Detroit)
- College: Michigan
- NFL draft: 1990: undrafted

Career history
- New York Giants (1990–1991); Dallas Cowboys (1992); Cleveland Browns (1992); New York Giants (1992); Dallas Cowboys (1993); Minnesota Vikings (1993–1994); New England Patriots (1995–1996)

Awards and highlights
- 3× Super Bowl champion (XXV, XXVII, XXVIII); Second-team All-Big Ten (1989)

Career NFL statistics
- Tackles: 38
- Forced fumbles: 1
- Stats at Pro Football Reference

Bobby E. Abrams Jr. (born April 12, 1967) is an American former professional football player who was a linebacker in the National Football League (NFL). He played college football as a defensive back and linebacker for the Michigan Wolverines from 1986 to 1989. He played in the NFL for six seasons as a linebacker and special teams player for the New York Giants (1990–1992, Cleveland Browns (1992), Dallas Cowboys (1992–1993), Minnesota Vikings (1993–1994) and New England Patriots (1995). He won three Super Bowl titles with the Giants and the Cowboys, all over the Buffalo Bills.

== Early life ==
Abrams was born in Detroit, Michigan, in 1967. He attended Henry Ford High School in Detroit. He was an All-state selection as a senior. He made the honor roll for 8 straight semesters. He also practiced track.

== College career ==
Abrams accepted a football scholarship from the University of Michigan, to play under head coach Bo Schembechler's Michigan Wolverines football teams from 1986 to 1989. He began as a safety and was converted into a linebacker in spring drills in 1987.

As a sophomore, he was named the starter at right outside linebacker in the fourth game of the season. He started nine games (seven at outside linebacker, two at inside linebacker) for the 1987 Michigan Wolverines football team.

As a redshirt junior, he started all 12 games at outside linebacker for the 1988 Michigan team that compiled a 9-2-1 record, won the Big Ten Conference championship, defeated USC in the 1989 Rose Bowl, and finished the season ranked #4 in the final AP Poll.

In his final year at Michigan, he again started all 12 games at outside linebacker for the 1989 Michigan team that compiled a 10–2 record, won a second consecutive Big Ten championship, lost to USC in the 1990 Rose Bowl, and finished the season ranked #7 in the final AP Poll. Against the University of Maryland, he made 8 tackles, 3 sacks, one pass defensed and one fumble recovery.

== Professional career ==
Abrams was signed as an undrafted free agent by the New York Giants after the 1990 NFL draft. As a rookie, he was a part of the Super Bowl XXV winning team. He was a special teams player and a backup linebacker behind Lawrence Taylor and Carl Banks. He appeared in 32 games, including two as a starter in place of an injured Banks, before being waived on August 31, 1992.

On September 1, 1992, he was claimed by the Dallas Cowboys to provide depth on the special teams units. He had 4 special teams tackles and was cut on October 6. He was later signed by the Cleveland Browns where he played in three games. On November 9, he was claimed off waivers by the Giants after Taylor was lost for the year. On November 21, he was released to make room for Ken Willis.

In April 1993, he was re-signed by the Cowboys. He joined the Minnesota Vikings for the last four games. The next year, he appeared in all 16 games for the Vikings as a backup, while leading the team with 28 special teams tackles.

Abrams signed with the New England Patriots on March 1, 1995, appearing in nine games (one start) during the season. On September 10, 1996, he was released from the injured reserve list.

== Personal life ==
Abrams was a teacher and head coach at Southside High School. He is currently the principal at Jefferson Davis High School in Montgomery, Alabama. His father Bobby Sr., is a former 3-time Golden Gloves boxing champion in Detroit.
