= Legette =

Legette is a surname. Notable people with the surname include:

- Burnie Legette (born 1970), American football player
- Tyrone Legette (born 1970), American football player

== See also ==
- Felisha Legette-Jack (born 1966), American women's basketball player and coach
