= 1992 All-Big Ten Conference football team =

American college football all-star team

The 1992 All-Big Ten Conference football team consists of American football players chosen as All-Big Ten Conference players for the 1992 NCAA Division I-A football season. The organizations selecting All-Big Ten teams in 1992 included the Associated Press (AP).

Only two players, Michigan running back Tyrone Wheatley and Purdue defensive tackle Jeff Zgonina were unanimously selected by the AP's media panel. They were also named the Big Ten's Offensive and Defensive Players of the Year, respectively. Wheatley led the conference with 1,357 rushing yards, 7.3 rushing yards per attempt, 1,502 yards from scrimmage and 16 touchdowns from scrimmage. Simeon Rice of the Illinois Fighting Illini was selected as the Big Ten Freshman of the Year.

The undefeated 1992 Michigan Wolverines football team won the conference championship, compiled a 9–0–3 record, and landed eight players on the AP's first-team All-Big Ten squad. In addition to Wheatley, Michigan's first-team honorees included quarterback Elvis Grbac who led the country with a 150.2 passing efficiency rating and led the conference with 18 total touchdowns and 17 passing touchdowns. Michigan's other first-team players included wide receiver Derrick Alexander, offensive linemen Steve Everitt, Joe Cocozzo, and Rob Doherty, defensive tackle/outside linebacker Chris Hutchinson and defensive back Corwin Brown. Hutchinson was honored as the Big Ten Defensive Lineman of the Year, and Michigan head coach Gary Moeller was named the Big Ten Coach of the Year.

Ohio State and Iowa each landed three players on the AP's first team. The Ohio State honorees were all defensive players: linebacker Steve Tovar, nose tackle Greg Smith and safety Roger Harper. The Iowa honorees were tight end Alan Cross, defensive lineman Mike Wells, and defensive back Carlos James. Iowa center Mike Devlin was also recognized as the Big Ten Offensive Lineman of the Year.

Northwestern's Lee Gissendaner was selected as a first-team receiver after leading the conference with 68 receptions and 846 receiving yards.

== Offensive selections ==
=== Quarterbacks ===
- Elvis Grbac, Michigan (AP-1)
- Jason Verduzco, Illinois (AP-2)

=== Running backs ===
- Tico Duckett, Michigan State (AP-1)
- Tyrone Wheatley, Michigan (AP-1)
- Robert Smith, Ohio State (AP-2)
- Craig Thomas, Michigan State (AP-2)

=== Receivers ===
- Derrick Alexander, Michigan (AP-1)
- Lee Gissendaner, Northwestern (AP-1)
- Danan Hughes, Iowa (AP-2)
- Thomas Lewis, Indiana (AP-2)

=== Tight ends ===
- Alan Cross, Iowa (AP-1)
- Mitch Lyons, Michigan State (AP-2)
- Tony McGee, Michigan

=== Centers ===
- Steve Everitt, Michigan (AP-1)
- Mike Devlin, Iowa (AP-2)

=== Guards ===
- Chuck Belin, Wisconsin (AP-1)
- Joe Cocozzo, Michigan (AP-1)
- Toby Heaton, Michigan State (AP-2)
- Doug Skene, Michigan (AP-2)

=== Tackles ===
- Rob Doherty, Michigan (AP-1)
- Brad Hopkins, Illinois (AP-1)
- Scott Davis, Iowa (AP-2)
- Korey Stringer, Ohio State (AP-2)

== Defensive selections ==
=== Defensive linemen/outside linebackers ===
- Chris Hutchinson, Michigan (AP-1)
- Lamark Shackerford, Wisconsin (AP-1)
- Greg Smith, Ohio State (AP-1)
- Mike Wells, Iowa (AP-1)
- Jeff Zgonina, Purdue (AP-1)
- Dennis Cappella, Minnesota (AP-2)
- Matt Dyson, Michigan (AP-2)
- Hurvin McCormack, Indiana (AP-2)
- Simeon Rice, Illinois (AP-2)
- Jason Simmons, Ohio State (AP-2)
- Dan Wilkinson, Ohio State

=== Linebackers ===
- Eric Beatty, Purdue (AP-1)
- Gary Casper, Wisconsin (AP-1)
- Steve Tovar, Ohio State (AP-1)
- Ty Hallock, Michigan State (AP-2)
- Dana Howard, Illinois (AP-2)
- Steve Morrison, Michigan (AP-2)

=== Defensive backs ===
- Corwin Brown, Michigan (AP-1)
- Roger Harper, Ohio State (AP-1)
- Carlos James, Iowa (AP-1)
- Mike Middleton, Indiana (AP-2)
- Scott Nelson, Wisconsin (AP-2)
- Jimmy Young, Purdue (AP-2)
- Shonte Peoples, Michigan

== Special teams ==
=== Kickers ===
- Rich Thompson, Wisconsin (AP-1)
- Scott Bonnell, Indiana (AP-2)

=== Punters ===
- Jim DiGuilio, Indiana (AP-1)
- Sam Veit, Wisconsin (AP-2)

== Other ==
=== Offensive Player of the Year ===
- Tyrone Wheatley, Michigan (AP)

=== Defensive Player of the Year ===
- Jeff Zgonina, Purdue (AP)

=== Freshman of the Year ===
- Simeon Rice, Illinois (AP)

=== Coach of the Year ===
- Gary Moeller, Michigan (AP)

== Key ==
AP = Associated Press

== See also ==
- 1992 College Football All-America Team
