= Leroy Hoard =

American football player (born 1968)

No. 33, 44
- Positions: Running back, fullback

Personal information
- Born: May 15, 1968 (age 58); New Orleans, Louisiana, U.S.
- Listed height: 5 ft 11 in (1.80 m)
- Listed weight: 225 lb (102 kg)

Career information
- High school: St. Augustine (New Orleans)
- College: Michigan
- NFL draft: 1990: 2nd round, 45th overall pick

Career history
- Cleveland Browns (1990–1995); Baltimore Ravens (1996); Carolina Panthers (1996); Minnesota Vikings (1996–1999)

Awards and highlights
- Pro Bowl (1994); Rose Bowl (1988); Rose Bowl Most Valuable Player (1988)

Career NFL statistics
- Rushing yards: 3,964
- Receiving yards: 2,430
- Touchdowns: 51
- Stats at Pro Football Reference

Leroy J. Hoard (born May 15, 1968) is an American former professional football player who was a running back in the National Football League (NFL) for 10 seasons for the Cleveland Browns from 1990 to 1995 and the Minnesota Vikings from 1996 to 1999. He also played briefly for the Carolina Panthers (three games) and Baltimore Ravens (two games) during the 1996 NFL season. In a 10-year NFL career, Hoard appeared in 144 games, totaled 3,964 rushing yards and 2,430 receiving yards and scored 51 touchdowns.

Hoard also played college football as a fullback and tailback for the Michigan Wolverines from 1987 to 1989. After rushing for 146 yards and two touchdowns against USC, he was selected as the most valuable player in the 1989 Rose Bowl. Hoard gained 1,706 rushing yards on 314 carries (5.4 yards per carry), caught 30 passes for 199 yards, and scored 19 touchdowns at Michigan. He was selected by Cleveland in the second round of the 1990 NFL draft,

== Early life ==
Hoard was born in New Orleans, Louisiana, in 1968. He attended St. Augustine High School in New Orleans.

== University of Michigan ==
Hoard enrolled at the University of Michigan in 1986 and played college football for head coach Bo Schembechler's Michigan Wolverines football teams from 1987 to 1989. He started one game at fullback in 1987 but was otherwise a backup to Jarrod Bunch and Jamie Morris.

As a sophomore, Hoard started six games at fullback and one game at tailback for the 1988 Michigan Wolverines football team that compiled a 9-2-1 record, won the Big Ten Conference championship, defeated USC in the 1989 Rose Bowl, and finished the season ranked No. 4 in the final AP Poll. The highlight of Hoard's college career was being named most valuable player of the 1989 Rose Bowl, after rushing for 146 yards and two touchdowns in Michigan's win over USC. He also rushed for 165 yards and two touchdowns in the 1988 Michigan-Ohio State game. For the entire 1988 season, Hoard rushed for 752 yards and 11 touchdowns.

As a junior, Hoard started five games at fullback and three games at tailback for the 1989 Michigan team that compiled a 10–2 record, won a second consecutive Big Ten championship, lost to USC in the 1990 Rose Bowl (despite 108 rushing yards from Hoard), and finished the season ranked No. 7 in the final AP Poll. Hoard rushed for 832 yards and six touchdowns during the 1989 season.

Hoard decided to forgo his last season of college eligibility and enter the NFL draft.

== Professional career ==
=== Cleveland Browns ===
Hoard was selected by the Cleveland Browns in the second round (45th overall pick) of the 1990 NFL draft. He played six seasons for the Browns from 1990 to 1995, appearing in 90 games, including 54 as a starter. During the 1991 NFL season, Hoard appeared in all 16 games for the Browns (nine as a starter) and compiled 721 combined receiving and rushing yards and 11 touchdowns. He continued with strong performances in 1992 (546 rushing/receiving yards) and 1993 (578 rushing/receiving yards). He had his best season in 1994, rushing for 890 yards, catching 45 passes for 445 yards, and scoring nine touchdowns. He was also selected to play in the 1995 Pro Bowl. In his final year with the Browns, Hoard had another strong season with 850 combined rushing/receiving yards.

=== Ravens and Panthers ===
The Browns became the Baltimore Ravens in 1996, but Hoard was released in late September after appearing in two games for the Ravens with 61 rushing yards on 15 carries.

One week after being released by the Ravens, Hoard signed with the Carolina Panthers to replace the injured Tshimanga Biakabutuka. He appeared in three games for the Panthers, all as a backup, and carried the ball only five times for 11 yards. He was released by the Panthers in late October 1996.

=== Minnesota Vikings ===
On November 5, 1996, after an injury to Minnesota Vikings running back Robert Smith, Hoard signed with the Vikings. He immediately became a starter for the Vikings, starting the last six games of the 1996 season with 420 rushing yards, 129 receiving yards and three touchdowns. Pleased with Hoard's performance, the Vikings, in March 1997, signed Hoard to a two-year contract at $1.6 million.

Hoard remained with the Vikings through the 1999 NFL season. He had some of his best years with the Vikings. In 1998, he had 667 combined rushing/receiving yards and scored nine rushing touchdowns and one receiving touchdown. He also was responsible for the longest conversion in NFL history, gaining 52 yards on an 3rd and 37 draw play vs the Denver Broncos. In 1999, he scored a career-high 10 rushing touchdowns and finished the year with 721 combined rushing/receiving yards. He also had a career-high three touchdowns in the Vikings' 41–21 victory over the Arizona Cardinals in the 1998–99 NFL playoffs.

Hoard was known as a "goal-line" running back who excelled at breaking through an opposing defense's goal-line defenses. Regarding his skills, Hoard reportedly once said to his coach, "Coach, if you need one yard, I'll get you three yards. If you need five yards, I'll get you three yards."

== NFL career statistics ==
Legend
**Bold**	Career high

=== Regular season ===
Year	Team	Games		Rushing					Receiving				
Year	Team	GP	GS	Att	Yds	Avg	Lng	TD	Rec	Yds	Avg	Lng	TD
1990	CLE	14	5	58	149	2.6	42	3	10	73	7.3	17	0
1991	CLE	**16**	9	37	154	4.2	52	2	**48**	**567**	11.8	**71**	**9**
1992	CLE	**16**	9	54	236	**4.4**	37	0	26	310	11.9	46	1
1993	CLE	**16**	7	56	227	4.1	30	0	35	351	10.0	41	0
1994	CLE	**16**	**12**	**209**	**890**	4.3	39	5	45	445	9.9	65	4
1995	CLE	12	**12**	136	547	4.0	25	0	13	103	7.9	24	0
1996	BAL	2	1	15	61	4.1	10	0	1	4	4.0	4	0
1996	CAR	3	0	5	11	2.2	5	0	0	0	0.0	0	0
1996	MIN	6	6	105	420	4.0	25	3	10	129	**12.9**	37	0
1997	MIN	12	1	80	235	2.9	20	4	11	84	7.6	30	0
1998	MIN	**16**	1	115	479	4.2	50	9	22	198	9.0	24	1
1999	MIN	15	3	138	555	4.0	**53**	**10**	17	166	9.8	29	0
		144	66	1,008	3,964	3.9	53	36	238	2,430	10.2	71	15

=== Playoffs ===
Year	Team	Games		Rushing					Receiving				
Year	Team	GP	GS	Att	Yds	Avg	Lng	TD	Rec	Yds	Avg	Lng	TD
1994	CLE	**2**	0	**20**	**74**	3.7	10	1	2	30	**15.0**	**25**	0
1996	MIN	1	0	3	21	**7.0**	**12**	0	1	7	7.0	7	0
1997	MIN	**2**	0	8	25	3.1	6	1	1	9	9.0	9	0
1998	MIN	**2**	0	17	54	3.2	11	**2**	**4**	**39**	9.8	16	**1**
1999	MIN	**2**	0	13	55	4.2	10	1	2	15	7.5	10	0
		9	0	61	229	3.8	12	5	10	100	10.0	25	1

== Broadcasting career ==
=== 790 The Ticket (WAXY) ===
Leroy Hoard was part of the morning drive radio show on WAXY 790 AM in South Florida with Brendan Tobin from 6 AM to 10 AM EST until September 2022. The show was formerly on from 1 PM to 3 PM.

=== 560 WQAM ===
Starting in October 2022, the radio show was moved to WQAM and changed to a 10 AM to 2PM schedule.
