= Frank Hartley (American football) =

American football player (born 1967)

No. 48, 89
- Position: Tight end

Personal information
- Born: December 15, 1967 (age 58); Chicago, Illinois, U.S.
- Listed height: 6 ft 2 in (1.88 m)
- Listed weight: 268 lb (122 kg)

Career information
- High school: Bogan (Chicago)
- College: Illinois
- NFL draft: 1991: undrafted

Career history
- Los Angeles Rams (1991–1992)*; San Francisco 49ers (1992)*; Atlanta Falcons (1993)*; Cleveland Browns (1994–1995); Baltimore Ravens (1996); San Diego Chargers (1997–1998); Denver Broncos (2000)*
- * Offseason or practice squad member only

Awards and highlights
- Second-team All-Big Ten (1989)

Career NFL statistics
- Receptions: 35
- Receiving yards: 424
- Touchdowns: 3
- Stats at Pro Football Reference

Frank Hartley (born December 15, 1967) is an American former professional football player who was a tight end for five seasons in the National Football League (NFL) with the Cleveland Browns, Baltimore Ravens, and San Diego Chargers.

He played college football for the Illinois Fighting Illini.
