= Robert Anderson (sex offender) =

American sexual abuser

- Born: February 20, 1928; L'Anse, Michigan, U.S.
- Died: November 27, 2008 (aged 80); Ann Arbor, Michigan, U.S.
- Education: University of Michigan
- Occupation: Physician
- Years active: 1953–2003
- Employer(s): University of Michigan, Federal Aviation Administration
- Known for: Being a prolific sexual abuser

Robert Anderson (February 20, 1928 – November 27, 2008) was an American doctor and sexual abuser. In 2022, the University of Michigan agreed to a $490 million settlement to 1,050 victims who were abused by Anderson during routine medical examinations. Attorneys for Anderson's victims say this may have been the largest case of sex abuse by a single person in American history, surpassing the scale of similar cases such as that of Larry Nassar and the Ohio State University abuse scandal.

== Life and career ==
Anderson was born on February 20, 1928, in L'Anse, Michigan, and graduated from high school as valedictorian. He graduated from Michigan State University in 1950, and went on to get his medical degree from the University of Michigan School of Medicine in 1953. He did a residency at the University of Michigan Hospital before moving to a private practice until 1966, when he began working at the university's health center, and also began to work for the university's athletic department in 1968, and was made director of the health center that same year. Anderson also did physicals for pilots, air traffic controllers, and others involved in aviation while working for the FAA.

During Anderson's era, sports medicine was a new field, and he lobbied the coaches to make physical examinations a requirement for athletes. After LGBT activists reported his alleged rapes, Vice President of Student Life Tom Easthope forced his resignation from the health center, but unknown to Easthope, he continued to work for the athletic department. Anderson retired from the athletic department in 1998, left the university in 2003, and died in 2008.

== Sexual assault allegations ==
During his long career with the University of Michigan, Anderson sexually assaulted and raped patients during medical examinations, subjecting them to unnecessary genital and rectal examinations. Although he occasionally sexually assaulted female patients, 90% of his victims were male. 40% of his victims were black, and NFL linebacker Jon Vaughn claimed that Anderson collected semen from him to create the "perfect black athlete". Anderson was widely known for sexually abusing patients among Michigan staff and athletes, earning nicknames such as "Dr. Drop Your Drawers Anderson". A report commissioned by the university after his death found that more than two dozen officials knew about Anderson's behavior, including athletic director Don Canham and legendary football coach Bo Schembechler, whose own son was raped by Anderson. Anderson also was reported to have raped pilots, air traffic controllers, and other employees of the FAA when he worked there. The total number of sexual assaults reported against Anderson was over 2,100.

The allegations were not publicly known until years after Anderson's death. Following letters written to athletic director Warde Manuel in 2018 and 2020, an internal investigation against Anderson was opened, which found that the university failed to take action against Anderson multiple times. After several years in a legal stalemate, the university reached a $490 million settlement in January 2022 with 1,050 victims.
