= Steve Everitt =

American football player (born 1970)

No. 61, 60
- Position: Center

Personal information
- Born: August 21, 1970 (age 56); Miami, Florida, U.S.
- Listed height: 6 ft 5 in (1.96 m)
- Listed weight: 310 lb (141 kg)

Career information
- High school: Miami Southridge
- College: Michigan (1989–1992)
- NFL draft: 1993: 1st round, 14th overall pick

Career history
- Cleveland Browns (1993–1995); Baltimore Ravens (1996); Philadelphia Eagles (1997–1999); St. Louis Rams (2000)

Awards and highlights
- PFWA All-Rookie Team (1993); Second-team All-American (1992); First-team All-Big Ten (1992); Second-team All-Big Ten (1991)

Career NFL statistics
- Games played: 103
- Games started: 98
- Fumble recoveries: 5
- Stats at Pro Football Reference

Steven Michael Everitt (born August 21, 1970) is an American former professional football player who was a center in the National Football League (NFL). He played college football for the Michigan Wolverines from 1989 to 1992. He played professional football as a center and offensive guard in the NFL for seven seasons, including 46 games for the Cleveland Browns from 1993 to 1995 and 45 games for the Philadelphia Eagles from 1997 to 1999.

== Early life ==
Everitt was born in Miami, Florida, in 1970. He attended Southridge High School in Miami. He graduated in 1988 and is part of their "Hall of Fame".

== University of Michigan ==
Everitt enrolled at the University of Michigan in 1988 and played college football as a center for the Michigan Wolverines football teams from 1989 to 1992. As a freshman, Everitt started all 12 games at center for the 1989 Michigan Wolverines football team that compiled a 10–2 record in Bo Schembechler's last season as Michigan's head coach. He then shared the starting center role with Matt Elliott during the 1990 and 1991 seasons. As a senior, he started all 12 games for the undefeated 1992 Michigan team that compiled a 9-0-3 record, outscored opponents 389–198, and defeated Washington in the 1993 Rose Bowl. He was selected as a first-team player on the 1992 All-Big Ten Conference football team.

== Professional football ==
Pre-draft measurables
Height	Weight	Arm length	Hand span	40-yard dash	10-yard split	20-yard split	20-yard shuttle	Vertical jump	Broad jump	Bench press
6 ft 4 5/8 in (1.95 m)	290 lb (132 kg)	32 7/8 in (0.84 m)	10 in (0.25 m)	5.03 s	1.77 s	2.93 s	4.33 s	25.0 in (0.64 m)	9 ft 0 in (2.74 m)	25 reps
All values from NFL Combine

Everitt was selected by the Cleveland Browns in the first round with 14th overall pick of the 1993 NFL draft. He played three seasons for the Browns from 1993 to 1995, appearing in 46 games, including 45 games at the team's starting center. After the Browns moved to Baltimore in 1996 Everitt was fined $5,000 by the league for wearing a Browns bandana with his Ravens uniform, which he did in protest of the team's relocation . He appeared in eight games for the Ravens in 1996.

In March 1997, Everitt signed a five-year $11.5 million contract with the Philadelphia Eagles. He spent three years with the Eagles, appearing in 45 games as the team's starting center. In April 2000, Everitt was released by the Eagles.

In June 2000, Everitt signed a two-year contract with the St. Louis Rams. He appeared in only four games for the Rams, one as a starter, and all during the 2000 NFL season.

In eight years in the NFL, Everitt appeared in 103 games, 98 of them as a starter, and registered five fumble recoveries.
