= Julian High School (Chicago) =

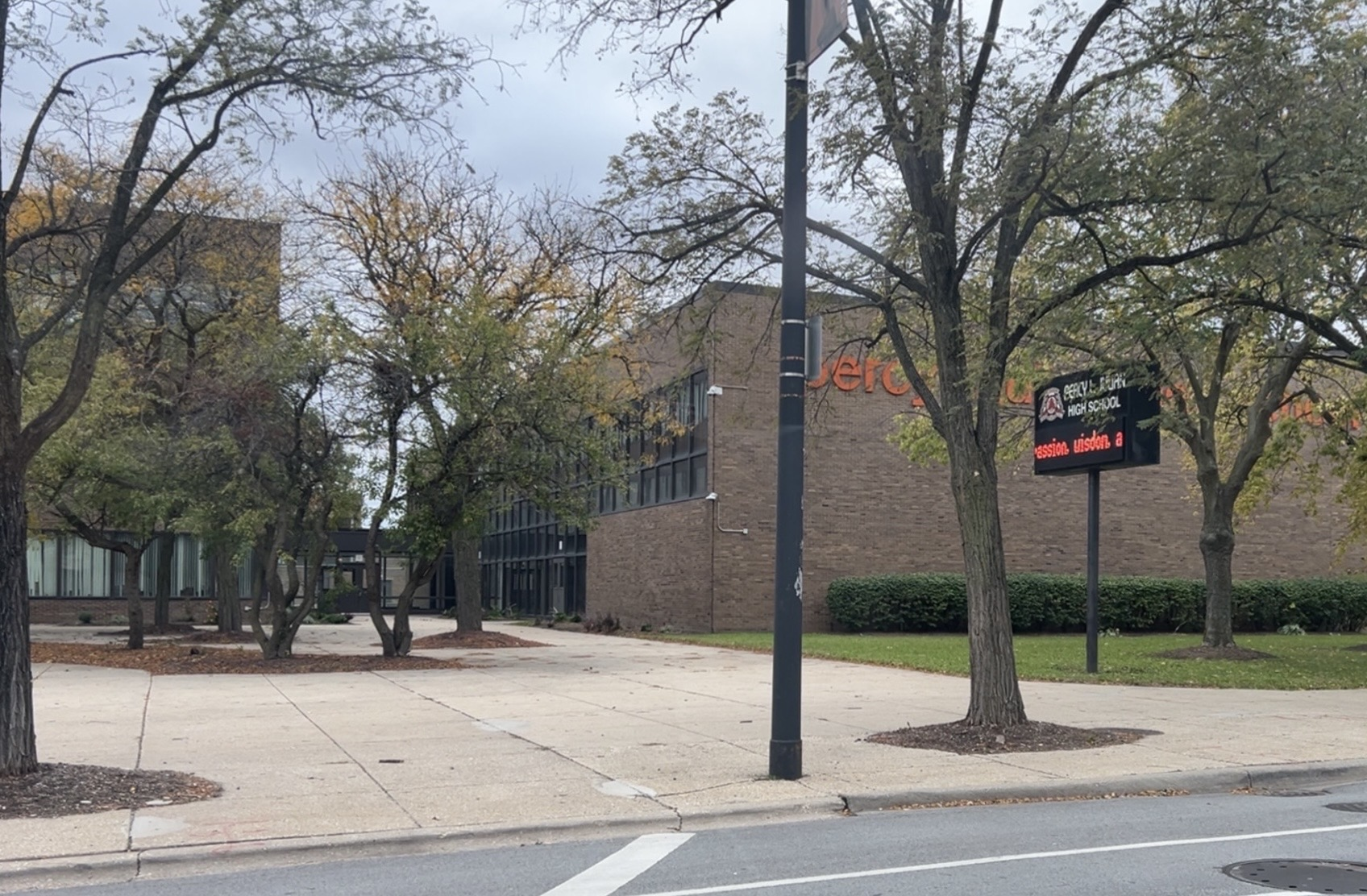

Location
- 10330 S. Elizabeth Street; Chicago, Illinois 60643; United States; 41.7060°N 87.6545°W

Information
- School type: Public; Secondary
- Motto: Heart. Head. Hand
- Opened: 1975
- School district: Chicago Public Schools
- CEEB code: 141073
- Principal: Lawrence P. Spaulding
- Teaching staff: 35.5
- Grades: 9–12
- Gender: Coed
- Enrollment: 381 (2025–2026)
- Campus type: Urban
- Colors: Orange and brown
- Athletics conference: Chicago Public League
- Team name: Jaguars
- Accreditation: North Central Association of Colleges and Schools
- Yearbook: Catalyst
- Website: pljulianhs.net

Percy Lavon Julian High School is a public 4–year high school located in the Washington Heights neighborhood on the far south side of Chicago, Illinois, United States. Opened in September 1975, Julian is a part of the Chicago Public Schools district. Julian is named for African-American research chemist Percy Lavon Julian (1899–1975).

== History ==
Julian was officially established in August 1974 when community members requested to James F. Redmond, General Superintendent of Chicago Schools and the Chicago Board of Education that two new schools were needed to relieve overcrowding at two area schools, Harlan and Fenger during the 1970–1971 school year. The school board approved the requested and construction on Julian began in November 1974.

Designed by Chicago native and architect Myron Goldsmith (who also designed the other school proposed in the request a year prior, Corliss High School; which shares a similar design to Julian), the school was constructed over two phases between November 1974 through May 1975. Prior to its construction and opening, the school was often referred to as the 103rd and Dan Ryan Site High School by city and school officials.

The school opened for students on September 3, 1975 and was renamed after Percy Lavon Julian by the school's founding principal Dr. Edward H. Oliver. Oliver served as principal of the school from its opening in 1975 until June 1991; the longest to serve as principal of Julian.

=== Other information ===
On May 10, 2007, 16-year-old Blair Holt, a student at the school, was tragically shot and killed on a CTA bus shortly after boarding, caught in a gang-related shooting. His death brought national attention to the rampant gun violence in Chicago. In 2017, an honorary street sign was placed in front of the school to honor his memory. On October 22, 2013, twenty–nine students were arrested and charged with mob action after a fight involving a large group took place at the school. The fight was believed to be between members of rival street gangs.

== Athletics ==
Julian competes in the Chicago Public League (CPL) and is a member of the Illinois High School Association (IHSA). The school sport teams are nicknamed the Jaguars. The boys' wrestling team became public league champions and Class AA qualifiers two times (1981–82, 1986–87). The girls' basketball team became regional champions during the 2003–04 season. The boys' basketball team were regional champions and Class AA qualifiers three times (2002–03, 2003–04, 2004–05).

== Notable alumni ==
- Ousmane Barro – (class of 2004), basketball player
- Corwin Brown – (class of 1988), NFL football player, (New England Patriots).
- Jason Burns (attended) – NFL football player, (Cincinnati Bengals).
- Sean Dockery – (class of 2002), IBL basketball player, Edmonton Chill.
- Howard Griffith – (class of 1986), NFL two-time Super Bowl champ with the Denver Broncos.
- Byron Irvin – (class of 1984), NBA basketball player, Washington Bullets.
- Walt Lemon Jr. – (class of 2010), NBA basketball player, (Chicago Bulls, New Orleans Pelicans), Israel Basketball Premier League
- BJ the Chicago Kid (Bryan Sledge) – (class of 2003), singer-songwriter.
- Danny Walters – (class of 1978), NFL football player, (San Diego Chargers).
- Chris Washington – (class of 1979), NFL football player, (Tampa Bay Buccaneers)
