= Steve Tovar =

American football player and coach (born 1970)

No. 51, 58, 56, 55, 59
- Position: Linebacker

Personal information
- Born: April 25, 1970 (age 56); Elyria, Ohio, U.S.
- Listed height: 6 ft 3 in (1.91 m)
- Listed weight: 246 lb (112 kg)

Career information
- High school: West (Elyria)
- College: Ohio State (1989–1992)
- NFL draft: 1993: 3rd round, 59th overall pick

Career history

Playing
- Cincinnati Bengals (1993–1997); San Diego Chargers (1998); Carolina Panthers (1999); San Diego Chargers (2000)

Coaching
- Army (2004–2005) Linebackers coach; Miami Dolphins (2006) Defensive assistant coach; Kansas (2007–2008) Linebackers coach

Awards and highlights
- PFWA NFL All-Rookie Team (1993); 2× First-team All-American (1991, 1992); Big Ten Co-Defensive Player of the Year (1992); 3× First-team All-Big Ten (1990–1992)

Career NFL statistics
- Total tackles: 525
- Sacks: 8
- Forced fumbles: 6
- Fumble recoveries: 3
- Interceptions: 7
- Interception yards: 69
- Stats at Pro Football Reference

Steven Eric Tovar (born April 25, 1970) is an American former football player and coach. He played professionally as a linebacker in the National Football League (NFL) for eight seasons with the Cincinnati Bengals, the San Diego Chargers and the Carolina Panthers. He played college football for the Ohio State Buckeyes and was selected by the Bengals in the third round (59th overall) of the 1993 NFL draft.

== College career ==
Tovar played at the Ohio State University from 1989 to 1992. Tovar was the first of 21 players recruited by Buckeyes head coach John Cooper to earn All-America status at Ohio State. He led Ohio State in tackles for three-consecutive seasons between 1990 and 1992, and currently ranks fourth in school history with 414 total tackles and 239 solo tackles. In his senior year, Tovar was named Big Ten Defensive Player of the Year (selected by the conference coaches) after recording 128 tackles. He was three-time All-Big Ten selection, and a twice first-team All-American selection in 1991 and 1992. As a senior, Tovar was elected team co-captain alongside quarterback Kirk Herbstreit.

Tovar was inducted into the Ohio State Varsity O Hall of Fame in 2001.

== Professional career ==
Tovar was selected in the third round (59th overall) by the Cincinnati Bengals in the 1993 NFL draft. He had an eight-year career in the National Football League (NFL), playing five years with the Bengals, two with the San Diego Chargers, and one with the Carolina Panthers.

== Coaching career ==
=== Army Black Knights ===
Tovar spent the 2004 and 2005 football seasons with the Army Black Knights as the linebackers coach, under head coach Bobby Ross.

=== Miami Dolphins ===
In 2006 he joined the Miami Dolphins staff under head coach Nick Saban as a defensive assistant coach.

=== Kansas Jayhawks ===
In 2007, Tovar joined the coaching staff of the Kansas Jayhawks under head coach Mark Mangino as the linebackers coach. Following the 2008 season, on January 10, 2009, Tovar resigned and was replaced by Bill Miller.
