= Jeff Zgonina =

American football player and coach (born 1970)

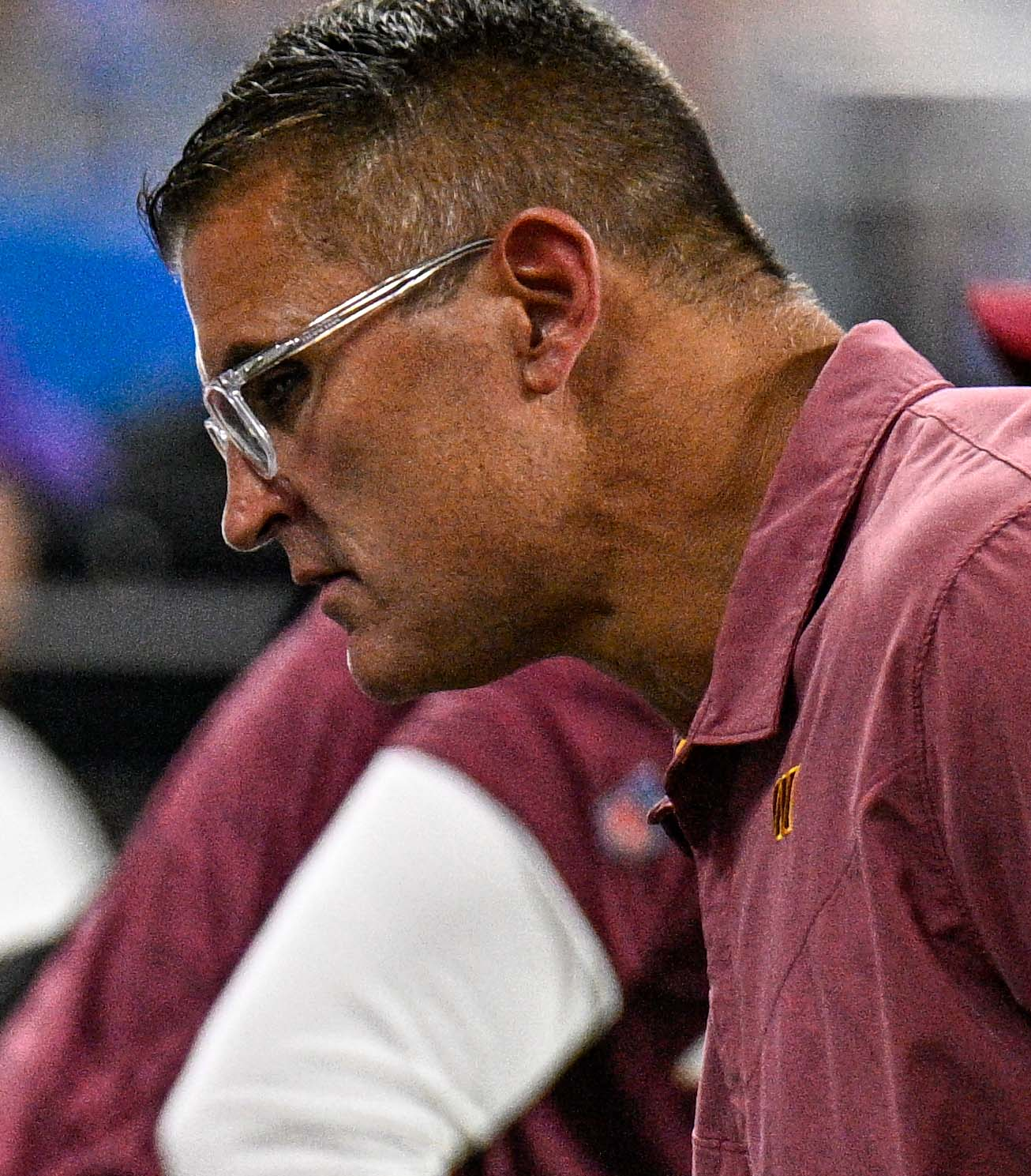
- Zgonina with the Washington Commanders in 2022

St. Louis Battlehawks
- Title: Defensive line coach

Personal information
- Born: May 24, 1970 (age 56); Chicago, Illinois, U.S.
- Listed height: 6 ft 1 in (1.85 m)
- Listed weight: 281 lb (127 kg)

Career information
- Position: Defensive tackle (No. 90, 74, 92)
- High school: Carmel (Mundelein, Illinois)
- College: Purdue (1989–1992)
- NFL draft: 1993: 7th round, 185th overall pick

Career history

Playing
- Pittsburgh Steelers (1993–1994); Carolina Panthers (1995); Atlanta Falcons (1996); St. Louis Rams (1997); Oakland Raiders (1998); Indianapolis Colts (1998); St. Louis Rams (1999–2002); Miami Dolphins (2003–2006); Houston Texans (2007–2009)

Coaching
- Houston Texans (2013) Assistant defensive line coach; New York Giants (2016) Assistant defensive line coach; San Francisco 49ers (2017–2018) Defensive line coach; Washington Football Team (2020–2021) Assistant defensive line coach; Washington Commanders (2022–2023) Defensive line coach; Dallas Cowboys (2024) Defensive line coach; St. Louis Battlehawks (2026–present) Defensive line

Awards and highlights
- As a player: Super Bowl champion (XXXIV); Third-team All-American (1992); Big Ten Co-Defensive Player of the Year (1992); First-team All-Big Ten (1992); 2× Second-team All-Big Ten (1990, 1991)

Career NFL statistics
- Tackles: 458
- Sacks: 26
- Forced fumbles: 3
- Fumble recoveries: 13
- Interceptions: 1
- Stats at Pro Football Reference

Jeffrey Marc Zgonina (/skəˈninə/ skə-NEE-nə; born May 24, 1970) is an American football coach and former player. He currently serves as the defensive line coach for the St. Louis Battlehawks of the United Football League (UFL). He played as a defensive tackle in the National Football League (NFL) for 17 seasons. He played college football for the Purdue Boilermakers and was selected by the Pittsburgh Steelers in the seventh round of the 1993 NFL draft.

Zgonina was a member of the St. Louis Rams that won Super Bowl XXXIV and also played for the Carolina Panthers, Atlanta Falcons, Indianapolis Colts, Miami Dolphins, and Houston Texans. As a coach, he has been a member of the Houston Texans, New York Giants, San Francisco 49ers, and Washington Commanders.

== High school ==
Zgonina attended Carmel High School in Mundelein and was a letterman in football, basketball, hockey, and track and field. In football, he won All-East Suburban Catholic Conference honors, All-Area honors, All-County honors, and All-State honors.

== College career ==
Zgonina attended Purdue University from 1989 to 1992, starting his entire career. He twice led the Boilermakers in sacks and tackles for loss, he led the team in total tackles one season. He had a fumble return of 67 yards, a record for Purdue defensive linemen. He currently holds Purdue records for 'tackles for loss' for a single game (7.0), a season (28.0) and a career (72.0). He is currently #6 in total tackles (382) and solo tackles (266); and #3 in sacks (29.0). His senior season was outstanding as he had 28 tackles for loss and 13 sacks; was selected as a 1st Team All-Big Ten and the Big Ten Defensive Player of the Year. Following his senior year, he participated in the 1993 East-West Shrine Game, Hula Bowl, and Japan Bowl.

== Professional career ==
Pre-draft measurables
Height	Weight	Arm length	Hand span	40-yard dash	10-yard split	20-yard split	20-yard shuttle	Vertical jump	Broad jump	Bench press
6 ft 0 3/4 in (1.85 m)	285 lb (129 kg)	33 5/8 in (0.85 m)	9 1/8 in (0.23 m)	4.94 s	1.70 s	2.85 s	4.40 s	32.0 in (0.81 m)	9 ft 1 in (2.77 m)	30 reps
All values from NFL Combine

Zgonina played 17 seasons in the NFL and spent more time with the St. Louis Rams than with any other team, which included a Super Bowl title in the 1999 season (XXXIV). His best season, however, came with the Miami Dolphins in 2004, when he recorded 63 tackles and five sacks.

He was drafted by the Pittsburgh Steelers in the seventh round of the 1993 NFL draft. He spent two seasons with the Steelers, recording 27 tackles in 21 game appearances before being waived after the 1994 season. He was claimed off waivers by the Carolina Panthers on August 29, 1995, and he recorded two tackles in two game appearance for the Panthers in 1995. He signed with the Atlanta Falcons in 1996, and made one sack, one fumble recovery, and 12 tackles in the eight games he played. Zgonina signed a two-year contract with the St. Louis Rams on March 12, 1997. He played in 15 games in 1997, producing two sacks and 21 tackles. He was released by the Rams on August 21, 1998. Zgonina was signed by the Oakland Raiders on October 14, 1998, but was released six days later. before playing in a game for the Raiders. He signed with the Indianapolis Colts later in the season and played in two games.

Zgonina re-signed with the Rams on March 27, 1999. He spent four seasons with the Rams, becoming their starting defensive tackle during the 2000 season. He earned a Super Bowl ring in 2000 after St. Louis beat the Tennessee Titans in Super Bowl XXXIV. He was also a member of the 2001 NFC Champion Rams, starting 13 games and playing in Super Bowl XXXVI. He recorded 144 tackles, 10.5 sacks, three forced fumbles, and six fumble recoveries in his second tenure with the Rams.

Zgonina signed a four-year contract with the Miami Dolphins on April 1, 2003. In his four-year career with the Dolphins, he made 178 tackles, 10 sacks, an interception, and two fumble recoveries in 62 games (22 starts). He signed with the Houston Texans on March 14, 2007, He had 64 tackles, 2.5 sacks, and two fumble recoveries in his three-year tenure, including playing in all 48 games with five starts.

== Coaching career ==
=== Houston Texans ===
In 2013, the Houston Texans hired Zgonina to become an assistant defensive line coach. As an assistant coach for the Texans, he worked closely with defensive line coach/assistant head coach Bill Kollar who was his coach at Purdue University in 1989.

=== New York Giants ===
In 2016, he became the assistant defensive line coach of the New York Giants.

=== San Francisco 49ers ===
Zgonina was the defensive line coach of the San Francisco 49ers from 2017 to 2019.

=== Washington Football Team / Commanders ===
In 2020, he was hired as the assistant defensive line coach for the Washington Football Team and was promoted to lead defensive line coach following the firing of Sam Mills III in 2022. He was not retained by the Commanders following the firing of head coach Ron Rivera.

=== Dallas Cowboys ===
In February 2024, the Dallas Cowboys hired Zgonina as their defensive line coach under defensive coordinator Mike Zimmer. He was not retained by the Cowboys after the conclusion of the 24–25 season.

== Personal life ==
Zgonina is of Polish descent. He has participated in dog shows since 2014. He is the uncle of Chicago Bears tight end Cole Kmet.
