= Jason Burns =

American football player (born 1972)

No. 38
- Position: Running back

Personal information
- Born: November 27, 1972 (age 53); Chicago, Illinois, U.S.
- Listed height: 5 ft 11 in (1.80 m)
- Listed weight: 178 lb (81 kg)

Career information
- High school: Julian (Chicago)
- College: Wisconsin
- NFL draft: 1995: undrafted

Career history
- Cincinnati Bengals (1995)

Career NFL statistics
- Rushing yards: 1
- Rushing average: 1
- Stats at Pro Football Reference

Jason Burns (born November 27, 1972) is an American former professional football player who was a running back for the Cincinnati Bengals of the National Football League (NFL) in [1995. He played college football for the Wisconsin Badgers. Burns attended Percy L. Julian High School in Chicago, Illinois. He played at the collegiate level with the Wisconsin Badgers.
