= Chris Thome =

American football player (born 1969)

No. 67
- Position: Center

Personal information
- Born: January 15, 1969 (age 57); St. Cloud, Minnesota, U.S.
- Listed height: 6 ft 4 in (1.93 m)
- Listed weight: 278 lb (126 kg)

Career information
- High school: Saint Thomas Academy (Mendota Heights, Minnesota)
- College: Minnesota
- NFL draft: 1991: 5th round, 119th overall pick

Career history
- Minnesota Vikings (1991)*; Cleveland Browns (1991–1992); New York Giants (1992); Kansas City Chiefs (1993)
- * Offseason or practice squad member only

Awards and highlights
- First-team All-Big Ten (1990)

Career NFL statistics
- Games played: 11
- Stats at Pro Football Reference

Chris Thome (born January 15, 1969) is an American former professional football player who was a center in the National Football League (NFL). He played college football for the Minnesota Golden Gophers and was selected by the Minnesota Vikings in the fifth round of the 1991 NFL draft with the 119th overall pick. He played for the Cleveland Browns from 1991 to 1992.
