= Greg Smith (American football, born 1970) =

American football player

Greg Smith (born c. 1970) was a walk-on to the Ohio State football team in 1988 after graduating from Glen Oak High School in Canton, Ohio. Greg earned a scholarship at Ohio State in 1990 and started at nose tackle during the 1991 and 1992 seasons. He was an Academic All-American in 1992. Smith earned All-Big Ten honors in 1992. Greg Smith played for the Ohio State Buckeyes between 1988 and 1992.

== Today ==
Dr. Greg Smith is an orthopedic surgeon and currently resides in Laguna Vista, Texas.
