= 1989 All-Big Ten Conference football team =

American college football all-star team

The 1989 All-Big Ten Conference football team consists of American football players chosen as All-Big Ten Conference players for the 1989 NCAA Division I-A football season.

== Offensive selections ==
=== Quarterbacks ===
- Jeff George, Illinois (AP-1; UPI-1)
- Michael Taylor, Michigan (AP-2)
- Greg Frey, Ohio State (UPI-2)

=== Running backs ===
- Anthony Thompson, Indiana (AP-1; UPI-1)
- Tony Boles, Michigan (AP-1; UPI-1)
- Darrell Thompson, Minnesota (AP-2; UPI-2)
- Rob Christian, Northwestern (AP-2)
- Blake Ezor, Michigan State (UPI-2)

=== Receivers ===
- Richard Buchanan, Northwestern (AP-1; UPI-2)
- Courtney Hawkins, Michigan State (AP-1; UPI-2)
- Greg McMurtry, Michigan (AP-2; UPI-1)
- Mike Bellamy, Illinois (AP-2; UPI-1)

=== Tight ends ===
- Derrick Walker, Michigan (AP-1; UPI-1)
- Duane Young, Michigan State (AP-2)
- Frank Hartley, Illinois (UPI-2)

=== Centers ===
- Curt Lovelace, Illinois (AP-1)
- Ron Vargo, Indiana (AP-2; UPI-1)
- Dan Beatty, Ohio State (UPI-2)

=== Guards ===
- Dean Dingman, Michigan (AP-1; UPI-1)
- Jeff Davidson, Ohio State (AP-1; UPI-2)
- Ian Beckles, Indiana (AP-2; UPI-1)
- Bill Anderson, Iowa (AP-2)
- Eric Moten, Michigan State (UPI-2)

=== Tackles ===
- Bob Kula, Michigan State (AP-1; UPI-1)
- Joe Staysniak, Ohio State (AP-1; UPI-1)
- Greg Skrepenak, Michigan (AP-2; UPI-2)
- Todd Oberdorf, Indiana (AP-2)
- Dan Liimatta, Minnesota (UPI-2)

== Defensive selections ==
=== Linemen/outside linebackers ===
- Mel Agee, Illinois (AP-1; UPI-1)
- Travis Davis, Michigan State (AP-1; UPI-1)
- Moe Gardner, Illinois (AP-1; UPI-1)
- Jim Johnson, Iowa (AP-1; UPI-1)
- Bobby Abrams, Michigan (AP-2)
- Matt Ruhland, Iowa (AP-2)
- Mike Sunvold, Minnesota (AP-2; UPI-2)
- Chris Hutchinson (AP-2)
- Mike Teeter, Michigan (UPI-2)
- Alonzo Spellman, Ohio State (UPI-2)
- Jeff Koeppel, Iowa (UPI-2)

=== Linebackers ===
- Darrick Brownlow, Illinois (AP-1; UPI-1)
- Brad Quast, Iowa (AP-1; UPI-1)
- Percy Snow, Michigan State (AP-1; UPI-1)
- Erick Anderson, Michigan (AP-2; UPI-2)
- J. J. Grant, Michigan (AP-2; UPI-2)
- Darrin Trieb, Purdue (AP-2; UPI-2)

=== Defensive backs ===
- Harlon Barnett, Michigan State (AP-1; UPI-1)
- Henry Jones, Illinois (AP-1; UPI-1)
- Tripp Welborne, Michigan (AP-1; UPI-1)
- Mike Dumas, Indiana (AP-1; UPI-2)
- Marlon Primous, Illinois (AP-2; UPI-1)
- Vada Murray, Michigan (AP-2; UPI-2)
- Chris Green, Illinois (AP-2)
- Merton Hanks, Iowa (AP-2)
- Zack Dumas, Ohio State (UPI-2)
- Derrick Kelson, Purdue (UPI-2)

== Special teams ==
=== Kickers ===
- J. D. Carlson, Michigan (AP-1; UPI-1)
- Brent Berglund, Minnesota (AP-2)
- John Langeloh, Michigan State (UPI-2)

=== Punters ===
- Shawn McCarthy, Purdue (AP-1; UPI-1)
- Josh Butland, Michigan State (AP-2; UPI-2)

== Other awards ==
- Most Valuable Player: Anthony Thompson, running back, Indiana (AP)
- Freshman of the Year: Eric Hunter, quarterback, Purdue (AP)

== Key ==
AP = Associated Press

UPI = United Press International

Bold = Consensus first-team selection of both the AP and UPI

== See also ==
- 1989 College Football All-America Team
