= Bret Johnson =

Canadian football player (born 1970)

Bret Johnson (born February 6, 1970) is a former Canadian football quarterback in the Canadian Football League who played for the Toronto Argonauts. He played college football for the UCLA Bruins and Michigan State Spartans.

His brother is former NFL quarterback Rob Johnson.
