= Corwin Brown =

American football player and coach (born 1970)

No. 30, 44
- Position: Safety

Personal information
- Born: April 25, 1970 (age 56); Chicago, Illinois, U.S.
- Listed height: 6 ft 1 in (1.85 m)
- Listed weight: 200 lb (91 kg)

Career information
- High school: Julian (Chicago)
- College: Michigan
- NFL draft: 1993: 4th round, 110th overall pick

Career history

Playing
- New England Patriots (1993–1996); New York Jets (1997–1998); Detroit Lions (1999–2000)

Coaching
- Virginia (2001–2003) Special teams coach (2001–2003); New York Jets (2004–2006) Defensive backs coach (2004-2006); Notre Dame (2007–2009) Defensive coordinator/ Outside linebackers coach (2007) Defensive coordinator/ Defensive backs coach (2008) Associate head coach/ Co-defensive coordinator/ Defensive backs coach (2009); New England Patriots (2010) Defensive backs coach (2010)

Awards and highlights
- First-team All-Big Ten (1992); Second-team All-Big Ten (1991)

Career NFL statistics
- Tackles: 189
- Interceptions: 3
- Forced fumbles: 3
- Stats at Pro Football Reference

Corwin Brown (born April 25, 1970) is an American football coach who was most recently the defensive backs coach for the New England Patriots of the National Football League (NFL). Following an eight-year career in the NFL as a safety from 1993–2000, Brown worked as an assistant coach for Virginia, the New York Jets, and Notre Dame before joining the Patriots.

== College career ==
After graduating from Julian High School in Chicago, Brown attended the University of Michigan, where he played football as a defensive back. He was a two-year starter, co-captain of the 1992 team, and All-Big Ten in 1992.

== Professional career ==
=== New England Patriots ===
Brown was selected in the fourth round (110th overall) in the 1993 NFL draft by the New England Patriots. He started a career-high 12 games at safety as a rookie, recording 56 tackles, also a career-high. He went on to play three more seasons for the Patriots and head coach Bill Parcells (and in 1996, secondary coach Bill Belichick), starting only two games over that span and picking up 38 tackles.

=== New York Jets ===
Brown followed Parcells and Belichick to the New York Jets in 1997, starting one game over two seasons and recording 29 tackles and one interception.

=== Detroit Lions ===
The final two years of Brown's career were spent with the Detroit Lions. After starting one game in 1999, Brown started four games in 2000, recording a half sack, two interceptions, and 21 tackles. He retired following the season at age 30.

== Coaching career ==
=== Virginia ===
Brown worked as a special teams coach under former Patriots and Jets assistant coach Al Groh at the University of Virginia from 2001 through 2003.

=== New York Jets ===
Brown joined the Jets as a defensive backs coach in 2004 under head coach Herman Edwards and spent three years with the team, including one under then-new head coach and former Patriots assistant Eric Mangini in 2006.

=== Notre Dame ===
On January 19, 2007, Brown was named the defensive coordinator and outside linebackers coach for the University of Notre Dame Fighting Irish under head coach and former Patriots assistant Charlie Weis. In 2008, Brown shifted his positional responsibilities to defensive backs. He was named associate head coach in 2009 while serving as co-defensive coordinator and defensive backs coach. Weis was fired by Notre Dame after the season and Brown did not return to the team.

=== New England Patriots ===
Following his tenure at Notre Dame, Bill Belichick hired Brown as a defensive backs coach in January 2010 to help incumbent defensive backs coach Josh Boyer with safeties. Brown was not retained after one season.

== Personal life ==
On August 12, 2011, a SWAT team descended on Brown's home in Granger, Indiana suburb of South Bend. Authorities heard shots fired inside the house. The original 911 call involved a domestic disturbance issue. He was hospitalized with a self-inflicted gunshot wound. He was sentenced to four years probation.

Sporting positions
Preceded by Rick Minter	Notre Dame Fighting Irish Defensive coordinator 2008	Succeeded by Jon Tenuta
