= Derrick Walker (American football) =

American football player (born 1967)

No. 89, 82, 86
- Position: Tight end

Personal information
- Born: June 23, 1967 (age 59); Glenwood, Illinois, U.S.
- Listed height: 6 ft 0 in (1.83 m)
- Listed weight: 246 lb (112 kg)

Career information
- High school: Bloom (Chicago Heights, Illinois)
- College: Michigan
- NFL draft: 1990: 6th round, 163rd overall pick

Career history
- San Diego Chargers (1990–1993); Kansas City Chiefs (1994–1997); Oakland Raiders (1999); Philadelphia Eagles (2001)*
- * Offseason or practice squad member only

Awards and highlights
- First-team All-Big Ten (1989)

Career NFL statistics
- Receptions: 180
- Receiving yards: 1,770
- Touchdowns: 9
- Stats at Pro Football Reference

Derrick Norval Walker (born June 23, 1967) is an American former professional football player. He played college football for the University of Michigan as a tight end and inside linebacker from 1986 to 1989. He played professional football as a tight end in the National Football League (NFL) for nine seasons with the San Diego Chargers (1990-1993), Kansas City Chiefs (1994-1997), and Oakland Raiders (1998).

== Early life ==
Walker was born in Glenwood, Illinois, in 1967. He attended Bloom High School in Chicago Heights, Illinois.

== University of Michigan ==
Walker enrolled at the University of Michigan in 1985 and played college football for head coach Bo Schembechler's Michigan Wolverines football teams from 1986 to 1989. After redshirting in 1985, he played at the inside linebacker position in 1986. He was converted to a tight end in 1987 and won Michigan's Frederick Matthei Award.

As a junior, Walker started two games, one at tight end and one at split end. As a senior, he was a team co-captain and started all 12 games at tight end for the 1989 Michigan Wolverines football team that compiled a 10–2 in Schembechler's last season as Michigan's head coach. At the end of the 1989 season, Walker was selected as the first-team tight end on the 1989 All-Big Ten Conference football team. He caught 33 passes for 446 yards and five touchdowns during his time at Michigan.

== Professional football ==
Walker was selected by the San Diego Chargers in the sixth round (163rd overall pick) of the 1990 NFL draft. Walker became the Chargers' starting tight end from 1990 to 1993. He appeared in 60 games, 55 as a starter, and caught 98 passes for 979 yards and four touchdowns.

Walker joined the Kansas City Chiefs for the 1994 NFL season. In four seasons with the Chiefs from 1994 to 1997, Walker appeared in 58 games, 28 as a starter, and caught 75 passes for 720 yards and four touchdowns. He concluded his playing career with the Oakland Raiders during the 1999 NFL season. He appeared 11 games, three as a starter, for the Raiders and caught seven passes for 71 yards.

In nine NFL seasons, Walker appeared in 129 regular season games and caught 180 passes for 1,770 yard and nine touchdowns. He also appeared in five playoff games and caught 10 passes for 127 yards and a touchdown in those postseason contests.

== NFL career statistics ==
Legend
**Bold**	Career high

=== Regular season ===
Year	Team	Games		Receiving				
Year	Team	GP	GS	Rec	Yds	Avg	Lng	TD
1990	SDG	**16**	12	23	240	10.4	23	1
1991	SDG	**16**	**16**	20	134	6.7	14	0
1992	SDG	**16**	**16**	34	**393**	11.6	**59**	**2**
1993	SDG	12	11	21	212	10.1	25	1
1994	KAN	15	11	**36**	382	10.6	57	**2**
1995	KAN	**16**	3	25	205	8.2	18	1
1996	KAN	11	9	9	73	8.1	24	1
1997	KAN	**16**	5	5	60	**12.0**	22	0
1999	OAK	11	3	7	71	10.1	21	1
		129	86	180	1,770	9.8	59	9

=== Playoffs ===
Year	Team	Games		Receiving				
Year	Team	GP	GS	Rec	Yds	Avg	Lng	TD
1992	SDG	**2**	**2**	**6**	**93**	**15.5**	**33**	0
1994	KAN	1	1	3	27	9.0	15	**1**
1995	KAN	1	0	1	7	7.0	7	0
1997	KAN	1	0	0	0	0.0	0	0
		5	3	10	127	12.7	33	1

== Later life ==
After retiring from football, Walker lived in West Bloomfield, Michigan. In 2007, he was hired as a sports broadcaster for the Big Ten Network. He was married to Rhonda Walker, a news anchor on Detroit's WDIV-TV, but the two later divorced.

In July 2012, Walker sued the NFL alleging that the league failed to warn him about the risk of football-related concussions.
