= Greg McMurtry =

American football player (born 1967)

No. 86, 88
- Position: Wide receiver

Personal information
- Born: October 15, 1967 (age 59); Jackson, Mississippi, U.S.
- Listed height: 6 ft 2 in (1.88 m)
- Listed weight: 207 lb (94 kg)

Career information
- High school: Brockton (MA)
- College: Michigan
- NFL draft: 1990: 3rd round, 80th overall pick

Career history
- New England Patriots (1990–1993); Los Angeles Rams (1994)*; Chicago Bears (1994); Washington Redskins (1996)*
- * Offseason or practice squad member only

Awards and highlights
- First-team All-Big Ten (1989); Second-team All-Big Ten (1988)

Career NFL statistics
- Receptions: 128
- Receiving yards: 1,631
- Receiving touchdowns: 5
- Stats at Pro Football Reference

Gregory Wendell McMurtry (born October 15, 1967) is an American former professional football player who was a wide receiver in the National Football League (NFL). He played college football for the University of Michigan from 1986 to 1989. He caught 111 passes for 2,163 yards and 15 touchdowns for Michigan. He played in the NFL for the New England Patriots from 1990 to 1993 and for the Chicago Bears in 1994. He caught 128 passes for 1,631 yards in 67 NFL games.

== Early life ==
McMurtry was born in Jackson, Mississippi, in 1967. He attended Brockton High School in Brockton, Massachusetts. McMurtry was an outstanding baseball and football player at Brockton High School. He was selected by the Boston Red Sox in the first round (14th overall pick) of the 1986 Major League Baseball draft, but turned down a six-figure signing bonus to attend the University of Michigan on a football scholarship.

== University of Michigan ==
McMurtry enrolled at the University of Michigan in 1986 and played college football for head coach Bo Schembechler's Michigan Wolverines football teams from 1986 to 1989. He started five games at flanker in 1986 (22 catches for 508 yards), 12 games at split end in 1987 (21 catches for 474 yards and five touchdowns), 10 games at split end in 1988 (27 catches for 470 yards and three touchdowns), and 12 games at split end in 1989 (41 catches for 711 yards and seven touchdowns). He played on three Big Ten Conference championship teams and appeared in three Rose Bowl Games. He had his best game on November 18, 1989, with seven catches for 189 yards and three touchdowns against Minnesota. In four years at Michigan, he caught 111 passes for 2,163 yards and 15 touchdowns.

== Professional football ==
McMurtry was selected by the Patriots in the third round (80th overall pick) of the 1990 NFL draft. As a rookie during the 1990 NFL season, McMurtry appeared in 13 games, five as a starter, and caught 22 passes for 240 yards. The following year, he enjoyed his best season in the NFL, catching 41 passes for 614 yards and two touchdowns. In Week 4 of the 1991 NFL season, he caught a game-winning touchdown pass from New England quarterback Hugh Millen in the final minute against the Houston Oilers. In June 1992, the Patriots re-signed McMurtry. During the 1992 NFL season, McMurtry appeared in all 16 games for the Patriots, 15 as a starter, and caught 35 passes for 424 yards and one touchdown. In 1993, McMurtry's final season with the Patriots, he appeared in 14 games, eight as a starter, and caught 22 passes for 241 yards and a touchdown.

McMurtry signed with the Los Angeles Rams in 1994 but was released prior to the start of the regular season. He was signed by the Chicago Bears in August 1994. McMurtry appeared in nine games for the Bears, four as a starter, during the 1994 NFL season. He caught eight passes for 112 yards and one touchdown.

During his five-year NFL career, McMurtry had 128 receptions for 1,631 yards and five touchdowns.

== NFL career statistics ==
Legend
**Bold**	Career high

Year	Team	Games		Receiving				
Year	Team	GP	GS	Rec	Yds	Avg	Lng	TD
1990	NWE	13	5	22	240	10.9	26	0
1991	NWE	15	12	**41**	**614**	**15.0**	40	**2**
1992	NWE	**16**	**15**	35	424	12.1	**65**	1
1993	NWE	14	8	22	241	11.0	20	1
1994	CHI	9	4	8	112	14.0	30	1
		67	44	128	1,631	12.7	65	5

== See also ==
- Lists of Michigan Wolverines football receiving leaders
