= Doug Skene =

American football player (born 1970)

No. 74
- Position: Guard

Personal information
- Born: June 17, 1970 (age 56); Ann Arbor, Michigan, U.S.
- Listed height: 6 ft 6 in (1.98 m)
- Listed weight: 295 lb (134 kg)

Career information
- High school: Allen (Allen, Texas)
- College: Michigan
- NFL draft: 1993: 8th round, 217th overall pick

Career history
- Philadelphia Eagles (1993)*; New Orleans Saints (1993)*; New England Patriots (1993–1994)
- * Offseason or practice squad member only

Awards and highlights
- Second-team All-Big Ten (1992)

Career NFL statistics
- Games played: 6
- Games started: 6
- Stats at Pro Football Reference

Douglas C. Skene (born June 17, 1970) is an American former professional football player. He played college football as an offensive guard and offensive tackle for the University of Michigan from 1989 to 1992. He played professional football in the National Football League (NFL) for the New England Patriots from 1993 to 1994.

== Early life ==
Skene was born in Ann Arbor, Michigan, in 1970, but moved to Texas with his family in 1980. He attended Allen High School in Texas.

== College career ==
Skene played college football for the University of Michigan from 1989 to 1992. He played on the offensive line for Michigan and was coached there by Les Miles. Skene later recalled: "The thing that Les hammered us on was the attention to detail. I never went through more walk-throughs in my entire life and more meetings and detailed study of the opponents than with Les. I felt he was really hard on me, and I told him later that at times I hated him. But looking back on it, he was the best coach of Xs and Os and the best technician I ever had."

== Professional career ==
Pre-draft measurables
Height	Weight	Arm length	Hand span	40-yard dash	10-yard split	20-yard split	20-yard shuttle	Vertical jump	Broad jump	Bench press
6 ft 5 in (1.96 m)	306 lb (139 kg)	33 1/4 in (0.84 m)	9 1/2 in (0.24 m)	5.55 s	1.90 s	3.18 s	4.95 s	21.5 in (0.55 m)	7 ft 8 in (2.34 m)	23 reps
All values from NFL Combine

Skene was drafted by the Philadelphia Eagles in the eighth round (217th overall pick) of the 1993 NFL draft. He ended up with the New Orleans Saints and was put on waivers. In November 1993, he was signed by the New England Patriots. He started the first six games of the 1994 NFL season for the Patriots. In his first NFL game, Skene was credited with playing a key role in helping Drew Bledsoe pass for 421 yards to set a franchise record. In an October 1994 game against the Los Angeles Raiders, Skene suffered a career-ending injury to his left knee. He was making a block when 310-pound Chester McGlockton fell on the back of his knee. Skene attempted a comeback in 1995, but he was waived by the Patriots in late August 1995.
