= Jon Vaughn =

American football player (born 1970)

No. 24, 22, 21, 26
- Positions: Running back, return specialist

Personal information
- Born: March 12, 1970 (age 56); Florissant, Missouri, U.S.
- Listed height: 5 ft 9 in (1.75 m)
- Listed weight: 203 lb (92 kg)

Career information
- High school: McCluer North (Florissant)
- College: Michigan
- NFL draft: 1991: 5th round, 112th overall pick

Career history
- New England Patriots (1991–1992); Seattle Seahawks (1993–1994); Kansas City Chiefs (1994); Pittsburgh Steelers (1996)*; Rhein Fire (1998)
- * Offseason or practice squad member only

Awards and highlights
- World Bowl champion (1998); Big Ten Co-Offensive Player of the Year (1990); First-team All-Big Ten (1990)

Career NFL statistics
- Rushing yards: 846
- Rushing average: 4.1
- Rushing touchdowns: 4
- Receptions: 23
- Receiving yards: 178
- Receiving touchdowns: 1
- Return yards: 2,390
- Return touchdowns: 4
- Stats at Pro Football Reference

Jonathan Stewart Vaughn (born March 12, 1970) is an American former professional football player who was a running back and return specialist in the National Football League (NFL) for four seasons from 1991 to 1994 with the Seattle Seahawks, New England Patriots and Kansas City Chiefs. In the 1992 season, his most productive, he led the Patriots in rushing and led the NFL in kickoff returns with 20 that averaged 28.2 yards apiece. Vaughn was the tenth NFL player to score four touchdowns on kickoff-returns and the second to score a kickoff-return touchdowns for three teams.

He played college football for the Michigan Wolverines, where set University of Michigan records for 200-yard games and yards per carry. In 1990, he was named the Big Ten Co-Offensive Player of the Year in.

As a high school sprinter, he set Missouri State High School Activities Association (MSHSAA) 100-meter and 200-meter records that stood for more than a decade.

== Early life ==
Born and raised in Florissant, Missouri, Vaughn attended McCluer North High School there. In 1988, he set the Missouri high-school record in the 200-meter dash: 21.28 seconds, a mark that stood until 2002. His 100-meter time of 10.44 seconds, set at the 1998 state championship meet, stood as the state record until 2007.

== College ==
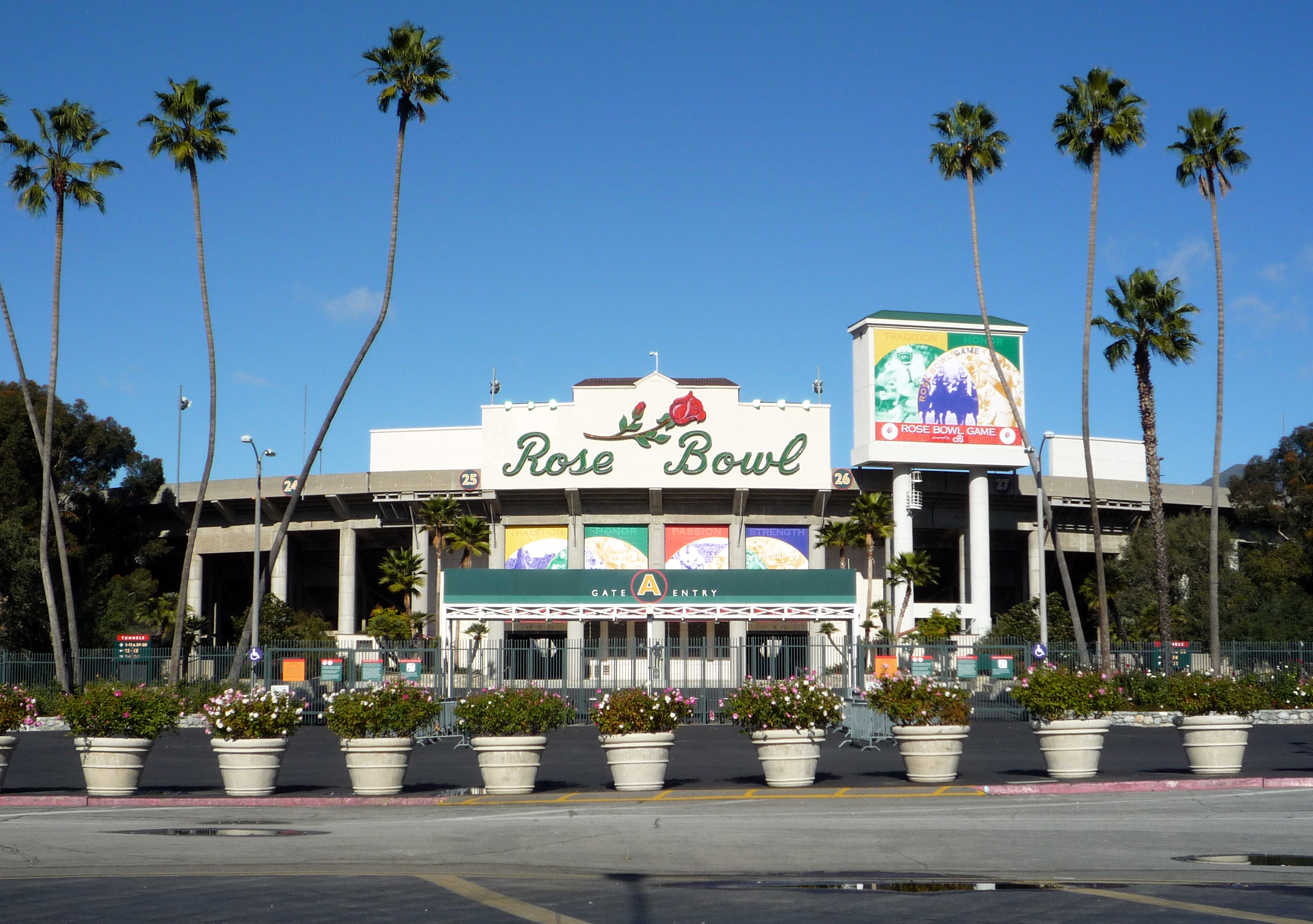
Vaughn's 1989 Big Ten Champions appeared in the Rose Bowl.

During his two seasons with the Wolverines at the University of Michigan, he played for back-to-back Big Ten Conference champions. He accumulated rushing statistics in only 16 NCAA games. However, in his redshirt sophomore 1990 season, he was selected Co-Big Ten Offensive Football Player of the year (along with University of Iowa Hawkeyes players Nick Bell and Matt Rodgers) by the conference's coaches when he started 11 of 12 games. Vaughn, who wore #25 for the Michigan Wolverines football program in 1989 and 1990, played running back after redshirting as a defensive back who wore #46 in 1988.

As of 2007, Vaughn holds the University of Michigan career yards per attempt record (minimum 200 attempts).

He opened the 1990 season by posting 201 rushing yards on September 15, 1990, against University of Notre Dame Fighting Irish, then 288 rushing yards against the University of California, Los Angeles Bruins on September 22, 1990, at the Big House. This feat made him the first Michigan back to rush for 200 yards in consecutive games, a feat not duplicated until Mike Hart did so in 2004. The 288-yard effort ranks third on the All-time Michigan single-game rushing yards list (behind Ron Johnson's 347 yards in 1968 against the Wisconsin Badgers and Tshimanga Biakabutuka's 313 yards against the Ohio State Buckeyes in 1995). His 1,364 yards rushing that season ranks 13th on the Michigan all-time single season rushing list. During that redshirt sophomore season, he played with freshman Ricky Powers, who set the Michigan freshman rushing record later broken by Hart and who tied with Vaughn for a team-high five 100-yard rushing games, although accumulating far fewer total yards than Vaughn.

During the 1990 season, Vaughn was closely watched in the press. He entered Michigan's seventh game—the weekend of October 28, 1990—as the nation's leading rusher. Entering the eighth week, he was averaging over 144 yards per game and was second in the nation and first in the Big Ten. He only gained a total of 94 yards in his ninth, tenth and eleventh games combined and entered Michigan's bowl game as #11 in the nation. He ran for 128 yards in his final game and ended the season as the Big Ten Offensive Player of the Year. He also ended the season eleventh in the nation in rushing and second in the Big Ten with 112.4 yards per game.

Despite his eventual professional success as a kickoff returner, he never returned kickoffs in college. In 1990, Desmond Howard and Derrick Alexander shared the kick-return duties. In 1989, Desmond Howard and Tony Boles shared the role.

In 2020, Vaughn would join at least 70 other plaintiffs in lawsuits against the University of Michigan charging the school with allowing team doctor Robert Anderson to sexually abuse students for decades.

== Professional football ==
Vaughn entered the 1991 NFL draft after his redshirt sophomore season. The season trailed off as Powers got much of the late-season workload with four consecutive 100-yard efforts in Michigan wins. Vaughn was one of a relatively small class of underclassmen, headlined by Ragib "Rocket" Ismail, to be approved in the NFL's second class of players allowed to declare themselves eligible for the draft despite remaining amateur eligibility. In addition to Vaughn, other headliners among the underclassmen were Herman Moore, Todd Marinovich, and Rob Carpenter (who also played for the 1991 Patriots). Vaughn was selected with the first pick of the fifth round of the 1991 NFL Draft by the New England Patriots. Coach Dick MacPherson used him sparingly from scrimmage in his rookie year as Leonard Russell was the featured back for the 1991 Patriots. However, he had 34 kickoff returns, including one touchdown, for an average of 21.1 yards in 1991, 10th among those with 1.2 returns per game. He also completed a 13-yard touchdown pass to Marv Cook against the Houston Oilers on September 22, 1991, the Patriots' only non-quarterback touchdown pass until Dave Meggett repeated the feat during the 1997 NFL season.

In 1992, Vaughn led the team in rushing yards with 451 yards on 113 carries. He had 20 kickoff returns for an average of 28.2 yards, including another return touchdown. This second kickoff return touchdown was the last by a Patriot until Derrick Cullors repeated the feat in 1997 against the Buffalo Bills. Vaughn's first 100-yard rushing game—110 yards on 20 carries—came on November 22 in a 24–3 win against the New York Jets at home. In 1992, Vaughn had six fumbles on only 113 carries and 13 receptions, and five of the fumbles were lost to the other team. His 28.2-yard average led the National Football League (Deion Sanders was second at 26.7).

After two seasons in New England, Vaughn was traded to the Seattle Seahawks for an undisclosed draft pick. During the 1993 NFL season, his workload was modest in the backfield with Chris Warren and John L. Williams, but one game featured a career-best 131 yards on 26 carries, his second and last 100-yard rushing game.

Vaughn spent most of the 1994 NFL season with the Seahawks, but he was released after having three fumbles on only 27 carries. In December, he was signed by the Kansas City Chiefs. He had no rushes from scrimmage that year, but he returned kickoffs for both teams and recorded a kick return touchdown for each, including a 91-yard runback against the Miami Dolphins for the Chiefs in 1994.

In his career, Vaughn ran back four kickoffs for touchdowns. This ranked him tenth (two short of the record six) in NFL history through the 2006 NFL season. He had been in a three-way tie for eight upon his retirement before the 1995 NFL season. His kickoff return touchdowns for three teams tied Ron Smith for the NFL record, which was broken during the 2007 NFL season by Allen Rossum who posted a touchdown return for his fourth team. Despite his success as a kick returner, he was released during training camp in 1995.

== Career statistics ==
**Year**	**Team**	**Games**	**Rushes**	**Yards**	**Avg.**	**TDs**	**Receptions**	**Yards**	**Avg.**	**TDs**	**Kickoffs**	**Yards**	**Avg.**	**TDs**
1989	Michigan	4	10	57	5.7	0	0	0	0	0	0	0	0	0
1990	Michigan	12	216	1364	6.3	9	20	123	6.2	0	0	0	0	0
	Total	16	226	1421	6.3	9	20	123	6.2	0	0	0	0	0
**Year**	**Team**	**Games**	**Rushes**	**Yards**	**Avg.**	**TDs**	**Receptions**	**Yards**	**Avg.**	**TDs**	**Kickoffs**	**Yards**	**Avg.**	**TDs**
1991	New England	16	31	146	4.7	2	9	89	9.9	0	34	717	21.1	1
1992	New England	16	113	451	4	1	13	84	6.5	0	20	564	28.2	1
1993	Seattle	16	36	153	4.3	0	0	0	0	0	16	280	17.5	0
1994	Seattle	10	27	96	3.6	1	1	5	5	1	18	443	24.6	1
1994	Kansas City	3	0	0	0	0	0	0	0	0	15	386	25.7	1
	Totals	61	207	846	4.1	4	23	178	7.7	0	103	2,390	23.2	4

100-Yard Games

**Week**	**Day**	**Date**	**Result**	**Team**	**Opponent**	**Score**	**Rushes**	**Yards**	**TDs**	**Avg.**
12	Sun	November 22, 1992	W	**NWE**	NYJ	24–3	20	110	1	5.5
17	Sun	December 26, 1993	W	**SEA**	PIT	16–6	26	131	0	5

N.B.: Home team is in bold.

== Activism ==
Vaughn revealed in July 2020 that he had been sexually abused by the late University of Michigan doctor Robert Anderson (1928–2008) after allegations began emerging about the physician in February 2020. Vaughn said he saw Anderson while playing for University of Michigan from 1988 to 1990, and during several visits the doctor gave him testicular and rectal exams. Vaughn became active in efforts to hold the university accountable including speaking about bills aimed at removing barriers allowing victims of Anderson to sue the university. Among his most high-profile activities was camping outside of the home of then-University of Michigan President Mark Schlissel in October 2021. In 2022, Vaughn announced a bid to run to become a University of Michigan regent.

== See also ==
- Lists of Michigan Wolverines football rushing leaders
