= Burnie Legette =

American football player (born 1970)

No. 35
- Positions: Running back, fullback

Personal information
- Born: December 5, 1970 (age 55); Colorado Springs, Colorado, U.S.
- Listed height: 6 ft 1 in (1.85 m)
- Listed weight: 243 lb (110 kg)

Career information
- College: Michigan
- NFL draft: 1993: undrafted

Career history
- New England Patriots (1993–1994); Arizona Cardinals (1995)*
- * Offseason or practice squad member only
- Stats at Pro Football Reference

Burnie Alex Legette (born December 5, 1970) is an American former professional football running back. He played college football as a running back for the University of Michigan from 1989 to 1992. He also played in the National Football League (NFL) for the New England Patriots during the 1993 and 1994 NFL seasons.

== Early life ==
Legette was born in Colorado Springs, Colorado, and attended Billy Mitchell High School in Colorado Springs. He was a star tailback for the Mitchell football team, rushing for over 300 yards in one game during his senior year. He was selected as a Parade magazine All-American in his senior year. He was also a sprinter for Mitchell's track team.

Legette was recruited out of high school by UCLA, Stanford, Notre Dame and Michigan. In January 1989, he announced his commitment to play for the University of Michigan.

== University of Michigan ==
Legette played college football as a fullback for the University of Michigan from 1989 to 1992. In four years with the Wolverines, Legette gained 592 rushing yards and scored four rushing touchdowns on 43 carries for an average of 3.6 yards per carry. His longest run for Michigan was a 50-yard gain against Iowa on October 5, 1991. Legette also had 145 receiving yards and 121 kickoff return yards for the Wolverines.

== Professional football ==
Legette was not drafted in the 1993 NFL draft, but he signed a free agent contract with the New England Patriots and played for the Patriots in the 1993 and 1994 NFL seasons. He appeared in ten games for the Patriots. He suffered a hamstring pull in July 1995, and was cut by the Patriots in late August 1995, shortly before the start of the 1995 NFL season.
