= 1989 Rose Bowl =

American college football game

- 75th Rose Bowl Game
Michigan Wolverines	USC Trojans
(8–2–1)	(10–1)
22	14
Head coach: Bo Schembechler	Head coach: Larry Smith
AP / Coaches; 11 / 11	AP / Coaches; 5 / 5
	1	2	3	4	Total
Michigan	3	0	6	13	22
USC	0	14	0	0	14
- Date: January 2, 1989
- Season: 1988
- Stadium: Rose Bowl
- Location: Pasadena, California
- MVP: Leroy Hoard (Michigan FB)
- Favorite: USC by 6½ points
- National anthem: Michigan Marching Band
- Referee: Gordon Riese (Pac-10) (split crew between Pac-10 and Big Ten)
- Halftime show: Michigan Marching Band, Spirit of Troy
- Attendance: 101,688

United States TV coverage
- Network: ABC
- Announcers: Keith Jackson, Bob Griese

The 1989 Rose Bowl was the 75th edition of the college football bowl game, played at the Rose Bowl in Pasadena, California, on Monday, January 2. This year marked the 100th anniversary of the Tournament of Roses parade. The Michigan Wolverines of the Big Ten Conference upset the fifth-ranked USC Trojans of the Pacific-10 Conference, 22–14. Down by 11 points at halftime, the Wolverines shut out the Trojans in the second half and won by eight. Michigan fullback Leroy Hoard was named the Player of the Game.

It marked consecutive Rose Bowl wins for the Big Ten, which had only two victories (1974, 1981) in the previous eighteen (1970–1987). Michigan head coach Bo Schembechler's record in the game improved to 2–7 (.222). Under second-year head coach Larry Smith, USC lost consecutive Rose Bowls for the only time in its history; with the Pac-12 Conference’s demise in 2024, it marked the last time that would happen. The previous western team to lose consecutively was California, which lost three straight (1949–1951) while representing the Pacific Coast Conference (PCC).

This was the first of 22 Rose Bowls televised by ABC; it had been on NBC since the first television broadcast in January 1952. Because New Year's Day was on a Sunday in 1989, the game was played the next day. Both teams returned the following year for a rematch, with a different result.

== Teams ==
=== Michigan Wolverines ===
Michigan opened the season with consecutive narrow losses to Notre Dame and Miami (FL) who were ranked #13 and #1 respectively at the time. But they recovered to go unbeaten the rest of the way, their only blemish being a 17–17 tie at Iowa. A 17–3 win over defending Big 10 champ Michigan State proved to be the difference as Michigan won the Big 10 by one game over Michigan State.

=== USC Trojans ===
USC opened the season with nine straight wins and rose to #2 in the rankings. They faced sixth ranked rival UCLA, who was 9–1 and had been ranked #1 for a couple of weeks earlier. The game in Pasadena was one of the notable ones in the UCLA–USC rivalry in that it was for the Pac-10 championship (Rose Bowl berth), and a possible Heisman Trophy for either starting quarterback, Troy Aikman of UCLA or Rodney Peete of USC. Peete was found to have measles in the days before the game; USC used a strong ground game and "bend but don't break" defense, in front of the largest Rose Bowl regular season crowd in history, to beat the Bruins 31–22.

The win set up a rare #2 USC vs. #1 Notre Dame matchup the following week in Los Angeles, which the undefeated Irish dominated, 27–10. It was the fifth straight loss for the Trojans in the annual rivalry, a winless streak that continued until 1996.

== Game summary ==
Behind the passing of Heisman Trophy runner-up Rodney Peete and running of Aaron Emmanuel, USC scored two touchdowns in the second quarter and took a 14–3 to halftime. Despite their lack of early success, Michigan stuck with its pounding running attack led by a huge offensive line and running back (and game MVP) Leroy Hoard. They began to wear down the Trojans and USC's offense began to sputter. By the fourth quarter, Michigan's offensive line took over and the Wolverines took a 22–14 lead into the last two minutes. Peete tried to lead the Trojans to a touchdown and game tying two-point conversion but Michigan's defense forced an interception to effectively end the game.
