= 1990 Rose Bowl =

American college football game

- 76th Rose Bowl Game
USC Trojans	Michigan Wolverines
(8–2–1)	(10–1)
17	10
Head coach: Larry Smith	Head coach: Bo Schembechler
AP / Coaches; 12 / 12	AP / Coaches; 3 / 3
	1	2	3	4	Total
USC	0	10	0	7	17
Michigan	0	3	7	0	10
- Date: January 1, 1990
- Season: 1989
- Stadium: Rose Bowl
- Location: Pasadena, California
- MVP: Ricky Ervins (USC RB)
- Favorite: USC by 2 points
- Referee: Jim Kemerling (Big Ten; split crew between Big Ten and Pac-10)
- Attendance: 103,450

United States TV coverage
- Network: ABC
- Announcers: Keith Jackson, Bob Griese

The 1990 Rose Bowl was the 76th edition of the college football bowl game, played at the Rose Bowl in Pasadena, California, on Monday, January 1. The game was a rematch of the previous year, won by Michigan, 22–14. Gaining a measure of revenge, the USC Trojans upset the third-ranked Michigan Wolverines, 17–10. USC junior running back Ricky Ervins was named the Player Of The Game. This was Bo Schembechler's final game as Michigan's head coach, and he finished with a 2–8 record in Rose Bowls.

== Pre-game activities ==
On Tuesday, October 24, 1989, Tournament of Roses President Don W. Fedde chose 17-year-old Yasmine Begum Delawari, a senior at La Canada High School and a resident of La Cañada Flintridge, California. She became the 72nd Rose Queen to reign over the 101st Rose Parade and the 76th Rose Bowl Game on New Year's Day.

The game was presided over by the 1990 Tournament of Roses Royal Court and Rose Parade grand marshal John Glenn, U.S. senator from Ohio and an original astronaut. Members of the court included princesses Kristin Gibbs, South Pasadena, Pasadena City College; Inger Miller, Altadena, John Muir High School; Marisa Stephenson, Arcadia, Arcadia High School; Joanne Ward, Arcadia, Arcadia High School; Kandace Watson, Pasadena, John Muir High School; and Peggy Ann Zazueta, Temple City, Maranatha High School.

== Teams ==
=== Michigan Wolverines ===
The Wolverines lost their opening game, at home, to Notre Dame 24–19. The UCLA Bruins under Terry Donahue and the Michigan Wolverines under Bo Schembechler met for the only time since the 1983 Rose Bowl in a UCLA home game at the Rose Bowl on September 23, 1989. The fifth-ranked Michigan Wolverines defeated #24 UCLA by a point, 24–23. This began a ten-game winning streak for Michigan, the biggest win being a 24–10 win at Illinois that ultimately gave the Big Ten title to Michigan over the runner-up Illini.

=== USC Trojans ===
USC lost their opener to Illinois 14–13, but won the rest with the exception of a 28–24 mid-season loss at Notre Dame and a 10–10 tie in their regular season finale with rival UCLA. They won the Pac-10 title by 2½ games over Washington, who had struggled early in the season.

It was a third-straight berth in the Rose Bowl for the Trojans, but they had lost the previous two, the only such streak in USC history (through 2025, no Pac-12 team has done so since). The previous western team to lose consecutively was California, which dropped three straight (1949–1951) while representing the Pacific Coast Conference (PCC).

== Game summary ==
The game was expected to be a tight physical defensive struggle, and it was. USC scored first, when quarterback Todd Marinovich ran for a touchdown and led 10–3 at halftime, but Michigan came back to tie the score in the third quarter. Midway through the fourth quarter, Michigan faced a 4th-and-2 at its own 46-yard line. The normally conservative Schembechler called for a fake punt and it worked to perfection as punter Chris Stapleton rambled 24 yards for what would have been a first down, but Michigan was called for holding, in addition to an unsportsmanlike conduct penalty because of a Schembechler temper tantrum. On the resultant drive, USC scored the winning touchdown with just over a minute to play.

At the end of the game, Schembechler walked off the field as head coach for the last time, refusing interview requests; he remained briefly as the athletic director, a post he gained concurrently in 1988. A few days later, he announced he was leaving Michigan to become the president of the Detroit Tigers of Major League Baseball.

=== Scoring ===
==== First quarter ====
None 0–0 tie

==== Second quarter ====
USC: Todd Marinovich, 1-yard run (Quin Rodriguez kick), USC 7–0
Mich: J.D. Carlson, 19-yard field goal, USC 7–3
USC: Rodriguez, 34-yard field goal, USC 10–3

==== Third quarter ====
Mich: Allen Jefferson, 2-yard run (Carlson kick), 10–10 tie

==== Fourth quarter ====
USC: Ricky Ervins, 14-yard run (Rodriguez kick), 17–10 USC
