= Dean Dingman =

American football player and coach (born 1968)

No. 67
- Position: Guard

Personal information
- Born: September 27, 1968 (age 58); East Troy, Wisconsin, U.S.
- Listed height: 6 ft 2 in (1.88 m)
- Listed weight: 286 lb (130 kg)

Career information
- High school: East Troy
- College: Michigan
- NFL draft: 1991: 8th round, 212th overall pick

Career history
- Pittsburgh Steelers (1991)

Awards and highlights
- First-team All-American (1990); Third-team All-American (1989); 2× First-team All-Big Ten (1989-1990)

Dean Dingman (born September 27, 1968) is an American former professional football player who was a guard for the Pittsburgh Steelers of the National Football League (NFL). He played college football for the Michigan Wolverines, earning All-American honors in 1990. He was selected by the Steelers in the eighth round of the 1991 NFL draft.

A native of East Troy, Wisconsin, Dingman was named to the USA Today's All USA Football Team as a high school offensive lineman in 1986.

== College career ==
Dingman contributed immediately as only the third true freshman to start any games on the Michigan offensive line. Dingman was a two-time All Big Ten selection, and he started 37 games at Michigan. In the January 1991 Gator Bowl, Dingman and the entire offensive line, which included Greg Skrepenak, were named Most Valuable Player. Dingman helped the Michigan offense gain a record 715 yards of total offense in a 35-3 victory over Mississippi in the Gator Bowl.

This marked the culmination of a productive season in which the offensive line helped Jon Vaughn set the Michigan football record for career yards per carry (minimum 200 attempts). Behind true senior Dingman and redshirt junior Skrepenak, redshirt sophomore Vaughn concluded his Michigan career that season with 1473 yards on 226 rushes for a career 6.3 yards per attempt average, including 1416 yards on 216 rushes during the 1990 season. In 1990, Dingman was selected as a first-team All American by the Sporting News and the American Football Coaches Association.

He was a member of the three-peat Big Ten Conference champions from 1988 to 1990 who appeared in two Rose Bowls and a Gator Bowl.

== Professional career ==
Dingman was selected by the Pittsburgh Steelers in the eighth round of the 1991 NFL draft with the 212th selection overall. Dingman wore #78 all four years at Michigan. The Steelers placed Dingman on injured reserve status in August 1991.

== Post-playing career ==
As of 2001, Dingman was a high school football coach in Aliso Viejo, California.
