= Jarrod Bunch =

American football player and actor (born 1968)

No. 33, 45
- Position: Fullback

Personal information
- Born: August 9, 1968 (age 58); Ashtabula, Ohio, U.S.
- Listed height: 6 ft 2 in (1.88 m)
- Listed weight: 250 lb (113 kg)

Career information
- High school: Ashtabula
- College: Michigan
- NFL draft: 1991: 1st round, 27th overall pick

Career history

Playing
- New York Giants (1991–1993); Los Angeles Raiders (1994)

Coaching
- Beverly Hills High School (2018–2020)

Career NFL statistics
- Rushing yards: 629
- Rushing average: 4.6
- Total Touchdowns: 7
- Stats at Pro Football Reference

Jarrod Glenn Bunch (born August 9, 1968) is an American former professional football player who was a fullback in the National Football League (NFL). He played college football for the Michigan Wolverines from 1986 to 1990. He was the first-round pick for the New York Giants (27th overall) in the 1991 NFL draft. Bunch was named New York Giants Offensive Player of the Year in 1992. In the 1993 training camp, Bunch sustained a knee injury that tore ligaments in his knee that sidelined him for seven weeks; upon his return, his ability to play was greatly affected. After multiple surgeries in the offseason, his contract with the Giants was terminated after he failed a physical examination before the start of 1994 season. He signed with Los Angeles Raiders two weeks later. Bunch retired from football in 1995. He became the head coach of the Beverly Hills High School football team. He is the president of the NFLPA former players Los Angeles Chapter. He and his wife Robin Emtage live in Beverly Hills, California.

== Early life ==
Bunch was born in Ashtabula, Ohio, in 1968. At age five, he lost the fourth toe on his right foot in an accident involving a lawnmower. Bunch attended Ashtabula High School, where he was a star football player and set high school records in pole vault and discus. He became the first student from the school to be awarded a scholarship to attend a Division I college for football, as well as the first and only to be drafted in the first round of the National Football League.

== University of Michigan ==
Bunch enrolled at the University of Michigan in 1986 and played college football as a fullback for the Michigan Wolverines football teams from 1987 to 1990. He came to Michigan intent on playing tailback, but with Jamie Morris securing that spot, Bunch was converted to the fullback position. Bunch started nine games at fullback in 1987, five games in 1988, five games in 1989, and 10 games in 1990. He also served as captain of the 1990 team that compiled 9–3 record, defeated Ole Miss in the 1991 Gator Bowl and finished the season ranked #7 in the final AP Poll. In four years at Michigan, Bunch gained 1,346 rushing yards on 311 carries with eight rushing touchdowns. He also caught 30 passes for 215 yards and four touchdowns.

Bunch graduated with a bachelor's degree in Sports Management and Communications and used the fifth year of his football scholarship to attend graduate school.

== Professional football ==
Pre-draft measurables
Height	Weight	Arm length	Hand span	40-yard dash	10-yard split	20-yard split	20-yard shuttle	Vertical jump	Broad jump	Bench press
6 ft 2 in (1.88 m)	248 lb (112 kg)	31 1/2 in (0.80 m)	10 5/8 in (0.27 m)	4.63 s	1.59 s	2.67 s	4.36 s	30.5 in (0.77 m)	9 ft 9 in (2.97 m)	29 reps
All values from NFL Combine

Bunch was selected by the New York Giants in the first round (27th overall pick) of the 1991 NFL draft. As a rookie, Bunch appeared in 16 games, mostly on special teams. He became a starter during the 1992 NFL season, starting 13 games at fullback while gaining 501 rushing yards, catching 11 passes for 50 yards, and scoring four touchdowns. His average of 4.8 yards per rushing attempt in 1992 ranked second in the NFL. In 1993, Jarrod sustained a knee injury in the first week of training camp. Bunch was limited to 128 rushing yards (3.9 yards per carry), 98 receiving yards, and three touchdowns.

Bunch underwent surgeries on his knees and feet during the off-season before the 1994 NFL season. Not being able to pass the physical because of his injuries, he was released by the Giants and signed with the Los Angeles Raiders as a replacement for Napoleon McCallum. However, his injuries continued to be a problem and he appeared in only three games for the Raiders. He was released by the Raiders in October 1994, marking the end of his NFL playing career.

== Coaching career ==
In May 2020, Bunch was chosen to be a participant in the National Football leagues, "Bill Walsh Diversity Coaching Fellowship" with the Los Angeles Rams.

On May 18, 2018, Bunch was introduced as the head coach of the Beverly Hills High School football team.

== Later life ==
After his playing career ended, Bunch has been in entertainment as an actor and producer. He has his own production company, Bunch Time Productions. He and his wife, Robin Emtage, moved to Beverly Hills, California in 2002. His acting credits include the role of the young George Foreman in the Emmy award-winning HBO film, Don King: Only in America. He has also appeared as a guest star in many television series, including "The Forgotten," "ER," CSI Miami, Rizzoli & Isles, and Entourage. He appears in Quentin Tarantino's "Django Unchained" and is a principal actor in more than 100 national commercials.

=== Filmography ===
- Reach Me (2014)
- Django Unchained (2012)
- Rizzoli & Isles - "I Kissed a Girl" (2010) TV Episode
- The Forgotten - "Football John" (2010) TV Episode
- Once Fallen (2010)
- Doozers (2010)
- Stileto (2009)
- Good Time Max (2006)
- The Death and Life of Bobby Z (2006)
- Entourage - "What About Bob?" (2006) TV Episode
- Two for the Money (2005)
- ER - Refusal of Care (2005) TV Episode
- JAG - "This Just in from Baghdad" (2004) TV Episode
- The Kings of Brooklyn (2004)
- 100 Centre Street - "Daughters" (2001) - "Let's Make a Night of It" (2001) TV Episodes
- Way Off Broadway (2001)
- Chosen' (2001)
- The Dancer' (2000)
- The Last Supper (2000)
- Third Watch - "Patterns" (1999) TV Episode
- The Best Man (1999)
- After Hours Happy Hour (1999)
- 18 Shades of Dust (1999)
- New York Undercover - "Catharsis" (1998) TV Episode
