= Greg Skrepenak =

American former county commissioner (born 1970)

Luzerne County Board of Commissioners
- In office January 6, 2004 – December 17, 2009
- Succeeded by: Thomas Cooney
- Constituency: Luzerne County, Pennsylvania

Personal details
- Party: Democratic
- Children: 3
- Website: www.luzernecounty.org

Greg Skrepenak
No. 78, 75
- Position: Offensive Tackle

Personal information
- Born: January 31, 1970 (age 56); Wilkes-Barre, Pennsylvania, U.S.
- Listed height: 6 ft 8 in (2.03 m)
- Listed weight: 325 lb (147 kg)

Career information
- High school: G.A.R. Memorial (Wilkes-Barre)
- College: Michigan
- NFL draft: 1992: 2nd round, 32nd overall pick

Career history
- Los Angeles/Oakland Raiders (1992–1995); Carolina Panthers (1996–1997); Oakland Raiders (1999)

Awards and highlights
- Jim Parker Trophy (1991); Unanimous All-American (1991); First-team All-American (1990); Big Ten Offensive Lineman of the Year (1991); 2× First-team All-Big Ten (1990, 1991); Second-team All-Big Ten (1989); Gator Bowl co-MVP (1991)

Career NFL statistics
- Games started: 68
- Games played: 56
- Stats at Pro Football Reference

Gregory Andrew Skrepenak (born January 31, 1970) is an American former county commissioner in Pennsylvania and retired professional football player. He played as an offensive tackle in the National Football League (NFL) for the Los Angeles/Oakland Raiders and the Carolina Panthers. Skrepenak's professional football career spanned the final three years the Raiders played in Los Angeles, California from 1992-1994 and the first year they returned to Oakland, California in 1995. Then, it continued with consecutive seasons (1996 and 1997) with the Carolina Panthers in which he did not miss a start.

Prior to the NFL, Skrepenak had starred as a college football player in the Big Ten Conference for the Michigan Wolverines. He was a two-time All-American, team captain, and four-year starter from 1988-1991. Skrepenak played on four consecutive Big Ten champion teams, appeared in three Rose Bowls and won a Gator Bowl MVP. Previously he had been a scholar athlete at G. A. R. Memorial Junior Senior High School where he earned 12 varsity letters in football, basketball and baseball.

Skrepenak, who was born and raised in Wilkes-Barre in Luzerne County, Pennsylvania, United States, was elected in 2003 to serve as the Luzerne County Commissioner, a position he held from January 2004 until December, 2009. On December 17, 2009, he signed a plea agreement to a charge of corruption and resigned. On August 6, 2010, Skrepenak was sentenced to 24 months in federal prison.

== Early life ==
Skrepenak was born and raised in Wilkes-Barre, Pennsylvania, where he attended G. A. R. Memorial Junior Senior High School. In high school, he was an honor student who excelled in three sports: American football, basketball and baseball. In football, he earned All-scholastic, All-state, and All-American recognition. In basketball, where he scored 1600 points, he was a four-time All-scholastic athlete and two-time conference Most Valuable Player as well as a McDonald's All-American team nominee. In baseball, he was a three-time All-scholastic awardee and an MVP. As a result of his accomplishments he was inducted into the Luzerne County Sports Hall of Fame and the Pennsylvania State Sports Hall of Fame.

== College ==
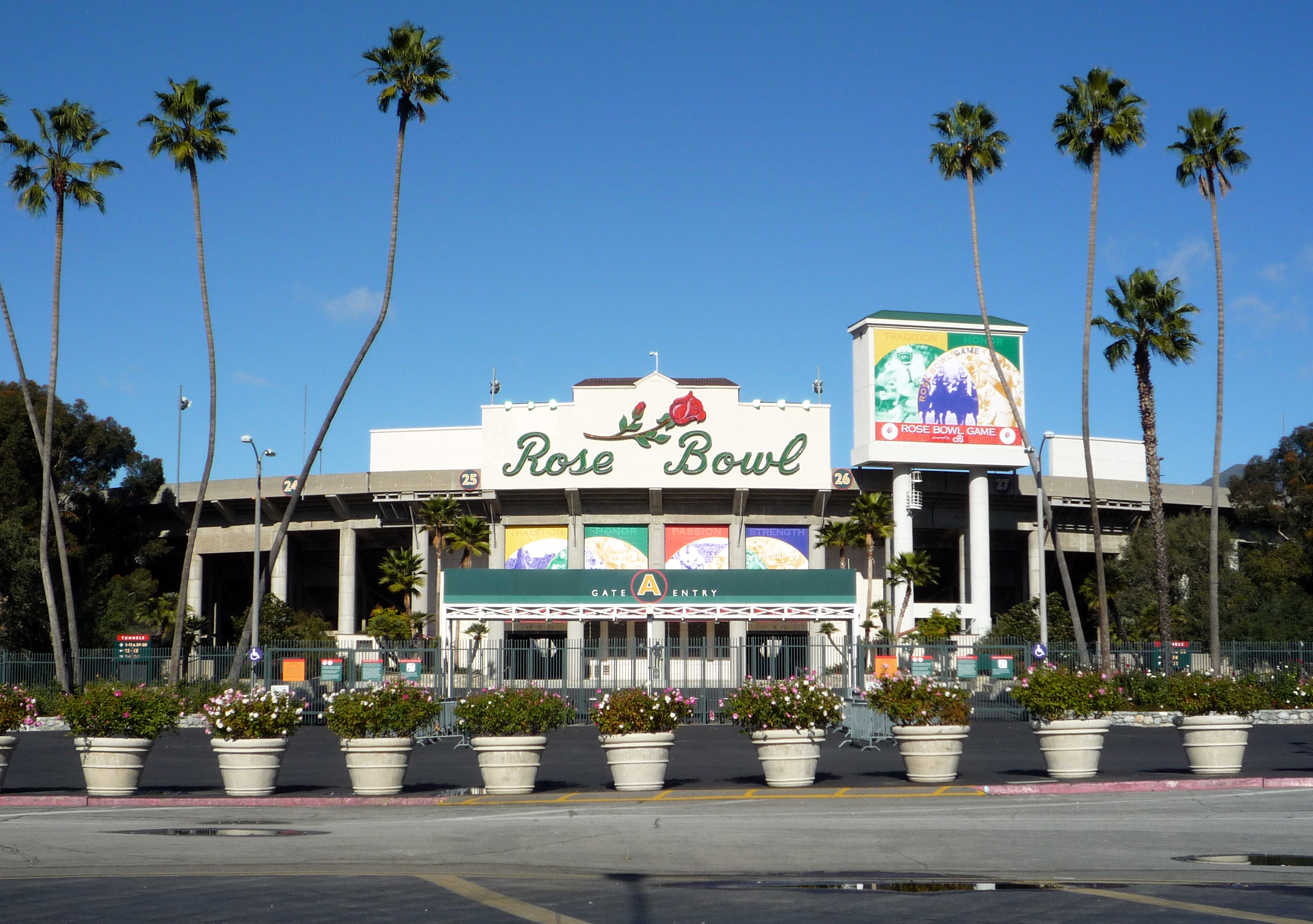
Skrepenak played for four consecutive Big Ten Conference Champions and appeared in three Rose Bowls.

At the University of Michigan, Skrepenak was a two-time All-American, a two-time "All Big Ten" selection and a two-time "Big Ten Lineman of the Year". Skrepenak, who wore #75 for the Wolverines from 1987 to 1991, was also recognized as a "Samaritan All-American" for his community service. Number 75 for the Wolverines is described as the biggest player to have ever played for Michigan at 6 feet 6 inches (1.98 m), 322 pounds (146 kg). As a four-year starter, he set the school offensive line record with 48 starts. In addition, he helped his running backs set new standards in yards/carry for Michigan football. During his time at Michigan, Skrepenak played for four consecutive Big Ten Conference Champions, appeared in three Rose Bowls and won a Gator Bowl MVP. His teams under Bo Schembechler and Gary Moeller compiled a 29–2–1 Big Ten record and each of his teams ended the season ranked in the top 10.

In the January 1991 Gator Bowl, Skrepenak and the entire offensive line, which included Dean Dingman, were named Most Valuable Player. Skrepenak helped the Michigan offense gain a record 715 yards of total offense in a 35–3 victory over Mississippi in the Gator Bowl. This marked the culmination of a productive season in which the offensive line helped Jon Vaughn set the Michigan football record for career yards per carry (minimum 200 attempts). Behind true senior Dingman and redshirt junior Skrepenak, redshirt sophomore Vaughn concluded his Michigan career that season with 1,473 yards on 226 rushes for a career 6.3 yards per attempt average, including 1,416 yards on 216 rushes during the 1990 season.

In 1991, he was a consensus All-American. As the senior offensive captain, he was a finalist for both the Outland Trophy and the Lombardi Award. He was the January 1, 1991 Gator Bowl co-MVP and a Senior Bowl participant. The following season, he was a member of the offensive line that protected Elvis Grbac while he was connecting with Heisman Trophy winner Desmond Howard. Also during that season, Tyrone Wheatley set the Michigan freshman yards per carry (minimum 50 attempts) with 555 yards on 86 carries for a 6.4 yards per attempt average behind Skrepenak after Dingman graduated. In 2000, he was voted onto the Wolverine's "All-Century Team".

== Professional football ==
Skrepenak was selected in the 1992 NFL draft with the 32nd overall pick in the second round by the Los Angeles Raiders. He stayed with the franchise for four seasons, which included a relocation from Los Angeles to Oakland. During training camp of the 1993 NFL season he was moving into the starting lineup due to an injury to Gerald Perry. However, he was injured during his second preseason start when Charles Haley bull rushed him, which caused him to get tangled up between Jeff Hostetler and the turf and which resulted in a dislocated ankle joint that kept him out for the season. Skrepenak did not become a starter for the Raiders until midway through the 1994 NFL season when he replaced Bruce Wilkerson. He started the final 10 games of 1994 and the first 14 games of the 1995 NFL season before being benched toward the end of the season in favor of Robert Jenkins. Skrepenak was deactivated from the roster for the final two games of the season right before his contract expired. Officially, the deactivation was due to a combination of a rib injury and the flu, but some say it may have also been partially due to vocal play selection criticism. However, head coach Mike White and assistant coach Joe Bugel said the benching was merely a function of the full strength depth chart upon the return of Gerald Perry. Skrepenak was a vocal detractor on the organization after leaving the Raiders. Among the opinions Skrepenak expressed during his time with the Raiders was that the Raiders overemphasized slogans related to team history while setting penalty records as a team.

The Panthers signed him in the offseason after the 1995 NFL season as an unrestricted free agent. While he was a Panther, he and Blake Brockermeyer were considered the key components of the offensive line. He was the only Panther to start every game of both the 1996 and 1997 National Football League seasons. He was named to the Panther's All-Time Team. He was released from the team due to salary cap considerations. Skrepenak was rumored to be sought after by the Miami Dolphins in 1998. However, he spent the year out of football. Skrepenak was in the Oakland Raiders' 1999 summer camp, but during his comeback attempt he had to leave the Raiders camp in on August 10, 1999, to attend to personal business back in Wilkes-Barre for several days. Skrepenak was a supporter of the new Jon Gruden coaching administration upon his return to the Raiders despite the fact that he was not as highly paid or expected to start. Skrepenak was a popular offensive lineman with the Raiders and his spot was held in his absence with a special tribute by Steve Wisniewski and Mo Collins who both wore his jersey number in his absence. Skrepenak returned to camp for a few weeks. On August 31, he was released.

During Skrepenak's career, he played for only one playoff team. Coach, Dom Capers' 1996 Carolina Panthers went 12–4 during the 1996 NFL season but lost to the Green Bay Packers in the National Football Conference Championship game of the 1996-97 NFL playoffs. That season Skrepenak helped protect the team's only Pro Bowler, quarterback Kerry Collins. Although Skrepenak missed the 1993 NFL season due to injury, Art Shell's 1993 Los Angeles Raiders went 10–6 and advanced one round in the 1993-94 NFL playoffs before losing to the Buffalo Bills. Skrepenak played offensive tackle during his years with the Raiders and offensive guard during his years with the Panthers. He has regularly played on the right side of the line.

== Political career ==
Upon retirement, Skrepenak returned to Luzerne County, where his ancestry traces back several generations. He subsequently began a career in local politics, was elected to the Luzerne County Board of Commissioners in 2003 and served as its chairman beginning January 6, 2004. Elected on an anti-drug and anti-crime platform, he also earmarked $2.5 million in Community Development funding for the Wilkes-Barre Movies 14 Complex. He was also involved in efforts to bring a new airport to Hazleton, Pennsylvania.

Skrepenak announced a bid for re-election in the November 6, 2007 election, running jointly with County Controller Maryanne Petrilla, and the pair won the primary. During his campaign a controversy arose surrounding the use of commissioners' debit cards. Skrepenak's expenses totalled $22,139.93, including $3,743 for gang-related training in Los Angeles, California, $524.08 for an accounting standards manual and $798.63 for communications equipment.

Skrepenak had considered running for Don Sherwood's United States House of Representatives seat that was contested and won by Chris Carney in the 2006 elections. However, after meetings with the National Democratic Congressional Campaign Committee he decided not to run for the United States Congress in the heavily Republican district. Congressman Sherwood's defeat resulted in the district flipping Democratic for the first time since 1961. Skrepenak was re-elected by finishing among the top three in a contest for county commissioner. The unofficial results were Maryanne Petrilla (D) 33,827 votes (29%), Greg Skrepenak (D / Inc.) 32,281 (27%), Stephen Urban (R / Inc.) 27,835 (24%) and Bill Jones (R) 24,071 (20%).

=== Corruption scandal ===
On December 17, 2009, Skrepenak announced he was resigning his position with the Luzerne County Commissioners effective immediately. The resignation came one day after Skrepenak signed a plea agreement with the U.S. Attorney’s office as part a pay to play corruption investigation in Luzerne County. Skrepenak stated that he resigned due to a clash between longtime cultural practices in county politics and the higher standards of public office and the law. Specifically, he was formally charged with accepting a $5,000 bribe from a developer for voting to accept the developer's project into a government funded tax incentive program.

On August 6, 2010, Skrepenak was sentenced to 24 months in federal prison. United States Federal Sentencing Guidelines called for a 33- to 41-month sentence. However, his sentence was reduced for cooperation with an ongoing federal corruption probe. He was not granted leniency for charitable works, medical complications or devotion to family. On June 12, 2012, he was released from a halfway house after being transferred from federal prison in Beckley, West Virginia in early April. He then served three years probation. Since his release, he has worked as a legal researcher for a Kingston law firm.
