= Michigan Wolverines football =

Football team of the University of Michigan

2026 Michigan Wolverines football team
- First season: 1879; 147 years ago
- Athletic director: Warde Manuel
- General manager: Dave Peloquin
- Head coach: Kyle Whittingham; 1st season, 6–5 (.545)
- Location: Ann Arbor, Michigan
- Stadium: Michigan Stadium (capacity: 107,601)
- NCAA division: Division I FBS
- Conference: Big Ten
- Colors: Maize and blue
- All-time record: 1,027–367–36 (.731)
- CFP record: 2–2 (.500)
- Bowl record: 24–30 (.444)

National championships
- Claimed: 1901, 1902, 1903, 1904, 1918, 1923, 1932, 1933, 1947, 1948, 1997, 2023
- Unclaimed: 1910, 1925, 1926, 1964, 1973, 1985

National finalist
- Poll era: 1985
- CFP: 2023

College Football Playoff appearances
- 2021, 2022, 2023

Conference championships
- Big Ten: 1898, 1901, 1902, 1903, 1904, 1906, 1918, 1922, 1923, 1925, 1926, 1930, 1931, 1932, 1933, 1943, 1947, 1948, 1949, 1950, 1964, 1969, 1971, 1972, 1973, 1974, 1976, 1977, 1978, 1980, 1982, 1986, 1988, 1989, 1990, 1991, 1992, 1997, 1998, 2000, 2003, 2004, 2021, 2022, 2023

Division championships
- Big Ten East: 2018, 2021, 2022, 2023
- Heisman winners: Tom Harmon – 1940; Desmond Howard – 1991; Charles Woodson – 1997
- Consensus All-Americans: 89
- Rivalries: See § Rivalries: Ohio State (rivalry); Michigan State (rivalry)

Uniforms
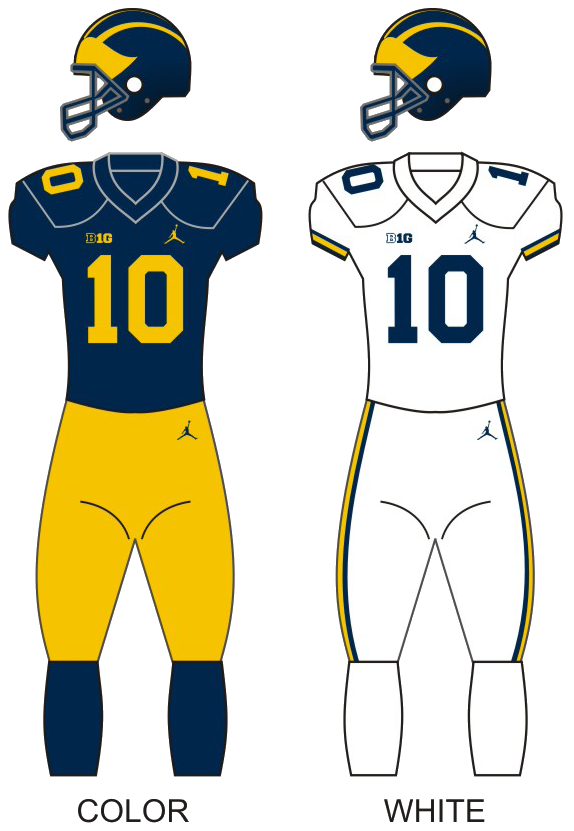
- Fight song: "The Victors"
- Marching band: Michigan Marching Band
- Outfitter: Jordan Brand
- Website: MGoBlue.com

The Michigan Wolverines football team represents the University of Michigan in college football at the NCAA Division I Football Bowl Subdivision (FBS) level. Michigan has the most all-time wins in college football history. The team is known for its distinctive winged helmet, its fight song, its record-breaking attendance figures at Michigan Stadium, and its many rivalries, particularly its annual, regular season-ending game against Ohio State, known simply as "The Game," once voted as ESPN's best sports rivalry.

Michigan began competing in intercollegiate football in 1879. The Wolverines joined the Big Ten Conference at its inception in 1896 and, other than a hiatus from 1907 to 1916, have been members since. Michigan has won or shared 45 league titles, and since the inception of the AP poll in 1936, has finished in the top ten a total of 39 times. The Wolverines claim twelve national championships, including three (1948, 1997, 2023) from the major wire-services: the AP Trophy or Coaches' Trophy.

From 1900 to 1989, Michigan was led by a series of nine head coaches, each of whom has been inducted into the College Football Hall of Fame either as a player or as a coach. Fielding H. Yost became Michigan's head coach in 1901 and guided his "Point-a-Minute" squads to a streak of 56 games without a defeat, spanning from his arrival until the season finale in 1905, including a victory in the 1902 Rose Bowl, the first college football bowl game ever played. Fritz Crisler brought his winged helmet from Princeton University in 1938 and led the 1947 Wolverines to a national title and Michigan's second Rose Bowl win. Bo Schembechler coached the team for 21 seasons (1969–1989) in which he won 13 Big Ten titles and 194 games, a program record. The first decade of his tenure was underscored by a fierce competition with his former mentor, Woody Hayes, whose Ohio State Buckeyes squared off against Schembechler's Wolverines in a stretch of the Michigan–Ohio State rivalry dubbed "The Ten Year War".

Following Schembechler's retirement, the program was coached by two of his former assistants, Gary Moeller and then Lloyd Carr, who maintained the program's overall success over the next 18 years, Carr winning a national championship in 1997. However, the program's fortunes declined under the next two coaches, Rich Rodriguez and Brady Hoke, who were both fired after relatively short tenures. Following Hoke's dismissal, Michigan hired Jim Harbaugh. Harbaugh is a former quarterback for the team, having played for Michigan from 1982 to 1986 under Schembechler. Harbaugh led the Wolverines to three consecutive Big Ten titles and College Football Playoff appearances during his final three years as head coach, from 2021 to 2023. His final team, the 2023 Michigan Wolverines won the program's first national championship since 1997, and first undisputed national championship since 1948 after beating Washington in the National Championship Game. Following the championship and nine seasons at Michigan, Harbaugh left to return to coaching in the National Football League (NFL). The Wolverines promoted offensive coordinator Sherrone Moore to head coach, who had been on Harbaugh's coaching staff since 2018, and was the acting head coach in four games during the national championship-winning 2023 season. After the 2025 regular season, Moore was fired and replaced by longtime Utah head coach Kyle Whittingham.

The Michigan Wolverines have featured 89 selections that have garnered consensus honors on the College Football All-America Team. Three Wolverines have won the Heisman Trophy: Tom Harmon in 1940, Desmond Howard in 1991, and Charles Woodson in 1997. Gerald Ford, who later became the 38th president of the United States, started at center and was voted most valuable player by his teammates on the 1934 team.

== History ==
=== Early history (1879–1900) ===
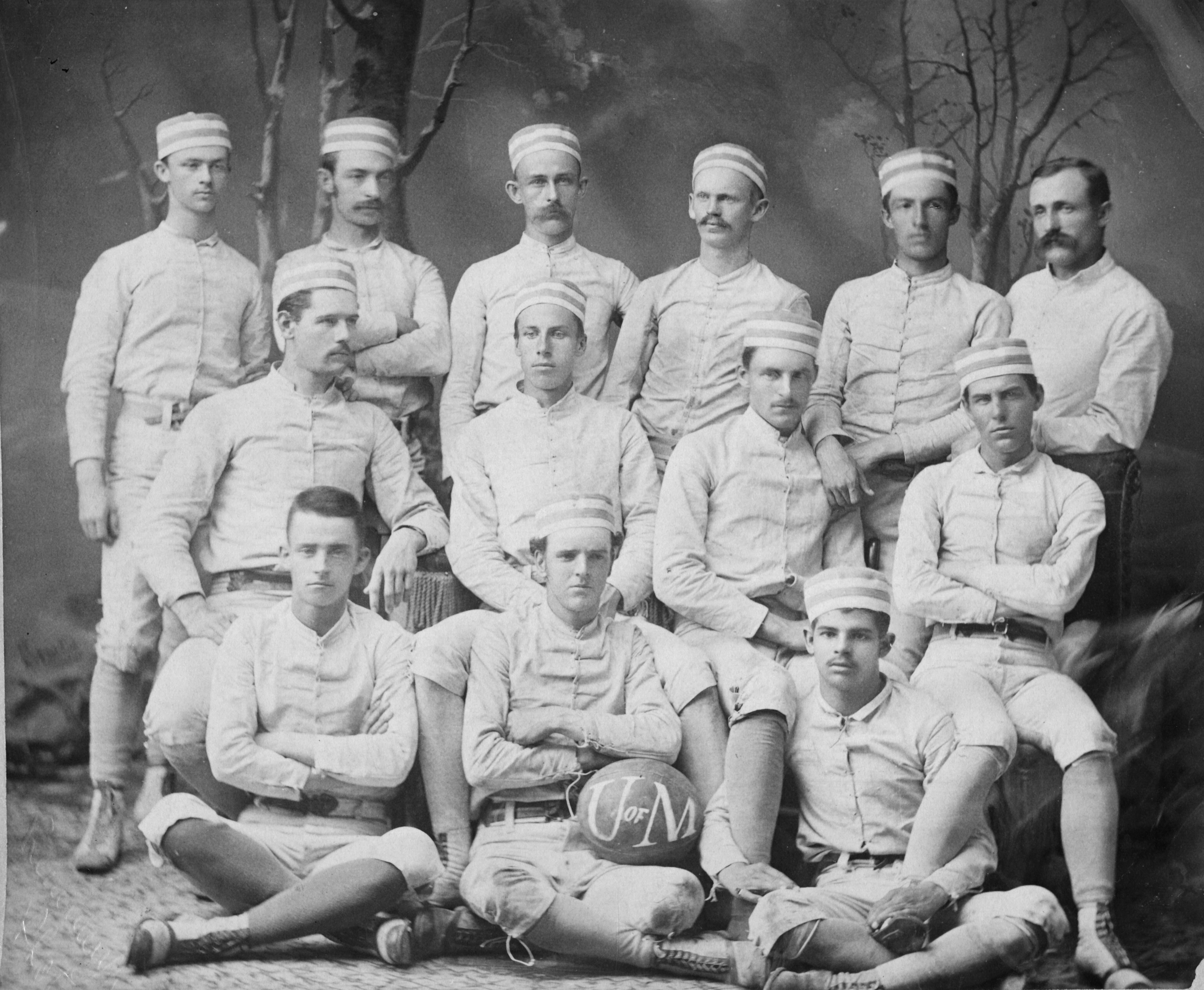
The 1879 squad, the first team fielded by the university

On May 30, 1879, Michigan played its first intercollegiate football game against Racine College at White Stocking Park in Chicago. The Chicago Tribune called it "the first rugby-football game to be played west of the Alleghenies." Midway through "the first 'inning'," Irving Kane Pond scored the first touchdown for Michigan. According to Will Perry's history of Michigan football, the crowd responded to Pond's plays with cheers of "Pond Forever." In 1881, Michigan played against Harvard in Boston. The game that marked the birth of intersectional football. On their way to a game in Chicago in 1887, Michigan players stopped in South Bend, Indiana and introduced football to students at the University of Notre Dame. A November 23 contest marked the inception of the Notre Dame Fighting Irish football program and the beginning of the Michigan–Notre Dame rivalry. In 1894, Michigan defeated Cornell, which was the "first time in collegiate football history that a western school defeated an established power from the east."

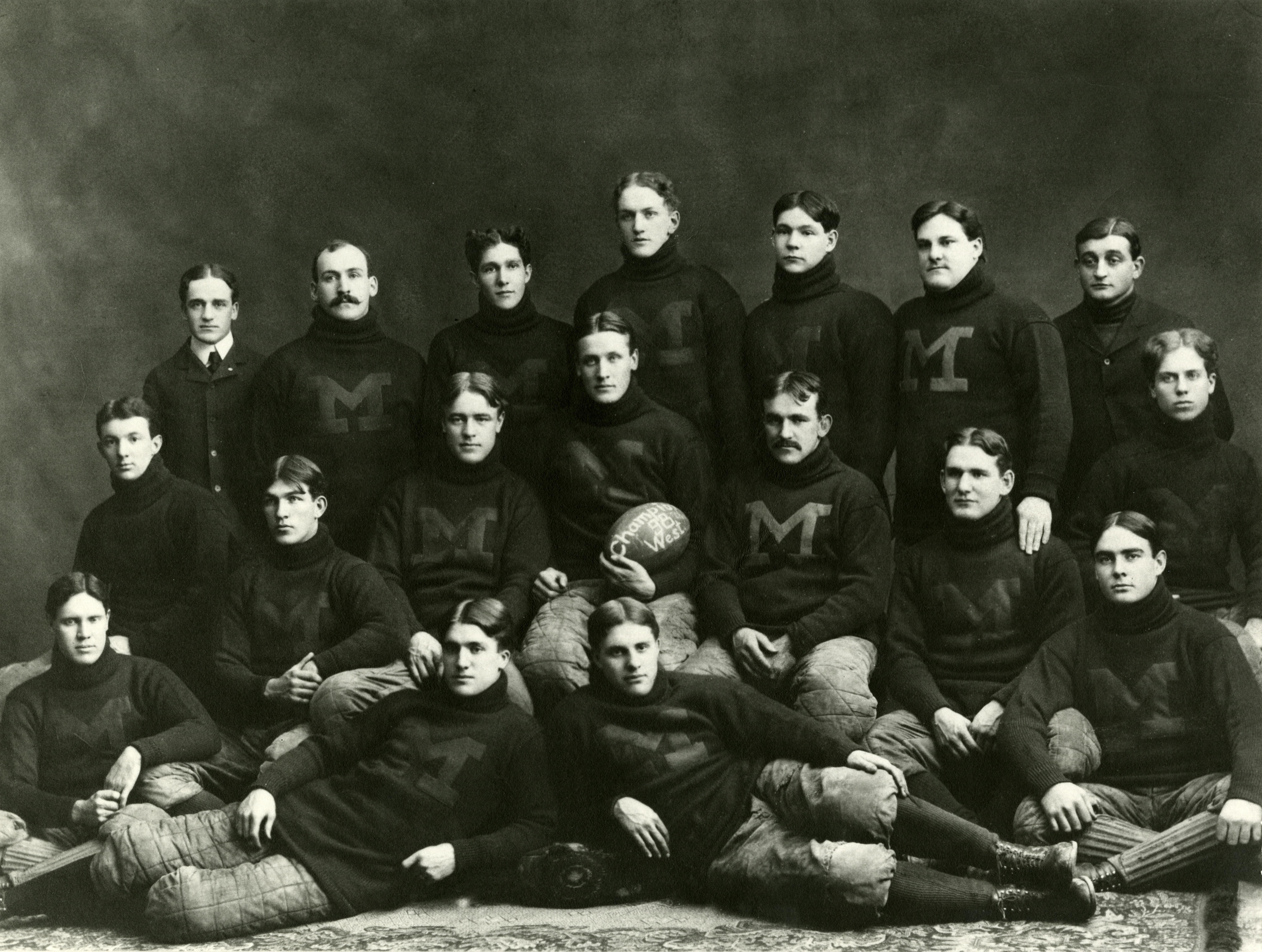
The 1898 Michigan Wolverines, the first Michigan team to win a conference title

In 1896, the Intercollegiate Conference of Faculty Representatives—then commonly known as the Western Conference and later as the Big Ten Conference—was formed by the University of Michigan, the University of Chicago, the University of Illinois, the University of Minnesota, the University of Wisconsin, Northwestern University, and Purdue University. The first Western Conference football season was played in 1896, with Michigan going 9–1, but losing out on the inaugural Western Conference title with a loss to the Chicago Maroons to end the season. By 1898 Amos Alonzo Stagg was fast at work at turning the University of Chicago football program into a powerhouse. Before the final game of the 1898 season, Chicago was 9–1–1 and Michigan was 9–0; a game between the two teams in Chicago decided the third Western Conference championship. Michigan won, 12–11, capturing the program's first conference championship in a game that inspired "The Victors", which later became the school's fight song. Michigan went 8–2 and 7–2–1 in 1899 and 1900, results that were considered unsatisfactory relative to the 10–0 season of 1898.

=== Yost era (1901–1928) ===
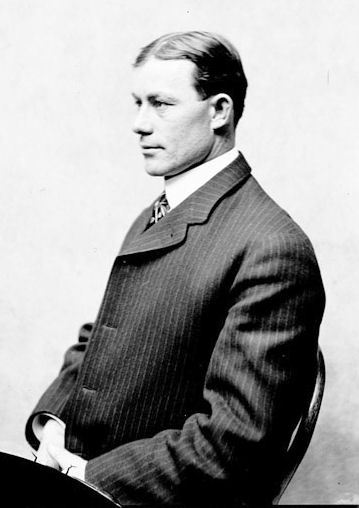
Fielding Yost in 1902.

After the 1900 season, Charles A. Baird, Michigan's first athletic director, wrote to Fielding H. Yost, then head coach at San Jose Normal School in California (now San Jose State University). Saying that "our people are greatly roused up over the defeats of the past two years", Baird gave Yost an offer to come to Michigan to coach the football team. The New York Times reported that Michigan's margin of victory was "one of the most remarkable ever made in the history of football in the important colleges." At the end of the season, Michigan participated in the inaugural Rose Bowl. Michigan dominated the game so thoroughly that Stanford's captain requested the game be called with eight minutes remaining. Neil Snow scored five touchdowns in the game, which is still the all-time Rose Bowl record. The next year, 1902, Michigan outscored its opponents 644 to 12 and finished the season 11–0. In 1903, Michigan played a game against Minnesota that started the rivalry for the Little Brown Jug, the oldest rivalry trophy in college football. The game marked the only time from 1901 to 1904 that Michigan failed to win. Michigan finished the season at 11–0–1. In 1904, Michigan once again went undefeated at 10–0 while recording one of the most lopsided defeats in college football history, a 130–0 defeat of the West Virginia Mountaineers.

From 1901 through 1904, Michigan didn't lose a single game. The streak was finally halted at the end of the 1905 season by Amos Alonzo Stagg's Chicago Maroons, a team that went on to win two Big 9 (as the Western Conference was now being called with the addition of Iowa and Indiana) titles in the next three years. The game, dubbed "The First Greatest Game of the Century," broke Michigan's 56-game unbeaten streak and marked the end of the "Point-a-Minute" years. The 1905 Michigan team had outscored opponents 495–0 in its first 12 games. The game was lost in the final ten minutes of play when Denny Clark was tackled for a safety as he attempted to return a punt from behind the goal line. Michigan tied for another Big 9 title in 1906 before opting to go independent for the 1907 season. The independent years were not as kind to Yost as his years in the Big 9. Michigan suffered one loss in 1907. In 1908, Michigan got battered by Penn (a team that went 11–0–1 that year) in a game in which Michigan center Germany Schulz took such a battering as to have to be dragged off the field. In 1909, Michigan suffered its first loss to Notre Dame, leading Yost to refuse to schedule another game against Notre Dame; the schools did not play again until 1942. In 1910, Michigan played their only undefeated season of the independent years, going 3–0–3. Overall from 1907 to 1916, Michigan lost at least one game every year (with the exception of 1910).

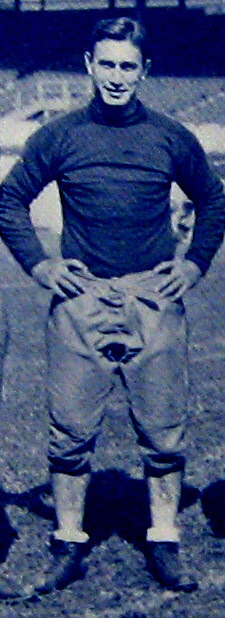
Benny Friedman in 1929.

Michigan rejoined the Big 9 in 1917, after which it was called the Big Ten. Yost immediately got back to work. In 1918, Michigan played the first game against Stagg's Chicago Maroons since Chicago ended Michigan's winning streak in 1905. Michigan defeated the Maroons, 18–0, on the way to a 5–0 record. The next three years were lean, with Michigan going 3–4, 5–2, and 5–1–1, in 1919, 1920, and 1921. However, in 1922 Michigan managed to spoil the "Dedication Day" for Ohio Stadium, defeating the Buckeyes 19–0. Legend has it that the rotunda at Ohio Stadium is painted with maize flowers on a blue background due to the outcome of the 1922 dedication game. Michigan went 5–0–1 in 1922, capturing a Big Ten title. In 1923, Michigan went 8–0, winning another conference championship. The 1924 Wolverines, coached by George Little, saw their 20-game unbeaten streak end at the hands of Red Grange. After the 1924 season, Little left Michigan to accept the head coach and athletic director positions at Wisconsin, returning athletic director Yost to the head coaching position. Although the 1925 and 1926 seasons did not include a conference title, they were memorable due to the presence of the famous "Benny-to-Bennie" combination, a reference to Benny Friedman and Bennie Oosterbaan. The two helped popularize passing the ball in an era when running held dominance. Oosterbaan became a three-time All-American and was selected for the All-Time All-American team in 1951, while Friedman went on to have a Hall of Fame NFL career. Also during 1926, Michigan was retroactively awarded national titles for the 1901 and 1902 seasons via the Houlgate System, the first national titles awarded to the program. Other major selectors (such as the National Championship Foundation and Jeff Sagarin) later retroactively awarded Michigan with titles in the 1903, 1904, 1918, 1923, 1925, and 1926 seasons. Michigan claims titles in the 1901, 1902, 1903, 1904, 1918, and 1923 seasons.

Yost stepped aside in 1926 to focus on being Michigan's athletic director, a post he had held since 1921, thus ending the greatest period of success in the history of Michigan football. Under Yost, Michigan posted a 165–29–10 record, winning ten conference championships and six national championships. One of his main actions as athletic director was to oversee the construction of Michigan Stadium. Michigan began playing football games in Michigan Stadium in the fall of 1927. At the time Michigan Stadium had a capacity of 72,000, although Yost envisioned eventually expanding the stadium to a capacity well beyond 100,000. Michigan Stadium was formally dedicated during a game against the Ohio State Buckeyes that season to the tune of a 21–0 victory. Tad Wieman became Michigan's head coach in 1927. That year, Michigan posted a modest 6–2 record. However, the team ended 1928 with a losing 3–4–1 record and Wieman was fired.

=== Kipke years (1929–1937) ===
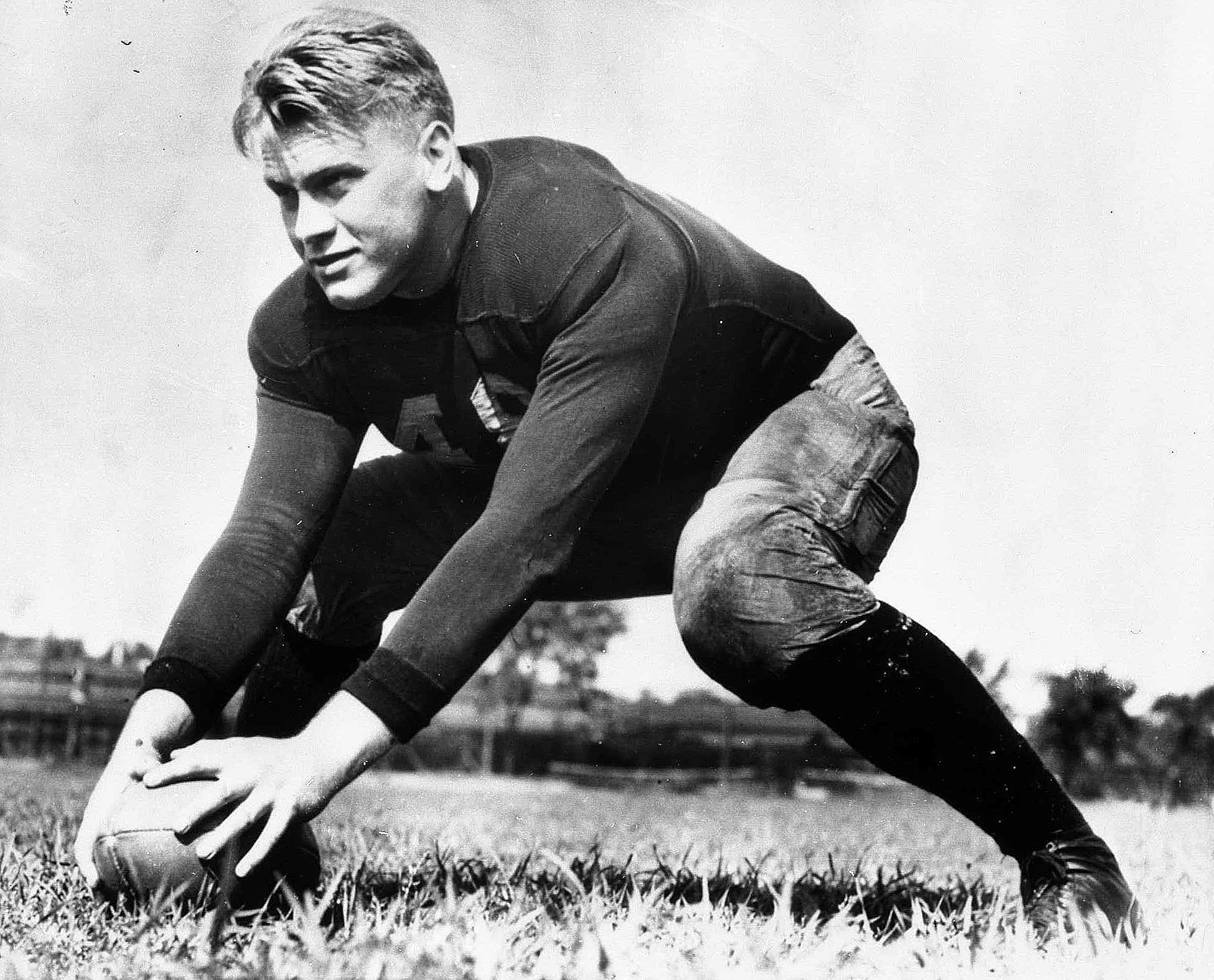
Future U.S. president Gerald Ford during practice as a center on Wolverines football team, 1933

In 1929, Harry Kipke, a former player under Yost, took over as head coach. From 1930 to 1933, Kipke returned Michigan to prominence. During that stretch, Michigan won the Big Ten title every year and the national championship in 1932 and 1933. In 1932, quarterback and future College Football Hall of Famer Harry Newman was a unanimous first-team All-American, and the recipient of the Douglas Fairbanks Trophy as Outstanding College Player of the Year (predecessor of the Heisman Trophy), and the Helms Athletic Foundation Player of the Year Award, the Chicago Tribune Silver Football trophy as the Most Valuable Player in the Big Ten Conference. During this span Kipke's teams only lost one game, to Ohio State. After 1933, however, Kipke's teams compiled a 12–22 record from 1934 to 1937. The 1934 Michigan team only won one game, against Georgia Tech in a controversial contest. Georgia Tech coach and athletic director W. A. "Bill" Alexander refused to allow his team to take the field if Willis Ward, an African-American player for Michigan, stepped on the field. Michigan conceded, and the incident reportedly caused Michigan player Gerald R. Ford to consider quitting the team. Overall, Kipke posted a 49–26–4 record at Michigan, winning four conference championships and two national championships.

=== Crisler years (1938–1947) ===
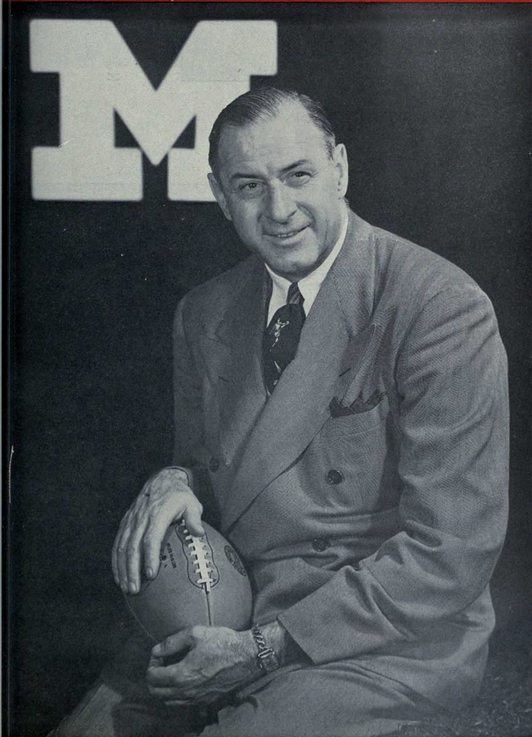
Fritz Crisler in 1948

In 1938, Michigan hired Fritz Crisler as Kipke's successor. Crisler had been head coach of the Princeton Tigers and reportedly wasn't excited to leave Princeton. Michigan invited him to name his price, and Crisler demanded what he thought would be unacceptable: the position of athletic director when Yost stepped down and the highest salary in college football. Michigan accepted, and Crisler became the new head coach of the Michigan football program.

Upon arriving at Michigan, Crisler introduced the winged football helmet, ostensibly to help his players find the receivers down field. Whatever the reasoning, the winged helmet has since become one of the iconic marks of Michigan football. Michigan debuted the winged helmet in a game against Michigan State in 1938. Two years later in 1940, Tom Harmon led the Wolverines to a 7–1 record on his way to winning the Heisman Trophy. Harmon ended the season by scoring three rushing touchdowns, two passing touchdowns, four extra points, intercepting three passes, and punting three times for an average of 50 yards in a game against the Ohio State Buckeyes. The 1943 season included a No. 1 (Notre Dame) vs. No. 2 (Michigan) match-up against Notre Dame, a game the Wolverines lost 35–12. Michigan ended the season at 8–1, winning Crisler's first Big Ten championship.

Crisler had reversed the misfortune of the end of the Kipke era and returned Michigan to one and two-loss seasons. From 1938 to 1944, Michigan posted a 48–11–2 record, although the period lacked a national title and only contained one conference title. Yet, Crisler's biggest mark on the game of football was made in 1945, when Michigan faced a loaded Army squad that featured two Heisman trophy winners, Doc Blanchard and Glenn Davis. Crisler didn't feel that his Michigan team could match up with Army, so he opted to take advantage of a 1941 NCAA rule that allowed players to enter or leave at any point during the game. Crisler divided his team into "offensive" and "defensive" specialists, an act that earned him the nickname "the father of two-platoon football." Michigan still lost the game with Army 28–7, but Crisler's use of two-platoon football shaped the way the game was played in the future. Eventually, Crisler's use of the platoon system propelled his team to a conference championship and a national title in 1947, his final season. The 1947 team, nicknamed the "Mad Magicians" due to their use of two-platoon football, capped their season with a 49–0 victory over the USC Trojans in the 1948 Rose Bowl. Crisler finished with a 116–32–9 record at Michigan, winning two conference titles and one national title.

=== Oosterbaan years (1948–1958) ===
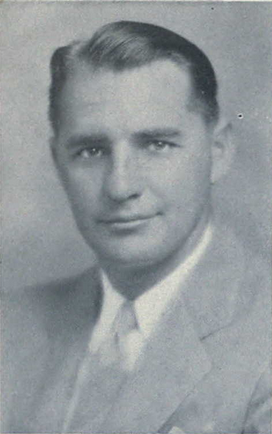
Bennie Oosterbaan

Crisler continued as athletic director while Bennie Oosterbaan, the same Bennie that had electrified the world while making connections with Benny Friedman 20 years earlier, took over the football program. Things started off well for Oosterbaan in 1948 with the Wolverines earning a quality mid-season victory over No. 3 Northwestern. Michigan finished the season undefeated at 9–0, thus winning another national championship. Initially, Oosterbaan continued Crisler's tradition of on-field success, winning conference titles each year from 1948 to 1950 and the national title in 1948. The 1950 season ended in interesting fashion, with Michigan and Ohio State combining for 45 punts in a game that came to be known as the "Snow Bowl." Michigan won the game 9–3, winning the Big Ten conference and sending the Wolverines off to the 1951 Rose Bowl. Subsequently, Michigan's football team began to decline under Oosterbaan. From 1951 to 1958, Michigan compiled a record of 42–26–2, a far cry from the success under Crisler and Yost. Perhaps more importantly, Oosterbaan posted a 2–5–1 record against Michigan State and a 3–5 record against Ohio State over the same time period. Under mounting pressure, Oosterbaan stepped down after 1958.

=== Elliott years (1959–1968) ===
In place of Oosterbaan stepped Bump Elliott, a former Michigan player of Crisler's. Elliott continued many of the struggles that began under Oosterbaan, posting a 51–42–2 record from 1959 through 1968 (including a 2–7–1 record against Michigan State and a 3–7 record against Ohio State). Michigan's only Big Ten title under Elliott came in 1964, a season that included a win over Oregon State in the 1965 Rose Bowl. Following a 50-14 drubbing at the hands of Ohio State in 1968, Elliott resigned.

=== Schembechler era (1969–1989) ===
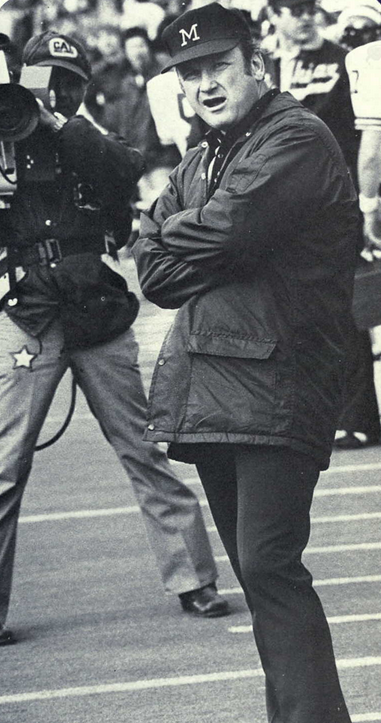
Bo Schembechler in 1975.

It only took 15 minutes for Don Canham to be sold on Bo Schembechler, resulting in Schembechler becoming the 15th coach in Michigan football history. At the time, Schembechler's employer, the Miami RedHawks, could have thrown more money at Schembechler, but Canham managed to sell Schembechler on Michigan's tradition and prestige. Schembechler's first team got off to a moderate start, losing to rival Michigan State and entering the Ohio State game with a 7–2 record. Ohio State, coached by icon Woody Hayes, entered the game at 8–0 and poised to repeat as national champions. The 1969 Ohio State team was hailed by some as being the "greatest college football team ever assembled" and came into the game favored by 17 points over Michigan. Michigan shocked the Buckeyes, winning 24–12, going to the Rose Bowl, and launching The Ten Year War between Hayes and Schembechler. From 1969 to 1978, one of either Ohio State or Michigan won at least a share of the Big Ten title and represented the Big Ten in the Rose Bowl every season. In 1970 Schembechler failed to repeat on the magic of 1969, that year losing to Ohio State 20–9 and finishing at 9–1. However, in 1971, Schembechler led Michigan to an undefeated regular season, only to lose to the Stanford Indians in the Rose Bowl to finish at 11–1. From 1972 to 1975, Michigan failed to win a game against Ohio State (powered by phenom running back Archie Griffin). However, Michigan did tie Ohio State in 1973, only missing out on the Rose Bowl due to a controversial vote that sent Ohio State to the Rose Bowl and left Michigan at home. Another notable event occurred during the 1975 season, with the first of Michigan's record streak of games with more than 100,000 people in attendance occurring during a game against the Purdue Boilermakers.

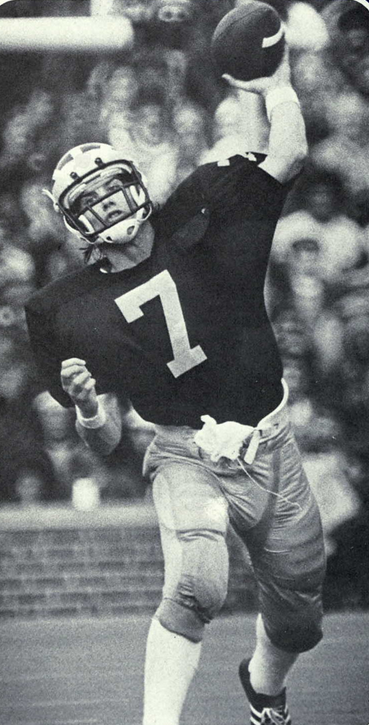
Rick Leach, who played quarterback for Michigan from 1975 through 1978.

From 1976 to 1978, Michigan asserted its own dominance of the rivalry, beating Ohio State, going to the Rose Bowl, and posting a 10–2 record every year. After the 1978 season, Woody Hayes was fired for punching an opposing player during the 1978 Gator Bowl, thus ending The Ten Year War. Michigan had a slight edge in the war, with Schembechler going 5–4–1 against Hayes. However, while Schembechler successfully placed great emphasis on the rivalry, Michigan's bowl performances were sub-par. Michigan failed to win their last game of the season every year during The Ten Year War. The only year in which Michigan didn't lose its last game of the season was the 1973 tie against Ohio State. After the end of the Ten Year War, Michigan's regular season performance declined, but its post season performance improved. The 1979 season included a memorable game against Indiana that ended with a touchdown pass from John Wangler to Anthony Carter with six seconds left in the game. Michigan went 8–4 on the season, losing to North Carolina in the 1979 Gator Bowl. In 1980, Michigan went 10–2 and got their first win in the Rose Bowl under Schembechler, a 23–6 win over Washington. Michigan went 9–3 in 1981 to get Schembechler's second bowl win in the 1981 Bluebonnet Bowl. In 1982, Michigan won the Big Ten championship while being led by three-time All-American wide receiver Anthony Carter. Michigan fell to UCLA Bruins in the 1983 Rose Bowl. Without Anthony Carter, the Wolverines did not win the Big Ten title in 1983, going 9–3. In 1984, the Wolverines suffered their worst season under Schembechler, going 6–6 with a loss to national champion BYU in the 1984 Holiday Bowl.

Michigan needed to reverse its fortunes in 1985, and they began doing so with new quarterback Jim Harbaugh. Harbaugh led the Wolverines to a 5–0 record, propelling them to a No. 2 ranking heading into a game with the No. 1 Iowa Hawkeyes. Michigan lost 12–10, but did not lose another game the rest of the season to finish at 10–1–1 with a victory over Tom Osborne's Nebraska Cornhuskers in the 1986 Fiesta Bowl. In 1986 Michigan won the Big Ten at 11–2, suffering a loss to the Arizona State Sun Devils in the 1987 Rose Bowl. The departure of Harbaugh after 1986 once again left Michigan on tough times, by Michigan standards, as Schembechler's team stumbled to an 8–4 record in 1987. However, Michigan bounced back again in 1988 and 1989, winning the Big Ten title outright both years at 9–2–1 and 10–2 with trips to Rose Bowl. From 1981 through 1989, Michigan went 80–27–2, winning four Big Ten titles and going to a bowl game every year (with another Rose Bowl win obtained against USC Trojans after the 1988 season). Bo Schembechler retired after the 1989 season, handing the job over to his offensive coordinator Gary Moeller. Under Schembechler, Michigan posted a 194–48–5 record (11–9–1 against Ohio State), and won 13 Big Ten championships.

=== Moeller years (1990–1994) ===
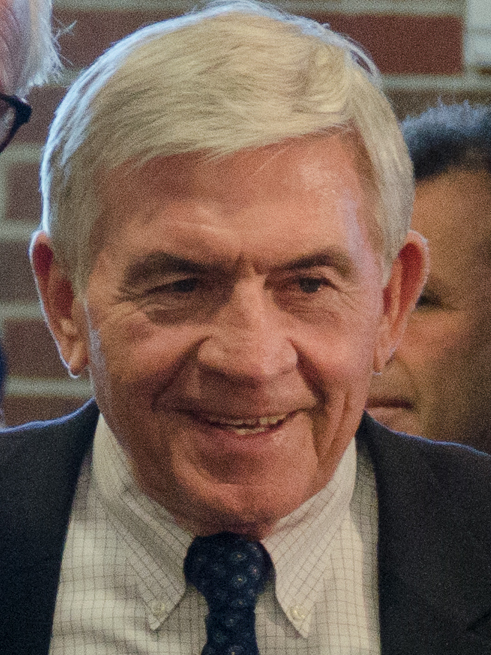
Coach Moeller

Gary Moeller took over from Schembechler for the 1990 season, becoming the 16th head coach in Michigan football history. Moeller inherited a talented squad that had just played in the 1990 Rose Bowl, including wide receiver Desmond Howard. Moeller led Michigan to a 9–3 record in his first season, tying for the Big Ten championship but losing out on a Rose Bowl bid to Iowa. The next two years, Moeller's teams won the conference outright, setting marks of 10–2 and 9–0–3. In 1991, Desmond Howard had a memorable season that propelled him to win the Heisman Trophy, the award given to college football's most outstanding player. The 1992 team, led by quarterback Elvis Grbac, posted a 9–0–3 record, defeating Washington in the 1993 Rose Bowl. Moeller led Michigan to 8–4 records in both 1993 and 1994. The 1994 season was marked by an early-season loss to Colorado that included a Hail Mary pass from Kordell Stewart to Michael Westbrook to end the game, leading to the game being dubbed "The Miracle at Michigan." Moeller was forced out after the 1994 season when intoxicated at a Southfield, MI restaurant in an incident in which Moeller was caught on tape throwing a punch in a police station. According to his lawyers, Moeller was fired, but allowed to publicly save face by resigning.

=== Carr years (1995–2007) ===
Michigan's athletic director appointed Lloyd Carr, an assistant at Michigan since 1980, as interim head coach for the 1995 season. However, after an 8–2 start, Michigan dropped the interim tag from Carr's title and named him its 17th head coach. Michigan finished his first season at 9–4. Carr had similar success in his second season, going 8–4 and earning a trip to the 1997 Outback Bowl. Carr returned a strong squad for the 1997 season, led by cornerback and punt returner Charles Woodson. Michigan went undefeated in 1997. Overall, the Michigan defense only allowed 9.5 points per game and ended the season ranked No. 1 in the AP Poll, giving Michigan its first national championship since 1948 with a victory in the 1998 Rose Bowl. For his efforts, Woodson won the Heisman Trophy and was selected 4th overall in the 1998 NFL draft by the Oakland Raiders.

With Tom Brady as quarterback, Michigan went 10–3 and repeated as Big Ten champions in 1998, but in 1999 Michigan lost out on the conference championship at 10–2 to the Wisconsin Badgers. Drew Henson led Michigan to a 9–3 record and a tie for the Big Ten championship in 2000. Ohio State, Michigan's chief rival, fired their coach John Cooper, who was 2–10–1 against Michigan while at Ohio State, after the 2000 season and replaced him with Jim Tressel. Tressel immediately ushered in a new era in the Ohio State-Michigan rivalry, upsetting the Wolverines 26–20 in 2001. This came on the heels of another last-second loss in which Michigan State defeated Michigan with a pass in the last second of the game in a controversial finish that led to the game being referred to as "Clockgate." Despite these setbacks, Michigan's 2001 squad, led by John Navarre, went 8–4 with an appearance in the 2002 Florida Citrus Bowl. Again under Navarre in 2002, Michigan compiled a 10–3 record, but included another loss to Ohio State, who went on to win the national championship. Carr got over the hump against Tressel in 2003 as John Navarre and Doak Walker Award winner Chris Perry led the Wolverines to a 10–3 record, a Big Ten championship, and an appearance in the 2004 Rose Bowl.

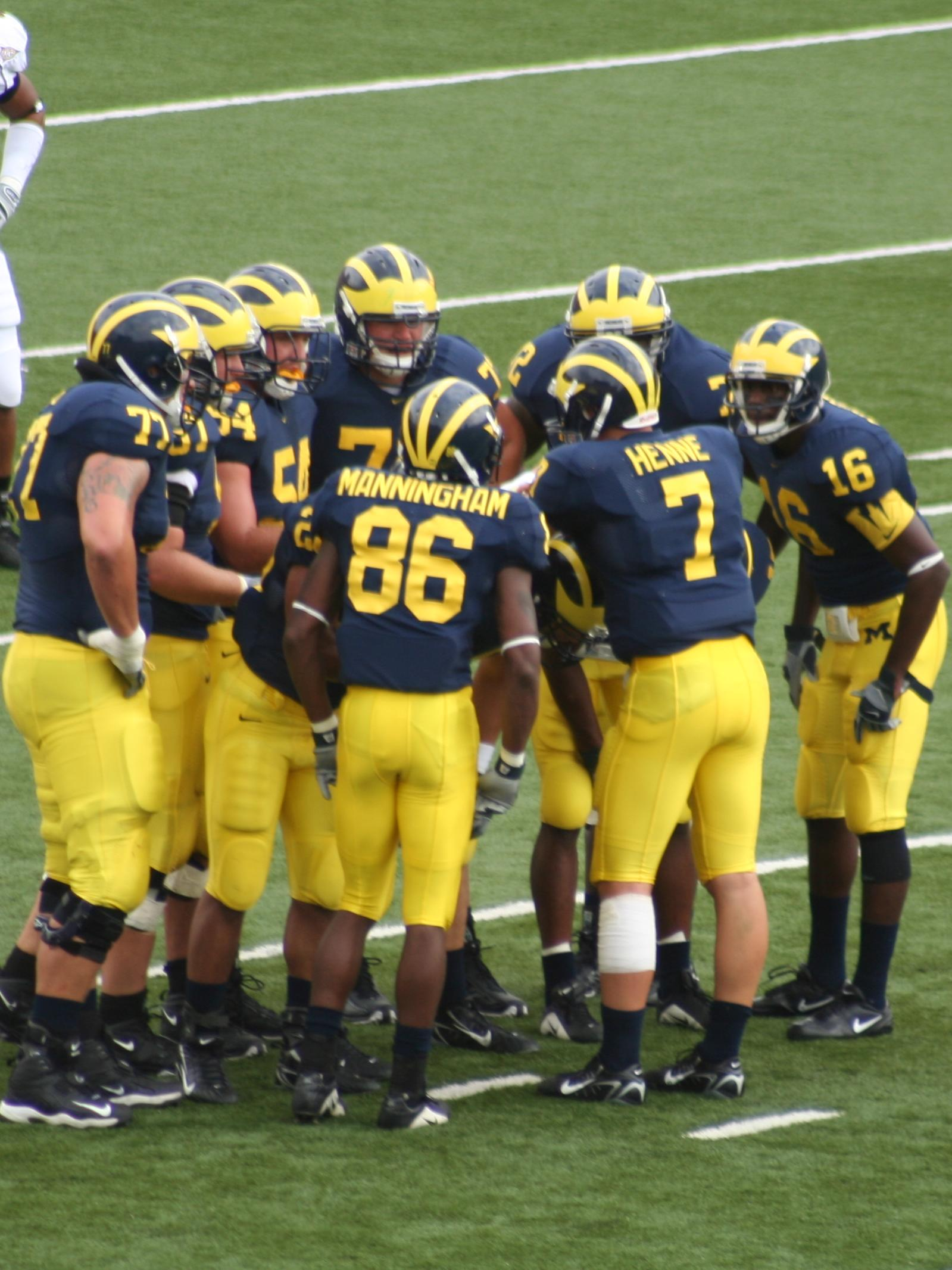
2006 Michigan Wolverines huddle during a game against the Central Michigan Chippewas.

For the 2004 season, Carr turned to highly rated recruit Chad Henne to lead the Wolverines at quarterback. Michigan went 9–3 in 2004 to tie for another Big Ten championship and earn a trip to the 2005 Rose Bowl, but the season again included a loss to Ohio State, who only went 8–4 on the season.

In 2005, Michigan struggled to make a bowl game, only going 7–5, with the season capped with another loss to Ohio State. Expectations were tempered going into the 2006 season; however, a 47–21 blowout of No. 2 Notre Dame and an 11–0 start propelled Michigan to the No. 2 rankings going into "The Game" with No. 1 Ohio State. The 2006 Ohio State-Michigan game was hailed by the media as the "Game of the Century." The day before the game, Bo Schembechler died, leading Ohio State to honor him with a moment of silence, one of the few Michigan Men to be so honored in Ohio Stadium. The game itself was a back-and-forth affair, with Ohio State winning 42–39 for the right to play in the 2007 BCS National Championship Game. Michigan lost to USC in the 2007 Rose Bowl, ending the season at 11–2.

Going into 2007, Michigan had high expectations. Standout players Chad Henne, Mike Hart, and Jake Long all opted to return for their senior seasons for one last crack at Ohio State and a chance at a national championship, causing Michigan to be ranked fifth in the preseason polls. However, Michigan's struggles against the spread offense reared its ugly head again as the Wolverines shockingly lost the opener to the Appalachian State Mountaineers. The game marked the first win by a Division I-AA team over a team ranked in the Associated Press Poll. The next week, Michigan was blown out by Oregon. Despite the early rough start, Michigan won their next eight games and went into the Ohio State game with a chance to win the Big Ten championship. However, Michigan once again fell to the Buckeyes, this time 14–3. After the game, Lloyd Carr announced that he would retire as Michigan head coach after the bowl game. In the 2008 Capital One Bowl, Carr's final game, Michigan defeated the defending national champion Florida Gators, led by Heisman Trophy winner Tim Tebow, 41–35. Carr's accomplishments at Michigan included a 122–40 record, five Big Ten championships, and one national championship.

=== Rodriguez years (2008–2010) ===
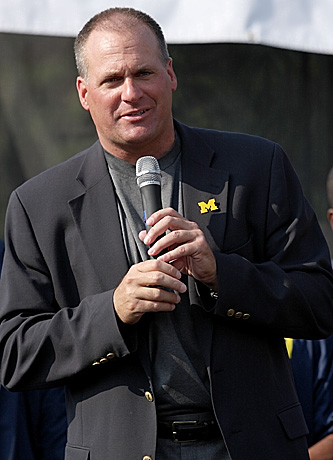
Rich Rodriguez at Michigan in 2008.

Following Carr's retirement, Michigan launched a national coaching search that ultimately saw Rich Rodriguez lured away from his alma mater, West Virginia. Rodriguez's arrival marked the beginning of major upheaval in the Michigan football program. Rodriguez, a proponent of the spread offense, installed it in place of the pro-style offense that had been used by Carr. The offseason saw significant attrition in Michigan's roster. The expected starting quarterback Ryan Mallett departed the program, stating that he would be unable to fit in a spread offense. Starting wide receivers Mario Manningham and Adrian Arrington both decided to forgo their senior seasons and enter the NFL draft. Michigan lost a good deal of its depth and, when the 2008 season began, was forced to start players with very little playing experience. The 2008 season was disappointing for Michigan, finishing at 3–9 and suffering its first losing campaign since 1967. Michigan also missed a bowl game invitation for the first time since 1974.The week before the 2009 season began, the Detroit Free Press accused the team of violating the NCAA's practice time limits. While the NCAA conducted investigations, Michigan won its first four games, including a last second victory against its rival Notre Dame. The season ended in disappointment, however, as Michigan went 1–7 in its last eight games and missed a bowl for the second straight season.

Rodriguez's final season began with new hope in the program, as Robinson was named the starting quarterback over Forcier. Robinson led the Wolverines to a 5–0 start, but after a defeat to Michigan State at home, the Wolverines finished the season 2–5 over their last seven games. Michigan did, however, qualify for a bowl game with a 7–5 record, and clinched its bowl berth in dramatic fashion against Illinois, with Michigan winning 67–65 in three overtime periods. The game was the highest combined scoring game in Michigan history, and saw Michigan's defense give up the most points in its history. Michigan was invited to the Gator Bowl to face Mississippi State, losing 52–14. The Michigan defense set new school records as the worst defense in Michigan history. In the middle of the season, the NCAA announced its penalties against Michigan for the practice time violations. The program was placed on three of years probation and docked 130 practice hours, which was twice the amount Michigan had exceeded.

Rodriguez was fired following the bowl game, with athletic director Dave Brandon citing Rodriguez's failure to meet expectations as the main reason for his dismissal. Rodriguez left the program winless against rivals Michigan State and Ohio State and compiled a 15–22 record, the worst record of any head coach in Michigan history.

=== Hoke years (2011–2014) ===
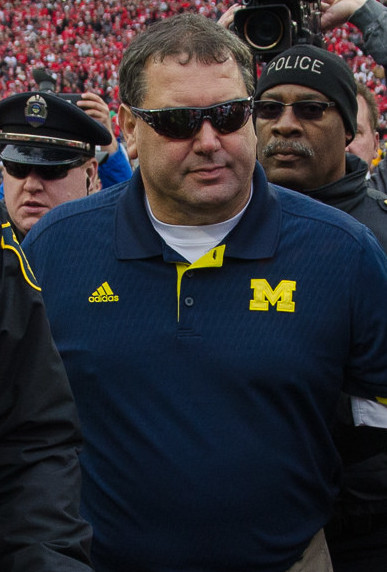
Coach Hoke

On January 11, 2011, Michigan announced the hiring of new head coach Brady Hoke. He became the 19th head coach in Michigan football history. Hoke had previously been the head coach at his alma mater Ball State and then San Diego State after serving as an assistant at Michigan under Lloyd Carr from 1995 to 2002. In his first season, Hoke led the Wolverines to 11 wins, beating rival Notre Dame with a spectacular comeback in Michigan's first night game at Michigan Stadium. Despite losing to Iowa and Michigan State, the Wolverines finished with a 10–2 regular season record with their first win over Ohio State in eight years. The Wolverines received an invitation to the Sugar Bowl in which they defeated Virginia Tech, 23–20, in overtime. This was the program's first bowl win since the season of 2007.

In Hoke's second season, the Wolverines dropped their season opener to eventual national champions, Alabama in Dallas, Texas. U-M won the next two games at home in non-conference bouts against Air Force and UMass. Michigan then traveled to face eventual national runner-up Notre Dame. They fell to the Fighting Irish by a 13–6 final. After back-to-back wins over Purdue and Illinois, they defeated in-state rival Michigan State for the first time since 2007. The win was the 900th in program history, becoming the first program to reach the milestone. U-M finished the season with wins over Minnesota, Northwestern and Iowa as well as losses to Nebraska and Ohio State to finish the regular season. Michigan was selected to participate in the Outback Bowl, where they fell to South Carolina by a 33–28 score.

In the 2013 campaign, Michigan finished with a 7–6 record, including a 3–5 record in Big Ten play and a loss to Kansas State in the Buffalo Wild Wings Bowl 31–14. On December 2, 2014, Hoke was fired as the head coach after four seasons following a 5–7 record in 2014. This marked only the third season since 1975 in which Michigan missed a bowl game. Hoke compiled a 31–20 record, including an 18–14 record in Big Ten play.

=== Harbaugh years (2015–2023) ===
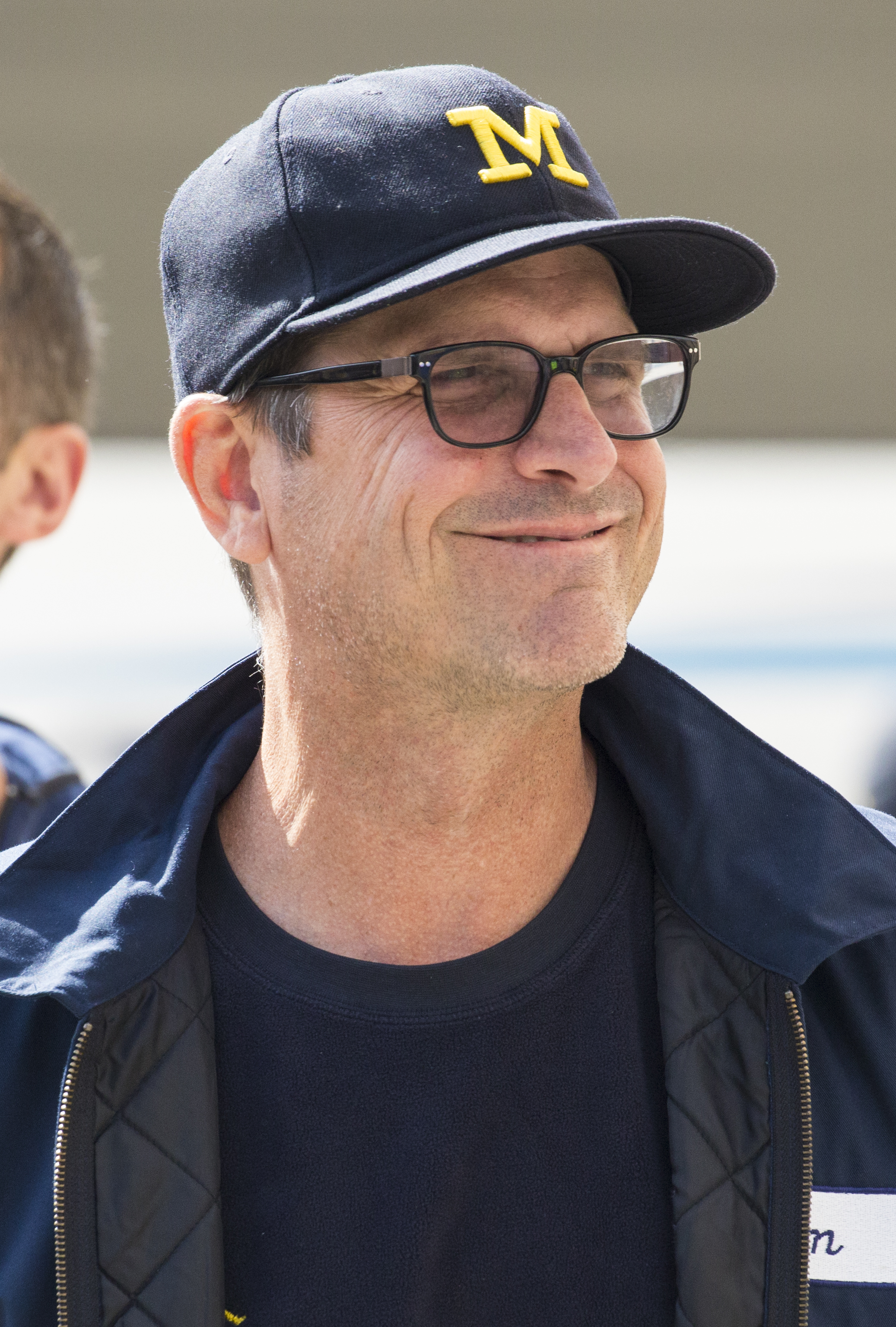
Coach Harbaugh

On December 30, 2014, the University of Michigan announced the hiring of Jim Harbaugh as the team's 20th head coach. Harbaugh, who was a starting quarterback for the Wolverines in the mid-1980s under Bo Schembechler, had most recently served as head coach of the NFL's San Francisco 49ers. He also led an impressive turnaround of the Stanford Cardinal football program as the head coach. Harbaugh signed a seven-year contract worth seven million dollars annually, excluding incentives. In his first season in 2015, Harbaugh led Michigan to a 10–3 record, including a 41–7 win over the Florida Gators in the 2016 Citrus Bowl.

The 2016 Wolverines won their first nine games of the season, including wins over No. 8 ranked Wisconsin and rival Michigan State, and reached No. 2 in the College Football Playoff rankings. The team then lost at Iowa and again at Ohio State two weeks later. The season ended with a 33–32 loss to Florida State in the Orange Bowl on December 30, resulting in a second straight 10–3 record. Jabrill Peppers, who played linebacker and defensive back as well as special teams and offense, was a finalist for the Heisman Trophy, finishing fifth.

In 2017, the team lost many key players on the offensive and defensive side of the ball prior to Harbaugh's third season. The Wolverines went 8–4 in the regular season losing to their main rivals, Michigan State and Ohio State. They also lost to South Carolina in the Outback Bowl, becoming the only team in the Big Ten Conference to lose its bowl game in the 2017–2018 bowl season, finishing the year 8–5.

Harbaugh's fourth season in 2018 started with a loss to rival Notre Dame, followed by ten consecutive wins. Wins over ranked Big Ten opponents Michigan State, Wisconsin, and Penn State, all of whom beat Michigan the previous year, led to the team rallying and referring to the season as a "revenge tour." The Wolverines rose to No. 4 in the College Football Playoff rankings, but were upset by rival Ohio State by a score of 62–39 to end the regular season. Ohio State's 62 points set a record for the most points scored against Michigan in regulation. A blowout loss to Florida in the Peach Bowl ended the season, as they finished at 10–3 for the third time in Harbaugh's four years.

During Harbaugh's fifth season in 2019, the Wolverines lost to Wisconsin 35–14 and to Penn State 28–21, both on the road. Michigan went on to beat rivals Notre Dame 45–14 and Michigan State 44–10, but once again lost to No. 1 ranked Ohio State by a score of 56–27 to end the regular season. Michigan later lost to Alabama 16–35 in the Citrus Bowl, ending the season with a record of 9–4.

For the 2020 season, COVID-19 precautions delayed the start of Big Ten play. The Wolverines started with a dominating 49–24 win against Minnesota. However, in a highly physical game against Michigan State, the Wolverines incurred many player injuries and narrowly lost 27–24. The next week, Michigan lost to Indiana 38–21. Michigan had beaten Indiana in the previous 24 matchups, not having lost to the Hoosiers since the 1987 season. Michigan hosted Wisconsin and suffered its largest halftime deficit at home since Michigan Stadium opened in 1927 (28–0), as well as its largest home loss (49–11) since 1935. It was also Harbaugh's first loss at Michigan Stadium to a team other than Michigan State or Ohio State. Michigan hosted Penn State and for the first time in Michigan football history lost to a team that was 0–5 or worse. Michigan was winless at home during the 2020 season, marking the first time in program history that they did not win any games at home. The final three scheduled games of the season, against Maryland, Ohio State and Iowa were canceled due to COVID-19 concerns. Michigan did not play in a postseason bowl game for the first time under Harbaugh. On January 8, 2021, the Michigan administration and Jim Harbaugh agreed to a contract extension with a pay-cut through 2025.

The Wolverines started the 2021 season unranked, but quickly surged into the rankings. They won their first seven games, which included blowout wins against Washington and Wisconsin. The team rose to No. 6 in the polls before a top-ten showdown with rival No. 8 ranked Michigan State. Michigan narrowly lost to their instate rival, but rebounded with wins against Indiana, Penn State and Maryland in their subsequent three games, setting up a winner-take-all matchup for the Big Ten East division against arch-rival Ohio State. In a top-five showdown, Michigan used a dominant second half performance to beat Ohio State 42–27, giving the Wolverines their first win against the Buckeyes since 2011, and a berth into their first-ever Big Ten Championship Game. In the Big Ten Championship Game against Big Ten West champions Iowa, the No. 2 ranked Wolverines dominated the Hawkeyes 42–3 to win their first outright Big Ten Championship since 2003. As the second seed in the College Football Playoff, the Wolverines lost the semifinal in the Orange Bowl to the eventual national champion Georgia Bulldogs 34–11, finishing the season 12–2. Michigan was ranked No. 3 in the final AP and Coaches Poll of the season. Defensive end Aidan Hutchinson finished runner-up in voting for the 2021 Heisman Trophy.

In 2022, Michigan began the season ranked No. 8. They won a top-10 showdown against 6-0 No. 10 Penn State 41-17, and beat Michigan State 29–7. The Wolverines defeated 11-0 No. 2 Ohio State 45–23 in Columbus, marking their first win at Ohio Stadium since 2000 and the first time Harbaugh and Michigan beat both Michigan State and Ohio State in the same season. Michigan's perfect 12–0 regular season record earned them their second straight Big Ten East Division championship and an appearance in the Big Ten Championship Game. Michigan would defeat the West Division champions Purdue 43–22, and repeat as conference champions and earn a second consecutive College Football Playoff appearance. In the semifinal Fiesta Bowl, Michigan lost to TCU 51–45, finishing the season 13–1. Michigan's 13 wins set a school record for most wins in a single-season and the team was again ranked third in the final AP and Coaches Poll of the season. This marked the first time since 1947 and 1948 that Michigan finished consecutive seasons ranked in the top three. Running back Blake Corum finished seventh in the voting for the 2022 Heisman Trophy.

The 2023 season started with the university-imposed three-game suspension of Harbaugh for recruiting violations during the COVID-19 dead period. The NCAA also opened an investigation into allegations regarding a Michigan sign-stealing operation against other teams. The ensuing controversy led to the firing of linebackers coach Chris Partridge and the commissioner, Tony Petitti, imposing a suspension of Harbaugh for the final three games of the 2023 regular season. Sherrone Moore took over as acting-head coach and the Wolverines continued to win games, including a road win against top-ten ranked Penn State, a record-setting 1,000th win against Maryland and a third straight victory over rival Ohio State. After completing his suspension, Harbaugh coached Michigan to a 26–0 win over No. 16 Iowa in the 2023 Big Ten Championship Game. Michigan was then ranked No. 1 in both major polls and by the College Football Playoff Committee, securing a playoff berth for the third consecutive season. Harbaugh coached Michigan to a 27–20 overtime victory over No. 4 Alabama in the Rose Bowl, improving their record to 14–0 on the season. Harbaugh then coached Michigan to a 34–13 victory over Washington in the College Football Playoff National Championship, setting a single-season program record with 15 wins and zero losses for the season. On January 24, 2024, Harbaugh accepted an offer to become the head coach of the NFL's Los Angeles Chargers. In his nine-season tenure at Michigan, Harbaugh compiled an 89–25 record, winning three Big Ten championships and one national championship.

=== Moore years (2024–2025) ===
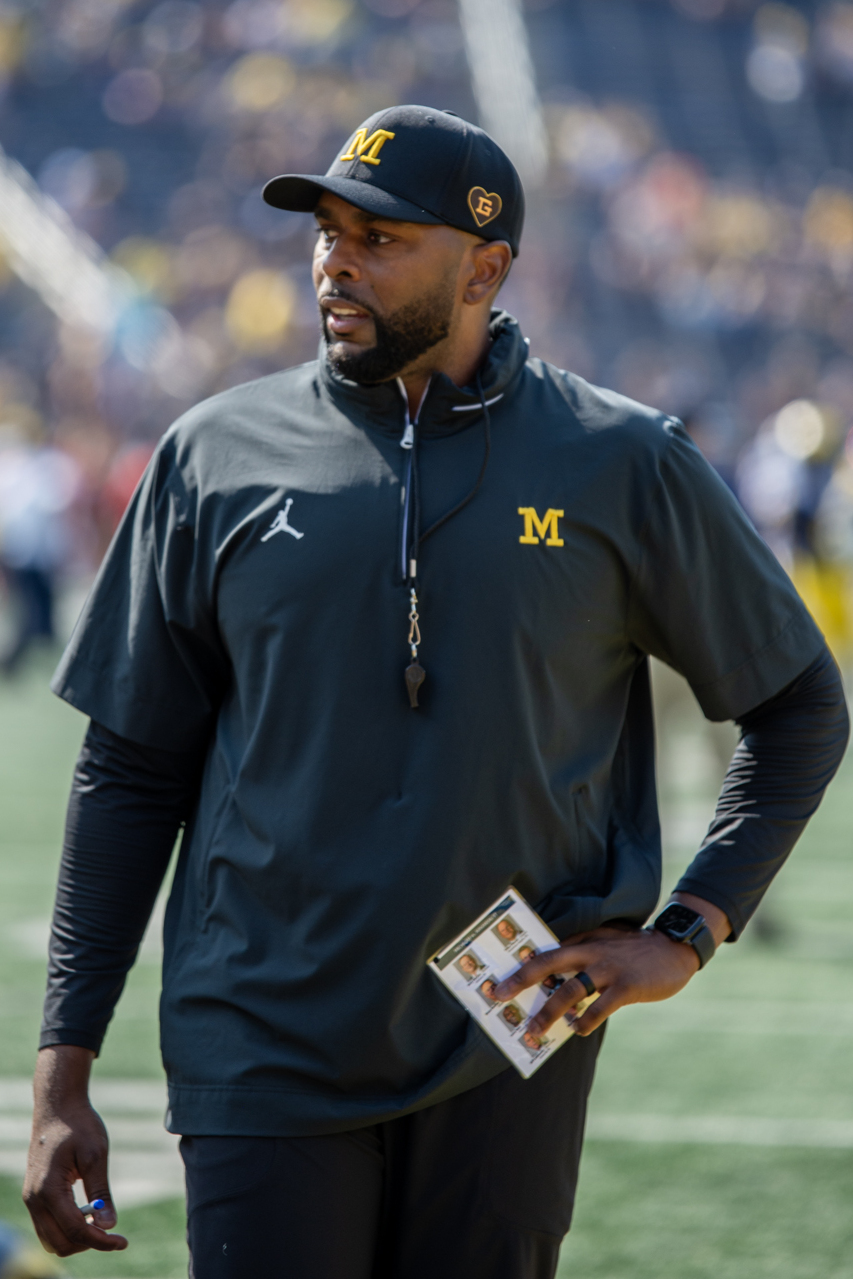
Moore with the Wolverines in 2024

On January 26, 2024, Michigan named Sherrone Moore as its 21st head football coach, making him the first African American to be hired as head coach by the program. In Moore's first season, he led the 2024 Wolverines to an 8–5 record on the year, including wins over Michigan State, Ohio State and Alabama. Moore was the first Michigan head coach since Bennie Oosterbaan in 1948 to defeat Michigan State in his first year. In the regular season finale against the No. 2 ranked Buckeyes, Moore led Michigan to a 13–10 upset victory at Ohio Stadium, despite entering as 20.5 point underdogs. It marked the fourth consecutive victory for Michigan, the longest streak since 1988 to 1991, and the largest upset in the series history. On December 31, 2024, Moore won his first postseason game in the ReliaQuest Bowl, as Michigan defeated No. 11 Alabama, 19–13, after entering as 16.5 point underdogs. Michigan became the only program in college football history to beat Alabama twice in the same calendar year (also winning the 2024 Rose Bowl), and the first team since 1978 to win back-to-back games as double digit underdogs.

In Moore's second season, the 2025 Wolverines finished the regular season with a 9–3 record, 7–2 in the Big Ten to finish in a tie for fourth place. Michigan had early season road losses to No. 18 Oklahoma and USC, before winning five games in a row, including a fourth straight defeat of rival Michigan State. In the final week of the regular season, Michigan was ranked No. 15 with a chance to earn a CFP berth before losing at home to No. 1 Ohio State, 27-9. It was Moore's first loss in the rivalry in his three games as the head coach, and Michigan's first loss to Ohio State since 2019.

On December 10, 2025, Moore was fired after an investigation by the University of Michigan found that he had engaged in an inappropriate relationship with a team staff member.

=== Whittingham years (2026–present) ===
On December 26, 2025, Kyle Whittingham was hired as the 22nd head football coach, agreeing to a five-year deal with the program after 21 seasons as head coach for the Utah Utes.

== Conference affiliations ==
- Independent (1879–1891)
- Intercollegiate Athletic Association of the Northwest (1892–1893)
- Independent (1894–1895)
- Western Conference (1896–1906)
- Independent (1907–1916)
- Big Ten Conference (1917–present)
  - Big Nine Conference (1946–1949)
  - Big Ten Conference (1917–1945, 1950–present)

== Bowl games ==
Michigan has played in 54 bowl games in its history, compiling a record of 24–30. Before missing a bowl game in 2008, Michigan had made a bowl game 33 years in a row. From the 1921 to 1945 seasons, the Big Ten Conference did not allow its teams to participate in bowls. From the 1946 to 1974 seasons, only a conference champion or a surrogate representative was allowed to attend a bowl, the Rose Bowl, and no team could go two years in a row until the 1972 Rose Bowl, with the exception of Minnesota in 1961 and 1962.

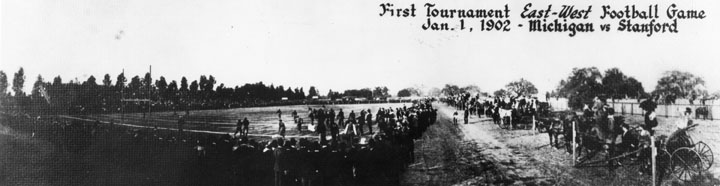
Michigan defeated Stanford 49–0 in the first ever Rose Bowl on January 1, 1902

Date	Bowl	Opponent	Result
January 1, 1902	Rose Bowl	Stanford	W 49–0
January 1, 1948	Rose Bowl	USC	W 49–0
January 1, 1951	Rose Bowl	California	W 14–6
January 1, 1965	Rose Bowl	Oregon State	W 34–7
January 1, 1970	Rose Bowl	USC	L 3–10
January 1, 1972	Rose Bowl	Stanford	L 12–13
January 1, 1976	Orange Bowl	Oklahoma	L 6–14
January 1, 1977	Rose Bowl	USC	L 6–14
January 2, 1978	Rose Bowl	Washington	L 20–27
January 1, 1979	Rose Bowl	USC	L 10–17
December 28, 1979	Gator Bowl	North Carolina	L 15–17
January 1, 1981	Rose Bowl	Washington	W 23–6
December 31, 1981	Bluebonnet Bowl	UCLA	W 33–14
January 1, 1983	Rose Bowl	UCLA	L 14–24
January 2, 1984	Sugar Bowl	Auburn	L 7–9
December 21, 1984	Holiday Bowl	BYU	L 17–24
January 1, 1986	Fiesta Bowl	Nebraska	W 27–23
January 1, 1987	Rose Bowl	Arizona State	L 15–22
January 2, 1988	Hall of Fame Bowl	Alabama	W 28–24
January 2, 1989	Rose Bowl	USC	W 22–14
January 1, 1990	Rose Bowl	USC	L 10–17
January 1, 1991	Gator Bowl	Ole Miss	W 35–3
January 1, 1992	Rose Bowl	Washington	L 14–34
January 1, 1993	Rose Bowl	Washington	W 38–31
January 1, 1994	Hall of Fame Bowl	NC State	W 42–7
December 30, 1994	Holiday Bowl	Colorado State	W 24–14
December 28, 1995	Alamo Bowl	Texas A&M	L 20–22
January 1, 1997	Outback Bowl	Alabama	L 14–17
January 1, 1998	Rose Bowl	Washington State	W 21–16
January 1, 1999	Citrus Bowl	Arkansas	W 45–31
January 1, 2000	Orange Bowl	Alabama	W 35–34 ^{(OT)}
January 1, 2001	Citrus Bowl	Auburn	W 31–28
January 1, 2002	Citrus Bowl	Tennessee	L 17–45
January 1, 2003	Outback Bowl	Florida	W 38–30
January 1, 2004	Rose Bowl	USC	L 14–28
January 1, 2005	Rose Bowl	Texas	L 37–38
December 28, 2005	Alamo Bowl	Nebraska	L 28–32
January 1, 2007	Rose Bowl	USC	L 18–32
January 1, 2008	Capital One Bowl	Florida	W 41–35
January 1, 2011	Gator Bowl	Mississippi State	L 14–52
January 3, 2012	Sugar Bowl	Virginia Tech	W 23–20 ^{OT}
January 1, 2013	Outback Bowl	South Carolina	L 28–33
December 28, 2013	Buffalo Wild Wings Bowl	Kansas State	L 14–31
January 1, 2016	Citrus Bowl	Florida	W 41–7
December 30, 2016	Orange Bowl †	Florida State	L 32–33
January 1, 2018	Outback Bowl	South Carolina	L 19–26
December 29, 2018	Peach Bowl †	Florida	L 15–41
January 1, 2020	Citrus Bowl	Alabama	L 16–35
December 31, 2021	Orange Bowl (CFP Semifinal) †	Georgia	L 11–34
December 31, 2022	Fiesta Bowl (CFP Semifinal) †	TCU	L 45–51
January 1, 2024	Rose Bowl (CFP Semifinal) †	Alabama	W 27–20^{OT}
January 8, 2024	CFP National Championship	Washington	W 34–13
December 31, 2024	ReliaQuest Bowl	Alabama	W 19–13
December 31, 2025	Citrus Bowl	Texas	L 27–41
Total	54 bowl games	24–30	1,264–1,209

† New Year's Six bowl game

Bowl record by game

Bowl	#	W	L	%
Alamo Bowl	2	0	2	.000
Bluebonnet Bowl	1	1	0	1.000
Buffalo Wild Wings Bowl	1	0	1	.000
Citrus Bowl (Capital One Bowl)	7	4	3	.571
CFP National Championship Game	1	1	0	1.000
Fiesta Bowl	2	1	1	.500
Gator Bowl	3	1	2	.333
Holiday Bowl	2	1	1	.500
Orange Bowl	4	1	3	.250
Peach Bowl	1	0	1	.000
ReliaQuest Bowl (Hall of Fame/Outback Bowl)	7	4	3	.571
Rose Bowl	21	9	12	.428
Sugar Bowl	2	1	1	.500

== Venues ==
=== Washtenaw County Fairgrounds (1883–1892) ===
In the early days of Michigan football, Michigan played smaller home games at the Washtenaw County Fairgrounds with larger games being held in Detroit at the Detroit Athletic Club. The Fairgrounds were originally located at the southeast intersection of Hill and Forest, but in 1890 moved to what is now called Burns Park.

=== Regents Field (1893–1905) ===
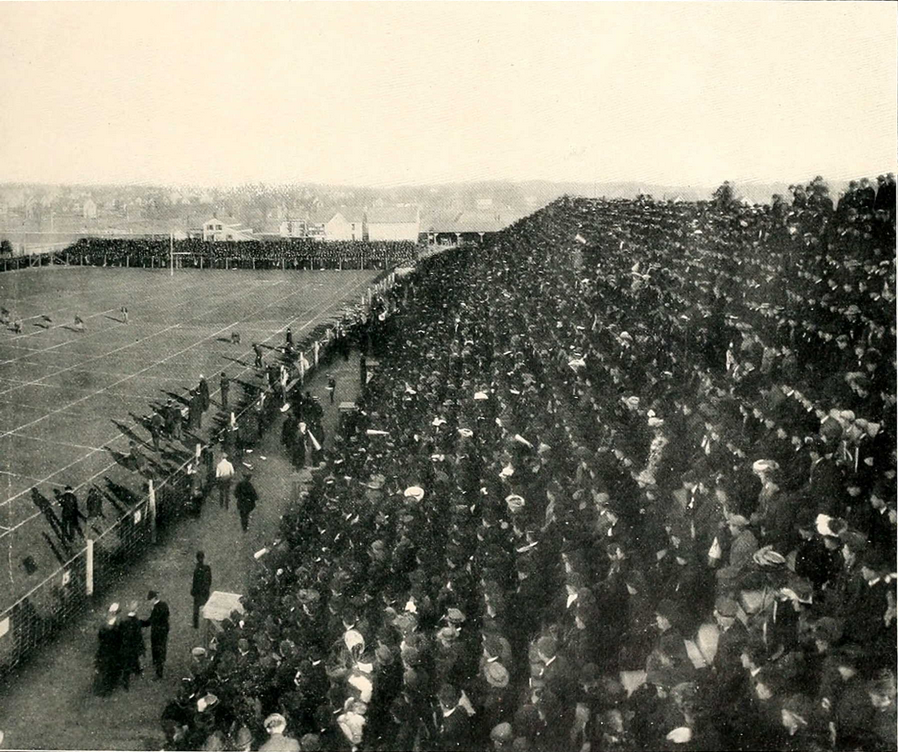
Regents Field just before kickoff during the 1904 game between Michigan and Chicago

In 1890, the Board of Regents authorized $3,000 ($78,947.37 in 2014 dollars) for the purchase of a parcel of land along South State Street. In 1891 a further $4,500 ($118,421.05 in 2014 dollars) was authorized "for the purpose of fitting up the athletic field." Michigan began play on Regents Field in 1893, with capacity being expanded to over 15,000 by the end of the field's use.

=== Ferry Field (1906–1926) ===
By 1902 Regents Field had grown inadequate for the uses of the football team as a result of the sport's increasing popularity. Thanks to donations from Dexter M. Ferry, work began on planning the next home stadium for the Michigan football team. Powered by a $30,000 donation from Ferry, Ferry Field was constructed with a maximum temporary capacity of 18,000 for the 1906 season. Ferry Field was expanded to a capacity of 21,000 in 1914 and 42,000 in 1921. However, attendance was often over-capacity with crowds of 48,000 cramming into the small stadium. This prompted athletic director Fielding Yost to contemplate the construction of a much larger stadium.

=== Michigan Stadium (1927–present) ===
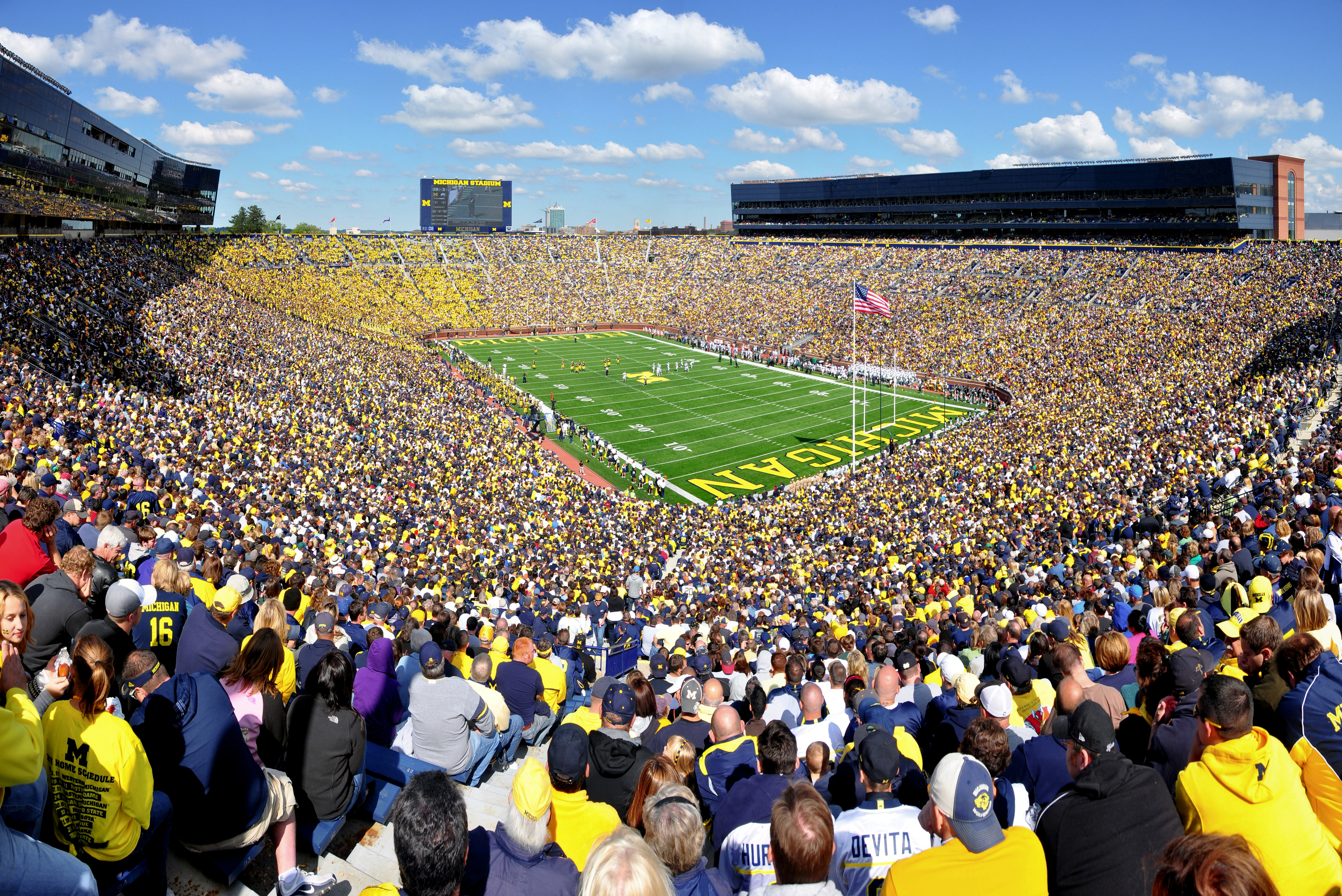
Michigan Stadium on September 17, 2011

Fielding H. Yost anticipated massive crowds as college football's popularity increased and wished to build a stadium with a capacity of at least 80,000. Ultimately, the final plans authorized the construction of a stadium with a capacity of 72,000 with footings to be set in place to expand it beyond 100,000 later. Michigan Stadium was dedicated in 1927 during a game against the Ohio State Buckeyes, drawing an over-capacity crowd of 84,401. After World War II, crowd sizes increased, prompting another stadium expansion to a capacity of 93,894 in 1949. Michigan Stadium cracked the 100,000 mark by expanding to 101,001 in 1955. Michigan Stadium temporarily lost the title of "largest stadium" to Neyland Stadium of the Tennessee Volunteers in 1996, but recaptured the title in 1998 with another expansion to 107,501. In 2007, the Board of Regents authorized a $226 million renovation to add a new press box, 83 luxury boxes, and 3,200 club seats. For the 2011 season, lights were installed at Michigan Stadium at the cost of $1.8 million. This allowed Michigan to play its first night game at home against Notre Dame in 2011. Michigan Stadium underwent a renovation for the 2023–2024 season, installing new screens and LED stadium lighting with color-changing fixtures.

== Rivalries ==
=== Ohio State ===
Michigan and Ohio State is an arch-rivalry, first played in 1897. The rivalry was particularly enhanced during The Ten Year War, a period in which Ohio State was coached by Woody Hayes and Michigan was coached by Bo Schembechler. In 2000, the game was ranked by ESPN as the greatest North American sports rivalry ever. Overall, the Buckeyes and Wolverines football programs have combined for 20 national titles, 84 conference titles, and 10 Heisman Trophy winners. Michigan holds a 62–52–6 advantage in the all-time series, last playing in 2025 and losing for the first time since 2019.

=== Michigan State ===
Michigan and Michigan State first played each other in 1898. Since Michigan State joined the Big Ten Conference in 1953, the two schools have competed annually for the Paul Bunyan Trophy, with the winner retaining possession of the trophy until the next year's game. Michigan leads the trophy series 42–30–2. The Spartans currently hold the trophy after winning at Michigan Stadium 15-6 in 2026. Michigan holds a 75–39–5 advantage in the all-time series.

=== Minnesota ===
Michigan first played Minnesota in 1892, and play for the Little Brown Jug trophy. The Little Brown Jug is the most regularly exchanged rivalry trophy in college football and the oldest trophy game in FBS college football. Michigan leads the overall series, 78–26–3, last playing in 2026 with Minnesota possessing the jug for the first time since 2014.

=== Notre Dame ===
Michigan and Notre Dame began playing each other in 1887 in Notre Dame's first football game. The rivalry is notable due to the historical success of the football programs, as Michigan and Notre Dame both claim 12 national championships each. Michigan and Notre Dame have played in 42 contests, with Michigan leading 25–17–1. The two teams last played in 2019, with the Wolverines defeating the Fighting Irish 45–14.

=== Northwestern ===
Michigan and Northwestern first played each other in 1892. In 2021, the two universities announced the creation of a new rivalry trophy to be awarded to the game's winner, the George Jewett Trophy. The trophy honors George Jewett, the first African American player in Big Ten Conference history, having played for both schools. The game is the first FBS rivalry game named for an African American player. Since the inception of the trophy, the Wolverines hold a 3–0 advantage. Michigan leads 61–15–2 in the all-time series, last playing in 2025.

=== Illinois ===
The rivalry between Illinois is one of Michigan's more historic, with the two schools having first played in 1898 and playing 73 consecutive years from 1924 to 1996. Michigan leads the all-time series, 72–24–2. The teams last played in 2024, with the Fighting Illini defeating the Wolverines 21-7 in Champaign; that university's first win versus Michigan since 2009.

=== Penn State ===
Michigan's rivalry with Penn State is their newest, with the two schools having never played each other before the Nittany Lions joined the Big Ten in 1993. Many of the games have had Big Ten championship implications, with the two teams playing each season in the Big Ten east division, before the conference divisions were dissolved in 2024. Michigan leads the all-time series, 18–10. The two teams met most recently in 2026, with Michigan going on to win, 21-18, at home.

== Championships ==
=== National championships ===
Michigan has been selected 19 times as national champions by NCAA-designated major selectors, including three (1948, 1997, 2023) by the major wire services (AP Poll and Coaches' Poll). Michigan claims 12 (1901, 1902, 1903, 1904, 1918, 1923, 1932, 1933, 1947, 1948, 1997, and 2023) of these championships. Before 1926, there were generally no contemporaneous selectors; most selectors emerged in the ensuing decades and named past champions retroactively.

Year	Coach	Selector	Record	Bowl	Final AP	Final Coaches
1901	Fielding H. Yost	Billingsley, Helms, Houlgate, NCF	11–0	Won Rose		
1902	Fielding H. Yost	Billingsley, Helms, Houlgate, NCF, Parke Davis	11–0			
1903	Fielding H. Yost	Billingsley, NCF	11–0–1			
1904	Fielding H. Yost	Billingsley, NCF	10–0			
1918	Fielding H. Yost	Billingsley, NCF	5–0			
1923	Fielding H. Yost	Billingsley, NCF	8–0			
1932	Harry G. Kipke	Dickinson, Parke Davis	8–0			
1933	Harry G. Kipke	Berryman (QPRS), Billingsley, Boand, CFRA, Dickinson, Helms, Houlgate, NCF, Parke Davis, Poling, Sagarin	7–0–1			
1947	Fritz Crisler	Berryman (QPRS), Billingsley, Boand, CFRA, DeVold, Dunkel, Helms, Houlgate, Litkenhous, NCF, Poling, Sagarin, Special post-bowl Associated Press poll (Note: Not an NCAA-designated major selector.)	10–0	Won Rose	No. 2	
1948	Bennie Oosterbaan	AP, Berryman (QPRS), Billingsley, CFRA, DeVold, Dunkel, Helms, Houlgate, Litkenhous, NCF, Poling, Sagarin, Williamson	9–0		No. 1	
1997	Lloyd Carr	AP, Billingsley, FWAA, NCF, NFF, Sporting News	12–0	Won Rose	No. 1	No. 2
2023	Jim Harbaugh	AP, CCR, College Football Playoff, CFRA, CM, NFF, MCFR, SR, USAT(Coaches Poll)	15–0	Won Rose (CFP Semifinal); Won CFP National Championship Game	No. 1	No. 1

Michigan has also been selected an additional seven times by various NCAA-designated "major selectors", in 1910, 1925, 1926, 1964, 1973, 1976, and 1985.

=== Conference championships ===
Michigan has won 45 conference championships, 19 outright and 26 shared.

Year	Coach	Overall record	Big Ten record
1898	Gustave Ferbert	10–0	3–0
1901†	Fielding H. Yost	11–0	4–0
1902	Fielding H. Yost	11–0	5–0
1903†	Fielding H. Yost	11–0–1	3–0–1
1904†	Fielding H. Yost	10–0	2–0
1906†	Fielding H. Yost	4–1	1–0
1918†	Fielding H. Yost	5–0	2–0
1922†	Fielding H. Yost	6–0–1	4–0
1923†	Fielding H. Yost	8–0	4–0
1925	Fielding H. Yost	7–1	5–1
1926†	Fielding H. Yost	7–1	5–0
1930†	Harry Kipke	8–0–1	5–0
1931†	Harry Kipke	8–1–1	5–1
1932†	Harry Kipke	8–0	6–0
1933†	Harry Kipke	7–0–1	5–0–1
1943†	Fritz Crisler	8–1	6–0
1947	Fritz Crisler	10–0	6–0
1948	Bennie Oosterbaan	9–0	6–0
1949†	Bennie Oosterbaan	6–2–1	4–1–1
1950	Bennie Oosterbaan	6–3–1	4–1–1
1964	Bump Elliott	9–1	6–1
1969†	Bo Schembechler	8–3	6–1
1971	Bo Schembechler	11–1	8–0
1972†	Bo Schembechler	10–1	7–1
1973†	Bo Schembechler	10–0–1	7–0–1
1974†	Bo Schembechler	10–1	7–1
1976†	Bo Schembechler	10–2	7–1
1977†	Bo Schembechler	10–2	7–1
1978†	Bo Schembechler	10–2	7–1
1980	Bo Schembechler	10–2	8–0
1982	Bo Schembechler	8–4	8–1
1986†	Bo Schembechler	11–2	7–1
1988	Bo Schembechler	9–2–1	7–0–1
1989	Bo Schembechler	10–2	8–0
1990†	Gary Moeller	9–3	6–2
1991	Gary Moeller	10–2	8–0
1992	Gary Moeller	9–0–3	6–0–2
1997	Lloyd Carr	12–0	8–0
1998†	Lloyd Carr	10–3	7–1
2000†	Lloyd Carr	9–3	6–2
2003	Lloyd Carr	10–3	7–1
2004†	Lloyd Carr	9–3	7–1
2021	Jim Harbaugh	12–2	8–1
2022	Jim Harbaugh	13–1	9–0
2023	Jim Harbaugh	15–0	9–0

† Co-champions

=== Division championships ===
Michigan has won four division titles.

Year	Division	Coach	Opponent	CG result
2018†	Big Ten – East	Jim Harbaugh	N/A; lost tiebreaker to Ohio State	
2021†	Big Ten – East	Jim Harbaugh	Iowa	W 42–3
2022	Big Ten – East	Jim Harbaugh	Purdue	W 43–22
2023	Big Ten – East	Jim Harbaugh	Iowa	W 26–0

† Co-champions

== Program records and achievements ==
=== Team records ===
- Most wins in college football history (1,027)
- Most winning seasons of any program (123)
- Most undefeated seasons of any program currently competing in Division I FBS (24)
- Most appearances in the final AP Poll (62)
- More conference titles in the Big Ten than any other program with a single conference (45)
- First team in college or professional football to win 1,000 games (defeated Maryland on November 18, 2023)

== Head coaching history and current staff ==
=== Current coaching staff ===
Michigan Wolverines
Name	Position	Consecutive full season(s) at Michigan in current position	Previous position
Kyle Whittingham	Head coach	1st	Utah – Head coach (2005–2025)
Jim Harding	Assistant head coach / interim offensive coordinator / offensive line	1st	Utah – Assistant head coach / offensive line (2014–2025)
Jay Hill	Defensive coordinator	1st	BYU – Associate head coach / defensive coordinator / safeties (2023–2025)
Kerry Coombs	Special teams coordinator	1st	Cincinnati – Special teams coordinator / cornerbacks (2022–2024)
Tony Alford	Running backs	3rd	Ohio State – Assistant head coach / running backs (2015–2023)
Freddie Whittingham	Tight ends	1st	Utah – Tight ends (2016–2025)
Micah Simon	Wide receivers	1st	Utah – Wide receivers (2025)
Koy Detmer Jr.	Quarterbacks	1st	Utah – Assistant quarterbacks (2025)
Jernaro Gilford	Cornerbacks	1st	BYU – Cornerbacks (2016–2025)
Lewis Powell	Defensive ends	1st	Utah – Defensive ends (2019–2025)
Larry Black	Defensive tackles	1st	Vanderbilt – Defensive line (2022–2025)
Alex Whittingham	Linebackers	1st	Kansas City Chiefs – Defensive assistant (2018–2025)
Tyler Stockton	Safeties	1st	Boise State – Co-defensive coordinator / safeties (2024–2025)
Doug Elisaia	Director of strength and conditioning	1st	Utah – Director of strength and conditioning (2006–2025)

== Individual awards and honors ==
=== National award winners ===
==== Players ====
- Heisman Trophy

1940: Tom Harmon
1991: Desmond Howard
1997: Charles Woodson

- Maxwell Award

1940: Tom Harmon
1991: Desmond Howard

- Walter Camp Award

1991: Desmond Howard
1997: Charles Woodson

- Chic Harley Award

1964: Bob Timberlake
1986: Jim Harbaugh
1991: Desmond Howard
1997: Charles Woodson

- Dick Butkus Award

1991: Erick Anderson

- Jack Lambert Trophy

1991: Erick Anderson

- Paul Warfield Trophy

1991: Desmond Howard
2004: Braylon Edwards

- Jim Parker Trophy

1991: Greg Skrepenak
2000: Steve Hutchinson
2007: Jake Long

- Sammy Baugh Trophy

1992: Elvis Grbac

- Jack Tatum Trophy

1997: Charles Woodson

- Jim Thorpe Award

1997: Charles Woodson

- Chuck Bednarik Award

1997: Charles Woodson

- Bronko Nagurski Trophy

1997: Charles Woodson

- Doak Walker Award

2003: Chris Perry

- Jim Brown Trophy

2003: Chris Perry

- Fred Biletnikoff Award

2004: Braylon Edwards

- Rimington Trophy

2004: David Baas
2011: David Molk
2022: Olusegun Oluwatimi

- Lombardi Award

2006: LaMarr Woodley
2021: Aidan Hutchinson

- Ted Hendricks Award

2006: LaMarr Woodley
2021: Aidan Hutchinson

- Ozzie Newsome Award

2015: Jake Butt

- John Mackey Award

2016: Jake Butt

- Lott IMPACT Trophy

2016: Jabrill Peppers
2021: Aidan Hutchinson
2023: Junior Colson

- Paul Hornung Award

2016: Jabrill Peppers

- Lou Groza Award

2021: Jake Moody

- Joe Moore Award

2021: Offensive line
2022: Offensive line

- Outland Trophy

2022: Olusegun Oluwatimi

==== Coaches ====
- AFCA Coach of the Year

1947: Fritz Crisler
1948: Bennie Oosterbaan
1969: Bo Schembechler
1997: Lloyd Carr

- Paul "Bear" Bryant Award

1997: Lloyd Carr

- Eddie Robinson Coach of the Year

1969: Bo Schembechler

- Walter Camp Coach of the Year Award

1969: Bo Schembechler
1997: Lloyd Carr

- Bobby Dodd Coach of the Year Award

1977: Bo Schembechler
2007: Lloyd Carr

- Associated Press Coach of the Year

2021: Jim Harbaugh

- Sporting News Coach of the Year

1985: Bo Schembechler

- Woody Hayes Trophy

1985: Bo Schembechler
1997: Lloyd Carr

- George Munger Award

1989: Bo Schembechler
1997: Lloyd Carr
2011: Brady Hoke

- Broyles Award

1997: Jim Herrmann
2021: Josh Gattis

- AFCA Assistant Coach of the Year

2001: Fred Jackson

=== Heisman Trophy voting ===
Twenty-nine Heisman Trophy candidates have played at Michigan. Three have won the award:

- 1939: Tom Harmon, 2nd
- 1940: Tom Harmon, 1st
- 1941: Bob Westfall, 8th
- 1943: Bill Daley, 7th
- 1947: Bob Chappuis, 2nd
- 1955: Ron Kramer, 8th
- 1956: Ron Kramer, 6th
- 1964: Bob Timberlake, 4th
- 1968: Ron Johnson, 6th
- 1974: Dennis Franklin, 8th
- 1975: Gordon Bell, 8th
- 1976: Rob Lytle, 3rd
- 1977: Rick Leach, 8th
- 1978: Rick Leach, 3rd
- 1980: Anthony Carter, 10th
- 1981: Anthony Carter, 7th
- 1982: Anthony Carter, 4th
- 1986: Jim Harbaugh, 3rd
- 1991: Desmond Howard, 1st
- 1993: Tyrone Wheatley, 8th
- 1994: Tyrone Wheatley, 12th
- 1995: Tim Biakabutuka, 8th
- 1997: Charles Woodson, 1st
- 2003: Chris Perry, 4th
- 2004: Braylon Edwards, 10th
- 2006: Mike Hart, 5th
- 2010: Denard Robinson, 6th
- 2016: Jabrill Peppers, 5th
- 2021: Aidan Hutchinson, 2nd
- 2022: Blake Corum, 7th
- 2023: Blake Corum, 9th
- 2023: J. J. McCarthy, 10th

=== Team and conference MVP ===
Michigan Most Valuable Player Award (1926–1959), Louis B. Hyde Memorial Award (1960–1994), Bo Schembechler Award (1995–present); winners of the Chicago Tribune Silver Football as the Big Ten's MVP also noted:

- 1926: Benny Friedman (also Big Ten MVP)
- 1927: Bennie Oosterbaan
- 1928: Otto Pommerening
- 1929: James Simrall
- 1930: Jack Wheeler
- 1931: Bill Hewitt
- 1932: Harry Newman (also Big Ten MVP)
- 1933: Herman Everhardus
- 1934: Gerald Ford
- 1935: William Renner
- 1936: Matt Patanelli
- 1937: Ralph Heikkinen
- 1938: Ralph Heikkinen
- 1939: Tom Harmon
- 1940: Tom Harmon (also Big Ten MVP)
- 1941: Reuben Kelto
- 1942: Albert Wistert
- 1943: Bob Wiese
- 1944: Don Lund
- 1945: Harold Watts
- 1946: Bob Chappuis
- 1947: Bump Elliott (also Big Ten MVP)
- 1948: Dominic Tomasi
- 1949: Dick Kempthorn
- 1950: Don Dufek
- 1951: Don Peterson
- 1952: Ted Topor
- 1953: Tony Branoff
- 1954: Fred Baer
- 1955: Terry Barr
- 1956: Dick Hill
- 1957: Jim Pace (also Big Ten MVP)
- 1958: Bob Ptacek
- 1959: Tony Rio
- 1960: Dennis Fitzgerald
- 1961: John Walker
- 1962: Dave Raimey
- 1963: Tom Keating
- 1964: Bob Timberlake (also Big Ten MVP)
- 1965: Bill Yearby
- 1966: Jack Clancy
- 1967: Ron Johnson
- 1968: Ron Johnson (also Big Ten MVP)
- 1969: Jim Mandich
- 1970: Henry Hill and Don Moorhead
- 1971: Billy Taylor
- 1972: Randy Logan
- 1973: Paul Seal
- 1974: Steve Strinko
- 1975: Gordon Bell
- 1976: Rob Lytle (also Big Ten MVP)
- 1977: Russell Davis
- 1978: Rick Leach (also Big Ten MVP)
- 1979: Ron Simpkins
- 1980: Anthony Carter
- 1981: Butch Woolfolk
- 1982: Anthony Carter (also Big Ten MVP)
- 1983: Steve Smith
- 1984: Mike Mallory
- 1985: Mike Hammerstein
- 1986: Jim Harbaugh (also Big Ten MVP)
- 1987: Jamie Morris
- 1988: Mark Messner
- 1989: Tony Boles
- 1990: Tripp Welborne
- 1991: Desmond Howard (also Big Ten MVP)
- 1992: Chris Hutchinson
- 1993: Buster Stanley
- 1994: Todd Collins
- 1995: Tim Biakabutuka
- 1996: Rod Payne
- 1997: Charles Woodson (also Big Ten MVP)
- 1998: Tai Streets
- 1999: Tom Brady
- 2000: Anthony Thomas
- 2001: Marquise Walker
- 2002: B. J. Askew
- 2003: Chris Perry (also Big Ten MVP)
- 2004: Braylon Edwards (also Big Ten MVP)
- 2005: Jason Avant
- 2006: David Harris and Mike Hart
- 2007: Mike Hart
- 2008: Brandon Graham
- 2009: Brandon Graham (also Big Ten MVP)
- 2010: Denard Robinson (also Big Ten MVP)
- 2011: Denard Robinson
- 2012: Jordan Kovacs
- 2013: Jeremy Gallon
- 2014: Jake Ryan
- 2015: Jehu Chesson
- 2016: Jabrill Peppers
- 2017: Maurice Hurst Jr.
- 2018: Chase Winovich
- 2019: Shea Patterson
- 2020: No award presented
- 2021: Aidan Hutchinson (also Big Ten MVP)
- 2022: Blake Corum (also Big Ten MVP)
- 2023: J. J. McCarthy
- 2024: Mason Graham and Kalel Mullings
- 2025: Derrick Moore

=== Big Ten Conference honors ===
- Player of the Year

1982: Anthony Carter
1986: Jim Harbaugh

- Graham–George Offensive Player of the Year

1990: Jon Vaughn (coaches)
1991: Desmond Howard
1992: Tyrone Wheatley
2003: Chris Perry
2004: Braylon Edwards
2010: Denard Robinson

- Griese–Brees Quarterback of the Year

2023: J. J. McCarthy

- Ameche–Dayne Running Back of the Year

2022: Blake Corum
2023: Blake Corum

- Rimington–Pace Offensive Lineman of the Year

1991: Greg Skrepenak
1998: Jon Jansen
2000: Steve Hutchinson
2004: David Baas
2006: Jake Long
2007: Jake Long
2011: David Molk
2012: Taylor Lewan
2013: Taylor Lewan

- Kwalick–Clark Tight End of the Year

2013: Devin Funchess
2015: Jake Butt
2016: Jake Butt

- Nagurski–Woodson Defensive Player of the Year

1997: Charles Woodson
2001: Larry Foote
2006: LaMarr Woodley
2016: Jabrill Peppers
2018: Devin Bush
2021: Aidan Hutchinson

- Smith–Brown Defensive Lineman of the Year

1985: Mike Hammerstein
1988: Mark Messner
1992: Chris Hutchinson
2006: LaMarr Woodley
2021: Aidan Hutchinson
2022: Mike Morris

- Thompson–Randle El Freshman of the Year

1995: Charles Woodson (coaches)
1997: Anthony Thomas (coaches and media)
2003: Steve Breaston (coaches)
2004: Mike Hart (coaches and media)
2015: Jabrill Peppers (coaches and media)

- Dave McClain / Hayes–Schembechler Coach of the Year

1972: Bo Schembechler (media)
1976: Bo Schembechler (media)
1980: Bo Schembechler (media)
1982: Bo Schembechler (coaches)
1985: Bo Schembechler (media and coaches)
1989: Bo Schembechler (coaches)
1991: Gary Moeller (media and coaches)
1992: Gary Moeller (media)
2011: Brady Hoke (media and coaches)
2022: Jim Harbaugh (media and coaches)

- Tatum–Woodson Defensive Back of the Year

2016: Jourdan Lewis

- Butkus–Fitzgerald Linebacker of the Year

2016: Jabrill Peppers
2018: Devin Bush

- Bakken–Andersen Kicker of the Year

2021: Jake Moody
2022: Jake Moody
2024: Dominic Zvada

- Eddleman–Fields Punter of the Year

2012: Will Hagerup
2018: Will Hart

- Rodgers–Dwight Return Specialist of the Year

2016: Jabrill Peppers

=== Retired numbers ===
The following jersey numbers have been retired by the program:

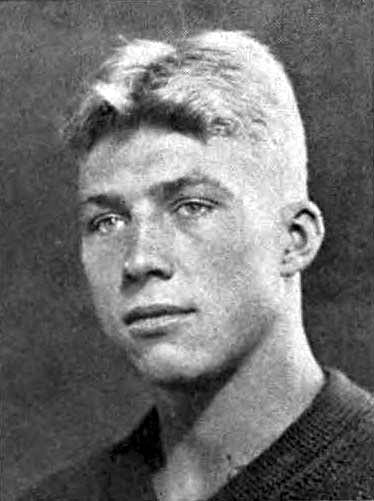
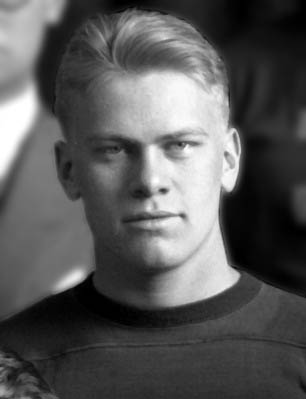
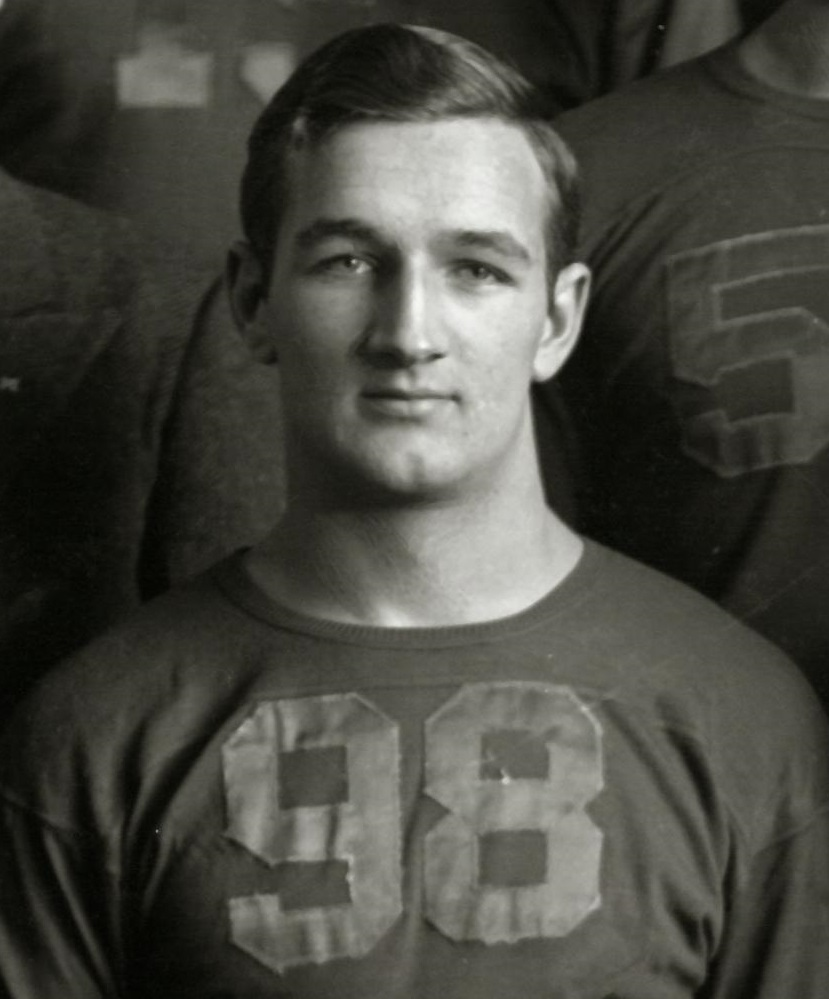
from left to right: Francis Wistert, Gerald Ford, and Tom Harmon, some of the players who have had their numbers retired by Michigan

Michigan Wolverines retired numbers
No.	Player	Pos.	Tenure	No. ret.
11	Francis Wistert	T	1931–1933	1949
11	Albert Wistert	T	1940–1942	1949
11	Alvin Wistert	T	1947–1949	1949
21	Desmond Howard	WR	1989–1991	2015
47	Bennie Oosterbaan	E	1925–1927	1927
48	Gerald Ford	C	1932–1934	1994
87	Ron Kramer	E	1954–1956	1956
98	Tom Harmon	HB	1938–1940	1940

Beginning in 2011, previously retired numbers of "Michigan Football Legends" were assigned to and worn by players selected by the head coach. The Legends program was discontinued in July 2015, and the numbers again permanently retired.

=== Hall of Fame inductees ===
==== College Football Hall of Fame ====
Michigan inductees into the College Football Hall of Fame as of 2024.

= Inducted primarily due to contributions at different university

Name	Position	Inducted
Albert Benbrook	G	1971
Dave Brown	S	2007
Lloyd Carr	Coach	2011
Anthony Carter	WR	2001
Bob Chappuis	HB	1988
Fritz Crisler	Coach	1954
Tom Curtis	S	2005
Dan Dierdorf	T	2000
Bump Elliott	HB	1989
Jumbo Elliott	T	2020
Pete Elliott	QB	1994
Benny Friedman	QB	1951
Tom Harmon	HB	1954
Willie Heston	C	1954
Elroy Hirsch	HB	1974
Desmond Howard	WR	2010
Steve Hutchinson	G	2024
Ron Johnson	RB	1992
Harry Kipke	HB	1958
Ron Kramer	E	1978
George Little	Coach	1955
Rob Lytle	RB	2015

Name	Position	Inducted
Jim Mandich	TE	2004
Johnny Maulbetsch	FB	1973
Reggie McKenzie	G	2002
Mark Messner	DT	2022
Bill Morley	HB	1971
David M. Nelson	Coach	1987
Harry Newman	QB	1975
Bennie Oosterbaan	E	1954
Merv Pregulman	T	1982
Tubby Raymond	Coach	2003
Bo Schembechler	Coach	1993
Germany Schulz	C	1951
Neil Snow	E	1978
Ernie Vick	C	1983
Tad Wieman	Coach	1956
Bob Westfall	FB	1987
Francis Wistert	T	1967
Albert Wistert	T	1968
Alvin Wistert	T	1981
Charles Woodson	CB	2018
Fielding H. Yost	Coach	1951

==== Pro Football Hall of Fame ====
Michigan inductees to the Pro Football Hall of Fame as of 2021.

Name	Position	Inducted
George Allen	Coach	2002
Dan Dierdorf	T	1996
Len Ford	DE	1976
Benny Friedman	QB	2005
Bill Hewitt	E	1971
Elroy Hirsch	HB/E	1968
Steve Hutchinson	G	2020
Ty Law	CB	2019
Tom Mack	G	1999
Ralph Wilson	Owner	2009
Charles Woodson	CB	2021

==== Rose Bowl Hall of Fame ====
The Rose Bowl Hall of Fame has inducted the following Michigan players and coaches.

Name	Position	Inducted
Mel Anthony	FB	2002
Lloyd Carr	Coach	2013
Bob Chappuis	HB/QB	1992
Bump Elliott	HB	1989
Brian Griese	QB	2012
Chuck Ortmann	HB	2008
Bo Schembechler	Coach	1993
Ron Simpkins	LB	2021
Neil Snow	E/FB	1990
Tyrone Wheatley	RB	2015
Charles Woodson	CB	2017
Butch Woolfolk	HB	1998

== NFL draft picks and active alumni ==
The University of Michigan has had 64 players selected in the first-round of the draft (AAFC, AFC and NFL), and had at least one player selected in any round in an NCAA record 88 consecutive NFL drafts dating back to 1938.

=== First-round NFL draft picks ===
Draft Year	Pick	Player	Selected by	Position
1941	1	Tom Harmon	Chicago Bears	Back
1941	10	Forest Evashevski	Washington Redskins	Back
1942	5	Bob Westfall	Detroit Lions	Back
1944	7	Merv Pregulman	Green Bay Packers	Guard
1945	5	Elroy Hirsch	Cleveland Rams	Back
1945	7	Don Lund	Chicago Bears	Back
1947	1	Elmer Madar	Miami Seahawks (AAFC)	End
1947	8	Bob Chappuis	Cleveland Browns (AAFC)	Back
1949	N/A	Dan Dworsky	Los Angeles Dons (AAFC)	Center
1949	N/A	Pete Elliott	Chicago Rockets (AAFC)	Back
1949	N/A	Gene Derricotte	Cleveland Browns (AAFC)	Back
1957	4	Ron Kramer	Green Bay Packers	End
1958	8	Jim Pace	San Francisco 49ers	Back
1960	N/A	Don Deskins	Minneapolis (AFL)	Tackle
1960	N/A	George Genyk	New York Titans (AFL)	Guard
1966	2	Tom Mack	Los Angeles Rams	Offensive tackle
1966	13	Bill Yearby	New York Jets (AFL)	Tackle
1967	20	Jim Detwiler	Baltimore Colts	Halfback
1969	20	Ron Johnson	Cleveland Browns	Running back
1972	18	Thom Darden	Cleveland Browns	Defensive back
1972	20	Mike Taylor	New York Jets	Linebacker
1973	7	Paul Seymour	Buffalo Bills	Offensive tackle
1974	20	Dave Gallagher	Chicago Bears	Defensive lineman
1975	26	Dave Brown	Pittsburgh Steelers	Defensive back
1978	13	Mike Kenn	Atlanta Falcons	Offensive tackle
1978	26	John Anderson	Green Bay Packers	Linebacker
1979	24	Jon Giesler	Miami Dolphins	Offensive tackle
1980	6	Curtis Greer	St. Louis Cardinals	Defensive end
1981	9	Mel Owens	Los Angeles Rams	Linebacker
1982	18	Butch Woolfolk	New York Giants	Running back
1985	17	Kevin Brooks	Dallas Cowboys	Defensive end
1987	26	Jim Harbaugh	Chicago Bears	Quarterback
1991	27	Jarrod Bunch	New York Giants	Fullback
1992	4	Desmond Howard	Washington Redskins	Wide Receiver
1993	14	Steve Everitt	Cleveland Browns	Center
1994	29	Derrick Alexander	Cleveland Browns	Wide receiver
1995	17	Tyrone Wheatley	New York Giants	Running back
1995	23	Ty Law	New England Patriots	Cornerback
1995	31	Trezelle Jenkins	Kansas City Chiefs	Offensive tackle
1996	8	Tim Biakabutuka	Carolina Panthers	Running back
1998	4	Charles Woodson	Oakland Raiders	Cornerback
2001	8	David Terrell	Chicago Bears	Wide receiver
2001	17	Steve Hutchinson	Seattle Seahawks	Offensive guard
2001	18	Jeff Backus	Detroit Lions	Offensive tackle
2004	26	Chris Perry	Cincinnati Bengals	Running back
2005	3	Braylon Edwards	Cleveland Browns	Wide receiver
2005	29	Marlin Jackson	Indianapolis Colts	Cornerback
2007	18	Leon Hall	Cincinnati Bengals	Cornerback
2008	1	Jake Long	Miami Dolphins	Offensive tackle
2010	13	Brandon Graham	Philadelphia Eagles	Defensive end
2014	11	Taylor Lewan	Tennessee Titans	Offensive tackle
2017	25	Jabrill Peppers	Cleveland Browns	Safety / linebacker
2017	28	Taco Charlton	Dallas Cowboys	Defensive end
2019	10	Devin Bush Jr.	Pittsburgh Steelers	Linebacker
2019	12	Rashan Gary	Green Bay Packers	Defensive end
2020	24	Cesar Ruiz	New Orleans Saints	Center
2021	21	Kwity Paye	Indianapolis Colts	Defensive end
2022	2	Aidan Hutchinson	Detroit Lions	Defensive end
2022	31	Daxton Hill	Cincinnati Bengals	Defensive back
2023	26	Mazi Smith	Dallas Cowboys	Defensive tackle
2024	10	J. J. McCarthy	Minnesota Vikings	Quarterback
2025	5	Mason Graham	Cleveland Browns	Defensive tackle
2025	10	Colston Loveland	Chicago Bears	Tight end
2025	13	Kenneth Grant	Miami Dolphins	Defensive tackle

=== Active alumni in the NFL ===
Updated: October 2026.

==== Players ====
- Jaishawn Barham: Dallas Cowboys
- AJ Barner: Seattle Seahawks
- Rayshaun Benny: Baltimore Ravens
- Ben Bredeson: Tampa Bay Buccaneers
- Max Bredeson: Minnesota Vikings
- Devin Bush: Chicago Bears
- Nico Collins: Houston Texans
- Junior Colson: Los Angeles Chargers
- Blake Corum: Los Angeles Rams
- Mike Danna: Buffalo Bills
- Tommy Doman: Buffalo Bills
- Rashan Gary: Dallas Cowboys
- Mason Graham: Cleveland Browns
- Kenneth Grant: Miami Dolphins
- Jaylen Harrell: Tennessee Titans
- Matthew Hibner: Baltimore Ravens
- Daxton Hill: Cincinnati Bengals
- Myles Hinton: Cincinnati Bengals
- Aidan Hutchinson: Detroit Lions
- Kris Jenkins: Cincinnati Bengals
- Will Johnson: Arizona Cardinals
- Trevor Keegan: Minnesota Vikings
- Marlin Klein: Houston Texans
- Jourdan Lewis: Jacksonville Jaguars
- David Long: New Orleans Saints
- Colston Loveland: Chicago Bears
- J. J. McCarthy: New York Giants
- Braiden McGregor: New York Jets
- Cameron McGrone: Las Vegas Raiders
- Josh Metellus: Minnesota Vikings
- Derrick Moore: Detroit Lions
- Mike Morris: Seattle Seahawks
- Kalel Mullings: Tennessee Titans
- Drake Nugent: San Francisco 49ers
- David Ojabo: New Orleans Saints
- Olu Oluwatimi: Seattle Seahawks
- Mike Onwenu: New England Patriots
- Kwity Paye: Las Vegas Raiders
- Josh Priebe: Minnesota Vikings
- Jimmy Rolder: Detroit Lions
- Cesar Ruiz: New Orleans Saints
- Jon Runyan: New York Giants
- Mike Sainristil: Washington Commanders
- Luke Schoonmaker: Dallas Cowboys
- Mazi Smith: Miami Dolphins
- Josaiah Stewart: Los Angeles Rams
- DJ Turner: Cincinnati Bengals
- Josh Uche: Miami Dolphins
- William Wagner: Cincinnati Bengals
- Josh Wallace: Los Angeles Rams
- Julius Welschof: Pittsburgh Steelers
- Roman Wilson: Pittsburgh Steelers
- Zak Zinter: Cleveland Browns
- Dominic Zvada: New York Giants

Active free agents: Karsen Barnhart, Ronnie Bell, Greg Crippen, Donovan Edwards, Graham Glasgow, Hassan Haskins, Ryan Hayes, LaDarius Henderson, Cornelius Johnson, Donaven McCulley, Jake Moody, Makari Paige, Damon Payne, Jabrill Peppers, Josh Ross, Andrew Stueber, Ambry Thomas, Chris Wormley.

==== Coaches ====
- Mike Elston: Los Angeles Chargers
  - Defensive line & run game coordinator
- Larry Foote: Tampa Bay Buccaneers
  - Outside linebackers & run game coordinator
- Harold Goodwin: Carolina Panthers
  - Assistant head coach & run game coordinator
- Jim Harbaugh: Los Angeles Chargers
  - Head coach
- Cato June: Indianapolis Colts
  - Assistant linebackers
- Jeff Kastl: Tampa Bay Buccaneers
  - Assistant tight ends
- Kevin Koger: Atlanta Falcons
  - Tight ends
- Jordan Kovacs: Cincinnati Bengals
  - Safeties
- Grant Newsome: New York Giants
  - Assistant offensive line
- John Spytek: Las Vegas Raiders
  - General manager
- Adam Stenavich: Green Bay Packers
  - Offensive coordinator

== Future scheduled opponents ==
Announced schedules as of September 2, 2026.

See also: current season

2027	2028	2029	2030	2031	2033	2034
Buffalo (August 28)	Central Michigan (September 2)	Bowling Green (August 25)	Eastern Michigan (September 7)	Central Michigan (August 30)	Notre Dame (September 3)	at Notre Dame (September 2)
at Texas (September 4)	Charlotte (September 9)	Western Michigan (September 1)				
Eastern Michigan (September 11)	Maryland, Michigan State, Nebraska, Northwestern, USC					
Illinois, Ohio State, Oregon, Rutgers	at: Ohio State, Purdue, Washington, Wisconsin					
at: Indiana, Iowa, Michigan State, Penn State, UCLA

== Related books ==
- Cnockaert, Jim (2003). Stadium Stories: Michigan Wolverines: Colorful Tales of the Maize and Blue. Globe Pequot. ISBN 0-7627-2784-5.
- Allen, Kevin; Regner, Art; Brown, Nate & Schembechler, Bo (2005). What it Means to Be a Wolverine: Michigan's Greatest Players, Talk about Michigan Football. Triumph Books. ISBN 1-5724-3661-1.
- Schembechler, Bo & Bacon, John U. (2007). Bo's Lasting Lessons: The Legendary Coach Teaches the Timeless Fundamentals of Leadership. Business Plus. ISBN 978-0-4465-8199-8.
- Falk, John & Ewald, Dan (2011). If These Walls Could Talk: Michigan Football Stories from Inside the Big House. Triump Books. ISBN 978-1-6007-8657-0.
- Gallagher, Martin John (2012). 98–21–2 The Story of the Heisman and the Michigan Man. CreateSpace Independent Publishing Platform. ISBN 978-1-4680-2135-6.
- Magee, Ken & Stevens, Jon M. (2015). The Game: The Michigan–Ohio State Football Rivalry. Arcadia Publishing. ISBN 978-1-5316-7160-0.
- Bacon, John U. (2011). Three and Out: Rich Rodriguez and the Michigan Wolverines in the Crucible of College Football. Farrar, Straus and Giroux. ISBN 978-0-8090-9466-0.
- Bacon, John U. (2013). Fourth and Long: The Fight for the Soul of College Football. Simon & Schuster. ISBN 978-1-4767-0643-6.
- Bacon, John U. (2015). Endzone: The Rise, Fall, and Return of Michigan Football. St. Martin's Press. ISBN 978-1-2500-7897-1.
- Bacon, John U. (2019). Overtime: Jim Harbaugh and the Michigan Wolverines at the Crossroads of College Football. William Morrow. ISBN 978-0-0628-8694-1.
