= 1991 Gator Bowl (January) =

1991 Mazda Gator Bowl
| Michigan Wolverines | Ole Miss Rebels |
| (8–3) | (9–2) |
| Big Ten | SEC |
| 35 | 3 |
| Head coach: Gary Moeller | Head coach: Billy Brewer |
| AP / Coaches; 12 / 12 | AP / Coaches; 15 / 14 |
| | 1 | 2 | 3 | 4 | Total |
|---|---|---|---|---|---|
| Michigan | 7 | 7 | 21 | 0 | 35 |
| Ole Miss | 0 | 3 | 0 | 0 | 3 |
- Date: January 1, 1991
- Season: 1990
- Stadium: Gator Bowl Stadium
- Location: Jacksonville, Florida
- MVP: Tom Dohring, Matt Elliott, Steve Everitt, Dean Dingman, Greg Skrepenak (Michigan OL); Tyrone Ashley (Mississippi DB)
- Referee: Buddy Ward (SICOA)
- Attendance: 68,297

United States TV coverage
- Network: ESPN
- Announcers: Ron Franklin, Gary Danielson

The 1991 Gator Bowl was a college football bowl game played on January 1, 1991. The Big Ten Conference co-champion Michigan Wolverines defeated the Ole Miss Rebels of the Southeastern Conference (SEC), 35–3. For sponsorship reasons, the game was officially known as the Mazda Gator Bowl.

This game was the last SEC–Big Ten matchup in the Gator Bowl for twenty years; the bowl entered into an exclusive contract featuring those two conferences beginning with the 2011 Gator Bowl.

== Teams ==
=== Michigan Wolverines ===
Michigan entered the game with an overall record of 8–3, 6–2 in the Big Ten.

=== Ole Miss Rebels ===
Ole Miss entered the game with an overall record of 9–2, 6–2 in the SEC.

== Scoring summary ==
=== First quarter ===
- Michigan - Desmond Howard, 63-yard pass from Elvis Grbac (John Carlson kick)

=== Second quarter ===
- Ole Miss - Brian Lee, 51-yard field goal
- Michigan - Jarrod Bunch, 7-yard pass from Elvis Grbac (John Carlson kick)

=== Third quarter ===
- Michigan - Desmond Howard, 50-yard pass from Elvis Grbac (John Carlson kick)
- Michigan - Jarrod Bunch, 5-yard run (John Carlson kick)
- Michigan - Derrick Alexander, 33-yard pass from Elvis Grbac (John Carlson kick)

=== Fourth quarter ===
- No score
