= List of Michigan State Spartans bowl games =

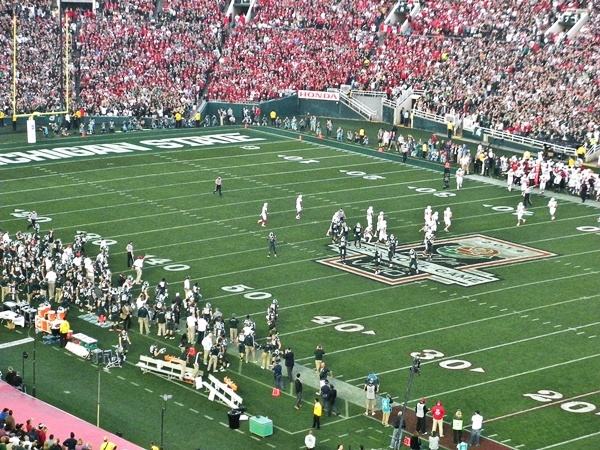
Michigan State defeated Stanford in the 2014 Rose Bowl

The Michigan State Spartans college football team competes as part of the National Collegiate Athletic Association (NCAA) Division I Football Bowl Subdivision (FBS), representing Michigan State University in the Big Ten Conference (Big Ten). Since the establishment of the team in 1896, Michigan State has appeared in 30 bowl games with an overall record of (14-16). Included in these games are five appearances in the Rose Bowl Game. Through the history of the program, nine separate coaches have led the Spartans to bowl games with Mark Dantonio having the most appearances with twelve.

== Key ==
General
†	Bowl game record attendance
‡	Former bowl game record attendance
§	Denotes College Football Playoff game

Results
W	Win
L	Loss

== Bowl games ==
List of bowl games showing bowl played in, score, date, season, opponent, stadium, location, attendance and head coach (Note: Statistics correct as of 2012–13 NCAA football bowl games.)
#	Bowl	Score (Note: Results are sortable first by whether the result was a Michigan State win, loss or tie and then second by the margin of victory.)	Date	Season (Note: Links to the season article for the Michigan State team that competed in the bowl for that year.)	Opponent (Note: Links to the season article for the opponent that Michigan State competed against in the bowl for that year when available or to their general page when unavailable.)	Stadium	Location	Attendance	Head coach
1	Orange Bowl	L 6–0	January 1, 1938	1937	Auburn	Miami Orange Bowl	Miami	18,972^{‡}	Charlie Bachman
2	Rose Bowl	W 28–20	January 1, 1954	1953	UCLA	Rose Bowl	Pasadena	100,500	Biggie Munn
3	Rose Bowl	W 17–14	January 1, 1956	1955	UCLA	Rose Bowl	Pasadena	100,809	Duffy Daugherty
4	Rose Bowl	L 14–12	January 1, 1966	1965	UCLA	Rose Bowl	Pasadena	100,087	Duffy Daugherty
5	Cherry Bowl	L 10–6	December 22, 1984	1984	Army	Pontiac Silverdome	Pontiac	70,332^{†}	George Perles
6	All-American Bowl	L 17–14	December 31, 1985	1985	Georgia Tech	Legion Field	Birmingham	45,000	George Perles
7	Rose Bowl	W 20–17	January 1, 1988	1987	USC	Rose Bowl	Pasadena	103,847	George Perles
8	Gator Bowl	L 34–27	January 1, 1989	1988	Georgia	Gator Bowl	Jacksonville	76,236	George Perles
9	Aloha Bowl	W 33–13	December 25, 1989	1989	Hawaii	Aloha Stadium	Honolulu	50,000^{†}	George Perles
10	John Hancock Bowl	W 17–16	December 31, 1990	1990	USC	Sun Bowl Stadium	El Paso	50,562	George Perles
11	Liberty Bowl	L 18–7	December 28, 1993	1993	Louisville	Liberty Bowl Memorial Stadium	Memphis	34,216	George Perles
12	Independence Bowl	L 45–26	December 29, 1995	1995	LSU	Independence Stadium	Shreveport	48,835	Nick Saban
13	Sun Bowl	L 38–0	December 31, 1996	1996	Stanford	Sun Bowl Stadium	El Paso	42,271	Nick Saban
14	Aloha Bowl	L 51–23	December 25, 1997	1997	Washington	Aloha Stadium	Honolulu	34,419	Nick Saban
15	Florida Citrus Bowl	W 37–34	January 1, 2000	1999	Florida	Citrus Bowl	Orlando	62,011	Bobby Williams
16	Silicon Valley Classic	W 44–35	December 31, 2001	2001	Fresno State	Spartan Stadium	San Jose	30,456^{†}	Bobby Williams
17	Alamo Bowl	L 17–3	December 29, 2003	2003	Nebraska	Alamodome	San Antonio	56,226	John L. Smith
18	Champs Sports Bowl	L 24–21	December 28, 2007	2007	Boston College	Citrus Bowl	Orlando	46,554	Mark Dantonio
19	Capital One Bowl	L 24–12	January 1, 2009	2008	Georgia	Citrus Bowl	Orlando	59,681	Mark Dantonio
20	Alamo Bowl	L 41–31	January 2, 2010	2009	Texas Tech	Alamodome	San Antonio	64,757	Mark Dantonio
21	Capital One Bowl	L 49–7	January 1, 2011	2010	Alabama	Citrus Bowl	Orlando	61,519	Mark Dantonio
22	Outback Bowl	W 33–30 ^{(3OT)}	January 2, 2012	2011	Georgia	Raymond James Stadium	Tampa	49,429	Mark Dantonio
23	Buffalo Wild Wings Bowl	W 17–16	December 29, 2012	2012	TCU	Sun Devil Stadium	Tempe	44,617	Mark Dantonio
24	Rose Bowl	W 24–20	January 1, 2014	2013	Stanford	Rose Bowl	Pasadena	95,173	Mark Dantonio
25	Cotton Bowl Classic	W 42–41	January 1, 2015	2014	Baylor	AT&T Stadium	Arlington	71,464	Mark Dantonio
26	Cotton Bowl Classic§	L 38–0	December 31, 2015	2015	Alabama	AT&T Stadium	Arlington	82,812	Mark Dantonio
27	Holiday Bowl	W 42–17	December 28, 2017	2017	Washington State	SDCCU Stadium	San Diego	47,092	Mark Dantonio
28	Redbox Bowl	L 7–6	December 31, 2018	2018	Oregon	Levi's Stadium	Santa Clara	30,212	Mark Dantonio
29	Pinstripe Bowl	W 27–21	December 27, 2019	2019	Wake Forest	Yankee Stadium	The Bronx	36,895	Mark Dantonio
30	Peach Bowl	W 31–21	December 30, 2021	2021	Pittsburgh	Mercedes-Benz Stadium	Atlanta	41,230	Mel Tucker

== Record by bowl game ==
Bowl Game	#	W	L	%
Alamo Bowl	2	0	2	.000
Aloha Bowl	2	1	1	.500
Buffalo Wild Wings Bowl	1	1	0	1.000
Champs Sports Bowl	1	0	1	.000
Cherry Bowl	1	0	1	.000
Citrus Bowl (Capital One Bowl)	3	1	2	.333
Cotton Bowl	2	1	1	.500
Gator Bowl	1	0	1	.000
Hall of Fame Classic	1	0	1	.000
Holiday Bowl	1	1	0	1.000
Independence Bowl	1	0	1	.000
Liberty Bowl	1	0	1	.000
Orange Bowl	1	0	1	.000
Outback Bowl	1	1	0	1.000
Peach Bowl	1	1	0	1.000
Pinstripe Bowl	1	1	0	1.000
Redbox Bowl	1	0	1	.000
Rose Bowl	5	4	1	.800
Silicon Valley Classic	1	1	0	1.000
Sun Bowl (John Hancock Bowl)	2	1	1	.500
