= Harlon Barnett =

American football player and coach (born 1967)

Current position
- Title: Associate head coach & safeties coach
- Team: Pittsburgh
- Conference: ACC

Biographical details
- Born: January 2, 1967 (age 59); Cincinnati, Ohio, U.S.

Playing career
- 1986–1989: Michigan State
- 1990–1992: Cleveland Browns
- 1993–1994: New England Patriots
- 1995–1996: Minnesota Vikings
- Position: Safety

Coaching career (HC unless noted)
- 1998–1999: Princeton HS (OH) (DB)
- 2000–2002: Princeton HS (OH) (DC)
- 2003: LSU (GA)
- 2004–2006: Cincinnati (DB)
- 2007–2014: Michigan State (DB)
- 2015–2017: Michigan State (AHC/co-DC/DB)
- 2018–2019: Florida State (DC/DB)
- 2020–2023: Michigan State (DB)
- 2023: Michigan State (interim HC)
- 2024–2025: Northwestern (AHC/DB)
- 2026–present: Pittsburgh (AHC/S)

Head coaching record
- Overall: 0–8

Accomplishments and honors

Awards
- First-team All-American (1989); First-team All-Big Ten (1989)

Harlon T. Barnett (born January 2, 1967) is an American football coach and former player who is currently the safeties coach at University of Pittsburgh. He was the interim head coach at Michigan State University for most of the 2023 season. Barnett previously served as associate head coach/co-defensive coordinator at Michigan State as well as defensive coordinator/defensive backs coach at Florida State University. As a player, Barnett was a four-year letter-winner as a defensive back for Michigan State University, serving as team captain and earning All-America honors during his senior year, and spent seven seasons in the National Football League.

== Early life ==
Barnett was born and raised in Cincinnati, Ohio, where he was a standout athlete at Princeton High School. Barnett earned a full athletic scholarship to play football at Michigan State University.

== Playing career ==
=== College ===
Barnett was a three-year starter for head coach George Perles at Michigan State. His individual success as a Spartan earned him first-team All-America recognition by the Sporting News in 1989. In that season, Barnett compiled 73 stops, three interceptions, and three fumble recoveries. Barnett played on the 1987 Big Ten and 1988 Rose Bowl championship team and played in the 1989 Gator Bowl and the 1989 Aloha Bowl. He finished his career as a Spartan with 154 tackles, six interceptions, and 13 pass break-ups.

=== NFL ===
Following his impressive career at Michigan State, Barnett was drafted by the Cleveland Browns in the fourth round of the 1990 NFL draft. He played three seasons (1990–92) in Cleveland before spending two seasons (1993–94) with the New England Patriots and two seasons (1995–96) with the Minnesota Vikings.

== Broadcasting career ==
Barnett earned his bachelor's degree in communication from Michigan State in 1990. He went to broadcasting school while playing for the Cleveland Browns. Barnett was recruited in 1998 by then-Michigan State head coach Nick Saban to serve as a sideline reporter for Michigan State football. He served as a sideline reporter for Saban's final two seasons at Michigan State.

== Coaching career ==
=== LSU ===
The next time Barnett interviewed with Saban, it was for a graduate assistant opening on Saban's LSU football staff. In Barnett's sole season as a GA at LSU, the Tigers won the 2004 Sugar Bowl (BCS National Championship Game).

=== Cincinnati ===
The following season, Barnett was hired as defensive backs coach at the University of Cincinnati under Mark Dantonio. In his initial season (2004), the Bearcats led Conference USA and ranked No. 26 nationally in pass defense, allowing only 194.2 yards per game. In his final season at Cincinnati (2006), the Bearcats ranked No. 23 nationally in pass efficiency defense, with a 109.3 rating. In thee seasons at Cincinnati, Barnett coached four defensive backs to all-conference honors.

=== Michigan State ===
Barnett returned to his alma mater in 2007 as a coach. In Barnett's first 11 seasons in East Lansing, the Spartans were 100–45 with three Big Ten Conference championships (2010, 2013, 2015) and were selected for the College Football Playoff in 2015. He coached the defensive backs his entire 11 years under Dantonio; he was promoted to assistant head coach and co-defensive coordinator prior to Michigan State's victory in the 2015 Cotton Bowl Classic over Baylor, and was again promoted to associate head coach in June 2017.

=== Florida State ===
Barnett also spent two seasons as defensive coordinator at Florida State University under Willie Taggart. Barnett's experience at Florida State was integral to his development as injuries forced him to experiment with foreign schemes and coverages. Ultimately, his time was cut short at Florida State after Taggart's head coaching contract was bought out early.

=== Return to Michigan State ===
Barnett returned to Michigan State in 2020 to coach the secondary. When head coach Mel Tucker was suspended and then fired in September 2023 over a sexual harassment scandal, Barnett succeeded him as interim head coach. Jonathan Smith was hired as the permanent head coach that November. Barnett was one of two coaches (Courtney Hawkins) retained on the new coaching staff by Smith.

=== Player development ===
Barnett is known for his success in developing players at the University of Cincinnati, Michigan State University and Florida State University. In three seasons at Cincinnati, Barnett coached four defensive backs to all-conference honors. For Michigan State University, Barnett has coached 10 Spartan defensive backs who have been selected in the NFL draft, two of whom were first-round picks (Darqueze Dennard, No. 24, Cincinnati Bengals, 2014; and Trae Waynes, No. 11, Minnesota Vikings, 2015), four All-Americans, three Thorpe Award semifinalists, and one Thorpe Award recipient.

During his time with Florida State University, Barnett coached five players who earned All-ACC recognition, a Bednarick Award semifinalist, and five players selected in the NFL Draft (Brian Burns, No. 16, Carolina Panthers, 2019; Asante Samuel Jr., No. 47, Los Angeles Chargers, 2021; Janarius Robinson, No. 134, Minnesota Vikings, 2021; Joshua Kaindoh, No. 144, Kansas City Chiefs, 2021; Hamsah Nasirildeen, No. 186, New York Jets, 2021).

== Personal life ==
Barnett married his college sweetheart, Tammy Barnett, in 1991 and they have two children, Todd and Tori.

== Head coaching record ==
Year	Team	Overall	Conference	Standing	Bowl/playoffs
Michigan State Spartans (Big Ten Conference) (2023)
2023	Michigan State	0–8 (Note: 2 conference wins were vacated as a result of an NCAA settlement over recruiting violations during Mel Tucker's tenure.)	0–7	6th (East)	
Michigan State:		0–8	0–7		
Total:		0–8			
