= Blake Ezor =

American football player (born 1966)

No. 35, 26
- Position: Running back

Personal information
- Born: October 11, 1966 (age 60); Las Vegas, Nevada, U.S.
- Listed height: 5 ft 9 in (1.75 m)
- Listed weight: 181 lb (82 kg)

Career information
- High school: Gorman (Las Vegas)
- College: Michigan State (1986–1989)
- NFL draft: 1990: undrafted

Career history
- Denver Broncos (1990); Edmonton Eskimos (1992)

Awards and highlights
- 2× Second-team All-Big Ten (1988, 1989)

Career NFL statistics
- Rushing yards: 81
- Rushing average: 3.5
- Return yards: 214
- Stats at Pro Football Reference

Blake Ezor (born October 11, 1966) is an American former professional football player who was a running back for the Denver Broncos of the National Football League (NFL) and the Edmonton Eskimos of the Canadian Football League (CFL). He played college football for the Michigan State Spartans.

== College career ==
Ezor is ranked third in all-time rushing yards at Michigan State University with 3,749 yards. He owns the Spartan record for most touchdowns scored in a single game, 6 against Northwestern University in 1989. As a freshman, Ezor rushed for 337 yards in 1986 season with 1 touchdown. In 1987 season he rushed for 592 yards and 3 touchdowns. He won the 1988 Rose Bowl and the Big Ten Championship in 1987. In 1988 Ezor rushed for 1,350 yards and 10 touchdowns. He played in the 1989 Gator Bowl. In 1989, his senior year, he rushed for 1,120 yards and 16 touchdowns. Ezor won the 1989 Aloha Bowl MVP. He played in the All–Star Game in 1990 in Japan that was called the Japan Bowl.
