= 1989 Michigan State Spartans football team =

American college football season

1989 Michigan State Spartans football

Aloha Bowl champion

Aloha Bowl, W 33–13 vs. Hawaii
- Conference: Big Ten Conference

Ranking
- Coaches: No. 16
- AP: No. 16
- Record: 8–4 (6–2 Big Ten)
- Head coach: George Perles (7th season)
- Offensive coordinator: Morris Watts (4th season)
- Defensive coordinator: Norm Parker (2nd season)
- MVP: Percy Snow
- Captains: Harlon Barnett; Bob Kula; Steve Montgomery
- Home stadium: Spartan Stadium

1989 Big Ten Conference football standings
	Conf.					Overall
Team	W		L		T	W		L		T
No. 7 Michigan $	8	–	0	–	0	10	–	2	–	0
No. 10 Illinois	7	–	1	–	0	10	–	2	–	0
No. 16 Michigan State	6	–	2	–	0	8	–	4	–	0
No. 24 Ohio State	6	–	2	–	0	8	–	4	–	0
Minnesota	4	–	4	–	0	6	–	5	–	0
Indiana	3	–	5	–	0	5	–	6	–	0
Iowa	3	–	5	–	0	5	–	6	–	0
Purdue	2	–	6	–	0	3	–	8	–	0
Wisconsin	1	–	7	–	0	2	–	9	–	0
Northwestern	0	–	8	–	0	0	–	11	–	0
$ – Conference champion; Rankings from AP Poll

The 1989 Michigan State Spartans football team represented Michigan State University in the 1989 NCAA Division I-A football season. The Spartans played their home games at Spartan Stadium in East Lansing, Michigan and were coached by George Perles. The team finished the season 8–4 overall and 6–2 in conference play. The Spartans were invited to the 1989 Aloha Bowl where they defeated Hawaii, 33–13. The Spartans were ranked No. 16 in the final AP Poll and Coaches Poll.

== Schedule ==
Date	Time	Opponent	Rank	Site	TV	Result	Attendance	Source
September 16	1:05 p.m.	Miami (OH)*		Spartan Stadium; East Lansing, MI		W 49–0	66,474	
September 23	2:30 p.m.	at No. 1 Notre Dame*		Notre Dame Stadium; Notre Dame, IN (rivalry)	CBS	L 13–21	59,075	
September 30	3:30 p.m.	No. 2 Miami (FL)*		Spartan Stadium; East Lansing, MI	ABC	L 20–26	76,217	
October 7	2:05 p.m.	at Iowa	No. 24	Kinnick Stadium; Iowa City, IA		W 17–14	67,700	
October 14	3:30 p.m.	No. 5 Michigan	No. 21	Spartan Stadium; East Lansing, MI (rivalry)	ABC	L 7–10	76,913	
October 21	12:30 p.m.	Illinois^{†}		Spartan Stadium; East Lansing, MI	ESPN	L 10–14	76,216	
October 28	2:01 p.m.	at Purdue		Ross–Ade Stadium; West Lafayette, IN		W 28–21	41,402	
November 4	12:30 p.m.	at Indiana		Memorial Stadium; Bloomington, IN (rivalry)	ESPN	W 51–20	51,567	
November 11	1:00 p.m.	Minnesota		Spartan Stadium; East Lansing, MI		W 21–7	73,259	
November 18	1:05 p.m.	Northwestern		Spartan Stadium; East Lansing, MI		W 76–14	64,817	
November 25	2:05 p.m.	at Wisconsin	No. 25	Camp Randall Stadium; Madison, WI		W 31–3	29,776	
December 25	3:30 p.m.	vs. No. 25 Hawaii*	No. 22	Aloha Stadium; Honolulu, HI (Aloha Bowl)	ABC	W 33–13	50,000	
*Non-conference game; ^{†}Homecoming; Rankings from AP Poll released prior to the game; All times are in Central time

== Rankings ==
Ranking movements Legend: ██ Increase in ranking ██ Decrease in ranking — = Not ranked т = Tied with team above or below
	Week																
Poll	Pre	1	2	3	4	5	6	7	8	9	10	11	12	13	14	15	Final
AP	—	—	—	—	—	24	21	—	—	—	—	—	25	22	22	22	16
Coaches	—	—	—	—	—	—	19 т	—	—	—	—	—	—	—	—	—	16 т

== Game summaries ==
=== At Notre Dame ===
Michigan State Spartans (1–0) at #1 Notre Dame Fighting Irish (2–0)

Quarter	1	2	3	4	Total
Michigan St	0	6	7	0	13
Notre Dame	7	7	0	7	21

at Notre Dame Stadium, South Bend, Indiana

- Date: September 23
- Game time: 2:30 p.m. EDT
- Game attendance: 59,075
- TV: CBS
- Recap/Box Score

Game information

First quarter

- ND – Ricky Watters 2-yard run (Craig Hentrich kick), 4:54. Notre Dame 7–0. Drive: 14 plays, 72 yards, 6:16.

Second quarter

- ND – Ricky Watters 53-yard run (Craig Hentrich kick), 9:10. Notre Dame 14–0.
- MSU – John Langeloh 36-yard field goal, 2:54. Notre Dame 14–3.
- MSU – John Langeloh 38-yard field goal, 0:00. Notre Dame 14–6.

Third quarter

- MSU – James Bradley 30-yard pass from Dan Enos (John Langeloh kick), 6:36. Notre Dame 14–13.

Fourth quarter

- ND – Anthony Johnson 1-yard run (Craig Hentrich kick), 8:16. Notre Dame 21–13. Drive: 9 plays, 62 yards.

Top passers

- MSU – Dan Enos – 18/28, 200 yards, TD
- ND – Tony Rice – 8/15, 90 yards

Top rushers

- MSU – Hyland Hickson – 26 rushes, 84 yards
- ND – Ricky Watters – 16 rushes, 89 yards, 2 TD

Top receivers

- MSU – Courtney Hawkins – 6 receptions, 83 yards
- ND – Raghib Ismail – 2 receptions, 27 yards

=== Miami (FL) ===
#2 Miami (FL) at Michigan State

Team	1	2	3	4	Total
• Hurricanes	3	7	10	6	26
Spartans	3	7	3	7	20

- Date: September 30
- Location: Spartan Stadium, East Lansing, Michigan
- Game attendance: 76,217
- Referee: Jim Kemerling
- TV announcers (ABC): Gary Bender, Dick Vermeil, Cheryl Miller

Scoring summary
1	7:56	MIA	Huerta 32-yard field goal	MIA 3–0
1	3:59	MSU	Langeloh 46-yard field goal	Tied 3–3
2	5:32	MSU	Enos 19-yard run (Langeloh kick)	MSU 10–3
2	2:14	MIA	Carroll 5-yard pass from Torretta (Huerta kick)	Tied 10–10
3	11:52	MIA	Johnson 38-yard run (Huerta kick)	MIA 17–10
3	6:42	MIA	Huerta 27-yard field goal	MIA 20–10
3	2:48	MSU	Langeloh 27-yard field goal	MIA 20–13
4		MSU	Harlon Barnett 35-yard interception return	Tied 20–20
4	5:04	MIA	Huerta 27-yard field goal	MIA 23–20
4	0:54	MIA	Huerta 52-yard field goal	MIA 26–20

=== Michigan ===
#5 Michigan Wolverines (3–1) at #21 Michigan State Spartans (2–2)

Quarter	1	2	3	4	Total
Michigan	7	3	0	0	10
Michigan St	0	0	0	7	7

at Spartan Stadium, East Lansing, Michigan

- Date: October 14, 1989
- Game time: 3:30 p.m.
- Game weather: Sunny, 82 °F (28 °C)
- Game attendance: 76,913
- Referee: Ron Winter
- TV: ABC
- Box Score

Team	Category	Player	Statistics
Michigan	Passing	Elvis Grbac	8/15, 76 Yds, INT
Michigan	Rushing	Tony Boles	22 Rush, 100 Yds
Michigan	Receiving	Greg McMurtry	2 Rec, 33 Yds
Michigan St	Passing	Dan Enos	21/31, 214 Yds, TD, 2 INT
Michigan St	Rushing	Blake Ezor	27 Rush, 69 Yds
Michigan St	Receiving	Courtney Hawkins	8 Rec, 89 Yds, TD

Scoring summary

Quarter	Time	Drive			Team	Scoring information	Score	
Quarter	Time	Plays	Yards	TOP	Team	Scoring information	UM	MSU
1	12:20	12	61	6:31	Michigan	Leroy Hoard 1-yard touchdown run, J.D. Carlson kick good	7	0
2	5:44	13	56	6:00	Michigan	35-yard field goal by J.D. Carlson	10	0
4	9:51	8	52	3:16	Michigan St	Courtney Hawkins 4-yard touchdown reception from Dan Enos, John Langeloh kick good	10	7
"TOP" = time of possession. For other American football terms, see Glossary of American football.							10	7

=== At Purdue ===
Michigan State Spartans (2–4) at Purdue Boilermakers (1–5)

Quarter	1	2	Total
Michigan St	0	28	28
Purdue	0	21	21

at Ross–Ade Stadium, West Lafayette, Indiana

- Date: October 24, 1989
- Game attendance: 41,402

Courtney Hawkins set single game school receiving yardage record

Team	Category	Player	Statistics
Michigan St	Passing		
Michigan St	Rushing		
Michigan St	Receiving	Courtney Hawkins	7 Rec, 193 Yds, TD
Purdue	Passing	Eric Hunter	18/26, 253 Yds, 3 TD, INT
Purdue	Rushing		
Purdue	Receiving		

Scoring summary

Quarter	Time	Drive			Team	Scoring information	Score	
Quarter	Time	Plays	Yards	TOP	Team	Scoring information	MSU	PUR
3					Michigan St	Courtney Hawkins 80-yard touchdown reception from Dan Enos, kick good	14	0
4					Purdue	Calvin Williams -yard touchdown reception from Eric Hunter, Larry Sullivan kick good	28	7
4		5	69		Purdue	Rod Dennis 20-yard touchdown reception from Eric Hunter, Larry Sullivan kick good	28	14
4		2	41		Purdue	Abe Hoskins 34-yard touchdown reception from Eric Hunter, Larry Sullivan kick good	28	21
"TOP" = time of possession. For other American football terms, see Glossary of American football.							28	21

=== At Wisconsin ===
	1	2	3	4	Total
Michigan St	7	3	7	14	31
Wisconsin	0	3	0	0	3

- MSU: Ezor 3 run (Langeloh kick)
- MSU: Langeloh 23 FG
- WIS: Thompson 36 FG
- MSU: Ezor 1 run (Langeloh kick)
- MSU: Enos 7 run (Langeloh kick)
- MSU: Ezor 56 run (Langeloh kick)
- Attendance: 29,776
- Rushing: MSU Ezor 30-187; WIS Hunt 7-19
- Passing: MSU Enos 7-14-64; WIS Wilson 18-27-202
- Receiving: MSU Hawkins 2-23; WIS Miller 7-67

== Personnel ==
1989 Michigan State Spartans football team roster
Players
Coaches
Offense

Pos.	#	Name	Class
WR		James Bradley
RB		Tico Duckett
QB	4	Dan Enos	Jr
RB	26	Blake Ezor	Sr
QB		John Gieselman
RB		Ty Hallock
WR		Courtney Hawkins
RB		Hyland Hickson
OL		Jim Johnson
OL		Matt Keller
OL		Bob Kula
TE		Carlos Marino
RB		Steve Montgomery
OT	77	Eric Moten	Jr
OL		Jeff Pearson
TE		Kurt Prins
RB		Rob Roy
RB		Scott Selzer
WR		Brian Smolinski
QB		Randy Vanderbush
OL		Roosevelt Wagner
TE	29	Duane Young	Jr

Defense

Pos.	#	Name	Class
CB	36	Harlon Barnett	Sr
LB		Tony Briningstool
LB		Chuck Bullough
DL		Travis Davis
DB		Ventson Donelson
LB		Dixon Edwards
DB		Alan Haller
DB	9	Mike Iaquaniello	Jr
LB	51	Carlos Jenkins	Jr
DL		Bill Johnson
LB		Brian Jones
DB		Todd Murray
DL		Tim Ridinger
LB	48	Percy Snow	Sr
DE	91	Jim Szymanski	Sr
DE	66	Matt Vanderbeek	Sr
DL		Chris Willertz
DL		Bobby Wilson
DB		Freddie Wilson

Special teams

Pos.	#	Name	Class
P		Josh Butland
K		John Langeloh

Head coach

- George Perles

Coordinators/assistant coaches

Legend

- (C) Team captain
- (S) Suspended
- (I) Ineligible
- Injured
- Redshirt

== 1990 NFL draft ==
The following players were selected in the 1990 NFL draft.

Player	Round	Pick	Position	NFL team
Percy Snow	1	13	Linebacker	Kansas City Chiefs
Travis Davis	4	85	Nose tackle	Phoenix Cardinals
Harlon Barnett	4	101	Defensive back	Cleveland Browns
Bob Kula	7	175	Tackle	Seattle Seahawks
Jim Szymanski	10	259	Defensive end	Denver Broncos
Ventson Donelson	12	309	Defensive back	New England Patriots
