= Aloha Bowl =

Former American college football game

Aloha Bowl (defunct)
- Stadium: Aloha Stadium
- Location: Honolulu, Hawaii
- Operated: 1982–2000
- Preceded by: Pineapple Bowl
- Succeeded by: Hawaii Bowl

Sponsors
- Jeep Corporation

Former names
- Jeep-Eagle Aloha Bowl; Jeep Aloha Bowl

The Aloha Bowl was a college football bowl game played in Honolulu, Hawaii, at Aloha Stadium. Certified by the National Collegiate Athletic Association (NCAA), the game featured teams from Division I-A (later known as the Football Bowl Subdivision).

== History ==
The Aloha Bowl was established in 1982 by Mackay Yanagisawa, a sportsman from Oahu. With the exception of the 1983–1986 playings, the Aloha Bowl was traditionally played on Christmas morning in Honolulu. For most of its playings, the game was sponsored by Jeep Corporation. The bowl originally applied for certification by the NCAA Division I Championship Committee in 1981, but certification was delayed until 1982. The inaugural game was played in 1982 and the last game was played in 2000, after it lost its sponsorship as a result of a corporate merger between Jeep and DaimlerChrysler. In 1998 and 1999, the Aloha Bowl was part of a doubleheader followed by the Oahu Bowl; the 1998 event was the first televised doubleheader in American college football history.

After Jeep dropped its sponsorship, the bowl committees of the Hawaiian bowl games elected to move the games to the U.S. mainland. The Oahu Bowl moved to Seattle and was played as the Seattle Bowl for two years. The Aloha Bowl was to move to San Francisco, but before the move could be completed the game lost its bowl certification. San Francisco later received a bowl game, first played in December 2002 as the San Francisco Bowl, which later operated under several other names. Hawaii did not remain without a bowl for long, however, as a new bowl committee received certification in 2002 for a Christmastime game, the Hawaii Bowl, at Aloha Stadium.

The Aloha Bowl was preceded years earlier by the Poi Bowl (late 1930s) and Pineapple Bowl (1940s and early 1950s).

== Game results ==
Date	Winner		Loser		Attendance	Notes
December 25, 1982	#9 Washington	21	#16 Maryland	20	30,055	notes
December 26, 1983	Penn State	13	Washington	10	37,212	notes
December 29, 1984	#10 SMU	27	#17 Notre Dame	20	41,777	notes
December 28, 1985	#13 Alabama	24	USC	3	35,183	notes
December 27, 1986	#13 Arizona	30	North Carolina	21	26,743	notes
December 25, 1987	#10 UCLA	20	Florida	16	24,839	notes
December 25, 1988	#18 Washington State	24	#14 Houston	22	35,132	notes
December 25, 1989	#22 Michigan State	33	#19 Hawaii	13	50,000	notes
December 25, 1990	Syracuse	28	Arizona	0	14,185	notes
December 25, 1991	Georgia Tech	18	#17 Stanford	17	34,433	notes
December 25, 1992	Kansas	23	#23 BYU	20	42,933	notes
December 25, 1993	#17 Colorado	41	#24 Fresno State	30	44,009	notes
December 25, 1994	#25 Boston College	12	#8 Kansas State	7	44,862	notes
December 25, 1995	#11 Kansas	51	#24 UCLA	30	41,111	notes
December 25, 1996	Navy	42	Cal	38	43,380	notes
December 25, 1997	#21 Washington	51	#25 Michigan State	23	44,598	notes
December 25, 1998	Colorado	51	#21 Oregon	43	46,451	notes
December 25, 1999	Wake Forest	23	Arizona State	3	40,974	notes
December 25, 2000	Boston College	31	Arizona State	17	24,397	notes

== Appearances by team ==
Rank	Team	Appearances	Wins	Losses	Win %
1	Washington	3	2	1	.667
T2	Boston College	2	2	0	1.000
T2	Colorado	2	2	0	1.000
T2	Arizona State	2	0	2	.000
T2	Kansas	2	2	0	1.000
T2	Arizona	2	1	1	.500
T2	Michigan State	2	1	1	.500
T2	UCLA	2	1	1	.500
T3	Alabama	1	1	0	1.000
T3	Georgia Tech	1	1	0	1.000
T3	Navy	1	1	0	1.000
T3	Penn State	1	1	0	1.000
T3	SMU	1	1	0	1.000
T3	Syracuse	1	1	0	1.000
T3	Wake Forest	1	1	0	1.000
T3	Washington State	1	1	0	1.000
T3	BYU	1	0	1	.000
T3	Cal	1	0	1	.000
T3	Florida	1	0	1	.000
T3	Fresno State	1	0	1	.000
T3	Hawaii	1	0	1	.000
T3	Houston	1	0	1	.000
T3	Kansas State	1	0	1	.000
T3	Maryland	1	0	1	.000
T3	North Carolina	1	0	1	.000
T3	Notre Dame	1	0	1	.000
T3	Oregon	1	0	1	.000
T3	Stanford	1	0	1	.000
T3	USC	1	0	1	.000

== Appearances by conference ==
Rank	Conference	Appearances	Record	Win %	# of Teams	Teams
1	Pac-10	14	5–9	.357	9	Washington (2–1) Arizona (1–1) UCLA (1–1) Arizona State (0–2) Washington State (1–0) Cal (0–1) Oregon (0–1) Stanford (0–1) USC (0–1)
T2	ACC	4	2–2	.500	4	Georgia Tech (1–0) Maryland (0–1) North Carolina (0–1) Wake Forest (1–0)
T2	Big Eight	4	3–1	.750	3	Kansas (2–0) Colorado (1–0) Kansas State (0–1)
T2	Independent	4	3–1	.750	3	Navy (1–0) Notre Dame (0–1) Penn State (1–0) Syracuse (1–0)
5	WAC	3	0–3	.000	3	BYU (0–1) Fresno State (0–1) Hawaii (0–1)
T6	Big East	2	2–0	1.000	1	Boston College (2–0)
T6	Big Ten	2	1–1	.500	1	Michigan State (1–1)
T6	SEC	2	1–1	.500	2	Alabama (1–0) Florida (0–1)
T6	SWC	2	1–1	.500	2	SMU (1–0) Houston (0–1)
10	Big 12	1	1–0	1.000	1	Colorado (1–0)

*Note: Table based on conference affiliation at the time the game was played and may not represent current conference alignment.

== Television ==
Most editions of the Aloha Bowl were televised by ABC (1986–2000).

== See also ==
- List of college bowl games
