= Tony Mandarich =

Canadian gridiron football player (born 1966)

No. 77, 79
- Position: Tackle

Personal information
- Born: September 23, 1966 (age 60); Oakville, Ontario, Canada
- Listed height: 6 ft 6 in (1.98 m)
- Listed weight: 330 lb (150 kg)

Career information
- High school: Theodore Roosevelt (Kent, Ohio, U.S.)
- College: Michigan State (1984–1988)
- NFL draft: 1989: 1st round, 2nd overall pick
- CFL draft: 1988: 7th round, 54th overall pick

Career history
- Green Bay Packers (1989–1992); Indianapolis Colts (1996–1998)

Awards and highlights
- UPI Lineman of the Year (1988); Unanimous All-American (1988); Second-team All-American (1987); 2× Big Ten Offensive Lineman of the Year (1987, 1988); 2× First-team All-Big Ten (1987, 1988)

Career NFL statistics
- Games played: 86
- Games started: 63
- Fumble recoveries: 2
- Stats at Pro Football Reference

Ante Josip "Tony" Mandarich (born September 23, 1966) is a Canadian former professional football tackle who played in the National Football League (NFL) for seven seasons. Referred to as "the best offensive line prospect ever" during his college football career with the Michigan State Spartans, he won UPI Lineman of the Year in 1988. Mandarich was selected second overall by the Green Bay Packers in the 1989 NFL draft, but was unable to meet expectations and released after four seasons. Following three seasons away from football, he returned with the Indianapolis Colts, where he spent his last three seasons. He is the only top five pick in his draft class not inducted to the Pro Football Hall of Fame.

== Early life and college ==
Mandarich was born and raised in Oakville, Ontario, Canada, the son of Croatian immigrants. After his older brother John received a scholarship to play football at Kent State University in Kent, Ohio, John convinced his parents to allow Tony to play his senior year of high school football at Theodore Roosevelt High School in Kent to improve his chances of receiving a scholarship. Recruited to Michigan State University by defensive coordinator Nick Saban, Mandarich helped lead Michigan State to its last outright Big Ten Conference title in the pre-championship game era, and a berth in the 1988 Rose Bowl. He was a unanimous first-team All-American in his senior year, an Outland Award finalist and a two-time Big Ten Lineman of the Year.

== Professional career ==
Upon his entry into the 1989 NFL draft, both scouts and media (most notably Sports Illustrated, which did a cover story on him, nicknaming him "the Incredible Bulk") began trumpeting Mandarich as the best offensive line prospect ever, touting his "measurables". "He weighed 330, ran the 40 [yard dash] in 4.65 seconds, did a standing long jump of 10'3", leaped vertically 30" and bench-pressed 225 pounds an unheard-of 39 times". He appeared on the cover of Sports Illustrated twice and was also a colorful character, illustrated by such instances as challenging then–Heavyweight Boxing Champion Mike Tyson to a fight, missing scheduled public appearances due to being drunk or hungover, his well-documented love of the band Guns N' Roses (he had a dog named Axl and also a tattoo of the cross-design from the cover of Appetite for Destruction on his arm), and referring to Green Bay as "a village".

Going into the 1989 draft, Mandarich was considered one of the best prospects for an offensive lineman ever and a top-five pick. Mandarich was selected second overall by the Green Bay Packers.

Drafted as an offensive tackle, Mandarich never lived up to the stellar expectations set for him. After a lengthy holdout, which was not settled until the week before the regular-season kickoff, his play was so slovenly that he only played for nine series in his first year; he spent most of the season on the special-teams unit. He was also known for having attitude issues. He was quoted as saying, "I am not like other players, I am Tony Mandarich, and they have to understand that. If they don't like it, that is just the way I am and they are going to learn to like it."

Although he started every game in 1990 and 1991, he soon became notorious in the league for lackluster play, allowing 21 sacks and 36 knockdowns. He frequently found himself overmatched against defensive linemen. In a 1991 game against the Philadelphia Eagles, for instance, Mandarich was lined up opposite Reggie White for most of the game. Defensive tackle Mike Golic later recalled that White was "throwing Mandarich around" so often that he found himself having to keep from tripping over Mandarich. As Golic put it, White treated Mandarich "like a toy". His play slightly improved in 1991, but many scouts of the time considered him an average tackle at best, far below expectations for the second overall pick.

After three seasons of lackluster performance on a four-year contract, Mandarich's tenure as a Packer all but ended in the first preseason game of the 1992 season when he suffered what initially looked like a mild concussion. However, he was still suffering headaches and dizziness four days later and checked himself into the hospital. Doctors diagnosed him with a moderate to severe concussion, as well as an underactive thyroid. He was placed on injured reserve until October 4. He would not play at all that season due to post-concussion syndrome. Despite his underwhelming play, head coach Mike Holmgren and general manager Ron Wolf were still willing to support him. However, when he left Green Bay after the season and skipped several workouts, Wolf lost patience and cut him. Mandarich is often referred to as one of the top five NFL draft busts of all time, having been drafted ahead of future NFL stars such as Barry Sanders, Derrick Thomas, Deion Sanders, Steve Atwater, Eric Metcalf, and Andre Rison. The September 28, 1992, cover of Sports Illustrated featuring Mandarich labelled him "The NFL's Incredible Bust".

The question of steroid use has been discussed as a possible factor in Mandarich's professional struggles. Mandarich did not admit his steroid use until 2008, though according to SI, he told at least one Packer teammate that he did use steroids. Until then, he publicly blamed his work ethic in a 2003 Milwaukee Journal-Sentinel article: "I wanted to create as much hype as I could for many different reasons—exposure, negotiation leverage, you name it. And it all worked, except the performance wasn't there when it was time to play football." The first Sports Illustrated cover story included allegations of steroid abuse in college, however, mentioning acne of his arms and premature balding.

After being cut by the Packers, he went to Traverse City, Michigan for two years, addicted to drugs and alcohol. His family checked him into a rehabilitation clinic on March 23, 1995, and he became sober. Mandarich returned to football in 1996 with the Indianapolis Colts, seeing his first meaningful game action in five years. He started all 16 games during the 1997 season and retired from football as an Indianapolis Colt in 1998 due to a shoulder injury.

== Post-football career ==
After his career was over, he moved back to Canada. He owned a golf course and remarried his wife Char in 2004. From September 2004 until September 2005, Mandarich served as an NFL analyst for The Score TV sports network in Canada. He quit in October 2005 and moved to Arizona.

He now runs a photography studio, having begun doing nature photography as a hobby in 1990. Mandarich has expanded his business, named Mandarich Media Group, to include photography, video production, web design, search engine optimization, and Internet marketing.

In September 2008, Mandarich admitted to using anabolic steroids during his college career at Michigan State, and that he faked a drug test before the 1988 Rose Bowl. Mandarich stated that he did not use steroids while in the NFL, but did reveal that he was addicted to alcohol and painkillers while playing for the Packers. Mandarich went further in 2009, saying he used steroids from late in his senior year of high school until the 1989 NFL Combine. According to Mandarich, at least one team, the Kansas City Chiefs, passed on drafting him when they suspected he was using steroids. He only stopped because NFL testing procedures even then made it impossible to cheat. The end of his steroid habit combined with his poor pass blocking sunk his NFL career.

Tony Mandarich's older brother John made his own reputation in professional football in the Canadian Football League. John Mandarich's early death from skin cancer is documented in Tony's memoir.

In the March 2009 issue of Sports Illustrated, Mandarich spoke about his use and addiction and about his book called My Dirty Little Secrets — Steroids, Alcohol & God. In that book, Mandarich ascribed his underwhelming performance with the Green Bay Packers to his painkiller addiction, which sapped his drive and work ethic. His addiction was such that he kept syringes in his athletic supporter to have his narcotics supply close at hand. Mandarich went on to describe his traumatic and triumphant stint in rehabilitation, and his subsequent return to the NFL. "I didn't write the book for forgiveness," Mandarich said. "I wrote the book for explanation and for, hopefully, helping somebody see the light that there is hope for addiction or alcoholism and that you can change and save your life."

In 2009, Mandarich was sued by his former girlfriend for posting explicit photographs of her online.

In 2019, ESPN broadcast an hour long documentary on Mandarich as an episode of its sports newsmagazine series E:60.

== Bibliography ==
- Mandarich, Tony; Sharon Shaw Elrod (March 2009). My Dirty Little Secrets - Steroids, Alcohol & God: The Tony Mandarich Story. Modern History Press. ISBN 978-1-932690-78-1.
