= Percy Snow =

American football player (born 1967)

No. 59, 96, 95
- Position: Linebacker

Personal information
- Born: November 5, 1967 (age 59); Canton, Ohio, U.S.
- Listed height: 6 ft 2 in (1.88 m)
- Listed weight: 248 lb (112 kg)

Career information
- High school: McKinley (Canton)
- College: Michigan State (1986–1989)
- NFL draft: 1990: 1st round, 13th overall pick

Career history
- Kansas City Chiefs (1990–1992); Chicago Bears (1993); Rhein Fire (1996)

Awards and highlights
- PFWA All-Rookie Team (1990); Butkus Award (1989); Lombardi Award (1989); Unanimous All-American (1989); 3× First-team All-Big Ten (1987–1989); Michigan State Spartans No. 48 retired

Career NFL statistics
- Interceptions: 1
- Sacks: 2
- Stats at Pro Football Reference
- College Football Hall of Fame

Percy Lee Snow (born November 5, 1967) is an American former professional football player who was a linebacker in the National Football League (NFL). He played college football for the Michigan State Spartans from 1986 to 1989. As a senior, he was a consensus All-American and won both the Butkus Award and the Lombardi Award. He was a first-round draft pick of the Kansas City Chiefs and played three seasons in the National Football League (NFL), and one season in the World League of American Football (WLAF). He was inducted into the College Football Hall of Fame in 2013.

== Early life ==
Snow was born in Canton, Ohio, and attended Canton McKinley High School. He grew up 10 minutes from the Pro Football Hall of Fame where Jack Lambert, Dick Butkus, and Mean Joe Greene were enshrined. Snow recalled: "They were my idols, my boyhood heroes, and I always wanted to be like them."

== Michigan State ==
Snow accepted a scholarship to Michigan State University. He played college football as a middle linebacker for the Michigan State Spartans football teams from 1986 to 1989.

=== 1987 season ===
As a sophomore, Snow led the 1987 Michigan State Spartans football team with 110 tackles, won the Tommy Love Award as the Spartans' most improved player, and helped lead the team to a Big Ten Conference championship and the top-ranked defense in the country against the run (61.5 yards per game).

At the end of the regular season, Snow was selected by the Associated Press as a first-team linebacker on the 1987 All-Big Ten Conference football team. Spartan head coach George Perles said of Snow: "He's as good as there is in the Big Ten. It's not just that he makes the tackles, but when he gets there, he hits with such great thunder, he's going to cause fumbles." Nick Saban, then the Spartans' defensive coordinator, said of Snow: "If there's a key guy in our defense, it's Percy . . . Percy had a hall of a year and made a lot of big plays . . . Players make plays, and Percy is a player."

Snow also helped the Spartans defeat USC in the 1988 Rose Bowl game, recording 17 tackles (15 unassisted) and receiving "Player of the Game" honors.

=== 1988 season ===
As a junior in 1988, Snow recorded 150 tackles, ranking second in the Big Ten. He was selected by both the AP and UPI as a first-team player on the 1988 All-Big Ten Conference football team. He also received first-team honors from The Sporting News on the 1988 All-America college football team. Perles said at the end of the 1988 season: "Percy Snow is as good a linebacker as you will see. You'd have to go a long ways to find someone as good as him. He gets to the ball; he makes things happen, and he plays the pass exceptionally well."

=== 1989 season ===
As a senior in 1989, Snow led the Spartans with 183 tackles—the third consecutive seasons he led the Spartans in tackles. He tallied a career-high 23 tackles against Illinois, and concluded his college career with 473 tackles.

Snow was a consensus selection on the 1989 College Football All-America Team. He also won both the Butkus Award (best college linebacker) and Lombardi Award. He was the first player to win the Butkus and Lombardi Awards in the same season.

=== College statistics ===
Season	Solo tackles	Assisted tackles	Total tackles	Tackles for loss	Sacks	INT
1986	5	5	10	0	0	0
1987	76	51	127	4	2	1
1988	97	67	164	6	0	1
1989	98	74	172	7	2	4
Career	276	197	473	17	4	6

== Professional football ==
Snow was selected by the Kansas City Chiefs in the first round (13 overall pick) of the 1990 NFL draft. As a rookie, he appeared in 15 games for the Chiefs, 14 as a starter, and earned all-rookie honors from the UPI, Pro Football Weekly, and Football Digest.

Prior to the 1991 season, Snow broke an ankle in a motor-scooter accident during training camp. He missed the entire 1991 season as a result of the accident.

Snow returned to the Chiefs in 1992, but never fully recovered from the accident. His career ended after only three active seasons with just one start in his final two. He was arrested in April 1993 by the Kansas City police for allegedly threatening a group of golfers with a gun after a golf ball struck his car. During the 1993 season, he appeared in 10 games as a backup for the Chicago Bears. In 1995, he attempted a comeback with the Cleveland Browns where his former college coach Nick Saban was defensive coordinator.

After leaving the NFL, Snow signed a free-agent contract with the Saskatchewan Roughriders in 1995, and played during the 1996 season for the Rhein Fire in the World League of American Football (WLAF).

== Family, later years, and honors ==
Snow is the older brother of Eric Snow, who played the National Basketball Association (NBA) from 1995 to 2008.

Snow was inducted into the College Football Hall of Fame in 2013. On learning of the honor, Snow called it his "highest individual honor." George Perles recalled: "Offenses simply dreaded playing against him because he didn't just make the tackle; he damaged people. Percy was the hardest-hitting kid that played at Michigan State in many, many years. He was the nucleus of those great defensive units in the late 1980s."

Snow was also inducted into the Michigan State Hall of Fame in 2010, and the Michigan Sports Hall of Fame in 2013. In 2015, the Lansing State Journal rated Snow at No. 8 on its list of the 50 greatest Michigan State football players of all time.

Snow's wife, Tyra, ran track at Michigan State. Their daughters Tyonna and Bry Snow both played basketball at Missouri State.
