= Dave Schnell =

American football player (1966–2011)

No. 11
- Position: Quarterback

Personal information
- Born: July 15, 1966; Elkhart, Indiana, U.S.
- Died: May 22, 2011 (age 44); Elkhart, Indiana, U.S.
- Listed height: 6 ft 3 in (1.91 m)
- Listed weight: 218 lb (99 kg)

Career information
- High school: Elkhart (IN) Central
- College: Indiana
- NFL draft: 1990: undrafted

Career history
- Buffalo Bills (1990)*
- * Offseason or practice squad member only

Awards and highlights
- Second-team All-Big Ten (1988)

David Schnell (July 15, 1966 – May 22, 2011) was an American football player. He attended Elkhart Central High School in Elkhart, Indiana, and he was selected by Sports Illustrated in 1985 as the best high school football player in the United States. He played college football as a quarterback for the Indiana University Hoosiers football team, which won victories in 1987 over both Michigan and Ohio State, becoming the only Indiana quarterback to defeat both teams in the same year. The following year he was selected by the conference coaches as the second-team quarterback on the 1988 All-Big Ten Conference football team.

Schnell was diagnosed with leukemia in 2007 and died from the disease in May 2011 at age 44. He was inducted into the Indiana Football Hall of Fame in May 2010.

An annual golf-outing held in August at Christiana Creek Country Club in Elkhart, Indiana, raises money for the David E. Schnell Scholarship fund which provides local high school seniors with college football scholarships.
