= 1988 All-Big Ten Conference football team =

The 1988 All-Big Ten Conference football team consists of American football players chosen as All-Big Ten Conference players for the 1988 NCAA Division I-A football season. The 1988 Michigan Wolverines football team captured seven of the first-team spots on the All-Big Ten teams selected by the conference coaches for the United Press International. The Iowa Hawkeyes followed with six first-team spots, including quarterback Chuck Hartlieb.

== Offensive selections ==
=== Quarterbacks ===
- Chuck Hartlieb, Iowa (AP-1; UPI-1)
- Jeff George, Illinois (AP-2)
- Dave Schnell, Indiana (UPI-2)

=== Running backs ===
- Anthony Thompson, Indiana (AP-1; UPI-1)
- Tony Boles, Michigan (AP-1; UPI-1)
- Keith Jones, Illinois (AP-2; UPI-2)
- Blake Ezor, Michigan State (AP-2; UPI-2)

=== Centers ===
- John Vitale, Michigan (AP-1; UPI-1)
- Jeff Uhlenhake, Ohio State (AP-2; UPI-2)

=== Guards ===
- Don Shrader, Indiana (AP-1; UPI-1)
- Mike Husar, Michigan (AP-1; UPI-1)
- Bob Kula, Michigan State (AP-2; UPI-2)
- Tim Radtke, Indiana (AP-2; UPI-2)

=== Tackles ===
- Tony Mandarich, Michigan State (AP-1; UPI-1)
- Bob Kratch, Iowa (AP-1; UPI-1)
- Mark McGowan, Illinois (AP-2; UPI-2)
- Kevin Robbins, Michigan State (AP-2)

=== Tight ends ===
- Marv Cook, Iowa (AP-1; UPI-1)
- Tim Jorden, Indiana (AP-2)
- Jeffrey Brown, Michigan (UPI-2)

=== Receivers ===
- Andre Rison, Michigan State (AP-1; UPI-1)
- Deven Harberts, Iowa (AP-1)
- John Kolesar, Michigan (UPI-1)
- Greg McMurtry, Michigan (AP-2; UPI-2)
- Steven Williams, Illinois (AP-2; UPI-2)

== Defensive selections ==
=== Linemen ===
- Morris Gardner, Illinois (AP-1; UPI-1)
- Dave Haight, Iowa (AP-1; UPI-1)
- Mark Messner, Michigan (AP-1; UPI-1)
- Joe Mott, Iowa (AP-1; UPI-1)
- Joe Huff, Indiana (AP-1; UPI-2)
- Travis Davis, Michigan State (AP-2; UPI-2)
- Kurt Larson, Michigan State (AP-2; UPI-2)
- Mel Agee, Illinois (AP-2; UPI-2)
- Jeff Koeppel, Iowa (AP-2)
- Jerrol Williams, Purdue (AP-2)

=== Linebackers ===
- Brad Quast, Iowa (AP-1; UPI-1)
- Percy Snow, Michigan State (AP-1; UPI-1)
- Darrick Brownlow, Illinois (AP-1; UPI-2)
- Willie Bates, Indiana (AP-2; UPI-1)
- J. J. Grant, Michigan (AP-2; UPI-2)
- Darrin Trieb, Purdue (AP-2; UPI-2)

=== Defensive backs ===
- Marc Foster, Purdue (AP-1; UPI-1)
- John Miller, Michigan State (AP-1; UPI-1)
- Glenn Cobb, Illinois (AP-1; UPI-1)
- David Arnold, Michigan (AP-2; UPI-1)
- Zack Dumas, Ohio State (AP-2; UPI-2)
- Ronnie Beeks, Purdue (AP-2)
- Marc Ferry, Indiana (UPI-2)
- Marlon Primous, Illinois (UPI-2)
- Derrick Reed, Michigan State (UPI-2)

== Special teams ==
=== Kickers ===
- Pete Stoyanovich, Indiana (AP-1; UPI-1)
- Mike Gillette, Michigan (AP-2; UPI-1)
- Pat O'Morrow, Ohio State (UPI-2)

=== Punters ===
- Mike Gillette, Michigan (AP-1; UPI-1)
- Ed Sutter, Northwestern (AP-2)
- Brent Herbel, Minnesota (UPI-2)

== Key ==
AP = Associated Press

UPI = United Press International, selected by the Big Ten coaches

Bold = Consensus first-team selection of both the AP and UPI

== See also ==
- 1988 College Football All-America Team
