= Travis Davis (defensive lineman) =

American football player (born 1966)

No. 95
- Position: Nose tackle

Personal information
- Born: May 10, 1966 (age 60); Warren, Ohio, U.S.
- Listed height: 6 ft 2 in (1.88 m)
- Listed weight: 279 lb (127 kg)

Career information
- High school: Warren G. Harding (Warren)
- College: Michigan State (1986–1989)
- NFL draft: 1990: 4th round, 85th overall pick

Career history
- Phoenix Cardinals (1990)*; New Orleans Saints (1990); Indianapolis Colts (1991–1992); Cleveland Browns (1993)*
- * Offseason or practice squad member only

Awards and highlights
- First-team All-Big Ten (1989); 2× Second-team All-Big Ten (1987, 1988)

Career NFL statistics
- Games played: 19
- Games started: 8
- Stats at Pro Football Reference

Travis Neil Davis (born May 10, 1966) is an American former professional football nose tackle who played for the New Orleans Saints and Indianapolis Colts of the National Football League (NFL). He played college football for the Michigan State Spartans.

== Early life ==
Davis was born on May 10, 1966, in Warren, Ohio. He attended Warren G. Harding High School in Warren.

== College career ==
Davis played college football for the Michigan State Spartans from 1986 to 1989 and was a four-year letterman. He had 204 tackles, including 39 for loss, 24 sacks and two interceptions. Davis earned second-team All-Big Ten honors as a sophomore and junior. In 1989, he was selected to the first-team All-Big Ten by both the Associated Press and UPI.

== Professional career ==
=== Phoenix Cardinals ===
Davis was selected in the fourth round, with the 85th overall selection, by the Phoenix Cardinals in the 1990 NFL draft. On July 29, he signed his rookie contract. On September 3, Davis was released after a poor showing in the preseason.

=== New Orleans Saints ===
On October 1, 1990, Davis was signed to the practice squad of the New Orleans Saints. On December 19, he was elevated to the active roster. Davis played in the final two games of the 1990 season and the Wild Card game. On February 1, 1991, he was placed on the Free Agent Plan B list.

=== Indianapolis Colts ===
On March 27, 1991, Davis was signed by the Indianapolis Colts. He played in 16 games and started in eight, recording no statistics. On February 1, 1992, Davis was placed on the Plan B unprotected list. He re-signed with the Colts and was placed on the injured reserve on August 25 with an ankle injury. On November 3, Davis was released by the team.

=== Cleveland Browns ===
On April 20, 1993, Davis was signed by the Cleveland Browns. On August 30, he was released by the team.
