= 1989 Gator Bowl (January) =

1989 Mazda Gator Bowl
Michigan State Spartans	Georgia Bulldogs
(6–4–1)	(8–3)
Big Ten	SEC
27	34
Head coach: George Perles	Head coach: Vince Dooley
	AP / Coaches; 19 / 19
	1	2	3	4	Total
Michigan State	0	7	6	14	27
Georgia	7	10	10	7	34
- Date: January 1, 1989
- Season: 1988
- Stadium: Gator Bowl Stadium
- Location: Jacksonville, Florida
- MVP: QB Wayne Johnson, Georgia; WR Andre Rison, Michigan State
- Referee: Courtney Mauzy (ACC)
- Attendance: 76,236

United States TV coverage
- Network: ESPN
- Announcers: Mike Patrick, Joe Theismann, and Chris Fowler

The 1989 Gator Bowl (January) was a college football postseason bowl game between the Michigan State Spartans and the Georgia Bulldogs.

== Background ==
Michigan State finished 2nd in the Big Ten Conference after a 0–3–1 start ended with six straight victories before being invited to their second straight bowl game and first ever Gator Bowl. Georgia finished 3rd in the Southeastern Conference and first bowl game since 1987.

The game happened immediately after the December 1989 United States cold wave. Workers at Gator Bowl Stadium flushed 503 toilets continuously in the hopes of avoiding water pipe problems but the stadium still suffered $5000 in damages.

== Game summary ==
=== First quarter ===
UGA – Rodney Hampton 6 pass from Wayne Johnson (John Kasay kick), 0:01 left.

=== Second quarter ===
- Georgia – 39 yard field goal from Steve Crumley, 11:00 left.
- Georgia – Rodney Hampton 30 yard touchdown pass from Wayne Johnson (John Kasay kick), 7:06 left.
- Michigan State – Andre Rison 4 yard touchdown pass from Bobby McAllister (John Langeloh kick), 2:55 left.

=== Third quarter ===
- Georgia – Kirk Warner 18 yard touchdown pass from Wayne Johnson (John Kasay kick), 7:48 left
- Michigan State – Andre Rison 55 pass from Bobby McAllister (kick failed), 3:55 left.
- Georgia – 36 yard field goal from Steve Crumley, 2:16 left.

=== Fourth quarter ===
- Michigan State – Blake Ezor 3 yard touchdown run (John Langeloh kick), 14:24 left.
- Georgia – Rodney Hampton 32 yard touchdown run (John Kasay kick), 11:58 left.
- Michigan State – Andre Rison 50 yard touchdown pass from McAllister (Langeloh kick), 3:49 left.

Andre Rison caught 9 pass for 252 yards. Wayne Johnson went 15-of-27 for 227 yards.

== Aftermath ==
This was Vince Dooley's final game with the Bulldogs. The following year, Ray Goff became head coach. The Bulldogs did not return to the Gator Bowl until 2014. As for the Spartans, they reached another bowl game the same year. They have not played in the Gator Bowl since this game.

== Statistics ==
Statistics	Michigan State	Georgia
First downs	22	22
Rushing yards	158	182
Passing yards	288	227
Total yards	446	409
Passes (att-comp-int)	24–14–0	27–15–0
Punts–average	6–42.8	4–34.0
Fumbles–lost	1–0	0–0
Penalties–yards	8–102	5–25
