= Bob Kula =

American football player (born 1967)

No. 64
- Position: Offensive lineman

Personal information
- Born: August 24, 1967 (age 59); Detroit, Michigan, U.S.
- Listed height: 6 ft 4 in (1.93 m)
- Listed weight: 270 lb (122 kg)

Career information
- High school: Brother Rice (Bloomfield Township, Michigan)
- College: Michigan State Spartans (1986–1989)
- NFL draft: 1990: 7th round, 175th overall pick

Career history
- Seattle Seahawks (1990)*; Montreal Machine (1991); Pittsburgh Steelers (1991)*; Montreal Machine (1992)
- * Offseason or practice squad member only

Awards and highlights
- Consensus All-American (1989); Big Ten Offensive Lineman of the Year (1989); First-team All-Big Ten (1989); Second-team All-Big Ten (1988)

Robert Martin Kula (born August 24, 1967) is an American former college football offensive lineman who played for the Michigan State Spartans. He was selected by the Seattle Seahawks in the seventh round of the 1990 NFL draft. He played with the Montreal Machine of the World League of American Football (WLAF).

== Early life ==
Robert Martin Kula was born on August 24, 1967, in Detroit, Michigan. He attended Brother Rice High School in Bloomfield Township, Oakland County, Michigan.

== College career ==
Kula was a four-year letterman for the Michigan State Spartans of Michigan State University from 1986 to 1989. He was a consensus All-American and the Big Ten Offensive Lineman of the Year in 1989 as an offensive tackle. He earned Associated Press (AP) and United Press International (UPI) second-team All-Big Ten Conference honors in 1988, and AP and UPI first-team All-Big Ten honors in 1989.

== Professional career ==
Kula was selected by the Seattle Seahawks in the seventh round, with the 175th overall pick, of the 1990 NFL draft. He signed with the Seahawks in 1990 but was waived later that year on August 28, 1990.

He played in all ten games, starting nine, for the Montreal Machine of the World League of American Football (WLAF) in 1991. The Machine finished the season with a 4–6 record. He was listed as an offensive guard in 1991.

Kula signed with the Pittsburgh Steelers on June 18, 1991. He was waived on August 12, 1991.

He returned to the Machine in 1992 and was listed as a center.
