= Michigan State Spartans football =

American college football program

2026 Michigan State Spartans football team
- First season: 1896; 130 years ago
- Athletic director: Dan Bartholomae
- General manager: Cole Moore
- Head coach: Pat Fitzgerald; 1st season, 3–6 (.333)
- Location: East Lansing, Michigan
- Stadium: Spartan Stadium (capacity: 75,005)
- NCAA division: Division I FBS
- Conference: Big Ten
- Colors: Green and white
- All-time record: 727–502–44 (.588)
- CFP record: 0–1 (.000)
- Bowl record: 14–16 (.467)

National championships
- Claimed: 1951, 1952, 1955, 1957, 1965, 1966

College Football Playoff appearances
- 2015

Conference championships
- MIAA: 1903, 1905, 1907 Big Ten: 1953, 1965, 1966, 1978, 1987, 1990, 2010, 2013, 2015

Division championships
- Big Ten Legends: 2011, 2013 Big Ten East: 2015
- Consensus All-Americans: 33
- Rivalries: Michigan (rivalry); Penn State (rivalry); Notre Dame (rivalry); Indiana (rivalry)

Uniforms
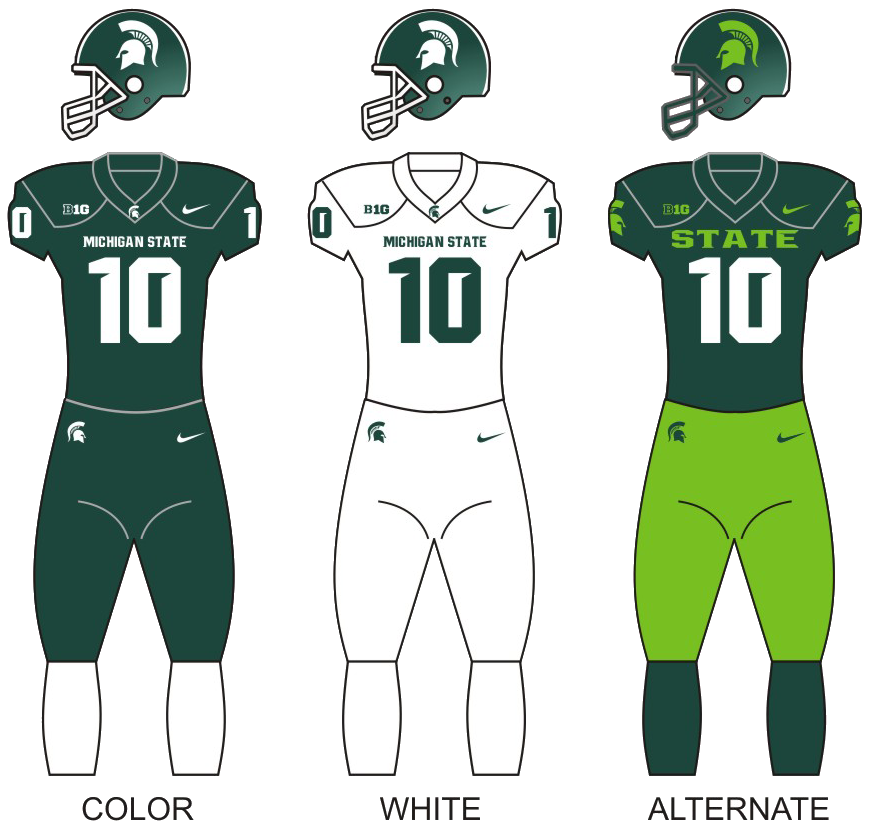
- Fight song: Victory for MSU
- Mascot: Sparty
- Marching band: Spartan Marching Band
- Outfitter: Nike
- Website: msuspartans.com

The Michigan State Spartans football program represents Michigan State University (MSU) in college football at the NCAA Division I Football Bowl Subdivision (FBS) level. The Spartans are members of the Big Ten Conference. Michigan State claims a total of six national championships, including two (1952, 1965) from the major wire-services: AP Poll and/or Coaches' Poll. The Spartans have also won eleven conference championships, with two in the Michigan Intercollegiate Athletic Association and nine in the Big Ten.

Home games of the Spartans are played at Spartan Stadium, which is located on the main university campus. Spartan Stadium is consistently ranked among the NCAA's top 25 in attendance. The Spartans are currently coached by Pat Fitzgerald.

== History ==
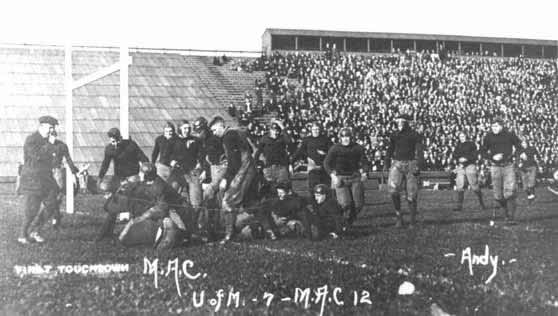
1913 Michigan Agricultural College (MSU) vs Michigan

=== Early years ===
Starting as a club sport in 1885, football gained varsity status in 1896. Early teams at the then Michigan Agricultural College (MAC) competed in the Michigan Intercollegiate Athletic Association (MIAA), which was chartered in 1888 and is the oldest existing collegiate league in the United States. Previously, in 1884, Albion College and Michigan Agricultural had played in the first intercollegiate football game held within the state of Michigan. MIAA's other charter members included Albion, Olivet and Hillsdale Colleges. The association's first season of competitive football was in 1894 which by then also included Eastern Michigan University (then Michigan Normal School) and Alma College; Kalamazoo College was added in 1896. In those early years the MAC Aggies could only accomplish one outright league football championship (1905) and share another with Albion (1903). The first decade of the 20th century generally saw the MIAA and MAC being dominated by either Albion or Olivet Colleges. MSU left the league and became an independent in 1907.

Chester Brewer revolutionized the football program during three different stints as head coach: 1903–10, 1917, and 1919. Considered a defensive genius, his teams posted shutouts in 49 of the 88 games he coached. John Macklin took over as head coach in 1911 and owned a winning percentage of .853 (29–5), which is the highest in Michigan State history.

Jim Crowley, one of Notre Dame's immortal Four Horsemen, served as the head football coach at Michigan State from 1929 to 1933. Charlie Bachman, another Notre Dame alumnus, succeeded Jim Crowley as head football coach at Michigan State, coming to East Lansing after a successful stint at Florida. A teammate of Knute Rockne, Bachman employed the Notre Dame system and forged 10 winning seasons in 13 years.

=== Biggie Munn era (1947–1953) ===
Biggie Munn took over as head coach of Michigan State from Charlie Bachman in 1947. His 1951 and 1952 squads won national championships. Munn retired from coaching in 1953 to assume duties as Michigan State's athletic director, a position he held until 1971. Each year, the Michigan State Spartans football team hands out the "Biggie Munn Award" to the team's most motivational player. MSU's Munn Ice Arena, built in 1974, is named in his honor. Munn was inducted into the College Football Hall of Fame as a coach in 1959, and, in 1961, he became Michigan State's first inductee into the Michigan Sports Hall of Fame. He authored the coaching textbook Michigan State Multiple Offense in 1953.

- 1947–1950 In 1947, Munn and the Michigan State administration, led by university president John A. Hannah, approached Notre Dame president Father Cavanaugh to have his Fighting Irish play the Spartans for the first time since 1921. MSU initially offered to let Notre Dame take 80 percent of the gate, but Cavanaugh insisted they split the receipts down the middle. Munn was the only coach to beat Notre Dame head coach Frank Leahy three years in a row (1950–52). Starting with a 33–14 win over William & Mary in East Lansing on October 14, 1950, Biggie Munn started his historic 28-game winning streak.
- 1951 The 1951 team went undefeated and were elected the National Champions by the Helms Athletic Foundation; however, the rest of the polls voted for the Tennessee Volunteers, who lost in the Sugar Bowl to the Maryland Terrapins, but postseason games did not count at the time.
- 1952 The 1952 squad continued Munn's undefeated streak going 9–0. Michigan State won a national championship for the second year in a row and for the first time in school history were voted No. 1 in both the AP and Coaches' polls. Munn was named the AFCA Coach of the Year, coaching MSU to 9–0 record and a national championship.
- 1953 In 1953, Michigan State's first year of conference play in the Big Ten, the Spartans shared the conference title with Illinois and went to the Rose Bowl, where they beat UCLA, 28–20. On October 24, 1953, Purdue upset the Spartans 6–0, ending Munn's 28-game winning streak. The Spartans won the first ever Paul Bunyan Trophy after beating rival Michigan 14–6 in East Lansing.

Shortly after the Rose Bowl victory, MSU's athletic director, Ralph H. Young retired. Munn stepped down from coaching to assume duties as athletic director and remained in that position until 1971. Munn named his assistant, Duffy Daugherty, as his successor to helm the football team. During his tenure as Michigan State's head football coach, Munn tutored 17 All-Americans. His teams have retained the school's top four season marks for rushing-yards-per-game: 1948 (304.5 yards/game), 1951 (293.9 yards), 1952 (272.4), and 1950 (269.3). Munn was inducted into the College Football Hall of Fame in 1959.

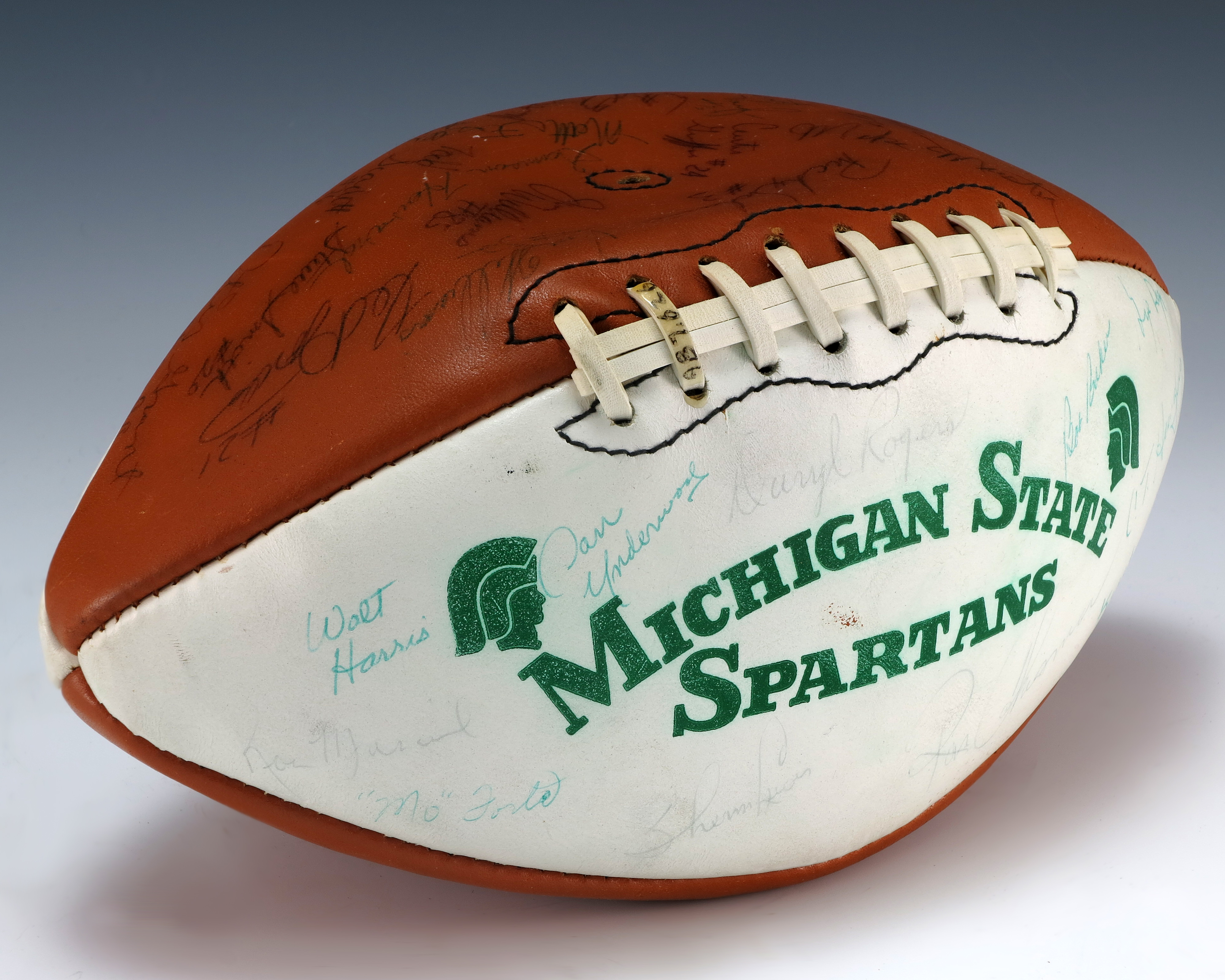
A football signed by the 1979 Michigan State Spartans football team

During the 1950s when Detroit was known as the world's leading automobile manufacturer, Michigan State was often referred to as the nation's "football factory". During this era, the Spartans produced great players such as Lynn Chandnois, Dorne Dibble, Don McAulliffe, Tom Yewcic, Sonny Grandelius, Bob Carey, Don Coleman, Earl Morrall and Dean Look.

=== Duffy Daugherty era (1954–1972) ===
Duffy Daugherty replaced Munn in December 1953, following Munn's retirement to become Michigan State's athletic director. Daugherty would serve as the head coach at Michigan State University from 1954 to 1972, where he compiled a career record of 109–69–5. Duffy's 1965 and 1966 teams won national championships. Duffy's tenure of 19 seasons at the helm of the Michigan State Spartans football team is the longest of any head coach in the program's history. He was inducted into the College Football Hall of Fame in 1984.

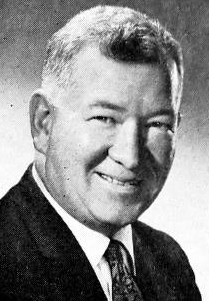
Coach Duffy Daugherty

- 1954–1964 After compiling a disappointing 3–6 record in Daugherty's first season in 1954, the Spartans improved and finished second in the Big Ten behind Ohio State in 1955 with an 8–1 record in the regular season. Michigan State received the conference's invitation to the 1956 Rose Bowl instead of the Buckeyes due to the conference's prohibition against consecutive trips to the Rose Bowl. In Pasadena, the Spartans defeated UCLA, 17–14, for their second bowl win in school history. From 1956 to 1964, Daugherty's Michigan State teams were usually good, three times placing second in Big Ten, but never captured the conference crown. The Spartans did, however, beat Notre Dame eight straight times between 1955 and 1963, a feat matched only by Michigan (1887–1908) and USC (2002–2009). On November 5, 1964, the NCAA found Daugherty's program at Michigan State guilty of NCAA infractions prior to and during the 1957, 1958, and 1959 seasons. Daughtery's football program was put on probation for three years following the 1964 decision.
- 1965–1966 The 1965 and 1966 seasons were the high points in Daugherty's coaching tenure, if not in the history of Michigan State football. The 1965 team finished the regular season 10–0 and ranked first in the country, but was upset by UCLA in the 1966 Rose Bowl, 14–12. Nevertheless, Michigan State was named national champions by the UPI and the National Football Foundation. The 1966 team began the season 9–0 and headed into their final game ranked No. 2 against No. 1 Notre Dame at Spartan Stadium on November 19. The No. 1 vs. No. 2 showdown, dubbed "The Game of the Century" by national media, ended in a 10–10 tie. The Spartans did not play in a bowl game following the 1966 season due to Big Ten rules in place at the time that prohibited its teams from playing in the Rose Bowl in consecutive years and barred participation in any other bowl. Notre Dame and Michigan State were declared co-national champions of the 1966 season as a result of the 10–10 tie.
- 1967–1972 Beginning with the 1967 season, there was a decline in the Spartans football program under Duffy. Daugherty's teams in the late 60s and early 70s consistently hovered around the .500 mark, with only his 1971 squad finishing with a winning record (6–5). Under pressure from MSU's administration, Daugherty retired after the 1972 season and was succeeded as head coach by Denny Stolz.

During Daugherty's time in East Lansing, he recruited and coached some of the best players in Michigan State's history, including Herb Adderley, Brad Van Pelt, Bubba Smith, George Webster, Joe DeLamielleure, and Billy Joe DuPree who is recognized as the greatest tight end in Michigan State history. He was one of the first college football coaches to field a racially integrated team.

=== George Perles era (1983–1994) ===
After returning from US Army active duty, George Perles returned to Michigan, where he enrolled at Michigan State University and played football under legendary coach Duffy Daugherty. Perles played the 1958 season before his playing career was cut short by a knee injury. Perles then started his football coaching career as a graduate assistant at Michigan State before moving on to the high school ranks in Chicago and Detroit, where his St. Ambrose High School team won their first Detroit City League Championship in 1961. Perles returned to Michigan State as defensive line coach under his mentor, Daugherty.

In 1972, Chuck Noll, head coach of the Pittsburgh Steelers, offered Perles the position of defensive line coach. In Perles' first season, the Steelers made the NFL playoffs for the second time in franchise history, the first since 1947, losing to the Miami Dolphins in the AFC Championship Game. In 1974, the Steelers won the first of six consecutive AFC Central division championships and also their first Super Bowl. Perles became the defensive coordinator for the Steelers in 1978 and then assistant head coach under Noll in 1979. During Perles' ten years with Pittsburgh (1972–1981), the Steelers won a then-record four Super Bowls and became known as the team of the decade for the 1970s, largely on the back of their "Stunt 4-3" defense designed by Perles.

Perles returned to Michigan State University on December 3, 1982. In 12 years, he led the Spartans to two Big Ten Conference titles, seven bowl games and a victory in the 1988 Rose Bowl. The 1987 season marked the Spartans' last outright Big Ten title until 2013. During the 1987 season Perles and Michigan State beat Southern California twice in the same season, once in the regular season and one in the Rose Bowl.

During 1994–1995, an extensive external investigation conducted by the law firm of Bond, Schoeneck & King, PLLC. uncovered various infractions including grade tampering by an athletic department administrator. MSU president M. Peter McPherson fired Perles before the end of the 1994 season, and ordered the Spartans to forfeit their five wins for that season. Perles was found "not culpable". Many fans and alumni believed he was treated unfairly. He later went on to be the founder of The Little Caesars Pizza Bowl and served on the MSU board of trustees. Perles died in January 2020.

=== Nick Saban era (1995–1999) ===
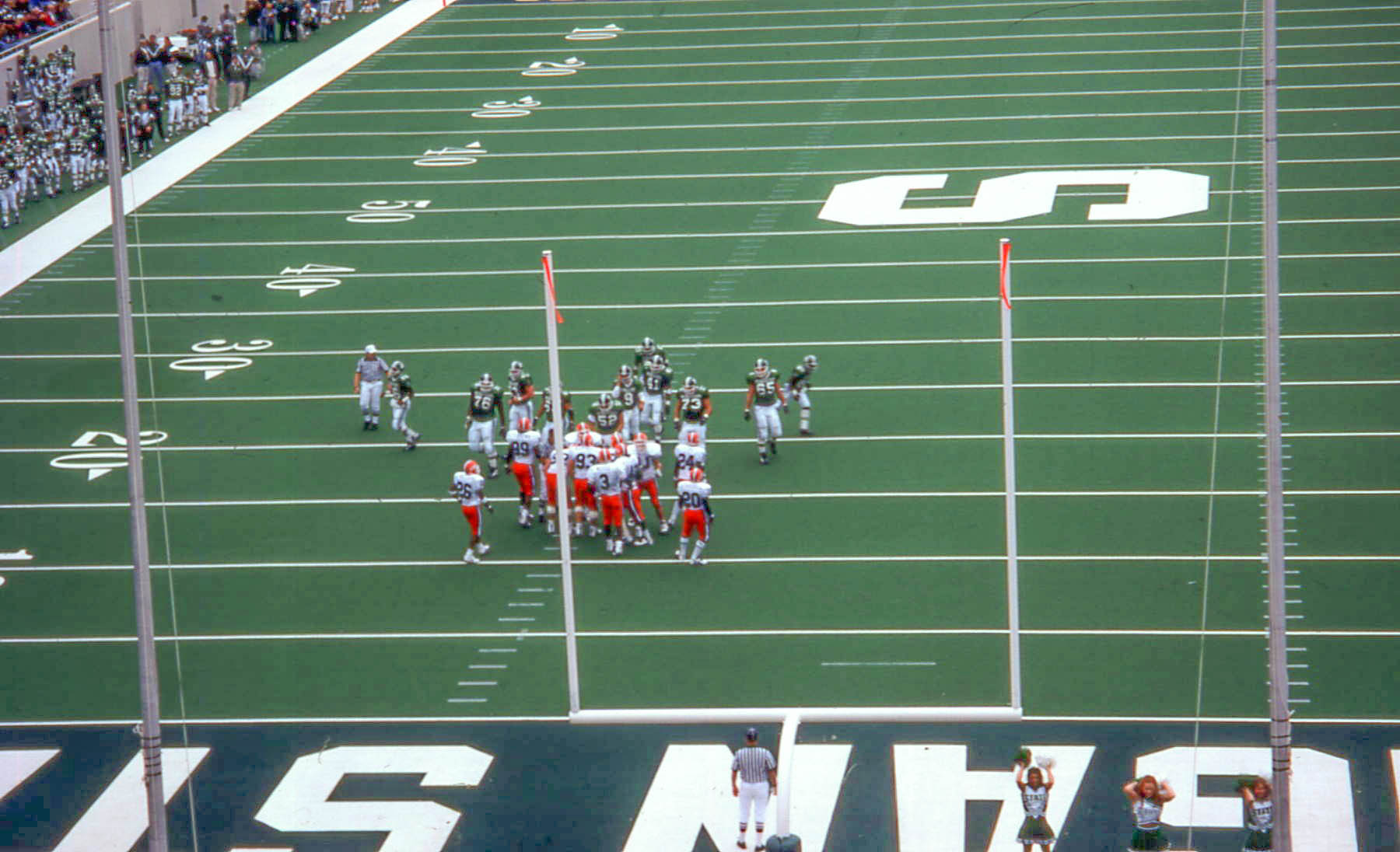
Michigan State playing Illinois in an October 1996 game at Spartan Stadium

When Nick Saban arrived in East Lansing, Michigan, prior to the 1995 season, MSU had not had a winning season since 1990, and the team was sanctioned by the NCAA for recruiting violations committed under his predecessor and former mentor, George Perles.

- 1995–1997 – Beginning in 1995, Saban moderately improved MSU's fortunes, taking the Spartans to minor bowl games (all of which they lost by double-digit margins) in each of his first three seasons. From 1995 to 1997, Michigan State finished 6-5-1, 6–6, and 7–5. In comparison, MSU had finished 5–6, 6–6 and 5–6 (prior to NCAA forfeits) in 1992–1994.
- 1998 – On November 7, 1998, the Spartans upset the No. 1 ranked Ohio State 28–24 at Ohio Stadium. However, even after the upset and an early-season rout of then-highly ranked Notre Dame the Spartans finished 6–6, including three last-minute losses featuring turnovers, defensive lapses, and special-teams misplays, and failed to earn a bowl invitation.
- 1999 – Saban led the Spartans to a 9–2 season that included wins over Notre Dame, Michigan, Ohio State, and Penn State. Conversely, the two losses were routs at the hands of Purdue and Wisconsin. Following the final regular-season game against Penn State, Saban abruptly resigned to accept the head coaching position with LSU. Saban's assistant head coach and successor, Bobby Williams, then coached MSU to a Citrus Bowl victory over Florida, giving the Spartans an overall record of 10–2 for the 1999 season. It would be the best season in terms of wins for the Spartans since 1965, and it would see the Spartans reach their highest ranking since the 1966 team. Future former NFL Head Coach Josh McDaniels served as a graduate assistant on Saban's 1999 coaching staff.

Saban never won a bowl game in his tenure at Michigan State, going 0–3 and losing those bowl contests by a combined 85 points.

=== Mark Dantonio era (2006–2019) ===
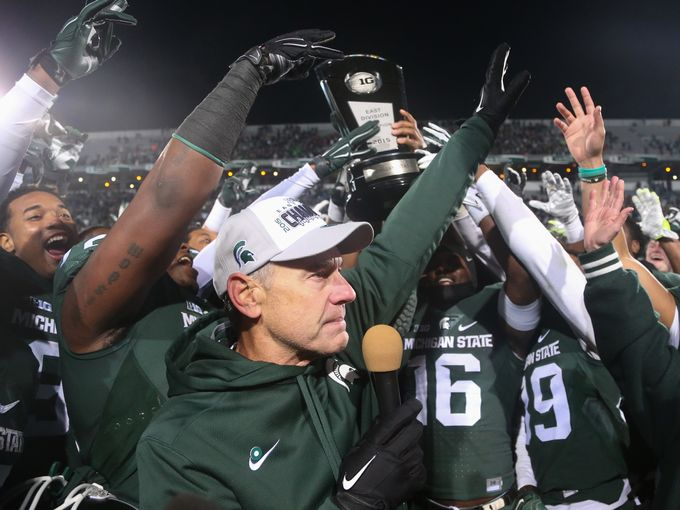
Coach Mark Dantonio

On November 27, 2006, Mark Dantonio was hired from the University of Cincinnati to become Michigan State's new football head coach. Dantonio served as an assistant coach at MSU from 1995 to 2000 and was Ohio State's defensive coordinator during their 2002 national championship season. Dantonio was also an assistant at Kansas and Youngstown State University. In 2010, Dantonio led MSU to earn a share of the Big Ten Championship after finishing the year in a three-way tie with Ohio State and Wisconsin. His 2011 team won their division and appeared in the inaugural Big Ten Football Championship Game. His Spartans would win outright Big Ten Championships in 2013 and 2015 with victories in the 2013 and 2015 Championship Games. He has compiled an 8–4 record against the arch-rival Michigan. Michigan State's streak of four wins in a row, from the 2008 season through 2011, tied Michigan State's best in the rivalry. Dantonio's record also includes a 4–4 mark for the Megaphone Trophy, which goes to the winner of the Notre Dame rivalry game. Since leading Michigan State to a College Football Playoff berth in 2015, Dantonio compiled a 24–23 (15–18 in conference games) record.

He is considered a defensive-minded coach and has been on the coaching staffs of Glen Mason, Jim Tressel and Nick Saban. On September 21, 2019, Dantonio became Michigan State's winningest coach with a 31–10 victory over Northwestern that gave him his 110th win at the program and moved him past Duffy Daugherty. As of February 2018, his contract was set to run through 2024. Dantonio made approximately $4.3 million annually. On February 4, 2020, Dantonio announced that he would be stepping down as head coach and planned to move into a different role in the athletic department.

=== Mel Tucker era (2020–2023) ===
On February 12, 2020, Mel Tucker was hired from the University of Colorado to become Michigan State's new football head coach. Tucker served as a graduate assistant at MSU from 1997 to 1998, and also had stops as Ohio State's co-defensive coordinator in 2004, assistant head coach at Alabama in 2015, as well as the defensive coordinator for Georgia from 2016 to 2018. He was also an assistant at Miami (OH) and LSU. Tucker also served as defensive coordinator for the Cleveland Browns, Chicago Bears, and the Jacksonville Jaguars of the NFL, and he also served as interim head coach of the Jaguars in 2011.

In his first season, the COVID-19 shortened 2020 season, the Spartans finished the season 2–5 with a win over rival Michigan.

In 2021, helped by the transfer into the program of running back Kenneth Walker III, the Spartans again beat Michigan and started the season 8–0 and were ranked third in the initial College Football Playoff rankings. Losses at Purdue and Ohio State dropped the Spartans out of playoff consideration, but they finished the regular season 10–2. MSU was selected to participate in the Peach Bowl on December 30, 2021 the school's first New Year's Six bowl game since 2015. The Spartans defeated Pittsburgh 31–21 in the Peach Bowl. Walker was a consensus All-American and became the first Spartan to win the Walter Camp and Doak Walker awards. Walker led the Spartans and was second in the country with 1,636 rushing yards. MSU had the nation's worst passing defense, allowing 337.7 yards per game.

On November 24, 2021, the school announced that Tucker had signed a 10-year, $95 million contract extension, allegedly all through donor money, amid speculations of Tucker being sought after for other college and NFL coaching positions.

Looking to build on the success of the 2021 season, the Spartans opened the 2022 season ranked No. 15 in the AP poll. After winning the first two games of the season, the Spartans lost four consecutive games before a double-overtime victory over Wisconsin. However, the Spartans lost three of their final five games, including to rival Michigan, to end the season. They finished the season 5–7, 3–6 in Big Ten play to finish in fifth place in the East division. They failed to qualify for a bowl game for the second time in three years.

On September 10, 2023, after the first two games of the 2023 season, Mel Tucker was suspended without pay pending an investigation of allegations of sexual misconduct. On September 27, the school fired Tucker for cause.

Defensive backs coach Harlon Barnett was named the team's interim coach.

=== Jonathan Smith era (2023–2025) ===
Michigan State announced it had hired Oregon State head coach Jonathan Smith on Nov. 25, 2023. Smith was fired on Nov. 30, 2025 after compiling an overall record of 9-15 over two seasons.

=== Pat Fitzgerald era (2025–present) ===
After the firing of Jonathan Smith, Pat Fitzgerald from Northwestern University was appointed head coach on December 1, 2025.

== Conference affiliations ==
- Michigan Intercollegiate Athletic Association (1888–1907)
- Independent (1908–1952)
- Big Ten Conference (1953–present)

== Championships ==
=== National championships ===
Michigan State has won six national championships from NCAA-designated major selectors, including two (1952, 1965) from the major wire-service: AP Poll and/or Coaches' Poll. Michigan State claims all six championships.

Year	Coach	Selectors	Record	Bowl	Result	Final AP	Final Coaches
1951	Biggie Munn	Billingsley, Helms, Poling	9–0			No. 2	No. 2
1952	Biggie Munn	AP, Boand, DeVold, Dunkel, Football Research, Helms, Litkenhous, NCF, Sagarin, UPI Coaches , Williamson	9–0			No. 1	No. 1
1955	Duffy Daugherty	Boand	9–1	Rose	W 17–14	No. 2	No. 2
1957	Duffy Daugherty	Dunkel	8–1			No. 3	No. 3
1965	Duffy Daugherty	Berryman, Billingsley, DeVold, Dunkel, FB News, FW, Helms, Litkenhous, NFF, Poling, Sagarin, Sagarin (ELO-Chess), UPI Coaches	10–1	Rose	L 12–14	No. 2	No. 1
1966	Duffy Daugherty	Football Research, Helms, NFF, Poling	9–0–1			No. 2	No. 2

=== Conference championships ===
Michigan State has won 12 conference championships, six outright and five shared.

Year	Conference	Coach	Overall record	Conference record
1903	MIAA	Chester Brewer	6–1–1	3–1
1905†	MIAA	Chester Brewer	9–2	4–0
1907	MIAA	Chester Brewer	4–2–1	1–0–1
1953†	Big Ten	Biggie Munn	9–1	5–1
1965	Big Ten	Duffy Daugherty	10–1	7–0
1966	Big Ten	Duffy Daugherty	9–0–1	7–0
1978†	Big Ten	Darryl Rogers	8–3	7–1
1987	Big Ten	George Perles	9–2–1	7–0–1
1990†	Big Ten	George Perles	8–3–1	6–2
2010†	Big Ten	Mark Dantonio	11–2	7–1
2013	Big Ten	Mark Dantonio	13–1	8–0
2015	Big Ten	Mark Dantonio	12–2	7–1

† Co-champions

=== Division championships ===
Year	Division	Coach	Opponent	CG result
2011	Big Ten Legends	Mark Dantonio	Wisconsin	L, 39–42
2013	Big Ten Legends	Mark Dantonio	Ohio State	W, 34–24
2015	Big Ten East	Mark Dantonio	Iowa	W, 16–13

† Co-champions

== Bowl games ==
Michigan State has appeared in 30 bowl games, garnering a 14–16 record.

Season	Coach	Bowl	Opponent	Result
1937	Charlie Bachman	Orange Bowl	Auburn	L 0–6
1953	Biggie Munn	Rose Bowl	UCLA	W 28–20
1955	Duffy Daugherty	Rose Bowl	UCLA	W 17–14
1965	Duffy Daugherty	Rose Bowl	UCLA	L 12–14
1984	George Perles	Cherry Bowl	Army	L 6–10
1985	George Perles	Hall of Fame Classic	Georgia Tech	L 14–17
1987	George Perles	Rose Bowl	USC	W 20–17
1988	George Perles	Gator Bowl	Georgia	L 27–34
1989	George Perles	Aloha Bowl	Hawaii	W 33–13
1990	George Perles	John Hancock Bowl	USC	W 17–16
1993	George Perles	Liberty Bowl	Louisville	L 7–18
1995	Nick Saban	Independence Bowl	LSU	L 26–45
1996	Nick Saban	Sun Bowl	Stanford	L 0–38
1997	Nick Saban	Aloha Bowl	Washington	L 23–51
1999	Bobby Williams	Florida Citrus Bowl	Florida	W 37–34
2001	Bobby Williams	Silicon Valley Football Classic	Fresno State	W 44–35
2003	John L. Smith	Alamo Bowl	Nebraska	L 3–17
2007	Mark Dantonio	Champs Sports Bowl	Boston College	L 21–24
2008	Mark Dantonio	Capital One Bowl	Georgia	L 12–24
2009	Mark Dantonio	Alamo Bowl	Texas Tech	L 31–41
2010	Mark Dantonio	Capital One Bowl	Alabama	L 7–49
2011	Mark Dantonio	Outback Bowl	Georgia	W 33–30 ^{3OT}
2012	Mark Dantonio	Buffalo Wild Wings Bowl	TCU	W 17–16
2013	Mark Dantonio	Rose Bowl †	Stanford	W 24–20
2014	Mark Dantonio	Cotton Bowl Classic †	Baylor	W 42–41
2015	Mark Dantonio	Cotton Bowl Classic (CFP Semifinal) †	Alabama	L 0–38
2017	Mark Dantonio	Holiday Bowl	Washington State	W 42–17
2018	Mark Dantonio	Redbox Bowl	Oregon	L 6–7
2019	Mark Dantonio	Pinstripe Bowl	Wake Forest	W 27–21
2021	Mel Tucker	Peach Bowl †	Pittsburgh	W 31–21

† CFP/New Year's Six/BCS game

== Head coaches ==
List of Michigan State head coaches. Mark Dantonio is Michigan State's all-time winningest coach with 114 wins. Duffy Daugherty was the longest tenured coach at 19 years. Daugherty won four national titles while Biggie Munn won two; no other MSU coach has won a national title. Munn leads coaches since 1940 with a .846 winning percentage.

Coach	Years	Seasons	Record	Pct.	Conf. record	Pct.	Div. titles	Conf. titles	Bowl games	National titles	Conference
No coach	1896	1	1–2–1	.375	0–1	.000	0	0	0	0	MIAA
Henry Keep	1897–1898	2	8–5–1	.607	5–2–1	.688	0	0	0	0	MIAA
Charles Bemies	1899–1900	2	3–7–1	.318	1–3	.250	0	0	0	0	MIAA
George Denman	1901–1902	2	7–9–1	.441	5–4–1	.550	0	0	0	0	MIAA
Chester Brewer	1903–1910, 1917, 1919	10	58–23–7	.699	21–3–2	.846	0	3	0	0	Left MIAA after 1907
John Macklin	1911–1915	5	29–5	.853	n/a	n/a	n/a	n/a	0	0	Independent
Dutch Sommer	1916	1	4–2–1	.643	n/a	n/a	n/a	n/a	0	0	Independent
George Gauthier	1918	1	4–3	.571	n/a	n/a	n/a	n/a	0	0	Independent
George Clark	1920	1	4–6	.400	n/a	n/a	n/a	n/a	0	0	Independent
Albert Barron	1921–1922	2	6–10–2	.389	n/a	n/a	n/a	n/a	0	0	Independent
Ralph H. Young	1923–1927	5	18–22–1	.451	n/a	n/a	n/a	n/a	n/a	0	Independent
Harry Kipke	1928	1	3–4–1	.438	n/a	n/a	n/a	n/a	0	0	Independent
Jim Crowley	1929–1932	4	22–8–3	.712	n/a	n/a	n/a	n/a	0	0	Independent
Charlie Bachman	1933–1942, 1944–1946	13	70–34–10	.658	n/a	n/a	n/a	n/a	1	0	Independent
Biggie Munn	1947–1953	7	54–9–2	.846	5–1	.833	n/a	1	1	2	Joined Big Ten in 1953
Duffy Daugherty	1954–1972	19	109–69–5	.609	72–50–3	.588	n/a	2	2	4	Big Ten
Denny Stolz	1973–1975	3	19–13–1	.591	14–9–1	.604	n/a	0	0	0	Big Ten
Darryl Rogers	1976–1979	4	24–18–2	.568	19–12–1	.609	n/a	1	0	0	Big Ten
Muddy Waters	1980–1982	3	10–23	.303	8–18	.308	n/a	0	0	0	Big Ten
George Perles	1983–1994	12	68–67–4	.504	53–42–2	.557	n/a	2	7	0	Big Ten
Nick Saban	1995–1999	5	34–24–1	.585	23–16–1	.588	n/a	0	3	0	Big Ten
Bobby Williams	2000–2002	> 2	16–17	.469	6–15	.286	n/a	0	2	0	Big Ten
Morris Watts	2002	< 1	1–2	.333	1–2	.333	n/a	0	0	0	Big Ten
John L. Smith	2003-2006	4	22–26	.458	12–20	.375	n/a	0	1	0	Big Ten
Mark Dantonio	2007–2019	13	114–57	.667	69–39	.639	3*	3	12	0	Big Ten
Mel Tucker	2020–2023	3	18–14	.563	12–13	.480	0	0	1	0	Big Ten
Harlon Barnett (Interim)	2023	< 1	2–8	.200	2–7	.222	0	0	0	0	Big Ten
Jonathan Smith	2024–2025	2	4-15	.211	1-14	.067	0	0	0	0	Big Ten
Pat Fitzgerald	2026–present	0	0–0	–	0–0	–	0	0	0	0	Big Ten
Totals	1896–present	126	734–490–44	.596	327–251–12	.564	3	12	30	6	

* The Big Ten split into the Leaders and Legends Divisions with the addition of Nebraska for the 2011 season. Michigan State played in the Legends Division from 2011 to 2013. In 2014, with the addition of Maryland and Rutgers, the divisions were realigned and Michigan State played in the East Division. In 2024, the Big Ten added Oregon, UCLA, USC, and Washington and divisions were eliminated.

== Facilities ==
=== Spartan Stadium ===
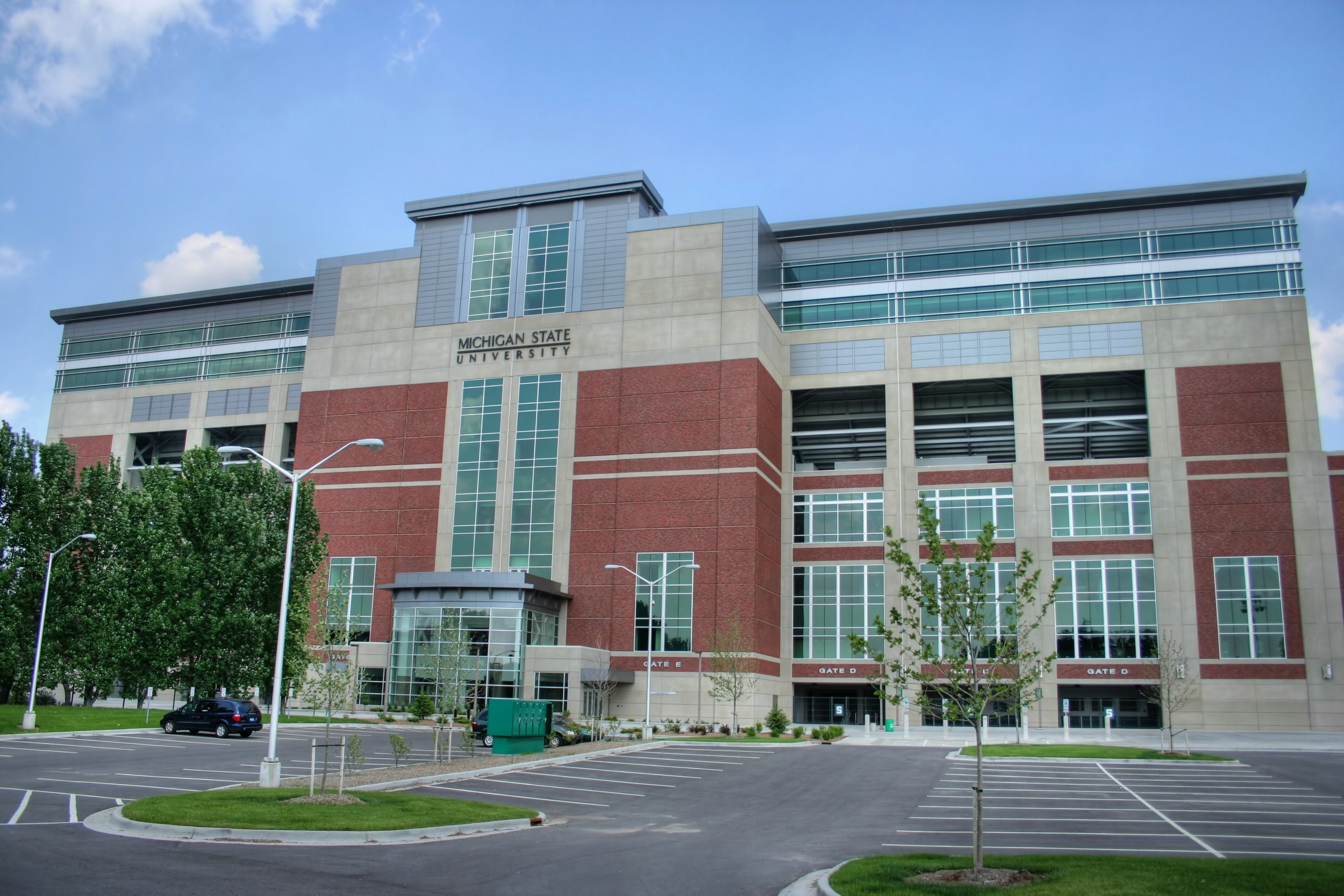
Spartan Stadium hosts varsity football games and other events.

Until the 1920s, the Spartans played on Old College Field just northwest of the current stadium. In the early 1920s school officials voted to construct a new stadium. The new College Field was ready in the fall of 1923 with a capacity of 14,000. In 1935 the seating capacity was increased to 26,000 and the facility was dedicated as Macklin Field. By 1957, upper decks were added to the east and west sides, boosting the capacity to 76,000. That same season Michigan State dropped the name Macklin Stadium in favor of the current name, Spartan Stadium.

In 2005 the university finished a new $64 million expansion project to Spartan Stadium. It featured the addition of nearly 3,000 club seats in the "Spartan Club", 24 suites and a 193-seat press box, bringing the current stadium capacity to 75,005. The original World War II-era terracotta cast of "The Spartan" statue was moved indoors to the atrium of the new structure to protect it from the elements and occasional vandalism, and a new bronze cast was made for outdoors. The 200,000-square-foot (19,000 m^{2}) addition also houses the MSU Alumni Office, University Development, Career Services and other units.

The stadium boasts a capacity of 75,005, making it the Big Ten's 6th largest stadium and 23rd largest college football stadium in the country. In 2010 Spartan Stadium had the 19th highest attendance in NCAA Division I FBS. Crowd noise in the stadium gets so loud that Stanley Kubrick's Spartacus (1960) uses a recording of the crowd noise during the 1959 Michigan State-Notre Dame game.

For the 2007 season, the student section held approximately 13,000 fans. Like the basketball student section (the Izzone), the Michigan State Student Alumni Foundation used to oversee a subgroup in the football student section named "Corner Blitz". When head coach Mark Dantonio took over the football program in 2006, "Corner Blitz" was united with the normal student section. The entire student section now receives a special T-shirt which is voted on annually.

Three new video boards were installed prior to the 2012 season. The larger South LED board measures 47.2 feet (14.4 m) high by 114.8 feet (35.0 m) wide for a total of 5,412 square feet (502.8 m^{2}). The two North LED boards measure 31.5 feet (9.6 m) high by 52.5 feet (16.0 m) wide for a total of 1,653.75 square feet (153.638 m^{2}) each. When combined, the three boards measure 8,719.5 square feet (810.07 m^{2}), making it the largest combined board system in the country. Also, the stadium includes a 10 feet (3.0 m) high by 450 feet (140 m) wide ribbon video board along the top of the bleachers in the north endzone, which adds another 4,500 square feet (420 m^{2}) to make a grand total of 13,219.5 square feet (1,228.13 m^{2}).

=== Duffy Daugherty Building / Skandalaris Center ===
In 2007 Michigan State expanded its Duffy Daugherty Football Building with a $15 million expansion and renovation project. The face-lift started with construction of the 25,000-square-foot (2,300 m^{2}) Skandalaris Football Center that features new team, staff and position meeting rooms, coaches' offices, MSU football Players Lounge and The Demmer Family Hall of History. MSU alumni Robert and Julie Skandalaris of Bloomfield Hills, Mich., donated $5 million as the lead gift for the $15 million project. In 2008, weight room was increased in size from 9,000 to 16,500 square feet (1,530 m^{2}) at a cost of $2 million. The complex includes a 86,000-square-foot (8,000 m^{2}) indoor practice facility with a full in-door football field, two outdoor practice football fields and a training room with a rehab and hydrotherapy section. Graphics in the space were provided by Ohio-based environmental designer, Ze Design.

== Rivalries ==
=== Michigan ===
The Paul Bunyan-Governor of Michigan Trophy is a college rivalry trophy awarded to the winner of the annual football game between Michigan and Michigan State. Michigan leads the trophy series 40-29-2 through the 2023 season.

=== Notre Dame ===
The Megaphone Trophy is awarded each year to the winner of the football game between Notre Dame and Michigan State. The rivalry includes games such as a 1966 "Game of the Century", often considered as one of the greatest college football games ever played. Notre Dame leads the series 50–28–1 through the 2026 season. The teams are next scheduled to play in 2027.

=== Indiana ===
The Old Brass Spittoon is presented to the winner of the Indiana–Michigan State football game and was first presented in 1950. After facing each other in one of the so-called protected cross-division rivalry games from 2011 to 2013, MSU and Indiana continue to face off each year as members of the Big Ten East division. Michigan State holds the trophy, and MSU leads the all-time series 50–18–2 through 2023.

=== Penn State ===
Michigan State and Penn State play for the Land Grant Trophy, so named because Penn State University and Michigan State University are the nation's oldest land-grant universities as founded in 1855. When Penn State joined the Big Ten Conference in 1993, the Nittany Lions and Spartans have played each other for the trophy in the last week of conference play until the 2010 season. The trophy, designed by former Michigan State coach George Perles, features pictures of Penn State's Old Main and Michigan State's Beaumont Tower. After spending the 2011 to 2013 seasons in opposite Big Ten conference divisions, MSU and PSU resumed playing each other annually for the trophy in 2014. Penn State currently leads the series 19-18-1 through the 2023 season.

== Game of the Century ==
The "Game of the Century" (1966 version)
Notre Dame Fighting Irish	Michigan State Spartans
(8–0)	(9–0)
10	10
Head coach: Ara Parseghian	Head coach: Duffy Daugherty
AP / Coaches; 1 / 1	AP / Coaches; 2 / 2
	1	2	3	4	Total
Notre Dame	0	7	0	3	10
Michigan State	7	3	0	0	10
- Date: November 19, 1966
- Season: 1966
- Stadium: Spartan Stadium
- Location: East Lansing, Michigan

The 1966 Michigan State vs. Notre Dame football game ("The Game of the Century") remains one of the greatest, and most controversial, games in college football history. The game was played in Michigan State's Spartan Stadium on November 19, 1966. Michigan State entered the contest 9–0 and ranked No. 2, while Notre Dame entered the contest 8–0 and ranked No. 1. Notre Dame elected not to try for the end zone on the final series, thus the game ended in a 10–10 tie with both schools recording national championships.

Irish quarterback Terry Hanratty was knocked out after getting sacked in the first quarter by Spartan defensive lineman Bubba Smith. Starting Notre Dame running back Nick Eddy was out entirely after hurting his shoulder. Michigan State held a 10–0 lead by early in the second quarter. But the Irish came back, scoring a touchdown right after State's field goal and tied the game on the first play of the fourth quarter. Notre Dame had the ball on its own 30-yard line with 1:10 to go, needing about 40 yards for a game-winning field goal. But Notre Dame coach Ara Parseghian chose to run the clock out, not wanting to risk a turnover, preserving the tie and Notre Dame's No. 1 ranking. The game ended in a 10–10 tie.

Notre Dame beat Rose Bowl bound USC 51–0 in Los Angeles the next week, completing an undefeated regular season and moving to No. 1 in both polls. The Irish did not accept bowl bids until 1969, and Michigan State was the victim of a pair of Big Ten rules that would be rescinded a few years later: The same school could not represent the league in the Rose Bowl in back-to-back seasons, and only the league Champions could accept a bowl bid, unless they refused the Rose Bowl bid or, because it was on probation, were prohibited from accepting the bid, which, in either case, would then go to the second-place team. So despite being Big Ten Champions and undefeated in the regular season, in each case for two seasons in a row, the Spartans could not play in the Rose Bowl.

For nearly 50 years, Parseghian has defended his end-of-the-game strategy, which left fans feeling disappointed at the game not having some sort of resolution. College football expert Dan Jenkins lead off his article for Sports Illustrated by saying Parseghian chose to "Tie one for the Gipper." Others chided Notre Dame by calling them the "Tying Irish" instead of the "Fighting Irish".

The game was not shown live on national TV. Each team was allotted one national television appearance and two regional television appearances each season. Notre Dame had used their national TV slot in the season opening game against Purdue. ABC executives did not even want to show the game anywhere but the regional area, but pressure from the West Coast and the South (to the tune of 50,000 letters) made ABC air the game on tape delay.

The Sporting News named the 1966 Fighting Irish and 1965–66 Spartans the 11th and 13th greatest teams of the 20th century respectively.

== Individual awards and honors ==
=== National award winners ===
==== Players ====
- Maxwell Award

1972: Brad Van Pelt

- Fred Biletnikoff Award

2002: Charles Rogers

- Paul Warfield Trophy

2002: Charles Rogers

- Outland Trophy

1949: Ed Bagdon

- UPI Lineman of the Year

1965: Bubba Smith

- Dick Butkus Award

1989: Percy Snow

- Lombardi Award

1989: Percy Snow

- Jim Thorpe Award

2013: Darqueze Dennard

- Jack Tatum Trophy

2013: Darqueze Dennard

- Johnny Unitas Golden Arm Award

2015: Connor Cook

- Doak Walker Award

2021: Kenneth Walker III

- Walter Camp Award

2021: Kenneth Walker III

==== Coaches ====
- AFCA Coach of the Year

1952: Biggie Munn
1955: Duffy Daugherty

- Eddie Robinson Coach of the Year

1965: Duffy Daugherty

- Sporting News Coach of the Year

1965: Duffy Daugherty
1978: Darryl Rogers

- Broyles Award

2013: Pat Narduzzi

=== Big Ten Conference honors ===
- Chicago Tribune Silver Football

1971: Eric Allen
1977: Larry Bethea
1987: Lorenzo White

- Player of the Year

1985: Lorenzo White
1987: Lorenzo White

- Offensive Player of the Year

1990: Tico Duckett (media)

- Quarterback of the Year

2015: Connor Cook

- Running back of the Year

2021: Kenneth Walker III

- Offensive lineman of the Year

1987: Tony Mandarich
1988: Tony Mandarich
1989: Bob Kula
1997: Flozell Adams

- Receiver of the Year

2014: Tony Lippett
2015: Aaron Burbridge

- Defensive Player of the Year

2009: Greg Jones (media)

- Defensive back of the Year

2013: Darqueze Dennard
2014: Kurtis Drummond

- Defensive lineman of the Year

2013: Shilique Calhoun
2018: Kenny Willekes

- Punter of the Year

2022: Bryce Baringer

- Freshman of the Year

1993: Reggie Garnett

- Coach of the Year

1974: Denny Stolz (media)
1977: Darryl Rogers (media)
1987: George Perles (media)
2003: John L. Smith (media)
2010: Mark Dantonio (media)
2013: Mark Dantonio (media and coaches)
2021: Mel Tucker (media and coaches)

=== Consensus All-Americans ===
Through the 2022 season, there have been 33 consensus selections of which 11 were unanimous.

Player	Position	Years
Neno DaPrato	B	1915
Sidney Wagner	G	1935
John Pingel	QB/HB/P	1937
Ed Bagdon	G	1949
Bob Carey	E	1951
Don Coleman	T	1951†
Don Dohoney	E	1953
Norm Masters	T	1955
Earl Morrall	B	1955
Dan Currie	C	1957
Walt Kowalczyk	B	1957
Sam Williams	E	1958
George Saimes	B	1962
Sherman Lewis	B	1963
Bubba Smith	DE	1965, 1966†
George Webster	DB	1965†, 1966†
Clinton Jones	B	1966
Brad Van Pelt	DB	1972†
Lorenzo White	RB	1985†, 1987
Tony Mandarich	OL	1988
Bob Kula	OL	1989
Percy Snow	LB	1989†
Charles Rogers	WR	2002†
Brandon Fields	P	2004
Javon Ringer	RB	2008
Greg Jones	LB	2009, 2010†
Jerel Worthy	DL	2011
Darqueze Dennard	DB	2013†
Kenneth Walker III	RB	2021†
Bryce Baringer	P	2022

† Unanimous All-American

=== Team honors ===
==== Retired numbers ====
Michigan State Spartans retired numbers
No.	Player	Pos.	Tenure	No. ret.	Ref.
26	Clinton Jones	RB	1964–1966	2015	
46	John Hannah (Note: Hannah was not a player but he served Michigan State University during 46 years (28 of them as president of the institution). He is also the longest-serving president of the MSU, being in charge from 1941 to 1969.)	N/A		1969	
48	Percy Snow	LB	1986–1989	2013	
78	Don Coleman	OT	1949–1951	1951	
90	George Webster	LB	1964–1966	1967	
95	Bubba Smith	DE	1964–1966	2006	

== Hall of Fame inductees ==
=== College Football Hall of Fame ===
14 former Michigan State players and coaches have been inducted into the College Football Hall of Fame, located in Atlanta, Georgia.

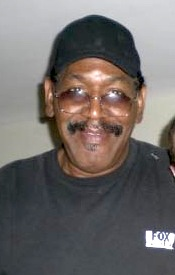
Bubba Smith (1963–1966)

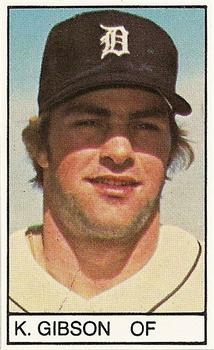
Kirk Gibson (1975–1978)

Name	Position	Tenure	Inducted	Ref.
Biggie Munn	Head coach	1947–1953	1959	
John Pingel	QB/HB/P	1935–1938	1968	
Don Coleman	OT	1948–1951	1975	
Charlie Bachman	Head coach	1944–1946	1978	
Duffy Daugherty	Head coach	1954–1972	1984	
George Webster	LB	1963–1966	1987	
Bubba Smith	DE	1963–1966	1988	
Frank Waters	Head coach	1980–1982	2000	
Brad Van Pelt	S	1969–1972	2001	
Gene Washington	WR	1963–1966	2011	
Percy Snow	LB	1986–1989	2013	
Clinton Jones	RB	1963–1966	2015	
Kirk Gibson	WR	1975–1978	2017	
Lorenzo White	RB	1984–1987	2019	
Mark Dantonio	Head coach	2007-2019	2024	

=== Pro Football Hall of Fame ===
Three former Michigan State players have been inducted into the Pro Football Hall of Fame, located in Canton, Ohio.

Name	Position	Career	Inducted	Ref.
Herb Adderley	HB	1957–1960	1980	
Joe DeLamielleure	OG	1969–1972	2003	
Morten Andersen	K	1978–1981	2017	

=== Canadian Football Hall of Fame ===
There are three Michigan State alumni inductees to the Canadian Football Hall of Fame.

Name	Position	Career	Inducted	Ref.
Abe Eliowitz	Multiple	1929–1932	1969	
Ellison Kelly	Multiple	1960-1972	1992	
Dan Bass	LB	1976–1979	2000	

=== Rose Bowl Hall of Fame ===
The Rose Bowl has inducted two Michigan State players and a coach into the Rose Bowl Game Hall of Fame.

Name	Position	Years	Inducted	Ref.
Dave Kaiser	WR/CB/K	1953–1956	1999	
Lorenzo White	RB	1984–1987	2022	
Mark Dantonio	HC	2007–2019	2024	

== Future opponents ==
=== Big Ten expansion ===
Oregon, UCLA, USC, and Washington are set to join the Big Ten beginning with the 2024 season, moving the conference to 18 total teams. On October 4, 2023, the Big Ten announced a new scheduling structure beginning with the 2024 season to accommodate the four teams joining the conference. The conference had previously announced the elimination of divisions after UCLA and USC had announced their intent to join the conference.

The scheduling model, named "Flex Protect XVII model", will protect 12 intra-conference matchups each year (protected rivalry games), with MSU playing Michigan each year. The conference announced matchups for all teams from 2024 through 2028.

=== 2026 Big Ten opponents ===
In 2026, the Spartans will play five home games and four road games in conference.

Home	Away
Illinois	Michigan
Nebraska	Rutgers
Northwestern	UCLA
Oregon	Wisconsin
Washington	

=== 2027 Big Ten opponents ===
In 2027, the Spartans will play four home games and five road games in conference.

Home	Away
Indiana	Northwestern
Michigan	Ohio State
Rutgers	Penn State
Wisconsin	Purdue
	Washington

=== 2028 Big Ten opponents ===
In 2028, the Spartans will play five home games and four road games in conference.

Home	Away
Iowa	Illinois
Minnesota	Maryland
Penn State	Michigan
Purdue	Oregon
USC	

=== Non-conference opponents ===
Announced schedules as of May 7, 2026.

2027	2028	2029	2030	2031	2032
Central Michigan	Western Michigan	Oklahoma State	Central Michigan	Western Michigan	at BYU
Duquesne	at Oklahoma State		at Cincinnati	Cincinnati	
Notre Dame					
