= George Perles =

American football player and coach (1934–2020)

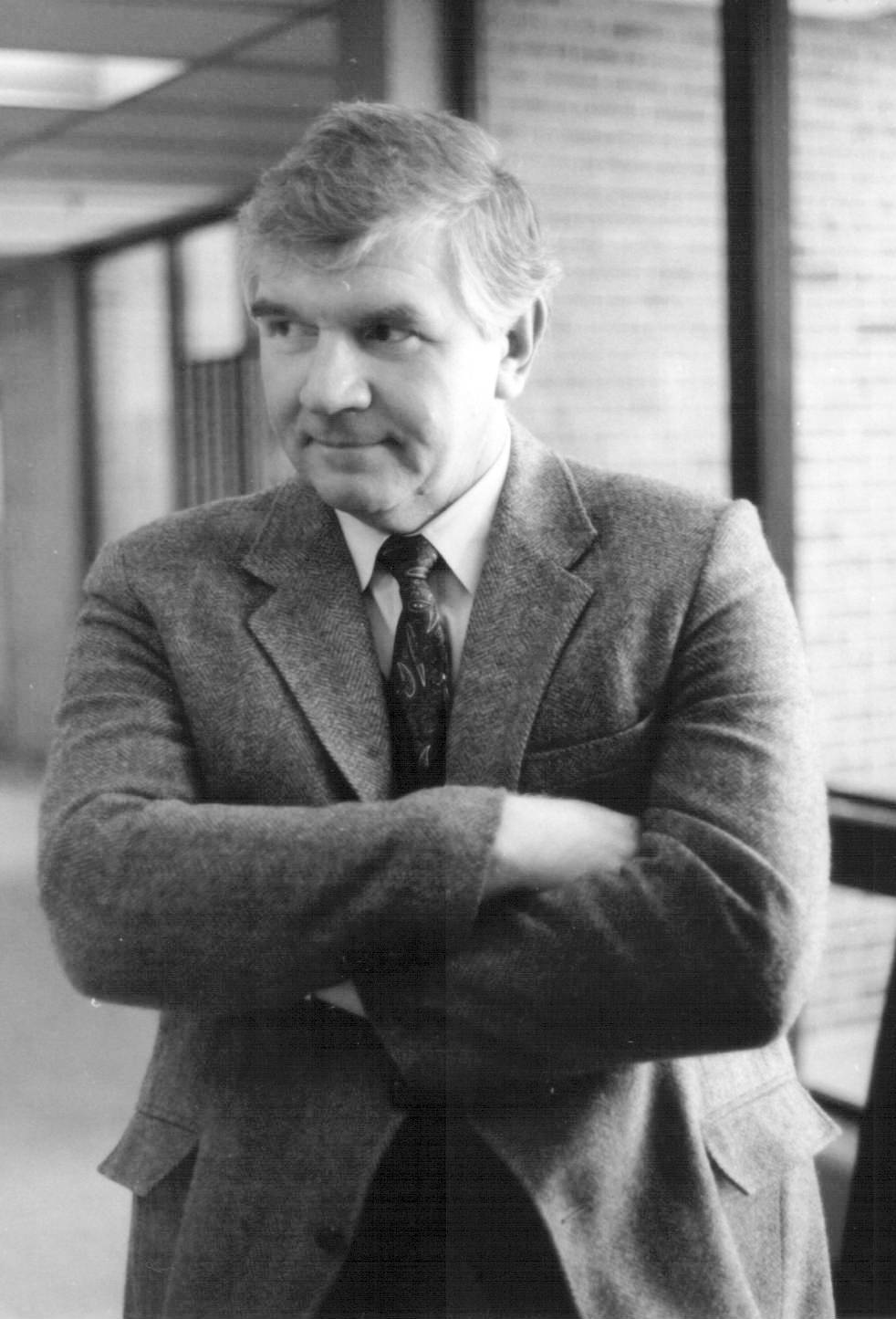
- Perles visiting Harrison High School in Farmington Hills, Michigan, 1985

Biographical details
- Born: July 16, 1934; Detroit, Michigan, U.S.
- Died: January 7, 2020 (aged 85); East Lansing, Michigan, U.S.

Playing career
- 1954–1956: Michigan State

Coaching career (HC unless noted)
- 1959–1970: Michigan State (DL)
- 1972–1977: Pittsburgh Steelers (DL)
- 1978: Pittsburgh Steelers (DC)
- 1979–1982: Pittsburgh Steelers (AHC)
- 1982: Philadelphia Stars
- 1983–1994: Michigan State

Head coaching record
- Overall: 68–67–4
- Bowls: 3–4

Accomplishments and honors

Championships
- As head coach: 2 Big Ten (1987, 1990); As assistant coach: 4× Super Bowl champion (IX, X, XIII, XIV)

Awards
- Michigan State Hall Of Fame (2007)

George Julius Perles (July 16, 1934 – January 7, 2020) was an American football player and coach. He was a defensive line coach, defensive coordinator, and assistant head coach for the National Football League (NFL)'s Pittsburgh Steelers from 1972 to 1982 and the head football coach at Michigan State University from 1983 to 1994. Perles was elected to MSU's board of trustees in 2006.

== Early years ==
Perles was born on July 16, 1934, in Detroit, the only child of Julius George and Nellie (Romain) Perles. He was of Lithuanian descent. Perles grew up in Detroit and attended Western High School. Upon graduating, Perles and 17 of his high school friends jointly enlisted in the U.S. Army.

== Michigan State ==
After returning from active duty, Perles returned to Michigan where he enrolled at Michigan State University and played football under legendary coach Duffy Daugherty. Perles played the 1958 season before his playing career was cut short by a knee injury. Perles then started his football coaching career as a graduate assistant at Michigan State before moving on to the high school ranks in Chicago and Detroit, where his St. Ambrose High School team won their first Detroit City League Championship in 1961 and their second one in 1966. Perles returned to Michigan State as defensive line coach under his mentor, Daugherty.

== Pittsburgh Steelers ==
In 1972, Chuck Noll, head coach of the Pittsburgh Steelers, reviewed dozens of resumes and interviewed numerous candidates before deciding to offer Perles the position of defensive line coach. In Perles’ first season, the Steelers made the NFL playoffs for the second time in franchise history, the first since 1947, losing to the Miami Dolphins in the AFC Championship Game.

In 1974, the Steelers won the first of six consecutive AFC Central division championships and also their first Super Bowl. Perles became the defensive coordinator for the Steelers in 1978 and then assistant head coach under Noll in 1979. During Perles's ten years with Pittsburgh (1972–1982), the Steelers won a then-record four Super Bowls and became known as the team of the decade for the 1970s, largely on the back of their "Stunt 4-3" defense designed by Perles. This defense used Joe Greene in an angled stance with Jack Lambert stacked behind him. With Greene's talent and stunts it kept Lambert free from blockers to seemingly make every tackle.

== USFL ==
In 1982, Perles was hired as the head coach of the Philadelphia Stars of the fledgling United States Football League (USFL). Perles worked for one year with the Stars during the development and formation of the league and the team, but broke his contract with the team prior to the start of the first season when he was offered the Michigan State head football coaching position. The Stars sued MSU for interfering with Perles's contract; the case was settled out of court for $175,000.

== Return to Michigan State ==
Perles returned to Michigan State University on December 3, 1982. In 12 years, he led the Spartans to two Big Ten Conference titles and seven bowl games. His best team was the 1987 unit, which won its last outright Big Ten title in the pre-championship game era and defeated USC in the 1988 Rose Bowl.

== Athletic director ==
In January, 1990, Perles became Michigan State's athletic director while remaining head football coach. Having one man as both athletic director and head football coach proved controversial, and in 1992 Perles resigned as athletic director but remained football head coach.

=== NCAA sanctions ===
During 1994–1995, an extensive external investigation conducted by the law firm of Bond, Schoeneck & King, PLLC. uncovered minor infractions by an athletic department administrator. MSU president M. Peter McPherson fired Perles before the end of the 1994 season, but allowed him to finish out the season. McPherson also ordered the Spartans to forfeit their five wins for that season. If not for the forfeits, Perles would rank third on Michigan State's all-time wins list, behind only Daugherty and Mark Dantonio.

The NCAA subsequently cleared Perles of wrongdoing.

== After coaching ==
=== Motor City Bowl ===
In 1995, Perles and former Michigan State University Sports Information Director, Ken Hoffman, founded and initiated the Motor City Bowl, a collegiate football bowl game in Detroit. In 2007, the Motor City Bowl enjoyed a record crowd of more than 63,000 people in its 11th game with Perles as chief executive officer and Hoffman as executive director.

=== MSU Board of Trustees ===
In November 2006, Perles was elected as a Democrat to the Board of Trustees of Michigan State University. He began serving an eight-year term on January 1, 2007.

In May 2007, MSU's board of trustees voted to name the plaza adjacent to the Duffy Daugherty Football Building the George J. Perles and Sally A. Perles Plaza. In November 2014, Perles was re-elected to the board of trustees of Michigan State University. His second eight-year term began on January 1, 2015. He announced his resignation effectively immediately on November 29, 2018, citing health concerns.

=== Death ===
Perles's grave at Glendale Cemetery

On January 7, 2020, Perles died from Parkinson's disease. He was 85 years old. He was buried at Glendale Cemetery in Okemos, Michigan.

== Head coaching record ==
Year	Team	Overall	Conference	Standing	Bowl/playoffs	Coaches^{#}	AP^{°}
Michigan State Spartans (Big Ten Conference) (1983–1994)
1983	Michigan State	4–6–1	2–6–1	7th			
1984	Michigan State	6–6	5–4	T–6th	L Cherry		
1985	Michigan State	7–5	5–3	T–4th	L All-American		
1986	Michigan State	6–5	4–4	5th			
1987	Michigan State	9–2–1	7–0–1	1st	W Rose	8	8
1988	Michigan State	6–5–1	6–1–1	2nd	L Gator		
1989	Michigan State	8–4	6–2	T–3rd	W Aloha	16	16
1990	Michigan State	8–3–1	6–2	T–1st	W John Hancock	14	16
1991	Michigan State	3–8	3–5	T–6th			
1992	Michigan State	5–6	5–3	3rd			
1993	Michigan State	6–6	4–4	7th	L Liberty		
1994	Michigan State	5–6*	0–4*	11th			
Michigan State:		73–62–4**	53–38–3**				
Total:		68–67–4*					
National championship Conference title Conference division title or championship game berth
^{#}Rankings from final Coaches Poll.; ^{°}Rankings from final AP Poll.

*Michigan State forfeited its entire schedule after an academic scandal; record was 5–6 (4–4 Big Ten).
**Record at Michigan State is 73–62–4 (58–37–2 Big Ten) without forfeited games.
