= 1989 Aloha Bowl =

American college football game

1989 Jeep-Eagle Aloha Bowl
Hawaii Rainbow Warriors	Michigan State Spartans
(9–2–1)	(7–4)
13	33
Head coach: Bob Wagner	Head coach: George Perles
AP / Coaches; 23 / 19	AP / Coaches; 22 / NR
	1	2	3	4	Total
Hawaii	0	0	6	7	13
Michigan State	6	13	7	7	33
- Date: December 25, 1989
- Season: 1989
- Stadium: Aloha Stadium
- Location: Honolulu, Hawaii
- MVP: Blake Ezor (RB, Michigan State)
- Favorite: Michigan State by 7
- Referee: Bill Richardson (Pac-10)
- Attendance: 50,000

United States TV coverage
- Network: ABC
- Announcers: Keith Jackson, Bob Griese and Mike Adamle

The 1989 Jeep-Eagle Aloha Bowl was a college football bowl game, played as part of the 1989–90 bowl game schedule of the 1989 NCAA Division I-A football season. It was the eighth Aloha Bowl. It was also played on Christmas Day 1989, at Aloha Stadium in Honolulu, Hawaii. The game matched the Hawaii Rainbows against the Michigan State Spartans, and was televised on ABC. The game marked the first ever bowl appearance for Hawaii. Michigan State won the 1989 contest 33–13.

The game was notable for the offensive struggles of the Rainbow Warriors in committing seven fumbles and four interceptions. Blake Ezor would star for the Spartans in being selected as the game's MVP with 41 carries for 179 yards and three touchdowns.

== Scoring summary ==
=== First quarter ===
- MSU – Blake Ezor 3-yard run (John Langeloh kick blocked) (3:59). 6–0 MSU

=== Second quarter ===
- MSU – Blake Ezor 2-yard run (John Langeloh kick) (14:53). 13–0 MSU
- MSU – John Langeloh 30-yard FG. (7:12). 16–0 MSU
- MSU – John Langeloh 34-yard FG. (1:02). 19–0 MSU

=== Third quarter ===
- HAW – Chris Roscoe 11-yard pass from Garrett Gabriel (Jason Elam kick blocked). (9:45). 19–6 MSU
- MSU – Hyland Hickson 1-yard run (John Langeloh kick). 26–6 MSU

=== Fourth quarter ===
- HAW – Dane McArthur 23-yard pass from Garrett Gabriel (Jason Elam kick). (8:07). 26–13 MSU
- MSU – Blake Ezor 26-yard run (John Langeloh kick) (5:36). 33–13 MSU

== Statistics ==
Statistic	MSU	HAW
First downs	21	19
Rushing yards	225	82
Passing yards	116	198
Total yards	341	280
Passes (Att-Comp-Int)	12–7–2	33–20–4
Punts–average	3–50.7	1–27
Fumbles–lost	0–0	7–4
Penalties–yards	9–85	3–30
