= 1988 Rose Bowl =

American college football game

- 74th Rose Bowl Game
USC Trojans	Michigan State Spartans
(8–3)	(8–2–1)
17	20
Head coach: Larry Smith	Head coach: George Perles
AP / Coaches; 16 / 17	AP / Coaches; 8 / 8
	1	2	3	4	Total
USC	3	0	7	7	17
Michigan State	7	7	0	6	20
- Date: January 1, 1988
- Season: 1987
- Stadium: Rose Bowl
- Location: Pasadena, California
- MVP: Percy Snow (MSU LB)
- Favorite: USC by 3 points
- National anthem: Spirit of Troy
- Referee: Gil Marchman (Big Ten; split crew between Big Ten and Pac-10)
- Halftime show: Spirit of Troy, Michigan State University Spartan Marching Band
- Attendance: 101,688

United States TV coverage
- Network: NBC
- Announcers: Dick Enberg, Merlin Olsen

The 1988 Rose Bowl was the 74th edition of the college football bowl game, played on January 1, at the Rose Bowl in Pasadena, California. The Michigan State Spartans defeated the USC Trojans 20–17 in a bowl rematch that was much closer than the 27–13 Spartan victory in the regular season. Michigan State linebacker Percy Snow was named the Player of the Game.

This was the last Rose Bowl game televised by NBC Sports, ending a 37-year partnership. ABC Sports picked up rights to broadcast the game the following year.

This was the Big Ten's first Rose Bowl win in seven years.

== Teams ==
The teams opened the season against each other in East Lansing, Michigan in a nationally-televised game on Labor Day night. Michigan State took advantage of three USC turnovers to defeat the Trojans, 27–13.

=== Michigan State Spartans ===
Led by head coach George Perles, a former Pittsburgh Steelers assistant coach, Michigan State had its best team in many years. The Spartans beat traditional Big 10 powers Michigan and Ohio State, and won the Big Ten by 1½ games over Indiana and Iowa, who tied for second place. They followed up the USC win by a 31–8 loss at Notre Dame, and then a 31–3 home loss to Florida State. The season got back on track with a 19–14 win at Iowa. A dramatic 17–11 win over in state rival Michigan occurred on October 10. On October 31, the Spartans defeated Ohio State, making this the first season since the 1966 National Championship when the Spartans defeated both Michigan and Ohio State. The Indiana Hoosiers also had beaten Michigan and Ohio State, and the meeting between Michigan State and Indiana on November 14 determined the Big Ten championship. Michigan State won 27–3 to clinch their first Rose Bowl appearance since the 1965 season. They are the only team in college history to not only beat Big 10 powers Ohio State and Michigan in the same season, but also the USC Trojans twice.

=== USC Trojans ===
USC struggled early and was only 4–3 after seven games, but won its next three to set up a showdown with rival UCLA (9–1) for the Pac-10 title and Rose Bowl berth. The UCLA Bruins, with Troy Aikman at quarterback and Gaston Green at running back were favored, and led 13–0 at halftime. It could have been worse, as on the last play of the first half, UCLA's Eric Turner intercepted a deflected pass at the UCLA goal line and had nothing but green grass ahead of him as he appeared primed to return it for a touchdown. But USC QB Rodney Peete ran down Turner and tackled him at the 10-yard line as time expired. USC had cut the lead to 13–10, and then midway through the 4th quarter, quarterback Rodney Peete threw to WR Erik Afholter in the back of the end zone. Afholter juggled the ball atop his shoulder pad as he slid out the end zone; television replays indicated no possession but the referees ruled it a touchdown. Leading 17–13, USC then intercepted Aikman as he tried to lead UCLA back and ran out the clock.

== Game summary ==
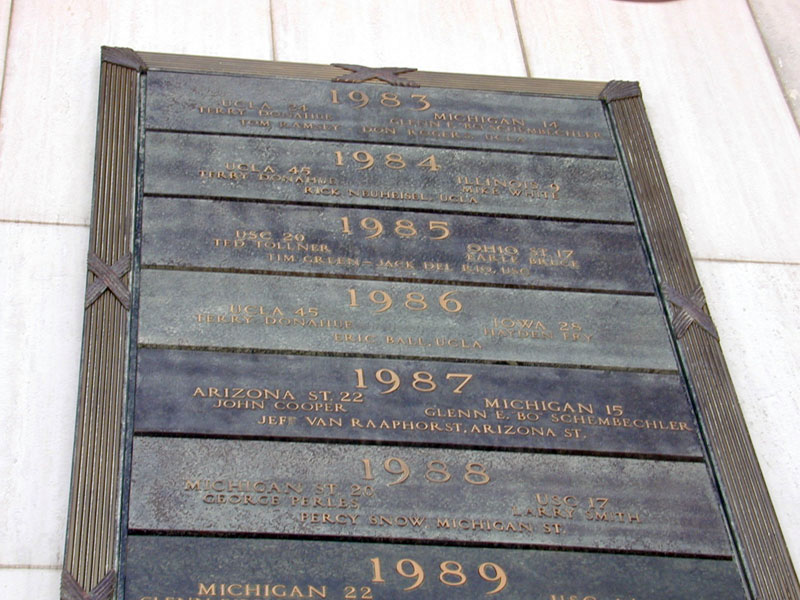
Rose Bowl records at the Hall of Champions

The game was a rematch of the season opener in East Lansing that Michigan State won 27–13. Defense dominated the game, with Michigan State linebacker and Most Valuable Player Percy Snow leading the charge. The Spartans also had their All-American running back Lorenzo White who proved to be a cut-back slashing workhorse with 35 carries for 113 yards .

After USC tied the game early in the fourth quarter at 17, Michigan State marched to a game-winning field goal by John Langeloh with four minutes to play. The key play of the drive was a third down play in which Michigan State quarterback Bobby McAllister was nearly sacked, then scrambled and at the last instant found receiver Andre Rison at the sideline for a first down that kept the drive alive. USC had time to try to come back, and Trojans quarterback Rodney Peete led USC on a drive to the MSU 29-yard line with two minutes to play. But Peete fumbled the next snap, and Michigan State recovered before running out the clock. Lorenzo White's performance in this game, combined with his superb 4-year career, helped clinch his January 2019 election to the College Football Hall of Fame .

== See also ==
- List of college football post-season games that were rematches of regular season games
