= 1989 Oregon State Beavers football team =

American college football season

1989 Oregon State Beavers football
- Conference: Pacific-10 Conference
- Record: 4–7–1 (3–4–1 Pac-10)
- Head coach: Dave Kragthorpe (5th season)
- Home stadium: Parker Stadium

1989 Pacific-10 Conference football standings
	Conf.					Overall
Team	W		L		T	W		L		T
No. 8 USC $	6	–	0	–	1	9	–	2	–	1
No. 23 Washington	5	–	3	–	0	8	–	4	–	0
Oregon	5	–	3	–	0	8	–	4	–	0
No. 25 Arizona	5	–	3	–	0	8	–	4	–	0
Arizona State	3	–	3	–	1	6	–	4	–	1
Oregon State	3	–	4	–	1	4	–	7	–	1
Washington State	3	–	5	–	0	6	–	5	–	0
Stanford	3	–	5	–	0	3	–	8	–	0
UCLA	2	–	5	–	1	3	–	7	–	1
California	2	–	6	–	0	4	–	7	–	0
$ – Conference champion; Rankings from AP Poll

The 1989 Oregon State Beavers football team represented Oregon State University in the Pacific-10 Conference (Pac-10) during the 1989 NCAA Division I-A football season. In their fifth season under head coach Dave Kragthorpe, the Beavers compiled a 4–7–1 record (3–4–1 against Pac-10 opponents), finished in sixth place in the Pac-10, and were outscored by their opponents, 357 to 207. The team played its home games at Parker Stadium in Corvallis, Oregon.

== Schedule ==
Date	Opponent	Site	Result	Attendance	Source
September 9	Stanford	Parker Stadium; Corvallis, OR	W 20–16	30,223	
September 16	at No. 23 Washington State	Martin Stadium; Pullman, WA	L 3–41	26,883	
September 23	at Boise State*	Bronco Stadium; Boise, ID	W 37–30	22,315	
September 30	at No. 3 Nebraska*	Memorial Stadium; Lincoln, NE	L 7–35	76,290	
October 7	at Fresno State*	Bulldog Stadium; Fresno, CA	L 18–35	35,164	
October 14	Arizona State	Parker Stadium; Corvallis, OR	T 17–17	29,239	
October 21	UCLA	Parker Stadium; Corvallis, OR	W 18–17	21,510	
October 28	at California	California Memorial Stadium; Berkeley, CA	W 25–14	29,000	
November 4	at No. 9 USC	Los Angeles Memorial Coliseum; Los Angeles, CA	L 6–48	72,139	
November 11	Washington	Parker Stadium; Corvallis, OR	L 14–51	32,147	
November 18	at Oregon	Autzen Stadium; Eugene, OR (rivalry)	L 21–30	46,087	
November 25	at No. 24 Hawaii*	Aloha Stadium; Halawa, HI	L 21–23	45,763	
*Non-conference game; Rankings from AP Poll released prior to the game

== Personnel ==
1989 Oregon State Beavers football team roster
Players
Coaches
Offense

Pos.	#	Name	Class
WR		Lloyd Bailey
OL		Mike Bailey
WR		Scott Benton
OL		Dan Blus
QB		Matt Booher
TE		George Breland
RB		Pat Chaffey
OL		Brad D'Ancona
OL		Johnny Feinga
WR		Al Griswold
WR		Reggie Hubbard
OL		Matt Irvin
OL		Rob Jack
RB		James Jones
WR		Jason Kent
OL		Derek Nelons
RB		Reggie Pitchford
TE		Phil Ross
QB		Nick Schichtle
OL		Pete Steffen
RB		Jerrell Waddell
RB		Dowell Williams
WR		Maurice Wilson

Defense

Pos.	#	Name	Class
DB		Brian Beck
LB		Martin Billings
DB		Kevin Dorner
LB		Paul Hill
DB		Brent Huff
DB		Billy Hughley
LB		Doug Lewis
DL		Mike Maggiore
DL		Pellom McDaniels
LB		Todd McKinley
DB		Torey Overstreet
LB		Todd Sahlfield
LB		Bruce Sanders
LB		Scott Sanders
DB		Scott Thompson
DL		Esera Tuaolo
DB		Larry Vladic

Special teams

Pos.	#	Name	Class
P		Mark Bennett
K		Tony Bussanich

Head coach

- Dave Kragthorpe

Coordinators/assistant coaches

Legend

- (C) Team captain
- (S) Suspended
- (I) Ineligible
- Injured
- Redshirt

== Game summaries ==
=== At Oregon ===
Oregon State Beavers (4–5–1) at Oregon Ducks (6–4)

Quarter	1	2	3	4	Total
Oregon St	0	0	8	13	21
Oregon	10	6	0	14	30

at Autzen Stadium, Eugene, Oregon

- Date: November 18
- Game attendance: 46,067

Game information

First quarter

- UO – Gregg McCallum 40-yard field goal. Oregon 3–0. Drive: 4 plays, 2 yards.
- UO – Derek Loville 4-yard run (Gregg McCallum kick), 3:20. Oregon 10–0. Drive: 12 plays, 95 yards.

Second quarter

- UO – Gregg McCallum 41-yard field goal, 8:59. Oregon 13–0. Drive: 9 plays, 32 yards.
- UO – Gregg McCallum 24-yard field goal, 2:55. Oregon 16–0. Drive: 11 plays, 66 yards.

Third quarter

- OSU – Marcus Wilson 25-yard pass from Nick Schichtle (run good), 1:44. Oregon 16–8. Drive: 3 plays, 23 yards.

Fourth quarter

- UO – Terry Obee 24-yard pass from Bill Musgrave (Gregg McCallum kick), 12:58. Oregon 23–8. Drive: 9 plays, 79 yards.
- OSU – Pat Chaffey 1-yard run (pass failed), 10:01. Oregon 23–14. Drive: 6 plays, 57 yards.
- OSU – Pat Chaffey 24-yard pass from Nick Schichtle (Tony Bussanich kick), 7:51. Oregon 23–21. Drive: 4 plays, 47 yards.
- UO – Derek Loville 2-yard run (Gregg McCallum kick), 4:41. Oregon 30–21. Drive: 7 plays, 57 yards.

Top passers

- OSU – Nick Schichtle – 15/29, 215 yards, 2 TD, 2 INT
- UO – Bill Musgrave – 19/38, 267 yards, TD, INT

Top rushers

- OSU – Pat Chaffey – 20 rushes, 61 yards, TD
- UO – Derek Loville – 27 rushes, 111 yards, 2 TD

Top receivers

- OSU – Pat Chaffey – 4 receptions, 67 yards, TD
- UO – Terry Obee – 6 receptions, 125 yards, TD

Largest crowd to attend football game in state history
