= 1989 Oregon Ducks football team =

American college football season

1989 Oregon Ducks football

Independence Bowl champion

Independence Bowl, W 27–24 vs. Tulsa
- Conference: Pacific-10 Conference
- Record: 8–4 (5–3 Pac-10)
- Head coach: Rich Brooks (13th season)
- Offensive coordinator: Mike Bellotti (1st season)
- Offensive scheme: Pro-style
- Defensive coordinator: Denny Schuler (4th season)
- Base defense: 5–2
- Captains: Bill Musgrave; Derek Loville; Mark Kearns; Chris Oldham
- Home stadium: Autzen Stadium

1989 Pacific-10 Conference football standings
	Conf.					Overall
Team	W		L		T	W		L		T
No. 8 USC $	6	–	0	–	1	9	–	2	–	1
No. 23 Washington	5	–	3	–	0	8	–	4	–	0
Oregon	5	–	3	–	0	8	–	4	–	0
No. 25 Arizona	5	–	3	–	0	8	–	4	–	0
Arizona State	3	–	3	–	1	6	–	4	–	1
Oregon State	3	–	4	–	1	4	–	7	–	1
Washington State	3	–	5	–	0	6	–	5	–	0
Stanford	3	–	5	–	0	3	–	8	–	0
UCLA	2	–	5	–	1	3	–	7	–	1
California	2	–	6	–	0	4	–	7	–	0
$ – Conference champion; Rankings from AP Poll

The 1989 Oregon Ducks football team represented the University of Oregon during the 1989 NCAA Division I-A football season. They were led by head coach Rich Brooks, who was in his 13th season as head coach of the Ducks. They played their home games at Autzen Stadium in Eugene, Oregon and participated as members of the Pacific-10 Conference. They finished the season with a record of eight wins and four losses (8–4 overall, 5–3 in the Pac-10) and defeated Tulsa in the Independence Bowl.

== Schedule ==
Date	Time	Opponent	Rank	Site	TV	Result	Attendance	Source
September 9	3:30 pm	California		Autzen Stadium; Eugene, OR	Prime	W 35–19	35,854	
September 16	11:00 am	at No. 24 Iowa*		Kinnick Stadium; Iowa City, IA		W 44–6	67,700	
September 23	1:00 pm	at Stanford	No. 22	Stanford Stadium; Stanford, CA (rivalry)		L 17–18	35,000	
September 30	3:30 pm	No. 17 Arizona		Autzen Stadium; Eugene, OR	Prime	W 16–10	39,631	
October 7	3:30 pm	No. 21 Washington State	No. 23	Autzen Stadium; Eugene, OR	Prime	L 38–51	44,963	
October 14	1:00 pm	at Washington		Husky Stadium; Seattle, WA (rivalry)		L 14–20	70,442	
October 21	3:30 pm	at Arizona State		Sun Devil Stadium; Tempe, AZ	Prime	W 27–7	67,370	
October 28	1:00 pm	Long Beach State*		Autzen Stadium; Eugene, OR		W 52–10	31,381	
November 4	11:00 am	at No. 23 BYU*		Cougar Stadium; Provo, UT		L 41-45	63,865	
November 11	3:30 pm	at UCLA		Rose Bowl; Pasadena, CA	ABC	W 38–20	46,433	
November 18	1:00 pm	Oregon State		Autzen Stadium; Eugene, OR (Civil War)		W 30–21	46,087	
December 16	5:00 pm	vs. Tulsa*		Independence Stadium; Shreveport, LA (Independence Bowl)	MIZLOU Sports	W 27–24	30,333	
*Non-conference game; Rankings from AP Poll released prior to the game; All times are in Pacific time

== Game summaries ==
=== Oregon State ===
Oregon State Beavers (4–5–1) at Oregon Ducks (6–4)

Quarter	1	2	3	4	Total
Oregon St	0	0	8	13	21
Oregon	10	6	0	14	30

at Autzen Stadium, Eugene, Oregon

- Date: November 18
- Game attendance: 46,067

Game information

First quarter

- UO – Gregg McCallum 40-yard field goal. Oregon 3–0. Drive: 4 plays, 2 yards.
- UO – Derek Loville 4-yard run (Gregg McCallum kick), 3:20. Oregon 10–0. Drive: 12 plays, 95 yards.

Second quarter

- UO – Gregg McCallum 41-yard field goal, 8:59. Oregon 13–0. Drive: 9 plays, 32 yards.
- UO – Gregg McCallum 24-yard field goal, 2:55. Oregon 16–0. Drive: 11 plays, 66 yards.

Third quarter

- OSU – Marcus Wilson 25-yard pass from Nick Schichtle (run good), 1:44. Oregon 16–8. Drive: 3 plays, 23 yards.

Fourth quarter

- UO – Terry Obee 24-yard pass from Bill Musgrave (Gregg McCallum kick), 12:58. Oregon 23–8. Drive: 9 plays, 79 yards.
- OSU – Pat Chaffey 1-yard run (pass failed), 10:01. Oregon 23–14. Drive: 6 plays, 57 yards.
- OSU – Pat Chaffey 24-yard pass from Nick Schichtle (Tony Bussanich kick), 7:51. Oregon 23–21. Drive: 4 plays, 47 yards.
- UO – Derek Loville 2-yard run (Gregg McCallum kick), 4:41. Oregon 30–21. Drive: 7 plays, 57 yards.

Top passers

- OSU – Nick Schichtle – 15/29, 215 yards, 2 TD, 2 INT
- UO – Bill Musgrave – 19/38, 267 yards, TD, INT

Top rushers

- OSU – Pat Chaffey – 20 rushes, 61 yards, TD
- UO – Derek Loville – 27 rushes, 111 yards, 2 TD

Top receivers

- OSU – Pat Chaffey – 4 receptions, 67 yards, TD
- UO – Terry Obee – 6 receptions, 125 yards, TD

External videos
- 1989 Oregon State at Oregon – full game broadcast

Largest crowd to attend football game in state history

== Roster ==
1989 Oregon Ducks football team roster
Players
Coaches
Offense

Pos.	#	Name	Class
RB		Dondre Bausley
RB		Latin Berry
OL		Scott Boatright
QB		Bob Brothers
OL		David Collinsworth
OL		Curt Dykes
OL		Collin Hall
OL		Brian Hanable
WR		Tony Hargain
OL		Chris Husko
WR		Anthony Jones
RB		Brandon Jumper
OL		Todd Kaanapu
RB		Ngalu Kelemeni
RB		Russell Lawson
RB		Derek Loville
TE		Joe Meerten
QB		Bill Musgrave
QB		Pete Nelson
WR		Terry Obee
WR		Joe Reitzug
RB		Kerrell Robinson
OL		Andy Sunia
TE		Kolya Tefft
TE		Jeff Thomason

Defense

Pos.	#	Name	Class
LB		Peter Brantley
DB		Eric Castle
LB		Andy Conner
DL		David Cusano
DB		Rory Dairy
LB		Joe Farwell
DB		Derek Horton
LB		Bjarne Jensen
LB		Mark Kearns
DB		Steve Kemp
DL		Matt LaBounty
DB		Chris Oldham
DB		Daryl Reed
DL		Andre Williams
DL		Marcus Woods

Special teams

Pos.	#	Name	Class
K		Gregg McCallum
P		Marc Penso
P		Ben Rough

Head coach

- Rich Brooks

Coordinators/assistant coaches

Legend

- (C) Team captain
- (S) Suspended
- (I) Ineligible
- Injured
- Redshirt
