= 1989 UCLA Bruins football team =

American college football season

1989 UCLA Bruins football
- Conference: Pacific-10 Conference
- Record: 3–7–1 (2–5–1 Pac-10)
- Head coach: Terry Donahue (14th season)
- Defensive coordinator: Bob Field (8th season)
- Home stadium: Rose Bowl

1989 Pacific-10 Conference football standings
	Conf.					Overall
Team	W		L		T	W		L		T
No. 8 USC $	6	–	0	–	1	9	–	2	–	1
No. 23 Washington	5	–	3	–	0	8	–	4	–	0
Oregon	5	–	3	–	0	8	–	4	–	0
No. 25 Arizona	5	–	3	–	0	8	–	4	–	0
Arizona State	3	–	3	–	1	6	–	4	–	1
Oregon State	3	–	4	–	1	4	–	7	–	1
Washington State	3	–	5	–	0	6	–	5	–	0
Stanford	3	–	5	–	0	3	–	8	–	0
UCLA	2	–	5	–	1	3	–	7	–	1
California	2	–	6	–	0	4	–	7	–	0
$ – Conference champion; Rankings from AP Poll

The 1989 UCLA Bruins football team was an American football team that represented the University of California, Los Angeles (UC:A) during the 1989 NCAA Division I-A football season. In their 14th year under head coach Terry Donahue, the Bruins compiled a 3–7–1 record (2–5–1 Pac-10) and finished in ninth place in the Pacific-10 Conference. After going 3–7 in the first 10 games, the Bruins tied No. 8 USC, 10–10, in the final game of the season at the Los Angeles Memorial Coliseum.

UCLA's offensive leaders in 1989 were quarterback Bret Johnson with 1,791 passing yards, running back Brian Brown with 463 rushing yards, and wide receiver Mike Farr with 471 receiving yards.

== Schedule ==
Date	Opponent	Rank	Site	TV	Result	Attendance	Source
September 9	Tennessee*	No. 6	Rose Bowl; Pasadena, CA	Prime	L 6–24	54,316	
September 16	at San Diego State*	No. 20	Jack Murphy Stadium; San Diego, CA		W 28–25	31,639	
September 23	No. 5 Michigan*	No. 24	Rose Bowl; Pasadena, CA	ABC	L 23–24	71,797	
September 30	California		Rose Bowl; Pasadena, CA (rivalry)		W 24–6	50,183	
October 7	Arizona State	No. 25	Rose Bowl; Pasadena, CA	ESPN	W 33–14	53,188	
October 14	at Arizona	No. 22	Arizona Stadium; Tucson, AZ	ABC	L 7–42	51,562	
October 21	at Oregon State		Parker Stadium; Corvallis, OR	ABC	L 17–18	21,510	
October 28	Washington		Rose Bowl; Pasadena, CA	ABC	L 27–28	48,801	
November 4	at Stanford		Stanford Stadium; Stanford, CA (rivalry)		L 14–17	45,000	
November 11	Oregon		Rose Bowl; Pasadena, CA	Prime	L 20–38	46,433	
November 18	at No. 8 USC		Los Angeles Memorial Coliseum; Los Angeles, CA (Victory Bell)	ABC	T 10–10	86,672	
*Non-conference game; Rankings from AP Poll released prior to the game

== Roster ==
1989 UCLA Bruins football team roster
Players
Coaches
Offense

Pos.	#	Name	Class
TE		Corwin Anthony
TE	81	Charles Arbuckle	Sr
TE		Randy Austin
QB		Jim Bonds
RB		Brian Brown
C	68	Frank Cornish	Sr
RB		Mark Estwick
WR	9	Mike Farr	Sr
OL		Keith Jacobson
QB		Brent Johnson
OL		Rick Meyer
WR		Scott Miller
WR		Reggie Moore
OL		Bill Paige
WR		Paul Richardson
RB		Kevin Smith
OL		Scott Spalding
RB		Maury Toy
OL		Marc Wilder
RB		Kevin Williams
RB		Shawn Wills
OL		Lance Zeno

Defense

Pos.	#	Name	Class
LB		Arnold Ale
LB		Stacy Argo
DB		Randy Beverly
DL		Brad Bryson
DB		Matt Darby
LB		Craig Davis
DB		Carlton Gray
LB		Rocen Keeton
DL		Brian Kelly
DB		Dion Lambert
LB		Brian Lockwood
DL		Mike Lodish
DB		Mark McGill
LB		Pat McPherson
LB		Marvcus Patton
DL		Jon Pryor
LB		Meech Shaw
DL		Siitupe Tuala
DB		Eric Turner
DL		Bryan Wilcox
DB		Michael Williams

Special teams

Pos.	#	Name	Class
P		Kirk Maggio
K		Alfredo Velasco

Head coach

- Terry Donahue

Coordinators/assistant coaches

Legend

- (C) Team captain
- (S) Suspended
- (I) Ineligible
- Injured
- Redshirt

== Players and awards ==
- Charles Arbuckle – tight end (309 receiving yards)
- Frank Cornish – center (1st-team pick by Football News on 1989 All-America team)
- Mike Farr – wide receiver (471 receiving yards)
- Bret Johnson – quarterback (1,791 passing yards)
- Kirk Magio – punter (1st-team pick by The Sporting News on All-America team; 1st-team pick on 1989 All-Pacific-10 Conference football team)
- Scott Miller – wide receiver (414 receiving yards)
- Kevin Williams – running back (380 rushing yards)
- Shawn Wills – running back (440 rushing yards)
