= 1989 USC Trojans football team =

American college football season

1989 USC Trojans football

Pac-10 champion Rose Bowl champion

Rose Bowl, W 17–10 vs. Michigan
- Conference: Pacific-10 Conference

Ranking
- Coaches: No. 9
- AP: No. 8
- Record: 9–2–1 (6–0–1 Pac-10)
- Head coach: Larry Smith (3rd season)
- Captains: Dan Owens Leroy Holt; Brad Leggett; Tim Ryan
- Home stadium: Los Angeles Memorial Coliseum

1989 Pacific-10 Conference football standings
	Conf.					Overall
Team	W		L		T	W		L		T
No. 8 USC $	6	–	0	–	1	9	–	2	–	1
No. 23 Washington	5	–	3	–	0	8	–	4	–	0
Oregon	5	–	3	–	0	8	–	4	–	0
No. 25 Arizona	5	–	3	–	0	8	–	4	–	0
Arizona State	3	–	3	–	1	6	–	4	–	1
Oregon State	3	–	4	–	1	4	–	7	–	1
Washington State	3	–	5	–	0	6	–	5	–	0
Stanford	3	–	5	–	0	3	–	8	–	0
UCLA	2	–	5	–	1	3	–	7	–	1
California	2	–	6	–	0	4	–	7	–	0
$ – Conference champion; Rankings from AP Poll

The 1989 USC Trojans football team represented the University of Southern California during the 1989 NCAA Division I-A football season. The season was intended to start in historic fashion, with USC set to play Illinois in Moscow in what was dubbed the Glasnost Bowl. However, the plan to play the game at Dynamo Stadium fell through, and the game was rescheduled at Memorial Coliseum. The Trojans lost the game as the Illini scored two touchdowns in the fourth quarter.

USC won their third consecutive Pac-10 conference championship and gained their 600th program win in a victory against Oregon State. They played third-ranked Michigan in the Rose Bowl and won, giving Larry Smith his only bowl victory in his six seasons as head coach.

== Schedule ==
Date	Time	Opponent	Rank	Site	TV	Result	Attendance	Source
September 4	5:00 p.m.	No. 22 Illinois*	No. 5	Los Angeles Memorial Coliseum; Los Angeles, CA	ABC	L 13–14	54,622	
September 16	7:00 p.m.	Utah State*	No. 13	Los Angeles Memorial Coliseum; Los Angeles, CA		W 66–10	50,249	
September 23	12:30 p.m.	No. 20 Ohio State*	No. 12	Los Angeles Memorial Coliseum; Los Angeles, CA	ABC	W 42–3	69,876	
September 30	12:30 p.m.	at No. 19 Washington State	No. 11	Martin Stadium; Pullman, WA	ABC	W 18–17	38,434	
October 7	12:30 p.m.	Washington	No. 9	Los Angeles Memorial Coliseum; Los Angeles, CA	ABC	W 24–16	58,410	
October 14	3:30 p.m.	at California	No. 10	California Memorial Stadium; Berkeley, CA	Prime	W 31–15	52,000	
October 21	12:30 p.m.	at No. 1 Notre Dame*	No. 9	Notre Dame Stadium; Notre Dame, IN (Jeweled Shillelagh)	CBS	L 24–28	59,075	
October 28	3:30 p.m.	Stanford^{†}	No. 10	Los Angeles Memorial Coliseum; Los Angeles, CA (rivalry)	Prime	W 19–0	67,411	
November 4	3:30 p.m.	Oregon State	No. 9	Los Angeles Memorial Coliseum; Los Angeles, CA	Prime	W 48–6	72,139	
November 11	12:30 p.m.	at No. 25 Arizona	No. 9	Arizona Stadium; Tucson, AZ	ABC	W 24–3	52,606	
November 18	12:30 p.m.	UCLA	No. 8	Los Angeles Memorial Coliseum; Los Angeles, CA (Victory Bell)	ABC	T 10–10	86,672	
January 1, 1990	2:00 p.m.	vs. No. 3 Michigan*	No. 12	Rose Bowl; Pasadena, CA (Rose Bowl)	ABC	W 17–10	103,450	
*Non-conference game; ^{†}Homecoming; Rankings from AP Poll released prior to the game

== Game summaries ==
=== Ohio State ===
#25 Ohio State Buckeyes (1–0) at #12 USC Trojans (1–1)

Quarter	1	2	3	4	Total
Ohio St	3	0	0	0	3
USC	0	21	14	7	42

at Los Angeles Memorial Coliseum, Los Angeles, California

- Date: September 23
- Game time: 12:30 p.m. PST
- Game weather: Sunny, 74 °F (23 °C)
- Game attendance: 69,876
- Referee: Pat Flood
- Box Score

Game information

First quarter

- OSU – Pat O'Morrow 45-yard field goal, 4:18. Ohio St 3–0. Drive: 11 plays, 49 yards, 5:20.

Second quarter

- USC – Scott Galbraith 3-yard pass from Shane Foley (Quin Rodriguez kick), 11:20. USC 7–3. Drive: 13 plays, 80 yards, 5:12.
- USC – John Jackson 87-yard pass from Todd Marinovich (Quin Rodriguez kick), 8:21. USC 14–3. Drive: 3 plays, 95 yards, 1:36.
- USC – Scott Galbraith 11-yard pass from Todd Marinovich (Quin Rodriguez kick), 7:31. USC 21–3. Drive: 1 play, 11 yards, 0:08.

Third quarter

- USC – Gary Wellman 19-yard pass from Todd Marinovich (Quin Rodriguez kick), 3:16. USC 28–3. Drive: 8 plays, 88 yards, 3:46.
- USC – Gary Wellman 17-yard pass from Todd Marinovich (Quin Rodriguez kick), 0:04. USC 35–3. Drive: 6 plays, 35 yards, 2:41.

Fourth quarter

- USC – Mazio Royster 1-yard run (Quin Rodriguez kick), 1:38. USC 42–3. Drive: 9 plays, 46 yards, 3:57.

Top passers

- OSU – Greg Frey – 13/28, 135 yards, INT
- USC – Todd Marinovich – 14/22, 246 yards, 4 TD, INT

Top rushers

- OSU – Carlos Snow – 11 rushes, 83 yards
- USC – Ricky Ervins – 21 rushes, 117 yards

Top receivers

- OSU – Jeff Graham – 3 receptions, 43 yards
- USC – John Jackson – 2 receptions, 108 yards, TD

=== At Washington State ===
Team	1	2	3	4	Total
• USC	0	10	0	8	18
Washington St	7	3	7	0	17

- Date: September 30
- Location: Martin Stadium, Pullman, WA
- Game weather: Overcast

Scoring summary
1		WSU	Stallworth 77-yard pass from Garcia (Hanson kick)	WSU 7-0
2		USC	Rodriguez 33-yard field goal	WSU 7-3
2		WSU	Hanson 23-yard field goal	WSU 10-3
2		USC	Jackson 8-yard pass from Ervins (Rodriguez kick)	Tied 10-10
3		WSU	Broussard 49-yard pass from Garcia (Hanson kick)	WSU 17-10
4	0:04	USC	Ervins 2-yard pass from Marinovich (Marinovich to Wellman pass)	USC 18-17

=== At Notre Dame ===
#9 USC Trojans (5–1) at #1 Notre Dame Fighting Irish (6–0)

Quarter	1	2	3	4	Total
USC	14	3	0	7	24
Notre Dame	7	0	7	14	28

at Notre Dame Stadium, South Bend, Indiana

- Date: October 21, 1989
- Game attendance: 59,075
- TV announcers (CBS): Jim Nantz
- Recap/Box Score

Game information

First quarter

- USC – Larry Wallace 12-yard pass from Todd Marinovich (Quin Rodriguez kick), 12:47. USC 7–0.
- ND – Tony Rice 7-yard run (Craig Hentrich kick), 9:10. Tie 7–7.
- USC – John Jackson 15-yard pass from Todd Marinovich (Quin Rodriguez kick), 7:47. USC 14–7.

Second quarter

- USC – Quin Rodriguez 25-yard field goal, 10:22. USC 17–7.

Third quarter

- ND – Ricky Watters 2-yard run (Craig Hentrich kick), 9:17. USC 17–14. Drive: 8 plays.

Fourth quarter

- ND – Anthony Johnson 35-yard run (Craig Hentrich kick), 13:51. Notre Dame 21–17. Drive: 80 yards.
- USC – Gary Wellman 16-yard pass from Todd Marinovich (Quin Rodriguez kick), 9:01. USC 24–21. Drive: 4 plays.
- ND – Tony Rice 15-yard run (Craig Hentrich kick), 5:18. Notre Dame 28–24. Drive: 80 yards.

Top passers

- USC – Todd Marinovich – 33/55, 333 yards, 3 TD, 3 INT
- ND – Tony Rice – 5/16, 91 yards

Top rushers

- USC – Ricky Ervins – 12 rushes, 64 yards
- ND – Tony Rice – 18 rushes, 99 yards, 2 TD

Top receivers

- USC – John Jackson – 14 receptions, 200 yards, TD
- ND – Raghib Ismail – 2 receptions, 62 yards

- Pregame fight in tunnel

External videos
- 1989 USC at Notre Dame – Television broadcast
- 1989 USC at Notre Dame – Highlights

=== Stanford ===
Stanford at USC

Team	1	2	3	4	Total
Cardinal	0	0	0	0	0
• No. 10 Trojans	0	10	3	6	19

- Date: October 28
- Location: Los Angeles Memorial Coliseum, Los Angeles, CA
- Game attendance: 67,411
- Television network: Prime

Scoring summary
Q2	USC	Rodriguez 28 yard field goal	USC 3–0
Q2	USC	Ervins 9 yard run (Rodriguez kick)	USC 10–0
Q3	USC	Rodriguez 25 yard field goal	USC 13–0
Q4	USC	Holt 5 yard run (pass failed)	USC 19–0

=== Vs. Michigan (Rose Bowl) ===
USC vs. Michigan

Team	1	2	3	4	Total
• No. 12 Trojans	0	10	0	7	17
No. 3 Wolverines	0	3	7	0	10

- Date: January 1
- Location: Rose Bowl, Pasadena, CA
- Game attendance: 103,450
- Referee: Jim Kemerling
- TV announcers (ABC): Keith Jackson, Bob Griese

Scoring summary
Q2		USC	Marinovich 1-yard run (Rodriguez kick)	USC 7–0
Q2	6:28	MICH	Carlson 19-yard field goal	USC 7–3
Q2		USC	Rodriguez 34-yard field goal	USC 10–3
Q3		MICH	Jeffereson 2-yard run (Carlson kick)	Tied 10–10
Q4		USC	Ervins 9 yard run (Rodriguez kick)	USC 17–10

The Trojans avenged last season's loss to Michigan in the Rose Bowl, beating the Wolverines in Bo Schembechler's last game as head coach.

== Personnel ==
1989 USC Trojans football team roster
Players
Coaches
Offense

Pos.	#	Name	Class
RB		Aaron Emanuel	Sr
RB	34	Ricky Ervins	Jr
QB		Shane Foley
TE	86	Scott Galbraith	Sr
TE		Frank Griffin
OL		Pat Harlow	Jr
RB		Calvin Holmes
RB	39	Leroy Holt	Sr
WR		John Jackson
C	63	Brad Leggett	Sr
RB	40	Scott Lockwood
QB	13	Todd Marinovich	RFr
QB	4	Pat O'Hara	Jr
OL		Brent Parkinson
RB		Mazio Royster
OL		Bill Schultz
WR		Joel Scott
G	75	Mark Tucker	Jr
WR		Larry Wallace
WR	83	Gary Wellman	Jr

Defense

Pos.	#	Name	Class
LB	98	Kurt Barber	So
S	7	Mark Carrier	Jr
LB		Delmar Chesley
DB		Cleveland Colter
DL		Gene Fruge
DB		Dwayne Garner
DT	90	Dan Owens	Sr
LB	35	Scott Ross	Jr
DT	99	Tim Ryan	Sr
LB	55	Junior Seau	Jr
DB		Ernest Spears
LB		Michael Williams

Special teams

Pos.	#	Name	Class
P		Ron Dale
P		Marc Preston
K	11	Quin Rodriguez	Jr
K		Grant Runnerstrum

Head coach

- Larry Smith

Coordinators/assistant coaches

- Tom Roggeman

Legend

- (C) Team captain
- (S) Suspended
- (I) Ineligible
- Injured
- Redshirt

== Team players drafted into the NFL ==
The following players were selected in the 1990 NFL draft:

Player	Position	Round	Pick	NFL club
Junior Seau	Linebacker	1	5	San Diego Chargers
Mark Carrier	Safety	1	6	Chicago Bears
Dan Owens	Defensive end	2	35	Detroit Lions
Tim Ryan	Defensive end	3	61	Chicago Bears
William Schultz	Guard	4	94	Indianapolis Colts
Leroy Holt	Running back	5	137	Miami Dolphins
Scott Galbraith	Tight end	7	178	Cleveland Browns
Aaron Emanuel	Running back	7	191	New York Giants
Brad Leggett	Center	8	219	Denver Broncos
Ernest Spears	Defensive back	10	216	New Orleans Saints
