= 1989 Washington State Cougars football team =

American college football season

1989 Washington State Cougars football
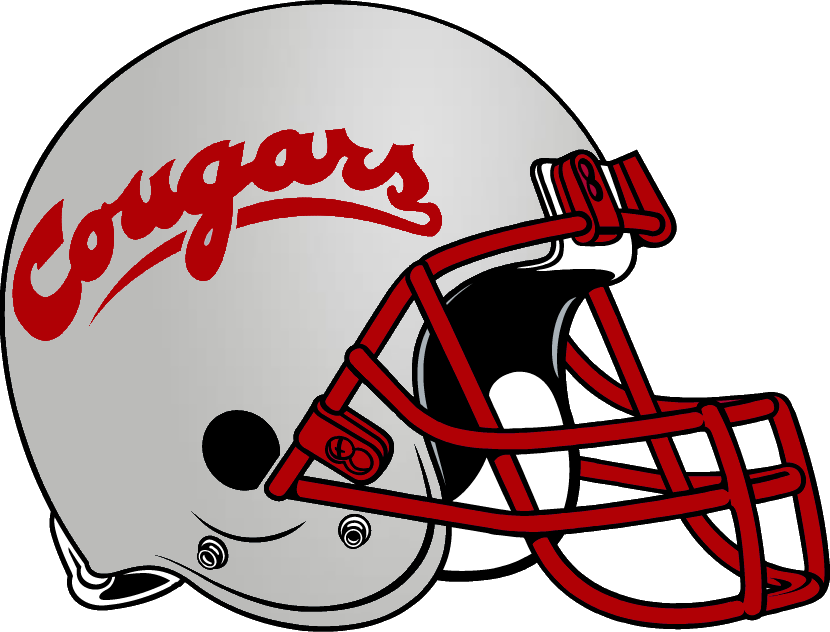
- Conference: Pacific-10 Conference
- Record: 6–5 (3–5 Pac-10)
- Head coach: Mike Price (1st season)
- Offensive coordinator: Joe Tiller (1st season)
- Offensive scheme: Spread
- Defensive coordinator: Mike Zimmer (1st season)
- Base defense: 4–3
- Home stadium: Martin Stadium

1989 Pacific-10 Conference football standings
	Conf.					Overall
Team	W		L		T	W		L		T
No. 8 USC $	6	–	0	–	1	9	–	2	–	1
No. 23 Washington	5	–	3	–	0	8	–	4	–	0
Oregon	5	–	3	–	0	8	–	4	–	0
No. 25 Arizona	5	–	3	–	0	8	–	4	–	0
Arizona State	3	–	3	–	1	6	–	4	–	1
Oregon State	3	–	4	–	1	4	–	7	–	1
Washington State	3	–	5	–	0	6	–	5	–	0
Stanford	3	–	5	–	0	3	–	8	–	0
UCLA	2	–	5	–	1	3	–	7	–	1
California	2	–	6	–	0	4	–	7	–	0
$ – Conference champion; Rankings from AP Poll

The 1989 Washington State Cougars football team was an American football team that represented Washington State University in the Pacific-10 Conference (Pac-10) during the 1989 NCAA Division I-A football season. In their first season under head coach Mike Price, the Cougars compiled a 6–5 record (3–5 in Pac-10, tied for seventh), and outscored their opponents 351 to 268.

The team's statistical leaders included Aaron Garcia with 2,741 passing yards, Steve Broussard with 1,237 rushing yards, and Tim Stallworth with 548 receiving yards. The Cougars won their first four games, then were 6–1 and ranked fifteenth in the AP poll, but lost their final four games.

Following the departure of head coach Dennis Erickson for Miami in early March, Price was hired a week later; a former Cougar player and assistant, he was previously the head coach for eight years in the Big Sky Conference at Weber State in Ogden, Utah.

== Schedule ==
Date	Opponent	Rank	Site	TV	Result	Attendance	Source
September 2	No. 6 Idaho*		Martin Stadium; Pullman, WA (Battle of the Palouse)		W 41–7	33,914	
September 7	at No. 24 BYU*		Cougar Stadium; Provo, UT		W 46–41	65,030	
September 16	Oregon State	No. 23	Martin Stadium; Pullman, WA		W 41–3	26,883	
September 23	at Wyoming*	No. 19	War Memorial Stadium; Laramie, WY		W 29–23	20,041	
September 30	No. 11 USC	No. 19	Martin Stadium; Pullman, WA	ABC	L 17–18	38,434	
October 7	at No. 23 Oregon	No. 21	Autzen Stadium; Eugene, OR	Prime	W 51–38	44,963	
October 14	Stanford	No. 17	Martin Stadium; Pullman, WA	ESPN	W 31–13	24,617	
October 21	No. 22 Arizona^{†}	No. 15	Martin Stadium; Pullman, WA	Prime	L 21–23	36,090	
October 28	at Arizona State	No. 23	Sun Devil Stadium; Tempe, AZ		L 39–44	62,416	
November 11	at California		California Memorial Stadium; Berkeley, CA		L 26–38	33,000	
November 18	at Washington		Husky Stadium; Seattle, WA (Apple Cup)		L 9–20	73,527	
*Non-conference game; ^{†}Homecoming; Rankings from AP Poll released prior to the game

== Roster ==
1989 Washington State Cougars football team roster
Players
Coaches
Offense

Pos.	#	Name	Class
TE		Kevin Andal
RB	31	Steve Broussard	Sr
RB		Paul Carr
WR		Desmond Clayton
G	70	Steve Cromer	Jr
WR	1	C. J. Davis	So
QB	9	Aaron Garcia	Fr
OT	74	Bob Garman	So
WR		Curtis Geathers
QB	12	Brad Gossen	Jr
WR	5	Calvin Griggs	Jr
OT	73	John Husby	Sr
TE	46	Rodd Olson	Sr
QB		Mike Pattinson
RB		Rodney Scott
WR	80	Jody Sears	Jr
G	63	Mike Smith	Jr
WR	2	Tim Stallworth	Sr
WR		Roger Stogner
RB	33	Rich Swinton	Jr
OL		Andy Tribble
TE	82	Doug Wellsandt	Sr
TE		Clarence Williams
RB	32	Shaumbe Wright-Fair	Fr
C	56	Paul Wulff	Sr
WR	87	Ron Young	Jr

Defense

Pos.	#	Name	Class
DE	99	Marlin Brown	Sr
LB	48	Lewis Bush	So
S	22	John Diggs	Jr
DE	97	Tim Downing	Sr
DB		Alvin Dunn
LB	43	Phil Garabedian	Sr
DE	96	Randy Gray	Sr
LB	50	Dan Grayson	Sr
S	10	Jay Languein	Sr
LB	91	Mark Ledbetter	Sr
S	6	Chris Moton	Jr
CB	37	Roosevelt Noble	Sr
LB		Rod Plummer
CB	26	Ron Ricard	Jr
DT	75	Tony Savage	Sr
DL		Kirk Westerfield
DL		Jeron Woodley
DB	20	Michael Wright	So

Special teams

Pos.	#	Name	Class
K	4	Jason Hanson	So
P	45	Rob Myers	Sr

Head coach

- Mike Price (1st year)

Coordinators/assistant coaches

- Joe Tiller - OC
- Mike Zimmer - DC
- Chris Ball - GA

Legend

- (C) Team captain
- (S) Suspended
- (I) Ineligible
- Injured
- Redshirt

== NFL draft ==
Six Cougars were selected in the 1990 NFL draft.

Player	Position	Round	Overall	Franchise
Steve Broussard	RB	1	20	Atlanta Falcons
Tony Savage	DT	5	112	New York Jets
Tim Stallworth	WR	6	161	Los Angeles Rams
Dan Grayson	LB	7	182	Pittsburgh Steelers
Doug Wellsandt	TE	8	204	Cincinnati Bengals
Tim Downing	DE	11	302	New York Giants
