= Francis Cornish =

Francis Cornish may refer to:

- Francis Cornish (diplomat) (born 1942), British diplomat
- Francis Evans Cornish (1831–1878), Canadian politician
- The protagonist of Robertson Davies’ 1985 novel What's Bred in the Bone

== See also ==
- Francis Warre-Cornish (1839–1916), British scholar and writer
- Frank Cornish (1967–2008), American football player
- Frank Cornish Jr. (born 1944), American football player
