= 1989 Stanford Cardinal football team =

American college football season

1989 Stanford Cardinal football
- Conference: Pacific-10 Conference
- Record: 3–8 (3–5 Pac-10)
- Head coach: Dennis Green (1st season)
- Offensive coordinator: Ron Turner (1st season)
- Offensive scheme: West Coast
- Defensive coordinator: Fred von Appen (2nd season)
- Base defense: 4–3
- Home stadium: Stanford Stadium

1989 Pacific-10 Conference football standings
| | Conf. | | | | | Overall |
| Team | W | | L | | T | W | | L | | T |
|---|---|---|---|---|---|---|---|---|---|---|
| No. 8 USC $ | 6 | – | 0 | – | 1 | 9 | – | 2 | – | 1 |
| No. 23 Washington | 5 | – | 3 | – | 0 | 8 | – | 4 | – | 0 |
| Oregon | 5 | – | 3 | – | 0 | 8 | – | 4 | – | 0 |
| No. 25 Arizona | 5 | – | 3 | – | 0 | 8 | – | 4 | – | 0 |
| Arizona State | 3 | – | 3 | – | 1 | 6 | – | 4 | – | 1 |
| Oregon State | 3 | – | 4 | – | 1 | 4 | – | 7 | – | 1 |
| Washington State | 3 | – | 5 | – | 0 | 6 | – | 5 | – | 0 |
| Stanford | 3 | – | 5 | – | 0 | 3 | – | 8 | – | 0 |
| UCLA | 2 | – | 5 | – | 1 | 3 | – | 7 | – | 1 |
| California | 2 | – | 6 | – | 0 | 4 | – | 7 | – | 0 |
$ – Conference champion; Rankings from AP Poll

The 1989 Stanford Cardinal football team represented Stanford University in the 1989 NCAA Division I-A football season. They were coached by first-year coach Dennis Green, previously an assistant coach with the San Francisco 49ers and hired to replace Jack Elway, who was fired the previous year.

== Schedule ==
| Date | Time | Opponent | Site | TV | Result | Attendance | Source |
|---|---|---|---|---|---|---|---|
| September 2 | 6:00 p.m. | at No. 18 Arizona | Arizona Stadium; Tucson, AZ | Prime | L 3–19 | 48,712 | |
| September 9 | 6:00 p.m. | at Oregon State | Parker Stadium; Corvallis, OR | | L 16–20 | 30,223 | |
| September 23 | 1:00 p.m. | No. 22 Oregon | Stanford Stadium; Stanford, CA (rivalry) | | W 18–17 | 35,000 | |
| September 30 | 1:00 p.m. | San Jose State* | Stanford Stadium; Stanford, CA (rivalry) | | L 33–40 | 58,000 | |
| October 7 | 1:00 p.m. | No. 1 Notre Dame* | Stanford Stadium; Stanford, CA (Legends Trophy) | WSJV | L 17–27 | 86,019 | |
| October 14 | 7:30 p.m. | at No. 17 Washington State | Martin Stadium; Pullman, WA | ESPN | L 13–31 | 24,617 | |
| October 21 | 1:00 p.m. | Utah* | Stanford Stadium; Stanford, CA | | L 24–27 | 15,000 | |
| October 28 | 3:30 p.m. | at No. 10 USC | Los Angeles Memorial Coliseum; Los Angeles, CA (rivalry) | Prime | L 0–19 | 67,411 | |
| November 4 | 1:00 p.m. | UCLA | Stanford Stadium; Stanford, CA (rivalry) | | W 17–14 | 45,000 | |
| November 11 | 6:00 p.m. | at Arizona State | Sun Devil Stadium; Tempe, AZ | | L 22–30 | 65,312 | |
| November 18 | 1:00 p.m. | California | Stanford Stadium; Stanford, CA (Big Game) | Prime | W 24–14 | 86,019 | |
*Non-conference game; Rankings from AP Poll released prior to the game; All times are in Pacific time

== Game summaries ==
=== Notre Dame ===
#1 Notre Dame Fighting Irish (4–0) at Stanford Cardinal (1–3)

| Quarter | 1 | 2 | 3 | 4 | Total |
|---|---|---|---|---|---|
| Notre Dame | 0 | 14 | 7 | 6 | 27 |
| Stanford | 6 | 0 | 8 | 3 | 17 |

at Stanford Stadium, Stanford, California

- Date: October 7
- Game attendance: 86,019
- Recap/Box Score

Game information

First quarter

- STAN – John Hopkins 34-yard field goal, 5:14. Stanford 3–0. Drive: 14 plays.
- STAN – John Hopkins 42-yard field goal, 2:40. Stanford 6–0.

Second quarter

- ND – Anthony Johnson 7-yard run (Craig Hentrich kick), 12:24. Notre Dame 7–6. Drive: 4 plays, 64 yards.
- ND – Rodney Culver 2-yard run (Craig Hentrich kick), 1:15. Notre Dame 14–6. Drive: 9 plays.

Third quarter

- STAN – Ed McCaffrey 2-yard pass from Smith (run good), Tie 14–14. Drive: 79 yards.
- ND – Anthony Johnson 1-yard run (Craig Hentrich kick), 7:28. Notre Dame 21–14.

Fourth quarter

- ND – Craig Hentrich 20-yard field goal, 12:42. Notre Dame 24–14.
- STAN – John Hopkins 27-yard field goal, 8:14. Notre Dame 24–17. Drive: 12 plays, 70 yards.
- ND – Craig Hentrich 18-yard field goal, 1:27. Notre Dame 27–17.

Top passers

- ND – Tony Rice – 7/17, 102 yards
- STAN – Steve Smith – 39/68, 282 yards, TD, 3 int

Top rushers

- ND – Anthony Johnson – 15 rushes, 75 yards, 2 TD
- STAN – Tommy Vardell – 9 rushes, 22 yards

Top receivers

- ND – Raghib Ismail – 3 receptions, 67 yards
- STAN – Jim Price – 14 receptions, 98 yards

Steve Smith set the Pac-10 single game record for pass attempts.

== Roster ==
1989 Stanford Cardinal football team roster
Players
Coaches
Offense

| Pos. | # | Name | Class |
|---|---|---|---|
| OL | | Darran Baird |
| WR | | Walter Batson |
| TE | | Turner Baur |
| TE | | Cory Booker |
| RB | | Todd Burton |
| OL | | John Carpenter |
| OL | | Chris Dalman |
| RB | | Scott Eschelman |
| QB | 5 | Brian Johnson | Sr |
| RB | | J.J. Lasley |
| QB | 17 | John Lynch | Fr |
| WR | 40 | Ed McCaffrey | Jr |
| OL | | Rick Pallow |
| QB | 12 | Jason Palumbis | So |
| OL | | Andy Papathanassiou |
| WR | | Jon Pinckney |
| TE | 89 | Jim Price | Sr |
| QB | 9 | Steve Smith | Fr |
| RB | | Gary Taylor |
| FB | 44 | Tommy Vardell | So |
| WR | 80 | Chris Walsh | So |
| OT | 70 | Bob Whitfield | So |

Defense

| Pos. | # | Name | Class |
|---|---|---|---|
| DL | 72 | Lester Archambeau | Sr |
| DL | | Estevan Avila |
| DB | | Herbie Berry |
| DL | | Matt Borkowski |
| DB | | Galen Foster |
| LB | | Dave Garnett |
| CB | 21 | Darrien Gordon | Fr |
| DB | | Alan Grant |
| LB | | Chris Hawkins |
| LB | | Bob Hinckley |
| DB | | Jimmy Klein |
| LB | | Bruce Lang |
| LB | | Charles Lough |
| DL | | Scott Palmbush |
| DL | | Aaron Rembisz |
| DB | | Albert Richardson |
| DB | | Kevin Scott |
| DB | | Tony Trousset |
| LB | | Jono Tunney |

Special teams

| Pos. | # | Name | Class |
|---|---|---|---|
| K | 94 | John Hopkins | Jr |

Head coach

- Dennis Green

Coordinators/assistant coaches

- Ron Turner – Offensive coordinator and quarterbacks
- Tyrone Willingham – Running backs
- Brian Billick – Wide receivers and tight ends
- Chris Foerster – Assistant offensive line coach
- Fred von Appen – Defensive coordinator and defensive line
- Mike Tolleson – Inside linebackers
- Dick Mannini – Inside linebackers
- Dave Tipton – Outside linebackers
- Willie Shaw – Secondary

Legend

- (C) Team captain
- (S) Suspended
- (I) Ineligible
- Injured
- Redshirt
