= 1989 California Golden Bears football team =

American college football season

1989 California Golden Bears football
- Conference: Pacific-10 Conference
- Record: 4–7 (2–6 Pac-10)
- Head coach: Bruce Snyder (3rd season)
- Defensive coordinator: Kent Baer (3rd season)
- Home stadium: California Memorial Stadium

1989 Pacific-10 Conference football standings
	Conf.					Overall
Team	W		L		T	W		L		T
No. 8 USC $	6	–	0	–	1	9	–	2	–	1
No. 23 Washington	5	–	3	–	0	8	–	4	–	0
Oregon	5	–	3	–	0	8	–	4	–	0
No. 25 Arizona	5	–	3	–	0	8	–	4	–	0
Arizona State	3	–	3	–	1	6	–	4	–	1
Oregon State	3	–	4	–	1	4	–	7	–	1
Washington State	3	–	5	–	0	6	–	5	–	0
Stanford	3	–	5	–	0	3	–	8	–	0
UCLA	2	–	5	–	1	3	–	7	–	1
California	2	–	6	–	0	4	–	7	–	0
$ – Conference champion; Rankings from AP Poll

The 1989 California Golden Bears football team was an American football team that represented the University of California, Berkeley in the Pacific-10 Conference (Pac-10) during the 1989 NCAA Division I-A football season. In their third year under head coach Bruce Snyder, the Golden Bears compiled a 4–7 record (2–6 against Pac-10 opponents), finished in last place in the Pac-10, and were outscored by their opponents by a combined total of 288 to 200.

The team's statistical leaders included Troy Taylor with 2,738 passing yards, Anthony Wallace with 560 rushing yards, and Brian Treggs with 746 receiving yards.

== Schedule ==
Date	Opponent	Site	Result	Attendance	Source
September 9	at Oregon	Autzen Stadium; Eugene, OR	L 19–35	35,854	
September 16	at No. 3 Miami (FL)*	Miami Orange Bowl; Miami, FL	L 3–31	56,931	
September 23	Wisconsin*	California Memorial Stadium; Berkeley, CA	W 20–14	36,000	
September 30	at UCLA	Rose Bowl; Los Angeles, CA (rivalry)	L 6–24	50,183	
October 7	San Jose State*	California Memorial Stadium; Berkeley, CA	W 26–21	31,000	
October 14	No. 10 USC	California Memorial Stadium; Berkeley, CA	L 15–31	52,000	
October 21	Washington	California Memorial Stadium; Berkeley, CA	L 16–29	20,000	
October 28	Oregon State	California Memorial Stadium; Berkeley, CA	L 14–25	29,000	
November 4	No. 15 Arizona	California Memorial Stadium; Berkeley, CA	W 29–28	29,000	
November 11	Washington State	California Memorial Stadium; Berkeley, CA	W 38–26	33,000	
November 18	at Stanford	Stanford Stadium; Stanford, CA (Big Game)	L 14–24	86,019	
*Non-conference game; Rankings from AP Poll released prior to the game

== Game summaries ==
=== At Miami (FL) ===
California at #3 Miami (FL)

Team	1	2	3	4	Total
Golden Bears	3	0	0	0	3
• Hurricanes	0	17	7	7	31

- Date: September 16
- Location: Orange Bowl (stadium), Miami, Florida
- Game attendance: 56,931
- Game weather: 93 °F (34 °C), Partly cloudy, Wind S 15 mph (24 km/h)
- TV announcers (ESPN): Tim Brando, Gene Washington

Scoring summary
1	7:45	CAL	Robbie Keen 45-yard field goal	CAL 3–0
2		MIA	Huerta 29-yard field goal	Tied 3–3
2	4:48	MIA	Conley 6-yard run (Huerta kick)	MIA 10–3
2	2:10	MIA	Crowell 2-yard pass from Erickson (Huerta kick)	MIA 17–3
3	0:11	MIA	Dawkins 18-yard pass from Erickson (Huerta kick)	MIA 24–3
4	12:46	MIA	Hill 33-yard pass from Erickson (Huerta kick)	MIA 31–3

== Roster ==
1989 California Golden Bears football team roster
Players
Coaches
Offense

Pos.	#	Name	Class
OL		Troy Auzenne
WR		Mike Caldwell
QB		Ron Flores
WR		Mike Ford
OL		Steve Gordon
TE		Anthony Grandison
TE		Ken Griggs
DB		Tim Jenkins
RB		Jeff Jones
QB		Mike Pawlawski
WR		Anthony Randolph
OL		James Richards
OL		Ernie Rogers
RB		Bob Schnellenberg
WR		Michael Smith
OL		Tony Smith
TE		Faasamala Tagaloa
WR		Junior Tagaloa
QB		Troy Taylor
WR		Brian Treggs
RB		Anthony Wallace
RB		Kale Wedemeyer
TE, P		Brent Woodall
RB		Greg Zomalt

Defense

Pos.	#	Name	Class
DL		Chidi Ahanotu
DL		John Bell
DL		Al Casner
DB		Darrin Greer
DL		Rhett Hall
DB		Dwayne Jones
LB		DeWayne Odom
LB		David Ortega
DB		Doug Parrish
LB		Castle Redmond
DB		Ray Sanders
LB		Dan Slevin
DB		David Wilson	So

Special teams

Pos.	#	Name	Class
K		Robbie Keen	Jr

Head coach

- Bruce Snyder

Coordinators/assistant coaches

Legend

- (C) Team captain
- (S) Suspended
- (I) Ineligible
- Injured
- Redshirt
