= 1989 Washington Huskies football team =

American college football season

1989 Washington Huskies football

Freedom Bowl, W 34–7 vs. Florida
- Conference: Pacific-10 Conference

Ranking
- Coaches: No. 20
- AP: No. 23
- Record: 8–4 (5–3 Pac-10)
- Head coach: Don James (15th season)
- Offensive coordinator: Gary Pinkel (6th season)
- Defensive coordinator: Jim Lambright (12th season)
- MVP: Bern Brostek
- Captains: Dennis Brown; Cary Conklin; Martin Harrison; Andre Riley
- Home stadium: Husky Stadium

1989 Pacific-10 Conference football standings
	Conf.					Overall
Team	W		L		T	W		L		T
No. 8 USC $	6	–	0	–	1	9	–	2	–	1
No. 23 Washington	5	–	3	–	0	8	–	4	–	0
Oregon	5	–	3	–	0	8	–	4	–	0
No. 25 Arizona	5	–	3	–	0	8	–	4	–	0
Arizona State	3	–	3	–	1	6	–	4	–	1
Oregon State	3	–	4	–	1	4	–	7	–	1
Washington State	3	–	5	–	0	6	–	5	–	0
Stanford	3	–	5	–	0	3	–	8	–	0
UCLA	2	–	5	–	1	3	–	7	–	1
California	2	–	6	–	0	4	–	7	–	0
$ – Conference champion; Rankings from AP Poll

The 1989 Washington Huskies football team was an American football team that represented the University of Washington during the 1989 NCAA Division I-A football season. In its fifteenth season under head coach Don James, the team compiled an 8–4 record, finished in a three-way tie for second place in the Pacific-10 Conference, and outscored its opponents 332 to 225. Bern Brostek was selected as the team's most valuable player. Dennis Brown, Cary Conklin, Martin Harrison, and Andre Riley were the team captains.

Washington opened with two wins, lost three straight, then won five of six to complete the regular season at 7–4.

After missing the bowl season the previous year, the Huskies traveled south to Anaheim Stadium and defeated Florida 34–7 in the Freedom Bowl. They led 27–7 at halftime and held All-American running back Emmitt Smith, a future hall of famer, to just 17 yards on seven carries in his final college game. The Huskies climbed up to #23 in the final AP poll.

== Schedule ==
Date	Time	Opponent	Rank	Site	TV	Result	Attendance	Source
September 9	12:30 p.m.	No. 15 Texas A&M*		Husky Stadium; Seattle, WA		W 19–6	69,434	
September 16	12:30 p.m.	Purdue*	No. 15	Husky Stadium; Seattle, WA		W 38–9	66,392	
September 23	7:00 p.m.	at No. 23 Arizona	No. 11	Arizona Stadium; Tucson, AZ		L 17–20	50,935	
September 30	1:00 p.m.	No. 5 Colorado*	No. 21	Husky Stadium; Seattle, WA		L 28–45	69,152	
October 7	12:30 p.m.	at No. 9 USC		Los Angeles Memorial Coliseum; Los Angeles, CA		L 16–24	58,410	
October 14	1:00 p.m.	Oregon		Husky Stadium; Seattle, WA (rivalry)		W 20–14	70,442	
October 21	1:00 p.m.	at California		California Memorial Stadium; Berkeley, CA		W 29–16	20,000	
October 28	12:30 p.m.	at UCLA		Rose Bowl; Pasadena, CA		W 28–27	48,801	
November 4	12:30 p.m.	Arizona State		Husky Stadium; Seattle, WA		L 32–34	64,695	
November 11	1:00 p.m.	at Oregon State		Parker Stadium; Corvallis, OR		W 51–14	32,147	
November 18	12:30 p.m.	Washington State		Husky Stadium; Seattle, WA (Apple Cup)		W 20–9	73,527	
December 30	11:00 a.m.	vs. Florida*		Anaheim Stadium; Anaheim, CA (Freedom Bowl)	NBC	W 34–7	33,858	
*Non-conference game; Rankings from AP Poll released prior to the game; All times are in Pacific time

== Roster ==
1989 Washington Huskies football team roster
Players
Coaches
Offense

Pos.	#	Name	Class
TE		Bill Ames
WR	5	Mario Bailey	Fr
RB	42	Jay Berry	Fr
C	60	Bern Brostek	Sr
QB	11	Mark Brunell	Fr
RB	29	Beno Bryant	Fr
RB		James Compton
QB	10	Cary Conklin (C)	Sr
OL		Adam Cooney
G	79	Ed Cunningham	So
QB	12	Billy Joe Hobert	Fr
FB	22	Matt Jones	Fr
G	56	Pete Kaligis	Fr
OL		Dean Kirkland
RB		Greg Lewis
OT	70	Siupeli Malamala	So
WR	4	Orlando McKay	So
WR		LaMarr Mitchell
OL		Jeff Pahukoa
OT	71	Pete Pierson	Fr
TE	84	Aaron Pierce	So
SE	23	Andre Riley (C)	Sr

Defense

Pos.	#	Name	Class
DB		Eric Briscoe
DT	79	Dennis Brown (C)	Sr
DB		Eugene Burkhalter
LB		James Clifford
LB	46	Brett Collins	So
DL		John Cook
DB		William Doctor
DE	90	Steve Emtman	Fr
DT	75	D'Marco Farr	Fr
CB	26	Jaime Fields	Fr
ILB	39	Chico Frahley	So
CB	5	Dana Hall	So
LB	56	Martin Harrison (C)	Sr
ILB	54	Dave Hoffman	Fr
OLB	48	Donald Jones	So
CB	6	Le-Lo Lang	Sr
CB	1	Charles Mincy	Jr
DL		Travis Richardson
LB		Greg Travis

Special teams

Pos.	#	Name	Class
K	3	John McCallum	Sr
P	27	Channing Wyles	Jr

Head coach

- Don James (15th year)

Coordinators/assistant coaches

- Gary Pinkel – OC
- Jim Lambright – DC
- Keith Gilbertson – OL
- Wayne Anderson - GA

Legend

- (C) Team captain
- (S) Suspended
- (I) Ineligible
- Injured
- Redshirt

== NFL draft ==
Six Huskies were selected in the 1990 NFL draft.

Player	Position	Round	Overall	Franchise
Bern Brostek	C	1	23	Los Angeles Rams
Dennis Brown	DT	2	47	San Francisco 49ers
Cary Conklin	QB	4	86	Washington Redskins
Le-Lo Lang	CB	5	136	Denver Broncos
Martin Harrison	DE	10	276	San Francisco 49ers
Andre Riley	WR	12	314	Cincinnati Bengals

== Notes ==
- Greg Lewis set a new University of Washington record for rushing yards in a season with 1,197 yards. This eclipsed Joe Steele's record of 1,111 yards from 1978. The record is currently held by Bishop Sankey.
- Cary Conklin set a new University of Washington record for passing yards in a season with 2,786 yards. This eclipsed Steve Pelluer's 2,365 yards from 1983. The record is currently held by Michael Penix, Jr..
