= 1989 All-Pacific-10 Conference football team =

The 1989 All-Pacific-10 Conference football team consists of American football players chosen by various organizations for All-Pacific-10 Conference teams for the 1989 college football season.

== Offensive selections ==
=== Quarterbacks ===
- Todd Marinovich, USC (1st)
- Paul Justin, Arizona St. (2nd)

=== Running backs ===
- Steve Broussard, Washington St. (1st)
- Leroy Holt, USC, (1st)
- Ricky Ervins, USC, (1st)
- Greg Lewis, Washington, (2nd)
- Pat Chaffey, Oregon St. (2nd)
- Derek Loville, Oregon, (2nd)
- David Eldridge, Arizona, (2nd)

=== Wide receivers ===
- John Jackson, USC, (1st)
- Ron Fair, Arizona St. (1st)
- Tim Stallworth, Washington St. (2nd)
- Andre Riley, Washington, (2nd)
- Terry Obee, Oregon, (2nd)

=== Tight ends ===
- Scott Galbraith, USC, (1st)
- Phil Ross, Oregon St. (2nd)

=== Tackles ===
- Brad Leggett, USC, (1st)
- Bern Brostek, Washington, (1st)
- Mark Hayes, Arizona St. (2nd)
- Curt Dykes, Oregon, (2nd)
- Bob Whitfield, Stanford, (2nd)

=== Guards ===
- Glenn Parker, Arizona, (1st)
- Brent Parkinson, USC, (1st)
- Mark Tucker, USC, (2nd)

=== Centers ===
- John Husby, Washington St., (1st)
- Frank Cornish, UCLA, (2nd)
- Paul Wulff, Washington State (2nd)

== Defensive selections ==
=== Linemen ===
- Tim Ryan, USC, (1st)
- Esera Tuaolo, Oregon St. (1st)
- Dan Owens, USC, (1st)
- Anthony Smith, Arizona, (1st)
- Mike Lodish, UCLA, (2nd)
- David Cusano, Oregon, (2nd)
- Tony Savage, Washington St. (2nd)
- Rhett Hall, California, (2nd)
- Pellom McDaniels, Oregon St, (2nd)
- Travis Richardson, Washington, (2nd)

=== Linebackers ===
- Junior Seau, USC, (1st)
- Chris Singleton, Arizona, (1st)
- Scott Ross, USC, (1st)
- Dan Grayson, Washington St. (1st)
- David Ortega, California, (1st)
- Mark Tingstad, Arizona St. (2nd)
- Marvcus Patton, UCLA, (2nd)
- Peter Brantley, Oregon, (2nd)

=== Defensive backs ===
- Chris Oldham, Oregon, (1st)
- Mark Carrier, USC, (1st)
- Jeff Hammerschmidt, Arizona, (1st)
- Nathan LaDuke, Arizona St. (1st)
- Eugene Burkhalter, Washington, (2nd)
- Larry Vladic, Oregon St. (2nd)
- Cleveland Colter, USC, (2nd)
- Darryll Lewis, Arizona, (2nd)
- Eric Turner, UCLA, (2nd)

== Special teams ==
=== Placekickers ===
- Jason Hanson, Washington St. (1st)
- Doug Pfaff, Arizona, (2nd)
- Gregg Mccollum, Oregon St. (2nd)

=== Punters ===
- Kirk Maggio, UCLA, (1st)
- Rob Myers, Washington St. (2nd)

=== Return specialists ===
- Chris Oldham, Oregon, (1st)

== See also ==
- 1989 College Football All-America Team
