= 1989 Arizona State Sun Devils football team =

American college football season

1989 Arizona State Sun Devils football
- Conference: Pacific-10 Conference
- Record: 6–4–1 (3–3–1 Pac-10)
- Head coach: Larry Marmie (2nd season)
- Home stadium: Sun Devil Stadium

1989 Pacific-10 Conference football standings
| | Conf. | | | | | Overall |
| Team | W | | L | | T | W | | L | | T |
|---|---|---|---|---|---|---|---|---|---|---|
| No. 8 USC $ | 6 | – | 0 | – | 1 | 9 | – | 2 | – | 1 |
| No. 23 Washington | 5 | – | 3 | – | 0 | 8 | – | 4 | – | 0 |
| Oregon | 5 | – | 3 | – | 0 | 8 | – | 4 | – | 0 |
| No. 25 Arizona | 5 | – | 3 | – | 0 | 8 | – | 4 | – | 0 |
| Arizona State | 3 | – | 3 | – | 1 | 6 | – | 4 | – | 1 |
| Oregon State | 3 | – | 4 | – | 1 | 4 | – | 7 | – | 1 |
| Washington State | 3 | – | 5 | – | 0 | 6 | – | 5 | – | 0 |
| Stanford | 3 | – | 5 | – | 0 | 3 | – | 8 | – | 0 |
| UCLA | 2 | – | 5 | – | 1 | 3 | – | 7 | – | 1 |
| California | 2 | – | 6 | – | 0 | 4 | – | 7 | – | 0 |
$ – Conference champion; Rankings from AP Poll

The 1989 Arizona State Sun Devils football team was an American football team that represented Arizona State University as a member of the Pacific-10 Conference (Pac-10) during the 1989 NCAA Division I-A football season. In their second season under head coach Larry Marmie, the Sun Devils compiled a 6–4–1 record (3–3–1 against Pac-10 opponents), finished in fifth place in the Pac-10, and were outscored by their opponents by a combined total of 258 to 241.

The team's statistical leaders included Paul Justin with 2,591 passing yards, David Winsley with 470 rushing yards, and Ron Fair with 1,082 receiving yards.

== Schedule ==
| Date | Opponent | Site | Result | Attendance | Source |
|---|---|---|---|---|---|
| September 9 | Kansas State* | Sun Devil Stadium; Tempe, AZ | W 31–0 | 68,606 | |
| September 16 | San Jose State* | Sun Devil Stadium; Tempe, AZ | W 28–21 | 63,849 | |
| September 23 | No. 17 Houston* | Sun Devil Stadium; Tempe, AZ | L 7–36 | 67,357 | |
| September 30 | Missouri* | Sun Devil Stadium; Tempe, AZ | W 19–3 | 64,003 | |
| October 7 | at No. 25 UCLA | Rose Bowl; Pasadena, CA | L 14–33 | 53,188 | |
| October 14 | at Oregon State | Parker Stadium; Corvallis, OR | T 17–17 | 29,239 | |
| October 21 | Oregon | Sun Devil Stadium; Tempe, AZ | L 7–27 | 67,370 | |
| October 28 | No. 23 Washington State | Sun Devil Stadium; Tempe, AZ | W 44–39 | 62,416 | |
| November 4 | at Washington | Husky Stadium; Seattle, WA | W 34–32 | 64,695 | |
| November 11 | Stanford | Sun Devil Stadium; Tempe, AZ | W 30–22 | 65,312 | |
| November 25 | Arizona | Sun Devil Stadium; Tempe, AZ (rivalry) | L 10–28 | 74,926 | |
*Non-conference game; Rankings from AP Poll released prior to the game

== Personnel ==
1989 Arizona State Sun Devils football team roster
Players
Coaches
Offense

| Pos. | # | Name | Class |
|---|---|---|---|
| WR | | Leland Adams |
| RB | | Victor Cahoon |
| RB | | Jeff Cowan |
| WR | | Ron Fair |
| RB | | Kelvin Fisher |
| OL | | Eddie Grant |
| WR | | Eric Guliford |
| RB | | Tom Harkrader |
| OL | | Mark Hayes |
| WR | | Lynn James |
| QB | | Paul Justin |
| OL | | Tim Kirby |
| QB | | Kurt Lasher |
| TE | | Ryan McReynolds |
| RB | | Bruce Perkins |
| OL | | Mike Ritter |
| OL | | Tony Sherman |
| RB | | Jeff Simoneau |
| WR | | Kevin Snyder |
| OL | | Fedel Underwood |
| QB | | Bobby Valdez |
| TE | | Scott Veach |
| RB | | David Winsley |

Defense

| Pos. | # | Name | Class |
|---|---|---|---|
| DL | | Shane Collins |
| DL | | Richard Davis |
| DB | | Floyd Fields |
| DB | | Lawrence Hubley |
| LB | | Terence Johnson |
| S | 29 | Nathan LaDuke | Jr |
| DL | | Tim Landers |
| LB | | Drew Metcalf |
| DB | | Eddie Stokes |
| LB | | Mark Tingstad |
| LB | | Darren Woodson |

Special teams

| Pos. | # | Name | Class |
|---|---|---|---|
| K | | Mike Richey |
| P | | Brad Williams |
| K | | Alan Zendejas |

Head coach

- Larry Marmie

Coordinators/assistant coaches

Legend

- (C) Team captain
- (S) Suspended
- (I) Ineligible
- Injured
- Redshirt
