= 1989 Arizona Wildcats football team =

American college football season

1989 Arizona Wildcats football

Copper Bowl champion

Copper Bowl, W 17–10 vs. NC State
- Conference: Pacific-10 Conference

Ranking
- AP: No. 25
- Record: 8–4 (5–3 Pac-10)
- Head coach: Dick Tomey (3rd season)
- Offensive coordinator: Rip Scherer (1st season)
- Defensive coordinator: Larry Mac Duff (3rd season)
- Home stadium: Arizona Stadium

1989 Pacific-10 Conference football standings
	Conf.					Overall
Team	W		L		T	W		L		T
No. 8 USC $	6	–	0	–	1	9	–	2	–	1
No. 23 Washington	5	–	3	–	0	8	–	4	–	0
Oregon	5	–	3	–	0	8	–	4	–	0
No. 25 Arizona	5	–	3	–	0	8	–	4	–	0
Arizona State	3	–	3	–	1	6	–	4	–	1
Oregon State	3	–	4	–	1	4	–	7	–	1
Washington State	3	–	5	–	0	6	–	5	–	0
Stanford	3	–	5	–	0	3	–	8	–	0
UCLA	2	–	5	–	1	3	–	7	–	1
California	2	–	6	–	0	4	–	7	–	0
$ – Conference champion; Rankings from AP Poll

The 1989 Arizona Wildcats football team represented University of Arizona during the 1989 NCAA Division I-A football season. The offense scored 248 points while the defense allowed 178 points. Led by head coach Dick Tomey in his third season, the Wildcats played to an 8–4 record (5–3 in Pac-10) and participated in the first Copper Bowl which, ironically, was held at their home stadium. The Wildcats defeated North Carolina State in the bowl game.

== Before the season ==
Arizona had completed the 1988 season with a 7–4 record, but missed out on a bowl game (likely due to losing to ranked teams as well as fewer bowls at the time). Fans believed that Tomey was building the team to success and the Wildcats entered 1989 with high expectations. The team earned a top-20 ranking in the preseason.

== Schedule ==
Date	Opponent	Rank	Site	TV	Result	Attendance	Source
September 2	Stanford	No. 18	Arizona Stadium; Tucson, AZ	KMSB	W 19–3	48,712	
September 9	at Texas Tech*	No. 20	Jones Stadium; Lubbock, TX	Prime	L 14–24	35,940	
September 16	No. 6 Oklahoma*		Arizona Stadium; Tucson, AZ	Prime	W 6–3	50,931	
September 23	No. 11 Washington	No. 23	Arizona Stadium; Tucson, AZ	Prime	W 20–17	50,935	
September 30	at Oregon	No. 17	Autzen Stadium; Eugene, OR	Prime	L 10–16	39,631	
October 14	No. 22 UCLA		Arizona Stadium; Tucson, AZ	ABC	W 42–7	51,562	
October 21	at No. 15 Washington State	No. 22	Martin Stadium; Pullman, WA	Prime	W 23–21	36,090	
October 28	Pacific (CA)*	No. 17	Arizona Stadium; Tucson, AZ	KMSB	W 38–14	46,449	
November 4	at California	No. 15	California Memorial Stadium; Berkeley, CA	ABC	L 28–29	29,000	
November 11	No. 9 USC^{†}	No. 25	Arizona Stadium; Tucson, AZ	ABC	L 3–24	52,606	
November 25	at Arizona State		Sun Devil Stadium; Tempe, AZ (rivalry)	ESPN	W 28–10	74,926	
December 31	vs. NC State*		Arizona Stadium; Tucson, AZ (Copper Bowl)	TBS	W 17–10	37,237	
*Non-conference game; ^{†}Homecoming; Rankings from AP Poll released prior to the game

== Rankings ==
Ranking movements Legend: ██ Increase in ranking ██ Decrease in ranking — = Not ranked RV = Received votes т = Tied with team above or below
	Week																
Poll	Pre	1	2	3	4	5	6	7	8	9	10	11	12	13	14	15	Final
AP	18	20	RV	23	17	RV	RV	22	17	15	25	RV	RV	RV	RV	RV	25
Coaches	—	—	RV	RV	15	RV	RV	19	16	16	RV	RV	RV	20 T	RV	RV	RV

== Game summaries ==
=== At Texas Tech ===
The Wildcats (ranked 20th) visited Texas Tech for their first road game of the season after winning against Stanford to start the year. The Red Raiders were fired up in front of their home crowd and outplayed Arizona with a rushing attack for the upset victory.

=== Oklahoma ===
Arizona battled sixth-ranked Oklahoma in a home showdown. The game was mostly dominated by the defenses of both teams and led to the Wildcats and Sooners each scoring a single field goal. Late in the fourth quarter, Arizona drove into Sooner territory, and drilled a field goal in the closing seconds for a 6–3 upset victory and avenging the Wildcats’ loss to the Sooners in the previous season. This remains the most recent meeting to date between Arizona and Oklahoma.

=== Washington ===
Riding high on their momentum after upsetting Oklahoma, the Wildcats faced off against Washington (ranked 11th). For the second game in a row, Arizona took its opponent down to the finish. They held the Huskies in check throughout most of the contest and scored a field goal as time expired to get the win. It was the Wildcats’ second consecutive win over Washington that ended on a winning kick and their first win over the Huskies at home. Also, it was the second consecutive week that Arizona won against a ranked opponent with a last-second field goal.

=== UCLA ===
After losing at Oregon, Arizona hosted UCLA (ranked 22nd). The Wildcats’ offense was too much for the Bruins, and Tomey picked up his first victory over them.

=== At Washington State ===
The Wildcats traveled to Pullman for a top-25 showdown against 15th-ranked Washington State. Arizona did enough to narrowly defeat the Cougars.

=== At California ===
Arizona traveled to Berkeley to visit California and paid their respects in the wake of the earthquake disaster that rocked the Bay Area and the nation three weeks prior. An emotional Golden Bears team would rally from behind and barely got past the 15th-ranked Wildcats. The loss ended all chances of contention for a potential Rose Bowl berth for Arizona.

=== USC ===
On homecoming day, the Wildcats hosted ninth-ranked USC and former Arizona coach Larry Smith. Arizona was no match for the Trojans’ big talent and only managed one field goal against them in a loss and Tomey was outcoached by Smith yet again. USC clinched the Pac-10 title and Rose Bowl berth with the win and prevented Arizona from getting a perfect home record.

=== At Arizona State ===
To conclude the regular season, Arizona took a trip to Arizona State for the rivalry game. In an attempt to change their fortunes against the Wildcats, the Sun Devils wore gold jerseys in the game, making their uniforms all gold.

However, in the game, ASU's uniform change didn't help any matters, as the Wildcats overcame an early deficit and dominated the second half on their way to yet another win to extend their dominance over ASU.

Wildcat players reacted to Arizona State's gold uniforms by calling them “bananas”. After the game, perhaps due to the loss, ASU decided that they would likely never wear the gold jerseys again for the foreseeable future, although they would wear them one last time in 1990 in a loss to USC. In 2021, ASU would bring back the gold jerseys in a home win over Colorado and would completely wear all-gold against USC later that year.

=== Copper Bowl (vs NC State) ===
The Wildcats played in their first bowl game under Tomey. In the inaugural Copper Bowl that was held at their home stadium, Arizona faced NC State. In front of a raucous crowd that mostly Arizona fans, the Wildcats narrowly got past the Wolfpack in a low-scoring affair. The game was played on New Year's Eve and on the final day of the 1980s before turning to the 1990s. Also, the Copper Bowl was Arizona's first bowl win in the Tomey era.

== Personnel ==
1989 Arizona Wildcats football team roster
Players
Coaches
Offense

Pos.	#	Name	Class
RB		Michael Bates
QB		Stuart Betty
OL		John Brandom
RB		David Eldridge
OL		John Fina
OL		Nick Fineanganofo
RB		Art Greathouse
TE		Richard Griffith
RB		Mario Hampton
WR		Kyle Jan
WR		Kip Lewis
QB		George Malauulu
RB		Reggie McGill
WR		Olatide Ogunfidtimi
OL		Glenn Parker
RB		Errol Sapp
RB		Melvin Smith
RB		Mike Streidnig
OL		Paul Tofflemire
QB		Ronald Veal

Defense

Pos.	#	Name	Class
LB		Zeno Alexander
DB		Todd Burden
LB		Darren Case
DL		Reggie Gaddis
DB		Scott Geyer
DL		Ken Hakes
DB		Jeff Hammerschmidt
DB		Richard Holt
DL		Reggie Johnson
DB		Darryl Lewis
LB		Arnulf Mobley
LB		Donnie Salum
LB		Chris Singleton
DL		Anthony Smith
DB		Chris Wright

Special teams

Pos.	#	Name	Class
K		Gary Coston
P		John Nies
K		Doug Pfaff

Head coach

- Dick Tomey

Coordinators/assistant coaches

Legend

- (C) Team captain
- (S) Suspended
- (I) Ineligible
- Injured
- Redshirt

== Team players drafted into the NFL ==
Player	Position	Round	Pick	NFL club
Chris Singleton	Linebacker	1	8	New England Patriots
Anthony Smith	Defensive end	1	11	Los Angeles Raiders
Glenn Parker	Tackle	3	69	Buffalo Bills
John Nies	Punter	6	154	Buffalo Bills
Donnie Salum	Linebacker	10	250	Atlanta Falcons

== Season notes ==
- The Wildcats completed the decade of the 1980s with a resurgence and built a winning success under Tomey and Smith, and continued into the 1990s with more domination.
- Arizona won four games against ranked opponents this season (the team went winless against them in 1988).
- After this season, Arizona did not play Texas Tech again until 2019.
- This was the last season in which Arizona scheduled Oklahoma. Although the Wildcats were successful for most of the 1990s, the Sooners would become a powerhouse team at the turn of the century, and by scheduling future games against each other, Arizona believed they would never defeat Oklahoma again.
- This was the last season in which the team had a large red “A” on their helmets. The “A” (which was known as the original “Block ‘A’”) would be replaced by a newer “A” in the following season, as the school wanted to energize its image to represent its academics and sports teams.
- Arizona Stadium changed its midfield logo again. It featured the current “Block ‘A’” logo with the words “Bear Down” below it in blue letters. The “Block ‘A’” (also known as the “Big ‘A’” or the “Academic ‘A’”) debuted earlier in the year and was used in tandem with the red “A” logo that used on the helmets and on top of Arizona Stadium scoreboard. In 1990, the “Block ‘A’” logo would become the university's full-time logo and appeared on the team's helmets. The older logo would continue to be used on the scoreboard until end of the 1992 season.
- The Copper Bowl was the first of only two bowl games that the Wildcats played on their home turf, with the other occurring in 1997. In addition, due to bowl games being neutral-site games, the Copper Bowl was considered a neutral game for Arizona instead of a home game, even though it was played at Arizona Stadium.
- For the first time since 1985, an Arizona player did not win the Pac-10 defensive player of the year award, ending a streak of three seasons.
- This was the last season in which Arizona's helmets featured the “Red ‘A’” on them, as they switched to helmets with the “Block ‘A’” on them in 1990. The “Red ‘A’” would continue to be used on top of the scoreboard through the 1992 season.
