= Rich Brooks =

American football player and coach (born 1941)

Biographical details
- Born: August 20, 1941 (age 85); Forest, California, U.S.

Playing career
- 1961–1963: Oregon State
- Position: Defensive back

Coaching career (HC unless noted)
- 1963: Oregon State (freshmen)
- 1964: Norte Del Rio HS (CA) (ass't)
- 1965–1969: Oregon State (DL)
- 1970: UCLA (LB)
- 1971–1972: Los Angeles Rams (ST)
- 1973: Oregon State (DC)
- 1974–1975: San Francisco 49ers (DB)
- 1976: UCLA (LB/ST)
- 1977–1994: Oregon
- 1995–1996: St. Louis Rams
- 1997–2000: Atlanta Falcons (DC)
- 2003–2009: Kentucky

Administrative career (AD unless noted)
- 1992–1994: Oregon

Head coaching record
- Overall: 130–156–4 (college); 15–19 (NFL)
- Bowls: 4–4

Accomplishments and honors

Championships
- 1 Pac-10 (1994)

Awards
- Eddie Robinson Coach of the Year (1994); Home Depot Coach of the Year Award (1994); Sporting News College Football COY (1994); Paul "Bear" Bryant Award (1994); 2× Pac-10 Coach of the Year (1979, 1994)

Richard Llewellyn Brooks (born August 20, 1941) is an American retired football coach and former player. He was the head coach at the University of Oregon from 1977 to 1994, the St. Louis Rams from 1995 to 1996, and the University of Kentucky from 2003 to 2009.

Brooks' 1994 Oregon team won the Pac-10 title and played in the 1995 Rose Bowl. For his efforts that season, he won a number of national coaching awards. The University of Oregon named the field at Autzen Stadium Rich Brooks Field in honor of his 18 seasons as coach for the Ducks.

== Education ==
Brooks attended Oregon State University in Corvallis, where he majored in physical education and played defensive back for the football team under head coach Tommy Prothro. He received his bachelor's degree in 1963 and completed his master's degree in education at Oregon State the next year. He was also a member of Phi Delta Theta fraternity at Oregon State.

== Coaching career ==
Brooks's coaching career started at Oregon State as an assistant freshman coach while working on his master's degree. After receiving his master's degree, he moved to Sacramento, California, where he accepted an assistant coaching job at Norte Del Rio High School. He soon returned to his alma mater to serve as defensive line coach for the Beavers from 1965 through 1969 under new head coach Dee Andros.

Brooks rejoined Prothro in 1970 as linebackers coach at UCLA, then followed Prothro to the Los Angeles Rams in 1971 as special teams and fundamentals coach. After two years in the NFL, Brooks returned to Oregon State to serve as defensive coordinator in 1973 under Andros, after previous DC Bud Riley left for the CFL. Brooks returned to the NFL in 1974 as defensive backs and special teams coach for the San Francisco 49ers under Dick Nolan, then went back to UCLA in 1976 to coach linebackers under first-year head coach Terry Donahue, where he helped the Bruins to a top-20 final ranking.

=== Oregon ===
Brooks accepted his first head coaching position in 1977 at the University of Oregon, Oregon State's bitter rival. At the time of his arrival, the Ducks had not had a winning season since 1970, and only one since 1965. Brooks' first contract was a four-year deal at $32,000 per year. In 1980 a scandal was exposed from the 1977–79 academic years, and the school was placed on a two-year probation (including a one-year bowl ban) by the NCAA for violations in recruiting, misuse of funds and academic standards.

Brooks's teams dominated the instate rivalry with Oregon State, compiling an overall record of 14–3–1, which kept him popular during several disappointing seasons. In 1989, he led the Ducks to a berth in the Independence Bowl—their first bowl appearance since 1963. Brooks led them to three more bowls during his tenure, becoming the first coach in school history to take the Ducks to four bowl games. (The Pac-8 did not allow a second bowl team from the conference until 1975). His best season came in 1994, when he led the Ducks to the first outright conference title in the school's 100-year football history and a berth in the Rose Bowl. That team won a then school-record tying nine games, the first time the Ducks had won that many since 1948. Brooks was named Pac-10 Coach of the Year, and also won the Paul "Bear" Bryant Award as national coach of the year.

Brooks left Oregon for the NFL after the 1994 season. His 91 wins were a school record until his successor and former offensive coordinator, Mike Bellotti, broke it in 2006; his 109 losses remain a school record. His overall record at Oregon was 18 games under .500, largely due to his first seven teams winning only 22 games combined. Nonetheless, Brooks is credited with reviving Oregon's football program and setting the stage for its rise to national prominence under Bellotti and Chip Kelly.

=== St. Louis Rams ===
On February 10, 1995, Brooks accepted a four-year contract at $625,000 per year to become the head coach of the Rams, who were preparing to move from Los Angeles to St. Louis for that season. The 1995 team got off to a 5–1 start but won just two more games down the stretch. The 1996 team languished to six wins. Brooks was fired one day after the end of the 1996 season; he had gone 13–19 in two seasons. Brooks was replaced by Dick Vermeil, who won Super Bowl XXXIV with the Rams two years later.

Brooks then spent four seasons on Dan Reeves' staff in with the Atlanta Falcons, and served as interim head coach for the final two games of the Falcons' 1998 season while Reeves was recuperating from heart surgery.

=== Kentucky ===
After two years away from the game, Brooks was hired as head coach at the University of Kentucky prior for the 2003 season. He agreed to a five-year contract at $725,000 per year. There was some controversy surrounding Brooks' hiring, since he hadn't coached at the college level in almost a decade. Brooks inherited a team that was 7–5 in 2002, but was just beginning to feel the effect of NCAA probation imposed because of recruiting violations committed by a prior Kentucky coaching staff. In Brooks' first three seasons his squads posted records of 4–8, 2–9 and 3–8 (9–25 overall, 4–20 in Southeastern Conference games).

Brooks coached the 2006 Kentucky squad to a 7–5 regular season. The Wildcats earned their first bowl bid since 1999, against Clemson in the Music City Bowl in Nashville, Tennessee where Brooks' Wildcats defeated the Tigers 28–20 for Kentucky's first bowl victory since 1984.

On December 23, 2006, Kentucky Athletics Director Mitch Barnhart announced that the university and Brooks had agreed to a contract extension for four years, plus an additional year at the university's option. Brooks' base pay was $1 million per year plus other incentives.

In 2007, the Kentucky compiled an 8–5 won-loss record overall and 3–5 in the SEC East including wins over the #1 ranked LSU Tigers and intrastate rival #8 ranked Louisville Cardinals. Kentucky rose to as high as #8 in the AP Poll. The Wildcats closed out their campaign in the 2007 Music City Bowl, this time defeating the Florida State Seminoles by a score of 35–28.

On January 18, 2008, the Kentucky athletics department announced that when Brooks chose to retire, former Kentucky player and then offensive coordinator Joker Phillips would become the football team's next head coach. No date was set for this transition, but the action was taken to provide prospective recruits assurance of a smooth transition.

In 2008, the Wildcats went 7–6, defeating favored East Carolina, the Conference USA champions, in the 2009 Liberty Bowl. Brooks became the first Kentucky coach to win bowl games in three consecutive years.

On September 30, 2009, Brooks announced on his Twitter page that he had undergone a procedure to remove skin cancer from his leg.

Brooks announced his retirement from collegiate coaching on January 4, 2010. As planned, Joker Phillips succeeded him.

After leaving the Wildcats Brooks returned to Oregon, living in Lane County near the McKenzie River. On September 23, 2016, Brooks and former UK player and Tennessee Titan Wesley Woodyard were inducted into the University of Kentucky Athletics Hall of Fame.

== Head coaching record ==
=== College ===
Year	Team	Overall	Conference	Standing	Bowl/playoffs	Coaches^{#}	AP^{°}
Oregon Ducks (Pacific-10 Conference) (1977–1994)
1977	Oregon	2–9	1–6	7th			
1978	Oregon	2–9	2–5	6th			
1979	Oregon	6–5	4–3	T–3rd			
1980	Oregon	6–3–2	4–3–1	5th			
1981	Oregon	2–9	1–6	9th			
1982	Oregon	2–8–1	2–6	9th			
1983	Oregon	4–6–1	3–3–1	T–6th			
1984	Oregon	6–5	3–5	7th			
1985	Oregon	5–6	3–4	6th			
1986	Oregon	5–6	3–5	7th			
1987	Oregon	6–5	4–4	5th			
1988	Oregon	6–6	3–5	T–6th			
1989	Oregon	8–4	5–3	T–2nd	W Independence		
1990	Oregon	8–4	4–3	3rd	L Freedom		
1991	Oregon	3–8	1–7	T–9th			
1992	Oregon	6–6	4–4	T–6th	L Independence		
1993	Oregon	5–6	2–6	T–8th			
1994	Oregon	9–4	7–1	1st	L Rose	11	11
Oregon:		91–109–4	56–79–2				
Kentucky Wildcats (Southeastern Conference) (2003–2009)
2003	Kentucky	4–8	1–7	T–5th (Eastern)			
2004	Kentucky	2–9	1–7	T–5th (Eastern)			
2005	Kentucky	3–8	2–6	6th (Eastern)			
2006	Kentucky	8–5	4–4	T–3rd (Eastern)	W Music City		
2007	Kentucky	8–5	3–5	T–4th (Eastern)	W Music City		
2008	Kentucky	7–6	2–6	6th (Eastern)	W Liberty		
2009	Kentucky	7–6	3–5	T–4th (Eastern)	L Music City		
Kentucky:		39–47	16–40				
Total:		130–156–4					
National championship Conference title Conference division title or championship game berth
^{#}Rankings from final Coaches Poll.; ^{°}Rankings from final AP Poll.

=== NFL ===
Team	Year	Regular Season					Postseason			
Team	Year	Won	Lost	Ties	Win %	Finish	Won	Lost	Win %	Result
ATL	1998	2	0	0	1.000	(interim)	–	–	–	–
ATL Total		2	0	0	1.000		–	–	–	
STL	1995	7	9	0	.438	3rd in NFC West	–	–	–	–
STL	1996	6	10	0	.375	3rd in NFC West	–	–	–	–
STL Total		13	19	0	.406		–	–	–	
Total		15	19	0	.406					
