= Tony Savage (American football) =

American football player (born 1967)

No. 79, 98
- Position: Defensive tackle

Personal information
- Born: July 7, 1967 (age 59); San Francisco, California, U.S.
- Listed height: 6 ft 3 in (1.91 m)
- Listed weight: 300 lb (136 kg)

Career information
- High school: San Francisco (CA) Archbishop Riordan
- College: Washington State
- NFL draft: 1990: 5th round, 112th overall pick

Career history
- New York Jets (1990)*; San Diego Chargers (1990–1992); Cincinnati Bengals (1992)
- * Offseason or practice squad member only

Awards and highlights
- Second Team All-Pac 10 (1989)
- Stats at Pro Football Reference

Tony Savage (born July 7, 1967) is an American former professional football defensive tackle. Savage was selected by the New York Jets in the fifth round of the 1990 NFL draft. He played for the San Diego Chargers in 1990 and 1992 and for the Cincinnati Bengals in 1992.
