= Doug Wellsandt =

American football player (born 1967)

No. 86
- Position: Tight end

Personal information
- Born: February 9, 1967 (age 59); Moses Lake, Washington, U.S.
- Listed height: 6 ft 3 in (1.91 m)
- Listed weight: 248 lb (112 kg)

Career information
- High school: Ritzville (WA)
- College: Washington State
- NFL draft: 1990: 8th round, 204th overall pick

Career history
- Cincinnati Bengals (1990)*; New York Jets (1990); Miami Dolphins (1991)
- * Offseason or practice squad member only

Career NFL statistics
- Receptions: 5
- Receiving yards: 57
- Stats at Pro Football Reference

Douglas D. Wellsandt (born February 9, 1967) is an American former professional football player who was a tight end in the National Football League (NFL). He played college football for the Washington State Cougars and was selected by the Cincinnati Bengals in the eighth round of the 1990 NFL draft with the 204th overall pick. He played for the New York Jets in 1990.
