= Greg Lewis (running back) =

American football player (born 1969)

No. 41, 20
- Position: Running back

Personal information
- Born: August 10, 1969 (age 57); Port St. Joe, Florida, U.S.
- Listed height: 5 ft 10 in (1.78 m)
- Listed weight: 214 lb (97 kg)

Career information
- High school: Ingraham (Seattle, Washington)
- College: Washington
- NFL draft: 1991: 5th round, 115th overall pick

Career history
- Denver Broncos (1991–1992); Dallas Cowboys (1993)*
- * Offseason or practice squad member only

Awards and highlights
- Doak Walker Award (1990); Chic Harley Award (1990); First-team All-American (1990); Pac-10 Offensive Player of the Year (1990); Pop Warner Trophy (1990); First-team All-Pac-10 (1990); Second Team All-Pac 10 (1989)

Career NFL statistics
- Rushing yards: 644
- Average: 3.7
- Touchdowns: 8
- Stats at Pro Football Reference

Gregory Alan Lewis (born August 10, 1969) is an American former professional football player who was a running back for the Denver Broncos of the National Football League (NFL) for two seasons in the 1990s. He played college football with the Washington Huskies and received All-American honors and the Pacific-10 Conference offensive player of the year award in 1990. Lewis was the inaugural winner of the Doak Walker Award given to the most outstanding running back in college football. He was selected by the Denver Broncos in the fifth round of the 1991 NFL draft with the 115th overall pick.

Pre-draft measurables
Height	Weight	Arm length	Hand span	40-yard dash	10-yard split	20-yard split	Vertical jump	Broad jump	Bench press
5 ft 10 1/2 in (1.79 m)	214 lb (97 kg)	31 in (0.79 m)	10 1/2 in (0.27 m)	4.61 s	1.62 s	2.69 s	39.0 in (0.99 m)	9 ft 8 in (2.95 m)	15 reps
All values from NFL Combine

== See also ==
- Washington Huskies football statistical leaders
