= Paul Richardson Sr. =

American football player (born 1969)

Paul Richardson
No. 81
- Position: Wide receiver

Personal information
- Born: February 25, 1969 (age 57); Chicago, Illinois, U.S.
- Listed height: 6 ft 3 in (1.91 m)
- Listed weight: 204 lb (93 kg)

Career information
- College: UCLA
- NFL draft: 1992: undrafted

Career history
- Los Angeles Raiders (1992)*; Green Bay Packers (1992)*; New York Jets (1993)*; Philadelphia Eagles (1993)
- * Offseason or practice squad member only

Career NFL statistics
- Receptions: 0
- Receiving yards: 0
- Receiving touchdowns: 0
- Stats at Pro Football Reference

Paul P. Richardson, Sr. (born February 25, 1969) is an American former professional football player who was a wide receiver for one season in the National Football League (NFL). He played in one game in 1993 for the Philadelphia Eagles, after being a member of offseason rosters for the Los Angeles Raiders, Green Bay Packers, and New York Jets. He played college football for the UCLA Bruins.

== Professional career ==
After going undrafted in the 1992 NFL draft, Richardson signed with the Los Angeles Raiders as a free agent. The Raiders traded him to the Green Bay Packers on July 20, 1992, to complete a previously-agreed upon trade by the two teams. He was waived by the Packers on August 11, 1992. Richardson signed with the New York Jets for the next season, but was waived on August 24, 1993.

Richardson spent the first 13 weeks of the 1993 season on the Philadelphia Eagles' practice squad. He was promoted to the active roster on December 18 with a contract through the 1994 NFL season. He played in his only career NFL game on December 19 against the Indianapolis Colts, recording no statistics. He was inactive for the remaining two games of the season, and was waived by the team on July 20, 1994.

== Personal ==
Richardson's son Paul Jr. is a wide receiver for the Washington Redskins of the NFL.
