= Frank Cornish Jr. =

American football player (born 1944)

No. 73, 76, 71, 75
- Position: Defensive tackle

Personal information
- Born: June 20, 1944 (age 82); New Orleans, Louisiana, U.S.
- Listed height: 6 ft 4 in (1.93 m)
- Listed weight: 282 lb (128 kg)

Career information
- High school: Carver (New Orleans)
- College: Grambling State
- NFL draft: 1965: 11th round, 144th overall pick
- AFL draft: 1965: Red Shirt 2nd round, 13th overall pick

Career history
- Chicago Bears (1966–1969); Cincinnati Bengals (1970); Miami Dolphins (1970–1971); Buffalo Bills (1972)

Career NFL statistics
- Fumble recoveries: 5
- Interceptions: 2
- Sacks: 10.5
- Stats at Pro Football Reference

Frank Edgar Cornish III (born June 20, 1944), generally referred to as Frank Cornish Jr., is an American former professional football player who played defensive tackle for seven seasons for the Chicago Bears, Cincinnati Bengals, Miami Dolphins, and Buffalo Bills. He played in Super Bowl VI with the Dolphins.

Cornish, who played both offensive and defensive tackle in college at Grambling State, was a starter at left offensive tackle for the Jacksonville Sharks of the World Football League (WFL) during the league's inaugural season in 1974. In a game program for a game between the Sharks and Philadelphia Bell, played on September 11, 1974, Cornish was listed at 6-foot-3, 282 pounds.

Cornish, who battled weight problems throughout his career, was suspended in August 1968 by Bears coach Jim Dooley, after Cornish weighed in at more than 330 pounds.

His son Frank Edgar Cornish IV, generally referred to as Frank Cornish, also played in the NFL. The younger Cornish died of heart disease in his sleep at his home on August 22, 2008. In Super Bowl XXVII, Cornish and his son became the first father-son combination to have appeared in a Super Bowl (he played in Super Bowl VI).
