= Scott Ross (American football) =

American football player (1968–2014)

No. 55
- Position: Linebacker

Personal information
- Born: December 7, 1968; Sacramento, California, U.S.
- Died: September 21, 2014 (aged 45); Lafayette, Louisiana, U.S.
- Listed height: 6 ft 1 in (1.85 m)
- Listed weight: 235 lb (107 kg)

Career information
- High school: El Toro (Lake Forest, California)
- College: USC (1987–1990)
- NFL draft: 1991: 11th round, 293rd overall pick

Career history
- New Orleans Saints (1991); San Antonio Riders (1992)*; Las Vegas Posse (1994)*
- * Offseason or practice squad member only

Awards and highlights
- First-team All-American (1990); 3× First-team All-Pac-10 (1988, 1989, 1990)
- Stats at Pro Football Reference

Scott M. Ross (December 7, 1968 – September 21, 2014) was an American professional football linebacker who played one season with the New Orleans Saints of the National Football League (NFL). He was selected by the Saints in the eleventh round of the 1991 NFL draft after playing college football at the University of Southern California.

== Early life and college ==
Scott M. Ross was born on December 7, 1968, in Sacramento, California. He attended El Toro High School in Lake Forest, California.

Ross was a four-year letterman for the USC Trojans of the University of Southern California from 1987 to 1990. He recorded one interception in 1989 and two interceptions in 1990. He was named first-team All-Pac-10 in 1988, 1989, and 1990. As a senior in 1990, Ross was named a first-team All-American by the American Football Coaches Association and a second-team All-American by United Press International.

== Professional career ==
Ross was selected by the New Orleans Saints in the 11th round, with the 293rd overall pick, of the 1991 NFL draft. He officially signed with the team on July 14. He was released on August 26, signed to the practice squad on August 28, promoted to the active roster on August 31, released on September 11, re-signed on October 23, released again on November 11, and signed to the practice squad again on November 12, 1991. Overall, Ross played in four games for the Saints on special teams during the 1991 season. He became a free agent after the season and re-signed with the Saints. In February 1992, the Saints allocated him to the San Antonio Riders of the World League of American Football. However, he did not end up playing for the Riders. Ross was released by the Saints on August 30, 1992.

Ross signed with the Las Vegas Posse of the Canadian Football League on April 28, 1994. He retired on May 23, 1994.

== Personal life ==
Ross died of heart failure on September 21, 2014. He is one of at least 345 NFL players to be diagnosed after death with chronic traumatic encephalopathy (CTE), which is caused by repeated hits to the head.
