= Derek Loville =

American football player (born 1968)

No. 33, 20, 31
- Position: Running back

Personal information
- Born: July 4, 1968 (age 58); San Francisco, California, U.S.
- Listed height: 5 ft 10 in (1.78 m)
- Listed weight: 210 lb (95 kg)

Career information
- High school: Riordan (San Francisco, California)
- College: Oregon
- NFL draft: 1990: undrafted

Career history
- Seattle Seahawks (1990–1991); Los Angeles Rams (1992)*; San Francisco 49ers (1993–1996); Denver Broncos (1997–1999); St. Louis Rams (2000)*
- * Offseason or practice squad member only

Awards and highlights
- 3× Super Bowl champion (XXIX, XXXII, XXXIII); 2× Second-team All-Pac-10 (1988, 1989)

Career NFL statistics
- Rushing yards: 1,620
- Rushing average: 3.5
- Rushing touchdowns: 16
- Stats at Pro Football Reference

Derek Kevin Loville (born July 4, 1968) is an American former professional football player who was a running back for nine years in the National Football League (NFL) for the Seattle Seahawks, San Francisco 49ers and Denver Broncos from 1990 to 1999. He played for Archbishop Riordan High School. Never drafted by an NFL team, Loville played college football for the Oregon Ducks and was able to find a spot on the Seahawks' roster for the first two years of his career from 1990 to 1991. Used sparingly as a back-up during his NFL playing days, Loville did manage to become a starter for a brief stint and had his best year as a pro during the 1995 season for his hometown 49ers, leading the team in rushing with 723 yards and 10 touchdowns. He also caught 87 receptions for 662 yards that year. Loville won a Super Bowl Championship in 1994 with the 49ers. He won two more Super Bowls with the Denver Broncos in 1997 and 1998.

On January 28, 2016, Loville was indicted as part of an international drug trafficking, sports gambling and money laundering ring that included making threats to debtors such as showing them beheading videos.

== NFL career statistics ==
Legend
	Won the Super Bowl
	Led the league
**Bold**	Career high

=== Regular season ===
Year	Team	Games		Rushing					Receiving				
Year	Team	GP	GS	Att	Yds	Avg	Lng	TD	Rec	Yds	Avg	Lng	TD
1990	SEA	11	1	7	12	1.7	4	0	0	0	0.0	0	0
1991	SEA	**16**	0	22	69	3.1	22	0	0	0	0.0	0	0
1994	SFO	14	0	31	99	3.2	13	0	2	26	13.0	19	0
1995	SFO	**16**	**16**	**218**	**723**	3.3	27	**10**	**87**	**662**	7.6	31	**3**
1996	SFO	12	6	70	229	3.3	16	2	16	138	8.6	**44**	2
1997	DEN	**16**	0	25	124	5.0	17	1	2	10	5.0	7	0
1998	DEN	**16**	0	53	161	3.0	12	2	2	29	**14.5**	17	0
1999	DEN	10	0	40	203	**5.1**	**36**	1	11	50	4.5	15	0
		111	23	466	1,620	3.5	36	16	120	915	7.6	44	5

=== Playoffs ===
Year	Team	Games		Rushing					Receiving				
Year	Team	GP	GS	Att	Yds	Avg	Lng	TD	Rec	Yds	Avg	Lng	TD
1994	SFO	3	0	0	0	0.0	0	0	0	0	0.0	0	0
1995	SFO	1	**1**	8	5	0.6	8	1	**7**	**70**	**10.0**	**24**	0
1996	SFO	2	0	2	-3	-1.5	0	0	0	0	0.0	0	0
1997	DEN	**4**	0	**13**	**103**	**7.9**	**44**	**2**	1	10	**10.0**	10	0
1998	DEN	3	0	12	49	4.1	11	1	0	0	0.0	0	0
		13	1	35	154	4.4	44	4	8	80	10.0	24	0
