= Terry Obee =

American football player (born 1968)

No. 89, 83
- Positions: Wide receiver, return specialist

Personal information
- Born: June 15, 1968 (age 58); Vallejo, California, U.S.
- Listed height: 5 ft 10 in (1.78 m)
- Listed weight: 190 lb (86 kg)

Career information
- High school: John F. Kennedy (Richmond, California)
- College: Oregon
- NFL draft: 1990: undrafted

Career history
- Seattle Seahawks (1990)*; Minnesota Vikings (1991); Seattle Seahawks (1992)*; Chicago Bears (1993–1994); Carolina Panthers (1996)*
- * Offseason or practice squad member only

Awards and highlights
- Second Team All-Pac 10 (1989)

Career NFL statistics
- Receptions: 26
- Receiving yards: 351
- Touchdowns: 3
- Stats at Pro Football Reference

Terry Obee is an American former professional football player and current college professor who is currently a professor of sports management at Western Kentucky University. As a football player, he was a wide receiver and kickoff returner for three seasons with the Chicago Bears and Minnesota Vikings of the National Football League (NFL). He played college football for the Oregon Ducks.
