= Brad Leggett =

American football player (born 1966)

No. 62
- Position: Center

Personal information
- Born: January 16, 1966 (age 60); Vicksburg, Mississippi, U.S.
- Listed height: 6 ft 4 in (1.93 m)
- Listed weight: 270 lb (122 kg)

Career information
- High school: Fountain Valley (Fountain Valley, California)
- College: USC
- NFL draft: 1990: 8th round, 219th overall pick

Career history
- Denver Broncos (1990)*; New Orleans Saints (1990–1991); Seattle Seahawks (1992)*; Detroit Lions (1992); New Orleans Saints (1993)*
- * Offseason or practice squad member only

Career NFL statistics
- Games played: 4
- Games started: 2
- Stats at Pro Football Reference

Brad Leggett (born January 16, 1966) is an American former professional football player who was a center in the National Football League (NFL). He played college football for the USC Trojans and was selected in the eighth round of the 1990 NFL draft by the Denver Broncos. He played in the NFL for the New Orleans Saints and Detroit Lions.

== Early life ==
Leggett was born in Vicksburg, Mississippi. His father is former NFL player (12 years) and coach (25 years) Earl Leggett. He played prep football at Fountain Valley High School in Fountain Valley, California. He is in his high school's Hall of Fame after playing football his senior year.

== College career ==
Leggett recruited by several colleges and chose to play college football college football for the USC Trojans.

During his time at the University of Southern California, Leggett was part of three PAC-10 championship teams, playing in three consecutive Rose Bowl Games. Leggett made first-team All-PAC-10 and was chosen to play in the Senior Bowl. Leggett was honorable mention All-American his senior year at USC.

== Professional career ==
Leggett was originally an eighth round selection (219th overall pick) by the Denver Broncos in the 1990 NFL draft. He played for the New Orleans Saints (1990–1991, 1993) and the Detroit Lions (1992).

Leggett and his father Earl were the first father and son to both play in the Saints franchise history. Leggett’s NFL career was derailed by back injuries forcing him to retire early.
