= Frank Cornish =

American football player (1967–2008)

No. 63, 68
- Position: Center

Personal information
- Born: September 24, 1967; Chicago, Illinois, U.S.
- Died: August 22, 2008 (aged 40); Southlake, Texas, U.S.
- Listed height: 6 ft 4 in (1.93 m)
- Listed weight: 287 lb (130 kg)

Career information
- High school: Mount Carmel (Chicago)
- College: UCLA
- NFL draft: 1990: 6th round, 143rd overall pick

Career history
- San Diego Chargers (1990–1991); Dallas Cowboys (1992–1993); Minnesota Vikings (1994); Dallas Cowboys (1994); Jacksonville Jaguars (1995); Philadelphia Eagles (1995)

Awards and highlights
- 2× Super Bowl champion (XXVII, XXVIII); NFL All-Rookie team (1990); First-team All-Pac-10 (1988); 2× Second-team All-Pac-10 (1987, 1989)

Career NFL statistics
- Games played: 69
- Games started: 21
- Stats at Pro Football Reference

Frank Edgar Cornish IV (September 24, 1967 – August 22, 2008) was an American professional football player who was a center in the National Football League (NFL) for the San Diego Chargers, Dallas Cowboys, Minnesota Vikings, Jacksonville Jaguars, and Philadelphia Eagles. He was selected by the Chargers in the sixth round of the 1990 NFL draft. He played college football for the UCLA Bruins.

== Early life ==
Cornish attended Chicago's Mount Carmel High School where he played at a middle linebacker as a freshman. The next year, he was moved to the defensive tackle. As a junior, he began to play as a two-way tackle, and was named a starter on the offensive line.

He accepted a football scholarship from the University of California, Los Angeles. As a redshirt freshman he became a starter at guard for the last four games of the 1986 season, after Jim Alexander fractured his hand.

As a sophomore, he was named the starting center. He was a three-year starter (35 games) at center and was voted the team's offensive MVP in 1989.

== Professional career ==
=== San Diego Chargers ===
Cornish was selected by the San Diego Chargers in the sixth round (143rd overall) of the 1990 NFL draft. He started all 16 games at center as a rookie. In 1991, he suffered a sprained ankle in minicamp, that allowed Courtney Hall to pass him on the depth chart and he was relegated to a backup role, seeing action mostly as the team's long snapper.

=== Dallas Cowboys (first stint) ===
On April 2, 1992, the Dallas Cowboys signed him as a Plan B free agent, reuniting with his college quarterback Troy Aikman. While starter Mark Stepnoski was involved in a contract holdout during training camp, he started throughout the preseason and for the first 2 regular season contests, becoming the first African-American center to make the team in franchise history. He also replaced an injured Stepnoski late in the third quarter of the third game against the Phoenix Cardinals. In Super Bowl XXVII, Cornish and his father became the first father-son combination to have appeared in a Super Bowl (his father played in Super Bowl VI).

In 1993, Stepnoski suffered a knee injury in the 13th game of the season against the Minnesota Vikings that required surgery. Cornish replaced him in three games, until he was passed on the depth chart by John Gesek for the Playoffs and Super Bowl XXVIII.

=== Minnesota Vikings ===
On July 11, 1994, he was signed to a one-year contract by the Minnesota Vikings to replace Adam Schreiber. He was beaten by Jeff Christy and played sparingly as the long snapper in 7 games. He was released on November 10.

=== Dallas Cowboys (second stint) ===
On November 21, 1994, he was signed by the Dallas Cowboys to provide depth on the offensive line. He was not re-signed after the season.

=== Jacksonville Jaguars ===
On August 5, 1995, he signed as a free agent with the Jacksonville Jaguars for their inaugural season. On September 18, after being allowed to carry 56 players during the first three games of the season, the team was forced to reduce its roster to 53 and released Cornish who only played on special teams.

=== Philadelphia Eagles ===
On November 21, 1995, the Philadelphia Eagles signed him as a free agent. He appeared in 2 games and wasn't re-signed after the season.

== Personal life ==
Cornish died of heart disease in his sleep at his home on August 22, 2008. Cornish lived in Southlake, Texas (near Dallas) with his wife Robin, who is a registered nurse in the Dallas area, and their five children (three daughters and two sons). His father, Frank Cornish Jr., played defensive tackle in the NFL for the Miami Dolphins and the Chicago Bears. Robin Cornish is one of the people featured in "Southlake", a podcast produced by NBC News.
