= Pat Chaffey =

American football player (born 1967)

No. 28
- Position: Running back

Personal information
- Born: April 19, 1967 (age 59); McMinnville, Oregon, U.S.
- Listed height: 6 ft 1 in (1.85 m)
- Listed weight: 220 lb (100 kg)

Career information
- High school: North Marion (Aurora, Oregon)
- College: Oregon State
- NFL draft: 1990: 5th round, 117th overall pick

Career history
- Chicago Bears (1990)*; New England Patriot (1990)*; Phoenix Cardinals (1990)*; Atlanta Falcons (1991); New York Jets (1992–1993); Green Bay Packers (1995)*
- * Offseason or practice squad member only

Awards and highlights
- Second-team All-Pac-10 (1989)

Career NFL statistics
- Rushing yards: 330
- Rushing average: 5.4
- Rushing touchdowns: 2
- Stats at Pro Football Reference

Pat Chaffey (born April 19, 1967) is an American former professional football player who was a running back in the National Football League (NFL). He played college football for the Oregon State Beavers and was selected by the Chicago Bears in the fifth round of the 1990 NFL draft. He played in 31 games over three seasons in the NFL, playing for the Atlanta Falcons in 1991 and for the New York Jets from 1992 to 1993.

Chaffey graduated from North Marion High School in Aurora, Oregon.
