= Bill Musgrave =

American football player and coach (born 1967)

New York Jets
- Title: Quarterbacks coach

Personal information
- Born: November 11, 1967 (age 58); Grand Junction, Colorado, U.S.
- Listed height: 6 ft 2 in (1.88 m)
- Listed weight: 215 lb (98 kg)

Career information
- Position: Quarterback (No. 14)
- High school: Grand Junction (CO)
- College: Oregon (1986–1990)
- NFL draft: 1991: 4th round, 106th overall pick

Career history

Playing
- Dallas Cowboys (1991)*; San Francisco 49ers (1991–1994); Denver Broncos (1995–1996); Indianapolis Colts (1998)*
- * Offseason or practice squad member only

Coaching
- Oakland Raiders (1997) Quarterbacks coach; Philadelphia Eagles (1998) Offensive assistant & interim offensive coordinator; Carolina Panthers (1999–2000) Offensive coordinator & quarterbacks coach; Virginia (2001–2002) Offensive coordinator, quarterbacks coach, & tight ends coach; Jacksonville Jaguars (2003–2004); Offensive coordinator (2003); Offensive coordinator & quarterbacks coach (2004); Washington Redskins (2005) Quarterbacks coach; Atlanta Falcons (2006–2010); Quarterbacks coach (2006–2009); Assistant head coach & quarterbacks coach (2010); Minnesota Vikings (2011–2013) Offensive coordinator; Philadelphia Eagles (2014) Quarterbacks coach; Oakland Raiders (2015–2016) Offensive coordinator; Denver Broncos (2017–2018); Quarterbacks coach & interim offensive coordinator (2017); Offensive coordinator (2018); California (2020–2022) Offensive coordinator & quarterbacks coach; Cleveland Browns (2023–2025); Senior offensive assistant (2023–2024); Quarterbacks coach (2025); New York Jets (2026–present) Quarterbacks coach

Awards and highlights
- As a player: Super Bowl champion (XXIX); First-team All-Pac-10 (1990)

Career NFL statistics
- Passing attempts: 69
- Passing completions: 43
- Completion percentage: 62.3%
- TD–INT: 1–2
- Passing yards: 402
- Passer rating: 71
- Stats at Pro Football Reference
- Coaching profile at Pro Football Reference

William Scott Musgrave (born November 11, 1967) is an American football coach and former player who is the quarterbacks coach for the New York Jets of the National Football League (NFL). He played college football for the Oregon Ducks, earning all-conference honors in the Pac-10. Musgrave is also the uncle of Green Bay Packers tight end Luke Musgrave.

Musgrave is a 21-year coaching veteran with 19 years of NFL experience as a quarterbacks coach or offensive coordinator. He has previously coached in the NFL with the Denver Broncos, Oakland Raiders, Philadelphia Eagles, Minnesota Vikings (2011–13), Atlanta Falcons, Washington Redskins, Jacksonville Jaguars, and Carolina Panthers. During his coaching career, Musgrave helped five different quarterbacks to Pro Bowl seasons: Joe Flacco (2025), Shedeur Sanders (2025), Derek Carr (2015–16), Matt Ryan (2010) and Steve Beuerlein (1999).

== Early life ==
Musgrave attended Grand Junction High School, earning All-conference honors at safety as a sophomore. The next year, he was named the starter at quarterback and earned All-conference honors in his last two seasons.

Musgrave was the Colorado High School Athlete of the Year in 1985, after registering 30 touchdown passes (a state record). He also received the Denver Post Gold Helmet Award as the state's top scholar football athlete.

== College career ==
Musgrave accepted a football scholarship from the University of Oregon, at a time when the school had only four winning seasons in the last 22 years and had not been invited to a bowl game since 1963. He became a starter as a freshman, leading his team to a No. 16 national ranking, including wins against USC and Washington.

As a sophomore, Musgrave helped Oregon achieve a top-20 ranking and a 6–1 record, until breaking his collarbone against Arizona State University. The team went winless in the last four games.

As a junior, Musgrave recorded 3,081 passing yards, 22 touchdowns, and 16 interceptions. Against BYU, he passed for a then school-record 489 yards, combining with Cougars quarterback Ty Detmer who tallied 470 passing yards, to set an NCAA record for passing yardage in a game by two players.

As a senior, Musgrave was named team MVP, first-team All-conference quarterback, GTE Academic All-American of the Year, and earned a Scholar-Athlete Award by the National Football Foundation and Hall of Fame. In his final game, Musgrave injured his shoulder in the fourth quarter against UCLA, only to return and throw a 16-yard touchdown pass with 2:10 remaining for a 28–24 victory.

Musgrave was a four-year starter at quarterback and a three-year team captain, while leading Oregon to its first bowl game in 26 years and to back-to-back bowl appearances for the first time in school history. He finished his collegiate career with 8,343 passing yards, a 57.4 passing percentage, 60 touchdowns, and 40 interceptions. Musgrave finished as the school's all-time leader in passing yards and total offense, until being broken by Marcus Mariota in 2014. He set 15 passing records, while his 60 career passing touchdowns and 8,343 career yardage ranked second only to John Elway in Pacific-10 Conference history.

In 1996, Musgrave was inducted into the Colorado High School Activities Association Hall of Fame. Four years later, he was inducted into the University of Oregon Athletics Hall of Fame.

=== College statistics ===
- 1987: 139/234 for 1,836 yards with 13 TD vs 8 INT.
- 1988: 62/121 for 815 yards with 8 TD vs 4 INT.
- 1989: 231/401 for 3,081 yards with 22 TD vs 16 INT.
- 1990: 173/301 for 2,219 yards with 14 TD vs 12 INT.

== Professional career ==
Pre-draft measurables
Height	Weight	Arm length	Hand span	40-yard dash	10-yard split	20-yard split	20-yard shuttle	Vertical jump
6 ft 2 1/4 in (1.89 m)	200 lb (91 kg)	31 1/2 in (0.80 m)	9 1/2 in (0.24 m)	4.98 s	1.77 s	2.87 s	4.27 s	30.5 in (0.77 m)
All values from NFL Combine

Musgrave was selected by the Dallas Cowboys in the fourth round (106th overall) of the 1991 NFL draft. He went into training camp with Troy Aikman, Babe Laufenberg and Cliff Stoudt at quarterback. On August 25, the Cowboys traded for Steve Beuerlein to improve the backup position and released Musgrave and Stoudt, opting to keep just two quarterbacks.

On August 28, 1991, Musgrave was signed to the practice squad by the San Francisco 49ers. He was promoted to the active roster in week 11 and made his professional debut in the week 17 game against the Chicago Bears, throwing for a touchdown and 33 yards, after replacing Steve Young late in the contest. The next year, Musgrave was the fourth-string quarterback, until being placed on the injured reserve list on December 15. In 1993 and 1994, he was named the team's third-string quarterback and was rarely activated on game days although he did appear in Super Bowl XXIX where he threw a pass for six yards. Musgrave played under head coach George Seifert and offensive coordinators Mike Holmgren and Mike Shanahan.

In 1995, Musgrave signed as a free agent with the Denver Broncos, reuniting with Shanahan, who was the team's new head coach. He was the backup quarterback behind John Elway, starting a game in 1996 against the Packers when Elway was injured before announcing his retirement on July 22, 1997.

Following a brief coaching stint as the quarterbacks coach of the Oakland Raiders, Musgrave signed with the Indianapolis Colts on April 8, 1998, but was released during training camp.

== Coaching career ==
=== 1997−1998 ===
Immediately after being released as a player, Musgrave joined the Oakland Raiders as a quarterbacks coach in 1997 under head coach Joe Bugel. When the Raiders fired Bugel following the season, Musgrave attempted another try as a player with the Colts in 1998, but was released during training camp. He was immediately hired by the Philadelphia Eagles as an offensive assistant under Ray Rhodes, a former 49ers assistant coach. Musgrave was promoted to offensive coordinator and called plays in place of Dana Bible for the final 10 games of the season. However, Musgrave was not retained by new head coach Andy Reid when Rhodes was fired at the end of the season.

=== Carolina Panthers ===
Musgrave was hired as the quarterbacks coach under George Seifert with the Carolina Panthers in 1999, in an arrangement that saw him and Seifert having a heavy hand in calling the plays over offensive coordinator Gil Haskell. Upon Haskell's departure to Seattle, Musgrave was promoted to offensive coordinator in 2000. The team chose him to replace Haskell, who was a holdover from a previous staff, due to his favorable relationship with Seifert as well as his experience calling plays the previous season. However, as an inexperienced coordinator, Musgrave had faltered at times, been criticized in the media for choices in play calling, and was at one point rumored to have been yelled at by Seifert in front of the team. Musgrave resigned from the position after three games.

=== Virginia ===
Musgrave was hired as offensive coordinator, quarterbacks coach, and tight ends coach under Al Groh for the Virginia Cavaliers in 2001, tutoring quarterback Matt Schaub to school records in his two years as coach.

=== Jacksonville Jaguars ===
Musgrave was hired as the offensive coordinator for the Jacksonville Jaguars under new head coach Jack Del Rio in 2003. In 2004, he picked up additional duties as quarterbacks coach before he was fired at the conclusion of the season.

=== Atlanta Falcons ===
Musgrave was the quarterbacks coach for the Atlanta Falcons from 2006 to 2009. In 2010, he was promoted to assistant head coach/quarterbacks coach. Coaching quarterbacks with very different skill sets, Musgrave played a large role in the development of Michael Vick (2006), Matt Schaub (2006) and Matt Ryan (2008–10).

=== Minnesota Vikings ===
Musgrave was hired by the Minnesota Vikings to the position of offensive coordinator under head coach Leslie Frazier on January 16, 2011. The Vikings posted the top-ranked rushing offense in the league over that span, and Adrian Peterson had his 2,000 rushing yards season and received the AP NFL Offensive Player of the Year Award in 2012. After three seasons with the Vikings, Musgrave was not retained by new head coach Mike Zimmer after the 2013 season.

=== Philadelphia Eagles ===
Musgrave was hired by the Philadelphia Eagles as the team's quarterbacks coach on January 27, 2014. The Eagles finished sixth in the league in passing offense (272.3 ypg) despite splitting time between two quarterbacks. Nick Foles and Mark Sanchez started eight games apiece for the Eagles and combined to throw for 4,581 yards—a total topped by only five NFL quarterbacks that season.

=== Oakland Raiders ===
Musgrave was hired by head coach Jack Del Rio for a second time, on January 19, 2015, to serve as offensive coordinator. Musgrave took over an offense that ranked last in the NFL in total offense (282.2 ypg) and 31st in scoring (15.9 ppg) in 2014. The Raiders made the biggest offensive improvement in the NFL in yards per game (+91.1) and scoring (+10.2 ppg) in two seasons under Musgrave, finishing in the top seven in the league in both categories in 2016 (373.3 ypg/26.0 ppg). The Raiders' offensive resurgence was spurred by the development of quarterback Derek Carr, who in two seasons in Musgrave's offense passed for nearly 8,000 yards to go along with 60 touchdowns.

On January 10, 2017, Musgrave's contract was not renewed, and he was let go by head coach Jack Del Rio after losing to the Houston Texans in the Wild Card Round.

=== Denver Broncos ===
Musgrave was hired by the Broncos on January 13, 2017, to serve as the quarterbacks coach under new head coach Vance Joseph. He was promoted to offensive coordinator following the firing of offensive coordinator Mike McCoy on November 20, 2017. The Broncos posted a 6–10 record during the 2018–19 season. Musgrave's offense finished ranked 19th in total yards, 12th in rushing yards, and 19th in passing yards.

Following the 2018–19 season, the Broncos hired Vic Fangio as head coach, who did not retain Musgrave.

=== California ===
On January 3, 2020, Musgrave was announced as the offensive coordinator for the California Golden Bears, replacing Beau Baldwin and marking his return to the college ranks after 18 years. Musgrave was let go on November 13, 2022, after the Golden Bears lost their sixth game in a row to Oregon State.

=== Cleveland Browns ===
On February 26, 2023, Musgrave was hired as a senior offensive assistant for the Cleveland Browns under head coach Kevin Stefanski.

Musgrave was promoted to the role of quarterbacks coach on January 28, 2025.

=== New York Jets ===
On February 10, 2026, the New York Jets hired Musgrave as their quarterbacks coach under offensive coordinator Frank Reich.
