= Chris Oldham =

American football player (born 1968)

No. 42, 28, 26, 27, 24
- Position: Cornerback

Personal information
- Born: October 26, 1968 (age 58); Sacramento, California, U.S.
- Listed height: 5 ft 9 in (1.75 m)
- Listed weight: 200 lb (91 kg)

Career information
- High school: Sacramento (CA) Highlands
- College: Oregon
- NFL draft: 1990: 4th round, 105th overall pick

Career history
- Detroit Lions (1990); Buffalo Bills (1991); Phoenix Cardinals (1991); San Antonio Riders (1992); San Diego Chargers (1992)*; Phoenix/Arizona Cardinals (1992–1994); Pittsburgh Steelers (1995–1999); New Orleans Saints (2000–2001)
- * Offseason or practice squad member only

Awards and highlights
- First-team All-American (1989); First-team All-Pac-10 (1988)

Career NFL statistics
- Tackles: 215
- Interceptions: 10
- Sacks: 15
- Stats at Pro Football Reference

Christopher Martin Oldham (born October 26, 1968) is an American former professional football player who was a cornerback for 12 seasons in the National Football League (NFL) for the Detroit Lions, Buffalo Bills, Phoenix / Arizona Cardinals, Pittsburgh Steelers, and New Orleans Saints. He played college football for the Oregon Ducks and was selected by the Lions in the fourth round of the 1990 NFL draft with the 105th overall pick. Oldham graduated from Highlands High School in 1986.
