= 1989 NCAA Division I-A football rankings =

- Season: 1989
- Bowl season: 1989–90 bowl games
- Preseason No. 1: Michigan
- End of season champions: Miami (FL)

Two human polls comprised the 1989 National Collegiate Athletic Association (NCAA) Division I-A football rankings. Unlike most sports, college football's governing body, the NCAA, does not bestow a national championship, instead that title is bestowed by one or more different polling agencies. There are two main weekly polls that begin in the preseason—the AP Poll and the Coaches Poll.

== Legend ==
	Increase in ranking
	Decrease in ranking
	Not ranked previous week
	National champion
(#–#)	Win–loss record
(Italics)	Number of first place votes
т	Tied with team above or below also with this symbol

== AP Poll ==
The AP poll expanded to 25 teams in 1989.

	Preseason Aug 28	Week 1 Sep 5	Week 2 Sep 12	Week 3 Sep 19	Week 4 Sep 26	Week 5 Oct 3	Week 6 Oct 10	Week 7 Oct 17	Week 8 Oct 24	Week 9 Oct 31	Week 10 Nov 7	Week 11 Nov 14	Week 12 Nov 21	Week 13 Nov 28	Week 14 Dec 5	Week 15 Dec 12	Week 16 (Final) Jan 3	
1.	Michigan (23)	Notre Dame (1–0) (31)	Notre Dame (1–0) (37)	Notre Dame (2–0) (57)	Notre Dame (3–0) (57)	Notre Dame (4–0) (57)	Notre Dame (5–0) (54)	Notre Dame (6–0) (52)	Notre Dame (7–0) (56)	Notre Dame (8–0) (58)	Notre Dame (9–0) (56)	Notre Dame (10–0) (57)	Notre Dame (11–0) (57)	Colorado (11–0) (53)	Colorado (11–0) (55)	Colorado (11–0) (51)	Miami (FL) (11–1) (38)	1.
2.	Notre Dame (20)	Michigan (0–0) (18)	Michigan (0–0) (15)	Miami (FL) (2–0) (3)	Miami (FL) (3–0) (3)	Miami (FL) (4–0) (3)	Miami (FL) (5–0) (4)	Miami (FL) (6–0) (3)	Miami (FL) (6–0) (3)	Colorado (8–0) (2)	Colorado (9–0) (4)	Colorado (10–0) (3)	Colorado (11–0) (3)	Alabama (10–0) (2)	Miami (FL) (10–1) (4)	Miami (FL) (10–1) (4)	Notre Dame (12–1) (19)	2.
3.	Nebraska (10)	Miami (FL) (0–0) (4)	Miami (FL) (1–0) (5)	Nebraska (2–0)	Nebraska (3–0)	Colorado (4–0)	Colorado (5–0) (2)	Colorado (6–0) (3)	Colorado (7–0) (1)	Nebraska (8–0)	Michigan (7–1)	Michigan (8–1)	Michigan (9–1)	Michigan (10–1) (1)	Michigan (10–1) (1)	Michigan (10–1) (1)	Florida State (10–2) (2)	3.
4.	Miami (FL) (4)	Nebraska (0–0) (6)	Nebraska (1–0) (3)	Auburn (2–0)	Auburn (2–0)	Nebraska (4–0)	Nebraska (5–0)	Nebraska (6–0)	Nebraska (7–0)	Michigan (6–1)	Alabama (8–0)	Alabama (9–0)	Alabama (10–0)	Miami (FL) (10–1) (3)	Notre Dame (11–1)	Notre Dame (11–1)	Colorado (11–1)	4.
5.	USC (1)	Auburn (0–0)	Auburn (1–0)	Michigan (0–1)	Colorado (3–0)	Michigan (2–1)	Michigan (3–1)	Michigan (4–1)	Michigan (5–1)	Alabama (7–0)	Florida State (7–2)	Florida State (7–2)	Florida State (8–2)	Notre Dame (11–1)	Florida State (9–2)	Florida State (9–2)	Tennessee (11–1)	5.
6.	Florida State (2)	UCLA (0–0)	Oklahoma (2–0)	Colorado (3–0)	Michigan (1–1)	Tennessee (4–0)	Tennessee (5–0)	Tennessee (5–0)	Alabama (6–0)	Florida State (6–2)	Nebraska (8–1)	Nebraska (9–1)	Nebraska (10–1)	Florida State (8–2)	Nebraska (10–1)	Nebraska (10–1)	Auburn (10–2)	6.
7.	LSU	Arkansas (0–0)	Clemson (2–0)	Clemson (3–0)	Clemson (4–0)	Arkansas (3–0)	Arkansas (4–0)	Arkansas (5–0)	Pittsburgh (5–0–1)	Miami (FL) (6–1)	Miami (FL) (7–1)	Miami (FL) (8–1)	Miami (FL) (9–1)	Nebraska (10–1)	Alabama (10–1)	Alabama (10–1)	Michigan (10–2)	7.
8.	Auburn	Oklahoma (1–0)	Colorado (2–0)	Arkansas (1–0)	Arkansas (2–0)	Pittsburgh (3–0–1)	Houston (4–0)	Pittsburgh (5–0–1)	Illinois (5–1)	Illinois (6–1)	Illinois (7–1)	USC (8–2)	Tennessee (8–1)	Tennessee (9–1)	Tennessee (10–1)	Tennessee (10–1)	USC (9–2–1)	8.
9.	UCLA	Colorado (1–0)	Arkansas (0–0)	West Virginia (3–0)	West Virginia (4–0)	USC (3–1) т	Pittsburgh (4–0–1)	USC (5–1)	Florida State (5–2)	USC (6–2)	USC (7–2)	Tennessee (7–1)	Arkansas (8–1)	Arkansas (9–1)	Auburn (9–2)	Auburn (9–2)	Alabama (10–2)	9.
10.	Arkansas	Clemson (1–0)	Illinois (1–0)	Syracuse (2–0)	Pittsburgh (3–0)	West Virginia (4–0–1) т	USC (4–1)	Alabama (5–0)	USC (5–2)	Tennessee (6–1)	Arkansas (7–1)	Arkansas (8–1)	Auburn (8–2)	Illinois (9–2)	Arkansas (10–1)	Arkansas (10–1)	Illinois (10–2)	10.
11.	Penn State (1)	Illinois (1–0)	Syracuse (1–0)	Washington (2–0)	USC (2–1)	Auburn (2–1)	Alabama (4–0)	Auburn (4–1)	Tennessee (5–1)	Arkansas (6–1)	Tennessee (6–1)	Auburn (7–2)	Illinois (8–2)	Auburn (8–2)	Illinois (9–2)	Illinois (9–2)	Nebraska (10–2)	11.
12.	Clemson	Penn State (0–0)	West Virginia (2–0)	USC (1–1)	Tennessee (3–0)	Houston (3–0)	Auburn (3–1)	NC State (6–0)	Houston (5–1)	Auburn (5–2)	Auburn (6–2)	Illinois (7–2)	USC (8–2–1)	USC (8–2–1)	USC (8–2–1)	USC (8–2–1)	Clemson (10–2)	12.
13.	Syracuse	USC (0–1)	USC (0–1)	Pittsburgh (2–0)	Alabama (2–0)	Alabama (3–0)	NC State (6–0)	Illinois (4–1)	Arkansas (5–1)	West Virginia (6–1–1)	Penn State (6–2)	Houston (7–2)	Houston (7–2)	Houston (8–2)	Houston (9–2)	Houston (9–2)	Arkansas (10–2)	13.
14.	Colorado	Syracuse (0–0)	Pittsburgh (2–0)	Tennessee (3–0)	Houston (2–0)	NC State (5–0)	Clemson (5–1)	Florida State (4–2)	Penn State (5–1)	Pittsburgh (5–1–1)	Pittsburgh (5–1–1)	Texas A&M (7–2)	Texas A&M (7–2)	Clemson (9–2)	Clemson (9–2)	Clemson (9–2)	Houston (9–2)	14.
15.	Oklahoma	Texas A&M (1–0)	Washington (1–0)	Alabama (1–0)	NC State (4–0)	Clemson (4–1)	Oklahoma (4–1)	Washington State (6–1)	West Virginia (5–1–1)	Arizona (6–2)	Houston (6–2)	Clemson (8–2)	Clemson (9–2)	Virginia (10–2)	Virginia (10–2)	Virginia (10–2)	Penn State (8–3–1)	15.
16.	Alabama	Florida State (0–1)	Alabama (0–0)	Oklahoma (2–1)	Oklahoma (2–1)	Oklahoma (3–1)	Illinois (3–1)	Houston (4–1)	Auburn (4–2)	Penn State (5–2)	Texas A&M (7–2)	Virginia (9–2)	Virginia (10–2)	Texas A&M (7–3)	Texas A&M (8–3)	Texas A&M (8–3)	Michigan State (8–4)	16.
17.	West Virginia	West Virginia (1–0)	Tennessee (2–0)	Houston (1–0)	Arizona (3–1)	Syracuse (2–1)	Air Force (6–0) т	Penn State (5–1)	Arizona (5–2)	Houston (5–2)	Clemson (8–2)	Penn State (6–2–1)	West Virginia (7–2–1)	West Virginia (8–2–1)	West Virginia (8–2–1)	West Virginia (8–2–1)	Pittsburgh (8–3–1)	17.
18.	Arizona	Southern Miss (1–0)	Houston (1–0)	NC State (3–0)	Syracuse (2–1)	Illinois (2–1)	Washington State (5–1) т	West Virginia (4–1–1)	BYU (6–1)	NC State (7–1)	Virginia (8–2)	West Virginia (7–2–1)	Texas Tech (8–2)	Penn State (7–3–1)	Penn State (7–3–1)	Penn State (7–3–1)	Virginia (10–3)	18.
19.	BYU	Alabama (0–0)	NC State (2–0)	Washington State (3–0)	Washington State (4–0)	Texas A&M (3–1)	Florida State (3–2)	Air Force (6–1)	Florida (6–1)	Florida (6–1)	West Virginia (6–2–1)	Pittsburgh (5–2–1)	Pittsburgh (6–2–1)	BYU (10–2)	BYU (10–2)	BYU (10–2)	Texas Tech (9–3)	19.
20.	Pittsburgh	Arizona (1–0)	UCLA (0–1)	Illinois (1–1)	Illinois (2–1)	Air Force (5–0)	West Virginia (4–1–1)	Florida (5–1)	NC State (6–1)	Texas A&M (6–2)	Florida (6–2)	Texas Tech (7–2)	Ohio State (8–2)	Duke (8–3)	Duke (8–3)	Duke (8–3)	Texas A&M (8–4)	20.
21.	Houston	LSU (0–1)	LSU (0–1)	Texas A&M (2–1)	Washington (2–1)	Washington State (4–1)	Michigan State (2–2)	BYU (5–1)	Texas A&M (5–2)	Clemson (7–2)	BYU (7–2)	BYU (8–2)	BYU (9–2)	Ohio State (8–3)	Ohio State (8–3)	Ohio State (8–3)	West Virginia (8–3–1)	21.
22.	Illinois	Houston (1–0)	Texas A&M (1–1)	Oregon (2–0)	Texas A&M (2–1)	Florida State (2–2)	UCLA (3–2)	Arizona (4–2)	Clemson (6–2)	Texas (4–2)	NC State (7–2)	Ohio State (7–2)	Penn State (6–3–1)	Michigan State (7–4)	Michigan State (7–4)	Michigan State (7–4)	BYU (10–3)	22.
23.	Iowa	Pittsburgh (1–0)	Washington State (2–0)	Arizona (2–1)	Georgia (2–0)	Oregon (3–1)	Penn State (4–1)	Texas A&M (4–2)	Washington State (6–2)	BYU (6–2)	Texas Tech (6–2)	Fresno State (10–0)	Duke (8–3)	Hawaii (9–2)	Hawaii (9–2)	Pittsburgh (7–3–1)	Washington (8–4)	23.
24.	NC State	BYU (1–0)	Iowa (0–0)	UCLA (1–1)	Air Force (4–0)	Michigan State (1–2)	South Carolina (4–1–1)	South Carolina (4–1–1)	Texas (4–2)	Virginia (7–2)	Fresno State (9–0)	Hawaii (8–2)	Hawaii (8–2)	Pittsburgh (6–3–1)	Pittsburgh (7–3–1)	Texas Tech (8–3)	Ohio State (8–4)	24.
25.	Ohio State	NC State (1–0)	Mississippi State (2–0)	Ohio State (1–0)	Florida State (2–2)	UCLA (2–2)	BYU (4–1) т; Florida (4–1) т	Oklahoma (4–2)	South Carolina (5–1–1)	Fresno State (8–0)	Arizona (6–3)	Duke (7–3)	Michigan State (6–4)	Texas Tech (8–3)	Texas Tech (8–3)	Hawaii (9–2–1)	Arizona (8–4)	25.
	Preseason Aug 28	Week 1 Sep 5	Week 2 Sep 12	Week 3 Sep 19	Week 4 Sep 26	Week 5 Oct 3	Week 6 Oct 10	Week 7 Oct 17	Week 8 Oct 24	Week 9 Oct 31	Week 10 Nov 7	Week 11 Nov 14	Week 12 Nov 21	Week 13 Nov 28	Week 14 Dec 5	Week 15 Dec 12	Week 16 (Final) Jan 3	
		Dropped: Iowa; Ohio State	Dropped: Arizona; BYU; Florida State; Penn State; Southern Miss	Dropped: Iowa; LSU; Mississippi State	Dropped: Ohio State; Oregon; UCLA	Dropped: Arizona; Georgia; Washington	Dropped: Oregon; Syracuse; Texas A&M	Dropped: Clemson; Michigan State; UCLA	Dropped: Air Force; Oklahoma	Dropped: South Carolina; Washington State	Dropped: Texas	Dropped: Arizona; Florida; NC State	Dropped: Fresno State	None	None	None	Dropped: Duke; Hawaii	

== Coaches Poll ==
	Preseason Aug 19	Week 1 Sep 5	Week 2 Sep 12	Week 3 Sep 19	Week 4 Sep 26	Week 5 Oct 3	Week 6 Oct 10	Week 7 Oct 17	Week 8 Oct 24	Week 9 Oct 31	Week 10 Nov 7	Week 11 Nov 14	Week 12 Nov 21	Week 13 Nov 28	Week 14 Dec 5	Week 15 (Final) Jan 3	
1.	Notre Dame (30)	Notre Dame (1–0) (34)	Notre Dame (1–0) (39)	Notre Dame (2–0) (45)	Notre Dame (3–0) (43)	Notre Dame (4–0) (47)	Notre Dame (5–0) (42)	Notre Dame (6–0) (41)	Notre Dame (7–0) (45)	Notre Dame (8–0) (47)	Notre Dame (9–0) (45)	Notre Dame (10–0) (45)	Notre Dame (11–0) (43)	Colorado (11–0) (39)	Colorado (11–0) (42)	Miami (FL) (11–1) (36)	1.
2.	Nebraska (8)	Nebraska (0–0) (1)	Miami (FL) (1–0) (2)	Miami (FL) (2–0) (3)	Miami (FL) (3–0) (4)	Miami (FL) (4–0) (2)	Miami (FL) (5–0) (5)	Miami (FL) (6–0) (5)	Miami (FL) (6–0) (3)	Colorado (8–0) (2)	Colorado (9–0) (5)	Colorado (10–0) (4)	Colorado (11–0) (4)	Alabama (10–0) (4)	Miami (FL) (10–1) (4)	Florida State (10–2) (7)	2.
3.	Auburn	USC (0–0) (1)	Nebraska (1–0) (1)	Nebraska (2–0) т	Nebraska (3–0) (1)	Nebraska (4–0) (1)	Nebraska (5–0) (1)	Colorado (6–0) (1)	Colorado (7–0) (1)	Nebraska (8–0) (1)	Alabama (8–0)	Alabama (9–0)	Alabama (10–0)	Miami (FL) (10–1) (3)	Michigan (10–1)	Notre Dame (12–1) (6)	3.
4.	USC (3)	Auburn (0–0)	Auburn (1–0)	Auburn (2–0) т	Auburn (2–0) (1)	Colorado (4–0)	Colorado (5–0) (1)	Nebraska (6–0) (1)	Nebraska (7–0) (1)	Alabama (7–0)	Florida State (7–2)	Michigan (8–1)	Michigan (9–1)	Michigan (10–1) (2)	Notre Dame (11–1)	Colorado (11–1)	4.
5.	Miami (FL) (1)	Miami (FL) (0–0)	Michigan (0–0) (7)	Colorado (3–0)	Colorado (3–0)	Tennessee (4–0)	Tennessee (5–0)	Tennessee (5–0)	Alabama (6–0)	Florida State (6–2)	Michigan (7–1)	Florida State (7–2)	Florida State (8–2)	Notre Dame (11–1)	Florida State (9–2) (1)	Tennessee (11–1)	5.
6.	Florida State (1)	Michigan (0–0) (8)	Clemson (2–0)	Clemson (3–0)	Clemson (4–0)	Arkansas (3–0)	Arkansas (4–0)	Arkansas (5–0)	Michigan (5–1)	Miami (FL) (6–1)	Nebraska (8–1)	Nebraska (9–1)	Nebraska (10–1)	Florida State (8–2) (1)	Nebraska (10–1)	Auburn (10–2)	6.
7.	Michigan (7)	UCLA (0–0)	Colorado (2–0)	Michigan (0–1)	Michigan (1–1)	Michigan (2–1)	Michigan (3–1)	Michigan (4–1)	Pittsburgh (5–0–1)	Michigan (6–1)	Miami (FL) (7–1)	Miami (FL) (8–1)	Miami (FL) (9–1)	Nebraska (10–1)	Alabama (10–1)	Alabama (10–2)	7.
8.	UCLA	Arkansas (0–0)	Arkansas (0–0)	Arkansas (1–0)	Arkansas (2–0)	West Virginia (4–0–1)	Alabama (4–0)	Alabama (5–0)	Florida State (5–2)	Illinois (6–1)	Illinois (7–1)	USC (8–2)	Tennessee (8–1)	Tennessee (9–1)	Tennessee (10–1)	Michigan (10–2)	8.
9.	LSU	Clemson (1–0)	West Virginia (2–0)	West Virginia (3–0)	West Virginia (4–0)	USC (3–1)	Pittsburgh (4–0–1)	Pittsburgh (5–0–1)	Illinois (5–1)	USC (6–2)	USC (7–2)	Arkansas (8–1)	Arkansas (8–1)	Arkansas (9–1)	Arkansas (10–1)	USC (9–2–1)	9.
10.	Arkansas	Penn State (0–0)	Syracuse (1–0)	Washington (2–0)	Pittsburgh (3–0)	Alabama (3–0) т	USC (4–1)	USC (5–1)	USC (5–2)	Tennessee (6–1)	Tennessee (6–1) т	Tennessee (7–1)	Auburn (8–2)	Auburn (8–2)	Auburn (9–2)	Illinois (10–2)	10.
11.	Clemson	Colorado (0–0)	Illinois (1–0)	Tennessee (3–0)	USC (2–1)	Auburn (2–1) т	Auburn (3–1)	Auburn (4–1)	Arkansas (5–1)	Arkansas (6–1)	Arkansas (7–1) т	Auburn (7–2)	Illinois (8–2)	Illinois (9–2)	Illinois (9–2)	Clemson (10–2)	11.
12.	Penn State	Texas A&M (1–0)	Washington (1–0)	Alabama (1–0)	Tennessee (3–0)	Pittsburgh (3–0–1)	NC State (6–0)	NC State (6–0)	Tennessee (5–1)	West Virginia (6–1–1)	Auburn (6–2)	Illinois (7–2)	USC (8–2–1)	USC (8–2–1)	USC (8–2–1)	Nebraska (10–2)	12.
13.	West Virginia	West Virginia (1–0)	Alabama (0–0)	Syracuse (2–0)	Alabama (2–0)	NC State (5–0)	Clemson (5–1)	Florida State (4–2)	Penn State (5–1)	Auburn (5–2)	Penn State (6–2)	Clemson (8–2)	Clemson (9–2)	Clemson (9–2)	Clemson (9–2)	Arkansas (10–2)	13.
14.	Colorado	Alabama (0–0)	Pittsburgh (2–0)	Pittsburgh (2–0)	NC State (4–0)	Clemson (4–1)	Air Force (6–0)	Washington State (6–1)	West Virginia (5–1–1)	Pittsburgh (5–1–1)	Pittsburgh (5–1–1)	Virginia (9–2)	Virginia (10–2)	Virginia (10–2)	Virginia (10–2)	Penn State (8–3–1)	14.
15.	Alabama	Syracuse (0–0)	NC State (2–0)	USC (1–1)	Arizona (3–1)	Air Force (5–0)	Illinois (3–1)	Illinois (4–1)	Auburn (4–2)	NC State (7–1)	Clemson (8–2)	Texas A&M (7–2)	Texas A&M (7–2)	BYU (10–2)	Texas A&M (8–3)	Virginia (10–3)	15.
16.	Syracuse	Florida State (0–1)	USC (0–1)	NC State (3–0)	Washington State (4–0)	Washington State (4–1)	Washington State (5–1) т	Penn State (5–1)	Arizona (5–2)	Arizona (6–2)	Texas A&M (7–2)	Penn State (6–2–1)	BYU (9–2)	West Virginia (8–2–1)	BYU (10–2)	Texas Tech (9–3) т	16.
17.	Georgia	BYU (1–0)	Tennessee (2–0)	Washington State (3–0)	Washington (2–1)	Illinois (2–1)	Florida State (3–2) т	Air Force (6–1)	NC State (6–1)	Penn State (5–2)	Virginia (8–2)	BYU (8–2)	Texas Tech (8–2)	Texas A&M (7–3)	West Virginia (8–2–1)	Michigan State (8–4) т	17.
18.	BYU	Southern Miss (1–0)	Air Force (2–0)	Oregon (2–0)	Georgia (2–0)	Texas A&M (3–1)	West Virginia (4–1–1)	West Virginia (4–1–1)	BYU (6–1)	Clemson (7–2)	BYU (7–2)	Pittsburgh (5–2–1)	Ohio State (8–2)	Penn State (7–3–1)	Penn State (7–3–1)	BYU (10–3)	18.
19.	Iowa	LSU (0–1)	Georgia (0–0)	Air Force (3–0)	Air Force (4–0)	Syracuse (2–1)	Hawaii (5–1) т	Arizona (4–2)	Clemson (6–2)	Texas A&M (6–2) т	West Virginia (6–2–1) т	Texas Tech (7–2)	West Virginia (7–2–1)	Hawaii (9–2)	Hawaii (9–2) т	Pittsburgh (7–3–1)	19.
20.	Washington	Georgia (0–0)	UCLA (0–1)	Georgia (1–0) т; Ohio State (1–0) т	Florida State (2–2)	Hawaii (4–1) т; Florida State (2–2) т	Michigan State (2–2) т	BYU (5–1)	Florida (6–1)	Texas (4–2) т	Texas Tech (6–2) т	West Virginia (7–2–1)	Pittsburgh (6–2–1)	Ohio State (8–3) т; Arizona (7–4) т	Texas Tech (8–3) т	Washington (8–4)	20.
	Preseason Aug 19	Week 1 Sep 5	Week 2 Sep 12	Week 3 Sep 19	Week 4 Sep 26	Week 5 Oct 3	Week 6 Oct 10	Week 7 Oct 17	Week 8 Oct 24	Week 9 Oct 31	Week 10 Nov 7	Week 11 Nov 14	Week 12 Nov 21	Week 13 Nov 28	Week 14 Dec 5	Week 15 (Final) Jan 3	
		Dropped: Iowa; Washington	Dropped: Penn State; Texas A&M; Florida State; BYU; Southern Miss; LSU	Dropped: Illinois; UCLA	Dropped: Syracuse; Oregon; Ohio State	Dropped: Arizona; Washington; Georgia	Dropped: Texas A&M; Syracuse	Dropped: Clemson; Hawaii; Michigan State	Dropped: Washington State; Air Force	Dropped: BYU; Florida	Dropped: NC State; Arizona; Texas	None	Dropped: Penn State	Dropped: Texas Tech; Pittsburgh	Dropped: Ohio State; Arizona	Dropped: Texas A&M; West Virginia; Hawaii	
