= 1989–90 NCAA football bowl games =

College football postseason game series

- Season: 1989
- Number of bowls: 18
- Bowl games: December 9, 1989 – January 1, 1990
- National Championship: 1990 Sugar Bowl
- Location of Championship: Louisiana Superdome, New Orleans, Louisiana
- Champions: Miami Hurricanes
Bowl record by conference
Conference	Bowls	Record	Number of teams in final AP poll
Independents	8	6–2 (0.750)	6
SEC	6	3–3 (0.500)	3
Pac-10	4	4–0 (1.000)	3
Big Ten	4	2–2 (0.500)	4
ACC	4	2–2 (0.500)	2
SWC	3	1–2 (0.333)	4
WAC	3	0–3 (0.000)	1
Big Eight	2	0–2 (0.000)	2
Big West	1	1–0 (1.000)	0
MAC	1	0–1 (0.000)	0

The 1989–90 NCAA football bowl games were a series of post-season games played in December 1989 and January 1990 to end the 1989 NCAA Division I-A football season. A total of 18 team-competitive games, and two all-star games, were played. The post-season began with the California Bowl on December 9, 1989, and concluded on January 20, 1990, with the season-ending Senior Bowl.

== Schedule ==
Date	Game	Site	Time (US EST)	TV	Matchup (pre-game record)	AP pre-game rank	UPI (Coaches) pre-game rank
12/9	California Bowl	Bulldog Stadium; Fresno, California		SportsChannel	Fresno State 27 (10–1) (Big West Champion), Ball State 6 (7–2–2) (MAC Champion)	NR; NR	NR; NR
12/16	Independence Bowl	Independence Stadium; Shreveport, Louisiana		Mizlou	Oregon 27 (7–4) (Pac-10), Tulsa 24 (6–5) (Independent)	NR; NR	NR; NR
12/25	Aloha Bowl	Aloha Stadium; Honolulu, Hawaii		ABC	Michigan State 33 (7–4) (Big Ten), Hawaii 13 (9–2–1) (WAC)	#22 #25	NR #19
12/28	Liberty Bowl	Liberty Bowl Memorial Stadium; Memphis, Tennessee		Raycom Sports	Ole Miss 42 (7–4) (SEC), Air Force 29 (8–3–1) (WAC)	NR; NR	NR; NR
12/28	All-American Bowl	Legion Field; Birmingham, Alabama		ESPN	Texas Tech 49 (8–3) (SWC), Duke 21 (8–3) (ACC)	#24 #20	#19; NR
12/29	Holiday Bowl	Jack Murphy Stadium; San Diego, California		ESPN	Penn State 50 (7–3–1) (Independent), BYU 39 (10–2) (WAC Champion)	#18 #19	#18 #16
12/30	Gator Bowl	Gator Bowl Stadium; Jacksonville, Florida		ESPN	Clemson 27 (9–2) (ACC), West Virginia 7 (8–2–1) (Independent)	#14 #17	#13 #17
12/30	John Hancock Bowl	Sun Bowl; El Paso, Texas		CBS	Pittsburgh 31 (7–3–1) (Independent), Texas A&M 28 (8–3) (SWC)	#24 #16	NR #15
12/30	Peach Bowl	Fulton County Stadium; Atlanta		ABC	Syracuse 19 (7–4) (Independent), Georgia 18 (6–5) (SEC)	NR; NR	NR; NR
12/30	Freedom Bowl	Anaheim Stadium; Anaheim, California		NBC	Washington 34 (7–4) (Pac-10), Florida 7 (7–4) (SEC)	NR; NR	NR; NR
12/31	Copper Bowl	Arizona Stadium; Tucson, Arizona		TBS	Arizona 17 (7–4) (Pac-10), NC State 10 (7–4) (ACC)	NR; NR	NR; NR
1/1	Hall of Fame Bowl	Tampa Stadium; Tampa, Florida	1:00 PM	NBC	Auburn 31 (9–2) (SEC), Ohio State 14 (8–3) (Big Ten)	#9 #21	#10; NR
1/1	Florida Citrus Bowl	Florida Citrus Bowl; Orlando, Florida	1:30 PM	ABC	Illinois 31 (9–2) (Big Ten), Virginia 21 (10–2) (ACC)	#11 #15	#11 #14
1/1	Cotton Bowl Classic	Cotton Bowl; Dallas, Texas	1:30 PM	CBS	Tennessee 31 (10–1) (SEC), Arkansas 27 (10–1) (SWC Champion)	#8 #10	#8 #9
1/1	Fiesta Bowl	Sun Devil Stadium; Tempe, Arizona	4:30 PM	NBC	Florida State 41 (9–2) (Independent), Nebraska 17 (10–1) (Big Eight)	#5 #6	#5 #6
1/1	Rose Bowl	Rose Bowl; Pasadena, California	5:00 PM	ABC	USC 17 (8–2–1) (Pac-10 Champion), Michigan 10 (10–1) (Big Ten Champion)	#12 #3	#12 #3
1/1	Sugar Bowl	Louisiana Superdome; New Orleans, Louisiana	8:30 PM	ABC	Miami (FL) 33 (10–1) (Independent), Alabama 25 (10–1) (SEC Champion)	#2 #7	#2 #7
1/1	Orange Bowl	Miami Orange Bowl; Miami	8:00 PM	NBC	Notre Dame 21 (11–1) (Independent), Colorado 6 (11–0) (Big Eight Champion)	#4 #1	#4 #1
