= Bill Curry =

American football player (born 1942)

No. 50, 55
- Positions: Center, linebacker

Personal information
- Born: October 21, 1942 (age 84); College Park, Georgia, U.S.
- Listed height: 6 ft 3 in (1.91 m)
- Listed weight: 235 lb (107 kg)

Career information
- High school: College Park
- College: Georgia Tech (1961–1964)
- NFL draft: 1964: 20th round, 279th overall pick
- AFL draft: 1964: 23rd round, 183rd overall pick

Career history

Playing
- Green Bay Packers (1965–1966); Baltimore Colts (1967–1972); Houston Oilers (1973); Los Angeles Rams (1974)

Coaching
- Georgia Tech (1976) Offensive line coach; Green Bay Packers (1977–1979) Offensive line coach; Georgia Tech (1980–1986) Head coach; Alabama (1987–1989) Head coach; Kentucky (1990–1996) Head coach; Georgia State (2010–2012) Head coach

Awards and highlights
- As a player: 2× Super Bowl champion (I, V); 3× NFL champion (1965, 1966, 1968); Second-team All-Pro (1969); 2× Pro Bowl (1971, 1972); Second-team All-American (1964); As a coach: Bobby Dodd Coach of the Year Award (1989); Amos Alonzo Stagg Award (2007); ACC Coach of the Year (1985); 2× SEC Coach of the Year (1987, 1989)

Career NFL statistics
- Games played: 123
- Games started: 86
- Fumble recoveries: 4
- Stats at Pro Football Reference

Head coaching record
- Postseason: 2–3 (.400)
- Career: 93–128–4 (.422)

William Alexander Curry (born October 21, 1942) is an American former football player and coach. He played professionally as a center in the National Football League (NFL). He later became a college football head coach.

He played college ball for the Georgia Tech Yellow Jackets (1962–1964) and then played in the NFL for ten seasons with four teams: the Green Bay Packers (1965–1966), the Baltimore Colts (1967–1972), the Houston Oilers (1973), and the Los Angeles Rams (1974).

After his playing career, Curry was the head coach at Georgia State University, which began competing in college football in 2010. Previously, Curry served as the head football coach at the Georgia Institute of Technology (1980–1986), the University of Alabama (1987–1989), and the University of Kentucky (1990–1996). Between coaching jobs at Kentucky and Georgia State, Curry was a football analyst for ESPN.

== Early life and playing career ==
Curry was born in College Park, Georgia. A 1965 graduate from the Georgia Institute of Technology with a degree in industrial management, Curry starred at center for the Georgia Tech Yellow Jackets football team from 1962 to 1964 under legendary coach Bobby Dodd.

He was selected as a future draft choice by the Green Bay Packers in the final round (twentieth) of the 1964 NFL draft. As a rookie, he was an NFL Champion for the 1965 Green Bay Packers. In his second year, he was the starting center for Green Bay in their 35-10 Super Bowl I victory at the Los Angeles Coliseum.

Curry was selected by the New Orleans Saints in the 1967 NFL expansion draft on February 9 after he was left unprotected by Vince Lombardi who chose to keep Ken Bowman as the Packers' new starting center. Curry never saw action for the Saints who traded him one month later on March 6 to the Baltimore Colts along with three draft picks, one of which was that year's first overall selection (Bubba Smith), in exchange for Gary Cuozzo, Butch Allison and a 1967 seventeenth rounder. The request to include Curry in the transaction was made by Colts head coach Don Shula who admired his special teams versatility. Through his tremendous work ethic and tenacity, Curry slowly developed into a first rate NFL center. He was the Colts' starting center during their NFL Championship season of 1968, and was viewed as a reliable force on the offensive line, and a team leader as well.

Like most of his Colts teammates, he remains bewildered by their stunning 16–7 loss in Super Bowl III at the hands of Joe Namath and the New York Jets in Miami's Orange Bowl. The Colts had finished the 1968 season with a record of 13–1 and avenged their only loss that year with a 34–0 devastation of the Cleveland Browns in the NFL Championship contest. They were heavy favorites to defeat the upstart Jets of the upstart AFL when disaster struck: after carrying the play to New York for most of the first quarter, due to an interception in the Jets' end zone, and two missed field goals, Baltimore had nothing to show for it. Trailing 7–0 late in the first half, and feeling the pressure, the Colts attempted a flea-flicker to help reverse their fortunes. However, after having caught the Jets' defense completely unaware, QB Earl Morrall failed to spot WR Jimmy Orr wide open near the end zone, and instead threw a wobbly pass underneath that was intercepted. In retrospect, this was Baltimore's one last golden opportunity to get back into the game. It was particularly dispiriting for Curry, who, having no one to block due to the Jets biting hard on the initial hand-off, had a perfect view of Orr and was sure the play would result in a touchdown. "I looked up, and saw Jimmy open, I don't know what (could've) happened." he said. To add insult to injury, following the loss, Curry and his teammates were subjected to unusually harsh criticisms, including unsubstantiated claims that they had somehow thrown the game.

The Colts did go on to win Super Bowl V and the veteran team made a valiant defense of that title, which ended, along with the (owner) Carroll Rosenbloom era, with a loss to Don Shula's Dolphins at the Orange Bowl in the 1971 AFC title game.

After ownership of the Colts was transferred to Bob Irsay the team's championship spirit, which was emblematic of the franchise under Rosenbloom's reign, was dissolved by newly installed GM Joe Thomas. Curry's close confidant, and Colts legend, John Unitas was unceremoniously benched in 1972, and many of those responsible for the franchise's success in years past were shipped out of Baltimore—Curry among them. He was dealt from the Colts to the Houston Oilers for Tom Regner and a 1973 third-round selection (61st overall–Bill Olds) on January 29, 1973. He learned that he was traded via a collect call from Thomas at the Pro Bowl in Dallas.

During a brief stint with the flagging Houston Oilers in 1973, Curry suffered a catastrophic leg injury when he was hit in the back of the leg by Rams' great, Merlin Olsen. Though he did not retire until August 1975, the injury essentially ended his playing career.

Curry's NFL career is also notable for his efforts in leadership positions (including a stint as president) at the NFLPA. Though their fledgling efforts at self-assertion were largely unsuccessful, it can be argued that men like Curry and Colts teammate John Mackey laid the groundwork for the vastly improved wages and working conditions that exist for NFL players today. Both were among the fifteen plaintiffs in Mackey v. National Football League in which Judge Earl R. Larson declared that the Rozelle rule was a violation of antitrust laws on December 30, 1975.

== Coaching career ==
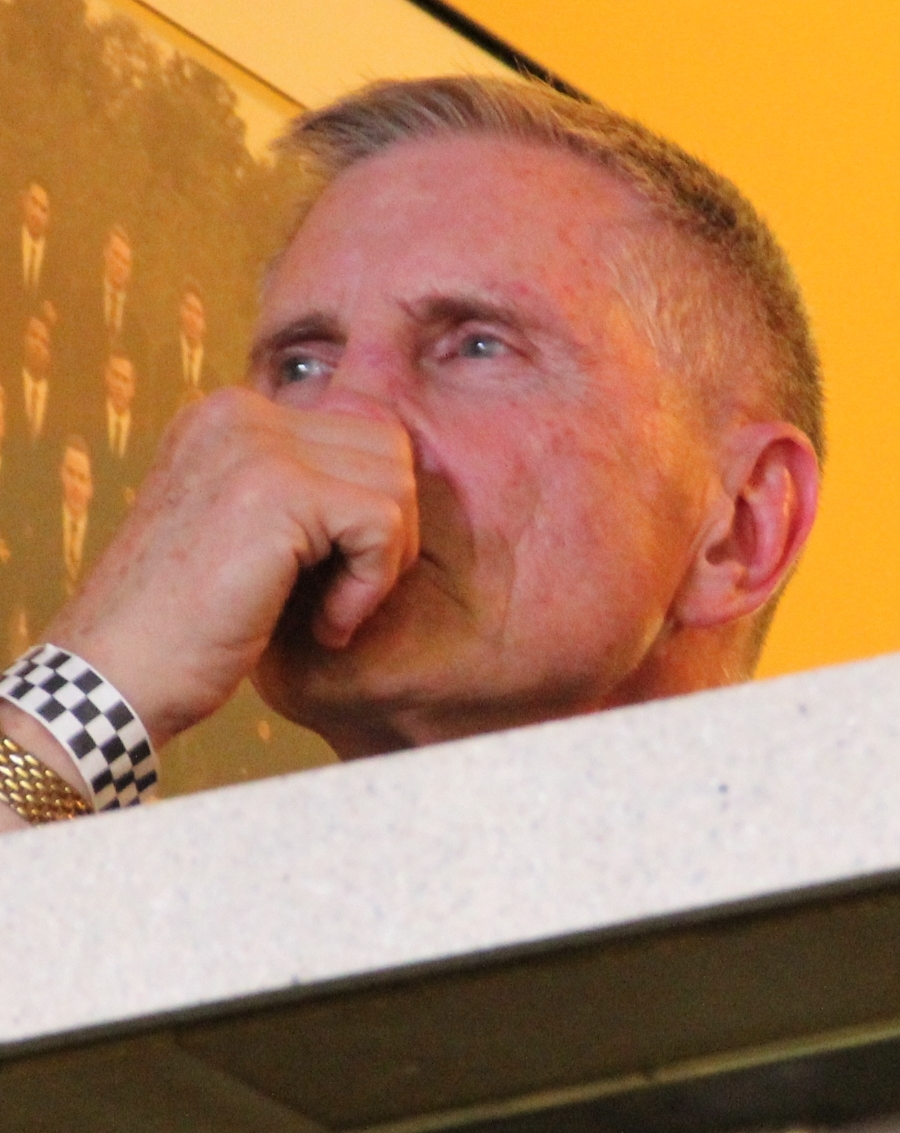
Bill Curry in 2013.

Prior to his first head coaching assignment, Curry served as an assistant at Georgia Tech in 1976 and then for three seasons in the NFL (1977–1979) as Offensive Line Coach with the Green Bay Packers.

Curry returned to Georgia Tech in 1980 as head football coach to replace Pepper Rodgers. It has been reported that one of Curry's first head coaching decision was to dismiss the quarterbacks coach, Steve Spurrier, which supposedly had Spurrier holding a long grudge over it.

Curry led his team to a 9–2–1 record in 1985 and a win in the All-American Bowl. For his efforts, he was named the ACC Coach of the Year in 1985 by the Associated Press and the Atlantic Coast Conference media. Curry posted a 34–43–4 record over seven years at his alma mater, including winning seasons in 1982 (6–5), 1984 (6–4–1), and 1985 (9–2–1) and won the All-American Bowl.

Curry then accepted a job as head coach at the University of Alabama. There he posted a record of 26–10, won a share of the Southeastern Conference (SEC) title in 1989 and made bowl appearances every year of his three-year tenure. In September 1988, he refused to fly his Alabama team to play Texas A&M because of fears that Hurricane Gilbert would harm his players. The hurricane never reached Texas A&M at College Station, Texas, which saw Curry subject to ridicule and criticism from A&M coach Jackie Sherrill that he was doing it to try and dodge the team with their quarterback being hurt with a knee injury. The game was rescheduled for December 1, when Alabama routed A&M, 30–10. Curry also suspended Alabama quarterback Jeff Dunn for breaking team rules prior to the 1988 Sun Bowl against Army.

After posting a 10–1 regular season record (the only blemish being a third loss in a row to Auburn), Curry's 1989 Crimson Tide squad shared the SEC title with Auburn and Tennessee—Alabama's first SEC title since 1981—and earned the berth in the 1990 Sugar Bowl, where they lost to the Miami Hurricanes, 33–25. Curry was honored in 1989 as the SEC Coach of the Year and received the Bobby Dodd Coach of the Year Award.

Curry's three-year record of 26–10 gave him the highest winning percentage among Alabama coaches to that point since the retirement of Bear Bryant. However, Curry had an 0–3 record against Auburn. Indeed, he would never beat the Tigers in 12 tries during his career. Perhaps his best-remembered on-field act with Alabama came during the 1990 Sugar Bowl, when he castigated receiver Prince Wimbley for celebrating a first down against Miami with a dance. Curry called Wimbley to the sideline, grabbed him by the jersey, and lectured him. As ABC game cameras showed, Wimbley turned away and Curry grabbed his face mask and brought him into eye-to-eye contact. During Curry's time in Tuscaloosa, he was subject to intense scrutiny from the fanbase, famously having an Alabama fan throw a brick through his office window following a 1988 loss to Ole Miss.

In early 1990, Alabama tendered Curry a new contract which contained provisions he disliked, including no raise and removal of his power to hire and fire assistants. Curry was particularly upset by this since he had led the Tide to a share of its first SEC title and its first major-bowl appearance since the Bryant era. He responded by accepting an offer to become the head coach at the University of Kentucky.

In 1993, Curry's Wildcat squad posted a 6–5 regular season record and earned a spot in the Peach Bowl, Kentucky's first bowl game in nine years. The Wildcats lost that game to Clemson, 14–13. As it turned out, this would be his only non-losing record in seven seasons in Lexington. His 1994 team only went 1–10, still the worst in modern Wildcat football history. Curry was asked to step down after the 1996 season and was succeeded by Hal Mumme.

Curry joined ESPN in 1997 as a college football game analyst. His primary assignment was the ESPN2 College Football Saturday Night telecast, along with selected bowl games. After 10 years away from the sideline, Curry was chosen as Georgia State University's first head football coach in 2008, and retired after three seasons.

== Personal life ==
Curry is a Christian. Curry is married to his grade school sweetheart Carolyn Curry. They have two children and seven grandchildren.

== Head coaching record ==
Year	Team	Overall	Conference	Standing	Bowl/playoffs	Coaches^{#}	AP^{°}
Georgia Tech Yellow Jackets (NCAA Division I-A independent) (1980–1982)
1980	Georgia Tech	1–9–1					
1981	Georgia Tech	1–10					
1982	Georgia Tech	6–5					
Georgia Tech Yellow Jackets (Atlantic Coast Conference) (1983–1986)
1983	Georgia Tech	3–8	3–2	3rd			
1984	Georgia Tech	6–4–1	2–2–1	5th			
1985	Georgia Tech	9–2–1	5–1	2nd	W All-American	18	19
1986	Georgia Tech	5–5–1	3–3	4th			
Georgia Tech:		31–43–4	13–8–1				
Alabama Crimson Tide (Southeastern Conference) (1987–1989)
1987	Alabama	7–5	4–2	4th	L Hall of Fame		
1988	Alabama	9–3	4–3	4th	W Sun	17	17
1989	Alabama	10–2	6–1	T–1st	L Sugar	7	9
Alabama:		26–10	14–6				
Kentucky Wildcats (Southeastern Conference) (1990–1996)
1990	Kentucky	4–7	3–4	6th			
1991	Kentucky	3–8	0–7	10th			
1992	Kentucky	4–7	2–6	5th (Eastern)			
1993	Kentucky	6–6	4–4	3rd (Eastern)	L Peach		
1994	Kentucky	1–10	0–8	6th (Eastern)			
1995	Kentucky	4–7	2–6	5th (Eastern)			
1996	Kentucky	4–7	3–5	4th (Eastern)			
Kentucky:		26–52	14–40				
Georgia State Panthers (NCAA Division I FCS independent) (2010–2011)
2010	Georgia State	6–5					
2011	Georgia State	3–8					
Georgia State Panthers (Colonial Athletic Association) (2012)
2012	Georgia State	1–10	1–7				
Georgia State:		10–23					
Total:		93–128–4					
National championship Conference title Conference division title or championship game berth
^{#}Rankings from final Coaches Poll.; ^{°}Rankings from final AP Poll.
