= Gary Darnell =

American football player and coach (born 1948)

Biographical details
- Born: October 15, 1948 (age 78); Waldron, Arkansas, U.S.

Playing career
- 1966–1969: Oklahoma State
- Position: Linebacker

Coaching career (HC unless noted)
- 1970: Oklahoma State (GA)
- 1971–1972: Oklahoma State (LB)
- 1973–1975: SMU (LB)
- 1976–1977: North Carolina (LB)
- 1978–1982: Kansas State (AHC/DC)
- 1983–1985: Tennessee Tech
- 1986–1987: Wake Forest (AHC/DC)
- 1988–1989: Florida (DC)
- 1989: Florida (interim HC)
- 1990–1991: Notre Dame (AHC/DC)
- 1992–1993: Texas (AHC/ST)
- 1994–1996: Texas (AHC/DC)
- 1997–2004: Western Michigan
- 2006–2007: Texas A&M (DC)
- 2007: Texas A&M (interim HC)
- 2017: Nebraska (def. consultant)

Head coaching record
- Overall: 52–80
- Bowls: 0–2

Accomplishments and honors

Championships
- 2 MAC West Division (1999–2000)

Gary Brent Darnell (born October 15, 1948) is an American former college football player and coach. He served as the head football coach at Tennessee Technological University from 1983 to 1985 and Western Michigan University from 1997 to 2004 and was interim head football coach at the University of Florida for seven games in 1989 and at Texas A&M University for one game in 2007, compiling a career head coaching record of 52–80. Darnell had stints at a defensive coordinator at Kansas State University, Wake Forest University, Florida, the University of Notre Dame, the University of Texas at Austin and Texas A&M.

== Playing career ==
A native of Arkansas, Darnell attended Oklahoma State University as a personal management major and played as a linebacker for the Oklahoma State Cowboys football team. As a senior in 1969, he earned All-Big Eight Conference honors. Darnell also holds the Big 8 single-game tackle record of 27 tackles against Arkansas in 1969. He earned a Bachelor of Arts degree in 1969 and again remained with the Oklahoma State football team as a graduate assistant.

== Assistant and interim head coaching career ==
In 1971, he was hired on a full-time basis as the linebackers coach. He later joined the coaching staffs at Southern Methodist University and the University of North Carolina at Chapel Hill under the same position.

In 1978, Darnell became assistant head coach and defensive coordinator at Kansas State University. Darnell and the new staff turned around a program that went 0–11 in 1977, taking them to the Independence Bowl in 1982, Kansas State's first bowl appearance.

In 1986, Darnell joined the staff of Al Groh at Wake Forest University as assistant head coach and defensive coordinator. He spent two years with the Demon Deacons before accepting the same position at the University of Florida in 1988. In each of his two seasons at Florida, his defenses ranked third nationally and first in the Southeastern Conference. In the middle of the 1989 season, he took as interim head coach after Galen Hall was forced to resign, leading the Gators to a 3–4 record over the season's final seven games.

In 1990, he accepted a position under Lou Holtz at the University of Notre Dame as assistant head coach and defensive coordinator. Darnell was replacing Barry Alvarez, who left to take the head coaching job at the University of Wisconsin–Madison. He later joined John Mackovic's staff at the University of Texas at Austin as assistant head coach and special teams coordinator in 1992. Two years later, he moved from special teams to defensive coordinator, serving in that position through the 1996 season. He then moved on to become Western Michigan University's head coach in 1997.

=== Texas A&M ===
Darnell was hired as the defensive coordinator at Texas A&M University by head coach Dennis Franchione for the 2006 season. Franchione had previously served as Darnell's offensive coordinator at Tennessee Tech in 1983 and 1984. Inheriting a team that finished 107th in total defense and 97th in scoring defense, Darnell implemented a quick turnaround, with the 2006 team finishing 37th in total defense and 32nd in scoring defense. A day after head coach Dennis Franchione resigned, A&M athletic director Bill Byrne named Darnell the interim head coach. Darnell coached the Aggies in the 2007 Alamo Bowl, which was Darnell's 12th bowl to coach.

== Head coaching career ==
=== Tennessee Tech ===
After his success at Kansas State, Darnell was hired as head coach at Tennessee Technological University in 1983 where his success as a defensive coach was not duplicated. In his three years with Tennessee Tech, Darnell compiled a 3–29 record.

=== Western Michigan ===
Darnell was hired in 1997 by Western Michigan University as head coach. Inheriting a team that finished 2–9 in 1996, Darnell led a six-game turnaround to 8–3, the largest turnaround among NCAA teams in 1997. Western Michigan entered the 1998 season with a seven-game winning streak, the fourth-longest in the nation. The 1998 squad finished with a 7–4 overall record. In 1999, the Broncos clinched the Mid-American Conference West Division title on their way to a 7–5 overall record. The following year, the Broncos repeated as West Division champions with the fourth-best scoring defense in the nation, were ranked as high as 27th in the national polls, and held an eight-game winning streak, the longest at Western Michigan in forty-one years. For his efforts, Darnell was named the Mid-American Conference Coach of the Year in 2000.

Following the 2000 season, Darnell became a top candidate for several head coaching positions at BCS conference schools, including Missouri, North Carolina, Rutgers, and Oklahoma State. He ultimately signed a five-year extension to remain at WMU. Darnell's last four seasons at Western Michigan were less successful, with the team posting a combined 15–31 record and without a winning season. Darnell was fired after the 2004 season, and the remaining year left on his contract was bought out by the university. He finished his eight-year tenure at Western Michigan with an overall record of 46–46. Darnell spent the 2005 season out of coaching.

== Head coaching record ==
Year	Team	Overall	Conference	Standing	Bowl/playoffs
Tennessee Tech Golden Eagles (Ohio Valley Conference) (1983–1985)
1983	Tennessee Tech	2–8	2–5	T–6th	
1984	Tennessee Tech	0–11	0–7	8th	
1985	Tennessee Tech	1–10	1–6	7th	
Tennessee Tech:		3–29	3–18		
Florida Gators (Southeastern Conference) (1989)
1989	Florida	3–4 (Note: Galen Hall served as Florida's head coach for the first five games of the 1989 season before resigning. Darnell was appointed interim head coach for the remainder of the year. Florida finished the season with an overall record of 7–5 and a mark of 4–3 in conference play.)	2–2	T–4th	L Freedom
Florida:		3–4	2–2		
Western Michigan Broncos (Mid-American Conference) (1997–2004)
1997	Western Michigan	8–3	6–2	2nd (West)	
1998	Western Michigan	7–4	5–3	3rd (West)	
1999	Western Michigan	7–5	6–2	1st (West)	
2000	Western Michigan	9–3	7–1	1st (West)	
2001	Western Michigan	5–6	4–4	4th (West)	
2002	Western Michigan	4–8	3–5	5th (West)	
2003	Western Michigan	5–7	4–4	4th (West)	
2004	Western Michigan	1–10	0–8	7th (West)	
Western Michigan:		46–46	35–29		
Texas A&M Aggies (Big 12 Conference) (2007)
2007	Texas A&M	0–1 (Note: Dennis Franchione served as Texas A&M's head coach for 2007 regular season before resigning. Darnell was appointed interim head coach the team's bowl game. Texas A&M finished the year with an overall record of 7–6 and a mark of 4–4 in conference play, placing in a three-way tie for third in the Southern Division of the Big 12 Conference.)			L Alamo
Texas A&M:		0–1	0–0		
Total:		52–80			
National championship Conference title Conference division title or championship game berth

== See also ==
- List of Oklahoma State University people
