= 1989 Ole Miss Rebels football team =

American college football season

1989 Ole Miss Rebels football

Liberty Bowl, W 42–29 vs. Air Force
- Conference: Southeastern Conference
- Record: 8–4 (4–3 SEC)
- Head coach: Billy Brewer (7th season)
- Offensive coordinator: Red Parker (2nd season)
- Defensive coordinator: Robert Henry (2nd season)
- Home stadium: Vaught–Hemingway Stadium; Mississippi Veterans Memorial Stadium

1989 Southeastern Conference football standings
| | Conf. | | | | | Overall |
| Team | W | | L | | T | W | | L | | T |
|---|---|---|---|---|---|---|---|---|---|---|
| No. 5 Tennessee + | 6 | – | 1 | – | 0 | 11 | – | 1 | – | 0 |
| No. 9 Alabama + | 6 | – | 1 | – | 0 | 10 | – | 2 | – | 0 |
| No. 6 Auburn + | 6 | – | 1 | – | 0 | 10 | – | 2 | – | 0 |
| Florida | 4 | – | 3 | – | 0 | 7 | – | 5 | – | 0 |
| Ole Miss | 4 | – | 3 | – | 0 | 8 | – | 4 | – | 0 |
| Georgia | 4 | – | 3 | – | 0 | 6 | – | 6 | – | 0 |
| Kentucky | 2 | – | 5 | – | 0 | 6 | – | 5 | – | 0 |
| LSU | 2 | – | 5 | – | 0 | 4 | – | 7 | – | 0 |
| Mississippi State | 1 | – | 6 | – | 0 | 5 | – | 6 | – | 0 |
| Vanderbilt | 0 | – | 7 | – | 0 | 1 | – | 10 | – | 0 |
+ – Conference co-champions; Rankings from AP Poll

The 1989 Ole Miss Rebels football team represented the University of Mississippi as a member of the Southeastern Conference during the 1989 NCAA Division I-A football season. Led by seventh-year head coach Billy Brewer, the Rebels compiled an overall record of 8–4 with a mark of 4–3 in conference play, and finished tied for fifth place in the SEC.

== Schedule ==
| Date | Time | Opponent | Site | TV | Result | Attendance | Source |
|---|---|---|---|---|---|---|---|
| September 2 | 7:00 pm | at Memphis State* | Liberty Bowl Memorial Stadium; Memphis, TN (rivalry) | | W 20–13 | 59,795 | |
| September 9 | 11:30 am | at Florida | Ben Hill Griffin Stadium; Gainesville, FL | TBS | W 24–19 | 70,014 | |
| September 16 | 1:00 pm | Arkansas State* | Vaught–Hemingway Stadium; Oxford, MS | | W 34–31 | 29,000 | |
| September 23 | 6:00 pm | No. 8 Arkansas* | Mississippi Veterans Memorial Stadium; Jackson, MS (rivalry) | | L 17–24 | 55,000 | |
| October 7 | 1:00 pm | No. 13 Alabama | Mississippi Veterans Memorial Stadium; Jackson, MS (rivalry) | | L 27–62 | 55,000 | |
| October 14 | 11:30 am | Georgia | Vaught–Hemingway Stadium; Oxford, MS | TBS | W 17–13 | 31,000 | |
| October 21 | 7:00 pm | at Tulane* | Louisiana Superdome; New Orleans, LA (rivalry) | | W 32–28 | 39,291 | |
| October 28 | 1:00 pm | Vanderbilt^{†} | Vaught–Hemingway Stadium; Oxford, MS (rivalry) | | W 24–16 | 34,500 | |
| November 4 | 1:00 pm | LSU | Vaught–Hemingway Stadium; Oxford, MS (rivalry) | | L 30–35 | 42,354 | |
| November 18 | 2:00 pm | at No. 9 Tennessee | Neyland Stadium; Knoxville, TN (rivalry) | | L 21–33 | 93,851 | |
| November 25 | 1:00 pm | vs. Mississippi State | Mississippi Veterans Memorial Stadium; Jackson, MS (Egg Bowl) | | W 21–11 | 43,218 | |
| December 28 | 7:00 pm | vs. Air Force* | Liberty Bowl Memorial Stadium; Memphis, TN (Liberty Bowl) | Raycom | W 42–29 | 60,128 | |
*Non-conference game; ^{†}Homecoming; Rankings from AP Poll released prior to the game; All times are in Central time

== Personnel ==
1989 Ole Miss Rebels football team roster
Players
Coaches
Offense

| Pos. | # | Name | Class |
|---|---|---|---|
| RB | | Dwayne Amos |
| RB | | Tyrone Ashley |
| RB | | Randy Baldwin |
| OL | | Tim Brown |
| WR | | Pat Coleman |
| QB | | John Darnell |
| OL | | Mike Easton |
| TE | | Rich Gebbia |
| WR | | Willie Green |
| WR | | Reid Hines |
| WR | | Jeffrey Holder |
| OL | | Everett Lindsay |
| OL | | Lee Lott |
| QB | | Tom Luke | Fr |
| RB | | Ronnie McKinney |
| WR | | John Moore |
| OL | | Dawson Pruett |
| OL | | Jeff Rhodes |
| TE | | Camp Roberts |
| RB | | Maurice Shaw |
| QB | | Russ Shows | Fr |
| OL | | Adrian Strother |
| RB | | Scott Swatzell |
| RB | | Ed Thigpen |
| RB | | Jim Earl Thomas |
| TE | | Daniel Westmoreland |

Defense

| Pos. | # | Name | Class |
|---|---|---|---|
| LB | | Tony Bennett |
| DB | | Danny Boyd |
| LB | | Shawn Cobb |
| DB | | Chauncey Godwin |
| LB | | Roger Hancock |
| LB | | Pete Harris |
| DL | | Doug Jacobs |
| LB | | Phillip Kent |
| DL | | Jim Lentz |
| DB | | Chris Mitchell |
| DB | 38 | Chucky Mullins (injured) |
| DB | | Don Price |
| DL | | Kelvin Pritchett |
| DB | | Todd Sandorini |
| LB | | Keith Thompson |
| DB | | Greg Vaughn |
| DL | | Dan Wigley |

Special teams

| Pos. | # | Name | Class |
|---|---|---|---|
| P | | Charles Childers |
| K | | Greg Hogue |
| K | | Brian Lee |

Head coach

- Billy Brewer

Coordinators/assistant coaches

Legend

- (C) Team captain
- (S) Suspended
- (I) Ineligible
- Injured
- Redshirt
