= 1989 Liberty Bowl =

- 31st Liberty Bowl
| Ole Miss Rebels | Air Force Falcons |
| (7–4) | (8–3–1) |
| SEC | WAC |
| 42 | 29 |
| Head coach: Billy Brewer | Head coach: Fisher DeBerry |
| | 1 | 2 | 3 | 4 | Total |
|---|---|---|---|---|---|
| Ole Miss | 14 | 14 | 7 | 7 | 42 |
| Air Force | 9 | 0 | 6 | 14 | 29 |
- Date: December 28, 1989
- Season: 1989
- Stadium: Liberty Bowl Memorial Stadium
- Location: Memphis, Tennessee
- MVP: Randy Baldwin (RB, Ole Miss)
- Attendance: 60,128

United States TV coverage
- Network: Raycom
- Announcers: Dave Barnett and Dave Rowe

The 1989 Liberty Bowl was a college football postseason bowl game played on December 28, 1989, in Memphis, Tennessee. The 31st edition of the Liberty Bowl was contested between the Ole Miss Rebels and the Air Force Falcons.

== Background ==
The Rebels finished tied for 4th position in the Southeastern Conference while the Falcons finished 2nd in the Western Athletic Conference. This was the first year in which the winner of the Commander in Chief's Trophy received an automatic bid to the Liberty Bowl. The two teams had matched up before in 1983. Chucky Mullins (who had been paralyzed in a game just two months ago) visited the Ole Miss locker room prior to the game in his first visit outside the hospital prior to his injury.

== Game summary ==
=== First quarter ===
- Ole Miss – Hines 32 pass from Darnell (Hogue PAT), 3:53 remaining
- Air Force – Wood 37 FG, 11:16 remaining
- Ole Miss – Baldwin 23 run (Hogue PAT), 9:18 remaining
- Air Force – Dowis 2 run (pass failed), 3:19 remaining

=== Second quarter ===
- Ole Miss – Baldwin 21 run (Hogue PAT), 10:20 remaining
- Ole Miss – Coleman 58 punt return (Hogue kick), 1:21 remaining

=== Third quarter ===
- Air Force – Johnson 3 run (run failed), 12:50 remaining
- Ole Miss – Coleman 11 run (Hogue PAT), 0:26 remaining

=== Fourth quarter ===
- Ole Miss – Thigpen 8 pass from Shows (Hogue PAT), 10:44 remaining
- Air Force – Senn 35 pass from McDowell (pass failed), 9:02 remaining
- Air Force – Senn 21 pass from McDowell (Durham run), 2:34 remaining

Randy Baldwin rushed for 177 yards on 14 carries with two touchdowns, and John Darnell passed for 19-of-33 for 261 yards and a touchdown.

== Aftermath ==
The two teams would meet up three years later in the Liberty Bowl again.

== Statistics ==
| Statistics | Ole Miss | Air Force |
|---|---|---|
| First downs | 30 | 25 |
| Rushing yards | 248 | 259 |
| Passing yards | 285 | 233 |
| Total yards | 533 | 513 |
| Passing C-A-I | 21–37–0 | 14–24–2 |
| Punts–average | 5–38.2 | 4–43.3 |
| Fumbles–lost | 2–2 | 3–2 |
| Penalties–yards | 7–45 | 2–12 |
