= 1990 Sugar Bowl =

1990 USF&G Sugar Bowl
- 56th Sugar Bowl
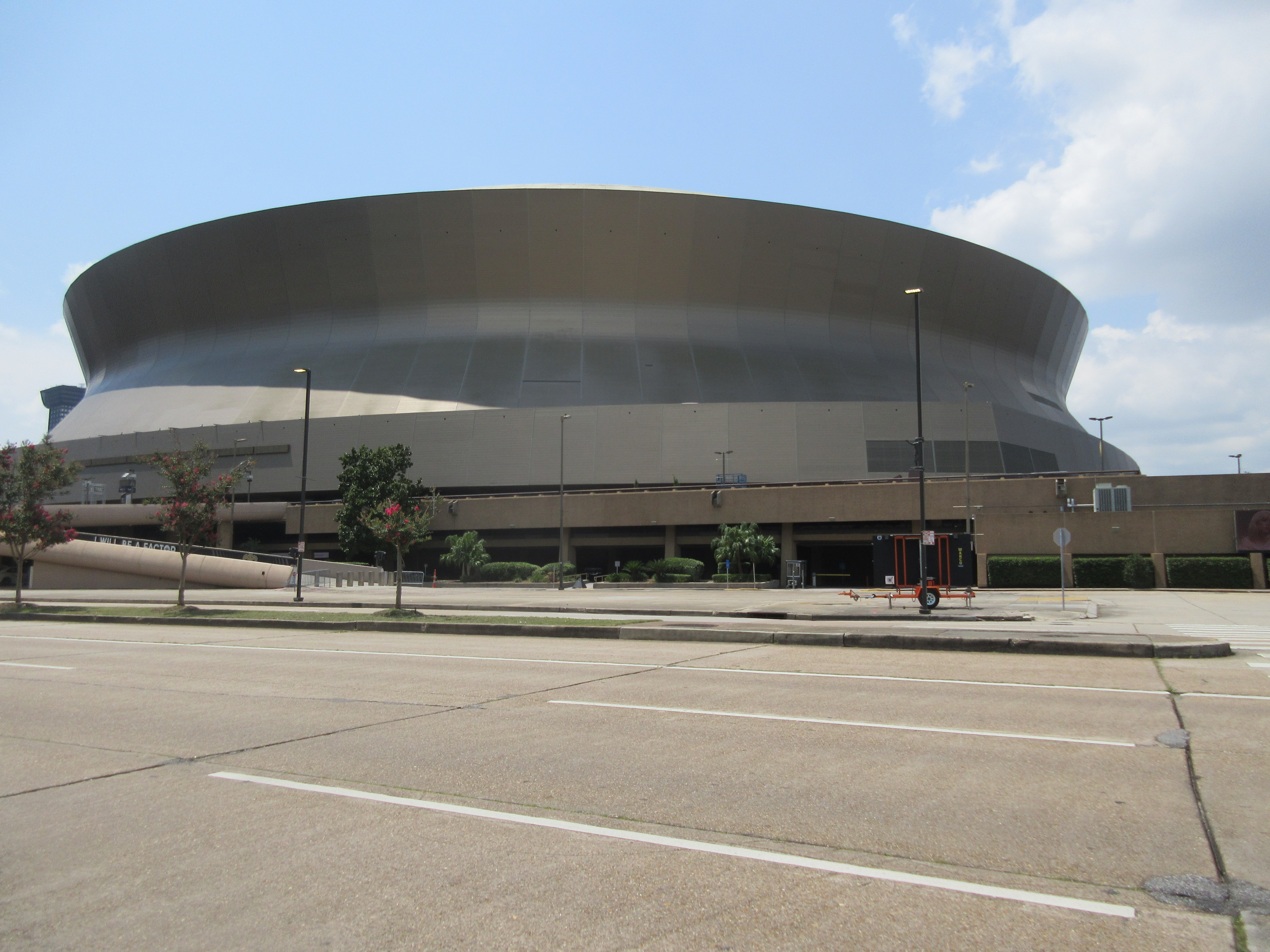
- The Louisiana Superdome in New Orleans, Louisiana, hosted the Sugar Bowl.
Miami Hurricanes	Alabama Crimson Tide
(10–1)	(10–1)
Independent	SEC
33	25
Head coach: Dennis Erickson	Head coach: Bill Curry
AP / Coaches; 2 / 2	AP / Coaches; 7 / 7
	1	2	3	4	Total
Miami	7	13	6	7	33
Alabama	0	17	0	8	25
- Date: January 1, 1990
- Season: 1989
- Stadium: Louisiana Superdome
- Location: New Orleans, Louisiana
- MVP: Craig Erickson (Miami QB)
- Favorite: Miami by 9 points
- Referee: John Nealon (Big Ten)
- Halftime show: Million Dollar Band, Band of the Hour
- Attendance: 77,452

United States TV coverage
- Network: ABC
- Announcers: Al Michaels, Frank Gifford, and Dan Dierdorf

The 1990 Sugar Bowl was the 56th edition of the college football bowl game, played at the Louisiana Superdome in New Orleans, Louisiana, on Monday, January 1. Part of the 1989–90 bowl game season, it featured the second-ranked independent Miami Hurricanes and the #7 Alabama Crimson Tide of the Southeastern Conference (SEC). Favored Miami won 33–25.

Sponsored by the USF&G insurance company, the game was officially known as the USF&G Sugar Bowl.

== Teams ==
Both teams entered the game with just one loss.

=== Miami ===
The Hurricanes' only loss was at Florida State in late October. Following their victory over Notre Dame a month later, they accepted an invitation to play in the Sugar Bowl. This was Miami's sixteenth bowl game appearance and second Sugar Bowl.

=== Alabama ===
The Crimson Tide won their first ten games, but lost to Auburn in the first-ever Iron Bowl played at Jordan–Hare Stadium, and fell from second to seventh in the AP poll. This was Alabama's 42nd bowl game appearance, eleventh in the Sugar Bowl, but the first in ten years, when they defeated the Arkansas Razorbacks en route to the national championship.

== Game summary ==
The game kicked off shortly after 7:30 p.m. CST, following the Rose Bowl on ABC, and shortly after the start of the Orange Bowl on NBC, which matched top-ranked Colorado and #4 Notre Dame.

Miami opened the scoring with Stephen McGuire's three-yard touchdown run. In the second quarter, Alabama tied the game on a four-yard Gary Hollingsworth touchdown pass to Marco Battle. On the next drive the Hurricanes retook the lead after Craig Erickson threw an eighteen-yard touchdown strike to Wesley Carroll. After the Carlos Huerta extra point was blocked by Thomas Rayam Miami led 13–7. The Tide cut the lead to 13–10 midway through the quarter on a 45-yard Philip Doyle field goal. The teams then traded touchdowns to end the quarter with Miami scoring on a three-yard Alex Johnson run and the Crimson Tide scoring on a four-yard touchdown pass from Gary Hollingsworth to Lamonde Russell to make the halftime score 20–17.

In the third quarter, the Hurricanes extended their lead on an eleven-yard Erickson touchdown pass to Rob Chudzinski and after a second missed extra point the score was 26–17 entering the final period. In the fourth, Miami scored again on a twelve-yard Randy Bethal touchdown reception from Erickson and Alabama scored the final points of the game after Prince Wimbley had a nine-yard touchdown reception from Gary Hollingsworth to make the final score 33–25.

Scoring summary

Quarter	Time	Drive			Team	Scoring information	Score	
Quarter	Time	Plays	Yards	TOP	Team	Scoring information	Miami	Alabama
1	4:55	9	66		Miami	Stephen McGuire 3-yard touchdown run, Carlos Huerta kick good	7	0
2	14:07	9	36		Alabama	Marco Battle 4-yard touchdown reception from Gary Hollingsworth, Philip Doyle kick good	7	7
2	12:10	5	78		Miami	Wesley Carroll 18-yard touchdown reception from Craig Erickson, Carlos Huerta kick no good (blocked)	13	7
2	8:58	4	7		Alabama	45-yard field goal by Philip Doyle	13	10
2	5:08	9	62		Miami	Alex Johnson 3-yard touchdown run, Carlos Huerta kick good	20	10
2	00:40	11	80		Alabama	Lamonde Russell 4-yard touchdown reception from Gary Hollingsworth, Philip Doyle kick good	20	17
3	6:54	10	67		Miami	Rob Chudzinski 11-yard touchdown reception from Craig Erickson, Carlos Huerta kick no good	26	17
4	12:35	11	88		Miami	Randy Bethal 12-yard touchdown reception from Craig Erickson, Carlos Huerta kick good	33	17
4	2:53	6	33		Alabama	Prince Wimbley 9-yard touchdown reception from Gary Hollingsworth, 2-point pass good	33	25
"TOP" = time of possession. For other American football terms, see Glossary of American football.							33	25

== Statistics ==
Statistics	Miami	Alabama
First downs	24	17
Rushes–yards	50–227	29–38
Passing yards	250	214
Passes	17–27–1	27–43–1
Total offense	77–477	72–252
Return yards	13	34
Punts–average	5–31.4	8–38.3
Fumbles–lost	2–2	0–0
Turnovers	3	1
Penalties–yards	11–77	3–24
Time of possession	30:38	29:22

== Aftermath ==
With #1 Colorado's loss in the Orange Bowl, both the Associated Press and Coaches' Polls awarded the Hurricanes the national championship, ranking them first in their final rankings. Alabama fell to ninth in the final AP poll.
