= 1989 Mississippi State Bulldogs football team =

American college football season

1989 Mississippi State Bulldogs football
- Conference: Southeastern Conference
- Record: 5–6 (1–6 SEC)
- Head coach: Rockey Felker (4th season)
- Offensive coordinator: Keith Daniels (1st season)
- Defensive coordinator: Jim Carmody (1st season)
- Home stadium: Scott Field

1989 Southeastern Conference football standings
	Conf.					Overall
Team	W		L		T	W		L		T
No. 5 Tennessee +	6	–	1	–	0	11	–	1	–	0
No. 9 Alabama +	6	–	1	–	0	10	–	2	–	0
No. 6 Auburn +	6	–	1	–	0	10	–	2	–	0
Florida	4	–	3	–	0	7	–	5	–	0
Ole Miss	4	–	3	–	0	8	–	4	–	0
Georgia	4	–	3	–	0	6	–	6	–	0
Kentucky	2	–	5	–	0	6	–	5	–	0
LSU	2	–	5	–	0	4	–	7	–	0
Mississippi State	1	–	6	–	0	5	–	6	–	0
Vanderbilt	0	–	7	–	0	1	–	10	–	0
+ – Conference co-champions; Rankings from AP Poll

The 1989 Mississippi State Bulldogs football team represented Mississippi State University as member of the Southeastern Conference (SEC) during the 1989 NCAA Division I-A football season. Led by fourth-year head coach Rockey Felker, the Bulldogs compiled a record of 5–6, with a mark of 1–6 in conference play, and finished ninth in the SEC.

== Schedule ==
Date	Opponent	Rank	Site	Result	Attendance	Source
September 2	Vanderbilt		Scott Field; Starkville, MS	W 42–7	31,678	
September 9	at No. 18 Southern Miss*		M. M. Roberts Stadium; Hattiesburg, MS	W 26–23	34,189	
September 23	at Georgia	No. 25	Sanford Stadium; Athens, GA	L 6–23	82,122	
September 30	vs. Florida		Tampa Stadium; Tampa, FL	L 0–21	68,109	
October 7	Northeast Louisiana*		Scott Field; Starkville, MS	W 28–14	25,105	
October 21	Memphis State*^{†}		Scott Field; Starkville, MS	W 35–10	37,192	
October 28	at No. 16 Auburn		Jordan-Hare Stadium; Auburn, AL	L 0–14	84,105	
November 4	at No. 5 Alabama		Legion Field; Birmingham, AL (rivalry)	L 10–23	75,962	
November 11	Tulane*		Scott Field; Starkville, MS	W 27–7	25,106	
November 18	at LSU		Tiger Stadium; Baton Rouge, LA (rivalry)	L 20–44	62,592	
November 25	vs. Ole Miss		Mississippi Veterans Memorial Stadium; Jackson, MS (Egg Bowl)	L 11–21	43,218	
*Non-conference game; ^{†}Homecoming; Rankings from AP Poll released prior to the game
