= 1989 Kentucky Wildcats football team =

American college football season

1989 Kentucky Wildcats football
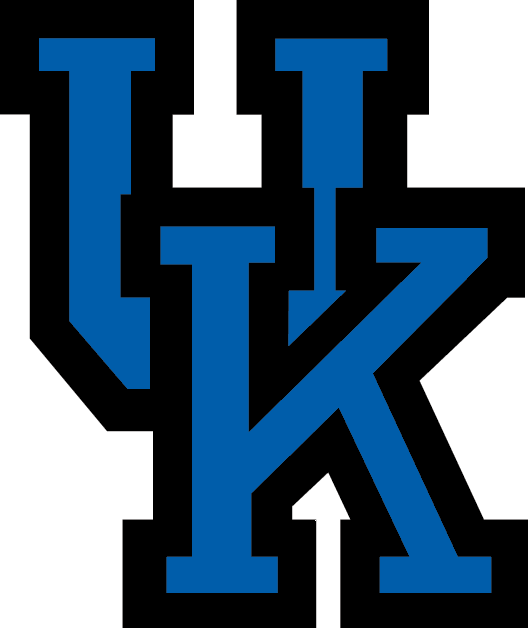
- Conference: Southeastern Conference
- Record: 6–5 (2–5 SEC)
- Head coach: Jerry Claiborne (8th season)
- Home stadium: Commonwealth Stadium

1989 Southeastern Conference football standings
	Conf.					Overall
Team	W		L		T	W		L		T
No. 5 Tennessee +	6	–	1	–	0	11	–	1	–	0
No. 9 Alabama +	6	–	1	–	0	10	–	2	–	0
No. 6 Auburn +	6	–	1	–	0	10	–	2	–	0
Florida	4	–	3	–	0	7	–	5	–	0
Ole Miss	4	–	3	–	0	8	–	4	–	0
Georgia	4	–	3	–	0	6	–	6	–	0
Kentucky	2	–	5	–	0	6	–	5	–	0
LSU	2	–	5	–	0	4	–	7	–	0
Mississippi State	1	–	6	–	0	5	–	6	–	0
Vanderbilt	0	–	7	–	0	1	–	10	–	0
+ – Conference co-champions; Rankings from AP Poll

The 1989 Kentucky Wildcats football team represented the University of Kentucky as a Southeastern Conference (SEC) member during the 1989 NCAA Division I-A football season. Led by eighth-year head coach Jerry Claiborne, the Wildcats compiled an overall record of 6–5, with a mark of 2–5 in conference play, and finished tied for seventh in the SEC. The Wildcats scored 212 points and allowed 220 points.

Kentucky opened with wins against Indiana and North Carolina, lost to Alabama and Auburn, beat Rutgers and LSU, lost at Georgia, beat Cincinnati and Vanderbilt, and lost to Florida and Tennessee.

== Schedule ==
Date	Opponent	Site	Result	Attendance	Source
September 9	Indiana*	Commonwealth Stadium; Lexington, KY (rivalry)	W 17–14	58,216	
September 16	North Carolina*	Commonwealth Stadium; Lexington, KY	W 13–6	50,174	
September 23	at No. 15 Alabama	Bryant–Denny Stadium; Tuscaloosa, AL	L 3–15	70,123	
October 7	No. 11 Auburn	Commonwealth Stadium; Lexington, KY	L 12–24	55,688	
October 14	Rutgers*	Commonwealth Stadium; Lexington, KY	W 33–26	54,771	
October 21	LSU	Commonwealth Stadium; Lexington, KY	W 27–21	53,967	
October 28	at Georgia	Sanford Stadium; Athens, GA	L 23–34	81,987	
November 4	Cincinnati*	Commonwealth Stadium; Lexington, KY	W 31–0	46,195	
November 11	at Vanderbilt	Vanderbilt Stadium; Nashville, TN (rivalry)	W 15–11	39,876	
November 18	at Florida	Ben Hill Griffin Stadium; Gainesville, FL (rivalry)	L 28–38	71,432	
November 25	No. 11 Tennessee	Commonwealth Stadium; Lexington, KY (rivalry)	L 10–31	55,237	
*Non-conference game; Rankings from AP Poll released prior to the game

== Roster ==
1989 Kentucky Wildcats football team roster
Players
Coaches
Offense

Pos.	#	Name	Class
[[American football positions|]]
[[American football positions|]]

Defense

Pos.	#	Name	Class
[[American football positions|]]

Special teams

Pos.	#	Name	Class

}}

Head coach

- [[]]

Coordinators/assistant coaches

Legend

- (C) Team captain
- (S) Suspended
- (I) Ineligible
- Injured
- Redshirt

== Team players in the 1990 NFL draft ==
Player	Position	Round	Pick	NFL club
Oliver Barnett	Defensive end	3	55	Atlanta Falcons
Donnie Gardner	Defensive end	7	171	Tampa Bay Buccaneers
Andy Murray	Running back	7	185	Houston Oilers
