= 1989 LSU Tigers football team =

American college football season

1989 LSU Tigers football
- Conference: Southeastern Conference
- Record: 4–7 (2–5 SEC)
- Head coach: Mike Archer (3rd season)
- Offensive coordinator: Ed Zaunbrecher (5th season)
- Defensive coordinator: Pete Jenkins (4th season)
- Home stadium: Tiger Stadium

1989 Southeastern Conference football standings
	Conf.					Overall
Team	W		L		T	W		L		T
No. 5 Tennessee +	6	–	1	–	0	11	–	1	–	0
No. 9 Alabama +	6	–	1	–	0	10	–	2	–	0
No. 6 Auburn +	6	–	1	–	0	10	–	2	–	0
Florida	4	–	3	–	0	7	–	5	–	0
Ole Miss	4	–	3	–	0	8	–	4	–	0
Georgia	4	–	3	–	0	6	–	6	–	0
Kentucky	2	–	5	–	0	6	–	5	–	0
LSU	2	–	5	–	0	4	–	7	–	0
Mississippi State	1	–	6	–	0	5	–	6	–	0
Vanderbilt	0	–	7	–	0	1	–	10	–	0
+ – Conference co-champions; Rankings from AP Poll

The 1989 LSU Tigers football team represented Louisiana State University during the 1989 NCAA Division I-A football season. The team was led by Mike Archer in his third season and finished with an overall record of four wins and seven losses (4–7 overall, 2–5 in the SEC).

== Schedule ==
Date	Time	Opponent	Rank	Site	TV	Result	Attendance	Source
September 2	5:45 p.m.	at Texas A&M*	No. 7	Kyle Field; College Station, TX (rivalry)	ESPN	L 16–28	61,733	
September 16	6:30 p.m.	Florida State*	No. 21	Tiger Stadium; Baton Rouge, LA	ESPN	L 21–31	75,524	
September 30	7:00 p.m.	Ohio*		Tiger Stadium; Baton Rouge, LA	PPV	W 57–6	63,860	
October 7	7:00 p.m.	Florida		Tiger Stadium; Baton Rouge, LA (rivalry)	PPV	L 13–16	74,527	
October 14	1:45 p.m.	at No. 12 Auburn		Jordan-Hare Stadium; Auburn, AL (rivalry)	CBS	L 6–10	85,214	
October 21	5:30 p.m.	at Kentucky		Commonwealth Stadium; Lexington, KY	PPV	L 21–27	53,967	
October 28	12:00 p.m.	No. 11 Tennessee^{†}		Tiger Stadium; Baton Rouge, LA	TBS	L 39–45	71,634	
November 4	1:30 p.m.	at Ole Miss		Vaught–Hemingway Stadium; Oxford, MS (rivalry)	PPV	W 35–30	42,354	
November 11	6:30 p.m.	No. 4 Alabama		Tiger Stadium; Baton Rouge, LA (rivalry)	ESPN	L 16–32	77,197	
November 18	7:00 p.m.	Mississippi State		Tiger Stadium; Baton Rouge, LA (rivalry)	PPV	W 44–20	62,592	
November 25	7:00 p.m.	at Tulane*		Louisiana Superdome; New Orleans, LA (Battle for the Rag)	PPV	W 27–7	41,573	
*Non-conference game; ^{†}Homecoming; Rankings from AP Poll released prior to the game; All times are in Central time

== Roster ==
1989 LSU Tigers football team roster
Players
Coaches
Offense

Pos.	#	Name	Class
WR	9	Wesley Jacob	Fr
QB	13	Tommy Hodson	Sr
SE	49	Todd Kinchen	So
TB	22	Harvey Williams	Jr
C	52	Kevin Mawae	Fr

Defense

Pos.	#	Name	Class
SS	19	Corey Raymond	So
DE	77	Kenny Davidson	Sr
NG	96	Bo Davis	Fr

Special teams

Pos.	#	Name	Class

Head coach

- Mike Archer

Coordinators/assistant coaches

- Ed Zaunbrecher – Offensive coordinator/quarterbacks
- Jesse Daigle – Running backs
- Jerry Sullivan – Wide receivers
- Kenny Ferraro – Offensive line
- John Hendrick – Offensive line/tight ends
- Pete Jenkins – Defensive coordinator/defensive line
- John Fontes – Inside linebackers
- John Mitchell – Outside linebackers
- Joe Wessel – Special teams coordinator/defensive backs

Legend

- (C) Team captain
- (S) Suspended
- (I) Ineligible
- Injured
- Redshirt

Roster
