= 1989 Florida Gators football team =

American college football season

1989 Florida Gators football

Freedom Bowl, L 7–34 v. Washington
- Conference: Southeastern Conference
- Record: 7–5 (4–3 SEC)
- Head coach: Galen Hall (6th season season; first 5 games); Gary Darnell (interim; final 7 games)
- Offensive coordinator: Whitey Jordan (1st season)
- Defensive coordinator: Gary Darnell (2nd season)
- Home stadium: Ben Hill Griffin Stadium

1989 Southeastern Conference football standings
	Conf.					Overall
Team	W		L		T	W		L		T
No. 5 Tennessee +	6	–	1	–	0	11	–	1	–	0
No. 9 Alabama +	6	–	1	–	0	10	–	2	–	0
No. 6 Auburn +	6	–	1	–	0	10	–	2	–	0
Florida	4	–	3	–	0	7	–	5	–	0
Ole Miss	4	–	3	–	0	8	–	4	–	0
Georgia	4	–	3	–	0	6	–	6	–	0
Kentucky	2	–	5	–	0	6	–	5	–	0
LSU	2	–	5	–	0	4	–	7	–	0
Mississippi State	1	–	6	–	0	5	–	6	–	0
Vanderbilt	0	–	7	–	0	1	–	10	–	0
+ – Conference co-champions; Rankings from AP Poll

The 1989 Florida Gators football team represented the University of Florida during the 1989 NCAA Division I-A football season. The season was Galen Hall's sixth and final season as the head coach of the Florida Gators football team; Hall was replaced as the Gators head coach after five games by his defensive coordinator, Gary Darnell. Hall and Darnell's 1989 Florida Gators posted an overall record of 7–5 and a Southeastern Conference (SEC) record of 4–3, tying for fourth place in the ten-team SEC.

== Schedule ==
Date	Time	Opponent	Rank	Site	TV	Result	Attendance	Source
September 9	12:30 pm	Ole Miss		Ben Hill Griffin Stadium; Gainesville, FL	TBS	L 19–24	70,014	
September 16		Louisiana Tech*		Ben Hill Griffin Stadium; Gainesville, FL		W 34–7	65,109	
September 23		at Memphis State*		Liberty Bowl Memorial Stadium; Memphis, TN		W 38–13	25,163	
September 30		vs. Mississippi State		Tampa Stadium; Tampa, FL		W 21–0	68,109	
October 7	8:00 pm	at LSU		Tiger Stadium; Baton Rouge, LA (rivalry)	PPV	W 16–13	74,527	
October 14		Vanderbilt	No. 25	Ben Hill Griffin Stadium; Gainesville, FL		W 34–11	69,121	
October 21		New Mexico*^{†}	No. 20	Ben Hill Griffin Stadium; Gainesville, FL		W 27–21	72,578	
November 4		at No. 12 Auburn	No. 19	Jordan-Hare Stadium; Auburn, AL (rivalry)	ESPN	L 7–10	85,214	
November 11	12:30 pm	vs. Georgia	No. 20	Gator Bowl Stadium; Jacksonville, FL (rivalry)	TBS	L 10–17	81,577	
November 18		Kentucky		Ben Hill Griffin Stadium; Gainesville, FL (rivalry)		W 38–28	71,432	
December 2	7:30 pm	No. 6 Florida State*		Ben Hill Griffin Stadium; Gainesville, FL (rivalry)	ESPN	L 17–24	75,124	
December 30	2:00 pm	vs. Washington*		Anaheim Stadium; Anaheim, CA (Freedom Bowl)	NBC	L 7–34	33,858	
*Non-conference game; ^{†}Homecoming; Rankings from AP Poll released prior to the game; All times are in Eastern time

== Personnel ==
1989 Florida Gators football team roster
Players
Coaches
Offense

Pos.	#	Name	Class
WR	3	Terence Barber	Jr
OL	52	Chris Bromley	Jr
OL		Brian Fisher	Fr
OL	59	Cal Dixon	So
QB		Donald Douglas	Fr
OL	72	John Durden	Sr
OL	76	Brad Hatcher	Sr
OL		Hesham Ismail	So
WR	8	Tony Jones	Sr
TE		Greg Keller
TE	88	Kirk Kirkpatrick	Jr
WR	20	Tony Lomack	Sr
RB	5	Willie McClendon	So
RB	21	Dexter McNabb	So
WR	14	Ernie Mills	Jr
QB	1	Kyle Morris	So
RB	34	Darryl Perry	Sr
RB		Errict Rhett
WR	25	Stacey Simmons	Sr
RB	39	Cedric Smith	Sr
RB	22	Emmitt Smith	Jr
QB	12	Lex Smith	Fr
OL		Richard Starowesky
WR		Alonzo Sullivan
TE		Harvey Thomas

Defense

Pos.	#	Name	Class
DB	44	Ephesians Bartley	So
DL	94	Mike Brandon	So
DL	50	Brad Culpepper	So
DB	28	Richard Fain	Jr
LB		Monty Grow	Fr
DL	71	Tony McCoy	Jr
LB	45	Pat Moorer	Sr
DL		Mark Murray
DB	98	Godfrey Myles	Jr
DL		Glenn Neely
LB	57	Jerry Odom	Jr
LB	99	Tim Paulk	So
LB	90	Huey Richardson	Jr
DB		Del Speer	Fr
DB	6	Jimmy Spencer	Jr
DB		Kerry Watkins
DB		Will White	Fr

Special teams

Pos.	#	Name	Class
K		John David Francis

Head coach

- Galen Hall

Coordinators/assistant coaches

- Gary Darnell (DC)
- Whitey Jordan (OC)
- Charlie Strong (OLB)

Legend

- (C) Team captain
- (S) Suspended
- (I) Ineligible
- Injured
- Redshirt

== Game summaries ==
=== Ole Miss ===
Ole Miss Rebels (1–0) at Florida Gators (0–0)

Quarter	1	2	3	4	Total
Ole Miss	7	0	14	3	24
Florida	3	3	0	13	19

at Florida Field, Gainesville, Florida

- Date: September 9, 1989
- Game attendance: 70,014
- Gainesville Sun, 1989 Sep 10.

Game information

First quarter

- FLA – John David Francis 36-yard field goal. Florida 3–0. Drive:
- MISS – Randy Baldwin 9-yard pass from John Darnell (Greg Hogue kick). Ole Miss 7–3. Drive:

Second quarter

- FLA – John David Francis 34-yard field goal. Ole Miss 7–6. Drive:

Third quarter

- MISS – Randy Baldwin 1-yard run (Greg Hogue kick). Ole Miss 14–6. Drive:
- MISS – Chauncey Godwin 58-yard interception return (Greg Hogue kick). Ole Miss 21–6.

Fourth quarter

- FLA – Emmitt Smith 5-yard run (pass failed). Ole Miss 21–12. Drive:
- MISS – Brian Lee 40-yard field goal. Ole Miss 24–12. Drive:
- FLA – Emmitt Smith 2-yard run (John David Francis kick). Ole Miss 24–19. Drive:

Top passers

- MISS – John Darnell – 6/14, 48 yards, TD, INT
- FLA – Kyle Morris – 18/35, 216 yards, 2 INT

Top rushers

- MISS – Randy Baldwin – 13 rushes, 35 yards, TD
- FLA – Emmitt Smith – 29 rushes, 117 yards, 2 TD

Top receivers

- MISS – Reid Hines – 2 receptions, 26 yards
- FLA – Kirk Kirkpatrick – 6 receptions, 83 yards

=== Louisiana Tech ===
	1	2	3	4	Total
Louisiana Tech	0	7	0	0	7
Florida	10	0	21	3	34

=== At Memphis State ===
	1	2	3	4	Total
Florida	10	14	7	7	38
Memphis State	7	3	3	0	13

=== Mississippi State ===
	1	2	3	4	Total
Mississippi State	0	0	0	0	0
Florida	0	14	0	7	21

at Tampa, Florida

=== At LSU ===
	1	2	3	4	Total
Florida	3	0	3	10	16
LSU	0	10	0	3	13

=== Vanderbilt ===
	1	2	3	4	Total
Vanderbilt	0	3	0	8	11
Florida	10	17	7	0	34

=== New Mexico ===
	1	2	3	4	Total
New Mexico	0	0	7	14	21
Florida	7	7	10	3	27

=== At Auburn ===
#19 Florida Gators (6–1) at #12 Auburn Tigers (5–2)

Quarter	1	2	3	4	Total
Florida	7	0	0	0	7
Auburn	0	0	3	7	10

at Jordan–Hare Stadium, Auburn, Alabama

- Date: November 4
- Game attendance: 85,214
- TV: ESPN

Game information

First quarter

- FLA – Emmitt Smith 5-yard run (John David Francis kick), 4:09. Florida 7–0.

Second quarter

- No scoring

Third quarter

- AUB – Win Lyle 47-yard field goal, 2:18. Florida 7–3.

Fourth quarter

- AUB – Shayne Wasden 25-yard pass from Reggie Slack (Win Lyle kick), 0:26. Auburn 10–7.

Top passers

- FLA – Donald Douglas – 1/5, 6 yards
- AUB – Reggie Slack – 12/19, 143 yards, TD

Top rushers

- FLA – Emmitt Smith – 27 rushes, 86 yards, TD
- AUB – James Joseph – 26 rushes, 55 yards

Top receivers

- FLA – Kirk Kirkpatrick – 1 reception, 6 yards
- AUB – James Joseph – 3 receptions, 47 yards

=== Vs. Georgia ===
	1	2	3	4	Total
Florida	0	7	0	3	10
Georgia	0	3	14	0	17

at Jacksonville, Florida

=== Kentucky ===
	1	2	3	4	Total
Kentucky	7	0	7	14	28
Florida	10	14	7	7	38

=== Florida State ===
	1	2	3	4	Total
Florida State	7	3	7	7	24
Florida	3	7	0	7	17

=== Freedom Bowl (vs. Washington) ===
	1	2	3	4	Total
Florida	7	0	0	0	7
Washington	17	10	0	7	34

at Anaheim, California
