= 1990 Cotton Bowl Classic =

1990 Mobil Cotton Bowl Classic
- 54th Cotton Bowl Classic
- The Cotton Bowl in Dallas, Texas, hosted the Cotton Bowl Classic.
Tennessee Volunteers	Arkansas Razorbacks
(10–1)	(10–1)
SEC	SWC
31	27
Head coach: Johnny Majors	Head coach: Ken Hatfield
AP / Coaches; 8 / 8	AP / Coaches; 10 / 9
	1	2	3	4	Total
Tennessee	3	14	14	0	31
Arkansas	6	0	7	14	27
- Date: January 1, 1990
- Season: 1989
- Stadium: Cotton Bowl
- Location: Dallas, Texas
- MVP: FS Carl Pickens (Tennessee); TB Chuck Webb (Tennessee)
- Referee: Sam Maphis (Big Eight)
- Attendance: 74,358

United States TV coverage
- Network: CBS
- Announcers: Jim Nantz and Pat Haden

The 1990 Cotton Bowl Classic featured the Tennessee Volunteers and the Arkansas Razorbacks.

== Background ==
The Razorbacks won their 2nd consecutive Southwest Conference championship, attended their 6th consecutive bowl appearance and second consecutive Cotton Bowl Classic. A loss to Texas midway through the season made them fall from #7 to #18, but they bounced back to finish #10 at the end of the season. The Volunteers were co champions of the Southeastern Conference with Auburn and Alabama (who gave the Vols their only loss) after a 5-6 campaign the previous year. It was their first Cotton Bowl Classic since 1969.

== Game summary ==
Despite being outgained in yards and first downs, Tennessee edged out a win, aided by Chuck Webb's 250 yards of rushing on 26 attempts and Arkansas' three turnovers. It was a Greg Burke field goal that started off the scoring less than five minutes into the game. But Arkansas retaliated with a Barry Foster touchdown run four minutes later. Nine minutes into the second quarter, Carl Pickens intercepted a Quinn Grovey pass while the Razorbacks were in Vols territory, returning it to the 13. Two plays later, Anthony Morgan caught an 84 yard touchdown pass from Andy Kelly. Chuck Webb added in a touchdown run to make the lead 17-6 at halftime. Arkansas was driving and was at the Vols 32 when Barry Foster fumbled and Martin Williams recovered it. 8 plays and 68 yards later, Greg Amsler scored on a touchdown run to make the lead 24-6. Midway through the quarter the Razorbacks narrowed the lead with a James Rouse touchdown run. But Webb ran in for his second touchdown of the day to make the lead 18 again. 14 seconds into the fourth quarter, Foster scored on another touchdown run and scored a conversion to make it 31-21. Arkansas had three more drives in the quarter, but only managed seven points out of them, turning the ball over on downs on one, and missing a field goal on the other. The Razorbacks scored with 1:25 remaining on a Billy Winston pass from Grovey to narrow it to 31-27 after the missed conversion. Arkansas tried to get the ball back on the onside kick, but Alvin Harper of the Vols recovered, as they ran out the clock and won their first Cotton Bowl Classic since 1951.

== Aftermath ==
Hatfield left for Clemson after the season, and Arkansas has not won a conference championship since 1989. It would take Arkansas 10 years to reach another Cotton Bowl Classic. The Volunteers would not reach the Classic again until 2001.

== Statistics ==
Statistics	Tennessee	Arkansas
First downs	16	31
Yards Rushing	320	361
Yards Passing	150	207
Total Yards	470	568
Punts-Average	5–39.0	3–44.3
Fumbles-Lost	0–0	3–2
Interceptions	2	1
Penalties-Yards	4–36	3–20
