= 1989 Vanderbilt Commodores football team =

American college football season

1989 Vanderbilt Commodores football
- Conference: Southeastern Conference
- Record: 1–10 (0–7 SEC)
- Head coach: Watson Brown (4th season)
- Offensive coordinator: Bill Schmitz (1st as OC, 4th overall season)
- Defensive coordinator: Rick Christophel (1st as DC, 4th overall season)
- Home stadium: Vanderbilt Stadium

1989 Southeastern Conference football standings
	Conf.					Overall
Team	W		L		T	W		L		T
No. 5 Tennessee +	6	–	1	–	0	11	–	1	–	0
No. 9 Alabama +	6	–	1	–	0	10	–	2	–	0
No. 6 Auburn +	6	–	1	–	0	10	–	2	–	0
Florida	4	–	3	–	0	7	–	5	–	0
Ole Miss	4	–	3	–	0	8	–	4	–	0
Georgia	4	–	3	–	0	6	–	6	–	0
Kentucky	2	–	5	–	0	6	–	5	–	0
LSU	2	–	5	–	0	4	–	7	–	0
Mississippi State	1	–	6	–	0	5	–	6	–	0
Vanderbilt	0	–	7	–	0	1	–	10	–	0
+ – Conference co-champions; Rankings from AP Poll

The 1989 Vanderbilt Commodores football team represented Vanderbilt University in the 1989 NCAA Division I-A football season as a member of the Southeastern Conference (SEC). The Commodores were led by head coach Watson Brown in his fourth season and finished with a record of one win and ten losses (1–10 overall, 0–7 in the SEC).

== Schedule ==
Date	Opponent	Site	Result	Attendance	Source
September 2	at Mississippi State	Scott Field; Starkville, MS	L 7–42	31,678	
September 23	Ohio*	Vanderbilt Stadium; Nashville, TN	W 54–10	38,672	
September 30	No. 13 Alabama	Vanderbilt Stadium; Nashville, TN	L 14–20	29,106	
October 7	at Memphis State*	Liberty Bowl Memorial Stadium; Memphis, TN	L 10–13	26,345	
October 14	at No. 25 Florida	Ben Hill Griffin Stadium; Gainesville, FL	L 11–34	69,121	
October 21	Georgia	Vanderbilt Stadium; Nashville, TN (rivalry)	L 16–35	40,691	
October 28	at Ole Miss	Vaught–Hemingway Stadium; Oxford, MS (rivalry)	L 16–24	34,500	
November 4	at Virginia Tech*	Lane Stadium; Blacksburg, VA	L 0–18	23,752	
November 11	Kentucky	Vanderbilt Stadium; Nashville, TN (rivalry)	L 11–15	39,876	
November 18	Tulane*	Vanderbilt Stadium; Nashville, TN	L 13–37	30,174	
December 2	at No. 8 Tennessee	Neyland Stadium; Knoxville, TN (rivalry)	L 10–17	92,975	
*Non-conference game; Rankings from AP Poll released prior to the game
