= 1989 Peach Bowl =

American college football game

- 22nd Peach Bowl
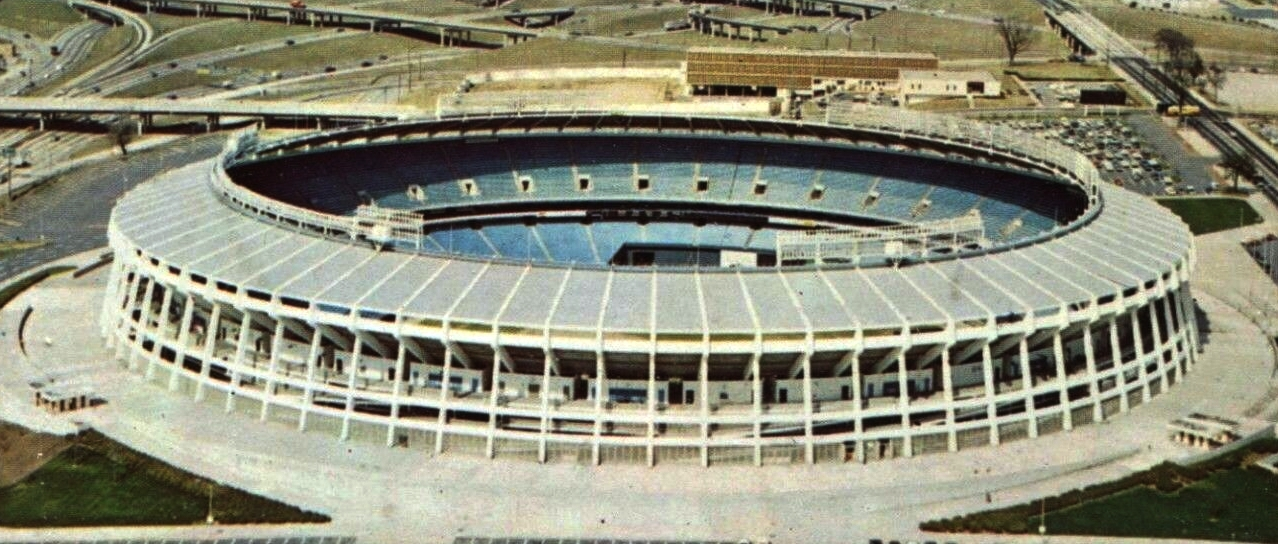
- The Atlanta–Fulton County Stadium in Atlanta, Georgia, hosted the Peach Bowl.
Syracuse Orangemen	Georgia Bulldogs
(7–4)	(6–5)
Independent	SEC
19	18
Head coach: Dick MacPherson	Head coach: Ray Goff
	1	2	3	4	Total
Syracuse	7	0	3	9	19
Georgia	7	3	8	0	18
- Date: December 30, 1989
- Season: 1989
- Stadium: Atlanta–Fulton County Stadium
- Location: Atlanta, Georgia
- MVP: RB Michael Owens (Syracuse); LB Terry Wooden (Syracuse); RB Rodney Hampton (Georgia); LB Mo Lewis (Georgia)
- Referee: Donald Safrit (ACC)
- Attendance: 44,911

United States TV coverage
- Network: ABC
- Announcers: Gary Bender & Dick Vermeil

The 1989 Peach Bowl took place on December 30, 1989. The competing teams were Syracuse and Georgia.

== Background ==
Syracuse was in a bowl game for the 3rd straight year, which was also their first Peach Bowl ever. Georgia had a streak of winning and losing through the season, winning the first two games, losing the next three, winning four straight, and then losing two straight games to the end the season tied with Florida and Ole Miss while Alabama, Tennessee & Auburn (the latter two having beat Georgia) all shared the Southeastern Conference title, in Goff's first year at the program. This was Georgia's 10th straight bowl appearance, along with their first Peach Bowl since 1973.

== Game summary ==
- Georgia – Warner 5-yard touchdown pass from Talley (Kasay kick), 10:34 remaining in the 1st quarter
- Syracuse – Owens 1-yard touchdown run (Biskup kick), 6:07 remaining in the 1st quarter
- Georgia – Kasay 20-yard field goal, 12:53 remaining in the 2nd quarter
- Georgia – Safety on ball centered through endzone, 9:52 remaining in the 3rd quarter
- Georgia – Hampton 4-yard touchdown pass from Talley (pass failed), 7:39 remaining in the 3rd quarter
- Syracuse – Biskup 32-yard field goal, 1:44 remaining in the 3rd quarter
- Syracuse – Moore 19-yard touchdown pass from McDonald (pass failed), 10:08 remaining in the 4th quarter
- Syracuse – Biskup 26-yard field goal, 1:08 remaining in the 4th quarter

Owens rushed for 112 yards on 14 carries for Syracuse. For Georgia, Hampton rushed for 32 yards on 14 carries. Mo Lewis returned an interception 77 yards, a Peach Bowl record.

== Statistics ==
Statistics	Syracuse	Georgia
First downs	27	12
Rushing yards	245	113
Passing yards	224	88
Passes (comp–att–int)	22–24–3	10–19–1
Return yardage	31	140
Fumbles–lost	3–1	1–0
Punts–average	3 (41.0)	7 (41.0)
Penalties–yards	2–10	3–30

== Aftermath ==
Syracuse would go to three straight bowl games, and go to five more in the next decade. Georgia went through a patch in which they went to three bowl games in Goff's six remaining years. Georgia returned to the Peach Bowl in 1995, in the final game for Goff before he was fired. Syracuse hasn't returned to the Peach Bowl since this game.
