= Chucky Mullins =

American college football player (1969–1991)

- Mullins with Ole Miss

No. 38
- Position: Cornerback

Personal information
- Born: July 8, 1969; Russellville, Alabama, U.S.
- Died: May 6, 1991 (aged 21); Memphis, Tennessee, U.S.
- Listed height: 6 ft 0 in (1.83 m)
- Listed weight: 170 lb (77 kg)

Career information
- High school: Russellville
- College: Ole Miss (1988–1989)

Awards and highlights
- Ole Miss Rebels No. 38 retired

Roy Lee "Chucky" Mullins (July 8, 1969 – May 6, 1991) was an American college football cornerback who played for the Ole Miss Rebels. His career was ended by a football injury that left him a quadriplegic.

== Accident and aftermath ==
Mullins was injured on October 28, 1989, during the Ole Miss Rebels homecoming game against the Vanderbilt Commodores. He plunged head-first into a tackle of Vanderbilt fullback Brad Gaines after a short pass attempt. The impact shattered four vertebrae in the cervical spine of Mullins, immediately paralyzing him.

After being airlifted to Baptist Memorial Hospital in Memphis, Tennessee, Mullins underwent a tracheotomy and five-hour bone graft operation to fuse the vertebrae. Mullins never regained sensation below his neck. After months of intensive physical therapy, however, he was eventually able to move a hand across his body and touch his chest.

Mullins became the recipient of donations of money towards his medical expenses. Ole Miss established the "Chucky Mullins Trust Fund" to properly manage the donations. The city of Oxford donated land for a specially designed, handicap-accessible house for Mullins. Donations to the trust fund eventually exceeded $1 million. President George H. W. Bush visited Mullins in his hospital room and encouraged him while on a visit to Memphis.

Mullins returned to Ole Miss on June 20, 1990, to complete his undergraduate studies.

== Death ==
Less than a year after returning to school, Mullins was stricken by a pulmonary embolism, which are blood clots formed by inactivity and poor circulation. He died in the hospital on May 6, 1991, and was buried in his home town of Russellville, Alabama.

== Memorials and honors ==
On September 26, 2014, Coliseum Drive on the Ole Miss campus was renamed as Chucky Mullins Drive.

During Mullins' time in the hospital, he and Brad Gaines, who did not know each other before the accident, became friends. Since the death of Mullins, Gaines visits and maintains his friend's gravesite three times a year: May 6 (the anniversary of the death of Mullins), October 28 (the anniversary of the injury) and December 25 (Christmas Day).

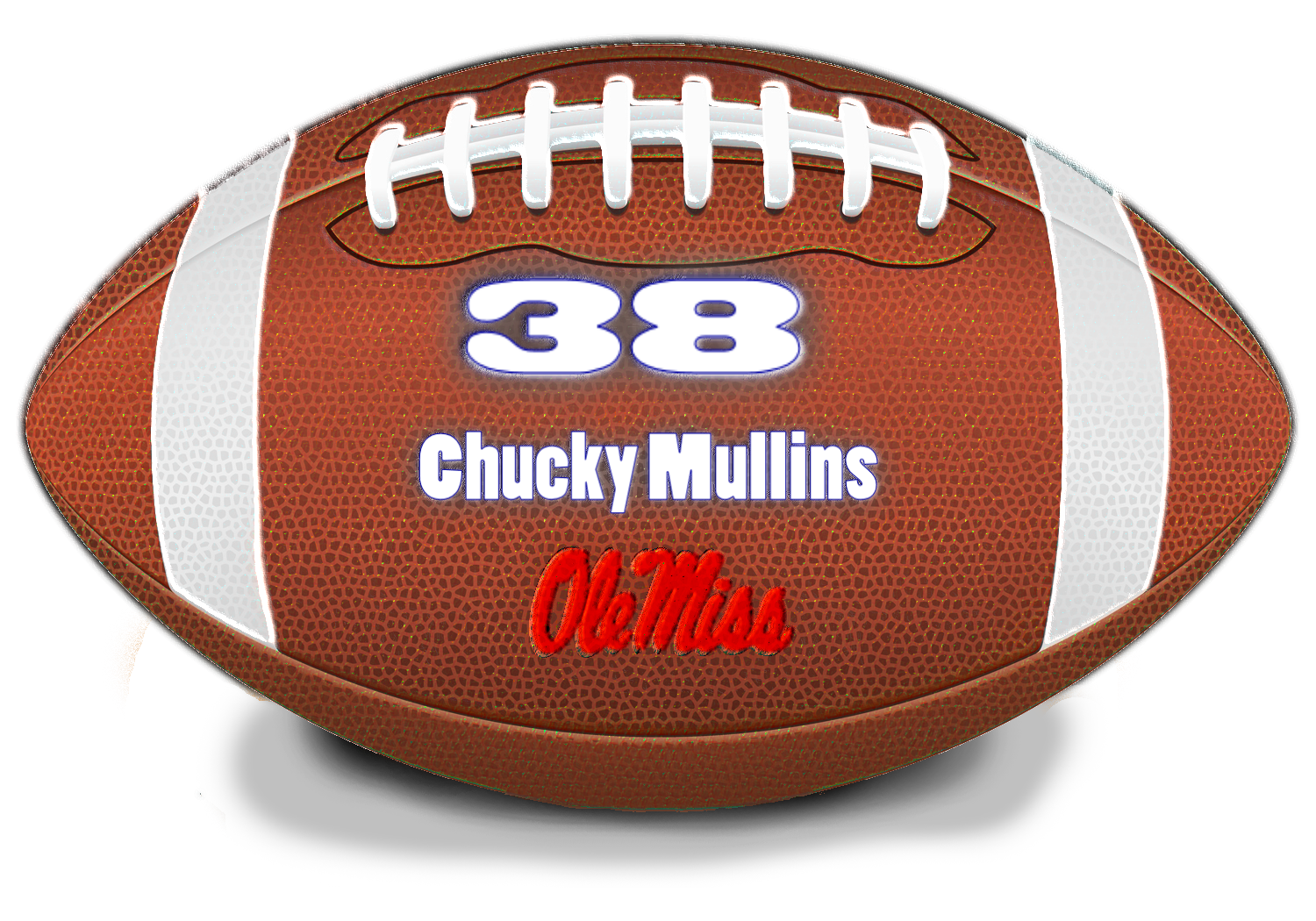
Mullins' #38 was retired by Vanderbilt in his honour

The impact of the accident on Gaines, and the injury to Mullins, is the subject of a SEC storied documentary "It's Time", which first aired in September 2014 on the SEC Network.

Each spring, during the annual Grove Bowl—a game at the end of spring practices pitting Ole Miss players against each other—the player who most embodies the spirit and courage of Mullins, receives the "Chucky Mullins Memorial Courage Award". With the award, the player received the right to wear jersey number 38, the same number Mullins wore. Chucky's number 38 was retired on September 3, 2006, in a pregame ceremony before the Rebels victory over the Memphis Tigers. From 2006 until 2009, the winner of the award wore a patch in honor of this award. However, the retiring of Chucky's jersey #38 proved to be an unpopular move. Thus, after changes to the award (i.e. any defensive player is eligible, no longer just a rising senior defensive player), the number was returned to circulation in 2010 to be worn by the award winner for that season. Beginning with the 2021 season, award recipients are given the option of wearing a jersey with #38 or retaining their original jersey number with a "38" patch on it.

== Winners of the Chucky Mullins Courage Award ==
- 1990 – Chris Mitchell
- 1991 – Jeff Carter
- 1992 – Trea Southerland
- 1993 – Johnny Dixon
- 1994 – Alundis Brice
- 1995 – Michael Lowery
- 1996 – Derek Jones
- 1997 – Nate Wayne
- 1998 – Gary Thigpen
- 1999 – Ronnie Heard
- 2000 – Anthony Magee
- 2001 – Kevin Thomas
- 2002 – Lanier Goethie
- 2003 – Jamil Northcutt
- 2004 – Eric Oliver
- 2005 – Kelvin Robinson
- 2006 – Patrick Willis
- 2007 – Jeremy Garrett
- 2008 – Jamarca Sanford
- 2009 – Marcus Tillman
- 2010 – Kentrell Lockett
- 2011 – D. T. Shackelford
- 2012 – Jason Jones
- 2013 – Mike Marry
- 2014 – Detarrian (D.T.) Shackleford (2nd award)
- 2015 – Mike Hilton
- 2016 – John Youngblood
- 2017 – Marquis Haynes
- 2018 – CJ Moore
- 2019 – Austrian Robinson
- 2020 – Jaylon Jones
- 2021 – Keidron Smith
- 2022 – KD Hill
- 2023 – Cedric Johnson
- 2024 – JJ Pegues
- 2025 – Tyler Banks
- 2026 - Suntarine Perkins

Mullins's story was memorialized in a documentary film, Undefeated: The Chucky Mullins Story and also the SEC Storied Documentary film, "It's Time".

== Further information ==
- Former Auburn Tigers defensive back Zach Gilbert, who is a cousin of Mullins, wore number 38 in his honor.
- Former Rebels and San Francisco 49ers linebacker Patrick Willis was the first recipient of the Chucky Mullins Award after the number was retired.
- A book was written by author Larry Woody about the incident: Dixie Farewell: The Life and Death of Chucky Mullins (1994) Eggman Publishing
- Rev. Jody Hill, a former Ole Miss teammate of Mullins, also wrote a book: 38: The Chucky Mullins Effect (Deeds Publishing (August 12, 2014), ISBN 978-1941165324).

== See also ==
- List of gridiron football players who died during their careers
