= 1989 Alabama Crimson Tide football team =

American college football season

1989 Alabama Crimson Tide football

SEC co-champion

Sugar Bowl, L 25–33 vs. Miami (FL)
- Conference: Southeastern Conference

Ranking
- Coaches: No. 7
- AP: No. 9
- Record: 10–2 (6–1 SEC)
- Head coach: Bill Curry (3rd season)
- Offensive coordinator: Homer Smith (2nd season)
- Defensive coordinator: Don Lindsey (3rd season)
- Captains: Marco Battle; Willie Wyatt
- Home stadium: Bryant–Denny Stadium; Legion Field

1989 Southeastern Conference football standings
	Conf.					Overall
Team	W		L		T	W		L		T
No. 5 Tennessee +	6	–	1	–	0	11	–	1	–	0
No. 9 Alabama +	6	–	1	–	0	10	–	2	–	0
No. 6 Auburn +	6	–	1	–	0	10	–	2	–	0
Florida	4	–	3	–	0	7	–	5	–	0
Ole Miss	4	–	3	–	0	8	–	4	–	0
Georgia	4	–	3	–	0	6	–	6	–	0
Kentucky	2	–	5	–	0	6	–	5	–	0
LSU	2	–	5	–	0	4	–	7	–	0
Mississippi State	1	–	6	–	0	5	–	6	–	0
Vanderbilt	0	–	7	–	0	1	–	10	–	0
+ – Conference co-champions; Rankings from AP Poll

The 1989 Alabama Crimson Tide football team (variously "Alabama", "UA", "Bama" or "The Tide") represented the University of Alabama in the 1989 NCAA Division I-A football season. It was the Crimson Tide's 97th overall and 56th season as a member of the Southeastern Conference (SEC). The team was led by head coach Bill Curry, in his third year, and played their home games at both Bryant–Denny Stadium in Tuscaloosa and Legion Field in Birmingham, Alabama. They finished the season with a record of ten wins and two losses (10–2 overall, 6–1 in the SEC), as SEC co-champions and with a loss in the Sugar Bowl against national championship winner Miami.

Alabama won its first ten games en route to its best record since 1980 and first SEC championship since the 1981 season, its 19th overall. Highlights of the season included a 62–27 victory over Ole Miss after falling behind 21–0, a 47–30 victory over Tennessee in a match of unbeatens, and a 17–16 victory over Penn State in which Alabama blocked an 18-yard field goal try with 13 seconds left in the game for the win. The 32–16 win at LSU featured a first for the Crimson Tide, as Alabama safety Lee Ozmint scored the first ever defensive two-point conversion in school history on a 100-yard interception return of an LSU two-point conversion attempt.

However, in the season finale against Auburn—the first Iron Bowl ever played in Auburn, Alabama—the Tigers beat Alabama 30–20. As a result, Alabama, Auburn and Tennessee finished in a three-way tie for the conference championship. Alabama would however receive the conference's Sugar Bowl berth.

In the Sugar Bowl, Miami would defeat Alabama 33–25 and be named national champions.

In the week after the Sugar Bowl loss, on January 7, 1990, Bill Curry resigned his position to take the head coaching job at Kentucky.

== Schedule ==
Date	Time	Opponent	Rank	Site	TV	Result	Attendance	Source
September 16	1:30 p.m.	Memphis State*	No. 16	Legion Field; Birmingham, AL		W 35–7	75,962	
September 23	12:00 p.m.	Kentucky	No. 15	Bryant–Denny Stadium; Tuscaloosa, AL	WTBS	W 15–3	70,123	
September 30	11:30 a.m.	at Vanderbilt	No. 13	Vanderbilt Stadium; Nashville, TN	WTBS	W 20–14	29,106	
October 7	1:30 p.m.	at Ole Miss	No. 13	Mississippi Veterans Memorial Stadium; Jackson, MS (rivalry)		W 62–27	55,000	
October 14	1:30 p.m.	Southwestern Louisiana*^{†}	No. 11	Bryant–Denny Stadium; Tuscaloosa, AL		W 24–17	70,123	
October 21	11:00 a.m.	No. 6 Tennessee	No. 10	Legion Field; Birmingham, AL (Third Saturday in October)	CBS	W 47–30	75,962	
October 28	1:30 p.m.	at No. 14 Penn State*	No. 6	Beaver Stadium; University Park, PA (rivalry)	CBS	W 17–16	85,975	
November 4	11:30 a.m.	Mississippi State	No. 4	Legion Field; Birmingham, AL (rivalry)	WTBS	W 23–10	75,962	
November 11	6:30 p.m.	at LSU	No. 4	Tiger Stadium; Baton Rouge, LA (rivalry)	ESPN	W 32–16	77,197	
November 18	1:30 p.m.	Southern Miss*	No. 4	Bryant–Denny Stadium; Tuscaloosa, AL		W 37–14	70,123	
December 2	1:00 p.m.	at No. 11 Auburn	No. 2	Jordan–Hare Stadium; Auburn, AL (Iron Bowl)	CBS	L 20–30	85,214	
January 1, 1990	7:30 p.m.	vs. No. 2 Miami (FL)*	No. 7	Louisiana Superdome; New Orleans, LA (Sugar Bowl)	ABC	L 25–33	77,452	
*Non-conference game; ^{†}Homecoming; Rankings from AP Poll released prior to the game; All times are in Central time; Source:

== Game summaries ==
=== Vs. Miami (FL) (Sugar Bowl) ===
#2 Miami (FL) at #7 Alabama

Team	1	2	3	4	Total
• Hurricanes	7	13	6	7	33
Crimson Tide	0	17	0	8	25

- Date: January 1
- Location: Louisiana Superdome, New Orleans
- Game attendance: 77,452
- Game weather: Indoors
- Referee: John Nealon (Big Ten)
- TV announcers (ABC): Al Michaels, Frank Gifford, and Dan Dierdorf

== Roster ==
1989 Alabama Crimson Tide football team roster
Players
Coaches
Offense

Pos.	#	Name	Class
QB	7	Jeff Dunn	Sr
TB	27	Siran Stacy	Jr
WR	17	Dabo Swinney	Fr
FL	32	Prince Wimbley	So

Defense

Pos.	#	Name	Class
LB	86	Keith McCants	Jr

Special teams

Pos.	#	Name	Class
K	17	Philip Doyle	Jr

Head coach

- Bill Curry

Coordinators/assistant coaches

- Tommy Bowden – Wide receivers

Legend

- (C) Team captain
- (S) Suspended
- (I) Ineligible
- Injured
- Redshirt
