= 1989 Freedom Bowl =

- Freedom Bowl VI
Washington Huskies	Florida Gators
(7–4)	(7–4)
Pac-10	SEC
34	7
Head coach: Don James	Head coach: Gary Darnell (interim)
	1	2	3	4	Total
Washington	17	10	0	7	34
Florida	7	0	0	0	7
- Date: December 30, 1989
- Season: 1989
- Stadium: Anaheim Stadium
- Location: Anaheim, California
- Favorite: Washington by 2½ to 3 points
- Referee: Pat Sweeney (WAC)
- Attendance: 33,858

United States TV coverage
- Network: NBC
- Announcers: Joel Meyers and Paul Maguire

The 1989 Freedom Bowl was a college football bowl game played on December 30 at Anaheim Stadium in Anaheim, California. The game featured the Washington Huskies of the Pacific-10 Conference and the Florida Gators of the Southeastern Conference, who were led by junior Emmitt Smith, a consensus All-American at running back.

== Teams ==
=== Washington ===
The Huskies opened with two wins, lost three straight, then won five of six to finish the regular season at 7–4, tied for second in the Pac-10.

=== Florida ===
The Gators lost their opener, won six straight, then lost three of four to finish the regular season at 7–4, tied for fourth in the SEC. Head coach Galen Hall resigned in early October after allegations of NCAA rules violations, and defensive coordinator Gary Darnell was the interim head coach.

== Game ==
Washington built a twenty-point lead at halftime and won 34–7. Smith gained only 17 yards on seven carries, as Florida was forced to go to the air in the second half. It was Smith's lowest rushing total since his first game as a freshman, when he was a reserve.

== Scoring ==
First quarter

- Washington – Mario Bailey 21 pass from Cary Conklin (John McCallum kick)
- Florida – Donald Douglas 67 run (John David Francis kick)
- Washington – Field goal, McCallum 21
- Washington – Andre Riley 10 pass from Conklin (McCallum kick)

Second quarter

- Washington – Jaime Fields recovered blocked punt in end zone (McCallum kick)
- Washington – Field goal, McCallum 32

Third quarter

No scoring

Fourth quarter

- Washington – Mark Brunell 20 run (McCallum kick)

== Statistics ==
Statistics	Washington	Florida
First downs	28	10
Rushes–yards	45–191	25–83
Passing yards	242	148
Passes	24–44–0	11–28–1
Total yards	433	231
Punts–average	7–37	8–33
Fumbles–lost	0–0	7–3
Turnovers by	0	4
Penalties-yards	9–86	9–85
Time of possession	41:52	18:08

== Aftermath ==
Unranked since early October, Washington was #23 in the final AP poll, and played in the next three Rose Bowls, which included a shared national championship after the second. Florida hired alumnus Steve Spurrier as head coach the next day, and he led the Gators for twelve seasons. Smith skipped his senior season and was selected seventeenth overall in the 1990 NFL draft; he won three Super Bowls with the Dallas Cowboys and is a member of the Pro Football Hall of Fame.

This was the last bowl game between the Pac-10 and SEC until the 2010 season, when Auburn met Oregon in the national championship game in Arizona. It also marks Washington's only win against an SEC team, as of 2025.
