= 1989 Georgia Bulldogs football team =

American college football season

1989 Georgia Bulldogs football

Peach Bowl, L 18–19 vs. Syracuse
- Conference: Southeastern Conference
- Record: 6–6 (4–3 SEC)
- Head coach: Ray Goff (1st season)
- Offensive coordinator: George Haffner (10th season)
- Offensive scheme: Multiple
- Defensive coordinator: Richard Bell (1st season)
- Base defense: 3–4
- Home stadium: Sanford Stadium

1989 Southeastern Conference football standings
	Conf.					Overall
Team	W		L		T	W		L		T
No. 5 Tennessee +	6	–	1	–	0	11	–	1	–	0
No. 9 Alabama +	6	–	1	–	0	10	–	2	–	0
No. 6 Auburn +	6	–	1	–	0	10	–	2	–	0
Florida	4	–	3	–	0	7	–	5	–	0
Ole Miss	4	–	3	–	0	8	–	4	–	0
Georgia	4	–	3	–	0	6	–	6	–	0
Kentucky	2	–	5	–	0	6	–	5	–	0
LSU	2	–	5	–	0	4	–	7	–	0
Mississippi State	1	–	6	–	0	5	–	6	–	0
Vanderbilt	0	–	7	–	0	1	–	10	–	0
+ – Conference co-champions; Rankings from AP Poll

The 1989 Georgia Bulldogs football team represented the University of Georgia as a member of the Southeastern Conference (SEC) during the 1989 NCAA Division I-A football season. Led by first-year head coach Ray Goff, the Bulldogs compiled an overall record of 6–6, with a mark of 4–3 in conference play, and finished tied for fifth in the SEC.

== Schedule ==
Date	Time	Opponent	Rank	Site	TV	Result	Attendance	Source
September 16	12:30 p.m.	Baylor*		Sanford Stadium; Athens, GA	TBS	W 15–3	82,007	
September 23	1:00 p.m.	Mississippi State		Sanford Stadium; Athens, GA		W 23–6	82,122	
September 30	1:00 p.m.	South Carolina*	No. 23	Sanford Stadium; Athens, GA (rivalry)		L 20–24	80,961	
October 7	7:00 p.m.	at No. 6 Tennessee		Neyland Stadium; Knoxville, TN (rivalry)	ESPN	L 14–17	96,058	
October 14	12:30 p.m.	at Ole Miss		Vaught–Hemingway Stadium; Oxford, MS	TBS	L 13–17	31,000	
October 21	2:00 p.m.	at Vanderbilt		Vanderbilt Stadium; Nashville, TN (rivalry)		W 35–16	40,691	
October 28	1:00 p.m.	Kentucky		Sanford Stadium; Athens, GA		W 34–23	81,987	
November 4	1:00 p.m.	Temple*^{†}		Sanford Stadium; Athens, GA		W 37–10	80,011	
November 11	12:30 p.m.	vs. No. 20 Florida		Gator Bowl; Jacksonville, FL (rivalry)	TBS	W 17–10	81,577	
November 18	12:30 p.m.	No. 10 Auburn		Sanford Stadium; Athens, GA (rivalry)	TBS	L 3–20	82,122	
December 2	1:00 p.m.	at Georgia Tech*		Bobby Dodd Stadium; Atlanta, GA (rivalry)		L 22–33	46,064	
December 30	2:30 p.m.	vs. Syracuse*		Atlanta–Fulton County Stadium; Atlanta, GA (Peach Bowl)	ABC	L 18–19	44,911	
*Non-conference game; ^{†}Homecoming; Rankings from AP Poll released prior to the game; All times are in Eastern time

== Roster ==
1989 Georgia Bulldogs football team roster
Players
Coaches
Offense

Pos.	#	Name	Class
TE	85	Chris Broom
RB	7	Rodney Hampton	Jr

Defense

Pos.	#	Name	Class
LB	44	John Allen	So
DT	95	Bill Goldberg	Sr
SS	25	David Hargett	Jr
LB	57	Mo Lewis	Jr

Special teams

Pos.	#	Name	Class
P	1	Joey Hester	Sr
K	3	John Kasay	Jr

Head coach

- Ray Goff

Coordinators/assistant coaches

- Joe Hollis
  (Offensive line)

Legend

- (C) Team captain
- (S) Suspended
- (I) Ineligible
- Injured
- Redshirt

== Team players drafted into the NFL ==
The following players were drafted into professional football following the season.

Player	Position	Round	Pick	Franchise
Bill Goldberg	Linebacker	11	301	Los Angeles Rams
