= 1990 Hall of Fame Bowl =

- 4th Hall of Fame Bowl
Auburn Tigers	Ohio State Buckeyes
(9–2)	(8–3)
SEC	Big Ten
31	14
Head coach: Pat Dye	Head coach: John Cooper
AP / Coaches; 9 / 10	AP / Coaches; 21 / NR
	1	2	3	4	Total
Auburn	3	7	7	14	31
Ohio State	7	7	0	0	14
- Date: January 1, 1990
- Season: 1989
- Stadium: Tampa Stadium
- Location: Tampa, Florida
- MVP: Reggie Slack (Auburn QB)
- Referee: Bill McDonald (CIFOA)

United States TV coverage
- Network: NBC
- Announcers: Don Criqui (play-by-play), Ahmad Rashad (color), Jim Donovan (sideline)

The 1990 Hall of Fame Bowl featured the ninth-ranked Auburn Tigers, and the 20th-ranked Ohio State Buckeyes. It was the fourth edition to the Hall of Fame Bowl.

Ohio State scored first following a 1-yard touchdown run from Carlos Snow opening up a 7–0 lead. Auburn's Win Lyle kicked a 19-yard field goal, and Ohio State led 7–3 after one quarter. In the second quarter, Ohio State's Greg Frey connected with Brian Stablein from nine yards out to take a 14–3 lead. Reggie Slack threw an 11-yard touchdown pass to Greg Taylor as Ohio State took a 14–10 lead to halftime.

In the third quarter, Slack and Taylor connected on another 4-yard touchdown pass, as Auburn took a 17–14 lead. In the fourth quarter, Slack scored on a 5-yard touchdown run opening a 24–14 Auburn lead. A 2-yard touchdown pass from Slack to Herbert Casey made the final margin 31–14 in favor of Auburn.
