= Randy Baldwin =

American football player (born 1967)

No. 23, 37
- Position: Running back

Personal information
- Born: August 19, 1967 (age 59); Griffin, Georgia, U.S.
- Listed height: 5 ft 10 in (1.78 m)
- Listed weight: 220 lb (100 kg)

Career information
- High school: Griffin
- College: Mississippi
- NFL draft: 1991: 4th round, 92nd overall pick

Career history
- Minnesota Vikings (1991); Cleveland Browns (1991–1994); Carolina Panthers (1995); San Francisco 49ers (1995); Baltimore Ravens (1996)

Awards and highlights
- First-team All-SEC (1990)

Career NFL statistics
- Rushing yards: 231
- Rushing average: 3.1
- Touchdowns: 2
- Kick returns: 117
- Return yards: 2,607
- Stats at Pro Football Reference

Randy Chadwick Baldwin (born August 19, 1967) is an American former professional football player who was a running back and kick returner for six seasons in the National Football League (NFL) with the Minnesota Vikings, Cleveland Browns, Carolina Panthers and Baltimore Ravens.

After playing college football for the Ole Miss Rebels, Baldwin was taken in the fourth round of the 1991 NFL draft by the Minnesota Vikings where he would play four games as a Special teams player and returning one kickoff for 14 yards. The following season, he joined the Cleveland Browns, where he would spend three seasons as both a kick returner and backup running back. While with the Browns, Baldwin scored the only two touchdowns of his career, one receiving touchdown in 1993 and a one on a kick return in 1994. He joined the expansion Carolina Panthers in 1995 and expansion Baltimore Ravens in 1996 before retiring after the 1996 season.
