= Reggie Slack =

American football player (born 1968)

No. 8, 10, 17
- Position: Quarterback

Personal information
- Born: May 2, 1968 (age 58); Milton, Florida, U.S.

Career information
- High school: Milton
- College: Auburn
- NFL draft: 1990: 12th round, 321st overall pick

Career history
- Houston Oilers (1990–1992); New York/New Jersey Knights (1992); Toronto Argonauts (1993–1994); Hamilton Tiger-Cats (1994); Birmingham Barracudas (1995); Winnipeg Blue Bombers (1995–1996); Saskatchewan Roughriders (1997–1999); Toronto Argonauts (2002); Hamilton Tiger-Cats (2003)

Awards and highlights
- First-team All-SEC (1988); 1990 Hall of Fame Bowl MVP

Reginald Slack (born May 2, 1968) is an American former professional football player who was a quarterback in the Canadian Football League (CFL). He played college football for the Auburn Tigers. He also played professionally in the World League of American Football (WLAF).

After spending his collegiate career at Auburn University, Slack was selected in the 12th round (321st overall) of the 1990 NFL draft by the Houston Oilers. He also played in the WLAF for the New York/New Jersey Knights and then played in the CFL with the Winnipeg Blue Bombers and the Saskatchewan Roughriders, whom he led to a Grey Cup appearance in 1997.

Since retiring from football, in 2014 Slack opened a pizza restaurant in Navarre, Florida.
