= 1989 Tennessee Volunteers football team =

American college football season

1989 Tennessee Volunteers football

SEC co-champion Cotton Bowl Classic champion

Cotton Bowl Classic, W 31–27 vs. Arkansas
- Conference: Southeastern Conference

Ranking
- Coaches: No. 5
- AP: No. 5
- Record: 11–1 (6–1 SEC)
- Head coach: Johnny Majors (13th season)
- Offensive coordinator: Phillip Fulmer (1st season)
- Defensive coordinator: Doug Mathews (1st season)
- Captain: Eric Still
- Home stadium: Neyland Stadium

1989 Southeastern Conference football standings
	Conf.					Overall
Team	W		L		T	W		L		T
No. 5 Tennessee +	6	–	1	–	0	11	–	1	–	0
No. 9 Alabama +	6	–	1	–	0	10	–	2	–	0
No. 6 Auburn +	6	–	1	–	0	10	–	2	–	0
Florida	4	–	3	–	0	7	–	5	–	0
Ole Miss	4	–	3	–	0	8	–	4	–	0
Georgia	4	–	3	–	0	6	–	6	–	0
Kentucky	2	–	5	–	0	6	–	5	–	0
LSU	2	–	5	–	0	4	–	7	–	0
Mississippi State	1	–	6	–	0	5	–	6	–	0
Vanderbilt	0	–	7	–	0	1	–	10	–	0
+ – Conference co-champions; Rankings from AP Poll

The 1989 Tennessee Volunteers football team represented the University of Tennessee in the 1989 NCAA Division I-A football season. Playing as a member of the Southeastern Conference (SEC), the team was led by head coach Johnny Majors, in his 13th year, and played their home games at Neyland Stadium in Knoxville, Tennessee. They finished the season with a record of eleven wins and one loss (11–1 overall, 6–1 in the SEC), as SEC co-champion, and with a victory over Arkansas in the Cotton Bowl Classic. The Volunteers offense scored 346 points while the defense allowed 217 points.

== Schedule ==
Date	Opponent	Rank	Site	TV	Result	Attendance	Source
September 2	Colorado State*		Neyland Stadium; Knoxville, TN		W 17–14	93,652	
September 9	at No. 6 UCLA*		Rose Bowl; Pasadena, CA	PPV	W 24–6	54,316	
September 16	Duke*	No. 17	Neyland Stadium; Knoxville, TN		W 28–6	93,659	
September 30	No. 4 Auburn	No. 12	Neyland Stadium; Knoxville, TN (rivalry)	CBS	W 21–14	95,341	
October 7	Georgia^{†}	No. 6	Neyland Stadium; Knoxville, TN (rivalry)	ESPN	W 17–14	96,058	
October 21	at No. 10 Alabama	No. 6	Legion Field; Birmingham, AL (Third Saturday in October)	CBS	L 30–47	75,962	
October 28	at LSU	No. 11	Tiger Stadium; Baton Rouge, LA	TBS	W 45–39	71,634	
November 11	Akron*	No. 11	Neyland Stadium; Knoxville, TN		W 52–9	91,833	
November 18	Ole Miss	No. 9	Neyland Stadium; Knoxville, TN (rivalry)	PPV	W 33–21	93,851	
November 25	at Kentucky	No. 8	Commonwealth Stadium; Lexington, KY (rivalry)	ESPN	W 31–10	55,237	
December 2	Vanderbilt	No. 8	Neyland Stadium; Knoxville, TN (rivalry)	TBS	W 17–10	92,975	
January 1, 1990	vs. No. 10 Arkansas*	No. 8	Cotton Bowl; Dallas, TX (Cotton Bowl Classic)	CBS	W 31–27	74,358	
*Non-conference game; ^{†}Homecoming; Rankings from AP Poll released prior to the game

== Team players drafted into the NFL ==
Player	Position	Round	Pick	NFL club
Reggie Cobb	Running Back	2	30	Tampa Bay Buccaneers
Marion Hobby	Defensive End	3	74	Minnesota Vikings
Eric Still	Guard	4	99	Houston Oilers
Tracy Hayworth	Linebacker	7	174	Detroit Lions
Kent Elmore	Punter	7	190	Los Angeles Rams
Thomas Woods	Wide Receiver	8	205	Miami Dolphins
