= 1989 Auburn Tigers football team =

American college football season

1989 Auburn Tigers football

SEC co-champion Hall of Fame Bowl champion

Hall of Fame Bowl, W 31–14 vs. Ohio State
- Conference: Southeastern Conference

Ranking
- Coaches: No. 6
- AP: No. 6
- Record: 10–2 (6–1 SEC)
- Head coach: Pat Dye (9th season)
- Defensive coordinator: Wayne Hall (4th season)
- Home stadium: Jordan–Hare Stadium

1989 Southeastern Conference football standings
	Conf.					Overall
Team	W		L		T	W		L		T
No. 5 Tennessee +	6	–	1	–	0	11	–	1	–	0
No. 9 Alabama +	6	–	1	–	0	10	–	2	–	0
No. 6 Auburn +	6	–	1	–	0	10	–	2	–	0
Florida	4	–	3	–	0	7	–	5	–	0
Ole Miss	4	–	3	–	0	8	–	4	–	0
Georgia	4	–	3	–	0	6	–	6	–	0
Kentucky	2	–	5	–	0	6	–	5	–	0
LSU	2	–	5	–	0	4	–	7	–	0
Mississippi State	1	–	6	–	0	5	–	6	–	0
Vanderbilt	0	–	7	–	0	1	–	10	–	0
+ – Conference co-champions; Rankings from AP Poll

The 1989 Auburn Tigers football team represented Auburn University in the 1989 NCAA Division I-A football season. Coached by Pat Dye, the team finished the season with a 10–2 record and won their third straight SEC title. On December 2, Alabama visited Auburn on their home campus for the first time in the history of the Iron Bowl. Auburn won, 30–20, went on to beat Ohio State in the Hall of Fame Bowl, and finished the season ranked #6 in both major polls.

== Schedule ==
Date	Opponent	Rank	Site	TV	Result	Attendance	Source
September 9	Pacific (CA)*	No. 5	Jordan-Hare Stadium; Auburn, AL		W 55–0	77,000	
September 16	Southern Miss*	No. 5	Jordan-Hare Stadium; Auburn, AL		W 24–3	83,465	
September 30	at No. 12 Tennessee	No. 4	Neyland Stadium; Knoxville, TN (rivalry)	CBS	L 14–21	95,341	
October 7	at Kentucky	No. 11	Commonwealth Stadium; Lexington, KY		W 24–12	55,688	
October 14	LSU	No. 12	Jordan-Hare Stadium; Auburn, AL (rivalry)	CBS	W 10–6	85,214	
October 21	at No. 14 Florida State*	No. 11	Doak Campbell Stadium; Tallahassee, FL	ESPN	L 14–22	62,711	
October 28	Mississippi State^{†}	No. 16	Jordan-Hare Stadium; Auburn, AL		W 14–0	84,105	
November 4	No. 19 Florida	No. 12	Jordan-Hare Stadium; Auburn, AL (rivalry)	ESPN	W 10–7	85,214	
November 11	Louisiana Tech*	No. 12	Jordan-Hare Stadium; Auburn, AL		W 38–23	77,237	
November 18	at Georgia	No. 11	Sanford Stadium; Athens, GA (rivalry)	TBS	W 20–3	82,122	
December 2	No. 2 Alabama	No. 11	Jordan-Hare Stadium; Auburn, AL (Iron Bowl)	CBS	W 30–20	85,319	
January 1	vs. No. 21 Ohio State*	No. 9	Tampa Stadium; Tampa, FL (Hall of Fame Bowl)	NBC	W 31–14	52,535	
*Non-conference game; ^{†}Homecoming; Rankings from AP Poll released prior to the game

== Personnel ==
1989 Auburn Tigers football team roster
Players
Coaches
Offense

Pos.	#	Name	Class
RB		Kelly Brooks
OT	64	Anthony Brown
RB		Teapot Brown
WR		Herbert Casey
WR	28	Pedro Cherry	Fr
RB	32	Stacy Danley	Jr
TE	86	Chris Gray	Fr
TE	87	Victor Hall
WR	19	Melvin Hines	So
OL	66	John Hudson
RB	10	James Joseph	Jr
OL	67	Ed King
QB	2	Corey Lewis	Jr
QB		Frank McIntosh
OT	70	Bob Meeks	So
WR	4	Dale Overton	So
OL		Mark Rose
OT	78	Rob Shelby
QB	17	Reggie Slack	Sr
RB	21	Alex Smith	So
RB		Alex Strong
RB		Horace Stroud
WR	16	Greg Taylor
WR	8	Shayne Wasden
RB		Darrell Williams
WR	18	Alexander Wright	Sr

Defense

Pos.	#	Name	Class
DB	12	Corey Barlow	So
LB		Eltin Billingslea
LB	56	Darrel Crawford	So
DL		Fernando Horn
DB		Charles Kelly
LB		Craig Ogletree
CB	27	Eric Ramsey	Jr
LB		Quentin Riggins
DT	95	David Rocker
DL	93	Richard Shea
S	29	Alex Stankunas	So
DL		Walter Tate
S	30	Dennis Wallace	Jr
S, CB	9	John Wiley	Jr
DT	72	Jon Wilson

Special teams

Pos.	#	Name	Class
K		Win Lyle
P	1	Richie Nell
K	3	Jim Von Wyl	So

Head coach

- Pat Dye

Coordinators/assistant coaches

Legend

- (C) Team captain
- (S) Suspended
- (I) Ineligible
- Injured
- Redshirt

== Game summaries ==
=== Pacific (CA) ===
The season opener proved to be one of the most lopsided affairs Auburn had seen in years. On the first play from scrimmage, wide receiver Alexander Wright scored on a 78-yard screen play and the Tigers never looked back. They scored on 5 of their first 7 drives and held a 35–0 lead at halftime intermission. The defense held Pacific to 92 yards of total offense and 4 first downs. Alexander Wright caught 5 passes for 263 yards and 4 scores. His performance earned him National Offensive Player of the Week honors.

=== Southern Miss ===
Auburn ditched the air attack that worked to perfection against Pacific and relied on a more traditional downhill running game to wear down the Eagles. Implementing a two-back game plan, tailback James Joseph ran for 149 yards on 24 carries and counterpart Stacy Danley picked up 102 on 21 touches. The defense held Southern and their Heisman hopeful quarterback Brett Favre to 174 yards in a 24-3 victory. Lamar Rogers was named National Defensive Player of the Week for an effort that included 3 sacks, 3 tackles for loss, and a forced fumble.

=== At Tennessee ===
Pat Dye's defense surrendered over 350 yards on the ground, the most an Auburn defense had allowed in 13 years. 225 came from the legs of Volunteer running back Reggie Cobb, making him the first player to eclipse the 100-yard mark against the Tigers in three seasons. Despite the performance of the defensive front, Auburn still had a chance to tie late but Reggie Slack's fourth-down pass to Alexander Wright fell incomplete with 1:19 left.

=== At Kentucky ===
Quarterback Reggie Slack threw for 161 yards in the first half and tossed two 1st quarter touchdowns, a 24-yard strike to Greg Taylor and a 34-yard bomb to Pedro Cherry, to give Auburn a 14-0 lead. The scrappy Wildcats continued to put up a fight in the second half, narrowing the margin to 14-6 in the 3rd quarter and 21-12 in the 4th, but a late 40-yard field goal from the leg of Win Lyle was the clincher.

=== LSU ===
In a classic defensive slug fest, both offenses were held in check for most of the afternoon. The 1st half ended in a 3-3 stand still and the Bengal Tigers had managed to score a field goal on the opening drive of the third quarter. LSU held on to their 6-3 advantage well into the final 15 minutes of play. But the field position battle was titled when wide out Shane Wasden fielded a punt at the Auburn 30 and scampered up the sidelines to the LSU 37. Seven plays later, Stacy Danley bulldozed into the end zone from 1 yard out to take a 10-6 lead with 6:07 left in the game. From here, the Tiger defense stiffened and Danley was able to burn out the rest of the clock on the ensuing possession.

=== At Florida State ===
A 16-point second quarter doomed the visiting Tigers as Florida State was able to build a 22-3 lead going into the second half. The Seminoles were held off the scoreboard the rest of the night, but Auburn was only able to muster two scores and 265 yards as they fell 22-14 in Tallahassee.

=== Mississippi State ===
On his 22nd birthday, James Joseph gutted the Bulldog defense for 172 yards on a hefty 35 carries. Auburn played ball control for most of the afternoon, calling mostly running plays and only passing 14 times. Slack scored on a bootleg in the 3rd quarter and Joseph plunged in from 1-yard out to put it away in the 4th as the Tigers held on to a 14-0 homecoming win.

=== Florida ===
#19 Florida Gators (6–1) at #12 Auburn Tigers (5–2)

Quarter	1	2	3	4	Total
Florida	7	0	0	0	7
Auburn	0	0	3	7	10

at Jordan–Hare Stadium, Auburn, Alabama

- Date: November 4
- Game attendance: 85,214
- TV: ESPN

Game information

First quarter

- FLA – Emmitt Smith 5-yard run (John David Francis kick), 4:09. Florida 7–0.

Second quarter

- No scoring

Third quarter

- AUB – Win Lyle 47-yard field goal, 2:18. Florida 7–3.

Fourth quarter

- AUB – Shayne Wasden 25-yard pass from Reggie Slack (Win Lyle kick), 0:26. Auburn 10–7.

Top passers

- FLA – Donald Douglas – 1/5, 6 yards
- AUB – Reggie Slack – 12/19, 143 yards, TD

Top rushers

- FLA – Emmitt Smith – 27 rushes, 86 yards, TD
- AUB – James Joseph – 26 rushes, 55 yards

Top receivers

- FLA – Kirk Kirkpatrick – 1 reception, 6 yards
- AUB – James Joseph – 3 receptions, 47 yards

Auburn defeated the Florida Gators 10–7 at Jordan–Hare Stadium in 1989. Auburn’s offense struggled for much of the game, while its defense limited Florida’s scoring opportunities and held leading rusher Emmitt Smith to 86 yards. Trailing 7–3 late in the fourth quarter, Auburn faced fourth-and-11 at the Florida 25-yard line with 26 seconds remaining. Quarterback Reggie Slack completed a touchdown pass to wide receiver Shane Wasden to give Auburn the lead. Linebacker Quentin Riggins recorded 23 tackles and was named National Defensive Player of the Week.

=== Louisiana Tech ===
Auburn benefited from a second quarter explosion that yielded 28 points in 2:29 minutes of play to trump vising Tech 38-23. With the score standing at 10-7, freshman sensation Darrell "Lectron" Williams darted through the Bulldog defense for 36 yards and a score to put the tally at 14-10. After forcing a three-n-out, Auburn scored on the second play of their next possession on a 37-yard pass from Slack to Wright to increase the margin to 21-10. Then after La Tech fumbled ensuing kickoff, Wright scored from 14 yards out on the next play on a reverse. Then after Tech regained possession, Craig Ogletree intercepted a Bulldog pass on the first play from scrimmage and Williams ran it in from 15 yards out on the following play. In less than three minutes, Auburn went from trailing 10-7 to leading 35-10.

=== At Georgia ===
Auburn played their most complete game of the season against Georgia, out gaining the Dogs 468-221 and dominating the time of possession. The Tigers mounted 17-0 first half lead and played keep away for the remaining 30 minutes. Lectron Williams ran for 128 yards on 26 carries as James Joseph was nursing an injury. Defensively, Craig Ogletree had one of the finest games of his career with 11 total tackles and 9 quarterback pressures and John Wiley earned SEC Defensive Player of the Week honors with two red zone interceptions.

=== Alabama ===
In what is known as the most emotional day in Auburn football history, Alabama was forced to play Auburn in Auburn for the first time ever. The Tide were 10-0, ranked #2, and eyeing a national championship match up with Miami. Auburn had something at stake as well - a third straight SEC title. In front of a national audience and roaring crowd of 86,000, the Tigers downed 'Bama by the count of 30-20. Stacy Danley had a huge afternoon with 170 yards on 28 carries and Lectron Williams had a monumental 12-yard touchdown scamper to put Auburn ahead 24-10 in the 4th quarter. The Tide managed somewhat of a comeback, cutting the lead to 27-20 late, but a 34-yard Lyle field goal with 30 seconds left iced the victory.

=== Hall of Fame Bowl (vs Ohio State) ===
Hall of Fame Bowl: #9 Auburn Tigers (9–2) vs. #21 Ohio State Buckeyes (8–3)

Quarter	1	2	3	4	Total
Ohio St	7	7	0	0	14
Auburn	3	7	7	14	31

at Tampa Stadium, Tampa, Florida

- Date: January 1, 1990
- Game time: 1:00 p.m. EDT
- Game weather: Partly cloudy, 64 °F (18 °C)
- Game attendance: 52,535
- Referee: Bill McDonald
- TV announcers (NBC): Don Criqui
- Box Score

Game information

First quarter

- OSU – Carlos Snow 1-yard run (Pat O'Morrow kick), 6:50. Ohio St 7–0. Drive: 5 plays, 80 yards, 1:40.
- AUB – Win Lyle 19-yard field goal, 2:14. Ohio St 7–3. Drive: 10 plays, 38 yards, 4:36.

Second quarter

- OSU Brian Stablein 9-yard pass from Greg Frey (Pat O'Morrow kick), 13:36. Ohio St 14–3. Drive: 10 plays, 81 yards, 3:38.
- AUB – Greg Taylor 11-yard pass from Reggie Slack (Win Lyle kick), 0:11. Ohio St 14–10. Drive: 3 plays, 33 yards 0:37.

Third quarter

- AUB – Greg Taylor 4-yard pass from Reggie Slack (Win Lyle kick), 9:50. Auburn 17–14. Drive: 9 plays, 49 yards, 3:58.

Fourth quarter

- AUB – Reggie Slack 5-yard run (Win Lyle kick), 9:22. Auburn 24–14. Drive: 16 plays, 80 yards, 3:33.
- AUB – Herbert Casey 2-yard pass from Reggie Slack (Win Lyle kick), 7:20. Auburn 31–14. Drive: 3 plays, 32 yards, 0:57.

Top passers

- OSU – Greg Frey – 16/31, 232 yards, TD, INT
- AUB – Reggie Slack – 16/22, 141 yards, 3 TD, 2 INT

Top rushers

- OSU – Scottie Graham – 12 rushes, 53 yards
- AUB – Stacy Danley – 20 rushes, 85 yards

Top receivers

- OSU – Jeff Graham – 5 receptions, 105 yards
- AUB – Alexander Wright – 4 receptions, 59 yards

The Tigers responded to a 14-3 first half deficit to rout the Buckeyes in the Hall of Fame Bowl. Greg Taylor caught two touchdowns from Slack and Danley wore out the opposing defense as Auburn rode a 28-point unanswered run to close out a 31-14 victory and a 10-2 campaign.
