= 1989 NCAA Division I-A football season =

American college football season

1989 NCAA Division I-A season
- Number of teams: 106
- Preseason AP No. 1: Michigan

Postseason
- Bowl games: 18
- Heisman Trophy: Houston quarterback Andre Ware
- Champion(s): Miami (FL) (AP, Coaches, FWAA)

Division I-A football seasons
- ← 1988 1990 →

The 1989 NCAA Division I-A football season ended with Miami (FL) winning its third National Championship during the 1980s, cementing its claim as the decade's top team, winning more titles than any other program.

Notre Dame signed a six-year, $30 million deal with NBC, granting the network the exclusive rights to broadcast Notre Dame football. However, the deal would not start until 1991.

Florida State began 0–2 but finished the season 10–2, having beaten the National Champions Miami earlier in the season and beating Nebraska in the Fiesta Bowl.

Oklahoma coach Barry Switzer resigned June 19 after 16 seasons, during which he led the Sooners to three national championships (1974, 1975, 1985).

Michigan coach Bo Schembechler retired following the season. Steve Spurrier was hired by Florida away from Duke in an effort to clean up after a decade of NCAA sanctions.

Houston quarterback Andre Ware ran the run and shoot offense all the way to the Heisman Trophy and numerous records.

== Rule changes ==
- Use of a kicking tee for field goals and extra points is prohibited, repealing a rule put forth in 1948; all such kicks must now be made off the ground.
- Five-yard delay of game penalties will be enforced on home teams when crowd noise is too loud for opponents to hear signals.

== Conference and program changes ==
One team upgraded from Division I-AA and one resumed play after being suspended for two seasons, thus increasing the number of Division I-A teams from 104 to 106.

- Louisiana Tech upgraded from Division I-AA as an independent
- The SMU Mustangs of the Southwest Conference resumed play in the wake of the program's "death penalty".

School	1988 Conference	1989 Conference
Louisiana Tech Bulldogs	I-AA Independent	I-A Independent
SMU	No Program	Southwest

== Regular season ==
=== September ===
For the first time, the AP Poll ranked 25 teams rather than the previous 20. The first poll of the year featured Michigan at No. 1 and defending champion Notre Dame at No. 2, followed by No. 3 Nebraska, No. 4 Miami, and No. 5 USC.

August 31-September 4: No. 1 Michigan, No. 3 Nebraska, and No. 4 Miami were idle. No. 2 Notre Dame defeated Virginia 36–13 in the Kickoff Classic, but No. 5 USC blew a late 13–0 lead and lost 14–13 to No. 22 Illinois. No. 8 Auburn, who was also idle this week, moved up in the next poll: No. 1 Notre Dame, No. 2 Michigan, No. 3 Miami, No. 4 Nebraska, and No. 5 Auburn.

September 9: No. 1 Notre Dame was idle, and No. 2 Michigan still had not begun their season. No. 3 Miami opened with a 51-3 domination of Wisconsin, No. 4 Nebraska beat Northern Illinois 48–17, and No. 5 Auburn shut out Pacific 55–0. The top five remained the same in the next poll.

September 16: For the fifth consecutive year, there was a regular-season game between the AP's top two teams. And for the second year in a row Notre Dame was the winner of that matchup, as the No. 1-ranked Fighting Irish defeated No. 2 Michigan 24-19 thanks to Rocket Ismail's two kickoff returns for touchdowns. Meanwhile, No. 3 Miami beat California 31–3, No. 4 Nebraska won 42–30 over Utah, and No. 5 Auburn defeated Southern Mississippi 24–3. The top five in the next poll were No. 1 Notre Dame, No. 2 Miami, No. 3 Nebraska, No. 4 Auburn, and No. 5 Michigan.

September 23: No. 1 Notre Dame defeated Michigan State 21–13, No. 2 Miami won 38–7 at Missouri, and No. 3 Nebraska shut out Minnesota 48–0. No. 4 Auburn was idle. No. 5 Michigan needed a late touchdown and a buzzer-beating field goal to beat No. 24 UCLA 24–23, and the Wolverines fell out of the top five in the next poll. No. 6 Colorado did not play this weekend, but they met with a tragedy as quarterback Sal Aunese (who was the father of coach Bill McCartney's grandson, T.C.) died of stomach cancer. The Buffaloes moved up in the next poll: No. 1 Notre Dame, No. 2 Miami, No. 3 Nebraska, No. 4 Auburn, and No. 5 Colorado.

September 30: No. 1 Notre Dame beat their third straight Big Ten opponent, winning 40–7 at Purdue. Michigan State had to play a top-two team for the second week in a row, and the Spartans fell 26–20 to No. 2 Miami. No. 3 Nebraska defeated Oregon State 35–7, but No. 4 Auburn lost 21–14 at No. 12 Tennessee. Just days after Aunese's funeral, No. 5 Colorado traveled to Seattle and won 45–28 over No. 21 Washington. No. 6 Michigan beat Maryland 41–21 to move back into the top five: No. 1 Notre Dame, No. 2 Miami, No. 3 Colorado, No. 4 Nebraska, and No. 5 Michigan.

=== October ===
October 7: No. 1 Notre Dame won 27–17 at Stanford, No. 2 Miami overwhelmed Cincinnati 56–0, No. 3 Colorado crushed Missouri 49–3, No. 4 Nebraska dominated Kansas State 58–7, and No. 5 Michigan blanked Wisconsin 24–0. The top five remained the same in the next poll.

October 14: No. 1 Notre Dame visited No. 17 Air Force and won 41–27. Gino Torretta, subbing for the injured Craig Erickson, set a school record with 468 passing yards in No. 2 Miami's 48–16 win over San Jose State. No. 3 Colorado won 52–17 at Iowa State, No. 4 Nebraska beat Missouri 50–7, and No. 5 Michigan squeaked past No. 21 Michigan State 10–7. The top five again remained the same in the next poll.

October 21: No. 1 Notre Dame came back from a 10-point halftime deficit to pull out a 28–24 victory over No. 9 USC. No. 2 Miami was idle. No. 3 Colorado beat Kansas 49–17, No. 4 Nebraska won 48–23 at Oklahoma State, and No. 5 Michigan defeated Iowa 26–12. The top five once again remained the same.

October 28: No. 1 Notre Dame defeated No. 7 Pittsburgh 45–7. No. 2 Miami visited No. 9 Florida State, whom they had defeated 31–0 in 1988, and FSU took revenge with a 24–10 victory. No. 3 Colorado won 20–3 over Oklahoma; the Sooners were entering a down period after a series of off-field scandals and the forced resignation of longtime coach Barry Switzer. No. 4 Nebraska beat Iowa State 49–17, and No. 5 Michigan defeated Indiana 38–10. In a matchup between No. 6 Alabama and No. 14 Penn State, the Nittany Lions had the ball inside the one-yard line with 13 seconds left. Penn State coach Joe Paterno elected to go for a field goal rather than a touchdown, but the kick was blocked and Alabama won the game 17–16. The next poll featured No. 1 Notre Dame, No. 2 Colorado, No. 3 Nebraska, No. 4 Michigan, and No. 5 Alabama.

=== November–December ===
November 4: No. 1 Notre Dame shut out Navy 41–0. No. 2 Colorado made it two wins in two weeks against Big 8 powerhouses, preserving a 27–21 victory over No. 3 Nebraska with a last-second deflection in the end zone. No. 4 Michigan defeated Purdue 42–27, No. 5 Alabama beat Mississippi State 23–10, and No. 6 Florida State won 35–10 over South Carolina. The next poll featured No. 1 Notre Dame, No. 2 Colorado, No. 3 Michigan, No. 4 Alabama, and No. 5 Florida State.

November 11: No. 1 Notre Dame overwhelmed SMU 59–6, one of many blowout losses for the Mustangs in their first year back from an NCAA-imposed "death penalty" (they had allowed a record-setting 1,021 yards of offense in a 95–21 loss to Houston three weeks earlier). No. 2 Colorado won 41–17 at Oklahoma State to clinch the Big 8 title and a spot in the Orange Bowl; this was the first time since 1961 that a team other than Oklahoma or Nebraska had won an outright Big 8 championship. No. 3 Michigan visited No. 8 Illinois for a 24–10 victory, No. 4 Alabama defeated LSU 32–16, and No. 5 Florida State was idle. The top five remained the same in the next poll.

November 18: No. 1 Notre Dame won 34–23 at No. 17 Penn State. No. 2 Colorado finished an undefeated regular season with a 59–11 victory at Kansas State, which finished 1-10 under first-year coach Bill Snyder. No. 3 Michigan beat Minnesota 49–15, No. 4 Alabama defeated Southern Mississippi 37–14, and No. 5 Florida State won 57–20 over Memphis. The Pac-10 race was decided this weekend, as No. 9 USC topped No. 25 Arizona 24–3 to clinch a Rose Bowl berth. The top five again remained the same in the next poll.

November 25: Notre Dame's most famous victory in their 1988 championship season was their upset of then-No. 1 Miami in the “Catholics vs. Convicts” game. This year's rematch had the opposite result, as the No. 7-ranked Hurricanes upset the top-rated Fighting Irish 27–10. No. 2 Colorado had finished their schedule. No. 3 Michigan wrapped up the Big Ten championship and earned a Rose Bowl bid with a 28–18 defeat of No. 20 Ohio State, while No. 4 Alabama and No. 5 Florida State were idle. No. 9 Arkansas held off No. 14 Texas A&M 23–22 to win the SWC title and a spot in the Cotton Bowl. The next poll featured No. 1 Colorado, No. 2 Alabama, No. 3 Michigan, No. 4 Miami, and No. 5 Notre Dame.

December 2: No. 2 Alabama was undefeated going into the last game of the season, but a 30–20 loss to No. 11 Auburn in the Iron Bowl spoiled their perfect record and caused the two rivals to finish in a three-way tie for the SEC title with No. 8 Tennessee. Despite their loss, Alabama was picked to represent the conference in the Sugar Bowl. No. 6 Florida State finished their season with a ninth consecutive win after an 0–2 start, defeating Florida 24–17. The other major teams had already completed their schedules, and the final poll of the regular season featured No. 1 Colorado, No. 2 Miami, No. 3 Michigan, No. 4 Notre Dame, and No. 5 Florida State.

As sometimes happened in the days before the NCAA had a formal process to pick the national champion, the title was affected by an early bowl game selection. Assuming that Notre Dame would defeat Miami and finish the season at the top of the poll, the Orange Bowl organizers set up what they hoped would be a No. 1 vs. No. 2 game between the Fighting Irish and Colorado. When Notre Dame dropped in the polls after their loss, the Orange Bowl ended up being No. 1 vs. No. 4 with other teams still in contention for the championship. Miami, the actual No. 2 team at the end of the season, ended up playing No. 7 Alabama in the Sugar Bowl. The other major matchups were No. 3 Michigan against No. 12 USC in the Rose Bowl, No. 5 Florida State against No. 6 Nebraska in the Fiesta, and No. 8 Tennessee against No. 10 Arkansas in the Cotton.

== Conference standings ==
1989 Atlantic Coast Conference football standings
	Conf.					Overall
Team	W		L		T	W		L		T
No. 18 Virginia +	6	–	1	–	0	10	–	3	–	0
Duke +	6	–	1	–	0	8	–	4	–	0
No. 12 Clemson	5	–	2	–	0	10	–	2	–	0
Georgia Tech	4	–	3	–	0	7	–	4	–	0
NC State	4	–	3	–	0	7	–	5	–	0
Maryland	2	–	5	–	0	3	–	7	–	1
Wake Forest	1	–	6	–	0	2	–	8	–	1
North Carolina	0	–	7	–	0	1	–	10	–	0
+ – Conference co-champions; Rankings from AP Poll

1989 Big Eight Conference football standings
	Conf.					Overall
Team	W		L		T	W		L		T
No. 4 Colorado $	7	–	0	–	0	11	–	1	–	0
No. 11 Nebraska	6	–	1	–	0	10	–	2	–	0
Oklahoma	5	–	2	–	0	7	–	4	–	0
Iowa State	4	–	3	–	0	6	–	5	–	0
Oklahoma State	3	–	4	–	0	4	–	7	–	0
Kansas	2	–	5	–	0	4	–	7	–	0
Missouri	1	–	6	–	0	2	–	9	–	0
Kansas State	0	–	7	–	0	1	–	10	–	0
$ – Conference champion; Rankings from AP Poll

1989 Big Ten Conference football standings
	Conf.					Overall
Team	W		L		T	W		L		T
No. 7 Michigan $	8	–	0	–	0	10	–	2	–	0
No. 10 Illinois	7	–	1	–	0	10	–	2	–	0
No. 16 Michigan State	6	–	2	–	0	8	–	4	–	0
No. 24 Ohio State	6	–	2	–	0	8	–	4	–	0
Minnesota	4	–	4	–	0	6	–	5	–	0
Indiana	3	–	5	–	0	5	–	6	–	0
Iowa	3	–	5	–	0	5	–	6	–	0
Purdue	2	–	6	–	0	3	–	8	–	0
Wisconsin	1	–	7	–	0	2	–	9	–	0
Northwestern	0	–	8	–	0	0	–	11	–	0
$ – Conference champion; Rankings from AP Poll

1989 Big West Conference football standings
	Conf.					Overall
Team	W		L		T	W		L		T
Fresno State $	7	–	0	–	0	11	–	1	–	0
Cal State Fullerton	5	–	2	–	0	6	–	4	–	1
San Jose State	5	–	2	–	0	6	–	5	–	0
Utah State	4	–	3	–	0	4	–	7	–	0
UNLV	3	–	4	–	0	4	–	7	–	0
Long Beach State	2	–	5	–	0	4	–	8	–	0
Pacific (CA)	2	–	5	–	0	2	–	10	–	0
New Mexico State	0	–	7	–	0	0	–	11	–	0
$ – Conference champion

1989 Mid-American Conference football standings
	Conf.					Overall
Team	W		L		T	W		L		T
Ball State $	6	–	1	–	1	7	–	3	–	2
Eastern Michigan	6	–	2	–	0	7	–	3	–	1
Toledo	6	–	2	–	0	6	–	5	–	0
Central Michigan	5	–	2	–	1	5	–	5	–	1
Bowling Green	5	–	3	–	0	5	–	6	–	0
Western Michigan	3	–	5	–	0	5	–	6	–	0
Miami (OH)	2	–	5	–	1	2	–	8	–	1
Ohio	1	–	6	–	1	1	–	9	–	1
Kent State	0	–	8	–	0	0	–	11	–	0
$ – Conference champion

1989 Pacific-10 Conference football standings
	Conf.					Overall
Team	W		L		T	W		L		T
No. 8 USC $	6	–	0	–	1	9	–	2	–	1
No. 23 Washington	5	–	3	–	0	8	–	4	–	0
Oregon	5	–	3	–	0	8	–	4	–	0
No. 25 Arizona	5	–	3	–	0	8	–	4	–	0
Arizona State	3	–	3	–	1	6	–	4	–	1
Oregon State	3	–	4	–	1	4	–	7	–	1
Washington State	3	–	5	–	0	6	–	5	–	0
Stanford	3	–	5	–	0	3	–	8	–	0
UCLA	2	–	5	–	1	3	–	7	–	1
California	2	–	6	–	0	4	–	7	–	0
$ – Conference champion; Rankings from AP Poll

1989 Southeastern Conference football standings
	Conf.					Overall
Team	W		L		T	W		L		T
No. 5 Tennessee +	6	–	1	–	0	11	–	1	–	0
No. 9 Alabama +	6	–	1	–	0	10	–	2	–	0
No. 6 Auburn +	6	–	1	–	0	10	–	2	–	0
Florida	4	–	3	–	0	7	–	5	–	0
Ole Miss	4	–	3	–	0	8	–	4	–	0
Georgia	4	–	3	–	0	6	–	6	–	0
Kentucky	2	–	5	–	0	6	–	5	–	0
LSU	2	–	5	–	0	4	–	7	–	0
Mississippi State	1	–	6	–	0	5	–	6	–	0
Vanderbilt	0	–	7	–	0	1	–	10	–	0
+ – Conference co-champions; Rankings from AP Poll

1989 Southwest Conference football standings
	Conf.					Overall
Team	W		L		T	W		L		T
No. 13 Arkansas $	7	–	1	–	0	10	–	2	–	0
No. 20 Texas A&M	6	–	2	–	0	8	–	4	–	0
No. 14 Houston	6	–	2	–	0	9	–	2	–	0
No. 19 Texas Tech	5	–	3	–	0	9	–	3	–	0
Baylor	4	–	4	–	0	5	–	6	–	0
Texas	4	–	4	–	0	5	–	6	–	0
TCU	2	–	6	–	0	4	–	7	–	0
Rice	2	–	6	–	0	2	–	8	–	1
SMU	0	–	8	–	0	2	–	9	–	0
$ – Conference champion; Rankings from AP Poll

1989 Western Athletic Conference football standings
	Conf.					Overall
Team	W		L		T	W		L		T
No. 22 BYU $	7	–	1	–	0	10	–	3	–	0
Air Force	5	–	1	–	1	8	–	4	–	1
Hawaii	5	–	2	–	1	9	–	3	–	1
Wyoming	5	–	3	–	0	5	–	6	–	0
San Diego State	4	–	3	–	0	6	–	5	–	1
Colorado State	4	–	3	–	0	5	–	5	–	1
Utah	2	–	6	–	0	4	–	8	–	0
UTEP	1	–	7	–	0	2	–	10	–	0
New Mexico	0	–	7	–	0	2	–	10	–	0
$ – Conference champion; Rankings from AP Poll

1989 NCAA Division I-A independents football records
	Conf.			Overall
Team	W	L	T	W		L		T
No. 1 Miami (FL)		–		11	–	1	–	0
No. 2 Notre Dame		–		12	–	1	–	0
No. 3 Florida State		–		10	–	2	–	0
Northern Illinois		–		9	–	2	–	0
No. 15 Penn State		–		8	–	3	–	1
No. 17 Pittsburgh		–		8	–	3	–	1
No. 21 West Virginia		–		8	–	3	–	1
Syracuse		–		8	–	4	–	0
Southwestern Louisiana		–		7	–	4	–	0
Akron		–		6	–	4	–	1
South Carolina		–		6	–	4	–	1
Virginia Tech		–		6	–	4	–	1
Louisiana Tech		–		5	–	4	–	1
Army		–		6	–	5	–	0
Louisville		–		6	–	5	–	0
East Carolina		–		5	–	5	–	1
Tulsa		–		6	–	6	–	0
Southern Miss		–		5	–	6	–	0
Tulane		–		4	–	8	–	0
Navy		–		3	–	8	–	0
Rutgers		–		2	–	7	–	2
Boston College		–		2	–	9	–	0
Memphis State		–		2	–	9	–	0
Cincinnati		–		1	–	9	–	1
Temple		–		1	–	10	–	0
Rankings from AP Poll

== No. 1 and No. 2 progress ==
WEEKS	No. 1	No. 2	Event	
PRE	Michigan	Notre Dame	Notre Dame 36, Virginia 13	Aug 31
1–2	Notre Dame	Michigan	Notre Dame 24, Michigan 19	Sep 16
3–7	Notre Dame	Miami	Florida State 24, Miami 10	Oct 28
8–11	Notre Dame	Colorado	Miami 27, Notre Dame 10	Nov 25
12	Colorado	Alabama	Auburn 30, Alabama 20	Dec 2
13	Colorado	Miami	Notre Dame 21, Colorado 6	Jan 1

== Notable rivalry games ==
- No. 2 Alabama 20 @ No. 11 Auburn 30 – This was the first Iron Bowl game being played in Auburn.

== I-AA team wins over I-A teams ==
Italics denotes I-AA teams.

Date	Visiting team	Home team	Site	Result	Attendance	Ref.
September 9	Appalachian State	Wake Forest	Groves Stadium • Winston-Salem, North Carolina	15–10	30,200	
September 9	Arkansas State	Memphis State	Liberty Bowl Memorial Stadium • Memphis, Tennessee (Paint Bucket Bowl)	17–13	30,794	
September 9	Lamar	UTEP	Sun Bowl • El Paso, Texas	21–19	36,632	
September 16	Northern Iowa	Kansas State	KSU Stadium • Manhattan, Kansas	10–8	28,275	
September 23	No. T–11 (I-AA) The Citadel	Navy	Navy–Marine Corps Memorial Stadium • Annapolis, Maryland	14–10	20,057	
September 23	Akron	Youngstown State	Stambaugh Stadium • Youngstown, Ohio (Steel Tire)	17–20		
October 14	Akron	No. T–20 (I-AA) Eastern Illinois	O'Brien Field • Charleston, Illinois	17–21		
October 14	No. 17 (I-AA) Liberty	Eastern Michigan	Rynearson Stadium • Ypsilanti, Michigan	25–24		
October 21	No. T–15 (I-AA) Youngstown State	Central Michigan	Kelly/Shorts Stadium • Mount Pleasant, Michigan	30–3		
October 28	James Madison	Navy	Navy–Marine Corps Memorial Stadium • Annapolis, Maryland	24–20	30,024	
November 11	Morehead State	Cincinnati	Nippert Stadium • Cincinnati, Ohio	13–10		
November 11	UNLV	Nevada	Mackay Stadium • Reno, Nevada (Battle for Nevada)	7–45	16,545	
November 18	Navy	Delaware	Delaware Stadium • Newark, Delaware	9–10	20,492	
^{#}Rankings from AP Poll released prior to game.

== Bowl games ==
New Year's Day Bowls:

- Orange Bowl: No. 4 Notre Dame 21, No. 1 Colorado 6
- Sugar Bowl: No. 2 Miami (FL) 33, No. 7 Alabama 25
- Rose Bowl: No. 12 USC 17, No. 3 Michigan 10
- Fiesta Bowl: No. 5 Florida State 41, No. 6 Nebraska 17
- Cotton Bowl: No. 8 Tennessee 31, No. 10 Arkansas 27
- Hall of Fame Bowl: No. 9 Auburn 31, No. 21 Ohio State 14
- Florida Citrus Bowl: No. 11 Illinois 31, No. 15 Virginia 21

Other Bowls:

- Gator Bowl: No. 14 Clemson 27, No. 17 West Virginia 7
- John Hancock Bowl: No. 23 Pittsburgh 31, No. 16 Texas A&M 28
- Copper Bowl: Arizona 17, NC State 10
- Holiday Bowl: No. 18 Penn State 50, No. 19 BYU 39
- Freedom Bowl: Washington 34, Florida 7
- Peach Bowl: Syracuse 19, Georgia 18
- All-American Bowl: No. 24 Texas Tech 49, No. 20 Duke 21
- Liberty Bowl: Mississippi 42, Air Force 29
- Aloha Bowl: No. 22 Michigan State 33, No. 25 Hawaii 13
- Independence Bowl: Oregon 27, Tulsa 24
- California Bowl: Fresno State 27, Ball State 6

== Final AP poll ==
1. Miami (FL)
2. Notre Dame
3. Florida State
4. Colorado
5. Tennessee
6. Auburn
7. Michigan
8. Southern California
9. Alabama
10. Illinois
11. Nebraska
12. Clemson
13. Arkansas
14. Houston
15. Penn State
16. Michigan State
17. Pittsburgh
18. Virginia
19. Texas Tech
20. Texas A&M
21. West Virginia
22. BYU
23. Washington
24. Ohio State
25. Arizona

== Final Coaches poll ==
1. Miami (FL)
2. Florida St.
3. Notre Dame
4. Colorado
5. Tennessee
6. Auburn
7. Alabama
8. Michigan
9. Southern California
10. Illinois
11. Clemson
12. Nebraska
13. Arkansas
14. Penn St.
15. Virginia
16. Texas Tech
17. Michigan St.
18. Brigham Young
19. Pittsburgh
20. Washington

== Heisman Trophy voting ==
The Heisman Trophy is given to the year's most outstanding player

Player	School	Position	1st	2nd	3rd	Total
Andre Ware	Houston	QB	242	132	83	1,073
Anthony Thompson	Indiana	RB	185	170	108	1,003
Major Harris	West Virginia	QB	115	115	134	709
Tony Rice	Notre Dame	QB	72	101	105	523
Darian Hagan	Colorado	QB	52	42	52	292
Dee Dowis	Air Force	QB	15	31	38	145
Emmitt Smith	Florida	RB	13	29	43	140
Percy Snow	Michigan State	LB	7	15	19	70
Ty Detmer	BYU	QB	3	13	14	49
Blair Thomas	Penn State	RB	4	12	12	48
Raghib Ismail	Notre Dame	WR	3	11	17	48

== Other major awards ==
- Maxwell (Player): Anthony Thompson, Indiana
- Camp (Back): Anthony Thompson, Indiana
- O'Brien Award (QB): Andre Ware, Houston
- Rockne (Lineman): Chris Zorich, Notre Dame, NT
- Lombardi (Linebacker): Percy Snow, Michigan St.
- Outland (Interior): Mohammed Elewonibi, BYU
- Coach of the Year: Bill McCartney, Colorado

== Attendances ==
Average home attendance top 3:

Rank	Team	Average
1	Michigan Wolverines	105,356
2	Tennessee Volunteers	93,917
3	Ohio State Buckeyes	85,302
