= 1989 Florida State Seminoles football team =

American college football season

1989 Florida State Seminoles football

Fiesta Bowl champion

Fiesta Bowl, W 41–17 vs. Nebraska
- Conference: Independent

Ranking
- Coaches: No. 2
- AP: No. 3
- Record: 10–2
- Head coach: Bobby Bowden (14th season)
- Offensive coordinator: Wayne McDuffie (7th season)
- Offensive scheme: I formation, Pro set
- Defensive coordinator: Mickey Andrews (6th season)
- Base defense: 4–3
- Captains: Peter Tom Willis; LeRoy Butler; Dexter Carter
- Home stadium: Doak Campbell Stadium

1989 NCAA Division I-A independents football records
	Conf.			Overall
Team	W	L	T	W		L		T
No. 1 Miami (FL)		–		11	–	1	–	0
No. 2 Notre Dame		–		12	–	1	–	0
No. 3 Florida State		–		10	–	2	–	0
Northern Illinois		–		9	–	2	–	0
No. 15 Penn State		–		8	–	3	–	1
No. 17 Pittsburgh		–		8	–	3	–	1
No. 21 West Virginia		–		8	–	3	–	1
Syracuse		–		8	–	4	–	0
Southwestern Louisiana		–		7	–	4	–	0
Akron		–		6	–	4	–	1
South Carolina		–		6	–	4	–	1
Virginia Tech		–		6	–	4	–	1
Louisiana Tech		–		5	–	4	–	1
Army		–		6	–	5	–	0
Louisville		–		6	–	5	–	0
East Carolina		–		5	–	5	–	1
Tulsa		–		6	–	6	–	0
Southern Miss		–		5	–	6	–	0
Tulane		–		4	–	8	–	0
Navy		–		3	–	8	–	0
Rutgers		–		2	–	7	–	2
Boston College		–		2	–	9	–	0
Memphis State		–		2	–	9	–	0
Cincinnati		–		1	–	9	–	1
Temple		–		1	–	10	–	0
Rankings from AP Poll

The 1989 Florida State Seminoles football team represented Florida State University as an independent during the 1989 NCAA Division I-A football season. Led by 14th-year head coach Bobby Bowden, the Seminoles compiled a record of 10–2 with win in the Fiesta Bowl over Nebraska. Florida State played home games at Doak Campbell Stadium in Tallahassee, Florida.

== Schedule ==
Date	Time	Opponent	Rank	Site	TV	Result	Attendance	Source
September 2	12:30 p.m.	vs. Southern Miss	No. 6	Gator Bowl Stadium; Jacksonville, FL	TBS	L 26–30	48,746	
September 9	7:30 p.m.	No. 10 Clemson	No. 16	Doak Campbell Stadium; Tallahassee, FL (rivalry)	ESPN	L 23–34	61,897	
September 16	7:30 p.m.	at No. 21 LSU		Tiger Stadium; Baton Rouge, LA	ESPN	W 31–21	75,524	
September 23	7:00 p.m.	Tulane		Doak Campbell Stadium; Tallahassee, FL		W 59–9	61,613	
October 7	1:30 p.m.	at No. 17 Syracuse	No. 22	Carrier Dome; Syracuse, NY		W 41–10	49,832	
October 14	12:00 p.m.	at Virginia Tech	No. 19	Lane Stadium; Blacksburg, VA	SUN	W 41–7	41,832	
October 21	7:30 p.m.	No. 11 Auburn	No. 14	Doak Campbell Stadium; Tallahassee, FL	ESPN	W 22–14	62,711	
October 28	8:00 p.m.	No. 2 Miami (FL)	No. 9	Doak Campbell Stadium; Tallahassee, FL (rivalry)	ESPN	W 24–10	62,602	
November 4	2:00 p.m.	South Carolina^{†}	No. 6	Doak Campbell Stadium; Tallahassee, FL		W 35–10	61,852	
November 18	2:00 p.m.	Memphis State	No. 5	Doak Campbell Stadium; Tallahassee, FL		W 57–20	57,511	
December 2	7:30 p.m.	at Florida	No. 6	Florida Field; Gainesville, FL (rivalry)	ESPN	W 24–17	75,124	
January 1	4:30 p.m.	vs. No. 6 Nebraska	No. 5	Sun Devil Stadium; Tempe, AZ (Fiesta Bowl)	NBC	W 41–17	73,953	
^{†}Homecoming; Rankings from AP Poll released prior to the game; All times are in Eastern time; Source:

== Rankings ==
Ranking movements Legend: ██ Increase in ranking ██ Decrease in ranking — = Not ranked т = Tied with team above or below ( ) = First-place votes
	Week																
Poll	Pre	1	2	3	4	5	6	7	8	9	10	11	12	13	14	15	Final
AP	6 (2)	16	—	—	25	22	19	14	9	6	5	5	5	6	5	5	3 (2)
Coaches	6 (1)	16	—	—	20	20 т	16 т	13	8	5	4	5	5	6	5 (1)		2 (7)

== Game summaries ==
=== Southern Miss ===
Florida State vs. Southern Miss

Team	1	2	3	4	Total
#6 Seminoles	10	0	13	3	26
• Golden Eagles	3	14	0	13	30

- Date: September 2
- Location: Gator Bowl Stadium, Jacksonville, FL
- Game start: 12:30 p.m. EDT
- Game attendance: 48,746
- Television network: TBS

Scoring summary
Q1		FSU	Dexter Carter 11-yard run (Mason kick)	FSU 7–0
Q1		FSU	Bill Mason 24-yard field goal	FSU 10–0
Q1	0:17	USM	Chuck Davis 22-yard field goal	FSU 10–3
Q2		USM	Eddie Ray Jackson 3-yard run (Davis kick)	Tied 10–10
Q2	0:11	USM	Alfred Williams 4-yard pass from Brett Favre (Davis kick)	USM 17–10
Q3		FSU	Lawrence Dawsey 23-yard pass from Peter Tom Willis (Mason kick)	Tied 17–17
Q3		FSU	Dexter Carter 9-yard run (kick failed)	FSU 23–17
Q4		USM	Rickey Bradley 10-yard run (Davis kick)	USM 24–23
Q4	6:57	FSU	Bill Mason 27-yard field goal	FSU 26–24
Q4	0:23	USM	Anthony Harris 2-yard pass from Brett Favre (pass failed)	USM 30–26

=== Clemson ===
Clemson at Florida State

Team	1	2	3	4	Total
• #10 Tigers	7	21	0	6	34
#16 Seminoles	0	10	6	7	23

- Date: September 9
- Location: Doak Campbell Stadium

=== At LSU ===
Florida State at LSU

Team	1	2	3	4	Total
• Seminoles	0	10	7	14	31
#21 Tigers	3	3	8	7	21

- Date: September 16
- Location: Tiger Stadium
- Television network: ESPN

=== Tulane ===
Tulane at Florida State

Team	1	2	3	4	Total
Green Wave	0	0	6	3	9
• Seminoles	17	14	21	7	59

- Date: September 23
- Location: Doak Campbell Stadium

=== At Syracuse ===
Florida State at Syracuse

Team	1	2	3	4	Total
• #22 Seminoles	10	7	17	7	41
#17 Orangemen	0	3	7	0	10

- Date: October 7
- Location: Carrier Dome

=== At Virginia Tech ===
Florida State at Virginia Tech

Team	1	2	3	4	Total
• #19 Seminoles	7	17	10	7	41
Hokies	0	0	0	7	7

- Date: October 14
- Location: Lane Stadium

=== Auburn ===
Auburn at Florida State

Team	1	2	3	4	Total
#11 Tigers	3	0	0	11	14
• #14 Seminoles	3	16	3	0	22

- Date: October 21
- Location: Doak Campbell Stadium

=== Miami (FL) ===
#2 Miami (FL) Hurricanes at #9 Florida State Seminoles

Quarter	1	2	3	4	Total
Miami (FL)	10	0	0	0	10
Florida St	14	0	7	3	24

at Doak Campbell Stadium, Tallahassee, Florida

- Date: October 28, 1989
- Game time: 8:00 p.m. EST
- Game attendance: 62,602
- TV announcers (ESPN): Ron Franklin and Kevin Kiley
- Recap/Box Score

Game information

First quarter

- FSU – Dexter Carter 37-yard run (Richie Andrews kick), 14:37. Florida St 7–0. Drive:
- MIA – Randal Hill 8-yard pass from Gino Torretta (Carlos Huerta kick), 9:57. Tie 7–7. Drive: 80 yards.
- FSU – Edgar Bennett 1-yard run (Richie Andrews kick), 5:11. Florida St 14–7. Drive: 82 yards.
- MIA – Carlos Huerta 44-yard field goal, 1:09. Florida St 14–10. Drive:

Third quarter

- FSU – Amp Lee 1-yard run (Richie Andrews kick), 2:20. Florida St 21–10. Drive:

Fourth quarter

- FSU – Richie Andrews 41-yard field goal, 14:18. 'Florida St 24–10. Drive:

Top passers

- MIA – Gino Torretta – TD, 4 INT
- FSU – Peter Tom Willis – 7/20, 129 yards, INT

Top rushers

- MIA –
- FSU – Dexter Carter – 21 rushes, 142 yards, TD

Top receivers

- MIA –
- FSU – Ronald Lewis – 3 receptions, 77 yards

Prior to the Miami-FSU game, University of Miami mascot Sebastian the Ibis was tackled by a group of police officers for attempting to put out Chief Osceola's flaming spear. Sebastian was wearing a fireman's helmet and yellow raincoat and holding a fire extinguisher. When a police officer attempted to grab the fire extinguisher, the officer was sprayed in the chest. Sebastian was handcuffed by four officers but ultimately released. Miami quarterback Gino Torretta, who started the game in place of injured Craig Erickson, told ESPN, "Even if we weren't bad boys, it added to the mystique that, 'Man, look, even their mascot's getting arrested.'"

=== South Carolina ===
South Carolina at Florida State

Team	1	2	3	4	Total
Gamecocks	0	7	0	3	10
• #6 Seminoles	7	14	14	0	35

- Date: November 4
- Location: Doak Campbell Stadium

=== Memphis State ===
Memphis State at Florida State

Team	1	2	3	4	Total
Tigers	6	7	0	7	20
• #5 Seminoles	17	34	0	6	57

- Date: November 18
- Location: Doak Campbell Stadium

=== At Florida ===
Florida State at Florida

Team	1	2	3	4	Total
• #6 Seminoles	7	3	7	7	24
Gators	3	7	0	7	17

- Date: December 2
- Location: Florida Field
- Game start: 7:30 p.m. EST
- Game attendance: 75,154
- Game weather: 61 °F (16 °C)
- Television network: ESPN

Scoring summary
Q1	3:22	FSU	Anthony 62 yard pass from Willis (Andrews kick)	FSU 7–0
Q1	0:20	FLA	Francis 46 yard field goal	FSU 7–3
Q2	8:21	FLA	Simmons 3 yard run (Francis kick)	FLA 10–7
Q2	2:50	FSU	Andrews 24 yard field goal	Tie 10–10
Q3	8:00	FSU	LaSane 22 yard pass from Willis (Andrews kick)	FSU 17–10
Q4	8:05	FSU	Roberts 10 yard pass from Willis (Andrews kick)	FSU 24–10
Q4	4:08	FLA	E. Smith 2 yard run (Francis kick)	FSU 24–17

- Peter Tom Willis 20/32, 319 Yds
- Terry Anthony 4 Rec, 126 Yds

=== Nebraska—Fiesta Bowl ===
Nebraska vs. Florida State

Team	1	2	3	4	Total
#6 Cornhuskers	7	3	0	7	17
• #5 Seminoles	0	21	20	0	41

- Date: January 1
- Location: Sun Devil Stadium, Tempe, AZ
- Game attendance: 73,953
- Game weather: Clear
- Referee: Jimmy Harper (SEC)
- TV announcers (NBC): Charlie Jones and Merlin Olsen

Scoring summary
Q1	11:19	Neb	Morgan Gregory 9-yard pass from Gerry Gdowski (Barrios kick)	Neb 7–0
Q2		FSU	Terry Anthony 14-yard pass from Peter Tom Willis (Andrews kick)	Tied 7–7
Q2		Neb	Chris Drennan 39-yard field goal	Neb 10–7
Q2		FSU	Reggie Johnson 5-yard pass from Peter Tom Willis (Andrews kick)	FSU 14–10
Q2		FSU	Dexter Carter 10-yard pass from Peter Tom Willis (Andrews kick)	FSU 21–10
Q3		FSU	Paul Moore 1-yard run (kick failed)	FSU 27–10
Q3		FSU	Reggie Johnson 8-yard pass from Peter Tom Willis (Andrews kick)	FSU 34–10
Q3		FSU	Terry Anthony 24-yard pass from Peter Tom Willis (Andrews kick)	FSU 41–10
Q4		Neb	Mickey Joseph 2-yard run (Drennan kick)	FSU 41–17

== Roster ==
1989 Florida State Seminoles football team roster
Players
Coaches
Offense

Pos.	#	Name	Class
WR	8	Terry Anthony	Sr
WR		Shannon Baker	Fr
RB	22	Edgar Bennett	So
OL		John Brown
RB	13	Dexter Carter	Sr
TE		Johnny Clower
WR	29	Lawrence Dawsey	Jr
OL		Hayward Haynes
QB	14	Brad Johnson	So
TE		Reggie Johnson	Jr
WR	88	Bruce LaSane	Sr
RB	42	Amp Lee	Fr
WR	7	Ronald Lewis	Sr
OL		Kevin Mancini
RB		Paul Moore	So
OL		Mike Morris
RB		Chris Parker	Jr
RB		Maurice Pinckney
TE		Dave Roberts	Jr
OL		Robert Stevenson
OL		Michael Tanks
QB, P	17	Charlie Ward	Fr
QB	11	Casey Weldon	So
QB	4	Peter Tom Willis	Sr
OL		Tony Yeomans

Defense

Pos.	#	Name	Class
DB		Bryce Abbott
CB	27	Terrell Buckley	Fr
S	6	LeRoy Butler	Sr
LB	45	Kirk Carruthers	So
DL		Keith Carter
DB		John Davis	Fr
LB		Howard Dinkins
DB		Dedrick Dodge	Sr
DB		Leon Fowler
LB	97	Reggie Freeman	Fr
OLB		Kevin Grant
DL	53	Odell Haggins	Sr
DB		Chris Hall	Fr
DT	78	Eric Hayes	Sr
DB		Errol McCorvey
LB		Anthony Moss
DL		Henry Ostaszewski
DB		Bill Ragans
LB		Kelvin Smith
LB		Shelton Thompson
DB		John Wyche

Special teams

Pos.	#	Name	Class
K	9	Richie Andrews	Jr
KR, DB		Corian Freeman
K	43	Bill Mason	Jr
P		John Wimberly	Fr

Head coach

- Bobby Bowden

Coordinators/assistant coaches

- Chuck Amato (DL)

Legend

- (C) Team captain
- (S) Suspended
- (I) Ineligible
- Injured
- Redshirt
