= 1989 Tulane Green Wave football team =

American college football season

1989 Tulane Green Wave football
- Conference: Independent
- Record: 4–8
- Head coach: Greg Davis (2nd season)
- Home stadium: Louisiana Superdome

1989 NCAA Division I-A independents football records
	Conf.			Overall
Team	W	L	T	W		L		T
No. 1 Miami (FL)		–		11	–	1	–	0
No. 2 Notre Dame		–		12	–	1	–	0
No. 3 Florida State		–		10	–	2	–	0
Northern Illinois		–		9	–	2	–	0
No. 15 Penn State		–		8	–	3	–	1
No. 17 Pittsburgh		–		8	–	3	–	1
No. 21 West Virginia		–		8	–	3	–	1
Syracuse		–		8	–	4	–	0
Southwestern Louisiana		–		7	–	4	–	0
Akron		–		6	–	4	–	1
South Carolina		–		6	–	4	–	1
Virginia Tech		–		6	–	4	–	1
Louisiana Tech		–		5	–	4	–	1
Army		–		6	–	5	–	0
Louisville		–		6	–	5	–	0
East Carolina		–		5	–	5	–	1
Tulsa		–		6	–	6	–	0
Southern Miss		–		5	–	6	–	0
Tulane		–		4	–	8	–	0
Navy		–		3	–	8	–	0
Rutgers		–		2	–	7	–	2
Boston College		–		2	–	9	–	0
Memphis State		–		2	–	9	–	0
Cincinnati		–		1	–	9	–	1
Temple		–		1	–	10	–	0
Rankings from AP Poll

The 1989 Tulane Green Wave football team was an American football team that represented Tulane University during the 1989 NCAA Division I-A football season as an independent. In their second year under head coach Greg Davis, the team compiled a 4–8 record.

== Schedule ==
Date	Opponent	Site	Result	Attendance	Source
September 2	at Hawaiʻi	Aloha Stadium; Halawa, HI	L 26–31	45,667	
September 9	Rice	Louisiana Superdome; New Orleans, LA	W 20–19	29,469	
September 16	Southwestern Louisiana	Louisiana Superdome; New Orleans, LA	W 17–10	28,144	
September 23	at Florida State	Doak Campbell Stadium; Tallahassee, FL	L 9–59	61,613	
September 30	Iowa State	Louisiana Superdome; New Orleans, LA	L 24–25	33,206	
October 7	at Southern Miss	M. M. Roberts Stadium; Hattiesburg, MS (rivalry)	L 21–30	18,891	
October 21	Ole Miss	Louisiana Superdome; New Orleans, LA (rivalry)	L 28–32	39,291	
October 28	at Virginia Tech	Lane Stadium; Blacksburg, VA	L 13–30	26,353	
November 4	Memphis State	Louisiana Superdome; New Orleans, LA	W 38–34	24,861	
November 11	at Mississippi State	Davis Wade Stadium; Starkville, MS	L 7–27	25,106	
November 18	at Vanderbilt	Vanderbilt Stadium; Nashville, TN	W 37–13	30,174	
November 25	LSU	Louisiana Superdome; New Orleans, LA (Battle for the Rag)	L 7–27	41,573	

== Roster ==
1989 Tulane Green Wave football team roster
Players
Coaches
Offense

Pos.	#	Name	Class
OT	65	Andy Abramowicz	Fr
QB	10	Billy Duncan	Fr
C	57	Tim Duncan	Jr
WR	80	Melvin Ferdinand	Jr
WR	14	Jerome McIntosh	Sr
RB	23	Michael Pierce	Sr
C	50	John Young	Jr

Defense

Pos.	#	Name	Class
DB	29	Corey Dowden	Jr
LB	89	Ruffin Hamilton	Fr
LB	55	Kevin Jantschek	So
DE	86	Lonnie Marts	Sr
DB	8	Mitchell Price	Sr
LB	56	Pat Stant	Jr
LB	47	Shane Wiegand	Fr

Special teams

Pos.	#	Name	Class

Head coach

- Greg Davis

Coordinators/assistant coaches

Legend

- (C) Team captain
- (S) Suspended
- (I) Ineligible
- Injured
- Redshirt
