= 1989 Pittsburgh Panthers football team =

American college football season

1989 Pittsburgh Panthers football

John Hancock Bowl champion

John Hancock Bowl, W 31–28 vs. Texas A&M
- Conference: Independent

Ranking
- Coaches: No. 19
- AP: No. 17
- Record: 8–3–1
- Head coach: Mike Gottfried (4th season; regular season); Paul Hackett (interim, bowl game)
- Offensive coordinator: Paul Hackett (1st season)
- Offensive scheme: Multiple pro-style
- Defensive coordinator: Bob Valesente (1st season)
- Base defense: 4–3
- Home stadium: Pitt Stadium

1989 Major eastern college football independents records
	Conf.					Overall
Team	W		L		T	W		L		T
No. 15 Penn State $	6	–	0	–	0	8	–	3	–	1
No. 17 Pittsburgh	4	–	1	–	1	8	–	3	–	1
No. 21 West Virginia	3	–	1	–	1	8	–	3	–	1
Syracuse	3	–	3	–	0	8	–	4	–	0
Temple	1	–	4	–	0	1	–	10	–	0
Rutgers	1	–	5	–	0	2	–	7	–	2
Boston College	1	–	5	–	0	2	–	9	–	0
$ – Lambert Trophy Winner; Rankings from AP Poll

1989 NCAA Division I-A independents football records
	Conf.			Overall
Team	W	L	T	W		L		T
No. 1 Miami (FL)		–		11	–	1	–	0
No. 2 Notre Dame		–		12	–	1	–	0
No. 3 Florida State		–		10	–	2	–	0
Northern Illinois		–		9	–	2	–	0
No. 15 Penn State		–		8	–	3	–	1
No. 17 Pittsburgh		–		8	–	3	–	1
No. 21 West Virginia		–		8	–	3	–	1
Syracuse		–		8	–	4	–	0
Southwestern Louisiana		–		7	–	4	–	0
Akron		–		6	–	4	–	1
South Carolina		–		6	–	4	–	1
Virginia Tech		–		6	–	4	–	1
Louisiana Tech		–		5	–	4	–	1
Army		–		6	–	5	–	0
Louisville		–		6	–	5	–	0
East Carolina		–		5	–	5	–	1
Tulsa		–		6	–	6	–	0
Southern Miss		–		5	–	6	–	0
Tulane		–		4	–	8	–	0
Navy		–		3	–	8	–	0
Rutgers		–		2	–	7	–	2
Boston College		–		2	–	9	–	0
Memphis State		–		2	–	9	–	0
Cincinnati		–		1	–	9	–	1
Temple		–		1	–	10	–	0
Rankings from AP Poll

The 1989 Pittsburgh Panthers football team represented the University of Pittsburgh as an independent during the 1989 NCAA Division I-A football season.

== Schedule ==
Date	Time	Opponent	Rank	Site	TV	Result	Attendance	Source
September 2	7:00 p.m.	Pacific (CA)	No. 23	Pitt Stadium; Pittsburgh, PA		W 38–3	35,421	
September 9	12:00 p.m.	at Boston College	No. 23	Alumni Stadium; Chestnut Hill, MA		W 29–10	31,000	
September 23	7:30 p.m.	No. 10 Syracuse	No. 13	Pitt Stadium; Pittsburgh, PA (rivalry)	ESPN	W 30–23	45,762	
September 30	7:30 p.m.	at No. 9 West Virginia	No. 10	Mountaineer Field; Morgantown, WV (Backyard Brawl)	ESPN	T 31–31	68,938	
October 7	12:00 p.m.	at Temple	No. 8	Veterans Stadium; Philadelphia, PA	JP Sports	W 27–3	24,982	
October 14	12:00 p.m.	Navy^{†}	No. 9	Pitt Stadium; Pittsburgh, PA	JP Sports	W 31–14	50,467	
October 28	5:00 p.m.	at No. 1 Notre Dame	No. 7	Notre Dame Stadium; Notre Dame, IN (rivalry)	ESPN	L 7–45	59,075	
November 11	2:30 p.m.	No. 7 Miami (FL)	No. 14	Pitt Stadium; Pittsburgh, PA	CBS	L 3–24	52,528	
November 18	12:00 p.m.	East Carolina	No. 19	Pitt Stadium; Pittsburgh, PA		W 47–42	21,862	
November 25	2:30 p.m.	No. 22 Penn State	No. 19	Pitt Stadium; Pittsburgh, PA (rivalry)	CBS	L 13–16	57,158	
December 2	7:00 a.m.	vs. Rutgers	No. 24	Lansdowne Road; Dublin, Ireland (Emerald Isle Classic)	ESPN	W 46–29	19,800	
December 30	12:30 p.m.	vs. No. 16 Texas A&M	No. 23	Sun Bowl; El Paso, TX (John Hancock Bowl)	CBS	W 31–28	44,887	
^{†}Homecoming; Rankings from AP Poll released prior to the game; All times are in Eastern time

== Personnel ==
1989 Pittsburgh Panthers football team roster
Players
Coaches
Offense

Pos.	#	Name	Class
OL	69	Dan Anderson	So
OL	73	Bill Cherpak	Sr
OL		Jeff Christy	So
RB	32	Glenn Deveaux	So
OL	72	Chris Goetz	So
WR	19	Brian Jackson	So
RB	26	Derrick Lewis	Fr
OL	62	Roman Matusz	Sr
OL	60	Scott Miller	So
TE	41	Dave Moore	So
RB	22	Ronald Redmon	Jr
RB	27	Curvin Richards	Jr
C	55	Bryan Schoch	Jr
TE	86	Eric Seaman	So
OL	51	Chris Sestilli	Fr
QB	12	Scott Stark	Sr
TE	88	Lionel Sykes	Jr
WR	80	Olanda Truitt	Fr
RB	35	Ricky Turner	So
WR	81	Henry Tuten	Sr
QB	10	Alex Van Pelt	Fr
RB	29	Adam Walker	Sr
RB	40	Jermaine Williams	Fr
WR	2	Reggie Williams	Sr

Defense

Pos.	#	Name	Class
DL	96	Richard Allen	So
DL	74	Jon Baker	Jr
DB	16	Robert Bradley	Sr
LB	58	Curtis Bray	So
DB	23	Dave Coleman	So
DB	31	Dan Crossman	Sr
LB	46	Craig Gob	Jr
DL	90	Mark Gunn	Jr
DL	92	Keith Hamilton	Fr
DB	3	Alonzo Hampton	Sr
DB	24	Doug Hetzler	Jr
LB	48	Ricardo McDonald	So
DB	5	Louis Riddick	Jr
DL	89	Tom Sims	Jr
DL	91	Carnel Smith	Sr
DE	93	Marc Spindler	Jr
DB	45	Barry Threats	Fr
LB	7	Prentiss Wright	Jr

Special teams

Pos.	#	Name	Class
K	27	Ed Frazier	So
P	25	Brian Greenfield	Jr
K	4	Jeff Van Horne	Sr

Head coach

- Mike Gottfried

Coordinators/assistant coaches

- Frank D'Alonzo (DL)
- Paul Hackett (OC/QB)
- Larry Kirksey (RB)
- Tommie Liggins (TE)
- Bill Meyers (OL)
- Buddy Morris (Str + Cond)
- Scott O'Brien (ST)
- Nick Rapone (DB)
- Bud Ratliff (RC)
- Sal Sunseri (LB)
- Bob Valesente (AHC/DC)
- Frank Cignetti Jr. (GA)
- Frank Gansz Jr. (GA)
- Mike McCarthy (GA)
- Thomas McConkey (GA)
- Skip Peete (GA)
- John Stone (GA)

Legend

- (C) Team captain
- (S) Suspended
- (I) Ineligible
- Injured
- Redshirt

== Season summary ==
=== At Notre Dame ===
#7 Pittsburgh Panthers (5–0–1) at #1 Notre Dame Fighting Irish (7–0)

Quarter	1	2	3	4	Total
Pittsburgh	7	0	0	0	7
Notre Dame	2	15	21	7	45

at Notre Dame Stadium, South Bend, Indiana

- Date: October 28, 1989
- Game time: 5:00 p.m.
- Game attendance: 59,075
- TV: ESPN
- Recap/Box

Game information

First quarter

- PITT – Ronald Redmon 8-yard pass from Alex Van Pelt (Ed Frazier kick), 9:32. Pittsburgh 7–0. Drive: 12 plays, 68 yards.
- ND – Safety, Alex Van Pelt downed in end zone, 6:07. Pittsburgh 7–2.

Second quarter

- ND – Rodney Culver 1-yard run (run good), 13:22. Notre Dame 10–7. Drive: 36 yards.
- ND – Pat Terrell 54-yard interception return (Craig Hentrich kick), 3:05. Notre Dame 17–7.

Third quarter

- ND – Ricky Watters 2-yard run (Craig Hentrich kick), 8:15. Notre Dame 24–7.
- ND – Raghib Ismail 50-yard run (Craig Hentrich kick), 4:53. Notre Dame 31–7.
- ND – Rodney Culver 1-yard run (Billy Hackett kick), 0:49. Notre Dame 38–7.

Fourth quarter

- ND – Steve Belles 13-yard run (Billy Hackett kick), 4:12. Notre Dame 45–7.

Top passers

- PITT – Alex Van Pelt – 16/33, 170 yards
- ND – Tony Rice – 1/7, 29 yards

Top rushers

- PITT – Curvin Richards – 15 rushes, 47 yards
- ND – Raghib Ismail – 18 rushes, 74 yards, TD

Top receivers

- PITT – Lionel Sykes – 6 receptions, 65 yards
- ND – Raghib Ismail – 1 reception, 29 yards

=== Miami (FL) ===
#7 Miami (FL) at #14 Pittsburgh

Team	1	2	3	4	Total
• Hurricanes	10	3	9	2	24
Panthers	0	0	0	3	3

- Date: November 11
- Location: Pitt Stadium, Pittsburgh, Pennsylvania
- Game attendance: 52,528
- Game weather: 49 °F (9 °C), Light rain, Wind SSW 14 mph (23 km/h)
- TV announcers (CBS): Jim Nantz, Pat Haden, John Dockery

Scoring summary
1	10:38	MIA	Huerta 20-yard field goal	MIA 3–0
1		MIA	McGuire 8-yard run (Huerta kick)	MIA 10–0
2		MIA	Huerta 27-yard field goal	MIA 13–0
3		MIA	Huerta 27-yard field goal	MIA 16–0
3		MIA	Dawkins 9-yard pass from Erickson (pass failed)	MIA 22–0
4	12:06	PITT	Frazier 29-yard field goal	MIA 22–3
4	10:19	MIA	Safety, Van Pelt tackled in end zone	MIA 24–3

== Team players drafted into the NFL ==
Player	Position	Round	Pick	NFL club
Marc Spindler	Defensive end	3	62	Detroit Lions
Dean Caliguire	Guard	4	92	San Francisco 49ers
Alonzo Hampton	Defensive back	4	104	Minnesota Vikings
Tom Sims	Defensive tackle	6	152	Kansas City Chiefs
Chris Goetz	Guard	9	227	San Diego Chargers
Carnel Smith	Defensive end	11	290	Indianapolis Colts
Roman Matusz	Tackle	11	298	Chicago Bears
