= 1989 Tulsa Golden Hurricane football team =

American college football season

1989 Tulsa Golden Hurricane football

Independence Bowl, L 24–27 vs. Oregon
- Conference: Independent
- Record: 6–6
- Head coach: David Rader (2nd season)
- Home stadium: Skelly Stadium

1989 NCAA Division I-A independents football records
	Conf.			Overall
Team	W	L	T	W		L		T
No. 1 Miami (FL)		–		11	–	1	–	0
No. 2 Notre Dame		–		12	–	1	–	0
No. 3 Florida State		–		10	–	2	–	0
Northern Illinois		–		9	–	2	–	0
No. 15 Penn State		–		8	–	3	–	1
No. 17 Pittsburgh		–		8	–	3	–	1
No. 21 West Virginia		–		8	–	3	–	1
Syracuse		–		8	–	4	–	0
Southwestern Louisiana		–		7	–	4	–	0
Akron		–		6	–	4	–	1
South Carolina		–		6	–	4	–	1
Virginia Tech		–		6	–	4	–	1
Louisiana Tech		–		5	–	4	–	1
Army		–		6	–	5	–	0
Louisville		–		6	–	5	–	0
East Carolina		–		5	–	5	–	1
Tulsa		–		6	–	6	–	0
Southern Miss		–		5	–	6	–	0
Tulane		–		4	–	8	–	0
Navy		–		3	–	8	–	0
Rutgers		–		2	–	7	–	2
Boston College		–		2	–	9	–	0
Memphis State		–		2	–	9	–	0
Cincinnati		–		1	–	9	–	1
Temple		–		1	–	10	–	0
Rankings from AP Poll

The 1989 Tulsa Golden Hurricane football team represented the University of Tulsa as an independent during the 1989 NCAA Division I-A football season. In their second year under head coach David Rader, the Golden Hurricane compiled a 6–6 record. Tulsa was invited to the Independence Bowl, where the Golden Hurricane lost to Oregon. The team's statistical leaders included quarterback T. J. Rubley with 2,292 passing yards, Brett Adams with 1,071 rushing yards, and Dan Bitson with 1,425 receiving yards.

== Schedule ==
Date	Opponent	Site	Result	Attendance	Source
September 2	at UTEP	Sun Bowl; El Paso, TX	W 23–14	38,065	
September 9	Oklahoma State	Skelly Stadium; Tulsa, OK (rivalry)	W 20–10	40,785	
September 16	at No. 9 Arkansas	Razorback Stadium; Fayetteville, AR	L 7–26	51,518	
September 23	New Mexico	Skelly Stadium; Tulsa, OK	W 35–33	19,382	
September 30	at Iowa	Kinnick Stadium; Iowa City, IA	L 22–30	67,700	
October 7	at Southwestern Louisiana	Cajun Field; Lafayette, LA	L 13–21	20,263	
October 14	New Mexico State^{†}	Skelly Stadium; Tulsa, OK	W 31–24	21,134	
October 21	Louisville	Skelly Stadium; Tulsa, OK	W 31–24	20,012	
October 28	at Louisiana Tech	Joe Aillet Stadium; Ruston, LA	L 31–34	17,100	
November 11	at Wake Forest	Groves Stadium; Winston–Salem, NC	L 17–29	27,100	
November 18	Bowling Green	Skelly Stadium; Tulsa, OK	W 45–10	25,629	
December 16	vs. Oregon*	Independence Stadium; Shreveport, LA (Independence Bowl)	L 24–27	30,333	
*Non-conference game; ^{†}Homecoming; Rankings from AP Poll released prior to the game

== Roster ==
1989 Tulsa Golden Hurricane football team roster
Players			Coaches
Offense: Pos. / # / Name / Class; QB / 11 / T. J. Rubley / So	Defense: Pos. / # / Name / Class; LB / 58 / Matt Luke / Sr	Special teams: Pos. / # / Name / Class	Head coach: David Rader; Coordinators/assistant coaches Legend: (C) Team captain; (S) Suspended; (I) Ineligible; Injured; Redshirt
