= 1989 Temple Owls football team =

American college football season

1989 Temple Owls football
- Conference: Independent
- Record: 1–10
- Head coach: Jerry Berndt (1st season)
- Home stadium: Veterans Stadium

1989 Major eastern college football independents records
	Conf.					Overall
Team	W		L		T	W		L		T
No. 15 Penn State $	6	–	0	–	0	8	–	3	–	1
No. 17 Pittsburgh	4	–	1	–	1	8	–	3	–	1
No. 21 West Virginia	3	–	1	–	1	8	–	3	–	1
Syracuse	3	–	3	–	0	8	–	4	–	0
Temple	1	–	4	–	0	1	–	10	–	0
Rutgers	1	–	5	–	0	2	–	7	–	2
Boston College	1	–	5	–	0	2	–	9	–	0
$ – Lambert Trophy Winner; Rankings from AP Poll

1989 NCAA Division I-A independents football records
	Conf.			Overall
Team	W	L	T	W		L		T
No. 1 Miami (FL)		–		11	–	1	–	0
No. 2 Notre Dame		–		12	–	1	–	0
No. 3 Florida State		–		10	–	2	–	0
Northern Illinois		–		9	–	2	–	0
No. 15 Penn State		–		8	–	3	–	1
No. 17 Pittsburgh		–		8	–	3	–	1
No. 21 West Virginia		–		8	–	3	–	1
Syracuse		–		8	–	4	–	0
Southwestern Louisiana		–		7	–	4	–	0
Akron		–		6	–	4	–	1
South Carolina		–		6	–	4	–	1
Virginia Tech		–		6	–	4	–	1
Louisiana Tech		–		5	–	4	–	1
Army		–		6	–	5	–	0
Louisville		–		6	–	5	–	0
East Carolina		–		5	–	5	–	1
Tulsa		–		6	–	6	–	0
Southern Miss		–		5	–	6	–	0
Tulane		–		4	–	8	–	0
Navy		–		3	–	8	–	0
Rutgers		–		2	–	7	–	2
Boston College		–		2	–	9	–	0
Memphis State		–		2	–	9	–	0
Cincinnati		–		1	–	9	–	1
Temple		–		1	–	10	–	0
Rankings from AP Poll

The 1989 Temple Owls football team was an American football team that represented Temple University as an independent during the 1989 NCAA Division I-A football season. In its first season under head coach Jerry Berndt, the team compiled a 1–10 record and was outscored by a total of 387 to 141. The team played its home games at Veterans Stadium in Philadelphia.

The team's statistical leaders included Victor Lay with 684 passing yards, Ventres Stevenson with 841 rushing yards, Rick Drayton with 383 receiving yards, and placekicker Bob Wright with 43 points scored.

== Schedule ==
Date	Opponent	Site	Result	Attendance	Source
September 2	at Western Michigan	Waldo Stadium; Kalamazoo, MI	L 24–31	16,357	
September 9	No. 14 Syracuse	Veterans Stadium; Philadelphia, PA	L 3–43	20,150	
September 16	at Penn State	Beaver Stadium; University Park, PA	L 3–42	78,000	
September 23	at Virginia Tech	Lane Stadium; Blacksburg, VA	L 0–23	32,157	
September 30	at No. 14 Houston	Houston Astrodome; Houston, TX	L 7–65	15,121	
October 7	No. 8 Pittsburgh^{†}	Veterans Stadium; Philadelphia, PA	L 3–27	24,982	
October 14	at Boston College	Alumni Stadium; Chestnut Hill, MA	L 14–35	31,000	
October 28	Northern Illinois	Veterans Stadium; Philadelphia, PA	L 17–20	15,712	
November 4	at Georgia	Sanford Stadium; Athens, GA	L 10–37	80,011	
November 11	at East Carolina	Ficklen Memorial Stadium; Greenville, NC	L 24–31	21,862	
November 18	Rutgers	Veterans Stadium; Philadelphia, PA	W 36–33	17,526	
^{†}Homecoming; Rankings from AP Poll released prior to the game
