= 1989 Cincinnati Bearcats football team =

American college football season

1989 Cincinnati Bearcats football
- Conference: Independent
- Record: 1–9–1
- Head coach: Tim Murphy (1st season)
- Defensive coordinator: John Lovett (1st season)
- Home stadium: Nippert Stadium

1989 NCAA Division I-A independents football records
	Conf.			Overall
Team	W	L	T	W		L		T
No. 1 Miami (FL)		–		11	–	1	–	0
No. 2 Notre Dame		–		12	–	1	–	0
No. 3 Florida State		–		10	–	2	–	0
Northern Illinois		–		9	–	2	–	0
No. 15 Penn State		–		8	–	3	–	1
No. 17 Pittsburgh		–		8	–	3	–	1
No. 21 West Virginia		–		8	–	3	–	1
Syracuse		–		8	–	4	–	0
Southwestern Louisiana		–		7	–	4	–	0
Akron		–		6	–	4	–	1
South Carolina		–		6	–	4	–	1
Virginia Tech		–		6	–	4	–	1
Louisiana Tech		–		5	–	4	–	1
Army		–		6	–	5	–	0
Louisville		–		6	–	5	–	0
East Carolina		–		5	–	5	–	1
Tulsa		–		6	–	6	–	0
Southern Miss		–		5	–	6	–	0
Tulane		–		4	–	8	–	0
Navy		–		3	–	8	–	0
Rutgers		–		2	–	7	–	2
Boston College		–		2	–	9	–	0
Memphis State		–		2	–	9	–	0
Cincinnati		–		1	–	9	–	1
Temple		–		1	–	10	–	0
Rankings from AP Poll

The 1989 Cincinnati Bearcats football team represented the University of Cincinnati during the 1989 NCAA Division I-A football season. The Bearcats, led by first-year head coach Tim Murphy, participated as independent and played their home games at Nippert Stadium.

== Schedule ==
Date	Opponent	Site	Result	Attendance	Source
September 2	Rutgers	Nippert Stadium; Cincinnati, OH	T 17–17	10,091	
September 16	East Carolina	Nippert Stadium; Cincinnati, OH	L 14–21	18,153	
September 23	at Miami (OH)	Yager Stadium; Oxford, OH (Victory Bell)	W 30–14	19,447	
September 30	at Louisville	Cardinal Stadium; Louisville, KY (rivalry)	L 17–37	36,305	
October 7	at No. 2 Miami (FL)	Miami Orange Bowl; Miami, FL	L 0–56	48,597	
October 14	Memphis State	Nippert Stadium; Cincinnati, OH (rivalry)	L 17–34	18,632	
October 21	at No. 18 West Virginia	Mountaineer Field; Morgantown, WV	L 3–69	47,176	
October 28	at Akron	Rubber Bowl; Akron, OH	L 0–31	7,747	
November 4	at Kentucky	Commonwealth Stadium; Lexington, KY	L 0–31	46,195	
November 11	Morehead State	Nippert Stadium; Cincinnati, OH	L 10–13		
November 18	Northern Illinois	Nippert Stadium; Cincinnati, OH	L 3–56	4,610	
Rankings from AP Poll released prior to the game

== Roster ==
1989 Cincinnati Bearcats football team roster
Players
Coaches
Offense

Pos.	#	Name	Class
G	61	Bevan Brandt	Fr
QB	14	Don Hoog	So
FB	41	Doug Hoog	So
QB	16	Carl Johnson	Sr
TE	84	Chris Kohl	Jr
G	75	John O'Quinn	So
WR	82	Russ Zelei	Jr

Defense

Pos.	#	Name	Class
S	5	Mavin Bowman	Sr
LB	55	Jack Bruscianelli	Sr
CB	2	Jackie Cooper	Sr
LB	54	Mick Schell	Jr
DT	93	John Thornton	Jr
LB	7	Ron Traut	Sr
LB	42	Doug Zieleniewski	So

Special teams

Pos.	#	Name	Class
P	4	Jeff Jones	Jr

Head coach

- Tim Murphy

Coordinators/assistant coaches

Legend

- (C) Team captain
- (S) Suspended
- (I) Ineligible
- Injured
- Redshirt
