= Bob Weissenfels =

American bobsledder (born 1968)

Personal information
- Born: April 21, 1968 (age 58) Richland, Washington, United States

Sport
- Sport: Bobsleigh

Bob Weissenfels (born April 21, 1968) is an American former bobsledder and college football player. He competed in the four man event at the 1992 Winter Olympics. Weissenfel attended the United States Naval Academy, where he played football and completed in track and field. Playing as a free safety, he led the Navy Midshipmen football team in tackles in 1988 and 1989. He was co-captain of the 1989 Navy Midshipmen football team. In track and field he competed in the decathlon.
