= 1989 Rutgers Scarlet Knights football team =

American college football season

1989 Rutgers Scarlet Knights football
- Conference: Independent
- Record: 2–7–2
- Head coach: Dick Anderson (6th season)
- Offensive coordinator: Dick Curl (7th season)
- Defensive coordinator: Otto Kneidinger (6th season)
- Home stadium: Rutgers Stadium; Giants Stadium

1989 Major eastern college football independents records
	Conf.					Overall
Team	W		L		T	W		L		T
No. 15 Penn State $	6	–	0	–	0	8	–	3	–	1
No. 17 Pittsburgh	4	–	1	–	1	8	–	3	–	1
No. 21 West Virginia	3	–	1	–	1	8	–	3	–	1
Syracuse	3	–	3	–	0	8	–	4	–	0
Temple	1	–	4	–	0	1	–	10	–	0
Rutgers	1	–	5	–	0	2	–	7	–	2
Boston College	1	–	5	–	0	2	–	9	–	0
$ – Lambert Trophy Winner; Rankings from AP Poll

1989 NCAA Division I-A independents football records
	Conf.			Overall
Team	W	L	T	W		L		T
No. 1 Miami (FL)		–		11	–	1	–	0
No. 2 Notre Dame		–		12	–	1	–	0
No. 3 Florida State		–		10	–	2	–	0
Northern Illinois		–		9	–	2	–	0
No. 15 Penn State		–		8	–	3	–	1
No. 17 Pittsburgh		–		8	–	3	–	1
No. 21 West Virginia		–		8	–	3	–	1
Syracuse		–		8	–	4	–	0
Southwestern Louisiana		–		7	–	4	–	0
Akron		–		6	–	4	–	1
South Carolina		–		6	–	4	–	1
Virginia Tech		–		6	–	4	–	1
Louisiana Tech		–		5	–	4	–	1
Army		–		6	–	5	–	0
Louisville		–		6	–	5	–	0
East Carolina		–		5	–	5	–	1
Tulsa		–		6	–	6	–	0
Southern Miss		–		5	–	6	–	0
Tulane		–		4	–	8	–	0
Navy		–		3	–	8	–	0
Rutgers		–		2	–	7	–	2
Boston College		–		2	–	9	–	0
Memphis State		–		2	–	9	–	0
Cincinnati		–		1	–	9	–	1
Temple		–		1	–	10	–	0
Rankings from AP Poll

The 1989 Rutgers Scarlet Knights football team represented Rutgers University as an independent during the 1989 NCAA Division I-A football season. In their sixth and final season under head coach Dick Anderson, the Scarlet Knights compiled a 2–7–2 record while competing as an independent and were outscored by their opponents 319 to 245. The team won victories over Boston College (9-7) and Northwestern (38-27). The team's statistical leaders included Scott Erney with 2,536 passing yards, James Cann with 429 rushing yards, and Randy Jackson with 599 receiving yards.

== Schedule ==
Date	Opponent	Site	Result	Attendance	Source
September 2	at Cincinnati	Nippert Stadium; Cincinnati, OH	T 17–17	10,091	
September 9	Ball State	Rutgers Stadium; Piscataway, NJ	T 31–31	17,143	
September 16	Boston College	Rutgers Stadium; Piscataway, NJ	W 9–7	17,105	
September 23	at Northwestern	Dyche Stadium; Evanston, IL	W 38–27	24,312	
October 7	Penn State	Giants Stadium; East Rutherford, NJ	L 0–17	52,688	
October 14	at Kentucky	Commonwealth Stadium; Lexington, KY	L 26–33	54,771	
October 21	Syracuse	Rutgers Stadium; Piscataway, NJ	L 28–49	29,276	
October 28	at Army	Michie Stadium; West Point, NY	L 14–35	40,701	
November 11	at No. 19 West Virginia	Mountaineer Field; Morgantown, WV	L 20–21	61,336	
November 18	at Temple	Veterans Stadium; Philadelphia, PA	L 33–36	17,526	
December 2	vs. No. 24 Pittsburgh	Lansdowne Road; Dublin, Ireland (Emerald Isle Classic)	L 29–46	19,800	
Rankings from AP Poll released prior to the game

== Roster ==
1989 Rutgers Scarlet Knights football team roster
Players
Coaches
Offense

Pos.	#	Name	Class
C	51	Jeff Erickson	Sr
QB	7	Scott Erney	Sr

Defense

Pos.	#	Name	Class
DT	70	Ron Dau	So
DB	9	Eric Deering	Sr
LB	93	Elnardo Webster	Jr

Special teams

Pos.	#	Name	Class

Head coach

- Dick Anderson

Coordinators/assistant coaches

Legend

- (C) Team captain
- (S) Suspended
- (I) Ineligible
- Injured
- Redshirt
