= 1989 Louisville Cardinals football team =

American college football season

1989 Louisville Cardinals football
- Conference: Independent
- Record: 6–5
- Head coach: Howard Schnellenberger (5th season)
- Offensive coordinator: Gary Nord (1st season)
- Defensive coordinator: Rick Lantz (4th season)
- Home stadium: Cardinal Stadium

1989 NCAA Division I-A independents football records
	Conf.			Overall
Team	W	L	T	W		L		T
No. 1 Miami (FL)		–		11	–	1	–	0
No. 2 Notre Dame		–		12	–	1	–	0
No. 3 Florida State		–		10	–	2	–	0
Northern Illinois		–		9	–	2	–	0
No. 15 Penn State		–		8	–	3	–	1
No. 17 Pittsburgh		–		8	–	3	–	1
No. 21 West Virginia		–		8	–	3	–	1
Syracuse		–		8	–	4	–	0
Southwestern Louisiana		–		7	–	4	–	0
Akron		–		6	–	4	–	1
South Carolina		–		6	–	4	–	1
Virginia Tech		–		6	–	4	–	1
Louisiana Tech		–		5	–	4	–	1
Army		–		6	–	5	–	0
Louisville		–		6	–	5	–	0
East Carolina		–		5	–	5	–	1
Tulsa		–		6	–	6	–	0
Southern Miss		–		5	–	6	–	0
Tulane		–		4	–	8	–	0
Navy		–		3	–	8	–	0
Rutgers		–		2	–	7	–	2
Boston College		–		2	–	9	–	0
Memphis State		–		2	–	9	–	0
Cincinnati		–		1	–	9	–	1
Temple		–		1	–	10	–	0
Rankings from AP Poll

The 1989 Louisville Cardinals football team represented the University of Louisville in the 1989 NCAA Division I-A football season. The Cardinals, led by fifth-year head coach Howard Schnellenberger, participated as independents and played their home games at Cardinal Stadium.

== Schedule ==
Date	Opponent	Site	Result	Attendance	Source
September 2	at Wyoming	War Memorial Stadium; Laramie, WY	W 28–21	26,132	
September 9	at Kansas	Memorial Stadium; Lawrence, KS	W 33–28	32,700	
September 23	No. 9 West Virginia	Cardinal Stadium; Louisville, KY	L 21–30	39,132	
September 30	Cincinnati	Cardinal Stadium; Louisville, KY (rivalry)	W 37–17	36,305	
October 14	Southern Miss^{†}	Cardinal Stadium; Louisville, KY	L 10–16	38,484	
October 21	at Tulsa	Skelly Stadium; Tulsa, OK	L 24–31	20,012	
October 28	at Virginia	Scott Stadium; Charlottesville, VA	L 15–16	33,400	
November 4	No. 15 (I-AA) Western Kentucky	Cardinal Stadium; Louisville, KY	W 55–7	36,126	
November 11	at Memphis State	Liberty Bowl Memorial Stadium; Memphis, TN (rivalry)	W 40–10	14,003	
November 18	at Boston College	Alumni Stadium; Chestnut Hill, MA	W 36–22	24,650	
December 4	vs. Syracuse	Tokyo Dome; Tokyo, Japan (Coca-Cola Classic)	L 13–24	50,000	
^{†}Homecoming; Rankings from AP Poll released prior to the game
