= 1989 Boston College Eagles football team =

American college football season

1989 Boston College Eagles football
- Conference: Independent
- Record: 2–9
- Head coach: Jack Bicknell (9th season)
- Defensive coordinator: Seymour "Red" Kelin (9th season)
- Captains: Rico Labbe; Mark Kamphaus
- Home stadium: Alumni Stadium

1989 Major eastern college football independents records
	Conf.					Overall
Team	W		L		T	W		L		T
No. 15 Penn State $	6	–	0	–	0	8	–	3	–	1
No. 17 Pittsburgh	4	–	1	–	1	8	–	3	–	1
No. 21 West Virginia	3	–	1	–	1	8	–	3	–	1
Syracuse	3	–	3	–	0	8	–	4	–	0
Temple	1	–	4	–	0	1	–	10	–	0
Rutgers	1	–	5	–	0	2	–	7	–	2
Boston College	1	–	5	–	0	2	–	9	–	0
$ – Lambert Trophy Winner; Rankings from AP Poll

1989 NCAA Division I-A independents football records
	Conf.			Overall
Team	W	L	T	W		L		T
No. 1 Miami (FL)		–		11	–	1	–	0
No. 2 Notre Dame		–		12	–	1	–	0
No. 3 Florida State		–		10	–	2	–	0
Northern Illinois		–		9	–	2	–	0
No. 15 Penn State		–		8	–	3	–	1
No. 17 Pittsburgh		–		8	–	3	–	1
No. 21 West Virginia		–		8	–	3	–	1
Syracuse		–		8	–	4	–	0
Southwestern Louisiana		–		7	–	4	–	0
Akron		–		6	–	4	–	1
South Carolina		–		6	–	4	–	1
Virginia Tech		–		6	–	4	–	1
Louisiana Tech		–		5	–	4	–	1
Army		–		6	–	5	–	0
Louisville		–		6	–	5	–	0
East Carolina		–		5	–	5	–	1
Tulsa		–		6	–	6	–	0
Southern Miss		–		5	–	6	–	0
Tulane		–		4	–	8	–	0
Navy		–		3	–	8	–	0
Rutgers		–		2	–	7	–	2
Boston College		–		2	–	9	–	0
Memphis State		–		2	–	9	–	0
Cincinnati		–		1	–	9	–	1
Temple		–		1	–	10	–	0
Rankings from AP Poll

The 1989 Boston College Eagles football team represented Boston College as an independent during the 1989 NCAA Division I-A football season. The Eagles were led by ninth-year head coach Jack Bicknell, and played their home games at Alumni Stadium in Chestnut Hill, Massachusetts. Their 2–9 final record represented the fourth consecutive year of declining results for the Eagles, and their worst record in 11 years.

== Schedule ==
Date	Opponent	Site	Result	Attendance	Source
September 9	No. 23 Pittsburgh	Alumni Stadium; Chestnut Hill, MA	L 10–29	31,000	
September 16	at Rutgers	Rutgers Stadium; Piscataway, NJ	L 7–9	17,105	
September 23	at Penn State	Beaver Stadium; University Park, PA	L 3–7	85,651	
September 30	at Ohio State	Ohio Stadium; Columbus, OH	L 29–34	88,936	
October 14	Temple	Alumni Stadium; Chestnut Hill, MA	W 35–14	31,000	
October 21	Navy	Alumni Stadium; Chestnut Hill, MA	L 24–27	32,000	
October 28	No. 15 West Virginia	Alumni Stadium; Chestnut Hill, MA	L 30–44	32,000	
November 4	at Syracuse	Carrier Dome; Syracuse, NY	L 11–23	49,781	
November 11	at Army	Michie Stadium; West Point, NY	W 24–17	41,105	
November 18	Louisville	Alumni Stadium; Chestnut Hill, MA	L 22–36	24,650	
November 25	at Georgia Tech	Bobby Dodd Stadium; Atlanta, GA	L 12–13	28,221	
Rankings from AP Poll released prior to the game

== Game summaries ==
=== At Ohio State ===
Boston College Eagles (0–3) at Ohio State Buckeyes (1–1)

Quarter	1	2	3	4	Total
Boston College	0	7	16	6	29
Ohio St	10	21	3	0	34

at Ohio Stadium, Columbus, Ohio

- Date: September 30
- Game time: 1:30 p.m.
- Game weather: Sunny, 70 °F (21 °C)
- Game attendance: 88,936
- Referee: Jerry Hendrickson
- Box Score

Game information

First quarter

- OSU – Jeff Graham 80-yard pass from Greg Frey (Pat O'Morrow kick), 13:12. Ohio St 7–0. Drive: 1 play, 80 yards, 0:12.
- OSU – Pat O'Morrow 29-yard field goal, 0:49. Ohio St 10–0. Drive: 8 plays, 37 yards, 3:31.

Second quarter

- OSU – Carlos Snow 24-yard run (Pat O'Morrow kick), 10:51. Ohio St 17–0. Drive: 9 plays, 72 yards, 3:26.
- OSU – Carlos Snow 16-yard run (Pat O'Morrow kick), 2:09. Ohio St 24–0. Drive: 10 plays, 78 yards, 3:59.
- BC – Marcus Cherry 41-yard pass from Mark Kamphaus (Brian Lowe kick), 1:38. Ohio St 24–7. Drive: 2 plays, 60 yards, 0:24.
- OSU – Scottie Graham 70-yard run (Pat O'Morrow kick), 1:09. Ohio St 31–7. Drive: 3 plays, 75 yards, 0:23.

Third quarter

- BC – Mark Chmura 2-yard pass from Willie Hicks (run good), 10:51. Ohio St 31–15. Drive: 5 plays, 69 yards, 2:00.
- BC – Tim Frager 28-yard run (pass good), 5:49. Ohio St 31–23, Drive: 6 plays, 69 yards, 2:48.
- OSU – Pat O'Morrow 35-yard field goal, 1:33. Ohio St 34–23. Drive: 9 plays, 53 yards, 4:14.

Fourth quarter

- BC – Ed Toner 1-yard run (pass failed), 5:33. Ohio St 34–29. Drive: 5 plays, 68 yards, 1:58.

Top passers

- BC – Willie Hicks – 9/12, 184 yards, TD
- OSU – Greg Frey – 15/26, 252 yards, TD

Top rushers

- BC – Mike Sanders – 12 rushes, 63 yards
- OSU – Scottie Graham – 19 rushes, 151 yards, TD

Top receivers

- BC – Marcus Cherry – 4 receptions, 161 yards, TD
- OSU – Jeff Graham – 2 receptions, 101 yards, TD

== Personnel ==
1989 Boston College Eagles football team roster
Players
Coaches
Offense

Pos.	#	Name	Class
OL		Mark Anken
TE		Bob Bicknell
OL		Mike Bumphus
WR		Marcus Cherry
TE	89	Mark Chmura	So
WR		Jim Deines
RB		Tim Frager
QB	8	Willie Hicks	Jr
WR		Ray Hilvert
OT	72	Mike Jovanovich	Jr
QB	12	Mark Kamphaus	Sr
RB	49	Kevin Lyles	Jr
QB	10	Mike Power	Sr
RB		Mike Sanders
G	60	Bill Scavone
C	61	Brian Schoenle
WR	1	Kenrick Skeritt
RB	35	Ed Toner	Jr

Defense

Pos.	#	Name	Class
DB	38	Jeff Baker	Sr
DL		Jim Biestek
LB	88	Ivan Caesar	Jr
DB		Ed Duran
DL	59	Chris Gildea	Sr
DT	96	Peter Gray	Sr
S	44	David Johnson	Jr
LB	92	Matt Kelley	Jr
SS	4	Rico Labbe	Sr
LB		Kevin Pearson
LB		Ron Perryman	Sr

Special teams

Pos.	#	Name	Class
K, P	6	Brian Lowe	Sr

Head coach

- Jack Bicknell

Coordinators/assistant coaches

Legend

- (C) Team captain
- (S) Suspended
- (I) Ineligible
- Injured
- Redshirt

Roster
Last update: 2022-Oct-20
