= 1989 East Carolina Pirates football team =

American college football season

1989 East Carolina Pirates football
- Conference: Independent
- Record: 5–5–1
- Head coach: Bill Lewis (1st season)
- Offensive coordinator: Mark Richt (1st season)
- Offensive scheme: Pro-style
- Base defense: 4–2–5
- Home stadium: Ficklen Memorial Stadium

1989 NCAA Division I-A independents football records
	Conf.			Overall
Team	W	L	T	W		L		T
No. 1 Miami (FL)		–		11	–	1	–	0
No. 2 Notre Dame		–		12	–	1	–	0
No. 3 Florida State		–		10	–	2	–	0
Northern Illinois		–		9	–	2	–	0
No. 15 Penn State		–		8	–	3	–	1
No. 17 Pittsburgh		–		8	–	3	–	1
No. 21 West Virginia		–		8	–	3	–	1
Syracuse		–		8	–	4	–	0
Southwestern Louisiana		–		7	–	4	–	0
Akron		–		6	–	4	–	1
South Carolina		–		6	–	4	–	1
Virginia Tech		–		6	–	4	–	1
Louisiana Tech		–		5	–	4	–	1
Army		–		6	–	5	–	0
Louisville		–		6	–	5	–	0
East Carolina		–		5	–	5	–	1
Tulsa		–		6	–	6	–	0
Southern Miss		–		5	–	6	–	0
Tulane		–		4	–	8	–	0
Navy		–		3	–	8	–	0
Rutgers		–		2	–	7	–	2
Boston College		–		2	–	9	–	0
Memphis State		–		2	–	9	–	0
Cincinnati		–		1	–	9	–	1
Temple		–		1	–	10	–	0
Rankings from AP Poll

The 1989 East Carolina Pirates football team was an American football team that represented East Carolina University as an independent during the 1989 NCAA Division I-A football season. In their first season under head coach Bill Lewis, the team compiled a 5–5–1 record.

== Schedule ==
Date	Opponent	Site	TV	Result	Attendance	Source
September 9	Bowling Green	Ficklen Memorial Stadium; Greenville, NC		W 41–6	33,412	
September 16	at Cincinnati	Nippert Stadium; Cincinnati, OH		W 21–14	18,153	
September 23	Illinois State	Ficklen Memorial Stadium; Greenville, NC		W 56–10	30,245	
September 30	Louisiana Tech	Ficklen Memorial Stadium; Greenville, NC		T 29–29	25,462	
October 7	at South Carolina	Williams–Brice Stadium; Columbia, SC		L 14–47	65,600	
October 21	Virginia Tech	Ficklen Memorial Stadium; Greenville, NC		W 14–10	35,100	
October 28	at Syracuse	Carrier Dome; Syracuse, NY	WITN	L 16–18	48,731	
November 4	at No. 7 Miami (FL)	Miami Orange Bowl; Miami, FL		L 10–40	35,159	
November 11	Temple	Ficklen Memorial Stadium; Greenville, NC		W 31–24	24,112	
November 18	at No. 19 Pittsburgh	Pitt Stadium; Pittsburgh, PA		L 42–47	21,862	
November 25	at Southern Miss	M. M. Roberts Stadium; Hattiesburg, MS		L 27–41	11,189	
Rankings from AP Poll released prior to the game
