= 1989 Louisiana Tech Bulldogs football team =

American college football season

1989 Louisiana Tech Bulldogs football
- Conference: Independent
- Record: 5–4–1
- Head coach: Joe Raymond Peace (2nd season)
- Offensive coordinator: Steve Ensminger (2nd season)
- Captains: Derrick Douglas; Eldonta Osborne
- Home stadium: Joe Aillet Stadium

1989 NCAA Division I-A independents football records
	Conf.			Overall
Team	W	L	T	W		L		T
No. 1 Miami (FL)		–		11	–	1	–	0
No. 2 Notre Dame		–		12	–	1	–	0
No. 3 Florida State		–		10	–	2	–	0
Northern Illinois		–		9	–	2	–	0
No. 15 Penn State		–		8	–	3	–	1
No. 17 Pittsburgh		–		8	–	3	–	1
No. 21 West Virginia		–		8	–	3	–	1
Syracuse		–		8	–	4	–	0
Southwestern Louisiana		–		7	–	4	–	0
Akron		–		6	–	4	–	1
South Carolina		–		6	–	4	–	1
Virginia Tech		–		6	–	4	–	1
Louisiana Tech		–		5	–	4	–	1
Army		–		6	–	5	–	0
Louisville		–		6	–	5	–	0
East Carolina		–		5	–	5	–	1
Tulsa		–		6	–	6	–	0
Southern Miss		–		5	–	6	–	0
Tulane		–		4	–	8	–	0
Navy		–		3	–	8	–	0
Rutgers		–		2	–	7	–	2
Boston College		–		2	–	9	–	0
Memphis State		–		2	–	9	–	0
Cincinnati		–		1	–	9	–	1
Temple		–		1	–	10	–	0
Rankings from AP Poll

The 1989 Louisiana Tech Bulldogs football team was an American football team that represented Louisiana Tech University as an I-A independent during the 1989 NCAA Division I-A football season. In their second year under head coach Joe Raymond Peace, the team compiled an 5–4–1 record.

== Schedule ==
Date	Opponent	Site	Result	Attendance	Source
September 2	at Southwestern Louisiana	Cajun Field; Lafayette, LA (rivalry)	W 40–14	20,200	
September 9	at Western Michigan	Waldo Stadium; Kalamazoo, MI	L 20–24	20,242	
September 16	at Florida	Ben Hill Griffin Stadium; Gainesville, FL	L 7–34	65,109	
September 30	at East Carolina	Ficklen Memorial Stadium; Greenville, NC	T 29–29	25,462	
October 7	at Akron	Rubber Bowl; Akron, OH	L 24–31	13,107	
October 14	Northern Illinois	Joe Aillet Stadium; Ruston, LA	W 42–21	17,300	
October 21	at Arkansas State	Indian Stadium; Jonesboro, AR	W 40–37	15,891	
October 28	Tulsa	Joe Aillet Stadium; Ruston, LA	W 34–31	17,100	
November 4	Northeast Louisiana	Joe Aillet Stadium; Ruston, LA (rivalry)	W 24–6	23,500	
November 11	at No. 12 Auburn	Jordan–Hare Stadium; Auburn, AL	L 23–38	77,237	
Rankings from AP Poll released prior to the game
