= 1989 Army Cadets football team =

American college football season

1989 Army Cadets football
- Conference: Independent
- Record: 6–5
- Head coach: Jim Young (7th season)
- Offensive coordinator: Greg Gregory (1st as OC; 8th overall season)
- Offensive scheme: Triple option
- Defensive coordinator: Bob Sutton (7th season)
- Base defense: 4–3
- Captains: Ben Barnett; Jack Frey; Will Huff
- Home stadium: Michie Stadium

1989 NCAA Division I-A independents football records
	Conf.			Overall
Team	W	L	T	W		L		T
No. 1 Miami (FL)		–		11	–	1	–	0
No. 2 Notre Dame		–		12	–	1	–	0
No. 3 Florida State		–		10	–	2	–	0
Northern Illinois		–		9	–	2	–	0
No. 15 Penn State		–		8	–	3	–	1
No. 17 Pittsburgh		–		8	–	3	–	1
No. 21 West Virginia		–		8	–	3	–	1
Syracuse		–		8	–	4	–	0
Southwestern Louisiana		–		7	–	4	–	0
Akron		–		6	–	4	–	1
South Carolina		–		6	–	4	–	1
Virginia Tech		–		6	–	4	–	1
Louisiana Tech		–		5	–	4	–	1
Army		–		6	–	5	–	0
Louisville		–		6	–	5	–	0
East Carolina		–		5	–	5	–	1
Tulsa		–		6	–	6	–	0
Southern Miss		–		5	–	6	–	0
Tulane		–		4	–	8	–	0
Navy		–		3	–	8	–	0
Rutgers		–		2	–	7	–	2
Boston College		–		2	–	9	–	0
Memphis State		–		2	–	9	–	0
Cincinnati		–		1	–	9	–	1
Temple		–		1	–	10	–	0
Rankings from AP Poll

The 1989 Army Cadets football team was an American football team that represented the United States Military Academy as an independent during the 1989 NCAA Division I-A football season. In their seventh season under head coach Jim Young, the Cadets compiled a 6–5 record and outscored their opponents by a combined total of 316 to 212. In the annual Army–Navy Game, the Cadets lost to Navy, 19–17.

== Schedule ==
Date	Opponent	Site	TV	Result	Attendance	Source
September 16	at Syracuse	Carrier Dome; Syracuse, NY		L 7–10	48,331	
September 23	Wake Forest	Michie Stadium; West Point, NY		W 14–10	35,898	
September 30	Harvard	Michie Stadium; West Point, NY		W 56–28	39,115	
October 7	at Duke	Wallace Wade Stadium; Durham, NC		L 29–35	25,200	
October 14	Holy Cross	Michie Stadium; West Point, NY		W 45–9	40,869	
October 21	Lafayette	Michie Stadium; West Point, NY		W 34–20	40,478	
October 28	Rutgers	Michie Stadium; West Point, NY		W 35–14	40,701	
November 4	at Air Force	Falcon Stadium; Colorado Springs, CO (Commander-in-Chief's Trophy)		L 3–29	52,226	
November 11	Boston College	Michie Stadium; West Point, NY		L 17–24	41,105	
November 18	Colgate	Michie Stadium; West Point, NY		W 59–14	39,404	
December 9	vs. Navy	Giants Stadium; East Rutherford, NJ (Army–Navy Game)	CBS	L 17–19	75,721	

== Game summaries ==
=== Wake Forest ===
External videos
- Army highlights

=== Rutgers ===
External videos
- Full game
- Army highlights

=== vs Navy ===
Army Cadets vs. Navy Midshipmen

Quarter	1	2	3	4	Total
Navy	9	0	7	3	19
Army	0	14	3	0	17

at Giants Stadium • East Rutherford, New Jersey

- Date: December 9
- Game attendance: 75,721
- TV announcers (CBS): Jim Nantz, Pat Haden, and John Dockery
- NY Times

Scoring summary

Quarter	Time	Drive			Team	Scoring information	Score	
Quarter	Time	Plays	Yards	TOP	Team	Scoring information	NAVY	ARMY
1					Navy	Mason 54-yard touchdown reception from Alton Grizzard, Fred Schenk kick no good	6	0
1					Navy	38-yard field goal by Fred Schenk	9	0
2					Army	Calvin Cass 1-yard touchdown run, kick good	9	7
2					Army	Calvin Cass 1-yard touchdown run, kick good	9	14
3					Navy	Purifoy 3-yard touchdown run, Fred Schenk kick good	16	14
3					Army	22-yard field goal by Havenstrite	16	17
4	0:11		63		Navy	32-yard field goal by Fred Schenk	19	17
"TOP" = time of possession. For other American football terms, see Glossary of American football.							19	17

== Roster ==
1989 Army Cadets football team roster
Players
Coaches
Offense

Pos.	#	Name	Class
OL		Pete Andrysiak
WR		Doug Baker
RB		Ben Barnett
RB		Calvin Cass	Jr
OL		Steve Chalout
TE		Mark Dawkins
RB		Dave Foye
OL		Jack Frey
RB		Taylor Gray
WR		Rob Horn
RB		Scott Jerald
WR		Sean Jordan
RB		Andy Kudlak
RB		Corbett Leatherwood
RB		Pat Mangin
RB		Rob Martinez
RB		Mike Mayweather
QB		William McMillian
QB		Bryan McWilliams
RB		Edrian Oliver
OL		Bret Petkus
OL		Carlton Rice
QB		Morrell Savoy
OL		John Silvers
OL		Bill Speier
RB		Callian Thomas
RB		Dan White
QB		Myreon Williams
WR		Cam Worsham

Defense

Pos.	#	Name	Class
DB		Percy Coard
LB		Pat Davie
LB		Bert DeForest
DB		Jerry Farnsworth
DB		Ed Givens
DL		Will Huff
DL		Tim Ladouceur
DB		Otto Leone
DB		Mike McElrath
LB		Anthony Noto
LB	48	Mike O'Toole
DL		Rod Ofte
LB		John Robb
DB		Arlen Smith
DB		Mike Thorson
LB		Bob Wagner

Special teams

Pos.	#	Name	Class
K		Keith Havenstrite
K		Charles Mercure
P		Greg Pease

Head coach

- Jim Young

Coordinators/assistant coaches

Legend

- (C) Team captain
- (S) Suspended
- (I) Ineligible
- Injured
- Redshirt
