= 1989 South Carolina Gamecocks football team =

American college football season

1989 South Carolina Gamecocks football
- Conference: Independent
- Record: 6–4–1
- Head coach: Sparky Woods (1st season)
- Offensive coordinator: Art Wilkins (1st season)
- Defensive coordinator: Rick Whitt (1st season)
- Home stadium: Williams–Brice Stadium

1989 NCAA Division I-A independents football records
	Conf.			Overall
Team	W	L	T	W		L		T
No. 1 Miami (FL)		–		11	–	1	–	0
No. 2 Notre Dame		–		12	–	1	–	0
No. 3 Florida State		–		10	–	2	–	0
Northern Illinois		–		9	–	2	–	0
No. 15 Penn State		–		8	–	3	–	1
No. 17 Pittsburgh		–		8	–	3	–	1
No. 21 West Virginia		–		8	–	3	–	1
Syracuse		–		8	–	4	–	0
Southwestern Louisiana		–		7	–	4	–	0
Akron		–		6	–	4	–	1
South Carolina		–		6	–	4	–	1
Virginia Tech		–		6	–	4	–	1
Louisiana Tech		–		5	–	4	–	1
Army		–		6	–	5	–	0
Louisville		–		6	–	5	–	0
East Carolina		–		5	–	5	–	1
Tulsa		–		6	–	6	–	0
Southern Miss		–		5	–	6	–	0
Tulane		–		4	–	8	–	0
Navy		–		3	–	8	–	0
Rutgers		–		2	–	7	–	2
Boston College		–		2	–	9	–	0
Memphis State		–		2	–	9	–	0
Cincinnati		–		1	–	9	–	1
Temple		–		1	–	10	–	0
Rankings from AP Poll

The 1989 South Carolina Gamecocks football team represented the University of South Carolina as an independent during the 1989 NCAA Division I-A football season. Led by first-year head coach Sparky Woods, the Gamecocks compiled a record of 6–4–1. The team played home games at Williams–Brice Stadium in Columbia, South Carolina.

Woods succeeded Joe Morrison, who died of a heart attack in February 1989. Woods was previously the head coach at Appalachian State, having won two Southern Conference titles and been named Southern Conference Coach of the Year in three consecutive years.

In 1989, South Carolina started 5–1–1 and ranked No. 25 in the country. However, in the eighth game against No. 20 NC State, senior star quarterback Todd Ellis, considered arguably the most impactful player in program history until then, suffered a college career-ending injury. The Gamecocks subsequently lost three of their last four games, were not selected for a bowl game, and finished unranked.

== Schedule ==
Date	Time	Opponent	Rank	Site	TV	Result	Attendance	Source
September 2	7:00 pm	Duke		Williams–Brice Stadium; Columbia, SC		W 27–21	74,232	
September 9	7:00 pm	Virginia Tech		Williams–Brice Stadium; Columbia, SC		T 17–17	71,842	
September 16	1:00 pm	at No. 12 West Virginia		Mountaineer Field; Morgantown, WV		L 21–45	66,015	
September 23	7:00 pm	Georgia Tech		Williams–Brice Stadium; Columbia, SC		W 21–10	70,018	
September 30	1:00 pm	at No. 23 Georgia		Sanford Stadium; Athens, GA (rivalry)		W 24–20	80,961	
October 7	1:30 pm	East Carolina		Williams–Brice Stadium; Columbia, SC		W 47–14	65,600	
October 21	1:30 pm	Western Carolina	No. 24	Williams–Brice Stadium; Columbia, SC		W 24–3	62,000	
October 28	1:00 pm	No. 20 NC State	No. 25	Williams–Brice Stadium; Columbia, SC		L 10–20	74,248	
November 4	2:00 pm	at No. 6 Florida State		Doak Campbell Stadium; Tallahassee, FL	SSN	L 10–35	61,852	
November 11	2:00 pm	at North Carolina		Kenan Memorial Stadium; Chapel Hill, NC (rivalry)		W 27–20	44,200	
November 18	7:30 pm	No. 15 Clemson		Williams–Brice Stadium; Columbia, SC (rivalry)	ESPN	L 0–45	74,509	
Rankings from AP Poll released prior to the game; All times are in Eastern time

== Roster ==
Todd Ellis* QB Dickie DeMasi QB Ben Hogan QB Pat Turner QB Harold Green* RB Mike Dingle RB Albert Haynes RB Ken Watson RB Keith Bing RB Kevin Jones RB Robert Brooks* WR Eddie Miller* WR George Rush* WR Carl Platt WR David Pitchko WR Skeets Thomas WR Bill Zorr WR Darren Greene WR David Hodge* TE Charles Steward TE Dany Branch* OL Ike Harris* OL Kenny Haynes* OL Curt High* OL Calvin Stephens* OL Hal Hamrick OL Antoine Rivens OL Marty Dye* DL Curtis Godwin* DL Tim High* DL Corey Miller* DL Patrick Blackwell DL Troy Duke DL Trent Simpson DL Robert Gibson* LB Patrick Hinton* LB David Taylor* LB Scott Windsor* LB Mike Conway LB Joe Reaves LB Keith Emmons LB Erik Anderson* DB Leon Harris* DB Keith McDonald* DB Antonio Walker DB Stephane Williams DB
