= 1989 West Virginia Mountaineers football team =

American college football season

1989 West Virginia Mountaineers football

Gator Bowl, L 7–27 vs. Clemson
- Conference: Independent

Ranking
- AP: No. 21
- Record: 8–3–1
- Head coach: Don Nehlen (10th season)
- Offensive scheme: Option
- Home stadium: Mountaineer Field

1989 Major eastern college football independents records
	Conf.					Overall
Team	W		L		T	W		L		T
No. 15 Penn State $	6	–	0	–	0	8	–	3	–	1
No. 17 Pittsburgh	4	–	1	–	1	8	–	3	–	1
No. 21 West Virginia	3	–	1	–	1	8	–	3	–	1
Syracuse	3	–	3	–	0	8	–	4	–	0
Temple	1	–	4	–	0	1	–	10	–	0
Rutgers	1	–	5	–	0	2	–	7	–	2
Boston College	1	–	5	–	0	2	–	9	–	0
$ – Lambert Trophy Winner; Rankings from AP Poll

1989 NCAA Division I-A independents football records
	Conf.			Overall
Team	W	L	T	W		L		T
No. 1 Miami (FL)		–		11	–	1	–	0
No. 2 Notre Dame		–		12	–	1	–	0
No. 3 Florida State		–		10	–	2	–	0
Northern Illinois		–		9	–	2	–	0
No. 15 Penn State		–		8	–	3	–	1
No. 17 Pittsburgh		–		8	–	3	–	1
No. 21 West Virginia		–		8	–	3	–	1
Syracuse		–		8	–	4	–	0
Southwestern Louisiana		–		7	–	4	–	0
Akron		–		6	–	4	–	1
South Carolina		–		6	–	4	–	1
Virginia Tech		–		6	–	4	–	1
Louisiana Tech		–		5	–	4	–	1
Army		–		6	–	5	–	0
Louisville		–		6	–	5	–	0
East Carolina		–		5	–	5	–	1
Tulsa		–		6	–	6	–	0
Southern Miss		–		5	–	6	–	0
Tulane		–		4	–	8	–	0
Navy		–		3	–	8	–	0
Rutgers		–		2	–	7	–	2
Boston College		–		2	–	9	–	0
Memphis State		–		2	–	9	–	0
Cincinnati		–		1	–	9	–	1
Temple		–		1	–	10	–	0
Rankings from AP Poll

The 1989 West Virginia Mountaineers football team represented West Virginia University as an independent during the 1989 NCAA Division I-A football season. Led by tenth-year head coach Don Nehlen, the Mountaineers compiled a record of 8–3–1 with a loss to Clemson in the Gator Bowl. West Virginia played home games at Mountaineer Field in Morgantown, West Virginia.

== Schedule ==
Date	Opponent	Rank	Site	Result	Attendance	Source
September 2	Ball State	No. 17	Mountaineer Field; Morgantown, WV	W 35–10	57,866	
September 9	at Maryland	No. 17	Byrd Stadium; College Park, MD (rivalry)	W 14–10	45,000	
September 16	South Carolina	No. 12	Mountaineer Field; Morgantown, WV	W 45–21	66,015	
September 23	at Louisville	No. 9	Cardinal Stadium; Louisville, KY	W 30–21	39,132	
September 30	No. 10 Pittsburgh	No. 9	Mountaineer Field; Morgantown, WV (Backyard Brawl)	T 31–31	68,938	
October 7	Virginia Tech	No. 9	Mountaineer Field; Morgantown, WV (rivalry)	L 10–12	62,563	
October 21	Cincinnati	No. 18	Mountaineer Field; Morgantown, WV	W 69–3	47,176	
October 28	at Boston College	No. 15	Alumni Stadium; Chestnut Hill, MA	W 44–30	32,000	
November 4	at No. 16 Penn State	No. 13	Beaver Stadium; University Park, PA (rivalry)	L 9–19	85,911	
November 11	Rutgers	No. 19	Mountaineer Field; Morgantown, WV	W 21–20	61,336	
November 23	at Syracuse	No. 17	Carrier Dome; Syracuse, NY (rivalry)	W 24–17	46,757	
December 30	vs. No. 14 Clemson*	No. 17	Gator Bowl Stadium; Jacksonville, FL (Gator Bowl)	L 7–27	82,911	
*Non-conference game; Rankings from AP Poll released prior to the game

== Season summary ==
Coming off of its first ever 11-win season and with junior Major Harris returning to lead a potent offense, West Virginia entered the 1989 season ranked 17th in the AP Poll and with high expectations. The Mountaineers started the season accordingly, racing to a 4–0 record and to #9 in the AP Poll. In Week 5 against #10 Pitt, however, West Virginia fell victim to another memorable collapse in the Backyard Brawl. Trailing 31–9 in the 4th quarter, Pitt scored 22 unanswered points and kicked a game-tying field goal as time expired to force a 31–31 tie. The Mountaineers would suffer another heartbreaking result the following week with a 12–10 home loss to Virginia Tech, as well as a 19–9 loss to #16 Penn State in State College. Despite those disappointing defeats, WVU finished the regular season at 8–2–1, a #17 ranking in the AP Poll, and a trip to the Gator Bowl to face #14 Clemson. The Mountaineers faltered, however, losing 27–7 and finished the season at 8–3–1 with a #21 ranking in the final AP Poll.

== Roster ==
1989 West Virginia Mountaineers football team roster
Players
Coaches
Offense

Pos.	#	Name	Class
WR	2	Greg Dykes	Sr
RB	3	Eugene Napoleon	Sr
QB	9	Major Harris	Jr
WR	11	Wes Jackson	Jr
WR	15	James Jett	Fr
WR	16	David Miers	Sr
QB	16	Chris Gray	So
QB	17	James Breitbeil	So
FB	20	Craig Taylor	Sr
RB	32	Garrett Ford, Jr.	Fr
FB	36	Aaron Evans	Jr
OT	72	Jack Linn	Sr
G	74	Larry Cook	Jr
G, C	77	Mike Compton	Fr
WR	88	Reggie Rembert	Sr

Defense

Pos.	#	Name	Class
LB	4	Steve Grant	So
DB	11	Darrell Whitmore	So
MG	44	Roger Dixon	Sr
LB	46	E. J. Wheeler	Jr
LB	47	Gary Suda	Fr
LB	48	Rob Yachini	Jr
LB	49	Chris Haering	Sr
DT	61	Mike Fox	Sr
DE	87	Renaldo Turnbull	Sr

Special teams

Pos.	#	Name	Class

Head coach

- Don Nehlen

Coordinators/assistant coaches

Legend

- (C) Team captain
- (S) Suspended
- (I) Ineligible
- Injured
- Redshirt

== Statistical leaders ==
All stats are courtesy of WVUStats.com unless otherwise cited.

- Passing:

Major Harris - 142/245, 2,058 yards, 17 touchdowns, 11 interceptions

- Rushing:

Major Harris - 155 carries, 936 yards, 6.0 average per carry, six touchdowns
Garrett Ford, Jr. - 148 carries, 733 yards, 5.0 average per carry, six touchdowns

- Receiving:

Reggie Rembert - 47 receptions, 850 yards, 11 touchdowns

- Interceptions:

Preston Waters - 7 interceptions
