= 1989 Southern Miss Golden Eagles football team =

American college football season

1989 Southern Miss Golden Eagles football
- Conference: Independent
- Record: 5–6
- Head coach: Curley Hallman (2nd season)
- Offensive coordinator: Jeff Bower (2nd season)
- Offensive scheme: I formation
- Defensive coordinator: Ellis Johnson (2nd season)
- Base defense: 4–3
- Home stadium: M. M. Roberts Stadium

1989 NCAA Division I-A independents football records
	Conf.			Overall
Team	W	L	T	W		L		T
No. 1 Miami (FL)		–		11	–	1	–	0
No. 2 Notre Dame		–		12	–	1	–	0
No. 3 Florida State		–		10	–	2	–	0
Northern Illinois		–		9	–	2	–	0
No. 15 Penn State		–		8	–	3	–	1
No. 17 Pittsburgh		–		8	–	3	–	1
No. 21 West Virginia		–		8	–	3	–	1
Syracuse		–		8	–	4	–	0
Southwestern Louisiana		–		7	–	4	–	0
Akron		–		6	–	4	–	1
South Carolina		–		6	–	4	–	1
Virginia Tech		–		6	–	4	–	1
Louisiana Tech		–		5	–	4	–	1
Army		–		6	–	5	–	0
Louisville		–		6	–	5	–	0
East Carolina		–		5	–	5	–	1
Tulsa		–		6	–	6	–	0
Southern Miss		–		5	–	6	–	0
Tulane		–		4	–	8	–	0
Navy		–		3	–	8	–	0
Rutgers		–		2	–	7	–	2
Boston College		–		2	–	9	–	0
Memphis State		–		2	–	9	–	0
Cincinnati		–		1	–	9	–	1
Temple		–		1	–	10	–	0
Rankings from AP Poll

The 1989 Southern Miss Golden Eagles football team was an American football team that represented the University of Southern Mississippi as an independent during the 1989 NCAA Division I-A football season. In their second year under head coach Curley Hallman, the team compiled a 5–6 record.

The 1989 Golden Eagles, led offensively by quarterback Brett Favre and defensively by linebacker Orlando Harris, had one of the biggest upsets of the college football season when they beat Florida State by a score of 30–26. In a game against Louisville, Southern Miss was on its own 21-yard line with six seconds left in a 10–10 tie. This was the result of a missed field goal by Louisville would have given them the lead. Favre threw a Hail Mary pass that was deflected, but it bounced off the helmet of Southern Mississippi's Michael Jackson and into the hands of wide receiver Darryl Tillman, who scored a touchdown with no time left. The play was later voted on as one of the "Top 5 Memorable Moments" in college football history in an online vote at ESPN.com.

== Schedule ==
Date	Opponent	Rank	Site	TV	Result	Attendance	Source
September 2	vs. No. 6 Florida State		Gator Bowl Stadium; Jacksonville, FL	TBS	W 30–26	48,746	
September 9	Mississippi State	No. 18	M. M. Roberts Stadium; Hattiesburg, MS		L 23–26	34,189	
September 16	at No. 5 Auburn		Jordan–Hare Stadium; Auburn, AL		L 3–24	83,465	
September 23	at TCU		Amon G. Carter Stadium; Fort Worth, TX		L 17–19	15,839	
September 30	at No. 22 Texas A&M		Kyle Field; College Station, TX		L 14–31	58,843	
October 7	Tulane		M. M. Roberts Stadium; Hattiesburg, MS (rivalry)		W 30–21	18,891	
October 14	at Louisville		Cardinal Stadium; Louisville, KY		W 16–10	38,484	
October 21	Southwestern Louisiana^{†}		M.M. Roberts Stadium; Hattiesburg, MS		L 21–24	20,732	
October 28	at Memphis State		Liberty Bowl Memorial Stadium; Memphis, TN (rivalry)		W 31–7	18,572	
November 18	at No. 4 Alabama		Bryant–Denny Stadium; Tuscaloosa, AL		L 14–37	70,123	
November 25	East Carolina		M. M. Roberts Stadium; Hattiesburg, MS		W 41–27	11,189	
^{†}Homecoming; Rankings from AP Poll released prior to the game

== Game summaries ==
=== Florida State ===
#6 Florida State vs. Southern Miss

Team	1	2	3	4	Total
Seminoles	10	0	13	3	26
• Golden Eagles	3	14	0	13	30

- Date: September 2
- Location: Gator Bowl Stadium, Jacksonville, FL
- Game start: 12:30 p.m. EDT
- Game attendance: 48,746
- Television network: TBS

Scoring summary
Q1		FSU	Dexter Carter 11-yard run (Mason kick)	FSU 7–0
Q1		FSU	Bill Mason 24-yard field goal	FSU 10–0
Q1	0:17	USM	Chuck Davis 22-yard field goal	FSU 10–3
Q2		USM	Eddie Ray Jackson 3-yard run (Davis kick)	Tied 10–10
Q2	0:11	USM	Alfred Williams 4-yard pass from Brett Favre (Davis kick)	USM 17–10
Q3		FSU	Lawrence Dawsey 23-yard pass from Peter Tom Willis (Mason kick)	Tied 17–17
Q3		FSU	Dexter Carter 9-yard run (kick failed)	FSU 23–17
Q4		USM	Rickey Bradley 10-yard run (Davis kick)	USM 24–23
Q4	6:57	FSU	Bill Mason 27-yard field goal	FSU 26–24
Q4	0:23	USM	Anthony Harris 2-yard pass from Brett Favre (pass failed)	USM 30–26

== Roster ==
1989 Southern Miss Golden Eagles football team roster
Players
Coaches
Offense

Pos.	#	Name	Class
QB	4	Brett Favre	Jr
TE	80	Anthony Harris	Jr
RG	56	Chafan Marsh	So
RT	78	Chris Ryals	So

Defense

Pos.	#	Name	Class

Special teams

Pos.	#	Name	Class
K	32	Chuck Davis

Head coach

- Curley Hallman

Coordinators/assistant coaches

Legend

- (C) Team captain
- (S) Suspended
- (I) Ineligible
- Injured
- Redshirt

== Team players in the NFL ==
Player	Position	Round	Pick	NFL club
Eugene Rowell	Wide receiver	9	240	Cleveland Browns
Reginald Warnsley	Running back	11	285	Detroit Lions

- Brett Favre, Michael Jackson and Simmie Carter would be drafted in the 1991 NFL draft.
