= 1989 Virginia Tech Hokies football team =

American college football season

1989 Virginia Tech Hokies football
- Conference: Independent
- Record: 6–4–1
- Head coach: Frank Beamer (3rd season)
- Offensive coordinator: Steve Marshall (2nd season)
- Offensive scheme: Pro-style
- Defensive coordinator: Mike Clark (2nd season)
- Base defense: 4–4
- Home stadium: Lane Stadium

1989 NCAA Division I-A independents football records
	Conf.			Overall
Team	W	L	T	W		L		T
No. 1 Miami (FL)		–		11	–	1	–	0
No. 2 Notre Dame		–		12	–	1	–	0
No. 3 Florida State		–		10	–	2	–	0
Northern Illinois		–		9	–	2	–	0
No. 15 Penn State		–		8	–	3	–	1
No. 17 Pittsburgh		–		8	–	3	–	1
No. 21 West Virginia		–		8	–	3	–	1
Syracuse		–		8	–	4	–	0
Southwestern Louisiana		–		7	–	4	–	0
Akron		–		6	–	4	–	1
South Carolina		–		6	–	4	–	1
Virginia Tech		–		6	–	4	–	1
Louisiana Tech		–		5	–	4	–	1
Army		–		6	–	5	–	0
Louisville		–		6	–	5	–	0
East Carolina		–		5	–	5	–	1
Tulsa		–		6	–	6	–	0
Southern Miss		–		5	–	6	–	0
Tulane		–		4	–	8	–	0
Navy		–		3	–	8	–	0
Rutgers		–		2	–	7	–	2
Boston College		–		2	–	9	–	0
Memphis State		–		2	–	9	–	0
Cincinnati		–		1	–	9	–	1
Temple		–		1	–	10	–	0
Rankings from AP Poll

The 1989 Virginia Tech Hokies football team represented Virginia Polytechnic Institute and State University as an independent during the 1989 NCAA Division I-A football season. Led by third-year head coach Frank Beamer, the Hokies finished 6–4–1, giving Beamer his first winning season at Virginia Tech. The team played its home games at Lane Stadium in Blacksburg, Virginia.

Virginia Tech opened with a 29–3 victory over Akron and rallied from a 14-point deficit the following week to tie South Carolina 17–17. A 27–7 loss to No. 7 Clemson followed before the Hokies shut out Temple 23–0. After an open date, four Mickey Thomas field goals carried Tech to a 12–10 upset of No. 9 West Virginia in Morgantown.

The Hokies then lost consecutive games to No. 19 Florida State, 41–7, and East Carolina, 14–10. Virginia Tech rebounded with a 30–13 homecoming victory over Tulane while assistant head coach Billy Hite served as acting head coach as Beamer recovered from coronary angioplasty surgery. Thomas accounted for all of Tech's points the next week with six field goals in an 18–0 shutout of Vanderbilt.

Virginia Tech trailed No. 18 Virginia 24–0 at halftime before scoring 25 second-half points in a 32–25 loss. The Hokies closed the season with a 25–23 victory at NC State to finish 6–4–1. Over 11 games, Virginia Tech scored 203 points and allowed 180.

The season featured a change at quarterback. Will Furrer started the first four games, Cam Young made five starts, and Rodd Wooten started the finale. Vaughn Hebron led Virginia Tech with 584 rushing yards, Tony Kennedy added 534, and Myron Richardson led the receiving corps with 455 yards and four touchdowns. Bobby Martin led the defense with 79 total tackles, followed by Scott Hill with 76, Sean Lucas with 73, Jimmy Whitten with 72 and Randy Cockrell with 71.

== Schedule ==
Date	Time	Opponent	Site	TV	Result	Attendance	Source
September 2	12:08 p.m.	Akron	Lane Stadium; Blacksburg, VA	SCA	W 29–3	28,371	
September 9	7:00 p.m.	at South Carolina	Williams–Brice Stadium; Columbia, SC		T 17–17	71,824	
September 16	7:09 p.m.	No. 7 Clemson	Lane Stadium; Blacksburg, VA	WJPR	L 7–27	47,152	
September 23	12:10 p.m.	Temple	Lane Stadium; Blacksburg, VA	WJPR	W 23–0	32,157	
October 7	1:00 p.m.	at No. 9 West Virginia	Mountaineer Field; Morgantown, WV (rivalry)		W 12–10	62,563	
October 14	12:10 p.m.	No. 19 Florida State	Lane Stadium; Blacksburg, VA	WJPR	L 7–41	41,832	
October 21	2:00 p.m.	at East Carolina	Ficklen Memorial Stadium; Greenville, NC		L 10–14	35,100	
October 28	12:09 p.m.	Tulane^{†}	Lane Stadium; Blacksburg, VA	SCA	W 30–13	26,353	
November 4	12:09 p.m.	Vanderbilt	Lane Stadium; Blacksburg, VA	WJPR	W 18–0	23,752	
November 11	1:01 p.m.	at No. 18 Virginia	Scott Stadium; Charlottesville, VA (rivalry)		L 25–32	44,300	
November 18	1:00 p.m.	at NC State	Carter–Finley Stadium; Raleigh, NC		W 25–23	43,100	
^{†}Homecoming; Rankings from AP Poll released prior to the game; All times are in Eastern time

== Game summaries ==
=== Akron ===
Team	1	2	3	4	Total
Akron	0	0	3	0	3
• Virginia Tech	16	0	6	7	29

- Date: September 2
- Location: Lane Stadium, Blacksburg, VA
- Game start: 12:08 p.m. EDT
- Elapsed time: 3:04
- Game attendance: 28,371
- Game weather: Sunny, 77 °F (25 °C), Winds NW 13 mph (21 km/h)
Box Score

Three touchdown passes helped Virginia Tech open the season with a 29–3 victory over Akron on September 2, 1989, at Lane Stadium. The Hokies scored 16 points in the first quarter and held Akron out of the end zone while outgaining the Zips 405–139.

Jon Jeffries opened the scoring with an 8-yard touchdown reception from Will Furrer. Mickey Thomas added a 21-yard field goal, and Furrer found Myron Richardson for a 39-yard touchdown before the end of the first quarter. Jeffries scored on a 40-yard run in the third, and Richardson caught a 24-yard touchdown pass in the fourth.

Furrer completed 10 of 18 passes for 211 yards, three touchdowns and one interception. Jeffries led the rushing game with 93 yards on 13 carries and caught two passes for 61 yards, while Richardson led the receivers with 63 yards and two touchdowns. Tech finished with 152 rushing yards and 253 passing yards.

The Hokies recorded five tackles for loss and two sacks. James Hargrove led Tech with seven tackles, while Jimmy Whitten recorded both a tackle for loss and a sack. Virginia Tech recovered two Akron fumbles and limited the Zips to 43 rushing yards.

=== South Carolina ===
Team	1	2	3	4	Total
Virginia Tech	0	14	3	0	17
South Carolina	14	0	0	3	17

- Date: September 9
- Location: Williams–Brice Stadium, Columbia, SC
- Game start: 7:00 p.m. EDT
- Elapsed time: 2:53
- Game attendance: 71,824
- Game weather: Clear, 85 °F (29 °C), Winds SE 7 mph (11 km/h)
Box Score

A 33-yard field goal with 52 seconds remaining left Virginia Tech and South Carolina tied 17–17 on September 9, 1989, before 71,824 at Williams–Brice Stadium. The Hokies erased a 14–0 first-quarter deficit, went ahead in the third quarter and came within a minute of leaving Columbia with a victory.

Harold Green's 44-yard run and Todd Ellis' 13-yard touchdown pass to Robert Brooks put South Carolina ahead 14–0. Jeffries answered with touchdown runs of 5 and 1 yards in the second quarter, and Thomas' 26-yard field goal gave Tech a 17–14 lead. Collin Mackie's late kick produced the tie.

Virginia Tech outgained South Carolina 355–247. Furrer completed 16 of 33 passes for 212 yards with one interception. Jeffries led the Hokies with 59 rushing yards on 13 carries, and Richardson caught five passes for 84 yards. Tech possessed the ball for 34:48.

The Hokies recorded four tackles for loss and six sacks. Bryan Campbell led Tech with 12 tackles and had three sacks and a tackle for loss. Scott Hill added 10 tackles with a sack and a tackle for loss. Roger Brown intercepted Ellis, and Scott Hill recovered a South Carolina fumble.

=== No. 7 Clemson ===
Team	1	2	3	4	Total
• No. 7 Clemson	7	3	17	0	27
Virginia Tech	0	0	7	0	7

- Date: September 16
- Location: Lane Stadium, Blacksburg, VA
- Game start: 7:09 p.m. EDT
- Elapsed time: 2:52
- Game attendance: 47,152
- Game weather: Cloudy, 70 °F (21 °C), Calm winds
Box Score

No. 7 Clemson held Virginia Tech's offense without a touchdown in a 27–7 victory on September 16, 1989, at Lane Stadium. The Tigers built a 20–0 lead, and Tech's only score came on a Marcus Mickel kickoff return before Clemson answered immediately with an interception return for a touchdown.

Terry Allen scored on a 16-yard run, Chris Gardocki kicked field goals of 40 and 37 yards, and Allen connected with Gary Cooper for a 66-yard touchdown. Mickel returned the ensuing kickoff 90 yards for Tech's touchdown, but Levon Kirkland returned a Virginia Tech interception 47 yards for a score 19 seconds later.

Clemson outgained the Hokies 290–243. Furrer completed 16 of 32 passes for 148 yards and one interception, while Cam Young added 12 passing yards and threw two interceptions. Young led Tech with 27 rushing yards on three carries, and Vaughn Hebron led the receivers with 45 yards on five catches. Virginia Tech committed five turnovers.

Tech recorded four tackles for loss but no sacks. Darwin Herdman and Damien Russell shared the team lead with 11 tackles apiece. Clemson rushed for 202 yards and controlled the ball for 33:25.

=== Temple ===
Team	1	2	3	4	Total
Temple	0	0	0	0	0
• Virginia Tech	7	10	3	3	23

- Date: September 23
- Location: Lane Stadium, Blacksburg, VA
- Game start: 12:10 p.m. EDT
- Elapsed time: 3:10
- Game attendance: 32,157
- Game weather: Rain, 71 °F (22 °C), Winds W 12 mph (19 km/h)
Box Score

A defense that drove Temple backward on the ground carried the Hokies to a 23–0 victory on September 23, 1989, at Lane Stadium. Virginia Tech held the Owls to minus-24 rushing yards and 104 total yards while scoring in every quarter.

Tony Kennedy opened the scoring with a 3-yard touchdown run, and Vaughn Hebron added a 1-yard score. Thomas kicked field goals of 26, 31 and 29 yards to account for the final nine points.

Virginia Tech gained 332 yards, including 241 on the ground. Cam Young completed 9 of 20 passes for 62 yards with no interceptions and led the passing game. Kennedy rushed for 89 yards on 15 carries, while Richardson led Tech receivers with 33 yards on three catches.

The Virginia Tech season statistics credit the defense with one tackle for loss and nine individual sacks. Bobby Martin led Tech with nine tackles, while Jock Jones and Sean Lucas each recorded two sacks. The Hokies intercepted two passes and recovered two Temple fumbles.

=== No. 9 West Virginia ===
Team	1	2	3	4	Total
• Virginia Tech	3	6	0	3	12
No. 9 West Virginia	0	0	10	0	10

- Date: October 7
- Location: Mountaineer Field, Morgantown, WV
- Game start: 1:00 p.m. EDT
- Elapsed time: 2:40
- Game attendance: 62,563
- Game weather: Cool and partly sunny, 57 °F (14 °C), Calm winds
Box Score

Four field goals by Mickey Thomas gave the Hokies a 12–10 upset of No. 9 West Virginia on October 7, 1989, before 62,563 at Mountaineer Field. Virginia Tech led 9–0 at halftime, fell behind during a 10-point West Virginia third quarter and reclaimed the lead on Thomas' fourth field goal.

Thomas connected from 42, 22 and 27 yards before halftime. Brad Carroll's 37-yard field goal and Major Harris' 14-yard touchdown pass to Charlie Fedorco put West Virginia ahead 10–9. Thomas answered from 24 yards with 8:28 remaining, and Tech's defense protected the two-point lead.

Virginia Tech outgained West Virginia 291–185. Young completed 15 of 22 passes for 167 yards without an interception. Kennedy led the rushing game with 41 yards on 18 carries, and Richardson caught five passes for 69 yards. Tech possessed the ball for 35:48.

The Hokies recorded four tackles for loss and two individual sacks in the Virginia Tech season statistics. Jimmy Whitten led the defense with nine tackles. Jock Jones had both a tackle for loss and a sack, and Sean Lucas recorded the other sack. Kirk Alexander and Jones intercepted Major Harris, while Al Chamblee recovered a fumble.

=== No. 19 Florida State ===
Team	1	2	3	4	Total
• No. 19 Florida State	7	17	10	7	41
Virginia Tech	0	0	0	7	7

- Date: October 14
- Location: Lane Stadium, Blacksburg, VA
- Game start: 12:10 p.m. EDT
- Elapsed time: 3:11
- Game attendance: 41,832
- Game weather: Sunny, 70 °F (21 °C), Winds NW 0 to 3 mph (0.0 to 4.8 km/h)
Box Score

No. 19 Florida State scored the first 41 points in a 41–7 victory over Virginia Tech on October 14, 1989, at Lane Stadium. The Seminoles led 24–0 at halftime and amassed 534 yards while holding the Hokies to 174.

Peter Tom Willis threw touchdown passes to Dexter Carter, Ronald Lewis and Amp Lee and added a 1-yard touchdown run. Florida State added two field goals and a fourth-quarter touchdown pass from Casey Weldon. Kevin Bennett produced Tech's only score with a 32-yard touchdown pass to Lamar Smith with 6:04 remaining.

Young completed 6 of 18 passes for 47 yards and three interceptions, while Rodd Wooten added 44 passing yards and Bennett completed his only attempt for the 32-yard touchdown. Kennedy led Tech with 60 rushing yards on 13 carries, and Smith led the receivers with 40 yards on two catches.

Virginia Tech recorded eight tackles for loss and one sack. Bobby Martin led the Hokies with 11 tackles. Leslie Bailey and Melendez Byrd each recorded two tackles for loss, while Jock Jones had both a tackle for loss and the team's sack. John Granby intercepted a pass, and Chad Grube and Archie Hopkins recovered fumbles.

=== East Carolina ===
Team	1	2	3	4	Total
Virginia Tech	7	0	0	3	10
• East Carolina	7	7	0	0	14

- Date: October 21
- Location: Ficklen Memorial Stadium, Greenville, NC
- Game start: 2:00 p.m. EDT
- Elapsed time: 2:45
- Game attendance: 35,100
- Game weather: Sunny, 57 °F (14 °C), Winds N 5 to 6 mph (8.0 to 9.7 km/h)
Box Score

A dominant rushing performance was not enough as Virginia Tech lost 14–10 to East Carolina on October 21, 1989, at Ficklen Memorial Stadium. The Hokies rushed for 342 yards and outgained the Pirates 372–200, but two lost fumbles and an interception helped keep Tech to 10 points.

Kennedy's 1-yard run gave Tech a 7–0 lead. Travis Hunter answered with an 11-yard touchdown run and later threw a 38-yard touchdown pass to Charlie Tyson. Thomas' 27-yard field goal with 9:28 remaining cut the deficit to four, but Virginia Tech did not score again.

Young completed 5 of 20 passes for 30 yards with one interception. Hebron carried 17 times for 135 yards, and Kennedy added 114 yards on 21 carries. Kevin Bennett led Tech's receivers with 31 yards on two catches.

The Hokies recorded eight tackles for loss and three individual sacks in the Virginia Tech season statistics. Randy Cockrell led Tech with 12 tackles and had two tackles for loss. Al Chamblee and Scott Hill each had two tackles for loss and a sack; Sean Lucas also recorded two tackles for loss and a sack, while Jock Jones had a tackle for loss and a sack. John Granby intercepted two East Carolina passes.

=== Tulane ===
Team	1	2	3	4	Total
Tulane	0	6	7	0	13
• Virginia Tech	3	7	3	17	30

- Date: October 28
- Location: Lane Stadium, Blacksburg, VA
- Game start: 12:09 p.m. EDT
- Elapsed time: 2:58
- Game attendance: 26,353
- Game weather: Sunny, 54 °F (12 °C), Winds NW 0 to 5 mph (0.0 to 8.0 km/h)
Box Score

Seventeen fourth-quarter points broke a 13–13 tie and gave the Hokies a 30–13 homecoming victory over Tulane on October 28, 1989, at Lane Stadium. Assistant head coach Billy Hite served as acting head coach while Frank Beamer recovered from coronary angioplasty surgery, and Tech held Tulane scoreless in the fourth quarter.

Thomas kicked a 27-yard field goal before Young connected with Richardson for an 8-yard touchdown. A second Thomas field goal made it 13–6, but Tulane tied the game in the third quarter. Young's 1-yard touchdown run restored the lead early in the fourth, Thomas added a 21-yard field goal, and Jock Jones returned an interception 55 yards for the final touchdown.

Virginia Tech outgained Tulane 338–183. Young completed 11 of 21 passes for 98 yards, one touchdown and no interceptions. Hebron led the Hokies with 118 rushing yards on 18 carries and 45 receiving yards on four catches. Tech controlled possession for 34:30.

The Virginia Tech season statistics credit the Hokies with three tackles for loss and five individual sacks. Bobby Martin led the defense with eight tackles. Chamblee recorded two sacks and a tackle for loss, while Hargrove and Lucas each had both a tackle for loss and a sack. Tech intercepted three passes, including Jones' touchdown return.

=== Vanderbilt ===
Team	1	2	3	4	Total
Vanderbilt	0	0	0	0	0
• Virginia Tech	0	9	6	3	18

- Date: November 4
- Location: Lane Stadium, Blacksburg, VA
- Game start: 12:09 p.m. EST
- Elapsed time: 2:48
- Game attendance: 23,752
- Game weather: Sunny, 45 °F (7 °C), Winds SE 5 to 10 mph (8.0 to 16.1 km/h)
Box Score

Six Mickey Thomas field goals supplied every point in Virginia Tech's 18–0 victory over Vanderbilt on November 4, 1989, at Lane Stadium. The Hokies held the Commodores to 146 yards, forced four turnovers and recorded their second shutout in six games.

Thomas kicked field goals of 39, 39 and 41 yards in the second quarter, then added kicks of 34 and 32 yards in the third and another 39-yarder early in the fourth. Virginia Tech never reached the end zone but led 9–0 at halftime and steadily increased the margin.

The Hokies gained 239 yards. Wooten completed 5 of 14 passes for 103 yards with one interception, while Young added 31 passing yards. Kennedy led the rushing game with 80 yards on 22 carries, and Richardson caught three passes for 79 yards.

Virginia Tech recorded six tackles for loss and two individual sacks in the season statistics. Scott Hill led the Hokies with eight tackles and had three tackles for loss and a sack. Tech intercepted one pass and recovered all three Vanderbilt fumbles.

=== No. 18 Virginia ===
Team	1	2	3	4	Total
Virginia Tech	0	0	16	9	25
• No. 18 Virginia	7	17	8	0	32

- Date: November 11
- Location: Scott Stadium, Charlottesville, VA
- Game start: 1:01 p.m. EST
- Elapsed time: 2:52
- Game attendance: 44,300
- Game weather: Excellent, 56 °F (13 °C), Winds S 19 mph (31 km/h)
Box Score

A 24–0 halftime deficit proved too large to overcome as the Hokies fell 32–25 to No. 18 Virginia on November 11, 1989, at Scott Stadium. Virginia Tech scored 25 points after halftime and cut the margin to seven with 4:26 remaining but never tied the game.

Virginia scored three touchdowns and a field goal before halftime. Wooten's 8-yard touchdown pass to Richardson and a successful two-point conversion put Tech on the board. After Virginia extended the lead to 32–8, Mickel scored on a 14-yard run and Tech again converted for two. Rich Fox scored from a yard out in the fourth quarter, though the conversion failed, and Thomas' 39-yard field goal made it 32–25.

Virginia outgained Tech 357–275. Wooten completed 9 of 16 passes for 102 yards, one touchdown and one interception; Young added 54 passing yards. Hebron carried 13 times for 61 yards, while Richardson caught five passes for 72 yards and a touchdown.

The Hokies recorded three tackles for loss and no sacks. Bobby Martin led Tech with 11 tackles, and Scott Hill added 10. Kirk Alexander recovered Virginia's only lost fumble. The loss dropped Virginia Tech to 5–4–1 entering the season finale.

=== NC State ===
Team	1	2	3	4	Total
• Virginia Tech	0	14	8	3	25
NC State	10	6	0	7	23

- Date: November 18
- Location: Carter–Finley Stadium, Raleigh, NC
- Game start: 1:00 p.m. EST
- Elapsed time: 2:55
- Game attendance: 43,100
- Game weather: Mostly sunny, 53 °F (12 °C), Winds WNW 10 mph (16 km/h)
Box Score

A defensive touchdown helped Virginia Tech erase an early 10-point deficit and defeat NC State 25–23 on November 18, 1989, at Carter–Finley Stadium. The Hokies took their first lead on Roger Brown's interception return, regained the advantage in the third quarter and held on after NC State scored with 1:04 remaining.

NC State led 10–0 before Kennedy scored on a 3-yard run. Brown then returned an interception 55 yards for a touchdown to put Tech ahead 14–10. Two Damon Hartman field goals gave NC State a 16–14 halftime lead, but Fox scored on a 2-yard run and Mickel completed the two-point conversion pass to put Tech ahead 22–16. Thomas' 29-yard field goal extended the advantage before Chris Corders' second touchdown reception cut the final margin to two.

Virginia Tech outgained NC State 287–282. Wooten completed 9 of 16 passes for 146 yards with one interception. Hebron led the Hokies with 53 rushing yards on 14 carries, while Mickel caught five passes for 94 yards. Tech possessed the ball for 31:44.

The Hokies recorded three tackles for loss and three individual sacks in the Virginia Tech season statistics. Sean Lucas led Tech with 12 tackles. Chamblee recorded two sacks and a tackle for loss, while Darwin Herdman added a sack. Brown intercepted two passes, and Bryan Campbell and Jerome Preston recovered NC State fumbles. The victory gave Beamer his first winning season at Virginia Tech and completed a 6–4–1 campaign.
