= 1989 Akron Zips football team =

American college football season

1989 Akron Zips football
- Conference: Independent
- Record: 6–4–1
- Head coach: Gerry Faust (4th season)
- Defensive coordinator: Bob Junko (2nd season)
- Home stadium: Rubber Bowl

1989 NCAA Division I-A independents football records
	Conf.			Overall
Team	W	L	T	W		L		T
No. 1 Miami (FL)		–		11	–	1	–	0
No. 2 Notre Dame		–		12	–	1	–	0
No. 3 Florida State		–		10	–	2	–	0
Northern Illinois		–		9	–	2	–	0
No. 15 Penn State		–		8	–	3	–	1
No. 17 Pittsburgh		–		8	–	3	–	1
No. 21 West Virginia		–		8	–	3	–	1
Syracuse		–		8	–	4	–	0
Southwestern Louisiana		–		7	–	4	–	0
Akron		–		6	–	4	–	1
South Carolina		–		6	–	4	–	1
Virginia Tech		–		6	–	4	–	1
Louisiana Tech		–		5	–	4	–	1
Army		–		6	–	5	–	0
Louisville		–		6	–	5	–	0
East Carolina		–		5	–	5	–	1
Tulsa		–		6	–	6	–	0
Southern Miss		–		5	–	6	–	0
Tulane		–		4	–	8	–	0
Navy		–		3	–	8	–	0
Rutgers		–		2	–	7	–	2
Boston College		–		2	–	9	–	0
Memphis State		–		2	–	9	–	0
Cincinnati		–		1	–	9	–	1
Temple		–		1	–	10	–	0
Rankings from AP Poll

The 1989 Akron Zips football team represented Akron University in the 1989 NCAA Division I-A football season as Division I-A independents. They were led by fourth-year head coach Gerry Faust. The Zips played their home games at the Rubber Bowl in Akron, Ohio. They finished the season with a record of 6–4–1.

== Schedule ==
Date	Opponent	Site	Result	Attendance	Source
September 2	at Virginia Tech	Lane Stadium; Blacksburg, VA	L 3–29	28,371	
September 9	Kent State	Rubber Bowl; Akron, OH (Wagon Wheel)	W 40–7	35,189	
September 16	at Central Michigan	Kelly/Shorts Stadium; Mount Pleasant, MI	W 27–26	21,782	
September 23	at Youngstown State	Stambaugh Stadium; Youngstown, OH (Steel Tire)	L 17–20		
September 30	at Bowling Green	Doyt Perry Stadium; Bowling Green, OH	W 38–24	25,057	
October 7	Louisiana Tech	Rubber Bowl; Akron, OH	W 31–24	13,107	
October 14	at No. 20 (I-AA) Eastern Illinois	O'Brien Field; Charleston, IL	L 17–21		
October 21	at No. 17 (I-AA) Murray State	Roy Stewart Stadium; Murray, KY	T 31–31	5,390	
October 28	Cincinnati	Rubber Bowl; Akron, OH	W 31–0	7,747	
November 4	Northern Arizona	Rubber Bowl; Akron, OH	W 52–7	23,419	
November 11	at No. 11 Tennessee	Neyland Stadium; Knoxville, TN	L 9–52	91,833	
Rankings from AP Poll released prior to the game
