= 1989 Syracuse Orangemen football team =

American college football season

1989 Syracuse Orangemen football

Peach Bowl champion

Peach Bowl, W 19–18 vs. Georgia
- Conference: Independent
- Record: 8–4
- Head coach: Dick MacPherson (9th season)
- Offensive coordinator: George DeLeone (3rd season)
- Captains: Blake Bednarz; Dan Bucey; Rob Burnett; Michael Owens; Terry Wooden
- Home stadium: Carrier Dome

1989 Major eastern college football independents records
	Conf.					Overall
Team	W		L		T	W		L		T
No. 15 Penn State $	6	–	0	–	0	8	–	3	–	1
No. 17 Pittsburgh	4	–	1	–	1	8	–	3	–	1
No. 21 West Virginia	3	–	1	–	1	8	–	3	–	1
Syracuse	3	–	3	–	0	8	–	4	–	0
Temple	1	–	4	–	0	1	–	10	–	0
Rutgers	1	–	5	–	0	2	–	7	–	2
Boston College	1	–	5	–	0	2	–	9	–	0
$ – Lambert Trophy Winner; Rankings from AP Poll

1989 NCAA Division I-A independents football records
	Conf.			Overall
Team	W	L	T	W		L		T
No. 1 Miami (FL)		–		11	–	1	–	0
No. 2 Notre Dame		–		12	–	1	–	0
No. 3 Florida State		–		10	–	2	–	0
Northern Illinois		–		9	–	2	–	0
No. 15 Penn State		–		8	–	3	–	1
No. 17 Pittsburgh		–		8	–	3	–	1
No. 21 West Virginia		–		8	–	3	–	1
Syracuse		–		8	–	4	–	0
Southwestern Louisiana		–		7	–	4	–	0
Akron		–		6	–	4	–	1
South Carolina		–		6	–	4	–	1
Virginia Tech		–		6	–	4	–	1
Louisiana Tech		–		5	–	4	–	1
Army		–		6	–	5	–	0
Louisville		–		6	–	5	–	0
East Carolina		–		5	–	5	–	1
Tulsa		–		6	–	6	–	0
Southern Miss		–		5	–	6	–	0
Tulane		–		4	–	8	–	0
Navy		–		3	–	8	–	0
Rutgers		–		2	–	7	–	2
Boston College		–		2	–	9	–	0
Memphis State		–		2	–	9	–	0
Cincinnati		–		1	–	9	–	1
Temple		–		1	–	10	–	0
Rankings from AP Poll

The 1989 Syracuse Orangemen football team represented Syracuse University as an independent during the 1989 NCAA Division I-A football season. Led by ninth-year head coach Dick MacPherson, the Orangemen compiled a record of 8–4. Syracuse was invited to the Peach Bowl, where the Orangemen defeated Georgia. The team also played its final regular season game in Tokyo, at the Coca-Cola Classic against Louisville. Syracuse played home games at the Carrier Dome in Syracuse, New York.

== Schedule ==
Date	Opponent	Rank	Site	TV	Result	Attendance	Source
September 9	at Temple	No. 14	Veterans Stadium; Philadelphia, PA		W 43–3	20,150	
September 16	Army	No. 11	Carrier Dome; Syracuse, NY		W 10–7	48,331	
September 23	at No. 13 Pittsburgh	No. 10	Pitt Stadium; Pittsburgh, PA (rivalry)		L 23–30	45,762	
October 7	No. 22 Florida State	No. 17	Carrier Dome; Syracuse, NY		L 10–41	49,832	
October 14	No. 23 Penn State		Carrier Dome; Syracuse, NY (rivalry)		L 12–34	49,876	
October 21	at Rutgers		Rutgers Stadium; Piscataway, NJ		W 49–28	29,276	
October 28	East Carolina		Carrier Dome; Syracuse, NY		W 18–16	48,731	
November 4	Boston College		Carrier Dome; Syracuse, NY		W 23–11	49,781	
November 11	at Navy		Navy–Marine Corps Memorial Stadium; Annapolis, MD		W 38–17	29,032	
November 23	No. 17 West Virginia		Carrier Dome; Syracuse, NY (rivalry)		L 17–24	46,757	
December 4	vs. Louisville		Tokyo Dome; Tokyo, Japan (Coca-Cola Classic)		W 24–13	50,000	
December 30	vs. Georgia		Atlanta–Fulton County Stadium; Atlanta, GA (Peach Bowl)	ABC	W 19–18	44,911	
Rankings from AP Poll released prior to the game

== Roster ==
1989 Syracuse Orangemen football team roster
Players
Coaches
Offense

Pos.	#	Name	Class
WR	7	Rob Carpenter	So
C	71	Dan Erickson	Jr
WR	14	Rob Moore	Jr
C	53	John Flannery	Jr
TE	84	Chris Gedney	Fr
QB	19	Bill Scharr	Sr
RB	33	David Walker	Fr
RB	44	Michael Owens	Sr
FB	43	Duane Kinnon	Jr

Defense

Pos.	#	Name	Class
DE	70	Rob Burnett	Sr
LB	52	Glen Young	Fr
LOLB	90	Terry Wooden	Sr
ROLB	34	Alban Brown	Sr
ILB	59	David Bavaro	Sr
ILB	55	Dan Bucey	Sr

Special teams

Pos.	#	Name	Class
KR	45	Qadry Ismail	Fr
P	3	Ken Hawkins	So
K	1	John Biskup	Fr

Head coach

- Dick MacPherson

Coordinators/assistant coaches

{{{asst_coach}}}

Legend

- (C) Team captain
- (S) Suspended
- (I) Ineligible
- Injured
- Redshirt
