= 1989 Memphis State Tigers football team =

American college football season

1989 Memphis State Tigers football
- Conference: Independent
- Record: 2–9
- Head coach: Chuck Stobart (1st season)
- Offensive coordinator: Darrell Dickey (2nd season)
- Defensive coordinator: Pete Kuharchek (3rd season)
- Home stadium: Liberty Bowl Memorial Stadium

1989 NCAA Division I-A independents football records
	Conf.			Overall
Team	W	L	T	W		L		T
No. 1 Miami (FL)		–		11	–	1	–	0
No. 2 Notre Dame		–		12	–	1	–	0
No. 3 Florida State		–		10	–	2	–	0
Northern Illinois		–		9	–	2	–	0
No. 15 Penn State		–		8	–	3	–	1
No. 17 Pittsburgh		–		8	–	3	–	1
No. 21 West Virginia		–		8	–	3	–	1
Syracuse		–		8	–	4	–	0
Southwestern Louisiana		–		7	–	4	–	0
Akron		–		6	–	4	–	1
South Carolina		–		6	–	4	–	1
Virginia Tech		–		6	–	4	–	1
Louisiana Tech		–		5	–	4	–	1
Army		–		6	–	5	–	0
Louisville		–		6	–	5	–	0
East Carolina		–		5	–	5	–	1
Tulsa		–		6	–	6	–	0
Southern Miss		–		5	–	6	–	0
Tulane		–		4	–	8	–	0
Navy		–		3	–	8	–	0
Rutgers		–		2	–	7	–	2
Boston College		–		2	–	9	–	0
Memphis State		–		2	–	9	–	0
Cincinnati		–		1	–	9	–	1
Temple		–		1	–	10	–	0
Rankings from AP Poll

The 1989 Memphis State Tigers football team represented Memphis State University (now known as the University of Memphis) as an independent in the 1989 NCAA Division I-A football season. The team was led by fifth-year head coach Chuck Stobart and played home games at the Liberty Bowl Memorial Stadium in Memphis, Tennessee.

== Schedule ==
Date	Opponent	Site	Result	Attendance	Source
September 2	Ole Miss	Liberty Bowl Memorial Stadium; Memphis, TN (rivalry)	L 13-20	59,795	
September 9	Arkansas State	Liberty Bowl Memorial Stadium; Memphis, TN (Paint Bucket Bowl)	L 13–17	30,794	
September 16	at No. 16 Alabama	Legion Field; Birmingham, AL	L 7–35	75,962	
September 23	Florida	Liberty Bowl Memorial Stadium; Memphis, TN	L 13–38	25,163	
October 7	Vanderbilt^{†}	Liberty Bowl Memorial Stadium; Memphis, TN	W 13–10	26,345	
October 14	at Cincinnati	Nippert Stadium; Cincinnati, OH (rivalry)	W 34–17	18,632	
October 21	at Mississippi State	Scott Field; Starkville, MS	L 10–35	37,192	
October 28	Southern Miss	Liberty Bowl Memorial Stadium; Memphis, TN (Black and Blue Bowl)	L 7–31	18,572	
November 4	at Tulane	Louisiana Superdome; New Orleans, LA	L 34–38	24,861	
November 11	Louisville	Liberty Bowl Memorial Stadium; Memphis, TN (rivalry)	L 10–40	14,003	
November 18	at No. 5 Florida State	Doak Campbell Stadium; Tallahassee, FL	L 20–57	57,511	
^{†}Homecoming; Rankings from AP Poll released prior to the game
