= 1989 Navy Midshipmen football team =

American college football season

1989 Navy Midshipmen football
- Conference: Independent
- Record: 3–8
- Head coach: Elliott Uzelac (3rd season)
- Defensive coordinator: Carl Reese (1st season)
- MVP: David Lowe
- Captains: James Bradley; Bob Weissenfels
- Home stadium: Navy–Marine Corps Memorial Stadium

1989 NCAA Division I-A independents football records
	Conf.			Overall
Team	W	L	T	W		L		T
No. 1 Miami (FL)		–		11	–	1	–	0
No. 2 Notre Dame		–		12	–	1	–	0
No. 3 Florida State		–		10	–	2	–	0
Northern Illinois		–		9	–	2	–	0
No. 15 Penn State		–		8	–	3	–	1
No. 17 Pittsburgh		–		8	–	3	–	1
No. 21 West Virginia		–		8	–	3	–	1
Syracuse		–		8	–	4	–	0
Southwestern Louisiana		–		7	–	4	–	0
Akron		–		6	–	4	–	1
South Carolina		–		6	–	4	–	1
Virginia Tech		–		6	–	4	–	1
Louisiana Tech		–		5	–	4	–	1
Army		–		6	–	5	–	0
Louisville		–		6	–	5	–	0
East Carolina		–		5	–	5	–	1
Tulsa		–		6	–	6	–	0
Southern Miss		–		5	–	6	–	0
Tulane		–		4	–	8	–	0
Navy		–		3	–	8	–	0
Rutgers		–		2	–	7	–	2
Boston College		–		2	–	9	–	0
Memphis State		–		2	–	9	–	0
Cincinnati		–		1	–	9	–	1
Temple		–		1	–	10	–	0
Rankings from AP Poll

The 1989 Navy Midshipmen football team represented the United States Naval Academy (USNA) as an independent during the 1989 NCAA Division I-A football season. The team was led by third-year head coach Elliott Uzelac.

== Schedule ==
Date	Opponent	Site	TV	Result	Attendance	Source
September 16	BYU	Navy–Marine Corps Memorial Stadium; Annapolis, MD		L 10–31	26,884	
September 23	No. T–11 The Citadel	Navy–Marine Corps Memorial Stadium; Annapolis, MD		L 10–14	20,057	
September 30	at North Carolina	Kenan Memorial Stadium; Chapel Hill, NC		W 12–7	38,000	
October 7	Air Force	Navy–Marine Corps Memorial Stadium; Annapolis, MD (Commander-in-Chief's Trophy)		L 7–35	35,632	
October 14	at Pittsburgh	Pitt Stadium; Pittsburgh, PA		L 14–31	50,467	
October 21	at Boston College	Alumni Stadium; Chestnut Hill, MA		W 27–24	32,000	
October 28	James Madison^{†}	Navy–Marine Corps Memorial Stadium; Annapolis, MD		L 20–24	30,024	
November 4	at Notre Dame	Notre Dame Stadium; Notre Dame, IN (rivalry)	SportsChannel	L 0–41	59,075	
November 11	Syracuse	Navy–Marine Corps Memorial Stadium; Annapolis, MD		L 17–38	29,032	
November 18	at Delaware	Delaware Stadium; Newark, DE		L 9–10	20,492	
December 9	vs. Army	Giants Stadium; East Rutherford, NJ (Army–Navy Game)	CBS	W 19–17	75,721	
^{†}Homecoming; Rankings from NCAA Division I-AA Football Committee Poll released prior to the game

== Game summaries ==
=== BYU ===
BYU Cougars (1–1) at Navy Midshipmen (0–0)

Quarter	1	2	3	4	Total
BYU	7	7	3	14	31
Navy	7	3	0	0	10

at Navy–Marine Corps Memorial Stadium, Annapolis, Maryland

- Date: September 16, 1989
- Game weather: Overcast, 67 °F (19 °C)
- Game attendance: 2,684
- Box Score

Team	Category	Player	Statistics
BYU	Passing	Ty Detmer	26/35, 353 Yds, 2 TD
BYU	Rushing	Matt Bellini	11 Rush, 50 Yds, 2 TD
BYU	Receiving	Fred Whittingham	5 Rec, 80 Yds
Navy	Passing	Alton Grizzard	8/14, 87 Yds
Navy	Rushing	Rodney Purifoy	15 Rush, 67 Yds, TD
Navy	Receiving	Stanley Smith	2 Rec, 27 Yds

Scoring summary

Quarter	Time	Drive			Team	Scoring information	Score	
Quarter	Time	Plays	Yards	TOP	Team	Scoring information	BYU	NAVY
1					Navy	Rodney Purifoy 1-yard touchdown run, Frank Schenk kick good	0	7
1					BYU	Matt Bellini 17-yard touchdown reception from Ty Detmer, Jason Chaffetz kick good	7	7
2					BYU	Matt Bellini 3-yard touchdown run, Jason Chaffetz kick good	14	7
2					Navy	22-yard field goal by Frank Schenk	14	10
3					BYU	24-yard field goal by Jason Chaffetz	17	10
4					BYU	Matt Bellini 20-yard touchdown reception from Ty Detmer, Jason Chaffetz kick good	24	10
4					BYU	Matt Bellini 10-yard touchdown run, Jason Chaffetz kick good	31	10
"TOP" = time of possession. For other American football terms, see Glossary of American football.							31	10

=== At Notre Dame ===
Navy Midshipmen (2–5) at #1 Notre Dame Fighting Irish (8–0)

Quarter	1	2	3	4	Total
Navy	0	0	0	0	0
Notre Dame	14	10	3	14	41

at Notre Dame Stadium, South Bend, Indiana

- Date: November 4, 1989
- Game attendance: 59,075
- Recap/Box Score

Game information

First quarter

- ND – Tony Rice 6-yard run (Craig Hentrich kick), 11:49. Notre Dame 7–0. Drive: 64 yards.
- ND – Rodney Culver 11-yard run (Craig Hentrich kick), 3:18. Notre Dame 14–0. Drive: 64 yards.

Second quarter

- ND – Ricky Watters 48-yard run (Craig Hentrich kick), 8:36. Notre Dame 21–0.
- ND – Billy Hackett 27-yard field goal, 0:16. Notre Dame 24–0. Drive: 14 plays, 50 yards.

Third quarter

- ND – Billy Hackett 39-yard field goal, 11:58. Notre Dame 27–0.

Fourth quarter

- ND – Dorsey Levens 2-yard run (Craig Hentrich kick), 14:38. Notre Dame 34–0.
- ND – Ted McNamara 1-yard run (Craig Hentrich kick), 4:40. Notre Dame 41–0.

Top passers

- NAVY – Alton Grizzard – 8/14, 94 yards
- ND – Rick Mirer – 8/12, 64 yards

Top rushers

- NAVY – Rodney Purifoy – 11 rushes, 50 yards
- ND – Ricky Watters – 9 rushes, 134 yards, TD

Top receivers

- NAVY – Shane Smith – 3 receptions, 50 yards
- ND – Adrian Jarrell – 3 receptins, 28 yards

External videos
- Full game

=== vs Army ===
Army Cadets vs. Navy Midshipmen

Quarter	1	2	3	4	Total
Navy	9	0	7	3	19
Army	0	14	3	0	17

at Giants Stadium • East Rutherford, New Jersey

- Date: December 9
- Game attendance: 75,721
- TV announcers (CBS): Jim Nantz, Pat Haden, and John Dockery
- NY Times

Scoring summary

Quarter	Time	Drive			Team	Scoring information	Score	
Quarter	Time	Plays	Yards	TOP	Team	Scoring information	NAVY	ARMY
1					Navy	Mason 54-yard touchdown reception from Alton Grizzard, Fred Schenk kick no good	6	0
1					Navy	38-yard field goal by Fred Schenk	9	0
2					Army	Calvin Cass 1-yard touchdown run, kick good	9	7
2					Army	Calvin Cass 1-yard touchdown run, kick good	9	14
3					Navy	Purifoy 3-yard touchdown run, Fred Schenk kick good	16	14
3					Army	22-yard field goal by Havenstrite	16	17
4	0:11		63		Navy	32-yard field goal by Fred Schenk	19	17
"TOP" = time of possession. For other American football terms, see Glossary of American football.							19	17

External videos
- Fred Schenk game-winning FG/postgame

== Roster ==
1989 Navy Midshipmen football team roster
Players
Coaches
Offense

Pos.	#	Name	Class
TE		Dave Berghult
OL		Dan Bishop
RB		James Bradley
RB		Ken Brown
FB		Mike Burns	Sr
TE		Alex Chalmers
G		Michael Davis	So
WR	80	Jerry Dawson	Jr
FB	36	Don Ferraro	So
OL		Bob Friedman
QB	16	Alton Grizzard	Jr
OL		Greg Hlatky
RB		Aaron Johnson
OL		Mike Kircher
OL		Mike Maier
QB		B.J. Mason
QB		Gary McIntosh
FB		Kwame Moultrie	Fr
WR		Jon Neumann	Jr
RB		Rodney Purifoy
RB		Deric Sims
WR		Shane Smith
OL		Carl Voss

Defense

Pos.	#	Name	Class
LB		Bill Bowling
DB		Rodney Brown
S		Scott Carson	Jr
DB		Chris Cordero
LB		Anthony Domino
DL		Chris Jenke
DL		Andy Kirkland
DB		Bart LaRocca
LB		Beau Laskey
LB		David Lowe
DL		Greg Reppar
CB		Steve Tazza	Sr
S		Bob Weissenfels
DB		Bill Yancey

Special teams

Pos.	#	Name	Class
P		Tom Frosch
K	1	Fred Schenk
P		Jefferson Triplett

Head coach

- Elliot Uzelac

Coordinators/assistant coaches

Legend

- (C) Team captain
- (S) Suspended
- (I) Ineligible
- Injured
- Redshirt
