= 1989 Penn State Nittany Lions football team =

American college football season

1989 Penn State Nittany Lions football

Eastern champion Holiday Bowl champion

Holiday Bowl, W 50–39 vs. BYU
- Conference: Independent

Ranking
- Coaches: No. 14
- AP: No. 15
- Record: 8–3–1
- Head coach: Joe Paterno (24th season)
- Offensive coordinator: Fran Ganter (6th season)
- Offensive scheme: Pro-style
- Defensive coordinator: Jerry Sandusky (13th season)
- Base defense: 4–3
- Captains: Brian Chizmar; Andre Collins; Blair Thomas
- Home stadium: Beaver Stadium

1989 Major eastern college football independents records
	Conf.					Overall
Team	W		L		T	W		L		T
No. 15 Penn State $	6	–	0	–	0	8	–	3	–	1
No. 17 Pittsburgh	4	–	1	–	1	8	–	3	–	1
No. 21 West Virginia	3	–	1	–	1	8	–	3	–	1
Syracuse	3	–	3	–	0	8	–	4	–	0
Temple	1	–	4	–	0	1	–	10	–	0
Rutgers	1	–	5	–	0	2	–	7	–	2
Boston College	1	–	5	–	0	2	–	9	–	0
$ – Lambert Trophy Winner; Rankings from AP Poll

1989 NCAA Division I-A independents football records
	Conf.			Overall
Team	W	L	T	W		L		T
No. 1 Miami (FL)		–		11	–	1	–	0
No. 2 Notre Dame		–		12	–	1	–	0
No. 3 Florida State		–		10	–	2	–	0
Northern Illinois		–		9	–	2	–	0
No. 15 Penn State		–		8	–	3	–	1
No. 17 Pittsburgh		–		8	–	3	–	1
No. 21 West Virginia		–		8	–	3	–	1
Syracuse		–		8	–	4	–	0
Southwestern Louisiana		–		7	–	4	–	0
Akron		–		6	–	4	–	1
South Carolina		–		6	–	4	–	1
Virginia Tech		–		6	–	4	–	1
Louisiana Tech		–		5	–	4	–	1
Army		–		6	–	5	–	0
Louisville		–		6	–	5	–	0
East Carolina		–		5	–	5	–	1
Tulsa		–		6	–	6	–	0
Southern Miss		–		5	–	6	–	0
Tulane		–		4	–	8	–	0
Navy		–		3	–	8	–	0
Rutgers		–		2	–	7	–	2
Boston College		–		2	–	9	–	0
Memphis State		–		2	–	9	–	0
Cincinnati		–		1	–	9	–	1
Temple		–		1	–	10	–	0
Rankings from AP Poll

The 1989 Penn State Nittany Lions football team represented the Pennsylvania State University as an independent during the 1989 NCAA Division I-A football season. Led by 24th-year head coach Joe Paterno, the Nittany Lions compiled a record of 8–3–1. Penn State was invited to the Holiday Bowl, where the Nittany Lions defeated BYU. The team played home games at Beaver Stadium in University Park, Pennsylvania.

== Schedule ==
Date	Time	Opponent	Rank	Site	TV	Result	Attendance	Source
September 9	1:00 p.m.	Virginia	No. 12	Beaver Stadium; University Park, PA		L 6–14	85,956	
September 16	1:00 p.m.	Temple		Beaver Stadium; University Park, PA		W 42–3	78,000	
September 23	1:00 p.m.	Boston College		Beaver Stadium; University Park, PA		W 7–3	85,651	
September 30	8:00 p.m.	at Texas		Texas Memorial Stadium; Austin, TX		W 16–12	75,232	
October 7	1:00 p.m.	at Rutgers		Giants Stadium; East Rutherford, NJ		W 17–0	52,688	
October 14	4:00 p.m.	at Syracuse	No. 23	Carrier Dome; Syracuse, NY (rivalry)	ESPN	W 34–12	49,876	
October 28	2:30 p.m.	No. 6 Alabama	No. 14	Beaver Stadium; University Park, PA (rivalry)	CBS	L 16–17	85,975	
November 4	4:00 p.m.	No. 13 West Virginia^{†}	No. 16	Beaver Stadium; University Park, PA (rivalry)	ESPN	W 19–9	85,911	
November 11	1:00 p.m.	at Maryland	No. 13	Memorial Stadium; Baltimore, MD (rivalry)		T 13–13	61,215	
November 18	2:30 p.m.	No. 1 Notre Dame	No. 17	Beaver Stadium; University Park, PA (rivalry)	CBS	L 23–34	86,025	
November 25	12:00 p.m.	at No. 19 Pittsburgh	No. 22	Pitt Stadium; Pittsburgh, PA (rivalry)	CBS	W 16–13	57,158	
December 29	8:00 p.m.	vs. No. 19 BYU	No. 18	Jack Murphy Stadium; San Diego, CA (Holiday Bowl)	ESPN	W 50–39	61,113	
^{†}Homecoming; Rankings from AP Poll released prior to the game; All times are in Eastern time

== Game summaries ==
=== Notre Dame ===
#1 Notre Dame Fighting Irish (10–0) at #17 Penn State Nittany Lions (6–2–1)

Quarter	1	2	3	4	Total
Notre Dame	7	14	7	6	34
Penn St	7	3	7	6	23

at Beaver Stadium, State College, Pennsylvania

- Date: November 18, 1989
- Game time: 2:30 p.m.
- Game attendance: 86,025
- TV: CBS
- Recap/Box

Game information

First quarter

- PSU – Blair Thomas 2-yard run (Ray Tarasi kick), 8:04. Penn St 7–0. Drive: 79 yards.
- ND – Tony Rice 5-yard run (Craig Hentrich kick), 2:19. Tie 7–7. Drive: 13 plays, 65 yards.

Second quarter

- PSU – Ray Tarasi 38-yard field goal, 13:46. Penn St 10–7.
- ND – Ricky Watters 12-yard run (Craig Hentrich kick), 11:35. Notre Dame 14–10. Drive: 6 plays, 58 yards.
- ND – Anthony Johnson 1-yard run (Craig Hentrich kick), 5:27. Notre Dame 21–10.

Third quarter

- ND – Tony Rice 1-yard run (Craig Hentrich kick), 8:42. Notre Dame 28–10. Drive: 6 plays.
- PSU – Blair Thomas 3-yard run (Ray Tarasi kick), 4:49. Notre Dame 28–17. Drive: 79 yards.

Fourth quarter

- ND – Billy Hackett 22-yard field goal, 13:33. Notre Dame 31–17.
- ND – Billy Hackett 19-yard field goal, 6:53. Notre Dame 34–17.
- PSU – Terry Smith 5-yard pass from Tom Bill (run failed), 4:31. Notre Dame 34–23.

Top passers

- ND – Tony Rice – 5/10, 47 yards, INT
- PSU – Tom Bill – 6/14, 56 yards, TD

Top rushers

- ND – Tony Rice – 26 rushes, 141 yards, 2 TD
- PSU – Blair Thomas – 26 rushes, 133 yards, 2 TD

Top receivers

- ND – Raghib Ismail – 2 receptions, 27 yards
- PSU – O.J. McDuffie – 2 receptions, 37 yards

External videos
- Full game (part 1)
- Full game (part 2)
- Full game (part 3)
- Game highlights

== Personnel ==
1989 Penn State Nittany Lions football team roster
Players
Coaches
Offense

Pos.	#	Name	Class
RB	20	Richie Anderson	Fr
QB	12	Tom Bill	Jr
FB	27	Gary Brown	Jr
RB	23	Gerry Collins
WR	26	David Daniels	Jr
C	78	Roger Duffy	Sr
OL	71	Tim Freeman	Sr
FB	11	Sam Gash	So
RB	34	John Gerak	So
TE	89	Al Golden	So
TE	86	David Jakob	Sr
OL	57	Sean Love	Sr
OL		Matt McCartin
WR	24	O.J. McDuffie	So
OL	60	Ed Monaghan	Sr
QB	14	Matt Nardolillo	Fr
RB	29	Brian O'Neal	Fr
WR		Rich Rosa
QB	19	Tony Sacca	So
C		E. J. Sandusky	So
OT	76	Paul Siever	Jr
WR	8	Terry Smith	So
G	79	Dave Szott	Sr
RB	32	Blair Thomas	Sr
RB	44	Leroy Thompson	Jr
TE	80	Todd Young	Sr

Defense

Pos.	#	Name	Class
DB	13	Matt Baggott	So
DL	67	Todd Burger	Fr
LB	48	Brian Chizmar	So
LB	31	Andre Collins	Sr
LB	38	Mark D'Onofrio	So
DL	72	Jim Deter	So
DT	85	Frank Giannetti	Jr
LB	58	Reggie Givens	Fr
LB	42	Keith Goganious	So
DB	40	Hernon Henderson	Jr
DB	6	Leonard Humphries	So
LB		Geoff Lapchen
S	9	Darren Perry	So
DB	36	Sherrod Rainge	Sr
DL	75	Rich Schonewolf	Sr
DB	25	Willie Thomas	Jr

Special teams

Pos.	#	Name	Class
P	4	Doug Helkowski	Sr
K		Ray Tarasi

Head coach

- Joe Paterno

Coordinators/assistant coaches

- Fran Ganter (OC)
- Jerry Sandusky (DC)

Legend

- (C) Team captain
- (S) Suspended
- (I) Ineligible
- Injured
- Redshirt

Roster

== NFL draft ==
Four Nittany Lions were drafted in the 1990 NFL draft.

Round	Pick	Overall	Name	Position	Team
1st	2	2	Blair Thomas	Running back	New York Jets
2nd	21	46	Andre Collins	Linebacker	Washington Redskins
7th	15	180	David Szott	Offensive guard	Kansas City Chiefs
8th	3	196	Roger Duffy	Offensive guard	New York Jets
