= 1989 Southwestern Louisiana Ragin' Cajuns football team =

American college football season

1989 Southwestern Louisiana Ragin' Cajuns football
- Conference: Independent
- Record: 7–4
- Head coach: Nelson Stokley (4th season)
- Home stadium: Cajun Field

1989 NCAA Division I-A independents football records
	Conf.			Overall
Team	W	L	T	W		L		T
No. 1 Miami (FL)		–		11	–	1	–	0
No. 2 Notre Dame		–		12	–	1	–	0
No. 3 Florida State		–		10	–	2	–	0
Northern Illinois		–		9	–	2	–	0
No. 15 Penn State		–		8	–	3	–	1
No. 17 Pittsburgh		–		8	–	3	–	1
No. 21 West Virginia		–		8	–	3	–	1
Syracuse		–		8	–	4	–	0
Southwestern Louisiana		–		7	–	4	–	0
Akron		–		6	–	4	–	1
South Carolina		–		6	–	4	–	1
Virginia Tech		–		6	–	4	–	1
Louisiana Tech		–		5	–	4	–	1
Army		–		6	–	5	–	0
Louisville		–		6	–	5	–	0
East Carolina		–		5	–	5	–	1
Tulsa		–		6	–	6	–	0
Southern Miss		–		5	–	6	–	0
Tulane		–		4	–	8	–	0
Navy		–		3	–	8	–	0
Rutgers		–		2	–	7	–	2
Boston College		–		2	–	9	–	0
Memphis State		–		2	–	9	–	0
Cincinnati		–		1	–	9	–	1
Temple		–		1	–	10	–	0
Rankings from AP Poll

The 1989 Southwestern Louisiana Ragin' Cajuns football team was an American football team that represented the University of Southwestern Louisiana (now known as the University of Louisiana at Lafayette) as an independent during the 1989 NCAA Division I-A football season. In their fourth year under head coach Nelson Stokley, the team compiled a 7–4 record.

== Schedule ==
Date	Opponent	Site	Result	Attendance	Source
September 2	Louisiana Tech	Cajun Field; Lafayette, LA (rivalry)	L 14–40	20,200	
September 9	Central Michigan	Cajun Field; Lafayette, LA	W 22–20	12,151	
September 16	at Tulane	Louisiana Superdome; New Orleans, LA	L 10–17	28,144	
September 23	at Rice	Rice Stadium; Houston, TX	W 18–3	15,200	
September 30	at Northeast Louisiana	Malone Stadium; Monroe, LA (rivalry)	W 24–10		
October 7	Tulsa	Cajun Field; Lafayette, LA	W 21–13	20,263	
October 14	at No. 11 Alabama	Bryant–Denny Stadium; Tuscaloosa, AL	L 17–24	70,123	
October 24	at Southern Miss	M. M. Roberts Stadium; Hattiesburg, MS	W 24–21		
November 4	at Northern Illinois	Huskie Stadium; DeKalb, IL	L 20–23	5,604	
November 11	Lamar	Cajun Field; Lafayette, LA (Sabine Shoe)	W 42–33		
November 18	Arkansas State	Cajun Field; Lafayette, LA	W 29–28	12,231	
Rankings from AP Poll released prior to the game

== Roster ==
1989 Southwestern Louisiana Ragin' Cajuns football team roster
Players			Coaches
Offense: Pos. / # / Name / Class; QB / 1 / Brian Mitchell / Sr	Defense: Pos. / # / Name / Class	Special teams: Pos. / # / Name / Class	Head coach: Nelson Stokley; Coordinators/assistant coaches Legend: (C) Team captain; (S) Suspended; (I) Ineligible; Injured; Redshirt
