= Terry Anthony =

American football player (born 1968)

No. 85
- Position: Wide receiver

Personal information
- Born: March 9, 1968 (age 58); Daytona Beach, Florida, U.S.
- Listed height: 6 ft 0 in (1.83 m)
- Listed weight: 200 lb (91 kg)

Career information
- High school: Mainland (Daytona Beach, Florida)
- College: Florida State
- NFL draft: 1990: 11th round, 281st overall pick

Career history
- Tampa Bay Buccaneers (1990–1991)

Career NFL statistics
- Receptions: 4
- Receiving yards: 51
- Stats at Pro Football Reference

Terrence Anthony (born March 9, 1968) is an American former professional football player who was a wide receiver in the National Football League (NFL). He played two seasons for the Tampa Bay Buccaneers, after a college career at Florida State. He was selected by the Buccaneers in the 11th round of the 1991 NFL draft. At FSU, Anthony was one of the members of the football team's 'Fab Four Receiving Corp,' along with future Buccaneers teammate Lawrence Dawsey, former 49er and Packer Ronald Lewis and former Arena Football League receiver Bruce LaSane. He was a 1988 First Team All South-Independent selection

Anthony was injured in Week 16 of the 1991 NFL season, being carted off with a knee injury against the Chicago Bears at Soldier Field.
