= 1989 Northern Illinois Huskies football team =

American college football season

1989 Northern Illinois Huskies football
- Conference: Independent
- Record: 9–2
- Head coach: Jerry Pettibone (5th season)
- Offensive coordinator: Mike Summers (2nd season)
- Defensive coordinator: Tim McGuire (4th season)
- MVP: Ron Delisi
- Captains: Ron Delisi; Joe Gucwa
- Home stadium: Huskie Stadium

1989 NCAA Division I-A independents football records
	Conf.			Overall
Team	W	L	T	W		L		T
No. 1 Miami (FL)		–		11	–	1	–	0
No. 2 Notre Dame		–		12	–	1	–	0
No. 3 Florida State		–		10	–	2	–	0
Northern Illinois		–		9	–	2	–	0
No. 15 Penn State		–		8	–	3	–	1
No. 17 Pittsburgh		–		8	–	3	–	1
No. 21 West Virginia		–		8	–	3	–	1
Syracuse		–		8	–	4	–	0
Southwestern Louisiana		–		7	–	4	–	0
Akron		–		6	–	4	–	1
South Carolina		–		6	–	4	–	1
Virginia Tech		–		6	–	4	–	1
Louisiana Tech		–		5	–	4	–	1
Army		–		6	–	5	–	0
Louisville		–		6	–	5	–	0
East Carolina		–		5	–	5	–	1
Tulsa		–		6	–	6	–	0
Southern Miss		–		5	–	6	–	0
Tulane		–		4	–	8	–	0
Navy		–		3	–	8	–	0
Rutgers		–		2	–	7	–	2
Boston College		–		2	–	9	–	0
Memphis State		–		2	–	9	–	0
Cincinnati		–		1	–	9	–	1
Temple		–		1	–	10	–	0
Rankings from AP Poll

The 1989 Northern Illinois Huskies football team represented Northern Illinois University as an independent during the 1989 NCAA Division I-A football season. Led by fifth-year head coach Jerry Pettibone, the Huskies compiled a record of 9–2. Northern Illinois played home games at Huskie Stadium in DeKalb, Illinois.

== Schedule ==
Date	Time	Opponent	Site	TV	Result	Attendance	Source
September 2	6:30 pm	Cal State Fullerton*	Huskie Stadium; DeKalb, IL		W 26–17	8,235	
September 9	1:30 pm	at No. 4 Nebraska*	Memorial Stadium; Lincoln, NE		L 17–48	76,194	
September 23	1:10 pm	at Kansas State*	KSU Stadium; Manhattan, KS		W 37–20	20,256	
September 30	6:30 pm	Western Illinois*	Huskie Stadium; DeKalb, IL		W 34–27	22,365	
October 7	1:00 pm	Southern Illinois*^{†}	Huskie Stadium; DeKalb, IL	SCC	W 29–24	23,933	
October 14	2:00 pm	at Louisiana Tech	Joe Aillet Stadium; Ruston, LA		L 21–42	17,300	
October 21	1:00 pm	UNLV*	Huskie Stadium; DeKalb, IL		W 42–24	16,352	
October 28	12:00 pm	at Temple	Veterans Stadium; Philadelphia, PA		W 20–17	15,712	
November 4	1:00 pm	Southwestern Louisiana	Huskie Stadium; DeKalb, IL		W 23–20	5,604	
November 11	1:00 pm	Toledo*	Huskie Stadium; DeKalb, IL		W 39–27	5,971	
November 18	12:30 pm	at Cincinnati	Nippert Stadium; Cincinnati, OH		W 56–3	4,610	
*Non-conference game; ^{†}Homecoming; Rankings from AP Poll released prior to the game; All times are in Central time
