= Ron Lewis (wide receiver) =

American football player (born 1968)

No. 83, 85
- Position: Wide receiver

Personal information
- Born: March 25, 1968 (age 58); Jacksonville, Florida, U.S.
- Listed height: 5 ft 11 in (1.80 m)
- Listed weight: 192 lb (87 kg)

Career information
- High school: Jacksonville (FL) Raines
- College: Florida State
- NFL draft: 1990: 3rd round, 68th overall pick

Career history
- San Francisco 49ers (1990–1992); Green Bay Packers (1992-1994); Philadelphia Eagles (1995)*
- * Offseason or practice squad member only

Career NFL statistics
- Receptions: 27
- Receiving yards: 325
- Stats at Pro Football Reference

Ronald Alexander Lewis (born March 25, 1968) is an American former professional football player who was a wide receiver for four seasons for the San Francisco 49ers and Green Bay Packers in the National Football League (NFL). He graduated from William M. Raines High School in 1986 in Jacksonville, Florida. He was selected by the 49ers in the third round of the 1990 NFL draft with the 68th overall pick.
