= Newbill =

Newbill is a surname. Notable people with the surname include:

- D. J. Newbill (born 1992), American basketball player
- Ivano Newbill (born 1970), American basketball player
- Richard Newbill (born 1968), American football linebacker
