= 1989 BYU Cougars football team =

American college football season

1989 BYU Cougars football

WAC champion

Holiday Bowl, L 39–50 vs. Penn State
- Conference: Western Athletic Conference

Ranking
- Coaches: No. 18
- AP: No. 22
- Record: 10–3 (7–1 WAC)
- Head coach: LaVell Edwards (18th season)
- Offensive coordinator: Roger French (9th season)
- Offensive scheme: West Coast
- Defensive coordinator: Dick Felt (15th season)
- Base defense: 4–3
- Captain: Freddie Whittingham
- Home stadium: Cougar Stadium

1989 Western Athletic Conference football standings
	Conf.					Overall
Team	W		L		T	W		L		T
No. 22 BYU $	7	–	1	–	0	10	–	3	–	0
Air Force	5	–	1	–	1	8	–	4	–	1
Hawaii	5	–	2	–	1	9	–	3	–	1
Wyoming	5	–	3	–	0	5	–	6	–	0
San Diego State	4	–	3	–	0	6	–	5	–	1
Colorado State	4	–	3	–	0	5	–	5	–	1
Utah	2	–	6	–	0	4	–	8	–	0
UTEP	1	–	7	–	0	2	–	10	–	0
New Mexico	0	–	7	–	0	2	–	10	–	0
$ – Conference champion; Rankings from AP Poll

The 1989 BYU Cougars football team represented Brigham Young University as a member of the Western Athletic Conference (WAC) during the 1989 NCAA Division I-A football season. Led by 18th-year head coach LaVell Edwards, the Cougars compiled a record of 10–3 overall and 7–1 in conference play, winning the WAC title. BYU was invited to the Holiday Bowl, where the Cougars lost to Penn State.

== Schedule ==
Date	Opponent	Rank	Site	Result	Attendance	Source
September 2	at New Mexico	No. 19	University Stadium; Albuquerque, NM	W 24–3	27,045	
September 7	Washington State*	No. 24	Cougar Stadium; Provo, UT	L 41–46	65,030	
September 16	at Navy*		Navy–Marine Corps Memorial Stadium; Annapolis, MD	W 31–10	26,884	
September 30	at Utah State*		Romney Stadium; Logan, UT (rivalry)	W 37–10	26,906	
October 7	Wyoming		Cougar Stadium; Provo, UT	W 36–20	65,630	
October 14	at Colorado State	No. 25	Hughes Stadium; Fort Collins, CO	W 45–16	21,198	
October 21	UTEP	No. 21	Cougar Stadium; Provo, UT	W 49–24	65,528	
October 28	at Hawaii	No. 18	Aloha Stadium; Halawa, HI	L 14–56	50,000	
November 4	Oregon*	No. 23	Cougar Stadium; Provo, UT	W 45–41	63,865	
November 11	Air Force	No. 21	Cougar Stadium; Provo, UT	W 44–35	66,089	
November 18	Utah	No. 21	Cougar Stadium; Provo, UT (Holy War)	W 70–31	66,110	
November 25	at San Diego State	No. 21	Jack Murphy Stadium; San Diego, CA	W 48–27	28,868	
December 29	vs. No. 18 Penn State*	No. 19	Jack Murphy Stadium; San Diego, CA (Holiday Bowl)	L 39–50	61,113	
*Non-conference game; Rankings from AP Poll released prior to the game

== Game summaries ==
=== At Navy ===
BYU Cougars (1–1) at Navy Midshipmen (0–0)

Quarter	1	2	3	4	Total
BYU	7	7	3	14	31
Navy	7	3	0	0	10

at Navy–Marine Corps Memorial Stadium, Annapolis, Maryland

- Date: September 16, 1989
- Game weather: Overcast, 67 °F (19 °C)
- Game attendance: 2,684
- Box Score

External videos
- BYU highlights

Team	Category	Player	Statistics
BYU	Passing	Ty Detmer	26/35, 353 Yds, 2 TD
BYU	Rushing	Matt Bellini	11 Rush, 50 Yds, 2 TD
BYU	Receiving	Fred Whittingham	5 Rec, 80 Yds
Navy	Passing	Alton Grizzard	8/14, 87 Yds
Navy	Rushing	Rodney Purifoy	15 Rush, 67 Yds, TD
Navy	Receiving	Stanley Smith	2 Rec, 27 Yds

Scoring summary

Quarter	Time	Drive			Team	Scoring information	Score	
Quarter	Time	Plays	Yards	TOP	Team	Scoring information	BYU	NAVY
1					Navy	Rodney Purifoy 1-yard touchdown run, Frank Schenk kick good	0	7
1					BYU	Matt Bellini 17-yard touchdown reception from Ty Detmer, Jason Chaffetz kick good	7	7
2					BYU	Matt Bellini 3-yard touchdown run, Jason Chaffetz kick good	14	7
2					Navy	22-yard field goal by Frank Schenk	14	10
3					BYU	24-yard field goal by Jason Chaffetz	17	10
4					BYU	Matt Bellini 20-yard touchdown reception from Ty Detmer, Jason Chaffetz kick good	24	10
4					BYU	Matt Bellini 10-yard touchdown run, Jason Chaffetz kick good	31	10
"TOP" = time of possession. For other American football terms, see Glossary of American football.							31	10

=== At Hawaii ===
#18 BYU Cougars (6–1) at Hawaii Rainbow Warriors (5–2)

Quarter	1	2	3	4	Total
BYU	0	7	0	7	14
Hawaii	14	21	14	7	56

at Aloha Stadium, Halawa, Hawaii

- Date: October 28, 1989
- Game time: 7:30 p.m.
- Game weather: Fair, 77 °F (25 °C)
- Game attendance: 46,841
- Referee: Pat Sweeney
- Box Score, Box Score

Team	Category	Player	Statistics
BYU	Passing	Ty Detmer	24/35, 427 Yds, TD, 2 INT
BYU	Rushing	Matt Bellini	7 Rush, 11 Yds
BYU	Receiving	Matt Bellini	6 Rec, 140 Yds
Hawaii	Passing	Garrett Gabriel	22/29, 440 Yds, 4 TD
Hawaii	Rushing	Jamal Farmer	18 Rush, 54 Yds, 2 TD
Hawaii	Receiving	Chris Roscoe	8 Rec, 158 Yds, TD

Scoring summary

Quarter	Time	Drive			Team	Scoring information	Score	
Quarter	Time	Plays	Yards	TOP	Team	Scoring information	BYU	UH
1	11:21	10	80	3:39	Hawaii	Jamal Farmer 1-yard touchdown run, Jason Elam kick good	0	7
1	2:34	17	87	6:15	Hawaii	Chris Roscoe 8-yard touchdown reception from Garrett Gabriel, Jason Elam kick good	0	14
2	14:00	3	86	1:39	Hawaii	Jamal Farmer 83-yard touchdown reception from Garrett Gabriel, Jason Elam kick good	0	21
2	9:55	9	84	4:00	BYU	Matt Bellini 1-yard touchdown run, Jason Chaffetz kick good	7	21
2	8:09	4	77	1:39	Hawaii	Jeff Newman 45-yard touchdown reception from Garrett Gabriel, Jason Elam kick good	7	28
2	3:27	6	43	2:16	Hawaii	Jamal Farmer 1-yard touchdown run, Jason Elam kick good	7	35
3	10:26	6	80	2:53	Hawaii	Richard Stevenson 6-yard touchdown run, Jason Elam kick good	7	42
3	5:15	8	69	4:08	Hawaii	Jeff Sydner 5-yard touchdown run, Jason Elam kick good	7	49
4	14:55	7	61	3:43	Hawaii	Darrick Branch 22-yard touchdown reception from Garrett Gabriel, Jason Elam kick good	7	56
4	2:57	6	99	1:32	BYU	Jeff Frandsen 23-yard touchdown reception from Ty Detmer, Jason Chaffetz kick good	14	56
"TOP" = time of possession. For other American football terms, see Glossary of American football.							14	56

=== Utah ===
Utah Utes (4–6) at #21 BYU Cougars (8–2)

Quarter	1	2	3	4	Total
Utah	0	7	3	21	31
BYU	28	21	14	7	70

at Cougar Stadium, Provo, Utah

- Date: November 18, 1989
- Game weather: Hazy, 44 °F (7 °C)
- Game attendance: 66,110
- Box Score

Team	Category	Player	Statistics
Utah	Passing	Mike Richmond	28/44, 393 Yds, 4 TD
Utah	Rushing	Steve Abrams	21 Rush, 94 Yds
Utah	Receiving	Darrel Hicks	11 Rec, 126 Yds, 3 TD
BYU	Passing	Ty Detmer	18/22, 358 Yds, 4 TD
BYU	Rushing	Stacey Corley	14 Rush, 159 Yds, TD
BYU	Receiving	Chris Smith	6 Rec, 194 Yds, TD

Scoring summary

Quarter	Time	Drive			Team	Scoring information	Score	
Quarter	Time	Plays	Yards	TOP	Team	Scoring information	UTAH	BYU
1					BYU	Matt Bellini 18-yard touchdown reception from Ty Detmer, Jason Chaffetz kick good	0	7
1					BYU	Ty Detmer 7-yard touchdown run, Jason Chaffetz kick good	0	14
1					BYU	Fred Whittingham 6-yard touchdown run, Jason Chaffetz kick good	0	21
1					BYU	Jeff Frandsen 9-yard touchdown reception from Ty Detmer, Jason Chaffetz kick good	0	28
2					BYU	Fred Whittingham 6-yard touchdown run, Jason Chaffetz kick good	0	35
2					BYU	Chris Smith 76-yard touchdown reception from Ty Detmer, Jason Chaffetz kick good	0	42
2					BYU	Matt Odle 11-yard touchdown reception from Ty Detmer, Jason Chaffetz kick good	0	49
2					Utah	Darrel Hicks 12-yard touchdown reception from Mike Richmond, Wayne Lammle kick good	7	49
3					Utah	29-yard field goal by Wayne Lammle	10	49
3					BYU	Fred Whittingham 5-yard touchdown run, Jason Chaffetz kick good	10	56
3					BYU	Stacey Corley 81-yard touchdown run, Jason Chaffetz kick good	10	63
4					Utah	Darrel Hicks 3-yard touchdown reception from Mike Richmond, Wayne Lammle kick good	17	63
4					Utah	Darrel Hicks 27-yard touchdown reception from Mike Richmond, Wayne Lammle kick good	24	63
4					Utah	Dennis Smith 7-yard touchdown reception from Mike Richmond, Wayne Lammle kick good	31	63
4					BYU	Peter Tuipulotu 29-yard touchdown run, Jason Chaffetz kick good	31	70
"TOP" = time of possession. For other American football terms, see Glossary of American football.							31	70

== Personnel ==
1989 BYU Cougars football team roster
Players
Coaches
Offense

Pos.	#	Name	Class
RB	8	Matt Bellini	Jr
		Andy Boyce
QB	10	Sean Covey	Sr
QB	14	Ty Detmer	So
OL	64	Mohammed Elewonibi	Sr
OL	68	Don Goodman	Sr
WR	87	Jeff Frandsen	Sr
OT	61	Mike Keim	So
		Micah Matsuzaki
RB		Eric Mortensen
WR	29	Brent Nyberg	Jr
WR	88	Matt Odle	Sr
TE	94	Chris Smith	Sr
RB	32	Peter Tuipulotu	So
		Nati Valdez
FB	33	Freddie Whittingham (C)	Sr

Defense

Pos.	#	Name	Class
DT	97	Tim Adams	Sr
DB	20	Josh Arnold	So
LB	44	Byron Beatty	Sr
DB	7	Eric Bergeson	Sr
DT	99	Bud Burr	Sr
DB	24	Tony Crutchfield	So
	36	Bob Davis	Sr
LB	37	Alema Fitisemanu	Jr
DB	42	Troy Fuller	Sr
DB	5	Derwin Gray	Fr
		Eddie Green
		Shad Hansen
		Duane Johnson
DT	59	Rich Kaufusi	Jr
		David Kinard
		Brian Mitchell
LB	4	Marc Neal	Sr
DT	93	Budd Orr	Sr
DT	51	Craig Patterson	Sr
		Chad Robinson

Special teams

Pos.	#	Name	Class
K		Jason Chaffetz
P		Earl Kauffman

Head coach

- LaVell Edwards

Coordinators/assistant coaches

- Norm Chow
- Roger French

Legend

- (C) Team captain
- (S) Suspended
- (I) Ineligible
- Injured
- Redshirt
