= 1989 Cal State Fullerton Titans football team =

American college football season

1989 Cal State Fullerton Titans football
- Conference: Big West Conference
- Record: 6–4–1 (5–2 Big West)
- Head coach: Gene Murphy (10th season)
- Offensive coordinator: Bill Wentworth (1st season)
- Defensive coordinator: Kirk Harmon (2nd season)
- Home stadium: Santa Ana Stadium

1989 Big West Conference football standings
| | Conf. | | | | | Overall |
| Team | W | | L | | T | W | | L | | T |
|---|---|---|---|---|---|---|---|---|---|---|
| Fresno State $ | 7 | – | 0 | – | 0 | 11 | – | 1 | – | 0 |
| Cal State Fullerton | 5 | – | 2 | – | 0 | 6 | – | 4 | – | 1 |
| San Jose State | 5 | – | 2 | – | 0 | 6 | – | 5 | – | 0 |
| Utah State | 4 | – | 3 | – | 0 | 4 | – | 7 | – | 0 |
| UNLV | 3 | – | 4 | – | 0 | 4 | – | 7 | – | 0 |
| Long Beach State | 2 | – | 5 | – | 0 | 4 | – | 8 | – | 0 |
| Pacific (CA) | 2 | – | 5 | – | 0 | 2 | – | 10 | – | 0 |
| New Mexico State | 0 | – | 7 | – | 0 | 0 | – | 11 | – | 0 |
$ – Conference champion

The 1989 Cal State Fullerton Titans football team represented California State University, Fullerton as a member of the Big West Conference during the 1989 NCAA Division I-A football season. Led by tenth-year head coach Gene Murphy, Cal State Fullerton compiled an overall record of 6–4–1 with a mark of 5–2 in conference play, tying for second place in the Big West. By winning the last three games, the Titans finished over the .500 mark for the first time since 1985. The team played home games at Santa Ana Stadium in Santa Ana, California.

== Schedule ==
| Date | Opponent | Site | Result | Attendance | Source |
|---|---|---|---|---|---|
| September 2 | at Northern Illinois* | Huskie Stadium; DeKalb, IL | L 17–26 | 8,235 | |
| September 9 | Cal State Northridge* | Santa Ana Stadium; Santa Ana, CA | W 27–20 | 2,909 | |
| September 16 | at Colorado State* | Hughes Stadium; Fort Collins, CO | L 14–42 | 20,098 | |
| September 23 | at San Diego State* | Jack Murphy Stadium; San Diego, CA | T 41–41 | 15,721 | |
| September 30 | at UNLV | Santa Ana Stadium; Santa Ana, CA | W 34–20 | 3,900 | |
| October 7 | at Utah State | Romney Stadium; Logan, UT | L 23–34 | 10,567 | |
| October 14 | at Pacific (CA) | Stagg Memorial Stadium; Stockton, CA | W 35–26 | 7,127 | |
| October 21 | at Fresno State | Bulldog Stadium; Fresno, CA | L 19–33 | 32,135 | |
| November 4 | New Mexico State | Santa Ana Stadium; Santa Ana, CA | W 45–10 | 3,114 | |
| November 11 | Long Beach State | Santa Ana Stadium; Santa Ana, CA | W 31–13 | 5,111 | |
| November 18 | at San Jose State | Spartan Stadium; San Jose, CA | W 18–14 | 6,746 | |
*Non-conference game

== Team players in the NFL ==
The following Cal State Fullerton players were selected in the 1990 NFL draft.

| Player | Position | Round | Overall | NFL team |
| Mike Pringle (Note: Although Mike Pringle was taken in the NFL draft, he never played in the NFL. However, he had a very successful career in the Canadian Football League (CFL) and was elected to the Canadian Football Hall of Fame in 2008.) | Running back | 6 | 139 | Atlanta Falcons |
