= 1989 Long Beach State 49ers football team =

American college football season

1989 Long Beach State 49ers football
- Conference: Big West Conference
- Record: 4–8 (2–5 Big West)
- Head coach: Larry Reisbig (3rd season)
- Defensive coordinator: Ken Visser (9th season)
- Home stadium: Veterans Stadium

1989 Big West Conference football standings
	Conf.					Overall
Team	W		L		T	W		L		T
Fresno State $	7	–	0	–	0	11	–	1	–	0
Cal State Fullerton	5	–	2	–	0	6	–	4	–	1
San Jose State	5	–	2	–	0	6	–	5	–	0
Utah State	4	–	3	–	0	4	–	7	–	0
UNLV	3	–	4	–	0	4	–	7	–	0
Long Beach State	2	–	5	–	0	4	–	8	–	0
Pacific (CA)	2	–	5	–	0	2	–	10	–	0
New Mexico State	0	–	7	–	0	0	–	11	–	0
$ – Conference champion

The 1989 Long Beach State 49ers football team represented California State University, Long Beach (Note: The official name of Long Beach State has been California State University, Long Beach since 1972. However, it is still commonly known as Long Beach State.) during the 1989 NCAA Division I-A football season.

Cal State Long Beach competed in the Big West Conference. The team was led by third-year head coach Larry Reisbig, and played home games at Veterans Stadium on the campus of Long Beach City College in Long Beach, California. They finished the season with a record of four wins and eight losses (4–8, 2–5 Big West). The 49ers offense scored 246 points while the defense allowed 407 points.

== Schedule ==
Date	Opponent	Site	Result	Attendance	Source
September 2	Cal State Northridge*	Veterans Memorial Stadium; Long Beach, CA	W 28–9	3,102	
September 9	at Hawaii*	Aloha Stadium; Halawa, HI	L 10–63	42,317	
September 16	at No. 12 (I-AA) Boise State*	Bronco Stadium; Boise, ID	W 17–14	20,307	
September 23	at Fresno State	Bulldog Stadium; Fresno CA	L 0–52	35,102	
September 30	at Pacific (CA)	Stagg Memorial Stadium; Stockton, CA	L 25–26	5,260	
October 7	New Mexico State	Veterans Memorial Stadium; Long Beach, CA	W 55–48	2,142	
October 14	at San Diego State*	Jack Murphy Stadium; San Diego, CA	L 26–30	13,548	
October 21	San Jose State	Veterans Memorial Stadium; Long Beach, CA	L 10–21	3,782	
October 28	at Oregon*	Autzen Stadium; Eugene, OR	L 10–52	31,381	
November 4	at UNLV	Sam Boyd Silver Bowl; Whitney, NV	L 21–43	16,562	
November 11	at Cal State Fullerton	Santa Ana Stadium; Santa Ana, CA	L 13–31	5,111	
November 25	Utah State	Veterans Memorial Stadium; Long Beach, CA	W 31–18	1,575	
*Non-conference game; Rankings from NCAA Division I-AA Football Committee Poll released prior to the game
