= 1989 Hawaii Rainbow Warriors football team =

American college football season

1989 Hawaii Rainbow Warriors football

Aloha Bowl, L 13–33 vs. Michigan State
- Conference: Western Athletic Conference
- Record: 9–3–1 (5–2–1 WAC)
- Head coach: Bob Wagner (3rd season)
- Offensive coordinator: Paul Johnson (3rd season)
- Offensive scheme: Triple option
- Defensive coordinator: Rich Ellerson (3rd season)
- Base defense: 4–3
- Home stadium: Aloha Stadium

1989 Western Athletic Conference football standings
	Conf.					Overall
Team	W		L		T	W		L		T
No. 22 BYU $	7	–	1	–	0	10	–	3	–	0
Air Force	5	–	1	–	1	8	–	4	–	1
Hawaii	5	–	2	–	1	9	–	3	–	1
Wyoming	5	–	3	–	0	5	–	6	–	0
San Diego State	4	–	3	–	0	6	–	5	–	1
Colorado State	4	–	3	–	0	5	–	5	–	1
Utah	2	–	6	–	0	4	–	8	–	0
UTEP	1	–	7	–	0	2	–	10	–	0
New Mexico	0	–	7	–	0	2	–	10	–	0
$ – Conference champion; Rankings from AP Poll

The 1989 Hawaii Rainbow Warriors football team represented the University of Hawaiʻi at Mānoa in the Western Athletic Conference during the 1989 NCAA Division I-A football season. In their third season under head coach Bob Wagner, the Rainbow Warriors compiled a 9–3–1 record.

== Schedule ==
Date	Opponent	Rank	Site	Result	Attendance	Source
September 2	Tulane*		Aloha Stadium; Halawa, HI	W 31–26	45,667	
September 9	Long Beach State*		Aloha Stadium; Halawa, HI	W 63–10	42,317	
September 16	at Wyoming		War Memorial Stadium; Laramie, WY (rivalry)	L 15–20	20,102	
September 23	Utah		Aloha Stadium; Halawa, HI	W 67–20	42,417	
September 30	New Mexico		Aloha Stadium; Halawa, HI	W 60–14	38,345	
October 7	San Diego State		Aloha Stadium; Halawa, HI	W 31–24	42,958	
October 21	at Colorado State		Hughes Stadium; Fort Collins, CO	L 16–31	29,774	
October 28	No. 18 BYU		Aloha Stadium; Halawa, HI	W 56–14	50,000	
November 4	UTEP^{†}		Aloha Stadium; Halawa, HI	W 26–7	41,418	
November 11	Pacific (CA)*		Aloha Stadium; Halawa, HI	W 34–26	39,167	
November 25	Oregon State*	No. 24	Aloha Stadium; Halawa, HI	W 23–21	45,763	
December 9	Air Force	No. 23	Aloha Stadium; Halawa, HI (rivalry)	T 35–35	48,799	
December 25	vs. No. 22 Michigan State*	No. 25	Aloha Stadium; Halawa, HI (Aloha Bowl)	L 13–33	50,000	
*Non-conference game; ^{†}Homecoming; Rankings from AP Poll released prior to the game

== Game summaries ==
=== BYU ===
#18 BYU Cougars (6–1) at Hawaii Rainbow Warriors (5–2)

Quarter	1	2	3	4	Total
BYU	0	7	0	7	14
Hawaii	14	21	14	7	56

at Aloha Stadium, Halawa, Hawaii

- Date: October 28, 1989
- Game time: 7:30 p.m.
- Game weather: Fair, 77 °F (25 °C)
- Game attendance: 46,841
- Referee: Pat Sweeney
- Box Score, Box Score

Team	Category	Player	Statistics
BYU	Passing	Ty Detmer	24/35, 427 Yds, TD, 2 INT
BYU	Rushing	Matt Bellini	7 Rush, 11 Yds
BYU	Receiving	Matt Bellini	6 Rec, 140 Yds
Hawaii	Passing	Garrett Gabriel	22/29, 440 Yds, 4 TD
Hawaii	Rushing	Jamal Farmer	18 Rush, 54 Yds, 2 TD
Hawaii	Receiving	Chris Roscoe	8 Rec, 158 Yds, TD

Scoring summary

Quarter	Time	Drive			Team	Scoring information	Score	
Quarter	Time	Plays	Yards	TOP	Team	Scoring information	BYU	UH
1	11:21	10	80	3:39	Hawaii	Jamal Farmer 1-yard touchdown run, Jason Elam kick good	0	7
1	2:34	17	87	6:15	Hawaii	Chris Roscoe 8-yard touchdown reception from Garrett Gabriel, Jason Elam kick good	0	14
2	14:00	3	86	1:39	Hawaii	Jamal Farmer 83-yard touchdown reception from Garrett Gabriel, Jason Elam kick good	0	21
2	9:55	9	84	4:00	BYU	Matt Bellini 1-yard touchdown run, Jason Chaffetz kick good	7	21
2	8:09	4	77	1:39	Hawaii	Jeff Newman 45-yard touchdown reception from Garrett Gabriel, Jason Elam kick good	7	28
2	3:27	6	43	2:16	Hawaii	Jamal Farmer 1-yard touchdown run, Jason Elam kick good	7	35
3	10:26	6	80	2:53	Hawaii	Richard Stevenson 6-yard touchdown run, Jason Elam kick good	7	42
3	5:15	8	69	4:08	Hawaii	Jeff Sydner 5-yard touchdown run, Jason Elam kick good	7	49
4	14:55	7	61	3:43	Hawaii	Darrick Branch 22-yard touchdown reception from Garrett Gabriel, Jason Elam kick good	7	56
4	2:57	6	99	1:32	BYU	Jeff Frandsen 23-yard touchdown reception from Ty Detmer, Jason Chaffetz kick good	14	56
"TOP" = time of possession. For other American football terms, see Glossary of American football.							14	56

== Personnel ==
1989 Hawaii Warriors football team roster
Players
Coaches
Offense

Pos.	#	Name	Class
SB		Ahuna
C		Alivado
WR		Darrick Branch
WR		Brantley
SB		Carpenter
RB		Cox
RB		Jamal Farmer
SB		Frias
QB		Garrett Gabriel
OT		Goeas
G		Jones
OT		Kaaialii
C		Kaleleiki
SB		Kealoha
WR		Lau
SB		Mahuka
OT		Manera
SB		McArthur
WR		Jeff Newman
QB		Ken Niumatalolo
WR		Oshiro
WR		Pittman
G		Poti
OT		Robinson
WR		Chris Roscoe
G		Sagapolu
QB		Santiago
SB		Senter
G		Smith
SB		Rich Stevenson
SB		Jeff Sydner
OT		Tua
RB		Young

Defense

Pos.	#	Name	Class
S		Bryan Addison
CB		Anzai
DT		Augie Apelu
ILB		Joaquin Barnett
S		Walter Briggs
CB		Burton
DT		Akili Calhoun
CB		Michael Coulson
DT		Dana Directo
OLB		Dan Duncan
DT		Tony Godinet
CB		Patrick Gordon
DT		Delmar Johnson
DT		Kahoano
LB		Nuuanu Kaulia
ROV		David Maeva
CB		Kim McCloud
S		David Mossman
OLB		Mark Odom
ILB		Louis Randall
OLB		Gavin Robertson
DT		Lyno Samana
ROV		Joe Sardo
DT		Stant
OLB		Herman Talley
S		Mike Tresler
DT		Tuatalatasi
S		Terry Whitaker
DT		Manly Williams
ROV		Jerry Winfrey
OLB		Yamasaki

Special teams

Pos.	#	Name	Class
		Sean Abreu
P		Kyle Ah Loo
K		Jason Elam
		Sim

Head coach

- Bob Wagner

Coordinators/assistant coaches

- Paul Johnson (OC)

Legend

- (C) Team captain
- (S) Suspended
- (I) Ineligible
- Injured
- Redshirt
