= 1989 California Bowl =

- Bowl Game
Ball State Cardinals	Fresno State Bulldogs
(7–2–2)	(10–1)
6	27
Head coach: Paul Schudel	Head coach: Jim Sweeney
	1	2	3	4	Total
Ball State	0	6	0	0	6
Fresno State	0	10	3	14	27
- Date: December 9, 1989
- Season: 1989
- Stadium: Bulldog Stadium
- Location: Fresno, California
- MVP: LB Ron Cox (Fresno State)
- Attendance: 31,610

The 1989 California Bowl was an American college football bowl game played on December 9, 1989 at Bulldog Stadium in Fresno, California. The game pitted the Fresno State Bulldogs and the Ball State Cardinals.

== Background ==
Fresno State won their first 10 games of the season, rising up to #23 in the polls while clinching the Big West Conference title, their fourth in eight seasons. A loss to New Mexico in the regular season finale dropped them from the ranks, though the Bulldogs were still invited to the California Bowl once again. The Cardinals, despite having one less win than the previous season (8-3, while finishing 3rd), the Cardinals (who had played 12 games, with ties to Rutgers and Central Michigan) managed to edge out over Eastern Michigan (6-2), Toledo (6-2), and Central Michigan (5-2-1) for the MAC title. The Cardinals lost only one conference game (to Toledo), while not losing to every other MAC opponent, with a 33-14 win over Ohio in the regular season finale avoiding a three-way tie and clinching it outright for Ball State. This was Ball State's first Mid-American Conference title since 1978. This was also their first ever bowl game appearance.

== Game summary ==
- Fresno State - Steve Loop, 34 field goal
- Ball State - Tom Barbee, 1 yard touchdown run (kick failed)
- Fresno State - Stephen Shelley, 91 yard touchdown pass from Mark Barsotti (Loop kick)
- Fresno State - Ron Cox, 58 yard interception return for a touchdown (Loop kick)
- Fresno State - Curt Thornton, 5 yard touchdown pass from Eric Buechele (Loop kick)

This was Fresno State's fourth bowl win in eight years.

== Aftermath ==
Ball State wouldn't make a bowl appearance again until 1993 when they won the MAC title. They did not win a bowl game until 2020. As for Fresno State, they won the Big West Conference two years later in their final season with the conference, which gave them the right to play in the California Bowl once again, which turned out to be the last held, which they lost. They did not win another bowl game until 1992.
