= 1989 Pacific Tigers football team =

American college football season

1989 Pacific Tigers football
- Conference: Big West Conference
- Record: 2–10 (2–5 Big West)
- Head coach: Walt Harris (1st season)
- Offensive coordinator: John Shannon (1st season)
- Offensive scheme: Run and shoot
- Defensive coordinator: Ken Blue (1st season)
- Base defense: 4–3
- Home stadium: Stagg Memorial Stadium

1989 Big West Conference football standings
	Conf.					Overall
Team	W		L		T	W		L		T
Fresno State $	7	–	0	–	0	11	–	1	–	0
Cal State Fullerton	5	–	2	–	0	6	–	4	–	1
San Jose State	5	–	2	–	0	6	–	5	–	0
Utah State	4	–	3	–	0	4	–	7	–	0
UNLV	3	–	4	–	0	4	–	7	–	0
Long Beach State	2	–	5	–	0	4	–	8	–	0
Pacific (CA)	2	–	5	–	0	2	–	10	–	0
New Mexico State	0	–	7	–	0	0	–	11	–	0
$ – Conference champion

The 1989 Pacific Tigers football team represented the University of the Pacific (UOP) in the 1989 NCAA Division I-A football season as a member of the Big West Conference.

The team was led by head coach Walt Harris, in his first year, and played home games at Stagg Memorial Stadium in Stockton, California. They finished the season with a record of two wins and ten losses (2–10, 2–5 Big West). The Tigers were not competitive in many of their games in 1989, being outscored by their opponents 179–406 over the season. In their 10 losses, that's an average score of 14–37.

== Schedule ==
Date	Opponent	Site	Result	Attendance	Source
September 2	at No. 20 Pittsburgh*	Pitt Stadium; Pittsburgh, PA	L 3–38	35,421	
September 9	at No. 5 Auburn*	Jordan–Hare Stadium; Auburn, AL	L 0–55	77,000	
September 16	Fresno State	Stagg Memorial Stadium; Stockton, CA	L 14–27	4,735	
September 23	at San Jose State	Spartan Stadium; San Jose, CA (Victory Bell)	L 32–41	12,508	
September 30	Long Beach State	Stagg Memorial Stadium; Stockton, CA	W 26–25	5,260	
October 7	at UNLV	Sam Boyd Silver Bowl; Whitney, NV	L 7–30	15,030	
October 14	Cal State Fullerton^{†}	Stagg Memorial Stadium; Stockton, CA	L 26–35	7,127	
October 21	at San Diego State*	Jack Murphy Stadium; San Diego, CA	L 7–35	21,120	
October 28	at No. 17 Arizona*	Arizona Stadium; Tucson, AZ	L 14–38	46,449	
November 4	Utah State	Stagg Memorial Stadium; Stockton, CA	L 10–38	5,037	
November 11	at Hawaii*	Aloha Stadium; Halawa, HI	L 26–34	39,167	
November 18	at New Mexico State	Aggie Memorial Stadium; Las Cruces, NM	W 14–10		
*Non-conference game; ^{†}Homecoming; Rankings from AP Poll released prior to the game

== Team players in the NFL ==
No UOP players were selected in the 1990 NFL draft. The following finished their college career in 1989, were not drafted, but played in the NFL.

Player	Position	First NFL team
Dirk Borgognone	Kicker	1990 Green Bay Packers
