= 1989 Toledo Rockets football team =

American college football season

1989 Toledo Rockets football
- Conference: Mid-American Conference
- Record: 6–5 (6–2 MAC)
- Head coach: Dan Simrell (8th season)
- Home stadium: Glass Bowl

1989 Mid-American Conference football standings
	Conf.					Overall
Team	W		L		T	W		L		T
Ball State $	6	–	1	–	1	7	–	3	–	2
Eastern Michigan	6	–	2	–	0	7	–	3	–	1
Toledo	6	–	2	–	0	6	–	5	–	0
Central Michigan	5	–	2	–	1	5	–	5	–	1
Bowling Green	5	–	3	–	0	5	–	6	–	0
Western Michigan	3	–	5	–	0	5	–	6	–	0
Miami (OH)	2	–	5	–	1	2	–	8	–	1
Ohio	1	–	6	–	1	1	–	9	–	1
Kent State	0	–	8	–	0	0	–	11	–	0
$ – Conference champion

The 1989 Toledo Rockets football team was an American football team that represented the University of Toledo in the Mid-American Conference (MAC) during the 1988 NCAA Division I-A football season. In their eighth season under head coach Dan Simrell, the Rockets compiled a 6–5 record (6–2 against MAC opponents), finished in a tie for second place in the MAC, and were outscored by all opponents by a combined total of 272 to 254.

The team's statistical leaders included Mark Melfi with 1,632 passing yards, Wayne Goodwin with 859 rushing yards, and Rick Isaiah with 743 receiving yards.

== Schedule ==
Date	Opponent	Site	Result	Attendance	Source
September 2	Ohio	Glass Bowl; Toledo, OH	W 27–18	19,217	
September 16	at Wisconsin*	Camp Randall Stadium; Madison, WI	L 10–23	37,162	
September 23	Ball State	Glass Bowl; Toledo, OH	W 29–22	17,992	
September 30	at Indiana*	Memorial Stadium; Bloomington, IN	L 12–32	43,501	
October 7	at Eastern Michigan	Rynearson Stadium; Ypsilanti, MI	L 14–31		
October 14	at Bowling Green	Doyt Perry Stadium; Bowling Green, OH (rivalry)	L 23–27		
October 21	Miami (OH)	Glass Bowl; Toledo, OH	W 17–14	18,696	
October 28	at Kent State	Dix Stadium; Kent, OH	W 47–42		
November 4	Western Michigan	Glass Bowl; Toledo, OH	W 19–18	22,653	
November 11	at Northern Illinois*	Huskie Stadium; DeKalb, IL	L 27–39	5,971	
November 18	Central Michigan	Glass Bowl; Toledo, OH	W 29–6	15,886	
*Non-conference game
