= 1989 Bowling Green Falcons football team =

American college football season

1989 Bowling Green Falcons football
- Conference: Mid-American Conference
- Record: 5–6 (5–3 MAC)
- Head coach: Moe Ankney (4th season)
- Defensive coordinator: Bob Wolfe (4th season)
- Home stadium: Doyt Perry Stadium

1989 Mid-American Conference football standings
	Conf.					Overall
Team	W		L		T	W		L		T
Ball State $	6	–	1	–	1	7	–	3	–	2
Eastern Michigan	6	–	2	–	0	7	–	3	–	1
Toledo	6	–	2	–	0	6	–	5	–	0
Central Michigan	5	–	2	–	1	5	–	5	–	1
Bowling Green	5	–	3	–	0	5	–	6	–	0
Western Michigan	3	–	5	–	0	5	–	6	–	0
Miami (OH)	2	–	5	–	1	2	–	8	–	1
Ohio	1	–	6	–	1	1	–	9	–	1
Kent State	0	–	8	–	0	0	–	11	–	0
$ – Conference champion

The 1989 Bowling Green Falcons football team was an American football team that represented Bowling Green State University in the Mid-American Conference (MAC) during the 1989 NCAA Division I-A football season. In their fourth season under head coach Moe Ankney, the Falcons compiled a 5–6 record (5–3 against MAC opponents), finished in fifth place in the MAC, and were outscored by all opponents by a combined total of 319 to 233.

The team's statistical leaders included Rich Dackin with 2,679 passing yards, LeRoy Smith with 564 rushing yards, and Ronald Heard with 916 receiving yards.

== Schedule ==
Date	Opponent	Site	Result	Attendance	Source
September 9	at East Carolina*	Ficklen Memorial Stadium; Greenville, NC	L 6–41	33,412	
September 16	Ball State	Doyt Perry Stadium; Bowling Green, OH	L 3–28	8,286	
September 23	Central Michigan	Doyt Perry Stadium; Bowling Green, OH	W 24–20	15,103	
September 30	Akron*	Doyt Perry Stadium; Bowling Green, OH	L 24–38	25,057	
October 7	at Ohio	Peden Stadium; Athens, OH	W 31–28		
October 14	Toledo	Doyt Perry Stadium; Bowling Green, OH (rivalry)	W 27–23		
October 21	at Eastern Michigan	Rynearson Stadium; Ypsilanti, MI	L 13–21	11,229	
October 28	at Miami (OH)	Yager Stadium; Oxford, OH	L 13–17	14,787	
November 4	Kent State	Doyt Perry Stadium; Bowling Green, OH (Anniversary Award)	W 51–28	15,220	
November 11	at Western Michigan	Waldo Stadium; Kalamazoo, MI	W 31–30	6,575	
November 18	at Tulsa*	Skelly Stadium; Tulsa, OK	L 10–45	25,629	
*Non-conference game
