= 1989 San Diego State Aztecs football team =

American college football season

1989 San Diego State Aztecs football
- Conference: Western Athletic Conference
- Record: 6–5–1 (4–3 WAC)
- Head coach: Al Luginbill (1st season)
- Offensive coordinator: Dave Lay (1st season)
- Offensive scheme: Single set back
- Defensive coordinator: Barry Lamb (1st season)
- Base defense: 4–3
- Home stadium: Jack Murphy Stadium

1989 Western Athletic Conference football standings
	Conf.					Overall
Team	W		L		T	W		L		T
No. 22 BYU $	7	–	1	–	0	10	–	3	–	0
Air Force	5	–	1	–	1	8	–	4	–	1
Hawaii	5	–	2	–	1	9	–	3	–	1
Wyoming	5	–	3	–	0	5	–	6	–	0
San Diego State	4	–	3	–	0	6	–	5	–	1
Colorado State	4	–	3	–	0	5	–	5	–	1
Utah	2	–	6	–	0	4	–	8	–	0
UTEP	1	–	7	–	0	2	–	10	–	0
New Mexico	0	–	7	–	0	2	–	10	–	0
$ – Conference champion; Rankings from AP Poll

The 1989 San Diego State Aztecs football team represented San Diego State University as a member of the Western Athletic Conference (WAC) during the 1989 NCAA Division I-A football season. Led by first-year head coach Al Luginbill, the Aztecs compiled an overall record of 6–5–1 with a mark of 4–3 conference play, tying for fourth place in the WAC. The team played home games at Jack Murphy Stadium in San Diego.

The 1989 was the first season in three years in which San Diego State had a winning record.

== Schedule ==
Date	Opponent	Site	Result	Attendance	Source
September 2	at Air Force	Falcon Stadium; Colorado Springs, CO	L 36–52	44,579	
September 16	UCLA*	Jack Murphy Stadium; San Diego, CA	L 25–28	31,639	
September 23	Cal State Fullerton*	Jack Murphy Stadium; San Diego, CA	T 41–41	15,721	
September 30	at Utah	Robert Rice Stadium; Salt Lake City, UT	W 38–27	29,585	
October 7	at Hawaii	Aloha Stadium; Halawa, HI	L 24–31	42,958	
October 14	Long Beach State*	Jack Murphy Stadium; San Diego, CA	W 30–26	13,548	
October 21	Pacific (CA)*^{†}	Jack Murphy Stadium; San Diego, CA	W 35–7	21,120	
October 28	at UTEP	Sun Bowl; El Paso, TX	W 34–31	17,070	
November 4	New Mexico	Jack Murphy Stadium; San Diego, CA	W 45–28	13,776	
November 11	at Wyoming	War Memorial Stadium; Laramie, WY	W 27–17	20,564	
November 18	at No. 7 Miami (FL)*	Miami Orange Bowl; Miami, FL	L 6–42	42,362	
November 25	No. 21 BYU	Jack Murphy Stadium; San Diego, CA	L 27–48	28,868	
*Non-conference game; ^{†}Homecoming; Rankings from AP Poll released prior to the game

== Team players in the NFL ==
The following were selected in the 1990 NFL draft.

Player	Position	Round	Overall	NFL team
Roman Fortin	Center - Tackle - Guard	8	203	Detroit Lions
Robert Claiborne	Wide Receiver	12	313	Detroit Lions

== Team awards ==
Award	Player
Most Valuable Player (John Simcox Memorial Trophy)	John Wesselman
Outstanding Offensive & Defensive Linemen (Byron H. Chase Memorial Trophy)	Roman Fortin, Off; Milt Wilson, Def
Team captains Dr. R. Hardy / C.E. Peterson Memorial Trophy	Monty Gilbreath, Off; John Wesselman, Def; Keith Owens, Special Teams
Most Inspirational Player	Joe Santos
