= 1989 Wyoming Cowboys football team =

American college football season

1989 Wyoming Cowboys football
- Conference: Western Athletic Conference
- Record: 5–6 (5–3 WAC)
- Head coach: Paul Roach (3rd season)
- Home stadium: War Memorial Stadium

1989 Western Athletic Conference football standings
	Conf.					Overall
Team	W		L		T	W		L		T
No. 22 BYU $	7	–	1	–	0	10	–	3	–	0
Air Force	5	–	1	–	1	8	–	4	–	1
Hawaii	5	–	2	–	1	9	–	3	–	1
Wyoming	5	–	3	–	0	5	–	6	–	0
San Diego State	4	–	3	–	0	6	–	5	–	1
Colorado State	4	–	3	–	0	5	–	5	–	1
Utah	2	–	6	–	0	4	–	8	–	0
UTEP	1	–	7	–	0	2	–	10	–	0
New Mexico	0	–	7	–	0	2	–	10	–	0
$ – Conference champion; Rankings from AP Poll

The 1989 Wyoming Cowboys football team represented the University of Wyoming in the 1989 NCAA Division I-A football season. It was the Cowboys' 94th season and they competed as a member of the Western Athletic Conference (WAC). The team was led by head coach Paul Roach, in his third year, and played their home games at War Memorial Stadium in Laramie, Wyoming. They finished with a record of five wins and six losses (5–6, 5–3 WAC).The Cowboys offense scored 357 points, while the defense allowed 329 points.

== Schedule ==
Date	Time	Opponent	Site	TV	Result	Attendance	Source
September 2		Louisville*	War Memorial Stadium; Laramie, WY		L 21–28	26,132	
September 10		at Air Force	Falcon Stadium; Colorado Springs, CO	ESPN	L 7–45	45,799	
September 16		Hawaii	War Memorial Stadium; Laramie, WY (rivalry)		W 20–15	20,102	
September 23		No. 19 Washington State*	War Memorial Stadium; Laramie, WY		L 23–29	20,041	
September 30	5:30 p.m.	at Oklahoma State*	Lewis Field; Stillwater, OK		L 7–27	40,200	
October 7		at BYU	Cougar Stadium; Provo, UT		L 20–36	65,630	
October 14	1:00 p.m.	Utah	War Memorial Stadium; Laramie, WY		W 45–24	24,139	
October 28		at New Mexico	University Stadium; Albuquerque, NM		W 24–23	20,033	
November 4		Colorado State	War Memorial Stadium; Laramie, WY (rivalry)		W 56–35	20,412	
November 11		at San Diego State	Jack Murphy Stadium; San Diego, CA		L 17–27	20,564	
November 18		UTEP	War Memorial Stadium; Laramie, WY		W 41–10	15,624	
*Non-conference game; Rankings from AP Poll released prior to the game; All times are in Mountain time

== Team players in the NFL ==
The following were selected in the 1990 NFL draft.

Player	Position	Round	Overall	NFL team
Craig Schlichting	Defensive dnd	8	214	Vikings
