= Tim Rose (American football) =

American football player and coach (born 1941)

Current position
- Title: Defensive coordinator & linebackers coach
- Team: Ashland
- Conference: G-MAC

Biographical details
- Born: October 14, 1941 (age 85)

Playing career
- 1960–1963: Xavier

Coaching career (HC unless noted)
- 1963–1964: Elder HS (OH) (assistant)
- 1964–1966: Moeller HS (OH) (assistant)
- 1967–1974: Lorain St. Mary's HS (OH)
- 1975–1977: Boulder HS (CO)
- 1978–1982: Miami (OH) (DC)
- 1983–1989: Miami (OH)
- 1992–1994: Memphis State (DC)
- 1995: Cincinnati (DC)
- 1996: Minnesota (DC)
- 1997–1998: Boston College (DC)
- 1999–2002: East Carolina (DC)
- 2003: Eastern Michigan (DC)
- 2004: Louisiana Tech (DC)
- 2005–2008: Toledo (DC)
- 2009–present: Ashland (DC/LB)

Head coaching record
- Overall: 31–44–3 (college)
- Bowls: 0–1

Accomplishments and honors

Championships
- 1 MAC (1986)

Tim Rose (born October 14, 1941) is an American college football coach and former player. He is the defensive coordinator and linebackers coach for Ashland University, positions he has held since 2009. Rose served as the head football coach at Miami University from 1983 to 1989, compiling a record of 31–44–3. He has over 35 years of experience as a defensive coordinator at the college level including stints at Miami, the University of Memphis, the University of Cincinnati, the University of Minnesota, Boston College, East Carolina University, Eastern Michigan University, Louisiana Tech University and the University of Toledo.

== Coaching career ==
Rose served as the head coach at Miami University in Oxford, Ohio from 1983 to 1989. He led the 1986 Miami squad to the Mid-American Conference (MAC) championship and a berth in the California Bowl. That season, Rose orchestrated perhaps the biggest win in the program's history with a 21–12 victory over No. 8 LSU in Baton Rouge. Even with his success in 1986, Rose only had two winning seasons in seven years at Miami and finished his tenure there with a record of 31–44–3 that included a streak of 20 games without a victory between 1987 and 1989. After the 1989 season, Rose's contract was not renewed and he was replaced by Randy Walker. Rose was the first coach since Edwin Sweetland in 1911 to leave Miami with a losing record. In 1999, while serving as defensive coordinator at East Carolina University, Rose was named as a finalist for the Broyles Award, given annually to the nation's top college football assistant coach.

== Family ==
Rose is the father of Kurt Rose, an American football coach who previously served as the head coach of the X-League's Tokyo Gas Creators, the company team for Tokyo Gas.

== Head coaching record ==
=== College ===
Year	Team	Overall	Conference	Standing	Bowl/playoffs
Miami Redskins (Mid-American Conference) (1983–1989)
1983	Miami	4–7	3–5	7th	
1984	Miami	4–7	3–5	T–6th	
1985	Miami	8–2–1	7–1–1	2nd	
1986	Miami	8–4	6–2	1st	L California
1987	Miami	5–6	5–3	T–2nd	
1988	Miami	0–10–1	0–7–1	9th	
1989	Miami	2–8–1	2–5–1	7th	
Miami:		31–44–3	26–28–3		
Total:		31–44–3			
National championship Conference title Conference division title or championship game berth
