= 1989 Utah State Aggies football team =

American college football season

1989 Utah State Aggies football
- Conference: Big West Conference
- Record: 4–7 (4–3 Big West)
- Head coach: Chuck Shelton (4th season)
- Offensive coordinator: Pat Behrns (1st season)
- Defensive coordinator: Fred Bleil (4th season)
- Home stadium: Romney Stadium

1989 Big West Conference football standings
	Conf.					Overall
Team	W		L		T	W		L		T
Fresno State $	7	–	0	–	0	11	–	1	–	0
Cal State Fullerton	5	–	2	–	0	6	–	4	–	1
San Jose State	5	–	2	–	0	6	–	5	–	0
Utah State	4	–	3	–	0	4	–	7	–	0
UNLV	3	–	4	–	0	4	–	7	–	0
Long Beach State	2	–	5	–	0	4	–	8	–	0
Pacific (CA)	2	–	5	–	0	2	–	10	–	0
New Mexico State	0	–	7	–	0	0	–	11	–	0
$ – Conference champion

The 1989 Utah State Aggies football team represented Utah State University during the 1989 NCAA Division I-A football season as a member of the Big West Conference. The Aggies were led by fourth-year head coach Chuck Shelton and played their home games at Romney Stadium in Logan, Utah. After a difficult 0–4 start (including two Top 25 opponents and two in-state rivalry games), the Aggies finished the season winning four of seven to finish with a record of four wins and seven losses (4–7, 4–3 Big West).

== Schedule ==
Date	Opponent	Site	Result	Attendance	Source
September 9	at Utah*	Robert Rice Stadium; Salt Lake City, UT (Battle of the Brothers, Beehive Boot)	L 10–45	30,948	
September 16	at No. 13 USC*	Los Angeles Memorial Coliseum; Los Angeles, CA	L 10–66	50,249	
September 23	at No. 20 Illinois*	Memorial Stadium; Champaign, IL	L 2–41	61,553	
September 30	BYU*	Romney Stadium; Logan, UT (rivalry, Beehive Boot)	L 10–37	26,906	
October 7	Cal State Fullerton	Romney Stadium; Logan, UT	W 34–23	10,567	
October 14	Fresno State	Romney Stadium; Logan, UT	L 7–34	13,147	
October 21	at New Mexico State	Aggie Memorial Stadium; Las Cruces, NM	W 28–13	9,949	
November 4	at Pacific (CA)	Stagg Memorial Stadium; Stockton, CA	W 38–10	5,037	
November 11	San Jose State	Romney Stadium; Logan, UT	L 7–33	12,028	
November 18	at UNLV	Sam Boyd Silver Bowl; Whitney, NV	W 27–22	17,710	
November 25	at Long Beach State	Veterans Memorial Stadium; Long Beach, CA	L 18–31	1,575	
*Non-conference game; Rankings from AP Poll released prior to the game
