= 1989 Eastern Michigan Hurons football team =

American college football season

1989 Eastern Michigan Hurons football
- Conference: Mid-American Conference
- Record: 7–3–1 (6–2 MAC)
- Head coach: Jim Harkema (7th season)
- Captain: Game captains
- Home stadium: Rynearson Stadium

1989 Mid-American Conference football standings
	Conf.					Overall
Team	W		L		T	W		L		T
Ball State $	6	–	1	–	1	7	–	3	–	2
Eastern Michigan	6	–	2	–	0	7	–	3	–	1
Toledo	6	–	2	–	0	6	–	5	–	0
Central Michigan	5	–	2	–	1	5	–	5	–	1
Bowling Green	5	–	3	–	0	5	–	6	–	0
Western Michigan	3	–	5	–	0	5	–	6	–	0
Miami (OH)	2	–	5	–	1	2	–	8	–	1
Ohio	1	–	6	–	1	1	–	9	–	1
Kent State	0	–	8	–	0	0	–	11	–	0
$ – Conference champion

The 1989 Eastern Michigan Hurons football team represented Eastern Michigan University in the 1989 NCAA Division I-A football season. In their seventh season under head coach Jim Harkema, the Hurons compiled a 7–3–1 record (6–2 against conference opponents), finished in second place in the Mid-American Conference, and outscored their opponents, 252 to 196. The team's statistical leaders included Tom Sullivan with 1,927 passing yards, Perry Foster with 1,087 rushing yards, and Todd Bell with 515 receiving yards.

== Schedule ==
Date	Opponent	Site	Result	Attendance	Source
September 2	Kent State	Rynearson Stadium; Ypsilanti, MI	W 30–7	17,127	
September 9	Youngstown State*	Rynearson Stadium; Ypsilanti, MI	W 14–3	12,262	
September 16	at Ohio	Peden Stadium; Athens, OH	W 30–25	11,000	
September 23	at Colorado State*	Hughes Stadium; Fort Collins, CO	T 35–35	22,149	
September 30	at Western Michigan	Waldo Stadium; Kalamazoo, MI	W 21–20	21,144	
October 7	Toledo	Rynearson Stadium; Ypsilanti, MI	W 31–14		
October 14	Liberty*	Rynearson Stadium; Ypsilanti, MI	L 24–25		
October 21	Bowling Green	Rynearson Stadium; Ypsilanti, MI	W 21–13	11,229	
October 28	at Central Michigan	Kelly/Shorts Stadium; Mount Pleasant, MI (rivalry)	L 9–24	20,155	
November 4	Miami (OH)	Rynearson Stadium; Ypsilanti, MI	W 20–7	9,552	
November 11	at Ball State	Ball State Stadium; Muncie, IN	L 17–23	7,350	
*Non-conference game
