= 1989 Ball State Cardinals football team =

American college football season

1989 Ball State Cardinals football

MAC champion

California Bowl, L 6–27 vs. Fresno State
- Conference: Mid-American Conference
- Record: 7–3–2 (6–1–1 MAC)
- Head coach: Paul Schudel (5th season)
- Offensive coordinator: Greg Meyer (3rd season)
- Home stadium: Ball State Stadium

1989 Mid-American Conference football standings
| | Conf. | | | | | Overall |
| Team | W | | L | | T | W | | L | | T |
|---|---|---|---|---|---|---|---|---|---|---|
| Ball State $ | 6 | – | 1 | – | 1 | 7 | – | 3 | – | 2 |
| Eastern Michigan | 6 | – | 2 | – | 0 | 7 | – | 3 | – | 1 |
| Toledo | 6 | – | 2 | – | 0 | 6 | – | 5 | – | 0 |
| Central Michigan | 5 | – | 2 | – | 1 | 5 | – | 5 | – | 1 |
| Bowling Green | 5 | – | 3 | – | 0 | 5 | – | 6 | – | 0 |
| Western Michigan | 3 | – | 5 | – | 0 | 5 | – | 6 | – | 0 |
| Miami (OH) | 2 | – | 5 | – | 1 | 2 | – | 8 | – | 1 |
| Ohio | 1 | – | 6 | – | 1 | 1 | – | 9 | – | 1 |
| Kent State | 0 | – | 8 | – | 0 | 0 | – | 11 | – | 0 |
$ – Conference champion

The 1989 Ball State Cardinals football team was an American football team that represented Ball State University in the Mid-American Conference (MAC) during the 1989 NCAA Division I-A football season. In its fifth season under head coach Paul Schudel, the team compiled a 7–3–2 record (6–1–1 against conference opponents) and won the MAC championship. The team played its home games at Ball State Stadium in Muncie, Indiana.

The team's statistical leaders included David Riley with 1,929 passing yards, Bernie Parmalee with 662 rushing yards, Sean Jones with 518 receiving yards, and Kenny Stucker with 84 points scored.

== Schedule ==
| Date | Opponent | Site | Result | Attendance | Source |
|---|---|---|---|---|---|
| September 2 | at No. 17 West Virginia* | Mountaineer Field; Morgantown, WV | L 10–35 | 57,866 | |
| September 9 | at Rutgers* | Rutgers Stadium; Piscataway, NJ | T 31–31 | 17,143 | |
| September 16 | at Bowling Green | Doyt Perry Stadium; Bowling Green, OH | W 28–3 | 8,286 | |
| September 23 | at Toledo | Glass Bowl; Toledo, OH | L 22–29 | 17,992 | |
| October 7 | Miami (OH) | Ball State Stadium; Muncie, IN | W 37–9 | 15,625 | |
| October 14 | at Kent State | Dix Stadium; Kent, OH | W 23–21 | 12,050 | |
| October 21 | Western Michigan | Ball State Stadium; Muncie, IN | W 14–13 | 12,150 | |
| October 26 | vs. Indiana State* | Hoosier Dome; Indianapolis, IN (Blue Key Victory Bell) | W 34–27 | 6,249 | |
| November 4 | Central Michigan | Ball State Stadium; Muncie, IN | T 13–13 | 7,985 | |
| November 11 | Eastern Michigan | Ball State Stadium; Muncie, IN | W 23–17 | 7,350 | |
| November 18 | at Ohio | Peden Stadium; Athens, OH | W 33–14 | 5,700 | |
| December 9 | vs. Fresno State* | Bulldog Stadium; Fresno, CA (California Bowl) | L 6–27 | 31,610 | |
*Non-conference game; Rankings from AP Poll released prior to the game
