= 1989 New Mexico State Aggies football team =

American college football season

1989 New Mexico State Aggies football
- Conference: Big West Conference
- Record: 0–11 (0–7 Big West)
- Head coach: Mike Knoll (4th season)
- Home stadium: Aggie Memorial Stadium

1989 Big West Conference football standings
| | Conf. | | | | | Overall |
| Team | W | | L | | T | W | | L | | T |
|---|---|---|---|---|---|---|---|---|---|---|
| Fresno State $ | 7 | – | 0 | – | 0 | 11 | – | 1 | – | 0 |
| Cal State Fullerton | 5 | – | 2 | – | 0 | 6 | – | 4 | – | 1 |
| San Jose State | 5 | – | 2 | – | 0 | 6 | – | 5 | – | 0 |
| Utah State | 4 | – | 3 | – | 0 | 4 | – | 7 | – | 0 |
| UNLV | 3 | – | 4 | – | 0 | 4 | – | 7 | – | 0 |
| Long Beach State | 2 | – | 5 | – | 0 | 4 | – | 8 | – | 0 |
| Pacific (CA) | 2 | – | 5 | – | 0 | 2 | – | 10 | – | 0 |
| New Mexico State | 0 | – | 7 | – | 0 | 0 | – | 11 | – | 0 |
$ – Conference champion

The 1989 New Mexico State Aggies football team was an American football team that represented New Mexico State University in the Big West Conference during the 1989 NCAA Division I-A football season. In their fourth year under head coach Mike Knoll, the Aggies compiled an 0–11 record. The team played its home games at Aggie Memorial Stadium in Las Cruces, New Mexico.

== Schedule ==
| Date | Opponent | Site | Result | Attendance | Source |
|---|---|---|---|---|---|
| September 2 | at No. 15 Oklahoma* | Oklahoma Memorial Stadium; Norman, OK | L 3–73 | 73,250 | |
| September 9 | at New Mexico* | University Stadium; Albuquerque, NM (rivalry) | L 13–45 | 25,537 | |
| September 16 | UTEP* | Aggie Memorial Stadium; Las Cruces, NM (rivalry) | L 27–29 | 25,823 | |
| September 23 | at UNLV | Sam Boyd Silver Bowl; Whitney, NV | L 14–26 | 13,164 | |
| October 7 | at Long Beach State | Veterans Memorial Stadium; Long Beach, CA | L 48–55 | 2,142 | |
| October 14 | at Tulsa* | Skelly Stadium; Tulsa, OK | L 13–34 | 21,134 | |
| October 21 | Utah State | Aggie Memorial Stadium; Las Cruces, NM | L 13–28 | 9,949 | |
| October 28 | at San Jose State | Spartan Stadium; San Jose, CA | L 6–34 | 9,737 | |
| November 4 | at Cal State Fullerton | Santa Ana Stadium; Santa Ana, CA | L 10–45 | 3,114 | |
| November 11 | No. 24 Fresno State | Aggie Memorial Stadium; Las Cruces, NM | L 5–45 | 4,826 | |
| November 18 | Pacific (CA) | Aggie Memorial Stadium; Las Cruces, NM | L 10–14 | | |
*Non-conference game; Rankings from AP Poll released prior to the game
