= 1989 UNLV Rebels football team =

American college football season

1989 UNLV Rebels football
- Conference: Big West Conference
- Record: 4–7 (3–4 Big West)
- Head coach: Wayne Nunnely (4th season)
- Offensive coordinator: Carl Ferrill (3rd season)
- Home stadium: Sam Boyd Silver Bowl

1989 Big West Conference football standings
	Conf.					Overall
Team	W		L		T	W		L		T
Fresno State $	7	–	0	–	0	11	–	1	–	0
Cal State Fullerton	5	–	2	–	0	6	–	4	–	1
San Jose State	5	–	2	–	0	6	–	5	–	0
Utah State	4	–	3	–	0	4	–	7	–	0
UNLV	3	–	4	–	0	4	–	7	–	0
Long Beach State	2	–	5	–	0	4	–	8	–	0
Pacific (CA)	2	–	5	–	0	2	–	10	–	0
New Mexico State	0	–	7	–	0	0	–	11	–	0
$ – Conference champion

The 1989 UNLV Rebels football team was an American football team that represented the University of Nevada, Las Vegas (UNLV) as a member of the Big West Conference during the 1989 NCAA Division I-A football season. In their fourth and final year under head coach Wayne Nunnely, the Rebels compiled an overall record of 4–7 with a mark of 3–4 in conference play, placing fifth in the Big West. The team played home games at the Sam Boyd Silver Bowl in Whitney, Nevada.

== Schedule ==
Date	Opponent	Site	Result	Attendance	Source
September 2	No. 21 Houston*	Sam Boyd Silver Bowl; Whitney, NV	L 0–69	22,416	
September 9	Weber State*	Sam Boyd Silver Bowl; Whitney, NV	W 16–12	17,718	
September 23	New Mexico State	Sam Boyd Silver Bowl; Whitney, NV	W 26–14	13,164	
September 30	at Cal State Fullerton	Santa Ana Stadium; Santa Ana, CA	L 20–34	3,900	
October 7	Pacific (CA)	Sam Boyd Silver Bowl; Whitney, NV	W 30–7	15,030	
October 21	at Northern Illinois*	Huskie Stadium; DeKalb, IL	L 24–42	16,352	
October 28	at Fresno State	Bulldog Stadium; Fresno, CA	L 17–31	32,302	
November 4	Long Beach State	Sam Boyd Silver Bowl; Whitney, NV	W 43–21	16,562	
November 11	at Nevada*	Mackay Stadium; Reno, NV (Fremont Cannon)	L 7–45	16,545	
November 18	Utah State	Sam Boyd Silver Bowl; Whitney, NV	L 22–27	17,710	
November 25	at San Jose State	Spartan Stadium; San Jose, CA	L 28–38	3,479	
*Non-conference game; Rankings from Coaches' Poll released prior to the game
