= 1989 Ohio Bobcats football team =

American college football season

1989 Ohio Bobcats football
- Conference: Mid-American Conference
- Record: 1–9–1 (1–6–1 MAC)
- Head coach: Cleve Bryant (5th season)
- Home stadium: Peden Stadium

1989 Mid-American Conference football standings
	Conf.					Overall
Team	W		L		T	W		L		T
Ball State $	6	–	1	–	1	7	–	3	–	2
Eastern Michigan	6	–	2	–	0	7	–	3	–	1
Toledo	6	–	2	–	0	6	–	5	–	0
Central Michigan	5	–	2	–	1	5	–	5	–	1
Bowling Green	5	–	3	–	0	5	–	6	–	0
Western Michigan	3	–	5	–	0	5	–	6	–	0
Miami (OH)	2	–	5	–	1	2	–	8	–	1
Ohio	1	–	6	–	1	1	–	9	–	1
Kent State	0	–	8	–	0	0	–	11	–	0
$ – Conference champion

The 1989 Ohio Bobcats football team was an American football team that represented Ohio University in the Mid-American Conference (MAC) during the 1989 NCAA Division I-A football season. In their fifth and final season under head coach Cleve Bryant, the Bobcats compiled a 1–9–1 record (1–6–1 against MAC opponents), finished in eighth place in the MAC, and were outscored by all opponents by a combined total of 349 to 191. They played their home games in Peden Stadium in Athens, Ohio.

== Schedule ==
Date	Opponent	Site	TV	Result	Attendance	Source
September 2	at Toledo	Glass Bowl; Toledo, OH		L 18–27	19,217	
September 9	at Iowa State*	Cyclone Stadium; Ames, IA		L 3–28	41,614	
September 16	Eastern Michigan	Peden Stadium; Athens, OH		L 25–30	11,000	
September 23	at Vanderbilt*	Vanderbilt Stadium; Nashville, TN		L 10–54	38,672	
September 30	at LSU*	Tiger Stadium; Baton Rouge, LA	PPV	L 6–57	63,860	
October 7	Bowling Green	Peden Stadium; Athens, OH		L 28–31		
October 14	at Miami (OH)	Yager Stadium; Oxford, OH (rivalry)		T 22–22		
October 21	Kent State	Peden Stadium; Athens, OH		W 37–14	16,205	
October 28	at Western Michigan	Waldo Stadium; Kalamazoo, MI		L 13–28	17,044	
November 11	at Central Michigan	Kelly/Shorts Stadium; Mount Pleasant, MI		L 15–24	9,861	
November 18	Ball State	Peden Stadium; Athens, OH		L 14–33	5,700	
*Non-conference game
