= 1989 UTEP Miners football team =

American college football season

1989 UTEP Miners football
- Conference: Western Athletic Conference
- Record: 2–10 (1–7 WAC)
- Head coach: David Lee (1st season)
- Offensive coordinator: David Culley (1st season)
- Defensive coordinator: Dave Dunkelberger (1st season)
- Home stadium: Sun Bowl

1989 Western Athletic Conference football standings
	Conf.					Overall
Team	W		L		T	W		L		T
No. 22 BYU $	7	–	1	–	0	10	–	3	–	0
Air Force	5	–	1	–	1	8	–	4	–	1
Hawaii	5	–	2	–	1	9	–	3	–	1
Wyoming	5	–	3	–	0	5	–	6	–	0
San Diego State	4	–	3	–	0	6	–	5	–	1
Colorado State	4	–	3	–	0	5	–	5	–	1
Utah	2	–	6	–	0	4	–	8	–	0
UTEP	1	–	7	–	0	2	–	10	–	0
New Mexico	0	–	7	–	0	2	–	10	–	0
$ – Conference champion; Rankings from AP Poll

The 1989 UTEP Miners football team was an American football team that represented the University of Texas at El Paso in the Western Athletic Conference during the 1989 NCAA Division I-A football season. In their first year under head coach David Lee, the team compiled a 2–10 record.

== Schedule ==
Date	Opponent	Site	Result	Attendance	Source
September 2	Tulsa*	Sun Bowl; El Paso, TX	L 14–23	38,065	
September 9	Lamar*	Sun Bowl; El Paso, TX	L 19–21	36,632	
September 16	at New Mexico State*	Aggie Memorial Stadium; Las Cruces, NM (rivalry)	W 29–27	25,823	
September 23	at Air Force	Falcon Stadium; Colorado Springs, CO	L 28–43	43,898	
September 30	at No. 8 Arkansas*	War Memorial Stadium; Little Rock, AR	L 7–39	48,240	
October 7	Utah	Sun Bowl; El Paso, TX	L 45–50	21,337	
October 14	New Mexico	Sun Bowl; El Paso, TX	W 26–7	21,059	
October 21	at No. 21 BYU	Cougar Stadium; Provo, UT	L 24–49	65,528	
October 28	San Diego State	Sun Bowl; El Paso, TX	L 31–34	17,070	
November 4	at Hawaii	Aloha Stadium; Halawa, HI	L 7–26	41,418	
November 11	Colorado State^{†}	Sun Bowl; El Paso, TX	L 0–52	28,977	
November 18	at Wyoming	War Memorial Stadium; Laramie, WY	L 10–41	15,624	
*Non-conference game; ^{†}Homecoming; Rankings from AP Poll released prior to the game
