= 1989 Miami Redskins football team =

American college football season

1989 Miami Redskins football
- Conference: Mid-American Conference
- Record: 2–8–1 (2–5–1 MAC)
- Head coach: Tim Rose (7th season)
- Offensive coordinator: Dana Bible (1st season)
- Home stadium: Yager Stadium

1989 Mid-American Conference football standings
	Conf.					Overall
Team	W		L		T	W		L		T
Ball State $	6	–	1	–	1	7	–	3	–	2
Eastern Michigan	6	–	2	–	0	7	–	3	–	1
Toledo	6	–	2	–	0	6	–	5	–	0
Central Michigan	5	–	2	–	1	5	–	5	–	1
Bowling Green	5	–	3	–	0	5	–	6	–	0
Western Michigan	3	–	5	–	0	5	–	6	–	0
Miami (OH)	2	–	5	–	1	2	–	8	–	1
Ohio	1	–	6	–	1	1	–	9	–	1
Kent State	0	–	8	–	0	0	–	11	–	0
$ – Conference champion

The 1989 Miami Redskins football team was an American football team that represented Miami University in the Mid-American Conference (MAC) during the 1989 NCAA Division I-A football season. In its seventh and final season under head coach Tim Rose, the team compiled a 2–8–1 record (2–5–1 against MAC opponents), finished in seventh place in the MAC, and were outscored by all opponents by a combined total of 262 to 122.

The team's statistical leaders included Joe Napoli with 1,988 passing yards, Chris Alexander with 551 rushing yards, and Milt Stegall with 426 receiving yards.

== Schedule ==
Date	Opponent	Site	Result	Attendance	Source
September 9	at Purdue*	Ross–Ade Stadium; West Lafayette, IN	L 10–27	38,840	
September 16	at Michigan State*	Spartan Stadium; East Lansing, MI	L 0–49	66,474	
September 23	Cincinnati*	Yager Stadium; Oxford, OH (rivalry)	L 14–30	19,447	
September 30	Central Michigan	Yager Stadium; Oxford, OH	L 7–20		
October 7	at Ball State	Ball State Stadium; Muncie, IN	L 9–37	15,625	
October 14	Ohio	Yager Stadium; Oxford, OH (rivalry)	T 22–22		
October 21	at Toledo	Glass Bowl; Toledo, OH	L 14–17	18,696	
October 28	Bowling Green	Yager Stadium; Oxford, OH	W 17–13	14,787	
November 4	at Eastern Michigan	Rynearson Stadium; Ypsilanti, MI	L 7–20	9,552	
November 11	at Kent State	Dix Stadium; Kent, OH	W 15–13	3,500	
November 18	Western Michigan	Yager Stadium; Oxford, OH	L 7–14		
*Non-conference game

== Roster ==
1989 Miami Redskins football team roster
Players
Coaches
Offense

Pos.	#	Name	Class
QB		Joe Napoli	Jr
G		John Sells	Jr
WR		Milt Stegall	So

Defense

Pos.	#	Name	Class
MG		Jeff Lick	So
DB		Dave Vestal	Jr

Special teams

Pos.	#	Name	Class

Head coach

- Tim Rose

Coordinators/assistant coaches

- Jim Fenwick
  (co-offensive line coach)

Legend

- (C) Team captain
- (S) Suspended
- (I) Ineligible
- Injured
- Redshirt
