= 1989 Air Force Falcons football team =

American college football season

1989 Air Force Falcons football
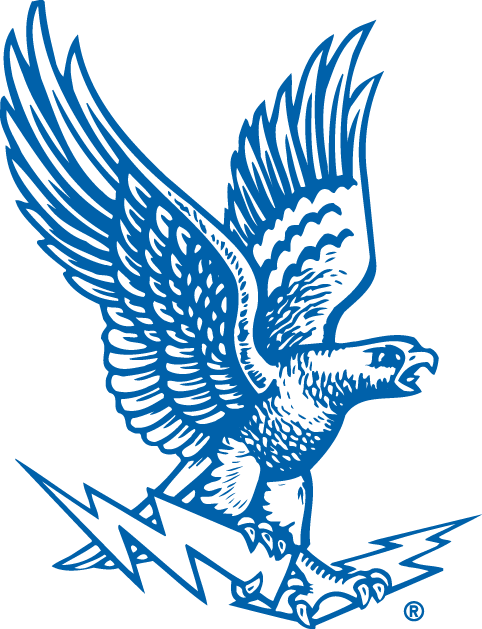

Liberty Bowl, L 29–42 vs. Ole Miss
- Conference: Western Athletic Conference
- Record: 8–4–1 (5–1–1 WAC)
- Head coach: Fisher DeBerry (6th season)
- Offensive scheme: Wishbone triple option
- Captains: Dee Dowis; Lance McDowell; Scott Hollister; Randall Gladney; Tom Kafka
- Home stadium: Falcon Stadium

1989 Western Athletic Conference football standings
	Conf.					Overall
Team	W		L		T	W		L		T
No. 22 BYU $	7	–	1	–	0	10	–	3	–	0
Air Force	5	–	1	–	1	8	–	4	–	1
Hawaii	5	–	2	–	1	9	–	3	–	1
Wyoming	5	–	3	–	0	5	–	6	–	0
San Diego State	4	–	3	–	0	6	–	5	–	1
Colorado State	4	–	3	–	0	5	–	5	–	1
Utah	2	–	6	–	0	4	–	8	–	0
UTEP	1	–	7	–	0	2	–	10	–	0
New Mexico	0	–	7	–	0	2	–	10	–	0
$ – Conference champion; Rankings from AP Poll

The 1989 Air Force Falcons football team represented the United States Air Force Academy in the 1989 NCAA Division I-A football season. In the Ram–Falcon Trophy match, the Falcons beat the Colorado State Rams to win the trophy.

== Schedule ==
Date	Opponent	Rank	Site	TV	Result	Attendance	Source
September 2	San Diego State		Falcon Stadium; Air Force Academy, CO		W 52–36	44,579	
September 10	Wyoming		Falcon Stadium; Air Force Academy, CO	ESPN	W 45–7	45,799	
September 16	at Northwestern*		Dyche Stadium; Evanston, IL		W 48–31	45,799	
September 23	UTEP		Falcon Stadium; Air Force Academy, CO		W 43–26	43,898	
September 30	at Colorado State	No. 24	Hughes Stadium; Fort Collins, CO (Ram–Falcon Trophy)		W 46–21	30,955	
October 7	at Navy*	No. 20	Navy–Marine Corps Memorial Stadium; Annapolis, MD		W 35-7	35,632	
October 14	No. 1 Notre Dame*	No. 17	Falcon Stadium; Air Force Academy, CO (rivalry)	ESPN	L 27–41	53,533	
October 21	at TCU*	No. 19	Amon G. Carter Stadium; Fort Worth, TX		L 9–27	23,593	
November 4	Army*		Falcon Stadium; Air Force Academy, CO		W 29–3	52,226	
November 11	at No. 21 BYU		Cougar Stadium; Provo, UT	CBS	L 35–44	66,089	
November 25	at Utah		Robert Rice Stadium; Salt Lake City, UT		W 42–38	20,119	
December 9	at No. 23 Hawaii		Aloha Stadium; Halawa, HI (rivalry)	ESPN	T 35–35	48,799	
December 28	vs. Ole Miss*		Liberty Bowl Memorial Stadium; Memphis, TN (Liberty Bowl)	FOX	L 29–42	60,128	
*Non-conference game; Rankings from AP Poll released prior to the game

== Game summaries ==
=== San Diego State ===
- Dee Dowis 13 Rush, 249 Yds, 6 TD

=== Notre Dame ===
#1 Notre Dame Fighting Irish (5–0) at #17 Air Force Falcons (6–0)

Quarter	1	2	3	4	Total
Notre Dame	14	21	3	3	41
Air Force	0	14	0	13	27

at Falcon Stadium, Colorado Springs, Colorado

- Date: October 14, 1989
- Game attendance: 53,533
- TV: ESPN
- Recap/Box Score

Game information

First quarter

- ND – Anthony Johnson 1-yard run (Craig Hentrich kick), 9:41. Notre Dame 7–0. Drive: 80 yards.
- ND – Ricky Watters 5-yard run (Craig Hentrich kick), 0:51. Notre Dame 14–0. Drive: 14 plays, 69 yards.

Second quarter

- ND – Raghib Ismail 56-yard punt return (Craig Hentrich kick), 14:42. Notre Dame 21–0.
- AFA – Greg Johnson 61-yard pass from Dee Dowis (Joe Wood kick), 13:36. Notre Dame 21–7.
- ND – Anthony Johnson 27-yard pass from Tony Rice (Craig Hentrich kick), 9:46. Notre Dame 28–7.
- AFA – Steve Senn 26-yard pass from Dee Dowis (Joe Wood kick). Notre Dame 28–14.
- ND – Raghib Ismail 24-yard run (Craig Hentrich kick), 0:30. Notre Dame 35–14.

Third quarter

- ND – Craig Hentrich 20-yard field goal, 8:24. Notre Dame 38–14.

Fourth quarter

- ND – Craig Hentrich 38-yard field goal, 12:42. Notre Dame 41–14.
- AFA – Steven Wilson 23-yard run (run failed), 9:35. Notre Dame 41–20.
- AFA – Rodney Lewis 1-yard run (Joe Wood kick), 3:22. Notre Dame 41–27.

Top passers

- ND – Tony Rice – 9/13, 123 yards, TD
- AFA – Dee Dowis – 15/24, 306 yards, 2 TD, INT

Top rushers

- ND – Ricky Watters – 11 rushes, 96 yards, TD
- AFA – Rodney Lewis – 13 rushes, 58 yards, TD

Top receivers

- ND – Raghib Ismail – 3 receptions, 25 yards
- AFA – Steve Senn – 6 receptions, 101 yards, TD

External videos
- 1989 Notre Dame at Air Force – Television broadcast

== Roster ==
1989 Air Force Falcons football team roster
Players
Coaches
Offense

Pos.	#	Name	Class
G	53	Kevin Bell
OT	67	Terry Carr
QB	6	Dee Dowis	Sr
RB	24	DeShawn Durham
RB	4	Ron Gray
OT	79	Scott Hollister
RB	34	Chris Howard
RB	40	Greg Johnson
FB	30	Jason Jones
WR	90	Lee Jones
QB	8	Charles Kuhl
RB	29	Rodney Lewis
QB	7	Lance McDowell
RB	37	Brian Neal
LB	16	Geoff Rich
WR	83	Steve Senn
WR	82	Trent Van Hulzen
C	56	Paul Walski
TE	85	Mark Weber
G	62	Steven Wilson
WR	17	Darryl Woods
RB	13	Ron Worthington
RB	49	Bill Wosilius
WR	11	Dan Zdroik

Defense

Pos.	#	Name	Class
DT	81	Lane Beene
DB	19	Mike Betance
DL	96	Steve Brennan
CB	27	Eric Faison
LB	45	Randle Gladney
LB	46	Brian Hill
DB	21	Mike Jurries
DL	75	Tom Kafka
CB	5	Bob Lietzke
FS	18	Mario Mathis
CB	3	Carlton McDonald	Fr
DL	61	Pat McNielis
LB		Vergil Simpson	Fr
LB	42	Terry Walker
LB	51	Doug Young

Special teams

Pos.	#	Name	Class
P	39	Eric Olson
K	2	Joe Wood

Head coach

- Fisher DeBerry

Coordinators/assistant coaches

Legend

- (C) Team captain
- (S) Suspended
- (I) Ineligible
- Injured
- Redshirt

== Awards and honors ==
Dee Dowis:

- Honorable Mention All-American (AP)
- WAC Offensive Player of the Year
- Sixth in Heisman Trophy voting

Lance McDowell:

- Bullard Award
