= 1989 Fresno State Bulldogs football team =

American college football season

1989 Fresno State Bulldogs football

Big West champion California Bowl champion

California Bowl, W 27–6 vs. Ball State
- Conference: Big West Conference
- Record: 11–1 (7–0 Big West)
- Head coach: Jim Sweeney (12th season)
- Home stadium: Bulldog Stadium

1989 Big West Conference football standings
	Conf.					Overall
Team	W		L		T	W		L		T
Fresno State $	7	–	0	–	0	11	–	1	–	0
Cal State Fullerton	5	–	2	–	0	6	–	4	–	1
San Jose State	5	–	2	–	0	6	–	5	–	0
Utah State	4	–	3	–	0	4	–	7	–	0
UNLV	3	–	4	–	0	4	–	7	–	0
Long Beach State	2	–	5	–	0	4	–	8	–	0
Pacific (CA)	2	–	5	–	0	2	–	10	–	0
New Mexico State	0	–	7	–	0	0	–	11	–	0
$ – Conference champion

The 1989 Fresno State Bulldogs football team represented California State University, Fresno as a member of the Big West Conference during the 1989 NCAA Division I-A football season. Led by 12th-year head coach Jim Sweeney, Fresno State compiled an overall record of 11–1 with a mark of 7–0 in conference play, winning the Big West title for the second consecutive season. The Bulldogs played their home games at Bulldog Stadium in Fresno, California.

Fresno State earned their fourth NCAA Division I-A postseason bowl game berth in 1989. They played the Mid-American Conference (MAC) champion Ball State Cardinals in the ninth annual California Bowl at Bulldog Stadium on December 9. The Bulldogs won their third consecutive bowl game by beating Ball State, 27–6.

== Schedule ==
Date	Opponent	Rank	Site	Result	Attendance	Source
September 2	Utah*		Bulldog Stadium; Fresno, CA	W 52–22	34,926	
September 9	Montana*		Bulldog Stadium; Fresno, CA	W 52–37	33,710	
September 16	at Pacific (CA)		Stagg Memorial Stadium; Stockton, CA	W 27–14	4,735	
September 23	Long Beach State		Bulldog Stadium; Fresno, CA	W 52–0	35,102	
October 7	Oregon State*		Bulldog Stadium; Fresno, CA	W 35–18	35,164	
October 14	at Utah State		Romney Stadium; Logan, UT	W 34–7	13,147	
October 21	Cal State Fullerton		Bulldog Stadium; Fresno, CA	W 33–19	32,135	
October 28	UNLV		Bulldog Stadium; Fresno, CA	W 31–17	32,302	
November 4	San Jose State	No. 25	Bulldog Stadium; Fresno, CA (rivalry)	W 31–30	35,353	
November 11	at New Mexico State	No. 24	Aggie Memorial Stadium; Las Cruces, NM	W 45–5	4,826	
November 18	at New Mexico*	No. 23	University Stadium; Albuquerque, NM	L 22–45	12,668	
December 9	Ball State*		Bulldog Stadium; Fresno, CA (California Bowl)	W 27–6	31,610	
*Non-conference game; Rankings from AP Poll released prior to the game

== Team players in the NFL ==
The following were selected in the 1990 NFL draft.

Player	Position	Round	Overall	NFL team
James Williams	Defensive back	1	16	Buffalo Bills
Ron Cox	Linebacker	2	33	Chicago Bears
Dwight Pickens	Wide receiver	8	220	San Francisco 49ers
Terry Cook	Defensive end	9	224	Tampa Bay Buccaneers
Myron Jones	Defensive back	11	304	Los Angeles Raiders

The following finished their college career in 1989, were not drafted, but played in the NFL.

Player	Position	First NFL team
Rich Bartlewski	Tight end	1990 Los Angeles Raiders
