= Dale Dawkins =

American football player (born 1966)

No. 89
- Position: Wide receiver

Personal information
- Born: October 30, 1966 (age 60); Vero Beach, Florida, U.S.
- Listed height: 6 ft 1 in (1.85 m)
- Listed weight: 190 lb (86 kg)

Career information
- High school: Vero Beach
- College: Miami (FL)
- NFL draft: 1990: 9th round, 223rd overall pick

Career history
- New York Jets (1990–1993)

Awards and highlights
- 2× National champion (1987, 1989); 1989 2nd team All-South Independent Football

Career NFL statistics
- Receptions: 8
- Receiving yards: 106
- Stats at Pro Football Reference

Dale V. Dawkins (born October 30, 1966) is an American former professional football player who was a wide receiver for the New York Jets of the National Football League (NFL). He played college football for the Miami Hurricanes.

== College career ==
Dawkins played football at the University of Miami from 1987 to 1989 as a wide receiver.

- 1987: Two catches for 20 yards
- 1988: 31 catches for 488 yards and three touchdowns
- 1989: 54 catches for 833 yards and seven touchdowns

== Professional career ==
Dawkins was selected by the New York Jets in the ninth round of the 1990 NFL draft. He was selected 223rd overall. As a rookie, he had just 5 catches for 68 yards. In 1991, he had 3 catches for 38 yards. He only played in 10 more games through the 1993 NFL season.
