= 1989 Holiday Bowl =

1989 SeaWorld Holiday Bowl
Penn State Nittany Lions	BYU Cougars
(7–3–1)	(10–2)
Independent	WAC
50	39
Head coach: Joe Paterno	Head coach: LaVell Edwards
AP / Coaches; 18 / 18	AP / Coaches; 19 / 16
	1	2	3	4	Total
Penn State	3	9	17	21	50
BYU	3	10	13	13	39
- Date: December 30, 1989
- Season: 1989
- Stadium: Jack Murphy Stadium
- Location: San Diego, California
- MVP: Co-Offensive: Ty Detmer (BYU); Co-Offensive: Blair Thomas (Penn State)
- Halftime show: Marching bands
- Attendance: 61,113
- Payout: US$1,109,038 per team

United States TV coverage
- Network: ESPN
- Announcers: Tim Brando, Vince Dooley and Jerry Punch

The 1989 Holiday Bowl was a college football bowl game played December 30, 1989, at Qualcomm Stadium in San Diego, California. It was part of the 1989 NCAA Division I-A football season. It featured the Penn State Nittany Lions and BYU Cougars.

== Game summary ==
- Penn State - Tarasi 30 yard field goal
- BYU - Chaffetz 20 yard field goal
- Penn State - Smith 24 touchdown yard pass from Sacca (kick failed)
- BYU - Detmer 1 touchdown yard run (Chaffetz kick)
- Penn State - Tarasi 36 yard field goal
- BYU - Chaffetz 22 yard field goal
- Penn State - Tarasi 51 yard field goal
- Penn State - Thompson 16 yard touchdown run (Tarasi kick)
- BYU - Detmer 1 yard touchdown run (kick failed)
- Penn State - Thompson 14 yard touchdown run (Tarasi kick)
- BYU - Boyce 12 yard touchdown pass from Detmer (Chaffetz kick)
- Penn State - Thomas 7 yard touchdown run (run failed)
- Penn State - Daniels 52 yard touchdown pass from Sacca (pass failed)
- BYU - Whittingham 10 yard touchdown run (Chaffetz kick)
- BYU - Nyberg 3 yard touchdown yard pass from Detmer (pass failed)
- Penn State - Collins 2-point conversion interception return
- Penn State - Brown 53 yard touchdown fumble return (kick)

BYU quarterback Ty Detmer was marching the Cougars toward a game-winning touchdown in the closing seconds when he had the ball stripped by Penn State's Gary Brown, who returned it 53 yards for a touchdown to seal the Nittany Lions victory.

Stealing the ball before Detmer could throw it was the only way he could be stopped by the Penn State defense. Detmer completed 42 of 59 passes for 576 yards, all Holiday Bowl records, and shared Offensive MVP honors with Penn State running back Blair Thomas, who rushed for a Holiday Bowl record 35 times for 186 yards.
