= 1989 Utah Utes football team =

American college football season

1989 Utah Utes football
- Conference: Western Athletic Conference
- Record: 4–8 (2–6 WAC)
- Head coach: Jim Fassel (5th season)
- Offensive coordinator: Jack Reilly (5th season)
- Defensive coordinator: Tom Gadd (9th season)
- Home stadium: Robert Rice Stadium

1989 Western Athletic Conference football standings
	Conf.					Overall
Team	W		L		T	W		L		T
No. 22 BYU $	7	–	1	–	0	10	–	3	–	0
Air Force	5	–	1	–	1	8	–	4	–	1
Hawaii	5	–	2	–	1	9	–	3	–	1
Wyoming	5	–	3	–	0	5	–	6	–	0
San Diego State	4	–	3	–	0	6	–	5	–	1
Colorado State	4	–	3	–	0	5	–	5	–	1
Utah	2	–	6	–	0	4	–	8	–	0
UTEP	1	–	7	–	0	2	–	10	–	0
New Mexico	0	–	7	–	0	2	–	10	–	0
$ – Conference champion; Rankings from AP Poll

The 1989 Utah Utes football team represented the University of Utah as a member of the Western Athletic Conference (WAC) during the 1989 NCAA Division I-A football season. In their fifth and final season under head coach Jim Fassel, the Utes compiled an overall record of 4–8 record with a mark of 2–6 against conference opponents, finished in seventh place in the WAC, and were outscored by their opponents 524 to 365. The team played home games at Robert Rice Stadium in Salt Lake City.

Utah's statistical leaders included Scott Mitchell with 3,211 passing yards, Clifton Smith with 681 rushing yards, and Dennis Smith with 1,091 receiving yards.

== Schedule ==
Date	Time	Opponent	Site	Result	Attendance	Source
September 2	8:00 pm	at Fresno State	Bulldog Stadium; Fresno, CA	L 22–52	34,926	
September 9	7:05 pm	Utah State*	Robert Rice Stadium; Salt Lake City, UT (Battle of the Brothers)	W 45–10	30,948	
September 16	12:30 pm	at No. 4 Nebraska*	Memorial Stadium; Lincoln, NE	L 30–42	76,333	
September 23	11:05 pm	at Hawaii	Aloha Stadium; Halawa, HI	L 20–67	42,417	
September 30	8:05 pm	San Diego State	Robert Rice Stadium; Salt Lake City, UT	L 27–38	29,585	
October 7	7:05 pm	at UTEP	Sun Bowl; El Paso, TX	W 50–45	21,337	
October 14	1:00 pm	at Wyoming	War Memorial Stadium; Laramie, WY	L 24–45	24,139	
October 21	2:00 pm	at Stanford*	Stanford Stadium; Stanford, CA	W 27–24	15,000	
October 28	12:00 pm	Colorado State^{†}	Robert Rice Stadium; Salt Lake City, UT	L 10–50	21,389	
November 11	12:00 pm	New Mexico	Robert Rice Stadium; Salt Lake City, UT	W 41–39	21,025	
November 18	12:00 pm	at No. 21 BYU	Cougar Stadium; Provo, UT (Holy War)	L 31–70	66,110	
November 25	12:00 pm	Air Force	Robert Rice Stadium; Salt Lake City, UT	L 38–42	20,119	
*Non-conference game; ^{†}Homecoming; Rankings from AP Poll released prior to the game; All times are in Mountain time

== Game summaries ==
=== At BYU ===
Utah Utes (4–6) at #21 BYU Cougars (8–2)

Quarter	1	2	3	4	Total
Utah	0	7	3	21	31
BYU	28	21	14	7	70

at Cougar Stadium, Provo, Utah

- Date: November 18, 1989
- Game weather: Hazy, 44 °F (7 °C)
- Game attendance: 66,110
- Box Score

Team	Category	Player	Statistics
Utah	Passing	Mike Richmond	28/44, 393 Yds, 4 TD
Utah	Rushing	Steve Abrams	21 Rush, 94 Yds
Utah	Receiving	Darrel Hicks	11 Rec, 126 Yds, 3 TD
BYU	Passing	Ty Detmer	18/22, 358 Yds, 4 TD
BYU	Rushing	Stacey Corley	14 Rush, 159 Yds, TD
BYU	Receiving	Chris Smith	6 Rec, 194 Yds, TD

Scoring summary

Quarter	Time	Drive			Team	Scoring information	Score	
Quarter	Time	Plays	Yards	TOP	Team	Scoring information	UTAH	BYU
1					BYU	Matt Bellini 18-yard touchdown reception from Ty Detmer, Jason Chaffetz kick good	0	7
1					BYU	Ty Detmer 7-yard touchdown run, Jason Chaffetz kick good	0	14
1					BYU	Fred Whittingham 6-yard touchdown run, Jason Chaffetz kick good	0	21
1					BYU	Jeff Frandsen 9-yard touchdown reception from Ty Detmer, Jason Chaffetz kick good	0	28
2					BYU	Fred Whittingham 6-yard touchdown run, Jason Chaffetz kick good	0	35
2					BYU	Chris Smith 76-yard touchdown reception from Ty Detmer, Jason Chaffetz kick good	0	42
2					BYU	Matt Odle 11-yard touchdown reception from Ty Detmer, Jason Chaffetz kick good	0	49
2					Utah	Darrel Hicks 12-yard touchdown reception from Mike Richmond, Wayne Lammle kick good	7	49
3					Utah	29-yard field goal by Wayne Lammle	10	49
3					BYU	Fred Whittingham 5-yard touchdown run, Jason Chaffetz kick good	10	56
3					BYU	Stacey Corley 81-yard touchdown run, Jason Chaffetz kick good	10	63
4					Utah	Darrel Hicks 3-yard touchdown reception from Mike Richmond, Wayne Lammle kick good	17	63
4					Utah	Darrel Hicks 27-yard touchdown reception from Mike Richmond, Wayne Lammle kick good	24	63
4					Utah	Dennis Smith 7-yard touchdown reception from Mike Richmond, Wayne Lammle kick good	31	63
4					BYU	Peter Tuipulotu 29-yard touchdown run, Jason Chaffetz kick good	31	70
"TOP" = time of possession. For other American football terms, see Glossary of American football.							31	70

== Personnel ==
1989 Utah Utes football team roster
Players
Coaches
Offense

Pos.	#	Name	Class
QB	19	Scott Mitchell	Jr
QB		Mike Richmond

Defense

Pos.	#	Name	Class

Special teams

Pos.	#	Name	Class
K		Wayne Lammle

Head coach

- Jim Fassel

Coordinators/assistant coaches

Legend

- (C) Team captain
- (S) Suspended
- (I) Ineligible
- Injured
- Redshirt

=== NFL draft ===
One Utah player was selected in the 1990 NFL draft.

Player	Position	Round	Pick	NFL team
Scott Mitchell	Quarterback	4	94	Miami Dolphins
