= 1989 New Mexico Lobos football team =

American college football season

1989 New Mexico Lobos football
- Conference: Western Athletic Conference
- Record: 2–10 (0–7 WAC)
- Head coach: Mike Sheppard (3rd season)
- Offensive coordinator: Steve Fairchild (1st season)
- Defensive coordinator: Denny Moller (1st season)
- Home stadium: University Stadium

1989 Western Athletic Conference football standings
	Conf.					Overall
Team	W		L		T	W		L		T
No. 22 BYU $	7	–	1	–	0	10	–	3	–	0
Air Force	5	–	1	–	1	8	–	4	–	1
Hawaii	5	–	2	–	1	9	–	3	–	1
Wyoming	5	–	3	–	0	5	–	6	–	0
San Diego State	4	–	3	–	0	6	–	5	–	1
Colorado State	4	–	3	–	0	5	–	5	–	1
Utah	2	–	6	–	0	4	–	8	–	0
UTEP	1	–	7	–	0	2	–	10	–	0
New Mexico	0	–	7	–	0	2	–	10	–	0
$ – Conference champion; Rankings from AP Poll

The 1989 New Mexico Lobos football team was an American football team that represented the University of New Mexico in the Western Athletic Conference (WAC) during the 1989 NCAA Division I-A football season. In their third season under head coach Mike Sheppard, the Lobos compiled a 2–10 record (0–7 against WAC opponents) and were outscored by a total of 378 to 298.

The team's statistical leaders included Jeremy Leach with 3,573 passing yards, Dion Morrow with 664 rushing yards, and Terance Mathis with 1,315 receiving yards and 96 points scored.

== Schedule ==
Date	Opponent	Site	Result	Attendance	Source
September 2	No. 19 BYU	University Stadium; Albuquerque, NM	L 3–24	27,045	
September 9	New Mexico State*	University Stadium; Albuquerque, NM (rivalry)	W 45–13	25,537	
September 16	at Texas Tech*	Jones Stadium; Lubbock, TX	L 20–27	27,535	
September 23	at Tulsa*	Skelly Stadium; Skelly Stadium	L 33–35	19,382	
September 30	at Hawaii	Aloha Stadium; Halawa, HI	L 14–60	38,345	
October 7	Colorado State	University Stadium; Albuquerque, NM	L 20–34	18,345	
October 14	at UTEP	Sun Bowl; El Paso, TX	L 7–26	21,059	
October 21	at No. 20 Florida*	Ben Hill Griffin Stadium; Gainesville, FL	L 21–27	72,578	
October 28	Wyoming^{†}	University Stadium; Albuquerque, NM	L 23–24	20,033	
November 4	at San Diego State	Jack Murphy Stadium; San Diego, CA	L 28–45	13,776	
November 11	at Utah	Robert Rice Stadium; Salt Lake City, UT	L 39–41	21,025	
November 18	No. 23 Fresno State*	University Stadium; Albuquerque, NM	W 45–22	12,668	
*Non-conference game; ^{†}Homecoming; Rankings from AP Poll released prior to the game
