= 1989 Miami Hurricanes football team =

American college football season

1989 Miami Hurricanes football

Consensus national champion Sugar Bowl champion

Sugar Bowl, W 33–25 vs. Alabama
- Conference: Independent

Ranking
- Coaches: No. 1
- AP: No. 1
- Record: 11–1
- Head coach: Dennis Erickson (1st season)
- Offensive coordinator: Bob Bratkowski (1st season)
- Offensive scheme: One-back spread
- Defensive coordinator: Sonny Lubick (1st season)
- Base defense: 4–3
- MVP: Cortez Kennedy
- Home stadium: Miami Orange Bowl

1989 NCAA Division I-A independents football records
| | Conf. | | | Overall |
| Team | W | L | T | W | | L | | T |
|---|---|---|---|---|---|---|---|---|
| No. 1 Miami (FL) | | – | | 11 | – | 1 | – | 0 |
| No. 2 Notre Dame | | – | | 12 | – | 1 | – | 0 |
| No. 3 Florida State | | – | | 10 | – | 2 | – | 0 |
| Northern Illinois | | – | | 9 | – | 2 | – | 0 |
| No. 15 Penn State | | – | | 8 | – | 3 | – | 1 |
| No. 17 Pittsburgh | | – | | 8 | – | 3 | – | 1 |
| No. 21 West Virginia | | – | | 8 | – | 3 | – | 1 |
| Syracuse | | – | | 8 | – | 4 | – | 0 |
| Southwestern Louisiana | | – | | 7 | – | 4 | – | 0 |
| Akron | | – | | 6 | – | 4 | – | 1 |
| South Carolina | | – | | 6 | – | 4 | – | 1 |
| Virginia Tech | | – | | 6 | – | 4 | – | 1 |
| Louisiana Tech | | – | | 5 | – | 4 | – | 1 |
| Army | | – | | 6 | – | 5 | – | 0 |
| Louisville | | – | | 6 | – | 5 | – | 0 |
| East Carolina | | – | | 5 | – | 5 | – | 1 |
| Tulsa | | – | | 6 | – | 6 | – | 0 |
| Southern Miss | | – | | 5 | – | 6 | – | 0 |
| Tulane | | – | | 4 | – | 8 | – | 0 |
| Navy | | – | | 3 | – | 8 | – | 0 |
| Rutgers | | – | | 2 | – | 7 | – | 2 |
| Boston College | | – | | 2 | – | 9 | – | 0 |
| Memphis State | | – | | 2 | – | 9 | – | 0 |
| Cincinnati | | – | | 1 | – | 9 | – | 1 |
| Temple | | – | | 1 | – | 10 | – | 0 |
Rankings from AP Poll

The 1989 Miami Hurricanes football team represented the University of Miami as an independent during the 1989 NCAA Division I-A football season. It was the Hurricanes' 64th season of football. The Hurricanes were led by first-year head coach Dennis Erickson and played their home games at the Orange Bowl. They finished the season 11–1 overall. They were invited to the Sugar Bowl where they defeated Alabama, 33–25, to win the program's third national championship.

== Schedule ==
| Date | Opponent | Rank | Site | TV | Result | Attendance | Source |
|---|---|---|---|---|---|---|---|
| September 9 | at Wisconsin | No. 3 | Camp Randall Stadium; Madison, WI | ABC | W 51–3 | 38,646 | |
| September 16 | California | No. 3 | Miami Orange Bowl; Miami, FL | ESPN | W 31–3 | 56,931 | |
| September 23 | at Missouri | No. 2 | Faurot Field; Columbia, MO | Prime | W 38–7 | 43,293 | |
| September 30 | at Michigan State | No. 2 | Spartan Stadium; East Lansing, MI | ABC | W 26–20 | 76,217 | |
| October 7 | Cincinnati | No. 2 | Miami Orange Bowl; Miami, FL | | W 56–0 | 48,597 | |
| October 14 | San Jose State | No. 2 | Miami Orange Bowl; Miami, FL | | W 48–16 | 45,122 | |
| October 28 | at No. 9 Florida State | No. 2 | Doak Campbell Stadium; Tallahassee, FL (rivalry) | ESPN | L 10–24 | 62,602 | |
| November 4 | East Carolina | No. 7 | Miami Orange Bowl; Miami, FL | | W 40–10 | 35,159 | |
| November 11 | at No. 14 Pittsburgh | No. 7 | Pitt Stadium; Pittsburgh, PA | CBS | W 24–3 | 52,528 | |
| November 18 | San Diego State^{†} | No. 7 | Miami Orange Bowl; Miami, FL | | W 42–6 | 42,362 | |
| November 25 | No. 1 Notre Dame | No. 7 | Miami Orange Bowl; Miami, FL (rivalry) | CBS | W 27–10 | 81,634 | |
| January 1 | vs. No. 7 Alabama | No. 2 | Louisiana Superdome; New Orleans, LA (Sugar Bowl) | ABC | W 33–25 | 77,452 | |
^{†}Homecoming; Rankings from AP Poll released prior to the game

== Rankings ==
Ranking movements Legend: ██ Increase in ranking ██ Decrease in ranking ( ) = First-place votes
| | Week | | | | | | | | | | | | | | | | |
| Poll | Pre | 1 | 2 | 3 | 4 | 5 | 6 | 7 | 8 | 9 | 10 | 11 | 12 | 13 | 14 | 15 | Final |
|---|---|---|---|---|---|---|---|---|---|---|---|---|---|---|---|---|---|
| AP | 4 (4) | 3 (4) | 3 (5) | 2 (3) | 2 (3) | 2 (3) | 2 (4) | 2 (3) | 2 (3) | 7 | 7 | 7 | 7 | 4 (3) | 2 (4) | 2 (4) | 1 (38) |
| Coaches | 5 (1) | 5 (1) | 2 (2) | 2 (3) | 2 (4) | 2 (2) | 2 (5) | 2 (5) | 2 (3) | 6 | 7 | 7 | 7 | 3 (3) | 2 (4) | | 1 (36) |

== Game summaries ==
=== At Wisconsin ===
#3 Miami (FL) at Wisconsin

| Team | 1 | 2 | 3 | 4 | Total |
|---|---|---|---|---|---|
| • Hurricanes | 13 | 21 | 10 | 7 | 51 |
| Badgers | 3 | 0 | 0 | 0 | 3 |

- Date: September 9
- Location: Camp Randall Stadium, Madison, Wisconsin
- Game attendance: 38,646
- TV announcers (ABC): Keith Jackson, Bob Griese, Mike Adamle

Scoring summary
| 1 | | WIS | Thompson 38-yard field goal | WIS 3–0 |
| 1 | | MIA | Huerta 28-yard field goal | Tied 3–3 |
| 1 | | MIA | Huerta 43-yard field goal | MIA 6–3 |
| 1 | | MIA | Conley 1-yard run (Huerta kick) | MIA 13–3 |
| 2 | | MIA | Carroll 15-yard pass from Erickson (Huerta kick) | MIA 20–3 |
| 2 | | MIA | Carroll 10-yard pass from Erickson (Huerta kick) | MIA 27–3 |
| 2 | | MIA | Hill 3-yard pass from Erickson (Huerta kick) | MIA 34–3 |
| 3 | | MIA | Huerta 24-yard field goal | MIA 37–3 |
| 3 | | MIA | Aaron 3-yard pass from Erickson (Huerta kick) | MIA 44–3 |
| 4 | 7:57 | MIA | Kevin Gibbs 6-yard run (Huerta kick) | MIA 51–3 |

=== California ===
California at #3 Miami (FL)

| Team | 1 | 2 | 3 | 4 | Total |
|---|---|---|---|---|---|
| Golden Bears | 3 | 0 | 0 | 0 | 3 |
| • Hurricanes | 0 | 17 | 7 | 7 | 31 |

- Date: September 16
- Location: Miami Orange Bowl, Miami, Florida
- Game attendance: 56,931
- Game weather: 93 °F (34 °C), Partly cloudy, Wind S 15 mph (24 km/h)
- TV announcers (ESPN): Tim Brando, Gene Washington

Scoring summary
| 1 | 7:45 | CAL | Robbie Keen 45-yard field goal | CAL 3–0 |
| 2 | | MIA | Huerta 29-yard field goal | Tied 3–3 |
| 2 | 4:48 | MIA | Conley 6-yard run (Huerta kick) | MIA 10–3 |
| 2 | 2:10 | MIA | Crowell 2-yard pass from Erickson (Huerta kick) | MIA 17–3 |
| 3 | 0:11 | MIA | Dawkins 18-yard pass from Erickson (Huerta kick) | MIA 24–3 |
| 4 | 12:46 | MIA | Hill 33-yard pass from Erickson (Huerta kick) | MIA 31–3 |

=== At Missouri ===
#2 Miami (FL) at Missouri

| Team | 1 | 2 | 3 | 4 | Total |
|---|---|---|---|---|---|
| • Hurricanes | 7 | 17 | 0 | 14 | 38 |
| Tigers | 7 | 0 | 0 | 0 | 7 |

- Date: September 23
- Location: Faurot Field, Columbia, Missouri
- Game attendance: 43,293
- Game weather: 59 °F (15 °C), Sunny, Wind N 10–15 mph (16–24 km/h)
- TV announcers (Prime): Dave Armstrong, Dave Logan

Scoring summary
| 1 | 3:24 | MIA | Maurice Crum 30-yard interception return (Huerta kick) | MIA 7–0 |
| 1 | 1:16 | MIZ | Collins 67-yard pass from Keifer (Baker kick) | Tied 7–7 |
| 2 | 12:28 | MIA | Crowell 1-yard run (Huerta kick) | MIA 14–7 |
| 2 | 1:36 | MIA | Huerta 42-yard field goal | MIA 17–7 |
| 2 | 0:07 | MIA | Erickson 6-yard run (Huerta kick) | MIA 24–7 |
| 4 | 9:28 | MIA | Conley 2-yard run (Huerta kick) | MIA 31–7 |
| 4 | 8:34 | MIA | Chudzinski 30-yard pass from Erickson (Huerta kick) | MIA 38–7 |

=== At Michigan State ===
#2 Miami (FL) at Michigan State

| Team | 1 | 2 | 3 | 4 | Total |
|---|---|---|---|---|---|
| • Hurricanes | 3 | 7 | 10 | 6 | 26 |
| Spartans | 3 | 7 | 3 | 7 | 20 |

- Date: September 30
- Location: Spartan Stadium, East Lansing, Michigan
- Game attendance: 76,217
- Referee: Jim Kemerling
- TV announcers (ABC): Gary Bender, Dick Vermeil, Cheryl Miller

Scoring summary
| 1 | 7:56 | MIA | Huerta 32-yard field goal | MIA 3–0 |
| 1 | 3:59 | MSU | Langeloh 46-yard field goal | Tied 3–3 |
| 2 | 5:32 | MSU | Enos 19-yard run (Langeloh kick) | MSU 10–3 |
| 2 | 2:14 | MIA | Carroll 5-yard pass from Torretta (Huerta kick) | Tied 10–10 |
| 3 | 11:52 | MIA | Johnson 38-yard run (Huerta kick) | MIA 17–10 |
| 3 | 6:42 | MIA | Huerta 27-yard field goal | MIA 20–10 |
| 3 | 2:48 | MSU | Langeloh 27-yard field goal | MIA 20–13 |
| 4 | | MSU | Harlon Barnett 35-yard interception return | Tied 20–20 |
| 4 | 5:04 | MIA | Huerta 27-yard field goal | MIA 23–20 |
| 4 | 0:54 | MIA | Huerta 52-yard field goal | MIA 26–20 |

=== Cincinnati ===
Cincinnati at #3 Miami (FL)

| Team | 1 | 2 | 3 | 4 | Total |
|---|---|---|---|---|---|
| Bearcats | 0 | 0 | 0 | 0 | 0 |
| • Hurricanes | 7 | 35 | 7 | 7 | 56 |

- Date: October 7
- Location: Orange Bowl, Miami, Florida
- Game attendance: 48,597

=== San Jose State ===
San Jose State at #3 Miami (FL)

| Team | 1 | 2 | 3 | 4 | Total |
|---|---|---|---|---|---|
| Spartans | 0 | 8 | 0 | 8 | 16 |
| • Hurricanes | 10 | 7 | 17 | 14 | 48 |

- Date: October 14
- Location: Orange Bowl, Miami, Florida

Backup Gino Torretta, making his second consecutive start for the injured Craig Erickson, threw for a school-record 468 yards and 3 touchdowns. The Hurricanes picked up their 48th win in 49 games.

=== At Florida State ===
#2 Miami (FL) Hurricanes at #9 Florida State Seminoles

| Quarter | 1 | 2 | 3 | 4 | Total |
|---|---|---|---|---|---|
| Miami (FL) | 10 | 0 | 0 | 0 | 10 |
| Florida St | 14 | 0 | 7 | 3 | 24 |

at Doak Campbell Stadium, Tallahassee, Florida

- Date: October 28, 1989
- Game time: 8:00 p.m. EST
- Game attendance: 62,602
- TV announcers (ESPN): Ron Franklin and Kevin Kiley
- Recap/Box Score

Game information

First quarter

- FSU – Dexter Carter 37-yard run (Richie Andrews kick), 14:37. Florida St 7–0. Drive:
- MIA – Randal Hill 8-yard pass from Gino Torretta (Carlos Huerta kick), 9:57. Tie 7–7. Drive: 80 yards.
- FSU – Edgar Bennett 1-yard run (Richie Andrews kick), 5:11. Florida St 14–7. Drive: 82 yards.
- MIA – Carlos Huerta 44-yard field goal, 1:09. Florida St 14–10. Drive:

Third quarter

- FSU – Amp Lee 1-yard run (Richie Andrews kick), 2:20. Florida St 21–10. Drive:

Fourth quarter

- FSU – Richie Andrews 41-yard field goal, 14:18. 'Florida St 24–10. Drive:

Top passers

- MIA – Gino Torretta – TD, 4 INT
- FSU – Peter Tom Willis – 7/20, 129 yards, INT

Top rushers

- MIA –
- FSU – Dexter Carter – 21 rushes, 142 yards, TD

Top receivers

- MIA –
- FSU – Ronald Lewis – 3 receptions, 77 yards

Prior to the Miami-Florida State game, University of Miami mascot Sebastian the Ibis was tackled by a group of police officers for attempting to put out Chief Osceola's flaming spear. Sebastian was wearing a fireman's helmet and yellow raincoat and holding a fire extinguisher. When a police officer attempted to grab the fire extinguisher, the officer was sprayed in the chest. Sebastian was handcuffed by four officers but ultimately released. Miami quarterback Gino Torretta, who started the game in place of injured Craig Erickson, told ESPN, "Even if we weren't bad boys, it added to the mystique that, 'Man, look, even their mascot's getting arrested.'"

=== At Pittsburgh ===
#7 Miami (FL) at #14 Pittsburgh

| Team | 1 | 2 | 3 | 4 | Total |
|---|---|---|---|---|---|
| • Hurricanes | 10 | 3 | 9 | 2 | 24 |
| Panthers | 0 | 0 | 0 | 3 | 3 |

- Date: November 11
- Location: Pitt Stadium, Pittsburgh, Pennsylvania
- Game attendance: 52,528
- Game weather: 49 °F (9 °C), Light rain, Wind SSW 14 mph (23 km/h)
- TV announcers (CBS): Jim Nantz, Pat Haden, John Dockery

Scoring summary
| 1 | 10:38 | MIA | Huerta 20-yard field goal | MIA 3–0 |
| 1 | | MIA | McGuire 8-yard run (Huerta kick) | MIA 10–0 |
| 2 | | MIA | Huerta 27-yard field goal | MIA 13–0 |
| 3 | | MIA | Huerta 27-yard field goal | MIA 16–0 |
| 3 | | MIA | Dawkins 9-yard pass from Erickson (pass failed) | MIA 22–0 |
| 4 | 12:06 | PITT | Frazier 29-yard field goal | MIA 22–3 |
| 4 | 10:19 | MIA | Safety, Van Pelt tackled in end zone | MIA 24–3 |

=== Notre Dame ===
#1 Notre Dame Fighting Irish (11–0) at #7 Miami (FL) Hurricanes (9–1)

| Quarter | 1 | 2 | 3 | 4 | Total |
|---|---|---|---|---|---|
| Notre Dame | 0 | 10 | 0 | 0 | 10 |
| Miami (FL) | 10 | 7 | 7 | 3 | 27 |

at Orange Bowl, Miami, Florida

- Date: November 25, 1989
- Game weather: Overcast, 77 °F (25 °C)
- Game attendance: 81,634
- Referee: Jimmy Harper
- TV announcers (CBS): Jim Nantz, Pat Haden, and John Dockery
- Recap/Box

Game information

'First quarter

- UM – Carlos Huerta 35-yard field goal, 9:41. Miami (FL) 3–0.
- UM – Dale Dawkins 55-yard pass from Craig Erickson (Carlos Huerta kick), 0:04. Miami (FL) 10–0. Drive: 4 plays.

Second quarter

- ND – Billy Hackett 22-yard field goal, 8:23. Miami (FL) 10–3.
- ND – Ned Bolcar 49-yard interception return (Billy Hackett kick), 2:08. Tie 10–10.
- UM – Stephen McGuire 5-yard run (Carlos Huerta kick), 0:24. Miami (FL) 17–10. Drive: 3 plays.

Third quarter

- UM – Dale Dawkins 5-yard pass from Craig Erickson (Carlos Huerta kick), 4:13. Miami (FL) 24–10. Drive: 22 plays, 80 yards, 10:47.

Fourth quarter

- UM – Carlos Huerta 32-yard field goal, 1:44. Miami (FL) 27–10.

Top passers

- ND – Tony Rice – 7/15, 106 yards, 2 INT
- UM – Craig Erickson – 16/26, 210 yards, 2 TD

Top rushers

- ND – Tony Rice – 20 rushes, 50 yards
- UM – Stephen McGuire – 21 rushes, 83 yards, TD

Top receivers

- ND – Derek Brown – 2 receptions, 19 yards
- UM – Dale Dawkins – 4 receptions, 123 yards, 2 TD

The Hurricanes avenged a close loss from the previous year in South Bend. This game marked the seventh time in seven attempts that Miami defeated a #1 ranked team during the 1980s.

External videos
- Full game
- Game highlights
- 3rd and 43
- Hurricane Flashback

=== Vs. Alabama (Sugar Bowl) ===
#2 Miami (FL) at #7 Alabama

| Team | 1 | 2 | 3 | 4 | Total |
|---|---|---|---|---|---|
| • Hurricanes | 7 | 13 | 6 | 7 | 33 |
| Crimson Tide | 0 | 17 | 0 | 8 | 25 |

- Date: January 1
- Location: Louisiana Superdome, New Orleans
- Game attendance: 77,452
- Game weather: Indoors
- Referee: John Nealon (Big Ten)
- TV announcers (ABC): Al Michaels, Frank Gifford, and Dan Dierdorf

== Personnel ==
=== Roster ===
1989 Miami Hurricanes football team roster
Players
Coaches
Offense

| Pos. | # | Name | Class |
|---|---|---|---|
| QB | 14 | Gino Torretta | Fr |
| WR | 37 | Doyle Aaron | So |
| TE | 93 | Randy Bethel | Jr |
| WR | 81 | Wesley Carroll | Jr |
| TE | 84 | Rob Chudzinski | Jr |
| RB | 28 | Leonard Conley | Jr |
| OL | 72 | Mario Cristobal | Fr |
| FB | 20 | Shannon Crowell | Jr |
| WR | 11 | Dale Dawkins | Sr |
| QB | 7 | Craig Erickson | Jr |
| QB | 9 | Bryan Fortay | Fr |
| C | 50 | Bobby Garcia | Sr |
| RB | 25 | Kevin Gibbs | Fr |
| G | 66 | Robert Amatucci | Fr |
| WR | 3 | Randal Hill | Jr |
| C | 64 | Rod Holder | Sr |
| RB | 21 | Alex Johnson | Jr |
| WR | 88 | Dennis Kelleher | Fr |
| RB | 30 | Stephen McGuire | Fr |
| G | 68 | Barry Panfil | So |
| TE | 55 | Kevin Patrick | Fr |
| OL | 73 | Leon Searcy | So |
| WR | 18 | Pee Wee Smith | Sr |
| WR | 35 | Darryl Spencer | So |
| G | 79 | Mike Sullivan | Jr |
| WR | 36 | Lamar Thomas | Fr |
| RB | 33 | Russell Sapp | So |

Defense

| Pos. | # | Name | Class |
|---|---|---|---|
| LB | 1 | Jessie Armstead | Fr |
| CB | 23 | Robert Bailey | Jr |
| LB | 56 | Micheal Barrow | Fr |
| CB | 6 | Kenny Berry | Sr |
| DB | 8 | Hurlie Brown | So |
| LB | 57 | Bernard Clark | Sr |
| LB | 49 | Maurice Crum | Jr |
| DL | 44 | Shane Curry | Jr |
| DB | 39 | Bobby Harden | Sr |
| DL | 63 | Jimmie Jones | Sr |
| DT | 96 | Cortez Kennedy | Sr |
| DT | 94 | Greg Mark | Sr |
| DT | 67 | Russell Maryland | Jr |
| CB | 47 | Ryan McNeil | Fr |
| LB | 38 | Richard Newbill | Sr |
| DE | 58 | Willis Peguese | Sr |
| DB | 2 | Charles Pharms | So |
| LB | 45 | Darrin Smith | Fr |
| DB | 16 | Roland Smith | Jr |
| DB | 31 | Darryl Williams | Fr |

Special teams

| Pos. | # | Name | Class |
|---|---|---|---|
| K | 1 | Edgar Benes | Sr |
| K | 27 | Carlos Huerta | So |
| P | 19 | Tim Kalal | Sr |

Head coach

- Dennis Erickson

Coordinators/assistant coaches

Legend

- (C) Team captain
- (S) Suspended
- (I) Ineligible
- Injured
- Redshirt

Roster

=== Coaching staff ===
| Name | Position | Seasons | Alma mater |
|---|---|---|---|
| Dennis Erickson | Head coach | 1st | Montana State (1969) |
| Bob Bratkowski | Offensive coordinator/wide receivers | 1st | Washington State (1978) |
| Sonny Lubick | Defensive coordinator/defensive backs | 1st | Western Montana (1960) |
| Gregg Smith | Offensive line | 1st | Idaho (1969) |
| Dave Arnold | Special teams/tight ends | 1st | |
| Bob Karmelowicz | Defensive line | 1st | Bridgeport (1972) |
| Art Kehoe | Assistant offensive line | 5th | Miami (1982) |
| Ed Orgeron | Defensive line | 1st | Northwestern State (1984) |
| Tommy Tuberville | Linebackers | 1st | Southern Arkansas (1976) |
| Alex Wood | Running backs | 1st | Iowa (1978) |

=== Support staff ===
| Name | Position | Seasons | Alma mater |
|---|---|---|---|
| Brad Roll | Strength & Conditioning | 1st | Stephen F. Austin (1980) |
| Carmen Grosso | Graduate Assistant | | |
| Ronnie Lee | Graduate Assistant | | |
| Scott Runyan | Graduate Assistant | | |
| Pete Savage | Graduate Assistant | | |
| Dan Werner | Volunteer Assistant | 3rd | Western Michigan (1983) |

== 1990 NFL draft ==
| Player | Position | Round | Pick | Team |
| Cortez Kennedy | Defensive tackle | 1 | 3 | Seattle Seahawks |
| Jimmie Jones | Defensive tackle | 3 | 64 | Dallas Cowboys |
| Bernard Clark | Linebacker | 3 | 65 | Cincinnati Bengals |
| Willis Peguese | Defensive end | 3 | 72 | Houston Oilers |
| Greg Mark | Defensive end | 3 | 79 | New York Giants |
| Richard Newbill | Linebacker | 5 | 126 | Houston Oilers |
| Dale Dawkins | Wide receiver | 9 | 223 | New York Jets |
| Kenny Berry | Defensive back | 10 | 256 | San Diego Chargers |
| Bobby Harden | Defensive back | 12 | 315 | Miami Dolphins |
