= 1989 Kent State Golden Flashes football team =

American college football season

1989 Kent State Golden Flashes football
- Conference: Mid-American Conference
- Record: 0–11 (0–8 MAC)
- Head coach: Dick Crum (2nd season)
- Home stadium: Dix Stadium

1989 Mid-American Conference football standings
| | Conf. | | | | | Overall |
| Team | W | | L | | T | W | | L | | T |
|---|---|---|---|---|---|---|---|---|---|---|
| Ball State $ | 6 | – | 1 | – | 1 | 7 | – | 3 | – | 2 |
| Eastern Michigan | 6 | – | 2 | – | 0 | 7 | – | 3 | – | 1 |
| Toledo | 6 | – | 2 | – | 0 | 6 | – | 5 | – | 0 |
| Central Michigan | 5 | – | 2 | – | 1 | 5 | – | 5 | – | 1 |
| Bowling Green | 5 | – | 3 | – | 0 | 5 | – | 6 | – | 0 |
| Western Michigan | 3 | – | 5 | – | 0 | 5 | – | 6 | – | 0 |
| Miami (OH) | 2 | – | 5 | – | 1 | 2 | – | 8 | – | 1 |
| Ohio | 1 | – | 6 | – | 1 | 1 | – | 9 | – | 1 |
| Kent State | 0 | – | 8 | – | 0 | 0 | – | 11 | – | 0 |
$ – Conference champion

The 1989 Kent State Golden Flashes football team was an American football team that represented Kent State University in the Mid-American Conference (MAC) during the 1989 NCAA Division I-A football season. In their second season under head coach Dick Crum, the Golden Flashes compiled a 0–11 record (0–8 against MAC opponents), finished in ninth place in the MAC, and were outscored by all opponents by a combined total of 377 to 179.

The team's statistical leaders included Terry Daniels with 304 rushing yards, Joe Dalpra with 1,089 passing yards, and Andre Palmer with 417 receiving yards.

== Schedule ==
| Date | Opponent | Site | Result | Attendance | Source |
|---|---|---|---|---|---|
| September 2 | at Eastern Michigan | Rynearson Stadium; Ypsilanti, MI | L 7–30 | 17,127 | |
| September 9 | at Akron* | Rubber Bowl; Akron, OH (Wagon Wheel) | L 7–40 | 35,189 | |
| September 16 | at Kansas* | Memorial Stadium; Lawrence, KS | L 21–28 | 41,000 | |
| September 23 | Western Michigan | Dix Stadium; Kent, OH | L 4–26 | | |
| September 30 | at No. 15 NC State* | Carter–Finley Stadium; Raleigh, NC | L 22–42 | 35,400 | |
| October 7 | at Central Michigan | Kelly/Shorts Stadium; Mount Pleasant, MI | L 0–38 | | |
| October 14 | Ball State | Dix Stadium; Kent, OH | L 21–23 | 12,050 | |
| October 21 | at Ohio | Peden Stadium; Athens, OH | L 14–37 | 16,205 | |
| October 28 | Toledo | Dix Stadium; Kent, OH | L 42–47 | | |
| November 4 | at Bowling Green | Doyt Perry Stadium; Bowling Green, OH (Anniversary Award) | L 28–51 | 15,220 | |
| November 11 | Miami (OH) | Dix Stadium; Kent, OH | L 13–15 | 3,500 | |
*Non-conference game; Rankings from AP Poll released prior to the game
