= 1989 Western Michigan Broncos football team =

American college football season

1989 Western Michigan Broncos football
- Conference: Mid-American Conference
- Record: 5–6 (3–5 MAC)
- Head coach: Al Molde (3rd season)
- Defensive coordinator: Larry Edlund (3rd season)
- MVP: Joel Smeenge
- Home stadium: Waldo Stadium

1989 Mid-American Conference football standings
	Conf.					Overall
Team	W		L		T	W		L		T
Ball State $	6	–	1	–	1	7	–	3	–	2
Eastern Michigan	6	–	2	–	0	7	–	3	–	1
Toledo	6	–	2	–	0	6	–	5	–	0
Central Michigan	5	–	2	–	1	5	–	5	–	1
Bowling Green	5	–	3	–	0	5	–	6	–	0
Western Michigan	3	–	5	–	0	5	–	6	–	0
Miami (OH)	2	–	5	–	1	2	–	8	–	1
Ohio	1	–	6	–	1	1	–	9	–	1
Kent State	0	–	8	–	0	0	–	11	–	0
$ – Conference champion

The 1989 Western Michigan Broncos football team represented Western Michigan University in the Mid-American Conference (MAC) during the 1989 NCAA Division I-A football season. In their third season under head coach Al Molde, the Broncos compiled a 5–6 record (3–5 against MAC opponents), finished in sixth place in the MAC, scored 210 points and allowed opponents to likewise score 210 points. The team played its home games at Waldo Stadium in Kalamazoo, Michigan.

The team's statistical leaders included Brad Tayles with 1,909 passing yards, Dan Boggan with 744 rushing yards, and Allan Boyko with 563 receiving yards. Tayles was named the MAC freshman of the year.

== Schedule ==
Date	Opponent	Site	Result	Attendance	Source
September 2	Temple*	Waldo Stadium; Kalamazoo, MI	W 31–24	16,357	
September 9	Louisiana Tech*	Waldo Stadium; Kalamazoo, MI	W 24–20	20,242	
September 16	at Maryland*	Byrd Stadium; College Park, MD	L 0–23	20,354	
September 23	at Kent State	Dix Stadium; Kent, OH	W 26–4		
September 30	Eastern Michigan	Waldo Stadium; Kalamazoo, MI	L 20–21	21,144	
October 14	Central Michigan	Waldo Stadium; Kalamazoo, MI (rivalry)	L 6–34	31,416	
October 21	at Ball State	Ball State Stadium; Muncie, IN	L 13–14	12,150	
October 28	Ohio	Waldo Stadium; Kalamazoo, MI	W 28–13	17,044	
November 4	at Toledo	Glass Bowl; Toledo, OH	L 18–19	22,653	
November 11	Bowling Green	Waldo Stadium; Kalamazoo, MI	L 30–31	6,575	
November 18	at Miami (OH)	Yager Stadium; Oxford, OH	W 14–7		
*Non-conference game
