= 1989 Colorado State Rams football team =

American college football season

1989 Colorado State Rams football
- Conference: Western Athletic Conference
- Record: 5–5–1 (4–3 WAC)
- Head coach: Earle Bruce (1st season)
- Defensive coordinator: Steve Szabo (1st season)
- Home stadium: Hughes Stadium

1989 Western Athletic Conference football standings
	Conf.					Overall
Team	W		L		T	W		L		T
No. 22 BYU $	7	–	1	–	0	10	–	3	–	0
Air Force	5	–	1	–	1	8	–	4	–	1
Hawaii	5	–	2	–	1	9	–	3	–	1
Wyoming	5	–	3	–	0	5	–	6	–	0
San Diego State	4	–	3	–	0	6	–	5	–	1
Colorado State	4	–	3	–	0	5	–	5	–	1
Utah	2	–	6	–	0	4	–	8	–	0
UTEP	1	–	7	–	0	2	–	10	–	0
New Mexico	0	–	7	–	0	2	–	10	–	0
$ – Conference champion; Rankings from AP Poll

The 1989 Colorado State Rams football team represented Colorado State University in the Western Athletic Conference during the 1989 NCAA Division I-A football season. In their first season under head coach Earle Bruce, the Rams compiled a 5–5–1 record.

== Schedule ==
Date	Opponent	Site	Result	Attendance	Source
September 2	at Tennessee*	Neyland Stadium; Knoxville, TN	L 14–17	93,652	
September 9	at No. 9 Colorado*	Folsom Field; Boulder, CO (rivalry)	L 20–45	44,921	
September 16	Cal State Fullerton*	Hughes Stadium; Fort Collins, CO	W 42–14	20,098	
September 23	Eastern Michigan*	Hughes Stadium; Fort Collins, CO	T 35–35	22,149	
September 30	No. 24 Air Force	Hughes Stadium; Fort Collins, CO (rivalry)	L 21–46	30,955	
October 7	at New Mexico	University Stadium; Albuquerque, NM	W 34–20	18,345	
October 14	No. 25 BYU	Hughes Stadium; Fort Collins, CO	L 16–45	21,198	
October 21	Hawaii	Hughes Stadium; Fort Collins, CO	W 31–16	29,774	
October 28	at Utah	Robert Rice Stadium; Salt Lake City, UT	W 50–10	21,389	
November 4	at Wyoming	War Memorial Stadium; Laramie, WY (rivalry)	L 25–56	20,412	
November 11	at UTEP	Sun Bowl; El Paso, TX	W 52–0	28,977	
*Non-conference game; Rankings from Coaches' Poll released prior to the game

== Roster ==
1989 Colorado State Rams football team roster
Players
Coaches
Offense

Pos.	#	Name	Class
WR	27	Greg Primus	Fr
QB	13	Kevin Verduge	So
WR	5	Sean Willis	Sr
FB	41	Todd Yert	Jr

Defense

Pos.	#	Name	Class
CB	2	Selwyn Jones	So
LB	89	Eric Tipeconnic	Jr

Special teams

Pos.	#	Name	Class

Head coach

- Earle Bruce

Coordinators/assistant coaches

- Steve Szabo
  (Defensive coordinator)
- Kevin Cosgrove
  (Linebackers)
- Skip Holtz
  (Wide receivers)
- Tim Salem
  (Special teams coordinator & running backs)
- Kit Cartwright
  (Assistant)

Legend

- (C) Team captain
- (S) Suspended
- (I) Ineligible
- Injured
- Redshirt
