= 1989 Central Michigan Chippewas football team =

American college football season

1989 Central Michigan Chippewas football
- Conference: Mid-American Conference
- Record: 5–5–1 (5–2–1 MAC)
- Head coach: Herb Deromedi (12th season)
- MVP: Donnie Riley
- Home stadium: Kelly/Shorts Stadium

1989 Mid-American Conference football standings
	Conf.					Overall
Team	W		L		T	W		L		T
Ball State $	6	–	1	–	1	7	–	3	–	2
Eastern Michigan	6	–	2	–	0	7	–	3	–	1
Toledo	6	–	2	–	0	6	–	5	–	0
Central Michigan	5	–	2	–	1	5	–	5	–	1
Bowling Green	5	–	3	–	0	5	–	6	–	0
Western Michigan	3	–	5	–	0	5	–	6	–	0
Miami (OH)	2	–	5	–	1	2	–	8	–	1
Ohio	1	–	6	–	1	1	–	9	–	1
Kent State	0	–	8	–	0	0	–	11	–	0
$ – Conference champion

The 1989 Central Michigan Chippewas football team represented Central Michigan University in the Mid-American Conference (MAC) during the 1989 NCAA Division I-A football season. In their 12th season under head coach Herb Deromedi, the Chippewas compiled a 5–5–1 record (5–2–1 against MAC opponents), finished in fourth place in the MAC standings, and outscored their opponents, 228 to 182. The team played its home games in Kelly/Shorts Stadium in Mount Pleasant, Michigan, with attendance of 88,152 in five home games.

The team's statistical leaders included quarterback Jeff Bender with 1,487 passing yards, tailback Donnie Riley with 1,187 rushing yards, and Ken Ealy with 346 receiving yards. Riley received the team's most valuable player award. Six Central Michigan players (Riley, center Ralph Newland, placekicker Kevin Nicholl, linebacker Mark Dennis, defensive lineman J.J. Wierenga, and defensive back David Johnson) received first-team All-MAC honors. Nicholl set a school record with 20 field goals kicked during the 1989 season.

== Schedule ==
Date	Opponent	Site	Result	Attendance	Source
September 9	at Southwestern Louisiana*	Cajun Field; Lafayette, LA	L 20–22	12,151	
September 16	Akron*	Kelly/Shorts Stadium; Mount Pleasant, MI	L 26–27	21,782	
September 23	at Bowling Green	Doyt Perry Stadium; Bowling Green, OH	L 20–24	15,103	
September 30	at Miami (OH)	Yager Stadium; Oxford, OH	W 20–7		
October 7	Kent State	Kelly/Shorts Stadium; Mount Pleasant, MI	W 38–0		
October 14	at Western Michigan	Waldo Stadium; Kalamazoo, MI (rivalry)	W 34–6	31,416	
October 21	No. T–15 Youngstown State*	Kelly/Shorts Stadium; Mount Pleasant, MI	L 3–30		
October 28	Eastern Michigan	Kelly/Shorts Stadium; Mount Pleasant, MI (rivalry)	W 24–9	20,155	
November 4	at Ball State	Ball State Stadium; Muncie, IN	T 13–13	7,985	
November 11	Ohio	Kelly/Shorts Stadium; Mount Pleasant, MI	W 24–15	9,861	
November 18	at Toledo	Glass Bowl; Toledo, OH	L 6–29	15,886	
*Non-conference game; Rankings from NCAA Division I-AA Football Committee Poll released prior to the game
