= 1989 San Jose State Spartans football team =

American college football season

1989 San Jose State Spartans football
- Conference: Big West Conference
- Record: 6–5 (5–2 Big West)
- Head coach: Claude Gilbert (6th season)
- Offensive coordinator: Rick Rasnick (3rd season)
- Home stadium: Spartan Stadium

1989 Big West Conference football standings
	Conf.					Overall
Team	W		L		T	W		L		T
Fresno State $	7	–	0	–	0	11	–	1	–	0
Cal State Fullerton	5	–	2	–	0	6	–	4	–	1
San Jose State	5	–	2	–	0	6	–	5	–	0
Utah State	4	–	3	–	0	4	–	7	–	0
UNLV	3	–	4	–	0	4	–	7	–	0
Long Beach State	2	–	5	–	0	4	–	8	–	0
Pacific (CA)	2	–	5	–	0	2	–	10	–	0
New Mexico State	0	–	7	–	0	0	–	11	–	0
$ – Conference champion

The 1989 San Jose State Spartans football team represented San Jose State University during the 1989 NCAA Division I-A football season as a member of the Big West Conference. The team was led by head coach Claude Gilbert, in his sixth (and last) year as head coach at San Jose State. They played home games at Spartan Stadium in San Jose, California. The Spartans finished the 1989 season with a record of six wins and five losses (6–5, 5–2 Big West).

== Schedule ==
Date	Opponent	Site	Result	Attendance	Source
September 16	at Arizona State*	Sun Devil Stadium; Tempe, AZ	L 21–28	63,849	
September 23	Pacific (CA)	Spartan Stadium; San Jose, CA (Victory Bell)	W 41–32	12,508	
September 30	at Stanford*	Stanford Stadium; Stanford, CA (rivalry)	W 40–33	58,000	
October 7	at California*	California Memorial Stadium; Berkeley, CA	L 21–26	31,000	
October 14	at No. 2 Miami (FL)*	Miami Orange Bowl; Miami, FL	L 16–48	45,122	
October 21	at Long Beach State	Veterans Memorial Stadium; Long Beach, CA	W 21–10	3,782	
October 28	New Mexico State^{†}	Spartan Stadium; San Jose, CA	W 34–6	9,737	
November 4	at No. 25 Fresno State	Bulldog Stadium; Fresno, CA (rivalry)	L 30–31	35,353	
November 11	at Utah State	Romney Stadium; Logan, UT	W 33–7	12,028	
November 18	Cal State Fullerton	Spartan Stadium; San Jose, CA	L 14–28	6,746	
November 25	UNLV	Spartan Stadium; San Jose, CA	W 38–28	3,479	
*Non-conference game; ^{†}Homecoming; Rankings from AP Poll released prior to the game

== Game summaries ==
=== At Miami (FL) ===
San Jose State at #3 Miami (FL)

Team	1	2	3	4	Total
Spartans	0	8	0	8	16
• Hurricanes	10	7	17	14	48

- Date: October 14
- Location: Orange Bowl (stadium), Miami, Florida

== Team players in the NFL ==
The following were selected in the 1990 NFL draft.

Player	Position	Round	Overall	NFL team
Johnny Johnson	Running back	7	169	Phoenix Cardinals
Tony Jeffery	Wide receiver	12	318	Kansas City Chiefs

The following finished their college career in 1987, were not drafted, but played in the NFL.

Player	Position	First NFL team
Ricky Siglar	Tackle – Guard	1990 San Francisco 49ers
