= Bill Wentworth (American football) =

American football player and coach

Biographical details
- Born: c. 1958
- Education: Purdue University (1980)

Coaching career (HC unless noted)
- 1978–1979: Purdue (SA)
- 1982–1983: Indiana (GA)
- 1984–1985: LSU (assistant)
- 1986–1987: Idaho (assistant)
- 1988: Cal State Fullerton (DB)
- 1989–1990: Cal State Fullerton (OC/QB)
- 1991–1992: Washington (WR)
- 1993–1999: Denison

Head coaching record
- Overall: 23–46–1

Bill Wentworth (born c. 1958) is a retired American football player and coach. He served as the head football coach at Denison University in Granville, Ohio from 1993 to 1999, compiling a record of 23–46–1. He was an assistant coach at the University of Washington and a member of the 1991 national championship team.

== Head coaching record ==
Year	Team	Overall	Conference	Standing	Bowl/playoffs
Denison Big Red (North Coast Athletic Conference) (1993–1999)
1993	Denison	3–7	3–5	T–5th	
1994	Denison	3–7	3–5	6th	
1995	Denison	2–7–1	2–5–1	6th	
1996	Denison	4–6	3–4	T–4th	
1997	Denison	4–6	3–4	T–4th	
1998	Denison	3–7	2–6	T–7th	
1999	Denison	4–6	2–4	5th	
Denison:		23–46–1	18–33–1		
Total:		23–46–1			
