= Eric Bergeson =

American football player (born 1966)

No. 36
- Position: Defensive back

Personal information
- Born: January 1, 1966 (age 60); Salt Lake City, Utah, U.S.
- Listed height: 6 ft 0 in (1.83 m)
- Listed weight: 192 lb (87 kg)

Career information
- High school: Provo (UT) Timpview
- College: BYU
- NFL draft: 1990: undrafted

Career history
- Atlanta Falcons (1990); Houston Oilers (1991)*; New England Patriots (1992)*
- * Offseason or practice squad member only

Awards and highlights
- First-team All-WAC (1989)

Career NFL statistics
- Games played: 13
- Stats at Pro Football Reference

Eric Scott Bergeson (born January 1, 1966) is an American former professional football player who was a defensive back for the Atlanta Falcons of the National Football League (NFL) in 1990. He played college football for the BYU Cougars.
