= Richard Newbill =

American football player (born 1968)

No. 53, 58, 52, 94
- Position: Linebacker

Personal information
- Born: February 8, 1968 (age 58); Camden, New Jersey, U.S.
- Listed height: 6 ft 1 in (1.85 m)
- Listed weight: 240 lb (109 kg)

Career information
- High school: Clearview Regional (Mullica Hill, New Jersey)
- College: Bakersfield (1986–1987); Miami (FL) (1988–1989)
- NFL draft: 1990: 5th round, 126th overall pick

Career history
- Houston Oilers (1990)*; Minnesota Vikings (1990); Seattle Seahawks (1990–1992); London Monarchs (1995); St. Louis Rams (1995)*; London/English Monarchs (1996–1998)
- * Offseason or practice squad member only

Awards and highlights
- National champion (1989); All-WLAF (1997)
- Stats at Pro Football Reference

Richard Arthur Newbill (born February 8, 1968) is an American professional former football linebacker who played three seasons in the National Football League (NFL) with the Minnesota Vikings and Seattle Seahawks. He was selected by the Houston Oilers in the fifth round of the 1990 NFL draft. He played college football at Bakersfield College and the University of Miami.

== Early life and college ==
Richard Arthur Newbill was born on February 8, 1968, in Camden, New Jersey. He attended Clearview Regional High School in Mullica Hill, New Jersey.

Newbill played college football at Bakersfield College from 1986 to 1987. He was then a two-year letterman for the Miami Hurricanes of the University of Miami from 1988 to 1989.

== Professional career ==
Newbill was selected by the Houston Oilers in the fifth round, with the 126th overall pick, of the 1990 NFL draft. He officially signed with the team on July 22. However, he was later released on September 3, 1990.

Newbill was signed to the practice squad of the Minnesota Vikings on November 13, 1990. He was promoted to the active roster on November 24 and played in two games for the Vikings during the 1990 season. He was released on December 4 and signed to the practice squad the next day.

On December 23, 1990, Newbill was signed to the Seattle Seahawks' active roster off of the Vikings practice squad. He appeared in one game for the Seahawks in 1990. He was released by Seattle on August 20, 1991, re-signed on October 8, released on November 30, re-signed on December 5, and also placed on injured reserve on December 5. Newbill played in one game for the Seahawks during the 1991 season. He became a free agent after the season and re-signed with the Seahawks. He was released on August 31, 1992. He was re-signed by Seattle on October 29, 1992, after Terry Wooden suffered an injury. Newbill played in seven games during the 1992 season.

In February 1995, Newbill was selected by the London Monarchs of the World League of American Football (WLAF) in the 1995 WLAF draft. He recorded three sacks and one interception for the Monarchs during the 1995 WLAF season. He was signed by the St. Louis Rams of the National Football League on July 17, 1995. On August 29, 1995, it was reported that Newbill had been released by the Rams. He totaled 72 tackles, one sack, and three pass breakups for the Monarchs in 1996. He posted 71 tackles, six sacks, one forced fumble, and six pass breakups during the 1997 season and earned All-WLAF honors. Newbill recorded 40 defensive tackles and two special teams tackles for the newly-renamed England Monarchs in 1998.
