= 1990–91 NCAA football bowl games =

College football postseason game series

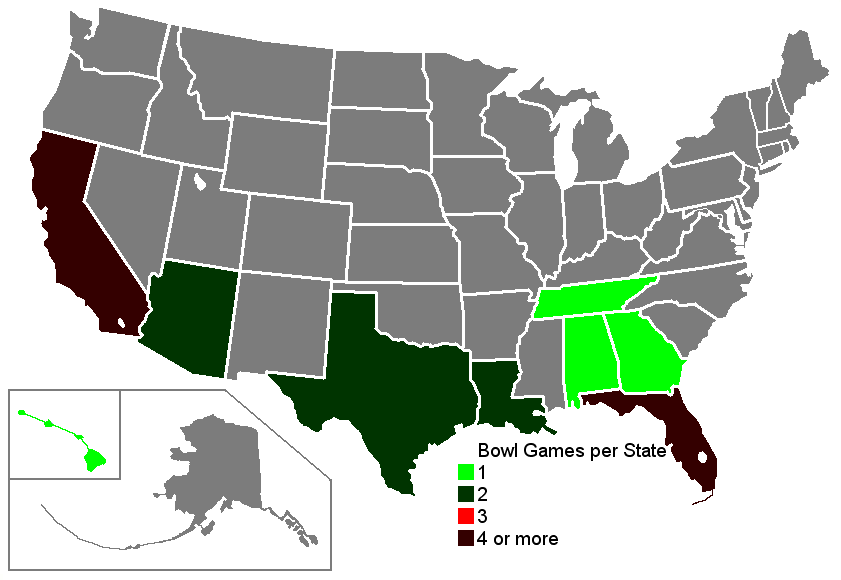
- Number of bowl games per state.
- Season: 1990
- Regular season: September 1–December 1
- Number of bowls: 19
- Bowl games: December 8, 1990 – January 1, 1991
- National Championship: none
- Location of Championship: N/A
- Champions: Colorado Buffaloes and Georgia Tech Yellow Jackets
Bowl record by conference
Conference	Bowls	Record	Number of teams in final AP poll
Independents	8	4–3–1 (0.563)	5
Big Ten	6	2–4 (0.333)	4
ACC	5	3–1–1 (0.700)	3
Pac-10	5	2–3 (0.400)	2
SEC	4	2–2 (0.500)	4
WAC	4	2–2 (0.500)	1
Big Eight	2	1–1 (0.500)	3
SWC	2	1–1 (0.500)	3
Big West	1	1–0 (1.000)	0
MAC	1	0–1 (0.000)	0

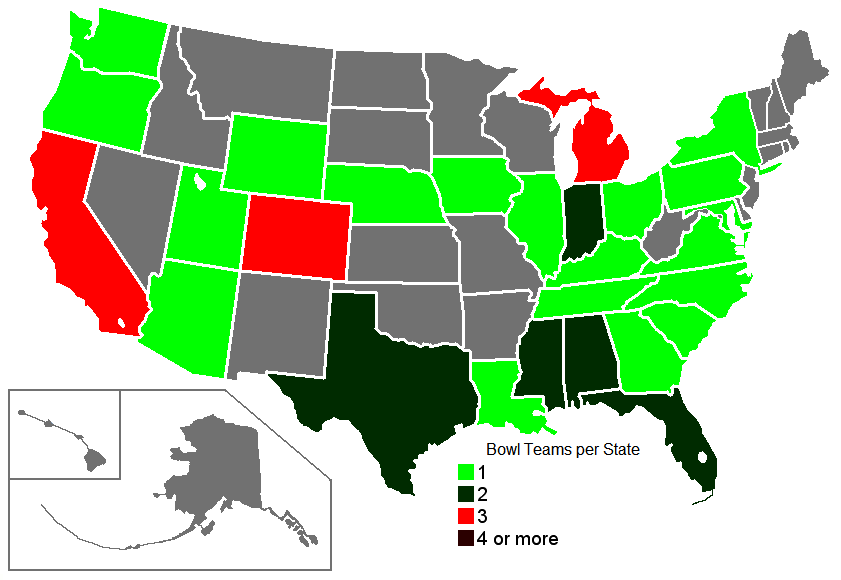
Number of bowl teams per state.

The 1990–91 NCAA football bowl games featured 19 games, starting early in December 1990 and ending on New Year's Day 1991. They followed the 1990 regular season and ended in controversy. Going into the postseason, Colorado had a 10–1–1 record and was ranked #1 in both Coaches' and AP polls. After a relatively unimpressive and controversial 10–9 victory over #5 Notre Dame in the Orange Bowl and an impressive victory by the undefeated (10–0–1) #2 Georgia Tech in the Citrus Bowl, the Buffaloes lost their #1 ranking to the Yellow Jackets in the Coaches' Poll, creating a split championship. This controversial ending, along with the dual undefeated champions of the following year, led to the creation of the Bowl Coalition.

== Bowl games ==
NOTE: Rankings used are the final regular season AP Rankings whenever noted

Date	Game	Site	Result
Dec 8	California Bowl	Bulldog Stadium; Fresno, CA	Central Michigan 24, San Jose State 48
Dec 15	Independence Bowl	Independence Stadium; Shreveport, LA	Maryland 34, Louisiana Tech 34
Dec 25	Aloha Bowl	Aloha Stadium; Honolulu, HI	Syracuse 28, Arizona 0
Dec 27	Liberty Bowl	Liberty Bowl Memorial Stadium; Memphis, TN	Air Force 23, (24) Ohio State 11
Dec 28	Blockbuster Bowl	Joe Robbie Stadium; Miami Gardens, FL	(7) Penn State 17, (6) Florida State 24
Dec 28	All-American Bowl	Legion Field; Birmingham, AL	(23) Southern Miss 27, NC State 31
Dec 29	Peach Bowl	Atlanta-Fulton County Stadium; Atlanta, GA	Indiana 23, Auburn 27
Dec 29	Freedom Bowl	Anaheim Stadium; Anaheim, CA	Colorado State 32, Oregon 31
Dec 29	Holiday Bowl	Jack Murphy Stadium; San Diego, CA	(13) BYU 14, Texas A&M 65
Dec 31	Copper Bowl	Arizona Stadium; Tucson, AZ	California 17, Wyoming 15
Dec 31	John Hancock Bowl	Sun Bowl; El Paso, TX	(22) Michigan State 17, No. 21 USC 16
Jan 1	Hall of Fame Bowl	Tampa Stadium; Tampa, FL	(14) Clemson 30, (16) Illinois 0
Jan 1	Florida Citrus Bowl	Florida Citrus Bowl; Orlando, FL	(2) Georgia Tech 45, (19) Nebraska 21
Jan 1	Fiesta Bowl	Sun Devil Stadium; Tempe, AZ	(18) Louisville 34, (25) Alabama 7
Jan 1	Gator Bowl	Gator Bowl Stadium; Jacksonville, FL	(12) Michigan 35, (15) Ole Miss 3
Jan 1	Cotton Bowl Classic	Cotton Bowl; Dallas, TX	(4) Miami 46, (3) Texas 3
Jan 1	Rose Bowl	Rose Bowl; Pasadena, CA	(17) Iowa 34, (8) Washington 46
Jan 1	Sugar Bowl	Louisiana Superdome; New Orleans, LA	Virginia 22, (10) Tennessee 23
Jan 1	Orange Bowl	Orange Bowl; Miami, FL	(5) Notre Dame 9, (1) Colorado 10

== Final rankings ==
=== AP Poll ===
1. Colorado
2. Georgia Tech
3. Miami (FL)
4. Florida State
5. Washington
6. Notre Dame
7. Michigan
8. Tennessee
9. Clemson
10. Houston
11. Penn State
12. Texas
13. Florida
14. Louisville
15. Texas A&M
16. Michigan State
17. Oklahoma
18. Iowa
19. Auburn
20. USC
21. Ole Miss
22. BYU
23. Virginia
24. Nebraska
25. Illinois

=== Coaches' Poll ===
1. Georgia Tech
2. Colorado
3. Miami (FL)
4. Florida State
5. Washington
6. Notre Dame
7. Tennessee
8. Michigan
9. Clemson
10. Penn State
11. Texas
12. Louisville
13. Texas A&M
14. Michigan State
15. Virginia
16. Iowa
17. BYU (tie)
17. Nebraska (tie)
19. Auburn
20. San Jose State
21. Syracuse
22. USC
23. Ole Miss
24. Illinois
25. Virginia Tech

- Florida, Houston, and Oklahoma were on probation by the NCAA during the 1990 season; they were therefore ineligible to receive votes in the Coaches' Poll
