= 1990 Peach Bowl =

American college football game

- 23rd Peach Bowl
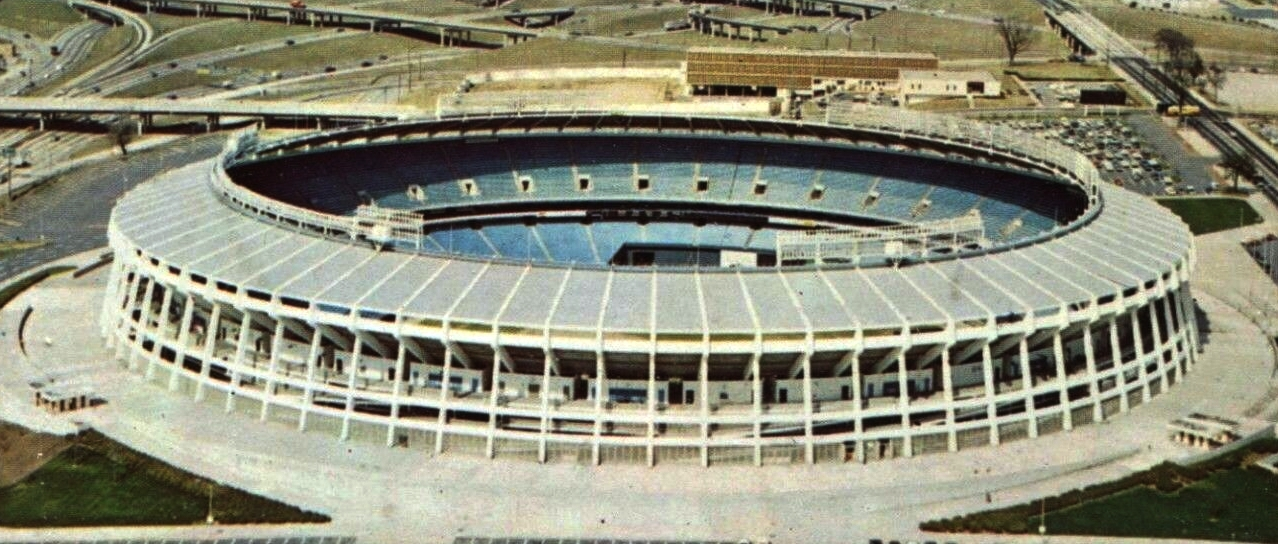
- The Atlanta–Fulton County Stadium in Atlanta, Georgia, hosted the Peach Bowl.
Indiana Hoosiers	Auburn Tigers
(6–4–1)	(7–3–1)
Big Ten	SEC
23	27
Head coach: Bill Mallory	Head coach: Pat Dye
	1	2	3	4	Total
Indiana	7	3	0	13	23
Auburn	7	10	0	10	27
- Date: December 29, 1990
- Season: 1990
- Stadium: Atlanta–Fulton County Stadium
- Location: Atlanta, Georgia
- MVP: Stan White (Auburn); Vaughn Dunbar (Indiana); Darrel Crawford (Auburn)
- Referee: Jack Baker (WAC)
- Attendance: 38,962

United States TV coverage
- Network: ABC
- Announcers: Steve Zabriskie and Lynn Swann

The 1990 Peach Bowl, part of the 1990 bowl game season, took place on December 29, 1990, at Atlanta–Fulton County Stadium in Atlanta, Georgia. The competing teams were the Indiana Hoosiers of the Big Ten Conference (Big Ten), and the Auburn Tigers, representing the Southeastern Conference (SEC). In what was the first ever meeting between the schools, Auburn was victorious in by a final score of 27–23.

== Teams ==
=== Indiana ===
The 1990 Indiana squad opened the season with four consecutive wins before they tied Ohio State in their fifth game. The Hoosiers then went on a three-game losing streak against Minnesota, Michigan and Michigan State. They then completed the regular season with a pair of wins and a loss against Illinois en route to an overall record of six wins, four losses and one tie (6–4–1). After their victory over Purdue in the season finale, the Hoosiers accepted a bid to play in the Peach Bowl. Their appearance marked the second for Indiana in the Peach Bowl, and their sixth overall bowl game.

=== Auburn ===
The 1990 Auburn squad finished the regular season with a tie against Tennessee and losses to Florida, Southern Miss and Alabama en route to an overall record of seven wins, three losses and one tie (7–3–1). After their loss against Alabama in the Iron Bowl on December 1, Auburn officially accepted an invitation to play in the Peach Bowl. The appearance marked the first for Auburn in the Peach Bowl, and their 23rd overall bowl game.

== Game summary ==
Auburn took an early 7–0 lead on a six-yard Stan White touchdown run, and the Hoosiers responded with a three-yard Trent Green touchdown run that tied the game 7–7 at the end of the first quarter. In the second quarter, the Tigers took a 14–7 lead after an 11-yard White touchdown pass to Alex Smith. Each team then scored a field goal before the end of the quarter that made the halftime score 17–10 in favor of Auburn. After a scoreless third quarter, Jim Von Wyl connected on a 42-yard field goal early in the fourth that extended the Tigers' lead to 20–10. The Hoosiers then took a 23–20 lead late in the quarter after Green scored on touchdown runs of two and eleven-yards. White then scored the game-winning touchdown with his one-yard run with only 0:39 left in the contest. For their individual performances, Stan White, Vaughn Dunbar and Darrel Crawford were recognized as game MVPs.

Scoring summary

Quarter	Time	Drive			Team	Scoring information	Score	
Quarter	Time	Plays	Yards	TOP	Team	Scoring information	Indiana	Auburn
1					Auburn	Stan White 6-yard touchdown run, Jim Von Wyl kick good	0	7
1					Indiana	Trent Green 3-yard touchdown run, Scott Bonnell kick good	7	7
2					Auburn	Alex Smith 11-yard touchdown reception from Stan White, Jim Von Wyl kick good	7	14
2					Indiana	42-yard field goal by Scott Bonnell	10	14
2					Auburn	26-yard field goal by Jim Von Wyl	10	17
4					Auburn	43-yard field goal by Jim Von Wyl	10	20
4					Indiana	Trent Green 2-yard touchdown run, 2-point pass failed	16	20
4					Indiana	Trent Green 11-yard touchdown run, Scott Bonnell kick good	23	20
4					Auburn	Stan White 1-yard touchdown run, Jim Von Wyl kick good	23	27
"TOP" = time of possession. For other American football terms, see Glossary of American football.							23	27
