= 1990 Big Ten Conference football season =

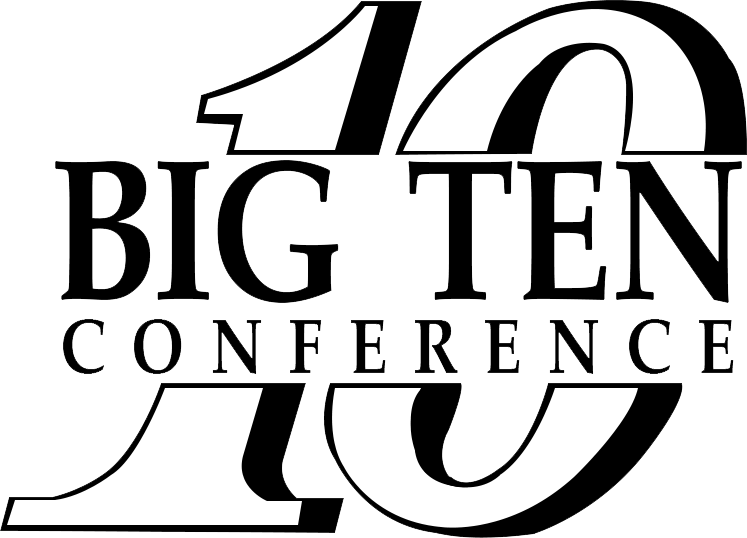
- League: NCAA Division I-A
- Sport: Football
- Teams: 10
- TV partner(s): ESPN/ABC, Raycom
- Top draft pick: Bobby Wilson
- Picked by: Washington Redskins
- Co-champions: Iowa, Michigan, Michigan State, Illinois
- Season MVP: Nick Bell
- Top scorer: J.D. Carlson

Football seasons

1990 Big Ten Conference football standings
	Conf.					Overall
Team	W		L		T	W		L		T
No. 7 Michigan +	6	–	2	–	0	9	–	3	–	0
No. 16 Michigan State +	6	–	2	–	0	8	–	3	–	1
No. 25 Illinois +	6	–	2	–	0	8	–	4	–	0
No. 18 Iowa +	6	–	2	–	0	8	–	4	–	0
Ohio State	5	–	2	–	1	7	–	4	–	1
Minnesota	5	–	3	–	0	6	–	5	–	0
Indiana	3	–	4	–	1	6	–	5	–	1
Northwestern	1	–	7	–	0	2	–	9	–	0
Purdue	1	–	7	–	0	2	–	9	–	0
Wisconsin	0	–	8	–	0	1	–	10	–	0
+ – Conference co-champions; Rankings from AP Poll

The 1990 Big Ten Conference football season was the 95th season of college football played by the member schools of the Big Ten Conference and was a part of the 1990 NCAA Division I-A football season.

The Iowa Hawkeyes won a four-way tie for the Big Ten Conference championship by defeating the three other teams atop the conference standings – Michigan, Michigan State, and Illinois – in their respective head-to-head matchups. The Hawkeyes earned their third trip to Pasadena in ten seasons, but lost 46-34 to Washington in the 1991 Rose Bowl.

Michigan defeated Ole Miss 35-3 in the Gator Bowl to finish 9-3 on the season. The #7 Wolverines were the highest ranked Big Ten team in the final AP poll. Joining Michigan in the final rankings were the other conference co-champions – #16 Michigan State, #18 Iowa, and #25 Illinois.

Iowa running back Nick Bell received the Chicago Tribune Silver Football trophy as the conference's most valuable player. Michigan defensive back Tripp Welborne and Illinois defensive lineman Moe Gardner were consensus first-team All-Americans for the second straight season.

Prior to the start of the season and upon Big Ten commissioner Jim Delany's recommendation, the conference's university presidents met on June 4 and unanimously voted to add Penn State into the league. The Nittany Lions' teams would gradually join the Big Ten over the next few years, with football participating in 1993.

== Season overview ==
=== Results and team statistics ===
Conf. Rank	Team	Head coach	AP final	AP high	Overall record	Conf. record	PPG	PAG	MVP
1	Michigan	Gary Moeller	#7	#1	9-3	6–2	32.4	**16.5**	Tripp Welborne
	Michigan State	George Perles	#16	#16	8–3-1	6–2	26.0	18.6	Tico Duckett
	Illinois	John Mackovic	#25	#5	8–4	6–2	25.3	27.8	
	Iowa	Hayden Fry	#18	#6	8–4	6–2	**35.6**	24.0	**Nick Bell**
5	Ohio State	John Cooper	NR	#15	9–3	5–3	27.1	17.7	
6	Minnesota	John Gutekunst	NR	NR	6–5	5–3	20.4	25.5	
7	Indiana	Bill Mallory	NR	NR	6–5-1	3–4-1	27.4	19.8	
8	Northwestern	Francis Peay	NR	NR	2–9	1–7	19.1	33.6	
	Purdue	Fred Akers	NR	NR	2–9	1–7	16.1	30.6	
10	Wisconsin	Barry Alvarez	NR	NR	1–10	0–8	12.1	25.9	

Key
AP final = Team's rank in the final AP Poll of the 1990 season
AP high = Team's highest rank in the AP Poll throughout the 1990 season
PPG = Average of points scored per game; conference leader's average displayed in bold
PAG = Average of points allowed per game; conference leader's average displayed in bold
MVP = Most valuable player as voted by players on each team as part of the voting process to determine the winner of the Chicago Tribune Silver Football trophy; trophy winner in bold

=== Bowl games ===
Six Big Ten teams played in bowl games:

- **Iowa** lost to Washington, 46-34, in the Rose Bowl in Pasadena, California.
- **Michigan** defeated Ole Miss, 35-3, in the Gator Bowl in Jacksonville, Florida.
- **Illinois** lost to Clemson, 30-0, in the Hall of Fame Bowl in Tampa, Florida.
- **Michigan State** defeated USC, 17-16, in the John Hancock Bowl in El Paso, Texas.
- **Indiana** lost to Auburn, 27-23, in the Peach Bowl, in Atlanta, Georgia.
- **Ohio State** lost to Air Force, 23-11, in the Liberty Bowl in Memphis, Tennessee.

== Statistical leaders ==
The Big Ten's individual statistical leaders include the following:

=== Passing yards ===
1. Jason Verduzco, Illinois (2,567)
2. Eric Hunter, Purdue (2,355)
3. Matt Rodgers, Iowa (2,228)
4. Greg Frey, Ohio State (2,062)
5. Elvis Grbac, Michigan (1,911)

=== Rushing yards ===
1. Tico Duckett, Michigan State (1,394)
2. Jon Vaughn, Michigan (1,364)
3. Vaughn Dunbar, Indiana (1,224)
4. Hyland Hickson, Michigan State (1,196)
5. Robert Smith, Ohio State (1,126)

=== Receiving yards ===
1. Desmond Howard, Michigan (1,025)
2. Shawn Wax, Illinois (863)
3. Richard Buchanan, Northwestern (834)
4. Jeff Graham, Ohio State (763)
5. Rob Turner, Indiana (717)

=== Total offense ===
1. Jason Verduzco, Illinois (2,384)
2. Eric Hunter, Purdue (2,355)
3. Matt Rodgers, Iowa (2,292)
4. Greg Frey, Ohio State (1,965)
5. Elvis Grbac, Michigan (1,928)

=== Passing efficiency rating ===
1. Elvis Grbac, Michigan (137.2)
2. Jason Verduzco, Illinois (132.5)
3. Matt Rodgers, Iowa (130.2)
4. Dan Enos, Michigan State (122.3)
5. Greg Frey, Ohio State (120.7)

=== Rushing yards per attempt ===
1. Robert Smith, Ohio State (6.4)
2. Jon Vaughn, Michigan (6.3)
3. Nick Bell, Iowa (6.1)
4. Howard Griffith, Illinois (5.5)
5. Tico Duckett, Michigan State (5.4)

=== Yards per reception ===
1. Rob Turner, Indiana (21.7)
2. Tim Ware, Wisconsin (19.7)
3. Jeff Graham, Ohio State (19.1)
4. Desmond Howard, Michigan (16.3)
5. James Bradley, Michigan State (16.2)

=== Points scored ===
1. J.D. Carlson, Michigan (95)
2. Howard Griffith, Illinois (90)
2. Hyland Hickson, Michigan State (90)
4. Nick Bell, Iowa (84)
5. Jeff Skillett, Iowa (83)

== Awards and honors ==
=== All-conference players ===
The following players were picked by the Associated Press (AP) and/or the United Press International (UPI) as first-team players on the 1990 All-Big Ten Conference football team.

Offense

Position	Name	Team	Selectors
Quarterback	Matt Rodgers	Iowa	AP
Running back	Nick Bell	Iowa	AP
Running back	Jon Vaughn	Michigan	AP
Center	Dan Beatty	Ohio State	AP
Center	Chris Thome	Minnesota	AP
Guard	Dean Dingman	Michigan	AP
Guard	Eric Moten	Michigan State	AP
Tackle	Tom Dohring	Michigan	AP
Tackle	Greg Skrepenak	Michigan	AP
Tight end	Duane Young	Michigan State	AP
Receiver	Richard Buchanan	Northwestern	AP
Receiver	Jeff Graham	Ohio State	AP

Defense

Position	Name	Team	Selectors
Defensive line	Mel Agee	Northwestern	AP
Defensive line	Don Davey	Wisconsin	AP
Defensive line	Moe Gardner	Illinois	AP
Defensive line	Carlos Jenkins	Michigan State	AP
Defensive line	Jim Johnson	Iowa	AP
Linebacker	Darrick Brownlow	Illinois	AP
Linebacker	Melvin Foster	Iowa	AP
Linebacker	Steve Tovar	Ohio State	AP
Defensive back	Mike Dumas	Indiana	AP
Defensive back	Merton Hanks	Iowa	AP
Defensive back	Tripp Welborne	Michigan	AP

Special teams

Position	Name	Team	Selectors
Placekicker	John Langeloh	Michigan State	AP
Punter	Macky Smith	Indiana	AP

=== All-Americans ===
At the end of the season, two Big Ten players were consensus first-team picks for the 1990 College Football All-America Team. The Big Ten's consensus All-Americans were:

Position	Name	Team	Selectors
Defensive back	Tripp Welborne	Michigan	AFCA, AP, FWAA, UPI, WCFF, FN, NEA, SH, TSN
Nose guard	Moe Gardner	Illinois	AFCA, UPI, WCFF, GNS, SH

=== Other awards ===
Hayden Fry of Iowa received his second Big Ten Coach of the Year award.

== 1991 NFL draft ==
The 1991 NFL draft was held April 21–22, 1991. The following Big Ten players were selected in the first round of the draft:

Name	Position	Team	Round	Overall pick
Bobby Wilson	Defensive Tackle	Michigan State	1	17
Vinnie Clark	Cornerback	Ohio State	1	19
Henry Jones	Safety	Illinois	1	26
Jarrod Bunch	Fullback	Michigan	1	27
