= 1990 Iowa Hawkeyes football team =

American college football season

1990 Iowa Hawkeyes football

Big Ten co-champion

Rose Bowl, L 34–46 vs. Washington
- Conference: Big Ten Conference

Ranking
- Coaches: No. 16
- AP: No. 18
- Record: 8–4 (6–2 Big Ten)
- Head coach: Hayden Fry (12th season)
- Offensive coordinator: Carl Jackson (2nd season)
- Offensive scheme: Pro-style
- Defensive coordinator: Bill Brashier (12th season)
- Base defense: 5–2
- MVP: 10: Greg Aegerter; Nick Bell; Melvin Foster; Merton Hanks; Jim Johnson; Mike Miller; Matt Ruhland; Sean Smith; Tony Stewart; Michael Titley
- Captains: Greg Aegerter; Merton Hanks; Jim Johnson; Tony Stewart
- Home stadium: Kinnick Stadium

1990 Big Ten Conference football standings
	Conf.					Overall
Team	W		L		T	W		L		T
No. 7 Michigan +	6	–	2	–	0	9	–	3	–	0
No. 16 Michigan State +	6	–	2	–	0	8	–	3	–	1
No. 25 Illinois +	6	–	2	–	0	8	–	4	–	0
No. 18 Iowa +	6	–	2	–	0	8	–	4	–	0
Ohio State	5	–	2	–	1	7	–	4	–	1
Minnesota	5	–	3	–	0	6	–	5	–	0
Indiana	3	–	4	–	1	6	–	5	–	1
Northwestern	1	–	7	–	0	2	–	9	–	0
Purdue	1	–	7	–	0	2	–	9	–	0
Wisconsin	0	–	8	–	0	1	–	10	–	0
+ – Conference co-champions; Rankings from AP Poll

The 1990 Iowa Hawkeyes football team represented the University of Iowa in the 1990 NCAA Division I-A football season. The Hawkeyes played their home games at Kinnick Stadium and were led by legendary coach Hayden Fry.

After starting 7–1 and rising to No. 6 in the polls, Iowa finished the season with an 8–4 record (6–2 Big Ten), winning a four-way tie for the Big Ten Conference championship by defeating the three other teams atop the conference standings – Michigan, Michigan State, and Illinois – in their respective head-to-head matchups. The Hawkeyes earned their third trip to Pasadena in ten years, but fell behind early in the 1991 Rose Bowl and lost 46–34 to the Washington Huskies. It was another 25 years before Iowa made a return trip to the Rose Bowl.

== Schedule ==
Date	Time	Opponent	Rank	Site	TV	Result	Attendance	Source
September 15	1:00 pm	Cincinnati*		Kinnick Stadium; Iowa City, IA	IPTV	W 63–10	66,700	
September 22	11:00 am	Iowa State*		Kinnick Stadium; Iowa City, IA (rivalry)		W 45–35	70,389	
September 29	7:00 pm	at No. 10 Miami (FL)*		Miami Orange Bowl; Miami, FL	PPV	L 21–48	70,420	
October 6	12:00 pm	at No. 18 Michigan State		Spartan Stadium; East Lansing, MI		W 12–7	76,873	
October 13	1:00 pm	Wisconsin	No. 25	Kinnick Stadium; Iowa City, IA (rivalry)	IPTV	W 30–10	69,890	
October 20	11:30 am	at No. 10 Michigan	No. 23	Michigan Stadium; Ann Arbor, MI	ESPN	W 24–23	105,517	
October 27	1:00 pm	Northwestern^{†}	No. 15	Kinnick Stadium; Iowa City, IA		W 56–14	69,501	
November 3	2:30 pm	at No. 5 Illinois	No. 13	Memorial Stadium; Champaign, IL	ABC	W 54–28	72,714	
November 10	11:00 am	Ohio State	No. 6	Kinnick Stadium; Iowa City, IA	ABC	L 26–27	70,033	
November 17	2:30 pm	Purdue	No. 13	Kinnick Stadium; Iowa City, IA	ABC	W 38–9	67,636	
November 24	1:30 pm	at Minnesota	No. 13	Hubert H. Humphrey Metrodome; Minneapolis, MN (rivalry)		L 24–31	64,694	
January 1	3:30 pm	vs. No. 8 Washington*	No. 17	Rose Bowl; Pasadena, CA (Rose Bowl)	ABC	L 34–46	101,273	
*Non-conference game; ^{†}Homecoming; Rankings from AP Poll released prior to the game; All times are in Central time; Source:

== Rankings ==
Ranking movements Legend: ██ Increase in ranking ██ Decrease in ranking — = Not ranked RV = Received votes
	Week															
Poll	Pre	1	2	3	4	5	6	7	8	9	10	11	12	13	14	Final
AP	—	RV	—	RV	RV	—	25	22	15	13	6	13	13	18	17	18
Coaches	—	—	—	RV	25	RV	24	19	13	13	5	12	11	15	15	16

== Game summaries ==
=== Cincinnati ===
Cincinnati at Iowa

Team	1	2	3	4	Total
Bearcats	7	3	0	0	10
• Hawkeyes	0	28	21	14	63

- Date: September 15
- Location: Kinnick Stadium
  Iowa City, IA
- Game attendance: 66,700
- Television network: IPTV
- Sources: Box Score and Game Story

Scoring summary
1	1:45	CIN	Abrams 1-yard run (Rowe kick)	CIN 7–0
2		IOWA	Matt Rodgers 1-yard run (Skillett kick)	Tied 7–7
2		IOWA	Matt Rodgers 1-yard run (Skillett kick)	Tied 14–7
2	12:21	IOWA	Nick Bell 12-yard run (Skillett kick)	IOWA 21–7
2		IOWA	Tony Stewart 69-yard run (Skillett kick)	IOWA 28–7
2	0:29	CIN	Rowe 27-yard field goal	IOWA 28–10
3		IOWA	Lew Montgomery 1-yard run (Skillett kick)	IOWA 35–10
3		IOWA	Matt Rodgers 11-yard run (Skillett kick)	IOWA 42–10
3		IOWA	Jim Hartlieb 2-yard run (Skillett kick)	IOWA 49–10
4		IOWA	Kujawa 13-yard run (Skillett kick)	IOWA 56–10
4		IOWA	Jim Hartlieb 11-yard run (Skillett kick)	IOWA 63–10

Kicking off the start of the 1990 Iowa Hawkeye season, the Hawks welcomed in the Cincinnati Bearcats. The Bearcats finished out the '89 season at 1–9–1 as the Hawks finished out at 5–6. In a game that ended up in a blowout, the Hawks cruised to a 63–10 win. Iowa managed to set records as well as they pummeled the Cincinnati defense. After Cincinnati built a 7–0 lead after an interception and a 1-yard touchdown run from Joe Abrams, the Hawks took command for the afternoon. After a scoreless first quarter, quarterback Matt Rodgers led the Hawks to 28 unanswered points, following two touchdowns from Rodgers, and one each from running backs Nick Bell and Tony Stewart. Cincinnati scored its last points of the game with a late field goal and ended the half with Iowa up 28–10. After halftime, Iowa went on cruise control. Iowa went on to score 21 points in the 3rd and 14 in the 4th to win the contest 63–10. Rodgers ended the game going 15–27 on passes with 191 yards. Hawkeye offense racked up 662 yards with 455 yards rushing. The defense was excellent as well. The Bearcats were allowed only 4 first downs and 69 yards rushing.

=== Iowa State ===
Iowa State at Iowa
Battle for the Cy-Hawk Trophy

Team	1	2	3	4	Total
Cyclones	7	7	7	14	35
• Hawkeyes	7	10	21	7	45

- Date: September 22
- Location: Kinnick Stadium
  Iowa City, IA
- Game start: 11:00 AM CDT
- Game attendance: 70,389
- Television network: ABC
- Sources: Box Score and Game Story

Scoring summary
1	IOWA	Titley 7-yard pass from Matt Rodgers (Skillett kick)	IOWA 7–0
1	ISU	Utter 1-yard run (Shudak kick)	Tied 7–7
2	IOWA	Nick Bell 28-yard run (Skillett kick)	IOWA 14–7
2	ISU	Glotfelty 7-yard pass from Utter (Shudak kick)	Tied 14–14
2	IOWA	Skillett 25-yard field goal	IOWA 17–14
3	IOWA	Matt Rodgers 5-yard run (Skillett kick)	IOWA 24–14
3	IOWA	Stewart 18-yard run (Skillett kick)	IOWA 31–14
3	IOWA	Montgomery 1-yard run (Skillett kick)	IOWA 38–14
3	ISU	Glotfelty 39-yard pass from Utter (Shudak kick)	IOWA 38–21
4	ISU	Williams 1-yard run (Shudak kick)	IOWA 38–28
4	IOWA	Montgomery 15-yard run (Skillett kick)	IOWA 45–28
4	ISU	Pederson 66-yard fumble return (Shudak kick)	IOWA 45-35

The Hawkeyes won a high-scoring affair with in-state rival Iowa State, their eighth in a series of fifteen straight wins in the rivalry.

=== At Miami (FL) ===
Iowa at #10 Miami

Team	1	2	3	4	Total
Hawkeyes	0	14	7	0	21
• Hurricanes	14	10	7	17	48

- Date: September 29
- Location: Orange Bowl
  Miami, FL
- Game attendance: 70,420
- Sources: Box Score and Game Story

Scoring summary
1	4:14	UM	McGuire 1-yard run (Huerta kick)	Miami 7–0
1		UM	Wesley Carroll 73-yard pass from Craig Erickson (Huerta kick)	Miami 14–0
2	13:42	IOWA	Nick Bell 3-yard run (Skillett kick)	Miami 14–7
2		UM	Darryl Spencer 40-yard pass from Craig Erickson (Huerta kick)	Miami 21–7
2		IOWA	Nick Bell 53-yard pass from Matt Rodgers (Skillett kick)	Miami 21–14
2		UM	Huerta field goal	Miami 24–14
3	8:29	IOWA	Sean Smith 35-yard pass from Matt Rodgers (Skillett kick)	Miami 24–21
3		UM	McGuire 6-yard run (Huerta kick)	Miami 31–21
4	14:04	UM	Wesley Carroll 16-yard pass from Craig Erickson (Huerta kick)	Miami 38–21
4		UM	Huerta 36-yard field goal	Miami 41–21
4		UM	Ryan McNeil 75-yard fumble return (Huerta kick)	Miami 48–21

After pulling to within 24–21 midway through the third quarter, Iowa fell to the mighty Miami Hurricanes in the Orange Bowl, 48–21. It was Miami's 33rd consecutive home win. Even in showing some competitiveness at the game in Miami, FL, few Hawk fans could have guessed what was going to follow, especially following the 5–6 debacle of the previous season, which represented the first season Iowa had not gone to a bowl since 1980.

=== At Michigan State ===
Iowa at #18 Michigan State

Team	1	2	3	4	Total
• Hawkeyes	0	9	0	3	12
Spartans	0	0	0	7	7

- Date: October 6
- Location: Spartan Stadium
  East Lansing, MI
- Game start: 11:00 AM CDT
- Game attendance: 76,873
- Sources: Box Score and Game Story

Scoring summary
2	IOWA	Skillett 31-yard field goal	IOWA 3–0
2	IOWA	Nick Bell 5-yard pass from Matt Rodgers (kick failed)	IOWA 9–0
4	MSU	Hickson 6-yard run (Langeloh kick)	IOWA 9–7
4	IOWA	Skillett 34-yard field goal	IOWA 12–7

In opening Big Ten play, Iowa started what ended up being their third Rose Bowl run in ten seasons. What set this conference season apart from others was that the Hawkeyes played most of their best football on the road. In weeks 1, 3, and 5, Iowa upset what ended up being the other three teams that tied for the Big 10 championship that season, all at their home venue. First was a wind-blown, defensive struggle at East Lansing, with Iowa holding onto a 12–7 victory. Hayden Fry admitted after the game that every pass he had Matt Rodgers throw was with the wind, which was blowing at a diagonal across Spartan Stadium.

=== Wisconsin ===
Wisconsin at #25 Iowa
rivalry Game

Team	1	2	3	4	Total
Badgers	0	10	0	0	10
• Hawkeyes	3	9	0	18	30

- Date: October 13
- Location: Kinnick Stadium
  Iowa City, IA
- Game start: 1:00 PM CDT
- Game attendance: 69,890
- Television network: IPTV
- Sources: Box Score and Game Story

Scoring summary
1	IOWA	Skillett 45-yard field goal	IOWA 3–0
2	WIS	Thompson 37-yard field goal	Tied 3–3
2	WIS	Williams 20-yard run (Thompson kick)	WIS 10–3
2	IOWA	Stewart 33-yard run (Skillett kick)	Tied 10–10
2	IOWA	Safety, Polly tackled Mahone in end zone	IOWA 12–10
4	IOWA	Nick Bell 3-yard run (Rodgers run)	IOWA 20–10
4	IOWA	Skillett 35-yard field goal	IOWA 23–10
4	IOWA	Olejniczak 34-yard interception return (Skillett kick)	IOWA 30–10

After falling behind 10–3, the Hawkeyes scored the final 27 points of the game to earn a victory over the Badgers in the first meeting between Hayden Fry and former Iowa assistant Barry Alvarez.

=== At Michigan ===
#23 Iowa at #10 Michigan

Team	1	2	3	4	Total
• Hawkeyes	0	7	3	14	24
Wolverines	7	7	6	3	23

- Date: October 20
- Location: Michigan Stadium
  Ann Arbor, MI
- Game attendance: 105,517
- Game weather: 60 °F (16 °C), Sunny, mild and breezy, Wind ESE 13–20 mph (21–32 km/h)
- TV announcers (ESPN): Wayne Larrivee
- Sources: Box Score and Game Story

Scoring summary
1	2:10	MICH	Vaughn 2-yard run (Carlson kick)	Michigan 7–0
2	11:25	IOWA	Hughes 4-yard pass from Rodgers (Skillett kick)	Tied 7–7
2	7:34	MICH	Jefferson 7-yard run (Carlson kick)	Michigan 14–7
3	8:18	IOWA	Skillett 32-yard field goal	Michigan 14–10
3	4:35	MICH	Ware 7-yard blocked punt return (run failed)	Michigan 20–10
4	12:16	IOWA	Rodgers 1-yard run (Skillett kick)	Michigan 20–17
4	4:27	MICH	Carlson 47-yard field goal	Michigan 23–17
4	1:09	IOWA	Kujawa 1-yard run (Skillett kick)	IOWA 24–23

After a win over (what ended up being cellar-dweller) Wisconsin at home, Iowa traveled to the Big House in Ann Arbor. The Wolverines were still smarting after a tight, tough loss the previous week against Michigan State and it was Homecoming week. But Iowa kept it close throughout. Following a botched two-point conversion by the Wolverines after they had taken a 20–10 lead, the Hawkeyes went to work. Following one Hawkeye touchdown countered by a Michigan field goal, the Hawkeyes put together a drive for the ages, never facing a third-down. Tony Stewart grabbed the last of a series of key passes from Matt Rodgers with one hand, giving the Hawkeyes the ball at the Michigan 1-yard line. Paul Kujawa ran it in from there, and with the extra point, the Hawks took the lead by the eventual final score of 24–23. A sack by Moses Santos and an interception by linebacker John Derby sealed the stunner. It was Michigan's first loss on Homecoming since the 1967 season.

=== Northwestern ===
Northwestern at #15 Iowa

Team	1	2	3	4	Total
Wildcats	0	0	7	7	14
• Hawkeyes	6	29	14	7	56

- Date: October 27
- Location: Kinnick Stadium
  Iowa City, IA
- Game attendance: 69,501
- Sources: Box Score and Game Story

Scoring summary
1	IOWA	Nick Bell 4-yard run (kick blocked)	IOWA 6–0
2	IOWA	Titley 3-yard pass from Matt Rodgers (Kujawa pass from Rodgers)	IOWA 14–0
2	IOWA	Nick Bell 16-yard run (Skillett kick)	Tied 21–0
2	IOWA	Danan Hughes 11-yard pass from Rodgers (Skillett kick)	IOWA 28–0
2	IOWA	Nick Bell 26-yard run (Skillett kick)	IOWA 35–0
3	NW	Zipfel 2-yard pass from Williams (Adler kick)	IOWA 35–7
3	IOWA	Lampkin 3-yard run (Skillett kick)	IOWA 42–7
3	IOWA	Middleton 7-yard run (Skillett kick)	IOWA 49–7
4	IOWA	Lampkin 5-yard run (Skillett kick)	IOWA 56–7
4	NW	Krebs 3-yard run (Adler kick)	IOWA 56–14

Nick Bell rushed 16 times for 136 yards and 3 touchdowns. Tony Stewart added 122 yards on 15 carries as the Hawkeyes rushed for 371 yards.

=== At Illinois ===
#13 Iowa at #5 Illinois

Team	1	2	3	4	Total
• Hawkeyes	21	14	9	10	54
Fighting Illini	0	14	0	14	28

- Date: November 3
- Location: Memorial Stadium
  Champaign, IL
- Game start: 2:30 CDT
- Game attendance: 72,714
- Game weather: Overcast, Wind 15–20 mph (24–32 km/h)
- Referee: Gil Marchman
- TV announcers (ABC): Keith Jackson, Bob Griese, and Jack Arute
- Sources: [ Box score]

Scoring summary
1	13:11	IOWA	Mike Saunders 5-yard pass from Matt Rodgers (Skillett kick)	IOWA 7–0
1	4:20	IOWA	Danan Hughes 3-yard pass from Tony Stewart (Skillett kick)	IOWA 14–0
1	2:01	IOWA	Nick Bell 25-yard run (Skillett kick)	IOWA 21–0
2	10:09	IOWA	Nick Bell 1-yard run (Skillett kick)	IOWA 28–0
2	6:10	Illinois	Wax 20-yard pass from Verduzco (Higgins kick)	IOWA 28–7
2	3:37	IOWA	Matt Whitaker 14-yard pass from Jim Hartlieb (Skillett kick)	IOWA 35–7
2	1:43	Illinois	Lester 2-yard pass from Verduzco (Higgins kick)	IOWA 35–14
3	9:12	IOWA	Danan Hughes 17-yard pass from Matt Rodgers (kick failed)	IOWA 41–14
3	5:20	IOWA	Skillet 29-yard field goal	IOWA 44–14
4	13:08	Illinois	Wax 9-yard pass from Verduzco (Higgins kick)	IOWA 44–21
4	10:44	IOWA	Matt Rodgers 1-yard run (Skillett kick)	IOWA 51–21
4	9:50	Illinois	Wax 5-yard pass from Verduzco (Higgins kick)	IOWA 51–28
4	3:39	IOWA	Skillett 22-yard field goal	IOWA 54–28

The Hawks key road triumphs weren't finished as they traveled to Champaign, Illinois. Against an Illinois team that had the inside track to the Rose Bowl, Iowa put together one of their best offensive games in the Fry era, especially for a key road game. The Hawkeyes used an early fumble by the Illini to begin an exhibition by RB Nick Bell, the likes of which had rarely been seen in the Big 10 between two undefeated teams (in conference play). Bell literally ran over the Illini, scampering for 130 yards in the 1st quarter alone. The Hawks led by an amazing 28–0 early in the second quarter, and they stretched it to 44–14 by the end of the 3rd quarter, before settling for a 54–28 final. It was most likely from the efforts of that game that Nick Bell was named by the media as the Big 10 player of the year.

=== Ohio State ===
Ohio State at #6 Iowa

Team	1	2	3	4	Total
• Buckeyes	0	14	0	13	27
Hawkeyes	7	10	3	6	26

- Date: November 10
- Location: Kinnick Stadium
  Iowa City, IA
- Game start: 11:00 AM CST
- Game attendance: 70,033
- TV announcers (ABC): Brent Musburger and Dick Vermeil
- Sources: Box Score and Game Story

Scoring summary
1	11:12	IOWA	Rodgers 3-yard run (Skillett kick)	Iowa 7–0
2	14:58	OSU	Frey 1-yard run (Williams kick)	Tied 7–7
2	9:04	IOWA	Skillett 34-yard field goal	Iowa 10–7
2	2:17	IOWA	Montgomery 1-yard run (Skillett kick)	Iowa 17–7
2	0:00	OSU	J. Graham 48-yard pass from Frey (Williams kick)	Iowa 17–14
3	0:23	IOWA	Skillett 37-yard field goal	Iowa 20–14
4	11:00	IOWA	Montgomery 1-yard run (run failed)	Iowa 26–14
4	6:34	OSU	Olive 21-yard pass from Frey (Williams kick)	Iowa 26–21
4	0:01	OSU	Olive 3-yard pass from Frey (run failed)	Ohio St 27–26

The Hawkeye bubble burst in Iowa City with a last-second loss to Ohio State. Buckeye WR Bobby Olive caught the game winning TD, his second scoring reception of the 4th quarter, from QB Greg Frey with 0:01 left on the clock. Ohio State also scored a 48-yard touchdown as the first half expired.

Game statistics	OHIO ST	IOWA
First downs	13	19
Rushes–yards	29–55	53–199
Passing yards	223	172
Total yards	278	371
Penalties	11–93	7–55
Turnovers	1	2
Time of possession	25:28	34:32

=== Purdue ===
Purdue at #13 Iowa

Team	1	2	3	4	Total
Boilermakers	0	3	0	6	9
• Hawkeyes	7	7	10	14	38

- Date: November 17
- Location: Kinnick Stadium
  Iowa City, IA
- Game start: 2:30 PM CST
- Game attendance: 67,636
- TV announcers (ABC): Brent Musburger and Dick Vermeil
- Sources: Box Score and Game Story

Scoring summary
1	IOWA	Stewart 7-yard pass from Rodgers (Skillett kick)	IOWA 7–0
2	PUR	Wambold 39-yard field goal	IOWA 7–3
2	IOWA	Hughes 14-yard pass from Rodgers (Skillett kick)	IOWA 14–3
3	IOWA	Stewart 30-yard pass from Rodgers (Skillett kick)	IOWA 21–3
3	IOWA	Skillett 21-yard field goal	IOWA 24–3
4	IOWA	Smith 5-yard pass from Rodgers (Skillett kick)	IOWA 31–3
4	PUR	Hunter 7-yard run (kick failed)	IOWA 31–9
4	IOWA	Lampkin 15-yard run (Skillett kick)	IOWA 38–9

The Hawkeyes, entering as 26-point favorites, bounced back with what proved to be a Big 10-clinching win at home against Purdue.

=== At Minnesota ===
#13 Iowa at Minnesota
Battle for Floyd of Rosedale

Team	1	2	3	4	Total
Hawkeyes	0	10	7	7	24
• Golden Gophers	7	14	3	7	31

- Date: November 24
- Location: Hubert H. Humphrey Metrodome
  Minneapolis, MN
- Game start: 1:30 PM CDT
- Game attendance: 64,694
- Sources: Box Score and Game Story

Scoring summary
1	MINN	Smith 3-yard run (Berglund kick)	MINN 7–0
2	IOWA	Skillett 32-yard field goal	MINN 7–3
2	IOWA	Montgomery 1-yard run (Skillett kick)	IOWA 10–7
2	MINN	Smith 1-yard run (Berglund kick)	MINN 14–10
2	MINN	Joiner recovered blocked punt in end zone (Berglund kick)	MINN 21–10
3	MINN	Berglund 33-yard field goal	MINN 24–10
3	IOWA	Titley 4-yard pass from Rodgers (Skillett kick)	MINN 24–17
4	MINN	Joiner 28-yard pass from Fleetwood (Berglund kick)	MINN 31–17
4	IOWA	Nick Bell 39-yard run (Skillett kick)	MINN 31–24

Knowing that they were Rose Bowl-bound before they even took the field, the Hawkeyes dropped their final road game at Minnesota, 31–24. In that game, Tony Stewart became the Hawkeyes all-time leading rusher (at least at that time), though he lost a key fumble on that play.

=== Rose Bowl ===
#17 Iowa vs. #8 Washington

Team	1	2	3	4	Total
Hawkeyes	0	7	7	20	34
• Huskies	10	23	6	7	46

- Date: January 1, 1991
- Location: Rose Bowl
  Pasadena, CA
- Game attendance: 101,273
- Referee: Pat Flood
- TV announcers (ABC): Keith Jackson, Bob Griese, and Jack Arute
- Sources: [Box score]

Scoring summary
1	Wash	Hanson 23-yard field goal	Wash 3–0
1	Wash	Hall 27-yard return of blocked punt (Hanson kick)	Wash 10–0
2	Iowa	Nick Bell 15-yard run (Skillett kick)	Wash 10–7
2	Wash	Hanson 34-yard field goal	Wash 13–7
2	Wash	Mincy 37-yard interception return (pass failed)	Wash 19–7
2	Wash	Mark Brunell 5-yard run (Hanson kick)	Wash 26–7
2	Wash	Mario Bailey 22-yard pass from Mark Brunell (Hanson kick)	Wash 33–7
3	Iowa	Matt Rodgers 7-yard run (Skillett kick)	Wash 33–14
3	Wash	Mark Brunell 20-yard run (run failed)	Wash 39–14
4	Iowa	Matt Rodgers 9-yard run (run failed)	Wash 39–20
4	Iowa	Nick Bell 20-yard run (pass failed)	Wash 39–26
4	Wash	Mario Bailey 31-yard pass from Mark Brunell (Hanson kick)	Wash 46–26
4	Iowa	Saunders 12-yard pass from Rodgers (Velicer pass from Rodgers)	Wash 46–34

The Rose Bowl placed an over-matched Iowa against one of the best teams in the country that season, the Washington Huskies, led by head coach Don James. The Hawkeyes trailed badly at the half and trailed 39–14 after three quarters. With Washington reserves taking over in the fourth quarter, Iowa scored two touchdowns to draw within thirteen. With another Washington touchdown the margin was back to twenty, and Iowa's late last score and conversion brought them to within a dozen where the game ended, 46–34. It was Hayden Fry's last trip to Pasadena, and he ended up 0–3 in those games.

== Roster ==
1990 Iowa Hawkeyes football team roster
Players
Coaches
Offense

Pos.	#	Name	Class
OL	75	Greg Aegerter	Sr
WR	81	Jeff Anttila	Fr
OT	78	Rob Baxley	Jr
RB	43	Nick Bell	Sr
TE	87	Alan Cross	So
OT	65	Scott Davis	So
C	60	Mike Devlin	So
WR	82	Jon Filloon	Jr
WR	3	Danan Hughes	So
OL	69	Mike Miller	Sr
FB	34	Lew Montgomery	So
QB	7	Matt Rodgers	Jr
RB	32	Mike Saunders	Jr
WR	22	Sean Smith	Sr
RB	21	Tony Stewart	Sr
TE	84	Michael Titley	Sr
OL	61	Dave Turner	Jr
OL	73	Ted Velicer	So
FB	46	Matt Whitaker	So
RB	23	Paul Kujawa	So

Defense

Pos.	#	Name	Class
DL	91	Bret Bielema	So
DB	17	Phil Bradley	Jr
DB	29	Greg Brown	Sr
FS	18	Doug Buch	So
DB	19	Gary Clark	Jr
NG	88	Maurea Crain	Fr
NG	54	Rod Davis	Jr
LB	31	John Derby	Jr
LB	49	Teddy Joe Faley	So
LB	66	Melvin Foster	Sr
DE	96	Ron Geater	Jr
CB	45	Merton Hanks	Sr
DB	5	Carlos James	So
DT	71	Jim Johnson	Sr
DT	93	Jeff Nelson	So
CB	27	Eddie Polly	Jr
DT	57	Matt Ruhland	Sr
DE	99	Moses Santos	Jr
DE	8	Leroy Smith	Jr
DL	64	Mike Wells	Fr
SS	15	Brian Wise	Jr

Special teams

Pos.	#	Name	Class
K	11	Jeff Skillett	Jr

Head coach

- Hayden Fry

Coordinators/assistant coaches

- Carl Jackson – Offensive Coordinator
- Bill Brashier – Defensive Coordinator
- Don Patterson – Quarterbacks/Wide receivers
- Bernie Wyatt – Recruiting Coordinator
- Bill Dervich – Strength and Conditioning
- Milan Vooletich – Defensive ends

Legend

- (C) Team captain
- (S) Suspended
- (I) Ineligible
- Injured
- Redshirt

== Postseason awards ==
- Hayden Fry – Big Ten Coach of the Year
- Nick Bell and Matt Rodgers – co-Big Ten Offensive Player of the Year (coaches)
- Merton Hanks – All-American Defensive Back (Newspaper Enterprise Association)

== Team players in the 1991 NFL draft ==
Round	Pick	Player	Position	NFL club
2	43	Nick Bell	Running Back	Los Angeles Raiders
5	122	Merton Hanks	Defensive Back	San Francisco 49ers
10	275	Michael Titley	Tight End	Miami Dolphins
11	297	Tony Stewart	Running Back	Seattle Seahawks

== Other notable players ==
- Bret Bielema, nose guard – Head coach at Wisconsin, 2006–2012, Head coach at Arkansas, 2013–2017.
