= 1990 Wisconsin Badgers football team =

American college football season

1990 Wisconsin Badgers football
- Conference: Big Ten Conference
- Record: 1–10 (0–8 Big Ten)
- Head coach: Barry Alvarez (1st season)
- Offensive coordinator: Russ Jacques (1st season)
- Offensive scheme: Multiple
- Defensive coordinator: Dan McCarney (1st season)
- Base defense: 3–4
- MVP: Don Davey
- Captains: Don Davey; Tony Lowery; Nick Polczinski; Greg Thomas
- Home stadium: Camp Randall Stadium

1990 Big Ten Conference football standings
	Conf.					Overall
Team	W		L		T	W		L		T
No. 7 Michigan +	6	–	2	–	0	9	–	3	–	0
No. 16 Michigan State +	6	–	2	–	0	8	–	3	–	1
No. 25 Illinois +	6	–	2	–	0	8	–	4	–	0
No. 18 Iowa +	6	–	2	–	0	8	–	4	–	0
Ohio State	5	–	2	–	1	7	–	4	–	1
Minnesota	5	–	3	–	0	6	–	5	–	0
Indiana	3	–	4	–	1	6	–	5	–	1
Northwestern	1	–	7	–	0	2	–	9	–	0
Purdue	1	–	7	–	0	2	–	9	–	0
Wisconsin	0	–	8	–	0	1	–	10	–	0
+ – Conference co-champions; Rankings from AP Poll

The 1990 Wisconsin Badgers football team represented the University of Wisconsin–Madison as a member of the Big Ten Conference during the 1990 NCAA Division I-A football season. Led by first-year head coach Barry Alvarez, the Badgers compiled an overall record of 1–10 with a mark of 0–8 in conference play, placing last out of ten teams in the Big Ten. Wisconsin played home games at Camp Randall Stadium in Madison, Wisconsin.

== Schedule ==
Date	Time	Opponent	Site	TV	Result	Attendance	Source
September 8	11:30 a.m.	California*	Camp Randall Stadium; Madison, WI	ESPN	L 12–28	45,980	
September 15	1:05 p.m.	Ball State*	Camp Randall Stadium; Madison, WI		W 24–7	44,698	
September 22	1:05 p.m.	Temple*	Camp Randall Stadium; Madison, WI		L 18–24	41,817	
October 6	1:05 p.m.	No. 3 Michigan	Camp Randall Stadium; Madison, WI		L 3–41	64,359	
October 13	1:00 p.m.	at No. 25 Iowa	Kinnick Stadium; Iowa City, IA (rivalry)		L 10–30	69,890	
October 20	1:00 p.m.	at Northwestern	Dyche Stadium; Evanston, IL		L 34–44	32,966	
October 27	1:05 p.m.	No. 5 Illinois^{†}	Camp Randall Stadium; Madison, WI		L 3–21	67,746	
November 3	1:05 p.m.	Minnesota	Camp Randall Stadium; Madison, WI (rivalry)		L 3–21	51,189	
November 10	12:00 p.m.	at Indiana	Memorial Stadium; Bloomington, IN		L 7–20	45,093	
November 17	1:05 p.m.	No. 18 Ohio State	Camp Randall Stadium; Madison, WI		L 10–35	41,403	
November 24	12:00 p.m.	at No. 24 Michigan State	Spartan Stadium; East Lansing, MI		L 9–14	60,517	
*Non-conference game; ^{†}Homecoming; Rankings from AP Poll released prior to the game; All times are in Central time; Source:

== Personnel ==
1990 Wisconsin Badgers football team roster
Players
Coaches
Offense

Pos.	#	Name	Class
G	55	Jim Basten	Sr
G	75	Chuck Belin	So
TE	84	Jim Bourne	So
QB, P	20	Brad Brekke	Sr
WR	19	Aaron Brown	So
WR	85	Tom Browne, Jr	Jr
FB	33	George Chaconas	Sr
WR	13	Lionell Crawford	Jr
LB	88	Dave Czech	Fr
FB	38	Keith Ellison	So
C	52	Rick Godfrey	Jr
WR, S	10	Reggie Holt	Fr
RB	8	Rory Lee	Fr
QB	14	Tony Lowery (C)	Jr
WR	5	Mark Mangum	Jr
G	65	Jeff Miller	Sr
TE	89	Kerry Miller	Sr
RB	16	Mark Montgomery	Fr
OT	78	Brady Pierce	Sr
G	56	Nick Polczinski (C)	Sr
OT	50	David Rapps	Sr
RB	25	Rafael Robinson	Jr
OT	53	David Senczyszyn	Sr
WR	23	Tony Spaeth	So
WR	43	Mike Tams	Sr
WR	15	Tim Ware	So
WR	86	Bill Williams, Jr	Sr
TB	3	Robert Williams	Jr
QB	9	Sean Wilson	So
FB	32	Jeff Wirth	So

Defense

Pos.	#	Name	Class
S	11	Mike Barker	Jr
DT	70	Matt Barkley	Jr
DL	94	Dan Batsch	Sr
LB	42	Yusef Burgess	Fr
LB	57	Gary Casper	So
DB	26	Pat Cleary	Sr
LB	88	Dave Czech	Fr
DT	91	Don Davey (C)	Sr
DT	69	John Filiatrout	Jr
CB	7	Eddie Fletcher, Jr	Jr
DT	92	Carlos Fowler	Fr
WR, S	10	Reggie Holt	Fr
LB	58	Malvin Hunter	Sr
LB	47	Malcolm Johnson	Jr
NT	53	Lee Krueger	Fr
LB	42	Brendan Lynch	Jr
S	6	Tyrone Mahone	Sr
CB	3	Korey Manley	So
LB	49	Curt Maternowski	Jr
DL	90	Pat McGettigan	So
S	37	Scott Nelson	Fr
LB	46	Robert Newell	Sr
LB	48	Aaron Norvell	So
NT	55	Lamark Shackerford	Fr
DB	38	Henry Searcy	Fr
LB	36	Duer Sharp	Jr
S	27	Greg Thomas (C)	Sr
NT	96	Patrick Thompson	So
DB	5	Mel Tucker	Fr
CB	22	Troy Vincent	Jr
CB	21	LaMarr White	Sr

Special teams

Pos.	#	Name	Class
QB, P	20	Brad Brekke	Sr
P	11	Mike Mullen	Sr
K, P	18	Rich Thompson	So

Head coach

- Barry Alvarez

Coordinators/assistant coaches

- Russ Jacques – Offensive Coordinator/Quarterbacks/Receivers
- Dan McCarney – Defensive Coordinator/Defensive Line
- Dave Anderson – Outside Linebackers
- Bill Callahan – Offensive Line
- Kevin Cosgrove – Inside Linebackers
- Paul Jette – Defensive Backs
- Scott Seeliger – Offensive Tackles/Tight Ends
- Paul Winters – Running Backs
- Bernie Wyatt – Recruiting Coordinator/Defensive Assistant Coach

Legend

- (C) Team captain
- (S) Suspended
- (I) Ineligible
- Injured
- Redshirt

== 1991 NFL draft ==
Player	Position	Round	Pick	NFL club
Don Davey	Defensive end	3	67	Green Bay Packers
Brady Pierce	Tackle	10	259	Minnesota Vikings
