= 1990 Notre Dame Fighting Irish football team =

American college football season

1990 Notre Dame Fighting Irish football

Orange Bowl, L 9–10 vs. Colorado
- Conference: Independent

Ranking
- Coaches: No. 6
- AP: No. 6
- Record: 9–3
- Head coach: Lou Holtz (5th season)
- Offensive scheme: Wishbone triple option
- Defensive coordinator: Gary Darnell (1st season)
- Base defense: 4–3
- MVP: Rocket Ismail
- Captains: Mike Heldt; Chris Zorich; Todd Lyght; Ricky Watters
- Home stadium: Notre Dame Stadium

1990 NCAA Division I-A independents football records
	Conf.			Overall
Team	W	L	T	W		L		T
No. 14 Louisville		–		10	–	1	–	1
No. 3 Miami (FL)		–		10	–	2	–	0
No. 4 Florida State		–		10	–	2	–	0
No. 6 Notre Dame		–		9	–	3	–	0
No. 11 Penn State		–		9	–	3	–	0
Louisiana Tech		–		8	–	3	–	1
Southern Miss		–		8	–	4	–	0
Temple		–		7	–	4	–	0
Syracuse		–		7	–	4	–	2
Army		–		6	–	5	–	0
Northern Illinois		–		6	–	5	–	0
South Carolina		–		6	–	5	–	0
Virginia Tech		–		6	–	5	–	0
East Carolina		–		5	–	6	–	0
Southwestern Louisiana		–		5	–	6	–	0
Navy		–		5	–	6	–	0
Memphis State		–		4	–	6	–	1
Boston College		–		4	–	7	–	0
Tulane		–		4	–	7	–	0
West Virginia		–		4	–	7	–	0
Akron		–		3	–	7	–	1
Pittsburgh		–		3	–	7	–	1
Rutgers		–		3	–	8	–	0
Tulsa		–		3	–	8	–	0
Cincinnati		–		1	–	10	–	0
Rankings from AP Poll

The 1990 Notre Dame Fighting Irish football team was an American football team that represented the University of Notre Dame as an independent during the 1990 NCAA Division I-A football season. In their fifth year under head coach Lou Holtz, the Irish compiled a 9–3 record, outscored opponents by a total of 350 to 249, and were ranked No. 6 in the final AP and UPI polls. Ranked No. 1 in the preseason AP poll, the Irish dropped to No. 8 after losing to unranked Stanford, but regained the No. 1 spot after defeating No. 1 Miami (FL). They then lost two of the last three games, including a loss to No. 1 Colorado in the Orange Bowl.

Senior nose tackle Chris Zorich won the Lombardi Award and was selected as the team's most valuable player. Wide receiver and return specialist Rocket Ismail finished second in the Heisman trophy voting. Zorich, Ismail, linebacker Michael Stonebreaker, and defensive back Todd Lyght were consensus first-team picks on the 1990 All-America college football team. The team's statistical leaders included quarterback Rick Mirer (1,824 passing yards), running back Rodney Culver (710 rushing yards), Ismail (1,723 all-purpose yards), and Stonebreaker (95 tackles).

The team played its home games at Notre Dame Stadium in Notre Dame, Indiana.

== Schedule ==
Date	Time	Opponent	Rank	Site	TV	Result	Attendance	Source
September 15	8:00 p.m.	No. 4 Michigan	No. 1	Notre Dame Stadium; Notre Dame, IN (rivalry)	CBS	W 28–24	59,075	
September 22	2:30 p.m.	at No. 24 Michigan State	No. 1	Spartan Stadium; East Lansing, MI (rivalry)	ABC	W 20–19	80,401	
September 29	12:00 p.m.	Purdue	No. 1	Notre Dame Stadium; Notre Dame, IN (rivalry)	SportsChannel	W 37–11	59,075	
October 6	12:00 p.m.	Stanford	No. 1	Notre Dame Stadium; Notre Dame, IN (rivalry)		L 31–36	59,075	
October 13	12:00 p.m.	Air Force	No. 8	Notre Dame Stadium; Notre Dame, IN (rivalry)		W 57–27	59,075	
October 20	2:30 p.m.	No. 2 Miami (FL)	No. 6	Notre Dame Stadium; Notre Dame, IN (rivalry)	CBS	W 29–20	59,075	
October 27	6:45 p.m.	at Pittsburgh	No. 3	Pitt Stadium; Pittsburgh, PA (rivalry)	ESPN	W 31–22	56,500	
November 3	12:00 p.m.	vs. Navy	No. 2	Giants Stadium; East Rutherford, NJ (rivalry)		W 52–31	70,382	
November 10	2:30 p.m.	at No. 9 Tennessee	No. 1	Neyland Stadium; Knoxville, TN	CBS	W 34–29	97,123	
November 17	4:00 p.m.	No. 18 Penn State	No. 1	Notre Dame Stadium; Notre Dame, IN (rivalry)	ESPN	L 21–24	59,075	
November 24	8:00 p.m.	at No. 18 USC	No. 7	Los Angeles Memorial Coliseum; Los Angeles, CA (rivalry)	ABC	W 10–6	91,639	
January 1, 1991	8:00 p.m.	vs. No. 1 Colorado	No. 5	Miami Orange Bowl; Miami, FL (Orange Bowl)	NBC	L 9–10	77,062	
Rankings from AP Poll released prior to the game; All times are in Eastern time

== Game summaries ==
=== Michigan ===
#4 Michigan Wolverines (0–0) at #1 Notre Dame Fighting Irish (0–0)

Quarter	1	2	3	4	Total
Michigan	3	7	14	0	24
Notre Dame	14	0	0	14	28

at Notre Dame Stadium, South Bend, Indiana

- Date: September 15
- Game time: 8:05 p.m. EST
- Game attendance: 59,075
- Box Score

Game information

First quarter

- ND – Rick Mirer 2-yard run (Craig Hentrich kick), 11:28. Notre Dame 7–0.
- MICH – J.D. Carlson 38-yard field goal, 7:01. Notre Dame 7–3.
- ND – Reggie Brooks 2-yard run (Craig Hentrich kick), 1:59. Notre Dame 14–3.

Second quarter

- MICH – Desmond Howard 25-yard pass from Elvis Grbac (J.D. Carlson kick), 3:56. Notre Dame 14–10.

Third quarter

- MICH – Allen Jefferson 1-yard run (J.D. Carlson), 7:49. Michigan 17–14.
- MICH – Desmond Howard 25-yard pass from Elvis Grbac (J.D. Carlson kick), 7:33. Michigan 24–14.

Fourth quarter

- ND – Rodney Culver 1-yard run (Craig Hentrich kick), 12:59. Michigan 24–21.
- ND – Adrian Jarrell 18-yard pass from Rick Mirer (Craig Hentrich kick), 1:40. Notre Dame 28–24.

Top passers

- MICH – Elvis Grbac – 17/30, 190 yards, 2 TD, 2 INT
- ND – Rick Mirer – 14/23, 165 yards, TD

Top rushers

- MICH – Jon Vaughn – 22 rushes, 201 yards
- ND – Rodney Culver – 19 rushes, 95 yards, TD

Top receivers

- MICH – Desmond Howard – 6 receptions, 133 yards, 2 TD
- ND – Raghib Ismail – 4 receptions, 42 yards

=== Michigan State ===
#1 Notre Dame at #24 Michigan State

Team	1	2	3	4	Total
• Fighting Irish	7	0	0	14	21
Spartans	0	12	7	0	19

- Date: September 22
- Location: Spartan Stadium, East Lansing, MI
- Game start: 3:30 p.m. EST
- TV announcers (ABC): Keith Jackson and Bob Griese

Scoring summary
1		ND	Watters 5 yard run (Hentrich kick)	ND 7-0
2		MSU	Langeloh 42 yard field goal	ND 7-3
2		MSU	Safety, blocked punt out of end zone	ND 7-5
2		MSU	Hickson 1 yard run (Langeloh kick)	MSU 12-7
3		MSU	Duckett 1 yard run (Langeloh kick)	MSU 19-7
4	13:13	ND	Watters 2 yard run (Hentrich kick)	MSU 19-14
4	0:34	ND	Culver 1 yard run (Hentrich kick)	ND 21-19

The Immaculate Deflection - Rick Mirer's 24-yard completion to Adrian Jarrell, which bounced off hands of MSU LB Todd Murray up and into Jarrell's arms at MSU 2. Three plays later, Culver scored. "There's definitely somebody looking out for us. There's somebody on our side," said Mirer.

- Notre Dame's 60th victory as No. 1 ranked team & 5-0-1 vs. MSU when ranked #1

=== Stanford ===
Stanford at #1 Notre Dame

Team	1	2	3	4	Total
• Cardinal	7	8	14	7	36
Fighting Irish	7	17	7	0	31

- Date: September 22
- Location: Notre Dame Stadium, South Bend, IN
- Game attendance: 59,075

Scoring summary
1	ND	Mirer 1 yard run (Hentrich kick)	ND 7-0
1	Sta	Milburn 9 run (Hopkins kick)	Tied 7-7
2	ND	Hentrich 29 yard field goal	ND 10-7
2	ND	T. Smith 11 yard pass from Mirer (Hentrich kick)	ND 17-7
2	ND	T. Smith 15 yard pass from Mirer (Hentrich kick)	ND 24-7
2	Sta	Vardell 1 yard run (Palumbis to McCafferty pass)	ND 24-15
3	Sta	Vardell 1 yard run (Hopkins kick)	ND 24-22
3	ND	Culver 1 yard run (Hentrich kick)	ND 31-22
3	Sta	Vardell 1 yard run (Hopkins kick)	ND 31-29
4	Sta	Vardell 1 yard run (Hopkins kick)	Sta 36-31

=== Miami (FL) ===
#2 Miami (FL) at #6 Notre Dame

Team	1	2	3	4	Total
Hurricanes	10	7	0	3	20
• Fighting Irish	10	6	6	7	29

- Date: October 20
- Location: Notre Dame Stadium, South Bend, IN
- Game start: 2:40 p.m. EST
- Game attendance: 59,075
- Referee: Dick Burleson
- TV announcers (CBS): Jim Nantz and Tim Brant

Scoring summary
Q1	12:17	MIA	McGuire 1-yard run (Huerta kick)	MIA 7–0
Q1	6:51	ND	Hentrich-25 yard field goal	MIA 7–3
Q1	1:43	MIA	Huerta 23-yard field goal	MIA 10–3
Q1		ND	Ismail 94-yard kickoff return (Hentrich kick)	Tie 10–10
Q2	11:48	ND	Hentrich-44 yard field goal	ND 13–10
Q2	8:10	MIA	Erickson-1 yard run (Huerta kick)	MIA 17–13
Q2	4:16	ND	Hentrich-34 yard field goal	MIA 17–16
Q3	5:24	ND	Hentrich-36 yard field goal	ND 19–17
Q3	1:45	ND	Hentrich 35-yard field goal	ND 22–17
Q4	14:01	MIA	Huerta 25-yard field goal	ND 22–20
Q4	6:16	ND	Culver 21-yard pass from Mirer (Hentrich kick)	ND 29–20

=== Navy ===
#2 Notre Dame vs. Navy

Team	1	2	3	4	Total
• Fighting Irish	7	3	21	21	52
Midshipmen	0	10	7	14	31

- Date: November 3
- Location: Giants Stadium
- Game attendance: 70,382

Scoring summary
Q1	ND	Bettis 1 yard run (Hentrich kick)	ND 7–0
Q2	NAVY	Pace 1 yard run (Schenk kick)	Tie 7–7
Q2	ND	Hentrich 31 yard field goal	ND 10–7
Q2	NAVY	Schenk 27 yard field goal	Tie 10–10
Q3	ND	Culver 7 yard run (Hentrich kick)	ND 17–10
Q3	ND	Watters 2 yard run (Hentrich kick)	ND 24–10
Q3	ND	Mirer 30 yard run (Hentrich kick)	ND 31–10
Q3	NAVY	Grizzard 6 yard run (Schenk kick)	ND 31–17
Q4	ND	Brooks 3 yard run (Hentrich kick)	ND 38–17
Q4	NAVY	Berghutt 19 yard pass from Grizzard (Schenk kick)	ND 38–24
Q4	ND	Ismail 54 yard pass from Mirer (Hentrich kick)	ND 45–24
Q4	NAVY	Mason 7 yard pass from Grizzard (Schenk kick)	ND 45–31
Q4	ND	Lyght 53 yard kickoff return (Hentrich kick)	ND 52–31

=== Tennessee ===
#1 Notre Dame at #9 Tennessee

Team	1	2	3	4	Total
• Fighting Irish	7	3	7	17	34
Volunteers	6	0	14	9	29

- Date: November 10
- Location: Neyland Stadium, Knoxville, TN
- Game start: 3:30 p.m. EST
- Referee: Jimmy Harper
- TV announcers (CBS): Jim Nantz and Tim Brant

Scoring summary
1	TEN	Burke 46 yard field goal	TEN 3-0
1	ND	Culver 59 yard pass from Mirer (Hentrich kick)	ND 7-3
1	TEN	Burke 22 yard field goal	ND 7-6
2	ND	Hentrich 26 yard field goal	ND 10-6
3	TEN	Thompson 10 yard run (Burke kick)	TEN 13-10
3	ND	Watters 68 yard run (Hentrich kick)	ND 17-13
3	TEN	Harper 32 yard pass from Kelly (Burke kick)	TEN 20-17
4	ND	Hentrich 20 yard field goal	Tied 20-20
4	TEN	Burke 45 yard field goal	TEN 23-20
4	ND	Watters 10 yard run (Hentrich kick)	ND 27-23
4	ND	Ismail 44 yard run (Hentrich kick)	ND 34-23
4	TEN	Harper 23 yard pass from Kelly (pass failed)	ND 34-29

The Irish traveled to Knoxville and pulled off a thrilling 34–29 victory over the 9th-ranked Tennessee Vols. The Irish built a 4th quarter lead and held off a furious late comeback by Tennessee.

=== Colorado (Orange Bowl) ===
#5 Notre Dame vs. #1 Colorado

Team	1	2	3	4	Total
Fighting Irish	0	6	3	0	9
• Buffaloes	0	3	7	0	10

- Date: January 1
- Location: Miami Orange Bowl, Miami, FL
- Game attendance: 77,062
- TV announcers (NBC): Dick Enberg and Bill Walsh

Scoring summary
Q2		CU	Jim Harper 22-yard field goal	CU 3–0
Q2	7:32	ND	Ricky Watters 2-yard run (PAT blocked)	ND 6–3
Q3		ND	Craig Hentrich 24-yard field goal	ND 9–3
Q3		CU	Eric Bieniemy 1-yard run (Harper kick)	'CU 10–9

Notre Dame lost a heartbreaker to top-ranked Colorado in the Orange Bowl, 10–9. The Irish were undone by three third-quarter turnovers and a controversial penalty flag that negated a late punt return touchdown by Ismail. Colorado would go on to win a share of the national championship.

== Roster ==
1990 Notre Dame Fighting Irish football team roster
Players
Coaches
Offense

Pos.	#	Name	Class
FB	6	Jerome Bettis	Fr
RB	40	Tony Brooks	Jr
TE	86	Derek Brown	Jr
RB	5	Rodney Culver	Jr
WR	87	Lake Dawson	Fr
WR	25	Raghib Ismail	Sr
WR	10	Adrian Jarrell	So
OT	65	Lindsay Knapp	Jr
RB	4	Dorsey Levens	So
TE	80	Oscar McBride	Fr
OT	76	Gene McGuire	Jr
QB	3	Rick Mirer	So
G	52	Tim Ryan	Sr
WR	12	Ricky Watters	Sr

Defense

Pos.	#	Name	Class
S	9	Jeff Burris	Fr
CB	32	Willie Clark	Fr
CB	29	John Covington	Fr
DT	93	Bob Dahl	Sr
LB	31	Demetrius DuBose	So
LB	42	Michael Stonebreaker	Jr
CB	1	Todd Lyght	Sr
LB	89	Karmeeleyah McGill	So
LB	46	Brian Ratigan	So
CB	21	Rod Smith	Jr
DT	97	Bryant Young	Fr
DT	50	Chris Zorich	Sr

Special teams

Pos.	#	Name	Class
K, P	28	Craig Hentrich	So
P	16	Jim Sexton	Sr

Head coach

- Lou Holtz

Coordinators/assistant coaches

- Gary Darnell (Defensive coordinator)
- Skip Holtz (Wide receivers)
- Robert McFarland (Graduate assistant)

Legend

- (C) Team captain
- (S) Suspended
- (I) Ineligible
- Injured
- Redshirt

Roster

== Awards and honors ==
Junior flanker Rocket Ismail received numerous awards and honors:

- Finished second in voting for the Heisman Trophy.
- Received the Walter Camp Award
- Named The Sporting News Player of the Year
- Voted by teammates at Notre Dame's most valuable player
- Consensus first-team All-America, with first-team honors from Associated Press (AP), Walter Camp Football Foundation (WCFF), Football Writers Association of America (FWAA), American Football Coaches Association (AFCA), Football News (FN)

Senior defensive tackle Chris Zorich also received numerous awards and honors:

- Won the Lombardi Award
- Consensus first-team All-Americam with first-team honors from AP, WCFF, FWAA, AFCA, and FN
- Athlon defensive player of the year
- Outland Trophy semifinalist
- Named Notre Dame Lineman of the Year
- Orange Bowl MVP
- Invited to play in Hula Bowl and Japan Bowl

Senior inside linebacker Michael Stonebreaker was a consensus first-team All-American with first-team honors from AP, WCFF, FWAA, and AFCA. He was also a finalist (finished third) for the Butkus Award and was invited to play in the Hula Bowl and Japan Bowl.

Senior cornerback Todd Lyght received first-team All-America honors from the WCFF and AFCA. He was also a semifinalist for the Jim Thorpe Award and was invited to play in the Hula Bowl and Japan Bowl.

Senior center Mike Heldt received first-team All-America honors from FN and was invited to play in the Hula Bowl.

Sophomore kicker/punter Craig Hentrich received Chevrolet MVP designations for the Miami and USC games. He set a Notre Dame single-game record with five field goals in six attempts versus Miami.

== 1991 NFL draft ==
- Despite being drafted by the Los Angeles Raiders, the Toronto Argonauts of the Canadian Football League signed Raghib Ismail to a four-year contract worth 18 million dollars in April 1991. The Ismail signing included four million dollars upfront.
