= 1990 Indiana Hoosiers football team =

American college football season

1990 Indiana Hoosiers football

Peach Bowl, L 23–27 vs. Auburn
- Conference: Big Ten Conference
- Record: 6–5–1 (3–4–1 Big Ten)
- Head coach: Bill Mallory (7th season)
- Defensive coordinator: Joe Novak (7th season)
- MVP: Mike Dumas
- Captains: Mike Dumas; Cal Miller
- Home stadium: Memorial Stadium

1990 Big Ten Conference football standings
	Conf.					Overall
Team	W		L		T	W		L		T
No. 7 Michigan +	6	–	2	–	0	9	–	3	–	0
No. 16 Michigan State +	6	–	2	–	0	8	–	3	–	1
No. 25 Illinois +	6	–	2	–	0	8	–	4	–	0
No. 18 Iowa +	6	–	2	–	0	8	–	4	–	0
Ohio State	5	–	2	–	1	7	–	4	–	1
Minnesota	5	–	3	–	0	6	–	5	–	0
Indiana	3	–	4	–	1	6	–	5	–	1
Northwestern	1	–	7	–	0	2	–	9	–	0
Purdue	1	–	7	–	0	2	–	9	–	0
Wisconsin	0	–	8	–	0	1	–	10	–	0
+ – Conference co-champions; Rankings from AP Poll

The 1990 Indiana Hoosiers football team represented Indiana University Bloomington as a member of the Big Ten Conference during the 1990 NCAA Division I-A football season. Led by seventh-year head coach Bill Mallory, the Hoosiers compiled an overall record of 6–5–1 with a mark of 3–4–1 in conference play, placing seventh the Big Ten. Indiana was invited to the Peach Bowl, where they lost to Auburn, 27–23. The team played home games at Memorial Stadium in Bloomington, Indiana.

== Schedule ==
Date	Time	Opponent	Rank	Site	TV	Result	Attendance	Source
September 15		Kentucky*		Commonwealth Stadium; Lexington, KY (rivalry)		W 45–24	58,150	
September 22	1:00 pm	Missouri*		Memorial Stadium; Bloomington, IN		W 58–7	45,228	
September 29		Eastern Michigan*		Memorial Stadium; Bloomington, IN		W 37–6	40,043	
October 6	11:30 am	at Northwestern		Dyche Stadium; Evanston, IL		W 42–0	30,447	
October 13	12:30 pm	Ohio State^{†}	No. 22	Memorial Stadium; Bloomington, IN	ESPN	T 27–27	52,080	
October 20	1:05 pm	at Minnesota	No. 20	Hubert H. Humphrey Metrodome; Minneapolis, MN		L 0–12	38,227	
October 27	12:30 pm	No. 20 Michigan		Memorial Stadium; Bloomington, IN	ESPN	L 19–45	51,948	
November 3	12:30 pm	at Michigan State		Spartan Stadium; East Lansing, MI (rivalry)	ESPN	L 20–45	74,261	
November 10	12:00 pm	Wisconsin		Memorial Stadium; Bloomington, IN		W 20–7	45,093	
November 17	12:30 pm	No. 22 Illinois		Memorial Stadium; Bloomington, IN (rivalry)		L 10–24	44,639	
November 24	1:00 pm	at Purdue		Ross–Ade Stadium; West Lafayette, IN (Old Oaken Bucket)		W 28–14	50,519–51,393	
December 29	11:30 am	vs. Auburn		Atlanta–Fulton County Stadium; Atlanta, GA (Peach Bowl)	ABC	L 23–27	38,962	
*Non-conference game; ^{†}Homecoming; Rankings from AP Poll released prior to the game

== Personnel ==
1990 Indiana Hoosiers football team roster
Players
Coaches
Offense

Pos.	#	Name	Class
RB	26	Vaughn Dunbar	Jr
QB	12	Trent Green	So
RB		Ernie Thompson
WR		Rob Turner

Defense

Pos.	#	Name	Class
S		Mike Dumas
DT		Nolan Harrison
LB		Troy Mason

Special teams

Pos.	#	Name	Class
K		Scott Bonnell
K		Matt Pruslecki
P		Macky Smith

Head coach

- Bill Mallory

Coordinators/assistant coaches

Legend

- (C) Team captain
- (S) Suspended
- (I) Ineligible
- Injured
- Redshirt

== 1991 NFL draftees ==
Round	Pick	Player	Position	NFL team
2	28	Mike Dumas	Safety	Houston Oilers
6	146	Nolan Harrison	Defensive tackle	Los Angeles Raiders
12	312	Ernie Thompson	Running back	Los Angeles Raiders
