= 1990 Purdue Boilermakers football team =

American college football season

1990 Purdue Boilermakers football
- Conference: Big Ten Conference
- Record: 2–9 (1–7 Big Ten)
- Head coach: Fred Akers (4th season)
- Offensive coordinator: Fred Jackson (1st season)
- Defensive coordinator: Phil Bennett (4th season)
- Base defense: 4–3
- MVP: Steve Jackson
- Captains: Steve Jackson; Larry Taylor
- Home stadium: Ross–Ade Stadium

1990 Big Ten Conference football standings
	Conf.					Overall
Team	W		L		T	W		L		T
No. 7 Michigan +	6	–	2	–	0	9	–	3	–	0
No. 16 Michigan State +	6	–	2	–	0	8	–	3	–	1
No. 25 Illinois +	6	–	2	–	0	8	–	4	–	0
No. 18 Iowa +	6	–	2	–	0	8	–	4	–	0
Ohio State	5	–	2	–	1	7	–	4	–	1
Minnesota	5	–	3	–	0	6	–	5	–	0
Indiana	3	–	4	–	1	6	–	5	–	1
Northwestern	1	–	7	–	0	2	–	9	–	0
Purdue	1	–	7	–	0	2	–	9	–	0
Wisconsin	0	–	8	–	0	1	–	10	–	0
+ – Conference co-champions; Rankings from AP Poll

The 1990 Purdue Boilermakers football team represented Purdue University as a member of the Big Ten Conference during the 1990 NCAA Division I-A football season. Led by Fred Akers in his fourth and final season as head coach, the Boilermakers compiled an overall record of 2–9 with a mark of 1–7 in conference play, tying for eighth place the Big Ten. Purdue suffered its sixth consecutive losing season. The team played home games at Ross–Ade Stadium in West Lafayette, Indiana.

== Schedule ==
Date	Time	Opponent	Site	TV	Result	Attendance	Source
September 15	12:30 pm	No. 22 Washington*	Ross–Ade Stadium; West Lafayette, IN		L 14–20	33,113	
September 22	1:00 pm	Indiana State*	Ross–Ade Stadium; West Lafayette, IN		W 41–13	42,387	
September 29	12:00 pm	at No. 1 Notre Dame*	Notre Dame Stadium; Notre Dame, IN (rivalry)	SCA	L 11–37	59,075	
October 6	1:00 pm	Minnesota	Ross–Ade Stadium; West Lafayette, IN		L 7–19	34,123	
October 13	1:00 pm	at No. 11 Illinois	Memorial Stadium; Champaign, IL (rivalry)		L 0–34	60,604	
October 20	1:00 pm	Ohio State^{†}	Ross–Ade Stadium; West Lafayette, IN		L 2–42	57,031	
October 27	12:00 pm	at Michigan State	Spartan Stadium; East Lansing, MI		L 33–55	77,343	
November 3	1:00 pm	No. 3 Michigan	Ross–Ade Stadium; West Lafayette, IN		L 13–38	38,750	
November 10	2:00 pm	at Northwestern	Dyche Stadium; Evanston, IL		W 33–13	25,026	
November 17	3:30 pm	at No. 13 Iowa	Kinnick Stadium; Iowa City, IA	ABC	L 9–38	67,836	
November 24	1:00 pm	Indiana	Ross–Ade Stadium; West Lafayette, IN (Old Oaken Bucket)		L 14–28	50,519–51,393	
*Non-conference game; ^{†}Homecoming; Rankings from AP Poll released prior to the game; All times are in Eastern time; Source:

== Game summaries ==
=== At Notre Dame ===
- Eric Hunter 21/37, 354 yards

=== Ohio State ===
- Scott Hoffman 31/54, 317 yards

== Personnel ==
1990 Purdue Boilermakers football team roster
Players
Coaches
Offense

Pos.	#	Name	Class
FB	38	Mike Doctor	Jr
WR		Ernest Calloway
G		Jason Cegleski
OT		Denny Chronopoulos
RB		Earl Coleman
RB		Arlee Conners
OT		Scott Conover
WR		Rodney Dennis
C		Bob Dressel
WR		Jeff Hill
QB		Scott Hoffman
QB		Eric Hunter
WR		Steve Letnich
WR		Danny Lounsbury
WR		Curtis McManus
RB		Galen Morrow
RB		John Oglesby
WR		Jermaine Ross
G		Larry Taylor (C)
RB		Tony Vinson
WR		Dunyasha Yetts
WR		Jimmy Young

Defense

Pos.	#	Name	Class
ILB		Eric Beatty
DT		Kris Burns
CB		Steve Jackson (C)
S		Terry Johnson
DE		Frank Kmet
S		Nat Martin
OLB		Tom McNeil
DE		Peyton Minter
CB		Jarrett Scales
OLB		Jim Schwantz
DT		Jeff Zgonina

Special teams

Pos.	#	Name	Class
P		Eric Bruun
K		Larry Sullivan
K		Steve Wambold

Head coach

- Fred Akers

Coordinators/assistant coaches

- Dan Lounsbury (RB/WR)
- Bill Michael (TE/OT)

Legend

- (C) Team captain
- (S) Suspended
- (I) Ineligible
- Injured
- Redshirt
