= Bill Mallory =

American football player and coach (1935–2018)

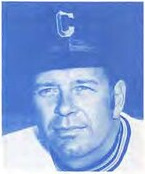
- Mallory in 1976

Biographical details
- Born: May 30, 1935; Sandusky, Ohio, U.S.
- Died: May 25, 2018 (aged 82); Bloomington, Indiana, U.S.

Playing career
- 1955–1956: Miami (OH)
- Position: End

Coaching career (HC unless noted)
- 1960–1964: Bowling Green (assistant)
- 1965: Yale (assistant)
- 1966–1968: Ohio State (assistant)
- 1969–1973: Miami (OH)
- 1974–1978: Colorado
- 1980–1983: Northern Illinois
- 1984–1996: Indiana

Head coaching record
- Overall: 168–129–4
- Bowls: 4–6

Accomplishments and honors

Championships
- 2 MAC (1973, 1983); 1 Big Eight (1976)

Awards
- 2× MAC Coach of the Year (1973, 1983); 2× Big Ten Coach of the Year (1986–1987)

William Guy Mallory (May 30, 1935 – May 25, 2018) was an American college football player and coach. He served as the head football coach at Miami University in Oxford, Ohio from 1969 to 1973, the University of Colorado at Boulder from 1974 to 1978, Northern Illinois University from 1980 to 1983, and Indiana University Bloomington from 1984 to 1996, compiling a career head coaching record of 168–129–4.

== Playing career ==
Mallory played football at Miami University for coaches Ara Parseghian and John Pont.

== Coaching career ==
Mallory is the Indiana Hoosiers' winningest football coach, having compiled a 69–77–3 record. Before taking over the head coaching reins at Indiana in 1984, Mallory coached three other schools to national prominence. While compiling a 168–129–4 career record, Mallory became one of only a handful of coaches in history to guide three different programs to top 20 finishes in national polls. In 1987, Mallory became the first coach to be awarded back-to-back Big Ten coach-of-the-year honors. While at Indiana, Mallory led the Hoosiers to six bowl games including victories in the 1988 Liberty Bowl, and the 1991 Copper Bowl. He also led IU to a top 20 ranking in 1987 and 1988.

Early in his coaching career, Mallory served as assistant to Woody Hayes at Ohio State University, Carmen Cozza at Yale University and Doyt Perry at Bowling Green State University.

Mallory is a member of Miami University's Cradle of Coaches. He is also a member of the Athletic Halls of Fame at Miami University and Indiana University, the Mid-American Conference, the Indiana Football Hall of Fame and the Phi Kappa Tau Hall of Fame.

Mallory was the 15th head college football coach for the Northern Illinois University Huskies located in DeKalb, Illinois and he held that position for four seasons, from 1980 until 1983. He coached the Huskies to victory in the 1983 California Bowl, the school's first major bowl game appearance. Mallory's career coaching record at Northern Illinois was 25 wins, 19 losses, and 0 ties. This ranks him sixth at Northern Illinois in total wins and seventh at NIU in winning percentage.

== Death ==
Mallory died in Bloomington, Indiana, on May 25, 2018, at the age of 82.

== Head coaching record ==
Year	Team	Overall	Conference	Standing	Bowl/playoffs	Coaches^{#}	AP^{°}
Miami Redskins (Mid-American Conference) (1969–1973)
1969	Miami	7–3	3–3	T–3rd			
1970	Miami	7–3	3–2	T–2nd			
1971	Miami	7–3	2–3	T–3rd			
1972	Miami	7–3	2–3	T–4th			
1973	Miami	11–0	5–0	1st	W Tangerine	17	15
Miami:		39–12	15–11				
Colorado Buffaloes (Big Eight Conference) (1974–1978)
1974	Colorado	5–6	3–4	5th			
1975	Colorado	9–3	5–2	3rd	L Astro-Bluebonnet		16
1976	Colorado	8–4	5–2	T–1st	L Orange	16	16
1977	Colorado	7–3–1	3–3–1	4th			
1978	Colorado	6–5	2–5	7th			
Colorado:		35–21–1	18–16–1				
Northern Illinois Huskies (Mid-American Conference) (1980–1983)
1980	Northern Illinois	7–4	4–3	T–3rd			
1981	Northern Illinois	3–8	2–7	9th			
1982	Northern Illinois	5–5	5–4	T–5th			
1983	Northern Illinois	10–2	8–1	1st	W California		
Northern Illinois:		25–19	19–15				
Indiana Hoosiers (Big Ten Conference) (1984–1996)
1984	Indiana	0–11	0–9	10th			
1985	Indiana	4–7	1–7	T–9th			
1986	Indiana	6–6	3–5	T–6th	L All-American		
1987	Indiana	8–4	6–2	T–2nd	L Peach	20	
1988	Indiana	8–3–1	5–3	5th	W Liberty	19	20
1989	Indiana	5–6	3–5	T–6th			
1990	Indiana	6–5–1	3–4–1	7th	L Peach		
1991	Indiana	7–4–1	5–3	T–3rd	W Copper		
1992	Indiana	5–6	3–5	T–6th			
1993	Indiana	8–4	5–3	T–4th	L Independence		
1994	Indiana	6–5	3–5	T–8th			
1995	Indiana	2–9	0–8	11th			
1996	Indiana	3–8	1–7	T–9th			
Indiana:		69–77–3	39–65–1				
Total:		168–129–4					
National championship Conference title Conference division title or championship game berth
^{#}Rankings from final Coaches Poll.; ^{°}Rankings from final AP Poll.
