= Tony Stewart (Canadian football) =

American gridiron football player (born 1968)

Profile
- Position: Running back

Personal information
- Born: January 30, 1968 (age 58); Chester, South Carolina, U.S.
- Listed height: 6 ft 1 in (1.85 m)
- Listed weight: 204 lb (93 kg)

Career information
- College: University of Iowa
- NFL draft: 1991: 11th round, 297th overall pick

Career history
- 1993–95: Calgary Stampeders
- 1996: Hamilton Tiger-Cats

Awards and highlights
- Union Hall Of Fame

Tony Stewart (born January 30, 1968) is a former running back in the Canadian Football League (CFL).

A graduate of University of Iowa, Stewart played three seasons with the Calgary Stampeders. His best season was 1994 when he rushed for 1120 yards and scored 19 touchdowns. He finished his career with the Hamilton Tiger-Cats.
