= 1990 Minnesota Golden Gophers football team =

American college football season

1990 Minnesota Golden Gophers football
- Conference: Big Ten Conference
- Record: 6–5 (5–3 Big Ten)
- Head coach: John Gutekunst (5th season)
- Defensive coordinator: Tom Gadd (1st season)
- Captains: Frank Jackson; Mike Sunvold
- Home stadium: Hubert H. Humphrey Metrodome

1990 Big Ten Conference football standings
	Conf.					Overall
Team	W		L		T	W		L		T
No. 7 Michigan +	6	–	2	–	0	9	–	3	–	0
No. 16 Michigan State +	6	–	2	–	0	8	–	3	–	1
No. 25 Illinois +	6	–	2	–	0	8	–	4	–	0
No. 18 Iowa +	6	–	2	–	0	8	–	4	–	0
Ohio State	5	–	2	–	1	7	–	4	–	1
Minnesota	5	–	3	–	0	6	–	5	–	0
Indiana	3	–	4	–	1	6	–	5	–	1
Northwestern	1	–	7	–	0	2	–	9	–	0
Purdue	1	–	7	–	0	2	–	9	–	0
Wisconsin	0	–	8	–	0	1	–	10	–	0
+ – Conference co-champions; Rankings from AP Poll

The 1990 Minnesota Golden Gophers football team represented the University of Minnesota in the 1990 NCAA Division I-A football season. In their fifth year under head coach John Gutekunst, the Golden Gophers compiled a 6–5 record and were outscored by their opponents by a combined total of 281 to 224.

Center Chris Thome was named All-Big Ten first team. Offensive tackle Mike Sunvold and defensive back Sean Lumpkin were named All-Big Ten second team. Punter Brent Herbel was named Academic All-American. Quarterback Scott Schaffner and linebacker Joel Staats were named Academic All-Big Ten.

Mike Sunvold was awarded the Bronko Nagurski Award and Carl Eller Award. Quarterback Marquel Fleetwood was awarded the Bruce Smith Award. Cornerback Kenneth Sebree was awarded the Bobby Bell Award. Cornerback Frank Jackson was awarded the Butch Nash Award. Running back Jim King was awarded the Paul Giel Award.

Total attendance for the season was 243,511, which averaged out to 40,585 per game. The season high for attendance was against the Iowa.

== Schedule ==
Date	Time	Opponent	Site	Result	Attendance	Source
September 8	7:00 pm	Utah*	Hubert H. Humphrey Metrodome; Minneapolis, MN	L 29–35	32,229	
September 15	1:30 pm	Iowa State*	Hubert H. Humphrey Metrodome; Minneapolis, MN	W 20–16	37,108	
September 22	1:30 pm	at No. 8 Nebraska*	Memorial Stadium; Lincoln, NE	L 0–56	76,354	
October 6	1:00 pm	at Purdue	Ross–Ade Stadium; West Lafayette, IN	W 19–7	34,123	
October 13	1:30 pm	Northwestern^{†}	Hubert H. Humphrey Metrodome; Minneapolis, MN	W 35–25	32,522	
October 20	1:30 pm	No. 20 Indiana	Hubert H. Humphrey Metrodome; Minneapolis, MN	W 12–0	38,227	
October 27	12:30 pm	at Ohio State	Ohio Stadium; Columbus, OH	L 23–52	89,533	
November 3	1:00 pm	at Wisconsin	Camp Randall Stadium; Madison, WI (rivalry)	W 21–3	51,189	
November 10	1:30 pm	No. 24 Michigan State	Hubert H. Humphrey Metrodome; Minneapolis, MN	L 16–28	38,731	
November 17	12:00 pm	at No. 16 Michigan	Michigan Stadium; Ann Arbor, MI (Little Brown Jug)	L 18–35	102,112	
November 24	1:30 pm	No. 13 Iowa	Hubert H. Humphrey Metrodome; Minneapolis, MN (rivalry)	W 31–24	64,694	
*Non-conference game; ^{†}Homecoming; Rankings from AP Poll released prior to the game; All times are in Central time

== Roster ==
1990 Minnesota Golden Gophers football team roster
Players			Coaches
Offense: Pos. / # / Name / Class	Defense: Pos. / # / Name / Class; DB / 26 / Sean Lumpkin / Jr	Special teams: Pos. / # / Name / Class	Head coach: John Gutekunst; Coordinators/assistant coaches Legend: (C) Team captain; (S) Suspended; (I) Ineligible; Injured; Redshirt
