= Brian Ratigan =

American football player (born 1970)

No. 52
- Position: Linebacker

Personal information
- Born: December 27, 1970 (age 55); Council Bluffs, Iowa, U.S.
- Listed height: 6 ft 4 in (1.93 m)
- Listed weight: 241 lb (109 kg)

Career information
- High school: Saint Albert (Council Bluffs)
- College: Notre Dame
- NFL draft: 1993: undrafted

Career history
- Indianapolis Colts (1993–1995)
- Stats at Pro Football Reference

Brian Ratigan (born December 27, 1970) is an American former professional football player who was a linebacker for the Indianapolis Colts of the National Football League (NFL) in 1994. He played college football for the Notre Dame Fighting Irish.
