= 1990 Ohio State Buckeyes football team =

American college football season

1990 Ohio State Buckeyes football

Liberty Bowl, L 11-23 vs. Air Force
- Conference: Big Ten Conference
- Record: 7–4–1 (5–2–1 Big Ten)
- Head coach: John Cooper (3rd season)
- Offensive coordinator: Jim Colletto (3rd season)
- Offensive scheme: Singleback
- Defensive coordinator: Bill Young (3rd season)
- Base defense: 3–4
- MVP: Jeff Graham
- Captains: Jeff Graham; Dan Beatty; Bo Pelini; Vinnie Clark; Greg Frey
- Home stadium: Ohio Stadium

1990 Big Ten Conference football standings
	Conf.					Overall
Team	W		L		T	W		L		T
No. 7 Michigan +	6	–	2	–	0	9	–	3	–	0
No. 16 Michigan State +	6	–	2	–	0	8	–	3	–	1
No. 25 Illinois +	6	–	2	–	0	8	–	4	–	0
No. 18 Iowa +	6	–	2	–	0	8	–	4	–	0
Ohio State	5	–	2	–	1	7	–	4	–	1
Minnesota	5	–	3	–	0	6	–	5	–	0
Indiana	3	–	4	–	1	6	–	5	–	1
Northwestern	1	–	7	–	0	2	–	9	–	0
Purdue	1	–	7	–	0	2	–	9	–	0
Wisconsin	0	–	8	–	0	1	–	10	–	0
+ – Conference co-champions; Rankings from AP Poll

The 1990 Ohio State Buckeyes football team was an American football team that represented the Ohio State University as a member of the Big Ten Conference during the 1990 NCAA Division I-A football season. In their third year under head coach John Cooper, the Buckeyes compiled a 7–4–1 record (5–2–1 in conference games), finished in fifth place in the Big Ten, and outscored opponents by a total of 338 to 197. Against ranked opponents, they tied with No. 22 Indiana and lost to No. 18 USC, No. 13 Illinois, and No. 15 Michigan. They concluded the season with a loss to unranked Air Force in the 1990 Liberty Bowl. The Buckeyes were not ranked in the final AP poll.

The Buckeyes gained an average of 177.7 rushing yards and 181.9 passing yards per game. On defense, they held opponents to 125.7 rushing yards and 164.9 passing yards per game. The team's statistical leaders included quarterback Greg Frey (1,952 passing yards, 51.8% completion percentage), running back Robert Smith (1,064 rushing yards, 6.5 yards per carry), and wide receiver Jeff Graham (39 receptions for 760 yards). Graham, center Dan Beatty, and linebacker Steve Tovar received first-team honors on the 1990 All-Big Ten Conference football team.

The team played its home games at Ohio Stadium in Columbus, Ohio.

== Schedule ==
Date	Time	Opponent	Rank	Site	TV	Result	Attendance	Source
September 8	3:30 p.m.	Texas Tech*	No. 18	Ohio Stadium; Columbus, OH	ABC	W 17–10	88,707	
September 15	12:00 p.m.	at Boston College*	No. 17	Alumni Stadium; Chestnut Hill, MA	JPS	W 31–10	32,432	
September 29	3:30 p.m.	No. 18 USC*	No. 15	Ohio Stadium; Columbus, OH	ABC	L 26–35	89,422	
October 6	3:30 p.m.	No. 13 Illinois	No. 20	Ohio Stadium; Columbus, OH (Illibuck)	ABC	L 20–31	89,404	
October 13	12:30 p.m.	at No. 22 Indiana		Memorial Stadium; Bloomington, IN	ESPN	T 27–27	52,080	
October 20	2:00 p.m.	at Purdue		Ross–Ade Stadium; West Lafayette, IN		W 42–2	57,031	
October 27	1:30 p.m.	Minnesota		Ohio Stadium; Columbus, OH		W 52–23	89,533	
November 3	1:30 p.m.	Northwestern		Ohio Stadium; Columbus, OH		W 48–7	89,177	
November 10	12:00 p.m.	at No. 6 Iowa		Kinnick Stadium; Iowa City, IA	ABC	W 27–26	70,033	
November 17	2:00 p.m.	at Wisconsin	No. 21	Camp Randall Stadium; Madison, WI		W 35–10	41,403	
November 24	12:00 p.m.	No. 15 Michigan	No. 19	Ohio Stadium; Columbus, OH (rivalry)	ABC	L 13–16	90,054	
December 27	7:00 p.m.	vs. Air Force*	No. 24	Liberty Bowl Memorial Stadium; Memphis, TN (Liberty Bowl)	ESPN	L 11–23	39,262	
*Non-conference game; Rankings from AP Poll released prior to the game; All times are in Eastern time

== Game summaries ==
=== Texas Tech ===
Team	1	2	3	4	Total
Texas Tech	0	3	7	0	10
• Ohio St	0	0	10	7	17

- Date: September 8
- Location: Ohio Stadium, Columbus, Ohio

Scoring summary
Q2	TTU	Elliott 37 yard field goal	TTU 3–0
Q3	OHST	T. Williams 32 yard field goal	Tie 3–3
Q3	TTU	Lynn 52 yard pass from Gill (Elliott kick)	TTU 10–3
Q3	OHST	Smith 2 yard run (T. Williams kick)	Tie 10–10
Q4	OHST	J. Graham 50 yard punt return (T. Williams kick)	OHST 17–10

=== At Iowa ===
Ohio State Buckeyes (5–2–1) at #6 Iowa Hawkeyes (7–1)

Quarter	1	2	3	4	Total
Ohio St	0	14	0	13	27
Iowa	7	10	3	6	26

at Kinnick Stadium, Iowa City, Iowa

- Date: November 10
- Game time: 11:10 a.m. CST
- Game weather: Partly cloudy, 55 °F (13 °C)
- Game attendance: 70,033
- Referee: Ron Winter
- TV announcers (ABC): Brent Musburger & Dick Vermeil

Game information

First quarter

- IOWA – Matt Rodgers 3-yard run (Jeff Skillett kick), 11:12. Iowa 7–0. Drive: 8 plays, 80 yards, 3:46.

Second quarter

- OSU – Greg Frey 1-yard run (Tim Williams kick), 14:58. Tie 7–7. Drive: 9 plays, 59 yards, 3:35.
- IOWA – Jeff Skillett 34-yard field goal, 9:04. Iowa 10–7. Drive: 12 plays, 50 yards, 5:48.
- IOWA – Lew Montgomery 1-yard run (Jeff Skillett kick), 2:17. Iowa 17–7. Drive: 9 plays, 46 yards, 3:54.
- OSU – Jeff Graham 48-yard pass from Greg Frey (Tim Williams kick), 0:00. Iowa 17–14. Drive: 4 plays, 60 yards, 0:43.

Third quarter

- IOWA – Jeff Skillett 37-yard field goal, 0:23. Iowa 20–14. Drive: 8 plays, 56 yards, 2:57.

Fourth quarter

- IOWA – Lew Montgomery 1-yard run (run failed), 11:00. Iowa 26–14. Drive: 11 plays, 80 yards, 3:41.
- OSU – Bobby Olive 21-yard pass from Greg Frey (Tim Williams kick), 6:34. Iowa 26–21. Drive: 5 plays, 24 yards, 0:48.
- OSU – Bobby Olive 3-yard pass from Greg Frey (run failed), 0:01. Ohio St 27–26. Drive: 6 plays, 48 yards, 0:57.

Top passers

- OSU – Glenn Frey – 14/37, 223 yards, 3 TD, INT
- IOWA – Matt Rodgers – 13/21, 137 yards, INT

Top rushers

- OSU – Robert Smith – 13 rushes, 52 yards
- IOWA – Nick Bell – 16 rushes, 77 yards

Top receivers

- OSU – Jeff Graham – 5 receptions, 105 yards, TD
- IOWA – Michael Titley – 4 receptions, 79 yards

== Personnel ==
1990 Ohio State Buckeyes football team roster
Players
Coaches
Offense

Pos.	#	Name	Class
WR	83	Allen DeGraffenreid	So
QB		Greg Frey
WR		Jeff Graham
OT	67	Alan Kline	Fr
WR	8	Bobby Olive
TE	85	Cedric Saunders	Fr
RB		Robert Smith

Defense

Pos.	#	Name	Class

Special teams

Pos.	#	Name	Class
K		Tim Williams

Head coach

- John Cooper
  (3rd Year)

Coordinators/assistant coaches

- Jim Colletto
  Assistant Head Coach/Offensive Coordinator, Tackles and Tight Ends (3rd Year)
- Bill Young
  Defensive Coordinator (3rd Year)
- Gary Blackney
  Inside Linebackers (7th Year)
- Tony Caviglia
  Volunteer Assistant (2nd Year)
- Ron Hudson
  Quarterbacks (3rd Year)
- Gene Huey
  Wide Receivers (3rd Year)
- Steve Pederson
  Recruiting Coordinator (3rd Year)
- Fred Pagac
  Outside Linebackers (9th Year)
- Bob Palcic
  Guards and Centers, Special Teams Coordinator (5th Year)
- Bobby Turner
  Running Backs (2nd Year)
- Dave Kennedy
  Strength and Conditioning Coach (2nd Year)
- Ron Zook
  Defensive Backs (3rd Year)

Legend

- (C) Team captain
- (S) Suspended
- (I) Ineligible
- Injured
- Redshirt

Roster
Last update: 2016-Dec-02

== Awards and honors ==
- Robert Smith, Big Ten Freshman of the Year

== 1991 NFL draftees ==
Player	Round	Pick	Position	NFL club
Vinnie Clark	1	19	Defensive back	Green Bay Packers
Jeff Graham	2	46	Wide receiver	Pittsburgh Steelers
Bobby Olive	11	300	Wide receiver	Kansas City Chiefs
