= 1990 Illinois Fighting Illini football team =

American college football season

1990 Illinois Fighting Illini football

Big Ten co-champion

Hall of Fame Bowl, L 0–30 vs. Clemson
- Conference: Big Ten Conference

Ranking
- Coaches: No. 24
- AP: No. 25
- Record: 8–4 (6–2 Big Ten)
- Head coach: John Mackovic (3rd season)
- Offensive coordinator: Gene Dahlquist (3rd season)
- Defensive coordinator: Lou Tepper (3rd season)
- MVP: Howard Griffith
- Captains: Curtis Lovelace; Howard Griffith; Moe Gardner; Darrick Brownlow
- Home stadium: Memorial Stadium

1990 Big Ten Conference football standings
	Conf.					Overall
Team	W		L		T	W		L		T
No. 7 Michigan +	6	–	2	–	0	9	–	3	–	0
No. 16 Michigan State +	6	–	2	–	0	8	–	3	–	1
No. 25 Illinois +	6	–	2	–	0	8	–	4	–	0
No. 18 Iowa +	6	–	2	–	0	8	–	4	–	0
Ohio State	5	–	2	–	1	7	–	4	–	1
Minnesota	5	–	3	–	0	6	–	5	–	0
Indiana	3	–	4	–	1	6	–	5	–	1
Northwestern	1	–	7	–	0	2	–	9	–	0
Purdue	1	–	7	–	0	2	–	9	–	0
Wisconsin	0	–	8	–	0	1	–	10	–	0
+ – Conference co-champions; Rankings from AP Poll

The 1990 Illinois Fighting Illini football team was an American football team that represented the University of Illinois at Urbana-Champaign as a member of the Big Ten Conference during the 1990 NCAA Division I-A football season. In their third year under head coach John Mackovic, the Illini compiled an 8–4 record (6–2 in conference games), finished in a four-way tie for first place in the Big Ten, and outscored opponents by a total of 293 to 216. They concluded the season in the 1991 Hall of Fame Bowl, losing to Clemson. Ranked No. 16 in the AP poll at the end of the regular season, they dropped to No. 25 in the final poll issued after the bowl games.

Quarterback Jason Verduzco led the Big Ten with 213 completions, a 64.5% completion percentage, and 2,446 passing yards. Other statistical leaders included fullback Howard Griffith with 1,056 rushing yards and 90 points scored, and wide receiver Shawn Wax with 54 receptions for 863 yards.

Nose guard Moe Gardner was a consensus pick on the 1990 All-American team, and linebacker Darrick Brownlow received first-team honors from Football News (second-team from the AP and UPI). Five players received first-team honors on the 1990 All-Big Ten Conference football team: defensive linemen Gardner (AP-1, Coaches-1) and Mel Agee (AP-1, Coaches-1); linebacker Brownlow (AP-1, Coaches-1); receiver Shawn Wax (AP-1, Coaches-2); and center Curt Lovelace (AP-1).

== Schedule ==
Date	Time	Opponent	Rank	Site	TV	Result	Attendance	Source
September 8	8:00 pm	at Arizona*	No. 11	Arizona Stadium; Tucson, AZ		L 16–28	53,330	
September 15	2:30 pm	No. 9 Colorado*	No. 21	Memorial Stadium; Champaign, IL	ABC	W 23–22	64,351	
September 22	2:30 pm	Southern Illinois*	No. 15	Memorial Stadium; Champaign, IL		W 56–21	64,469	
October 6	2:30 pm	at No. 20 Ohio State	No. 13	Ohio Stadium; Columbus, OH (Illibuck)	ABC	W 31–20	89,404	
October 13	12:00 pm	Purdue	No. 11	Memorial Stadium; Champaign, IL (rivalry)		W 34–0	60,604	
October 20	2:30 pm	No. 24 Michigan State^{†}	No. 8	Memorial Stadium; Champaign, IL	ABC	W 15–13	70,398	
October 27	1:00 pm	at Wisconsin	No. 5	Camp Randall Stadium; Madison, WI		W 21–3	67,746	
November 3	2:30 pm	No. 13 Iowa	No. 5	Memorial Stadium; Champaign, IL	ABC	L 28–54	72,714	
November 10	11:00 am	at No. 19 Michigan	No. 17	Michigan Stadium; Ann Arbor, MI (rivalry)		L 17–22	105,343	
November 17	11:30 am	Indiana	No. 22	Memorial Stadium; Bloomington, IN (rivalry)		W 24–10	44,639	
November 24	1:00 pm	Northwestern	No. 22	Memorial Stadium; Champaign, IL (rivalry)		W 28–23	32,383	
January 1	12:00 pm	vs. No. 14 Clemson*	No. 16	Tampa Stadium; Tampa, FL (Hall of Fame Bowl)	NBC	L 0–30	63,154	
*Non-conference game; ^{†}Homecoming; Rankings from AP Poll released prior to the game; All times are in Central time; Source:

== Game summaries ==
=== Colorado ===
#9 Colorado at #21 Illinois

Team	1	2	3	4	Total
Buffaloes	7	10	2	3	22
• Fighting Illini	3	7	7	6	23

- Date: October 6
- Location: Memorial Stadium, Champaign, IL
- Game attendance: 64,351
- Television network: ABC

Scoring summary
Q1		ILL	Doug Higgins 29-yard field goal	ILL 3–0
Q1		COL	George Hemingway 2-yard run (Harper kick)	COL 7–3
Q2		COL	Harper 54-yard field goal	COL 10–3
Q2		COL	Michael Simmons 32-yard pass from Darian Hagan (Harper kick)	COL 17–3
Q2	0:28	ILL	Elbert Turner 8-yard pass from Jason Verduzco (Higgins kick)	COL 17–10
Q3	2:28	ILL	Shawn Wax 4-yard pass from Jason Verduzco (Higgins kick)	Tied 17–17
Q3		COL	Safety, Greg Biekert tackled Griffith in end zone	COL 19–17
Q4	12:44	COL	Harper 26-yard field goal	COL 22–17
Q4	1:18	ILL	Howard Griffith 1-yard run (conversion failed)	ILL 23–22

== Roster ==
1990 Illinois Fighting Illini football team roster
Players
Coaches
Offense

Pos.	#	Name	Class
RB	29	Howard Griffith	Sr
TE	82	Frank Hartley	Sr
OT	79	Brad Hopkins	So
C	69	Tim Simpson	Jr

Defense

Pos.	#	Name	Class
DT	96	Mel Agee	Sr
LB	48	Darrick Brownlow	Sr
DT	95	Moe Gardner	Sr
DB	33	Chris Green	Sr
DB	18	Henry Jones	Sr
DB	37	Steve Nelson	Sr

Special teams

Pos.	#	Name	Class

Head coach

- John Mackovic

Coordinators/assistant coaches

Legend

- (C) Team captain
- (S) Suspended
- (I) Ineligible
- Injured
- Redshirt

== Award winners ==
- Darrick Brownlow - linebacker (1st-team All-America pick by Football News; 1st-team all-Big Ten pick by AP)
- Moe Gardner - defensive lineman (consensus 1st-team All-American; 1st-team all-Big Ten pick by AP)
- Howard Griffith - fullback (2nd-team all-Big Ten pick by AP)
- Doug Higgins - placekicker (2nd-team all-Big Ten pick by AP)
- Henry Jones - defensive back (2nd-team all-Big Ten pick by AP)
- Marlon Primous - defensive back (2nd-team all-Big Ten pick by AP)
- Tim Simpson -offensive guard (2nd-team all-Big Ten pick by AP)
- Shawn Wax - receiver (2nd-team all-Big Ten pick by AP)
