= 1990 Michigan Wolverines football team =

American college football season

1990 Michigan Wolverines football

Big Ten co-champion Gator Bowl champion

Gator Bowl, W 35–3 vs. Ole Miss
- Conference: Big Ten Conference

Ranking
- Coaches: No. 8
- AP: No. 7
- Record: 9–3 (6–2 Big Ten)
- Head coach: Gary Moeller (1st season)
- Defensive coordinator: Lloyd Carr (4th season)
- MVP: Tripp Welborne
- Captains: Jarrod Bunch; John Milligan
- Home stadium: Michigan Stadium

1990 Big Ten Conference football standings
| | Conf. | | | | | Overall |
| Team | W | | L | | T | W | | L | | T |
|---|---|---|---|---|---|---|---|---|---|---|
| No. 7 Michigan + | 6 | – | 2 | – | 0 | 9 | – | 3 | – | 0 |
| No. 16 Michigan State + | 6 | – | 2 | – | 0 | 8 | – | 3 | – | 1 |
| No. 25 Illinois + | 6 | – | 2 | – | 0 | 8 | – | 4 | – | 0 |
| No. 18 Iowa + | 6 | – | 2 | – | 0 | 8 | – | 4 | – | 0 |
| Ohio State | 5 | – | 2 | – | 1 | 7 | – | 4 | – | 1 |
| Minnesota | 5 | – | 3 | – | 0 | 6 | – | 5 | – | 0 |
| Indiana | 3 | – | 4 | – | 1 | 6 | – | 5 | – | 1 |
| Northwestern | 1 | – | 7 | – | 0 | 2 | – | 9 | – | 0 |
| Purdue | 1 | – | 7 | – | 0 | 2 | – | 9 | – | 0 |
| Wisconsin | 0 | – | 8 | – | 0 | 1 | – | 10 | – | 0 |
+ – Conference co-champions; Rankings from AP Poll

The 1990 Michigan Wolverines football team was an American football team that represented the University of Michigan as a member of the Big Ten Conference during the 1990 NCAA Division I-A football season. In their first year under head coach Gary Moeller, the Wolverines compiled a 9–3 record (6–2 in conference games), outscored opponents by a total of 354 to 195, and finished in a four-way tie for the Big Ten championship. They defeated No. 15 Ole Miss in the Gator Bowl and were ranked No. 7 in the final AP poll and No. 8 in the final Coaches Poll.

The team's statistical leaders included quarterback Elvis Grbac with 1,615 passing yards and 17 touchdown passes, running back Jon Vaughn with 1,236 rushing yards, wide receiver Desmond Howard with 57 receptions for 858 yards, and placekicker J. D. Carlson with 95 points scored (42 extra points, 16 field goals). Defensive back Tripp Welborne won Michigan's most valuable player award and was a consensus first-team pick on the 1990 All-America college football team. Offensive tackle Greg Skrepenak and guard Dean Dingman also won first-team All-America honors.

The team played its home games at Michigan Stadium in Ann Arbor, Michigan.

== Schedule ==
| Date | Time | Opponent | Rank | Site | TV | Result | Attendance | Source |
|---|---|---|---|---|---|---|---|---|
| September 15 | 9:00 p.m. | at No. 1 Notre Dame* | No. 4 | Notre Dame Stadium; Notre Dame, IN (rivalry) | CBS | L 24–28 | 59,075 | |
| September 22 | 12:00 p.m. | UCLA* | No. 7 | Michigan Stadium; Ann Arbor, MI | ABC | W 38–15 | 104,992 | |
| September 29 | 1:00 p.m. | Maryland* | No. 6 | Michigan Stadium; Ann Arbor, MI | | W 45–17 | 102,894 | |
| October 6 | 1:00 p.m. | at Wisconsin | No. 3 | Camp Randall Stadium; Madison, WI | | W 41–3 | 64,359 | |
| October 13 | 3:30 p.m. | Michigan State | No. 1 | Michigan Stadium; Ann Arbor, MI (rivalry) | ABC | L 27–28 | 106,188 | |
| October 20 | 12:30 p.m. | No. 23 Iowa^{†} | No. 10 | Michigan Stadium; Ann Arbor, MI | ESPN | L 23–24 | 105,517 | |
| October 27 | 12:30 p.m. | at Indiana | No. 20 | Memorial Stadium; Bloomington, IN | ESPN | W 45–19 | 51,948 | |
| November 3 | 1:00 p.m. | at Purdue | No. 20 | Ross–Ade Stadium; West Lafayette, IN | | W 38–13 | 38,750 | |
| November 10 | 12:00 p.m. | No. 17 Illinois | No. 19 | Michigan Stadium; Ann Arbor, MI (rivalry) | | W 22–17 | 105,343 | |
| November 17 | 12:30 p.m. | Minnesota | No. 16 | Michigan Stadium; Ann Arbor, MI (Little Brown Jug) | ESPN | W 35–18 | 102,112 | |
| November 24 | 12:00 p.m. | at No. 19 Ohio State | No. 15 | Ohio Stadium; Columbus, OH (rivalry) | ABC | W 16–13 | 90,054 | |
| January 1, 1991 | 11:30 a.m. | vs. No. 15 Ole Miss* | No. 12 | Gator Bowl Stadium; Jacksonville, FL (Gator Bowl) | ESPN | W 35–3 | 68,297 | |
*Non-conference game; ^{†}Homecoming; Rankings from AP Poll released prior to the game; All times are in Eastern time; Source:

== Game summaries ==
=== At Notre Dame ===
#4 Michigan Wolverines (0–0) at #1 Notre Dame Fighting Irish (0–0)

| Quarter | 1 | 2 | 3 | 4 | Total |
|---|---|---|---|---|---|
| Michigan | 3 | 7 | 14 | 0 | 24 |
| Notre Dame | 14 | 0 | 0 | 14 | 28 |

at Notre Dame Stadium, South Bend, Indiana

- Date: September 15
- Game time: 8:05 p.m. EST
- Game attendance: 59,075
- Box Score

Game information

First quarter

- ND – Rick Mirer 2-yard run (Craig Hentrich kick), 11:28. Notre Dame 7–0.
- MICH – J.D. Carlson 38-yard field goal, 7:01. Notre Dame 7–3.
- ND – Reggie Brooks 2-yard run (Craig Hentrich kick), 1:59. Notre Dame 14–3.

Second quarter

- MICH – Desmond Howard 25-yard pass from Elvis Grbac (J.D. Carlson kick), 3:56. Notre Dame 14–10.

Third quarter

- MICH – Allen Jefferson 1-yard run (J.D. Carlson), 7:49. Michigan 17–14.
- MICH – Desmond Howard 25-yard pass from Elvis Grbac (J.D. Carlson kick), 7:33. Michigan 24–14.

Fourth quarter

- ND – Rodney Culver 1-yard run (Craig Hentrich kick), 12:59. Michigan 24–21.
- ND – Adrian Jarrell 18-yard pass from Rick Mirer (Craig Hentrich kick), 1:40. Notre Dame 28–24.

Top passers

- MICH – Elvis Grbac – 17/30, 190 yards, 2 TD, 2 INT
- ND – Rick Mirer – 14/23, 165 yards, TD

Top rushers

- MICH – Jon Vaughn – 22 rushes, 201 yards
- ND – Rodney Culver – 19 rushes, 95 yards, TD

Top receivers

- MICH – Desmond Howard – 6 receptions, 133 yards, 2 TD
- ND – Raghib Ismail – 4 receptions, 42 yards

On September 15, No. 4 Michigan opened the season with a 28–24 loss to No. 1 Notre Dame in South Bend. The Wolverines fell behind 14–3 in the first quarter, then rallied to take a 24–14 lead after three quarters on a one-yard touchdown run by Allen Jefferson and two touchdown passes from Elvis Grbac to Desmond Howard. The Fighting Irish rallied in the fourth quarter, cutting the lead to 24–21 on a Rodney Culver 1-yard run, then scored the game winner with 1:40 left in the game on an 18-yard touchdown pass from Rick Mirer to Adrian Jarrell. After a Notre Dame interception of Grbac on the first play after the touchdown, the Wolverine defense forced a three and out and regained possession with 15 seconds left. Grbac threw two incompletions and the Fighting Irish held on for the 28–24 victory. Jon Vaughn gained 201 rushing yards, and Howard caught six passes for 133 yards.

=== UCLA ===
UCLA at #7 Michigan

| Team | 1 | 2 | 3 | 4 | Total |
|---|---|---|---|---|---|
| Bruins | 0 | 15 | 0 | 0 | 15 |
| • Wolverines | 14 | 14 | 0 | 10 | 38 |

- Date: September 22
- Location: Michigan Stadium
- Game attendance: 104,992

On September 22, No. 7 Michigan defeated unranked UCLA, 38–15, at Michigan Stadium. Tailback Jon Vaughn ran for 288 yards, the second-highest total in Michigan history behind Ron Johnson's 347 yards in 1968. Vaughn also scored three touchdowns, one was a 63-yard burst to seal the victory for Michigan. The Wolverines totaled 456 yards on the ground while holding UCLA to 44 rushing yards. UCLA's passing attack, however, was potent, as quarterback Tommy Maddox, in his first college start, completed 26 of 47 passes for 353 yards. It was Gary Moeller's first victory as Michigan's head coach.

=== Maryland ===
On September 29, No. 6 Michigan defeated Maryland, 45–17, at Michigan Stadium. Less than a minute into the game, Michigan outside linebacker Martin Davis returned an interception 27 yards for a touchdown less than a minute into the game. Running back Jon Vaughn, who gained over 200 yards in each of the first two games with an average of 9.0 yard per carry, was held in check with 89 yards and an average of 4.0 yards per carry. The Terrapins out-gained the Wolverines, but Maryland turned the ball over six times, including three interceptions. The Detroit News called the win an "ugly one", and Gary Moeller told the press, "I won't say it's a bad win, but I'm not pleased with the way we played."

=== At Wisconsin ===
#3 Michigan Wolverines (2–1) at Wisconsin Badgers (1–2)

| Quarter | 1 | 2 | 3 | 4 | Total |
|---|---|---|---|---|---|
| Michigan | 7 | 10 | 17 | 7 | 41 |
| Wisconsin | 0 | 0 | 0 | 3 | 3 |

at Camp Randall Stadium, Madison, Wisconsin

- Date: October 6
- Game attendance: 64,359

Game information

First quarter

- MICH – Desmond Howard 29-yard pass from Elvis Grbac (J.D. Carlson kick). Michigan 7–0.

Second quarter

- MICH – Derrick Alexander 8-yard pass from Elvis Grbac (J.D. Carlson kick). Michigan 14–0.
- MICH – J.D. Carlson 36-yard field goal. Michigan 17–0.

Third quarter

- MICH – J.D. Carlson 38-yard field goal. Michigan 20–0.
- MICH – Jon Vaughn 4-yard run (J.D. Carlson kick). Michigan 27–0.
- MICH – Desmond Howard 2-yard pass from Elvis Grbac (J.D. Carlson kick). Michigan 34–0.

Fourth quarter

- MICH – Ricky Powers 6-yard run (J.D. Carlson kick). Michigan 41–0.
- WIS – Rich Thompson 33-yard field goal. Michigan 41–3.

Top passers

- MICH – Elvis Grbac – 15/20, 154 yards, 3 TD
- WIS – Tony Lowery – 13/23, 129 yards, INT

Top rushers

- MICH – Ricky Powers – 12 rushes, 106 yards, TD
- WIS – Rafael Robinson – 11 rushes, 25 yards

Top receivers

- MICH – Desmond Howard – 6 receptions, 92 yards, 2 TD
- WIS – Lionell Crawford – 5 receptions, 53 yards

On October 6, No. 3 Michigan defeated Wisconsin, 41–3, before a crowd of 64,359 at Camp Randall Stadium in Madison, Wisconsin. The Wolverines out-gained the Bagers on the ground (360-18) and overall (534-189). Quarterback Elvis Grbac completed 15 of 20 passes for 154 yards and three touchdowns, including two touchdown passes to Desmond Howard. Freshman running back Ricky Powers tallied 106 rushing yard and scored his first touchdown as a Wolverine. The Badgers kicked a 33-yard field goal 4:28 remaining in the game to avoid the shutout.

With losses on the same date by both No. 1 Notre Dame and No. 2 Florida State, Michigan rose to the No. 1 ranking following its dominant victory over Wisconsin.

=== Michigan State ===
In one of the most controversial games in the history of the Michigan–Michigan State football rivalry, No. 1 Michigan lost to urnaked Michigan State by a 28–27 score in Ann Arbor. The game featured a second-quarter goal-line stand in which the Sparants stopped Jon Vaughn on four consecutive downs from the three-yard line and a 95-yard kickoff return by Desmond Howard in the fourth quarter. With six seconds left, Elvis Grbac threw a touchdown pass to Derrick Alexander to make it 28–27 Michigan State. Michigan coach Gary Moeller elected to go for a two-point conversion for the win. Grbac threw an incomplete pass to Desmond Howard, but the play was controversial since a Spartan defender appeared to have interfered with Howard. A columnist in The Detroit News wrote: "Michigan State cornerback Eddie Brown had tripped him. No discussion. No debate. It was a clear and obvious foul that a million and one eyes in the stands and on national television could see, but somehow not one single referee in this joint managed to catch a glimpse of it." The Wolverines then attempted an onside kick, which they recovered. Grbac scrambled and threw a Hail Mary that was tipped and intercepted to end the game.

=== Iowa ===
#23 Iowa at #10 Michigan

| Team | 1 | 2 | 3 | 4 | Total |
|---|---|---|---|---|---|
| • Hawkeyes | 0 | 7 | 3 | 14 | 24 |
| Wolverines | 7 | 7 | 6 | 3 | 23 |

- Date: October 20
- Location: Michigan Stadium
  Ann Arbor, MI
- Game attendance: 105,517
- Game weather: 60 °F (16 °C), Sunny, mild and breezy, Wind ESE 13–20 mph (21–32 km/h)
- TV announcers (ESPN): Wayne Larrivee

Scoring summary
| 1 | 2:10 | MICH | Vaughn 2-yard run (Carlson kick) | Michigan 7–0 |
| 2 | 11:25 | IOWA | Hughes 4-yard pass from Rodgers (Skillett kick) | Tied 7–7 |
| 2 | 7:34 | MICH | Jefferson 7-yard run (Carlson kick) | Michigan 14–7 |
| 3 | 8:18 | IOWA | Skillett 32-yard field goal | Michigan 14–10 |
| 3 | 4:35 | MICH | Ware 7-yard blocked punt return (run failed) | Michigan 20–10 |
| 4 | 12:16 | IOWA | Rodgers 1-yard run (Skillett kick) | Michigan 20–17 |
| 4 | 4:27 | MICH | Carlson 47-yard field goal | Michigan 23–17 |
| 4 | 1:09 | IOWA | Kujawa 1-yard run (Skillett kick) | IOWA 24–23 |

On October 20, Michigan, then ranked at No. 10, lost to No. 23 Iowa, 24–23, in Ann Arbor. It was Michigan's second consecutive one-point loss at home. The Wolverines took a 20–10 lead into the fourth quarter, but the Hawkeyes rallied with 14 fourth-quarter points to upset the Wolverines. Dave Ritter blocked an Iowa punt and Dwayne Ware returned it seven yards for a touchdown for the Wolverines. The two-point conversion failed. Matt Rodgers sneaked in from one yard out for the Hawkeyes and on the ensuing possession, the Hawkeyes drove down the field, and Paul Kujawa ran in from one yard out with 1:09 left in the game to hand Michigan its first homecoming loss since 1967.

=== Indiana ===
On October 27, No. 20 Michigan defeated unranked Indiana, 45–19, at Bloomington, Indiana. The Wolverines took a 31–0 lead lead in the first half while holding the Hoosiers with a first down on five consecutive drives. Michigan gained 295 rushing yards, and Elvis Grbac completed 14 of 18 passes for 166 yards and three touchdown, one each to wide receivers Desmond Howard and Derrick Alexander and tight end Dave Diebolt. Tailback Jon Vaughn gained 91 yards on 12 carries and passed the 1,000-yard marke for the season. Tripp Welborne gained 119 yards on five punt returns, the second best single-game yardage total by a punt returner in Michigan history. Lance Dottin, Dwayne Ware and Welborne each had an interception.

=== Purdue ===
#20 Michigan at Purdue

| Team | 1 | 2 | 3 | 4 | Total |
|---|---|---|---|---|---|
| • Wolverines | 10 | 21 | 0 | 7 | 38 |
| Boilermakers | 6 | 0 | 7 | 0 | 13 |

- Date: November 3
- Location: Ross–Ade Stadium, West Lafayette, IN
- Game attendance: 38,750

Scoring summary
| Q1 | PUR | Hunter 1 yard run (kick failed) | PUR 6–0 |
| Q1 | MICH | Carlson 44 yard field goal | PUR 6–3 |
| Q1 | MICH | Jefferson 2 yard run (Carlson kick) | MICH 10–6 |
| Q2 | MICH | Ware 17 yard blocked punt return (Carlson kick) | MICH 17–6 |
| Q2 | MICH | Howard 15 yard pass from Grbac (Carlson kick) | MICH 24–6 |
| Q2 | MICH | Jefferson 3 yard run (Carlson kick) | MICH 31–6 |
| Q3 | PUR | McManus 39 yard pass from Hunter (Wambold kick) | MICH 31–13 |
| Q4 | MICH | Jefferson 1 yard run (Carlson kick) | MICH 38–13 |

On November 3, No 20 Michigan defeated unranked Purdue, 38–13, in West Lafayette, Indiana. Michigan fell behind 6–0 midway through the first quarter, then scored 31 straight points to take a 31–6 lead into halftime. Michigan was helped by Purdue errors, including three lost fumbles, three interceptions, four sacks, and a blocked punt returned for a touchdown. Jon Vaughn led the Wolverines with 131 rushing yards on 25 carries, and Elvis Grbac completed 11 of 28 passes for 160 yards. Allen Jefferson also scored three touchdowns on six carries.

=== Illinois ===
On November 10, No. 19 Michigan defeated No. 17 Illinois, 22–17, at Michigan Stadium. J.D. Carlson kicked five field goals to lead the Wolverines. Freshman running back Ricky Powers ran for 113 yards and a touchdown. Elvis Grbac completed 10 of 18 passes for 129 yards. Vada Pinson intercepted a Jason Verduzco pass at the two-yard line with 6:00 remaining in the game. Michigan then ran out the clock with a long drive. Michigan played ball-control football, out-rushing the Illini by 303 yards to 35 and dominating time of possession by 40 minutes to 20. The game delivered "a small measure of revenge" for Moeller against the school that fired him as head coach in 1979.

=== Minnesota ===
Minnesota at #16 Michigan

| Team | 1 | 2 | 3 | 4 | Total |
|---|---|---|---|---|---|
| Golden Gophers | 3 | 7 | 0 | 8 | 18 |
| • Wolverines | 7 | 0 | 14 | 14 | 35 |

- Date: November 17
- Location: Michigan Stadium, Ann Arbor, MI
- Game attendance: 102,112

Scoring summary
| Q1 | MINN | Berglund 37 yard field goal | MINN 3–0 |
| Q1 | MICH | Howard 3 yard pass from Grbac (Carlson kick) | MICH 7–3 |
| Q2 | MINN | Fleetwood 5 yard run (Berglund kick) | MINN 10–7 |
| Q3 | MICH | Bunch 11 yard pass from Grbac (Carlson kick) | MICH 14–10 |
| Q3 | MICH | Alexander 3 yard pass from Grbac (Carlson kick) | MICH 21–10 |
| Q4 | MICH | Powers 5 yard run (Carlson kick) | MICH 28–10 |
| Q4 | MINN | Tingelhoff 4 yard pass from Schaffner (Evans pass from Schaffner) | MICH 28–18 |
| Q4 | MICH | Vaughn 1 yard run (Carlson kick) | MICH 35–18 |

On November 17, No. 16 Michigan defeated unranked Minnesota, 35–18, at Michigan Stadium. Michigan trailed 10–7 at halftime, but rallied in the second half with 28 points. Ricky Powers ran for 127 yards and a touchdown, and Elvis Grbac threw for 126 yards and three touchdown passes. Grbac's touchdown throws went to Desmond Howard, Derrick Alexander and Jarrod Bunch. Howard had eight catches for 86 yards. Lance Dottin and Neil Simpson had interceptions for the Wolverine defense. Senior fullback Jarrod Bunch, playing in his last home game, carried the Little Brown Jug across the field at the end of the game. It was the last game played on Michigan Stadium's artificial turf.

=== Ohio State ===
#15 Michigan at #19 Ohio State

| Team | 1 | 2 | 3 | 4 | Total |
|---|---|---|---|---|---|
| • Wolverines | 0 | 6 | 7 | 3 | 16 |
| Buckeyes | 3 | 7 | 3 | 0 | 13 |

- Date: November 24
- Location: Ohio Stadium, Columbus, Ohio
- Game attendance: 90,054

Scoring summary
| 1 | Ohio St | Williams 33-yard field goal | Ohio St 3-0 |
| 2 | Michigan | Carlson 27-yard field goal | Tie 3-3 |
| 2 | Michigan | Carlson 30-yard field goal | Michigan 6-3 |
| 2 | Ohio St | Graham 12-yard pass from Frey (Williams kick) | Ohio St 10-6 |
| 3 | Ohio St | Williams 43-yard field goal | Ohio St 13-6 |
| 3 | Michigan | Howard 12-yard pass from Grbac (Carlson kick) | Tie 13-13 |
| 4 | Michigan | Carlson 37-yard field goal | Michigan 16-13 |

On November 24, No. 15 Michigan defeated No. 19 Ohio State, 16–13, at Ohio Stadium. The Buckeyes led, 10–6, at halftime, as the Wolverines were limited to a pair of J.D. Carlson field goals in the second quarter. The Buckeyes added a field goal in the third quarter. After a long kickoff return by Derrick Alexander, Michigan tied the game at 13-13 on a 12-yard touchdown pass from Elvis Grbac to Desmond Howard on a post pattern. With four minutes remaining, Carlson missed badly on a 38-yard field goal attempt. On the ensuing drive, Ohio State went for it on fourth and less than a yard to go from its own 30-yard line. The Wolverines stuffed quarterback Greg Frey and took possession. Michigan moved the ball carefully, methodically, and with time for one final play, Carlson kicked a game-winning 37-yard field goal as time expired to give Michigan a 16–13 win.

=== Gator Bowl ===
Michigan finished the regular season ranked No. 12 in the AP poll. They accepted an invitation to play No. 15 Ole Miss in the Gator Bowl on New Year's Day. Michigan defeated Ole Miss, 35–3, and broke Michigan's single-game record with 715 yards of total offense. Elvis Grbac passed for 296 yards and tied a school record with four touhdown passes. Desmond Howard caught six passes for 167 yards and two touchdowns, two Michigan backs gained over 100 rushing yards: Jon Vaughn (128 yards) and Ricky Powers (112 yards).

After both teams exchanged early turnovers, Michigan opened the scoring when Grbac threw deep down the right side of the field to Howard for a career-long 63-yard touchdown reception. Ole Miss scored its only points of the game in the second quarter when Brian Lee kicked a career-long and Gator Bowl record 51-yard field goal to trim the margin to 7–3. Following a 32-yard Howard return of the ensuing kickoff, Vaughn sprinted around left end for a gain of 37 yards and a first down at the Rebel 31. Five plays later, Grbac threw seven yards to Jarrod Bunch for a 14–3 halftime lead. Grbac's touchdown pass, his 19th of the season, broke Jim Harbaugh's Michigan single-season record for touchdown passes thrown (18 in 1985). Early in the third quarter, Grbac threw a screen pass to Howard who eluded the Ole Miss defense en route to a 50-yard touchdown reception and a 21–3 Michigan lead with 10:53 left in the third quarter. Later in the quarter, Ole Miss quarterback Tom Luke was intercepted by Todd Plate. Powers ran 44 yards to the five-yard line, and Bunch scored on the next play, giving Michigan a 28–3 lead. As the third quarter was nearing completion, Grbac connected with Derrick Alexander over the middle for a 33-yard touchdown—Grbac's fourth of the game. That closed the scoring, giving Michigan a resounding 35–3 win. Offensive linemen Dean Dingman, Tom Dohring, Greg Skrepenak, Matt Elliott and Steve Everitt shared the game's most valuable player honor.

== Personnel ==
1990 Michigan Wolverines football team roster
Players
Coaches
Offense

| Pos. | # | Name | Class |
|---|---|---|---|
| WR | | Derrick Alexander |
| RB | | Jarrod Bunch |
| WR | | Alfie Burch |
| OL | | Joe Cocozzo |
| TE | | Dave Diebolt |
| OL | | Dean Dingman |
| OL | | Tom Dohring |
| OL | | Steve Everitt |
| QB | | Elvis Grbac |
| WR | 21 | Desmond Howard |
| RB | | Allen Jefferson |
| RB | | Jesse Johnson |
| RB | | Burnie Legette |
| TE | | Tony McGee |
| RB | | Mike Nadlicki |
| WR | | Kevin Owen |
| RB | | Ricky Powers |
| OL | | Greg Skrepenak |
| QB | | Ken Sollom |
| RB | | Jon Vaughn |
| RB | | Dennis Washington |
| RB | | Shawn Watson |

Defense

| Pos. | # | Name | Class |
|---|---|---|---|
| LB | | Erick Anderson |
| LB | | Chris Bohn |
| DB | | Corwin Brown |
| LB | | Martin Davis |
| LB | | David Dobreff |
| DB | | Lance Dottin |
| DL | | Mike Evans |
| OL | | Chris Hutchinson |
| DB | | David Key |
| ILB | 39 | Curt Mallory | Jr |
| LB | | Alex Marshall |
| LB | | John Milligan |
| DB | | Vada Murray |
| DL | | T.J. Osman |
| DB | | Todd Plate |
| DL | | Steve Rekowski |
| LB | | Neil Simpson |
| LB | | Brian Townsend |
| DB | | Tripp Welborne |

Special teams

| Pos. | # | Name | Class |

Head coach

- Gary Moeller

Coordinators/assistant coaches

- Phil Bromley
- Darryl Bullock (GA)
- Tirrel Burton (RB)
- Cam Cameron (QB/WR)
- Lloyd Carr (DC)
- Jerry Hanlon (OL)
- Bill Harris
- Jim Herrmann (LB)
- Les Miles
- Bobby Morrison
- Tom Reed

Legend

- (C) Team captain
- (S) Suspended
- (I) Ineligible
- Injured
- Redshirt

== Statistics ==
=== Team statistics ===
On offense, the Wolverines gained an average of 253.1 rushing yards and 153.7 passing yards per game. They led the Big Ten in rushing offense for all games (264.6 yards per game), although Michigan State won the title for conference games. They also led in passing efficiency for all games (137.7), although Iowa led for conference games. They were the conference leader in total offense for all games (432.5 yards per game), although Iowa won the title for conference games. The 715 yards of total offense in the January 1, 1991 Gator Bowl against Ole Miss stood as the school record until October 17, 2009.

On defense, the team gave up 105.7 rushing yards and 217.5 passing yards per game. The team earned the first of four consecutive and six 1990s Big Ten rushing defense statistical championships for all games. Iowa won the title for conference games. The team led the conference in total defense for conference games (289.4), while Iowa led for all games. The team led the Big Ten Conference in scoring defense for conference games (16.9 points per game) and all games (16.5). They also led the Big Ten in quarterback sacks for conference games (3.6 sacks per game) and all games (3.6 sacks per game). They led the conference in turnover margin (+0.92) in all games, while Illinois led for conference games. They led the conference in punt return average in conference games (17.4 yards per return) and all games (15.2). The season marked the third consecutive year that the team led the conference in kick return average in conference games (26.5 yards per return) and all games (27.3).

=== Individual statistics ===
Passing. Quarterback Elvis Grbac completed 139 of 241 passes (57.7%) for 1,615 yards, 17 touchdowns, 9 interceptions, and a 146.8 passer rating. Grbac won his first of three consecutive Big Ten passing statistical championships (137.1 passing efficiency in all games). Grbac became the fourth Wolverine to post a four-touchdown pass performance against Mississippi State, he would become the first to post two the following season and later in his career would post a third such performance. Grbac became the first single-season 20-touchdown passer with 21, eclipsing Jim Harbaugh's 18 in 1985, a record he would extend to 25 the following year.

Rushing. Running back Jon Vaughn led the team in rushing with 1,236 yards on 201 carries (6.1 yards per carry). Ricky Powers ranked second with 636 rushing yards and Jarrod Bunch third with 461 rushing yards. Vaughn set a school record for career yards per carry (6.29, min 200 carries), eclipsing Rob Lytle's 16-year-old record. Vaughn opened the 1990 season by posting 201 rushing yards on September 15 against Notre Dame and following it up with 288 rushing yards against UCLA on September 22. The feat made him the first Michigan back to rush for 200 yards in consecutive games, a feat not duplicated until Mike Hart did so in 2004.

Receiving. Desmond Howard led the team with 57 receptions for 858 yards (15.1-yard average) and nine touchdowns. Derrick Alexander ranked second with 29 receptions for 400 yards and five touchdowns. He also led the Big Ten with 85.4 receiving yards per game.

Scoring. Kicker J.D. Carlson led the team in scoring 95 points, converting 42 of 42 extra-point kicks and 16 of 26 on field goal attempts. He was followed by Desmond Howard (72 points) and Jon Vaughn (54 points). Carlson led the Big Ten with an average of 7.9 points per game for all games, although he lost the conference per game championship to Michigan State's Hyland Hickson.

== Awards and honors ==
The individuals in the sections below earned recognition for meritorious performances.

=== National ===
- All-Americans: Tripp Welborne, Dean Dingman, Greg Skrepenak

=== Conference ===
- All-Conference: J.D. Carlson, Dean Dingman, Tripp Welborne, Jon Vaughn, Greg Skrepenak, Desmond Howard, Tom Dohring, Erick Anderson
- Big Ten Co-Offensive Player of the Year: Vaughn (coaches)

=== Team ===
- Most Valuable Player: Tripp Welborne
- Frederick Matthei Award: Erick Anderson
- Arthur Robinsion Scholarship Award: David Ritter
- Dick Katcher Award: T.J. Osman
- Hugh Rader Jr. Award: Dean Dingman
- Robert P. Ufer Award: John Milligan
