= Mike Dumas =

American football player (born 1969)

No. 38, 20
- Position: Safety

Personal information
- Born: March 18, 1969 (age 57); Grand Rapids, Michigan, U.S.
- Listed height: 6 ft 0 in (1.83 m)
- Listed weight: 198 lb (90 kg)

Career information
- High school: Lowell (Vergennes Township, Michigan)
- College: Indiana
- NFL draft: 1991: 2nd round, 28th overall pick

Career history
- Houston Oilers (1991–1993); Buffalo Bills (1994); Jacksonville Jaguars (1995); San Diego Chargers (1997–2000); Chicago Bears (2001)*
- * Offseason or practice squad member only

Awards and highlights
- 2× First-team All-Big Ten (1989, 1990)

Career NFL statistics
- Tackles: 355
- Interceptions: 7
- Fumble recoveries: 9
- Stats at Pro Football Reference

Michael Dion Dumas (born March 18, 1969) is an American former professional football player who was a safety for eight seasons in the National Football League (NFL) from 1991 to 2000. He played college football for the Indiana Hoosiers and was selected by the Houston Oilers in the second round of the 1991 NFL draft with the 28th overall pick.

Dumas is a 1987 graduate of Lowell High School.
