= 1990 Michigan State Spartans football team =

American college football season

1990 Michigan State Spartans football

Big Ten co-champion John Hancock Bowl champion

John Hancock Bowl, W 17–16 vs. USC
- Conference: Big Ten Conference

Ranking
- Coaches: No. 14
- AP: No. 16
- Record: 8–3–1 (6–2 Big Ten)
- Head coach: George Perles (8th season)
- Offensive coordinator: Morris Watts (5th season)
- Defensive coordinator: Norm Parker (3rd season)
- MVPs: Dan Enos; Hyland Hickson
- Captains: Dan Enos; Mike Iaquaniello; Carlos Jenkins; Eric Moten
- Home stadium: Spartan Stadium

1990 Big Ten Conference football standings
	Conf.					Overall
Team	W		L		T	W		L		T
No. 7 Michigan +	6	–	2	–	0	9	–	3	–	0
No. 16 Michigan State +	6	–	2	–	0	8	–	3	–	1
No. 25 Illinois +	6	–	2	–	0	8	–	4	–	0
No. 18 Iowa +	6	–	2	–	0	8	–	4	–	0
Ohio State	5	–	2	–	1	7	–	4	–	1
Minnesota	5	–	3	–	0	6	–	5	–	0
Indiana	3	–	4	–	1	6	–	5	–	1
Northwestern	1	–	7	–	0	2	–	9	–	0
Purdue	1	–	7	–	0	2	–	9	–	0
Wisconsin	0	–	8	–	0	1	–	10	–	0
+ – Conference co-champions; Rankings from AP Poll

The 1990 Michigan State Spartans football team represented Michigan State University as a member of the Big Ten Conference during the 1990 NCAA Division I-A football season. Led by eighth-year head coach George Perles, the Spartans compiled an overall record of 8–3–1 with a mark of 6–2 in conference play, placing in four-way tie for the Big Ten title with Illinois, Iowa, and Michigan.

== Schedule ==
Date	Time	Opponent	Rank	Site	TV	Result	Attendance	Source
September 15	7:30 p.m.	at Syracuse*	No. 19	Carrier Dome; Syracuse, NY	ESPN	T 23–23	49,822	
September 22	3:30 p.m.	No. 1 Notre Dame*	No. 24	Spartan Stadium; East Lansing, MI (rivalry)	ABC	L 19–20	80,401	
September 29	7:05 p.m.	at Rutgers*	No. 22	Giants Stadium; East Rutherford, NJ	TKR Sports	W 34–10	26,188	
October 6	1:05 p.m.	Iowa	No. 18	Spartan Stadium; East Lansing, MI		L 7–12	76,873	
October 13	3:30 p.m.	at No. 1 Michigan		Michigan Stadium; Ann Arbor, MI (rivalry)	ABC	W 28–27	106,188	
October 20	3:30 p.m.	at No. 8 Illinois	No. 24	Memorial Stadium; Champaign, IL	ABC	L 13–15	70,398	
October 27	1:05 p.m.	Purdue^{†}		Spartan Stadium; East Lansing, MI		W 55–33	77,343	
November 3	12:30 p.m.	Indiana		Spartan Stadium; East Lansing, MI (rivalry)	ESPN	W 45–20	74,261	
November 10	2:30 p.m.	at Minnesota		Hubert H. Humphrey Metrodome; Minneapolis, MN		W 28–16	38,731	
November 17	2:05 p.m.	at Northwestern	No. 24	Dyche Stadium; Evanston, IL		W 29–22	24,959	
November 24	1:05 p.m.	Wisconsin	No. 24	Spartan Stadium; East Lansing, MI		W 14–9	60,517	
December 31	2:30 p.m.	vs. No. 21 USC*	No. 22	Sun Bowl; El Paso, TX (John Hancock Bowl)	CBS	W 17–16	50,562	
*Non-conference game; ^{†}Homecoming; Rankings from AP Poll released prior to the game; All times are in Eastern time; Source:

== Game summaries ==
=== Michigan ===
Team	1	2	3	4	Total
• Michigan State	7	0	7	14	28
Michigan	7	0	7	13	27

- Date: October 13
- Location: Michigan Stadium, Ann Arbor, Michigan
- Game attendance: 106,180
- Game weather: Sunny
- TV announcers (ABC): Keith Jackson, Bob Griese & Jack Arute

Scoring summary
1		MICH	Alexander 16-yard pass from Grbac (Carlson kick)	MICH 7-0
1		MSU	Enos 8-yard run (Langeloh kick)	Tied 7-7
3		MICH	Bunch 1-yard run (Carlson kick)	MICH 14-7
3		MSU	Hickson 4-yard pass from Enos (Langeloh kick)	Tied 14-14
4		MSU	Hickson 26-yard run (Langeloh kick)	MSU 21-14
4	5:50	MICH	Howard 95-yard kickoff return (Carlson kick)	Tied 21-21
4		MSU	Duckett 9-yard run (Langeloh kick)	MSU 28-21
4	0:06	MICH	Alexander 7-yard pass from Grbac (pass failed)	MSU 28-27

== Personnel ==
- OT No. 77 Eric Moten, Sr.

== Team members in the NFL ==
Player	Position	Round	Pick	NFL Franchise
Bobby Wilson		1	17	Washington Redskins
Dixon Edwards	Linebacker	2	37	Dallas Cowboys
Eric Moten	Guard	2	47	San Diego Chargers
Carlos Jenkins	Linebacker	3	65	Minnesota Vikings
Duane Young	Tight end	5	123	San Diego Chargers
James Bradley	Wide receiver	7	181	Indianapolis Colts
Hyland Hickson	Running back	10	265	Tampa Bay Buccaneers
Cliff Confer	Defensive end	12	332	San Francisco 49ers
