= 1990 Rutgers Scarlet Knights football team =

American college football season

1990 Rutgers Scarlet Knights football
- Conference: Independent
- Record: 3–8
- Head coach: Doug Graber (1st season)
- Offensive coordinator: Stan Parrish (1st season)
- Defensive coordinator: Rich Rachel (1st season)
- Home stadium: Rutgers Stadium; Giants Stadium

1990 Major eastern college football independents records
	Conf.					Overall
Team	W		L		T	W		L		T
No. 11 Penn State $	6	–	0	–	0	9	–	3	–	0
Syracuse	4	–	1	–	1	7	–	4	–	2
Temple	3	–	2	–	0	7	–	4	–	0
West Virginia	2	–	3	–	0	4	–	7	–	0
Pittsburgh	2	–	3	–	1	3	–	7	–	1
Boston College	2	–	4	–	0	4	–	7	–	0
Rutgers	0	–	6	–	0	3	–	8	–	0
$ – Lambert Trophy Winner; Rankings from AP Poll

1990 NCAA Division I-A independents football records
	Conf.			Overall
Team	W	L	T	W		L		T
No. 14 Louisville		–		10	–	1	–	1
No. 3 Miami (FL)		–		10	–	2	–	0
No. 4 Florida State		–		10	–	2	–	0
No. 6 Notre Dame		–		9	–	3	–	0
No. 11 Penn State		–		9	–	3	–	0
Louisiana Tech		–		8	–	3	–	1
Southern Miss		–		8	–	4	–	0
Temple		–		7	–	4	–	0
Syracuse		–		7	–	4	–	2
Army		–		6	–	5	–	0
Northern Illinois		–		6	–	5	–	0
South Carolina		–		6	–	5	–	0
Virginia Tech		–		6	–	5	–	0
East Carolina		–		5	–	6	–	0
Southwestern Louisiana		–		5	–	6	–	0
Navy		–		5	–	6	–	0
Memphis State		–		4	–	6	–	1
Boston College		–		4	–	7	–	0
Tulane		–		4	–	7	–	0
West Virginia		–		4	–	7	–	0
Akron		–		3	–	7	–	1
Pittsburgh		–		3	–	7	–	1
Rutgers		–		3	–	8	–	0
Tulsa		–		3	–	8	–	0
Cincinnati		–		1	–	10	–	0
Rankings from AP Poll

The 1990 Rutgers Scarlet Knights football team represented Rutgers University as an independent during the 1990 NCAA Division I-A football season. In their first season under head coach Doug Graber, the Scarlet Knights compiled a 3–8 record while competing as an independent and were outscored by their opponents 302 to 173. The team won games against Kentucky (24–8), Colgate (28–17), and Akron (20–17). The team's statistical leaders included Tom Tarver with 1,348 passing yards, Tekay Dorsey with 505 rushing yards, and James Guarantino with 386 receiving yards.

== Schedule ==
Date	Opponent	Site	Result	Attendance	Source
September 8	Kentucky	Giants Stadium; East Rutherford, NJ	W 24–8	21,141	
September 15	Colgate	Rutgers Stadium; Piscataway, NJ	W 28–7	18,215	
September 22	at Penn State	Beaver Stadium; University Park, PA	L 0–28	85,194	
September 29	No. 22 Michigan State	Giants Stadium; East Rutherford, NJ	L 10–34	26,188	
October 6	at Boston College	Alumni Stadium; Chestnut Hill, MA	L 14–19	31,262	
October 13	at Pittsburgh	Pitt Stadium; Pittsburgh, PA	L 21–45	32,041	
October 20	at Syracuse	Carrier Dome; Syracuse, NY	L 0–42	49,521	
October 27	Akron^{†}	Rutgers Stadium; Piscataway, NJ	W 20–17	25,855	
November 3	at Army	Michie Stadium; West Point, NY	L 31–35	38,945	
November 10	West Virginia	Giants Stadium; East Rutherford, NJ	L 3–28	11,117	
November 17	at Temple	Veterans Stadium; Philadelphia, PA	L 22–29	16,911	
^{†}Homecoming; Rankings from AP Poll released prior to the game

== Personnel ==
1990 Rutgers Scarlet Knights football team roster
Players
Coaches
Offense

Pos.	#	Name	Class
WR	17	Chris Brantley	So
QB	13	Tom Tarver	Sr

Defense

Pos.	#	Name	Class
CB	1	Ron Allen	Sr
DB	9	Eric Deering	Sr
DT	99	Scott Miller	Sr
LB	93	Elnardo Webster	Sr

Special teams

Pos.	#	Name	Class

Head coach

- Doug Graber

Coordinators/assistant coaches

- Stan Parrish (OC)
- Rich Rachel (DC)
- John Snell (GA)

Legend

- (C) Team captain
- (S) Suspended
- (I) Ineligible
- Injured
- Redshirt
