= 1990 Penn State Nittany Lions football team =

American college football season

1990 Penn State Nittany Lions football

Eastern champion

Blockbuster Bowl, L 17–24 vs. Florida State
- Conference: Independent

Ranking
- Coaches: No. 10
- AP: No. 11
- Record: 9–3
- Head coach: Joe Paterno (25th season)
- Offensive coordinator: Fran Ganter (7th season)
- Offensive scheme: Pro-style
- Defensive coordinator: Jerry Sandusky (14th season)
- Base defense: 4–3
- Captains: Matt McCartin; Willie Thomas; Leroy Thompson
- Home stadium: Beaver Stadium

1990 Major eastern college football independents records
	Conf.					Overall
Team	W		L		T	W		L		T
No. 11 Penn State $	6	–	0	–	0	9	–	3	–	0
Syracuse	4	–	1	–	1	7	–	4	–	2
Temple	3	–	2	–	0	7	–	4	–	0
West Virginia	2	–	3	–	0	4	–	7	–	0
Pittsburgh	2	–	3	–	1	3	–	7	–	1
Boston College	2	–	4	–	0	4	–	7	–	0
Rutgers	0	–	6	–	0	3	–	8	–	0
$ – Lambert Trophy Winner; Rankings from AP Poll

1990 NCAA Division I-A independents football records
	Conf.			Overall
Team	W	L	T	W		L		T
No. 14 Louisville		–		10	–	1	–	1
No. 3 Miami (FL)		–		10	–	2	–	0
No. 4 Florida State		–		10	–	2	–	0
No. 6 Notre Dame		–		9	–	3	–	0
No. 11 Penn State		–		9	–	3	–	0
Louisiana Tech		–		8	–	3	–	1
Southern Miss		–		8	–	4	–	0
Temple		–		7	–	4	–	0
Syracuse		–		7	–	4	–	2
Army		–		6	–	5	–	0
Northern Illinois		–		6	–	5	–	0
South Carolina		–		6	–	5	–	0
Virginia Tech		–		6	–	5	–	0
East Carolina		–		5	–	6	–	0
Southwestern Louisiana		–		5	–	6	–	0
Navy		–		5	–	6	–	0
Memphis State		–		4	–	6	–	1
Boston College		–		4	–	7	–	0
Tulane		–		4	–	7	–	0
West Virginia		–		4	–	7	–	0
Akron		–		3	–	7	–	1
Pittsburgh		–		3	–	7	–	1
Rutgers		–		3	–	8	–	0
Tulsa		–		3	–	8	–	0
Cincinnati		–		1	–	10	–	0
Rankings from AP Poll

The 1990 Penn State Nittany Lions football team represented the Pennsylvania State University as an independent during the 1990 NCAA Division I-A football season. Led by 25th-year head coach Joe Paterno, the Nittany Lions compiled a record of 9–3. Penn State was invited to the Blockbuster Bowl, where the Nittany Lions lost to Florida State. The team played home games at Beaver Stadium in University Park, Pennsylvania.

== Schedule ==
Date	Time	Opponent	Rank	Site	TV	Result	Attendance	Source
September 8	12:10 p.m.	Texas	No. 21	Beaver Stadium; University Park, PA	Raycom	L 13–17	85,973	
September 15	3:30 p.m.	at No. 6 USC		Los Angeles Memorial Coliseum; Los Angeles, CA	ABC	L 14–19	70,594	
September 22	1:00 p.m.	Rutgers		Beaver Stadium; University Park, PA		W 28–0	85,194	
October 6	1:00 p.m.	Temple^{†}		Beaver Stadium; University Park, PA		W 48–10	85,874	
October 13	2:30 p.m.	Syracuse		Beaver Stadium; University Park, PA (rivalry)	CBS	W 27–21	86,002	
October 20	12:10 p.m.	at Boston College		Alumni Stadium; Chestnut Hill, MA	CBS	W 40–21	32,000	
October 27	5:00 p.m.	at Alabama		Bryant–Denny Stadium; Tuscaloosa, AL (rivalry)	ESPN	W 9–0	70,123	
November 3	1:00 p.m.	at West Virginia	No. 24	Mountaineer Field; Morgantown, WV (rivalry)		W 31–19	66,461	
November 10	1:00 p.m.	Maryland	No. 21	Beaver Stadium; University Park, PA (rivalry)		W 24–10	83,000	
November 17	4:00 p.m.	at No. 1 Notre Dame	No. 18	Notre Dame Stadium; Notre Dame, IN (rivalry)	ESPN	W 24–21	59,075	
November 24	2:30 p.m.	Pittsburgh	No. 11	Beaver Stadium; University Park, PA (rivalry)	CBS	W 22–17	85,180	
December 28	8:00 p.m.	vs. No. 6 Florida State	No. 7	Joe Robbie Stadium; Miami Gardens, FL (Blockbuster Bowl)	Raycom	L 17–24	75,129	
^{†}Homecoming; Rankings from AP Poll released prior to the game; All times are in Eastern time

== Game summaries ==
=== At USC ===
Team	1	2	3	4	Total
Penn State	0	7	0	7	14
• USC	7	6	6	0	19

- Date: September 15
- Location: Los Angeles Memorial Coliseum

Scoring summary
Q1	USC	Griffin 5 yard pass from Marinovich (Rodriguez kick)	USC 7–0
Q2	PSU	Golden 8 yard pass from Sacca (Fayak kick)	Tie 7–7
Q2	USC	Rodriguez 26 yard field goal	USC 10–7
Q2	USC	Rodriguez 46 yard field goal	USC 13–7
Q3	USC	Ervins 1 yard run (run failed)	USC 19–7
Q4	PSU	Thompson 2 yard run (Fayak kick)	USC 19–14

=== At West Virginia ===
Team	1	2	3	4	Total
• Penn State	7	7	7	10	31
West Virginia	3	3	6	7	19

- Date: November 3
- Location: Mountaineer Field
- Game attendance: 66,461

Scoring summary
Q1	PSU	Perry 30 yard interception return (Fayak kick)	PSU 7–0
Q1	WVU	Johnson 20 yard field goal	PSU 7–3
Q2	PSU	T. Smith 9 yard pass from Bill (Fayak kick)	PSU 14–3
Q2	WVU	Carroll 39 yard field goal	PSU 14–6
Q3	WVU	Ford 11 yard run (run failed)	PSU 14–12
Q3	PSU	Bill 5 yard run (Fayak kick)	PSU 21–12
Q4	PSU	Collins 19 yard run (Fayak kick)	PSU 28–12
Q4	PSU	Fayak 37 yard field goal	PSU 31–12
Q4	WVU	Statten 5 yard pass from Jones (Johnson kick)	PSU 31–19

== Roster ==
1990 Penn State Nittany Lions football team roster
Players
Coaches
Offense

Pos.	#	Name	Class
RB	20	Richie Anderson	So
OT	67	Todd Burger	So
QB	12	Tom Bill	Sr
FB	27	Gary Brown	Sr
WR	26	David Daniels	Sr
G	80	John Gerak	So
TE	89	Al Golden	Jr
C	66	Greg Huntington	So
G	57	Sean Love	Jr
WR	24	O. J. McDuffie	So
OT	71	Todd Rucci	So
QB	19	Tony Sacca	Jr
C	77	E. J. Sandusky	Jr
OT	76	Paul Siever	Jr
WR	8	Terry Smith	Jr

Defense

Pos.	#	Name	Class
LB	13	Matt Baggett	Jr
LB	38	Mark D'Onofrio	Jr
DT	68	Mark Flythe	Jr
LB	42	Keith Goganious	Jr
DT	85	Frank Giannetti	Sr
LB	58	Reggie Givens	So
CB	6	Leonard Humphries	Jr
LB	99	Rich McKenzie	So
S	9	Darren Perry	Jr

Special teams

Pos.	#	Name	Class
P	4	Doug Helkowski	Jr

Head coach

- Joe Paterno

Coordinators/assistant coaches

Legend

- (C) Team captain
- (S) Suspended
- (I) Ineligible
- Injured
- Redshirt

Roster

== NFL draft ==
Six Nittany Lions were drafted in the 1991 NFL draft.

Round	Pick	Overall	Name	Position	Team
3rd	19	74	David Daniels	Wide receiver	Seattle Seahawks
6th	19	158	Leroy Thompson	Running back	Pittsburgh Steelers
8th	19	214	Gary Brown	Running back	Houston Oilers
10th	13	263	Frank Giannetti	Defensive end	Indianapolis Colts
10th	14	264	Sean Love	Offensive guard	Dallas Cowboys
12th	13	319	Rob Luedeke	Center	Indianapolis Colts
