= 1990 Florida State Seminoles football team =

American college football season

1990 Florida State Seminoles football

Blockbuster Bowl champion

Blockbuster Bowl, W 24–17 vs. Penn State
- Conference: Independent

Ranking
- Coaches: No. 4
- AP: No. 4
- Record: 10–2
- Head coach: Bobby Bowden (15th season)
- Offensive coordinator: Brad Scott (1st season)
- Offensive scheme: I formation, pro set
- Defensive coordinator: Mickey Andrews (7th season)
- Base defense: 4–3
- Captains: Lawrence Dawsey; Corian Freeman; Anthony Moss; Bill Ragans
- Home stadium: Doak Campbell Stadium

1990 NCAA Division I-A independents football records
	Conf.			Overall
Team	W	L	T	W		L		T
No. 14 Louisville		–		10	–	1	–	1
No. 3 Miami (FL)		–		10	–	2	–	0
No. 4 Florida State		–		10	–	2	–	0
No. 6 Notre Dame		–		9	–	3	–	0
No. 11 Penn State		–		9	–	3	–	0
Louisiana Tech		–		8	–	3	–	1
Southern Miss		–		8	–	4	–	0
Temple		–		7	–	4	–	0
Syracuse		–		7	–	4	–	2
Army		–		6	–	5	–	0
Northern Illinois		–		6	–	5	–	0
South Carolina		–		6	–	5	–	0
Virginia Tech		–		6	–	5	–	0
East Carolina		–		5	–	6	–	0
Southwestern Louisiana		–		5	–	6	–	0
Navy		–		5	–	6	–	0
Memphis State		–		4	–	6	–	1
Boston College		–		4	–	7	–	0
Tulane		–		4	–	7	–	0
West Virginia		–		4	–	7	–	0
Akron		–		3	–	7	–	1
Pittsburgh		–		3	–	7	–	1
Rutgers		–		3	–	8	–	0
Tulsa		–		3	–	8	–	0
Cincinnati		–		1	–	10	–	0
Rankings from AP Poll

The 1990 Florida State Seminoles football team represented Florida State University as an independent during the 1990 NCAA Division I-A football season. Led by 15th-year head coach Bobby Bowden, the Seminoles compiled a record of 10–2 with win in the Blockbuster Bowl over Penn State. Florida State played home games at Doak Campbell Stadium in Tallahassee, Florida.

== Schedule ==
Date	Time	Opponent	Rank	Site	TV	Result	Attendance	Source
September 8	7:00 p.m.	East Carolina	No. 3	Doak Campbell Stadium; Tallahassee, FL	PPV	W 45–24	61,983	
September 15	7:00 p.m.	No. 6 (I-AA) Georgia Southern	No. 3	Doak Campbell Stadium; Tallahassee, FL	PPV	W 48–6	62,111	
September 22	8:00 p.m.	at Tulane	No. 2	Louisiana Superdome; New Orleans, LA	PPV	W 31–13	32,170	
September 29	7:00 p.m.	Virginia Tech	No. 2	Doak Campbell Stadium; Tallahassee, FL	PPV	W 39–28	60,301	
October 6	2:00 p.m.	at No. 9 Miami (FL)	No. 2	Miami Orange Bowl; Miami, FL (rivalry)	CBS	L 22–31	80,396	
October 20	7:30 p.m.	at No. 5 Auburn	No. 7	Jordan-Hare Stadium; Auburn, AL	ESPN	L 17–20	85,214	
October 27	12:30 p.m.	LSU	No. 12	Doak Campbell Stadium; Tallahassee, FL	WTBS	W 42–3	60,111	
November 3	12:00 p.m.	at South Carolina	No. 12	Williams–Brice Stadium; Columbia, SC	SUN	W 41–10	71,438	
November 10	2:00 p.m.	Cincinnati^{†}	No. 12	Doak Campbell Stadium; Tallahassee, FL		W 70–21	59,678	
November 17	1:00 p.m.	vs. Memphis State	No. 9	Florida Citrus Bowl; Orlando, FL		W 35–3	55,190	
December 1	7:30 p.m.	No. 6 Florida	No. 8	Doak Campbell Stadium; Tallahassee, FL (rivalry)	ESPN	W 45–30	63,190	
December 28	8:00 p.m.	vs. No. 7 Penn State	No. 6	Joe Robbie Stadium; Miami Gardens, FL (Blockbuster Bowl)	Raycom	W 24–17	75,129	
^{†}Homecoming; Rankings from AP Poll released prior to the game; All times are in Eastern time

== Rankings ==
Ranking movements Legend: ██ Increase in ranking ██ Decrease in ranking т = Tied with team above or below ( ) = First-place votes
	Week															
Poll	Pre	1	2	3	4	5	6	7	8	9	10	11	12	13	14	Final
AP	4 (6)	3 т (7)	3 (11)	2 (10)	2 (11)	2 (10)	10	7	12	12	12	9	8	8	6	4
Coaches	3 (8)	3	2 (10)	2 (9)	2 (13)	2 (10)	8	7	11	11	11	10	9	8	5	4

== Game summaries ==
=== Miami (FL) ===
#2 Florida State at #9 Miami (FL)

Team	1	2	3	4	Total
Seminoles	0	6	3	13	22
• Hurricanes	10	14	0	7	31

- Date: October 6
- Location: Orange Bowl, Miami, FL
- Game attendance: 80,396

=== Auburn ===
#7 Florida State at #5 Auburn

Team	1	2	3	4	Total
Seminoles	0	17	0	0	17
• Tigers	7	0	3	10	20

- Date: October 20
- Location: Jordan–Hare Stadium

=== LSU ===
LSU Tigers at #12 Florida State Seminoles

Quarter	1	2	3	4	Total
LSU	3	0	0	0	3
Florida St	14	14	0	14	42

at Doak Campbell Stadium, Tallahassee, Florida

- Date: October 27
- Game attendance: 60,111
- Recap/Box

Game information

First quarter

- FSU – Amp Lee 9-yard run (Richie Andrews kick), 14:43. Florida St 7–0. Drive: 2 plays, 16 yards.
- LSU – Pedro Suarez 35-yard field goal, 8:11. Florida St 7–3. Drive: 64 yards.
- FSU – Amp Lee 6-yard run (Richie Andrews kick), 0:16. Florida St 14–3. Drive:

Second quarter

- FSU – Amp Lee 2-yard run (Richie Andrews kick), 0:52. Florida St 21–3. Drive: 8 plays.
- FSU – Shannon Baker 38-yard pass from Casey Weldon (Richie Andrews kick), 0:00. Florida St 28–3. Drive:

Third quarter

- No scoring

Fourth quarter

- FSU – Paul Moore 6-yard run (Richie Andrews kick), 12:30. Florida St 35–3. Drive: 50 yards.
- FSU – Felix Harris 31-yard run (Richie Andrews kick), 3:58. Florida St 42–3. Drive:

Top passers

- LSU
- FSU – Casey Weldon – 15/25, 229 yards, TD, INT

Top rushers

- LSU – Harvey Williams – 22 rushes, 93 yards
- FSU – Maurice Pinckney – 4 rushes, 52 yards

Top receivers

- LSU
- FSU – Matt Frier – 1 reception, 54 yards

Bobby Bowden's 200th win

=== Florida ===
#6 Florida Gators (9–1) at #8 Florida State Seminoles (8–2)

Quarter	1	2	3	4	Total
Florida	3	7	6	14	30
Florida St	17	7	14	7	45

at Doak Campbell Stadium, Tallahassee, Florida

- Date: December 1, 1990
- Game weather: Clear
- Game attendance: 63,190
- Recap/Box Score

Game information

First quarter

- FSU – Lawrence Dawsey 76-yard pass from Casey Weldon (Richie Andrews kick), 14:03. Florida St 7–0. Drive:
- FSU – Richie Andrews 47-yard field goal, 12:57. Florida St 10–0. Drive:
- FLA – Arden Czyzewski 41-yard field goal, 8:35. Florida St 10–3. Drive:
- FSU - Amp Lee 8-yard pass from Casey Weldon (Richie Andrews kick), 2:36. Florida St 17–3. Drive:

Second quarter

- FLA – Shane Matthews 1-yard run (Arden Czyzewski kick), 5:12. Florida St 17–10. Drive:
- FSU – Edgar Bennett 2-yard run (Richie Andrews kick), 1:11. Florida St 24–10. Drive:

Third quarter

- FSU – Edgar Bennett 2-yard run (Richie Andrews kick), 10:59. Florida St 31–10. Drive:
- FLA – Ernie Mills 14-yard pass from Shane Matthews (kick blocked), 4:03. Florida St 31–16. Drive:
- FSU – Amp Lee 16-yard run (Richie Andrews kick), 3:08. Florida St 38–16. Drive:

Fourth quarter

- FLA – Shane Matthews 1-yard run (pass good), 12:38. Florida St 38–24. Drive:
- FSU – Amp Lee 2-yard run (Richie Andrews kick), 11:56. Florida St 45–24. Drive:
- FLA – Kirk Kirkpatrick 9-yard pass from Shane Matthews (pass failed), 8:50. Florida St 45–30. Drive:

Top passers

- FLA – Shane Matthews – 29/48, 351 yards, 2 TD, 2 INT
- FSU – Casey Weldon – 13/23, 325 yards, 2 TD

Top rushers

- FLA – Errict Rhett – 14 rushes, 57 yards
- FSU – Amp Lee – 26 rushes, 147 yards, 2 TD

Top receivers

- FLA – Ernie Mills – 7 receptions, 126 yards, TD
- FSU – Lawrence Dawsey – 4 receptions, 172 yards, TD

== Roster ==
1990 Florida State Seminoles football team roster
Players
Coaches
Offense

Pos.	#	Name	Class
RB		Clyde Allen
OL		Robbie Baker
WR		Shannon Baker
RB		Edgar Bennett
WR		Lawrence Dawsey
OL		Reggie Dixon
QB		Kenny Felder
WR		Matt Frier
RB		Felix Harris
TE		Warren Hart
OL		Howard Haynes
RB		Sean Jackson
QB	14	Brad Johnson	Jr
TE		Reggie Johnson
WR		Kevin Knox
RB		Amp Lee
OL		Kevin Mancini
RB		Paul Moore
OL		Mike Morris
RB		Chris Parker
RB		Jason Pierce
RB		Maurice Pinckney
TE		Dave Roberts
OL		Robert Stevenson
WR		Eric Turral
QB	11	Casey Weldon	Jr

Defense

Pos.	#	Name	Class
LB		Bryce Abbott
LB		Ken Alexander
CB	27	Terrell Buckley	So
LB		Kirk Carruthers
DL		James Chaney
DB		John Davis
LB		Howard Dinkins
DB		Leon Fowler
LB	97	Reggie Freeman	So
LB	55	Marvin Jones	So
DB		Errol McCorvey
DL		Toddrick McIntosh
LB		Anthony Moss
DL		Henry Ostaszewski
DL		Joe Ostaszewski
DB		Bill Ragans
DL		Troy Sanders
DL		Carl Simpson
DB		John Wyche

Special teams

Pos.	#	Name	Class
K		Richie Andrews
P		Scott McLaren
K		Gerry Thomas
P		John Wimberly

Head coach

- Bobby Bowden

Coordinators/assistant coaches

- Chuck Amato (DL)
- Mickey Andrews (DC)
- Wally Burnham (LB)

Legend

- (C) Team captain
- (S) Suspended
- (I) Ineligible
- Injured
- Redshirt
