= 1990 Pittsburgh Panthers football team =

American college football season

1990 Pittsburgh Panthers football
- Conference: Independent
- Record: 3–7–1
- Head coach: Paul Hackett (1st season)
- Offensive coordinator: Bill Meyers (1st season)
- Offensive scheme: Multiple pro-style
- Defensive coordinator: Fred von Appen (1st season)
- Base defense: Multiple
- Home stadium: Pitt Stadium

1990 Major eastern college football independents records
	Conf.					Overall
Team	W		L		T	W		L		T
No. 11 Penn State $	6	–	0	–	0	9	–	3	–	0
Syracuse	4	–	1	–	1	7	–	4	–	2
Temple	3	–	2	–	0	7	–	4	–	0
West Virginia	2	–	3	–	0	4	–	7	–	0
Pittsburgh	2	–	3	–	1	3	–	7	–	1
Boston College	2	–	4	–	0	4	–	7	–	0
Rutgers	0	–	6	–	0	3	–	8	–	0
$ – Lambert Trophy Winner; Rankings from AP Poll

1990 NCAA Division I-A independents football records
	Conf.			Overall
Team	W	L	T	W		L		T
No. 14 Louisville		–		10	–	1	–	1
No. 3 Miami (FL)		–		10	–	2	–	0
No. 4 Florida State		–		10	–	2	–	0
No. 6 Notre Dame		–		9	–	3	–	0
No. 11 Penn State		–		9	–	3	–	0
Louisiana Tech		–		8	–	3	–	1
Southern Miss		–		8	–	4	–	0
Temple		–		7	–	4	–	0
Syracuse		–		7	–	4	–	2
Army		–		6	–	5	–	0
Northern Illinois		–		6	–	5	–	0
South Carolina		–		6	–	5	–	0
Virginia Tech		–		6	–	5	–	0
East Carolina		–		5	–	6	–	0
Southwestern Louisiana		–		5	–	6	–	0
Navy		–		5	–	6	–	0
Memphis State		–		4	–	6	–	1
Boston College		–		4	–	7	–	0
Tulane		–		4	–	7	–	0
West Virginia		–		4	–	7	–	0
Akron		–		3	–	7	–	1
Pittsburgh		–		3	–	7	–	1
Rutgers		–		3	–	8	–	0
Tulsa		–		3	–	8	–	0
Cincinnati		–		1	–	10	–	0
Rankings from AP Poll

The 1990 Pittsburgh Panthers football team represented the University of Pittsburgh as an independent during the 1990 NCAA Division I-A football season.

== Schedule ==
Date	Time	Opponent	Rank	Site	TV	Result	Attendance	Source
September 1	1:30 p.m.	Ohio	No. 18	Pitt Stadium; Pittsburgh, PA		W 35–3	38,575	
September 8	12:00 p.m.	Boston College	No. 17	Pitt Stadium; Pittsburgh, PA	JP Sports	W 29–6	35,409	
September 15	2:00 p.m.	at No. 14 Oklahoma	No. 13	Oklahoma Memorial Stadium; Norman, OK	CBS	L 10–52	71,117	
September 22	12:00 p.m.	at Syracuse	No. 25	Carrier Dome; Syracuse, NY (rivalry)	JP Sports	T 20–20	47,996	
September 29	1:30 p.m.	West Virginia		Pitt Stadium; Pittsburgh, PA (Backyard Brawl)		L 24–38	54,869	
October 13	1:30 p.m.	Rutgers		Pitt Stadium; Pittsburgh, PA		W 45–21	32,041	
October 20	1:30 p.m.	Louisville		Pitt Stadium; Pittsburgh, PA		L 20–27	34,261	
October 27	8:00 p.m.	No. 3 Notre Dame		Pitt Stadium; Pittsburgh, PA (rivalry)	ESPN	L 21–33	56,500	
November 3	3:30 p.m.	at No. 8 Miami (FL)		Miami Orange Bowl; Miami, FL		L 0–45	50,412	
November 10	12:00 p.m.	Temple		Pitt Stadium; Pittsburgh, PA	JP Sports	L 18–28	16,375	
November 24	1:00 p.m.	at No. 11 Penn State		Beaver Stadium; University Park, PA (rivalry)	CBS	L 17–22	85,180	
Rankings from AP Poll released prior to the game; All times are in Eastern time

== Roster ==
1990 Pittsburgh Panthers football team roster
Players
Coaches
Offense

Pos.	#	Name	Class
OL		Jeff Christy	Jr
TE	41	Dave Moore	Jr
RB	27	Curvin Richards	Sr
WR	80	Olanda Truitt	So
QB	10	Alex Van Pelt	So

Defense

Pos.	#	Name	Class
DL	90	Mark Gunn	Sr
DL	92	Keith Hamilton	So
LB	48	Ricardo McDonald	Jr
DB	5	Louis Riddick	Sr

Special teams

Pos.	#	Name	Class
P	25	Brian Greenfield	Sr

Head coach

- Paul Hackett

Coordinators/assistant coaches

Legend

- (C) Team captain
- (S) Suspended
- (I) Ineligible
- Injured
- Redshirt

== Coaching staff ==
1990 Pittsburgh Panthers football staff
Coaching staff: Paul Hackett – Head coach; Fred von Appen – Assistant head coach/defensive coordinator/defensive line; Bill Meyers – Offensive coordinator/offensive line; Tommie Liggins – Running backs; Chuck Jones – Tight ends; Skip Peete – Wide receivers; Nick Rapone – Secondary; Sal Sunseri – Inside linebackers; Marvin Lewis – Linebackers; Scott O'Brien – Special teams/defensive line	Support staff: Alex Kramer – Administrative assistant; Larry Petroff – Recruiting coordinator; Tom Gibbons – Graduate assistant; Dan Maginnis – Graduate assistant; Michael McCarthy – Graduate assistant; Ralph Radtke – Graduate assistant; Shawn Slocum – Graduate assistant	Strength and conditioning staff: Guy Bennardo – Strength and conditioning Coach

== Team players drafted into the NFL ==
Player	Position	Round	Pick	NFL club
Mark Gunn	Defensive tackle	4	94	New York Jets
Curvin Richards	Running back	4	97	Dallas Cowboys
Olanda Truitt	Wide receiver	5	125	Los Angeles Raiders
Louis Riddick	Defensive back	9	248	San Francisco 49ers
Brian Greenfield	Punter	10	252	Cleveland Browns
