= 1990 Memphis State Tigers football team =

American college football season

1990 Memphis State Tigers football
- Conference: Independent
- Record: 4–6–1
- Head coach: Chuck Stobart (2nd season)
- Defensive coordinator: Joe Lee Dunn (1st season)
- Base defense: 4–3
- Home stadium: Liberty Bowl Memorial Stadium

1990 NCAA Division I-A independents football records
	Conf.			Overall
Team	W	L	T	W		L		T
No. 14 Louisville		–		10	–	1	–	1
No. 3 Miami (FL)		–		10	–	2	–	0
No. 4 Florida State		–		10	–	2	–	0
No. 6 Notre Dame		–		9	–	3	–	0
No. 11 Penn State		–		9	–	3	–	0
Louisiana Tech		–		8	–	3	–	1
Southern Miss		–		8	–	4	–	0
Temple		–		7	–	4	–	0
Syracuse		–		7	–	4	–	2
Army		–		6	–	5	–	0
Northern Illinois		–		6	–	5	–	0
South Carolina		–		6	–	5	–	0
Virginia Tech		–		6	–	5	–	0
East Carolina		–		5	–	6	–	0
Southwestern Louisiana		–		5	–	6	–	0
Navy		–		5	–	6	–	0
Memphis State		–		4	–	6	–	1
Boston College		–		4	–	7	–	0
Tulane		–		4	–	7	–	0
West Virginia		–		4	–	7	–	0
Akron		–		3	–	7	–	1
Pittsburgh		–		3	–	7	–	1
Rutgers		–		3	–	8	–	0
Tulsa		–		3	–	8	–	0
Cincinnati		–		1	–	10	–	0
Rankings from AP Poll

The 1990 Memphis State Tigers football team represented Memphis State University (now known as the University of Memphis) in the 1990 NCAA Division I-A football season. The team was led by head coach Chuck Stobart. The Tigers played their home games at the Liberty Bowl Memorial Stadium.

== Schedule ==
Date	Time	Opponent	Site	Result	Attendance	Source
September 1		Arkansas State	Liberty Bowl Memorial Stadium; Memphis, TN (Paint Bucket Bowl)	T 24–24	50,178	
September 8		at Ole Miss	Vaught–Hemingway Stadium; Oxford, MS (rivalry)	L 21–23	41,300	
September 22		UCF	Liberty Bowl Memorial Stadium; Memphis, TN	W 37–28	21,385	
September 29		at Tulsa	Skelly Stadium; Tulsa, OK	W 22–10	21,072	
October 6		Tulane	Liberty Bowl Memorial Stadium; Memphis, TN	W 21–14	26,759	
October 13		at Louisville	Cardinal Stadium; Louisville, KY (rivalry)	L 17–19	37,423	
October 20		at Southern Miss	M. M. Roberts Stadium; Hattiesburg, MS (Black and Blue Bowl)	L 7–23	24,520	
October 27		Southwestern Louisiana^{†}	Liberty Bowl Memorial Stadium; Memphis, TN	W 20–6	21,628	
November 3	1:30 p.m.	East Carolina	Liberty Bowl Memorial Stadium; Memphis, TN	L 17–24	16,291	
November 10		Mississippi State	Liberty Bowl Memorial Stadium; Memphis, TN	L 23–27	21,105	
November 17	12:00 p.m.	vs. No. 4 Florida State	Florida Citrus Bowl; Orlando, FL	L 3–35	55,190	
^{†}Homecoming; Rankings from AP Poll released prior to the game; All times are in Central time
