= 1990 Virginia Tech Hokies football team =

American college football season

1990 Virginia Tech Hokies football
- Conference: Independent

Ranking
- Coaches: No. 25
- Record: 6–5
- Head coach: Frank Beamer (4th season)
- Offensive coordinator: Steve Marshall (3rd season)
- Offensive scheme: Pro-style
- Defensive coordinator: Mike Clark (3rd season)
- Base defense: 4–4
- Home stadium: Lane Stadium

1990 NCAA Division I-A independents football records
	Conf.			Overall
Team	W	L	T	W		L		T
No. 14 Louisville		–		10	–	1	–	1
No. 3 Miami (FL)		–		10	–	2	–	0
No. 4 Florida State		–		10	–	2	–	0
No. 6 Notre Dame		–		9	–	3	–	0
No. 11 Penn State		–		9	–	3	–	0
Louisiana Tech		–		8	–	3	–	1
Southern Miss		–		8	–	4	–	0
Temple		–		7	–	4	–	0
Syracuse		–		7	–	4	–	2
Army		–		6	–	5	–	0
Northern Illinois		–		6	–	5	–	0
South Carolina		–		6	–	5	–	0
Virginia Tech		–		6	–	5	–	0
East Carolina		–		5	–	6	–	0
Southwestern Louisiana		–		5	–	6	–	0
Navy		–		5	–	6	–	0
Memphis State		–		4	–	6	–	1
Boston College		–		4	–	7	–	0
Tulane		–		4	–	7	–	0
West Virginia		–		4	–	7	–	0
Akron		–		3	–	7	–	1
Pittsburgh		–		3	–	7	–	1
Rutgers		–		3	–	8	–	0
Tulsa		–		3	–	8	–	0
Cincinnati		–		1	–	10	–	0
Rankings from AP Poll

The 1990 Virginia Tech Hokies football team represented Virginia Polytechnic Institute and State University as an independent during the 1990 NCAA Division I-A football season. Led by fourth-year head coach Frank Beamer, the Hokies finished the season with a record of 6–5 and were ranked No. 25 in the final Coaches Poll. The team played its home games at Lane Stadium in Blacksburg, Virginia.

Virginia Tech opened the season with a 20–13 loss at Maryland, committing four turnovers in the defeat. The Hokies earned their first win in Week 2, defeating Bowling Green 21–7 behind Vaughn Hebron’s 165 rushing yards. In Week 3, Tech edged East Carolina 24–23 after blocking a late extra point attempt.

The Hokies then dropped consecutive games, falling 35–24 to South Carolina and 39–28 at No. 2 Florida State despite leading 21–3 early in Tallahassee. Virginia Tech rebounded with a 26–21 victory over West Virginia before losing 31–28 at Temple on a last-minute touchdown. Back-to-back wins over Southern Miss (20–16) and NC State (20–16) pushed the Hokies to 5–4.

In Week 10, Virginia Tech lost 6–3 at eventual national champion Georgia Tech in a defensive struggle. The Hokies closed the season with a decisive 38–13 win over in-state rival No. 17 Virginia, securing their first winning record under Beamer and briefly entering the national rankings.

Over 11 games, Virginia Tech scored 245 points and allowed 227. Quarterback Will Furrer led the team with 1,868 passing yards and 10 touchdowns, while Vaughn Hebron rushed for 765 yards and three scores. Marcus Mickel contributed 34 receptions for 602 yards, and Tony Kennedy added 546 rushing yards. Defensively, the Hokies recorded 28 sacks and 17 interceptions, while special teams produced multiple blocked kicks, foreshadowing the “Beamerball” identity that would define the program in the 1990s.

== Schedule ==
Date	Time	Opponent	Site	TV	Result	Attendance	Source
September 1	12:00 p.m.	at Maryland	Byrd Stadium; College Park, MD	JPS	L 13–20	34,198	
September 8	7:00 p.m.	Bowling Green	Lane Stadium; Blacksburg, VA		W 21–7	32,187	
September 15	7:00 p.m.	at East Carolina	Ficklen Memorial Stadium; Greenville, NC		W 24–23	33,819	
September 22	12:00 p.m.	South Carolina	Lane Stadium; Blacksburg, VA	HTS	L 24–35	41,462	
September 29	7:00 p.m.	at No. 2 Florida State	Doak Campbell Stadium; Tallahassee, FL		L 28–39	60,301	
October 6	1:00 p.m.	West Virginia	Lane Stadium; Blacksburg, VA (rivalry)		W 26–21	51,223	
October 20	1:00 p.m.	at Temple	Veterans Stadium; Philadelphia, PA		L 28–31	25,712	
October 27	1:00 p.m.	Southern Miss	Lane Stadium; Blacksburg, VA		W 20–16	37,462	
November 3	1:00 p.m.	NC State	Lane Stadium; Blacksburg, VA		W 20–16	38,622	
November 10	1:00 p.m.	at No. 7 Georgia Tech	Bobby Dodd Stadium; Atlanta, GA (rivalry)		L 3–6	43,011	
November 24	4:00 p.m.	No. 17 Virginia	Lane Stadium; Blacksburg, VA (rivalry)	ESPN	W 38–13	54,157	
Rankings from AP Poll released prior to the game; All times are in Eastern time

== Game Summaries ==
=== Maryland ===
Team	1	2	3	4	Total
Virginia Tech	3	7	3	0	13
• Maryland	0	10	3	7	20

- Date: September 1
- Location: Byrd Stadium, College Park, MD
- Game start: 12:00 p.m. EST
- Elapsed time: 3:30
- Game attendance: 34,198
- Game weather: Sunny, 82 °F (28 °C), Winds WSW 5 mph (8.0 km/h)
Box Score

Virginia Tech (0–1) opened its 1990 season with a 20–13 loss to Maryland (1–0) on September 1 at Byrd Stadium. The Hokies led 10–7 late in the second quarter but were outgained 371–218 and committed four turnovers.

Tech took a 3–0 lead on a 37-yard field goal by Mickey Thomas at 9:30 of the first quarter. Maryland responded in the second with a 16-yard touchdown pass from Scott Zolak to Frank Wycheck and a 47-yard field goal by Dan DeArmas. Will Furrer connected with John Rivers for a 5-yard touchdown pass at 3:31 to tie the game 10–10.

In the third quarter, DeArmas added a 27-yard field goal and Thomas answered with a 19-yarder to make it 13–13. Maryland sealed the win with a 51-yard touchdown pass from Zolak to Gene Thomas at 1:01 of the fourth quarter.

Virginia Tech totaled 218 yards of offense, including 71 rushing and 147 passing, and recorded 12 first downs. Vaughn Hebron led the ground game with 69 yards on 18 carries, while Furrer completed 13 of 30 passes for 147 yards, one touchdown, and three interceptions. Marcus Mickel caught 5 passes for 37 yards, and Nick Cullen added 3 receptions for 51 yards.

Defensively, the Hokies recorded three sacks and forced four turnovers. Todd Brown had 1.0 sack for 9 yards and intercepted a pass for a 2-yard return. Jimmy Whitten and Rusty Pendleton each added a sack, with Pendleton also forcing a fumble and recording a quarterback hurry. Fumble recoveries were made by Darwin Herdman, Robert Davis, and Anthony Pack. Archie Hopkins led the team with 10 tackles, including 1.0 for loss. Herdman added 8 tackles and 2.0 TFLs. Virginia Tech defenders broke up seven passes, including contributions from Damien Russell, Davis, Brown, Kirk Alexander, Scott Rice, Greg Lassiter, and Darwin Herdman.

On special teams, Mickel returned 3 kickoffs for 57 yards. Chris Baucia averaged 42.4 yards on 9 punts, and Thomas converted both field goal attempts and one extra point.

=== Bowling Green ===
Team	1	2	3	4	Total
Bowling Green	0	7	0	0	7
• Virginia Tech	0	17	7	7	31

- Date: September 8
- Location: Lane Stadium, Blacksburg, VA
- Game start: 7:00 p.m. EST
- Elapsed time: 2:47
- Game attendance: 36,100
- Game weather: Clear, 75 °F (24 °C), Winds N 5 mph (8.0 km/h)
Box Score

Virginia Tech (1–1) earned its first win of the season with a 31–7 victory over Bowling Green (0–2) on September 8, 1990, at Lane Stadium. The Hokies rushed for 262 yards and scored 31 unanswered points after trailing early in the second quarter.

Bowling Green opened the scoring with a 31-yard touchdown pass from Erik White to Mark Szlachcic at 13:06 of the second quarter. Virginia Tech responded with a 32-yard touchdown run by Vaughn Hebron, a 50-yard touchdown run by Hebron, and a 27-yard field goal by Mickey Thomas to take a 17–7 halftime lead.

In the third quarter, Hebron broke free for a 50-yard run to set up a 1-yard touchdown plunge by Tony Kennedy. In the fourth, Rodd Wooten connected with Nick Cullen for a 27-yard touchdown pass to seal the win.

Virginia Tech totaled 335 yards of offense, including 262 rushing and 73 passing, and recorded 18 first downs. Hebron led the ground game with 165 yards and 2 touchdowns on 26 carries, while Kennedy added 47 yards on 12 attempts. Will Furrer completed 7 of 11 passes for 63 yards and an interception, while Wooten went 5 of 10 for 73 yards, a touchdown, and an interception. Cullen caught 2 passes for 36 yards and a score.

Defensively, the Hokies recorded one sack and three pass breakups. Roger Garland had a 9-yard sack, and Damien Russell, Darwin Herdman, and P.J. Preston each broke up a pass.

On special teams, Marcus Mickel returned 3 kickoffs for 72 yards and 2 punts for 24 yards. Chris Baucia averaged 39.0 yards on 4 punts, and Thomas converted a field goal and all four extra points.

=== East Carolina ===
Team	1	2	3	4	Total
• Virginia Tech	0	14	7	3	24
East Carolina	14	3	0	6	23

- Date: September 15
- Location: Ficklen Stadium, Greenville, NC
- Game start: 7:00 p.m. EST
- Elapsed time: 2:55
- Game attendance: 33,810
- Game weather: Clear, 82 °F (28 °C), Winds 5 to 10 mph (8.0 to 16.1 km/h)
Box Score

Virginia Tech (2–1) edged East Carolina (1–2) by a single point in a 24–23 road victory on September 15, 1990. The Hokies overcame a 14-point first-quarter deficit and blocked a late extra point to preserve the win in a preview of what would become called "Beamerball."

East Carolina jumped ahead with two first-quarter touchdowns, including a 1-yard run by Cedric Van Buren and a 2-yard run by David Daniels. Virginia Tech responded in the second quarter with a 10-yard touchdown run by Phil Bryant and a 69-yard touchdown pass from Will Furrer to Tony Kennedy. A 31-yard touchdown pass from Furrer to Bo Campbell in the third quarter gave Tech a 21–17 lead. Mickey Thomas added a 35-yard field goal in the fourth quarter.

Daniels scored again for East Carolina on a 37-yard run with 2:36 remaining, but Jimmy Whitten blocked the extra point attempt to keep Virginia Tech ahead 24–23.

The Hokies totaled 442 yards of offense, including 167 rushing and 275 passing, and recorded 20 first downs. Furrer completed 14 of 19 passes for 237 yards and 2 touchdowns, while Rodd Wooten added 38 yards on 4 completions. Kennedy led with 152 all-purpose yards (68 rushing, 84 receiving), and Vaughn Hebron contributed 141 yards (66 rushing, 75 receiving). Campbell caught 2 passes for 44 yards and a touchdown.

Defensively, Bryan Campbell led the team with 13 tackles, and Al Chamblee added 12. Virginia Tech recorded three sacks: P.J. Preston (8 yards), Anthony Pack (11 yards), and Todd Brown (4 yards). Pack returned an ECU fumble 75 yards in the third quarter.

=== South Carolina ===
Team	1	2	3	4	Total
• South Carolina	0	7	6	22	35
Virginia Tech	7	7	10	0	24

- Date: September 22
- Location: Lane Stadium, Blacksburg, VA
- Game start: 12:09 p.m. EDT
- Elapsed time: 2:58
- Game attendance: 41,462
- Game weather: Clearing, 69 °F (21 °C), Winds NW 10 to 12 mph (16 to 19 km/h)
Box Score

South Carolina rallied in the fourth quarter to defeat Virginia Tech 35–24 at Lane Stadium, improving to 2–1 while the Hokies fell to 2–2. Virginia Tech led 14–0 midway through the second quarter after quarterback Will Furrer threw touchdown passes to Vaughn Hebron (24 yards) and Phil Bryant (3 yards). South Carolina responded with a 1-yard touchdown run by Mike Dingle before halftime.

Dingle added another 1-yard rushing score in the third quarter, though the extra point was blocked. Virginia Tech answered with a 47-yard touchdown pass from Furrer to Hebron and a 22-yard field goal by Mickey Thomas, extending the lead to 24–13.

The Gamecocks dominated the fourth quarter, scoring 22 unanswered points. Bobby Fuller threw touchdown passes to Dingle (8 yards) and Eddie Miller (26 yards), with a successful two-point conversion. After a Hokie fumble, Dingle sealed the win with his third rushing touchdown, an 8-yard run.

Furrer finished 13-of-28 for 196 yards, 3 touchdowns, and 1 interception. Hebron led Tech with 81 receiving yards and 2 touchdowns, adding 37 rushing yards. Bryant contributed 60 total yards and a receiving score. Marcus Mickel totaled 124 return yards (71 kickoff, 38 punt).

Defensively, Virginia Tech recorded 4 sacks for 31 yards, including 2.0 by Todd Brown. The Hokies forced 2 fumbles, recovered one, broke up 3 passes, and blocked an extra point.

Virginia Tech posted 318 total yards (122 rushing, 196 passing) and 16 first downs. South Carolina gained 382 yards and held the ball for nearly 35 minutes. The Hokies were outscored 22–0 in the final quarter.

=== No. 2 Florida State ===
Team	1	2	3	4	Total
Virginia Tech	7	14	7	0	28
• Florida State	3	15	14	7	39

- Date: September 29
- Location: Doak Campbell Stadium, Tallahassee, FL
- Game start: 7:05 p.m. EDT
- Elapsed time: 3:15
- Game attendance: 60,301
- Game weather: Cloudy, rainy, & wet, 71 °F (22 °C), Winds 6 mph (9.7 km/h) E
Box Score

Florida State, ranked #2 in the AP Poll, overcame a 21–3 deficit to defeat Virginia Tech 39–28 in Tallahassee, improving to 4–0 while the Hokies dropped to 2–3.

Virginia Tech surged ahead in the first half behind three touchdowns: Will Furrer threw scoring passes to John Rivers from 4 and 3 yards out, and Tony Kennedy added a 26-yard rushing touchdown. Florida State responded with a 5-yard touchdown run by Amp Lee and a 4-yard touchdown pass from Brad Johnson to Shannon Baker, followed by a successful two-point conversion.

In the third quarter, Johnson connected with Matt Frier for a 16-yard touchdown, but Virginia Tech regained the lead on a 2-yard touchdown pass from Furrer to Vaughn Hebron. Florida State quickly answered when Terrell Buckley returned an interception 53 yards for a touchdown, giving the Seminoles a 32–28 lead. The final blow came in the fourth quarter when Errol McCorvey returned a Virginia Tech fumble 77 yards for a touchdown.

Furrer completed 21 of 37 passes for 194 yards, 3 touchdowns, and 4 interceptions. Hebron totaled 78 rushing yards and a receiving score, while Rivers caught two touchdown passes. Marcus Mickel led Tech with 84 all-purpose yards, and Bo Campbell added a 61-yard reception. Virginia Tech gained 418 total yards (136 rushing, 282 passing) and 22 first downs, but committed 6 turnovers.

Defensively, the Hokies recorded 2 sacks for 11 yards, 3 interceptions (including a 22-yard return by Mark Scott), and 1 fumble recovery. Florida State countered with 3 sacks, 5 interceptions, and 1 fumble return touchdown. The Seminoles posted 420 total yards and held Virginia Tech scoreless in the fourth quarter.

=== West Virginia ===
Team	1	2	3	4	Total
West Virginia	0	14	0	7	21
• Virginia Tech	7	6	6	7	26

- Date: October 6
- Location: Lane Stadium, Blacksburg, VA
- Game start: 1:02 p.m. EDT
- Elapsed time: 3:09
- Game attendance: 51,223
- Game weather: Clear and sunny, 70 °F (21 °C), Winds NW 0 to 5 mph (0.0 to 8.0 km/h)
Box Score

Virginia Tech held off a late West Virginia rally to secure a 26–21 victory at Lane Stadium, improving to 3–3 on the season.

The Hokies opened the scoring in the first quarter with a 78-yard touchdown pass from Will Furrer to Vaughn Hebron. After falling behind 14–7 in the second quarter, Tech responded with two field goals by Mickey Thomas (24 and 32 yards) to trail 14–13 at halftime.

In the third quarter, Tony Kennedy capped a 10-play, 70-yard drive with an 11-yard touchdown run, though the two-point conversion attempt failed. Virginia Tech extended its lead in the fourth quarter when Furrer found Greg Daniels for a 5-yard touchdown pass, making it 26–14. West Virginia answered with a 17-yard touchdown run by Greg Jones, but the Hokies ran out the clock to preserve the win.

Furrer completed 19 of 31 passes for 210 yards, 2 touchdowns, and 1 interception. Hebron totaled 144 all-purpose yards, including 79 receiving yards and a touchdown. Ralph Brown led the rushing attack with 84 yards on 10 carries, while Kennedy added 52 rushing yards and a score. Greg Daniels caught 4 passes for 33 yards and a touchdown.

Virginia Tech amassed 436 total yards (226 rushing, 210 passing) and 20 first downs. The Hokies averaged 6.1 yards per play and converted 6 of 17 third downs. Marcus Mickel and Bo Campbell combined for 70 punt return yards, contributing to Tech's 115 total return yards.

Defensively, the Hokies recorded 2 sacks for 16 yards and broke up 5 passes. Al Chamblee and P.J. Preston each registered a sack, while five different players recorded pass breakups. The defense held West Virginia to 296 total yards and just 3 of 16 on third-down conversions.

=== Temple ===
Team	1	2	3	4	Total
Virginia Tech	14	7	7	0	28
• Temple	10	7	0	14	31

- Date: October 20
- Location: Veterans Stadium, Philadelphia, PA
- Game start: 1:02 p.m. EDT
- Elapsed time: 3:15
- Game attendance: 25,712
- Game weather: Sunny, 54 °F (12 °C), Winds N 6 mph (9.7 km/h)
Box Score

Temple erased an 11-point deficit in the fourth quarter to defeat Virginia Tech 31–28 at Veterans Stadium, dropping the Hokies to 3–4 on the season.

Virginia Tech jumped ahead early with three first-quarter scores: a 31-yard field goal by Bob Wright, a 17-yard touchdown pass from Will Furrer to Greg Daniels, and a 22-yard touchdown run by Furrer himself. Temple responded with a 1-yard touchdown run by Conrad Swanson to close the quarter.

In the second, Furrer found Nick Cullen for a 25-yard touchdown to extend the Hokie lead to 21–10. Temple answered with a 9-yard touchdown run by Scott McNair before halftime. Virginia Tech's final score came in the third quarter on a 24-yard touchdown run by Tony Kennedy, making it 28–17.

Temple mounted a comeback in the fourth quarter. McNair scored again on a 19-yard run, and Matt Baker connected with Kevin McCoy for a 15-yard touchdown pass with 1:51 remaining to take the lead. Virginia Tech's final drive ended with a fumble, sealing the Owls’ win.

Furrer completed 12 of 21 passes for 135 yards and 2 touchdowns, while backup Rodd Wooten added 3 completions for 7 yards. Kennedy led the rushing attack with 64 yards and a touchdown, followed by Ralph Brown with 65 yards. Cullen and Daniels each caught a touchdown pass, and Marcus Mickel led all receivers with 56 yards on 7 catches.

Virginia Tech totaled 339 yards of offense (197 rushing, 142 passing) and 20 first downs. Mickel added 83 all-purpose yards, and the Hokies gained 115 return yards overall. Defensively, Tech recorded 3 interceptions (by Russell, Pendleton, and Pack), 1 fumble recovery, and 1 blocked field goal. Archie Hopkins led the defense with 11 total tackles.

Temple outgained Virginia Tech with 425 total yards and held the ball for over 33 minutes. The Hokies were outscored 14–0 in the final quarter and Mickey Thomas missed two field goal attempts in the second half.

=== Southern Miss ===
Team	1	2	3	4	Total
Southern Miss	0	0	7	9	16
• Virginia Tech	3	17	0	0	20

- Date: October 27
- Location: Lane Stadium, Blacksburg, VA
- Game start: 1:03 p.m. EDT
- Elapsed time: 2:53
- Game attendance: 37,462
- Game weather: Clear and sunny, 47 °F (8 °C), Winds NNE 0 to 5 mph (0.0 to 8.0 km/h)
Box Score

Virginia Tech built a 20–0 lead by halftime and held off a late Southern Miss rally to win 20–16 at Lane Stadium. The Hokies improved to 4–4, while the Golden Eagles dropped to 6–3.

Tech opened the scoring in the first quarter with a 36-yard field goal by Mickey Thomas. In the second quarter, Tony Kennedy ran for a 14-yard touchdown, Thomas added a 26-yard field goal, and Will Furrer threw a 5-yard touchdown pass to Kennedy with 30 seconds left in the half.

Southern Miss responded in the third quarter with a 5-yard touchdown run by Rolando Johnson. In the fourth, Brett Favre connected with Eddie Ray Jackson for an 8-yard touchdown pass, and the Golden Eagles added a safety on the final play to close the gap to four points.

Furrer completed 24 of 34 passes for 247 yards and 1 touchdown. Nick Cullen led all receivers with 13 catches for 170 yards. Kennedy contributed 68 all-purpose yards and scored both Hokie touchdowns. Phil Bryant rushed for 53 yards, and Marcus Mickel added 78 all-purpose yards.

Virginia Tech totaled 446 yards of offense (154 rushing, 292 passing) and 26 first downs. The Hokies held the ball for over 35 minutes and converted 7 of 16 third downs. Defensively, Tech recorded 5 pass breakups, 2 interceptions (by Tyronne Drakeford and Greg Lassiter), and 5 tackles for loss.

Southern Miss gained 315 total yards and committed 2 turnovers. Favre threw for 192 yards and 1 touchdown on 16-of-30 passing. Virginia Tech's defense contained the Golden Eagles until the fourth quarter, when Southern Miss scored 9 points but fell short after a failed final drive.

=== Cincinnati ===
Team	1	2	3	4	Total
• Virginia Tech	7	14	0	7	28
Cincinnati	0	0	7	0	7

- Date: November 3
- Location: Nippert Stadium, Cincinnati, OH
- Game start: 1:00 p.m. EST
- Elapsed time: 2:45
- Game attendance: 15,421
- Game weather: Cloudy, 50 °F (10 °C), Winds W 10 to 15 mph (16 to 24 km/h)
Box Score

Virginia Tech controlled the game from start to finish in a 28–7 road victory over Cincinnati at Nippert Stadium, improving to 5–4 on the season.

The Hokies opened the scoring in the first quarter with a 1-yard touchdown run by Tony Kennedy. In the second quarter, Will Furrer threw a 7-yard touchdown pass to Greg Daniels and later connected with Marcus Mickel for a 14-yard score, giving Tech a 21–0 halftime lead.

Cincinnati's only points came in the third quarter on a 1-yard touchdown run by David Small. Virginia Tech responded in the fourth with a 1-yard touchdown run by Phil Bryant to seal the win.

Furrer completed 17 of 27 passes for 186 yards and 2 touchdowns. Kennedy led the rushing attack with 84 yards and a touchdown on 17 carries. Mickel caught 5 passes for 50 yards and a score, while Daniels added 3 receptions for 34 yards and a touchdown. Bryant contributed 41 rushing yards and a score.

Virginia Tech totaled 366 yards of offense (180 rushing, 186 passing) and 22 first downs. The Hokies converted 8 of 15 third downs and held the ball for over 33 minutes. Mickel added 89 return yards, bringing his all-purpose total to 139.

Defensively, the Hokies recorded 3 sacks for 20 yards and broke up 4 passes. P.J. Preston led the team with 9 tackles, while Todd Brown and Jerome Preston each notched a sack. Virginia Tech held Cincinnati to 239 total yards and just 3 of 13 on third-down conversions.

=== Georgia Tech ===
Team	1	2	3	4	Total
Virginia Tech	0	0	0	3	3
• Georgia Tech	7	7	7	7	28

- Date: November 10
- Location: Bobby Dodd Stadium, Atlanta, GA
- Game start: 1:30 p.m. EST
- Elapsed time: 2:48
- Game attendance: 43,452
- Game weather: Clear, 63 °F (17 °C), Winds NW 5 to 10 mph (8.0 to 16.1 km/h)
Box Score

Georgia Tech remained unbeaten with a dominant 28–3 win over Virginia Tech at Bobby Dodd Stadium, dropping the Hokies to 5–5 on the season. The Yellow Jackets scored in every quarter and held the Hokies without a touchdown, limiting them to just a field goal in the final minutes.

Georgia Tech opened the scoring with a 1-yard touchdown run by William Bell in the first quarter. In the second, quarterback Shawn Jones connected with Emmett Merchant for a 17-yard touchdown pass. The Jackets extended their lead in the third with a 1-yard touchdown run by Jerry Mays, and capped the game in the fourth with a 2-yard touchdown run by Bell, his second of the day.

Virginia Tech's only points came on a 22-yard field goal by Mickey Thomas with 2:58 remaining. The Hokies struggled offensively, committing 4 turnovers and converting just 3 of 14 third downs.

Will Furrer completed 14 of 28 passes for 124 yards and 2 interceptions. Tony Kennedy led the rushing attack with 45 yards on 10 carries. Nick Cullen caught 4 passes for 42 yards, and Marcus Mickel added 3 receptions for 33 yards. Mickel also totaled 94 return yards, bringing his all-purpose total to 127.

Virginia Tech managed 239 total yards (115 rushing, 124 passing) and 13 first downs. Defensively, the Hokies recorded 2 sacks for 14 yards and broke up 3 passes. Tyronne Drakeford led the team with 9 tackles and 1 pass breakup.

Georgia Tech gained 377 total yards and controlled the clock for over 35 minutes. The Yellow Jackets improved to 8–0–1 and continued their march toward a share of the national championship.

=== Virginia ===
Team	1	2	3	4	Total
Virginia Tech	0	0	0	10	10
• Virginia	7	14	7	7	35

- Date: November 17
- Location: Scott Stadium, Charlottesville, VA
- Game start: 1:30 p.m. EST
- Elapsed time: 2:52
- Game attendance: 45,200
- Game weather: Clear, 52 °F (11 °C), Winds W 5 to 10 mph (8.0 to 16.1 km/h)
Box Score

Virginia dominated in-state rival Virginia Tech 35–10 at Scott Stadium, improving to 8–2 while the Hokies fell to 5–6. The Cavaliers scored in every quarter and held the Hokies scoreless until the final period.

Virginia opened the scoring with a 1-yard touchdown run by Terry Kirby in the first quarter. In the second, Kirby added a 2-yard touchdown run and quarterback Matt Blundin connected with Larry Holmes for a 6-yard touchdown pass. Blundin threw another touchdown in the third quarter, a 3-yard strike to Kirby, and capped the scoring in the fourth with a 5-yard touchdown pass to Tyrone Davis.

Virginia Tech's only points came in the fourth quarter. Will Furrer threw a 6-yard touchdown pass to Marcus Mickel, and Mickey Thomas added a 32-yard field goal. The Hokies committed 4 turnovers and were outgained by nearly 200 yards.

Furrer completed 18 of 34 passes for 174 yards, 1 touchdown, and 3 interceptions. Mickel caught 6 passes for 66 yards and a score, adding 88 return yards for 154 all-purpose yards. Tony Kennedy rushed for 53 yards, and Nick Cullen added 4 receptions for 45 yards.

Virginia Tech totaled 289 yards of offense (115 rushing, 174 passing) and 17 first downs. The Hokies converted 6 of 16 third downs but committed 2 fumbles and 3 interceptions. Defensively, Tech recorded 2 sacks and 3 pass breakups.

Virginia posted 474 total yards and held the ball for over 36 minutes. Blundin threw for 3 touchdowns and 226 yards, while Kirby rushed for 2 scores and caught another. The Cavaliers scored touchdowns on five of their first eight possessions.

== Roster ==
1990 Virginia Tech Hokies football team roster
Players
Coaches
Offense

Pos.	#	Name	Class
OT	69	Eugene Chung	Jr
QB	2	Will Furrer	Jr
C	73	Jim Pyne	Fr

Defense

Pos.	#	Name	Class
DE	97	Al Chamblee	Sr
CB	22	Tyronne Drakeford	Fr
CB	35	John Granby	Jr

Special teams

Pos.	#	Name	Class

Head coach

- Frank Beamer

Coordinators/assistant coaches

Legend

- (C) Team captain
- (S) Suspended
- (I) Ineligible
- Injured
- Redshirt
