= 1990 Southern Miss Golden Eagles football team =

American college football season

1990 Southern Miss Golden Eagles football

All-American Bowl, L 27–31 vs. NC State
- Conference: Independent
- Record: 8–4
- Head coach: Curley Hallman (3rd season; regular season); Jeff Bower (interim; bowl game)
- Offensive coordinator: Mark McHale (1st season)
- Offensive scheme: West Coast
- Defensive coordinator: Michael Bugar (1st season)
- Base defense: 4–3
- Home stadium: M. M. Roberts Stadium

1990 NCAA Division I-A independents football records
	Conf.			Overall
Team	W	L	T	W		L		T
No. 14 Louisville		–		10	–	1	–	1
No. 3 Miami (FL)		–		10	–	2	–	0
No. 4 Florida State		–		10	–	2	–	0
No. 6 Notre Dame		–		9	–	3	–	0
No. 11 Penn State		–		9	–	3	–	0
Louisiana Tech		–		8	–	3	–	1
Southern Miss		–		8	–	4	–	0
Temple		–		7	–	4	–	0
Syracuse		–		7	–	4	–	2
Army		–		6	–	5	–	0
Northern Illinois		–		6	–	5	–	0
South Carolina		–		6	–	5	–	0
Virginia Tech		–		6	–	5	–	0
East Carolina		–		5	–	6	–	0
Southwestern Louisiana		–		5	–	6	–	0
Navy		–		5	–	6	–	0
Memphis State		–		4	–	6	–	1
Boston College		–		4	–	7	–	0
Tulane		–		4	–	7	–	0
West Virginia		–		4	–	7	–	0
Akron		–		3	–	7	–	1
Pittsburgh		–		3	–	7	–	1
Rutgers		–		3	–	8	–	0
Tulsa		–		3	–	8	–	0
Cincinnati		–		1	–	10	–	0
Rankings from AP Poll

The 1990 Southern Miss Golden Eagles football team was an American football team that represented the University of Southern Mississippi as an independent during the 1990 NCAA Division I-A football season. In their third year under head coach Curley Hallman, the team compiled an 8–4 record and lost the 1990 All-American Bowl. The Golden Eagles had one of the biggest upsets of the college football season when they beat the Alabama Crimson Tide by a score of 27–24. Another upset followed later in the season when the Golden Eagles beat the Auburn Tigers by a score of 13–12.

== Schedule ==
Date	Opponent	Rank	Site	Result	Attendance	Source
September 1	Delta State		M. M. Roberts Stadium; Hattiesburg, MS	W 12–0	17,590	
September 8	at No. 13 Alabama		Legion Field; Birmingham, AL	W 27–24	75,962	
September 15	at Georgia		Sanford Stadium; Athens, GA	L 17–18	79,812	
September 22	at Mississippi State		Scott Field; Starkville, MS	L 10–13	40,115	
September 29	Louisville		M. M. Roberts Stadium; Hattiesburg, MS	W 25–13	20,545	
October 6	at East Carolina		Ficklen Memorial Stadium; Greenville, NC	W 16–7	31,305	
October 13	at Tulane		Louisiana Superdome; New Orleans, LA (rivalry)	W 20–14	26,662	
October 20	Memphis State^{†}		M. M. Roberts Stadium; Hattiesburg, MS (rivalry)	W 23–7	24,520	
October 27	at Virginia Tech		Lane Stadium; Blacksburg, VA	L 16–20	37,462	
November 3	at Southwestern Louisiana		Cajun Field; Lafayette, LA	W 14–13	17,860	
November 10	at No. 15 Auburn		Jordan–Hare Stadium; Auburn, AL	W 13–12	85,214	
December 28	vs. NC State	No. 23	Legion Field; Birmingham, AL (All-American Bowl)	L 27–31	44,000	
^{†}Homecoming; Rankings from AP Poll released prior to the game

== Roster ==
1990 Southern Miss Golden Eagles football team roster
Players
Coaches
Offense

Pos.	#	Name	Class
QB	4	Brett Favre	Sr
WR		Michael Jackson	Sr
RG	56	Chafan Marsh	Jr
RT	78	Chris Ryals	Jr

Defense

Pos.	#	Name	Class
DB		Perry Carter	Fr

Special teams

Pos.	#	Name	Class
K	32	Chuck Davis

Head coach

- Curley Hallman

Coordinators/assistant coaches

Legend

- (C) Team captain
- (S) Suspended
- (I) Ineligible
- Injured
- Redshirt

== Team players in the NFL ==
Player	Position	Round	Pick	NFL club
Brett Favre	Quarterback	2	33	Atlanta Falcons
Michael Jackson	Wide receiver	6	141	Cleveland Browns
Simmie Carter	Defensive back	7	195	New York Giants
