= 1990 Temple Owls football team =

American college football season

1990 Temple Owls football
- Conference: Independent
- Record: 7–4
- Head coach: Jerry Berndt (2nd season)
- Home stadium: Veterans Stadium

1990 Major eastern college football independents records
	Conf.					Overall
Team	W		L		T	W		L		T
No. 11 Penn State $	6	–	0	–	0	9	–	3	–	0
Syracuse	4	–	1	–	1	7	–	4	–	2
Temple	3	–	2	–	0	7	–	4	–	0
West Virginia	2	–	3	–	0	4	–	7	–	0
Pittsburgh	2	–	3	–	1	3	–	7	–	1
Boston College	2	–	4	–	0	4	–	7	–	0
Rutgers	0	–	6	–	0	3	–	8	–	0
$ – Lambert Trophy Winner; Rankings from AP Poll

1990 NCAA Division I-A independents football records
	Conf.			Overall
Team	W	L	T	W		L		T
No. 14 Louisville		–		10	–	1	–	1
No. 3 Miami (FL)		–		10	–	2	–	0
No. 4 Florida State		–		10	–	2	–	0
No. 6 Notre Dame		–		9	–	3	–	0
No. 11 Penn State		–		9	–	3	–	0
Louisiana Tech		–		8	–	3	–	1
Southern Miss		–		8	–	4	–	0
Temple		–		7	–	4	–	0
Syracuse		–		7	–	4	–	2
Army		–		6	–	5	–	0
Northern Illinois		–		6	–	5	–	0
South Carolina		–		6	–	5	–	0
Virginia Tech		–		6	–	5	–	0
East Carolina		–		5	–	6	–	0
Southwestern Louisiana		–		5	–	6	–	0
Navy		–		5	–	6	–	0
Memphis State		–		4	–	6	–	1
Boston College		–		4	–	7	–	0
Tulane		–		4	–	7	–	0
West Virginia		–		4	–	7	–	0
Akron		–		3	–	7	–	1
Pittsburgh		–		3	–	7	–	1
Rutgers		–		3	–	8	–	0
Tulsa		–		3	–	8	–	0
Cincinnati		–		1	–	10	–	0
Rankings from AP Poll

The 1990 Temple Owls football team was an American football team that represented Temple University as an independent during the 1990 NCAA Division I-A football season. In its second season under head coach Jerry Berndt, the team compiled a 7–4 record and was outscored by a total of 269 to 261. The team played its home games at Veterans Stadium in Philadelphia.

The team's statistical leaders included Matt Baker with 1,462 passing yards, Scott McNair with 623 rushing yards, Rich Drayton with 564 receiving yards, and placekicker Bob Wright with 85 points scored.

== Schedule ==
Date	Opponent	Site	Result	Attendance	Source
September 1	at Wyoming	War Memorial Stadium; Laramie, WY	L 23–38	17,654	
September 8	at Syracuse	Carrier Dome; Syracuse, NY	L 9–19	38,925	
September 15	Austin Peay	Veterans Stadium; Philadelphia, PA	W 28–0	24,785	
September 22	at Wisconsin	Camp Randall Stadium; Madison, WI	W 24–18	41,817	
October 6	at Penn State	Beaver Stadium; University Park, PA	L 10–48	85,874	
October 20	Virginia Tech	Veterans Stadium; Philadelphia, PA	W 31–28	25,712	
October 27	East Carolina^{†}	Veterans Stadium; Philadelphia, PA	W 30–27	24,612	
November 3	at No. 11 Tennessee	Neyland Stadium; Knoxville, TN	L 20–41	93,898	
November 10	at Pittsburgh	Pitt Stadium; Pittsburgh, PA	W 28–18	16,375	
November 17	Rutgers	Veterans Stadium; Philadelphia, PA	W 29–22	16,911	
November 24	at Boston College	Alumni Stadium; Chestnut Hill, MA	W 29–10	21,067	
^{†}Homecoming; Rankings from AP Poll released prior to the game
