= 1990 West Virginia Mountaineers football team =

American college football season

1990 West Virginia Mountaineers football
- Conference: Independent
- Record: 4–7
- Head coach: Don Nehlen (11th season)
- Home stadium: Mountaineer Field

1990 Major eastern college football independents records
	Conf.					Overall
Team	W		L		T	W		L		T
No. 11 Penn State $	6	–	0	–	0	9	–	3	–	0
Syracuse	4	–	1	–	1	7	–	4	–	2
Temple	3	–	2	–	0	7	–	4	–	0
West Virginia	2	–	3	–	0	4	–	7	–	0
Pittsburgh	2	–	3	–	1	3	–	7	–	1
Boston College	2	–	4	–	0	4	–	7	–	0
Rutgers	0	–	6	–	0	3	–	8	–	0
$ – Lambert Trophy Winner; Rankings from AP Poll

1990 NCAA Division I-A independents football records
	Conf.			Overall
Team	W	L	T	W		L		T
No. 14 Louisville		–		10	–	1	–	1
No. 3 Miami (FL)		–		10	–	2	–	0
No. 4 Florida State		–		10	–	2	–	0
No. 6 Notre Dame		–		9	–	3	–	0
No. 11 Penn State		–		9	–	3	–	0
Louisiana Tech		–		8	–	3	–	1
Southern Miss		–		8	–	4	–	0
Temple		–		7	–	4	–	0
Syracuse		–		7	–	4	–	2
Army		–		6	–	5	–	0
Northern Illinois		–		6	–	5	–	0
South Carolina		–		6	–	5	–	0
Virginia Tech		–		6	–	5	–	0
East Carolina		–		5	–	6	–	0
Southwestern Louisiana		–		5	–	6	–	0
Navy		–		5	–	6	–	0
Memphis State		–		4	–	6	–	1
Boston College		–		4	–	7	–	0
Tulane		–		4	–	7	–	0
West Virginia		–		4	–	7	–	0
Akron		–		3	–	7	–	1
Pittsburgh		–		3	–	7	–	1
Rutgers		–		3	–	8	–	0
Tulsa		–		3	–	8	–	0
Cincinnati		–		1	–	10	–	0
Rankings from AP Poll

The 1990 West Virginia Mountaineers football team represented West Virginia University as an independent during the 1990 NCAA Division I-A football season. Led by 11th-year head coach Don Nehlen, the Mountaineers compiled a record of 4–7. West Virginia played home games at Mountaineer Field in Morgantown, West Virginia.

== Schedule ==
Date	Time	Opponent	Rank	Site	TV	Result	Attendance	Source
September 1	1:00 p.m.	Kent State	No. 25	Mountaineer Field; Morgantown, WV		W 35–24	52,346	
September 8	1:00 p.m.	Maryland	No. 25	Mountaineer Field; Morgantown, WV (rivalry)		L 10–14	64,950	
September 22	1:00 p.m.	Louisville		Mountaineer Field; Morgantown, WV		L 7–9	61,933	
September 29	1:30 p.m.	at Pittsburgh		Pitt Stadium; Pittsburgh, PA (Backyard Brawl)		W 38–24	54,689	
October 6	1:00 p.m.	at Virginia Tech		Lane Stadium; Blacksburg, VA (rivalry)		L 21–26	51,223	
October 13	1:00 p.m.	Cincinnati		Mountaineer Field; Morgantown, WV		W 28–20	46,515	
October 27	1:00 p.m.	Boston College		Mountaineer Field; Morgantown, WV		L 14–27	56,685	
November 3	1:00 p.m.	No. 24 Penn State		Mountaineer Field; Morgantown, WV (rivalry)		L 19–31	66,461	
November 10	12:00 p.m.	at Rutgers		Giants Stadium; East Rutherford, NJ		W 28–3	11,117	
November 17	12:00 p.m.	Syracuse		Mountaineer Field; Morgantown, WV (rivalry)	JPS	L 7–31	44,669	
November 22	8:00 p.m.	at South Carolina		Williams–Brice Stadium; Columbia, SC	ESPN	L 10–29	64,251	
Rankings from AP Poll released prior to the game; All times are in Eastern time

== Roster ==
1990 West Virginia Mountaineers football team roster
Players
Coaches
Offense

Pos.	#	Name	Class
WR	5	Ed Hill	Fr
QB	7	Greg Jones	Sr
QB	13	Jed Drenning	So
QB	14	Darren Studstill	Fr
RB	35	Jim West	Fr
RB	42	Adrian Murrell	So
G, C	77	Mike Compton	So
OT	78	Rich Braham	Fr
WR	88	James Jett	So

Defense

Pos.	#	Name	Class
LB	4	Steve Grant	Jr
DB	11	Darrell Whitmore	Jr

Special teams

Pos.	#	Name	Class

Head coach

- Don Nehlen

Coordinators/assistant coaches

Legend

- (C) Team captain
- (S) Suspended
- (I) Ineligible
- Injured
- Redshirt
