= 1990 Cincinnati Bearcats football team =

American college football season

1990 Cincinnati Bearcats football
- Conference: Independent
- Record: 1–10
- Head coach: Tim Murphy (2nd season)
- Defensive coordinator: John Lovett (2nd season)
- Home stadium: Riverfront Stadium

1990 NCAA Division I-A independents football records
	Conf.			Overall
Team	W	L	T	W		L		T
No. 14 Louisville		–		10	–	1	–	1
No. 3 Miami (FL)		–		10	–	2	–	0
No. 4 Florida State		–		10	–	2	–	0
No. 6 Notre Dame		–		9	–	3	–	0
No. 11 Penn State		–		9	–	3	–	0
Louisiana Tech		–		8	–	3	–	1
Southern Miss		–		8	–	4	–	0
Temple		–		7	–	4	–	0
Syracuse		–		7	–	4	–	2
Army		–		6	–	5	–	0
Northern Illinois		–		6	–	5	–	0
South Carolina		–		6	–	5	–	0
Virginia Tech		–		6	–	5	–	0
East Carolina		–		5	–	6	–	0
Southwestern Louisiana		–		5	–	6	–	0
Navy		–		5	–	6	–	0
Memphis State		–		4	–	6	–	1
Boston College		–		4	–	7	–	0
Tulane		–		4	–	7	–	0
West Virginia		–		4	–	7	–	0
Akron		–		3	–	7	–	1
Pittsburgh		–		3	–	7	–	1
Rutgers		–		3	–	8	–	0
Tulsa		–		3	–	8	–	0
Cincinnati		–		1	–	10	–	0
Rankings from AP Poll

The 1990 Cincinnati Bearcats football team represented the University of Cincinnati during the 1990 NCAA Division I-A football season. The Bearcats, led by head coach Tim Murphy, participated as independent and played their home games at Riverfront Stadium, as Nippert Stadium was undergoing renovations.

== Schedule ==
Date	Opponent	Site	Result	Attendance	Source
September 2	Bowling Green	Riverfront Stadium; Cincinnati, OH	L 20–34	6,563	
September 8	at Central Michigan	Kelly/Shorts Stadium; Mount Pleasant, MI	L 0–34	17,126	
September 15	at Iowa	Kinnick Stadium; Iowa City, IA	L 10–63	66,700	
September 22	Miami (OH)	Riverfront Stadium; Cincinnati, OH (Victory Bell)	L 12–16	9,794	
September 29	at Kent State	Dix Stadium; Kent, OH	W 27–14	12,000	
October 13	at West Virginia	Mountaineer Field; Morgantown, WV	L 20–28	46,515	
October 20	at East Carolina	Ficklen Memorial Stadium; Greenville, NC	L 32–56	27,380	
October 27	at Tulane	Louisiana Superdome; New Orleans, LA	L 7–49	21,548	
November 3	No. 25 Louisville	Riverfront Stadium; Cincinnati, OH (The Keg of Nails)	L 16–41	23,575	
November 10	at No. 12 Florida State	Doak Campbell Stadium; Tallahassee, FL	L 21–70	59,678	
November 17	at Alabama	Legion Field; Birmingham, AL	L 7–45	71,327	
Rankings from AP Poll released prior to the game

== Roster ==
1990 Cincinnati Bearcats football team roster
Players
Coaches
Offense

Pos.	#	Name	Class
QB	19	Paul Anderson	Fr
G	71	John Arena	Jr
WR	1	Damon Bryant	So
WR	84	Ron Cox	So
FB	41	Doug Hoog	Jr
QB	12	Jeff Stofa	Fr

Defense

Pos.	#	Name	Class
CB	6	Jocelyn Borgella	Fr
LB	47	Scott Brown	So
LB	49	Nate Dingle	Fr
DT	95	Ronnie Dixon	So
S	22	Jeff Oliver	Jr
LB	54	Mick Schell	Sr
LB	8	Brian Schipani	So
DT	93	John Thornton	Sr

Special teams

Pos.	#	Name	Class
P	4	Jeff Jones	Sr

Head coach

- Tim Murphy

Coordinators/assistant coaches

Legend

- (C) Team captain
- (S) Suspended
- (I) Ineligible
- Injured
- Redshirt
