= 1990 Syracuse Orangemen football team =

American college football season

1990 Syracuse Orangemen football

Aloha Bowl champion

Aloha Bowl, W 28–0 vs. Arizona
- Conference: Independent

Ranking
- Coaches: No. 21
- Record: 7–4–2
- Head coach: Dick MacPherson (10th season)
- Offensive coordinator: George DeLeone (4th season)
- Captains: John Flannery; Duane Kinnon; Gary McCummings; Rob Thomson
- Home stadium: Carrier Dome

1990 Major eastern college football independents records
	Conf.					Overall
Team	W		L		T	W		L		T
No. 11 Penn State $	6	–	0	–	0	9	–	3	–	0
Syracuse	4	–	1	–	1	7	–	4	–	2
Temple	3	–	2	–	0	7	–	4	–	0
West Virginia	2	–	3	–	0	4	–	7	–	0
Pittsburgh	2	–	3	–	1	3	–	7	–	1
Boston College	2	–	4	–	0	4	–	7	–	0
Rutgers	0	–	6	–	0	3	–	8	–	0
$ – Lambert Trophy Winner; Rankings from AP Poll

1990 NCAA Division I-A independents football records
	Conf.			Overall
Team	W	L	T	W		L		T
No. 14 Louisville		–		10	–	1	–	1
No. 3 Miami (FL)		–		10	–	2	–	0
No. 4 Florida State		–		10	–	2	–	0
No. 6 Notre Dame		–		9	–	3	–	0
No. 11 Penn State		–		9	–	3	–	0
Louisiana Tech		–		8	–	3	–	1
Southern Miss		–		8	–	4	–	0
Temple		–		7	–	4	–	0
Syracuse		–		7	–	4	–	2
Army		–		6	–	5	–	0
Northern Illinois		–		6	–	5	–	0
South Carolina		–		6	–	5	–	0
Virginia Tech		–		6	–	5	–	0
East Carolina		–		5	–	6	–	0
Southwestern Louisiana		–		5	–	6	–	0
Navy		–		5	–	6	–	0
Memphis State		–		4	–	6	–	1
Boston College		–		4	–	7	–	0
Tulane		–		4	–	7	–	0
West Virginia		–		4	–	7	–	0
Akron		–		3	–	7	–	1
Pittsburgh		–		3	–	7	–	1
Rutgers		–		3	–	8	–	0
Tulsa		–		3	–	8	–	0
Cincinnati		–		1	–	10	–	0
Rankings from AP Poll

The 1990 Syracuse Orangemen football team represented Syracuse University as an independent during the 1990 NCAA Division I-A football season. Led by Dick MacPherson in his tenth and final season as head coach, the Orangemen compiled a record of 7–4–2. Syracuse was invited to the Aloha Bowl, where the Orangemen defeated Arizona. The team played home games at the Carrier Dome in Syracuse, New York.

This season marked the end of two eras for Syracuse football. MacPherson left after ten season to become head coach for the New England Patriots of the National Football League. 1990 was also the final season that Syracuse competed as an independent. In 1991, the Big East Conference, of which Syracuse was a founding member, began sponsoring football competition.

== Schedule ==
Date	Time	Opponent	Site	TV	Result	Attendance	Source
August 31	8:00 pm	vs. No. 9 USC	Giants Stadium; East Rutherford, NJ (Kickoff Classic)	Raycom	L 16–34	57,293	
September 8	7:30 pm	Temple	Carrier Dome; Syracuse, NY		W 19–9	38,925	
September 15	7:30 pm	No. 19 Michigan State	Carrier Dome; Syracuse, NY	ESPN	T 23–23	49,822	
September 22	12:30 pm	No. 25 Pittsburgh	Carrier Dome; Syracuse, NY (rivalry)	JPS	T 20–20	47,996	
October 6	7:00 pm	at Vanderbilt	Vanderbilt Stadium; Nashville, TN		W 49–14	30,037	
October 13	2:00 pm	at Penn State	Beaver Stadium; University Park, PA (rivalry)	CBS	L 21–27	86,002	
October 20	12:00 pm	Rutgers	Carrier Dome; Syracuse, NY	JPS	W 42–0	49,521	
October 27	12:00 pm	at Army	Michie Stadium; West Point, NY	JPS	W 26–14	41,153	
November 3	12:00 pm	at Boston College	Alumni Stadium; Chestnut Hill, MA	JPS	W 35–6	32,213	
November 10	1:30 pm	Tulane	Carrier Dome; Syracuse, NY		L 24–26	48,488	
November 17	12:00 pm	at West Virginia	Mountaineer Field; Morgantown, WV (rivalry)	JPS	W 31–7	44,669	
November 24	7:30 pm	at No. 2 Miami (FL)	Miami Orange Bowl; Miami, FL	ESPN	L 7–33	66,196	
December 25	3:30 pm	vs. Arizona	Aloha Stadium; Halawa, HI (Aloha Bowl)	ABC	W 28–0	14,185	
Rankings from AP Poll released prior to the game; All times are in Eastern time

== Roster ==
1990 Syracuse Orangemen football team roster
Players
Coaches
Offense

Pos.	#	Name	Class
WR	7	Rob Carpenter	Jr
C	71	Dan Erickson	Sr
WR	82	Kerry Ferrell	So
C	53	John Flannery	Sr
TE	84	Chris Gedney	So
QB	5	Marvin Graves	So
WR	45	Qadry Ismail	So

Defense

Pos.	#	Name	Class
DB	9	Dwayne Joseph	Fr
LB	52	Glen Young	So

Special teams

Pos.	#	Name	Class
P	4	Pat O'Neill	Fr

Head coach

- Dick MacPherson

Coordinators/assistant coaches

- Lou Anarumo
  (Graduate assistant / assistant defensive backs)
- Andy Rondeau
  (Student assistant)

Legend

- (C) Team captain
- (S) Suspended
- (I) Ineligible
- Injured
- Redshirt
