= 1990 Tulsa Golden Hurricane football team =

American college football season

1990 Tulsa Golden Hurricane football
- Conference: Independent
- Record: 3–8
- Head coach: David Rader (3rd season)
- Home stadium: Skelly Stadium

1990 NCAA Division I-A independents football records
	Conf.			Overall
Team	W	L	T	W		L		T
No. 14 Louisville		–		10	–	1	–	1
No. 3 Miami (FL)		–		10	–	2	–	0
No. 4 Florida State		–		10	–	2	–	0
No. 6 Notre Dame		–		9	–	3	–	0
No. 11 Penn State		–		9	–	3	–	0
Louisiana Tech		–		8	–	3	–	1
Southern Miss		–		8	–	4	–	0
Temple		–		7	–	4	–	0
Syracuse		–		7	–	4	–	2
Army		–		6	–	5	–	0
Northern Illinois		–		6	–	5	–	0
South Carolina		–		6	–	5	–	0
Virginia Tech		–		6	–	5	–	0
East Carolina		–		5	–	6	–	0
Southwestern Louisiana		–		5	–	6	–	0
Navy		–		5	–	6	–	0
Memphis State		–		4	–	6	–	1
Boston College		–		4	–	7	–	0
Tulane		–		4	–	7	–	0
West Virginia		–		4	–	7	–	0
Akron		–		3	–	7	–	1
Pittsburgh		–		3	–	7	–	1
Rutgers		–		3	–	8	–	0
Tulsa		–		3	–	8	–	0
Cincinnati		–		1	–	10	–	0
Rankings from AP Poll

The 1990 Tulsa Golden Hurricane football team represented the University of Tulsa as an independent during the 1990 NCAA Division I-A football season. In their third year under head coach David Rader, the Golden Hurricane compiled a 3–8 record. The team's statistical leaders included quarterback Gus Frerotte with 1,066 passing yards, Chris Hughley with 700 rushing yards, and Frank Cassano with 464 receiving yards.

== Schedule ==
Date	Opponent	Site	Result	Attendance	Source
September 1	at Oklahoma State	Lewis Field; Stillwater, OK (rivalry)	L 3–10	41,200	
September 8	Southwest Missouri State	Skelly Stadium; Tulsa, OK	W 41–28	22,590	
September 15	at No. 15 Arkansas	Razorback Stadium; Fayetteville, AR	L 3–28	50,118	
September 22	at No. 11 Oklahoma	Oklahoma Memorial Stadium; Norman, OK	L 10–52	70,235	
September 29	Memphis State^{†}	Skelly Stadium; Tulsa, OK	L 10–22	21,072	
October 6	at Louisville	Cardinal Stadium; Louisville, KY	L 14–38	36,692	
October 13	Louisiana Tech	Skelly Stadium; Tulsa, OK	L 21–35	17,658	
October 20	Southwestern Louisiana	Skelly Stadium; Tulsa, OK	L 13–25	18,019	
October 27	at New Mexico State	Aggie Memorial Stadium; Las Cruces, NM	W 35–10	17,972	
November 10	at Colorado State	Hughes Stadium; Fort Collins, CO	L 13–31	25,710	
November 17	Montana State	Skelly Stadium; Tulsa, OK	W 20–2	40,248	
^{†}Homecoming; Rankings from AP Poll released prior to the game

== Roster ==
1990 Tulsa Golden Hurricane football team roster
Players
Coaches
Offense

Pos.	#	Name	Class
QB	9	Gus Frerotte	Fr
OT	55	Jerry Ostroski	Jr
QB	11	T. J. Rubley	Jr

Defense

Pos.	#	Name	Class
LB	24	Barry Minter	So
LB	97	Tracy Scroggins	Jr

Special teams

Pos.	#	Name	Class

Head coach

- David Rader

Coordinators/assistant coaches

Legend

- (C) Team captain
- (S) Suspended
- (I) Ineligible
- Injured
- Redshirt
