= 1990 East Carolina Pirates football team =

American college football season

1990 East Carolina Pirates football
- Conference: Independent
- Record: 5–6
- Head coach: Bill Lewis (2nd season)
- Offensive coordinator: Steve Logan (1st season)
- Offensive scheme: Pro-style
- Base defense: 4–2–5
- Home stadium: Ficklen Memorial Stadium

1990 NCAA Division I-A independents football records
	Conf.			Overall
Team	W	L	T	W		L		T
No. 14 Louisville		–		10	–	1	–	1
No. 3 Miami (FL)		–		10	–	2	–	0
No. 4 Florida State		–		10	–	2	–	0
No. 6 Notre Dame		–		9	–	3	–	0
No. 11 Penn State		–		9	–	3	–	0
Louisiana Tech		–		8	–	3	–	1
Southern Miss		–		8	–	4	–	0
Temple		–		7	–	4	–	0
Syracuse		–		7	–	4	–	2
Army		–		6	–	5	–	0
Northern Illinois		–		6	–	5	–	0
South Carolina		–		6	–	5	–	0
Virginia Tech		–		6	–	5	–	0
East Carolina		–		5	–	6	–	0
Southwestern Louisiana		–		5	–	6	–	0
Navy		–		5	–	6	–	0
Memphis State		–		4	–	6	–	1
Boston College		–		4	–	7	–	0
Tulane		–		4	–	7	–	0
West Virginia		–		4	–	7	–	0
Akron		–		3	–	7	–	1
Pittsburgh		–		3	–	7	–	1
Rutgers		–		3	–	8	–	0
Tulsa		–		3	–	8	–	0
Cincinnati		–		1	–	10	–	0
Rankings from AP Poll

The 1990 East Carolina Pirates football team was an American football team that represented East Carolina University as an independent during the 1990 NCAA Division I-A football season. In their second season under head coach Bill Lewis, the team compiled a 5–6 record.

== Schedule ==
Date	Time	Opponent	Site	TV	Result	Attendance	Source
September 1	7:00 pm	Louisiana Tech	Ficklen Memorial Stadium; Greenville, NC		W 27–17	30,690	
September 8	7:00 pm	at No. 3 Florida State	Doak Campbell Stadium; Tallahassee, FL	WITN	L 24–45	61,983	
September 15	7:00 pm	Virginia Tech	Ficklen Memorial Stadium; Greenville, NC		L 23–24	33,810	
September 22	8:00 pm	at Southwestern Louisiana	Cajun Field; Lafayette, LA		W 20–10	19,524	
September 29	1:00 pm	at Georgia	Sanford Stadium; Athens, GA		L 15–19	77,019	
October 6	1:30 pm	Southern Miss	Ficklen Memorial Stadium; Greenville, NC		L 7–16	31,305	
October 13	12:00 pm	at South Carolina	Williams–Brice Stadium; Columbia, SC	JPS	L 7–37	62,000	
October 20	2:00 pm	Cincinnati^{†}	Ficklen Memorial Stadium; Greenville, NC		W 56–32	27,380	
October 27	1:00 pm	at Temple	Veterans Stadium; Philadelphia, PA		L 27–30	24,612	
November 3	2:30 pm	Memphis State	Liberty Bowl; Memphis, TN		W 24–17	16,291	
November 10	1:30 pm	Northern Illinois	Ficklen Memorial Stadium; Greenville, NC		W 24–20	20,100	
^{†}Homecoming; Rankings from AP Poll released prior to the game; All times are in Eastern time

== Roster ==
1990 East Carolina Pirates football team roster
Players
Coaches
Offense

Pos.	#	Name	Class
OL		David Blackwell	Fr
TE	88	Carlester Crumpler	Fr

Defense

Pos.	#	Name	Class

Special teams

Pos.	#	Name	Class

Head coach

- Bill Lewis

Coordinators/assistant coaches

Legend

- (C) Team captain
- (S) Suspended
- (I) Ineligible
- Injured
- Redshirt
