= 1990 Army Cadets football team =

American college football season

1990 Army Cadets football
- Conference: Independent
- Record: 6–5
- Head coach: Jim Young (8th season)
- Offensive coordinator: Greg Gregory (2nd as OC; 9th overall season)
- Offensive scheme: Triple option
- Defensive coordinator: Bob Sutton (8th season)
- Base defense: 4–3
- Captains: Mike Mayweather; John Robb
- Home stadium: Michie Stadium

1990 NCAA Division I-A independents football records
| | Conf. | | | Overall |
| Team | W | L | T | W | | L | | T |
|---|---|---|---|---|---|---|---|---|
| No. 14 Louisville | | – | | 10 | – | 1 | – | 1 |
| No. 3 Miami (FL) | | – | | 10 | – | 2 | – | 0 |
| No. 4 Florida State | | – | | 10 | – | 2 | – | 0 |
| No. 6 Notre Dame | | – | | 9 | – | 3 | – | 0 |
| No. 11 Penn State | | – | | 9 | – | 3 | – | 0 |
| Louisiana Tech | | – | | 8 | – | 3 | – | 1 |
| Southern Miss | | – | | 8 | – | 4 | – | 0 |
| Temple | | – | | 7 | – | 4 | – | 0 |
| Syracuse | | – | | 7 | – | 4 | – | 2 |
| Army | | – | | 6 | – | 5 | – | 0 |
| Northern Illinois | | – | | 6 | – | 5 | – | 0 |
| South Carolina | | – | | 6 | – | 5 | – | 0 |
| Virginia Tech | | – | | 6 | – | 5 | – | 0 |
| East Carolina | | – | | 5 | – | 6 | – | 0 |
| Southwestern Louisiana | | – | | 5 | – | 6 | – | 0 |
| Navy | | – | | 5 | – | 6 | – | 0 |
| Memphis State | | – | | 4 | – | 6 | – | 1 |
| Boston College | | – | | 4 | – | 7 | – | 0 |
| Tulane | | – | | 4 | – | 7 | – | 0 |
| West Virginia | | – | | 4 | – | 7 | – | 0 |
| Akron | | – | | 3 | – | 7 | – | 1 |
| Pittsburgh | | – | | 3 | – | 7 | – | 1 |
| Rutgers | | – | | 3 | – | 8 | – | 0 |
| Tulsa | | – | | 3 | – | 8 | – | 0 |
| Cincinnati | | – | | 1 | – | 10 | – | 0 |
Rankings from AP Poll

The 1990 Army Cadets football team was an American football team that represented the United States Military Academy as an independent during the 1990 NCAA Division I-A football season. In their eighth season under head coach Jim Young, the Cadets compiled a 6–5 record and outscored opponents by a total of 295 to 264. In the annual Army–Navy Game, the Cadets defeated Navy, 30–20.

== Schedule ==
| Date | Time | Opponent | Site | TV | Result | Attendance | Source |
|---|---|---|---|---|---|---|---|
| September 15 | | No. 4 (I–AA) Holy Cross | Michie Stadium; West Point, NY | | W 24–7 | 30,880 | |
| September 22 | | VMI | Michie Stadium; West Point, NY | | W 41–17 | 33,839 | |
| September 29 | 1:00 p.m. | at Wake Forest | Groves Stadium; Winston-Salem, NC | | L 14–52 | 20,117 | |
| October 6 | | Duke | Michie Stadium; West Point, NY | | L 16–17 | 41,014 | |
| October 13 | | at Boston College | Alumni Stadium; Chestnut Hill, MA | | L 20–41 | 25,463 | |
| October 20 | | Lafayette | Michie Stadium; West Point, NY | | W 56–0 | 38,947 | |
| October 27 | 12:00 p.m. | Syracuse | Michie Stadium; West Point, NY | JPS | L 14–26 | 41,153 | |
| November 3 | | Rutgers | Michie Stadium; West Point, NY | | W 35–31 | 38,945 | |
| November 10 | | Air Force | Michie Stadium; West Point, NY (Commander-in-Chief's Trophy) | | L 3–15 | 30,144 | |
| November 17 | | at Vanderbilt | Vanderbilt Stadium; Nashville, TN | | W 42–38 | 30,941 | |
| December 8 | | vs. Navy | Veterans Stadium; Philadelphia, PA (Army–Navy Game) | | W 30–20 | 67,622 | |
Rankings from NCAA Division I-AA Football Committee Poll released prior to the game; All times are in Eastern time

== Game summaries ==
=== Rutgers ===
Rutgers Scarlet Knights (3–5) at Army Cadets (3–4)

| Quarter | 1 | 2 | Total |
|---|---|---|---|
| Rutgers | | | 0 |
| Army | | | 0 |

at Michie Stadium, West Point, New York

- Date: November 3, 1990

100th anniversary of Army football

External videos
- Full game

Scoring summary

| Quarter | Time | Drive | | | Team | Scoring information | Score | |
| Quarter | Time | Plays | Yards | TOP | Team | Scoring information | RU | ARMY |
|---|---|---|---|---|---|---|---|---|
| 4 | 0:43 | 10 | 76 | | Army | Willie McMillian 4-yard touchdown run, kick good | 31 | 35 |
| "TOP" = time of possession. For other American football terms, see Glossary of American football. | | | | | | | 31 | 35 |

=== vs Navy ===
Army Cadets (5–5) vs. Navy Midshipmen (5–5)

| Quarter | 1 | 2 | 3 | 4 | Total |
|---|---|---|---|---|---|
| Army | 3 | 14 | 0 | 13 | 30 |
| Navy | 0 | 7 | 7 | 6 | 20 |

at Veterans Stadium • Philadelphia, Pennsylvania

- Date: December 8
- TV announcers (CBS): Jim Nantz, Tim Brant, and John Dockery
- NY Times

Game information

Army

- Willie McMillian
  1/1, 35 Yds, TD
  35 Rush, 195 Yds, TD
- Myreon Williams
  1 Rec, 35 Yds, TD

Navy

- Alton Grizzard
  13/25, TD, 2 INT

Scoring summary

| Quarter | Time | Drive | | | Team | Scoring information | Score | |
| Quarter | Time | Plays | Yards | TOP | Team | Scoring information | ARMY | NAVY |
|---|---|---|---|---|---|---|---|---|
| 2 | | | | | Army | McMillian -yard touchdown run, Malcolm kick good | 17 | 0 |
| 2 | 0:26 | | | | Navy | Dawson 6-yard touchdown reception from Grizzard, kick good | 17 | 7 |
| 3 | | | | | Navy | Stramanak 45-yard touchdown run, kick good | 17 | 14 |
| 4 | | | | | Army | Williams 35-yard touchdown reception from McMillian, Malcolm kick good | 24 | 14 |
| 4 | | 5 | 23 | | Navy | Grizzard -yard touchdown run, kick no good | 24 | 20 |
| 4 | | | | | Army | -yard field goal by Malcolm | 27 | 20 |
| 4 | | | | | Army | -yard field goal by Malcolm | 30 | 20 |
| "TOP" = time of possession. For other American football terms, see Glossary of American football. | | | | | | | 30 | 20 |

90th meeting

== Roster ==
1990 Army Cadets football team roster
Players
Coaches
Offense

| Pos. | # | Name | Class |
|---|---|---|---|
| OL | | Doug Baker |
| RB | | Calvin Cass | Sr |
| OL | | Steve Chalout |
| OL | | Greg Cleveland |
| WR | | Mark Dawkins |
| RB | | Phil Fant |
| RB | | Tom Hansbarger |
| RB | | Andy Kudiak |
| RB | | Corbett Leatherwood |
| QB | | Otto Leone |
| RB | | Rob Martinez |
| RB | | Mike Mayweather | Sr |
| QB | | Willie McMillian | Jr |
| QB | | Bryan McWilliams |
| RB | | Ken Miller |
| WR | | Edrian Oliver |
| OL | | Bret Petkus |
| RB | | John Ring |
| WR | | Chris Shaw |
| RB | | Arlen Smith |
| OL | | Bill Speier |
| RB | | Callian Thomas |
| RB | | Steve Weber |
| WR | | Myreon Williams |

Defense

| Pos. | # | Name | Class |
|---|---|---|---|
| DB | | Rick Angle |
| DL | | Lance Chambers |
| DL | | Tod Childs |
| DB | | Jerry Farnsworth |
| DB | | Ed Givens |
| DL | | Terry Hill |
| DB | | Mike McElrath |
| DL | | Greg Mogavero |
| LB | | Chet Nadolski |
| LB | | Anthony Noto |
| LB | | Rone Reed |
| LB | | John Robb |
| DL | | Wade Smith |

Special teams

| Pos. | # | Name | Class |
|---|---|---|---|
| P | | Jason Brocke |
| P | | Todd Hawkins |
| K | | Patmon Malcolm |
| K | | Chance Mercure |

Head coach

- Jim Young

Coordinators/assistant coaches

- Bob Sutton (DC)

Legend

- (C) Team captain
- (S) Suspended
- (I) Ineligible
- Injured
- Redshirt
