= 1990 Tulane Green Wave football team =

American college football season

1990 Tulane Green Wave football
- Conference: Independent
- Record: 4–7
- Head coach: Greg Davis (3rd season)
- Home stadium: Louisiana Superdome

1990 NCAA Division I-A independents football records
	Conf.			Overall
Team	W	L	T	W		L		T
No. 14 Louisville		–		10	–	1	–	1
No. 3 Miami (FL)		–		10	–	2	–	0
No. 4 Florida State		–		10	–	2	–	0
No. 6 Notre Dame		–		9	–	3	–	0
No. 11 Penn State		–		9	–	3	–	0
Louisiana Tech		–		8	–	3	–	1
Southern Miss		–		8	–	4	–	0
Temple		–		7	–	4	–	0
Syracuse		–		7	–	4	–	2
Army		–		6	–	5	–	0
Northern Illinois		–		6	–	5	–	0
South Carolina		–		6	–	5	–	0
Virginia Tech		–		6	–	5	–	0
East Carolina		–		5	–	6	–	0
Southwestern Louisiana		–		5	–	6	–	0
Navy		–		5	–	6	–	0
Memphis State		–		4	–	6	–	1
Boston College		–		4	–	7	–	0
Tulane		–		4	–	7	–	0
West Virginia		–		4	–	7	–	0
Akron		–		3	–	7	–	1
Pittsburgh		–		3	–	7	–	1
Rutgers		–		3	–	8	–	0
Tulsa		–		3	–	8	–	0
Cincinnati		–		1	–	10	–	0
Rankings from AP Poll

The 1990 Tulane Green Wave football team was an American football team that represented Tulane University during the 1990 NCAA Division I-A football season as an independent. In their third year under head coach Greg Davis, the team compiled a 4–7 record.

== Schedule ==
Date	Time	Opponent	Site	TV	Result	Attendance	Source
September 1		Southwestern Louisiana	Louisiana Superdome; New Orleans, LA		L 6–48	29,298	
September 8		at Rice	Rice Stadium; Houston, Texas		W 21–10	20,200	
September 15		SMU	Louisiana Superdome; New Orleans, LA		W 43–7	20,434	
September 22	7:00 p.m.	No. 2 Florida State	Louisiana Superdome; New Orleans, LA	PPV	L 13–31	32,170	
September 29	1:00 p.m.	at Ole Miss	Vaught–Hemingway Stadium; Oxford, MS (rivalry)		L 21–31	20,500	
October 6		at Memphis State	Liberty Bowl Memorial Stadium; Memphis, TN		L 14–21	26,759	
October 13		Southern Miss	Louisiana Superdome; New Orleans, LA (rivalry)		L 14–20	26,662	
October 20		Mississippi State	Louisiana Superdome; New Orleans, LA		L 17–38	22,826	
October 27		Cincinnati	Louisiana Superdome; New Orleans, LA		W 49–7	21,548	
November 10	12:30 p.m.	at Syracuse	Carrier Dome; Syracuse, NY		W 26–24	48,488	
November 24	7:00 p.m.	at LSU	Tiger Stadium; Baton Rouge, LA (Battle for the Rag)		L 13–16	67,435	
Rankings from AP Poll released prior to the game; All times are in Central time

== Roster ==
1990 Tulane Green Wave football team roster
Players
Coaches
Offense

Pos.	#	Name	Class
OT	72	Darin Shoulders	Sr

Defense

Pos.	#	Name	Class
DB	29	Corey Dowden	Sr
LB	89	Ruffin Hamilton	Fr

Special teams

Pos.	#	Name	Class

Head coach

- Greg Davis

Coordinators/assistant coaches

Legend

- (C) Team captain
- (S) Suspended
- (I) Ineligible
- Injured
- Redshirt
