= 1990 South Carolina Gamecocks football team =

American college football season

1990 South Carolina Gamecocks football
- Conference: Independent
- Record: 6–5
- Head coach: Sparky Woods (2nd season)
- Offensive coordinator: Art Wilkins (2nd season)
- Defensive coordinator: Rick Whitt (2nd season)
- Home stadium: Williams–Brice Stadium

1990 NCAA Division I-A independents football records
	Conf.			Overall
Team	W	L	T	W		L		T
No. 14 Louisville		–		10	–	1	–	1
No. 3 Miami (FL)		–		10	–	2	–	0
No. 4 Florida State		–		10	–	2	–	0
No. 6 Notre Dame		–		9	–	3	–	0
No. 11 Penn State		–		9	–	3	–	0
Louisiana Tech		–		8	–	3	–	1
Southern Miss		–		8	–	4	–	0
Temple		–		7	–	4	–	0
Syracuse		–		7	–	4	–	2
Army		–		6	–	5	–	0
Northern Illinois		–		6	–	5	–	0
South Carolina		–		6	–	5	–	0
Virginia Tech		–		6	–	5	–	0
East Carolina		–		5	–	6	–	0
Southwestern Louisiana		–		5	–	6	–	0
Navy		–		5	–	6	–	0
Memphis State		–		4	–	6	–	1
Boston College		–		4	–	7	–	0
Tulane		–		4	–	7	–	0
West Virginia		–		4	–	7	–	0
Akron		–		3	–	7	–	1
Pittsburgh		–		3	–	7	–	1
Rutgers		–		3	–	8	–	0
Tulsa		–		3	–	8	–	0
Cincinnati		–		1	–	10	–	0
Rankings from AP Poll

The 1990 South Carolina Gamecocks football team represented the University of South Carolina as an independent during the 1990 NCAA Division I-A football season. The Gamecocks were led by Sparky Woods in his second year as head coach and played their home games at Williams–Brice Stadium.

Led by quarterback Bobby Fuller, the Gamecocks finished the season with a record of 6–5. Their loss to The Citadel was the program's first loss to a Division I-AA team since 1982, and would be the last until 2015. South Carolina was bowl-eligible, but athletics director King Dixon declined a bowl bid, likely due to the lingering effects of the 1988 steroids scandal. This was Woods' second and final winning season with the Gamecocks; it would be South Carolina's last winning season until 1994.

== Schedule ==
Date	Time	Opponent	Rank	Site	TV	Result	Attendance	Source
September 1	7:00 pm	Duke		Williams–Brice Stadium; Columbia, SC		W 21–10	71,606	
September 8	7:00 pm	North Carolina		Williams–Brice Stadium; Columbia, SC (rivalry)		W 27–5	73,500	
September 22	12:00 pm	at Virginia Tech		Lane Stadium; Blacksburg, VA	HTS	W 35–24	41,462	
September 29	4:00 pm	at Georgia Tech	No. 25	Bobby Dodd Stadium; Atlanta, GA	ESPN	L 6–27	46,011	
October 13	12:00 pm	East Carolina^{†}		Williams–Brice Stadium; Columbia, SC		W 37–7	33,810	
October 20	1:30 pm	The Citadel		Williams–Brice Stadium; Columbia, SC		L 35–38	63,000	
October 27	1:00 pm	at NC State		Carter–Finley Stadium; Raleigh, NC		L 29–38	45,800	
November 3	12:00 pm	No. 12 Florida State		Williams–Brice Stadium; Columbia, SC	SSN	L 10–41	71,438	
November 10	1:30 pm	Southern Illinois		Williams–Brice Stadium; Columbia, SC		W 38–13	52,812	
November 17	1:00 pm	at Clemson		Memorial Stadium; Clamson, SC (rivalry)	JPS	L 15–24	83,823	
November 22	8:00 pm	West Virginia		Williams–Brice Stadium; Columbia, SC	ESPN	W 29–10	64,251	
^{†}Homecoming; Rankings from AP Poll released prior to the game; All times are in Eastern time

== Roster ==
Bobby Fuller* QB Wright Mitchell QB Mike Dingle* RB Ken Watson* RB Rob DeBoer RB Albert Haynes RB Terry Wilburn RB Leroy Jeter RB Frank Adams RB Eddie Miller* WR Robert Brooks* WR George Rush WR David Pitchko WR Mario Henry WR Bralyn Bennett WR Carl Platt WR Bill Zorr WR Darren Greene WR Charles Steward* TE Mike Whitman TE Matthew Campbell TE Mathew Campbell TE Hal Hamrick* OL Ike Harris* OL Jay Killen* OL Antoine Rivens* OL Calvin Stephens* OL Scott Cooley OL Rich Sweet OL Gerald Dixon* DL Marty Dye* DL Corey Miller* DL Kurt Wilson* DL Cedric Bembery DL Ernest Dixon* LB Patrick Hinton* LB Joe Reaves* LB Eric Brown LB Keith Emmons LB Leon Harris* DB Keith McDonald* DB Cedric Surratt* DB Antonio Walker* DB Bru Pender DB
