= 1990 Akron Zips football team =

American college football season

1990 Akron Zips football
- Conference: Independent
- Record: 3–7–1
- Head coach: Gerry Faust (5th season)
- Offensive coordinator: Ron Toman (1st season)
- Defensive coordinator: Bob Junko (3rd season)
- Home stadium: Rubber Bowl

1990 NCAA Division I-A independents football records
| | Conf. | | | Overall |
| Team | W | L | T | W | | L | | T |
|---|---|---|---|---|---|---|---|---|
| No. 14 Louisville | | – | | 10 | – | 1 | – | 1 |
| No. 3 Miami (FL) | | – | | 10 | – | 2 | – | 0 |
| No. 4 Florida State | | – | | 10 | – | 2 | – | 0 |
| No. 6 Notre Dame | | – | | 9 | – | 3 | – | 0 |
| No. 11 Penn State | | – | | 9 | – | 3 | – | 0 |
| Louisiana Tech | | – | | 8 | – | 3 | – | 1 |
| Southern Miss | | – | | 8 | – | 4 | – | 0 |
| Temple | | – | | 7 | – | 4 | – | 0 |
| Syracuse | | – | | 7 | – | 4 | – | 2 |
| Army | | – | | 6 | – | 5 | – | 0 |
| Northern Illinois | | – | | 6 | – | 5 | – | 0 |
| South Carolina | | – | | 6 | – | 5 | – | 0 |
| Virginia Tech | | – | | 6 | – | 5 | – | 0 |
| East Carolina | | – | | 5 | – | 6 | – | 0 |
| Southwestern Louisiana | | – | | 5 | – | 6 | – | 0 |
| Navy | | – | | 5 | – | 6 | – | 0 |
| Memphis State | | – | | 4 | – | 6 | – | 1 |
| Boston College | | – | | 4 | – | 7 | – | 0 |
| Tulane | | – | | 4 | – | 7 | – | 0 |
| West Virginia | | – | | 4 | – | 7 | – | 0 |
| Akron | | – | | 3 | – | 7 | – | 1 |
| Pittsburgh | | – | | 3 | – | 7 | – | 1 |
| Rutgers | | – | | 3 | – | 8 | – | 0 |
| Tulsa | | – | | 3 | – | 8 | – | 0 |
| Cincinnati | | – | | 1 | – | 10 | – | 0 |
Rankings from AP Poll

The 1990 Akron Zips football team represented Akron University in the 1990 NCAA Division I-A football season as Division I-A independents. They were led by fifth–year head coach Gerry Faust. The Zips played their home games at the Rubber Bowl in Akron, Ohio. They finished the season with a record of 3–7–1.

== Schedule ==
| Date | Opponent | Site | Result | Attendance | Source |
|---|---|---|---|---|---|
| September 1 | Illinois State | Rubber Bowl; Akron, OH | W 17–7 | 20,001 | |
| September 8 | at Kent State | Dix Stadium; Kent, OH (Wagon Wheel) | W 38–10 | 17,700 | |
| September 15 | Central Michigan | Rubber Bowl; Akron, OH | T 14–14 | 7,236 | |
| September 22 | Cal State Fullerton | Rubber Bowl; Akron, OH | W 48–17 | 10,241 | |
| September 29 | at No. 12 (I-AA) Youngstown State | Stambaugh Stadium; Youngstown, OH (Steel Tire) | L 23–28 | 17,001 | |
| October 6 | Western Michigan | Rubber Bowl; Akron, OH | L 20–24 | 11,310 | |
| October 13 | at Navy | Navy–Marine Corps Memorial Stadium; Annapolis, MD | L 13–17 | 18,977 | |
| October 20 | at No. 17 Florida | Ben Hill Griffin Stadium; Gainesville, FL | L 0–59 | 74,558 | |
| October 27 | at Rutgers | Rutgers Stadium; Piscataway, NJ | L 17–20 | 25,855 | |
| November 3 | Northern Illinois | Rubber Bowl; Akron, OH | L 28–31 | 7,032 | |
| November 10 | at Louisiana Tech | Joe Aillet Stadium; Ruston, LA | L 15–36 | 14,600 | |
Rankings from AP Poll released prior to the game
