= 1990 Louisville Cardinals football team =

American college football season

1990 Louisville Cardinals football

Fiesta Bowl champion

Fiesta Bowl, W 34–7 vs. Alabama
- Conference: Independent

Ranking
- Coaches: No. 12
- AP: No. 14
- Record: 10–1–1
- Head coach: Howard Schnellenberger (6th season)
- Offensive coordinator: Gary Nord (2nd season)
- Defensive coordinator: Rick Lantz (5th season)
- Home stadium: Cardinal Stadium

1990 NCAA Division I-A independents football records
	Conf.			Overall
Team	W	L	T	W		L		T
No. 14 Louisville		–		10	–	1	–	1
No. 3 Miami (FL)		–		10	–	2	–	0
No. 4 Florida State		–		10	–	2	–	0
No. 6 Notre Dame		–		9	–	3	–	0
No. 11 Penn State		–		9	–	3	–	0
Louisiana Tech		–		8	–	3	–	1
Southern Miss		–		8	–	4	–	0
Temple		–		7	–	4	–	0
Syracuse		–		7	–	4	–	2
Army		–		6	–	5	–	0
Northern Illinois		–		6	–	5	–	0
South Carolina		–		6	–	5	–	0
Virginia Tech		–		6	–	5	–	0
East Carolina		–		5	–	6	–	0
Southwestern Louisiana		–		5	–	6	–	0
Navy		–		5	–	6	–	0
Memphis State		–		4	–	6	–	1
Boston College		–		4	–	7	–	0
Tulane		–		4	–	7	–	0
West Virginia		–		4	–	7	–	0
Akron		–		3	–	7	–	1
Pittsburgh		–		3	–	7	–	1
Rutgers		–		3	–	8	–	0
Tulsa		–		3	–	8	–	0
Cincinnati		–		1	–	10	–	0
Rankings from AP Poll

The 1990 Louisville Cardinals football team represented the University of Louisville as an independent during the 1990 NCAA Division I-A football season. Led by the sixth-year head coach Howard Schnellenberger, the Cardinals compiled a record of 10–1–1 and defeated Alabama in the Fiesta Bowl. Louisville team played home games at Cardinal Stadium in Louisville, Kentucky.

== Schedule ==
Date	Opponent	Rank	Site	Result	Attendance	Source
September 1	at San Jose State		Spartan Stadium; San Jose, CA	T 10–10	16,281	
September 8	Murray State		Cardinal Stadium; Louisville, KY	W 68–0	34,417	
September 15	Kansas		Cardinal Stadium; Louisville, KY	W 28–16	35,848	
September 22	at West Virginia		Mountaineer Field; Morgantown, WV	W 9–7	61,933	
September 29	at Southern Miss		M. M. Roberts Stadium; Hattiesburg, MS	L 13–25	20,545	
October 6	Tulsa		Cardinal Stadium; Louisville, KY	W 38–14	36,692	
October 13	Memphis State		Cardinal Stadium; Louisville, KY (rivalry)	W 19–17	37,423	
October 20	at Pittsburgh		Pitt Stadium; Pittsburgh, PA	W 27–20	34,261	
October 27	Western Kentucky		Cardinal Stadium; Louisville, KY	W 41–7	35,122	
November 3	at Cincinnati	No. 25	Riverfront Stadium; Cincinnati, OH (The Keg of Nails)	W 41–16	23,575	
November 10	Boston College	No. 22	Cardinal Stadium; Louisville, KY	W 17–10	37,636	
January 1	vs. No. 25 Alabama	No. 18	Sun Devil Stadium; Tempe, AZ (Fiesta Bowl)	W 34–7	69,098	
Rankings from AP Poll released prior to the game

== Game summaries ==
=== Vs. Alabama (Fiesta Bowl) ===
Louisville vs. Alabama

Team	1	2	3	4	Total
• No. 18 Cardinals	25	0	7	2	34
No. 25 Crimson Tide	0	7	0	0	7

- Date:
  January 1
- Location: Sun Devil Stadium, Tempe, Arizona
- Game attendance: 69,098
- TV announcers (NBC): Charlie Jones and Todd Christensen

Scoring summary
1	7:35	LOU	Latrell Ware 70-yard pass from Browning Nagle (Klaus Wilmsmeyer kick)	LOU 7–0
1	3:40	LOU	Ralph Dawkins 5-yard run (kick blocked)	LOU 13–0
1	0:54	LOU	Anthony Cummings 37-yard pass from Browning Nagle (pass failed)	LOU 19–0
1	0:01	LOU	Ray Buchanan recovery of a blocked punt in the end zone (pass failed)	LOU 25–0
2	7:32	ALA	Charles Garner 49-yard interception return (Philip Doyle kick)	LOU 25–7
3	10:17	LOU	Anthony Cummings 19-yard pass from Browning Nagle (Ron Bell kick)	LOU 32–7
4	10:16	LOU	Safety, Danny Woodson was called for intentional grounding in the endzone (kick)	LOU 34–7

Browning Nagle threw for a Fiesta Bowl record 451 yards and 3 touchdowns as the Cardinals routed the Crimson Tide, 34–7.

== Roster ==
1990 Louisville Cardinals football team roster
Players
Coaches
Offense

Pos.	#	Name	Class
OL	64	John Bock	Fr
WR	91	Greg Brohm	So
QB	11	Jeff Brohm	Fr
OT	72	Jerry Crafts	Sr
WR	5	Anthony Cummings	Sr
QB	7	Browning Nagle	Sr
RB	22	Ralph Dawkins	Fr
QB	13	Erik Watts	Jr

Defense

Pos.	#	Name	Class
CB	34	Ray Buchanan	So
DL	99	Ted Washington	Sr

Special teams

Pos.	#	Name	Class
K	4	Klaus Wilmsmeyer	Jr

Head coach

- Howard Schnellenberger

Coordinators/assistant coaches

Legend

- (C) Team captain
- (S) Suspended
- (I) Ineligible
- Injured
- Redshirt

== 1991 NFL draft ==
Player	Position	Round	Pick	NFL club
Ted Washington	Nose tackle	1	25	San Francisco 49ers
Browning Nagle	Quarterback	2	34	New York Jets
Jerry Crafts	Tackle	11	292	Indianapolis Colts
Mike Flores	Defensive end	11	298	Philadelphia Eagles
