= 1990 Boston College Eagles football team =

American college football season

1990 Boston College Eagles football
- Conference: Independent
- Record: 4–7
- Head coach: Jack Bicknell (10th season)
- Defensive coordinator: Seymour "Red" Kelin (10th season)
- Captains: Ray Hilvert; Kevin Pearson; Mike Sanders
- Home stadium: Alumni Stadium

1990 Major eastern college football independents records
	Conf.					Overall
Team	W		L		T	W		L		T
No. 11 Penn State $	6	–	0	–	0	9	–	3	–	0
Syracuse	4	–	1	–	1	7	–	4	–	2
Temple	3	–	2	–	0	7	–	4	–	0
West Virginia	2	–	3	–	0	4	–	7	–	0
Pittsburgh	2	–	3	–	1	3	–	7	–	1
Boston College	2	–	4	–	0	4	–	7	–	0
Rutgers	0	–	6	–	0	3	–	8	–	0
$ – Lambert Trophy Winner; Rankings from AP Poll

1990 NCAA Division I-A independents football records
	Conf.			Overall
Team	W	L	T	W		L		T
No. 14 Louisville		–		10	–	1	–	1
No. 3 Miami (FL)		–		10	–	2	–	0
No. 4 Florida State		–		10	–	2	–	0
No. 6 Notre Dame		–		9	–	3	–	0
No. 11 Penn State		–		9	–	3	–	0
Louisiana Tech		–		8	–	3	–	1
Southern Miss		–		8	–	4	–	0
Temple		–		7	–	4	–	0
Syracuse		–		7	–	4	–	2
Army		–		6	–	5	–	0
Northern Illinois		–		6	–	5	–	0
South Carolina		–		6	–	5	–	0
Virginia Tech		–		6	–	5	–	0
East Carolina		–		5	–	6	–	0
Southwestern Louisiana		–		5	–	6	–	0
Navy		–		5	–	6	–	0
Memphis State		–		4	–	6	–	1
Boston College		–		4	–	7	–	0
Tulane		–		4	–	7	–	0
West Virginia		–		4	–	7	–	0
Akron		–		3	–	7	–	1
Pittsburgh		–		3	–	7	–	1
Rutgers		–		3	–	8	–	0
Tulsa		–		3	–	8	–	0
Cincinnati		–		1	–	10	–	0
Rankings from AP Poll

The 1990 Boston College Eagles football team represented Boston College as an independent during the 1990 NCAA Division I-A football season. The Eagles were led by head coach Jack Bicknell, in his 10th and final season with Boston College, and played their home games at Alumni Stadium in Chestnut Hill, Massachusetts. This was the last season in which Boston College competed as an independent, as the Big East Conference, of which the Eagles were a founding member, began sponsoring football in 1991.

== Schedule ==
Date	Opponent	Site	Result	Attendance	Source
September 8	at No. 17 Pittsburgh	Pitt Stadium; Pittsburgh, PA	L 6–29	35,409	
September 15	No. 17 Ohio State	Alumni Stadium; Chestnut Hill, MA	L 10–31	32,432	
September 29	at Navy	Navy–Marine Corps Memorial Stadium; Annapolis, MD	W 28–17	25,551	
October 6	Rutgers	Alumni Stadium; Chestnut Hill, MA	W 19–14	31,262	
October 13	Army	Alumni Stadium; Chestnut Hill, MA	W 41–20	25,463	
October 20	Penn State	Alumni Stadium; Chestnut Hill, MA	L 21–40	32,000	
October 27	at West Virginia	Mountaineer Field; Morgantown, WV	W 27–14	56,685	
November 3	Syracuse	Alumni Stadium; Chestnut Hill, MA	L 6–35	32,213	
November 10	at No. 22 Louisville	Cardinal Stadium; Louisville, KY	L 10–17	37,636	
November 17	at No. 3 Miami (FL)	Miami Orange Bowl; Miami, FL	L 12–42	50,942	
November 24	Temple	Alumni Stadium; Chestnut Hill, MA	L 10–29	21,067	
Rankings from AP Poll released prior to the game

== Roster ==
1990 Boston College Eagles football team roster
Players
Coaches
Offense

Pos.	#	Name	Class
TE	89	Mark Chmura	Jr
QB	13	Glenn Foley	Fr
QB	8	Willie Hicks	Sr
OT	72	Mike Jovanovich	Sr
RB	49	Kevin Lyles	Sr
C	64	Tom Nalen	Fr
RB	35	Ed Toner	Sr

Defense

Pos.	#	Name	Class
LB	88	Ivan Caesar	Sr
LB	53	Tom McManus	So
DT	67	Ron Stone	So

Special teams

Pos.	#	Name	Class

Head coach

- Jack Bicknell

Coordinators/assistant coaches

Legend

- (C) Team captain
- (S) Suspended
- (I) Ineligible
- Injured
- Redshirt
