= 1990 Southwestern Louisiana Ragin' Cajuns football team =

American college football season

1990 Southwestern Louisiana Ragin' Cajuns football
- Conference: Independent
- Record: 5–6
- Head coach: Nelson Stokley (5th season)
- Home stadium: Cajun Field

1990 NCAA Division I-A independents football records
	Conf.			Overall
Team	W	L	T	W		L		T
No. 14 Louisville		–		10	–	1	–	1
No. 3 Miami (FL)		–		10	–	2	–	0
No. 4 Florida State		–		10	–	2	–	0
No. 6 Notre Dame		–		9	–	3	–	0
No. 11 Penn State		–		9	–	3	–	0
Louisiana Tech		–		8	–	3	–	1
Southern Miss		–		8	–	4	–	0
Temple		–		7	–	4	–	0
Syracuse		–		7	–	4	–	2
Army		–		6	–	5	–	0
Northern Illinois		–		6	–	5	–	0
South Carolina		–		6	–	5	–	0
Virginia Tech		–		6	–	5	–	0
East Carolina		–		5	–	6	–	0
Southwestern Louisiana		–		5	–	6	–	0
Navy		–		5	–	6	–	0
Memphis State		–		4	–	6	–	1
Boston College		–		4	–	7	–	0
Tulane		–		4	–	7	–	0
West Virginia		–		4	–	7	–	0
Akron		–		3	–	7	–	1
Pittsburgh		–		3	–	7	–	1
Rutgers		–		3	–	8	–	0
Tulsa		–		3	–	8	–	0
Cincinnati		–		1	–	10	–	0
Rankings from AP Poll

The 1990 Southwestern Louisiana Ragin' Cajuns football team was an American football team that represented the University of Southwestern Louisiana (now known as the University of Louisiana at Lafayette) as an independent during the 1990 NCAA Division I-A football season. In their fifth year under head coach Nelson Stokley, the team compiled a 5–6 record.

== Schedule ==
Date	Opponent	Site	Result	Attendance	Source
September 1	at Tulane	Louisiana Superdome; New Orleans, LA	W 48–6	29,298	
September 8	Nicholls State	Cajun Field; Lafayette, LA	W 24–21	22,131	
September 15	at Texas A&M	Kyle Field; College Station, TX	L 14–63	51,713	
September 22	East Carolina	Cajun Field; Lafayette, LA	L 10–20	19,524	
September 29	at Louisiana Tech	Joe Aillet Stadium; Ruston, LA (rivalry)	L 10–24	19,680	
October 6	Alabama	Cajun Field; Lafayette, LA	L 6–25	36,133	
October 20	at Tulsa	Skelly Stadium; Tulsa, OK	W 25–13	18,019	
October 27	at Memphis State	Liberty Bowl Memorial Stadium; Memphis, TN	L 6–20	21,628	
November 3	Southern Miss	Cajun Field; Lafayette, LA	L 13–14	17,860	
November 10	at Arkansas State	Indian Stadium; Jonesboro, AR	W 17–16	13,462	
November 17	Northern Illinois	Cajun Field; Lafayette, LA	W 24–20	16,325	
