= 1990 Louisiana Tech Bulldogs football team =

American college football season

1990 Louisiana Tech Bulldogs football

Independence Bowl, T 34–34 vs. Maryland
- Conference: Independent
- Record: 8–3–1
- Head coach: Joe Raymond Peace (3rd season)
- Offensive coordinator: Steve Ensminger (3rd season)
- Defensive coordinator: John Thompson (1st season)
- Captains: Mike Richardson; Bobby Slaughter
- Home stadium: Joe Aillet Stadium

1990 NCAA Division I-A independents football records
	Conf.			Overall
Team	W	L	T	W		L		T
No. 14 Louisville		–		10	–	1	–	1
No. 3 Miami (FL)		–		10	–	2	–	0
No. 4 Florida State		–		10	–	2	–	0
No. 6 Notre Dame		–		9	–	3	–	0
No. 11 Penn State		–		9	–	3	–	0
Louisiana Tech		–		8	–	3	–	1
Southern Miss		–		8	–	4	–	0
Temple		–		7	–	4	–	0
Syracuse		–		7	–	4	–	2
Army		–		6	–	5	–	0
Northern Illinois		–		6	–	5	–	0
South Carolina		–		6	–	5	–	0
Virginia Tech		–		6	–	5	–	0
East Carolina		–		5	–	6	–	0
Southwestern Louisiana		–		5	–	6	–	0
Navy		–		5	–	6	–	0
Memphis State		–		4	–	6	–	1
Boston College		–		4	–	7	–	0
Tulane		–		4	–	7	–	0
West Virginia		–		4	–	7	–	0
Akron		–		3	–	7	–	1
Pittsburgh		–		3	–	7	–	1
Rutgers		–		3	–	8	–	0
Tulsa		–		3	–	8	–	0
Cincinnati		–		1	–	10	–	0
Rankings from AP Poll

The 1990 Louisiana Tech Bulldogs football team was an American football team that represented Louisiana Tech University as an independent during the 1990 NCAA Division I-A football season. In their third year under head coach Joe Raymond Peace, the team compiled an 8–3–1 record and tied Maryland in the Independence Bowl.

== Schedule ==
Date	Time	Opponent	Site	TV	Result	Attendance	Source
September 1		at East Carolina	Ficklen Memorial Stadium; Greenville, NC		L 17–27	30,690	
September 8		at McNeese State	Cowboy Stadium; Lake Charles, LA		W 51–3	17,178	
September 15		at Western Michigan	Waldo Stadium; Kalamazoo, MI		L 21–27	17,046	
September 22		Arkansas State	Joe Aillet Stadium; Ruston, LA		W 40–7	18,325	
September 29		Southwestern Louisiana	Joe Aillet Stadium; Ruston, LA (rivalry)		W 24–10	19,680	
October 6	11:00 a.m.	at No. 5 Auburn	Jordan–Hare Stadium; Auburn, AL		L 14–16	72,350	
October 13		at Tulsa	Skelly Stadium; Tulsa, OK		W 35–21	17,658	
October 27		Stephen F. Austin	Joe Aillet Stadium; Ruston, LA		W 31–22	17,600	
November 3		at Northeast Louisiana	Malone Stadium; Monroe, LA (rivalry)		W 31–7	21,752	
November 10		Akron	Joe Aillet Stadium; Ruston, LA		W 36–15	14,600	
November 17		Colorado State	Joe Aillet Stadium; Ruston, LA		W 31–30	15,225	
December 15	7:00 p.m.	vs. Maryland	Independence Stadium; Shreveport, LA (Independence Bowl)	ABC	T 34–34	48,325	
Rankings from AP Poll released prior to the game; All times are in Central time

== Roster ==
- Gene Johnson, QB
- Sam Hughes, QB
- Aaron Ferguson, QB
- Mike Richardson, RB
- Jason Davis, RB
- Shane Benoit, RB
- Bobby Slaughter, WR
- Eddie Brown, WR
- Gerald Lawrence, WR
- Jerald Kennedy, WR
- Corey Parham, WR
- Tadara Joseph, WR
- Cory Butler, WR
- Brian Francis, WR
- Mark Rountree, WR
- Billy Walker, TE
- Ronnie Cook, TE
- Wade Christensen, TE
- Trey Snodgrass, C
- Alan Apple, OG
- Jerome Anderson, OG
- Scott Collis, OG
- Willie Roaf, OT
- Glen Hunt, OT
- Nathan Goodyear, C
- David Parker, OG
- Craig Calvery, OT
- Lloyd Whelchel, OT
- Nate Davis, DT
- Artie Smith, DT
- Baron Rollins, DT
- Warren Brady, NG
- Kavin Crawford, DT
- Howard McMahan, DE
- Rusty Cook, DE
- Eric Shaw, DE
- Shannon Cornelius, DE
- Steve Wilson, DE
- Stan Polk, LB
- Lorenza Baker, LB
- Myron Baker, LB
- Herman Piete, LB
- Pat Wilson, LB
- Carlos Bolton, LB
- Norman Dunn, LB
- Fred Price, LB
- Doug Evans, SS
- Demise Loyd, FS
- Dwight Nicholas, CB
- Freddie Smith, CB
- Carey Broudy, S
- Cedric Singleton, CB
- Jamie Evans, FS
- Deon Sharp, S
- Rocky Kingrea, CB
- Chris Gray, CB
- Brent DeLozier, S
- Chris Boniol, K
- Brad Boozer, P
- Russ Golden, DS

== Coaching staff ==
- Joe Raymond Peace, Head Coach
- Steve Ensminger, Offensive Coordinator
- Petey Perot, Offensive Line Coach
- Pat Tilley, Wide Receivers Coach
- Gary Quimby, Running Backs & Special Teams Coach
- Karl Terrebonne, Inside Receivers Coach
- John Thompson, Defensive Coordinator
- Jerry Baldwin, Linebackers Coach
- Gary Bartel, Defensive Backs Coach
- Joe Robinson, Defensive Line Coach
- Joe Taylor, Strength & Conditioning Coach
