= 1990 Navy Midshipmen football team =

American college football season

1990 Navy Midshipmen football
- Conference: Independent
- Record: 5–6
- Head coach: George Chaump (1st season)
- Defensive coordinator: Carl Reese (2nd season)
- MVP: Alton Grizzard
- Captains: Alton Grizzard; Bill Bowling
- Home stadium: Navy–Marine Corps Memorial Stadium

1990 NCAA Division I-A independents football records
	Conf.			Overall
Team	W	L	T	W		L		T
No. 14 Louisville		–		10	–	1	–	1
No. 3 Miami (FL)		–		10	–	2	–	0
No. 4 Florida State		–		10	–	2	–	0
No. 6 Notre Dame		–		9	–	3	–	0
No. 11 Penn State		–		9	–	3	–	0
Louisiana Tech		–		8	–	3	–	1
Southern Miss		–		8	–	4	–	0
Temple		–		7	–	4	–	0
Syracuse		–		7	–	4	–	2
Army		–		6	–	5	–	0
Northern Illinois		–		6	–	5	–	0
South Carolina		–		6	–	5	–	0
Virginia Tech		–		6	–	5	–	0
East Carolina		–		5	–	6	–	0
Southwestern Louisiana		–		5	–	6	–	0
Navy		–		5	–	6	–	0
Memphis State		–		4	–	6	–	1
Boston College		–		4	–	7	–	0
Tulane		–		4	–	7	–	0
West Virginia		–		4	–	7	–	0
Akron		–		3	–	7	–	1
Pittsburgh		–		3	–	7	–	1
Rutgers		–		3	–	8	–	0
Tulsa		–		3	–	8	–	0
Cincinnati		–		1	–	10	–	0
Rankings from AP Poll

The 1990 Navy Midshipmen football team represented the United States Naval Academy (USNA) as an independent during the 1990 NCAA Division I-A football season. The team was led by first-year head coach George Chaump.

== Schedule ==
Date	Time	Opponent	Site	Result	Attendance	Source
September 8		Richmond	Navy–Marine Corps Memorial Stadium; Annapolis, MD	W 28–17	23,161	
September 15	1:00 p.m.	at No. 11 Virginia	Scott Stadium; Charlottesville, VA	L 14–56	39,400	
September 22		Villanova	Navy–Marine Corps Memorial Stadium; Annapolis, MD	W 23–21	21,491	
September 29		Boston College	Navy–Marine Corps Memorial Stadium; Annapolis, MD	L 17–28	25,551	
October 6		at Air Force	Falcon Stadium; Colorado Springs, CO (Commander-in-Chief's Trophy)	L 7–24	50,821	
October 13		Akron	Navy–Marine Corps Memorial Stadium; Annapolis, MD	W 17–13	18,977	
October 27		James Madison^{†}	Navy–Marine Corps Memorial Stadium; Annapolis, MD	L 7–16	29,129	
November 3	12:00 p.m.	vs. No. 2 Notre Dame	Giants Stadium; East Rutherford, NJ (rivalry)	L 31–52	70,382	
November 10	4:30 p.m.	at Toledo	Glass Bowl; Toledo, OH	W 14–10	23,958	
November 17		Delaware	Navy–Marine Corps Memorial Stadium; Annapolis, MD	W 31–27	25,284	
December 8		vs. Army	Veterans Stadium; Philadelphia, PA (Army–Navy Game)	L 20–30	67,622	
^{†}Homecoming; Rankings from AP Poll released prior to the game; All times are in Eastern time

== Roster ==
1990 Navy Midshipmen football team roster
Players
Coaches
Offense

Pos.	#	Name	Class
WR		Jerry Dawson
QB	16	Alton Grizzard (C)	Sr
FB		Brad Stramanak	Fr

Defense

Pos.	#	Name	Class
CB		Chris Cordero
LB		Clayton Kendrick-Holmes

Special teams

Pos.	#	Name	Class

Head coach

- George Chaump

Coordinators/assistant coaches

Legend

- (C) Team captain
- (S) Suspended
- (I) Ineligible
- Injured
- Redshirt
