= 1990 Northern Illinois Huskies football team =

American college football season

1990 Northern Illinois Huskies football
- Conference: Independent
- Record: 6–5
- Head coach: Jerry Pettibone (6th season)
- Offensive coordinator: Mike Summers (3rd season)
- Defensive coordinator: Tim McGuire (5th season)
- Captains: Kevin Cassidy; Paul Rogan; Claude Royster
- Home stadium: Huskie Stadium

1990 NCAA Division I-A independents football records
	Conf.			Overall
Team	W	L	T	W		L		T
No. 14 Louisville		–		10	–	1	–	1
No. 3 Miami (FL)		–		10	–	2	–	0
No. 4 Florida State		–		10	–	2	–	0
No. 6 Notre Dame		–		9	–	3	–	0
No. 11 Penn State		–		9	–	3	–	0
Louisiana Tech		–		8	–	3	–	1
Southern Miss		–		8	–	4	–	0
Temple		–		7	–	4	–	0
Syracuse		–		7	–	4	–	2
Army		–		6	–	5	–	0
Northern Illinois		–		6	–	5	–	0
South Carolina		–		6	–	5	–	0
Virginia Tech		–		6	–	5	–	0
East Carolina		–		5	–	6	–	0
Southwestern Louisiana		–		5	–	6	–	0
Navy		–		5	–	6	–	0
Memphis State		–		4	–	6	–	1
Boston College		–		4	–	7	–	0
Tulane		–		4	–	7	–	0
West Virginia		–		4	–	7	–	0
Akron		–		3	–	7	–	1
Pittsburgh		–		3	–	7	–	1
Rutgers		–		3	–	8	–	0
Tulsa		–		3	–	8	–	0
Cincinnati		–		1	–	10	–	0
Rankings from AP Poll

The 1990 Northern Illinois Huskies football team represented Northern Illinois University as an independent during the 1990 NCAA Division I-A football season. Led by Jerry Pettibone in his sixth and final season as head coach, the Huskies compiled a record of 6–5. Northern Illinois played home games at Huskie Stadium in DeKalb, Illinois.

== Schedule ==
Date	Time	Opponent	Site	TV	Result	Attendance	Source
September 1	6:30 pm	No. T–17 (I-AA) Eastern Illinois	Huskie Stadium; Dekalb, IL		W 28–17	12,380	
September 8	1:30 pm	at No. 10 Nebraska	Memorial Stadium; Lincoln, NE		L 14–60	76,043	
September 15	6:30 pm	at Toledo	Glass Bowl; Toledo, OH		L 14–23	21,154	
September 22	6:30 pm	Kansas State	Huskie Stadium; DeKalb, IL		W 42–35	14,102	
September 29	11:30 am	at Northwestern	Dyche Stadium; Evanston, IL	ESPN	L 7–24	26,798	
October 6	1:00 pm	No. 24 Fresno State	Huskie Stadium; DeKalb, IL		W 73–18	18,067	
October 13	1:00 pm	Arkansas State	Huskie Stadium; DeKalb, IL		W 35–0	6,631	
October 20	1:00 pm	Murray State	Huskie Stadium; DeKalb, IL		W 49–7	15,987	
November 3	12:00 pm	at Akron	Rubber Bowl; Akron, OH		W 31–28	7,032	
November 10	12:30 pm	at East Carolina	Ficklen Memorial Stadium; Greenville, NC		L 20–24	20,100	
November 17	7:00 pm	at Southwestern Louisiana	Cajun Field; Lafayette, LA		L 20–24	16,325	
Rankings from AP Poll released prior to the game; All times are in Central time
