= Tom Tarver =

American teacher

Tom Tarver is an American teacher who was formerly an American football quarterback, playing for the Rutgers University Scarlet Knights. He was the team's starting quarterback in 1990 and 1991. After college, he became a coach at Manalapan High School.

== College ==
A resident of Jackson Township, New Jersey, Tarver was a quarterback at Jackson Memorial High School, leading the team to a 32–7 record as a started and earning All-County and All-Shore recognition in his final two seasons. He chose to attend Rutgers University. During his first two years at Rutgers, he appeared in six games and was a back-up to Scott Erney.

Tarver was named the team's starting quarterback in 1990. In the first game of the season on September 8, he completed 9 of 15 passes for 172 yards and two touchdowns, and Rutgers defeated Kentucky. The following week, against Colgate, he threw two touchdown passes again, and Rutgers won again. The Scarlet Knights then lost their third game to Penn State and eventually finished the season with a record of 3–8. Tarver led the team in passing yards, with 1,348.

Tarver remained the Scarlet Knights' starter as a fifth-year senior in 1991. He led the team to a victory in the first game of the season against Boston College, completing 21 for 30 passes for 275 yards, one touchdown, and one interception. On September 28, he had 180 passing yards, and Rutgers defeated Michigan State, 14–7. Tarver threw a two-yard touchdown pass to his roommate, Antoine Moore, with 46 seconds left to win it. In 2003, Tarver said that the Michigan State game was one of his fondest memories as a Rutgers player.

Rutgers defeated Maine on October 12, 1991, bringing their record to 5–1. Tarver was 15 for 24 passing with 247 yards, two touchdowns, and one interception. However, Rutgers then lost their next four games in a row. In the last game of the season, against Temple, Tarver had a career-high 311 passing yards and had touchdown passes of 70, 68, and 49 yards. The Scarlet Knights won, 41–0, to clinch a winning record. Tarver finished the year with 1,969 passing yards to lead the team for the second straight season. Over his entire Rutgers career, he completed 285 of 518 passes for 3,607 yards and had 20 touchdowns and 24 interceptions. He has the eighth-most passing yards in team history.

== After college ==
After Tarver graduated from college with a degree in special education, he became an assistant football coach at Freehold Boro High School. He was also a coach at Lakewood High School before becoming the coach at Manalapan High School in 1996. Tarver was the head football coach at Donovan Catholic High School in Toms River, New Jersey.
