= David Daniels (American football) =

American football player (born 1969)

No. 36, 88
- Position: Wide receiver

Personal information
- Born: September 16, 1969 (age 57); Sarasota, Florida, U.S.
- Listed height: 6 ft 1 in (1.85 m)
- Listed weight: 190 lb (86 kg)

Career information
- High school: Sarasota (FL)
- College: Penn State
- NFL draft: 1991: 3rd round, 74th overall pick

Career history
- Seattle Seahawks (1991–1992); New York Jets (1993)*
- * Offseason or practice squad member only

Career NFL statistics
- Games played: 29
- Receptions: 9
- Receiving yards: 137
- Stats at Pro Football Reference

David Daniels (born September 16, 1969) is an American former professional football player who was a wide receiver in the National Football League (NFL) who played for the Seattle Seahawks. He was selected by the Seahawks in the third round of the 1991 NFL draft. He played college football for the Penn State Nittany Lions.
