= John Snell (American football) =

American football coach and administrator (born c. 1965)

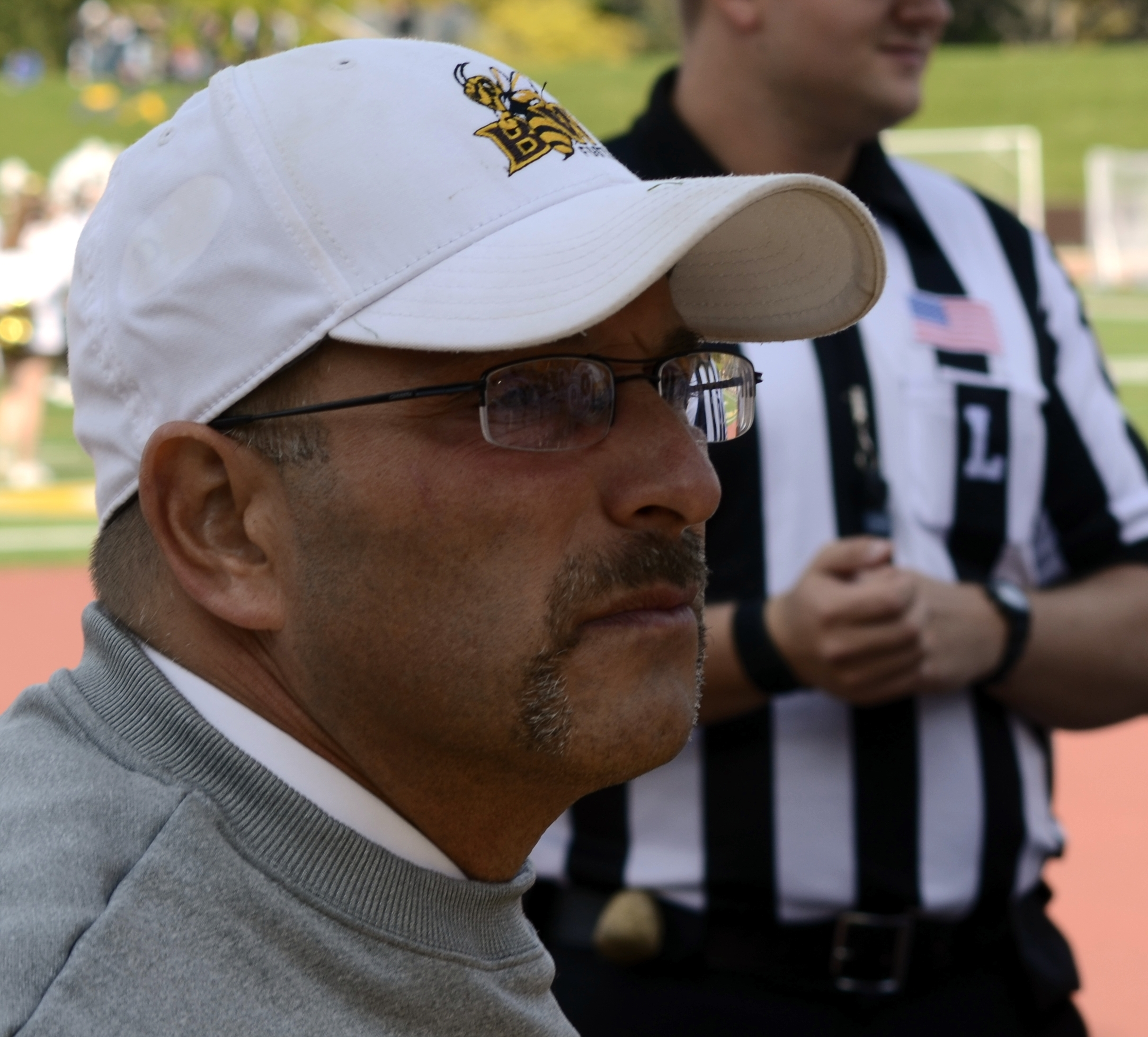
- Snell with Baldwin Wallace in 2012

Current position
- Title: Associate athletic director
- Team: Baldwin Wallace
- Conference: OAC

Biographical details
- Born: c. 1965 (age 60–61); Albion, New York, U.S.
- Education: Baldwin–Wallace College (1987)

Coaching career (HC unless noted)
- 1984–1986: Baldwin–Wallace (SA)
- 1987: Rochester (RB)
- 1988–1990: Rutgers (GA)
- 1991–1992: Buffalo (RB)
- 1993: Rochester (QB)
- 1994–1997: Baldwin–Wallace (QB)
- 1998–2000: Baldwin–Wallace (OC/QB)
- 2001: Baldwin–Wallace (AHC/OC/QB)
- 2002–2016: Baldwin–Wallace / Baldwin Wallace

Administrative career (AD unless noted)
- 2016–2020: Baldwin Wallace (assistant AD)
- 2020–2021: Baldwin Wallace (interim AD)
- 2021–present: Baldwin Wallace (associate AD)

Head coaching record
- Overall: 92–60
- Tournaments: 1–1 (NCAA D-III playoffs)

Accomplishments and honors

Awards
- 2× OAC co-Coach of the Year (2002, 2006)

John Snell (born c. 1965) is an American college administrator and former college football coach. He is the associate athletic director for Baldwin Wallace University, a position he has held since 2021. He was the head football coach for the university from 2002 to 2016.

== Coaching career ==
Snell graduated from Albion High School in 1983. He began his coaching career with Baldwin–Wallace College—now known as Baldwin Wallace University—under head coach Bob Packard as a student assistant. Following his graduation he coached for Rochester as the running backs coach under head coach Ray Tellier. In 1988, he coached for Rutgers as a graduate assistant helping with running backs alongside Craig Johnson under head coach Dick Anderson from 1988 to 1989 and Doug Graber in 1990. In 1991, he coached for Buffalo as the running backs coach under head coach Sam Sanders. In 1993, he rejoined Rochester as the quarterbacks coach under head coach Rich Parrinello. In 1994, Snell returned to his alma mater, Baldwin–Wallace, under Packard and served as quarterbacks coach until 1997. In 1998, he was promoted to offensive coordinator. In 2001, he was promoted to assistant head coach.

In 2002, Snell was named interim head football coach following the retirement of Packard. Following the 2002 season he was retained as the full-time head coach. In fifteen seasons with the Yellow Jackets, Snell amassed a career record of 92–60. He was named Ohio Athletic Conference (OAC) co-Coach of the Year twice: 2002 after finishing 8–2 and 2006 after finishing 7–3. His best season as head coach came in 2003 as he led the team to a 10–2 record and a playoff win. He resigned following the 2016 season.

== Administrative career ==
In 2016, Snell was named assistant athletic director for Baldwin Wallace. In 2020, he served as interim athletic director before becoming the associate athletic director in 2021.

== Head coaching record ==
| Year | Team | Overall | Conference | Standing | Bowl/playoffs | D3^{#} |
|---|---|---|---|---|---|---|
Baldwin–Wallace / Baldwin Wallace Yellow Jackets (Ohio Athletic Conference) (2002–2016)
| 2002 | Baldwin–Wallace | 8–2 | 7–2 | 3rd | | |
| 2003 | Baldwin–Wallace | 10–2 | 8–1 | 2nd | L NCAA Division III Second Round | 9 |
| 2004 | Baldwin–Wallace | 6–4 | 5–4 | T–5th | | |
| 2005 | Baldwin–Wallace | 4–6 | 3–6 | 7th | | |
| 2006 | Baldwin–Wallace | 7–3 | 6–3 | 3rd | | |
| 2007 | Baldwin–Wallace | 6–4 | 5–4 | T–4th | | |
| 2008 | Baldwin–Wallace | 5–5 | 5–4 | T–3rd | | |
| 2009 | Baldwin–Wallace | 3–7 | 3–6 | T–6th | | |
| 2010 | Baldwin–Wallace | 7–3 | 6–3 | 3rd | | |
| 2011 | Baldwin–Wallace | 8–2 | 7–2 | T–2nd | | 24 |
| 2012 | Baldwin Wallace | 7–3 | 6–3 | 4th | | |
| 2013 | Baldwin Wallace | 6–4 | 5–4 | T–4th | | |
| 2014 | Baldwin Wallace | 5–5 | 4–5 | 6th | | |
| 2015 | Baldwin Wallace | 7–3 | 7–2 | T–2nd | | |
| 2016 | Baldwin Wallace | 3–7 | 2–7 | 9th | | |
| Baldwin–Wallace / Baldwin Wallace: | | 92–60 | 79–56 | | | |
| Total: | | 92–60 | | | | |
