= 1991 Fiesta Bowl =

1991 Sunkist Fiesta Bowl
- 20th Fiesta Bowl
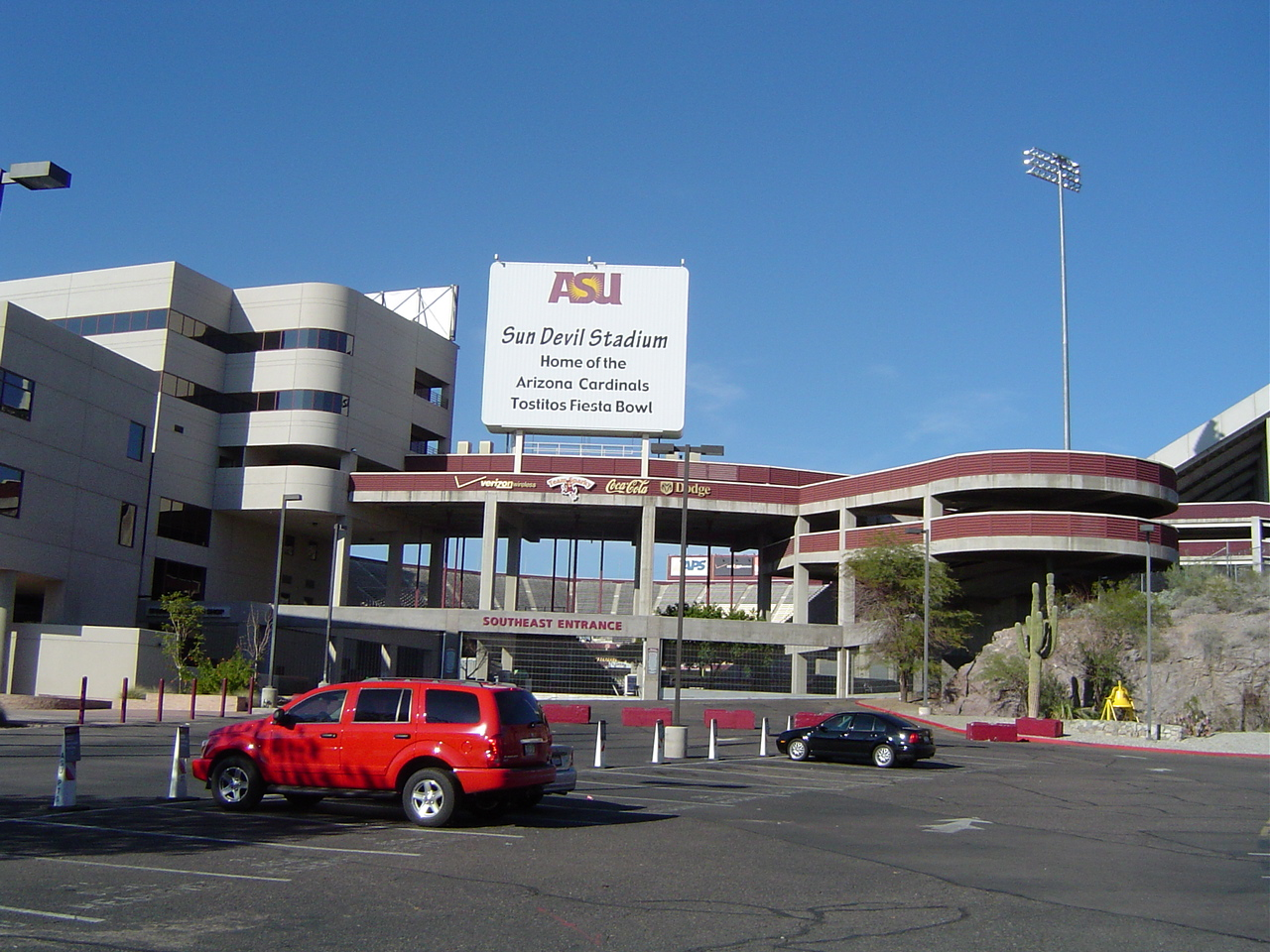
- Sun Devil Stadium in Tempe, Arizona, hosted the Fiesta Bowl.
Louisville Cardinals	Alabama Crimson Tide
(9–1–1)	(7–4)
Independent	SEC
34	7
Head coach: Howard Schnellenberger	Head coach: Gene Stallings
AP / Coaches; 18 / 16	AP / Coaches; 25 / 22
	1	2	3	4	Total
Louisville	25	0	7	2	34
Alabama	0	7	0	0	7
- Date: January 1, 1991
- Season: 1990
- Stadium: Sun Devil Stadium
- Location: Tempe, Arizona
- MVP: QB Browning Nagle & DB Ray Buchanan
- Favorite: Alabama by 8.5
- Referee: Dayle Phillips (ACC)
- Attendance: 69,098

United States TV coverage
- Network: NBC
- Announcers: Charlie Jones, Todd Christensen
- Nielsen ratings: 6.2

The 1991 Sunkist Fiesta Bowl, part of the 1990 bowl game season, took place on January 1, 1991, at Sun Devil Stadium in Tempe, Arizona. The competing teams were the Alabama Crimson Tide, representing the Southeastern Conference (SEC), and the Louisville Cardinals, competing as a football independent. In what was the 20th edition of the Fiesta Bowl, Louisville won the game 34–7.

== Teams ==
=== Alabama ===
Under new coach Gene Stallings, Alabama's secondary coach under Bear Bryant from 1958 to 1964, the 1990 Alabama squad opened the season ranked No. 13 only to be upset by Southern Miss, led by quarterback Brett Favre, in the opening game en route to an 0–3 start. The Crimson Tide also lost to Florida and Georgia during the skid.

The Tide recovered to win six of their next seven, losing only to Penn State in the final meeting between the schools for 20 years. Following its 24–3 victory over LSU, Alabama accepted a bid to the Fiesta Bowl.

Alabama concluded the regular season with a victory in the Iron Bowl vs. Auburn, giving it a final regular season record of 7–4. The appearance marked the first for Alabama in the Fiesta Bowl.

Stallings, who was fired by the National Football League's Phoenix Cardinals with five games remaining in the 1989 season, coached in college for the first time since leading Texas A&M in 1971.

=== Louisville ===
The Cardinals, known mostly for their basketball prowess under Denny Crum, enjoyed their finest football season to date under Louisville native Howard Schnellenberger, who was an assistant under Bryant with Stallings before the latter was named head coach at Texas A&M in 1965.

== Controversy ==
The game was marred by the controversy surrounding Arizona voters' rejection of a state holiday in honor of slain civil rights movement leader Martin Luther King Jr., as a number of teams rejected an invitation to play in the game before Alabama agreed. Players on both teams altered their uniforms in King's memory. Louisville players wore a jersey patch reading, "The Dream Lives On" (referencing King's 1963 "I Have a Dream" speech), as well as a helmet decal representing the university's cultural diversity, while Alabama players wore black armbands with "MLK" on them. Additionally, Fiesta Bowl officials staged a halftime tribute to Dr. King. The rejection of Dr. King by the voters of Arizona would later cause the National Football League to withdraw its earlier decision to let Arizona host 1993's Super Bowl XXVII.

== Game summary ==
Cardinals quarterback Browning Nagle started the scoring with a 70-yard touchdown pass to Latrell Ware to give Louisville an early 7–0 lead. Running back Ralph Dawkins scored next on a 5-yard touchdown run to increase Louisville's lead to 13–0. Nagle later threw a 37-yard touchdown pass to Anthony Cummings giving the Cards a 19–0 lead after the 2-point conversion attempt failed. Alabama's next possession resulted in a blocked punt, which Louisville recovered in the end zone for a touchdown. Another failed 2-point conversion kept the lead at 25–0, a huge lead Louisville raced to after one quarter.

In the second quarter, Louisville had the ball again, before backup quarterback Jeff Brohm threw an interception, that was returned 49 yards for an Alabama touchdown. The interception returned for a touchdown cut the lead to 25–7, but those would be the only points Alabama would score the entire game. Louisville's defense shut down the Alabama offense.

In the third quarter, Nagle threw a 19-yard touchdown pass to Anthony Cummings to give Louisville a 32–7 lead. Louisville's last points came in the fourth quarter on a safety, when Alabama's quarterback was called for intentional grounding in the end zone.

Scoring summary

Quarter	Time	Drive			Team	Scoring information	Score	
Quarter	Time	Plays	Yards	TOP	Team	Scoring information	Louisville	Alabama
1	7:35	2	73		Louisville	Latrell Ware 70-yard touchdown reception from Browning Nagle, Klaus Wilmsmeyer kick good	7	0
1	3:40	6	26		Louisville	Ralph Dawkins 5-yard touchdown run, Klaus Wilmsmeyer kick no good (blocked)	13	0
1	00:54	6	77		Louisville	Anthony Cummings 37-yard touchdown reception from Browning Nagle, 2-point pass incomplete	19	0
1	00:01	1	12		Louisville	Ray Buchanan recovery of a blocked punt in the end zone for a touchdown, 2-point pass failed	25	0
2	7:32	1	49		Alabama	Interception returned 49 yards for touchdown by Charles Garner, Philip Doyle kick good	25	7
3	10:17	5	59		Louisville	Anthony Cummings 19-yard touchdown reception from Browning Nagle, Ron Bell kick good	32	7
4	10:16	1	5		Louisville	Safety awarded after Danny Woodson was called for intentional grounding in the endzone	34	7
"TOP" = time of possession. For other American football terms, see Glossary of American football.							34	7
