= 1991 Sugar Bowl =

1991 USF&G Sugar Bowl
- 57th Sugar Bowl
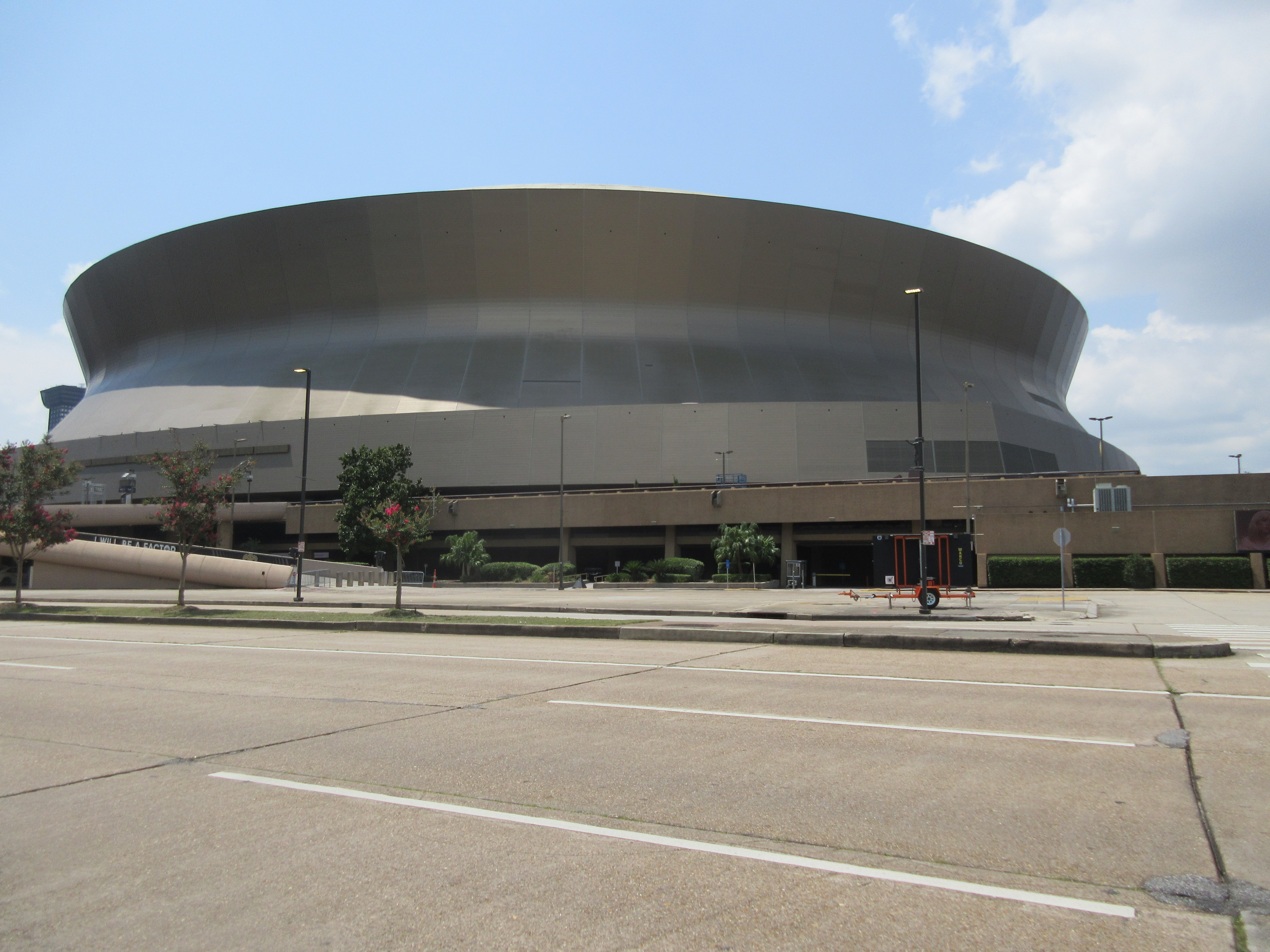
- The Louisiana Superdome in New Orleans, Louisiana, hosted the Sugar Bowl.
Virginia Cavaliers	Tennessee Volunteers
(8–3)	(8–2–2)
ACC	SEC
22	23
Head coach: George Welsh	Head coach: Johnny Majors
	AP / Coaches; 10 / 10
	1	2	3	4	Total
Virginia	9	7	0	6	22
Tennessee	0	0	3	20	23
- Date: January 1, 1991
- Season: 1990
- Stadium: Louisiana Superdome
- Location: New Orleans, Louisiana
- MVP: Andy Kelly (Tennessee QB)
- Favorite: Tennessee by 5 points
- Referee: Dean Cramer (Big Eight)
- Attendance: 75,132

United States TV coverage
- Network: ABC
- Announcers: Al Michaels, Frank Gifford, and Dan Dierdorf

The 1991 Sugar Bowl was the 57th edition of the college football bowl game, played at the Louisiana Superdome in New Orleans, Louisiana, on Tuesday, January 1. Part of the 1990–91 bowl game season, it matched the unranked Virginia Cavaliers of the Atlantic Coast Conference (ACC) and the #10 Tennessee Volunteers of the Southeastern Conference (SEC).

Favored Tennessee rallied with three touchdowns in the fourth quarter to win by a point, 23–22.

== Teams ==
=== Virginia ===
The Cavaliers opened with seven straight wins and were ranked #1 in the AP Poll for the first time in school history, but a loss to Georgia Tech dropped them to eleventh; consecutive losses to Maryland and at rival Virginia Tech dropped them out of the poll completely, as Virginia finished third in the Atlantic Coast Conference and had lost three of four entering their first (and only) Sugar Bowl appearance.

=== Tennessee ===
Tennessee was appearing in its seventh Sugar Bowl, but the first in five years. The Vols were champion of the Southeastern Conference for the second straight year due to Florida being on probation, and were as ranked as high as third until a loss to Alabama. They had started 4–0–2 before falling to Notre Dame and Alabama, with a win in between. The Volunteers ended the regular season with three wins and were ranked in the AP Top 10 for the second straight year.

== Game summary ==
The game kicked off shortly after 7:30 p.m. CST, following the Rose Bowl on ABC, and shortly after the start of the Orange Bowl on NBC, which matched top-ranked Colorado and #5 Notre Dame.

Less than six minutes into the game, Gary Steele scored from ten yards out for the Cavaliers to give them an early lead, though the kick was blocked. After the Vols punted the ball away, Jake McInerney added on to the lead with a field goal to make it 9–0. The Volunteers tried to strike back on their next drive, but quarterback Andy Kelly's pass was intercepted by Tyrone Lewis and the Cavaliers went to work once again, driving eighty yards in seven minutes, concluding with a Terry Kirby touchdown run that gave Virginia (who had forced three turnovers and had the ball for over 22 minutes) a 16–0 lead at halftime.

The second half started off small for Tennessee, with Greg Burke's 27-yard field goal to get on the scoreboard. The rest of the quarter was scoreless, but the fourth quarter saw 26 combined points, starting with a Virginia turnover that led to a Tennessee touchdown 94 yards later on a Tony Thompson run. McInerney added in his second field goal of the game extend the lead to 19–10. Kelly's touchdown pass to Carl Pickens closed it to 19–17. Virginia could only muster up another McInerney field goal, a five-point lead with 2:31 left. Kelly led the Vols down the field, driving 79 yards in two minutes, completing seven of nine passes for 64 yards. It ended with a one-yard Thompson touchdown run that gave Tennessee its first lead with 31 seconds remaining, although the two-point conversion pass attempt failed. Kelly went 24 for 35 with 273 yards, two interceptions, but one touchdown, and was named the game's MVP.

=== Scoring ===
First quarter

- Virginia – Gary Steele 10-yard run (kick blocked)
- Virginia – Jake McInerney 22-yard field goal

Second quarter

- Virginia – Terry Kirby 1-yard run (McInerney kick)

Third quarter

- Tennessee – Greg Burke 27-yard field goal

Fourth quarter

- Tennessee – Tony Thompson 7-yard run (Burke kick)
- Virginia – McInerney 43-yard field goal
- Tennessee – Carl Pickens 15-yard pass from Andy Kelly (Burke kick)
- Virginia – McInerney 44-yard field goal
- Tennessee – Thompson 1-yard run (pass failed)

== Statistics ==
Statistics	Virginia	Tennessee
First downs	25	28
Rushes–yards	58–287	38–191
Passing yards	62	273
Passes	9–24–3	24–35–2
Total offense	82–349	73–464
Return yards	0	51
Punts–average	1–48	2–20
Fumbles–lost	1–0	1–1
Turnovers	3	3
Penalties–yards	5–30	5–65
Time of possession	36:28	23:32

== Aftermath ==
Both teams climbed in the final AP poll; Tennessee went from tenth to eighth, and Virginia from unranked to 23rd.

Through 2026, neither team has returned to the Sugar Bowl.
