= List of Virginia Cavaliers bowl games =

The Virginia Cavaliers college football team competes as part of the NCAA Division I Football Bowl Subdivision (FBS), representing the University of Virginia in the Coastal Division of the Atlantic Coast Conference (ACC). Since the establishment of the team in 1888, Virginia has appeared in 22 bowl games. The latest bowl occurred on December 27, 2025, when Virginia defeated Missouri 13-7 in the 2025 Gator Bowl. The win in that game brought the Cavaliers' overall bowl record to nine wins and thirteen losses (9–13).

== Key ==
General
†	Bowl game record attendance
‡	Former bowl game record attendance

Results
W	Win
L	Loss

== Bowl games ==
List of bowl games showing bowl played in, score, date, season, opponent, stadium, location, attendance and head coach (Note: Statistics correct as of 2019–20 NCAA football bowl games.)
#	Bowl	Score (Note: Results are sortable first by whether the result was a Virginia win, loss or tie and then second by the margin of victory.)	Date	Season (Note: Links to the season article for the Virginia team that competed in the bowl for that year.)	Opponent (Note: Links to the season article for the opponent that Virginia competed against in the bowl for that year when available or to their general page when unavailable.)	Stadium	Location	Attendance	Head coach
1	Peach Bowl (Note: The Chick-fil-A Bowl has been known as: the Peach Bowl (1968–1996); Chick-fil-A Peach Bowl (1997–2005); Chick-fil-A Bowl (since 2006).)	W 27–24	December 31, 1984	1984	Purdue Boilermakers	Atlanta–Fulton County Stadium	Atlanta	41,107	George Welsh
2	All-American Bowl	W 22–16	December 22, 1987	1987	BYU Cougars	Legion Field	Birmingham	37,000	George Welsh
3	Florida Citrus Bowl	L 31–21	January 1, 1990	1989	Illinois Fighting Illini	Florida Citrus Bowl	Orlando	60,016	George Welsh
4	Sugar Bowl	L 23–22	January 1, 1991	1990	Tennessee Volunteers	Louisiana Superdome	New Orleans	75,132	George Welsh
5	Gator Bowl	L 48–14	December 29, 1991	1991	Oklahoma Sooners	Gator Bowl	Jacksonville	62,003	George Welsh
6	Carquest Bowl (Note: The Russell Athletic Bowl has been known as: the Blockbuster Bowl (1990–1993); Carquest Bowl (1994–1997); Micron PC Bowl (1998); MicronPC.com Bowl (1999–2000); Visit Florida Tangerine Bowl (2001); Mazda Tangerine Bowl (2002–2003); Champs Sports Bowl (2004–2011); and Russell Athletic Bowl (since 2012).)	L 48–14	January 1, 1994	1993	Boston College Eagles	Joe Robbie Stadium (Note: Originally called Joe Robbie Stadium, in 1996 it was renamed Pro Player Stadium after naming rights were sold, and it retained the Pro Player moniker through the 2005 season. Today it is known as Hard Rock Stadium.)	Miami Gardens	38,516	George Welsh
7	Independence Bowl	W 20–10	December 28, 1994	1994	TCU Horned Frogs	Independence Stadium	Shreveport	27,242	George Welsh
8	Peach Bowl	W 34–27	December 30, 1995	1995	Georgia Bulldogs	Georgia Dome	Atlanta	70,825^{‡}	George Welsh
9	Carquest Bowl	L 31–21	December 27, 1996	1996	Miami Hurricanes	Joe Robbie Stadium	Miami Gardens	46,418	George Welsh
10	Peach Bowl	L 35–33	December 31, 1998	1998	Georgia Bulldogs	Georgia Dome	Atlanta	72,876^{‡}	George Welsh
11	MicronPC Bowl	L 63–21	December 30, 1999	1999	Illinois Fighting Illini	Pro Player Stadium	Miami Gardens	31,089	George Welsh
12	Oahu Bowl	L 37–14	December 24, 2000	2000	Georgia Bulldogs	Aloha Stadium	Honolulu	24,187	George Welsh
13	Continental Tire Bowl	W 48–22	December 28, 2002	2002	West Virginia Mountaineers	Ericsson Stadium	Charlotte	73,535^{‡}	Al Groh
14	Continental Tire Bowl	W 23–16	December 27, 2003	2003	Pittsburgh Panthers	Ericsson Stadium	Charlotte	51,236	Al Groh
15	MPC Computers Bowl	L 37–34	December 27, 2004	2004	Fresno State Bulldogs	Bronco Stadium	Boise	28,516	Al Groh
16	Music City Bowl	W 34–31	December 30, 2005	2005	Minnesota Golden Gophers	The Coliseum	Nashville	40,519	Al Groh
17	Gator Bowl	L 31–28	January 1, 2008	2007	Texas Tech Red Raiders	Jacksonville Municipal Stadium	Jacksonville	60,243	Al Groh
18	Chick-fil-A Bowl	L 43–24	December 31, 2011	2011	Auburn Tigers	Georgia Dome	Atlanta	72,919	Mike London
19	Military Bowl	L 49–7	December 28, 2017	2017	Navy Midshipmen	Navy–Marine Corps Memorial Stadium	Annapolis	35,921	Bronco Mendenhall
20	Belk Bowl	W 28–0	December 29, 2018	2018	South Carolina Gamecocks	Bank of America Stadium	Charlotte	48,263	Bronco Mendenhall
21	Orange Bowl	L 36–28	December 30, 2019	2019	Florida Gators	Hard Rock Stadium	Miami Gardens	65,157	Bronco Mendenhall
22	Gator Bowl	W 13–7	December 27, 2025	2025	Missouri Tigers	EverBank Stadium	Jacksonville		Tony Elliott
