= 1990 Vanderbilt Commodores football team =

American college football season

1990 Vanderbilt Commodores football
- Conference: Southeastern Conference
- Record: 1–10 (1–6 SEC)
- Head coach: Watson Brown (5th season)
- Offensive coordinator: Steve Sloan (1st season)
- Defensive coordinator: Doug Mathews (1st season)
- Home stadium: Vanderbilt Stadium

1990 Southeastern Conference football standings
	Conf.					Overall
Team	W		L		T	W		L		T
No. 13 Florida ^{*}	6	–	1	–	0	9	–	2	–	0
No. 8 Tennessee $	5	–	1	–	1	9	–	2	–	2
No. 21 Ole Miss	5	–	2	–	0	9	–	3	–	0
Alabama	5	–	2	–	0	7	–	5	–	0
No. 19 Auburn	4	–	2	–	1	8	–	3	–	1
Kentucky	3	–	4	–	0	4	–	7	–	0
LSU	2	–	5	–	0	5	–	6	–	0
Georgia	2	–	5	–	0	4	–	7	–	0
Mississippi State	1	–	6	–	0	5	–	6	–	0
Vanderbilt	1	–	6	–	0	1	–	10	–	0
$ – Conference champion; ^{*} Florida ineligible for SEC championship due to NCAA probation.; Rankings from AP Poll

The 1990 Vanderbilt Commodores football team represented Vanderbilt University in the 1990 NCAA Division I-A football season as a member of the Southeastern Conference (SEC). The Commodores were led by head coach Watson Brown in his fifth season and final season at his Alma mater. With a record of one win and ten losses (1–10 overall, 1–6 in the SEC).

This was Vanderbilt's 101st year of playing football. It took Vanderbilt 50 years to make it to the 100 loss mark, and in the next 50 years Vanderbilt, would lose another 300 football games. In Vanderbilt's 3rd game of the 1990 season they lost to Alabama for the school's 400th all time loss.

== Schedule ==
Date	Time	Opponent	Site	TV	Result	Attendance	Source
September 8		at SMU*	Ownby Stadium; University Park, TX		L 7–44	18,700	
September 22	11:30 a.m.	LSU	Vanderbilt Stadium; Nashville, TN	TBS	W 24–21	33,149	
September 29	1:30 p.m.	at Alabama	Bryant–Denny Stadium; Tuscaloosa, AL	PPV	L 28–59	70,123	
October 6	6:00 p.m.	Syracuse*	Vanderbilt Stadium; Nashville, TN		L 14–49	30,037	
October 13	12:30 p.m.	at No. 6 Auburn	Jordan-Hare Stadium; Auburn, AL		L 6–56	79,269	
October 20	12:00 p.m.	at Georgia	Sanford Stadium; Athens, GA (rivalry)		L 28–39	81,640	
October 27	1:30 p.m.	No. 17 Ole Miss	Vanderbilt Stadium; Nashville, TN (rivalry)		L 13–14	38,704	
November 10		at Kentucky	Commonwealth Stadium; Lexington, KY (rivalry)		L 21–28	50,400	
November 17		Army*	Vanderbilt Stadium; Nashville, TN		L 38–42	30,941	
November 24	1:00 p.m.	Wake Forest*	Vanderbilt Stadium; Nashville, TN		L 28–56	21,116	
December 1	1:30 p.m.	No. 12 Tennessee	Vanderbilt Stadium; Nashville, TN (rivalry)	PPV	L 20–49	41,492	
*Non-conference game; Rankings from AP Poll released prior to the game; All times are in Central time
