= 1990 Mississippi State Bulldogs football team =

American college football season

1990 Mississippi State Bulldogs football
- Conference: Southeastern Conference
- Record: 5–6 (1–6 SEC)
- Head coach: Rockey Felker (5th season)
- Offensive coordinator: Bill Clay (1st season)
- Defensive coordinator: Jim Carmody (2nd season)
- Home stadium: Scott Field; Mississippi Veterans Memorial Stadium

1990 Southeastern Conference football standings
	Conf.					Overall
Team	W		L		T	W		L		T
No. 13 Florida ^{*}	6	–	1	–	0	9	–	2	–	0
No. 8 Tennessee $	5	–	1	–	1	9	–	2	–	2
No. 21 Ole Miss	5	–	2	–	0	9	–	3	–	0
Alabama	5	–	2	–	0	7	–	5	–	0
No. 19 Auburn	4	–	2	–	1	8	–	3	–	1
Kentucky	3	–	4	–	0	4	–	7	–	0
LSU	2	–	5	–	0	5	–	6	–	0
Georgia	2	–	5	–	0	4	–	7	–	0
Mississippi State	1	–	6	–	0	5	–	6	–	0
Vanderbilt	1	–	6	–	0	1	–	10	–	0
$ – Conference champion; ^{*} Florida ineligible for SEC championship due to NCAA probation.; Rankings from AP Poll

The 1990 Mississippi State Bulldogs football team represented Mississippi State University as member of the Southeastern Conference (SEC) during the 1990 NCAA Division I-A football season. Led by fifth-year head coach Rockey Felker, the Bulldogs compiled a record of 5–6, with a mark of 1–6 in conference play, and finished tied for ninth in the SEC.

Head coach Felker was fired after the season, the Bulldogs' fourth consecutive losing season.

The LSU game was Mississippi State's last home contest at Jackson's Mississippi Veterans Memorial Stadium. The Bulldogs' last game there was the Egg Bowl vs. Ole Miss, which was played at Jackson from 1973-90, the next week (the Rebels were the designated home team).

== Schedule ==
Date	Time	Opponent	Site	TV	Result	Attendance	Source
September 8	11:30 a.m.	No. 8 Tennessee	Scott Field; Starkville, MS		L 7–40	32,114	
September 15		Cal State Fullerton*	Scott Field; Starkville, MS		W 27–13	22,240	
September 22		Southern Miss*	Scott Field; Starkville, MS		W 13–10	40,115	
September 29		at No. 17 Florida	Ben Hill Griffin Stadium; Gainesville, FL	TBS	L 21–34	72,943	
October 13		at Kentucky	Commonwealth Stadium; Lexington, KY		L 15–17	56,375	
October 20		at Tulane*	Louisiana Superdome; New Orleans, LA		W 38–17	22,826	
October 27	1:30 p.m.	No. 2 Auburn	Scott Field; Starkville, MS	WTBS	L 16–17	39,106	
November 3	11:30 a.m.	Alabama	Scott Field; Starkville, MS (rivalry)		L 0–22	39,252	
November 10		at Memphis State*	Liberty Bowl Memorial Stadium; Memphis, TN		W 27–23	21,105	
November 17	1:30 p.m.	LSU	Mississippi Veterans Memorial Stadium; Jackson, MS (rivalry)	PPV	W 34–22	22,509	
November 24	1:30 p.m.	vs. No. 21 Ole Miss	Mississippi Veterans Memorial Stadium; Jackson, MS (Egg Bowl)		L 9–21	56,652	
*Non-conference game; Rankings from AP Poll released prior to the game; All times are in Central time
