= 1990 Ole Miss Rebels football team =

American college football season

1990 Ole Miss Rebels football

Gator Bowl, L 3–35 vs. Michigan
- Conference: Southeastern Conference

Ranking
- Coaches: No. 23
- AP: No. 21
- Record: 9–3 (5–2 SEC)
- Head coach: Billy Brewer (8th season)
- Offensive coordinator: Red Parker (3rd season)
- Defensive coordinator: Robert Henry (3rd season)
- Home stadium: Vaught–Hemingway Stadium; Mississippi Veterans Memorial Stadium

1990 Southeastern Conference football standings
	Conf.					Overall
Team	W		L		T	W		L		T
No. 13 Florida ^{*}	6	–	1	–	0	9	–	2	–	0
No. 8 Tennessee $	5	–	1	–	1	9	–	2	–	2
No. 21 Ole Miss	5	–	2	–	0	9	–	3	–	0
Alabama	5	–	2	–	0	7	–	5	–	0
No. 19 Auburn	4	–	2	–	1	8	–	3	–	1
Kentucky	3	–	4	–	0	4	–	7	–	0
LSU	2	–	5	–	0	5	–	6	–	0
Georgia	2	–	5	–	0	4	–	7	–	0
Mississippi State	1	–	6	–	0	5	–	6	–	0
Vanderbilt	1	–	6	–	0	1	–	10	–	0
$ – Conference champion; ^{*} Florida ineligible for SEC championship due to NCAA probation.; Rankings from AP Poll

The 1990 Ole Miss Rebels football team represented the University of Mississippi as a member of the Southeastern Conference during the 1990 NCAA Division I-A football season. Led by eighth-year head coach Billy Brewer, the Rebels compiled an overall record of 9–3, with a mark of 5–2 in conference play, and finished tied for third place in the SEC.

== Schedule ==
Date	Time	Opponent	Rank	Site	TV	Result	Attendance	Source
September 8	7:30 p.m.	Memphis State*		Vaught–Hemingway Stadium; Oxford, MS (rivalry)		W 23–21	41,300	
September 15	1:00 p.m.	No. 2 Auburn		Mississippi Veterans Memorial Stadium; Jackson, MS (rivalry)		L 10–24	41,500	
September 22	12:00 p.m.	at No. 13 Arkansas*		War Memorial Stadium; Little Rock, AR (rivalry)	Raycom	W 21–17	54,890	
September 29	1:00 p.m.	Tulane*		Vaught–Hemingway Stadium; Oxford, MS (rivalry)		W 31–21	20,500	
October 6	11:30 a.m.	Kentucky		Vaught–Hemingway Stadium; Oxford, MS	TBS	W 35–29	27,000	
October 13	11:30 a.m.	at Georgia	No. 24	Sanford Stadium; Athens, GA	TBS	W 28–12	78,321	
October 20	1:00 p.m.	Arkansas State*^{†}	No. 18	Vaught–Hemingway Stadium; Oxford, MS		W 42–13	39,000	
October 27	1:30 p.m.	at Vanderbilt	No. 17	Vanderbilt Stadium; Nashville, TN (rivalry)		W 14–13	38,704	
November 3	7:00 p.m.	at LSU	No. 17	Tiger Stadium; Baton Rouge, LA (rivalry)	PPV	W 19–10	79,634	
November 17	3:30 p.m.	vs. No. 14 Tennessee	No. 15	Liberty Bowl Memorial Stadium; Memphis, TN (rivalry)	CBS	L 13–22	66,467	
November 24	1:30 p.m.	vs. Mississippi State	No. 21	Mississippi Veterans Memorial Stadium; Jackson, MS (Egg Bowl)		W 21–9	56,652	
January 1	10:30 a.m.	vs. No. 12 Michigan*	No. 15	Gator Bowl; Jacksonville, FL (Gator Bowl)	ESPN	L 3–35	68,297	
*Non-conference game; ^{†}Homecoming; Rankings from AP Poll released prior to the game; All times are in Central time

== Season summary ==
=== at Arkansas ===
External videos
- 1990 Ole Miss highlights vs. Arkansas

== Personnel ==
1990 Ole Miss Rebels football team roster
Players
Coaches
Offense

Pos.	#	Name	Class
QB	17	Tom Luke	So
QB		Russ Shows	So
WR	5	Vincent Brownlee

Defense

Pos.	#	Name	Class

Special teams

Pos.	#	Name	Class

Head coach

- Billy Brewer

Coordinators/assistant coaches

- Red Parker (OC)
- Robert Henry (DC)
- Charlie Strong (WR)

Legend

- (C) Team captain
- (S) Suspended
- (I) Ineligible
- Injured
- Redshirt
