= 1990 Kentucky Wildcats football team =

American college football season

1990 Kentucky Wildcats football
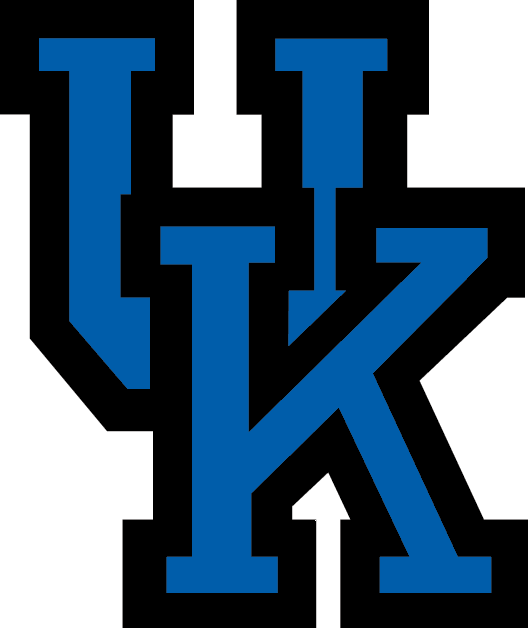
- Conference: Southeastern Conference
- Record: 4–7 (3–4 SEC)
- Head coach: Bill Curry (1st season)
- Offensive coordinator: Tommy Bowden (1st season)
- Offensive scheme: Multiple
- Defensive coordinator: Larry New (1st season)
- Base defense: 4–3
- Home stadium: Commonwealth Stadium

1990 Southeastern Conference football standings
	Conf.					Overall
Team	W		L		T	W		L		T
No. 13 Florida ^{*}	6	–	1	–	0	9	–	2	–	0
No. 8 Tennessee $	5	–	1	–	1	9	–	2	–	2
No. 21 Ole Miss	5	–	2	–	0	9	–	3	–	0
Alabama	5	–	2	–	0	7	–	5	–	0
No. 19 Auburn	4	–	2	–	1	8	–	3	–	1
Kentucky	3	–	4	–	0	4	–	7	–	0
LSU	2	–	5	–	0	5	–	6	–	0
Georgia	2	–	5	–	0	4	–	7	–	0
Mississippi State	1	–	6	–	0	5	–	6	–	0
Vanderbilt	1	–	6	–	0	1	–	10	–	0
$ – Conference champion; ^{*} Florida ineligible for SEC championship due to NCAA probation.; Rankings from AP Poll

The 1990 Kentucky Wildcats football team represented the University of Kentucky in the Southeastern Conference (SEC) during the 1990 NCAA Division I-A football season. In their first season under head coach Bill Curry, the Wildcats compiled a 4–7 record (3–4 against SEC opponents), finished in sixth place in the SEC, and were outscored by their opponents, 316 to 228. The team played its home games in Commonwealth Stadium in Lexington, Kentucky.

The team's statistical leaders included Freddie Maggard with 1,055 passing yards, Al Baker with 780 rushing yards, and Phil Logan with 565 receiving yards.

Bill Curry had been the head football coach at Alabama from 1987 to 1989, compiling a 26–10 record with the Crimson Tide. He was the SEC Coach of the Year in 1989. He was hired by Kentucky in January 1990.

== Schedule ==
Date	Time	Opponent	Site	TV	Result	Attendance	Source
September 1		Central Michigan*	Commonwealth Stadium; Lexington, KY		W 20–17	57,550	
September 8		at Rutgers*	Giants Stadium; East Rutherford, NJ		L 8–24	21,141	
September 15		Indiana*	Commonwealth Stadium; Lexington, KY (rivalry)		L 24–45	58,150	
September 22	1:30 p.m.	at North Carolina*	Kenan Memorial Stadium; Chapel Hill, NC		L 13–16	43,000	
October 6	12:30 p.m.	at Ole Miss	Vaught–Hemingway Stadium; Oxford, MS	TBS	L 29–35	27,000	
October 13		Mississippi State	Commonwealth Stadium; Lexington, KY		W 17–15	56,375	
October 20	8:00 p.m.	at LSU	Tiger Stadium; Baton Rouge, LA		L 20–30	64,720	
October 27	8:00 p.m.	Georgia	Commonwealth Stadium; Lexington, KY		W 26–24	55,255	
November 10		Vanderbilt	Commonwealth Stadium; Lexington, KY (rivalry)		W 28–21	50,400	
November 17		No. 6 Florida	Commonwealth Stadium; Lexington, KY (rivalry)	TBS	L 15–47	55,140	
November 24	1:30 p.m.	at No. 14 Tennessee	Neyland Stadium; Knoxville, TN (rivalry)	TBS	L 28–42	92,243	
*Non-conference game; Rankings from AP Poll released prior to the game; All times are in Eastern time

== Roster ==
1990 Kentucky Wildcats football team roster
Players
Coaches
Offense

Pos.	#	Name	Class
[[American football positions|]]
[[American football positions|]]

Defense

Pos.	#	Name	Class
[[American football positions|]]

Special teams

Pos.	#	Name	Class

}}

Head coach

- [[]]

Coordinators/assistant coaches

Legend

- (C) Team captain
- (S) Suspended
- (I) Ineligible
- Injured
- Redshirt
