= 1990 NCAA Division I-A football season =

American college football season

1990 NCAA Division I-A season
- Number of teams: 106
- Preseason AP No. 1: Miami (FL)

Postseason
- Duration: December 8, 1990 – January 1, 1991
- Bowl games: 19
- AP Poll No. 1: Colorado
- Coaches Poll No. 1: Georgia Tech
- Heisman Trophy: BYU quarterback Ty Detmer
- Champion(s): Georgia Tech (Coaches)

Division I-A football seasons
- ← 1989 1991 →

The 1990 NCAA Division I-A football season ended with a split national championship and the ensuing controversy helped lead to the creation of the Bowl Coalition, a precursor to the Bowl Championship Series. The national title was split between the Colorado Buffaloes and the Georgia Tech Yellow Jackets. The Buffaloes (11–1–1) took the AP poll while the Yellow Jackets (11–0–1) took the UPI Coaches poll by one vote over Colorado, 847 to 846. During the season Colorado had a particularly controversial victory over Missouri in what would later be known as the "Fifth Down Game". It was finally confirmed that Tom Osborne changed his first-place vote from Colorado to Georgia Tech, which would be the only time a coach changed his vote from the pre-bowl #1 after that #1 team won their bowl game. Unlike several seasons to come in the 1990s, the two teams that became split national champions could have actually met in a 1 vs. 2 bowl game. Georgia Tech's ACC champion status did not preclude them from taking their #2 ranking to the Orange Bowl to face the automatic Big-8 champion in #1 Colorado for a decisive title game. But the Orange Bowl committee had invited Notre Dame Fighting Irish when they were ranked #1 prior to their second loss of the season on November 17.

== Rule changes ==
- Approved reducing the width of the goal posts from 23 feet 9 inches to 18 feet 6 inches starting in 1991.
- Mandated visible 25-second clocks at each end zone.
- Allowed the defense to advance fumbles that occur beyond the line of scrimmage. Previously, fumbles could only be advanced if they were caught in the air.

== Conference standings ==
1990 Atlantic Coast Conference football standings
	Conf.					Overall
Team	W		L		T	W		L		T
No. 2 Georgia Tech $	6	–	0	–	1	11	–	0	–	1
No. 9 Clemson	5	–	2	–	0	10	–	2	–	0
No. 23 Virginia	5	–	2	–	0	8	–	4	–	0
Maryland	4	–	3	–	0	6	–	5	–	1
North Carolina	3	–	3	–	1	6	–	4	–	1
NC State	3	–	4	–	0	7	–	5	–	0
Duke	1	–	6	–	0	4	–	7	–	0
Wake Forest	0	–	7	–	0	3	–	8	–	0
$ – Conference champion; Rankings from AP Poll

1990 Big Eight Conference football standings
	Conf.					Overall
Team	W		L		T	W		L		T
No. 1 Colorado $	7	–	0	–	0	11	–	1	–	1
No. 24 Nebraska	5	–	2	–	0	9	–	3	–	0
No. 17 Oklahoma	5	–	2	–	0	8	–	3	–	0
Iowa State	2	–	4	–	1	4	–	6	–	1
Kansas	2	–	4	–	1	3	–	7	–	1
Kansas State	2	–	5	–	0	5	–	6	–	0
Missouri	2	–	5	–	0	4	–	7	–	0
Oklahoma State	2	–	5	–	0	4	–	7	–	0
$ – Conference champion; Rankings from AP Poll

1990 Big Ten Conference football standings
	Conf.					Overall
Team	W		L		T	W		L		T
No. 7 Michigan +	6	–	2	–	0	9	–	3	–	0
No. 16 Michigan State +	6	–	2	–	0	8	–	3	–	1
No. 25 Illinois +	6	–	2	–	0	8	–	4	–	0
No. 18 Iowa +	6	–	2	–	0	8	–	4	–	0
Ohio State	5	–	2	–	1	7	–	4	–	1
Minnesota	5	–	3	–	0	6	–	5	–	0
Indiana	3	–	4	–	1	6	–	5	–	1
Northwestern	1	–	7	–	0	2	–	9	–	0
Purdue	1	–	7	–	0	2	–	9	–	0
Wisconsin	0	–	8	–	0	1	–	10	–	0
+ – Conference co-champions; Rankings from AP Poll

1990 Big West Conference football standings
	Conf.					Overall
Team	W		L		T	W		L		T
San Jose State $	7	–	0	–	0	9	–	2	–	1
Fresno State	5	–	1	–	1	8	–	2	–	1
Utah State	5	–	1	–	1	5	–	5	–	1
Long Beach State	4	–	3	–	0	6	–	5	–	0
UNLV	3	–	4	–	0	4	–	7	–	0
Pacific (CA)	2	–	5	–	0	4	–	7	–	0
New Mexico State	1	–	6	–	0	1	–	10	–	0
Cal State Fullerton	0	–	7	–	0	1	–	11	–	0
$ – Conference champion

1990 Mid-American Conference football standings
	Conf.					Overall
Team	W		L		T	W		L		T
Toledo +	7	–	1	–	0	9	–	2	–	0
Central Michigan +	7	–	1	–	0	8	–	3	–	1
Ball State	5	–	3	–	0	7	–	4	–	0
Western Michigan	5	–	3	–	0	7	–	4	–	0
Miami (OH)	4	–	3	–	1	5	–	5	–	1
Bowling Green	2	–	4	–	2	3	–	5	–	2
Eastern Michigan	2	–	6	–	0	2	–	9	–	0
Kent State	2	–	6	–	0	2	–	9	–	0
Ohio	0	–	7	–	1	1	–	9	–	1
+ – Conference co-champions

1990 Pacific-10 Conference football standings
	Conf.					Overall
Team	W		L		T	W		L		T
No. 5 Washington $	7	–	1	–	0	10	–	2	–	0
No. 20 USC	5	–	2	–	1	8	–	4	–	1
Oregon	4	–	3	–	0	8	–	4	–	0
California	4	–	3	–	1	7	–	4	–	1
Arizona	5	–	4	–	0	7	–	5	–	0
UCLA	4	–	4	–	0	5	–	6	–	0
Stanford	4	–	4	–	0	5	–	6	–	0
Arizona State	2	–	5	–	0	4	–	7	–	0
Washington State	2	–	6	–	0	3	–	8	–	0
Oregon State	1	–	6	–	0	1	–	10	–	0
$ – Conference champion; Rankings from AP Poll

1990 Southeastern Conference football standings
	Conf.					Overall
Team	W		L		T	W		L		T
No. 13 Florida ^{*}	6	–	1	–	0	9	–	2	–	0
No. 8 Tennessee $	5	–	1	–	1	9	–	2	–	2
No. 21 Ole Miss	5	–	2	–	0	9	–	3	–	0
Alabama	5	–	2	–	0	7	–	5	–	0
No. 19 Auburn	4	–	2	–	1	8	–	3	–	1
Kentucky	3	–	4	–	0	4	–	7	–	0
LSU	2	–	5	–	0	5	–	6	–	0
Georgia	2	–	5	–	0	4	–	7	–	0
Mississippi State	1	–	6	–	0	5	–	6	–	0
Vanderbilt	1	–	6	–	0	1	–	10	–	0
$ – Conference champion; ^{*} Florida ineligible for SEC championship due to NCAA probation.; Rankings from AP Poll

1990 Southwest Conference football standings
	Conf.					Overall
Team	W		L		T	W		L		T
No. 12 Texas $	8	–	0	–	0	10	–	2	–	0
No. 10 Houston	7	–	1	–	0	10	–	1	–	0
No. 15 Texas A&M	5	–	2	–	1	9	–	3	–	1
Baylor	5	–	2	–	1	6	–	4	–	1
Rice	3	–	5	–	0	5	–	6	–	0
TCU	3	–	5	–	0	5	–	6	–	0
Texas Tech	3	–	5	–	0	4	–	7	–	0
Arkansas	1	–	7	–	0	3	–	8	–	0
SMU	0	–	8	–	0	1	–	10	–	0
$ – Conference champion; Rankings from AP Poll

1990 Western Athletic Conference football standings
	Conf.					Overall
Team	W		L		T	W		L		T
No. 22 BYU $	7	–	1	–	0	10	–	3	–	0
Colorado State	6	–	1	–	0	9	–	4	–	0
San Diego State	5	–	2	–	0	6	–	5	–	0
Wyoming	5	–	3	–	0	9	–	4	–	0
Hawaii	4	–	4	–	0	7	–	5	–	0
Air Force	3	–	4	–	0	7	–	5	–	0
Utah	2	–	6	–	0	4	–	7	–	0
New Mexico	1	–	6	–	0	2	–	10	–	0
UTEP	1	–	7	–	0	3	–	8	–	0
$ – Conference champion; Rankings from AP Poll

1990 NCAA Division I-A independents football records
	Conf.			Overall
Team	W	L	T	W		L		T
No. 14 Louisville		–		10	–	1	–	1
No. 3 Miami (FL)		–		10	–	2	–	0
No. 4 Florida State		–		10	–	2	–	0
No. 6 Notre Dame		–		9	–	3	–	0
No. 11 Penn State		–		9	–	3	–	0
Louisiana Tech		–		8	–	3	–	1
Southern Miss		–		8	–	4	–	0
Temple		–		7	–	4	–	0
Syracuse		–		7	–	4	–	2
Army		–		6	–	5	–	0
Northern Illinois		–		6	–	5	–	0
South Carolina		–		6	–	5	–	0
Virginia Tech		–		6	–	5	–	0
East Carolina		–		5	–	6	–	0
Southwestern Louisiana		–		5	–	6	–	0
Navy		–		5	–	6	–	0
Memphis State		–		4	–	6	–	1
Boston College		–		4	–	7	–	0
Tulane		–		4	–	7	–	0
West Virginia		–		4	–	7	–	0
Akron		–		3	–	7	–	1
Pittsburgh		–		3	–	7	–	1
Rutgers		–		3	–	8	–	0
Tulsa		–		3	–	8	–	0
Cincinnati		–		1	–	10	–	0
Rankings from AP Poll

== Bowl games ==
New Year's Day Bowls:

- Orange Bowl: No. 1 Colorado 10, No. 5 Notre Dame 9
- Florida Citrus Bowl: No. 2 Georgia Tech 45, No. 19 Nebraska 21
- Cotton Bowl: No. 4 Miami (FL) 46, No. 3 Texas 3
- Rose Bowl: No. 8 Washington 46, No. 17 Iowa 34
- Sugar Bowl: No. 10 Tennessee 23, Virginia 22
- Gator Bowl: No. 12 Michigan 35, No. 15 Mississippi 3
- Hall of Fame Bowl: No. 14 Clemson 30, No. 16 Illinois 0
- Fiesta Bowl: No. 18 Louisville 34, No. 25 Alabama 7

Other Bowls:

- John Hancock Bowl: No. 22 Michigan St. 17, No. 21 USC 16
- Copper Bowl: California 17, Wyoming 15
- Holiday Bowl: Texas A&M 65, No. 13 Brigham Young 14
- Freedom Bowl: Colorado St. 32, Oregon 31
- Peach Bowl: Auburn 27, Indiana 23
- All-American Bowl: North Carolina St. 31, No. 23 Southern Mississippi 27
- Blockbuster Bowl: No. 6 Florida St. 24, No. 7 Penn St. 17
- Liberty Bowl: Air Force 23, No. 24 Ohio St. 11
- Aloha Bowl: Syracuse 28, Arizona 0
- Independence Bowl: Louisiana Tech 34, Maryland 34
- California Bowl: San Jose St. 48, Central Michigan 24

== Final AP Poll ==
1990 Final AP Poll
	School	Record (W–L–T)	Points
1	Colorado (39)	11–1–1	1,475
2	Georgia Tech (20)	11–0–1	1,441
3	Miami (FL) (1)	10–2–0	1,388
4	Florida State	10–2–0	1,303
5	Washington	10–2–0	1,246
6	Notre Dame	9–3–0	1,179
7	Michigan	9–3–0	1,025
8	Tennessee	9–2–2	993
9	Clemson	10–2–0	950
10	Houston	10–1–0	940
11	Penn State	9–3–0	907
12	Texas	10–2–0	887
13	Florida	9–2–0	863
14	Louisville	10–1–1	775
15	Texas A&M	9–3–1	627
16	Michigan State	8–3–1	610
17	Oklahoma	8–3–0	452
18	Iowa	8–4–0	370
19	Auburn	8–3–1	288
20	Southern California	8–4–1	266
21	Mississippi	9–3–0	253
22	Brigham Young	10–3–0	246
23	Virginia	8–4–0	188
24	Nebraska	9–3–0	185
25	Illinois	8–4–0	146

== Final UPI/Coaches Poll ==
1. Georgia Tech
2. Colorado
3. Miami (FL)
4. Florida State
5. Washington
6. Notre Dame
7. Tennessee
8. Michigan
9. Clemson
10. Penn State
11. Texas
12. Louisville
13. Texas A&M
14. Michigan State
15. Virginia
16. Iowa
17. Brigham Young
18. Nebraska
19. Auburn
20. San Jose State
21. Syracuse
22. USC
23. Mississippi
24. Illinois
25. Virginia Tech
- Florida, Houston and Oklahoma were not eligible to be ranked in the coaches poll due to NCAA probation.

== Heisman Trophy voting ==
The Heisman Trophy is given to the year's most outstanding player

Player	School	Position	1st	2nd	3rd	Total
Ty Detmer	BYU	QB	316	208	118	1,482
Raghib Ismail	Notre Dame	WR	237	174	118	1,177
Eric Bieniemy	Colorado	RB	114	153	150	798
Shawn Moore	Virginia	QB	46	96	135	465
David Klingler	Houston	QB	7	27	50	125
Herman Moore	Virginia	WR	6	14	22	68
Greg Lewis	Washington	RB	4	5	19	41
Craig Erickson	Miami (FL)	QB	0	6	19	31
Darren Lewis	Texas A&M	RB	0	9	13	31
Mike Mayweather	Army	RB	3	4	3	20

== Other major awards ==
- Maxwell Award – Ty Detmer, BYU
- Walter Camp Award – Raghib Ismail, Notre Dame
- O'Brien Award – Ty Detmer, BYU
- Lombardi (Linebacker) – Chris Zorich, Notre Dame
- Outland (Interior) – Russell Maryland, Miami-FL
- AFCA Coach of the Year – Bobby Ross, Georgia Tech

== National title ==
- Colorado Buffaloes – AP Poll
- Georgia Tech Yellow Jackets – UPI Poll

== No. 1 and No. 2 progress ==
WEEKS	No. 1	No. 2	Event	
PRE-1	Miami	Notre Dame	BYU 28, Miami 21	Sep 8
2	Notre Dame	Auburn	Florida St 48, Ga. Southern 6	Sep 15
3–5	Notre Dame	Florida State	Stanford 36, Notre Dame 31	Oct 6
6	Michigan	Virginia	Michigan St. 28, Michigan 27	Oct 13
7	Virginia	Miami	Notre Dame 29, Miami 20	Oct 20
8	Virginia	Auburn	Auburn 17, Miss. St. 16	Oct 27
9	Virginia	Notre Dame	Georgia Tech 41, Virginia 38	Nov 3
10	Notre Dame	Washington	UCLA 25, Washington 22	Nov 10
11	Notre Dame	Colorado	Penn State 24, Notre Dame 21	Nov 17
12	Colorado	Miami	Miami 33, Syracuse 7	Nov 24
13–14	Colorado	Georgia Tech	End regular season	

== I-AA team wins over I-A teams ==
Italics denotes I-AA teams.

Date	Visiting team	Home team	Site	Result	Attendance	Ref.
September 1	Southwest Missouri State	UNLV	Sam Boyd Silver Bowl • Whitney, Nevada	31–24	17,659	
September 1	No. 6 (I-AA) Montana	Oregon State	Parker Stadium • Corvallis, Oregon	22–15	25,201	
September 22	Eastern Michigan	No. 15 (I-AA) Youngstown State	Stambaugh Stadium • Youngstown, Ohio	24–14		
September 29	Akron	No. 12 (I-AA) Youngstown State	Stambaugh Stadium • Youngstown, Ohio (Steel Tire)	28–23	17,001	
October 6	SMU	North Texas	Fouts Field • Denton, Texas (Safeway Bowl)	7–14	22,750	
October 20	The Citadel	South Carolina	Williams–Brice Stadium • Columbia, South Carolina	38–35	63,000	
October 20	No. 3 (I-AA) Nevada	UNLV	Sam Boyd Silver Bowl • Whitney, Nevada (Battle for Nevada)	26–14	22,402	
October 27	James Madison	Navy	Navy–Marine Corps Memorial Stadium • Annapolis, Maryland	16–7	29,129	
November 3	Ohio	No. 5 (I-AA) Youngstown State	Stambaugh Stadium • Youngstown, Ohio	0–27		
^{#}Rankings from AP Poll released prior to game.

== Recap of the year ==
Voters were divided in the first poll of the 1990 college football season. The first rankings reflected the lack of consensus, as No. 1 Miami, No. 2 Notre Dame, No. 3 Auburn, No. 4 Florida State, and No. 5 Colorado each received at least three first-place votes in the preseason poll.

=== Week One: August 26-September 1, 1990 ===
There was little movement in the polls as most teams either played against non-competitive foes or did not begin the season until September 8. The only significant game was a 31–31 tie between No. 5 Colorado and No. 8 Tennessee in the first-ever Pigskin Classic, played at Anaheim Stadium. The next AP Poll featured Miami and Notre Dame still at Nos. 1 and 2, Auburn and Florida State tied at No. 3, and Michigan at No. 5.

=== Week Two: September 8, 1990 ===
The most significant game and slight upset of week two came in Provo, Utah, where No. 16 Brigham Young, led by eventual Heisman Trophy winner Ty Detmer, held off the defending champion, No. 1 Miami Hurricanes, 28–21. No. 2 Notre Dame and No. 5 Michigan, who were scheduled to play each other the following week, had not begun their season. No. 3 Auburn defeated Cal State Fullerton 38-17, while fellow No. 3 Florida State beat East Carolina 45-24. A comeback by No. 6 Colorado staved off defeat against unranked Stanford, 17–14. The pollsters remained unimpressed by Colorado, dropping them to No. 9 despite the win. The Gene Stallings era began for No. 13 Alabama with a 27–24 loss to the Southern Mississippi Golden Eagles, quarterbacked by Brett Favre; the Tide opened their season with three straight losses. The Steve Spurrier era also began at Florida, as the unranked Gators beat Oklahoma State 50-7. In Charlottesville, No. 14 Virginia beat No. 9 Clemson 20-7 in what was viewed as an upset. It was Virginia's first win ever over the Tigers, after 29 consecutive losses since their first meeting in 1955. The top five teams in the next poll were No. 1 Notre Dame, No. 2 Auburn, No. 3 Florida State, No. 4 Michigan, and No. 5 Brigham Young.

=== Week Three: September 15, 1990 ===
The most important game of week three was a top five match-up of No. 1 Notre Dame against No. 4 Michigan. In an exciting game, the Fighting Irish prevailed 28–24. No. 2 Auburn won 24-10 at Mississippi, No. 3 Florida State defeated Georgia Southern 48-6, No. 5 Brigham Young beat Washington State 50-36, and No. 6 USC got past Penn State 19-14. The other game that would have season-long significance was No. 21 Illinois' upset of No. 9 Colorado, 23–22. The game would figure prominently in the national championship argument in January. Spurrier also won his SEC debut, with No. 24 Florida besting Alabama 17–13. The next poll featured No. 1 Notre Dame, No. 2 Florida State, No. 3 Auburn, No. 4 Brigham Young, and No. 5 USC.

=== Week Four: September 22, 1990 ===
No. 1 Notre Dame squeaked past No. 24 Michigan State 20-19, with the crucial moment being a bizarre play where a Rick Mirer pass bounced off the chest of Spartans cornerback Todd Murray and into the hands of receiver Adrian Jarrell, putting the Irish in position to score the game-winning touchdown. No. 2 Florida State won 31-13 at Tulane, while No. 3 Auburn was idle. No. 4 Brigham Young defeated San Diego State 62-34, but No. 5 USC was blasted 31-0 by No. 21 Washington. No. 6 Tennessee, which was idle this week, moved up in the next poll: No. 1 Notre Dame, No. 2 Florida State, No. 3 Auburn, No. 4 Brigham Young, and No. 5 Tennessee.

=== Week Five: September 29, 1990 ===
No. 1 Notre Dame defeated Purdue 37-11, and No. 2 Florida State beat Virginia Tech 39-28. No. 5 Tennessee had their second tie in a little over a month, as No. 3 Auburn rallied from a 17-point deficit to even the score; a missed Volunteers field goal with 15 seconds left led to a 26-26 final tally. No. 4 Brigham Young visited Oregon and lost 32-16. No. 6 Michigan won 45-17 over Maryland, and No. 7 Virginia defeated William & Mary 63-35. The next poll featured No. 1 Notre Dame, No. 2 Florida State, No. 3 Michigan, No. 4 Virginia, and No. 5 Auburn.

=== Week Six: October 6, 1990 ===
The most controversial game of the season—and one of the most controversial of all time—occurred this week, when No. 12 Colorado beat Missouri on a last minute lunge by back-up quarterback Charles Johnson. The problem, however, was that Johnson actually scored on a Fifth Down due to an error by the seven officials calling the game. The game would have major ramifications for the national championship at year's end.

Meanwhile, Stanford's Tommy Vardell scored four touchdowns (all on runs from the one-yard line) to lead the Cardinal to a 36-31 upset of No. 1 Notre Dame. No. 2 Florida State visited No. 9 Miami and lost 31-22. No. 3 Michigan dominated Wisconsin 41-3, while No. 4 Virginia was idle. No. 5 Auburn barely escaped unheralded Louisiana Tech, winning 16-14 on a last-second field goal, and the Tigers fell out of the top five in the next poll. No. 6 Tennessee was also idle, and No. 7 Oklahoma moved up with a 31-17 win at Oklahoma State: No. 1 Michigan, No. 2 Virginia, No. 3 Miami, No. 4 Oklahoma, and No. 5 Tennessee. All of the top five teams received first place votes, as did No. 8 Nebraska, No. 10 Florida, and No. 13 Houston.

=== Week Seven: October 13, 1990 ===
After sitting on top of the college rankings for only four days, Michigan became the third number one team of the year to get knocked off the top spot, losing 28–27 at home in Ann Arbor to archrival Michigan State; the Wolverines failed a two-point conversion with seconds to go as Desmond Howard could not hold on to the ball when he was allegedly interfered with, in a very controversial no-call by the referees. This opened the door for No. 2 Virginia, who moved atop the polls for the first time in team history with a 31-0 shutout of North Carolina State. No. 3 Miami was similarly dominant in a 34-0 win over Kansas. The day's other upset of a top-five team was No. 4 Oklahoma's 14–13 loss to unranked Texas in the Red River Shootout. No. 9 Florida also endured their first loss in the Spurrier era, losing a 45–3 rout at the hands of No. 5 Tennessee despite being down only 7–3 at halftime. No. 18 Georgia Tech knocked off No. 15 Clemson, 21–19, in a game that was to be of greater importance at the end of season. The next poll featured No. 1 Virginia, No. 2 Miami, No. 3 Tennessee, No. 4 Nebraska, and No. 5 Auburn.

=== Week Eight: October 20, 1990 ===
No. 1 Virginia won 49-14 at Wake Forest, but otherwise the season continued to shock as ten of the 25 ranked teams went down to defeat on an unforgettable Saturday. In a battle of national powers, No. 6 Notre Dame knocked off No. 2 Miami, 29–20, in South Bend and ensured the Hurricanes would not repeat as national champions. Perhaps an even greater upset came in Knoxville, where Alabama (with a 2–3 record), stunned No. 3 Tennessee, 9–6, just one week after the Volunteers had put up 45 points on Florida. The Vols lined up to kick a potential game winning FG with less than two minutes left only to see Stacy Harrison block the kick. The momentum from the block sent the ball forty yards back downfield and put Alabama in position to win on a last second field goal by All-American Phillip Doyle. No. 5 Auburn scored 10 points in the last 4 minutes to beat No. 7 Florida State 20–17 in a match-up of top ten teams. Auburn's win put them at No. 2 in the nation, their highest ranking since they won the national championship in 1957. No. 24 Michigan State continued their habit of close games against highly-ranked teams, losing 15-13 to No. 8 Illinois with all of the Illini's points coming on field goals. No. 11 Georgia Tech suffered their first imperfection of the season, but they did not lose the game thanks to a Scott Sisson field goal in the closing seconds. Their tiff with North Carolina ended in a 13–13 tie that would later haunt the Yellow Jackets. Michigan lost their second game in a row by a single point, this time to Iowa, 24–23, following their ascent to number one. The next poll featured No. 1 Virginia, No. 2 Auburn, No. 3 Notre Dame, No. 4 Nebraska, and No. 5 Illinois.

=== Week Nine: October 27, 1990 ===
No. 1 Virginia was idle. No. 2 Auburn won yet another nailbiter, prevailing 17-16 over Mississippi State on a blocked extra point. No. 3 Notre Dame won 31-22 at Pittsburgh, No. 4 Nebraska beat Iowa State 45-13, and No. 5 Illinois defeated Wisconsin 21-3. The next poll featured No. 1 Virginia, No. 2 Notre Dame, No. 3 Nebraska, No. 4 Auburn, and No. 5 Illinois.

=== Week Ten: November 3, 1990 ===
One of the most upset-filled days in college football history started at the top. No. 1 Virginia entered their game against No. 16 Georgia Tech short-handed, as star tight end Bruce McGonnigal ruptured his spleen in a freak accident when he fell into a concrete pit while looking for a lost dog. A late Cavaliers touchdown was nullified by a penalty called on one of McGonnigal's backups, and this play proved to be the difference when Georgia Tech's Scott Sisson kicked a field goal with time running out for a 41-38 victory. But this game shared top billing with the showdown in Lincoln, Nebraska, between No. 3 Nebraska and No. 9 Colorado. Trailing by 12 points with only 12 minutes to play, the Buffaloes scored four touchdowns, all from Eric Bieniemy, to win 27–12. And just when the shock had worn off, No. 15 Florida routed No. 4 Auburn, 48–7, and No. 5 Illinois fell 54-28 to No. 13 Iowa. A few highly-ranked teams actually won: No. 2 Notre Dame regained the top spot with a 52-31 win over Navy, No. 6 Houston beat TCU 56-35, No. 7 Washington defeated No. 23 Arizona 54-10, and No. 8 Miami shut out Pittsburgh 45-0. The next poll featured No. 1 Notre Dame, No. 2 Washington, No. 3 Houston, No. 4 Colorado, and No. 5 Miami.

=== Week Eleven: November 10, 1990 ===
In keeping with the strange season where the uncommon became commonplace, four of the top nine teams lost and the muddy national title picture got a little clearer. No. 2 Washington, poised for a possible shot at the title, lost a stunner at home to UCLA, 25–22, when the Bruins kicked the game-winning FG with seven seconds left, ending a national title dream, although the Huskies still were bound for the Rose Bowl. No. 3 Houston, with Heisman Trophy candidate David Klingler filling the shoes of departed 1989 Heisman winner Andre Ware, finally lost, falling 45–24 to No. 14 Texas and ending speculation that the national championship might go to a team on probation. Houston's bowl ineligibility assured they would be given no consideration in the final poll for a top ranking. No. 6 Iowa stumbled at home and lost to Ohio State, 27–26, as the Buckeyes scored the game-winning touchdown with one second left, ending the Hawkeyes' title bid. No. 9 Tennessee managed a fourth imperfection on their record—two losses and two ties—when they fell to No. 1 Notre Dame, 34–29.

The losses, however, helped clear the way for some other hopefuls. No. 4 Colorado beat Oklahoma State 41-22 to clinch the Big 8 title and an Orange Bowl berth, while No. 5 Miami was idle. No. 7 Georgia Tech scored their second buzzer-beating field goal in two weeks in a 6-3 win over Virginia Tech; the Yellow Jackets, whose only blemish was a tie against North Carolina in October, were now the only undefeated team in the nation. No. 8 Brigham Young won 45-14 over No. 25 Wyoming and moved up in the next poll: No. 1 Notre Dame, No. 2 Colorado, No. 3 Miami, No. 4 Georgia Tech, and No. 5 Brigham Young.

=== Week Twelve: November 17, 1990 ===
The championship picture, much clearer just a week earlier, was considerably muddied again when top-ranked Notre Dame became the fifth number one to fall from the top spot as No. 18 Penn State edged the No. 1 Irish, 24–21, on a Craig Fayak field goal with 4 seconds left, coming back from a 14-point deficit. No. 2 Colorado finished their season by overwhelming Kansas State 64-3, No. 3 Miami defeated Boston College 42-12, No. 4 Georgia Tech won 42-7 at Wake Forest, No. 5 Brigham Young visited Utah for a 45-22 victory, and No. 6 Florida was victorious 47-15 at Kentucky. The next poll featured No. 1 Colorado, No. 2 Miami, No. 3 Georgia Tech, No. 4 Brigham Young, and No. 5 Florida.

=== Week Thirteen: November 24, 1990 ===
No. 1 Colorado had finished their season. No. 2 Miami beat Syracuse 33-7, but undefeated No. 3 Georgia Tech (which was idle this week) moved ahead of the two-loss Hurricanes in the next poll. No. 4 Brigham Young defeated Utah State 45-10, and No. 5 Florida was idle. No. 6 Texas, who clinched the SWC title and a Cotton Bowl berth with a 22-13 win at Baylor, moved up in the next poll: No. 1 Colorado, No. 2 Georgia Tech, No. 3 Miami, No. 4 Brigham Young, and No. 5 Texas.

=== Week Thirteen: December 1, 1990 ===
No. 1 Colorado had finished their season. No. 2 Georgia Tech ended the year with a 40-23 win at Georgia. No. 3 Miami barely got past unheralded San Diego State 30-28, and No. 4 Brigham Young lost 59-28 at Hawaii. No. 5 Texas beat Texas A&M 28-27 on a failed two-point conversion by the Aggies. No. 7 Notre Dame, who had already finished their schedule, moved back into the top five in the final regular-season poll: No. 1 Colorado, No. 2 Georgia Tech, No. 3 Texas, No. 4 Miami, and No. 5 Notre Dame.

In a chaotic year where nearly every club had two or more losses, the top two teams were 10-1-1 Colorado and 10-0-1 Georgia Tech. The Buffaloes had an inferior record and were the beneficiaries of the referee's error in the Fifth Down Game, but they also played an extraordinarily tough schedule (their non-conference opponents included the champions of the Big Ten, Pac-10, and SWC as well as the second-place team in the SEC), while the Yellow Jackets faced easier opposition. As the champions of the Big 8 and ACC, the two teams were locked into the Orange and Citrus Bowls and were not able to play each other in a de facto national championship game.

Many of the bowl matchups were affected by unusual circumstances. For the second year in a row, the Orange Bowl organizers had invited top-ranked Notre Dame to play Big 8 champion Colorado in what they hoped would be a No. 1 vs. No. 2 matchup, only for the Fighting Irish to lose their next game after accepting the invitation; they had fallen to No. 5 by the time they faced No. 1 Colorado. The Sugar Bowl made an even bigger blunder by selecting Virginia as one of its participants, as the Cavaliers lost all of their remaining games after accepting the invitation and entered bowl season unranked. No. 11 Florida, the SEC champion, was barred from bowl participation due to NCAA sanctions, so No. 10 Tennessee (the only team to beat the Gators in conference play) took their place in the Sugar Bowl. The Big Ten finished in an unusual four-way tie for first place between No. 12 Michigan, No. 16 Illinois, No. 17 Iowa, and No. 22 Michigan State; the Hawkeyes, who beat all three of the other teams but lost to two lesser opponents, got the Rose Bowl bid against No. 8 Washington. The Cotton Bowl featured a relatively normal matchup between No. 3 Texas and No. 4 Miami, but the Fiesta Bowl, faced with a potential boycott over the state of Arizona's refusal to declare Martin Luther King Jr.’s birthday a holiday, had to settle for No. 18 Louisville against No. 25 Alabama. No. 2 Georgia Tech's Citrus Bowl opponent would be No. 19 Nebraska.

=== Bowl games ===
Although Miami had two losses, the Hurricanes would repeat as national champions if both Colorado and Georgia Tech lost while Miami won. The Hurricanes did their best, routing the Longhorns, 46–3, but the early morning 45–21 pounding of No. 19 Nebraska by Georgia Tech, closed the door on the Hurricanes chances and opened the question of whether Georgia Tech could possibly win a share if Colorado beat Notre Dame.

The wins by Miami and Georgia Tech ensured Notre Dame could not wind up as champion, but the Irish and Buffaloes fought to the finish with Colorado prevailing, 10–9, on a blocked extra point. With only 65 seconds left, it appeared Notre Dame had won when Rocket Ismail ran 91 yards with a punt return for touchdown that was called back on a clipping penalty. Deon Figures intercepted Rick Mirer's desperation pass to clinch the national title for Colorado.

=== UPI rankings shake-up ===
When the final votes were counted, Colorado had won their first national champion as voted by the Associated Press. The UPI coaches poll, however, saw a shake-up that resulted in Georgia Tech moving to No. 1 by one point. It has long been speculated that the deciding vote was cast by Colorado Buffaloes rival Nebraska's head coach Tom Osborne, the only coach who had played both teams during the 1990 season. Colorado beat Nebraska, 27–12, in Lincoln while Georgia Tech had beaten them in the Florida Citrus Bowl, 45–21.

== Statistical leaders ==
=== Rushing ===
The following players were the individual leaders in rushing during the 1990 NCA Division I-A season:

Rank	Player	Team	Games	Rushes	Yds	Avg	TD	Yds/ game
1	Darren Lewis	Texas A&M	12	291	1691	5.8	18	140.9
2	Gerald Hudson	Oklahoma State	11	279	1642	5.9	10	149.3
3	Eric Bieniemy	Colorado	11	288	1628	5.7	17	148.0
4	T. J. Duckett	Michigan State	11	249	1376	5.5	10	125.1
5	Roger Grant	Utah State	11	266	1370	5.2	8	124.5
6	Mike Mayweather	Army	11	274	1338	4.9	10	121.6
7	Trevor Cobb	Rice	11	283	1325	4.7	10	120.5
8	Greg Lewis	Washington	11	229	1279	5.6	8	116.3
9	Tony Thompson	Tennessee	12	219	1261	5.8	16	105.1
10	Sheldon Canley	San Jose State	11	296	1248	4.2	12	113.5
11	Stacey Robinson	Northern Illinois	11	193	1238	6.4	19	112.5
12	Jon Vaughn	Michigan	11	201	1236	6.1	9	112.4
13	Vaughn Dunbar	Indiana	11	229	1143	5.0	13	103.9
14	Hyland Hickson	Michigan State	11	220	1128	5.1	13	102.5
15	Michael Richardson	Louisiana Tech	10	222	1114	5.0	13	111.4
16	Chuck Weatherspoon	Houston	11	158	1097	6.9	7	99.7
17	Robert Smith	Ohio State	11	164	1064	6.5	7	96.7
18	Howard Griffith	Illinois	11	186	1056	5.7	15	96.0
19	Billy Smith	Central Michigan	11	244	1047	4.3	3	95.2
20	Mazio Royster	USC	12	203	1043	5.1	8	86.9

== Attendances ==
Average home attendance top 3:

Rank	Team	Average
1	Michigan Wolverines	104,508
2	Tennessee Volunteers	95,220
3	Ohio State Buckeyes	89,383

== See also ==
- Fifth Down Game (1990)
