= 1990 LSU Tigers football team =

American college football season

1990 LSU Tigers football
- Conference: Southeastern Conference
- Record: 5–6 (2–5 SEC)
- Head coach: Mike Archer (4th season)
- Offensive coordinator: Ed Zaunbrecher (6th season)
- Offensive scheme: Multiple
- Defensive coordinator: John Mitchell (1st season)
- Base defense: 3–4
- Home stadium: Tiger Stadium

1990 Southeastern Conference football standings
	Conf.					Overall
Team	W		L		T	W		L		T
No. 13 Florida ^{*}	6	–	1	–	0	9	–	2	–	0
No. 8 Tennessee $	5	–	1	–	1	9	–	2	–	2
No. 21 Ole Miss	5	–	2	–	0	9	–	3	–	0
Alabama	5	–	2	–	0	7	–	5	–	0
No. 19 Auburn	4	–	2	–	1	8	–	3	–	1
Kentucky	3	–	4	–	0	4	–	7	–	0
LSU	2	–	5	–	0	5	–	6	–	0
Georgia	2	–	5	–	0	4	–	7	–	0
Mississippi State	1	–	6	–	0	5	–	6	–	0
Vanderbilt	1	–	6	–	0	1	–	10	–	0
$ – Conference champion; ^{*} Florida ineligible for SEC championship due to NCAA probation.; Rankings from AP Poll

The 1990 LSU Tigers football team represented Louisiana State University (LSU) during the 1990 NCAA Division I-A football season. The team was led by Mike Archer in his fourth season and finished with an overall record of five wins and six losses (5–6 overall, 2–5 in the SEC).

Archer announced his resignation November 15, but coached the Tigers in their last two games.

== Schedule ==
Date	Time	Opponent	Site	TV	Result	Attendance	Source
September 8	7:00 p.m.	Georgia	Tiger Stadium; Baton Rouge, LA	PPV	W 18–13	76,751	
September 15	7:00 p.m.	Miami (OH)*	Tiger Stadium; Baton Rouge, LA	PPV	W 35–7	63,237	
September 22	11:30 a.m.	at Vanderbilt	Vanderbilt Stadium; Nashville, TN	TBS	L 21–24	33,149	
September 29	7:00 p.m.	No. 11 Texas A&M*	Tiger Stadium; Baton Rouge, LA (rivalry)	PPV	W 17–8	77,703	
October 6	6:30 p.m.	at No. 10 Florida	Ben Hill Griffin Stadium; Gainesville, FL (rivalry)	ESPN	L 8–34	75,039	
October 20	7:00 p.m.	Kentucky	Tiger Stadium; Baton Rouge, LA	PPV	W 30–20	64,720	
October 27	11:30 a.m.	at No. 12 Florida State*	Doak Campbell Stadium; Tallahassee, FL	TBS	L 3–42	60,111	
November 3	7:00 p.m.	No. 17 Ole Miss^{†}	Tiger Stadium; Baton Rouge, LA (rivalry)	PPV	L 10–19	79,634	
November 10	1:30 p.m.	at Alabama	Bryant–Denny Stadium; Tuscaloosa, AL (rivalry)	PPV	L 3–24	70,123	
November 17	1:30 p.m.	at Mississippi State	Mississippi Veterans Memorial Stadium; Jackson, MS (rivalry)	PPV	L 22–34	22,509	
November 24	7:00 p.m.	Tulane*	Tiger Stadium; Baton Rouge, LA (Battle for the Rag)	PPV	W 16–13	67,435	
*Non-conference game; ^{†}Homecoming; Rankings from AP Poll released prior to the game; All times are in Central time

== Personnel ==
1990 LSU Tigers football team roster
Players
Coaches
Offense

Pos.	#	Name	Class
RB		Leo Abel
RB		Odell Beckham
TE		Harold Bishop
WR		Marcus Carter
QB		Jesse Daigle	Fr
RB		Mike Garrett
QB		Sol Graves
WR		Wesley Jacob
WR		Todd Kinchen
OL		Darron Landry
QB		Chad Loup
OL		Andy Martin
OL		Kevin Mawae
OL		Blake Miller
QB		Chris Moock
RB		Derek Pope
WR		Scott Ray
RB		Sammy Seamster
WR		Tyke Tolbert
OL		Chris Truax
TE		Ricardo Washington
WR		Slip Watkins
RB		Darrell Williams
RB		Germaine Williams
RB		Harvey Williams
RB		Calvin Windom

Defense

Pos.	#	Name	Class
DB		Ray Adams
DL		Marc Boutte
NG	96	Bo Davis	So
DB		Vincent Fuller
DL		Leonard Harris
LB		Mike Hewitt
DB		Anthony Marshall
DB		Derriel McCorvey
DL		Clayton Mouton
DB		Corey Raymond
DB		Mike Stepteau
LB		Roovelroe Swan
LB		David Walkup
DL		Scott Wharton
LB		Anthony Williams
DB		Wayne Williams

Special teams

Pos.	#	Name	Class
P		Brian Griffith
K		Pedro Suarez

Head coach

- Mike Archer

Coordinators/assistant coaches

- Ed Zaunbrecher – Offensive coordinator/quarterbacks
- Jesse Daigle – Running backs
- Jerry Sullivan – Wide receivers
- Kenny Ferraro – Offensive line
- John Hendrick – Offensive line/tight ends
- John Mitchell – Defensive coordinator/outside linebackers
- Pete Jenkins – Defensive line
- John Fontes – Inside linebackers
- Joe Wessel – Special teams coordinator/defensive backs

Legend

- (C) Team captain
- (S) Suspended
- (I) Ineligible
- Injured
- Redshirt
