= 1990 Tennessee Volunteers football team =

American college football season

1990 Tennessee Volunteers football

SEC champion Sugar Bowl champion

Sugar Bowl, W 23–22 vs. Virginia
- Conference: Southeastern Conference

Ranking
- Coaches: No. 7
- AP: No. 8
- Record: 9–2–2 (5–1–1 SEC)
- Head coach: Johnny Majors (14th season)
- Offensive coordinator: Phillip Fulmer (2nd season)
- Defensive coordinator: Larry Lacewell (1st season)
- Captains: Tony Thompson; Roland Poles
- Home stadium: Neyland Stadium

1990 Southeastern Conference football standings
	Conf.					Overall
Team	W		L		T	W		L		T
No. 13 Florida ^{*}	6	–	1	–	0	9	–	2	–	0
No. 8 Tennessee $	5	–	1	–	1	9	–	2	–	2
No. 21 Ole Miss	5	–	2	–	0	9	–	3	–	0
Alabama	5	–	2	–	0	7	–	5	–	0
No. 19 Auburn	4	–	2	–	1	8	–	3	–	1
Kentucky	3	–	4	–	0	4	–	7	–	0
LSU	2	–	5	–	0	5	–	6	–	0
Georgia	2	–	5	–	0	4	–	7	–	0
Mississippi State	1	–	6	–	0	5	–	6	–	0
Vanderbilt	1	–	6	–	0	1	–	10	–	0
$ – Conference champion; ^{*} Florida ineligible for SEC championship due to NCAA probation.; Rankings from AP Poll

The 1990 Tennessee Volunteers football team represented the University of Tennessee in the 1990 NCAA Division I-A football season. Playing as a member of the Southeastern Conference (SEC), the team was led by head coach Johnny Majors, in his 14th year, and played their home games at Neyland Stadium in Knoxville, Tennessee. They finished the season with a record of nine wins, two losses, and two ties (9–2–2 overall, 5–1–1 in the SEC). Although the Volunteers finished second in standings, Florida was ruled ineligible on NCAA probation, and Tennessee was awarded the SEC Championship and the conference's Sugar Bowl bid, which they used to defeat Virginia. The Volunteers offense scored 465 points while the defense allowed 220 points.

== Schedule ==
Date	Time	Opponent	Rank	Site	TV	Result	Attendance	Source
August 26	3:00 p.m.	vs. No. 5 Colorado*	No. 8	Anaheim Stadium; Anaheim, CA (Pigskin Classic)	NBC	T 31–31	33,458	
September 1	4:00 p.m.	Pacific (CA)*	No. 8	Neyland Stadium; Knoxville, TN	PPV	W 55–7	94,467	
September 8	12:30 p.m.	at Mississippi State	No. 8	Scott Field; Starkville, MS	TBS	W 40–7	32,114	
September 15	1:00 p.m.	UTEP*	No. 7	Neyland Stadium; Knoxville, TN		W 56–0	95,203	
September 29	7:30 p.m.	at No. 3 Auburn	No. 5	Jordan-Hare Stadium; Auburn, AL	ESPN	T 26–26	85,214	
October 13	7:30 p.m.	No. 9 Florida^{†}	No. 5	Neyland Stadium; Knoxville, TN (rivalry)	ESPN	W 45–3	96,874	
October 20	4:00 p.m.	Alabama	No. 3	Neyland Stadium; Knoxville, TN (Third Saturday in October)	ESPN	L 6–9	96,732	
November 3	1:00 p.m.	Temple*	No. 11	Neyland Stadium; Knoxville, TN	PPV	W 41–20	93,898	
November 10	2:30 p.m.	No. 1 Notre Dame*	No. 9	Neyland Stadium; Knoxville, TN	CBS	L 29–34	97,123	
November 17	3:30 p.m.	vs. No. 15 Ole Miss	No. 14	Liberty Bowl Memorial Stadium; Memphis, TN (rivalry)	CBS	W 22–13	66,467	
November 24	1:30 p.m.	Kentucky	No. 14	Neyland Stadium; Knoxville, TN (rivalry)	TBS	W 42–28	92,243	
December 1	2:30 p.m.	at Vanderbilt	No. 12	Vanderbilt Stadium; Nashville, TN (rivalry)	PPV	W 49–20	41,492	
January 1	8:30 p.m.	vs. Virginia*	No. 10	Louisiana Superdome; New Orleans, LA (Sugar Bowl)	ABC	W 23–22	75,132	
*Non-conference game; ^{†}Homecoming; Rankings from AP Poll released prior to the game; All times are in Eastern time

== Game summaries ==
=== vs. Colorado ===
No. 5 Colorado vs. No. 8 Tennessee

Team	1	2	3	4	Total
Buffaloes	0	10	7	14	31
Volunteers	7	3	0	21	31

- Date: August 26
- Location: Anaheim Stadium, Anaheim, CA
- Game start: 12:05 p.m.
- Elapsed time: 3:43
- Game attendance: 33,458
- Game weather: 72 °F (22 °C), clear, Wind SW 8–10 mph (13–16 km/h)
- Referee: James Sprenger
- TV announcers (NBC): Don Criqui and Bill Walsh

Scoring summary
Q1	7:52	TENN	Chuck Webb 4-yard run (Burke kick)	TENN 7–0
Q2	9:55	COL	George Hemmingway 1-yard run (Harper kick)	Tied 7–7
Q2	8:09	COL	Jim Harper 35-yard field goal	COL 10–7
Q2	2:54	TENN	Greg Burke 47-yard field goal	Tied 10–10
Q3	10:49	COL	Mike Pritchard 55-yard run (Harper kick)	Tied 17–10
Q4	9:34	COL	Dave McCloughan 55-yard punt return (Harper kick)	COL 24–10
Q4	8:53	TENN	Alvin Harper 24-yard pass from Andy Kelly (Burke kick)	COL 24–17
Q4	7:11	COL	Mike Pritchard 78-yard run (Harper kick)	COL 31–17
Q4	5:36	TENN	Carl Pickens 14-yard pass from Andy Kelly (Burke kick)	COL 31–24
Q4	2:25	TENN	Chuck Webb 4-yard run (Burke kick)	Tied 31-31

== Personnel ==
1990 Tennessee Volunteers football team roster
Players
Coaches
Offense

Pos.	#	Name	Class
QB		Andy Kelly
WR		Carl Pickens

Defense

Pos.	#	Name	Class

Special teams

Pos.	#	Name	Class
K		Greg Burke
P		Joey Chapman

Head coach

- Johnny Majors

Coordinators/assistant coaches

- Phillip Fulmer – Offensive coordinator/offensive line
- David Cutcliffe – Quarterbacks
- Tommy West – Running backs
- Charlie Coe – Wide receivers
- Jack Sells – Tight ends
- Larry Lacewell – Defensive coordinator
- Rex Norris – Defensive line
- John Chavis – Linebackers
- Tim Keane – Defensive backs

Legend

- (C) Team captain
- (S) Suspended
- (I) Ineligible
- Injured
- Redshirt

== Team players drafted into the NFL ==
Player	Position	Round	Pick	NFL club
Charles McRae	Tackle	1	7	Tampa Bay Buccaneers
Antone Davis	Tackle	1	8	Philadelphia Eagles
Alvin Harper	Wide Receiver	1	12	Dallas Cowboys
Chuck Webb	Running Back	3	81	Green Bay Packers
Harlan Davis	Wide Receiver	5	128	Seattle Seahawks
Anthony Morgan	Wide Receiver	5	134	Chicago Bears
Greg Amsler	Running Back	8	198	Phoenix Cardinals
Roland Poles	Running Back	10	254	San Diego Chargers
Vince Moore	Wide Receiver	11	279	New England Patriots
