= 1990 Blockbuster Bowl =

American college football game

Penn State Nittany Lions	Florida State Seminoles
(9–2)	(9–2)
Independent	Independent
17	24
Head coach: Joe Paterno	Head coach: Bobby Bowden
AP / Coaches; 7 / 8	AP / Coaches; 6 / 5
	1	2	3	4	Total
Penn State	7	0	3	7	17
Florida State	10	7	7	0	24
- Date: December 28, 1990
- Season: 1990
- Stadium: Joe Robbie Stadium
- Location: Miami Gardens, Florida
- MVP: RB Amp Lee (Florida State)
- Referee: Dick Burleson (SEC)
- Attendance: 74,021

United States TV coverage
- Network: Raycom Sports
- Announcers: Tim Brant and Dave Rowe

The 1990 Blockbuster Bowl was an American college football bowl game between the Penn State Nittany Lions and the Florida State Seminoles.

== Background ==
The Nittany Lions lost their first two games of the season before going on a nine-game winning streak. Florida State won their first four games, lost two straight, and then won five straight.

== Game summary ==
On their first drive, the Seminoles scored on a Richie Andrews 41-yard field goal. Penn State could not respond, Florida State benefited off a 39-yard punt return that culminated with an Amp Lee touchdown. Tony Sacca threw a touchdown to David Daniels to put the Nittany Lions on the board with 1:13 remaining in the first quarter. Amp Lee ran for his second touchdown of the game early into the second quarter, giving the Seminoles a ten-point lead, which they retained up until the third quarter. In that quarter, Craig Fayak narrowed the lead on a 32-yard field goal. In response, Casey Weldon scored on a touchdown run to make the score 24–10. Penn State narrowed the lead to seven on a Terry Smith touchdown catch from Tom Bill. The Nittany Lions had one final chance to tie the game after getting into the Seminoles' red zone. With three minutes remaining, Seminole John Davis intercepted a pass near the end zone, as the Seminoles soon ran the clock out, winning the first annual Blockbuster Bowl. Amp Lee was named MVP of the game after rushing for 86 yards on 21 attempts for two touchdowns, while also catching 5 passes for 32 yards. Florida State dominated the possession of the game, having it for 33:47, opposed to Penn State's 26:13.

== Aftermath ==
The Seminoles would return to the bowl in 2008 and 2011. Penn State would return in 1993.

== Statistics ==
Statistics	FSU	Penn State
First downs	19	17
Yards rushing	152	122
Yards passing	248	278
Total yards	400	400
Punts-Average	7–37.6	6–36.3
Fumbles-Lost	0–0	2–0
Interceptions	2	3
Penalties-Yards	4–35	6–46
