= 1990 Alabama Crimson Tide football team =

American college football season

1990 Alabama Crimson Tide football

Fiesta Bowl, L 7–34 vs. Louisville
- Conference: Southeastern Conference
- Record: 7–5 (5–2 SEC)
- Head coach: Gene Stallings (1st season)
- Offensive coordinator: Mal Moore (9th season)
- Captains: Efrum Thomas; Gary Hollingsworth; Philip Doyle
- Home stadium: Bryant–Denny Stadium; Legion Field

1990 Southeastern Conference football standings
	Conf.					Overall
Team	W		L		T	W		L		T
No. 13 Florida ^{*}	6	–	1	–	0	9	–	2	–	0
No. 8 Tennessee $	5	–	1	–	1	9	–	2	–	2
No. 21 Ole Miss	5	–	2	–	0	9	–	3	–	0
Alabama	5	–	2	–	0	7	–	5	–	0
No. 19 Auburn	4	–	2	–	1	8	–	3	–	1
Kentucky	3	–	4	–	0	4	–	7	–	0
LSU	2	–	5	–	0	5	–	6	–	0
Georgia	2	–	5	–	0	4	–	7	–	0
Mississippi State	1	–	6	–	0	5	–	6	–	0
Vanderbilt	1	–	6	–	0	1	–	10	–	0
$ – Conference champion; ^{*} Florida ineligible for SEC championship due to NCAA probation.; Rankings from AP Poll

The 1990 Alabama Crimson Tide football team represented the University of Alabama for the 1990 NCAA Division I-A football season. The Crimson Tide was led by first-year head coach Gene Stallings, replacing Bill Curry who left for the University of Kentucky.

Early in the 1990 season, the Tide and new coach Gene Stallings lost three games by a combined total of eight points. In the opener against Southern Miss, star tailback Siran Stacy tore ligaments in his knee and missed the rest of the season. Florida Florida, Alabama lost another star player for the year in wide receiver Craig Sanderson and quarterback Gary Hollingsworth threw three interceptions to Florida safety Will White, and the Gators scored the winning touchdown on a blocked punt.

After wins over lightly regarded Vanderbilt and Southwestern Louisiana, Bama traveled to Knoxville to face undefeated, third-ranked Tennessee. The result was a shocking 9–6 upset victory, Alabama's fifth in a row in the Third Saturday in October rivalry. The game was a defensive struggle and a field goal duel. Tennessee's kicker Greg Burke, who hit a 51-yard field goal try to tie the game with ten minutes left, attempted a 50-yarder for the win with 1:35 to go, but Alabama's Stacy Harrison blocked the kick and the ball bounced to the Tennessee 37-yard line. The Crimson Tide advanced the ball seven yards on three running plays, setting up Philip Doyle's third field goal, a game-winning 48-yarder as time expired.

The next game was a 9–0 loss to Penn State in which Hollingsworth threw five interceptions and Bama rushed for only six yards. However, Alabama bounced back to win four in a row and salvage a winning season after the 0–3 start. Alabama won its first Iron Bowl in five years, dominating Auburn defensively and winning 16–7. It was the seventh game in a row in which the Alabama defense held the opposition to single digits. The season ended with a lopsided 34–7 bowl loss to Louisville, and Alabama finished 7–5.

== Schedule ==
Date	Time	Opponent	Rank	Site	TV	Result	Attendance	Source
September 8	1:30 p.m.	Southern Miss*	No. 13	Legion Field; Birmingham, AL	PPV	L 24–27	75,962	
September 15	11:30 a.m.	No. 24 Florida		Bryant–Denny Stadium; Tuscaloosa, AL (rivalry)	WTBS	L 13–17	70,123	
September 22	2:00 p.m.	at Georgia		Sanford Stadium; Athens, GA (rivalry)	CBS	L 16–17	82,122	
September 29	1:30 p.m.	Vanderbilt		Bryant–Denny Stadium; Tuscaloosa, AL	PPV	W 59–28	70,123	
October 6	4:00 p.m.	at Southwestern Louisiana*		Cajun Field; Lafayette, LA	PPV	W 25–6	36,133	
October 20	3:00 p.m.	at No. 3 Tennessee		Neyland Stadium; Knoxville, TN (Third Saturday in October)	ESPN	W 9–6	96,732	
October 27	4:00 p.m.	Penn State*^{†}		Bryant–Denny Stadium; Tuscaloosa, AL (rivalry)	ESPN	L 0–9	70,123	
November 3	11:30 a.m.	at Mississippi State		Scott Field; Starkville, MS (rivalry)	WTBS	W 22–0	39,252	
November 10	1:30 p.m.	LSU		Bryant–Denny Stadium; Tuscaloosa, AL (rivalry)	PPV	W 24–3	70,123	
November 17	1:30 p.m.	Cincinnati*		Legion Field; Birmingham, AL		W 45–7	71,327	
December 1	2:00 p.m.	No. 20 Auburn		Legion Field; Birmingham, AL (Iron Bowl)	CBS	W 16–7	75,962	
January 1, 1991	3:30 p.m.	vs. No. 18 Louisville*	No. 25	Sun Devil Stadium; Tempe, AZ (Fiesta Bowl)	NBC	L 7–34	69,098	
*Non-conference game; ^{†}Homecoming; Rankings from AP Poll released prior to the game; All times are in Central time

== Game summaries ==
=== Florida ===
#24 Florida Gators (1–0) at Alabama Crimson Tide (0–1)

Quarter	1	2	3	4	Total
Florida	0	0	10	7	17
Alabama	7	0	3	3	13

at Bryant–Denny Stadium, Tuscaloosa, Alabama

- Date: September 15, 1990
- Game attendance: 70,123
- TV: TBS

Game information
First quarter
- UA – Craig Sanderson 15-yard pass from Gary Hollingsworth (Philip Doyle kick), 3:55. Alabama 7–0.

Second quarter

- No scoring

Third quarter

- UA – Philip Doyle 41-yard field goal, 11:21. Alabama 10–0.
- UF – Terence Barber 6-yard pass from Shane Matthews (Arden Czyzewski kick), 7:48. Alabama 10–7.
- UF – Arden Czyzewski 23-yard field goal, 1:28. Tie 10–10.

Fourth quarter

- UF – Richard Fain recovered blocked punt in end zone (Arden Czyzewski kick), 14:45. Florida 17–10.
- UA – Philip Doyle 46-yard field goal, 7:22. Florida 17–13.

External videos
- Game highlights

== Personnel ==
1990 Alabama Crimson Tide football team roster
Players			Coaches
Offense: Pos. / # / Name / Class; QB / / Gary Hollingsworth	Defense: Pos. / # / Name / Class	Special teams: Pos. / # / Name / Class; K / / Philip Doyle	Head coach: Gene Stallings; Coordinators/assistant coaches: Ellis Johnson (outside linebackers); Legend: (C) Team captain; (S) Suspended; (I) Ineligible; Injured; Redshirt

== Statistics ==
Note: Does not include Fiesta Bowl.

=== Overall ===
Statistics	Alabama	Opponents
Touchdowns	26	13
Points Scored	253	127
Total First Downs	194	139
Rushing	111	62
Passing	72	65
Penalty	11	12
Total Yards	3,673	2,523
Rushing	2,144	1,007
Passing	1,529	1,519
Punts–Yards	64–2,473	79–3,105
FG Made–Att	24–29	12–17
XP Made–Att	25–25	11–11

=== Scoring ===
	1	2	3	4	Total
Alabama	89	74	42	48	253
Opponents	15	24	34	54	127

=== Passing ===
Name	Comp–Att	Pct.	TD	INT	Yards	Rating	Long
Hollingsworth	140–282	49.7	4	13	1,463	88.7	60
Woodson	2–11	18.2	0	3	66	14.0	35
Lee	0–1	0.0	0	0	0	0.0	0
