= 1990 Georgia Bulldogs football team =

American college football season

1990 Georgia Bulldogs football
- Conference: Southeastern Conference
- Record: 4–7 (2–5 SEC)
- Head coach: Ray Goff (2nd season)
- Offensive coordinator: George Haffner (11th season)
- Offensive scheme: Multiple
- Defensive coordinator: Richard Bell (2nd season)
- Base defense: 3–4
- Home stadium: Sanford Stadium

1990 Southeastern Conference football standings
	Conf.					Overall
Team	W		L		T	W		L		T
No. 13 Florida ^{*}	6	–	1	–	0	9	–	2	–	0
No. 8 Tennessee $	5	–	1	–	1	9	–	2	–	2
No. 21 Ole Miss	5	–	2	–	0	9	–	3	–	0
Alabama	5	–	2	–	0	7	–	5	–	0
No. 19 Auburn	4	–	2	–	1	8	–	3	–	1
Kentucky	3	–	4	–	0	4	–	7	–	0
LSU	2	–	5	–	0	5	–	6	–	0
Georgia	2	–	5	–	0	4	–	7	–	0
Mississippi State	1	–	6	–	0	5	–	6	–	0
Vanderbilt	1	–	6	–	0	1	–	10	–	0
$ – Conference champion; ^{*} Florida ineligible for SEC championship due to NCAA probation.; Rankings from AP Poll

The 1990 Georgia Bulldogs football team represented the University of Georgia as a member of the Southeastern Conference (SEC) during the 1990 NCAA Division I-A football season. Led by second-year head coach Ray Goff, the Bulldogs compiled an overall record of 4–7, with a mark of 2–5 in conference play, and finished tied for seventh in the SEC.

== Schedule ==
Date	Time	Opponent	Site	TV	Result	Attendance	Source
September 8	8:00 p.m.	at LSU	Tiger Stadium; Baton Rouge, LA	PPV	L 13–18	76,751	
September 15	1:00 p.m.	Southern Miss*	Sanford Stadium; Athens, GA		W 18–17	79,812	
September 22	3:00 p.m.	Alabama	Sanford Stadium; Athens, GA (rivalry)	CBS	W 17–16	82,122	
September 29	1:00 p.m.	East Carolina*	Sanford Stadium; Athens, GA		W 19–15	77,019	
October 6	1:00 p.m.	at No. 16 Clemson*	Memorial Stadium; Clemson, SC (rivalry)		L 3–34	83,127	
October 13	12:30 p.m.	No. 24 Ole Miss	Sanford Stadium; Athens, GA	TBS	L 12–28	78,321	
October 20	1:00 p.m.	Vanderbilt^{†}	Sanford Stadium; Athens, GA (rivalry)		W 39–28	81,640	
October 27	8:00 p.m.	at Kentucky	Commonwealth Stadium; Lexington, KY		L 24–26	55,255	
November 10	12:30 p.m.	vs. No. 10 Florida	Gator Bowl; Jacksonville, FL (rivalry)	TBS	L 7–38	81,529	
November 17	7:30 p.m.	at No. 24 Auburn	Jordan-Hare Stadium; Auburn, AL (rivalry)	ESPN	L 10–33	85,214	
December 1	12:30 p.m.	No. 2 Georgia Tech*	Sanford Stadium; Athens, GA (rivalry)	TBS	L 23–40	82,122	
*Non-conference game; ^{†}Homecoming; Rankings from AP Poll released prior to the game; All times are in Eastern time
