= Mike Mayweather =

Profile
- Position: Running back

Personal information
- Born: c. 1969

Career information
- College: Army (1987–1990)

Michael Mayweather (born c. 1969) is a former American football running back for the Army Black Knights from 1987 to 1990. He was the first Army player to compile multiple seasons with over 1,000 rushing yards, tallying 1,022 yards in 1988, 1,177 yards in 1989, and 1,338 yards in 1990. His 1,338-yard tally ranked sixth among all major-college players that year. He finished tenth in the 1990 Heisman Trophy voting, set an Army single-season rushing record, broke Glenn Davis's Army career records with 4,299 rushing yards and over 5,500 all-purpose yards, and was inducted into the Army Hall of Fame.

== See also ==
- Army Black Knights football statistical leaders#Rushing
- 1990 NCAA Division I-A football season#Rushing
