= 1990 Auburn Tigers football team =

American college football season

1990 Auburn Tigers football

Peach Bowl champion

Peach Bowl, W 27–23 vs. Indiana
- Conference: Southeastern Conference

Ranking
- Coaches: No. 19
- AP: No. 19
- Record: 8–3–1 (4–2–1 SEC)
- Head coach: Pat Dye (10th season)
- Defensive coordinator: Wayne Hall (5th season)
- Home stadium: Jordan–Hare Stadium

1990 Southeastern Conference football standings
	Conf.					Overall
Team	W		L		T	W		L		T
No. 13 Florida ^{*}	6	–	1	–	0	9	–	2	–	0
No. 8 Tennessee $	5	–	1	–	1	9	–	2	–	2
No. 21 Ole Miss	5	–	2	–	0	9	–	3	–	0
Alabama	5	–	2	–	0	7	–	5	–	0
No. 19 Auburn	4	–	2	–	1	8	–	3	–	1
Kentucky	3	–	4	–	0	4	–	7	–	0
LSU	2	–	5	–	0	5	–	6	–	0
Georgia	2	–	5	–	0	4	–	7	–	0
Mississippi State	1	–	6	–	0	5	–	6	–	0
Vanderbilt	1	–	6	–	0	1	–	10	–	0
$ – Conference champion; ^{*} Florida ineligible for SEC championship due to NCAA probation.; Rankings from AP Poll

The 1990 Auburn Tigers football team represented Auburn University in the 1990 NCAA Division I-A football season. Coached by Pat Dye, the team finished the season with an 8–3–1 record and ended their streak of three Southeastern Conference titles. The Tigers defeated Indiana, 27–23, in the Peach Bowl.

== Schedule ==
Date	Time	Opponent	Rank	Site	TV	Result	Attendance	Source
September 8	11:30 a.m.	Cal State Fullerton*	No. 3	Jordan-Hare Stadium; Auburn, AL		W 38–17	77,500	
September 15	12:00 p.m.	at Ole Miss	No. 2	Mississippi Veterans Memorial Stadium; Jackson, MS (rivalry)		W 24–10	41,500	
September 29	6:30 p.m.	No. 5 Tennessee	No. 3	Jordan-Hare Stadium; Auburn, AL (rivalry)	ESPN	T 26–26	85,214	
October 6	11:00 a.m.	Louisiana Tech*^{†}	No. 5	Jordan-Hare Stadium; Auburn, AL		W 16–14	72,350	
October 13	12:30 p.m.	Vanderbilt	No. 6	Jordan-Hare Stadium; Auburn, AL		W 56–6	79,269	
October 20	6:30 p.m.	No. 7 Florida State*	No. 5	Jordan-Hare Stadium; Auburn, AL	ESPN	W 20–17	85,214	
October 27	1:30 p.m.	at Mississippi State	No. 2	Scott Field; Starkville, MS		W 17–16	39,106	
November 3	6:30 p.m.	at No. 15 Florida	No. 4	Ben Hill Griffin Stadium; Gainesville, FL (rivalry)	ESPN	L 7–48	75,459	
November 10	11:00 a.m.	Southern Miss*	No. 15	Jordan-Hare Stadium; Auburn, AL		L 12–13	85,214	
November 17	6:30 p.m.	Georgia	No. 24	Jordan-Hare Stadium; Auburn, AL (rivalry)	ESPN	W 33–10	85,214	
December 1	2:00 p.m.	at Alabama	No. 20	Legion Field; Birmingham, AL (Iron Bowl)	CBS	L 7–16	75,962	
December 29	11:30 a.m.	vs. Indiana*		Atlanta–Fulton County Stadium; Atlanta, GA (Peach Bowl)	ABC	W 27–23	38,962	
*Non-conference game; ^{†}Homecoming; Rankings from AP Poll released prior to the game; All times are in Central time

== Roster ==
1990 Auburn Tigers football team roster
Players
Coaches
Offense

Pos.	#	Name	Class
TB	10	James Joseph	Sr
QB	11	Stan White	Fr
OL	70	Bob Meeks	Jr

Defense

Pos.	#	Name	Class

Special teams

Pos.	#	Name	Class
K	3	Jim Von Wyl	Jr

Head coach

- Pat Dye

Coordinators/assistant coaches

- Kurt Crain (GA)

Legend

- (C) Team captain
- (S) Suspended
- (I) Ineligible
- Injured
- Redshirt
