= 1990 Florida Gators football team =

American college football season

1990 Florida Gators football
- Conference: Southeastern Conference

Ranking
- AP: No. 13
- Record: 9–2 (6–1 SEC)
- Head coach: Steve Spurrier (1st season)
- Offensive scheme: Fun and gun
- Defensive coordinator: Jim Bates (1st season)
- Base defense: 4–3
- Captains: Chris Bromley; Ernie Mills; Godfrey Myles; Glenn Neely; Huey Richardson
- Home stadium: Ben Hill Griffin Stadium

1990 Southeastern Conference football standings
	Conf.					Overall
Team	W		L		T	W		L		T
No. 13 Florida ^{*}	6	–	1	–	0	9	–	2	–	0
No. 8 Tennessee $	5	–	1	–	1	9	–	2	–	2
No. 21 Ole Miss	5	–	2	–	0	9	–	3	–	0
Alabama	5	–	2	–	0	7	–	5	–	0
No. 19 Auburn	4	–	2	–	1	8	–	3	–	1
Kentucky	3	–	4	–	0	4	–	7	–	0
LSU	2	–	5	–	0	5	–	6	–	0
Georgia	2	–	5	–	0	4	–	7	–	0
Mississippi State	1	–	6	–	0	5	–	6	–	0
Vanderbilt	1	–	6	–	0	1	–	10	–	0
$ – Conference champion; ^{*} Florida ineligible for SEC championship due to NCAA probation.; Rankings from AP Poll

The 1990 Florida Gators football team represented the University of Florida during the 1990 NCAA Division I-A football season. The season marked the return of the Gators' Heisman Trophy-winning quarterback Steve Spurrier to his alma mater as the new head coach of the Florida Gators football team.

Spurrier's 1990 Florida Gators, while ineligible to win the SEC title or receive a bowl bid because of lingering NCAA probation, nevertheless posted a best-in-the-SEC record of 6–1 and an overall record of 9–2, and laid the foundation for the Gators' run of six SEC championships and a national title during the next decade. They finished thirteenth in the season's final AP Poll.

== Before the season ==
Just before Spurrier's Gator coaching debut, the Gainesville campus was rocked by the murders committed by Danny Rolling.

During Spurrier's first season, he was able to build on the strong talent recruited by departing Gators coach Galen Hall, but the Gators also reaped the benefits of Spurrier's "there are no excuses for losing" mantra. Even as Spurrier's new "fun 'n' gun" offensive scheme led by quarterback Shane Matthews, wide receiver Ernie Mills and tight end Kirk Kirkpatrick was breaking team scoring and yardage records, defensive coordinator Jim Bates coached one of the best defensive squads in team history, including two first-team All-Americans, defensive end Huey Richardson and safety Will White.

== Schedule ==
Date	Opponent	Rank	Site	TV	Result	Attendance	Source
September 8	Oklahoma State*		Ben Hill Griffin Stadium; Gainesville, FL		W 50–7	75,428	
September 15	at Alabama	No. 24	Bryant–Denny Stadium; Tuscaloosa, AL (rivalry)	TBS	W 17–13	70,123	
September 22	No. 1 (I-AA) Furman*	No. 19	Ben Hill Griffin Stadium; Gainesville, FL		W 27–3	71,868	
September 29	Mississippi State	No. 17	Ben Hill Griffin Stadium; Gainesville, FL	TBS	W 34–21	72,943	
October 6	LSU	No. 10	Ben Hill Griffin Stadium; Gainesville, FL (rivalry)	ESPN	W 34–8	75,039	
October 13	at No. 5 Tennessee	No. 9	Neyland Stadium; Knoxville, TN (rivalry)	ESPN	L 3–45	96,874	
October 20	Akron*^{†}	No. 17	Ben Hill Griffin Stadium; Gainesville, FL		W 59–0	74,558	
November 3	No. 4 Auburn	No. 15	Ben Hill Griffin Stadium; Gainesville, FL (rivalry)	ESPN	W 48–7	75,459	
November 10	vs. Georgia	No. 10	Gator Bowl; Jacksonville, FL (rivalry)	TBS	W 38–7	81,529	
November 17	at Kentucky	No. 6	Commonwealth Stadium; Lexington, KY (rivalry)	TBS	W 47–15	55,140	
December 1	at No. 8 Florida State*	No. 6	Doak Campbell Stadium; Tallahassee, FL (rivalry)	ESPN	L 30–45	63,190	
*Non-conference game; ^{†}Homecoming; Rankings from AP Poll released prior to the game

== Personnel ==
1990 Florida Gators football team roster
Players
Coaches
Offense

Pos.	#	Name	Class
RB		Brady Ackerman
WR		Terence Barber
OL		Chris Bromley
QB		Michel Cohen
OL		Cal Dixon
WR		Monty Duncan
WR		Tre Everett
OL		Brian Fisher
WR		Aubrey Hill
WR		Harrison Houston
OL		Hesham Ismail	Jr
RB		Terrell Jackson
TE		Greg Keller
TE		Kirk Kirkpatrick
RB		Kedra Malone
QB	9	Shane Matthews	So
RB		Willie McClendon
RB		Dexter McNabb
WR		Ernie Mills
QB		Kyle Morris
RB		Kelvin Randolph
RB		Errict Rhett
OL		Tony Rowell
WR		Alonzo Sullivan
RB		Chuck Wabbersen
OL		Jim Watson
OL		Mark White

Defense

Pos.	#	Name	Class
LB		Ephesians Bartley
DL		Mike Brandon
DL		Brad Culpepper
DB	28	Richard Fain
DL		William Gaines
DB		Monty Grow
DL		Darren Mickell
LB		Carlton Miles
DL		Mark Murray
LB		Jerry Odom
LB		Tim Paulk
DL		Huey Richardson
LB		Ed Robinson
DB		Del Speer	So
DB		Jimmy Spencer
DB	2	Will White	So

Special teams

Pos.	#	Name	Class
K		Arden Czyzewski
P		Jason Hailey
K		Ryan Ruland

Head coach

- Steve Spurrier

Coordinators/assistant coaches

- Jim Bates

Legend

- (C) Team captain
- (S) Suspended
- (I) Ineligible
- Injured
- Redshirt

== Game summaries ==
=== Oklahoma State ===
Oklahoma State Cowboys at Florida Gators

Quarter	1	2	3	4	Total
Cowboys	0	7	0	0	7
Gators	14	12	14	10	50

at Ben Hill Griffith Stadium, Gainesville, Florida

- Date: September 8
- Game attendance: 75,428
- Recap/Box Score

Game information

First quarter

- UF – Dexter McNabb 2-yard run (Arden Czyzewski kick), 13:18. Florida 7–0.
- UF – Shane Matthews 1-yard run (Arden Czyzewski kick), 3:20. Florida 14–0.

Second quarter

- OSU – Curtis Mayfield 14-yard pass from Chris Smith (Cary Blanchard kick), 13:35. Florida 14–7.
- UF – Arden Czyzewski 33-yard field goal, 10:59. Florida 17–7.
- UF – Safety, Chris Smith tackled by Huey Richardson in end zone, 5:20. Florida 19–7.
- UF – Willie McClendon 1-yard run (Arden Czyzewski kick), 3:24. Florida 26–7.

Third quarter

- UF – Tre Everett 50-yard pass from Shane Matthews (Arden Czyzewski kick), 7:45. Florida 33–7.
- UF – Willie McClendon 3-yard run (Arden Czyzewski kick), 3:14. Florida 40–7.

Fourth quarter

- UF – Arden Czyzewski 40-yard field goal, 11:34. Florida 43–7.
- UF – Darren Mickell 14-yard interception return (Arden Czyzewski kick), 9:21. Florida 50–7.

Top passers

- OSU – Chris Smith – 11/22, 81 yards, TD
- UF – Shane Matthews – 20/29, 332 yards, TD

Top rushers

- OSU – Gerald Hudson – 14 rushes, 86 yards
- UF – Errict Rhett – 7 rushes, 63 yards

Top receivers

- OSU – Curtis Mayfield – 7 receptions, 110 yards, TD
- UF – Tre Everett – 5 receptions, 123 yards, TD

Combating the gloom, the Gators opened the season with a no-huddle, 80-yard touchdown drive in six plays to defeat the Oklahoma State Cowboys 50–7.

External videos
- Full game (first half)
- Full game (second half)

=== At Alabama ===
No. 24 Florida Gators at Alabama Crimson Tide

Quarter	1	2	3	4	Total
No. 24 Gators	0	0	10	7	17
Crimson Tide	7	0	3	3	13

at Bryant–Denny Stadium, Tuscaloosa, Alabama

- Date: September 15
- Game attendance: 70,123
- TV: TBS
- Recap/Box

Game information
First quarter
- UA – Craig Sanderson 15-yard pass from Gary Hollingsworth (Philip Doyle kick), 3:55. Alabama 7–0.

Second quarter

- No scoring

Third quarter

- UA – Philip Doyle 41-yard field goal, 11:21. Alabama 10–0.
- UF – Terence Barber 6-yard pass from Shane Matthews (Arden Czyzewski kick), 7:48. Alabama 10–7.
- UF – Arden Czyzewski 23-yard field goal, 1:28. Tie 10–10.

Fourth quarter

- UF – Richard Fain recovered blocked punt in end zone (Arden Czyzewski kick), 14:45. Florida 17–10.
- UA – Philip Doyle 46-yard field goal, 7:22. Florida 17–13.

In their second game, the Gators came from behind to beat Alabama, a confidence-building, 17–13 signature road win, which set the tone for the remainder of the season,. Spurrier treasured the wins against the Crimson Tide: "Those victories early – '90, '91 – really got us started there at Florida ..." Alabama quarterback Gary Hollingsworth threw three interceptions to Florida safety Will White, and the Gators scored the winning touchdown on a blocked punt.

External videos
- Game highlights

=== Furman ===
Florida then beat Furman 27–3.

=== Mississippi State ===
Building on the Alabama win, the Gators had a 34–21 conference victory over the Mississippi State Bulldogs.

=== LSU ===
Next, the Gators blew out the LSU Tigers 34–8.

=== At No. 5 Tennessee ===
The Gators suffered a disappointing 45-3 road loss to the fifth-ranked Tennessee Volunteers in Knoxville, Tennessee. In yet another link between the programs, Spurrier had been a star quarterback at Science Hill High School in Johnson City, Tennessee during the early 1960s. Although Knoxville is nearby, he did not seriously consider attending UT because he was an excellent passer and the Vols ran a single-wing offense at the time which featured a running quarterback. Instead, he choose to return to the state of his birth (Spurrier was born in Miami Beach), eventually becoming the Gators' first Heisman Trophy winner in 1966.

Spurrier's first Gator squad was 5–0 and ranked No. 9 coming into the matchup with Johnny Majors' 3–0–2 and No. 5 Vols, marking the first time in series history that both rivals were ranked in the AP top-10 when they faced off. (It was not Spurrier's first visit to Knoxville as an opposing coach; his 1988 Duke Blue Devils had upset the Vols 31–26.)

The 1990 game began as a defensive struggle, with UT holding a slim 7–3 lead at the half. However, the Vols' Dale Carter returned the second half kickoff 91 yards for a touchdown, igniting the home crowd at Neyland Stadium.

On their ensuing possession, the Gators fumbled for what would be the first of six UF turnovers in the second half. The opportunistic Vols took full advantage, turning Spurrier's homecoming (and, coincidentally, UT's homecoming game) into a dominating 45–3 rout, the largest margin of victory for either team in the series.

=== Akron ===
Florida blanked Akron 59–0.

=== Auburn ===
Team	1	2	3	4	Total
No. 4 Tigers	7	0	0	0	7
• No. 15 Gators	7	27	7	7	48

- Date: November 3
- Location: Ben Hill Griffith Stadium
- Game attendance: 75,459
- TV announcers (ESPN): Ron Franklin and Gary Danielson (play-by-play), Kevin Kiley (sideline reporter)

Scoring summary
Q1	FLA	McNabb 1 yard run (Czyzewski kick)	FLA 7–0
Q1	AUB	Casey 55 yard pass from White (Von Wyl kick)	Tie 7–7
Q2	FLA	McClendon 1 yard run (Czyzewski kick)	FLA 14–7
Q2	FLA	Czyzewski 42 yard field goal	FLA 17–7
Q2	FLA	McClendon 3 yard run (Czyzewski kick)	FLA 24–7
Q2	FLA	Rhett 29 yard run (Czyzewski kick)	FLA 31–7
Q2	FLA	Czyzewski 42 yard field goal	FLA 34–7
Q3	FLA	McClendon 1 yard run (Czyzewski kick)	FLA 41–7
Q4	FLA	Rhett 4 yard run (Czyzewski kick)	FLA 48–7

Coach Pat Dye's 1990 Auburn Tigers were the defending three-time SEC champions, had built an undefeated 6−0−1 record, and were ranked fourth in the nation in the AP Poll. Notwithstanding the fact that first-year coach Steve Spurrier's fifteenth-ranked Gators were three-point favorites, Dye had been publicly dismissive of Spurrier's pass-oriented offense before the game. The Gators and Tigers were tied 7–7 after the first quarter, but Spurrier's Gators exploded for twenty-seven points in the second quarter, resulting in a 34–7 halftime lead and a 48–7 victory for the Gators, which was the Gators' biggest margin of victory in the series, and the worst loss of Dye's career.

=== Vs. Georgia ===
World's Largest Outdoor Cocktail Party: Florida Gators vs. Georgia Bulldogs

Quarter	1	2	3	4	Total
Bulldogs	7	0	0	0	7
No. 10 Gators	14	10	14	0	38

at Gator Bowl, Jacksonville, Florida

- Date: November 10
- Game attendance: 81,529
- Gainesville Sun

Game information

Georgia

- Greg Talley
  6/12, 93 Yds, TD, 2 INT
- Dupree
  8 Rush, 32 Yds
- Hummings
  3 Rec, 33 Yds

Florida

- Shane Matthews
  26/39, 344 Yds, 3 TD
- Willie McClendon
  16 Rush, 58 Yds, TD
- Kirk Kirkpatrick
  8 Rec, 112 Yds

Florida's first win against Georgia since 1986, the Gators beat the Bulldogs 38–7 .

Scoring summary

Quarter	Time	Drive			Team	Scoring information	Score	
Quarter	Time	Plays	Yards	TOP	Team	Scoring information	UGA	FLA
1					Florida	Willie McClendon 2-yard touchdown run, Arden Czyzewski kick good	0	7
1					Florida	Interception returned 36 yards for touchdown by Tim Paulk, Arden Czyzewski kick good	0	14
1					Georgia	Andre Hastings 23-yard touchdown reception from Greg Talley, John Kasay kick good	7	14
2					Florida	23-yard field goal by Arden Czyzewski	7	17
2					Florida	Ernie Mills 6-yard touchdown reception from Shane Matthews, Arden Czyzewski kick good	7	24
3					Florida	Terence Barber 51-yard touchdown reception from Shane Matthews, Arden Czyzewski kick good	7	31
3					Florida	Ernie Mills 16-yard touchdown reception from Shane Matthews, Arden Czyzewski kick good	7	38
"TOP" = time of possession. For other American football terms, see Glossary of American football.							7	38

=== At Kentucky ===
Florida beat the Kentucky Wildcats 47–15.

=== At No. 8 Florida State ===
No. 6 Florida Gators at No. 8 Florida State Seminoles

Quarter	1	2	3	4	Total
No. 6 Gators	3	7	6	14	30
No. 8 Seminoles	17	7	14	7	45

at Doak Campbell Stadium, Tallahassee, Florida

- Date: December 1, 1990
- Game weather: Clear
- Game attendance: 63,190
- Recap/Box Score

Game information

First quarter

- FSU – Lawrence Dawsey 76-yard pass from Casey Weldon (Richie Andrews kick), 14:03. Florida St 7–0. Drive:
- FSU – Richie Andrews 47-yard field goal, 12:57. Florida St 10–0. Drive:
- FLA – Arden Czyzewski 41-yard field goal, 8:35. Florida St 10–3. Drive:
- FSU - Amp Lee 8-yard pass from Casey Weldon (Richie Andrews kick), 2:36. Florida St 17–3. Drive:

Second quarter

- FLA – Shane Matthews 1-yard run (Arden Czyzewski kick), 5:12. Florida St 17–10. Drive:
- FSU – Edgar Bennett 2-yard run (Richie Andrews kick), 1:11. Florida St 24–10. Drive:

Third quarter

- FSU – Edgar Bennett 2-yard run (Richie Andrews kick), 10:59. Florida St 31–10. Drive:
- FLA – Ernie Mills 14-yard pass from Shane Matthews (kick blocked), 4:03. Florida St 31–16. Drive:
- FSU – Amp Lee 16-yard run (Richie Andrews kick), 3:08. Florida St 38–16. Drive:

Fourth quarter

- FLA – Shane Matthews 1-yard run (pass good), 12:38. Florida St 38–24. Drive:
- FSU – Amp Lee 2-yard run (Richie Andrews kick), 11:56. Florida St 45–24. Drive:
- FLA – Kirk Kirkpatrick 9-yard pass from Shane Matthews (pass failed), 8:50. Florida St 45–30. Drive:

Top passers

- FLA – Shane Matthews – 29/48, 351 yards, 2 TD, 2 INT
- FSU – Casey Weldon – 13/23, 325 yards, 2 TD

Top rushers

- FLA – Errict Rhett – 14 rushes, 57 yards
- FSU – Amp Lee – 26 rushes, 147 yards, 2 TD

Top receivers

- FLA – Ernie Mills – 7 receptions, 126 yards, TD
- FSU – Lawrence Dawsey – 4 receptions, 172 yards, TD

The game was dubbed by some as the "Seminole Bowl" due to Florida's postseason ban.

== Postseason ==
Matthews finished the season with 2,952 passing yards and twenty-three touchdowns—then the most passing yards in Gators history. He was SEC Player of the Year.

Before Spurrier returned to Gainesville, the Gators had never won an officially sanctioned Southeastern Conference (SEC) or national football championship (Florida's first SEC championship was in 1984, but was retroactively vacated by the SEC for infractions incurred by former head coach Charley Pell). Before Spurrier resigned to seek a coaching position in the National Football League in January 2002, the Gators would win six SEC titles, play for two national championships, and win one in 1996.
