= College Football on TNT Sports =

American live sports television series

- Also known as: TBS Sports NCAA Football; TBS Sports SEC Football; Big PlayStation Saturday; TBS Saturday Night College Football; TNT Sports College Football
- Genre: American college football game telecasts
- Presented by: Various commentators
- Theme music composer: Mark Willott
- Country of origin: United States
- Original language: English
- No. of seasons: 28 (through 2026 season)

Production
- Production locations: Various NCAA stadiums (game telecasts)
- Camera setup: Multi-camera
- Running time: 210 minutes or until game ends (inc. adverts)
- Production companies: National Collegiate Athletic Association; TNT Sports (1982–2001 and 2024–present); ESPN (2024–present) (Note: College Football Playoff First Round games only)

Original release
- Network: TBS
- Release: September 2, 1982 – November 4, 2006
- Network: TNT/TruTV
- Release: August 29, 2024 – present

TNT Sports (formerly Turner Sports) has occasionally televised college football games on its networks since 1982; that year, under an agreement with the NCAA, TBS became the first broadcaster to nationally televise college football on cable. After the NCAA broadcasting package was dismantled in 1984 following a Supreme Court ruling, TBS would broadcast SEC football from 1984 to 1992, along with selected bowl games through 2000.

Regular-season college football returned to TBS in 2002 as part of a sub-licensing agreement with Fox Sports Net, broadcasting a package of Pac-10 and Big 12 games through 2006.

In 2024, ESPN announced that it had reached an agreement with TNT Sports to televise College Football Playoff games on TNT beginning that season; the games are produced by ESPN as part of its college football coverage. This was followed by its acquisition of a Mountain West Conference package on TruTV for the 2024 season, and a Big 12 package that premiered in 2025 as part of a sub-licensing agreement with ESPN.

== History ==
=== Early coverage ===
In 1982, SuperStation WTBS reached a special "supplemental" television contract with the NCAA—who controlled all college football television rights at the time—to carry a package of live games on cable. TBS became the first cable network to nationally televise college football games. They aired a package of live Division I-AA games on Thursday nights and Division I-A games on Saturdays.

WTBS was only able to show teams that had not been on national television in 1981. There were a maximum of four teams that had been on regional television on two occasions. Meanwhile, ABC and CBS had the right to take away a game from WTBS as long as it did so no later than the Monday before the game. Bob Neal and Tim Foley were the booth commentators for WTBS during this period. Meanwhile, Craig Sager, Paul Hornung and Pepper Rodgers anchored the pregame show for WTBS.

In 1984, the Supreme Court ruled in NCAA v. Board of Regents of the University of Oklahoma that the NCAA's television rights model for college football violated the Sherman Antitrust Act, thus allowing individual schools to sell the television rights to their home games. In June 1984, WTBS sports director Terry Hanson stated that they planned to compete for the national television rights being offered by the College Football Association (CFA)—a consortium of major conferences—and would challenge any attempt to impose regional blackouts. He told the press, "Every organization takes the personality of its leader. So we are obnoxiously aggressive." WTBS would acquire a package of games from the Southeastern Conference (SEC).

TBS dropped regular season college football after the 1992 season, but acquired rights to the Gator Bowl from 1991 to 1995 (after which the game moved to NBC), and the Carquest Bowl under an agreement with its owner Raycom Sports (a deal that would be later renewed through 2000).

=== 2002–2006: Big 12 and Pac-10 sub-license ===
In 2002, Turner Sports reached a five-year sub-licensing agreement with Fox Sports Net (FSN), under which it would broadcast a package of games from the Big 12 and Pac-10 conferences. By then, TBS's pre-game show was branded as Big PlayStation Saturday as part of a sponsorship with Sony Computer Entertainment. The agreement ended after the 2006 season, after which the package moved to Versus for 2007.

=== 2024–2028: College Football Playoff, Mountain West and Big 12 ===
On May 22, 2024, ESPN announced that it had sub-licensed a portion of the College Football Playoff broadcast rights to TNT Sports from the 2024 season—the first to feature a new 12-team tournament format—through 2028. Under the agreement, TNT Sports broadcasts two CFP first round games annually beginning in the 2024 season and will broadcast two of the New Year's Six bowls hosting the CFP quarterfinals beginning in the 2026 season. On June 6, 2025, it was reported that the agreement had been extended to also include one of the CFP semifinal games beginning in the 2026 season.

The CFP telecasts are produced by ESPN as part of its college football coverage and use its on-air talent. The games are simulcast on TNT, TBS, TruTV and HBO Max. John Ourand reported that ESPN would also keep all advertising revenue from the telecasts for at least the first two years of the agreement; he suspected that the agreement was intended as leverage in carriage negotiations for TNT amid the end of its long-running broadcast agreement with the NBA and to bolster Venu Sports—a then-upcoming sports streaming service that was to include ESPN and TNT Sports as partners.

On July 1, 2024, TNT Sports also announced an agreement with the Mountain West Conference, under which it would carry a package of 14 games on TruTV and streaming on Max. Ahead of the season, TNT Sports hired former players Champ Bailey, Takeo Spikes and Victor Cruz to serve as studio panelists, joined by NBA on TNT Tuesday host Adam Lefkoe. Despite being announced as a multi-year deal, the agreement did not continue after the 2024 season.

On November 16, 2024, as part of a settlement tied to a legal dispute with the NBA over its next round of media rights, it was reported that ESPN had agreed to sublicense a package of Big 12 football and basketball games to TNT Sports beginning in the 2025 season. TNT Sports' vice president of technology and operations Chris Brown explained that the 2024 season had "helped bring us up to speed on how networks are covering college football" and that lessons from the Mountain West coverage had been used to help retool and enhance its production for the 2025 season.

== Commentators ==
=== Current ===
==== Play-by-play ====
- J.B. Long, play-by-play commentator (2024–present)
- Joe Tessitore, College Football Playoff play-by-play (Note: via ESPN sublicense)
- Bob Wischusen, College Football Playoff play-by-play

==== Color commentators ====
- Mike Golic, Jr., lead color commentator (2024–present)
- Jesse Palmer, College Football Playoff color commentator
- Louis Riddick, College Football Playoff color commentator

==== Sideline reporters ====
- Allie LaForce, lead reporter (2025–present)
- Coy Wire, co-lead reporter (2025–present)
- Jared Greenberg, fill–in reporter (2024–present)
- Lauren Jbara, fill–in reporter (2024–present)
- Katie George, College Football Playoff reporter
- Quint Kessenich, College Football Playoff reporter
- Kris Budden, College Football Playoff reporter
- Stormy Buonantony, College Football Playoff reporter

==== Rules analysts ====
- Matt Austin, College Football Playoff rules analyst

==== Studio hosts ====
- Adam Lefkoe, lead studio host (2024–present)
- Coy Wire, fill-in studio host (2025–present)
- Liam McHugh, fill-in studio host (2025–present)
- Jordan Cornette, fill-in studio host (2026-present)
- Kevin Negandhi, College Football Playoff studio host

==== Studio analysts ====
- Champ Bailey, lead studio analyst (2024–present)
- Takeo Spikes, lead studio analyst (2024–present)
- Victor Cruz, lead studio analyst (2024–present)
- Booger McFarland, College Football Playoff studio analyst

=== Former ===
==== Play-by-play ====
- Bob Neal (1982–1991, 1996–1997 and 2004–2005)
- Lindsey Nelson (1985)
- Pete van Wieren (1985–1986)
- Mel Proctor (1986)
- Skip Caray (1986)
- Gary Bender (1992–1994)
- Verne Lundquist (1995)
- Kevin Harlan (1998–2000)
- Ron Thulin (2002–2006)
- Chip Caray (2006)
- Ari Wolfe (2024)
- Mark Jones, College Football Playoff play-by-play (2024)
- Dave Pasch, College Football Playoff play-by-play (2024)

==== Color commentators ====
- Tim Foley (1982–1991)
- Paul Hornung (1985–1986)
- Ron Kramer (1985–1986)
- Archie Griffin (1986)
- Pat Haden (1992–1995)
- Mark May (1996–1998)
- Trev Alberts (1999)
- Sam Wyche (1999)
- Dave Rowe (2000)
- Charles Davis (2002–2006)
- Tom Ramsey (2004–2006)
- Darius Walker (2024)
- Roddy Jones, College Football Playoff color commentator (2024)
- Dusty Dvoracek, College Football Playoff color commentator (2024)

==== Sideline reporters ====
- Craig Sager (1989–1994, 1996–2000 and 2002–2006)
- Kevin Kiley (1995)
- Erin Andrews (2002–2003)
- Darren Eliot (2004)
- Kip Lewis (2005)
- David Aldridge (2006)
- Nabil Karim (2024)
- Bridget Howard (2024)
- Tom Luginbill, College Football Playoff sideline reporter (2024)
- Taylor McGregor, College Football Playoff sideline reporter (2024)
- Laura Rutledge, College Football Playoff sideline reporter (2024)

==== Rules analysts ====
- Bill LeMonnier, College Football Playoff rules analyst (2024)

==== Studio hosts ====
- Kevin Christopher
- Marc Fein
- Ernie Johnson, Jr.
- Craig Sager

==== Studio analysts ====
- Brian Bosworth
- Paul Hornung
- Pepper Rodgers

=== See also ===
- List of Champs Sports Bowl broadcasters (1995 (December)–2000)
- List of Gator Bowl broadcasters (1992–1994)
- List of Insight Bowl broadcasters (1989–1991)
