= 1990 Colorado State Rams football team =

American college football season

1990 Colorado State Rams football

Freedom Bowl, W 32–31 vs. Oregon
- Conference: Western Athletic Conference
- Record: 9–4 (6–1 WAC)
- Head coach: Earle Bruce (2nd season)
- Defensive coordinator: Steve Szabo (2nd season)
- Home stadium: Hughes Stadium

1990 Western Athletic Conference football standings
	Conf.					Overall
Team	W		L		T	W		L		T
No. 22 BYU $	7	–	1	–	0	10	–	3	–	0
Colorado State	6	–	1	–	0	9	–	4	–	0
San Diego State	5	–	2	–	0	6	–	5	–	0
Wyoming	5	–	3	–	0	9	–	4	–	0
Hawaii	4	–	4	–	0	7	–	5	–	0
Air Force	3	–	4	–	0	7	–	5	–	0
Utah	2	–	6	–	0	4	–	7	–	0
New Mexico	1	–	6	–	0	2	–	10	–	0
UTEP	1	–	7	–	0	3	–	8	–	0
$ – Conference champion; Rankings from AP Poll

The 1990 Colorado State Rams football team represented Colorado State University in the Western Athletic Conference during the 1990 NCAA Division I-A football season. In their second season under head coach Earle Bruce, the Rams compiled a 9–4 record.

== Schedule ==
Date	Opponent	Site	Result	Attendance	Source
September 1	at Air Force	Falcon Stadium; Colorado Springs, CO (rivalry)	W 35–33	47,028	
September 8	Montana State*	Hughes Stadium; Fort Collins, CO	W 41–5	25,691	
September 15	at No. 25 Arizona State*	Sun Devil Stadium; Tempe, AZ	L 20–31	61,344	
September 22	UTEP	Hughes Stadium; Fort Collins, CO	W 38–20	26,541	
September 29	at No. 23 Arkansas*	War Memorial Stadium; Little Rock, AR	L 20–31	50,480	
October 6	Utah	Hughes Stadium; Fort Collins, CO	W 22–13	23,107	
October 13	at No. 13 BYU	Cougar Stadium; Provo, UT	L 9–52	65,922	
October 20	New Mexico	Hughes Stadium; Fort Collins, CO	W 47–7	28,301	
November 3	No. 19 Wyoming	Hughes Stadium; Fort Collins, CO (rivalry)	W 17–8	30,111	
November 10	Tulsa*	Hughes Stadium; Fort Collins, CO	W 31–13	25,710	
November 17	at Louisiana Tech*	Joe Aillet Stadium; Ruston, LA	L 30–31	15,225	
November 24	at Hawaii	Aloha Stadium; Halawa, HI	W 30–27	31,968	
December 29	vs. Oregon*	Anaheim Stadium; Anaheim, CA (Freedom Bowl)	W 32–31	51,103	
*Non-conference game; Rankings from Coaches' Poll released prior to the game

== Roster ==
1990 Colorado State Rams football team roster
Players
Coaches
Offense

Pos.	#	Name	Class
QB	14	Anthoney Hill	Fr
WR	27	Greg Primus	So
QB	13	Kevin Verduge	Jr
FB	41	Todd Yert	Sr

Defense

Pos.	#	Name	Class
CB	2	Selwyn Jones	Jr

Special teams

Pos.	#	Name	Class

Head coach

- Earle Bruce

Coordinators/assistant coaches

- Tim Salem
  (Special teams coordinator & running backs)
- Kit Cartwright
  (Assistant)

Legend

- (C) Team captain
- (S) Suspended
- (I) Ineligible
- Injured
- Redshirt
