= George Allen (American football coach) =

American football coach (1918–1990)

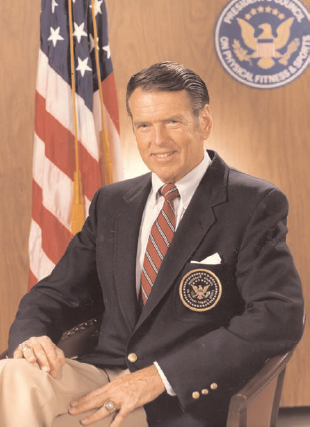
- Allen, c. 1981–1987

Personal information
- Born: April 29, 1918; Grosse Pointe, Michigan, U.S.
- Died: December 31, 1990 (aged 72); Rancho Palos Verdes, California, U.S.

Career information
- College: Michigan State Normal College; University of Michigan

Career history

Coaching
- Michigan (1947) Assistant coach (Note: In sprint football); Morningside (1948–1950) Head coach; Whittier (1951–1956) Head coach; Los Angeles Rams (1957) Offensive ends coach; Chicago Bears (1958–1965); Consultant (1958); Assistant coach (1959–1961); Defensive coordinator (1962–1965); Los Angeles Rams (1966–1970) Head coach; Washington Redskins (1971–1977) Head coach; Chicago Blitz (1983) Head coach; Arizona Wranglers (1984) Head coach; Long Beach State (1990) Head coach

Operations
- Chicago Bears (1958–1965) Head of player personnel; Washington Redskins (1971–1977) General manager

Awards and highlights
- As an assistant coach: NFL champion (1963); As a coach: 2× NFL Coach of the Year (1967, 1971); 80 Greatest Redskins; Washington Commanders Ring of Fame

Head coaching record
- Regular season: NFL: 116–47–5 (.705); USFL: 22–14 (.611); College: 53–38–7 (.577); Total: 191–99–12 (.652)
- Postseason: NFL: 2–7 (.222); USFL: 2–2 (.500); Total: 4–9 (.308)
- Career: NFL: 118–54–5 (.681); USFL: 24–16 (.600); College: 53–38–7 (.577); Total: 195–108–12 (.638)

Chairman of the President's Council on Physical Fitness and Sports
- In office 1981–1988
- President: Ronald Reagan
- Preceded by: Al McGuire
- Succeeded by: Dick Kazmaier

Personal details
- Spouse: Etty Lumbroso
- Children: George; Bruce; Gregory; Jennifer
- Coaching profile at Pro Football Reference
- Executive profile at Pro Football Reference
- Pro Football Hall of Fame

George Herbert Allen (April 29, 1918 – December 31, 1990) was an American football coach. He served as the head coach for two teams in the National Football League (NFL), the Los Angeles Rams from 1966 to 1970 and the Washington Redskins from 1971 to 1977. Allen led his teams to winning records in all 12 of his seasons as an NFL head coach, compiling an overall regular-season record of 116–47–5. Seven of his teams qualified for the NFL playoffs, including the 1972 Washington Redskins, who reached Super Bowl VII, losing to Don Shula's Miami Dolphins. Allen made a brief return as head coach of the Rams in 1978, but was fired before the regular season commenced.

Allen began his coaching career at the college football level, serving as head football coach at Morningside College from 1948 to 1950 and Whittier College from 1951 to 1956. He moved to the NFL in 1957 as an assistant coach for the Rams under head coach Sid Gillman. Allen then spent eight years, from 1958 to 1965, as an assistant coach and head of player personnel for the NFL's Chicago Bears before returning to the Rams as head coach in 1966.

After three years as a broadcaster for CBS Sports, from 1978 and 1981, and a short stint as an executive with the Montreal Alouettes of the Canadian Football League (CFL) in 1982, Allen resumed coaching in 1983 as head coach for the Chicago Blitz of the newly formed United States Football League (USFL). The following year, he served as head coach of the USFL's Arizona Wranglers, leading them to the league's title game, where the Wranglers lost to the Philadelphia Stars. After a second hiatus from coaching, Allen returned to the game a final time, serving as head football coach for one season, in 1990, at California State University, Long Beach. In ten seasons as a college football head coach, Allen amassed a record of 53–38–7.

Allen was inducted into the Pro Football Hall of Fame in 2002. His eldest son, also named George Allen, is a Republican politician who served as Governor of and United States Senator from Virginia. His second son, Bruce, followed his father's footsteps as a football coach and executive, serving as general manager for the Tampa Bay Buccaneers and the Redskins of the NFL.

== Early life ==
Born in the Grosse Pointe Woods district of Detroit, Allen was the son of Loretta M. and Earl Raymond Allen, who was recorded in the 1920 and 1930 U.S. census records for Wayne County, Michigan as working as a chauffeur to a private family. He earned varsity letters in football, track and basketball at Lake Shore High School in St. Clair Shores, Michigan and graduated in 1937.

Allen went to Alma College in Alma, Michigan and later at Marquette University in Milwaukee, where he was sent as an officer trainee in the United States Navy's V-12 Navy College Training Program. He graduated with a Bachelor of Science in education from Michigan State Normal College—now known as Eastern Michigan University—in Ypsilanti and then attended the University of Michigan in Ann Arbor, where he earned a Master of Science degree in physical education in 1947.

== Coaching career ==
=== Morningside ===
Allen was the head football coach at Morningside College—now known as Morningside University—in Sioux City, Iowa for three seasons, from 1948 to 1950. His coaching record at Morningside was 16–11–2.

=== Whittier ===
Allen was the head football coach at Whittier College in Whittier, California for six seasons, where he was 32–22–5 from 1951 through 1956. He was also the head baseball coach there from 1952 to 1957.

=== Assistant coach in the NFL ===
Allen joined the Los Angeles Rams staff in 1957, under fellow Hall of Fame coach Sid Gillman. Allen was dismissed after one season and, after he resided in Los Angeles out of football for several months, George Halas, founding owner and head coach of the Chicago Bears, brought him to Chicago during the 1958 season. The original purpose of Allen's hiring was to scout the Rams, whom the Bears would play twice during the season; Allen was asked for insights into Gillman's, and the Rams', offensive strategy and signals. Allen's thoroughness and attention to detail so impressed Halas that he eventually earned a full-time position on the coaching staff. During the latter stages of the 1962 season Allen replaced veteran Clark Shaughnessy as Halas' top defensive assistant, effectively making him the Bears' defensive coordinator.

His defensive schemes and tactics—and his strong motivational skills—helped make the Bears' unit one of the stingiest of its era. Allen's presence also had a formative effect on such future Hall of Fame players as linebacker Bill George and end Doug Atkins during their most productive years. By 1963, in his first full season in charge of the Bears' defense, Allen's innovative strategies helped the Bears yield a league-low 144 total points, 62 fewer than any other team, and earn an 11–1–2 record that was a half-game better than the two-time defending league champion Green Bay Packers and allowed the Bears to host the NFL championship game. Following their 14–10 victory over the New York Giants on December 29 at frigid Wrigley Field, the Bears' players awarded Allen the "game ball." NBC's post-game locker-room television coverage infamously captured Bears players singing "Hooray for George, hooray at last; hooray for George, he's a horse's ass!"

Allen was also given responsibility for the Bears' college player drafts; most likely his best-remembered choices were three players who won election to the Pro Football Hall of Fame and became household names in American sport—end Mike Ditka (chosen in 1961), halfback Gale Sayers, and middle linebacker Dick Butkus (1965). Allen's was the most common name to be suggested as a replacement for Halas should the grand old man of the league decide to step down. Jeff Davis's biography Papa Bear states that Halas informally told Allen in 1964 and 1965 that he would ultimately name him as head coach. But in 1965, after a 9–5 Bears finish that earned the iron-willed Halas NFL Coach of the Year honors, Allen decided to look elsewhere to fulfill his head-coaching ambitions. Halas stayed on as head coach through the 1967 season.

=== NFL head coaching career ===
==== Return to the Rams ====
On January 10, 1966, ex-Rams assistant coach Allen reached an agreement with Los Angeles Rams owner Dan Reeves to replace Harland Svare as head coach. He quickly faced a legal battle with Halas, who claimed that Allen's leaving was in breach of his Bears contract. (Halas accused Allen and the Rams of "chicanery.") The Bears' owner did win his case in a Chicago court but immediately allowed Allen to leave, saying he initiated the lawsuit to make a point about the validity of contracts. Halas would not be so magnanimous in an NFL meeting soon after when he attacked Allen's character. Upon hearing this, Green Bay coach Vince Lombardi joked to Reeves, "Sounds like you've got yourself a hell of a coach."

The Rams had only notched one winning season since 1956, and for much of that time been dwelling in or just above the NFL's basement. The team boasted considerable talent at several positions, most notably on the defensive line; the "Fearsome Foursome" (David Deacon Jones, Merlin Olsen, Rosey Grier, and Lamar Lundy) had gained vast attention on a losing team. Allen brought his well-known motivational skills to Los Angeles, and his twice-daily (sometimes three times) rigorous training-camp practices took players by surprise. He revealed the philosophy that he would be known for throughout his NFL career—acquiring veteran players for draft picks to fill specific roles. His motto was "the future is now." He also emphasized the role of special teams (kickoff, punt, and field-goal units) as integral to team success. He revamped the Rams' secondary with trades and installed quarterback Roman Gabriel, previously relegated to the bench, as his starter. Allen vaulted the Rams from a 4–10 record in 1965 to 8–6 in his first year—the team's first winning season since 1958. Allen received 1967 Coach of the Year honors for leading the Rams to an 11–1–2 record and the NFL Coastal Division title, their first post-season berth since 1955. Despite an 11–3 record (while winning their first 11 games) during the 1969 season and losing a conference playoff game to Joe Kapp and the Minnesota Vikings, the offense and the record did not rollover to the 1970 season and Allen was released at the end of season. The news surprised the football world, but subsequent reports revealed that discord between Reeves and Allen had been growing for some time. By some accounts, the owner's lower-key temperament differed from Allen's intense approach; more importantly, some animus had developed between the two men in November 1968. After the favored Rams struggled to a tie at San Francisco, Allen disparaged the sloppy Kezar Stadium turf; a few days later Reeves, addressing reporters, subtly admonished his coach for making what he considered an "alibi." The next week, after a narrow home win over the New York Giants, Allen rebuffed Reeves's handshake and upbraided him for "embarrassing me and my family."

Allen's firing was met not only with criticism from fans and reporters, but an overwhelming show of support from Ram players: 38 members of the team's 40-man roster, including such standouts as Gabriel, Jones, Olsen, Lundy, Dick Bass, Jack Snow, Bernie Casey, Tom Mack, Irv Cross, Ed Meador, and Jack Pardee, stated for the record that they would seek a trade or retire if Allen were not reinstated. Many of these players convened a press conference at a Los Angeles hotel to urge their employer, Reeves, to reconsider his decision. Allen, wearing dark glasses, spoke briefly to thank his players for their support but did not make an appeal for his job. After some negotiation Reeves offered Allen a new two-year contract, although there was no indication that the two men had reconciled their differences.

Allen and the 1969 Rams seemed to justify the coach's renewed presence; their 11–3 record earned them a Coastal Division title as Gabriel won the NFL's Most Valuable Player award. But in both 1969 and 1970 Allen's team could not produce the championship that many had predicted for them. At the end of 1970, with the Rams missing the playoffs and Allen's contract expiring, Reeves dismissed the coach again. It had been tacitly assumed that Allen had been granted the two extra years to bring the Rams a title, and so the second time the firing met with neither fan outrage nor player objection. Allen quietly left Los Angeles as the most successful coach in Rams history; he is currently fifth on the franchise's all-time wins list behind Sean McVay, John Robinson, Chuck Knox, and Mike Martz. He was replaced by UCLA head coach Tommy Prothro, almost Allen's opposite in personality and approach.

==== Washington Redskins ====
Allen was hired as head coach and general manager of the Washington Redskins on January 6, 1971. Shortly after joining the Redskins, Allen made a series of trades with his former Ram team and brought seven 1970 Los Angeles players to Washington, including the starting linebacker corps (Maxie Baughan, Myron Pottios, and Pardee). Sportswriters nicknamed the team the "Ramskins" or the "Redrams." Allen continued his practice of bringing in veteran players at all positions; one was quarterback Billy Kilmer, something of an NFL journeyman for a decade, whose wobbly but efficient passing and raw-boned leadership complemented and eventually supplanted strong-armed veteran Sonny Jurgensen. Allen restored the Redskins to competitiveness after over two decades of losing. The 1971 team was undefeated through late October and finished with a surprising 9–4–1 record and its first trip to the playoffs since 1945. Perhaps Allen's most satisfying 1971 victory was a 38–24 Monday night win in Los Angeles in December that clinched a playoff berth.

Allen's 1972 team, with Kilmer by now the starting quarterback, won the NFC East title with an 11–3 record; the defense allowed a conference-low 218 points on the way to a NFC title, which was secured with a 26–3 home victory over the defending Super Bowl champion Dallas Cowboys. The Redskins gained the chance to contest the undefeated Miami Dolphins for the world championship, a team they had beaten in the pre-season, but in Super Bowl VII at the Los Angeles Memorial Coliseum, the "'Skins" were overmatched by the Dolphins' relentless running game and staunch defense and lost, 14–7.

With Allen's attention to detail and enthusiastic approach, Washington's teams were known for their spirited play and camaraderie, with the coach often leading a chant of "Three Cheers for the Redskins" ("Hip Hip Hooray") in the locker room after wins. The Redskins acquired a reputation of a team that came by its success through hard work and workmanlike play that was rarely reflected in individual statistics. Becoming a household phrase among NFL fans was the "Over-the-Hill Gang"—the aging Redskin veterans who seemed to save their best efforts for the most important games. They reached the playoffs in five of Allen's seven years, but were not able to duplicate their 1972 Super Bowl trip. It was during this time that the Redskins' fierce rivalry with the Dallas Cowboys became a choice subject for pro football fans, and Allen inflamed it with bizarre actions like taunting Cowboys players while wearing an Indian headdress.

As had been the case with the Rams, Allen's intense approach was seen to indicate that winning in the present was all-important, with planning for the franchise's future taking a lesser priority. In 1977, the Redskins were 9–5, but failed to reach the postseason for the second time in three seasons. Although owner Williams did attempt to negotiate a new pact for Allen, there were rumors that he was beginning to question his coach's philosophy.

==== Third stint with the Rams ====
After rejecting a $1 million, four-year contract offer throughout the 1977 season, Allen was dismissed by the Redskins in mid-January 1978. He was replaced by one of his favorite players, Jack Pardee, by then the promising young head coach of the Bears, who had gained the wild card playoff berth ahead of the Redskins; both had finished at 9–5.

Rams owner Carroll Rosenbloom was searching for a new coach after parting ways with Chuck Knox, and decided to bring Allen back. Allen's hiring was announced on February 1, and he returned to Los Angeles in 1978 with much media fanfare. His second stint as the Rams' head coach was an unfortunate experience for all concerned. Unlike his first stint, Allen did not have full authority over personnel. He thus worked with general manager Don Klosterman to oversee a talented roster that had made the team a perennial playoff challenger.

Allen brought with him his scrupulous discipline and attention to detail, which extended to practice-field protocol and dining-hall decorum. However, his autocratic coaching style did not play well with the new generation of NFL players, and a group of Ram players chafed at the regulations almost immediately. Some made their grievances public; a few, including standout linebacker Isiah Robertson, briefly left camp. As newspaper reports were quoting players expressing confidence that differences would be resolved, the Rams played listlessly and lost the first two games of the 1978 exhibition schedule. Rosenbloom decided that an immediate change was needed to save the season, and announced Allen's firing on August 13. Many of Allen's own players were surprised by the decision. Defensive coordinator Ray Malavasi, well-respected and liked by players (and the only holdover from Chuck Knox' staff), replaced him; the Rams ultimately advanced to that year's NFC Championship Game and the following year to the Super Bowl. Rosenbloom died in April 1979.

Although he was off the sidelines for the first time in three decades, Allen was not unemployed for long. He soon joined CBS Sports as an analyst for NFL network telecasts, and worked in the broadcast booth from 1978 to 1981. For much of his tenure, he was part of CBS' number-two broadcast team with play-by-play announcer Vin Scully. During 1978, Scully and Allen were teamed with former NFL great Jim Brown as the network's only three-man broadcast team.

==== CFL, USFL, and Long Beach State ====
George Halas biographer Jeff Davis notes that Allen had contacted Halas in late 1981, asking to be considered for the vacant head coaching position with the Bears. However, Halas was still smarting at how Allen left the Bears 15 years earlier. He angrily rejected Allen's overtures and hired his old friend and former player Mike Ditka instead.

Allen had a brief flirtation with the Canadian Football League when he was hired by the Montreal Alouettes as president and chief operating manager on February 19, 1982. Allen also agreed to purchase 20 percent of the team, with an option to become the majority shareholder. However, three months later, Allen resigned after continued financial troubles and a shift in majority ownership from Nelson Skalbania to Harry Ornest soured Allen on the situation.

On June 21 of that same year, Allen became part-owner, chairman and head coach of the Chicago Blitz of the fledgling United States Football League, returning to the city where he had established his NFL coaching credentials two decades earlier. In his first season in 1983, the Blitz were tabbed as the early favorite to capture the league's inaugural title, in part because Allen assembled a roster laden with NFL veterans. The team finished in a tie for first with the Michigan Panthers with a 12–6 record, but the team lost the tiebreaker, making them the wild card team. In their playoff game against the Philadelphia Stars, the Blitz held a commanding 38–17 lead before a late comeback sent the game into overtime, where Chicago lost by a 44–38 score.

Two months after that collapse, the Blitz were part of a bizarre transaction in which the entire franchise was essentially traded for the Arizona Wranglers. Blitz owner Ted Diethrich was disgusted at the team's lackluster attendance figures. Looking for a way out, he found it when Wranglers owner Jim Joseph decided to get out after suffering massive losses of his own. The Diethrich/Allen group sold the Blitz to James Hoffman, then bought the Wranglers from Joseph. Diethrich and Hoffman then engineered a swap of assets that resulted in the 1983 Blitz roster moving virtually en masse to Arizona, while nearly all of the 1983 Wranglers moved to Chicago. Allen, who retained his posts as part-owner, chairman, and head coach, was thus able to retain much of the core of a roster that had been considered NFL-caliber.

During that 1984 season, Allen's Wranglers struggled early before finishing with a 10–8 mark, earning another wild card spot. In the opening round of the playoffs, Arizona staged a comeback to knock off the Houston Gamblers, 17–16. The following week, the Wranglers stopped the Los Angeles Express, 35–23, in the Western Conference final. However, the run of success came to an end in the USFL Championship Game, when Arizona was shut down in a 23–3 defeat.

In September 1984, Allen resigned his positions with the team after the Wranglers' financial troubles necessitated severe budget cuts.

Following several years out of the public eye, he accepted a one-year offer to coach at Long Beach State University in 1990. The 49ers, which had managed only 11 wins against 24 losses their previous three seasons, responded to Allen's mentoring with a 6–5 record.

Following Allen's death, the team played one additional season in 1991 under Willie Brown, then LBSU dropped the football program.

=== Legacy ===
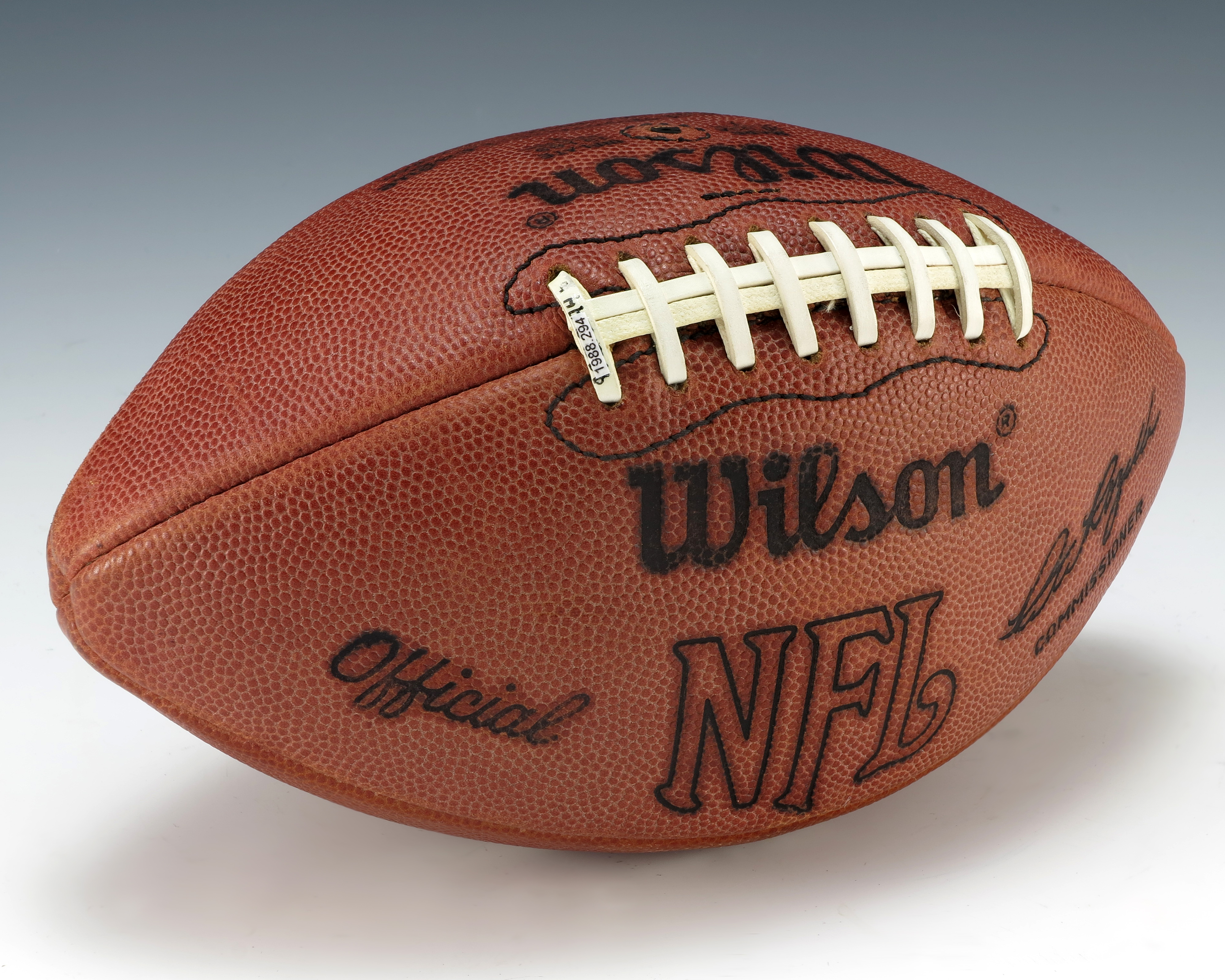
A football signed by George Allen and given to President Gerald Ford

Allen was considered one of the hardest-working coaches in football. He is credited by some with popularizing the coaching trend of 16-hour (or longer) work-days. He sometimes slept at the Redskin Park complex he designed. Allen's need for full organizational control and his wild spending habits would create friction between him and the team owners he worked for. Edward Bennett Williams, the Redskins' president, once famously said, "George was given an unlimited budget and he exceeded it." In ending Allen's second stint as the Rams' head coach after only two preseason games in 1978, Carroll Rosenbloom said, "I made a serious error of judgment in believing George could work within our framework." and "He got unlimited authority and exceeded it." Allen was also notorious for his paranoia, regularly believing that his practices were being spied upon and that his offices were bugged. He even went as far as being the first coach in the NFL to employ a full-time security man, Ed Boynton, to keep potential spies away and patrol the woods outside Redskin Park.

As documented by NFL Films, Allen was known to eat ice cream or peanut butter for many meals because it was easy to eat, and saved time so Allen could get back to preparing for the next game. Allen kept in shape as a coach, and would run several miles at the start of each day. He did not curse, smoke, or drink, instead habitually consuming milk (some suspected that this beverage of choice arose from ulcers they suspected the always-high-strung coach to suffer from). Coach Allen would later be appointed by President Ronald Reagan to the President's Council on Physical Fitness and Sports. It is interesting to note that President Richard Nixon (an armchair coach) once "recommended" the team run an end-around play by wide receiver Roy Jefferson. Allen agreed, choosing to run the play against the San Francisco 49ers in the 1971 NFC Divisional playoff game. Jefferson was tackled by the 49ers' Cedrick Hardman for a 13-yard loss on the play, a game the Redskins lost by four points.

==== Preferring veteran players over younger players ====
As a coach, Allen was known for his tendency to prefer veteran players to rookies and younger players. During Allen's early years with the Redskins, the team was known as the "Over-the-Hill Gang," due to the predominance of players over the age of 30, such as quarterback Billy Kilmer. Upon becoming Redskins coach, Allen traded for or acquired many players - all veterans of course - he had formerly coached with the Rams, including Jack Pardee, Richie Petitbon, Myron Pottios, John Wilbur, George Burman, and Diron Talbert, leading to the Redskins sometimes being referred to in those days as the "Ramskins." The phrase "the future is now" is often associated with Allen; he made 131 trades as an NFL coach, 81 of which came during his seven years with the Redskins.

==== Emphasizing special teams play ====
Allen was also known for emphasizing special teams play, and in 1969 became the NFL's first coach to hire a special teams coach, 32-year-old Dick Vermeil, to run a standalone special teams unit. (Jerry Williams followed suit a month later when he hired Marv Levy.) When Vermeil went to UCLA in 1970, Allen hired Levy, and then brought Levy with him to Washington in 1971. During the 1971 preseason, Allen coaxed his former long snapper with the Rams, George Burman, out of retirement, bringing him to Washington for the primary purpose of being the snapper on punts, thus making Burman the NFL's first modern specialist long snapper, while Sam Wyche was brought as a specialty Holder.

Allen's coaching tree led to several high-profile special teams coaches and achievements. Vermeil discovered special teams standout Vince Papale in 1976, won a Super Bowl as head coach of the St. Louis Rams, and coached return great Dante Hall with the Chiefs. Levy led the Buffalo Bills to four consecutive Super Bowl appearances in the early 1990s, while coaching perhaps the greatest special teams coverage man ever, Steve Tasker. Allen's longtime offensive assistant Ted Marchibroda gave Bill Belichick his first NFL coaching job. Both Vermeil and Levy would go on to employ Frank Gansz, whom Vermeil called "the finest special teams coach ever."

=== Notable accomplishments ===
Allen had the third-best winning percentage in the NFL (.681), exceeded only by Vince Lombardi (.736) and John Madden (.731). He also never coached an NFL team to a losing season. This was particularly notable in the case of the Redskins, who had finished above .500 only once over the past 15 seasons (1969, under Lombardi) before Allen's arrival.

Allen was noted primarily as a defensive innovator and a motivator. He was an early innovator in the use of sophisticated playbooks, well-organized drafts, use of special teams, and daring trades for veterans over new players. He is also known for sparking the Dallas Cowboys–Washington Redskins rivalry to new heights. In the seven seasons that Allen's team played the Cowboys, six of them saw the teams split the two contests they played before the Cowboys finally broke through in winning both contests in Allen's final season as coach in Washington; in total, Allen went 7–8 against the Cowboys in Washington but managed to reach the Super Bowl with Washington's victory over Dallas in the 1973 NFC Championship Game.

Allen was inducted to the Virginia Sports Hall of Fame in 1998. He was inducted to the Pro Football Hall of Fame in 2002.

== Personal life ==
=== Family ===
Allen married the former Henrietta (Etty) Lumbroso (1922–2013), with whom he had four children, three sons and one daughter. His son George became a Republican politician, having served as Governor and U.S. Senator from Virginia. Another son, Bruce, served as an executive for the Oakland Raiders, Tampa Bay Buccaneers, and Washington Redskins of the NFL. Allen's third son, Gregory, is a sports psychologist. His daughter, Jennifer, is an author.

=== Death ===
Allen died at age 72 from ventricular fibrillation in his home in Rancho Palos Verdes, California, on December 31, 1990.

There was some speculation afterward that his death may have been caused by a form of Gatorade shower. On November 17, some of his Long Beach State players dumped a Gatorade bucket filled with ice water on him following a season-ending victory over UNLV; in an interview some weeks later, Allen quipped that the university couldn't afford actual Gatorade, and said that he had felt somewhat unwell since then. The sports editor of the Long Beach State newspaper, the Daily Forty-Niner, recalled that the temperature was in the 50s with a biting wind. Allen stayed on the field for media interviews for a considerable length of time in his drenched clothing, and remained in his wet clothing on the bus back to Long Beach state.

However, in 2012, Allen's son George denied that the Gatorade shower caused the death, saying it merely caused a cold, and said that his father had a pre-existing heart arrhythmia. He stated that seeing Gatorade showers on television was a reminder that his father "went out a winner".

After Allen's death, the soccer and multipurpose field area on the lower end of campus was dedicated in his honor as George Allen Field. A youth baseball field in Palos Verdes Estates is also named after him.

== Head coaching record ==
=== Professional football ===
Year	Team	Regular season					Postseason			
Year	Team	Won	Lost	Ties	Win %	Finish	Won	Lost	Win %	Result
1966	LA	8	6	0	.571	3rd in Western	—	—	—	
1967	LA	11	1	2	.857	1st in Coastal	0	1	.000	Lost to Green Bay Packers in Conference Championship
1968	LA	10	3	1	.750	2nd in Coastal	—	—	—	
1969	LA	11	3	0	.786	1st in Coastal	0	1	.000	Lost to Minnesota Vikings in Conference Championship
1970	LA	9	4	1	.679	2nd in NFC West	—	—	—	
LA total		49	17	4	.729		0	2	.000	
1971	WAS	9	4	1	.679	2nd in NFC East	0	1	.000	Lost to San Francisco 49ers in NFC Divisional Game
1972	WAS	11	3	0	.786	1st in NFC East	2	1	.667	Lost to Miami Dolphins in Super Bowl VII
1973	WAS	10	4	0	.714	2nd in NFC East	0	1	.000	Lost to Minnesota Vikings in NFC Divisional Game
1974	WAS	10	4	0	.714	2nd in NFC East	0	1	.000	Lost to Los Angeles Rams in NFC Divisional Game
1975	WAS	8	6	0	.571	3rd in NFC East	—	—	—	
1976	WAS	10	4	0	.714	2nd in NFC East	0	1	.000	Lost to Minnesota Vikings in NFC Divisional Game
1977	WAS	9	5	0	.643	2nd in NFC East	—	—	—	
WAS total		67	30	1	.689		2	5	.286	
NFL total		116	47	5	.705		2	7	.222	
1983	CHI	12	6	0	.667	2nd in Central	0	1	.000	Lost to Philadelphia Stars in USFL Divisional playoffs
1984	ARZ	10	8	0	.556	2nd in Pacific	2	1	.667	Lost to Philadelphia Stars in USFL Championship Game
USFL total		22	14	0	.611		2	2	.500	

=== College football ===
Year	Team	Overall	Conference	Standing	Bowl/playoffs
Morningside Maroons (North Central Conference) (1948–1950)
1948	Morningside	3–6	2–4	T–4th	
1949	Morningside	7–3–1	3–2–1	T–3rd	
1950	Morningside	6–2–1	3–2–1	4th	
Morningside:		16–11–2	8–8–2		
Whittier Poets (Southern California Intercollegiate Athletic Conference) (1951–1956)
1951	Whittier	2–7	2–2	T–2nd	
1952	Whittier	9–1	4–0	1st	
1953	Whittier	6–3–1	2–2	T–3rd	
1954	Whittier	3–6–1	1–2–1	4th	
1955	Whittier	8–2	3–1	2nd	
1956	Whittier	4–3–3	2–1–1	T–2nd	
Whittier:		31–22–5	14–8–2		
Long Beach State 49ers (Big West Conference) (1990)
1990	Long Beach State	6–5	4–3	5th	
Long Beach State:		6–5	4–3		
Total:		53–38–7			
National championship Conference title Conference division title or championship game berth

== See also ==
- List of National Football League head coaches with 50 wins
