= 1990 Long Beach State 49ers football team =

American college football season

1990 Long Beach State 49ers football
- Conference: Big West Conference
- Record: 6–5 (4–3 Big West)
- Head coach: George Allen (1st season)
- Offensive coordinator: Pete Kettela (1st season)
- Defensive coordinator: Ken Visser (10th season)
- Home stadium: Veterans Stadium

1990 Big West Conference football standings
	Conf.					Overall
Team	W		L		T	W		L		T
San Jose State $	7	–	0	–	0	9	–	2	–	1
Fresno State	5	–	1	–	1	8	–	2	–	1
Utah State	5	–	1	–	1	5	–	5	–	1
Long Beach State	4	–	3	–	0	6	–	5	–	0
UNLV	3	–	4	–	0	4	–	7	–	0
Pacific (CA)	2	–	5	–	0	4	–	7	–	0
New Mexico State	1	–	6	–	0	1	–	10	–	0
Cal State Fullerton	0	–	7	–	0	1	–	11	–	0
$ – Conference champion

The 1990 Long Beach State 49ers football team represented California State University, Long Beach (Note: The official name of Long Beach State has been California State University, Long Beach since 1972. However, it is still commonly known as Long Beach State.) during the 1990 NCAA Division I-A football season.

Cal State Long Beach competed in the Big West Conference. The team was led by ex-NFL head coach George Allen, and played home games at Veterans Stadium on the campus of Long Beach City College in Long Beach, California. The 49ers offense scored 249 points while the defense allowed 331 points.

Allen died shortly after the end of the 1990 season and was inducted posthumously into the Pro Football Hall of Fame in 2002.

== Schedule ==
Date	Time	Opponent	Site	Result	Attendance	Source
September 1	10:00 am	at No. 10 Clemson*	Memorial Stadium; Clemson, SC	L 0–59	72,500	
September 8	12:00 pm	at Utah State	Romney Stadium; Logan, UT	L 13–27	15,687	
September 15	7:05 pm	at San Diego State*	Jack Murphy Stadium; San Diego, CA	L 20–38	19,170	
September 22	1:00 pm	Pacific (CA)	Veterans Stadium; Long Beach, CA	W 28–7	5,366	
September 29	1:00 pm	Boise State	Veterans Memorial Stadium; Long Beach, CA	W 21–20	4,106	
October 6	1:00 pm	New Mexico State	Veterans Stadium; Long Beach, CA	W 31–27	3,925	
October 13	6:00 pm	at San Jose State	Spartan Stadium; San Jose, CA	L 29–46	14,938	
October 20	7:00 pm	at Fresno State	Bulldog Stadium; Fresno, CA	L 16–28	32,219	
October 27	1:00 pm	Cal State Fullerton^{†}	Veterans Stadium; Long Beach, CA	W 37–35	7,042	
November 10	1:00 pm	Cal State Northridge	Veterans Memorial Stadium; Long Beach, CA	W 25–24	3,090	
November 17	1:00 pm	UNLV	Veterans Stadium; Long Beach, CA	W 29–20	4,649	
*Non-conference game; ^{†}Homecoming; Rankings from AP Poll released prior to the game; All times are in Pacific time

== Team players in the NFL ==
The following were selected in the 1991 NFL draft.

Player	Position	Round	Overall	NFL team
Shawn Wilbourn	Defensive back	5	138	Buffalo Bills
