= 1990 Utah State Aggies football team =

American college football season

1990 Utah State Aggies football
- Conference: Big West Conference
- Record: 5–5–1 (5–1–1 Big West)
- Head coach: Chuck Shelton (5th season)
- Offensive coordinator: Pat Behrns (2nd season)
- Defensive coordinator: Fred Bleil (5th season)
- Home stadium: Romney Stadium

1990 Big West Conference football standings
	Conf.					Overall
Team	W		L		T	W		L		T
San Jose State $	7	–	0	–	0	9	–	2	–	1
Fresno State	5	–	1	–	1	8	–	2	–	1
Utah State	5	–	1	–	1	5	–	5	–	1
Long Beach State	4	–	3	–	0	6	–	5	–	0
UNLV	3	–	4	–	0	4	–	7	–	0
Pacific (CA)	2	–	5	–	0	4	–	7	–	0
New Mexico State	1	–	6	–	0	1	–	10	–	0
Cal State Fullerton	0	–	7	–	0	1	–	11	–	0
$ – Conference champion

The 1990 Utah State Aggies football team represented Utah State University during the 1990 NCAA Division I-A football season as a member of the Big West Conference. The Aggies were led by fifth-year head coach Chuck Shelton and played their home games at Romney Stadium in Logan, Utah. They finished the season with a record of five wins, five losses, and one tie (5–5–1, 5–1–1 Big West).

Utah State finished Big West play tied for second in the conference standings with Fresno State, losing only to eventual conference champion San Jose State. The 1990 season would mark the high point of the Chuck Shelton era at Utah State, as the Aggies finished with a .500 winning percentage (the first time the Aggies had a non-losing record since the 1981 season).

== Schedule ==
Date	Opponent	Site	Result	Attendance	Source
September 1	Utah*	Romney Stadium; Logan, UT (Battle of the Brothers, Beehive Boot)	L 0–19	19,631	
September 8	Long Beach State	Romney Stadium; Logan, UT	W 27–13	15,687	
September 15	at Missouri*	Faurot Field; Columbia, MO	L 10–45	33,986	
October 6	at No. 22 Oregon*	Autzen Stadium; Eugene, OR	L 7–52	32,554	
October 13	at Fresno State	Bulldog Stadium; Fresno, CA	T 24–24	33,519	
October 20	at San Jose State	Spartan Stadium; San Jose, CA	L 27–34	11,834	
October 27	UNLV	Romney Stadium; Logan, UT	W 31–6	15,273	
November 3	New Mexico State	Romney Stadium; Logan, UT	W 55–10	9,970	
November 10	at Cal State Fullerton	Santa Ana Stadium; Santa Ana, CA	W 45–17	4,110	
November 17	Pacific (CA)	Romney Stadium; Logan, UT	W 51–45	14,905	
November 24	at No. 4 BYU*	Cougar Stadium; Provo, UT (rivalry, Beehive Boot)	L 10–45	65,876	
*Non-conference game; Rankings from AP Poll released prior to the game
