= 1990 Wyoming Cowboys football team =

American college football season

1990 Wyoming Cowboys football

Copper Bowl, L 15–17 vs. California
- Conference: Western Athletic Conference
- Record: 9–4 (5–3 WAC)
- Head coach: Paul Roach (4th season)
- Home stadium: War Memorial Stadium

1990 Western Athletic Conference football standings
| | Conf. | | | | | Overall |
| Team | W | | L | | T | W | | L | | T |
|---|---|---|---|---|---|---|---|---|---|---|
| No. 22 BYU $ | 7 | – | 1 | – | 0 | 10 | – | 3 | – | 0 |
| Colorado State | 6 | – | 1 | – | 0 | 9 | – | 4 | – | 0 |
| San Diego State | 5 | – | 2 | – | 0 | 6 | – | 5 | – | 0 |
| Wyoming | 5 | – | 3 | – | 0 | 9 | – | 4 | – | 0 |
| Hawaii | 4 | – | 4 | – | 0 | 7 | – | 5 | – | 0 |
| Air Force | 3 | – | 4 | – | 0 | 7 | – | 5 | – | 0 |
| Utah | 2 | – | 6 | – | 0 | 4 | – | 7 | – | 0 |
| New Mexico | 1 | – | 6 | – | 0 | 2 | – | 10 | – | 0 |
| UTEP | 1 | – | 7 | – | 0 | 3 | – | 8 | – | 0 |
$ – Conference champion; Rankings from AP Poll

The 1990 Wyoming Cowboys football team represented the University of Wyoming in the 1990 NCAA Division I-A football season. It was the Cowboys' 95th season and they competed as a member of the Western Athletic Conference (WAC). The team was led by head coach Paul Roach, in his fourth year, and played their home games at War Memorial Stadium in Laramie, Wyoming. They finished with a record of nine wins and four losses (9–4, 5–3 WAC) and with a loss in the Copper Bowl. The Cowboys offense scored 327 points, while the defense allowed 297 points.

== Schedule ==
| Date | Opponent | Rank | Site | TV | Result | Attendance | Source |
|---|---|---|---|---|---|---|---|
| September 1 | Temple* | | War Memorial Stadium; Laramie, WY | | W 38–23 | 17,654 | |
| September 8 | at Washington State* | | Martin Stadium; Pullman, WA | | W 34–30 | 30,484 | |
| September 15 | Arkansas State* | | War Memorial Stadium; Laramie, WY | | W 34–27 | 18,433 | |
| September 22 | Air Force | | War Memorial Stadium; Laramie, WY | | W 24–12 | 27,463 | |
| September 29 | at Utah | | Robert Rice Stadium; Salt Lake City, UT | | W 28–10 | 31,051 | |
| October 6 | San Diego State | | War Memorial Stadium; Laramie, WY | | W 52–51 | 16,713 | |
| October 13 | New Mexico | No. 23 | War Memorial Stadium; Laramie, WY | | W 25–22 | 21,336 | |
| October 20 | Weber State* | No. 21 | War Memorial Stadium; Laramie, WY | | W 21–12 | 12,959 | |
| October 27 | at UTEP | No. 18 | Sun Bowl; El Paso, TX | | W 17–10 | 16,694 | |
| November 3 | at Colorado State | No. 19 | Hughes Stadium; Fort Collins, CO (Border War) | | L 8–17 | 30,111 | |
| November 10 | No. 8 BYU | No. 25 | War Memorial Stadium; Laramie, WY | | L 14–45 | 34,231 | |
| November 17 | at Hawaii | | Aloha Stadium; Halawa, HI (rivalry) | | L 17–38 | 39,103 | |
| December 31 | vs. California* | | Arizona Stadium; Tucson, AZ (Copper Bowl) | TBS | L 15–17 | 36,340 | |
*Non-conference game; Rankings from AP Poll released prior to the game

== Team players in the NFL ==
The following were selected in the 1991 NFL draft.

| Player | Position | Round | Overall | NFL team |
| Mitch Donahue | Linebacker | 4 | 95 | San Francisco 49ers |
| Shawn Wiggins | Wide receiver | 9 | 239 | Cleveland Browns |
