= 1990 New Mexico Lobos football team =

American college football season

1990 New Mexico Lobos football
- Conference: Western Athletic Conference
- Record: 2–10 (1–6 WAC)
- Head coach: Mike Sheppard (4th season)
- Offensive coordinator: Jan Quarless (1st season)
- Defensive coordinator: Greg Newhouse (1st season)
- Home stadium: University Stadium

1990 Western Athletic Conference football standings
	Conf.					Overall
Team	W		L		T	W		L		T
No. 22 BYU $	7	–	1	–	0	10	–	3	–	0
Colorado State	6	–	1	–	0	9	–	4	–	0
San Diego State	5	–	2	–	0	6	–	5	–	0
Wyoming	5	–	3	–	0	9	–	4	–	0
Hawaii	4	–	4	–	0	7	–	5	–	0
Air Force	3	–	4	–	0	7	–	5	–	0
Utah	2	–	6	–	0	4	–	7	–	0
New Mexico	1	–	6	–	0	2	–	10	–	0
UTEP	1	–	7	–	0	3	–	8	–	0
$ – Conference champion; Rankings from AP Poll

The 1990 New Mexico Lobos football team was an American football team that represented the University of New Mexico in the Western Athletic Conference (WAC) during the 1990 NCAA Division I-A football season. In their fourth season under head coach Mike Sheppard, the Lobos compiled a 2–10 record (1–6 against WAC opponents) and were outscored by a total of 400 to 279.

The team's statistical leaders included Jeremy Leach with 2,428 passing yards, Aaron Givens with 546 rushing yards, Eric Morgan with 1,043 receiving yards, and kicker David Margolis with 67 points scored.

== Schedule ==
Date	Opponent	Site	Result	Attendance	Source
September 1	at New Mexico State*	Aggie Memorial Stadium; Las Cruces, NM (rivalry)	W 29–12	24,138	
September 8	at Fresno State*	Bulldog Stadium; Fresno, CA	L 17–24	34,097	
September 15	No. 20 Arizona*	University Stadium; Albuquerque, NM (rivalry)	L 10–25	23,037	
September 22	Texas Tech*^{†}	University Stadium; Albuquerque, NM	L 32–34	15,530	
September 29	at Kansas State*	KSU Stadium; Manhattan, KS	L 6–38	22,812	
October 6	UTEP	University Stadium; Albuquerque, NM	W 48–28	17,932	
October 13	at No. 23 Wyoming	War Memorial Stadium; Laramie, WY	L 22–25	21,336	
October 20	at Colorado State	Hughes Stadium; Fort Collins, CO	L 7–47	28,301	
October 27	at No. 9 BYU	Cougar Stadium; Provo, UT	L 31–55	66,086	
November 3	at Hawaii	Aloha Stadium; Halawa, HI	L 16–43	32,767	
November 10	Utah	University Stadium; Albuquerque, NM	L 27–29	10,431	
November 17	San Diego State	University Stadium; Albuquerque, NM	L 34–40	7,868	
*Non-conference game; ^{†}Homecoming; Rankings from AP Poll released prior to the game
