= 1990 Hawaii Rainbow Warriors football team =

American college football season

1990 Hawaii Rainbow Warriors football
- Conference: Western Athletic Conference
- Record: 7–5 (4–4 WAC)
- Head coach: Bob Wagner (4th season)
- Offensive coordinator: Paul Johnson (4th season)
- Offensive scheme: Triple option
- Defensive coordinator: Rich Ellerson (4th season)
- Base defense: 4–3
- Home stadium: Aloha Stadium

1990 Western Athletic Conference football standings
| | Conf. | | | | | Overall |
| Team | W | | L | | T | W | | L | | T |
|---|---|---|---|---|---|---|---|---|---|---|
| No. 22 BYU $ | 7 | – | 1 | – | 0 | 10 | – | 3 | – | 0 |
| Colorado State | 6 | – | 1 | – | 0 | 9 | – | 4 | – | 0 |
| San Diego State | 5 | – | 2 | – | 0 | 6 | – | 5 | – | 0 |
| Wyoming | 5 | – | 3 | – | 0 | 9 | – | 4 | – | 0 |
| Hawaii | 4 | – | 4 | – | 0 | 7 | – | 5 | – | 0 |
| Air Force | 3 | – | 4 | – | 0 | 7 | – | 5 | – | 0 |
| Utah | 2 | – | 6 | – | 0 | 4 | – | 7 | – | 0 |
| New Mexico | 1 | – | 6 | – | 0 | 2 | – | 10 | – | 0 |
| UTEP | 1 | – | 7 | – | 0 | 3 | – | 8 | – | 0 |
$ – Conference champion; Rankings from AP Poll

The 1990 Hawaii Rainbow Warriors football team represented the University of Hawaiʻi at Mānoa in the Western Athletic Conference during the 1990 NCAA Division I-A football season. In their fourth season under head coach Bob Wagner, the Rainbow Warriors compiled a 7–5 record.

== Schedule ==
| Date | Opponent | Site | Result | Attendance | Source |
|---|---|---|---|---|---|
| September 1 | No. 13 Texas A&M* | Aloha Stadium; Halawa, HI | L 13–28 | 38,237 | |
| September 8 | at Air Force | Falcon Stadium; Colorado Springs, CO (rivalry) | L 3–27 | 40,213 | |
| September 22 | at Utah | Robert Rice Stadium; Salt Lake City, UT | W 19–7 | 29,140 | |
| October 6 | Maine* | Aloha Stadium; Halawa, HI | W 44–3 | 35,938 | |
| October 13 | at UTEP | Sun Bowl; El Paso, TX | L 10–12 | 16,121 | |
| October 20 | Cal State Fullerton* | Aloha Stadium; Halawa, HI | W 45–21 | 37,712 | |
| October 27 | Pacific (CA)*^{†} | Aloha Stadium; Halawa, HI | W 35–24 | 33,810 | |
| November 3 | New Mexico | Aloha Stadium; Halawa, HI | W 43–16 | 32,767 | |
| November 10 | at San Diego State | Jack Murphy Stadium; San Diego, CA | L 38–44 | 20,450 | |
| November 17 | Wyoming | Aloha Stadium; Halawa, HI (rivalry) | W 38–17 | 39,103 | |
| November 24 | Colorado State | Aloha Stadium; Halawa, HI | L 27–30 | 31,968 | |
| December 1 | No. 4 BYU | Aloha Stadium; Halawa, HI | W 59–28 | 45,729 | |
*Non-conference game; ^{†}Homecoming; Rankings from AP Poll released prior to the game
