= 1990 Cal State Fullerton Titans football team =

American college football season

1990 Cal State Fullerton Titans football
- Conference: Big West Conference
- Record: 1–11 (0–7 Big West)
- Head coach: Gene Murphy (11th season)
- Offensive coordinator: Bill Wentworth (2nd season)
- Defensive coordinator: Kirk Harmon (3rd season)
- Home stadium: Santa Ana Stadium

1990 Big West Conference football standings
	Conf.					Overall
Team	W		L		T	W		L		T
San Jose State $	7	–	0	–	0	9	–	2	–	1
Fresno State	5	–	1	–	1	8	–	2	–	1
Utah State	5	–	1	–	1	5	–	5	–	1
Long Beach State	4	–	3	–	0	6	–	5	–	0
UNLV	3	–	4	–	0	4	–	7	–	0
Pacific (CA)	2	–	5	–	0	4	–	7	–	0
New Mexico State	1	–	6	–	0	1	–	10	–	0
Cal State Fullerton	0	–	7	–	0	1	–	11	–	0
$ – Conference champion

The 1990 Cal State Fullerton Titans football team represented California State University, Fullerton as a member of the Big West Conference during the 1990 NCAA Division I-A football season. Led by 11th-year head coach Gene Murphy, Cal State Fullerton compiled an overall record of 1–11 with a mark of 0–7 in conference play, placing last out of eight teams in the Big West. This was the worst record posted by the Titans in the 23 years they fielded an intercollegiate football team (1970–1992). The team their home games at Santa Ana Stadium in Santa Ana, California.

== Schedule ==
Date	Opponent	Site	Result	Attendance	Source
September 1	Sonoma State*	Santa Ana Stadium; Santa Ana, CA	W 38–24	2,091	
September 8	at No. 3 Auburn*	Jordan-Hare Stadium; Auburn, AL	L 17–38	77,500	
September 15	at Mississippi State*	Scott Field; Mississippi State, MS	L 13–27	22,240	
September 22	at Akron*	Rubber Bowl; Akron, OH	L 17–48	10,241	
September 29	at No. 24 Fresno State	Bulldog Stadium; Fresno, CA	L 3–38	33,624	
October 6	at UNLV	Sam Boyd Silver Bowl; Whitney, NV	L 10–29	13,791	
October 13	Pacific (CA)	Santa Ana Stadium; Santa Ana, CA	L 37–67	2,013	
October 20	at Hawaii*	Aloha Stadium; Halawa, HI	L 21–45	37,712	
October 27	at Long Beach State	Veterans Stadium; Long Beach, CA	L 35–37	7,042	
November 3	at San Jose State	Spartan Stadium; San Jose, CA	L 6–44	11,256	
November 10	Utah State	Santa Ana Stadium; Santa Ana, CA	L 17–45	4,110	
November 17	at New Mexico State	Aggie Memorial Stadium; Las Cruces, NM	L 9–43	19,227	
*Non-conference game; Rankings from AP Poll released prior to the game

== Team players in the NFL ==
The following Cal State Fullerton Titans were selected in the 1991 NFL draft.

Player	Position	Round	Overall	NFL team
Reggie Redding	Guard, tackle	5	121	Atlanta Falcons
