= 1990 Air Force Falcons football team =

American college football season

1990 Air Force Falcons football
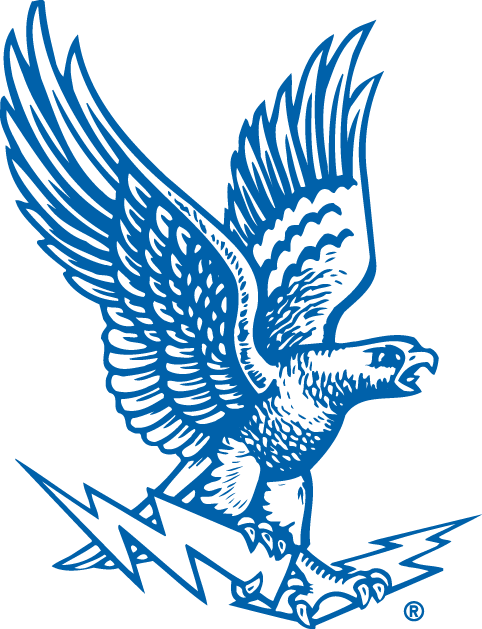

Liberty Bowl champion

Liberty Bowl, W 23–11 vs. Ohio State
- Conference: Western Athletic Conference
- Record: 7–5 (3–4 WAC)
- Head coach: Fisher DeBerry (7th season)
- Offensive coordinator: Paul Hamilton (1st season)
- Offensive scheme: Wishbone triple option
- Defensive coordinator: Cal McCombs (1st season)
- Captains: Lane Beene; Brian Hill; Rodney Lewis; J. T. Tokish
- Home stadium: Falcon Stadium

1990 Western Athletic Conference football standings
	Conf.					Overall
Team	W		L		T	W		L		T
No. 22 BYU $	7	–	1	–	0	10	–	3	–	0
Colorado State	6	–	1	–	0	9	–	4	–	0
San Diego State	5	–	2	–	0	6	–	5	–	0
Wyoming	5	–	3	–	0	9	–	4	–	0
Hawaii	4	–	4	–	0	7	–	5	–	0
Air Force	3	–	4	–	0	7	–	5	–	0
Utah	2	–	6	–	0	4	–	7	–	0
New Mexico	1	–	6	–	0	2	–	10	–	0
UTEP	1	–	7	–	0	3	–	8	–	0
$ – Conference champion; Rankings from AP Poll

The 1990 Air Force Falcons football team season represented the United States Air Force Academy in the 1990 NCAA Division I-A football season. The team was led by seventh season head coach Fisher DeBerry and played its home games at Falcon Stadium. The Falcons finished the season with a 6–5 record overall and a 3–4 record in Western Athletic Conference games. The team was selected to play in the Liberty Bowl, in which it defeated Ohio State.

== Schedule ==
Date	Opponent	Site	TV	Result	Attendance	Source
September 1	Colorado State	Falcon Stadium; Colorado Springs, CO (rivalry)		L 33–35	47,028	
September 8	Hawaii	Falcon Stadium; Colorado Springs, CO (rivalry)		W 27–3	40,213	
September 15	No. 20 (I-AA) The Citadel*	Falcon Stadium; Colorado Springs, CO		W 10–7	37,412	
September 22	at Wyoming	War Memorial Stadium; Laramie, WY		L 12–24	27,463	
September 29	at San Diego State	Jack Murphy Stadium; San Diego, CA		L 18–48	19,104	
October 6	Navy*	Falcon Stadium; Colorado Springs, CO		W 24–7	50,821	
October 13	at No. 8 Notre Dame*	Notre Dame Stadium; Notre Dame, IN (rivalry)		L 27–57	59,075	
October 27	Utah	Falcon Stadium; Colorado Springs, CO		W 52–21	40,798	
November 3	No. 10 BYU	Falcon Stadium; Colorado Springs, CO		L 7–54	26,513	
November 10	at Army*	Michie Stadium; West Point, NY		W 15–3	30,144	
November 17	at UTEP	Sun Bowl; El Paso, TX		W 14–13	32,666	
December 27	vs. No. 24 Ohio State*	Liberty Bowl Memorial Stadium; Memphis, TN (Liberty Bowl)	ESPN	W 23–11	39,262	
*Non-conference game; Rankings from AP Poll released prior to the game

== Roster ==
1990 Air Force Falcons football team roster
Players
Coaches
Offense

Pos.	#	Name	Class
QB		Rob Perez	Jr

Defense

Pos.	#	Name	Class
CB		Carlton McDonald	So
LB		Vergil Simpson	So

Special teams

Pos.	#	Name	Class
K		Joe Wood

Head coach

- Fisher DeBerry

Coordinators/assistant coaches

Legend

- (C) Team captain
- (S) Suspended
- (I) Ineligible
- Injured
- Redshirt
