= Paul Roach =

American football player, coach, and administrator (1927–2023)

Biographical details
- Born: October 24, 1927; Spring Green, Wisconsin, U.S.
- Died: September 3, 2023 (aged 95); Pullman, Washington, U.S.

Playing career
- 1948–1951: Black Hills State
- Positions: End, back

Coaching career (HC unless noted)
- 1952–1953: Hettinger HS (ND)
- 1954–1956: Dickinson HS (ND)
- 1957–1961: North Dakota (B)
- 1962–1969: Wyoming (OB/OC)
- 1970–1971: Wisconsin (OC)
- 1972–1974: Oakland Raiders (OB)
- 1975–1976: Green Bay Packers (OC)
- 1977–1980: Denver Broncos (OB)
- 1987–1990: Wyoming

Administrative career (AD unless noted)
- 1986–1996: Wyoming

Head coaching record
- Overall: 35–15 (college)
- Bowls: 0–3

Accomplishments and honors

Championships
- 2 WAC (1987–1988)

Awards
- 2× WAC Coach of the Year (1987–1988)

Paul Louis Roach (October 24, 1927 – September 3, 2023) was an American football player, coach, and college athletics administrator. He was the head football coach of the Wyoming Cowboys from 1987 to 1990, also serving as the University of Wyoming's athletic director from 1986 to 1996.

A native of Spring Green, Wisconsin, Roach attended what is now Black Hills State University from 1948 to 1951, earning all-conference honors in football twice. After graduating, he began a coaching career, serving with high schools through 1956 before getting his first college position as an assistant for the North Dakota Fighting Sioux in 1957. After five seasons with the team, he served as an assistant with the Wyoming Cowboys from 1962 to 1969. He followed it with two years as the offensive coordinator of the Wisconsin Badgers before entering the professional ranks as an assistant with the Oakland Raiders in 1972. He served three years with the Raiders, then two years as offensive coordinator of the Green Bay Packers, and assisted the Denver Broncos from 1977 to 1980.

After several years out of coaching, Roach was named the athletic director of Wyoming in 1986 and one year later was chosen as their head football coach. He was head coach for four seasons with the Cowboys and led the team, which had compiled poor records in the past years, to several successful seasons, being named the Western Athletic Conference Coach of the Year in 1987 and 1988, as well as a finalist for the National Coach of the Year award while bringing Wyoming to two straight league championships and two bowl game appearances. He retired after leading them to a third bowl game appearance in 1990, finishing with an overall record of 35–15, which ranks as one of the best winning percentages (.700) in team history.

== Early life and education ==
Roach was born on October 24, 1927, in Spring Green, Wisconsin. He attended Central High School in Rapid City, South Dakota, and then served in the United States Army in World War II from 1945 to 1947. He attended Black Hills Teacher's College (now known as Black Hills State University) from 1948 to 1951 and was a letterman in three sports: football for four years, basketball for two years and track for one year. Roach earned all-conference honors in football two or three times (Note: Sources conflict.) while playing end and in the backfield and was team captain as a senior. He graduated in 1952 and began his coaching career the same year, having received bachelor's degrees in mathematics and physical education.

== Coaching career ==
Roach began his coaching career by serving as the head football coach and track coach at Hettinger High School in North Dakota from 1952 to 1953. He led the football team to a record of 13–2 during his tenure and helped the track team place second at the state tournament. He was named the head football and basketball coach at Dickinson High School in 1954, serving through 1956 in that position. He was the runner-up for the Associated Press (AP) North Dakota High School Coach of the Year award in 1955, led the basketball team to a second-place finish at the state championship that year and compiled a record of 14–8–2 in total as football coach.

After his time at Dickinson, Roach received his first college coaching job as backfield coach of the North Dakota Fighting Sioux in 1957 and remained in that role through 1961. He coached while studying for a master's degree (which he received in 1962) and helped the team win the conference championship in 1958 while being runner-up twice. When he left North Dakota in 1962, he was named offensive backfield coach of the Wyoming Cowboys. He served with them until 1970, also being their offensive coordinator, helping the Cowboys win three straight conference championships from 1966 to 1968, as well as win the 1966 Sun Bowl and appear in the 1968 Sugar Bowl.

Roach was hired by the Wisconsin Badgers in 1970 and served as their offensive coordinator for two seasons, being their primary play-caller in this role. In 1972, Roach received his first professional position as offensive backfield coach of the Oakland Raiders. He served in this role for three years under head coach John Madden, helping the Raiders win the AFC West divisional championship three times, while also reaching the AFC Championship Game once.

Roach developed a reputation as one of the best "offensive minds" in the NFL and was hired as offensive coordinator by the Green Bay Packers in 1975, the first person to hold the position for the Packers. After the team went 4–10 in 1975 and 5–9 the following year, Roach was let go prior to the 1977 season. He then joined the Denver Broncos as offensive backfield coach and helped them reach Super Bowl XII in 1977 while also reaching the playoffs in 1978 and 1979. He was not retained following the 1980 season.

Roach spent several seasons out of coaching following his stint with Denver, serving as the president and co-owner of Western Pro Sports, Inc., for five years and with Western Financial Services, which was a negotiating agency with professional football players. He returned to the Wyoming Cowboys in 1985 as director of its Cowboy Joe Club, and after one year in that position was named the athletic director in July 1986, succeeding Gary Cunningham, who left for Fresno State. In January 1987, head coach Dennis Erickson abruptly left after one season for Washington State, and Roach became his successor, his first head coaching job at the collegiate level despite turning sixty years old that year.

Roach served as football coach and athletic director simultaneously. In his first two years, he led the Cowboys—which had gone 27–32 in the prior five seasons—to an overall record of 21–5, two consecutive conference championships and two bowl games. His teams went undefeated against conference opponents in both years and Roach was selected as the Western Athletic Conference Coach of the Year twice, as well as being the Kodak Region V Coach of the Year in 1987 and twice being a finalist for the National Coach of the Year award. He coached two more seasons with Wyoming before retiring, leading them to another bowl game in 1990 while finishing with a four-year record of 35–15 (.700). Roach became widely popular and a "legend in Wyoming sports history" for his success with the team, even receiving votes in the 1990 Wyoming gubernatorial election despite not running. He continued as athletic director until his retirement in 1996.

== Personal life, honors and death ==
Roach was married to his wife Marge. He has been inducted into several halls of fame, including into the Black Hills State Athletics Hall of Fame in 1984, the South Dakota Sports Hall of Fame in 1992, the Wyoming Coaches Association Hall of Fame in 1996, the University of Wyoming Athletics Hall of Fame in 1999, and the Wyoming Sports Hall of Fame in 2003. Roach died on September 3, 2023, at age 95 in Pullman, Washington.

== Head coaching record ==
=== College ===
Year	Team	Overall	Conference	Standing	Bowl/playoffs	Coaches^{#}	AP^{°}
Wyoming Cowboys (Western Athletic Conference) (1987–1990)
1987	Wyoming	10–3	8–0	1st	L Holiday		
1988	Wyoming	11–2	8–0	1st	L Holiday	20	
1989	Wyoming	5–6	5–3	4th			
1990	Wyoming	9–4	5–3	4th	L Copper		
Wyoming:		35–15	4–4				
Total:		26–8					
National championship Conference title Conference division title or championship game berth
^{#}Rankings from final Coaches Poll.; ^{°}Rankings from final AP Poll.
