= 1990 Fresno State Bulldogs football team =

American college football season

1990 Fresno State Bulldogs football
- Conference: Big West Conference
- Record: 8–2–1 (5–1–1 Big West)
- Head coach: Jim Sweeney (13th season)
- Home stadium: Bulldog Stadium

1990 Big West Conference football standings
	Conf.					Overall
Team	W		L		T	W		L		T
San Jose State $	7	–	0	–	0	9	–	2	–	1
Fresno State	5	–	1	–	1	8	–	2	–	1
Utah State	5	–	1	–	1	5	–	5	–	1
Long Beach State	4	–	3	–	0	6	–	5	–	0
UNLV	3	–	4	–	0	4	–	7	–	0
Pacific (CA)	2	–	5	–	0	4	–	7	–	0
New Mexico State	1	–	6	–	0	1	–	10	–	0
Cal State Fullerton	0	–	7	–	0	1	–	11	–	0
$ – Conference champion

The 1990 Fresno State Bulldogs football team represented California State University, Fresno as a member of the Big West Conference during the 1990 NCAA Division I-A football season. Led by 13th-year head coach Jim Sweeney, Fresno State compiled an overall record of 8–2–1 with a mark of 5–1–1 in conference play, tying for second place the Big West. The Bulldogs played their home games at Bulldog Stadium in Fresno, California.

== Schedule ==
Date	Opponent	Rank	Site	Result	Attendance	Source
September 1	Eastern Michigan*		Bulldog Stadium; Fresno, CA	W 41–10	32,188	
September 8	New Mexico*		Bulldog Stadium; Fresno, CA	W 24–17	34,097	
September 15	at Utah*		Robert Rice Stadium; Salt Lake City, UT	W 31–7	29,023	
September 22	New Mexico State		Bulldog Stadium; Fresno, CA	W 42–3	32,698	
September 29	Cal State Fullerton	No. 24	Bulldog Stadium; Fresno, CA	W 38–3	33,624	
October 6	at Northern Illinois*	No. 24	Huskie Stadium; DeKalb, IL	L 18–73	18,067	
October 13	Utah State		Bulldog Stadium; Fresno, CA	T 24–24	33,519	
October 20	Long Beach State		Bulldog Stadium; Fresno, CA	W 28–16	32,219	
November 3	at UNLV		Sam Boyd Silver Bowl; Whitney, NV	W 45–18	16,846	
November 10	Pacific (CA)		Bulldog Stadium; Fresno, CA	W 48–17	31,821	
November 17	at San Jose State		Spartan Stadium; San Jose, CA (rivalry)	L 7–42	31,218	
*Non-conference game; Rankings from AP Poll released prior to the game

== Team players in the NFL ==
The following were selected in the 1991 NFL draft.

Round	Pick	Player	Position	NFL team
3	60	Aaron Craver	Running back	Miami Dolphins

The following finished their college career in 1990, were not drafted, but played in the NFL.

Player	Position	First NFL team
Courtney Griffin	Defensive back	1993 Los Angeles Rams
