= 1990 BYU Cougars football team =

American college football season

1990 BYU Cougars football

WAC champion

Holiday Bowl, L 14–65 vs. Texas A&M
- Conference: Western Athletic Conference

Ranking
- Coaches: No. T–17
- AP: No. 22
- Record: 10–3 (7–1 WAC)
- Head coach: LaVell Edwards (19th season)
- Offensive coordinator: Roger French (10th season)
- Offensive scheme: West Coast
- Defensive coordinator: Dick Felt (16th season)
- Base defense: 4–3
- Home stadium: Cougar Stadium

1990 Western Athletic Conference football standings
	Conf.					Overall
Team	W		L		T	W		L		T
No. 22 BYU $	7	–	1	–	0	10	–	3	–	0
Colorado State	6	–	1	–	0	9	–	4	–	0
San Diego State	5	–	2	–	0	6	–	5	–	0
Wyoming	5	–	3	–	0	9	–	4	–	0
Hawaii	4	–	4	–	0	7	–	5	–	0
Air Force	3	–	4	–	0	7	–	5	–	0
Utah	2	–	6	–	0	4	–	7	–	0
New Mexico	1	–	6	–	0	2	–	10	–	0
UTEP	1	–	7	–	0	3	–	8	–	0
$ – Conference champion; Rankings from AP Poll

The 1990 BYU Cougars football team represented Brigham Young University (BYU) in the 1990 NCAA Division I-A football season. The Cougars offense scored 524 points while the defense allowed 350 points. Led by head coach LaVell Edwards, the team participated in the Holiday Bowl.

== Schedule ==
Date	Time	Opponent	Rank	Site	TV	Result	Attendance	Source
September 1	7:00 pm	at UTEP	No. 16	Sun Bowl; [El Paso, TX		W 30–10	29,033	
September 8	5:30 pm	No. 1 Miami (FL)*	No. 16	Cougar Stadium; Provo, UT	ESPN	W 28–21	66,235	
September 15	12:00 pm	Washington State*	No. 5	Cougar Stadium; Provo, UT		W 50–36	65,848	
September 22	1:30 pm	San Diego State	No. 4	Cougar Stadium; Provo, UT	CBS	W 62–34	66,044	
September 29	1:30 pm	at Oregon*	No. 4	Autzen Stadium; Eugene, OR	ABC	L 16–32	45,022	
October 13	12:00 pm	Colorado State	No. 11	Cougar Stadium; Provo, UT	KSL	W 52–9	65,922	
October 27	1:30 pm	New Mexico^{†}	No. 9	Cougar Stadium; Provo, UT		W 55–31	66,086	
November 3	12:00 pm	at Air Force	No. 10	Falcon Stadium; Colorado Springs, CO		W 54–7	26,513	
November 10	2:00 pm	at No. 25 Wyoming	No. 8	War Memorial Stadium; Laramie, WY	ESPN	W 45–14	34,231	
November 17	12:00 pm	at Utah	No. 5	Robert Rice Stadium; Salt Lake City, Utah		W 45–22	33,515	
November 24	7:00 pm	Utah State*	No. 4	Cougar Stadium; Provo, UT	KSL	W 45–10	65,876	
December 1	10:00 pm	at Hawaii	No. 4	Aloha Stadium; Halawa, HI		L 28–59	45,729	
December 29	5:30 pm	vs. Texas A&M*	No. 13	Jack Murphy Stadium; San Diego, CA (Holiday Bowl)	ESPN	L 14–65	61,441	
*Non-conference game; ^{†}Homecoming; Rankings from AP Poll released prior to the game

== Preseason ==
Ty Detmer was entering his third year as a starter and a Heisman Trophy candidate. Head coach LaVell Edwards considered him so valuable that he was allowed to go through spring practice untouched. While Detmer and tight Chris Smith were projected to lead another high-flying BYU offense, Edwards was looking for improvement with the team's defense that had been embarrassed in the Holiday Bowl by Penn State, which had led him to pay a visit to the San Francisco 49ers in the offseason. Even with their defensive deficiencies, BYU was considered a Top 20 squad and expected to once again to win the WAC.

== Game summaries ==
=== Game 1: UTEP ===
Quarter	1	2	3	4	Total
BYU	7	14	3	6	30
UTEP	7	3	0	0	10

at Cougar Stadium, Provo, Utah

- Date: September 1
- Box Score

Game information

2nd quarter

- UTEP: Gillespie 44-yard field goal

3rd quarter

- BYU: Kauffman 24-yard field goal

Passing

- BYU: Detmer 33/46, 387 yards, TD, 2 INT
- UTEP: Perez 17/34, 235 yards, INT

Rushing

- BYU: Tuipulotu 12–89, TD, Corley 10–44
- UTEP: Bogan 18–65

Receiving

- BYU: Smith 6–99, Bellini 6–70, Boyce 4–54
- UTEP: Barrett 8–165

=== Game 2: Miami (FL) ===
Quarter	1	2	3	4	Total
Miami (FL)	7	7	7	0	21
BYU	0	17	11	0	28

at Cougar Stadium, Provo, Utah

- Date: September 8
- Box Score

Game information

1st quarter

- MIA: McGuire 7-yard run (Huerta kick)

2nd quarter

- BYU: Bellini 14-yard pass from Detmer (Kaufman kick)
- BYU: Kaufman 32-yard field goal
- MIA: McGuire 2-yard run (Huerta kick)
- BYU: Boyce 2-yard pass from Detmer (Kaufman kick)

3rd quarter

- MIA: Conley 5-yard run (Huerta kick)
- BYU: Kaufman 29-yard field goal
- BYU: Salido 7-yard pass from Detmer (Detmer to Boyce pass)

4th quarter

- No scoring

Passing

- MIA: Erickson 25/52, 299 yards, INT
- BYU: Detmer 33/54, 406 yards, INT, Bellini 0/1

Rushing

- MIA: McGuire 18–63, Johnson 7–49, Erickson 7–20
- BYU: Tuipulotu 7–29, Salido 4–18, Detmer 11–7

Receiving

- MIA: Thomas 9–125, Carroll 8–59, Chudzinski 2–30
- BYU: Bellini 10–111, Boyce 9–96, Smith 7–90

=== Utah ===
Team	1	2	3	4	Total
• BYU	14	21	0	10	45
Utah	10	0	6	6	22

- Date: November 17
- Location: Robert Rice Stadium, Salt Lake City
- Game attendance: 33,515

Scoring summary
1	BYU	Corley 5-yard run (Kauffman kick)	BYU 7-0
1	UTAH	Lammle 31-yard field goal	BYU 7-3
1	UTAH	Rowley 56-yard pass from Richmond (Lammle kick)	UTAH 10-7
1	BYU	Matsuzaki 25-yard pass from Detmer (Kauffman kick)	BYU 14-10
2	BYU	Boyce 21-yard pass from Detmer (Kauffman kick)	BYU 21-10
2	BYU	Nyberg 55-yard pass from Detmer (Kauffman kick)	BYU 28-10
2	BYU	Smith 6-yard pass from Detmer (Kauffman kick)	BYU 35-10
3	UTAH	Lammle 40-yard field goal	BYU 35-13
3	UTAH	Lammle 21-yard field goal	BYU 35-16
4	BYU	Kauffman 33-yard field goal	BYU 38-16
4	BYU	Drage 4-yard pass from Detmer (Kauffman kick)	BYU 45-16
4	UTAH	Anglesey 4-yard pass from Richmond (run failed)	BYU 45-22

== Roster ==
1990 BYU Cougars football team roster
Players
Coaches
Offense

Pos.	#	Name	Class
C	57	John Ashman	So
G	70	Jim Balmforth	Sr
HB	8	Matt Bellini (C)	Sr
WR	17	Andy Boyce	Sr
OT	71	Scott Brumfield	Jr
FB	43	Scott Charlton	Jr
FB	31	Brad Clark	So
HB	21	Stacey Corley	Sr
QB	14	Ty Detmer (C)	Jr
WR	80	Eric Drage	Fr
WR	18	Mike Eckel	So
QB	7	Joe Evans	Jr
OT	76	Neal Fort	Sr
G	69	Jon Garber	So
C	63	Kent Griffith	Jr
OT	54	Kyle Harris	Jr
WR	84	Kirk Holle	Sr
G	79	Mike Jenkins	Jr
C	52	Bruce Jenne	Jr
WR	6	Drew Johnson	So
TE	85	Fotu Katoa	Sr
OT	61	Mike Keim	Sr
OT	75	Tom Ladd	Jr
WR	82	Micah Matsuzaki	So
OT	72	Brian May	Jr
HB	27	Eric Mortensen	Jr
WR	29	Brent Nyberg	Sr
OT	67	Garry Pay	So
TE	95	Byron Rex	So
FB	22	Mike Salido	Sr
HB	26	Jason Schmidt	So
QB	15	Brent Smith	So
TE	94	Chris Smith	Sr
RB	23	Eric Snyder	Jr
G	73	Kevin Souza	So
C	58	Robert Stephens	Sr
FB	32	Peter Tuipulotu	Jr
G	74	Garrett Tujague	Jr
WR	3	Nati Valdez	So
G	66	Scott VanWoerkom	Sr
OT	60	David Vimahi	Jr
TE	89	Matt Zundel	Jr

Defense

Pos.	#	Name	Class
DB	20	Josh Arnold	Jr
LB	45	Rocky Biegel	Jr
LB	46	Bill Bryant	So
DB	34	John Christensen	So
DL	92	Chris Conners	Jr
DB	1	Chris Connors	So
DB	24	Tony Crutchfield	Jr
NG	93	Stephen DeSantis	Jr
DB	2	Norm Dixon	Sr
LB	37	Alema Fitisemanu (C)	Sr
LB	47	Scott Giles	Jr
NG	90	Lenny Gomes	So
DB	5	Derwin Gray	So
DT	49	Eddie Green	Sr
LB	50	Shad Hansen	So
DB	38	Tau Harrington	Jr
DT	55	Pete Harston	Sr
DB	10	David Henderson	Jr
LB	33	Mike Hoggan	So
LB	48	Steve Holmes	So
DT	98	Brad Hunter	So
NG	97	Fred Katoa	Sr
DT	59	Rich Kaufusi	Sr
DB	28	David Kinard	Jr
LB	56	Jared Leavitt	Jr
DB	9	Ervin Lee	Jr
LB	41	Drayton Martin	Fr
DB	30	Brian Mitchell (C)	Sr
DT	96	Scott Moberly	So
LB	44	Kevin Nicoll	Jr
DT	99	Greg Pitts	Fr
LB	39	Dave Porter	Jr
LB	42	Joe Richardson	Jr
DB	11	Kyle Roberts	So
DB	25	Kapi Sikahema	Jr
LB	53	Randy Slayton	Jr
NG	91	Mark Smith	Sr
DL	87	Doug Stone	So
NG	77	Rick Wilson	Sr

Special teams

Pos.	#	Name	Class
K/P	86	Earl Kauffman	Jr
K	19	Keith Lever	Jr
P	13	Robert Stark	Sr

Head coach

- LaVell Edwards

Coordinators/assistant coaches

- Robert Anae – Graduate assistant
- Claude Bassett – Inside linebackers
- Robbie Bosco – Quarterbacks
- Norm Chow – Co-offensive coordinator/wide receivers
- Dick Felt – Assistant head coach/defensive coordinator
- Roger French – Offensive coordinator/offensive line
- Chris Pella – Kickers
- Tom Ramage – Defensive line
- Lance Reynolds – Running backs
- Ken Schmidt – Linebackers

Legend

- (C) Team captain
- (S) Suspended
- (I) Ineligible
- Injured
- Redshirt

Roster
Last update: 2011-01-02

== Statistics ==
=== Passing ===
Player	G/GS	Comp	Att	Yards	TD	INT
Ty Detmer	12/12	361	562	5,188	41	28
Joe Evans	5/0	11	16	148	0	1
Matt Bellini	11/9	1	2	43	0	0

== Awards and honors ==
- Heisman Trophy: Ty Detmer
- Maxwell Award: Ty Demter
- Davey O'Brien Award: Ty Detmer

Runner Up WAC Defensive Player of the Year: Alema Fitisemanu

- All-WAC: (1st) Alema Fitisemanu, Matt Bellini, Andy Boyce, Ty Detmer, Neal Fort, Earl Kauffman (P), Rich Kaufusi, Brian Mitchell, Robert Stephens, (2nd) Mike Keim, Rocky Biegel, Tony Crutchfield

East West Shrine All Star Game: Alema Fiitsemanu, Rich Kaufusi, Chris Smith, Andy Boyce

== Team players in the NFL ==
The following were selected in the 1991 NFL draft.

Player	Position	Round	Overall	NFL team
Neal Fort	Tackle	6	143	Los Angeles Rams
Brian Mitchell	Defensive back	7	172	Atlanta Falcons
Chris Smith	Tight end	11	295	Cincinnati Bengals
