= 1990 New Mexico State Aggies football team =

American college football season

1990 New Mexico State Aggies football
- Conference: Big West Conference
- Record: 1–10 (1–6 Big West)
- Head coach: Jim Hess (1st season)
- Offensive coordinator: Howard Wells (1st season)
- Defensive coordinator: Gary DeLoach (1st season)
- Home stadium: Aggie Memorial Stadium

1990 Big West Conference football standings
	Conf.					Overall
Team	W		L		T	W		L		T
San Jose State $	7	–	0	–	0	9	–	2	–	1
Fresno State	5	–	1	–	1	8	–	2	–	1
Utah State	5	–	1	–	1	5	–	5	–	1
Long Beach State	4	–	3	–	0	6	–	5	–	0
UNLV	3	–	4	–	0	4	–	7	–	0
Pacific (CA)	2	–	5	–	0	4	–	7	–	0
New Mexico State	1	–	6	–	0	1	–	10	–	0
Cal State Fullerton	0	–	7	–	0	1	–	11	–	0
$ – Conference champion

The 1990 New Mexico State Aggies football team represented New Mexico State University in the 1990 NCAA Division I-A football season as a member of the Big West Conference. The Aggies were coached by head coach Jim Hess and played their home games at Aggie Memorial Stadium in Las Cruces, New Mexico.

== Schedule ==
Date	Opponent	Site	Result	Attendance	Source
September 1	New Mexico*	Aggie Memorial Stadium; Las Cruces, NM (rivalry)	L 12–29	24,138	
September 8	at UTEP*	Sun Bowl; El Paso, TX (rivalry)	L 24–27	28,930	
September 15	at Kansas State*	KSU Stadium; Manhattan, KS	L 7–52	19,200	
September 22	at Fresno State	Bulldog Stadium; Fresno, CA	L 3–42	32,698	
October 6	at Long Beach State	Veterans Memorial Stadium; Long Beach, CA	L 27–31	3,925	
October 13	UNLV	Aggie Memorial Stadium; Las Cruces, NM	L 20–24	10,267	
October 20	at Pacific (CA)	Stagg Memorial Stadium; Stockton, CA	L 24–62	6,000	
October 27	Tulsa*	Aggie Memorial Stadium; Las Cruces, NM	L 10–35	17,972	
November 3	at Utah State	Romney Stadium; Logan, UT	L 10–55	9,970	
November 10	San Jose State	Aggie Memorial Stadium; Las Cruces, NM	L 20–56	13,865	
November 17	Cal State Fullerton	Aggie Memorial Stadium; Las Cruces, NM	W 43–9	19,227	
*Non-conference game; Source:
