= 1990 Copper Bowl =

- 2nd Copper Bowl
Wyoming Cowboys	California Golden Bears
(9–3)	(6–4–1)
WAC	Pac-10
15	17
Head coach: Paul Roach	Head coach: Bruce Snyder
	1	2	3	4	Total
Wyoming	0	3	0	12	15
California	0	7	3	7	17
- Date: December 31, 1990
- Season: 1990
- Stadium: Arizona Stadium
- Location: Tucson, Arizona
- MVP: Mike Pawlawski (QB, Cal) & Robert Midgett (LB, Wyoming)
- Referee: C.C. Dailey (ACC)
- Attendance: 36,340

United States TV coverage
- Network: TBS
- Announcers: Bob Neal and Tim Foley

The 1990 Copper Bowl featured the Wyoming Cowboys and the California Golden Bears.

After a scoreless first quarter, Cal quarterback Mike Pawlawski threw a 25-yard touchdown pass to Brian Treggs giving Cal a 7–0 lead. A 26-yard Wyoming field goal cut the margin to 7–3 at halftime. In the third quarter, Cal added a 46-yard field goal to take a 10–3 lead. In the fourth quarter, Eric Zomalt scored on a 4-yard touchdown run increasing Cal's lead to 17–3. Wyoming scored on an 11-yard Daffer run, and attempted a 2-point conversion that failed, to make the score 17–9. They later scored on a 70-yard punt return, but the 2-point conversion attempt again failed, leaving the final score 17–15.

== Statistics ==
Statistics	Wyoming	California
First downs	18	14
Rushes-yards	32-129	46-89
Passing yards	226	172
Passes, Comp-Att-Int	20-39-2	15-26-1
Return yards	68	32
Punts-average	8-36	9-42
Fumbles-lost	2-0	3-0
Penalties-yards	1-5	8-57
Time of Possession	29:48	30:12
Attendance	36,340	
