= 1990 Pacific Tigers football team =

American college football season

1990 Pacific Tigers football
- Conference: Big West Conference
- Record: 4–7 (2–5 Big West)
- Head coach: Walt Harris (2nd season)
- Offensive coordinator: John Shannon (2nd season)
- Offensive scheme: Run and shoot
- Defensive coordinator: John Neal (1st season)
- Base defense: 4–3
- Home stadium: Stagg Memorial Stadium

1990 Big West Conference football standings
	Conf.					Overall
Team	W		L		T	W		L		T
San Jose State $	7	–	0	–	0	9	–	2	–	1
Fresno State	5	–	1	–	1	8	–	2	–	1
Utah State	5	–	1	–	1	5	–	5	–	1
Long Beach State	4	–	3	–	0	6	–	5	–	0
UNLV	3	–	4	–	0	4	–	7	–	0
Pacific (CA)	2	–	5	–	0	4	–	7	–	0
New Mexico State	1	–	6	–	0	1	–	10	–	0
Cal State Fullerton	0	–	7	–	0	1	–	11	–	0
$ – Conference champion

The 1990 Pacific Tigers football team represented the University of the Pacific (UOP) in the 1990 NCAA Division I-A football season as a member of the Big West Conference.

The team was led by head coach Walt Harris, in his second year, and played their home games at Stagg Memorial Stadium in Stockton, California. They finished the season with a record of four wins and seven losses (4–7, 2–5 Big West). The Tigers averaged over 30 points per game in 1990, but gave up almost 40 point per game. They were outscored by their opponents 353–411 over the season.

== Schedule ==
Date	Opponent	Site	Result	Attendance	Source
September 1	at No. 8 Tennessee*	Neyland Stadium; Knoxville, TN	L 7–55	94,467	
September 8	Sacramento State*	Stagg Memorial Stadium; Stockton, CA	W 41–33	8,013	
September 15	San Jose State	Stagg Memorial Stadium; Stockton, CA (Victory Bell)	L 14–28	8,645	
September 22	at Long Beach State	Veterans Stadium; Long Beach, CA	L 7–28	5,366	
September 29	UNLV	Stagg Memorial Stadium; Stockton, CA	L 28–37	6,376	
October 13	at Cal State Fullerton	Santa Ana Stadium; Santa Ana, CA	W 67–37	2,013	
October 20	New Mexico State	Stagg Memorial Stadium; Stockton, CA	W 62–24	6,000	
October 27	at Hawaii*	Aloha Stadium; Halawa, HI	L 24–35	39,941	
November 3	Portland State*^{†}	Stagg Memorial Stadium; Stockton, CA	W 41–35	12,000	
November 10	at Fresno State	Bulldog Stadium; Fresno, CA	L 17–48	31,821	
November 17	at Utah State	Romney Stadium; Logan, UT	L 45–51	14,905	
*Non-conference game; ^{†}Homecoming; Rankings from AP Poll released prior to the game
