= 1990 Utah Utes football team =

American college football season

1990 Utah Utes football
- Conference: Western Athletic Conference
- Record: 4–7 (2–6 WAC)
- Head coach: Ron McBride (1st season)
- Offensive coordinator: Danny Henson (1st season)
- Offensive scheme: Multiple
- Defensive coordinator: Greg McMackin (1st season)
- Base defense: 4–3
- Home stadium: Robert Rice Stadium

1990 Western Athletic Conference football standings
	Conf.					Overall
Team	W		L		T	W		L		T
No. 22 BYU $	7	–	1	–	0	10	–	3	–	0
Colorado State	6	–	1	–	0	9	–	4	–	0
San Diego State	5	–	2	–	0	6	–	5	–	0
Wyoming	5	–	3	–	0	9	–	4	–	0
Hawaii	4	–	4	–	0	7	–	5	–	0
Air Force	3	–	4	–	0	7	–	5	–	0
Utah	2	–	6	–	0	4	–	7	–	0
New Mexico	1	–	6	–	0	2	–	10	–	0
UTEP	1	–	7	–	0	3	–	8	–	0
$ – Conference champion; Rankings from AP Poll

The 1990 Utah Utes football team represented the University of Utah as a member of the Western Athletic Conference (WAC) during the 1990 NCAA Division I-A football season. In their first season under head coach Ron McBride, the Utes compiled an overall record of 4–7 record with a mark of 2–6 against conference opponents, placed seventh in the WAC, and were outscored by their opponents 348 to 214. The team played home games at Robert Rice Stadium in Salt Lake City.

The McBride era started with a shutout of Utah State. It was the Utes first shutout since the 1981 season and signaled a change in defensive philosophy from the previous year, in which Utah finished in last place out of 106 NCAA Division I-A teams in total defense.

== Schedule ==
Date	Time	Opponent	Site	TV	Result	Attendance	Source
September 1	1:15 pm	at Utah State*	Romney Stadium; Logan, UT (Battle of the Brothers)	KTVX	W 19–0	19,631	
September 8	6:00 pm	at Minnesota*	Hubert H. Humphrey Metrodome; Minneapolis, MN	KUTV	W 35–29	32,229	
September 15	7:00 pm	No. 23 Fresno State*	Robert Rice Stadium; Salt Lake City, UT		L 7–31	29,023	
September 22	7:00 pm	Hawaii	Robert Rice Stadium; Salt Lake City, UT		L 7–19	29,140	
September 29	12:00 pm	Wyoming	Robert Rice Stadium; Salt Lake City, UT		L 10–28	31,051	
October 6	12:05 pm	at Colorado State	Hughes Stadium; Fort Collins, CO		L 13–28	23,107	
October 20	12:00 pm	UTEP^{†}	Robert Rice Stadium; Salt Lake City, UT		W 37–23	26,262	
October 27	12:05 pm	at Air Force	Falcon Stadium; Colorado Springs, CO		L 21–52	40,798	
November 3	6:00 pm	at San Diego State	Jack Murphy Stadium; San Diego, CA		L 14–66	25,504	
November 10	12:05 pm	at New Mexico	University Stadium; Albuquerque, NM		W 29–27	10,431	
November 17	12:00 pm	No. 5 BYU	Robert Rice Stadium; Salt Lake City, UT (Holy War)	KUTV	L 22–45	33,515	
*Non-conference game; ^{†}Homecoming; Rankings from AP Poll released prior to the game; All times are in Mountain time
