= 1990 San Diego State Aztecs football team =

American college football season

1990 San Diego State Aztecs football
- Conference: Western Athletic Conference
- Record: 6–5 (5–2 WAC)
- Head coach: Al Luginbill (2nd season)
- Offensive coordinator: Dave Lay (2nd season)
- Offensive scheme: Single set back
- Defensive coordinator: Barry Lamb (2nd season)
- Base defense: 4–3
- Home stadium: Jack Murphy Stadium

1990 Western Athletic Conference football standings
| | Conf. | | | | | Overall |
| Team | W | | L | | T | W | | L | | T |
|---|---|---|---|---|---|---|---|---|---|---|
| No. 22 BYU $ | 7 | – | 1 | – | 0 | 10 | – | 3 | – | 0 |
| Colorado State | 6 | – | 1 | – | 0 | 9 | – | 4 | – | 0 |
| San Diego State | 5 | – | 2 | – | 0 | 6 | – | 5 | – | 0 |
| Wyoming | 5 | – | 3 | – | 0 | 9 | – | 4 | – | 0 |
| Hawaii | 4 | – | 4 | – | 0 | 7 | – | 5 | – | 0 |
| Air Force | 3 | – | 4 | – | 0 | 7 | – | 5 | – | 0 |
| Utah | 2 | – | 6 | – | 0 | 4 | – | 7 | – | 0 |
| New Mexico | 1 | – | 6 | – | 0 | 2 | – | 10 | – | 0 |
| UTEP | 1 | – | 7 | – | 0 | 3 | – | 8 | – | 0 |
$ – Conference champion; Rankings from AP Poll

The 1990 San Diego State Aztecs football team represented San Diego State University as a member of the Western Athletic Conference (WAC) during the 1990 NCAA Division I-A football season. Led by second-year head coach Al Luginbill, the Aztecs compiled an overall record of 6–5 with a mark of 5–2 conference play, placing third in the WAC. The team played home games at Jack Murphy Stadium in San Diego.

== Schedule ==
| Date | Opponent | Site | Result | Attendance | Source |
|---|---|---|---|---|---|
| September 8 | at Oregon* | Autzen Stadium; Eugene, OR | L 21–42 | 35,118 | |
| September 15 | Long Beach State* | Jack Murphy Stadium; San Diego, CA | W 38–20 | 19,170 | |
| September 22 | at No. 4 BYU | Cougar Stadium; Provo, UT | L 34–62 | 66,044 | |
| September 29 | Air Force | Jack Murphy Stadium; San Diego, CA | W 48–18 | 19,104 | |
| October 6 | at Wyoming | War Memorial Stadium; Laramie, WY | L 51–52 | 16,713 | |
| October 13 | at UCLA* | Rose Bowl; Pasadena, CA | L 31–45 | 41,025 | |
| November 3 | Utah^{†} | Jack Murphy Stadium; San Diego, CA | W 66–14 | 25,504 | |
| November 10 | Hawaii | Jack Murphy Stadium; San Diego, CA | W 44–38 | 20,450 | |
| November 17 | at New Mexico | University Stadium; Albuquerque, NM | W 40–34 | 7,868 | |
| November 24 | UTEP | Jack Murphy Stadium; San Diego, CA | W 53–31 | 13,927 | |
| December 1 | No. 2 Miami (FL)* | Jack Murphy Stadium; San Diego, CA | L 28–30 | 34,201 | |
*Non-conference game; ^{†}Homecoming; Rankings from AP Poll released prior to the game

== Team players in the NFL ==
The following were selected in the 1991 NFL draft.

| Player | Position | Round | Overall | NFL team |
|---|---|---|---|---|
| Dan McGwire | Quarterback | 1 | 16 | Seattle Seahawks |
| Pio Sagapolutele | Defensive tackle – Defensive end | 4 | 85 | Cleveland Browns |
| Nick Subis | Tackle – Center | 6 | 142 | Denver Broncos |

The following finished their college career in 1990, were not drafted, but played in the NFL.

| Player | Position | First NFL team |
|---|---|---|
| Brad Daluiso | Kicker | 1991 Buffalo Bills |
| Jimmy Raye | Wide receiver | 1991 Los Angeles Rams |

== Team awards ==
| Award | Player |
|---|---|
| Most Valuable Player (John Simcox Memorial Trophy) | Dan McGwire |
| Outstanding Offensive & Defensive Linemen (Byron H. Chase Memorial Trophy) | Nick Subis, Off; Pio Sagapolutele, Def |
| Team captains Dr. R. Hardy / C.E. Peterson Memorial Trophy | Dan McGwire, Off; Lou Foster, Def; Andy Trakas, Special Teams |
| Most Inspirational Player | Lou Foster |
