= 1990 UTEP Miners football team =

American college football season

1990 UTEP Miners football
- Conference: Western Athletic Conference
- Record: 3–8 (1–7 WAC)
- Head coach: David Lee (2nd season)
- Offensive coordinator: David Culley (2nd season)
- Defensive coordinator: Charlie Bailey (1st season)
- Home stadium: Sun Bowl

1990 Western Athletic Conference football standings
	Conf.					Overall
Team	W		L		T	W		L		T
No. 22 BYU $	7	–	1	–	0	10	–	3	–	0
Colorado State	6	–	1	–	0	9	–	4	–	0
San Diego State	5	–	2	–	0	6	–	5	–	0
Wyoming	5	–	3	–	0	9	–	4	–	0
Hawaii	4	–	4	–	0	7	–	5	–	0
Air Force	3	–	4	–	0	7	–	5	–	0
Utah	2	–	6	–	0	4	–	7	–	0
New Mexico	1	–	6	–	0	2	–	10	–	0
UTEP	1	–	7	–	0	3	–	8	–	0
$ – Conference champion; Rankings from AP Poll

The 1990 UTEP Miners football team was an American football team that represented the University of Texas at El Paso in the Western Athletic Conference during the 1990 NCAA Division I-A football season. In their second year under head coach David Lee, the team compiled a 3–8 record.

== Schedule ==
Date	Opponent	Site	Result	Attendance	Source
September 1	No. 16 BYU	Sun Bowl; El Paso, TX	L 10–30	29,033	
September 8	New Mexico State*	Sun Bowl; El Paso, TX (rivalry)	W 27–24	28,930	
September 15	at No. 7 Tennessee*	Neyland Stadium; Knoxville, TN	L 0–56	95,203	
September 22	at Colorado State	Hughes Stadium; Fort Collins, CO	L 20–38	26,541	
September 29	Sam Houston State*	Sun Bowl; El Paso, TX	W 17–10	21,801	
October 6	at New Mexico	University Stadium; Albuquerque, NM	L 28–48	17,932	
October 13	Hawaii^{†}	Sun Bowl; El Paso, TX	W 12–10	16,121	
October 20	at Utah	Robert Rice Stadium; Salt Lake City, UT	L 23–37	26,262	
October 27	No. 18 Wyoming	Sun Bowl; El Paso, TX	L 10–17	16,694	
November 17	Air Force	Sun Bowl; El Paso, TX	L 13–14	32,666	
November 24	at San Diego State	Jack Murphy Stadium; San Diego, CA	L 31–58	13,927	
*Non-conference game; ^{†}Homecoming; Rankings from AP Poll released prior to the game
