= 1990 San Jose State Spartans football team =

American college football season

1990 San Jose State Spartans football

Big West champion California Bowl champion

California Bowl, W 48–24 vs. Central Michigan
- Conference: Big West Conference

Ranking
- Coaches: No. 20
- Record: 9–2–1 (7–0 Big West)
- Head coach: Terry Shea (1st season)
- Offensive coordinator: Rick Rasnick (4th season)
- Home stadium: Spartan Stadium

1990 Big West Conference football standings
	Conf.					Overall
Team	W		L		T	W		L		T
San Jose State $	7	–	0	–	0	9	–	2	–	1
Fresno State	5	–	1	–	1	8	–	2	–	1
Utah State	5	–	1	–	1	5	–	5	–	1
Long Beach State	4	–	3	–	0	6	–	5	–	0
UNLV	3	–	4	–	0	4	–	7	–	0
Pacific (CA)	2	–	5	–	0	4	–	7	–	0
New Mexico State	1	–	6	–	0	1	–	10	–	0
Cal State Fullerton	0	–	7	–	0	1	–	11	–	0
$ – Conference champion

The 1990 San Jose State Spartans football team represented San Jose State University during the 1990 NCAA Division I-A football season as a member of the Big West Conference. The team was led by head coach Terry Shea, in his first year as head coach at San Jose State. They played home games at Spartan Stadium in San Jose, California. The Spartans finished the 1990 season as Champions of the Big West conference, with a record of nine wins, two losses and one tie (7–0 Big West). They were a mere 4 points away in their 2 losses to opponents from having an undefeated season. They have been dubbed “The Greatest Team in SJSU Football History” by the media in 2023.

As a result of the Big West championship, the Spartans qualified for a postseason bowl game against the Mid-American Conference (MAC) co-champion Central Michigan Chippewas. The 1990 California Bowl was played in Fresno, California on December 8, with San Jose State winning, 48–24.

== Schedule ==
Date	Opponent	Site	Result	Attendance	Source
September 1	Louisville*	Spartan Stadium; San Jose, CA	T 10–10	16,281	
September 8	at No. 20 Washington*	Husky Stadium; Seattle, WA	L 17–20	66,337	
September 15	at Pacific (CA)	Stagg Memorial Stadium; Stockton, CA (Victory Bell)	W 28–14	8,645	
September 22	at UNLV	Sam Boyd Silver Bowl; Whitney, NV	W 47–13	18,934	
September 29	at Stanford*	Stanford Stadium; Stanford, CA (rivalry)	W 29–23	45,500	
October 6	at California*	California Memorial Stadium; Berkeley, CA	L 34–35	35,000	
October 13	Long Beach State^{†}	Spartan Stadium; San Jose, CA	W 46–29	14,938	
October 20	Utah State	Spartan Stadium; San Jose, CA	W 34–27	11,834	
November 3	Cal State Fullerton	Spartan Stadium; San Jose, CA	W 44–6	11,256	
November 10	at New Mexico State	Aggie Memorial Stadium; Las Cruces, NM	W 56–20	13,865	
November 17	Fresno State	Spartan Stadium; San Jose, CA (rivalry)	W 42–7	31,218	
December 8	vs. Central Michigan*	Bulldog Stadium; Fresno, CA (California Bowl)	W 48–24	25,431	
*Non-conference game; ^{†}Homecoming; Rankings from AP Poll released prior to the game

== Rankings ==
Ranking movements Legend: ██ Increase in ranking ██ Decrease in ranking — = Not ranked
	Week																
Poll	Pre	1	2	3	4	5	6	7	8	9	10	11	12	13	14	15	Final
AP	—	—	—	—	—	—	—	—	—	—	—	—	—	—	—	—	—
Coaches	—		—	—	—	—	—	—	—	—	—	—	—	23	25	25	20

== Team players in the NFL ==
The following were selected in the 1991 NFL draft.

Player	Position	Round	Overall	NFL team
Sheldon Canley	Running back	7	193	San Francisco 49ers
