= Anthoney Hill =

American gridiron football player (born 1971)

Colorado Mesa Mavericks
- Title: Running backs coach & tight ends coach

Personal information
- Born: December 24, 1971 (age 54); San Diego, California, U.S.

Career information
- Position: Quarterback (No. 11)
- High school: University City (University City, San Diego)
- College: Colorado State (1991–1994)
- NFL draft: 1995: undrafted

Career history

Playing
- Edmonton Eskimos (1995)

Coaching
- Colorado State (1998) Student assistant; La Jolla HS (CA) (1999–2002) Offensive coordinator; Southwestern CC (2003–2004) Offensive coordinator & tight ends coach; La Jolla HS (CA) (2005–2006) Offensive coordinator; San Diego HS (CA) (2007) Head coach; Colorado State (2008–2011) Running backs coach; Colorado Ice (2012) Assistant offensive coordinator & quarterbacks coach; McPherson (2013–2014) Passing game coordinator & wide receivers coach; Colorado State (2015–2021) Director of player development; Colorado Mesa (2022–present) Running backs coach & tight ends coach

Anthoney Hill (born December 24, 1971) is an American football coach and former quarterback. He is the running backs and tight ends coach for Colorado Mesa University, a position he has held since 2022. He played college football for the Colorado State Rams. He was the Director of Player Development & Community/Alumni Relations for Colorado State.
