= 1990 UNLV Rebels football team =

American college football season

1990 UNLV Rebels football
- Conference: Big West Conference
- Record: 4–7 (3–4 Big West)
- Head coach: Jim Strong (1st season)
- Home stadium: Sam Boyd Silver Bowl

1990 Big West Conference football standings
	Conf.					Overall
Team	W		L		T	W		L		T
San Jose State $	7	–	0	–	0	9	–	2	–	1
Fresno State	5	–	1	–	1	8	–	2	–	1
Utah State	5	–	1	–	1	5	–	5	–	1
Long Beach State	4	–	3	–	0	6	–	5	–	0
UNLV	3	–	4	–	0	4	–	7	–	0
Pacific (CA)	2	–	5	–	0	4	–	7	–	0
New Mexico State	1	–	6	–	0	1	–	10	–	0
Cal State Fullerton	0	–	7	–	0	1	–	11	–	0
$ – Conference champion

The 1990 UNLV Rebels football team was an American football team that represented the University of Nevada, Las Vegas (UNLV) as a member of the Big West Conference during the 1990 NCAA Division I-A football season. In their first year under head coach Jim Strong, the Rebels compiled an overall record of 4–7 with a mark of 3–4 in conference play, placing fifth in the Big West. The team played home games at the Sam Boyd Silver Bowl in Whitney, Nevada.

== Schedule ==
Date	Opponent	Site	Result	Attendance	Source
September 1	Southwest Missouri State*	Sam Boyd Silver Bowl; Whitney, NV	L 24–31	17,659	
September 8	at No. 24 Houston*	Houston Astrodome; Houston, TX	L 9–37	20,138	
September 15	at Oregon State*	Parker Stadium; Corvallis, OR	W 45–20	17,272	
September 22	San Jose State	Sam Boyd Silver Bowl; Whitney, NV	L 13–47	18,934	
September 29	at Pacific (CA)	Pacific Memorial Stadium; Stockton, CA	W 37–28	6,376	
October 6	Cal State Fullerton	Sam Boyd Silver Bowl; Whitney, NV	W 29–10	17,526	
October 13	at New Mexico State	Aggie Memorial Stadium; Las Cruces, NM	W 24–20	10,267	
October 20	Nevada*	Sam Boyd Silver Bowl; Whitney, NV (Fremont Cannon)	L 14–26	22,402	
October 27	at Utah State	Romney Stadium; Logan, UT	L 6–31	15,273	
November 3	Fresno State	Sam Boyd Silver Bowl; Whitney, NV	L 18–45	16,846	
November 17	at Long Beach State	Veterans Memorial Stadium; Long Beach, CA	L 20–29	4,649	
*Non-conference game; Rankings from Coaches' Poll released prior to the game
