= List of Miami Hurricanes bowl games =

The Miami Hurricanes football program has played in 46 bowl games since its founding, recording a total record of 22–25 for a .442 winning percentage as of 2025. The University of Miami's most common bowl destination has been the Orange Bowl, where the Hurricanes have appeared nine times and compiled a 6–3 record. Miami's most common opponent in bowl play has been Nebraska; the schools have met six times in bowl play with the Hurricanes recording a 4–2 record against the Cornhuskers. Miami's second-most common opponent in bowl play has been Wisconsin; the schools have met three times in bowl games with the Badgers winning all three bowl games to date.

Date	Bowl	W/L	Opponent	PF	PA
January 1, 1935	Orange Bowl	L	Bucknell	0	26
January 1, 1946	Orange Bowl	W	Holy Cross	13	6
January 1, 1951	Orange Bowl	L	Clemson	14	15
January 1, 1952	Gator Bowl	W	Clemson	14	0
December 16, 1961	Liberty Bowl	L	Syracuse	14	15
December 15, 1962	Gotham Bowl	L	Nebraska	34	36
December 10, 1966	Liberty Bowl	W	Virginia Tech	14	7
December 23, 1967	Bluebonnet Bowl	L	Colorado	21	31
January 2, 1981	Peach Bowl	W	Virginia Tech	20	10
January 2, 1984	Orange Bowl	W	Nebraska	31	30
January 1, 1985	Fiesta Bowl	L	UCLA	37	39
January 1, 1986	Sugar Bowl	L	Tennessee	7	35
January 2, 1987	Fiesta Bowl	L	Penn State	10	14
January 1, 1988	Orange Bowl	W	Oklahoma	20	14
January 2, 1989	Orange Bowl	W	Nebraska	23	3
January 1, 1990	Sugar Bowl	W	Alabama	33	25
January 1, 1991	Cotton Bowl Classic	W	Texas	46	3
January 1, 1992	Orange Bowl	W	Nebraska	22	0
January 1, 1993	Sugar Bowl; Bowl Coalition National Championship	L	Alabama	13	34
January 1, 1994	Fiesta Bowl	L	Arizona	0	29
January 1, 1995	Orange Bowl; Bowl Coalition National Championship	L	Nebraska	17	24
December 27, 1996	Carquest Bowl	W	Virginia	31	21
December 29, 1998	MicronPC Bowl	W	NC State	46	23
January 1, 2000	Gator Bowl	W	Georgia Tech	28	13
January 2, 2001	Sugar Bowl	W	Florida	37	20
January 3, 2002	Rose Bowl; BCS National Championship	W	Nebraska	37	14
January 3, 2003	Fiesta Bowl; BCS National Championship	L (2OT)	Ohio State	24	31
January 1, 2004	Orange Bowl	W	Florida State	16	14
December 31, 2004	Peach Bowl	W	Florida	27	10
December 30, 2005	Peach Bowl	L	LSU	3	40
December 31, 2006	MPC Computers Bowl	W	Nevada	21	20
December 27, 2008	Emerald Bowl	L	California	17	24
December 29, 2009	Champs Sports Bowl	L	Wisconsin	14	20
December 31, 2010	Sun Bowl	L	Notre Dame	17	33
December 28, 2013	Russell Athletic Bowl	L	Louisville	9	36
December 27, 2014	Independence Bowl	L	South Carolina	21	24
December 26, 2015	Sun Bowl	L	Washington State	14	20
December 28, 2016	Russell Athletic Bowl	W	West Virginia	31	14
December 30, 2017	Orange Bowl	L	Wisconsin	24	34
December 27, 2018	Pinstripe Bowl	L	Wisconsin	3	35
December 26, 2019	Independence Bowl	L	Louisiana Tech	0	14
December 29, 2020	Cheez-It Bowl	L	Oklahoma State	34	37
December 28, 2023	Pinstripe Bowl	L	Rutgers	24	31
December 28, 2024	Pop-Tarts Bowl	L	Iowa State	41	42
December 20, 2025	CFP First Round	W	Texas A&M	10	3
December 31, 2025	Cotton Bowl Classic (CPF Quarterfinals)	W	Ohio State	24	14
January 8, 2026	Fiesta Bowl (CPF Semifinals)	W	Ole Miss	31	27
January 19, 2026	CFP National Championship	L	Indiana	21	27
Total	48 bowl games	22–26		961	951
