= 1995 Miami Hurricanes football team =

American college football season

1995 Miami Hurricanes football

Big East co-champion
- Conference: Big East Conference

Ranking
- AP: No. 20
- Record: 8–3 (6–1 Big East)
- Head coach: Butch Davis (1st season)
- Offensive coordinator: Larry Coker (1st season)
- Defensive coordinator: Bill Miller (1st season)
- MVP: Ray Lewis
- Home stadium: Miami Orange Bowl

1995 Big East Conference football standings
	Conf.			Overall
Team	W		L	W		L
No. 10 Virginia Tech +	6	–	1	10	–	2
No. 20 Miami (FL) +	6	–	1	8	–	3
No. 19 Syracuse	5	–	2	9	–	3
West Virginia	4	–	3	5	–	6
Boston College	4	–	3	4	–	8
Rutgers	2	–	5	4	–	7
Temple	1	–	6	1	–	10
Pittsburgh	0	–	7	2	–	9
+ – Conference co-champions; Rankings from AP Poll

The 1995 Miami Hurricanes football team represented the University of Miami during the 1995 NCAA Division I-A football season. It was the Hurricanes' 70th season of football and fifth as a member of the Big East Conference. The Hurricanes were led by first-year head coach Butch Davis and played their home games at the Orange Bowl. They finished the season 8–3 overall and 6–1 in the Big East to finish as conference co-champion. They served a one-year bowl ban due to NCAA sanctions that were levied at the end of the season.

== Schedule ==
Date	Time	Opponent	Rank	Site	TV	Result	Attendance	Source
September 2	8:00 pm	at No. 15 UCLA*	No. 12	Rose Bowl; Pasadena, CA	ABC	L 8–31	60,091	
September 9	4:00 pm	No. 25 (I-AA) Florida A&M*	No. 19	Miami Orange Bowl; Miami, FL		W 49–3	57,721	
September 23	12:00 pm	at Virginia Tech	No. 17	Lane Stadium; Blacksburg, VA (rivalry)	BEN	L 7–13	51,206	
October 7	7:30 pm	at No. 1 Florida State*		Doak Campbell Stadium; Tallahassee, FL (rivalry, College GameDay)	ESPN	L 17–41	80,350	
October 14	7:30 pm	Rutgers		Miami Orange Bowl; Miami, FL	BEN	W 56–21	19,747	
October 21	12:00 pm	at Pittsburgh		Pitt Stadium; Pittsburgh, PA	BEN	W 17–16	28,794	
October 28	4:00 pm	Temple^{†}		Miami Orange Bowl; Miami, FL		W 36–12	28,147	
November 4	12:00 pm	Baylor*		Miami Orange Bowl; Miami, FL	ESPN2	W 35–14	32,655	
November 11	12:00 pm	at Boston College		Alumni Stadium; Chestnut Hill, MA	BEN	W 17–14	44,500	
November 18	4:00 pm	West Virginia	No. 25	Miami Orange Bowl; Miami, FL		W 17–12	43,409	
November 25	7:30 pm	No. 22 Syracuse	No. 25	Miami Orange Bowl; Miami, FL	ESPN	W 35–24	47,544	
*Non-conference game; ^{†}Homecoming; Rankings from AP Poll released prior to the game; All times are in Eastern time

== Game summaries ==
=== UCLA ===
#12 Miami Hurricanes at #15 UCLA Bruins

Quarter	1	2	3	4	Total
Miami (FL)	0	0	0	8	8
UCLA	3	0	14	14	31

at Rose Bowl, Pasadena, California

- Date: September 2, 1995
- Game attendance: 60,091
- Box score

Game information
First quarter
- UCLA - B. Merten 24-yard field goal

Second quarter

- No scoring

Third quarter

- UCLA - A. McCullough recovered fumble in end zone (B. Merten kick)
- UCLA - K. Abdul-Jabbar 9-yard run (B. Merten kick)

Fourth quarter

- UCLA - K. Abdul-Jabbar 6-yard run (B. Merten kick)
- UM - S. Tucker 10-yard pass from R. Collins (J. German pass conversion)
- UCLA - J. Milliner 1-yard run (B. Merten kick)

=== Florida A&M ===
Florida A&M Rattlers at #19 Miami Hurricanes

Quarter	1	2	3	4	Total
Florida A&M	7	7	0	7	21
Miami (FL)	14	35	0	7	56

at Orange Bowl, Miami, Florida

- Date: September 9, 1995
- Game time: 4:00 p.m. EST
- Game attendance: 57,751
- Box score

Game information
First quarter
- UM - R. Collins 1-yard run (D. Prewitt kick)
- UM - G. Daphnis 31-yard pass from R. Collins (D. Prewitt kick)

Second quarter

- UM - Y. Green 7-yard pass from R. Collins (D. Prewitt kick)
- UM - T. Jones 14-yard run (D. Prewitt kick)
- FAMU - J. Stephens 40-yard field goal
- UM - D. Ferguson 1-yard run (D. Prewitt kick)

Third quarter

- UM - T. Gaiter 46-yard punt return (D. Prewitt kick)

Fourth quarter

- UM - D. McMillian 3-yard run (D. Prewitt kick)

=== Virginia Tech ===
#17 Miami Hurricanes at Virginia Tech Hokies

Quarter	1	2	3	4	Total
Miami (FL)	0	7	0	0	7
Virginia Tech	7	3	0	3	13

at Lane Stadium, Blacksburg, Virginia

- Date: September 23, 1995
- Game attendance: 51,206
- Box score

Game information
First quarter
- VT - D. Thomas 1-yard run (A. Larsen kick)

Second quarter

- VT - A. Larsen 44-yard field goal
- UM - D. Ferguson 5-yard run (D. Prewitt kick)

Third quarter

- No scoring

Fourth quarter

- VT - A. Larsen 20-yard field goal

=== Florida State ===
Miami Hurricanes at #1 Florida State Seminoles

Quarter	1	2	3	4	Total
Miami (FL)	7	0	3	7	17
Florida State	7	17	7	10	41

at Doak Campbell Stadium, Tallahassee, Florida

- Date: October 7, 1995
- Game attendance: 80,350
- TV: ESPN
- Box score

Game information
First quarter
- FSU - P.B. Williams 1 run (S. Bentley kick)
- UM - T. Jones recovered blocked punt in end zone (D. Prewitt kick)

Second quarter

- FSU - S. Bentley 34 FG
- FSU - A. Cooper 8 pass from D. Kanell (S. Bentley kick)
- FSU - A. Cooper 26 pass from D. Kanell (S. Bentley kick)

Third quarter

- FSU - W. Dunn 1 run (S. Bentley kick)
- UM - FG D. Prewitt 20

Fourth quarter

- FSU - P. Riley 23 pass from D. Kanell (S. Bentley kick)
- FSU - S. Bentley 33 FG
- UM - M. Benton 42 pass from S. Covington (D. Prewitt kick)

=== Rutgers ===
Rutgers Scarlet Knights at Miami Hurricanes

Quarter	1	2	3	4	Total
Rutgers	7	7	0	7	21
Miami (FL)	14	35	0	7	56

at Orange Bowl, Miami, Florida

- Date: October 14, 1995
- Game time: 7:30 p.m. EST
- Game attendance: 42,642
- Recap, pg. 124

Game information
First quarter
- RUT - Battaglia 7-yard pass from Lucas (Mike-Mayer kick)
- UM - German 59-yard pass from Clement (Prewitt kick)
- UM - Green 28-yard pass from Clement (Prewitt kick)

Second quarter

- UM - Ferguson 1-yard run (Prewitt kick)
- UM - Ferguson 46-yard pass from Clement (Prewitt kick)
- UM - McMillan 2-yard run (Prewitt kick)
- UM - Ward 26-yard blocked punt return (Prewitt kick)
- UM - Benton 61-yard pass from Covington (Prewitt kick)
- RUT - Lucas 11-yard run (Mike-Mayer kick)

Third quarter

- No scoring

Fourth quarter

- UM - Lewis 64-yard INT return (Prewitt kick)
- RUT - Harper 3-yard pass from Lucas (Mike-Mayer kick)

=== Pitt ===
Miami Hurricanes at Pitt Panthers

Quarter	1	2	3	4	Total
Miami (FL)	7	0	3	7	17
Pitt	3	10	3	0	16

at Pitt Stadium, Pittsburgh, Pennsylvania

- Date: October 21, 1995
- Game time: 12:00 p.m. EST
- Game attendance: 28,794
- Box score

Game information
First quarter
- PITT - C. Ferencik 34-yard field goal
- UM - S. Tucker 15-yard pass from R. Clement (D. Prewitt kick)

Second quarter

- PITT - P. Gonzales 2-yard run (C. Ferencik kick)
- PITT - C. Ferencik 26-yard field goal

Third quarter

- UM - D. Prewitt 47-yard field goal
- PITT - C. Ferencik 39-yard field goal

Fourth quarter

- UM - D. Ferguson 16-yard run (D. Prewitt kick)

=== Temple ===
Temple Owls at Miami Hurricanes

Quarter	1	2	3	4	Total
Temple	3	9	0	0	12
Miami (FL)	7	13	9	7	36

at Miami Orange Bowl, Miami, Florida

- Date: October 28, 1995
- Game attendance: 28,147
- Box score

Game information
First quarter
- UM - German 77 pass from Clement (Prewitt kick)
- TEM - FG Michalski 34

Second quarter

- TEM - V Johnson 39 pass from Burris (Michalski kick)
- UM - Ferguson 23 run (Prewitt kick)
- UM - Ferguson 2 run (kick failed)
- TEM - 2 point defensive conversion by Adams

Third quarter

- UM - FG Prewitt 36
- UM - Clement 1 run (two-point conversion failed)
- UM - German 30 pass from Covington (Prewitt kick)

Fourth quarter

- No scoring

=== Baylor ===
Baylor Bears at Miami Hurricanes

Quarter	1	2	3	4	Total
Baylor	7	0	0	7	14
Miami (FL)	0	14	14	7	35

at Miami Orange Bowl, Miami, Florida

- Date: November 4, 1995
- Game time: 12:00 p.m. EST
- Game attendance: 32,655
- Box score

Game information
First quarter
- BAY - J. Douglas 2-yard run (J. Van Dyke kick)

Second quarter

- UM - C. Jones 34-yard interception return (D. Prewitt kick)
- UM - D. Ferguson 10-yard run (D. Prewitt kick)

Third quarter

- UM - D. Ferguson 1-yard run (D. Prewitt kick)
- UM - D. Ferguson 16-yard run (D. Prewitt kick)

Fourth quarter

- UM - D. McMillian 16-yard run (D. Prewitt kick)
- BAY - K. Muhammad 41-yard pass from J. Alfred (J. Van Dyke kick)

=== Boston College ===
Miami Hurricanes at Boston College Eagles

Quarter	1	2	3	4	Total
Miami (FL)	7	0	7	3	17
Boston College	0	0	0	14	14

at Alumni Stadium, Chestnut Hill, Massachusetts

- Date: November 11, 1995
- Game attendance: 44,500
- Box score

Game information
First quarter
- UM - G. Daphnis 56-yard pass from R. Clement (D. Prewitt kick)

Second quarter

- No scoring

Third quarter

- UM - D. Ferguson 85-yard run (D. Prewitt kick)

Fourth quarter

- BC - S. Everson 3-yard pass from M. Hartsell (D. McGuire kick)
- BC - O. Walker 1-yard run (D. McGuire kick)
- UM - D. Prewitt 24-yard field goal

=== West Virginia ===
West Virginia Mountaineers at #25 Miami Hurricanes

Quarter	1	2	3	4	Total
West Virginia	0	9	3	0	12
Miami (FL)	0	7	7	3	17

at Miami Orange Bowl, Miami, Florida

- Date: October 21, 1995
- Game time: 4:00 p.m. EST
- Game attendance: 43,409
- Box score

Game information
First quarter
- No scoring

Second quarter

- WVU - B. Baumann 19-yard field goal
- UM - D. Harris 6-yard run (D. Prewitt kick)
- WVU - D. Saunders 28-yard pass from C. Johnston (kick failed)

Third quarter

- UM - C. Joseph 17-yard run (D. Prewitt kick)
- WVU - B. Baumann 36-yard field goal

Fourth quarter

- UM - D. Prewitt 33-yard field goal

=== Syracuse ===
#22 Syracuse Orangemen at #25 Miami Hurricanes

Quarter	1	2	3	4	Total
Syracuse	10	14	0	0	24
Miami (FL)	0	14	14	7	35

at Miami Orange Bowl, Miami, Florida

- Date: November 25, 1995
- Game time: 7:30 p.m. EST
- Game attendance: 47,544
- Box score

Game information
First quarter
- SYR - M. Thomas 1 pass from D. McNabb (O. Mare kick)
- SYR - O. Mare 47 FG

Second quarter

- UM - D. Ferguson 2 run (D. Prewitt kick)
- SYR - D. McNabb 17 run (O. Mare kick)
- UM - D. Ferguson 3 run (D. Prewitt kick)
- SYR - Thomas 3 run (O. Mare kick)

Third quarter

- UM - Tucker 4 pass from R. Clement (D. Prewitt kick)
- UM - T. Jones 2 run (D. Prewitt kick)

Fourth quarter

- UM - O. Rolle 25 pass from D. McMillian (D. Prewitt kick)

== Personnel ==
=== Coaching staff ===
Name	Position	Seasons	Alma mater
Butch Davis	Head coach	1st	Arkansas (1973)
Larry Coker	Offensive coordinator/quarterbacks	1st	Northeastern State (OK) (1970)
Bill Miller	Defensive coordinator	1st	Texas-Arlington (1978)
Pete Garcia	Recruiting Coordinator	1st	Miami (1984)
Chuck Pagano	Defensive backs	1st	Florida (1984)
Rick Petri	Defensive line	3rd	Missouri-Rolla (1976)
Art Kehoe	offensive line	11th	Miami (1982)
Don Soldinger	Running backs	6th	Memphis (1967)
Randy Shannon	Linebackers	4th	Miami (1989)
Charlie Williams	Wide receivers	3rd	Colorado State (1982)

=== Support staff ===
Name	Position	Seasons	Alma mater
Dale Hulett	Strength & Conditioning	1st	SUNY-Cortland (1978)
Rob Chudzinski	Graduate Assistant	2nd	Miami (1990)
Rusty Medearis	Graduate Assistant	1st	Miami (1993)

=== Roster ===
1995 Miami Hurricanes football team roster
Players
Coaches
Offense

Pos.	#	Name	Class
QB	11	Scott Covington	Fr
WR	7	Jammi German	So
WR	87	Yatil Green	So

Defense

Pos.	#	Name	Class
LB	52	Ray Lewis	Jr
LB	45	Twan Russell	Jr
DB	23	Duane Starks	Jr

Special teams

Pos.	#	Name	Class
K	21	Dane Prewitt	Sr

Head coach

- Butch Davis

Coordinators/assistant coaches

Legend

- (C) Team captain
- (S) Suspended
- (I) Ineligible
- Injured
- Redshirt

Roster

== Statistics ==
=== Passing ===
Player	Cmp	Att	Pct	Yards	TD	INT
Ryan Clement	119	201	59.2	1,638	7	10
Ryan Collins	34	60	56.7	478	3	2
Scott Covington	22	42	52.4	324	3	2
Dyral McMillan	1	1	100.0	25	1	0

=== Rushing ===
Player	Att	Yards	Avg	TD
Danyell Ferguson	212	1,069	5.0	12
Dyral McMillan	81	322	4.0	3
Ryan Clement	36	-76	-2.1	1
Trent Jones	28	125	4.5	2
Ryan Collins	18	36	2.0	1
Derrick Harris	16	42	2.6	1
Scott Covington	9	-20	-2.2	0
Carlo Joseph	5	27	5.4	1
Tony Gaiter	3	21	7.0	0
Jammi German	1	7	7.0	0
Nick Williams	1	3	3.0	0

=== Receiving ===
Player	Rec	Yards	Avg	TD
Jammi German	41	730	17.8	3
Yatil Green	25	476	19.0	2
Danyell Ferguson	22	248	11.3	1
Gerard Daphnis	14	236	16.9	2
Omar Rolle	12	175	14.6	1
Syii Tucker	12	134	11.2	3
Derrick Harris	10	77	7.7	0
Carlo Joseph	8	51	6.4	0
Dyral McMillan	7	56	8.0	0
Magic Benton	6	149	24.8	2
Chris C. Jones	6	40	6.7	0
Trent Jones	5	53	10.6	0
Tony Gaiter	4	5	1.3	0
Jermaine Chambers	4	35	8.8	0

== 1996 NFL draft ==
Player	Position	Round	Pick	NFL club
Ray Lewis	Linebacker	1	26	Baltimore Ravens
Derrick Harris	Running back	6	175	St. Louis Rams
