= Pop-Tarts Bowl =

Annual American college football game

- Stadium: Camping World Stadium
- Location: Orlando, Florida
- Previous stadiums: Joe Robbie Stadium (1990–2000)
- Previous locations: Miami Gardens, Florida (1990–2000)
- Operated: 1990–present
- Championship affiliation: Bowl Coalition (1992)
- Conference tie-ins: ACC, Big 12
- Previous conference tie-ins: Big Ten, Big East
- Payout: US$6,071,760 (2019)
- Website: poptartsbowl.com

Sponsors
- Blockbuster (1990–1993); Carquest (1994–1997); MicronPC (1998–2000); Florida Tourism (2001); Mazda (2002–2003); Champs Sports (2004–2011); Russell Athletic (2012–2016); Camping World (2017–2019); Kellogg's (2020–2022); Kellanova (2023–present)

Former names
- Sunshine Classic (1990, working title); Blockbuster Bowl (1990–1993); Carquest Bowl (1994–1997); MicronPC Bowl (1998); MicronPC.com Bowl (1999–2000); Visit Florida Tangerine Bowl (2001); Mazda Tangerine Bowl (2002–2003); Champs Sports Bowl (2004–2011); Russell Athletic Bowl (2012–2016); Camping World Bowl (2017–2019); Cheez-It Bowl (2020–2022) (Note: Not to be confused with the earlier Cheez-It Bowl (2018–2019).)

2025 matchup
- Georgia Tech vs. BYU (BYU 25–21)

The Pop-Tarts Bowl is an annual college football bowl game that is played in Orlando, Florida, at Camping World Stadium. Originally commissioned as the Sunshine Classic, it has undergone many name changes due to sponsorship rights. It is currently named after the Pop-Tarts brand of toaster pastries, produced and distributed by Kellanova (formerly Kellogg's).

The bowl is operated by Florida Citrus Sports, a non-profit group which also organizes the Citrus Bowl and the Florida Classic. It was first played in 1990 in Miami Gardens, Florida, before moving to Orlando in 2001. The game has tie-ins with the Atlantic Coast Conference (ACC) and Big 12 Conference. In the College Football Playoff (CFP) era, the bowl seeks to match the top non-CFP selection from the ACC (inclusive of Notre Dame) against the second non-CFP selection from the Big 12.

== History ==
=== Miami (1990–2000) ===
The bowl was founded in 1990 by Raycom Sports and was originally played at Joe Robbie Stadium in the Miami area. It was briefly given the working title of the Sunshine Football Classic, but it was never played under that moniker. Prior to its first edition, it received corporate title sponsorship. During its Miami existence, it successively went by the names Blockbuster Bowl (three editions), CarQuest Bowl (five editions), and the MicronPC Bowl (three editions).

The bowl arose from a desire to hold a second bowl game in the Miami area. It was to be an accompaniment to the traditional Orange Bowl, showcasing the brand new stadium in the area that was built in 1987. The Orange Bowl game was still being played in the aging old stadium, whereas this new game would be played in the new stadium.

Miami Dolphins owner Wayne Huizenga quickly joined forces with bowl organizers and brought in Blockbuster Video, which he owned, as title sponsor. The inaugural game, played on December 28, 1990, pitted Florida State and Penn State, and two legendary coaches, Bobby Bowden versus Joe Paterno in front of over 74,000 at Joe Robbie Stadium. Subsequent games were unable to match the success of the first, even though the bowl was moved to the more prestigious New Year's Day slot in 1993.

In 1994, CarQuest Auto Parts became the title sponsor after Huizenga sold Blockbuster Video to Viacom. The New Year's Day experiment was short lived as the organizers of the more established Orange Bowl received permission to move their game into Joe Robbie Stadium beginning in 1996. That bumped the Carquest Bowl back to the less-desirable December date. After the 2000 playing, Florida Citrus Sports took over the game and moved it to Orlando.

=== Orlando (2001–present) ===
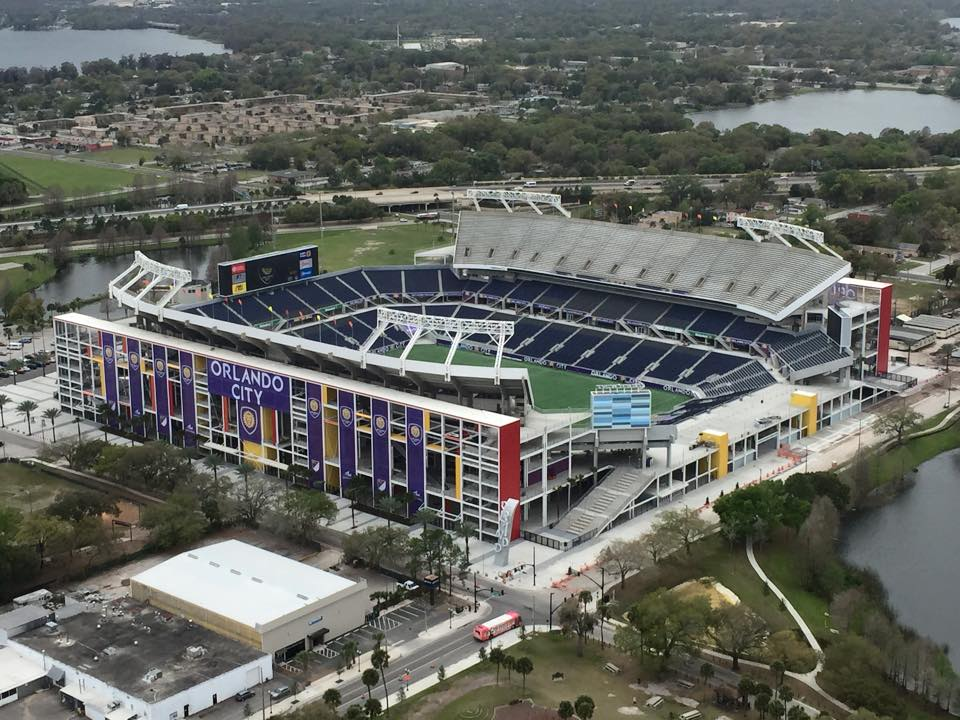
Camping World Stadium in 2015

In Orlando, the bowl was played three times as the Tangerine Bowl, a historical moniker that was once the original title of the Citrus Bowl. Foot Locker, the parent company of Champs Sports, purchased naming rights in 2004, naming it the Champs Sports Bowl, under which eight games were played. In early 2012, naming rights were bought by Russell Athletic; five games were played as the Russell Athletic Bowl. In early 2017, Camping World became the title sponsor of the game through 2019; three editions were staged as the Camping World Bowl, concluding with the 30th playing of the bowl. In May 2020, Kellogg's signed on as the new sponsor of the game, naming the game the Cheez-It Bowl, after the company's brand of snack crackers. In May 2023, it was announced that the sponsorship would be switched to the Pop-Tarts brand, making the game the Pop-Tarts Bowl. Kellogg's had acquired the naming rights to the Citrus Bowl, concurrently moving the Cheez-It sponsorship to that game. In October 2023, Kellogg's ceased to exists as a company, but persisted as a brand name—ownership of Pop-Tarts passed to Kellanova. Kellanova was acquired by Mars Inc. in December 2025.

From 2006 to 2010, the bowl matched teams from the Atlantic Coast Conference (ACC) and the Big Ten Conference. Under the terms of a television deal signed with ESPN in 2006, the bowl was to be held after Christmas Day from 2006 onward, and be shown on ESPN in prime time. The change was made to move the game from the less-desirable pre-Christmas date utilized from 2001 to 2004.

From 2005 to 2009, the stadium faced challenges in preparing the stadium for two bowl games in less than one week (the Citrus Bowl is traditionally held New Year's Day). This was also in part due to the Florida high school football championship games being held at the stadium shortly before the bowls. In 2009, rainy weather turned the stadium's grass field into a muddy, sloppy, quagmire for both bowl games. In 2010, the stadium switched to artificial turf, facilitating the quick turnaround necessary.

In 2009, the bowl announced that the Big East was to be one of the tie-in conferences for four years starting in 2010, with the bowl having the option of selecting Notre Dame once during the four years. In October 2009, the bowl announced that they had extended their agreement with the ACC for the same term. The game would match the third pick from the ACC against the second selection from the Big East. The previous agreement had matched the 4th pick from the ACC against the 4th or 5th pick from the Big Ten. ACC and Big East teams subsequently met in the 2010 through 2013 games, except for 2011 when Notre Dame was selected (as permitted in the agreement with the Big East). In 2013, the Big East's non-football members broke away from the conference under the Big East name, and its football-playing members continued as the American Athletic Conference.

Since 2014, the game features the second pick from the ACC after the New Year's Six bowls make their picks—usually the losing team from the ACC Football Championship Game, or one of the division runners-up—against the third pick from the Big 12.

A new trophy for the bowl was unveiled in December 2023, featuring two slots for Pop-Tarts atop a metallic football. The mascot, named "Strawberry", is a large anthropomorphic Pop-Tart that was deemed the "first-ever edible mascot"; it was lowered into a giant toaster and presented for players to eat after the game, having been replaced by an edible replica.

For the 2024 game, the bowl held a fan vote of three flavors to serve as main mascot: Cinnamon Roll, Hot Fudge Sundae, and Wild Berry. Cinnamon Roll was declared the winner on December 6. The 2024 trophy was also a functional toaster, manufactured by GE Appliances, with a weight of 77 pounds (35 kg). Strawberry received a memorial outside the stadium, and was subsequently "resurrected" following a tribute during the first half—taking the form of a mascot now resembling the replica after it was eaten.

In 2025, bowl organizers promoted the game as “The People’s National Championship.”

== Game results ==
Note: the bowl has twice adopted naming that was previously used by games with a different lineage.

- For earlier bowl games known as the Tangerine Bowl, see Tangerine Bowl (1947–1982)
- For earlier bowl games known as the Cheez-It Bowl, see Cheez-It Bowl (2018–2019)

All rankings are taken from the AP Poll prior to the game being played.

No.	Date	Bowl Name	Winning Team		Losing Team		Attendance
1	December 28, 1990	Blockbuster Bowl	6 Florida State	24	7 Penn State	17	74,021
2	December 28, 1991	Blockbuster Bowl	8 Alabama	30	15 Colorado	25	46,123
3	January 1, 1993	Blockbuster Bowl	13 Stanford	24	21 Penn State	3	45,554
4	January 1, 1994	Carquest Bowl	15 Boston College	31	Virginia	13	38,516
5	January 2, 1995	Carquest Bowl	South Carolina	24	West Virginia	21	50,833
6	December 30, 1995	Carquest Bowl	North Carolina	20	24 Arkansas	10	34,428
7	December 27, 1996	Carquest Bowl	19 Miami (FL)	31	Virginia	21	46,418
8	December 29, 1997	Carquest Bowl	Georgia Tech	35	West Virginia	30	28,262
9	December 29, 1998	MicronPC Bowl	24 Miami (FL)	46	NC State	23	44,387
10	December 30, 1999	MicronPC.com Bowl	Illinois	63	Virginia	21	31,089
11	December 28, 2000	MicronPC.com Bowl	NC State	38	Minnesota	30	28,359
12	December 20, 2001	Tangerine Bowl	Pittsburgh	34	NC State	19	28,562
13	December 23, 2002	Tangerine Bowl	Texas Tech	55	Clemson	15	21,689
14	December 22, 2003	Tangerine Bowl	NC State	56	Kansas	26	26,482
15	December 21, 2004	Champs Sports Bowl	Georgia Tech	51	Syracuse	14	28,237
16	December 27, 2005	Champs Sports Bowl	23 Clemson	19	Colorado	10	31,470
17	December 29, 2006	Champs Sports Bowl	Maryland	24	Purdue	7	40,168
18	December 28, 2007	Champs Sports Bowl	14 Boston College	24	Michigan State	21	46,554
19	December 27, 2008	Champs Sports Bowl	Florida State	42	Wisconsin	13	52,692
20	December 29, 2009	Champs Sports Bowl	24 Wisconsin	20	14 Miami (FL)	14	56,747
21	December 28, 2010	Champs Sports Bowl	NC State	23	22 West Virginia	7	48,962
22	December 29, 2011	Champs Sports Bowl	25 Florida State	18	Notre Dame	14	68,305
23	December 28, 2012	Russell Athletic Bowl	Virginia Tech	13	Rutgers	10 (OT)	48,129
24	December 28, 2013	Russell Athletic Bowl	18 Louisville	36	Miami (FL)	9	51,098
25	December 29, 2014	Russell Athletic Bowl	18 Clemson	40	Oklahoma	6	40,071
26	December 29, 2015	Russell Athletic Bowl	18 Baylor	49	10 North Carolina	38	40,418
27	December 28, 2016	Russell Athletic Bowl	Miami (FL)	31	14 West Virginia	14	48,625
28	December 28, 2017	Camping World Bowl	17 Oklahoma State	30	22 Virginia Tech	21	39,610
29	December 28, 2018	Camping World Bowl	17 Syracuse	34	15 West Virginia	18	41,125
30	December 28, 2019	Camping World Bowl	14 Notre Dame	33	Iowa State	9	46,948
31	December 29, 2020	Cheez-It Bowl	Oklahoma State	37	18 Miami (FL)	34	0 (Note: Due to the COVID-19 pandemic, there was no reported attendance at the 2020 game.)
32	December 29, 2021	Cheez-It Bowl	22 Clemson	20	Iowa State	13	39,051
33	December 29, 2022	Cheez-It Bowl	13 Florida State	35	Oklahoma	32	61,520
34	December 28, 2023	Pop-Tarts Bowl	Kansas State	28	19 NC State	19	31,111
35	December 28, 2024	Pop-Tarts Bowl	18 Iowa State	42	15 Miami (FL)	41	38,650
36	December 27, 2025	Pop-Tarts Bowl	12 BYU	25	24 Georgia Tech	21	34,126

Games 1–11 played in Miami Gardens, Florida
Games 12–present played in Orlando, Florida

== MVPs ==
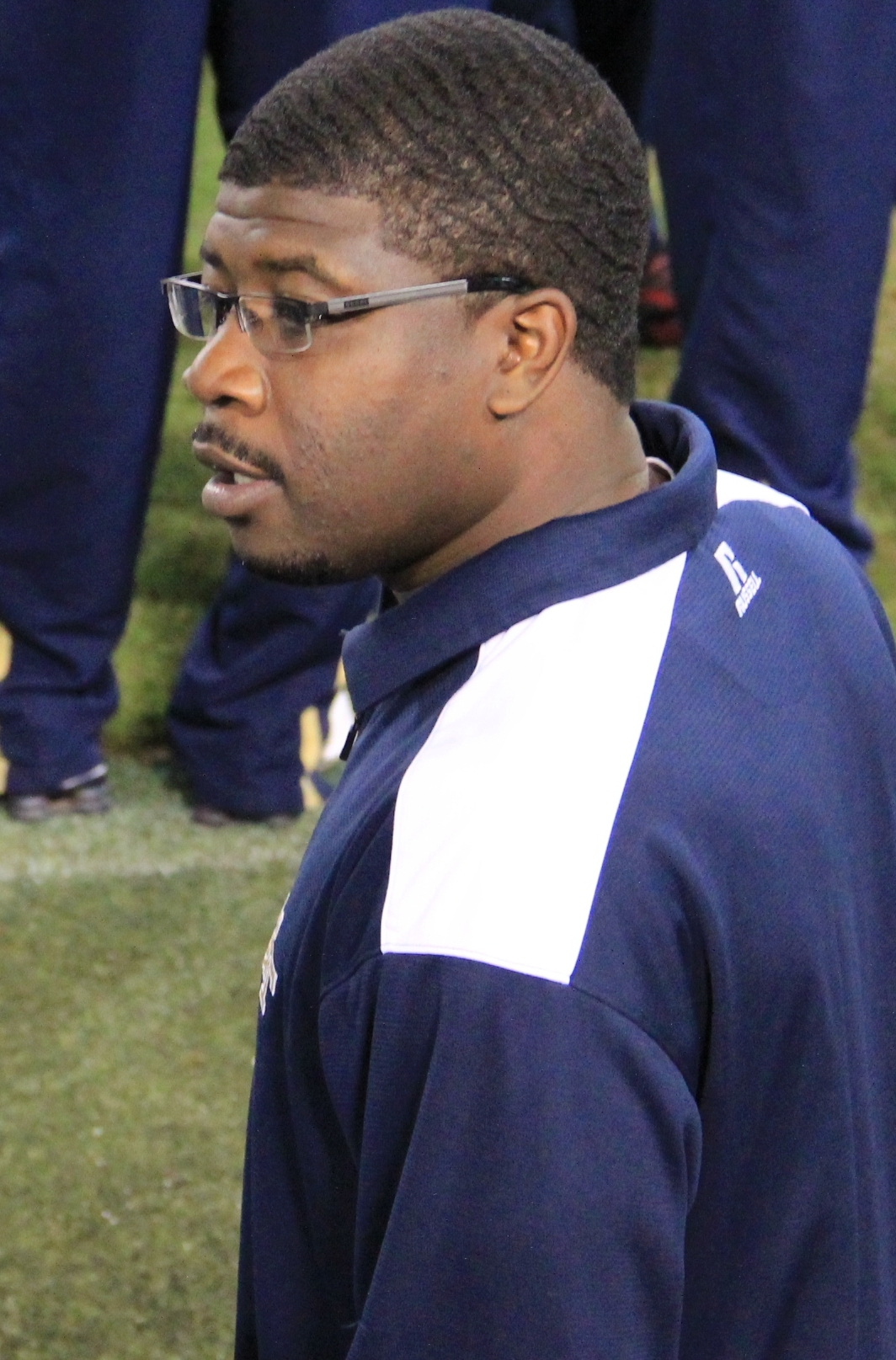
1997 MVP Joe Hamilton

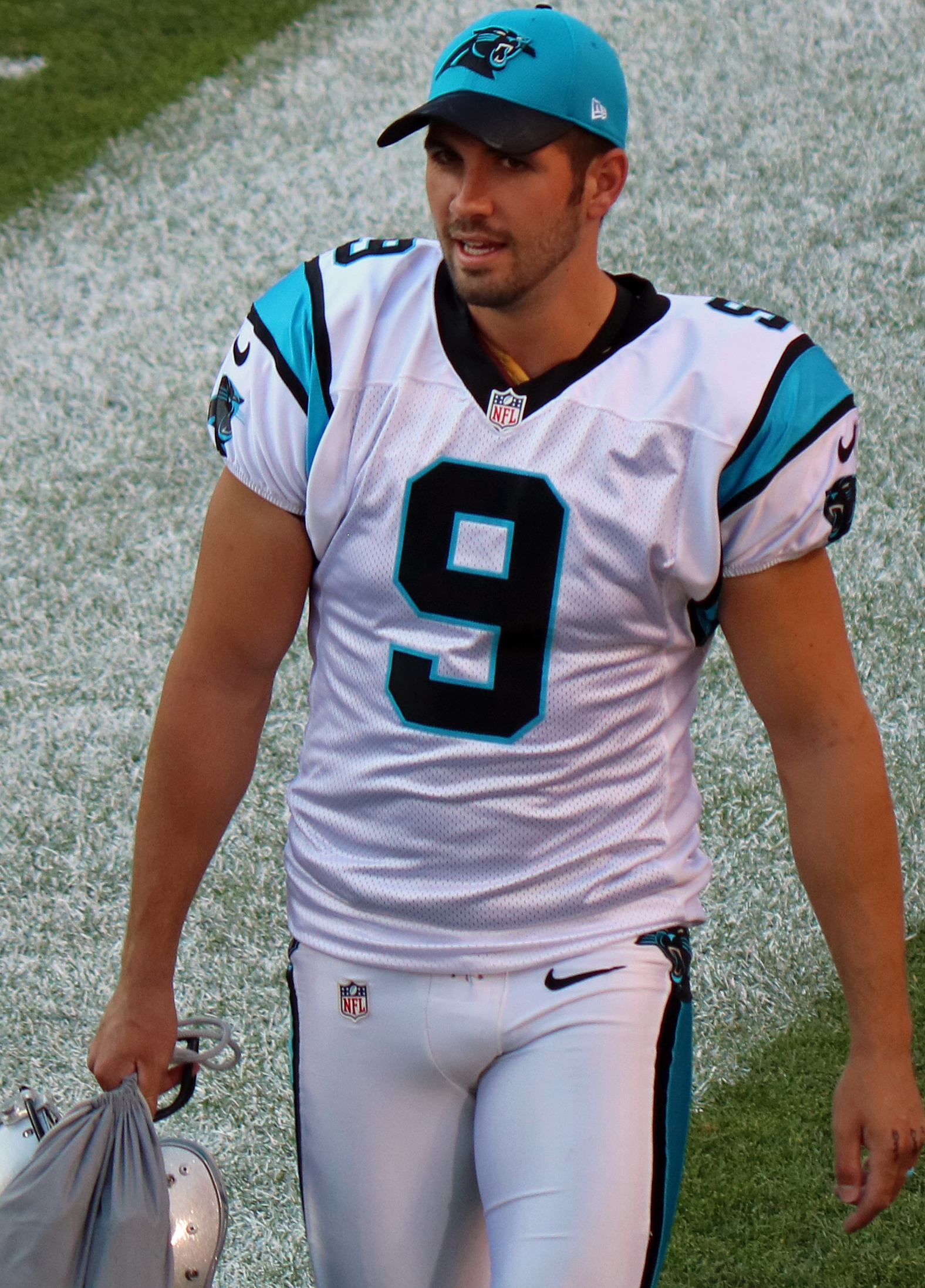
2008 MVP Graham Gano

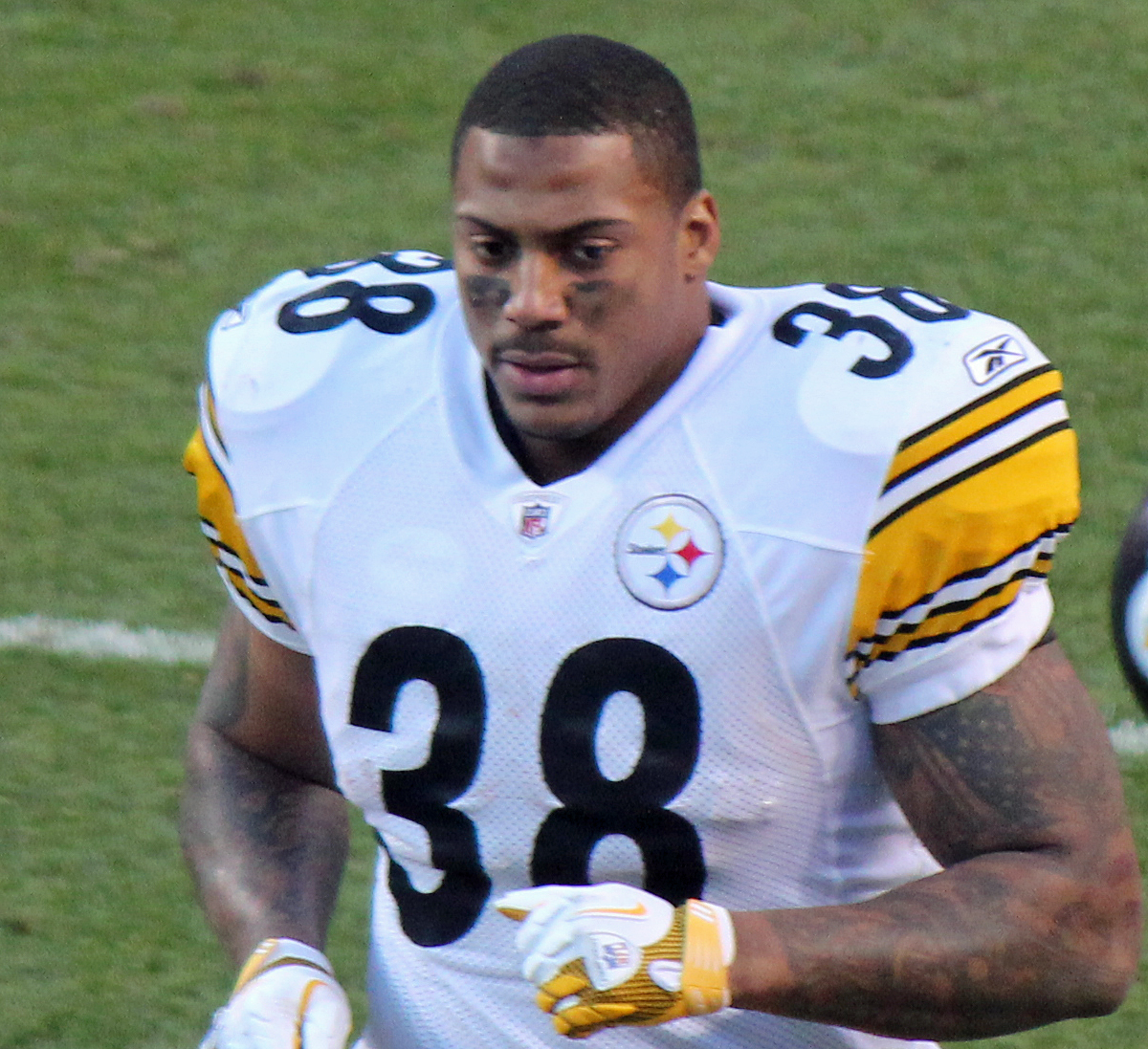
2009 MVP John Clay

Date	MVP	School	Position
December 28, 1990	Amp Lee	Florida State	RB
December 28, 1991	David Palmer	Alabama	WR
January 1, 1993	Darrien Gordon	Stanford	CB
January 1, 1994	Glenn Foley	Boston College	QB
January 2, 1995	Steve Taneyhill	South Carolina	QB
December 30, 1995	Leon Johnson	North Carolina	RB
December 27, 1996	Tremain Mack	Miami	SS
December 29, 1997	Joe Hamilton	Georgia Tech	QB
December 29, 1998	Scott Covington	Miami	QB
December 30, 1999	Kurt Kittner	Illinois	QB
December 28, 2000	Philip Rivers	NC State	QB
December 20, 2001	Antonio Bryant	Pittsburgh	WR
December 23, 2002	Kliff Kingsbury	Texas Tech	QB
December 22, 2003	Philip Rivers	NC State	QB
December 21, 2004	Reggie Ball	Georgia Tech	QB
December 27, 2005	James Davis	Clemson	RB
December 29, 2006	Sam Hollenbach	Maryland	QB
December 28, 2007	Jamie Silva	Boston College	FS
December 27, 2008	Graham Gano	Florida State	K/P
December 29, 2009	John Clay	Wisconsin	RB
December 28, 2010	Russell Wilson	NC State	QB
December 29, 2011	Rashad Greene	Florida State	WR
December 28, 2012	Antone Exum	Virginia Tech	CB
December 28, 2013	Teddy Bridgewater	Louisville	QB
December 29, 2014	Cole Stoudt	Clemson	QB
December 29, 2015	Johnny Jefferson	Baylor	RB
December 28, 2016	Brad Kaaya	Miami	QB
December 28, 2017	Mason Rudolph	Oklahoma State	QB
December 28, 2018	Eric Dungey	Syracuse	QB
December 28, 2019	Chase Claypool	Notre Dame	WR
December 29, 2020	Spencer Sanders	Oklahoma State	QB
December 29, 2021	Mario Goodrich	Clemson	DB
December 29, 2022	Jordan Travis	Florida State	QB
December 28, 2023	Avery Johnson	Kansas State	QB
December 28, 2024	Rocco Becht	Iowa State	QB
December 27, 2025	Bear Bachmeier	BYU	QB

== Most appearances ==
Updated through the December 2025 edition (36 games, 72 total appearances).

Teams with multiple appearances

Rank	Team	Appearances	Won	Lost	Win pct.
1	Miami (FL)	7	3	4	.429
2	NC State	6	3	3	.500
3	West Virginia	5	0	5	.000
4	Florida State	4	4	0	1.000
4	Clemson	4	3	1	.750
6	Georgia Tech	3	2	1	.667
6	Iowa State	3	1	2	.333
6	Virginia	3	0	3	.000
9	Boston College	2	2	0	1.000
9	Oklahoma State	2	2	0	1.000
9	North Carolina	2	1	1	.500
9	Notre Dame	2	1	1	.500
9	Syracuse	2	1	1	.500
9	Virginia Tech	2	1	1	.500
9	Wisconsin	2	1	1	.500
9	Oklahoma	2	0	2	.000
9	Colorado	2	0	2	.000
9	Penn State	2	0	2	.000

Teams with a single appearance

Won (11): Alabama, Baylor, BYU, Illinois, Kansas State, Louisville, Maryland, Pittsburgh, South Carolina, Stanford, Texas Tech
Lost (6): Arkansas, Kansas, Michigan State, Minnesota, Purdue, Rutgers

Duke, Wake Forest, California and SMU are the only current ACC members yet to appeared in this bowl.

== Appearances by conference ==
Updated through the December 2025 edition (36 games, 72 total appearances).

Conference	Record				Appearances by season	
Conference	Games	W	L	Win pct.	Won	Lost
ACC	31	17	14	.548	1995, 1997, 2000, 2003, 2004, 2005, 2006, 2007, 2008, 2010, 2011, 2012, 2014, 2016, 2018, 2021, 2022	1993*, 1996, 1998, 1999, 2001, 2002, 2009, 2013, 2015, 2017, 2020, 2023, 2024, 2025
Big 12	15	7	8	.467	2002, 2015, 2017, 2020, 2023, 2024, 2025	2003, 2005, 2014, 2016, 2018, 2019, 2021, 2022
American	10	5	5	.500	1993*, 1996, 1998, 2001, 2013	1994*, 1997, 2004, 2010, 2012
Big Ten	6	2	4	.333	1999, 2009	2000, 2006, 2007, 2008
Independents	5	2	3	.400	1990, 2019	1990, 1992*, 2011
SEC	3	2	1	.667	1991, 1994*	1995
Pac-10	1	1	0	1.000	1992*	
Big Eight	1	0	1	.000		1991

- Games marked with an asterisk (*) were played in January of the following calendar year.
- The record of the American Conference includes appearances of the Big East Conference, as the American Conference retains the charter of the original Big East, following its 2013 realignment. Teams representing the Big East appeared in nine games, compiling a 4–5 record.
- The Big Eight Conference dissolved after the 1995 season.
- Independents: Penn State (1990, 1992), Florida State (1990), Notre Dame (2011, 2019)

== Game records ==
Team	Record, Team vs. Opponent	Year
Most points scored (one team)	63, Illinois vs. Virginia	1999
Most points scored (both teams)	87, Baylor vs. North Carolina	2015
Most points scored (losing team)	41, Miami vs. Iowa State	2024
Fewest points allowed	3, Stanford vs. Penn State	1993 (Jan.)
Largest margin of victory	42, Illinois vs. Virginia	1999
Total yards	587, Florida State vs. Oklahoma	2022
Rushing yards	645, Baylor vs. North Carolina	2015
Passing yards	481, NC State vs. Kansas	2003
First downs	38, Baylor vs. North Carolina	2015
Fewest yards allowed	124, Clemson vs. Colorado	2005
Fewest rushing yards allowed	–11, Alabama vs. Colorado	1991
Fewest passing yards allowed	103, Clemson vs. Oklahoma	2014
Individual	Record, Player, Team vs. Opponent	Year
All-purpose yards	327, Koren Robinson (NC State)	2000
Touchdowns (all-purpose)		
Rushing yards	299, Johnny Jefferson (Baylor)	2015
Rushing touchdowns	3, Johnny Jefferson (Baylor)	2015
Passing yards	475, Philip Rivers (NC State)	2003
Passing touchdowns	5, Philip Rivers (NC State)	2003
Receiving yards	202, Johnny Wilson (Florida State)	2022
Receiving touchdowns	3, Brennan Presley (Oklahoma State)	2020
Tackles	22 Donnie Miles (North Carolina)	2015
Sacks	3.0, Kendall Coleman (Syracuse)	2018
Interceptions	2, shared by: Brandon Jones (Rutgers); Jamie Silva (Boston College); Ronde Barber (Virginia); Vincent Meeks (Texas Tech)	2012; 2007; 1996; 2002
Long Plays	Record, Player, Team vs. Opponent	Year
Touchdown run	84 yds., Tony Jones Jr. (Notre Dame)	2019
Touchdown pass	87 yds., Mike Thomas to LC Stevens (North Carolina)	1995
Kickoff return	90 yds., Gregory Gordon (NC State)	2001
Punt return	59 yds., Wes Welker (Texas Tech)	2002
Interception return	47 yds., Ben Boulware (Clemson)	2014
Fumble return	75 yds., Derek Nicholson (Florida State)	2008
Punt	68 yds., John Torp (Colorado)	2005
Field goal	51 yds., B. T. Potter (Clemson)	2021
Miscellaneous	Record, Teams	Year
Longest Time of Possession	39:48, Maryland vs. Purdue	2006
Largest attendance	74,021, Florida State vs. Penn State	1990
Most Appearances	7, Miami (FL)	1996, 1998, 2009, 2013, 2016, 2020, 2024
Most Victories	4, Florida State	1990, 2008, 2011, 2022

== Media coverage ==
The bowl was televised by Raycom in its inaugural year, followed by CBS Sports (four editions), TBS (six editions), and ESPN since 2001.
