= James Stewart (Minnesota Vikings) =

American football player (born 1971)

No. 28
- Position: Running back

Personal information
- Born: December 8, 1971 (age 54); Vero Beach, Florida, U.S.
- Listed height: 6 ft 2 in (1.88 m)
- Listed weight: 238 lb (108 kg)

Career information
- High school: Vero Beach
- College: Miami (FL) (1991–1994)
- NFL draft: 1995: 5th round, 157th overall pick

Career history
- Minnesota Vikings (1995–1996); Miami Tropics (2000)

Career NFL statistics
- Rushing yards: 144
- Rushing average: 4.6
- Receptions: 1
- Receiving yards: 3
- Stats at Pro Football Reference

James Alvin Stewart (born December 8, 1971) is an American former professional football player who was a running back for the Minnesota Vikings of the National Football League (NFL) in 1995 and 1996. He played college football for the Miami Hurricanes.

== Biography ==
Stewart played high school football at Vero Beach High School in Vero Beach, Florida, where he rushed for 1,932 yards in his senior season. Heavily recruited by college football programs, Stewart decided to attend the University of Miami in Coral Gables, Florida. He redshirted in 1991, and did not play in 1992 due to a shoulder injury. He then played a total of 20 games for the Miami Hurricanes in 1993 and 1994, rushing for 1,328 yards and 17 touchdowns. While at Miami, he was teammates with Warren Sapp. The 1994 Hurricanes reached the Bowl Coalition's championship game for that season, the 1995 Orange Bowl, where Stewart rushed for 72 net yards as Miami lost to Nebraska, 24–17.

Stewart was selected in the fifth round of the 1995 NFL draft by the Minnesota Vikings. With the 1995 Vikings, he appeared in four games, rushing for 144 yards on 31 carries. He sustained a broken fibula in a November game against the New Orleans Saints, and did not play again that season. During the 1996 preseason, Stewart again broke the same bone, against the same team, the Saints. He was subsequently placed on injured reserve, missing the season. Stewart was released by the Vikings in August 1997. He would return to play for the Miami Tropics of the short lived Spring Football League in 2000.

In April 2002, Stewart was indicted on counterfeit currency charges after being found in possession of counterfeit bills during a traffic stop. June 2003, Stewart pleaded guilty to federal charges related to cocaine distribution. He was subsequently sentenced to four years and four months in federal prison.
