= 1994 Miami Hurricanes football team =

American college football season

1994 Miami Hurricanes football

Big East champion

Orange Bowl (BC NCG), L 17–24 vs. Nebraska
- Conference: Big East Conference

Ranking
- Coaches: No. 6
- AP: No. 6
- Record: 10–2 (7–0 Big East)
- Head coach: Dennis Erickson (6th season)
- Offensive coordinator: Rich Olson (3rd season)
- Offensive scheme: One-back spread
- Defensive coordinator: Greg McMackin (2nd season)
- Base defense: 4–3
- MVP: Warren Sapp
- Home stadium: Miami Orange Bowl

1994 Big East Conference football standings
	Conf.					Overall
Team	W		L		T	W		L		T
No. 6 Miami (FL) $	7	–	0	–	0	10	–	2	–	0
Virginia Tech	5	–	2	–	0	8	–	4	–	0
Syracuse	4	–	3	–	0	7	–	4	–	0
West Virginia	4	–	3	–	0	7	–	6	–	0
No. 23 Boston College	3	–	3	–	1	7	–	4	–	1
Rutgers	2	–	4	–	1	5	–	5	–	1
Pittsburgh	2	–	5	–	0	3	–	8	–	0
Temple	0	–	7	–	0	2	–	9	–	0
$ – Conference champion; Rankings from AP Poll

The 1994 Miami Hurricanes football team represented the University of Miami during the 1994 NCAA Division I-A football season. It was the Hurricanes' 69th season of football and fourth as a member of the Big East Conference. The Hurricanes were led by sixth-year head coach Dennis Erickson and played their home games at the Orange Bowl. They finished the season 10–2 overall and 7–0 in the Big East to finish as conference champion. They were invited to the Orange Bowl, which served as the Bowl Coalition National Championship Game, where they lost to Nebraska, 24–17.

== Schedule ==
Date	Time	Opponent	Rank	Site	TV	Result	Attendance	Source
September 3	4:00 pm	Georgia Southern*	No. 6	Miami Orange Bowl; Miami, FL		W 56–0	54,058	
September 10	10:00 pm	at Arizona State*	No. 5	Sun Devil Stadium; Tempe, AZ	ESPN	W 47–10	48,729	
September 24	3:30 pm	No. 17 Washington*	No. 6	Miami Orange Bowl; Miami, FL	ABC	L 20–38	62,663	
October 1	12:00 pm	at Rutgers	No. 13	Rutgers Stadium; Piscataway, NJ	BEN	W 24–3	39,719	
October 8	7:30 pm	No. 3 Florida State*	No. 13	Miami Orange Bowl; Miami, FL (rivalry, College GameDay)	ESPN	W 34–20	77,019	
October 22	12:00 pm	at West Virginia	No. 7	Mountaineer Field; Morgantown, WV	BEN	W 38–6	63,760	
October 29	3:30 pm	No. 13 Virginia Tech^{†}	No. 6	Miami Orange Bowl; Miami, FL (rivalry)	ABC	W 24–3	65,208	
November 5	3:30 pm	at No. 10 Syracuse	No. 5	Carrier Dome; Syracuse, NY	ABC	W 27–6	49,565	
November 12	4:00 pm	Pittsburgh	No. 5	Miami Orange Bowl; Miami, FL		W 17–12	50,058	
November 19	1:00 pm	at Temple	No. 5	Veterans Stadium; Philadelphia, PA	PPV	W 38–14	11,873	
November 26	7:30 pm	No. 25 Boston College	No. 5	Miami Orange Bowl; Miami, FL	ESPN	W 23–7	60,579	
January 1	8:00 pm	vs. No. 1 Nebraska*	No. 3	Miami Orange Bowl; Miami, FL (Orange Bowl, rivalry)	NBC	L 17–24	81,753	
*Non-conference game; ^{†}Homecoming; Rankings from AP Poll released prior to the game; All times are in Eastern time

== Rankings ==
Ranking movements Legend: ██ Increase in ranking ██ Decrease in ranking ( ) = First-place votes
	Week																
Poll	Pre	1	2	3	4	5	6	7	8	9	10	11	12	13	14	15	Final
AP	6 (1)	6 (1)	5 (1)	5 (1)	6 (1)	13	13	8	7	6	5	5	5	5	4	3	6
Coaches	6 (2)		6 (2)	6 (2)	6 (2)	12	10	7	4	4	3	3	4	5	4	3	6

== Game summaries ==
=== Georgia Southern ===
Ga. Southern at Miami (FL)

Team	1	2	3	4	Total
Eagles	0	0	0	0	0
• No. 6 Hurricanes	14	14	14	14	56

- Date: September 3
- Location: Orange Bowl
- Game attendance: 54,058

Scoring summary
Q1	MIA	Stewart 31 yard run (Prewitt kick)	MIA 7–0
Q1	MIA	L. Jones 5 yard run (Prewitt kick)	MIA 14–0
Q2	MIA	Stewart 16 yard run (Prewitt kick)	MIA 21–0
Q2	MIA	C.T. Jones 11 yard pass from Collins (Prewitt kick)	MIA 28–0
Q3	MIA	Stewart 2 yard run (Prewitt kick)	MIA 35–0
Q3	MIA	T. Jones 23 yard pass from Costa (Prewitt kick)	MIA 42–0
Q4	MIA	Shipman 82 yard run (Prewitt kick)	MIA 49–0
Q4	MIA	Ferguson 5 yard run (Prewitt kick)	MIA 56–0

=== Washington ===
Washington at Miami (FL)

Team	1	2	3	4	Total
• No. 19 Huskies	0	3	25	10	38
No. 5 Hurricanes	3	11	3	3	20

- Date: September 24
- Location: Orange Bowl, Miami, FL
- Game attendance: 62,663
- TV announcers (ABC): Brent Musburger, Dick Vermeil, and Jack Arute

Nicknamed the "Whammy in Miami", Washington's win in the Orange Bowl snapped a 58-game home winning streak for the Hurricanes.

=== Vs. Nebraska (Orange Bowl) ===
Nebraska vs. Miami

Team	1	2	3	4	Total
No. 3 Hurricanes	10	0	7	0	17
• No. 1 Cornhuskers	0	7	2	15	24

- Date: January 1
- Location: Miami Orange Bowl, Miami
- Game attendance: 81,753

Scoring summary
1	7:54	MIA	Dane Prewitt 44-yard field goal	MIA 3–0
1	0:04	MIA	Trent Jones 35-yard pass from Frank Costa (Dane Prewitt kick)	MIA 10–0
2	7:54	NEB	Mark Gilman 19-yard pass from Brook Berringer (Tom Sieler kick)	MIA 10–7
3	13:19	MIA	Jonathan Harris 44-yard pass from Frank Costa (Dane Prewitt kick)	MIA 17–7
3	11:35	NEB	Team Safety	MIA 17–9
4	7:38	NEB	Cory Schlesinger 15-yard run (Eric Alford 2-pt reception)	Tied 17–17
4	2:46	NEB	Cory Schlesinger 14-yard run (Tom Sieler kick)	NEB 24–17

== Personnel ==
=== Coaching staff ===
Name	Position	Seasons	Alma mater
Dennis Erickson	Head coach	6th	Montana State (1969)
Rich Olson	Offensive coordinator/wide receivers	3rd	Washington State (1971)
Greg McMackin	Defensive coordinator	2nd	Southern Oregon (1967)
Gregg Smith	Offensive line	6th	Idaho (1969)
Dave Arnold	Special Teams/running backs	6th	
Rick Petri	Defensive line	2nd	Missouri-Rolla (1976)
Art Kehoe	Assistant offensive line	10th	Miami (1982)
Randy Shannon	Linebackers	3rd	Miami (1989)
Charlie Williams	Wide receivers	2nd	Colorado State (1982)

=== Support staff ===
Name	Position	Seasons	Alma mater
Greg Mark	Graduate Assistant	3rd	Miami (1991)
Rob Chudzinski	Graduate Assistant	1st	Miami (1990)

=== Roster ===
1994 Miami Hurricanes football team roster
Players
Coaches
Offense

Pos.	#	Name	Class
QB	6	Ryan Clement	Fr
QB	17	Scott Covington	Fr
QB	11	Frank Costa	Sr
WR	7	Jammi German	So
WR	87	Yatil Green	Fr
WR	85	Chris Jones	Sr
RB	28	James Stewart	Jr

Defense

Pos.	#	Name	Class
DE	90	Kenny Holmes	So
DT	94	Dwayne Johnson	Sr
DE	96	Kenard Lang	Fr
LB	52	Ray Lewis	So
DB	9	Chad Wilson	Sr
DB	24	Tremain Mack	Fr
DB	18	C. J. Richardson	Sr
DT	43	Pat Riley	Sr
LB	45	Twan Russell	So
DT	76	Warren Sapp	Jr

Special teams

Pos.	#	Name	Class
K	21	Maurice Washington	Jr

Head coach

- Dennis Erickson

Coordinators/assistant coaches

Legend

- (C) Team captain
- (S) Suspended
- (I) Ineligible
- Injured
- Redshirt

Roster

== Awards and honors ==
- Warren Sapp, Chuck Bednarik Award
- Warren Sapp, Lombardi Award
- Warren Sapp, Bronko Nagurski Award
- Warren Sapp, First-team All-Big East
- Warren Sapp, Consensus First-team All-American
- Warren Sapp, Big East Defensive Player of the Year

=== Jack Harding University of Miami MVP Award ===
- Warren Sapp, DT

== Statistics ==
=== Passing ===
Player	Cmp	Att	Pct	Yards	TD	INT
Frank Costa	168	313	53.7	2,443	15	15
Ryan Collins	23	45	51.1	266	3	5
Ryan Clement	3	7	42.9	20	0	0
Lamont Cain	0	1	0.0	0	0	0

=== Rushing ===
Player	Att	Yards	Avg	TD
James Stewart	147	724	4.9	12
Larry Jones	88	409	4.6	4
Danyell Ferguson	74	405	5.5	5
Al Shipman	45	454	10.1	2
Frank Costa	43	-71	-1.7	0
Tony Gaiter	15	61	4.1	0
Ryan Collins	15	18	1.2	0
Derrick Harris	4	3	0.8	1
Jonathan Harris	3	10	3.3	0
Jammi German	2	3	1.5	0
Mike Crissy	2	-29	-14.5	0
Trent Jones	1	13	13.0	1
Lamont Cain	1	5	5.0	0

=== Receiving ===
Player	Rec	Yards	Avg	TD
Chris T. Jones	39	664	17.0	6
Jammi German	33	391	11.8	2
Jonathan Harris	25	327	13.1	2
A.C. Tellison	16	208	13.0	0
Trent Jones	15	275	18.3	3
Yatil Green	15	255	17.0	4
Syii Tucker	9	150	16.7	0
Gerard Daphnis	9	149	16.6	0
James Stewart	8	44	5.5	0
Al Shipman	5	23	4.6	0
Taj Johnson	5	110	22.0	0
Marcus Wimberly	5	34	6.8	0
Danyell Ferguson	3	16	5.3	0
Lamont Cain	2	49	24.5	0
Larry Jones	1	4	4.0	0
Tony Gaiter	1	3	3.0	0
Derrick Harris	1	1	1.0	1
Chris C. Jones	1	23	23.0	0
Jermaine Chambers	1	6	6.0	0

== 1995 NFL draft ==
Player	Position	Round	Pick	NFL club
Warren Sapp	Defensive tackle	1st	12	Tampa Bay Buccaneers
Pat Riley	Defensive end	2nd	52	Chicago Bears
Chris T. Jones	Wide receiver	3rd	78	Philadelphia Eagles
Larry Jones	Running back	4th	103	Washington Redskins
James Stewart	Running back	5th	157	Minnesota Vikings
C.J. Richardson	Safety	7th	211	Houston Oilers
A.C. Tellison	Wide receiver	7th	231	Cleveland Browns

== Notes ==
- Dwayne Johnson went on to pursue a wrestling career under the ring name The Rock.
