= Damon Huard =

American football player (born 1973)

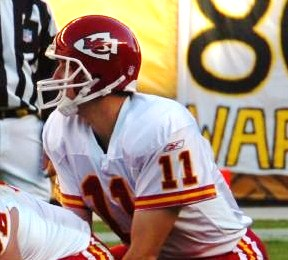
- Huard with the Kansas City Chiefs in 2006

No. 11, 19
- Position: Quarterback

Personal information
- Born: July 9, 1973 (age 53); Yakima, Washington, U.S.
- Listed height: 6 ft 3 in (1.91 m)
- Listed weight: 218 lb (99 kg)

Career information
- High school: Puyallup (Puyallup, Washington)
- College: Washington (1991–1995)
- NFL draft: 1996: undrafted

Career history
- Cincinnati Bengals (1996)*; Miami Dolphins (1997–2000); Frankfurt Galaxy (1998); New England Patriots (2001–2003); Kansas City Chiefs (2004–2008); San Francisco 49ers (2009)*
- * Offseason or practice squad member only

Awards and highlights
- 2× Super Bowl champion (XXXVI, XXXVIII); National champion (1991)

Career NFL statistics
- Passing attempts: 946
- Passing completions: 574
- Completion percentage: 60.7%
- TD–INT: 33–26
- Passing yards: 6,303
- Passer rating: 80.6
- Stats at Pro Football Reference

Damon Paul Huard (born July 9, 1973) is an American former professional football player who was a quarterback in the National Football League (NFL). He is the director of community relations and fundraising for the University of Washington football program, his alma mater.

Huard was signed by the Cincinnati Bengals as an undrafted free agent in 1996, and played 12 seasons in the NFL with the Miami Dolphins, New England Patriots, and Kansas City Chiefs. While with the Patriots, he won two Super Bowl rings as a backup.

== Early life ==
Born in Yakima, Washington, Huard grew up southeast of Tacoma in Puyallup, where his father Mike Huard, was a high school teacher and the head football coach. He was the first player to hold a snap for kicker Ryan Longwell when they played for Aylen Junior High in Puyallup.

Damon Huard attended Puyallup High School, where he was a letterman for the Vikings in football and basketball. He played tight end as a sophomore, as the quarterback was senior Billy Joe Hobert who later was an NFL quarterback. As a senior in 1990, Huard was named the Powerade State Player of the Year winning All-America honors.

== College career ==
After graduating from high school, Huard attended the University of Washington in Seattle, where he redshirted in 1991, the Huskies' national championship season. Wearing jersey number 7, he started for the first time in 1993 under first-year head coach Jim Lambright, and continued as a starter through 1995. For the season, he passed for 2,415 yards and 11 touchdowns; he finished his career as the Huskies' all-time passing leader with 5,692 yards.

As a junior in 1994, Huard led the Huskies to an 18-point victory over the Miami Hurricanes at the Orange Bowl in Miami, halting their nine-year home winning streak at 58 games.

== Professional career ==
=== Cincinnati Bengals ===
After going undrafted in the 1996 NFL draft, Huard was signed by the Cincinnati Bengals as an undrafted free agent, but was waived on August 19.

=== Miami Dolphins ===
After spending the 1996 season out of football, Huard signed with the Miami Dolphins on April 24, 1997. He was released during final cuts on August 24, but was re-signed to the team's practice squad two days later. He was promoted to the active roster on September 6 and spent the remainder of the season as the Dolphins' third quarterback. After the season, Huard played in NFL Europe for the Frankfurt Galaxy. In 1998, Huard played in two games for the Dolphins as a reserve, while acting as the team's third quarterback in eight games. He finished the season six-of-nine for 85 yards and an interception.

Huard began the 1999 season as the Dolphins' holder on the field goal unit, but after an injury to starter Dan Marino, in the future Hall of Famer's final season, Huard started his first NFL game on October 24 after replacing Marino on October 17. He won his first three games that he started, tying a Dolphins record set by Earl Morrall in 1972. Huard posted a 4–1 record before Marino returned in November, finishing the regular season with eight touchdowns, four interceptions, and 1,288 passing yards. Huard also played in the playoffs, replacing Marino for the second half of a 62–7 loss to the Jacksonville Jaguars. Several weeks earlier on December 3, he signed a two-year contract extension with the Dolphins.

Despite Huard's performance in 1999, Jay Fiedler was signed to be the Dolphins' starter in 2000. Huard started a game in Fiedler's place, a 17–14 win over the Colts on November 26, 2000. On the same day, Damon and his brother Brock became the NFL's first set of brothers to start at quarterback on the same weekend in league history. Damon made his only start that year against the Colts, while Brock started against the Denver Broncos for the Seahawks.

=== New England Patriots ===
A free agent after the 2000 season, Huard signed with the New England Patriots. At training camp, he competed with second-year Tom Brady and third-year Michael Bishop for the backup job behind long-time starter Drew Bledsoe; In 2001 Brady became the team's second quarterback and Huard the third for the start of the season. When Bledsoe was injured in Week 2, Brady became the Patriots' starter for the remainder of the season, while Huard was the backup until Bledsoe returned in Week 10. As the third quarterback, Huard won his first Super Bowl ring in February 2002 when the Patriots beat the St. Louis Rams.

Huard appeared in his first game as a Patriot in 2002, leading a touchdown drive in a blowout win over the New York Jets on September 15. Later in the season, he entered a game in a punt formation and ran a successful quarterback sneak for a first down. While a backup for the Patriots in 2003, Huard played in two games and was on the team's scout team during practices. Before the AFC Championship game against the Indianapolis Colts, he mimicked the line calls and audibles of Colts quarterback Peyton Manning for the Patriots' defense during practice.

=== Kansas City Chiefs ===
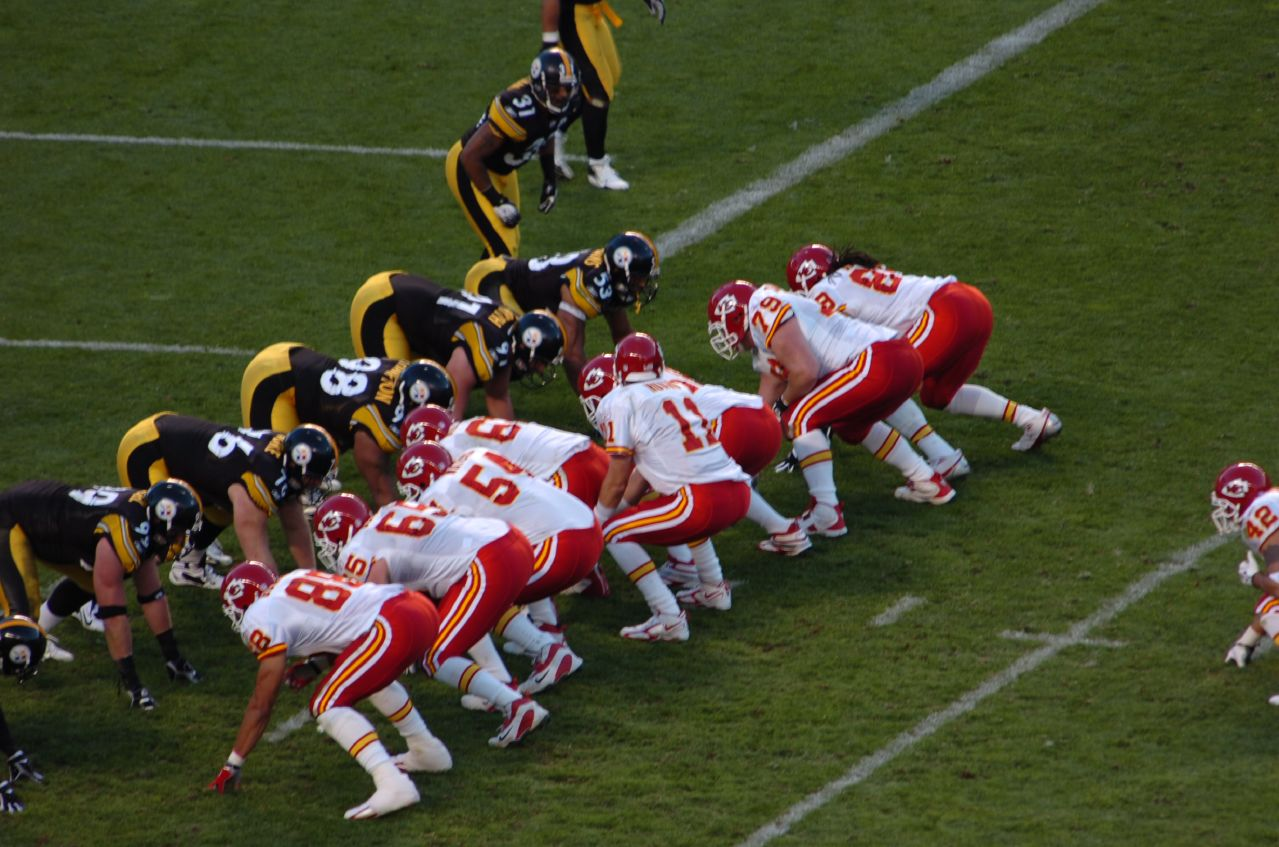
Leading the Chiefs against the Pittsburgh Steelers in 2006

After 2003, Huard signed with the Kansas City Chiefs as a free agent. As the team's third quarterback, he did not see any action for his first two seasons (2004 and 2005). In the 2006 opener, starter Trent Green suffered a concussion and was replaced by Huard. He started the next seven games, posting a 5–3 record until suffering a groin injury. Green returned and started the remainder of the season and the team's playoff game against the Indianapolis Colts.

After the season, the Chiefs signed Huard to a three-year contract extension, and Green was traded to the Miami Dolphins. During the 2006 season, Huard set the NFL record for lowest percentage passes intercepted in a season among qualified players, with only one of his 244 attempts being intercepted.

In the Chiefs' 2007 training camp, Huard competed with second-year Brodie Croyle, the team's third-round draft choice in 2006. Huard was named the starter on August 25, and started the first nine games of the season, going 4–5. In his final start, Huard suffered a back injury and was replaced by Croyle, but Croyle himself was injured after his second start, both losses, and Huard returned as the starter in Week 13. He suffered a hand injury in the game and Croyle started the Chiefs' next two games. In Week 16, Croyle was injured again and Huard had the opportunity to play as a reserve before Croyle returned to start the last game of the season. The Chiefs ended the season with a nine-game losing streak.

Croyle started the opener in 2008, but again suffered an injury and was replaced by Huard. In Week 2, Huard started but suffered a concussion and was replaced by Tyler Thigpen, a seventh-round draft pick in 2007. Thigpen started the Chiefs' Week 3 game before Huard returned for Weeks 4 and 5. Croyle returned after the bye week in Week 7 to start, was injured again, and replaced by Huard, who suffered a thumb injury. He was placed on injured reserve the next week, ending his season. The same week, Croyle was also placed on injured reserve, leaving Thigpen as the Chiefs' starter for the remainder of the season.

After the season, Scott Pioli, the Patriots' director of player personnel during Huard's time in New England, was hired to be the Chiefs' general manager. Huard was released by the Chiefs on February 24, roughly a week before Pioli traded for Matt Cassel, a Patriots backup who replaced an injured Brady in 2008, to be the Chiefs' starter in 2009.

=== San Francisco 49ers ===
Huard signed with the San Francisco 49ers on March 4, 2009, and competed for a quarterback job behind Alex Smith and also with Shaun Hill and 2009 fifth-round pick Nate Davis; Huard was released on September 1, and retired.

== After football ==
The University of Washington announced in June 2013 that Huard had taken a new role as chief administrative officer of the football program. He had been a fundraiser for the previous three seasons in the athletic department. Under new head coach Chris Petersen, Huard became director of external relations.

From 2010–2019 he was the analyst on Husky radio broadcasts, alongside Bob Rondeau and later Tony Castricone. Huard and former Miami Dolphins teammate and quarterback Dan Marino have a winemaking venture in Woodinville, Washington called "Passing Time."

== Personal life ==
Huard and his wife Julie Ann have three children. His younger brothers were also quarterbacks at Puyallup High School: Brock also started at the University of Washington and in the NFL (with the Seattle Seahawks and the Indianapolis Colts) and Luke played at North Carolina.

His son, Sam Huard, plays quarterback at the University of Southern California in Los Angeles and previously attended Washington, Cal Poly, and Utah. Sam started his first game in the 2021 Apple Cup.

== See also ==
- Washington Huskies football statistical leaders
