= Frank Costa (American football) =

American football player (born 1972)

No. 11
- Position: Quarterback

Personal information
- Born: September 8, 1972 (age 54); Philadelphia, Pennsylvania, U.S.
- Listed height: 6 ft 4 in (1.93 m)
- Listed weight: 200 lb (91 kg)

Career information
- High school: St. Joseph's Preparatory School (Philadelphia)
- College: Miami (FL) (1991–1994)

Awards and highlights
- National champion (1991)

Frank Costa (born September 8, 1972) is an American former football quarterback. He played college football for the Miami Hurricanes from 1991 to 1994.

== Biography ==
Costa played several sports at St. Joseph's Preparatory School in Philadelphia. When he graduated from high school, he held virtually every passing record in the city's history including completions in a game (27), season (196), and career (373); as well as yards passing in a season (2547) and career (4760); and touchdowns in a season (24) and career (35). The Philadelphia Inquirer named Costa as the quarterback on their all-decade high school team for the 1980s. After being recruited nationally, he chose to play football at the University of Miami in Coral Gables, Florida.

In his first two seasons with the Hurricanes, Costa was a backup quarterback, behind starter Gino Torretta. In his final two seasons, Costa was the starter for most of Miami's games, including a memorable win against rival Florida State on October 8, 1994. The 1994 Hurricanes reached the Bowl Coalition's championship game for that season, the 1995 Orange Bowl, where Costa passed for 248 yards (18-for-35) with two touchdowns and one interception, as Miami lost to Nebraska, 24–17. Costa finished his college career with a record of 19–3 as a starter; he appeared in a total of 34 games for the Hurricanes, passing for 4256 yards and 22 touchdowns.

Costa was not selected in the 1995 NFL draft. He had tryouts with the Cleveland Browns, Miami Dolphins, and Philadelphia Eagles, but did not make an NFL roster. Costa played two seasons with the London Monarchs of the World League of American Football, and then one season for the Mobile Admirals of the short-lived Regional Football League (RFL). Costa was the winning quarterback of the league's only championship game, played in June 1999.

After the Regional Football League ceased operation, Costa moved back to the Philadelphia area and became a financial adviser.
