= Ron Winter =

American football official (born 1946)

- Born: February 6, 1946 (age 80); Kalkaska, Michigan, U.S.
- Occupation: NFL official (1995–2013)

Ronald J. Winter (born February 6, 1946) is a former American football official who officiated in the National Football League (NFL) from the 1995 through 2013 seasons. Winter previously served as a football official for the National Collegiate Athletic Association (NCAA).

Winter wore uniform No. 14 (previously No. 82, 1995–1997). His 2013 NFL officiating crew consisted of umpire Carl Paganelli, head linesman Jim Howey, line judge Gary Arthur, field judge Scott Steenson, side judge Tom Hill, and back judge Greg Steed. He was the alternate referee for Super Bowl XLIII.

Winter was one of the first NFL referees to wear eyeglasses on the field. Fred Silva was the first wearing glasses in 1988.

== Personal ==
Winter was a physical education professor at Western Michigan University in Kalamazoo, Michigan. He retired at the end of the 2007–08 school year after having served for more than 38 years.

== Officiating career ==
=== College career ===
Winter was a referee in the Big Ten Conference. His final game as a collegiate official was the 1995 Orange Bowl, when Nebraska defeated Miami 24–17 concluding a 13–0 season and winning a national championship. It was the first national championship for Cornhuskers coach Tom Osborne after 22 seasons as the coach.

=== NFL career ===
He entered the NFL as a line judge in 1995, and later was promoted to referee in 1998 after Dale Hamer returned to the head linesman position and Gary Lane returned to the side judge position.

In his first playoff assignment as a referee, Winter refereed the New York Giants and San Francisco 49ers Wild Card playoff game in January 2003. During the game back judge Scott Green did not realize that New York's Rich Seubert had lined up legally in a receiver's spot and failed to call a defensive pass interference foul against him during a failed field goal attempt, instead penalizing him for ineligible receiver downfield. Commissioner Paul Tagliabue described the situation as the most disappointing officiating blunder he had seen in his years as NFL commissioner and announced there would be changes in the officiating of field goal attempts and during the last plays of games.

=== Retirement ===
Winter announced his retirement on April 3, 2014.
