= Jamie Silva =

American football player (born 1984)

No. 40
- Position: Safety

Personal information
- Born: December 14, 1984 (age 41); East Providence, Rhode Island, U.S.
- Listed height: 5 ft 11 in (1.80 m)
- Listed weight: 204 lb (93 kg)

Career information
- High school: East Providence
- College: Boston College
- NFL draft: 2008: undrafted

Career history
- Indianapolis Colts (2008–2010)

Awards and highlights
- Consensus All-American (2007); First-team All-ACC (2007); Champs Sports Bowl MVP (2007)

Career NFL statistics
- Total tackles: 48
- Fumble recoveries: 1
- Pass deflections: 2
- Stats at Pro Football Reference

James J. Silva (born December 14, 1984) is an American former professional football player who was a safety for the Indianapolis Colts of the National Football League (NFL). He played college football for the Boston College Eagles, earning consensus All-American honors in 2007. He was signed by the Colts as an undrafted free agent in 2008.

== Early life ==
Silva was born in East Providence, Rhode Island. He attended East Providence High School, and was a standout high school football player for the East Providence Townies.

== College career ==
Silva attended Boston College, where he played for the Boston College Eagles from 2003 to 2007. He redshirted as a true freshman in 2003. As a senior in 2007, Silva recorded 125 tackles (82 unassisted) and eight interceptions, being the only player in NCAA history to ever accomplish this. For this, he was named a consensus first-team All-American selection, as well as one of three finalists for the Jim Thorpe Award, given annually to the nation's top defensive back. He was also named the most valuable player of the 2007 Champs Sports Bowl, in which the Eagles defeated the Michigan State Spartans 24–21; Silva gained 10 tackles and two interceptions. He played in the 2008 East/West Shrine game and was voted captain by his teammates. He majored in communications.

== Professional career ==
Silva went undrafted in the 2008 NFL draft and was signed by the Indianapolis Colts as an undrafted free agent on May 2. He recorded seventeen tackles during the 2008 season.

Silva was a member of the 2009 Indianapolis Colts. He served as a special team specialist as well as the second-string free safety. Silva recorded 32 tackles and deflected two passes in his second season, as well as four postseason tackles. Silva and the Colts advanced to Super Bowl XLIV, where they faced the New Orleans Saints. The Colts were defeated 31–17.

During the first preseason game of 2010, Silva sustained a torn ACL, MCL and crushed knee joint, causing him to miss the rest of the year. Doctors never cleared Silva to play again.

On July 26, 2011, the Colts surrendered the rights to Silva, making him an unrestricted free agent.

== Personal life ==
Silva and his wife Theresa reside in Pittsburgh, Pennsylvania. They have four daughters and a son. Silva was an assistant coach on the Mt. Lebanon High School football team in the fall of 2016. He is also a cousin of USA Women's Hockey player Kacey Bellamy.
