= 1996 Carquest Bowl =

American college football game

Miami Hurricanes	Virginia Cavaliers
(8–3)	(7–4)
Big East	ACC
31	21
Head coach: Butch Davis	Head coach: George Welsh
AP / Coaches / BA; 19 / 19 / 19
	1	2	3	4	Total
Miami	14	10	0	7	31
Virginia	7	0	7	7	21
- Date: December 27, 1996
- Season: 1996
- Stadium: Pro Player Stadium
- Location: Miami Gardens, Florida
- MVP: SS Tremain Mack (Miami)
- Referee: Bill Goss (SEC)
- Attendance: 46,418

United States TV coverage
- Network: TBS (Bob Neal, Mark May)

The 1996 Carquest Bowl was the final game of the 1996 NCAA Division I-A football season for the Miami Hurricanes and the Virginia Cavaliers.

== Background ==
The Hurricanes were co-champion (along with Virginia Tech) of the Big East Conference for the third straight season (second under Davis), but playing in a bowl game for the first time since the 1995 Orange Bowl due to a scandal that had made them ineligible the season before. The Cavaliers had finished 4th in the Atlantic Coast Conference after three losses by an average of 7 points and a late Virginia Tech (who had beaten Miami) loss knocked them out of the Top 25. This was Virginia's 2nd appearance and Miami's first in this bowl game, as Virginia had appeared in 1994.

== Game summary ==
Despite outrushing the Hurricanes and having less penalties than them, Virginia was beset by injuries to quarterback Tim Sherman (who only went 3 of 10 for 27 yards before his arm injury) and tailback Tiki Barber (who had only 14 yards on 7 carries) early in the game. Yatil Green caught a touchdown pass from Ryan Clement early in the first quarter and Tremain Mack recovered a fumble and returned it 79 yards for a touchdown to give Miami a 14–0 lead with 4:47 left in the first. But Virginia responded :39 seconds later with an Germane Crowell touchdown catch from Aaron Brooks to narrow the lead. Andy Crosland made it 17–7 early in the 2nd with a field goal, his only of the day. Late in the quarter, Virginia was driving when Mack returned a Brooks pass 42 yards for a touchdown, giving them a commanding 24–7 lead going into halftime. Brooks had a touchdown run late in the 3rd quarter to narrow it to 24–10. The Cavaliers tried to make it a one possession game with Rafael Garcia's field goal attempt, but Mack blocked the kick and a few plays later, Trent Jones made it 31–10 with a touchdown run. Virginia could only respond with a Thomas Jones touchdown run, but by that point there was only 7:74 left. aThis was Miami's first bowl win since the 1992 Orange Bowl.

== Aftermath ==
The Cavaliers would not win a bowl game in Welsh's four remaining years, and would not win one until 2002, with Al Groh as coach. The Hurricanes would return to the bowl game two years later, this time known as the MicronPC Bowl, in 1998.

== Statistics ==
Statistics	Miami	Virginia
First downs	14	20
Yards rushing	60	155
Yards passing	274	169
Return yards	121	45
Total yards	455	369
Punts-Average	5-33.8	5-37.4
Fumbles-Lost	4-2	2–1
Penalties-Yards	7-70	3-35
Time of possession	29:41	30:19
