= 2007 Champs Sports Bowl =

American college football game

Michigan State Spartans	Boston College Eagles
(7–5)	(10–3)
Big Ten	ACC
21	24
Head coach: Mark Dantonio	Head coach: Jeff Jagodzinski
	AP / Coaches / BCS; 14 / 14 / 14
	1	2	3	4	Total
Michigan State	7	3	3	8	21
Boston College	7	7	3	7	24
- Date: December 28, 2007
- Season: 2007
- Stadium: Florida Citrus Bowl
- Location: Orlando, Florida
- MVP: FS Jamie Silva (Boston College)
- Favorite: Boston College by 3½
- Referee: Randy Christal (Big 12)
- Attendance: 46,554

International TV coverage
- Network: ESPN
- Announcers: Mike Patrick, Todd Blackledge, and Holly Rowe

The 2007 Champs Sports Bowl was the 18th edition of the college football bowl game. It was part of the 2007-08 NCAA football bowl games season, and was played on December 28, 2007, at the Citrus Bowl stadium in Orlando, Florida. The game pitted the Michigan State Spartans of the Big Ten Conference against the Boston College Eagles of the Atlantic Coast Conference.

== Background ==
In Mark Dantonio's first season with Michigan State, he led them to their first winning season since 2003. They won their first four games of the season, but went 1–5 to begin conference play, before wins over Purdue and #22 Penn State righted the ship, though they finished tied for 5th with Purdue and Indiana in the Big Ten Conference. This was the fourth bowl game of the decade for the Spartans. Boston College won their first eight games of the season while rising from unranked to #2 in the polls before a match-up with Florida State. A 27–17 loss dropped them to #8 and a loss to Maryland the following week dropped them to #17, though they won their last two games (against #20 Clemson and Miami) to win the Atlantic Division of the Atlantic Coast Conference. In the ACC Championship Game, they faced off against #5 Virginia Tech, who beat them 30–16. This was the eighth bowl game of the decade for the Eagles.

== Game summary ==
- Michigan State - Kellen Davis 18-yard pass from Brian Hoyer (Brett Swenson kick)
- Boston College - Jon Loyte 1-yard pass from Matt Ryan (Steve Aponavicius kick)
- Boston College - Rich Gunnell 29-yard pass from Matt Ryan (Steve Aponavicius kick)
- Michigan State - Brett Swenson 39-yard field goal
- Michigan State - Brett Swenson 23-yard field goal
- Boston College - Steve Aponavicius 28-yard field goal
- Boston College - Rich Gunnell 68-yard pass from Matt Ryan (Steve Aponavicius kick)
- Michigan State - Deon Curry 14-yard pass from Brian Hoyer (Kellen Davis 2-point pass)

Jamie Silva had 10 tackles, 7 solo while also having 2 interceptions and 4 punt returns for 37 yards en route to being named MVP.

== Aftermath ==
Michigan State began a streak of 9 straight bowl appearances under Mark Dantonio (the longest streak in school history) while the Eagles went to two more bowls game in the decade.

Both quarterbacks went on to lengthy NFL careers.
