= 1998 MicronPC Bowl =

American college football game

Miami Hurricanes	NC State Wolfpack
(8–3)	(7–4)
Big East	ACC
46	23
Head coach: Butch Davis	Head coach: Mike O'Cain
AP / Coaches / BCS; 24 / 21 / NR
	1	2	3	4	Total
Miami	14	13	3	16	46
NC State	7	3	7	6	23
- Date: December 29, 1998
- Season: 1998
- Stadium: Pro Player Stadium
- Location: Miami Gardens, Florida
- MVP: QB Scott Covington (Miami)
- Referee: Randy Sims (C-USA)
- Attendance: 44,387

United States TV coverage
- Network: TBS
- Announcers: TV: Kevin Harlan (play-by-play), Mark May (analyst)

The 1998 MicronPC Bowl was an American college football bowl game that was played on December 29, 1998, at Pro Player Stadium in Miami Gardens, Florida. The game matched the Miami Hurricanes against the North Carolina State Wolfpack. The game began at 7:35 p.m. EST and aired on TBS. It was the final contest of the 1998 NCAA Division I-A football season for both teams, and ended in a 46–23 victory for Miami. This was the ninth edition of what was originally the Blockbuster Bowl, and first edition (of three) sponsored by MicronPC.

== Game summary ==
=== Scoring summary ===
Scoring summary

Quarter	Time	Drive			Team	Scoring information	Score	
Quarter	Time	Plays	Yards	TOP	Team	Scoring information	Miami	NC State
1	11:34	9	71	3:26	Miami	Andre King 4-yard touchdown reception from Scott Covington, Andy Crosland kick good	7	0
1	5:58	12	84	5:36	NC State	Jamie Barnette 1-yard touchdown run, Danny Deskevich kick good	7	7
1	3:15	7	71	2:43	Miami	Edgerrin James 5-yard touchdown run, Crosland kick good	14	7
2	12:49	1	80	0:11	Miami	Santana Moss 80-yard touchdown reception from Covington, Crosland kick no good (blocked)	20	7
2	1:37	15	69	6:49	NC State	28-yard field goal by Deskevich	20	10
2	0:43	6	77	0:54	Miami	James 2-yard touchdown run, Crosland kick good	27	10
3	10:05	7	47	2:39	Miami	31-yard field goal by Crosland	30	10
3	5:03	3	71	0:24	NC State	Rahshon Spikes 30-yard touchdown run, Deskevich kick good	30	17
4	14:33	6	83	2:35	Miami	James Jackson 13-yard touchdown run, 2-point pass failed	36	17
4	12:08	3	45	0:47	Miami	Jackson 25-yard touchdown run, Crosland kick good	43	17
4	7:03	12	79	5:05	NC State	Chris Coleman 7-yard touchdown reception from Barnette, 2-point run failed	43	23
4	2:05	4	2	3:35	Miami	29-yard field goal by Jorge Gaitan	46	23
"TOP" = time of possession. For other American football terms, see Glossary of American football.							Miami	NC State

=== Statistics ===
Statistics	MIA	NCSU
First downs	27	31
Plays–yards	65-594	84–498
Rushes–yards	38-269	40–297
Passing yards	325	201
Passing: Comp–Att–Int	18-27-0	22–44–5
Time of possession	29:07	30:53
