= 1993 Sugar Bowl =

1993 USF&G Insurance Sugar Bowl
- Bowl Coalition National Championship Game; 59th Sugar Bowl
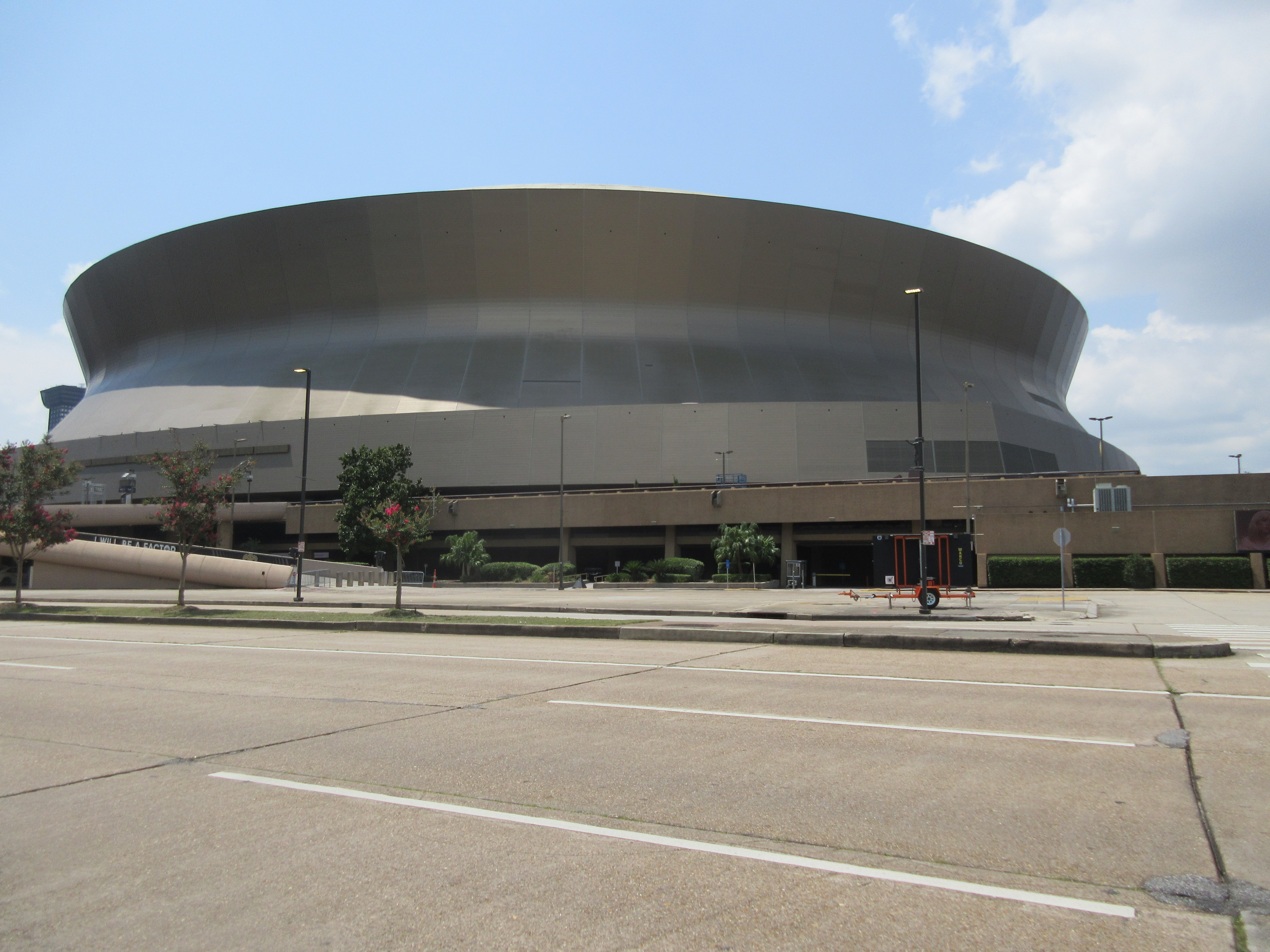
- The Louisiana Superdome in New Orleans, Louisiana, hosted the Sugar Bowl.
Miami Hurricanes	Alabama Crimson Tide
(11–0)	(12–0)
Big East	SEC
13	34
Head coach: Dennis Erickson	Head coach: Gene Stallings
AP / Coaches / BC; 1 / 1 / 1	AP / Coaches / BC; 2 / 2 / 2
	1	2	3	4	Total
Miami	3	3	0	7	13
Alabama	3	10	14	7	34
- Date: January 1, 1993
- Season: 1992
- Stadium: Louisiana Superdome
- Location: New Orleans, Louisiana
- MVP: Alabama RB Derrick Lassic
- Favorite: Miami by 8 points (36)
- Referee: Rogers Redding (SWC)
- Attendance: 76,789

United States TV coverage
- Network: ABC
- Announcers: Keith Jackson, Bob Griese and Jack Arute

The 1993 Sugar Bowl took place on January 1, 1993, in the Louisiana Superdome in New Orleans, Louisiana. It was the final game of the 1992 college football season and served as the first national championship game selected by the Bowl Coalition, predecessor to the Bowl Alliance, Bowl Championship Series (BCS), and later the College Football Playoff (CFP). The game featured two unbeaten teams in the Alabama Crimson Tide and the Miami Hurricanes. Alabama defeated Miami, 34–13, to finish the season 13–0 and lay claim to the 12th national championship in program history. It was Alabama's first national championship since 1979, and their last until 2009.

== Teams ==
=== Miami Hurricanes ===
Miami, out of the Big East conference, was led by Heisman Trophy-winning quarterback Gino Torretta, and was playing for back-to-back undefeated seasons and consecutive National Championships.

=== Alabama Crimson Tide ===
Alabama also entered the matchup undefeated, following their 28–21 victory over the Florida Gators in the inaugural SEC Championship Game.

== Game summary ==
This was the inaugural season of the Bowl Coalition, which was intended to ensure that the national championship would be decided on the field. Its formula worked as intended, forcing the first bowl matchup between the consensus #1 and #2 teams in the nation since the end of the 1987 season. As Big East champion, #1 Miami was not contractually obligated to a bowl. The Hurricanes were thus free to face #2 Alabama in the Sugar Bowl, which the Crimson Tide hosted as SEC champion.

Miami was heavily favored and came into the game on a 29-game winning streak; the Hurricanes had not lost since a 29–20 loss to Notre Dame in 1990. Alabama's defense held the Hurricanes to just 13 points, intercepting Torretta three times, en route to a consensus national championship. Alabama rushed for 267 yards—67 more yards than the Hurricanes had allowed all season. At one point, the Tide lined up all eleven players on the line of scrimmage. The confused Torretta was picked off by George Teague, who returned it for a touchdown.

A legendary play in Alabama football lore, known as "The Strip", occurred when Miami wide receiver Lamar Thomas caught a deep pass from Torretta and was sprinting for what seemed like an 89-yard touchdown. However, Teague caught Thomas from behind, stripped the ball from him, and started running the other way before being tackled. The play became famous following Thomas's pre-game comments regarding the SEC, the superiority of the Miami receiving corps, and the manhood of the Alabama defensive backs. While the play was negated by an Alabama offside penalty, it still ultimately prevented a Miami touchdown, as Miami would have simply declined the penalty had the strip not taken place.

Torretta threw three interceptions after only throwing four in the entire season. It drew parallels to Vinny Testaverde's five-interception performance in the 1987 Fiesta Bowl. Following the poor performance, some reporters began to question whether Torretta deserved the Heisman.

The Crimson Tide's victory meant not only their 12th national championship but also the first since legendary coach Paul "Bear" Bryant died in 1983 less than five weeks after coaching his last game. Alabama's coach Gene Stallings was one of the Junction Boys, the group of Texas A&M players who endured Bryant's punishing 1954 summer camp. It would be the school's last national football championship until Nick Saban's first as Alabama head coach in 2009.

=== Scoring summary ===
Quarter	Time	Team	Scoring Information	Score	
Quarter	Time	Team	Scoring Information	Alabama	Miami
1	10:56	Alabama	19–yard field goal by Michael Proctor	3	0
1	7:49	Miami	49–yard field goal by Dane Prewitt	3	3
2	10:48	Alabama	23–yard field goal by Michael Proctor	6	3
2	6:09	Alabama	Sherman Williams 2–yard touchdown run, Michael Proctor kick good	13	3
2	0:00	Miami	42–yard field goal by Dane Prewitt	13	6
3	10:12	Alabama	Derrick Lassic 1–yard touchdown run, Michael Proctor kick good	20	6
3	9:56	Alabama	George Teague 31–yard interception return for touchdown, Michael Proctor kick good	27	6
4	12:08	Miami	Kevin Williams 78–yard punt return for touchdown, Dane Prewitt kick good	27	13
4	6:46	Alabama	Derrick Lassic 4–yard touchdown run, Michael Proctor kick good	34	13
Final Score				34	13
