= 1994 Fiesta Bowl =

1994 IBM OS/2 Fiesta Bowl
- 23rd Fiesta Bowl
| Miami Hurricanes | Arizona Wildcats |
| (9–2) | (9–2) |
| Big East | Pac-10 |
| 0 | 29 |
| Head coach: Dennis Erickson | Head coach: Dick Tomey |
| AP / Coaches / BC; 10 / 9 / 10 | AP / Coaches / BC; 16 / 14 / 16 |
| | 1 | 2 | 3 | 4 | Total |
|---|---|---|---|---|---|
| Miami | 0 | 0 | 0 | 0 | 0 |
| Arizona | 9 | 7 | 6 | 7 | 29 |
- Date: January 1, 1994
- Season: 1993
- Stadium: Sun Devil Stadium
- Location: Tempe, Arizona
- MVP: RB Chuck Levy & LB Tedy Bruschi
- Referee: Dayle Phillips (ACC)
- Attendance: 72,260

United States TV coverage
- Network: NBC
- Announcers: Tom Hammond, Cris Collinsworth
- Nielsen ratings: 7.9

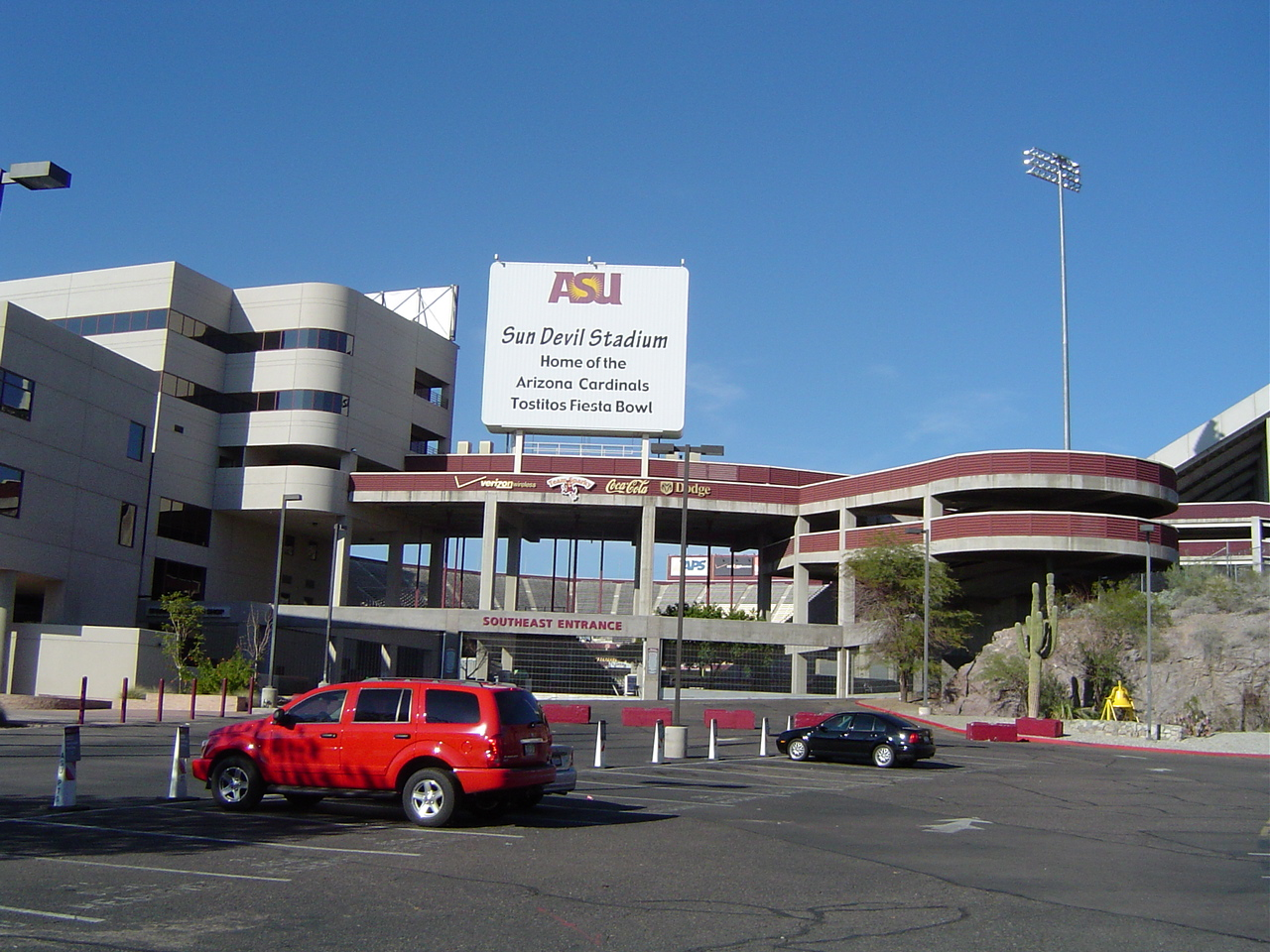
Sun Devil Stadium in Tempe, Arizona, hosted the Fiesta Bowl.

The 1994 Fiesta Bowl, played on January 1, 1994, was the 23rd edition of the Fiesta Bowl. The game featured the Arizona Wildcats, and the Miami Hurricanes. The game featured the first shutout in Fiesta Bowl history, as Arizona shut-out Miami, 29–0. The shutout loss was the first for Miami in 168 games, since they lost 30–0 to Alabama on November 17, 1979.

The scoring started with Dan White throwing a 13-yard touchdown pass to Troy Dickey. The ensuing extra point failed, and Arizona settled for a 6–0 lead. Kicker Steve McLaughlin kicked a 39-yard field goal to increase the lead to 9–0, at the end of the 1st quarter. Late in the second quarter, running back Chuck Levy scored on a 68-yard touchdown run to increase the lead to 16–0.

In the third quarter, McLaughlin added two field goals of 31 and 21 yards respectively, as the Wildcats opened up a 22–0 lead. In the 4th quarter, White connected with Dickey again for a 13-yard touchdown, to provide the final margin. Arizona gained revenge for an 8–7 Miami win the previous year, when McLaughlin missed a last second 51-yard field goal.

== Statistics ==
| Statistics | Miami | Arizona |
|---|---|---|
| First downs | 13 | 24 |
| Rushing yards | 35 | 257 |
| Passing yards | 147 | 152 |
| Return yards | 13 | 84 |
| Passes intercepted | 3 | 2 |
| Total offense | 182 | 409 |
| Punts–average | 10–37 | 5–36 |
| Fumbles–lost | 2–1 | 2–0 |
| Penalties–yards | 6–40 | 2–25 |
| Possession time | 22:40 | 37:20 |
