= Whammy in Miami =

- Non-conference game
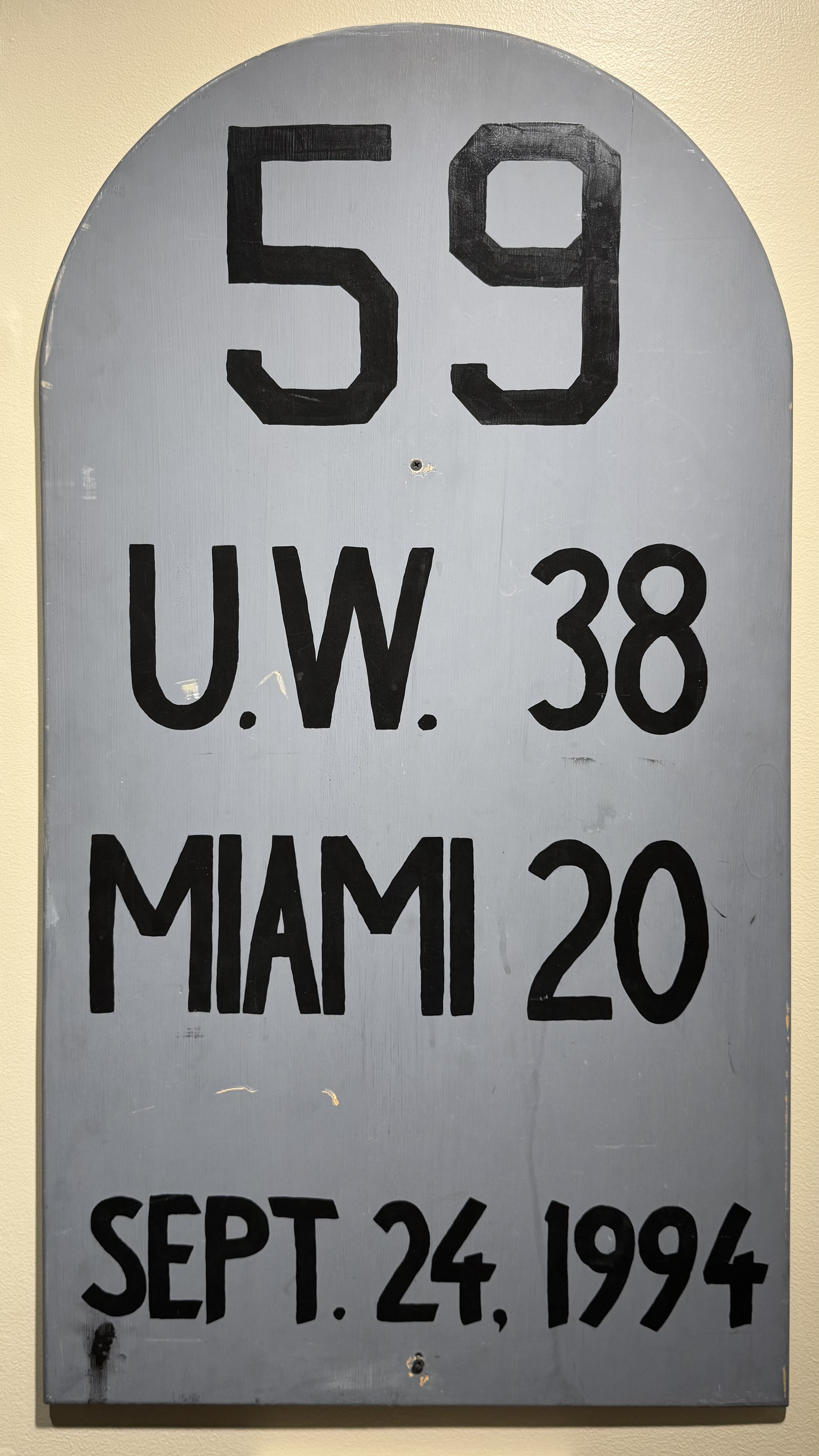
Washington Huskies	Miami Hurricanes
(1–1)	(2–0)
38	20
Head coach: Jim Lambright	Head coach: Dennis Erickson
AP / Coaches; 17 / NR	AP / Coaches; 6 / 6
	1	2	3	4	Total
Washington	0	3	25	10	38
Miami	3	11	3	3	20
- Date: September 24, 1994
- Season: 1994
- Stadium: Orange Bowl
- Location: Miami, Florida

The Whammy in Miami was a college football game between the Miami Hurricanes and Washington Huskies that took place at the Orange Bowl on September 24, 1994.

With their victory, Washington ended Miami's NCAA-record 58-game home-field win streak at the Orange Bowl.
