= Miami–Virginia Tech football rivalry =

American college football rivalry

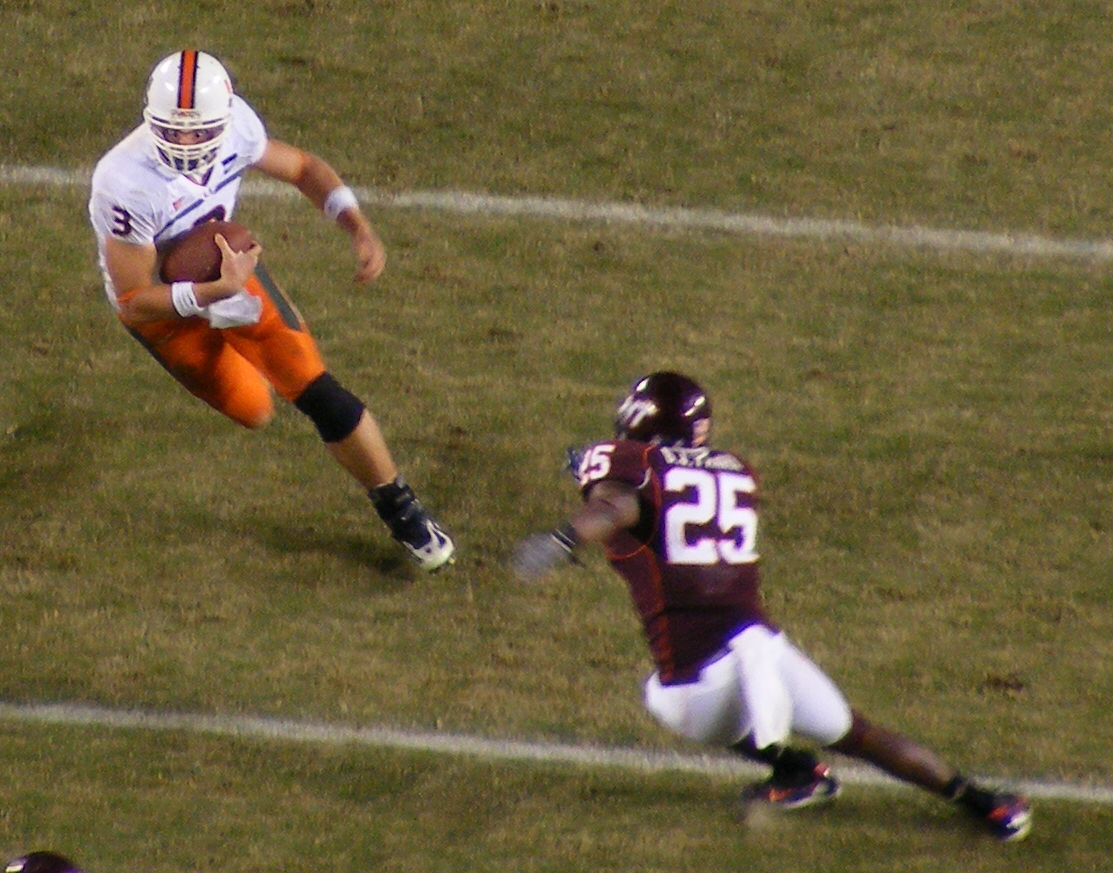
- Miami and Virginia Tech playing each other in 2007.

- Miami Hurricanes Virginia Tech Hokies
- Sport: Football
- First meeting: November 13, 1953; Miami, 26–0
- Latest meeting: November 21, 2026; Miami, 28–20
- Next meeting: 2027

Statistics
- Total meetings: 43
- Most wins: Miami leads, 28–15
- Largest victory: Miami: 26–0 (1953); Virginia Tech: 43–10 (1999)
- Longest win streak: Miami, 12 (1953–1994)
- Current win streak: Miami, 6 (2020–present)

Bowl history
- 1966 Liberty Bowl: Miami, 14–7; 1981 Peach Bowl: Miami, 20–10

The Miami–Virginia Tech football rivalry is an American college football rivalry between the Miami Hurricanes of the University of Miami and Virginia Tech Hokies of Virginia Tech. As of 2026, Miami leads the series 28–15.

== History ==
=== First meeting ===
The Hurricanes and Hokies first met on November 13, 1953, in Miami.

=== Bowl games ===
Miami and Virginia Tech have met in two bowl games, and Miami has won both of them, winning the 1966 Liberty Bowl 14–7 and the 1981 Peach Bowl 20–10.

=== Annual meetings since 1992 ===
The two teams have played annually since 1992. The rivalry began developing when the Hokies became a member of the Big East Conference for football in 1991. When the Atlantic Coast Conference (ACC) expanded in 2004, both Miami and Virginia Tech left the Big East for the ACC. Both teams continue to compete annually as members of the ACC Coastal Division.

The series was largely dominated by Miami until 1995 when Virginia Tech won their first game against Miami in Blacksburg. Since then, the series has been largely even with Virginia Tech winning 15 games and Miami winning 15. Several of the games since 1985 have been notable, including 11 meetings when both teams were ranked in the top 25 and four meetings when both ranked in the top 10.

In 2000, #2 Virginia Tech lost to #3 Miami at the Miami Orange Bowl 41–21.

In 2003, #10 Virginia Tech beat #2 Miami in Lane Stadium 31–7.

In 2004, the first year for both schools in the ACC, the teams met at the Orange Bowl in Miami for the final game of the regular season, which became a de facto ACC championship game with the winner getting a berth in a Bowl Championship Series bowl game. #10 Virginia Tech beat #9 Miami 16–10 in that game.

In 2005, #5 Miami beat #3 Virginia Tech in Blacksburg 27–7.

In 2017, which was the last game that featured both teams meeting while both were ranked, #10 Miami beat #13 Virginia Tech 28–10.

After a one-year hiatus due to the ACC doing away with divisions in 2023, the ACC announced the scheduling model for the next seven years (2024 to 2030 seasons) with the conference now at 17 teams. Miami–Virginia Tech was restored as an annual matchup.

In 2024, on the final play of the game, Virginia Tech's Hail Mary pass was originally ruled a touchdown which would have won the game for them, but after a lengthy review, was controversially overturned. #7 Miami won 38–34.

== Game results ==
Miami victories	Virginia Tech victories

No.	Date	Location	Winner	Score
1	November 13, 1953	Miami, FL	Miami	26–0
2	December 10, 1966	Memphis, TN	#9 Miami	14–7
3	November 4, 1967	Blacksburg, VA	Miami	14–7
4	October 18, 1968	Miami, FL	#12 Miami	13–8
5	November 1, 1974	Miami, FL	Miami	14–7
6	January 2, 1981	Atlanta, GA	#20 Miami	20–10
7	November 14, 1981	Miami, FL	#12 Miami	21–14
8	September 18, 1982	Blacksburg, VA	#15 Miami	14–8
9	November 14, 1987	Miami, FL	#3 Miami	27–13
10	October 24, 1992	Blacksburg, VA	#1 Miami	43–23
11	September 18, 1993	Miami, FL	#3 Miami	21–2
12	October 29, 1994	Miami, FL	#6 Miami	24–3
13	September 23, 1995	Blacksburg, VA	Virginia Tech	13–7
14	November 16, 1996	Miami, FL	#21 Virginia Tech	21–7
15	November 8, 1997	Blacksburg, VA	#20 Virginia Tech	27–25
16	September 19, 1998	Miami, FL	Virginia Tech	27–20^{OT}
17	November 13, 1999	Blacksburg, VA	#2 Virginia Tech	43–10
18	November 4, 2000	Miami, FL	#3 Miami	41–21
19	December 1, 2001	Blacksburg, VA	#1 Miami	26–24
20	December 7, 2002	Miami, FL	#1 Miami	56–45
21	November 1, 2003	Blacksburg, VA	#10 Virginia Tech	31–7
22	December 4, 2004	Miami, FL	#10 Virginia Tech	16–10

No.	Date	Location	Winner	Score
23	November 5, 2005	Blacksburg, VA	#5 Miami	27–7
24	November 4, 2006	Miami, FL	#24 Virginia Tech	17–10
25	November 17, 2007	Blacksburg, VA	#10 Virginia Tech	44–14
26	November 13, 2008	Miami Gardens, FL	Miami	16–14
27	September 26, 2009	Blacksburg, VA	#12 Virginia Tech	31–7
28	November 20, 2010	Miami Gardens, FL	#14 Virginia Tech	31–17
29	October 8, 2011	Blacksburg, VA	#17 Virginia Tech	38–35
30	November 1, 2012	Miami Gardens, FL	Miami	30–12
31	November 9, 2013	Miami Gardens, FL	Virginia Tech	42–24
32	October 23, 2014	Blacksburg, VA	Miami	30–6
33	October 17, 2015	Miami Gardens, FL	Miami	30–20
34	October 20, 2016	Blacksburg, VA	Virginia Tech	37–16
35	November 4, 2017	Miami Gardens, FL	#9 Miami	28–10
36	November 17, 2018	Blacksburg, VA	Miami	38–14
37	October 5, 2019	Miami Gardens, FL	Virginia Tech	42–35
38	November 14, 2020	Blacksburg, VA	#9 Miami	25–24
39	November 20, 2021	Miami Gardens, FL	Miami	38–26
40	October 15, 2022	Blacksburg, VA	Miami	20–14
41	September 27, 2024	Miami Gardens, FL	#7 Miami	38–34
42	November 22, 2025	Blacksburg, VA	#13 Miami	34–17
43	November 21, 2026	Miami Gardens, FL	#7 Miami	28–20
Series: Miami leads 28–15

== See also ==
- List of NCAA college football rivalry games
