= Jammi German =

American football player (born 1974)

No. 87, 89
- Position: Wide receiver

Personal information
- Born: July 4, 1974 (age 52); Fort Myers, Florida, U.S.
- Listed height: 6 ft 1 in (1.85 m)
- Listed weight: 191 lb (87 kg)

Career information
- High school: Fort Myers (FL)
- College: Miami (FL)
- NFL draft: 1998: 3rd round, 74th overall pick

Career history
- Atlanta Falcons (1998–2000); Cleveland Browns (2001)

Career NFL statistics
- Receptions: 20
- Receiving yards: 294
- Total touchdowns: 3
- Stats at Pro Football Reference

Jammi Darnell German (born July 4, 1974) is an American former professional football player who was a wide receiver in the National Football League (NFL).

== College career ==
He played at the University of Miami in 1995 before missing the entire 1996 and 1997 seasons

== Professional career ==
=== Atlanta Falcons ===
He was selected in the third round by the Atlanta Falcons of 1998 NFL draft.

=== Cleveland Browns ===
He spent his final year with the Cleveland Browns.
