= 1995 Orange Bowl =

1995 FedEx Orange Bowl
- Bowl Coalition National Championship Game; 61st Orange Bowl
- The Miami Orange Bowl in Miami, Florida, hosted the Orange Bowl.
Miami Hurricanes	Nebraska Cornhuskers
(10–1)	(12–0)
Big East	Big Eight
17	24
Head coach: Dennis Erickson	Head coach: Tom Osborne
AP / Coaches / BC; 3 / 3 / 3	AP / Coaches / BC; 1 / 1 / 1
	1	2	3	4	Total
Miami	10	0	7	0	17
Nebraska	0	7	2	15	24
- Date: January 1, 1995
- Season: 1994
- Stadium: Miami Orange Bowl
- Location: Miami, Florida
- MVP: Nebraska QB Tommie Frazier and Miami WR Chris T. Jones
- Favorite: Miami by 1 (37)
- Referee: Ron Winter (Big Ten)
- Attendance: 81,753

United States TV coverage
- Network: NBC
- Announcers: Tom Hammond (play-by-play); Cris Collinsworth (analyst); John Dockery (sideline)
- Nielsen ratings: 18.9

The 1995 Orange Bowl was a college football bowl game played on January 1, 1995, as the 61st edition of the Orange Bowl and the national championship game for the 1994 season. It featured the Nebraska Cornhuskers of the Big Eight and the Miami Hurricanes of the Big East. The game was a rematch of the historic 1984 Orange Bowl. As of 2020, the 1995 Orange Bowl holds the record for Orange Bowl attendance at 81,753.

Although this was the Bowl Coalition's National Championship Game, it was a match-up of the first and third-ranked teams in the country, as second-ranked Penn State was obligated to play in the 1995 Rose Bowl as the Big Ten champion.

This was the last national championship game to be played at one of the participating teams’ home stadiums until 2025, which also featured Miami playing for the title at their current home stadium, Hard Rock Stadium.

== Teams ==
=== Miami ===
Big East champion Miami entered 10–1, ranked third in the AP and Coaches polls.

=== Nebraska ===
Big Eight champion Nebraska entered 12–0, ranked first in the AP and Coaches polls.

== Game ==
Miami placekicker Dane Prewitt scored the first points of the game with a 44-yard field goal to open up a 3–0 Miami lead. Miami quarterback Frank Costa fired a 35-yard touchdown pass to Trent Jones for a 10–0 Miami lead. Nebraska quarterback Brook Berringer threw a 19-yard touchdown pass to tight end Mark Gilman before halftime, to close the deficit to 10–7. In the third quarter, Costa threw a 44-yard touchdown pass to Jonathan Harris, to open a 17–7 lead.

Nebraska outside linebacker Dwayne Harris sacked Costa in the end zone for a safety before the end of the third quarter, and Miami led 17–9. Fullback Cory Schlesinger scored on a 15-yard touchdown run in the fourth quarter to trim the lead to 17–15. Tommie Frazier then found tight end Eric Alford in the back of the end zone to tie the game, 17–17. A 14-yard touchdown run by Schlesinger gave Nebraska a 24–17 lead, and the defense held on to win the national championship.

=== Scoring summary ===
Qtr	Time	Team	Detail	MIA	NU
1	7:54	MIA	Dane Prewitt 44-yd field goal	3	0
1	0:04	MIA	Trent Jones 35-yd pass from Frank Costa (Prewitt kick)	10	0
2	7:54	NU	Mark Gilman 19-yd pass from Brook Berringer (Tom Sieler kick)	10	7
3	13:19	MIA	Jonathan Harris 44-yd pass from Costa (Prewitt kick)	17	7
3	11:35	NU	Costa sacked in end zone by Dwayne Harris	17	9
4	7:38	NU	Cory Schlesinger 15-yd rush (Eric Alford pass from Tommie Frazier)	17	17
4	2:46	NU	Schlesinger 14-yd rush (Sieler kick)	17	24

== Team statistics ==
Statistic	Miami	Nebraska
First downs	14	20
Rushes–yards	28–29	46–199
Comp.–att.–yards	18–35–248	11–20–106
Total offense	277	305
Turnovers	2	2
Punts–average	7–39.7	7–41.1
Penalties–yards	11–92	3–20
Possession time	27:28	32:32

== Aftermath ==
Nebraska finished the season with a 13–0 record, and won the national championship (The program's third of five). Miami finished the season ranked sixth, with a 10–2 record. It was Nebraska's first bowl win since the 1987 Sugar Bowl.

Second-ranked and also undefeated Penn State won its bowl game (the 1995 Rose Bowl), which led to much controversy after only Nebraska was crowned national champions. It was not until the Bowl Championship Series (BCS) was formed in 1998 that the Big Ten and Pac-10 would allow their champions to compete in national championship games outside the Rose Bowl Game.

Less than two weeks after the game, Dennis Erickson departed the Hurricanes to take the head coaching position with the National Football League's Seattle Seahawks. Miami hired Dallas Cowboys defensive coordinator Butch Davis as Erickson's successor.
