= Yatil Green =

American football player (born 1973)

No. 87
- Position: Wide receiver

Personal information
- Born: November 25, 1973 (age 52); Gainesville, Florida, U.S.
- Listed height: 6 ft 2 in (1.88 m)
- Listed weight: 205 lb (93 kg)

Career information
- High school: Columbia (Lake City, Florida)
- College: Miami (FL)
- NFL draft: 1997: 1st round, 15th overall pick

Career history
- Miami Dolphins (1997–1999); New York Jets (2000)*; Oakland Raiders (2001)*
- * Offseason or practice squad member only

Career NFL statistics
- Receptions: 18
- Receiving yards: 234
- Receiving average: 13
- Stats at Pro Football Reference

Yatil Devon Green (born November 25, 1973) is an American former professional football player. A 6'2", 205 lbs. wide receiver from the University of Miami, he was selected by the Miami Dolphins in the first round (15th overall pick) of the 1997 NFL draft, as Miami saw him as a much-needed speed receiver to add to a solid but unspectacular group of possession wideouts. He was represented by Miami-based sports agent, Drew Rosenhaus.

However, on the first day of training camp, Green tore his quadriceps muscles, anterior cruciate ligament and cartilage in his right knee. Green came back the next year with Miami again pinning all of the team's downfield threat hopes on him (they did not draft, trade for, or sign any receivers with any downfield speed during the 1998 offseason), but suffered an ACL re-rupture in training camp. In his third and only season playing, 1999, he played in eight games, catching 18 passes for 234 yards and no touchdowns, and was inactive for both of Miami's playoff games. After three years and a total of 10 surgeries on his right knee, he was cut by the Dolphins shortly after the 1999 season ended. Green would be signed by the New York Jets and Oakland Raiders before the 2000 and 2001 seasons, but he made no receptions during his brief regular season tenure in New York before being released and was cut by the Raiders after an unimpressive preseason. He never played in the NFL again.
