= Bowl Coalition =

American college football alliance

- In operation: 1992–1994
- Preceded by: Various contemporary and retroactive selectors (1869–1935); National polls (1936–1991)
- Succeeded by: Bowl Alliance (1995–1997); Bowl Championship Series (1998–2013); College Football Playoff and New Year's Six (2014–present)
- Number of Coalition bowls: Tier 1: 4 each season; Tier 2: 3 (1992) or 2 (1993–1994)
- Television partner(s): ABC, CBS, NBC and TBS
- Most Coalition bowl appearances: Florida, Florida State, Miami (FL), Nebraska and Notre Dame (3)
- Most Coalition bowl wins: Florida State (3)
- Most Coalition bowl championships: Alabama, Florida State and Nebraska (1)
- Conference with most appearances: ACC, Big East, Big Eight, SEC and SWC (6)
- Conference with most game wins: SEC (5)
- Conference with most championships: ACC, Big Eight and SEC (1)
- Last championship game: 1995 Orange Bowl
- Last champion: Nebraska

The College Football Bowl Coalition was formed through an agreement among NCAA Division I-A college football bowl games and conferences for the purpose of better scheduling a national championship game between the top two teams and to provide quality bowl game matchups for the champions of its member conferences. It was established for the 1992 season after there were co-national champions for both 1990 and 1991. The agreement was in place for the 1992, 1993, and 1994 college football seasons. It was the predecessor of the Bowl Alliance (1995–1997), and later the Bowl Championship Series (1998–2013) and the College Football Playoff (2014–present).

== Background ==
Since the Associated Press began crowning its national champion in 1968 following the bowl games, the two top-ranked teams going into the bowls had faced one other in a bowl only six times, most recently in the 1987 season. Due to often rigid existing bowl tie-ins, and various conference regulations, it was not uncommon that the two top-ranked teams at the end of the regular season would never meet on the field, even when there was a clear-cut #1 and #2. Following two consecutive seasons of split national championships (1990 and 1991), there was a renewed interest in devising a system that would provide for a #1 vs. #2 national championship bowl game.

The College Football Bowl Coalition consisted of five member conferences (SEC, Big 8, SWC, ACC, and Big East) along with independent Notre Dame and seven bowl games (Orange, Sugar, Cotton, Fiesta, Gator, Sun, and, for the 1992 season only, the Blockbuster Bowl).

Under the agreement, bowl bids would be extended to the five member conference champions plus five at-large teams. The at-large teams would come from a pool of the member conference runners-up (SEC, Big 8, SWC, ACC, Big East), independent Notre Dame, the runner-up of the Pac-10, and the SEC's third-place team (the SEC started playing a championship game in 1992 and the championship game loser was tied to the Citrus Bowl). The Orange, Sugar, Cotton, and Fiesta Bowls were "Tier 1 Bowls" under the Coalition agreement, and the Gator, Sun, and Blockbuster were "Tier 2 Bowls".

The Orange, Sugar, and Cotton bowls retained their long-standing agreements to invite the Big 8, SEC, and SWC champions, respectively. According to the initial Bowl Coalition rules, if champions from these conferences were ranked No. 1 and No. 2, they would not have played each other in a national championship game and instead each gone to their respective traditional bowl.

In later years, the Big 8, SEC, and SWC champions would be released to play in another bowl if it was necessary to force a "title game". For example, if the SEC and SWC champions were ranked first and second, the Cotton Bowl would have released the SWC champ to play in the Sugar Bowl, or the Sugar would have released the SEC champ to play in the Cotton. This did not happen in any of the three years, as either the Big East or ACC champion qualified for the championship in those years.

The top "host" team played the top "at-large" team in the host team's affiliated bowl. Slots for the games were chosen by the "Bowl Poll", in which the points from the AP and Coaches polls were combined. If the top two teams were both "at-large", then the Fiesta would have hosted the "title game". The third place team from the SEC hosted the Gator Bowl.

The system worked perfectly in its first year. Big East champion Miami was ranked first in both polls, while SEC champion Alabama was ranked second. As Big East champion, Miami was free to face Alabama in the 1993 Sugar Bowl, forcing the first bowl matchup between the consensus #1 and #2 teams since 1987.

== Criticism ==
The Coalition was flawed in several respects. Most significantly, it did not include the champions of the Big Ten and Pac-10, both of whom were contractually obligated to play in the Rose Bowl. The Coalition's founders tried to get the Tournament of Roses Association to release the Big Ten and Pac-10 champions to play in a title game if one of them was ranked #1 or #2 in the Bowl Poll, but it refused to do so due to concerns about this potentially violating its television contract with ABC.

The possibility also still existed that an undefeated and untied team would not get a chance to play for the national championship. This occurred during the 1993 season. Nebraska and West Virginia both finished the season 11–0. West Virginia ranked #2 in the final regular season Coaches Poll (behind #1 Nebraska), but was ranked #3 in the final regular season AP Poll (behind #1 Florida State and #2 Nebraska). The margin between West Virginia and Florida State was large enough to drop the Mountaineers to third in the Bowl Coalition poll, forcing them to settle for a berth in the Sugar Bowl.

The Coalition did not include the so-called "mid-major" Division I-A conferences (WAC, Big West, and Mid-American), nor any of the I-A independents besides Notre Dame. However, it was argued that most of these schools did not have schedules strong enough to be legitimate title contenders. For example, when BYU won the national championship in 1984 — the last time a team from a mid-major conference has won a consensus national championship to date — some college football pundits argued that the Cougars had not played a legitimate schedule. BYU had only played one ranked team all season, and only two of the Cougars' opponents won more than seven games. Despite criticism of their schedule, the Cougars were a near-unanimous pick as national champion at the end of the season. The Coalition's exclusion of mid-major conferences made it difficult for this to ever happen again.

== Demise ==
The Bowl Coalition's demise came about, in large part, as the result of two events that occurred in the 1994 season. First, the Southwest Conference, which had seen a marked decline in its quality of play over the past decade, announced it would dissolve after the 1995 season. Also, after finishing 10–1–1 in 1992 and 11–1 in 1993, Notre Dame slipped to 6–4–1 in 1994. They were still invited to the Fiesta Bowl that season, losing 41–24 to Colorado. The sudden fall of Notre Dame led some involved in the Bowl Coalition to be concerned about the possibility of Notre Dame failing to win the minimum six games to be eligible for a bowl invitation. To alleviate these concerns, before the 1995 season the Bowl Coalition was reconfigured into the Bowl Alliance, breaking up the conference tie-ins and tweaking a system that still did not include the Big Ten and the Pac-10.

The final year of the Bowl Coalition saw its formula break down completely, as the situation it was designed to prevent (a split national championship) presented itself as a serious possibility. Nebraska (12–0) finished the regular season ranked #1 in both the AP and Coaches polls while Penn State (11–0) ranked #2 in both polls. Penn State had decided prior to the formation of the Bowl Coalition to give up its independent football status to join the Big Ten, a conference not part of the coalition and whose champion was contractually obligated to play in the Rose Bowl. Nebraska, as Big 8 champion, qualified automatically for the Orange Bowl. Since the #2 team in the polls was unavailable, the coalition invited the next highest ranked team, #3 Miami, to face Nebraska in its national championship game. The Orange Bowl was scheduled for New Year's night in Miami, while Penn State would face Oregon the following afternoon in the Rose Bowl (New Year's Day fell on a Sunday in 1995; when this happens bowls scheduled for January 1 are typically moved back one day). This meant that not only would there be a split championship if Miami won, but that Penn State's fate could be sealed before they even had a chance to play their game. In the end Nebraska defeated Miami to win the Orange Bowl and became consensus champions despite Penn State's win over Oregon in the Rose Bowl.

One legacy of the Bowl Coalition was that it cemented the status of the Fiesta Bowl as a major bowl. The Fiesta Bowl was by far the youngest of the "Tier 1" bowls. Indeed, it was the only "Tier 1" bowl that was less than a half-century old at the time, and was far newer than the "Tier 2" Gator and Sun Bowls.

== Bowl Coalition games ==
=== 1992 season ===
Tier I
Bowl	Date	Winner	Con.	Score	Loser	Con.	Score
Cotton	January 1, 1993	5 Notre Dame (10–1–1)	Ind.	28	4 Texas A&M (12–0)	SWC	3
Fiesta	January 1, 1993	6 Syracuse (10–2)	Big East #2	26	10 Colorado (9–2–1)	Big 8 #2	22
Orange	January 1, 1993	3 Florida State (11–1)	ACC	27	11 Nebraska (9–3)	Big 8	14
**Sugar**	January 1, 1993	2 Alabama (12–0)	SEC	34	1 Miami (FL) (11–0)	Big East	13

Tier II
Bowl	Date	Winner	Con.	Score	Loser	Con.	Score
Hancock	December 31, 1992	Baylor (7–5)	SWC #2	20	22 Arizona (6–5–1)	Pac-10	15
Gator	December 31, 1992	14 Florida (9–4)	SEC #3	27	12 NC State (9–3–1)	ACC #2	10
Blockbuster	January 1, 1993	13 Stanford (9–3)	Pac-10 #2	24	21 Penn State (7–5)	Ind.	3

=== 1993 season ===
Tier I
Bowl	Date	Winner	Con.	Score	Loser	Con.	Score
Cotton	January 1, 1994	4 Notre Dame (10–1)	Ind.	24	7 Texas A&M (10–1)	SWC	21
Fiesta	January 1, 1994	16 Arizona (9–2)	Pac-10 #2	29	10 Miami (FL) (9–2)	Big East #2	0
Sugar	January 1, 1994	8 Florida (10–2)	SEC	41	3 West Virginia (11–0)	Big East	7
**Orange**	January 1, 1994	1 Florida State (11–1)	ACC	18	2 Nebraska (11–0)	Big 8	16

Tier II
Bowl	Date	Winner	Con.	Score	Loser	Con.	Score
Hancock	December 24, 1993	19 Oklahoma (8–3)	Big 8 #2	41	Texas Tech (6–5)	SWC #2	10
Gator	December 31, 1993	18 Alabama (8–3–1)	SEC #3	24	12 North Carolina (10–2)	ACC #2	10

=== 1994 season ===
Tier I
Bowl	Date	Winner	Con.	Score	Loser	Con.	Score
Cotton	January 2, 1995	21 USC (7–3–1)	Pac-10 #2	55	Texas Tech (6–5)	SWC	14
Fiesta	January 2, 1995	4 Colorado (10–1)	Big 8 #2	41	Notre Dame (6–4–1)	Ind.	24
Sugar	January 2, 1995	7 Florida State (9–1–1)	ACC	23	5 Florida (10–1–1)	SEC	17
**Orange**	January 1, 1995	1 Nebraska (12–0)	Big 8	24	3 Miami (FL) (10–1)	Big East	17

Tier II
Bowl	Date	Winner	Con.	Score	Loser	Con.	Score
Sun	December 30, 1994	Texas (8–3)	SWC #2	35	19 North Carolina (8–3)	ACC #2	31
Gator	December 30, 1994	Tennessee (7–4)	SEC #3	45	17 Virginia Tech (8–3)	Big East #2	23

Notes:

- **Bold** denotes Bowl Coalition National Championship Game
- Rankings are from the AP Poll. Records and Rankings are prior to bowl games.
- The Blockbuster Bowl was a coalition bowl in 1992, but not in 1993 or 1994. The John Hancock Bowl, which had previously pitted the final Coalition team against an at-large opponent, inherited the Blockbuster's coalition pick, and pitted the final two Coalition teams against each other in 1993 and 1994
- After the 1993 game, the John Hancock Bowl reverted to its original name of the Sun Bowl.

== Appearances ==
=== Bowl Coalition appearances by team ===
Appearances	School	W	L	Pct	Games
3	Florida State	3	0	1.000	Won 1993 Orange Bowl; Won 1994 Orange Bowl+ Won 1995 Sugar Bowl (January)
3	Florida	2	1	.666	Won 1992 Gator Bowl; Won 1994 Sugar Bowl; Lost 1995 Sugar Bowl (January)
3	Notre Dame	2	1	.666	Won 1993 Cotton Bowl Classic; Won 1994 Cotton Bowl Classic; Lost 1995 Fiesta Bowl
3	Nebraska	1	2	0.333	Lost 1993 Orange Bowl; Lost 1994 Orange Bowl+ Won 1995 Orange Bowl+
3	Miami (FL)	0	3	.000	Lost 1993 Sugar Bowl+ Lost 1994 Fiesta Bowl; Lost 1995 Orange Bowl+
2	Alabama	2	0	1.000	Won 1993 Sugar Bowl+ Won 1993 Gator Bowl
2	Arizona	1	1	.500	Lost 1992 John Hancock Bowl; Won 1994 Fiesta Bowl
2	Colorado	1	1	.500	Lost 1993 Fiesta Bowl; Won 1994 Fiesta Bowl
2	North Carolina	0	2	.000	Lost 1993 Gator Bowl; Lost 1994 Sun Bowl
2	Texas A&M	0	2	.000	Lost 1993 Cotton Bowl Classic; Lost 1994 Cotton Bowl Classic
2	Texas Tech	0	2	.000	Lost 1993 John Hancock Bowl; Lost1995 Cotton Bowl Classic
1	Baylor	1	0	1.000	Won 1992 John Hancock Bowl
1	Oklahoma	1	0	1.000	Won 1993 John Hancock Bowl
1	Stanford	1	0	1.000	Won 1993 Blockbuster Bowl
1	Syracuse	1	0	1.000	Won 1993 Fiesta Bowl
1	Tennessee	1	0	1.000	Won 1994 Gator Bowl
1	Texas	1	0	1.000	Won 1994 Sun Bowl
1	USC	1	0	1.000	Won 1995 Cotton Bowl Classic
1	N.C. State	0	1	.000	Lost 1992 Gator Bowl
1	Penn State	0	1	.000	Lost 1993 Blockbuster Bowl
1	Virginia Tech	0	1	.000	Lost 1994 Gator Bowl
1	West Virginia	0	1	.000	Lost 1994 Sugar Bowl

+ Denotes Bowl Coalition National Championship Game

=== Bowl Coalition National Championship Game appearances by team ===
Appearances	School	W	L	Pct	Games
2	Nebraska	1	1	.500	Lost 1994 Orange Bowl; Won 1995 Orange Bowl
2	Miami (FL)	0	2	.000	Lost 1993 Sugar Bowl; Lost 1995 Orange Bowl
1	Alabama	1	0	1.000	Won 1993 Sugar Bowl
1	Florida State	1	0	1.000	Won 1994 Orange Bowl

=== Bowl Coalition appearances by conference ===
Conference	Appearances	W	L	Pct	# Schools	School(s)
SEC	6	5	1	.833	3	Florida (2–1); Alabama (2–0); Tennessee (1–0)
Big 8	6	3	3	.500	3	Nebraska (1–2); Colorado (1–1); Oklahoma (1–0)
ACC	6	3	3	.500	3	Florida State (3–0); North Carolina (0–2); NC State (0–1)
SWC	6	2	4	.333	4	Texas A&M (0–2); Texas Tech (0–2); Texas (1–0); Baylor (1–0)
Big East	6	1	5	.167	4	Miami, FL (0–3); Syracuse (1–0); Virginia Tech (0–1); West Virginia (0–1)
Pac-10	4	3	1	.750	3	Arizona (1–1); USC (1–0); Stanford (1–0)
Independent	4	2	2	.500	2	Notre Dame (2–1); Penn State (0–1)

=== Bowl Coalition National Championship Game appearances by conference ===
Conference	Appearances	W	L	Pct	# Schools	School(s)
Big 8	2	1	1	.500	1	Nebraska (1–1)
Big East	2	0	2	.000	1	Miami, FL (0–2)
SEC	1	1	0	1.000	1	Alabama (1–0)
ACC	1	1	0	1.000	1	Florida State (1–0)

== Heisman Trophy winners in Bowl Coalition National Championship Games ==
Season	Player	School	Result	Stats	Notes
1992	Gino Torretta	Miami (FL)	L	24-56-3, 278 yards, 0 TD; 5-1 rush	
1993	Charlie Ward	Florida State	W	24-43-0, 286, 0 TD; 8-(-3) rush	
