= Scott Covington =

American gridiron football player (born 1976)

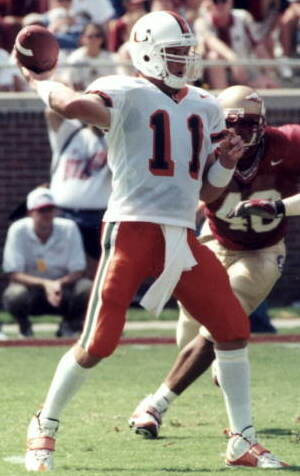
- Covington with Miami in 1997

No. 4
- Position: Quarterback

Personal information
- Born: January 17, 1976 (age 50); Fresno, California, U.S.
- Listed height: 6 ft 3 in (1.91 m)
- Listed weight: 217 lb (98 kg)

Career information
- High school: Dana Hills (Dana Point, California)
- College: Miami (FL)
- NFL draft: 1999: 7th round, 245th overall pick

Career history
- Cincinnati Bengals (1999–2001); St. Louis Rams (2002); Kansas City Chiefs (2003)*; St. Louis Rams (2003); Toronto Argonauts (2005)*
- * Offseason or practice squad member only

Career NFL statistics
- Passing attempts: 10
- Passing completions: 6
- Completion percentage: 60%
- TD–INT: 0–0
- Passing yards: 30
- Passer rating: 64.6
- Stats at Pro Football Reference

Scott Campbell Covington (born January 17, 1976) is an American former professional football player who was a quarterback in the National Football League (NFL). He played college football for the Miami Hurricanes. He played five seasons in the NFL for the Cincinnati Bengals and St. Louis Rams and one season in the Canadian Football League (CFL) for the Toronto Argonauts.

== College career ==
Covington played in college football at the University of Miami. He was the starting quarterback for the Hurricanes in 1997 after Ryan Clement suffered an injury in the middle of the season. Covington had an average college career, mostly serving as a backup for Clement. He did not earn a chance to start until his senior year in 1998, helping the Hurricanes to a 9–3 record, including a season defining win against the then #3 UCLA Bruins, 49–45, in the final regular season game.

== Professional career ==
Covington was selected 245th overall in the seventh round of the 1999 NFL draft by the Cincinnati Bengals, for whom he played with for three seasons. He spent the majority of those three seasons as the third-string quarterback, behind the likes of Akili Smith and Scott Mitchell. He appeared in just 3 games, completing 4 of 5 passes for 23 yards and running the ball twice for -4 yards. In 2002, he joined the St. Louis Rams, where he played for two seasons. He played in just one game, but he also started it in place of an injured Kurt Warner. He completed 2 of 5 passes for 7 yards and was sacked twice before being replaced by Jamie Martin. He was released during the 2004 offseason.

== Post NFL career ==
After sitting out the entire 2004 season, Covington was signed by the Toronto Argonauts of the Canadian Football League (CFL) on March 1, 2005. He was released on June 18.
