= Wimbley =

Wimbley is a surname. Notable people with the surname include:

- Damon Wimbley (born 1966), American rapper
- Kamerion Wimbley (born 1983), American football player
- Prince Wimbley (born 1970), American and Canadian football player
- Shakima Wimbley (born 1995), American sprinter
