= 1992 Arkansas Razorbacks football team =

American college football season

1992 Arkansas Razorbacks football
- Conference: Southeastern Conference
- Western Division
- Record: 3–7–1 (3–4–1 SEC)
- Head coach: Jack Crowe (3rd season; first game); Joe Kines (interim; final 10 games)
- Offensive coordinator: Greg Davis (1st season)
- Defensive coordinator: Joe Kines (2nd season)
- Captains: Darwin Ireland; E. D. Jackson; Owen Kelly
- Home stadium: Razorback Stadium; War Memorial Stadium

1992 Southeastern Conference football standings
	Conf.					Overall
Team	W		L		T	W		L		T
Eastern Division
No. 10 Florida xy	6	–	2	–	0	9	–	4	–	0
No. 8 Georgia x	6	–	2	–	0	10	–	2	–	0
No. 12 Tennessee	5	–	3	–	0	9	–	3	–	0
South Carolina	3	–	5	–	0	5	–	6	–	0
Vanderbilt	2	–	6	–	0	4	–	7	–	0
Kentucky	2	–	6	–	0	4	–	7	–	0
Western Division
No. 1 Alabama x$	8	–	0	–	0	13	–	0	–	0
No. 16 Ole Miss	5	–	3	–	0	9	–	3	–	0
No. 23 Mississippi State	4	–	4	–	0	7	–	5	–	0
Arkansas	3	–	4	–	1	3	–	7	–	1
Auburn	2	–	5	–	1	5	–	5	–	1
LSU	1	–	7	–	0	2	–	9	–	0
Championship: Alabama 28, Florida 21
$ – Conference champion; x – Division champion/co-champions; y – Championship game participant; Rankings from AP Poll

The 1992 Arkansas Razorbacks football team represented the University of Arkansas as a member of the Western Division of the Southeastern Conference (SEC) during the 1992 NCAA Division I-A football season. The Razorbacks compiled an overall record of 3–7–1, with a mark of 3–4–1 in conference play, and finished in fourth place in the SEC Western Division. Head coach Jack Crowe was fired after the first game, when Arkansas lost to I-AA The Citadel. Joe Kines was promoted from defensive coordinator to interim head coach until the end of the season, when Danny Ford was hired as head coach.

The Razorbacks won their first game in the SEC after they defeated South Carolina, 45–7, at Williams–Brice Stadium. The season was highlighted with an upset victory over #4 Tennessee, led by Heisman candidate Heath Shuler, thanks in part to a game-winning 41-yard field goal from Todd Wright with just two seconds left on the clock. The victory effectively kept the Volunteers out of a three-way tie for 1st place in the SEC East at season's end, as Tennessee finished one-game behind Division co-champions Florida and Georgia in the SEC's first year of divisional play. Wright, who also secured two other 45+ yard field goals, an onside kick, and a forced fumble, was named "player of the game" due to his efforts, and the game has since become an all-time favorite for Razorback fans. Despite finishing 3–7–1, Arkansas ended their season with a 30–6 rout of LSU, their first victory against the Tigers since 1929.

== Schedule ==
Date	Time	Opponent	Site	TV	Result	Attendance	Source
September 5	2:00 p.m.	The Citadel*	Razorback Stadium; Fayetteville, AR		L 3–10	35,868	
September 12	6:00 p.m.	at South Carolina	Williams–Brice Stadium; Columbia, SC		W 45–7	63,100	
September 19	7:00 p.m.	No. 9 Alabama	War Memorial Stadium; Little Rock, AR	PPV	L 11–38	55,912	
September 26	7:30 p.m.	at Memphis State*	Liberty Bowl Memorial Stadium; Memphis, TN		L 6–22	38,968	
October 3	11:30 a.m.	No. 16 Georgia	Razorback Stadium; Fayetteville, AR	JPS	L 3–27	49,412	
October 10	11:30 a.m.	at No. 4 Tennessee	Neyland Stadium; Knoxville, TN	JPS	W 25–24	95,202	
October 17	11:30 a.m.	Ole Miss	War Memorial Stadium; Little Rock, AR (rivalry)	JPS	L 3–17	53,513	
October 31	12:30 p.m.	at Auburn	Jordan-Hare Stadium; Auburn, AL		T 24–24	77,933	
November 7	1:30 p.m.	at No. 19 Mississippi State	Scott Field; Starkville, MS		L 3–10	36,103	
November 21	2:00 p.m.	SMU*	War Memorial Stadium; Little Rock, AR		L 19–24	41,080	
November 27	3:00 p.m.	LSU	Razorback Stadium; Fayetteville, AR (rivalry)	ESPN	W 30–6	32,721	
*Non-conference game; Rankings from AP Poll released prior to the game; All times are in Central time

== Roster ==
1992 Arkansas Razorbacks football team roster
Players
Coaches
Offense

Pos.	#	Name	Class
QB	7	Barry Lunney	Fr
QB	13	Jason Allen	So
RB	8	E.D. Jackson	Sr
RB	30	Oscar Malone	So
WR	2	Ron Dickerson Jr.	Sr
WR	9	Tracy Caldwell	Jr
TE	89	Kirk Botkin	Jr
OL	77	Isaac Davis	Jr

Defense

Pos.	#	Name	Class
DL	92	Henry Ford	Jr
DL	95	Ray Lee Johnson	Jr
LB	16	Darwin Ireland	Jr
DB	3	Orlando Watters	Jr

Special teams

Pos.	#	Name	Class
PK	11	Todd Wright	Sr

Head coach

- Jack Crowe - head coach for Game 1.

Coordinators/assistant coaches

- Joe Kines - interim head coach for Game 2 through Game 11.
- Danny Ford

Legend

- (C) Team captain
- (S) Suspended
- (I) Ineligible
- Injured
- Redshirt
