= 1992 Gator Bowl =

1992 Outback Gator Bowl
Florida Gators	NC State Wolfpack
(8–4)	(9–2–1)
SEC	ACC
27	10
Head coach: Steve Spurrier	Head coach: Dick Sheridan
AP / Coaches / BC; 14 / 15 / 15	AP / Coaches / BC; 12 / 12 / 12
	1	2	3	4	Total
Florida	0	10	10	7	27
NC State	0	0	3	7	10
- Date: December 31, 1992
- Season: 1992
- Stadium: Gator Bowl Stadium
- Location: Jacksonville, Florida
- MVP: RB Errict Rhett, Florida; WR Reggie Lawrence, NC State
- Referee: Ron Winter (Big Ten)
- Attendance: 71,233

United States TV coverage
- Network: TBS
- Announcers: Gary Bender, Pat Haden and Craig Sager

The 1992 Gator Bowl was an American college football bowl game that was played on December 31, 1992, at Gator Bowl Stadium in Jacksonville, Florida. The game matched the Florida Gators against the NC State Wolfpack. It was the final 1992 NCAA Division I-A football season contest for both teams. It was the first of three Gator Bowls sponsored by Outback Steakhouse; thus, it was also known as the 1992 Outback Gator Bowl. The game ended in a 27–10 victory for the Gators.

== Overview ==
The game matched the Florida Gators of the Southeastern Conference against the NC State Wolfpack of the Atlantic Coast Conference. The Gators, having lost the 1992 SEC Championship Game to the Alabama Crimson Tide, were co-champions of the Eastern Division of the SEC with the Georgia Bulldogs. The Wolfpack were runners-up in the ACC behind the Florida State Seminoles. The game was the first bowl game featuring the Gators and the Wolfpack, and was their thirteenth meeting. Florida led the series 8–4–1 heading into the game.

== Game summary ==
=== Scoring summary ===
Scoring summary

Quarter	Time	Drive			Team	Scoring information	Score	
Quarter	Time	Plays	Yards	TOP	Team	Scoring information	FLA	NCSU
2					FLA	34-yard field goal by Davis	3	0
2					FLA	Shane Matthews 1-yard touchdown run, Davis kick good	10	0
3					FLA	Willie Jackson 17-yard touchdown reception from Matthews, Davis kick good	17	0
3					NCSU	23-yard field goal by Videtich	17	3
3					FLA	42-yard field goal by Davis	20	3
4					NCSU	Aubrey Shaw 11-yard touchdown reception from Terry Jordan, Videtich kick good	20	10
4					FLA	Harrison Houston 34-yard touchdown reception from Matthews, Davis kick good	27	10
"TOP" = time of possession. For other American football terms, see Glossary of American football.							27	10

=== Statistics ===
Statistics	FLA	NCSU
First downs	26	13
Plays–yards	69–445	47–267
Rushes–yards	50–198	25–54
Passing yards	247	213
Passing: Comp–Att–Int	19–39–2	22–42–1
Time of possession	33:43	26:17
