= 1992 Tennessee Volunteers football team =

American college football season

1992 Tennessee Volunteers football

Hall of Fame Bowl champion

Hall of Fame Bowl, W 38–23 vs. Boston College
- Conference: Southeastern Conference
- Eastern Division

Ranking
- Coaches: No. 12
- AP: No. 12
- Record: 9–3 (5–3 SEC)
- Head coach: Johnny Majors (16th season; games 4–11); Phillip Fulmer (games 1–3, bowl game)
- Offensive coordinator: Phillip Fulmer (4th season)
- Offensive scheme: Pro-style
- Defensive coordinator: Larry Marmie (1st season)
- Base defense: 4–3
- Captains: Todd Kelly; J. J. McCleskey
- Home stadium: Neyland Stadium

1992 Southeastern Conference football standings
	Conf.					Overall
Team	W		L		T	W		L		T
Eastern Division
No. 10 Florida xy	6	–	2	–	0	9	–	4	–	0
No. 8 Georgia x	6	–	2	–	0	10	–	2	–	0
No. 12 Tennessee	5	–	3	–	0	9	–	3	–	0
South Carolina	3	–	5	–	0	5	–	6	–	0
Vanderbilt	2	–	6	–	0	4	–	7	–	0
Kentucky	2	–	6	–	0	4	–	7	–	0
Western Division
No. 1 Alabama x$	8	–	0	–	0	13	–	0	–	0
No. 16 Ole Miss	5	–	3	–	0	9	–	3	–	0
No. 23 Mississippi State	4	–	4	–	0	7	–	5	–	0
Arkansas	3	–	4	–	1	3	–	7	–	1
Auburn	2	–	5	–	1	5	–	5	–	1
LSU	1	–	7	–	0	2	–	9	–	0
Championship: Alabama 28, Florida 21
$ – Conference champion; x – Division champion/co-champions; y – Championship game participant; Rankings from AP Poll

The 1992 Tennessee Volunteers football team represented the University of Tennessee in the 1992 NCAA Division I-A football season. The Volunteers were a member of the Southeastern Conference (SEC), in the Eastern Division and played their home games at Neyland Stadium in Knoxville, Tennessee. They finished the season with a record of nine wins and three (9–3 overall, 5–3 in the SEC) and with a victory over Boston College in the Hall of Fame Bowl. The Volunteers offense scored 347 points while the defense allowed 196 points.

Johnny Majors was to enter his sixteenth season as the Volunteers' head coach for the 1992 season. However, in August, Majors underwent emergency quintuple bypass surgery, and as a result Phillip Fulmer was named interim head coach. After Fulmer led the Vols to a 3–0 start, Majors returned and led Tennessee to a 5–3 finish. By the end of the season, the university bought-out the remainder of Majors' contract, and on November 29, Fulmer was named as the Volunteers' new head coach effective after the Hall of Fame Bowl. However, on December 4, Majors announced he would not coach the team in the bowl game, and as a result Fulmer went on to coach the Volunteers to 38–23 victory over Boston College in his first game as Tennessee's full-time head coach. The school officially credits Majors with a record of five wins and three losses (5–3) and Fulmer with four wins and zero losses (4–0) for the 1992 season.

== Schedule ==
Date	Time	Opponent	Rank	Site	TV	Result	Attendance	Source
September 5	1:00 p.m.	Southwestern Louisiana*	No. 22	Neyland Stadium; Knoxville, TN		W 38–3	95,110	
September 12	3:30 p.m.	at No. 14 Georgia	No. 20	Sanford Stadium; Athens, GA (rivalry)	ESPN	W 34–31	85,434	
September 19	3:30 p.m.	No. 4 Florida	No. 14	Neyland Stadium; Knoxville, TN (rivalry)	ABC	W 31–14	97,137	
September 26	4:00 p.m.	Cincinnati*^{†}	No. 8	Neyland Stadium; Knoxville, TN	PPV	W 40–0	96,597	
October 3	7:30 p.m.	at LSU	No. 7	Tiger Stadium; Baton Rouge, LA	ESPN	W 20–0	68,318	
October 10	12:30 p.m.	Arkansas	No. 4	Neyland Stadium; Knoxville, TN	JPS	L 24–25	95,202	
October 17	3:30 p.m.	No. 4 Alabama	No. 13	Neyland Stadium; Knoxville, TN (Third Saturday in October)	ABC	L 10–17	97,388	
October 31	12:30 p.m.	at South Carolina	No. 16	Williams–Brice Stadium; Columbia, SC (rivalry)	JPS	L 23–24	71,529	
November 14	1:30 p.m.	at Memphis State*	No. 23	Liberty Bowl Memorial Stadium; Memphis, TN	PPV	W 26–21	65,234	
November 21	1:00 p.m.	Kentucky	No. 20	Neyland Stadium; Knoxville, TN (rivalry)		W 34–13	94,110	
November 28	2:30 p.m.	at Vanderbilt	No. 18	Vanderbilt Stadium; Nashville, TN (rivalry)	PPV	W 29–25	41,000	
January 1	11:05 a.m.	vs. No. 16 Boston College*	No. 17	Tampa Stadium; Tampa, FL (Hall of Fame Bowl)	ESPN	W 38–23	52,056	
*Non-conference game; ^{†}Homecoming; Rankings from AP Poll released prior to the game; All times are in Eastern time

== Roster ==
1992 Tennessee Volunteers football team roster
Players
Coaches
Offense

Pos.	#	Name	Class
WR	12	Cory Fleming	Jr
RB	33	James Stewart	So
QB	21	Heath Shuler	So

Defense

Pos.	#	Name	Class
DE	58	Todd Kelly	Sr

Special teams

Pos.	#	Name	Class

Head coach

- Johnny Majors (games 4–11)
- Phillip Fulmer (games 1–3, bowl)

Coordinators/assistant coaches

- Phillip Fulmer – Offensive coordinator/offensive line
- David Cutcliffe – Quarterbacks/passing game coordinator
- Charlie Coe – Running backs
- Randy Sanders – Wide receivers
- Mark Bradley – Tight ends
- Larry Marmie – Defensive coordinator
- Ray Hamilton – Defensive line
- Bob Maddox – Defensive line
- John Chavis – Linebackers
- Tim Keane – Defensive backs

Legend

- (C) Team captain
- (S) Suspended
- (I) Ineligible
- Injured
- Redshirt

== Team players drafted into the NFL ==
Player	Position	Round	Pick	NFL club
Todd Kelly	Defensive end	1	27	San Francisco 49ers
Dave Thomas	Defensive back	8	203	Dallas Cowboys
