= 1992 Kentucky Wildcats football team =

American college football season

1992 Kentucky Wildcats football
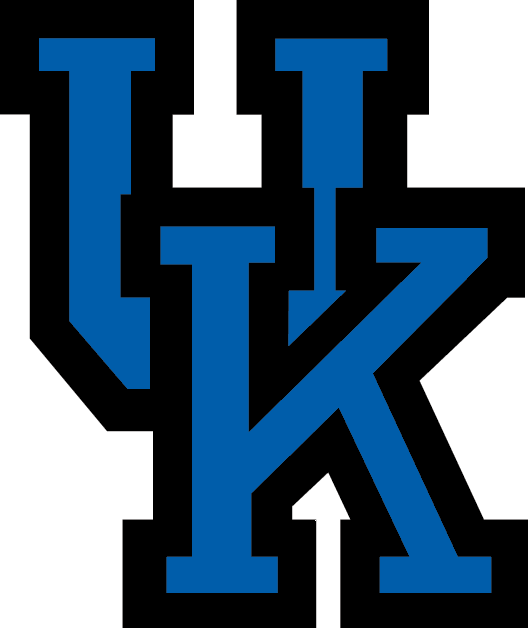
- Conference: Southeastern Conference
- Eastern Division
- Record: 4–7 (2–6 SEC)
- Head coach: Bill Curry (3rd season)
- Offensive coordinator: Rick Rhoades (2nd season)
- Offensive scheme: Multiple
- Defensive coordinator: Larry New (3rd season)
- Base defense: 4–3
- Home stadium: Commonwealth Stadium

1992 Southeastern Conference football standings
	Conf.					Overall
Team	W		L		T	W		L		T
Eastern Division
No. 10 Florida xy	6	–	2	–	0	9	–	4	–	0
No. 8 Georgia x	6	–	2	–	0	10	–	2	–	0
No. 12 Tennessee	5	–	3	–	0	9	–	3	–	0
South Carolina	3	–	5	–	0	5	–	6	–	0
Vanderbilt	2	–	6	–	0	4	–	7	–	0
Kentucky	2	–	6	–	0	4	–	7	–	0
Western Division
No. 1 Alabama x$	8	–	0	–	0	13	–	0	–	0
No. 16 Ole Miss	5	–	3	–	0	9	–	3	–	0
No. 23 Mississippi State	4	–	4	–	0	7	–	5	–	0
Arkansas	3	–	4	–	1	3	–	7	–	1
Auburn	2	–	5	–	1	5	–	5	–	1
LSU	1	–	7	–	0	2	–	9	–	0
Championship: Alabama 28, Florida 21
$ – Conference champion; x – Division champion/co-champions; y – Championship game participant; Rankings from AP Poll

The 1992 Kentucky Wildcats football team represented the University of Kentucky in the Southeastern Conference (SEC) during the 1992 NCAA Division I-A football season. In their third season under head coach Bill Curry, the Wildcats compiled a 4–7 record (2–6 against SEC opponents), finished in fifth place in the Eastern Division of the SEC, and were outscored by their opponents, 280 to 207. The team played its home games in Commonwealth Stadium in Lexington, Kentucky.

The team's statistical leaders included Pookie Jones with 1,434 passing yards, Terry Samuels with 380 rushing yards, and Tim Calvert with 330 receiving yards.

== Schedule ==
Date	Opponent	Site	TV	Result	Attendance	Source
September 5	Central Michigan*	Commonwealth Stadium; Lexington, KY		W 21–14	56,800	
September 12	at No. 4 Florida	Ben Hill Griffin Stadium; Gainesville, FL (rivalry)	JPS	L 19–35	84,553	
September 19	Indiana*	Commonwealth Stadium; Lexington, KY (rivalry)		W 37–25	58,450	
September 26	South Carolina	Commonwealth Stadium; Lexington, KY	JPS	W 13–9	55,700	
October 3	at Ole Miss	Vaught–Hemingway Stadium; Oxford, MS		L 14–24	31,200	
October 17	at LSU	Tiger Stadium; Baton Rouge, LA		W 27–25	57,641	
October 24	No. 7 Georgia	Commonwealth Stadium; Lexington, KY		L 7–40	58,200	
October 31	No. 24 Mississippi State	Commonwealth Stadium; Lexington, KY		L 36–37	50,375	
November 7	Vanderbilt	Commonwealth Stadium; Lexington, KY (rivalry)		L 7–20	45,350	
November 14	at Cincinnati*	Nippert Stadium; Cincinnati, OH		L 13–17	30,104	
November 21	at No. 20 Tennessee	Neyland Stadium; Knoxville, TN (rivalry)		L 13–34	94,110	
*Non-conference game; Rankings from AP Poll released prior to the game

== Personnel ==
1992 Kentucky Wildcats football team roster
Players
Coaches
Offense

Pos.	#	Name	Class
OT	76	Mark Askin	So
OT	65	Chuck Bradley	Sr
C	53	Matt Branum	Sr
WR	86	Alfonzo Browning	Jr
WR	81	Mark Chatmon	Jr
WR	95	Tim Calvert	Jr
RB		Carlos Collins
TE	83	Robert Harris	Jr
RB		Dan Hicks
WR		Troy Hobbs
QB		Ryan Hockman
RB	31	Damon Hood	So
WR	8	Kurt Johnson	Sr
QB	16	Pookie Jones	Fr
OL	57	Jody Matthews	Sr
RB		Darren Murray
QB	5	Antonio O'Ferral	Fr
TE		Neil Page
G	68	Todd Perry	Sr
OL		David Parks
RB	23	Donnie Redd	So
TE	89	Corey Reeves	So
RB		Matt Riazzi
RB		Clyde Rudolph
RB	44	Terry Samuels	Jr
RB	12	Craig Walker	Sr

Defense

Pos.	#	Name	Class
DB	1	Brad Armstead	Sr
DL	59	Zane Beehn	Jr
DL	99	Damon Betz	So
DL	92	Howard Carter
CB	33	Willie Cannon	Jr
DL		Billy Lofton
LB	45	Marty Moore	Jr
CB	38	Don Robinson
CB	24	Adrian Sherwood
LB		James Simpson
LB		Reggie Smith
LB		David Snardon
DL		Robert Stinson
SS	4	Sterling Ward
DL	42	Dean Wells	Sr
LB		Duce Williams

Special teams

Pos.	#	Name	Class
K	21	Doug Pelfrey

Head coach

- Bill Curry

Coordinators/assistant coaches

- Rick Rhoades – Offensive coordinator/ running backs
- Daryl Dickey – Quarterbacks
- Joker Phillips – Wide receivers
- Don Riley – Offensive line
- Tommy Limbaugh – Assistant head coach/tight ends/recruiting coordinator
- Larry New – Defensive coordinator/linebackers
- Bill Glaser – Defensive line
- Lovie Smith – Outside linebackers
- Rick Smith – Defensive backs

Legend

- (C) Team captain
- (S) Suspended
- (I) Ineligible
- Injured
- Redshirt
