= Alabama–Florida football rivalry =

American college football rivalry

- Alabama Crimson Tide Florida Gators
- First meeting: October 21, 1916; Alabama, 16–0
- Latest meeting: September 18, 2021; Alabama, 31–29
- Next meeting: 2027

Statistics
- Total meetings: 42
- All-time series: Alabama leads, 27–14 (1 Alabama win vacated)
- Largest victory: Alabama, 49–0 (1926)
- Longest win streak: Alabama, 8 (1964–1986) & (2009–present)
- Current win streak: Alabama, 8 (2009–present)

Locations of Alabama and Florida

The Alabama–Florida football rivalry is an American college football rivalry game between the Crimson Tide of the University of Alabama and the Gators of the University of Florida. Both schools were charter members of the Southeastern Conference (SEC) in 1933. Although Alabama and Florida played 24 times between 1916 and 1991, the rivalry did not manifest until 1992, when they competed in the first SEC Championship Game, setting a precedent for years to come which would decide both SEC and national champions.

== History ==
=== Notable games ===
==== Early years (1916–1989) ====
===== 1916: First game =====
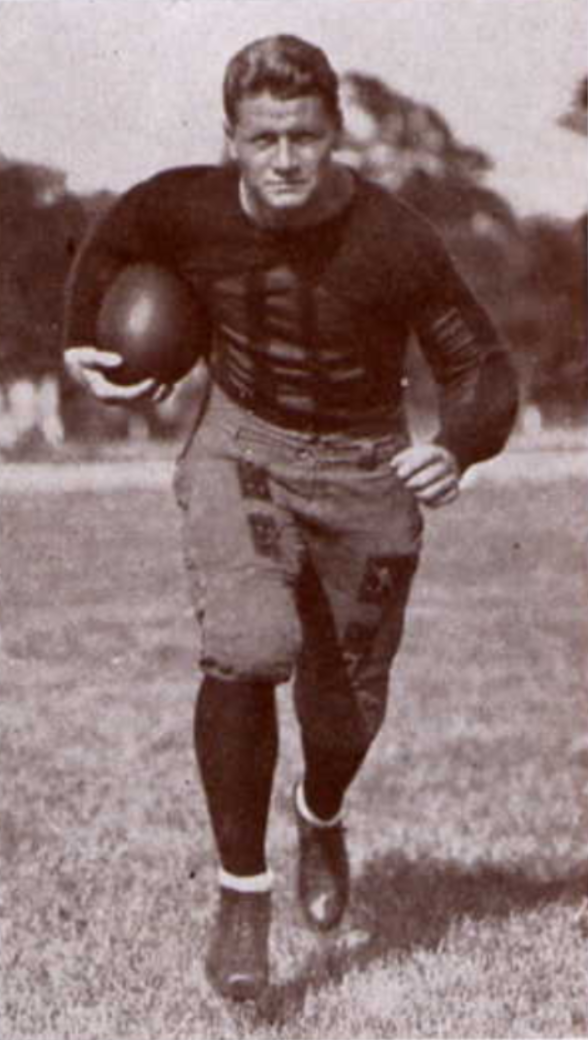
Edgar C. Jones

During the early years, games between both football teams were rare but competitive. The first meeting between Alabama and Florida was played at Fleming Field, the Gators' first on-campus stadium. Alabama won 16–0, with Cecil Creen being the star of the contest.

===== 1921: First Gators victory =====
The first-ever victory for the Florida Gators in the rivalry was a 9–2 upset at Alabama's homecoming on Denny Field in 1921, with all of Florida's points scored by Ferdinand H. Duncan.

===== 1923: Florida upsets undefeated Alabama in the rain =====
Alabama under first-year head coach Wallace Wade was undefeated, but upset in the last game of the season, in the rain, by the Florida Gators 16–6. All of the Gators' points were scored by Edgar C. Jones, and the Alabama loss gave the Southern Conference (SoCon) title to Vanderbilt, Wade's previous team.

===== 1927: Florida upsets Alabama =====
Wallace Wade

Alabama won the next 3 SoCon titles, including 2 National Championships and a Rose Bowl victory, but were upset by Florida in 1927 by a score of 13–6 in Montgomery. Florida's yearbook remarked: "The South rocked under the great Orange and Blue victory." Clyde Crabtree returned a punt 95 yards for a touchdown early in the second quarter. Crabtree also had two 55-yard kickoff returns, and gained more from scrimmage that afternoon than did the Tide, accounting for 271 yards by himself. Alabama's Molton Smith intercepted Crabtree's pass in the fourth quarter and ran for a 45-yard touchdown. After an Alabama penalty, Carl Brumbaugh ran across for the second and decisive touchdown.

===== 1930: National champion Alabama wins first game at Florida Field =====
The first ever game played at just-completed Florida Field saw Wade's last national championship Alabama team defeat Florida at homecoming 20–0. John Campbell scored two touchdowns, and John Tucker scored another.

===== 1948: First SEC game =====
They would play their first SEC game against each other in 1948 at Denny Stadium. In a close homecoming game, Alabama and Florida were neck and neck throughout the game, but Alabama pulled through to win 34–28.

===== 1964: National champion Alabama field goal wins at homecoming =====
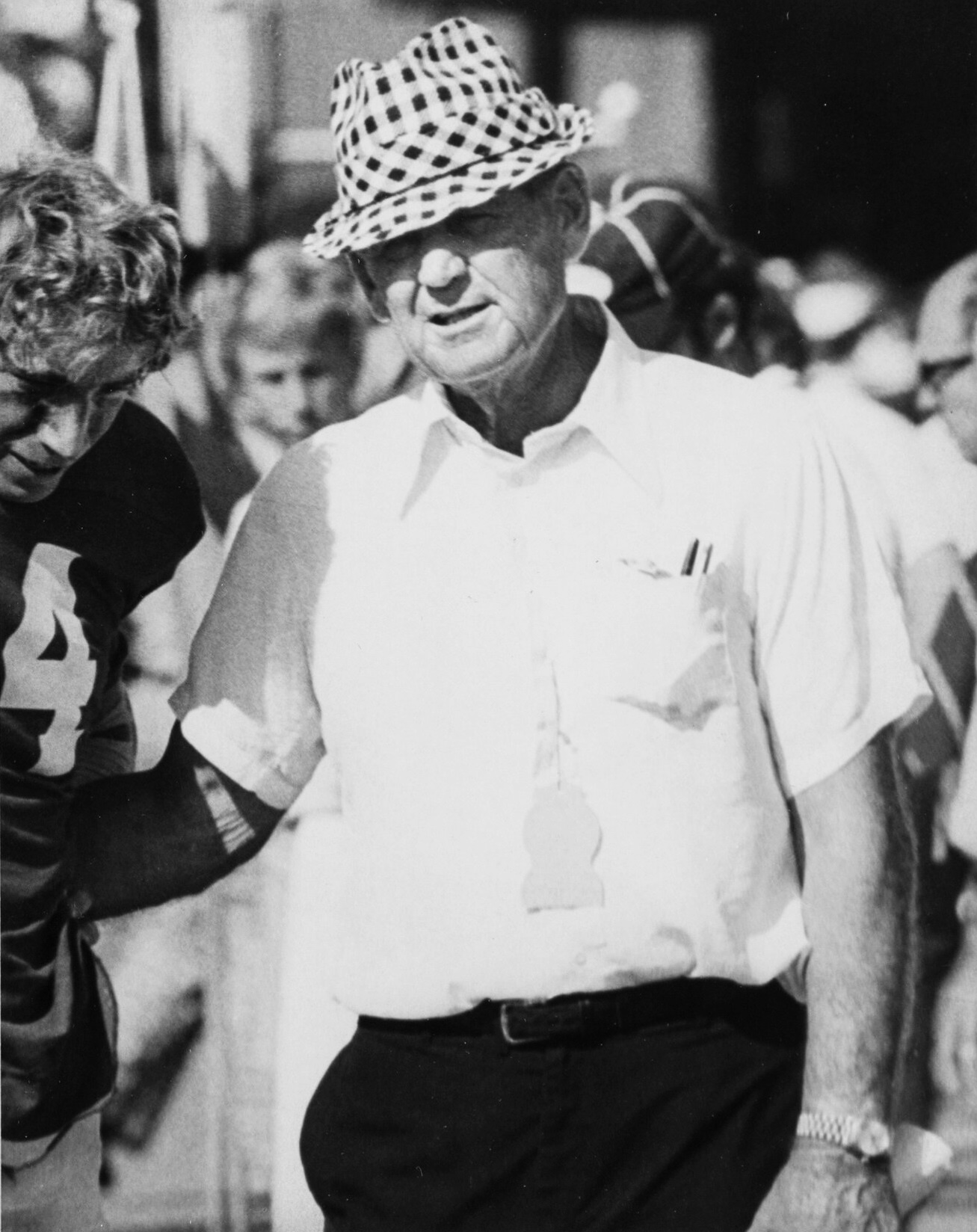
Bear Bryant

During the following decades, Alabama regularly competed for SEC titles and even won some national championships, while Florida had several lackluckster seasons with a few bowl game appearances mixed in here and there. During the 1964 season for instance, No. 3 Alabama (5–0) and No. 9 Florida (4–0) were both undefeated by Week 6 and were at the top of the conference standings. In a close homecoming game in Tuscaloosa, Alabama would score a late field goal to edge them out 17–14. Florida would end the season 3rd in the conference and unranked in the AP Poll, while Alabama, coached by Bear Bryant, would end the season as consensus national champions despite losing their bowl game against Texas.

===== 1979: National champion Alabama blows out Florida =====
In 1979, No. 2 Alabama (5–0) would shut out a winless Florida team (0–4–1) by a score of 40–0 at Florida Field in Gainesville. Alabama would finish their season undefeated with a 12–0 record, including a win in their bowl game against No. 6 Arkansas, and be recognized as consensus national champions.

===== 1987: Emmitt Smith breaks out =====
In 1986, No. 13 Florida would lose to No. 4 Alabama in Gainesville. At the rematch in Birmingham during the 1987 season, an unranked Florida started running back Emmitt Smith for the first time, who rushed for 224 yards in a defeat of No. 11 Alabama by a score of 23–14.

==== SEC Championship foes (1990–present) ====
===== 1990: Stallings vs. Spurrier =====
Gene Stallings

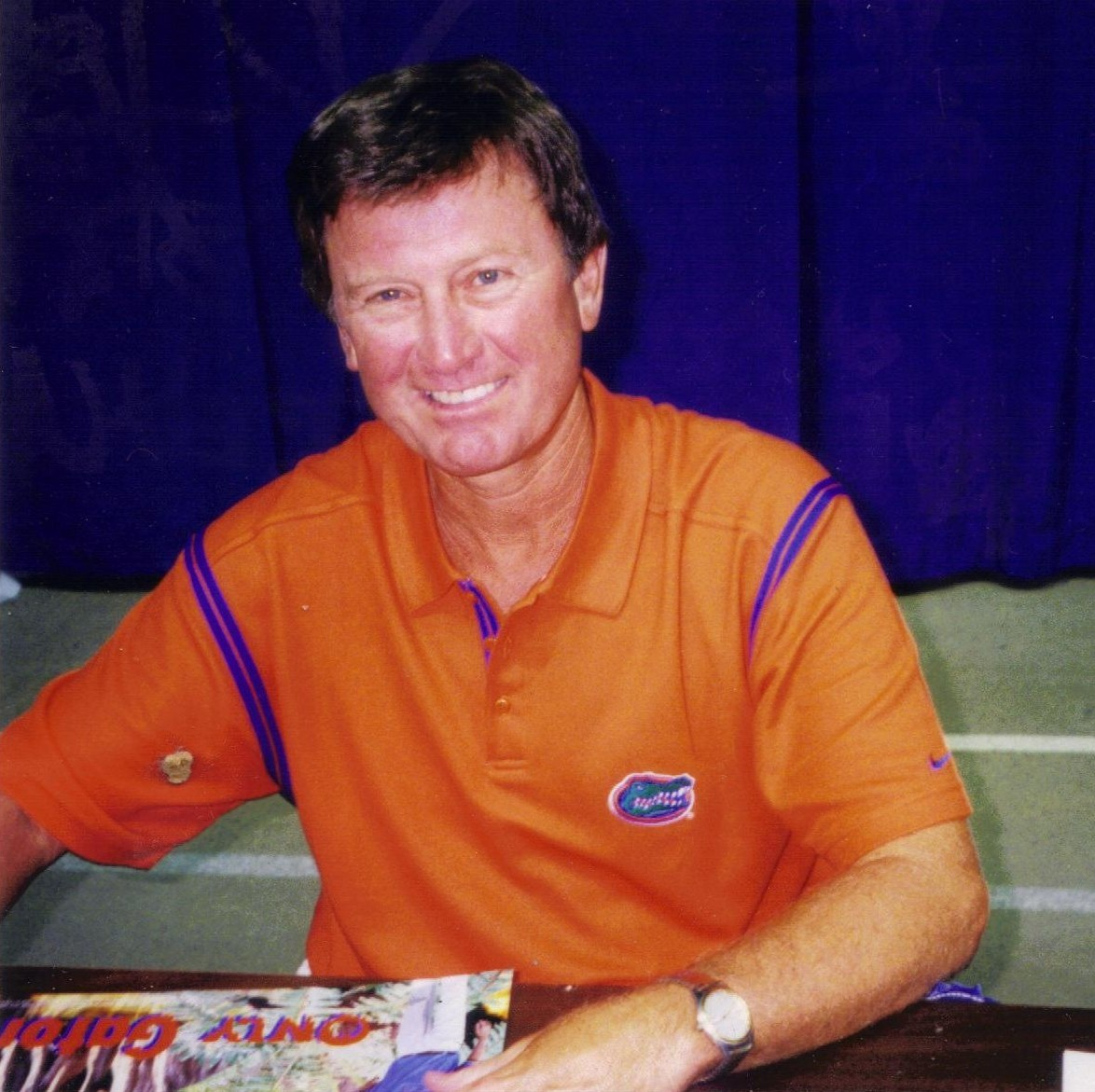
Steve Spurrier

In 1990 during the second week of the season, No. 24 Florida came from behind to beat an unranked Alabama at Tuscaloosa, 17–13. It was the first college football game played between head coaches Gene Stallings (Alabama) and Steve Spurrier (Florida). That game was thought by many to be one of the most important in the histories of the rivalry, the SEC, and college football in general as it would be a foresight for the decade and the years to come.

===== 1991: Florida crushes Alabama =====
The 1991 rematch was the final game played between both programs before the championship era. During the second week of the season, No. 6 Florida would crush No. 16 Alabama 35–0 in Gainesville, heightening the intensity of the rivalry. With that win, Florida would narrowly win the SEC title over Alabama, therefore winning their first conference championship in program history, after being forced to vacate their 1984 championship. Despite this, Alabama would finish fifth in the AP Poll and win their bowl game against Colorado, while Florida finished seventh and lost their bowl game to Notre Dame.

===== 1992: Alabama wins first SEC championship game =====
Starting in 1992, the SEC would expand to 12 teams with the addition of Arkansas and South Carolina. The 12 teams were divided into 2 divisions (6 teams each), creating a football championship game between the top two teams in each division. They were the first Division I-A conference to do so. Since the start of the conference title game, both Alabama and Florida have each made it 13 times, with ten of those games being against each other. Alabama has won the championship game nine times, while Florida has won seven times. Several of those ten championship matchups decided who would compete for the national title game.

In the 1992 season, Alabama and Florida would finish at the top of the Western and Eastern Divisions, respectfully. Alabama entered the first conference title game ranked No. 2 in the country with an undefeated 11–0 record and a chance to compete for the national championship, while Florida came with an 8–3 record and a No. 12 AP Poll ranking. In an extremely close match, Alabama would win 28–21 following a late touchdown in the fourth quarter, securing the first SEC title won by championship game. Following the game, Florida would win their bowl game against No. 12 NC State and finished No. 10 in the polls. Alabama, on the other hand, won their bowl game against No. 1 Miami (FL), earning them their first national championship since 1979.

===== 1993: Florida wins second SEC championship game =====
The next season in 1993, Florida and Alabama (ranked No. 9 and No. 16 respectively) would compete in the conference title game yet again; however, Florida would come out on top 28–13, winning their second SEC title in history.

===== 1994: Florida repeats as SEC champions by one point =====
In 1994, Florida and Alabama would meet in the conference championship game yet again, and Florida edged a victory, 24–23.

===== 1996: National champion Florida wins SEC championship =====
They would meet again in the 1996 showdown, the last matchup between Stallings and Spurrier. Florida, who would eventually compete and win a national championship, defeated Alabama 45–30.

===== 1998: Florida beats Alabama, both teams use 2 quarterbacks =====
Alabama and Florida wouldn't meet in 1997, but played again in Week 5 of the 1998 season. In Tuscaloosa, No. 8 Florida would defeat an unranked Alabama team 16–10. The game was sealed by a Tony George interception. Both teams used a two-quarterback system, Florida with Doug Johnson and Jesse Palmer; and Alabama with John David Phillips and Andrew Zow.

===== 1999: Alabama upsets Florida in overtime, wins SEC championship in rematch =====
A year later in 1999, this time in Gainesville, No. 21 Alabama would beat No. 3 Florida, 40–39 in overtime. Both teams would eventually finish at the top of their divisions and compete in the SEC championship. In the rematch, Alabama would beat Florida again, but this time by a score of 34–7.

===== 2005: Alabama's vacated win over Meyer =====
The teams would not meet again until 2005, during the first season of Urban Meyer's tenure at Florida. Alabama would beat Florida 31–3, but the NCAA would later vacate all of the wins for Alabama's 2005 season due to multiple rules violations committed during that time.

===== 2006: National champion Florida defeats Alabama =====
Alabama and Florida would meet again in 2006 (during the Florida football program's 100th anniversary) and Florida would top Alabama 28–13. Florida would go on to win the conference championship (beating Arkansas) and win the national championship after defeating Ohio State, winning their second ever national championship.

===== 2008: Saban vs. Meyer, National champion Florida wins SEC championship =====
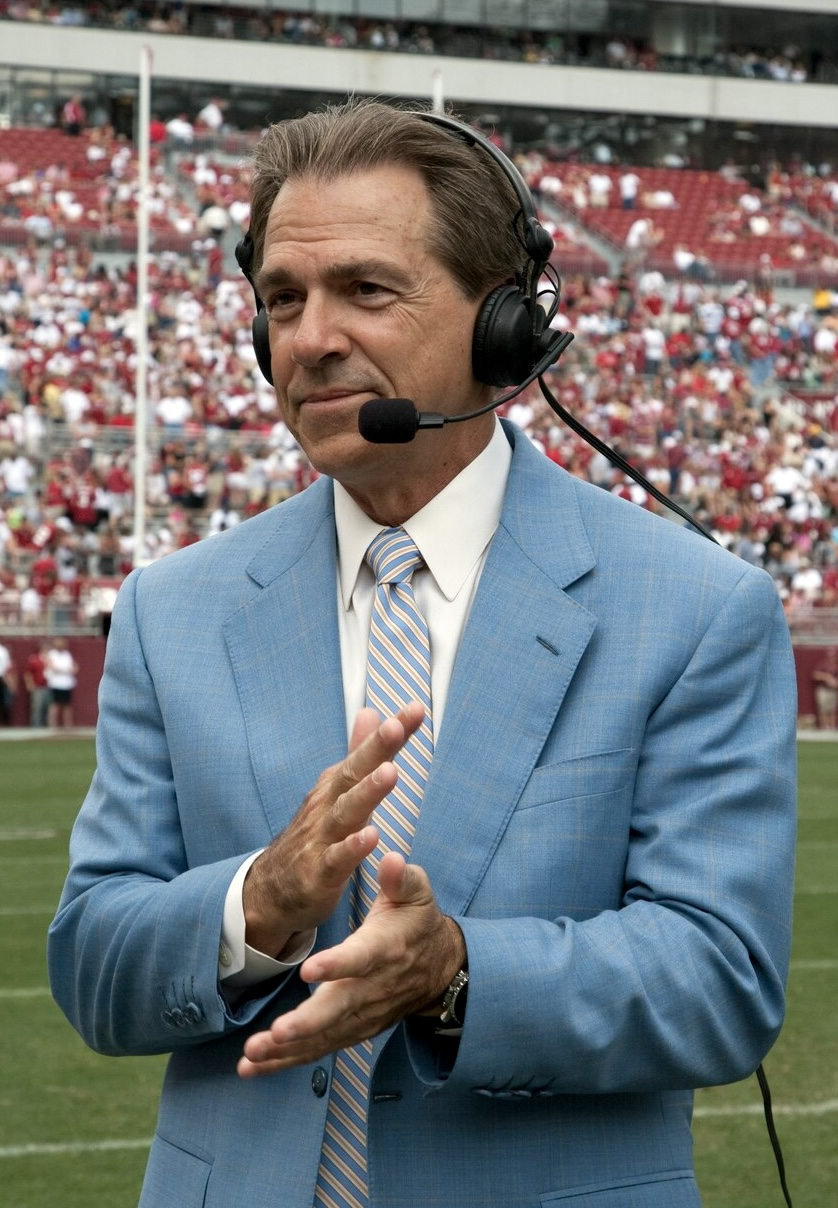
Nick Saban

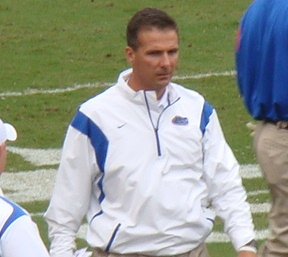
Urban Meyer

After down years in 2007, both teams had great regular seasons in 2008 and finished at the top of their respective divisions, earning them spots in the conference title game. Heading into the contest, Florida was ranked No. 2 while Alabama was ranked No. 1, granting the winner of the game a spot in the national championship game. The game, which featured a head-to-head battle of coaches Nick Saban and Urban Meyer was competitive, but Florida, led by second year starting quarterback Tim Tebow (who would win the Heisman that season), would beat Alabama 31–20 to win the championship.

===== 2009: Saban vs. Meyer II, National champion Alabama wins SEC championship =====
In 2009, both teams again had dominant regular seasons and finished at the top of their divisions with undefeated 12–0 records. At the time, Alabama was ranked No. 2 in the polls, while Florida was ranked No. 1, which would again mean the winner would secure a spot in the national championship. In the conference championship, Alabama would dominate the game and beat Florida 32–13. Alabama would go on to beat Texas 37–21 in the national championship, winning their first national championship in 17 years.

===== 2010: =====
In 2010, Alabama and Florida met in a regular season showdown in Week 5 of the season. Alabama would beat Florida 31–6.

===== 2011: =====
They would meet again a year later in 2011. Both teams were ranked in the polls, but Alabama would defeat Florida 38–10.

===== 2014: Alabama beats Florida easy =====
The teams did not meet in the 2012 or 2013 seasons, but they would schedule a showdown for Week 4 of the 2014 season, where Alabama would blowout Florida 42–21.

===== 2015: Derrick Henry stars in SEC championship game =====
In 2015, both teams finished at the top of their divisions and met in the 2015 SEC Championship Game. Florida were No. 18 in the rankings, while Alabama were No. 2, essentially determining whether Alabama would compete in the College Football Playoff. Following a dominant performance from running back Derrick Henry, Alabama would win the game 29–15.

===== 2016: Alabama blows out Florida to win SEC championship =====
In 2016, both teams would finish at the top of their divisions again. In another back-to-back championship game showdown, No. 1 Alabama would blowout No. 15 Florida 54–16.

===== 2020: Alabama wins SEC championship =====
The next match-up between both programs would be four years later in 2020, when both teams finished at the top of their respective divisions with above average records. The 2020 SEC Championship Game was the 10th conference championship game played between Alabama and Florida, and the 13th conference championship appearance for both programs. In one of the highest-scoring affairs, Alabama would beat Florida 52–46, guaranteeing them a spot in the College Football Playoff.

===== 2021: Alabama holds off Florida comeback =====
In the following season, both teams met for the first time in the regular season since 2014, and Alabama's first trip to Gainesville since 2011. Alabama started the first quarter with a 21–3 lead, although Florida came back but fell short, 31–29, due to a missed PAT and a failed two-point conversion.

== Game results ==
Alabama victories	Florida victories	Tie games

No.	Date	Location	Winning team		Losing team	
1	October 21, 1916	Gainesville, FL	Alabama	16	Florida	0
2	November 11, 1921	Tuscaloosa, AL	Florida	9	Alabama	2
3	November 29, 1923	Birmingham, AL	Florida	16	Alabama	6
4	November 14, 1925	Montgomery, AL	Alabama	34	Florida	0
5	November 13, 1926	Montgomery, AL	Alabama	49	Florida	0
6	November 12, 1927	Montgomery, AL	Florida	13	Alabama	6
7	November 8, 1930	Gainesville, FL	Alabama	20	Florida	0
8	November 7, 1931	Birmingham, AL	Alabama	41	Florida	0
9	November 27, 1948	Tuscaloosa, AL	Alabama	34	Florida	28
10	November 26, 1949	Gainesville, FL	Alabama	35	Florida	13
11	November 25, 1950	Gainesville, FL	#17 Alabama	41	Florida	13
12	November 24, 1951	Tuscaloosa, AL	Florida	30	Alabama	21
13	October 12, 1963	Tuscaloosa, AL	Florida	10	#3 Alabama	6
14	October 24, 1964	Tuscaloosa, AL	#3 Alabama	17	#9 Florida	14
15	September 26, 1970	Tuscaloosa, AL	Alabama	46	#13 Florida	15
16	September 25, 1971	Gainesville, FL	#8 Alabama	38	Florida	0
17	October 14, 1972	Tuscaloosa, AL	#3 Alabama	24	Florida	7
18	October 13, 1973	Gainesville, FL	#3 Alabama	35	Florida	14
19	October 14, 1978	Tuscaloosa, AL	#7 Alabama	23	Florida	12
20	October 13, 1979	Gainesville, FL	#2 Alabama	40	Florida	0
21	September 20, 1986	Gainesville, FL	#4 Alabama	21	#13 Florida	7
22	September 19, 1987	Birmingham, AL	Florida	23	#11 Alabama	14

No.	Date	Location	Winning team		Losing team	
23	September 15, 1990	Tuscaloosa, AL	#24 Florida	17	Alabama	13
24	September 14, 1991	Gainesville, FL	#6 Florida	35	#16 Alabama	0
25	December 5, 1992*	Birmingham, AL	#2 Alabama	28	#12 Florida	21
26	December 4, 1993*	Birmingham, AL	#9 Florida	28	#16 Alabama	13
27	December 3, 1994*	Atlanta, GA	#6 Florida	24	#3 Alabama	23
28	December 7, 1996*	Atlanta, GA	#4 Florida	45	#11 Alabama	30
29	October 3, 1998	Tuscaloosa, AL	#8 Florida	16	Alabama	10
30	October 2, 1999	Gainesville, FL	#21 Alabama	40	#3 Florida	39^{OT}
31	December 4, 1999*	Atlanta, GA	#7 Alabama	34	#5 Florida	7
32	October 1, 2005 ‡	Tuscaloosa, AL	#15 Alabama	31	#5 Florida	3
33	September 30, 2006	Gainesville, FL	#5 Florida	28	Alabama	13
34	December 6, 2008*	Atlanta, GA	#2 Florida	31	#1 Alabama	20
35	December 5, 2009*	Atlanta, GA	#2 Alabama	32	#1 Florida	13
36	October 2, 2010	Tuscaloosa, AL	#1 Alabama	31	#7 Florida	6
37	October 1, 2011	Gainesville, FL	#3 Alabama	38	#12 Florida	10
38	September 20, 2014	Tuscaloosa, AL	#3 Alabama	42	Florida	21
39	December 5, 2015*	Atlanta, GA	#2 Alabama	29	#18 Florida	15
40	December 3, 2016*	Atlanta, GA	#1 Alabama	54	#15 Florida	16
41	December 19, 2020*	Atlanta, GA	#1 Alabama	52	#11 Florida	46
42	September 18, 2021	Gainesville, FL	#1 Alabama	31	#11 Florida	29
Series: Alabama leads 27–14
* indicates SEC Championship Game ‡ Alabama's 2005 win was vacated due to NCAA penalties.

=== Locations ===
As of November 12, 2023

State	City	Games	Alabama victories	Florida victories	Years played
Alabama	Tuscaloosa	13	7	5	1921, 1948, 1951–present
Alabama	Birmingham	5	2	3	1923, 1931, 1987, 1992–93
Alabama	Montgomery	3	2	1	1925–27
Florida	Gainesville	13	11	2	1916–present
Georgia	Atlanta	8	5	3	1994–present

=== Record by game type ===
Game type	Games	Alabama victories	Florida victories
Regular Season	32	21	10
SEC Championship	10	6	4

== Coaching records ==
As of November 16, 2023

=== Alabama ===
Head Coach	Games	Seasons	Wins	Losses	Win %
Nick Saban	9	2007–2023	8	1	0.889
Mike Shula	2	2003–2006	0	2	0.000
Mike DuBose	3	1997–2000	2	1	0.667
Gene Stallings	6	1990–1996	1	5	0.167
Bill Curry	1	1987–1989	0	1	0.000
Ray Perkins	1	1983–1986	1	0	1.000
Bear Bryant	8	1958–1982	7	1	0.875
Harold Drew	4	1947–1954	3	1	0.750
Frank Thomas	1	1931–1946	1	0	1.000
Wallace Wade	5	1923–1930	3	2	0.600
Xen Scott	1	1919–1922	0	1	0.000
Thomas Kelley	1	1915–1917	1	0	1.000

=== Florida ===
Head Coach	Games	Seasons	Wins	Losses	Win %
Dan Mullen	2	2018–2021	0	2	0.000
Jim McElwain	2	2015–2017	0	2	0.000
Will Muschamp	2	2011–2014	0	2	0.000
Urban Meyer	5	2005–2010	2	3	0.400
Steve Spurrier	9	1990–2001	6	3	0.667
Galen Hall	2	1984–1989	1	1	0.500
Charley Pell	1	1979–1984	0	1	0.000
Doug Dickey	5	1970–1978	0	5	0.000
Ray Graves	2	1960–1969	1	1	0.500
Bob Woodruff	2	1950–1959	1	1	0.500
Raymond Wolf	2	1946–1949	0	2	0.000
Charlie Bachman	2	1928–1932	0	2	0.000
Harold Sebring	3	1925–1927	1	2	0.333
James Van Fleet	1	1923–1924	1	0	1.000
William G. Kline	1	1920–1922	1	0	1.000
C.J. McCoy	1	1914–1916	0	1	0.000

== See also ==
- List of NCAA college football rivalry games
