= 1992 South Carolina Gamecocks football team =

American college football season

1992 South Carolina Gamecocks football
- Conference: Southeastern Conference
- Eastern Division
- Record: 5–6 (3–5 SEC)
- Head coach: Sparky Woods (4th season)
- Offensive coordinator: Art Wilkins (4th season)
- Defensive coordinator: Tommy West (2nd season)
- Home stadium: Williams–Brice Stadium

1992 Southeastern Conference football standings
| | Conf. | | | | | Overall |
| Team | W | | L | | T | W | | L | | T |
|---|---|---|---|---|---|---|---|---|---|---|
Eastern Division
| No. 10 Florida xy | 6 | – | 2 | – | 0 | 9 | – | 4 | – | 0 |
| No. 8 Georgia x | 6 | – | 2 | – | 0 | 10 | – | 2 | – | 0 |
| No. 12 Tennessee | 5 | – | 3 | – | 0 | 9 | – | 3 | – | 0 |
| South Carolina | 3 | – | 5 | – | 0 | 5 | – | 6 | – | 0 |
| Vanderbilt | 2 | – | 6 | – | 0 | 4 | – | 7 | – | 0 |
| Kentucky | 2 | – | 6 | – | 0 | 4 | – | 7 | – | 0 |
Western Division
| No. 1 Alabama x$ | 8 | – | 0 | – | 0 | 13 | – | 0 | – | 0 |
| No. 16 Ole Miss | 5 | – | 3 | – | 0 | 9 | – | 3 | – | 0 |
| No. 23 Mississippi State | 4 | – | 4 | – | 0 | 7 | – | 5 | – | 0 |
| Arkansas | 3 | – | 4 | – | 1 | 3 | – | 7 | – | 1 |
| Auburn | 2 | – | 5 | – | 1 | 5 | – | 5 | – | 1 |
| LSU | 1 | – | 7 | – | 0 | 2 | – | 9 | – | 0 |
Championship: Alabama 28, Florida 21
$ – Conference champion; x – Division champion/co-champions; y – Championship game participant; Rankings from AP Poll

The 1992 South Carolina Gamecocks football team represented the University of South Carolina in the 1992 NCAA Division I-A football season. This was the first season for the Gamecocks as a member of the Southeastern Conference (SEC). In 1992, the SEC expanded to twelve teams and two divisions with South Carolina placed in the SEC East Division. The Gamecocks were led by Sparky Woods, in his fourth season as head coach, and finished the season with a 5–6 record. They played their home games at Williams–Brice Stadium.

After beginning the season 0–5, freshman Steve Taneyhill assumed the starting quarterback position and led the Gamecocks to a 5–1 finish, with wins vs. ranked foes Mississippi State and Tennessee.

== Schedule ==
| Date | Time | Opponent | Site | TV | Result | Attendance | Source |
|---|---|---|---|---|---|---|---|
| September 5 | 8:00 p.m. | No. 14 Georgia | Williams–Brice Stadium; Columbia, SC (rivalry) | WIS | L 6–28 | 75,060 | |
| September 12 | 7:00 p.m. | Arkansas | Williams–Brice Stadium; Columbia, SC | | L 7–45 | 63,100 | |
| September 19 | 7:00 p.m. | East Carolina* | Williams–Brice Stadium; Columbia, SC | | L 18–20 | 60,030 | |
| September 26 | 12:30 p.m. | at Kentucky | Commonwealth Stadium; Lexington, KY | JPS | L 9–13 | 55,700 | |
| October 3 | 3:30 p.m. | at No. 9 Alabama | Bryant–Denny Stadium; Tuscaloosa, AL | PPV | L 7–48 | 70,123 | |
| October 17 | 12:30 p.m. | No. 15 Mississippi State | Williams–Brice Stadium; Columbia, SC | JPS | W 21–6 | 55,102 | |
| October 24 | 2:00 p.m. | at Vanderbilt | Vanderbilt Stadium; Nashville, TN | | W 21–17 | 40,900 | |
| October 31 | 12:30 p.m. | No. 16 Tennessee | Williams–Brice Stadium; Columbia, SC (rivalry) | JPS | W 24–23 | 71,529 | |
| November 7 | 1:00 p.m. | Louisiana Tech* | Williams–Brice Stadium; Columbia, SC | | W 14–13 | 57,547 | |
| November 14 | 12:30 p.m. | at No. 11 Florida | Ben Hill Griffin Stadium; Gainesville, FL | JPS | L 9–14 | 84,777 | |
| November 21 | 12:00 p.m. | at Clemson* | Memorial Stadium; Clemson, SC (rivalry) | JPS | W 24–13 | 83,312 | |
*Non-conference game; Rankings from AP Poll released prior to the game; All times are in Eastern time

== Roster ==
1968 South Carolina Gamecocks football team roster
Players
Coaches
Offense

| Pos. | # | Name | Class |
|---|---|---|---|
| RB | 33 | Brandon Bennett |
| TE | 86 | Matt Campbell |
| WR | | Toby Cates |
| WR | | Don Chaney |
| FB | | Rob DeBoer |
| OL | | James Dexter |
| OT | 65 | Ernest Dye |
| TE | | Boomer Foster |
| OL | | Delvin Herring |
| OT | | Corey Louchiey |
| WR | | Asim Penny |
| RB | | Stanley Pritchett |
| QB | 18 | Steve Taneyhill |
| QB | | Blake Williamson |
| OT | | Kevin Rosenkrans |

Defense

| Pos. | # | Name | Class |
|---|---|---|---|
| CB | 21 | Frank Adams |
| LB | | Aubrey Brooks |
| LB | | Hank Campbell |
| CB | | Rocky Clay |
| LB | 40 | Ernest Dixon |
| LB | | Lawrence Mitchell |
| LB | | Chris Rumph |
| DT | | Eric Sullivan |
| DE | | David Turnipseed |
| DB | | Tony Watkins |
| S | | Norman Greene |

Special teams

| Pos. | # | Name | Class |
|---|---|---|---|
| K | | Marty Simpson |
| P | 8 | Derwin Jeffcoat |

Head coach

- Paul Dietzel

Coordinators/assistant coaches

Legend

- (C) Team captain
- (S) Suspended
- (I) Ineligible
- Injured
- Redshirt
