= 1992 Alabama Crimson Tide football team =

American college football season

1992 Alabama Crimson Tide football

Consensus national champion SEC champion SEC Western Division champion Sugar Bowl champion

SEC Championship Game, W 28–21 vs. Florida

Sugar Bowl (BC NCG), W 34–13 vs. Miami (FL)
- Conference: Southeastern Conference
- Western Division

Ranking
- Coaches: No. 1
- AP: No. 1
- Record: 13–0 (9–0 SEC)
- Head coach: Gene Stallings (3rd season)
- Offensive coordinator: Mal Moore (11th season)
- Offensive scheme: Pro-style
- Base defense: 3–4 or 4–3
- Captains: Prince Wimbley; George Wilson; Derrick Oden; George Teague
- Home stadium: Bryant–Denny Stadium; Legion Field

1992 Southeastern Conference football standings
	Conf.					Overall
Team	W		L		T	W		L		T
Eastern Division
No. 10 Florida xy	6	–	2	–	0	9	–	4	–	0
No. 8 Georgia x	6	–	2	–	0	10	–	2	–	0
No. 12 Tennessee	5	–	3	–	0	9	–	3	–	0
South Carolina	3	–	5	–	0	5	–	6	–	0
Vanderbilt	2	–	6	–	0	4	–	7	–	0
Kentucky	2	–	6	–	0	4	–	7	–	0
Western Division
No. 1 Alabama x$	8	–	0	–	0	13	–	0	–	0
No. 16 Ole Miss	5	–	3	–	0	9	–	3	–	0
No. 23 Mississippi State	4	–	4	–	0	7	–	5	–	0
Arkansas	3	–	4	–	1	3	–	7	–	1
Auburn	2	–	5	–	1	5	–	5	–	1
LSU	1	–	7	–	0	2	–	9	–	0
Championship: Alabama 28, Florida 21
$ – Conference champion; x – Division champion/co-champions; y – Championship game participant; Rankings from AP Poll

The 1992 Alabama Crimson Tide football team represented the University of Alabama as a member of the Western Division of the Southeastern Conference (SEC) during the 1992 NCAA Division I-A football season. This was the team's third season under head coach Gene Stallings. They played their home games at both Bryant–Denny Stadium in Tuscaloosa, Alabama and Legion Field in Birmingham, Alabama. They finished the season undefeated with a record of 13–0 (8–0 in the SEC) and as national champions. The team was noted especially for its strong defense, which led the nation in fewest points allowed (9.2 per game during the regular season) and, in a strong bowl game performance, prevented defending national champion Miami from scoring an offensive touchdown.

The 1992 Crimson Tide won their 20th SEC title by defeating the Florida Gators 28–21 on December 5 in the inaugural SEC Championship Game. The team then capped off Alabama's eighth perfect season by winning the 1992 national football championship, defeating the heavily favored Miami Hurricanes 34–13 in the 1993 Sugar Bowl on January 1, 1993, a matchup resulting from the first ever Bowl Coalition national championship game. This was the last national championship won by the Tide until 2009.

Alabama celebrated 100 years of football in the 1992 season.

== Schedule ==
Date	Time	Opponent	Rank	Site	TV	Result	Attendance	Source
September 5	11:30 a.m.	Vanderbilt	No. 9	Bryant–Denny Stadium; Tuscaloosa, AL	JPS	W 25–8	70,123	
September 12	4:00 p.m.	Southern Miss*	No. 8	Legion Field; Birmingham, AL	VideoSeat	W 17–10	83,091	
September 19	7:00 p.m.	at Arkansas	No. 9	War Memorial Stadium; Little Rock, AR	VideoSeat	W 38–11	55,912	
September 26	1:30 p.m.	Louisiana Tech*	No. 7	Legion Field; Birmingham, AL	VideoSeat	W 13–0	77,622	
October 3	2:30 p.m.	South Carolina^{†}	No. 9	Bryant–Denny Stadium; Tuscaloosa, AL	VideoSeat	W 48–7	70,123	
October 10	7:00 p.m.	at Tulane*	No. 6	Louisiana Superdome; New Orleans, LA	VideoSeat	W 37–0	50,240	
October 17	2:30 p.m.	at No. 13 Tennessee	No. 4	Neyland Stadium; Knoxville, TN (Third Saturday in October)	ABC	W 17–10	97,388	
October 24	11:30 a.m.	Ole Miss	No. 4	Bryant–Denny Stadium; Tuscaloosa, AL (rivalry)	JPS	W 31–10	70,123	
November 7	2:30 p.m.	at LSU	No. 3	Tiger Stadium; Baton Rouge, LA (rivalry)	ABC	W 31–11	76,813	
November 14	6:30 p.m.	at No. 16 Mississippi State	No. 2	Scott Field; Starkville, MS (rivalry)	ESPN	W 30–21	41,320	
November 26	Noon	Auburn	No. 2	Legion Field; Birmingham, AL (Iron Bowl)	ABC	W 17–0	83,091	
December 5	2:30 p.m.	vs. No. 12 Florida	No. 2	Legion Field; Birmingham, AL (SEC Championship Game, rivalry)	ABC	W 28–21	83,091	
January 1, 1993	7:30 p.m.	vs. No. 1 Miami (FL)*	No. 2	Louisiana Superdome; New Orleans, LA (Sugar Bowl)	ABC	W 34–13	76,789	
*Non-conference game; ^{†}Homecoming; Rankings from AP Poll released prior to the game; All times are in Central time

== Rankings ==
Ranking movements Legend: ██ Increase in ranking ██ Decrease in ranking ( ) = First-place votes
	Week																
Poll	Pre	1	2	3	4	5	6	7	8	9	10	11	12	13	14	15	Final
AP	9 (1)	9 (1)	8 (1)	9 (1)	7 (1)	9 (1)	6 (1)	4 (1)	4 (1)	4 (1)	3 (1)	2 (1)	2 (1)	2 (1)	2 (1)	2 (1)	1 (62)
Coaches	9	9	8	9	8	9	7	5	4	4	3	2 (1)	2 (1)	2	2	2	1 (60)

== Game summaries ==
=== Vanderbilt ===
Team	1	2	3	4	Total
Vanderbilt	0	0	8	0	8
• # 9 Alabama	9	7	0	9	25

- Date: September 5
- Location: Bryant–Denny Stadium
  Tuscaloosa, AL
- Game start: 11:30 am CDT
- Game attendance: 70,123
- Game weather: 84, Partly Sunny, Wind S @ 3-5 mph
- Television network: JPS

Scoring summary
Q1	8:17	UA	Michael Proctor 46-yard field goal	UA 3-0
Q1	7:03	UA	Michael Proctor 43-yard field goal	UA 6-0
Q1	2:21	UA	Michael Proctor 42-yard field goal	UA 9-0
Q2	11:01	UA	Derrick Lassic 4-yard run (Michael Proctor kick)	UA 16-0
Q3	7:53	VU	Royce Love 5-yard run (Eric Lewis run)	UA 16-8
Q4	7:42	UA	Michael Proctor 32-yard field goal	UA 19-8
Q4	1:59	UA	Michael Rodgers 36-yard interception return (PAT blocked)	UA 25-8

In the opener, freshman Michael Proctor kicked four field goals and Alabama defeated Vanderbilt 25–8 despite the absence of star WR/KR David Palmer, then serving a suspension for a drunk driving arrest. One Alabama touchdown came after Tide pressure caused the Vanderbilt punter to fumble the ball at his team's 6-yard line and the other came on an interception return in the fourth quarter.

Statistics

Statistics	Vanderbilt	Alabama
First downs	15	15
Total yards	210	289
Passing yards	72	185
Rushing yards	138	104
Penalties	4-35	3-15
Turnovers	6	2
Time of possession	35:14	24:46

Team	Category	Player	Statistics
Vanderbilt	Passing	David Lawrence	1-1, 41 yards
Vanderbilt	Rushing	Eric Lewis	8 carries, 37 yards
Vanderbilt	Receiving	Brandon Berry	2 receptions, 15 yards
Alabama	Passing	Jay Barker	14-27, 185 yards, 1 INT
Alabama	Rushing	Derrick Lassic	9 carries, 51 yards, 1 TD
Alabama	Receiving	Kevin Lee	3 receptions, 78 yards

=== Southern Mississippi ===
Team	1	2	3	4	Total
Southern Miss	0	0	10	0	10
• #8 Alabama	7	0	3	7	17

- Date: September 12
- Location: Legion Field
  Birmingham, AL
- Game start: 4:00 pm CDT
- Game attendance: 83,091
- Game weather: 84, Partly Cloudy, Wind N @ 3-5 mph

Scoring summary
Q1	11:18	UA	Tommy Johnson 73-yard pass from Bryne Diehl (Michael Proctor kick)	UA 7-0
Q3	13:52	USM	Bobby Hamilton 18-yard interception return (Lance Nations kick)	Tied 7-7
Q3	11:29	USM	Lance Nations 33-yard field goal	USM 10-7
Q3	0:31	UA	Michael Proctor 25-yard field goal	Tied 10-10
Q4	10:19	UA	Chris Anderson 1-yard run (Michael Proctor kick)	UA 17-10

Alabama held the Golden Eagles to only 54 yards of total offense and three first downs. Alabama had 383 yards total offense, but lost two fumbles and an interception and struggled to score. Alabama's only TD in the first half came on a fake punt. When the Golden Eagles tipped a pass by Alabama quarterback Jay Barker in the air in the third quarter, intercepted it, and ran it back 18 yards for a touchdown, the game was tied 7–7. On the next possession, Alabama fumbled the ball away to Southern Mississippi at its own 18-yard-line. After the Golden Eagles subsequently kicked a field goal, they led 10–7 despite a total inability to move the ball on offense. It was the first of only four times all year that Alabama trailed in a game. Towards the end of the third quarter, Southern Miss returned the turnover favors, fumbling the ball away to Alabama at its own 20. Michael Proctor's field goal tied the game up with 38 seconds to go in the third. Finally, in the fourth quarter, Alabama put together its only sustained drive of the game, a 63-yard march that ended with a 1-yard Chris Anderson TD. Alabama won, 17–10.

Statistics

Statistics	Southern Miss	Alabama
First downs	3	19
Total yards	54	383
Passing yards	26	200
Rushing yards	28	183
Penalties	10-81	9-78
Turnovers	2	3
Time of possession	23:47	36:13

Team	Category	Player	Statistics
Southern Miss	Passing	Tommy Waters	7-19, 26 yards, 1 INT
Southern Miss	Rushing	Dwayne Nelson	8 carries, 28 yards
Southern Miss	Receiving	Marcus Pope	1 receptions, 14 yards
Alabama	Passing	Jay Barker	13-21, 127 yards, 1 INT
Alabama	Rushing	Chris Anderson	15 carries, 67 yards, 1 TD
Alabama	Receiving	Tommy Johnson	1 receptions, 73 yards, 1 TD

=== At Arkansas ===
New SEC member Arkansas (the Razorbacks joined the conference along with the South Carolina Gamecocks for the 1992 season) proved no match for the Tide. Derrick Lassic scored on a 33-yard TD run on Alabama's first play from scrimmage, the Tide was up 28–0 halfway through the second quarter, and from there Alabama cruised to a 38–11 victory. Jay Barker threw for 192 yards and three touchdown passes, and Alabama had 467 yards in total offense. Arkansas governor and Democratic presidential candidate Bill Clinton was in attendance.

=== Louisiana Tech ===
Alabama had its worst offensive game of the season against Louisiana Tech. The Tide mustered only 167 yards of offense in the game. In the first quarter, a drive to the Tech 19 ended in a field goal. In the second Bama started a possession on the Louisiana Tech 30 after a short punt and a penalty, but again could muster only a field goal. In the third Tech nearly took the lead after a 62-yard pass completion (more than half of their 117 yards total offense for the entire game) advanced the ball to the Alabama 9, but the Bulldogs could not punch it into the end zone and a field goal attempt missed. In the fourth quarter, with Alabama still clinging to a 6–0 lead, David Palmer ran a punt back 63 yards for a touchdown, making the final score 13–0. It was his first game after sitting out the first three games of the season due to his drunk driving arrest.

=== South Carolina ===
The other new arrival to the SEC proved to be even less of a challenge. By the time South Carolina got its first 1st down, late in the second quarter, Alabama was ahead 38–0. Alabama gave almost all of its starters the second half off, and still managed to rack up 485 yards of total offense while limiting USC to one touchdown and nine first downs. The Tide won 48–7.

=== At Tulane ===
One year after Alabama annihilated the Green Wave 62–0, Tulane put up stiffer resistance against the Tide, in the first half at least. Alabama penetrated inside the Tulane 25 three times in the first half but came away with only two field goals. Tulane lost a touchdown when the lineman carrying the ball on a fumblerooski touched his knee to the ground as he picked the ball up. A third field goal put Alabama up 9–0 in the third, and after another Tulane drive ended in an interception at the Tide 2, Alabama pulled away, scoring four touchdowns in the third and fourth quarters to win 37–0.

=== At No. 13 Tennessee ===
Alabama dominated the Third Saturday in October matchup with Tennessee, outgaining the Vols 355 yards (301 on the ground) to 194, but nearly blew the game late after taking a 17–0 second quarter lead. Proctor missed two field goals, then, late in the third, Bama had the ball up 17–3 and with a 4th and goal at the Tennessee 2. Coach Stallings elected to go for it, but Derrick Lassic was tackled for a 1-yard loss. Heath Shuler's touchdown pass with 12:53 to go cut the deficit to 17–10, and a Tide fumble at the Tennessee 48 with 1:33 left gave UT one last chance. However, Shuler threw an interception two plays later and the Crimson Tide escaped with a victory, its seventh in a row over Tennessee. Lassic rushed for 142 yards and both Alabama touchdowns. Tennessee backup quarterback Jerry Colquitt, who came into the game in relief after a hit forced Shuler to the sideline, said of the Alabama defense that "These guys are unbelievable [sic]. They beat you to the pocket."

=== Ole Miss ===
Against Ole Miss, the usually dominant Tide running attack was held to 83 yards after averaging 241 yards per game going in, but Jay Barker responded by completing 25 of 39 passes for 285 yards, all career highs, and the Tide rolled over the Rebels 31–10. Kevin Lee had 82 yards receiving and David Palmer had 67 yards as well as a touchdown reception.

=== At LSU ===
Chris Anderson ran for 149 yards on only 15 carries to help lift Bama to an easy 31–11 victory over LSU after starting tailback Derrick Lassic left the game with a shoulder injury in the first half. LSU had only 22 yards rushing. LSU's field goal on the first possession of the ball game was only the second time all season that Alabama had trailed.

=== At No. 16 Mississippi State ===
The Bulldogs gave Alabama its hardest test of the entire season. In the first half, it did not appear that would be the case. Alabama's first drive was an easy 67-yard march ending in a 23-yard shovel pass from Barker to Lassic for a touchdown. Mississippi State got the ball back, went nowhere, and attempted to punt, but Antonio Langham blocked the punt, recovered it at the MSU 5, and scored a touchdown to put Bama up 14–0. In the second quarter, the Tide kicked two field goals and the Bulldogs kicked one, making the halftime score 20–3.

Alabama, which had not allowed any opponent to score more than 11 points in a game, led by 17 at the half. Then Mississippi State caught a break, picking off a Barker pass and returning it to the Alabama 11. A touchdown and a two-point conversion followed to make it 20–11. Bama went three and out on its next possession, the Bulldogs got the ball at the Tide 47, and they capitalized with a quick TD drive. Suddenly the score was 20–18. Bama got one first down, then punted again. Mississippi State drove down to the Alabama 1, but an illegal participation penalty pushed the ball back to the 16 and the Bulldogs settled for a field goal. Eighteen unanswered third quarter points gave the Bulldogs a 21–20 lead. It was only the third time all year Alabama had trailed, and it was the only time in the 1992 season that they trailed in the fourth quarter.

An interception ended one Alabama drive and a sack ended the next one. Finally, a Mississippi State fumbled punt gave Alabama momentum. Barker completed a 24-yard pass to Prince Wimbley to advance the ball to the Bulldog 16, and a 26-yard field goal by Proctor made the score 23–21 with 8:10 left. Shortly thereafter George Teague intercepted a pass by MSU's Greg Plump, giving Alabama possession at the Bulldog 20. A five-play drive ended in a Chris Anderson TD run made the score 30–21 with 5:07 to go. Alabama stopped two Mississippi State drives in the waning minutes and the Tide escaped Starkville with a 30–21 victory.

=== Auburn ===
In the Iron Bowl finale against Auburn, the Tide offense struggled. Jay Barker threw two interceptions, including one on 2nd and 11 at the Auburn 16, and the game was scoreless at the half. Auburn got the ball to start the second half, but Antonio Langham intercepted a pass by Auburn's Stan White and returned it 61 yards for the first points of the game. Barker's struggles led Stallings to direct an ultra-conservative game in the second half, as the Tide attempted only one pass after halftime. That one pass, a 20-yard completion from Barker to Curtis Brown, set up a Michael Proctor field goal that stretched the lead to 10–0. A 16-yard Auburn punt gave Alabama the ball on the Tiger 40 as the third quarter ended, and the clinching touchdown in a 17–0 victory followed. Auburn had only eight first downs and 119 yards of total offense. It was Alabama's third shutout of the season, the most since the 1980 team also recorded three.

=== Vs. No. 12 Florida (SEC Championship) ===
As champions of the SEC Western Division, the Crimson Tide faced off in the first-ever SEC Championship Game against the Eastern Division champion Florida Gators. It was a tight contest. Florida QB Shane Matthews passed for 287 yards against a Tide defense that had been averaging 126 passing yards allowed per game. Florida scored a touchdown on the game's opening drive, driving 77 yards on an array of short passes completed by Matthews. It was the only first-quarter touchdown yielded by Alabama in all of 1992. Alabama responded immediately with a 72-yard drive that ended on a 5-yard TD run by Lassic. Jay Barker's 30-yard pass to Curtis Brown put Alabama out in front 14–7 in the second quarter. In the third quarter, a 39-yard completion from Barker to David Palmer was the key play in a drive that put the Tide ahead 21–7. Florida rallied, going on 68-yard and 51-yard marches to tie the game up with 8:09 left. Alabama's perfect season hung in the balance, until Antonio Langham picked off a Matthews pass with 3:16 to go for the game-winning touchdown, and another Matthews interception at the 2:54 mark sealed the victory. Palmer had 101 receiving yards and Derrick Lassic rushed for 117 yards. It was Alabama's 20th SEC Championship.

=== Vs. No. 1 Miami (Sugar Bowl) ===
Team	1	2	3	4	Total
#1 Miami	3	3	0	7	13
• #2 Alabama	3	10	14	7	34

- Date: January 1, 1993
- Location: Louisiana Superdome
  New Orleans, LA
- Game start: 7:30 pm CST
- Game attendance: 76,789
- Game weather: Indoors
- Referee: Rogers Redding
- TV announcers (ABC): Keith Jackson and Bob Griese

Alabama faced #1 Miami in the Sugar Bowl for the national championship. The result was an emphatic 34–13 Alabama victory that completed the perfect season and won a national championship. Jay Barker managed only 18 yards passing in the Sugar Bowl and threw two interceptions, but the Tide running game punished Miami for 267 yards, 67 more than Miami had allowed in any single game all season. This included 135 rushing yards by Derrick Lassic. 1992 Heisman Trophy winner Gino Toretta threw for 278 yards but, critically, also threw three interceptions, all of which led to Alabama touchdowns. Toretta was often flummoxed by Alabama's 11-man fronts.

On the opening possession, Alabama drove deep into Miami territory but could not get into the end zone, settling for a Michael Proctor field goal and a 3–0 lead. A 34-yard pass from Toretta to Kevin Williams set up a 49-yard field goal that tied the game. Jay Barker threw an interception in the first quarter that gave Miami the ball at the Alabama 39, but Lamar Thomas fumbled it right back after catching a pass from Toretta and the opportunity was wasted. Barker's second interception killed a drive at the Miami 23 before the first quarter ended. In the second, Alabama drove down to the Miami 1, the key plays being runs of 24 yards and 10 yards by Lassic and a six-yard pass from Barker to Palmer to move the chains on a third down. However, after Lassic's 10-yard run he and Alabama were penalized 15 yards for unsportsmanlike conduct (Lassic spun the ball on the ground as he got up), and the Tide was pushed back 15 yards. Alabama settled for another Proctor field goal and a 6–3 lead. Sam Shade intercepted a Toretta pass in the second quarter and returned it to the Miami 31, setting up a five-play drive that ended in a 2-yard TD run by Sherman Williams, putting Alabama ahead 13–3. A late Miami field goal made it 13–6 at the half.

Early in the third, Tommy Johnson intercepted a Toretta pass and returned it 23 yards to the Miami 20-yard line. A Lassic TD followed soon after. On the first play from scrimmage after Lassic's touchdown, George Teague picked off another Toretta pass and ran it back 31 yards for another touchdown and a 27–6 Alabama lead. Later in the third, Toretta hit Lamar Thomas on what briefly appeared to be an 88-yard touchdown pass. George Teague somehow caught Thomas from behind, so the play briefly appeared to be an 82-yard completion, but instead, Teague actually stripped Thomas of the football. Miami retained possession of the ball due to an offsides penalty on Alabama, but Teague's feat in catching Thomas and stripping him of the ball prevented a Hurricane touchdown and sent the ball back deep in Miami territory. Miami was forced to punt three plays later.

Kevin Williams ran a punt back 78 yards for Miami in the fourth quarter to cut the deficit to 27–13, but Derrick Lassic's four-yard run with 6:46 to go for his second touchdown of the game closed the scoring. Alabama beat Miami 34–13 and finished 13–0.

It was Alabama's twelfth national championship and the seventh by vote of either the AP Poll or Coaches' Poll. It was the first 13–0 season in Alabama history, and it was the eighth perfect season in Alabama history, following the perfect seasons of 1925, 1930, 1934, 1945, 1961, 1966, and 1979 (the 1897 season consisted of a single game which Alabama won).

Statistics

Statistics	Miami	Alabama
First downs	16	15
Total yards	326	285
Passing yards	278	18
Rushing yards	48	267
Penalties	6-37	7-46
Turnovers	4	2
Time of possession	23:56	36:04

== Roster ==
Position key

Back	B	Center	C	Cornerback	CB	Defensive back	DB
Defensive end	DE	Defensive lineman	DL	Defensive tackle	DT	End	E
Fullback	FB	Guard	G	Halfback	HB	Kicker	K
Kickoff returner	KR	Offensive tackle	OT	Offensive lineman	OL	Linebacker	LB
Long snapper	LS	Punter	P	Punt returner	PR	Quarterback	QB
Running back	RB	Safety	S	Tight end	TE	Wide receiver	WR

1992 Alabama Crimson Tide football team roster
Players
Coaches
Offense

Pos.	#	Name	Class
QB	1	Chad Key	Fr
WR	2	David Palmer	So
TE	5	Tony Johnson	Fr
WR	6	Willis Bevelle	Sr
QB	7	Jay Barker	So
QB	14	Brian Burgdorf	Fr
WR	15	Donnie Finkley	Sr
QB	16	Jason Jack	So
QB	18	Danny Davis	So
RB	20	Sherman Williams	So
RB	25	Derrick Lassic	Sr
FB	30	Craig Harris	Sr
WR	32	Prince Wimbley (C)	Sr
RB	33	Chris Anderson	Jr
FB	35	Martin Houston	Sr
WR	37	Kevin Lee	Jr
WR	38	Mike Campbell	Sr
WR	40	Lorenzo Cole	Jr
FB	41	Robert Strain	So
TE	42	Myron Pope	Jr
FB	45	Tarrant Lynch	So
TE	49	Chris Cochran	Sr
C	50	Don Dover	Sr
C	57	Derek Weaver	Jr
G	59	John Clay	Jr
OT	60	Joey Harville	So
C	61	Tobie Sheils	Jr
G	62	William Barger	Jr
OT	63	Matt Hammond	Jr
G	65	Napoleon Folks	So
C	66	Tim Barnett	Fr
OT	66	John Wall	So
OL	67	Scott Mullenix	Jr
OT	68	George Wilson (C)	Sr
G	69	Jon Stevenson	So
OT	70	Rory Segrest	Fr
OT	74	Kareem McNeil	Fr
OT	75	Johnny Howard	Sr
OT	77	Roosevelt Patterson	Jr
WR	80	Roman Colburn	So
WR	82	Rick Brown	So
TE	83	Steve Busky	Sr
WR	85	Curtis Brown	So
WR	88	Dabo Swinney	Sr
TE	95	Jason Abrams	Jr

Defense

Pos.	#	Name	Class
DB	1	Darren Greenwood	Sr
CB	9	Alvin Hope	Sr
CB	10	Tommy Johnson	So
LB	11	Lemanski Hall	Jr
FS	13	George Teague (C)	Sr
FS	17	Will Brown	So
FS	21	Chris Donnelly	Jr
SS	25	Alex Jordan	Jr
CB	28	Michael Ausmus	Fr
CB	29	Rock Woody	So
DB	31	Sam Shade	So
LB	36	Andre Royal	So
DB	40	Mickey Conn	So
CB	43	Antonio Langham	So
LB	44	Dameian Jeffries	So
SS	47	Jackson Lowery	So
LB	48	Jay Brannen	So
LB	51	DeLan Trimble	So
LB	52	Michael Rogers	So
LB	53	Jeff Torrence	Fr
LB	55	Antonio London	Sr
LB	56	Derrick Oden (C)	Sr
LB	58	Mario Morris	So
LB	59	Thad Turnipseed	So
LB	60	Jeff Foshee	So
DT	67	James Gregory	Jr
DT	71	Bart Pritchett	Sr
DE	73	Jeremy Nunley	Jr
DE	76	Elverett Brown	So
DT	77	John Phillips	Sr
DE	80	Eric Curry	Sr
DE	92	Jason Milner	So
DE	93	Shannon Brown	Fr
DE	94	John Copeland	Sr
DE	95	Chuck Aaron	So
DE	96	Bryan Thornton	Fr
DE	98	Vann Bodden	Fr
LB	99	Victor Lockett	Jr

Special teams

Pos.	#	Name	Class
P	2	Stan Moss	Sr
K	3	Michael Proctor	Fr
K	4	Matt Wethington	So
K	8	Steve Cole	Jr
P	12	Bryne Diehl	So
K	19	Matt Mundy	Fr
P	28	J.J. Adams	So
K	81	Hamp Greene	Fr
LS	87	Matthew Pine	Jr
K	92	James Tuley	Jr
LS	99	Jared Watson	So

Head coach

- Gene Stallings

Coordinators/assistant coaches

- Ellis Johnson (outside linebackers)

Legend

- (C) Team captain
- (S) Suspended
- (I) Ineligible
- Injured
- Redshirt

Roster

== Awards and honors ==
=== Coaches ===
Gene Stallings

- AFCA Coach of the Year
- Eddie Robinson Coach of the Year
- Paul “Bear” Bryant Award
- Walter Camp Coach of the Year

== All-Americans ==
Consensus Selection

- Eric Curry (AFCA, AP, UPI, WCFF, GNS, SH, TSN, WA)
- John Copeland (AFCA, AP, FWAA, WCFF, FN, GNS, SH, TSN)

== All-SEC ==
First Team

- Eric Curry, Defensive End (AP-1, Coaches-1)
- John Copeland, Defensive End (AP-1, Coaches-1)
- Antonio Langham, Cornerback (AP-1, Coaches-1)
- George Teague, Safety (AP-1, Coaches-1)

== Players drafted into the NFL ==
Round	Pick	Player	Position	NFL team
1	5	John Copeland	DE	Cincinnati Bengals
1	6	Eric Curry	DE	Tampa Bay Buccaneers
1	29	George Teague	DB	Green Bay Packers
3	62	Antonio London	LB	Detroit Lions
4	94	Derrick Lassic	RB	Dallas Cowboys
6	163	Derrick Oden	LB	Philadelphia Eagles
