= 1992 Vanderbilt Commodores football team =

American college football season

1992 Vanderbilt Commodores football
- Conference: Southeastern Conference
- Eastern Division
- Record: 4–7 (2–6 SEC)
- Head coach: Gerry DiNardo (2nd season)
- Offensive coordinator: Don Frease (2nd season)
- Defensive coordinator: Carl Reese (2nd season)
- Home stadium: Vanderbilt Stadium

1992 Southeastern Conference football standings
	Conf.					Overall
Team	W		L		T	W		L		T
Eastern Division
No. 10 Florida xy	6	–	2	–	0	9	–	4	–	0
No. 8 Georgia x	6	–	2	–	0	10	–	2	–	0
No. 12 Tennessee	5	–	3	–	0	9	–	3	–	0
South Carolina	3	–	5	–	0	5	–	6	–	0
Vanderbilt	2	–	6	–	0	4	–	7	–	0
Kentucky	2	–	6	–	0	4	–	7	–	0
Western Division
No. 1 Alabama x$	8	–	0	–	0	13	–	0	–	0
No. 16 Ole Miss	5	–	3	–	0	9	–	3	–	0
No. 23 Mississippi State	4	–	4	–	0	7	–	5	–	0
Arkansas	3	–	4	–	1	3	–	7	–	1
Auburn	2	–	5	–	1	5	–	5	–	1
LSU	1	–	7	–	0	2	–	9	–	0
Championship: Alabama 28, Florida 21
$ – Conference champion; x – Division champion/co-champions; y – Championship game participant; Rankings from AP Poll

The 1992 Vanderbilt Commodores football team represented Vanderbilt University in the 1992 NCAA Division I-A football season as a member of the Eastern Division of the Southeastern Conference (SEC). The Commodores were led by head coach Gerry DiNardo in his second season and finished with a record of four wins and seven losses (4–7 overall, 2–6 in the SEC).

== Schedule ==
Date	Opponent	Site	TV	Result	Attendance	Source
September 5	at No. 9 Alabama	Bryant–Denny Stadium; Tuscaloosa, AL	JPS	L 8–25	70,123	
September 12	Duke*	Vanderbilt Stadium; Nashville, TN		W 42–37	40,031	
September 19	No. 25 Ole Miss	Vanderbilt Stadium; Nashville, TN (rivalry)		W 31–9	41,000	
October 3	at Auburn	Jordan-Hare Stadium; Auburn, AL		L 7–31	58,229	
October 10	Wake Forest*	Vanderbilt Stadium; Nashville, TN		L 6–40	33,860	
October 17	at No. 10 Georgia	Sanford Stadium; Athens, GA (rivalry)		L 20–30	83,067	
October 24	South Carolina	Vanderbilt Stadium; Nashville, TN		L 17–21	40,900	
November 7	at Kentucky	Commonwealth Stadium; Lexington, KY (rivalry)		W 20–7	45,350	
November 14	at Navy*	Navy–Marine Corps Memorial Stadium; Annapolis, MD		W 27–7	21,954	
November 21	No. 9 Florida	Vanderbilt Stadium; Nashville, TN		L 21–41	32,279	
November 28	No. 18 Tennessee	Vanderbilt Stadium; Nashville, TN (rivalry)		L 25–29	41,000	
*Non-conference game; Rankings from AP Poll released prior to the game
