= 1992 LSU Tigers football team =

American college football season

1992 LSU Tigers football
- Conference: Southeastern Conference
- Western Division
- Record: 2–9 (1–7 SEC)
- Head coach: Curley Hallman (2nd season)
- Offensive coordinator: George Haffner (2nd season)
- Offensive scheme: Multiple
- Defensive coordinator: Michael Bugar (2nd season)
- Base defense: 3–4
- Home stadium: Tiger Stadium

1992 Southeastern Conference football standings
	Conf.					Overall
Team	W		L		T	W		L		T
Eastern Division
No. 10 Florida xy	6	–	2	–	0	9	–	4	–	0
No. 8 Georgia x	6	–	2	–	0	10	–	2	–	0
No. 12 Tennessee	5	–	3	–	0	9	–	3	–	0
South Carolina	3	–	5	–	0	5	–	6	–	0
Vanderbilt	2	–	6	–	0	4	–	7	–	0
Kentucky	2	–	6	–	0	4	–	7	–	0
Western Division
No. 1 Alabama x$	8	–	0	–	0	13	–	0	–	0
No. 16 Ole Miss	5	–	3	–	0	9	–	3	–	0
No. 23 Mississippi State	4	–	4	–	0	7	–	5	–	0
Arkansas	3	–	4	–	1	3	–	7	–	1
Auburn	2	–	5	–	1	5	–	5	–	1
LSU	1	–	7	–	0	2	–	9	–	0
Championship: Alabama 28, Florida 21
$ – Conference champion; x – Division champion/co-champions; y – Championship game participant; Rankings from AP Poll

The 1992 LSU Tigers football team represented Louisiana State University (LSU) during the 1992 NCAA Division I-A football season as a member of the Southeastern Conference in the Western Division. The team was led by Curley Hallman in his second season and finished with an overall record of two wins and nine losses (2–9 overall, 1–7 in the SEC).

== Schedule ==
Date	Time	Opponent	Site	TV	Result	Attendance	Source
September 5	2:30 p.m.	No. 7 Texas A&M*	Tiger Stadium; Baton Rouge, LA (rivalry)	ABC	L 22–31	69,313	
September 12	7:00 p.m.	No. 18 Mississippi State	Tiger Stadium; Baton Rouge, LA (rivalry)	PPV	W 24–3	68,888	
September 19	11:30 a.m.	at Auburn	Jordan-Hare Stadium; Auburn, AL (rivalry)	JPS	L 28–30	76,637	
September 26	7:00 p.m.	Colorado State*	Tiger Stadium; Baton Rouge, LA	PPV	L 14–17	69,654	
October 3	6:30 p.m.	No. 7 Tennessee	Tiger Stadium; Baton Rouge, LA	ESPN	L 0–20	68,318	
October 10	12:30 p.m.	at No. 23 Florida	Ben Hill Griffin Stadium; Gainesville, FL (rivalry)	PPV	L 21–28	83,401	
October 17	7:00 p.m.	Kentucky	Tiger Stadium; Baton Rouge, LA	PPV	L 25–27	57,641	
October 31	6:00 p.m.	at Ole Miss	Mississippi Veterans Memorial Stadium; Jackson, MS (rivalry)	PPV	L 0–32	47,500	
November 7	2:30 p.m.	No. 3 Alabama	Tiger Stadium; Baton Rouge, LA (rivalry)	ABC	L 11–31	76,813	
November 21	7:00 p.m.	Tulane*^{†}	Tiger Stadium; Baton Rouge, LA (Battle for the Rag)		W 24–12	59,919	
November 27	1:00 p.m.	at Arkansas	Razorback Stadium; Fayetteville, AR (rivalry)	ESPN	L 6–30	32,721	
*Non-conference game; ^{†}Homecoming; Rankings from AP Poll released prior to the game; All times are in Central time

== Roster ==
1992 LSU Tigers football team roster
Players
Coaches
Offense

Pos.	#	Name	Class
QB	2	Jesse Daigle	Jr
QB	4	Jamie Howard	Fr
SE	9	Wesley Jacob	Sr
QB	10	Brad Strohm	Jr
QB	15	Ryan Huffman	Fr
QB	16	Chad Loup	Jr
SE	17	Scott Ray	Jr
TB	22	Artie Moore	Fr
TB	25	Jay Johnson	Fr
RB	32	Germaine Williams	Jr
RB	33	Odell Beckham Sr.	Sr
RB	36	Robert Toomer	Fr
C	52	Kevin Mawae	Jr
G	53	Jeff Jenkins	Fr
OT	65	Ross Setters	Jr
OT	71	Tom Turner	Fr
G	73	Ronnie Simnicht	Jr
OT	79	Marcus Price	So
TE	86	Harold Bishop	Jr
WR	87	Brett Bech	So

Defense

Pos.	#	Name	Class
OLB	7	James Gillyard	Fr
SS	8	Carlton Buckels	Sr
DB	11	Gary Pegues	So
FS	14	Anthony Marshall	Jr
CB	25	Derriel McCorvey	Sr
DB	27	Vincent Fuller	Sr
ILB	30	Bobby Williams	So
CB	42	Rodney Young	So
ILB	46	Robert Deshotel	So
ILB	85	David Walkup	Sr
OLB	88	Gabe Northern	Fr
DT	90	John Morgan	Sr
DT	92	Ike Pullett	Jr
DT	93	Robert Miller	Fr
NG	94	Doug Admire	Fr
DT	95	Robert Thibodeaux	Fr
NG	96	Bo Davis	Sr
NG	97	William Crowell	So
DT	98	Nate Miller	So
LB	99	Eric Valentino	Fr

Special teams

Pos.	#	Name	Class
K	6	Pedro Suarez	Sr
LS	51	Chris Watermeier	Jr
K	84	Matt Huerkamp	Fr
P	87	Brian Griffith	Jr

Head coach

- Curley Hallman

Coordinators/assistant coaches

- George Haffner – Offensive coordinator/quarterbacks
- Steve Buckley – Running backs
- Larry Edmonson – Wide receiver
- Darrell Dickey – Tight ends
- Buddy King – Offensive line
- Michael Bugar – Defensive coordinator/defensive line
- Thielen Smith – Inside linebackers
- Phil Bennett – Outside linebackers/defensive ends
- Steve Davis – Special teams coordinator/defensive backs

Legend

- (C) Team captain
- (S) Suspended
- (I) Ineligible
- Injured
- Redshirt

Roster
