= 1992 Auburn Tigers football team =

American college football season

1992 Auburn Tigers football
- Conference: Southeastern Conference
- Western Division
- Record: 5–5–1 (2–5–1 SEC)
- Head coach: Pat Dye (12th season)
- Offensive coordinator: Tommy Bowden (2nd season)
- Defensive coordinator: Wayne Hall (7th season)
- Home stadium: Jordan–Hare Stadium

1992 Southeastern Conference football standings
	Conf.					Overall
Team	W		L		T	W		L		T
Eastern Division
No. 10 Florida xy	6	–	2	–	0	9	–	4	–	0
No. 8 Georgia x	6	–	2	–	0	10	–	2	–	0
No. 12 Tennessee	5	–	3	–	0	9	–	3	–	0
South Carolina	3	–	5	–	0	5	–	6	–	0
Vanderbilt	2	–	6	–	0	4	–	7	–	0
Kentucky	2	–	6	–	0	4	–	7	–	0
Western Division
No. 1 Alabama x$	8	–	0	–	0	13	–	0	–	0
No. 16 Ole Miss	5	–	3	–	0	9	–	3	–	0
No. 23 Mississippi State	4	–	4	–	0	7	–	5	–	0
Arkansas	3	–	4	–	1	3	–	7	–	1
Auburn	2	–	5	–	1	5	–	5	–	1
LSU	1	–	7	–	0	2	–	9	–	0
Championship: Alabama 28, Florida 21
$ – Conference champion; x – Division champion/co-champions; y – Championship game participant; Rankings from AP Poll

The 1992 Auburn Tigers football team represented Auburn University as a member of the Western Division of the Southeastern Conference (SEC) during the 1992 NCAA Division I-A football season. Led by 12th-year head coach Pat Dye, the Tigers compiled an overall record of 5–5–1, with a mark of 2–5–1 in conference play, and finished in fifth place in the SEC Western Division.

== Schedule ==
Date	Time	Opponent	Site	TV	Result	Attendance	Source
September 5	6:00 p.m.	at Ole Miss	Vaught–Hemingway Stadium; Oxford, MS (rivalry)		L 21–45	40,000	
September 12	1:00 p.m.	Samford*	Jordan-Hare Stadium; Auburn, AL		W 55–0	65,913	
September 19	11:30 a.m.	LSU	Jordan-Hare Stadium; Auburn, AL (rivalry)	JPS	W 30–28	76,637	
September 26	1:00 p.m.	Southern Miss*	Jordan-Hare Stadium; Auburn, AL		W 16–8	72,296	
October 3	1:00 p.m.	Vanderbilt	Jordan-Hare Stadium; Auburn, AL		W 31–7	58,229	
October 10	6:00 p.m.	at No. 18 Mississippi State	Scott Field; Starkville, MS		L 7–14	41,224	
October 17	11:00 a.m.	at No. 23 Florida	Ben Hill Griffin Stadium; Gainesville, FL (rivalry)	ABC	L 9–24	84,098	
October 24	1:00 p.m.	Southwestern Louisiana*^{†}	Jordan-Hare Stadium; Auburn, AL		W 25–24	74,327	
October 31	1:00 p.m.	Arkansas	Jordan-Hare Stadium; Auburn, AL		T 24–24	77,933	
November 14	2:30 p.m.	No. 12 Georgia	Jordan-Hare Stadium; Auburn, AL (rivalry)	ABC	L 10–14	85,214	
November 26	12:00 p.m.	at No. 2 Alabama	Legion Field; Birmingham, AL (Iron Bowl)	ABC	L 0–17	83,091	
*Non-conference game; ^{†}Homecoming; Rankings from AP Poll released prior to the game; All times are in Central time

== Roster ==
1992 Auburn Tigers football team roster
Players
Coaches
Offense

Pos.	#	Name	Class
WR	1	Orlando Parker	So
QB	11	Stan White	Jr
WR	18	Thomas Bailey	So
FB	40	Tony Richardson	Jr
OT	68	Chris Gray	Sr
OT	74	Wayne Gandy	Jr
WR	81	Frank Sanders	So
TE	85	Fred Baxter	Sr

Defense

Pos.	#	Name	Class
LB	53	Anthony Harris	Fr
DE	48	Willie Whitehead	So
LB	51	James Wills	Sr

Special teams

Pos.	#	Name	Class

Head coach

- Pat Dye

Coordinators/assistant coaches

Legend

- (C) Team captain
- (S) Suspended
- (I) Ineligible
- Injured
- Redshirt

Roster
