= 1992 Florida Gators football team =

American college football season

1992 Florida Gators football

SEC Eastern Division co-champion Gator Bowl champion

SEC Championship Game, L 21–28 vs. Alabama

Gator Bowl, W 27–10 vs. NC State
- Conference: Southeastern Conference
- Eastern Division

Ranking
- Coaches: No. 11
- AP: No. 10
- Record: 9–4 (6–2 SEC)
- Head coach: Steve Spurrier (3rd season)
- Offensive scheme: Fun and gun
- Defensive coordinator: Ron Zook (2nd season)
- Base defense: 4–4–3
- Captains: Shane Matthews; Carlton Miles
- Home stadium: Ben Hill Griffin Stadium

1992 Southeastern Conference football standings
	Conf.					Overall
Team	W		L		T	W		L		T
Eastern Division
No. 10 Florida xy	6	–	2	–	0	9	–	4	–	0
No. 8 Georgia x	6	–	2	–	0	10	–	2	–	0
No. 12 Tennessee	5	–	3	–	0	9	–	3	–	0
South Carolina	3	–	5	–	0	5	–	6	–	0
Vanderbilt	2	–	6	–	0	4	–	7	–	0
Kentucky	2	–	6	–	0	4	–	7	–	0
Western Division
No. 1 Alabama x$	8	–	0	–	0	13	–	0	–	0
No. 16 Ole Miss	5	–	3	–	0	9	–	3	–	0
No. 23 Mississippi State	4	–	4	–	0	7	–	5	–	0
Arkansas	3	–	4	–	1	3	–	7	–	1
Auburn	2	–	5	–	1	5	–	5	–	1
LSU	1	–	7	–	0	2	–	9	–	0
Championship: Alabama 28, Florida 21
$ – Conference champion; x – Division champion/co-champions; y – Championship game participant; Rankings from AP Poll

The 1992 Florida Gators football team represented the University of Florida during the 1992 NCAA Division I-A football season. The season was Steve Spurrier's third as the Florida Gators football team's head coach, and the wins were harder to come by as the star-studded senior classes from 1990 and 1991 had graduated. The Gators racked up six tough Southeastern Conference (SEC) wins over the Kentucky Wildcats (35–19), LSU Tigers (28–21), Auburn Tigers (24–9), seventh-ranked Georgia Bulldogs (26–24), South Carolina Gamecocks (14–9), and Vanderbilt Commodores (41–21). They also suffered two crushing SEC losses to the fourteenth-ranked Tennessee Volunteers (31–14) in Knoxville, Tennessee, and the twenty-fourth-ranked Mississippi State Bulldogs (30–6) on a Thursday night in Starkville, Mississippi.

The Gators' non-conference schedule included a homecoming victory over the Louisville Cardinals (31–17), and another surprisingly difficult win over Southern Miss Golden Eagles (24–20). They closed their regular season with a road loss to the third-ranked Florida State Seminoles (45–24) in Tallahassee.

The Gators finished their SEC schedule with a 6–2 conference record, placing first among the six teams of the new SEC Eastern Division and earning a berth in the first-ever SEC Championship Game in Birmingham, Alabama. Spurrier's scrappy young Gators, however, fell short against the SEC Western Division champion, the second-ranked Alabama Crimson Tide (28–21). The Crimson Tide later defeated the Miami Hurricanes in the Sugar Bowl to win the 1992 national championship.

Spurrier's 1992 Florida Gators posted a 9–4 overall record, concluding their season with a victory over the twelfth-ranked NC State Wolfpack (27–10) in the Gator Bowl, and ranking tenth in the final AP Poll.

== Schedule ==
Date	Time	Opponent	Rank	Site	TV	Result	Attendance	Source
September 12		Kentucky	No. 4	Ben Hill Griffin Stadium; Gainesville, FL (rivalry)	JPS	W 35–19	84,553	
September 19	3:30 p.m.	at No. 14 Tennessee	No. 4	Neyland Stadium; Knoxville, TN (rivalry)	ABC	L 14–31	97,137	
October 1	7:45 p.m.	at No. 24 Mississippi State	No. 13	Scott Field; Starkville, MS	ESPN	L 6–30	38,886	
October 10	1:30 p.m.	LSU	No. 23	Ben Hill Griffin Stadium; Gainesville, FL (rivalry)	JPS	W 28–21	83,401	
October 17	12:00 p.m.	Auburn	No. 23	Ben Hill Griffin Stadium; Gainesville, FL (rivalry)	ABC	W 24–9	84,098	
October 24		Louisville*^{†}	No. 20	Ben Hill Griffin Stadium; Gainesville, FL		W 31–17	84,476	
October 31	3:30 p.m.	vs. No. 7 Georgia	No. 20	Gator Bowl Stadium; Jacksonville, FL (rivalry)	ABC	W 26–24	82,429	
November 7		Southern Miss*	No. 14	Ben Hill Griffin Stadium; Gainesville, FL		W 24–20	82,882	
November 14	12:30 p.m.	South Carolina	No. 11	Ben Hill Griffin Stadium; Gainesville, FL	JPS	W 14–9	84,777	
November 21		at Vanderbilt	No. 9	Vanderbilt Stadium; Nashville, TN	JPS	W 41–21	32,279	
November 28	12:00 p.m.	at No. 3 Florida State*	No. 6	Doak Campbell Stadium; Tallahassee, FL (rivalry)	ABC	L 24–45	68,311	
December 5	3:30 p.m.	vs. No. 2 Alabama	No. 12	Legion Field; Birmingham, AL (SEC Championship Game, rivalry)	ABC	L 21–28	83,091	
December 31		vs. No. 12 NC State*	No. 14	Gator Bowl Stadium; Jacksonville, FL (Gator Bowl)	TBS	W 27–10	71,233	
*Non-conference game; ^{†}Homecoming; Rankings from AP Poll released prior to the game; All times are in Eastern time

== Roster ==
1992 Florida Gators football team roster
Players
Coaches
Offense

Pos.	#	Name	Class
QB	12	Terry Dean	So
WR	1	Jack Jackson	RFr
WR	22	Willie Jackson	Jr
OL	69	Brian Fisher	Jr
QB	9	Shane Matthews	Sr
RB	33	Errict Rhett	Jr
OL	73	Jim Watson	Jr
OL	50	Gantt Crouch	Jr
OL	76	Ryan Taylor	So

Defense

Pos.	#	Name	Class
LB	57	Myrick Anderson	Sr
DE	57	Kevin Carter	So
DT	94	William Gaines	Jr
DB	10	Monty Grow	Jr
DE	99	Mike Karr	Sr
DT	61	Ellis Johnson	So
CB	4	Del Speer	Sr
DB	2	Will White	Sr
FS	20	Sammy McCorkle	Fr

Special teams

Pos.	#	Name	Class

Head coach

- Steve Spurrier

Coordinators/assistant coaches

- Ron Zook (DC)
- Charlie Strong (DE)

Legend

- (C) Team captain
- (S) Suspended
- (I) Ineligible
- Injured
- Redshirt
