= Gene Stallings =

American football player and coach (born 1935)

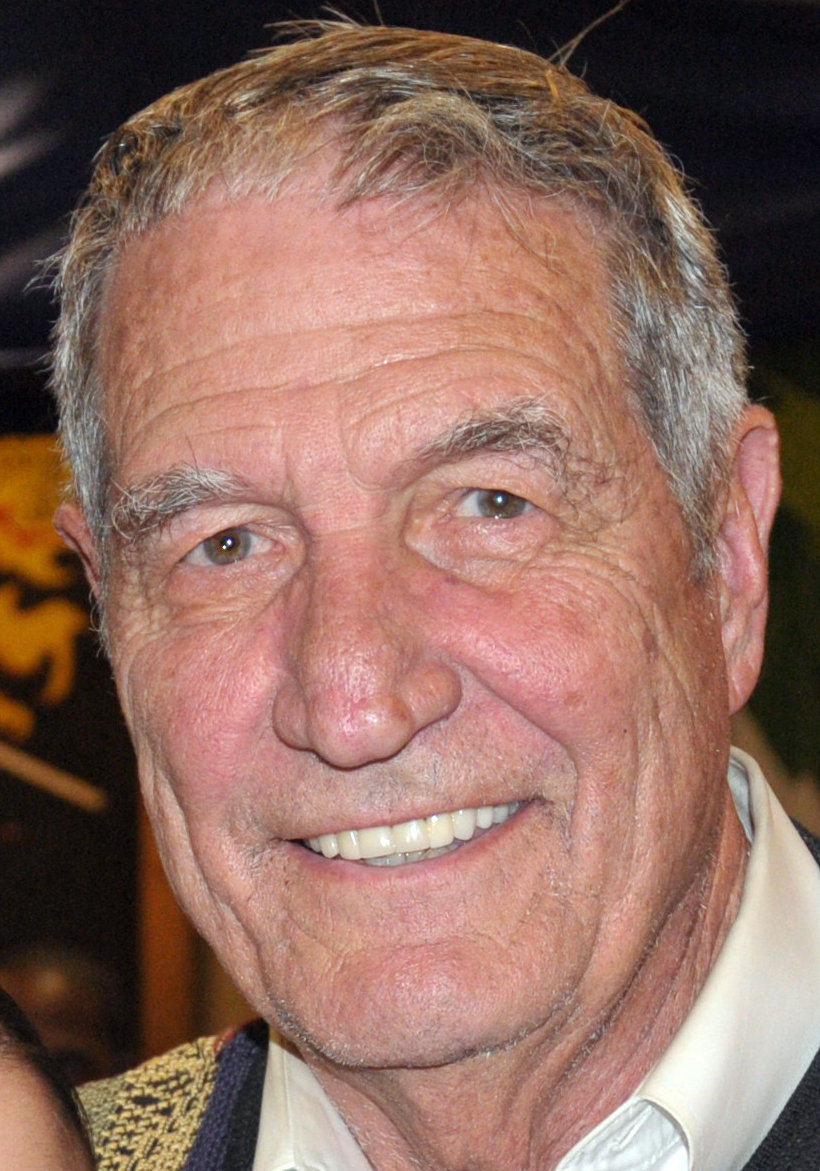
- Stallings in 2009

Personal information
- Born: March 2, 1935 (age 91); Paris, Texas, U.S.

Career information
- High school: Paris
- College: Texas A&M (1953–1956)

Career history
- Texas A&M (1957) Freshman coach; Alabama (1958–1960) Ends coach; Alabama (1961) Secondary coach; Alabama (1962–1963) Defensive coordinator; Alabama (1964) Assistant head coach & defensive coordinator; Texas A&M (1965–1971) Head coach; Dallas Cowboys (1972–1985) Defensive backs coach; St. Louis/Phoenix Cardinals (1986–1989) Head coach; Alabama (1990–1996) Head coach

Awards and highlights
- Playing: First-team All-SWC (1955); Coaching: National champion (1992); SWC champion (1967); SEC champion (1992); SEC West Division champion (1992–1994, 1996); AFCA Coach of the Year (1992); Eddie Robinson Coach of the Year (1992); Paul "Bear" Bryant Award (1992); Walter Camp Coach of the Year (1992); George Munger Award (1992); 2× SEC Coach of the Year (1992, 1994); SWC Coach of the Year (1967)

Head coaching record
- Career: NCAA: 97–61–2* (college); NFL: 23–34–1
- Coaching profile at Pro Football Reference
- College Football Hall of Fame

Eugene Clifton Stallings Jr. (born March 2, 1935) is an American former football player and coach. He played college football at Texas A&M University (1954–1956), where he was one of the "Junction Boys", and later served as the head coach at his alma mater from 1965 to 1971. Stallings was also the head coach of the St. Louis/Phoenix Cardinals of the National Football League (NFL) (1986–1989) and at the University of Alabama (1990–1996). Stallings' 1992 Alabama team completed a 13–0 season with a win in the Sugar Bowl over Miami and was named the consensus national champion. Stallings was also a member of the Board of Regents of the Texas A&M University System. He was inducted into the College Football Hall of Fame as a coach on July 16, 2011.

== Early life ==
Stallings was born in Paris, Texas. He attended Paris High School, where he played end as a sophomore alongside future National Football League (NFL) star, Raymond Berry. During his junior and senior year, Stallings was the captain of the football, basketball, and golf teams. He was recruited to Texas A&M University to play college football by then-head coach Raymond George.

== College career ==
At Texas A&M, Stallings was a member of the famed Junction Boys under head coach Bear Bryant. In 1956, he helped the team finish 9–0–1 and capture its first Southwest Conference championship since 1941. Stallings received his Bachelor of Physical Education degree from Texas A&M in 1957.

== Coaching career ==
=== Assistant coach ===
In 1957, Stallings was the freshman coach for his alma mater, Texas A&M.

In 1958, Stallings rejoined Bear Bryant at the University of Alabama, this time as the ends coach. He was on hand for two of Alabama's national championship seasons: 1961 and 1964. He was promoted to defensive secondary coach in 1961. The following year he was named defensive coordinator, and in 1964 he added the title of assistant head coach.

=== Texas A&M ===
Shortly after helping Alabama win the 1964 national title, Stallings was named the head coach of his alma mater, Texas A&M, at the age of 29. He coached the Aggies for seven seasons compiling a record of 27–45–1. During his tenure, the Aggies won the Southwest Conference in 1967, Stallings' only winning season at A&M. At the end of that season Stallings led Texas A&M to a victory over Alabama and mentor Bear Bryant in the Cotton Bowl, a victory where Bryant gave Stallings a hug and carried him around the field.

With the university only recently going co-ed, its military focus and the ongoing war in Vietnam, A&M struggled to recruit against its Southwest Conference rivals. He was fired at A&M following the 1971 season.

=== Dallas Cowboys ===
In 1972, Stallings joined the staff of the Dallas Cowboys as Tom Landry's secondary coach. He remained with the Cowboys for 14 seasons and helped them win Super Bowl XII.

=== St. Louis / Phoenix Cardinals ===
In 1986, Stallings was named the head coach of the St. Louis Cardinals. In four seasons, Stallings compiled a 23–34–1 record with the Cardinals and was the head coach during the franchise's move to Arizona. In 1987, the franchise's final season in St. Louis, the Cardinals rallied from a 28–3 deficit at the start of the fourth quarter to defeat the Tampa Bay Buccaneers, 31–28, the largest fourth quarter comeback in NFL history. The Cardinals used the comeback to springboard themselves into position to clinch a playoff berth on the final Sunday of the season, but fell short with a 21–16 loss at Dallas.

The Cardinals' relocation from St. Louis to Arizona was approved on March 15, 1988.

In 1988, the Cardinals pulled off another miracle comeback, rallying from a 23–0 deficit against the eventual Super Bowl champion San Francisco 49ers for a 24–23 victory. Phoenix was 7–4 and in first place in the NFC East but collapsed, losing their final five games, including two to the division champion Philadelphia Eagles.

The 1989 season started with road victories at Detroit and Seattle, but injuries derailed any playoff hopes. With five games remaining in the 1989 season, Stallings announced that he would resign at the end of the season. Believing Stallings would be a distraction, general manager Larry Wilson ordered Stallings to leave immediately and named assistant Hank Kuhlmann as interim coach for the rest of the season. The Cardinals lost all five games under Kuhlmann and finished 5–11, the first of four consecutive seasons in which the team would lose at least 11 games.

=== Head coach at Alabama ===
Stallings returned to Alabama as head coach in 1990. His first team finished with a 7–5 record, including a 34–7 loss to Louisville in the 1991 Fiesta Bowl. Following Harold Drew, Stallings became only the second Alabama head coach since the renewal of the Iron Bowl in 1948 to defeat Auburn in his first attempt; Dennis Franchione became the third in 2001, with Kalen Deboer the fourth in 2024. Stallings' 1991 squad finished the season with an 11–1 record, including a 30–25 victory over Colorado in the 1991 Blockbuster Bowl.

In 1992, Stallings' experienced defensive unit led the team to an undefeated regular season and a berth in the first SEC Championship Game where Alabama defeated Florida, 28–21, giving Alabama its 20th Southeastern Conference (SEC) title, and its first outright conference title since 1979. Following a 34–13 victory over heavily favored Miami in the 1993 Sugar Bowl to cap a perfect 13–0 season and the first Bowl Coalition national championship—their first national title since 1979.

Stallings' 1993 Alabama squad won a second straight SEC West Division title, compiling a 9–3–1 record. However, the Tide lost to Florida in the SEC Championship Game. In 1994, Stallings' team finished the regular season with a record of 11–0, an 8–0 record in the SEC, and captured its third straight SEC West Division title. However, they lost the SEC title game for the second year in a row to Florida. Alabama finished the 1994 season with a 12–1 record, including a 24–17 victory over Ohio State in the Citrus Bowl.

After an investigation that ran from late 1993 to August 1995, the NCAA found Alabama guilty of four major rules violations during the 1993 season. Stallings was implicated, along with athletic director Hootie Ingram, in falsifying the eligibility of Alabama cornerback Antonio Langham during that season. Langham had signed with a sports agent and applied to enter the NFL draft following the 1993 Sugar Bowl, but was not subsequently declared ineligible per NCAA rules. Alabama officials only declared him ineligible the week before the 1993 SEC title game. As a result, Alabama's football program was placed on three years probation, and docked a total of 30 scholarships from 1995 to 1998. Alabama was also forced to forfeit eight wins and one tie from its 9–3–1 1993 season in which Langham participated, resulting in an official record of 1–12. The Crimson Tide were also barred from postseason competition, including the SEC Championship Game and bowl games, during the 1995 season.

Alabama went 8–3 in 1995, the only season between 1992 and 1996 that Stallings didn't win the SEC West (Auburn finished first in the division in 1993 but was serving a post-season ban). Arkansas won the West title in 1995, with a last second touchdown against the Tide to claim their first ever victory over Alabama. However, the Tide would have been ineligible for the SEC Championship Game or a bowl game regardless as a result of the NCAA sanctions.

In 1996, Stallings' team won ten games and earned a berth in the SEC Championship Game, where they lost again to Florida, which eventually won the national title that season. Stallings announced on November 23, 1996, that he would resign at the end of the season. He completed his tenure at Alabama with a 17–14 win over Michigan in the 1997 Outback Bowl on January 1, 1997. Stallings compiled an official record at Alabama of 62–25 . The lost scholarships as a result of the 1995 infractions case, however, would hobble the Tide for several years to come; they would win eight or more games only three times between Stallings' departure and Nick Saban's arrival in 2007, and would also suffer four of its only five losing seasons since Bryant's arrival.

== Outside football ==
=== Family ===
Stallings married Ruth Ann Jack after his graduation from Texas A&M. The couple went on to have five children: Anna Lee, Laurie, John Mark, Jackie, and Martha Kate. As a result of John Mark being born with Down syndrome, and a congenital heart defect, Stallings became heavily involved in projects promoting better education and quality of life for the developmentally disabled; the two appeared in a 1987 NFL public service announcement for the United Way. Following Stallings's retirement, he moved back to the Paris area with his wife and son to establish Hike-A-Way Ranch, a working cattle ranch in Powderly, Texas.

=== Board leadership ===
Stallings serves on many boards, including formerly on President George W. Bush's Commission on Intellectual Disability. In addition, Stallings served on the board of Abilene Christian University. Other boards include Tandy Corporation, People's National Bank of Paris, Paris Regional Medical Center, Disability Resources, the Texas Rangers Law Enforcement Association, the Great Southern Wood Corporation, and the Boys and Girls Club of Paris, Texas.

Stallings was appointed to the Texas A&M Board of Regents by Texas Governor Rick Perry in 2005. He served on the Committee on Audit and the Committee on Academic and Student Affairs. Stallings was chair of the Policy Review Committee and a member of the Special Committee on Educational Access. His term expired on February 1, 2011.

=== Writing ===
Stallings co-wrote the book Another Season: A Coach's Story of Raising an Exceptional Son (ISBN 0-316-81196-3) with AP journalist Sally Cook, which described his and his family's relationship with only son John Mark Stallings. John Mark, also known as "Johnny," was a dedicated follower of his father's career, a longtime Crimson Tide fan, and a tour guide in the Crimson Tide facilities. John Mark died on August 2, 2008, due to a congenital heart condition; in 2009, an updated paperback edition of the book was published with added material on the final years of John Mark's life. Two facilities at the University of Alabama were named for the younger Stallings: the Stallings Center that serves as home to the RISE Center for young children with disabilities, in 1994, and the equipment room in the University of Alabama football building in 2005. Most recently, Faulkner University in Montgomery, Alabama, named its new football and soccer field after John Mark Stallings on October 8, 2010, an honor that had been planned prior to his death two years before:

The sports world lost a legend on Aug. 2 in Paris, Texas.

He's the son of a Junction Boy, which makes him a grandson of Bear Bryant. At the same time, he's both a son of Aggieland and a son of Alabama.

Gene Stallings' son, John Mark "Johnny" Stallings, touched a lot of lives in his 46 years, melting even the hardest hearts of the toughest athletes to play for Gene in college at Texas A&M, Alabama or in the NFL with the Cowboys and Cardinals.

And Johnny never strapped on the pads for a single play. ... Johnny made his difference by showing everyone he met, and even those he didn't, that someone with Down syndrome or a disability could make a difference in this world. ... With help from four sisters, the Stallings family raised a man who has become a legend in Alabama for his smile and his positive outlook on life. ...

The outpouring of love given to the Stallings family over the past week is a direct reflection of the love one man had for life and everyone he met. We should all be so lucky to live like that.

== Awards and honors ==
Stallings received a number of national coaching awards in 1992 and was the SEC Coach of the Year twice, in 1992 and 1994. In 2000, Stallings was awarded Distinguished Alumnus of Texas A&M University. He was awarded the Legends Award from the All Sports Association in Dallas in 2001. Stallings has also received many humanitarian awards, including the Arthritis Humanitarian Award of Alabama, National Boys Club Alumni of the Year, Dallas Father of the Year, Humanitarian Award of the Lion's Club of Alabama, and Paris Boys Club Wall of Honor.

Stallings has been inducted into the College Football Hall of Fame, Alabama Sports Hall of Fame, Texas Sports Hall of Fame, Texas A&M Hall of Fame, Gator Bowl Hall of Fame and Cotton Bowl Hall of Fame. He also received an honorary doctoral degree from Harding University.

Gene Stallings' involvement in the disability community, has also been strong. His son, John Mark was born with Trisomy 21, Down syndrome, and Gene Stallings has a school for children with disabilities named after him on the University of Alabama Campus, for which he hosts a charity golf tournament every year. The playground at the school is called the John Mark Stallings Playground.

== Head coaching record ==
=== College ===
Year	Team	Overall	Conference	Standing	Bowl/playoffs	Coaches^{#}	AP^{°}
Texas A&M Aggies (Southwest Conference) (1965–1971)
1965	Texas A&M	3–7	1–6	T–7th			
1966	Texas A&M	4–5–1	4–3	4th			
1967	Texas A&M	7–4	6–1	1st	W Cotton		
1968	Texas A&M	3–7	2–5	T–6th			
1969	Texas A&M	3–7	2–5	T–6th			
1970	Texas A&M	2–9	0–7	8th			
1971	Texas A&M	5–6	4–3	4th			
Texas A&M:		27–45–1	19–30				
Alabama Crimson Tide (Southeastern Conference) (1990–1996)
1990	Alabama	7–5	5–2	T–3rd	L Fiesta		
1991	Alabama	11–1	6–1	2nd	W Blockbuster	5	5
1992	Alabama	13–0	8–0	1st (West)	W Sugar^{†}	1	1
1993	Alabama	9–3–1*	5–2–1*	2nd (West)*	W Gator^{†}	13	14
1994	Alabama	12–1	8–0	1st (West)	W Florida Citrus	4	5
1995	Alabama^{‡}	8–3	5–3	T–2nd (West)			21
1996	Alabama	10–3	6–2	T–1st (West)	W Outback	11	11
Alabama:		70–16–1	43–13–1				
Total:		97–61–2					
National championship Conference title Conference division title or championship game berth
^{†}Indicates Bowl Coalition bowl.; ^{#}Rankings from final Coaches Poll.; ^{°}Rankings from final AP Poll.

*Alabama forfeited eight wins and one tie, after Antonio Langham was ruled ineligible. Unofficial record for 1993 was 9–3–1.
‡ The 1995 Alabama team was on probation and ineligible to win the conference title, to be selected to a bowl, or to be selected in the coaches poll.
& Unofficial Record at Alabama is 70-16-1 (43-11-1 SEC) and unofficial overall record is 97–61–2.

=== NFL ===
Team	Year	Regular season					Postseason			
Team	Year	Won	Lost	Ties	Win %	Finish	Won	Lost	Win %	Result
SLC	1986	4	11	1	.281	5th in NFC East	–	–	–	–
SLC	1987	7	8	0	.467	3rd in NFC East	–	–	–	–
PHO	1988	7	9	0	.438	4th in NFC East	–	–	–	–
PHO	1989	5	6	0	.438	4th in NFC East	–	–	–	–
SLC/PHO total		23	34	1	.405		–	–	–	
Total		23	34	1	.405					
