= 1992 Ole Miss Rebels football team =

American college football season

1992 Ole Miss Rebels football

Liberty Bowl champion

Liberty Bowl, W 13–0 vs. Air Force
- Conference: Southeastern Conference
- Western Division

Ranking
- Coaches: No. 16
- AP: No. 16
- Record: 9–3 (5–3 SEC)
- Head coach: Billy Brewer (10th season)
- Offensive coordinator: Larry Beckish (1st season)
- Offensive scheme: Option
- Defensive coordinator: Joe Lee Dunn (1st season)
- Base defense: 3–3–5
- Captains: Chad Brown; Everett Lindsay; Cory Philpot; Lynn Ross; Russ Shows
- Home stadium: Vaught–Hemingway Stadium; Mississippi Veterans Memorial Stadium

1992 Southeastern Conference football standings
	Conf.					Overall
Team	W		L		T	W		L		T
Eastern Division
No. 10 Florida xy	6	–	2	–	0	9	–	4	–	0
No. 8 Georgia x	6	–	2	–	0	10	–	2	–	0
No. 12 Tennessee	5	–	3	–	0	9	–	3	–	0
South Carolina	3	–	5	–	0	5	–	6	–	0
Vanderbilt	2	–	6	–	0	4	–	7	–	0
Kentucky	2	–	6	–	0	4	–	7	–	0
Western Division
No. 1 Alabama x$	8	–	0	–	0	13	–	0	–	0
No. 16 Ole Miss	5	–	3	–	0	9	–	3	–	0
No. 23 Mississippi State	4	–	4	–	0	7	–	5	–	0
Arkansas	3	–	4	–	1	3	–	7	–	1
Auburn	2	–	5	–	1	5	–	5	–	1
LSU	1	–	7	–	0	2	–	9	–	0
Championship: Alabama 28, Florida 21
$ – Conference champion; x – Division champion/co-champions; y – Championship game participant; Rankings from AP Poll

The 1992 Ole Miss Rebels football team represented the University of Mississippi (Ole Miss) during the 1992 NCAA Division I-A football season. The Rebels were led by 10th-year head coach Billy Brewer and played their home games at Vaught–Hemingway Stadium in Oxford, Mississippi, and alternate-site home games at Mississippi Veterans Memorial Stadium in Jackson, Mississippi. They competed as members of the Southeastern Conference, finishing in second in the Western Division with a record of 9–3 (5–3 SEC). They were invited to the 1992 Liberty Bowl, where they defeated Air Force, 13–0.

== Schedule ==
Date	Opponent	Rank	Site	TV	Result	Attendance	Source
September 5	Auburn		Vaught–Hemingway Stadium; Oxford, MS (rivalry)		W 45–21	40,000	
September 12	Tulane*		Vaught–Hemingway Stadium; Oxford, MS (rivalry)		W 35–9	30,200	
September 19	at Vanderbilt	No. 25	Vanderbilt Stadium; Nashville, TN (rivalry)		L 9–31	41,000	
September 26	at No. 18 Georgia		Sanford Stadium; Athens, GA	ABC	L 11–37	84,278	
October 3	Kentucky		Vaught–Hemingway Stadium; Oxford, MS		W 24–14	31,200	
October 17	at Arkansas		War Memorial Stadium; Little Rock, AR (rivalry)		W 17–3	53,513	
October 24	at No. 4 Alabama		Bryant–Denny Stadium; Tuscaloosa, AL (rivalry)	JPS	L 10–31	70,123	
October 31	LSU		Mississippi Veterans Memorial Stadium; Jackson, MS (rivalry)		W 32–0	47,000	
November 7	Memphis State*^{†}		Vaught–Hemingway Stadium; Oxford, MS (rivalry)		W 17–12	42,847	
November 14	Louisiana Tech*		Vaught–Hemingway Stadium; Oxford, MS		W 13–6	22,500	
November 28	No. 16 Mississippi State	No. 24	Vaught–Hemingway Stadium; Oxford, MS (Egg Bowl)	JPS	W 17–10	41,500	
December 31	vs. Air Force*	No. 20	Liberty Bowl Memorial Stadium; Memphis, TN (Liberty Bowl)	ESPN	W 13–0	32,107	
*Non-conference game; ^{†}Homecoming; Rankings from AP Poll released prior to the game
