= Derrick Oden =

American football player (born 1970)

No. 58
- Position: Linebacker

Personal information
- Born: September 29, 1970 (age 56); Los Angeles, California, U.S.
- Listed height: 5 ft 11 in (1.80 m)
- Listed weight: 230 lb (104 kg)

Career information
- High school: Hillcrest (Tuscaloosa, Alabama)
- College: Alabama (1989–1992)
- NFL draft: 1993: 6th round, 163rd overall pick

Career history
- Philadelphia Eagles (1993–1995)

Awards and highlights
- National champion (1992); First-team All-SEC (1992)

Career NFL statistics
- Tackles: 7
- Stats at Pro Football Reference

Derrick Oden (born September 29, 1970) is an American former professional football player who was a linebacker for three seasons with the Philadelphia Eagles of the National Football League (NFL). He was selected by the Eagles in the sixth round of the 1993 NFL draft after playing college football for the Alabama Crimson Tide.

== Early life and college ==
Derrick Oden was born on September 29, 1970, in Los Angeles, California. He attended Hillcrest High School in Tuscaloosa, Alabama.

He was a four-year letterman at the University of Alabama from 1989 to 1992. The 1992 Crimson Tide were consensus national champions and Oden was named first-team All-SEC by the Coaches that season.

== Professional career ==
Oden was selected by the Philadelphia Eagles in the sixth round, with the 163rd overall pick, of the 1993 NFL draft. He officially signed with the team on May 11. He played in 12 games for the Eagles during his rookie year in 1992, recording five tackles. He appeared in 11 games during the 1994 season but did not record any statistics. Oden became a free agent after the season and re-signed with the Eagles on July 21, 1995. He played in 12 games for the Eagles in 1995, posting two solo tackles. He also appeared in two playoff games that season. He became a free agent again after the 1995 season.
