= 1993 Hall of Fame Bowl =

- 7th Hall of Fame Bowl
Tennessee Volunteers	Boston College Eagles
(8–3)	(8–2–1)
SEC	Big East
38	23
Head coach: Phillip Fulmer	Head coach: Tom Coughlin
AP / Coaches / BC; 17 / 17 / 17	AP / Coaches / BC; 16 / 16 / 16
	1	2	3	4	Total
Tennessee	14	0	17	7	38
Boston College	0	7	0	16	23
- Date: January 1, 1993
- Season: 1992
- Stadium: Tampa Stadium
- Location: Tampa, Florida
- MVP: Heath Shuler (Tennessee QB)
- Referee: Jack Baker (WAC)
- Attendance: 52,056

United States TV coverage
- Network: ESPN
- Announcers: Mike Patrick, Joe Theismann

The 1993 Hall of Fame Bowl featured the 16th-ranked Boston College Eagles, and the 17th-ranked Tennessee Vols. It was the seventh edition to the Hall of Fame Bowl. The game marked the first for the Vols under new head coach Phillip Fulmer, replacing Johnny Majors after his resignation.

Tennessee scored first after quarterback Heath Shuler scored on a 1-yard touchdown run making the score 7–0 Tennessee. Shuler fired a 27-yard touchdown pass to Corey Fleming, as Tennessee led 14–0 after the first quarter. In the second quarter, Boston College's Glenn Foley threw a 12-yard touchdown pass to Mitchell making the halftime score 14–7.

In the third quarter, Shuler scored on a 14-yard touchdown run making it 21–7. After a Tennessee field goal, Shuler threw a 69-yard touchdown pass to Mose Phillips, as Tennessee took a 31–7 lead. In the fourth quarter, backup quarterback Colquitt fired a 48-yard touchdown pass to Corey Fleming as Tennessee opened up a 38–7 lead. A touchdown pass from Foley, and a 7-yard run by Campbell made the final margin 38–23.

Shuler was named the most valuable player of the game.
