= 1992 Mississippi State Bulldogs football team =

American college football season

1992 Mississippi State Bulldogs football

Peach Bowl, L 17–21 vs. North Carolina
- Conference: Southeastern Conference
- Western Division

Ranking
- AP: No. 23
- Record: 7–5 (4–4 SEC)
- Head coach: Jackie Sherrill (2nd season)
- Offensive coordinator: Watson Brown (2nd season)
- Defensive coordinator: Bill Clay (2nd season)
- Home stadium: Scott Field

1992 Southeastern Conference football standings
	Conf.					Overall
Team	W		L		T	W		L		T
Eastern Division
No. 10 Florida xy	6	–	2	–	0	9	–	4	–	0
No. 8 Georgia x	6	–	2	–	0	10	–	2	–	0
No. 12 Tennessee	5	–	3	–	0	9	–	3	–	0
South Carolina	3	–	5	–	0	5	–	6	–	0
Vanderbilt	2	–	6	–	0	4	–	7	–	0
Kentucky	2	–	6	–	0	4	–	7	–	0
Western Division
No. 1 Alabama x$	8	–	0	–	0	13	–	0	–	0
No. 16 Ole Miss	5	–	3	–	0	9	–	3	–	0
No. 23 Mississippi State	4	–	4	–	0	7	–	5	–	0
Arkansas	3	–	4	–	1	3	–	7	–	1
Auburn	2	–	5	–	1	5	–	5	–	1
LSU	1	–	7	–	0	2	–	9	–	0
Championship: Alabama 28, Florida 21
$ – Conference champion; x – Division champion/co-champions; y – Championship game participant; Rankings from AP Poll

The 1992 Mississippi State Bulldogs football team represented Mississippi State University as member of the Western Division of the Southeastern Conference (SEC) during the 1992 NCAA Division I-A football season. Led by second-year head coach Jackie Sherrill, the Bulldogs compiled a record of 7–5, with a mark of 4–4 in conference play, and finished third in the SEC Western Division.

== Schedule ==
Date	Time	Opponent	Rank	Site	TV	Result	Attendance	Source
September 5	6:30 p.m.	at Texas*	No. 21	Texas Memorial Stadium; Austin, TX	ESPN	W 28–10	70,438	
September 12	7:00 p.m.	at LSU	No. 18	Tiger Stadium; Baton Rouge, LA (rivalry)	PPV	L 3–24	68,888	
September 19	7:30 p.m.	at Memphis State*	No. 24	Liberty Bowl Memorial Stadium; Memphis, TN		W 20–16	40,067	
October 1	6:45 p.m.	No. 13 Florida	No. 24	Scott Field; Starkville, MS	ESPN	W 30–6	38,886	
October 10	6:00 p.m.	Auburn	No. 18	Scott Field; Starkville, MS		W 14–7	41,224	
October 17	11:30 a.m.	at South Carolina	No. 15	Williams–Brice Stadium; Columbia, SC	JPS	L 6–21	55,102	
October 24	1:30 p.m.	Arkansas State*	No. 25	Scott Field; Starkville, MS		W 56–6	39,566	
October 31	7:00 p.m.	at Kentucky	No. 24	Commonwealth Stadium; Lexington, KY		W 37–36	50,375	
November 7	1:30 p.m.	Arkansas	No. 19	Scott Field; Starkville, MS		W 10–3	36,103	
November 14	6:30 p.m.	No. 2 Alabama	No. 16	Scott Field; Starkville, MS (rivalry)	ESPN	L 21–30	41,320	
November 28	11:30 a.m.	at No. 24 Ole Miss	No. 16	Vaught–Hemingway Stadium; Oxford, MS (Egg Bowl)	JPS	L 10–17	41,500	
January 2	7:00 p.m.	vs. No. 19 North Carolina*	No. 24	Georgia Dome; Atlanta, GA (Peach Bowl)	ESPN	L 17–21	69,125	
*Non-conference game; Rankings from AP Poll released prior to the game; All times are in Central time

== Season summary ==
=== Florida ===
External videos
- Sleepy Robinson TD pass to Orlando Truitt vs. Florida, 1992

== Personnel ==
1992 Mississippi State Bulldogs football team roster
Players
Coaches
Offense

Pos.	#	Name	Class
QB	15	Sleepy Robinson	Sr
WR	80	Orlando Truitt

Defense

Pos.	#	Name	Class

Special teams

Pos.	#	Name	Class

Head coach

- Jackie Sherrill

Coordinators/assistant coaches

Legend

- (C) Team captain
- (S) Suspended
- (I) Ineligible
- Injured
- Redshirt
