= J. J. McCleskey =

American football player and coach (born 1970)

Tulane Green Wave
- Title: Defensive backs coach

Personal information
- Born: April 10, 1970 (age 56); Knoxville, Tennessee, U.S.
- Listed height: 5 ft 8 in (1.73 m)
- Listed weight: 180 lb (82 kg)

Career information
- Position: Defensive back (No. 44, 47)
- College: Tennessee (1989–1992)
- NFL draft: 1993: undrafted

Career history

Playing
- New Orleans Saints (1993–1996); Arizona Cardinals (1996–2000)

Coaching
- Tulane (2018–present) Defensive backs coach

Career NFL statistics
- Interceptions: 4
- Sacks: 1
- Stats at Pro Football Reference

Thomas Joseph McCleskey Jr. (born April 10, 1970) is an American football coach and former player who is the defensive backs coach for the Tulane Green Wave. He played professionally as a defensive back in the National Football League (NFL).

McCleskey played college football for the Tennessee Volunteers. He played in the NFL for the New Orleans Saints and Arizona Cardinals.

His son, Jalen McCleskey, committed to Oklahoma State University in 2014 to play college football. He later transferred to Tulane.
