= Prince Wimbley =

American gridiron football player (born 1970)

Profile
- Position: Wide receiver

Personal information
- Born: September 22, 1970 (age 56); Miami, Florida, U.S.

Career information
- High school: Miami Southridge (Miami, Florida)
- College: Alabama
- NFL draft: 1993: undrafted

Career history
- Las Vegas Posse (1994); Birmingham Barracudas (1995); Saskatchewan Roughriders (1995); Memphis Pharaohs (1996); Hamilton Tiger-Cats (1997)

Awards and highlights
- National champion (1992)

Career CFL statistics
- Receptions: 115
- Yards: 1,630
- Touchdowns: 4

Career AFL statistics
- Receptions: 5
- Yards: 56
- Touchdowns: 1
- Stats at ArenaFan.com

Prince Wimbley (born September 22, 1970) is a former American and Canadian football wide receiver in the Canadian Football League (CFL) and Arena Football League (AFL). He played college football at Alabama.
