= 1992 Georgia Bulldogs football team =

American college football season

1992 Georgia Bulldogs football

SEC Eastern Division co-champion Florida Citrus Bowl champion

Florida Citrus Bowl, W 21–14 vs. Ohio State
- Conference: Southeastern Conference
- Eastern Division

Ranking
- Coaches: No. 8
- AP: No. 8
- Record: 10–2 (6–2 SEC)
- Head coach: Ray Goff (4th season)
- Offensive coordinator: Wayne McDuffie (2nd season)
- Offensive scheme: No-huddle spread
- Defensive coordinator: Richard Bell (4th season)
- Base defense: 3–4
- Home stadium: Sanford Stadium

1992 Southeastern Conference football standings
	Conf.					Overall
Team	W		L		T	W		L		T
Eastern Division
No. 10 Florida xy	6	–	2	–	0	9	–	4	–	0
No. 8 Georgia x	6	–	2	–	0	10	–	2	–	0
No. 12 Tennessee	5	–	3	–	0	9	–	3	–	0
South Carolina	3	–	5	–	0	5	–	6	–	0
Vanderbilt	2	–	6	–	0	4	–	7	–	0
Kentucky	2	–	6	–	0	4	–	7	–	0
Western Division
No. 1 Alabama x$	8	–	0	–	0	13	–	0	–	0
No. 16 Ole Miss	5	–	3	–	0	9	–	3	–	0
No. 23 Mississippi State	4	–	4	–	0	7	–	5	–	0
Arkansas	3	–	4	–	1	3	–	7	–	1
Auburn	2	–	5	–	1	5	–	5	–	1
LSU	1	–	7	–	0	2	–	9	–	0
Championship: Alabama 28, Florida 21
$ – Conference champion; x – Division champion/co-champions; y – Championship game participant; Rankings from AP Poll

The 1992 Georgia Bulldogs football team represented the University of Georgia as a member of the Eastern Division of the Southeastern Conference (SEC) during the 1992 NCAA Division I-A football season. Led by fourth-year head coach Ray Goff, the Bulldogs compiled an overall record of 10–2, with a mark of 6–2 in conference play, finished as SEC Eastern Division co-champion, and with a victory over Ohio State in the Florida Citrus Bowl.

== Schedule ==
Date	Time	Opponent	Rank	Site	TV	Result	Attendance	Source
September 5	8:00 p.m.	at South Carolina	No. 14	Williams–Brice Stadium; Columbia, SC (rivalry)	ESPN	W 28–6	75,060	
September 12	3:30 p.m.	No. 20 Tennessee	No. 14	Sanford Stadium; Athens, GA (rivalry)	ABC	L 31–34	85,434	
September 19	1:00 p.m.	Cal State Fullerton*	No. 19	Sanford Stadium; Athens, GA		W 56–0	75,515	
September 26	3:30 p.m.	Ole Miss	No. 18	Sanford Stadium; Athens, GA	ABC	W 37–11	84,278	
October 3	12:30 p.m.	at Arkansas	No. 16	Razorback Stadium; Fayetteville, AR	JPS	W 27–3	49,412	
October 10	1:00 p.m.	No. 19 (I-AA) Georgia Southern*	No. 12	Sanford Stadium; Athens, GA	PPV	W 34–7	85,434	
October 17	12:30 p.m.	Vanderbilt^{†}	No. 10	Sanford Stadium; Athens, GA (rivalry)	JPS	W 30–20	83,067	
October 24	7:00 p.m.	at Kentucky	No. 7	Commonwealth Stadium; Lexington, KY		W 40–7	58,200	
October 31	3:30 p.m.	vs. No. 20 Florida	No. 7	Gator Bowl Stadium; Jacksonville, FL (rivalry)	ABC	L 24–26	82,429	
November 14	3:30 p.m.	at Auburn	No. 12	Jordan–Hare Stadium; Auburn, AL (rivalry)	ABC	W 14–10	85,214	
November 28	4:00 p.m.	Georgia Tech*	No. 9	Sanford Stadium; Athens, GA (rivalry)	ESPN	W 31–17	85,434	
January 1, 1993	1:30 p.m.	vs. No. 15 Ohio State*	No. 8	Florida Citrus Bowl; Orlando, FL (Florida Citrus Bowl)	ABC	W 21–14	65,861	
*Non-conference game; ^{†}Homecoming; Rankings from AP Poll released prior to the game; All times are in Eastern time

== Roster ==
1992 Georgia Bulldogs football team roster
Players
Coaches
Offense

Pos.	#	Name	Class
RB	5	Garrison Hearst	Jr
OT	73	Bernard Williams	Jr
QB	10	Eric Zeier
WR		Brian Bohannon	Jr

Defense

Pos.	#	Name	Class

Special teams

Pos.	#	Name	Class

Head coach

- Ray Goff

Coordinators/assistant coaches

Legend

- (C) Team captain
- (S) Suspended
- (I) Ineligible
- Injured
- Redshirt
