= Larry New =

American football coach

Biographical details
- Born: Seminole, Oklahoma

Coaching career (HC unless noted)
- 1968: Wheaton College (DC)
- 1969–1970: Missouri (DL)
- 1970–1974: Arkansas (DL)
- 1975–1979: South Carolina (DL)
- 1980–1981: South Carolina (DC)
- 1982–1986: Georgia Tech (DL)
- 1987–1989: Alabama (DL)
- 1990–1992: Kentucky (DC/LB)
- 1993–1994: Virginia (DT)
- 1995–1997: Georgia Tech (AHC/DL)
- 2007: Rhein Fire (DC/DL)

Administrative career (AD unless noted)
- 2001–2003: Georgia Tech (Assistant AD)
- 2003–2006: Georgia Tech (Associate AD)

Larry New is an American former football player and coach.

== Early life and education ==
New is a native of Seminole, Oklahoma and a graduate of Wheaton College.

== Coaching ==
New's first coaching position was as the defensive coordinator at Wheaton College of Illinois from 1968. He served as defensive line coach at Missouri from 1969 through 1970, Arkansas from 1970 through 1974, and South Carolina from 1975 through 1982. New was an assistant coach at Georgia Tech from 1983 through 1986. From 1987 through 1989 he was the defensive line coach at Alabama under head coach Bill Curry. New followed Curry to Kentucky as defensive coordinator, 1990-1992. New then was an assistant coach at the Virginia in 1993 and 1994 before returning as the defensive coach for Georgia Tech, 1995-1998, under head coach George O'Leary.

After retiring from coaching in 1998 New was the director of the Homer Rice Center for Sports Performance and then in 1999 became assistant director of athletics at Georgia Tech. In 2000, New was promoted to Senior Associate Director of Athletics and retired from Georgia Tech in 2007. He then went to work for the NFL as the defensive coordinator of the Rhein Fire in NFL Europe.
