= Ernest Dixon =

Ernest Dixon may refer to:

- Ernest T. Dixon Jr. (died 1996), American bishop of the United Methodist Church
- Ernest Dixon (American football) (born 1971), former professional American football linebacker
- Ernest Edward Leslie Dixon, British geologist
- Ernest Dixon (cricketer) (1854–1889), New Zealand cricketer
- Blue Dixon (Ernest Joseph Dixon, c. 1885–c. 1941), Australian rugby union player
- Ernie Dixon (1901–1941), footballer
