= Darwin Ireland =

American football player (born 1971)

No. 60, 52
- Position: Linebacker

Personal information
- Born: May 26, 1971 (age 55); Pine Bluff, Arkansas, U.S.
- Listed height: 5 ft 11 in (1.80 m)
- Listed weight: 240 lb (109 kg)

Career information
- High school: Dollarway (Pine Bluff)
- College: Arkansas
- NFL draft: 1994: undrafted

Career history
- Chicago Bears (1994–1995)
- Stats at Pro Football Reference

Darwin Ireland (born May 26, 1971) is an American former professional football player who was a linebacker for the Chicago Bears of the National Football League (NFL). He attended Dollarway High School and played college football for the Arkansas Razorbacks. He played for the Bears for three games from 1994 to 1995.
