= 1992 SEC Championship Game =

- Conference Championship.
- 1992 SEC Championship logo
Alabama Crimson Tide	Florida Gators
(11–0)	(8–3)
28	21
Head coach: Gene Stallings	Head coach: Steve Spurrier
AP / Coaches; 2 / 2	AP / Coaches; 12 / 15
	1	2	3	4	Total
Alabama	7	7	7	7	28
Florida	7	0	7	7	21
- Date: December 5, 1992
- Season: 1992
- Stadium: Legion Field
- Location: Birmingham, Alabama
- MVP: Antonio Langham, Alabama
- Favorite: Alabama by 10
- National anthem: Million Dollar Band
- Referee: Rom Gilbert
- Halftime show: The Tiny Toons, Million Dollar Band, The Pride of the Sunshine, The 5th Dimension, Lee Greenwood and Birmingham-Area Kids
- Attendance: 83,091

United States TV coverage
- Network: ABC
- Announcers: Keith Jackson (play-by-play), Bob Griese (analyst), Jack Arute (sideline)
- Nielsen ratings: 9.8

1992 Southeastern Conference football standings
	Conf.					Overall
Team	W		L		T	W		L		T
Eastern Division
No. 10 Florida xy	6	–	2	–	0	9	–	4	–	0
No. 8 Georgia x	6	–	2	–	0	10	–	2	–	0
No. 12 Tennessee	5	–	3	–	0	9	–	3	–	0
South Carolina	3	–	5	–	0	5	–	6	–	0
Vanderbilt	2	–	6	–	0	4	–	7	–	0
Kentucky	2	–	6	–	0	4	–	7	–	0
Western Division
No. 1 Alabama x$	8	–	0	–	0	13	–	0	–	0
No. 16 Ole Miss	5	–	3	–	0	9	–	3	–	0
No. 23 Mississippi State	4	–	4	–	0	7	–	5	–	0
Arkansas	3	–	4	–	1	3	–	7	–	1
Auburn	2	–	5	–	1	5	–	5	–	1
LSU	1	–	7	–	0	2	–	9	–	0
Championship: Alabama 28, Florida 21
$ – Conference champion; x – Division champion/co-champions; y – Championship game participant; Rankings from AP Poll

The 1992 SEC Championship Game was played on December 5, 1992, at Legion Field in Birmingham, Alabama. The Southeastern Conference (SEC) was the first conference in NCAA Division I college football to host a post-season conference championship game, and the 1992 game was the first time the SEC Championship Game was held. The inaugural match-up determined the 1992 SEC football champion. The Alabama Crimson Tide of the University of Alabama, winners of the SEC Western Division, defeated the Florida Gators of the University of Florida, who won the SEC Eastern Division, by a score of 28-21.

Following the game, undefeated Alabama advanced to the Sugar Bowl, where the Crimson Tide defeated the Miami Hurricanes to win the Crimson Tide's 12th national championship. Florida received an invitation to play in the Gator Bowl, where the Gators defeated the North Carolina State Wolfpack.

== Game summary ==
The Florida Gators scored first, on a five-yard touchdown reception by Errict Rhett to take a 7–0 lead in the first quarter. The Crimson Tide responded by scoring the next 21 points. The Tide's first points came later in the first quarter on a Derrick Lassic 3-yard touchdown run to tie the game at 7–7. In the second quarter, Curtis Brown would score on a 30-yard touchdown reception from Jay Barker to take a 14–7 lead at the half.

Alabama would further extend their lead to 21–7 in the third on a 15-yard Derrick Lassic touchdown run. Down by 14, the Gators would respond with a pair of touchdowns, tying the game at 21 midway through the fourth quarter. Willie Jackson would score first on a 4-yard touchdown reception on a pass from Shane Matthews late in the third, and Errict Rhett would knot the game at 21 with just over eight minutes remaining in the contest. With momentum in the favor of the Gators, with 3:16 remaining in the game, Antonio Langham would return a Matthews interception 27-yards for a touchdown in providing the final 28–21 margin.

Scoring summary

Quarter	Time	Drive			Team	Scoring information	Score	
Quarter	Time	Plays	Yards	TOP	Team	Scoring information	Alabama	Florida
1	10:03	11	77	4:57	Florida	Errict Rhett 5-yard touchdown reception from Shane Matthews, Judd Davis kick good	0	7
1	5:07	10	72	4:56	Alabama	Derrick Lassic 5-yard touchdown run, Michael Proctor kick good	7	7
2	4:49	5	42	2:32	Alabama	Curtis Brown 30-yard touchdown reception from Jay Barker, Michael Proctor kick good	14	7
3	5:14	4	66	1:33	Alabama	Derrick Lassic 15-yard touchdown run, Michael Proctor kick good	21	7
3	1:21	9	68	3:53	Florida	Willie Jackson 4-yard touchdown reception from Shane Matthews, Judd Davis kick good	21	14
4	8:09	9	51	3:39	Florida	Errict Rhett 1-yard touchdown run, Judd Davis kick good	21	21
4	3:16		27	0	Alabama	27-yard interception return by Antonio Langham, Michael Proctor kick good	28	21
"TOP" = time of possession. For other American football terms, see Glossary of American football.							28	21
