= Wide Right II =

- Non-conference game
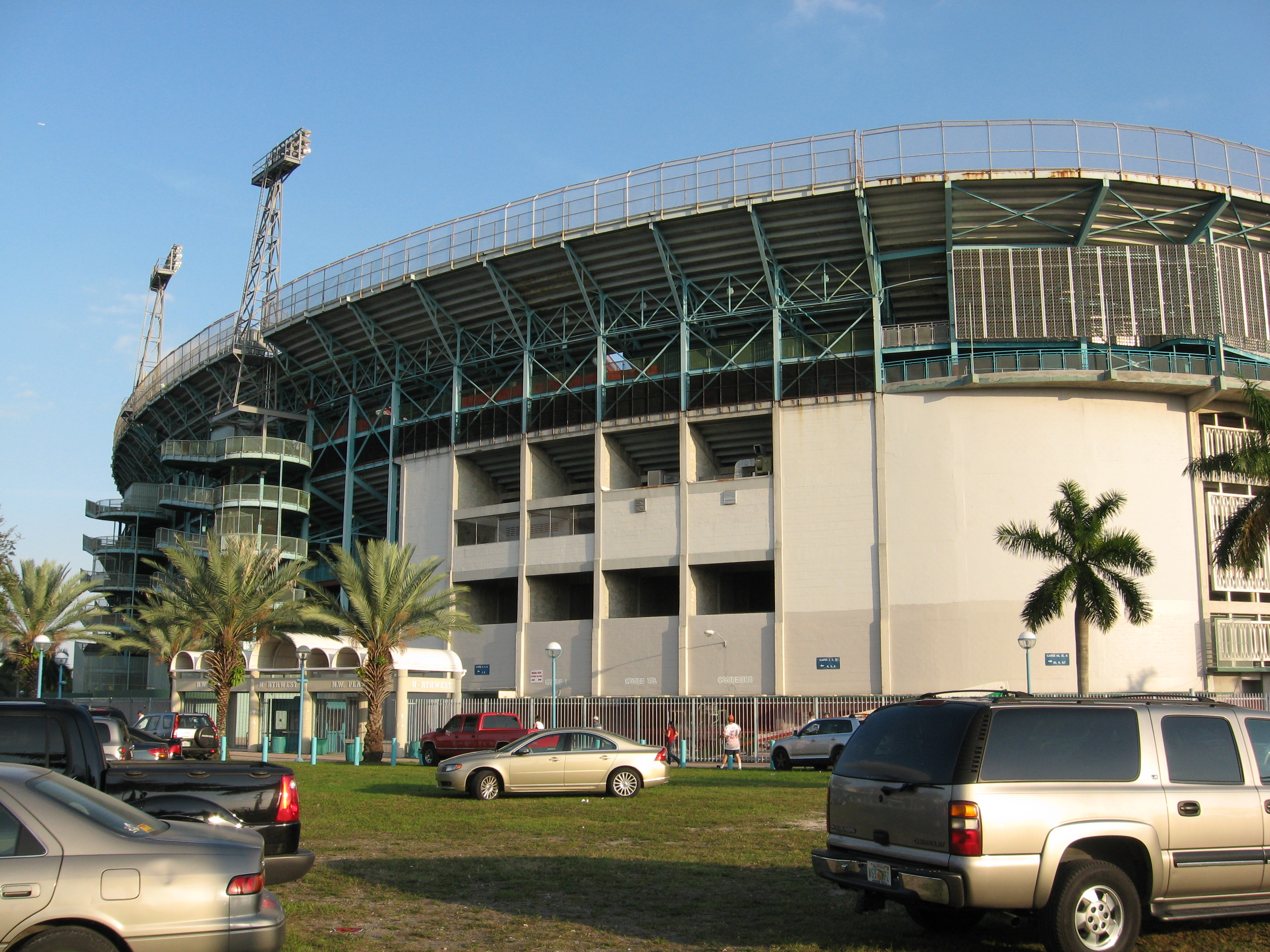
- The Miami Orange Bowl, the site of the game
Florida State Seminoles	Miami Hurricanes
(4–0)	(3–0)
16	19
Head coach: Bobby Bowden	Head coach: Dennis Erickson
AP / Coaches; 3 / 3	AP / Coaches; 2 / 2
	1	2	3	4	Total
Florida State	7	3	3	3	16
Miami	0	10	0	9	19
- Date: October 3, 1992
- Season: 1992
- Stadium: Orange Bowl
- Location: Miami, Florida
- Referee: Joe Rider
- Attendance: 77,338

United States TV coverage
- Network: ABC
- Announcers: Keith Jackson and Bob Griese

Wide Right II is a colloquial name for the 1992 college football game between the Miami Hurricanes and Florida State Seminoles. The game is notable in the Florida State–Miami football rivalry and derives its name from the colloquial name Wide Right I, played during the immediately preceding season. Like its predecessor, the game had decisive national championship implications and ended with a Florida State kicker missing a game-altering field goal in the waning seconds.

== Background ==
Miami entered the October 3, 1992, matchup of intrastate rivals as the defending national champion and second-ranked team in the country, riding a 20-game winning streak. Miami, however, appeared to be vulnerable, as Hurricane Andrew had disrupted the early portion of its schedule and Miami was unimpressive in surviving an 8-7 scare against the Arizona Wildcats the week prior. Because of Miami's lackluster performance against Arizona, the Hurricanes lost their number one ranking in the AP Poll and were dropped to number two, behind the Washington Huskies. Nevertheless, Miami featured a bevy of stars on its roster, including Heisman Trophy candidate quarterback Gino Torretta, wide receiver Lamar Thomas, and linebackers Jessie Armstead and Micheal Barrow, and the team was in the midst of an NCAA-record 58-game home winning streak at the Orange Bowl. Florida State was looking to avenge its loss to Miami in Wide Right I the season before.

== The game ==
Florida State came strong out of the gate, as Tamarick Vanover took the opening kickoff back 94 yards for a touchdown. Miami struck back in the second quarter with a 24-yard Dane Prewitt field goal and a 29-yard touchdown pass from Gino Torretta to Coleman Bell, taking the lead, 10–7. Florida State countered with a 22-yard field goal by Dan Mowrey, and the teams headed to the locker room deadlocked at 10.

Mowrey added a 38-yard field goal in the third quarter and a 41-yarder early in the fourth. Leading 16–10 with just over 9 minutes to play, the Seminoles found themselves in a position eerily similar to the season before: a 6-point lead late in the game and a field goal kicker who was 3-for-3 on the day.

Miami responded as it did the season before, going on a 7-play, 58-yard drive that culminated with a 33-yard touchdown pass from Torretta to Lamar Thomas. Torretta was drilled as he released the ball, but Thomas was able to sneak behind Clifton Abraham and make a basket catch. With the extra point, Miami seized the lead, 17–16.

Miami's defense held on the next possession, and the Florida State defense forced a punt on Miami's subsequent series. The ensuing punt proved disastrous for the Seminoles: punt returner Corey Sawyer was penalized for attempting an illegal forward pass from his own end zone, resulting in a safety for Miami. With Miami now leading 19–16, a field goal could only tie the game for the Seminoles. The Miami defense again held, but Florida State then forced the 'Canes to punt, giving the Seminoles one last chance with 1:35 left.

Quarterback Charlie Ward drove the Seminoles 59 yards and into field goal range, converting a crucial fourth-and-12 with a completion to Kez McCorvey along the way. The drive was highlighted by Matt Frier's diving, fingertip reception for 17 yards. After Ward picked up 19 yards on two quick scrambles, the Seminoles were on the Miami 22-yard line but nearly out of time. On the game's final play, Florida State called upon Mowrey to make a 39-yard field goal and tie the game at 19. With both Miami's and Florida State's national championship hopes again hanging in the balance, Mowrey, kicking into the open end of the Orange Bowl, missed wide right and collapsed face down onto the turf.

== Aftermath ==
Miami once again used a hard-fought win over its rival as a springboard for a national championship run, winning its final seven regular season games and earning a berth in the 1993 Sugar Bowl as the nation's number one team in both the AP and Coaches' Polls. This time, however, the Hurricanes could not complete the perfect season, losing to the second-ranked and eventual national champion Alabama Crimson Tide in the Sugar Bowl 34–13, and finishing 11–1 and ranked third in the country.

Unlike the previous season, when the Seminoles followed up their loss to Miami with an upset loss to Florida, Florida State rebounded and won the rest of its games, going 11–1 on the season. The Seminoles soundly defeated the Nebraska Cornhuskers in the 1993 Orange Bowl, 27–14, and, despite the loss to Miami, were ranked second in the final polls, one spot ahead of the Hurricanes.

The game was the second in a peculiar string of 5 games in 12 years in which Florida State lost to Miami due to a late missed field goal that would have won or tied the game for the Seminoles, often with national championship implications.
