= Wide Right =

Wide Right may refer to:

- Wide Right (Buffalo Bills), Scott Norwood's miss in Super Bowl XXV
- Wide Right II (Buffalo Bills), Tyler Bass' miss in the 2024 AFC Divisional Round
- Wide Right I, a missed field goal by the Florida State University Seminoles in their 1991 game against the University of Miami Hurricanes
- Wide Right II, a missed field goal by the Florida State University Seminoles in their 1992 game against the University of Miami Hurricanes
- Midfielder, association football position often referred to as a winger
