= 1992 Florida State Seminoles football team =

American college football season

1992 Florida State Seminoles football

National champion (Sagarin) ACC champion Orange Bowl champion

Orange Bowl, W 27–14 vs. Nebraska
- Conference: Atlantic Coast Conference

Ranking
- Coaches: No. 2
- AP: No. 2
- Record: 11–1 (8–0 ACC)
- Head coach: Bobby Bowden (17th season)
- Offensive coordinator: Brad Scott (3rd season)
- Offensive scheme: No-huddle spread
- Defensive coordinator: Mickey Andrews (9th season)
- Base defense: 4–3
- Captains: Robbie Baker; Reggie Freeman; Carl Simpson; Robert Stevenson
- Home stadium: Doak Campbell Stadium

1992 Atlantic Coast Conference football standings
	Conf.					Overall
Team	W		L		T	W		L		T
No. 2 Florida State $	8	–	0	–	0	11	–	1	–	0
No. 17 NC State	6	–	2	–	0	9	–	3	–	1
No. 19 North Carolina	5	–	3	–	0	9	–	3	–	0
No. 25 Wake Forest	4	–	4	–	0	8	–	4	–	0
Virginia	4	–	4	–	0	7	–	4	–	0
Georgia Tech	4	–	4	–	0	5	–	6	–	0
Clemson	3	–	5	–	0	5	–	6	–	0
Maryland	2	–	6	–	0	3	–	8	–	0
Duke	0	–	8	–	0	2	–	9	–	0
$ – Conference champion; Rankings from AP Poll

The 1992 Florida State Seminoles football team represented Florida State University as a member of the Atlantic Coast Conference (ACC) during the 1992 NCAA Division I-A football season. Led by 17th-year head coach Bobby Bowden, the Seminoles compiled an overall record of 11–1 with a mark of 8–0 in conference play, winning the ACC title in their first season competing as a member. Florida State was invited to the Orange Bowl, where the Seminoles defeated Nebraska. The team played home games at Doak Campbell Stadium in Tallahassee, Florida.

Florida State finished the season No. 2 in both the AP poll and the Coaches Poll. The team was selected as the national champion by Sagarin. The Seminoles offense scored 446 points while the defense allowed 186 points. Linebacker Marvin Jones finished in fourth place in voting for the Heisman Trophy, while quarterback Charlie Ward finished sixth.

== Schedule ==
Date	Time	Opponent	Rank	Site	TV	Result	Attendance	Source
September 5	7:00 p.m.	Duke	No. 4	Doak Campbell Stadium; Tallahassee, FL	PPV	W 48–21	60,751	
September 12	7:30 p.m.	at No. 15 Clemson	No. 5	Memorial Stadium; Clemson, SC (rivalry)	ESPN	W 24–20	83,170	
September 19	12:00 p.m.	at No. 16 NC State	No. 3	Carter–Finley Stadium; Raleigh, NC	JPS	W 34–13	53,900	
September 26	7:00 p.m.	Wake Forest	No. 3	Doak Campbell Stadium; Tallahassee, FL	PPV	W 35–7	62,915	
October 3	12:00 p.m.	at No. 2 Miami (FL)*	No. 3	Miami Orange Bowl; Miami, FL (rivalry)	ABC	L 16–19	77,338	
October 10	12:00 p.m.	North Carolina	No. 8	Doak Campbell Stadium; Tallahassee, FL	JPS	W 36–13	60,553	
October 17	4:00 p.m.	at No. 16 Georgia Tech	No. 6	Bobby Dodd Stadium; Atlanta, GA	ESPN	W 29–24	46,226	
October 31	12:00 p.m.	at No. 23 Virginia	No. 6	Scott Stadium; Charlottesville, VA (Jefferson–Eppes Trophy)	JPS	W 13–3	45,000	
November 7	12:00 p.m.	Maryland	No. 6	Doak Campbell Stadium; Tallahassee, FL	JPS	W 69–21	64,127	
November 14	2:00 p.m.	Tulane*	No. 5	Doak Campbell Stadium; Tallahassee, FL		W 70–7	60,127	
November 28	12:00 p.m.	No. 6 Florida*	No. 3	Doak Campbell Stadium; Tallahassee, FL (rivalry)	ABC	W 45–24	68,311	
January 1	8:00 p.m.	vs. No. 11 Nebraska*	No. 3	Miami Orange Bowl; Miami, FL (Orange Bowl)	NBC	W 27–14	57,324	
*Non-conference game; Rankings from AP Poll released prior to the game; All times are in Eastern time

== Game summaries ==
=== Miami (FL) ===
No. 3 Florida State at No. 2 Miami (FL)

Team	1	2	3	4	Total
Seminoles	7	3	3	3	16
• Hurricanes	0	10	0	9	19

- Date: October 3
- Location: Orange Bowl
  Miami
- Game start: 12:00 p.m. EDT
- Game attendance: 77,338
- Game weather: 83 °F (28 °C), Cloudy, Wind SE 14 mph (23 km/h)
- Referee: Joe Rider
- TV announcers (ABC): Keith Jackson, Bob Griese

Scoring summary
1		FSU	Tamarick Vanover 94-yard kickoff return (Mowrey kick)	FSU 7–0
2		UM	Dane Prewitt 24-yard field goal	FSU 7–3
2	7:36	UM	C. Bell 29-yard pass from G. Torretta (Prewitt kick)	MIA 10–7
2		FSU	Dan Mowrey 22-yard field goal	Tied 10–10
3		FSU	Dan Mowrey 38-yard field goal	FSU 13–10
4		FSU	Dan Mowrey 41-yard field goal	FSU 16–10
4		UM	L. Thomas 33-yard pass G. Torretta (Prewitt kick)	MIA 17–16
4		UM	Team safety	MIA 19–16

=== Vs. Nebraska—Orange Bowl ===
No. 3 Florida State vs. No. 11 Nebraska

Team	1	2	3	4	Total
• Seminoles	7	13	7	0	27
Cornhuskers	0	7	0	7	14

- Date: January 1
- Location: Miami Orange Bowl
  Miami
- Game attendance: 57,324
- Referee: Bill Goss (SEC)
- TV announcers (NBC): Don Criqui, Bob Trumpy, John Dockery

== Roster ==
1992 Florida State Seminoles football team roster
Players
Coaches
Offense

Pos.	#	Name	Class
FB	44	William Floyd	Jr
WR	12	Matt Frier	Jr
QB	17	Charlie Ward	Jr

Defense

Pos.	#	Name	Class
CB	2	Clifton Abraham	So
LB	10	Derrick Brooks	So
LB	97	Reggie Freeman	Sr
CB	4	Corey Fuller	So
LB	55	Marvin Jones	Sr

Special teams

Pos.	#	Name	Class

Head coach

- Bobby Bowden

Coordinators/assistant coaches

Legend

- (C) Team captain
- (S) Suspended
- (I) Ineligible
- Injured
- Redshirt

== Awards and honors ==
- Marvin Jones: Butkus Award, Lombardi Award

== Team players in the NFL ==
The following were selected in the 1993 NFL draft.

Player	Position	Round	Overall	NFL team
Marvin Jones	Linebacker	1	4	New York Jets
Carl Simpson	Defensive tackle	2	35	Chicago Bears
Dan Footman	Defensive end	2	42	Cleveland Browns
Reggie Freeman	Linebacker	2	53	New Orleans Saints
Sterling Palmer	Defensive end	4	101	Washington Redskins
Shannon Baker	Wide receiver	8	205	Atlanta Falcons
