= 1993 New Orleans Saints season =

NFL team season

- General manager: Jim Finks (resigned July 14); Jim Miller
- Head coach: Jim Mora
- Home stadium: Louisiana Superdome

Results
- Record: 8–8
- Division place: 2nd NFC West
- Playoffs: Did not qualify
- Pro Bowlers: LB Rickey Jackson; LB Renaldo Turnbull; KR Tyrone Hughes

The 1993 New Orleans Saints season was the team's 27th as a member of the National Football League (NFL). They were unable to match their previous season's output of 12–4, winning only eight games despite starting the season 5–0. The team failed to qualify for the playoffs for the first time in four years.

Quarterback Bobby Hebert, who was the Saints' starter from late 1985 through 1992, save for a season-long holdout in 1990, signed as a free agent with the division rival Atlanta Falcons. Wade Wilson, who had fallen out of favor with the Minnesota Vikings after the hiring of coach Dennis Green in 1992, was signed as Hebert's replacement.

During a loss to the New York Giants on Monday Night Football, fans in the Louisiana Superdome let out a sarcastic cheer when Wilson was injured. The incident enraged coach Jim Mora, who let loose with a tirade during his post-game press conference. After the season, Hoby Brenner, Joel Hilgenberg, and Dalton Hilliard retired.

== Offseason ==
=== Organizational changes ===
Jim Finks, the club's president and general manager since January 1986, was diagnosed with lung cancer in April. He was limited to consulting with team officials by telephone since undergoing chemotherapy. During his absence, most of Finks' day-to-day duties were handled by vice president of administration Jim Miller. On July 14, Finks resigned from all his duties to concentrate on the treatment of his illness.

=== NFL draft ===
1993 New Orleans Saints draft
Round	Pick	Player	Position	College	Notes
1	8	Willie Roaf * ^{†}	Offensive tackle	Louisiana Tech	
1	20	Irv Smith	Tight end	Notre Dame	
2	53	Reggie Freeman	Linebacker	Florida State	
4	89	Lorenzo Neal *	Fullback	Fresno State	
4	109	Derek Brown	Running back	Nebraska	
5	137	Tyrone Hughes *	Cornerback	Nebraska	
6	165	Ronnie Dixon	Defensive tackle	Cincinnati	
7	193	Othello Henderson	Defensive back	UCLA	
8	221	Jon Kirksey	Defensive tackle	Sacramento State	
Made roster † Pro Football Hall of Fame * Made at least one Pro Bowl during career

== Personnel ==
=== Staff ===
1993 New Orleans Saints staff
Front office: Owner/General Partner – Tom Benson; Vice President of Administration – Jim Miller; Director of player personnel – Bill Kuharich; Head coaches: Head coach – Jim E. Mora; Offensive coaches: Offensive coordinator/Quarterbacks – Carl Smith; Running Backs – Jim Skipper; Wide receivers – Steve Walters; Offensive line – Paul Boudreau	Defensive coaches: Defensive coordinator – Steve Sidwell; Defensive line – John Pease; Linebackers – Vic Fangio; Defensive backs – Jim L. Mora; Special teams coaches: Special teams/Tight Ends – Joe Marciano; Strength and conditioning: Strength and conditioning – Russell Paternostro

=== Roster ===
1993 New Orleans Saints roster
Quarterbacks (QB): 16 Mike Buck; 4 Steve Walsh; 18 Wade Wilson; Running backs (RB): 24 Derek Brown; 21 Dalton Hilliard; 25 Fred McAfee KR; 22 Brad Muster FB; 36 Derrick Ned FB; Wide receivers (WR): 80 Marcus Dowdell; 89 Quinn Early; 84 Eric Martin; 13 J. J. McCleskey; 86 Pat Newman; 83 Torrance Small; 88 Floyd Turner; Tight ends (TE): 85 Hoby Brenner; 82 Irv Smith; 49 Tommie Stowers; 87 Frank Wainright LS	Offensive linemen (OL): 78 Tom Backes T; 71 Richard Cooper T; 72 Jim Dombrowski G; 62 Jay Hilgenberg; 68 Paul Jetton C/G; 60 Derek Kennard G; 70 Chris Port G; 77 Willie Roaf T; Defensive linemen (DL): 95 Ronnie Dixon NT; 63 Karl Dunbar DE; 91 Robert Goff; 93 Wayne Martin DE; 69 Les Miller NT; 94 Jim Wilks	Linebackers (LB): 55 Reggie Freeman ILB; 57 Rickey Jackson OLB; 53 Vaughan Johnson ILB; 51 Sam Mills ILB; 99 Joel Smeenge OLB; 97 Renaldo Turnbull OLB; 90 James Williams ILB; 92 DeMond Winston OLB; Defensive backs (DB): 28 Gene Atkins FS; 26 Vince Buck CB; 45 Israel Byrd CB; 41 Toi Cook CB; 38 Othello Henderson SS; 33 Tyrone Hughes; 43 Tyrone Legette CB; 46 Sean Lumpkin FS; 37 Jimmy Spencer CB; 29 Keith Taylor SS; Special teams (ST): 7 Morten Andersen K; 6 Tommy Barnhardt P	Practice squad: 64 Steve Gordon C; 35 Shane Pahukoa S; Reserve: 81 Jesse Anderson TE (IR); 40 George Coghill S (IR); 32 Vaughn Dunbar RB (IR); 61 Joel Hilgenberg C (IR); 27 Reggie Jones CB (IR); 39 Brett Maxie S (IR); 23 Lorenzo Neal FB (IR); 79 Royce Nelson G (IR); 73 Frank Warren DE (IR); 53 active, 9 inactive, 2 practice squad Rookies in italics

== Regular season ==
=== Schedule ===
Week	Date	Opponent	Result	Record	Venue	Attendance
1	September 5	Houston Oilers	**W** 33–21	1–0	Louisiana Superdome	69,029
2	September 12	at **Atlanta Falcons**	**W** 34–31	2–0	Georgia Dome	64,287
3	September 19	Detroit Lions	**W** 14–3	3–0	Louisiana Superdome	69,039
4	September 26	**San Francisco 49ers**	**W** 16–13	4–0	Louisiana Superdome	69,041
5	October 3	at **Los Angeles Rams**	**W** 37–6	5–0	Anaheim Stadium	50,709
6	Bye					
7	October 17	at Pittsburgh Steelers	**L** 14–37	5–1	Three Rivers Stadium	56,056
8	October 24	**Atlanta Falcons**	**L** 15–26	5–2	Louisiana Superdome	69,043
9	October 31	at Phoenix Cardinals	**W** 20–17	6–2	Sun Devil Stadium	36,778
10	Bye					
11	November 14	Green Bay Packers	**L** 17–19	6–3	Louisiana Superdome	69,043
12	November 22	at **San Francisco 49ers**	**L** 7–42	6–4	Candlestick Park	66,500
13	November 28	at Minnesota Vikings	**W** 17–14	7–4	Hubert H. Humphrey Metrodome	53,030
14	December 5	at Cleveland Browns	**L** 13–17	7–5	Cleveland Municipal Stadium	60,388
15	December 12	**Los Angeles Rams**	**L** 20–23	7–6	Louisiana Superdome	69,033
16	December 20	New York Giants	**L** 14–24	7–7	Louisiana Superdome	69,036
17	December 26	at Philadelphia Eagles	**L** 26–37	7–8	Veterans Stadium	50,085
18	January 2, 1994	Cincinnati Bengals	**W** 20–13	8–8	Louisiana Superdome	58,036
Note: Intra-division opponents are in **bold** text.

=== Game summaries ===
==== Week 1: Vs Houston Oilers ====
Week 1: Houston Oilers at New Orleans Saints – Game summary

Quarter	1	2	3	4	Total
Oilers	7	0	0	14	**21**
**Saints**	3	10	6	14	**33**

at Louisiana Superdome, New Orleans, Louisiana

- Date: September 5
- Game time: 7:00 p.m. CDT
- Game weather: None (indoor stadium)
- Game attendance: 69,029
- TV announcers (ESPN): Mike Patrick and Joe Theismann
- Box score

Game information

**First quarter**

- HOU – Haywood Jeffires 6-yard pass from Warren Moon (Al Del Greco kick). Oilers 7–0.
- NO – Morten Andersen 28-yard field goal. Oilers 7–3.

**Second quarter**

- NO – Dalton Hilliard 2-yard run (Morten Andersen kick). Saints 10–7.
- NO – Morten Andersen 37-yard field goal. Saints 13–7.

**Third quarter**

- NO – Morten Andersen 18-yard field goal. Saints 16–7.
- NO – Morten Andersen 47-yard field goal. Saints 19–7.

**Fourth quarter**

- NO – Frank Warren 47-yard fumble return (Morten Andersen kick). Saints 26–7.
- NO – Derek Brown 2-yard run (Morten Andersen kick). Saints 33–7.
- HOU – Cody Carlson 1-yard run (Al Del Greco kick). Saints 33–14.
- HOU – Marcus Robertson 80-yard fumble return (Al Del Greco kick). Saints 33–21.

**Top passers**

- HOU – Warren Moon – 21/32, 241 yards, TD, INT
- NO – Wade Wilson – 16/25, 206 yards

**Top rushers**

- HOU – Lorenzo White – 15 rushes, 59 yards
- NO – Lorenzo Neal – 13 rushes, 89 yards

**Top receivers**

- HOU – Curtis Duncan – 4 receptions, 90 yards
- NO – Eric Martin – 7 receptions, 111 yards

=== Standings ===
NFC West
	W	L	T	PCT	PF	PA	STK
^{(2)} San Francisco 49ers	10	6	0	.625	473	295	L2
New Orleans Saints	8	8	0	.500	317	343	W1
Atlanta Falcons	6	10	0	.375	316	385	L3
Los Angeles Rams	5	11	0	.313	221	367	W1
