= 1992 Kansas State Wildcats football team =

American college football season

1992 Kansas State Wildcats football
- Conference: Big Eight Conference
- Record: 5–6 (2–5 Big 8)
- Head coach: Bill Snyder (4th season)
- Offensive coordinator: Del Miller (4th season)
- Offensive scheme: Multiple
- Co-defensive coordinators: Jim Leavitt (2nd season); Bob Stoops (2nd season)
- Base defense: 4–3
- Home stadium: KSU Stadium

1992 Big Eight Conference football standings
	Conf.					Overall
Team	W		L		T	W		L		T
No. 14 Nebraska $	6	–	1	–	0	9	–	3	–	0
No. 13 Colorado %	5	–	1	–	1	9	–	2	–	1
No. 22 Kansas	4	–	3	–	0	8	–	4	–	0
Oklahoma	3	–	2	–	2	5	–	4	–	2
Oklahoma State	2	–	4	–	1	4	–	6	–	1
Kansas State	2	–	5	–	0	5	–	6	–	0
Iowa State	2	–	5	–	0	4	–	7	–	0
Missouri	2	–	5	–	0	3	–	8	–	0
$ – Bowl Coalition representative as champion % – Bowl Coalition at-large representative; Rankings from AP Poll

The 1992 Kansas State Wildcats football team represented Kansas State University in the 1992 NCAA Division I-A football season. The team's head football coach was Bill Snyder. The Wildcats played their home games in KSU Stadium. The 1992 season saw the Wildcats finish with a record of 5–6, and a 2–5 record in Big Eight Conference play. The season ended with a loss against Nebraska in the 1992 Coca-Cola Classic. This was not considered a post-season game.

The team played a Thursday night game on ESPN on November 5, 1992, against Iowa State. The Wildcats had their first undefeated home season (5–0) since 1934.

== Schedule ==
Date	Time	Opponent	Site	TV	Result	Attendance	Source
September 19	6:30 p.m.	No. 16 (I-AA) Montana*	KSU Stadium; Manhattan, KS		W 27–12	32,712	
September 26	6:30 p.m.	Temple*	KSU Stadium; Manhattan, KS		W 35–14	28,833	
October 3	12:30 p.m.	New Mexico State*	KSU Stadium; Manhattan, KS		W 19–0	33,310	
October 10	1:00 p.m.	at Kansas	Memorial Stadium; Lawrence, KS (rivalry)		L 7–31	52,000	
October 17	2:00 p.m.	at Utah State*	Romney Stadium; Logan, UT	KSN	L 16–28	12,472	
October 24	1:10 p.m.	at No. 9 Colorado	Folsom Field; Boulder, CO (rivalry)	KSN	L 7–54	52,235	
October 31	1:30 p.m.	at Oklahoma	Oklahoma Memorial Stadium; Norman, OK		L 14–16	60,230	
November 5	7:00 p.m.	Iowa State^{†}	KSU Stadium; Manhattan, KS (rivalry)	ESPN	W 22–13	23,815	
November 14	1:00 p.m.	at Missouri	Faurot Field; Columbia, MO		L 14–27	37,093	
November 21	1:10 p.m.	Oklahoma State	KSU Stadium; Manhattan, KS		W 10–0	20,197	
December 5	10:00 p.m.	vs. No. 11 Nebraska	Tokyo Dome; Tokyo, Japan (Coca-Cola Classic, rivalry)		L 24–38	50,000	
*Non-conference game; ^{†}Homecoming; Rankings from AP Poll released prior to the game; All times are in Central time; Source:

== Roster ==
1992 Kansas State Wildcats football team roster
Players
Coaches
Offense

Pos.	#	Name	Class
WR	2	Andre Coleman	Jr
OT	73	Barrett Brooks	So
RB	1	Eric Gallon	Sr
QB	5	Chad May	So
C	72	Quentin Neujahr	Jr
QB	13	Jason Smargiasso	Sr

Defense

Pos.	#	Name	Class
LB	29	Mike Ekeler	So
LB	9	Percell Gaskins	So
LB	45	Kirby Hocutt	So
CB	4	Thomas Randolph	Jr
LB	36	Brent Venables	Sr

Special teams

Pos.	#	Name	Class

Head coach

- Bill Snyder

Coordinators/assistant coaches

- Del Miller – Offensive Coordinator & assistant head coach
- John Latina – Offensive line & running game coordinator
- Dana Dimel – Offensive line
- Bob Stoops – co-Defensive Coordinator
- Jim Leavitt – co-Defensive Coordinator & linebackers
- John Hendrick – Defensive line
- Mike Stoops – Defensive ends
- Ben Griffith – Assistant
- Nick Quartaro – Assistant

Legend

- (C) Team captain
- (S) Suspended
- (I) Ineligible
- Injured
- Redshirt
