= 1992 Kansas Jayhawks football team =

American college football season

1992 Kansas Jayhawks football

Aloha Bowl champion

Aloha Bowl, W 23–20 vs. BYU
- Conference: Big Eight Conference

Ranking
- Coaches: No. 23
- AP: No. 22
- Record: 8–4 (4–3 Big 8)
- Head coach: Glen Mason (5th season)
- Offensive coordinator: Pat Ruel (5th season)
- Home stadium: Memorial Stadium

1992 Big Eight Conference football standings
	Conf.					Overall
Team	W		L		T	W		L		T
No. 14 Nebraska $	6	–	1	–	0	9	–	3	–	0
No. 13 Colorado %	5	–	1	–	1	9	–	2	–	1
No. 22 Kansas	4	–	3	–	0	8	–	4	–	0
Oklahoma	3	–	2	–	2	5	–	4	–	2
Oklahoma State	2	–	4	–	1	3	–	7	–	1
Kansas State	2	–	5	–	0	5	–	6	–	0
Iowa State	2	–	5	–	0	4	–	7	–	0
Missouri	2	–	5	–	0	3	–	8	–	0
$ – Bowl Coalition representative as champion % – Bowl Coalition at-large representative; Rankings from AP Poll

The 1992 Kansas Jayhawks football team represented the University of Kansas as a member of the Big Eight Conference during the 1992 NCAA Division I-A football season. Led by fifth-year head coach Glen Mason, the Jayhawks compiled an overall record of 8–4 with a mark of 4–3 in conference play, placing third in the Big 8. Kansas was invited to the Aloha Bowl, where they beat BYU. The team played home games at Memorial Stadium in Lawrence, Kansas.

== Schedule ==
Date	Time	Opponent	Rank	Site	TV	Result	Attendance	Source
September 5	3:00 p.m.	at Oregon State*		Parker Stadium; Corvallis, OR		W 49–20	28,591	
September 12	1:00 p.m.	Ball State*		Memorial Stadium; Lawrence, KS		W 62–10	38,500	
September 19	6:00 p.m.	at Tulsa*		Skelly Stadium; Tulsa, OK	KSMO	W 40–7	34,986	
September 24	7:00 p.m.	California*	No. 24	Memorial Stadium; Lawrence, KS	ESPN	L 23–27	44,500	
October 10	1:00 p.m.	Kansas State		Memorial Stadium; Lawrence, KS (Sunflower Showdown)	KSN	W 31–7	52,000	
October 17	1:00 p.m.	at Iowa State	No. 25	Cyclone Stadium; Ames, IA		W 50–47	38,331	
October 24	1:00 p.m.	Oklahoma^{†}	No. 22	Memorial Stadium; Lawrence, KS	PPV	W 27–10	43,500	
October 31	1:00 p.m.	Oklahoma State	No. 18	Memorial Stadium; Lawrence, KS		W 26–18	31,500	
November 7	6:30 p.m.	at No. 7 Nebraska	No. 13	Memorial Stadium; Lincoln, NE (rivalry)	ESPN	L 7–49	76,165	
November 14	2:30 p.m.	No. 13 Colorado	No. 20	Memorial Stadium; Lawrence, KS	ABC	L 18–25	43,000	
November 21	1:00 p.m.	at Missouri	No. 22	Faurot Field; Columbia, MO (Border War)		L 17–22	30,845	
December 25	3:30 p.m.	vs. No. 25 BYU		Aloha Stadium; Halawa, HI (Aloha Bowl)	ABC	W 23–20	42,933	
*Non-conference game; ^{†}Homecoming; Rankings from AP Poll released prior to the game; All times are in Central time; Source:

== Roster ==
1992 Kansas Jayhawks football team roster
Players
Coaches
Offense

Pos.	#	Name	Class
G	66	Hessley Hempstead	So
OT	54	Rod Jones	Fr
QB	15	Mark Williams	Fr

Defense

Pos.	#	Name	Class
DT	93	Gilbert Brown	Sr
LB	39	Don Davis	Fr
DB	8	Kwamie Lassiter	So
DB	3	Gerald McBurrows	So
DT	72	Chris Maumalanga	Jr
DT	71	Dana Stubblefield	Sr

Special teams

Pos.	#	Name	Class

Head coach

- Glen Mason

Coordinators/assistant coaches

Legend

- (C) Team captain
- (S) Suspended
- (I) Ineligible
- Injured
- Redshirt
