= 1992 Oklahoma Sooners football team =

American college football season

1992 Oklahoma Sooners football
- Conference: Big Eight Conference
- Record: 5–4–2 (3–2–2 Big 8)
- Head coach: Gary Gibbs (4th season)
- Offensive coordinator: Larry Coker (3rd season)
- Offensive scheme: Pro-style
- Defensive coordinator: Tom Hayes (2nd season)
- Base defense: 5–2
- Captains: Reggie Barnes; Cale Gundy; Kenyon Rasheed; Darnell Walker
- Home stadium: Oklahoma Memorial Stadium

1992 Big Eight Conference football standings
	Conf.					Overall
Team	W		L		T	W		L		T
No. 14 Nebraska $	6	–	1	–	0	9	–	3	–	0
No. 13 Colorado %	5	–	1	–	1	9	–	2	–	1
No. 22 Kansas	4	–	3	–	0	8	–	4	–	0
Oklahoma	3	–	2	–	2	5	–	4	–	2
Oklahoma State	2	–	4	–	1	4	–	6	–	1
Kansas State	2	–	5	–	0	5	–	6	–	0
Iowa State	2	–	5	–	0	4	–	7	–	0
Missouri	2	–	5	–	0	3	–	8	–	0
$ – Bowl Coalition representative as champion % – Bowl Coalition at-large representative; Rankings from AP Poll

The 1992 Oklahoma Sooners football team represented the University of Oklahoma during the 1992 NCAA Division I-A football season. They played their home games at Oklahoma Memorial Stadium and competed as members of the Big Eight Conference. They were coached by fourth-year head coach Gary Gibbs.

== Schedule ==
Date	Time	Opponent	Rank	Site	TV	Result	Attendance	Source
September 3	7:00 p.m.	at Texas Tech*	No. 15	Jones Stadium; Lubbock, TX	ESPN	W 34–9	48,691	
September 12	1:30 p.m.	Arkansas State*	No. 13	Oklahoma Memorial Stadium; Norman, OK		W 61–0	66,761	
September 19	11:00 a.m.	USC*	No. 13	Oklahoma Memorial Stadium; Norman, OK	ABC	L 10–20	70,215	
October 3	1:30 p.m.	Iowa State	No. 19	Oklahoma Memorial Stadium; Norman, OK	PSN	W 17–3	65,622	
October 10	2:30 p.m.	vs. Texas*	No. 16	Cotton Bowl; Dallas, TX (Red River Shootout)	ESPN	L 24–34	75,587	
October 17	6:30 p.m.	at No. 7 Colorado		Folsom Field; Boulder, CO	ESPN	T 24–24	52,454	
October 24	1:00 p.m.	at No. 22 Kansas		Memorial Stadium; Lawrence, KS	PPV	L 10–27	43,500	
October 31	1:30 p.m.	Kansas State		Oklahoma Memorial Stadium; Norman, OK	PSN	W 16–14	60,230	
November 7	1:30 p.m.	Missouri		Oklahoma Memorial Stadium; Norman, OK (rivalry)		W 51–17	61,532	
November 14	2:00 p.m.	at Oklahoma State		Lewis Field; Stillwater, OK (Bedlam Series)		T 15–15	50,440	
November 27	12:30 p.m.	No. 12 Nebraska		Oklahoma Memorial Stadium; Norman, OK (rivalry)	ABC	L 9–33	69,770	
*Non-conference game; Rankings from AP Poll released prior to the game; All times are in Central time; Source:

== Rankings ==
Ranking movements Legend: ██ Increase in ranking ██ Decrease in ranking — = Not ranked
	Week																
Poll	Pre	1	2	3	4	5	6	7	8	9	10	11	12	13	14	15	Final
AP	15	15	13	13	20	19	16	—	—	—	—	—	—	—	—	—	—
Coaches	12	12	12	12	20	20	16	—	25	—	—	—	—	—	—	—	—

== Game summaries ==
=== Texas ===
#16 Oklahoma Sooners (3–1) vs. Texas Longhorns (2–2)

Quarter	1	2	3	4	Total
Texas	7	10	10	7	34
Oklahoma	7	3	0	14	24

at Cotton Bowl, Dallas, Texas

- Date: October 10, 1992
- Game weather: Clear, 83 °F (28 °C)
- Game attendance: 75,587
- Referee: Thomas
- Box Score

Game information

First quarter

- OU – P.J. Mills 9-yard pass from Cale Gundy (Scott Blanton kick), 11:50. Oklahoma 7–0. Drive: 7 plays, 80 yards.
- UT – Justin McLemore 22-yard pass from Peter Gardere (Scott Szeredy kick), 6:33. Tie 7–7. Drive: 11 plays, 91 yards.

Second quarter

- UT – Scott Szeredy 25-yard field goal, 12:35. Texas 10–7. Drive: 8 plays, 19 yards.
- OU – Scott Blanton 51-yard field goal, 8:29. Tie 10–10. Drive: 11 plays, 51 yards.
- UT – Jason Burleson 31-yard pass from Peter Gardere (Scott Szeredy kick), 3:09. Texas 17–10. Drive: 10 plays, 80 yards.

Third quarter

- UT – Phil Brown 13-yard run (Scott Szeredy kick), 13:06. Texas 24–10. Drive: 6 plays, 70 yards.
- UT – Scott Szeredy 27-yard field goal, 5:16. Texas 27–10. Drive: 9 plays, 69 yards.

Fourth quarter

- UT – Phil Brown 3-yard run (Scott Szeredy kick), 14:27. Texas 34–10. Drive: 4 plays, 42 yards.
- OU – Corey Warren 17-yard pass from Cale Gundy (pass good), 7:42. Texas 34–18. Drive: 8 plays, 71 yards.
- OU – Earnest Williams 25-yard pass from Cale Gundy (run failed), 2:02. Texas 34–24. Drive: 4 plays, 57 yards.

Top passers

- UT – Peter Gardere – 18/32, 274 yards, 2 TD, INT
- OU – Cale Gundy – 17/38, 276 yards, 2 TD, 3 INT

Top rushers

- UT – Curtis Jackson – 15 rushes, 75 yards
- OU – Kenyon Rasheed – 13 rushes, 56 yards

Top receivers

- UT – Darrick Duke – 3 receptions, 77 yards
- OU – Corey Warren – 9 receptions, 187 yards, TD

== Roster ==
1992 Oklahoma Sooners football team roster
Players
Coaches
Offense

Pos.	#	Name	Class
TE	86	Rickey Brady	Jr
RB	23	Dewell Brewer	Sr
QB	12	Cale Gundy (C)	Jr
TE	82	Joey Mickey	Sr
WR	17	P.J. Mills	Fr
OT	64	Paul Moriarty	Sr
WR	83	John Nelson	Jr
WR	89	JaJuan Penny	Fr
FB	33	Kenyon Rasheed (C)	Sr
WR	2	Corey Warren	Jr
RB	20	Earnest Williams	Jr

Defense

Pos.	#	Name	Class
OLB	40	Reggie Barnes (C)	Sr
DE	72	Aubrey Beavers	Jr
LB	88	Trey Tippens	Sr
DB	28	Darnell Walker (C)	Sr

Special teams

Pos.	#	Name	Class
K	16	Scott Blanton	So

Head coach

- Gary Gibbs

Coordinators/assistant coaches

- Larry Coker – Offensive coordinator
- Mike Jones – Running backs
- Clarence James – Wide receivers
- Charley North – Tight ends and special teams
- Tom Hayes – Defensive coordinator
- John Blake – Defensive line
- Lucious Selmon – Outside linebacker and defensive end
- Johnny Barr – Linebackers
- Bobby Proctor – Defensive backs

Legend

- (C) Team captain
- (S) Suspended
- (I) Ineligible
- Injured
- Redshirt

Roster

== NFL draft ==
The following players were selected in the 1993 NFL draft following the season.

Round	Pick	Player	Position	NFL team
7	178	Darnell Walker	Defensive back	Atlanta Falcons
7	190	Joey Mickey	Tight end	Philadelphia Eagles
