= Wide Right I =

- Non-conference game
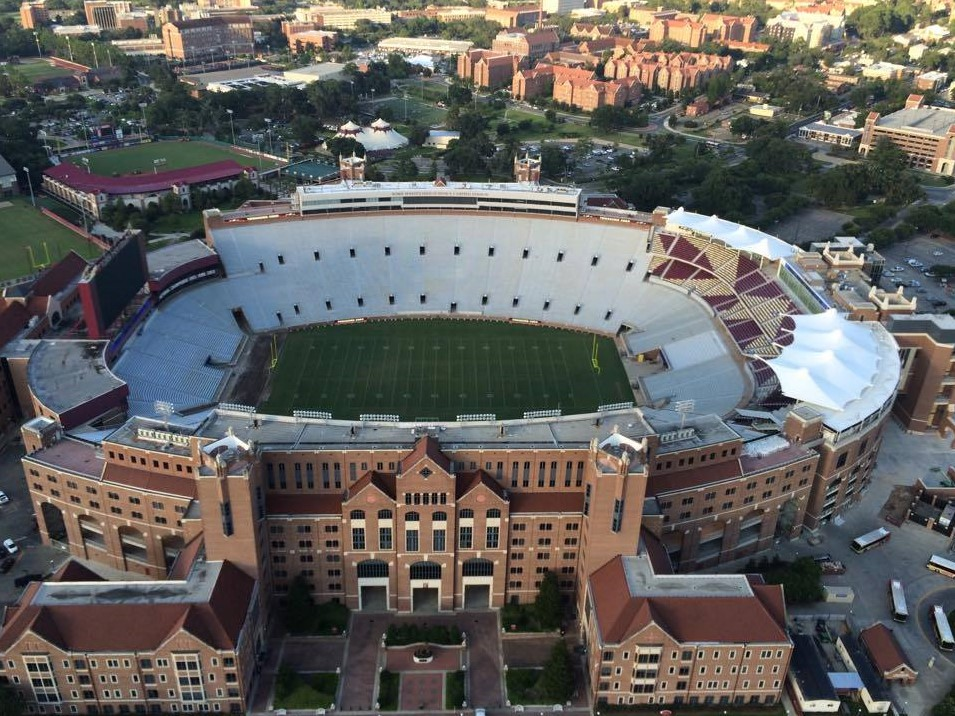
- Doak Campbell Stadium, the site of the game
Miami Hurricanes	Florida State Seminoles
(8–0)	(10–0)
17	16
Head coach: Dennis Erickson	Head coach: Bobby Bowden
AP / Coaches; 2 / 2	AP / Coaches; 1 / 1
	1	2	3	4	Total
Miami	7	0	0	10	17
Florida State	3	7	3	3	16
- Date: November 16, 1991
- Season: 1991
- Stadium: Doak Campbell Stadium
- Location: Tallahassee, Florida
- Favorite: Florida State
- Attendance: 63,442

United States TV coverage
- Network: ABC
- Announcers: Keith Jackson, Bob Griese

Wide Right I is the colloquial name for a 1991 college football game between the Miami Hurricanes and Florida State Seminoles. The game is one of the most significant in the history of the Florida State–Miami football rivalry, and its name is a reference to its dramatic ending: with 29 seconds remaining, Florida State kicker Gerry Thomas missed a 34-yard potential game-winning field goal "wide to the right." It was the 26th meeting between the first- and second-ranked teams in the AP Poll and only the second between top-ranked teams from the same state (the other being the 1968 Purdue–Notre Dame game).

Miami's win was the fourth time in five years that the Hurricanes knocked Florida State out of national championship contention. The game was also the first of a peculiar string of five over the next 12 years in which Florida State lost to Miami due to a late missed field goal that would have won or tied the game, often with national championship implications at stake. Florida State suffered an immediate case of déjà vu when kicker Dan Mowrey missed a field goal wide right on the final play of the 1992 meeting between the schools, a 19–16 Miami win known as "Wide Right II." In later years, two additional "Wide Rights" and a "Wide Left" followed.

== Background ==
The November 16 No. 1 vs. No. 2 showdown between Sunshine State rivals was described as "the most highly anticipated regular season clash" since the 1971 Nebraska-Oklahoma game. Top-ranked Florida State entered the game with a 10–0 record and a quarterback, Casey Weldon, who was undefeated as a starter. The Seminoles featured a high-flying offense that was averaging 41 points per game (third in the nation in scoring) and had earlier in the season shocked the college football world by scoring 51 points in a blowout win over the then-No. 4 Michigan Wolverines at Michigan Stadium. Meanwhile, second-ranked Miami had raced to an 8-0 record on the strength of a defense that was ranked first in the nation in scoring and had not allowed a first-half touchdown all season. The Hurricane defense had surrendered just 58 points all season, and Miami carried a 7-game winning streak against top-ranked opponents into the clash. Miami was outscoring its opponents by an average of 28.9 points per game; Florida State, by 25.9. The Seminoles entered with a then-school record 16-game winning streak, while the Hurricanes had won 14 straight. In the struggle between the proverbial unstoppable force and immovable object, host Florida State was installed as the favorite.

== The game ==
The game occurred before a record crowd of 63,442 at Doak Campbell Stadium. Miami received the ball first and went on an impressive 74-yard opening drive that featured a 30-yard run by running back Stephen McGuire and a critical third-down scramble by quarterback Gino Torretta. McGuire capped the drive with a 2-yard touchdown run to give the Hurricanes the early lead, 7-0. Florida State answered with a 51-yard completion from Weldon to Amp Lee, the longest play Miami's vaunted defense had allowed that season. The play set up a first-and-goal from the Miami 1-yard line. The Hurricane defense stiffened and, after a pair of penalties, Florida State was forced to settle for a 25-yard field goal from Gerry Thomas. The rest of the quarter showed missed opportunities on both sides, with Miami receivers dropping three deep passes from Torretta while Florida State's offense short-circuited with penalties.

Momentum swung to Florida State in the second quarter thanks to three Miami turnovers. The first came early when the Seminole defense recovered a fumble by McGuire at the Hurricane 24-yard line. After Weldon completed a pass to Edgar Bennett to bring the 'Noles down to the 5-yard line, the Hurricane defense again toughened, forcing a fourth-and-goal from the 1. Florida State opted to play smashmouth and backup fullback Paul Moore powered his way into the end zone to give Florida State a 10-7 lead. Miami drove inside the Florida State 30-yard line twice more in the quarter, but Torretta was intercepted each time, first by Terrell Buckley and later by Marvin Jones. Miami got the ball back when Weldon, under pressure from All-American Rusty Medearis (2 sacks for the game), was intercepted by Charles Pharms. The Hurricanes could not convert the turnover into points, as Carlos Huerta's 41-yard field goal attempt was blocked, preserving a 10-7 halftime lead for Florida State.

Florida State dominated the third quarter statistically, racking up huge advantages in yardage (158 to 38) and time of possession (10:04 to 4:56), but was mostly unable to convert that dominance into points. After briefly getting the wind knocked out of him by Miami linebacker Corwin Francis, Weldon led the 'Noles 58 yards in 13 plays on their first drive of the second half. Florida State drove down to the Miami 9-yard line, but the Miami defense hardened once again and the Seminoles settled for a 31-yard field goal for the only points of the quarter, pushing their lead to 13–7. Later in the third, Florida State embarked on a time-consuming 11-play, 90-yard drive that culminated early in the fourth quarter with Thomas' third field goal of the day, extending the Seminoles' lead to 16–7.

Miami answered with a 10-play, 44-yard drive that ended with a 45-yard field goal by Huerta. Florida State punted on its next possession and Miami took over trailing by 6 with 7 minutes remaining. On second-and-16, Torretta completed a 22-yard pass to an outstretched Coleman Bell, bringing the Hurricanes to the Seminole 41-yard line. A series of runs by McGuire, who finished with 142 yards rushing, brought Miami inside the red zone, but the Hurricanes soon faced a crucial fourth-and-6. Torretta found Horace Copeland for his only reception of the game, giving Miami a first down at the Florida State 3-yard line. The Florida State defense stopped Miami on first and second down, but backup fullback Larry Jones made the end zone on third down from 1 yard out to put the Hurricanes back in front, 17–16, with 3:01 left to play.

Florida State responded by promptly marching down to the Miami 46-yard line. There, Bennett bulled his way forward for 7 yards to convert a critical fourth-and-1. A pass interference call in the end zone against Miami's Ryan McNeil moved the Seminoles to the 18-yard line. On first down, Lee ran wide to the left side for 1 yard. Out of timeouts, Weldon spiked the ball on second down, bringing up third-and-9 with 29 seconds remaining. Weldon had lost his shoe on the previous play and Florida State head coach Bobby Bowden elected to have Thomas, who was 3-for-3 on the day, attempt a field goal one down early, reasoning, "An interception, a bounced ball and you lose the ball game. You'd kick yourself in the rear for the rest of your life." With both Miami's and Florida State's national championship aspirations riding on the outcome, Thomas came on to attempt a 34-yard, potential game-winning field goal.

Keith Jackson, broadcasting the game for ABC, made the call:

The snap...it's up...missed it to the right! Miami players are all over the field. They're going to get penalized for it, but "So what?" I'm sure is their attitude.

Prior to the 1991 season, the NCAA narrowed the width of the uprights by 4 feet 10 inches; Thomas' kick missed by the length of the football. Miami players threw their helmets in the air and rushed the field to celebrate, while Bowden, hands on hips, gazed at the goalposts, stunned.

After taking a knee to run off the remaining few seconds, Torretta tossed the ball skyward in triumph and Miami emerged from the contest with a 17–16 victory.

=== Scoring summary ===
Scoring Play	Score
1st Quarter
MIA – McGuire 2 run (Huerta kick)	MIA 7–0
FSU – Thomas 25 FG	MIA 7–3
2nd Quarter
FSU – Moore 1 run (Thomas kick)	FSU 10–7
3rd Quarter
FSU – Thomas 31 FG	FSU 13–7
4th Quarter
FSU – Thomas 20 FG	FSU 16–7
MIA – Huerta 45 FG	FSU 16–10
MIA – Jones 1 run (Huerta kick)	MIA 17–16

=== Statistics ===
Team Stats	Miami	Florida St.
First Downs	31	21
Total Offense	310	365
Rushes-Yards	43-165	40-137
Passing	145	228
Comp-Att-Int	14-27-2	18-27-1
Return Yards	41	53
Punts-Avg	4-41	5-38
Sacks Allowed	6	5
Fumbles-Lost	1-1	0-0
Penalties-Yards	8-81	6-61
Time of Possession	28:50	31:10

== Aftermath ==
After the game, Bowden expressed regret about not passing the ball on a third-and-goal from the Hurricane 4-yard line early in the fourth quarter and famously bemoaned his repeated misfortune at the hands of Miami, saying, "I think the curse is they're on our schedule. They're going to chisel on my tombstone, 'At least he played Miami.'"

With the win, Miami ascended to number one in the AP Poll and kept that ranking for the rest of the season. The Hurricanes won their final two regular season games and blanked No. 11 Nebraska 22–0 in the Orange Bowl, en route to their fourth national championship. Miami would share the national championship with the Washington Huskies, who finished first in the Coaches' Poll.

Florida State was upset in their final regular season game two weeks later by Florida, 14–9. The Seminoles would rebound to beat Texas A&M by a score matching their regular season record, 10–2, in the Cotton Bowl Classic, finishing ranked fourth in both the AP and Coaches' Polls.

== See also ==
- Florida State–Miami football rivalry
- Wide Right II
- Wide Right (Buffalo Bills) – (Super Bowl XXV) (January 27, 1991)
- 1991 Miami Hurricanes football team
- 1991 Florida State Seminoles football team
- List of nicknamed college football games and plays
