= Florida State–Miami football rivalry =

American college football rivalry

- Florida State Seminoles Miami Hurricanes
- Sport: Football
- First meeting: October 5, 1951; Miami, 35–13
- Latest meeting: October 17, 2026; Miami, 43–35^{2OT}
- Next meeting: 2027 in Tallahassee
- Stadiums: Doak Campbell Stadium (Florida State); Hard Rock Stadium (Miami)
- Trophy: Florida Cup

Statistics
- Total meetings: 71
- All-time series: Miami leads, 38–33
- Largest victory: Miami, 47–0 (1976); Florida State, 47–0 (1997)
- Longest win streak: Florida State, 7 (1963–1972, 2010–2016)
- Current win streak: Miami, 3 (2024–present)

Location of Florida State and Miami

The Florida State–Miami football rivalry is an American college football rivalry between the Florida State University Seminoles (FSU) and the University of Miami Hurricanes, both members of the Atlantic Coast Conference (ACC) and located in the state of Florida. Over the years, the rivalry has been fueled by geographical proximity, recruiting competition, and a history of high-stakes games. Since their first game on October 5, 1951, the two teams have played 71 times with Miami leading the series 38–33, as of the 2026 season.

== Notable games ==
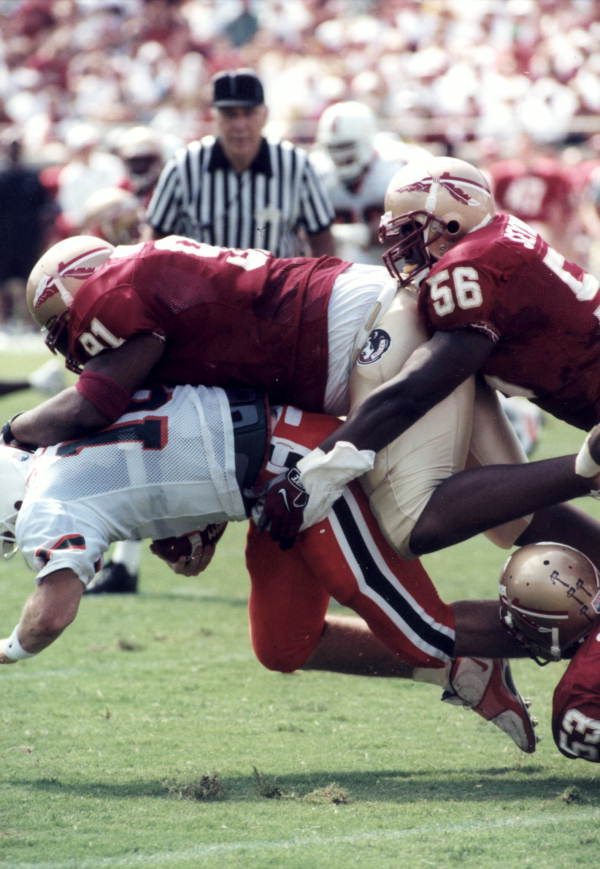
Miami and Florida State have played annually since 1963, comprising 63 consecutive head-to-head games as of 2026.

=== September 20, 1963: FSU shuts out George Mira-led Miami ===
Heading into the 1963 season, Miami quarterback and 1962 All-American George Mira was the cover story of Sports Illustrated's 1963 college football special edition. In that story, head coach Andy Gustafson said he put off his retirement to coach Mira.

During this season-opening matchup, the Seminoles stunned the Hurricanes, 24–0. FSU quarterback Steve Tensi completed 13 of his 20 passing attempts and threw for 149 yards. Receiver Fred Biletnikoff scored three touchdowns: two were catches from Tensi and one was the result of an 99-yard return off of an interception. Mira ended the game with 182 passing yards but was unable to generate any meaningful offense for Miami. This win marked the first of seven straight wins by the Seminoles and the first of two 7-game win streaks for FSU in the series. All of the Seminoles' wins during this streak came on the road at the Miami Orange Bowl.

=== October 3, 1987: Going for the win ===
During the 1987 regular season, Florida State and Miami's match up had national championship implications. Ranked 4th and 3rd in the country respectively, they featured a combined 60 future NFL players. FSU jumped out to a 19–3 lead. Miami rallied in the fourth quarter to take a 26–19 lead. FSU scored a touchdown with 42 seconds left. FSU could tie with the extra point, but Bowden decided to go for the win. The pass was broken up and the Seminoles lost 26–25 to the Hurricanes. Miami would go on to win the program's second national championship.

=== October 28, 1989: FSU Beats the National Champions ===
Florida State beat Miami 24–10 as Miami was missing their starting QB and was forced to play freshman Gino Toretta (Torretta later led Miami to a national championship in 1991 and won the Heisman Trophy in 1992). Miami went on to win the National Championship upon Craig Erickson's return. FSU did not compete for it, as they suffered two losses at the beginning of the season to a Brett Favre led Southern Miss and Clemson.

Prior to the game, University of Miami mascot Sebastian the Ibis was tackled by a group of police officers for attempting to put out Chief Osceola's flaming spear. Sebastian was wearing a fireman’s helmet and yellow raincoat and holding a fire extinguisher. When a police officer attempted to grab the fire extinguisher, the officer was sprayed in the chest. Sebastian was handcuffed by four officers but ultimately released. Torretta, who started the game in place of injured Craig Erickson, told ESPN, "Even if we weren't bad boys, it added to the mystique that, 'Man, look, even their mascot's getting arrested.'"

=== November 16, 1991: Wide Right I ===
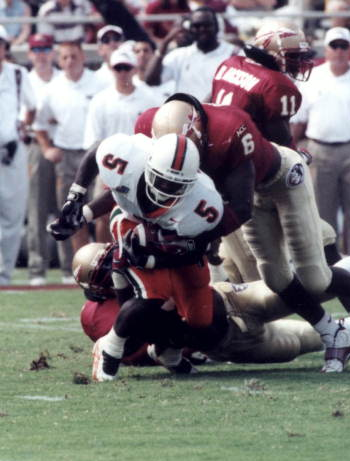
Miami and Florida State met as top ten opponents in seven consecutive games from 1987 to 1993.

After being called a "key persona" by Keith Jackson for hitting his third field goal of the game, Florida State kicker Gerry Thomas missed a field goal to the right with less than a minute left, and the top-ranked Seminoles lost in Tallahassee to the second-ranked Hurricanes, 17–16. Miami went on to split the national championship with Washington, and Florida State finished the season 11–2, ending it by winning the Cotton Bowl Classic against Texas A&M.

=== October 3, 1992: Wide Right II ===
Seminole placekicker Dan Mowrey missed a field goal to the right, and the 1992 Seminoles lost to the defending national champion Hurricanes in Miami, 19–16. Miami took an undefeated record to the Sugar Bowl, but lost the national championship to Alabama Crimson Tide. Florida State did not lose again, and finished the season ranked second, after Alabama, in both major polls.

=== October 7, 2000: Wide Right III ===
After trailing 17–0 at halftime, the Seminoles came back to take a 24–20 lead in the 4th quarter after a touchdown pass from 2000 Heisman Trophy winner Chris Weinke. Then, Miami took a 27–24 lead after a Ken Dorsey touchdown pass to Jeremy Shockey, but the Seminoles moved into field goal range during a last minute drive in Miami's Orange Bowl stadium. Florida State kicker Matt Munyon missed a field goal attempt again to the right to seal the Hurricanes' victory and end their 5 game losing streak against the Seminoles. Controversy erupted later in the season when the Seminoles were ranked higher by the BCS and picked to play in the Orange Bowl against Oklahoma for the national championship despite Miami being ranked higher in both the AP Poll and Coaches Poll. The Seminoles lost to the Sooners 13–2, while the Hurricanes defeated Florida 37–20 in the Sugar Bowl. Miami would finish #2 in the polls that year.

=== October 12, 2002: Wide Left I ===
The defending national champion Hurricanes staged a comeback against the underdog Seminoles to take a 28–27 lead with only minutes left in the game in Miami. The Seminoles drove down the field to give kicker Xavier Beitia a chance to win the game with a last second field goal and upset Miami. Beitia missed the kick to the left, giving Miami the victory by a narrow margin. FSU went on to win the Atlantic Coast Conference title with a 9–5 overall record, but lost in the Sugar Bowl to Georgia. Miami would finish the regular season undefeated and then lose in the national championship game, the 2003 Fiesta Bowl, to Ohio State.

=== January 1, 2004: Orange Bowl: Wide Right IV ===
This contest, a rematch of the regular season game won by Miami, took place in the 2004 Orange Bowl. In this contest, Beitia missed a field goal—wide right—that could have given the Seminoles the lead with about 5 minutes left. This game was of lesser importance on a national scale compared to the other Wide Right games, but continued the streak of Florida State losses determined by a single kick. With the win, Miami would finish #5 in the polls that year. It also marked the fourth loss in a streak that ultimately became the first time in NCAA History a Quarterback had lost 5 times to the same team, as FSU Quarterback Chris Rix had started and played in all 5 losses going between October 2001, and September 2004. This second win for Miami over Florida State that season made the Hurricanes the only team to ever beat the Seminoles twice in the same academic year. They are also the only team to beat the Seminoles in back-to-back games (this Orange Bowl was the final game of the season for both teams, who then opened against one another in Miami the following season). It was the only bowl meeting between the rivals, as Miami's move to the ACC the next season would make the schools intra-conference rivals and reduce the possibility of the teams ever meeting in a bowl game again.

=== September 5, 2005: The Miami Muff ===
Miami was ranked No. 9 and FSU No. 14 in what proved to be a defensive struggle. Trailing 10–7, and with one last chance to tie the score to extend it into overtime, the Hurricanes drove down the field to set up a game-tying field goal with 2:16 left. When the ball was snapped, it was mishandled by holder Brian Monroe and the ball never reached the kicker's foot. It would be the Hurricanes' turn to suffer a defeat at the hands of a kicking team mistake. The Seminoles kept the ball for remaining two minutes and finally ended their six-game losing streak against the Hurricanes and gained their first victory in the rivalry since 1999.

=== September 4, 2006: Last meetup at the Orange Bowl ===
Florida State played their season opener against the rival University of Miami Hurricanes on Labor Day for the third straight year. It was also the third time the team opened their Atlantic Coast Conference play with Miami. Much like the previous two Labor Day meetings, the 2006 edition of the game was a defensive struggle for both teams. The Seminoles trailed 10–3 at the half, but held Miami scoreless in the third and fourth quarters and took the lead with a 33-yard field goal late in the game. The 'Noles preserved the win when cornerback Michael Ray Garvin intercepted Miami quarterback Kyle Wright's pass with 29 seconds remaining. This would be the last meeting at the Miami Orange Bowl as the Hurricanes would move to Sun Life Stadium following the 2007 season. FSU would finish with a 15–16 record in 31 games against UM at the Orange Bowl stadium.

=== October 8, 2016: The Block at the Rock ===
Miami came into the game unbeaten and ranked 10th in the country, with a chance to move up in the top 10 after critical losses earlier in the day. Florida State came in ranked 23rd. The Hurricanes were looking to make a return to national prominence after recovering from the Nevin Shapiro scandal, in addition to snapping a six-game losing streak to Florida State. In the first half, Miami led 13–0 early. Florida State cut that lead to 13–3 with a field goal before the end of the 2nd quarter. Miami struggled out of the gate in the second half, as Hurricanes quarterback Brad Kaaya drove Miami down the field, but threw an interception in the end zone. Florida State scored on their next three possessions to take a 20–13 lead. Kaaya led the team down the field once again, and Miami scored on an 11-yard touchdown reception by Stacey Coley with 1:38 left. However, defensive end DeMarcus Walker blocked the extra point. Even though they were losing 20–19, Miami eschewed an onside kick attempt because they still had three timeouts left. After returning Miami's kickoff back to their own 13-yard line, Florida State was able to run out the clock by getting two first downs, and secured the one-point victory.

=== October 7, 2017: The Rally in Tally ===
Miami entered the October 7 match-up in Tallahassee undefeated at 3–0; FSU entered 1–2, with a loss to future National Champions Alabama, a close loss at NC State, and a win against Wake Forest. The Canes, who had not beaten FSU since 2009, entered halftime trailing by three. Behind heroics from senior wide receiver Braxton Berrios, who finished with eight receptions for 90 yards and two touchdowns, the Canes led the Seminoles 17–13 with only 5:09 remaining. FSU, led by true freshman backup quarterback, James Blackman, drove into Miami territory and scored what seemed to be the game-winner via a 20-yard touchdown reception from junior wide receiver Auden Tate with 1:24 remaining. Miami quarterback Malik Rosier, though, methodically drove the Canes downfield and lobbed a 23-yard touchdown to senior wide receiver Darrell Langham, who made a back-shoulder catch and lunged past the pylon with :06 remaining. The scoring play, following a five-minute review, stood. This game would end Miami's seven-year run of futility vs. FSU and against coach Jimbo Fisher.

=== October 6, 2018: The Comeback ===
Florida State came into the game as 14-point underdogs against Miami. After two TD passes to tight end receiver Keith Gavin and wide receiver Tammorrion Terry, with two field-goal kicks from the foot of Ricky Aguayo, the Seminoles finished the first half leading 20–7 over the Hurricanes. Florida State extended the lead in the 2nd half as wide receiver D.J. Matthews executed a 74-yard punt return for a touchdown, putting the Noles in front 27–7 over the Canes. Miami's defense then caused two turnovers followed up with two touchdown passes by freshman quarterback N'Kosi Perry to cut the score to 27–21. With 11:52 left in the 4th Quarter, Perry threw a pass to receiver Brevin Jordan for a touchdown, taking a 28–27 lead over FSU, erasing a 20-point deficit and claiming victory. This game would mark Miami's first win at home against Florida State since 2004, and the first time Miami has beaten Florida State in back-to-back years since the 2003 and 2004 seasons.

=== November 13, 2021: "4th and 14"/"The Van Dyke Spike" ===
The season was not spectacular for either team, with Florida State coming in 3–6 after starting 0–4 and Miami at 5–4 after starting the year ranked #14. Florida State was playing for bowl eligibility, while Miami was seeking to maintain a four-game win streak in the rivalry.

The Seminoles came out hot, scoring 14 points and forcing three turnovers in the first quarter before taking a 20–7 lead into halftime. Miami would storm back with 21 unanswered points, taking a 28–20 lead with 11 minutes left. After a lengthy drive that resulted in a field goal by the Seminoles and an excellent defensive stop led by defensive end Jermaine Johnson II, the Seminoles had the ball with 2:09 left in the game down 28–23. After a 59 yard pass caught by wide receiver Ja'Khi Douglas, the Florida State offense sputtered out to a 4th and 14 at the Miami 25 yard line. Florida State quarterback Jordan Travis would convert on a pass to wide receiver Andrew Parchment to the Miami 1 yard line before Travis would run it in himself on both a touchdown and the 2-point conversion to make it 31–28 with 26 seconds left. Miami's push to tie the game was stopped short when refs ruled the game over after an attempted spike by Miami QB Tyler Van Dyke with less than three seconds left, the minimum time needed according to NCAA rules. The Noles celebrated their first win over the Hurricanes in four seasons and maintained their quest for bowl eligibility.

=== October 17, 2026: The Robbery at the Rock ===
Entering their annual showdown at Hard Rock Stadium, #3 Miami was unbeaten at 5–0 and was widely considered to be a National Championship contender. Florida State, coming into the game at 3–3, was seen as a massive underdog. The results that followed became one of the most controversial and hotly debated games in the history of the Florida State–Miami rivalry.

Miami struck first to take a 7–0 lead, but Florida State quickly answered when quarterback Ashton Daniels found tight end Desirrio Riles for a touchdown. The rivals traded blows throughout the first half and went into the locker room deadlocked at 14–14.

The Seminoles seized momentum in the third quarter. An end-zone interception by Florida State defensive back Ashlynd Barker halted a Miami Scoring threat, and Daniels later connected with Quintreveon Wisner for a touchdown to give Florida State a 21–14 advantage. Miami responded in the fourth quarter with two touchdown drives, the second putting the Hurricanes ahead 28–21 with just 2:49 remaining.

With the game seemingly slipping away and the Seminoles facing a desperate situation, Daniels connected with senior receiver Duce Robinson on a 75-yard touchdown pass that tied the game at 28–28 and sent the rivalry into overtime. It was only the second time in the series' 71 game history that the game was decided in overtime.

The Controversial Ending; "Double Hail Mary"

Florida State struck first in overtime when Daniels once again found Robinson for a touchdown to take the lead. Miami immediately responded and tied up the game with a touchdown run by freshman running back Javian Mallory.

The game's defining moment came just moments later. In the second overtime, the Hurricanes took a 43–35 lead after Malachi Toney hauled in a touchdown reception and Miami successfully converted the required two-point attempt. Facing a daunting 4th and 21 play, Daniels connected with wide receiver Michai Danzy for what appeared to be a miraculous Hail Mary and potentially game tying touchdown. Celebration quickly turned to disbelief when officials threw a late flag for holding against Florida State offensive lineman Xavier Chaplin, wiping the touchdown off the board and moving the Seminoles back to 4th and 31. The penalty immediately sparked outrage amongst Florida State players, coaches, and fans, many of whom argued that the contact was a legal blocking move and did not warrant a game-altering call. Afterward, head coach Mike Norvell offered a pointed response when asked about the decision: "Go watch the film." Miami supporters steadfastly defended the call, however the overwhelming majority of prominent sport outlets and personalities rallied to the Seminoles' defense, further legitimizing their outrage.

Given one last chance, Daniels launched another Hail Mary pass into the end zone toward Robinson. Miami defensive back Bryce Fitzgerald and Robinson battled for possession, a dog pile commenced, and Fitzgerald came out of the wreckage with the ball, resulting in an interception being the official call on the field. After a replay review, officials upheld the interception, ending the game and securing a 43–35 Miami victory. Florida State supporters contended that Robinson had established possession first or, at minimum, that the play should have been ruled to be simultaneous possession, which would have awarded the catch to the offense under NCAA rules. In the official review at ACC headquarters, simultaneous possession was not discussed, further enraging Seminole supporters, and effectively ending the game.

The two disputed rulings ultimately overshadowed what had otherwise been a remarkable Florida State performance. Instead of being remembered for pushing an undefeated rival and top three team to the brink on the road, the Seminoles left Miami feeling that the game had been decided by officiating rather than the players on the field.

The loss dropped Florida State to 3–4 and added another painful chapter to a rivalry already filled with memorable finishes. Miami improved to 6–0 and escaped with its third consecutive victory over the Seminoles. With a potentially historic Florida State upset taken away in the final moments, the game became known simply as "The Robbery at the Rock."

== Accomplishments ==
Team	Florida State	Miami
National titles	3	5
Bowl appearances	49	42
Playoff appearances	1	1
Postseason record	29–18–3	19–23
Division titles	6	1
Conference titles	19	9
Consensus All-Americans	46	36
Heisman Trophies	3	2
College Football Hall of Famers	10	14
Pro Football Hall of Famers	5	9
First Round Draft Picks	47	71
All-time program record	588–298–17	619–353–12
All-time win percentage	.661	.635

== Game results ==
Florida State victories	Miami victories

No.	Date	Location	Winning team		Losing team	
1	October 5, 1951	Miami	Miami	35	Florida State	13
2	September 25, 1953	Miami	Miami	27	Florida State	0
3	September 30, 1955	Miami	Miami	34	Florida State	0
4	November 2, 1956	Miami	Miami	20	Florida State	7
5	November 8, 1957	Tallahassee	Miami	40	Florida State	13
6	November 7, 1958	Miami	Florida State	17	Miami	7
7	October 3, 1959	Tallahassee	#9 Miami	7	Florida State	6
8	November 4, 1960	Miami	Miami	25	Florida State	7
9	October 5, 1962	Miami	#9 Miami	7	Florida State	6
10	September 20, 1963	Miami	Florida State	24	Miami	0
11	September 19, 1964	Miami	Florida State	14	Miami	0
12	September 24, 1966	Miami	Florida State	23	Miami	20
13	September 26, 1969	Miami	Florida State	16	Miami	14
14	October 30, 1970	Miami	Florida State	27	Miami	3
15	September 18, 1971	Miami	Florida State	20	Miami	17
16	September 16, 1972	Miami	#20 Florida State	37	Miami	14
17	September 29, 1973	Tallahassee	#18 Miami	14	Florida State	10
18	November 8, 1974	Miami	Florida State	34	Miami	8
19	November 15, 1975	Tallahassee	Miami	24	Florida State	22
20	September 19, 1976	Miami	Miami	47	Florida State	0
21	September 24, 1977	Tallahassee	Miami	23	Florida State	17
22	September 23, 1978	Miami	#13 Florida State	31	Miami	21
23	September 22, 1979	Tallahassee	#14 Florida State	40	Miami	23
24	September 27, 1980	Miami	Miami	10	#9 Florida State	9
25	November 28, 1981	Tallahassee	#13 Miami	27	#14 Florida State	19
26	October 30, 1982	Miami	#14 Florida State	24	#16 Miami	7
27	November 12, 1983	Tallahassee	#6 Miami	17	Florida State	16
28	September 22, 1984	Miami	#15 Florida State	38	#4 Miami	3
29	November 2, 1985	Tallahassee	#11 Miami	35	#10 Florida State	27
30	October 1, 1986	Miami	#1 Miami	41	#20 Florida State	23
31	October 3, 1987	Tallahassee	#3 Miami	26	#4 Florida State	25
32	September 3, 1988	Miami	#6 Miami	31	#1 Florida State	0
33	October 28, 1989	Tallahassee	#9 Florida State	24	#2 Miami	10
34	October 6, 1990	Miami	#9 Miami	31	#2 Florida State	22
35	November 16, 1991	Tallahassee	#2 Miami	17	#1 Florida State	16
36	October 3, 1992	Miami	#2 Miami	19	#3 Florida State	16

No.	Date	Location	Winning team		Losing team	
37	October 9, 1993	Tallahassee	#1 Florida State	28	#3 Miami	10
38	October 8, 1994	Miami	#13 Miami	34	#3 Florida State	20
39	October 7, 1995	Tallahassee	#1 Florida State	41	Miami	17
40	October 12, 1996	Miami	#3 Florida State	34	#6 Miami	16
41	October 4, 1997	Tallahassee	#4 Florida State	47	Miami	0
42	October 10, 1998	Miami	#8 Florida State	26	Miami	14
43	October 9, 1999	Tallahassee	#1 Florida State	31	#19 Miami	21
44	October 7, 2000	Miami	#7 Miami	27	#1 Florida State	24
45	October 13, 2001	Tallahassee	#2 Miami	49	#14 Florida State	27
46	October 12, 2002	Miami	#1 Miami	28	#9 Florida State	27
47	October 11, 2003	Tallahassee	#2 Miami	22	#5 Florida State	14
48	January 1, 2004	Miami Gardens	#10 Miami	16	#9 Florida State	14
49	September 10, 2004	Miami	#5 Miami	16	#4 Florida State	10^{OT}
50	September 5, 2005	Tallahassee	#14 Florida State	10	#9 Miami	7
51	September 4, 2006	Miami	#11 Florida State	13	#12 Miami	10
52	October 20, 2007	Tallahassee	Miami	37	Florida State	29
53	October 8, 2008	Miami Gardens	Florida State	41	Miami	39
54	September 7, 2009	Tallahassee	Miami	38	#18 Florida State	34
55	October 9, 2010	Miami Gardens	#23 Florida State	45	#13 Miami	17
56	November 12, 2011	Tallahassee	Florida State	23	Miami	19
57	October 20, 2012	Miami Gardens	#12 Florida State	33	Miami	20
58	November 2, 2013	Tallahassee	#3 Florida State	41	#7 Miami	14
59	November 15, 2014	Miami Gardens	#2 Florida State	30	Miami	26
60	October 10, 2015	Tallahassee	#12 Florida State	29	Miami	24
61	October 8, 2016	Miami Gardens	#23 Florida State	20	#10 Miami	19
62	October 7, 2017	Tallahassee	#13 Miami	24	Florida State	20
63	October 6, 2018	Miami Gardens	#17 Miami	28	Florida State	27
64	November 2, 2019	Tallahassee	Miami	27	Florida State	10
65	September 26, 2020	Miami Gardens	#12 Miami	52	Florida State	10
66	November 13, 2021	Tallahassee	Florida State	31	Miami	28
67	November 5, 2022	Miami Gardens	Florida State	45	Miami	3
68	November 11, 2023	Tallahassee	#4 Florida State	27	Miami	20
69	October 26, 2024	Miami Gardens	#6 Miami	36	Florida State	14
70	October 4, 2025	Tallahassee	#3 Miami	28	#18 Florida State	22
71	October 17, 2026	Miami Gardens	#3 Miami	43	Florida State	35^{2OT}
Series: Miami leads 38–33

=== Top-5 games ===
Since 1936, when the AP Poll began being released continuously, the Hurricanes and Seminoles have met 6 times when both have been ranked in the top 5. The first instance came in 1987, with the most recent in 2004. Miami holds a 5–1 record in these top-5 meetings. The 1991 game was the only time the teams were the top two in the rankings.

Year	Away team		Home team		Notes
1987	No. 3 Miami	26	No. 4 Florida State	25	
1991	No. 2 Miami	17	No. 1 Florida State	16	
1992	No. 3 Florida State	16	No. 2 Miami	19	
1993	No. 3 Miami	10	No. 1 Florida State	28	
2003	No. 2 Miami	22	No. 5 Florida State	14	
2004	No. 4 Florida State	10	No. 5 Miami	16	

== See also ==
- List of NCAA college football rivalry games
