= 1992 Iowa State Cyclones football team =

American college football season

1992 Iowa State Cyclones football
- Conference: Big Eight Conference
- Record: 4–7 (2–5 Big 8)
- Head coach: Jim Walden (6th season)
- Defensive coordinator: Robin Ross (6th season)
- Home stadium: Cyclone Stadium

1992 Big Eight Conference football standings
| | Conf. | | | | | Overall |
| Team | W | | L | | T | W | | L | | T |
|---|---|---|---|---|---|---|---|---|---|---|
| No. 14 Nebraska $ | 6 | – | 1 | – | 0 | 9 | – | 3 | – | 0 |
| No. 13 Colorado % | 5 | – | 1 | – | 1 | 9 | – | 2 | – | 1 |
| No. 22 Kansas | 4 | – | 3 | – | 0 | 8 | – | 4 | – | 0 |
| Oklahoma | 3 | – | 2 | – | 2 | 5 | – | 4 | – | 2 |
| Oklahoma State | 2 | – | 4 | – | 1 | 3 | – | 7 | – | 1 |
| Kansas State | 2 | – | 5 | – | 0 | 5 | – | 6 | – | 0 |
| Iowa State | 2 | – | 5 | – | 0 | 4 | – | 7 | – | 0 |
| Missouri | 2 | – | 5 | – | 0 | 3 | – | 8 | – | 0 |
$ – Bowl Coalition representative as champion % – Bowl Coalition at-large representative; Rankings from AP Poll

The 1992 Iowa State Cyclones football team represented Iowa State University as a member of the Big Eight Conference during the 1992 NCAA Division I-A football season. Led by sixth-year head coach Jim Walden, the Cyclones compiled an overall record of 4–7 with a mark of 2–5 in conference play, placing in a three-way tie for sixth at the bottom of the Big 8 standings. Iowa State played home games at Cyclone Stadium in Ames, Iowa.

== Schedule ==
| Date | Time | Opponent | Site | TV | Result | Attendance | Source |
|---|---|---|---|---|---|---|---|
| September 5 | 1:00 p.m. | Ohio* | Cyclone Stadium; Ames, IA | | W 35–9 | 32,127 | |
| September 12 | 11:30 a.m. | at Iowa* | Kinnick Stadium; Iowa City, IA (rivalry) | ESPN | L 7–21 | 70,397 | |
| September 19 | 1:00 p.m. | Tulane* | Cyclone Stadium; Ames, IA | | W 38–14 | 38,913 | |
| September 26 | 1:00 p.m. | No. 4 (I-AA) Northern Iowa* | Cyclone Stadium; Ames, IA | | L 10–27 | 40,646 | |
| October 3 | 1:30 p.m. | at No. 19 Oklahoma | Oklahoma Memorial Stadium; Norman, OK | PSN | L 3–17 | 65,622 | |
| October 17 | 1:00 p.m. | No. 25 Kansas^{†} | Cyclone Stadium; Ames, IA | | L 47–50 | 38,331 | |
| October 24 | 2:00 p.m. | at Oklahoma State | Lewis Field; Stillwater, OK | | L 21–27 | 31,880 | |
| October 31 | 1:00 p.m. | Missouri | Cyclone Stadium; Ames, IA (rivalry) | | W 28–14 | 33,465 | |
| November 5 | 7:00 p.m. | at Kansas State | KSU Stadium; Manhattan, KS (rivalry) | ESPN | L 13–22 | 23,815 | |
| November 14 | 1:00 p.m. | No. 7 Nebraska | Cyclone Stadium; Ames, IA (rivalry) | | W 19–10 | 42,008 | |
| November 21 | 1:00 p.m. | at No. 11 Colorado | Folsom Field; Boulder, CO | KCNC | L 10–33 | 37,382 | |
*Non-conference game; ^{†}Homecoming; Rankings from AP Poll released prior to the game; All times are in Central time; Source:

== Game summaries ==
=== Nebraska ===
#7 Nebraska Cornhuskers (7–1) at Iowa State Cyclones (3–6)

| Quarter | 1 | 2 | 3 | 4 | Total |
|---|---|---|---|---|---|
| Nebraska | 3 | 7 | 0 | 0 | 10 |
| Iowa St | 3 | 9 | 0 | 7 | 19 |

at Cyclone Stadium, Ames, Iowa

- Date: November 14, 1992
- Game time: 1:00 p.m. CDT
- Game attendance: 42,008
- Box Score

External videos
- Marv Seiler run

| Team | Category | Player | Statistics |
|---|---|---|---|
| Nebraska | Passing | Tommie Frazier | 3/12, 54 Yds, TD |
| Nebraska | Rushing | Tommie Frazier | 13 Rush, 92 Yds |
| Nebraska | Receiving | Derek Brown | 1 Rec, 20 Yds |
| Iowa St | Passing | Marv Seiler | 3/4, 26 Yds |
| Iowa St | Rushing | Marv Seiler | 24 Rush, 144 Yds |
| Iowa St | Receiving | Sundiata Patterson | 2 Rec, 13 Yds |

Scoring summary

| Quarter | Time | Drive | | | Team | Scoring information | Score | |
| Quarter | Time | Plays | Yards | TOP | Team | Scoring information | NU | ISU |
|---|---|---|---|---|---|---|---|---|
| 1 | 9:46 | 11 | 60 | | Iowa St | 37-yard field goal by Ty Stewart | 0 | 3 |
| 1 | 5:17 | 9 | 56 | | Nebraska | 33-yard field goal by Byron Bennett | 3 | 3 |
| 2 | 14:23 | 12 | 66 | | Iowa St | 32-yard field goal by Ty Stewart | 3 | 6 |
| 2 | 11:49 | 7 | 80 | | Nebraska | Lance Lewis 15-yard touchdown reception from Tommie Frazier, Byron Bennett kick good | 10 | 6 |
| 2 | 5:49 | 13 | 46 | | Iowa St | 45-yard field goal by Ty Stewart | 10 | 9 |
| 2 | 1:38 | 7 | 27 | | Iowa St | 30-yard field goal by Ty Stewart | 10 | 12 |
| 4 | 10:50 | 2 | 80 | | Iowa St | Chris Ulrich 2-yard touchdown run, Ty Stewart kick good | 10 | 19 |
| "TOP" = time of possession. For other American football terms, see Glossary of American football. | | | | | | | 10 | 19 |

== Roster ==
1992 Iowa State Cyclones football team roster
Players
Coaches
Offense

| Pos. | # | Name | Class |
|---|---|---|---|
| C | 54 | Andy Alcorn | Sr |
| C | 78 | Scott Armburst | Sr |
| OT | 73 | Tony Booth | So |
| RB | 34 | Calvin Branch | Fr |
| WR | 85 | James Brooks | So |
| TE | 83 | Dan Dostal | So |
| RB | | Artis Garris |
| RB | 9 | Lamont Hill | Jr |
| WR | | Brandon Hughes |
| WB | | Jim Knott |
| G | 60 | Mark Konopka | Fr |
| OL | | Todd McClish |
| HB | 1 | James McMillion | Jr |
| RB | | Graston Norris |
| RB | | Sundiata Patterson |
| RB | | Angelo Provenza |
| RB | | Blaise Roberts |
| WR | | Matt Rouse |
| QB | 14 | Marv Seiler | RSr |
| OT | 62 | Dan Skartvedt | Jr |
| QB | 10 | Donnie Smith | Jr |
| WR | 89 | Chris Spencer | Sr |
| G | 52 | Jim Thompson | So |
| FB | 5 | Chris Ulrich | Jr |
| QB | 18 | Bob Utter | So |
| RB | 3 | Sherman Williams | Sr |

Defense

| Pos. | # | Name | Class |
|---|---|---|---|
| OLB | 49 | Marcus Allen | So |
| DB | | Andrew Buggs |
| LB | 46 | Jeff Cole | So |
| S | 25 | Mark DouBrava | Sr |
| DE | 97 | Shane Dunleavy | Sr |
| S | 36 | Kevin Fulton | So |
| ILB | 40 | Malcolm Goodwin | Sr |
| CB | 8 | Matt Goodwin | Sr |
| DT | 67 | Todd Miller | Jr |
| OLB | 58 | Dan Milner | Sr |
| DT | 70 | Troy Petersen | So |
| CB | 6 | Shawn Walker | Sr |
| DE | 41 | Dan Watkins | Sr |

Special teams

| Pos. | # | Name | Class |
|---|---|---|---|
| P | 19 | Jon Schnoor | Sr |
| K | 2 | Ty Stewart | So |

Head coach

- Jim Walden

Coordinators/assistant coaches

Legend

- (C) Team captain
- (S) Suspended
- (I) Ineligible
- Injured
- Redshirt

== Awards ==
Mark DouBrava

- 1st Team All-Big 12

James McMillion

- 1st Team All-Big 12
