= 1992 Oklahoma State Cowboys football team =

American college football season

1992 Oklahoma State Cowboys football
- Conference: Big Eight Conference
- Record: 4–6–1 (2–4–1 Big 8)
- Head coach: Pat Jones (9th season)
- Offensive coordinator: Bill Michael (1st season)
- Defensive coordinator: Bill Miller (4th season)
- Home stadium: Lewis Field

1992 Big Eight Conference football standings
	Conf.					Overall
Team	W		L		T	W		L		T
No. 14 Nebraska $	6	–	1	–	0	9	–	3	–	0
No. 13 Colorado %	5	–	1	–	1	9	–	2	–	1
No. 22 Kansas	4	–	3	–	0	8	–	4	–	0
Oklahoma	3	–	2	–	2	5	–	4	–	2
Oklahoma State	2	–	4	–	1	3	–	7	–	1
Kansas State	2	–	5	–	0	5	–	6	–	0
Iowa State	2	–	5	–	0	4	–	7	–	0
Missouri	2	–	5	–	0	3	–	8	–	0
$ – Bowl Coalition representative as champion % – Bowl Coalition at-large representative; Rankings from AP Poll

The 1992 Oklahoma State Cowboys football team represented Oklahoma State University as a member of the Big Eight Conference during the 1992 NCAA Division I-A football season. Led by ninth-year head coach Pat Jones, the Cowboys compiled an overall record of 4–6–1 with a mark of 2–4–1 in conference play, placing fifth in the Big 8. Oklahoma State played home games at Lewis Field in Stillwater, Oklahoma.

== Schedule ==
Date	Time	Opponent	Site	TV	Result	Attendance	Source
September 5	6:00 p.m.	Indiana State*	Lewis Field; Stillwater OK		W 35–3	34,068	
September 19	11:30 a.m.	at No. 6 Michigan*	Michigan Stadium; Ann Arbor, MI	ESPN	L 3–35	104,253	
September 26	6:00 p.m.	Tulsa*	Lewis Field; Stillwater, OK (rivalry)		W 24–19	47,280	
October 3	7:00 p.m.	at TCU*	Amon G. Carter Stadium; Fort Worth, TX		L 11–13	25,732	
October 10	1:00 p.m.	at No. 15 Nebraska	Memorial Stadium; Lincoln, NE		L 0–55	76,116	
October 17	2:00 p.m.	Missouri	Lewis Field; Stillwater, OK		W 28–26	30,115	
October 24	2:00 p.m.	Iowa State^{†}	Lewis Field; Stillwater, OK		W 27–21	31,880	
October 31	1:00 p.m.	at No. 18 Kansas	Memorial Stadium; Lawrence KS		L 18–26	31,500	
November 7	1:00 p.m.	at No. 16 Colorado	Folsom Field; Boulder, CO		L 0–28	51,559	
November 14	2:00 p.m.	Oklahoma	Lewis Field; Stillwater, OK (Bedlam Series)		T 15–15	50,440	
November 21	1:00 p.m.	at Kansas State	KSU Stadium; Manhattan KS		L 0–15	20,197	
*Non-conference game; ^{†}Homecoming; Rankings from AP Poll released prior to the game; All times are in Central time; Source:

== Personnel ==
=== Coaching staff ===
Name	Position	Seasons at Oklahoma State	Alma mater
Pat Jones	Head Coach	9	Arkansas (1968)
Bill Miller	Defensive coordinator/Defensive Line	4	
Mike Gundy	Quarterbacks	2	Oklahoma State (1990)
Keith Armstrong	Wide Receivers	3	

== Season statistics ==
Leading rusher: Rafael Denson – 99 attempts for 435 yards and 2 touchdowns. He was also the second leading receiver with 22 receptions for 303 yards and 3 touchdowns. Leading receiver: Shannon Culver – 41 receptions for 629 yards and 4 touchdowns. Leading passer: Gary Porter – 96–188 (51.1%) for 1,280 yards, 7 touchdowns and 14 interceptions.

Team rushing: 438 carries for 1,169 yards and 6 touchdowns. Team receiving: 116 receptions for 1,542 yards and 10 touchdowns. Team passing: 116–231 (50.2%) for 1,542 yards and 10 touchdowns and 18 interceptions.
