= 1992 Missouri Tigers football team =

American college football season

1992 Missouri Tigers football
- Conference: Big Eight Conference
- Record: 3–8 (2–5 Big 8)
- Head coach: Bob Stull (4th season)
- Offensive coordinator: Dirk Koetter (4th season)
- Defensive coordinator: Don Lindsey (1st season)
- Home stadium: Faurot Field

1992 Big Eight Conference football standings
	Conf.					Overall
Team	W		L		T	W		L		T
No. 14 Nebraska $	6	–	1	–	0	9	–	3	–	0
No. 13 Colorado %	5	–	1	–	1	9	–	2	–	1
No. 22 Kansas	4	–	3	–	0	8	–	4	–	0
Oklahoma	3	–	2	–	2	5	–	4	–	2
Oklahoma State	2	–	4	–	1	4	–	6	–	1
Kansas State	2	–	5	–	0	5	–	6	–	0
Iowa State	2	–	5	–	0	4	–	7	–	0
Missouri	2	–	5	–	0	3	–	8	–	0
$ – Bowl Coalition representative as champion % – Bowl Coalition at-large representative; Rankings from AP Poll

The 1992 Missouri Tigers football team represented the University of Missouri as a member of the Big Eight Conference during the 1992 NCAA Division I-A football season. Led by fourth year head coach Bob Stull, the Tigers compiled an overall record of 3–8 with a mark of 2–5 in conference play, placing in a three-way tie for sixth in the Big 8. Missouri played home games at Faurot Field in Columbia, Missouri.

== Schedule ==
Date	Time	Opponent	Site	TV	Result	Attendance	Source
September 12	2:30 pm	at Illinois*	Memorial Stadium; Champaign, IL (rivalry)	ABC	L 17–24	53,568	
September 19	1:00 pm	No. 7 Texas A&M*	Faurot Field; Columbia, MO	Prime Network	L 13–26	42,031	
September 26	11:30 am	at Indiana*	Memorial Stadium; Bloomington, IN	ESPN	L 10–20	40,907	
October 3	1:00 pm	No. 1 (I–AA) Marshall*	Faurot Field; Columbia, MO		W 44–21	39,644	
October 8	7:00 pm	No. 9 Colorado	Faurot Field; Columbia, MO	ESPN	L 0–6	37,183	
October 17	2:00 pm	at Oklahoma State	Lewis Field; Stillwater, OK		L 26–28	30,115	
October 24	1:00 pm	No. 8 Nebraska	Faurot Field; Columbia, MO (rivalry)		L 24–34	53,337	
October 31	1:00 pm	at Iowa State	Cyclone Stadium; Ames, IA (rivalry)		L 14–28	33,465	
November 7	1:30 pm	at Oklahoma	Oklahoma Memorial Stadium; Norman, OK (rivalry)		L 17–51	61,532	
November 14	1:00 pm	Kansas State	Faurot Field; Columbia, MO		W 27–14	37,093	
November 21	1:00 pm	No. 22 Kansas	Faurot Field; Columbia, MO (Border War)		W 22–17	30,845	
*Non-conference game; Rankings from AP Poll released prior to the game; Source:

== Roster ==
1992 Missouri Tigers football team roster
Players
Coaches
Offense

Pos.	#	Name	Class
WR	2	Victor Bailey	Sr
OT	75	John O’Neal	So
TE	89	A. J. Ofodile	So
RB	26	Ronnell Kayhill	Sr

Defense

Pos.	#	Name	Class
DE	59	Rick Lyle	Jr
LB	47	Mike Ringgenberg	Sr
LB	99	Chris Walls	Fr

Special teams

Pos.	#	Name	Class
K	3	Jeff Jacke	Sr

Head coach

- Bob Stull

Coordinators/assistant coaches

Legend

- (C) Team captain
- (S) Suspended
- (I) Ineligible
- Injured
- Redshirt

== Coaching staff ==
Name	Position	Seasons at Missouri	Alma mater
Bob Stull	Head coach	4	Kansas State (1968)
Dirk Koetter	Offensive coordinator	4	Idaho State (1981)
Mike Ward	Running backs	4	
Larry Hoefer	assistant head coach	4	McMurry (1973)
Marty Mornhinweg	Offensive line & tight ends	2	Montana (1985)
Kevin Faulkner	Tight ends	4	
Don Lindsey	Defensive coordinator	1	Arkansas–Monticello
Mo Lattimore	Defensive line	4	
Steve Telander	co-linebackers	4	
Ken Flajole	defensive backs	4	Pacific Lutheran (1977)

== Statistics ==
=== Passing ===
		Pass	Pass	Pass	Pass	Pass	Pass	Pass	Pass	Pass
Rank	Player	Comp	Att	Pct	Yds	Y/A	AY/A	TD	Int	Rate
1	Jeff Handy	196	329	59.6	2463	7.5	7.2	13	8	130.6
2	Phil Johnson	53	100	53.0	617	6.2	4.4	0	4	96.8
3	Brian Sallee	8	11	72.7	121	11.0	11.0	0	0	165.1
4	Jeff Jacke	1	1	100.0	22	22.0	22.0	0	0	284.8
5	Victor Bailey	0	1	0.0	0	0.0	0.0	0	0	0.0

=== Rushing and receiving ===
		Rush	Rush	Rush	Rush	Rece	Rece	Rece	Rece	Scri	Scri	Scri	Scri
Rank	Player	Att	Yds	Avg	TD	Rec	Yds	Avg	TD	Plays	Yds	Avg	TD
1	Joe Freeman	98	360	3.7	5	10	60	6.0	0	108	420	3.9	5
2	Ronnell Kayhill	94	328	3.5	3	41	395	9.6	2	135	723	5.4	5
3	Mark Jackson	52	150	2.9	1	3	24	8.0	0	55	174	3.2	1
4	Ryan Lyons	43	151	3.5	1	1	7	7.0	0	44	158	3.6	1
5	Jeff Handy	23	-72	-3.1	1	2	31	15.5	0	25	-41	1.6	1
6	Phil Johnson	19	11	0.6	0	1	26	26.0	0	20	37	1.9	0
7	Mike Schlef	15	35	2.3	0	2	9	4.5	0	17	44	2.6	0
8	Brian Sallee	8	50	6.3	0	13	125	9.6	0	21	175	8.3	0
9	Antwan Johnson	7	24	3.4	0	1	10	10.0	0	8	34	4.3	0
10	Bryan Murray	3	7	2.3	0					3	7	2.3	0
11	Kenny Holly	1	7	7.0	0	60	663	11.1	1	61	670	11.0	1
12	Ben Totta	1	1	1.0	0					1	1	1.0	0
13	Doug Hembrough	1	-1	-1.0	0					1	-1	-1.0	0
14	Kyle Pooler	1	-5	-5.0	0					1	-5	-5.0	0
15	Scott Villareal	1	-13	-13.0	0					1	-13	-13.0	0
16	Victor Bailey					75	1210	16.1	6	75	1210	16.1	6
17	A.J. Ofodile					17	244	14.4	2	17	244	14.4	2
18	Timothy Schlak					16	256	16.0	0	16	256	16.0	0
19	Kent Gardner					15	154	10.3	2	15	154	10.3	2
20	Frank Jones					1	8	8.0	0	1	8	8.0	0
