= Coca-Cola Classic (college football) =

Regular season National Collegiate Athletic Association college football game

Coca-Cola Classic (defunct)
- Stadium: Tokyo Dome (1988–1993)
- Location: Tokyo, Japan
- Previous stadiums: National Olympic Stadium (1980–1987); Korakuen Stadium (1977–1979)
- Operated: 1977–1993

Sponsors
- The Coca-Cola Company (1986–1993); Mitsubishi (1977–1985)

Former names
- Mirage Bowl (1977–1985)

The Coca-Cola Classic was a regular season National Collegiate Athletic Association (NCAA) college football game played in Tokyo, Japan, from 1977 to 1993. It was originally sponsored by Mitsubishi and known as the Mirage Bowl, and later sponsored by The Coca-Cola Company, renamed for the soft drink Coca-Cola Classic. Since the game was merely a re-location of a late regular season game, it was not considered a traditional postseason bowl game.

== Background ==
Japan universities began forming their own college football teams since 1934. In 1971, the Utah State Aggies became the first American college football team to play in Japan, in a series of games against teams of Japan's college all-stars. January 1976 saw the beginning of the Japan Bowl, a post-season college football all-star game played in Japan each January from 1976 to 1993.

In September 1976, Grambling State and Morgan State played a regular-season game at Korakuen Stadium in Tokyo, Japan. Won by Grambling State, 42–16, it was the first regular-season NCAA game played in Japan. Referred to as the "Pioneer Bowl" in some sources, the game was unrelated to the postseason Pioneer Bowl played in Wichita Falls, Texas, between 1971–1982, or the later Pioneer Bowl contested between historically black colleges and universities (HBCUs) between 1997–2012.

== Corporate sponsorship ==
=== Mitsubishi ===
The Mirage Bowl was hosted by Mitsubishi Motors in Japan from its inception through 1985. The name refers to Mitsubishi's Mirage line of subcompact cars. Chrysler imported the Mirage, and sold it in the US as the Dodge Colt and Plymouth Champ.

=== Coca-Cola Company ===
The Coca-Cola Company took over corporate sponsorship from Mitsubishi in 1986, renaming it the "Coca-Cola Classic". Other sports contests sponsored by Coca-Cola have also been called "Coca-Cola Classic"; for example, in college basketball and volleyball. The company's flagship beverage, itself, was re-branded "Coca-Cola Classic" in the wake of the "New Coke" fiasco.

== Game results ==
Season	Date	Winners		Runners-up		Venue	Attendance	Reference
1977	11 December 1977	Grambling	35	Temple	32	Korakuen Stadium	50,000	
1978	10 December 1978	Temple	28	Boston College	24	Korakuen Stadium	55,000	
1979	24 November 1979	Notre Dame	40	Miami (FL)	15	Korakuen Stadium	62,574	
1980	30 November 1980	No. 14 UCLA	34	Oregon State	3	National Olympic Stadium	80,000	
1981	28 November 1981	Air Force	21	San Diego State	16	National Olympic Stadium	60,000	
1982	27 November 1982	No. 10 Clemson	21	Wake Forest	17	National Olympic Stadium	80,000	
1983	26 November 1983	No. 6 SMU	34	Houston	12	National Olympic Stadium	70,000	
1984	17 November 1984	Army	45	Montana	31	National Olympic Stadium	60,000	
1985	30 November 1985	USC	20	Oregon	6	National Olympic Stadium	65,000	
1985	30 November 1986	Stanford	29	No. 12 Arizona	24	National Olympic Stadium	55,000	
1987	28 November 1987	California	17	Washington State	17	National Olympic Stadium	54,000	
1988	3 December 1988	No. 12 Oklahoma State	45	Texas Tech	42	Tokyo Dome	56,000	
1989	4 December 1989	Syracuse	24	Louisville	13	Tokyo Dome	50,000	
1990	1 December 1990	No. 11 Houston	62	Arizona State	45	Tokyo Dome	50,000	
1991	30 November 1991	No. 13 Clemson	33	Duke	21	Tokyo Dome	50,000	
1992	6 December 1992	No. 11 Nebraska	38	Kansas State	24	Tokyo Dome	50,000	
1993	5 December 1993	No. 10 Wisconsin	41	No. 25 Michigan State	20	Tokyo Dome	51,000	

== Notable games ==
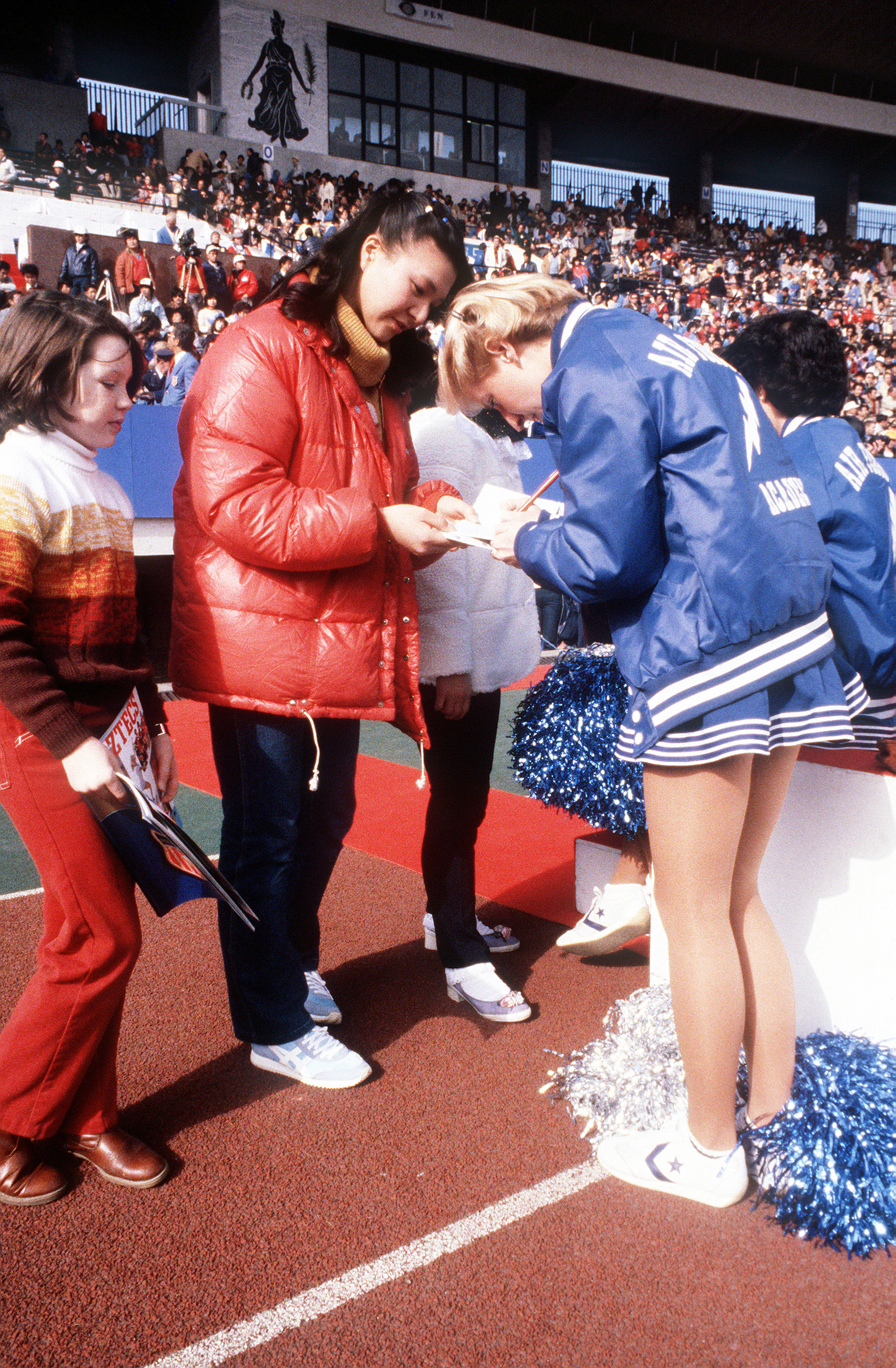
An Air Force cheerleader signing an autograph during the 1981 Mirage Bowl

=== 1977 ===
The inaugural Mirage Bowl was played in 1977 at Korakuen Stadium on December 11, between Grambling and Temple. Grambling rallied to win 35–32 with a last-minute touchdown, and All-American quarterback Doug Williams was named MVP.

=== 1984 ===
The eighth edition, between Army and Montana, marked the introduction of "The Wave" to Japan. A line of Army and Montana cheerleaders on the playing field demonstrated the concept of The Wave, and it was quickly adopted by spectators in the stands.

=== 1988 ===
Heisman Trophy winning running back Barry Sanders concluded his Division I-A (now FBS) record-setting rushing season in this game, since the NCAA did not begin counting bowl game statistics until 2002 (four weeks later, he gained 222 yards in the Holiday Bowl, which are not included in his record-setting total). He watched the Heisman Trophy announcement in a Tokyo television studio at five o'clock in the morning. Sanders rushed for more than 300 yards in Oklahoma State's 45–42 win against Texas Tech to finish the season with 2,628 yards.

=== 1990 ===
Houston quarterback David Klingler passed for 716 yards against Arizona State, a Division I-A (now FBS) single-game passing yardage record that stood for over two decades, broken by Connor Halliday in 2014.

=== 1992 ===
Nebraska won the Big Eight conference title, edging out runner-up Colorado with the win. It was the finale of Kansas State's last non-bowl season until 2004.

=== 1993 ===
With their 21-point win over Michigan State, Wisconsin became co-champions of the Big Ten (with Ohio State, who they had tied earlier in the season) and received the invitation to the Rose Bowl, the program's first New Year's Day appearance in 31 years.

== See also ==
- List of college bowl games
- List of college football games played outside the United States
