= 1992 Colorado Buffaloes football team =

American college football season

1992 Colorado Buffaloes football

Fiesta Bowl, L 22–26 vs. Syracuse
- Conference: Big Eight Conference

Ranking
- Coaches: No. 13
- AP: No. 13
- Record: 9–2–1 (5–1–1 Big 8)
- Head coach: Bill McCartney (11th season)
- Offensive coordinator: Les Steckel (1st season)
- Offensive scheme: Single set back
- Defensive coordinator: Mike Hankwitz (5th season)
- Base defense: 3–4
- MVP: Greg Biekert
- Captains: Greg Biekert; Chad Brown; Jim Hansen
- Home stadium: Folsom Field

1992 Big Eight Conference football standings
	Conf.					Overall
Team	W		L		T	W		L		T
No. 14 Nebraska $	6	–	1	–	0	9	–	3	–	0
No. 13 Colorado %	5	–	1	–	1	9	–	2	–	1
No. 22 Kansas	4	–	3	–	0	8	–	4	–	0
Oklahoma	3	–	2	–	2	5	–	4	–	2
Oklahoma State	2	–	4	–	1	3	–	7	–	1
Kansas State	2	–	5	–	0	5	–	6	–	0
Iowa State	2	–	5	–	0	4	–	7	–	0
Missouri	2	–	5	–	0	3	–	8	–	0
$ – Bowl Coalition representative as champion % – Bowl Coalition at-large representative; Rankings from AP Poll

The 1992 Colorado Buffaloes football team represented the University of Colorado at Boulder as a member of the Big Eight Conference during the 1992 NCAA Division I FBS football season. Led by 11th-year year head coach Bill McCartney, the Buffaloes compiled an overall record of 9–2–1 in a mark of 5–1–1 in conference play, placing second in the Big 8. Colorado was invited to the Fiesta Bowl, where the Buffalos lost to Syracuse. The team was ranked No. 13 in the final AP poll and the final Coaches Poll. Colorado played home games at Folsom Field in Boulder, Colorado.

== Schedule ==
Date	Time	Opponent	Rank	Site	TV	Result	Attendance	Source
September 5	12:00 pm	Colorado State*	No. 12	Folsom Field; Boulder, CO (Rocky Mountain Showdown)	KCNC	W 37–17	52,164	
September 12	11:00 am	at Baylor*	No. 12	Floyd Casey Stadium; Waco, TX	KCNC	W 57–38	34,202	
September 19	5:00 pm	at Minnesota*	No. 11	Hubert H. Humphrey Metrodome; Minneapolis, MN		W 21–20	33,719	
September 26	1:30 pm	Iowa*	No. 10	Folsom Field; Boulder, CO	ABC	W 28–12	52,355	
October 8	6:00 pm	at Missouri	No. 9	Faurot Field; Columbia, MO	ESPN	W 6–0	37,183	
October 17	5:30 pm	Oklahoma	No. 7	Folsom Field; Boulder, CO	ESPN	T 24–24	52,454	
October 24	12:00 pm	Kansas State	No. 9	Folsom Field; Boulder, CO (rivalry)	KCNC	W 54–7	52,235	
October 31	2:00 pm	at No. 8 Nebraska	No. 8	Memorial Stadium; Lincoln, NE (rivalry)	ESPN	L 7–52	76,287	
November 7	12:00 pm	Oklahoma State^{†}	No. 16	Folsom Field; Boulder, CO	KCNC	W 28–0	51,559	
November 14	1:30 pm	at No. 20 Kansas	No. 13	Memorial Stadium; Lawrence, KS	ABC	W 25–18	43,000	
November 21	12:00 pm	Iowa State	No. 11	Folsom Field; Boulder, CO	KCNC	W 31–10	37,382	
January 1	2:30 pm	vs. No. 6 Syracuse*	No. 10	Sun Devil Stadium; Tempe, AZ (Fiesta Bowl)	NBC	L 22–26	70,224	
*Non-conference game; ^{†}Homecoming; Rankings from AP Poll released prior to the game; All times are in Mountain time; Source:

== Game summaries ==
=== Colorado State ===
	1	2	3	4	Total
Colorado St	0	10	7	0	17
Colorado	7	7	10	13	37

First meeting since 1989

- CU - Westbrook 48 pass from Stewart (Blottiaux kick)
- CU - Johnson 60 pass from Stewart (Blottiaux kick)
- CSU - Ivlow 67 run (Rantzau kick)
- CSU - Rantzau 36 FG
- CU - Blottiaux 20 FG
- CU - Fauria 17 pass from Stewart (Blottiaux kick)
- CSU - Ward 9 run (Rantzau kick)
- CU - Blottiaux 28 FG
- CU - Blottiaux 29 FG
- CU - Westbrook 6 pass from Stewart
- Rushing: CSU Ivlow 6–152; CU Warren 14–66
- Passing: CSU Hill 10–23–115; CU Stewart 21-36-1-409
- Receiving: CSU Primus 4-81; CU Westbrook 7–130

External videos
- Full game

=== At Baylor ===
	1	2	3	4	Total
Colorado	7	26	3	21	57
Baylor	3	7	14	14	38

- BU - Weir 28 FG
- CU - Fauria 7 pass from Stewart (Blottiaux kick)
- CU - Blottiaux 50 FG
- CU - Johnson 35 pass from Stewart (Blottiaux kick)
- CU - Safety, Joe grounding in end zone
- CU - Warren 1 run (Blottiaux kick)
- CU - Westbrook 52 pass from Stewart (Blottiaux kick)
- BU - Mims 80 pass from Joe (Weir kick)
- BU - Strait 5 runn (Weir kick)
- CU - Blottiaux 28 FG
- BU - Bonner 33 pass from Joe (Weir kick)
- CU - Warren 4 run (Blottiaux kick)
- CU - Warren 14 run (Blottiaux kick)
- BU - McFarland 46 interception return (Strait run)
- CU - Leomiti 39 pass from Tobin (Blottiaux kick)
- BU - Miller 30 pass from Joe (pass failed)
- Rushing: CU Warren 19–41, BU Mims 4–22
- Passing: CU Stewart 16–17–251, BU Joe 6–20–262
- Receiving: CU Westbrook 11–186, BU Miller 2-82

== Roster ==
1992 Colorado Buffaloes football team roster
Players
Coaches
Offense

Pos.	#	Name	Class
TE	88	Christian Fauria	So
QB		Vance Joseph	Jr
RB	19	Rashaan Salaam	Fr
QB	10	Kordell Stewart	So
C	64	Bryan Stoltenberg	Fr
WR	12	Michael Westbrook	So

Defense

Pos.	#	Name	Class
LB	19	Greg Biekert	Sr
CB	13	Ronnie Bradford	Sr
LB	34	Chad Brown	Sr

Special teams

Pos.	#	Name	Class
P	17	Mitch Berger	Jr

Head coach

- Bill McCartney

Coordinators/assistant coaches

Legend

- (C) Team captain
- (S) Suspended
- (I) Ineligible
- Injured
- Redshirt
