= Reggie Freeman (American football) =

American football player (born 1970)

No. 55
- Position: Linebacker

Personal information
- Born: May 8, 1970 (age 56); Clewiston, Florida, U.S.
- Listed height: 6 ft 1 in (1.85 m)
- Listed weight: 233 lb (106 kg)

Career information
- High school: Clewiston
- College: Florida State
- NFL draft: 1993: 2nd round, 53rd overall pick

Career history
- New Orleans Saints (1993); Jacksonville Jaguars (1995)*; Green Bay Packers (1996)*
- * Offseason or practice squad member only
- Stats at Pro Football Reference

Reginald Prince Freeman (born May 8, 1970) is an American former professional football player who was a linebacker in the National Football League (NFL). He played the 1993 NFL season with the New Orleans Saints.

After playing college football for the Florida State Seminoles, Freeman was selected in the second round, 53rd overall, of the 1993 NFL draft by the Saints, which “was a reach to some.”

He was signed by the Green Bay Packers in 1996, but never played for them.
