= 1992 Nebraska Cornhuskers football team =

American college football season

1992 Nebraska Cornhuskers football

Big Eight champion

Orange Bowl, L 14–27 vs. Florida State
- Conference: Big Eight Conference

Ranking
- Coaches: No. 14
- AP: No. 14
- Record: 9–3 (6–1 Big 8)
- Head coach: Tom Osborne (20th season)
- Offensive scheme: I formation
- Defensive coordinator: Charlie McBride (12th season)
- Base defense: 3–4
- Home stadium: Memorial Stadium

1992 Big Eight Conference football standings
	Conf.					Overall
Team	W		L		T	W		L		T
No. 14 Nebraska $	6	–	1	–	0	9	–	3	–	0
No. 13 Colorado %	5	–	1	–	1	9	–	2	–	1
No. 22 Kansas	4	–	3	–	0	8	–	4	–	0
Oklahoma	3	–	2	–	2	5	–	4	–	2
Oklahoma State	2	–	4	–	1	3	–	7	–	1
Kansas State	2	–	5	–	0	5	–	6	–	0
Iowa State	2	–	5	–	0	4	–	7	–	0
Missouri	2	–	5	–	0	3	–	8	–	0
$ – Bowl Coalition representative as champion % – Bowl Coalition at-large representative; Rankings from AP Poll

The 1992 Nebraska Cornhuskers football team represented the University of Nebraska–Lincoln in the 1992 NCAA Division I-A football season. The team was coached by Tom Osborne and played their home games in Memorial Stadium in Lincoln, Nebraska.

== Schedule ==
Date	Time	Opponent	Rank	Site	TV	Result	Attendance	Source
September 5	1:00 pm	Utah*	No. 11	Memorial Stadium; Lincoln, NE	Prime	W 49–22	76,234	
September 12	1:00 pm	Middle Tennessee*	No. 11	Memorial Stadium; Lincoln, NE		W 48–7	76,184	
September 19	6:45 pm	at No. 2 Washington*	No. 12	Husky Stadium; Seattle, WA	ESPN	L 14–29	73,333	
September 26	1:00 pm	Arizona State*	No. 15	Memorial Stadium; Lincoln, NE		W 45–24	76,138	
October 10	1:00 pm	Oklahoma State	No. 15	Memorial Stadium; Lincoln, NE		W 55–0	76,116	
October 24	1:00 pm	at Missouri	No. 8	Faurot Field; Columbia, MO (rivalry)		W 34–24	53,337	
October 31	3:00 pm	No. 8 Colorado^{†}	No. 8	Memorial Stadium; Lincoln, NE (rivalry)	ESPN	W 52–7	76,287	
November 7	6:30 pm	No. 13 Kansas	No. 7	Memorial Stadium; Lincoln, NE (rivalry)	ESPN	W 49–7	76,165	
November 14	1:00 pm	at Iowa State	No. 7	Cyclone Stadium; Ames, IA (rivalry)		L 10–19	42,008	
November 27	12:30 pm	at Oklahoma	No. 12	Oklahoma Memorial Stadium; Norman, OK (rivalry)	ABC	W 33–9	69,770	
December 5	10:00 pm	vs. Kansas State	No. 11	Tokyo Dome; Bunkyō, Japan (Coca-Cola Classic, rivalry)		W 38–24	50,000	
January 1, 1993	7:00 pm	vs. No. 3 Florida State*	No. 11	Miami Orange Bowl; Miami, FL (Orange Bowl)	NBC	L 14–27	57,327	
*Non-conference game; ^{†}Homecoming; Rankings from AP Poll released prior to the game; All times are in Central time; Source:

== Rankings ==
Ranking movements Legend: ██ Increase in ranking ██ Decrease in ranking
	Week																
Poll	Pre	1	2	3	4	5	6	7	8	9	10	11	12	13	14	15	Final
AP	11	11	11	12	15	15	14	11	8	8	7	7	12	12	11	11	14
Coaches																	14

== Game summaries ==
=== Utah ===
Utah at Nebraska [box score]

Team	1	2	3	4	Total
Utah	0	0	14	8	22
• Nebraska	21	14	7	7	49

- Date: September 5
- Location: Memorial Stadium, Lincoln, Nebraska
- Game attendance: 76,234

=== Middle Tennessee State ===
Middle Tennessee State at Nebraska [box score]

Team	1	2	3	4	Total
Middle Tennessee State	0	7	0	0	7
• Nebraska	7	7	20	14	48

- Date: September 12
- Location: Memorial Stadium, Lincoln, Nebraska
- Game attendance: 76,184

=== Washington ===
Nebraska at Washington [box score]

Team	1	2	3	4	Total
Nebraska	0	7	7	0	14
• Washington	2	21	3	3	29

- Date: September 19
- Location: Husky Stadium, Seattle
- Game attendance: 73,333

=== Arizona State ===
Arizona State at Nebraska [box score]

Team	1	2	3	4	Total
Arizona State	0	10	14	0	24
• Nebraska	10	14	14	7	45

- Date: September 26
- Location: Memorial Stadium, Lincoln, Nebraska
- Game attendance: 76,138

=== Oklahoma State ===
Oklahoma State at Nebraska [box score]

Team	1	2	3	4	Total
Oklahoma State	0	0	0	0	0
• Nebraska	13	21	14	7	55

- Date: October 10
- Location: Memorial Stadium, Lincoln, Nebraska
- Game attendance: 76,116

=== Missouri ===
Nebraska at Missouri [box score]

Team	1	2	3	4	Total
• Nebraska	14	10	0	10	34
Missouri	0	14	7	3	24

- Date: October 24
- Location: Faurot Field, Columbia, Missouri
- Game attendance: 53,337

=== Colorado ===
Colorado at Nebraska [box score]

Team	1	2	3	4	Total
Colorado	0	7	0	0	7
• Nebraska	7	17	7	21	52

- Date: October 31
- Location: Memorial Stadium, Lincoln, Nebraska
- Game attendance: 76,287

=== Kansas ===
Kansas at Nebraska [box score]

Team	1	2	3	4	Total
Kansas	0	7	0	0	7
• Nebraska	7	28	14	0	49

- Date: November 7
- Location: Memorial Stadium, Lincoln, Nebraska
- Game attendance: 76,165

=== At Iowa State ===
#7 Nebraska Cornhuskers (7–1) at Iowa State Cyclones (3–6)

Quarter	1	2	3	4	Total
Nebraska	3	7	0	0	10
Iowa St	3	9	0	7	19

at Cyclone Stadium, Ames, Iowa

- Date: November 14, 1992
- Game time: 1:00 p.m. CDT
- Game attendance: 42,008
- Box Score

Team	Category	Player	Statistics
Nebraska	Passing	Tommie Frazier	3/12, 54 Yds, TD
Nebraska	Rushing	Tommie Frazier	13 Rush, 92 Yds
Nebraska	Receiving	Derek Brown	1 Rec, 20 Yds
Iowa St	Passing	Marv Seiler	3/4, 26 Yds
Iowa St	Rushing	Marv Seiler	24 Rush, 144 Yds
Iowa St	Receiving	Sundiata Patterson	2 Rec, 13 Yds

Scoring summary

Quarter	Time	Drive			Team	Scoring information	Score	
Quarter	Time	Plays	Yards	TOP	Team	Scoring information	NU	ISU
1	9:46	11	60		Iowa St	37-yard field goal by Ty Stewart	0	3
1	5:17	9	56		Nebraska	33-yard field goal by Byron Bennett	3	3
2	14:23	12	66		Iowa St	32-yard field goal by Ty Stewart	3	6
2	11:49	7	80		Nebraska	Lance Lewis 15-yard touchdown reception from Tommie Frazier, Byron Bennett kick good	10	6
2	5:49	13	46		Iowa St	45-yard field goal by Ty Stewart	10	9
2	1:38	7	27		Iowa St	30-yard field goal by Ty Stewart	10	12
4	10:50	2	80		Iowa St	Chris Ulrich 2-yard touchdown run, Ty Stewart kick good	10	19
"TOP" = time of possession. For other American football terms, see Glossary of American football.							10	19

=== Oklahoma ===
Nebraska at Oklahoma [box score]

Team	1	2	3	4	Total
• Nebraska	7	3	9	14	33
Oklahoma	3	6	0	0	9

- Date: November 27
- Location: Oklahoma Memorial Stadium, Norman, Oklahoma
- Game attendance: 69,770

=== Kansas State ===
Nebraska vs Kansas State [box score]

Team	1	2	3	4	Total
• Nebraska	14	7	10	7	38
Kansas State	0	10	0	14	24

- Date: December 5
- Location: Tokyo Dome, Bunkyō, Tokyo
- Game attendance: 50,000

=== Florida State ===
Florida State vs Nebraska [box score]

Team	1	2	3	4	Total
• Florida State	7	13	7	0	27
Nebraska	0	7	0	7	14

- Date: January 1
- Location: Miami Orange Bowl, Miami
- Game attendance: 57,327

== Personnel ==
=== Roster ===
1992 Nebraska Cornhuskers football team roster
Players
Coaches
Offense

Pos.	#	Name	Class
TE	81	Jacques Allen	Fr
TE	95	Gerald Armstrong	Jr
SE	80	Trumane Bell	Jr
QB	18	Brook Berringer	Fr
FB		Rick Blatny	So
IB	21	Derek Brown	Jr
OT	70	Mark Brown	Fr
OT	61	Brady Caskey	Jr
C	55	Terris Chorney	Sr
OT	73	Silas Cleveland	Jr
QB	10	Joel Cornwell	Sr
IB	17	Scott Davenport	Fr
SE	2	Corey Dixon	Jr
SE	28	Darin Duin	Sr
FB	37	Kyle Emsick	So
FB	28	David Fiala	Jr
IB		Jason Fisher	So
QB	15	Tommie Frazier	Fr
OT	59	Joel Gesky	So
TE	84	Mark Gilman	Fr
C	63	Aaron Graham	Fr
QB	1	Mike Grant	Sr
FB		Rod Haarberg	Jr
WB	38	Vincent Hawkins	Sr
TE	90	Erich Hohl	So
OL		Robert Hughes	Jr
SE	33	Tyrone Hughes	Sr
OT		Shyuan Jasper	So
OT	69	Dave Jensen	Sr
IB	44	Calvin Jones	So
FB	26	Lance Lewis	Sr
G	65	Jason Licht	Jr
OT	77	Lance Lundberg	Jr
IB	24	Jeff Makovicka	Fr
FB	7	Andre McDuffy	Sr
QB	9	John McMillen	Sr
G	62	Ken Mehlin	Jr
G	53	Wayne Meylan	Fr
WB	27	Abdul Muhammad	So
C	57	Brad Mundt	Sr
SE	94	Merritt Nelson	Fr
FB	35	Chris Norris	Fr
C		Don O'Neill	Jr
G	74	Steve Ott	Fr
C	53	Jon Pedersen	So
SE	39	Brett Popplewell	Fr
G	65	Bryan Pruitt	Fr
WB	82	Eric Schepers	Jr
FB	40	Cory Schlesinger	So
IB	23	Damon Schmadeke	Fr
WB	14	Darren Schmadeke	Fr
C	51	Jim Scott	Sr
WB	22	David Seizys	Jr
TE	85	Matt Shaw	So
G	75	Will Shields	Sr
G	78	Trent (T.J.) Slansky	Sr
OT		Robert Smith	Fr
G	66	Brenden Stai	So
FB	41	Chad Stanley	Fr
WB	36	Tom Steer	So
TE	88	Mike Vedral	Sr
QB	16	Tony Veland	Fr
G	58	Steve Volin	Fr
OT	68	Doug Waddell	Sr
TE	89	William Washington	Sr
WB	87	Tom Werner	Sr
OT	72	Zach Wiegert	So
SE	81	Duane Wiles	So
G	58	Joel Wilks	Jr
OT	56	Rob Zatechka	So
G	64	Chris Zyzda	Sr

Defense

Pos.	#	Name	Class
OLB	34	Trev Alberts	Jr
ILB	39	Leonard Alexander	So
CB	22	Marcus Anderson	Jr
ILB	48	Mike Anderson	Jr
MG	63	Ryan Barry	Jr
SS	23	Ernie Beler	Jr
OLB		Ken Bello	Fr
ILB	54	Troy Branch	Jr
CB	5	Lorenzo Brinkley	Jr
OLB	87	Clint Brown	So
FS	8	Tyrone Byrd	Sr
FS	31	Steve Carmer	Sr
SS	45	Zeke Cisco	Jr
DB		Anthony Cole	Jr
FS	17	Sedric Collins	So
ILB	46	Doug Colman	So
DT	99	Terry Connealy	So
OLB		Mike Dickmeyer	So
FS	4	Troy Dumas	So
ILB	41	Phil Ellis	Fr
OLB	39	Greg Fletcher	Jr
MG	94	Bart Furrow	Jr
OLB		Tory Garland	So
SS		Travis Giesbrecht	So
DB		Chris Grass	Sr
OLB	91	Lance Gray	Jr
FS		Charles Green	Fr
DT	58	Luther Hardin	Fr
OLB	86	Dwayne Harris	So
CB	25	Mike Heins	Jr
FS		Jay Herman	So
LB		Jon Hesse	Fr
OLB	36	Todd Heyne	Jr
OLB	85	Jerad Higman	Jr
OLB	93	Travis Hill	Sr
DT	74	Matt Hilman	Sr
MG	97	Bill Humphrey	So
MG	95	Jerry Irons	Jr
CB	37	Clester Johnson	Fr
OLB	84	Donta Jones	So
ILB		LeRoi Jones	So
OLB	42	David Leader	Sr
DT	70	Jamie Liewer	Sr
CB		Ralph Lott	Fr
DL		Dennis Martin	Fr
ILB	95	John Martin	So
CB	15	Brady Mercer	So
CB	14	Barron Miles	So
DT	90	Bruce Moore	Jr
CB	29	Kareem Moss	So
ILB		Ryan Murtaugh	So
MG	73	David Noonan	Jr
DB		Matt Orduna	Fr
DT	92	John Parrella	Sr
ILB	52	Aaron Penland	Fr
ILB	55	Matt Penland	Jr
DT	52	Jason Pesterfield	So
DT	66	Christian Peter	Fr
SS		Frank Phillips	Fr
ILB	35	Jim Prevette	Jr
DT	67	Kevin Ramaekers	Jr
CB	6	John Reece	Jr
OLB	24	Dean Schneider	Jr
ILB	28	Adam Schultze	So
FS		Jason Simdorn	So
CB		Jeff Solich	So
ILB	32	Ed Stewart	So
DT	83	Billy Wade	Jr
SS	43	Austin Wertz	Jr
FS	11	Jamie Weyers	Jr
OLB	96	David White	Sr
ILB	49	Paul Wightman	Sr
CB	19	Kenny Wilhite	Sr
ILB	98	Daren Williams	Jr
ROV	3	Toby Wright	Jr
FS	12	Chad Young	Fr

Special teams

Pos.	#	Name	Class
P/PK	13	Byron Bennett	Jr
P		Chris Borland	So
PK		Jeremy Jensen	Fr
P/PK	14	Jeff Lang	So
PK		Kevin McMindes	So
PK	12	Tom Sieler	So
P	47	Mike Stigge	Sr

Head coach

- Tom Osborne
  20th season
  29th year at Nebraska
  Alma mater: Nebraska

Coordinators/assistant coaches

- Charlie McBride
  12th season as DC/DL coach
  16th year at Nebraska
  Alma mater: Colorado
- Turner Gill
  1st season as QB coach
  1st year at Nebraska
  Alma mater: Nebraska
- Kevin Steele
  4th season as LB coach
  4th year at Nebraska
  Alma mater: Tennessee
- Ron Brown
  6th season as WR/TE coach
  6th year at Nebraska
  Alma mater: Brown
- Dan Young
  10th season as OL/K coach
  10th year at Nebraska
  Alma mater: Reed
- Milt Tenopir
  19th season as OL coach
  19th year at Nebraska
  Alma mater: Sterling
- Tony Samuel
  7th season as OLB coach
  7th year at Nebraska
  Alma mater: Nebraska
- George Darlington
  DB coach
  20th year at Nebraska
  Alma mater: Rutgers
- Frank Solich
  10th season as RB coach
  14th year at Nebraska
  Alma mater: Nebraska
- Boyd Epley
  24th season as S&C coach
  24th year at Nebraska
  Alma mater: Nebraska
- Bill Busch
  3rd year at Nebraska

Legend

- (C) Team captain
- (S) Suspended
- (I) Ineligible
- Injured
- Redshirt

Roster
Last update: January 17, 2011

=== Depth chart ===
FS
Tyrone Byrd
Troy Dumas
Sedric Collins

CB
Kenny Wilhite
Barron Miles
Mike Heins

OLB	ILB	ILB	OLB
Travis Hill	Ed Stewart	Mike Anderson	Trev Alberts
Donta Jones	Troy Branch	Darren Williams	David White
David Leader; Lance Gray	Matt Penland	Phil Ellis	Dwayne Harris

DT	MG	DT
John Parrella	David Noonan	Bruce Moore
Kevin Ramaekers	Terry Connealy	Jamie Liewer
Matt Hilman	Bill Humphrey	Billy Wade

SS
Steve Carmer
Toby Wright
Ernie Beler

CB
John Reece
Kareem Moss
Lorenzo Brinkley

Offensive Starters

LT	LG	C	RG	RT
Lance Lundberg	Ken Mehlin	Jim Scott	Will Shields	Zach Wiegert
Rob Zatechka	Chris Zyzda	Terris Chorney	Brenden Stai	Joel Gesky
Dave Jensen	Joel Wilks	Aaron Graham	T.J. Slansky	Brady Caskey

TE
Gerlad Armstrong
William Washington
Matt Shaw
Mike Vedral

SE
Corey Dixon
Trumane Bell
Tyrone Hughes

WB
Vincent Hawkins
Abdul Muhammad
David Seizys

QB
Tommie Frazier
Mike Grant
Tony Veland

FB
Lance Lewis
Andre McDuffy
Corey Schlesinger
David Fiala

IB
Calvin Jones
Derek Brown
Andre McDuffy
Jeff Makovicka

Special teams
Kicker Byron Bennett	Punter Mike Stigge	DS Aaron Graham	Holder

Kickoff cover unit

KR Tyrone Hughes Corey Dixon	PR Tyrone Hughes Corey Dixon

== Awards ==
Award	Name(s)
Outland Trophy	Will Shields
All-America 1st team	Travis Hill, Will Shields
All-America 2nd team	Trev Alberts, Calvin Jones, John Parrella
All-America 3rd team	Derek Brown, Tyrone Byrd, Mike Stigge
Big 8 Coach of the Year	Tom Osborne
Big 8 Offensive Player of the Year	Derek Brown, Calvin Jones
Big 8 Offensive Newcomer of the Year	Tommie Frazier
Big 8 Freshman of the Year	Tommie Frazier
All-Big 8 1st team	Trev Alberts, Derek Brown, Tyrone Byrd, Calvin Jones, Travis Hill, John Parrella, Jim Scott, Will Shields, William Washington, Zach Wiegert
All-Big 8 2nd team	Lance Lundberg, Mike Stigge
All-Big 8 honorable mention	Gerald Armstrong, Steve Carmer, Corey Dixon, Tommie Frazier, Tyrone Hughes, Lance Lewis, Ed Stewart, Kenny Wilhite

== NFL and pro players ==
The following Nebraska players who participated in the 1992 season later moved on to the next level and joined a professional or semi-pro team as draftees or free agents.

Name	Team
Trev Alberts	Indianapolis Colts
Mike Anderson	Amsterdam Admirals
Derek Brown	New Orleans Saints
Terris Chorney	Edmonton Eskimos
Doug Colman	New York Giants
Corey Dixon	Atlanta Falcons
Troy Dumas	Kansas City Chiefs
Tommie Frazier	Montreal Alouettes
Aaron Graham	Arizona Cardinals
Travis Hill	Cleveland Browns
Tyrone Hughes	New Orleans Saints
Calvin Jones	Los Angeles Raiders
Donta Jones	Pittsburgh Steelers
Barron Miles	Pittsburgh Steelers
Kareem Moss	BC Lions
John Parrella	Buffalo Bills
John Reece	Kansas City Chiefs
Cory Schlesinger	Detroit Lions
Will Shields	Kansas City Chiefs
Brenden Stai	Pittsburgh Steelers
Ed Stewart	Carolina Panthers
Tony Veland	Denver Broncos
David White	New England Patriots
Zach Wiegert	St. Louis Rams
Toby Wright	Los Angeles Rams
Rob Zatechka	New York Giants
