= Kansas State–Nebraska football rivalry =

American college football rivalry

- Kansas State Wildcats Nebraska Cornhuskers
- Sport: Football
- First meeting: October 14, 1911; Nebraska, 59–0
- Latest meeting: October 7, 2010; Nebraska, 48–13

Statistics
- Total meetings: 95
- All-time series: Nebraska leads, 78–15–2
- Largest victory: Nebraska, 59–0 (1911)
- Longest win streak: Nebraska, 29 (1969–1997)

Locations of Kansas State and Nebraska

The Kansas State–Nebraska football rivalry was an American college football rivalry between the Kansas State Wildcats and Nebraska Cornhuskers. The series was contested annually for nearly ninety years when the schools were conference opponents, but ended when Nebraska joined the Big Ten in 2011. Kansas State and Nebraska are separated by 135 miles, the nearest cross-border schools in both the Big Eight and Big 12.

== History ==
Kansas State and Nebraska first met in 1911, a 59–0 Cornhuskers victory at Nebraska Field that remains the most lopsided result in series history. Kansas State joined the Missouri Valley Intercollegiate Athletic Association (later the Big Eight) in 1913, but prior to the first meeting between the schools as conference opponents, KSU head coach Guy Lowman threatened a boycott due to the presence of lineman Clinton Ross, a black player, on Nebraska's roster. Lowman claimed a gentlemen's agreement throughout the conference disallowed black athletes; Nebraska denied such an agreement existed and the game was played as scheduled.

After a brief pause due to World War I and Nebraska's temporary departure from the MVIAA, the series was renewed in 1922 and played continually for the next eighty-nine years. The 1939 meeting was televised in Manhattan, the second televised college football game.

Nebraska always held the upper hand in the series, but took complete control after hiring Bob Devaney in 1962 – from 1960 through 1997, NU was 37–1 against KSU. In 1992, the teams met in the Coca-Cola Classic at the Tokyo Dome in Tokyo, Japan, where Nebraska defeated Kansas State 38–24 to clinch the Big Eight championship.

=== Big 12 era ===
In 1996, the Big Eight merged with four Texas schools of the Southwest to form the Big 12 Conference, with KSU and NU placed in the North Division alongside most former Big Eight schools. Devaney successor Tom Osborne retired in 1997 without ever losing to the Wildcats, but throughout the mid-1990s Bill Snyder was turning around KSU's long-struggling program.

The year after Osborne's retirement, KSU ended its twenty-nine-year losing streak to Nebraska in perhaps the most famous game in series history. The second-ranked Wildcats finished with 512 offensive yards in a 40–30 victory, widely remembered for a missed facemask penalty on fourth down of Nebraska's second-to-last drive. Snyder defeated Nebraska three more times before his first retirement in 2005.

In July 2010, Nebraska announced it would join the Big Ten Conference, essentially ending the school's rivalry with Kansas State. Months later, NU beat KSU 48–13 in Manhattan, the most recent game of the series. No future games are scheduled.

== Game results ==
Kansas State victories	Nebraska victories	Tie games

No.	Date	Location	Winner	Score
1	October 14, 1911	Lincoln	Nebraska	59–0
2	October 12, 1912	Lincoln	Nebraska	30–6
3	October 11, 1913	Lincoln	Nebraska	24–6
4	October 17, 1914	Manhattan	Nebraska	31–0
5	October 9, 1915	Lincoln	Nebraska	31–0
6	October 14, 1916	Lincoln	Nebraska	14–0
7	November 18, 1922	Lincoln	Nebraska	21–0
8	November 29, 1923	Lincoln	Nebraska	34–12
9	November 22, 1924	Manhattan	Nebraska	24–0
10	November 14, 1925	Manhattan	Tie	0–0
11	November 13, 1926	Lincoln	Nebraska	3–0
12	November 19, 1927	Manhattan	Nebraska	33–0
13	November 29, 1928	Lincoln	Nebraska	8–0
14	November 23, 1929	Manhattan	Nebraska	10–6
15	November 27, 1930	Lincoln	Kansas State	10–9
16	November 14, 1931	Manhattan	Nebraska	6–3
17	October 29, 1932	Lincoln	Nebraska	6–0
18	October 21, 1933	Manhattan	Nebraska	9–0
19	November 29, 1934	Lincoln	Kansas State	19–7
20	October 19, 1935	Manhattan	Tie	0–0
21	November 21, 1936	Lincoln	No. 13 Nebraska	40–0
22	November 27, 1937	Manhattan	No. 11 Nebraska	3–0
23	November 24, 1938	Lincoln	Nebraska	14–7
24	October 28, 1939	Manhattan	No. 10 Nebraska	25–9
25	November 30, 1940	Lincoln	No. 8 Nebraska	20–0
26	November 1, 1941	Manhattan	Kansas State	12–6
27	November 28, 1942	Lincoln	Kansas State	19–0
28	November 6, 1943	Manhattan	Nebraska	13–7
29	November 25, 1944	Lincoln	Nebraska	35–0
30	November 10, 1945	Manhattan	Nebraska	24–0
31	October 5, 1946	Lincoln	Nebraska	31–0
32	October 25, 1947	Manhattan	Nebraska	14–7
33	November 6, 1948	Lincoln	Nebraska	32–0
34	October 8, 1949	Manhattan	Nebraska	13–6
35	November 11, 1950	Lincoln	No. 16 Nebraska	49–21
36	October 6, 1951	Manhattan	Nebraska	1–0
37	October 11, 1952	Lincoln	Nebraska	27–14
38	October 3, 1953	Manhattan	Kansas State	27–0
39	October 9, 1954	Lincoln	Kansas State	7–3
40	October 1, 1955	Manhattan	Nebraska	16–0
41	October 13, 1956	Lincoln	Kansas State	10–7
42	October 5, 1957	Manhattan	Nebraska	14–7
43	October 11, 1958	Lincoln	Kansas State	23–6
44	November 21, 1959	Manhattan	Kansas State	29–14
45	October 8, 1960	Lincoln	Nebraska	17–7
46	October 7, 1961	Manhattan	Nebraska	24–0
47	October 20, 1962	Lincoln	Nebraska	26–6
48	October 19, 1963	Manhattan	Nebraska	28–6

No.	Date	Location	Winner	Score
49	October 17, 1964	Lincoln	No. 6 Nebraska	47–0
50	October 16, 1965	Manhattan	No. 2 Nebraska	41–0
51	October 15, 1966	Lincoln	No. 6 Nebraska	21–10
52	October 7, 1967	Manhattan	No. 7 Nebraska	16–14
53	November 9, 1968	Lincoln	Kansas State	12–0
54	November 15, 1969	Manhattan	No. 17 Nebraska	10–7
55	November 14, 1970	Lincoln	No. 4 Nebraska	51–13
56	November 13, 1971	Manhattan	No. 1 Nebraska	44–17
57	November 18, 1972	Lincoln	No. 5 Nebraska	59–7
58	November 17, 1973	Manhattan	No. 10 Nebraska	50–21
59	November 16, 1974	Lincoln	No. 6 Nebraska	35–7
60	November 8, 1975	Manhattan	No. 3 Nebraska	12–0
61	October 16, 1976	Lincoln	No. 3 Nebraska	51–0
62	October 8, 1977	Manhattan	No. 9 Nebraska	26–9
63	October 14, 1978	Lincoln	No. 8 Nebraska	48–14
64	November 10, 1979	Manhattan	No. 2 Nebraska	21–12
65	November 8, 1980	Lincoln	No. 5 Nebraska	55–8
66	October 17, 1981	Manhattan	No. 19 Nebraska	49–3
67	October 16, 1982	Lincoln	No. 6 Nebraska	42–13
68	October 29, 1983	Manhattan	No. 1 Nebraska	51–25
69	October 27, 1984	Lincoln	No. 4 Nebraska	62–14
70	November 2, 1985	Manhattan	No. 5 Nebraska	41–3
71	November 1, 1986	Lincoln	No. 9 Nebraska	38–0
72	October 24, 1987	Lincoln	No. 2 Nebraska	56–3
73	October 22, 1988	Manhattan	No. 5 Nebraska	48–3
74	October 7, 1989	Lincoln	No. 4 Nebraska	58–7
75	October 6, 1990	Manhattan	No. 8 Nebraska	45–8
76	October 19, 1991	Lincoln	No. 9 Nebraska	38–31
77	December 5, 1992	Tokyo	No. 11 Nebraska	38–24
78	October 16, 1993	Lincoln	No. 6 Nebraska	45–28
79	October 15, 1994	Manhattan	No. 2 Nebraska	17–6
80	October 21, 1995	Lincoln	No. 2 Nebraska	49–25
81	October 5, 1996	Manhattan	No. 7 Nebraska	39–3
82	October 4, 1997	Lincoln	No. 3 Nebraska	56–26
83	November 14, 1998	Manhattan	No. 2 Kansas State	40–30
84	November 13, 1999	Lincoln	No. 7 Nebraska	41–15
85	November 11, 2000	Manhattan	No. 16 Kansas State	29–28
86	November 10, 2001	Lincoln	No. 2 Nebraska	31–21
87	November 16, 2002	Manhattan	No. 11 Kansas State	49–13
88	November 15, 2003	Lincoln	Kansas State	38–9
89	October 23, 2004	Manhattan	Kansas State	45–21
90	November 12, 2005	Lincoln	Nebraska	27–25
91	October 14, 2006	Manhattan	No. 21 Nebraska	21–3
92	November 10, 2007	Lincoln	Nebraska	73–31
93	November 15, 2008	Manhattan	Nebraska	56–28
94	November 21, 2009	Lincoln	Nebraska	17–3
95	October 7, 2010	Manhattan	No. 7 Nebraska	48–13
Series: Nebraska leads 78–15–2

== See also ==
- List of NCAA college football rivalry games
