= 1993 Orange Bowl =

1993 Federal Express Orange Bowl
- 59th Orange Bowl
- The Miami Orange Bowl in Miami, Florida, hosted the Orange Bowl.
Florida State Seminoles	Nebraska Cornhuskers
(10-1)	(9-2)
ACC	Big Eight
27	14
Head coach: Bobby Bowden	Head coach: Tom Osborne
AP / Coaches / BC; 3 / 4 / 3	AP / Coaches / BC; 11 / 10 / 10
	1	2	3	4	Total
Florida State	7	13	7	0	27
Nebraska	0	7	0	7	14
- Date: January 1, 1993
- Season: 1992
- Stadium: Miami Orange Bowl
- Location: Miami, Florida
- Favorite: Florida State by 10 (50)
- Referee: Bill Goss (SEC)

United States TV coverage
- Network: NBC
- Announcers: Don Criqui, Bob Trumpy and John Dockery

The 1993 Orange Bowl was a college football bowl game played on January 1, 1993. This 59th edition to the Orange Bowl featured the Nebraska Cornhuskers, and the Florida State Seminoles. Nebraska came into the game ranked number 11 at 9–2. Florida State entered the game ranked number 3 at 10–1.

In the first quarter, FSU quarterback Charlie Ward found wide receiver Tamarick Vanover for a 25-yard touchdown pass and a 7–0 Seminole lead. FSU's placekicker Dan Mowerey nailed a 41-yard field goal in the second quarter to give Florida State a 10–0 lead. Florida State's Charlie Ward threw a second touchdown pass to give Florida State a 17–0 second quarter lead. Dan Mowerey added 1 24-yard field goal with 2:34 left in the half to give FSU a 20–0 lead.

Tommie Frazier threw a 41-yard touchdown pass to wide receiver Corey Dixon with just over a minute in the half to make the halftime score 20–7 FSU. Late in the third quarter, Florida State's Sean Jackson took a handoff, and rushed 11 yards for a touchdown giving FSU a 27–7 lead. Tommie Frazier threw a 1-yard touchdown pass to Gerald Armstrong in the fourth quarter to make the margin 27–14, but the Cornhuskers would get no closer. Florida State held on for a 27–14 win.

== Aftermath ==
Florida State finished the season number 2 in the nation, with an 11–1 record. Nebraska finished the season 9–3, and ranked in the Top 25 once again.

Florida State capped off this Orange Bowl with their 11th straight bowl game without a loss. They would go on and win their next three bowls in the following seasons. It would eventually mark 14 straight bowls (December 1982 through January 1996) without a loss. Speaking of that magic number 14, FSU went 14 straight seasons finishing in the final AP and or Coaches poll top four (1987–2000). That still to this day, marks the most consecutive seasons finishing in the final top 4 in the history of the AP (1936) and Coaches Poll (1950).
