= Coleman Bell =

American football player (born 1970)

No. 87
- Position: Tight end

Personal information
- Born: April 22, 1970 (age 56); Tampa, Florida, U.S.
- Listed height: 6 ft 2 in (1.88 m)
- Listed weight: 243 lb (110 kg)

Career information
- High school: Thomas Jefferson (Tampa)
- College: Miami (FL)
- NFL draft: 1993: undrafted

Career history
- Miami Dolphins (1993)*; Dallas Cowboys (1993–1994)*; Washington Redskins (1994–1995); Seattle Seahawks (1996)
- * Offseason or practice squad member only

Awards and highlights
- Super Bowl champion (XXVIII); National champion (1991); Second-team All-American (1992)
- Stats at Pro Football Reference

Coleman Bernard Bell, II (born April 22, 1970) is an American former professional football player who was a tight end in the National Football League (NFL) for the Washington Redskins in 1995. He played college football for the Miami Hurricanes. He won an NCAA national championship in 1991 with Miami.
