= Virginia Cavaliers football statistical leaders =

The Virginia Cavaliers football statistical leaders are individual statistical leaders of the Virginia Cavaliers football program in various categories, including passing, rushing, receiving, total offense, defensive stats, and kicking. Within those areas, the lists identify single-game, single-season, and career leaders. The Cavaliers represent the University of Virginia in the NCAA's Atlantic Coast Conference.

Although Virginia began competing in intercollegiate football in 1888, the school's official record book considers the "modern era" to have begun in 1946. Records from before this year are often incomplete and inconsistent, and they are generally not included in these lists.

These lists are dominated by more recent players for several reasons:

- Since 1946, seasons have increased from 10 games to 11 and then 12 games in length.
- The NCAA didn't allow freshmen to play varsity football until 1972 (with the exception of the World War II years), allowing players to have four-year careers.
- Bowl games only began counting toward single-season and career statistics in 2002. The Cavaliers have played in 6 bowl games since this decision, giving many recent players an extra game to accumulate statistics.

These lists are updated through the end of the 2025 season.

== Passing ==
=== Passing yards ===
Career
Rk	Player	Yards	Years
1	Brennan Armstrong	9,034	2018 2019 2020 2021 2022
2	Matt Schaub	7,502	2000 2001 2002 2003
3	Shawn Moore	6,629	1987 1988 1989 1990
4	Bryce Perkins	6,218	2018 2019
5	Kurt Benkert	5,759	2016 2017
6	Jameel Sewell	5,366	2006 2007 2009
7	Scott Gardner	5,218	1972 1973 1974 1975
8	Aaron Brooks	5,118	1995 1996 1997 1998
9	Marc Verica	4,992	2007 2008 2009 2010
10	Marques Hagans	4,877	2002 2003 2004 2005

Single season
Rk	Player	Yards	Year
1	Brennan Armstrong	4,449	2021
2	Bryce Perkins	3,538	2019
3	Kurt Benkert	3,207	2017
4	Chandler Morris	3,000	2025
5	Matt Schaub	2,976	2002
6	Matt Schaub	2,952	2003
7	Matt Johns	2,810	2015
8	Marc Verica	2,799	2010
9	Bryce Perkins	2,680	2018
10	Michael Rocco	2,671	2011

Single game
Rk	Player	Yards	Year	Opponent
1	Brennan Armstrong	554	2021	North Carolina
2	Brennan Armstrong	487	2021	Louisville
	Brennan Armstrong	487	2021	Pittsburgh
4	Kurt Benkert	421	2016	Central Michigan
5	Marc Verica	417	2010	Duke
6	Brennan Armstrong	407	2021	Wake Forest
7	Brennan Armstrong	405	2021	Illinois
8	Brennan Armstrong	400	2021	Virginia Tech
9	Brennan Armstrong	396	2021	Georgia Tech
10	Matt Schaub	393	2003	N.C State

=== Passing touchdowns ===
Career
Rk	Player	TDs	Years
1	Brennan Armstrong	58	2018 2019 2020 2021 2022
2	Matt Schaub	56	2000 2001 2002 2003
3	Shawn Moore	55	1987 1988 1989 1990
4	Bryce Perkins	47	2018 2019
5	Scott Gardner	33	1972 1973 1974 1975
	Aaron Brooks	33	1995 1996 1997 1998
7	Matt Johns	30	2013 2014 2015 2016
8	Mike Groh	29	1992 1993 1994 1995
9	Dan Ellis	28	1997 1998 1999 2000
10	Marques Hagans	27	2002 2003 2004 2005
	Michael Rocco	27	2010 2011 2012

Single season
Rk	Player	TDs	Year
1	Brennan Armstrong	31	2021
2	Matt Schaub	28	2002
3	Bryce Perkins	25	2018
4	Bryce Perkins	22	2019
5	Shawn Moore	21	1990
	Bobby Goodman	21	1992
	Kurt Benkert	21	2016
8	Aaron Brooks	20	1997
	Dan Ellis	20	1999
	Matt Johns	20	2015

Single game
Rk	Player	TDs	Year	Opponent
1	Dan Ellis	6	1999	Buffalo

== Rushing ==
=== Rushing yards ===
Career
Rk	Player	Yards	Years
1	Thomas Jones	3,998	1996 1997 1998 1999
2	Tiki Barber	3,389	1993 1994 1995 1996
3	Terry Kirby	3,348	1989 1990 1991 1992
4	John Papit	3,238	1947 1948 1949 1950
5	Kevin Parks	3,219	2011 2012 2013 2014
6	Wali Lundy	3,193	2002 2003 2004 2005
7	Tommy Vigorito	2,913	1977 1978 1979 1980
8	Frank Quayle	2,695	1966 1967 1968
9	Jim Bakhtiar	2,434	1955 1956 1957
10	Alvin Pearman	2,394	2001 2002 2003 2004

Single season
Rk	Player	Yards	Year
1	Thomas Jones	1,798	1999
2	Tiki Barber	1,397	1995
3	Tiki Barber	1,360	1996
4	Thomas Jones	1,303	1998
5	Barry Word	1,224	1985
6	John Papit	1,214	1949
7	Frank Quayle	1,213	1968
8	Terry Kirby	1,130	1992
9	Marcus Wilson	1,098	1989
10	J'Mari Taylor	1,062	2025

Single game
Rk	Player	Yards	Year	Opponent
1	John Papit	224	1948	Washington & Lee
2	Alvin Pearman	223	2004	Duke
3	Frank Quayle	221	1966	Maryland
	Thomas Jones	221	1999	NC State
	Thomas Jones	221	1999	Buffalo
6	Frank Quayle	216	1968	Maryland
7	Bill Dudley	215	1941	North Carolina
8	Terry Kirby	214	1992	Wake Forest
9	Thomas Jones	213	1999	Georgia Tech
10	John Papit	212	1949	West Virginia

=== Rushing touchdowns ===
Career
Rk	Player	TDs	Years
1	Gene Mayer	46	1912 1913 1914 1915
2	Wali Lundy	43	2002 2003 2004 2005
3	Thomas Jones	37	1996 1997 1998 1999
4	Tiki Barber	31	1993 1994 1995 1996
5	Kevin Parks	29	2011 2012 2013 2014
6	Frank Quayle	28	1966 1967 1968
7	Shawn Moore	28	1987 1988 1989 1990
8	Terry Kirby	24	1989 1990 1991 1992
9	Howard Petty	21	1983 1984 1985
10	Charles Way	20	1991 1992 1993 1994
	Bryce Perkins	20	2018 2019
	Brennan Armstrong	20	2018 2019 2020 2021 2022

Single season
Rk	Player	TDs	Year
1	Gene Mayer	18	1915
2	Wali Lundy	17	2004
3	Thomas Jones	16	1999
4	Tiki Barber	14	1995
	Tiki Barber	14	1996
	J'Mari Taylor	14	2025
7	Thomas Jones	13	1998
8	Wayne Tualapapa	12	2019
9	Kevin Parks	11	2013
	Bryce Perkins	11	2019

Single game
Rk	Player	TDs	Year	Opponent
1	Gene Mayer	5	1912	North Carolina
	Gene Mayer	5	1915	Richmond

== Receiving ==
=== Receptions ===
Career
Rk	Player	Rec	Years
1	Olamide Zaccheaus	250	2015 2016 2017 2018
2	Billy McMullen	210	1999 2000 2001 2002
3	Taquan Mizzell	195	2013 2014 2015 2016
4	Billy Kemp IV	192	2019 2020 2021 2022
5	Kris Burd	162	2008 2009 2010 2011
6	Hasise Dubois	151	2016 2017 2018 2019
7	Heath Miller	144	2002 2003 2004
8	Alvin Pearman	138	2001 2002 2003 2004
	Keytaon Thompson	138	2020 2021 2022
10	Darius Jennings	133	2011 2012 2013 2014

Single season
Rk	Player	Rec	Year
1	Malik Washington	110	2023
2	Billy McMullen	83	2001
3	Keytaon Thompson	78	2021
4	Joe Reed	77	2019
5	Taquan Mizzell	75	2015
	Hasise Dubois	75	2019
7	Terrell Jana	74	2019
	Billy Kemp IV	74	2021
9	Heath Miller	70	2003
10	Billy McMullen	69	2002

Single game
Rk	Player	Rec	Year	Opponent
1	Alvin Pearman	16	2003	Florida State
2	Malik Washington	14	2023	Virginia Tech
3	Alvin Pearman	13	2003	NC State
	Heath Miller	13	2003	Virginia Tech
	Mikell Simpson	13	2007	Maryland
	Darius Jennings	13	2013	Georgia Tech
	Terrell Jana	13	2019	North Carolina
8	Olamide Zaccheaus	12	2018	South Carolina
	Malik Washington	12	2023	North Carolina
	Malik Washington	12	2023	Miami (FL)

=== Receiving yards ===
Career
Rk	Player	Yards	Years
1	Billy McMullen	2,978	1999 2000 2001 2002
2	Olamide Zaccheaus	2,753	2015 2016 2017 2018
3	Herman Moore	2,504	1988 1989 1990
4	John Ford	2,399	1984 1986 1987 1988
5	Kris Burd	2,190	2008 2009 2010 2011
6	Tyrone Davis	2,153	1991 1992 1993 1994
7	Germane Crowell	2,142	1994 1995 1996 1997
8	Hasise Dubois	1,859	2016 2017 2018 2019
9	Malachi Fields	1,849	2021 2022 2023 2024
10	Patrick Jeffers	1,785	1992 1993 1994 1995

Single season
Rk	Player	Yards	Year
1	Malik Washington	1,426	2023
2	Dontayvion Wicks	1,203	2021
3	Herman Moore	1,190	1990
4	Hasise Dubois	1,062	2019
5	Billy McMullen	1,060	2001
6	Olamide Zaccheaus	1,058	2018
7	Keytaon Thompson	990	2021
8	Germane Crowell	969	1997
9	Kris Burd	913	2011
10	Olamide Zaccheaus	895	2017

Single game
Rk	Player	Yards	Year	Opponent
1	Olamide Zaccheaus	247	2018	Ohio
2	Ken Shelton	241	1974	William & Mary
3	Dontrelle Inman	239	2010	Duke
4	Herman Moore	234	1990	Georgia Tech
5	Billy McMullen	189	2000	Duke
6	Dontayvion Wicks	183	2021	North Carolina
7	Herman Moore	180	1990	Virginia Tech
8	Ra'Shaun Henry	179	2021	Louisville
9	Harrison Davis	178	1973	North Carolina
10	Herman Moore	175	1988	Virginia Tech
	Billy McMullen	175	2001	Maryland

=== Receiving touchdowns ===
Career
Rk	Player	TDs	Years
1	Tyrone Davis	28	1991 1992 1993 1994
2	Herman Moore	27	1988 1989 1990
3	Billy McMullen	24	1999 2000 2001 2002
4	Olamide Zaccheaus	22	2015 2016 2017 2018
5	John Ford	20	1984 1986 1987 1988
	Heath Miller	20	2002 2003 2004
7	Germane Crowell	19	1994 1995 1996 1997
8	Joe Reed	16	2016 2017 2018 2019
9	Patrick Jeffers	15	1992 1993 1994 1995
	Kevin Coffey	15	1997 1998 1999 2000

Single season
Rk	Player	TDs	Year
1	Herman Moore	13	1990
2	Billy McMullen	12	2001
3	Herman Moore	10	1989
	Tyrone Davis	10	1994
5	Germane Crowell	9	1997
	Heath Miller	9	2002
	Olamide Zaccheaus	9	2018
	Dontayvion Wicks	9	2021
	Malik Washington	9	2023
10	Canaan Severin	8	2015
	Jelani Woods	8	2021

Single game
Rk	Player	TDs	Year	Opponent
1	Ed Carrington	4	1965	Maryland

== Total offense ==
Total offense is the sum of passing and rushing statistics. It does not include receiving or returns.

=== Total offense yards ===
Career
Rk	Player	Yards	Years
1	Brennan Armstrong	10,301	2018 2019 2020 2021 2022
2	Bryce Perkins	7,910	2018 2019
3	Shawn Moore	7,897	1987 1988 1989 1990
4	Matt Schaub	7,560	2000 2001 2002 2003
5	Scott Gardner	6,059	1972 1973 1974 1975
6	Jameel Sewell	6,012	2006 2007 2009
7	Marques Hagans	5,779	2002 2003 2004 2005
8	Aaron Brooks	5,665	1995 1996 1997 1998
9	Kurt Benkert	5,602	2016 2017
10	Marc Verica	4,837	2007 2008 2009 2010

Single season
Rk	Player	Yards	Year
1	Brennan Armstrong	4,700	2021
2	Bryce Perkins	3,603	2018
3	Chandler Morris	3,245	2025
4	Kurt Benkert	3,144	2017
5	Matt Schaub	3,071	2002
6	Matt Schaub	2,929	2003
7	Matt Johns	2,896	2015
8	Marques Hagans	2,802	2005
9	Marc Verica	2,752	2010
10	Michael Rocco	2,691	2011

Single game
Rk	Player	Yards	Year	Opponent
1	Brennan Armstrong	538	2021	North Carolina
2	Brennan Armstrong	495	2021	Georgia Tech
3	Bryce Perkins	490	2019	North Carolina
4	Brennan Armstrong	464	2021	Louisville
5	Brennan Armstrong	460	2021	Pittsburgh
6	Brennan Armstrong	440	2021	Wake Forest
7	Brennan Armstrong	436	2021	Illinois
8	Brennan Armstrong	435	2020	Abilene Christian
9	Brennan Armstrong	431	2021	BYU
10	Kurt Benkert	423	2016	Central Michigan

=== Total touchdowns ===
Career
Rk	Player	TDs	Years
1	Shawn Moore	83	1987 1988 1989 1990
2	Brennan Armstrong	78	2018 2019 2020 2021 2022
3	Matt Schaub	61	2000 2001 2002 2003
4	Aaron Brooks	47	1995 1996 1997 1998
5	Scott Gardner	46	1972 1973 1974 1975
6	Wali Lundy	45	2002 2003 2004 2005
7	Jameel Sewell	39	2006 2007 2009
8	Marques Hagans	38	2002 2003 2004 2005
9	Thomas Jones	37	1996 1997 1998 1999
10	Mike Groh	36	1992 1993 1994 1995

Single season
Rk	Player	TDs	Year
1	Brennan Armstrong	40	2021
2	Bryce Perkins	34	2018
3	Matt Schaub	30	2002
4	Shawn Moore	29	1990

== Defense ==
=== Interceptions ===
Career
Rk	Player	Ints	Years
1	Keith McMeans	17	1987 1988 1989 1990
2	Pat Chester	16	1978 1979 1980 1981 1982
3	Ronde Barber	15	1994 1995 1996
	Marcus Hamilton	15	2002 2004 2005 2006
5	Kevin Cook	14	1986 1987 1988 1989
6	Chase Minnifield	13	2008 2009 2010 2011
	Juan Thornhill	13	2015 2016 2017 2018
8	Bryan Shumock	12	1977 1978 1979 1980
	Joe Crocker	12	1992 1993 1994 1995
	Anthony Poindexter	12	1995 1996 1997 1998

Single season
Rk	Player	Ints	Year
1	Keith McMeans	9	1987

Single game
Rk	Player	Ints	Year	Opponent
1	Eddie Bryant	3	1940	Maryland
	Reece Whitley	3	1957	North Carolina
	Pete Schmidt	3	1968	Davidson
	Mike Pettine	3	1986	NC State
	Keith McMeans	3	1987	NC State
	Anthony Poindexter	3	1996	NC State
	Rodney McLeod	3	2011	Maryland

=== Tackles ===
Career
Rk	Player	Tackles	Years
1	Quin Blanding	492	2014 2015 2016 2017
2	Jamie Sharper	435	1993 1994 1995 1996
3	Charles McDaniel	432	1982 1983 1984 1985
4	Angelo Crowell	420	1999 2000 2001 2002
5	Micah Kiser	408	2014 2015 2016 2017
6	Byron Thweatt	387	1997 1998 1999 2000
7	James Farrior	381	1993 1994 1995 1996
8	Steve Greer	376	2009 2010 2011 2012
9	Russ Swan	373	1982 1983 1984 1985
10	Randy Neal	367	1991 1992 1993 1994

Single season
Rk	Player	Tackles	Year
1	Angelo Crowell	155	2002
2	Angelo Crowell	144	2001
3	Micah Kiser	143	2017
4	Randy Neal	139	1993
5	Quin Blanding	136	2017
6	Wali Rainer	134	1985
	Micah Kiser	134	2016
8	Micah Kiser	133	2016
9	Charles McDaniel	130	1983
10	Yubrenal Isabelle	128	2000

Single game
Rk	Player	Tackles	Year	Opponent
1	Stuart Anderson	24	1979	NC State

=== Sacks ===
Career
Rk	Player	Sacks	Years
1	Chris Slade	40.0	1989 1990 1991 1992
2	Clint Sintim	29.0	2005 2006 2007
3	Darryl Blackstock	27.0	2002 2003 2004
4	Mike Frederick	26.0	1991 1992 1993 1994
5	Patrick Kerney	24.0	1995 1996 1997 1998
6	Stuart Anderson	23.0	1978 1979 1980 1981
	Duane Ashman	23.0	1993 1994 1995 1996
8	Chris Long	22.0	2004 2005 2006 2007
9	Sean Scott	21.0	1984 1985 1986 1987
10	Ron Mattes	18.0	1981 1982 1983 1984

Single season
Rk	Player	Sacks	Year
1	Chris Slade	15.0	1992
	Patrick Kerney	15.0	1998
3	Chris Slade	14.0	1991
	Chris Long	14.0	2007
5	Clint Sintim	13.0	2008
6	Mike Frederick	11.0	1993
	Darryl Blackstock	11.0	2004
8	Darryl Blackstock	10.0	2002

== Kicking ==
=== Field goals made ===
Career
Rk	Player	FGs	Years
1	Will Bettridge	67	2022 2023 2024 2025
2	Connor Hughes	66	2002 2003 2004 2005
3	Rafael Garcia	58	1993 1994 1995 1996
4	Robert Randolph	46	2008 2009 2010 2011
5	Ian Frye	45	2012 2013 2014 2015
6	Brian Delaney	42	2018 2019 2020
7	Wayne Morrison	38	1979 1980 1981 1982
8	Kenny Stadlin	37	1983 1984 1985
9	Jake McInerney	31	1989 1990

Single season
Rk	Player	FGs	Year
1	Will Bettridge	24	2025
2	Connor Hughes	23	2003
3	Ian Frye	22	2014
4	Rafael Garcia	21	1996
	Connor Hughes	21	2005
6	Rafael Garcia	20	1995
	Brian Delaney	20	2019
8	Will Bettridge	18	2023
	Will Bettridge	18	2024
10	Connor Hughes	17	2004

Single game
Rk	Player	FGs	Year	Opponent
1	Rafael Garcia	5	1994	Virginia Tech
	Connor Hughes	5	2003	Georgia Tech
	Chris Gould	5	2007	North Carolina

=== Field goal percentage ===
Career
Rk	Player	FG%	Years
1	Jake McInerney	83.8%	1989 1990
2	Connor Hughes	83.5%	2002 2003 2004 2005
3	Will Bettridge	81.7%	2022 2023 2024 2025
4	Brian Delaney	79.2%	2018 2019 2020
5	Ian Frye	77.6%	2012 2013 2014 2015

Single season
Rk	Player	FG%	Year
1	Connor Hughes	92.0%	2003
2	Jake McInerney	88.2%	1990
3	Connor Hughes	87.5%	2005
