= List of Virginia Cavaliers in the NFL draft =

This is a list of Virginia Cavaliers football players in the NFL draft.

== Key ==
B	Back	K	Kicker	NT	Nose tackle
C	Center	LB	Linebacker	FB	Fullback
DB	Defensive back	P	Punter	HB	Halfback
DE	Defensive end	QB	Quarterback	WR	Wide receiver
DT	Defensive tackle	RB	Running back	G	Guard
E	End	T	Offensive tackle	TE	Tight end

== Selections ==
Year	Round	Pick	Overall	Player	Team	Position	Notes
1940	18	9	169	Jim Gillette	Green Bay Packers	B	
1942	1	1	1	Bill Dudley	Pittsburgh Steelers	B	
1945	14	9	140	John Duda	Philadelphia Eagles	B	
1946	13	2	112	Joe Kirkland	Boston Yanks	T	
1946	28	5	265	Charlie Ellis	New York Giants	B	
1947	23	3	208	Tom Dudley	Washington Redskins	E	
1948	5	5	30	Bruce Bailey	Los Angeles Rams	B	
1948	6	5	40	George Grimes	Los Angeles Rams	B	
1948	18	9	164	Ray Brown	Chicago Bears	B	
1948	22	9	204	Lockwood Frizzell	Philadelphia Eagles	C	
1948	28	4	259	Joe McCary	Boston Yanks	B	
1948	32	1	294	George Neff	Boston Yanks	B	
1949	19	6	187	Joe Leonard	Los Angeles Rams	T	
1950	13	3	160	Carlton Elliott	Green Bay Packers	E	
1951	1	12	12	Gene Schroeder	Chicago Bears	E	
1951	7	2	76	John Papit	Washington Redskins	B	
1951	20	2	233	Dick Johnson	Green Bay Packers	T	
1952	5	9	58	Bob Miller	Detroit Lions	T	
1952	20	7	236	Jimmy Lesane	Chicago Bears	B	
1952	28	9	334	Joe Palumbo	San Francisco 49ers	G	
1953	5	11	60	Tom Scott	Los Angeles Rams	E	
1953	21	12	253	Bob Tata	Detroit Lions	B	
1954	13	8	153	Joe Mehalick	Philadelphia Eagles	T	
1956	15	6	175	John Polzer	Baltimore Colts	QB	
1956	27	6	319	Herb Hartwell	Baltimore Colts	B	
1957	5	3	52	Henry Jordan	Cleveland Browns	DT	
1957	19	10	227	Bob Gunderman	Detroit Lions	E	
1958	7	9	82	John Diehl	Baltimore Colts	T	
1958	7	12	85	Hal Outten	Detroit Lions	T	
1958	16	5	186	Fred Polzer	Washington Redskins	E	
1958	19	1	218	Sonny Randle	Chicago Cardinals	B	
1960	13	9	153	Dave Graham	Philadelphia Eagles	E	
1962	4	14	56	Ron Gassert	Green Bay Packers	T	
1963	4	11	53	Harlow Fullwood	Baltimore Colts	G	
1963	7	14	98	Turnley Todd	Green Bay Packers	LB	
1964	14	12	194	Terry Sieg	Cleveland Browns	B	
1965	7	11	95	Bob Kowalkowski	Detroit Lions	G	
1966	4	8	56	Don Parker	San Francisco 49ers	G	
1966	8	7	117	John Pincavage	Detroit Lions	RB	
1967	2	4	30	Bob Davis	Houston Oilers	QB	
1967	7	5	164	Ed Carrington	Houston Oilers	WR	
1967	10	18	255	Jim Copeland	Cleveland Browns	G	
1967	11	14	277	Carroll Jarvis	San Diego Chargers	RB	
1967	14	26	367	George Stetter	New Orleans Saints	DB	
1968	5	25	136	John Naponic	Oakland Raiders	T	
1969	5	9	113	Frank Quayle	Denver Broncos	RB	
1969	7	10	166	Jeff Anderson	Washington Redskins	RB	
1969	10	20	254	Greg Shelly	Cleveland Browns	G	
1969	14	9	347	Rick Brand	Washington Redskins	DT	
1969	15	10	374	Paul Rogers	Washington Redskins	T	
1971	13	10	322	Dan Ryczek	Washington Redskins	C	
1972	13	9	321	Andy Selfridge	San Diego Chargers	LB	
1973	15	20	384	Dave Sullivan	Cleveland Browns	WR	
1974	4	3	81	Harrison Davis	San Diego Chargers	WR	
1974	10	18	252	Paul Ryczek	Atlanta Falcons	C	
1974	11	10	270	Kent Merritt	New Orleans Saints	WR	
1975	12	4	290	Dick Ambrose	Cleveland Browns	LB	
1975	15	17	381	Ken Shelton	Denver Broncos	TE	
1975	16	12	402	Ken Lambert	Houston Oilers	DB	
1976	1	15	15	Tom Glassic	Denver Broncos	G	
1976	8	6	215	Scott Gardner	Buffalo Bills	QB	
1977	2	25	53	Mike Ozdowski	Baltimore Colts	DE	
1978	5	25	135	John Choma	San Diego Chargers	G	
1979	9	4	224	Russ Henderson	Baltimore Colts	P	
1980	5	8	118	Tony Blount	New York Giants	DB	
1980	8	18	211	Grant Hudson	St. Louis Cardinals	DT	
1981	5	27	138	Tommy Vigorito	Miami Dolphins	RB	
1982	4	21	104	Stuart Anderson	Kansas City Chiefs	LB	
1982	12	2	308	Greg Taylor	New England Patriots	WR	
1984	7	17	185	Quentin Walker	St. Louis Cardinals	RB	
1984	8	7	203	Billy Griggs	New York Jets	TE	
1985	2	12	40	Lester Lyles	New York Jets	DB	
1985	4	15	99	Bob Olderman	Kansas City Chiefs	G	
1985	7	25	193	Ron Mattes	Seattle Seahawks	T	
1986	1	6	6	Jim Dombrowski	New Orleans Saints	T	
1986	3	7	62	Barry Word	New Orleans Saints	RB	
1986	6	18	156	Jim Huddleston	Washington Redskins	G	
1987	10	4	255	Don Majkowski	Green Bay Packers	QB	
1988	6	14	151	Scott Secules	Dallas Cowboys	QB	
1989	1	14	14	Jeff Lageman	New York Jets	LB	
1989	2	2	30	John Ford	Detroit Lions	WR	
1989	7	19	186	David Griggs	New Orleans Saints	LB	
1990	6	12	149	Marcus Wilson	Los Angeles Raiders	RB	
1990	8	5	198	Ray Savage	Los Angeles Rams	LB	
1990	11	12	288	Tim O'Connor	Cincinnati Bengals	T	
1991	1	10	10	Herman Moore	Detroit Lions	WR	
1991	4	10	93	Tony Covington	Tampa Bay Buccaneers	DB	
1991	9	15	238	Bruce McGonnigal	Pittsburgh Steelers	TE	
1991	11	6	284	Shawn Moore	Denver Broncos	QB	
1992	1	10	10	Ray Roberts	Seattle Seahawks	T	
1992	2	12	40	Matt Blundin	Kansas City Chiefs	QB	
1992	10	21	273	Nikki Fisher	Chicago Bears	RB	
1993	2	2	31	Chris Slade	New England Patriots	DE	
1993	3	22	78	Terry Kirby	Miami Dolphins	RB	
1993	4	4	88	David Ware	New York Jets	T	
1993	6	7	147	Greg Jeffries	Detroit Lions	DB	
1994	3	6	71	Keith Lyle	St. Louis Rams	DB	
1994	5	30	161	Jim Reid	Houston Oilers	T	
1995	3	30	94	Mike Frederick	Cleveland Browns	DE	
1995	4	9	107	Tyrone Davis	New York Jets	WR	
1995	6	35	206	Charles Way	New York Giants	RB	
1996	5	27	159	Patrick Jeffers	Denver Broncos	WR	
1997	1	8	8	James Farrior	New York Jets	LB	
1997	1	25	25	Jon Harris	Philadelphia Eagles	DE	
1997	2	4	34	Jamie Sharper	Baltimore Ravens	LB	
1997	2	6	36	Tiki Barber	New York Giants	RB	
1997	3	6	66	Ronde Barber	Tampa Bay Buccaneers	DB	
1997	5	31	161	Duane Ashman	Detroit Lions	DE	
1998	2	20	50	Germane Crowell	Detroit Lions	WR	
1998	5	18	141	Doug Karczewski	New York Jets	T	
1999	1	30	30	Patrick Kerney	Atlanta Falcons	DE	
1999	4	29	124	Wali Rainer	Cleveland Browns	LB	
1999	4	36	131	Aaron Brooks	Green Bay Packers	QB	
1999	7	8	214	Antonio Dingle	Pittsburgh Steelers	DT	
1999	7	10	216	Anthony Poindexter	Baltimore Ravens	DB	
1999	7	20	226	Robert Hunt	Tampa Bay Buccaneers	G	
2000	1	7	7	Thomas Jones	Arizona Cardinals	RB	Pro Bowl (2008)
2000	3	32	94	John St. Clair	St. Louis Rams	C	
2000	6	18	184	Shannon Taylor	San Diego Chargers	LB	
2000	6	21	187	Antwan Harris	New England Patriots	DB	
2001	5	10	141	Billy Baber	Kansas City Chiefs	TE	
2002	4	20	118	Chris Luzar	Jacksonville Jaguars	TE	
2002	7	20	231	Monsanto Pope	Denver Broncos	DT	
2002	7	26	237	Antwoine Womack	New England Patriots	RB	
2003	3	30	94	Angelo Crowell	Buffalo Bills	LB	
2003	3	31	95	Billy McMullen	Philadelphia Eagles	WR	
2004	3	27	90	Matt Schaub	Atlanta Falcons	QB	2× Pro Bowl (2009, 2012)
2005	1	30	30	Heath Miller	Pittsburgh Steelers	TE	2× Pro Bowl (2009, 2012); All-Rookie Team (2005)
2005	3	31	95	Darryl Blackstock	Arizona Cardinals	LB	
2005	4	10	111	Elton Brown	Arizona Cardinals	G	
2005	4	26	127	Alvin Pearman	Jacksonville Jaguars	RB	
2005	4	31	132	Chris Canty	Dallas Cowboys	DE	
2005	6	29	203	Andrew Hoffman	Cleveland Browns	DT	
2005	7	34	248	Patrick Estes	San Francisco 49ers	TE	
2006	1	4	4	D'Brickashaw Ferguson	New York Jets	T	3× Pro Bowl (2009–2011); All-Rookie Team (2006)
2006	5	10	143	Brad Butler	Buffalo Bills	T	
2006	5	11	144	Marques Hagans	St. Louis Rams	WR	
2006	6	1	170	Wali Lundy	Houston Texans	RB	
2006	6	19	188	Kurt Smith	San Diego Chargers	K	
2007	7	34	244	Jason Snelling	Atlanta Falcons	RB	
2007	7	35	245	Marcus Hamilton	Tampa Bay Buccaneers	DB	
2008	1	2	2	Chris Long	St. Louis Rams	DE	All-Rookie Team (2008)
2008	1	15	15	Branden Albert	Kansas City Chiefs	G	2× Pro Bowl (2013, 2015)
2008	6	30	196	Tom Santi	Indianapolis Colts	TE	
2009	1	8	8	Eugene Monroe	Jacksonville Jaguars	T	
2009	2	13	45	Clint Sintim	New York Giants	LB	
2009	6	12	185	Cedric Peerman	Baltimore Ravens	RB	Pro Bowl (2015)
2009	6	35	208	John Phillips	Dallas Cowboys	TE	
2010	2	2	34	Chris Cook	Minnesota Vikings	DB	
2011	2	1	33	Ras-I Dowling	New England Patriots	DB	
2012	7	30	237	Cam Johnson	San Francisco 49ers	DE	
2013	5	8	141	Oday Aboushi	New York Jets	T	
2014	3	2	66	Morgan Moses	Washington Redskins	T	
2014	4	34	134	Brent Urban	Baltimore Ravens	DT	
2014	6	29	205	Luke Bowanko	Jacksonville Jaguars	C	
2015	3	15	79	Eli Harold	San Francisco 49ers	LB	
2015	6	3	179	Max Valles	Oakland Raiders	LB	
2016	6	34	209	Maurice Canady	Baltimore Ravens	DB	
2018	5	10	147	Micah Kiser	Los Angeles Rams	LB	
2018	5	21	158	Andrew Brown	Cincinnati Bengals	DE	
2019	2	31	63	Juan Thornhill	Kansas City Chiefs	DB	All-Rookie Team (2019)
2019	6	25	198	Tim Harris	San Francisco 49ers	DB	
2020	5	5	151	Joe Reed	Los Angeles Chargers	WR	
2020	5	12	158	Bryce Hall	New York Jets	DB	
2022	3	9	73	Jelani Woods	Indianapolis Colts	TE	
2023	5	24	159	Dontayvion Wicks	Green Bay Packers	WR	
2024	6	8	184	Malik Washington	Miami Dolphins	WR	
2025	3	29	93	Jonas Sanker	New Orleans Saints	S	

== Notable undrafted players ==
Note: No drafts held before 1920

Year	Player	Position	Debut Team	Notes
1963	Gary Cuozzo	QB	Baltimore Colts	—
1980	Steve Potter	LB	Oakland Raiders	—
1983	Ed Reynolds	LB	New England Patriots	—
1993	Michael Husted	K	Tampa Bay Buccaneers	—
1995	Ryan Kuehl	DT	San Francisco 49ers	—
2000	Casey Crawford	TE	Carolina Panthers	—
2000	Noel LaMontagne	T	Cleveland Browns	—
2001	Byron Thweatt	LB	Tennessee Titans	—
2001	Patrick Washington	FB	Jacksonville Jaguars	—
2009	Kevin Ogletree	WR	Dallas Cowboys	—
2011	Danny Aiken	LS	Buffalo Bills	—
2012	Rodney McLeod	S	St. Louis Rams	—
2019	Olamide Zaccheaus	WR	Atlanta Falcons	—
2025	Chris Tyree	WR	New Orleans Saints	—
2026	Jahmeer Carter	DT	Los Angeles Chargers	—
2026	Mitchell Melton	DE	Indianapolis Colts	—
2026	Cam Ross	WR	Denver Broncos	—
2026	J'Mari Taylor	RB	Jacksonville Jaguars	—
