= 1992 Virginia Cavaliers football team =

American college football season

1992 Virginia Cavaliers football
- Conference: Atlantic Coast Conference
- Record: 7–4 (4–4 ACC)
- Head coach: George Welsh (11th season)
- Offensive coordinator: Tom O'Brien (2nd season)
- Defensive coordinator: Rick Lantz (2nd season)
- Captains: Terry Kirby; Chris Slade; Gary Steele
- Home stadium: Scott Stadium

1992 Atlantic Coast Conference football standings
	Conf.					Overall
Team	W		L		T	W		L		T
No. 2 Florida State $	8	–	0	–	0	11	–	1	–	0
No. 17 NC State	6	–	2	–	0	9	–	3	–	1
No. 19 North Carolina	5	–	3	–	0	9	–	3	–	0
No. 25 Wake Forest	4	–	4	–	0	8	–	4	–	0
Virginia	4	–	4	–	0	7	–	4	–	0
Georgia Tech	4	–	4	–	0	5	–	6	–	0
Clemson	3	–	5	–	0	5	–	6	–	0
Maryland	2	–	6	–	0	3	–	8	–	0
Duke	0	–	8	–	0	2	–	9	–	0
$ – Conference champion; Rankings from AP Poll

The 1992 Virginia Cavaliers football team represented the University of Virginia as a member of the Atlantic Coast Conference (ACC) during the 1992 NCAA Division I-A football season. Led by 11th-year head coach George Welsh, the Cavaliers compiled an overall record of 7–4 with a mark of 4–4 in conference play, placing in a three-way tie for fourth in the ACC. The team played home games at Scott Stadium in Charlottesville, Virginia.

== Schedule ==
Date	Time	Opponent	Rank	Site	TV	Result	Attendance	Source
September 5	7:00 pm	Maryland	No. 25	Scott Stadium; Charlottesville, VA (rivalry)		W 28–15	44,400	
September 12	7:00 pm	at Navy*	No. 23	Navy–Marine Corps Memorial Stadium; Annapolis, MD		W 53–0	28,627	
September 19	1:00 pm	No. 22 Georgia Tech	No. 20	Scott Stadium; Charlottesville, VA		W 55–24	42,100	
September 26	7:00 pm	at Duke	No. 14	Wallace Wade Stadium; Durham, NC		W 55–28	24,400	
October 3	1:00 pm	at Wake Forest	No. 14	Groves Stadium; Winston-Salem, NC		W 31–17	22,135	
October 10	3:30 pm	No. 25 Clemson	No. 10	Scott Stadium; Charlottesville, VA	ABC	L 28–29	44,400	
October 17	12:00 pm	at North Carolina	No. 17	Kenan Memorial Stadium; Chapel Hill, NC (South's Oldest Rivalry)	JPS	L 7–27	45,500	
October 24	1:00 pm	No. 10 (I-AA) William & Mary*^{†}	No. 24	Scott Stadium; Charlottesville, VA		W 33–7	40,100	
October 31	7:30 pm	No. 6 Florida State	No. 23	Scott Stadium; Charlottesville, VA (Jefferson–Eppes Trophy)		L 3–13	45,000	
November 7	12:00 pm	No. 17 NC State		Scott Stadium; Charlottesville, VA	JPS	L 7–31	41,400	
November 21	4:00 pm	at Virginia Tech*		Lane Stadium; Blacksburg, VA (rivalry)		W 41–38	53,271	
*Non-conference game; ^{†}Homecoming; Rankings from AP Poll released prior to the game

== Season summary ==
=== at Navy ===
- Bobby Goodman 5 TD passes

== Personnel ==
1992 Virginia Cavaliers football team roster
Players
Coaches
Offense

Pos.	#	Name	Class
RB	30	Charles Way
RB	42	Terry Kirby
WR	81	Patrick Jeffers
WR	82	Tyrone Davis
QB		Wayne Lineburg	Fr

Defense

Pos.	#	Name	Class
DB	25	Keith Lyle
LB	55	Eddie Robertson
DE	85	Chris Slade	Sr
DE, DT	99	Ryan Kuehl	So

Special teams

Pos.	#	Name	Class
K	5	Charles Fiveash	Jr
K	18	Michael Husted	Sr

Head coach

- George Welsh

Coordinators/assistant coaches

- Jim Bollman (OL)

Legend

- (C) Team captain
- (S) Suspended
- (I) Ineligible
- Injured
- Redshirt

Roster
