= Don Parker =

Don or Donald Parker may refer to:

- Donald C. Parker (1939–2015), American astronomer
- Donald E. Parker (born before 1980), American psychologist
- Don Parker (racing driver) (1908–1997), British racing driver
- Don Parker (American football), from List of Virginia Cavaliers in the NFL draft
- Donn B. Parker (1929–2021), American information technology specialist
