= 1993 Peach Bowl =

1993 Peach Bowl may refer to:

- 1993 Peach Bowl (January), January 2, 1993, game between the North Carolina Tar Heels and the Mississippi State Bulldogs
- 1993 Peach Bowl (December), December 31, 1993, game between the Clemson Tigers and the Kentucky Wildcats
