= 1992 Wake Forest Demon Deacons football team =

American college football season

1992 Wake Forest Demon Deacons football

Independence Bowl champion

Independence Bowl, W 39–35 vs. Oregon
- Conference: Atlantic Coast Conference

Ranking
- Coaches: No. 25
- AP: No. 25
- Record: 8–4 (4–4 ACC)
- Head coach: Bill Dooley (6th season)
- Offensive coordinator: Eddie Williamson (2nd season)
- Defensive coordinator: Bob Brush (4th season)
- Captains: George Coghill; Ben Coleman; Maurice Miller
- Home stadium: Groves Stadium

1992 Atlantic Coast Conference football standings
	Conf.					Overall
Team	W		L		T	W		L		T
No. 2 Florida State $	8	–	0	–	0	11	–	1	–	0
No. 17 NC State	6	–	2	–	0	9	–	3	–	1
No. 19 North Carolina	5	–	3	–	0	9	–	3	–	0
No. 25 Wake Forest	4	–	4	–	0	8	–	4	–	0
Virginia	4	–	4	–	0	7	–	4	–	0
Georgia Tech	4	–	4	–	0	5	–	6	–	0
Clemson	3	–	5	–	0	5	–	6	–	0
Maryland	2	–	6	–	0	3	–	8	–	0
Duke	0	–	8	–	0	2	–	9	–	0
$ – Conference champion; Rankings from AP Poll

The 1992 Wake Forest Demon Deacons football team was the American football representative of Wake Forest University during the 1992 NCAA Division I-A football season. Led by head coach Bill Dooley in his sixth season, the team achieved an impressive 8–4 record. They concluded the season in a tie for fourth place in the Atlantic Coast Conference and secured a victory over Oregon Oregon in the 1992 Independence Bowl.

== Schedule ==
Date	Time	Opponent	Rank	Site	TV	Result	Attendance	Source
September 5	12:00 pm	North Carolina		Groves Stadium; Winston-Salem, NC (rivalry)	JPS	L 17–35	23,447	
September 12	6:30 pm	Appalachian State*		Groves Stadium; Winston-Salem, NC		W 10–7	24,387	
September 26	7:00 pm	at No. 3 Florida State		Doak Campbell Stadium; Tallahassee, FL		L 7–35	62,915	
October 3	1:00 pm	No. 14 Virginia		Groves Stadium; Winston-Salem, NC		L 17–31	22,135	
October 10	2:00 pm	at Vanderbilt*		Vanderbilt Stadium; Nashville, TN		W 40–6	33,660	
October 17	1:30 pm	at Maryland		Byrd Stadium; College Park, MD		W 30–23	31,132	
October 24	1:00 pm	Army*		Groves Stadium; Winston-Salem, NC		W 23–7	18,221	
October 31	1:00 pm	Clemson		Groves Stadium; Winston-Salem, NC		W 18–15	21,839	
November 7	1:30 pm	at Duke		Wallace Wade Stadium; Durham, NC (rivalry)		W 28–14	33,600	
November 14	1:00 pm	at Georgia Tech		Bobby Dodd Stadium; Atlanta, GA		W 23–10	40,006	
November 21	1:00 pm	at No. 13 NC State	No. 25	Carter–Finley Stadium; Raleigh, NC (rivalry)		L 14–42	46,121	
December 31	12:30 pm	vs. Oregon*		Independence Stadium; Shreveport, LA (Independence Bowl)	ESPN	W 39–35	31,337	
*Non-conference game; Rankings from AP Poll released prior to the game; All times are in Eastern time
