= Bill Jackson (American football) =

American football player (born 1960)

No. 36
- Position: Defensive back

Personal information
- Born: July 1, 1960 (age 66); Winston-Salem, North Carolina, U.S.
- Listed height: 6 ft 1 in (1.85 m)
- Listed weight: 202 lb (92 kg)

Career information
- High school: North Forsyth (Winston-Salem)
- College: North Carolina
- NFL draft: 1982: 8th round, 211th overall pick

Career history
- Cleveland Browns (1982)

Career NFL statistics
- Fumble recoveries: 1
- Stats at Pro Football Reference

William Steven Jackson (born July 1, 1960) is an American former professional football player who was a defensive back for one season with the Cleveland Browns of the National Football League (NFL) in 1982. He played college football for the North Carolina Tar Heels.

== Professional career ==
Jackson was selected by the Cleveland Browns in the eighth round of the 1982 NFL draft. He played nine games for the Browns in the 1982 season, in which he recovered one fumble.
