= Steve Greer (linebacker) =

American football player

No. 53 (Virginia)
- Position: Linebacker

Personal information
- Listed height: 6 ft 0 in (1.83 m)
- Listed weight: 236 lb (107 kg)

Career information
- High school: Solon (Solon, Ohio)
- College: Virginia (2008–2012)
- NFL draft: 2013: undrafted

Career history
- Washington Redskins (2013)*
- * Offseason or practice squad member only

Awards and highlights
- First-team All-ACC (2012); Second-team All-ACC (2011)
- Stats at Pro Football Reference

Steve Greer is an American former football linebacker. He played college football for the Virginia Cavaliers and signed with the Washington Redskins as an undrafted free agent in 2013.

== Early life ==
Steve Greer played high school football at Solon High School in Solon, Ohio. He led the team in tackles as both a junior and senior. He earned first-team all-state honors his senior year in 2007 after posting 150 tackles, two interceptions, and two fumble recoveries. Greer received offers from Virginia, North Carolina, Oklahoma State, Air Force, Washington State, Ohio, Rice, and Eastern Michigan.

== College career ==
Greer enrolled at the University of Virginia to play college football for the Cavaliers. He redshirted the 2008 season and was a four-year letterman from 2009 to 2012. He played in all 12 games in 2009, recording one sack, three pass breakups, and a team-leading 92 tackles (49 solo, 43 assisted). He made a team-high ten tackles during his first college game. He garnered honorable mention All-Atlantic Coast Conference (ACC) recognition for the 2009 season. He was also named a Freshman All-American by Phil Steele and CollegeFootballNews.com, and third-team All-ACC by Phil Steele.

Greer missed 2010 spring drills due to a high ankle sprain. The Cavaliers moved from a 3–4 defense to a 4–3 defense, which uses one less linebacker. As a result, Greer only started one game during the 2010 season but still managed to finish second on the team in tackles. He played in all 12 games overall in 2010, ending the year with 59 combined tackles, 0.5 sacks, and one forced fumble.

Greer started all 12 regular season games in 2011, totaling two sacks, one fumble recovery, four pass breakups, and a team-leading 103 tackles (43 solo, 60 assisted). He did not play in the 2011 Chick-fil-A Bowl due to a torn ACL. He was named second-team All-ACC for his performance during the 2011 season.

Greer started all 12 games for the second straight year in 2012 and also served as a team captain. He led the team in tackles with 122 (45 solo, 77 assisted) while also posting two sacks and six pass breakups. He was named the ACC Linebacker of the Week after making a career-high 19 tackles in his final college game on November 24, 2012, against Virginia Tech. His 122 tackles were the second-most in the ACC that year while his 77 assisted tackles led the ACC. He earned first-team All-ACC honors. Greer's 376 career tackles were the sixth-most in school history at the time. They were also the most among any active ACC player and the second-most among active Bowl Championship Series players (only behind Notre Dame's Manti Teʻo). As of 2026, his 376 tackles are the sixth-most in the ACC since 2005. Greer was invited to the 2013 East–West Shrine Game.

== Professional career ==
After going undrafted in the 2013 NFL draft, Greer signed with the Washington Redskins on April 29, 2013. He was released on May 8, 2013.

== See also ==
- Virginia Cavaliers football statistical leaders
