= 1992 NC State Wolfpack football team =

American college football season

1992 NC State Wolfpack football

Gator Bowl, L 10–27 vs. Florida
- Conference: Atlantic Coast Conference

Ranking
- Coaches: No. 15
- AP: No. 17
- Record: 9–3–1 (6–2 ACC)
- Head coach: Dick Sheridan (7th season)
- Defensive coordinator: Buddy Green (3rd season)
- Home stadium: Carter–Finley Stadium

1992 Atlantic Coast Conference football standings
	Conf.					Overall
Team	W		L		T	W		L		T
No. 2 Florida State $	8	–	0	–	0	11	–	1	–	0
No. 17 NC State	6	–	2	–	0	9	–	3	–	1
No. 19 North Carolina	5	–	3	–	0	9	–	3	–	0
No. 25 Wake Forest	4	–	4	–	0	8	–	4	–	0
Virginia	4	–	4	–	0	7	–	4	–	0
Georgia Tech	4	–	4	–	0	5	–	6	–	0
Clemson	3	–	5	–	0	5	–	6	–	0
Maryland	2	–	6	–	0	3	–	8	–	0
Duke	0	–	8	–	0	2	–	9	–	0
$ – Conference champion; Rankings from AP Poll

The 1992 NC State Wolfpack football team represented North Carolina State University during the 1992 NCAA Division I-A football season. The team's head coach was Dick Sheridan. NC State has been a member of the Atlantic Coast Conference (ACC) since the league's inception in 1953. The Wolfpack played its home games in 1992 at Carter–Finley Stadium in Raleigh, North Carolina, which has been NC State football's home stadium since 1966.

== Schedule ==
Date	Time	Opponent	Rank	Site	TV	Result	Attendance	Source
August 29	9:00 p.m.	vs. No. 16 Iowa*		Giants Stadium; East Rutherford, NJ (Kickoff Classic)	NBC	W 24–14	46,251	
September 5		Appalachian State*	No. 18	Carter–Finley Stadium; Raleigh, NC		W 35–10	41,095	
September 12		at Maryland	No. 19	Byrd Stadium; College Park, MD		W 14–10	27,550	
September 19	12:00 p.m.	No. 3 Florida State	No. 16	Carter–Finley Stadium; Raleigh, NC	JPS	L 13–34	53,900	
September 26		at North Carolina	No. 23	Kenan Memorial Stadium; Chapel Hill, NC (rivalry)	JPS	W 27–20	53,725	
October 3		at No. 23 Georgia Tech	No. 21	Bobby Dodd Stadium; Atlanta, GA	Raycom	L 13–16	40,761	
October 10	1:00 p.m.	Texas Tech*	No. 25	Carter–Finley Stadium; Raleigh, NC		W 48–13	41,800	
October 17	1:00 p.m.	at Virginia Tech*	No. 21	Lane Stadium; Blacksburg, VA		T 13–13	43,628	
October 24	12:00 p.m.	No. 18 Clemson	No. 23	Carter–Finley Stadium; Raleigh, NC (Textile Bowl)	JPS	W 20–6	53,676	
November 7		at Virginia	No. 17	Scott Stadium; Charlottesville, VA		W 31–7	41,400	
November 14		Duke	No. 14	Carter–Finley Stadium; Raleigh, NC (rivalry)		W 45–27	46,350	
November 21	1:00 p.m.	No. 25 Wake Forest	No. 13	Carter–Finley Stadium; Raleigh, NC (rivalry)		W 42–14	46,121	
December 31		vs. No. 14 Florida*	No. 12	Gator Bowl Stadium; Jacksonville, FL (Gator Bowl)	TBS	L 10–27	71,233	
*Non-conference game; Rankings from AP Poll released prior to the game; All times are in Eastern time

== Team players drafted into the NFL ==
Player	Position	Round	Pick	NFL club
Mike Reid	Defensive back	3	77	Philadelphia Eagles
Sebastian Savage	Defensive back	5	139	Buffalo Bills
David Merritt	Linebacker	7	191	Miami Dolphins
