= 1992 Clemson Tigers football team =

American college football season

1992 Clemson Tigers football
- Conference: Atlantic Coast Conference
- Record: 5–6 (3–5 ACC)
- Head coach: Ken Hatfield (3rd season)
- Offensive coordinator: Larry Van Der Hayden (3rd season)
- Defensive coordinator: Ron Dickerson (2nd season)
- Captains: Robert O'Neal; Wayne Simmons
- Home stadium: Memorial Stadium

1992 Atlantic Coast Conference football standings
	Conf.					Overall
Team	W		L		T	W		L		T
No. 2 Florida State $	8	–	0	–	0	11	–	1	–	0
No. 17 NC State	6	–	2	–	0	9	–	3	–	1
No. 19 North Carolina	5	–	3	–	0	9	–	3	–	0
No. 25 Wake Forest	4	–	4	–	0	8	–	4	–	0
Virginia	4	–	4	–	0	7	–	4	–	0
Georgia Tech	4	–	4	–	0	5	–	6	–	0
Clemson	3	–	5	–	0	5	–	6	–	0
Maryland	2	–	6	–	0	3	–	8	–	0
Duke	0	–	8	–	0	2	–	9	–	0
$ – Conference champion; Rankings from AP Poll

The 1992 Clemson Tigers football team represented Clemson University as a member of the Atlantic Coast Conference (ACC) during the 1992 NCAA Division I-A football season. Led by third-year head coach Ken Hatfield, the Tigers compiled an overall record of 5–6 with a mark of 3–5 in conference play, and finished seventh in the ACC. Clemson played home games at Memorial Stadium in Clemson, South Carolina. At the time, the comeback against Virginia was the largest comeback margin in school history. However, the Tigers finished with a losing record for the first time since 1976, and failed to qualify for a bowl game for the first time since 1980.

== Schedule ==
Date	Time	Opponent	Rank	Site	TV	Result	Attendance	Source
September 5	1:00 p.m.	Ball State*	No. 13	Memorial Stadium; Clemson, SC		W 24–10	69,077	
September 12	7:30 p.m.	No. 5 Florida State	No. 15	Memorial Stadium; Clemson, SC (rivalry)	ESPN	L 20–24	83,170	
September 26	7:30 p.m.	at Georgia Tech	No. 16	Bobby Dodd Stadium; Atlanta, GA (rivalry)	ESPN	L 16–20	46,033	
October 3	1:00 p.m.	No. 19 (I-AA) Chattanooga*	No. 25	Memorial Stadium; Clemson, SC		W 54–3	71,486	
October 10	3:30 p.m.	at No. 10 Virginia	No. 25	Scott Stadium; Charlottesville, VA	ABC	W 29–28	44,400	
October 17	1:00 p.m.	Duke^{†}	No. 19	Memorial Stadium; Clemson, SC		W 21–6	77,532	
October 24	12:00 p.m.	at No. 23 NC State	No. 18	Carter–Finley Stadium; Raleigh, NC (Textile Bowl)	JPS	L 6–20	53,676	
October 31	1:00 p.m.	at Wake Forest		Groves Stadium; Winston-Salem, NC		L 15–18	21,839	
November 7	1:00 p.m.	No. 18 North Carolina		Memorial Stadium; Clemson, SC		W 40–7	76,155	
November 14	12:00 p.m.	at Maryland		Byrd Stadium; College Park, MD	JPS	L 23–53	25,223	
November 21	12:00 p.m.	South Carolina*		Memorial Stadium; Clemson, SC (rivalry)	JPS	L 13–24	83,312	
*Non-conference game; ^{†}Homecoming; Rankings from AP Poll released prior to the game; All times are in Eastern time

== Roster ==
1992 Clemson Tigers football team roster
Players
Coaches
Offense

Pos.	#	Name	Class
WR	3	Stanley Banks	Jr
OT	69	Kevin Brooks	Jr
WR	1	Dwayne Bryant	Jr
QB	7	Richard Moncrief	Jr
C	61	Bryce Nelson	Jr
WR	20	Larry Ryans	Sr
RB	31	Derrick Witherspoon	Jr

Defense

Pos.	#	Name	Class
DT	89	Brentson Buckner	Jr
LB	45	John McMakin	Jr
CB	15	Robert O'Neal	Sr
LB	96	Ashley Sheppard	Sr
LB	49	Wayne Simmons	Sr
CB	27	James Trapp	Sr

Special teams

Pos.	#	Name	Class
P	25	Matt Bullman	So

Head coach

- Frank Howard

Coordinators/assistant coaches

Legend

- (C) Team captain
- (S) Suspended
- (I) Ineligible
- Injured
- Redshirt

Roster
