= 1992 Georgia Tech Yellow Jackets football team =

American college football season

1992 Georgia Tech Yellow Jackets football
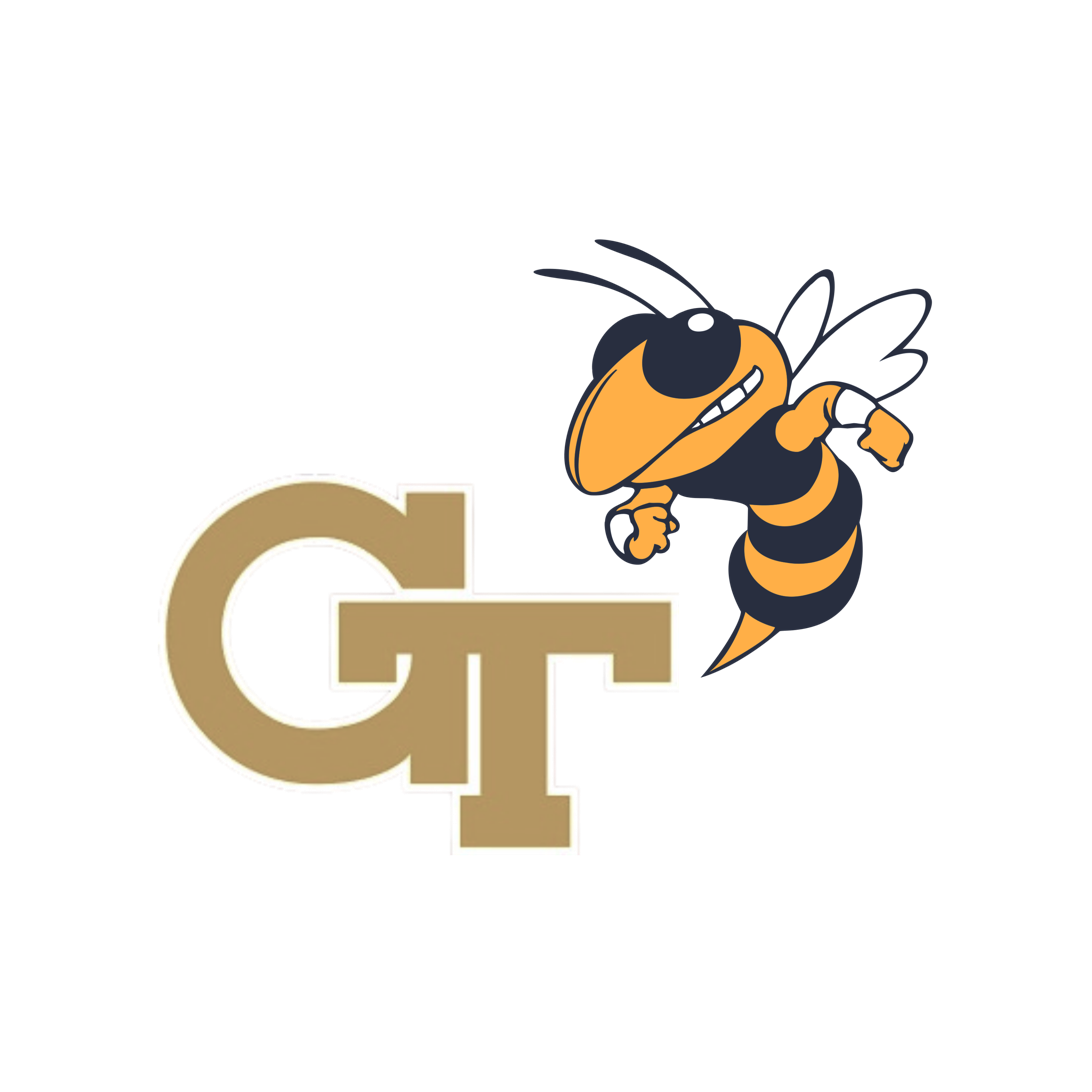
- Conference: Atlantic Coast Conference
- Record: 5–6 (4–4 ACC)
- Head coach: Bill Lewis (1st season)
- Offensive coordinator: Steve Shankweiler (1st season)
- Defensive coordinator: Mike Cassity (1st season)
- Captains: Shawn Jones; Coleman Rudolph; Kevin Battle; Steve Pharr
- Home stadium: Bobby Dodd Stadium

1992 Atlantic Coast Conference football standings
| | Conf. | | | | | Overall |
| Team | W | | L | | T | W | | L | | T |
|---|---|---|---|---|---|---|---|---|---|---|
| No. 2 Florida State $ | 8 | – | 0 | – | 0 | 11 | – | 1 | – | 0 |
| No. 17 NC State | 6 | – | 2 | – | 0 | 9 | – | 3 | – | 1 |
| No. 19 North Carolina | 5 | – | 3 | – | 0 | 9 | – | 3 | – | 0 |
| No. 25 Wake Forest | 4 | – | 4 | – | 0 | 8 | – | 4 | – | 0 |
| Virginia | 4 | – | 4 | – | 0 | 7 | – | 4 | – | 0 |
| Georgia Tech | 4 | – | 4 | – | 0 | 5 | – | 6 | – | 0 |
| Clemson | 3 | – | 5 | – | 0 | 5 | – | 6 | – | 0 |
| Maryland | 2 | – | 6 | – | 0 | 3 | – | 8 | – | 0 |
| Duke | 0 | – | 8 | – | 0 | 2 | – | 9 | – | 0 |
$ – Conference champion; Rankings from AP Poll

The 1992 Georgia Tech Yellow Jackets football team represented the Georgia Institute of Technology during the 1992 NCAA Division I-A football season. The Yellow Jackets were led by first-year head coach Bill Lewis and played their home games at Bobby Dodd Stadium in Atlanta. They competed as members of the Atlantic Coast Conference, finishing tied for fourth with a final record of 5–6 (4–4 ACC).

== Schedule ==
| Date | Opponent | Rank | Site | TV | Result | Attendance | Source |
|---|---|---|---|---|---|---|---|
| September 12 | Western Carolina* | No. 24 | Bobby Dodd Stadium; Atlanta, GA | | W 37–19 | 41,911 | |
| September 19 | at No. 20 Virginia | No. 22 | Scott Stadium; Charlottesville, VA | | L 24–55 | 42,100 | |
| September 26 | No. 16 Clemson | | Bobby Dodd Stadium; Atlanta, GA (rivalry) | ESPN | W 20–16 | 46,033 | |
| October 3 | No. 21 NC State | No. 23 | Bobby Dodd Stadium; Atlanta, GA | Raycom | W 16–13 | 40,761 | |
| October 10 | at Maryland | No. 17 | Byrd Stadium; College Park, MD | | W 28–26 | 26,250 | |
| October 17 | No. 6 Florida State | No. 16 | Bobby Dodd Stadium; Atlanta, GA | ESPN | L 24–29 | 46,226 | |
| October 24 | at North Carolina | No. 19 | Kenan Memorial Stadium; Chapel Hill, NC | ABC | L 14–26 | 52,800 | |
| October 31 | Duke^{†} | | Bobby Dodd Stadium; Atlanta, GA | Raycom | W 20–17 | 44,129 | |
| November 7 | at Baylor* | | Floyd Casey Stadium; Waco, TX | | L 27–31 | 38,213 | |
| November 14 | Wake Forest | | Bobby Dodd Stadium; Atlanta, GA | | L 10–23 | 40,006 | |
| November 28 | at No. 9 Georgia* | | Sanford Stadium; Athens, GA (Clean, Old-Fashioned Hate) | ESPN | L 17–31 | 85,434 | |
*Non-conference game; ^{†}Homecoming; Rankings from AP Poll released prior to the game

== Roster ==
1992 Georgia Tech Yellow Jackets football team roster
Players
Coaches
Offense

| Pos. | # | Name | Class |
|---|---|---|---|
| RB | 36 | William Bell | Jr |
| QB | 10 | Shawn Jones | Sr |

Defense

| Pos. | # | Name | Class |

Special teams

| Pos. | # | Name | Class |
|---|---|---|---|
| K | 9 | Scott Sisson | Sr |

Head coach

- Bill Lewis

Coordinators/assistant coaches

- Steve Shankweiler – Offensive coordinator/offensive line
- Rusty Burns – Quarterbacks
- Greg Nord – Running backs
- Danny Smith – Wide receivers/assistant head coach
- Marty Galbraith – Offensive tackles/tight ends
- Mike Cassity – Defensive coordinator/defensive backs
- Cary Godette – Defensive line
- Brian Baker – Outside linebacker
- Dave Huxtable – Inside linebacker

Legend

- (C) Team captain
- (S) Suspended
- (I) Ineligible
- Injured
- Redshirt
