= 1992 Maryland Terrapins football team =

American college football season

1992 Maryland Terrapins football
- Conference: Atlantic Coast Conference
- Record: 3–8 (2–6 ACC)
- Head coach: Mark Duffner (1st season)
- Offensive coordinator: Dan Dorazio (1st season)
- Offensive scheme: Run and shoot
- Defensive coordinator: Larry Slade (1st season)
- Base defense: 4–3
- Home stadium: Byrd Stadium

1992 Atlantic Coast Conference football standings
	Conf.					Overall
Team	W		L		T	W		L		T
No. 2 Florida State $	8	–	0	–	0	11	–	1	–	0
No. 17 NC State	6	–	2	–	0	9	–	3	–	1
No. 19 North Carolina	5	–	3	–	0	9	–	3	–	0
No. 25 Wake Forest	4	–	4	–	0	8	–	4	–	0
Virginia	4	–	4	–	0	7	–	4	–	0
Georgia Tech	4	–	4	–	0	5	–	6	–	0
Clemson	3	–	5	–	0	5	–	6	–	0
Maryland	2	–	6	–	0	3	–	8	–	0
Duke	0	–	8	–	0	2	–	9	–	0
$ – Conference champion; Rankings from AP Poll

The 1992 Maryland Terrapins football team represented the University of Maryland in the 1992 NCAA Division I-A football season. In their first season under head coach Mark Duffner, the Terrapins compiled a 3–8 record, finished in eighth place in the Atlantic Coast Conference, and were outscored by their opponents 365 to 292. The team's statistical leaders included John Kaleo with 3,392 passing yards, Mark Mason with 523 rushing yards, and Marcus Badgett with 1,240 receiving yards.

== Schedule ==
Date	Opponent	Site	TV	Result	Attendance	Source
September 5	at No. 25 Virginia	Scott Stadium; Charlottesville, VA (rivalry)		L 15–28	44,400	
September 12	No. 19 NC State	Byrd Stadium; College Park, MD		L 10–14	27,550	
September 19	at West Virginia*	Mountaineer Field; Morgantown, WV (rivalry)		L 33–34	55,727	
September 26	at No. 9 Penn State*	Beaver Stadium; University Park, PA (rivalry)		L 13–49	95,891	
October 3	Pittsburgh*	Byrd Stadium; College Park, MD		W 47–34	35,891	
October 10	No. 17 Georgia Tech	Byrd Stadium; College Park, MD		L 26–28	26,250	
October 17	Wake Forest	Byrd Stadium; College Park, MD		L 23–30	31,132	
October 24	at Duke	Wallace Wade Stadium; Durham, NC		W 27–25	17,850	
October 31	No. 22 North Carolina	Byrd Stadium; College Park, MD		L 24–31	22,099	
November 7	at No. 6 Florida State	Doak Campbell Stadium; Tallahassee, FL	JPS	L 21–69	64,127	
November 14	Clemson	Byrd Stadium; College Park, MD	JPS	W 53–23	25,223	
*Non-conference game; Rankings from AP Poll released prior to the game

== Roster ==
1992 Maryland Terrapins football team roster
Players
Coaches
Offense

Pos.	#	Name	Class
WR	4	Jermaine Lewis	Fr
QB	13	Scott Milanovich	Fr
TE	22	Frank Wycheck	Sr

Defense

Pos.	#	Name	Class
DT	51	Joe Bergstorm	Jr
DB	9	Gene Green	So

Special teams

Pos.	#	Name	Class

Head coach

- Mark Duffner

Coordinators/assistant coaches

Legend

- (C) Team captain
- (S) Suspended
- (I) Ineligible
- Injured
- Redshirt
