= Marc Verica =

American football player (born 1988)

No. 6
- Position: Quarterback

Personal information
- Born: March 26, 1988 (age 38); Philadelphia, Pennsylvania, U.S.
- Listed height: 6 ft 3 in (1.91 m)
- Listed weight: 206 lb (93 kg)

Career information
- College: Virginia (2006–2010)
- NFL draft: 2011: undrafted

Career history
- Washington Redskins (2011)*; Cougars de Saint-Ouen l'Aumône, France (2012–2013)
- * Offseason or practice squad member only

Marc Verica (born March 26, 1988) is an American former football quarterback who played for Cougars de Saint-Ouen l'Aumône in the Division 1 Elite Championship (D1). He played college football for the Virginia Cavaliers.

== Early life ==
Marc Verica attended Monsignor Bonner High School in Drexel Hill, a suburb of Philadelphia. As a senior, he completed 81 of 160 passes for 899 yards and three touchdowns in nine games; he missed two games due to an injury and his team lost both. As a junior, he completed 112 passes in 222 attempts for 1,545 yards and eight touchdowns. Verica was named to league, county, and city all-star teams as a junior. His position coach in high school previously had coached former Cavalier quarterback Matt Schaub. In addition to Virginia, Verica was offered a scholarship by Wisconsin.

== College career ==
Verica was a redshirt as a true freshman in 2006. He also did not play as a redshirt freshman in the 2007 season when he was behind starter Jameel Sewell and backup Peter Lalich. Prior to the 2008 season, Verica competed with Lalich and fifth year senior Scott Deke for the starting quarterback job after Sewell became academically ineligible. Verica lost the competition to Lalich but beat out Deke for the backup position. Verica saw his first action in college late in the game against the USC Trojans in the Cavaliers' first game of the 2008 season. Verica did not play in the next game against the Richmond Spiders.

On September 10, 2008, it was announced through a statement from Virginia's sports information office that Lalich would not be starting in the September 13 game against the Connecticut Huskies. Verica made his debut as starter in a game the Cavaliers lost 45–10. He completed 22 of 30 passes for 158 yards with no touchdowns and one interception before being relieved by Deke in the fourth quarter. When Lalich was dismissed from the football team the following week, Verica became the starting quarterback. Verica led the Cavaliers to four straight wins during October and catapulted the Cavaliers into first place in the ACC Coastal Division. However, in November, the Cavaliers lost all four of their games to finish the season 5–7. In the season finale against the Virginia Tech Hokies, cornerback Vic Hall moved to quarterback for most snaps as the Cavaliers employed the wildcat formation though Verica returned for downs requiring a pass.

Verica competed with Sewell and Hall for the starting quarterback position in 2009, however Sewell emerged as the primary starter. Verica received playing time in several games and started against the Miami Hurricanes when Sewell sat out due to injury.

Verica competed with redshirt freshman Ross Metheny for the starting quarterback position in the 2010 season, ultimately winning. Verica led the Cavaliers to a 4–8 record, starting all 12 games. Metheny and true freshman Michael Rocco received limited playing time in relief of Verica during the 2010 season.

== Professional career ==
After the 2011 NFL draft, Verica was signed by the Washington Redskins as an undrafted free agent.

In 2011, Verica signed with French franchise Cougars de Saint-Ouen l'Aumône. The Cougars played in the highest level of competition in France (Division 1).
