= 1992 North Carolina Tar Heels football team =

American college football season

1992 North Carolina Tar Heels football

Peach Bowl, W 21–17 vs Mississippi State
- Conference: Atlantic Coast Conference

Ranking
- Coaches: No. 18
- AP: No. 19
- Record: 9–3 (5–3 ACC)
- Head coach: Mack Brown (5th season)
- Offensive scheme: Multiple
- Defensive coordinator: Carl Torbush (5th season)
- Base defense: 4–3
- Captains: Corey Holliday; Randall Parsons; Jonathan Perry; Tommy Thigpen
- Home stadium: Kenan Memorial Stadium

1992 Atlantic Coast Conference football standings
	Conf.					Overall
Team	W		L		T	W		L		T
No. 2 Florida State $	8	–	0	–	0	11	–	1	–	0
No. 17 NC State	6	–	2	–	0	9	–	3	–	1
No. 19 North Carolina	5	–	3	–	0	9	–	3	–	0
No. 25 Wake Forest	4	–	4	–	0	8	–	4	–	0
Virginia	4	–	4	–	0	7	–	4	–	0
Georgia Tech	4	–	4	–	0	5	–	6	–	0
Clemson	3	–	5	–	0	5	–	6	–	0
Maryland	2	–	6	–	0	3	–	8	–	0
Duke	0	–	8	–	0	2	–	9	–	0
$ – Conference champion; Rankings from AP Poll

The 1992 North Carolina Tar Heels football team represented the University of North Carolina at Chapel Hill during the 1992 NCAA Division I-A football season. The Tar Heels played their home games at Kenan Memorial Stadium in Chapel Hill, North Carolina and competed in the Atlantic Coast Conference. The team was led by head coach Mack Brown.

== Schedule ==
Date	Time	Opponent	Rank	Site	TV	Result	Attendance	Source
September 5	12:10 p.m.	at Wake Forest		Groves Stadium; Winston-Salem, NC (rivalry)	JPS	W 35–17	23,447	
September 12	7:00 p.m.	Furman*		Kenan Memorial Stadium; Chapel Hill, NC		W 28–0	48,500	
September 19	7:00 p.m.	Army*		Kenan Memorial Stadium; Chapel Hill, NC		W 22–9	40,500	
September 26	12:10 p.m.	No. 23 NC State		Kenan Memorial Stadium; Chapel Hill, NC (rivalry)		L 20–27	53,725	
October 3	1:30 p.m.	Navy*		Kenan Memorial Stadium; Chapel Hill, NC		W 28–14	42,000	
October 10	12:10 p.m.	at No. 8 Florida State		Doak Campbell Stadium; Tallahassee, FL	JPS	L 13–36	60,553	
October 17	12:10 p.m.	No. 17 Virginia		Kenan Memorial Stadium; Chapel Hill, NC (South's Oldest Rivalry)		W 27–7	45,500	
October 24	3:30 p.m.	No. 19 Georgia Tech		Kenan Memorial Stadium; Chapel Hill, NC	ABC	W 26–14	52,800	
October 31	1:30 p.m.	at Maryland	No. 22	Byrd Stadium; College Park, MD		W 31–24	22,099	
November 7	1:00 p.m.	at Clemson	No. 18	Memorial Stadium; Clemson, SC		L 7–40	78,000	
November 21	12:10 p.m.	at Duke	No. 21	Wallace Wade Stadium; Durham, NC (Victory Bell)		W 31–28	28,680	
January 2, 1993	8:00 p.m.	vs. No. 24 Mississippi State*	No. 19	Georgia Dome; Atlanta, GA (Peach Bowl)	ESPN	W 21–17	69,125	
*Non-conference game; Rankings from AP Poll released prior to the game; All times are in Eastern time

== Roster ==
1992 North Carolina Tar Heels football team roster
Players
Coaches
Offense

Pos.	#	Name	Class
WR	1	Corey Holliday	Jr
WR	7	Bucky Brooks	Jr
RB	20	Natrone Means	Jr
FB	33	William Henderson	So
FB	34	Mike Faulkerson	Sr
OT	64	Ethan Albright	Jr
TE	85	Greg DeLong	So

Defense

Pos.	#	Name	Class
DB	18	Jimmy Hitchcock	So
LB	24	Bernardo Harris	Jr
DB	29	Thomas Smith	Sr
OLB	41	Ray Jacobs	Jr
LB	82	Mike Morton	So
DT	97	Riddick Parker	Jr

Special teams

Pos.	#	Name	Class
DS	68	Stu Holt	So

Head coach

- Mack Brown

Coordinators/assistant coaches

Legend

- (C) Team captain
- (S) Suspended
- (I) Ineligible
- Injured
- Redshirt

Roster
