= North Forsyth High School (North Carolina) =

American public school in North Carolina

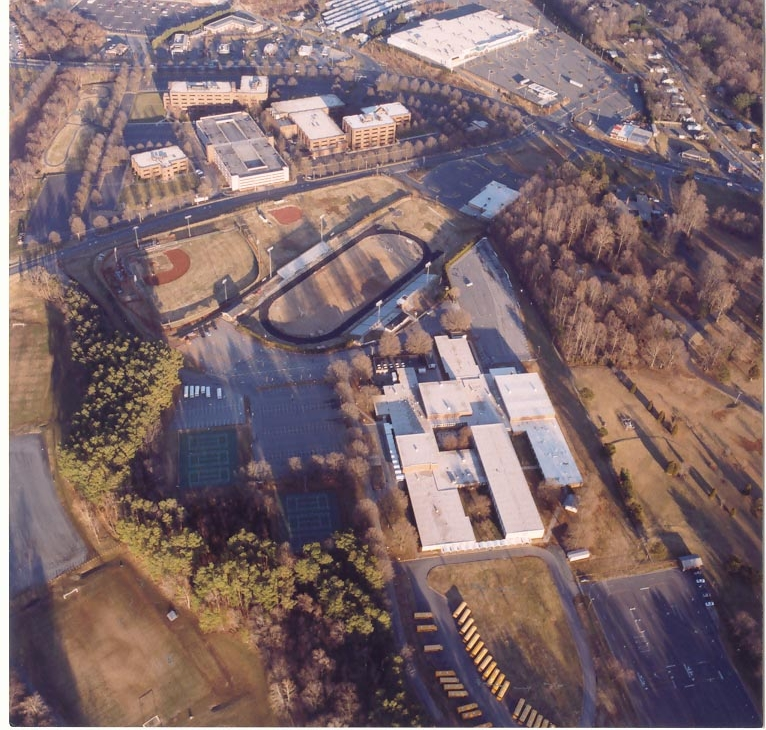
- Aerial view of North Forsyth High School in 2004

Location
- 5705 Shattalon Drive; Winston-Salem, North Carolina 27105; United States; 36°10′26″N 80°16′54″W

Information
- Type: Public
- Opened: 1963 (63 years ago)
- School district: Winston-Salem/Forsyth County Schools
- Superintendent: Tricia McManus
- CEEB code: 344440
- Principal: Bridget Hayes
- Teaching staff: 73.30 (FTE)
- Grades: 9–12
- Enrollment: 1,111 (2023–2024)
- Student to teacher ratio: 15.16
- Colors: Crimson, white, and Columbia blue
- Athletics: Football, Soccer (boys & girls), Volleyball, Cross Country (boys & girls), Tennis (boys & girls), Indoor Track & Field (boys & girls), Basketball (boys & girls), Wrestling, Swimming (boys & girls), Outdoor Track & Field (boys & girls), Golf (boys & girls), Baseball, Softball, Cheerleading (co-ed)
- Mascot: Vikings
- Newspaper: The Norland
- Yearbook: Cynosure
- Website: wsfcs.k12.nc.us/wsfcs

North Forsyth High School is located in Winston-Salem, North Carolina, US. There are about 1,300 students in grades 9 through 12. The motto of the school is "learning together, now and forever". The mascot is a Viking. The school colors are Crimson, White, & Columbia Blue.

== Academics ==
North Forsyth offers Honors, Seminar, and Advanced Placement courses. In April 2007, North Forsyth went through an extensive re-accreditation process and was re-accredited by the Southern Association of Colleges and Schools (SACS). North Forsyth was also one of the four high schools in the Winston-Salem/Forsyth County School system to meet, at a rate of 100%, the yearly AYP (Average Yearly Progress) for the 2006–2007 school year. Former principal Ron Jessup, announced his retirement in March 2009. Jessup took over as principal in November 1996. His last day as principal was June 30, 2009. His successor, David C. Burleson, was the former superintendent of Burke County Schools. He acquired the position of principal after his superintendent's contract was terminated by the Burke County Board of Education. In early June 2010, David Burleson was elevated to Assistant Superintendent for High Schools in WSFCS. Rodney Bass, former social studies teacher and assistant coach was then named North Forsyth's 6th principal. In 2015, Bass became principal of East Forsyth High School. Melita Wise, former principal of Hanes Magnet School, was named as principal.

== Athletics/extracurricular activities ==
North Forsyth High School has many clubs ranging from the drama Club to the outdoors club. North Forsyth boasts a successful visual and performing arts program, concert band, jazz program and marching band, concert choirs, indoor percussion/winter guard units and is home to a branch of the Air Force JROTC.

Sports at North Forsyth High include: Football, Volleyball, Cross Country, Tennis, Golf, Soccer, Indoor Track & Field, Swimming, Wrestling, Outdoor Track & Field, Baseball, Softball, Cheerleading, and the Valkyrie Dance Team.

=== State Championships ===
North Forsyth has won the following North Carolina High School Athletic Association (NCHSAA) team state championships:

- Football: 1971 (4A)
- Women's Indoor Track & Field: 1994 (All Classes), 1995 (All Classes)
- Women's Outdoor Track & Field: 1994 (4A)

== Principals ==
North Forsyth has been under the direction of only seven principals since the school opened in 1963. Julian Gibson was the founding principal. Upon Gibson's retirement in the mid-1980s, Ben Warren served as principal. Kaye Shutt then acted as principal until the fall of 1996. Ron Jessup served as principal from Nov. 1996 until June 30, 2009. David C. Burleson was approved by the WS/FCS Board of Education on July 9, 2009, to be the fifth principal in the long history of the school. Burleson served as principal for one year before being promoted to Assistant Superintendent for High Schools. Rodney Bass, a former social studies teacher and coach, was named North Forsyth's sixth principal in early June 2010. Melita Wise became principal in 2015. At the beginning of 2023, Melita Wise retired and Bridget Hayes was appointed principal on January 3, 2023.

== Rivals ==
North Forsyth holds rivalries with several schools. Nearby Mount Tabor High School has served as the chief rivalry for a majority of the past 25 years. The Vikings also carry a rivalry with Carver High School. Competition with R.J. Reynolds High School is the longest-running rivalry in Forsyth County. The newly formed rivalry between North Forsyth and Reagan has developed into one of the highly anticipated in the county.

== Rivalry games ==
The Battle for the Page Cup
In 2005, North Forsyth and Mt. Tabor started battling for the Page Cup. The nearly 4-foot-tall (1.2 m) trophy was donated by North Forsyth alumnus Bill Page, former owner of Page's Gifts & Awards in Winston-Salem. The trophy features base plates with the year and victor's name. The trophy goes to the yearly winner of the Vikings vs. Spartans football matchup. Mt. Tabor won the inaugural "Cup Game" and leads the Cup Game series 7–1, including six straight.

The Hammer Bowl
Beginning in 2010, Reagan and North Forsyth began play for "The Hammer". The second traveling trophy in which North Forsyth competes is a standard 10 lb. sledge hammer. The hammer goes to the annual winner of the North Forsyth-Reagan football game, which has been renamed "The Hammer Bowl". Each team's colors and logos are on opposite sides of the hammer. Reagan's side features their gothic R logo painted in black on a silver background, outlined in teal. North Forsyth's side features the Georgian block NF logo painted in Columbia blue and outlined in white. The logo is painted on a Crimson background.
The winner of the game gets to paint the year of the win on their side of the handle. The winning school will also display the hammer until the two teams meet in football again, including any potential playoff games.

== Social media ==
North Forsyth publicizes its events using Facebook and Twitter, while its Sports & Entertainment Marketing classes manage a YouTube channel for the school and its athletic program.

== Notable alumni ==
- Dustin Ackley — MLB second baseman and outfielder
- Angelo Crowell — NFL linebacker
- Germane Crowell — NFL wide receiver; older brother of Angelo Crowell
- Brian Howard — professional basketball player
- Bill Jackson — NFL defensive back
- D. J. Mitchell — MLB pitcher
- Darrell Nicholson — former NFL and Canadian Football League linebacker
