= 1992 Duke Blue Devils football team =

American college football season

1992 Duke Blue Devils football
- Conference: Atlantic Coast Conference
- Record: 2–9 (0–8 ACC)
- Head coach: Barry Wilson (3rd season)
- Offensive coordinator: Eddie Wilson (3rd season)
- Defensive coordinator: Dale Strahm (3rd season)
- MVPs: Randy Cuthbert; Scott Berdan
- Captains: Darrell Spells; Randy Cuthbert
- Home stadium: Wallace Wade Stadium

1992 Atlantic Coast Conference football standings
	Conf.					Overall
Team	W		L		T	W		L		T
No. 2 Florida State $	8	–	0	–	0	11	–	1	–	0
No. 17 NC State	6	–	2	–	0	9	–	3	–	1
No. 19 North Carolina	5	–	3	–	0	9	–	3	–	0
No. 25 Wake Forest	4	–	4	–	0	8	–	4	–	0
Virginia	4	–	4	–	0	7	–	4	–	0
Georgia Tech	4	–	4	–	0	5	–	6	–	0
Clemson	3	–	5	–	0	5	–	6	–	0
Maryland	2	–	6	–	0	3	–	8	–	0
Duke	0	–	8	–	0	2	–	9	–	0
$ – Conference champion; Rankings from AP Poll

The 1992 Duke Blue Devils football team represented Duke University as a member of the Atlantic Coast Conference (ACC) during the 1992 NCAA Division I-A football season. Led by third-year head coach Barry Wilson, the Blue Devils compiled an overall record of 2–9 with a mark of 0–8 in conference play, and finished ninth in the ACC. Duke played home games at Wallace Wade Stadium in Durham, North Carolina.

== Schedule ==
Date	Time	Opponent	Site	TV	Result	Attendance	Source
September 5	7:00 p.m.	at No. 4 Florida State	Doak Campbell Stadium; Tallahassee, FL	PPV	L 21–48	60,751	
September 12		at Vanderbilt*	Vanderbilt Stadium; Nashville, TN		L 37–42	40,031	
September 19		Rice*	Wallace Wade Stadium; Durham, NC		W 17–12	11,400	
September 26		No. 14 Virginia	Wallace Wade Stadium; Durham, NC		L 28–55	24,400	
October 10	1:30 p.m.	East Carolina*	Wallace Wade Stadium; Durham, NC		W 45–14	34,100	
October 17	1:00 p.m.	at No. 19 Clemson	Memorial Stadium; Clemson, SC		L 6–21	77,532	
October 24		Maryland^{†}	Wallace Wade Stadium; Durham, NC		L 25–27	17,850	
October 31		at Georgia Tech	Bobby Dodd Stadium; Atlanta, GA	Raycom	L 17–20	44,129	
November 7	1:30 p.m.	Wake Forest	Wallace Wade Stadium; Durham, NC (rivalry)		L 14–28	33,600	
November 14		at No. 14 NC State	Carter–Finley Stadium; Raleigh, NC (rivalry)		L 27–45	46,350	
November 21		No. 21 North Carolina	Wallace Wade Stadium; Durham, NC (Victory Bell)		L 28–31	28,680	
*Non-conference game; ^{†}Homecoming; Rankings from AP Poll released prior to the game; All times are in Eastern time
