= 1993 Peach Bowl (January) =

American college football game

- 25th Peach Bowl
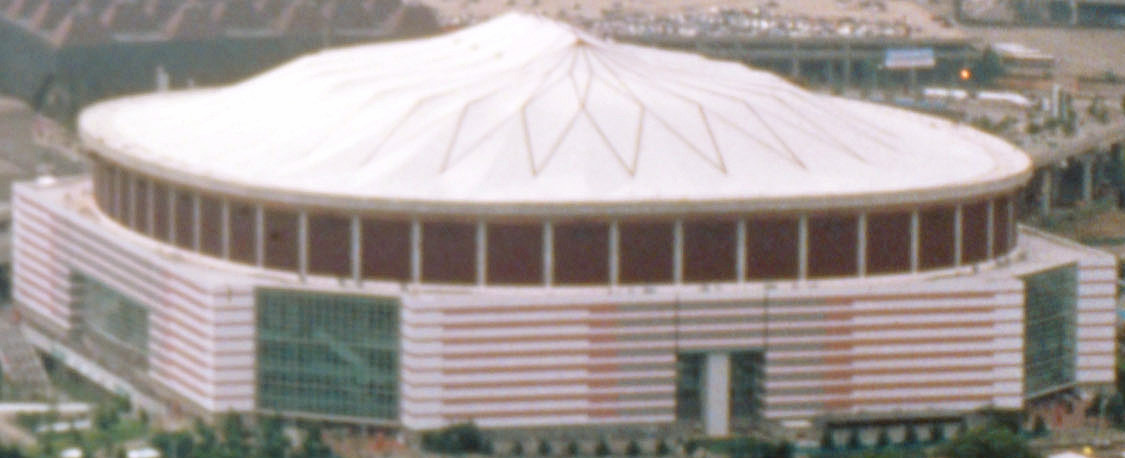
- The Georgia Dome in Atlanta, Georgia, hosted the Peach Bowl.
Mississippi State Bulldogs	North Carolina Tar Heels
(7–4)	(8–3)
SEC	ACC
17	21
Head coach: Jackie Sherrill	Head coach: Mack Brown
AP / Coaches / BC; 24 / NR / 25	AP / Coaches / BC; 19 / 20 / 20
	1	2	3	4	Total
Mississippi State	14	0	0	3	17
North Carolina	0	0	14	7	21
- Date: January 2, 1993
- Season: 1992
- Stadium: Georgia Dome
- Location: Atlanta, Georgia
- MVP: Offense: RB Natrone Means, UNC; Defense: DB Bracey Walker, UNC
- Referee: Richard Honig (Big Ten)
- Attendance: 69,125

The 1993 Peach Bowl, part of the 1992–93 bowl game season, featured the Mississippi State Bulldogs and the North Carolina Tar Heels. It was the first Peach Bowl played at the Georgia Dome after 20 years at Atlanta–Fulton County Stadium.

North Carolina came from behind for the win after trailing 14–0 after a quarter of play. Mississippi State missed chances to extend its lead in the second quarter when two touchdowns were scuttled by holding penalties. The Tar Heels then drove 82 yards to open the second half and Natrone Means pounded in the score, UNC's only offensive touchdown of the day. Means finished with 128 yards.

Bracey Walker blocked two punts, including one for a 24-yard scoring return that tied the game at 14 in the third quarter. The defensive MVP also laid a big hit to key a 44-yard interception return by teammate Cliff Baskervillle for the go-ahead TD in the fourth quarter. MSU added a late field goal, but turned the ball over via interception and downs inside the Tar Heels' 30 on two late drives.
