= Darius Jennings =

American football player (born 1992)

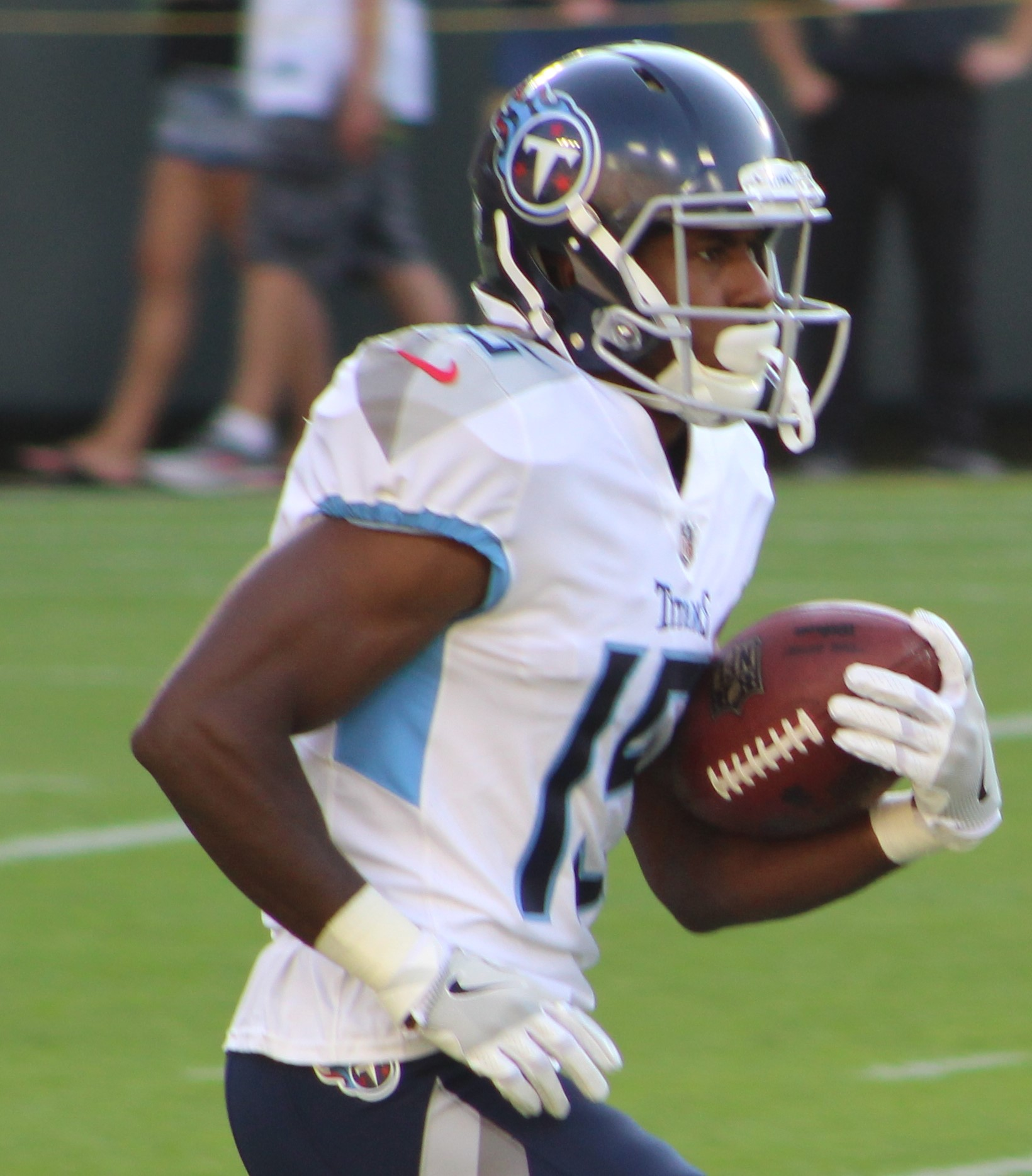
- Jennings with the Tennessee Titans in 2018

No. 10, 15
- Positions: Wide receiver, return specialist

Personal information
- Born: June 28, 1992 (age 34); Baltimore, Maryland, U.S.
- Listed height: 5 ft 10 in (1.78 m)
- Listed weight: 180 lb (82 kg)

Career information
- High school: Gilman School (Baltimore)
- College: Virginia
- NFL draft: 2015: undrafted

Career history
- Cleveland Browns (2015–2016); Chicago Bears (2016)*; New York Jets (2016–2017)*; Tennessee Titans (2017–2019); Los Angeles Chargers (2020)*; Detroit Lions (2021)*
- * Offseason or practice squad member only

Career NFL statistics
- Receptions: 27
- Receiving yards: 235
- Return yards: 1,052
- Total touchdowns: 1
- Stats at Pro Football Reference

Darius Lamar Jennings (born June 28, 1992) is an American former professional football player who was a wide receiver and return specialist in the National Football League (NFL). He played college football for the Virginia Cavaliers and signed with Cleveland Browns as an undrafted free agent in 2015. Jennings was also a member of the Chicago Bears, New York Jets, Tennessee Titans, Los Angeles Chargers, and Detroit Lions.

== Early life ==
Darius Lamar Jennings was born on June 28, 1992, to Lawrence and Dana Jennings, in Baltimore, Maryland. He attended and played high school football at the Gilman School while also lettering in basketball and track.

== College career ==
Jennings finished his collegiate career with 133 receptions for 1,667 yards and 11 touchdowns in 49 games and 28 starts. He ranked #1 all-time in kick return yards with 1,839.

Jennings majored in sociology.

== Professional career ==
=== Cleveland Browns ===
==== 2015 season ====
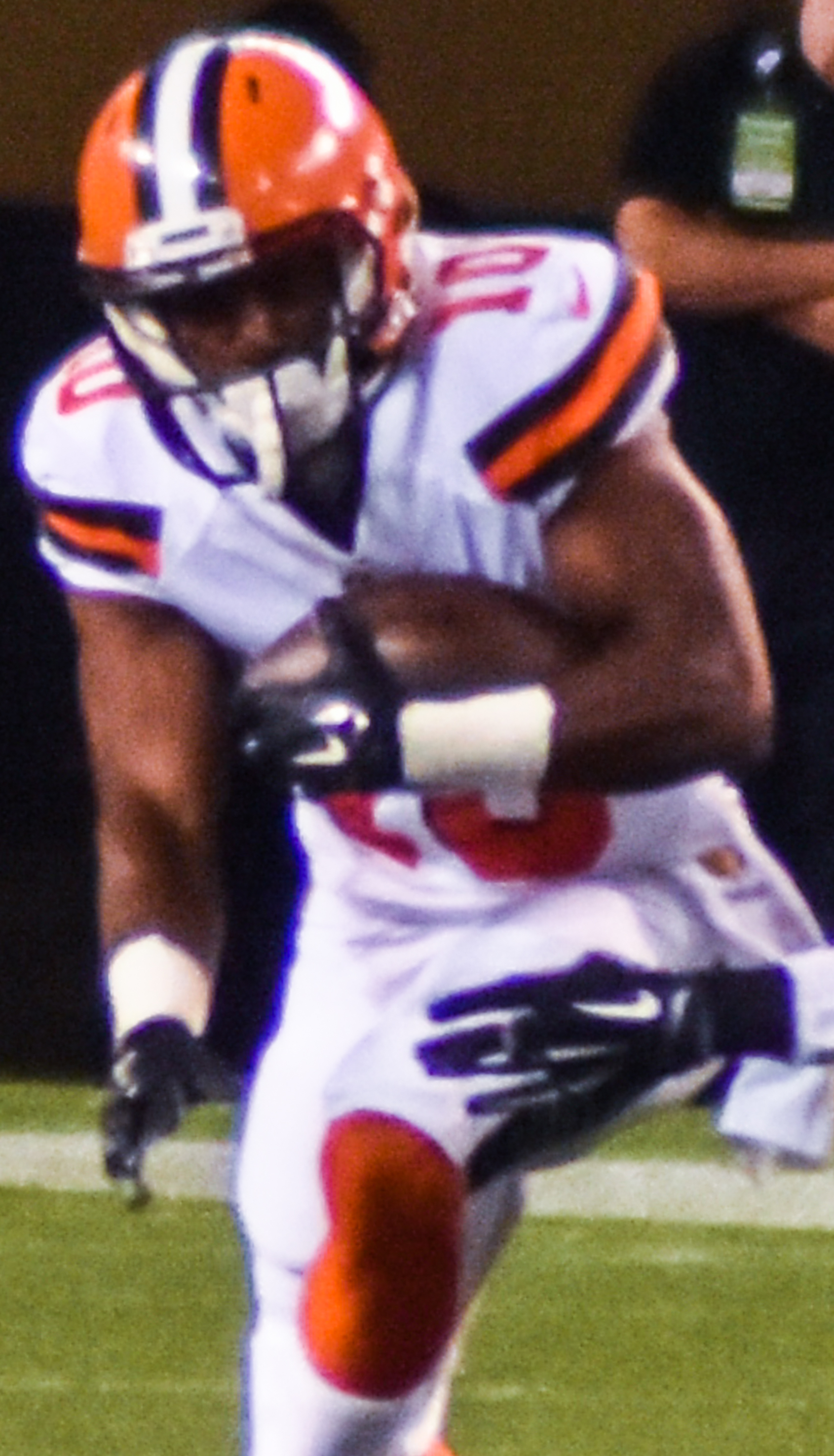
Jennings in 2015

Jennings signed with the Cleveland Browns as an undrafted free agent in May 2015. He started the season on the practice squad and was promoted to the active roster in early December. Jennings was waived by the Browns on December 16, but was re-signed six days later.

Jennings finished his rookie year with 14 receptions for 117 yards to go along with seven returns for 158 yards in four games and one start.

==== 2016 season ====
On April 4, 2016, the Browns re-signed Jennings. He was released on September 3, but was signed to the practice squad the next day. Jennings was released again on October 6.

=== Chicago Bears ===
On October 10, 2016, Jennings was signed to the Chicago Bears' practice squad. He was released on November 22.

=== New York Jets ===
On December 6, 2016, Jennings was signed to the New York Jets' practice squad. He signed a reserve/future contract on January 2, 2017. On April 26, Jennings was waived by the Jets.

=== Tennessee Titans ===
==== 2017 season ====
On May 19, 2017, Jennings signed with the Tennessee Titans. He was waived on September 2, and was signed to the practice squad the next day. Jennings was promoted to the active roster on September 23. He was waived again on November 25, and was re-signed to the practice squad three days later.

==== 2018 season ====
Jennings signed a reserve/future contract with the Titans on January 15, 2018.

During the season-opener against the Miami Dolphins, Jennings scored his first NFL touchdown after returning a 94-yard kickoff return in the fourth quarter of the 27–20 road loss. During a Week 9 28–14 road victory over the Dallas Cowboys, Jennings had a 36-yard reception despite three defenders around him in the second quarter to go along with 23 return yards. In the next game against the New England Patriots, Jennings returned the opening kickoff for 58 yards and recorded a 21-yard pass completion to quarterback Marcus Mariota, the first of his career, during the 34–10 victory.

Jennings finished the 2018 season with 22 returns for 698 yards and a touchdown to go along with 11 receptions for 101 yards and a two-yard rush in 16 games and no starts. His 31.7 yards set a franchise record for average kickoff returns that also led the NFL.

==== 2019 season ====
Jennings was released by the Titans on October 31, 2019. Prior to his release, Jennings caught two passes for 17 yards and returned seven kicks for 147 yards. He was re-signed on December 23. In the regular-season finale against the Houston Texans, Jennings returned two kicks for 49 yards.

In the postseason, Jennings returned three kicks for 60 yards before the Titans lost to the Kansas City Chiefs in the AFC Championship Game by a score of 35–24.

=== Los Angeles Chargers ===
On March 30, 2020, Jennings was signed by the Los Angeles Chargers. He was released on September 5.

=== Detroit Lions ===
On August 9, 2021, Jennings signed with the Detroit Lions. He was released on August 23.

== Career statistics ==
=== NFL ===
Legend
	Led the league
**Bold**	Career-high

==== Regular season ====
Year	Team	Games		Receiving					Rushing					Returning					Fumbles	
Year	Team	GP	GS	Rec	Yds	Avg	Lng	TD	Att	Yds	Avg	Lng	TD	Ret	Yds	Avg	Lng	TD	Fum	Lost
2015	CLE	4	**1**	**14**	**117**	8.4	16	0	0	0	0.0	0	0	7	158	22.6	28	0	**1**	0
2018	TEN	**16**	0	11	101	**9.2**	**36**	0	**1**	**2**	**2.0**	**2**	0	**22**	**698**	**31.7**	**94T**	**1**	0	0
2019	TEN	8	0	2	17	8.5	11	0	0	0	0.0	0	0	9	196	21.8	26	0	0	0
Career		27	1	27	235	8.7	36	0	1	2	2.0	2	0	38	1,052	27.7	94T	1	1	0

==== Postseason ====
Year	Team	Games		Receiving					Rushing					Returning					Fumbles	
Year	Team	GP	GS	Rec	Yds	Avg	Lng	TD	Att	Yds	Avg	Lng	TD	Ret	Yds	Avg	Lng	TD	Fum	Lost
2019	TEN	2	0	0	0	0.0	0	0	0	0	0.0	0	0	3	60	20.0	22	0	0	0
Career		2	0	0	0	0.0	0	0	0	0	0.0	0	0	3	60	20.0	22	0	0	0

=== College ===
**Year**	**School**	**Conf**	**Class**	**Pos**	**G**	**Rec**	**Yds**	**Avg**	**TD**
2011	Virginia	ACC	FR	WR	13	20	238	11.9	1
2012	Virginia	ACC	SO	WR	12	48	568	11.8	5
2013	Virginia	ACC	JR	WR	12	38	340	8.9	3
2014	Virginia	ACC	SR	WR	12	27	521	19.3	2
**Career**						**133**	**1,667**	**12.5**	**11**

== Personal life ==
During the 2018 offseason, Jennings took part in the NFLPA's Externship Program with Events DC and Under Armour. He helps out with "Next One Up," an organization helping inner-city high school athletes in Baltimore. Jennings also worked as a camp counselor at his alma mater, The Gilman (Md.) School, helping middle schoolers with classwork and activities. He has two brothers, Dimitrius Jr. and Deon.
