= Connor Hughes (American football) =

American football player (born 1983)

No. 16
- Position: Placekicker

Personal information
- Born: October 4, 1983 (age 43); Newport News, Virginia, U.S.
- Listed height: 5 ft 10 in (1.78 m)
- Listed weight: 172 lb (78 kg)

Career information
- College: Virginia
- NFL draft: 2006: undrafted

Career history
- New Orleans Saints (2006)*; Pittsburgh Steelers (2007)*; Philadelphia Soul (2008); Dallas Cowboys (2010)*; Philadelphia Soul (2012)
- * Offseason or practice squad member only

Awards and highlights
- ArenaBowl champion (2008); AFL All-Rookie Team (2008); First-team All-ACC (2005); Second-team All-ACC (2003)

Career AFL statistics
- Field goals (%): 5–14 (35.7%)
- Extra points (%): 123–136 (90.4%)
- Tackles: 5
- Stats at ArenaFan.com

Connor Hughes (born October 4, 1983) is an American former football placekicker. He was signed by the New Orleans Saints as an undrafted free agent in 2006. He played college football at Virginia.

Hughes was also a member of the Pittsburgh Steelers, Philadelphia Soul, and Dallas Cowboys.
