= Donald E. Parker =

American psychologist (1936–2016)

Donald E. Parker (1936–2016) was an American experimental psychologist and academic. Parker was professor emeritus at Miami University in Ohio and an affiliate professor at the University of Washington.

== Biography ==
Parker was born in Chicago on April 6, 1936, and completed undergraduate education at DePauw University (B.A. (cum laude, 1958). He graduated with a Ph.D. in experimental psychology from Princeton University. He was a professor at the Human Interface Technology (HIT) Lab and in the Otolaryngology–Head and Neck Surgery Department at the University of Washington.

Parker was a Professor Emeritus at Miami University in Ohio and a member of the Barany Society, which he joined in 1980.

He retired from Miami University in 1993, and from the University of Washington in 2011. Parker died on January 17, 2016, in Seattle, Washington.
