= Germane Crowell =

American football player (born 1976)

No. 82
- Position: Wide receiver

Personal information
- Born: September 13, 1976 (age 50); Winston-Salem, North Carolina, U.S.
- Listed height: 6 ft 3 in (1.91 m)
- Listed weight: 213 lb (97 kg)

Career information
- High school: North Forsyth (Winston-Salem, North Carolina)
- College: Virginia
- NFL draft: 1998: 2nd round, 50th overall pick

Career history
- Detroit Lions (1998–2002); New Orleans Saints (2004)*
- * Offseason or practice squad member only

Career NFL statistics
- Receptions: 184
- Receiving yards: 2,722
- Receiving touchdowns: 16
- Stats at Pro Football Reference

Germane L. Crowell (born September 13, 1976) is an American former professional football player who was a wide receiver in the National Football League (NFL). In the 1998 NFL draft, Crowell was selected in the second round (50th overall) by the Detroit Lions. He played five seasons with the Lions from 1998 until 2002. He is the older brother of NFL linebacker Angelo Crowell.

== Early life ==
Crowell was born in Winston-Salem, North Carolina, the son of Patricia and Napoleon Crowell. He was one of six children and all five of his siblings, four brothers and one sister, played sports on the collegiate level.

During Crowell's years at North Forsyth High School, his head coach was former NFL wide receiver Drew Buie.

== College career ==
In 1994, Crowell decided to attend the University of Virginia, where he would go on to play football for four years (1994–1997). While playing Crowell lead the Cavaliers in both receiving yards and receptions during the 1996 and 1997 seasons. The 969 receiving yards gained during the 1997 season is the third best total all-time for a Cavalier, behind only Herman Moore and Billy McMullen. After Crowell's senior season his name rose high into the university's record book as he became 2nd in career receptions and 4th in career receiving yards. However, as of today he is 6th in both categories.

== Professional career ==
=== Detroit Lions ===
In 1998, Crowell was selected by the Detroit Lions in the second round, 50th overall. In March 2002, the Lions re-signed Crowell to a 3-year, $7.5 million contract with a $1 million signing bonus. In February 2003, the Lions released Crowell prior to a roster bonus which was due in March, however did not rule out re-signing him at a later date. His once promising Lions career ended following a wide assortment of injuries, resulting in him playing a full 16 games just once in his career, missing a total of 26 games over his five seasons in Detroit. He finished his Lions career having played in 54 games with 33 starts. He caught 184 passes for 2,722 yards and 16 touchdowns.

=== 2003 Free Agency ===
Following his release by the Lions in February 2003, Crowell had visits with the Miami Dolphins, as well as rumored interest by the Green Bay Packers and Minnesota Vikings, however he did not sign with any team for the 2003 season.

=== New Orleans Saints ===
In February 2004, Crowell signed a one-year contract with the Saints, where he was expected to battle for the third or fourth receiver position. Unfortunately, an injury to his right knee led to his being placed on the waived-injured list in August, thus effectively ending his pro career.

== Professional statistics ==
Year	Team	Games		Receiving					Rushing					Fumbles	
Year	Team	G	GS	Rec	Yds	Avg	Lng	TD	Att	Yds	Avg	Lng	TD	Fmb	Lst
1998	Detroit Lions	14	2	25	464	18.6	68T	3	1	35	35.0	35	0	1	1
1999	Detroit Lions	16	15	81	1,338	16.5	77T	7	5	38	7.6	20	0	1	1
2000	Detroit Lions	9	7	34	430	12.6	50T	3	1	12	12.0	12	0	0	0
2001	Detroit Lions	5	4	22	289	13.1	46T	2	1	6	6.0	6	0	1	0
2002	Detroit Lions	10	5	22	201	9.1	22	1	0	0	0.0	0	0	0	0
Career		54	33	184	2,722	14.8	77	16	8	91	11.4	35	1	3	2

== Personal life ==
Today, Crowell is still active in his hometown.
