= Michael Rocco =

American football quarterback

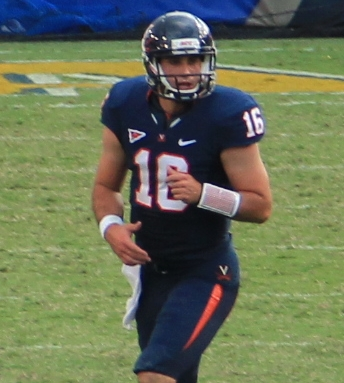

No. 2
- Position: Quarterback

Personal information
- Born: Lynchburg, Virginia, U.S.
- Listed height: 6 ft 3 in (1.91 m)
- Listed weight: 228 lb (103 kg)

Career information
- High school: Liberty Christian Academy (Lynchburg, Virginia)
- College: Virginia (2010–2012); Richmond (2013–2014)

Awards and highlights
- Nominee for the 2012 Allstate AFCA Good Works Team
- Stats at ESPN

Michael Rocco is an American former college football quarterback. He played college football for the Virginia Cavaliers and the University of Richmond Spiders football team. He became the starting quarterback at UVA in his sophomore year. After playing two seasons for the Cavaliers, he transferred to the University of Richmond. The NCAA denied a transfer exception, so he only played one season in Richmond.
