= Ryan Kuehl =

American football player (born 1972)

No. 78, 99, 97, 90
- Positions: Long snapper, defensive end

Personal information
- Born: January 18, 1972 (age 54); Washington, D.C., U.S.
- Listed height: 6 ft 5 in (1.96 m)
- Listed weight: 276 lb (125 kg)

Career information
- High school: Walt Whitman (Bethesda, Maryland)
- College: Virginia
- NFL draft: 1995: undrafted

Career history
- San Francisco 49ers (1995)*; Washington Redskins (1996–1997); Cleveland Browns (1999–2002); New York Giants (2003–2007)
- * Offseason or practice squad member only

Awards and highlights
- Super Bowl champion XLII); Second-team All-ACC (1994)

Career NFL statistics
- Games played: 126
- Total tackles: 33
- Stats at Pro Football Reference

Ryan Phillip Kuehl (born January 18, 1972) is an American former professional football player who was a long snapper in the National Football League (NFL). He played college football for the Virginia Cavaliers.

== Early life ==
Kuehl attended Walt Whitman High School in Bethesda, Maryland, where he was a prep All-American selection as a senior. One of Kuehl's notable high school achievements was scoring the Vikings' only playoff touchdown in nearly 20 years on a late game scoring strike from quarterback Andy Eichberg in the 1988 MD state playoff loss to the Randallstown Rams. It was the Vikings' only score that day.

Kuehl was a four-year letterman at the University of Virginia and was named second-team All-ACC at defensive tackle (1994).

== NFL career ==
- 1995: signed as free agent by the San Francisco 49ers ... released in 1996
- 1996: signed as free agent by the Washington Redskins ... waived 1998
- 1999: signed as free agent by the Cleveland Browns
- 2003: signed as unrestricted free agent by the New York Giants

Kuehl retired from the NFL after a ruptured Achilles' tendon during the 2007 preseason. Although he didn't play during the season, he earned a ring as a member of the Super Bowl XLII winning team.

== Post-NFL career ==
After football, Kuehl earned an MBA from American University and joined Under Armour in 2009. As vice president of sports marketing in sponsorships, he gave Jordan Spieth a ten-year deal with the company in 2015, replacing the company's original four-year contract from 2013.

Kuehl left Under Armour in 2018.
