= Angelo Crowell =

American football player (born 1981)

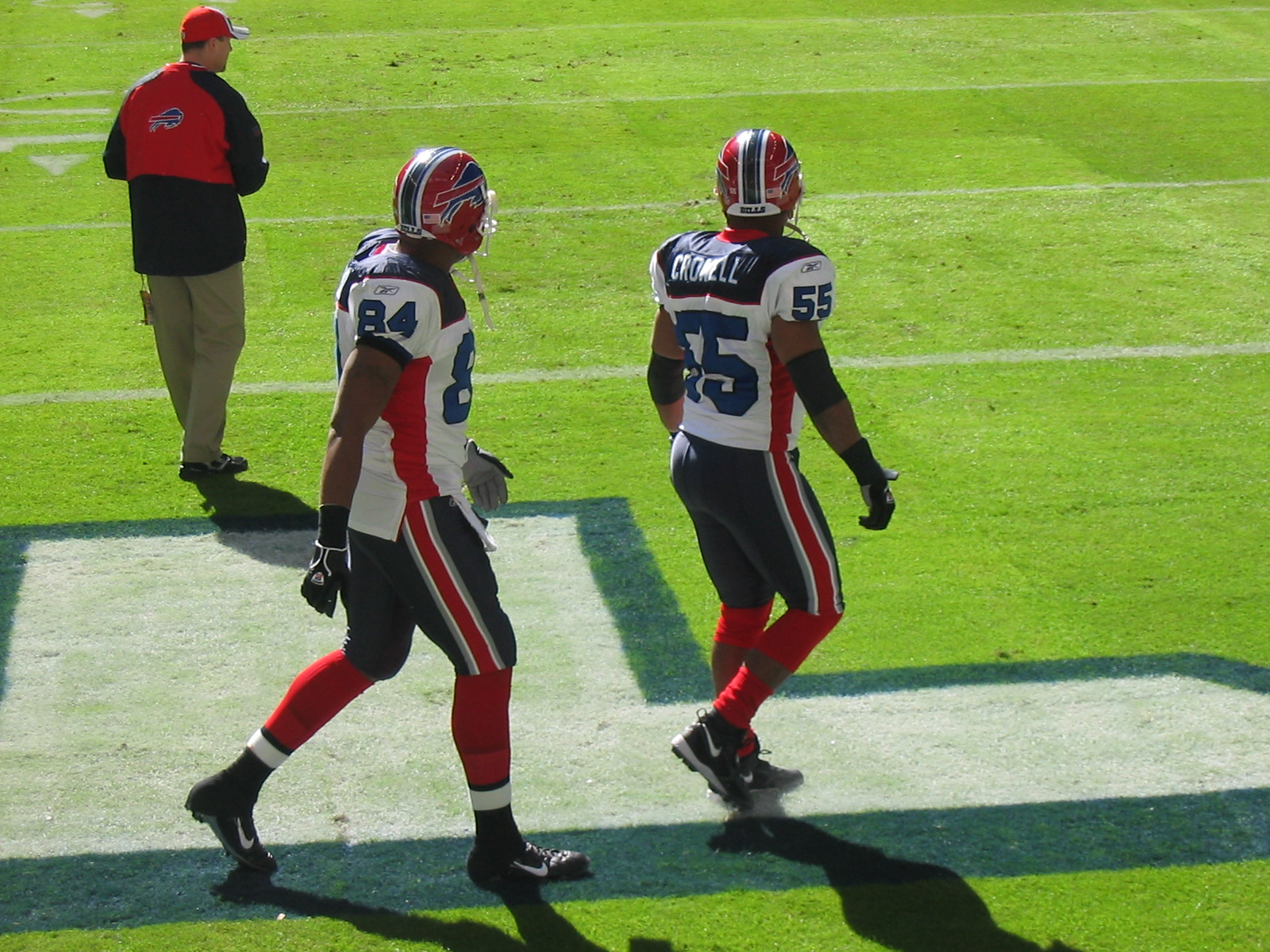
- Crowell (right) with Robert Royal in 2006

No. 55
- Position: Linebacker

Personal information
- Born: August 16, 1981 (age 45); Winston-Salem, North Carolina, U.S.
- Listed height: 6 ft 1 in (1.85 m)
- Listed weight: 246 lb (112 kg)

Career information
- High school: North Forsyth (Winston-Salem)
- College: Virginia
- NFL draft: 2003: 3rd round, 94th overall pick

Career history
- Buffalo Bills (2003–2008); Tampa Bay Buccaneers (2009); Omaha Nighthawks (2011–2012)

Awards and highlights
- First-team All-ACC (2002); Second-team All-ACC (2001)

Career NFL statistics
- Total tackles: 343
- Sacks: 7
- Forced fumbles: 4
- Fumble recoveries: 1
- Interceptions: 5
- Stats at Pro Football Reference

Angelo Delvonne Crowell (born August 16, 1981) is an American former professional football player who was a linebacker in the National Football League (NFL). He was selected by the Buffalo Bills in the third round of the 2003 NFL draft. He played college football for the Virginia Cavaliers.

He is the younger brother of former NFL wide receiver Germane Crowell.

== College career ==
Crowell attended the University of Virginia, where he served as co-captain in 2002. Received 1st Team All-ACC honors in 2002. Set a school record for tackles of 144 in 2001, and then broke his own record the following year.

== Professional career ==
Pre-draft measurables
Height	Weight	Arm length	Hand span	40-yard dash	10-yard split	20-yard split	20-yard shuttle	Three-cone drill	Vertical jump	Bench press
6 ft 0 3/8 in (1.84 m)	236 lb (107 kg)	30 5/8 in (0.78 m)	10 1/8 in (0.26 m)	4.73 s	1.64 s	2.74 s	4.29 s	7.08 s	32.5 in (0.83 m)	25 reps
All values from NFL Combine

=== Buffalo Bills ===
He served primarily as a reserve linebacker for his first two seasons, playing only on special teams. In 2005, after Takeo Spikes went down with a season ending tear of the Achilles tendon Crowell took a spot on the starting roster. He went on that season to record 119 tackles, 1 forced fumble, and 2 interceptions in 12 starts.

In the summer of 2006, he was named the starting strong side linebacker by Buffalo head coach Dick Jauron, replacing Jeff Posey. Crowell started every game until suffering a late season injury against the San Diego Chargers.

Crowell underwent arm surgery after tearing his triceps muscle in the final game of the 2007 season.

On September 4, 2008, Crowell was placed on season-ending injured reserve after undergoing knee surgery.

=== Tampa Bay Buccaneers ===
An unrestricted free agent after the 2008 season, Crowell signed with the Tampa Bay Buccaneers on March 18, 2009. He was placed on season-ending injured reserve on August 24 after suffering a torn biceps muscle during the preseason. On June 18, 2010, Crowell was released by the Buccaneers.

=== Omaha Nighthawks ===
Crowell was signed by the Omaha Nighthawks of the United Football League on August 23, 2011.

=== NFL statistics ===
Year	Team	GP	COMB	TOTAL	AST	SACK	FF	FR	FR YDS	INT	IR YDS	AVG IR	LNG	TD	PD
2003	BUF	6	2	2	0	0.0	0	0	0	0	0	0	0	0	0
2004	BUF	16	14	8	6	0.0	0	0	0	0	0	0	0	0	1
2005	BUF	15	119	79	40	3.0	2	0	0	2	3	2	2	0	5
2006	BUF	12	83	58	25	2.0	1	0	0	2	0	0	0	0	7
2007	BUF	16	126	86	40	2.0	1	1	0	1	5	5	5	0	4
Career		65	344	233	111	7.0	4	1	0	5	8	2	5	0	17
