= Ron Mattes =

American football player and coach (born 1963)

North Carolina A&T Aggies
- Title: Offensive line coach

Personal information
- Born: August 8, 1963 (age 63); Shenandoah, Pennsylvania, U.S.
- Listed height: 6 ft 6 in (1.98 m)
- Listed weight: 309 lb (140 kg)

Career information
- High school: North Schuylkill (Ashland, Pennsylvania)
- College: Virginia
- NFL draft: 1985: 7th round, 193rd overall pick

Career history

Playing
- Seattle Seahawks (1985–1990); Chicago Bears (1991); Indianapolis Colts (1992); San Francisco 49ers (1993)*
- * Offseason or practice squad member only

Coaching
- James Madison (1995–1999) Tight ends coach, offensive tackles coach, & defensive tackles coach; Virginia (2010) Offensive line coach; Elon (2011–2013) Offensive line coach, run game coordinator, & long snappers coach; VMI (2014) Tight ends coach; North Carolina A&T (2016–2025) Offensive line coach

Career NFL statistics
- Games played: 95
- Games started: 60
- Stats at Pro Football Reference

Ronald Anthony Mattes (born August 8, 1963) is a former American college football coach and offensive tackle. He was selected by the Seattle Seahawks of the National Football League (NFL) in the seventh round of the 1985 NFL draft and also played for the Chicago Bears. He played college football at the University of Virginia. He also coached for Virginia.
