= John Papit =

American football player (1928–2015)

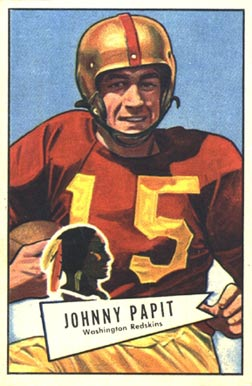
- Papit on a 1952 Bowman football card

No. 15, 25, 22
- Position: Halfback

Personal information
- Born: July 25, 1928; Philadelphia, Pennsylvania, U.S.
- Died: April 6, 2015 (aged 86); Forest, Virginia, U.S.
- Listed height: 6 ft 0 in (1.83 m)
- Listed weight: 190 lb (86 kg)

Career information
- High school: Northeast (Philadelphia)
- College: Virginia (1947–1950)
- NFL draft: 1951: 7th round, 76th overall pick

Career history
- Washington Redskins (1951–1953); Green Bay Packers (1953)

Awards and highlights
- First-team All-American (1949); Virginia Cavaliers Jersey No. 87 retired

Career NFL statistics
- Rushing yards: 379
- Rushing average: 4
- Receptions: 7
- Receiving yards: 123
- Total touchdowns: 2
- Stats at Pro Football Reference

John Michael Papit (July 25, 1928 – April 6, 2015) was an American professional football halfback in the National Football League (NFL) for the Washington Redskins and Green Bay Packers. He played college football at the University of Virginia and was selected in the seventh round of the 1951 NFL draft. He died after a stroke in 2015.
