= Darryl Blackstock =

American football player and coach (born 1983)

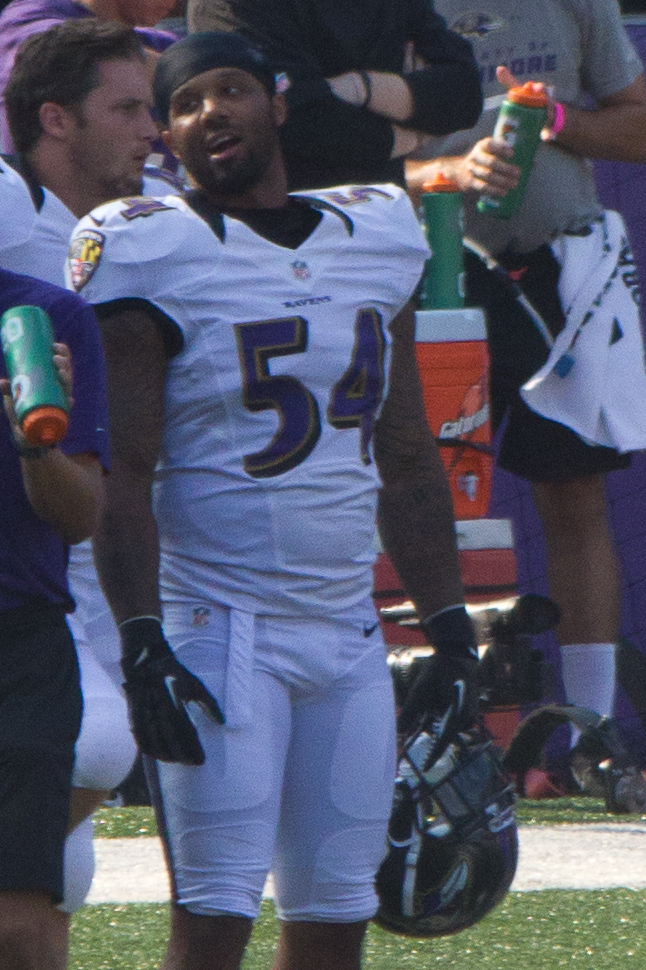
- Blackstock at Ravens M&T Bank Stadium in 2012

William & Mary Tribe
- Title: Special teams coordinator & outside linebackers coach

Personal information
- Born: May 30, 1983 (age 43); Fort Stewart, Georgia, U.S.
- Listed height: 6 ft 4 in (1.93 m)
- Listed weight: 240 lb (109 kg)

Career information
- High school: Heritage (Newport News, Virginia)
- College: Virginia
- NFL draft: 2005: 3rd round, 95th overall pick

Career history

Playing
- Arizona Cardinals (2005–2007); Cincinnati Bengals (2008); Florida Tuskers (2010); Oakland Raiders (2011); Baltimore Ravens (2012)*
- * Offseason or practice squad member only

Coaching
- William & Mary (2019) Defensive analyst; William and Mary (2020–2022) Outside linebackers coach; William and Mary (2023–present) Special teams coordinator & outside linebackers coach

Awards and highlights
- Second-team All-ACC (2004)

Career NFL statistics
- Total tackles: 99
- Sacks: 4
- Forced fumbles: 2
- Fumble recoveries: 2
- Stats at Pro Football Reference

Darryl Tyger Blackstock (born May 30, 1983) is an American college football coach and former linebacker. He was selected by the Arizona Cardinals in the third round of the 2005 NFL draft. He played college football for the Virginia Cavaliers. He also played for the Cincinnati Bengals, Oakland Raiders and Florida Tuskers. He is currently the special teams coordinator and outside linebackers coach at William & Mary.

== College career ==
Blackstock played college football at the University of Virginia. In 2004 Blackstock was selected to the Second-team All-ACC.

== Professional career ==
=== Arizona Cardinals ===
Blackstock played three seasons in Arizona. From 2005 to 2007 Blackstock recorded 44 tackles, 4 sacks and 2 Forced fumbles.

=== Cincinnati Bengals ===
In 2008, Blackstock signed with the Bengals.

=== Florida Tuskers ===
In 2010, Blackstock signed with Florida Tuskers of the United Football League.

=== Oakland Raiders ===
Returned to the NFL and signed with the Raiders. Blackstock played 16 games and started one game and recorded 20 tackles.

=== Baltimore Ravens ===
On July 25, 2012, Blackstock signed with Baltimore Ravens.
