= Frank Quayle =

American gridiron football player (born 1947)

No. 26
- Position: Halfback

Personal information
- Born: January 15, 1947 (age 79); Brooklyn, New York, U.S.
- Listed height: 5 ft 10 in (1.78 m)
- Listed weight: 195 lb (88 kg)

Career information
- High school: Garden City, (Hempstead, New York)
- College: Virginia
- NFL draft: 1969: 5th round, 113th overall pick

Career history
- Denver Broncos (1969); New York Jets (1970)*; Miami Dolphins (1971)*; Hamilton Tiger-Cats (1971)
- * Offseason or practice squad member only

Awards and highlights
- ACC Player of the Year (1968); 2× First-team All-ACC (1967, 1968); Virginia Cavaliers No. 24 retired

Career AFL statistics
- Rushing yards: 183
- Rushing average: 3.2
- Receptions: 11
- Receiving yards: 167
- Stats at Pro Football Reference

Frank Joseph Quayle III (born January 15, 1947) is a former American and Canadian football player who played for the Denver Broncos and Hamilton Tiger-Cats. He played college football at the University of Virginia.
