= Marques Hagans =

American football player and coach (born 1982)

Michigan Wolverines
- Title: Assistant wide receivers coach

Personal information
- Born: December 29, 1982 (age 43); Newport News, Virginia, U.S.
- Listed height: 5 ft 10 in (1.78 m)
- Listed weight: 205 lb (93 kg)

Career information
- High school: Hampton (Hampton, Virginia)
- College: Virginia
- NFL draft: 2006: 5th round, 144th overall pick

Career history

Playing
- St. Louis Rams (2006–2007); Kansas City Chiefs (2008); Indianapolis Colts (2008)*; Washington Redskins (2008–2009)*; Washington Redskins (2010)*
- * Offseason or practice squad member only

Coaching
- Virginia (2011–2012) Graduate assistant; Virginia (2013–2022) Wide receivers coach; Penn State (2023–2025) Wide receivers coach; Michigan (2026–present) Assistant wide receivers coach

Career NFL statistics
- Receptions: 9
- Receiving yards: 108
- Return yards: 130
- Stats at Pro Football Reference

Marques Terrelle Hagans (born December 29, 1982) is an American football coach and former wide receiver, currently the assistant wide receivers coach at the University of Michigan. He was most recently the wide receivers coach at Penn State and Virginia from 2013 to 2025. Hagans played college football at Virginia and was selected by the St. Louis Rams in the fifth round of the 2006 NFL draft. He was also a member of the Kansas City Chiefs, Indianapolis Colts and Washington Redskins until 2010.

== Early and personal life ==
Hagans is a native of Hampton, Virginia, and played high school football for Hampton High School during his junior and senior seasons after transferring from neighboring Bethel High School. As a junior, Hagans replaced the graduated Ronald Curry at quarterback and led the Crabbers to the state championship in Group AAA, Division 5 of the Virginia High School League in 1998. Hampton advanced to the state semi-finals in Hagans' senior season in 1999.

Hagans' nickname is "Biscuit." He is married to former Virginia women's basketball player Lauren Swierczek.

== College career ==
Hagans played college football for the University of Virginia. He was originally recruited by Indiana University to replace Antwaan Randle El. However, Hagans enrolled for a year at Fork Union Military Academy after graduation from Hampton and subsequently decided to enroll at Virginia in the fall of 2001. He redshirted his true freshman year. Hagans replaced incumbent quarterback Matt Schaub during the first game of the 2002 season against Colorado State University. Hagans was named the starter for the following game against Florida State University but was replaced by Schaub, who went on to a breakout season. Hagans was primarily a wide receiver and kick returner for the remainder of 2002 and 2003, though he continued to receive limited playing time at quarterback. Hagans became the starting quarterback for the 2004 season after Schaub's graduation.

In 2004, the Cavaliers started 5-0 and attained a #6 national ranking before losing at Florida State and finishing with a final record of 8–4 after losing to Fresno State in the MPC Computers Bowl. His most notable game at the University of Virginia was a 26–21 victory over #4 Florida State in 2005. In his final game, Hagans led the Cavaliers to a come from behind victory over Minnesota in the Music City Bowl to cap a 7–5 season.

He graduated with a degree in anthropology.

== Professional career ==
Pre-draft measurables
Height	Weight	Arm length	Hand span	40-yard dash	10-yard split	20-yard split	20-yard shuttle	Three-cone drill	Vertical jump	Broad jump
5 ft 9 3/8 in (1.76 m)	202 lb (92 kg)	30 in (0.76 m)	9 1/4 in (0.23 m)	4.55 s	1.58 s	2.66 s	4.32 s	6.88 s	35 in (0.89 m)	9 ft 8 in (2.95 m)
All values from NFL Combine/Virginia's Pro Day

=== St. Louis Rams ===
Hagans was selected by the St. Louis Rams in the fifth round (144th overall) of the 2006 NFL Draft. In his rookie season he played in four games making eight receptions for 101 yards. Hagans was the emergency quarterback for the Rams.

He was waived by the Rams on August 29, 2008.

=== Kansas City Chiefs ===
Hagans was signed to the Kansas City Chiefs practice squad on September 1, 2008. He was then promoted to the 53-man roster and signed to a two-year contract on September 10. He was listed as the Chiefs "Emergency Quarterback" and played at QB for several trick plays against the Raiders. After linebacker Weston Dacus was promoted to the active roster, Hagans was waived on September 26 and re-signed to the practice squad two days later.

He was released from the practice squad on October 22, 2008, after the team signed wide receiver Nate Hughes to the practice squad.

=== Indianapolis Colts ===
Hagans was signed to the practice squad of the Indianapolis Colts on November 19, 2008, only to be released on November 26.

=== Washington Redskins ===
Hagans was signed to the practice squad of the Washington Redskins on December 9, 2008.

He was waived on August 30, 2009.

Hagans was re-signed by the Redskins on April 19, 2010. He was released June 29, 2010.
