= Patrick Jeffers =

American football player (born 1973)

No. 82, 81, 83, 10
- Position: Wide receiver

Personal information
- Born: February 2, 1973 (age 53); Fort Campbell, Kentucky, U.S.
- Listed height: 6 ft 3 in (1.91 m)
- Listed weight: 217 lb (98 kg)

Career information
- High school: Fort Worth Country Day (Fort Worth, Texas)
- College: Virginia
- NFL draft: 1996: 5th round, 159th overall pick

Career history
- Denver Broncos (1996–1997); Dallas Cowboys (1998); Carolina Panthers (1999–2001)

Awards and highlights
- Super Bowl champion (XXXII)

Career NFL statistics
- Receptions: 98
- Receiving yards: 1,563
- Receiving touchdowns: 14
- Stats at Pro Football Reference

Patrick Christopher Jeffers (born February 2, 1973) is an American former professional football player who was a wide receiver in the National Football League (NFL) for the Denver Broncos, Dallas Cowboys, and Carolina Panthers. With the Broncos, he won Super Bowl XXXII. He played college football for the Virginia Cavaliers.

== Early life ==
Jeffers attended Fort Worth Country Day School, where he was a two-time All-conference selection, playing as a wide receiver, cornerback, free safety, punter, placekicker. He finished his career with 52 receptions for 980 yards and 10 touchdowns.

He was a two-time All-conference selection in soccer. In track, he won the conference title in the 400 metre dash twice and set school records in the 200 and 400 metres.

== College career ==
Jeffers walked-on at the University of Virginia. As a redshirt freshman, his first reception was a 20-yard touchdown against the University of Maryland. He appeared in 11 games, tallying 9 receptions for 128 yards and 3 touchdowns.

As a sophomore, he played in the first 9 games (2 starts), before suffering a broken clavicle against Wake Forest University and missing 2 games. He led the team with 32 receptions for 580 yards and 6 touchdowns.

As a junior in 1994, he played in 11 games (4 starts), registering 33 receptions for 560 yards (17 yards avg.) and 3 touchdowns. His best game came against North Carolina State University, where he had 6 receptions for 153 yards, including a 52-yard touchdown.

As a senior, he missed 4 games with a hamstring injury, but still led the team with 34 receptions for 517 yards (15.2 yards avg.) and 3 touchdowns. At the time, he finished his college career with 108 receptions (fourth in school history) for 1,785 yards (fourth in school history) and 15 touchdowns. He also holds the school record for the longest streak of games with at least one reception (31).

== Professional career ==
=== Denver Broncos ===
Jeffers was selected by the Denver Broncos in the fifth round (159th overall) of the 1996 NFL draft. As a rookie, he was used mostly on special teams, appearing in the first three games, before being declared inactive for the next 12 and playing again in the season finale against the San Diego Chargers.

The next year, he was the team's fourth wide receiver, appearing in 10 games and being declared inactive in 6. He played primarily on special teams, as part of a team that won Super Bowl XXXII. On August 30, 1998, he was traded to the Dallas Cowboys in exchange for past considerations.

=== Dallas Cowboys ===
In 1998, Jeffers spent the first half of the season learning the Dallas Cowboys offense and playing mainly on the scout team. He appeared in 8 games, finishing with 18 receptions for 330 yards and 2 touchdowns. He also led the team with 7 receptions for 92 yards, in the first-round playoff loss against the Arizona Cardinals.

He was declared a restricted free agent at the end of the season and although he was seen as a player on the rise, the Cowboys gambled and tendered him a qualifying offer at his original draft round. The Carolina Panthers signed him to a one-year offer sheet for a $1.2 million base salary, that the Cowboys did not to match. The team received a fifth-round pick as compensation, that was eventually used to trade up to select Ebenezer Ekuban.

=== Carolina Panthers ===
Jeffers' new contract made him the highest paid wide receiver on the Carolina Panthers roster, but he still had to work his way into the starting lineup. He played in 15 games (10 starts) and had a breakout season, registering 63 receptions for 1,082 yards (17.2 yards avg.) and 12 touchdowns.

He finished strong, recording 5 straight 100-yard receiving games (two short of the NFL record). He also set several franchise records:

- 17.2 yards per reception average.
- 6 consecutive games with a touchdown reception.
- 12 touchdown receptions in a season (tied the team record).
- 88-yard reception against the Pittsburgh Steelers (second longest in team history)
- Teamed with Muhsin Muhammad (1,253 yards) to become the first tandem in Panthers history to each register 1,000 receiving yards in the same season.

On August 10, 2000, he was lost for the year after tearing his right anterior cruciate ligament, while playing in a preseason game against the Pittsburgh Steelers. Besides repairing the ligament, he had additional procedures performed in both knees and although he was able to rehabilitate his right knee, the left one deteriorated until needing microfracture surgery.

Jeffers returned in 2001 to play 9 games in a reserve role, but was not able to regain his previous form. He was released on August 23, 2002.

== Personal life ==
His sister is Allison Jeffers Dooley, who is married to Derek Dooley, former head coach at the University of Tennessee. He also has four children.
