= Billy McMullen =

American football player (born 1980)

No. 81, 80, 12, 17
- Position: Wide receiver

Personal information
- Born: March 8, 1980 (age 46); Richmond, Virginia, U.S.
- Listed height: 6 ft 4 in (1.93 m)
- Listed weight: 215 lb (98 kg)

Career information
- High school: Henrico High School (VA), Fork Union Military Academy (VA)
- College: University of Virginia
- NFL draft: 2003: 3rd round, 95th overall pick

Career history
- Philadelphia Eagles (2003–2005); Minnesota Vikings (2006); Washington Redskins (2008)*; Seattle Seahawks (2008), (2009)*; Detroit Lions (2009)*
- * Offseason or practice squad member only

Awards and highlights
- Third-team All-American (2001); 2× First-team All-ACC (2001, 2002); Dudley Award (2001)

Career NFL statistics
- Receptions: 52
- Receiving yards: 725
- Receiving touchdowns: 3
- Stats at Pro Football Reference

Wilbur Anthony McMullen Jr. (born March 8, 1980) is an American former professional football player who was a wide receiver in the National Football League (NFL). He was selected by the Philadelphia Eagles in the third round of the 2003 NFL draft. He played college football for the Virginia Cavaliers.

McMullen was also a member of the Minnesota Vikings, Washington Redskins, Seattle Seahawks, and Detroit Lions.

== High School career ==
McMullen excelled on the football field as a player at Henrico High School. He then entered Fork Union Military Academy as a postgraduate, playing for head coach John Shuman.

== College career ==
As a senior at Virginia in 2002, McMullen became the second all-time leading receiver in ACC conference history with 210 career receptions.

== Professional career ==
Pre-draft measurables
| Height | Weight | Arm length | Hand span |
|---|---|---|---|
| 6 ft 3 5/8 in (1.92 m) | 210 lb (95 kg) | 34 3/4 in (0.88 m) | 10 1/2 in (0.27 m) |
All values from NFL Combine

=== Philadelphia Eagles ===
McMullen was a third-round draft pick for the Philadelphia Eagles in the 2003 NFL Draft. He scored his first NFL touchdown against the Arizona Cardinals on December 24, 2005.

=== Minnesota Vikings ===
McMullen was traded to the Vikings on May 18, 2006, for Hank Baskett, an undrafted rookie receiver. The move reunited him with Brad Childress, who had been his offensive coordinator in Philadelphia before being hired as head coach of the Vikings. He spent one season in Minnesota, hauling in 23 catches for 307 yards and two touchdowns.

=== Washington Redskins ===
On January 2, 2008, McMullen signed a future contract with the Washington Redskins; he was released by the Redskins during final cuts on August 30.

=== Seattle Seahawks ===
McMullen was signed by the Seattle Seahawks on September 9, 2008. The team released wide receiver Jordan Kent to make room for McMullen on the roster. He appeared in four games for Seattle, including two starts, catching seven passes for 124 yards.

On October 18, 2008, McMullen was waived/injured after the Seahawks activated linebacker Will Herring from the PUP list. He remained on injured reserve until he was released with an injury settlement on October 24.

On January 8, 2009, McMullen was re-signed to a future contract by the Seahawks. He was released on August 8 when the team signed first-round draft pick Aaron Curry.

=== Detroit Lions ===
McMullen was signed by the Detroit Lions on August 11, 2009, but he was waived on August 28 after the team claimed Glenn Holt off waivers.
