= Tyrone Davis (tight end) =

American football player (1972–2022)

No. 83, 81
- Position: Tight end

Personal information
- Born: June 30, 1972; Halifax, Virginia, U.S.
- Died: October 2, 2022 (aged 50)
- Listed height: 6 ft 4 in (1.93 m)
- Listed weight: 240 lb (109 kg)

Career information
- High school: Halifax County (VA); Fork Union Military Academy
- College: Virginia
- NFL draft: 1995: 4th round, 107th overall pick

Career history
- New York Jets (1995–1996); Green Bay Packers (1997–2002)

Awards and highlights
- Second-team All-ACC (1994)

Career NFL statistics
- Receptions: 73
- Receiving yards: 795
- Receiving touchdowns: 13
- Stats at Pro Football Reference

Tyrone Davis (June 30, 1972 – October 2, 2022) was an American professional football player who was a tight end for eight seasons in the National Football League (NFL). He played for the New York Jets and the Green Bay Packers from 1995 to 2002, having earlier played college football for the Virginia Cavaliers.

== Early life ==
Davis was born in Halifax, Virginia, on June 30, 1972. He initially attended Halifax County High School, before completing his secondary education at Fork Union Military Academy. He then studied at the University of Virginia, where he played wide receiver for the Virginia Cavaliers from 1991 to 1994.

During the 1992 season, he led the Atlantic Coast Conference (ACC) in receiving yards per reception (23.8) and had the second-most receiving touchdowns (7). Two years later, he led the conference in receiving touchdowns (10) and finished third in touchdowns from scrimmage (10) and receiving yards per reception (18.2). He later set the school record for career touchdown receptions with 28, breaking the previous record set by Herman Moore, whom Davis replaced as a starting wide receiver in 1991. Davis was selected by the New York Jets in the fourth round (107th overall) of the 1995 NFL draft, the first of two wide receivers drafted by the franchise that year (the other being Curtis Ceaser in the seventh round).

== Career ==
Davis was drafted in the fourth round of the 1995 NFL Draft with the 107th overall pick. Davis made his NFL debut with the Jets on September 3, 1995, at the age of 23, in a 52–14 loss against the Miami Dolphins. Before the start of his second season, he switched positions from wide receiver to tight end. He was traded to the Green Bay Packers on August 26, 1997, for past considerations, and was tied for the third-most fumble return touchdowns (1) in the league that year. The Packers went on to reach the Super Bowl XXXII, losing to the Denver Broncos in the championship game that Davis did not play in.

During the later years of his NFL career, Davis struggled with weight issues, ending the 2000 season at 277 pounds (126 kg). He then turned up at post-draft minicamp the following April at approximately 280 pounds (130 kg), even though he had been instructed to lose weight. He later underwent surgery in July to repair a torn hamstring, which kept him on the injured reserve list for the majority of the 2001 season. Davis again turned up to minicamp overweight in 2003, and was subsequently released by the Packers after a poor performance at training camp.

== Personal life ==
Davis died on October 2, 2022, at the age of 50.
