= Chris Slade (American football) =

American football player (born 1971)

Virginia Cavaliers
- Title: Defensive ends coach

Personal information
- Born: January 30, 1971 (age 55); Newport News, Virginia, U.S.
- Listed height: 6 ft 5 in (1.96 m)
- Listed weight: 245 lb (111 kg)

Career information
- High school: Tabb (Yorktown, Virginia)
- College: Virginia (1989–1992)
- NFL draft: 1993: 2nd round, 31st overall pick

Career history

Playing
- New England Patriots (1993–2000); Carolina Panthers (2001)

Coaching
- Pace Academy (2013–2021) Head coach; Virginia (2022–present) Defensive ends coach

Awards and highlights
- Second-team All-Pro (1997); Pro Bowl (1997); New England Patriots All-1990s Team; Consensus All-American (1992); Third-team All-American (1991); 2× First-team All-ACC (1990, 1992); Second-team All-ACC (1991); Virginia Cavaliers No. 85 retired

Career NFL statistics
- Tackles: 664
- Sacks: 53.5
- Forced fumbles: 16
- Touchdowns: 2
- Stats at Pro Football Reference

Christopher Carroll Slade (born January 30, 1971) is an American former professional football player who was a linebacker in the National Football League (NFL) for nine seasons. He played college football for the Virginia Cavaliers, and earned consensus All-American honors. A second-round pick in the 1993 NFL draft, he played professionally for the New England Patriots and Carolina Panthers of the NFL. Slade was recognized as a Pro Bowl selection and All-Pro after the 1997 season. He is currently an assistant coach at Virginia.

== Personal life ==
Slade was born in Newport News, Virginia. He graduated from Tabb High School in Yorktown, Virginia, where he played for the Tabb Tigers high school football team. He was the head football coach at Pace Academy from 2013 to 2021 and has two children.

== College career ==
While attending the University of Virginia on an athletic scholarship, Slade played for coach George Welsh's Cavaliers teams from 1989 to 1992. As a senior in 1992 and a junior in 1991, he was recognized as a consensus first-team All-American. Slade still holds the Atlantic Coast Conference record for most career sacks with 40.

== Professional career ==
Pre-draft measurables
Height	Weight	Arm length	Hand span	40-yard dash	10-yard split	20-yard split	20-yard shuttle	Vertical jump	Broad jump	Bench press
6 ft 4 in (1.93 m)	234 lb (106 kg)	33 1/4 in (0.84 m)	9 in (0.23 m)	4.74 s	1.72 s	2.81 s	4.60 s	30.5 in (0.77 m)	10 ft 1 in (3.07 m)	19 reps

The New England Patriots selected Slade in the second round, as the 31st overall pick, of the 1993 NFL Draft. He played for the Patriots from 1993 to 2000. During his final pro season in 2001, he was a member of the Carolina Panthers. In nine NFL seasons, he played in 142 regular season games, started 108 of them, and compiled 665 tackles, 53.5 quarterback sacks, 16 forced fumbles, three interceptions and two touchdowns.

=== NFL statistics ===
Year	Team	Games	Combined tackles	Tackles	Assisted tackles	Sacks	Forced fumbles	Fumble recoveries	Fumble return yards	Interceptions	Interception REturn Yards	Yards per interception return	Longest interception return	Interceptions returned for touchdown	Passes defended
1993	NE	16	39	25	14	9.0	3	1	0	0	0	0	0	0	0
1994	NE	16	102	60	42	9.5	5	0	0	0	0	0	0	0	3
1995	NE	16	94	70	24	4.0	1	2	0	0	1	27	27	1	4
1996	NE	16	68	49	19	7.0	3	0	0	1	2	2	2	0	3
1997	NE	16	87	61	26	9.0	2	0	0	1	1	1	1	1	8
1998	NE	15	70	43	27	4.0	1	0	0	0	0	0	0	0	1
1999	NE	16	94	52	42	4.5	0	0	0	1	0	0	0	0	5
2000	NE	16	78	52	26	4.0	1	0	0	0	0	0	0	0	0
2001	CAR	15	24	17	7	2.5	0	0	0	0	0	0	0	0	3
Career		142	656	429	227	53.5	16	3	0	3	3	2	27	2	27

== Coaching career ==
Slade was the head football coach at Pace Academy in Atlanta. His 2015 Pace Academy varsity squad won the AA 2015 Georgia High School football Championship on December 12, 2015. He resigned from Pace Academy on December 7, 2021, and on January 3, 2022, Slade was announced as an assistant coach at Virginia under new head coach Tony Elliott.
