= List of Wisconsin Badgers in the NFL draft =

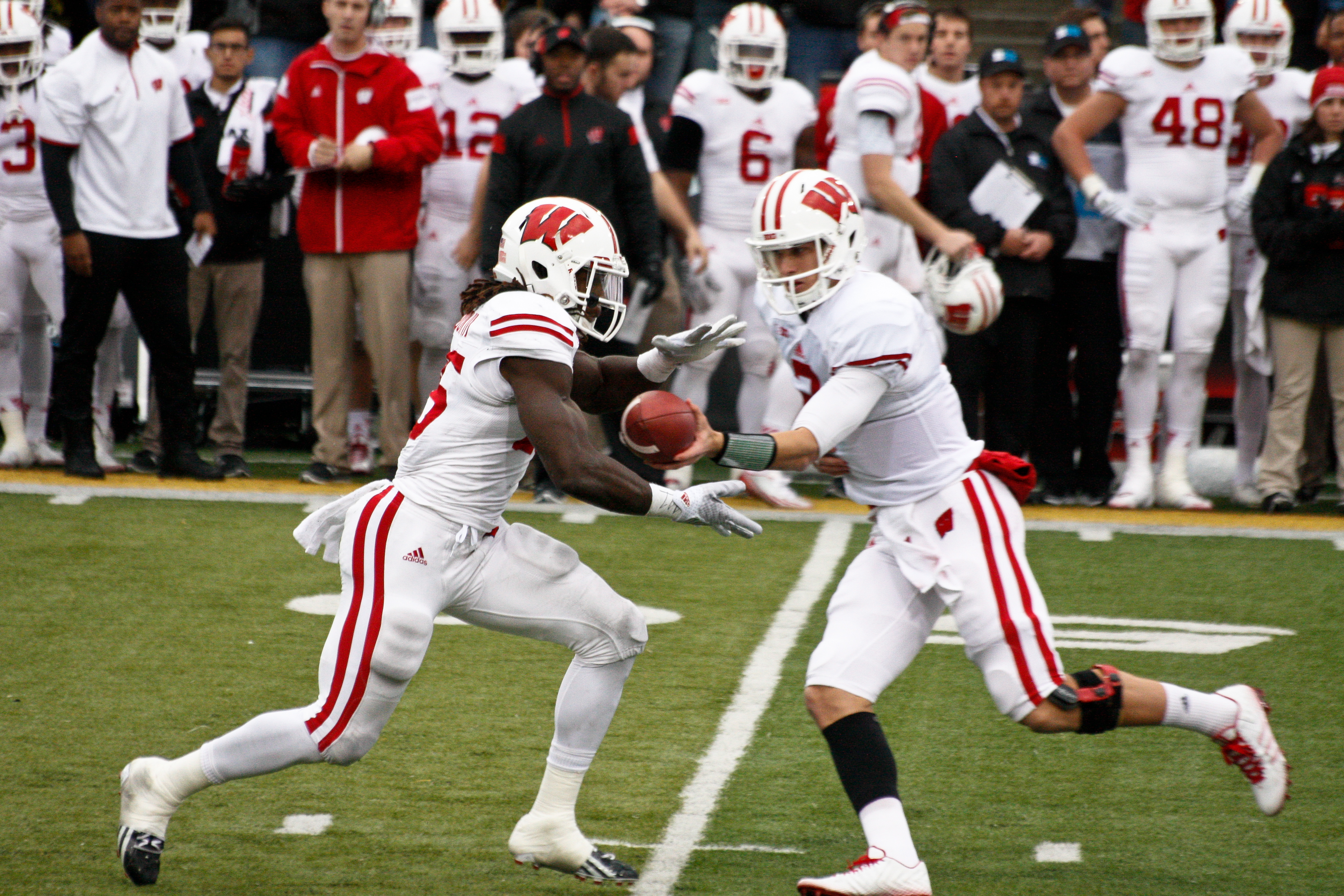
Joel Stave was undrafted in the 2016 NFL draft while Melvin Gordon was drafted 15th overall by the San Diego Chargers in the 2015 NFL draft.

The University of Wisconsin–Madison Badgers have drafted 301 players into the National Football League (NFL) since the league began holding drafts in 1936. (Note: Because of the NFL–AFL merger agreement, the history of the AFL is officially recognized by the NFL and therefore this list includes the AFL draft (1960–1966) and the common draft (1967–1969).) The Badgers' highest draft position was second overall in 1944, when Pat Harder was selected by Card-Pitt. Wisconsin's first drafted player in the NFL was Eddie Jankowski, who was the 9th overall pick by the Green Bay Packers in 1937. Two former Badgers were selected from the latest NFL draft: Jack Nelson and Hunter Wohler.

Each NFL franchise seeks to add new players through the annual NFL draft. The team with the worst record the previous year picks first, the next-worst team second, and so on. Teams that did not make the playoffs are ordered by their regular-season record, with any remaining ties broken by strength of schedule. Playoff participants are sequenced after non-playoff teams, based on their round of elimination (wild card, division, conference, and Super Bowl).

Before the AFL–NFL merger agreements in 1966, the American Football League (AFL) operated in direct competition with the NFL and held a separate draft. This led to a massive bidding war over top prospects between the two leagues. As part of the merger agreement on June 8, 1966, the two leagues would hold a multiple round "common draft". Once the AFL officially merged with the NFL in 1970, the common draft simply became the NFL draft. This list includes players that have transferred to or from Wisconsin.

== Key ==
B	Back (Note: In American and Canadian football, a back is a player who is lined up behind the linemen, the players who line up closest to the line of scrimmage.)	K	Kicker	NT	Nose tackle
C	Center	LB	Linebacker	FB	Fullback
DB	Defensive back	P	Punter	HB	Halfback
DE	Defensive end	QB	Quarterback	WR	Wide receiver
DT	Defensive tackle	RB	Running back	G	Guard
E	End	T	Offensive tackle	TE	Tight end

^{*}	Selected to an all-star game (AFL All-Star game, NFL All-Star game or Pro Bowl)
^{†}	Won a league championship (AFL championship, NFL championship, or Super Bowl)
^{‡}	Selected to an all-star game and won a league championship

== Selections ==
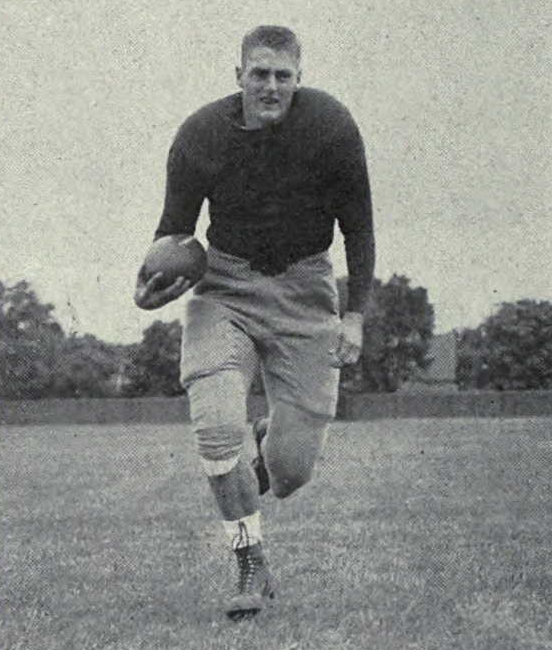
Elroy Hirsch was drafted 5th overall by the Cleveland Rams in the 1945 NFL draft.

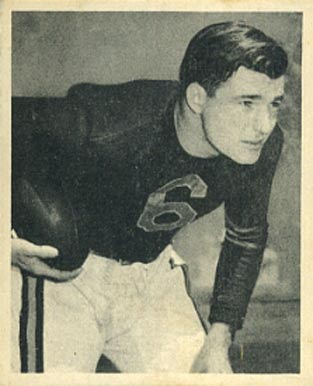
Don Kindt was drafted 11th overall by the Chicago Bears in the 1947 NFL draft.

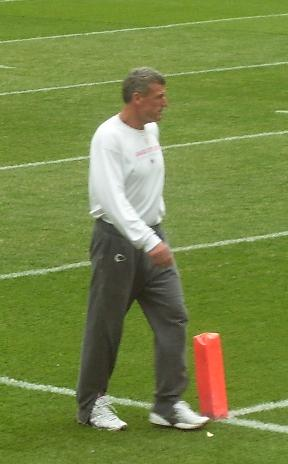
Tim Krumrie was drafted 276th overall by the Cincinnati Bengals in the 1983 NFL draft.

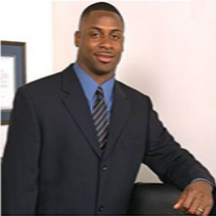
Troy Vincent was drafted 7th overall by the Miami Dolphins in the 1992 NFL draft.

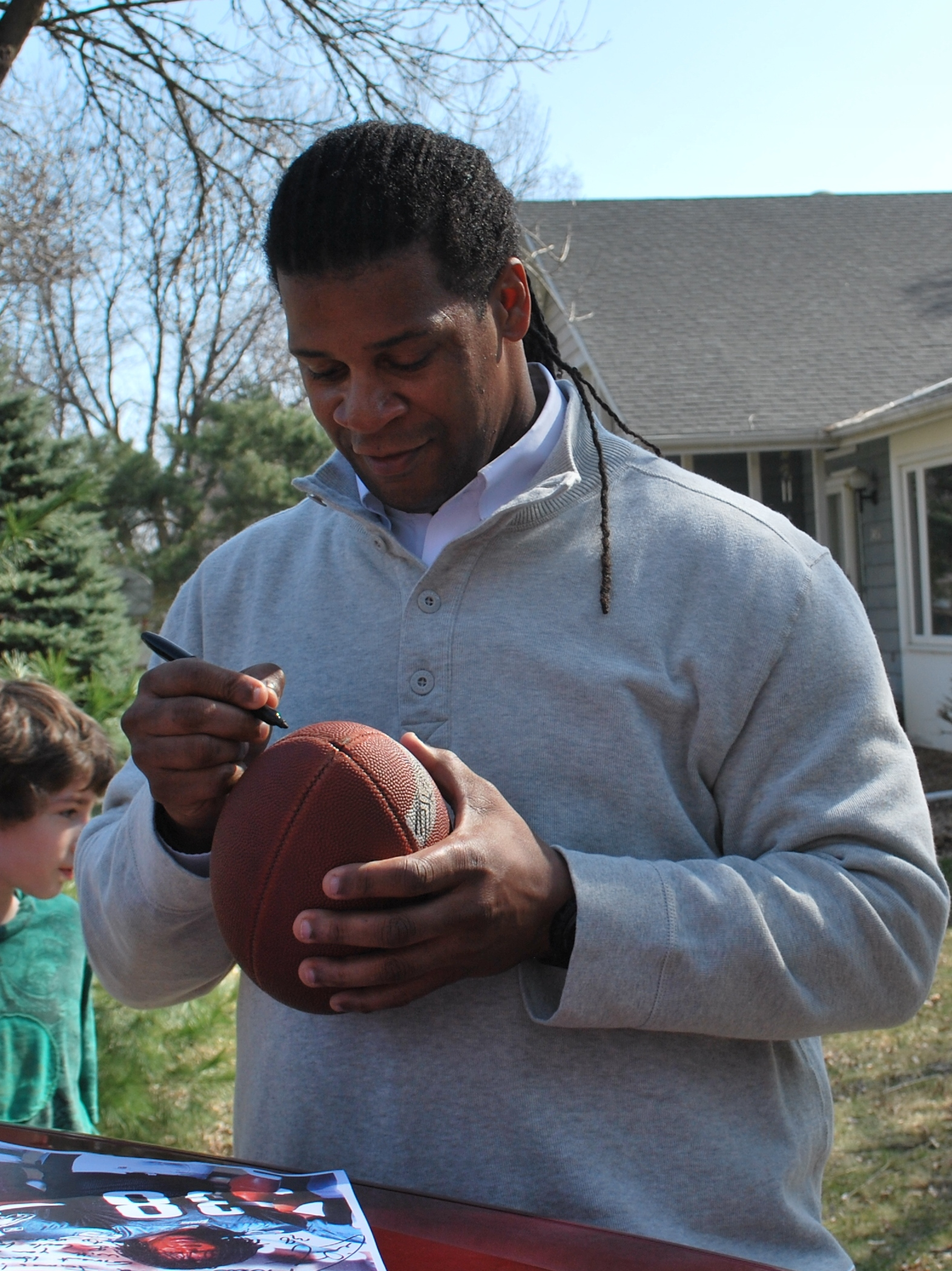
Cecil Martin was drafted 172nd overall by the Philadelphia Eagles in the 1999 NFL draft.

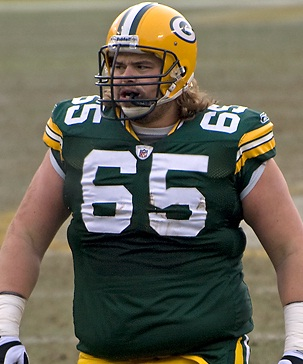
Mark Tauscher was drafted 224th overall by the Green Bay Packers in the 2000 NFL draft.

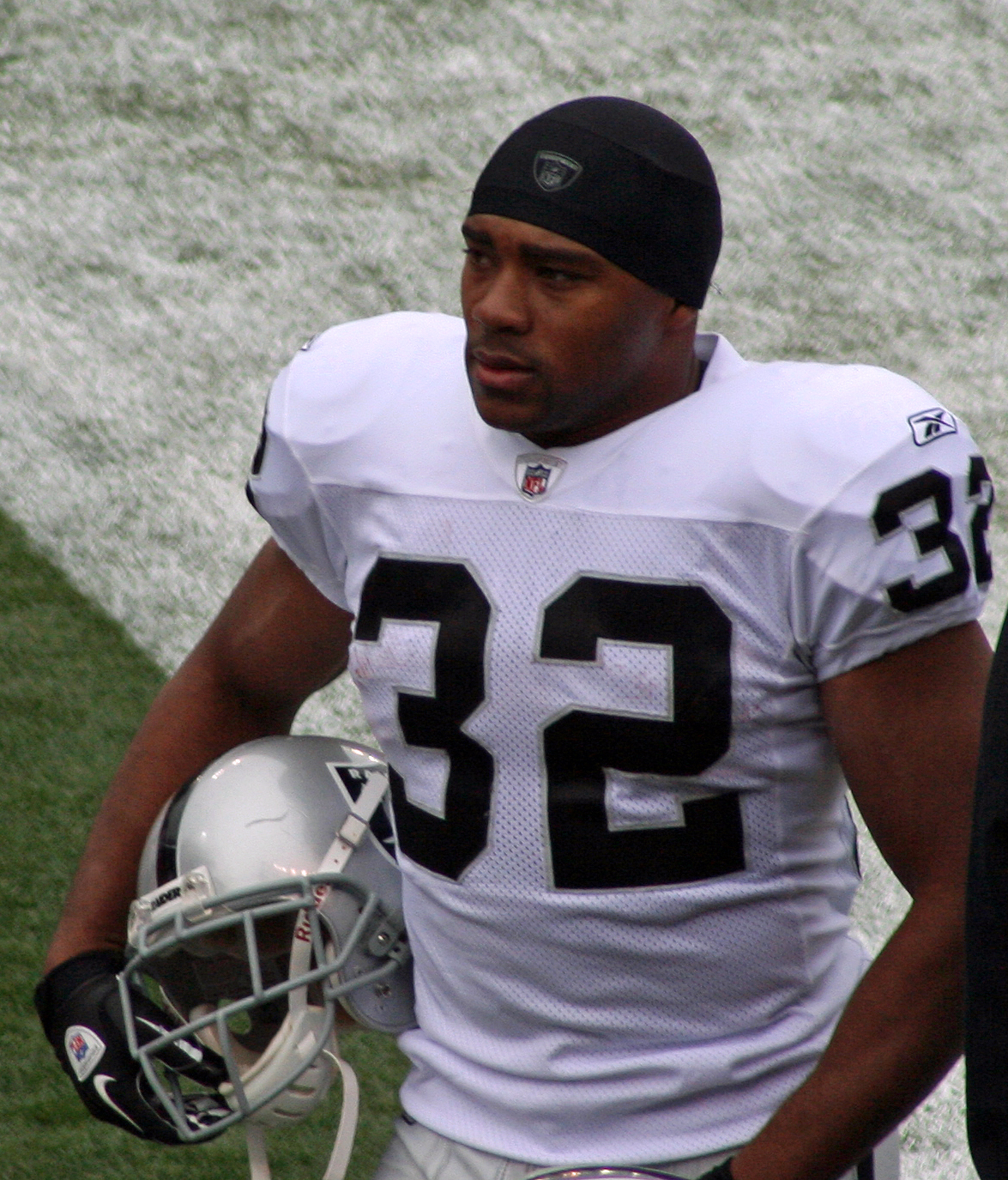
Michael Bennett was drafted 27th overall by the Minnesota Vikings in the 2001 NFL draft.

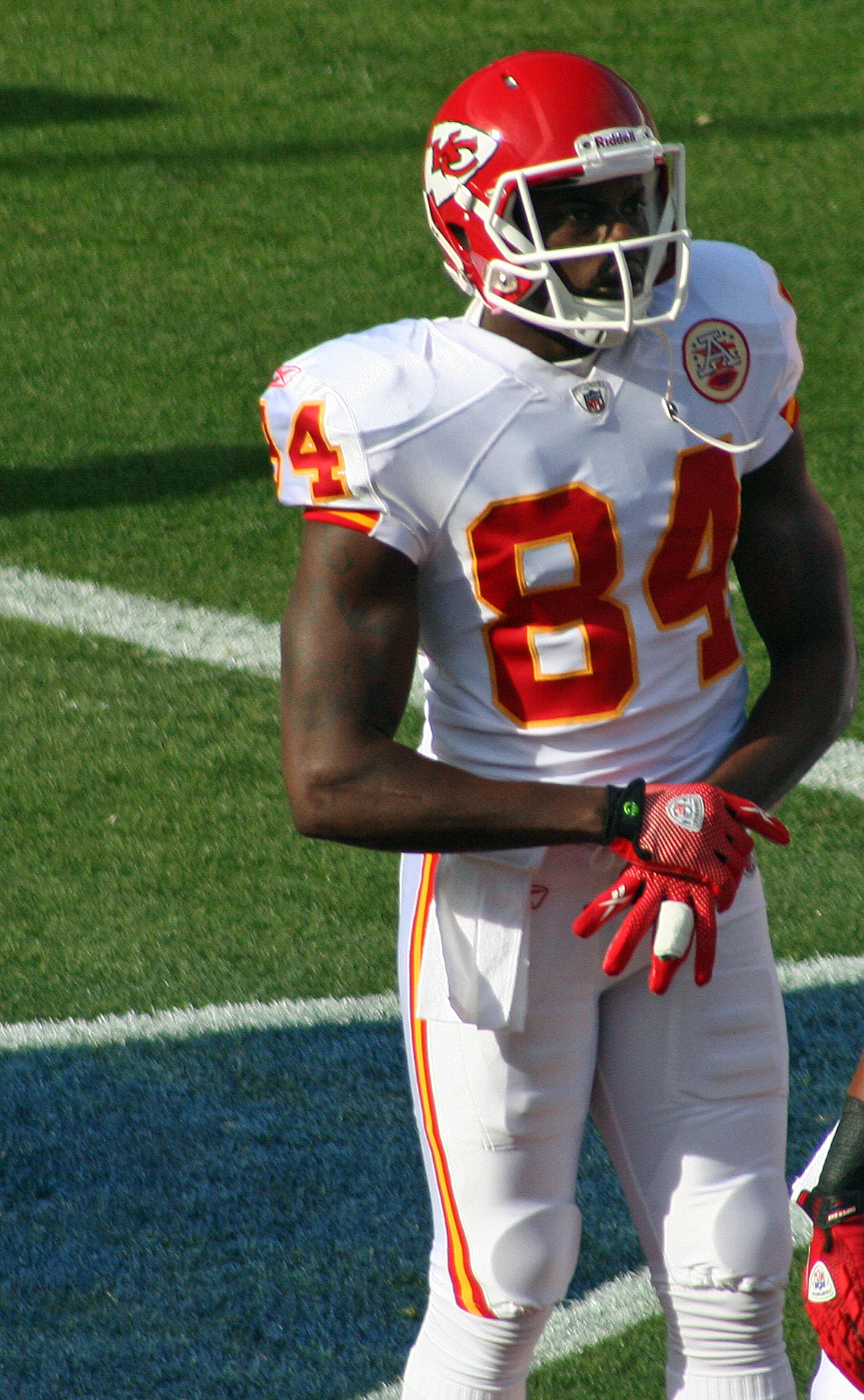
Chris Chambers was drafted 52nd overall by the Miami Dolphins in the 2001 NFL draft.

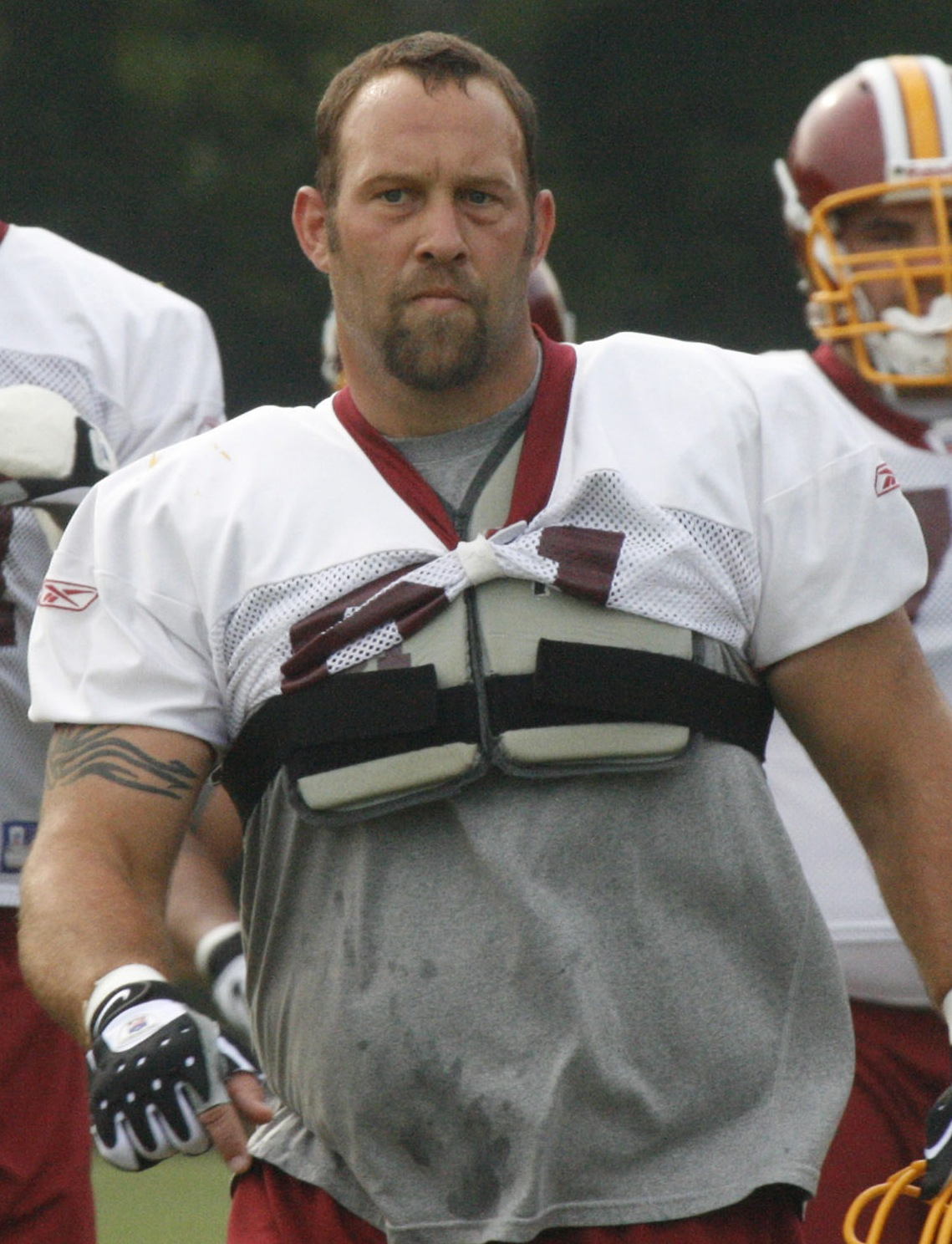
Casey Rabach was drafted 92nd overall by the Baltimore Ravens in the 2001 NFL draft.

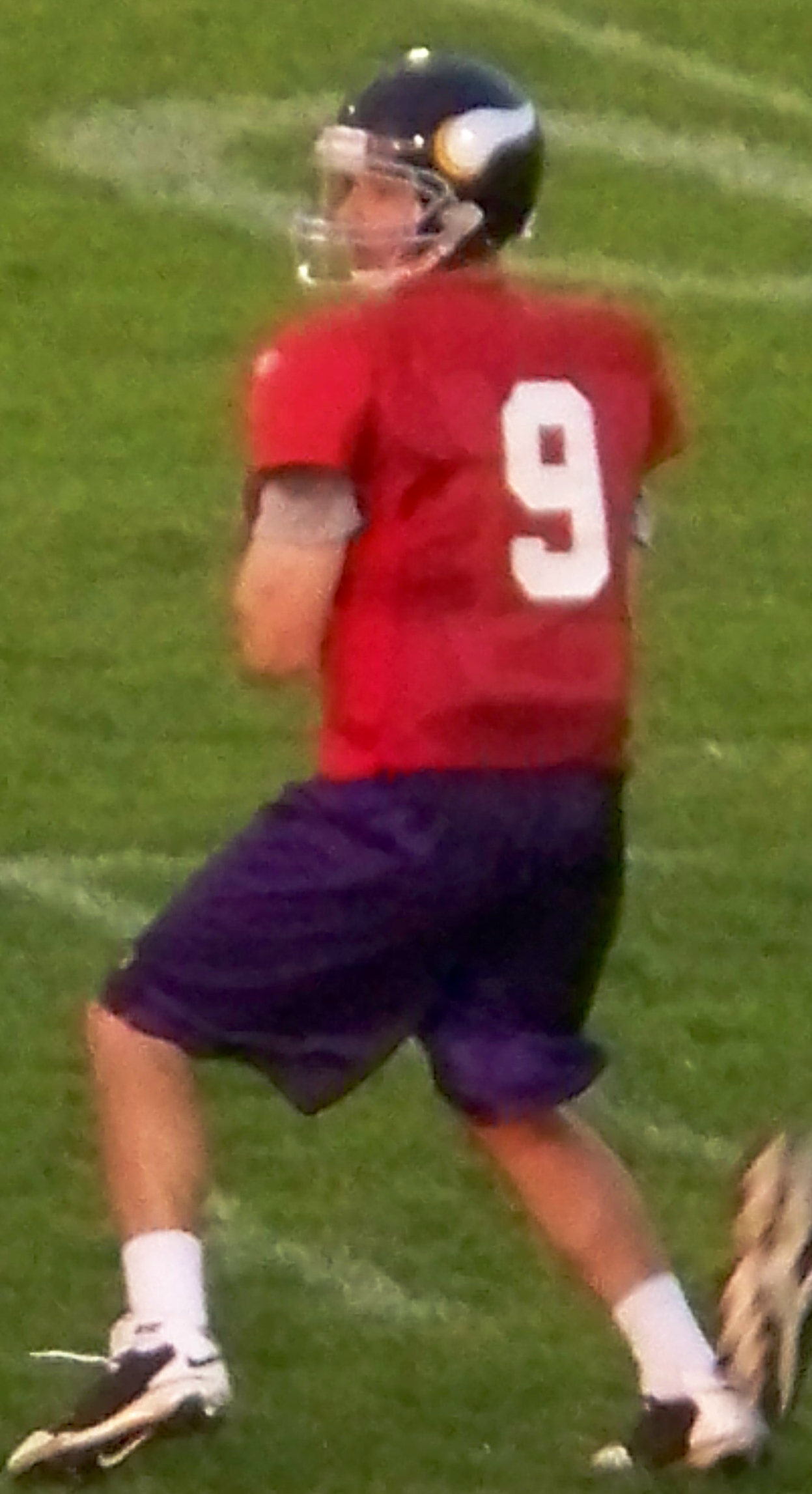
Brooks Bollinger was drafted 200th overall by the New York Jets in the 2003 NFL draft.

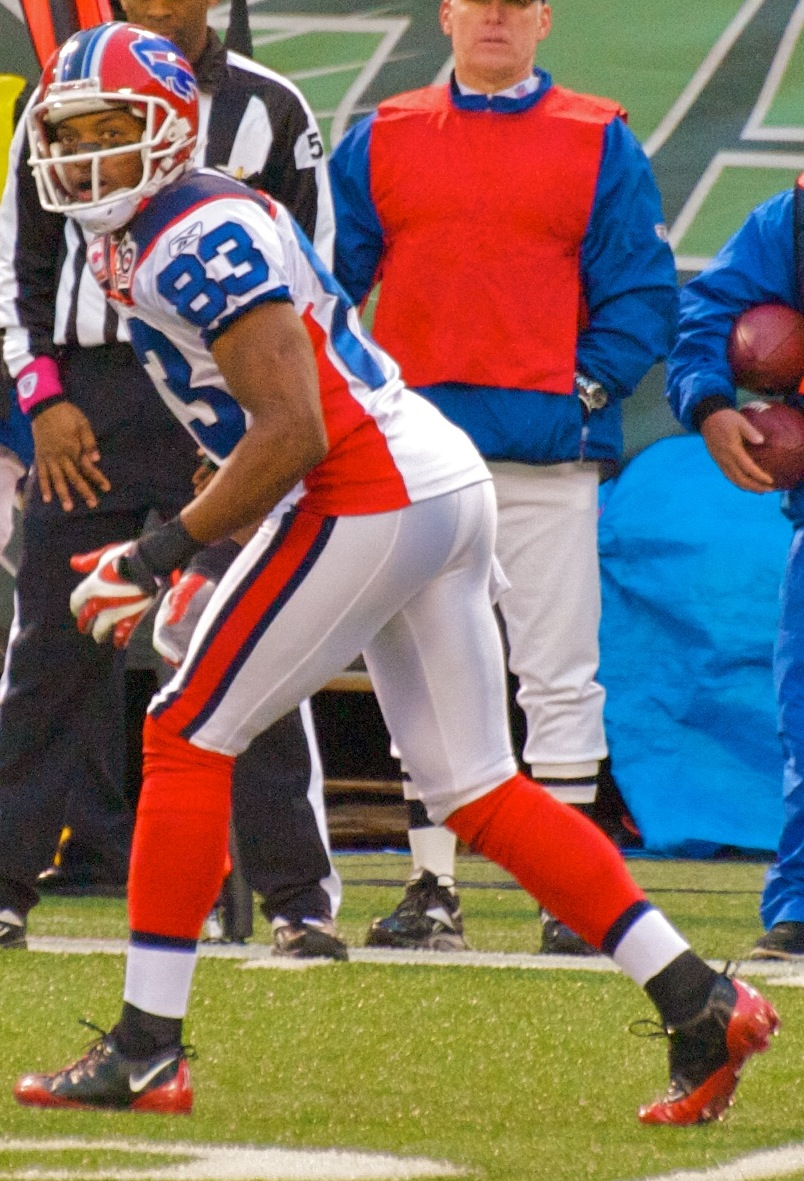
Lee Evans was drafted 13th overall by the Buffalo Bills in the 2004 NFL draft.

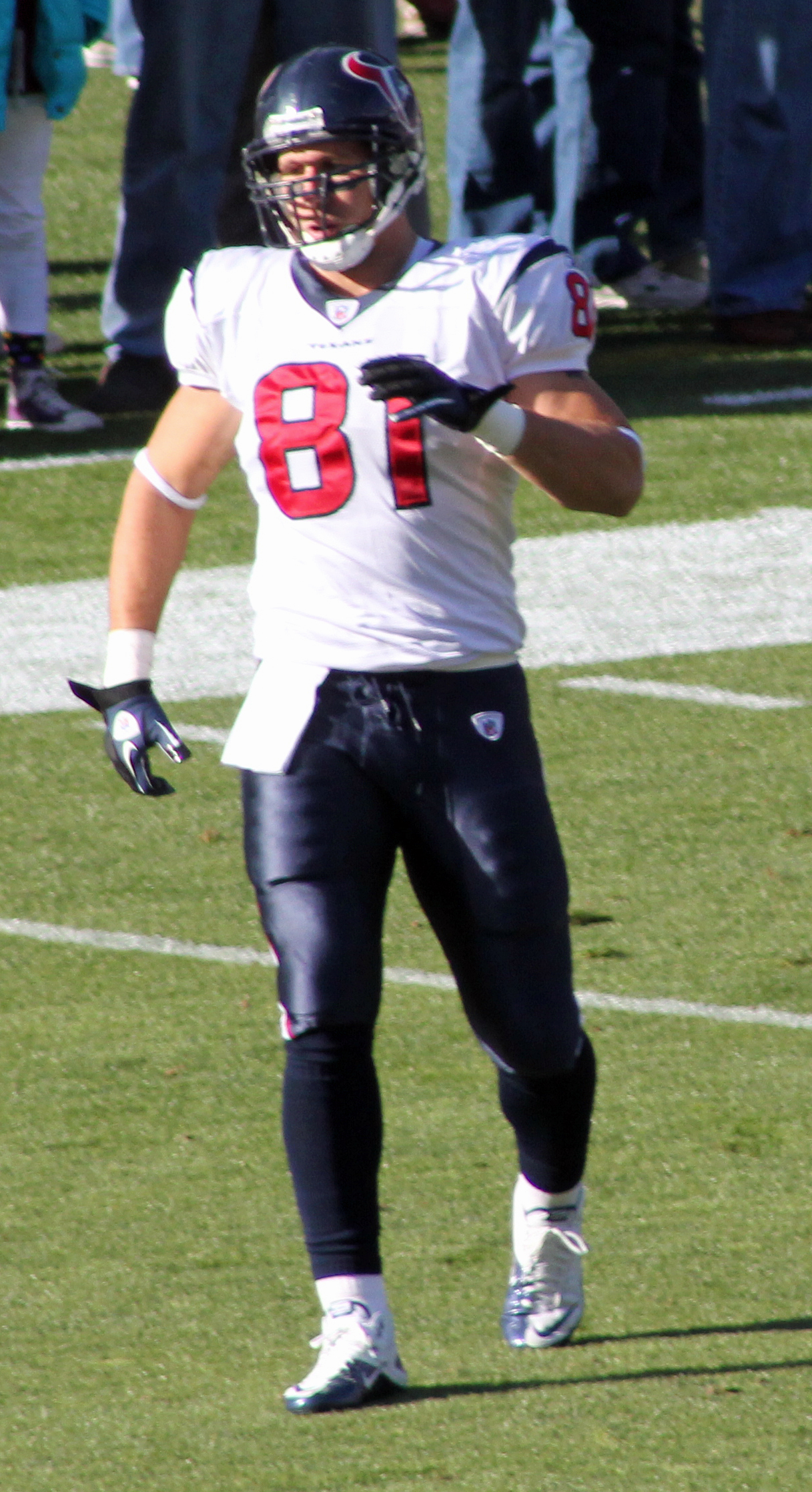
Owen Daniels was drafted 98th overall by the Houston Texans in the 2006 NFL draft.

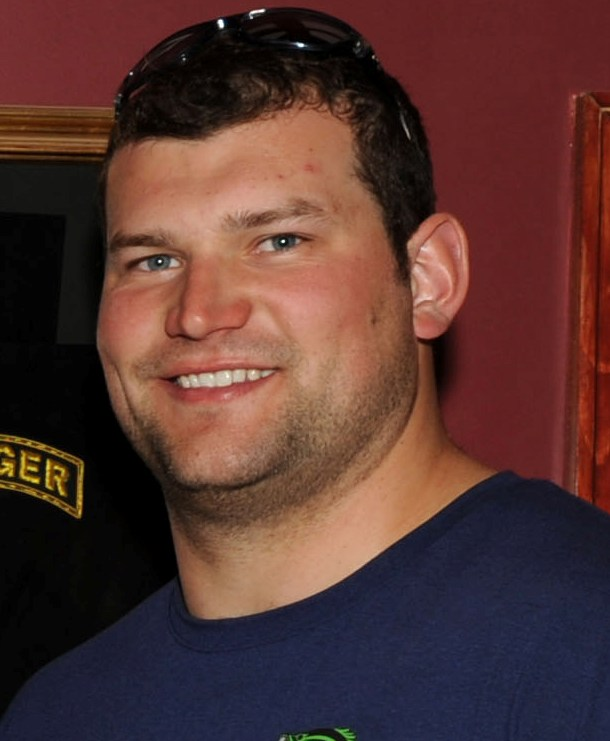
Joe Thomas was drafted 3rd overall by the Cleveland Browns in the 2007 NFL draft.

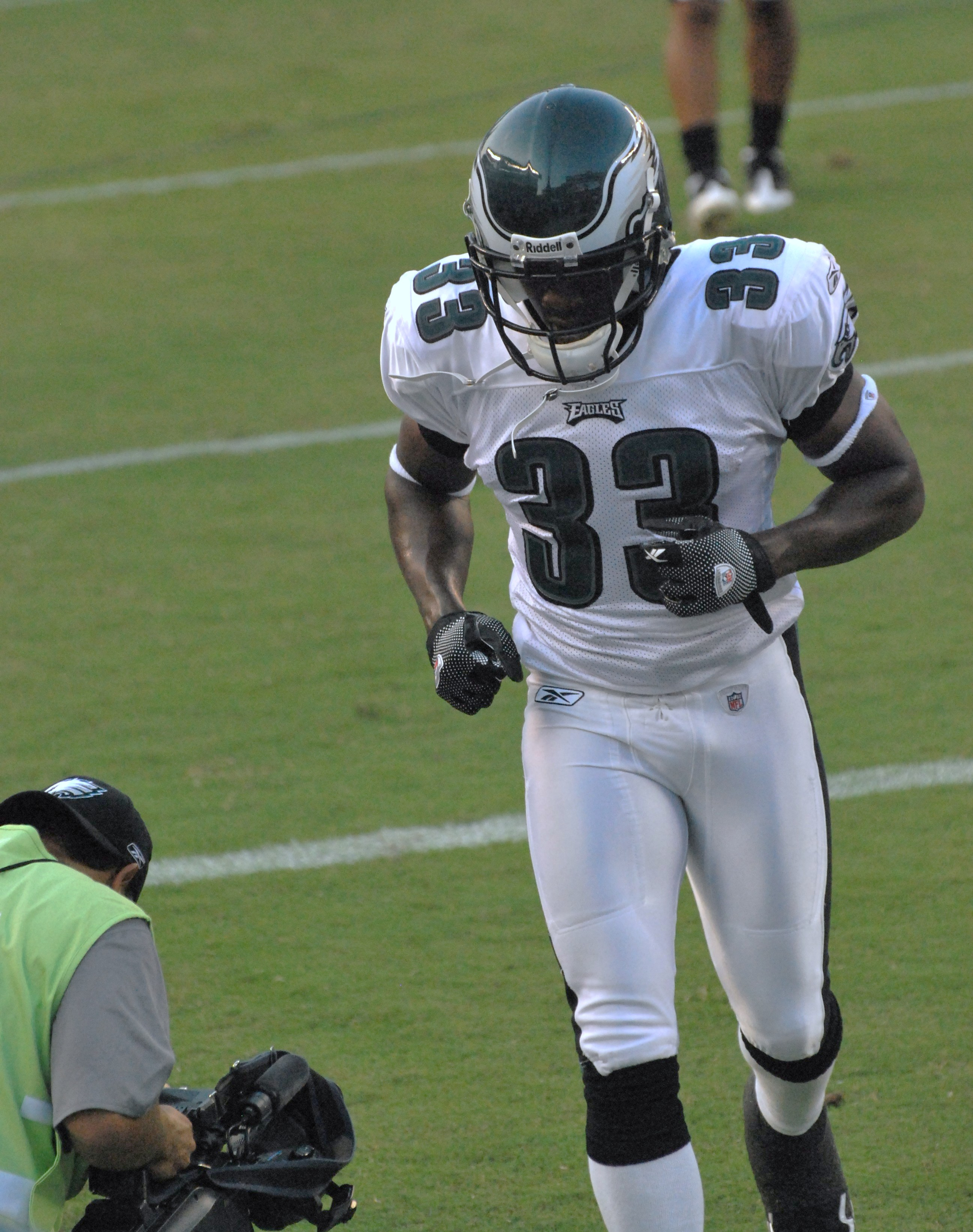
Jack Ikegwuonu was drafted 131st overall by the Philadelphia Eagles in the 2008 NFL draft.

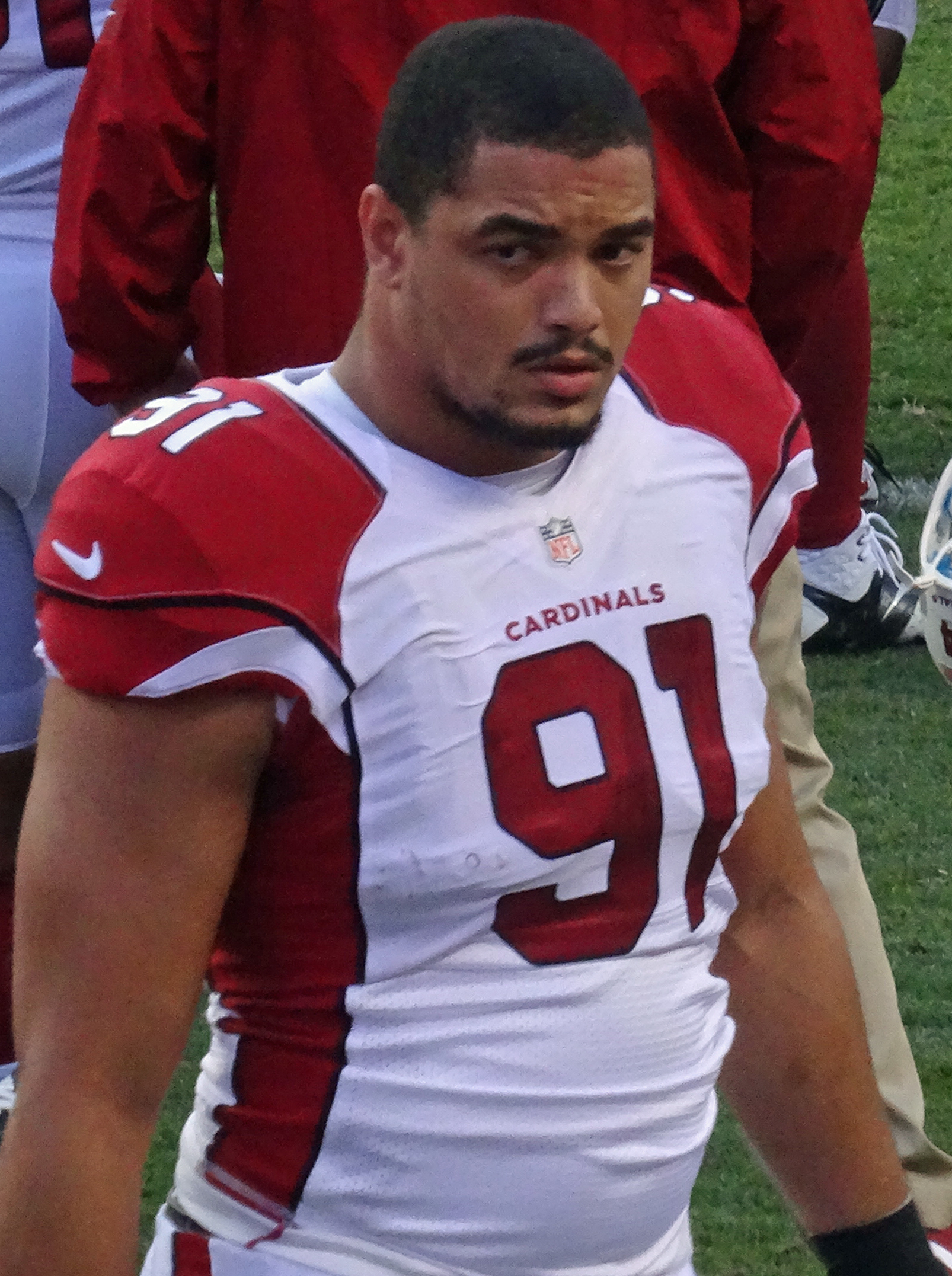
Matt Shaughnessy was drafted 71st overall by the Oakland Raiders in the 2009 NFL draft.

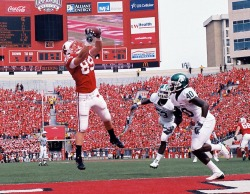
Garrett Graham was drafted 118th overall by the Houston Texans in the 2010 NFL draft.

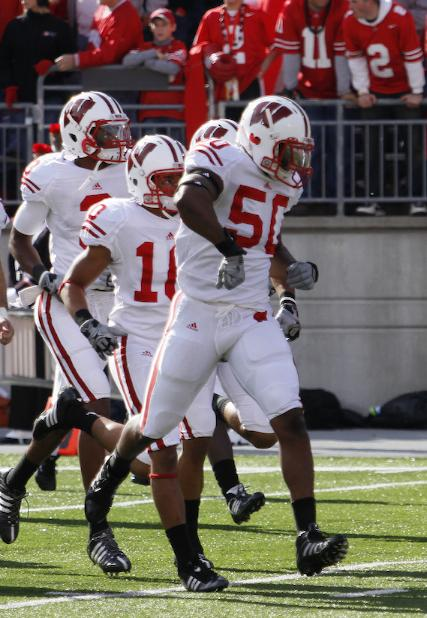
O'Brien Schofield (#50) was drafted 130th overall by the Arizona Cardinals in the 2010 NFL draft.

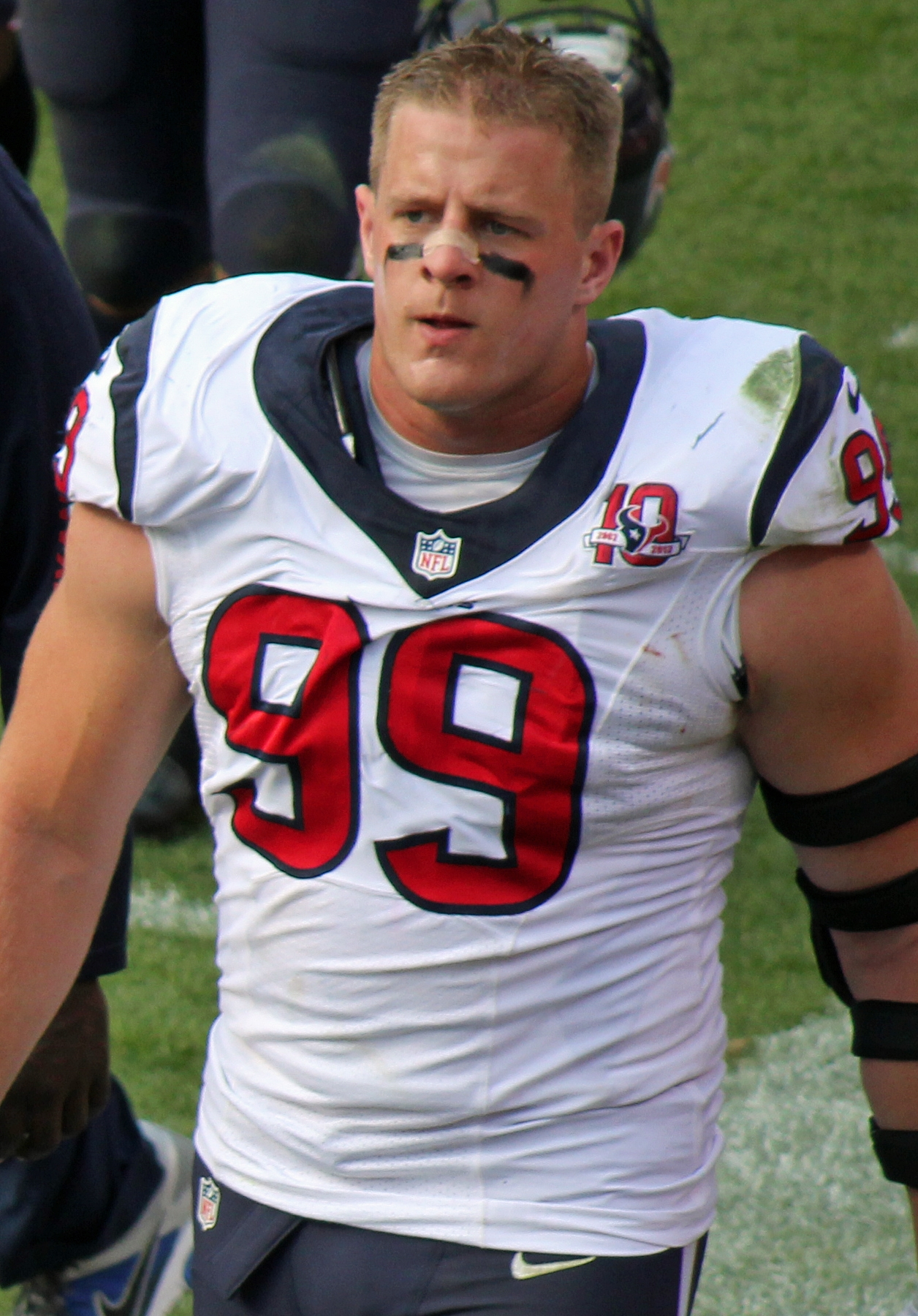
J. J. Watt was drafted 11th overall by the Houston Texans in the 2011 NFL draft.

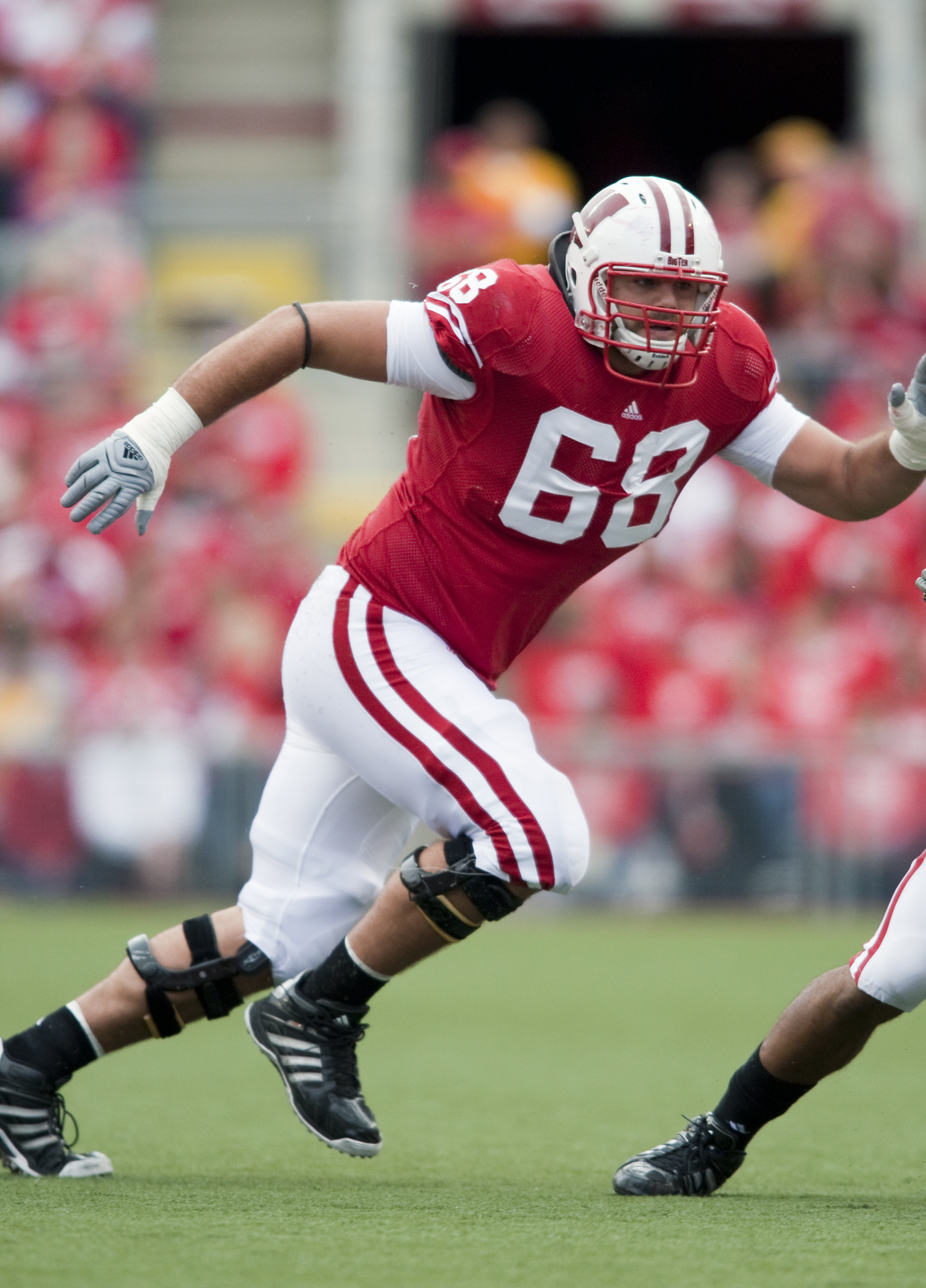
Gabe Carimi was drafted 29th overall by the Chicago Bears in the 2011 NFL draft.

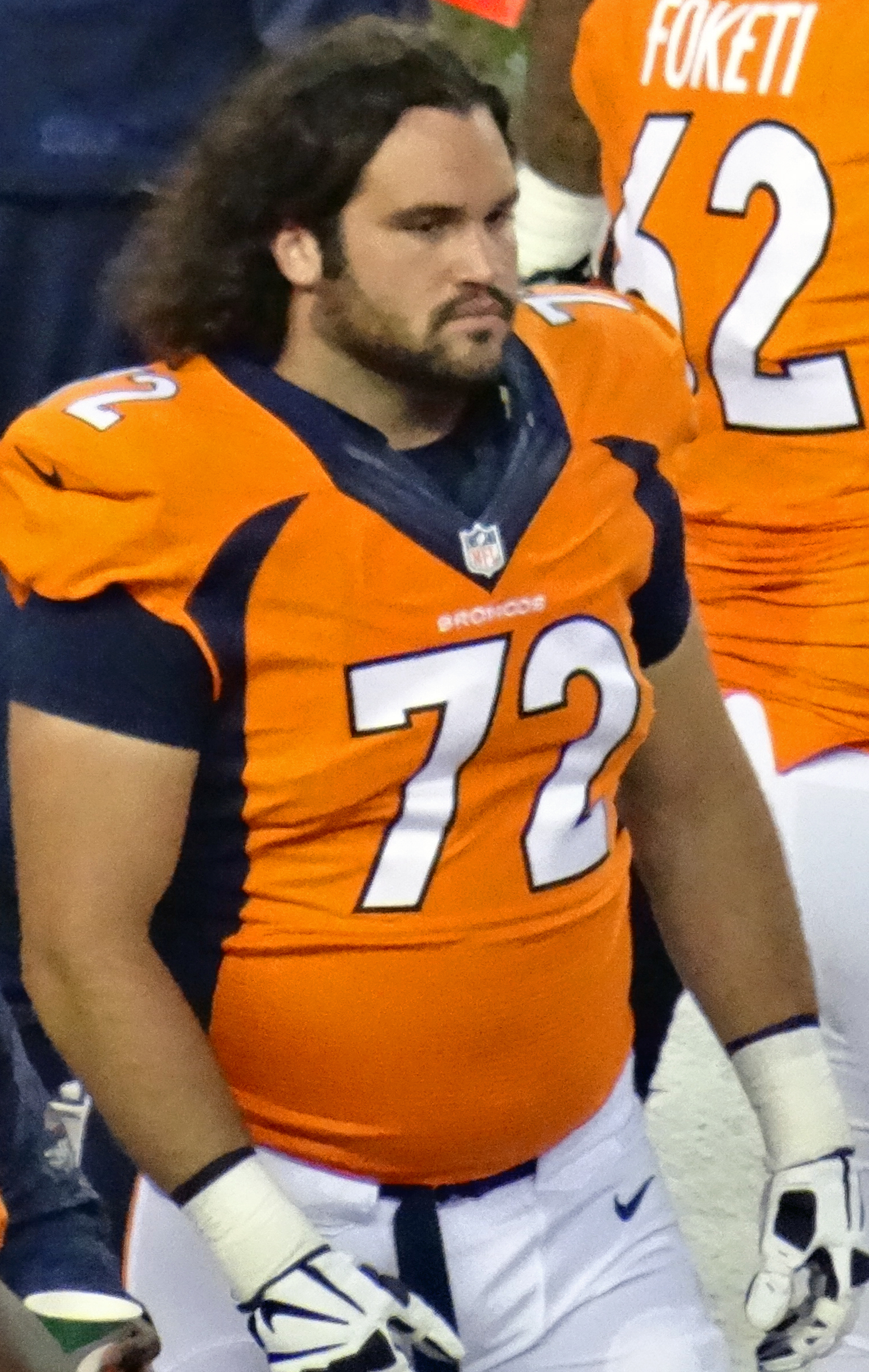
John Moffitt was drafted 75th overall by the Seattle Seahawks in the 2011 NFL draft.

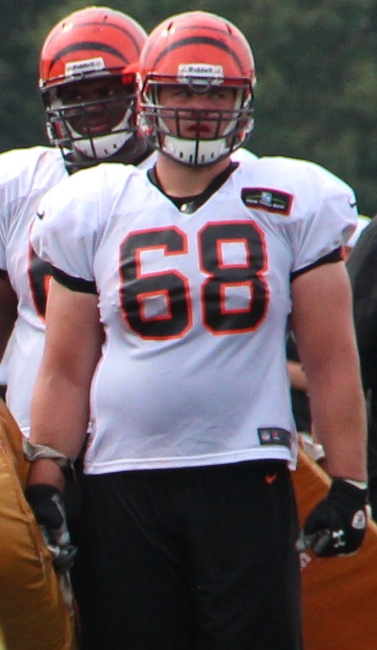
Kevin Zeitler was drafted 27th overall by the Cincinnati Bengals in the 2012 NFL draft.

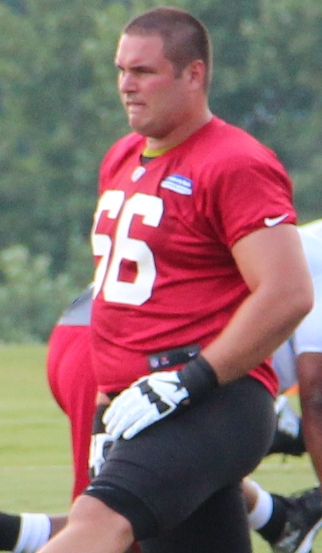
Peter Konz was drafted 55th overall by the Atlanta Falcons in the 2012 NFL draft.

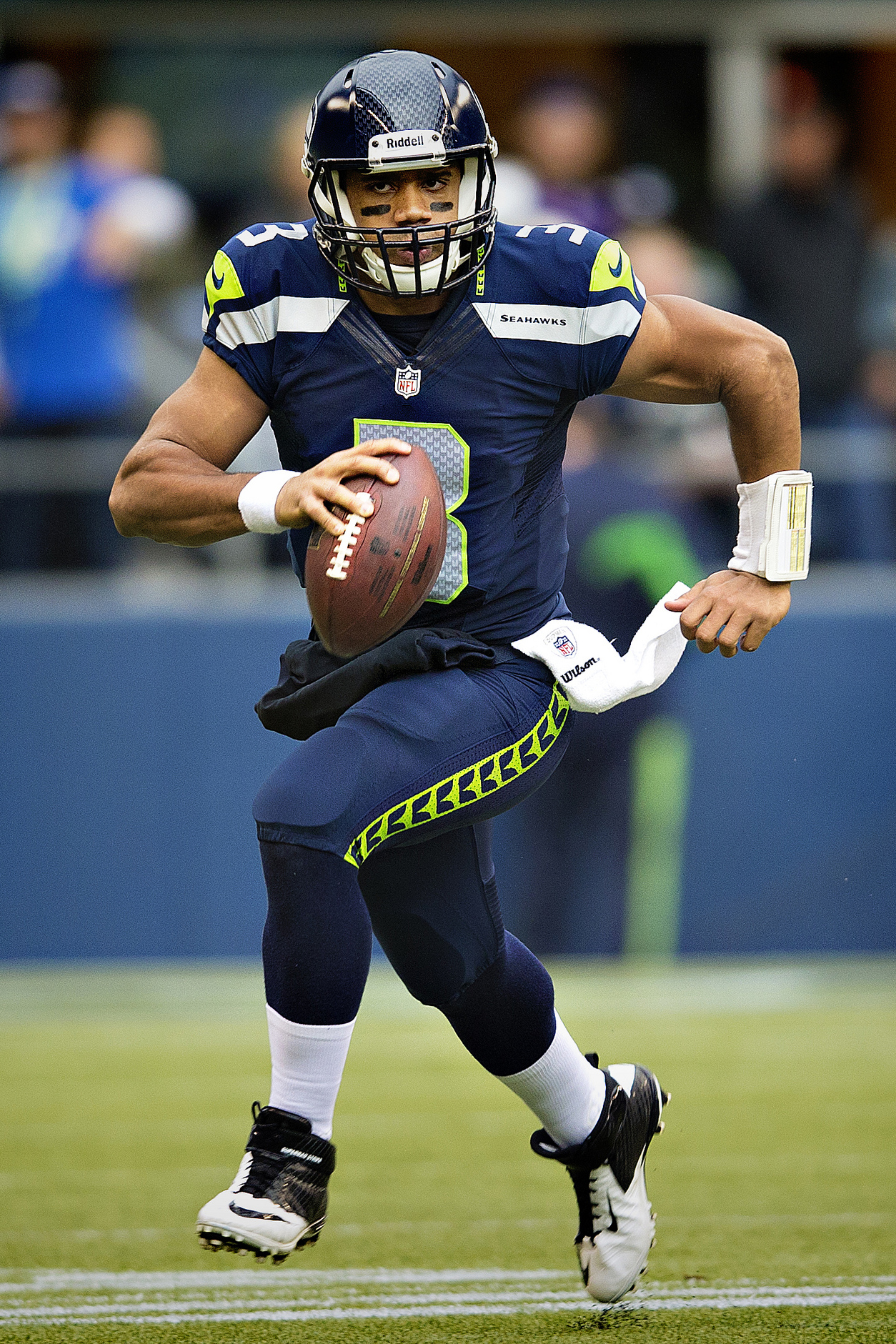
Russell Wilson was drafted 75th overall by the Seattle Seahawks in the 2012 NFL draft.

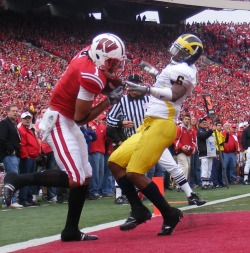
Nick Toon was drafted 122nd overall by the New Orleans Saints in the 2012 NFL draft.

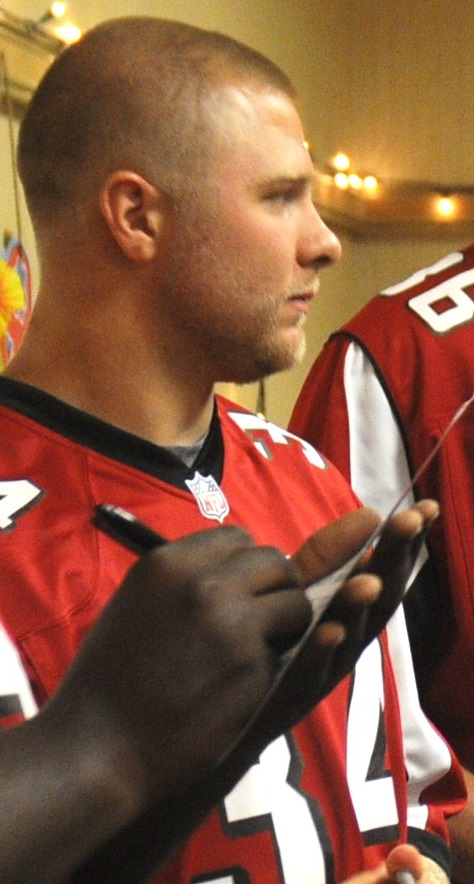
Bradie Ewing was drafted 157th overall by the Atlanta Falcons in the 2012 NFL draft.

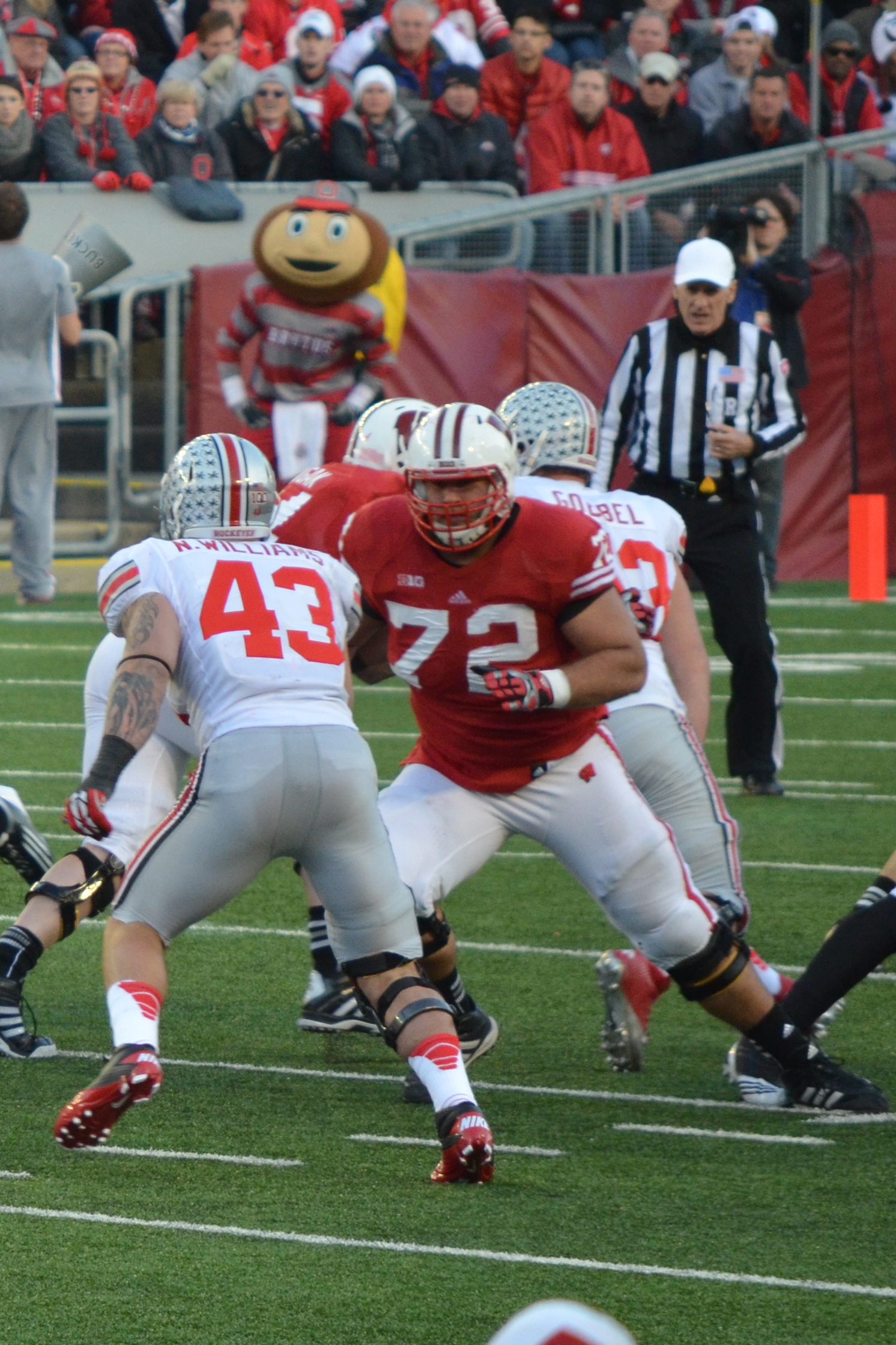
Travis Frederick was drafted 31st overall by the Dallas Cowboys in the 2013 NFL draft.

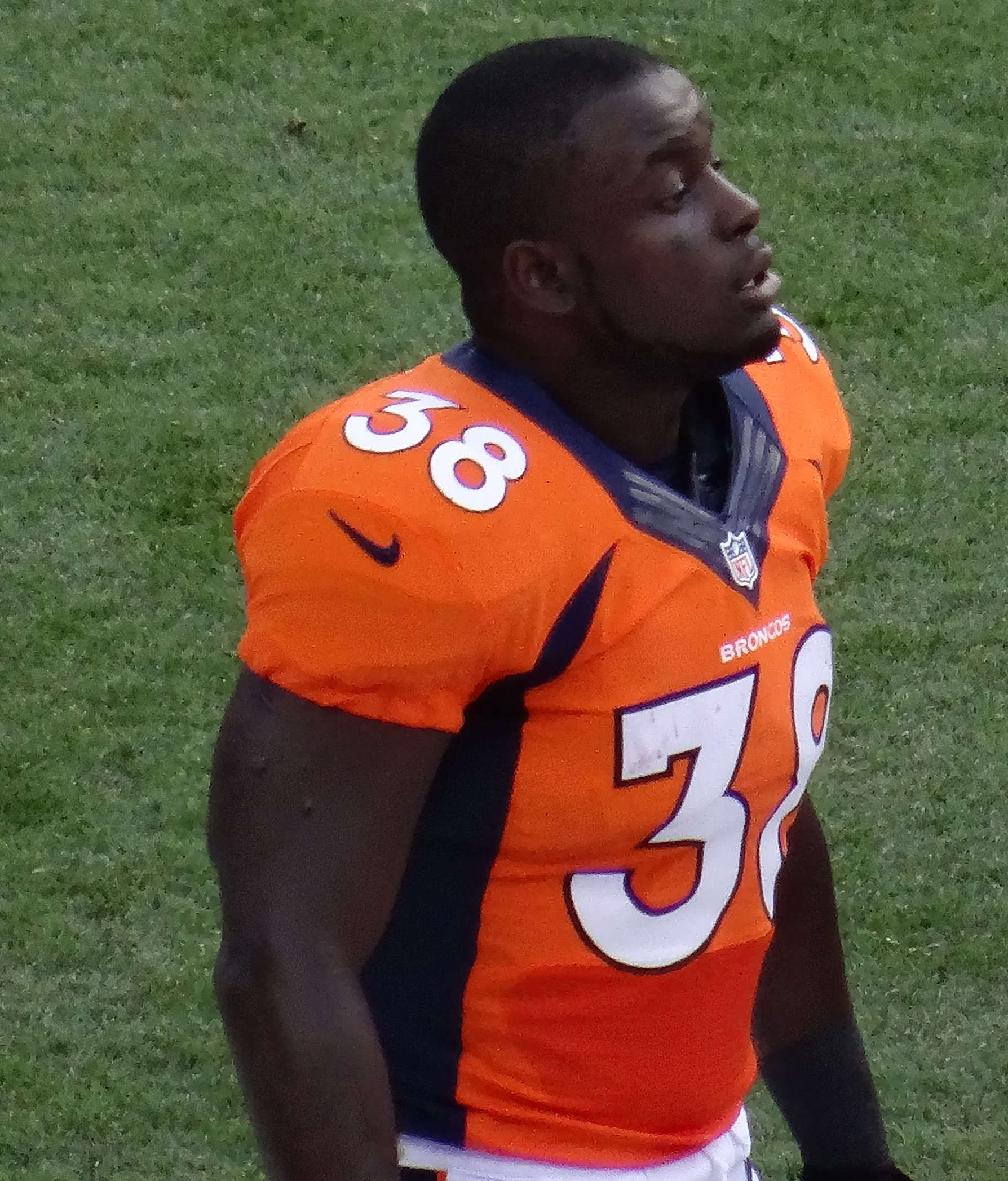
Montee Ball was the second Badger to be drafted in the 2013 NFL draft. Ball was drafted 58th overall by the Denver Broncos.

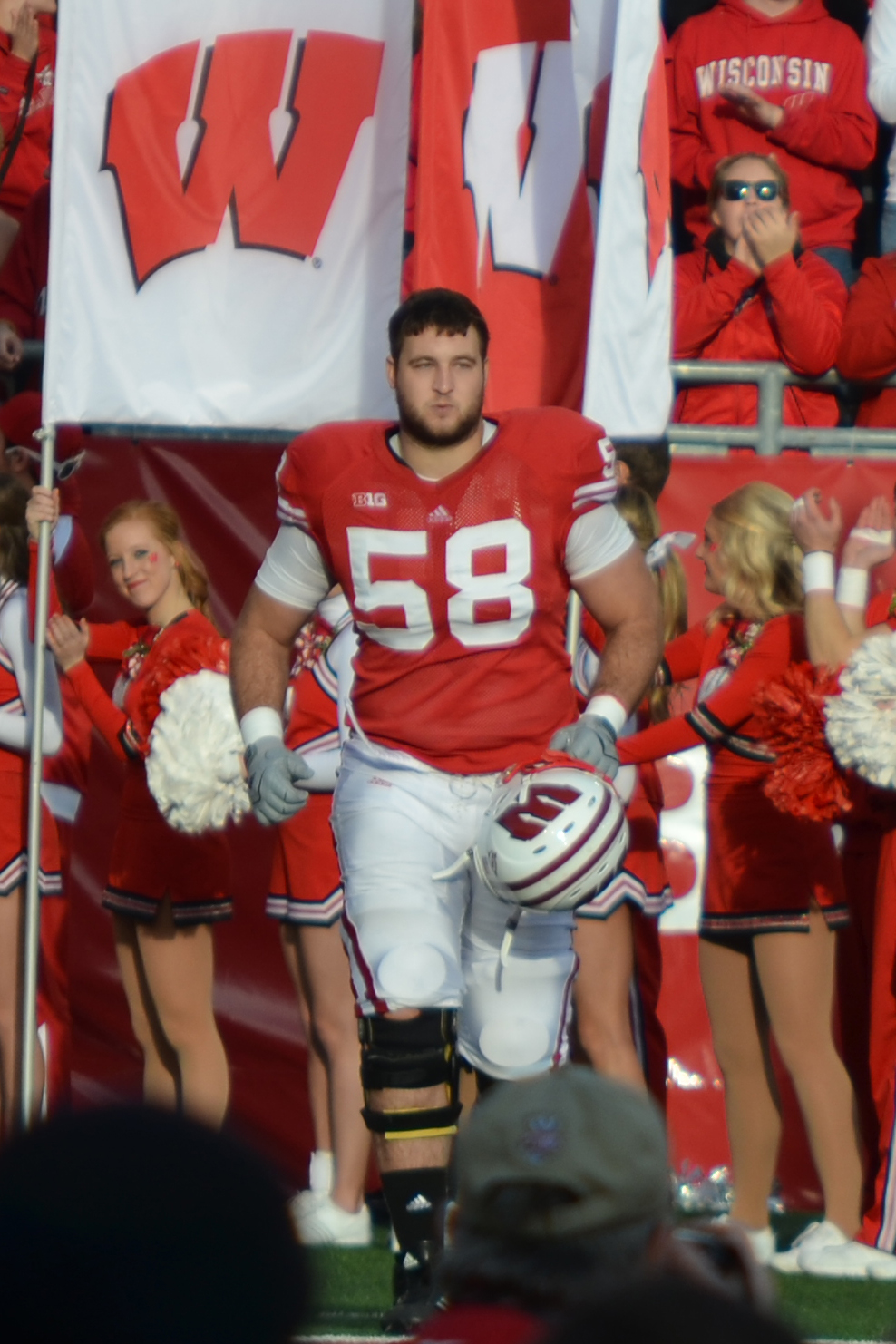
Ricky Wagner was drafted 168th overall by the Baltimore Ravens in the 2013 NFL draft.

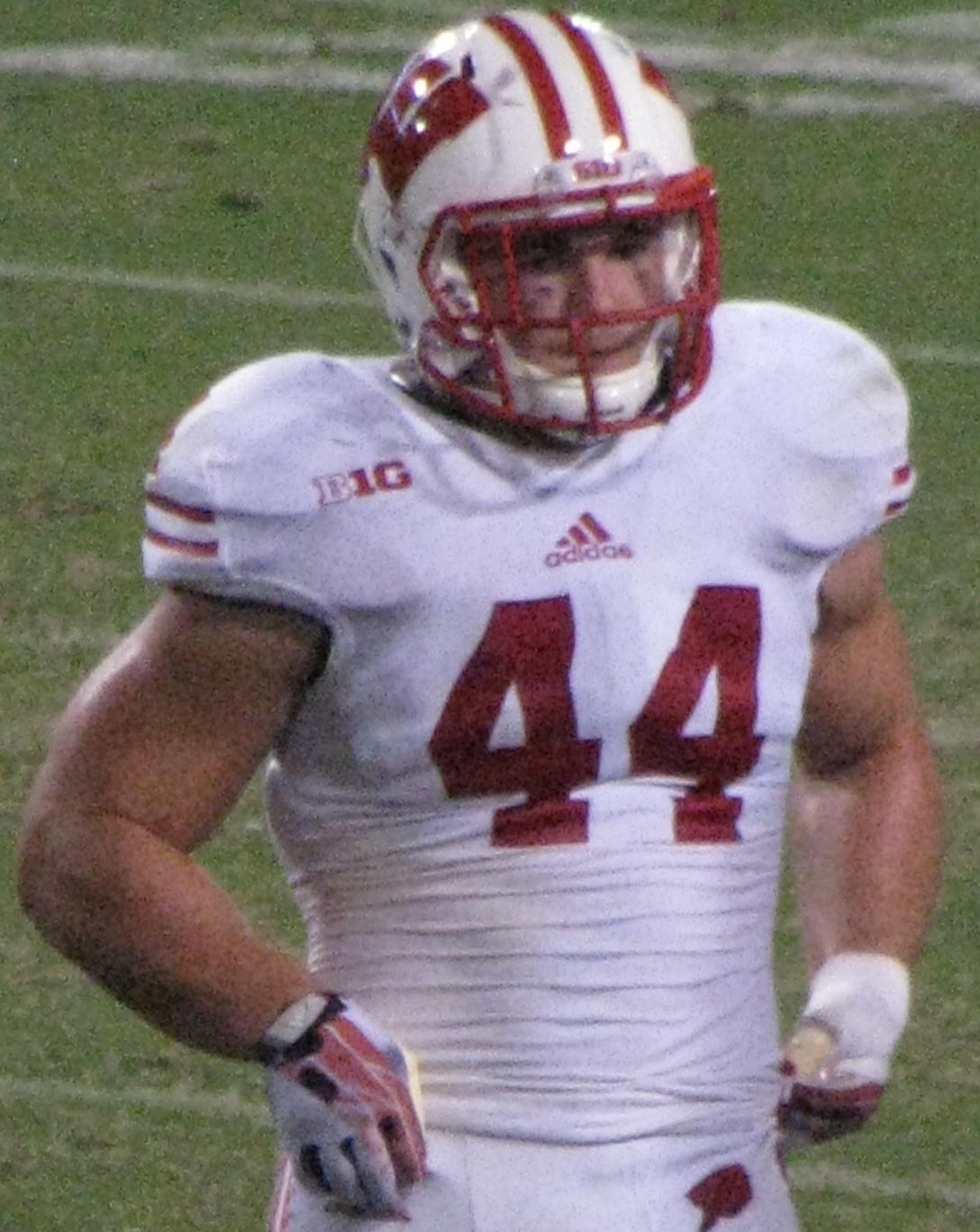
Chris Borland was drafted 77th overall by the San Francisco 49ers in the 2014 NFL draft.

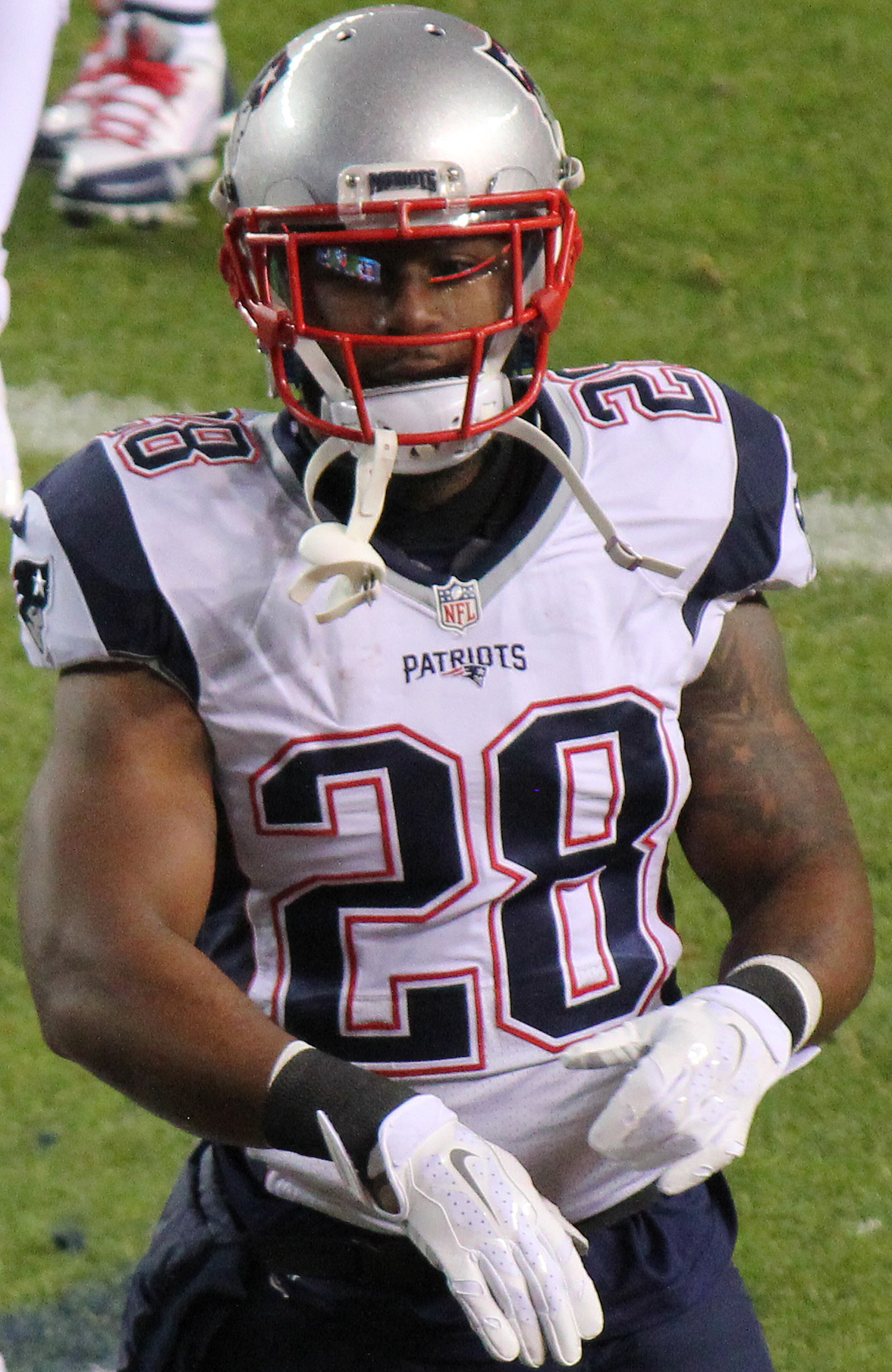
James White was drafted 130th overall by the New England Patriots in the 2014 NFL draft.

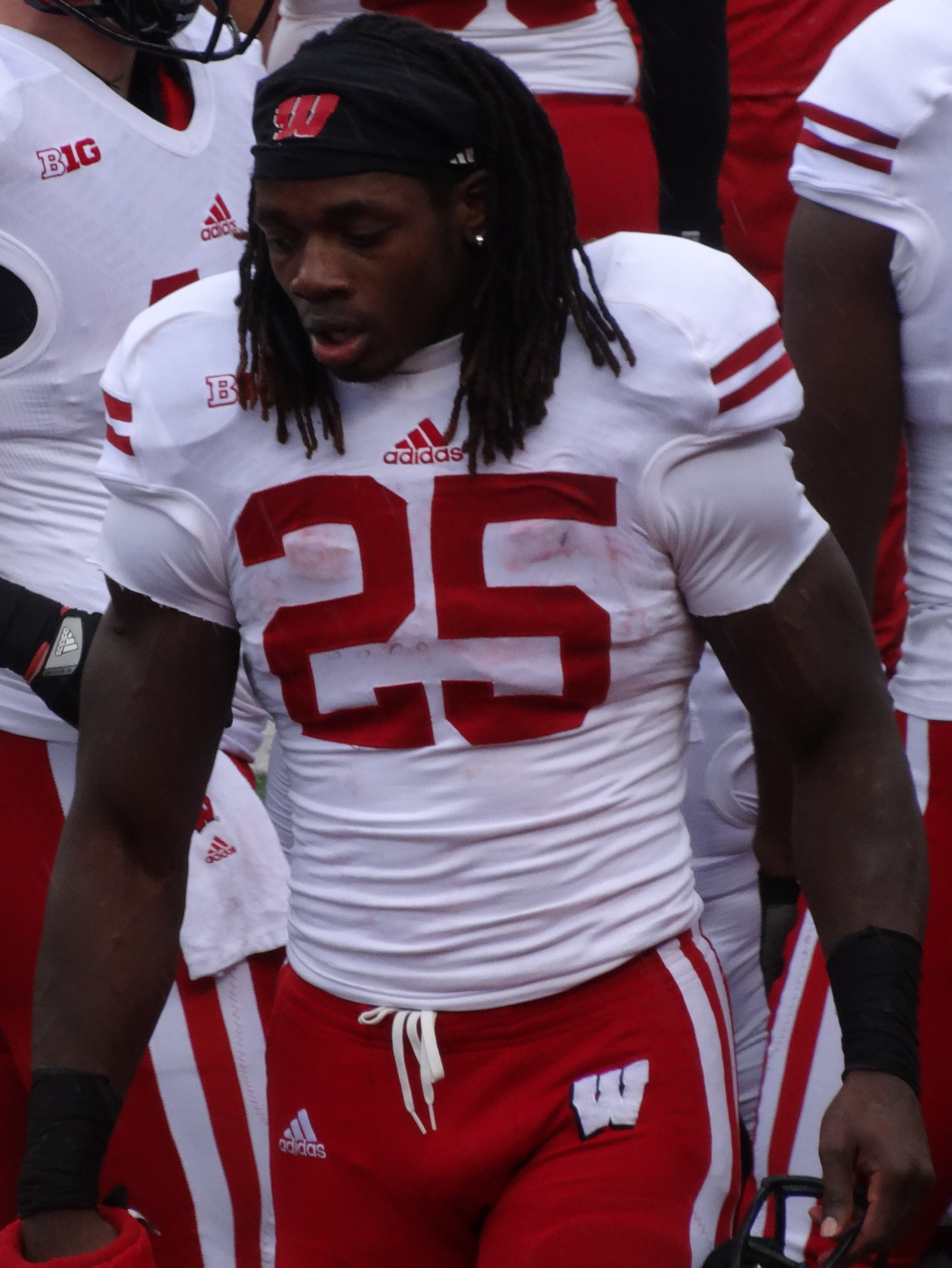
Melvin Gordon was drafted 15th overall by the San Diego Chargers in the 2015 NFL draft.

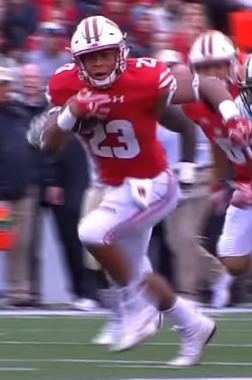
Jonathan Taylor was drafted 41st overall by the Indianapolis Colts in the 2020 NFL draft.

=== American Football League ===
Year	Round	Pick	Overall	Player	Team (Note: This is the team that drafted the player, not their most recent team.)	Position	Notes
1961	21	8	168	Ron Miller (Note: Ron Miller was drafted in the 1961 AFL Draft by the Houston Oilers (168th overall) and in the 1961 NFL Draft by the Los Angeles Rams (41st overall).)	Houston Oilers	QB	—
1961	27	2	210	Terry Huxhold	Boston Patriots	T	—
1963	10	6	78	Pat Richter (Note: Pat Richter was drafted in the 1963 AFL Draft by the Denver Broncos (78th overall) and in the 1963 NFL Draft by the Washington Redskins (7th overall).)	Denver Broncos	TE	—
1963	17	7	135	Tom Neumann (Note: Tom Neumann transferred to Northern Michigan.)	Boston Patriots	RB	—
1963	19	3	147	Gary Kroner (Note: Gary Kroner was drafted in the 1963 AFL Draft by the New York Jets (147th overall) and in the 1963 NFL Draft by the Green Bay Packers (93rd overall).)	New York Jets	DB	—
1963	21	3	163	Ron Vander Kelen	New York Jets	QB	—
1963	25	4	196	Ron Carlson	Buffalo Bills	E	—
1964	7	5	53	Roger Pillath (Note: Roger Pillath was drafted in the 1964 AFL Draft by the Buffalo Bills (53rd overall) and in the 1964 NFL Draft by the Los Angeles Rams (39th overall).)	Buffalo Bills	T	—
1964	10	3	75	Ken Bowman^{†} (Note: Ken Bowman was drafted in the 1964 AFL Draft by the New York Jets (75th overall) and in the 1964 NFL Draft by the Green Bay Packers (111th overall).)	New York Jets	C	NFL champion (1965), Super Bowl champion (I, II)
1964	25	1	193	Jim Jones (Note: Jimmy Jones was drafted in the 1964 AFL Draft by the Denver Broncos (193rd overall) and in the 1964 NFL Draft by the Chicago Bears (84th overall).)	Denver Broncos	WR	—
1965	8	1	57	Jon Hohman	Denver Broncos	G	—
1965	11	5	85	Al Piraino (Note: Al Piraino was drafted in the 1965 AFL Draft by the Kansas City Chiefs (85th overall) and in the 1965 NFL Draft by the Philadelphia Eagles (104th overall).)	Kansas City Chiefs	T	—
1966	14	8	126	Mike London	San Diego Chargers	LB	—

=== National Football League ===
Year	Round	Pick	Overall	Player	Team	Position	Notes
1937	1	9	9	Eddie Jankowski	Green Bay Packers	B	—
1937	6	3	53	John Golemgeske	Brooklyn Dodgers	T	—
1939	3	7	22	Howie Weiss	Detroit Lions	FB	—
1939	5	9	39	Lynn Hovland	Detroit Lions	G	—
1939	10	9	89	Vince Gavre	Green Bay Packers	B	—
1939	16	9	149	Roy Bellin	Green Bay Packers	B	—
1940	6	4	44	Jack Murray	Brooklyn Dodgers	C	—
1941	1	7	7	George Paskvan	Green Bay Packers	FB	—
1941	17	5	155	Fred Gage	Detroit Lions	B	—
1942	11	9	99	Tom Farris	Green Bay Packers	QB	—
1943	2	1	11	Dave Schreiner	Detroit Lions	E	College Football Hall of Fame
1943	12	4	104	Paul Hirsbrunner	Chicago Cardinals	T	—
1943	19	9	179	Pat Lyons	Chicago Bears	E	—
1943	21	8	198	Lloyd Wasserbach	Green Bay Packers	T	—
1943	22	8	208	Mark Hoskins	Green Bay Packers	B	—
1943	24	9	229	Bob Baumann	Chicago Bears	T	—
1943	26	8	248	George Makris	Green Bay Packers	G	—
1943	29	8	278	Dick Thornally	Green Bay Packers	T	—
1943	30	8	288	Bob Ray	Green Bay Packers	B	—
1944	1	2	2	Pat Harder^{*}	Card-Pitt	FB	Pro Bowl (1951, 1953), College Football Hall of Fame
1944	12	4	124	Bob Hanzlik	Philadelphia Eagles	E	—
1944	29	8	304	Pat Boyle	Chicago Bears	G	—
1944	30	4	311	Len Seelinger	Pittsburgh Steelers	G	—
1945	7	5	59	Fred Negus	Cleveland Rams	C	—
1945	7	10	64	Jack Mead	New York Giants	E	—
1945	15	10	152	Jack Wink	New York Giants	B	—
1945	21	6	214	Ken Currier	Detroit Lions	G	—
1945	29	7	303	Frank Lopp	Detroit Lions	T	—
1946	10	2	82	Rex John	Boston Yanks	T	—
1946	11	1	91	Dick Loepfe	Chicago Cardinals	T	—
1947	1	11	11	Don Kindt^{*}	Chicago Bears	DB	Pro Bowl (1954)
1947	15	8	133	George Fuchs	Los Angeles Rams	B	—
1947	17	10	155	Wally Dreyer (Note: Wally Dreyer transferred to Michigan.)	Chicago Bears	B	—
1947	20	5	180	Clarence Esser	Chicago Cardinals	E	—
1947	26	1	236	Earl Maves	Detroit Lions	B	—
1948	1	7	7	Jug Girard	Green Bay Packers	E	—
1948	12	6	101	Bob Rennebohm	Green Bay Packers	E	—
1948	12	10	105	Clarence Self	Chicago Cardinals	DB	—
1949	4	8	39	Ben Bendrick	Chicago Bears	B	—
1949	15	8	149	Hal Faverty	Chicago Bears	LB	—
1950	4	12	52	Red Wilson	Cleveland Browns	C	—
1950	13	6	163	Joe Kelly	New York Giants	C	—
1950	17	3	212	Hal Otterback	Green Bay Packers	G	—
1950	21	3	264	Gene Evans	Green Bay Packers	B	—
1951	15	4	175	John Simcic	Chicago Cardinals	G	—
1951	20	11	242	Bill Albright	New York Giants	G	—
1951	27	4	319	Ken Huxhold	Chicago Cardinals	G	—
1951	27	5	320	Bob Radcliffe	Pittsburgh Steelers	B	—
1951	30	1	352	Ed Withers	Green Bay Packers	B	—
1952	5	8	57	Pat O'Donahue	San Francisco 49ers	DE	—
1952	8	9	94	Jerry Smith^{†}	San Francisco 49ers	G	AFL Champion (1964, 1965 As a Coach)
1952	9	3	100	Deral Teteak^{*}	Green Bay Packers	LB	Pro Bowl (1952)
1952	10	1	110	Jim Hammond	Dallas Texans	B	—
1952	16	2	183	Johnny Coatta	Green Bay Packers	B	—
1952	19	1	218	Gene Felker	Dallas Texans	E	—
1953	6	6	67	Bob Kennedy	Green Bay Packers	G	—
1953	10	2	111	Charley Berndt	Chicago Cardinals	T	—
1953	14	4	161	Harland Carl	Chicago Bears	RB	—
1953	15	2	171	Dave Suminski	Washington Redskins	G	—
1954	12	4	137	Wendell Gulseth	New York Giants	T	—
1954	13	7	152	Roger Dornburg	Washington Redskins	B	—
1954	19	7	224	Jerry Witt	Washington Redskins	B	—
1954	30	5	354	Jim Haluska	Chicago Bears	QB	—
1955	1	3	3	Alan Ameche^{‡}	Baltimore Colts	FB	Pro Bowl (1956, 1957, 1958, 1959); NFL Champion (1958, 1959); College Football Hall of Fame
1955	2	4	17	Jim Temp	Green Bay Packers	DE	—
1955	6	4	65	Norm Amundsen	Green Bay Packers	G	—
1955	6	7	68	Ron Locklin	New York Giants	E	—
1955	12	10	143	Clarence Bratt	Chicago Bears	B	—
1955	21	6	247	Jerry Cvengros	Los Angeles Rams	T	—
1955	27	8	321	Bob Gingrass	Philadelphia Eagles	B	—
1956	6	9	70	John Dittrich	Chicago Cardinals	G	—
1956	7	4	77	Bob Konovsky	Chicago Cardinals	G	—
1956	14	7	164	Charlie Thomas	Green Bay Packers	B	—
1956	16	9	190	Wells Gray	Washington Redskins	G	—
1956	27	7	320	Dick Kolian	Green Bay Packers	E	—
1956	28	5	330	Jim Miller	Chicago Cardinals	QB	—
1957	12	12	145	Glen Bestor	Green Bay Packers	B	—
1957	27	3	316	Marty Booher	Green Bay Packers	T	—
1958	6	12	73	Dan Lewis	Detroit Lions	RB	—
1958	11	4	125	Rocco Cinelli	Chicago Bears	T	—
1958	11	8	129	Sid Williams	New York Giants	B	—
1959	10	11	119	Bob Zeman^{‡}	Cleveland Browns	DB	AFL All-Star (1962); Super Bowl Champion (XIAs a Coach)
1959	15	1	169	Dick Teteak	Green Bay Packers	G	—
1959	19	7	223	Dave Kocourek^{‡}	Pittsburgh Steelers	TE	AFL All-Star (1961, 1962, 1963, 1964); AFL Champion (1963, 1967)
1959	21	10	250	Jim Fraser^{*}	Cleveland Browns	LB	AFL All-Star (1962, 1963, 1964)
1959	27	3	315	Lowell Jenkins	Philadelphia Eagles	T	—
1960	5	3	51	Dale Hackbart^{†}	Green Bay Packers	DB	NFL Champion (1961)
1960	6	2	62	Jerry Stalcup	Los Angeles Rams	LB	—
1960	8	6	90	Dan Lanphear^{†}	Pittsburgh Steelers	DE	AFL Champion (1960)
1960	16	10	190	Jim Heineke	San Francisco 49ers	T	—
1960	20	7	235	Bob Nelson	Cleveland Browns	C	—
1961	3	13	41	Ron Miller	Los Angeles Rams	QB	—
1961	16	7	217	Tom Wiesner	Baltimore Colts	B	—
1962	7	4	88	Jim Bakken^{*}	Los Angeles Rams	K	Pro Bowl (1965, 1967, 1975, 1976)
1962	17	2	226	Ron Staley	Minnesota Vikings	E	—
1963	1	7	7	Pat Richter	Washington Redskins	TE	College Football Hall of Fame
1963	7	9	93	Gary Kroner	Green Bay Packers	DB	—
1964	3	11	39	Roger Pillath	Los Angeles Rams	T	—
1964	6	14	84	Jim Jones	Chicago Bears	WR	—
1964	8	10	108	Bob Johnson	St. Louis Cardinals	E	—
1964	8	13	111	Ken Bowman^{†}	Green Bay Packers	C	NFL Champion (1965), Super Bowl champion (I, II)
1965	7	2	86	Roger Jacobazzi	Green Bay Packers	T	—
1965	8	6	104	Al Piraino	Philadelphia Eagles	T	—
1965	16	12	222	Carl Silvestri	St. Louis Cardinals	DB	—
1965	17	14	238	Rick Reichardt	Baltimore Colts	RB	—
1965	20	3	269	Ralph Kurek	Chicago Bears	RB	—
1966	10	10	150	Tom Brigham	Detroit Lions	DE	—
1966	13	7	192	Bill Maselter	Detroit Lions	T	—
1968	10	22	268	Tom Domres	Houston Oilers	DT	—
1968	12	9	309	Sam Wheeler	Pittsburgh Steelers	LB	—
1969	9	10	218	Lynn Buss	Philadelphia Eagles	LB	—
1969	10	19	253	Tom McCauley	Minnesota Vikings	DB	—
1970	8	14	196	Mike McClish	Houston Oilers	T	—
1970	10	14	248	Joe Dawkins	Houston Oilers	RB	—
1970	10	25	259	Stu Voigt	Minnesota Vikings	TE	—
1971	3	25	77	Bill Gregory^{†}	Dallas Cowboys	DE	Super Bowl Champion (VI, XII)
1971	13	7	319	Dan Crooks	Atlanta Falcons	DB	—
1972	7	15	171	Lance Moon	Atlanta Falcons	RB	—
1972	9	25	233	Greg Johnson	Miami Dolphins	DB	—
1972	11	23	283	Elbert Walker	Kansas City Chiefs	T	—
1972	12	13	302	Larry Mialik	Atlanta Falcons	TE	—
1972	14	25	363	Alan Thompson	Dallas Cowboys	RB	—
1972	16	2	392	Neova Greyer	New York Giants	DB	—
1972	16	24	414	Neil Graff	Minnesota Vikings	QB	—
1972	16	25	415	Al Hannah	Miami Dolphins	WR	—
1973	12	11	297	Robert Storck	Los Angeles Rams	DT	—
1973	16	14	404	Rufus Ferguson	Atlanta Falcons	RB	—
1974	5	21	125	Mike Webster^{‡}	Pittsburgh Steelers	C	Pro Bowl (1978, 1979, 1980, 1981, 1982, 1983, 1984, 1985, 1987); Super Bowl Champion (IX, X, XIII, XIV); Pro Football Hall of Fame
1974	13	15	327	Mike Seifert	Cleveland Browns	DE	—
1975	12	15	301	Jack Novak	Cincinnati Bengals	TE	—
1976	1	8	8	Dennis Lick	Chicago Bears	T	—
1976	5	9	133	Steve Wagner	Minnesota Vikings	DB	—
1976	6	4	160	Terry Stieve	New Orleans Saints	G	—
1976	14	20	395	John Reimer	Houston Oilers	T	—
1977	10	25	276	John Rasmussen	New England Patriots	T	—
1979	2	12	40	Lawrence Johnson	Cleveland Browns	DB	—
1979	6	5	142	Ira Matthews^{†}	Oakland Raiders	RB	Super Bowl Champion (XV)
1980	1	22	22	Ray Snell	Tampa Bay Buccaneers	G	—
1980	3	27	83	Ray Sydnor	Pittsburgh Steelers	TE	—
1980	6	14	152	Tom Schremp	New York Jets	DE	—
1981	6	5	143	Dave Ahrens	St. Louis Cardinals	LB	—
1982	5	11	122	Von Mansfield	Atlanta Falcons	DB	—
1982	8	5	200	Jerry Doerger	Chicago Bears	C	—
1982	11	4	283	Guy Boliaux	Chicago Bears	LB	—
1982	12	9	315	Dave Levenick	Atlanta Falcons	LB	—
1983	5	14	126	Matt Vanden Boom	Buffalo Bills	DB	—
1983	6	5	145	Tim Stracka	Cleveland Browns	TE	—
1983	6	26	166	Bob Winckler	Washington Redskins	T	—
1983	8	10	206	David Greenwood	New Orleans Saints	DB	—
1983	10	6	257	Mark Shumate	Kansas City Chiefs	DT	—
1983	10	25	276	Tim Krumrie^{*}	Cincinnati Bengals	DT	Pro Bowl (1987, 1988)
1984	6	13	153	Randy Wright	Green Bay Packers	QB	—
1985	1	10	10	Al Toon^{*}	New York Jets	WR	Pro Bowl (1986, 1987, 1988)
1985	1	11	11	Richard Johnson	Houston Oilers	DB	—
1985	1	20	20	Darryl Sims	Pittsburgh Steelers	DE	—
1985	2	23	51	Scott Bergold	St. Louis Cardinals	T	—
1985	4	17	101	Dan Turk	Pittsburgh Steelers	C	—
1985	4	27	111	Jeff Dellenbach^{†}	Miami Dolphins	C	Super Bowl Champion (XXXI)
1985	7	14	182	Gary Ellerson	Green Bay Packers	RB	—
1985	7	18	186	Kevin Belcher	Los Angeles Raiders	T	—
1985	8	13	209	Ken Stills	Green Bay Packers	DB	—
1985	12	21	329	Bert Pearson	San Diego Chargers	TE	—
1985	12	22	330	Jim Melka	Tampa Bay Buccaneers	LB	—
1986	6	11	149	Bob Landsee	Philadelphia Eagles	C	—
1987	2	1	29	Nate Odomes^{*}	Buffalo Bills	DB	Pro Bowl (1992, 1993)
1987	2	15	43	Rick Graf	Miami Dolphins	LB	—
1987	4	23	107	Tim Jordan	New England Patriots	LB	—
1987	7	13	181	Michael Reid	Atlanta Falcons	LB	—
1987	9	1	224	Joe Armentrout	Tampa Bay Buccaneers	RB	—
1987	9	19	242	Craig Raddatz	Cincinnati Bengals	LB	—
1987	10	15	266	Bobby Taylor	Miami Dolphins	DB	—
1987	12	13	320	Larry Emery	Atlanta Falcons	RB	—
1988	1	4	4	Paul Gruber	Tampa Bay Buccaneers	T	—
1988	8	25	218	Glenn Derby	New Orleans Saints	T	—
1988	10	7	256	Bud Keyes	Green Bay Packers	QB	—
1988	10	18	267	Rodney Lossow	New England Patriots	C	—
1989	12	11	318	Todd Nelson	Phoenix Cardinals	G	—
1990	10	15	263	Craig Hudson	Kansas City Chiefs	TE	—
1991	3	12	67	Don Davey	Green Bay Packers	DT	—
1991	10	9	259	Brady Pierce	Minnesota Vikings	T	—
1992	1	7	7	Troy Vincent^{*}	Miami Dolphins	DB	Pro Bowl (1999, 2000, 2001, 2002, 2003)
1993	5	15	127	Chuck Belin	Los Angeles Rams	G	—
1994	3	12	77	Joe Panos	Philadelphia Eagles	G	—
1994	7	12	206	Mark Montgomery	Philadelphia Eagles	RB	—
1995	2	5	37	Cory Raymer	Washington Redskins	C	—
1995	2	19	51	Terrell Fletcher	San Diego Chargers	RB	—
1995	3	11	75	Mike Verstegen	New Orleans Saints	G	—
1995	4	3	101	Michael Roan	Houston Oilers	TE	—
1995	4	25	123	Mike Thompson	Jacksonville Jaguars	DT	—
1995	6	13	184	Lee DeRamus	New Orleans Saints	WR	—
1995	6	22	193	Kenny Gales	Chicago Bears	DB	—
1996	4	36	131	Eric Unverzagt	Seattle Seahawks	LB	—
1996	5	8	140	Jason Maniecki	Tampa Bay Buccaneers	DT	—
1997	2	7	37	Jerry Wunsch	Tampa Bay Buccaneers	T	—
1997	4	7	103	Pete Monty	New York Giants	LB	—
1997	4	26	122	Tarek Saleh	Carolina Panthers	LB	—
1998	2	22	52	Tony Simmons	New England Patriots	WR	—
1998	4	14	106	Donald Hayes	Carolina Panthers	WR	—
1999	1	27	27	Aaron Gibson	Detroit Lions	T	—
1999	3	22	83	Tom Burke	Arizona Cardinals	DE	—
1999	6	3	172	Cecil Martin	Philadelphia Eagles	FB	—
2000	1	11	11	Ron Dayne	New York Giants	RB	College Football Hall of Fame
2000	1	22	22	Chris McIntosh	Seattle Seahawks	T	—
2000	4	30	124	Bobby Myers	Tennessee Titans	DB	—
2000	7	18	224	Mark Tauscher^{†}	Green Bay Packers	T	Super Bowl Champion (XLV)
2001	1	26	26	Jamar Fletcher	Miami Dolphins	DB	—
2001	1	27	27	Michael Bennett^{*}	Minnesota Vikings	RB	Pro Bowl (2002)
2001	2	21	52	Chris Chambers^{*}	Miami Dolphins	WR	Pro Bowl (2005)
2001	3	30	92	Casey Rabach	Baltimore Ravens	C	—
2001	4	10	105	Bill Ferrario	Green Bay Packers	G	—
2001	6	19	182	Roger Knight	Pittsburgh Steelers	LB	—
2001	6	30	193	Jason Doering	Indianapolis Colts	DB	—
2001	7	30	230	Ross Kolodziej	New York Giants	DT	—
2002	1	12	12	Wendell Bryant	Arizona Cardinals	DT	—
2002	4	12	110	Mike Echols	Tennessee Titans	DB	—
2002	5	17	152	Nick Greisen	New York Giants	LB	—
2002	6	29	201	Mark Anelli	San Francisco 49ers	TE	—
2003	2	6	38	Al Johnson	Dallas Cowboys	C	—
2003	6	5	178	B. J. Tucker	Dallas Cowboys	DB	—
2003	6	27	200	Brooks Bollinger	New York Jets	QB	—
2003	7	2	216	Ben Johnson	Detroit Lions	T	—
2004	1	13	13	Lee Evans	Buffalo Bills	WR	—
2004	5	8	140	Alex Lewis	Detroit Lions	LB	—
2004	6	28	193	Jim Sorgi^{†}	Indianapolis Colts	QB	Super Bowl Champion (XLI)
2005	1	18	18	Erasmus James	Minnesota Vikings	DE	—
2005	3	23	87	Scott Starks	Jacksonville Jaguars	DB	—
2005	4	6	107	Dan Buenning	Tampa Bay Buccaneers	G	—
2005	5	12	148	Jonathan Welsh	Indianapolis Colts	DE	—
2005	6	1	175	Anttaj Hawthorne	Oakland Raiders	DT	—
2005	6	19	193	Jason Jefferson	New Orleans Saints	DT	—
2005	7	26	243	Anthony Davis	Indianapolis Colts	RB	—
2006	3	10	74	Brian Calhoun	Detroit Lions	RB	—
2006	3	20	84	Brandon Williams	San Francisco 49ers	WR	—
2006	4	1	98	Owen Daniels^{*}	Houston Texans	TE	Pro Bowl (2008, 2012); Super Bowl Champion (50)
2006	5	17	150	Jason Pociask	New York Jets	TE	—
2006	6	3	172	Jonathan Orr	Tennessee Titans	WR	—
2007	1	3	3	Joe Thomas^{*}	Cleveland Browns	T	Pro Bowl (2007, 2008, 2009, 2010, 2011, 2012, 2013, 2014, 2015, 2016); Pro Football Hall of Fame
2008	4	32	131	Jack Ikegwuonu	Philadelphia Eagles	DB	—
2008	6	12	178	Taylor Mehlhaff	New Orleans Saints	K	—
2008	6	15	181	Nick Hayden	Carolina Panthers	DT	—
2008	6	25	191	Paul Hubbard	Cleveland Browns	WR	—
2009	3	7	71	Matt Shaughnessy	Oakland Raiders	DE	—
2009	3	12	76	DeAndre Levy	Detroit Lions	LB	—
2009	3	15	79	Kraig Urbik	Pittsburgh Steelers	G	—
2009	3	36	100	Travis Beckum^{†}	New York Giants	TE	Super Bowl Champion (XLVI)
2010	4	20	118	Garrett Graham	Houston Texans	TE	—
2010	4	32	130	O'Brien Schofield^{†}	Arizona Cardinals	DE	Super Bowl Champion (XLVIII)
2011	1	11	11	J. J. Watt^{*} (Note: J. J. Watt transferred from Central Michigan.)	Houston Texans	DE	Pro Bowl (2012, 2013, 2014, 2015, 2018)
2011	1	29	29	Gabe Carimi	Chicago Bears	T	—
2011	2	15	47	Lance Kendricks	St. Louis Rams	TE	—
2011	3	11	75	John Moffitt	Seattle Seahawks	G	—
2011	7	49	252	Bill Nagy	Dallas Cowboys	C	—
2012	1	27	27	Kevin Zeitler	Cincinnati Bengals	G	—
2012	2	23	55	Peter Konz	Atlanta Falcons	C	—
2012	3	12	75	Russell Wilson^{‡}	Seattle Seahawks	QB	Pro Bowl (2012, 2013, 2014, 2015, 2017, 2018, 2019, 2020, 2021, 2024); Super Bowl Champion (XLVIII)
2012	4	27	122	Nick Toon	New Orleans Saints	WR	—
2012	5	22	157	Bradie Ewing	Atlanta Falcons	FB	—
2012	6	37	207	Brad Nortman	Carolina Panthers	P	—
2013	1	31	31	Travis Frederick	Dallas Cowboys	C	Pro Bowl (2014, 2015, 2016, 2017, 2019)
2013	2	26	58	Montee Ball	Denver Broncos	RB	—
2013	5	35	168	Ricky Wagner	Baltimore Ravens	T	—
2014	3	4	68	Dezmen Southward	Atlanta Falcons	DB	—
2014	3	13	77	Chris Borland	San Francisco 49ers	LB	—
2014	4	30	130	James White	New England Patriots	RB	Super Bowl champion (XLIX, LI, LIII)
2014	5	36	176	Jared Abbrederis	Green Bay Packers	WR	—
2014	7	9	224	Beau Allen	Philadelphia Eagles	DT	Super Bowl Champion (LII)
2015	1	15	15	Melvin Gordon	San Diego Chargers	RB	Pro Bowl (2016, 2018); Super Bowl Champion (LVII)
2015	2	25	57	Rob Havenstein	St. Louis Rams	T	Super Bowl Champion (LVI)
2016	4	1	99	Joe Schobert	Cleveland Browns	LB	Pro Bowl (2017)
2016	6	23	198	Derek Watt	San Diego Chargers	FB	—
2017	1	30	30	T. J. Watt	Pittsburgh Steelers	LB	Pro Bowl (2018, 2019, 2020, 2021, 2022, 2023, 2024, 2025)
2017	1	32	32	Ryan Ramczyk	New Orleans Saints	T	—
2017	4	1	108	Vince Biegel	Green Bay Packers	LB	—
2018	4	10	110	Nick Nelson	Oakland Raiders	DB	—
2018	5	19	156	Troy Fumagalli	Denver Broncos	TE	—
2018	5	27	164	Natrell Jamerson	New Orleans Saints	DB	—
2018	6	28	202	Jack Cichy	Tampa Bay Buccaneers	LB	Super Bowl Champion (LV)
2018	7	12	230	Leon Jacobs	Jacksonville Jaguars	LB	—
2019	3	14	78	Michael Deiter	Miami Dolphins	G	—
2019	5	5	143	Ryan Connelly	New York Giants	LB	—
2019	5	13	151	Andrew Van Ginkel	Miami Dolphins	LB	Pro Bowl (2024)
2019	5	31	169	David Edwards	Los Angeles Rams	G	Super Bowl Champion (LVI)
2020	2	9	41	Jonathan Taylor	Indianapolis Colts	RB	Pro Bowl (2021, 2024, 2025)
2020	3	10	74	Zack Baun^{*}	New Orleans Saints	LB	Pro Bowl (2024, 2025); Super Bowl Champion (LIX)
2020	4	40	146	Tyler Biadasz	Dallas Cowboys	C	Pro Bowl (2022)
2020	5	21	166	Quintez Cephus	Detroit Lions	WR	—
2021	5	12	156	Isaiahh Loudermilk	Pittsburgh Steelers	DT	—
2021	6	29	213	Rachad Wildgoose	Buffalo Bills	DB	—
2021	6	30	214	Cole Van Lanen	Green Bay Packers	G	—
2022
2022	3	39	103	Leo Chenal	Kansas City Chiefs	LB	Super Bowl Champion (LVII, LVIII)
2022	3	40	104	Logan Bruss	Los Angeles Rams	G	—
2022	4	24	129	Jake Ferguson	Dallas Cowboys	TE	Pro Bowl (2023)
2022	6	27	206	Matt Henningsen	Denver Broncos	DT	—
2022	7	11	232	Faion Hicks	Denver Broncos	DB	—
2023
2023	2	12	43	Joe Tippmann	New York Jets	C	—
2023	2	18	49	Keeanu Benton	Pittsburgh Steelers	DT	—
2023	4	30	132	Nick Herbig	Pittsburgh Steelers	LB	—
2024
2024	4	17	117	Tanor Bortolini	Indianapolis Colts	C	—
2024	4	34	134	Braelon Allen	New York Jets	RB	—
2025
2025	7	2	218	Jack Nelson	Atlanta Falcons	T	—
2025	7	16	232	Hunter Wohler	Indianapolis Colts	DB	—

== Notable undrafted players ==
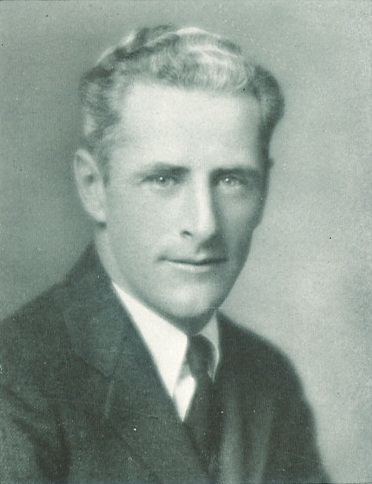
Rollie Williams played in 1923 for the Racine Legion

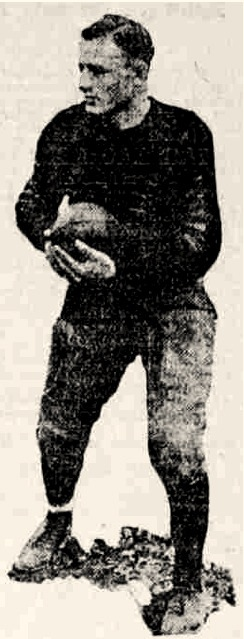
Gus Tebell played in 1923 and 1924 for the Columbus Tigers

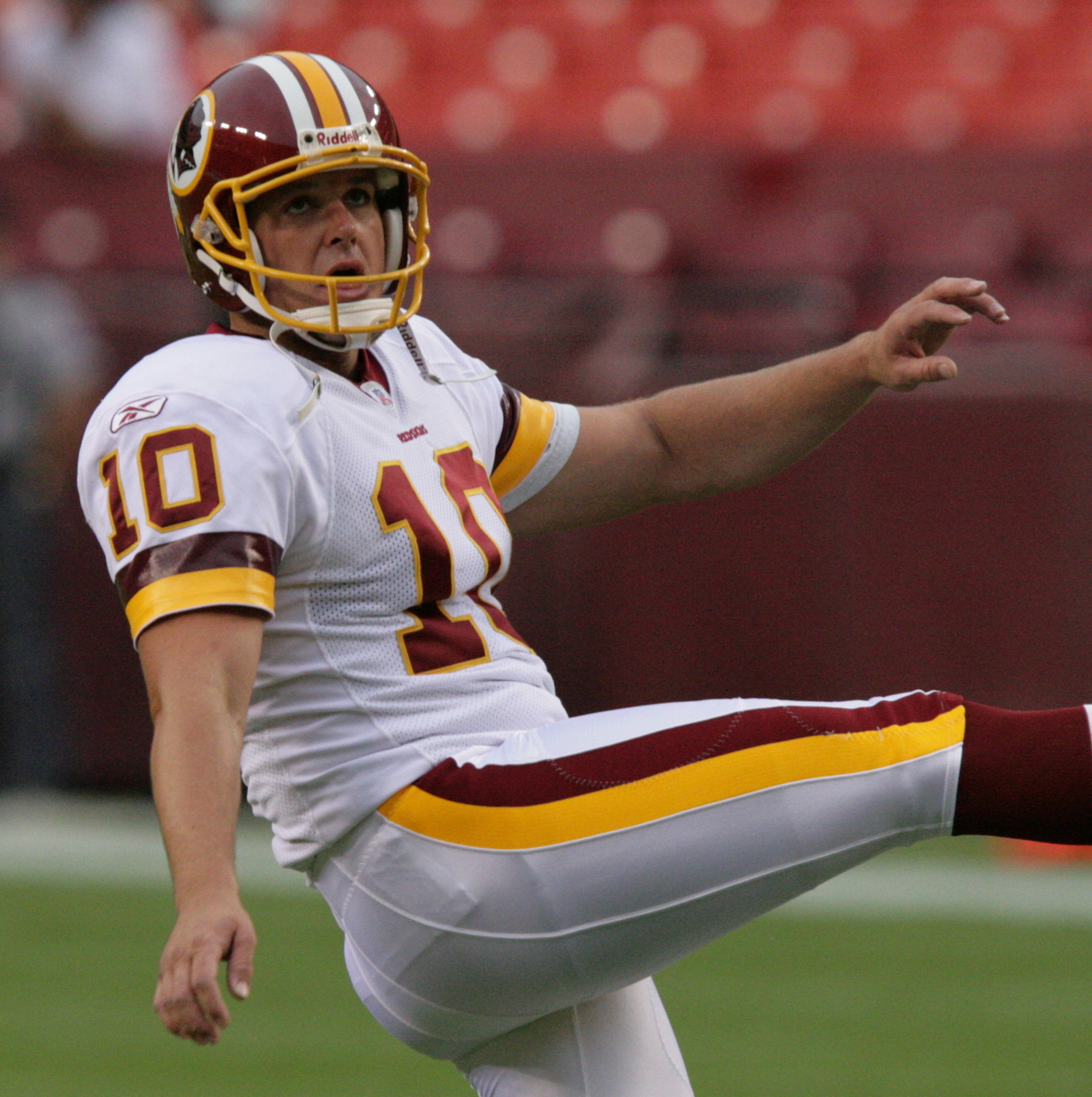
John Hall was undrafted in 1997 but signed with the New York Jets

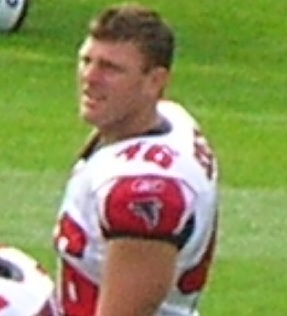
Mike Schneck was undrafted in 1999 but signed with the Pittsburgh Steelers

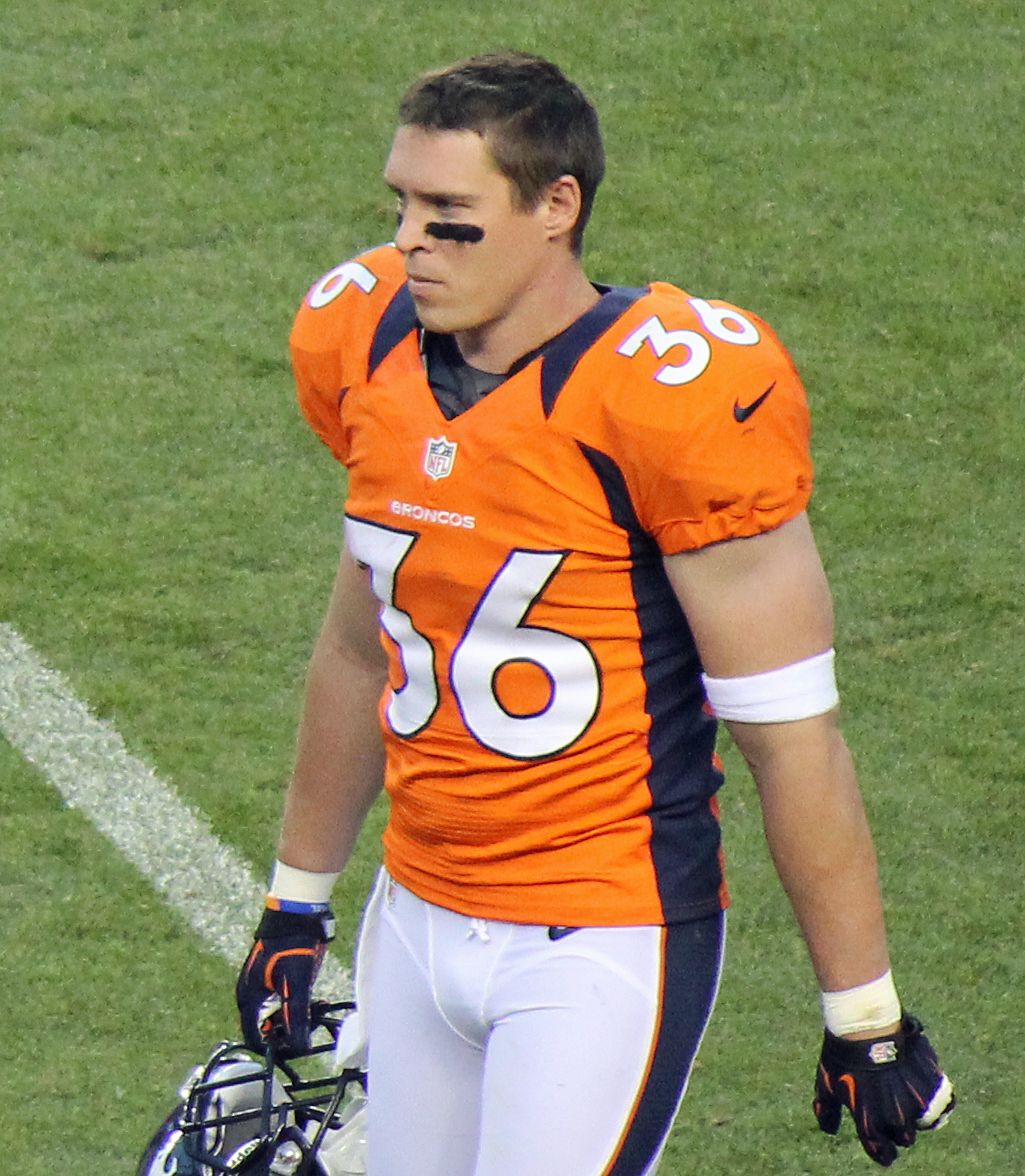
Jim Leonhard was undrafted in 2005 but signed with the Buffalo Bills

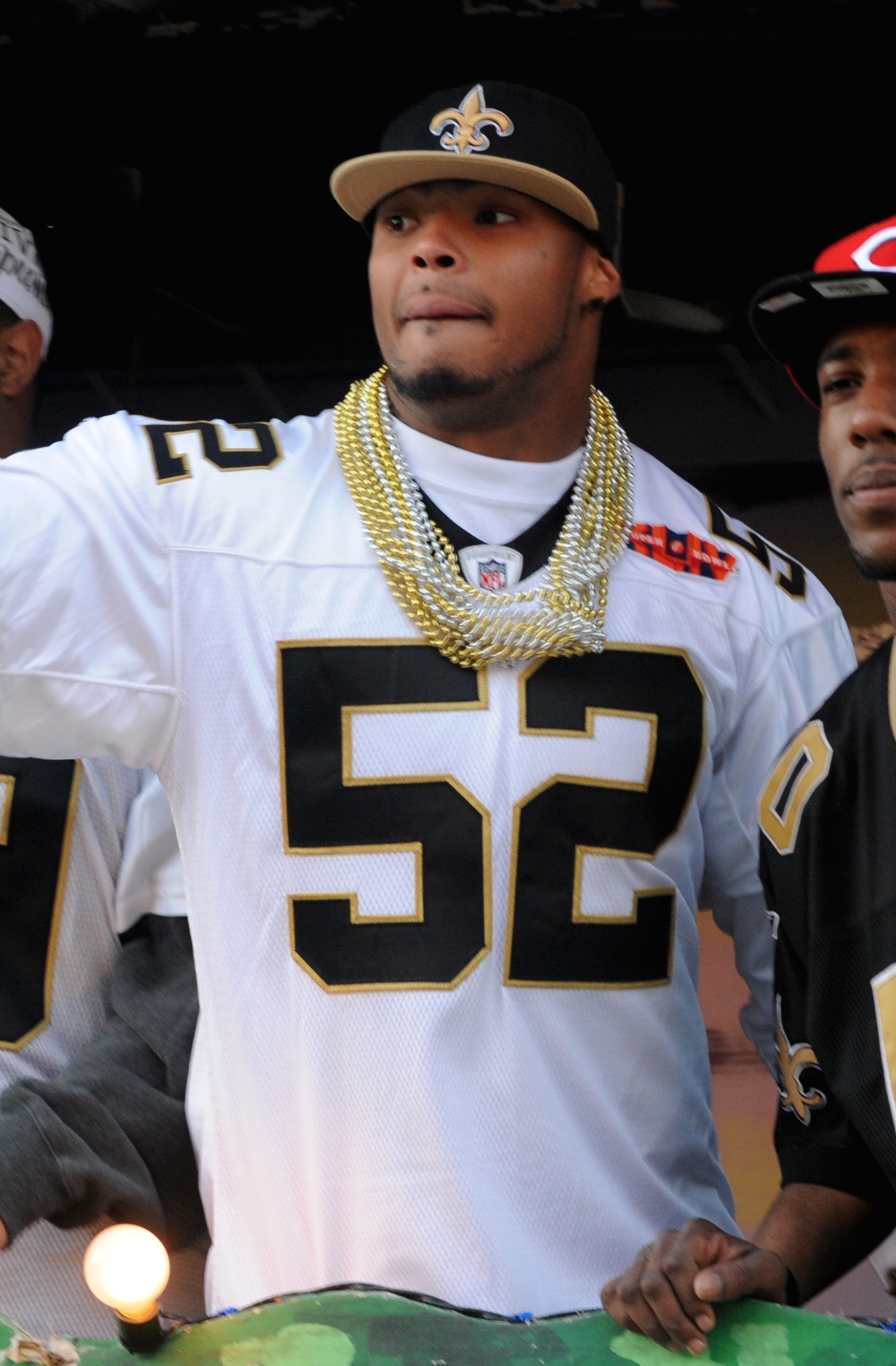
Jonathan Casillas was undrafted in 2009 but signed with the New Orleans Saints

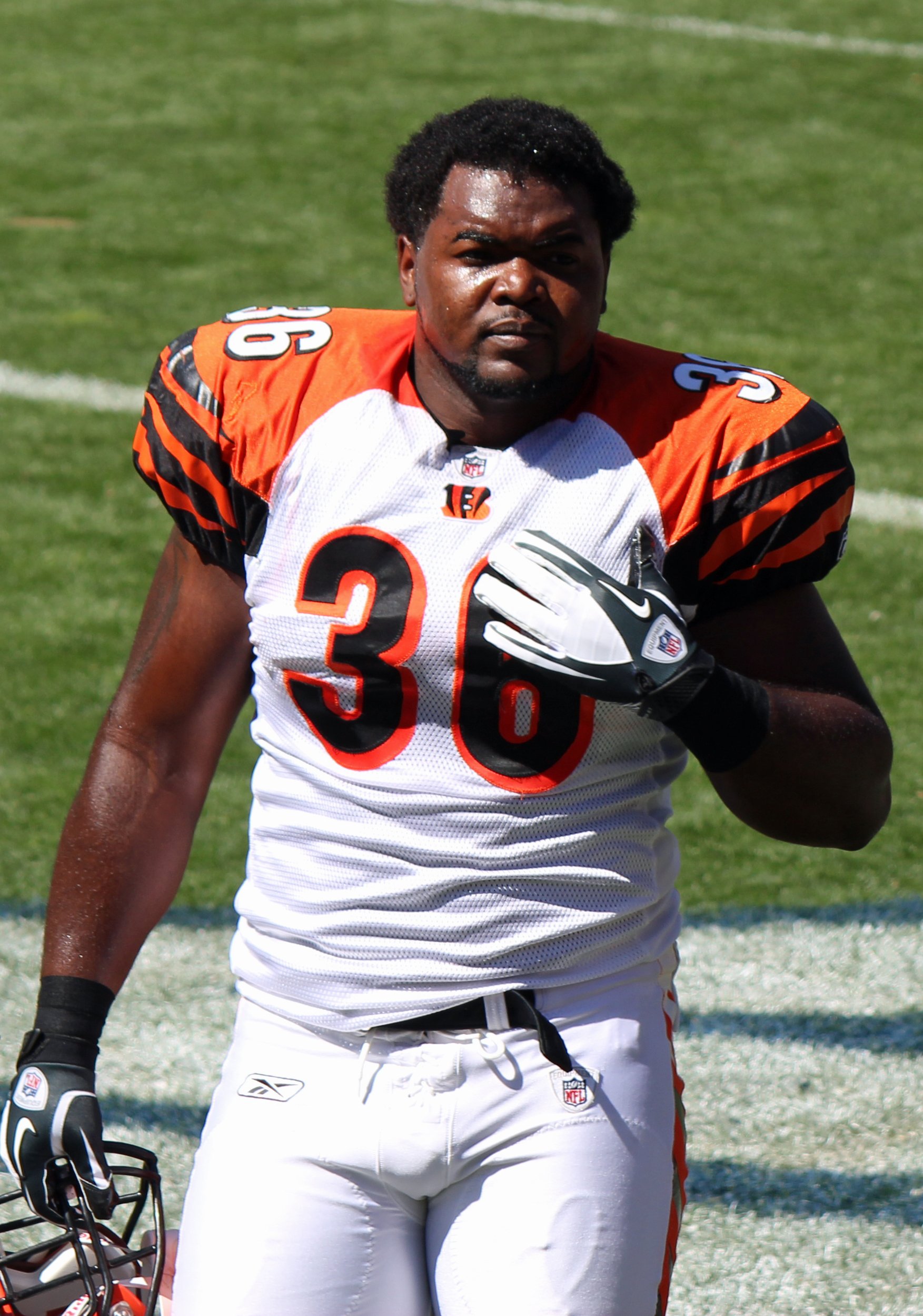
Chris Pressley was undrafted in 2009 but signed with the Cincinnati Bengals

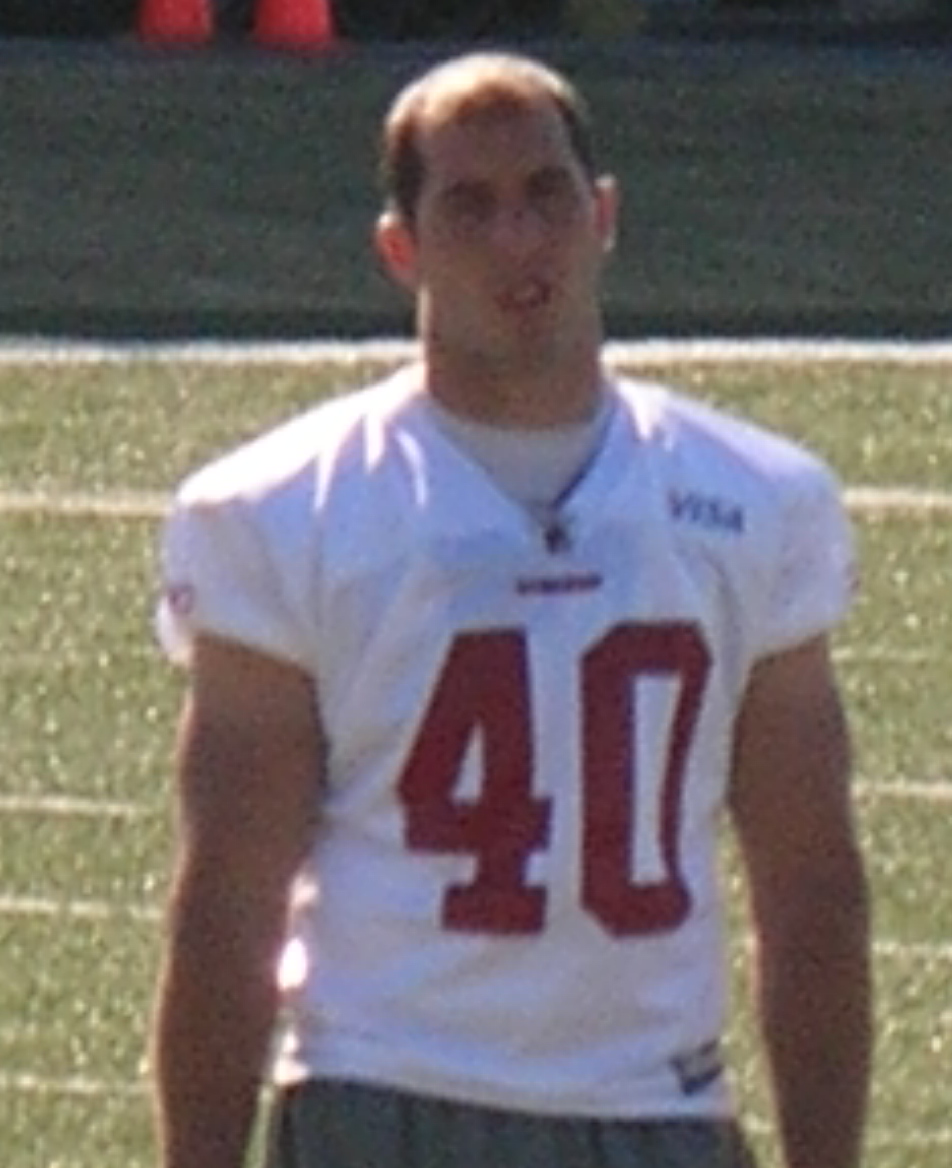
Chris Maragos was undrafted in 2010 but signed with the San Francisco 49ers

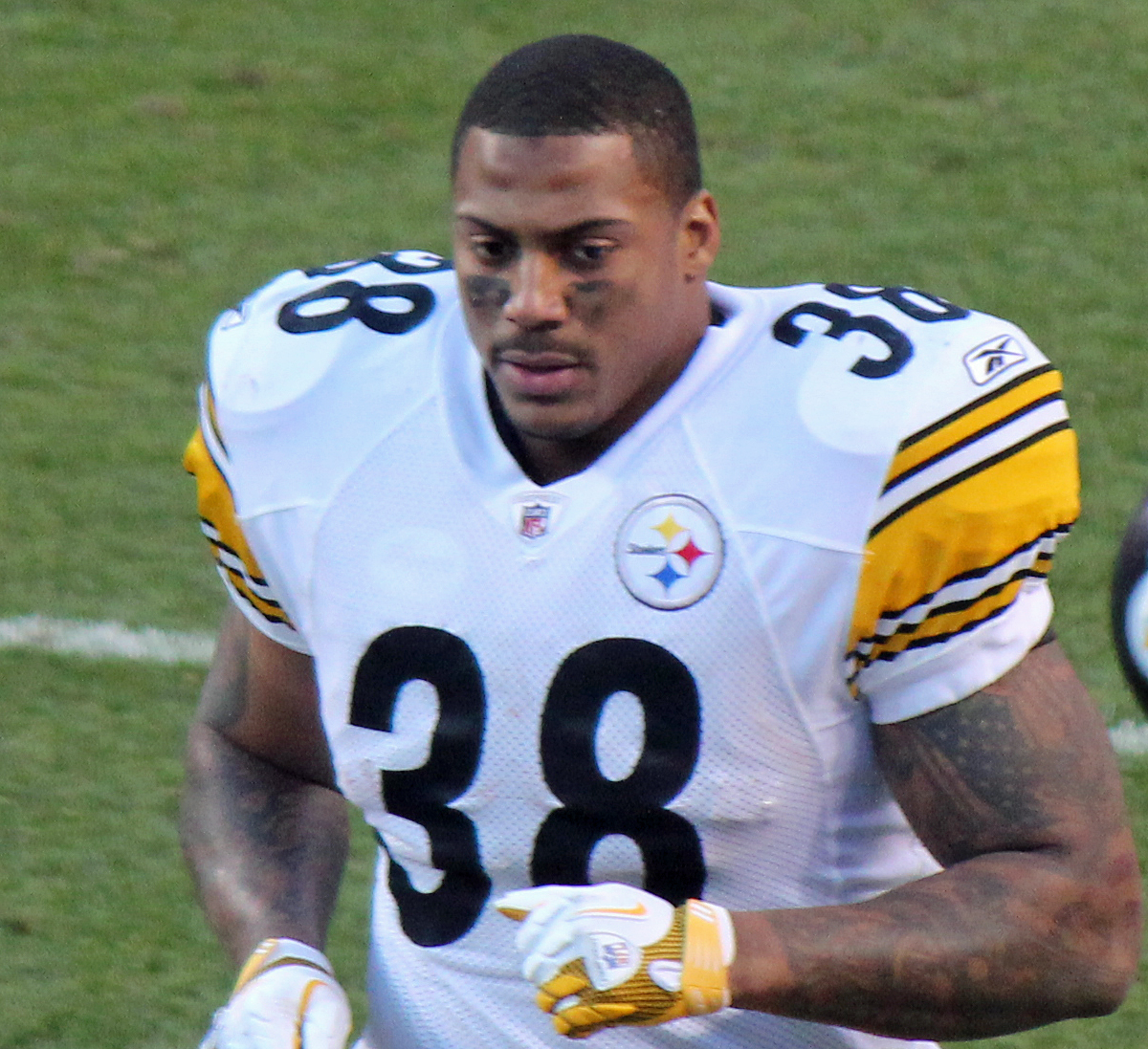
John Clay was undrafted in 2011 but signed with the Pittsburgh Steelers

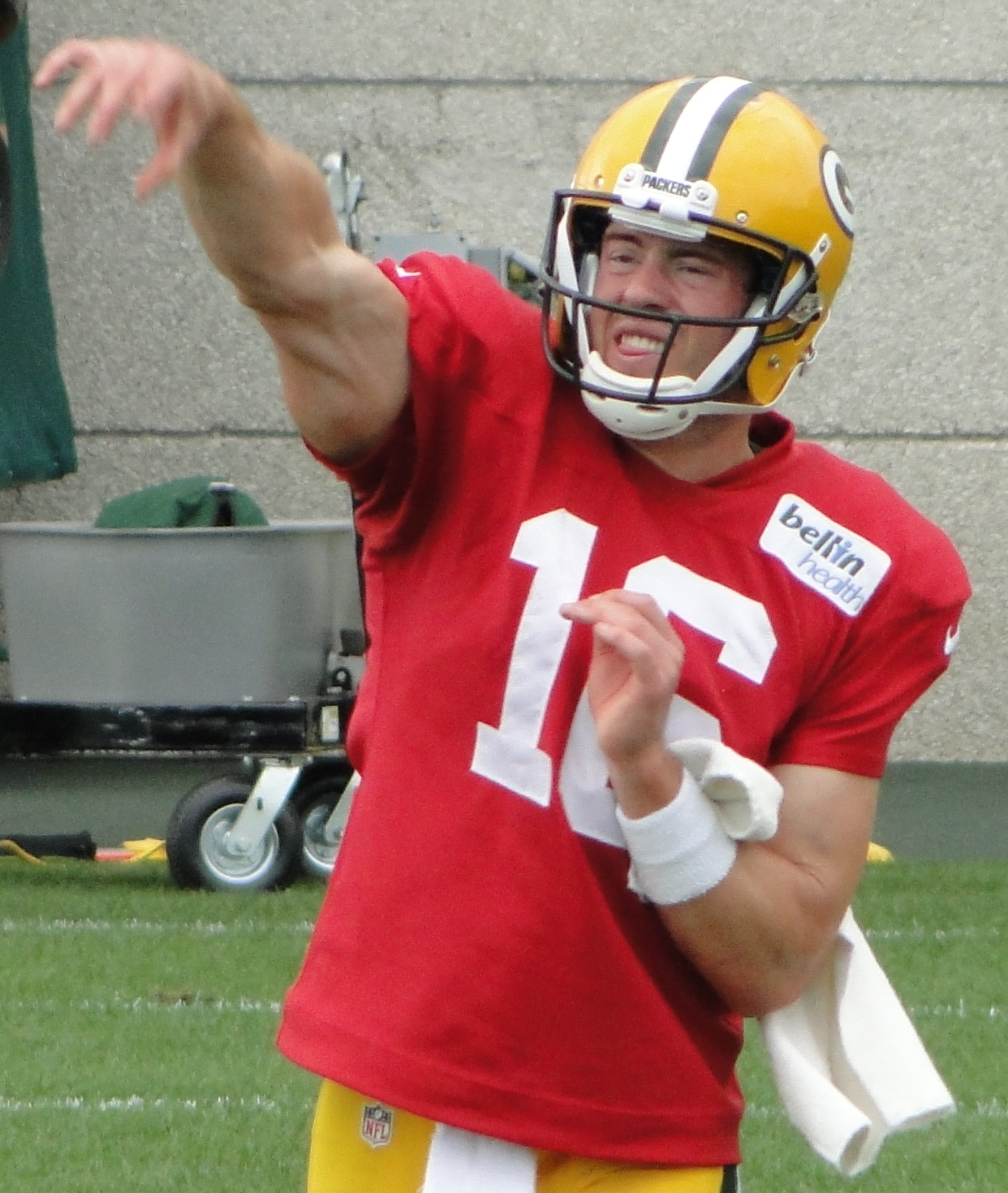
Scott Tolzien was undrafted in 2011 but signed with the San Diego Chargers

Note: No drafts held before 1936

Year	Player	Debut Team	Position	Notes
1920	Cub Buck	Canton Bulldogs	T	—
1920	Moose Gardner	Detroit Heralds	G	—
1920	Polly Koch	Rock Island Independents	G/T	—
1920	Jock Mungavin	Chicago Tigers	E	—
1921	Tubby Howard	Green Bay Packers	E/B	—
1921	Paul Meyers	New York Brickley Giants	E	—
1921	Tubby Rohsenberger	Evansville Crimson Giants	T	—
1921	Ralph Scott^{†}	Chicago Staleys	T/G	NFL Champion (1921)
1922	Bill Collins	Milwaukee Badgers	E	—
1922	Al Elliott	Racine Legion	RB	—
1922	Don Murry^{†}	Racine Legion	G/E/T	NFL Champion (1932)
1923	Shorty Barr	Racine Legion	QB	—
1923	Wes Leaper	Green Bay Packers	E	—
1923	Eber Simpson	St. Louis All-Stars	QB	—
1923	Len Smith	Racine Legion	T	—
1923	Howard Stark	Racine Legion	T	—
1923	Gus Tebell	Columbus Tigers	E	—
1923	Rollie Williams	Racine Legion	B	—
1924	Roman Brumm	Racine Legion	E/T/C/G	—
1924	Irv Carlson	Kenosha Maroons	WR/B	—
1924	Dave Noble (Note: Dave Noble transferred to Nebraska.)	Cleveland Bulldogs	B	—
1925	Jack Harris	Green Bay Packers	FB/E	—
1926	Adolph Bieberstein	Green Bay Packers	G	—
1926	George Burnside	Racine Tornadoes	QB	—
1927	Boob Darling^{†}	Green Bay Packers	C	NFL Champion (1929, 1930, 1931)
1928	Paul Schuette^{†}	New York Giants	G	NFL Champion (1932)
1929	Gene H. Rose	Chicago Cardinals	B	—
1930	Arnie Herber^{‡}	Green Bay Packers	QB	NFL All-Star (1939); NFL Champion (1930, 1931, 1936, 1939); Pro Football Hall of Fame
1931	John Cavosie	Portsmouth Spartans	FB	—
1931	Milt Gantenbein^{†}	Green Bay Packers	WR/DE	NFL Champion (1931, 1936, 1939)
1931	Milo Lubratovich	Brooklyn Dodgers	T	—
1932	Joe Kresky	Boston Braves	G/T	—
1933	Buckets Goldenberg^{†}	Green Bay Packers	G	NFL Champion (1936, 1939, 1944)
1933	Joe Kurth (Note: Joe Kurth transferred from Notre Dame.)	Green Bay Packers	T	—
1933	John Schneller^{†}	Portsmouth Spartans	E	NFL Champion (1935)
1934	Champ Seibold^{†}	Green Bay Packers	T	NFL Champion (1936)
1936	Rudy Gollomb	Philadelphia Eagles	G	—
1937	Emmett Mortell (Note: Emmett Mortell transferred to Notre Dame.)	Philadelphia Eagles	B	—
1938	Fred Borak	Green Bay Packers	DE	—
1938	Clarence Tommerson	Pittsburgh Pirates	RB	—
1939	Karl Schuelke	Pittsburgh Pirates	FB	—
1940	Bob Eckl	Milwaukee Chiefs	T	—
1942	Art Albrecht	Pittsburgh Steelers	T/C/LB	—
1944	Len Calligaro	New York Giants	QB	—
1946	George Hekkers	Miami Seahawks	T	—
1946	Bill Schroeder	Chicago Rockets	RB	—
1946	Evan Vogds	Chicago Rockets	G	—
1947	Ralph Davis	Green Bay Packers	G	—
1948	John Atwood	New York Giants	RB	—
1948	Farnham Johnson (Note: Farnham Johnson transferred to Michigan.)	Chicago Rockets	T	—
1964	Ron Parr	Buffalo Bills	LB	—
1964	Jim Purnell	Chicago Bears	LB	—
1965	Lee Bernet	Denver Broncos	TE	—
1965	Jim Nettles	Philadelphia Eagles	DB	—
1965	Ron Smith	Chicago Bears	DB	—
1967	Phil Sobocinski	Baltimore Colts	C	—
1969	Ken Criter	Denver Broncos	LB	—
1971	Jim DeLisle	Green Bay Packers	DT	—
1971	Chuck Winfrey	Minnesota Vikings	LB	—
1973	Rudy Steiner	Atlanta Falcons	QB	—
1976	Ken Starch	Green Bay Packers	RB	—
1977	Ron Egloff	Denver Broncos	TE	—
1978	Larry Canada	Denver Broncos	RB	—
1978	Mike Morgan	Chicago Bears	RB	—
1979	David Charles	Seattle Seahawks	WR	—
1979	Greg Gordon	Miami Dolphins	CB	—
1979	Jim Moore	Chicago Bears	C	—
1980	Dave Crossen	Atlanta Falcons	LB	—
1981	Bill Kazmaier	Green Bay Packers	G	—
1982	Ron Steverson	Atlanta Falcons	DB	—
1982	Steve Veith	Chicago Bears	K	—
1985	Marck Harrison	Cleveland Browns	RB	—
1985	Mike Jones	Atlanta Falcons	WR	—
1985	Sankar Montoute	Kansas City Chiefs	LB	—
1985	Art Price	Atlanta Falcons	LB	—
1985	John Williams	Dallas Cowboys	RB	—
1986	Lance Branaman	Atlanta Falcons	DT	—
1986	Bill Schick	Cleveland Browns	C	—
1987	Jim Kmet	Washington Redskins	DT	—
1987	George Winslow	Cleveland Browns	P	—
1988	Todd Gregoire	Green Bay Packers	K	—
1992	Brendan Lynch	Chicago Bears	LB	—
1992	Rafael Robinson	Seattle Seahawks	DB	—
1993	Lionell Crawford	Green Bay Packers	WR	—
1993	Rich Thompson	Green Bay Packers	K	—
1994	Reggie Holt	Green Bay Packers	S	—
1994	Lamark Shackerford	Green Bay Packers	DT	—
1995	Donny Brady	Cleveland Browns	DB	—
1995	Chad Cascadden	New York Jets	LB	—
1995	Brent Moss	Miami Dolphins	RB	—
1995	Joe Rudolph	Philadelphia Eagles	G	—
1997	Daryl Carter	Chicago Bears	LB	—
1997	Derek Engler	New York Giants	C	—
1997	John Hall	New York Jets	K	—
1998	Lamar Campbell	Detroit Lions	DB	—
1998	Jason Suttle	Denver Broncos	DB	—
1999	Matt Davenport	Pittsburgh Steelers	K	—
1999	Mike Schneck^{*}	Pittsburgh Steelers	C/LS	Pro Bowl (2005)
1999	Aaron Stecker^{†} (Note: Aaron Stecker transferred to Western Illinois.)	Chicago Bears	RB	Super Bowl Champion (XXXVII)
2000	Demetrius Brown	Pittsburgh Steelers	WR	—
2000	Ahmad Merritt	Chicago Bears	WR	—
2000	Donnel Thompson	Pittsburgh Steelers	LB	—
2001	Dave Costa	San Francisco 49ers	T	—
2001	Mike Solwold^{†}	Minnesota Vikings	C/LS	Super Bowl Champion (XXXVII)
2001	Kevin Stemke	Green Bay Packers	P	—
2001	John Sigmund	Washington Redskins	TE	—
2001	John Waerig (Note: John Waerig transferred to Maryland.)	Detroit Lions	TE	—
2002	Nick Davis	Minnesota Vikings	WR	—
2002	Chad Kuhns	New York Jets	FB	—
2003	Erik Bickerstaff	Dallas Cowboys	RB	—
2005	Morgan Davis	Pittsburgh Steelers	T	—
2005	Matt Katula	Baltimore Ravens	C/LS	—
2005	Jim Leonhard	Buffalo Bills	DB	—
2006	Donovan Raiola	St. Louis Rams	C	—
2007	Roderick Rogers	Denver Broncos	DB	—
2009	Jonathan Casillas^{†}	New Orleans Saints	LB	Super Bowl Champion (XLIV)
2009	P. J. Hill	New Orleans Saints	RB	—
2009	Mike Newkirk	St. Louis Rams	DE	—
2009	Chris Pressley	Cincinnati Bengals	FB	—
2010	Chris Maragos^{†}	San Francisco 49ers	DB	Super Bowl Champion (XLVIII, LII)
2011	John Clay	Pittsburgh Steelers	RB	—
2011	David Gilreath	Indianapolis Colts	WR	—
2011	Scott Tolzien	San Diego Chargers	QB	—
2012	Jake Byrne	New Orleans Saints	TE	—
2013	Marcus Cromartie	San Diego Chargers	DB	—
2013	Shelton Johnson	Oakland Raiders	DB	—
2014	Ryan Groy	Chicago Bears	G	—
2016	Michael Caputo	Los Angeles Rams	DB	—
2016	Alex Erickson	Cincinnati Bengals	WR	—
2016	Tyler Marz	Tennessee Titans	T	—
2016	Tanner McEvoy	Seattle Seahawks	WR	—
2016	Joel Stave	Minnesota Vikings	QB	—
2016	Austin Traylor	Dallas Cowboys	TE	—
2017	Corey Clement	Philadelphia Eagles	RB	Super Bowl Champion (LII)
2017	Dare Ogunbowale	Houston Texans	RB	—
2017	Sojourn Shelton	Arizona Cardinals	DB	—
2018	Garret Dooley	Minnesota Vikings	LB	—
2018	Alec James	Arizona Cardinals	DE	—
2018	Austin Ramesh	Arizona Cardinals	FB	—
2019	Beau Benzschawel	Detroit Lions	G	—
2019	D'Cota Dixon	Tampa Bay Buccaneers	DB	—
2019	T. J. Edwards	Philadelphia Eagles	LB	—
2019	Alec Ingold	Oakland Raiders	FB	Pro Bowl (2023)
2019	Olive Sagapolu	Green Bay Packers	DT	—
2020	Chris Orr	Carolina Panthers	LB	—
2021	Eric Burrell	New Orleans Saints	DB	—
2021	Jon Dietzen	Green Bay Packers	G	—
2021	Garrett Groshek	Las Vegas Raiders	RB	—
2021	Mason Stokke	Carolina Panthers	FB	—
2022	Danny Davis III	Green Bay Packers	WR	—
2022	Scott Nelson	Seattle Seahawks	S	—
2022	Kendric Pryor	Cincinnati Bengals	WR	—
2022	Jack Sanborn	Chicago Bears	LB	—
2022	Josh Seltzner	Indianapolis Colts	OL	—
2022	Caesar Williams	Los Angeles Rams	CB	—
2023	Tyler Beach	Houston Texans	OL	—
2024	Travian Blaylock	Chicago Bears	S	
2024	Peter Bowden	Green Bay Packers	LS	—
2024	Tanner Mordecai	San Francisco 49ers	QB	—
2024	Maema Njongmeta	Cincinnati Bengals	LB	—
2024	Hayden Rucci	Miami Dolphins	TE	—
2025	Bryson Green	Arizona Cardinals	WR	—
2025	Joe Huber	Minnesota Vikings	OT	—
2026	Jackson Acker	Buffalo Bills	FB	—
2026	Vinny Anthony II	Atlanta Falcons	WR	—
2026	Austin Brown	Indianapolis Colts	S	—
2026	Nyzier Fourqurean	Los Angeles Rams	CB	—
2026	Riley Mahlman	Atlanta Falcons	OT	—
2026	Lance Mason	Seattle Seahawks	TE	—
2026	Darryl Peterson III	Los Angeles Rams	LB	—
2026	Mason Reiger	Miami Dolphins	LB	—
2026	Jay'viar Suggs	New Orleans Saints	DT	—
