= 1992 Big Ten Conference football season =

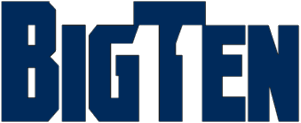
- League: NCAA Division I-A
- Sport: football
- Teams: 10
- Champions: Michigan

Football seasons

1992 Big Ten Conference football standings
	Conf.					Overall
Team	W		L		T	W		L		T
No. 5 Michigan $	6	–	0	–	2	9	–	0	–	3
No. 18 Ohio State	5	–	2	–	1	8	–	3	–	1
Michigan State	5	–	3	–	0	5	–	6	–	0
Illinois	4	–	3	–	1	6	–	5	–	1
Iowa	4	–	4	–	0	5	–	7	–	0
Indiana	3	–	5	–	0	5	–	6	–	0
Wisconsin	3	–	5	–	0	5	–	6	–	0
Purdue	3	–	5	–	0	4	–	7	–	0
Northwestern	3	–	5	–	0	3	–	8	–	0
Minnesota	2	–	6	–	0	2	–	9	–	0
$ – Conference champion; Rankings from AP Poll

The 1992 Big Ten Conference football season was the 97th season of college football played by the member schools of the Big Ten Conference and was a part of the 1992 NCAA Division I-A football season.

This would be the last season the Big Ten Conference would compete with ten football members, as Penn State was voted into the league in 1990 and would begin league play in 1993 as its eleventh school.

== Regular season ==
No. 5 Michigan won the 1992 Big Ten title with a 6-0-2 record, their fifth consecutive championship. One of their conference ties came against No. 18 Ohio State, who finished second with a 5-2-1 (8-3-1 overall) record. Michigan State would finish a half game back in third place at 5-3 (5-6 overall).

Illinois took fourth at 4-3-1 (6-5-1), also tying Michigan. Iowa came in fifth at 4-4 (5-7 overall).

There was a four-way tie for sixth place between Indiana, Wisconsin, Purdue, and Northwestern, who all took home 3-5 Big Ten records. Minnesota finished last at 2-6 (2-9 overall).

== Bowl games ==
Three Big Ten teams played in bowl games, with the conference going 1-2 overall:

Bowl Game	Winning team		Losing team		Date
Rose Bowl	No. 7 Michigan	38	No. 9 Washington	31	1/1/93
Florida Citrus Bowl	No. 8 Georgia	21	No. 15 Ohio State	14	1/1/93
Holiday Bowl	Hawaii	27	Illinois	17	12/30/92
