= Chris Hutchinson (American football) =

American football player (born 1969)

No. 97
- Positions: Defensive tackle, linebacker

Personal information
- Born: December 17, 1969 (age 56); Joliet, Illinois, U.S.
- Listed height: 6 ft 2 in (1.88 m)
- Listed weight: 249 lb (113 kg)

Career information
- High school: Cypress Creek (Houston, Texas)
- College: Michigan (1989–1992)
- NFL draft: 1993: undrafted

Career history
- Cleveland Browns (1993)*
- * Offseason or practice squad member only

Awards and highlights
- First-team All-American (1992); Big Ten Defensive Lineman of the Year (1992); First-team All-Big Ten (1992); Second-team All-Big Ten (1989)

Christopher H. Hutchinson (born December 17, 1969) is an American physician and former college football player who was a defensive tackle and linebacker for the Michigan Wolverines from 1989 to 1992. He was selected as a first-team All-American and named the Big Ten Defensive Lineman of the Year in 1992, as well as voted a team captain and MVP.

== Early life ==
Hutchinson was born in 1969 in Joliet, Illinois. He moved to Houston, Texas at age five. He attended Cypress Creek High School in Harris County, Texas.

== University of Michigan ==
Hutchinson enrolled at the University of Michigan in 1988 and played football for the Wolverines from 1989 to 1992.

After redshirting in 1988, he started all 12 games at defensive tackle for the 1989 Michigan Wolverines football team that compiled a 10–2 record in Bo Schembechler's final year as Michigan's head coach. Hutchinson was selected by the Sporting News as the nation's outstanding freshman defensive lineman.

As a sophomore, Hutchinson started seven games at defensive tackle for the 1990 Michigan team that compiled a 9–3 record in Gary Moeller's first year as head coach.

As a junior, Hutchinson started eight games at defensive tackle for the 1991 Michigan team that compiled a 10–2 record, and finished the season ranked #6 in the AP Poll. At the end of the season, Hutchinson was selected as a first-team All-Big Ten defensive tackle.

As a senior, Hutchinson was voted a team tri-captain and started six games at defensive tackle and six games at outside linebacker for the undefeated 1992 Michigan team that compiled a 9–0–3 record and defeated Washington in the 1993 Rose Bowl. During the 1992 season, Hutchinson broke Michigan's single season record for quarterback sack yardage with 99 and tied the single season sack record with eleven. He concluded his collegiate career with 24 career sacks, then the second highest total in Michigan history. He also finished second in Michigan history for career sack yardage.

At the end of the 1992 season, Hutchinson was selected as the team's Most Valuable Player, won the Dick Katcher and Meyer Morton Awards, and was named the Big Ten Conference Defensive Lineman of the Year. He was also selected by the American Football Coaches Association, Football Writers Association of America, Scripps-Howard and Football News as a first-team player on the 1990 College Football All-America Team. In addition to his athletic performance, Hutchinson also performed at a high level academically, being named to the Academic All-Big Ten team three times and becoming an NCAA Post-Graduate Scholarship winner.

== Career ==
Pre-draft measurables
Height	Weight	Arm length	Hand span	40-yard dash	10-yard split	20-yard split	20-yard shuttle	Vertical jump	Broad jump	Bench press
6 ft 2 in (1.88 m)	247 lb (112 kg)	30 7/8 in (0.78 m)	9 in (0.23 m)	4.81 s	1.70 s	2.81 s	4.24 s	31.5 in (0.80 m)	9 ft 0 in (2.74 m)	26 reps
All values from NFL Combine

After graduating from Michigan, Hutchinson signed as a free agent with the Cleveland Browns. During rookie training camp, Hutchinson developed complications from a tetanus shot, which precipitated his retirement from football.

Hutchinson then enrolled at the University of Michigan Medical School and became a physician. As of September 2018, he was living in Plymouth, Michigan, and working as an emergency room physician at Beaumont Hospital.

== Personal life ==
Hutchinson's youngest child, Aidan, is a defensive end who also attended the University of Michigan and was selected second overall by the Detroit Lions in the 2022 NFL draft.
