= 1992 Minnesota Golden Gophers football team =

American college football season

1992 Minnesota Golden Gophers football
- Conference: Big Ten Conference
- Record: 2–9 (2–6 Big Ten)
- Head coach: Jim Wacker (1st season)
- Offensive coordinator: Bob DeBesse (1st season)
- Defensive coordinator: Marc Dove (1st season)
- Captains: Keith Ballard; Andre Davis; Marquel Fleetwood; Ted Harrison
- Home stadium: Hubert H. Humphrey Metrodome

1992 Big Ten Conference football standings
	Conf.					Overall
Team	W		L		T	W		L		T
No. 5 Michigan $	6	–	0	–	2	9	–	0	–	3
No. 18 Ohio State	5	–	2	–	1	8	–	3	–	1
Michigan State	5	–	3	–	0	5	–	6	–	0
Illinois	4	–	3	–	1	6	–	5	–	1
Iowa	4	–	4	–	0	5	–	7	–	0
Indiana	3	–	5	–	0	5	–	6	–	0
Wisconsin	3	–	5	–	0	5	–	6	–	0
Purdue	3	–	5	–	0	4	–	7	–	0
Northwestern	3	–	5	–	0	3	–	8	–	0
Minnesota	2	–	6	–	0	2	–	9	–	0
$ – Conference champion; Rankings from AP Poll

The 1992 Minnesota Golden Gophers football team represented the University of Minnesota in the 1992 NCAA Division I-A football season. In their first year under head coach Jim Wacker, the Golden Gophers compiled a 2–9 record and were outscored by their opponents by a combined total of 313 to 200.

Offensive lineman Keith Ballard, defensive lineman Dennis Cappella and punter Dean Kaufman were named All-Big Ten second team. Defensive back Justin Conzemius, wide receiver Omar Douglas, defensive lineman Shawn Ehrich, offensive lineman Chris Fowlkes, linebacker Peter Hiestand, defensive back Dan LiSanti, defensive back Jeff Rosga and linebacker Lance Wolkow were named Academic All-Big Ten.

Keith Ballard was awarded the Bronko Nagurski Award. Running back Antonio Carter was awarded the Bruce Smith Award. Dennis Cappella was awarded the Carl Eller Award. Wide receiver Jon Lewis was winner of the Bobby Bell Award. Linebacker Russ Heath was awarded the Butch Nash Award. Running back Ken McClintock was awarded the Paul Giel Award.

Total attendance for the season was 227,446, which averaged out to 37,908 per game. The season high for attendance was against rival Iowa.

== Schedule ==
Date	Time	Opponent	Site	Result	Attendance	Source
September 12	7:00 pm	San Jose State*	Hubert H. Humphrey Metrodome; Minneapolis, MN	L 30–39	36,912	
September 19	6:00 pm	No. 11 Colorado*	Hubert H. Humphrey Metrodome; Minneapolis, MN	L 20–21	33,719	
September 26	11:00 am	at Pittsburgh*	Pitt Stadium; Pittsburgh, PA	L 33–41	31,129	
October 3	6:00 pm	Illinois	Hubert H. Humphrey Metrodome; Minneapolis, MN	W 18–17	32,112	
October 10	1:00 pm	at Purdue	Ross–Ade Stadium; West Lafayette, IN	L 20–24	30,635	
October 17	6:00 pm	Michigan State^{†}	Hubert H. Humphrey Metrodome; Minneapolis, MN	L 15–20	35,594	
October 24	12:00 pm	at No. 3 Michigan	Michigan Stadium; Ann Arbor, MI (Little Brown Jug)	L 13–63	106,579	
October 31	6:00 pm	Indiana	Hubert H. Humphrey Metrodome; Minneapolis, MN	L 17–24	31,741	
November 7	12:30 pm	at No. 22 Ohio State	Ohio Stadium; Columbus, OH	L 0–17	91,764	
November 14	1:00 pm	at Wisconsin	Camp Randall Stadium; Madison, WI (rivalry)	L 6–34	48,754	
November 21	6:00 pm	Iowa	Hubert H. Humphrey Metrodome; Minneapolis, MN (rivalry)	W 28–13	57,368	
*Non-conference game; ^{†}Homecoming; Rankings from AP Poll released prior to the game; All times are in Central time

== Game summaries ==
=== Michigan ===
Minnesota Golden Gophers at Michigan Wolverines

Quarter	1	2	3	4	Total
Minnesota	7	0	6	0	13
Michigan	21	14	28	0	63

at Michigan Stadium, Ann Arbor, Michigan

- Date: October 24, 1992
- Game attendance: 106,579

Game information

First quarter

- MICH – Derrick Alexander 52-yard pass from Elvis Grbac (Peter Elezovic kick). Michigan 7–0. Drive:
- MINN – John Lewis 88-yard kickoff return (Aaron Piepkorn kick). Tie 7–7.
- MICH – Derrick Alexander 13-yard pass from Elvis Grbac (Peter Elezovic kick). Michigan 14–7. Drive:
- MICH – Derrick Alexander 3-yard pass from Elvis Grbac (Peter Elezovic kick). Michigan 21–7. Drive:

Second quarter

- MICH – Tyrone Wheatley 7-yard run (Peter Elezovic kick). Michigan 28–7. Drive:
- MICH – Ed Davis 24-yard run (Peter Elezovic kick). Michigan 35–7. Drive:

Third quarter

- MINN – John Lewis 94-yard pass from Marquel Fleetwood (kick failed). Michigan 35–14. Drive:
- MICH – Derrick Alexander 32-yard pass from Elvis Grbac (Peter Elezovic kick). Michigan 42–14. Drive:
- MICH – Walter Smith 46-yard run (Peter Elezovic kick). Michigan 49–14. Drive:
- MICH – Tyrone Wheatley 2-yard run (Peter Elezovic kick). Michigan 56–14. Drive:
- MICH – Che Foster 16-yard run (Peter Elezovic kick). Michigan 63–14. Drive:

Top passers

- MINN – Marquel Fleetwood – 7/21, 150 yards, TD, INT
- MICH – Elvis Grbac – 14/19, 208 yards, 4 TD

Top rushers

- MINN – Antonio Carter – 6 rushes, 21 yards
- MICH – Tyrone Wheatley – 24 rushes, 148 yards, 2 TD

Top receivers

- MINN – John Lewis – 2 receptions, 96 yards, TD
- MICH – Derrick Alexander – 7 receptions, 130 yards, 4 TD

== Personnel ==
1992 Minnesota Golden Gophers football team roster
Players
Coaches
Offense

Pos.	#	Name	Class
RB	39	Antonio Carter	Jr
RB	44	Chris Darkins	Fr
WR	80	Omar Douglas	Jr
QB	14	Marquel Fleetwood (C)	Sr
WR	46	John Lewis	Sr

Defense

Pos.	#	Name	Class
LB	16	Craig Sauer	Fr
DT	90	Ed Hawthorne	So

Special teams

Pos.	#	Name	Class
K	6	Aaron Piepkorn	Sr

Head coach

- Jim Wacker

Coordinators/assistant coaches

Legend

- (C) Team captain
- (S) Suspended
- (I) Ineligible
- Injured
- Redshirt

Roster
