= 2012 FINA World Swimming Championships (25 m) – Men's 50 metre backstroke =

Men's 50m Backstroke at the 2012 Short Course Worlds
- Dates: 14 December (heats and semifinals); 15 December (final)
- Winning time: 23.04

Medalists
gold medal	Robert Hurley	Australia
silver medal	Matt Grevers	United States
bronze medal	Stanislav Donets	Russia

The men's 50 metre backstroke event at the 11th FINA World Swimming Championships (25m) took place 14 – 15 December 2012 at the Sinan Erdem Dome.

== Records ==
Prior to this competition, the existing world and championship records were as follows.

	Name	Nation	Time	Location	Date
World record	Peter Marshall	United States	22.61	Singapore	22 November 2009
Championship record	Stanislav Donets	Russia	22.93	Dubai	18 December 2010

No new records were set during this competition.

== Results ==
=== Heats ===
Rank	Heat	Lane	Name	Time	Notes
1	7	9	Matt Grevers (USA)	23.28	Q
2	7	4	Guilherme Guido (BRA)	23.48	Q
3	8	4	Stanislav Donets (RUS)	23.49	Q
4	8	5	Aschwin Wildeboer (ESP)	23.54	Q
5	6	5	Robert Hurley (AUS)	23.57	Q
6	6	3	Sun Xiaolei (CHN)	23.60	Q
7	6	4	Daniel Orzechowski (BRA)	23.64	Q
8	8	6	Pavel Sankovich (BLR)	23.74	Q
9	7	5	Ashley Delaney (AUS)	23.77	Q
10	5	6	Ben Hesen (USA)	23.79	Q
11	6	6	Mirco Di Tora (ITA)	23.81	Q
12	7	3	Christian Diener (GER)	23.86	Q
13	8	3	Lavrans Solli (NOR)	23.87	Q
14	7	6	Iskender Baslakov (TUR)	23.88	Q
15	5	1	Guy Barnea (ISR)	24.02	Q
16	6	1	Cheng Feiyi (CHN)	24.06	Q
17	7	7	Jonatan Kopelev (ISR)	24.17	
18	6	2	Radosław Kawęcki (POL)	24.20	
19	8	7	Alexis Santos (POR)	24.22	
20	7	2	Damiano Lestingi (ITA)	24.25	
21	1	8	Alexandr Tarabrin (KAZ)	24.36	
22	8	2	Dorian Gandin (FRA)	24.42	
23	7	8	Péter Bernek (HUN)	24.43	
24	8	1	Garth Tune (RSA)	24.50	
25	6	8	Tomasz Polewka (POL)	24.52	
26	5	7	Yuki Shirai (JPN)	24.59	
27	7	1	Darren Murray (RSA)	24.62	
28	1	1	Mindaugas Sadauskas (LTU)	24.70	
29	7	0	Andrei Shabasov (RUS)	24.76	
30	6	0	Kazuki Watanabe (JPN)	24.91	
31	4	3	Jake Tapp (CAN)	25.11	
32	8	8	Daniel Ramirez Carranza (MEX)	25.15	
33	6	7	Güven Duvan (TUR)	25.17	
34	5	4	Martin Zhelev (BUL)	25.18	NR
35	8	9	Gábor Balog (HUN)	25.26	
36	5	2	Danas Rapšys (LTU)	25.32	
37	5	8	Charles Hockin (PAR)	25.34	
38	8	0	Ng Kai Wee Rainer (SIN)	25.36	
39	5	5	Quah Zheng Wen (SIN)	25.41	
40	5	3	Armando Barrera Aira (CUB)	25.56	
41	6	9	Rostislav Kubicky (SVK)	25.67	
42	5	9	Timothy Wynter (JAM)	25.98	
43	4	4	Jean Luis Gómez (DOM)	26.04	NR
43	4	7	Awse Ma'aya (JOR)	26.04	
45	3	3	Samson Opuakpo (NGR)	26.17	
46	4	5	Boris Kirillov (AZE)	26.23	
47	4	0	Ngou Pok Man (MAC)	26.72	
48	4	6	Jamal Chavoshifar (IRI)	26.98	
48	4	1	Jordan Augier (LCA)	26.98	NR
50	5	0	Mohammed Al-Ghafri (UAE)	27.12	
51	4	8	Rahul Monal Chokshi (IND)	27.48	
52	4	2	Rohit Imoliya (IND)	27.57	
53	3	5	Mohammad Abdo (PLE)	27.91	
54	3	4	Sio Kin Hei (MAC)	28.04	
55	1	0	David van der Colff (BOT)	28.11	
56	3	2	Julien Brice (LCA)	28.15	
57	3	0	Oriol Cuñat (AND)	28.22	
58	3	9	Erdenemunkh Demuul (MGL)	28.79	
59	3	6	Pablo Feo (AND)	28.93	
60	2	5	Roman Hramtsov (TKM)	29.12	
61	3	1	Milimo Mweetwa (ZAM)	29.40	
62	2	4	Stanford Gore Kawale (PNG)	29.47	
63	2	3	Faraj Farhan (BHR)	29.53	
64	3	8	Hilal Hemed Hilal (TAN)	29.55	
65	4	9	Abdoul Khadre Mbaye Niane (SEN)	29.60	
66	2	6	Alassane Sylla (CIV)	31.28	
67	1	2	Kgosietsile Molefinyane (BOT)	31.42	
68	2	7	Franc Aleksi (ALB)	32.04	
69	2	1	Brandon Schuster (SAM)	32.34	
70	2	8	Umarkhon Alizoda (TJK)	32.39	
71	1	5	Storm Halbich (VIN)	35.02	
72	1	3	Ablam Hodadje Awoussou (BEN)	35.30	
73	1	4	Nikolas Sylvester (VIN)	36.76	
	1	6	Moris Beale (SLE)	DSQ	
	1	9	James Sahr (SLE)	DSQ	
	2	0	Giordan Harris (MHL)	DSQ	
	1	7	Luis Rojas Martinez (VEN)	DNS	
	2	2	Mohamed Eltayeb (SUD)	DNS	
	2	9	Rhudi Ayi Mensah Quaye (GHA)	DNS	
	3	7	João Aguiar (ANG)	DNS	

=== Semifinals ===
Rank	Heat	Lane	Name	Nationality	Time	Notes
1	2	5	Stanislav Donets	Russia	23.14	Q
1	2	3	Robert Hurley	Australia	23.14	Q
3	1	4	Guilherme Guido	Brazil	23.27	Q
4	1	3	Sun Xiaolei	China	23.36	Q
5	2	6	Daniel Orzechowski	Brazil	23.37	Q
6	2	4	Matt Grevers	United States	23.43	Q
7	1	1	Iskender Baslakov	Turkey	23.50	Q, NR
8	2	2	Ashley Delaney	Australia	23.60	Q
9	1	5	Aschwin Wildeboer	Spain	23.61	
10	1	2	Ben Hesen	United States	23.65	
11	1	6	Pavel Sankovich	Belarus	23.67	
11	2	8	Guy Barnea	Israel	23.67	
13	2	1	Lavrans Solli	Norway	23.68	
14	2	7	Mirco Di Tora	Italy	23.82	
15	1	7	Christian Diener	Germany	23.86	
16	1	8	Cheng Feiyi	China	23.99	

=== Final ===
The final was held at 19:07.

Rank	Lane	Name	Nationality	Time	Notes
1st place, gold medalist(s)	5	Robert Hurley	Australia	23.04	OC
2nd place, silver medalist(s)	7	Matt Grevers	United States	23.17	
3rd place, bronze medalist(s)	4	Stanislav Donets	Russia	23.19	
4	3	Guilherme Guido	Brazil	23.25	
5	8	Ashley Delaney	Australia	23.42	
6	6	Sun Xiaolei	China	23.43	
7	2	Daniel Orzechowski	Brazil	23.47	
8	1	Iskender Baslakov	Turkey	23.49	NR
