= 1992 Holiday Bowl =

1992 Thrifty Car Rental Holiday Bowl
Illinois Fighting Illini	Hawaii Rainbow Warriors
(6–4–1)	(10–2)
Big Ten	WAC
17	27
Head coach: Lou Tepper	Head coach: Bob Wagner
	AP / Coaches; NR / 24
	1	2	3	4	Total
Illinois	7	3	0	7	17
Hawaii	0	7	10	10	27
- Date: December 30, 1992
- Season: 1992
- Stadium: Jack Murphy Stadium
- Location: San Diego, California
- MVP: Offensive: Michael Carter (Hawaii); Defensive: Junior Tagoai (Hawaii)
- Referee: Pat Flood (Pac-10)
- Halftime show: Marching bands
- Attendance: 44,457
- Payout: US$1,500,000 per team

United States TV coverage
- Network: ESPN
- Announcers: Brad Nessler, Gary Danielson and Sharlene Hawkes

The 1992 Holiday Bowl was a college football bowl game played December 30, 1992, in San Diego, California. It was part of the 1992 NCAA Division I-A football season. It featured the unranked Illinois Fighting Illini, and the 25th ranked Hawaii Rainbow Warriors.

== Background ==
Hawaii was co-champion of the Western Athletic Conference (along with Fresno State and BYU), their first ever conference championship. As such, they were invited to the Holiday Bowl, their first bowl game outside of Hawaii and their second bowl in three years. Illinois was making their fifth straight bowl game.

== Game summary ==
Illinois took an early 7–0 lead on a 14-yard touchdown pass from quarterback Jason Verduzco to John Wright. Hawaii responded with a 6-yard touchdown run from running back Travis Sims, tying the game at 7. At the end of the quarter, Illinois' Chris Richardson kicked a 19-yard field goal giving the Illini a 10–7 halftime lead.

In the third quarter, Travis Sims scored on a 1-yard touchdown run putting Hawaii up 14–10. Jason Elam added a 45-yard field goal, to make the score 17–10 at the end of the third quarter. In the fourth quarter, Elam added a 37-yard field goal, and Michael Carter threw a 53-yard bomb to Darrick Branch putting Hawaii up 27–10. Verduzco and Wright connected for the second time of the game, as Illinois made the final score 27–17 Hawaii.
