= 1992 Purdue Boilermakers football team =

American college football season

1992 Purdue Boilermakers football
- Conference: Big Ten Conference
- Record: 4–7 (3–5 Big Ten)
- Head coach: Jim Colletto (2nd season)
- Offensive coordinator: Bobby Turner (2nd season)
- Defensive coordinator: Moe Ankney (2nd season)
- MVP: Eric Beatty
- Captains: Ernest Calloway; Don Delvy; Eric Hunter; Nick Mamula; Jeff Zgonina
- Home stadium: Ross–Ade Stadium

1992 Big Ten Conference football standings
	Conf.					Overall
Team	W		L		T	W		L		T
No. 5 Michigan $	6	–	0	–	2	9	–	0	–	3
No. 18 Ohio State	5	–	2	–	1	8	–	3	–	1
Michigan State	5	–	3	–	0	5	–	6	–	0
Illinois	4	–	3	–	1	6	–	5	–	1
Iowa	4	–	4	–	0	5	–	7	–	0
Indiana	3	–	5	–	0	5	–	6	–	0
Wisconsin	3	–	5	–	0	5	–	6	–	0
Purdue	3	–	5	–	0	4	–	7	–	0
Northwestern	3	–	5	–	0	3	–	8	–	0
Minnesota	2	–	6	–	0	2	–	9	–	0
$ – Conference champion; Rankings from AP Poll

The 1992 Purdue Boilermakers football team represented Purdue University as a member of the Big Ten Conference during the 1992 NCAA Division I-A football season. Led by second-year head coach Jim Colletto, the Boilermakers compiled an overall record of 4–7 with a mark of 3–5 in conference play, tying for sixth place the Big Ten. Purdue suffered its eighth consecutive losing season. The team played home games at Ross–Ade Stadium in West Lafayette, Indiana.

== Schedule ==
Date	Time	Opponent	Site	TV	Result	Attendance	Source
September 12	1:00 pm	No. 17 California*	Ross–Ade Stadium; West Lafayette, IN		W 41–14	44,727	
September 19	1:00 pm	Toledo*	Ross–Ade Stadium; West Lafayette, IN		L 29–33	37,715	
September 26	12:30 pm	at No. 6 Notre Dame*	Notre Dame Stadium; Notre Dame, IN (rivalry)	NBC	L 0–48	59,075	
October 3	1:00 pm	Northwestern^{†}	Ross–Ade Stadium; West Lafayette, IN		L 14–28	38,728	
October 10	1:00 pm	Minnesota	Ross–Ade Stadium; West Lafayette, IN		W 24–20	30,635	
October 17	1:05 pm	at Wisconsin	Camp Randall Stadium; Madison, WI		L 16–19	73,573	
October 24	1:05 pm	at Iowa	Kinnick Stadium; Iowa City, IA		W 27–16	70,397	
October 31	12:30 pm	No. 3 Michigan	Ross–Ade Stadium; West Lafayette, IN	ESPN	L 17–24	37,218	
November 7	2:00 pm	at Illinois	Memorial Stadium; Champaign, IL (rivalry)		L 17–20	55,339	
November 14	1:00 pm	at Michigan State	Spartan Stadium; East Lansing, MI		L 13–35	36,803	
November 21	1:00 pm	Indiana	Ross–Ade Stadium; West Lafayette, IN (Old Oaken Bucket)		W 13–10	56,338–58,692	
*Non-conference game; ^{†}Homecoming; Rankings from AP Poll released prior to the game; All times are in Eastern time; Source:

== Game summaries ==
=== Northwestern ===
- Arlee Connors 15 rushes, 112 yards

=== Minnesota ===
- Arlee Connors 25 rushes, 138 yards

=== Indiana ===
- Eric Hunter 16 rushes, 117 yards

== Roster ==
1992 Purdue Boilermakers football team roster
Players
Coaches
Offense

Pos.	#	Name	Class
RB		Mike Alstott
OL		David Bratton
OL	74	Elvin Caldwell	Jr
WR	13	Ernest Calloway	Sr
OL		Bill Clince
RB		Earl Coleman
RB		Arlee Conners
WR	81	Rodney Dennis	Sr
FB	38	Mike Doctor	Sr
TE		Scott Green
OL		Ryan Grigson
OL		Alfie Hill
RB	6	Jeff Hill	Jr
QB		Scott Hoffman
QB	9	Eric Hunter (C)	Sr
OL		David Janiak
RB		Houston Malden
OL		Nick Mamula
RB		Galen Morrow
QB		Matt Pike
WR		Jermaine Ross
WR		Terry Samuel
OL		Chris Sedoris
TE		Tony Simmons
RB		Luis Smikle

Defense

Pos.	#	Name	Class
DB		Tank Adams
LB		Eric Beatty
LB		Romand Batton
DB		Chad Buckland
DL		Eric Schwieterman
DB		Courtland Byrd
DL		James Cole
LB		Bart Conley
LB		Don Delvy
DB		Ikee Dozier
DL		Eric Gray
LB		Aaron Hall
DB		Pat Johnson
DL		Ben Metzger
DL		Jarrod Walker
DB		Jimmy Young
DT	40	Jeff Zgonina	Sr

Special teams

Pos.	#	Name	Class
P		Rob Deignan
K		Joe O'Leary
P		Mike Ulinski

Head coach

- Jim Colletto

Coordinators/assistant coaches

- Tim Salem
  (Quarterbacks)

Legend

- (C) Team captain
- (S) Suspended
- (I) Ineligible
- Injured
- Redshirt
