= 1992 Wisconsin Badgers football team =

American college football season

1992 Wisconsin Badgers football
- Conference: Big Ten Conference
- Record: 5–6 (3–5 Big Ten)
- Head coach: Barry Alvarez (3rd season)
- Offensive coordinator: Brad Childress (1st season)
- Offensive scheme: Pro-style
- Defensive coordinator: Dan McCarney (3rd season)
- Base defense: 3–4
- MVP: Gary Casper
- Captains: Chuck Belin; Gary Casper; Lionell Crawford
- Home stadium: Camp Randall Stadium

1992 Big Ten Conference football standings
	Conf.					Overall
Team	W		L		T	W		L		T
No. 5 Michigan $	6	–	0	–	2	9	–	0	–	3
No. 18 Ohio State	5	–	2	–	1	8	–	3	–	1
Michigan State	5	–	3	–	0	5	–	6	–	0
Illinois	4	–	3	–	1	6	–	5	–	1
Iowa	4	–	4	–	0	5	–	7	–	0
Indiana	3	–	5	–	0	5	–	6	–	0
Wisconsin	3	–	5	–	0	5	–	6	–	0
Purdue	3	–	5	–	0	4	–	7	–	0
Northwestern	3	–	5	–	0	3	–	8	–	0
Minnesota	2	–	6	–	0	2	–	9	–	0
$ – Conference champion; Rankings from AP Poll

The 1992 Wisconsin Badgers football team represented the University of Wisconsin–Madison as a member of the Big Ten Conferenceduring the 1992 NCAA Division I-A football season. Led by third-year head coach Barry Alvarez, the Badgers compiled an overall record of 5–6 with a mark of 3–5 in conference play, placing in a four-way tie for sixth in the Big Ten. Wisconsin played home games at Camp Randall Stadium in Madison, Wisconsin.

== Schedule ==
Date	Time	Opponent	Site	TV	Result	Attendance	Source
September 12	2:30 p.m.	at No. 2 Washington*	Husky Stadium; Seattle, WA		L 10–27	72,800	
September 19	1:05 p.m.	Bowling Green*	Camp Randall Stadium; Madison, WI		W 39–18	57,758	
September 26	1:05 p.m.	Northern Illinois*	Camp Randall Stadium; Madison, WI		W 18–17	50,688	
October 3	11:30 a.m.	No. 12 Ohio State	Camp Randall Stadium; Madison, WI	ESPN	W 20–16	72,203	
October 10	1:05 p.m.	at Iowa	Kinnick Stadium; Iowa City, IA (rivalry)		L 22–23	70,397	
October 17	1:05 p.m.	Purdue^{†}	Camp Randall Stadium; Madison, WI		W 19–16	73,573	
October 24	11:30 a.m.	at Indiana	Memorial Stadium; Bloomington, IN	ESPN	L 3–10	43,142	
October 31	1:05 p.m.	Illinois	Camp Randall Stadium; Madison, WI		L 12–13	65,293	
November 7	2:30 p.m.	at Michigan State	Spartan Stadium; East Lansing, MI	ABC	L 10–26	45,219	
November 14	1:05 p.m.	Minnesota	Camp Randall Stadium; Madison, WI (rivalry)		W 34–6	48,754	
November 21	1:00 p.m.	at Northwestern	Dyche Stadium; Evanston, IL		L 25–27	28,265	
*Non-conference game; ^{†}Homecoming; Rankings from AP Poll released prior to the game; All times are in Central time; Source:

== Personnel ==
=== Roster ===
1992 Wisconsin Badgers football team roster
Players
Coaches
Offense

Pos.	#	Name	Class
OT	77	Tyler Adam	Jr
QB	11	Darrell Bevell	Fr
G	75	Chuck Belin (C)	Sr
TE	84	Jim Bourne	Jr
WR	19	Aaron Brown	Sr
G	65	Mike Bryan	Sr
RB	44	Jason Burns	So
WR	13	Lionell Crawford (C)	Sr
WR	1	J. C. Dawkins	So
WR	2	Lee DeRamus	So
RB	41	Terrell Fletcher	So
FB	22	Ron Johnson	Fr
QB	16	Jay Macias	So
G	53	Pat McGettigan	Sr
RB	32	Mark Montgomery	Jr
RB	33	Brent Moss	So
FB	31	Matt Nyquist	Fr
OT	58	Joe Panos	Jr
OL	51	Brian Patterson	Jr
C	76	Jeff Rasmussen	Sr
C	52	Cory Raymer	So
TE	81	Michael Roan	So
G	63	Joe Rudolph	So
QB	6	Jay Simala	Jr
WR	23	Tony Spaeth	Sr
OT	67	Mike Verstegen	So
WR	15	Tim Ware	Sr
FB	45	Jeff Wirth	Jr
WR	87	Vince Zullo	So

Defense

Pos.	#	Name	Class
S	5	Jamel Brown	So
LB	98	Yusef Burgess	Jr
CB	30	Theo Carney	So
S	51	Chad Cascadden	So
LB	57	Gary Casper	Sr
DT	92	Carlos Fowler	Jr
CB	3	Kenny Gales	So
LB	46	Terry Glavin	Fr
LB	50	Chris Hein	So
SS	10	Reggie Holt	Jr
NT	61	Lee Krueger	Jr
CB	4	Michael London	So
CB	24	Korey Manley	Sr
LB	95	Curt Maternowski	Sr
CB	29	Jeff Messenger	So
S	37	Scott Nelson	Jr
LB	48	Aaron Norvell	Sr
LB	54	Todd Orlando	Jr
LB	93	Nick Rafko	Jr
LB	86	Dwight Reese	Sr
DB	27	Paul Schneider	Sr
CB	49	Henry Searcy	Jr
NT	62	Lamark Shackerford	Jr
DL	60	Steve Stark	Fr
DT	66	Mike Thompson	So
DT	96	Patrick Thompson	Sr
S	17	Mel Tucker	Jr
LB	55	Chad Yocum	So

Special teams

Pos.	#	Name	Class
K	18	Rich Thompson	Sr
P	26	Sam Veit	So

Head coach

- Barry Alvarez

Coordinators/assistant coaches

- Brad Childress – Offensive Coordinator/Quarterbacks
- Dan McCarney – Defensive Coordinator/Defensive Line
- Bill Callahan – Offensive Line
- Kevin Cosgrove – Inside Linebackers
- Jim Hueber – Running Backs
- Tom McMahon – Defensive Backs
- Jay Norvell – Wide Receivers/Special Teams
- John Palermo – Assistant Head Coach/Outside Linebackers
- Bernie Wyatt – Tight Ends
- Rob Ianello – Recruiting Coordinator

Legend

- (C) Team captain
- (S) Suspended
- (I) Ineligible
- Injured
- Redshirt

=== Regular starters ===
Position	Player
Quarterback	Darrell Bevell
Running back	Brent Moss
Fullback	Mark Montgomery
Wide receiver	Tim Ware
Wide receiver	Lee DeRamus
Tight end	Michael Roan
Left tackle	Mike Verstegen
Left guard	Chuck Belin
Center	Cory Raymer
Right guard	Mike Bryan
Right tackle	Joe Panos

Position	Player
Defensive tackle	Mike Thompson
Nose guard	Lamark Shackerford
Defensive tackle	Carlos Fowler
Outside linebacker	Dwight Reese
Inside linebacker	Gary Casper
Inside linebacker	Aaron Norvell
Outside linebacker	Chad Yocum
Cornerback	Jeff Messenger
Strong safety	Reggie Holt
Free safety	Scott Nelson
Cornerback	Korey Manley

== Team players in the 1993 NFL draft ==
Player	Position	Round	Overall Selection	NFL club
Chuck Belin	Guard	5	127	Los Angeles Rams
