= Amy Freeze =

American television meteorologist

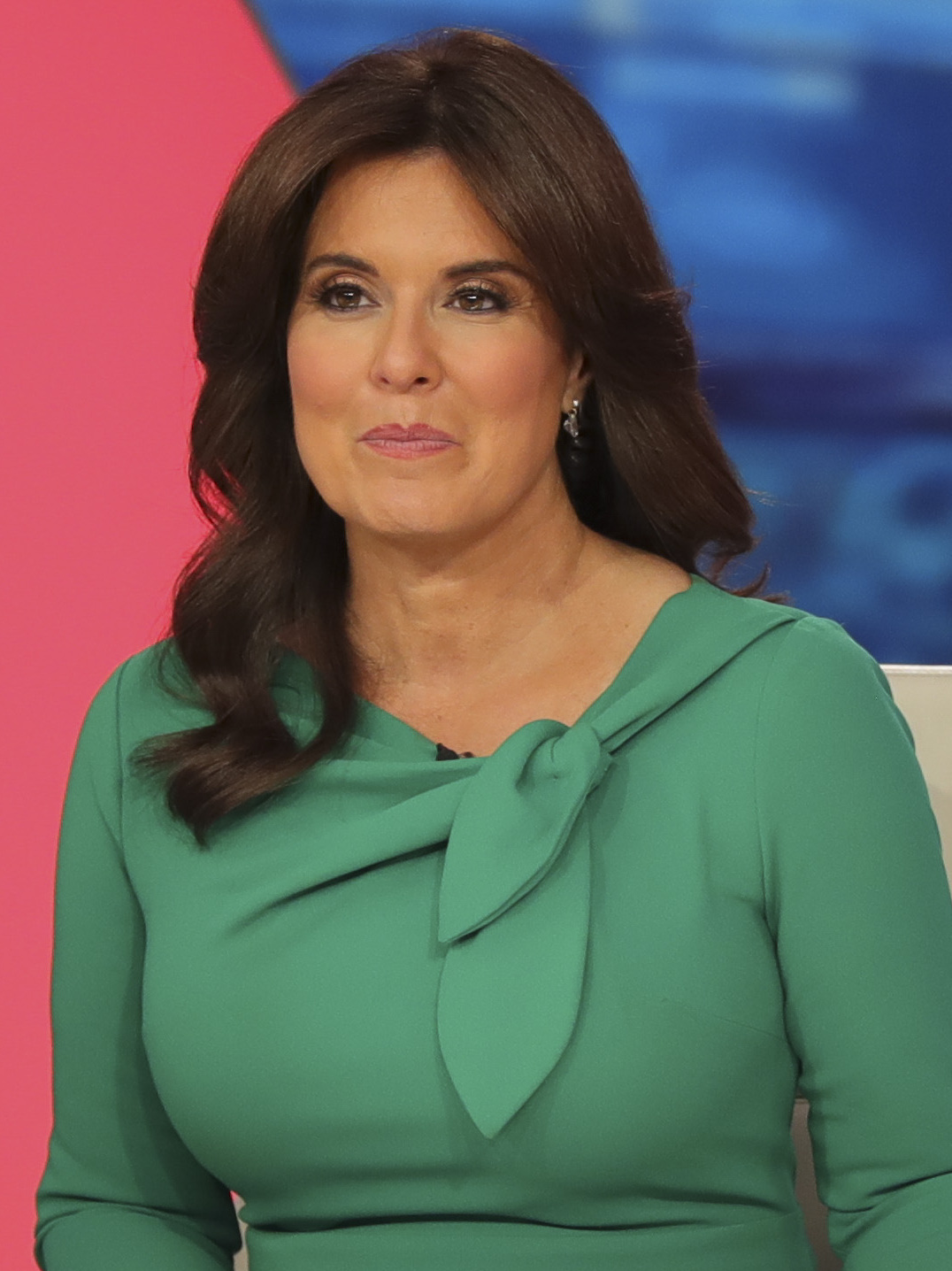
- Freeze in 2023
- Born: Amy Elizabeth Freeze; June 19, 1974 (age 52); Utah, United States
- Education: Brigham Young University; Mississippi State University; University of Pennsylvania
- Occupation: Meteorologist
- Spouse: Gary Arbuckle (divorced)
- Children: 4

Amy Elizabeth Freeze (born June 19, 1974) was an American television meteorologist. She was previously a co-anchor of Weather Command on Fox Weather. Freeze left Fox Weather in 2024.

She was the weekend meteorologist at WABC-TV in New York City, New York. She has filled in on ABC's Good Morning America.

Freeze was the first female Chief Meteorologist in Chicago, Illinois, for Fox owned-and-operated station WFLD in Chicago, serving from 2007 to 2011.

== Early life and education ==
Born in Utah and raised in Indiana, Freeze is the first of five daughters born to Bill and Linda Freeze.

She graduated from Jeffersonville High School in Jeffersonville, Indiana, in 1992. She earned a Bachelor of Arts degree in Communications from Brigham Young University, in Provo, Utah, in 1995. Freeze also received Bachelor of Science degree in Geosciences from Mississippi State University in Starkville, Mississippi, She has a master's degree from the University of Pennsylvania in Philadelphia, Pennsylvania. Her thesis was creation of "the Storm Water Action Alert Program," dealing with major cities and combined sewer overflows.

== Career ==
Before joining WFLD, Freeze worked for NBC's WCAU in Philadelphia as a meteorologist and co-Host of 10, a live entertainment show on NBC10. During that time she also worked at Rockefeller Center in New York City as a substitute for NBC's Weekend Today and MSNBC. Freeze worked in Denver, Colorado, at both KWGN and KMGH. She began her broadcasting career in Portland, Oregon, at KPTV on Good Day Oregon.

Freeze had a cameo appearance in the episode "My Life in Four Cameras" (2005) of the comedy-drama television series Scrubs (2001–2010). Her name has been featured in the American quiz show Jeopardy! in two different categories.

Freeze uses digital photos from viewers sent in via Twitter, Facebook and email that capture the weather, including them in her forecasts as "Freeze Frame," "Super Cat Saturday" and "Big Dog Sunday." She created "The Freeze Factor" – a special segment where she rates the next day's weather on a scale of one to 10. Freeze was named Top Forecaster in New York 2017 by NJ.com.

During her time in Chicago, Freeze visited more than 10,000 area students each year, giving weather presentations on tornadoes and other severe weather. She hosted the first ever Weather Education Days for MLB's Chicago White Sox, the Chicago Cubs, and for the Chicago Wolves hockey team. Freeze was the first-ever female sideline reporter for Major League Soccer working for the Colorado Rapids, LA Galaxy, and the Chicago Fire. She also worked on the sidelines for the NFL Chicago Bears for four seasons.

Freeze has certificate number 111 from the American Meteorological Society as a Certified Broadcast Meteorologist – she was one of the first 20 women in the world to receive this certification. In addition, Freeze has her National Weather Association and American Meteorological Society Seals of Approval. She is a five-time National Academy of Television Arts and Sciences Emmy Award winner. Freeze is a runner who has completed nine marathons; she has climbed to the summit of Mount Snowdon in Wales, all seven peaks of Mount Fuji, and the summit of Mount Timpanogos. Freeze surfs and she is also a certified scuba diver.

On October 6, 2021, Fox News Media announced that Freeze would be joining Fox Weather as their anchor.

In January 2023, it was announced that Fox Weather was debuting a new day time and evening lineup. Freeze was named anchor of Weather Command from 9am—12pm.

== Personal life ==
Freeze has four children and resides in Manhattan. Freeze has been divorced from Gary Arbuckle since 2016.
