= Jeffersonville High School =

Coordinates: 38°19′3″N 85°42′40″W

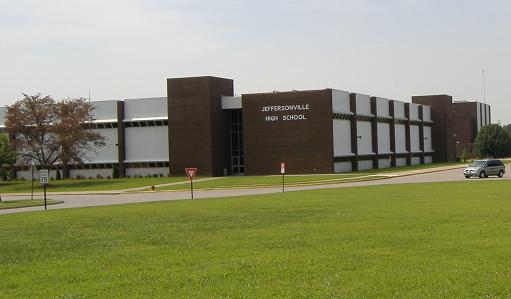
- 2315 Allison Lane; Jeffersonville, Indiana 47130; United States

Information
- Type: Public
- Established: 1870
- School district: Greater Clark County Schools
- Principal: Pamela Hall
- Staff: 114.50 (FTE)
- Grades: 9-12
- Enrollment: 2,141 (2023–2024)
- Student to teacher ratio: 18.70
- Colors: Red and white
- Song: "On, Red Devils" ("On, Wisconsin")
- Athletics: Boys: baseball, basketball, cross country, football, golf, soccer, swimming, tennis, track, & wrestling. Girls: basketball, cross country, golf, gymnastics, softball, swimming, tennis, track, volleyball, & soccer. Non-gender related: Marching Band, Color Guard, Step team, etc.
- Athletics conference: Hoosier Hills
- Mascot: Red Devil
- Newspaper: The Hyphen
- Website: jhs.gccschools.com

Jeffersonville High School is a public high school located in Jeffersonville, Indiana, United States. A part of Greater Clark County Schools, Jeffersonville High serves students in grades 9 through 12 from Jeffersonville, Utica, and sections of Clarksville in the Greater Clark County school district. The school's enrollment for the 2014–2015 school year was 2,051 students, with 123 teachers. The current principal is Pam Hall. Jeffersonville is in the school district of Greater Clark County Schools. This school district includes Charlestown addresses that are connected with the city of Jeffersonville. While most schools in other counties have a majority European ratio of students, Jeffersonville total minority enrollment is 36%.

== 2013–2014 academic statistics ==
- Graduation rate: 93.6%
- ISTEP+ passing rate: 47.4%
- ECA (End-of-Course Assessments) passing rate: 63.9%
- Percentage of graduates taking the SAT: 31.5%
- Average SAT composite score: 960
- Percentage of graduates taking the ACT: 19.7%
- Average ACT composite score: 21
- Percentage of graduates taking an Advanced Placement exam: 48.9%
- Percentage of graduates passing an AP exam: 18.9%

There is no information yet regarding the 2014–2015 school year.

Jeffersonville High School was placed on academic probation in accordance with Public Law 221 for the 2007–2008 and 2009–2010 school years, and has not made adequate yearly progress since at least prior to the 2006–2007 school year. There was no PL221 or AYP calculation for the 2008–2009 school year because of a change in spring testing.

== Extracurricular accomplishments ==
=== Athletics ===
Jeffersonville High School competes in the Indiana High School Athletic Association (IHSAA).

==== State championships ====
- 1993 boys basketball
- 1975 girls track and field
- 1977 girls track and field
- 2011 Class 4A girls basketball
- 2025 Class 4A boys basketball

=== AFJROTC ===
As of 2026, the current Senior Aerospace Science Instructor is Retired Colonel Robert Benning. As of 2026, the current Aerospace Science Instructor is retired Master Sergeant Christopher Manley.

- JHS' Air Force JROTC unit advanced to Round II of the AFJROTC Academic Bowl in 2012. The unit has also won awards for its color guard and drill team.
- The Jeffersonville High School Air Force JROTC Academic Bowl Team qualified for the National Championship in Washington, DC during the 2019–2020 season. However, due to COVID-19, this event was cancelled.
  - During the 2020–2021 season, the JHS Air Force JROTC Academic Bowl Team qualified once again for the National Championship, this time able to participate in-person at the Catholic University of America in Washington, DC. The team won 3rd place out of 470 Air Force JROTC teams from various high schools across the United States.

=== Band ===
- The Jeffersonville Winter Percussion Ensemble received the silver medal at the 2008 TriState Circuit Championships, Percussion Scholastic A section, with a score of 85.10—the highest score ever set by a Jeffersonville Indoor Drumline.
- The Jeffersonville High School Wind Symphony was a finalist at the Indiana State School Music Association state-level event in 2007.
- Jeffersonville High School was selected as Grammy Signature School in 2012.
- The Jeffersonville High School Marching Band actively competes in Bands of America competitions.
- The Jeffersonville High School Marching Band won the title of Grand Champion at Louisville Male Invitational in 2011
- The Jeffersonville High School Winterguard received the gold medal at the 2012 Tristate Circuit Championships, in Class B.
- The Jeffersonville High School Winterguard received the Gold Medal (Grand Champions) at the 2013 Tristate Circuit Championships, in Class A3.
- The Jeffersonville High School Winterguard received the silver medal at the 2014 Tristate Circuit Championships, in Class A2.
- The Wind Symphony and Symphonic Band performed in Carnegie Hall on April 13, 2015.

== Notable alumni ==
- Amy Freeze - meteorologist
- Ben Hesen - champion collegiate swimmer and US Open record holder in the 50M backstroke
- Jonas Ingram - Medal of Honor recipient and Commander-in-Chief, United States Atlantic Fleet during World War II
- Sarah Logan - professional wrestler for WWE, real name Sarah Bridges
- Zach Payne - member of the Indiana House of Representatives.
- Jermaine Ross - former NFL player for the St. Louis Rams and Jacksonville Jaguars
- John Schnatter - founder and former CEO of Papa John's Pizza
- Walt Terrell - former MLB pitcher for the New York Mets, San Diego Padres, New York Yankees, Pittsburgh Pirates, and Detroit Tigers
- Kevin Boehnlein - Former member of the Indiana Senate.
- Wendy Dant Chesser - Current member of the Indiana House of Representatives.

== See also ==
- List of high schools in Indiana
- Hoosier Hills Conference
- Jeffersonville, Indiana
