= 1992 Indiana Hoosiers football team =

American college football season

1992 Indiana Hoosiers football
- Conference: Big Ten Conference
- Record: 5–6 (3–5 Big Ten)
- Head coach: Bill Mallory (9th season)
- Defensive coordinator: Joe Novak (9th season)
- MVP: Trent Green
- Captains: Trent Green; Larry McDaniel; John Miller
- Home stadium: Memorial Stadium

1992 Big Ten Conference football standings
	Conf.					Overall
Team	W		L		T	W		L		T
No. 5 Michigan $	6	–	0	–	2	9	–	0	–	3
No. 18 Ohio State	5	–	2	–	1	8	–	3	–	1
Michigan State	5	–	3	–	0	5	–	6	–	0
Illinois	4	–	3	–	1	6	–	5	–	1
Iowa	4	–	4	–	0	5	–	7	–	0
Indiana	3	–	5	–	0	5	–	6	–	0
Wisconsin	3	–	5	–	0	5	–	6	–	0
Purdue	3	–	5	–	0	4	–	7	–	0
Northwestern	3	–	5	–	0	3	–	8	–	0
Minnesota	2	–	6	–	0	2	–	9	–	0
$ – Conference champion; Rankings from AP Poll

The 1992 Indiana Hoosiers football team represented Indiana University Bloomington as a member of the Big Ten Conference during the 1992 NCAA Division I-A football season. Led by ninth-year head coach Bill Mallory, the Hoosiers compiled an overall record of 5–6 with a mark of 3–5 in conference play, placing in a four-way tied for sixth in the Big Ten. The team played home games at Memorial Stadium in Bloomington, Indiana.

== Schedule ==
Date	Time	Opponent	Site	TV	Result	Attendance	Source
September 12		Miami (OH)*	Memorial Stadium; Bloomington, IN		W 16–0	38,815	
September 19		at Kentucky*	Commonwealth Stadium; Lexington, KY (rivalry)		L 25–37	58,450	
September 26	11:30 am	Missouri*	Memorial Stadium; Bloomington, IN	ESPN	W 20–10	40,907	
October 3		at Michigan State	Spartan Stadium; East Lansing, MI (rivalry)		L 31–42	65,516	
October 10		at Northwestern	Dyche Stadium; Evanston, IL		W 28–3	34,689	
October 17	3:30 pm	No. 3 Michigan	Memorial Stadium; Bloomington, IN	ABC	L 3–31	51,735	
October 24	11:30 am	Wisconsin^{†}	Memorial Stadium; Bloomington, IN	ESPN	W 10–3	43,142	
October 31	6:00 pm	at Minnesota	Hubert H. Humphrey Metrodome; Minneapolis, MN		W 24–17	31,741	
November 7	12:00 pm	Iowa	Memorial Stadium; Bloomington, IN		L 0–14	44,311	
November 14	3:30 pm	No. 19 Ohio State	Memorial Stadium; Bloomington, IN	ABC	L 10–27	45,534	
November 21	1:00 pm	at Purdue	Ross–Ade Stadium; West Lafayette, IN (Old Oaken Bucket)		L 10–13	56,338–58,692	
*Non-conference game; ^{†}Homecoming; Rankings from AP Poll released prior to the game; Source:

== Roster ==
1992 Indiana Hoosiers football team roster
Players
Coaches
Offense

Pos.	#	Name	Class
C	55	Rod Carey	Jr
RB	2	Jermaine Chaney	So
QB	12	Trent Green	Sr
G	72	Andrew Greene	So
RB	22	Brent Law	So
WR	8	Thomas Lewis	So
OT	61	Tom McKinnon	So
QB	11	John Paci	So
TE	89	Dan Thompson	Jr
G	56	Todd Smith	Jr

Defense

Pos.	#	Name	Class
DE	95	Charles Beauchamp	Jr
SS	25	Lance Brown	So
DT	66	Troy Drake	So
FS	16	Chris Dyer	Jr
DT	93	Hurvin McCormack	So
DE	92	Lamar Mills	Jr
FS	5	Damon Watts	Jr
DE	86	Bernard Whittington	Jr
LB	96	Trevor Wilmot	So

Special teams

Pos.	#	Name	Class

Head coach

- Bill Mallory

Coordinators/assistant coaches

Legend

- (C) Team captain
- (S) Suspended
- (I) Ineligible
- Injured
- Redshirt

== 1993 NFL draftees ==
Player	Round	Pick	Position	NFL club
Mike Middleton	3	84	Safety	Dallas Cowboys
Trent Green	8	222	Quarterback	San Diego Chargers
