= 1992 Michigan Wolverines football team =

American college football season

1992 Michigan Wolverines football

Big Ten champion Rose Bowl champion

Rose Bowl, W 38–31 vs. Washington
- Conference: Big Ten Conference

Ranking
- Coaches: No. 5
- AP: No. 5
- Record: 9–0–3 (6–0–2 Big Ten)
- Head coach: Gary Moeller (3rd season)
- Defensive coordinator: Lloyd Carr (6th season)
- MVP: Chris Hutchinson
- Captains: Corwin Brown; Elvis Grbac; Chris Hutchinson
- Home stadium: Michigan Stadium

1992 Big Ten Conference football standings
| | Conf. | | | | | Overall |
| Team | W | | L | | T | W | | L | | T |
|---|---|---|---|---|---|---|---|---|---|---|
| No. 5 Michigan $ | 6 | – | 0 | – | 2 | 9 | – | 0 | – | 3 |
| No. 18 Ohio State | 5 | – | 2 | – | 1 | 8 | – | 3 | – | 1 |
| Michigan State | 5 | – | 3 | – | 0 | 5 | – | 6 | – | 0 |
| Illinois | 4 | – | 3 | – | 1 | 6 | – | 5 | – | 1 |
| Iowa | 4 | – | 4 | – | 0 | 5 | – | 7 | – | 0 |
| Indiana | 3 | – | 5 | – | 0 | 5 | – | 6 | – | 0 |
| Wisconsin | 3 | – | 5 | – | 0 | 5 | – | 6 | – | 0 |
| Purdue | 3 | – | 5 | – | 0 | 4 | – | 7 | – | 0 |
| Northwestern | 3 | – | 5 | – | 0 | 3 | – | 8 | – | 0 |
| Minnesota | 2 | – | 6 | – | 0 | 2 | – | 9 | – | 0 |
$ – Conference champion; Rankings from AP Poll

The 1992 Michigan Wolverines football team was an American football team that represented the University of Michigan in the Big Ten Conference during the 1992 NCAA Division I-A football season. In their third season under head coach Gary Moeller, the Wolverines compiled a 9–0–3 record (6–0–2 in conference games), outscored opponents by a total of 393 to 140, and won their fifth consecutive Big Ten championship. They played three tie games, in the opening game with No. 3 Notre Dame and in the final two games of the regular season with unranked Illinois and No. 17 Ohio State. They concluded the season with a victory over Washington in the 1993 Rose Bowl and were ranked No. 5 in the final AP Poll.

The team's major individual accomplishments included the following:

- Defensive tackle/linebacker Chris Hutchinson won the team's most valuable player award and was selected as a first-team All-American by the American Football Coaches Association, Football Writers Association of America, Football News, and Scripps Howard News Service.
- Quarterback Elvis Grbac led the NCAA Division I FBS in passing efficiency and won the Sammy Baugh Trophy as the nation's best collegiate passer.
- Running back Tyrone Wheatley led the Big Ten with 1,122 rushing yards and was selected as the Big Ten's Offensive Player of the Year.
- Wide receiver Derrick Alexander led the team with 47 receptions for 722 yards. Wheatley and Alexander led the team in scoring with 84 points each.
- Moeller was named Big Ten Coach of the Year.

Thirteen Michigan players received first-team honors on the 1992 All-Big Ten Conference football team: Hutchinson (AP-1; Coaches-1); Wheatley (AP-1; Coaches-1); Grbac (AP-1; Coaches-1); Alexander (AP-1; Coaches-1); center Steve Everitt (AP-1); offensive guards Joe Cocozzo (AP-1; Coaches-1) and Doug Skene (Coaches-1); offensive tackle Rob Doherty (AP-1); tight end Tony McGee (Coaches-1); defensive lineman Matt Dyson (Coaches-1); linebacker Steve Morrison (AP-1); and defensive backs Corwin Brown (AP-1; Coaches-1) and Shonte Peoples (Coaches-1).

== Schedule ==
| Date | Time | Opponent | Rank | Site | TV | Result | Attendance | Source |
|---|---|---|---|---|---|---|---|---|
| September 12 | 2:30 p.m. | at No. 3 Notre Dame* | No. 6 | Notre Dame Stadium; Notre Dame, IN (rivalry) | NBC | T 17–17 | 59,075 | |
| September 19 | 12:30 p.m. | Oklahoma State* | No. 6 | Michigan Stadium; Ann Arbor, MI | ESPN | W 35–3 | 104,253 | |
| September 26 | 3:30 p.m. | Houston* | No. 4 | Michigan Stadium; Ann Arbor, MI | ABC | W 61–7 | 104,968 | |
| October 3 | 3:30 p.m. | Iowa | No. 4 | Michigan Stadium; Ann Arbor, MI | ABC | W 52–28 | 106,132 | |
| October 10 | 1:00 p.m. | Michigan State | No. 3 | Michigan Stadium; Ann Arbor, MI (rivalry) | ABC | W 35–10 | 106,788 | |
| October 17 | 3:30 p.m. | at Indiana | No. 3 | Memorial Stadium; Bloomington, IN | ABC | W 31–3 | 51,735 | |
| October 24 | 1:00 p.m. | Minnesota^{†} | No. 3 | Michigan Stadium; Ann Arbor, MI (Little Brown Jug) | MSC | W 63–13 | 106,579 | |
| October 31 | 12:30 p.m. | at Purdue | No. 3 | Ross–Ade Stadium; West Lafayette, IN | ESPN | W 24–17 | 37,218 | |
| November 7 | 12:30 p.m. | at Northwestern | No. 4 | Dyche Stadium; Evanston, IL (rivalry) | ESPN | W 40–7 | 37,903 | |
| November 14 | 12:00 p.m. | Illinois | No. 3 | Michigan Stadium; Ann Arbor, MI (rivalry) | ABC | T 22–22 | 106,481 | |
| November 21 | 12:00 p.m. | at No. 17 Ohio State | No. 6 | Ohio Stadium; Columbus, OH (The Game) | ABC | T 13–13 | 95,330 | |
| January 1, 1993 | 4:30 p.m. | vs. No. 9 Washington* | No. 7 | Rose Bowl; Pasadena, CA (Rose Bowl) | ABC | W 38–31 | 94,236 | |
*Non-conference game; ^{†}Homecoming; Rankings from AP Poll released prior to the game; All times are in Eastern time

== Game summaries ==
=== Notre Dame ===
Michigan was ranked #6 and traveled to South Bend to play the #3 ranked Fighting Irish. After falling behind 7-0, Michigan scored 17 straight points on a Tyrone Wheatley 27 yard run, Pete Elezovic’s 28 yard field goal and Derrick Alexander’s 30 yard TD pass reception from Elvis Grbac. Notre Dame rallied in the 4th quarter on a Jerome Bettis 2 yard run and Craig Hentrich’s 32 yard field goal to tie the game 17-17. Grbac finished the game completing 17 of 28 passes for 242 yards, but threw 3 interceptions.

=== Oklahoma State ===
Todd Collins led the way for #6 ranked Michigan as he threw for 285 yards on 29 completions in 42 attempts and two touchdown passes to Derrick Alexander as the Wolverines cruised to a 35-3 victory over Oklahoma State. Ricky Powers ran for two touchdowns and Ed Davis ran for one as the Michigan offense rolled up 501 yards of total offense. The Wolverine defense held the Cowboys 187 yards of total offense, while Dwayne Ware, Corwin Brown and Steve Morrison each had interceptions.

=== Houston ===
Tyrone Wheatley returned the opening kickoff 99 yards for a touchdown and the #4 ranked Wolverines never looked back as they routed the Cougars, 61-7. Todd Collins completed 17 of 24 passes for 205 yards and threw 4 touchdown passes, including two to Tony McGee. Ed Davis ran for 108 yards and a touchdown. Wheatley and Derrick Alexander each ran for one touchdown and Mercury Hayes, Jesse Johnson and Amani Toomer each caught a TD pass. The Wolverines rang up 537 yards of total offense. The defense held Houston to 276 yards of total offense and Steve Morrison and Shonte Peoples had interceptions. Houston scored with 3:42 left in the game to avoid the shutout.

Houston Cougars at Michigan Wolverines

| Quarter | 1 | 2 | 3 | 4 | Total |
|---|---|---|---|---|---|
| Houston | 0 | 0 | 0 | 7 | 7 |
| Michigan | 7 | 35 | 6 | 13 | 61 |

at Michigan Stadium • Ann Arbor, Michigan

- Date: September 26
- Game attendance: 104,968
- Reference: Gainesville Sun. 1992 Sep 27.

Game information

Houston

- Klingler
  15/28, 179 Yds, TD, INT
- Smith
  7 Rush, 52 Yds
  9 Rec, 65 Yds

Michigan

- Collins
  17/24, 205 Yds, 4 TD, INT
- Davis
  11 Rush, 105 Yds, TD
- Alexander
  4 Rec, 61 Yds

Scoring summary

| Quarter | Time | Drive | | | Team | Scoring information | Score | |
| Quarter | Time | Plays | Yards | TOP | Team | Scoring information | HOU | MICH |
|---|---|---|---|---|---|---|---|---|
| 1 | | | | | Michigan | Kickoff returned 99 yards for touchdown by Wheatley, Elezovic kick good | 0 | 7 |
| 2 | | | | | Michigan | McGee 18-yard touchdown reception from Collins, Elezovic kick good | 0 | 14 |
| 2 | | | | | Michigan | Hayes 43-yard touchdown reception from Collins, Elezovic kick good | 0 | 21 |
| 2 | | | | | Michigan | McGee 23-yard touchdown reception from Collins, Elezovic kick good | 0 | 28 |
| 2 | | | | | Michigan | Alexander 23-yard touchdown run, Elezovic kick good | 0 | 35 |
| 2 | | | | | Michigan | Wheatley 7-yard touchdown run, Elezovic kick good | 0 | 42 |
| 3 | | | | | Michigan | Johnson 12-yard touchdown reception from Grbac, kick no good | 0 | 48 |
| 4 | | | | | Michigan | Toomer 14-yard touchdown reception from Riemersma, kick no good | 0 | 54 |
| 4 | | | | | Michigan | Davis 11-yard touchdown run, Lovell kick good | 0 | 61 |
| 4 | | | | | Houston | Peters 25-yard touchdown reception from Klingler, Craft kick good | 7 | 61 |
| "TOP" = time of possession. For other American football terms, see Glossary of American football. | | | | | | | 7 | 61 |

=== Iowa ===
- Tyrone Wheatley 19 Rush, 224 Yds

Iowa couldn't stop Michigan's powerful offense, led by Tyrone Wheatley, who rushed for a career-high 224 yards and three touchdowns on 19 carries. The Wolverines scored a touchdown on their first 3 possessions, and were up 31-0 in the 2nd quarter. The Hawkeyes fought back, but it was too little too late. QB Jim Hartlieb was harassed by the Wolverines all day, and finished with 25 completions in 39 attempts for 308 yards and three touchdowns, but had 3 interceptions. Ricky Powers, Che Foster and Burnie Legette all ran for touchdowns and Tony McGee caught a touchdown pass from Elvis Grbac. Alfie Burch, Matt Dyson, Shonte Peoples and Deon Johnson each had interceptions for the Wolverines.

=== Michigan State ===
The #3 ranked Wolverines raced to a 28-0 lead in the first half and cruised to a 35-10 victory over the Spartans. Tyrone Wheatley rushed for 172 yards and two touchdowns to lead the Michigan offense. Derrick Alexander returned a punt 80 yards for a touchdown in the 2nd quarter. Jesse Johnson and Burnie Legette added touchdown runs while the Wolverine defense held MSU to 60 yards rushing. Marcus Walker led the defense with 12 tackles and an interception.

=== Indiana ===
After falling behind 3-0 midway through the 1st quarter, the #3 ranked Wolverines ripped off 31 straight 1st half points to beat Indiana, 31-3. Both teams went scoreless in the 2nd half. Tyrone Wheatley caught a 26 yard TD pass from Elvis Grbac and ran 54 yards for a touchdown. Derrick Alexander caught an 8 yard TD pass from Grbac, then finished up the scoring with a 70 yard punt return for a touchdown. Wheatley finished the game with 134 yards rushing. The Michigan defense held the Hoosiers offense to 149 yards.

=== Minnesota ===
Derrick Alexander caught 4 touchdown passes from Elvis Grbac as the Wolverines pummeled the Golden Gophers 63-13 at the Big House. Alexander finished with 130 yards on 7 catches while Grbac finished with 208 yards, completing 14 of 19 passes. Tyrone Wheatley ran for 148 yards and ran for two touchdowns. The Wolverine offense rolled up 627 yards of total offense while the defense held Minnesota to 227 yards of total offense. Ed Davis, Walter Smith and Che Foster each ran for touchdowns for Michigan. Ninef Aghakhan had an interception for the Wolverines.

Minnesota Golden Gophers at Michigan Wolverines

| Quarter | 1 | 2 | 3 | 4 | Total |
|---|---|---|---|---|---|
| Minnesota | 7 | 0 | 6 | 0 | 13 |
| Michigan | 21 | 14 | 28 | 0 | 63 |

at Michigan Stadium, Ann Arbor, Michigan

- Date: October 24, 1992
- Game attendance: 106,579

Game information

First quarter

- MICH – Derrick Alexander 52-yard pass from Elvis Grbac (Peter Elezovic kick). Michigan 7–0. Drive:
- MINN – John Lewis 88-yard kickoff return (Aaron Piepkorn kick). Tie 7–7.
- MICH – Derrick Alexander 13-yard pass from Elvis Grbac (Peter Elezovic kick). Michigan 14–7. Drive:
- MICH – Derrick Alexander 3-yard pass from Elvis Grbac (Peter Elezovic kick). Michigan 21–7. Drive:

Second quarter

- MICH – Tyrone Wheatley 7-yard run (Peter Elezovic kick). Michigan 28–7. Drive:
- MICH – Ed Davis 24-yard run (Peter Elezovic kick). Michigan 35–7. Drive:

Third quarter

- MINN – John Lewis 94-yard pass from Marquel Fleetwood (kick failed). Michigan 35–14. Drive:
- MICH – Derrick Alexander 32-yard pass from Elvis Grbac (Peter Elezovic kick). Michigan 42–14. Drive:
- MICH – Walter Smith 46-yard run (Peter Elezovic kick). Michigan 49–14. Drive:
- MICH – Tyrone Wheatley 2-yard run (Peter Elezovic kick). Michigan 56–14. Drive:
- MICH – Che Foster 16-yard run (Peter Elezovic kick). Michigan 63–14. Drive:

Top passers

- MINN – Marquel Fleetwood – 7/21, 150 yards, TD, INT
- MICH – Elvis Grbac – 14/19, 208 yards, 4 TD

Top rushers

- MINN – Antonio Carter – 6 rushes, 21 yards
- MICH – Tyrone Wheatley – 24 rushes, 148 yards, 2 TD

Top receivers

- MINN – John Lewis – 2 receptions, 96 yards, TD
- MICH – Derrick Alexander – 7 receptions, 130 yards, 4 TD

1,000th game in school history

Elvis Grbac breaks Jim Harbaugh's school record for career passing yardage.

=== Purdue ===
Purdue led #3 ranked Michigan 17-7 at halftime, but the Wolverines rallied in the 2nd half with 17 points to pull out a 24-17 victory over the Boilermakers at Ross-Ade Stadium. Walter Smith caught a 43 yard TD pass from Elvis Grbac for the Wolverines first points. Grbac hit Tony McGee for 10 yards and touchdown to pull Michigan within 17-14, then Jesse Johnson ran 3 yards for the go-ahead touchdown. Pelezovic added a 25 yard field goal. Johnson ran for 118 yards while Grbac finished with 169 yards, completing 17 of 24 passes. Pat Maloney had an interception for the Wolverine defense.

| Team | 1 | 2 | 3 | 4 | Total |
|---|---|---|---|---|---|
| • Michigan | 0 | 7 | 17 | 0 | 24 |
| Purdue | 10 | 7 | 0 | 0 | 17 |

- Date: October 31
- Location: Ross-Ade Stadium
- Game attendance: 37,216

Scoring summary
| Q1 | PUR | O'Leary 34 yard field goal | PUR 3–0 |
| Q1 | PUR | Hunter 5 yard run (O'Leary kick) | PUR 10–0 |
| Q2 | MICH | W. Smith 43 yard pass from Grbac (Elezovic kick) | PUR 10–7 |
| Q2 | PUR | S. Green 5 yard pass from Hunter (O'Leary kick) | PUR 17–7 |
| Q3 | MICH | McGee 10 yard pass from Grbac (Elezovic kick) | PUR 17–14 |
| Q3 | MICH | J. Johnson 3 yard run (Elezovic kick) | MICH 21–17 |
| Q3 | MICH | Elezovic 25 yard field goal | MICH 24–17 |

- MICH: J. Johnson 20 Rush, 118 Yds

=== Northwestern ===
The #4 ranked Wolverines raced to a 30-7 halftime lead behind Derrick Alexander’s 3 touchdown receptions from Elvis Grbac. Alexander finished the game with 3 catches for 91 yards, while teammate Amani Toomer had 3 catches for 112 yards. Tyrone Wheatley had another big day, rushing for 148 yards and a touchdown. Mercury Hayes caught an 11 yard TD pass from Todd Collins. Michigan had 495 yards of total offense while the defense held the Wildcats to 220 yards, with only 8 yards on the ground.

| Team | 1 | 2 | 3 | 4 | Total |
|---|---|---|---|---|---|
| • Wolverines | 21 | 9 | 3 | 7 | 40 |
| Wildcats | 7 | 0 | 0 | 0 | 7 |

- Date: November 7
- Location: Dyche Stadium, Evanston, IL

Scoring summary
| 1 | Michigan | Alexander 32 yard pass from Grbac (Elezovic kick) | Michigan 7–0 |
| 1 | Michigan | Wheatley 14 yard run (Elezovic kick) | Michigan 14–0 |
| 1 | Northwestern | Gissendaner 42 yard pass from Williams (Leahy kick) | Michigan 14–7 |
| 1 | Michigan | Alexander 57 yard pass from Grbac (Elezovic kick) | Michigan 21–7 |
| 2 | Michigan | Safety, ball snapped out of end zone | Michigan 23–7 |
| 2 | Michigan | Alexander 2 yard pass from Grbac (Elezovic kick) | Michigan 30–7 |
| 3 | Michigan | Elezovic 23 yard field goal | Michigan 33–7 |
| 4 | Michigan | Hayes 11 yard pass from Collins (Elezovic kick) | Michigan 40–7 |

=== Illinois ===
Before a packed house of over 106,000 fans at Michigan Stadium, #3 Michigan and Illinois battled to a 22-22 tie. Pete Elezovic had to kick a 39 yard field goal with 16 seconds left to keep Michigan unbeaten on the season. Tyrone Wheatley caught a 50 yard TD pass from Elvis Grbac to give Michigan a 7-0 lead. Jesse Johnson ran for two touchdowns and 121 yards on the ground. His 11 yard run gave the Wolverines a 19-15 lead with 6:56 left in the game. Jason Verduzco scored from 2 yards out to give the Illini a 22-19 lead that held up until Elezovic saved the Wolverines with his field goal. Grbac completed 21 of 29 passes for 278 yards, but threw two costly interceptions. The Wolverines rushed for 245 yards.

=== Ohio State ===
Ohio State pulled within 13-12 of the sixth ranked Wolverines on Kirk Herbstreit's 5-yard touchdown pass to Greg Beatty with 4:24 remaining, but the Buckeyes bypassed an attempt for a two point conversion to kick the extra point that ended up the final score, a 13-13 tie. After falling behind 3-0, Michigan scored on an Elvis Grbac 3 yard run, but Pete Elezovic extra point kick was no good, which proved to be crucial. Grbac was injured on the play and did not return. Todd Collins scored on a 1 yard run to push the Wolverines lead to 13-3 late in the 3rd quarter. The Buckeyes pulled within 13-6 on a Tim Williams 30 yard field goal early in the 4th quarter. Tyrone Wheatley led Michigan with 100 yards rushing, but the passing game was non-existent, accounting for 71 yards.

=== Rose Bowl ===
Michigan vs. Washington

| Team | 1 | 2 | 3 | 4 | Total |
|---|---|---|---|---|---|
| • No. 7 Wolverines | 10 | 7 | 14 | 7 | 38 |
| No. 9 Huskies | 7 | 14 | 10 | 0 | 31 |

- Date: January 1
- Location: Rose Bowl, Pasadena, California
- Game attendance: 94,236
- Tyrone Wheatley 15 Rush, 235 Yds

Trailing, 7-3, the Wolverines energized their fans who made the trip to California on a 49 yard touchdown pass from Elvis Grbac to Tony McGee, which capped a six play, 69 yard drive and provided Michigan the lead after the first quarter. On its next possession, Michigan opened up a 17-7 lead as Tyrone Wheatley, on his way to a 235 yard rushing performance, sprinted untouched 56 yards for a touchdown. In this offensive showdown, the Huskies responded with two straight touchdowns—a 64 yard touchdown pass from Mark Brunell to Jason Shelley and an 18 yard touchdown strike from Brunell to Mark Bruener. Washington took a 21-17 lead into the halftime intermission. Wheatley then went to work, taking advantage of a key block by All-American Steve Everitt on an 88 yard touchdown run—his second long scoring play and a new Rose Bowl record. But the Huskies were far from through. They put together 10 straight points and went ahead 31-24 until Wheatley responded. His third touchdown run of the game—24 yard scamper on a draw play—tied the game at 31 and swung the momentum back to Michigan. The Wolverines' game winning score came on an 80 yard drive, as Grbac, facing third and short from the Huskies' 15 yard line, found McGee at the two. McGee fell into the endzone for the only score of the fourth quarter, the winning points in Michigan's thrilling 38-31 victory.

== Personnel ==
- Head coach: Gary Moeller
- Assistant coaches: Cam Cameron, Lloyd Carr, Mike DeBord, Bill Harris, Jim Herrmann, Fred Jackson, Greg Mattison, Les Miles, Bobby Morrison
- Trainer: Paul Schmidt
- Managers: Joe Allore, Brian Bickner, Kevin Bickner, Milton Heath, Dave Henderson, Andy Riegler, Lance Satterthwaite, Mark Vainisi, Arnando Velasquez, Mike Weiskopf

=== Roster ===
1992 Michigan Wolverines football team roster
Players
Coaches
Offense

| Pos. | # | Name | Class |
|---|---|---|---|
| WR | 1 | Derrick Alexander | Jr |
| QB | 13 | Jason Carr | So |
| QB | 10 | Todd Collins | So |
| RB | | Ed Davis |
| C | 51 | Steve Everitt | Sr |
| RB | | Che Foster |
| QB | 15 | Elvis Grbac | Sr |
| WR | 9 | Mercury Hayes | Fr |
| OT | 77 | Trezelle Jenkins | So |
| TE | 88 | Tony McGee | Sr |
| OT | 69 | Jon Runyan | Fr |
| QB | 16 | Jay Riemersma | So |
| WR | 2 | Walter Smith | Jr |
| WR | 18 | Amani Toomer | Fr |
| RB | 6 | Tyrone Wheatley | So |

Defense

| Pos. | # | Name | Class |
|---|---|---|---|
| S | 20 | Corwin Brown | Sr |
| LB | 91 | Matt Dyson | Jr |
| DT | 97 | Chris Hutchinson | Sr |
| LB | 36 | Steve Morrison | Jr |
| DT | 58 | Rob Vander Leest | So |
| LB | 46 | Marcus Walker | Jr |
| CB | 5 | Coleman Wallace | Sr |
| CB | 8 | Dwayne Ware | Sr |

Special teams

| Pos. | # | Name | Class |
|---|---|---|---|
| K | 16 | Peter Elezovic | Sr |

Head coach

- Gary Moeller

Coordinators/assistant coaches

Legend

- (C) Team captain
- (S) Suspended
- (I) Ineligible
- Injured
- Redshirt

Roster

=== Depth chart ===
Defense

FS
Corwin Brown
Joel Blankenship
Brian Foster

| WILL | JACK | MIKE | SAM |
|---|---|---|---|
| Martin Davis; Matt Dyson | Steve Morrison | Steve Morrison | Marcus Walker; Nate Holdren |
| Mike Nadlicki | William Steuk | Dave Dobreff | Jamie Mignon |
| Dorian Taylor | Mike Vanderbeek | Greg McThomas | Bobby Powers |

SS
Shonte Peoples
Pat Maloney
Lasker Smith

CB
Alfie Burch
Ty Law
Michael Tilmann

| DE | NT | DE |
|---|---|---|
| Robert J Davis | Chris Hutchinson | Tony Henderson |
| Buster Stanley | Ninef Aghakhan | Steve Rekowski |
| Gannon Dudler | Eric Graves | Walter Reggans |

CB
Coleman Wallace
Dwayne Ware
Stephen Jones

Offense

WR
Derrick Alexander
Mercury Hayes
Felman Malveaux

| LT | LG | C | RG | RT |
|---|---|---|---|---|
| Trezelle Jenkins | Doug Skene | Steve Everitt | Joe Cocozzo | Robert Doherty |
| Joe Marinaro | Shawn Miller | Paul Manning | Paul Berry | Mike Lewis |
| Marc Elliot | Paul Manning | Marc Millia | Marc Millia | Troy Plate |

TE
Tony McGee
Marc Burkholder
Damon Jones
John Jaeckin

WR
Walter Smith
Amani Toomer
Julian Swearengin

QB
Elvis Grbac
Todd Collins
Jay Riemersma

RB
Tyrone Wheatley
Jesse Johnson
Ricky Powers

FB
Burnie Legette
Che Foster
Ed Davis

Special teams
PK Peter Elezovic
P Joshua Wuerfel

== Statistical achievements ==
Elvis Grbac established a Big Ten Conference career passing efficiency record that would stand for six seasons until it was surpassed by Joe Germaine. Grbac successfully defended his passing efficiency NCAA Division I FBS championship. On October 24, Derrick Alexander tied the conference single-game record with four touchdown receptions against Minnesota, becoming the fourth athlete to do so. The following season Minnesota's Omar Douglas broke the record with five. No Wolverine has matched this feat.

Tyrone Wheatley was the Big Ten rushing leader with 131.3 yards per conference game and 123.4 yards per game against all opponents. Wheatley also led the conference in scoring (for the first of two consecutive season) with an average of 9.3 points per game in all games, although he trailed Michigan State's Craig Thomas in conference games. Grbac led the conference in passing efficiency for the third consecutive year (157.9 efficiency in conference games and 150.2 in all games).

The team led the Big Ten in rushing offense both in conference games (284.8 yards per game) and all games (268.1 yards per game). It also led in passing efficiency for both conference games (148.3) and all games (148.1). It was the conference leader in total offense both for conference games (463.0 yards per game) and all games (466.9 yards per game). The Wolverines also led the Big Ten in scoring for conference games (35.0 points per game) and all games (35.9 points per game).

The team led the conference in rushing defense for the third of four consecutive years (six times in the 1990s) for all games by holding opponents to 90.8 yards per game. The team also led the conference for the second of five consecutive (six times in the 1990s) in rushing defense against conference opponents (78.6 yards per game). The team led the conference in total defense for all games (305.3), while Ohio State led for conference games. The team was led the conference in quarterback sacks for conference games (4.9 sacks per game) and all games (3.8 sacks per game). It led the conference in net punting average for conference games (35.9 yards), while Wisconsin led for all games.

The team extended the streak that set the conference record for most consecutive conference game wins (19) that stood until Ohio State eclipsed it in 2007. The team still holds the record for most consecutive conference road wins (17).

Wheatley established the following school records: career rushing touchdowns (47), eclipsing Rick Leach's 16-year-old record of 34 and broken six years later by Anthony Thomas; single-season yards per carry (7.34, min 75 carries), eclipsing Bill Daley's 49-year-old record of 6.81 and still standing; single-game yards per carry (11.79 - October 3, min 15 carries), eclipsing Ron Johnson's 24-year-old record of 11.19 and eclipsed by his own 15.70 performance in the January 1, 1993 Rose Bowl, which is still unsurpassed. On September 19 against Oklahoma State, Todd Collins set the school record for single-game pass completions (29), which would last until Tom Brady threw for 31 in 1998. That season, he set the current single-season pass completion record (65.3), surpassing Jim Harbaugh's 65.0 set in 1986 and tied by Elvis Grbac in 1991. Collins and Grbac posted the sixth and seventh four-touchdown pass single-game performance in school history. For Grbac who was the first with two the prior season, this was his third time (a current record). Grbac extended his own career touchdown record set the prior season to 71. John Navarre would reach 72 in 2003. Grbac also ended his career as the school record holder in pass attempts (835), surpassing Steve Smith's 648 set in 1983 and broken by Navarre in 2003; pass completions (522), eclipsing Harbaugh's 387 set in 1986 and broken by Navarre in 2003; completion percentage (62.5), eclipsing Harbaugh's 62.4 and broken by Collins in 1994; career passing efficiency (148.1), eclipsing Harbaugh's 145.6 and still unbroken; passing yards (6460), eclipsing Harbaugh's career yardage record of 5449, but Navarre would eclipse this record in 2003; career 150-yard passing games (23) eclipsing Harbaugh's 19, tied by Collins in 1994 and eclipsed by Navarre in 2003.

== Awards and honors ==
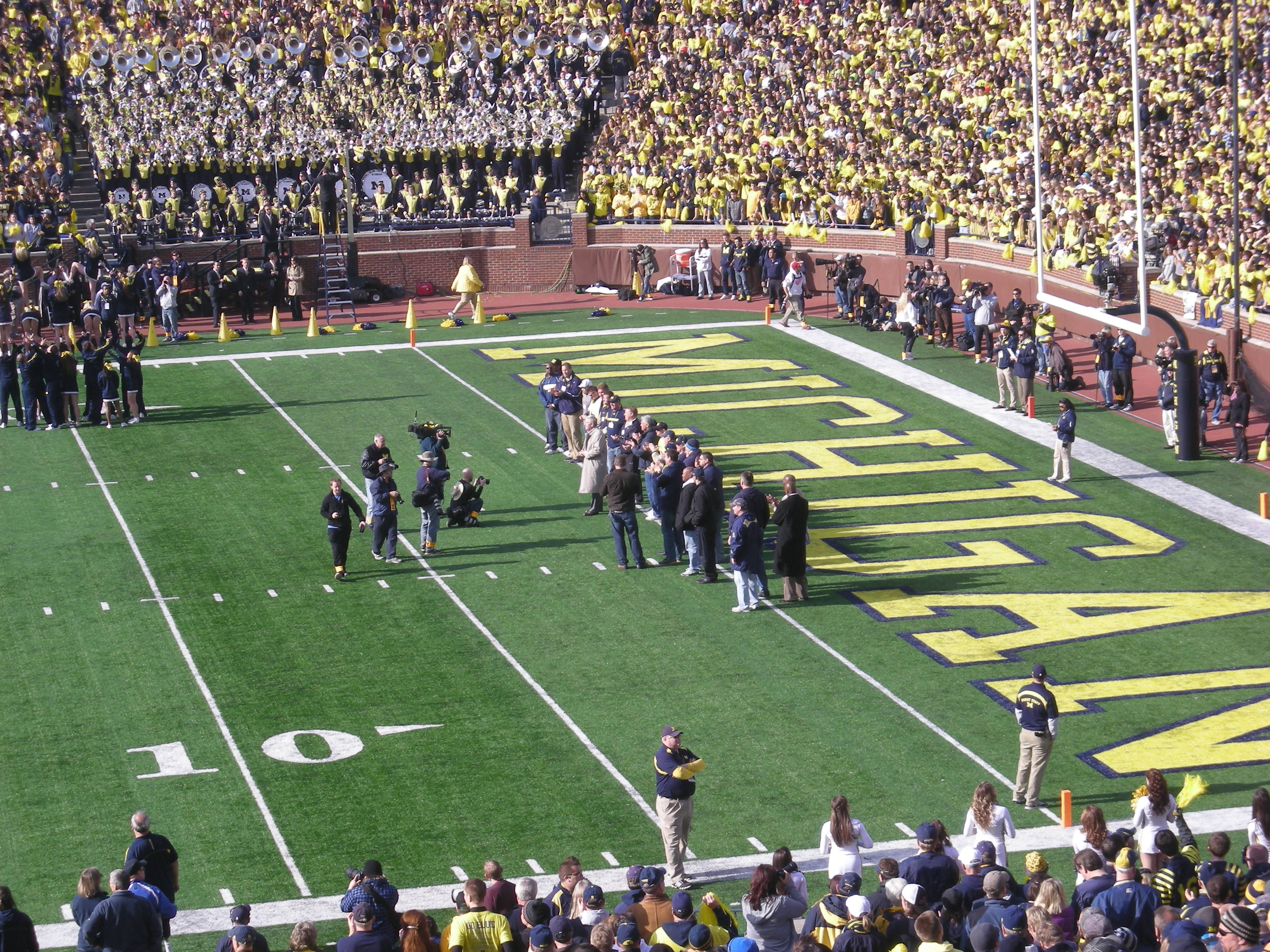
The 1992 team honored at Michigan Stadium on the occasion of its 20-year reunion in 2012.

The individuals in the sections below earned recognition for meritorious performances.

=== National ===
- All-Americans: Joe Cocozzo, Chris Hutchinson, Derrick Alexander
- Academic All-American: Hutchinson (second team)

=== Conference ===
- All-Conference: Elvis Grbac, Chris Hutchinson, Derrick Alexander, Corwin Brown, Joe Cocozzo, Rob Doherty, Matt Dyson, Steve Everitt, Tony McGee, Shonte Peoples, Doug Skene, Tyrone Wheatley
- Big Ten Offensive Player of the Year: Wheatley
- Big Ten Defensive Lineman of the Year: Hutchinson
- Big Ten Dave McClain Coach of the Year: Gary Moeller

=== Team ===
- Captains: Corwin Brown, Elvis Grbac, Chris Hutchinson
- Most Valuable Player: Chris Hutchinson
- Meyer Morton Award: Chris Hutchinson
- John Maulbetsch Award: Tyrone Wheatley
- Frederick Matthei Award: Tony Henderson
- Arthur Robinson Scholarship Award: Chris Hutchinson
- Dick Katcher Award: Chris Hutchinson
- Hugh Rader Jr. Award: Steve Everitt
- Robert P. Ufer Award: Corwin Brown
- Roger Zatkoff Award: Steve Morrison
