= 1992 Ohio State Buckeyes football team =

American college football season

1992 Ohio State Buckeyes football

Florida Citrus Bowl, L 14–21 vs. Georgia
- Conference: Big Ten Conference

Ranking
- Coaches: No. 19
- AP: No. 18
- Record: 8–3–1 (5–2–1 Big Ten)
- Head coach: John Cooper (5th season)
- Offensive coordinator: Joe Hollis (1st season)
- Offensive scheme: Singleback
- Defensive coordinator: Bill Young (5th season)
- Base defense: 3–4
- MVP: Kirk Herbstreit
- Captains: Kirk Herbstreit; Steve Tovar
- Home stadium: Ohio Stadium

1992 Big Ten Conference football standings
	Conf.					Overall
Team	W		L		T	W		L		T
No. 5 Michigan $	6	–	0	–	2	9	–	0	–	3
No. 18 Ohio State	5	–	2	–	1	8	–	3	–	1
Michigan State	5	–	3	–	0	5	–	6	–	0
Illinois	4	–	3	–	1	6	–	5	–	1
Iowa	4	–	4	–	0	5	–	7	–	0
Indiana	3	–	5	–	0	5	–	6	–	0
Wisconsin	3	–	5	–	0	5	–	6	–	0
Purdue	3	–	5	–	0	4	–	7	–	0
Northwestern	3	–	5	–	0	3	–	8	–	0
Minnesota	2	–	6	–	0	2	–	9	–	0
$ – Conference champion; Rankings from AP Poll

The 1992 Ohio State Buckeyes football team was an American football team that represented the Ohio State University as a member of the Big Ten Conference during the 1992 NCAA Division I-A football season. In their fifth year under head coach John Cooper, the Buckeyes compiled an 8–3–1 record (5–2–1 in conference games), finished in second place in the Big Ten, and outscored opponents by a total of 257 to 137. Against ranked opponents, they defeated No. 8 Syracuse and tied with No. 6 Michigan. They concluded the season with a loss to No. 8 Georgia in the 1993 Florida Citrus Bowl. The Buckeyes were ranked No. 18 in the final AP poll.

The Buckeyes gained an average of 171.1 rushing yards and 154.3 passing yards per game. On defense, they held opponents to 111.7 rushing yards and 162.9 passing yards per game. The team's statistical leaders included quarterback Kirk Herbstreit (1,904 passing yards, 58.7% completion percentage), running back Robert Smith (707 rushing yards, 5.8 yards per carry), and wide receiver Brian Stablein (51 receptions for 612 yards). Linebacker Steve Tovar was selected by the American Football Coaches Association (AFCA) as a first-team player on the 1992 All-America team. Tovar, nose tackle Greg Smith, and safety Roger Harper received first-team honors on the 1992 All-Big Ten Conference football team.

The team played its home games at Ohio Stadium in Columbus, Ohio.

== Schedule ==
Date	Time	Opponent	Rank	Site	TV	Result	Attendance	Source
September 5	12:30 p.m.	Louisville*	No. 17	Ohio Stadium; Columbus, OH	ESPN	W 20–19	89,653	
September 12	3:30 p.m.	Bowling Green*	No. 22	Ohio Stadium; Columbus, OH	ABC	W 17–6	94,808	
September 19	6:30 p.m.	at No. 8 Syracuse*	No. 21	Carrier Dome; Syracuse, NY	ESPN	W 35–12	49,629	
October 3	12:30 p.m.	at Wisconsin	No. 12	Camp Randall Stadium; Madison, WI	ESPN	L 16–20	72,203	
October 10	12:30 p.m.	Illinois	No. 21	Ohio Stadium; Columbus, OH (Illibuck)	ESPN	L 16–18	93,982	
October 17	1:30 p.m.	Northwestern		Ohio Stadium; Columbus, OH		W 31–7	90,363	
October 24	3:30 p.m.	at Michigan State		Spartan Stadium; East Lansing, MI	ABC	W 27–17	70,037	
October 31	3:30 p.m.	at Iowa		Kinnick Stadium; Iowa City, IA	ABC	W 38–15	70,397	
November 7	1:30 p.m.	Minnesota	No. 22	Ohio Stadium; Columbus, OH		W 17–0	91,764	
November 14	3:30 p.m.	at Indiana	No. 19	Memorial Stadium; Bloomington, IN	ABC	W 27–10	45,534	
November 21	12:00 p.m.	No. 6 Michigan	No. 17	Ohio Stadium; Columbus, OH (rivalry)	ABC	T 13–13	95,330	
January 1, 1993	1:00 p.m.	vs. No. 8 Georgia*	No. 15	Florida Citrus Bowl; Orlando, FL (Florida Citrus Bowl)	ABC	L 14–21	65,861	
*Non-conference game; Rankings from AP Poll released prior to the game; All times are in Eastern time; Source:

== Roster ==
1992 Ohio State Buckeyes football team roster
Players
Coaches
Offense

Pos.	#	Name	Class
RB	33	Butler By'not'e	Jr
WR	1	DeWayne Carter	So
FB	8	Jeff Cothran	Jr
WR	83	Allen DeGraffenreid	Sr
WR	7	Joey Galloway	So
RB	27	Eddie George	Fr
RB	34	Raymont Harris	Jr
QB	4	Kirk Herbstreit	Sr
OT	67	Alan Kline	Jr
RB	5	Dante Lee	Sr
TE	80	Eric Moss	Fr
QB	11	Bryan Niemeyer	Jr
WR	88	Brian Stablein	Sr
WR	17	Chris Sanders	So
TE	85	Cedric Saunders	Jr
C	69	Brian Smith	Fr
RB	26	Robert Smith	Jr
C	59	Rod Smith	Jr
OT	78	Korey Stringer	Fr
OT	68	Jason Winrow	Jr

Defense

Pos.	#	Name	Class
LB	95	Jim Bell	Fr
CB	29	Bryan Cook	Sr
MG	96	LeShun Daniels	Fr
SS	24	Roger Harper	Sr
FS	13	Chico Nelson	Jr
CB	9	Tito Paul	So
LB	12	Brad Pope	Sr
LB	84	Craig Powell	So
CB	22	Foster Paulk	Sr
LB	58	Steve Tovar	Sr
CB	18	Tim Walton	Jr
DT	72	Dan Wilkinson	So
LB	51	Mark Williams	Jr

Special teams

Pos.	#	Name	Class
C/LS	50	Jim Borchers	Sr
P	10	Joel Kessel	Sr
LS	53	Jason Lynch	Jr
K	23	Tim Williams	Jr

Head coach

- John Cooper

Coordinators/assistant coaches

- Bill Conley – Defensive ends
- Larry Coyer – Defensive Backs
- Joe Hollis - Offensive Coordinator
- Ron Hudson – Quarterbacks
- Lee Owens
- Fred Pagac – Defensive Linebackers
- Mike Stock – Offensive Wide Receivers
- Bill Young – Defensive Coordinator

Legend

- (C) Team captain
- (S) Suspended
- (I) Ineligible
- Injured
- Redshirt

Roster

== Awards and honors ==
- Korey Stringer, Big Ten Freshman of the Year

== 1993 NFL draftees ==
Player	Round	Pick	Position	NFL club
Robert Smith	1	21	Running back	Minnesota Vikings
Roger Harper	2	38	Defensive back	Atlanta Falcons
Steve Tovar	3	59	Linebacker	Cincinnati Bengals
Brian Stablein	8	210	Wide receiver	Denver Broncos
