= 1993 Florida Citrus Bowl =

American college football game

Georgia Bulldogs	Ohio State Buckeyes
(9–2)	(8–2–1)
SEC	Big Ten
21	14
Head coach: Ray Goff	Head coach: John Cooper
AP / Coaches / BC; 8 / 8 / 8	AP / Coaches / BC; 15 / 14 / 14
	1	2	3	4	Total
Georgia	7	0	7	7	21
Ohio State	0	7	7	0	14
- Date: January 1, 1993
- Season: 1992
- Stadium: Florida Citrus Bowl
- Location: Orlando, Florida
- MVP: Garrison Hearst
- Referee: Dayle Phillips (ACC)
- Attendance: 65,861

United States TV coverage
- Network: ABC
- Announcers: Roger Twibell and Tim Brant

The 1993 Florida Citrus Bowl was a college football bowl game played between the Big Ten Conference's Ohio State Buckeyes and the Southeastern Conference's Georgia Bulldogs. The game was dominated by the running back. Georgia's Garrison Hearst had two touchdowns and was named the game's MVP. Ohio State's Robert Smith had a touchdown and ran for over 100 yards. Georgia won 21–14.
