= Elvis Grbac =

American football player (born 1970)

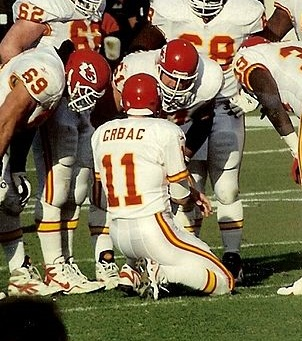
- Grbac with the Kansas City Chiefs in 1997

No. 18, 11, 15
- Position: Quarterback

Personal information
- Born: August 13, 1970 (age 56); Cleveland, Ohio, U.S.
- Listed height: 6 ft 5 in (1.96 m)
- Listed weight: 240 lb (109 kg)

Career information
- High school: St. Joseph (Cleveland)
- College: Michigan (1988–1992)
- NFL draft: 1993: 8th round, 219th overall pick

Career history
- San Francisco 49ers (1993–1996); Kansas City Chiefs (1997–2000); Baltimore Ravens (2001)

Awards and highlights
- Super Bowl champion (XXIX); Pro Bowl (2000); Sammy Baugh Trophy (1992); 2× First-team All-Big Ten (1991, 1992)

Career NFL statistics
- Passing attempts: 2,445
- Passing completions: 1,446
- Completion percentage: 59.1%
- TD–INT: 99–81
- Passing yards: 16,774
- Passer rating: 79.6
- Stats at Pro Football Reference

Elvis M. Grbac (born August 13, 1970) is an American former professional football quarterback who played in the National Football League (NFL) for nine seasons, most notably with the Kansas City Chiefs. He played college football for the Michigan Wolverines, winning the Sammy Baugh Trophy in 1992. Grbac was selected in the eighth round of the 1993 NFL draft by the San Francisco 49ers, where he spent his first four seasons as a backup. Grbac played his next four seasons as the Chiefs' starter.

With the Chiefs, Grbac would help lead the team to two playoff berths and one division title, along with earning Pro Bowl honors in 2000. His tenure would also be known for a quarterback controversy with Rich Gannon during the 1997 season, which drew retrospective criticism due to Gannon having greater success on the rival Oakland Raiders. Grbac played his final season for the Baltimore Ravens. After retiring, he became the athletic director at Villa Angela-St. Joseph High School, the high school he attended.

== Early life ==
Grbac was born in Cleveland, Ohio to Ivan and Cecilija Grbac His father was born in Lanišće, near Buzet, Istria, Croatia (at the time part of Yugoslavia), and his mother was also from Istria. His parents left Croatia in 1967. Grbac has one brother, Engelbert, and two sisters, Maria and Barbara.

Grbac attended St. Joseph High School, where he played basketball and football. One of his high-school teammates was future Heisman Trophy winner Desmond Howard.

== College career ==
Although Grbac initially wished to continue his football career at Ohio State, he changed his mind when the Buckeyes fired head coach Earle Bruce and opted instead to join Howard at the University of Michigan, where he played college football from 1989 to 1992. He led the Wolverines to a Gator Bowl in 1991, three Rose Bowls in 1990, 1992 and 1993 and is best remembered for playing with wide receiver Desmond Howard during Howard's Heisman-winning season in 1991. In 1991 Grbac's pass to Howard sealed a 24–14 victory over Notre Dame. In the game Grbac completed 20-of-22 passes, a record for a Notre Dame opponent. He finished his career at Michigan as the school's all-time leader in passing attempts (835), completions (522), passing yards (6,460) and passing touchdowns (71). These records were later broken by John Navarre in 2003 and surpassed by Chad Henne in 2006–2007. In 1992, he won the Sammy Baugh Trophy.

Grbac also established the Big Ten Conference career passing efficiency record that would stand for six seasons until it was surpassed by Joe Germaine. Grbac was a two-time National Collegiate Athletic Association (NCAA) passing efficiency champion during his last two seasons. He was a three-time Big Ten champion in this statistic.

== Professional career ==
Pre-draft measurables
Height	Weight	Arm length	Hand span	40-yard dash	10-yard split	20-yard split	20-yard shuttle	Vertical jump	Wonderlic
6 ft 5 1/8 in (1.96 m)	232 lb (105 kg)	33 1/4 in (0.84 m)	9 1/8 in (0.23 m)	4.81 s	1.69 s	2.75 s	4.50 s	31.5 in (0.80 m)	16
All values from NFL Combine

=== San Francisco 49ers ===
Grbac was selected in the eighth round (219th overall) of the 1993 NFL draft by the San Francisco 49ers, where he served as Steve Young's backup from 1994 to 1996.

Grbac had an injury and was taken in and out of the lineup by coach George Seifert; Grbac played in 11 games in his rookie season only throwing for two touchdown passes in games against the Minnesota Vikings and the Tampa Bay Buccaneers; he threw one interception. During his rookie season he posted a QB rating of 98.2, with two touchdowns, and completing 35-of-55 pass attempts. He appeared in a total of sixteen games with the 49ers, five of them as the starting quarterback. In Week 11, he led the 49ers to an upset victory over the eventual Super Bowl champion Dallas Cowboys, 38–20, throwing for two touchdowns and running for a third. Grbac ended the season with a QB rating of 96.6, 183 passes attempted and 127 completed, eight passing touchdowns and two rushing, for a total of 1,469 yards gained. During the 1996 season, he played a total of 15 regular season games, four as a starter, passing for 10 touchdowns and rushing for two, with a total of 122 passes completed and 1,236 yards gained. In 1997, he signed a contract with the Kansas City Chiefs becoming their quarterback.

=== Kansas City Chiefs ===
Grbac replaced Steve Bono as the Chiefs starter in 1997. He orchestrated a Monday Night Football comeback in Week Two against the divisional rival Oakland Raiders. Despite trailing by two touchdowns late in the second half, he rallied the Chiefs by directing a six-play, 80-yard touchdown drive without the benefit of a single time-out, culminating that comeback with a 32-yard game-winner to Andre Rison with 0:03 remaining to seal a 28–27 Chiefs win.

In the 1997 season, Grbac played for the Chiefs during the season they won their fourth AFC West Division championship. The team finished the year with six consecutive victories, a first in team history, but with Rich Gannon at QB. The 1997 season was also the beginning of a quarterback controversy, when Grbac started the first nine games and suffered an injury, leading to Rich Gannon's substitution for the next six games. Grbac would return in the team's season finale. Gannon won five consecutive starts down the stretch to help the Chiefs earn home-field advantage with a 13–3 record. Grbac was a talented thrower, while Gannon was an aggressive leader who demanded the most of his players. Grbac was selected by coach Marty Schottenheimer to start the team's playoff game against the Denver Broncos, which the Chiefs would lose 14–10 amid an ineffective performance from Grbac. Chiefs fans were divided over whether Gannon or Grbac should lead the team. Eventually, Grbac was selected to remain the Chiefs starting quarterback; Gannon was released and signed with the Raiders in 1999. In 1998, the Chiefs struggled in the highly competitive AFC West. Grbac completed only 98-of-188 attempts, for five touchdowns, and gained 1,142 yards in this season. For 1999, the Chiefs won 2nd place in the AFC West. Grbac had a 9–7 record, starting all 16 games. In the final game of the season against the Oakland Raiders, the Chiefs were denied a trip to the playoffs and an AFC West division title when Raiders kicker Joe Nedney kicked a game-winning field-goal in overtime. In 2000, Grbac passed for 4,169 yards and 28 touchdowns with a passer rating of 89.9 en route to the 2001 Pro Bowl.

Grbac finished his four seasons in Kansas City by passing for 10,643 yards, 66 touchdowns, and 47 interceptions with a regular season record of 26–21 and a postseason record of 0–2. Despite some success, Grbac became unpopular among Chiefs fans because the team's decision to start him over Gannon, who would be named MVP with the Raiders in 2002 and led them to Super Bowl XXXVII.

On the June 13, 2023, edition of The Program with Soren Petro radio show, former Chiefs offensive lineman Tim Grunhard revealed that Grbac threw a Christmas party for his teammates in 2000 that was only attended by approximately 10 players, which upset Grbac. Grunhard said he addressed the team about the lack of support the next week and surmised the party was not well attended because a significant portion of the Chiefs' roster did not particularly like Grbac due to his serious personality and lack of bonding with colleagues.

=== Baltimore Ravens ===
Grbac signed a free-agent contract with the Baltimore Ravens in 2001 to replace former starter Trent Dilfer. The contract was for over five years and was worth $30 million. While Dilfer had been the starting quarterback of the Baltimore team that won Super Bowl XXXV, he was seen as a game manager who benefited from a dominant defense and the Ravens believed they could improve at quarterback.

Although the Ravens recorded a 10–6 regular season record and qualified for the playoffs, Grbac's performance was considered a disappointment. He performed statistically below Dilfer's performance in the previous season and two of the Ravens' wins occurred when Randall Cunningham started as a quarterback. During the postseason, the Ravens defeated the Miami Dolphins in the Wild Card Round 20–3 but were later defeated 27–10 by the Pittsburgh Steelers in the divisional round; Grbac threw three interceptions and no touchdowns in the loss.

At the end of the season, the Ravens released Grbac in a salary cap move after he refused to renegotiate his contract. At the time of his retirement, Grbac had been in negotiations with the Denver Broncos as a backup to Brian Griese, but Grbac opted for retirement. Baltimore's free agent signing of Grbac is considered among the league's worst due to his inefficient performance and lasting only one season with the team.

== Career statistics ==
=== NFL ===
Year	Team	Games			Passing							
Year	Team	GP	GS	Record	Att	Cmp	Pct	Yds	TD	Int	Lng	Rtg
1994	SF	11	0	–	50	35	70.0	393	2	1	42	98.2
1995	SF	16	5	3–2	183	127	69.4	1,469	8	5	81	96.6
1996	SF	15	4	3–1	197	122	61.9	1,236	8	10	40	72.2
1997	KC	10	10	8–2	314	179	57.0	1,943	11	6	55T	79.1
1998	KC	8	6	2–4	188	98	52.1	1,142	5	12	65	53.1
1999	KC	16	16	9–7	499	294	58.9	3,389	22	15	86	81.7
2000	KC	15	15	7–8	547	326	59.6	4,169	28	14	81	89.9
2001	BAL	14	14	8–6	467	265	56.7	3,033	15	18	77	71.1
Career		106	70	40–30	2,445	1,446	59.1	16,774	99	81	86T	79.6

=== College ===
Season	Team	Passing							Rushing			
Season	Team	Cmp	Att	Yds	Pct	TD	Int	Rtg	Att	Yds	Avg	TD
1989	Michigan	73	116	824	62.9	8	3	140.2	20	-103	-5.2	0
1990	Michigan	155	266	1,911	58.3	21	10	137.2	22	17	0.8	0
1991	Michigan	165	254	2,085	65.0	25	6	161.7	23	-103	-4.5	0
1992	Michigan	129	199	1,640	64.8	17	12	150.2	15	-50	-3.3	1
Career		522	835	6,460	62.5	71	31	148.1	80	-239	-3.0	1

== People's Sexiest Athlete ==
Grbac was featured as People's Sexiest Athlete in 1998. Sportswriter Jeff Pearlman said this was a mistake by a photographer who, under instructions to profile "the Chiefs quarterback", accidentally took pictures of Grbac instead of the intended Rich Gannon. The story was later confirmed by a People employee.

== Coaching career ==
Grbac lives in Chagrin Falls and was an assistant quarterbacks coach for St. Ignatius High School in Cleveland, Ohio. On April 10, 2019, Grbac was named the athletic director and head football coach at his alma mater Villa Angela-St. Joseph High School. In addition to his roles in the athletic department, he will also be the head of the Marianist Urban Student Program (MUSP) at the school.

== Personal life ==
Grbac has a brother, Engelbert, and two sisters, Maria and Barbara. He lives in Chagrin Falls, just outside Cleveland, with his wife Lori (née Immarino) and his three children: Ella, Jack, and Calvin. Grbac reverted to Catholicism when he was going through his "dark times".

== See also ==
- List of 500-yard passing games in the National Football League
- List of NCAA major college football yearly passing leaders
- Lists of Michigan Wolverines football passing leaders
