= 1992 Iowa Hawkeyes football team =

American college football season

1992 Iowa Hawkeyes football
- Conference: Big Ten Conference
- Record: 5–7 (4–4 Big Ten)
- Head coach: Hayden Fry (14th season)
- Offensive coordinator: Don Patterson (1st season)
- Offensive scheme: Pro-style
- Defensive coordinator: Bill Brashier (14th season)
- Base defense: 5–2
- Captains: Mike Devlin; Bret Bielema
- Home stadium: Kinnick Stadium

1992 Big Ten Conference football standings
	Conf.					Overall
Team	W		L		T	W		L		T
No. 5 Michigan $	6	–	0	–	2	9	–	0	–	3
No. 18 Ohio State	5	–	2	–	1	8	–	3	–	1
Michigan State	5	–	3	–	0	5	–	6	–	0
Illinois	4	–	3	–	1	6	–	5	–	1
Iowa	4	–	4	–	0	5	–	7	–	0
Indiana	3	–	5	–	0	5	–	6	–	0
Wisconsin	3	–	5	–	0	5	–	6	–	0
Purdue	3	–	5	–	0	4	–	7	–	0
Northwestern	3	–	5	–	0	3	–	8	–	0
Minnesota	2	–	6	–	0	2	–	9	–	0
$ – Conference champion; Rankings from AP Poll

The 1992 Iowa Hawkeyes football team represented the University of Iowa as a member of the Big Ten Conference during the 1992 NCAA Division I-A football season. Led by 14th-year head coach Hayden Fry, the Hawkeyes compiled an overall record of 5–7 with a mark of 4–4 in conference play, placing fifth in the Big Ten. The team played home games at Kinnick Stadium in Iowa City, Iowa.

== Schedule ==
Date	Time	Opponent	Rank	Site	TV	Result	Attendance	Source
August 29	8:00 pm	vs. NC State*	No. 16	Giants Stadium; East Rutherford, NJ (Kickoff Classic)	NBC	L 14–24	46,251	
September 5	7:00 pm	No. 1 Miami (FL)*	No. 23	Kinnick Stadium; Iowa City, IA	ABC	L 7–24	70,397	
September 12	11:30 am	Iowa State*		Kinnick Stadium; Iowa City, IA (rivalry)	ESPN	W 21–7	70,397	
September 26	2:30 pm	at No. 10 Colorado*		Folsom Field; Boulder, CO	ABC	L 12–28	52,355	
October 3	2:30 pm	at No. 4 Michigan		Michigan Stadium; Ann Arbor, MI	ABC	L 28–52	106,132	
October 10	1:00 pm	Wisconsin		Kinnick Stadium; Iowa City, IA (rivalry)		W 23–22	70,397	
October 17	11:30 am	at Illinois		Memorial Stadium; Champaign, IL	ESPN	W 24–14	70,314	
October 24	1:00 pm	Purdue^{†}		Kinnick Stadium; Iowa City, IA		L 16–27	70,397	
October 31	2:30 pm	Ohio State		Kinnick Stadium; Iowa City, IA	ABC	L 15–38	70,397	
November 7	12:00 pm	at Indiana		Memorial Stadium; Bloomington, IN		W 14–0	44,311	
November 14	1:00 pm	Northwestern		Kinnick Stadium; Iowa City, IA		W 56–14	68,249	
November 21	6:00 pm	at Minnesota		Hubert H. Humphrey Metrodome; Minneapolis, MN (rivalry)		L 13–28	57,368	
*Non-conference game; ^{†}Homecoming; Rankings from AP Poll released prior to the game; All times are in Central time; Source:

== Game summaries ==
=== Miami (FL) ===
#1 Miami at #23 Iowa

Team	1	2	3	4	Total
• Hurricanes	3	7	0	14	24
Hawkeyes	0	0	0	7	7

- Date: September 5
- Location: Kinnick Stadium
  Iowa City, IA
- Game attendance: 70,397
- TV announcers (ABC): Keith Jackson, Bob Griese, Jack Arute
- Sources: Box Score and Game Story

Scoring summary
1	UM	Prewitt 27-yard field goal	Miami 3–0
2	UM	Williams 11-yard pass from Torretta (Prewitt kick)	Miami 10–0
4	UM	L. Jones 1-yard run (Prewitt kick)	Miami 17–0
4	Iowa	Jasper 31-yard pass from Hartlieb (Krieder kick)	Miami 17–7
4	UM	Spencer 17-yard pass from Torretta (Prewitt kick)	Miami 24–7

Eventual Heisman Trophy winner Gino Torretta threw for a Kinnick Stadium record 433 yards.

=== Northwestern ===
Northwestern at Iowa

Team	1	2	3	4	Total
Wildcats	7	0	7	0	14
• Hawkeyes	7	21	14	14	56

- Date: November 14
- Location: Kinnick Stadium
  Iowa City, IA
- Game attendance: 68,249
- Sources: Box Score and Game Story

Scoring summary
1	Iowa	Cross 24-yard pass from Burmeister (Romano kick)	Iowa 7–0
1	NW	Lundy 1-yard run (Leahy kick)	Tied 7–7
2	Iowa	Anttila 45-yard pass from Burmeister (kick failed)	Iowa 13–7
2	Iowa	Cross 5-yard pass from Burmeister (Russell pass from Burmeister)	Iowa 21–7
2	Iowa	Anttila 15-yard pass from Burmeister (Romano kick)	Iowa 28–7
3	Iowa	Terry 5-yard run (Romano kick)	Iowa 35–7
3	NW	Williams 1-yard run (Leahy kick)	Iowa 35–14
3	Iowa	Crank 43-yard kickoff return (Romano kick)	Iowa 42–14
4	Iowa	Montgomery 1-yard run (Romano kick)	Iowa 49–14
4	Iowa	Terry 4-yard run (Romano kick)	Iowa 56–14

== Roster ==
1992 Iowa Hawkeyes football team roster
Players
Coaches
Offense

Pos.	#	Name	Class
TE	87	Alan Cross	Sr
OT	65	Scott Davis	Sr
RG	55	Beef Ferroni
C	60	Mike Devlin	Sr
WR	3	Danan Hughes	Sr
WR	83	Harold Jasper	So
FB	34	Lew Montgomery	Sr
OL	73	Ted Velicer	Sr
FB	46	Matt Whitaker	Sr
RB	23	Paul Kujawa	Sr

Defense

Pos.	#	Name	Class
DL	91	Bret Bielema	Sr
DE	95	Larry Blue	Jr
NG	88	Maurea Crain	Jr
LB	45	Bob Diaco	Fr
LB	49	Teddy Joe Faley	Sr
DB	5	Carlos James	Sr
DT	93	Jeff Nelson	Sr
CB	6	Scott Plate	Jr
DL	64	Mike Wells	Jr
DB	18	Doug Buch	Sr

Special teams

Pos.	#	Name	Class
P	94	Scott Fisher	Sr
K	1	Andy Kreider	Jr
K	17	Todd Romano	Fr

Head coach

- Hayden Fry

Coordinators/assistant coaches

- Carl Jackson – Offensive Coordinator
- Bill Brashier – Defensive Coordinator
- Milan Vooletich – Defensive ends

Legend

- (C) Team captain
- (S) Suspended
- (I) Ineligible
- Injured
- Redshirt

== Awards and honors ==
- Mike Devlin, Center - Big Ten Offensive Lineman of the Year, First-team All-American

== Team players in the 1993 NFL draft ==
Player	Position	Round	Pick	NFL club
Mike Devlin	Center	5	136	Buffalo Bills
Scott Davis	Guard	6	150	New York Giants
Danan Hughes	Wide Receiver	7	186	Kansas City Chiefs
