= 1992 Northwestern Wildcats football team =

American college football season

1992 Northwestern Wildcats football
- Conference: Big Ten Conference
- Record: 3–8 (3–5 Big Ten)
- Head coach: Gary Barnett (1st season)
- Offensive coordinator: Greg Meyer (1st season)
- Defensive coordinator: Ron Vanderlinden (1st season)
- Captains: Frank Boudreaux; David Cross
- Home stadium: Dyche Stadium

1992 Big Ten Conference football standings
	Conf.					Overall
Team	W		L		T	W		L		T
No. 5 Michigan $	6	–	0	–	2	9	–	0	–	3
No. 18 Ohio State	5	–	2	–	1	8	–	3	–	1
Michigan State	5	–	3	–	0	5	–	6	–	0
Illinois	4	–	3	–	1	6	–	5	–	1
Iowa	4	–	4	–	0	5	–	7	–	0
Indiana	3	–	5	–	0	5	–	6	–	0
Wisconsin	3	–	5	–	0	5	–	6	–	0
Purdue	3	–	5	–	0	4	–	7	–	0
Northwestern	3	–	5	–	0	3	–	8	–	0
Minnesota	2	–	6	–	0	2	–	9	–	0
$ – Conference champion; Rankings from AP Poll

The 1992 Northwestern Wildcats team represented Northwestern University during the 1992 NCAA Division I-A football season. In their first year under head coach Gary Barnett, the Wildcats compiled a 3–8 record (3–5 against Big Ten Conference opponents) and finished in ninth place in the Big Ten Conference.

The team's offensive leaders were quarterback Len Williams with 2,110 passing yards, Dennis Lundy with 688 rushing yards, and Lee Gissendaner with 846 receiving yards. Gissendaner was also selected by the Associated Press as a first-team wide receiver on the 1992 All-Big Ten Conference football team.

== Schedule ==
Date	Opponent	Site	TV	Result	Attendance	Source
September 5	vs. No. 3 Notre Dame*	Soldier Field; Chicago, IL (rivalry)	ABC	L 7–42	64,877	
September 12	at Boston College*	Alumni Stadium; Chestnut Hill, MA		L 0–49	28,888	
September 19	at No. 18 Stanford*	Stanford Stadium; Stanford, CA		L 24–35	42,198	
October 3	at Purdue	Ross–Ade Stadium; West Lafayette, IN		W 28–14	38,728	
October 10	Indiana	Dyche Stadium; Evanston, IL		L 3–28	34,689	
October 17	at Ohio State	Ohio Stadium; Columbus, OH		L 7–31	90,363	
October 24	at Illinois	Memorial Stadium; Champaign, IL (rivalry)		W 27–26	52,332	
October 31	Michigan State	Dyche Stadium; Evanston, IL		L 26–27	31,101	
November 7	No. 4 Michigan	Dyche Stadium; Evanston, IL (rivalry)	ESPN	L 7–40	37,903	
November 14	at Iowa	Kinnick Stadium; Iowa City, IA		L 14–56	68,249	
November 21	Wisconsin	Dyche Stadium; Evanston, IL		W 27–25	28,265	
*Non-conference game; Rankings from AP Poll released prior to the game

== Roster ==
1992 Northwestern Wildcats football team roster
Players
Coaches
Offense

Pos.	#	Name	Class
OT	76	Todd Baczek	Jr
WR	2	Lee Gissendaner	Jr
RB	34	Dennis Lundy	So
OT	70	Matt O'Dwyer	Jr
OT	72	Kevin Peterson	Fr
G	51	Jeff Pietrowski	Sr
QB	10	Steve Schnur	Fr
WR	7	Mike Senters	Jr
QB	12	Len Williams	So

Defense

Pos.	#	Name	Class
LB	54	Jason Behrendt	Jr
LB	90	Jason Cunningham	Sr
DT	89	Larry Curry	Fr
LB	59	Jason Donnell	Fr
DT	97	Scott Hauser	Jr
LB	53	Steve Ostrowski	Jr
DB	32	Anthony Purkett	Sr

Special teams

Pos.	#	Name	Class

Head coach

- Gary Barnett

Coordinators/assistant coaches

Legend

- (C) Team captain
- (S) Suspended
- (I) Ineligible
- Injured
- Redshirt
