= Ben Hesen =

American swimmer (born 1986)

Personal information
- Full name: Benedict Hesen
- Nickname: Buck
- Nationality: United States
- Born: February 15, 1986 (age 40) Louisville, Kentucky, U.S.
- Height: 6 ft 2 in (188 cm)

Sport
- Sport: Swimming
- Strokes: Backstroke
- College team: Indiana University Bloomington

Benedict "Ben" Hesen (born February 15, 1986) is an American swimmer from Jeffersonville, Indiana. He is the son of Ben and Cheryl Hesen, and has one brother. He attended Jeffersonville High School and grew up swimming for Keith Gast at Pacesetter Aquatics. He was a member of the U.S. National Team in the 100M backstroke.

== Career ==
=== Prep ===
Swimming started at an early age for Hesen, who began taking lessons at the age of five. Quickly escalating into a full-time commitment, he was passionate about swimming, but never saw much opportunity in it until a meteoric rise between his freshman and sophomore year at Jeffersonville High School in Indiana. Eventually, he ended up winning three straight Indiana High School Athletic Association (IHSAA) state championships in the 100-yard backstroke from 2002 to 2004 as well as the 100-yard butterfly at the 2004 IHSAA State Championships. He was also a 2002, 2003 and 2004 NISCA All-American in the 100 backstroke. Upon graduation, he was regarded as one of the nation's top high school backstrokers.

=== Indiana University ===
2005–2006

During his sophomore year at Indiana University, Hesen tied for fourth in the 100 back at NCAAs and claimed a trio of All-America certificates during the NCAA Championships, including ninth-place finishes on both the 200 medley and 400 medley relays. The ninth-place effort in the 400 medley was the best for Indiana University since 1980. He was a member of the school and meet record setting Big Ten champion 200-yard medley relay unit. He helped set the school record in the 400-yard medley relay with a second-place effort at Big Tens and eclipsed the school record in the 100 back with his lead leg of 46.44 in the 400-yard medley. He earned Big Ten Swimmer of the Week once and concluded the season among IU's all-time top 20 in the 100 back (first), 200 back (fifth) and 100 fly (fifth).

2006–2007

During his junior year, Hesen finished second at the NCAA Championships in the 100 back with a school-record time of 45.45 and took eighth in the 200 back to become the first Indiana University swimmer since 1979 to reach the finals of two individual events at NCAAs. He earned first team All-America honors in the 100-yard backstroke and 200-yard backstroke and honorable mention accolades in both medley relays. He won the Big Ten championship in the 100 back, doing so in league-record time (45.52). He earned All-Big Ten first team honors, led Indiana with 24 event wins on the season, was named CollegeSwimming.com's National Collegiate Swimmer of the Week on November 1, and went undefeated in the 100 back during the regular season. He placed third in the 100-meter backstroke at the 2007 U.S. National Championships, earning a spot on the U.S. National Team.

2007–2008

Hesen set an American record at the 2008 US Olympic Trials in the 50 meter backstroke by going 24.70 for the 50 split of a 100 backstroke time trial. He won the NCAA Championship in the 100 backstroke with a school-record time of 44.72. His win is the first NCAA swimming title for the Hoosiers since Jim Montgomery captured the 100 freestyle and 200 freestyle in 1976. He earned Indiana Male Athlete of the Year award. He was named co-Big Ten Swimmer of the Year and Swimmer of the Championships after taking league titles in the 100 backstroke, 200 backstroke, 100 butterfly and 200 medley relay (1:25.85). At the BIG TEN Championships at the University of Michigan, He took the 100 backstroke title in a time of 45.92, breaking the Canham Natatorium record of 46.48 set by Michael Phelps in 2005. He earned first team All-Big Ten and was the first Indiana University swimmer to win three individual swimming titles since Chuck Sharpe in 1980.

=== 2014–present ===
Hesen is now a fireman with the Jeffersonville Fire Department.
