= 1992 Michigan State Spartans football team =

American college football season

1992 Michigan State Spartans football
- Conference: Big Ten Conference
- Record: 5–6 (5–3 Big Ten)
- Head coach: George Perles (10th season)
- Offensive coordinator: Morris Watts (6th season)
- Defensive coordinator: Norm Parker (5th season)
- MVP: Mill Coleman
- Captains: Tico Duckett; Toby Heaton
- Home stadium: Spartan Stadium

1992 Big Ten Conference football standings
	Conf.					Overall
Team	W		L		T	W		L		T
No. 5 Michigan $	6	–	0	–	2	9	–	0	–	3
No. 18 Ohio State	5	–	2	–	1	8	–	3	–	1
Michigan State	5	–	3	–	0	5	–	6	–	0
Illinois	4	–	3	–	1	6	–	5	–	1
Iowa	4	–	4	–	0	5	–	7	–	0
Indiana	3	–	5	–	0	5	–	6	–	0
Wisconsin	3	–	5	–	0	5	–	6	–	0
Purdue	3	–	5	–	0	4	–	7	–	0
Northwestern	3	–	5	–	0	3	–	8	–	0
Minnesota	2	–	6	–	0	2	–	9	–	0
$ – Conference champion; Rankings from AP Poll

The 1992 Michigan State Spartans football team competed on behalf of Michigan State University as a member of the Big Ten Conference during the 1992 NCAA Division I-A football season. Led by tenth-year head coach George Perles, the Spartans compiled an overall record of 5–6 with a mark of 5–3 in conference play, placing third in the Big Ten Michigan State played home games at Spartan Stadium in East Lansing, Michigan.

== Schedule ==
Date	Time	Opponent	Site	TV	Result	Attendance	Source
September 12	1:00 p.m.	Central Michigan*	Spartan Stadium; East Lansing, MI		L 20–24	65,123	
September 19	3:30 p.m.	No. 7 Notre Dame*	Spartan Stadium; East Lansing, MI (rivalry)	ABC	L 31–52	76,188	
September 26	12:00 p.m.	at No. 25 Boston College*	Alumni Stadium; Chestnut Hill, MA		L 0–14	32,498	
October 3	1:00 p.m.	Indiana^{†}	Spartan Stadium; East Lansing, MI (rivalry)		W 42–31	65,516	
October 10	1:00 p.m.	at No. 3 Michigan	Michigan Stadium; Ann Arbor, MI (rivalry)	ABC	L 10–35	106,788	
October 17	7:00 p.m.	at Minnesota	Hubert H. Humphrey Metrodome; Minneapolis, MN		W 20–15	35,594	
October 24	3:30 p.m.	Ohio State	Spartan Stadium; East Lansing, MI	ABC	L 17–27	70,037	
October 31	2:00 p.m.	at Northwestern	Dyche Stadium; Evanston, IL		W 27–26	31,101	
November 7	3:30 p.m.	Wisconsin	Spartan Stadium; East Lansing, MI	ABC	W 26–10	45,219	
November 14	1:00 p.m.	Purdue	Spartan Stadium; East Lansing, MI		W 35–13	36,803	
November 21	2:00 p.m.	at Illinois	Memorial Stadium; Champaign, IL		L 10–14	40,552	
*Non-conference game; ^{†}Homecoming; Rankings from AP Poll released prior to the game; All times are in Eastern time; Source:

== Roster ==
1992 Michigan State Spartans football team roster
Players
Coaches
Offense

Pos.	#	Name	Class
RB	49	Brice Abrams	Sr
WR	14	Tim Bryan	Sr
OT	79	Brian DeMarco	So
RB	35	Tico Duckett
TE	23	Ty Hallock	Sr
OT	63	Shane Hannah	So
G	67	Toby Heaton	Sr
TE	85	Mitch Lyons	Sr
QB	16	Jim Miller	Jr
G	50	Roosevelt Wagner	Sr

Defense

Pos.	#	Name	Class
SS	24	Myron Bell	Jr
DT	93	Mike Edwards	Sr
LB	83	Rob Fredrickson	Jr
DT	99	Willie Hill	Sr
FS	2	Corey Keyes	Jr
SS	37	Steve Wasylk	Jr
DB	18	Brian Winters	Jr

Special teams

Pos.	#	Name	Class

Head coach

- George Perles

Coordinators/assistant coaches

- Dan Enos (Graduate assistant)

Legend

- (C) Team captain
- (S) Suspended
- (I) Ineligible
- Injured
- Redshirt

== 1993 NFL draft ==
The following players were selected in the 1993 NFL draft.

Player	Round	Pick	Position	NFL team
Mitch Lyons	6	151	Tight end	Atlanta Falcons
Ty Hallock	7	174	Linebacker	Detroit Lions
