= Gary Moeller =

American football player and coach (1941–2022)

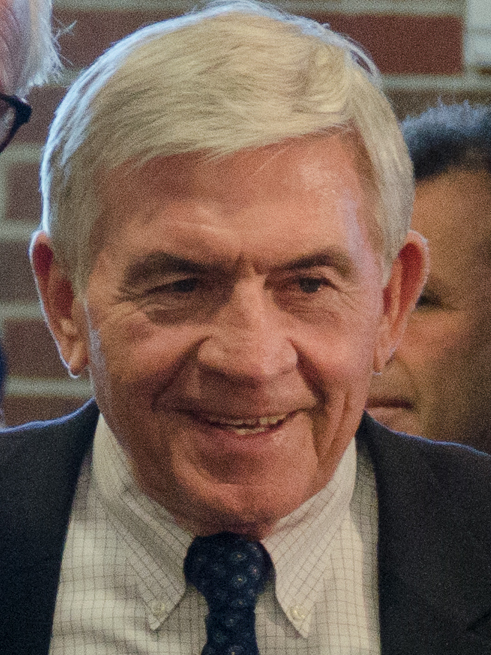
- Moeller in 2014

Biographical details
- Born: January 26, 1941; Lima, Ohio, U.S.
- Died: July 11, 2022 (aged 81); Lima, Ohio, U.S.

Playing career
- 1960–1962: Ohio State
- 1963: Grand Rapids Blazers
- Positions: Linebacker, center

Coaching career (HC unless noted)
- 1964–1967: Bellefontaine HS (OH)
- 1967–1968: Miami (OH) (assistant)
- 1969–1972: Michigan (DE)
- 1973–1976: Michigan (DC)
- 1977–1979: Illinois
- 1980–1981: Michigan (QB)
- 1982–1986: Michigan (DC)
- 1987–1989: Michigan (OC)
- 1990–1994: Michigan
- 1995–1996: Cincinnati Bengals (TE)
- 1997–2000: Detroit Lions (LB)
- 2000: Detroit Lions
- 2001: Jacksonville Jaguars (DC)
- 2002–2003: Chicago Bears (LB)

Head coaching record
- Overall: 50–37–6 (college); 4–3 (NFL)
- Bowls: 4–1

Accomplishments and honors

Championships
- As coach: 3× Big Ten (1990–1992); As player: National (1961)

Awards
- 2× Big Ten Coach of the Year (1991–1992); Second-team All-Big Ten (1962)

Gary Oscar Moeller (/ˈmoʊlər/; January 26, 1941 – July 11, 2022) was an American football coach best known for being head coach at the University of Michigan from 1990 to 1994. During his five seasons at Michigan, he won 44 games, lost 13 and tied 3 for a winning percentage of .758. In Big Ten Conference play, his teams won 30 games, lost 8, and tied 2 for a winning percentage of .775, and won or shared conference titles in 1990, 1991 and 1992. He left Michigan in 1995 following a drunken incident. Moeller also coached in professional football and was the head coach of the Detroit Lions for part of the 2000 season. He was the father of former Cleveland Browns offensive line coach Andy Moeller.

== Player ==
Moeller graduated from Lima Senior High School in 1959, and afterwards attended Ohio State University. He saw his first action on the varsity football team in 1960 as an offensive guard. He switched to linebacker in 1961 and was named an honorable mention all-conference selection by United Press International (UPI) and Associated Press (AP). Moeller served as co-captain in his senior year along with Bob Vogel.

After graduating in 1963, Moeller was drafted by the San Francisco 49ers 66th overall in the fifth round of the NFL draft, but did not play for the team. He instead played for the Grand Rapids Blazers of the United Football League (UFL).

== Coaching ==
=== High school and college football ===
Moeller quit professional football during the 1964 training camp and entered the coaching ranks with Bellefontaine High School in Ohio. He served there as head coach and defensive line coach for several years until joining Bo Schembechler at Miami University in 1967. He moved with Schembechler to Michigan in 1969, where he served as defensive ends coach until 1973, when he was promoted to defensive coordinator. Schembechler had also been an assistant coach at Ohio State when Moeller was a player, and both were members of the FWAA 1961 National Championship team.

=== Illinois ===
Moeller was hired by the University of Illinois as head football coach in 1977, on a five-year contract. After posting a 6–24–3 record in three seasons with the school, he was fired.

=== Back to Michigan ===
Moeller rejoined Michigan in 1980 as an assistant to head coach Bo Schembechler. He was promoted to defensive coordinator in 1982. He led the Michigan defense from 1982 until his position being changed to offensive coordinator in 1987. When coach Schembechler underwent heart surgery prior to the final game of the season, the Hall of Fame Bowl, and could not coach, Moeller was named interim head coach and led the Wolverines to a 28–24 win over Alabama.

==== Head coach ====
After three seasons as offensive coordinator, Moeller was named Schembechler's successor as Michigan head coach in 1990. In his first season as head, Moeller helped the team compile a 8–3 regular season record to win the conference title. The Wolverines were invited to the Gator Bowl, where they won 35–3 over the Ole Miss Rebels. Michigan improved to 10–2 in 1991 and repeated as conference champions, but lost 14–34 in the Rose Bowl to Washington. That year, he helped Desmond Howard win the Heisman Trophy and Erick Anderson win the Dick Butkus Award. In 1992, Moeller led the Wolverines to an undefeated 9–0–3 record, a conference championship, and a Rose Bowl win over Washington 38–31, finishing fifth in the national rankings. Michigan compiled an 8–4 record in 1993, placing 21st in the national rankings, and another 8–4 record in 1994.

Moeller resigned in May 1995 after tapes were released of his alleged drunken outburst following an arrest on a charge of disorderly conduct at the now-defunct Excalibur restaurant in Southfield, Michigan, on April 28. It subsequently emerged that he had been fired, but was allowed to save face publicly by resigning. He was succeeded by Lloyd Carr, who had assisted him at both Illinois and Michigan. Both Moeller and Carr served under Schembechler from 1980 to 1989.

== NFL ==
After Michigan, Moeller was hired in June 1995 by the Cincinnati Bengals as tight ends coach under head coach David Shula and spent two seasons there. In 1997, he joined the Detroit Lions as the assistant head coach and linebackers coach under new head coach Bobby Ross.

=== Lions head coach ===
In 2000, Moeller was named head coach following Ross's sudden resignation nine games into the season. He was given a contract for the remainder of the season and two additional years by owner William Clay Ford Sr., a move that seemingly guaranteed a future with the team. After the team narrowly missed the playoffs (losing their final game on a last-second 54-yard field goal), ownership endorsed Moeller as the Lions head coach for the foreseeable future. However, he was eventually fired by new team president Matt Millen in early 2001 and replaced by Marty Mornhinweg. Moeller finished with a 4–3 record as head coach, making him the only Lions head coach since Joe Schmidt to post a winning record during his tenure (Moeller has since been joined by Jim Caldwell and Dan Campbell in this regard).

=== After Detroit ===
In 2001, Moeller joined the Jacksonville Jaguars as defensive coordinator under head coach Tom Coughlin. He voluntarily stepped down from that position after one season, signing a three-year contract with the Chicago Bears as linebackers coach under head coach Dick Jauron. He served in that role for two seasons, leaving when Jauron was fired after the 2003 season. He did not coach again after that.

== Death ==
Moeller died on July 11, 2022, at the age of 81.

== Head coaching record ==
=== College ===
Year	Team	Overall	Conference	Standing	Bowl/playoffs	Coaches^{#}	AP^{°}
Illinois Fighting Illini (Big Ten Conference) (1977–1979)
1977	Illinois	3–8	2–6	9th			
1978	Illinois	1–8–2	0–6–2	9th			
1979	Illinois	2–8–1	1–6–1	9th			
Illinois:		6–24–3	3–18–3				
Michigan Wolverines (Big Ten Conference) (1990–1994)
1990	Michigan	9–3	6–2	T–1st	W Gator	8	7
1991	Michigan	10–2	8–0	1st	L Rose	6	6
1992	Michigan	9–0–3	6–0–2	1st	W Rose	5	5
1993	Michigan	8–4	5–3	T–4th	W Hall of Fame	19	21
1994	Michigan	8–4	5–3	3rd	W Holiday	12	12
Michigan:		44–13–3	30–8–2				
Total:		50–37–6					
National championship Conference title Conference division title or championship game berth
^{#}Rankings from final Coaches Poll.; ^{°}Rankings from final AP Poll.

=== NFL ===
Team	Year	Regular season					Postseason			
Team	Year	Won	Lost	Ties	Win %	Finish	Won	Lost	Win %	Result
DET	2000	4	3	0	.571	4th in NFC Central	0	0	.000	
DET Total		4	3	0	.571		0	0	.000	–
Total		4	3	0	.571		0	0	.000	–
