= Lance Brown =

American football player (born 1972)

No. 21, 29, 31
- Position: Defensive back

Personal information
- Born: February 2, 1972 (age 54); Jacksonville, Florida, U.S.
- Listed height: 6 ft 2 in (1.88 m)
- Listed weight: 200 lb (91 kg)

Career information
- High school: Terry Parker (Jacksonville)
- College: Indiana
- NFL draft: 1995: 5th round, 161st overall pick

Career history
- Pittsburgh Steelers (1995)*; Arizona Cardinals (1995–1996); New York Jets (1996); Pittsburgh Steelers (1998–1999); Buffalo Bills (2001)
- * Offseason or practice squad member only

Career NFL statistics
- Games played: 58
- Games started: 6
- Sacks: 1
- Stats at Pro Football Reference

Lance Allen Brown (born February 2, 1972) is an American former professional football player who was a defensive back in the National Football League (NFL). He played five seasons for the Arizona Cardinals (1995–1996), Pittsburgh Steelers (1998–1999), and Buffalo Bills (2001). He played college football for the Indiana Hoosiers and was selected by the Steelers in the fifth round of the 1995 NFL draft with the 161st overall pick.
