= Travis Sims =

American football fullback (born 1971)

Profile
- Position: Fullback

Personal information
- Born: c. 1971; Federal Way, Washington, U.S.
- Listed height: 5 ft 10 in (1.78 m)
- Listed weight: 219 lb (99 kg)

Career information
- High school: Federal Way (WA)
- College: Hawaii (1989–1992)

Travis Sims (born c. 1971) is a former American football fullback. He played college football for the Hawaii Rainbow Warriors from 1989 to 1992. As a senior in 1992, he ranked third nationally with 1,498 rushing yards. In four years at Hawaii, he tallied 2,311 rushing yards, 98 receiving yards, and 14 touchdowns.

His son, Landon, also played football for Hawaii starting in 2024.

== See also ==
- Hawaii Rainbow Warriors football statistical leaders
