= 1992 Illinois Fighting Illini football team =

American college football season

1992 Illinois Fighting Illini football

Holiday Bowl, L 17–27 Hawaii
- Conference: Big Ten Conference
- Record: 6–5–1 (4–3–1 Big Ten)
- Head coach: Lou Tepper (1st season)
- Offensive coordinator: Tom Beck (1st season)
- Defensive coordinator: Denny Marcin (1st season)
- MVP: Jason Verduzco
- Captains: Brad Hopkins; John Wright Jr.
- Home stadium: Memorial Stadium

1992 Big Ten Conference football standings
	Conf.					Overall
Team	W		L		T	W		L		T
No. 5 Michigan $	6	–	0	–	2	9	–	0	–	3
No. 18 Ohio State	5	–	2	–	1	8	–	3	–	1
Michigan State	5	–	3	–	0	5	–	6	–	0
Illinois	4	–	3	–	1	6	–	5	–	1
Iowa	4	–	4	–	0	5	–	7	–	0
Indiana	3	–	5	–	0	5	–	6	–	0
Wisconsin	3	–	5	–	0	5	–	6	–	0
Purdue	3	–	5	–	0	4	–	7	–	0
Northwestern	3	–	5	–	0	3	–	8	–	0
Minnesota	2	–	6	–	0	2	–	9	–	0
$ – Conference champion; Rankings from AP Poll

The 1992 Illinois Fighting Illini football team was an American football team that represented the University of Illinois at Urbana-Champaign as a member of the Big Ten Conference during the 1992 NCAA Division I-A football season. In their first year under head coach Lou Tepper, the Illini compiled a 6–5–1 record (4–3–1 in conference games), finished in fourth place in the Big Ten Conference, and outscored opponents by a total of 211 to 208. They concluded the season with a loss to Hawaii in the 1992 Holiday Bowl.

The team's statistical leaders included quarterback Jason Verduzco (1,531 passing yards, 63.7% completion percentage), running back Darren Boyer (554 rushing yards), wide receiver John Wright (40 receptions for 426 yards), and kicker Chris Richardson (58 points, 20 of 23 extra points, 11 of 16 field goals).

Several Illinois players received all-conference honors. Defensive lineman Simeon Rice was selected by the Associated Press (AP) as the Big Ten Freshman of the Year. Offensive tackle Brad Hopkins was selected by the AP as a first-team all-conference player, and linebacker Dana Howard and quarterback Verduzco were selected as a second-team player.

The team played its home games at Memorial Stadium in Champaign, Illinois.

== Schedule ==
Date	Opponent	Site	Result	Attendance	Source
September 5	Northern Illinois*	Memorial Stadium; Champaign, IL	W 30–14	50,015	
September 12	Missouri*	Memorial Stadium; Champaign, IL (rivalry)	W 24–17	53,568	
September 19	at Houston*	Houston Astrodome; Houston, TX	L 13–31	25,931	
October 3	at Minnesota	Hubert H. Humphrey Metrodome; Minneapolis, MN	L 17–18	32,112	
October 10	at No. 21 Ohio State	Ohio Stadium; Columbus, OH (Illibuck)	W 18–16	93,982	
October 17	Iowa	Memorial Stadium; Champaign, IL	L 14–24	70,314	
October 24	Northwestern	Memorial Stadium; Champaign, IL (rivalry)	L 26–27	52,332	
October 31	at Wisconsin	Camp Randall Stadium; Madison, WI	W 13–12	65,293	
November 7	Purdue	Memorial Stadium; Champaign, IL (rivalry)	W 20–17	55,339	
November 14	at No. 3 Michigan	Michigan Stadium; Ann Arbor, MI (rivalry)	T 22–22	106,481	
November 21	Michigan State	Memorial Stadium; Champaign, IL	W 14–10	40,552	
December 30	vs. Hawaii*	Jack Murphy Stadium; San Diego, CA (Holiday Bowl)	L 17–27	44,457	
*Non-conference game; Rankings from AP Poll released prior to the game

== Roster ==
1992 Illinois Fighting Illini football team roster
Players
Coaches
Offense

Pos.	#	Name	Class
TE	87	Ken Dilger	So
C	56	Greg Engel	Jr
OT	79	Brad Hopkins	Sr
QB	13	Johnny Johnson	Fr
QB	17	Jeff Schwarzentraub	Jr

Defense

Pos.	#	Name	Class
LB	51	Kevin Hardy	Fr
LB	52	John Holecek	So
LB	50	Dana Howard	So
DE	97	Simeon Rice	Fr
CB	29	Scott Turner	So

Special teams

Pos.	#	Name	Class
K	13	Eric Barofsky	So

Head coach

- Lou Tepper

Coordinators/assistant coaches

Legend

- (C) Team captain
- (S) Suspended
- (I) Ineligible
- Injured
- Redshirt

Roster

== Team players in the NFL ==
Player	Position	Round	Pick	NFL club
Brad Hopkins	Tackle	1	13	Houston Oilers
