= Chuck Belin =

American football player (born 1970)

No. 71
- Position: Guard

Personal information
- Born: October 27, 1970 (age 56); Milwaukee, Wisconsin, U.S.
- Listed height: 6 ft 2 in (1.88 m)
- Listed weight: 305 lb (138 kg)

Career information
- High school: Harold S. Vincent (Milwaukee)
- College: Wisconsin
- NFL draft: 1993: 5th round, 127th overall pick

Career history
- Los Angeles/St. Louis Rams (1993–1996); New Orleans Saints (1997)*; Amsterdam Admirals (1998)
- * Offseason or practice squad member only

Awards and highlights
- First-team All-Big Ten (1992); Second-team All-Big Ten (1991)

Career NFL statistics
- Games played: 21
- Games started: 6
- Fumble recoveries: 1
- Stats at Pro Football Reference

Charles Edward Belin (born October 27, 1970) is an American former professional football player who was a guard in the National Football League (NFL). Belin played college football for the Wisconsin Badgers. He was selected by the Los Angeles Rams in the fifth round of the 1993 NFL draft and was a member of the team that season, but did not see any playing time during a regular season game. He played with the team for three more seasons. During that time the team moved from Los Angeles to St. Louis, Missouri.
