= Jermaine Ross =

American football player (born 1971)

No. 82
- Position: Wide receiver

Personal information
- Born: April 27, 1971 (age 55); Jeffersonville, Indiana, U.S.
- Listed height: 6 ft 0 in (1.83 m)
- Listed weight: 192 lb (87 kg)

Career information
- High school: Jeffersonville
- College: Purdue
- NFL draft: 1994: undrafted

Career history
- Los Angeles / St. Louis Rams (1994–1997); Jacksonville Jaguars (1998); Cleveland Browns (1999)*
- * Offseason or practice squad member only

Career NFL statistics
- Games played: 23
- Receptions: 19
- Receiving Yards: 233
- Total Touchdowns: 2
- Stats at Pro Football Reference

Jermaine Lewis Ross (born April 27, 1971) is an American former professional football player who was a wide receiver in the National Football League (NFL). A graduate of Jeffersonville High School, he played college football for the Purdue Boilermakers before going into the NFL.

== Professional career ==
Jermaine entered the NFL in 1994 with the Los Angeles Rams before the team moved to St. Louis in 1995. After the 1998 season with the Jaguars he became inactive as a football player after five seasons in the NFL.
