= Marquel Fleetwood =

American gridiron football player (born 1970)

No. 14, 10
- Position: Quarterback

Personal information
- Born: January 23, 1970 (age 56); Atlanta, Georgia, U.S.
- Listed height: 6 ft 1 in (1.85 m)
- Listed weight: 200 lb (91 kg)

Career information
- College: Minnesota (1989–1992)
- NFL draft: 1993: undrafted

Career history
- Ottawa Rough Riders (1993–1994); Frankfurt Galaxy (1996); Toronto Argonauts (1996); BC Lions (1997)*; Hamilton Tiger-Cats (1997)
- * Offseason or practice squad member only

Awards and highlights
- Grey Cup champion (1996)

Marquel Fleetwood (born January 23, 1970) is an American former professional football quarterback who played four seasons in the Canadian Football League (CFL) with the Ottawa Rough Riders, Toronto Argonauts, and Hamilton Tiger-Cats. He played college football at the University of Minnesota.

== Early life ==
Marquel Fleetwood was born on January 23, 1970, in Atlanta, Georgia. He played college football for the Minnesota Golden Gophers of the University of Minnesota, and was a four-year letterman from 1989 to 1992. As the backup to Scott Schaffner in 1989, Fleetwood completed 23 of 56 passes (41.1%) for 270 yards, no touchdowns, and six interceptions while also scoring three rushing touchdowns. After Schaffner was benched during the 1990 season opener, Fleetwood took over as the starter. Overall in 1990, he completed 95 of 171 passes (55.6%) for 1,199 yards, six touchdowns, and seven interceptions while also rushing for 268 yards and five touchdowns. Fleetwood missed part of the 1990 season due to injury. In 1991, Fleetwood totaled 143 completions on 276 passing attempts (51.8%) for 1,642 yards, five touchdowns, and ten interceptions, and two rushing touchdowns. As a senior during the 1992 season, he completed 192 of 385 passes (49.9%) for 2,168 yards, seven touchdowns, and 18 interceptions while rushing for 319 yards and five touchdowns. His completions, pass attempts, passing yards and interceptions were all the most in the Big Ten Conference in 1992. Fleetwood also had a Big Ten-leading 197.1 passing yards per game.

== Professional career ==
Fleetwood signed with the Ottawa Rough Riders of the Canadian Football League (CFL) in April 1993, spending two seasons as a backup quarterback with the Rough Riders. He dressed in 14 games during his rookie year in 1993, completing two of five passes for seven yards and one interception. He dressed in all 18 games, starting two, during the 1994 season. He recorded 29 completions on 63 passing attempts (46.0%) for 386 yards, two touchdowns, and two interceptions, while also rushing for 168 yards and one touchdown. Fleetwood was released in May 1995.

Fleetwood was a member of the Frankfurt Galaxy of the World League of American Football (WLAF) during the 1996 WLAF season but did not record any statistics.

Fleetwood then signed with the Toronto Argonauts of the CFL in May 1996. He dressed in all 18 games for Toronto during the 1996 season, completing five of ten passes for 16 yards and three interceptions while rushing for 83 yards and a touchdown. On November 24, 1996, the Argonauts won the 84th Grey Cup against the Edmonton Eskimos by a score of 43–37. Fleetwood was released in May 1997.

Fleetwood signed with the CFL's BC Lions in June 1997. He retired before the start of the season.

Fleetwood came out of retirement to sign with the Hamilton Tiger-Cats of the CFL on October 10, 1997. He dressed in three games, starting one, in 1997, completing 22 of 47 passes (46.8%) for 216 yards and one interception while also rushing for 96 yards and one touchdown. Fleetwood retired from the CFL for the final time on March 26, 1998.
