= 1993 Rose Bowl =

American college football game

- 79th Rose Bowl Game
Michigan Wolverines	Washington Huskies
(8–0–3)	(9–2)
38	31
Head coach: Gary Moeller	Head coach: Don James
AP / Coaches / BC; 7 / 7 / 6	AP / Coaches / BC; 9 / 11 / 11
	1	2	3	4	Total
Michigan	10	7	14	7	38
Washington	7	14	10	0	31
- Date: January 1, 1993
- Season: 1992
- Stadium: Rose Bowl
- Location: Pasadena, California
- Player of the Game: Tyrone Wheatley (Michigan RB)
- Favorite: Washington by 2 points
- Referee: Gene Wurtz (WAC)
- Attendance: 94,236

United States TV coverage
- Network: ABC
- Announcers: Brent Musburger (Play By Play); Dick Vermeil (Color); Julie Moran (Sideline)

The 1993 Rose Bowl was a college football bowl game played on January 1, 1993, at the Rose Bowl in Pasadena, California. In the 79th Rose Bowl; the #7 Michigan Wolverines, champions of the Big Ten, defeated the ninth-ranked Washington Huskies, champions of the Pac-10, 38–31. Michigan running back Tyrone Wheatley was named the Rose Bowl Player of the Game.

== Game summary ==
The game, one of the great contests in Rose Bowl history, was back and forth, with six lead changes. Michigan scored the final two touchdowns to win by seven points, avenging the previous year's loss and foiling the Huskies' attempt at a third straight Rose Bowl title. MVP Tyrone Wheatley scored three touchdowns and rushed for 235 yards on just 15 carries (15.7 avg.)

Michigan finished the season undefeated (with three ties) at 9–0–3, ranked #5 in the final polls. Washington (9–3) was ranked #1 in early November at 8-0, but losses to Arizona and Washington State, along with this one, dropped them to #11 (AP) and #10 (Coaches) in the final national rankings.

This turned out to be Don James' last game as the Huskies' head coach. He resigned in protest shortly before the beginning of the next season after the NCAA and Pac-10 levied sanctions against Washington for rules violations.

== Scoring ==
=== First quarter ===
- Mich. - Peter Elezovic, 41-yard field goal - 7:11 - Mich. 3–0
- Wash. - Darius Turner, 1-yard run (Travis Hanson kick) - 3:58 - Wash. 7–3
- Mich. - Tony McGee, 49-yard pass from Elvis Grbac (Elezovic kick) - 2:07 - Mich. 10–7

=== Second quarter ===
- Mich. - Tyrone Wheatley, 56-yard run (Elezovic kick) - 11:12 - Mich. 17–7
- Wash. - Jason Shelley, 64-yard pass from Mark Brunell (Hanson kick) - 9:20 - Mich. 17–14
- Wash. - Mark Bruener, 18-yard pass from Brunell (Hanson kick) - 3:14 - Wash. 21–17

=== Third quarter ===
- Mich. - Wheatley, 88-yard run (Elezovic kick) - 14:44 - Mich. 24–21
- Wash. - Napoleon Kaufman, 1-yard run (Hanson kick) - 12:12 - Wash. 28–24
- Wash. - Hanson, 44-yard field goal - 8:42 - Wash. 31–24
- Mich. - Wheatley, 24-yard run (Elezovic kick) - 1:48 - tied 31–31

=== Fourth quarter ===
- Mich. - McGee, 15-yard pass from Grbac (Elezovic kick) - 5:29 - Mich. 38–31
