= Herb Deromedi =

American football coach and college athletics administrator

Biographical details
- Born: May 26, 1939 (age 87); Detroit, Michigan, U.S.
- Education: Michigan

Coaching career (HC unless noted)
- 1961–1962: Byron HS (MI)
- 1962–1963: Ann Arbor University HS (MI)
- 1964–1967: Royal Oak Kimball HS (MI) (assistant)
- 1967–1968: Central Michigan (OL)
- 1969–1977: Central Michigan (DC)
- 1978–1993: Central Michigan

Administrative career (AD unless noted)
- 1994–2006: Central Michigan

Head coaching record
- Overall: 110–55–10
- Bowls: 0–1

Accomplishments and honors

Championships
- 3 MAC (1979–1980, 1990)

Awards
- 2× MAC Coach of the Year (1980, 1990)
- College Football Hall of Fame; Inducted in 2007 (profile)

Herb Deromedi (born May 26, 1939) is a retired American football coach and college athletics administrator. He served as the head football coach at Central Michigan University from 1978 to 1993, compiling a record of 110–55–10. His 110 wins remain the most for a Central Michigan coach and stood as a record within the Mid-American Conference until 2019 when Frank Solich of Ohio University surpassed it. Following his coaching career, Deromedi served as athletic director at Central Michigan from 1994 to 2006.

== Early life ==
Deromedi attended Royal Oak High School in Royal Oak, Michigan, where he played fullback on the football team. He attended the University of Michigan but did not play football. According to Deromedi, he "wasn't big enough...when I got to the right weight, I was too slow for the position." He earned a bachelor's degree from Michigan in 1960 and a master's degree in 1961.

While still a graduate student at Michigan, Deromedi found work as an assistant coach at University High School, under head coach Jack Stovall. After graduating, he was hired at Byron High School in nearby Byron, Michigan, to coach baseball, basketball, and football. His work as the basketball coach garnered him coach of the year from the Motor Valley Conference. After the 1961–1962 season, he returned to University High School for two years as the head football coach. He then moved on to Royal Oak Kimball High School in his native Royal Oak, where he spent three years coaching baseball, basketball, and football; the latter as an assistant under Prentice "Pin" Ryan and Paul Temerian.

== College coach ==
Deromedi had first met Roy Kramer in the early 1960s at a state coaching convention, during Deromedi's stint as head football coach at University High School. Kramer was the head football coach at East Lansing High School. The two men became friends, and when Kramer became the head coach at Central Michigan University in 1967, he hired Deromedi to coach the offensive line. Kramer promoted Deromedi to defensive coordinator, replacing Bill Odykirk, who moved over to offensive coordinator. For the next nine seasons, Deromedi coached the defense under Kramer. In 1974, Central Michigan won the NCAA Division II Football Championship. CMU transitioned to NCAA Division I and the Mid-American Conference the following year and continued to find success; the defense was ranked in the top ten three times between 1974 and 1977.

Kramer departed CMU in mid-1978 to become the athletic director at Vanderbilt University, starting a career in athletic administration that ended as commissioner of the Southeastern Conference (SEC) between 1990–2002. Deromedi succeeded him and retained most of the staff, beginning a 16-year tenure as head coach. Under Deromedi, CMU won the MAC three times: in 1979, 1980, and 1990. He was named MAC Coach of the Year for the 1980 and 1990 seasons. In 1990 CMU posted a 8–3–1 record, won the conference, and received an invitation to the California Bowl. Although CMU lost to San Jose State 48–28, it was CMU's first postseason appearance since moving up to Division I.

Another highlight was back-to-back victories over the Michigan State Spartans of the Big Ten Conference in 1991 and 1992. The 1991 victory was a stunning upset: Michigan State had shared the Big Ten championship the previous year and was ranked No. 18 in the AP Poll entering the game. According to the New York Times, "oddsmakers did not release point spreads on the game because they thought Michigan State would win in a rout." CMU never trailed and won the game 20–3. The two teams met again in 1992 and CMU again defeated Michigan State, 24–20. Despite the victory over Michigan State, the 1992 season was otherwise undistinguished, with CMU finishing 7th in the MAC. After a 4th-place finish in 1993, Deromedi gave way to long-time defensive coordinator Dick Flynn and succeeded Dave Keilitz as athletic director. Deromedi's 110 wins stood as record within the MAC until Ohio University surpassed it in 2019.

Deromedi spent eleven years as athletic director. He retired in 2006 and was succeeded by Dave Heeke. He served a three-year term on the College Football Playoff Selection Committee from 2016–2019.

== Honors ==
Deromedi has been inducted into the Royal Oak High School Hall of Fame (1996), the Central Michigan University Athletic Hall of Fame, the Michigan Sports Hall of Fame (2004), the College Football Hall of Fame (2007), the Mid-American Conference Hall of Fame (2012),

== Head coaching record ==
Year	Team	Overall	Conference	Standing	Bowl/playoffs
Central Michigan Chippewas (Mid-American Conference) (1978–1993)
1978	Central Michigan	9–2	8–1	2nd	
1979	Central Michigan	10–0–1	8–0–1	1st	
1980	Central Michigan	9–2	7–2	1st	
1981	Central Michigan	7–4	7–2	3rd	
1982	Central Michigan	6–4–1	5–3–1	4th	
1983	Central Michigan	8–3	7–2	T–2nd	
1984	Central Michigan	8–2–1	6–2–1	3rd	
1985	Central Michigan	7–3	6–3	3rd	
1986	Central Michigan	5–5	4–4	T–5th	
1987	Central Michigan	5–5–1	3–4–1	6th	
1988	Central Michigan	7–4	5–3	T–2nd	
1989	Central Michigan	5–5–1	5–2–1	4th	
1990	Central Michigan	8–3–1	7–1	T–1st	L California
1991	Central Michigan	6–1–4	3–1–4	2nd	
1992	Central Michigan	5–6	4–5	7th	
1993	Central Michigan	5–6	5–4	4th	
Central Michigan:		110–55–10	90–39–9		
Total:		110–55–10			
National championship Conference title Conference division title or championship game berth
