= 1990 Toledo Rockets football team =

American college football season

1990 Toledo Rockets football

MAC co–champion
- Conference: Mid-American Conference
- Record: 9–2 (7–1 MAC)
- Head coach: Nick Saban (1st season)
- Offensive coordinator: Greg Meyer (1st season)
- Defensive coordinator: Dean Pees (1st season)
- MVP: Jerry Evans
- Captains: Marcus Amick; Rick Isaiah; Pat Johnson; Dwayne Smith
- Home stadium: Glass Bowl

1990 Mid-American Conference football standings
	Conf.					Overall
Team	W		L		T	W		L		T
Toledo +	7	–	1	–	0	9	–	2	–	0
Central Michigan +	7	–	1	–	0	8	–	3	–	1
Ball State	5	–	3	–	0	7	–	4	–	0
Western Michigan	5	–	3	–	0	7	–	4	–	0
Miami (OH)	4	–	3	–	1	5	–	5	–	1
Bowling Green	2	–	4	–	2	3	–	5	–	2
Eastern Michigan	2	–	6	–	0	2	–	9	–	0
Kent State	2	–	6	–	0	2	–	9	–	0
Ohio	0	–	7	–	1	1	–	9	–	1
+ – Conference co-champions

The 1990 Toledo Rockets football team was an American football team that represented the University of Toledo as a member of the Mid-American Conference (MAC) during the 1990 NCAA Division I-A football season. In their first and only season under head coach Nick Saban, the team compiled a 9–2 record (7–1 in MAC games), outscored opponents by a total of 284 to 178, and tied with Central Michigan for the MAC championship. The team opened the season with six consecutive victories but lost by a 13–12 score to Central Michigan and by a 14–10 score to Navy.

The team's statistical leaders included: quarterback Kevin Meger with 1,861 passing yards; running back Troy Parker with 879 rushing yards; wide receiver Rick Isaiah with 49 receptions for 717 yards; kicker Rusty Hanna with 82 points scored; and linebacker Matt Eberflus with 89 total tackles . Tight end Jerry Evans won the team's award as the outstanding varsity football player. Four Toledo players won first-team honors on the 1990 All-MAC football team: Isaiah at wide receiver; Eberflus at linebacker; Evans at tight end; and Craig Kuligowski at offensive tackle.

The team played its home games at the Glass Bowl in Toledo, Ohio. The Glass Bowl was renovated prior to the 1990 season at a cost of $18.5 million to include a skybox with 42 luxury suites.

== Schedule ==
Date	Time	Opponent	Site	Result	Attendance	Source
September 8	1:30 p.m.	at Miami (OH)	Yager Stadium; Oxford, OH	W 20–14	19,000	
September 15	7:30 p.m.	Northern Illinois*	Glass Bowl; Toledo, OH	W 23–14	21,154	
September 22	2:30 p.m.	at Ball State	Ball State Stadium; Muncie, IN	W 28–16	13,321	
September 29	1:30 p.m.	at Ohio	Peden Stadium; Athens, OH	W 27–20	15,828	
October 6	1:00 p.m.	Eastern Michigan	Glass Bowl; Toledo, OH	W 37–23	25,079	
October 13	7:30 p.m.	Bowling Green	Glass Bowl; Toledo, OH (rivalry)	W 19–13	29,761	
October 20	1:00 p.m.	at Central Michigan	Kelly/Shorts Stadium; Mount Pleasant, MI	L 12–13	20,781	
October 27	4:30 p.m.	Kent State	Glass Bowl; Toledo, OH	W 28–14	21,670	
November 3	1:00 p.m.	at Western Michigan	Waldo Stadium; Kalamazoo, MI	W 37–9	17,131	
November 10	4:30 p.m.	Navy*	Glass Bowl; Toledo, OH	L 10–14	23,958	
November 17	4:30 p.m.	Arkansas State*	Glass Bowl; Toledo, OH	W 43–28	15,306	
*Non-conference game; All times are in Eastern time; Source:

== Hiring of Nick Saban ==
At the end of the 1989 season, with the team compiling a 6–5 record, Toledo athletic director Al Bohl fired head coach Dan Simrell. By mid-December, the finalists were narrowed to Pete Cordelli (then the quarterbacks coach at Notre Dame) and Nick Saban (then the secondary coach for the Houston Oilers). On December 22, 1989, Bohl announced that Saban had been hired as the program's new head coach. The position was Saban's first as a head coach.

== Game summaries ==
=== Miami (OH) ===
Team	1	2	3	4	Total
• Toledo	14	6	0	0	20
Miami	7	0	0	7	14

- Location: Yager Stadium
  Oxford, Ohio
- Game attendance: 19,000

To open the 1990 season, Toledo traveled to Oxford to play the Miami Redskins. In what was both the head coaching debut for Saban and the Redskins' Randy Walker, the Rockets won, 20–14. Toledo scored first on a one-yard Troy Parker run early in the first quarter for a 7–0 lead. However, Miami responded on the kickoff that followed when Milt Stegall returned it 92-yards for the score to tie the game at 7–7. Later in the first, Jeff Lamb recovered a Jim Clement fumble at the Redskins 12-yard line. Three plays later, Parker scored his second one-yard touchdown to give Toledo a 14–7 lead. Early in the second quarter, Dave Walkosky intercepted a Clement pass to give the Rockets possession at their 33-yard line. Nine plays later, Parker scored his third touchdown of the afternoon, this time from two-yards out. Rusty Hanna then had his extra point attempt blocked and Toledo led 20–7 at halftime.

In the third quarter, a snap went over the head of punter Brian Borders to give Miami possession at the Toledo 21-yard line. However, a goal line stand by the Rockets' defense kept the Redskins out of the endzone on a failed fourth-and-one running play. In the fourth quarter, Miami scored the final points of the game on a five-yard Terry Carter touchdown run to make the final score 20–14. The victory improved Toledo's all-time record against Miami to 16–22.

=== Northern Illinois ===
Team	1	2	3	4	Total
Northern Illinois	7	7	0	0	14
• Toledo	7	3	6	7	23

- Location: Glass Bowl
  Toledo, Ohio
- Game attendance: 21,154

In their first home game of the 1990 season, Toledo defeated the Northern Illinois Huskies, 23–14, in what was the first game played since the completion of an $18 million ($44.4 million in 2025 dollars) renovation at the Glass Bowl. Toledo scored first on an eight-yard run by Troy Parker to take an early 7–0 lead. The Huskies responded with a 15-yard run by Stacey Robinson to tie the game at 7–7 at the end of the first quarter. In the second quarter, Rusty Hanna then retook the lead for Toledo with his 23-yard field goal before Northern Illinois responded with a 12-yard Robinson touchdown pass to Ray Patterson for a 14–10 halftime lead for the Huskies.

In the third quarter, the Rockets retook the lead after Kevin Meger scored on a 26-yard run, and after a failed extra point attempt Toledo led, 16–14. Parker then scored the final points of the game in the fourth with his two-yard touchdown run for the 23–14 win. Parker set a new school record with his 40 running attempts and rushed for 205 yards on the afternoon. For his performance, Parker was named the Mid-American Conference Offensive Player of the Week. The victory improved Toledo's all-time record against Northern Illinois to 16–6.

=== Ball State ===
Team	1	2	3	4	Total
• Toledo	0	7	7	14	28
Ball State	0	0	3	13	16

- Location: Scheumann Stadium
  Muncie, Indiana
- Game attendance: 13,321

In week three, Toledo defeated the Ball State Cardinals, 28–16, at Scheumann Stadium in Muncie. After a scoreless first quarter, Toledo took a 7–0 halftime lead after Kevin Meger scored on a two-yard run to complete a 75-yard drive. The Rockets then extended their lead to 14–0 early in the third quarter on a two-yard Troy Parker run before the Cardinals cut the lead to 14–3 on a 47-yard Kenny Stucker field goal late in the quarter.

In the fourth quarter, each team traded a pair of touchdowns with Toledo winning the game, 28–16. Toledo scored on touchdown runs of two-yards by Parker and ten-yards by Meger. Ball State scored touchdowns on a 19-yard Corey Croom run and on a 22-yard Scott Hammersley pass to Travis Moore. The victory improved Toledo's all-time record against Ball State to 8–8.

=== Ohio ===
Team	1	2	3	4	Total
• Toledo	0	13	7	7	27
Ohio	0	6	7	7	20

- Location: Peden Stadium
  Athens, Ohio
- Game attendance: 15,828

For the third time in as many road games the Rockets were victorious, and this time Toledo defeated the Ohio Bobcats, 27–20, at Peden Stadium in Athens. After a scoreless first quarter, each team connected on a field goal before Troy Parker scored the first touchdown of the game on an 11-yard run for a 10–3 Toledo lead. Each team again traded field goals later in the quarter to make the halftime score 13–6.

In the third quarter, Parker scored on a nine-yard run for Toledo and Ohio responded with a one-yard touchdown run for a 20–13 Rockets lead at the start of the fourth quarter. In the fourth, the Bobcats tied the game up at 20–20 when Anthony Thornton threw a 29-yard touchdown pass to Courtney Burton. Toledo then scored the game-winning touchdown with only 0:17 remaining in the game when Parker scored on a one-yard run to complete a 68-yard, 15 play drive. The victory improved Toledo's all-time record against Ohio to 21–19–1.

=== Eastern Michigan ===
Team	1	2	3	4	Total
Eastern Michigan	0	10	7	6	23
• Toledo	10	10	0	17	37

- Location: Glass Bowl
  Toledo, Ohio
- Game attendance: 25,079

With Troy Parker seeing limited action due to an injury, Neil Trotter rushed for 145 yards and Corey Ivey for 96 as Toledo defeated the Eastern Michigan Hurons, 37–23. The Rockets took a 10–0 lead in the first quarter on an eight-yard Ivey touchdown run and 37-yard Rusty Hanna field goal. In the second, both teams scored ten points to give Toledo a 20–10 halftime lead. The Hurons scored on an 85-yard Craig Thompson punt return and a 36-yard Jim Langeloh field goal; the Rockets scored on a 32-yard Hanna field goal and three-yard Kevin Meger touchdown run.

In the third, Eastern Michigan cut the lead to 20–17 after Cameron Moss scored on a 48-yard touchdown run. Toledo responded with 17 consecutive, fourth quarter points to win the game. After a 37-yard Hanna field goal, touchdowns were scored on a 28-yard Meger pass to Marcus Goodwin and on a four-yard Parker run. The Hurons scored again late in the game on an 11-yard Shane Jackson touchdown pass to Chris Nyenhuis to make the final score 37–23. The victory improved Toledo's all-time record against Eastern Michigan to 11–7.

=== Bowling Green ===
Team	1	2	3	4	Total
Bowling Green	7	6	0	0	13
• Toledo	3	0	6	10	19

- Location: Glass Bowl
  Toledo, Ohio
- Game attendance: 29,761

Before what was the second largest crowd to witness a game at the Glass Bowl, Toledo defeated the Bowling Green Falcons, 19–13, to win the Peace Pipe. After a Rusty Hanna field goal gave the Rockets an early 3–0 lead, a pair of Erik White touchdown passes gave the Falcons a 13–3 halftime lead. However, the Toledo defense shutout the Bowling Green offense in the second half, and the Rockets came back to win 19–13. Points were scored in the third on a seven-yard touchdown run by Kevin Meger and a one-yard Troy Parker touchdown run. Hanna added a field goal in the fourth. The victory improved Toledo's all-time record against Bowling Green to 22–29–4.

=== Central Michigan ===
Team	1	2	3	4	Total
Toledo	3	3	6	0	12
• Central Michigan	7	0	6	0	13

- Location: Kelly/Shorts Stadium
  Mount Pleasant, Michigan
- Game attendance: 20,781

In the hype that led to their game against the Central Michigan Chippewas, the press billed the contest as the de facto MAC championship game. At Mount Pleasant, the Rockets failed to score a touchdown and suffered their first loss of the season in a 13–12 loss. The Rockets scored first on a 28-yard Rusty Hanna field goal, but the Chippewas responded with a 53-yard Jeff Bender touchdown pass to Ken Ealy to take a 7–3 lead at the end of the first quarter. A 46-yard Hanna field goal in the second cut the Central lead to 7–6 at halftime.

In the third quarter, Toledo briefly retook the lead after Hanna connected on field goals of 41 and 26 yards. However, the Chippewas scored the game-winning touchdown later in the quarter when Bender threw a 38-yard touchdown pass to Bob Kench for the 13–12 victory. For his six-tackle performance, Mark Rhea was named the Mid-American Conference Defensive Player of the Week. The loss brought Toledo's all-time record against Central Michigan to 7–10–2.

=== Kent State ===
Team	1	2	3	4	Total
Kent State	7	7	0	0	14
• Toledo	7	3	3	15	28

- Location: Glass Bowl
  Toledo, Ohio
- Game attendance: 21,670

Against head coach Nick Saban's alma mater, the Rockets defeated the Kent State Golden Flashes, 28–14, one week after their first loss of the season. Toledo scored first on a one-yard Troy Parker touchdown run for a 7–0 lead. The Flashes responded with a 14-yard Joe Dalpra touchdown pass to tie the game at 7–7 at the end of the first. After the Rockets regained the lead on a 35-yard Rusty Hanna field goal, Kent took a 14–10 halftime lead on a six-yard Dalpra touchdown run.

A second, 35-yard field goal cut the Kent State lead to 14–13, and a pair of fourth-quarter touchdowns sealed the victory for Toledo. Touchdowns were scored by Neil Trotter on a 38-yard run and on a three-yard pass from Kevin Meger to Dan Grossman for the 28–14 win. The victory improved Toledo's all-time record against Kent State to 18–19.

=== Western Michigan ===
Team	1	2	3	4	Total
• Toledo	7	0	21	9	37
Western Michigan	6	0	3	0	9

- Location: Waldo Stadium
  Kalamazoo, Michigan
- Game attendance: 17,131

In their final conference game of the season, Toledo defeated the Western Michigan Broncos, 37–9, to secure the conference co-championship with Central Michigan. Toledo led, 7–6, at halftime after Kevin Meger threw a 33-yard touchdown pass to Rickey Isaiah for the Rockets, and Dan Boggan scored for the Broncos on a one-yard touchdown run.

Toledo then scored three third-quarter touchdowns to take a 28–6 lead. Touchdowns were scored on a three-yard Meger pass to Jerry Evans, a 14-yard Meger run, and on a 67-yard Meger pass to Romauldo Brown. The Broncos then scored their final points of the game on a 31-yard Jay Barresi field goal to make the score 28–9 at the start of the fourth quarter. In the fourth, Damon Nelson scored on a one-yard touchdown run and Western snapped a punt out of the end zone for a safety and a 37–9 Toledo win. The victory improved Toledo's all-time record against Western Michigan to 23–22.

=== Navy ===
Team	1	2	3	4	Total
• Navy	0	0	0	14	14
Toledo	3	0	7	0	10

- Location: Glass Bowl
  Toledo, Ohio
- Game attendance: 23,958

In what was the Rockets' first all-time meeting against Navy, 14 unanswered points in the fourth quarter gave the Midshipmen the 14–10 win at the Glass Bowl. Toledo led, 10–0, as they entered the fourth quarter with points scored on a 34-yard Hanna field goal in the first and on a six-yard David Andrews touchdown run in the third. Navy came back to win the game in the fourth on a pair of Jason Pace touchdowns. The first came on a nine-yard run and the second on a five-yard reception from Alton Grizzard. The loss effectively resulted in the Rockets failing to get a bowl bid as Central Michigan got the automatic MAC bid to the California Bowl due to having the tiebreaker over Toledo.

=== Arkansas State ===
Team	1	2	3	4	Total
Arkansas State	7	7	14	0	28
• Toledo	7	17	7	12	43

- Location: Glass Bowl
  Toledo, Ohio
- Game attendance: 15,306

In the final game of the season, Toledo defeated the Arkansas State Indians, 43–28, at the Glass Bowl. The Indians scored first on a 24-yard Troy Mabone touchdown run followed by a one-yard Neil Trotter touchdown run for a 7–7 tie at the end of the first. In the second quarter Trotter scored on a two-yard run and Mabone on a one-yard run before a 38-yard Kevin Meger touchdown pass to Rickey Isaiah and 33-yard Rusty Hanna field goal gave the Rockets a 24–14 halftime lead.

In the third, Aubrey Miller recovered a Toledo fumble in the endzone for a touchdown and cut the Rockets lead to 24–21. Each team then traded touchdowns with Toledo scoring on a 27-yard Pat Johnson run and Arkansas State on a one-yard Roy Johnson run to make the score 31–28 at the start of the fourth. In the fourth, Toledo scored 12 unanswered points for the win. Damon Nelson scored on a four-yard touchdown run and Hanna connected on field goals of 33 and 41 yards in the 43–28 win. The nine wins were the most won by a Toledo squad since the 1983 season.

== Saban resignation ==
In February 1991, Saban resigned as head coach after only one season to become Bill Belichick's defensive coordinator with the Cleveland Browns. As defensive coordinator for the New York Giants, Belichick had to postpone assembling his new coaching staff until after Super Bowl XXV. Therefore, Saban's resignation was not announced until well after the season had ended. Additionally, Saban wanted any potential move to occur after February 6, National Signing Day for recruits.

== Personnel ==
=== Players ===
The following players won varsity letters for their participation on the 1990 Toledo team:

- Marcus Amick, senior, 6'1", 275 pounds
- Darren Anderson, junior, 6'1", 179 pounds
- David Andrews, fullback, junior, 6'1", 218 pounds
- Steve Bailey, defensive line, senior, 6'2", 227 pounds
- Al Baker, defensive back, freshman, 6'0", 176 pounds
- Ryan Barry, tight end, sophomore, 6'4", 231 pounds
- Brian Borders, punter, sophomore, 6'2", 195 pounds
- Tony Borgerding, linebacker, junior, 6'0", 218 pounds
- Chris Boykin, sophomore, 6'1", 223 pounds
- Romauldo Brown, wide receiver, senior, 5'11", 189 pounds
- Tim Caffey, sophomore, 6'2", 174 pounds
- Joseph DiLauro, offensive lineman, junior, 6'5", 280 pounds
- Walter Duncan, senior, 5'10", 186 pounds
- Matt Eberflus, linebacker, junior, 6'0", 224 pounds
- Jerry Evans, tight end, senior, 6'4", 247 pounds
- John Formentin, linebacker, freshman, 6'5", 205 pounds
- Marcus Goodwin, wide receiver, sophomore, 5'7", 154 pounds
- Dan Gossman, tight end, junior, 6'1", 218 pounds
- Shannon Hamilton, linebacker, freshman, 6'1", 216 pounds
- Rusty Hanna, placekicker, sophomore, 5'8", 171 pounds
- Bill Hardy, offensive lineman, senior, 6'5", 262 pounds
- Rick Isaiah, wide receiver, senior, 6'0", 168 pounds
- Terry Jackson, freshman, 6'2", 253 pounds
- Pat Johnson, fullback, senior, 6'2", 211 pounds
- Jason Kelley, sophomore, 5'10", 181 pounds
- Craig Kuligowski, offensive lineman, senior, 6'4", 279 pounds
- Joe Lajewski, wide receiver, junior, 5'7", 158 pounds
- Jeff Lamb, linebacker, senior, 6'2", 221 pounds
- Loa Manu, offensive lineman, junior, 6'4", 313 pounds
- Andy McCollum, offensive lineman, sophomore, 6'4", 255 pounds
- Kevin Meger, quarterback, sophomore, 6'1", 180 pounds
- Ben Mitchell, offensive lineman, senior, 6'4", 295 pounds
- Darrell Mossburg, linebacker, sophomore, 6'3", 220 pounds
- Damon Nelson, running back, freshman, 5'8", 165 pounds
- Ted Newsome, offensive lineman, senior, 6'4", 257 pounds
- Troy Parker, running back, freshman, 5'11", 197 pounds
- Mark Rhea, defensive lineman, junior, 6'4", 227 pounds
- Chris Schlachter, sophomore, 6'2", 235 pounds
- Geoff Simrell, defensive back, sophomore, 6'1", 164 pounds
- Dwayne Smith, linebacker, senior, 6'0", 227 pounds
- Albert Thigpen, offensive lineman, junior, 6'2", 240 pounds
- Ben Tombaugh, fullback, junior, 6'1", 211 pounds
- Neil Trotter, running back, senior, 5'10", 200 pounds
- Nick Varajon, senior, 6'1", 249 pounds
- Dan Vargo, defensive back, senior, 6'0", 183 pounds
- David Walkosky, defensive back, senior, 5'11", 171 pounds
- Dan Williams, defensive lineman, sophomore, 6'4", 254 pounds
- Joe Windover, wide receiver, senior, 6'2", 200 pounds

=== Coaching staff ===
- Head coach - Nick Saban
- Offensive coordinator: Greg Meyer
- Defensive coordinator: Dean Pees
- Assistant coaches: Tom Amstutz (linebackers/placekicker), Lawrence Cole (running backs), Ron Curtis (assistant head coach, wide receivers, recruiting coordinator), Ken Heidelbert (tight ends, special teams), Ken Mannie (strength/conditioning), Phil Parker (defensive backs), Pat Perles (defensive line), Ellis Rainsberger (offensive line)

== Statistics ==
Passing

Quarterback Kevin Meger completed 139 of 257 passes (54.1%) for 1,861 yards, six touchdowns, 11 interceptions, and a 114.1 passer rating.

Rushing

Troy Parker led the team with 879 rushing yards and 13 touchdowns on 233 carries, an average of 3.9 yards per carry.

Neil Trotter followed with 810 rushing yards on 149 carries, an average of 5.4 yards per carry.

Kevin Meger ranked third with 326 yards on 106 carries, an average of 3.1 yards per carry.

Receiving

Wide receiver Rick Isaiah was the team's leading receiver with 49 receptions for 717 yards, an average of 14.6 yards per reception.

Tight end Jerry Evans was the team's second leading receiver with 38 receptions for 417 yards, an average of 11.0 yards per reception.

Wide receiver Romauldo Brown ranked third in receiving with 18 receptions for 285 yards, an average of 15.8 yards per catch.

Scoring

Kicker Rusty Hanna led the team in scoring with 82 points. He converted 28 of 30 extra point kicks and 18 of 29 field goals.

Running back Troy Parker ranked second in scoring with 78 points on 13 touchdowns.

Quarterback Kevin Meger ranked third in scoring with 36 points on six touchdowns.

Tackles

Linebacker Matt Eberflus was the team's leading tackler with 89 total tackles (44 solo, 45 assisted).

Defensive back David Walkosky led the team in solo tackles (48) and ranked second in total tackles (87).

Defensive end Dan Williams led the team with 10 sacks and ranked fourth with 74 total tackles.

== Awards and honors ==
Senior tight end Jerry Evans received the Jim Nicholson Awards as the team's outstanding varsity football player. Tailback Troy Parker received the Norm Cohen Award as the outstanding freshman player. Offensive tackle Craig Kuligowski received the team's senior scholar-athlete award.

The following Toledo players were recognized on the 1990 All-MAC football team:

- Rick Isaiah, wide receiver, first team
- Craig Kuligowski, offensive tackle, first team
- Jerry Evans, tight end, first team
- Matt Eberflus, outside linebacker, first team
- Ben Mitchell, offensive guard, second team
- Pat Johnson, fullback, second team
- Neil Trotter, tailback, second team
- Rusty Hannah, placekicker, second team
- Dan Williams, defensive end, second team
- Dan Vargo, safety, second team
- Kevin Meger, quarterback, honorable mention
- Brian Borders, punter, honorable mention
- Jeff Lamb, linebacker, honorable mention
- Andy McCollum, offensive guard, honorable mention

Four Toledo players received academic all-MAC honors: Tom Borgerding, Rusty Hanna, Terry Jackson, and Andy McCollum.

The team captains were Marcus Amick, Rick Isaiah, Pat Johnson, and Dwayne Smith.
