= Jan Quarless =

American football player and coach

Jan Quarless PhD
Biographical details
- Born: 1951 (age 74–75)

Playing career
- 1969-1972: Northern Michigan

Coaching career (HC unless noted)
- 1976–1982: Southern Illinois (DL/OL/OC
- 1983–1985: Bowling GreenDL/OL
- 1986–1987: Kansas (OL)
- 1988–1989: Northwestern OL/ST
- 1990–1991: New Mexico (OC)
- 1992: Eastern Michigan (OL)
- 1992: Eastern Michigan (interim HC)
- 1993–1994: Wake Forest (TE/ST)
- 1995–1996: Wake Forest (OC/OL)
- 1997–2000: Southern Illinois
- 2005: Rhein Fire (OL)

Head coaching record
- Overall: 15–36

Jan Quarless (born c. 1951) is an American former football player and coach. He served as the head football coach at Eastern Michigan University in 1992 and at Southern Illinois University Carbondale from 1997 to 2000, compiling a career college football record of 15–36. Quarless has been inducted into the Sports Hall of Fame at Northern Michigan University, the Upper Peninsula Sports Hall of Fame and the West Iron County Schools Wall of Fame. Quarless also holds a PhD from Southern Illinois University, a distinction and achievement accomplishment by only a few Division 1 Head Football Coaches.

== Playing career ==
Quarless was a four-year lettermen for Northern Michigan University in Marquette, Michigan from 1969 to 1972 seasons, playing three different positions. As selected by his teammates, named team captain his senior year.

== Coaching career ==
=== Eastern Michigan ===
Quarless became interim head football coach at Eastern Michigan University when Jim Harkema resigned after the first four games of the 1992 season. Quarless's team produced a record of 1–6. The lone victory was a 7–6 home game against Ohio.

=== Southern Illinois ===
Quarless was the 19th head football coach at the Southern Illinois University Carbondale, serving for four seasons, from 1997 to 2000, and compiling a record of 14–30.

=== Assistant coaching ===
Quarless had several tenures as an assistant coach for at several colleges, including Eastern Michigan, Bowling Green State University, the University of Kansas, and Wake Forest University.

== Head coaching record ==
Year	Team	Overall	Conference	Standing	Bowl/playoffs
Eastern Michigan Eagles (Mid-American Conference) (1992)
1992	Eastern Michigan	1–6	1–5	T–9th	
Eastern Michigan:		1–6	1–5		
Southern Illinois Salukis (Gateway Football Conference) (1997–2000)
1997	Southern Illinois	3–8	1–5	6th	
1998	Southern Illinois	3–8	1–5	7th	
1999	Southern Illinois	5–6	1–5	7th	
2000	Southern Illinois	3–8	2–4	T–5th	
Southern Illinois:		14–30	5–19		
Total:		15–36			

== Education ==
Jan Quarless received his PhD from Southern Illinois University, his M.S.E. in Social Work Administration from the University of Michigan, and his B.S. from Northern Michigan University.
