= 1992 Toledo Rockets football team =

American college football season

1992 Toledo Rockets football
- Conference: Mid-American Conference
- Record: 8–3 (5–3 MAC)
- Head coach: Gary Pinkel (2nd season)
- Offensive coordinator: Mike Dunbar (1st season)
- Offensive scheme: Pro-style
- Defensive coordinator: Dean Pees (3rd season)
- Base defense: 4–3
- Home stadium: Glass Bowl

1992 Mid-American Conference football standings
	Conf.					Overall
Team	W		L		T	W		L		T
Bowling Green $	8	–	0	–	0	10	–	2	–	0
Western Michigan	6	–	3	–	0	7	–	3	–	1
Toledo	5	–	3	–	0	8	–	3	–	0
Akron	5	–	3	–	0	7	–	3	–	1
Miami (OH)	5	–	3	–	0	6	–	4	–	1
Ball State	5	–	4	–	0	5	–	6	–	0
Central Michigan	4	–	5	–	0	5	–	6	–	0
Kent State	2	–	7	–	0	2	–	9	–	0
Eastern Michigan	1	–	7	–	0	1	–	10	–	0
Ohio	1	–	7	–	0	1	–	10	–	0
$ – Conference champion

The 1992 Toledo Rockets football team was an American football team that represented the University of Toledo in the Mid-American Conference (MAC) during the 1992 NCAA Division I-A football season. In their second season under head coach Gary Pinkel, the Rockets compiled an 8–3 record (5–3 against MAC opponents), finished in a tie for third place in the MAC, and outscored all opponents by a combined total of 269 to 153.

The team's statistical leaders included Kevin Meger with 1,727 passing yards, Casey McBeth with 1,037 rushing yards, and Marcus Goodwin with 738 receiving yards.

== Schedule ==
Date	Opponent	Site	Result	Attendance	Source
September 5	Arkansas State*	Glass Bowl; Toledo, OH	W 49–0	15,900	
September 12	at Akron	Rubber Bowl; Akron, OH	L 20–23	24,736	
September 19	at Purdue*	Ross–Ade Stadium; West Lafayette, IN	W 33–29	37,715	
September 26	at Central Michigan	Kelly/Shorts Stadium; Mount Pleasant, MI	L 9–28	21,113	
October 10	Western Michigan	Glass Bowl; Toledo, OH	W 21–12		
October 17	Bowling Green	Glass Bowl; Toledo, OH (rivalry)	L 9–10		
October 24	at Miami (OH)	Yager Stadium; Oxford, OH	W 20–17	13,242	
October 31	Kent State	Glass Bowl; Toledo, OH	W 32–17	19,959	
November 7	at Ball State	Ball State Stadium; Muncie, IN	W 10–9	5,218	
November 14	Eastern Michigan	Glass Bowl; Toledo, OH	W 41–0	14,749	
November 21	at Northern Illinois*	Huskie Stadium; DeKalb, IL	W 25–8	5,220	
*Non-conference game

== After the season ==
=== NFL draft ===
The following Rocket was selected in the 1993 NFL draft following the season.

Round	Pick	Player	Position	NFL club
1	11	Dan Williams	Defensive end	Denver Broncos
