= 1990 Western Michigan Broncos football team =

American college football season

1990 Western Michigan Broncos football
- Conference: Mid-American Conference
- Record: 7–4 (5–3 MAC)
- Head coach: Al Molde (4th season)
- Offensive coordinator: Rob Kuhlman
- Defensive coordinator: Larry Edlund
- MVP: Sean Mulhearn
- Home stadium: Waldo Stadium

1990 Mid-American Conference football standings
	Conf.					Overall
Team	W		L		T	W		L		T
Toledo +	7	–	1	–	0	9	–	2	–	0
Central Michigan +	7	–	1	–	0	8	–	3	–	1
Ball State	5	–	3	–	0	7	–	4	–	0
Western Michigan	5	–	3	–	0	7	–	4	–	0
Miami (OH)	4	–	3	–	1	5	–	5	–	1
Bowling Green	2	–	4	–	2	3	–	5	–	2
Eastern Michigan	2	–	6	–	0	2	–	9	–	0
Kent State	2	–	6	–	0	2	–	9	–	0
Ohio	0	–	7	–	1	1	–	9	–	1
+ – Conference co-champions

The 1990 Western Michigan Broncos football team represented Western Michigan University in the Mid-American Conference (MAC) during the 1990 NCAA Division I-A football season. In their fourth season under head coach Al Molde, the Broncos compiled a 7–4 record (5–3 against MAC opponents), finished in third place in the MAC, and outscored their opponents, 249 to 218. The team played its home games at Waldo Stadium in Kalamazoo, Michigan.

The team's statistical leaders included Brad Tayles with 2,397 passing yards, Corey Sylve with 840 rushing yards, and Allan Boyko with 792 receiving yards. Linebacker Sean Mulhearn was selected as the MAC defensive player of the year.

== Schedule ==
Date	Time	Opponent	Site	Result	Attendance	Source
September 8		at Eastern Michigan	Rynearson Stadium; Ypsilanti, MI	L 24–27	17,732	
September 15		Louisiana Tech*	Waldo Stadium; Kalamazoo, MI	W 27–21	17,046	
September 22		Kent State	Waldo Stadium; Kalamazoo, MI	W 37–10	13,106	
September 29	2:00 p.m.	at Iowa State*	Cyclone Stadium; Ames, IA	L 20–34	44,589	
October 6		at Akron*	Rubber Bowl; Akron, OH	W 24–20	11,310	
October 13		at Central Michigan	Kelly/Shorts Stadium; Mount Pleasant, MI (rivalry)	L 13–20	27,510	
October 20		Ball State	Waldo Stadium; Kalamazoo, MI	W 14–13	18,061	
October 27		at Ohio	Peden Stadium; Athens, OH	W 31–23	18,115	
November 3	1:00 p.m.	Toledo	Waldo Stadium; Kalamazoo, MI	L 9–37	17,131	
November 10		at Bowling Green	Doyt Perry Stadium; Bowling Green, OH	W 19–13	14,342	
November 17		Miami (OH)	Waldo Stadium; Kalamazoo, MI	W 31–17	7,774	
*Non-conference game; All times are in Eastern time
