= 1992 Eastern Michigan Eagles football team =

American college football season

1992 Eastern Michigan Eagles football
- Conference: Mid-American Conference
- Record: 1–10 (1–7 MAC)
- Head coach: Jim Harkema (10th season; first 4 games); Jan Quarless (interim, final 7 games)
- Captain: Game captains
- Home stadium: Rynearson Stadium

1992 Mid-American Conference football standings
	Conf.					Overall
Team	W		L		T	W		L		T
Bowling Green $	8	–	0	–	0	10	–	2	–	0
Western Michigan	6	–	3	–	0	7	–	3	–	1
Toledo	5	–	3	–	0	8	–	3	–	0
Akron	5	–	3	–	0	7	–	3	–	1
Miami (OH)	5	–	3	–	0	6	–	4	–	1
Ball State	5	–	4	–	0	5	–	6	–	0
Central Michigan	4	–	5	–	0	5	–	6	–	0
Kent State	2	–	7	–	0	2	–	9	–	0
Eastern Michigan	1	–	7	–	0	1	–	10	–	0
Ohio	1	–	7	–	0	1	–	10	–	0
$ – Conference champion

The 1992 Eastern Michigan Eagles football team represented Eastern Michigan University in the 1992 NCAA Division I-A football season. The team compiled a 1–10 record (1–7 against conference opponents), finished in a tie for last place in the Mid-American Conference, and were outscored by their opponents, 336 to 117. Jim Harkema was the head coach for the first four games, compiling a 0–4 and was then replaced by Jan Quarless who compiled a 1–6 record in the final seven games. In the third game of the season, the Hurons were defeated by Penn State by a 52 to 7 score. Harkema had been the head coach since 1983. The team's statistical leaders included Kwesi Ramsey with 592 passing yards, Stephen Whitfield with 377 rushing yards, and Craig Thompson with 329 receiving yards.

== Schedule ==
Date	Opponent	Site	Result	Attendance	Source
September 5	Akron	Rynearson Stadium; Ypsilanti, MI	L 9–27	20,211	
September 12	at Louisiana Tech*	Joe Aillet Stadium; Ruston, LA	L 17–31	21,450	
September 19	at No. 10 Penn State*	Beaver Stadium; University Park, PA	L 7–52	94,578	
September 26	Kent State	Rynearson Stadium; Ypsilanti, MI	L 14–17	13,200	
October 3	Miami (OH)	Rynearson Stadium; Ypsilanti, MI	L 7–24	18,094	
October 10	at Ball State	Ball State Stadium; Muncie, IN	L 7–31		
October 17	at Western Michigan	Waldo Stadium; Kalamazoo, MI	L 19–20		
October 24	Ohio	Rynearson Stadium; Ypsilanti, MI	W 7–6	12,000	
October 31	at Army*	Michie Stadium; West Point, NY	L 17–57	26,179	
November 7	at Central Michigan	Kelly/Shorts Stadium; Mount Pleasant, MI (rivalry)	L 13–30	15,641	
November 14	at Toledo	Glass Bowl; Toledo, OH	L 0–41	14,749	
*Non-conference game; Rankings from AP Poll released prior to the game
