= Riverfront Stadium =

Former multi-purpose stadium in Cincinnati, Ohio

- "The Home of the Big Red Machine" "The Jungle"
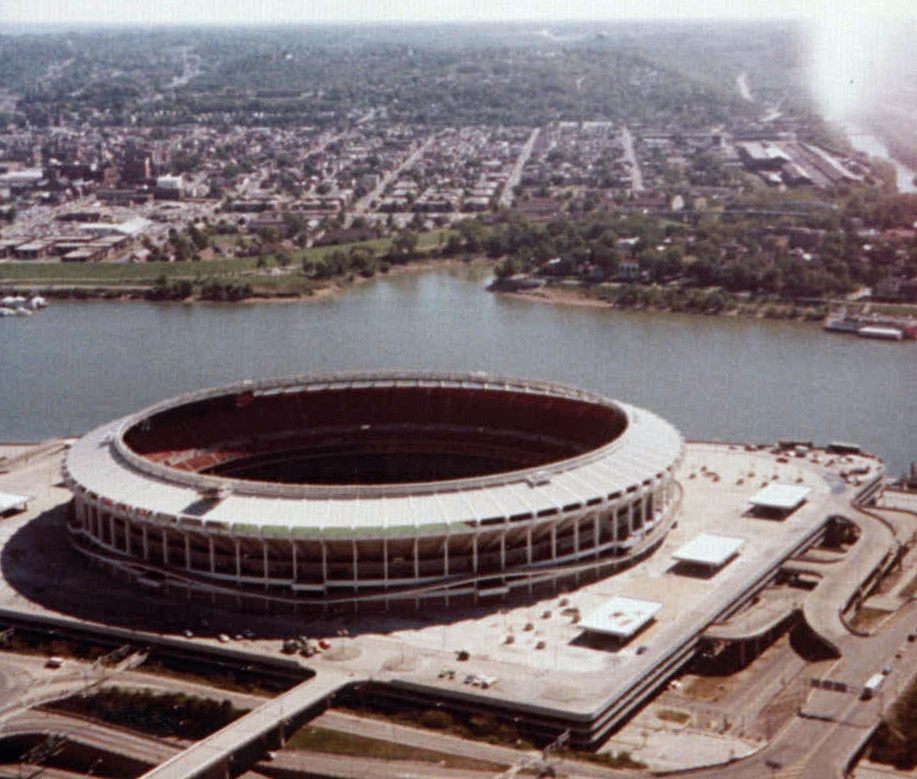
- The Stadium in 1980
- Interactive map of Riverfront Stadium
- Former names: Riverfront Stadium (1970–1996); Cinergy Field (1996–2002)
- Location: 201 East Pete Rose Way, Cincinnati 45202
- Coordinates: 39°5′48″N 84°30′30″W
- Owner: City of Cincinnati
- Capacity: 52,952 (baseball, 1970–2000); 59,754 (football); 39,000 (baseball, 2001–02)
- Surface: AstroTurf 8 (1970–2000); Grass (2001–2002)
- Field size: 1970–2000; Left field – 330 ft (100 m); Left-center field – 375 ft (114 m); Center field – 404 ft (123 m); Right-center field – 375 ft (114 m); Right field – 330 ft (100 m); Backstop – 51 ft (16 m) 2001–2002; Left field – 325 ft (99 m); Left-center field – 370 ft (110 m); Center field – 393 ft (120 m); Right-center field – 373 ft (114 m); Right field – 325 ft (99 m); Backstop – 41 ft (12 m)

Construction
- Groundbreaking: February 1, 1968
- Opened: June 30, 1970
- Closed: September 22, 2002
- Demolished: December 29, 2002
- Cost: US$45 million ($373 million in 2025 dollars)
- Architects: Heery & Heery; FABRAP
- Structural engineers: Prybylowski and Gravino, Inc.
- General contractor: Huber, Hunt & Nichols

Tenants
- Cincinnati Bengals (NFL) (1970–1999); Cincinnati Reds (MLB) (1970–2002); Cincinnati Bearcats (NCAA) (1982–1988; part time, 1990; full time)

Riverfront Stadium, also known as Cinergy Field from 1996 to 2002, was a multi-purpose stadium in Cincinnati, Ohio. It was the home of the Cincinnati Reds of Major League Baseball (MLB) from 1970 through 2002 and the Cincinnati Bengals of the National Football League (NFL) from 1970 to 1999. Located on the Ohio River in downtown Cincinnati, the stadium was best known as the home of the "Big Red Machine", as the Reds were often called in the 1970s.

Construction began on February 1, 1968, and was completed at a cost of less than $50 million. Riverfront's grand opening was held on June 30, 1970, an 8–2 Reds loss to the Atlanta Braves. Braves right fielder Hank Aaron hit the first home run in Riverfront's history, a two-run shot in the first inning which also served as the stadium's first runs batted in. Two weeks later on July 14, 1970, Riverfront hosted the 1970 Major League Baseball All-Star Game. This game is best remembered for the often-replayed collision at home plate between Reds star Pete Rose and catcher Ray Fosse of the Cleveland Indians.

In September 1996, Riverfront Stadium was renamed "Cinergy Field" in a sponsorship deal with Greater Cincinnati energy company Cinergy. In 2001, to make room for Great American Ball Park which was built right next to Riverfront Stadium, much of the outfield seating and elements were removed and the seating capacity at Cinergy Field was reduced to 39,000. There was a huge in-play wall in center field visible after the renovations, to serve as the batter's eye. The stadium was demolished by implosion on December 29, 2002.

== History ==
Riverfront was a multi-purpose, circular "cookie-cutter" stadium, one of many built in the United States in the late 1960s and early 1970s as communities sought to save money by having their football and baseball teams share the same facility. Riverfront, Veterans Stadium in Philadelphia, Busch Memorial Stadium in St. Louis, Atlanta–Fulton County Stadium in Atlanta, Three Rivers Stadium in Pittsburgh, Shea Stadium in New York and Robert F. Kennedy Memorial Stadium in Washington, D.C., all opened within a few years of each other and were largely indistinguishable from one another; in particular, it was often confused with fellow Ohio River cookie-cutter Three Rivers Stadium by sportscasters because of the two stadium's similar names and similar designs.

One feature of Riverfront that distinguished it from other cookie-cutters was that the field level seats ("blue" seats) for baseball were divided in half directly behind home plate. For conversion to a football seating configuration, the third-base side stands were wheeled around clockwise on a track to the area of left field. The first-base side remained stationary. This setup provided a more rectangular zone for the football configuration. The AstroTurf panels covering the tracks could be seen in left field during Reds games.

The site Riverfront Stadium sat on originally included the 2nd Street tenement, birthplace and boyhood home of cowboy singer and actor Roy Rogers, who joked that he was born "somewhere between second base and center field."

Riverfront Stadium's scoreboard was designed by American Sign and Indicator, but in its last years was maintained by Trans-Lux. That scoreboard would be upgraded in the 1980s with the addition of an adjacent Sony JumboTron. The playing field was originally illuminated by 1,648 thousand-watt GTE Sylvania Metalarc lamps.

=== Big Red Machine ===
The Reds moved to Riverfront Stadium midway through the 1970 season, after spending over 86 years at the intersection of Findlay Street and Western Avenue – the last 57½ of those years at Crosley Field. Riverfront quickly earned a place in Cincinnati's century-long baseball tradition as the home of one of the best teams in baseball history. The Reds had only won three pennants in their final 39 years at Crosley Field (1939, 1940, 1961) but made the World Series in Riverfront's first year (1970) and a total of four times in the stadium's first seven years, with the Reds winning back-to-back championships in 1975 and 1976. The World Series would return in 1990, with Cincinnati winning the first two of a four-game sweep of the Oakland Athletics at Riverfront.

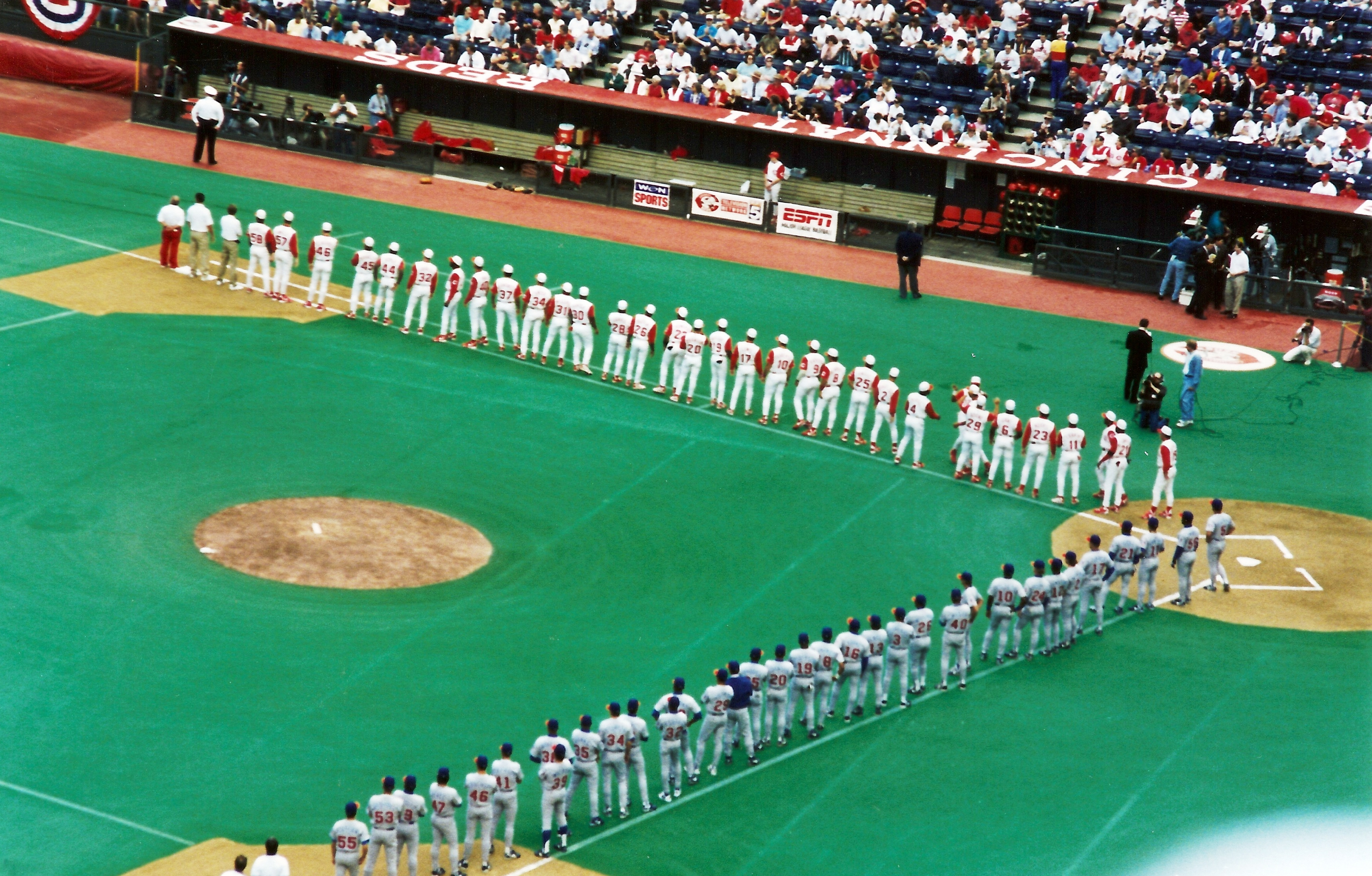
The turf infield and dirt "slide pits" can be seen in this April 1995 photograph.

Baseball purists disliked Riverfront's artificial turf, but Reds' Manager Sparky Anderson and General Manager Bob Howsam took advantage of it by encouraging speed and line drive hitting that could produce doubles, triples and high-bouncing infield hits. Players who combined power and speed like Joe Morgan, Pete Rose and Ken Griffey Sr. thrived there. On defense, the fast surface and virtually dirtless infield (see photo) rewarded range and quickness by both outfielders and infielders, like shortstop Dave Concepción who used the turf to bounce many of his long throws to first. Catcher Johnny Bench and first baseman Tony Pérez played here. The artificial turf covered not only the normal grass area of the ballpark but also most of the normally dirt-covered portion of the infield; the infield area boundary where dirt would normally be was denoted with a white lined arc. Only the pitcher's mound, the home plate area (in two circled areas), and cutouts around first, second and third bases had dirt surfaces (which were covered in five-sided diamond shaped areas). This was the first stadium in the majors with this "sliding pit" configuration. Most of the new stadiums with artificial turf that would follow (Veterans Stadium, Royals Stadium, Louisiana Superdome, Olympic Stadium (Montreal), Exhibition Stadium, Kingdome, Hubert H. Humphrey Metrodome, BC Place, SkyDome) installed sliding pits as the original layout, and the existing artificial turf fields in San Francisco, Houston, Pittsburgh, and St. Louis would change to the cut-out configuration within the next few years after Riverfront's opening.

Riverfront hosted the MLB All-Star Game twice: first on July 14, 1970, with President Richard Nixon in attendance (51,838 total attendance), and again on July 12, 1988 (55,837 attendance).

=== Professional football ===
Despite Cincinnati's love of baseball, it was the prospect of a professional football team that finally moved the city to end 20 years of discussion and build a new stadium on the downtown riverfront. After playing for two seasons at Nippert Stadium on the University of Cincinnati campus, the Bengals built on the Reds' success in the stadium's first year when they recorded their first winning season and playoff appearance in 1970, just their third year of existence.

Perhaps the most memorable football game at Riverfront Stadium was the 1981 AFC Championship Game on January 10, 1982. The game became known as the Freezer Bowl and was won by the Bengals over the San Diego Chargers, 27–7. The air temperature during the game was −9 °F (−23 °C) and the wind chill was −37 °F (−38 °C), the coldest in NFL history. The win earned the Bengals their first of two trips to the Super Bowl (XVI) while playing at Riverfront Stadium, and the first of three in team history overall.

Riverfront Stadium hosted the 1988 AFC Championship Game, as the Bengals beat the Buffalo Bills 21–10 to advance to their second Super Bowl appearance.

During the Bengals' tenure, they defeated every visiting franchise at least once, enjoying perfect records against the Arizona Cardinals (4–0), New York Giants (4–0), and Philadelphia Eagles (3–0). They posted a 5–1 record in playoff games played in Riverfront Stadium, with victories over the Buffalo Bills (twice), San Diego Chargers, Seattle Seahawks, and Houston Oilers. Their only home playoff loss came to the New York Jets.

For most of the Bengals' tenure at the stadium, the field contained only the basic markings required for play. Until the late 1990s, there wasn't a logo at midfield or any writing in the end zone, which had long become standard in NFL stadiums.

During the 1988 season as the Bengals were making another Super Bowl run, Riverfront Stadium was nicknamed the Jungle as the Bengals went a perfect 10–0 at home during the regular season and in the playoffs. With the new stadium nickname, the fans and team adopted the Guns N' Roses song "Welcome to the Jungle" as the unofficial theme song for the Bengals. When Paul Brown Stadium (now Paycor Stadium) opened in 2000, the Jungle theme was incorporated into the stadium design.

=== College football ===
Between 1970 and 1990 Riverfront Stadium hosted 25 University of Cincinnati football games to accommodate higher-caliber visiting teams and local rivals which would overwhelm demand in their usual on-campus home, Nippert Stadium (which then could only hold 28,000). Among the Bearcats' opponents were the University of Maryland, University of Kentucky, University of Louisville, Boston College, West Virginia University, Penn State University, whose 1985 game took place with the Nittany Lions number one in the coaches' poll, and the University of Miami three times, twice while the Hurricanes were the defending national champions. It would be a temporary full-time home for the Bearcats during the 1990 season, when Nippert Stadium was undergoing renovations.

The Bearcats finished with a 12–13 all-time record at Riverfront.

List of college football games at the stadium
Date	Home team	Opponent	Score	Attendance
September 19, 1970	Cincinnati	Dayton	13–7	19,781
November 8, 1975	Cincinnati	No. 16 Maryland	19–21	16,478
September 11, 1982	Cincinnati	Louisville	38–16	14,324
October 9, 1982	Cincinnati	Long Beach State	34–14	13,187
November 13, 1982	Cincinnati	Morgan State	52–0	17,965
November 18, 1982	Cincinnati	Miami (OH)	20–10	26,101
October 1, 1983	Cincinnati	Cornell	48–20	13,840
October 8, 1983	Cincinnati	Temple	31–16	18,272
October 22, 1983	Cincinnati	No. 8 Miami (FL)	7–17	14,163
November 5, 1983	Cincinnati	Rutgers	18–7	18,484
November 12, 1983	Cincinnati	Memphis State	43–10	12,125
October 13, 1984	Cincinnati	No. 10 Miami (FL)	25–49	25,642
October 27, 1984	Cincinnati	Louisville	40–21	15,767
November 17, 1984	Cincinnati	Alabama	7–29	27,482
November 22, 1984	Cincinnati	Miami (OH)	26–31	15,211
October 5, 1985	Cincinnati	Temple	16–28	12,103
October 26, 1985	Cincinnati	Boston College	24–17	17,217
November 9, 1985	Cincinnati	No. 2 Penn State	10–31	33,528
September 13, 1986	Cincinnati	Miami (OH)	45–38	23,709
September 27, 1986	Cincinnati	Kentucky	20–37	36,233
October 24, 1987	Cincinnati	No. 3 Miami (FL)	10–48	20,011
November 5, 1988	Cincinnati	No. 4 West Virginia	13–51	21,511
September 2, 1990	Cincinnati	Bowling Green	20–34	6,563
September 22, 1990	Cincinnati	Miami (OH)	12–16	9,794
November 3, 1990	Cincinnati	No. 25 Louisville	16–41	23,575

=== Final years as a baseball-only stadium ===
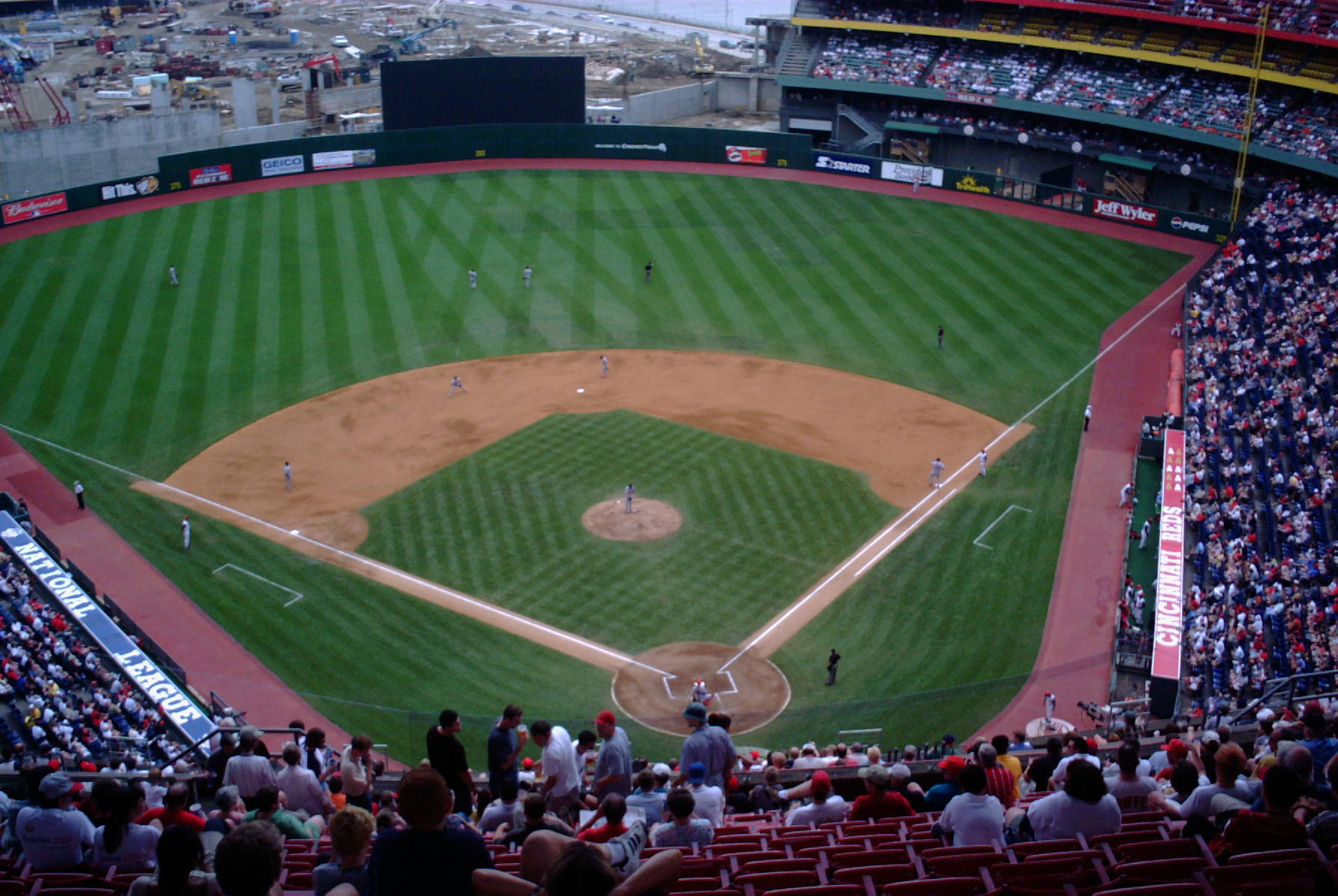
Riverfront Stadium during a Cincinnati Reds game vs. the St. Louis Cardinals on August 23, 2001. Construction of Great American Ballpark is visible in the background.

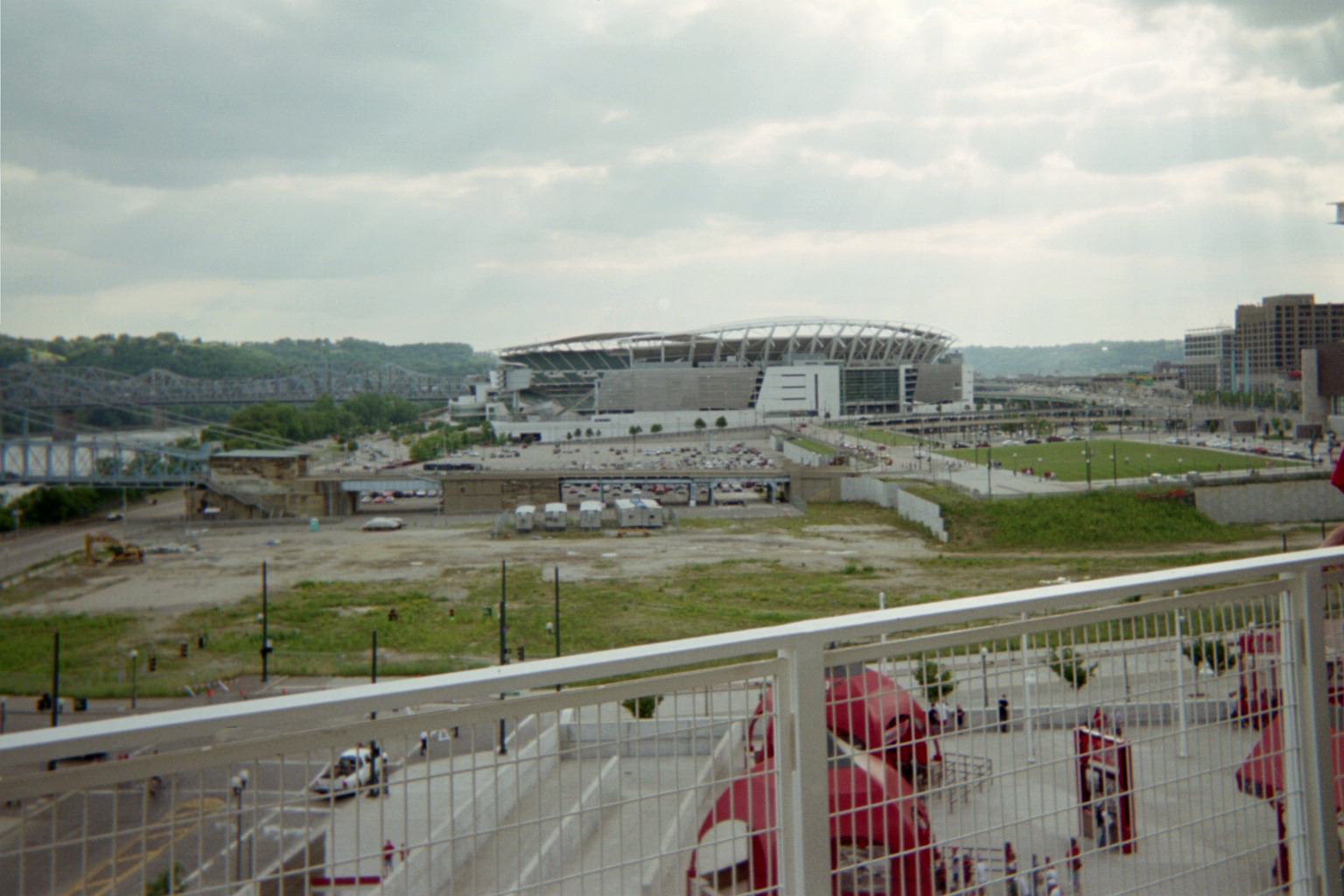
The Riverfront Stadium site in June 2006. This photo was taken from the western concourse of Great American Ball Park. The Reds' Hall of Fame and Museum, Main Street, and the Cincinnati Bengals' Paycor Stadium (then known as Paul Brown Stadium) is in the distance.

When the Bengals moved to Paul Brown Stadium in 2000, the Reds were left as Riverfront Stadium’s only tenant. Prior to the 2001 baseball season, the stadium was remodeled into a baseball-only configuration, and the artificial turf surface was replaced with natural grass.

To allow room for the construction of Great American Ball Park, which was being built largely over the grounds the stadium already sat on, a large section of the left and center field stands was removed and the distance to the fences was shortened by 5 feet (1.5 m). The new and old stadium were 26 inches (66 cm) apart at their closest point during this time. A 40-foot (12 m) wall was built in deep center field to prevent easy home runs and to serve as a batter's eye. It was nicknamed the "Black Monster", a play on the Green Monster at Fenway Park in Boston.

In the Reds' final two seasons in the stadium, ongoing construction on Great American was plainly visible just beyond the outfield walls while the team played their games. The stadium's final game was played on September 22, 2002, as the Reds lost, 4–3, to the Philadelphia Phillies before a crowd of 40,964. Reds third baseman Aaron Boone hit the final home run in Riverfront's history in the loss, an eighth-inning solo home run off Phillies reliever Dan Plesac. Notably, a single red rose would be placed just behind home plate during the game as a silent tribute to Pete Rose. The television network ESPN Classic would honor the stadium's closure with an all-day marathon of Bengals and Reds highlight broadcasts on September 28, including a SportsCenter biography on Johnny Bench, branded by the network as "Classic's Good-Bye to Riverfront Stadium".

The stadium was demolished by implosion on December 29, 2002. Part of the former Riverfront Stadium site is now occupied by Great American Ball Park (which opened the following April) and the National Underground Railroad Freedom Center, along with several mixed-use developments and parking facilities. A small portion of the site is now occupied by the Reds' Hall of Fame and Museum and Main Street, which was extended when the new park was built and when the old park was demolished.

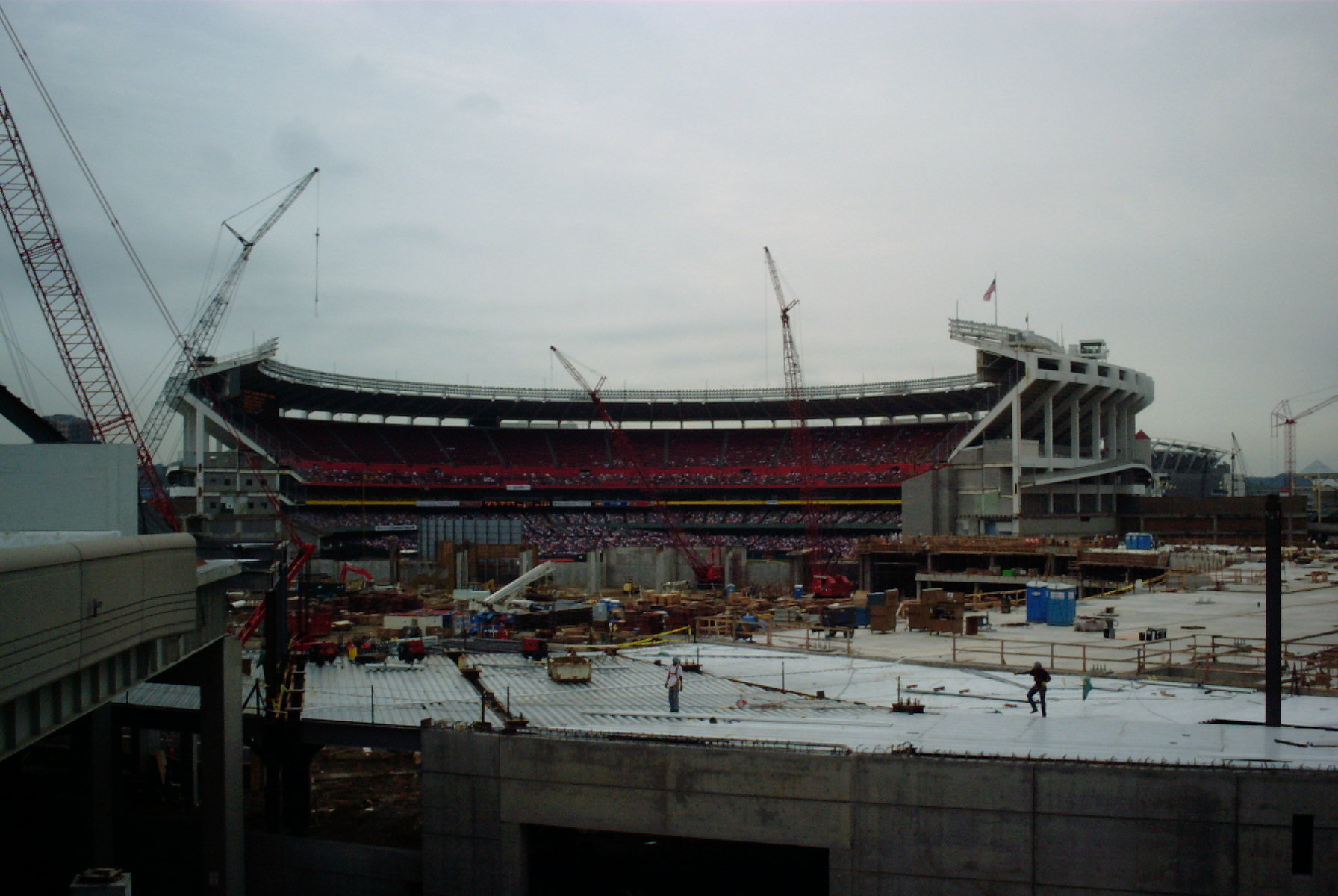
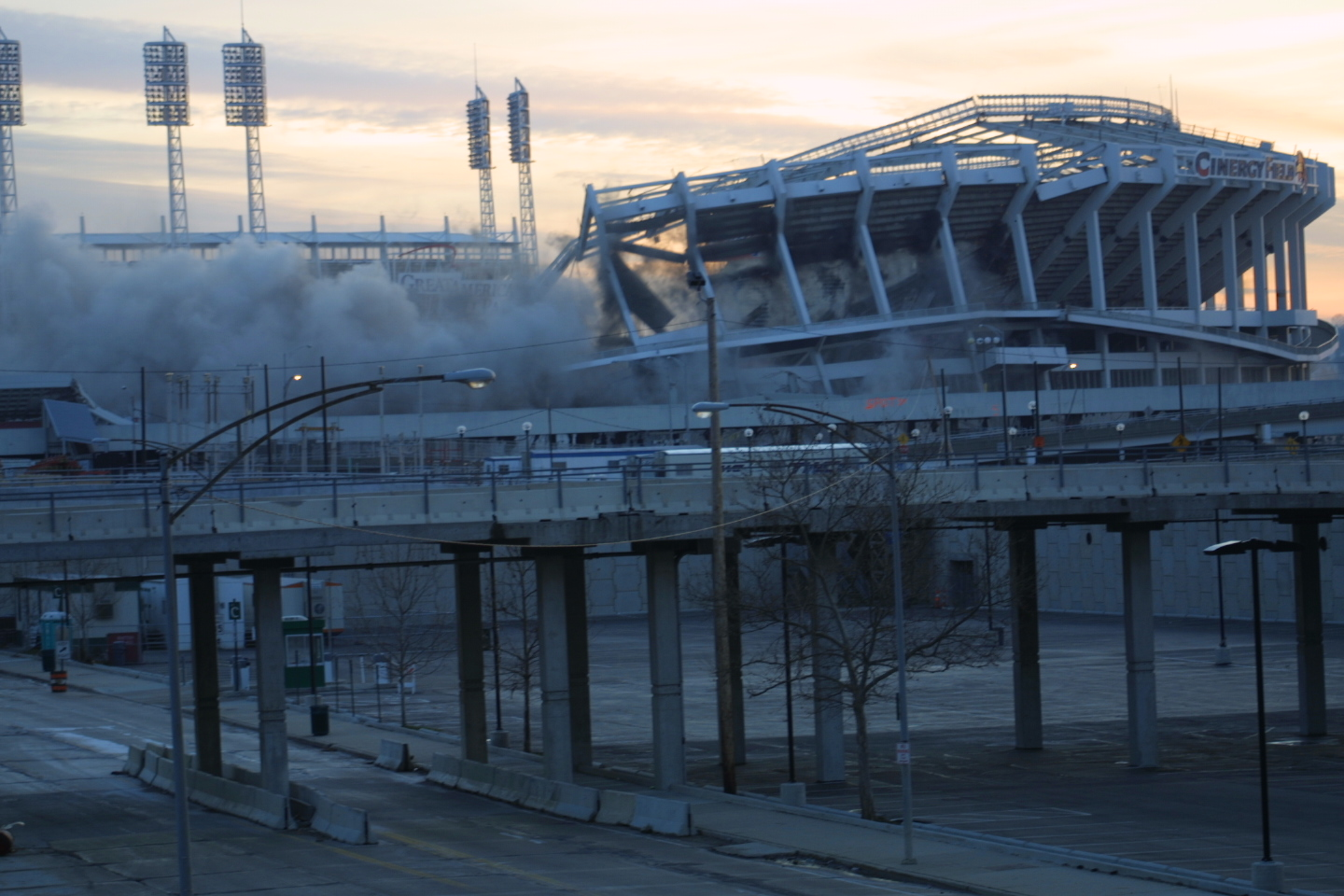
The stadium after the left and center field stands were removed (left) and during its implosion (right)

== Seating capacity ==
Baseball
Years	Capacity
1970	51,500
1971	51,744
1972–1974	51,726
1975–1983	51,786
1984–1991	52,392
1992–2000	52,952
2001–2002	40,007

Football
Years	Capacity
1970–1980	56,200
1981–1991	59,754
1992–1999	60,389

== Attendance records ==
Bold indicates the winner of each game.

=== Baseball ===
**Highest Baseball attendance at Riverfront Stadium**
Rank	Attendance	Date	Game result	Notes
1	56,393	October 16, 1975	**Reds 6**, Red Sox 2	1975 World Series, Game 5
2	56,079	October 12, 1990	**Reds 2**, Pirates 1	1990 NLCS, Game 6
3	56,040	October 22, 1972	**Athletics 3**, Reds 2	1972 World Series, Game 7
4	55,832	October 17, 1990	**Reds 5**, Athletics 4 (10)	1990 World Series, Game 2
5	55,830	October 16, 1990	**Reds 7**, Athletics 0	1990 World Series, Game 1

- The 1988 All-Star Game had an attendance of 55,837

=== Football ===
**Highest Football attendance at Riverfront Stadium**
Rank	Attendance	Date	Game result
1	60,284	October 17, 1971	Bengals 24, **Browns 27**
2	60,157	December 20, 1970	**Bengals 45**, Patriots 7
3	60,099	October 10, 1970	Bengals 13, **Dolphins** 23
4	60,084	December 9, 1990	Bengals 17, **49ers** 20
5	60,067	November 4, 1990	Bengals 7, **Saints 21**

== Milestones ==
=== Baseball ===
The logo the Reds used in 2002 for their final season at Riverfront Stadium

- First stadium to have its entire field covered by AstroTurf, except for the cutouts around the bases and pitcher's mound.
- First hit: Félix Millán, June 30, 1970.
- First home run: Hank Aaron, June 30, 1970.
- First Presidential Visit: Richard Nixon, July 14, 1970.
- First upper deck home run: Tony Pérez, August 11, 1970.
- First World Series game ever played on artificial turf: October 10, 1970 (Reds vs. Baltimore Orioles).
- First no-hitter: Ken Holtzman, June 3, 1971.
- First pitcher ever to pitch a no-hitter and hit two home runs in the same game: Rick Wise, June 23, 1971.
- Hank Aaron ties the all-time home run record with number 714: April 4, 1974.
- First stadium to display metric distances on the outfield walls (100.58 meters down the lines, 114.30 to the alleys, 123.13 to center): 1976.
- Highest season attendance, 2,629,708: 1976.
- First rain checks issued: August 30, 1978.
- First player to hit for the cycle: Mike Easler, June 12, 1980.
- Pete Rose breaks the all-time hit record with number 4,192: September 11, 1985.
- First player ever to be caught stealing four times in one game: Robby Thompson, June 27, 1986.
- Perfect Game: Tom Browning, September 16, 1988.
- Umpire John McSherry collapsed and died on April 1, 1996.
- Ray Lankford hits two upper-deck home runs on July 15, 1997, becoming the only player to do so in the stadium's history to that point.
- Longest home run, 473': Mark McGwire, May 5, 2000.

=== Football ===
- First touchdown: Sam Wyche, September 20, 1970
- First Field goal: Horst Muhlmann, September 20, 1970
- Freezer Bowl: lowest wind-chill (2nd lowest temperature) in NFL history, January 10, 1982
- Steve Largent becomes the first player in NFL History to catch 100 TD's in career, December 10, 1989.
- Corey Dillon breaks the single-game rookie rushing record with 246 yards on December 4, 1997.

== Concerts ==
Date	Artist	Opening act(s)	Tour / concert name	Attendance	Revenue	Notes
August 16, 1978	The Eagles	Eddie Money; The Steve Miller Band	Hotel California Tour	51,855	—	
September 14, 1989	The Rolling Stones	Living Colour	Steel Wheels Tour	53,555 / 53,555	$1,522,536	
July 10, 1990	New Kids on the Block	Perfect Gentlemen	The Magic Summer Tour	48,000 / 48,000	—	
May 5, 1993	Paul McCartney	—	The New World Tour	38,000 / 40,000	$1,156,513	
August 30, 1994	The Rolling Stones	Lenny Kravitz	Voodoo Lounge Tour	34,137 / 55,000	—	
May 21, 2000	George Strait	Asleep at the Wheel; Lee Ann Womack; Mark Chesnutt; Kenny Chesney; Martina McBride	George Strait Country Music Festival	42,000	—	
July 14, 2000	'N Sync	Sisqo; P!nk	No Strings Attached Tour	48,234 / 48,234	$2,091,097	
June 6, 2001	'N Sync	Dream	Pop Odyssey Tour	36,371 / 42,285	$1,947,461	

- The Kool Jazz Festival (now the Macy's Music Festival) was an annual fixture.

== Religious gatherings ==
- The Jehovah's Witnesses hosted three conventions in the stadium, in 1971, 1974 and 1978.
- Promise Keepers held a meeting there in 1997.

== Gallery ==
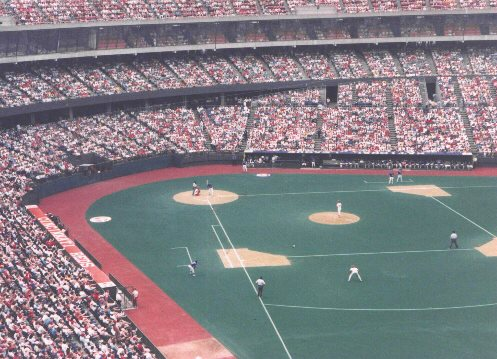
Riverfront Stadium during a Cincinnati Reds game vs. the Chicago Cubs on May 23, 1988

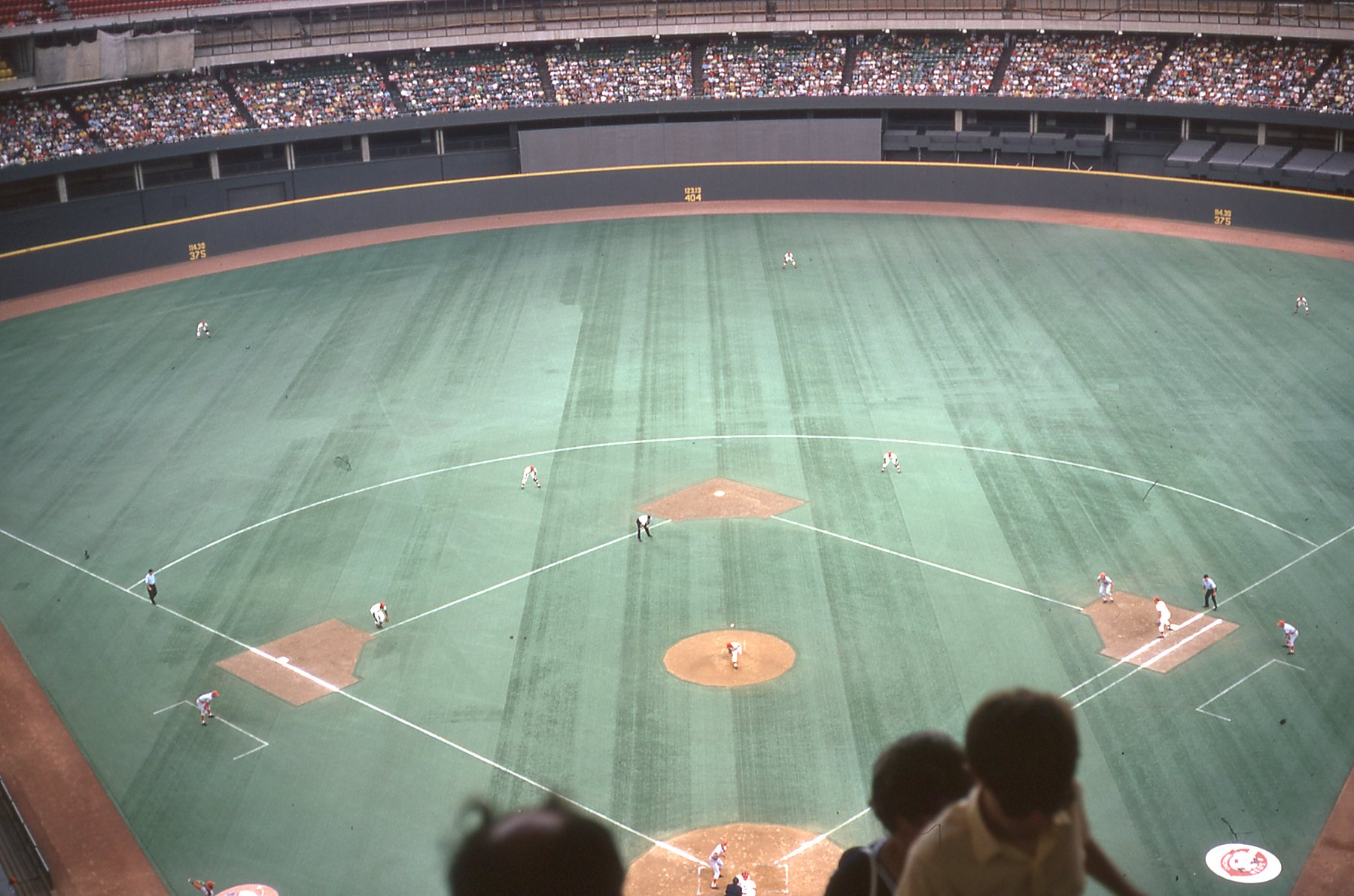
Riverfront Stadium in July 1974

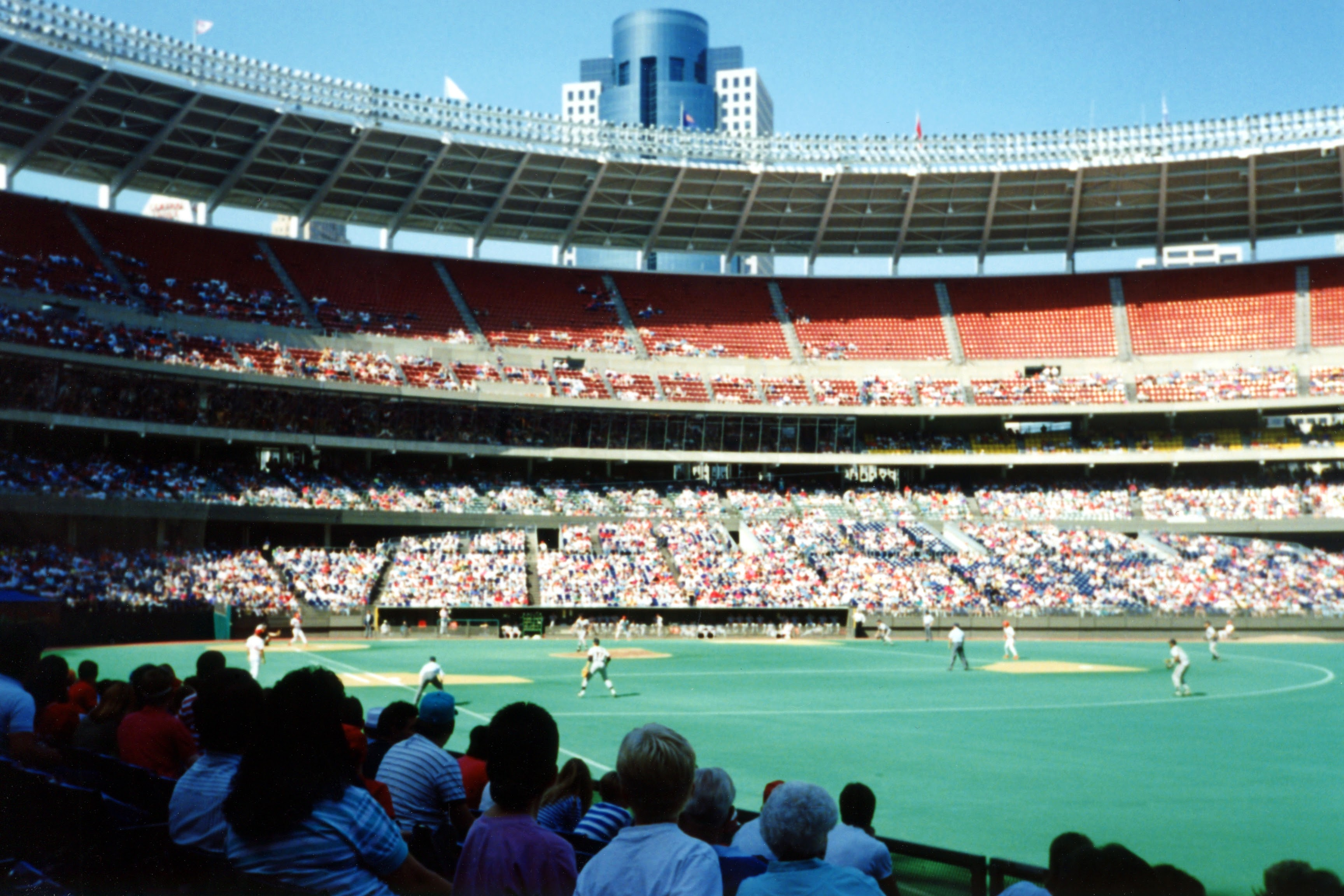
Riverfront Stadium in 1992

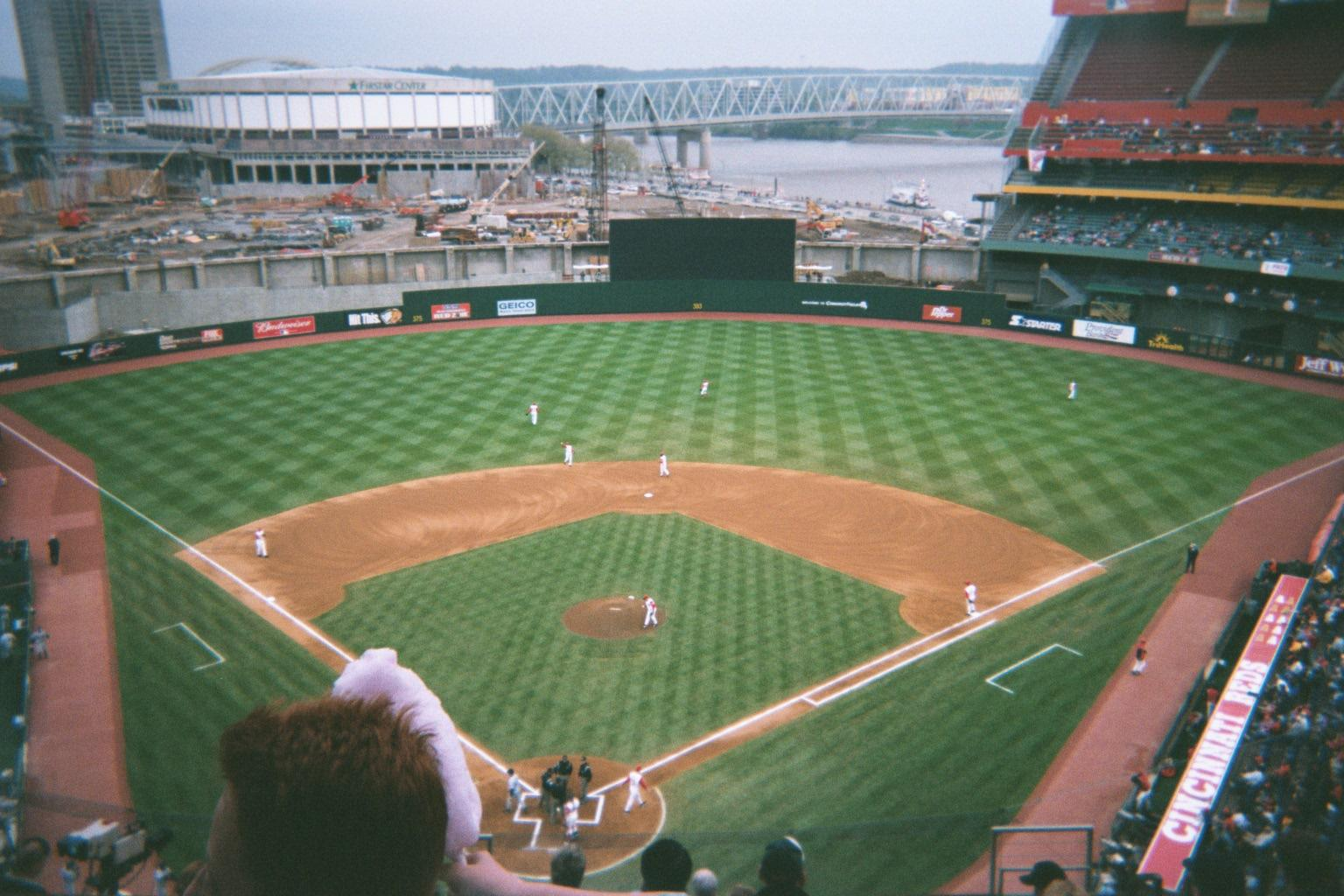
Riverfront Stadium during a Cincinnati Reds game vs. the New York Mets on April 27, 2001

Events and tenants
Preceded by Nippert Stadium	Home of the Cincinnati Bengals; 1970–1999	Succeeded by Paul Brown Stadium
Preceded by Crosley Field	Home of the Cincinnati Reds; 1970–2002	Succeeded by Great American Ball Park
Preceded by RFK Stadium; Oakland–Alameda County Coliseum	Host of the All-Star Game; 1970; 1988	Succeeded by Tiger Stadium; Anaheim Stadium
Preceded by Jack Murphy Stadium; Mile High Stadium	Host of AFC Championship Game; 1982; 1989	Succeeded by Miami Orange Bowl; Mile High Stadium
