= 1992 Central Michigan Chippewas football team =

American college football season

1992 Central Michigan Chippewas football
- Conference: Mid-American Conference
- Record: 5–6 (4–5 MAC)
- Head coach: Herb Deromedi (15th season)
- Offensive coordinator: Tom Kearly (2nd season)
- MVP: Joe Youngblood
- Home stadium: Kelly/Shorts Stadium

1992 Mid-American Conference football standings
	Conf.					Overall
Team	W		L		T	W		L		T
Bowling Green $	8	–	0	–	0	10	–	2	–	0
Western Michigan	6	–	3	–	0	7	–	3	–	1
Toledo	5	–	3	–	0	8	–	3	–	0
Akron	5	–	3	–	0	7	–	3	–	1
Miami (OH)	5	–	3	–	0	6	–	4	–	1
Ball State	5	–	4	–	0	5	–	6	–	0
Central Michigan	4	–	5	–	0	5	–	6	–	0
Kent State	2	–	7	–	0	2	–	9	–	0
Eastern Michigan	1	–	7	–	0	1	–	10	–	0
Ohio	1	–	7	–	0	1	–	10	–	0
$ – Conference champion

The 1992 Central Michigan Chippewas football team represented Central Michigan University in the Mid-American Conference (MAC) during the 1992 NCAA Division I-A football season. In their 15th season under head coach Herb Deromedi, the Chippewas compiled a 5–6 record (4–5 against MAC opponents), finished in seventh place in the MAC, and outscored their opponents, 247 to 170. The team played its home games in Kelly/Shorts Stadium in Mount Pleasant, Michigan, with attendance of 96,417 in five home games.

The highlight of Central Michigan's 1992 season was its defeat of Michigan State for the second consecutive year. The Chippewas had opened the season with a loss to Kentucky before defeating the Spartans, 24–20, at Spartan Stadium on September 12, 1992. Central Michigan quarterback Joe Youngblood, who had been denied a scholarship offer by Michigan State, led the Chippewas by completing 17 of 22 passes for 163 yards and two touchdowns and also catching a pass for 29 yards on a trick play. In a key defensive stand for the Chippewas in the second quarter, Michigan State tailback Craig Thomas fumbled the ball at Central's one-yard line after being hit by Chippewa defensive back Darrall Stinson, and Oscar Ford recovered the ball in the end zone for the Chippewas. In the third quarter, Michigan State kicker Jim DelVerne missed a 31-yard field goal attempt. Brian Pruitt scored a fourth quarter touchdown to put the Chippewas ahead, 24–14.

The team's statistical leaders included quarterback Joe Youngblood with 2,209 passing yards, tailback Brian Pruitt with 859 rushing yards, and flanker Terrance McMillan with 649 receiving yards. Youngblood was named as Central Michigan's most valuable player for the first of what would be two consecutive years. Offensive guard Marty Malcolm, center Art Droski, and defensive lineman Mike Nettie were selected as first-team All-MAC players.

== Schedule ==
Date	Time	Opponent	Site	Result	Attendance	Source
September 5		at Kentucky*	Commonwealth Stadium; Lexington, KY	L 14–21	56,800	
September 12	1:00 p.m.	at Michigan State*	Spartan Stadium; East Lansing, MI	W 24–20	65,123	
September 19		Ohio	Kelly/Shorts Stadium; Mount Pleasant, MI	W 24–0	18,356	
September 26		Toledo	Kelly/Shorts Stadium; Mount Pleasant, MI	W 28–9	21,113	
October 3		Bowling Green	Kelly/Shorts Stadium; Mount Pleasant, MI	L 14–17	22,875	
October 10		at Miami (OH)	Yager Stadium; Oxford, OH	L 13–16		
October 17		Kent State	Kelly/Shorts Stadium; Mount Pleasant, MI	W 35–0	18,612	
October 24		at Ball State	Ball State Stadium; Muncie, IN	L 23–24		
October 31		at Akron	Rubber Bowl; Akron, OH	L 28–31	4,760	
November 7		Eastern Michigan	Kelly/Shorts Stadium; Mount Pleasant, MI (rivalry)	W 30–13	15,641	
November 14		at Western Michigan	Waldo Stadium; Kalamazoo, MI (rivalry)	L 14–19	16,352	
*Non-conference game; All times are in Eastern time
