= 1992 Bowling Green Falcons football team =

American college football season

1992 Bowling Green Falcons football

MAC champion Las Vegas Bowl champion

Las Vegas Bowl, W 35–34 vs. Nevada
- Conference: Mid-American Conference
- Record: 10–2 (8–0 MAC)
- Head coach: Gary Blackney (2nd season)
- Defensive coordinator: Paul Ferraro (2nd season)
- Home stadium: Doyt Perry Stadium

1992 Mid-American Conference football standings
	Conf.					Overall
Team	W		L		T	W		L		T
Bowling Green $	8	–	0	–	0	10	–	2	–	0
Western Michigan	6	–	3	–	0	7	–	3	–	1
Toledo	5	–	3	–	0	8	–	3	–	0
Akron	5	–	3	–	0	7	–	3	–	1
Miami (OH)	5	–	3	–	0	6	–	4	–	1
Ball State	5	–	4	–	0	5	–	6	–	0
Central Michigan	4	–	5	–	0	5	–	6	–	0
Kent State	2	–	7	–	0	2	–	9	–	0
Eastern Michigan	1	–	7	–	0	1	–	10	–	0
Ohio	1	–	7	–	0	1	–	10	–	0
$ – Conference champion

The 1992 Bowling Green Falcons football team was an American football team that represented Bowling Green University in the Mid-American Conference (MAC) during the 1992 NCAA Division I-A football season. In their second season under head coach Gary Blackney, the Falcons compiled a 10–2 record (8–0 against MAC opponents), won the MAC championship, defeated Nevada in the Las Vegas Bowl, and outscored all opponents by a combined total of 324 to 235.

The team's statistical leaders included Erik White with 2,380 passing yards, Zeb Jackson with 730 rushing yards, and Mark Szlachcic with 834 receiving yards.

== Schedule ==
Date	Opponent	Site	Result	Attendance	Source
September 3	Western Michigan	Doyt Perry Stadium; Bowling Green, OH	W 29–19	17,824	
September 12	at No. 22 Ohio State*	Ohio Stadium; Columbus, OH	L 6–17	94,808	
September 19	at Wisconsin*	Camp Randall Stadium; Madison, WI	L 18–39	57,758	
September 26	East Carolina*	Doyt Perry Stadium; Bowling Green, OH	W 44–34	12,512	
October 3	at Central Michigan	Kelly/Shorts Stadium; Mount Pleasant, MI	W 17–14	22,875	
October 10	Ohio	Doyt Perry Stadium; Bowling Green, OH	W 31–14	15,903	
October 17	at Toledo	Glass Bowl; Toledo, OH (rivalry)	W 10–9		
October 24	at Akron	Rubber Bowl; Akron, OH	W 24–3	10,107	
October 31	Miami (OH)	Doyt Perry Stadium; Bowling Green, OH	W 44–24	18,303	
November 7	at Kent State	Dix Stadium; Kent, OH (Anniversary Award)	W 28–22	5,916	
November 14	Ball State	Doyt Perry Stadium; Bowling Green, OH	W 38–6	13,487	
December 18	at Nevada*	Sam Boyd Silver Bowl; East Las Vegas, NV (Las Vegas Bowl)	W 35–34	15,476	
*Non-conference game; Rankings from AP Poll released prior to the game
