= 1992 Miami Redskins football team =

American college football season

1992 Miami Redskins football
- Conference: Mid-American Conference
- Record: 6–4–1 (5–3 MAC)
- Head coach: Randy Walker (3rd season)
- Offensive coordinator: Kevin Wilson (1st season)
- Defensive coordinator: Tim Carras (3rd season)
- Home stadium: Yager Stadium

1992 Mid-American Conference football standings
	Conf.					Overall
Team	W		L		T	W		L		T
Bowling Green $	8	–	0	–	0	10	–	2	–	0
Western Michigan	6	–	3	–	0	7	–	3	–	1
Toledo	5	–	3	–	0	8	–	3	–	0
Akron	5	–	3	–	0	7	–	3	–	1
Miami (OH)	5	–	3	–	0	6	–	4	–	1
Ball State	5	–	4	–	0	5	–	6	–	0
Central Michigan	4	–	5	–	0	5	–	6	–	0
Kent State	2	–	7	–	0	2	–	9	–	0
Eastern Michigan	1	–	7	–	0	1	–	10	–	0
Ohio	1	–	7	–	0	1	–	10	–	0
$ – Conference champion

The 1992 Miami Redskins football team was an American football team that represented Miami University in the Mid-American Conference (MAC) during the 1992 NCAA Division I-A football season. In its third season under head coach Randy Walker, the team compiled a 6–4–1 record (5–3 against MAC opponents), finished in a tie for third place in the MAC, and outscored all opponents by a combined total of 210 to 204.

The team's statistical leaders included Neil Dougherty with 1,486 passing yards, Deland McCullough with 1,026 rushing yards, and Jeremy Patterson with 370 receiving yards.

== Schedule ==
Date	Opponent	Site	Result	Attendance	Source
September 5	at West Virginia*	Mountaineer Field; Morgantown, WV	T 29–29	45,418	
September 12	at Indiana*	Memorial Stadium; Bloomington, IN	L 0–16	38,815	
September 19	Cincinnati*	Yager Stadium; Oxford, OH (rivalry)	W 17–14	26,274	
September 26	at Ball State	Ball State Stadium; Muncie, IN	L 9–19		
October 3	at Eastern Michigan	Rynearson Stadium; Ypsilanti, MI	W 24–7	18,094	
October 10	Central Michigan	Yager Stadium; Oxford, OH	W 16–13		
October 17	at Ohio	Peden Stadium; Athens, OH (rivalry)	W 23–21	20,551	
October 24	Toledo	Yager Stadium; Oxford, OH	L 17–20	13,242	
October 31	at Bowling Green	Doyt Perry Stadium; Bowling Green, OH	L 24–44	18,303	
November 7	Western Michigan	Yager Stadium; Oxford, OH	W 20–7	21,757	
November 14	Kent State	Yager Stadium; Oxford, OH	W 31–14	8,991	
*Non-conference game

== Roster ==
1992 Miami Redskins football team roster
Players			Coaches
Offense: Pos. / # / Name / Class	Defense: Pos. / # / Name / Class	Special teams: Pos. / # / Name / Class	Head coach: Randy Walker; Coordinators/assistant coaches Kevin Wilson (Offensive Coordinator) Tim Carras (Defensive Coordinator) Jack Glowik (Defensive Line) Terry Hoeppner (Secondary) Aaron Kromer (Tight Ends) Pat Narduzzi (Wide Receivers) Jay Peterson (Outside Linebackers) Don Treadwell (Running Backs) Shawn Watson (Quarterbacks) Legend: (C) Team captain; (S) Suspended; (I) Ineligible; Injured; Redshirt
