= 1990 Eastern Michigan Hurons football team =

American college football season

1990 Eastern Michigan Hurons football
- Conference: Mid-American Conference
- Record: 2–9 (2–6 MAC)
- Head coach: Jim Harkema (8th season)
- Captain: Game captains
- Home stadium: Rynearson Stadium

1990 Mid-American Conference football standings
	Conf.					Overall
Team	W		L		T	W		L		T
Toledo +	7	–	1	–	0	9	–	2	–	0
Central Michigan +	7	–	1	–	0	8	–	3	–	1
Ball State	5	–	3	–	0	7	–	4	–	0
Western Michigan	5	–	3	–	0	7	–	4	–	0
Miami (OH)	4	–	3	–	1	5	–	5	–	1
Bowling Green	2	–	4	–	2	3	–	5	–	2
Eastern Michigan	2	–	6	–	0	2	–	9	–	0
Kent State	2	–	6	–	0	2	–	9	–	0
Ohio	0	–	7	–	1	1	–	9	–	1
+ – Conference co-champions

The 1990 Eastern Michigan Hurons football team represented Eastern Michigan University in the 1990 NCAA Division I-A football season. In their eighth season under head coach Jim Harkema, the Hurons compiled a 2–9 record (2–6 against conference opponents), finished in a tie for seventh place in the Mid-American Conference, and were outscored by their opponents, 301 to 179. The team's statistical leaders included Shane Jackson with 1,454 passing yards, Ed Nwagbaraocha with 402 rushing yards, and Todd Bell with 400 receiving yards.

== Schedule ==
Date	Time	Opponent	Site	Result	Attendance	Source
September 1		at Fresno State*	Bulldog Stadium; Fresno, CA	L 10–41	32,188	
September 8		Western Michigan	Rynearson Stadium; Ypsilanti, MI	W 27–24	17,732	
September 15		Ohio	Rynearson Stadium; Ypsilanti, MI	W 21–18		
September 22		at No. 15 Youngstown State*	Stambaugh Stadium; Youngstown, OH	L 14–24		
September 29		at Indiana*	Memorial Stadium; Bloomington, IN	L 6–37	40,043	
October 6	1:00 p.m.	at Toledo	Glass Bowl; Toledo, OH	L 23–37	25,079	
October 20		at Bowling Green	Doyt Perry Stadium; Bowling Green, OH	L 15–25	16,477	
October 27		Central Michigan	Rynearson Stadium; Ypsilanti, MI (rivalry)	L 12–16	24,662	
November 3		at Miami (OH)	Yager Stadium; Oxford, OH	L 14–34	24,126	
November 10		Ball State	Rynearson Stadium; Ypsilanti, MI	L 13–20		
November 17		at Kent State	Dix Stadium; Kent, OH	L 24–25		
*Non-conference game; Rankings from NCAA Division I-AA Football Committee Poll released prior to the game; All times are in Eastern time
