= 1990 California Bowl =

- Bowl Game
Central Michigan Chippewas	San Jose State Spartans
(8–2–1)	(8–2–1)
24	48
Head coach: Herb Deromedi	Head coach: Terry Shea
AP / Coaches; NR / NR	AP / Coaches; NR / 25
	1	2	3	4	Total
Central Michigan	0	7	3	14	24
San Jose State	7	19	15	7	48
- Date: December 8, 1990
- Season: 1990
- Stadium: Bulldog Stadium
- Location: Fresno, California
- Referee: Nick Define (MAC) (split crew: MAC and Big West)
- Attendance: 25,431

United States TV coverage
- Network: Sportschannel
- Announcers: Greg Papa and Jack Snow

The 1990 California Bowl was an American college football bowl game played on December 8, 1990 at Bulldog Stadium in Fresno, California. The game pitted the San Jose State Spartans and the Central Michigan Chippewas.

== Background ==
The Spartans went a perfect 7–0 in conference play, with a tie to Louisville in their opener and losses to #20 Washington and California. They secured the Big West Conference championship by beating Fresno State, the 1988 and 1989 BWC champions, 42-7. It was their first Big West Conference championship since 1987, along with their fourth in nine years.

The Chippewas were co-champions of the Mid-American Conference (with Toledo, who they had beaten, 13–12). They had only two losses (to Kentucky and Ball State) and one tie (to independent Akron) in their first conference title since 1980. This was their first ever bowl game appearance.

== Game summary ==
- San Jose State - Canley 5-yard run (Bowen PAT)
- San Jose State - Bowen 37-yard field goal
- Central Michigan - Ealy 55-yard pass from Bender (Nicholl PAT)
- San Jose State - Canley 22-yard run
- San Jose State - Blackmon 25-yard pass from Martini (run failed)
- San Jose State - Bowen 25-yard field goal
- Central Michigan - Nicholl 27-yard field goal
- San Jose State - Canley 59-yard run (Martini pass to Blackmon)
- San Jose State - Canley 5-yard run (Bowen PAT)
- San Jose State - Canley 5-yard pass from Martini (Bowen PAT)
- Central Michigan - Ealy 48-yard pass from Bender (Nicholl PAT)
- Central Michigan - Ealy 17-yard pass from Bender (Nicholl PAT)

San Jose State had 28 first downs to Central Michigan's 13, 200 rushing yards to their 63 and 442 passing yards to the Chippewas' 220. Both teams turned it over twice. San Jose State, despite having 12 penalties for 118 yards, had the ball for 37:11. Sheldon Canley rushed for 164 yards on 23 carries and five touchdowns.

== Aftermath ==
The Chippewas did not win the MAC title again until 1994, where they advanced to the successor to the California Bowl, the Las Vegas Bowl against UNLV. They did not win a bowl game until 2006. San Jose State were co-champions of the Big West with Fresno State, but the Bulldogs were invited to play. They did not return to a bowl game again until 2006. They did not win a conference championship again until 2020.
