= 1992 Akron Zips football team =

American college football season

1992 Akron Zips football
- Conference: Mid-American Conference
- Record: 7–3–1 (5–3 MAC)
- Head coach: Gerry Faust (7th season)
- Defensive coordinator: Bob Junko (5th season)
- Home stadium: Rubber Bowl

1992 Mid-American Conference football standings
	Conf.					Overall
Team	W		L		T	W		L		T
Bowling Green $	8	–	0	–	0	10	–	2	–	0
Western Michigan	6	–	3	–	0	7	–	3	–	1
Toledo	5	–	3	–	0	8	–	3	–	0
Akron	5	–	3	–	0	7	–	3	–	1
Miami (OH)	5	–	3	–	0	6	–	4	–	1
Ball State	5	–	4	–	0	5	–	6	–	0
Central Michigan	4	–	5	–	0	5	–	6	–	0
Kent State	2	–	7	–	0	2	–	9	–	0
Eastern Michigan	1	–	7	–	0	1	–	10	–	0
Ohio	1	–	7	–	0	1	–	10	–	0
$ – Conference champion

The 1992 Akron Zips football team represented Akron University as a member of the Mid-American Conference (MAC) the 1992 NCAA Division I-A football season, Led by seventh-year head coach Gerry Faust, the Zips compiled an overall record of 7–3–1 with a mark of 5–3 in conference play, placing in a three-way tie for third in the MAC. Akron played home games at the Rubber Bowl in Akron, Ohio.

== Schedule ==
Date	Opponent	Site	Result	Attendance	Source
September 5	at Eastern Michigan	Rynearson Stadium; Ypsilanti, Michigan	W 27–9	20,211	
September 12	Toledo	Rubber Bowl; Akron, OH	W 23–20	24,736	
September 19	at Western Michigan	Waldo Stadium; Kalamazoo, MI	L 20–24		
October 3	at Ohio	Peden Stadium; Athens, OH	W 13–0	10,318	
October 10	at Kent State	Dix Stadium; Kent, OH (Wagon Wheel)	L 16–20	12,237	
October 17	at Ball State	Ball State Stadium; Muncie, IN	W 22–14	7,224	
October 24	Bowling Green	Rubber Bowl; Akron, OH	L 3–24	10,107	
October 31	Central Michigan	Rubber Bowl; Akron, OH	W 31–28	4,760	
November 7	Temple*	Rubber Bowl; Akron, OH	W 29–15	4,430	
November 14	No. 7 (I-AA) Youngstown State*	Rubber Bowl; Akron, OH (Steel Tire)	T 10–10	,912	
November 21	at Cincinnati*	Nippert Stadium; Cincinnati, OH	W 24–22	7,738	
*Non-conference game; Rankings from NCAA Division I-AA Football Committee Poll released prior to the game
