= 1990 Miami Redskins football team =

American college football season

1990 Miami Redskins football
- Conference: Mid-American Conference
- Record: 5–5–1 (4–3–1 MAC)
- Head coach: Randy Walker (1st season)
- Defensive coordinator: Tim Carras (1st season)
- Home stadium: Yager Stadium

1990 Mid-American Conference football standings
	Conf.					Overall
Team	W		L		T	W		L		T
Toledo +	7	–	1	–	0	9	–	2	–	0
Central Michigan +	7	–	1	–	0	8	–	3	–	1
Ball State	5	–	3	–	0	7	–	4	–	0
Western Michigan	5	–	3	–	0	7	–	4	–	0
Miami (OH)	4	–	3	–	1	5	–	5	–	1
Bowling Green	2	–	4	–	2	3	–	5	–	2
Eastern Michigan	2	–	6	–	0	2	–	9	–	0
Kent State	2	–	6	–	0	2	–	9	–	0
Ohio	0	–	7	–	1	1	–	9	–	1
+ – Conference co-champions

The 1990 Miami Redskins football team was an American football team that represented Miami University in the Mid-American Conference (MAC) during the 1990 NCAA Division I-A football season. In its first season under head coach Randy Walker, the team compiled a 5–5–1 record (4–3–1 against MAC opponents), finished in fifth place in the MAC, and were outscored by all opponents by a combined total of 225 to 200.

The team's statistical leaders included Jim Clement with 1,184 passing yards, Terry Carter with 858 rushing yards, and Milt Stegall with 590 receiving yards.

== Schedule ==
Date	Time	Opponent	Site	Result	Attendance	Source
September 1		at North Carolina*	Kenan Memorial Stadium; Chapel Hill, NC	L 0–34	47,500	
September 8	1:30 p.m.	Toledo	Yager Stadium; Oxford, OH	L 14–20	19,000	
September 15		at LSU*	Tiger Stadium; Baton Rouge, LA	L 7–35	63,237	
September 22		at Cincinnati*	Riverfront Stadium; Cincinnati, OH (rivalry)	W 16–12	9,794	
September 29		at Central Michigan	Kelly/Shorts Stadium; Mount Pleasant, MI	L 7–31	18,802	
October 6		Ball State	Yager Stadium; Oxford, OH	W 24–10	19,500	
October 13		at Ohio	Peden Stadium; Athens, OH (rivalry)	W 40–18	18,992	
October 27		at Bowling Green	Doyt Perry Stadium; Bowling Green, OH	T 10–10	11,228	
November 3		at Eastern Michigan	Yager Stadium; Oxford, OH	W 34–14	24,126	
November 10		Kent State	Yager Stadium; Oxford, OH	W 31–10	15,148	
November 17		at Western Michigan	Waldo Stadium; Kalamazoo, MI	L 17–31	7,774	
*Non-conference game; All times are in Eastern time

== Roster ==
1990 Miami Redskins football team roster
Players			Coaches
Offense: Pos. / # / Name / Class	Defense: Pos. / # / Name / Class	Special teams: Pos. / # / Name / Class	Head coach: Randy Walker; Coordinators/assistant coaches Tim Carras (Defensive Coordinator and Inside Linebackers) Jack Glowik (Defensive Line and Special Teams Coordinator) Terry Hoeppner (Defensive Secondary) Frank Kurth (Tackles and Tight Ends) Shawn Simms (Outside Linebackers) Sherman Smith (Running Backs) Shawn Watson (Wide Receivers and Recruiting Coordinator) Kevin Wilson (Guards and Centers) Legend: (C) Team captain; (S) Suspended; (I) Ineligible; Injured; Redshirt
