= 1990 Ohio Bobcats football team =

American college football season

1990 Ohio Bobcats football
- Conference: Mid-American Conference
- Record: 1–9–1 (0–7–1 MAC)
- Head coach: Tom Lichtenberg (1st season)
- Home stadium: Peden Stadium

1990 Mid-American Conference football standings
	Conf.					Overall
Team	W		L		T	W		L		T
Toledo +	7	–	1	–	0	9	–	2	–	0
Central Michigan +	7	–	1	–	0	8	–	3	–	1
Ball State	5	–	3	–	0	7	–	4	–	0
Western Michigan	5	–	3	–	0	7	–	4	–	0
Miami (OH)	4	–	3	–	1	5	–	5	–	1
Bowling Green	2	–	4	–	2	3	–	5	–	2
Eastern Michigan	2	–	6	–	0	2	–	9	–	0
Kent State	2	–	6	–	0	2	–	9	–	0
Ohio	0	–	7	–	1	1	–	9	–	1
+ – Conference co-champions

The 1990 Ohio Bobcats football team was an American football team that represented Ohio University in the Mid-American Conference (MAC) during the 1990 NCAA Division I-A football season. In their first season under head coach Tom Lichtenberg, the Bobcats compiled a 1–9–1 record (0–7–1 against MAC opponents), finished in last place in the MAC, and were outscored by all opponents by a combined total of 342 to 162. They played their home games in Peden Stadium in Athens, Ohio.

== Schedule ==
Date	Time	Opponent	Site	Result	Attendance	Source
September 1	1:30 p.m.	at No. 18 Pittsburgh*	Pitt Stadium; Pittsburgh, PA	L 3–35	38,575	
September 15		at Eastern Michigan	Rynearson Stadium; Ypsilanti, MI	L 18–21		
September 22		Tennessee Tech*	Peden Stadium; Athens, OH	W 42–32	14,666	
September 29	1:30 p.m.	Toledo	Peden Stadium; Athens, OH	L 20–27	15,828	
October 6		at Bowling Green	Doyt Perry Stadium; Bowling Green, OH	T 10–10	22,342	
October 13		Miami (OH)	Peden Stadium; Athens, OH (rivalry)	L 18–40	18,992	
October 20		at Kent State	Dix Stadium; Kent, OH	L 15–44	12,000	
October 27		Western Michigan	Peden Stadium; Athens, OH	L 23–31	18,115	
November 3		at No. 5 (I-AA) Youngstown State*	Stambaugh Stadium; Youngstown, OH	L 0–27		
November 10		Central Michigan	Peden Stadium; Athens, OH	L 7–52		
November 17		at Ball State	Ball State Stadium; Muncie, IN	L 6–23	9,482	
*Non-conference game; Rankings from AP Poll released prior to the game; All times are in Eastern time
