= 1992 Kent State Golden Flashes football team =

American college football season

1992 Kent State Golden Flashes football
- Conference: Mid-American Conference
- Record: 2–9 (2–7 MAC)
- Head coach: Pete Cordelli (2nd season)
- Home stadium: Dix Stadium

1992 Mid-American Conference football standings
	Conf.					Overall
Team	W		L		T	W		L		T
Bowling Green $	8	–	0	–	0	10	–	2	–	0
Western Michigan	6	–	3	–	0	7	–	3	–	1
Toledo	5	–	3	–	0	8	–	3	–	0
Akron	5	–	3	–	0	7	–	3	–	1
Miami (OH)	5	–	3	–	0	6	–	4	–	1
Ball State	5	–	4	–	0	5	–	6	–	0
Central Michigan	4	–	5	–	0	5	–	6	–	0
Kent State	2	–	7	–	0	2	–	9	–	0
Eastern Michigan	1	–	7	–	0	1	–	10	–	0
Ohio	1	–	7	–	0	1	–	10	–	0
$ – Conference champion

The 1992 Kent State Golden Flashes football team was an American football team that represented Kent State University in the Mid-American Conference (MAC) during the 1992 NCAA Division I-A football season. In their second season under head coach Pete Cordelli, the Golden Flashes compiled a 2–9 record (2–7 against MAC opponents), finished in eighth place in the MAC, and were outscored by all opponents by a combined total of 301 to 133.

The team's statistical leaders included Troy Robinson with 422 rushing yards, Kevin Shuman with 1,518 passing yards, and Jimmie Woody with 714 receiving yards.

== Schedule ==
Date	Opponent	Site	Result	Attendance	Source
September 5	at Pittsburgh*	Pitt Stadium; Pittsburgh, PA	L 10–51	31,284	
September 12	Ohio	Dix Stadium; Kent, OH	L 14–27		
September 19	Ball State	Dix Stadium; Kent, OH	L 6–10	4,473	
September 26	at Eastern Michigan	Rynearson Stadium; Ypsilanti, MI	W 17–14	13,200	
October 3	at Cincinnati*	Nippert Stadium; Cincinnati, OH	L 0–31	16,903	
October 10	Akron	Dix Stadium; Kent, OH (Wagon Wheel)	W 20–16	12,237	
October 17	at Central Michigan	Kelly/Shorts Stadium; Mount Pleasant, MI	L 0–35	18,612	
October 24	Western Michigan	Dix Stadium; Kent, OH	L 13–26	3,378	
October 31	at Toledo	Glass Bowl; Toledo, OH	L 17–32	19,959	
November 7	Bowling Green	Dix Stadium; Kent, OH (Anniversary Award)	L 22–28	5,916	
November 14	at Miami (OH)	Yager Stadium; Oxford, OH	L 14–31	8,991	
*Non-conference game
