= 1990 Bowling Green Falcons football team =

American college football season

1990 Bowling Green Falcons football
- Conference: Mid-American Conference
- Record: 3–5–2 (2–4–2 MAC)
- Head coach: Moe Ankney (5th season)
- Home stadium: Doyt Perry Stadium

1990 Mid-American Conference football standings
	Conf.					Overall
Team	W		L		T	W		L		T
Toledo +	7	–	1	–	0	9	–	2	–	0
Central Michigan +	7	–	1	–	0	8	–	3	–	1
Ball State	5	–	3	–	0	7	–	4	–	0
Western Michigan	5	–	3	–	0	7	–	4	–	0
Miami (OH)	4	–	3	–	1	5	–	5	–	1
Bowling Green	2	–	4	–	2	3	–	5	–	2
Eastern Michigan	2	–	6	–	0	2	–	9	–	0
Kent State	2	–	6	–	0	2	–	9	–	0
Ohio	0	–	7	–	1	1	–	9	–	1
+ – Conference co-champions

The 1990 Bowling Green Falcons football team was an American football team that represented Bowling Green State University in the Mid-American Conference (MAC) during the 1990 NCAA Division I-A football season. In their fifth and final season under head coach Moe Ankney, the Falcons compiled a 3–5–2 record (2–4–2 against MAC opponents), finished in sixth place in the MAC, and were outscored by all opponents by a combined total of 163 to 138.

The team's statistical leaders included Erik White with 1,386 passing yards, George Johnson with 427 rushing yards, and Mark Szlachcic with 582 receiving yards.

== Schedule ==
Date	Time	Opponent	Site	Result	Attendance	Source
September 2		at Cincinnati*	Riverfront Stadium; Cincinnati, OH	W 34–20	6,563	
September 8	7:00 p.m.	at Virginia Tech*	Lane Stadium; Blacksburg, VA	L 7–21	32,187	
September 22		at Central Michigan	Kelly/Shorts Stadium; Mount Pleasant, MI	L 0–17	18,695	
September 29		at Ball State	Ball State Stadium; Muncie, IN	L 6–16	15,121	
October 6		Ohio	Doyt Perry Stadium; Bowling Green, OH	T 10–10	22,342	
October 13	7:30 p.m.	at Toledo	Glass Bowl; Toledo, OH (rivalry)	L 13–19	29,761	
October 20		Eastern Michigan	Doyt Perry Stadium; Bowling Green, OH	W 25–15	16,477	
October 27		Miami (OH)	Doyt Perry Stadium; Bowling Green, OH	T 10–10	11,228	
November 3		at Kent State	Dix Stadium; Kent, OH (Anniversary Award)	W 20–16	6,000	
November 10		Western Michigan	Doyt Perry Stadium; Bowling Green, OH	L 13–19	14,342	
*Non-conference game; All times are in Eastern time
