= 1990 Central Michigan Chippewas football team =

American college football season

1990 Central Michigan Chippewas football

MAC co-champion

California Bowl, L 24–48 vs. San Jose State
- Conference: Mid-American Conference
- Record: 8–3–1 (7–1 MAC)
- Head coach: Herb Deromedi (13th season)
- MVP: Jeff Bender
- Home stadium: Kelly/Shorts Stadium

1990 Mid-American Conference football standings
	Conf.					Overall
Team	W		L		T	W		L		T
Toledo +	7	–	1	–	0	9	–	2	–	0
Central Michigan +	7	–	1	–	0	8	–	3	–	1
Ball State	5	–	3	–	0	7	–	4	–	0
Western Michigan	5	–	3	–	0	7	–	4	–	0
Miami (OH)	4	–	3	–	1	5	–	5	–	1
Bowling Green	2	–	4	–	2	3	–	5	–	2
Eastern Michigan	2	–	6	–	0	2	–	9	–	0
Kent State	2	–	6	–	0	2	–	9	–	0
Ohio	0	–	7	–	1	1	–	9	–	1
+ – Conference co-champions

The 1990 Central Michigan Chippewas football team represented Central Michigan University in the Mid-American Conference (MAC) during the 1990 NCAA Division I-A football season. In their 13th season under head coach Herb Deromedi, the Chippewas compiled an 8–3–1 record (7–1 against MAC opponents), tied with Toledo for the MAC championship, lost to San Jose State in the California Bowl, and outscored their opponents, 283 to 146. The team played its home games in Kelly/Shorts Stadium in Mount Pleasant, Michigan, with attendance of 121,270 in six home games.

Led by a strong defense, the team shut out Cincinnati (34–0), Bowling Green (17–0), and Kent State (42–0), and held nine of twelve opponents to fewer than 14 points. On September 22, 1990, the defensive unit set a school record, holding Bowling Green to only two first downs in a 17–0 victory. The following week, the defense set another school record with six interceptions in a 31–7 victory over the Miami Redskins. The team also set a school record with 83 punts forced over the course of the 1990 season.

The team's statistical leaders included quarterback Jeff Bender with 1,978 passing yards, tailback Billy Smith with 1,047 rushing yards, and flanker Ken Ealy with 916 receiving yards. Ealy's 916 receiving yards was a single season school record until 1996 when the record was broken by Reggie Allen. Bender received the team's most valuable player award and also received the MAC's Vern Smith Leadership Award and the MAC Offensive Player of the Year award. Eight Central Michigan players (WR Ken Ealy, OG Paul Jacobson, QB Jeff Bender, RB Billy Smith, DL J.J. Wierenga, ILB Rich Curtiss, DB David Johnson, and DB Ken Strong) received first-team All-MAC honors. Coach Deromedi received the MAC Coach of the Year award.

== Schedule ==
Date	Time	Opponent	Site	Result	Attendance	Source
September 1		at Kentucky*	Commonwealth Stadium; Lexington, KY	L 17–20	57,550	
September 8		Cincinnati*	Kelly/Shorts Stadium; Mount Pleasant, MI	W 34–0	17,126	
September 15		at Akron*	Rubber Bowl; Akron, OH	T 14–14	7,236	
September 22		Bowling Green	Kelly/Shorts Stadium; Mount Pleasant, MI	W 17–0	18,695	
September 29		Miami (OH)	Kelly/Shorts Stadium; Mount Pleasant, MI	W 31–7	18,802	
October 6		at Kent State	Dix Stadium; Kent, OH	W 42–0	10,500	
October 13		Western Michigan	Kelly/Shorts Stadium; Mount Pleasant, MI (rivalry)	W 20–13	27,510	
October 20	1:00 p.m.	Toledo	Kelly/Shorts Stadium; Mount Pleasant, MI	W 13–12	20,781	
October 27		at Eastern Michigan	Rynearson Stadium; Ypsilanti, MI (rivalry)	W 16–12	24,662	
November 3		Ball State	Kelly/Shorts Stadium; Mount Pleasant, MI	L 3–13	18,356	
November 10		at Ohio	Peden Stadium; Athens, OH	W 52–7		
December 8		vs. San Jose State*	Bulldog Stadium; Fresno, CA (California Bowl)	L 24–48	25,431	
*Non-conference game; All times are in Eastern time

== Roster ==
1990 Central Michigan Chippewas football team roster
Players
Coaches
Offense

Pos.	#	Name	Class
QB	8	Jeff Bender	Jr
FB	46	Joe Connolly	Sr
WR	2	Ken Ealy	Jr
RB	4	Kevin Floyd	Sr
RB	30	Joe Hood	Sr
G	66	Paul Jacobson	Jr
RB	44	Eric Johnson	Fr
TE	83	Eric Stockford	Sr
OT	74	James Wyatt	Jr
QB	17	Joe Youngblood	So

Defense

Pos.	#	Name	Class
LB	58	Doug Adler	Sr
CB	1	Oscar Ford	Jr
CB	26	Ben King	Jr
S	16	David Johnson	Sr
S	3	Gino Marchetti	Sr
LB	56	Trent Naumcheff	Fr
CB	5	Ken Strong	Sr
LB	42	Chris Thompson	Sr
DE	93	J. J. Wierenga	Sr
CB	15	James Williams	Sr

Special teams

Pos.	#	Name	Class
LS	59	Brett Naumcheff	Sr

Head coach

- Herb Deromedi

Coordinators/assistant coaches

Legend

- (C) Team captain
- (S) Suspended
- (I) Ineligible
- Injured
- Redshirt

== Team players in the NFL ==
Round	Pick	Player	Position	NFL team
11	289	J. J. Wierenga	Defensive end	Green Bay Packers
