= 1990 Ball State Cardinals football team =

American college football season

1990 Ball State Cardinals football
- Conference: Mid-American Conference
- Record: 7–4 (5–3 MAC)
- Head coach: Paul Schudel (6th season)
- Offensive coordinator: Bill Lynch (1st season)
- Home stadium: Ball State Stadium

1990 Mid-American Conference football standings
	Conf.					Overall
Team	W		L		T	W		L		T
Toledo +	7	–	1	–	0	9	–	2	–	0
Central Michigan +	7	–	1	–	0	8	–	3	–	1
Ball State	5	–	3	–	0	7	–	4	–	0
Western Michigan	5	–	3	–	0	7	–	4	–	0
Miami (OH)	4	–	3	–	1	5	–	5	–	1
Bowling Green	2	–	4	–	2	3	–	5	–	2
Eastern Michigan	2	–	6	–	0	2	–	9	–	0
Kent State	2	–	6	–	0	2	–	9	–	0
Ohio	0	–	7	–	1	1	–	9	–	1
+ – Conference co-champions

The 1990 Ball State Cardinals football team was an American football team that represented Ball State University in the Mid-American Conference (MAC) during the 1990 NCAA Division I-A football season. In its sixth season under head coach Paul Schudel, the team compiled a 7–4 record (5–3 against conference opponents) and finished in a tie for third place out of ten teams in the MAC. The team played its home games at Ball State Stadium in Muncie, Indiana.

The team's statistical leaders included Mike Neu with 1,004 passing yards, Bernie Parmalee with 1,010 rushing yards, Mike LeSure with 398 receiving yards, and Kenny Stucker with 66 points scored.

== Schedule ==
Date	Time	Opponent	Site	Result	Attendance	Source
September 8		at Illinois State*	Hancock Stadium; Normal, IL	W 13–3	11,497	
September 15	2:05 p.m.	at Wisconsin*	Camp Randall Stadium; Madison, WI	L 7–24	44,698	
September 22	2:30 p.m.	Toledo	Ball State Stadium; Muncie, IN	L 16–28	13,321	
September 29		Bowling Green	Ball State Stadium; Muncie, IN	W 16–6	15,121	
October 6		at Miami (OH)	Yager Stadium; Oxford, OH	L 10–24	19,500	
October 13		Kent State^{†}	Ball State Stadium; Muncie, IN	W 31–0	14,974	
October 20		at Western Michigan	Waldo Stadium; Kalamazoo, MI	L 13–14	18,061	
October 27		Indiana State*	Ball State Stadium; Muncie, IN (Blue Key Victory Bell)	W 42–0	11,419	
November 3		at Central Michigan	Kelly/Shorts Stadium; Mount Pleasant, MI	W 13–3	18,356	
November 10		at Eastern Michigan	Rynearson Stadium; Ypsilanti, MI	W 20–13		
November 17		Ohio	Ball State Stadium; Muncie, IN	W 23–6	9,482	
*Non-conference game; ^{†}Homecoming; All times are in Eastern time
