= 1990 Kent State Golden Flashes football team =

American college football season

1990 Kent State Golden Flashes football
- Conference: Mid-American Conference
- Record: 2–9 (2–6 MAC)
- Head coach: Dick Crum (3rd season)
- Home stadium: Dix Stadium

1990 Mid-American Conference football standings
	Conf.					Overall
Team	W		L		T	W		L		T
Toledo +	7	–	1	–	0	9	–	2	–	0
Central Michigan +	7	–	1	–	0	8	–	3	–	1
Ball State	5	–	3	–	0	7	–	4	–	0
Western Michigan	5	–	3	–	0	7	–	4	–	0
Miami (OH)	4	–	3	–	1	5	–	5	–	1
Bowling Green	2	–	4	–	2	3	–	5	–	2
Eastern Michigan	2	–	6	–	0	2	–	9	–	0
Kent State	2	–	6	–	0	2	–	9	–	0
Ohio	0	–	7	–	1	1	–	9	–	1
+ – Conference co-champions

The 1990 Kent State Golden Flashes football team was an American football team that represented Kent State University in the Mid-American Conference (MAC) during the 1990 NCAA Division I-A football season. In their third and final season under head coach Dick Crum, the Golden Flashes compiled a 2–9 record (2–6 against MAC opponents), finished in a tie for seventh place in the MAC, and were outscored by all opponents by a combined total of 328 to 177.

The team's statistical leaders included Marcus Haywood with 672 rushing yards, Joe Dalpra with 1,533 passing yards, and Shawn Barnes with 483 receiving yards.

== Schedule ==
Date	Time	Opponent	Site	Result	Attendance	Source
September 1	1:00 p.m.	at No. 25 West Virginia*	Mountaineer Field; Morgantown, West Virginia	L 24–35	52,346	
September 8		Akron*	Dix Stadium; Kent, OH (Wagon Wheel)	L 10–38	17,700	
September 22		at Western Michigan	Waldo Stadium; Kalamazoo, MI	L 10–37	13,106	
September 29		Cincinnati*	Dix Stadium; Kent, OH	L 24–27	12,000	
October 6		Central Michigan	Dix Stadium; Kent, OH	L 0–42	10,500	
October 13		at Ball State	Ball State Stadium; Muncie, IN	L 0–31	14,974	
October 20		Ohio	Dix Stadium; Kent, OH	W 44–15	12,000	
October 27	4:30 p.m.	at Toledo	Glass Bowl; Toledo, OH	L 14–28	21,670	
November 3		Bowling Green	Dix Stadium; Kent, OH (Anniversary Award)	L 16–20	6,000	
November 10		at Miami (OH)	Yager Stadium; Oxford, OH	L 10–31	15,148	
November 17		Eastern Michigan	Dix Stadium; Kent, OH	W 25–24		
*Non-conference game; Rankings from AP Poll released prior to the game; All times are in Eastern time
