= 1992 Ball State Cardinals football team =

American college football season

1992 Ball State Cardinals football
- Conference: Mid-American Conference
- Record: 5–6 (5–4 MAC)
- Head coach: Paul Schudel (8th season)
- Offensive coordinator: Bill Lynch (3rd season)
- Defensive coordinator: Tim Burke (1st season)
- Home stadium: Ball State Stadium

1992 Mid-American Conference football standings
	Conf.					Overall
Team	W		L		T	W		L		T
Bowling Green $	8	–	0	–	0	10	–	2	–	0
Western Michigan	6	–	3	–	0	7	–	3	–	1
Toledo	5	–	3	–	0	8	–	3	–	0
Akron	5	–	3	–	0	7	–	3	–	1
Miami (OH)	5	–	3	–	0	6	–	4	–	1
Ball State	5	–	4	–	0	5	–	6	–	0
Central Michigan	4	–	5	–	0	5	–	6	–	0
Kent State	2	–	7	–	0	2	–	9	–	0
Eastern Michigan	1	–	7	–	0	1	–	10	–	0
Ohio	1	–	7	–	0	1	–	10	–	0
$ – Conference champion

The 1992 Ball State Cardinals football team was an American football team that represented Ball State University in the Mid-American Conference (MAC) during the 1992 NCAA Division I-A football season. In its eighth season under head coach Paul Schudel, the team compiled a 5–6 record (5–4 against conference opponents) and finished in sixth place out of ten teams in the MAC. The team played its home games at Ball State Stadium in Muncie, Indiana.

The team's statistical leaders included Mike Neu with 1,628 passing yards, Corey Croom with 1,157 rushing yards, Brian Oliver with 423 receiving yards, and Mark Swart with 45 points scored.

== Schedule ==
Date	Opponent	Site	Result	Attendance	Source
September 5	at No. 13 Clemson*	Memorial Stadium; Clemson, SC	L 10–24	69,077	
September 12	at Kansas*	Memorial Stadium; Lawrence, KS	L 10–62	38,500	
September 19	at Kent State	Dix Stadium; Kent, OH	W 10–6	4,473	
September 26	Miami (OH)	Ball State Stadium; Muncie, IN	W 19–9		
October 3	at Western Michigan	Waldo Stadium; Kalamazoo, MI	L 14–21		
October 10	Eastern Michigan	Ball State Stadium; Muncie, IN	W 31–7		
October 17	Akron	Ball State Stadium; Muncie, IN	L 14–22	7,224	
October 24	Central Michigan	Ball State Stadium; Muncie, IN	W 24–23		
October 31	at Ohio	Peden Stadium; Athens, OH	W 24–21		
November 7	Toledo	Ball State Stadium; Muncie, IN	L 9–10	5,218	
November 14	at Bowling Green	Doyt Perry Stadium; Bowling Green, OH	L 6–38	13,487	
*Non-conference game; Rankings from AP Poll released prior to the game
