= 1992 Western Michigan Broncos football team =

American college football season

1992 Western Michigan Broncos football
- Conference: Mid-American Conference
- Record: 7–3–1 (6–3 MAC)
- Head coach: Al Molde (6th season)
- Offensive coordinator: Rob Kuhlman
- Defensive coordinator: Larry Edlund
- MVP: Paul Hutchins
- Home stadium: Waldo Stadium

1992 Mid-American Conference football standings
| | Conf. | | | | | Overall |
| Team | W | | L | | T | W | | L | | T |
|---|---|---|---|---|---|---|---|---|---|---|
| Bowling Green $ | 8 | – | 0 | – | 0 | 10 | – | 2 | – | 0 |
| Western Michigan | 6 | – | 3 | – | 0 | 7 | – | 3 | – | 1 |
| Toledo | 5 | – | 3 | – | 0 | 8 | – | 3 | – | 0 |
| Akron | 5 | – | 3 | – | 0 | 7 | – | 3 | – | 1 |
| Miami (OH) | 5 | – | 3 | – | 0 | 6 | – | 4 | – | 1 |
| Ball State | 5 | – | 4 | – | 0 | 5 | – | 6 | – | 0 |
| Central Michigan | 4 | – | 5 | – | 0 | 5 | – | 6 | – | 0 |
| Kent State | 2 | – | 7 | – | 0 | 2 | – | 9 | – | 0 |
| Eastern Michigan | 1 | – | 7 | – | 0 | 1 | – | 10 | – | 0 |
| Ohio | 1 | – | 7 | – | 0 | 1 | – | 10 | – | 0 |
$ – Conference champion

The 1992 Western Michigan Broncos football team represented Western Michigan University in the Mid-American Conference (MAC) during the 1992 NCAA Division I-A football season. In their sixth season under head coach Al Molde, the Broncos compiled a 7–3–1 record (6–3 against MAC opponents), finished in second place in the MAC, and outscored their opponents, 197 to 177. The team played its home games at Waldo Stadium in Kalamazoo, Michigan.

The team's statistical leaders included Brad Tayles with 2,462 passing yards, Jim Vackaro with 893 rushing yards, and Ulric King with 732 receiving yards.

== Schedule ==
| Date | Opponent | Site | Result | Attendance | Source |
|---|---|---|---|---|---|
| September 3 | at Bowling Green | Doyt Perry Stadium; Bowling Green, OH | L 19–29 | 17,824 | |
| September 12 | at TCU* | Amon G. Carter Stadium; Fort Worth, TX | T 17–17 | 24,889 | |
| September 19 | Akron | Waldo Stadium; Kalamazoo, MI | W 24–20 | | |
| September 26 | at Ohio | Peden Stadium; Athens, OH | W 19–3 | 12,555 | |
| October 3 | Ball State | Waldo Stadium; Kalamazoo, MI | W 27–14 | | |
| October 10 | at Toledo | Glass Bowl; Toledo, OH | L 12–21 | | |
| October 17 | Eastern Michigan | Waldo Stadium; Kalamazoo, MI | W 20–19 | | |
| October 24 | at Kent State | Dix Stadium; Kent, OH | W 26–13 | 3,378 | |
| October 31 | Northern Illinois* | Waldo Stadium; Kalamazoo, MI | W 13–7 | 14,125 | |
| November 7 | at Miami (OH) | Yager Stadium; Oxford, OH | L 7–20 | 21,757 | |
| November 14 | Central Michigan | Waldo Stadium; Kalamazoo, MI (rivalry) | W 19–14 | 16,352 | |
*Non-conference game
