= Pete Cordelli =

American football coach (born 1953)

Biographical details
- Born: September 14, 1953 (age 73)

Coaching career (HC unless noted)
- 1977–1978: Arkansas (GA)
- 1979: TCU (QB)
- 1980–1981: Memphis State (RB/WR)
- 1983: Arkansas (WR)
- 1984–1985: Minnesota (WR/TE)
- 1986–1990: Notre Dame (QB/WR)
- 1991–1993: Kent State
- 2002–2003: Western Michigan (RB / assistant ST)
- 2014–2015: Rhodes (WR)

Administrative career (AD unless noted)
- 1982–1983: Dallas Cowboys (scout)
- 1994–1995: Cleveland Browns (scout)

Head coaching record
- Overall: 3–30

Pete Cordelli Jr. (born September 14, 1953) is an American former football coach and scout. He served as the head football coach at Kent State University from 1991 to 1993, compiling a record of 3–30. Cordelli served as an assistant coach under Lou Holtz at the University of Arkansas, the University of Minnesota, and the University of Notre Dame. He was a member of the staff on Holtz's 1988 Notre Dame team, which won a national championship. Cordelli was considered for the head football coaching position at the University of Toledo in December 1989. The job went to Nick Saban.

Cordelli began calling Arkansas State Red Wolves football broadcasts with Roger Twibell on ESPN+ in 2018.

== Head coaching record ==
=== College ===
Year	Team	Overall	Conference	Standing	Bowl/playoffs
Kent State Golden Flashes (Mid-American Conference) (1991–1993)
1991	Kent State	1–10	1–7	9th	
1992	Kent State	2–9	2–7	8th	
1993	Kent State	0–11	0–9	10th	
Kent State:		3–30	3–23		
Total:		3–30			
