= Jack Stovall =

American football player and coach

Biographical details
- Born: 1930 or 1931 (age 94–95)

Playing career
- 1956: Michigan
- Position: Halfback

Coaching career (HC unless noted)
- 1957: Delaware (assistant)
- 1958: Hartland HS (MI)
- 1959–1960: Ann Arbor University HS (MI)
- 1961: Central Connecticut (assistant)
- 1962–1963: Central Connecticut

Head coaching record
- Overall: 3–15 (college)

Jack Stovall (born 1930 or 1931) is an American former football coach. He was the fifth head football coach at the Central Connecticut State University in New Britain, Connecticut, serving for two seasons, from 1962 to 1963, and compiling a record of 3–15.

== Head coaching record ==
=== College ===
Year	Team	Overall	Conference	Standing	Bowl/playoffs
Central Connecticut Blue Devils (NCAA College Division independent) (1962–1963)
1962	Central Connecticut	2–8			
1963	Central Connecticut	1–7			
Central Connecticut:		3–15			
Total:		3–15			
