= 1992 Ohio Bobcats football team =

American college football season

1992 Ohio Bobcats football
- Conference: Mid-American Conference
- Record: 1–10 (1–7 MAC)
- Head coach: Tom Lichtenberg (3rd season)
- Home stadium: Peden Stadium

1992 Mid-American Conference football standings
	Conf.					Overall
Team	W		L		T	W		L		T
Bowling Green $	8	–	0	–	0	10	–	2	–	0
Western Michigan	6	–	3	–	0	7	–	3	–	1
Toledo	5	–	3	–	0	8	–	3	–	0
Akron	5	–	3	–	0	7	–	3	–	1
Miami (OH)	5	–	3	–	0	6	–	4	–	1
Ball State	5	–	4	–	0	5	–	6	–	0
Central Michigan	4	–	5	–	0	5	–	6	–	0
Kent State	2	–	7	–	0	2	–	9	–	0
Eastern Michigan	1	–	7	–	0	1	–	10	–	0
Ohio	1	–	7	–	0	1	–	10	–	0
$ – Conference champion

The 1992 Ohio Bobcats football team was an American football team that represented Ohio University in the Mid-American Conference (MAC) during the 1992 NCAA Division I-A football season. In their third season under head coach Tom Lichtenberg, the Bobcats compiled a 1–10 record (1–7 against MAC opponents), finished in a tie for last place in the MAC, and were outscored by all opponents by a combined total of 253 to 145. They played their home games in Peden Stadium in Athens, Ohio.

== Schedule ==
Date	Opponent	Site	Result	Attendance	Source
September 5	at Iowa State*	Cyclone Stadium; Ames, IA	L 9–35	32,127	
September 12	at Kent State	Dix Stadium; Kent, OH	W 27–14		
September 19	at Central Michigan	Kelly/Shorts Stadium; Mount Pleasant, MI	L 0–24	18,356	
September 26	Western Michigan	Peden Stadium; Athens, OH	L 3–19	12,555	
October 3	Akron	Peden Stadium; Athens, OH	L 0–13	10,318	
October 10	at Bowling Green	Doyt Perry Stadium; Bowling Green, OH	L 14–31	15,903	
October 17	Miami (OH)	Peden Stadium; Athens, OH (rivalry)	L 21–23	20,551	
October 24	at Eastern Michigan	Rynearson Stadium; Ypsilanti, MI	L 6–7	12,000	
October 31	Ball State	Peden Stadium; Athens, OH	L 21–24		
November 7	No. 9 (I-AA) Youngstown State*	Peden Stadium; Athens, OH	L 20–28	8,882	
November 14	at Colorado State*	Hughes Stadium; Fort Collins, CO	L 24–35	15,590	
*Non-conference game; Rankings from Coaches' Poll released prior to the game
