= Jerry Evans =

American football player (born 1968)

No. 88
- Position: Tight end

Personal information
- Born: September 28, 1968 (age 58); Lorain, Ohio, U.S.
- Listed height: 6 ft 4 in (1.93 m)
- Listed weight: 250 lb (113 kg)

Career information
- High school: Admiral King (Lorain)
- College: Toledo
- NFL draft: 1991: 8th round, 204th overall pick

Career history
- Phoenix Cardinals (1991)*; Green Bay Packers (1991–1992)*; Barcelona Dragons (1992); Denver Broncos (1993–1995)
- * Offseason or practice squad member only

Career NFL statistics
- Receptions: 25
- Receiving yards: 251
- Touchdowns: 3
- Stats at Pro Football Reference

Gerald Kristin Evans (born September 28, 1968) is an American former professional football player who was a tight end for the Denver Broncos of the National Football League (NFL). He played college football for the Toledo Rockets. He was selected by the Phoenix Cardinals in the eighth round of the 1991 NFL draft with the 204th overall pick. He played for the Broncos from 1993 to 1995.
