= Byron High School (Byron, Michigan) =

Location
- 312 W. Maple Avenue; Byron, Michigan; United States
- Coordinates: 42°49′35″N 83°57′00″W

Information
- Type: Public
- School district: Byron Area Schools
- NCES School ID: 260753004329
- Principal: Jason Beverly
- Staff: 12.50 (on FTE basis)
- Grades: 9 to 12
- Enrollment: 200 (2024-2025)
- Student to teacher ratio: 16.00
- Colors: Purple and gold
- Athletics conference: Mid-Michigan Activities
- Nickname: Eagles
- Website: Byron High School

Byron High School is a public high school located in Byron, Michigan. The school educates about 390 students in grades 9 to 12 and is part of Byron Area Schools.

Byron's mascot is the eagle.

== Notable alumni ==
- Erik Jones, NASCAR driver #20 Joe Gibbs
