= List of University of Wisconsin–Madison people in athletics =

The following is a list of people associated with the University of Wisconsin–Madison in the field of athletics.

== American football ==
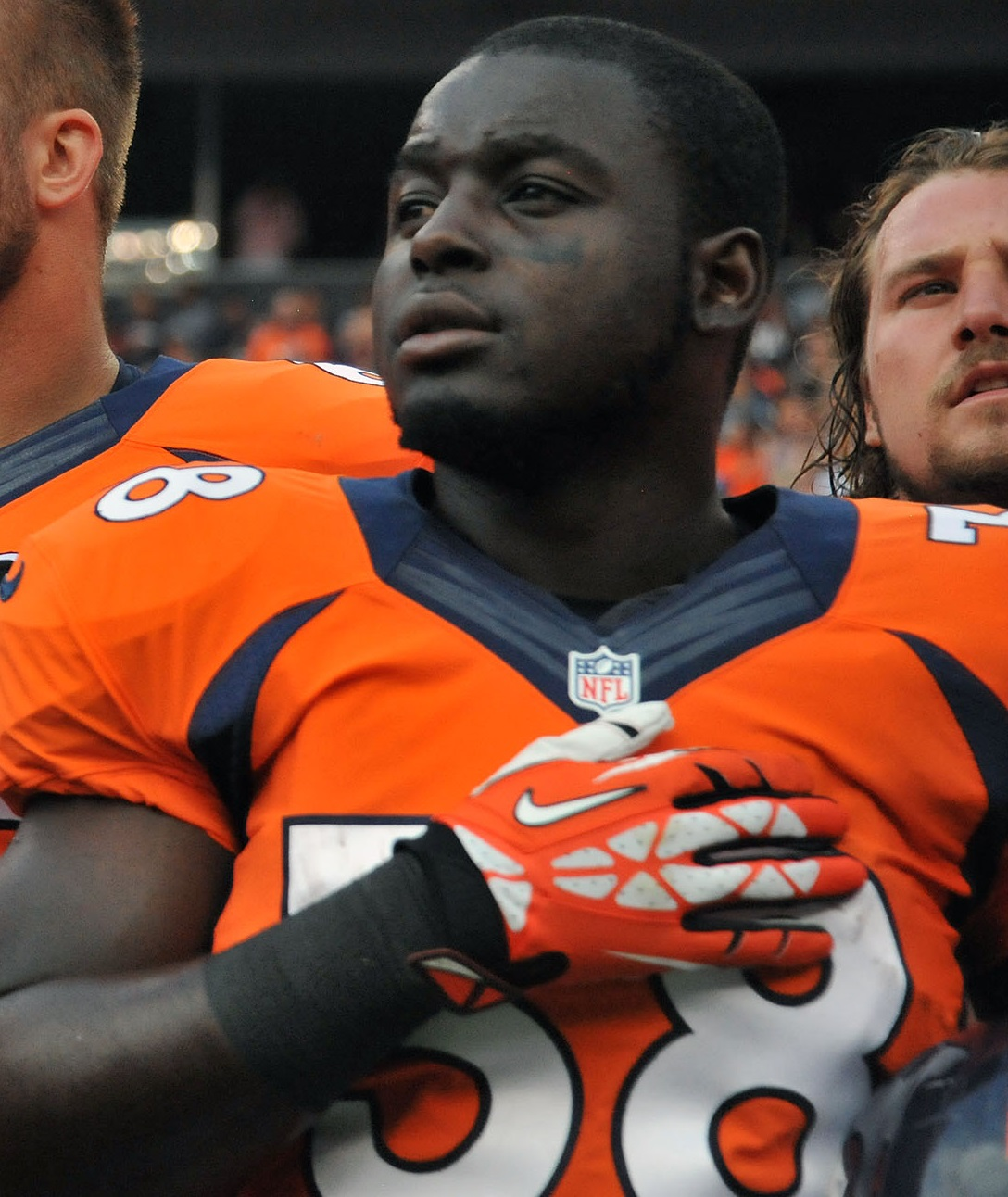
Montee Ball

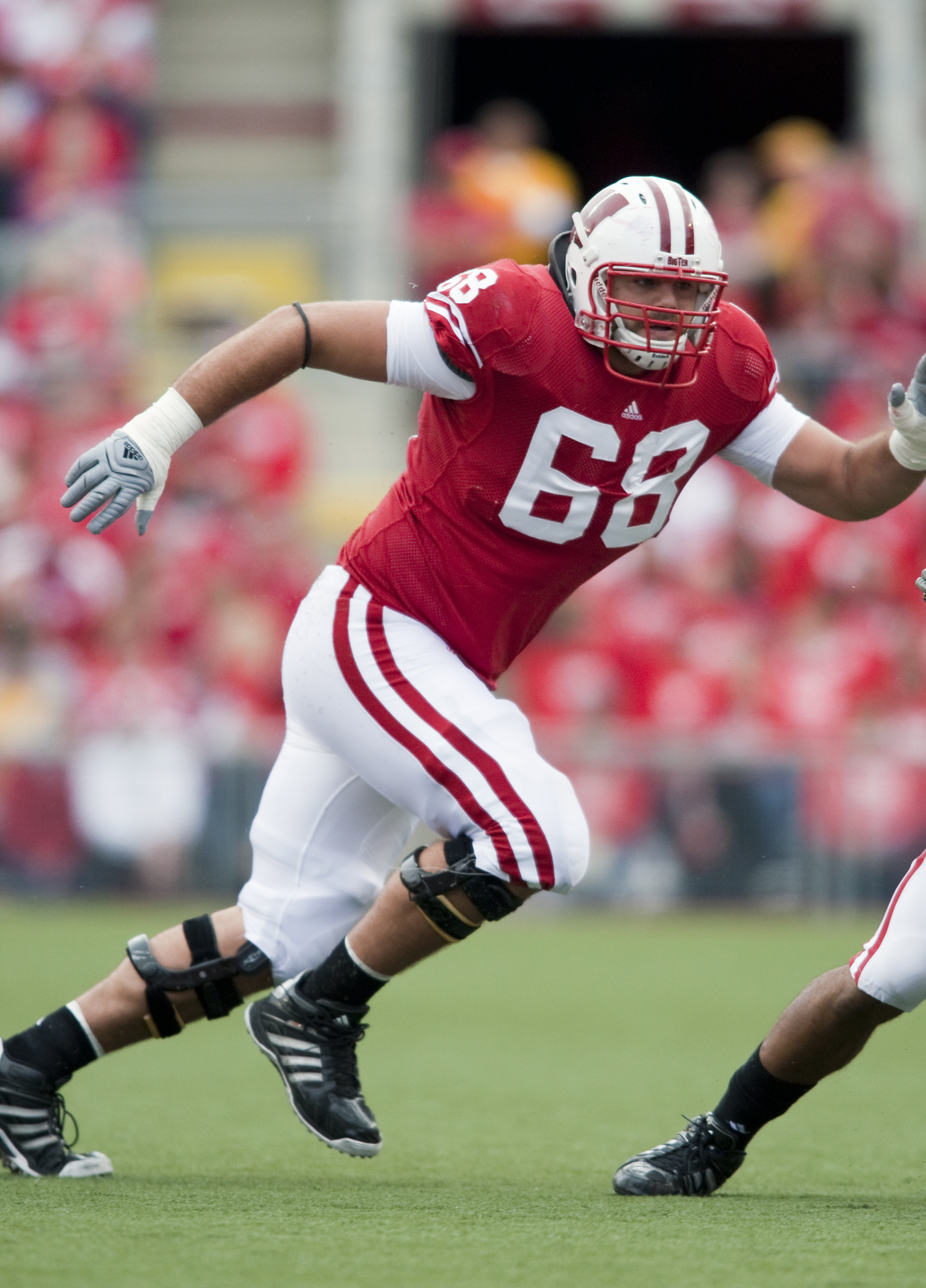
Gabe Carimi

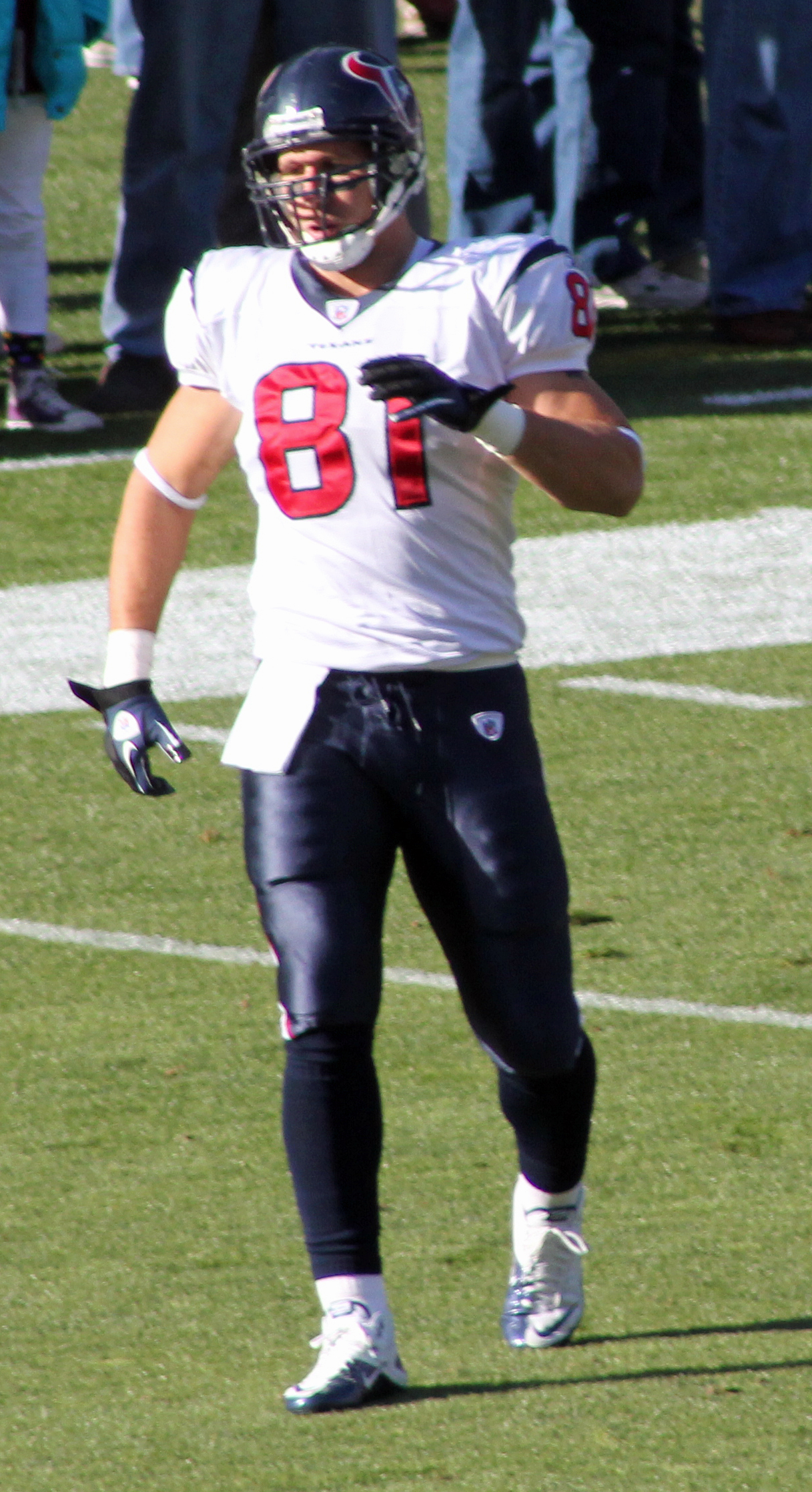
Owen Daniels

- Jared Abbrederis, NFL wide receiver, Green Bay Packers
- Dave Ahrens, retired NFL player
- Art Albrecht, former NFL player
- Bill Albright, retired NFL player, New York Giants
- Alan Ameche, 1954 Heisman Trophy winner, NFL player, Baltimore Colts
- Norm Amundsen, retired NFL player, Green Bay Packers
- Mark Anelli, NFL player
- Jim Bakken, retired NFL player, St. Louis Cardinals
- Tom Baldwin, NFL player, New York Jets
- Montee Ball, free agent NFL running back, Denver Broncos
- Shorty Barr, NFL player and head coach
- Travis Beckum, NFL player, New York Giants
- Ken Behring, former owner, Seattle Seahawks
- Chuck Belin, retired NFL player, Los Angeles/St. Louis Rams
- Marty Below, member of the College Football Hall of Fame
- Michael Bennett, NFL player, Oakland Raiders
- Scott Bergold, retired NFL player, St. Louis Cardinals
- Lee Bernet, retired professional football player, Denver Broncos
- Darrell Bevell, NFL assistant coach, Seattle Seahawks
- Erik Bickerstaff, NFL player
- Adolph Bieberstein, retired NFL player, Green Bay Packers and Racine Tornadoes
- Brooks Bollinger, retired NFL player, Dallas Cowboys
- Brian Bonner, retired NFL player, San Francisco 49ers and Washington Redskins
- Fred Borak, retired NFL player, Green Bay Packers
- Chris Borland, retired NFL linebacker, San Francisco 49ers
- Kyle Borland, retired NFL player, Los Angeles Rams
- Ken Bowman, retired NFL player and CFL assistant coach
- Donny Brady, retired NFL player, Cleveland Browns and Baltimore Ravens
- Gil Brandt, retired NFL executive, Dallas Cowboys
- Roman Brumm, retired NFL player
- Wendell Bryant, retired NFL player, Arizona Cardinals
- Cub Buck, retired NFL player and head coach of the Miami Hurricanes football team
- Dan Buenning, NFL player, Chicago Bears
- Tom Burke, retired NFL player, Arizona Cardinals
- Jason Burns, retired NFL player, Cincinnati Bengals
- George Burnside, retired NFL player, Racine Tornadoes
- Alfred L. Buser, All-American football player, former head football coach of the University of Florida
- Bob Butler, member of the College Football Hall of Fame
- Brian Calhoun, NFL player, Detroit Lions
- Len Calligaro, retired NFL player, New York Giants
- Lamar Campbell, retired NFL player, Detroit Lions
- Larry Canada, retired NFL player, Denver Broncos
- Gabe Carimi, NFL football player
- Harland Carl, retired NFL player, Chicago Bears
- Irv Carlson, retired NFL player, Kenosha Maroons
- Daryl Carter, retired NFL player, Chicago Bears
- Chad Cascadden, retired NFL player, New York Jets
- Jonathan Casillas, NFL player, New Orleans Saints
- John Cavosie, retired NFL player, Portsmouth Spartans
- Chris Chambers, NFL player, Kansas City Chiefs
- Geep Chryst, NFL assistant coach, San Francisco 49ers
- Paul Chryst, head coach, University of Wisconsin, Madison
- John Clay, NFL player, Pittsburgh Steelers
- John Coatta, former NFL scout, Dallas Cowboys and Seattle Seahawks
- Eddie Cochems, father of the forward pass
- Dave Costa, retired NFL player, San Francisco 49ers
- Ken Criter, retired NFL player, Denver Broncos
- Marcus Cromartie, NFL cornerback, San Francisco 49ers
- Owen Daniels, NFL player, Baltimore, Ravens
- Boob Darling, retired NFL player, Green Bay Packers
- Don Davey, retired NFL player, Green Bay Packers and Jacksonville Jaguars
- Anthony Davis, professional football player
- Nick Davis, retired NFL player, Minnesota Vikings
- Ralph Davis, retired NFL player, Green Bay Packers
- Joe Dawkins, retired NFL player
- Ron Dayne, 1999 Heisman Trophy winner, retired NFL player, Houston Texans
- Jim DeLisle, retired NFL player, Green Bay Packers
- Jeff Dellenbach, retired NFL player
- Lee DeRamus, retired NFL player, New Orleans Saints
- Glenn Derby, retired NFL player, New Orleans Saints
- John Dittrich, retired NFL player, Chicago Cardinals and Green Bay Packers
- Jerry Doerger, retired NFL player, Chicago Bears and San Diego Chargers
- Jason Doering, NFL player, drafted by Indianapolis Colts, played for Washington Redskins
- Tom Domres, retired NFL player, Houston Oilers and Denver Broncos
- Wally Dreyer, retired NFL player, Chicago Bears and Green Bay Packers; former head coach of the University of Wisconsin–Milwaukee Panthers football team
- Bob Eckl, retired NFL player, Chicago Cardinals
- Ron Egloff, retired NFL player, Denver Broncos and San Diego Chargers
- Gary Ellerson, retired NFL player, Green Bay Packers and Detroit Lions
- Al Elliott, retired NFL player, Racine Legion
- Tony Elliott, retired NFL player, New Orleans Saints
- Larry Emery, retired NFL player, Atlanta Falcons
- Derek Engler, retired NFL player, New York Giants
- Clarence Esser, retired NFL player, Chicago Cardinals
- Lee Evans, NFL player, Baltimore Ravens
- Tom Farris, retired NFL player, Chicago Bears
- Hal Faverty, retired NFL player, Green Bay Packers
- Gene Felker, retired NFL player, Dallas Texans
- Bill Ferrario, retired NFL player, Green Bay Packers
- Jamar Fletcher, NFL player, Cincinnati Bengals
- Terrell Fletcher, retired NFL player, San Diego Chargers
- Carlos Fowler, Arena Football League player
- Jim Fraser, retired NFL player, New Orleans Saints
- Travis Frederick, NFL player, Dallas Cowboys
- Jerry Frei, head coach of the Oregon Ducks football team, NFL assistant coach
- Kenny Gales, retired NFL player, Chicago Bears
- Milt Gantenbein, retired NFL player, Green Bay Packers
- Moose Gardner, retired NFL player
- Ed Garvey, former executive director, National Football League Players Association
- Aaron Gibson, retired NFL player, Detroit Lions, Dallas Cowboys and Chicago Bears
- Earl Girard, retired NFL player; Green Bay Packers, Detroit Lions, and Pittsburgh Steelers
- Charles Goldenberg, retired NFL All-Pro player, Green Bay Packers
- John Golemgeske, retired NFL player, Brooklyn Dodgers
- Rudy Gollomb, retired NFL player, Philadelphia Eagles
- Melvin Gordon, NFL player, Denver Broncos
- Rick Graf, retired NFL player
- Neil Graff, retired NFL player
- Garrett Graham, NFL player, Houston Texans
- David Greenwood, retired NFL player
- John P. Gregg, head coach of the LSU Tigers football team
- Bill Gregory, retired NFL player, Dallas Cowboys and Seattle Seahawks
- Nick Greisen, NFL player, Denver Broncos
- Ryan Groy, NFL offensive lineman, Buffalo Bills
- Paul Gruber, retired NFL player, Tampa Bay Buccaneers
- Dale Hackbart, retired NFL player
- Robert Halperin, Olympic (bronze) and Pan American Games (gold) yachting medalist, Wisconsin and Notre Dame and NFL football player, one of Chicago's most-decorated World War II heroes, and chairman of Commercial Light Co.
- Jim Haluska, retired NFL player, Chicago Bears
- Pat Harder, retired NFL player, Chicago Cardinals and Detroit Lions, member of the College Football Hall of Fame
- Jack Harris, retired NFL player, Green Bay Packers
- Ed Hartwell, NFL player
- Rob Havenstein, NFL offensive lineman, St. Louis Rams
- Anttaj Hawthorne, NFL player
- Nick Hayden, NFL player, Carolina Panthers and Dallas Cowboys
- Donald Hayes, retired NFL player, Carolina Panthers and New England Patriots
- Stan Heath, retired NFL player, Green Bay Packers
- George Hekkers, retired NFL player
- Arnie Herber, retired NFL player, Green Bay Packers and New York Giants, member of the Pro Football Hall of Fame
- P.J. Hill, Jr., NFL player, New Orleans Saints
- Elroy Hirsch, retired NFL player, member of the Pro Football Hall of Fame
- Jon Hohman, professional football player
- Harvey Holmes, head coach of the Utah Utes and Academy of Idaho Bengals football teams and the USC Trojans football, track, and baseball teams
- Reggie Holt, retired NFL player, Green Bay Packers
- Tubby Howard, retired NFL player, Green Bay Packers
- Paul Hubbard, NFL player, Oakland Raiders
- Ken Huxhold, retired NFL player, Philadelphia Eagles
- Jack Ikegwuonu, NFL player, Philadelphia Eagles and convicted armed robber
- Erasmus James, NFL player, Washington Redskins
- Eddie Jankowski, retired NFL player, Green Bay Packers
- Jason Jefferson, NFL player, Atlanta Falcons
- Al Johnson, NFL player, New England Patriots
- Ben Johnson, retired NFL player
- Farnham Johnson, retired professional football player
- Lawrence Johnson, retired NFL player, Cleveland Browns and Buffalo Bills
- Richard Johnson, retired NFL player, Houston Oilers
- Jimmy Jones, retired NFL player, Chicago Bears
- John Jones, former NFL executive, Green Bay Packers
- Tim Jordan, retired NFL player, New England Patriots
- Dick Jorgensen, NFL official
- Bryan Jurewicz, former NFL player
- Greg Kabat, retired professional football player
- Matt Katula, NFL player, Baltimore Ravens
- Greg Kent, retired NFL player, Detroit Lions
- Don Kindt, retired NFL player, Chicago Bears
- Roger Knight, retired NFL player, New Orleans Saints
- Polly Koch, retired professional football player, Rock Island Independents
- Dave Kocourek, retired professional football player
- Ross Kolodziej NFL player, Arizona Cardinals
- Bob Konovsky, retired NFL player, Chicago Cardinals; member of the National Wrestling Hall of Fame and Museum
- Joe Kresky, retired NFL player
- Gary Kroner, retired professional football player
- Tim Krumrie, retired NFL player, Cincinnati Bengals; assistant coach, Kansas City Chiefs
- Ralph Kurek, retired NFL player, Chicago Bears
- Joe Kurth, retired NFL player, Green Bay Packers
- Bill Kuusisto, retired NFL player, Green Bay Packers
- Curly Lambeau, retired NFL player and head coach, co-founder of the Green Bay Packers, member of the Pro Football Hall of Fame
- Bob Landsee, retired NFL player, Philadelphia Eagles
- Dan Lanphear, retired professional football player, Houston Oilers
- Wes Leaper, retired NFL player, Green Bay Packers
- Jim Leonhard, NFL player, New York Jets
- Dave Levenick, retired NFL player, Atlanta Falcons
- DeAndre Levy, NFL player, Detroit Lions
- Alex Lewis, NFL player
- Dan Lewis, retired NFL player
- Dennis Lick, retired NFL player, Chicago Bears
- Bill Lobenstein, retired NFL player, Denver Broncos
- Dick Loepfe, retired NFL player, Chicago Cardinals
- Tony Lombardi, professional football coach
- Mike London, retired professional football player, San Diego Chargers
- Milo Lubratovich, retired NFL player, Brooklyn Dodgers
- Jason Maniecki, retired NFL player, Tampa Bay Buccaneers
- Von Mansfield, retired NFL player, Philadelphia Eagles and Green Bay Packers
- Chris Maragos, NFL player, Seattle Seahawks
- Cecil Martin, retired NFL player, Philadelphia Eagles and Tampa Bay Buccaneers
- Ira Matthews, retired NFL player, Oakland Raiders
- Earl Maves, retired NFL player, Detroit Lions
- Charles McCarthy, head coach of the Georgia Bulldogs football team
- Tom McCauley, retired NFL player, Atlanta Falcons
- Thad McFadden, retired NFL player, Buffalo Bills
- Chris McIntosh, retired NFL player, Seattle Seahawks
- Jack Mead, retired NFL player, New York Giants
- Taylor Mehlhaff, NFL player, Minnesota Vikings
- Ahmad Merritt, NFL player, New York Giants
- Paul Meyers, retired NFL player
- Larry Mialik, retired NFL player, Atlanta Falcons and San Diego Chargers
- James Melka, retired NFL player, Green Bay Packers
- Ron Miller, retired NFL player, Los Angeles Rams
- John Moffitt, free agent NFL offensive lineman
- Sankar Montoute, retired NFL player, Tampa Bay Buccaneers
- Pete Monty, retired NFL player, New York Giants and Minnesota Vikings
- Mike Morgan, retired NFL player, Chicago Bears
- Emmett Mortell, retired NFL player, Philadelphia Eagles
- Brent Moss, retired NFL player, St. Louis Rams
- Don Murry, retired NFL player, Racine Legion and Chicago Bears
- Bobby Myers, retired NFL player, Tennessee Titans
- Fred Negus, retired NFL player, Chicago Bears
- Jim Nettles, retired NFL player, Philadelphia Eagles and Los Angeles Rams
- Tom Neumann, retired professional football player, Boston Patriots
- Dave Noble, retired NFL player, Cleveland Bulldogs and Cleveland Panthers
- Brad Nortman, NFL player, Carolina Panthers
- Jack Novak, retired NFL player, Cincinnati Bengals and Tampa Bay Buccaneers
- Pat O'Dea, member of the College Football Hall of Fame
- Nate Odomes, retired NFL player
- Pat O'Donahue, retired NFL player, San Francisco 49ers and Green Bay Packers
- Jonathan Orr, retired NFL player, Tennessee Titans and Oakland Raiders
- Joe Panos, retired NFL player, Philadelphia Eagles and Buffalo Bills
- George Paskvan, retired NFL player, Green Bay Packers
- Phil Peterson, former NFL player, Brooklyn Dodgers
- Bob Pickens, retired NFL player, Chicago Bears
- Jason Pociask, NFL player, Seattle Seahawks
- Walter D. Powell, head coach of the Montana State Bobcats and Stanford Indians football and men's basketball teams
- Chris Pressley, NFL player, Tampa Bay Buccaneers Cincinnati Bengals
- Art Price, retired NFL player, Atlanta Falcons
- Jim Purnell, retired NFL player, Chicago Bears and Los Angeles Rams
- Casey Rabach, NFL player, Washington Redskins
- Cory Raymer, retired NFL player, Washington Redskins and San Diego Chargers
- Russ Rebholz, retired NFL player
- Michael Reid, retired NFL player, Atlanta Falcons
- Bill Rentmeester, professional football player
- Pat Richter, retired NFL player, Washington Redskins, member of the College Football Hall of Fame
- Michael Roan, retired NFL player, Tennessee Titans
- Chester J. Roberts, head coach of the Miami Redskins football and men's basketball teams
- Bradbury Robinson, first player to throw a forward pass in a football game
- Rafael Robinson, retired NFL player, Seattle Seahawks and Houston/Tennessee Oilers
- Roderick Rogers, NFL player
- Tubby Rohsenberger, retired NFL player, Evansville Crimson Giants
- Gene H. Rose, retired NFL player, Chicago Cardinals
- Levonne Rowan, retired NFL player
- Joe Rudolph, retired NFL player, Philadelphia Eagles and San Francisco 49ers
- Tarek Saleh, retired NFL player, Carolina Panthers and Cleveland Browns
- Bob Schmitz, retired NFL player and scout
- Mike Schneck, NFL player, Atlanta Falcons
- John Schneller, retired NFL player, Detroit Lions
- Joe Schobert, NFL player, Cleveland Browns
- O'Brien Schofield, NFL player, Atlanta Falcons
- Dave Schreiner, member of the College Football Hall of Fame
- Bill Schroeder, professional football player
- Karl Schuelke, retired NFL player, Pittsburgh Pirates
- Paul Schuette, retired NFL player
- Ralph Scott, NFL player and head coach
- Champ Seibold, retired NFL player, Green Bay Packers and Chicago Cardinals
- Mike Seifert, retired NFL player, Cleveland Browns
- Clarence Self, retired NFL player
- Matt Shaughnessy, retired NFL player, Oakland Raiders and Arizona Cardinals
- Matt Sheldon, NFL assistant coach
- Mark Shumate, retired NFL player, New York Jets and Green Bay Packers
- Carl Silvestri, retired NFL player, St. Louis Cardinals and Atlanta Falcons
- Tony Simmons, Canadian Football League (CFL) player (B.C. Lions); retired NFL player
- Eber Simpson, retired NFL player, St. Louis All-Stars
- Darryl Sims, retired NFL player, Pittsburgh Steelers and Cleveland Browns
- Len Smith, retired NFL player, Racine Legion
- Lovie Smith, NFL head coach, did not go to UW but coached linebackers for the Badgers in 1987
- Ron Smith, retired NFL player
- Ray Snell, retired NFL player
- Phil Sobocinski, retired NFL player, Atlanta Falcons
- Mike Solwold, retired NFL player
- Jim Sorgi, NFL player, New York Giants
- Dezmen Southward, NFL safety, Indianapolis Colts
- Jerry Stalcup, retired NFL player, Los Angeles Rams
- Paul Stanton, retired NHL player
- Ken Starch, retired NFL player, Green Bay Packers
- Scott Starks, NFL player, Jacksonville Jaguars
- Aaron Stecker, retired NFL player, Tampa Bay Buccaneers and New Orleans Saints
- Kevin Stemke, retired NFL player
- Terry Stieve, retired NFL player, New Orleans Saints and St. Louis Cardinals
- Ken Stills, retired NFL player, Green Bay Packers and Minnesota Vikings
- John Stocco, professional football player
- Tim Stracka, retired NFL player, Cleveland Browns
- Dave Suminski, retired NFL player, Chicago Cardinals and Washington Redskins
- Jason Suttle, retired NFL player, Denver Broncos and San Francisco 49ers
- Luke Swan, NFL player
- Mark Tauscher, retired NFL player, Green Bay Packers
- Gus Tebell, retired NFL player and head coach
- Jim Temp, retired NFL player, Green Bay Packers
- Deral Teteak, retired NFL player, Green Bay Packers
- Joe Thomas, NFL player, Cleveland Browns
- Donnel Thompson, retired NFL player, Pittsburgh Steelers and Indianapolis Colts
- Mike Thompson, retired NFL player
- Scott Tolzien, NFL player, Green Bay Packers
- Clarence Tommerson, retired NFL player, Pittsburgh Pirates
- Al Toon, retired NFL player, New York Jets
- Nick Toon, NFL wide receiver, St. Louis Rams
- B.J. Tucker, NFL player
- Mel Tucker, NFL head coach, Jacksonville Jaguars
- Dan Turk, retired NFL player
- Eric Unverzagt, retired NFL player, Seattle Seahawks
- Kraig Urbik, NFL player, Pittsburgh Steelers
- Eugene Van Gent head coach of the Missouri Tigers, Texas Longhorns, and Stanford Cardinal men's basketball and football teams
- Ron Vander Kelen, retired NFL player, Minnesota Vikings
- Mike Verstegen, retired NFL player, New Orleans Saints and St. Louis Rams
- Troy Vincent, NFL player, Buffalo Bills
- Evan Vogds, retired NFL player, Green Bay Packers
- Stu Voigt, retired NFL player, Minnesota Vikings
- John Waerig, retired NFL player, Detroit Lions
- Steve Wagner, retired NFL player, Green Bay Packers and Philadelphia Eagles
- Lloyd Wasserbach, retired professional football player, Chicago Rockets
- Derek Watt, retired NFL player, Los Angeles Chargers and Pittsburgh Steelers
- J. J. Watt, retired NFL player, Houston Texans and Arizona Cardinals
- T. J. Watt, NFL player, Pittsburgh Steelers
- Mike Webster, retired NFL player, member of the Pro Football Hall of Fame
- Howard Weiss, retired NFL player, Detroit Lions
- Jonathan Welsh, retired NFL player, Indianapolis Colts
- James White, NFL running back, New England Patriots
- John Wilce, head coach of the Ohio State Buckeyes football team, member of the College Football Hall of Fame
- Brandon Williams, NFL player, San Francisco 49ers
- John Williams, retired NFL player
- Rollie Williams, retired NFL player, Racine Legion
- Russell Wilson, NFL player, Seattle Seahawks
- Chuck Winfrey, retired NFL player, Minnesota Vikings and Pittsburgh Steelers
- George Winslow, retired NFL player, Cleveland Browns and New Orleans Saints
- Randy Wright, retired NFL player, Green Bay Packers
- Jerry Wunsch, retired NFL player, Tampa Bay Buccaneers and Seattle Seahawks
- Bob Zeman, former NFL assistant coach
- Robert Zuppke, head coach of the Illinois Fighting Illini football team, member of the College Football Hall of Fame

== Baseball ==
- Milt Bocek, former MLB player
- Cy Buker, retired MLB player, Brooklyn Dodgers
- Charlie Chech, former MLB player
- John DeMerit, retired MLB player, Milwaukee Braves and New York Mets
- Vern Geishert, retired MLB player, California Angels
- Elise Harney, former professional baseball player, Kenosha Comets and Fort Wayne Daisies
- Mike Hart, retired MLB player, Minnesota Twins and Baltimore Orioles
- Bert Husting, football and baseball teams, later a major leaguer (1900–02)
- Addie Joss, former MLB player, member of the National Baseball Hall of Fame
- Thornton Kipper, former MLB player, Philadelphia Phillies
- Harvey Kuenn, retired MLB player and manager
- Lyman Linde, former MLB player, Cleveland Indians
- Stu Locklin, retired MLB player, Cleveland Indians
- Rodney Myers, retired MLB player
- Jim O'Toole, retired MLB player
- Lance Painter, retired MLB player
- Clay Perry, former MLB player, Detroit Tigers
- Paul Quantrill, retired MLB player
- Hal Raether, retired MLB player, Philadelphia Athletics/Kansas City Athletics
- Rick Reichardt, retired MLB player
- Terry Ryan, former MLB General Manager, Minnesota Twins
- Bud Selig, Baseball Commissioner
- Wally Snell, former MLB player, Boston Red Sox
- John Sullivan, former MLB player, Washington Senators and St. Louis Browns
- Red Wilson, retired MLB player
- Lewis Wolff, co-owner of the Oakland Athletics and San Jose Earthquakes

== Basketball ==
- Sam Barry, head coach of the Iowa Hawkeyes men's basketball team and USC Trojans men's basketball, baseball, and football teams; member of the Naismith Memorial Basketball Hall of Fame
- Tom Black, retired NBA player, Seattle SuperSonics and Cincinnati Royals
- Cory Blackwell, retired NBA player, Seattle SuperSonics
- Ben Braun, head coach of the Rice Owls men's basketball team
- Brian Butch, former NBA player, Denver Nuggets
- Everett Case, head coach of the North Carolina State Wolfpack men's basketball team, member of the Basketball Hall of Fame
- Bill Chandler, head coach of the Iowa State Cyclones and Marquette Golden Eagles men's basketball teams
- Paul Cloyd, retired professional basketball player
- Bobby Cook, former NBA player, Sheboygan Red Skins
- Tom Davis, head coach of the Lafayette Leopards, Boston College Eagles, Stanford Cardinal, Iowa Hawkeyes, and the Drake Bulldogs men's basketball teams
- Sam Dekker, NBA player, Houston Rockets
- Duje Dukan, NBA player, Sacramento Kings
- Michael Finley, retired NBA player, San Antonio Spurs
- Harold E. Foster, member of the Naismith Memorial Basketball Hall of Fame
- Paul Grant, retired NBA player
- Claude Gregory, retired NBA player, Washington Bullets and Los Angeles Clippers
- Rashard Griffith, professional basketball player
- Devin Harris, NBA player, Dallas Mavericks
- Al Henry, retired NBA player, Philadelphia 76ers
- Doug Holcomb, former professional basketball player
- Kim Hughes, NBA head coach
- Trévon Hughes (born 1987), basketball player in the Israeli National League
- Frank Kaminsky, NBA player, Charlotte Hornets
- John Kotz, former professional basketball player
- Marcus Landry, free agent NBA player
- Walt Lautenbach, retired NBA player, Sheboygan Red Skins
- Jon Leuer, NBA player, Phoenix Suns
- Howard Moore, former head coach of the UIC Flames men's basketball team
- Tamara Moore, WNBA player
- Harold Olsen, member of the Naismith Memorial Basketball Hall of Fame
- Kirk Penney, former player for ALBA Berlin in basketball's Euroleague, former NBA player for L.A. Clippers and Minnesota Timberwolves, currently playing for the New Zealand Breakers
- Don Rehfeldt, retired NBA player, Baltimore Bullets and Milwaukee Hawks
- Scott Roth, retired NBA player, head coach of the Dominican Republic national team and the Bakersfield Jam
- Dick Schulz, retired NBA player
- Glen Selbo, retired NBA player, Sheboygan Red Skins
- Christian Steinmetz, Hall of Fame Basketball player
- Greg Stiemsma, free agent NBA player
- Jordan Taylor, 2nd Team All-American basketball player
- Alando Tucker, former NBA player
- Andy Van Vliet (born 1995), Belgian basketball player for Bnei Herzliya Basket in the Israeli Basketball Premier League
- Tracy Webster, assistant coach of the Kentucky Wildcats men's basketball team
- Mike Wilkinson, American professional basketball player in Russia with Khimki BC

== Ice hockey ==
- Sara Bauer, recipient of the Patty Kazmaier Award
- Marc Behrend, retired NHL player, Winnipeg Jets
- Dan Bjornlie, professional hockey player
- Mike Blaisdell, retired NHL player
- Rene Bourque, NHL player, Montreal Canadiens
- Alex Brooks, former NHL player

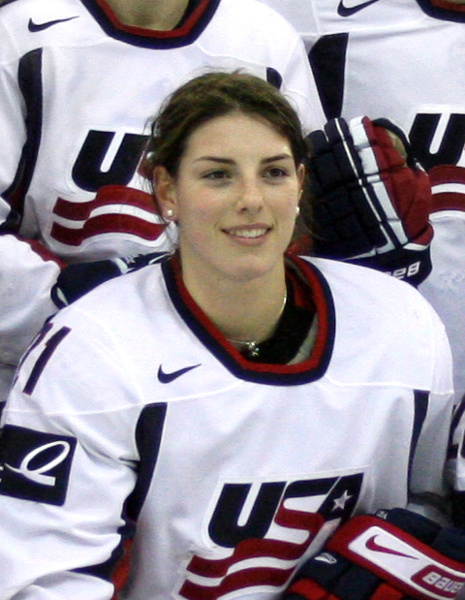
Hilary Knight

- Adam Burish, retired NHL player, Chicago Blackhawks, Dallas Stars, San Jose Sharks
- John Byce, retired NHL player, Boston Bruins
- Jim Carey, retired NHL player
- Chris Chelios, retired NHL player, Montreal Canadiens, Chicago Blackhawks, Detroit Red Wings, Atlanta Thrashers, 3-time Norris Trophy Winner
- Samantha Cogan (born 1997), ice hockey forward for PWHL Toronto
- Brianna Decker, member of the United States women's national ice hockey team, recipient of the Patty Kazmaier Award
- Tracey DeKeyser, ice hockey coach
- Jake Dowell, NHL player, Dallas Stars
- Davis Drewiske, NHL player, Montreal Canadiens
- Bruce Driver, retired NHL player, New Jersey Devils and New York Rangers
- Meghan Duggan, member of the United States women's national ice hockey team, recipient of the Patty Kazmaier Award

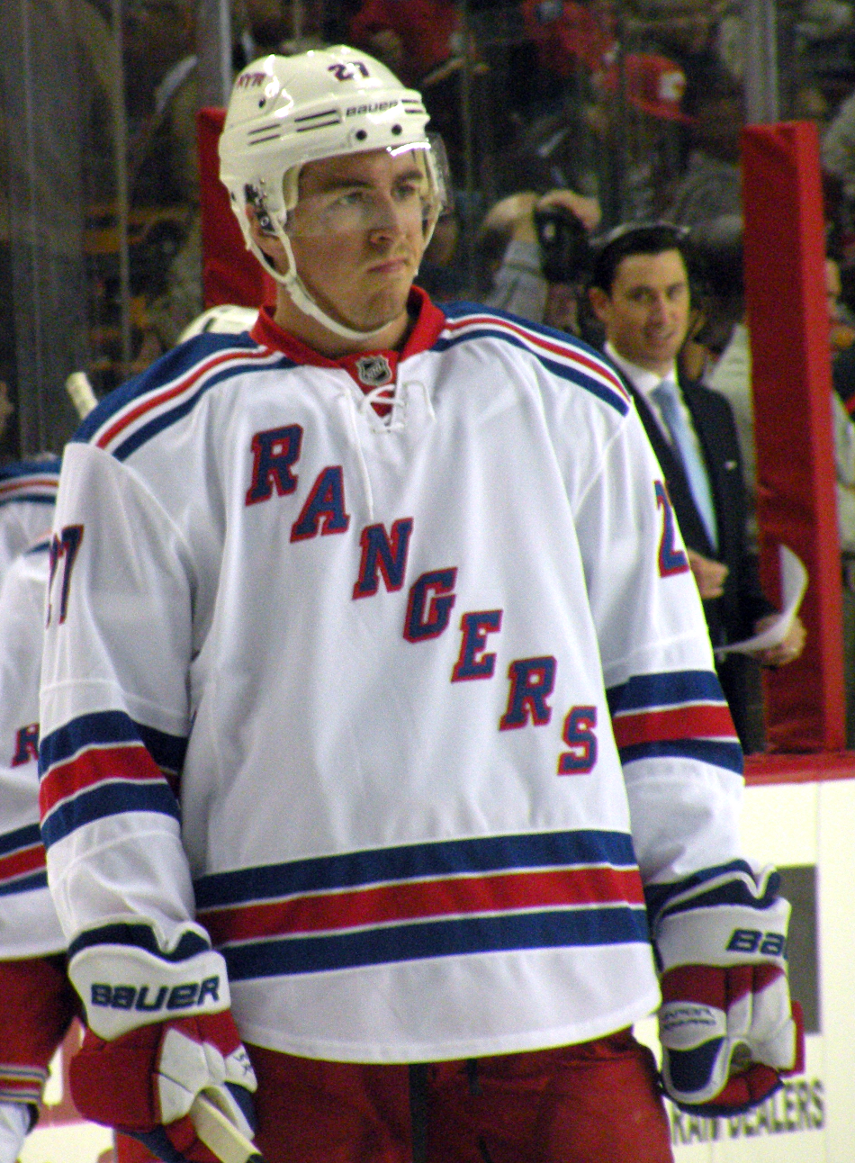
Ryan McDonagh

- Robbie Earl, former NHL player
- Mike Eaves, retired NHL player, Minnesota North Stars, Calgary Flames; head coach, University of Wisconsin men's ice hockey
- Mickey Elick, professional hockey player

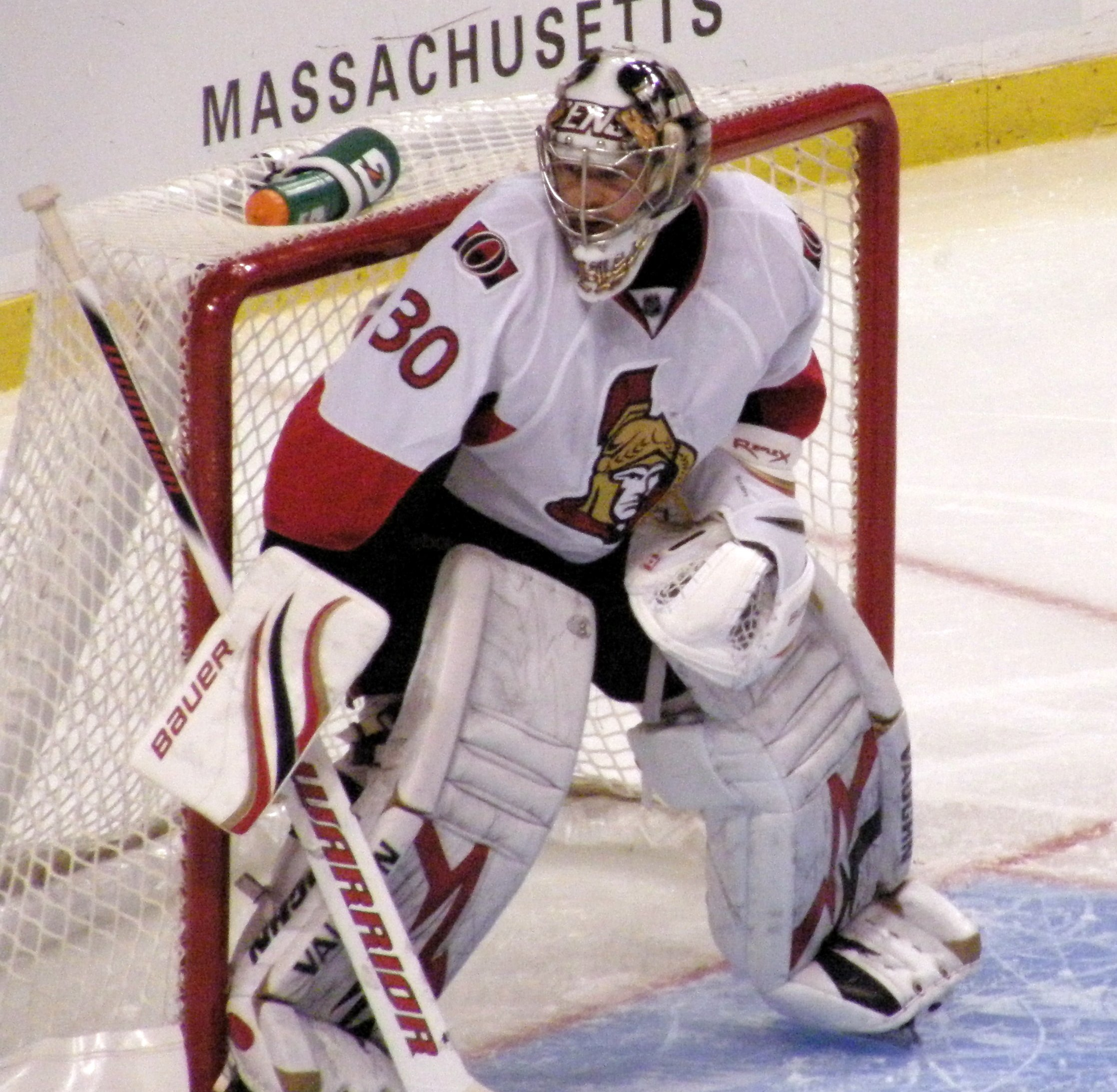
Brian Elliott

- Brian Elliott, NHL player, St. Louis Blues
- Molly Engstrom, ice hockey player, Olympic medalist
- Kelly Fairchild, former NHL player
- Patrick Flatley, retired NHL player, New York Islanders
- Jackie Friesen, ice hockey coach
- Jake Gardiner, NHL player, Toronto Maple Leafs
- Tom Gilbert, NHL player, Edmonton Oilers
- Tony Granato, retired NHL player, San Jose Sharks, Los Angeles Kings, New York Rangers; assistant coach, Pittsburgh Penguins; winner, 1996 Bill Masterton Memorial Trophy
- George Gwozdecky, head coach of the Denver Pioneers men's ice hockey team
- Dany Heatley, NHL player, Minnesota Wild
- Sean Hill, retired NHL player, Minnesota Wild, New York Islanders, Florida Panthers, Carolina Hurricanes, St. Louis Blues, Ottawa Senators, Anaheim Ducks, and Montreal Canadiens
- Matt Hussey, NHL player
- Jim Johannson, professional ice hockey player and coach, USA Hockey executive
- John Johannson, retired NHL player, New Jersey Devils
- Mark Johnson, National Collegiate Athletic Association (NCAA) women's ice hockey coach; retired NHL player, New Jersey Devils, St. Louis Blues, Hartford Whalers, Minnesota North Stars, Pittsburgh Penguins; member of 1980 Miracle on Ice gold medal Olympic team
- Peter Johnson, former NHL scout, Toronto Maple Leafs
- Curtis Joseph, retired NHL player, Toronto Maple Leafs, Calgary Flames, Phoenix Coyotes, Detroit Red Wings, Edmonton Oilers, and St. Louis Blues
- Hilary Knight, 2 time Olympic gold medalist, captain of the United States women's national ice hockey team, and captain of the Seattle Torrent of the Professional Women's Hockey League
- Luke Kunin, NHL player (Minnesota Wild)
- Erika Lawler, member of the 2009–10 United States national women's ice hockey team, Olympic medalist
- Doug MacDonald, retired NHL player, Buffalo Sabres
- Carla MacLeod, Olympic gold medalist, world champion ice hockey player
- Jackie MacMillan, ice hockey coach
- David Maley, retired NHL player
- Jamie McBain, NHL player, Carolina Hurricanes
- Ryan McDonagh, NHL player, Tampa Bay Lightning
- Scott Mellanby, retired NHL player, Atlanta Thrashers, St. Louis Blues, Florida Panthers, Edmonton Oilers, and Philadelphia Flyers
- Meaghan Mikkelson, member of the Canada women's national ice hockey team, Olympic gold medalist
- Brian Mullen, retired NHL player, New York Islanders, San Jose Sharks, New York Rangers, and Winnipeg Jets; current New York Rangers broadcaster
- Mark Osiecki, retired NHL player, head coach of the Ohio State Buckeyes men's ice hockey team
- Sis Paulsen, ice hockey and softball coach
- Joe Pavelski, NHL player, San Jose Sharks, 2010 Olympic Silver Medalist
- Joe Piskula, NHL player, Los Angeles Kings
- Dan Plante, retired NHL player, New York Islanders
- Victor Posa, retired NHL player, Chicago Blackhawks
- Brian Rafalski, retired NHL player, Detroit Red Wings, New Jersey Devils
- Paul Ranheim, retired NHL player
- Steve Reinprecht, former NHL player, Florida Panthers, Phoenix Coyotes, Calgary Flames, Colorado Avalanche, and Los Angeles Kings
- Barry Richter, NHL player
- Mike Richter, retired NHL player, New York Rangers
- Shaun Sabol, retired NHL player, Philadelphia Eagles
- Justin Schultz, NHL player, Washington Capitals.
- Steve Short, retired NHL player, Los Angeles Kings and Detroit Red Wings
- Gary Shuchuk, retired NHL player, Detroit Red Wings and Los Angeles Kings
- Jack Skille, NHL player, Florida Panthers
- Derek Stepan, NHL player, New York Rangers
- Bob Suter, retired NHL player, 1980 Olympics gold medalist who played in the Miracle on Icegame
- Gary Suter, retired NHL player, San Jose Sharks, Chicago Blackhawks, and Calgary Flames; Winner 1986 Calder Memorial Trophy
- Ryan Suter, NHL player, Nashville Predators, Minnesota Wild
- Dean Talafous, retired NHL player, Minnesota North Stars
- David Tanabe, retired NHL player
- Chris Tancill, retired NHL player
- Kyle Turris, drafted into NHL 3rd overall in 2007 NHL Draft Phoenix Coyotes
- Steve Tuttle, retired NHL player, St. Louis Blues and Tampa Bay Lightning
- Jessie Vetter, Olympic athlete, world champion hockey player
- Kerry Weiland, ice hockey defenceman, Olympic athlete
- Brad Winchester, NHL player, San Jose Sharks
- Andy Wozniewski, former NHL player, Boston Bruins, St. Louis Blues, and Toronto Maple Leafs
- Jinelle Zaugg-Siergiej, member of the 2009–10 United States national women's ice hockey team, Olympic medalist
- Jason Zent, retired NHL player, Ottawa Senators and Philadelphia Flyers

== Soccer ==
- Wes Hart, retired MLS player, Colorado Rapids and San Jose Earthquakes
- Aaron Hohlbein, MLS player, Kansas City Wizards
- Marci Jobson, head coach of Baylor Bears women's soccer team
- Rose Lavelle, USWNT and NWSL player, NJ/NY Gotham FC
- Chris Mueller, MLS player, Orlando City SC
- Natalie Viggiano, NWSL player, OL Reign

== Other ==
- Simon Bairu, professional runner
- Cindy Bremser, Olympic athlete, Pan American Games medalist
- Bebe Bryans, former coach of the United States Women's National Rowing crew and current head coach in women's rowing at the University of Wisconsin–Madison
- Maureen Clark, curler, Olympian
- Mary Docter, former speed skater, Olympic athlete
- Suzy Favor-Hamilton, former middle-distance runner, Olympian
- Ryan Fox, US National Team rower
- Carie Graves, Olympic gold medalist, head coach of the Harvard Crimson and Texas Longhorns women's crew teams
- Dennis Hall, world champion wrestler, Olympic medalist, Pan American Gamesgold medalist
- Matt Hanutke, Wisconsin Hall of Fame wrestler, four-time college All-American
- Eric Heiden, Olympic five-time gold medalist, eight-time world champion, founding member of the 7-Eleven Cycling Team
- Russell Hellickson, Olympic medalist, Pan American Games gold medalist
- Phil Hellmuth, professional poker player, has captured a record 16 World Series of Poker bracelets
- Beau Hoopman, Olympic rowing gold medalist
- Dan Immerfall, Olympic medalist, head referee for the International Skating Union, member of the National Speedskating Hall of Fame
- Evan Jager, distance runner, Olympic medalist, current American record holder in the 3000m steeplechase
- Nicole Joraanstad, national champion curler
- Gwen Jorgensen, Olympic gold medalist, professional triathlete
- Bill Kazmaier, former world champion powerlifter, world champion strongman and professional wrestler, won three World's Strongest Man titles
- Carl Kiekhaefer, NASCAR team owner, member of the Motorsports Hall of Fame of America, former owner of Mercury Marine
- Alvin Kraenzlein, Olympic gold medalist
- D. Wayne Lukas, U.S. Racing Hall of Fame and American Quarter Horse Hall of Fame trainer
- Mike Manley, retired middle- and long-distance runner, Olympic athlete, Pan American Gamesgold medalist
- Buddy Melges, America's Cup skipper
- F. Don Miller, executive director of the US Olympic Committee
- Bob Mionske, former Olympic and professional bicycle racer
- Hans J. Mueh, director of Athletics at the United States Air Force Academy
- Eric Mueller, former Olympic and National team rower, Olympic medalist
- Chuck Neinas, Big Eight Conference and Big 12 Conference commissioner
- Carly Piper, swimmer, gold medalist and world record holder in the 2004 Summer Olympic Games
- George Poage, athlete, first African American Olympic medal winner
- Andrew Rein, former wrestler, Olympic medalist
- Chris Solinsky, professional distance runner
- Matt Tegenkamp, professional distance runner
- Nick Thompson, Badger wrestler from 2000 to 2002; mixed martial artist
- Jack Waite, retired professional tennis player
- Evan Wick, wrestler
- Jackie Zoch, rower, Olympic medalist

== See also ==
- Wisconsin Badgers
- List of University of Wisconsin–Madison people
