= 1993 Wisconsin Badgers football team =

American college football season

1993 Wisconsin Badgers football

Big Ten co-champion Rose Bowl champion

Rose Bowl, W 21–16 vs. UCLA
- Conference: Big Ten Conference

Ranking
- Coaches: No. 5
- AP: No. 6
- Record: 10–1–1 (6–1–1 Big Ten)
- Head coach: Barry Alvarez (4th season)
- Offensive coordinator: Brad Childress (2nd season)
- Offensive scheme: Pro-style
- Defensive coordinator: Dan McCarney (4th season)
- Base defense: 3–4
- MVP: Brent Moss
- Captains: Joe Panos; Lamark Shackerford
- Home stadium: Camp Randall Stadium

1993 Big Ten Conference football standings
	Conf.					Overall
Team	W		L		T	W		L		T
No. 6 Wisconsin +	6	–	1	–	1	10	–	1	–	1
No. 11 Ohio State +	6	–	1	–	1	10	–	1	–	1
No. 8 Penn State	6	–	2	–	0	10	–	2	–	0
Indiana	5	–	3	–	0	8	–	4	–	0
No. 21 Michigan	5	–	3	–	0	8	–	4	–	0
Illinois	5	–	3	–	0	5	–	6	–	0
Michigan State	4	–	4	–	0	6	–	6	–	0
Iowa	3	–	5	–	0	6	–	6	–	0
Minnesota	3	–	5	–	0	4	–	7	–	0
Northwestern	0	–	8	–	0	2	–	9	–	0
Purdue	0	–	8	–	0	1	–	10	–	0
+ – Conference co-champions; Rankings from AP Poll

The 1993 Wisconsin Badgers football team was an American football team that represented the University of Wisconsin–Madison as a member of the Big Ten Conference during the 1993 NCAA Division I-A football season. In their fourth year under head coach Barry Alvarez, the Badgers compiled a 10–1–1 record (6–1–1 in conference games), tied with Ohio State for the Big Ten championship, and outscored opponents by a total of 333 to 179. They defeated UCLA in the Rose Bowl and were ranked No. 6 and No. 5, respectively, in the final AP and Coaches polls. It was Wisconsin's highest finish in the polls since the 1962 team was ranked No. 2.

Despite a strong start to the season, team co-captain Joe Panos was asked by a reporter whether he thought Michigan or Ohio State would win the conference, to which Panos sharply responded, "Well, why not Wisconsin?" The team and its fans used the rally cry of "Why Not Wisconsin?" for the rest of the season. The Badgers won their first six games and then lost to unranked Minnesota for their first and only loss of the season. The following week, Wisconsin defeated Michigan for the first time since 1981, a highlight that was marred by the "Camp Randall Crush" in which 73 students were injured (six critically) as fans stormed the field. The Badgers tied No. 3 Ohio State and concluded the regular season with a victory over Michigan State in the Coca-Cola Classic in Tokyo.

Running back Brent Moss tallied 1,637 rushing yards, scored 96 points, and won the Chicago Tribune Silver Football as the Big Ten's most valuable player. Quarterback Darrell Bevell passed for 2,390 yards with a 67.8% completion percentage and a passer efficiency rating of 155.2. Wide receiver Lee DeRamus led the team with 54 receptions for 920 yards. Alvarez won the Bobby Dodd Coach of the Year Award.

The team played its home games at Camp Randall Stadium in Madison, Wisconsin.

== Schedule ==
Date	Time	Opponent	Rank	Site	TV	Result	Attendance	Source
September 4	1:05 p.m.	Nevada*		Camp Randall Stadium; Madison, WI		W 35–17	66,557	
September 11	7:00 p.m.	at SMU*		Ownby Stadium; Dallas, TX		W 24–16	19,013	
September 18	1:05 p.m.	Iowa State*	No. 24	Camp Randall Stadium; Madison, WI		W 28–7	77,745	
September 25	11:30 a.m.	at Indiana	No. 23	Memorial Stadium; Bloomington, IN	ESPN	W 27–15	34,306	
October 9	1:05 p.m.	Northwestern^{†}	No. 21	Camp Randall Stadium; Madison, WI		W 53–14	77,745	
October 16	11:30 a.m.	at Purdue	No. 16	Ross–Ade Stadium; West Lafayette, IN	ESPN	W 42–28	37,112	
October 23	6:00 p.m.	at Minnesota	No. 15	Hubert H. Humphrey Metrodome; Minneapolis, MN (rivalry)		L 21–28	64,798	
October 30	11:35 a.m.	No. 24 Michigan	No. 21	Camp Randall Stadium; Madison, WI	ESPN	W 13–10	77,745	
November 6	2:30 p.m.	No. 3 Ohio State	No. 15	Camp Randall Stadium; Madison, WI	ABC	T 14–14	77,745	
November 20	2:30 p.m.	at Illinois	No. 14	Memorial Stadium; Champaign, IL	ABC	W 35–10	48,083	
December 5	9:00 p.m.	vs. No. 25 Michigan State	No. 10	Tokyo Dome; Tokyo, Japan (Coca-Cola Classic)	ESPN	W 41–20	51,500	
January 1, 1994	4:00 p.m.	vs. No. 13 UCLA*	No. 9	Rose Bowl; Pasadena, CA (Rose Bowl)	ABC	W 21–16	101,237	
*Non-conference game; ^{†}Homecoming; Rankings from AP Poll released prior to the game; All times are in Central time

== Rankings ==
Ranking movements Legend: ██ Increase in ranking ██ Decrease in ranking RV = Received votes
	Week																
Poll	Pre	1	2	3	4	5	6	7	8	9	10	11	12	13	14	15	Final
AP	RV	RV	RV	24	23	22	21	16	15	21	15	14	12	10	10	9	6
Coaches Poll	RV	RV	RV	25	22	20	19	16	12	20	14	13	11	8	7	7	5

== Game summaries ==
=== Nevada ===
Nevada at Wisconsin

Team	1	2	3	4	Total
Nevada	0	3	0	14	17
• Wisconsin	14	0	14	7	35

- Date: September 4
- Location: Camp Randall Stadium, Madison, WI
- Game attendance: 66,557

Wisconsin opened the season on September 4 with a 35–17 victory over Nevada before a crowd of 66,577 at Camp Randall Stadium in Madison, Wisconsin. Sophomore quarterback Darrell Bevell completed 19 of 27 passes for 263 yards to seven different receivers. He also set a Wisconsin single-game record with five touchdown passes. The Badgers intercepted four Nevada passes in the first half.

=== SMU ===
Wisconsin at SMU

Team	1	2	3	4	Total
• Wisconsin	0	0	10	14	24
SMU	3	10	3	0	16

- Date: September 11
- Location: Ownby Stadium, Dallas
- Game attendance: 19,013

On September 11, Wisconsin defeated SMU, 24–16, before a crowd of 19,013 at Ownby Stadium in Dallas. The Badgers trailed, 13–0, at halftime, but rallied for 24 points in the second half. Wisconsin took a 17–16 lead at the 6:28 mark of the fourth quarter on a 25-yard touchdown pass from Darrell Bevell to J. C. Dawkins. The Badgers scored again late in the game on a one-yard touchdown run by Terrell Fletcher. Bevell completed 18 of 26 passes for 198 yards. Lee DeRamus caught seven passes for 112 yards. Brent Moss rushed for a career-high 181 yards on 27 carries. It was only the second road victory for Wisconsin since 1986.

=== Iowa State ===
Iowa State at Wisconsin

Team	1	2	3	4	Total
Iowa State	0	0	0	7	7
• Wisconsin	14	7	7	0	28

- Date: September 18
- Location: Camp Randall Stadium, Madison, WI
- Game attendance: 77,745

On September 18, Wisconsin defeated Iowa State, 28–7, before a sellout crowd of 77,745 at Camp Randall Stadium in Madison, Wisconsin. The Badgers tallied 252 rushing yards and 196 passing yards. Two Badgers rushed for over 100 yards: Terrell Fletcher with 124 yards and Brent Moss with 104 yards. Iowa State did not score until the end of the fourth quarter. Vic Feuerherd of the Wisconsin State Journal called it the Badgers' finest effort under Alvarez and their "best all-around game in a decade."

=== Indiana ===
Wisconsin at Indiana

Team	1	2	3	4	Total
• Wisconsin	13	7	0	7	27
Indiana	2	0	13	0	15

- Date: September 25
- Location: Memorial Stadium, Bloomington, IN
- Game attendance: 34,306

On September 25, Wisconsin defeated Indiana, 27–15, before a crowd of 34,306 at Memorial Stadium in Bloomington, Indiana. The Badgers took a 20–2 and held off an Indiana comeback attempt in the second half. The Badgers tallied 354 rushing yards, led by Brent Moss with a career-high 198 yards on 32 carries. Darrell Bevell completed five of 15 passes for 123 yards.

=== Northwestern ===
Northwestern at Wisconsin

Team	1	2	3	4	Total
Northwestern	0	14	0	0	14
• Wisconsin	7	20	19	7	53

- Date: October 9
- Location: Camp Randall Stadium, Madison, WI
- Game attendance: 77,745

On October 9, Wisconsin defeated Northwestern, 53–14, before a sellout crowd of 77,745 for homecoming at Camp Randall Stadium. Wisconsin scored on seven consecutive possessions and tallied 533 yards of total offense (315 rushing). Brent Moss rushed for 125 yards on 15 carries, and Terrell Fletcher tallied 106 yards on 22 carries. Darrell Bevell set a new Big Ten record for completion percentage (94.4%) by completing 17 of 18 passes for 207 yards.

=== Purdue ===
Wisconsin at Purdue

Team	1	2	3	4	Total
• Wisconsin	7	14	14	7	42
Purdue	0	0	7	21	28

- Date: October 16
- Location: Ross–Ade Stadium, West Lafayette, IN
- Game attendance: 37,129

On October 16, Wisconsin defeated Purdue, 42–28, before a crowd of 37,129 at Ross–Ade Stadium in West Lafayette, Indiana. The Badgers dominated the game early, leading by a 35–0 score after the first 34 minutes. Brent Moss rushed for 139 yards, and Darrell Bevell completed 15 of 20 passes for 204 yards. It was the first time a Wisconsin team had won its first six games since the 1912 team went 7–0. It also extended Wisconsin's winning streak to six games, the longest Wisconsin winning streak since the 1961 and 1962 teams strung together seven consecutive wins.

=== Minnesota ===
Wisconsin at Minnesota

Team	1	2	3	4	Total
Wisconsin	0	0	14	7	21
• Minnesota	7	14	0	7	28

- Date: October 23
- Location: Hubert H. Humphrey Metrodome, Minneapolis
- Game attendance: 64,798

On October 23, No. 15/12 Wisconsin lost its annual rivalry game to unranked Minnesota, 28–21, before a crowd of 64,798 at the Hubert H. Humphrey Metrodome in Minneapolis. The Gophers took a 21–0 lead at halftime. Darrell Bevell set a Wisconsin single-game record with 423 passing yards, completing 31 of 48 passes. He also threw five interceptions (including three in the fourth quarter). Brent Moss tallied 130 rushing yards on 27 carries. Lee DeRamus had nine receptions for 156 yards.

=== Michigan ===
Michigan at Wisconsin

Team	1	2	3	4	Total
Michigan	0	3	7	0	10
• Wisconsin	3	10	0	0	13

- Date: October 30
- Location: Camp Randall Stadium, Madison, WI
- Game attendance: 77,745

On October 30, No. 21 Wisconsin defeated No. 24 Michigan, 13–10, before a crowd of 77,745 at Camp Randall Stadium. The Badgers took a 13–3 lead at halftime on two field goals by Rick Schnetzky and a 12-yard touchdown run by Terrell Fletcher. Michigan's defense held Wisconsin scoreless in the second half, and a touchdown pass in the third quarter from Todd Collins to Derrick Alexander tightened the score to 13–10. Collins completed 21 of 31 passes for 248 yards.

It was the Badgers' first victory over the Wolverines since 1981. At the end of the game, Wisconsin fans stormed the field and were blocked by guardrails surrounding the field. The crowd in the back, not aware of what was going on at the front, continued to push forward, aided by gravity. Those in front were crushed against the rails and then trampled when the rails gave way and the throng spilled onto the field. There were no fatalities, but 73 students were injured, six of them critically.

=== Ohio State ===
Ohio State at Wisconsin

Team	1	2	3	4	Total
Ohio State	7	0	0	7	14
Wisconsin	0	7	7	0	14

- Date: November 6
- Location: Camp Randall Stadium, Madison, WI
- Game attendance: 77,745

On November 6, No. 15 and No. 3 Ohio State played to a 14–14 tie before a crowd of 77,745 at Camp Randall Stadium. The Badgers held a 14–7 lead at the start of the fourth quarter. The Buckeyes then drove 99 yards in 46 seconds, concluding with a touchdown reception by Joey Galloway to tie the score. Galloway had six receptions for 150 yards. The Badgers drove down the field and with one second remaining, Rich Schnetzky's potential game-winning field goal attempt was blocked by cornerback Marlon Kerner.

=== Illinois ===
Wisconsin at Illinois

Team	1	2	3	4	Total
• Wisconsin	7	14	7	7	35
Illinois	0	3	7	0	10

- Date: November 20
- Location: Memorial Stadium, Champaign, IL
- Game attendance: 48,083

On November 20, Wisconsin defeated Illinois, 35–10, before a crowd of 48,083 at Memorial Stadium in Champaign, Illinois. The Badgers gained 301 rushing yards against an Illini defense that had allowed only 96 yards per game and was ranked fourth nationally against the run. For the third time during the 1993 season, two Wisconsin backs rushed for over 100 yards: Terrell Fletcher with 139 and Brent Moss with 124. Darrell Bevell completed 17 of 22 passes for 222 yards and three touchdowns. Lee DeRamus had eight receptions for 125 yards.

=== Michigan State ===
Coca-Cola Classic

Team	1	2	3	4	Total
Michigan State	7	0	3	10	20
• Wisconsin	3	21	3	14	41

- Date: December 5
- Location: Tokyo Dome, Tokyo, Japan
- Game attendance: 51,500

On December 5, No. 10 Wisconsin defeated No. 25 Michigan State, 41–20, before a crowd of 51,500 in the Coca-Cola Classic at the Tokyo Dome in Tokyo, Japan. Wisconsin Governor Tommy Thompson joined the team in Tokyo. The Badgers scored three touchdowns in the second quarter and led, 24–7, at halftime. Brent Moss and Terrell Fletcher again rushed for over 100 yards each, tallying 146 and 112 yards, respectively. Darrell Bevell completed 14 of 19 passes for 235 yards. Lee DeRamus had five receptions for 95 yards, breaking Al Toon's single-season Michigan State receiving yardage record.

The victory clinched Wisconsin's spot in the 1994 Rose Bowl. In Madison, thousands of fans celebrated in the streets, damaging two police cars. Some 3,000 fans marched to Camp Randall Stadium where some tried to topple the goal posts. Police arrested 14 persons.

=== UCLA–Rose Bowl ===
1994 Rose Bowl

Team	1	2	3	4	Total
• Wisconsin	7	7	0	7	21
UCLA	3	0	0	13	16

- Date: January 1, 1995
- Location: Rose Bowl, Pasadena, CA
- Game attendance: 101,237

On January 1, 1994, No. 9 Wisconsin defeated No. 13 UCLA, 21–16, before a crowd of 101,237 in the 1994 Rose Bowl in Pasadena, California. Although the game was played in UCLA's home stadium, Wisconsin fans outnumbered UCLA fans by a wide margin. Wisconsin led, 14–3, at halftime on two short touchdown runs by Brent Moss. After a scoreless third quarter, UCLA scored two touchdowns on a 12-yard run by Ricky Davis and a five-yard pass from Wayne Cook to Mike Nguyen. Wisconsin quarterback put the game away with a 21-yard touchdown run. UCLA receiver J. J. Stokes set Rose Bowl records for receptions (14) and receiving yards (176). UCLA turned the ball over six times, including five lost fumbles. Brent Moss tallied 158 rushing yards on 36 carries in addition to his two touchdowns and was named the game's most valuable player.

== Personnel ==
=== Roster ===
1993 Wisconsin Badgers football team roster
Players
Coaches
Offense

Pos.	#	Name	Class
OL	77	Tyler Adam	Sr
OL	57	David Anderson	So
WR	25	Kerwin Badie	Fr
QB	11	Darrell Bevell	So
QB	3	Michael Brin	So
WR	12	Jevon Brunston	Fr
RB	20	Jason Burns	Jr
OL	68	Cayetano Castro	Fr
OL	63	James Darby	Fr
WR	1	J.C. Dawkins	Jr
WR	2	Lee DeRamus	Jr
OL	69	Derek Engler	Fr
RB	41	Terrell Fletcher	Jr
QB	15	Jeff Forde	Fr
OL	59	Mike Galletti	Fr
QB	17	Darren Holt	Fr
WR	21	Keith Jackson	Jr
RB	22	Ron Johnson	So
RB	34	Nikki Kemp	Jr
WR	18	Chris Kennedy	Jr
OL	79	Shane Kreke	So
WR	4	Michael London	Jr
TE	9	Kevin Lyles	Fr
QB	16	Jay Macias	Jr
QB	19	Ben McCormick	Fr
RB	13	Carl McCullough	Fr
RB	32	Mark Montgomery	Sr
RB	33	Brent Moss	Jr
RB	26	Robert Nelson	So
TE	31	Matt Nyquist	So
G	58	Joe Panos (C)	Sr
OL	51	Brian Patterson	Jr
OL	56	Mike Rader	Fr
C	52	Cory Raymer	Jr
TE	81	Michael Roan	Jr
RB	44	Royce Robertson	Fr
OL	72	John Rohde	Fr
G	63	Joe Rudolph	Jr
WR	84	Archie Seale	Fr
WR	82	Tony Simmons	Fr
QB	10	Dirk Stanger	Fr
OL	60	Steve Stark	So
WR	24	Reggie Torian	Fr
RB	45	Jeff Wirth	Sr
OT	71	Jerry Wunsch	Fr
OL	65	James Vanderveldt	Fr
OT	67	Mike Verstegen	Jr
WR	87	Vince Zullo	Jr

Defense

Pos.	#	Name	Class
WR	85	Steve Baffico	So
DB	23	Donny Brady	Jr
DB	5	Jamel Brown	Jr
LB	98	Yusef Burgess	Jr
DB	30	Theo Carney	Jr
DB	11	Mike Carr	Fr
DB	19	Daryl Carter	Fr
OLB	51	Chad Cascadden	Jr
LB	52	Phil Chavez	Jr
OLB	36	Azree Commander	Fr
DB	18	Dwayne Cuff	Fr
LB	39	Pete Diatelevi	Fr
LB	34	Brian Flanigan	Fr
DT	92	Carlos Fowler	Sr
CB	3	Kenny Gales	Jr
DL	96	Al Gay	Fr
LB	46	Terry Glavin	So
DB	27	Damon Glenn	Fr
OLB	63	Derek Greene	Fr
DB	22	Trent Gross	Fr
DL	95	Todd Halbur	Fr
DB	31	Troy Hegg	Fr
OLB	50	Chris Hein	Jr
DB	2	Eric Holder	Fr
S	10	Reggie Holt	Jr
DL	59	Joe Innis	Fr
LB	6	Royston Jones	So
OLB	85	Bryan Jurewicz	Fr
DB	4	Greg Keigher	Fr
DB	9	Dave Knaack	Fr
DL	67	Steve Kouba	So
DL	61	Lee Krueger	Sr
LB	53	Jason Levine	Sr
OLB	88	Rob Lurtsema	Fr
LB	56	David Lysek	Fr
DT	70	Jason Maniecki	So
CB	29	Jeff Messenger	Jr
LB	48	Pete Monty	Fr
S	37	Scott Nelson	Sr
LB	54	Todd Orlando	Sr
DB	32	Eric Pollex	So
LB	8	Sylas Pratt	Jr
OLB	93	Nick Rafko	Sr
DB	24	John Rhymes	Jr
DB	13	R.J. Safranek
OLB	42	Tarek Saleh	Fr
LB	56	Dan Schneck	Fr
DB	49	Henry Searcy	Sr
DL	62	Lamark Shackerford (C)	Sr
DL	90	Haywood Simmons	So
DB	38	Ronald Smith	Fr
DL	91	Rod Spiller	Fr
DB	28	Jason Suttle	Fr
DL	94	Rafael Tercarolli	Fr
DT	66	Mike Thompson	Jr
DL	75	John Todryk	Fr
LB	47	Eric Unverzagt	So
DB	20	Scott Wagner	Fr
DB	7	Cyril Weems	Fr
LB	55	Chad Yocum (injured)	Sr
DB	15	Scott Young	So

Special teams

Pos.	#	Name	Class
K	14	John Hall	Fr
K	97	Matt Krueger	Jr
K	23	Bryan Mader
K	90	Paul Sander	Fr
K	98	Rick Schnetzky	Fr
P	26	Sam Veit	Jr

Head coach

- Barry Alvarez

Coordinators/assistant coaches

- Brad Childress – Offensive coordinator/quarterbacks
- Dan McCarney – Defensive coordinator/defensive line
- Bill Callahan – Offensive line
- Kevin Cosgrove – Inside linebackers
- Jim Hueber – Running backs
- Tom McMahon – Defensive backs
- Jay Norvell – Wide receivers/Special Teams
- John Palermo – Assistant Head Coach/outside linebackers
- Bernie Wyatt – Tight ends
- Rob Ianello – Recruiting coordinator

Legend

- (C) Team captain
- (S) Suspended
- (I) Ineligible
- Injured
- Redshirt

=== Regular starters ===
Position	Player
Quarterback	Darrell Bevell
Running back	Brent Moss
Fullback	Mark Montgomery
Wide receiver	Lee DeRamus
Wide receiver	J. C. Dawkins
Tight end	Michael Roan
Left tackle	Mike Verstegen
Left guard	Joe Rudolph
Center	Cory Raymer
Right guard	Steve Stark
Right tackle	Joe Panos

Position	Player
Defensive tackle	Mike Thompson
Nose guard	Lamark Shackerford
Defensive tackle	Lee Krueger
Outside linebacker	Chris Hein
Inside linebacker	Eric Unverzagt
Inside linebacker	Yusef Burgess
Outside linebacker	Bryan Jurewicz
Cornerback	Kenny Gales
Strong safety	Reggie Holt
Free safety	Scott Nelson
Cornerback	Jeff Messenger

== Statistics ==
For the 1993 season (Rose Bowl included), the Badgers gained a total of 3,009 rushing yards on 603 attempts, an average of 250.8 yards per game. The Badgers also completed 191 of 283 passes for 2,453 yards, an average of 204.4 yards per game. On defense, the Badgers allowed an average of 130.3 rushing yards and 228.3 passing yards per game.

Brent Moss was the team's leading rusher and scorer. He gained 1,637 rushing yards on 312 attempts, an average of 5.2 yards per carry and 136.4 yards per game. Moss scored 96 points on 16 touchdowns. Terrell Fletcher ranked second on the team with 996 rushing yards and 60 points scored.

Darrell Bevell completed 187 of 276 passes (67.8%) for 2,390 yards, 19 touchdowns, 11 interceptions, and a passer efficiency rating of 155.2.

Lee DeRamus was the team's leading receiver with 54 catches for 920 yards (17.0-yard average) and six touchdowns. J. C. Dawkins was the number two receiver with 36 catches for 512 yards.

Jeff Messenger led the team with seven interceptions and six pass breakups. Yousef Burgess was the leading ackler with 63 solo tackles and 100 total tackles. Mike Thompson was the team leader in tackles for loss (13) and sacks (10).

== Awards and honors ==
Brent Moss won the Chicago Tribune Silver Football as the most valuable player in the Big Ten Conference. He also won the Jim Brown Trophy as the best running back in college football.

Barry Alvarez received both the Bobby Dodd Coach of the Year Award and the Dave McClain Big Ten Coach of the Year Award.

No Wisconsin players received first-team honors on the 1993 All-America team. Brent Moss received second-team honors from the Associated Press (AP) and Newspaper Enterprise Association (NEA). Offensive tackle Joe Panos also received second-team honors from the AP. Defensive lineman Lamark Shackerford received second-team honors from the NEA and third-team honors from the AP.

Eight Wisconsin players received first-team honors from the AP on the 1993 All-Big Ten Conference football team: Moss; quarterback Darrell Bevell; center Cory Raymer; offensive guard Joe Rudolph; offensive tackle Joe Panos; tight end Michael Roan; defensive lineman Lamark Shackerford; and defensive back Jeff Messenger. Three others were named to the second team: wide receiver Lee DeRamus; linebacker Yusef Burgess;and Reggie Holt.

== Wisconsin players selected in the 1994 NFL draft ==
Player	Position	Round	Overall Selection	NFL club
Joe Panos	Center	3	77	Philadelphia Eagles
Mark Montgomery	Running Back	7	206	Philadelphia Eagles
