= Todd Orlando =

American football player and coach (born 1971)

Current position
- Title: Defensive coordinator
- Team: South Alabama
- Conference: Sun Belt

Biographical details
- Born: March 24, 1971 (age 55); Pittsburgh, Pennsylvania

Playing career
- 1990–1993: Wisconsin
- Position: Linebacker

Coaching career (HC unless noted)
- 1994: Central Catholic HS (PA) (DC)
- 1995: Fox Chapel Area HS (PA) (DC)
- 1996–1998: Penn (LB)
- 1999–2004: Connecticut (ILB)
- 2005–2010: Connecticut (DC/ILB)
- 2011–2012: FIU (DC/LB)
- 2013–2014: Utah State (DC/LB)
- 2015–2016: Houston (DC/LB)
- 2017–2019: Texas (DC/LB)
- 2020–2021: USC (DC/LB)
- 2022: Florida Atlantic (DC/LB)
- 2023–2025: South Florida (DC/ILB)
- 2026–present: South Alabama (DC)

Todd Orlando (born March 24, 1971) is an American football coach, who is currently the defensive coordinator at South Alabama. He was most recently the defensive coordinator and inside linebackers coach at the University of South Florida. He was the defensive coordinator at the University of Texas at Austin from 2017 to 2019 and the University of Southern California (USC) from 2020 to 2021. Prior to Texas, he was the defensive coordinator and linebackers coach at the University of Houston. Prior to coaching at Houston, he was the defensive coordinator at Utah State University.

== Playing career ==
Orlando played linebacker at Central Catholic High School in Pittsburgh and then was a three-year (1991–1993) letterwinner at inside linebacker at the University of Wisconsin and a member of the 1993 Wisconsin Badgers football team, which shared the Big Ten Conference title and that defeated UCLA in 1994 Rose Bowl, in the Badgers' first Rose Bowl appearance since 1963.
