= 1993 Purdue Boilermakers football team =

American college football season

1993 Purdue Boilermakers football
- Conference: Big Ten Conference
- Record: 1–10 (0–8 Big Ten)
- Head coach: Jim Colletto (3rd season)
- Offensive coordinator: Bobby Turner (3rd season)
- Defensive coordinator: Moe Ankney (3rd season)
- MVP: Mike Alstott
- Captains: Elvin Caldwell; Jeff Hill; Pat Johnson; Jimmy Young
- Home stadium: Ross–Ade Stadium

1993 Big Ten Conference football standings
	Conf.					Overall
Team	W		L		T	W		L		T
No. 6 Wisconsin +	6	–	1	–	1	10	–	1	–	1
No. 11 Ohio State +	6	–	1	–	1	10	–	1	–	1
No. 8 Penn State	6	–	2	–	0	10	–	2	–	0
Indiana	5	–	3	–	0	8	–	4	–	0
No. 21 Michigan	5	–	3	–	0	8	–	4	–	0
Illinois	5	–	3	–	0	5	–	6	–	0
Michigan State	4	–	4	–	0	6	–	6	–	0
Iowa	3	–	5	–	0	6	–	6	–	0
Minnesota	3	–	5	–	0	4	–	7	–	0
Northwestern	0	–	8	–	0	2	–	9	–	0
Purdue	0	–	8	–	0	1	–	10	–	0
+ – Conference co-champions; Rankings from AP Poll

The 1993 Purdue Boilermakers football team was an American football team that represented Purdue University as a member of the Big Ten Conference during the 1993 NCAA Division I-A football season. Led by third-year head coach Jim Colletto, the Boilermakers compiled an overall record of 1–10 with a mark of 0–8 in conference play, tying for tenth place in the Big Ten. Purdue suffered its ninth consecutive losing season and was winless in conference for the first since the 1946 Purdue Boilermakers football team do so. The team played home games at Ross–Ade Stadium in West Lafayette, Indiana.

== Schedule ==
Date	Time	Opponent	Site	TV	Result	Attendance	Source
September 4	6:00 pm	at No. 24 NC State*	Carter–Finley Stadium; Raleigh, NC		L 7–20	41,904	
September 11	1:00 pm	Western Michigan*	Ross–Ade Stadium; West Lafayette, IN		W 28–13	57,670	
September 25	2:30 pm	No. 4 Notre Dame*	Ross–Ade Stadium; West Lafayette, IN (rivalry)	ABC	L 0–17	68,196	
October 2	1:00 pm	Illinois	Ross–Ade Stadium; West Lafayette, IN (rivalry)		L 10–28	37,621	
October 9	6:00 pm	at Minnesota	Hubert H. Humphrey Metrodome; Minneapolis, MN		L 56–59	31,293	
October 16	11:30 am	No. 16 Wisconsin^{†}	Ross–Ade Stadium; West Lafayette, IN	ESPN	L 28–42	38,942	
October 23	1:00 pm	No. 3 Ohio State	Ross–Ade Stadium; West Lafayette, IN		L 24–45	43,656	
October 30	1:00 pm	at Iowa	Kinnick Stadium; Iowa City, IA		L 17–26	65,648	
November 6	1:00 pm	at Michigan	Michigan Stadium; Ann Arbor, MI		L 10–25	104,326	
November 13	1:00 pm	No. 25 Michigan State	Ross–Ade Stadium; West Lafayette, IN		L 24–27	31,792	
November 20	1:00 pm	at No. 21 Indiana	Memorial Stadium; Bloomington, IN (Old Oaken Bucket)		L 17–24	48,429	
*Non-conference game; ^{†}Homecoming; Rankings from AP Poll released prior to the game; All times are in Eastern time

== Game summaries ==
=== Minnesota ===
- Mike Alstott 21 rushes, 171 yards

=== Indiana ===
- Corey Rogers 20 rushes, 123 yards

== Roster ==
1993 Purdue Boilermakers football team roster
Players
Coaches
Offense

Pos.	#	Name	Class
RB		Mike Alstott
WR		Tedman Brown
OL		Elvin Caldwell
OL		Mike Cardona
OL		Bill Clince
RB		Arlee Conners
TE		Scott Green
OL		Ryan Grigson
OL		Alfie Hill
RB		Jeff Hill
RB		Damon Lewis
WR		Kirk Olivadotti
QB		Matt Pike
RB		Corey Rogers
WR		Jermaine Ross
WR		Terry Samuel
OL		Chris Sedoris
TE		Tony Simmons
RB		Luis Smikle
TE		Charlie Stephens
WR		Burt Thornton
QB		Rick Trefzger
OL		Emmett Zitelli

Defense

Pos.	#	Name	Class
LB		Romond Batton
DB		Courtland Byrd
LB		Chris Coeppen
DL		James Cole
LB		Bart Conley
DB		Ikee Dozier
DL		Eric Gray
LB		Joe Hagins
LB		Aaron Hall
DL		Darnell Howard
DB		John Jackson
DB		Pat Johnson
DB		Brian Lohman
LB		Houston Malden
DL		Ben Metzger
DB		Kevin Nolan
LB		Bob O'Connor
DB		Brian Thurman
DL		Jarrod Walker
DL		Jayme Washel
DB		Jimmy Young

Special teams

Pos.	#	Name	Class
K		Brad Bobich
P		Rob Deignan
KR		Kevin Sellers

Head coach

- Jim Colletto

Coordinators/assistant coaches

- Chester Caddas

Legend

- (C) Team captain
- (S) Suspended
- (I) Ineligible
- Injured
- Redshirt
