= Jim Colletto =

American football player and coach (born 1944)

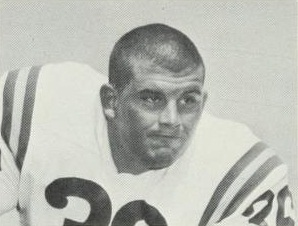
- Colletto from 1965 UCLA yearbook

Biographical details
- Born: October 4, 1944 (age 82)

Playing career
- 1963–1965: UCLA
- Positions: Defensive end, fullback

Coaching career (HC unless noted)
- 1967–1968: UCLA (OL)
- 1969: Brown (OL)
- 1970–1971: Xavier (OL)
- 1972–1974: Pacific (CA) (OL)
- 1975–1979: Cal State Fullerton
- 1980–1981: UCLA (OL)
- 1982–1984: Purdue (OC)
- 1985–1987: Arizona State (OC)
- 1988–1990: Ohio State (OC)
- 1991–1996: Purdue
- 1997–1998: Notre Dame (OC)
- 1999–2005: Baltimore Ravens (OL)
- 2006: UCLA (AHC/OL)
- 2007–2008: Detroit Lions (OC/OL)

Head coaching record
- Overall: 38–80–4

Accomplishments and honors

Awards
- First-team All-PCC (1965)

Jim Colletto (born October 4, 1944) is an American former football player and coach. He attended Monterey High School (1958–1962) where he was an all conference baseball and football player and starter on the varsity basketball team. At UCLA Colletto was all conference in baseball and football; where he led the team in rushing as a sophomore and as a senior defensive end was captain of the UCLA team that beat Michigan State in the 1966 Rose Bowl.

He served as the head football coach at California State University, Fullerton from 1975 to 1979 and at Purdue University from 1991 to 1996, compiling a career college football record of 38–80–4. Colletto was the offensive coordinator for the Detroit Lions of the National Football League, replacing Mike Martz, who was fired on January 2, 2008. He was hired as the Lions' offensive line coach on January 29, 2007, after spending a year as the UCLA offensive line coach under Karl Dorrell. Prior to that he was offensive line coach for the Baltimore Ravens from 1999 thought 2005. Colletto was previously the offensive coordinator at the University of Notre Dame for the 1997 and 1998 seasons and was the head coach at Purdue University from 1991 to 1996. During his six seasons at Purdue, Colletto's teams compiled a 21–42–3 record.

Colletto was a member of the 2000 Baltimore Ravens Super Bowl XXXV championship team.

== Purdue ==
Colletto was named Purdue University's head coach in December 1990, accepting the position while he was serving as the offensive coordinator for Ohio State. Colletto came to Purdue with the goal of recruiting kids from the Chicago area, and keeping Purdue's quarterback tradition trending onward. During his introduction press conference, he stated that at the practice field, he planned to install a small cemetery in which he would place a tombstone for every school Purdue upset or beat on the road. Colletto also provided up change on offense, as he brought his I formation with him from Ohio State. During his first season as head coach, the Boilermakers improved winning two more games than they had the year before, and freshman tailback Corey Rogers was named the Big Ten Freshman of the Year.

In 1992, Colletto lost Rogers to academic ineligibility, and was forced to use a new running back. The Rogers suspension opened the door for what would become Purdue's all-time leading rusher, Mike Alstott.

In 1993, Colletto was in some hot water when former player, Ryan Harmon sued Purdue, claiming that Colletto had physically and mentally abused him.

In 1994, the Boilermakers got out to a 4–1–1 start, and were starting to gain national attention. With Rogers and Alstott leading the way out of the Purdue backfield, Purdue racked up 1,206 and 17 rushing touchdowns in 6 games. However Purdue stumbled down the stretch, finishing the season 0–4–1. (1-3-1 due to Michigan state forfeiting all their 1994 games)

Colletto resigned in November 1996.

Colletto was hired in December as Notre Dame's offensive coordinator in December 1996.

Colletto was subsequently defeated his first year as OC at Notre Dame at the hands of the Purdue Boilermakers.

== Head coaching record ==
| Year | Team | Overall | Conference | Standing | Bowl/playoffs |
|---|---|---|---|---|---|
Cal State Fullerton Titans (Pacific Coast Athletic Association) (1975–1979)
| 1975 | Cal State Fullerton | 2–9 | 0–5 | 6th | |
| 1976 | Cal State Fullerton | 3–7–1 | 1–3 | 4th | |
| 1977 | Cal State Fullerton | 4–7 | 0–4 | 5th | |
| 1978 | Cal State Fullerton | 5–7 | 2–2 | 4th | |
| 1979 | Cal State Fullerton | 3–8 | 1–4 | 5th | |
| Cal State Fullerton: | | 17–38–1 | 4–18 | | |
Purdue Boilermakers (Big Ten Conference) (1991–1996)
| 1991 | Purdue | 4–7 | 3–5 | T–6th | |
| 1992 | Purdue | 4–7 | 3–5 | T–6th | |
| 1993 | Purdue | 1–10 | 0–8 | T–10th | |
| 1994 | Purdue | 5–4–2 | 3–3–2 | T–5th | |
| 1995 | Purdue | 4–6–1 | 2–5–1 | 9th | |
| 1996 | Purdue | 3–8 | 2–6 | 8th | |
| Purdue: | | 21–42–3 | 13–32–3 | | |
| Total: | | 38–80–4 | | | |
