= 1993 All-Big Ten Conference football team =

1993 American football team in NCAA

The 1993 All-Big Ten Conference football team consists of American football players chosen as All-Big Ten Conference players for the 1993 NCAA Division I-A football season.

== Offensive selections ==
=== Quarterbacks ===
- Darrell Bevell, Wisconsin (AP-1)
- Jim Miller, Michigan State (AP-2)

=== Running backs ===
- Brent Moss, Wisconsin (AP-1) (Offensive Player of the Year)
- Tyrone Wheatley, Michigan (AP-1)
- Raymont Harris, Ohio State (AP-2)
- Ki-Jana Carter, Penn State (AP-2)

=== Receivers ===
- Joey Galloway, Ohio State (AP-1)
- Bobby Engram, Penn State (AP-1)
- Omar Douglas, Minnesota (AP-2)
- Lee DeRamus, Wisconsin (AP-2)

=== Tight ends ===
- Michael Roan, Wisconsin (AP-1)
- Kyle Brady, Penn State (AP-2)

=== Centers ===
- Cory Raymer, Wisconsin (AP-1)
- Greg Engel, Illinois (AP-2)

=== Guards ===
- Jason Winrow, Ohio State (AP-1)
- Joe Rudolph, Wisconsin (AP-1)
- Rob Rogers, Minnesota (AP-2)
- Joe Marinaro, Michigan (AP-2)

=== Tackles ===
- Joe Panos, Wisconsin (AP-1)
- Korey Stringer, Ohio State (AP-1)
- Shane Hannah, Michigan State (AP-2)
- Matt O'Dwyer, Northwestern (AP-2)

== Defensive selections ==
=== Defensive linemen ===
- Dan Wilkinson, Ohio State (AP-1)
- Simeon Rice, Illinois (AP-1)
- Mike Wells, Iowa (AP-1)
- Lamark Shackerford, Wisconsin (AP-1)
- Hurvin McCormack, Indiana (AP-1)
- Buster Stanley, Michigan (AP-2)
- Lou Benfatti, Penn State (AP-2)
- Rob Fredrickson, Michigan State (AP-2)
- Steve Shine, Northwestern (AP-2)
- Jason Simmons, Ohio State (AP-2)

=== Linebackers ===
- Dana Howard, Illinois (AP-1) (Defensive Player of the Year)
- Lorenzo Styles, Ohio State (AP-1)
- John Holecek, Illinois (AP-1)
- Yusef Burgess, Wisconsin (AP-2)
- Brian Gelzheiser, Penn State (AP-2)
- Charles Beauchamp, Indiana (AP-2)

=== Defensive backs ===
- Ty Law, Michigan (AP-1)
- Jeff Messenger, Wisconsin (AP-1)
- Jimmy Young, Purdue (AP-1)
- Chico Nelson, Ohio State (AP-2)
- Derek Bochna, Penn State (AP-2)
- Shelly Hammonds, Penn State (AP-2)
- Reggie Holt, Wisconsin (AP-2)

== Special teams ==
=== Kickers ===
- Bill Manolopolous, Indiana (AP-1)
- Tim Williams, Ohio State (AP-2)

=== Punters ===
- Jim DiGuilio, Indiana (AP-1)
- Nick Gallery, Iowa (AP-2)

== Key ==
AP = Associated Press, selected by a Midwest media panel

== See also ==
- 1993 College Football All-America Team
