= 1994 Rose Bowl =

American college football game

- 80th Rose Bowl Game
Wisconsin Badgers	UCLA Bruins
(9–1–1)	(8–3)
21	16
Head coach: Barry Alvarez	Head coach: Terry Donahue
AP / Coaches / BC; 9 / 7 / 9	AP / Coaches / BC; 14 / 13 / 14
	1	2	3	4	Total
Wisconsin	7	7	0	7	21
UCLA	3	0	0	13	16
- Date: January 1, 1994
- Season: 1993
- Stadium: Rose Bowl
- Location: Pasadena, California
- MVP: Brent Moss (Wisconsin RB)
- National anthem: UCLA's The Solid Gold Sound Band
- Referee: John Laurie (Big Eight)
- Halftime show: UCLA's The Solid Gold Sound Band and University of Wisconsin Marching Band
- Attendance: 101,237

United States TV coverage
- Network: ABC
- Announcers: Keith Jackson, Bob Griese

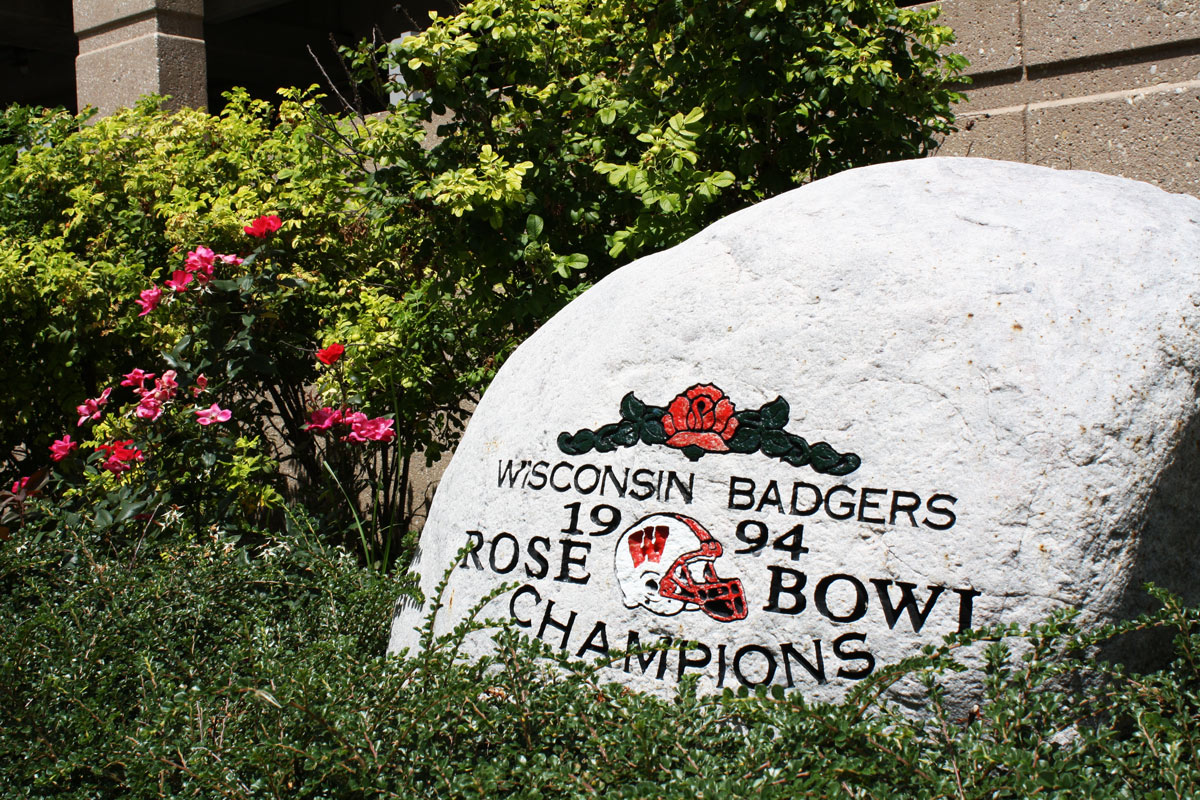
Monument dedicated to the Badgers four Rose Bowl championships, located behind Camp Randall Stadium.

The 1994 Rose Bowl was a college football bowl game played on January 1, 1994. It was the 80th Rose Bowl Game. The Wisconsin Badgers defeated the UCLA Bruins 21–16. Running back Brent Moss of Wisconsin was named the Rose Bowl Player of the Game.

== Pre-game activities ==
On Tuesday, October 19, 1993, Tournament of Roses Interim President Michael E. Ward selected 18-year-old Erica Beth Brynes, a senior at Arcadia High School and a resident of Arcadia, as the 76th Rose Queen, to reign over the 105th Rose Parade and the 80th Rose Bowl Game.

The game was presided over by the 1994 Tournament of Roses Royal Court and Rose Parade Grand Marshal William Shatner. The Royal Court was led by Queen Erica and consisted of six rose princesses: Nicole Bangar, South Pasadena; Therese Erdman, Arcadia; Shannon Hall, San Marino; Sabrina Prud'homme, Altadena; Shannon Sheldon, San Marino; and Jennifer Trayner, San Marino.

Before the game, Chris Farley gave Wisconsin's “motivational speech” playing his popular Saturday Night Live character, Matt Foley.

== Teams ==
=== Wisconsin Badgers ===
In the final game of the season, Wisconsin defeated Michigan State in the last Coca-Cola Classic to secure a conference co-championship. The Badgers' sole loss was to Minnesota by a score of 21–28 in their annual rivalry game.

Ohio State lost to Michigan, 28–0, in their annual rivalry game. Wisconsin and Ohio State ended the season with identical 9–1–1 records with 6–1–1 conference records, and tied when they met during the season in a game at Camp Randall (college football would not adopt "overtime" to resolve ties in regulation until the 1996 season). Wisconsin and Ohio State were co-champions of the Big Ten Conference. Wisconsin won the Rose Bowl invitation tiebreaker due to Big Ten rules which resolved first-place ties by eliminating the most recent invitee: Wisconsin had last been to the Rose Bowl in 1963, while Ohio State was in the 1985 Rose Bowl.

=== UCLA Bruins ===
UCLA opened the season with two close losses: 25–27 against California, and 13–14 against Nebraska. The Bruins then won seven in a row, including a win over #7 Arizona. They lost 3–9 against Arizona State. The 1993 UCLA–USC rivalry game had the Pac-10 championship and the Rose Bowl berth on the line for both the Bruins and the Trojans. UCLA won 27–21 at the Coliseum. Arizona was tied for first, but did not receive the Rose Bowl invitation because of the head-to-head loss at UCLA. This was coach Terry Donahue's last Rose Bowl appearance.

== Game summary ==
The weather was 73 degrees and hazy. UCLA receiver J. J. Stokes set Rose Bowl records for receptions (14) and receiving yards (176). Brent Moss gashed the UCLA defense for 158 rushing yards and 2 touchdowns.

=== Scoring ===
==== First quarter ====
- UCLA — Bjorn Merten, 27-yard field goal.
- Wisconsin — Brent Moss three-yard run. Rick Schnetzky converts.

==== Second quarter ====
- Wisconsin — Moss, one-yard run. Schnetzky converts.

==== Third quarter ====
No Scoring

==== Fourth quarter ====
- UCLA — Ricky Davis 12-yard run. Merten converts.
- Wisconsin — Darrell Bevell 21-yard run. Schnetzky converts.
- UCLA — Mike Nguyen, five-yard pass from Wayne Cook. 2-point conversion Pass failed.

=== Statistics ===
Team stats	Wisconsin	UCLA
First downs	21	31
Net Yards Rushing	250	212
Net Yards Passing	96	288
Total Yards	346	500
PC–PA–Int.	10–20–1	28–43–1
Punts–Avg.	6–38.2	2–35.0
Fumbles–Lost	2–0	5–5
Penalties–Yards	12–89	9–95

== Notes ==
- UCLA offensive tackle Jonathan Ogden went on to play for the Baltimore Ravens and was inducted into the College Football Hall of Fame and the Pro Football Hall of Fame.

== Bibliography ==
- Kopriva, Don (1998). On Wisconsin!: The History of Badger Athletics from 1896-1998. Jim Mott. Sports Publishing LLC. ISBN 1-57167-038-6.
