= Fred Borak =

American football player (1913–2009)

No. 9
- Position: End

Personal information
- Born: May 30, 1913; Kenosha, Wisconsin, U.S.
- Died: June 7, 2009 (aged 96); Wausau, Wisconsin, U.S.
- Listed height: 6 ft 1 in (1.85 m)
- Listed weight: 195 lb (88 kg)

Career information
- High school: Kenosha (Kenosha, Wisconsin)
- College: Wisconsin (1933); Creighton (1934–1937)

Career history
- Green Bay Packers (1938); Kenosha Cardinals (1939)

Career statistics
- Games played: 1
- Stats at Pro Football Reference

Fred Aloisius "Fritz" Borak (May 30, 1913 – June 7, 2009) was an American professional football player. An end from Kenosha, Wisconsin, he played college football for the Wisconsin Badgers for one year before dropping out. He then played for the Creighton Bluejays from 1934 to 1937 and was an honorable mention All-American as a senior. He then played for the Green Bay Packers of the National Football League (NFL) in 1938, appearing in one game. After briefly playing basketball and for a non-NFL football team, he joined the United States Army and served as an officer in North Africa and Italy during World War II, reaching the rank of major.

== Early life ==
Borak was born on May 30, 1913, in Kenosha, Wisconsin. He attended Kenosha High School where he played football as an end and basketball as a center. In basketball, he was named all-state as a junior while helping Kenosha tie for the conference title; he also was the leading scorer at the state tournament. He served as team captain during his senior season in 1932–33 and repeated as an all-state selection. Described as "one of the best known athletes ever" in Kenosha by the Kenosha News, Borak also served as captain of the football team and was reported in the paper as "in an invincible class when it comes to snagging passes". After high school, he decided to enroll at the University of Wisconsin–Madison in 1933.

== College career ==
After enrolling at Wisconsin, Borak planned to join the freshman basketball, football, and track and field teams. According to the Kenosha News, he "dazzled" for the freshman football team at end and often performed well in practices against the varsity team, putting him in a position to make varsity as a sophomore. However, he struggled academically and was advised not to play freshman basketball by coach Clarence Spears so he could focus on his education. Despite this, he became ineligible by failing his physical education course and finishing one point short of the required grade in the mid-semester examinations. Afterwards, Borak declared that he was "disgruntled and thoroughly disgusted" with how Wisconsin managed its athletic situation and he dropped out of the school in February 1934. He subsequently joined the Capital Club, a basketball team in Kenosha. He helped them win the state championship.

Later that year, Borak decided to enroll at Creighton University in Nebraska, where he quickly became a top end for the freshman football team. After the football season, he joined the freshman basketball team and helped it compile an undefeated record while playing as a forward. The starting five of the Creighton freshman basketball team was entirely composed of Kenosha natives who had played together for the Capital Club. He then made the varsity football team at Creighton in 1935 and excelled on defense for the team. That season, he had what he described a few years later as his biggest thrill in football: with Creighton losing 6–0 to Drake, Floyd King of Creighton intercepted a pass and then lateraled to Borak, who took the lateral and ran 75 yards for a touchdown; the game ended as a 6–6 tie. After the football season, Borak and three others were initially suspended from the basketball team for reporting late, but were later reinstated for the 1935–36 season.

Borak returned to Creighton's football team in 1936 and was a 60-minute man, receiving comparisons to Elmer Lang, "the greatest right end ever to play on a Creighton football team." He played his last year at Creighton in 1937, being described by The Omaha Morning Bee-News as "a hard worker [and] a demon on defense". At the start of the season, he scored a game-winning touchdown on a blocked punt to defeat St. Benedict's College, the first game the team had lost out of their last 16. He had his best season as a senior and was named honorable mention All-Missouri Valley Conference, as well as an honorable mention All-American by Collier's. He graduated from Creighton in journalism in 1938. While at Creighton, he was also involved in the Reserve Officers' Training Corps (ROTC) and assisted in coaching football at Creighton High School.

== Professional career ==
After college, Borak received interest from several professional football teams. He recalled to the Milwaukee Journal Sentinel in 2008 that "They didn't really have agents in football back then. I got three offers: one from Green Bay, one from the New York Giants, and one from a semi-pro team in New Jersey. I asked my wife if she wanted to go to New York and she said no. So I really had no choice and went back to Wisconsin." He signed with the Green Bay Packers in February 1938. He recalled that his contract was for $150 a game and after signing, he sent a note to coach Curly Lambeau that "I'd be there when I can." He completed ROTC training at Fort Crook before being allowed to report to the Packers in August 1938. He made the team and made his NFL debut in the season-opener, appearing in the fourth quarter of the Packers' 26–17 win over the Cleveland Rams. It ended up being the only regular season game he played, as he was later released on October 17, 1938, though Borak noted that he also appeared in several other exhibition games with the Packers.

In 1939, Borak signed with the Kenosha Cardinals of the American Professional Football Association, appearing in three games, two as a starter, during the 1939 season. After the football season, he joined a basketball team composed of his former Kenosha teammates at Creighton. He also competed for the Kenosha Royals team that participated at the World Professional Basketball Tournament. He recalled once playing against the Harlem Globetrotters with his Kenosha team: "I'll bet you can guess who won that game."

== Later life and death ==
Borak worked for Kenosha's engineering department. He was called to report to the United States Army in 1939 and later assigned to Camp Livingston in Louisiana. Recalling the 1941 attack on Pearl Harbor, he said that "I was a second lieutenant at the time and had to wake up the Colonel when all hell broke loose." He worked as a military police officer for two years in Washington and was promoted to the rank of captain in 1942. He received a deployment to North Africa in 1943 and worked as a safety officer in Italy in 1945. He described his role as "rebuilding cities after the battles ... [and] helping putting everything back together as close to normal as possible." He received a promotion to major in March 1945.

Following the war, Borak returned to Kenosha and began working for the Kenosha Housing Authority. He served as secretary of the housing authority, which helped provide homes for veterans of the war. He was sent to England in 1950 amidst the start of the Korean War, living there two years and serving as head of security at the Fairfield air base. After the Korean War, Borak returned home and continued working in Kenosha, before retiring in 1973. He spent the later years of his life in Land o' Lakes, Wisconsin.

With his wife, Pauline, Borak had one son, Fred Jr. On the death of Herm Schneidman, he became the oldest living former Packer. He died on June 7, 2009, in Wausau, at the age of 96.
