= Joe Panos =

American football player (born 1971)

No. 63, 72
- Position: Guard

Personal information
- Born: January 24, 1971 (age 55); Brookfield, Wisconsin, U.S.
- Listed height: 6 ft 3 in (1.91 m)
- Listed weight: 300 lb (136 kg)

Career information
- High school: Brookfield East
- College: Wisconsin-Whitewater; Wisconsin
- NFL draft: 1994: 3rd round, 77th overall pick

Career history
- Philadelphia Eagles (1994–1997); Buffalo Bills (1998–2000); New England Patriots (2001)*
- * Offseason or practice squad member only

Awards and highlights
- PFWA All-Rookie Team (1994); Second-team All-American (1993); First-team All-Big Ten (1993)

Career NFL statistics
- Games played: 83
- Games started: 56
- Fumble recoveries: 1
- Stats at Pro Football Reference

Joe Panos (born Zois Panagiotopoulos on January 24, 1971) is an American former professional football player who was a guard in the National Football League (NFL) for the Philadelphia Eagles and Buffalo Bills. After Brookfield East High School, he played college football at the University of Wisconsin–Madison, where he was a walk on and later became captain of the 1994 Rose Bowl team.

== Career ==
=== College ===
Panos started his college career playing defensive tackle at Division III University of Wisconsin-Whitewater. He transferred to the University of Wisconsin-Madison and quickly became a starter. He played in 32 consecutive games.

==== Awards ====
- 1992 Second-team All-Big Ten
- 1993 1st team All-Big Ten
- 1993 2nd Team All-American.
- 1994 co-captain of the Rose Bowl championship team.

=== Pro football ===
Pre-draft measurables
Height	Weight	Arm length	Hand span	Bench press
6 ft 2 7/8 in (1.90 m)	296 lb (134 kg)	32 in (0.81 m)	9 3/4 in (0.25 m)	28 reps
All values from NFL Combine

Panos was selected by the Eagles with the 77th pick in the third round of the 1994 NFL draft. He played in the NFL for 6 years. During his time with the Philadelphia Eagles and the Buffalo Bills he played in 83 games and he started 56 games. He had 17 penalties over his NFL career. He is now a sports agent with Athletes First, Panos represents former Green Bay Packers quarterback Aaron Rodgers and linebacker Clay Matthews, among other NFL players.

Joe Panos NFL Statistics
	Games						Def Interceptions					Fumbles				
YEAR	Age	TM	Pos	No.	G	GS	Int	Yds	TD	Long	PD	FF	FMB	FR	Yds	TD
1994	23	PHI	G	63	16	2										
1995	24	PHI	RG	72	9	9										
1996	25	PHI	LG	72	16	16										
1997	26	PHI	LG	72	13	13							0	0	1	0
1998	27	BUF	RG	72	16	16										
2000	29	BUF		72	13	0										
Career					83	56						0	0	1	0	0

== Personal life ==
Panos was married to Michelle; together they have 3 kids. George is a scout for Houston, and Alex plays football at St. Thomas University in Minnesota. Their youngest child, Olivia is in college at the University of Wisconsin Madison.
