= Pat Johnson (American football) =

American football player (born 1972)

No. 24
- Position: Defensive back

Personal information
- Born: June 10, 1972 (age 54); Mineral Point, Missouri, U.S.
- Listed height: 6 ft 1 in (1.85 m)
- Listed weight: 204 lb (93 kg)

Career information
- High school: Potosi (MO)
- College: Purdue
- NFL draft: 1994: undrafted

Career history
- Atlanta Falcons (1994)*; Miami Dolphins (1994–1995); Green Bay Packers (1996)*
- * Offseason or practice squad member only

Career NFL statistics
- Fumble recoveries: 1
- Touchdowns: 1
- Stats at Pro Football Reference

John Patrick Johnson (born June 10, 1972) is an American former professional football player who was a defensive back for the Miami Dolphins in the National Football League (NFL). He played college football for the Purdue Boilermakers, and was also a member of the Atlanta Falcons and Green Bay Packers.

== College career ==
Johnson played college football for the Boilermakers at Purdue University, and was named by the Journal and Courier as the best player with number 29 in school history.

== Professional career ==
After going undrafted, Johnson signed with the Atlanta Falcons in 1994. Later that year he joined the Miami Dolphins, but was released in preseason.

Johnson returned to the Miami Dolphins in 1995. He played 14-of-16 games of the season. In week 17 against the St. Louis Rams, Johnson returned a fumble for a 37-yard touchdown in the fourth quarter, securing the victory.

In 1996, Johnson was claimed off waivers by the Green Bay Packers, but was later released.
