= Mike Verstegen =

American football player (born 1971)

No. 66, 67
- Position: Guard

Personal information
- Born: October 24, 1971 (age 55); Appleton, Wisconsin, U.S.
- Listed height: 6 ft 6 in (1.98 m)
- Listed weight: 251 lb (114 kg)

Career information
- High school: Kimberly (Kimberly, Wisconsin)
- College: Wisconsin
- NFL draft: 1995: 3rd round, 75th overall pick

Career history
- New Orleans Saints (1995–1997); St. Louis Rams (1998)

Awards and highlights
- First-team All-Big Ten (1994)

Career NFL statistics
- Games played: 22
- Games started: 12
- Stats at Pro Football Reference

Michael Robert Verstegen (born October 24, 1971) is an American former professional football player who was an offensive lineman in the National Football League (NFL). He graduated from Kimberly High School in Kimberly, Wisconsin. He was selected in the third round of the 1995 NFL draft with the 75th overall pick. He was with the New Orleans Saints (1995–1997) and the St. Louis Rams (1998). He played at the collegiate level at the University of Wisconsin–Madison.

== See also ==
- List of New Orleans Saints players
