= Darrell Bevell =

American football coach (born 1970)

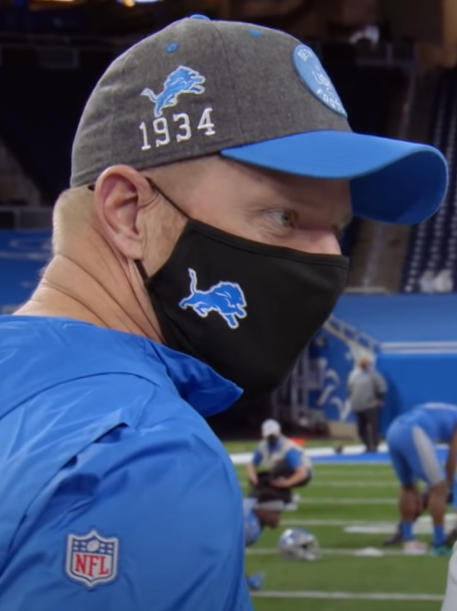
- Bevell with the Detroit Lions in 2020

Carolina Panthers
- Title: Associate head coach, offensive specialist

Personal information
- Born: January 6, 1970 (age 56); Yuma, Arizona, U.S.

Career information
- Position: Quarterback
- High school: Chaparral (Scottsdale, Arizona)
- College: Wisconsin (1992–1995)
- NFL draft: 1996: undrafted

Career history
- Westmar (1996) Passing game coordinator & quarterbacks coach; Iowa State (1997) Graduate assistant; Connecticut (1998–1999) Wide receivers coach; Green Bay Packers (2000–2005); Assistant quarterbacks coach (2000–2002); Quarterbacks coach (2003–2005); Minnesota Vikings (2006–2010) Offensive coordinator; Seattle Seahawks (2011–2017) Offensive coordinator; Detroit Lions (2019–2020); Offensive coordinator (2019–2020); Interim head coach (2020); Jacksonville Jaguars (2021); Offensive coordinator (2021); Interim head coach (2021); Miami Dolphins (2022–2025) Quarterbacks coach & passing game coordinator; Carolina Panthers (2026–present) Associate head coach & offensive specialist

Awards and highlights
- Super Bowl champion (XLVIII); First-team All-Big Ten (1993); Second-team All-Big Ten (1995)

Head coaching record
- Regular season: 2–7 (.222)
- Coaching profile at Pro Football Reference

Darrell Wayne Bevell (born January 6, 1970) is an American football coach who is the assistant head coach for the Carolina Panthers of the National Football League (NFL). He previously served as the offensive coordinator for the Minnesota Vikings from 2006 to 2010, the Seattle Seahawks from 2011 to 2017, the Detroit Lions in 2019 and for the first 11 games of the 2020 season before being named the interim head coach for the rest of the season, and the Jacksonville Jaguars in 2021. Bevell played college football for the University of Wisconsin, where he was a four-year starting quarterback.

== Playing career ==
After playing at Chaparral High School in Scottsdale, Arizona, Bevell redshirted as a freshman quarterback at Northern Arizona University. At the time, Brad Childress was NAU's offensive coordinator. Bevell then embarked on a two-year Latter-day Saint mission to Cleveland, Ohio. When he returned from his missionary service, Childress had joined the staff of Barry Alvarez at Wisconsin. Bevell was offered scholarships from NAU and Utah, but he decided to join Childress at Wisconsin.

Bevell guided the 1993 Wisconsin Badgers football team to a winning season culminating in a Rose Bowl victory over UCLA. That win represented the Badgers first Rose Bowl appearance since 1963 and first ever Rose Bowl win. In that game, Bevell had a fourth-quarter scramble for 21 yards for a touchdown that sealed the Badger victory. They defeated the Duke Blue Devils 34–20 in the 1995 Hall of Fame Bowl, giving Wisconsin back-to-back bowl wins for the first time ever. Bevell finished his college career with 19 school records, including most passing yards in a single game (423) and in a career (7,686).

== Coaching career ==
=== College ===
After going undrafted in the 1996 NFL draft, Bevell began a career in coaching, including stints at Westmar University (Le Mars, IA), Iowa State University, and the University of Connecticut.

=== National Football League ===
==== Seattle Seahawks ====
In 2013, the Seahawks finished the season with a 13–3 record and eventually defeated the Denver Broncos by a score of 43–8 in Super Bowl XLVIII. Bevell's rushing offense was fourth in the league with 2,188 yards and averaged 136.8 yards per game. Overall, in total offense, Bevell's team finished 18th in the league, producing 339.0 yards per game.

In 2014, the Seahawks finished the season at 12–4 and attempted to repeat as Super Bowl champions. They came short in Super Bowl XLIX, which they lost to the New England Patriots after passing on 2nd and goal from the one-yard line with 26 seconds left. Trailing 28–24, Russell Wilson targeted wide receiver Ricardo Lockette, but New England cornerback Malcolm Butler intercepted Wilson's pass with 20 seconds left on the clock. The play call was widely criticized. "I can't believe the call," NBC color commentator Cris Collinsworth said after the play was run. "You have Marshawn Lynch. You have a guy who's been borderline unstoppable. ... If I lose this Super Bowl because Marshawn Lynch can't get into the end zone, so be it. So be it. I can't believe the call". Sports Illustrated writer Peter King called the play one of the worst calls in Super Bowl history, and so did retired NFL hall of famer Deion Sanders. Retired running back Emmitt Smith, the NFL's all-time leading rusher, went even further, calling it the worst play call in the history of football. Bevell acknowledged making the call, but also remarked that Lockette could have been more aggressive on the play. Wilson said the play was a "good call", and lamented throwing the interception and "not making that play." Head coach Pete Carroll, though, said the last play was "all my fault", and called Bevell "crucially important to our future." Carroll added that Seattle would have run the ball on a subsequent play. "We don't ever call a play thinking we might throw an interception."

Bevell was dismissed from the Seahawks in January 2018.

==== Detroit Lions ====
On January 16, 2019, Bevell was hired by the Detroit Lions to be their offensive coordinator, replacing Jim Bob Cooter.

On November 28, 2020, Bevell assumed the title of interim head coach following the firing of head coach Matt Patricia. On December 6, Bevell won his head coaching debut against the Chicago Bears by a score of 34–30. He missed the team's week 16 matchup against the Tampa Bay Buccaneers due to COVID-19 protocols.

==== Jacksonville Jaguars ====
On January 21, 2021, Bevell was hired by the Jacksonville Jaguars as their offensive coordinator under new head coach Urban Meyer.

For the second consecutive season, Bevell was named interim head coach after the Jaguars fired Meyer following a 2–11 start to the season.

==== Miami Dolphins ====
On February 16, 2022, Bevell was hired by the Miami Dolphins to serve as the team's quarterbacks coach and passing game coordinator.

==== Carolina Panthers ====
On February 11, 2026, Bevell was hired to serve as the associate head coach/offensive specialist for the Carolina Panthers under head coach Dave Canales.

== Head coaching record ==
Team	Year	Regular season					Postseason			
Team	Year	Won	Lost	Ties	Win %	Finish	Won	Lost	Win %	Result
DET*	2020	1	4	0	.200	4th in NFC North	—	—	—	—
DET total		1	4	0	.200		0	0	.000	
JAX*	2021	1	3	0	.250	4th in AFC South	—	—	—	—
JAX total		1	3	0	.250		0	0	.000	
Total		2	7	0	.222		0	0	.000	

* Interim head coach
