= Joe Rudolph =

American football player and coach (born 1972)

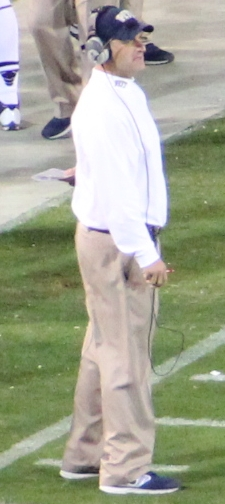
- Rudolph in 2013

Current position
- Title: Offensive line coach
- Team: Notre Dame
- Conference: Independent

Biographical details
- Born: July 21, 1972 (age 54); Charleroi, Pennsylvania, U.S.
- Education: University of Wisconsin–Madison; Carnegie Mellon University

Playing career
- 1991–1994: Wisconsin
- 1995: Philadelphia Eagles
- 1997: San Francisco 49ers
- Positions: Offensive line, Guard

Coaching career (HC unless noted)
- 2004–2006: Ohio State (GA)
- 2007: Nebraska (TE)
- 2008–2011: Wisconsin (TE)
- 2012–2014: Pittsburgh (AHC/OC)
- 2014: Pittsburgh (Interim HC)
- 2015–2021: Wisconsin (AHC/OC/OL)
- 2022: Virginia Tech (OL)
- 2023–present: Notre Dame (OL)

Head coaching record
- Overall: 0–1
- Bowls: 0–1

Accomplishments and honors

Awards
- 2× First-team All-Big Ten (1993, 1994)

Joseph Daniel Rudolph (born July 21, 1972) is an American football coach and former guard who is the offensive line coach of the Notre Dame Fighting Irish. He served as the interim head coach of the Pittsburgh Panthers in 2014 for the Armed Forces Bowl, and also coached for the Nebraska Cornhuskers, Wisconsin Badgers, Pittsburgh Panthers, and Virginia Tech Hokies. He played in the National Football League (NFL) for the San Francisco 49ers and Philadelphia Eagles.

== Biography ==
Rudolph was born in Charleroi, Pennsylvania and is married to Dawn DeCaria Rudolph of Weirton, West Virginia. Together they have three sons. He attended the University of Wisconsin-Madison, where he was a team captain on the football team, and the Tepper School of Business at Carnegie Mellon University.

== Professional playing career ==
Rudolph played with the Philadelphia Eagles in 1995. After spending 1996 away from the NFL, he returned in 1997 to play with the San Francisco 49ers.

== Coaching career ==
Rudolph's first coaching experience was as a graduate assistant with the Ohio State Buckeyes. In 2007, Rudolph served as Tight Ends Coach of the Nebraska Cornhuskers. While there he also worked on special teams and oversaw the punt team. He then served as the tight ends coach of the Wisconsin Badgers football team from 2008 to 2011.

== Head coaching record ==
Year	Team	Overall	Conference	Standing	Bowl/playoffs
Pittsburgh Panthers (Atlantic Coast Conference) (2014)
2014	Pittsburgh	0–1*		T–3rd (Coastal)	L Armed Forces
Pittsburgh:		0–1			
Total:		0–1			

Rudolph served as interim coach after Paul Chryst left for Wisconsin after the regular season. Pittsburgh credits the regular season to Chryst and the Armed Forces Bowl to Rudolph.

== See also ==
- List of Philadelphia Eagles players
