= Eric Unverzagt =

American football player (born 1972)

No. 53
- Position: Linebacker

Personal information
- Born: December 18, 1972 (age 53); Central Islip, New York, U.S.
- Listed height: 6 ft 1 in (1.85 m)
- Listed weight: 241 lb (109 kg)

Career information
- High school: Central Islip
- College: Wisconsin
- NFL draft: 1996: 4th round, 131st overall pick

Career history
- Seattle Seahawks (1996); Scottish Claymores (1997); Seattle Seahawks (1997); Detroit Lions (1998)*
- * Offseason or practice squad member only

Career NFL statistics
- Tackles: 1
- Stats at Pro Football Reference

Eric Unverzagt (born December 18, 1972) is a former linebacker who played in the National Football League (NFL).

== Biography ==
Unverzagt was born Eric James Unverzagt on December 18, 1972, in Central Islip, New York.

== Career ==
Unverzagt was selected in the fourth round of the 1996 NFL draft by the Seattle Seahawks and played with the team for two seasons. He played at the collegiate level at the University of Wisconsin-Madison.
