= Reggie Holt =

American football player (born 1971)

Profile
- Position: Safety

Personal information
- Born: February 18, 1971

Career information
- College: Wisconsin

Career history
- 1995: Green Bay Packers
- 1997: London Monarchs

Awards and highlights
- Second-team All-Big Ten (1993)

Reggie Holt (born February 18, 1971) is a former safety in the National Football League (NFL). He was a member of the Green Bay Packers practice squad for the entire 1995 NFL season. He did not see any playing time during the regular season. Due to an injury to Aaron Taylor, he was promoted to the active roster before the NFC Championship Game. However, Holt was listed as inactive for the game. Later he played with the London Monarchs of the World League of American Football (WLAF) in 1997.
