= Mike Thompson (American football) =

American football player (born 1971)

No. 95, 93, 96
- Position: Defensive tackle

Personal information
- Born: December 22, 1971 (age 54); Portage, Wisconsin, U.S.
- Listed height: 6 ft 4 in (1.93 m)
- Listed weight: 295 lb (134 kg)

Career information
- High school: Portage
- College: Wisconsin
- NFL draft: 1995: 4th round, 123rd overall pick
- Expansion draft: 1999: 1st round, 35th overall pick

Career history
- Jacksonville Jaguars (1995); Green Bay Packers (1996); Kansas City Chiefs (1997)*; Cincinnati Bengals (1997–1998); Cleveland Browns (1999–2001)
- * Offseason or practice squad member only

Awards and highlights
- First-team All-Big Ten (1994)

Career NFL statistics
- Tackles: 45
- Sacks: 1.5
- Fumble recoveries: 2
- Stats at Pro Football Reference

Mike John Thompson (born December 22, 1971) is an American former professional football player who was a defensive tackle in the National Football League (NFL). He played college football for the Wisconsin Badgers. Thompson was selected by the Jacksonville Jaguars in the fourth round of the 1995 NFL draft and played with that team for a season. The following season, he instead played for the Cincinnati Bengals, but did not see any playing time during the regular season. After playing the following season with the Bengals he played two more with the Cleveland Browns. He was also a member of the Browns during the 2001 NFL season, but once again did not see any playing time.
