= Michael Roan =

American football player (born 1972)

No. 46, 80
- Position: Tight end

Personal information
- Born: August 29, 1972 (age 54); Iowa City, Iowa, U.S.
- Listed height: 6 ft 3 in (1.91 m)
- Listed weight: 251 lb (114 kg)

Career information
- High school: Iowa City
- College: Wisconsin
- NFL draft: 1995: 4th round, 101st overall pick

Career history
- Houston Oilers/Tennessee Titans (1995–2000)

Career NFL statistics
- Receptions: 45
- Receiving yards: 403
- Touchdowns: 4
- Stats at Pro Football Reference

Michael Phillip Roan (born August 29, 1972) is an American former professional football player who was a tight end in the National Football League (NFL). He played college football for the Wisconsin Badgers. He is now a high school teacher, vineyard owner and former football coach.

== Early life and college ==
A graduate and standout athlete at Iowa City High School, Roan played mostly on the defensive line and fullback during his high school days. He also was named to the Iowa 3A All-State Basketball Team in 1990.

He was converted to the tight end position at the University of Wisconsin–Madison, and was a member of the 1994 Rose Bowl championship squad. A key contributor to the turnaround success of the Badgers under Barry Alvarez, Roan earned acclaim as a bookend tight end that was "big, strong and consistent." Roan earned All-Big Ten honors in both his junior and senior seasons, catching 34 passes for the Badgers in 1993.

== Professional career ==
A fourth round selection (101st overall) in the 1995 NFL draft, Roan played all six seasons of his NFL career for the Houston Oilers/Tennessee Titans franchise. Roan was on the Titans roster during their run in 1999 to the AFC Championship. He caught three touchdown passes in his career, all of them during the 1999 season.

He also recovered a fumble for a touchdown against the Pittsburgh Steelers in a 23–14 win in Nashville in November 1998. Playing for the special teams shortly after Al Del Greco kicked a go-ahead field goal with three seconds left, Roan recovered the subsequent fumbled kickoff as time expired.

Injuries began to pile up by the start of the 2000 season, as a recurring neck problem kept Roan out for all of the Titans' 1999 postseason run. It came to a head in the first week of 2000, when Roan's own teammate broke his leg in a blindside collision against Buffalo.

== Personal life ==
After retiring from the NFL, Roan moved to Sonoma wine country in California and bought a vineyard in the Russian River valley. Known today as Roan Family, the vineyard's Pinot Noir grapes are sourced by Screen Door Cellars.

Roan earned a master's degree from the University of San Francisco, as well as a teaching certificate.

Starting his education career as a junior varsity coach, Roan eventually became the head varsity football coach at El Molino High School in Forestville, California until 2011 (when he brought his team to the playoffs). After the 2011 season, Roan passed the job onto J.V. coach Matt Transue.

He currently serves as the physical education teacher and athletic director at Analy High School in Sebastopol, California.
