= Bryan Jurewicz =

American football player (born 1973)

No. 79
- Position: Defensive lineman

Personal information
- Born: Deerfield, Illinois
- Listed height: 6 ft 5 in (1.96 m)
- Listed weight: 285 lb (129 kg)

Career information
- College: University of Wisconsin

Career history
- Carolina Panthers (1997)*; Indianapolis Colts (1998)
- * Offseason or practice squad member only

Awards and highlights
- All-Big Ten (1996)

Bryan Jurewicz (/dʒuːˈrəwɪz/) is a former professional National Football League player who was briefly a member of both the Carolina Panthers and Indianapolis Colts.

Jurewicz was a star lineman at Deerfield High School in Illinois, a starter on the varsity team in 1990 and 1991. He was named as an all-conference player in 1990, and again in 1991, also being named all-area, all-state, and the Gatorade Player of the Year for Illinois football.

He was a starting defensive lineman for the University of Wisconsin Badgers, going directly from red shirt to a starting player in 1993 when his predecessor was injured. He started playing at 6'5" and 240 pounds. In 1994, the sophomore started the season as a rushing linebacker, but was once again moved to defensive line, bulking up by 20 pounds in the process, and playing with the team in the Rose Bowl that year. He deflected 9 passes as a Badgers defensive lineman in 1996, a school record, and he was an Honorable Mention All-Big Ten Conference selection the same year. He made 9 tackles for a loss in his last five games with the Badgers, with UW assistant coach John Palermo calling him "...as good of a defensive lineman as there is in the league".

After graduating from University of Wisconsin, he signed as a free agent with the Panthers in 1997. After being released in August of the same year, he was picked up in February 1998 by the Indianapolis Colts and spent some time on their practice squad; the latter team placed him on waivers after a few months. Most newspapers in 1998 incorrectly listed his position as offensive lineman.

Jurewicz was the president and CEO of GradeBeam, LLC, an online bidding and communication company in the construction industry. GradeBeam was one of Chicago's largest privately held companies before a sale to Textura Corporation and subsequent initial public offering.
