= Derek Engler =

American football player (born 1974)

No. 69
- Position: Center

Personal information
- Born: July 11, 1974 (age 52); Saint Paul, Minnesota
- Listed height: 6 ft 5 in (1.96 m)
- Listed weight: 300 lb (136 kg)

Career information
- High school: Cretin-Derham Hall (Saint Paul, Minnesota)
- College: Wisconsin
- NFL draft: 1997: undrafted

Career history
- New York Giants (1997–2000)

Career NFL statistics
- Games played: 34
- Stats at Pro Football Reference

Derek Engler is a former center in the National Football League. He played four seasons with the New York Giants.
