= Lee DeRamus =

American football player (born 1972)

No. 87
- Position: Wide receiver

Personal information
- Born: August 24, 1972 (age 54); Stratford, New Jersey, U.S.
- Listed height: 6 ft 0 in (1.83 m)
- Listed weight: 205 lb (93 kg)

Career information
- High school: Edgewood Regional (Winslow Township, New Jersey)
- College: Wisconsin
- NFL draft: 1995: 6th round, 184th overall pick

Career history
- New Orleans Saints (1995–1996); Green Bay Packers (1998)*; San Francisco Demons (2001)
- * Offseason or practice squad member only

Awards and highlights
- Second-team All-Big Ten (1993)

Career NFL statistics
- Receptions: 21
- Receiving yards: 258
- Touchdowns: 1
- Rushing yards: 2
- Stats at Pro Football Reference

Lee Collins DeRamus (born August 24, 1972) is an American former professional football player who was a wide receiver in the National Football League (NFL). He played college football for the Wisconsin Badgers and was selected in the sixth round of the 1995 NFL draft and played two seasons with the New Orleans Saints.

Born in Stratford, New Jersey, and raised in Winslow Township, New Jersey, DeRamus attended Edgewood Regional High School.
