= Kenny Gales =

American football player (born 1972)

Profile
- Position: Cornerback

Personal information
- Born: April 1, 1972 (age 54)
- Listed height: 5 ft 11 in (1.80 m)
- Listed weight: 173 lb (78 kg)

Career information
- College: Wisconsin

Career history
- Chicago Bears (1995); Barcelona Dragons (WLAF) (1996)

Kenny Gales (born April 1, 1972) is a former professional American football player. Gales was selected in the sixth round of the 1995 NFL draft and was a member of the Chicago Bears that season, though he did not see any playing time during a regular season game. Later, he played with the Barcelona Dragons of the World League of American Football (WLAF) in 1996.
