= Jason Suttle =

American football player (born 1974)

No. 35
- Position: Defensive back

Personal information
- Born: December 2, 1974 (age 51); Minneapolis, Minnesota
- Listed height: 5 ft 10 in (1.78 m)
- Listed weight: 182 lb (83 kg)

Career information
- High school: Burnsville (Burnsville, Minnesota)
- College: Wisconsin
- NFL draft: 1998: undrafted

Career history
- San Diego Chargers (1998)*; New England Patriots (1998)*; Denver Broncos (1999); Green Bay Packers (2000)*; Denver Broncos (2000); San Francisco 49ers (2001); Houston Texans (2002)*; Green Bay Packers (2002)*
- * Offseason or practice squad member only

Career NFL statistics
- Games played: 11
- Stats at Pro Football Reference

Jason Suttle is a former defensive back in the National Football League. He played two seasons with the Denver Broncos before being a member of the San Francisco 49ers during his final season.
