= Brent Moss =

American football player (1972–2022)

No. 31, 35, 33
- Position: Running back

Personal information
- Born: January 30, 1972; Racine, Wisconsin, U.S.
- Died: November 13, 2022 (aged 50)
- Listed height: 5 ft 9 in (1.75 m)
- Listed weight: 211 lb (96 kg)

Career information
- High school: Washington Park (Racine)
- College: Wisconsin (1991–1994)
- NFL draft: 1995: undrafted

Career history
- Miami Dolphins (1995)*; St. Louis Rams (1995); Amsterdam Admirals (1997); Green Bay Packers (1998)*; Memphis Maniax (2001)
- * Offseason or practice squad member only

Awards and highlights
- Jim Brown Trophy (1993); Second-team All-American (1993); Big Ten Most Valuable Player (1993); Big Ten Offensive Player of the Year (1993); First-team All-Big Ten (1993)

Career NFL statistics
- Rushing yards: 90
- Rushing average: 4.1
- Stats at Pro Football Reference

Brent A. Moss (January 30, 1972 – November 13, 2022) was an American professional football running back who played in the National Football League (NFL) and XFL. He played college football for the Wisconsin Badgers, winning the Big Ten Most Valuable Player and Jim Brown Trophy in 1993. He played for the St. Louis Rams, Amsterdam Admirals and the Memphis Maniax.

== Early life ==
Brent Moss was a 3-year (1986–1989) letter winner in football as tailback at Racine Park High School in Racine, Wisconsin where he wore number 31 and rushed for over 5,000 yards. During the November 12, 1988 Division I Wisconsin WIAA State Football Championship Game, as a junior Moss rushed for 202 yards and 3 touchdowns on the turf of Camp Randall Stadium in Madison, Wisconsin. This led the Racine Park Panthers to a victory over the Superior Spartans 34-14 and the State Football Championship for Wisconsin's highest division. Moss was named the game's MVP and was later named 1st team All-State (WIAA). During the 1989 season at Racine Park, Moss would also be named 1st team All-State (WIAA) and led the Panthers to the state semi-final game.

== College career ==
In the 1993 season the 5 ft 8 in (1.73 m), 205 pounds (93 kg) tailback led the Badgers to a Big Ten Conference title and their first Rose Bowl berth since 1963. The Badgers defeated the #13 UCLA Bruins 21–16 to claim their first ever Rose Bowl victory. Moss was a big part of the win, rushing for 158 yards and two touchdowns en route to being honored the game's MVP. He was also voted the Big Ten's most valuable player that year and was the recipient of the Silver Football, awarded by the Chicago Tribune as the Big Ten's player of the year for 1993.

- 1991: Ran for 219 yards and one touchdown on 61 carries.
- 1992: Ran for 739 yards and 9 TD on 165 carries.
- 1993: Ran for 1,637 yards and 16 TD on 312 carries.
- 1994: Ran for 833 yards and 8 TD on 156 carries.

== Professional career ==
Pre-draft measurables
Height	Weight	Arm length	Hand span	40-yard dash	10-yard split	20-yard split	20-yard shuttle	Vertical jump	Broad jump	Bench press
5 ft 8 1/2 in (1.74 m)	211 lb (96 kg)	31 3/4 in (0.81 m)	9 5/8 in (0.24 m)	4.74 s	1.72 s	2.79 s	4.35 s	29.0 in (0.74 m)	9 ft 0 in (2.74 m)	19 reps

Although undrafted in the 1995 NFL draft, he was invited to the Miami Dolphins training camp. He was cut by the Dolphins, and then signed with the St. Louis Rams in the 1995 season, accumulating 90 yards on 22 carries. This was his only playing time in the National Football League, as he was released by the Rams during the team's 1996 summer training camp. This was followed by a brief off season stint with the Green Bay Packers in 1997 and brief stints in the World League of American Football, Arena Football League and XFL.

== Personal life and death ==
In 1994, Moss pleaded guilty to a misdemeanor charge of possession of cocaine and was sentenced to two years' probation and a $250 fine. In 2005, he pleaded guilty to misdemeanor possession of cocaine, felony bail jumping, and misdemeanor resisting or obstructing an officer. In 2017, he was sentenced to one year in prison and one year on extended supervision on a felony possession of cocaine charge, and three years probation for delivering heroin in amount of 3 grams or less.

Moss died on November 13, 2022, at the age of 50.
