= 1993 Stanford Cardinal football team =

American college football season

1993 Stanford Cardinal football
- Conference: Pacific-10 Conference
- Record: 4–7 (2–6 Pac-10)
- Head coach: Bill Walsh (4th season)
- Offensive coordinator: Terry Shea (2nd season)
- Offensive scheme: West Coast
- Defensive coordinator: Fred von Appen (4th season)
- Base defense: 4–3
- Home stadium: Stanford Stadium

1993 Pacific-10 Conference football standings
	Conf.					Overall
Team	W		L		T	W		L		T
No. 10 Arizona +	6	–	2	–	0	10	–	2	–	0
No. 18 UCLA +	6	–	2	–	0	8	–	4	–	0
USC +	6	–	2	–	0	8	–	5	–	0
Washington	5	–	3	–	0	7	–	4	–	0
No. 25 California	4	–	4	–	0	9	–	4	–	0
Arizona State	4	–	4	–	0	6	–	5	–	0
Washington State	3	–	5	–	0	5	–	6	–	0
Oregon	2	–	6	–	0	5	–	6	–	0
Oregon State	2	–	6	–	0	4	–	7	–	0
Stanford	2	–	6	–	0	4	–	7	–	0
+ – Conference co-champions; Rankings from AP Poll

The 1993 Stanford Cardinal football team represented Stanford University as a member of the Pacific-10 Conference (Pac-10) during 1993 NCAA Division I-A football season. Led by fourth-year head coach Bill Walsh, the Cardinal compiled an overall record of 4–7 with a mark of 2–6 in conference play, placing in a three-way tie for eighth at the bottom of the Pac-10 standings. The team played home games at Stanford Stadium in Stanford, California.

== Schedule ==
Date	Time	Opponent	Rank	Site	TV	Result	Attendance
September 4	12:30 p.m.	at No. 12 Washington	No. 15	Husky Stadium; Seattle, WA	ABC	L 14–31	71,893
September 11		San Jose State*	No. 23	Stanford Stadium; Stanford, CA (rivalry)		W 31–28	47,500
September 18		No. 7 Colorado*	No. 20	Stanford Stadium; Stanford, CA	ESPN	W 41–37	52,100
September 25	12:30 p.m.	UCLA	No. 17	Stanford Stadium; Stanford, CA (rivalry)	ABC	L 25–28	53,700
October 2	12:30 p.m.	No. 4 Notre Dame*		Stanford Stadium; Stanford, CA (rivalry)	ABC	L 20–48	80,300
October 16	3:30 p.m.	at No. 11 Arizona		Arizona Stadium; Tucson, AZ	Prime	L 24–27	57,799
October 23		Arizona State		Stanford Stadium; Stanford, CA		L 30–38	46,500
October 30		Oregon State		Stanford Stadium; Stanford, CA		W 31–27	42,000
November 6	3:30 p.m.	at USC		Los Angeles Memorial Coliseum; Los Angeles, CA (rivalry)	Prime	L 20–45	59,376
November 13	1:00 p.m.	at Oregon		Autzen Stadium; Eugene, OR (rivalry)	Prime	W 38–34	31,214
November 20		California		Stanford Stadium; Stanford, CA (Big Game)		L 17–46	82,500
*Non-conference game; Rankings from AP Poll released prior to the game; All times are in Pacific time

== Roster ==
1993 Stanford Cardinal football team roster
Players
Coaches
Offense

Pos.	#	Name	Class
WR	80	Justin Armour	Jr
TE	87	Tony Cline	Jr
QB	5	Scott Frost	Fr
QB	18	Steve Stenstrom	Jr

Defense

Pos.	#	Name	Class
CB	4	Vaughn Bryant	Jr
DB		Kwame Ellis	So
DT	72	Jason Fisk	Jr
LB	95	Coy Gibbs	Jr

Special teams

Pos.	#	Name	Class

Head coach

- Bill Walsh

Coordinators/assistant coaches

- Terry Shea – Offensive coordinator and assistant head coach
- Bill Singler – Running backs
- Mike Wilson – wide receivers and tight ends
- Monte Clark – Offensive line
- Doug Cosbie – Assistant offensive line
- Fred von Appen – Defensive coordinator and Inside linebacker
- Dave Tipton – Defensive line
- Keena Turner – Outside linebacker
- Tom Holmoe – Defensive backs

Legend

- (C) Team captain
- (S) Suspended
- (I) Ineligible
- Injured
- Redshirt
