= 1992 Stanford Cardinal football team =

American college football season

1992 Stanford Cardinal football

Pac-10 co-champion Blockbuster Bowl champion

Blockbuster Bowl, W 24–3 vs. Penn State
- Conference: Pacific-10 Conference

Ranking
- Coaches: No. 9
- AP: No. 9
- Record: 10–3 (6–2 Pac-10)
- Head coach: Bill Walsh (3rd season)
- Offensive coordinator: Terry Shea (1st season)
- Offensive scheme: West Coast
- Defensive coordinator: Fred von Appen (3rd season)
- Base defense: 4–3
- Home stadium: Stanford Stadium

1992 Pacific-10 Conference football standings
	Conf.					Overall
Team	W		L		T	W		L		T
No. 11 Washington +	6	–	2	–	0	9	–	3	–	0
No. 9 Stanford +	6	–	2	–	0	10	–	3	–	0
No. 15 Washington State	5	–	3	–	0	9	–	3	–	0
USC	5	–	3	–	0	6	–	5	–	1
Arizona	4	–	3	–	1	6	–	5	–	1
Arizona State	4	–	4	–	0	6	–	5	–	0
Oregon	4	–	4	–	0	6	–	6	–	0
UCLA	3	–	5	–	0	6	–	5	–	0
California	2	–	6	–	0	4	–	7	–	0
Oregon State	0	–	7	–	1	1	–	9	–	1
+ – Conference co-champions; Rankings from AP Poll

The 1992 Stanford Cardinal football team represented Stanford University as a member of the Pacific-10 Conference (Pac-10) during the 1992 NCAA Division I-A football season. Led by third-year head coach Bill Walsh, who returned after having coached Stanford in 1977 and 1978, the Cardinal compiled an overall record of 10–3 with a mark of 6–2 in conference play, sharing the Pac-10 title with Washington. Stanford was invited to the Blockbuster Bowl, were the Cardinal defeated Penn State. The team played home games at Stanford Stadium in Stanford, California.

== Schedule ==
Date	Opponent	Rank	Site	TV	Result	Attendance	Source
August 26	vs. No. 7 Texas A&M*	No. 17	Anaheim Stadium; Anaheim, CA (Pigskin Classic)	Raycom	L 7–10	35,240	
September 12	Oregon	No. 21	Stanford Stadium; Stanford, CA (rivalry)		W 21–7	43,656	
September 19	Northwestern*	No. 18	Stanford Stadium; Stanford, CA		W 35–24	42,198	
September 26	San Jose State*	No. 19	Stanford Stadium; Stanford, CA (rivalry)		W 37–13	56,423	
October 3	at No. 6 Notre Dame*	No. 18	Notre Dame Stadium; Notre Dame, IN (rivalry)	NBC	W 33–16	59,075	
October 10	at No. 19 UCLA	No. 11	Rose Bowl; Pasadena, CA (rivalry)		W 19–7	55,810	
October 17	Arizona	No. 8	Stanford Stadium; Stanford, CA		L 6–21	47,217	
October 24	at Oregon State	No. 16	Parker Stadium; Corvallis, OR		W 27–21	26,594	
October 31	at No. 2 Washington	No. 15	Husky Stadium; Seattle, WA	ABC	L 7–41	70,821	
November 7	No. 11 USC	No. 21	Stanford Stadium; Stanford, CA (rivalry)	Prime	W 23–9	72,571	
November 14	No. 21 Washington State	No. 15	Stanford Stadium; Stanford, CA	Prime	W 40–3	52,018	
November 21	at California	No. 14	Memorial Stadium; Berkeley, CA (Big Game)		W 41–21	75,662	
January 1, 1993	vs. No. 21 Penn State*	No. 13	Joe Robbie Stadium; Miami Gardens, FL (Blockbuster Bowl)	CBS	W 24–3	45,554	
*Non-conference game; Rankings from AP Poll released prior to the game; Source:

== Game summaries ==
=== California ===
Team	1	2	3	4	Total
• Stanford	6	14	14	7	41
California	3	0	0	18	21

- Date: November 21
- Location: Memorial Stadium
- Game attendance: 75,662

Scoring summary
Q1	CAL	Brien 43 yard field goal	CAL 3–0
Q1	STAN	Armour 46 yard pass from Stenstrom (kick failed)	STAN 6–3
Q2	STAN	Armour 11 yard pass from Stenstrom (Abrams kick)	STAN 13–3
Q2	STAN	Roberts 2 yard run (Abrams kick)	STAN 20–3
Q3	STAN	Lasley 9 yard pass from Stenstrom (Abrams kick)	STAN 27–3
Q3	STAN	Milburn 76 yard punt return (Abrams kick)	STAN 34–3
Q4	CAL	Dawkins 50 yard pass from Barr (pass failed)	STAN 34–9
Q4	STAN	Roberts 5 yard run (Abrams kick)	STAN 41–9
Q4	CAL	Dawkins 14 yard pass from Barr (pass failed)	STAN 41–15
Q4	CAL	Caldwell 9 yard pass from Barr (pass failed)	STAN 41–21

- Stanford wins share of Pac-10 title

== Roster ==
1992 Stanford Cardinal football team roster
Players
Coaches
Offense

Pos.	#	Name	Class
WR	80	Justin Armour	So
OL	76	Jeff Bailey	Sr
WR	89	David Calomese	Sr
G	65	Brian Cassidy	Sr
C	54	Glen Cavanaugh	Sr
TE	87	Tony Cline
WR	81	Mike Cook	Sr
G	50	Chris Dalman	Sr
OT	75	Steve Hoyem	Sr
RB	5	Glyn Milburn	Sr
QB	18	Steve Stenstrom	Jr
TE	86	Ryan Wetnight	Sr

Defense

Pos.	#	Name	Class
FS	16	Seyon Albert	Sr
DT	51	Estevan Avila	Sr
CB	4	Vaughn Bryant	Jr
DB		Kwame Ellis	Fr
DT	72	Jason Fisk	Jr
LB	42	Dave Garnett	Sr
LB	29	Ron George	Sr
LB	95	Coy Gibbs	So
CB	21	Darrien Gordon	Sr
SS	17	John Lynch	Sr
DT	60	Tyrone Parker	Sr
LB	36	Tom Williams	Sr

Special teams

Pos.	#	Name	Class

Head coach

- Bill Walsh

Coordinators/assistant coaches

- Terry Shea – Offensive coordinator and assistant head coach
- Bill Ring – Running backs
- Mike Wilson – wide receivers and tight ends
- Scott Schuhmann – Offensive line
- Fred von Appen – Defensive coordinator and Inside linebacker
- Dave Tipton – Defensive line
- Keena Turner – Outside linebacker
- Tom Holmoe – Defensive backs
- Bill Singler – Special teams coordinator

Legend

- (C) Team captain
- (S) Suspended
- (I) Ineligible
- Injured
- Redshirt
