= 1992 Oregon State Beavers football team =

American college football season

1992 Oregon State Beavers football
- Conference: Pacific-10 Conference
- Record: 1–9–1 (0–7–1 Pac-10)
- Head coach: Jerry Pettibone (2nd season)
- Offensive coordinator: Mike Summers (2nd season)
- Offensive scheme: Multiple
- Defensive coordinator: Rocky Long (2nd season)
- Base defense: 3–3–5
- Home stadium: Parker Stadium

1992 Pacific-10 Conference football standings
	Conf.					Overall
Team	W		L		T	W		L		T
No. 11 Washington +	6	–	2	–	0	9	–	3	–	0
No. 9 Stanford +	6	–	2	–	0	10	–	3	–	0
No. 15 Washington State	5	–	3	–	0	9	–	3	–	0
USC	5	–	3	–	0	6	–	5	–	1
Arizona	4	–	3	–	1	6	–	5	–	1
Arizona State	4	–	4	–	0	6	–	5	–	0
Oregon	4	–	4	–	0	6	–	6	–	0
UCLA	3	–	5	–	0	6	–	5	–	0
California	2	–	6	–	0	4	–	7	–	0
Oregon State	0	–	7	–	1	1	–	9	–	1
+ – Conference co-champions; Rankings from AP Poll

The 1992 Oregon State Beavers football team represented Oregon State University in the Pacific-10 Conference (Pac-10) during the 1992 NCAA Division I-A football season. In their second season under head coach Jerry Pettibone, the Beavers compiled a 1–9–1 record (0–7–1 against Pac-10 opponents), finished in last place in the Pac-10, and were outscored by their opponents, 363 to 163. The team played its home games at Parker Stadium in Corvallis, Oregon.

== Schedule ==
Date	Opponent	Site	Result	Attendance	Source
September 5	Kansas*	Parker Stadium; Corvallis, OR	L 20–49	28,591	
September 12	Fresno State*	Parker Stadium; Corvallis, OR	W 46–36	22,326	
September 19	Arizona	Parker Stadium; Corvallis, OR	T 14–14	25,187	
September 26	at Utah*	Robert Rice Stadium; Salt Lake City, UT	L 9–42	32,298	
October 3	at California	California Memorial Stadium; Berkeley, CA	L 0–42	46,500	
October 10	Washington State	Parker Stadium; Corvallis, OR	L 10–35	30,459	
October 17	at Arizona State	Sun Devil Stadium; Tempe, AZ	L 13–40	39,278	
October 24	No. 16 Stanford	Parker Stadium; Corvallis, OR	L 21–27	26,594	
November 7	at UCLA	Rose Bowl; Pasadena, CA	L 14–26	32,513	
November 14	at No. 6 Washington	Husky Stadium; Seattle, WA	L 16–45	70,149	
November 21	Oregon	Parker Stadium; Corvallis, OR (Civil War)	L 0–7	35,547	
*Non-conference game; Rankings from AP Poll released prior to the game

== Personnel ==
1992 Oregon State Beavers football team roster
Players
Coaches
Offense

Pos.	#	Name	Class
OL		Adam Albaugh
RB		Jason Barry
WR		Kenyan Branscomb
OL		Jim Buchanan
LT		Tim Camp	Fr
OL		Jason Downs
OL		Johnny Feigna
OL		John Garrett
OL		Fletcher Keister
QB		Mark Olford
RB		Dwayne Owens
RB		Chad Paulson
TE		Ray Penniman
RB		Cameron Reynolds
QB		Don Shanklin
QB		Ian Shields	Jr
RB		J.D. Stewart
WR		Kevin Strasser
RB		Curtis Willis
WR		Maurice Wilson
RB		J.J. Young
RB		John Young

Defense

Pos.	#	Name	Class
DB		Herschel Currie
DB		Zechariah Davis
DL		Chad De Sully
DB		William Ephraim
DL		Rickey Fizer
DL		Eric Hale
DB		Michael Hale
LB		Cory Huot
DL		Alai Kalaniuvalu
LB		Tony O'Billovich
LB		Rico Petrini
DL		Sailusi Poulivaati
LB		Kane Rogers
DB		Reggie Tongue

Special teams

Pos.	#	Name	Class
K		Jamie Burke
P		Tim Kollas

Head coach

- Jerry Pettibone

Coordinators/assistant coaches

Legend

- (C) Team captain
- (S) Suspended
- (I) Ineligible
- Injured
- Redshirt

== Season summary ==
=== Oregon ===
Oregon Ducks (5–6) at Oregon State Beavers (1–8–1)

Quarter	1	2	3	4	Total
Oregon	0	7	0	0	7
Oregon St	0	0	0	0	0

at Parker Stadium, Corvallis, Oregon

- Date: November 21, 1992
- Game weather: Rain
- Game attendance: 35,547
- TV: Prime
- Eugene Register-Guard. 1992 Nov 22.

Game information

Second quarter

- ORE – Willy Tate 3-yard pass from Danny O'Neil (Tommy Thompson kick), 0:35. Oregon 7–0. Drive: 6 plays, 22 yards.

Top passers

- ORE – Danny O'Neil – 8/16, 80 yards, TD
- OSU – Ian Shields – 1/3, 11 yards; Mark Olford – 1/1, 11 yards

Top rushers

- ORE – Ricky Whittle – 11 rushes, 66 yards
- OSU – Dwayne Owens – 3 rushes, 29 yards

Top receivers

- ORE – Sean Burwell – 3 receptions, 33 yards
- OSU – Kevin Strasser – 1 receptions, 11 yards; Maurice Wilson – 1 reception, 11 yards
