= 1992 UCLA Bruins football team =

American college football season

1992 UCLA Bruins football
- Conference: Pacific-10 Conference
- Record: 6–5 (3–5 Pac-10)
- Head coach: Terry Donahue (17th season)
- Offensive coordinator: Homer Smith (12th season)
- Defensive coordinator: Bob Field (11th season)
- Home stadium: Rose Bowl

1992 Pacific-10 Conference football standings
	Conf.					Overall
Team	W		L		T	W		L		T
No. 11 Washington +	6	–	2	–	0	9	–	3	–	0
No. 9 Stanford +	6	–	2	–	0	10	–	3	–	0
No. 15 Washington State	5	–	3	–	0	9	–	3	–	0
USC	5	–	3	–	0	6	–	5	–	1
Arizona	4	–	3	–	1	6	–	5	–	1
Arizona State	4	–	4	–	0	6	–	5	–	0
Oregon	4	–	4	–	0	6	–	6	–	0
UCLA	3	–	5	–	0	6	–	5	–	0
California	2	–	6	–	0	4	–	7	–	0
Oregon State	0	–	7	–	1	1	–	9	–	1
+ – Conference co-champions; Rankings from AP Poll

The 1992 UCLA Bruins football team represented the University of California, Los Angeles (UCLA) as a member of the Pacific-10 Conference (Pac-10) during the 1992 NCAA Division I-A football season. Led by 17th-year head coach Terry Donahue, the Bruins compiled an overall record of 6–5 with a mark of 3–5 in conference play, placing eighth in the Pac-10. UCLA played home games at the Rose Bowl in Pasadena, California.

== Schedule ==
Date	Time	Opponent	Rank	Site	TV	Result	Attendance	Source
September 12	7:00 pm	Cal State Fullerton*	No. 16	Rose Bowl; Pasadena, CA	PSN	W 37–14	37,965	
September 19	11:00 am	at BYU*	No. 15	Cougar Stadium; Provo, UT		W 17–10	65,761	
September 26	12:30 pm	No. 21 San Diego State*	No. 11	Rose Bowl; Pasadena, CA	ABC	W 35–7	51,501	
October 3	7:00 pm	at Arizona	No. 11	Arizona Stadium; Tucson, AZ	PSN	L 3–23	50,708	
October 10	7:30 pm	No. 11 Stanford	No. 19	Rose Bowl; Pasadena, CA (rivalry)		L 7–19	55,810	
October 17	12:30 pm	at No. 22 Washington State		Martin Stadium; Pullman, WA	ABC	L 17–30	32,208	
October 24	7:00 pm	Arizona State		Rose Bowl; Pasadena, CA	PSN	L 0–20	37,204	
October 31	12:30 pm	at California		California Memorial Stadium; Berkeley, CA (rivalry)		L 12–48	56,000	
November 7	3:30 pm	Oregon State		Rose Bowl; Pasadena, CA		W 26–14	32,513	
November 14	1:00 pm	at Oregon		Autzen Stadium; Eugene, OR		W 9–6	33,771	
November 21	4:30 pm	No. 15 USC		Rose Bowl; Pasadena, CA (Victory Bell)	ESPN	W 38–37	80,568	
*Non-conference game; Rankings from AP Poll released prior to the game; All times are in Pacific time; Source:

== Roster ==
1992 UCLA Bruins football team roster
Players
Coaches
Offense

Pos.	#	Name	Class
WR	14	Brent Brennan	So
QB	15	Wayne Cook	So
C	58	Mike Flanagan	Fr
WR	4	Kevin Jordan	Fr
OT	79	Jonathan Ogden	Fr
G	68	Vaughn Parker	Jr
WR	18	J. J. Stokes	So

Defense

Pos.	#	Name	Class
LB		Arnold Ale
LB	23	Donnie Edwards	Fr
CB	21	Carl Greenwood	So
LB	95	Jamir Miller	Jr

Special teams

Pos.	#	Name	Class

Head coach

- Terry Donahue

Coordinators/assistant coaches

Legend

- (C) Team captain
- (S) Suspended
- (I) Ineligible
- Injured
- Redshirt

== Game summaries ==
=== USC ===
Team	1	2	3	4	Total
USC	10	7	14	6	37
• UCLA	10	7	0	21	38

- Date: November 21
- Location: Rose Bowl
- Game attendance: 80,568

Scoring summary
Q1		USC	Ford 36 yard field goal	USC 3–0
Q1		UCLA	K. Williams 18 yard run (Perez kick)	UCLA 7–3
Q1		UCLA	Perez 47 yard field goal	UCLA 10–3
Q1		USC	Johnson 36 yard pass from Conway (Ford kick)	Tie 10–10
Q2		UCLA	Stokes 57 yard pass from Barnes (Perez kick)	UCLA 17–10
Q2		USC	Johnson 1 yard run (Ford kick)	Tie 17–17
Q3		USC	Luizzi recovered blocked punt in end zone (Ford kick)	USC 24–17
Q3		USC	Crayton 32 yard run (Ford kick)	USC 31–17
Q4		UCLA	Stokes 29 yard pass from Barnes (Perez kick)	USC 31–24
Q4	7:06	UCLA	K. Williams 1 yard run (Perez kick)	Tie 31–31
Q4	3:08	UCLA	Stokes 90 yard pass from Barnes (Perez kick)	UCLA 38–31
Q4	0:41	USC	Johnson 1 yard run (pass failed)	UCLA 38–37

- Barnes 16/28, 385 Yds
- Stokes 6 Rec, 263 Yds

== Awards and honors ==
- All-Americans: Carlton Gray (CB, consensus), Vaughn Parker (OT, second team)
- All-Conference First Team: Carlton Gray (CB), Vaughn Parker (OT)
