= 1993 Washington Huskies football team =

American college football season

1993 Washington Huskies football
- Conference: Pacific-10 Conference
- Record: 7–4 (5–3 Pac-10)
- Head coach: Jim Lambright (1st season)
- Offensive coordinator: Jeff Woodruff (1st season)
- Defensive coordinator: Jim Lambright (16th season)
- MVP: Napoleon Kaufman
- Captains: Matt Jones; Jim Nevelle; Andy Mason; Jamal Fountaine
- Home stadium: Husky Stadium

1993 Pacific-10 Conference football standings
	Conf.					Overall
Team	W		L		T	W		L		T
No. 10 Arizona +	6	–	2	–	0	10	–	2	–	0
No. 18 UCLA +	6	–	2	–	0	8	–	4	–	0
USC +	6	–	2	–	0	8	–	5	–	0
Washington	5	–	3	–	0	7	–	4	–	0
No. 25 California	4	–	4	–	0	9	–	4	–	0
Arizona State	4	–	4	–	0	6	–	5	–	0
Washington State	3	–	5	–	0	5	–	6	–	0
Oregon	2	–	6	–	0	5	–	6	–	0
Oregon State	2	–	6	–	0	4	–	7	–	0
Stanford	2	–	6	–	0	4	–	7	–	0
+ – Conference co-champions; Rankings from AP Poll

The 1993 Washington Huskies football team was an American football team that represented the University of Washington during the 1993 NCAA Division I-A football season. In its first season under head coach Jim Lambright, the team compiled a 7–4 record, finished in fourth place in the Pacific-10 Conference, and outscored its opponents by a combined total of 288 to 198. The team was not bowl-eligible, due to Pacific-10 conference sanctions.

With its two starting quarterbacks from 1992 selected in the 1993 NFL draft, the Huskies were led by sophomore Damon Huard and junior Eric Bjornson. Halfback Napoleon Kaufman was selected as the team's most valuable player. Jamal Fountaine, Matt Jones, Andy Mason, and Jim Nevelle were the team captains.

Entering his 19th season as head coach of the Huskies, Don James retired on August 22, following the announcement of sanctions by the Pac-10, which included a two-year bowl ban. Defensive coordinator Lambright was quickly named the head coach.

Comedian and actor Joel McHale played as tight end on the scout team at Washington during the 1992 and 1993 seasons.

== Schedule ==
Date	Time	Opponent	Rank	Site	TV	Result	Attendance
September 4	12:30 p.m.	No. 15 Stanford	No. 12	Husky Stadium; Seattle, WA	ABC	W 31–14	71,893
September 11	5:00 p.m.	at No. 16 Ohio State*	No. 12	Ohio Stadium; Columbus, OH	ABC	L 12–21	94,109
September 25	12:30 p.m.	East Carolina*	No. 16	Husky Stadium; Seattle, WA		W 35–0	72,108
October 2	12:30 p.m.	San Jose State*	No. 15	Husky Stadium; Seattle, WA		W 52–17	67,976
October 9	12:30 p.m.	at No. 16 California	No. 13	California Memorial Stadium; Berkeley, CA	ABC	W 24–23	55,000
October 16	12:30 p.m.	at No. 22 UCLA	No. 12	Rose Bowl; Pasadena, CA	ABC	L 25–39	40,830
October 23	12:30 p.m.	Oregon	No. 22	Husky Stadium; Seattle, WA (rivalry)		W 21–6	72,534
October 30	3:30 p.m.	at Arizona State	No. 19	Sun Devil Stadium; Tempe, AZ	Prime	L 17–32	48,116
November 6	1:00 p.m.	at Oregon State		Parker Stadium; Corvallis, OR		W 28–21	33,944
November 13	12:30 p.m.	USC	No. 25	Husky Stadium; Seattle, WA	ABC	L 17–22	72,202
November 20	12:30 p.m.	Washington State		Husky Stadium; Seattle, WA (Apple Cup)		W 26–3	72,688
*Non-conference game; Rankings from AP Poll released prior to the game; All times are in Pacific time

== Game summaries ==
=== California ===
Team	1	2	3	4	Total
• Washington	3	0	7	14	24
California	10	10	3	0	23

- Date: October 9
- Location: California Memorial Stadium
- Game attendance: 55,000

Scoring summary
Q1	CAL	Caldwell 25 yard pass from Barr (Brien kick)	CAL 7–0
Q1	WASH	Hanson 36 yard field goal	CAL 7–3
Q1	CAL	Brien 23 yard field goal	CAL 10–3
Q2	CAL	Brien 52 yard field goal	CAL 13–3
Q2	CAL	Holly 5 yard pass from Barr (Brien kick)	CAL 20–3
Q3	CAL	Brien 32 yard field goal	CAL 23–3
Q3	WASH	Kaufman 4 yard run (Hanson kick)	CAL 23–10
Q4	WASH	McCarthy 29 yard pass from Huard (Hanson kick)	CAL 23–17
Q4	WASH	Breuner 7 yard pass from Huard (Hanson kick)	WASH 24–23

== Roster ==
1993 Washington Huskies football team roster
Players
Coaches
Offense

Pos.	#	Name	Class
SE, QB	14	Eric Bjornson	Jr
TE	85	Mark Bruener	Jr
RB	29	Beno Bryant	Sr
TE	82	Ernie Conwell	So
OT	66	Tom Gallagher	Sr
G	65	Frank Garcia	Jr
SE	3	Theron Hill	So
QB	7	Damon Huard	So
RB	24	Eteka Huckaby	Jr
FB	22	Matt Jones (C)	Sr
RB	8	Napoleon Kaufman	Jr
SE	9	Joe Kralik	Sr
TE	84	Joel McHale	So
C	52	Jim Nevelle (C)	Sr
OT	71	Pete Pierson	Sr
G	60	Andrew Peterson	Jr
SE	18	Jason Shelley	So

Defense

Pos.	#	Name	Class
LB	45	Hillary Butler	Sr
DT	75	D'Marco Farr	Sr
DE	47	Jamal Fountaine (C)	Sr
NT	91	Steve Hoffmann	So
ROV	35	David Killpatrick	Jr
FS	25	Lamar Lyons	Jr
DE	13	Andy Mason (C)	Sr
CB	7	Josh Moore	Jr
CB	4	Reggie Reser	So
LB	52	Donovan Schmidt	Jr
LB	49	Steve Springstead	Sr

Special teams

Pos.	#	Name	Class
PK	4	Travis Hanson	Sr
PK	97	Jason Crabbe	Sr
P	16	John Werdel	Sr

Head coach

- Jim Lambright (1st year)
  (also DC, LB)

Coordinators/assistant coaches

- Jeff Woodruff (OC, QB)
- Dick Baird (WR)
- Miles Corrigan (TE)
- Randy Hart (DL)
- Al Lavan (RB)
- Ron Milus (CB)
- Steve Morton (OL)
- Chris Tormey (S)
- Wayne Dickens (GA)
- Rick Mallory (GA)

Legend

- (C) Team captain
- (S) Suspended
- (I) Ineligible
- Injured
- Redshirt

== NFL draft selections ==
One Washington player was selected in the 1994 NFL draft:

Player	Position	Round	Pick	NFL club
Pete Pierson	OT	5	136	Tampa Bay Buccaneers

- This draft was seven rounds, with 222 selections

Defensive tackle D'Marco Farr was undrafted, but played seven seasons with the Los Angeles/St. Louis Rams, which included a Super Bowl win and a Pro Bowl selection.
