= 1993 Oregon State Beavers football team =

American college football season

1993 Oregon State Beavers football
- Conference: Pacific-10 Conference
- Record: 4–7 (2–6 Pac-10)
- Head coach: Jerry Pettibone (3rd season)
- Offensive coordinator: Mike Summers (3rd season)
- Offensive scheme: Multiple
- Defensive coordinator: Rocky Long (3rd season)
- Base defense: 3–3–5
- Home stadium: Parker Stadium

1993 Pacific-10 Conference football standings
	Conf.					Overall
Team	W		L		T	W		L		T
No. 10 Arizona +	6	–	2	–	0	10	–	2	–	0
No. 18 UCLA +	6	–	2	–	0	8	–	4	–	0
USC +	6	–	2	–	0	8	–	5	–	0
Washington	5	–	3	–	0	7	–	4	–	0
No. 25 California	4	–	4	–	0	9	–	4	–	0
Arizona State	4	–	4	–	0	6	–	5	–	0
Washington State	3	–	5	–	0	5	–	6	–	0
Oregon	2	–	6	–	0	5	–	6	–	0
Oregon State	2	–	6	–	0	4	–	7	–	0
Stanford	2	–	6	–	0	4	–	7	–	0
+ – Conference co-champions; Rankings from AP Poll

The 1993 Oregon State Beavers football team represented Oregon State University in the Pacific-10 Conference (Pac-10) during the 1993 NCAA Division I-A football season. In their third season under head coach Jerry Pettibone, the Beavers compiled a 4–7 record (2–6 against Pac-10 opponents), finished in a tie for last place in the Pac-10, and were outscored by their opponents, 294 to 224. The team played its home games at Parker Stadium in Corvallis, Oregon.

== Schedule ==
Date	Opponent	Site	Result	Attendance
September 4	at Wyoming*	War Memorial Stadium; Laramie, WY	W 27–16	22,923
September 11	at Fresno State*	Bulldog Stadium; Fresno, CA	L 30–48	40,048
September 18	at Washington State	Martin Stadium; Pullman, WA	L 6–51	24,682
September 25	No. 15 Arizona	Parker Stadium; Corvallis, OR	L 0–33	27,215
October 2	Arizona State	Parker Stadium; Corvallis, OR	W 30–14	24,865
October 9	Pacific (CA)*	Parker Stadium; Corvallis, OR	W 42–7	28,349
October 16	at USC	Los Angeles Memorial Coliseum; Los Angeles, CA	L 9–34	44,363
October 23	No. 19 UCLA	Parker Stadium; Corvallis, OR	L 17–20	30,108
October 30	at Stanford	Stanford Stadium; Stanford, CA	L 27–31	42,000
November 6	Washington	Parker Stadium; Corvallis, OR	L 21–28	33,944
November 20	at Oregon	Autzen Stadium; Eugene, OR (Civil War)	W 15–12	42,267
*Non-conference game; Rankings from AP Poll released prior to the game

== Personnel ==
1993 Oregon State Beavers football team roster
Players
Coaches
Offense

Pos.	#	Name	Class
LT		Tim Camp	So
QB		Rahim Muhammad
RB		Chad Paulson	Sr
QB		Ian Shields	Sr
RB		J.J. Young

Defense

Pos.	#	Name	Class
DB		Herschel Currie

Special teams

Pos.	#	Name	Class
K		Brooke Knight

Head coach

- Jerry Pettibone

Coordinators/assistant coaches

Legend

- (C) Team captain
- (S) Suspended
- (I) Ineligible
- Injured
- Redshirt

== Season summary ==
=== Oregon ===
Oregon State Beavers (3–7) at Oregon Ducks

Quarter	1	2	3	4	Total
Oregon St	7	0	0	8	15
Oregon	3	0	9	0	12

at Autzen Stadium, Eugene, Oregon

- Date: November 20, 1993
- Eugene Register-Guard, 21 Nov 1993.

Game information

First quarter

- OSU – Herschel Currie 45-yard interception return (Brooke Knight kick), 13:35. Oregon St 7–0.
- ORE – Tommy Thompson 37-yard field goal, 5:45. Oregon St 7–3. Drive: 11 plays, 65 yards.

Third quarter

- ORE – Tommy Thompson 27-yard field goal, 10:47. Oregon St 7–6. Drive: 7 plays, 44 yards.
- ORE – Dwayne Jones 1-yard run (pass failed), 3:18. Oregon 12–7. Drive: 9 plays, 74 yards.

Fourth quarter

- OSU – J.J. Young 2-yard run (run good), 3:50. Oregon St 15–12. Drive: 6 plays, 24 yards.

Top passers

- OSU – Rahim Muhammad – 1/3, 16 yards
- ORE – Danny O'Neil – 15/34, 187 yards, INT

Top rushers

- OSU – Rahim Muhammad – 25 rushes, 85 yards
- ORE – Sean Burwell – 3 rushes, 15 yards

Top receivers

- OSU – Chris Cross – 1 reception, 16 yards
- ORE – Derrick Deadwiler – 6 receptions, 92 yarfds
