= 1992 Washington State Cougars football team =

American college football season

1992 Washington State Cougars football
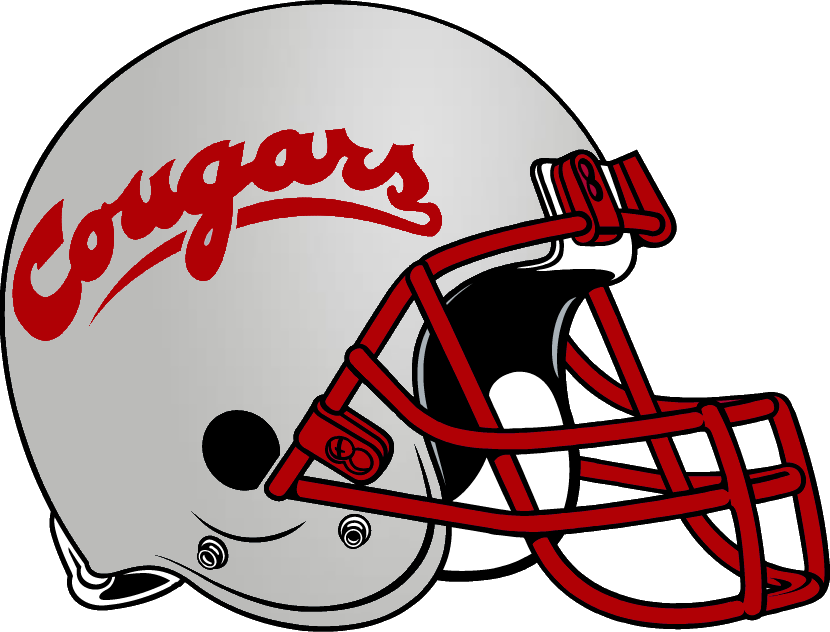

Copper Bowl champion

Copper Bowl, W 31–28 vs. Utah
- Conference: Pacific-10 Conference

Ranking
- Coaches: No. 17
- AP: No. 15
- Record: 9–3 (5–3 Pac-10)
- Head coach: Mike Price (4th season)
- Offensive coordinator: Ted Williams (1st season)
- Offensive scheme: Spread
- Defensive coordinator: Mike Zimmer (4th season)
- Base defense: 4–3
- Home stadium: Martin Stadium

1992 Pacific-10 Conference football standings
	Conf.					Overall
Team	W		L		T	W		L		T
No. 11 Washington +	6	–	2	–	0	9	–	3	–	0
No. 9 Stanford +	6	–	2	–	0	10	–	3	–	0
No. 15 Washington State	5	–	3	–	0	9	–	3	–	0
USC	5	–	3	–	0	6	–	5	–	1
Arizona	4	–	3	–	1	6	–	5	–	1
Arizona State	4	–	4	–	0	6	–	5	–	0
Oregon	4	–	4	–	0	6	–	6	–	0
UCLA	3	–	5	–	0	6	–	5	–	0
California	2	–	6	–	0	4	–	7	–	0
Oregon State	0	–	7	–	1	1	–	9	–	1
+ – Conference co-champions; Rankings from AP Poll

The 1992 Washington State Cougars football team was an American football team that represented Washington State University in the Pacific-10 Conference (Pac-10) during the 1992 NCAA Division I-A football season. In their fourth season under head coach Mike Price, the Cougars were 8–3 in the regular season (5–3 in Pac-10, tied for third), won their bowl game, and outscored their opponents 337 to 281.

The team's statistical leaders included Drew Bledsoe with 3,246 passing yards, Shaumbe Wright-Fair with 1,331 rushing yards, and C. J. Davis with 1,024 receiving yards.

Home games were played on campus at Martin Stadium in Pullman.

Washington State opened with six wins, and were thirteenth in the AP poll, but then lost three of four prior to the Apple Cup. A fourteen-point home underdog to fifth-ranked Washington, the Cougars pulled off a classic blowout upset in the snow, scoring 29 unanswered points in the third quarter, and won 42–23 in the 20-year-old Bledsoe's last game at Martin Stadium. WSU won the Copper Bowl by three over unranked Utah, and climbed to fifteenth in the final rankings.

Bledsoe opted not to play his senior season (1993) and was the first overall selection of the 1993 NFL draft.

== Schedule ==
Date	Time	Opponent	Rank	Site	TV	Result	Attendance	Source
September 5	2:00 pm	Montana*		Martin Stadium; Pullman, WA		W 25–13	21,068	
September 12	3:30 pm	at Arizona		Arizona Stadium; Tucson, AZ	PSN	W 23–20	39,112	
September 26	7:00 pm	at Fresno State*		Bulldog Stadium; Fresno, CA	PSN	W 39–37	38,077	
October 3	2:00 pm	Temple*		Martin Stadium; Pullman, WA		W 51–10	21,861	
October 10	1:30 pm	at Oregon State		Parker Stadium; Corvallis, OR		W 35–10	30,459	
October 17	12:30 pm	UCLA^{†}	No. 22	Martin Stadium; Pullman, Washington	ABC	W 30–17	32,208	
October 24	12:30 pm	at No. 14 USC	No. 13	Los Angeles Memorial Coliseum; Los Angeles, CA	ABC	L 21–31	54,038	
October 31	2:00 pm	Oregon	No. 19	Martin Stadium; Pullman, WA		L 17–34	25,450	
November 7	2:00 pm	Arizona State	No. 25	Martin Stadium; Pullman, WA		W 20–18	15,441	
November 14	3:30 pm	at No. 15 Stanford	No. 21	Stanford Stadium; Stanford, CA	PSN	L 3–40	52,018	
November 21	12:30 pm	No. 5 Washington		Martin Stadium; Pullman, WA (Apple Cup)	ABC	W 42–23	37,600	
December 29	5:00 pm	vs. Utah*	No. 18	Arizona Stadium; Tucson, AZ (Copper Bowl)	ESPN	W 31–28	40,876	
*Non-conference game; ^{†}Homecoming; Rankings from AP Poll released prior to the game; All times are in Pacific time

== Rankings ==
Ranking movements Legend: ██ Increase in ranking ██ Decrease in ranking — = Not ranked т = Tied with team above or below
	Week																
Poll	Pre	1	2	3	4	5	6	7	8	9	10	11	12	13	14	15	Final
AP	—	—	—	—	—	—	—	22	13	19	25	21	—	21	18	18	15
Coaches	—	—	—	—	—	—	—	21	13	18	24	22	25 т	20	19	18	17

== Game summaries ==
=== Washington ===
Washington at Washington State

Team	1	2	3	4	Total
No. 5 Huskies	0	7	0	16	23
• No. 25 Cougars	6	0	29	7	42

- Date:
  November 21
- Location: Martin Stadium, Pullman
- Game start:
  12:30 pm PST
- Game attendance: 37,600
- Game weather: 30 °F (−1 °C), snow
- Television network: ABC

Scoring summary
Q1		WSU	Wright-Fair 3 yard run (kick failed)	WSU 6–0
Q2		WASH	Brunell 1 yard run (Hanson kick)	WASH 7–6
Q3		WSU	Bobo 44 yard pass from Bledsoe (Schexnayder pass from Bledsoe)	WSU 14–7
Q3		WSU	Schexnayder 15 yard pass from Bledsoe (Price kick)	WSU 21–7
Q3	3:57	WSU	Wright-Fair 51 yard run (Price kick)	WSU 28–7
Q3		WSU	Pimiskern recovered fumble in end zone (Price kick)	WSU 35–7
Q4		WASH	Brunell 1 yard run (??? pass from Brunell)	WSU 35–15
Q4		WSU	Wright-Fair 41 yard run (Price kick)	WSU 42–15
Q4		WASH	Turner 2 yard run (Barry pass from Brunell)	WSU 42–23

The Snow Bowl

- Bledsoe 18/28, 260 yds
- Wright-Fair 22 rush, 193 yds

== Roster ==
1992 Washington State Cougars football team roster
Players
Coaches
Offense

Pos.	#	Name	Class
OT	75	Mike Bailey	Jr
QB	11	Drew Bledsoe	Jr
WR	2	Phillip Bobo	Jr
TE	89	Brett Carolan	Jr
WR	1	C. J. Davis	Sr
G	61	Josh Dunning	Jr
OT	72	Jim Eucker	Sr
OT	74	Bob Garman	Sr
WR	85	Albert Kennedy	So
OL	64	Ron Lewis	Jr
QB	13	Mike Pattinson	Jr
OT	77	Konrad Pimiskern	Sr
WR	9	Deron Pointer	Jr
WR	6	Calvin Schexnayder	Sr
TE	84	Dustin Smith	Sr
RB	5	Derek Sparks	So
C	66	Robbie Tobeck	Sr
OT	78	Andy Tribble	Sr
TE	98	Clarence Williams	Sr
RB	32	Shaumbe Wright-Fair	Sr

Defense

Pos.	#	Name	Class
LB	57	Kevin Ashworth	Sr
CB	27	Greg Burns	So
LB	48	Lewis Bush	Sr
LB	31	Ron Childs	So
DT	90	Chad Eaton	So
LB	29	Mark Fields	So
DT	69	Brian Ford	Jr
DT	97	Chris Frank	Sr
DT	92	Ray Hall	Jr
CB	24	Torey Hunter	So
LB	19	Kurt Loertscher	Sr
LB	41	Anthony McClanahan	Jr
SS	8	Singor Mobley	So
LB		Johnny Nansen	Fr
DE	86	DeWayne Patterson	So
FS	10	John Rushing	So
DE	99	Vince Saldivar	Jr
DE	94	Don Sasa	Jr
LB	46	Eric Thompson	Sr

Special teams

Pos.	#	Name	Class
P	28	Steve Johnston	Jr
K	12	Aaron Price	Jr

Head coach

- Mike Price (4th year)

Coordinators/assistant coaches

- Ted Williams – OC
- Mike Zimmer – DC
- Bill Doba – LB

Legend

- (C) Team captain
- (S) Suspended
- (I) Ineligible
- Injured
- Redshirt

== NFL draft ==
Three Cougars were selected in the 1993 NFL draft. Drew Bledsoe was the first overall selection.

Player	Position	Round	Overall	Franchise
Drew Bledsoe	QB	1	1	New England Patriots
Lewis Bush	LB	4	99	San Diego Chargers
Clarence Williams	TE	7	169	Denver Broncos
