= 1993 UCLA Bruins football team =

American college football season

1993 UCLA Bruins football

Pac-10 co-champion

Rose Bowl, L 16–21 vs. Wisconsin
- Conference: Pacific-10 Conference

Ranking
- Coaches: No. 17
- AP: No. 18
- Record: 8–4 (6–2 Pac-10)
- Head coach: Terry Donahue (18th season)
- Offensive coordinator: Homer Smith (13th season)
- Defensive coordinator: Bob Field (12th season)
- Home stadium: Rose Bowl

1993 Pacific-10 Conference football standings
	Conf.					Overall
Team	W		L		T	W		L		T
No. 10 Arizona +	6	–	2	–	0	10	–	2	–	0
No. 18 UCLA +	6	–	2	–	0	8	–	4	–	0
USC +	6	–	2	–	0	8	–	5	–	0
Washington	5	–	3	–	0	7	–	4	–	0
No. 25 California	4	–	4	–	0	9	–	4	–	0
Arizona State	4	–	4	–	0	6	–	5	–	0
Washington State	3	–	5	–	0	5	–	6	–	0
Oregon	2	–	6	–	0	5	–	6	–	0
Oregon State	2	–	6	–	0	4	–	7	–	0
Stanford	2	–	6	–	0	4	–	7	–	0
+ – Conference co-champions; Rankings from AP Poll

The 1993 UCLA Bruins football team represented the University of California, Los Angeles (UCLA) as a member of the Pacific-10 Conference (Pac-10) during the 1993 NCAA Division I-A football season. Led by 18th-year head coach Terry Donahue, the Bruins compiled an overall record of 8–4 with a mark of 6–2 in conference play, sharing the Pac-10 title with Arizona and USC. UCLA earned a berth in the Rose Bowl, where the Bruins lost to Wisconsin. The team was ranked No. 18 in the final AP poll and No. 17 in the final Coaches Poll. UCLA played home games at the Rose Bowl in Pasadena, California.

== Schedule ==
Date	Time	Opponent	Rank	Site	TV	Result	Attendance
September 4	7:00 pm	California		Rose Bowl; Pasadena, CA (rivalry)		L 25–27	53,634
September 18	12:30 pm	No. 8 Nebraska*		Rose Bowl; Pasadena, CA	ABC	L 13–14	50,299
September 25	12:30 pm	at No. 17 Stanford		Stanford Stadium; Stanford, CA (rivalry)	ABC	W 28–25	53,700
September 30	5:00 pm	at San Diego State*		Jack Murphy Stadium; San Diego, CA	ESPN	W 52–13	44,669
October 9	7:00 pm	No. 19 BYU*	No. 25	Rose Bowl; Pasadena, CA	CBS	W 68–14	50,713
October 16	12:30 pm	No. 12 Washington	No. 22	Rose Bowl; Pasadena, CA	ABC	W 39–25	40,830
October 23	3:30 pm	at Oregon State	No. 19	Parker Stadium; Corvallis, OR	Prime	W 20–17	30,108
October 30	7:30 pm	No. 7 Arizona	No. 15	Rose Bowl; Pasadena, CA	ESPN	W 37–17	65,656
November 6	12:30 pm	at Washington State	No. 12	Martin Stadium; Pullman, WA	ABC	W 40–27	34,987
November 13	3:30 pm	Arizona State	No. 10	Rose Bowl; Pasadena, CA	Prime	L 3–9	40,346
November 20	12:30 pm	at No. 22 USC	No. 16	Los Angeles Memorial Coliseum; Los Angeles, CA (Victory Bell)	ABC	W 27–21	93,458
January 1	1:30 pm	vs. No. 9 Wisconsin*	No. 14	Rose Bowl; Pasadena, CA (Rose Bowl)	ABC	L 16–21	101,237
*Non-conference game; Rankings from AP Poll released prior to the game; All times are in Pacific time

== Game summaries ==
=== Wisconsin (Rose Bowl) ===
	1	2	3	4	Total
#9 Wisconsin	7	7	0	7	21
#14 UCLA	3	0	0	13	16

The weather was 73 degrees and hazy. UCLA receiver J. J. Stokes set Rose Bowl records for receptions (14) and receiving yards (176). Brent Moss gashed the UCLA defense for 158 rushing yards and 2 TDs.

First quarter scoring: UCLA – Bjorn Merten 27-yard field goal; Wisconsin – Brent Moss three-yard run (Rick Schnetzky kick)

Second quarter scoring: Wisconsin – Moss one-yard run (Schnetzky kick)

Third quarter scoring: No Scoring

Fourth quarter scoring: UCLA – Ricky Davis 12-yard run (Merten kick); Wisconsin – Darrell Bevell 21-yard run (Schnetzky kick); UCLA – Mike Nguyen five-yard pass from Wayne Cook (2-point conversion pass failed)

== Roster ==
1993 UCLA Bruins football team roster
Players
Coaches
Offense

Pos.	#	Name	Class
WR	14	Brent Brennan	Jr
QB	15	Wayne Cook	Jr
C	58	Mike Flanagan	So
RB	20	Skip Hicks	Fr
WR	4	Kevin Jordan	So
OT	79	Jonathan Ogden	So
G	68	Vaughn Parker	Sr
WR	18	J. J. Stokes	Jr

Defense

Pos.	#	Name	Class
LB	23	Donnie Edwards	So
CB	21	Carl Greenwood	Jr
DT	93	Travis Kirschke	Fr
LB	95	Jamir Miller	Sr

Special teams

Pos.	#	Name	Class

Head coach

- Terry Donahue

Coordinators/assistant coaches

Legend

- (C) Team captain
- (S) Suspended
- (I) Ineligible
- Injured
- Redshirt

== Statistics ==
Team stats	Wisconsin	UCLA
First downs	21	31
Net Yards Rushing	250	212
Net Yards Passing	96	288
Total Yards	346	500
PC–PA–Int.	10–20–1	28–43–1
Punts–Avg.	6–38.2	2–35.0
Fumbles–Lost	2–0	5–5
Penalties–Yards	12–89	9–95

== Awards and honors ==
- All-Americans: Marvin Goodwin (S), Bjorn Merten (PK, consensus), Jamir Miller (OLB, consensus), Craig Novitsky (OG), Vaughn Parker (OT), J. J. Stokes (WR, consensus)
- All-Conference First Team: Marvin Goodwin (SS), Bjorn Merten (PK), Jamir Miller (OLB), Craig Novitsky (OG), Vaughn Parker (OT), Darren Schager (P), J. J. Stokes (WR)
