= 1992 Oregon Ducks football team =

American college football season

1992 Oregon Ducks football

Independence Bowl, L 35–39 vs. Wake Forest
- Conference: Pacific-10 Conference
- Record: 6–6 (4–4 Pac-10)
- Head coach: Rich Brooks (16th season)
- Offensive coordinator: Mike Bellotti (4th season)
- Offensive scheme: Pro-style
- Defensive coordinator: Denny Schuler (7th season)
- Base defense: 5–2
- Captains: Eric Castle; Jeff Cummins; Vince Ferry; Jon Tattersall
- Home stadium: Autzen Stadium

1992 Pacific-10 Conference football standings
	Conf.					Overall
Team	W		L		T	W		L		T
No. 11 Washington +	6	–	2	–	0	9	–	3	–	0
No. 9 Stanford +	6	–	2	–	0	10	–	3	–	0
No. 15 Washington State	5	–	3	–	0	9	–	3	–	0
USC	5	–	3	–	0	6	–	5	–	1
Arizona	4	–	3	–	1	6	–	5	–	1
Arizona State	4	–	4	–	0	6	–	5	–	0
Oregon	4	–	4	–	0	6	–	6	–	0
UCLA	3	–	5	–	0	6	–	5	–	0
California	2	–	6	–	0	4	–	7	–	0
Oregon State	0	–	7	–	1	1	–	9	–	1
+ – Conference co-champions; Rankings from AP Poll

The 1992 Oregon Ducks football team represented the University of Oregon during the 1992 NCAA Division I-A football season. They were led by head coach Rich Brooks, who was in his 16th season as head coach of the Ducks. They played their home games at Autzen Stadium in Eugene, Oregon and participated as members of the Pacific-10 Conference.

== Schedule ==
Date	Time	Opponent	Site	TV	Result	Attendance	Source
September 5	1:00 pm	Hawaii*	Autzen Stadium; Eugene, OR		L 21–24	32,560	
September 12	12:30 pm	at No. 21 Stanford	Stanford Stadium; Stanford, CA (rivalry)	ABC	L 7–21	43,656	
September 19	12:30 pm	Texas Tech*	Autzen Stadium; Eugene, OR		W 16–13	28,361	
September 26	1:00 pm	UNLV*	Autzen Stadium; Eugene, OR		W 59–6	29,508	
October 3	1:00 pm	Arizona State	Autzen Stadium; Eugene, OR	Prime	W 30–20	30,121	
October 10	3:30 pm	at No. 20 USC	Los Angeles Memorial Coliseum; Los Angeles, CA (rivalry)	Prime	L 10–32	46,343	
October 17	1:00 pm	No. 1 Washington	Autzen Stadium; Eugene, OR (rivalry)	Prime	L 3–24	47,612	
October 31	2:00 pm	at No. 19 Washington State	Martin Stadium; Pullman, WA		W 34–17	25,450	
November 7	1:00 pm	California	Autzen Stadium; Eugene, OR		W 37–17	34,651	
November 14	1:00 pm	UCLA	Autzen Stadium; Eugene, OR		L 6–9	33,771	
November 21	1:00 pm	at Oregon State	Parker Stadium; Corvallis, OR (Civil War)	Prime	W 7–0	35,547	
December 31	9:30 am	vs. Wake Forest*	Independence Bowl; Shreveport, LA (Independence Bowl)	ESPN	L 35–39	31,337	
*Non-conference game; Rankings from AP Poll released prior to the game; All times are in Pacific time

== Games summaries ==
=== Oregon State ===
Oregon Ducks (5–6) at Oregon State Beavers (1–8–1)

Quarter	1	2	3	4	Total
Oregon	0	7	0	0	7
Oregon St	0	0	0	0	0

at Parker Stadium, Corvallis, Oregon

- Date: November 21, 1992
- Game weather: Rain
- Game attendance: 35,547
- TV: Prime
- Eugene Register-Guard. 1992 Nov 22.

Game information

Second quarter

- ORE – Willy Tate 3-yard pass from Danny O'Neil (Tommy Thompson kick), 0:35. Oregon 7–0. Drive: 6 plays, 22 yards.

Top passers

- ORE – Danny O'Neil – 8/16, 80 yards, TD
- OSU – Ian Shields – 1/3, 11 yards; Mark Olford – 1/1, 11 yards

Top rushers

- ORE – Ricky Whittle – 11 rushes, 66 yards
- OSU – Dwayne Owens – 3 rushes, 29 yards

Top receivers

- ORE – Sean Burwell – 3 receptions, 33 yards
- OSU – Kevin Strasser – 1 receptions, 11 yards; Maurice Wilson – 1 reception, 11 yards

== Roster ==
1992 Oregon Ducks football team roster
Players
Coaches
Offense

Pos.	#	Name	Class
RB		Sean Burwell
OL		David Collinsworth
OL		Tom Curran
RB		Derrick Deadwiler
OL		Mike DiFonzo
TE		Vince Ferry
OL		Steve Hardin
WR		Ronnie Harris
OL		Heath Howington
WR		Anthony Jones
RB		Dwayne Jones
WR		Cristin McLemore
RB		Dan Meade
RB		Donovan Moore
WR		Kory Murphy
QB		Doug Musgrave
QB	16	Danny O'Neil	So
RB		Juan Shedrick
OL		Justin Starck
TE		Willy Tate
OL		Jon Tattersall
RB		Ricky Whittle

Defense

Pos.	#	Name	Class
LB		Jeremy Asher
DL		Romeo Bandison
DB		Eric Castle
DB	7	Chad Cota	So
DE		Jeff Cummins
LB		Terrell Edwards
LB		Joe Farwell
LB		Ernest Jones
LB		Dave Massey
DB		Alex Molden
DB		Herman O'Berry
DB		Paul Rodriguez
DL		Gary Williams

Special teams

Pos.	#	Name	Class
K, P		Tommy Thompson

Head coach

- Rich Brooks

Coordinators/assistant coaches

Legend

- (C) Team captain
- (S) Suspended
- (I) Ineligible
- Injured
- Redshirt
