= 1992 USC Trojans football team =

American college football season

1992 USC Trojans football

Freedom Bowl, L 7–24 vs. Fresno State
- Conference: Pacific-10 Conference
- Record: 6–5–1 (5–3 Pac-10)
- Head coach: Larry Smith (6th season)
- Offensive coordinator: Ray Dorr (1st season)
- Captain: Stephon Pace
- Home stadium: Los Angeles Memorial Coliseum

1992 Pacific-10 Conference football standings
	Conf.					Overall
Team	W		L		T	W		L		T
No. 11 Washington +	6	–	2	–	0	9	–	3	–	0
No. 9 Stanford +	6	–	2	–	0	10	–	3	–	0
No. 15 Washington State	5	–	3	–	0	9	–	3	–	0
USC	5	–	3	–	0	6	–	5	–	1
Arizona	4	–	3	–	1	6	–	5	–	1
Arizona State	4	–	4	–	0	6	–	5	–	0
Oregon	4	–	4	–	0	6	–	6	–	0
UCLA	3	–	5	–	0	6	–	5	–	0
California	2	–	6	–	0	4	–	7	–	0
Oregon State	0	–	7	–	1	1	–	9	–	1
+ – Conference co-champions; Rankings from AP Poll

The 1992 USC Trojans football team represented the University of Southern California (USC) in the 1992 NCAA Division I-A football season. In their sixth and final year under head coach Larry Smith, the Trojans compiled a 6–5–1 record (5–3 against conference opponents), finished in a tie for third place in the Pacific-10 Conference (Pac-10), and outscored their opponents by a combined total of 264 to 249.

USC's hundredth football season was also Larry Smith's last. Though they placed third in the Pac-10 and secured a bowl berth, they lost their last three games including their rivalry games against Notre Dame and UCLA. Smith was replaced at the end of the season by John Robinson, who returned to USC for a rare second tenure as head coach.

Quarterback Rob Johnson led the team in passing, completing 163 of 285 passes for 2,118 yards with 12 touchdowns and 14 interceptions. Estrus Crayton led the team in rushing with 183 carries for 700 yards and five touchdowns. Curtis Conway led the team in receiving with 49 catches for 764 yards and five touchdowns; Johnnie Morton also had 49 catches for 756 yards and six touchdowns.

== Schedule ==
Date	Time	Opponent	Rank	Site	TV	Result	Attendance	Source
September 5	12:30 p.m.	at San Diego State*		Jack Murphy Stadium; San Diego, CA	ABC	T 31–31	52,168	
September 19	12:30 p.m.	at No. 13 Oklahoma*		Oklahoma Memorial Stadium; Norman, OK	ABC	W 20–10	70,215	
October 3	12:30 p.m.	at No. 1 Washington	No. 20	Husky Stadium; Seattle, WA	ABC	L 10–17	73,275	
October 10	3:30 p.m.	Oregon	No. 20	Los Angeles Memorial Coliseum; Los Angeles, CA	Prime	W 32–10	46,343	
October 17	3:30 p.m.	California	No. 18	Los Angeles Memorial Coliseum; Los Angeles, CA	Prime	W 27–24	54,476	
October 24	12:30 p.m.	No. 13 Washington State^{†}	No. 15	Los Angeles Memorial Coliseum; Los Angeles, CA	ABC	W 31–21	54,038	
October 31	3:30 p.m.	at Arizona State	No. 13	Sun Devil Stadium; Tempe, AZ	Prime	W 23–13	51,096	
November 7	3:30 p.m.	at No. 21 Stanford	No. 11	Stanford Stadium; Stanford, CA (rivalry)	Prime	L 9–23	72,571	
November 14	12:30 p.m.	No. 9 Arizona	No. 18	Los Angeles Memorial Coliseum; Los Angeles, CA	ABC	W 14–7	53,849	
November 21	4:30 p.m.	at UCLA	No. 15	Rose Bowl; Pasadena, CA (Victory Bell)	ESPN	L 37–38	80,568	
November 28	5:00 p.m.	No. 5 Notre Dame*	No. 19	Los Angeles Memorial Coliseum; Los Angeles, CA (rivalry)	ABC	L 23–31	90,063	
December 29	6:00 p.m.	vs. Fresno State*	No. 23	Anaheim Stadium; Anaheim, CA (Freedom Bowl)	Raycom	L 7–24	50,745	
*Non-conference game; ^{†}Homecoming; Rankings from AP Poll released prior to the game; Source:

== Game summaries ==
=== Oklahoma ===
USC at Oklahoma

Team	1	2	3	4	Total
• USC	0	0	0	20	20
Oklahoma	0	3	7	0	10

- Date: Saturday, September 19
- Location: Memorial Stadium
- TV announcers (ABC): Roger Twibell & Lynn Swann
- Source: Gainesville Sun

Scoring summary
2	OKLA	Blanton 42-yard field goal	OKLA 3-0
3	OKLA	Warren 25-yard pass from Gundy (Blanton kick)	OKLA 10-0
4	USC	Conway 51-yard pass from Johnson (Ford kick)	OKLA 10-7
4	USC	Pace 19-yard fumble return (Ford kick)	USC 14-10
4	USC	Perry 2-yard run (kick failed)	USC 20-10

== Roster ==
1992 USC Trojans football team roster
Players
Coaches
Offense

Pos.	#	Name	Class
TE	82	Bradford Banta	Jr
OT	71	Tony Boselli	So
WR	3	Curtis Conway	Sr
		Estrus Crayton
OT	76	Norberto Garrido	Fr
WR	88	Ed Hervey	So
QB	11	Rob Johnson	So
TE	81	Johnny McWilliams	Fr
WR	80	Johnnie Morton	Jr
QB	7	Kyle Wachholtz	Fr

Defense

Pos.	#	Name	Class
LB	35	Jeff Kopp	So
DE	55	Willie McGinest	Jr
CB	18	Jason Sehorn	Jr
LB	5	Brian Williams	So

Special teams

Pos.	#	Name	Class
K	14	Cole Ford	So

Head coach

- Larry Smith

Coordinators/assistant coaches

- Tom Roggeman

Legend

- (C) Team captain
- (S) Suspended
- (I) Ineligible
- Injured
- Redshirt
