= 1993 USC Trojans football team =

American college football season

1993 USC Trojans football

Pac-10 co-champion Freedom Bowl champion

Freedom Bowl, W 28–21 vs Utah
- Conference: Pacific-10 Conference

Ranking
- Coaches: No. 25
- Record: 8–5 (6–2 Pac-10)
- Head coach: John Robinson (8th season)
- Offensive coordinator: Mike Riley (1st season)
- Captains: Craig Gibson; Willie McGinest; Deon Strother
- Home stadium: Los Angeles Memorial Coliseum

1993 Pacific-10 Conference football standings
	Conf.					Overall
Team	W		L		T	W		L		T
No. 10 Arizona +	6	–	2	–	0	10	–	2	–	0
No. 18 UCLA +	6	–	2	–	0	8	–	4	–	0
USC +	6	–	2	–	0	8	–	5	–	0
Washington	5	–	3	–	0	7	–	4	–	0
No. 25 California	4	–	4	–	0	9	–	4	–	0
Arizona State	4	–	4	–	0	6	–	5	–	0
Washington State	3	–	5	–	0	5	–	6	–	0
Oregon	2	–	6	–	0	5	–	6	–	0
Oregon State	2	–	6	–	0	4	–	7	–	0
Stanford	2	–	6	–	0	4	–	7	–	0
+ – Conference co-champions; Rankings from AP Poll

The 1993 USC Trojans football team represented the University of Southern California (USC) in the 1993 NCAA Division I-A football season. In their eighth non-consecutive year under head coach John Robinson (Robinson was also USC's coach from 1976 to 1982), the Trojans compiled an 8–5 record (6–2 against conference opponents), won the Pacific-10 Conference (Pac-10) championship, and outscored their opponents by a combined total of 348 to 252.

Quarterback Rob Johnson led the team in passing, completing 308 of 449 passes for 3,630 yards with 29 touchdowns and six interceptions. Shawn Walters led the team in rushing with 156 carries for 711 yards and seven touchdowns. Johnnie Morton led the team in receiving with 88 catches for 1,520 yards and 14 touchdowns.

== Schedule ==
Date	Time	Opponent	Rank	Site	TV	Result	Attendance	Source
August 29	6:00 p.m.	vs. No. 20 North Carolina*	No. 19	Anaheim Stadium; Anaheim, CA (Pigskin Classic)	NBC	L 9–31	49,309	
September 4	3:30 p.m.	Houston*		Los Angeles Memorial Coliseum; Los Angeles, CA	Prime	W 49–7	49,438	
September 11	12:30 p.m.	at No. 15 Penn State*		Beaver Stadium; University Park, PA	ABC	L 20–21	95,992	
September 25	7:00 p.m.	Washington State		Los Angeles Memorial Coliseum; Los Angeles, CA	Prime	W 34–3	48,471	
October 2	4:00 p.m.	at No. 12 Arizona		Arizona Stadium; Tucson, AZ	ABC	L 7–38	56,075	
October 9	3:30 p.m.	at Oregon		Autzen Stadium; Eugene, OR	Prime	W 24–13	40,935	
October 16	3:30 p.m.	Oregon State^{†}		Los Angeles Memorial Coliseum; Los Angeles, CA	Prime	W 34–9	44,363	
October 23	11:30 a.m.	at No. 2 Notre Dame*		Notre Dame Stadium; Notre Dame, IN (rivalry)	NBC	L 13–31	59,075	
October 30	12:30 p.m.	at California		California Memorial Stadium; Berkeley, CA	ABC	W 42–14	56,000	
November 6	3:30 p.m.	Stanford		Los Angeles Memorial Coliseum; Los Angeles, CA (rivalry)	Prime	W 45–20	59,376	
November 13	12:30 p.m.	at No. 25 Washington		Husky Stadium; Seattle, WA	ABC	W 22–17	72,202	
November 20	12:30 p.m.	No. 16 UCLA	No. 22	Los Angeles Memorial Coliseum; Los Angeles, CA (Victory Bell)	ABC	L 21–27	93,458	
December 30	6:00 p.m.	vs. Utah*		Anaheim Stadium; Anaheim, CA (Freedom Bowl)	Raycom	W 28–21	37,203	
*Non-conference game; ^{†}Homecoming; Rankings from AP Poll released prior to the game; All times are in Pacific time

== Game summaries ==
=== Washington State ===
Statistics

- Receiving: Johnnie Morton 8 receptions, 229 yards, TD

== Roster ==
1993 USC Trojans football team roster
Players
Coaches
Offense

Pos.	#	Name	Class
TE	84	John Allred	Fr
TE	82	Bradford Banta	Sr
OT	71	Tony Boselli	Jr
OT	76	Norberto Garrido	So
C	66	Clay Hattabaugh	Jr
WR	88	Ed Hervey	Jr
QB	11	Rob Johnson	Jr
TE	81	Johnny McWilliams	So
WR	80	Johnnie Morton	Sr
QB	7	Kyle Wachholtz	So

Defense

Pos.	#	Name	Class
S	9	Sammy Knight	Fr
LB	35	Jeff Kopp	Jr
DE	55	Willie McGinest	Sr
DE	99	John Michels	So
CB	18	Jason Sehorn	Sr
LB	5	Brian Williams	Jr
LB	58	Heath Anderson	Fr

Special teams

Pos.	#	Name	Class
K	14	Cole Ford	Jr

Head coach

- John Robinson

Coordinators/assistant coaches

- Keith Burns (defensive backs)

Legend

- (C) Team captain
- (S) Suspended
- (I) Ineligible
- Injured
- Redshirt

== 1994 NFL draft ==
The following players were claimed in the 1994 NFL draft.

Player	Position	Round	Pick	NFL club
Willie McGinest	Linebacker	1	4	New England Patriots
Johnnie Morton	Wide receiver	1	21	Detroit Lions
Jason Sehorn	Defensive back	2	59	New York Giants
Bradford Banta	Tight end	4	106	Indianapolis Colts
