= 1992 Arizona Wildcats football team =

American college football season

1992 Arizona Wildcats football

John Hancock Bowl, L 15–20 vs. Baylor
- Conference: Pacific-10 Conference
- Record: 6–5–1 (4–3–1 Pac-10)
- Head coach: Dick Tomey (6th season)
- Offensive coordinator: Duane Akina (1st season)
- Offensive scheme: Multiple
- Defensive coordinator: Larry Mac Duff (6th season)
- Base defense: Double Eagle Flex
- Home stadium: Arizona Stadium

1992 Pacific-10 Conference football standings
	Conf.					Overall
Team	W		L		T	W		L		T
No. 11 Washington +	6	–	2	–	0	9	–	3	–	0
No. 9 Stanford +	6	–	2	–	0	10	–	3	–	0
No. 15 Washington State	5	–	3	–	0	9	–	3	–	0
USC	5	–	3	–	0	6	–	5	–	1
Arizona	4	–	3	–	1	6	–	5	–	1
Arizona State	4	–	4	–	0	6	–	5	–	0
Oregon	4	–	4	–	0	6	–	6	–	0
UCLA	3	–	5	–	0	6	–	5	–	0
California	2	–	6	–	0	4	–	7	–	0
Oregon State	0	–	7	–	1	1	–	9	–	1
+ – Conference co-champions; Rankings from AP Poll

The 1992 Arizona Wildcats football team represented the University of Arizona in the Pacific-10 Conference (Pac-10) during the 1992 NCAA Division I-A football season. In their sixth season under head coach Dick Tomey, the Wildcats compiled a 6–5–1 record (4–3–1 against Pac-10 opponents), finished in fifth place in the Pac-10, lost to Baylor in the 1992 John Hancock Bowl, and outscored their opponents, 232 to 118. The defense allowed an average of 9.8 points per game, second best in Division I-A. The team played its home games in Arizona Stadium in Tucson, Arizona.

The team's statistical leaders included George Malauulu with 1,210 passing yards, Ontiwaun Carter with 739 rushing yards, and Troy Dickey with 395 receiving yards. Linebacker Sean Harris led the team with 71 tackles.

Although despite having an average record, Arizona’s season featured a major upset win over top-ranked Washington in early November with a dominant defense, and was known as the program’s biggest victory and the defense’s performance began an era known to fans as the “Desert Swarm”.

== Schedule ==
Date	Time	Opponent	Rank	Site	TV	Result	Attendance	Source
September 5	7:00 p.m.	Utah State*		Arizona Stadium; Tucson, AZ	KTTU	W 49–3	37,239	
September 12	7:00 p.m.	Washington State		Arizona Stadium; Tucson, AZ	Prime	L 20–23	39,112	
September 19	7:00 p.m.	at Oregon State		Parker Stadium; Corvallis, OR		T 14–14	25,187	
September 26	9:30 a.m.	at No. 1 Miami (FL)*		Miami Orange Bowl; Miami, FL	PPV	L 7–8	47,049	
October 3	7:00 p.m.	No. 11 UCLA		Arizona Stadium; Tucson, AZ	Prime	W 23–3	50,708	
October 17	12:30 p.m.	at No. 8 Stanford		Stanford Stadium; Palo Alto, CA	ABC	W 21–6	47,217	
October 24	1:00 p.m.	at California	No. 21	California Memorial Stadium; Berkeley, CA	Prime	W 24–17	46,000	
October 31	7:00 p.m.	New Mexico State*	No. 17	Arizona Stadium; Tucson, AZ	KTTU	W 30–0	38,463	
November 7	1:30 p.m.	No. 1 Washington^{†}	No. 12	Arizona Stadium; Tucson, AZ	ABC	W 16–3	58,510	
November 14	2:30 p.m.	at No. 18 USC	No. 9	Los Angeles Memorial Coliseum; Los Angeles, CA	Prime	L 7–14	53,849	
November 21	7:30 p.m.	Arizona State	No. 16	Arizona Stadium; Tucson, AZ (rivalry)	Prime	L 6–7	58,095	
December 31	12:30 p.m.	vs. Baylor*	No. 22	Sun Bowl; El Paso, TX (John Hancock Bowl)	CBS	L 15–20	41,622	
*Non-conference game; ^{†}Homecoming; Rankings from AP Poll released prior to the game; All times are in Mountain time

== Game summaries ==
=== Oregon State ===
Arizona went to Oregon State to face the Beavers. The defenses of both teams would slow down each other’s offenses on its way to a tie, which evened up the Wildcats’ record at 1–1–1.

=== Miami (FL) ===
The Wildcats went east to south Florida to take on top-ranked Miami. Arizona’s offense played poorly and their defense shut down the Hurricanes’ powerful offense to stay in the game. In the final minute of the fourth quarter, the Wildcats had a chance to potentially win with a field goal, but narrowly missed and Miami escaped a major upset bid by the Wildcats.

=== UCLA ===
After losing a heartbreaker at Miami, Arizona returned home to host 11th-ranked UCLA. The Wildcats’ defense slowed the Bruins and the offense improved enough to get the win.

=== Stanford ===
The Wildcats went back on the road and visited Stanford, who was ranked eighth. Again, Arizona’s defense took care of business by shutting down Stanford for another win.

=== New Mexico State ===
Arizona faced New Mexico State for a Halloween matchup. This was the first game between the two teams since 1954. The Wildcats would show the Aggies why their defense was one of the best in the nation by holding them scoreless in a shutout victory.

=== Washington ===
On homecoming day, Arizona took on Washington. It was the second top-ranked opponent that the Wildcats faced in the season. Arizona counted on their dominant defense and slowed down the Huskies’ high-powered offense all game long. Late in the fourth quarter, Arizona scored the game’s only touchdown to break it open and pulled off the huge upset which stunned the college football world. Wildcat fans rushed the field as time expired and tore down the goal posts and set off wild celebrations across Tucson that lasted into the evening. It was also Arizona’s fifth consecutive win and ended the Huskies’ hopes for a second consecutive national championship. Washington, however, went on to share the Pac-10 title with Stanford and went to the Rose Bowl due to their head-to-head win over the Cardinal.

It was the Wildcats’ first win over a top-ranked team since 1981, when they stunned USC on the road. The win also erased memories of Arizona’s loss to Miami earlier in the season. Days after the game, Arizona moved up the rankings into the top ten.

=== USC ===
Fresh off after their big upset over Washington, the Wildcats hoped to continue building their momentum and traveled to USC at the Coliseum and was ranked in the top ten (USC was 18th). Arizona’s defense was again solid, holding the Trojans in check for most of the game. However, the Wildcat offense continued to be mediocre, which led to a low-scoring matchup and would keep USC within distance with the Wildcats ahead 7–6. Midway through the fourth quarter, the Trojans drove into Arizona territory and scored a touchdown and a two-point conversion to take a 14–7 lead. The Wildcats tried to respond, but came up empty and USC held on for the victory and snapped Arizona’s winning streak at five.

=== Arizona State ===
In the regular season finale, Arizona hosted Arizona State in the rivalry game. For most of the game, ASU had no answer against the Wildcats’ menacing defense. Arizona mustered only a pair of field goals and was pitching a shutout in the first three quarters and was seemingly in position to earn the rivalry’s first shutout since 1974.

However, early in the fourth quarter. Arizona State ran a running play and ran past the Wildcats’ defense for a long touchdown for a 7–6 lead. Arizona threatened late, but missed a field goal that would have regained the lead, and Arizona State held on to upset the Wildcats. It was the Wildcats’ first home loss to ASU since 1980 and ASU fans referred to the winning touchdown as “The Run”.

Despite the loss, the Wildcats were still assured of a bowl appearance with a 6–4–1 record.

=== Baylor (John Hancock Bowl) ===
Arizona was invited to play in the John Hancock Bowl against Baylor in El Paso. The Wildcats held a 13–7 lead at halftime, led by their great defense, which they been all season. In the second half, the Bears took advantage and took the lead. Arizona’s offense would then do nothing and only scored a safety, but were still in the game. Baylor would stop Arizona on their final drive to win it and the Wildcats ended the season with three straight losses.

== Awards and honors ==
- Dick Tomey, Pac-10 coach of the year
- Rob Waldrop, DT, Pac-10 Morris Trophy winner (defense), First-team All-Pac-10, Consensus and AP All-American
- Sean Harris, LB, First-team All-Pac-10

== Season notes ==
- The dominance by Arizona’s defense throughout the season was known nicknamed the “Desert Swarm”. The Arizona Daily Star, the primary Tucson newspaper, began using the nickname when posting articles on the team’s performance, with the name coming from the fact that Arizona is located in a desert climate and the Wildcats’ defense shutting down opponents’ offenses by “swarming” them around by blitzing them in a dominant fashion. Arizona finished the season ranked first in scoring defense and second behind Alabama in both total and rushing defense and held opponents to almost negative rushing yards.
- Tomey entered the season on the hot seat, meaning that he could get fired if Arizona didn’t win more games. However, the season was turned around by the Desert Swarm and Tomey was named the Pac-10 coach of the year for the team’s efforts.
- The tie at Oregon State was the final tie ever for Arizona, as they have any more of them before the ties were eliminated for overtime periods that began in 1996. It was also Tomey’s fourth tie as Wildcat coach, as his first three occurred in his first season in 1987.
- The Wildcats debuted blue pants for road games this season that began with the Oregon State game. The team used the uniforms as a road opposite of their home uniforms (blue jerseys and white pants). Arizona wore the blue pants in four of the five road games, and only wore white pants against California due to the Golden Bears wearing blue uniforms at home. The blue pants would often be worn frequently during road games for the remainder of the Desert Swarm era.
- The games against Oregon State and Miami were some of the few Arizona road games in the 1990s that were not nationally televised. The former was only aired locally in Oregon and the latter was broadcast regionally in Florida. Wildcat fans had to watch the Miami by ordering it on pay-per-view due to Miami being top-ranked.
- Arizona’s season featured a tough schedule, but the “Desert Swarm” defense kept them in games and the Wildcats upset ranked teams as a result.
- The Wildcats shut out New Mexico State for the second consecutive time, with the previous meeting in 1954 also being an Arizona shutout victory.
- The win over Washington remains the Wildcats’ most recent victory over a top-ranked team. Many Arizona officials believed that it would be too difficult to accomplish the feat because of the ranking and making it unlikely that the Wildcats would ever defeat another top-ranked opponent again in the near future. Fans have often rated the win as the biggest in Arizona football history, surpassing the Wildcats’ 1981 victory over USC (which was Arizona’s other win over a number one-ranked team).
- This would be the last time that Tomey defeated Washington at home, although he beat the Huskies one final time in 1998. The Wildcats would not beat Washington in Tucson again until 2003.
- In addition to defeating Washington, had Arizona won at Miami earlier in the year, they would have accomplished a rare feat by beating two top-ranked teams in the same season.
- The loss to USC was the last time that Tomey faced predecessor Larry Smith. When the Wildcats played the Trojans in 1987, the game was known as the “Smith Bowl”, due to Smith coaching at both schools. Smith defeated Tomey in four of the six meetings against each other and was fired at the end of the season due to a late collapse, ending the “Smith Bowl” between the two teams.
- The game against Arizona State is the last time in the rivalry that both teams scored fewer than ten points.
- This was the last season where Arizona Stadium’s scoreboard had the older “A” on top of it. A new scoreboard was built prior to the start of the next season.
- The John Hancock Bowl (now Sun Bowl) was the first and only meeting between Arizona and Baylor. It was also the last time to date that the Wildcats played a football game on CBS, unless they play in a future Sun Bowl.
- Fans have often blamed the Wildcats’ three-game losing streak at the end of the season on poor offensive playing and not scoring enough points. They also believed that the team had a “hangover effect” as a result of their upset victory over Washington, which may have led to them losing both their rivalry game and bowl. Had they defeated both USC and Arizona State, the Wildcats would have likely gotten invited to the Rose Bowl.

== After the season ==
Arizona and the “Desert Swarm” would begin a run of dominance and set the stage for a 1993 season that saw them win ten games. It also would lead to the Wildcats being Rose Bowl contenders for the early-to-mid part of the decade.
