= 1993 Arizona Wildcats football team =

American college football season

1993 Arizona Wildcats football

Pac-10 co-champion Fiesta Bowl champion

Fiesta Bowl, W 29–0 vs. Miami (FL)
- Conference: Pacific-10 Conference

Ranking
- Coaches: No. 9
- AP: No. 10
- Record: 10–2 (6-2 Pac-10)
- Head coach: Dick Tomey (7th season)
- Offensive coordinator: Duane Akina (2nd season)
- Offensive scheme: Multiple
- Defensive coordinator: Larry Mac Duff (7th season)
- Base defense: Double Eagle Flex
- Home stadium: Arizona Stadium

1993 Pacific-10 Conference football standings
	Conf.					Overall
Team	W		L		T	W		L		T
No. 10 Arizona +	6	–	2	–	0	10	–	2	–	0
No. 18 UCLA +	6	–	2	–	0	8	–	4	–	0
USC +	6	–	2	–	0	8	–	5	–	0
Washington	5	–	3	–	0	7	–	4	–	0
No. 25 California	4	–	4	–	0	9	–	4	–	0
Arizona State	4	–	4	–	0	6	–	5	–	0
Washington State	3	–	5	–	0	5	–	6	–	0
Oregon	2	–	6	–	0	5	–	6	–	0
Oregon State	2	–	6	–	0	4	–	7	–	0
Stanford	2	–	6	–	0	4	–	7	–	0
+ – Conference co-champions; Rankings from AP Poll

The 1993 Arizona Wildcats football team represented the University of Arizona as a member of the Pacific-10 Conference (Pac-10) during the 1993 NCAA Division I-A football season. The offense scored 294 points while the defense allowed 161 points. Led by head coach Dick Tomey in his seventh season at Arizona, the Wildcats compiled a 10–2 record (6–2 against Pac-10 opponents), tied for first with UCLA and USC for the Pac-10 title, and defeated Miami in the Fiesta Bowl. It was the first time since 1973 that Arizona won at least a share of a conference championship and the first as a Pac-10 member.

The Wildcats would defeat USC but lose to UCLA, which led to the three-way tie for the Pac-10 title. A loss late in the season to California ended their potential chances of a Rose Bowl berth, and UCLA was invited instead due to their head-to-head victory over the Wildcats.

This season was also the first in which the Wildcats won at least ten games, and their defense, nicknamed the “Desert Swarm” was at its best, and led the nation in rushing defense and was ranked second behind Ole Miss in total defense, and was also ranked ninth in scoring defense.

== Schedule ==
Date	Time	Opponent	Rank	Site	TV	Result	Attendance
September 4	7:00 p.m.	UTEP*	No. 13	Arizona Stadium; Tucson, AZ	KTTU	W 24–6	44,410
September 11	7:00 p.m.	Pacific (CA)*	No. 13	Arizona Stadium; Tucson, AZ	KMSB	W 16–13	42,292
September 18	11:00 a.m.	at Illinois*	No. 15	Memorial Stadium; Champaign, IL	Prime	W 16–14	51,110
September 25	1:00 p.m.	at Oregon State	No. 15	Parker Stadium; Corvallis, OR	Prime	W 33–0	27,215
October 2	4:00 p.m.	USC	No. 12	Arizona Stadium; Tucson, AZ	ABC	W 38–7	56,075
October 16	7:00 p.m.	Stanford	No. 11	Arizona Stadium; Tucson, AZ	Prime	W 27–24	57,793
October 23	12:30 p.m.	No. 25 Washington State	No. 7	Arizona Stadium; Tucson, AZ	ABC	W 9–6	46,675
October 30	7:30 p.m.	at No. 15 UCLA	No. 7	Rose Bowl; Pasadena, CA	ESPN	L 17–37	66,656
November 6	4:00 p.m.	Oregon^{†}	No. 14	Arizona Stadium; Tucson, AZ	Prime	W 31–10	57,309
November 13	1:30 p.m.	at California	No. 13	California Memorial Stadium; Berkeley, CA	ABC	L 20–24	35,000
November 26	4:00 p.m.	at Arizona State	No. 19	Sun Devil Stadium; Tempe, AZ (rivalry)	ABC	W 34–20	73,115
January 1, 1994	11:00 a.m.	vs. No. 10 Miami (FL)*	No. 16	Sun Devil Stadium; Tempe, AZ (Fiesta Bowl)	NBC	W 29–0	72,260
*Non-conference game; ^{†}Homecoming; Rankings from AP Poll released prior to the game; All times are in Mountain time

== Before the season ==
Arizona ended the 1992 season with a 6–5–1 record and lost to Baylor in the John Hancock Bowl, which led the Wildcats to end the year on a losing streak. They also had a dominant performance by their defense throughout the season, and was known as the “Desert Swarm”. As most of the “Desert Swarm” was returning for the 1993 season, along with a rebuilding offense, many believed that the team would contend for the Pac-10 championship as well as a chance for a possible Rose Bowl berth. Experts picked the Wildcats to finish near the top of the conference standings. Arizona earned a preseason ranking before the season started (they were ranked 13th).

== Game summaries ==
=== Illinois ===
The Wildcats took a trip to Illinois to take on the Fighting Illini. The Desert Swarm would harass the Illini's offense all day, and scored a pair of defensive touchdowns. In the end, Arizona barely held on for the win.

=== Stanford ===
After trouncing USC in their last game, Arizona played host to Stanford. The Cardinal seemed to figure out the Desert Swarm and led 17–0 early before the Wildcats' offense found a rhythm by scoring 24 unanswered points to take the lead. In the fourth quarter, Stanford tied the game with a touchdown and later threatened for the lead, but the Swarm forced a turnover and the Wildcats responded on their final drive, and kicked a field goal on the final play to win it, surviving an upset scare by the Cardinal, and remain unbeaten.

=== Washington State ===
The Wildcats hosted Washington State in yet another home showdown. Arizona came into the game ranked seventh and the Cougars hoped to spoil the Wildcats’ perfect season. The game, however, would be dominated by both teams' defenses, with the Desert Swarm performing better than they did against Stanford. The teams traded field goals and Arizona held a slim 9–6 lead in the final seconds. The Cougars would miss a field goal as time expired that would have forced the game to end in a tie, and the Wildcats survived another scare and preserved their undefeated record.

=== UCLA ===
Arizona, still perfect, went to the Rose Bowl to face UCLA and was ranked seventh. In the game, however, Arizona had its quarterback injured early and the Bruins started on a roll. The Wildcats could not recover and UCLA cruised to a victory and gave the Wildcats their first loss to end their perfect record.

=== Oregon ===
After seeing UCLA end their unbeaten hopes, Arizona returned home for a homecoming matchup with Oregon. The Wildcats would improve on all phases, and used mostly a rushing attack. The Desert Swarm defense returned to dominance and shut down the Ducks and the Wildcats got back in the win column. It turned out to be the final home game of the season for Arizona.

With the win, Arizona completed a perfect season at home, winning all six of its games.

=== California ===
The Wildcats went back on the road to visit California. Arizona would come out hot and led 20–0 at the half, and was poised to take control of the Pac-10 and edging closer to a possible chance at the Rose Bowl. In the second half, the Golden Bears slowly began coming back and the Wildcats, believing that the game was over due to their halftime lead, began to play conservative in the fourth quarter, trying to drain much of the clock. Later in the quarter, the Wildcats threw an interception and Cal returned for a touchdown to take a 24–20 lead with over three minutes remaining. On Arizona's final drive, they went into Cal territory, but the Golden Bears' defense came up big to complete the comeback for a huge upset and Tomey and the Wildcats went to their locker room stunned at what happened.

The loss dropped the Wildcats into third place in the Pac-10 standings behind UCLA and USC and cost them of any chance at the Rose Bowl, as the winner of the UCLA-USC game the following week would earn the bowl trip, which was eventually won by UCLA.

=== Arizona State ===
Arizona traveled to Tempe for their rivalry game against Arizona State after recovering from their devastating loss at California which ended their Rose Bowl hopes. The Wildcats started slow but took control in the second half and the Desert Swarm dominated the Sun Devils, as Arizona pulled away to end a two-game losing streak in the rivalry and clinched a share of the Pac-10 title.

The win put the Wildcats in a position to be selected to the Fiesta Bowl, in which they accepted and would play Miami who also accepted the bowl bid.

=== Miami (FL)—Fiesta Bowl ===
In the Fiesta Bowl, played on New Year's Day 1994, the Wildcats and Hurricanes faced off in a big test. It was Arizona's first Fiesta Bowl since 1979. The Desert Swarm would show why they were the nation's best by shutting down Miami's explosive offense in front of a pro-Arizona crowd. The Wildcats' played well and would score a long rushing touchdown before halftime that gave them a 16–0 lead. The Desert Swarm would continue to dominate the Hurricanes in the second half and Arizona added more scores to break the game open and capture the victory with the Swarm pitching a shutout. It was the first shutout in the Fiesta Bowl's history.

== Roster ==
1993 Arizona Wildcats football team roster
Players
Coaches
Offense

Pos.	#	Name	Class
C	75	Hicham El-Mashtoub	Jr
QB	16	Dan White	So
RB	4	Chuck Levy	Sr

Defense

Pos.	#	Name	Class
LB	48	Brian Boyer	Sr
FS	3	Tony Bouie	Jr
DE	68	Tedy Bruschi	So
LB	35	Chester Burnett	Fr
LB	49	Sean Harris	Jr
DT	71	Chuck Osborne	So
DT	56	Joe Salave'a	Fr
SS	18	Brandon Sanders	So
CB	22	Mike Scurlock	Jr
DT	92	Rob Waldrop	Sr

Special teams

Pos.	#	Name	Class
K	28	Steve McLaughlin	Jr

Head coach

- Dick Tomey

Coordinators/assistant coaches

Legend

- (C) Team captain
- (S) Suspended
- (I) Ineligible
- Injured
- Redshirt

== Awards and honors ==
- Rob Waldrop, DT, Pac-10 defensive player of the year, First-team All-Pac-10, Chuck Bednarik, Bronko Nagurski, Outland Trophy Award winner, Consensus and AP All-American
- Tedy Bruschi, DE, First-team all-Pac-10
- Sean Harris, LB, First-team All-Pac-10

== Season notes ==
- This season was the first time in program history that Arizona won at least ten games in a single season, breaking a then-record of nine. Since then, they would have three more ten-win seasons, in 1998, 2014 and 2023.
- Prior to the start of the season, Arizona Stadium unveiled a new scoreboard on the north side. The scoreboard, which replaced the old one with a red “A” on top of it, was taller and featured an electronic screen and local sponsors on the boards, as well as a large “Arizona Stadium” wordmark at the top. This would last until the end of the 1998 season.
- The game against Pacific (in which the Wildcats won) was the last Arizona football game that was aired locally on Tucson television affiliate KMSB. Sister station KTTU (which was an independent affiliate at the time and would later become a UPN station and now currently affiliated with MyNetworkTV) shared selected local TV rights with KMSB since 1990, would take over airings of some Wildcat football and basketball games in 1994 and would stop broadcasting Arizona sports in 2000. It would not be until 2012, when KMSB (the Tucson Fox affiliate) would again air another Arizona game when the Wildcats appeared on the nationally televised Fox College Football events.
- The Desert Swarm reached the peak of their era in this season, by being the best in the nation in terms of rushing defense statistics, and holding most opponents to negative yards rushing. The leaders of the Swarm, Rob Waldrop and Tedy Bruschi, would be known as the greatest defensive players in Wildcat history, with the former capturing the Pac-12 defensive player of the year award and several national awards, and the latter being voted the best Wildcat football player on the defensive side.
- This was one of the many seasons that the Wildcats had near-misses at a Rose Bowl appearance. The Wildcats had also lost out on the bowl bid in 1985, 1992, 1994, 1998, 2010, and 2014 by losing crucial games late in each season, and leading to fans placing a “curse” on the program.
- The win over USC remains Arizona's highest margin of victory against the Trojans as of 2023 (31 points).
- Arizona played two consecutive games that were decided by last-second field goal tries that led to Wildcat victories, with Arizona making theirs against Stanford and Washington State missing their own.
- The loss to UCLA was mostly blamed on a late kickoff, an injury to the starting quarterback, poor defense, pressure caused by crowd noise, and great coaching by the Bruins was the main cause of the Wildcats not making the Rose Bowl.
- Arizona went undefeated at home, making it the first time since 1964 that they had an unbeaten home record (including ties).
- The Wildcats ended the season with two consecutive games played in Tempe (against Arizona State and the Fiesta Bowl) for the first time since 1979, when they last went to the Fiesta Bowl.
- This was the first and so far, only time in team history that Arizona played a bowl game on New Year's Day.
- The Fiesta Bowl win remains the first and only victory for the Wildcats in the bowl game. They would return to the bowl in 2014 and ultimately lost it. Also, to date, the bowl game was the last time that a Wildcat football game aired on NBC.
- After this season, there would not be another Fiesta Bowl shutout until 2016, when Clemson blanked Ohio State on its way to a national championship.
- The season became a part of a successful 1993–94 school year for Wildcat sports, as the basketball team advanced to the Final Four and the softball team capturing a national title, somewhat overshadowing Arizona's successful football season.

== Team players drafted into the NFL ==
Player	Position	Round	Pick	NFL club
Chuck Levy	Running back	2	38	Arizona Cardinals
Rob Waldrop	Defensive lineman	5	156	Kansas City Chiefs
Roderick Lewis	Tight end	5	157	Houston Oilers
Brant Boyer	Linebacker	6	177	Miami Dolphins
