= Jerry Pettibone =

American football player and coach (born 1939)

Biographical details
- Born: July 11, 1939 (age 87); Detroit, Michigan, U.S.

Playing career
- 1958–1961: Oklahoma
- Position: Halfback

Coaching career (HC unless noted)
- 1962: Oklahoma (GA)
- 1965: Oklahoma (GA)
- 1966–1970: Oklahoma (assistant freshman)
- 1971: SMU (RC/freshman)
- 1972–1978: Oklahoma (RC)
- 1979–1981: Nebraska (RC/WR)
- 1982–1984: Texas A&M (AHC/WR/RC)
- 1985–1990: Northern Illinois
- 1991–1996: Oregon State

Administrative career (AD unless noted)
- 1996–1997: Oklahoma (assistant AD)

Head coaching record
- Overall: 46–84–2 (.356)

Jerry Pettibone (born July 11, 1939) is an American former football player and coach. He served as the head football coach at Northern Illinois University from 1985 to 1990 and Oregon State University from 1991 to 1996. compiling a career college football record of 46–84–2 (.356).

== Early life ==
Pettibone's football career started at Jesuit High School in Dallas, Texas. He earned All-State honors as a running back on the state championship football team in 1956 and 1957. He received the honor to be in the first class inducted into the Jesuit Sports Hall of Fame. After graduating from Jesuit High School, Pettibone received a scholarship to the University of Oklahoma in Norman, where he played halfback for the Sooners under head coach Bud Wilkinson.

== Coaching career ==
=== Assistant coach ===
Pettibone spent time as an assistant coach at the University of Oklahoma, the University of Nebraska–Lincoln, Southern Methodist University (SMU), and Texas A&M University. In his career as an assistant coach, he coached in 11 major bowl games and won eight Big Eight Conference championships. Teams he was with collectively produced a record of 168–64–3 (.721). He was with two national championship teams and helped to recruit 20 consensus All-Americans, two Heisman Trophy winners, two Outland Trophy winners and a Lombardi Award winner.

At Oklahoma, Pettibone was part of eight bowl games and was with two national championship teams. He was part of seven Big Eight championship teams at Oklahoma. Pettibone recruited running back Billy Sims, the Heisman Trophy winner in 1978 after rushing for 1,782 yards. One of Pettibone's early Oklahoma classes graduated 17 of 25 players into the National Football League. At Nebraska, he coached in three bowl games. As recruiting coordinator, he helped to recruit consensus All-Americans Irving Fryar, running back Mike Rozier and center Mark Traynowicz. Rozier won the Heisman Trophy in 1983 after rushing for 2,148 yards. At Texas A&M, Pettibone was named as 'No. 1 Recruiter in America' by Sports Illustrated. Pettibone's initial recruiting class at Texas A&M ranked first in the Southwest Conference and #5 in the nation. That class produced six Aggie starters the first year.

=== Head coach ===
Pettibone's first head coaching position was in 1985 at Northern Illinois University in the Mid-American Conference (MAC) and he led the Huskies for six seasons, the last five as an independent. Northern Illinois recorded a 9–2 record in 1989 to tie the best-ever record in history of the school. Pettibone was named Coach of the Year for major northern independent schools by Sporting News. NIU established four school records (most points, most touchdowns, most rushing touchdowns and most possession time) and the Huskies were ranked among the top 25 in five different categories. Northern Illinois recorded its first-ever victory over a ranked team (top 25) in 1990 when it routed #24 Fresno State 73–18 on October 6 in DeKalb. Northern Illinois also established 51 school records and seven NCAA records during Pettibone's final three years. With the Huskies, he posted a 33–32–1 (.508) record.

After the 1990 season, Pettibone left NIU in early December for the Pacific-10 Conference at Oregon State University in Corvallis, replacing Dave Kragthorpe. The contrasting styles of offenses made the transition very difficult; Kragthorpe ran an extremely pass oriented offense, while Pettibone preferred the running game and specifically the wishbone formation and the triple option. In his first two seasons at Oregon State, the team struggled, winning only one game in both 1991 and 1992. However, in 1993 and 1994, things started to click and the Beavers posted four wins each year. Oregon State finished second in the nation in rushing in 1993, and Pettibone was named co-runner-up for the Division I-A Coach of the Year honors by Sports Illustrated. In his fifth season in 1995, they fell to 1–10; after a 2–9 season in 1996, Pettibone resigned in late November, and was succeeded by Mike Riley in 1997.

== Later life and family ==
Pettibone left Corvallis to become the assistant athletic director at his alma mater Oklahoma in 1996. After one year, his position was terminated in the wake of budget cuts in the department.

Pettibone lives in Norman with his wife Susy and currently works for Sooners Helping Sooners, a non-profit that helps former OU student athletes find employment. In addition to his responsibilities with Sooners Helping Sooners he also has maintains a personal football evaluation service for high school and junior college athletes to help them determine what level their playing ability falls under, and how to navigate the college recruiting process.

== Head coaching record ==
Year	Team	Overall	Conference	Standing
Northern Illinois Huskies (Mid-American Conference) (1985)
1985	Northern Illinois	4–7	4–4	5th
Northern Illinois Huskies (Independent) (1986–1990)
1986	Northern Illinois	2–9		
1987	Northern Illinois	5–5–1		
1988	Northern Illinois	7–4		
1989	Northern Illinois	9–2		
1990	Northern Illinois	6–5		
Northern Illinois:		33–32–1	4–4	
Oregon State Beavers (Pacific-10 Conference) (1991–1996)
1991	Oregon State	1–10	1–7	T–9th
1992	Oregon State	1–9–1	0–7–1	10th
1993	Oregon State	4–7	2–6	T–8th
1994	Oregon State	4–7	2–6	T–8th
1995	Oregon State	1–10	0–8	10th
1996	Oregon State	2–9	1–7	10th
Oregon State:		13–52–1	6–41–1	
Total:		46–84–2		
