= Wayne Cook (American football) =

American football player (born 1971)

No. 15
- Position: Quarterback

Personal information
- Born: April 13, 1971 (age 55)
- Listed height: 6 ft 3 in (1.91 m)
- Listed weight: 200 lb (91 kg)

Career information
- High school: Newbury Park (Newbury Park, California)
- College: UCLA
- NFL draft: 1995: undrafted

Career history
- San Francisco 49ers (1995)*; Arizona Cardinals (1995)*
- * Offseason or practice squad member only

Wayne Cook (born April 13, 1971) is an American former college football player who was a quarterback for the UCLA Bruins. He led the Bruins to their first Rose Bowl in eight years during the 1993 season. Cook ended his UCLA career ranked third in Bruins history in touchdown passes (34). An undrafted free agent after college, he briefly tried out for the National Football League (NFL) with the San Francisco 49ers and Arizona Cardinals.

After his playing career, Cook became a high school teacher and golf coach. He joined the UCLA football radio broadcast team as a sideline reporter in 2002.

== Early life ==
Growing up in Newbury Park, California, Cook was a fan of the Arizona Wildcats. His father, Ken, played college football for the Wildcats as a 187-pound (85 kg) tight end and defensive tackle and was the most valuable player and team co-captain of their 1962 team. Cook attended Newbury Park High School, where he was a three-sport athlete in football, basketball and baseball. Basketball was his favorite. He figured that playing three sports increased his chances of earning a scholarship, but he was not sure which sport it would be in.

Cook played football for his father, who was Newbury Park's head coach. In Cook's junior year, their football team was 1–8–1 while he dealt with a sore left shoulder, undergoing arthroscopic surgery after the season. In basketball, he led the team in rebounding for the second consecutive year. Playing first base in baseball, he had a .337 batting average and led the team with 28 runs.

In his senior year, he completed 16 of 29 passes for 141 yards and carried 10 times for 62 yards in a 6–6 tie in their season opener against Agoura. UCLA head coach Terry Donahue attended the game (his daughter was an Agoura cheerleader) and was impressed with Cook's play. Days later during practice, Cook fractured his right wrist when a teammate fell on his thumb. He missed three weeks, rushing his comeback and playing with his hand heavily taped. His production dipped, ending the season 91 of 189 passing (48.1%) for 1,197 yards and eight touchdowns but only three interceptions in seven games. In basketball, Cook led Ventura County in scoring with 22.3 points per game and also averaged a team-high 10.0 rebounds, the third straight season he led the team. He finished ranked fourth on the school's career rebound list with 536.

Cook wanted to play college football for Arizona, but they tended to run under new coach Dick Tomey's option offense, while Cook was a pro-style quarterback. After his injury, schools stopped recruiting him, and UCLA was the only Pac-10 program that remained interested. The Bruins offered him a scholarship after Newbury Park's season finale, a 21–14 win over Royal in which he completed 10 of 13 passes for 127 yards.

== College career ==
Cook signed a letter of intent to play football at the University of California, Los Angeles, who days later landed two of the country's top quarterback recruits, Bert Emanuel and Tommy Maddox. Maddox became the starting quarterback in 1990, while Cook was on the scout team, emulating the upcoming opposing quarterback. Maddox excelled for two seasons before leaving for the 1992 NFL draft. A rangy quarterback, like Maddux, at 6 feet 3 inches (1.91 m) and 200 pounds (91 kg), Cook was named the starter in 1992, but suffered a season-ending injury in the first game against Cal State Fullerton. He completed eight of 13 passes for 155 yards and a touchdown in the game. He underwent reconstructive surgery for the torn anterior cruciate ligament in his right knee, and the Bruins finished the season 6–5 with Ryan Fien and Rob Walker playing quarterback.

Three days before the 1993 season opener, Cook was named the starter over Fien and Walker. The Bruins began the season 0–2 for the first time since 1971, losing the season opener against California that ended with a Cook interception at the Cal 28-yard line with 15 seconds remaining. The following week, he threw for a season-low 134 yards in a one-point loss to No. 8 Nebraska. However, UCLA emerged as a Rose Bowl contender, winning seven in a row, with Cook tying the single-game school record of four touchdown passes and becoming the first Bruin to reach the mark in consecutive games. (Note: Cook tied the single-game touchdown record held by Paul Cameron (1951), Jim Nader (1968), Tom Ramsey (1982), Rick Neuheisel (1984 Rose Bowl), Troy Aikman (1988), and Maddox (1991). The record stood until Cade McNown threw for five against Texas in 1997. Cook also held the school record of eight touchdown passes in two consecutive games until Drew Olson had 11 touchdown passes in 2005. Olson also broke Cook's three-game record of 11, surpassing it with 13.) He was out injured when they lost 9–3 to Arizona State. Cook was hurt the previous week when Washington State's DeWayne Patterson was offside and flattened him, injuring his right kidney and sending him to the hospital. The Bruins had scored 322 points in its first nine games with Cook before being held to a field goal in the loss without him. He returned the following week and threw for a touchdown and ran for another in a 27–21 win over USC, snapping a 10-game losing streak in their crosstown rivalry when the Rose Bowl was at stake for both teams. Cook became the first quarterback in eight years to lead UCLA to the Rose Bowl since Matt Stevens in 1985.

The Bruins lost 21–16 to Wisconsin in the 1994 Rose Bowl. On first and 10 from the Wisconsin 18-yard line with 15 seconds left in the game and no timeouts remaining, Cook ran the ball for three yards but was tackled and time expired. The play was intended to be a pass into the end zone, or spiking the ball and stopping the clock if it was not open. However, Cook said he "saw an opening and my natural instinct took over which was to run the ball. It was the wrong play." He finished 28 of 43 passing for 288 yards and a touchdown. The Bruins committed six turnovers, with Cook losing two fumbles and throwing an interception. They finished the season 8–4, and Cook completed 165 passes in 297 attempts for 2,067 yards, 18 touchdowns and just four interceptions. UCLA head coach Terry Donahue said that "what's been the most impressive about Wayne Cook is his touchdown-to-interception ratio". Fifteen of his scoring strikes were to All-American receiver J. J. Stokes, including a 95-yard pass against Washington that was the longest play in UCLA history. (Note: The previous high was a tie between a 93-yard pass from Mike Frankovich to Ransom Livesay against Oregon in 1932 and a 93-yard run by Chuck Cheshire against Montana in 1934.) Cook received honorable mention for the All-Pac-10 team.

UCLA was hampered by injuries in 1994, and lost six straight games. Fans were calling for Cook to be benched midseason. With Stokes back healthy, the Bruins recovered to win their next two games against Stanford and Arizona State, scoring a total of 90 points, more than in their entire losing streak. Cook threw for a career-high 380 yards and again tied the school record with four touchdowns to beat Arizona State 59–23. In their season finale, UCLA upset USC 31–19, their fourth straight win against their rivals. The loss denied the Trojans a berth in the Rose Bowl, while Cook became the first Bruins quarterback in 35 years to defeat the Trojans in consecutive seasons. In three straight wins to end the season, he was 52 of 72 passing for 894 yards and eight touchdowns.

Cook finished his career with 352 completions on 612 attempts (57.3%) for 4,753 yards. At the time, his 34 touchdown passes ranked third in UCLA history behind Tom Ramsey (50) and Troy Aikman (41). He had a 13–10 record as a starter.

== Professional career ==
On the final day of the 1995 NFL draft, Cook signed with the San Francisco 49ers as an undrafted free agent. He participated in two mini-camps before being cut. The 49ers invited four quarterbacks to training camp, choosing the veteran Cary Conklin over Cook to join Steve Young, Elvis Grbac, and Bob Gagliano. Cook then signed with the Arizona Cardinals. He entered training camp with three other quarterbacks—veterans Dave Krieg and Mike Buck and fellow rookie Stoney Case, a third-round draft pick who was roommates with Cook at the Blue-Gray Game. The Cardinals cut Cook ahead of the league's 60-player-limit deadline.

== Later life ==
After football, Cook became a social science teacher and golf coach at Chaparral High School in Temecula, California. In 2002, he started working part-time as a sideline reporter for UCLA football's radio broadcasts.
