= 1992 Arizona State Sun Devils football team =

American college football season

1992 Arizona State Sun Devils football
- Conference: Pacific-10 Conference
- Record: 6–5 (4–4 Pac-10)
- Head coach: Bruce Snyder (1st season)
- Offensive coordinator: Dan Cozzetto (1st season)
- Defensive coordinator: Kent Baer (1st season)
- Home stadium: Sun Devil Stadium

1992 Pacific-10 Conference football standings
	Conf.					Overall
Team	W		L		T	W		L		T
No. 11 Washington +	6	–	2	–	0	9	–	3	–	0
No. 9 Stanford +	6	–	2	–	0	10	–	3	–	0
No. 15 Washington State	5	–	3	–	0	9	–	3	–	0
USC	5	–	3	–	0	6	–	5	–	1
Arizona	4	–	3	–	1	6	–	5	–	1
Arizona State	4	–	4	–	0	6	–	5	–	0
Oregon	4	–	4	–	0	6	–	6	–	0
UCLA	3	–	5	–	0	6	–	5	–	0
California	2	–	6	–	0	4	–	7	–	0
Oregon State	0	–	7	–	1	1	–	9	–	1
+ – Conference co-champions; Rankings from AP Poll

The 1992 Arizona State Sun Devils football team was an American football team that represented Arizona State University as a member of the Pacific-10 Conference (Pac-10) during the 1992 NCAA Division I-A football season. In their first season under head coach Bruce Snyder, the Sun Devils compiled an overall record of 6–5 with a mark of 4–4 in conference play, tying for sixth place in the Pac-10, and outscored opponents 235 to 185. The team played home games at Sun Devil Stadium in Tempe, Arizona.

With a 20–0 victory on October 24, the Sun Devils ended UCLA's streak of 245 games, dating back to 1971, without being shut out. In the annual Arizona–Arizona State football rivalry game, the Sun Devils trailed, 6–0, in the fourth quarter when Kenneth Galbreath ran 51 yards for a game-winning touchdown.

The team ranked 15th in NCAA Division I-A in rushing defense, allowing 120.3 yards per game. They also ranked sixth in total defense, giving up 268.8 yards per game. The team's statistical leaders included Grady Benton with 1,707 passing yards, Jerone Davison with 734 rushing yards, and Eric Guliford with 506 receiving yards.

== Schedule ==
Date	Opponent	Site	Result	Attendance	Source
September 5	No. 2 Washington	Sun Devil Stadium; Tempe, AZ	L 7–31	53,782	
September 19	Louisville*	Sun Devil Stadium; Tempe, AZ	W 19–0	45,782	
September 26	at No. 15 Nebraska*	Memorial Stadium; Lincoln, NE	L 24–45	76,138	
October 3	at Oregon	Autzen Stadium; Eugene, OR	L 20–30	30,121	
October 10	Pacific (CA)*	Sun Devil Stadium; Tempe, AZ	W 39–5	40,317	
October 17	Oregon State	Sun Devil Stadium; Tempe, AZ	W 40–13	39,278	
October 24	at UCLA	Rose Bowl; Pasadena, CA	W 20–0	37,204	
October 31	No. 13 USC	Sun Devil Stadium; Tempe, AZ	L 13–23	51,096	
November 7	at No. 25 Washington State	Martin Stadium; Pullman, WA	L 18–20	15,441	
November 14	California	Sun Devil Stadium; Tempe, AZ	W 28–12	48,723	
November 21	at No. 16 Arizona	Arizona Stadium; Tucson, AZ (rivalry)	W 7–6	58,095	
*Non-conference game; Rankings from AP Poll released prior to the game

== Roster ==
1992 Arizona State Sun Devils football team roster
Players
Coaches
Offense

Pos.	#	Name	Class
RB	24	Mario Bates	Fr
WR	12	Eric Guliford
OT	75	Jeff Kysar	So
QB		Garrick McGee

Defense

Pos.	#	Name	Class
DE	98	Shante Carver	Jr
CB	4	Lenny McGill	Jr
LB	44	Brett Wallerstedt
DE	13	Gavin Hill	Sr
DL	9	Israel Stanley	Sr
DL	95	Bryan Hooks	Sr
LB	47	Mike Phair	Sr
CB	3	Kevin Miniefield	Sr

Special teams

Pos.	#	Name	Class

Head coach

- Bruce Snyder

Coordinators/assistant coaches

Legend

- (C) Team captain
- (S) Suspended
- (I) Ineligible
- Injured
- Redshirt
