= 1992 Washington Huskies football team =

American college football season

1992 Washington Huskies football

Pac-10 co-champion

Rose Bowl, L 31–38 vs. Michigan
- Conference: Pacific-10 Conference

Ranking
- Coaches: No. 10
- AP: No. 11
- Record: 9–3 (6–2 Pac-10)
- Head coach: Don James (18th season)
- Offensive coordinator: Jeff Woodruff (1st season)
- Defensive coordinator: Jim Lambright (15th season)
- MVP: Dave Hoffmann
- Captains: Mark Brunell; Dave Hoffmann; Lincoln Kennedy; Shane Pahukoa
- Home stadium: Husky Stadium

1992 Pacific-10 Conference football standings
	Conf.					Overall
Team	W		L		T	W		L		T
No. 11 Washington +	6	–	2	–	0	9	–	3	–	0
No. 9 Stanford +	6	–	2	–	0	10	–	3	–	0
No. 15 Washington State	5	–	3	–	0	9	–	3	–	0
USC	5	–	3	–	0	6	–	5	–	1
Arizona	4	–	3	–	1	6	–	5	–	1
Arizona State	4	–	4	–	0	6	–	5	–	0
Oregon	4	–	4	–	0	6	–	6	–	0
UCLA	3	–	5	–	0	6	–	5	–	0
California	2	–	6	–	0	4	–	7	–	0
Oregon State	0	–	7	–	1	1	–	9	–	1
+ – Conference co-champions; Rankings from AP Poll

The 1992 Washington Huskies football team was an American football team that represented the University of Washington during the 1992 NCAA Division I-A football season. In its eighteenth and final season under head coach Don James, the defending national champion Huskies won their first eight games and took the Pacific-10 Conference title for the third consecutive season.

Attempting to win a third straight Rose Bowl, the Huskies lost to Michigan Wolverines football team by seven points and finished with a 9–3 record. Washington outscored its opponents 337 to 186.

Dave Hoffmann was selected as the team's most valuable player. Hoffmann, Mark Brunell, Lincoln Kennedy, and Shane Pahukoa were the team captains.

== Schedule ==
Date	Time	Opponent	Rank	Site	TV	Result	Attendance	Source
September 5	7:30 p.m.	at Arizona State	No. 2	Sun Devil Stadium; Tempe, AZ	Prime	W 31–7	53,782	
September 12	12:30 p.m.	Wisconsin*	No. 2	Husky Stadium; Seattle, WA		W 27–10	72,800	
September 19	6:45 p.m.	No. 12 Nebraska*	No. 2	Husky Stadium; Seattle, WA	ESPN	W 29–14	73,333	
October 3	12:30 p.m.	No. 20 USC	No. 1	Husky Stadium; Seattle, WA	ABC	W 17–10	73,275	
October 10	12:30 p.m.	No. 24 California	No. 1	Husky Stadium; Seattle, WA	ABC	W 35–16	73,504	
October 17	1:00 p.m.	at Oregon	No. 1	Autzen Stadium; Eugene, OR (rivalry)		W 24–3	47,612	
October 24	12:30 p.m.	Pacific (CA)*	No. 1	Husky Stadium; Seattle, WA		W 31–7	70,618	
October 31	12:30 p.m.	No. 15 Stanford	No. 2	Husky Stadium; Seattle, WA	ABC	W 41–7	70,821	
November 7	12:30 p.m.	at No. 12 Arizona	No. 1	Arizona Stadium; Tucson, AZ	ABC	L 3–16	58,510	
November 14	12:30 p.m.	Oregon State	No. 6	Husky Stadium; Seattle, WA		W 45–16	70,149	
November 21	12:30 p.m.	at No. 25 Washington State	No. 5	Martin Stadium; Pullman, WA (Apple Cup)	ABC	L 23–42	37,600	
January 1, 1993	1:45 p.m.	vs. No. 7 Michigan*	No. 9	Rose Bowl; Pasadena, CA (Rose Bowl)	ABC	L 31–38	94,236	
*Non-conference game; Rankings from AP Poll released prior to the game; All times are in Pacific time; Source:

== Rankings ==
Ranking movements Legend: ██ Increase in ranking ██ Decrease in ranking т = Tied with team above or below ( ) = First-place votes
	Week																
Poll	Pre	1	2	3	4	5	6	7	8	9	10	11	12	13	14	15	Final
AP	2 (12)	2 (9)	2 (9)	2 (11)	2 (15)	1 (44)	1 (42)	1 (30 1/2)	1 т (30)	2 (29)	1 (33 1/2)	6	5	11	10	9	11
Coaches	2 (14)	2 (12)	2 (13)	2 (13)	2 (15)	1 (43)	1 (38)	2 (29)	2 (29)	2 (22)	2 (30)	7	5	13	11	11	10

== Game summaries ==
=== Nebraska ===
Nebraska at Washington

Team	1	2	3	4	Total
No. 12 Cornhuskers	0	7	7	0	14
• No. 2 Huskies	2	21	3	3	29

- Date: September 19
- Location: Husky Stadium, Seattle
- Game attendance: 73,333

The Nebraska game on September 19 was the first night game at Husky Stadium and Washington's seventeenth consecutive win. During the game, ESPN measured the noise level at over 130 decibels, well above the threshold of pain. The peak recorded level of 133.6 decibels is the highest ever recorded at a college football stadium.

=== Vs. Michigan (Rose Bowl) ===
Michigan vs. Washington

Team	1	2	3	4	Total
• No. 7 Wolverines	10	7	14	7	38
No. 9 Huskies	7	14	10	0	31

- Date: January 1
- Location: Rose Bowl, Pasadena, California
- Game attendance: 94,236

== Roster ==
1992 Washington Huskies football team roster
Players
Coaches
Offense

Pos.	#	Name	Class
RB	42	Jay Barry	Sr
SE	14	Eric Bjornson	So
TE	85	Mark Bruener	So
QB	11	Mark Brunell (C)	Sr
RB	29	Beno Bryant	Sr
TE	82	Ernie Conwell	Fr
OT	66	Tom Gallagher	Jr
C	65	Frank Garcia	So
QB	7	Damon Huard	Fr
RB	24	Eteka Huckaby	So
QB	12	Billy Joe Hobert	Jr
FB	22	Matt Jones	Jr
G	56	Pete Kaligis	Sr
RB	8	Napoleon Kaufman	So
OT	75	Lincoln Kennedy (C)	Sr
SE	9	Joe Kralik	Jr
SE	6	Damon Mack	Sr
TE	84	Joel McHale	Fr
C	52	Jim Nevelle	Jr
OT	71	Pete Pierson	Jr
G	60	Andrew Peterson	So
SE	18	Jason Shelley	Fr
FB	31	Darius Turner	Sr

Defense

Pos.	#	Name	Class
CB	23	Walter Bailey	Sr
LB	53	James Clifford	Sr
DT	75	D'Marco Farr	Jr
OLB	3	Jaime Fields	Sr
LB	47	Jamal Fountaine	Jr
ILB	54	Dave Hoffmann (C)	Sr
MG	74	Mike Lustyk	Sr
DE	13	Andy Mason	Jr
CB	7	Josh Moore	So
FS	21	Shane Pahukoa (C)	Sr
ROV	20	Tommie Smith	Sr

Special teams

Pos.	#	Name	Class
K	4	Travis Hanson	Jr
P	16	John Werdel	Jr

Head coach

- Don James (18th year)

Coordinators/assistant coaches

- Jim Lambright (DC, LB)
- Jeff Woodruff (OC, QB)
- Miles Corrigan (TE)
- Randy Hart (DL)
- Al Lavan (RB)
- Ron Milus (CB)
- Steve Morton (OL)
- Chris Tormey (S)
- Bill Wentworth (WR)
- Rick Mallory (GA)

Legend

- (C) Team captain
- (S) Suspended
- (I) Ineligible
- Injured
- Redshirt

== NFL draft selections ==
The following Washington players were selected in the 1993 NFL draft:

Player	Position	Round	Pick	NFL club
Lincoln Kennedy	OT	1	9	Atlanta Falcons
Billy Joe Hobert	QB	3	58	Los Angeles Raiders
Jaime Fields	LB	4	103	Kansas City Chiefs
Mark Brunell	QB	5	118	Green Bay Packers
Dave Hoffmann	LB	6	146	Chicago Bears
Darius Turner	FB	6	159	Kansas City Chiefs

- This draft was eight rounds, with 224 selections
