= 1993 Arizona State Sun Devils football team =

American college football season

1993 Arizona State Sun Devils football
- Conference: Pacific-10 Conference
- Record: 6–5 (4–4 Pac-10)
- Head coach: Bruce Snyder (2nd season)
- Offensive coordinator: Dan Cozzetto (2nd season)
- Defensive coordinator: Kent Baer (2nd season)
- Home stadium: Sun Devil Stadium

1993 Pacific-10 Conference football standings
	Conf.					Overall
Team	W		L		T	W		L		T
No. 10 Arizona +	6	–	2	–	0	10	–	2	–	0
No. 18 UCLA +	6	–	2	–	0	8	–	4	–	0
USC +	6	–	2	–	0	8	–	5	–	0
Washington	5	–	3	–	0	7	–	4	–	0
No. 25 California	4	–	4	–	0	9	–	4	–	0
Arizona State	4	–	4	–	0	6	–	5	–	0
Washington State	3	–	5	–	0	5	–	6	–	0
Oregon	2	–	6	–	0	5	–	6	–	0
Oregon State	2	–	6	–	0	4	–	7	–	0
Stanford	2	–	6	–	0	4	–	7	–	0
+ – Conference co-champions; Rankings from AP Poll

The 1993 Arizona State Sun Devils football team was an American football team that represented Arizona State University as a member of the Pacific-10 Conference (Pac-10) during the 1993 NCAA Division I-A football season. In their second season under head coach Bruce Snyder, the Sun Devils compiled an overall record of 6–5 with a mark of 4–4 in conference play, tying for fifth place in the Pac-10, and outscored opponents 282 to 248. The team played home games at Sun Devil Stadium in Tempe, Arizona.

The team's statistical leaders included Jake Plummer with 1,650 passing yards, Mario Bates with 1,111 rushing yards, and Johnny Thomas with 574 receiving yards.

== Schedule ==
Date	Opponent	Rank	Site	Result	Attendance
September 4	Utah*		Sun Devil Stadium; Tempe, AZ	W 38–0	48,809
September 18	at Louisville*	No. 23	Cardinal Stadium; Louisville, KY	L 17–35	39,639
September 25	Oklahoma State*		Sun Devil Stadium; Tempe, AZ	W 12–10	46,344
October 2	Oregon State		Sun Devil Stadium; Tempe, AZ	L 14–30	
October 9	at Washington State		Martin Stadium; Pullman, WA	L 25–44	27,077
October 16	Oregon		Sun Devil Stadium; Tempe, AZ	L 36–45	32,625
October 23	at Stanford		Stanford Stadium; Stanford, CA	W 38–30	46,500
October 30	No. 19 Washington		Sun Devil Stadium; Tempe, AZ	W 32–17	48,116
November 6	California		Sun Devil Stadium; Tempe, AZ	W 41–0	
November 13	at No. 10 UCLA		Rose Bowl; Pasadena, CA	W 9–3	40,346
November 26	No. 19 Arizona		Sun Devil Stadium; Tempe, AZ (rivalry)	L 20–34	73,115
*Non-conference game; Rankings from AP Poll released prior to the game

== Roster ==
1993 Arizona State Sun Devils football team roster
Players
Coaches
Offense

Pos.	#	Name	Class
RB	24	Mario Bates	So
TE	82	Steve Bush	Fr
OT	75	Jeff Kysar	Jr
TE	87	Matt Nelson	Jr
QB	16	Jake Plummer	Fr
WR	3	Keith Poole	Fr

Defense

Pos.	#	Name	Class
DE	98	Shante Carver	Sr
LB	12	Jason Kyle	Jr
CB	7	Craig Newsome	Jr
CB	4	Lenny McGill	Sr
DT	99	Shawn Swayda	Fr

Special teams

Pos.	#	Name	Class
K	11	Jon Baker	Jr

Head coach

- Bruce Snyder

Coordinators/assistant coaches

Legend

- (C) Team captain
- (S) Suspended
- (I) Ineligible
- Injured
- Redshirt
