= 1993 California Golden Bears football team =

American college football season

1993 California Golden Bears football

Alamo Bowl champion

Alamo Bowl, W 37–3 vs. Iowa
- Conference: Pacific-10 Conference

Ranking
- Coaches: No. 24
- AP: No. 25
- Record: 9–4 (4–4 Pac-10)
- Head coach: Keith Gilbertson (2nd season)
- Offensive coordinator: Denny Schuler (1st season)
- Defensive coordinator: Artie Gigantino (2nd season)
- Home stadium: California Memorial Stadium

1993 Pacific-10 Conference football standings
	Conf.					Overall
Team	W		L		T	W		L		T
No. 10 Arizona +	6	–	2	–	0	10	–	2	–	0
No. 18 UCLA +	6	–	2	–	0	8	–	4	–	0
USC +	6	–	2	–	0	8	–	5	–	0
Washington	5	–	3	–	0	7	–	4	–	0
No. 25 California	4	–	4	–	0	9	–	4	–	0
Arizona State	4	–	4	–	0	6	–	5	–	0
Washington State	3	–	5	–	0	5	–	6	–	0
Oregon	2	–	6	–	0	5	–	6	–	0
Oregon State	2	–	6	–	0	4	–	7	–	0
Stanford	2	–	6	–	0	4	–	7	–	0
+ – Conference co-champions; Rankings from AP Poll

The 1993 California Golden Bears football team was an American football team that represented the University of California, Berkeley as a member of the Pacific-10 Conference (Pac-10) during the 1993 NCAA Division I-A football season. In their second year under head coach Keith Gilbertson, the Golden Bears compiled an overall record of 9–4 record with a mark of 4–4 in conference play, tying for fifth place in the Pac-10, and outscored opponents 411 to 303. California was invited to the Alamo Bowl, where the Golden Bears defeated Iowa. The team played home games at California Memorial Stadium in Berkeley, California.

The team's statistical leaders included Dave Barr with 2,619 passing yards, Lindsey Chapman with 1,037 rushing yards, and Mike Caldwell with 962 receiving yards.

== Schedule ==
Date	Opponent	Rank	Site	TV	Result	Attendance	Source
September 4	at UCLA		Rose Bowl; Los Angeles, CA (rivalry)		W 27–25	53,634	
September 11	San Diego State*		California Memorial Stadium; Berkeley, CA	Prime	W 45–25	42,000	
September 18	at Temple*	No. 21	Veterans Stadium; Philadelphia, PA		W 58–0		
September 25	San Jose State*	No. 20	California Memorial Stadium; Berkeley, CA		W 46–13		
October 2	Oregon	No. 17	California Memorial Stadium; Berkeley, CA		W 42–41	34,000	
October 9	No. 13 Washington	No. 16	California Memorial Stadium; Berkeley, CA	ABC	L 23–24	55,000	
October 16	at Washington State	No. 21	Martin Stadium; Pullman, WA		L 7–34	30,117	
October 30	USC		California Memorial Stadium; Berkeley, CA	ABC	L 14–42	56,000	
November 6	at Arizona State		Sun Devil Stadium; Tempe, AZ		L 0–41		
November 13	No. 13 Arizona		California Memorial Stadium; Berkeley, CA	ABC	W 24–20	35,000	
November 20	at Stanford		Stanford Stadium; Stanford, CA (Big Game)		W 46–17	82,500	
November 27	at Hawaii*		Aloha Stadium; Halawa, HI		W 42–18	41,260	
December 31	vs. Iowa*		Alamodome; San Antonio, TX (Alamo Bowl)	ESPN	W 37–3	45,716	
*Non-conference game; Rankings from AP Poll released prior to the game

== Game summaries ==
=== Vs. Iowa (Alamo Bowl) ===
California vs. Iowa

Team	1	2	3	4	Total
• Golden Bears	6	17	7	7	37
Hawkeyes	0	0	3	0	3

- Date: December 31
- Location: Alamodome, San Antonio, Texas
- Game attendance: 45,716
- Game weather: Indoors
- Referee: Gene Wurtz
- TV announcers (ESPN): Sean McDonough, Todd Blackledge, Dave Sims

Scoring summary
1	10:52	Cal	Doug Brien 37-yard field goal	Cal 3–0
1	2:45	Cal	Brien 20-yard field goal	Cal 6–0
2	11:02	Cal	Brien 30-yard field goal	Cal 9–0
2	0:35	Cal	Caldwell 6-yard pass from Dave Barr (Brien kick)	Cal 16–0
2	0:00	Cal	Willard 61-yard interception return (Brien kick)	Cal 23–0
3	10:00	Iowa	Hurley 42-yard field goal	Cal 23–3
3	4:05	Cal	Uwaezuoke 34-yard pass from Barr (Brien kick)	Cal 30–3
4	7:59	Cal	Remington 12-yard pass from Barr (Brien kick)	Cal 37–3
