= Jim Lambright =

American football player and coach (1942–2020)

Biographical details
- Born: April 26, 1942; Everett, Washington, U.S.
- Died: March 29, 2020 (aged 77)

Playing career
- 1962–1964: Washington
- Position: Defensive end

Coaching career (HC unless noted)
- 1965: Fife HS (WA) (assistant)
- 1966–1968: Shoreline CC (assistant)
- 1969–1977: Washington (assistant)
- 1978–1992: Washington (DC)
- 1993–1998: Washington

Head coaching record
- Overall: 44–25–1 (.636)
- Bowls: 1–3

Accomplishments and honors

Championships
- 1 Pac-10 (1995)

Awards
- First-team All-PCC (1964)

James Ralph Lambright (April 26, 1942 – March 29, 2020) was an American college football coach and player. He served as the head coach at the University of Washington for six seasons, from 1993 to 1998, compiling a record of 44–25–1 (.636). Prior to becoming head coach, Lambright served as an assistant on the Huskies coaching staff for 24 seasons.

== Early life ==
Born and raised in Everett, Washington, Lambright's father was a fisherman. He played football for head coach Jim Ennis at Everett High School and graduated in 1960. Lambright earned a scholarship to the University of Washington in Seattle, where he lettered as an undersized defensive end for head coach Jim Owens, earning all-conference and All-Coast honors as a senior for the Huskies in 1964.

== Coaching career ==
Following graduation, Lambright was an assistant coach at Fife High School for a season in 1965 and then at Shoreline Community College. In 1969, Owens hired him as an assistant coach on the Huskies' staff. New head coach Don James retained him in 1975 and Lambright became the team's defensive coordinator in 1978, and assistant head coach in 1987.

Lambright was an assistant coach for the Huskies for 24 seasons when he was elevated to head coach in late August 1993, following James' sudden resignation in protest of sanctions against the program from the NCAA and Pac-10 Conference, namely a two-year bowl ban. Lambright's initial contract as head coach was a four-year deal with a base salary of $150,000; he was earning $95,400 as James' chief assistant. He signed a contract extension in January 1998 that brought his compensation to over $500,000 annually. As the Huskies' defensive coordinator Lambright designed the team's "Purple Reign" defensive schemes.

After six seasons as head coach and three decades on staff, Lambright was relieved of his duties by athletic director Barbara Hedges in late December 1998 after select alums advised Hedges to do so. He was replaced by Rick Neuheisel by early January of 1999.

== Personal life and death ==
In the decade before his death Lambright struggled from short-term memory loss. Lambright died from complications of dementia on March 29, 2020. His brain was donated to the school's Medicine Brain Repository and Integrated Research (BRaIN) laboratory by Lambright's two children Kris and Eric to study for chronic traumatic encephalopathy. The study of his brain found high-stage CTE, Alzheimer’s disease, and Lewy body disease.

== Head coaching record ==
Year	Team	Overall	Conference	Standing	Bowl/playoffs	Coaches^{#}	AP^{°}
Washington Huskies (Pacific-10 Conference) (1993–1998)
1993	Washington	7–4	5–3	4th			
1994	Washington	7–4	4–4	5th			
1995	Washington	7–4–1	6–1–1	T–1st	L Sun		
1996	Washington	9–3	7–1	2nd	L Holiday	15	16
1997	Washington	8–4	5–3	4th	W Aloha	18	18
1998	Washington	6–6	4–4	T–5th	L Oahu		
Washington:		44–25–1	31–16–1				
Total:		44–25–1					
National championship Conference title Conference division title or championship game berth
^{#}Rankings from final Coaches Poll.; ^{°}Rankings from final AP Poll.
