= 1993 Washington State Cougars football team =

American college football season

1993 Washington State Cougars football
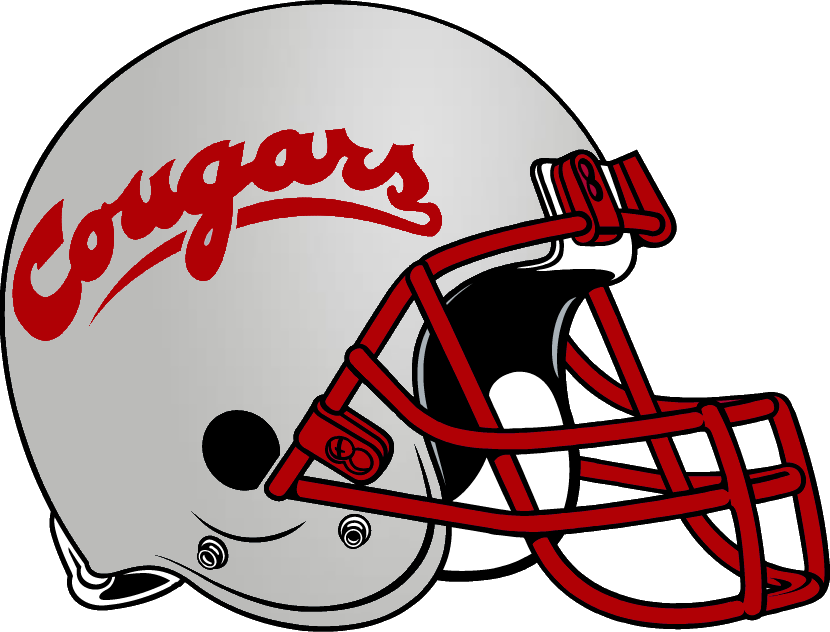
- Conference: Pacific-10 Conference
- Record: 5–6 (3–5 Pac-10)
- Head coach: Mike Price (5th season)
- Offensive coordinator: Ted Williams (2nd season)
- Offensive scheme: Spread
- Defensive coordinator: Mike Zimmer (5th season)
- Base defense: 4–3
- Home stadium: Martin Stadium

1993 Pacific-10 Conference football standings
	Conf.					Overall
Team	W		L		T	W		L		T
No. 10 Arizona +	6	–	2	–	0	10	–	2	–	0
No. 18 UCLA +	6	–	2	–	0	8	–	4	–	0
USC +	6	–	2	–	0	8	–	5	–	0
Washington	5	–	3	–	0	7	–	4	–	0
No. 25 California	4	–	4	–	0	9	–	4	–	0
Arizona State	4	–	4	–	0	6	–	5	–	0
Washington State	3	–	5	–	0	5	–	6	–	0
Oregon	2	–	6	–	0	5	–	6	–	0
Oregon State	2	–	6	–	0	4	–	7	–	0
Stanford	2	–	6	–	0	4	–	7	–	0
+ – Conference co-champions; Rankings from AP Poll

The 1993 Washington State Cougars football team was an American football team that represented Washington State University in the Pacific-10 Conference (Pac-10) during the 1993 NCAA Division I-A football season. In their fifth season under head coach Mike Price, the Cougars compiled a 5–6 record (3–5 in Pac-10, seventh), and outscored their opponents 271 to 248.

The team's statistical leaders included Mike Pattinson with 1,430 passing yards, Kevin Hicks with 497 rushing yards, and Deron Pointer with 996 receiving yards.

Starting quarterback Pattinson, a fifth-year senior from nearby Moscow, suffered a broken collarbone at homecoming against #21 California in mid-October and was lost for the season. Shawn Deeds came off the bench to lead the WSU to a decisive victory and a #25 ranking at 5–2, but the Cougars lost the next four games with Chad DeGrenier and Deeds at quarterback.

== Schedule ==
Date	Time	Opponent	Rank	Site	Result	Attendance	Source
September 4	12:30 p.m.	at No. 3 Michigan*		Michigan Stadium; Ann Arbor, MI	L 14–41	105,512	
September 11		Montana State*		Martin Stadium; Pullman, WA	W 54–14	19,068	
September 18		Oregon State		Martin Stadium; Pullman, WA	W 51–6	24,682	
September 25	7:00 p.m.	at USC		Los Angeles Memorial Coliseum; Los Angeles, CA	L 3–34	48,471	
October 2		at Pacific (CA)*		Stagg Memorial Stadium; Stockton, CA	W 12–0	14,616	
October 9		Arizona State		Martin Stadium; Pullman, WA	W 44–25	27,077	
October 16		No. 21 California^{†}		Martin Stadium; Pullman, WA	W 34–7	30,117	
October 23		at No. 7 Arizona	No. 25	Arizona Stadium; Tucson, AZ	L 6–9	46,675	
October 30		at Oregon		Autzen Stadium; Eugene, OR	L 23–46	35,846	
November 6		No. 12 UCLA		Martin Stadium; Pullman, WA	L 27–40	34,987	
November 20	12:30 p.m.	at Washington		Husky Stadium; Seattle, WA (Apple Cup)	L 3–26	72,688	
*Non-conference game; ^{†}Homecoming; Rankings from AP Poll released prior to the game; All times are in Pacific time

== Roster ==
1993 Washington State Cougars football team roster
Players
Coaches
Offense

Pos.	#	Name	Class
OT	75	Michael Bailey	Sr
TE	89	Brett Carolan	Sr
QB	15	Shawn Deeds	So
QB	2	Chad DeGrenier	Jr
WR	21	Shane DeLaCruz	Sr
G	61	Josh Dunning	Sr
RB	3	Will Haskell
RB	23	Kevin Hicks	Jr
RB	43	Delton Johnson	Jr
C	68	Marc McCloskey	So
QB	13	Mike Pattinson	Sr
WR	9	Deron Pointer	Sr
G	50	Paul Reed	Sr
OT	70	Clay Reis	Jr
WR	3	Keith Reynolds	Sr

Defense

Pos.	#	Name	Class
CB	27	Greg Burns	Jr
LB	31	Ron Childs	Jr
DT	90	Chad Eaton	Jr
LB	29	Mark Fields	Jr
LB	56	T.J. Folkers	Sr
DT	69	Brian Ford	Sr
DE	92	Ray Hall	Sr
LB	22	Chris Hayes	So
CB	24	Torey Hunter	Jr
LB	41	Anthony McClanahan	Sr
SS	8	Singor Mobley	Jr
LB		Johnny Nansen	Fr
DE	86	DeWayne Patterson	Jr
DB	10	John Rushing	Jr
DE	94	Don Sasa	Sr

Special teams

Pos.	#	Name	Class
P	28	Steve Johnston	Sr
PK	12	Aaron Price	Sr

Head coach

- Mike Price (5th year)

Coordinators/assistant coaches

- Ted Williams – OC
- Mike Zimmer – DC
- Bill Doba – LB

Legend

- (C) Team captain
- (S) Suspended
- (I) Ineligible
- Injured
- Redshirt

== NFL draft ==
For the first time in three years, no Cougars were selected in the 1994 NFL draft; four were selected the following year.
