= Kwame Ellis =

American football player (born 1974)

No. 38, 36
- Position: Defensive back

Personal information
- Born: February 27, 1974 (age 52); Berkeley, California, U.S.
- Listed height: 5 ft 10 in (1.78 m)
- Listed weight: 188 lb (85 kg)

Career information
- High school: Skyline (Oakland, California)
- College: Stanford (1992–1995)
- NFL draft: 1996: undrafted

Career history
- New York Jets (1996); Minnesota Vikings (1996-1997)*; Kansas City Chiefs (1998)*; Scottish Claymores (1998); Atlanta Falcons (1998)*; Milwaukee Mustangs (1999)*; Iowa Barnstormers (1999)*
- * Offseason or practice squad member only

Career NFL statistics
- Games played: 8
- Stats at Pro Football Reference

Kwame Delaney Ellis (born February 27, 1974) is an American former professional football player who was a defensive back for the New York Jets of the National Football League (NFL) in 1996. He played college football for the Stanford Cardinal.
