= Tim Camp =

American college football coach (born 1973)

Current position
- Title: Head coach
- Team: Waynesville High School (MO)
- Conference: MSHSAA
- Record: 0-6

Biographical details
- Born: April 9, 1973 (age 53); Gresham, Oregon, U.S.
- Education: Oregon State University (1995)

Playing career
- 1991–1995: Oregon State
- 1996: San Diego Chargers*
- Position: Left tackle

Coaching career (HC unless noted)
- 1996: Western Oregon (OL)
- 1997: Sewanee (DL)
- 1998–1999: Sewanee (OL)
- 2000–2001: Sewanee (OC/OL)
- 2002 (spring): Randolph–Macon (OC/OL)
- 2002: Nebraska–Omaha (TE/OL)
- 2003: Bucknell (OL)
- 2004–2005: Bucknell (OC/OL)
- 2006–2007: Eastern Oregon (OL)
- 2008–2025: Eastern Oregon
- 2026–present: Waynesville High School (MO)

Head coaching record
- Overall: 91–96 (college); 0–6 (high school)
- Tournaments: 2–1 (NAIA playoffs)

Accomplishments and honors

Championships
- 1 Frontier (2020)

Awards
- Second-team All-Pac-10 (1995)

Timothy David Camp (born April 9, 1973) is an American college football coach. He is the head football coach for Waynesville High School in Waynesville, Missouri, a position he has held since 2026. Camp previously served as the head football coach at Eastern Oregon University from 2008 to 2025. In 18 seasons leading the Eastern Oregon Mountaineers, he compiled an overall record of 91–96, becoming the program's all-time winningest head coach and guiding the Mountaineers to national prominence in the NAIA.

== Playing career ==
Camp grew up in Gresham, Oregon, and was the son of Jerry and Darlene Camp. He played high school football for Barlow High School under head coach Coy Zimmerman. He was a two-year starter and letterman at both offensive tackle and defensive tackle. He played college football for Oregon State. After redshirting his freshman year and playing as a reserve tackle he was a three-year starter at left tackle from 1993 to 1995. Following his graduation he was signed by the San Diego Chargers of the National Football League (NFL) on April 27, 1996. He was released on June 26, 1996.

== Coaching career ==
Camp began his coaching career in 1996 as the offensive line coach for Western Oregon. After one year he was named defensive line coach for Sewanee. In 1998, he switched to the offensive line coach. In 2000, he was promoted to offensive coordinator. In 2002, he spent the spring as the offensive coordinator and offensive line coach for Randolph–Macon. In the fall of 2002, he was hired as the tight ends coach and offensive line coach for Nebraska–Omaha. In 2003, he was hired as the offensive line coach for Bucknell. The following year he was promoted to offensive coordinator.

In 2006, Camp was hired as the offensive line coach for Eastern Oregon. In 2008, he was promoted to head football coach following the departure of Ian Shields. Over 18 seasons as head coach, he compiled a 91–96 record and led the Mountaineers to multiple national rankings and a semifinal appearance in the 2016 NAIA football playoffs.

In November 2025, Eastern Oregon announced that Camp would be stepping aside as head coach as the university began a transition in leadership. Defensive coordinator Solo Taylor was named interim head coach while the school conducted a national search for Camp's successor.

== Head coaching record ==
=== College ===
Year	Team	Overall	Conference	Standing	Bowl/playoffs	Coaches^{#}
Eastern Oregon Mountaineers (Frontier Conference) (2008–2025)
2008	Eastern Oregon	5–6	4–6	T–3rd		
2009	Eastern Oregon	7–4	7–3	T–2nd		22
2010	Eastern Oregon	5–6	5–5	T–3rd		
2011	Eastern Oregon	8–3	8–2	2nd		20
2012	Eastern Oregon	4–6	4–6	T–5th		
2013	Eastern Oregon	6–5	6–4	4th		25
2014	Eastern Oregon	8–3	7–3	3rd		15
2015	Eastern Oregon	4–7	4–6	T–4th		
2016	Eastern Oregon	10–3	8–2	2nd	L NAIA Semifinal	5
2017	Eastern Oregon	4–6	4–6	T–5th		
2018	Eastern Oregon	6–4	6–4	T–2nd		
2019	Eastern Oregon	4–7	4–6	T–5th		
2020–21	Eastern Oregon	3–1	3–1	T–1st		21
2021	Eastern Oregon	4–6	4–6	6th		
2022	Eastern Oregon	2–9	2–8	7th		
2023	Eastern Oregon	2–8	2–6	7th		
2024	Eastern Oregon	5–6	4–4	6th		
2025	Eastern Oregon	4–6	3–3	4th (West)		
Eastern Oregon:		91–96	85–81			
Total:		91–96				
National championship Conference title Conference division title or championship game berth

=== High school football ===
Year	Team	Overall	Conference	Standing	Bowl/playoffs
Waynesville High School (MO) (MSHSAA) (2026–present)
2026	Waynesville	0–6			
Waynesville:		0–6			
Total:		0–6			
National championship Conference title Conference division title or championship game berth
