= Stanford–UCLA football rivalry =

American college football rivalry game

- Stanford Cardinal UCLA Bruins
- First meeting: November 14, 1925; Stanford, 82–0
- Latest meeting: October 21, 2023; UCLA, 42–7
- Next meeting: TBD
- Trophy: None

Statistics
- Total meetings: 95
- All-time series: UCLA leads, 49–43–3
- Largest victory: Stanford, 82–0 (1925)
- Longest win streak: Stanford, 11 (2009–18)
- Current win streak: UCLA, 3 (2021–present)

Locations of Stanford and UCLA

The Stanford–UCLA football rivalry is an American college football rivalry game between the Stanford Cardinal and UCLA Bruins.

== History ==
The West Coast in-state rivals have spent much of their respective athletics histories as members of the same conference; first the Pacific Coast Conference from 1925 to 1958 followed by the various predecessors of the modern day Pac-12 Conference from 1959 to 2023. The teams met annually from 1946 to 2023 without interruption. The rivalry has seen its fair share of excitement throughout its history, but reached its peak in the 21st century when both teams were consistently ranked in the top 25 and had numerous competitive games against each other. With the collapse of the Pac-12 following the 2023 season, which resulted in Stanford leaving to join the Atlantic Coast Conference (ACC) and UCLA accepting an invitation to join the Big Ten Conference, the annual series between the Cardinal and Bruins was put on hiatus. As of 2026, there are no plans for the schools to meet again on the football field.

== Game results ==
Stanford victories	UCLA victories	Tie games

No.	Date	Location	Winning team		Losing team	
1	November 14, 1925	Stanford, CA	Stanford	82	UCLA	0
2	October 13, 1928	Stanford, CA	Stanford	45	UCLA	7
3	October 12, 1929	Los Angeles, CA	Stanford	57	UCLA	0
4	October 31, 1930	Los Angeles, CA	Stanford	20	UCLA	0
5	October 31, 1931	Stanford, CA	Stanford	12	UCLA	6
6	October 29, 1932	Los Angeles, CA	UCLA	13	Stanford	6
7	September 30, 1933	Stanford, CA	Stanford	3	UCLA	0
8	November 3, 1934	Los Angeles, CA	Stanford	27	UCLA	0
9	October 19, 1935	Stanford, CA	UCLA	7	Stanford	6
10	October 31, 1936	Los Angeles, CA	Stanford	19	UCLA	6
11	October 9, 1937	Stanford, CA	Stanford	12	UCLA	7
12	October 29, 1938	Los Angeles, CA	UCLA	6	Stanford	0
13	October 14, 1939	Stanford, CA	Tie	14	Tie	14
14	November 2, 1940	Los Angeles, CA	No. 6 Stanford	20	UCLA	14
15	October 4, 1941	Stanford, CA	Stanford	33	UCLA	0
16	October 31, 1942	Los Angeles, CA	No. 11 UCLA	20	Stanford	7
17	October 12, 1946	Los Angeles, CA	No. 5 UCLA	26	No. 17 Stanford	6
18	October 18, 1947	Stanford, CA	No. 19 UCLA	39	Stanford	6
19	October 16, 1948	Los Angeles, CA	Stanford	34	UCLA	14
20	October 8, 1949	Stanford, CA	No. 18 UCLA	14	Stanford	7
21	October 21, 1950	Los Angeles, CA	UCLA	21	No. 6 Stanford	7
22	October 13, 1951	Stanford, CA	No. 19 Stanford	21	UCLA	7
23	October 18, 1952	Los Angeles, CA	No. 10 UCLA	24	No. 13 Stanford	14
24	October 17, 1953	Stanford, CA	Stanford	21	No. 4 UCLA	20
25	October 16, 1954	Los Angeles, CA	No. 3 UCLA	72	Stanford	0
26	October 15, 1955	Stanford, CA	No. 9 UCLA	21	Stanford	13
27	November 3, 1956	Los Angeles, CA	UCLA	14	No. 10 Stanford	13
28	October 26, 1957	Stanford, CA	Stanford	20	No. 15 UCLA	6
29	October 25, 1958	Los Angeles, CA	Stanford	21	UCLA	19
30	November 7, 1959	Stanford, CA	UCLA	55	Stanford	13
31	October 22, 1960	Los Angeles, CA	No. 19 UCLA	26	Stanford	8
32	October 28, 1961	Stanford, CA	UCLA	20	Stanford	0
33	October 27, 1962	Los Angeles, CA	Stanford	17	UCLA	7
34	October 5, 1963	Stanford, CA	UCLA	10	Stanford	9
35	October 3, 1964	Los Angeles, CA	UCLA	27	Stanford	20
36	November 13, 1965	Stanford, CA	No. 7 UCLA	30	Stanford	13
37	November 12, 1966	Los Angeles, CA	No. 8 UCLA	10	Stanford	0
38	October 21, 1967	Stanford, CA	No. 3 UCLA	21	Stanford	16
39	October 26, 1968	Los Angeles, CA	UCLA	20	Stanford	17
40	October 25, 1969	Stanford, CA	Tie	20	Tie	20
41	October 24, 1970	Los Angeles, CA	No. 8 Stanford	9	No. 16 UCLA	7
42	November 6, 1971	Stanford, CA	No. 12 Stanford	20	UCLA	9
43	November 4, 1972	Los Angeles, CA	No. 8 UCLA	28	Stanford	23
44	October 13, 1973	Stanford, CA	No. 15 UCLA	59	Stanford	13
45	October 12, 1974	Los Angeles, CA	Tie	13	Tie	13
46	October 11, 1975	Stanford, CA	UCLA	31	Stanford	21
47	October 9, 1976	Los Angeles, CA	No. 5 UCLA	38	Stanford	20
48	October 8, 1977	Stanford, CA	Stanford	32	UCLA	28

No.	Date	Location	Winning team		Losing team	
49	October 7, 1978	Los Angeles, CA	No. 16 UCLA	27	No. 17 Stanford	26
50	October 6, 1979	Stanford, CA	Stanford	27	UCLA	24
51	October 11, 1980	Los Angeles, CA	No. 5 UCLA	35	No. 16 Stanford	21
52	October 10, 1981	Stanford, CA	No. 17 Stanford	26	UCLA	23
53	November 13, 1982	Pasadena, CA	No. 12 UCLA	38	Stanford	35
54	October 8, 1983	Stanford, CA	UCLA	39	Stanford	21
55	October 6, 1984	Pasadena, CA	Stanford	23	No. 17 UCLA	21
56	October 12, 1985	Stanford, CA	UCLA	34	Stanford	9
57	November 8, 1986	Pasadena, CA	Stanford	28	No. 12 UCLA	23
58	October 3, 1987	Stanford, CA	No. 11 UCLA	49	Stanford	0
59	November 12, 1988	Pasadena, CA	No. 6 UCLA	27	Stanford	17
60	November 4, 1989	Stanford, CA	Stanford	17	UCLA	14
61	September 15, 1990	Pasadena, CA	UCLA	32	Stanford	31
62	November 9, 1991	Stanford, CA	Stanford	27	No. 22 UCLA	10
63	October 10, 1992	Pasadena, CA	No. 11 Stanford	19	No. 19 UCLA	7
64	September 25, 1993	Stanford, CA	UCLA	28	No. 17 Stanford	25
65	October 29, 1994	Pasadena, CA	UCLA	31	Stanford	30
66	October 21, 1995	Stanford, CA	UCLA	42	No. 23 Stanford	28
67	November 2, 1996	Pasadena, CA	Stanford	21	UCLA	20
68	November 1, 1997	Stanford, CA	No. 12 UCLA	27	Stanford	7
69	October 31, 1998	Pasadena, CA	No. 2 UCLA	28	Stanford	24
70	September 25, 1999	Stanford, CA	Stanford	42	No. 18 UCLA	32
71	November 4, 2000	Pasadena, CA	UCLA	37	Stanford	35
72	October 27, 2001	Stanford, CA	No. 20 Stanford	38	No. 4 UCLA	28
73	October 26, 2002	Pasadena, CA	UCLA	28	Stanford	18
74	November 1, 2003	Stanford, CA	Stanford	21	UCLA	14
75	October 30, 2004	Pasadena, CA	UCLA	21	Stanford	0
76	October 29, 2005	Stanford, CA	No. 8 UCLA	30	Stanford	27^{OT}
77	September 30, 2006	Pasadena, CA	UCLA	31	Stanford	24
78	September 1, 2007	Stanford, CA	No. 14 UCLA	45	Stanford	17
79	October 18, 2008	Pasadena, CA	UCLA	23	Stanford	20
80	October 3, 2009	Stanford, CA	Stanford	24	UCLA	16
81	September 11, 2010	Pasadena, CA	No. 25 Stanford	35	UCLA	0
82	October 1, 2011	Stanford, CA	No. 6 Stanford	45	UCLA	19
83	November 24, 2012	Pasadena, CA	No. 11 Stanford	35	No. 15 UCLA	17
84	November 30, 2012	Stanford, CA	No. 8 Stanford	27	No. 17 UCLA	24
85	October 19, 2013	Stanford, CA	No. 13 Stanford	24	No. 9 UCLA	10
86	November 28, 2014	Pasadena, CA	Stanford	31	No. 8 UCLA	10
87	October 15, 2015	Stanford, CA	No. 15 Stanford	56	No. 18 UCLA	35
88	September 24, 2016	Pasadena, CA	No. 7 Stanford	22	UCLA	13
89	September 23, 2017	Stanford, CA	Stanford	58	UCLA	34
90	November 24, 2018	Pasadena, CA	Stanford	49	UCLA	42
91	October 17, 2019	Stanford, CA	UCLA	34	Stanford	16
92	December 19, 2020	Pasadena, CA	Stanford	48	UCLA	47^{2OT}
93	September 25, 2021	Stanford, CA	No. 24 UCLA	35	Stanford	24
94	October 29, 2022	Pasadena, CA	No. 12 UCLA	38	Stanford	13
95	October 21, 2023	Stanford, CA	No. 25 UCLA	42	Stanford	7
Series: UCLA leads 49–43–3

Game results sources:

== See also ==
- List of NCAA college football rivalry games
