= 1992–93 NCAA football bowl games =

College football postseason game series

- Season: 1992
- Number of bowls: 18
- Bowl games: December 18, 1992 – January 1, 1993
- National Championship: 1993 Sugar Bowl
- Location of Championship: Louisiana Superdome, New Orleans, Louisiana
- Champions: Alabama Crimson Tide
Bowl record by conference
Conference	Bowls	Record	Number of teams in final AP poll
SEC	6	5–1 (0.833)	
Pac-10	6	2–4 (0.333)	
Big Eight	6	2–4 (0.333)	
WAC	5	2–3 (0.400)	
ACC	4	3–1 (0.750)	
Big Ten	3	1–2 (0.333)	
SWC	2	1–1 (0.500)	
Independents	2	1–1 (0.500)	
MAC	1	1–0 (1.000)	
Big West	1	0–1 (0.000)	

The 1992–93 NCAA football bowl games were a series of post-season games played in December 1992 and January 1993 to end the 1992 NCAA Division I-A football season. A total of 18 team-competitive games, and two all-star games, were played. The post-season began with the Las Vegas Bowl on December 18, 1992, and concluded on January 16, 1993, with the season-ending Senior Bowl.

== Schedule ==
Date	Game	Site	Time (US EST)	TV	Matchup (pre-game record)	AP pre-game rank	UPI (Coaches) pre-game rank
12/18	Las Vegas Bowl	Sam Boyd Stadium; Whitney, Nevada		ESPN	Bowling Green 35 (9–2) (MAC Champion), Nevada 34 (7–4) (Big West Champion)	NR; NR	NR; NR
12/25	Aloha Bowl	Aloha Stadium; Honolulu, Hawaii		ABC	Kansas 23 (7–4) (Big Eight), BYU 20 (8–4) (WAC co-Champion)	NR #25	NR #23
12/29	Freedom Bowl	Anaheim Stadium; Anaheim, California		Raycom	Fresno State 24 (8–4) (WAC co-Champion), USC 7 (6–4–1) (Pac-10)	NR #23	NR #25
12/29	Copper Bowl	Arizona Stadium; Tucson, Arizona		ESPN	Washington State 31 (8–3) (Pac-10), Utah 28 (6–5) (WAC)	#18; NR	#18; NR
12/30	Holiday Bowl	Jack Murphy Stadium; San Diego, California		ESPN	Hawaii 27 (10–2) (WAC co-Champion), Illinois 17 (6–4–1) (Big Ten)	NR; NR	#24; NR
12/31	John Hancock Bowl	Sun Bowl; El Paso, Texas		CBS	Baylor 20 (6–5) (SWC), Arizona 15 (6–4–1) (Pac-10)	NR #22	NR #22
12/31	Gator Bowl	Gator Bowl Stadium; Jacksonville, Florida		TBS	Florida 27 (8–4) (SEC), NC State 10 (9–2–1) (ACC)	#14 #12	#15 #12
12/31	Liberty Bowl	Liberty Bowl Memorial Stadium; Memphis, Tennessee		ESPN	Ole Miss 13 (8–3) (SEC), Air Force 0 (7–4) (WAC)	#20; NR	#19; NR
12/31	Independence Bowl	Independence Stadium; Shreveport, Louisiana		ESPN	Wake Forest 39 (7–4) (ACC), Oregon 35 (6–5) (Pac-10)	NR; NR	NR; NR
1/1	Florida Citrus Bowl	Florida Citrus Bowl; Orlando, Florida	12:00 PM	ABC	Georgia 21 (9–2) (SEC), Ohio State 14 (8–2–1) (Big Ten)	#8 #15	#8 #14
1/1	Hall of Fame Bowl	Tampa Stadium; Tampa, Florida		ESPN	Tennessee 38 (8–3) (SEC), Boston College 23 (8–2–1) (Big East)	#17 #16	#17 #16
1/1	Cotton Bowl Classic	Cotton Bowl; Dallas, Texas	1:30 PM	NBC	Notre Dame 28 (9–1–1) (Independent), Texas A&M 3 (12–0) (SWC Champion)	#5 #4	#5 #3
1/1	Blockbuster Bowl	Joe Robbie Stadium; Miami Gardens, Florida		CBS	Stanford 24 (9–3) (Pac-10), Penn State 3 (7–4) (Independent)	#13 #21	#13 #21
1/1	Fiesta Bowl	Sun Devil Stadium; Tempe, Arizona		NBC	Syracuse 26 (9–2) (Big East), Colorado 22 (9–1–1) (Big Eight)	#6 #10	#9 #6
1/1	Rose Bowl	Rose Bowl; Pasadena, California	4:30 PM	ABC	Michigan 38 (8–0–3) (Big Ten Champion), Washington 31 (9–2) (Pac-10 co-Champion)	#7 #9	#7 #11
1/1	Sugar Bowl	Louisiana Superdome; New Orleans, Louisiana	7:00 PM	ABC	Alabama 34 (12–0) (SEC Champion), Miami (FL) 13 (11–0) (Big East Champion)	#2 #1	#2 #1
1/1	Orange Bowl	Miami Orange Bowl; Miami	8:00 PM	NBC	Florida State 27 (10–1) (ACC Champion), Nebraska 14 (9–2) (Big Eight Champion)	#3 #11	#4 #10
1/2	Peach Bowl	Georgia Dome; Atlanta		ESPN	North Carolina 21 (8–3) (ACC), Mississippi State 17 (7–4) (SEC)	#24 #19	NR #20
