= 1992 New Mexico Lobos football team =

American college football season

1992 New Mexico Lobos football
- Conference: Western Athletic Conference
- Record: 3–8 (2–6 WAC)
- Head coach: Dennis Franchione (1st season)
- Offensive coordinator: Matt Simon (1st season)
- Offensive scheme: Multiple
- Defensive coordinator: Fred Bleil (1st season)
- Base defense: 4–3
- Home stadium: University Stadium

1992 Western Athletic Conference football standings
	Conf.					Overall
Team	W		L		T	W		L		T
No. 20 Hawaii +	6	–	2	–	0	11	–	2	–	0
No. 24 Fresno State +	6	–	2	–	0	9	–	4	–	0
BYU +	6	–	2	–	0	8	–	5	–	0
San Diego State	5	–	3	–	0	5	–	5	–	1
Air Force	4	–	4	–	0	7	–	5	–	0
Utah	4	–	4	–	0	6	–	6	–	0
Colorado State	3	–	5	–	0	5	–	7	–	0
Wyoming	3	–	5	–	0	5	–	7	–	0
New Mexico	2	–	6	–	0	3	–	8	–	0
UTEP	1	–	7	–	0	1	–	10	–	0
+ – Conference co-champions; Rankings from AP Poll

The 1992 New Mexico Lobos football team was an American football team that represented the University of New Mexico in the Western Athletic Conference (WAC) during the 1992 NCAA Division I-A football season. In their first season under head coach Dennis Franchione, the Lobos compiled a 3–8 record (2–6 against WAC opponents) and were outscored by a total of 287 to 247.

The team's statistical leaders included Stoney Case with 2,289 passing yards, Winslow Oliver with 1,063 rushing yards, Greg Oliver with 499 receiving yards, and kicker David Margolis with 55 points scored.

== Schedule ==
Date	Opponent	Site	Result	Attendance	Source
September 5	TCU*	University Stadium; Albuquerque, NM	W 24–7	24,751	
September 12	at New Mexico State*	Aggie Memorial Stadium; Las Cruces, NM (Rio Grande Rivalry)	L 39–42	27,646	
September 19	SMU*	University Stadium; Albuquerque, NM	L 13–20	21,660	
September 26	at Air Force	Falcon Stadium; Colorado Springs, CO	L 32–33	37,199	
October 3	San Diego State^{†}	University Stadium; Albuquerque, NM	L 21–49	23,186	
October 10	at Wyoming	War Memorial Stadium; Laramie, WY	L 21–35	18,653	
October 17	Utah	University Stadium; Albuquerque, NM	W 24–7	20,009	
October 24	at Fresno State	Bulldog Stadium; Fresno, CA	L 28–31	32,743	
November 7	at BYU	Cougar Stadium; Provo, UT	L 0–35	62,567	
November 14	UTEP	University Stadium; Albuquerque, NM	W 35–14	14,575	
November 21	Colorado State	University Stadium; Albuquerque, NM	L 10–14	11,221	
*Non-conference game; ^{†}Homecoming

== Roster ==
1992 New Mexico Lobos football team roster
Players
Coaches
Offense

Pos.	#	Name	Class
QB	25	Stoney Case	So
WR		Greg Oliver	Sr
RB		Winslow Oliver	Fr
TE	88	David Sloan	So
RB	4	Eric Young	So

Defense

Pos.	#	Name	Class
DT	73	John Lisker	So
LB	7	Todd Williams	So

Special teams

Pos.	#	Name	Class
K		David Margolis	Sr
P		Mike Nesbitt	Fr

Head coach

- Dennis Franchione

Coordinators/assistant coaches

- Matt Simon
  Offensive coordinator/Quarterbacks
- Fred Bleil
  Defensive coordinator

Legend

- (C) Team captain
- (S) Suspended
- (I) Ineligible
- Injured
- Redshirt
