= 1992 New Mexico State Aggies football team =

American college football season

1992 New Mexico State Aggies football
- Conference: Big West Conference
- Record: 6–5 (3–3 Big West)
- Head coach: Jim Hess (3rd season)
- Home stadium: Aggie Memorial Stadium

1992 Big West Conference football standings
	Conf.					Overall
Team	W		L		T	W		L		T
Nevada $	5	–	1	–	0	7	–	5	–	0
San Jose State	4	–	2	–	0	7	–	4	–	0
Utah State	4	–	2	–	0	5	–	6	–	0
New Mexico State	3	–	3	–	0	6	–	5	–	0
UNLV	3	–	3	–	0	6	–	5	–	0
Pacific (CA)	2	–	4	–	0	3	–	8	–	0
Cal State Fullerton	0	–	6	–	0	2	–	9	–	0
$ – Conference champion

The 1992 New Mexico State Aggies football team was an American football team that represented New Mexico State University in the Big West Conference during the 1992 NCAA Division I-A football season. In their third year under head coach Jim Hess, the Aggies compiled a 6–5 record. The team played its home games at Aggie Memorial Stadium in Las Cruces, New Mexico.

== Schedule ==
Date	Opponent	Site	Result	Attendance	Source
September 5	Weber State*	Aggie Memorial Stadium; Las Cruces, NM	W 37–21	14,216	
September 12	at New Mexico*	Aggie Memorial Stadium; Las Cruces, NM (rivalry)	W 42–39	27,646	
September 19	at UTEP*	Sun Bowl; El Paso, TX (rivalry)	W 30–24	38,911	
September 26	at Utah State	Romney Stadium; Logan, UT	L 21–48	14,482	
October 3	at Kansas State*	KSU Stadium; Manhattan, KS	L 0–19	33,310	
October 10	UNLV	Aggie Memorial Stadium; Las Cruces, NM	W 40–10	20,213	
October 17	Pacific (CA)	Aggie Memorial Stadium; Las Cruces, NM	L 17–49	23,928	
October 24	at Nevada	Mackay Stadium; Reno, NV	L 21–35	25,804	
October 31	at No. 17 Arizona*	Arizona Stadium; Tucson, AZ	L 0–30	38,463	
November 14	Cal State Fullerton	Aggie Memorial Stadium; Las Cruces, NM	W 44–31	12,821	
November 21	at San Jose State	Spartan Stadium; San Jose, CA	W 34–24	12,080	
*Non-conference game; Rankings from AP Poll released prior to the game
