= 1992 Wyoming Cowboys football team =

American college football season

1992 Wyoming Cowboys football
- Conference: Western Athletic Conference
- Record: 5–7 (3–5 WAC)
- Head coach: Joe Tiller (2nd season)
- Offensive coordinator: Larry Korpitz (2nd season)
- Defensive coordinator: Scott Downing (2nd season)
- Home stadium: War Memorial Stadium

1992 Western Athletic Conference football standings
	Conf.					Overall
Team	W		L		T	W		L		T
No. 20 Hawaii +	6	–	2	–	0	11	–	2	–	0
No. 24 Fresno State +	6	–	2	–	0	9	–	4	–	0
BYU +	6	–	2	–	0	8	–	5	–	0
San Diego State	5	–	3	–	0	5	–	5	–	1
Air Force	4	–	4	–	0	7	–	5	–	0
Utah	4	–	4	–	0	6	–	6	–	0
Colorado State	3	–	5	–	0	5	–	7	–	0
Wyoming	3	–	5	–	0	5	–	7	–	0
New Mexico	2	–	6	–	0	3	–	8	–	0
UTEP	1	–	7	–	0	1	–	10	–	0
+ – Conference co-champions; Rankings from AP Poll

The 1992 Wyoming Cowboys football team represented the University of Wyoming in the 1992 NCAA Division I-A football season. The Cowboys were led by second-year head coach Joe Tiller and played their home games at War Memorial Stadium in Laramie, Wyoming. They finished the season with a 5–7 record overall and a 3–5 record in the Western Athletic Conference to finish tied for seventh in the conference.

== Schedule ==
Date	Opponent	Site	Result	Attendance	Source
September 5	Nevada*	War Memorial Stadium; Laramie, WY	W 25–6	18,256	
September 12	at Texas Tech*	Jones Stadium; Lubbock, TX	L 32–49	34,940	
September 19	Air Force	War Memorial Stadium; Laramie, WY	L 28–42	22,665	
September 26	at Louisville*	Cardinal Stadium; Louisville, KY	W 26–24	28,463	
October 3	San Jose State*	War Memorial Stadium; Laramie, WY	L 24–26	15,543	
October 10	New Mexico	War Memorial Stadium; Laramie, WY	W 35–21	18,653	
October 17	BYU	War Memorial Stadium; Laramie, WY	L 28–31	21,709	
October 24	at Colorado State	Hughes Stadium; Fort Collins, CO \ (Border War)	W 31–14	22,071	
October 31	at Fresno State	Bulldog Stadium; Fresno, CA	L 31–42	31,088	
November 7	San Diego State	War Memorial Stadium; Laramie, WY	W 17–6	19,140	
November 14	at Utah	Robert Rice Stadium; Salt Lake City, UT	L 7–38	25,080	
November 21	at Hawaii	Aloha Stadium; Halawa, HI	L 18–42	39,604	
*Non-conference game; Source:

== Roster ==
1992 Wyoming Cowboys football team roster
Players			Coaches
Offense Brent Schieffer tight end: Pos. / # / Name / Class	Defense Brent Schieffer defensive_enf: Pos. / # / Name / Class	Special teams: Pos. / # / Name / Class	Head coach: Joe Tiller; Coordinators/assistant coaches: Kevin Sumlin – Wide receivers; Legend: (C) Team captain; (S) Suspended; (I) Ineligible; Injured; Redshirt
