= 1992 Cal State Fullerton Titans football team =

American college football season

1992 Cal State Fullerton Titans football
- Conference: Big West Conference
- Record: 2–9 (0–6 Big West)
- Head coach: Gene Murphy (13th season)
- Offensive coordinator: Jim Chaney (2nd season)
- Offensive scheme: Option
- Defensive coordinator: Kirk Harmon (5th season)
- Base defense: 4–3
- Home stadium: Titan Stadium

1992 Big West Conference football standings
	Conf.					Overall
Team	W		L		T	W		L		T
Nevada $	5	–	1	–	0	7	–	5	–	0
San Jose State	4	–	2	–	0	7	–	4	–	0
Utah State	4	–	2	–	0	5	–	6	–	0
New Mexico State	3	–	3	–	0	6	–	5	–	0
UNLV	3	–	3	–	0	6	–	5	–	0
Pacific (CA)	2	–	4	–	0	3	–	8	–	0
Cal State Fullerton	0	–	6	–	0	2	–	9	–	0
$ – Conference champion

The 1992 Cal State Fullerton Titans football team represented California State University, Fullerton as a member of the Big West Conference during the 1992 NCAA Division I-A football season. Led by 13th-year head coach Gene Murphy, Cal State Fullerton compiled an overall record of 2–9 with a mark of 0–6 in conference play, placing last out of sevens teams in the Big West. This was the third consecutive season that the team finished at the bottom of the Big West standings. Cal State Fullerton set an NCAA record for most fumbles in a season (71) and most fumbles lost in a season (41). The Titans played their home games at the new on-campus Titan Stadium in Fullerton, California.

Citing financial pressure, Cal State Fullerton dropped intercollegiate football after the 1992 season.

== Schedule ==
Date	Opponent	Site	Result	Attendance	Source
September 5	Cal State Northridge*	Titan Stadium; Fullerton, CA	W 28–7	8,279	
September 12	at UCLA*	Rose Bowl; Pasadena, CA	L 14–37	37,965	
September 19	at No. 19 Georgia*	Sanford Stadium; Athens, GA	L 0–56	75,515	
September 26	No. 12 (D-II) Sacramento State*	Titan Stadium; Fullerton, CA	L 3–29	4,154	
October 3	Nevada	Titan Stadium; Fullerton, CA	L 0–19	4,680	
October 10	at San Jose State	Spartan Stadium; San Jose, CA	L 3–49	13,407	
October 17	at Southwestern Louisiana*	Cajun Field; Lafayette, LA	W 14–10	15,137	
October 31	Utah State	Titan Stadium; Fullerton, CA	L 7–26	2,113	
November 7	at Pacific (CA)	Stagg Memorial Stadium; Stockton, CA	L 20–23	7,412	
November 14	at New Mexico State	Aggie Memorial Stadium; Las Cruces, NM	L 31–44	12,821	
November 28	at UNLV	Sam Boyd Silver Bowl; Whitney, NV	L 16–33	3,507	
*Non-conference game; Rankings from AP Poll released prior to the game
