= 1992 Copper Bowl =

- 4th Copper Bowl
Utah Utes	Washington State Cougars
(6–5)	(8–3)
WAC	Pac-10
28	31
Head coach: Ron McBride	Head coach: Mike Price
	AP / Coaches / BC; 18 / 18 / 18
	1	2	3	4	Total
Utah	0	14	14	0	28
Washington State	21	7	0	3	31
- Date: December 29, 1992
- Season: 1992
- Stadium: Arizona Stadium
- Location: Tucson, Arizona
- MVP: Drew Bledsoe (QB, WSU); Kareem Leary (DB, Utah)
- Favorite: Washington State by 8 points
- Referee: Steve Usechek (Big Eight)
- Attendance: 40,826

United States TV coverage
- Network: ESPN
- Announcers: Ron Franklin and Mike Gottfried

The 1992 Copper Bowl was sponsored by Weiser Lock and featured the unranked Utah Utes and the #18 Washington State Cougars, as part of the 1992–93 NCAA football bowl season. The fourth edition of the Copper Bowl, it was played on the night of Tuesday, December 29, at Arizona Stadium in Tucson, Arizona.

Washington State scored first on a 3-yard touchdown run by running back Shaumbe Wright-Fair, then junior quarterback Drew Bledsoe fired an 87-yard touchdown pass to wide receiver Phillip Bobo, increasing the lead to 14–0. Bledsoe would finish the game 30-for-46 passing for 476 yards. Wright-Fair scored on a 3-yard touchdown run for a 21–0 Cougar advantage at the end of the first quarter.

In the second quarter, Utah's Frank Dolce threw a 10-yard touchdown pass to Shaun Williams, and Keith Williams scored on a 25-yard touchdown run to make the score 21–14. Bledsoe found Bobo for a 48-yard touchdown pass as Washington State led 28–14 at halftime. In a planned move by WSU head coach Mike Price, Bledsoe was briefly replaced by backup Mike Pattinson in the second quarter.

In the third quarter, Dolce threw a 49-yard touchdown pass to Henry Lusk, and Pierre Jones' 8-yard touchdown run tied the game at 28. The only fourth quarter score was a field goal: Aaron Price, the son of the head coach, converted from 22 yards out with less than six minutes left and the favored Cougars escaped with a 31–28 victory, and climbed to fifteenth in the final rankings.

This was the final collegiate game for the 20-year-old Bledsoe; he was the first overall pick of the 1993 NFL draft.

== Statistics ==
Statistics	Utah	WSU
First downs	20	28
Rushes-yards	39-179	41-144
Passing yards	316	492
Passes, Comp-Att-Int	21-40-0	32-48-1
Return yards	27	(-2)
Punts-average	6-43	6-37
Fumbles-lost	3-1	4-2
Penalties-yards	7-55	18-136
Time of Possession	30:08	29:52
Attendance	40,876†	

† The official website lists game attendance as 40,826.
