= 1992 UTEP Miners football team =

American college football season

1992 UTEP Miners football
- Conference: Western Athletic Conference
- Record: 1–10 (1–7 WAC)
- Head coach: David Lee (4th season)
- Offensive coordinator: Johnnie Mac Hollinger (2nd season)
- Defensive coordinator: Mike Tolleson (1st season)
- Home stadium: Sun Bowl

1992 Western Athletic Conference football standings
	Conf.					Overall
Team	W		L		T	W		L		T
No. 20 Hawaii +	6	–	2	–	0	11	–	2	–	0
No. 24 Fresno State +	6	–	2	–	0	9	–	4	–	0
BYU +	6	–	2	–	0	8	–	5	–	0
San Diego State	5	–	3	–	0	5	–	5	–	1
Air Force	4	–	4	–	0	7	–	5	–	0
Utah	4	–	4	–	0	6	–	6	–	0
Colorado State	3	–	5	–	0	5	–	7	–	0
Wyoming	3	–	5	–	0	5	–	7	–	0
New Mexico	2	–	6	–	0	3	–	8	–	0
UTEP	1	–	7	–	0	1	–	10	–	0
+ – Conference co-champions; Rankings from AP Poll

The 1992 UTEP Miners football team was an American football team that represented the University of Texas at El Paso in the Western Athletic Conference during the 1992 NCAA Division I-A football season. In their fourth year under head coach David Lee, the team compiled a 1–10 record.

== Schedule ==
Date	Opponent	Site	Result	Attendance	Source
September 5	BYU	Sun Bowl; El Paso, TX	L 28–38	46,905	
September 12	at UNLV*	Sam Boyd Silver Bowl; Whitney, NV	L 17–19	15,176	
September 19	New Mexico State*	Sun Bowl; El Paso, TX (rivalry)	L 24–30	38,911	
October 3	Air Force^{†}	Sun Bowl; El Paso, TX	L 22–28	29,103	
October 10	at Colorado State	Hughes Stadium; Fort Collins, CO	L 24–42	15,407	
October 17	at San Diego State	Jack Murphy Stadium; San Diego, CA	L 27–49	46,449	
October 24	at Utah	Robert Rice Stadium; Salt Lake City, UT	W 20–13	27,802	
October 31	Hawaii	Sun Bowl; El Paso, TX	L 21–41	20,734	
November 7	at Tulsa*	Skelly Stadium; Tulsa, OK	L 39–48	19,624	
November 14	at New Mexico	University Stadium; Albuquerque, NM	L 14–35	14,575	
November 28	Fresno State	Sun Bowl; El Paso, TX	L 18–43	15,000	
*Non-conference game; ^{†}Homecoming
