= 1992 Pacific Tigers football team =

American college football season

1992 Pacific Tigers football
- Conference: Big West Conference
- Record: 3–8 (2–4 Big West)
- Head coach: Chuck Shelton (1st season)
- Offensive coordinator: Bill Bleil (1st season)
- Offensive scheme: Spread
- Co-defensive coordinators: Steve Caldwell (1st season); Don Dunn (1st season)
- Base defense: 4–3
- Home stadium: Stagg Memorial Stadium

1992 Big West Conference football standings
| | Conf. | | | | | Overall |
| Team | W | | L | | T | W | | L | | T |
|---|---|---|---|---|---|---|---|---|---|---|
| Nevada $ | 5 | – | 1 | – | 0 | 7 | – | 5 | – | 0 |
| San Jose State | 4 | – | 2 | – | 0 | 7 | – | 4 | – | 0 |
| Utah State | 4 | – | 2 | – | 0 | 5 | – | 6 | – | 0 |
| New Mexico State | 3 | – | 3 | – | 0 | 6 | – | 5 | – | 0 |
| UNLV | 3 | – | 3 | – | 0 | 6 | – | 5 | – | 0 |
| Pacific (CA) | 2 | – | 4 | – | 0 | 3 | – | 8 | – | 0 |
| Cal State Fullerton | 0 | – | 6 | – | 0 | 2 | – | 9 | – | 0 |
$ – Conference champion

The 1992 Pacific Tigers football team represented the University of the Pacific (UOP) in the 1992 NCAA Division I-A football season as a member of the Big West Conference.

The team was led by head coach Chuck Shelton, in his first year, and played home games at Stagg Memorial Stadium in Stockton, California. They finished the season with a record of three wins and eight losses (3–8, 2–4 Big West). The Tigers were outscored by their opponents 253–287 over the season.

== Schedule ==
| Date | Opponent | Site | Result | Attendance | Source |
|---|---|---|---|---|---|
| September 5 | Fresno State* | Stagg Memorial Stadium; Stockton, CA | L 21–42 | 16,323 | |
| September 12 | at Nevada* | Mackay Stadium; Reno, NV | L 14–20 | 24,111 | |
| September 19 | at Boise State* | Bronco Stadium; Boise, ID | L 7–17 | 17,132 | |
| September 26 | No. 11 Southwest Missouri State* | Stagg Memorial Stadium; Stockton, CA | W 48–14 | | |
| October 3 | UNLV^{†} | Stagg Memorial Stadium; Stockton, CA | L 17–21 | 12,452 | |
| October 10 | at Arizona State* | Sun Devil Stadium; Tempe, AZ | L 5–39 | 40,317 | |
| October 17 | at New Mexico State | Aggie Memorial Stadium; Las Cruces, NM | W 49–17 | 23,928 | |
| October 24 | at No. 1 Washington | Husky Stadium; Seattle, WA | L 7–31 | 70,618 | |
| November 7 | Cal State Fullerton* | Stagg Memorial Stadium; Stockton, CA | W 23–20 | 7,412 | |
| November 14 | San Jose State | Stagg Memorial Stadium; Stockton, CA (Victory Bell) | L 27–28 | 8,114 | |
| November 21 | Utah State | Stagg Memorial Stadium; Stockton, CA | L 35–38 | 6,189 | |
*Non-conference game; ^{†}Homecoming; Rankings from AP Poll released prior to the game; Source:

== Team players in the NFL ==
The following UOP players were selected in the 1993 NFL draft.

| Player | Position | Round | Overall | NFL team |
| Greg Bishop | Guard, tackle | 4 | 93 | New York Giants |

The following finished their college career in 1992, were not drafted, but played in the NFL.

| Player | Position | First NFL team |
| Ryan Benjamin | Running back | 1993 Cincinnati Bengals |
| Daryl Hobbs | Wide receiver | 1993 Los Angeles Raiders |
| Shawn Price | Defensive end, defensive tackle | 1993 Tampa Bay Buccaneers |
