= 1992 San Jose State Spartans football team =

American college football season

1992 San Jose State Spartans football
- Conference: Big West Conference
- Record: 7–4 (4–2 Big West)
- Head coach: Ron Turner (1st season)
- Home stadium: Spartan Stadium

1992 Big West Conference football standings
	Conf.					Overall
Team	W		L		T	W		L		T
Nevada $	5	–	1	–	0	7	–	5	–	0
San Jose State	4	–	2	–	0	7	–	4	–	0
Utah State	4	–	2	–	0	5	–	6	–	0
New Mexico State	3	–	3	–	0	6	–	5	–	0
UNLV	3	–	3	–	0	6	–	5	–	0
Pacific (CA)	2	–	4	–	0	3	–	8	–	0
Cal State Fullerton	0	–	6	–	0	2	–	9	–	0
$ – Conference champion

The 1992 San Jose State Spartans football team represented San Jose State University during the 1992 NCAA Division I-A football season as a member of the Big West Conference. The team was led by head coach Ron Turner, in his only year as head coach at San Jose State. They played home games at Spartan Stadium in San Jose, California. The Spartans finished the 1992 season with a record of seven wins and four losses (7–4, 4–2 Big West).

== Schedule ==
Date	Opponent	Site	Result	Attendance	Source
September 5	at No. 19 California*	California Memorial Stadium; Berkeley, CA	L 16–46	56,000	
September 12	at Minnesota*	Hubert H. Humphrey Metrodome; Minneapolis, MN	W 39–30	36,912	
September 19	Southwestern Louisiana*	Spartan Stadium; San Jose, CA	W 38–13	14,322	
September 26	at No. 19 Stanford*	Stanford Stadium; Stanford, CA (rivalry)	L 13–37	56,423	
October 3	at Wyoming*	War Memorial Stadium; Laramie, WY	W 26–24	15,543	
October 10	Cal State Fullerton^{†}	Spartan Stadium; San Jose, CA	W 49–3	13,407	
October 24	at Utah State	Romney Stadium; Logan, UT	W 27–25	18,185	
October 31	at UNLV	Sam Boyd Silver Bowl; Whitney, NV	L 31–35	9,372	
November 7	Nevada	Spartan Stadium; San Jose, CA	W 39–35	15,323	
November 14	at Pacific (CA)	Stagg Memorial Stadium; Stockton, CA (Victory Bell)	W 28–27	8,114	
November 21	New Mexico State	Spartan Stadium; San Jose, CA	L 24–34	12,080	
*Non-conference game; ^{†}Homecoming; Rankings from AP Poll released prior to the game; Source:
