= 1992 Colorado State Rams football team =

American college football season

1992 Colorado State Rams football
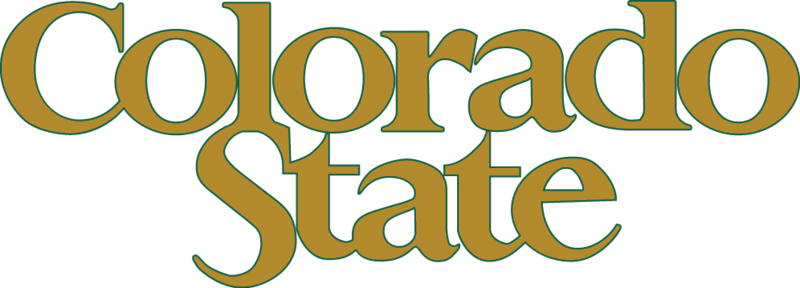
- Conference: Western Athletic Conference
- Record: 5–7 (3–5 WAC)
- Head coach: Earle Bruce (4th season)
- Defensive coordinator: Chuck Heater (2nd season)
- Home stadium: Hughes Stadium

1992 Western Athletic Conference football standings
	Conf.					Overall
Team	W		L		T	W		L		T
No. 20 Hawaii +	6	–	2	–	0	11	–	2	–	0
No. 24 Fresno State +	6	–	2	–	0	9	–	4	–	0
BYU +	6	–	2	–	0	8	–	5	–	0
San Diego State	5	–	3	–	0	5	–	5	–	1
Air Force	4	–	4	–	0	7	–	5	–	0
Utah	4	–	4	–	0	6	–	6	–	0
Colorado State	3	–	5	–	0	5	–	7	–	0
Wyoming	3	–	5	–	0	5	–	7	–	0
New Mexico	2	–	6	–	0	3	–	8	–	0
UTEP	1	–	7	–	0	1	–	10	–	0
+ – Conference co-champions; Rankings from AP Poll

The 1992 Colorado State Rams football team represented Colorado State University in the Western Athletic Conference during the 1992 NCAA Division I-A football season. In fourth second season under head coach Earle Bruce, the Rams compiled a 5–7 record.

== Schedule ==
Date	Opponent	Site	TV	Result	Attendance	Source
September 5	at No. 12 Colorado*	Folsom Field; Boulder, CO (rivalry)		L 17–37	52,164	
September 12	No. 9 (I-AA) Idaho*	Hughes Stadium; Fort Collins, CO		L 34–37	18,573	
September 19	at Fresno State	Bulldog Stadium; Fresno, CA		L 21–52	37,955	
September 26	at LSU*	Tiger Stadium; Baton Rouge, LA	PPV	W 17–14	68,654	
October 3	Utah	Hughes Stadium; Fort Collins, CO		L 29–33	25,307	
October 10	UTEP	Hughes Stadium; Fort Collins, CO		W 42–24	15,407	
October 17	at Air Force	Falcon Stadium; Colorado Springs, CO (rivalry)		W 32–28	40,808	
October 24	Wyoming	Hughes Stadium; Fort Collins, CO (rivalry)		L 14–31	22,071	
October 31	San Diego State	Hughes Stadium; Fort Collins, CO		L 13–20	16,310	
November 7	at Hawaii	Aloha Stadium; Halawa, HI		L 13–24	43,458	
November 14	Ohio*	Hughes Stadium; Fort Collins, CO		W 35–24	15,590	
November 21	at New Mexico	University Stadium; Albuquerque, NM		W 14–10	11,221	
*Non-conference game; Rankings from AP Poll released prior to the game
