= 1992 Air Force Falcons football team =

American college football season

1992 Air Force Falcons football
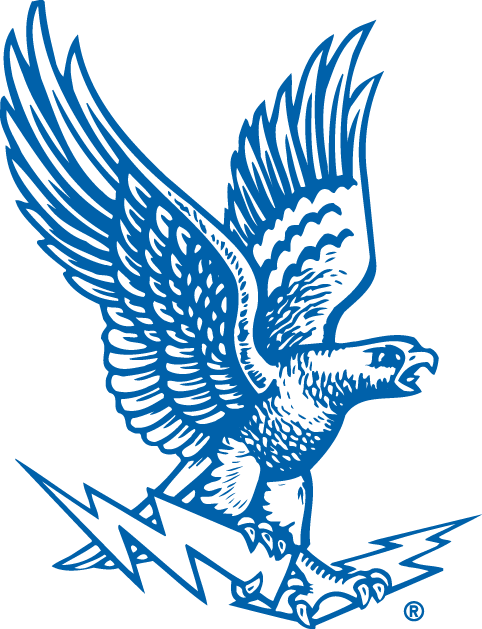

Liberty Bowl champion

Liberty Bowl, L 0–13 vs. Ole Miss
- Conference: Western Athletic Conference
- Record: 7–5 (4–4 WAC)
- Head coach: Fisher DeBerry (9th season)
- Offensive coordinator: Paul Hamilton (3rd season)
- Offensive scheme: Wishbone triple option
- Defensive coordinator: Cal McCombs (3rd season)
- Base defense: 3–4
- Captains: Chris Baker; Jarvis Baker; Carlton McDonald
- Home stadium: Falcon Stadium

1992 Western Athletic Conference football standings
	Conf.					Overall
Team	W		L		T	W		L		T
No. 20 Hawaii +	6	–	2	–	0	11	–	2	–	0
No. 24 Fresno State +	6	–	2	–	0	9	–	4	–	0
BYU +	6	–	2	–	0	8	–	5	–	0
San Diego State	5	–	3	–	0	5	–	5	–	1
Air Force	4	–	4	–	0	7	–	5	–	0
Utah	4	–	4	–	0	6	–	6	–	0
Colorado State	3	–	5	–	0	5	–	7	–	0
Wyoming	3	–	5	–	0	5	–	7	–	0
New Mexico	2	–	6	–	0	3	–	8	–	0
UTEP	1	–	7	–	0	1	–	10	–	0
+ – Conference co-champions; Rankings from AP Poll

The 1992 Air Force Falcons football team represented the United States Air Force Academy as a member of the Western Athletic Conference (WAC) during the 1992 NCAA Division I-A football season. Led by ninth-year head coach Fisher DeBerry, the Falcons compiled an overall record of 7–5 with a mark of 4–4 in conference play, tying for fifth place in the WAC. Air Force was invited to the Liberty Bowl, where the Falcons lost to Ole Miss. The team played home games at Falcon Stadium in Colorado Springs, Colorado

== Schedule ==
Date	Opponent	Site	TV	Result	Attendance	Source
September 5	Rice*	Falcon Stadium; Colorado Springs, CO		W 30–21	43,121	
September 12	Hawaii	Falcon Stadium; Colorado Springs, CO (rivalry)		L 3–6	39,269	
September 19	at Wyoming	War Memorial Stadium; Laramie, WY		W 42–28	22,665	
September 26	New Mexico	Falcon Stadium; Colorado Springs, CO		W 33–32	37,199	
October 3	at UTEP	Sun Bowl; El Paso, TX		W 28–22	29,103	
October 10	Navy*	Falcon Stadium; Colorado Springs, CO (Commander-in-Chief's Trophy)		W 18–16	47,687	
October 17	Colorado State	Falcon Stadium; Colorado Springs, CO (rivalry)		L 28–32	40,808	
October 24	at San Diego State	Jack Murphy Stadium; San Diego, CA	ESPN	W 20–17	36,892	
October 31	Utah	Falcon Stadium; Colorado Springs, CO	KUTV	L 13–20	36,872	
November 7	at Army*	Michie Stadium; West Point, NY (Commander-in-Chief's Trophy)		W 7–3	40,675	
November 14	BYU	Falcon Stadium; Colorado Springs, CO	KSL	L 7–28	37,113	
December 31	vs. No. 20 Ole Miss*	Liberty Bowl Memorial Stadium; Memphis, TN (Liberty Bowl)	ESPN	L 0–13	32,107	
*Non-conference game; Rankings from AP Poll released prior to the game

== Game summaries ==
=== Navy ===
Chris McInnis kicked game-winning 37-yard field goal with 49 seconds left for the win.

== Roster ==
1992 Air Force Falcons football team roster
Players
Coaches
Offense

Pos.	#	Name	Class

Defense

Pos.	#	Name	Class
CB		Carlton McDonald	Sr
LB		Vergil Simpson	Sr

Special teams

Pos.	#	Name	Class
K		Chris McInnis

Head coach

- Fisher DeBerry

Coordinators/assistant coaches

Legend

- (C) Team captain
- (S) Suspended
- (I) Ineligible
- Injured
- Redshirt
