= Chris Maumalanga =

American football player (born 1971)

No. 99, 97, 91, 87, 78
- Position: Defensive tackle

Personal information
- Born: December 15, 1971 (age 54); Redwood City, California, U.S.
- Listed height: 6 ft 2 in (1.88 m)
- Listed weight: 288 lb (131 kg)

Career information
- High school: Bishop Montgomery (Torrance, California)
- College: Kansas
- NFL draft: 1994: 4th round, 128th overall pick

Career history
- New York Giants (1994); Arizona Cardinals (1995–1996); Kansas City Chiefs (1997)*; Chicago Bears (1997); St. Louis Rams (1997); Cleveland Browns (1999)*; Oakland Raiders (2000)*; Buffalo Destroyers (2000); Houston ThunderBears (2000); New York/New Jersey Hitmen (2001)
- * Offseason or practice squad member only

Awards and highlights
- First-team All-Big Eight (1993); Second-team All-Big Eight (1992)

Career NFL statistics
- Total tackles: 8
- Forced fumbles: 1
- Stats at Pro Football Reference
- Stats at ArenaFan.com

Christian Netane Maumalanga (born December 15, 1971) is an American former professional football player who was a defensive tackle in the National Football League (NFL). He played college football for the Kansas Jayhawks. He was selected by the New York Giants in the fourth round of the 1994 NFL draft.

== Early life ==
Maumalanga was born in Redwood City, California, and attended Bishop Montgomery High School where he was named All-State in both football and track.

== College career ==
Maumalanga attended Kansas where he was a four-year letter winner while majoring in business. As a sophomore, he recorded the first safety in Aloha Bowl history during the Jayhawks win over BYU. As a senior, he recorded 74 tackles and 7.5 sacks. He was also named first-team All-Conference and honorable mention All-American as a senior. He finished his senior season by winning the 1994 Hula Bowl defensive MVP award.

== Professional career ==
Maumalanga was selected in the fourth round (128th overall) by the New York Giants. On July 25, 1994, during training camp Maumalanga got into a fight with offensive lineman Greg Bishop. Maumalanga bloodied Bishop after cutting him open with a one-and-a-half-inch gash from his forehead to his nose, which required five stitches to close. Later in 1994, Maumalanga was involved in a locker room fight with Michael Strahan. Strahan dodged Maumalanga's initial punch and locked Maumalanga in a rear naked choke hold and held him there until the fight was broken up by teammates.

As a rookie, replacing an injured Coleman Rudolph, Maumalanga recorded five tackles against the Dallas Cowboys. He finished the season with seven total tackles, one forced fumble and one pass defensed.

In 1995 with the Arizona Cardinals he played in six games recording one tackle. In 1996, he played in one game.

In 1997, he spent time with the Kansas City Chiefs, St. Louis Rams and Chicago Bears. In 1999, he spent time with the Cleveland Browns. In 2000, also spent time on the off-season roster of the Oakland Raiders.

In 2000, he also played in the Arena Football League as an offensive lineman as well as a defensive lineman for both the Buffalo Destroyers and Houston ThunderBears. In his lone AFL season, he recorded eight tackles, one sack and two pass break-ups. In 2001, he played for the New York/New Jersey Hitmen. For the league's lone season, he recorded 37 total tackles and four sacks.

== Coaching career ==
Maumalanga also coached at Cathedral High School in Los Angeles.

== Personal life ==
Growing up, Maumalanga was a member of a street gang. In June, 1995 during training camp, he knocked out linebacker, Mitch Davis, and had to be pulled off of him by two fellow linebackers, Pete Shufelt and Jessie Armstead. Not long after, Maumalanga got into a fight with future Hall of Fame defensive end Michael Strahan.

He has four children, Olivia, Matthew, Christian and Ana Elizabeth.

His cousin, Stephen Paea, was a second-round pick by the Chicago Bears as a defensive tackle and played seven seasons with the NFL. His nephew, Jay Toia, plays in the NFL for the Dallas Cowboys.

Maumalanga founded the Tongan American Youth Foundation. He also coaches at Football University.
