= 1992 Utah Utes football team =

American college football season

1992 Utah Utes football

Copper Bowl, L 28–31 vs. Washington State
- Conference: Western Athletic Conference
- Record: 6–6 (4–4 WAC)
- Head coach: Ron McBride (3rd season)
- Offensive coordinator: Rick Rasnick (2nd season)
- Offensive scheme: Multiple
- Defensive coordinator: Fred Whittingham (1st season)
- Base defense: 4–3
- Home stadium: Robert Rice Stadium

1992 Western Athletic Conference football standings
	Conf.					Overall
Team	W		L		T	W		L		T
No. 20 Hawaii +	6	–	2	–	0	11	–	2	–	0
No. 24 Fresno State +	6	–	2	–	0	9	–	4	–	0
BYU +	6	–	2	–	0	8	–	5	–	0
San Diego State	5	–	3	–	0	5	–	5	–	1
Air Force	4	–	4	–	0	7	–	5	–	0
Utah	4	–	4	–	0	6	–	6	–	0
Colorado State	3	–	5	–	0	5	–	7	–	0
Wyoming	3	–	5	–	0	5	–	7	–	0
New Mexico	2	–	6	–	0	3	–	8	–	0
UTEP	1	–	7	–	0	1	–	10	–	0
+ – Conference co-champions; Rankings from AP Poll

The 1992 Utah Utes football team represented the University of Utah as a member of the Western Athletic Conference (WAC) during the 1992 NCAA Division I-A football season. In their third season under head coach Ron McBride, the Utes compiled an overall record of 6–6 record with a mark of 4–4 against conference opponents, tied for fifth place in the WAC, and outscored their opponents 320 to 289. Utah was invited to the Copper Bowl, where they lost to the Washington State. It was the program first appearance in a bowl game since the 1964 season. The team played home games at Robert Rice Stadium in Salt Lake City.

== Schedule ==
Date	Time	Opponent	Site	TV	Result	Attendance	Source
September 5	12:00 pm	at No. 11 Nebraska*	Memorial Stadium; Lincoln, NE	KUTV	L 22–49	76,234	
September 12	1:00 pm	at Utah State*	Romney Stadium; Logan, UT (Battle of the Brothers)		W 42–18	18,177	
September 26	7:00 pm	Oregon State*	Rice Stadium; Salt Lake City, UT		W 42–9	32,298	
October 3	12:05 pm	at Colorado State	Hughes Stadium; Fort Collins, CO		W 33–29	25,307	
October 10	12:00 pm	Hawaii	Robert Rice Stadium; Salt Lake City, UT		W 38–17	30,506	
October 17	2:00 pm	at New Mexico	University Stadium; Albuquerque, NM		L 7–24	20,009	
October 24	12:00 pm	UTEP^{†}	Robert Rice Stadium; Salt Lake City, UT		L 13–20	27,802	
October 31	12:00 pm	at Air Force	Falcon Stadium; Colorado Springs, CO	KUTV	W 20–13	36,872	
November 7	7:00 pm	at Fresno State	Bulldog Stadium; Fresno, CA	KUTV	L 15–41	37,555	
November 14	12:00 pm	Wyoming	Robert Rice Stadium; Salt Lake City, UT		W 38–7	25,080	
November 21	12:00 pm	BYU	Robert Rice Stadium; Salt Lake City, UT (Holy War)	KSL	L 22–31	33,348	
December 29	5:30 pm	vs. No. 18 Washington State*	Arizona Stadium; Tucson, AZ (Copper Bowl)	ESPN	L 28–31	40,876	
*Non-conference game; ^{†}Homecoming; Rankings from AP Poll released prior to the game; All times are in Mountain time

== Roster ==
1992 Utah Utes football team roster
Players
Coaches
Offense

Pos.	#	Name	Class
RB	32	Jamal Anderson	Jr
OT	74	Anthony Brown	So
TE	82	Kurt Haws	Jr
WR	21	Curtis Marsh	So
QB	14	Mike McCoy	So
C	56	Lance Scott	So

Defense

Pos.	#	Name	Class
LB	42	Ken Buss	So
LB	48	Preston Christensen	Sr
DT	83	Luther Elliss	So

Special teams

Pos.	#	Name	Class
K	11	Chris Yergensen	Jr

Head coach

- Ron McBride

Coordinators/assistant coaches

Legend

- (C) Team captain
- (S) Suspended
- (I) Ineligible
- Injured
- Redshirt
