= 1992 UNLV Rebels football team =

American college football season

1992 UNLV Rebels football
- Conference: Big West Conference
- Record: 6–5 (3–3 Big West)
- Head coach: Jim Strong (3rd season)
- Defensive coordinator: Dave Wommack (1st season)
- Home stadium: Sam Boyd Silver Bowl

1992 Big West Conference football standings
	Conf.					Overall
Team	W		L		T	W		L		T
Nevada $	5	–	1	–	0	7	–	5	–	0
San Jose State	4	–	2	–	0	7	–	4	–	0
Utah State	4	–	2	–	0	5	–	6	–	0
New Mexico State	3	–	3	–	0	6	–	5	–	0
UNLV	3	–	3	–	0	6	–	5	–	0
Pacific (CA)	2	–	4	–	0	3	–	8	–	0
Cal State Fullerton	0	–	6	–	0	2	–	9	–	0
$ – Conference champion

The 1992 UNLV Rebels football team was an American football team that represented the University of Nevada, Las Vegas (UNLV) as a member of the Big West Conference during the 1992 NCAA Division I-A football season. In their third year under head coach Jim Strong, the Rebels compiled an overall record of 6–5 with a mark of 3–3 in conference play, tying for fourth place in the Big West. The team played home games at the Sam Boyd Silver Bowl in Whitney, Nevada.

== Schedule ==
Date	Opponent	Site	Result	Attendance	Source
September 12	UTEP*	Sam Boyd Silver Bowl; Whitney, NV	W 19–17	15,176	
September 19	Northern Arizona*	Sam Boyd Silver Bowl; Whitney, NV	W 40–7	15,584	
September 26	at Oregon*	Autzen Stadium; Eugene, OR	L 6–59	29,508	
October 3	at Pacific (CA)	Stagg Memorial Stadium; Stockton, CA	W 21–17	12,452	
October 10	at New Mexico State	Aggie Memorial Stadium; Las Cruces, NM	L 10–40	20,213	
October 17	Nevada	Sam Boyd Silver Bowl; Whitney, NV (Fremont Cannon)	L 10–14	25,409	
October 24	at Hawaii*	Aloha Stadium; Halawa, HI	L 25–55	38,918	
October 31	San Jose State	Sam Boyd Silver Bowl; Whitney, NV	W 35–31	9,372	
November 7	at Utah State	Romney Stadium; Logan, UT	L 8–48	10,280	
November 21	Montana State*	Sam Boyd Silver Bowl; Whitney, NV	W 36–7	9,444	
November 28	Cal State Fullerton	Sam Boyd Silver Bowl; Whitney, NV	W 33–16	3,507	
*Non-conference game; Source:
