= 1992 California Golden Bears football team =

American college football season

1992 California Golden Bears football
- Conference: Pacific-10 Conference
- Record: 4–7 (2–6 Pac-10)
- Head coach: Keith Gilbertson (1st season)
- Offensive coordinator: Mike Sheppard (1st season)
- Defensive coordinator: Artie Gigantino (1st season)
- Home stadium: California Memorial Stadium

1992 Pacific-10 Conference football standings
	Conf.					Overall
Team	W		L		T	W		L		T
No. 11 Washington +	6	–	2	–	0	9	–	3	–	0
No. 9 Stanford +	6	–	2	–	0	10	–	3	–	0
No. 15 Washington State	5	–	3	–	0	9	–	3	–	0
USC	5	–	3	–	0	6	–	5	–	1
Arizona	4	–	3	–	1	6	–	5	–	1
Arizona State	4	–	4	–	0	6	–	5	–	0
Oregon	4	–	4	–	0	6	–	6	–	0
UCLA	3	–	5	–	0	6	–	5	–	0
California	2	–	6	–	0	4	–	7	–	0
Oregon State	0	–	7	–	1	1	–	9	–	1
+ – Conference co-champions; Rankings from AP Poll

The 1992 California Golden Bears football team was an American football team that represented the University of California, Berkeley as a member of the Pacific-10 Conference (Pac-10) during the 1992 NCAA Division I-A football season. In their first year under head coach Keith Gilbertson, the Golden Bears compiled an overall record of 4–7 record with a mark of 2–6 against conference opponents, placing ninth place in the Pac-10. California scored 284 points and allowed 284 points. The team played home games at California Memorial Stadium in Berkeley, California.

The team's statistical leaders included Dave Barr with 2,343 passing yards, Russell White with 1,069 rushing yards, and Sean Dawkins with 1,070 receiving yards.

== Schedule ==
Date	Opponent	Rank	Site	TV	Result	Attendance	Source
September 5	San Jose State*	No. 19	California Memorial Stadium; Berkeley, CA		W 46–16	56,000	
September 12	at Purdue*	No. 17	Ross–Ade Stadium; West Lafayette, IN		L 14–41	44,727	
September 24	at No. 24 Kansas*		Memorial Stadium; Lawrence, KS	ESPN	W 27–23	44,500	
October 3	Oregon State		California Memorial Stadium; Berkeley, CA		W 42–0	46,500	
October 10	at No. 1 Washington	No. 24	Husky Stadium; Seattle, WA	ABC	L 16–35	73,504	
October 17	at No. 18 USC		Los Angeles Memorial Coliseum; Los Angeles, CA	ABC	L 24–27	54,476	
October 24	No. 21 Arizona		California Memorial Stadium; Berkeley, CA		L 17–24	46,000	
October 31	UCLA		California Memorial Stadium; Berkeley, CA (rivalry)		W 48–12	56,000	
November 7	at Oregon		Autzen Stadium; Eugene, OR		L 17–37	34,651	
November 14	at Arizona State		Sun Devil Stadium; Tempe, AZ		L 12–28	48,723	
November 21	No. 13 Stanford		California Memorial Stadium; Berkeley, CA (Big Game)		L 21–41	75,662	
*Non-conference game; Rankings from AP Poll released prior to the game; Source:

== Roster ==
1992 California Golden Bears football team roster
Players
Coaches
Offense

Pos.	#	Name	Class
WR	86	Sean Dawkins	Jr
OT	75	Todd Steussie	Jr
RB	4	Russell White	Sr

Defense

Pos.	#	Name	Class
DE	72	Chidi Ahanotu	Sr

Special teams

Pos.	#	Name	Class
K	10	Doug Brien	Jr

Head coach

- Keith Gilbertson

Coordinators/assistant coaches

Legend

- (C) Team captain
- (S) Suspended
- (I) Ineligible
- Injured
- Redshirt
