= 1992 Fresno State Bulldogs football team =

American college football season

1992 Fresno State Bulldogs football
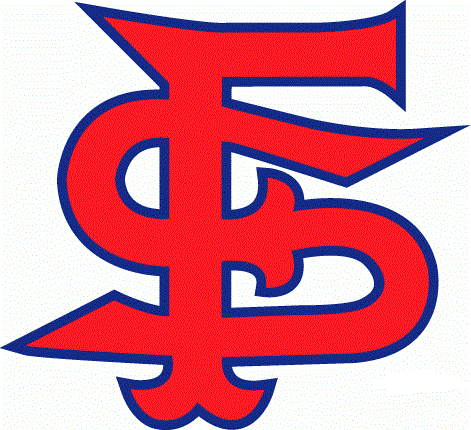

WAC co-champion Freedom Bowl champion

Freedom Bowl, W 24–7 vs. USC
- Conference: Western Athletic Conference

Ranking
- Coaches: No. 22
- AP: No. 24
- Record: 9–4 (6–2 WAC)
- Head coach: Jim Sweeney (15th season)
- Home stadium: Bulldog Stadium

1992 Western Athletic Conference football standings
	Conf.					Overall
Team	W		L		T	W		L		T
No. 20 Hawaii +	6	–	2	–	0	11	–	2	–	0
No. 24 Fresno State +	6	–	2	–	0	9	–	4	–	0
BYU +	6	–	2	–	0	8	–	5	–	0
San Diego State	5	–	3	–	0	5	–	5	–	1
Air Force	4	–	4	–	0	7	–	5	–	0
Utah	4	–	4	–	0	6	–	6	–	0
Colorado State	3	–	5	–	0	5	–	7	–	0
Wyoming	3	–	5	–	0	5	–	7	–	0
New Mexico	2	–	6	–	0	3	–	8	–	0
UTEP	1	–	7	–	0	1	–	10	–	0
+ – Conference co-champions; Rankings from AP Poll

The 1992 Fresno State Bulldogs football team represented California State University, Fresno, as a member of the Western Athletic Conference (WAC) during the 1992 NCAA Division I-A football season. This was the team's first year in the WAC, after spending the previous 23 seasons in the Big West Conference. Led by 15th-year head coach Jim Sweeney, Fresno State compiled an overall record of 9–4 with a mark of 6–2 in conference play, sharing the WAC title with BYU and Hawaii. The Bulldogs played their home games at Bulldog Stadium in Fresno, California.

Fresno State was invited to the Freedom Bowl, where they beat USC, 24–7. The Bulldogs finished the season ranked No. 24 in the AP Poll and No. 22 in the Coaches Poll.

== Schedule ==
Date	Opponent	Site	TV	Result	Attendance	Source
September 5	at Pacific (CA)*	Stagg Memorial Stadium; Stockton, CA		W 42–21	16,323	
September 12	at Oregon State*	Parker Stadium; Corvallis, OR		L 36–46	22,326	
September 19	Colorado State	Bulldog Stadium; Fresno, CA		W 52–21	37,955	
September 26	Washington State*	Bulldog Stadium; Fresno, CA	PSN	L 37–39	38,077	
October 3	Louisiana Tech*	Bulldog Stadium; Fresno, CA		W 48–14	33,934	
October 10	at BYU	Cougar Stadium; Provo, UT		L 24–36	65,396	
October 17	at Hawaii	Aloha Stadium; Halawa, HI (rivalry)		L 45–47	44,175	
October 24	New Mexico	Bulldog Stadium; Fresno, CA		W 31–28	32,743	
October 31	Wyoming	Bulldog Stadium; Fresno, CA		W 42–31	31,088	
November 7	Utah	Bulldog Stadium; Fresno, CA		W 41–15	37,555	
November 21	at San Diego State	Jack Murphy Stadium; San Diego, CA (rivalry)		W 45–41	41,523	
November 28	at UTEP	Sun Bowl; El Paso, TX		W 43–18	15,000	
December 29	vs. No. 23 USC*	Anaheim Stadium; Anaheim, CA (Freedom Bowl)	Raycom	W 24–7	50,745	
*Non-conference game; Rankings from AP Poll released prior to the game

== Roster ==
1992 Fresno State Bulldogs football team roster
Players
Coaches
Offense

Pos.	#	Name	Class
QB	12	Trent Dilfer	So
WR	81	Malcolm Floyd	Jr
RB	22	Lorenzo Neal	Sr
RB	20	Ron Rivers	Jr
TE	80	Marty Thompson	Sr
WR	5	Tydus Winans	Jr
OT	70	Jesse Hardwick	Sr
G	69	Russ Hartman	Jr
C	79	Jason James	So
G	71	Josh Coldiron	Jr
OT	60	Ron Collins	Jr

Defense

Pos.	#	Name	Class

Special teams

Pos.	#	Name	Class

Head coach

- Jim Sweeney

Coordinators/assistant coaches

Legend

- (C) Team captain
- (S) Suspended
- (I) Ineligible
- Injured
- Redshirt

== Team players in the NFL ==
The following were selected in the 1993 NFL draft.

Player	Position	Round	Overall	NFL team
Lorenzo Neal	Fullback	4	89	New Orleans Saints

The following finished their college career in 1992, were not drafted, but played in the NFL.

Player	Position	First NFL team
Marty Thompson	Tight end	1993 Detroit Lions
