= 1992 Utah State Aggies football team =

American college football season

1992 Utah State Aggies football
- Conference: Big West Conference
- Record: 5–6 (4–2 Big West)
- Head coach: Charlie Weatherbie (1st season)
- Offensive coordinator: Jim Zorn (1st season)
- Defensive coordinator: Dick Bumpas (1st season)
- Home stadium: Romney Stadium

1992 Big West Conference football standings
	Conf.					Overall
Team	W		L		T	W		L		T
Nevada $	5	–	1	–	0	7	–	5	–	0
San Jose State	4	–	2	–	0	7	–	4	–	0
Utah State	4	–	2	–	0	5	–	6	–	0
New Mexico State	3	–	3	–	0	6	–	5	–	0
UNLV	3	–	3	–	0	6	–	5	–	0
Pacific (CA)	2	–	4	–	0	3	–	8	–	0
Cal State Fullerton	0	–	6	–	0	2	–	9	–	0
$ – Conference champion

The 1992 Utah State Aggies football team represented Utah State University in the 1992 NCAA Division I-A football season. The Aggies were led by their new head coach Charlie Weatherbie and played their home games at Romney Stadium in Logan, Utah. The Aggies finished the season totaling five wins and six losses (5–6, 4–2 Big West).

== Schedule ==
Date	Opponent	Site	Result	Attendance	Source
September 5	at Arizona*	Arizona Stadium; Tucson, AZ	L 3–49	37,239	
September 12	Utah*	Romney Stadium; Logan, UT (Battle of the Brothers, Beehive Boot)	L 42–18	18,177	
September 19	at Baylor*	Floyd Casey Stadium; Waco, TX	L 45–10	28,737	
September 26	New Mexico State	Romney Stadium; Logan, UT	W 48–21	14,482	
October 2	at BYU*	Cougar Stadium; Provo, UT (rivalry, Beehive Boot)	L 9–30	65,475	
October 17	Kansas State*	Romney Stadium; Logan, UT	W 28–16	12,472	
October 24	San Jose State	Romney Stadium; Logan, UT	L 25–27	18,185	
October 31	at Cal State Fullerton	Titan Stadium; Fullerton, CA	W 26–7	2,113	
November 7	UNLV	Romney Stadium; Logan, UT	W 48–8	10,280	
November 14	at Nevada	Mackay Stadium; Reno, NV	L 47–48	21,916	
November 21	at Pacific (CA)	Stagg Memorial Stadium; Stockton, CA	W 38–35	6,189	
*Non-conference game; Source:
