= 1992 San Diego State Aztecs football team =

American college football season

1992 San Diego State Aztecs football
- Conference: Western Athletic Conference
- Record: 5–5–1 (5–3 WAC)
- Head coach: Al Luginbill (4th season)
- Offensive coordinator: Bret Ingalls (1st season)
- Offensive scheme: Pro-style
- Defensive coordinator: Barry Lamb (4th season)
- Base defense: 4–3
- Home stadium: Jack Murphy Stadium

1992 Western Athletic Conference football standings
| | Conf. | | | | | Overall |
| Team | W | | L | | T | W | | L | | T |
|---|---|---|---|---|---|---|---|---|---|---|
| No. 20 Hawaii + | 6 | – | 2 | – | 0 | 11 | – | 2 | – | 0 |
| No. 24 Fresno State + | 6 | – | 2 | – | 0 | 9 | – | 4 | – | 0 |
| BYU + | 6 | – | 2 | – | 0 | 8 | – | 5 | – | 0 |
| San Diego State | 5 | – | 3 | – | 0 | 5 | – | 5 | – | 1 |
| Air Force | 4 | – | 4 | – | 0 | 7 | – | 5 | – | 0 |
| Utah | 4 | – | 4 | – | 0 | 6 | – | 6 | – | 0 |
| Colorado State | 3 | – | 5 | – | 0 | 5 | – | 7 | – | 0 |
| Wyoming | 3 | – | 5 | – | 0 | 5 | – | 7 | – | 0 |
| New Mexico | 2 | – | 6 | – | 0 | 3 | – | 8 | – | 0 |
| UTEP | 1 | – | 7 | – | 0 | 1 | – | 10 | – | 0 |
+ – Conference co-champions; Rankings from AP Poll

The 1992 San Diego State Aztecs football team represented San Diego State University as a member of the Western Athletic Conference (WAC) during the 1992 NCAA Division I-A football season. Led by fourth-year head coach Al Luginbill, the Aztecs compiled an overall record of 5–5–1 with a mark of 5–3 conference play, placing fourth in the WAC. The team played home games at Jack Murphy Stadium in San Diego.

== Schedule ==
| Date | Opponent | Rank | Site | TV | Result | Attendance | Source |
|---|---|---|---|---|---|---|---|
| September 5 | USC* | | Jack Murphy Stadium; San Diego, CA (Ralphs Holiday Classic) | ABC | T 31–31 | 52,168 | |
| September 10 | at No. 25 BYU | | Cougar Stadium; Provo, UT | ESPN | W 45–38 | 65,261 | |
| September 26 | at No. 11 UCLA* | No. 21 | Rose Bowl; Pasadena, CA | ABC | L 7–35 | 51,501 | |
| October 3 | at New Mexico | | University Stadium; Albuquerque, NM | | W 49–21 | 23,186 | |
| October 17 | UTEP^{†} | | Jack Murphy Stadium; San Diego, CA | | W 49–27 | 46,449 | |
| October 24 | Air Force | | Jack Murphy Stadium; San Diego, CA | ESPN | L 17–20 | 36,892 | |
| October 31 | at Colorado State | | Hughes Stadium; Fort Collins, CO | Prime | W 20–13 | 16,310 | |
| November 7 | at Wyoming | | War Memorial Stadium; Laramie, WY | ABC | L 6–17 | 19,140 | |
| November 14 | No. 24 Hawaii | | Jack Murphy Stadium; San Diego, CA | Prime | W 52–28 | 50,021 | |
| November 21 | Fresno State | | Jack Murphy Stadium; San Diego, CA (rivalry) | ABC | L 41–45 | 41,523 | |
| November 28 | No. 1 Miami (FL)* | | Jack Murphy Stadium; San Diego, CA | ESPN | L 17–63 | 52,108 | |
*Non-conference game; ^{†}Homecoming; Rankings from AP Poll released prior to the game; Source:

== Roster ==
1992 San Diego State Aztecs football team roster
Players
Coaches
Offense

| Pos. | # | Name | Class |
|---|---|---|---|
| RB | 28 | Marshall Faulk | So |
| WR | | Keith Williams | Jr |

Defense

| Pos. | # | Name | Class |

Special teams

| Pos. | # | Name | Class |

Head coach

- Al Luginbill

Coordinators/assistant coaches

Legend

- (C) Team captain
- (S) Suspended
- (I) Ineligible
- Injured
- Redshirt

== Team players in the NFL ==
No SDSU players were selected in the 1993 NFL draft. The following finished their college career in 1992, were not drafted, but played in the NFL.

| Player | Position | First NFL team |
|---|---|---|
| Damon Pieri | Defensive back | 1993 New York Jets |
| Robert Griffith | Defensive back | 1994 Minnesota Vikings |

== Team awards ==
| Award | Player |
|---|---|
| Most Valuable Player (John Simcox Memorial Trophy) | Marshall Faulk |
| Outstanding Offensive & Defensive Linemen (Byron H. Chase Memorial Trophy) | Tony Nichols, Off; Jamal Duff, Def; La'Roi Glover, Def |
| Team captains Dr. R. Hardy / C.E. Peterson Memorial Trophy | David Lowery, Off; Tracey Mao, Def; Andy Trakas, Special Teams |
| Most Inspirational Player | Tracey Mao |
