= 1992 Nevada Wolf Pack football team =

American college football season

1992 Nevada Wolf Pack football

Big West champion

Las Vegas Bowl, L 34–35 vs. Bowling Green
- Conference: Big West Conference
- Record: 7–5 (5–1 Big West)
- Head coach: Chris Ault (17th season)
- Offensive coordinator: Steve Hagen (1st season)
- Offensive scheme: Air Wolf
- Base defense: 3–4
- Home stadium: Mackay Stadium

1992 Big West Conference football standings
	Conf.					Overall
Team	W		L		T	W		L		T
Nevada $	5	–	1	–	0	7	–	5	–	0
San Jose State	4	–	2	–	0	7	–	4	–	0
Utah State	4	–	2	–	0	5	–	6	–	0
New Mexico State	3	–	3	–	0	6	–	5	–	0
UNLV	3	–	3	–	0	6	–	5	–	0
Pacific (CA)	2	–	4	–	0	3	–	8	–	0
Cal State Fullerton	0	–	6	–	0	2	–	9	–	0
$ – Conference champion

The 1992 Nevada Wolf Pack football team represented the University of Nevada, Reno during the 1992 NCAA Division I-A football season. Nevada competed as a first-year member of the Big West Conference (BWC). The Wolf Pack were led by 17th-year head coach Chris Ault, who resigned after the end of the season to retain his job as athletic director. They played their home games at Mackay Stadium.

== Schedule ==
Date	Opponent	Site	TV	Result	Attendance	Source
September 5	at Wyoming*	War Memorial Stadium; Laramie, WY		L 6–25	18,256	
September 12	Pacific (CA)	Mackay Stadium; Reno, NV		W 20–14	24,111	
September 19	McNeese State*	Mackay Stadium; Reno, NV		W 31–21	22,005	
September 26	at Tulane*	Louisiana Superdome; New Orleans, LA		L 17–34	23,741	
October 3	at Cal State Fullerton	Titan Stadium; Fullerton, CA		W 19–0	4,680	
October 17	at UNLV	Sam Boyd Silver Bowl; East Las Vegas, NV (Fremont Cannon)		W 14–10	25,409	
October 24	New Mexico State	Mackay Stadium; Reno, NV		W 35–21	25,804	
October 31	Weber State*^{†}	Mackay Stadium; Reno, NV		L 21–23	19,333	
November 7	at San Jose State	Spartan Stadium; San Jose, CA		L 35–39	15,323	
November 14	Utah State	Mackay Stadium; Reno, NV		W 48–47	21,916	
November 21	Texas Southern*	Mackay Stadium; Reno, NV		W 38–14	18,946	
December 18	Bowling Green*	Sam Boyd Silver Bowl; East Las Vegas, NV (Las Vegas Bowl)	ESPN	L 34–35	15,476	
*Non-conference game; ^{†}Homecoming; Source:

== Roster ==
1992 Nevada Wolf Pack football team roster
Players
Coaches
Offense

Pos.	#	Name	Class
QB	1	Fred Gatlin	Sr
RB	26	Dedric Holmes	So
G	74	Tony Lorenzi	So
TE	80	Todd Matter	Jr
RB	45	Bryan Nolte	So
C	52	Ryan O'Donnell	Jr
OT	68	Shar Pourdanesh	Sr
WR	3	Bryan Reeves	Jr
WR	88	Mike Senior	So
OT	63	Todd Shara	Jr
WR	5	Chris Singleton	Jr
OT	70	Deron Thorp	Fr
G	57	Anthony Valentin	Jr
WR	11	Cornel West	Fr
TE	87	Fred Williams	Jr

Defense

Pos.	#	Name	Class
LB	92	Steve Bryant	Jr
DE	73	Joe Caspers	Sr
CB	23	Forey Duckett	Sr
LB	31	Andre Howard	Sr
NT	95	Jim Jones	Jr
FS	46	Xavier Kairy	Sr
CB	22	William Lackey	Sr
SS	7	Brock Marion	Sr
LB	49	Lamonte Porter	Fr
DE	97	Dewayne Sparks	Jr
DE	94	Tom Tanksley	Jr
LB	54	Matt Trontel	Jr
LB	43	Martin Washington	So
LB	44	Chris Wild	Jr

Special teams

Pos.	#	Name	Class
P	10	Steve Lester	So
PK	15	Steve Terelak	Jr

Head coach

- Chris Ault

Coordinators/assistant coaches

Legend

- (C) Team captain
- (S) Suspended
- (I) Ineligible
- Injured
- Redshirt
