= 1992 Freedom Bowl =

- Freedom Bowl IX
Fresno State Bulldogs	USC Trojans
(8–4)	(6–4–1)
24	7
Head coach: Jim Sweeney	Head coach: Larry Smith
	AP / Coaches / BC; 23 / 25 / 23
	1	2	3	4	Total
Fresno State	0	7	3	14	24
USC	0	7	0	0	7
- Date: December 28, 1992
- Season: 1992
- Stadium: Anaheim Stadium
- Location: Anaheim, California
- Attendance: 50,745

United States TV coverage
- Network: Raycom
- Announcers: Phil Stone and Dave Rowe

The 1992 Freedom Bowl was a postseason college football bowl game between the USC Trojans of the Pacific-10 Conference and the Fresno State Bulldogs of the Western Athletic Conference. It is widely considered the biggest win in Fresno State football history.

== Game summary ==
Fresno State, led by future Super Bowl champion Trent Dilfer fell to an early deficit with a USC touchdown. The Bulldogs quickly responded with a Lorenzo Neal touchdown and a Derek Mahoney field goal in the second quarter. in the second half, two more bulldog touchdowns sealed a victory for Fresno State. The Bulldogs had 241 rushing yards, 164 passing yards, 24 first downs, and over 15 minutes of possession time more than USC. The Trojans had 88 rushing yards, 95 passing yards, and only 14 first downs.
