= 1992 Las Vegas Bowl =

- 1st Las Vegas Bowl
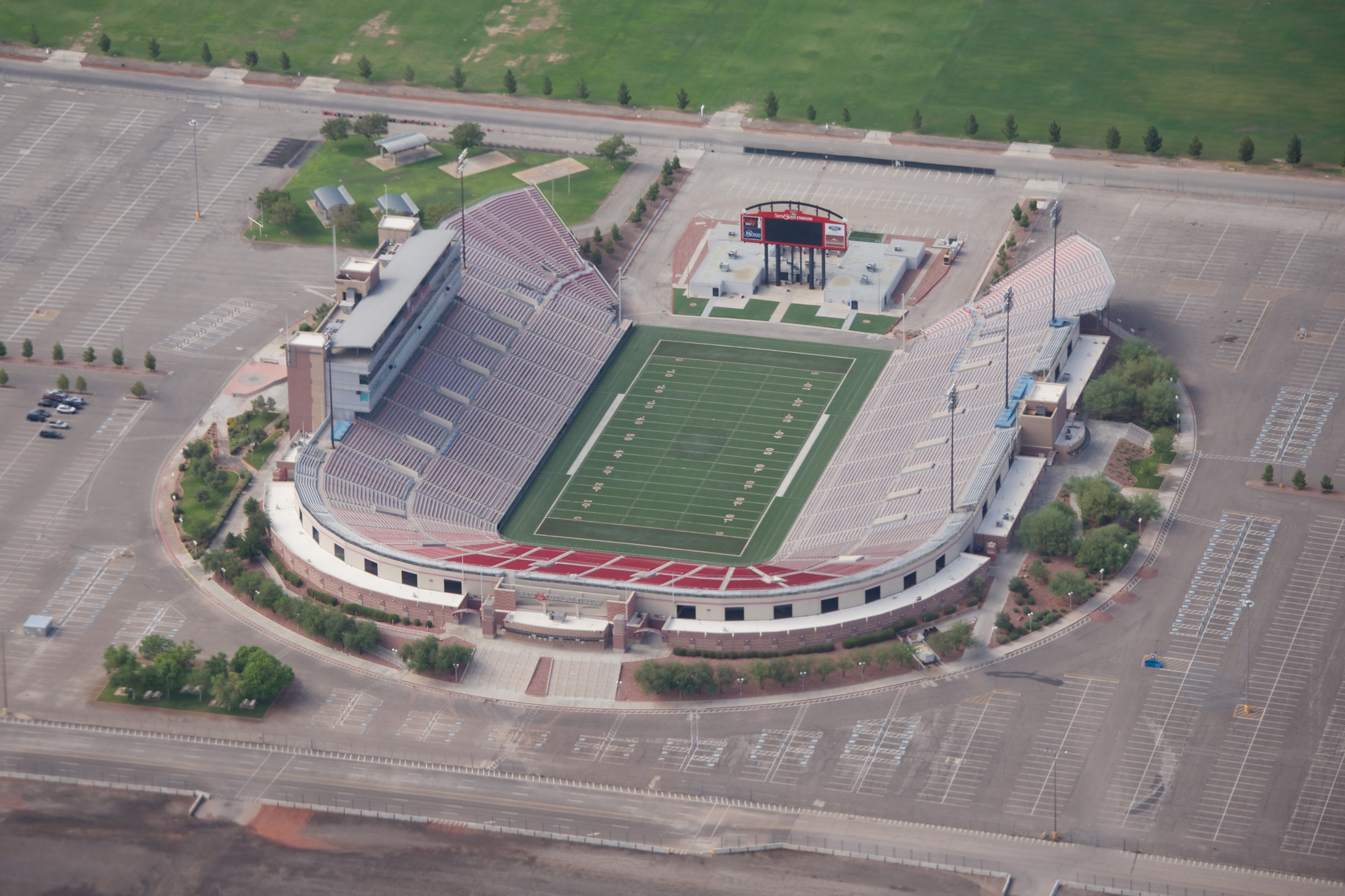
- Sam Boyd Silver Bowl in East Las Vegas, Nevada, hosted the Las Vegas Bowl.
Bowling Green Falcons	Nevada Wolf Pack
(9–2)	(7–4)
MAC	Big West
35	34
Head coach: Gary Blackney	Head coach: Chris Ault
	1	2	3	4	Total
Bowling Green	14	14	0	7	35
Nevada	3	0	21	10	34
- Date: December 18, 1992
- Season: 1992
- Stadium: Sam Boyd Silver Bowl
- Location: East Las Vegas, Nevada, U.S.
- MVP: QB Erik White (Bowling Green)
- Referee: David Neal (MAC); (split crew: MAC and Big West)
- Attendance: 15,476

United States TV coverage
- Network: ESPN
- Announcers: Ron Franklin Mike Gottfried & Sharlene Hawkes

The 1992 Las Vegas Bowl was an American college football bowl game played at Sam Boyd Silver Bowl in East Las Vegas, Nevada, on December 18, 1992. It was inaugural Las Vegas Bowl and the first game of the bowl season that concluded the 1992 NCAA Division I-A football season. The game featured the Bowling Green Falcons, champions of the Mid-American Conference (MAC), and the Nevada Wolf Pack, champions of the Big West Conference. Bowling Green won the game by a score of 35–34.

== Background ==
Both teams were champions of their respective conferences. Nevada won the Big West Conference for the first time in their first season in Division I-A. This was their first bowl game appearance since 1949. Bowling Green was champion of the Mid-American Conference for the second straight year. This was their fourth bowl game appearance in ten years.

== Game summary ==
The first half and the second half were two very different halves for both teams. Bowling Green scored on their first four possessions with two rushing touchdowns by Jackson, a touchdown pass by Erik White and a touchdown pass from Smith. Nevada could only respond with a field goal as they trailed 28–3 at halftime. But the second half is when Nevada came alive, as Chris Vargas threw two touchdowns and Holmes ran in for a touchdown to trail only 28–24 as the fourth quarter began. Reeves ran for a touchdown to give the Wolf Pack a 31–28 lead and Terelak made a short field goal to increase their lead to 34–28 with 7:13 remaining. Bowling Green drove to Nevada's six after failing to convert on 4th down. Nevada had to punt the ball after only gaining one first down, but Steve Lester's punt went errant and the Falcons recovered at the Wolf Pack 15 with 1:45 to go. After a pass play got them to the three yard line, the Falcons were stifled twice to set up fourth down with less than 30 seconds to go. White scrambled and found Dave Hankins with 22 seconds remaining in the back of the endzone for a touchdown. Brian Leaver kicked in the extra point to give the Falcons their second straight bowl win. White was the first MVP of the Las Vegas Bowl, having gone 24 of 40 for 245 yards.

== Aftermath ==
This remains Bowling Green's only Las Vegas Bowl appearance. They did not return to a bowl game again until 2003. Nevada returned two more times in the decade, 1995 and 1996.

== Statistics ==
Statistics	BG	Nevada
First downs	25	21
Yards rushing	157	94
Yards passing	253	344
Total yards	410	438
Punts-Average	5-23.2	4-16.7
Fumbles-Lost	0-0	3-2
Interceptions	0	0
Time of Possession	33:35	26:25
