= Marty Thompson =

American football player (born 1969)

No. 81
- Position: Tight end

Personal information
- Born: December 9, 1969 (age 56); Whittier, California, U.S.
- Listed height: 6 ft 3 in (1.91 m)
- Listed weight: 243 lb (110 kg)

Career information
- High school: Mammoth (Mammoth Lakes, California)
- College: Fresno State (1989–1992)
- NFL draft: 1993: undrafted

Career history
- Detroit Lions (1993–1994)

Awards and highlights
- Second-team All-Big West (1991)

Career NFL statistics
- Games played: 6
- Games started: 2
- Receptions: 1
- Receiving yards: 15
- Stats at Pro Football Reference

Glenn "Marty" Martin Thompson (born December 9, 1969) is an American former professional football tight end who played for the Detroit Lions of the National Football League (NFL). He played college football for the Fresno State Bulldogs.

== Early life ==
Thompson was born on December 9, 1969, in Whittier, California. He attended Mammoth High School in Mammoth Lakes, California.

== College career ==
Thompson played college football for the Fresno State Bulldogs from 1989 to 1992 and was a four-year letterman. He played in 45 games for the Bulldogs, catching 62 passes for 1,003 yards and ten touchdowns. Thompson holds school records for most receiving touchdowns by a tight end in a season (eight in 1991) and career (11). As a junior, he earned second-team All-Big West honors.

== Professional career ==
After going unselected in the 1993 NFL draft, Thompson signed with the Detroit Lions as an undrafted free agent. On August 30, he was released and re-signed the following day. Thompson played in the first five games, starting twice, catching one pass for 15 yards against the New England Patriots. On October 13, he was released and signed to the practice squad the next day. On December 3, Thompson was elevated to the active roster for the game against the Minnesota Vikings. On December 7, he was re-signed to the practice squad. On August 28, 1994, Thompson was released by the team.
