= 1992 Hawaii Rainbow Warriors football team =

American college football season

1992 Hawaii Rainbow Warriors football

WAC co-champion Holiday Bowl champion

Holiday Bowl, W 27–17 vs. Illinois
- Conference: Western Athletic Conference

Ranking
- Coaches: No. 20
- AP: No. 20
- Record: 11–2 (6–2 WAC)
- Head coach: Bob Wagner (6th season)
- Offensive coordinator: Paul Johnson (6th season)
- Offensive scheme: Triple option
- Base defense: 4–3
- Home stadium: Aloha Stadium

1992 Western Athletic Conference football standings
	Conf.					Overall
Team	W		L		T	W		L		T
No. 20 Hawaii +	6	–	2	–	0	11	–	2	–	0
No. 24 Fresno State +	6	–	2	–	0	9	–	4	–	0
BYU +	6	–	2	–	0	8	–	5	–	0
San Diego State	5	–	3	–	0	5	–	5	–	1
Air Force	4	–	4	–	0	7	–	5	–	0
Utah	4	–	4	–	0	6	–	6	–	0
Colorado State	3	–	5	–	0	5	–	7	–	0
Wyoming	3	–	5	–	0	5	–	7	–	0
New Mexico	2	–	6	–	0	3	–	8	–	0
UTEP	1	–	7	–	0	1	–	10	–	0
+ – Conference co-champions; Rankings from AP Poll

The 1992 Hawaii Rainbow Warriors football team represented the University of Hawaiʻi at Mānoa in the Western Athletic Conference during the 1992 NCAA Division I-A football season. In their sixth season under head coach Bob Wagner, the Rainbow Warriors compiled a 11–2 record.

== Schedule ==
Date	Time	Opponent	Rank	Site	TV	Result	Attendance	Source
September 5	10:00 am	at Oregon*		Autzen Stadium; Eugene, OR		W 24–21	32,560	
September 12	8:00 am	at Air Force		Falcon Stadium; Colorado Springs, CO (rivalry)		W 6–3	39,269	
September 26	7:00 pm	BYU		Aloha Stadium; Halawa, HI		W 36–32	50,000	
October 10	8:00 am	at Utah		Robert Rice Stadium; Salt Lake City, UT		L 17–38	30,506	
October 17	7:00 pm	Fresno State		Aloha Stadium; Halawa, HI (rivalry)		W 47–45	44,175	
October 24	7:00 pm	UNLV*^{†}		Aloha Stadium; Halawa, HI		W 55–25	38,918	
October 31	3:00 pm	at UTEP		Sun Bowl Stadium; El Paso, TX		W 41–21	20,734	
November 7	7:00 pm	Colorado State		Aloha Stadium; Halawa, HI		W 24–13	43,458	
November 14	4:00 pm	at San Diego State	No. 24	Jack Murphy Stadium; San Diego, CA		L 28–52	50,021	
November 21	7:00 pm	Wyoming		Aloha Stadium; Halawa, HI (rivalry)		W 42–18	39,604	
November 28	7:00 pm	Tulsa*		Aloha Stadium; Halawa, HI		W 38–9	35,217	
December 5	6:00 pm	Pittsburgh*		Aloha Stadium; Halawa, HI		W 36–23	46,281	
December 30	3:00 pm	vs. Illinois*		Jack Murphy Stadium; San Diego, CA (Holiday Bowl)	ESPN	W 27–17	44,457	
*Non-conference game; ^{†}Homecoming; Rankings from AP Poll released prior to the game; All times are in Hawaii–Aleutian time

== 1992 team members in the NFL ==
Player	Position	Round	Pick	NFL club
Jason Elam	Kicker	3	70	Denver Broncos
Maa Tanuvasa	Defensive tackle	8	209	Los Angeles Rams
Darrick Branch	Wide receiver	8	220	Tampa Bay Buccaneers
