= 1992 NCAA Division I-A football season =

American college football season

1992 NCAA Division I-A season
- Number of teams: 107
- Preseason AP No. 1: Miami (FL)

Postseason
- Bowl games: 18
- Heisman Trophy: Miami (FL) quarterback Gino Torretta

Bowl Coalition Championship
- 1993 Sugar Bowl
- Site: Louisiana Superdome, New Orleans, Louisiana
- Champion(s): Alabama (AP, Coaches, FWAA)

Division I-A football seasons
- ← 1991 1993 →

The 1992 NCAA Division I-A football season was the first year of the Bowl Coalition and concluded with Alabama's first national championship in thirteen years—their first since the departure of Bear Bryant. One of Bryant's former players, Gene Stallings, was the head coach, and he used a style similar to Bryant's, a smashmouth running game combined with a tough defense.

The top-tier games of the Bowl Coalition were the Sugar Bowl, Orange Bowl, Cotton Bowl Classic, and Fiesta Bowl. Under the agreement, the Sugar Bowl, Orange Bowl, and Cotton Bowl Classic hosted the Southeastern Conference, Big 8, and Southwest Conference champions, respectively, and then a pool of at large teams was formed between the Atlantic Coast Conference champ, the Big East champ, Notre Dame, and two conference runners-up from the Big 8, SWC, ACC, Big East and Pac-10. The highest ranked host team would play the highest-ranked at-large team. If the two highest ranked teams were both at-large teams, the championship game would be hosted by the Fiesta Bowl. Three other bowls—the Blockbuster Bowl, Gator Bowl, and John Hancock Bowl—were second-tier games of the Bowl Coalition.

For this year, (host) SEC champ Alabama played (at-large) Big East Champ Miami (FL), the Orange Bowl featured (host) Big-8 champ Nebraska and (at-large) ACC champ Florida State, the Cotton Bowl Classic featured (host) SWC champ Texas A&M and (at-large) independent Notre Dame, and the Fiesta Bowl featured (at-large) Big East runner up Syracuse and (at-large) Big 8 runner up Colorado.

The 1992 season also saw the expansion of the SEC and the first conference championship game to be played in the country. Before the 1992 season, the Arkansas Razorbacks and the South Carolina Gamecocks joined the SEC, which expanded the conference to twelve teams. The conference then split into two divisions, and the winner of each division would face off in the SEC Championship Game in Birmingham's historic Legion Field (later moved to Atlanta's Georgia Dome, in 1994). In the first year of the new system, Alabama won the SEC West, Florida won the SEC East, and the Tide won the match-up 28–21 on an Antonio Langham interception return for a touchdown in the closing minutes.

In the Sugar Bowl, to decide the national champion, Miami came in a heavy favorite with even heavier swagger. The Tide defense, however, with its eleven-man fronts and zone blitzes, heavily confused Heisman Trophy winner Gino Torretta and Alabama won in a defensive rout, 34–13.

In other circles, the Big West Conference lost two members; Fresno State left for the WAC and Long Beach State stopped sponsoring football, but they also gained a member in Nevada, which made the jump from Division I-AA. Nevada went 5–1 in conference, winning the Big West championship and representing the conference in the 1992 Las Vegas Bowl (formerly the California Bowl held in Fresno, California).

== Rule changes ==
- Fumbles could now be recovered and advanced by the defense anywhere on the field (previously it only applied to fumbles beyond the line of scrimmage), except for backward passes and muffed punts/kickoffs, which could be recovered by the defense but not advanced.
  - Today, the defense is still not allowed to advance muffed kicks, but has been allowed to advance backward passes since 1998.
- While overtime was not introduced for regular-season games until 1996 (and Division I-A bowl games in 1995), the Kansas tiebreaker procedure was permitted (but not needed) for the SEC Championship Game beginning in 1992. Both teams would be allowed a chance to score by beginning their drive at the opponent's 25-yard-line.

== Conference and program changes ==
- Florida State played its first season of ACC football in 1992 after many years as an independent. The Seminoles had joined the ACC in all other sports in 1991.
- Arkansas and the South Carolina joined the SEC, expanding the conference to twelve teams. Both the Razorbacks and the Gamecocks had joined the SEC in all other sports in 1991. This allowed the SEC to stage a championship game.
- Akron joined the Mid-American Conference.
- Fresno State departed the Big West for the WAC and were replaced by Nevada, formerly of Division I-AA.
- Long Beach State dropped its football program, which had been a member of the Big West.

School	1991 Conference	1992 Conference
Akron Zips	I-A Independent	MAC
Arkansas Razorbacks	SWC	SEC
Arkansas State	I-AA Independent	I-A Independent
Florida State Seminoles	I-A Independent	ACC
Fresno State Bulldogs	Big West	WAC
Long Beach State 49ers	Big West	Dropped Program
Nevada Wolf Pack	Big Sky (I-AA)	Big West (I-A)
South Carolina Gamecocks	I-A Independent	SEC

== Regular season ==
=== September ===
Miami and Washington, the co-champions of the 1991 season, were again ranked No. 1 and No. 2 in the preseason poll for 1992. They were followed by No. 3 Notre Dame, No. 4 Florida, and No. 5 Florida State. None of the top five teams had started their schedule by the time the second poll was taken, but the AP voters dropped Florida to No. 6 behind No. 4 Florida State and No. 5 Michigan.

September 5: No. 1 Miami won 24-7 at No. 23 Iowa, No. 2 Washington visited Arizona State for a 31-7 win, and No. 3 Notre Dame beat Northwestern 42-7 in Chicago. No. 4 Florida State, playing their first year in the ACC after having previously been an independent, defeated Duke 48-21. Neither No. 5 Michigan nor No. 6 Florida had started their schedules, but the voters shuffled them again in the next poll: No. 1 Miami, No. 2 Washington, No. 3 Notre Dame, No. 4 Florida, and No. 5 Florida State, with Michigan dropping to sixth.

September 12: No. 1 Miami was idle. No. 2 Washington defeated Wisconsin 27-10. No. 3 Notre Dame played No. 6 Michigan to a 17-17 tie; the Irish came back from a 10-point fourth-quarter deficit but ran out of time on their final drive. No. 4 Florida started their season with a 35-19 win over Kentucky, and No. 5 Florida State edged No. 15 Clemson 24-20. No. 7 Texas A&M beat Tulsa 19-9 and moved into the top five in the next poll: No. 1 Miami, No. 2 Washington, No. 3 Florida State, No. 4 Florida, and No. 5 Texas A&M.

September 19: No. 1 Miami shut out Florida A&M 38-0, No. 2 Washington beat No. 12 Nebraska 29-14, and No. 3 Florida State won 34-13 at No. 16 North Carolina State. No. 4 Florida fell 31-14 at No. 14 Tennessee, while No. 5 Texas A&M visited Missouri for a 26-13 victory and No. 6 Michigan defeated Oklahoma State 35-3. The top five in the next poll were No. 1 Miami, No. 2 Washington, No. 3 Florida State, No. 4 Michigan, and No. 5 Texas A&M.

September 26: No. 1 Miami barely escaped Arizona, coming away with an 8-7 victory only when the Wildcats missed a field goal with time running out. No. 2 Washington and No. 5 Texas A&M were idle. No. 3 Florida State defeated Wake Forest 35-7, and No. 4 Michigan overwhelmed Houston 61-7. Miami’s close call led the AP voters to drop them out of first place in the next poll: No. 1 Washington, No. 2 Miami, No. 3 Florida State, No. 4 Michigan, and No. 5 Texas A&M.

=== October ===
October 3: No. 1 Washington beat No. 20 USC 17-10, with the key play being a late-game interception in the end zone. The game between No. 2 Miami and No. 3 Florida State was remarkably similar to their matchup from the previous year. Despite being held without an offensive touchdown, the Seminoles led 16-10 in the fourth quarter (they had returned the opening kickoff for a TD and kicked three field goals), but the Hurricanes drove for a touchdown and later increased their lead to 19-16 by forcing a safety. Florida State got the ball back with 95 seconds left and drove to the Miami 22-yard line, but for the second year in a row their kicker’s field goal attempt went wide right as time ran out. No. 4 Michigan defeated Iowa 52-28. No. 5 Texas A&M’s game also came down to a last-second field goal, but this time the kick was successful in delivering the Aggies a 19-17 win over Texas Tech. No. 7 Tennessee shut out LSU 20-0 and moved up in the next poll: No. 1 Washington, No. 2 Miami, No. 3 Michigan, No. 4 Tennessee, and No. 5 Texas A&M.

October 10: No. 1 Washington defeated No. 24 California 35-16, No. 2 Miami survived a third straight close game with a 17-14 win at No. 7 Penn State, and No. 3 Michigan beat Michigan State 35-10. No. 4 Tennessee held a commanding lead over Arkansas with a few minutes left, but the Razorbacks (playing their first season in the SEC after moving from their longtime home in the SWC) scored a touchdown, recovered an onside kick, and converted a game-ending field goal for a 25-24 victory. No. 5 Texas A&M was idle, while No. 6 Alabama shut out Tulane 37-0. For the third time in four weeks, Texas A&M was jumped by a lower-ranked team which had pulled off an impressive win: No. 1 Washington, No. 2 Miami, No. 3 Michigan, No. 4 Alabama, and No. 5 Texas A&M.

October 17: No. 1 Washington won 24-3 at Oregon. No. 2 Miami finally had an easy victory, 45-10 over TCU. No. 3 Michigan beat Indiana 31-3, No. 4 Alabama defeated No. 13 Tennessee 17-10 thanks to a late-game interception, and No. 5 Texas A&M won 35-9 over Rice. Washington and Miami tied for No. 1 in the next poll, with the following three teams remaining the same.

October 24: No. 1 Washington beat Pacific 31-7, while fellow No. 1 Miami won 43-23 at Virginia Tech. No. 3 Michigan defeated Minnesota 63-13, No. 4 Alabama won 31-10 over Mississippi, and No. 5 Texas A&M had a controversial 19-13 win over Baylor (a first-quarter Baylor touchdown was nullified on a disputed call, and the Bears later lost the opportunity to kick a field goal when the operator failed to stop the clock after an incomplete pass). Miami was elevated to the sole No. 1 spot in the next poll, with Washington falling to No. 2 and the other teams remaining the same.

October 31: No. 1 Miami defeated West Virginia 35-23, No. 2 Washington beat No. 15 Stanford 41-7, and No. 3 Michigan won 24-17 at Purdue. No. 4 Alabama was idle, and No. 5 Texas A&M was a 41-7 victor at SMU. The AP voters shuffled the order of the top teams in the next poll: No. 1 Washington, No. 2 Miami, No. 3 Alabama, No. 4 Michigan, and No. 5 Texas A&M.

=== November–December ===
November 7: No. 1 Washington visited No. 12 Arizona, the same team which had nearly upset Miami six weeks earlier. The Huskies were not so fortunate, falling 16-3. No. 2 Miami was idle. No. 3 Alabama won 31-11 at LSU, No. 4 Michigan went to Northwestern for a 40-7 win, No. 5 Texas A&M beat Louisville 40-18, and No. 6 Florida State moved back into the top five with a 69-21 defeat of Maryland: No. 1 Miami, No. 2 Alabama, No. 3 Michigan, No. 4 Texas A&M, and No. 5 Florida State.

November 12–14: No. 1 Miami shut out Temple 48-0. No. 2 Alabama won 30-21 at No. 16 Mississippi State, clinching the SEC Western Division title and a berth in the conference’s first-ever championship game. Having already tied Notre Dame in their first game of the season, No. 3 Michigan repeated the process with a 22-22 deadlock against Illinois. Nevertheless, the Wolverines were far enough ahead in the Big Ten standings to clinch the conference title and a Rose Bowl berth. No. 4 Texas A&M beat Houston 38-30, and No. 5 Florida State overwhelmed Tulane 70-7. No. 6 Washington beat Oregon State 45-16, earning the Pac-10 crown and a bowl matchup with Michigan. The next poll featured No. 1 Miami, No. 2 Alabama, No. 3 Florida State, No. 4 Texas A&M, and No. 5 Washington.

November 21: No. 1 Miami held No. 8 Syracuse to negative-one offensive yards in the first half. The Orangemen mounted a comeback, but the Hurricanes came away with a 16-10 win when a Syracuse receiver was tackled at the Miami 3-yard line as time ran out. No. 2 Alabama and No. 3 Florida State were idle. No. 4 Texas A&M clinched the SWC title and a Cotton Bowl berth with a 37-10 victory over TCU, but No. 5 Washington finished their season with a 42-23 loss at Washington State. No. 6 Michigan closed their year with yet another tie (13-13 at No. 17 Ohio State), giving idle No. 7 Notre Dame the opportunity to move up in the next poll: No. 1 Miami, No. 2 Alabama, No. 3 Florida State, No. 4 Texas A&M, and No. 5 Notre Dame.

November 26–28: No. 1 Miami wrapped up an undefeated regular season with a 63-17 win at San Diego State, No. 2 Alabama shut out Auburn 17-0, No. 3 Florida State beat No. 6 Florida 45-24, No. 4 Texas A&M won 34-13 at Texas, and No. 5 Notre Dame visited No. 19 USC for a 31-23 victory. The top five remained the same in the next poll.

College football’s first-ever conference championship game was played on December 5, when No. 2 Alabama met No. 12 Florida for the SEC title and a Sugar Bowl berth. The Gators came back from a 14-point deficit to tie the game in the fourth quarter, but an interception return for a touchdown sealed a 28-21 Alabama victory. Thus, the Crimson Tide would face No. 1 Miami for the national championship. No. 3 Florida State would play in the Orange Bowl against No. 11 Nebraska, the Big 8 champion. No. 4 Texas A&M was undefeated and untied, but their relatively light schedule took them out of championship contention; they would face No. 5 Notre Dame in the Cotton Bowl. The major postseason matchups were rounded out by No. 6 Syracuse against No. 10 Colorado in the Fiesta Bowl and No. 7 Michigan against No. 9 Washington in the Rose Bowl.

== Conference standings ==
1992 Atlantic Coast Conference football standings
	Conf.					Overall
Team	W		L		T	W		L		T
No. 2 Florida State $	8	–	0	–	0	11	–	1	–	0
No. 17 NC State	6	–	2	–	0	9	–	3	–	1
No. 19 North Carolina	5	–	3	–	0	9	–	3	–	0
No. 25 Wake Forest	4	–	4	–	0	8	–	4	–	0
Virginia	4	–	4	–	0	7	–	4	–	0
Georgia Tech	4	–	4	–	0	5	–	6	–	0
Clemson	3	–	5	–	0	5	–	6	–	0
Maryland	2	–	6	–	0	3	–	8	–	0
Duke	0	–	8	–	0	2	–	9	–	0
$ – Conference champion; Rankings from AP Poll

1992 Big East Conference football standings
	Conf.					Overall
Team	W		L		T	W		L		T
No. 3 Miami (FL)	4	–	0	–	0	11	–	1	–	0
No. 6 Syracuse	6	–	1	–	0	10	–	2	–	0
Rutgers	4	–	2	–	0	7	–	4	–	0
No. 21 Boston College	2	–	1	–	1	8	–	3	–	1
West Virginia	2	–	3	–	1	5	–	4	–	2
Pittsburgh	1	–	3	–	0	3	–	9	–	0
Virginia Tech	1	–	4	–	0	2	–	8	–	1
Temple	0	–	6	–	0	1	–	10	–	0
The Big East did not crown an official champion until 1993 when full league play began.; Rankings from AP Poll

1992 Big Eight Conference football standings
	Conf.					Overall
Team	W		L		T	W		L		T
No. 14 Nebraska $	6	–	1	–	0	9	–	3	–	0
No. 13 Colorado %	5	–	1	–	1	9	–	2	–	1
No. 22 Kansas	4	–	3	–	0	8	–	4	–	0
Oklahoma	3	–	2	–	2	5	–	4	–	2
Oklahoma State	2	–	4	–	1	3	–	7	–	1
Kansas State	2	–	5	–	0	5	–	6	–	0
Iowa State	2	–	5	–	0	4	–	7	–	0
Missouri	2	–	5	–	0	3	–	8	–	0
$ – Bowl Coalition representative as champion % – Bowl Coalition at-large representative; Rankings from AP Poll

1992 Big Ten Conference football standings
	Conf.					Overall
Team	W		L		T	W		L		T
No. 5 Michigan $	6	–	0	–	2	9	–	0	–	3
No. 18 Ohio State	5	–	2	–	1	8	–	3	–	1
Michigan State	5	–	3	–	0	5	–	6	–	0
Illinois	4	–	3	–	1	6	–	5	–	1
Iowa	4	–	4	–	0	5	–	7	–	0
Indiana	3	–	5	–	0	5	–	6	–	0
Wisconsin	3	–	5	–	0	5	–	6	–	0
Purdue	3	–	5	–	0	4	–	7	–	0
Northwestern	3	–	5	–	0	3	–	8	–	0
Minnesota	2	–	6	–	0	2	–	9	–	0
$ – Conference champion; Rankings from AP Poll

1992 Big West Conference football standings
	Conf.					Overall
Team	W		L		T	W		L		T
Nevada $	5	–	1	–	0	7	–	5	–	0
San Jose State	4	–	2	–	0	7	–	4	–	0
Utah State	4	–	2	–	0	5	–	6	–	0
New Mexico State	3	–	3	–	0	6	–	5	–	0
UNLV	3	–	3	–	0	6	–	5	–	0
Pacific (CA)	2	–	4	–	0	3	–	8	–	0
Cal State Fullerton	0	–	6	–	0	2	–	9	–	0
$ – Conference champion

1992 Mid-American Conference football standings
	Conf.					Overall
Team	W		L		T	W		L		T
Bowling Green $	8	–	0	–	0	10	–	2	–	0
Western Michigan	6	–	3	–	0	7	–	3	–	1
Toledo	5	–	3	–	0	8	–	3	–	0
Akron	5	–	3	–	0	7	–	3	–	1
Miami (OH)	5	–	3	–	0	6	–	4	–	1
Ball State	5	–	4	–	0	5	–	6	–	0
Central Michigan	4	–	5	–	0	5	–	6	–	0
Kent State	2	–	7	–	0	2	–	9	–	0
Eastern Michigan	1	–	7	–	0	1	–	10	–	0
Ohio	1	–	7	–	0	1	–	10	–	0
$ – Conference champion

1992 Pacific-10 Conference football standings
	Conf.					Overall
Team	W		L		T	W		L		T
No. 11 Washington +	6	–	2	–	0	9	–	3	–	0
No. 9 Stanford +	6	–	2	–	0	10	–	3	–	0
No. 15 Washington State	5	–	3	–	0	9	–	3	–	0
USC	5	–	3	–	0	6	–	5	–	1
Arizona	4	–	3	–	1	6	–	5	–	1
Arizona State	4	–	4	–	0	6	–	5	–	0
Oregon	4	–	4	–	0	6	–	6	–	0
UCLA	3	–	5	–	0	6	–	5	–	0
California	2	–	6	–	0	4	–	7	–	0
Oregon State	0	–	7	–	1	1	–	9	–	1
+ – Conference co-champions; Rankings from AP Poll

1992 Southeastern Conference football standings
	Conf.					Overall
Team	W		L		T	W		L		T
Eastern Division
No. 10 Florida xy	6	–	2	–	0	9	–	4	–	0
No. 8 Georgia x	6	–	2	–	0	10	–	2	–	0
No. 12 Tennessee	5	–	3	–	0	9	–	3	–	0
South Carolina	3	–	5	–	0	5	–	6	–	0
Vanderbilt	2	–	6	–	0	4	–	7	–	0
Kentucky	2	–	6	–	0	4	–	7	–	0
Western Division
No. 1 Alabama x$	8	–	0	–	0	13	–	0	–	0
No. 16 Ole Miss	5	–	3	–	0	9	–	3	–	0
No. 23 Mississippi State	4	–	4	–	0	7	–	5	–	0
Arkansas	3	–	4	–	1	3	–	7	–	1
Auburn	2	–	5	–	1	5	–	5	–	1
LSU	1	–	7	–	0	2	–	9	–	0
Championship: Alabama 28, Florida 21
$ – Conference champion; x – Division champion/co-champions; y – Championship game participant; Rankings from AP Poll

1992 Southwest Conference football standings
	Conf.					Overall
Team	W		L		T	W		L		T
No. 7 Texas A&M $	7	–	0	–	0	12	–	1	–	0
Baylor	4	–	3	–	0	7	–	5	–	0
Rice	4	–	3	–	0	6	–	5	–	0
Texas	4	–	3	–	0	6	–	5	–	0
Texas Tech	4	–	3	–	0	5	–	6	–	0
SMU	2	–	5	–	0	5	–	6	–	0
Houston	2	–	5	–	0	4	–	7	–	0
TCU	1	–	6	–	0	2	–	8	–	1
$ – Conference champion; Rankings from AP Poll

1992 Western Athletic Conference football standings
	Conf.					Overall
Team	W		L		T	W		L		T
No. 20 Hawaii +	6	–	2	–	0	11	–	2	–	0
No. 24 Fresno State +	6	–	2	–	0	9	–	4	–	0
BYU +	6	–	2	–	0	8	–	5	–	0
San Diego State	5	–	3	–	0	5	–	5	–	1
Air Force	4	–	4	–	0	7	–	5	–	0
Utah	4	–	4	–	0	6	–	6	–	0
Colorado State	3	–	5	–	0	5	–	7	–	0
Wyoming	3	–	5	–	0	5	–	7	–	0
New Mexico	2	–	6	–	0	3	–	8	–	0
UTEP	1	–	7	–	0	1	–	10	–	0
+ – Conference co-champions; Rankings from AP Poll

1992 NCAA Division I-A independents football records
	Conf.			Overall
Team	W	L	T	W		L		T
No. 4 Notre Dame		–		10	–	1	–	1
Southern Miss		–		7	–	4	–	0
Penn State		–		7	–	5	–	0
Memphis State		–		6	–	5	–	0
Army		–		5	–	6	–	0
East Carolina		–		5	–	6	–	0
Louisiana Tech		–		5	–	6	–	0
Louisville		–		5	–	6	–	0
Northern Illinois		–		5	–	6	–	0
Tulsa		–		4	–	7	–	0
Cincinnati		–		3	–	8	–	0
Arkansas State		–		2	–	9	–	0
Southwestern Louisiana		–		2	–	9	–	0
Tulane		–		2	–	9	–	0
Navy		–		1	–	10	–	0
Rankings from AP Poll

== I-AA team wins over I-A teams ==
Italics denotes I-AA teams.

Date	Visiting team	Home team	Site	Result	Attendance	Ref.
September 5	The Citadel	Arkansas	Razorback Stadium • Fayetteville, Arkansas	10–3	35,868	
September 12	No. 9 (I-AA) Idaho	Colorado State	Hughes Stadium • Fort Collins, Colorado	37–34	18,573	
September 19	Pacific (CA)	Boise State	Bronco Stadium • Boise, Idaho	7–17	17,132	
September 26	No. 5 (I-AA) The Citadel	Army	Michie Stadium • West Point, New York	15–14	37,692	
September 26	No. 4 (I-AA) Northern Iowa	Iowa State	Cyclone Stadium • Ames, Iowa	27–10	40,646	
October 3	No. 8 (I-AA) Middle Tennessee	Northern Illinois	Huskie Stadium • DeKalb, Illinois	21–13	12,632	
October 3	Northwestern State	Arkansas State	Indian Stadium • Jonesboro, Arkansas	24–18	16,300	
October 31	Weber State	Nevada	Mackay Stadium • Reno, Nevada	23–21	19,333	
November 7	No. 9 (I-AA) Youngstown State	Ohio	Peden Stadium • Athens, Ohio	28–20		
^{#}Rankings from AP Poll released prior to game.

Note: No. 7 (I-AA) Youngstown State at Akron tied 10–10.

== No. 1 and No. 2 progress ==
Until the November 10, 1992, poll, No. 1 and No. 2 shifted between Miami and Seattle, as the Miami Hurricanes and the Washington Huskies were only points apart at the top. In the preseason poll, Miami had 40 of the 62 first place votes cast, and Washington 12. After both teams went 5–0, they each got first place votes from 31 electors, split 31½ each, and on October 13, the Huskies were ahead by a single point 1,517½ to 1,516½. The following week, there was a tie for first place for the first time in the history of the AP poll, with Miami and Washington each collecting 1,517 points (Miami had more first place votes, 31 to 30, as another writer went with 7–0–0 Alabama). The next week, Miami was ahead 1,517 to 1,516, and the week after, Washington was on top again. On November 7, the Huskies lost at Arizona, 16–3 to fall to 8–1–0. In the remaining polls, Miami was the clear cut favorite for No. 1, with 61 of the 62 votes, and Alabama was everyone's favorite No. 2. Both finished the regular season unbeaten. Since Miami was an "at-large" school, and Alabama was the highest ranked of the "host schools" (qualifying for the Sugar Bowl as the Southeastern Conference champion), the No. 1 vs. No. 2 matchup would take place in New Orleans.

== Bowl games ==
Bowl Game	Winning team		Losing team		Date
Peach Bowl	No. 19 North Carolina	21	No. 24 Mississippi State	17	1/2/93
Sugar Bowl (National Championship Game)	No. 2 Alabama	34	No. 1 Miami	13	1/1/93
Orange Bowl	No. 3 Florida State	27	No. 11 Nebraska	14	1/1/93
Cotton Bowl Classic	No. 5 Notre Dame	28	No. 4 Texas A&M	3	1/1/93
Fiesta Bowl	No. 6 Syracuse	26	No. 10 Colorado	22	1/1/93
Rose Bowl	No. 7 Michigan	38	No. 9 Washington	31	1/1/93
Florida Citrus Bowl	No. 8 Georgia	21	No. 15 Ohio State	14	1/1/93
Blockbuster Bowl	No. 13 Stanford	24	No. 21 Penn State	3	1/1/93
Hall of Fame Bowl	No. 17 Tennessee	38	No. 16 Boston College	23	1/1/93
Gator Bowl	No. 14 Florida	27	No. 12 NC State	10	12/31/92
Liberty Bowl	No. 20 Ole Miss	13	Air Force	0	12/31/92
Independence Bowl	Wake Forest	39	Oregon	35	12/31/92
John Hancock Bowl	Baylor	20	No. 22 Arizona	15	12/31/92
Holiday Bowl	Hawaii	27	Illinois	17	12/30/92
Copper Bowl	No. 18 Washington St.	31	Utah	28	12/29/92
Freedom Bowl	Fresno State	24	No. 23 USC	7	12/28/92
Aloha Bowl	Kansas	23	No. 25 BYU	20	12/25/92
Las Vegas Bowl	Bowling Green	35	Nevada	34	12/18/92

== Final rankings ==
=== Final AP Poll ===
1. Alabama
2. Florida State
3. Miami (FL)
4. Notre Dame
5. Michigan
6. Syracuse
7. Texas A&M
8. Georgia
9. Stanford
10. Florida
11. Washington
12. Tennessee
13. Colorado
14. Nebraska
15. Washington State
16. Mississippi
17. N.C. State
18. Ohio State
19. North Carolina
20. Hawaii
21. Boston College
22. Kansas
23. Mississippi State
24. Fresno State
25. Wake Forest

=== Final Coaches Poll ===
1. Alabama
2. Florida State
3. Miami (FL)
4. Notre Dame
5. Michigan
6. Texas A&M
7. Syracuse
8. Georgia
9. Stanford
10. Washington
11. Florida
12. Tennessee
13. Colorado
14. Nebraska
15. N.C. State
16. Mississippi
17. Washington State
18. North Carolina
19. Ohio State
20. Hawaii
21. Boston College
22. Fresno State
23. Kansas
24. Penn State
25. Wake Forest

== Awards and honors ==
=== Heisman Trophy voting ===
The Heisman Trophy is given to the year's most outstanding player

Player	School	Position	1st	2nd	3rd	Total
Gino Torretta	Miami (FL)	QB	310	179	112	1,400
Marshall Faulk	San Diego State	RB	164	207	174	1,080
Garrison Hearst	Georgia	RB	140	196	170	982
Marvin Jones	Florida State	LB	81	51	47	392
Reggie Brooks	Notre Dame	RB	42	53	62	294
Charlie Ward	Florida State	QB	18	18	36	126
Micheal Barrow	Miami (FL)	LB	10	10	14	64
Drew Bledsoe	Washington State	QB	6	8	14	48
Eric Curry	Alabama	DE	3	13	12	47
Glyn Milburn	Stanford	RB	5	11	10	47

=== Other major awards ===
- Maxwell Award (College Player of the Year) - Gino Torretta, Miami-FL
- Walter Camp Award (Back) - Gino Torretta
- Davey O'Brien Award (Quarterback) - Gino Torretta
- Doak Walker Award (Running Back) - Garrison Hearst, Georgia
- Dick Butkus Award (Linebacker) - Marvin Jones, Florida State
- Lombardi Award (Lineman or Linebacker) - Marvin Jones, Florida State
- Outland Trophy (Interior Lineman) - Will Shields, Nebraska
- Jim Thorpe Award (Defensive Back) - Deon Figures, Colorado
- AFCA Coach of the Year - Gene Stallings, Alabama
- Paul "Bear" Bryant Coach of the Year - Gene Stallings, Alabama

== Coaching changes ==
=== In-season ===
School	Outgoing coach	Date	Reason	Replacement
Arkansas	Jack Crowe	September 6	resigned	Joe Kines (interim)
Eastern Michigan	Jim Harkema	September 29	resigned	Jan Quarless (interim)
Pittsburgh	Paul Hackett	November 25	resigned	Sal Sunseri (interim)

== Attendances ==
Average home attendance top 3:

Rank	Team	Average
1	Michigan Wolverines	105,867
2	Tennessee Volunteers	95,924
3	Penn State Nittany Lions	94,866
