= 1992 Aloha Bowl =

American college football game

Kansas Jayhawks	BYU Cougars
(7-4)	(8-4)
23	20
Head coach: Glen Mason	Head coach: Lavell Edwards
	AP / Coaches / BC; 25 / 23 / 24
	1	2	3	4	Total
Kansas	9	3	0	11	23
BYU	7	7	6	0	20
- Date: December 25, 1992
- Season: 1992
- Stadium: Aloha Stadium
- Location: Honolulu, Hawaii

United States TV coverage
- Network: ABC
- Announcers: Mark Jones, Tim Brant, and Julie Moran

The 1992 Aloha Bowl was played on December 25, 1992, at Aloha Stadium in Honolulu, Hawaii. Kansas earned its first bowl win in 31 years over an 8-4 BYU team led by reserve quarterback Tom Young, the younger brother of NFL hall-of-famer Steve Young. Young earned the start after starting quarterback Ryan Hancock went down with a season-ending injury in the regular season finale against Utah.

== Background ==
Kansas won seven of their first eight games, even rising up to #13 in the polls before a matchup with #7 Nebraska. A 49–7 thrashing by the Cornhuskers sent them into a tailspin, as they lost to #13 Colorado and Missouri to close out their season. Despite this, the Jayhawks finished in 3rd place in the Big Eight Conference, their highest finish in the Big Eight since their 2nd-place finish in 1973. BYU started the season 1–3, with losses to San Diego State, UCLA and Hawaii. Wins over Utah State, Fresno State, and Wyoming got them back on the trail. After a loss to #10 Notre Dame, the Cougars rebounded with a win over #14 Penn State. Wins over New Mexico, Air Force and Utah closed out a season in which they finished in a three-way tie for the Western Athletic Conference championship with Hawaii and Fresno State.

== Game summary ==
BYU went up 7–0 on the game's opening play when Hema Heimuli returned the opening kickoff for a touchdown. Kansas evened the score at 7–7 two plays later when Kansas receiver Matt Gay caught a pass that was ruled a lateral from quarterback Chip Hilleary and hit a wide-open Rodney Harris for a 74-yard touchdown pass. Replays showed that the first pass was in fact 2 yards forward, which would have made the play illegal with two forward passes.

The Jayhawks took a 9–7 lead later in the first quarter when junior lineman Chris Maumalanga burst through the Cougars' offensive line to sack running back Jamal Willis in his own endzone for a safety.

Willis later gained revenge with a 29-yard touchdown run with 10:16 left in the second quarter. Following his score, BYU led 14–9. On the ensuing kickoff, senior running back Maurice Douglas broke free for a 54-yard return that put the Jayhawks on the BYU 43. The return set up a 41-yard field goal from Dan Eichloff that capped the first-half scoring at 14–12.

BYU scored on a 10-yard touchdown pass from Young to Otis Sterling and took a 20–12 lead into the fourth quarter, but Hilleary engineered a six-play, 75-yard drive – capped off by his one-yard run and successful two-point conversion – that tied the score at 20–20. After a Cougar punt, Kansas put together a seven-minute drive that ended in Dan Eichloff's game-winning 48-yard field goal. BYU did not fare well on its own field goal kicking, with David Lauder missing a pair of short field goals earlier in the half.

== Statistics ==
Statistics	Kansas	BYU
First downs	18	19
Rushing yards	172	142
Passing yards	200	262
Total offense	372	404
Passing	12–24–0	15–31–1
Fumbles–lost	0–0	1–0
Penalties–yards	7–55	7–73
Punt return yards	5	18
Kickoff return yards	79	110
Punts–average	8–48.25	4–48.25

== Aftermath ==
The Cougars made five more bowl games in the decade, with victories in two of those games. The Jayhawks went to just one more bowl game in the decade, in 1995.
