= 1992 Liberty Bowl =

- 34th Liberty Bowl
| Air Force Falcons | Ole Miss Rebels |
| (7–4) | (8–3) |
| WAC | SEC |
| 0 | 13 |
| Head coach: Fisher DeBerry | Head coach: Billy Brewer |
| | AP / Coaches / BC; 20 / 19 / 19 |
| | 1 | 2 | 3 | 4 | Total |
|---|---|---|---|---|---|
| Air Force | 0 | 0 | 0 | 0 | 0 |
| Ole Miss | 7 | 3 | 0 | 3 | 13 |
- Date: December 31, 1992
- Season: 1992
- Stadium: Liberty Bowl Memorial Stadium
- Location: Memphis, Tennessee
- MVP: Cassius Ware (LB, Ole Miss)
- Attendance: 32,107

United States TV coverage
- Network: ESPN
- Announcers: Kevin Harlan and Dan Jiggetts

The 1992 Liberty Bowl was a college football postseason bowl game played on December 31, 1992, in Memphis, Tennessee. The 34th edition of the Liberty Bowl featured the Air Force Falcons and the Ole Miss Rebels.

== Background ==
Air Force tied for fourth place in the Western Athletic Conference (WAC) while Ole Miss finished in second place in the West Division of the Southeastern Conference (SEC). This was Air Force's fourth consecutive Liberty Bowl (due to the policy of the winner of Commander in Chief's Trophy having a bid into the game), and Ole Miss' first bowl game since 1991. This was the third time the two teams faced each other in a 10-year span.

== Game summary ==
Dou Innocent gave the Rebels a 7–0 lead with 2:42 left in the first quarter. He finished the day with 65 yards on 17 carries. Brian Lee kicked two field goals from 24 and 29 yards out to make the final score 13–0 as Air Force was held to 185 yards of total offense. Russ Shows went 9-of-19 for 163 yards. Cassius Ware had 10 tackles and 2 sacks, in an MVP effort.

=== Statistics ===
| Statistics | Air Force | Ole Miss |
|---|---|---|
| First downs | 14 | 13 |
| Rushing yards | 104 | 168 |
| Passing yards | 81 | 163 |
| Total yards | 185 | 331 |
| Passing C-A-I | 10–17–2 | 9–19–0 |
| Punts–average | 7–33.0 | 5–20.2 |
| Fumbles–lost | 2–1 | 2–1 |
| Penalties–yards | 6–53 | 7–57 |

== Aftermath ==
Neither team has returned to the Liberty Bowl since this game.
