= 1992 BYU Cougars football team =

American college football season

1992 BYU Cougars football

WAC co-champion

Aloha Bowl, L 20–23 vs. Kansas
- Conference: Western Athletic Conference
- Record: 8–5 (6–2 WAC)
- Head coach: LaVell Edwards (21st season)
- Offensive coordinator: Roger French (12th season)
- Offensive scheme: West Coast
- Defensive coordinator: Ken Schmidt (2nd season)
- Base defense: 4–3
- Home stadium: Cougar Stadium

1992 Western Athletic Conference football standings
	Conf.					Overall
Team	W		L		T	W		L		T
No. 20 Hawaii +	6	–	2	–	0	11	–	2	–	0
No. 24 Fresno State +	6	–	2	–	0	9	–	4	–	0
BYU +	6	–	2	–	0	8	–	5	–	0
San Diego State	5	–	3	–	0	5	–	5	–	1
Air Force	4	–	4	–	0	7	–	5	–	0
Utah	4	–	4	–	0	6	–	6	–	0
Colorado State	3	–	5	–	0	5	–	7	–	0
Wyoming	3	–	5	–	0	5	–	7	–	0
New Mexico	2	–	6	–	0	3	–	8	–	0
UTEP	1	–	7	–	0	1	–	10	–	0
+ – Conference co-champions; Rankings from AP Poll

The 1992 BYU Cougars football team represented Brigham Young University (BYU) for the 1992 NCAA Division I-A football season. The team was led by head coach LaVell Edwards and played their home games at Cougar Stadium in Provo, Utah. The cougars participated as members of the Western Athletic Conference.

== Schedule ==
Date	Time	Opponent	Rank	Site	TV	Result	Attendance	Source
September 5	7:00 pm	at UTEP		Sun Bowl; El Paso, TX	KSL	W 38–28	46,905	
September 10	6:00 pm	San Diego State	No. 25	Cougar Stadium; Provo, UT	ESPN	L 38–45	65,261	
September 19	12:00 pm	No. 15 UCLA*		Cougar Stadium; Provo, UT	KSL	L 10–17	65,761	
September 26	11:00 pm	at Hawaii		Aloha Stadium; Honolulu, HI	KSL	L 32–36	50,000	
October 2	7:00 pm	Utah State*		Cougar Stadium; Provo, UT (Old Wagon Wheel)		W 30–9	65,475	
October 10	12:00 pm	Fresno State		Cougar Stadium; Provo, UT	KSL	W 36–24	65,396	
October 17	11:00 am	at Wyoming		War Memorial Stadium; Laramie, WY	KBYU	W 31–28	21,709	
October 24	12:30 pm	at No. 10 Notre Dame*		Notre Dame Stadium; Notre Dame, IN	NBC	L 16–42	59,075	
October 31	12:00 pm	No. 14 Penn State*		Cougar Stadium; Provo, UT	KSL	W 30–17	66,016	
November 7	12:00 pm	New Mexico		Cougar Stadium; Provo, UT	KSL	W 35–0	62,567	
November 14	12:00 pm	at Air Force		Falcon Stadium; Colorado Springs, CO	KSL	W 28–7	37,113	
November 21	12:00 pm	at Utah		Robert Rice Stadium; Salt Lake City, UT (Holy War)	KUTV	W 31–22	33,348	
December 25	1:30 pm	vs. Kansas*	No. 25	Aloha Stadium; Halawa, HI (Aloha Bowl)	ABC	L 23–20	42,933	
*Non-conference game; Rankings from AP Poll released prior to the game; All times are in Mountain time; Source:

== Game summaries ==
=== Hawaii ===
Team	1	2	3	4	Total
BYU	0	0	10	22	32
• Hawaii	10	3	3	20	36

- Date: September 26
- Location: Aloha Stadium
- Game attendance: 43,891
- Game weather: Fair; 78 °F (26 °C)

Scoring summary
Q1	HAW	Elam 47 yard field goal	HAW 3–0
Q1	HAW	Kasper 1 yard run (Elam kick)	HAW 10–0
Q2	HAW	Elam 56 yard field goal	HAW 13–0
Q3	BYU	Willis 2 yard run (Lauder kick)	HAW 13–7
Q3	BYU	Lauder 42 yard field goal	HAW 13–10
Q3	HAW	Elam 25 yard field goal	HAW 16–10
Q4	HAW	Addison 48 yard interception return (Elam kick)	HAW 23–10
Q4	HAW	Jasper 2 yard run (run failed)	HAW 29–10
Q4	BYU	Sterling 55 yard pass from Hancock (Lauder kick)	HAW 29–17
Q4	BYU	Willis 2 yard run (Lauder kick)	HAW 29–24
Q4	BYU	Rex 27 yard pass from Hancock (Heimuli pass from Hancock)	BYU 32–29
Q4	HAW	Lewis 10 yard pass from Jasper (Elam kick)	HAW 36–32

== Roster ==
1992 BYU Cougars football team roster
Players
Coaches
Offense

Pos.	#	Name	Class
WR	4	Tyler Anderson	Jr
OT	71	Scott Brumfield	Sr
RB	25	Steve Christensen	Jr
QB	8	Steve Clements	So
WR	83	Bryce Doman	So
WR	18	Eric Drage	Jr
QB	17	Ryan Hancock	So
FB	24	Kalin Hall	Jr
RB	15	Hema Heimuli	Fr
WR	42	Tim Nowatzke	So
G	70	Evan Pilgrim	So
TE	95	Byron Rex	Sr
WR		Otis Sterling	Jr
QB	7	John Walsh	So
RB	29	Jamal Willis	So

Defense

Pos.	#	Name	Class
DB	5	Derwin Gray	Sr
DE	56	Travis Hall	So
DB	23	Kapi Sikahema	Sr

Special teams

Pos.	#	Name	Class
PK	18	David Lauder	Fr

Head coach

- LaVell Edwards

Coordinators/assistant coaches

Legend

- (C) Team captain
- (S) Suspended
- (I) Ineligible
- Injured
- Redshirt

Roster

== 1993 NFL draft ==
Player	Position	Round	Pick	NFL club
Derwin Gray	Safety	4	92	Indianapolis Colts
