= 1992 NCAA Division I-A football rankings =

- Season: 1992
- Bowl season: 1992–93 bowl games
- Preseason No. 1: Miami (FL)
- End of season champions: Alabama

Two human polls comprised the 1992 National Collegiate Athletic Association (NCAA) Division I-A football rankings. Unlike most sports, college football's governing body, the NCAA, does not bestow a national championship, instead that title is bestowed by one or more different polling agencies. There are two main weekly polls that begin in the preseason—the AP Poll and the Coaches Poll.

== Legend ==
	Increase in ranking
	Decrease in ranking
	Not ranked previous week
	National champion
(#–#)	Win–loss record
(Italics)	Number of first place votes
т	Tied with team above or below also with this symbol

== AP Poll ==
	Preseason Aug 24	Week 1 Sep 1	Week 2 Sep 8	Week 3 Sep 15	Week 4 Sep 22	Week 5 Sep 29	Week 6 Oct 6	Week 7 Oct 13	Week 8 Oct 20	Week 9 Oct 27	Week 10 Nov 3	Week 11 Nov 10	Week 12 Nov 17	Week 13 Nov 24	Week 14 Dec 1	Week 15 Dec 8	Week 16 (Final) Jan 3	
1.	Miami (FL) (40)	Miami (FL) (0–0) (43)	Miami (FL) (1–0) (45)	Miami (FL) (1–0) (47)	Miami (FL) (2–0) (43)	Washington (3–0) (44)	Washington (4–0) (42)	Washington (5–0) (30 ½)	Miami (FL) (6–0) (31) т	Miami (FL) (7–0) (32)	Washington (8–0) (33 ½)	Miami (FL) (8–0) (61)	Miami (FL) (9–0) (61)	Miami (FL) (10–0) (61)	Miami (FL) (11–0) (61)	Miami (FL) (11–0) (61)	Alabama (13–0) (62)	1.
2.	Washington (12)	Washington (0–0) (9)	Washington (1–0) (9)	Washington (2–0) (11)	Washington (3–0) (15)	Miami (FL) (3–0) (12)	Miami (FL) (4–0) (16)	Miami (FL) (5–0) (30 ½)	Washington (6–0) (30) т	Washington (7–0) (29)	Miami (FL) (8–0) (27 ½)	Alabama (9–0) (1)	Alabama (10–0) (1)	Alabama (10–0) (1)	Alabama (11–0) (1)	Alabama (12–0) (1)	Florida State (11–1)	2.
3.	Notre Dame (6)	Notre Dame (0–0) (5)	Notre Dame (1–0) (4)	Florida State (2–0) (2)	Florida State (3–0) (2)	Florida State (4–0) (4)	Michigan (3–0–1) (1)	Michigan (4–0–1)	Michigan (5–0–1)	Michigan (6–0–1)	Alabama (8–0) (1)	Michigan (8–0–1)	Florida State (9–1)	Florida State (9–1)	Florida State (10–1)	Florida State (10–1)	Miami (FL) (11–1)	3.
4.	Florida	Florida State (0–0) (1)	Florida (0–0)	Florida (1–0)	Michigan (1–0–1)	Michigan (2–0–1)	Tennessee (5–0) (2)	Alabama (6–0) (1)	Alabama (7–0) (1)	Alabama (8–0) (1)	Michigan (7–0–1)	Texas A&M (9–0)	Texas A&M (10–0)	Texas A&M (11–0)	Texas A&M (12–0)	Texas A&M (12–0)	Notre Dame (10–1–1)	4.
5.	Florida State (1)	Michigan (0–0) (1)	Florida State (1–0) (1)	Texas A&M (3–0) (1)	Texas A&M (4–0) (1)	Texas A&M (4–0) (1)	Texas A&M (5–0)	Texas A&M (5–0)	Texas A&M (6–0)	Texas A&M (7–0)	Texas A&M (8–0)	Florida State (8–1)	Washington (9–1)	Notre Dame (8–1–1)	Notre Dame (9–1–1)	Notre Dame (9–1–1)	Michigan (9–0–3)	5.
6.	Michigan (1)	Florida (0–0)	Michigan (0–0) (1)	Michigan (0–0–1)	Notre Dame (2–0–1)	Notre Dame (3–0–1)	Alabama (5–0) (1)	Florida State (5–1)	Florida State (6–1)	Florida State (6–1)	Florida State (7–1)	Washington (8–1)	Michigan (8–0–2)	Florida (8–2)	Syracuse (9–2)	Syracuse (9–2)	Syracuse (10–2)	6.
7.	Texas A&M (1)	Texas A&M (1–0) (1)	Texas A&M (2–0) (1)	Notre Dame (1–0–1)	Alabama (3–0) (1)	Tennessee (4–0)	Penn State (5–0)	Colorado (5–0)	Georgia (6–1)	Georgia (7–1)	Nebraska (6–1)	Nebraska (7–1)	Notre Dame (8–1–1)	Michigan (8–0–3)	Michigan (8–0–3)	Michigan (8–0–3)	Texas A&M (12–1)	7.
8.	Penn State	Penn State (0–0) (1)	Alabama (1–0) (1)	Syracuse (2–0)	Tennessee (3–0)	Penn State (4–0)	Florida State (4–1)	Stanford (5–1)	Nebraska (4–1)	Colorado (6–0–1) т	Notre Dame (6–1–1)	Notre Dame (7–1–1)	Syracuse (9–1)	Syracuse (9–2)	Georgia (9–2)	Georgia (9–2)	Georgia (10–2)	8.
9.	Alabama (1)	Alabama (0–0) (1)	Syracuse (1–0)	Alabama (2–0) (1)	Penn State (3–0)	Alabama (4–0) (1)	Colorado (4–0)	Penn State (5–1)	Colorado (5–0–1)	Nebraska (5–1) т	Boston College (7–0–1)	Arizona (6–2–1)	Florida (7–2)	Georgia (8–2)	Colorado (9–1–1)	Washington (9–2)	Stanford (10–3)	9.
10.	Syracuse	Syracuse (0–0)	Penn State (1–0)	Penn State (2–0)	Colorado (3–0)	Colorado (4–0)	Virginia (5–0)	Georgia (5–1)	Notre Dame (4–1–1)	Notre Dame (5–1–1)	Syracuse (7–1)	Syracuse (8–1)	Georgia (8–2)	Colorado (9–1–1)	Washington (9–2)	Colorado (9–1–1)	Florida (9–4)	10.
11.	Nebraska	Nebraska (0–0)	Nebraska (1–0)	Colorado (2–0)	UCLA (2–0)	UCLA (3–0)	Stanford (4–1)	Nebraska (4–1)	Boston College (5–0–1)	Boston College (6–0–1)	USC (5–1–1)	Florida (6–2)	Colorado (8–1–1)	Washington (9–2)	Nebraska (8–2)	Nebraska (9–2)	Washington (9–3)	11.
12.	Colorado	Colorado (0–0)	Colorado (1–0)	Nebraska (2–0)	Ohio State (3–0)	Ohio State (3–0)	Georgia (4–1)	Notre Dame (4–1–1)	Syracuse (5–1)	Syracuse (6–1)	Arizona (5–2–1)	Georgia (7–2)	Nebraska (7–2)	Nebraska (7–2)	Florida (8–3)	NC State (9–2–1)	Tennessee (9–3)	12.
13.	Clemson	Clemson (0–0)	Oklahoma (1–0)	Oklahoma (2–0)	Florida (1–1)	Florida (1–1)	Notre Dame (3–1–1)	Tennessee (5–1)	Washington State (6–0)	USC (4–1–1)	Kansas (7–1)	Colorado (7–1–1)	NC State (8–2–1)	NC State (9–2–1)	NC State (9–2–1)	Stanford (9–3)	Colorado (9–2–1)	13.
14.	Georgia	Georgia (0–0)	Georgia (1–0)	Tennessee (2–0)	Virginia (3–0)	Virginia (4–0)	Nebraska (3–1)	Syracuse (4–1)	Penn State (5–2)	Penn State (6–2)	Florida (5–2)	NC State (7–2–1)	Stanford (8–3)	Stanford (9–3)	Stanford (9–3)	Florida (8–4)	Nebraska (9–3)	14.
15.	Oklahoma	Oklahoma (0–0)	Clemson (1–0)	UCLA (1–0)	Nebraska (2–1)	Nebraska (3–1)	Syracuse (3–1)	Mississippi State (4–1)	USC (3–1–1)	Stanford (6–2)	Georgia (7–2)	Stanford (7–3)	USC (6–2–1)	Ohio State (8–2–1)	Ohio State (8–2–1)	Ohio State (8–2–1)	Washington State (9–3)	15.
16.	Iowa	UCLA (0–0)	UCLA (0–0)	NC State (3–0)	Clemson (1–1)	Georgia (3–1)	Oklahoma (3–1)	Georgia Tech (4–1)	Stanford (5–2)	Tennessee (5–2)	Colorado (6–1–1)	Mississippi State (7–2)	Arizona (6–3–1)	Mississippi State (7–3)	Boston College (8–2–1)	Boston College (8–2–1)	Ole Miss (9–3)	16.
17.	Stanford	Ohio State (0–0)	California (1–0)	Clemson (1–1)	Syracuse (2–1)	Syracuse (2–1)	Georgia Tech (3–1)	Virginia (5–1)	Tennessee (5–2)	Arizona (4–2–1)	NC State (6–2–1)	Boston College (7–1–1)	Ohio State (8–2)	Boston College (8–2–1)	Tennessee (8–3)	Tennessee (8–3)	NC State (9–3–1)	17.
18.	UCLA	NC State (1–0)	Mississippi State (1–0)	Stanford (1–1)	Georgia (2–1)	Stanford (3–1)	Mississippi State (3–1)	USC (2–1–1)	Clemson (4–2)	Kansas (6–1)	North Carolina (7–2)	USC (5–2–1)	Mississippi State (7–3)	Tennessee (7–3)	Washington State (8–3)	Washington State (8–3)	Ohio State (8–3–1)	18.
19.	Ohio State	California (0–0)	NC State (2–0)	Georgia (1–1)	Stanford (2–1)	Oklahoma (2–1)	UCLA (3–1)	Clemson (3–2)	Georgia Tech (4–2)	Washington State (6–1)	Mississippi State (6–2)	Ohio State (7–2)	Boston College (7–2–1)	USC (6–3–1)	Ole Miss (8–3)	North Carolina (8–3)	North Carolina (9–3)	19.
20.	California	Stanford (0–1)	Tennessee (1–0)	Virginia (2–0)	Oklahoma (2–1)	USC (1–0–1)	USC (1–1–1)	Boston College (4–0–1)	Florida (3–2)	Florida (4–2)	Texas (5–2)	Kansas (7–2)	Tennessee (6–3)	North Carolina (8–3)	North Carolina (8–3)	Ole Miss (8–3)	Hawaii (11–2)	20.
21.	Tennessee	Mississippi State (0–0)	Stanford (0–1)	Ohio State (2–0)	San Diego State (1–0–1)	NC State (4–1)	Boston College (4–0–1) т	NC State (5–2)	Arizona (3–2–1)	NC State (6–2–1)	Stanford (6–3)	Washington State (7–2)	North Carolina (7–3)	Washington State (8–3)	Penn State (7–4)	Penn State (7–4)	Boston College (8–3–1)	21.
22.	Mississippi State	Tennessee (0–0)	Ohio State (1–0)	Georgia Tech (1–0)	USC (1–0–1)	Boston College (4–0)	Ohio State (3–1) т	Washington State (5–0)	Kansas (5–1)	North Carolina (6–2)	Ohio State (6–2)	Penn State (6–3)	Kansas (7–3)	Penn State (7–4)	Arizona (6–4–1)	Arizona (6–4–1)	Kansas (8–4)	22.
23.	Georgia Tech	Iowa (0–1)	Virginia (1–0)	San Diego State (1–0–1)	NC State (3–1)	Georgia Tech (2–1)	Florida (1–2)	Florida (2–2)	NC State (5–2–1)	Virginia (6–2)	Penn State (6–3)	Tennessee (5–3)	Penn State (6–4)	Arizona (6–4–1)	USC (6–4–1)	USC (6–4–1)	Mississippi State (7–5)	23.
24.	BYU	Georgia Tech (0–0)	Georgia Tech (0–0)	Mississippi State (1–1)	Kansas (3–0)	Mississippi State (2–1)	California (3–1)	West Virginia (3–0–2)	Virginia (5–2)	Mississippi State (5–2)	Tennessee (5–3)	Hawaii (7–1)	Ole Miss (7–3)	Ole Miss (7–3)	Mississippi State (7–4)	Mississippi State (7–4)	Fresno State (9–4)	24.
25.	Texas	Virginia (0–0)	BYU (1–0)	Ole Miss (2–0)	Boston College (3–0)	Clemson (1–2)	Clemson (2–2) т; NC State (4–2) т	Kansas (4–1)	Mississippi State (4–2)	Texas (4–2)	Washington State (6–2)	North Carolina (7–3)	Wake Forest (7–3)	BYU (8–4)	BYU (8–4)	BYU (8–4)	Wake Forest (8–4)	25.
	Preseason Aug 24	Week 1 Sep 1	Week 2 Sep 8	Week 3 Sep 15	Week 4 Sep 22	Week 5 Sep 29	Week 6 Oct 6	Week 7 Oct 13	Week 8 Oct 20	Week 9 Oct 27	Week 10 Nov 3	Week 11 Nov 10	Week 12 Nov 17	Week 13 Nov 24	Week 14 Dec 1	Week 15 Dec 8	Week 16 (Final) Jan 3	
		Dropped: BYU; Texas	Dropped: Iowa	Dropped: BYU; California	Dropped: Georgia Tech; Ole Miss; Mississippi State	Dropped: Kansas; San Diego State	None	Dropped: California; Ohio State; Oklahoma; UCLA	Dropped: West Virginia	Dropped: Clemson; Georgia Tech	Dropped: Virginia	Dropped: Texas	Dropped: Hawaii; Washington State	Dropped: Kansas; Wake Forest	None	None	Dropped: Penn State; Arizona; USC; BYU	

== Coaches Poll ==
	Preseason Aug 17	Week 1 Aug 31	Week 2 Sep 8	Week 3 Sep 14	Week 4 Sep 21	Week 5 Sep 28	Week 6 Oct 5	Week 7 Oct 12	Week 8 Oct 19	Week 9 Oct 26	Week 10 Nov 2	Week 11 Nov 9	Week 12 Nov 16	Week 13 Nov 23	Week 14 Nov 30	Week 15 Dec 7	Week 16 (Final) Jan 4	
1.	Miami (FL) (40)	Miami (FL) (0–0) (43)	Miami (FL) (1–0) (45)	Miami (FL) (1–0) (47)	Miami (FL) (2–0) (45)	Washington (3–0) (43)	Washington (4–0) (38)	Miami (FL) (5–0) (31)	Miami (FL) (6–0) (31)	Miami (FL) (7–0) (37)	Miami (FL) (8–0) (30)	Miami (FL) (8–0) (59)	Miami (FL) (9–0) (59)	Miami (FL) (10–0) (60)	Miami (FL) (11–0) (59)	Miami (FL) (11–0) (59)	Alabama (13–0) (60)	1.
2.	Washington (14)	Washington (0–0) (12)	Washington (1–0) (13)	Washington (2–0) (13)	Washington (3–0) (15)	Miami (FL) (3–0) (16)	Miami (FL) (4–0) (22)	Washington (5–0) (29)	Washington (6–0) (29)	Washington (7–0) (22)	Washington (8–0) (30)	Alabama (9–0) (1)	Alabama (10–0) (1)	Alabama (10–0)	Alabama (11–0)	Alabama (12–0)	Florida State (11–1)	2.
3.	Notre Dame (3)	Notre Dame (0–0) (3)	Notre Dame (1–0) (2)	Florida State (2–0)	Florida State (3–0)	Florida State (4–0) (1)	Michigan (3–0–1)	Michigan (4–0–1)	Michigan (5–0–1)	Michigan (6–0–1) (1)	Alabama (8–0)	Michigan (8–0–1)	Texas A&M (10–0)	Texas A&M (11–0)	Texas A&M (12–0) (1)	Texas A&M (12–0) (1)	Miami (FL) (11–1)	3.
4.	Florida State	Florida State (0–0)	Florida State (1–0)	Florida (1–0)	Texas A&M (4–0)	Michigan (2–0–1)	Texas A&M (5–0)	Texas A&M (5–0)	Alabama (7–0)	Alabama (8–0)	Michigan (7–0–1) (1)	Texas A&M (9–0)	Florida State (9–1)	Florida State (9–1)	Florida State (10–1)	Florida State (10–1)	Notre Dame (10–1–1)	4.
5.	Michigan	Florida (0–0)	Michigan (0–0)	Texas A&M (3–0)	Michigan (1–0–1)	Texas A&M (4–0)	Penn State (5–0)	Alabama (6–0)	Texas A&M (6–0)	Texas A&M (7–0)	Texas A&M (8–0)	Florida State (8–1) т	Washington (9–1)	Notre Dame (8–1–1)	Notre Dame (9–1–1)	Notre Dame (9–1–1)	Michigan (9–0–3)	5.
6.	Florida (1)	Michigan (0–0)	Florida (0–0)	Michigan (0–0–1)	Notre Dame (2–0–1)	Penn State (4–0)	Tennessee (5–0)	Florida State (5–1)	Florida State (6–1)	Florida State (6–1)	Florida State (7–1)	Nebraska (7–1) т	Notre Dame (8–1–1)	Colorado (9–1–1)	Colorado (9–1–1)	Colorado (9–1–1)	Texas A&M (12–1)	6.
7.	Texas A&M	Penn State (0–0) (2)	Texas A&M (2–0)	Notre Dame (1–0–1)	Penn State (3–0)	Notre Dame (3–0–1)	Alabama (5–0)	Colorado (5–0)	Nebraska (4–1)	Nebraska (5–1)	Nebraska (6–1)	Washington (8–1)	Syracuse (9–1)	Georgia (8–2)	Michigan (8–0–3)	Michigan (8–0–3)	Syracuse (10–2)	7.
8.	Penn State (2)	Texas A&M (1–0)	Alabama (1–0)	Penn State (2–0)	Alabama (3–0)	Tennessee (4–0)	Florida State (4–1)	Nebraska (4–1)	Georgia (6–1)	Georgia (7–1)	Notre Dame (6–1–1)	Notre Dame (7–1–1)	Michigan (8–0–2)	Michigan (8–0–3)	Georgia (9–2)	Georgia (9–2)	Georgia (10–2)	8.
9.	Alabama	Alabama (0–0)	Syracuse (1–0)	Alabama (2–0)	Tennessee (3–0)	Alabama (4–0)	Colorado (5–0)	Penn State (5–1)	Colorado (5–0–1)	Colorado (6–0–1)	Boston College (7–0–1) т	Syracuse (8–1)	Colorado (8–1–1)	Syracuse (9–2)	Syracuse (9–2)	Syracuse (9–2)	Stanford (10–3)	9.
10.	Syracuse	Syracuse (0–0)	Penn State (1–0)	Syracuse (2–0)	Colorado (3–0)	Colorado (4–0)	Virginia (5–0)	Stanford (5–1)	Notre Dame (4–1–1)	Notre Dame (5–1–1)	Syracuse (7–1) т	Arizona (6–2–1)	Georgia (8–2)	Florida (8–2)	Nebraska (8–2)	Nebraska (9–2)	Washington (9–3)	10.
11.	Nebraska	Nebraska (0–0)	Nebraska (1–0)	Nebraska (2–0)	Ohio State (3–0)	UCLA (3–0)	Nebraska (3–1)	Georgia (5–1)	Syracuse (5–1)	Syracuse (6–1)	USC (5–1–1)	Colorado (7–1–1)	Florida (7–2)	NC State (9–2–1)	Washington (9–2)	Washington (9–2)	Florida (9–4)	11.
12.	Oklahoma	Oklahoma (0–0)	Oklahoma (1–0)	Oklahoma (2–0)	UCLA (2–0)	Ohio State (3–0)	Stanford (4–1)	Notre Dame (4–1–1)	Boston College (5–0–1)	Boston College (6–0–1)	Kansas (7–1)	Georgia (7–2)	Nebraska (7–2)	Nebraska (7–2)	NC State (9–2–1)	NC State (9–2–1)	Tennessee (9–3)	12.
13.	Clemson	Colorado (0–0)	Colorado (1–0)	Colorado (2–0)	Florida (1–1)	Virginia (4–0)	Georgia (4–1)	Tennessee (5–1)	Washington State (6–0)	Penn State (6–2)	Georgia (7–2)	Florida (6–2)	NC State (8–2–1)	Washington (9–2)	Stanford (9–3)	Stanford (9–3)	Colorado (9–2–1)	13.
14.	Colorado	Clemson (0–0)	Clemson (1–0)	Tennessee (2–0)	Virginia (3–0)	Nebraska (3–1)	Notre Dame (3–1–1)	Syracuse (4–1)	Penn State (5–2)	USC (4–1–1)	Florida (5–2)	NC State (7–2–1)	USC (6–2–1)	Stanford (9–3)	Ohio State (8–2–1)	Ohio State (8–2–1)	Nebraska (9–3)	14.
15.	Iowa	Georgia (0–0)	Georgia (1–0)	NC State (3–0)	Nebraska (2–1)	Florida (1–1)	Syracuse (3–1)	Georgia Tech (4–1)	Clemson (4–2)	Tennessee (5–2)	Arizona (5–2–1)	Boston College (7–1–1)	Stanford (8–3)	Ohio State (8–2–1)	Florida (8–3)	Florida (8–4)	NC State (9–3–1)	15.
16.	Georgia	UCLA (0–0)	NC State (2–0)	UCLA (1–0)	Clemson (1–1)	Georgia (3–1)	Oklahoma (3–1)	Virginia (5–1)	Tennessee (5–2)	Kansas (6–1) т	Colorado (6–1–1)	Mississippi State (7–2)	Ohio State (8–2)	Boston College (8–2–1)	Boston College (8–2–1)	Boston College (8–2–1)	Ole Miss (9–3)	16.
17.	UCLA	NC State (1–0)	Tennessee (1–0)	Clemson (1–1)	Syracuse (2–1)	Syracuse (2–1)	Georgia Tech (3–1)	Mississippi State (4–1)	Stanford (5–2)	Stanford (6–2) т	NC State (6–2–1)	Stanford (7–3)	Arizona (6–3–1)	Mississippi State (7–3)	Tennessee (8–3)	Tennessee (8–3)	Washington State (9–3)	17.
18.	Ohio State	Ohio State (0–0)	UCLA (0–0)	Ohio State (2–0)	Georgia (2–1)	NC State (4–1)	UCLA (3–1)	Boston College (4–0–1)	USC (3–1–1)	Washington State (6–1)	North Carolina (7–2)	Ohio State (7–2)	Mississippi State (7–3)	Tennessee (7–3)	North Carolina (8–3)	Washington State (8–3)	North Carolina (9–3)	18.
19.	Tennessee	Tennessee (0–0)	Mississippi State (1–0)	Virginia (2–0)	Stanford (2–1)	Stanford (3–1)	Mississippi State (3–1)	Clemson (3–2)	Georgia Tech (4–2)	Arizona (4–2–1)	Mississippi State (6–2)	Kansas (7–2)	Boston College (7–2–1)	North Carolina (8–3)	Washington State (8–3)	Ole Miss (8–3)	Ohio State (8–3–1)	19.
20.	Stanford	Iowa (0–1)	California (1–0)	Georgia Tech (1–0)	Oklahoma (2–1)	Oklahoma (2–1)	Ohio State (3–1)	NC State (5–2)	Florida (3–2)	Florida (4–2)	Texas (5–2)	USC (5–2–1)	Tennessee (6–3)	Washington State (8–3)	Ole Miss (8–3)	North Carolina (8–3)	Hawaii (11–2)	20.
21.	BYU	BYU (0–0)	Ohio State (1–0)	San Diego State (1–0–1)	San Diego State (1–0–1)	USC (1–0–1)	Boston College (4–0–1)	Washington State (5–0)	Kansas (5–1)	NC State (6–2–1)	Penn State (6–3)	Penn State (6–3)	Kansas (7–3)	Penn State (7–4)	Penn State (7–4)	Penn State (7–4)	Boston College (8–3–1)	21.
22.	California	Stanford (0–1)	BYU (1–0)	Stanford (1–1)	USC (1–0–1)	Boston College (4–0)	Clemson (2–2)	USC (2–1–1)	Arizona (3–2–1)	Virginia (6–2)	Stanford (6–3)	Washington State (7–2)	North Carolina (7–3)	Arizona (6–4–1)	Arizona (6–4–1)	Arizona (6–4–1)	Fresno State (9–4)	22.
23.	Georgia Tech т	Texas (0–0)	Virginia (1–0)	Georgia (1–1)	NC State (3–1)	Georgia Tech (2–1)	California (3–1)	Florida (2–2)	NC State (5–2–1)	North Carolina (6–2)	Ohio State (6–2)	Hawaii (7–1)	Penn State (6–4)	USC (6–3–1)	BYU (8–4)	BYU (8–4)	Kansas (8–4)	23.
24.	Texas т	Georgia Tech (0–0)	Georgia Tech (0–0)	Ole Miss (2–0)	Kansas (3–0)	Clemson (1–2)	Florida (1–2) т	West Virginia (3–0–2)	Virginia (5–2)	Mississippi State (5–2)	Washington State (6–2)	Tennessee (5–3)	Ole Miss (7–3)	Ole Miss (7–3)	USC (6–4–1)	Hawaii (10–2)	Penn State (7–5)	24.
25.	USC	California (0–0)	Stanford (0–1)	Illinois (2–0)	North Carolina (3–0)	West Virginia (3–0–1)	West Virginia (3–0–2) т	Kansas (4–1)	Oklahoma (3–2–1)	Clemson (4–3)	Hawaii (6–1) т; Tennessee (5–3) т	North Carolina (7–3)	Hawaii (7–2) т; Washington State (7–3) т	BYU (8–4)	Hawaii (9–2)	USC (6–4–1)	Wake Forest (8–4)	25.
	Preseason Aug 17	Week 1 Aug 31	Week 2 Sep 8	Week 3 Sep 14	Week 4 Sep 21	Week 5 Sep 28	Week 6 Oct 5	Week 7 Oct 12	Week 8 Oct 19	Week 9 Oct 26	Week 10 Nov 2	Week 11 Nov 9	Week 12 Nov 16	Week 13 Nov 23	Week 14 Nov 30	Week 15 Dec 7	Week 16 (Final) Jan 4	
		Dropped: USC	Dropped: Iowa; Texas	Dropped: Mississippi State; California; BYU	Dropped: Georgia Tech; Ole Miss; Illinois	Dropped: San Diego State; Kansas; North Carolina	Dropped: NC State; USC	Dropped: Oklahoma; UCLA; Ohio State; California	Dropped: Mississippi State; West Virginia	Dropped: Georgia Tech; Oklahoma	Dropped: Virginia; Clemson	Dropped: Texas	None	Dropped: Kansas; Hawaii	Dropped: Mississippi State	None	Dropped: Arizona; BYU; USC	
