= 1992 Penn State Nittany Lions football team =

American college football season

1992 Penn State Nittany Lions football

Blockbuster Bowl, L 3–24 vs. Stanford
- Conference: Independent

Ranking
- Coaches: No. 24
- Record: 7–5
- Head coach: Joe Paterno (27th season)
- Offensive coordinator: Fran Ganter (9th season)
- Offensive scheme: Pro-style
- Defensive coordinator: Jerry Sandusky (16th season)
- Base defense: 4–3
- Captains: John Gerak; Reggie Givens; O. J. McDuffie; Brett Wright
- Home stadium: Beaver Stadium

1992 NCAA Division I-A independents football records
	Conf.			Overall
Team	W	L	T	W		L		T
No. 4 Notre Dame		–		10	–	1	–	1
Southern Miss		–		7	–	4	–	0
Penn State		–		7	–	5	–	0
Memphis State		–		6	–	5	–	0
Army		–		5	–	6	–	0
East Carolina		–		5	–	6	–	0
Louisiana Tech		–		5	–	6	–	0
Louisville		–		5	–	6	–	0
Northern Illinois		–		5	–	6	–	0
Tulsa		–		4	–	7	–	0
Cincinnati		–		3	–	8	–	0
Arkansas State		–		2	–	9	–	0
Southwestern Louisiana		–		2	–	9	–	0
Tulane		–		2	–	9	–	0
Navy		–		1	–	10	–	0
Rankings from AP Poll

The 1992 Penn State Nittany Lions football team represented the Pennsylvania State University as an independent during the 1992 NCAA Division I-A football season. Led by 27th-year head coach Joe Paterno, the Nittany Lions compiled a record of 7–5. Penn State was invited to the Blockbuster Bowl, where the Nittany Lions lost to Stanford. The team played home games at Beaver Stadium in University Park, Pennsylvania.

This was Penn State's final season as an independent as the Nittany Lions began play in the Big Ten Conference in 1993.

== Schedule ==
Date	Time	Opponent	Rank	Site	TV	Result	Attendance	Source
September 5	7:00 p.m.	at Cincinnati	No. 8	Nippert Stadium; Cincinnati, OH		W 24–20	29,099	
September 12	1:00 p.m.	Temple	No. 10	Beaver Stadium; University Park, PA		W 49–8	94,892	
September 19	1:00 p.m.	Eastern Michigan	No. 10	Beaver Stadium; University Park, PA		W 52–7	94,578	
September 26	1:00 p.m.	Maryland	No. 9	Beaver Stadium; University Park, PA (rivalry)		W 49–13	95,891	
October 3	6:00 p.m.	at Rutgers	No. 8	Giants Stadium; East Rutherford, NJ		W 38–24	61,526	
October 10	12:00 p.m.	No. 2 Miami (FL)	No. 7	Beaver Stadium; University Park, PA	ABC	L 14–17	96,704	
October 17	12:00 p.m.	No. 20 Boston College^{†}	No. 9	Beaver Stadium; University Park, PA	ABC	L 32–35	96,130	
October 24	3:30 p.m.	at West Virginia	No. 14	Mountaineer Field; Morgantown, WV (rivalry)	ABC	W 40–26	66,663	
October 31	2:00 p.m.	at BYU	No. 14	Cougar Stadium; Provo, UT		L 17–30	66,016	
November 14	1:30 p.m.	at No. 8 Notre Dame	No. 22	Notre Dame Stadium; Notre Dame, IN (rivalry)	NBC	L 16–17	59,075	
November 21	4:00 p.m.	Pittsburgh	No. 23	Beaver Stadium; University Park, PA (rivalry)	ESPN	W 57–13	91,000	
January 1, 1993	1:30 p.m.	vs. No. 13 Stanford	No. 21	Joe Robbie Stadium; Miami Gardens, FL (Blockbuster Bowl)	CBS	L 3–24	45,554	
^{†}Homecoming; Rankings from AP Poll released prior to the game; All times are in Eastern time; Source:

== Roster ==
1992 Penn State Nittany Lions football team roster
Players
Coaches
Offense

Pos.	#	Name	Class
RB	20	Richie Anderson	Sr
RB	2	Mike Archie	Fr
TE	81	Kyle Brady	So
OT	67	Todd Burger	Sr
WR	11	Chris Campbell	Fr
RB	32	Ki-Jana Carter	Fr
QB	12	Kerry Collins	So
WR	4	Phil Collins	So
TE	18	Troy Drayton	Sr
WR	10	Bobby Engram	Fr
G	57	John Gerak	Sr
OT	66	Greg Huntington	Sr
WR	24	O. J. McDuffie	Sr
C	60	Bucky Greeley	So
G	50	Jeff Hartings	Fr
WR	80	Rob Holmberg	Jr
QB	22	Matt Nardolillo	Sr
RB	29	Brian O'Neal	Jr
OT	69	Derick Pickett	Jr
QB	14	Wally Richardson	Fr
G	54	Marco Rivera	Fr
OT	71	Todd Rucci	Sr
QB	9	John Sacca	Fr
C	77	E. J. Sandusky	Sr
WR	31	Freddie Scott	Fr
WR	1	Tisen Thomas	Jr

Defense

Pos.	#	Name	Class
DT	55	Lou Benfatti	Jr
CB	35	Derek Bochna	Jr
SS	48	Chris Cisar	Sr
S	46	Marlon Forbes	So
LB	16	Brian Gelzheiser	So
LB	58	Reggie Givens	Sr
CB	17	Mark Graham	Sr
CB	21	Shelly Hammonds	Jr
DT	97	Tyoka Jackson	Jr
LB	92	Terry Killens	Fr
S	19	Brian King	Fr
S	7	Josh Kroell	Fr
LB	99	Rich McKenzie	Sr
LB	38	Brian Monaghan	Jr
LB	82	Jeff Perry	Jr
LB	94	Eric Ravotti	Jr
LB	52	Willie Smith	So
DT	78	Vin Stewart	So
DT	98	David Thomas	Fr
LB	38	Jon Witman	Fr
LB	15	Frank Yeboah-Kodie	Jr
LB	43	Phil Yeboah-Kodie	So

Special teams

Pos.	#	Name	Class
P	14	Jamie Dreese	Sr

Head coach

- Joe Paterno

Coordinators/assistant coaches

Legend

- (C) Team captain
- (S) Suspended
- (I) Ineligible
- Injured
- Redshirt

Roster

== NFL draft ==
Eight Nittany Lions were drafted in the 1993 NFL draft.

Round	Pick	Overall	Name	Position	Team
1st	25	25	O.J. McDuffie	Wide receiver	Miami Dolphins
2nd	10	39	Troy Drayton	Tight end	Los Angeles Rams
2nd	22	51	Todd Rucci	Offensive tackle	New England Patriots
3rd	1	57	John Gerak	Offensive guard	Minnesota Vikings
5th	16	128	Greg Huntington	Center	Washington Redskins
6th	4	144	Richie Anderson	Running back	New York Jets
6th	13	153	Rich McKenzie	Linebacker	Cleveland Browns
8th	17	213	Reggie Givens	Linebacker	Dallas Cowboys
