= 1993 Detroit Lions season =

NFL team season

- Owner: William Clay Ford Sr.
- General manager: Chuck Schmidt
- Head coach: Wayne Fontes
- Offensive coordinator: Dan Henning
- Defensive coordinator: Hank Bullough
- Home stadium: Pontiac Silverdome

Results
- Record: 10–6
- Division place: 1st NFC Central
- Playoffs: Lost Wild Card Playoffs (vs. Packers) 24–28

The 1993 season was the Detroit Lions' 64th season in the National Football League (NFL), their 60th In Detroit, and their fifth under the head coach Wayne Fontes. The Lions improved upon their 5–11 record from the previous season, after a win against the Minnesota Vikings in Week 9, finishing at 10–6 and winning the NFC Central Division for the second time in three years.

In the playoffs, the Lions were upset in the Wild Card Round at home by the Green Bay Packers on a Brett Favre 40-yard touchdown pass to Sterling Sharpe with 55 seconds left.

The 1993 season was the last time they would win the NFC Central and was their last division championship until 2023.

== Offseason ==
Additions	Subtractions
TE Rodney Holman (Bengals)	DT Jerry Ball (Browns)
T Dave Lutz (Chiefs)	CB Sheldon White (Bengals)
LB Pat Swilling (Saints)	C Brad Leggett (Saints)
C Mark Rodenhauser (Bears)	WR Mike Farr (Patriots)
G David Richards (Chargers)	T/G Eric Sanders (retirement)
G Bill Fralic (Falcons)	
LB Burnell Dent (Packers)	
CB Tim McKyer (Falcons)	

=== NFL draft ===
1993 Detroit Lions draft
Round	Pick	Player	Position	College	Notes
2	33	Ryan McNeil *	CB	Miami	from N.Y. Jets
3	62	Antonio London	DT	Alabama	
3	68	Mike Compton	C	West Virginia	from Cleveland
6	147	Greg Jeffries	S	Virginia	
7	174	Ty Hallock	LB	Michigan State	
8	201	Kevin Miniefield	CB	Arizona State	
Made roster * Made at least one Pro Bowl during career

Notes

- Detroit traded its first- and fourth-round selections (8th and 89th) to New Orleans in exchange for LB Pat Swilling.
- Detroit traded up from its second-round selection (36th) with the N.Y. Jets for the Jets' second-round selection (33rd), giving up its fifth-round selection (120th).
- Detroit received Cleveland's third-round selection (68th) in return for DT Jerry Ball.

=== Undrafted free agents ===
1993 undrafted free agents of note
Player	Position	College
Sean Conley	Kicker	Pittsburgh
Demeris Johnson	Wide receiver	Western Illinois
Joe Jacobs	Defensive End	Utah State
Ricky Logo	Defensive tackle	NC State
Kyle Moore	Defensive End	Kansas
Rick Perry	Defensive End	Southwest Missouri State
Larry Ryans	Wide receiver	Clemson
Marty Thompson	Tight end	Fresno State
Mack Travis	Defensive tackle	California
Dwayne Ware	Defensive back	Michigan
Shaumbee Wright-Fair	Running back	Washington State

== Personnel ==
=== Staff ===
1993 Detroit Lions staff
Front office: Owner and president – William Clay Ford Sr.; Executive vice president and chief operating officer – Chuck Schmidt; Treasurer – William Clay Ford Jr.; Director of player personnel – Ron Hughes; Director of pro scouting – Kevin Colbert; Head coaches: Head coach – Wayne Fontes; Assistant head coach – Dave Levy; Offensive coaches: Offensive coordinator – Dan Henning; Running backs – Billie Matthews; Receivers – Charlie Sanders; Offensive line – Jerry Wampfler; Offensive assistant – Dave Jaumotte	Defensive coaches: Defensive coordinator – Hank Bullough; Defensive line – Lamar Leachman; Inside linebackers – Herb Paterra; Outside linebackers – Don Clemons; Defensive backs – John Fontes; Special teams coaches: Special teams – Frank Gansz; Strength and conditioning: Strength and conditioning/defensive assistant – Bert Hill

=== Roster ===
1993 Detroit Lions roster
Quarterbacks (QB): 12 Erik Kramer; 9 Rodney Peete; 11 Andre Ware; Running backs (RB): 43 Gary Anderson; 23 Mel Gray; 26 Eric Lynch; 31 Derrick Moore; 20 Barry Sanders; Wide receivers (WR): 40 Reggie Barrett; 87 Jeff Campbell; 86 Willie Green; 83 Aubrey Matthews; 84 Herman Moore; 80 Brett Perriman; Tight ends (TE): 49 Ty Hallock; 82 Rodney Holman	Offensive linemen (OL): 66 Shawn Bouwens G; 75 Lomas Brown T; 74 Mike Compton G; 76 Scott Conover T; 79 Bill Fralic G; 53 Kevin Glover C; 73 Dave Lutz T; 67 David Richards G; 63 Mark Rodenhauser; 71 Larry Tharpe T; Defensive linemen (DL): 90 Dan Owens DE; 96 Lawrence Pete NT; 91 Robert Porcher DE; 94 Kelvin Pritchett DE; 92 Marc Spindler; 92 Mack Travis NT	Linebackers (LB): 50 Toby Caston ILB; 98 Dennis Gibson ILB; 99 Tracy Hayworth OLB; 58 George Jamison OLB; 57 Victor Jones ILB; 51 Antonio London OLB; 59 Tracy Scroggins OLB; 54 Chris Spielman ILB; 56 Pat Swilling OLB; Defensive backs (DB): 36 Bennie Blades FS; 32 Willie Clay FS; 21 Harry Colon FS; 39 Ray Crockett CB; 25 Greg Jeffries CB; 24 Melvin Jenkins CB; 33 Tim McKyer CB; 47 Ryan McNeil CB; 38 Kevin Scott CB; 35 William White SS; Special teams (ST): 6 Jim Arnold P; 4 Jason Hanson K	Practice squad: 44 Bob Brasher TE; 77 Don Reynolds DE; 41 Larry Ryans WR; 81 Marty Thompson; 30 Shaumbe Wright-Fair RB; Reserve: 55 Mike Cofer LB (PUP); 34 Ed Tillison RB (PUP); Rookies in italics 53 active, 2 reserve, 5 practice squad

== Regular season ==
=== Schedule ===
Week	Date	Opponent	Result	Record	Venue	Attendance
1	September 5	Atlanta Falcons	W 30–13	1–0	Pontiac Silverdome	56,216
2	September 12	at New England Patriots	W 19–16 (OT)	2–0	Foxboro Stadium	54,151
3	September 19	at New Orleans Saints	L 3–14	2–1	Louisiana Superdome	69,039
4	September 26	Phoenix Cardinals	W 26–20	3–1	Pontiac Silverdome	57,180
5	October 3	at Tampa Bay Buccaneers	L 10–27	3–2	Tampa Stadium	40,794
6	Bye					
7	October 17	Seattle Seahawks	W 30–10	4–2	Pontiac Silverdome	60,801
8	October 24	at Los Angeles Rams	W 16–13	5–2	Anaheim Stadium	43,850
9	October 31	at Minnesota Vikings	W 30–27	6–2	Hubert H. Humphrey Metrodome	53,428
10	November 7	Tampa Bay Buccaneers	W 23–0	7–2	Pontiac Silverdome	65,295
11	Bye					
12	November 21	at Green Bay Packers	L 17–26	7–3	Milwaukee County Stadium	55,119
13	November 25	Chicago Bears	L 6–10	7–4	Pontiac Silverdome	76,699
14	December 5	Minnesota Vikings	L 0–13	7–5	Pontiac Silverdome	63,216
15	December 12	at Phoenix Cardinals	W 21–14	8–5	Sun Devil Stadium	39,393
16	December 19	San Francisco 49ers	L 17–55	8–6	Pontiac Silverdome	77,052
17	December 26	at Chicago Bears	W 20–14	9–6	Soldier Field	43,443
18	January 2	Green Bay Packers	W 30–20	10–6	Pontiac Silverdome	77,510

== Season summary ==
=== Week 1 ===
Atlanta Falcons at Detroit Lions

Team	1	2	3	4	Total
Falcons	0	3	3	7	13
• Lions	14	10	3	3	30

- Date: Sunday, September 5
- Location: Pontiac Silverdome, Pontiac, Michigan
- Game start: 1:00 p.m. CST
- Game weather: Indoors (dome)

Scoring summary
1	Lions	Barry Sanders 26-yard run (Jason Hanson kick)	Lions 7–0
1	Lions	George Jamison 35-yard interception return (Jason Hanson kick)	Lions 14–0
2	Lions	Jason Hanson 44-yard field goal	Lions 17–0
2	Lions	Herman Moore 21-yard pass from Rodney Peete (Jason Hanson kick)	Lions 24–0
2	Falcons	Norm Johnson 54-yard field goal	Lions 24–3
3	Falcons	Norm Johnson 20-yard field goal	Lions 24–6
3	Lions	Jason Hanson 37-yard field goal	Lions 27–6
4	Falcons	Andre Rison 32-yard pass from Chris Miller (Norm Johnson kick)	Lions 27–13
4	Lions	Jason Hanson 37-yard field goal	Lions 30–13

- Source: Pro-Football-Reference.com

=== Week 4 ===
Team	1	2	3	4	Total
Cardinals	0	17	0	3	20
• Lions	6	10	7	3	26

- Date: September 26
- Location: Pontiac Silverdome
- Game weather: Indoors (dome)

Scoring summary
Q1	13:16	DET	Hanson 44 yard field goal	DET 3–0
Q1	5:57	DET	Hanson 22 yard field goal	DET 6–0
Q2	12:59	PHO	Proehl 51 yard pass from Beuerlein (Davis kick)	PHO 7–6
Q2	10:11	DET	Hanson 33 yard field goal	DET 9–7
Q2	8:43	DET	D. Moore 1 yard run (Hanson kick)	DET 16–7
Q2	1:13	PHO	Reeves 2 yard pass from Beuerlein (Davis kick)	DET 16–14
Q2	0:00	PHO	Davis 54 yard field goal	PHO 17–16
Q3	12:00	DET	Perriman 9 yard pass from Ware (Hanson kick)	DET 23–17
Q4	14:01	PHO	Davis 30 yard field goal	DET 23–20
Q4	8:02	DET	Hanson 38 yard field goal	DET 26–20

== Standings ==
NFC Central
	W	L	T	PCT	PF	PA	STK
^{(3)} Detroit Lions	10	6	0	.625	298	292	W2
^{(5)} Minnesota Vikings	9	7	0	.563	277	290	W3
^{(6)} Green Bay Packers	9	7	0	.563	340	282	L1
Chicago Bears	7	9	0	.438	234	230	L4
Tampa Bay Buccaneers	5	11	0	.313	237	376	L1

== Playoffs ==
Week	Date	Opponent	Result	Attendance
Wild Card	January 8, 1994	Green Bay Packers	L 28–24	68,479

=== NFC Wild Card Game: vs Green Bay Packers ===
NFC Wild Card Game: Green Bay Packers at Detroit Lions – Game summary

Quarter	1	2	3	4	Total
Packers	0	7	14	7	28
Lions	3	7	7	7	24

at Pontiac Silverdome, Pontiac, Michigan

- Date: January 8, 1994
- Game time: 4:00 p.m. EST/3:00 p.m. CST
- Game weather: Played indoors (Dome)
- https://www.pro-football-reference.com/boxscores/199401080det.htm

Game information

First quarter

- DET – Jason Hanson 47 yard field goal. Lions 3–0

Second quarter

- GB – Sterling Sharpe 12 yard pass from Brett Favre (Chris Jacke kick). Packers 7–3
- DET – Brett Perriman 1 yard pass from Erik Kramer. (Jason Hanson kick). Lions 10–7

Third quarter

- DET – Mel Jenkins 15 yard interception return (Jason Hanson kick). Lions 17–7
- GB – Sterling Sharpe 28 yard pass from Brett Favre (Chris Jacke kick). Lions 17–14
- GB – George Teague 101 yard interception return (Chris Jacke kick). Packers 21–17

Fourth quarter

- DET – Derrick Moore 5 yard rush (Jason Hanson kick). Lions 24–21
- GB – Sterling Sharpe 40 yard pass from Brett Favre (Chris Jacke kick). Packers 28–24

Top passers

- GB – Brett Favre – 15/26, 204 yards, 3 TD, 1 INT
- DET – Erik Kramer – 21/31, 248 yards, 1 TD, 2 INT

Top rushers

- GB – Darrell Thompson – 12 rushes, 41 yards
- DET – Barry Sanders – 27 rushes, 169 yards

Top receivers

- GB – Sterling Sharpe – 5 rec, 101 yards, 3 TD
- DET – Brett Perriman – 10 rec, 150 yards, 1 TD

Turnovers

- GB – 1
- DET – 2

== Awards and records ==
- Jason Hanson, Club Record, 34 Field Goals in One Season.
