= 1992 Notre Dame Fighting Irish football team =

American college football season

1992 Notre Dame Fighting Irish football

Cotton Bowl Classic champion

Cotton Bowl Classic, W 28–3 vs. Texas A&M
- Conference: Independent

Ranking
- Coaches: No. 4
- AP: No. 4
- Record: 10–1–1
- Head coach: Lou Holtz (7th season)
- Offensive coordinator: Skip Holtz (1st season)
- Offensive scheme: Multiple
- Defensive coordinator: Rick Minter (1st season)
- Base defense: 4–3
- MVP: Reggie Brooks
- Captains: Demetrius DuBose; Rick Mirer
- Home stadium: Notre Dame Stadium

1992 NCAA Division I-A independents football records
	Conf.			Overall
Team	W	L	T	W		L		T
No. 4 Notre Dame		–		10	–	1	–	1
Southern Miss		–		7	–	4	–	0
Penn State		–		7	–	5	–	0
Memphis State		–		6	–	5	–	0
Army		–		5	–	6	–	0
East Carolina		–		5	–	6	–	0
Louisiana Tech		–		5	–	6	–	0
Louisville		–		5	–	6	–	0
Northern Illinois		–		5	–	6	–	0
Tulsa		–		4	–	7	–	0
Cincinnati		–		3	–	8	–	0
Arkansas State		–		2	–	9	–	0
Southwestern Louisiana		–		2	–	9	–	0
Tulane		–		2	–	9	–	0
Navy		–		1	–	10	–	0
Rankings from AP Poll

The 1992 Notre Dame Fighting Irish football team was an American football team that represented the University of Notre Dame as an independent during the 1992 NCAA Division I-A football season. In their seventh year under head coach Lou Holtz, the Irish compiled a 10–1–1 record, outscored opponents by a total of 409 to 178, and were ranked No. 4 in the final AP and UPI polls. During the regular season, they tied with No. 6 Michigan, lost to No. 18 Stanford, and defeated No. 9 Boston College, No. 22 Penn State, and No. 19 USC. They concluded the season with a victory over No. 4 Texas A&M in the Cotton Bowl.

Guard Aaron Taylor was a consensus first-team pick on the 1992 All-America college football team. The team's statistical leaders included quarterback Rick Mirer (1,876 passing yards), running back Reggie Brooks (1,343 rushing yards), Lake Dawson (25 receptions for 462 yards), and linebacker Demetrius DuBose (87 tackles).

The team played its home games at Notre Dame Stadium in Notre Dame, Indiana.

== Schedule ==
Date	Time	Opponent	Rank	Site	TV	Result	Attendance	Source
September 5	3:30 p.m.	vs. Northwestern	No. 3	Soldier Field; Chicago, IL (rivalry)	ABC	W 42–7	64,877	
September 12	1:30 p.m.	No. 6 Michigan	No. 3	Notre Dame Stadium; Notre Dame, IN (rivalry)	NBC	T 17–17	59,075	
September 19	3:30 p.m.	at Michigan State	No. 7	Spartan Stadium; East Lansing, MI (rivalry)	ABC	W 52–31	76,188	
September 26	1:30 p.m.	Purdue	No. 6	Notre Dame Stadium; Notre Dame, IN (rivalry)	NBC	W 48–0	59,075	
October 3	1:30 p.m.	No. 18 Stanford	No. 6	Notre Dame Stadium; Notre Dame, IN (rivalry)	NBC	L 16–33	59,075	
October 10	7:45 p.m.	at Pittsburgh	No. 13	Pitt Stadium; Pittsburgh, PA (rivalry)	ESPN	W 52–21	52,155	
October 24	1:30 p.m.	BYU	No. 10	Notre Dame Stadium; South Bend, IN	NBC	W 42–16	59,075	
October 31	1:00 p.m.	vs. Navy	No. 10	Giants Stadium; East Rutherford, NJ (rivalry)		W 38–7	58,769	
November 7	1:30 p.m.	No. 9 Boston College	No. 8	Notre Dame Stadium; South Bend, IN (Holy War)	NBC	W 54–7	59,075	
November 14	1:30 p.m.	No. 22 Penn State	No. 8	Notre Dame Stadium; South Bend, IN (rivalry)	NBC	W 17–16	59,075	
November 28	8:00 p.m.	at No. 19 USC	No. 5	Los Angeles Memorial Coliseum; Los Angeles, CA (rivalry)	ABC	W 31–23	90,063	
January 1, 1993	1:00 p.m.	vs. No. 4 Texas A&M	No. 5	Cotton Bowl; Dallas, TX (Cotton Bowl Classic)	NBC	W 28–3	71,615	
Rankings from AP Poll released prior to the game; All times are in Eastern time; Source:

== Game summaries ==
=== At Northwestern ===
Team	1	2	3	4	Total
• Fighting Irish	7	7	14	14	42
Wildcats	7	0	0	0	7

- Date: October 31
- Location: Soldier Field, Chicago, IL

Scoring summary
Q1	6:12	ND	McBride 5 yard pass from Mirer (PAT)	ND 7–0
Q1	0:47	NW	Gissendaner 14 yard run (PAT)	NW 7–7
Q2	1:54	ND	Becton 2 yard run (PAT)	ND 14–7
Q3	5:47	ND	Miller 70 yard pass from Mirer (PAT)	ND 21—7
Q3	1:48	ND	Bettis 24 yard run (PAT)	ND 28–7
Q4	6:47	ND	Brooks 72 yard run (PAT)	ND 35–7
Q4	3:27	ND	McBride 5 yard pass from McDougal (PAT)	ND 42–7

=== Navy ===
Notre Dame vs. Navy

Team	1	2	3	4	Total
• Fighting Irish	7	24	0	7	38
Midshipmen	0	0	0	7	7

- Date: October 31
- Location: Giants Stadium, East Rutherford, NJ
- Game attendance: 58,769

Scoring summary
Q1	ND	Burns 5 yard run (Hentrich kick)	ND 7–0
Q2	ND	Hentrich 32 yard field goal	ND 10–0
Q2	ND	Brooks 24 yard pass from Mirer (Hentrich kick)	ND 17–0
Q2	ND	Brooks 4 yard run (Hentrich kick)	ND 24—0
Q2	ND	Smith 3 yard pass from Mirer (Hentrich kick)	ND 31–0
Q4	NAVY	Pritchard 22 yard pass from Van Matre (Rogers kick)	ND 31–7
Q4	ND	Becton 9 yard run (Pendergast kick)	ND 38–7

=== Boston College ===
Game footage from the final scene of the 1993 film Rudy was shot at halftime.

=== Penn State ===
Team	1	2	3	4	Total
Penn State	6	0	0	10	16
• Notre Dame	3	3	3	8	17

- Date: November 14
- Location: Notre Dame Stadium, South Bend, IN
- Game attendance: 59,075
- TV announcers (NBC): Tom Hammond (play by play), Cris Collinsworth (color), and John Dockery (sideline)

Scoring summary
1	ND	Hentrich 26 yard field goal	ND 3-0
1	PSU	Anderson 1 yard run (kick failed)	PSU 6-3
2	ND	Hentrich 31 yard field goal	Tied 6-6
3	ND	Hentrich 37 yard field goal	ND 9-6
4	PSU	Muscillo 22 yard field goal	Tied 9-9
4	PSU	O'Neal 13 yard run (Muscillo kick)	PSU 16-9
4	ND	Bettis 3 yard pass from Mirer (Mirer to Brooks pass)	ND 17-16

With snowfall starting early in the game, heavy during the first half, this game has been nicknamed the "Snow Bowl".

=== Cotton Bowl ===
Team	1	2	3	4	Total
• Fighting Irish	0	7	14	7	28
Aggies	0	0	0	3	3

- Date: January 1
- Location: Cotton Bowl, Dallas, TX
- Game attendance: 71,615
- TV announcers (NBC): Tom Hammond and Paul Maguire

== Roster ==
1992 Notre Dame Fighting Irish football team roster
Players
Coaches
Offense

Pos.	#	Name	Class
FB	6	Jerome Bettis	Jr
RB	40	Reggie Brooks	Sr
TE	98	Pete Chryplewicz	Fr
RB	37	Travis Davis	So
WR	87	Lake Dawson	Jr
OT	65	Lindsay Knapp	Sr
TE	80	Oscar McBride	Jr
QB	15	Kevin McDougal	Jr
WR	1	Derrick Mayes	Fr
QB	3	Rick Mirer	Sr
OT	68	Jeff Riney	So
C	61	Tim Ruddy	Jr
TE	84	Irv Smith Sr.	Sr
OT	75	Aaron Taylor	Jr
RB	34	Ray Zellars	So

Defense

Pos.	#	Name	Class
LB	41	Joe Babey	Fr
LB	47	Pete Bercich	Jr
DT	95	Junior Bryant
S	9	Jeff Burris	Jr
CB	13	Tom Carter	Jr
CB	32	Willie Clark	Jr
CB	29	John Covington	Jr
LB	31	Demetrius DuBose	Sr
DT	44	Jim Flanigan	Jr
DT	93	Paul Grasmanis	Fr
DT	55	Oliver Gibson	Jr
FS	25	Mike Lalli	Sr
LB	89	Karmeeleyah McGill	Sr
LB	46	Brian Ratigan	Sr
DE	30	Nick Smith	Sr
CB	21	Bobby Taylor	Fr
DE	48	Renaldo Wynn	So
DE	97	Bryant Young	Jr

Special teams

Pos.	#	Name	Class
P	28	Craig Hentrich	Sr

Head coach

- Lou Holtz

Coordinators/assistant coaches

- Todd Monken (graduate assistant)

Legend

- (C) Team captain
- (S) Suspended
- (I) Ineligible
- Injured
- Redshirt

== Awards and honors ==
Tailback Reggie Brooks, who led the team with 1,343 rushing yards, an average of 8.0 yards per carry, and 84 points scored, was selected as the team's most valuable player. He also finished fifth in voting for the Heisman Trophy. He was also one of three finalists for the Doak Walker Award and received second-team honors on the 1992 All-America college football team.

Linebacker Demetrius DuBose won the Nick Pietrosante Award by vote of his teammates.

Quarterback Rick Mirer was selected as a second-team All-American by Football News. He was also a finalist for both the Johnny Unitas Golden Arm Award and the Davey O'Brien Award.

Former Fighting Irish player Jim Lynch was inducted into the College Football Hall of Fame 84 points scored,

== 1993 NFL draft ==
The following Notre Dame players were selected in the 1993 NFL draft.

Player	Position	Round	Pick	NFL club
Rick Mirer	Quarterback	1	2	Seattle Seahawks
Jerome Bettis	Running back	1	10	Los Angeles Rams
Tom Carter	Cornerback	1	17	Washington Redskins
Irv Smith	Tight end	1	20	New Orleans Saints
Demetrius DuBose	Linebacker	2	34	Tampa Bay Buccaneers
Reggie Brooks	Running Back	2	45	Washington Redskins
Devon McDonald	Linebacker	4	107	Indianapolis Colts
Lindsay Knapp	Guard	5	130	Kansas City Chiefs
Craig Hentrich	Kicker	8	200	New York Jets
