= 1992 Memphis State Tigers football team =

American college football season

1992 Memphis State Tigers football
- Conference: Independent
- Record: 6–5
- Head coach: Chuck Stobart (4th season)
- Defensive coordinator: Tim Rose (1st season)
- Home stadium: Liberty Bowl Memorial Stadium

1992 NCAA Division I-A independents football records
	Conf.			Overall
Team	W	L	T	W		L		T
No. 4 Notre Dame		–		10	–	1	–	1
Southern Miss		–		7	–	4	–	0
Penn State		–		7	–	5	–	0
Memphis State		–		6	–	5	–	0
Army		–		5	–	6	–	0
East Carolina		–		5	–	6	–	0
Louisiana Tech		–		5	–	6	–	0
Louisville		–		5	–	6	–	0
Northern Illinois		–		5	–	6	–	0
Tulsa		–		4	–	7	–	0
Cincinnati		–		3	–	8	–	0
Arkansas State		–		2	–	9	–	0
Southwestern Louisiana		–		2	–	9	–	0
Tulane		–		2	–	9	–	0
Navy		–		1	–	10	–	0
Rankings from AP Poll

The 1992 Memphis State Tigers football team represented Memphis State University (now known as the University of Memphis) in the 1992 NCAA Division I-A football season. The team was led by head coach Chuck Stobart. The Tigers played their home games at the Liberty Bowl Memorial Stadium.

== Schedule ==
Date	Opponent	Site	Result	Attendance	Source
September 5	at Southern Miss	M. M. Roberts Stadium; Hattiesburg, MS (Black and Blue Bowl)	L 21–23	16,059	
September 12	at Louisville	Cardinal Stadium; Louisville, KY (rivalry)	L 15–16	37,192	
September 19	No. 24 Mississippi State	Liberty Bowl Memorial Stadium; Memphis, TN	L 16–20	40,067	
September 26	Arkansas	Liberty Bowl Memorial Stadium; Memphis, TN	W 22–6	38,968	
October 10	Cincinnati^{†}	Liberty Bowl Memorial Stadium; Memphis, TN (rivalry)	W 34–14	39,731	
October 17	Arkansas State	Liberty Bowl Memorial Stadium; Memphis, TN (Paint Bucket Bowl)	W 37–7	23,104	
October 24	at Tulsa	Skelly Stadium; Tulsa, OK	W 30–25	20,142	
October 31	at Tulane	Louisiana Superdome; New Orleans, LA	W 62–20	20,936	
November 7	at Ole Miss	Vaught–Hemingway Stadium; Oxford, MS (rivalry)	L 12–17	42,847	
November 14	No. 23 Tennessee	Liberty Bowl Memorial Stadium; Memphis, TN	L 21–26	65,234	
November 21	East Carolina	Liberty Bowl Memorial Stadium; Memphis, TN	W 42–7	17,345	
^{†}Homecoming; Rankings from AP Poll released prior to the game

== Roster ==
1992 Memphis State Tigers football team roster
Players
Coaches
Offense

Pos.	#	Name	Class
WR	3	Russell Copeland	Jr
WR	10	Mac Cody	So
QB	11	Steve Matthews	Jr
OT	67	Tony Semple	Jr
WR	83	Isaac Bruce	Jr

Defense

Pos.	#	Name	Class
DB	29	Ken Irvin	So

Special teams

Pos.	#	Name	Class
K	12	Joe Allison	Jr

Head coach

- Chuck Stobart

Coordinators/assistant coaches

Legend

- (C) Team captain
- (S) Suspended
- (I) Ineligible
- Injured
- Redshirt
