= 1992 Boston College Eagles football team =

American college football season

1992 Boston College Eagles football

Hall of Fame Bowl, L 23–38 vs. Tennessee
- Conference: Big East Conference

Ranking
- Coaches: No. 21
- AP: No. 21
- Record: 8–3–1 (2–1–1 Big East)
- Head coach: Tom Coughlin (2nd season)
- Offensive coordinator: Tom Coughlin (2nd season)
- Defensive coordinator: Steve Szabo (2nd season)
- Captain: Game captains
- Home stadium: Alumni Stadium

1992 Big East Conference football standings
	Conf.					Overall
Team	W		L		T	W		L		T
No. 3 Miami (FL)	4	–	0	–	0	11	–	1	–	0
No. 6 Syracuse	6	–	1	–	0	10	–	2	–	0
Rutgers	4	–	2	–	0	7	–	4	–	0
No. 21 Boston College	2	–	1	–	1	8	–	3	–	1
West Virginia	2	–	3	–	1	5	–	4	–	2
Pittsburgh	1	–	3	–	0	3	–	9	–	0
Virginia Tech	1	–	4	–	0	2	–	8	–	1
Temple	0	–	6	–	0	1	–	10	–	0
The Big East did not crown an official champion until 1993 when full league play began.; Rankings from AP Poll

The 1992 Boston College Eagles football team represented Boston College in the 1992 NCAA Division I-A football season. The Eagles were led by second-year head coach Tom Coughlin, and played their home games at Alumni Stadium in Chestnut Hill, Massachusetts. They competed as members of the Big East Conference, playing a limited conference schedule in the league's second year of football. Boston College was invited to play in the 1993 Hall of Fame Bowl, where they lost to Tennessee, 23–38.

== Schedule ==
Date	Opponent	Rank	Site	TV	Result	Attendance	Source
September 5	Rutgers		Alumni Stadium; Chestnut Hill, MA		W 37–20	29,110	
September 12	Northwestern*		Alumni Stadium; Chestnut Hill, MA		W 49–0	28,888	
September 19	Navy*		Alumni Stadium; Chestnut Hill, MA		W 28–0	32,116	
September 26	Michigan State*	No. 25	Alumni Stadium; Chestnut Hill, MA		W 14–0	32,498	
October 3	at West Virginia	No. 22	Mountaineer Field; Morgantown, WV		T 24–24	55,643	
October 17	at No. 9 Penn State*	No. 20	Beaver Stadium; University Park, PA		W 35–32	96,130	
October 24	at Tulane*	No. 11	Louisiana Superdome; New Orleans, LA		W 17–13	25,646	
October 31	Temple	No. 11	Alumni Stadium; Chestnut Hill, MA		W 45–6	32,812	
November 7	at No. 8 Notre Dame*	No. 9	Notre Dame Stadium; Notre Dame, IN (Holy War)		L 7–54	59,075	
November 14	No. 10 Syracuse	No. 17	Alumni Stadium; Chestnut Hill, MA		L 10–27	33,298	
November 21	at Army*	No. 19	Michie Stadium; West Point, NY		W 41–24	35,726	
January 1, 1993	vs. No. 17 Tennessee*	No. 16	Tampa Stadium; Tampa, FL (Hall of Fame Bowl)	ESPN	L 23–38	52,056	
*Non-conference game; Rankings from AP Poll released prior to the game

== Roster ==
1992 Boston College Eagles football team roster
Players
Coaches
Offense

Pos.	#	Name	Class
QB	13	Glenn Foley	Jr
RB	30	David Green	So
G	66	Pete Kendall	Fr
TE	88	Gordon Laro	So
TE	82	Pete Mitchell	So
C	64	Tom Nalen	Jr
QB	8	Jeff Ryan	Fr
OT	67	Ron Stone	Sr

Defense

Pos.	#	Name	Class
FS	28	Charlie Brennan	Sr
LB	50	Stephen Boyd	So
LB	91	Dan Kerr	Jr
DT	75	Nelson Long	Jr
DE	59	Mike Mamula	Fr
LB	53	Tom McManus	Sr
DB	17	Michael Reed	So
DE	93	Chris Sullivan	Fr

Special teams

Pos.	#	Name	Class

Head coach

- Tom Coughlin

Coordinators/assistant coaches

- Gary Crowton (Quarterbacks)

Legend

- (C) Team captain
- (S) Suspended
- (I) Ineligible
- Injured
- Redshirt
