= 1992 Northern Illinois Huskies football team =

American college football season

1992 Northern Illinois Huskies football
- Conference: Independent
- Record: 5–6
- Head coach: Charlie Sadler (2nd season)
- Captains: Brad Capes; Rob Wagner; Larry Wynn
- Home stadium: Huskie Stadium

1992 NCAA Division I-A independents football records
	Conf.			Overall
Team	W	L	T	W		L		T
No. 4 Notre Dame		–		10	–	1	–	1
Southern Miss		–		7	–	4	–	0
Penn State		–		7	–	5	–	0
Memphis State		–		6	–	5	–	0
Army		–		5	–	6	–	0
East Carolina		–		5	–	6	–	0
Louisiana Tech		–		5	–	6	–	0
Louisville		–		5	–	6	–	0
Northern Illinois		–		5	–	6	–	0
Tulsa		–		4	–	7	–	0
Cincinnati		–		3	–	8	–	0
Arkansas State		–		2	–	9	–	0
Southwestern Louisiana		–		2	–	9	–	0
Tulane		–		2	–	9	–	0
Navy		–		1	–	10	–	0
Rankings from AP Poll

The 1992 Northern Illinois Huskies football team represented Northern Illinois University as an independent during the 1992 NCAA Division I-A football season. Led by second-year head coach Charlie Sadler, the Huskies compiled a record of 5–6. Northern Illinois played home games at Huskie Stadium in DeKalb, Illinois.

== Schedule ==
Date	Time	Opponent	Site	TV	Result	Attendance	Source
September 5	1:00 pm	at Illinois	Memorial Stadium; Champaign, IL		L 14–30	50,015	
September 12	6:30 pm	Illinois State	Huskie Stadium; DeKalb, IL		W 26–19	13,302	
September 19		at Arkansas State	Indian Stadium; Jonesboro, AR		W 31–0	12,700	
September 26	1:05 pm	at Wisconsin	Camp Randall Stadium; Madison, WI		L 17–18	50,688	
October 3	6:30 pm	Middle Tennessee State	Huskie Stadium; DeKalb, IL		L 13–21	12,632	
October 10	1:00 pm	Southern Miss^{†}	Huskie Stadium; DeKalb, IL	SCC	W 23–10	14,246	
October 24	1:00 pm	Liberty	Huskie Stadium; DeKalb, IL		W 27–21	12,105	
October 31		at Western Michigan	Waldo Stadium; Kalamazoo, MI		L 7–13	14,125	
November 7		at Southwestern Louisiana	Cajun Field; Lafayette, LA		W 23–15	19,183	
November 14		at Army	Michie Stadium; West Point, NY		L 14–21	32,391	
November 21	1:00 pm	Toledo*	Huskie Stadium; DeKalb, IL	SCC	L 8–25	5,220	
*Non-conference game; ^{†}Homecoming; All times are in Central time; Source:
