= 1992 Syracuse Orangemen football team =

American college football season

1992 Syracuse Orangemen football

Fiesta Bowl champion Lambert-Meadowlands Trophy

Fiesta Bowl, W 26–22 vs. Colorado
- Conference: Big East Conference

Ranking
- Coaches: No. 7
- AP: No. 6
- Record: 10–2 (6–1 Big East)
- Head coach: Paul Pasqualoni (2nd season)
- Offensive coordinator: George DeLeone (6th season)
- Defensive coordinator: Kevin Coyle (2nd season)
- Captains: David Walker; Glen Young
- Home stadium: Carrier Dome

1992 Big East Conference football standings
	Conf.					Overall
Team	W		L		T	W		L		T
No. 3 Miami (FL)	4	–	0	–	0	11	–	1	–	0
No. 6 Syracuse	6	–	1	–	0	10	–	2	–	0
Rutgers	4	–	2	–	0	7	–	4	–	0
No. 21 Boston College	2	–	1	–	1	8	–	3	–	1
West Virginia	2	–	3	–	1	5	–	4	–	2
Pittsburgh	1	–	3	–	0	3	–	9	–	0
Virginia Tech	1	–	4	–	0	2	–	8	–	1
Temple	0	–	6	–	0	1	–	10	–	0
The Big East did not crown an official champion until 1993 when full league play began.; Rankings from AP Poll

The 1992 Syracuse Orangemen football team represented Syracuse University as a member of the Big East Conference during the 1992 NCAA Division I-A football season. Led by second-year head coach Paul Pasqualoni, the Orangemen compiled an overall record of 10–2 with a mark of 6–1 in conference play. Syracuse was invited to the Fiesta Bowl, where the Orangemen defeated Colorado. Ranked sixth in the final AP poll, Syracuse was awarded the Lambert-Meadowlands Trophy, signifying them as champions of the East. To date, this season is the last time that Syracuse won the award and the program's last top-ten finish. The team played home games at the Carrier Dome in Syracuse, New York.

== Schedule ==
Date	Time	Opponent	Rank	Site	TV	Result	Attendance	Source
September 5	7:00 pm	at East Carolina*	No. 10	Ficklen Memorial Stadium; Greenville, NC		W 42–21	36,500	
September 12	3:30 pm	Texas*	No. 9	Carrier Dome; Syracuse, NY	ABC	W 31–21	49,238	
September 19	6:30 pm	No. 21 Ohio State*	No. 8	Carrier Dome; Syracuse, NY	ESPN	L 12–35	49,629	
October 3	4:00 pm	at Louisville*	No. 17	Cardinal Stadium; Louisville, KY		W 15–9	37,323	
October 10	12:00 pm	Rutgers	No. 15	Carrier Dome; Syracuse, NY	BEN	W 50–28	49,194	
October 17	12:00 pm	at No. 24 West Virginia	No. 14	Mountaineer Field; Morgantown, WV (rivalry)	BEN	W 20–17	52,627	
October 24	12:00 pm	at Temple	No. 12	Veterans Stadium; Philadelphia, PA		W 38–7	11,221	
October 31	12:00 pm	Pittsburgh	No. 12	Carrier Dome; Syracuse, NY (rivalry)	BEN	W 41–10	48,837	
November 7	12:00 pm	Virginia Tech	No. 10	Carrier Dome; Syracuse, NY	BEN	W 28–9	49,196	
November 14	3:30 pm	at No. 17 Boston College	No. 10	Alumni Stadium; Chestnut Hill, MA	ABC	W 27–10	33,298	
November 21	3:30 pm	No. 1 Miami (FL)	No. 8	Carrier Dome; Syracuse, NY	ABC	L 10–16	49,857	
January 1	3:30 pm	vs. No. 10 Colorado*	No. 6	Sun Devil Stadium; Tempe, AZ (Fiesta Bowl)	NBC	W 26–22	70,224	
*Non-conference game; Rankings from AP Poll released prior to the game; All times are in Eastern time; Source:

== Roster ==
1992 Syracuse Orangemen football team roster
Players
Coaches
Offense

Pos.	#	Name	Class
OT	79	Kyle Adams	Jr
RB	42	Kirby Dar Dar	So
WR	82	Kerry Ferrell	Sr
TE	84	Chris Gedney	Sr
QB	5	Marvin Graves	Sr
WR	8	Marvin Harrison	Fr
WR	12	Shelby Hill	Jr
WR	45	Qadry Ismail	Sr
FB	32	Marcus Lee	Jr
RB	44	Terry Richardson	Jr
LT	74	Melvin Tuten	So
RB	33	David Walker	Sr
C	55	Dave Wohlabaugh	So
FB	38	Al Wooten	Jr
WR	80	Antonio Johnson	Sr

Defense

Pos.	#	Name	Class
CB	26	Ousmaue Bary	Sr
DE	98	Ernie Brown	Jr
LB	51	Matt Greco	Sr
SS	27	Bob Grosvenor	Jr
FS	18	Tony Jones	So
CB	9	Dwayne Joseph	Jr
LB	52	Glen Young	Sr

Special teams

Pos.	#	Name	Class
K	1	John Biskup	Sr
P	4	Pat O'Neill	Jr

Head coach

- Paul Pasqualoni

Coordinators/assistant coaches

Legend

- (C) Team captain
- (S) Suspended
- (I) Ineligible
- Injured
- Redshirt
