= 1992 Pittsburgh Panthers football team =

American college football season

1992 Pittsburgh Panthers football
- Conference: Big East Conference
- Record: 3–9 (1–3 Big East)
- Head coach: Paul Hackett (3rd season; first 11 games); Sal Sunseri (interim, final game)
- Offensive coordinator: Bill Meyers (3rd season)
- Offensive scheme: Multiple pro-style
- Defensive coordinator: Nick Rapone (1st season)
- Base defense: Multiple, 3–4 base
- Home stadium: Pitt Stadium

1992 Big East Conference football standings
	Conf.					Overall
Team	W		L		T	W		L		T
No. 3 Miami (FL)	4	–	0	–	0	11	–	1	–	0
No. 6 Syracuse	6	–	1	–	0	10	–	2	–	0
Rutgers	4	–	2	–	0	7	–	4	–	0
No. 21 Boston College	2	–	1	–	1	8	–	3	–	1
West Virginia	2	–	3	–	1	5	–	4	–	2
Pittsburgh	1	–	3	–	0	3	–	9	–	0
Virginia Tech	1	–	4	–	0	2	–	8	–	1
Temple	0	–	6	–	0	1	–	10	–	0
The Big East did not crown an official champion until 1993 when full league play began.; Rankings from AP Poll

The 1992 Pittsburgh Panthers football team represented the University of Pittsburgh in the 1992 NCAA Division I-A football season.

== Schedule ==
Date	Time	Opponent	Site	TV	Result	Attendance	Source
September 5	7:00 p.m.	Kent State*	Pitt Stadium; Pittsburgh, PA		W 51–10	31,284	
September 12	12:00 p.m.	West Virginia	Pitt Stadium; Pittsburgh, PA (Backyard Brawl)	Big East	L 6–44	41,723	
September 17	8:00 p.m.	at Rutgers	Rutgers Stadium; Piscataway, NJ	ESPN	L 16–21	26,017	
September 26	1:30 p.m.	Minnesota*	Pitt Stadium; Pittsburgh, PA		W 41–33	31,129	
October 3	1:00 p.m.	at Maryland*	Byrd Stadium; College Park, MD		L 34–47	35,891	
October 10	7:30 p.m.	No. 13 Notre Dame*	Pitt Stadium; Pittsburgh, PA (rivalry)	ESPN	L 21–52	52,155	
October 17	12:00 p.m.	at Temple	Veterans Stadium; Philadelphia, PA		W 27–20	17,470	
October 24	1:30 p.m.	East Carolina*^{†}	Pitt Stadium; Pittsburgh, PA		L 31–37	25,766	
October 31	12:00 p.m.	at No. 12 Syracuse	Carrier Dome; Syracuse, NY (rivalry)	Big East	L 10–41	48,837	
November 14	1:30 p.m.	Louisville*	Pitt Stadium; Pittsburgh, PA		L 16–31	14,065	
November 21	4:30 p.m.	at No. 23 Penn State*	Beaver Stadium; University Park, PA (rivalry)	ESPN	L 13–57	91,000	
December 5	11:00 p.m.	at Hawaii*	Aloha Stadium; Halawa, HI	WTAE	L 23–36	46,281	
*Non-conference game; ^{†}Homecoming; Rankings from AP Poll released prior to the game; All times are in Eastern time; Source:

== Personnel ==
=== Roster ===
1992 Pittsburgh Panthers football team roster
Players
Coaches
Offense

Pos.	#	Name	Class
G	78	Ruben Brown	So
TE	81	Rob Coons	Sr
WR	49	Billy Davis	Jr
WR	26	Dietrich Jells	So
RB	29	Curtis Martin	So
WR	47	Cliff Moncrief	Sr
QB	14	John Ryan	So
QB	10	Alex Van Pelt	Sr

Defense

Pos.	#	Name	Class
DT	90	Tom Barndt	So
DB	12	Anthony Dorsett	So
DB	42	Vernon Lewis	Sr
DL	98	Mike Mohring	Fr
LB	84	Tom Tumulty	So

Special teams

Pos.	#	Name	Class

Head coach

- Sal Sunseri

Coordinators/assistant coaches

Legend

- (C) Team captain
- (S) Suspended
- (I) Ineligible
- Injured
- Redshirt

=== Coaching staff ===
1992 Pittsburgh Panthers football staff
Coaching staff: Paul Hackett – Head coach; Sal Sunseri – Assistant head coach/inside linebackers; Bill Meyers – Offensive coordinator/offensive line; Nick Rapone– Defensive coordinator/secondary; Michael McCarthy – Wide receivers; Amos Jones – Special teams/defensive assistant; Jim Miceli – Tight ends; Skip Peete – Running backs; Chris Petersen – Quarterbacks; Tom Turchetta – Defensive line; Brian Williams – Outside linebackers	Support staff: Alex Kramer – Administrative assistant; Larry Petroff – Recruiting coordinator	Strength and conditioning staff: Tim Wilson – Strength and conditioning Coach

== Team players drafted into the NFL ==
Player	Position	Round	Pick	NFL club
Alex Van Pelt	Quarterback	8	216	Pittsburgh Steelers
