= 1992 Army Cadets football team =

American college football season

1992 Army Cadets football
- Conference: Independent
- Record: 5–6
- Head coach: Bob Sutton (2nd season)
- Offensive coordinator: Greg Gregory (4th as OC; 11th overall season)
- Offensive scheme: Triple option
- Defensive coordinator: Denny Doornbos (2nd season)
- Base defense: 4–3
- Captains: Dan Davis; Mike McElrath
- Home stadium: Michie Stadium

1992 NCAA Division I-A independents football records
	Conf.			Overall
Team	W	L	T	W		L		T
No. 4 Notre Dame		–		10	–	1	–	1
Southern Miss		–		7	–	4	–	0
Penn State		–		7	–	5	–	0
Memphis State		–		6	–	5	–	0
Army		–		5	–	6	–	0
East Carolina		–		5	–	6	–	0
Louisiana Tech		–		5	–	6	–	0
Louisville		–		5	–	6	–	0
Northern Illinois		–		5	–	6	–	0
Tulsa		–		4	–	7	–	0
Cincinnati		–		3	–	8	–	0
Arkansas State		–		2	–	9	–	0
Southwestern Louisiana		–		2	–	9	–	0
Tulane		–		2	–	9	–	0
Navy		–		1	–	10	–	0
Rankings from AP Poll

The 1992 Army Cadets football team was an American football team that represented the United States Military Academy as an independent during the 1992 NCAA Division I-A football season. In their second season under head coach Bob Sutton, the Cadets compiled a 5–6 record and were outscored by their opponents by a total of 251 to 225. In the annual Army–Navy Game, the Cadets defeated Navy, 25–24.

== Schedule ==
Date	Time	Opponent	Site	Result	Attendance	Source
September 12		No. 18 (I–AA) Holy Cross	Michie Stadium; West Point, NY	W 17–7	32,736	
September 19		at North Carolina	Kenan Memorial Stadium; Chapel Hill, NC	L 9–22	40,500	
September 26	1:30 p.m.	No. 5 (I–AA) The Citadel	Michie Stadium; West Point, NY	L 14–15	37,692	
October 10		Lafayette	Michie Stadium; West Point, NY	W 38–36	39,642	
October 17		at Rutgers	Giants Stadium; East Rutherford, NJ	L 10–45	22,164	
October 24	1:00 p.m.	at Wake Forest	Groves Stadium; Winston-Salem, NC	L 7–23	18,221	
October 31		Eastern Michigan	Michie Stadium; West Point, NY	W 57–17	26,179	
November 7		Air Force	Michie Stadium; West Point, NY (Commander-in-Chief's Trophy)	L 3–7	40,675	
November 14		Northern Illinois	Michie Stadium; West Point, NY	W 21–14	32,391	
November 21		Boston College	Michie Stadium; West Point, NY	L 24–41	35,726	
December 5		vs. Navy	Veterans Stadium; Philadelphia, PA (Army–Navy Game)	W 25–24	65,207	
Rankings from NCAA Division I-AA Football Committee Poll released prior to the game; All times are in Eastern time

== Game summaries ==
=== Lafayette ===
External videos
- Army highlights

=== Eastern Michigan ===
External videos
- Army highlights

=== vs Navy ===
Army Cadets (5–5) vs. Navy Midshipmen

Quarter	1	2	Total
Army			0
Navy			0

at Veterans Stadium • Philadelphia, Pennsylvania

- Date: December 5
- Referee: John Soffey
- TV announcers (CBS): Brent Musburger, Dick Vermeil, and Jack Arute
- Washington Post

Scoring summary

Quarter	Time	Drive			Team	Scoring information	Score	
Quarter	Time	Plays	Yards	TOP	Team	Scoring information	ARMY	NAVY
1		11	80		Navy	Ingraham -yard touchdown run, kick good	0	7
3					Navy	Pritchard 24-yard touchdown reception from Van Matre, kick good	7	24
3		1	22		Army	Roper 22-yard touchdown run, Malcolm kick good	14	24
4					Army	Greene 68-yard touchdown reception from Roper, 2-point run good	22	24
4	0:12				Army	49-yard field goal by Malcolm	25	24
"TOP" = time of possession. For other American football terms, see Glossary of American football.							25	24

External videos
- Game highlights (Part 1)
- Game highlights (Part 2)

== Roster ==
1992 Army Cadets football team roster
Players
Coaches
Offense

Pos.	#	Name	Class
		Paul Andrzejewski
		Steve Carpenter
		Gaylord Greene
QB		Rick Roper

Defense

Pos.	#	Name	Class
LB		Thomas Burrell	Fr
		Dan Davis
NG		Gary Graves
DL		Sean Gladieux

Special teams

Pos.	#	Name	Class
K	3	Patmon Malcolm	Sr

Head coach

- Bob Sutton

Coordinators/assistant coaches

Legend

- (C) Team captain
- (S) Suspended
- (I) Ineligible
- Injured
- Redshirt

- Not listed (missing number/class/position): Aaron Mitchell, Chris Shaw (holder)
