= 1992 East Carolina Pirates football team =

American college football season

1992 East Carolina Pirates football
- Conference: Independent
- Record: 5–6
- Head coach: Steve Logan (1st season)
- Offensive coordinator: Todd Berry (1st season)
- Offensive scheme: Pro-style
- Defensive coordinator: Chris Thurmond (1st season)
- Base defense: 4–3
- Home stadium: Ficklen Memorial Stadium

1992 NCAA Division I-A independents football records
	Conf.			Overall
Team	W	L	T	W		L		T
No. 4 Notre Dame		–		10	–	1	–	1
Southern Miss		–		7	–	4	–	0
Penn State		–		7	–	5	–	0
Memphis State		–		6	–	5	–	0
Army		–		5	–	6	–	0
East Carolina		–		5	–	6	–	0
Louisiana Tech		–		5	–	6	–	0
Louisville		–		5	–	6	–	0
Northern Illinois		–		5	–	6	–	0
Tulsa		–		4	–	7	–	0
Cincinnati		–		3	–	8	–	0
Arkansas State		–		2	–	9	–	0
Southwestern Louisiana		–		2	–	9	–	0
Tulane		–		2	–	9	–	0
Navy		–		1	–	10	–	0
Rankings from AP Poll

The 1992 East Carolina Pirates football team was an American football team that represented East Carolina University as an independent during the 1992 NCAA Division I-A football season. In their first season under head coach Steve Logan, the team compiled a 5–6 record.

== Schedule ==
Date	Time	Opponent	Site	TV	Result	Attendance	Source
September 5	7:00 pm	No. 10 Syracuse	Ficklen Memorial Stadium; Greenville, NC		L 21–42	36,500	
September 12	12:00 pm	Virginia Tech	Ficklen Memorial Stadium; Greenville, NC	PSNTV	W 30–27	35,121	
September 19	7:00 pm	at South Carolina	Williams–Brice Stadium; Columbia, SC		W 20–18	60,030	
September 26	12:30 pm	at Bowling Green	Doyt Perry Stadium; Bowling Green, OH		L 34–44	12,512	
October 10	1:30 pm	at Duke	Wallace Wade Stadium; Durham, NC		L 14–45	34,100	
October 17	2:00 pm	Cincinnati^{†}	Ficklen Memorial Stadium; Greenville, NC		W 42–21	34,126	
October 24	1:30 pm	at Pittsburgh	Pitt Stadium; Pittsburgh, PA		W 37–31	25,766	
October 29	8:00 pm	Southern Miss	Ficklen Memorial Stadium; Greenville, NC	ESPN	L 21–38	33,249	
November 7	1:00 pm	at West Virginia	Mountaineer Field; Morgantown, WV		L 28–41	41,139	
November 14	2:00 pm	Arkansas State	Ficklen Memorial Stadium; Greenville, NC		W 35–18	25,072	
November 21	2:30 pm	at Memphis State	Liberty Bowl; Memphis, TN		L 7–42	17,345	
^{†}Homecoming; Rankings from AP Poll released prior to the game; All times are in Eastern time
