= 1992 Temple Owls football team =

American college football season

1992 Temple Owls football
- Conference: Big East Conference
- Record: 1–10 (0–6 Big East)
- Head coach: Jerry Berndt (4th season)
- Home stadium: Veterans Stadium

1992 Big East Conference football standings
| | Conf. | | | | | Overall |
| Team | W | | L | | T | W | | L | | T |
|---|---|---|---|---|---|---|---|---|---|---|
| No. 3 Miami (FL) | 4 | – | 0 | – | 0 | 11 | – | 1 | – | 0 |
| No. 6 Syracuse | 6 | – | 1 | – | 0 | 10 | – | 2 | – | 0 |
| Rutgers | 4 | – | 2 | – | 0 | 7 | – | 4 | – | 0 |
| No. 21 Boston College | 2 | – | 1 | – | 1 | 8 | – | 3 | – | 1 |
| West Virginia | 2 | – | 3 | – | 1 | 5 | – | 4 | – | 2 |
| Pittsburgh | 1 | – | 3 | – | 0 | 3 | – | 9 | – | 0 |
| Virginia Tech | 1 | – | 4 | – | 0 | 2 | – | 8 | – | 1 |
| Temple | 0 | – | 6 | – | 0 | 1 | – | 10 | – | 0 |
The Big East did not crown an official champion until 1993 when full league play began.; Rankings from AP Poll

The 1992 Temple Owls football team represented Temple University as a member of the Big East Conference during the 1992 NCAA Division I-A football season. Led by Jerry Berndt in his fourth and final season as head coach, the Owls compiled an overall record of 1–10 with a mark of 0–6 in conference play, placing last out of eight teams in the Big East. Temple played home games at Veterans Stadium in Philadelphia.

== Schedule ==
| Date | Time | Opponent | Site | TV | Result | Attendance | Source |
|---|---|---|---|---|---|---|---|
| September 5 | 7:00 pm | vs. Boston University* | Hersheypark Stadium; Hershey, PA | | W 35–0 | 8,612 | |
| September 12 | 1:00 pm | at No. 10 Penn State* | Beaver Stadium; University Park, PA | | L 8–49 | 94,892 | |
| September 19 | 12:00 pm | Virginia Tech | Veterans Stadium; Philadelphia, PA | ESPN Plus | L 7–26 | 11,861 | |
| September 26 | 7:30 pm | at Kansas State* | KSU Stadium; Manhattan, KS | | L 14–35 | 28,833 | |
| October 3 | 5:00 pm | at Washington State* | Martin Stadium; Pullman, WA | | L 10–51 | 21,861 | |
| October 17 | 12:00 pm | Pittsburgh | Veterans Stadium; Philadelphia, PA | | L 20–27 | 17,470 | |
| October 24 | 12:00 pm | No. 12 Syracuse | Veterans Stadium; Philadelphia, PA | | L 7–38 | 11,221 | |
| October 31 | 12:00 pm | at No. 11 Boston College | Alumni Stadium; Chestnut Hill, MA | | L 6–45 | 32,812 | |
| November 7 | 1:00 pm | at Akron* | Rubber Bowl; Akron, OH | | L 15–29 | 4,430 | |
| November 14 | 12:00 pm | at No. 1 Miami (FL) | Miami Orange Bowl; Miami, FL | ESPN Plus | L 0–48 | 41,212 | |
| November 21 | 12:00 pm | Rutgers | Veterans Stadium; Philadelphia, PA | | L 10–35 | 8,312 | |
*Non-conference game; Rankings from AP Poll released prior to the game; All times are in Eastern time; Source:

== Roster ==
1992 Temple Owls football team roster
| Players | | | Coaches |
|---|---|---|---|
| Offense: Pos. / # / Name / Class; G / / Tre Johnson / Jr | Defense: Pos. / # / Name / Class; DT / / Brian Vaganek / Sr | Special teams: Pos. / # / Name / Class | Head coach: Jerry Berndt; Coordinators/assistant coaches Legend: (C) Team captain; (S) Suspended; (I) Ineligible; Injured; Redshirt |
