= 1992 Miami Hurricanes football team =

American college football season

1992 Miami Hurricanes football

Sugar Bowl (BC NCG), L 13–34 vs. Alabama
- Conference: Big East Conference

Ranking
- Coaches: No. 3
- AP: No. 3
- Record: 11–1 (4–0 Big East)
- Head coach: Dennis Erickson (4th season)
- Offensive coordinator: Rich Olson (1st season)
- Offensive scheme: One-back spread
- Defensive coordinator: Sonny Lubick (4th season)
- Base defense: 4–3
- MVPs: Micheal Barrow; Gino Torretta
- Home stadium: Miami Orange Bowl

1992 Big East Conference football standings
	Conf.					Overall
Team	W		L		T	W		L		T
No. 3 Miami (FL)	4	–	0	–	0	11	–	1	–	0
No. 6 Syracuse	6	–	1	–	0	10	–	2	–	0
Rutgers	4	–	2	–	0	7	–	4	–	0
No. 21 Boston College	2	–	1	–	1	8	–	3	–	1
West Virginia	2	–	3	–	1	5	–	4	–	2
Pittsburgh	1	–	3	–	0	3	–	9	–	0
Virginia Tech	1	–	4	–	0	2	–	8	–	1
Temple	0	–	6	–	0	1	–	10	–	0
The Big East did not crown an official champion until 1993 when full league play began.; Rankings from AP Poll

The 1992 Miami Hurricanes football team represented the University of Miami during the 1992 NCAA Division I-A football season. It was the Hurricanes' 67th season of football and second as a member of the Big East Conference. The Hurricanes were led by fourth-year head coach Dennis Erickson and played their home games at the Orange Bowl. They finished the season 11–1 overall and 4–0 in the Big East while playing a partial conference schedule. They were invited to the Sugar Bowl, which served as the Bowl Coalition National Championship Game, where they lost to Alabama, 34–13.

Miami quarterback Gino Torretta was awarded the Heisman Trophy as college football's most outstanding player.

== Schedule ==
Date	Time	Opponent	Rank	Site	TV	Result	Attendance	Source
September 5	8:00 pm	at No. 23 Iowa*	No. 1	Kinnick Stadium; Iowa City, IA	ABC	W 24–7	70,397	
September 19	4:00 pm	Florida A&M*	No. 1	Miami Orange Bowl; Miami, FL		W 38–0	74,292	
September 26	4:00 pm	Arizona*	No. 1	Miami Orange Bowl; Miami, FL		W 8–7	47,049	
October 3	12:00 pm	No. 3 Florida State*	No. 2	Miami Orange Bowl; Miami, FL (rivalry)	ABC	W 19–16	77,338	
October 10	12:00 pm	at No. 7 Penn State*	No. 2	Beaver Stadium; University Park, PA	ABC	W 17–14	96,704	
October 17	4:00 pm	TCU*	No. 2	Miami Orange Bowl; Miami, FL		W 45–10	42,915	
October 24	12:00 pm	at Virginia Tech	No. 1	Lane Stadium; Blacksburg, VA (rivalry)	BEN	W 43–23	51,423	
October 31	7:30 pm	West Virginia	No. 1	Miami Orange Bowl; Miami, FL	ESPN	W 35–23	51,246	
November 14	12:00 pm	Temple	No. 1	Miami Orange Bowl; Miami, FL	BEN	W 48–0	41,212	
November 21	3:30 pm	at No. 8 Syracuse	No. 1	Carrier Dome; Syracuse, NY	ABC	W 16–10	49,857	
November 28	7:30 pm	at San Diego State*	No. 1	Jack Murphy Stadium; San Diego, CA	ESPN	W 63–17	52,108	
January 1	8:30 pm	vs. No. 2 Alabama*	No. 1	Louisiana Superdome; New Orleans, LA (Sugar Bowl)	ABC	L 13–34	76,789	
*Non-conference game; Rankings from AP Poll released prior to the game; All times are in Eastern time; Source:

== Rankings ==
Ranking movements Legend: ██ Increase in ranking ██ Decrease in ranking т = Tied with team above or below ( ) = First-place votes
	Week																
Poll	Pre	1	2	3	4	5	6	7	8	9	10	11	12	13	14	15	Final
AP	1 (40)	1 (43)	1 (45)	1 (47)	1 (43)	2 (12)	2 (16)	1 т (30 1/2)	1 т (31)	1 (32)	2 (27 1/2)	1 (61)	1 (61)	1 (61)	1 (61)	1 (61)	3
Coaches	1 (40)	1 (43)	1 (45)	1 (47)	1 (45)	2 (16)	2 (22)	1 (31)	1 (31)	1 (37)	1 (30)	1 (59)	1 (59)	1 (60)	1 (59)	1 (59)	3

== Game summaries ==
=== Iowa ===
#1 Miami (FL) at #23 Iowa

Team	1	2	3	4	Total
• Hurricanes	3	7	0	14	24
Hawkeyes	0	0	0	7	7

- Date: September 5
- Location: Kinnick Stadium
  Iowa City, IA
- Game attendance: 70,397
- TV announcers (ABC): Keith Jackson, Bob Griese, Jack Arute

Scoring summary
1	UM	Prewitt 27-yard field goal	MIA 3–0
2	UM	Williams 11-yard pass from Torretta (Prewitt kick)	MIA 10–0
4	UM	L. Jones 1-yard run (Prewitt kick)	MIA 17–0
4	Iowa	Jasper 31-yard pass from Hartlieb (Krieder kick)	MIA 17–7
4	UM	Spencer 17-yard pass from Torretta (Prewitt kick)	MIA 24–7

=== Florida State ===
#3 Florida State at #2 Miami (FL)

Team	1	2	3	4	Total
Seminoles	7	3	3	3	16
• Hurricanes	0	10	0	9	19

- Date: October 3
- Location: Orange Bowl
  Miami
- Game start: 12:00 p.m. EDT
- Game attendance: 77,338
- Game weather: 83 °F (28 °C), Cloudy, Wind SE 14 mph (23 km/h)
- Referee: Joe Rider
- TV announcers (ABC): Keith Jackson, Bob Griese, Jack Arute

Scoring summary
1		FSU	Tamarick Vanover 94-yard kickoff return (Mowrey kick)	FSU 7–0
2		UM	Dane Prewitt 24-yard field goal	FSU 7–3
2	7:36	UM	C. Bell 29-yard pass from G. Torretta (Prewitt kick)	MIA 10–7
2		FSU	Dan Mowrey 22-yard field goal	Tied 10–10
3		FSU	Dan Mowrey 38-yard field goal	FSU 13–10
4		FSU	Dan Mowrey 41-yard field goal	FSU 16–10
4		UM	L. Thomas 33-yard pass G. Torretta (Prewitt kick)	MIA 17–16
4		UM	Team safety	MIA 19–16

=== Vs. Alabama (Sugar Bowl) ===
#1 Miami (FL) vs. #2 Alabama

Team	1	2	3	4	Total
Hurricanes	3	3	0	7	13
• Crimson Tide	3	10	14	7	34

- Date: January 1
- Location: Louisiana Superdome
  New Orleans
- Game attendance: 76,789
- Game weather: Indoors
- Referee: Rogers Redding (SWC)
- TV announcers (ABC): Keith Jackson, Bob Griese, Jack Arute

Scoring summary
1	10:56	BAMA	Proctor 19-yard field goal	BAMA 3–0
1	7:49	UM	Dane Prewitt 49-yard field goal	Tied 3–3
2	10:48	BAMA	Proctor 23-yard field goal	BAMA 6–3
2	6:09	BAMA	Williams 2-yard run (Proctor kick)	BAMA 13–3
2	0:00	UM	Dane Prewitt 42-yard field goal	BAMA 13–6
3	10:12	BAMA	Lassic 1-yard run (Proctor kick)	BAMA 20–6
3	9:56	BAMA	Teague 31-yard interception return (Proctor kick)	BAMA 27–6
4	12:08	UM	Kevin Williams 78-yard punt return (Prewitt kick)	BAMA 27–13
4	6:46	BAMA	Lassic 4-yard run (Proctor kick)	BAMA 34–13

== Personnel ==
=== Coaching staff ===
Name	Position	Seasons	Alma mater
Dennis Erickson	Head coach	4th	Montana State (1969)
Rich Olson	Offensive coordinator/wide receivers	1st	Washington State (1971)
Sonny Lubick	Defensive coordinator/defensive backs	4th	Western Montana (1960)
Gregg Smith	Offensive line	4th	Idaho (1969)
Dave Arnold	Special teams/tight ends	4th	
Randy Shannon	Defensive line	1st	Miami (1989)
Art Kehoe	Assistant offensive line	8th	Miami (1982)
Ed Orgeron	Defensive line	4th	Northwestern State (1984)
Tommy Tuberville	Linebackers	4th	Southern Arkansas (1976)
Alex Wood	Running backs	4th	Iowa (1978)

=== Support staff ===
Name	Position	Seasons	Alma mater
Brad Roll	Strength & conditioning	4th	Stephen F. Austin (1980)

=== Roster ===
1992 Miami Hurricanes football team roster
Players
Coaches
Offense

Pos.	#	Name	Class
TE	17	Coleman Bell	Sr
RB	33	Donnell Bennett	So
WR	88	Horace Copeland	Sr
OT	72	Mario Cristobal	Sr
WR	35	Darryl Spencer	Sr
WR	36	Lamar Thomas	Sr
QB	13	Gino Torretta	Sr
G	78	Kipp Vickers	Sr
WR	5	Kevin Williams	Sr

Defense

Pos.	#	Name	Class
LB	1	Jessie Armstead	Sr
LB	56	Michael Barrow	Sr
LB	49	Robert Bass	Jr
DT	94	Dwayne Johnson	So
CB	47	Ryan McNeil	Sr
DE	86	Kevin Patrick	Jr
DT	43	Patrick Riley	So
DT	76	Warren Sapp	Fr
DL	93	Robert Davis (injured)	Jr
LB	45	Darrin Smith	Sr

Special teams

Pos.	#	Name	Class
K	21	Maurice Washington

Head coach

- Dennis Erickson

Coordinators/assistant coaches

Legend

- (C) Team captain
- (S) Suspended
- (I) Ineligible
- Injured
- Redshirt

Roster

== Awards and honors ==
- Gino Torretta, Davey O'Brien Award
- Gino Torretta, Heisman Trophy
- Gino Torretta, Johnny Unitas Golden Arm Award
- Gino Torretta, Maxwell Award
- Gino Torretta, Walter Camp Award

=== Jack Harding University of Miami MVP Award ===
- Michael Barrow, LB
- Gino Torretta, QB

== 1993 NFL draft ==
Player	Position	Round	Pick	Team
Ryan McNeil	Defensive Back	2	33	Detroit Lions
Kevin Williams	Wide Receiver	2	46	Dallas Cowboys
Michael Barrow	Linebacker	2	47	Houston Oilers
Darrin Smith	Linebacker	2	54	Dallas Cowboys
Lamar Thomas	Wide Receiver	3	60	Tampa Bay Buccaneers
Horace Copeland	Wide Receiver	4	104	Tampa Bay Buccaneers
Carlos Etheredge	Tight End	6	157	Indianapolis Colts
Gino Toretta	Quarterback	7	192	Minnesota Vikings
Jessie Armstead	Linebacker	8	207	New York Giants
