= 1992 Cincinnati Bearcats football team =

American college football season

1992 Cincinnati Bearcats football
- Conference: Independent
- Record: 3–8
- Head coach: Tim Murphy (4th season)
- Defensive coordinator: John Lovett (4th season)
- Home stadium: Nippert Stadium

1992 NCAA Division I-A independents football records
	Conf.			Overall
Team	W	L	T	W		L		T
No. 4 Notre Dame		–		10	–	1	–	1
Southern Miss		–		7	–	4	–	0
Penn State		–		7	–	5	–	0
Memphis State		–		6	–	5	–	0
Army		–		5	–	6	–	0
East Carolina		–		5	–	6	–	0
Louisiana Tech		–		5	–	6	–	0
Louisville		–		5	–	6	–	0
Northern Illinois		–		5	–	6	–	0
Tulsa		–		4	–	7	–	0
Cincinnati		–		3	–	8	–	0
Arkansas State		–		2	–	9	–	0
Southwestern Louisiana		–		2	–	9	–	0
Tulane		–		2	–	9	–	0
Navy		–		1	–	10	–	0
Rankings from AP Poll

The 1992 Cincinnati Bearcats football team represented the University of Cincinnati during the 1992 NCAA Division I-A football season. The Bearcats, led by head coach Tim Murphy, participated as independent and played their home games at Nippert Stadium.

== Schedule ==
Date	Opponent	Site	TV	Result	Attendance	Source
September 5	No. 8 Penn State	Nippert Stadium; Cincinnati, OH		L 20–24	29,099	
September 19	at Miami (OH)	Yager Stadium; Oxford, OH (Victory Bell)		L 14–17	26,274	
September 26	at No. 8 Tennessee	Neyland Stadium; Knoxville, TN	PPV	L 0–40	96,597	
October 3	Kent State	Nippert Stadium; Cincinnati, OH		W 31–0	16,903	
October 10	at Memphis State	Liberty Bowl Memorial Stadium; Memphis, TN (Rivalry)		L 14–34	39,731	
October 17	at East Carolina	Ficklen Memorial Stadium; Greenville, NC		L 21–42	34,126	
October 24	at Southern Miss	M. M. Roberts Stadium; Hattiesburg, MS		L 17–31	17,298	
October 31	Louisville	Nippert Stadium; Cincinnati, OH (The Keg of Nails)		L 3–26	15,187	
November 7	Rutgers	Nippert Stadium; Cincinnati, OH		W 26–24	9,896	
November 14	Kentucky	Nippert Stadium; Cincinnati, OH		W 17–13	30,104	
November 21	Akron	Nippert Stadium; Cincinnati, OH		L 22–24	7,738	
Rankings from AP Poll released prior to the game

== Roster ==
1992 Cincinnati Bearcats football team roster
Players
Coaches
Offense

Pos.	#	Name	Class
RB		Joe Abrams
QB	19	Paul Anderson	Jr
TE	88	Kris Bjorson	Sr
FB	7	Mike Britford	Jr
WR	1	Damon Bryant	Jr
OT	65	Jim Carmon	Sr
C	67	Jamie Crydales	Sr
RB		Chuck Fitzgerald
TE	86	Mike Guzda	Jr
RB	32	Darrell Harding	Fr
QB	11	Lance Harp	Jr
WR	2	Brian Jenkins	Jr
OT	74	Dave Katz	Jr
RB	24	Craedel Kimbrough	Fr
G	76	Steve Lamar	So
G	64	Jaime Lemire	Fr
WR		Dave Patania
FB	33	Eric Patterson	Fr
WR	5	Marlon Pearce	Jr
RB	3	David Small	Jr
RB		Scott Smith
WR	4	Sean Stewart	Fr
WR	21	Albert Sweet	Jr
G	73	Matt Vaupel	So

Defense

Pos.	#	Name	Class
DT	85	Ernest Allen	So
CB	6	Jocelyn Borgella	Jr
LB	47	Scott Brown	Sr
LB	48	Jason Coppess	Jr
CB	8	Michael Davis	Jr
LB	49	Nate Dingle	Jr
DT	95	Ronnie Dixon	Sr
DT	57	Bob Duckens	Jr
FS	10	Alan Fletcher	Jr
LB	42	Reggie Hudson	So
SS	15	Latish Kinsler	Jr
LB	45	Partick John	Jr
DT	99	Gary Reid	Sr
SS	26	Jody White	So

Special teams

Pos.	#	Name	Class

Head coach

- Tim Murphy

Coordinators/assistant coaches

- Craig Ver Steeg (QB/RC)

Legend

- (C) Team captain
- (S) Suspended
- (I) Ineligible
- Injured
- Redshirt
