= 1992 Navy Midshipmen football team =

American college football season

1992 Navy Midshipmen football
- Conference: Independent
- Record: 1–10
- Head coach: George Chaump (3rd season)
- Defensive coordinator: Greg McMackin (1st season)
- MVP: Chad Chatlos
- Captains: Chad Chatlos; Eric McGowan; Steve Palmer
- Home stadium: Navy–Marine Corps Memorial Stadium

1992 NCAA Division I-A independents football records
	Conf.			Overall
Team	W	L	T	W		L		T
No. 4 Notre Dame		–		10	–	1	–	1
Southern Miss		–		7	–	4	–	0
Penn State		–		7	–	5	–	0
Memphis State		–		6	–	5	–	0
Army		–		5	–	6	–	0
East Carolina		–		5	–	6	–	0
Louisiana Tech		–		5	–	6	–	0
Louisville		–		5	–	6	–	0
Northern Illinois		–		5	–	6	–	0
Tulsa		–		4	–	7	–	0
Cincinnati		–		3	–	8	–	0
Arkansas State		–		2	–	9	–	0
Southwestern Louisiana		–		2	–	9	–	0
Tulane		–		2	–	9	–	0
Navy		–		1	–	10	–	0
Rankings from AP Poll

The 1992 Navy Midshipmen football team represented the United States Naval Academy (USNA) as an independent during the 1992 NCAA Division I-A football season. The team was led by third-year head coach George Chaump. The season's poor results could be attributed to inconsistency at quarterback, mostly due to injury, as five different players saw playing time at the position.

== Schedule ==
Date	Time	Opponent	Site	Result	Attendance	Source
September 12		Virginia	Navy–Marine Corps Memorial Stadium; Annapolis, MD	L 0–53	28,627	
September 19		at Boston College	Alumni Stadium; Chestnut Hill, MA	L 0–28	32,116	
September 26		Rutgers	Navy–Marine Corps Memorial Stadium; Annapolis, MD	L 0–40	25,321	
October 3		at North Carolina	Kenan Memorial Stadium; Chapel Hill, NC	L 14–28	42,000	
October 10		at Air Force	Falcon Stadium; Colorado Springs, CO (Commander-in-Chief's Trophy)	L 16–18	47,687	
October 24		No. 7 (I-AA) Delaware^{†}	Navy–Marine Corps Memorial Stadium; Annapolis, MD	L 21–37	32,189	
October 31	1:00 p.m.	vs. Notre Dame	Giants Stadium; East Rutherford, NJ (rivalry)	L 7–38	58,769	
November 7		Tulane	Navy–Marine Corps Memorial Stadium; Annapolis, MD	W 20–17	21,912	
November 14		Vanderbilt	Navy–Marine Corps Memorial Stadium; Annapolis, MD	L 7–27	21,954	
November 21		at Rice	Rice Stadium; Houston, TX	L 22–27	23,600	
December 5		vs. Army	Veterans Stadium; Philadelphia, PA (Army–Navy Game)	L 24–25	65,207	
^{†}Homecoming; Rankings from AP Poll released prior to the game; All times are in Eastern time; Source:

== Personnel ==
1992 Navy Midshipmen football team roster
Players
Coaches
Offense

Pos.	#	Name	Class
WR		Che Bolden
WR		Damon Dixon
RB		Robbie Edwards
QB		Brian Ellis
TE		Tony Gilless
TE		Kevin Hickman
QB		Lionel Hines
OT		Greg Hubbard	Sr
RB		Duke Ingraham
RB		Billy James
WR		Mike Jefferson
RB		Mike Kozub
QB		Jim Kubiak
OT	59	Max Lane	Jr
OL		Steve Palmer
OL		Dave Papp
OL		Dan Pidgeon
WR		Tom Pritchard
WR		Matt Scornavacchi
WR		Jimmy Screen
QB		Steve Seoane
QB		Tony Solliday
QB		Keith Smart
RB		Cleavon Smith
OL		Blair Sokol
QB	5	Jason Van Matre	Jr
RB		Jeff Williams
RB		Monty Williams

Defense

Pos.	#	Name	Class
LB	47	Chris Beck	Sr
S		Chad Chatlos
DB		Grover Favors
DL		Robert Goodson
LB		Shane Halloran
DB		Chris Hart
DB		Cory James
DT	90	Bob Kuberski	Jr
DB		Steve Lipsey
DL		Andy Person
DL		Ty Renick
DB		Michael Riggins
DL		David Shaw
DL		Ches Snider
DB		Joe Speed
DB		Andy Thompson
DB		Jon Wellington
DL		Stacey Yopp
DT	98	Jake Zweig	So
LB		Javier Zuluaga

Special teams

Pos.	#	Name	Class
P		Greg Emery
K		Tim Rogers
P		Brian Schrum

Head coach

- George Chaump

Coordinators/assistant coaches

Legend

- (C) Team captain
- (S) Suspended
- (I) Ineligible
- Injured
- Redshirt
