= 1993 Fiesta Bowl =

1993 IBM OS/2 Fiesta Bowl
- 22nd Fiesta Bowl
Syracuse Orangemen	Colorado Buffaloes
(9–2)	(9–1–1)
Big East	Big 8
26	22
Head coach: Paul Pasqualoni	Head coach: Bill McCartney
AP / Coaches / BC; 6 / 9 / 7	AP / Coaches / BC; 10 / 6 / 9
	1	2	3	4	Total
Syracuse	3	3	20	0	26
Colorado	0	7	9	6	22
- Date: January 1, 1993
- Season: 1992
- Stadium: Sun Devil Stadium
- Location: Tempe, Arizona
- MVP: QB Marvin Graves & NG Kevin Mitchell
- Referee: Gordon Riese (Pac-10)
- Attendance: 70,224

United States TV coverage
- Network: NBC
- Announcers: Charlie Jones, Todd Christensen
- Nielsen ratings: 7.9

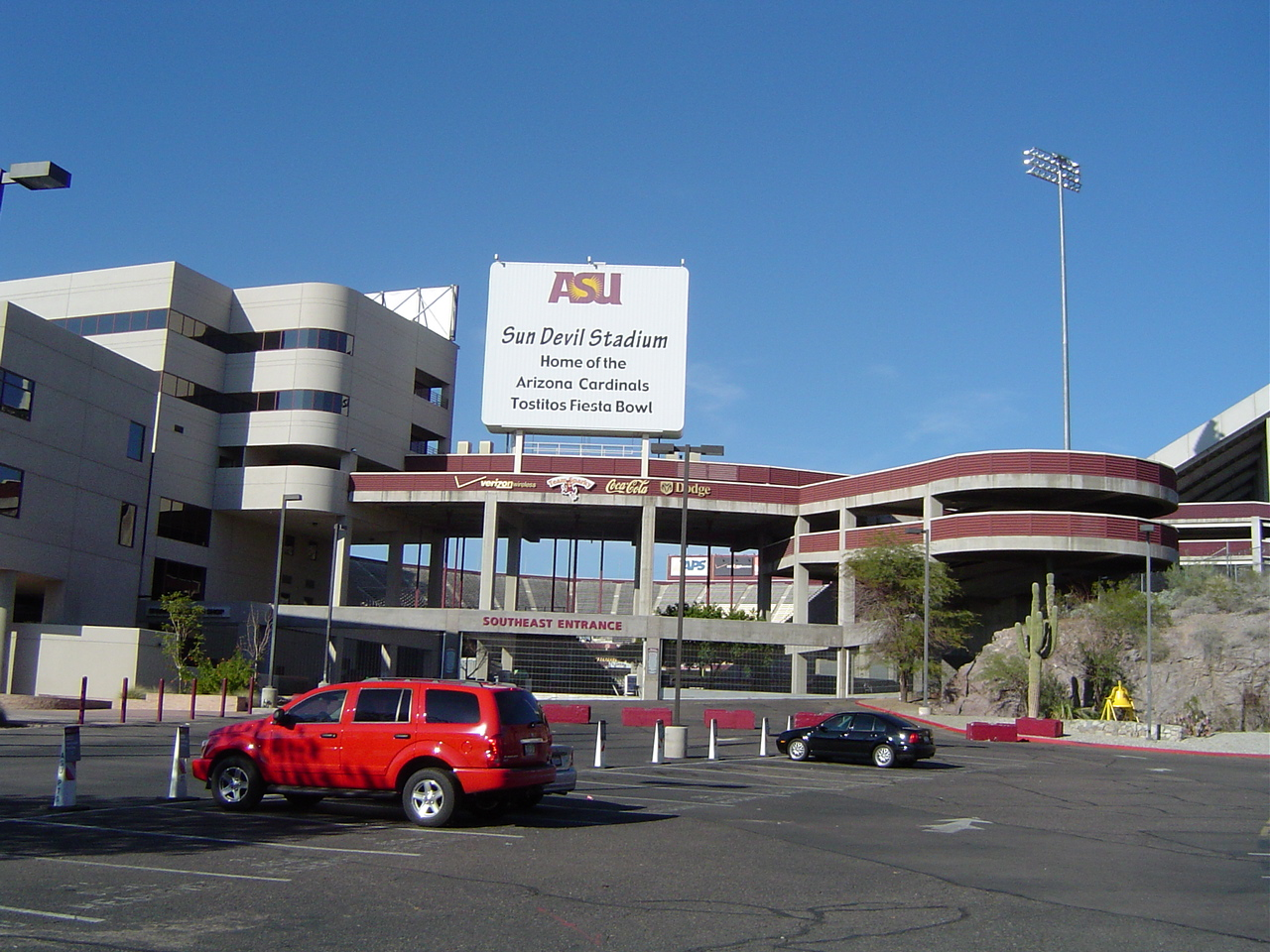
Sun Devil Stadium in Tempe, Arizona, hosted the Fiesta Bowl.

The 1993 IBM OS/2 Fiesta Bowl, played on January 1, 1993, was the 22nd edition of the Fiesta Bowl. The game featured the Colorado Buffaloes and the Syracuse Orangemen.

== Game summary ==
=== 1st half ===
Syracuse opened up a 6–0 lead following field goals of 46 and 34 yards from John Biskup. In the second quarter, quarterback Kordell Stewart threw a 7-yard touchdown pass to Sean Embree to give Colorado a 7–6 lead. That would close out the first half scoring.

=== 2nd half ===
With 6:22 left in the third quarter, tailback David Walker scored on a 13-yard touchdown run. Up 12–7, Syracuse opted for two, but failed, leaving the score at 12–7, Syracuse. Colorado's Mitch Berger connected on a 38-yard field goal with 3:10 left in the quarter, to cut the lead to 12–10.

Facing a third and 10 on Colorado's 28-yard line, Marvin Graves took it himself, and ran 28 yards for a touchdown, increasing Syracuse's lead to 19–10 with 1:33 in the quarter. Colorado running back James Hill ran for 61 yards a few plays later, to set up a 16-yard slant pass from Stewart to Charles Johnson. The all-important extra point was missed, and Syracuse held on to a 19–16 lead.

On the ensuing kickoff, Kirby Dar Dar took a reverse handoff from Qadry Ismail and scored on a dazzling 100 yard kickoff return, increasing the lead to 26–16. Following a 6-yard touchdown run, Colorado pulled to within 26–22, but the extra point missed. The kicking game decided the outcome of the game.
