= 1992 Arkansas State Indians football team =

American college football season

1992 Arkansas State Indians football
- Conference: Independent
- Record: 2–9
- Head coach: Ray Perkins (1st season)
- Offensive coordinator: Ray Perkins (1st season)
- Defensive coordinator: Pete McGinnis (1st season)
- Home stadium: Indian Stadium

1992 NCAA Division I-A independents football records
	Conf.			Overall
Team	W	L	T	W		L		T
No. 4 Notre Dame		–		10	–	1	–	1
Southern Miss		–		7	–	4	–	0
Penn State		–		7	–	5	–	0
Memphis State		–		6	–	5	–	0
Army		–		5	–	6	–	0
East Carolina		–		5	–	6	–	0
Louisiana Tech		–		5	–	6	–	0
Louisville		–		5	–	6	–	0
Northern Illinois		–		5	–	6	–	0
Tulsa		–		4	–	7	–	0
Cincinnati		–		3	–	8	–	0
Arkansas State		–		2	–	9	–	0
Southwestern Louisiana		–		2	–	9	–	0
Tulane		–		2	–	9	–	0
Navy		–		1	–	10	–	0
Rankings from AP Poll

The 1992 Arkansas State Indians football team represented Arkansas State University as an independent during the 1992 NCAA Division I-A football season. Led by Ray Perkins in his first and only season as head coach, the Indians compiled a record of 2–9. It was Arkansas State's first season at the NCAA Division 1-A level.

== Schedule ==
Date	Opponent	Site	Result	Attendance	Source
September 5	at Toledo	Glass Bowl; Toledo, OH	L 0–49	15,900	
September 12	at No. 13 Oklahoma	Oklahoma Memorial Stadium; Norman, OK	L 0–61	66,761	
September 19	Northern Illinois	Indian Stadium; Jonesboro, AR	L 0–31	12,700	
September 26	Southern Illinois	Indian Stadium; Jonesboro, AR	W 42–38	8,000	
October 3	Northwestern State^{†}	Indian Stadium; Jonesboro, AR	L 18–24	16,300	
October 10	Troy State	Indian Stadium; Jonesboro, AR	L 7–41	7,500	
October 17	at Memphis State	Liberty Bowl Memorial Stadium; Memphis, TN (Paint Bucket Bowl)	L 7–37	23,104	
October 24	at No. 25 Mississippi State	Scott Stadium; Starkville, MS	L 6–56	39,566	
October 31	at Louisiana Tech	Joe Aillet Stadium; Ruston, LA	L 0–23	14,200	
November 14	at East Carolina	Ficklen Memorial Stadium; Greenville, NC	L 18–35	25,072	
November 21	at Southwestern Louisiana	Cajun Field; Lafayette, LA	W 20–7 (Note: Game stopped in the fourth quarter due to lightning.)	14,000	
^{†}Homecoming; Rankings from AP Poll released prior to the game
