= 1992 West Virginia Mountaineers football team =

American college football season

1992 West Virginia Mountaineers football
- Conference: Big East Conference
- Record: 5–4–2 (2–3–1 Big East)
- Head coach: Don Nehlen (13th season)
- Defensive coordinator: Steve Dunlap (1st season)
- Home stadium: Mountaineer Field

1992 Big East Conference football standings
	Conf.					Overall
Team	W		L		T	W		L		T
No. 3 Miami (FL)	4	–	0	–	0	11	–	1	–	0
No. 6 Syracuse	6	–	1	–	0	10	–	2	–	0
Rutgers	4	–	2	–	0	7	–	4	–	0
No. 21 Boston College	2	–	1	–	1	8	–	3	–	1
West Virginia	2	–	3	–	1	5	–	4	–	2
Pittsburgh	1	–	3	–	0	3	–	9	–	0
Virginia Tech	1	–	4	–	0	2	–	8	–	1
Temple	0	–	6	–	0	1	–	10	–	0
The Big East did not crown an official champion until 1993 when full league play began.; Rankings from AP Poll

The 1992 West Virginia Mountaineers football team represented West Virginia University as a member of the Big East Conference during the 1992 NCAA Division I-A football season. Led by 13th-year head coach Don Nehlen, the Mountaineers compiled an overall record of 5–4–2 with a mark of 2–3–1 in conference play. West Virginia played home games at Mountaineer Field in Morgantown, West Virginia.

== Schedule ==
Date	Time	Opponent	Rank	Site	TV	Result	Attendance	Source
September 5	5:00 p.m.	Miami (OH)*		Mountaineer Field; Morgantown, WV		T 29–29	45,418	
September 12	12:00 p.m.	at Pittsburgh		Pitt Stadium; Pittsburgh, PA (Backyard Brawl)	BEN	W 44–6	41,723	
September 19	1:00 p.m.	Maryland*		Mountaineer Field; Morgantown, WV (rivalry)		W 34–33	55,727	
September 26	1:00 p.m.	at Virginia Tech		Lane Stadium; Blacksburg, VA (rivalry)		W 16–7	51,211	
October 3	12:00 p.m.	No. 22 Boston College		Mountaineer Field; Morgantown, WV	BEN	T 24–24	55,634	
October 17	12:00 p.m.	No. 14 Syracuse	No. 24	Mountaineer Field; Morgantown, WV (rivalry)	BEN	L 17–20	52,627	
October 24	3:30 p.m.	No. 14 Penn State*		Mountaineer Field; Morgantown, WV (rivalry)	ABC	L 26–40	66,663	
October 31	7:30 p.m.	at No. 1 Miami (FL)		Miami Orange Bowl; Miami, FL	ESPN	L 23–35	51,246	
November 7	1:00 p.m.	East Carolina*		Mountaineer Field; Morgantown, WV		W 41–28	41,139	
November 14	12:00 p.m.	at Rutgers		Rutgers Stadium; Piscataway, NJ	BEN	L 9–13	22,295	
November 21	1:00 p.m.	Louisiana Tech*		Mountaineer Field; Morgantown, WV		W 23–3	27,751	
*Non-conference game; Rankings from AP Poll released prior to the game; All times are in Eastern time

== Roster ==
1992 West Virginia Mountaineers football team roster
Players
Coaches
Offense

Pos.	#	Name	Class
WR	5	Ed Hill	Jr
QB	14	Darren Studstill	Jr
WR	15	James Jett	Sr
QB	17	Jake Kelchner	Jr
WR	18	Jay Kearney	Jr
RB	31	Carl Hayes	Sr
RB	32	Garrett Ford, Jr.	Sr
RB	33	Jon Jones	Jr
RB	33	Mondray Outland	Fr
FB	34	Doug Costin	Jr
RB	35	Keith Taparausky	Jr
RB	36	Jeff Patrick	Fr
WR	37	Tony Alexander	Fr
WR	39	Brett Parise	Sr
RB	40	Jim West	Jr
RB	42	Adrian Murrell	Sr
G, C	77	Mike Compton	Sr
OT	78	Rich Braham	Jr

Defense

Pos.	#	Name	Class
DB	22	Harold Kidd	So
DB	23	Kwame Smith	Sr
DB	24	Tommy Orr	Jr
DB	25	Mike Collins	Jr
CB	31	Aaron Beasley	Fr

Special teams

Pos.	#	Name	Class
P	16	Todd Sauerbrun	So
P	13	Mike Vanderjagt	Sr

Head coach

- Don Nehlen

Coordinators/assistant coaches

Legend

- (C) Team captain
- (S) Suspended
- (I) Ineligible
- Injured
- Redshirt

== Team players in the NFL ==
Player	Position	Round	Pick	NFL club
Mike Compton	Guard	3	68	Detroit Lions
Adrian Murrell	Running back	5	120	New York Jets
