= 1992 Rutgers Scarlet Knights football team =

American college football season

1992 Rutgers Scarlet Knights football
- Conference: Big East Conference
- Record: 7–4 (4–2 Big East)
- Head coach: Doug Graber (3rd season)
- Offensive coordinator: Stan Parrish (3rd season)
- Defensive coordinator: Rich Rachel (3rd season)
- Home stadium: Rutgers Stadium; Giants Stadium

1992 Big East Conference football standings
| | Conf. | | | | | Overall |
| Team | W | | L | | T | W | | L | | T |
|---|---|---|---|---|---|---|---|---|---|---|
| No. 3 Miami (FL) | 4 | – | 0 | – | 0 | 11 | – | 1 | – | 0 |
| No. 6 Syracuse | 6 | – | 1 | – | 0 | 10 | – | 2 | – | 0 |
| Rutgers | 4 | – | 2 | – | 0 | 7 | – | 4 | – | 0 |
| No. 21 Boston College | 2 | – | 1 | – | 1 | 8 | – | 3 | – | 1 |
| West Virginia | 2 | – | 3 | – | 1 | 5 | – | 4 | – | 2 |
| Pittsburgh | 1 | – | 3 | – | 0 | 3 | – | 9 | – | 0 |
| Virginia Tech | 1 | – | 4 | – | 0 | 2 | – | 8 | – | 1 |
| Temple | 0 | – | 6 | – | 0 | 1 | – | 10 | – | 0 |
The Big East did not crown an official champion until 1993 when full league play began.; Rankings from AP Poll

The 1992 Rutgers Scarlet Knights football team represented Rutgers University in the 1992 NCAA Division I-A football season. In their third season under head coach Doug Graber, the Scarlet Knights compiled a 7–4 record, outscored their opponents 341 to 245, and finished in third place in the Big East Conference. The team's statistical leaders included Bryan Fortay with 1,608 passing yards, Bruce Presley with 817 rushing yards, and James Guarantino with 755 receiving yards.

== Schedule ==
| Date | Time | Opponent | Site | TV | Result | Attendance | Source |
|---|---|---|---|---|---|---|---|
| September 5 | | at Boston College | Alumni Stadium; Chestnut Hill, MA | | L 20–37 | 29,110 | |
| September 12 | | Colgate* | Rutgers Stadium; Piscataway, NJ | | W 41–0 | 20,096 | |
| September 17 | 8:00 pm | Pittsburgh | Rutgers Stadium; Piscataway, NJ | ESPN | W 21–16 | 26,017 | |
| September 26 | | at Navy* | Navy–Marine Corps Memorial Stadium; Annapolis, MD | | W 40-0 | 25,321 | |
| October 3 | | No. 8 Penn State* | Giants Stadium; East Rutherford, NJ | | L 24–38 | 61,526 | |
| October 10 | 12:00 pm | at No. 15 Syracuse | Carrier Dome; Syracuse, NY | BEN | L 28–50 | 49,194 | |
| October 17 | | Army* | Giants Stadium; East Rutherford, NJ | | W 45–10 | 22,164 | |
| October 31 | 12:00 pm | Virginia Tech | Rutgers Stadium; Piscataway, NJ | | W 50–49 | 28,432 | |
| November 7 | | at Cincinnati* | Nippert Stadium; Cincinnati, OH | | L 24–26 | 9,896 | |
| November 14 | 12:00 pm | West Virginia | Rutgers Stadium; Piscataway, NJ | BEN | W 13–9 | 22,295 | |
| November 21 | 12:00 pm | at Temple | Veterans Stadium; Philadelphia, PA | | W 35–10 | 8,312 | |
*Non-conference game; Rankings from AP Poll released prior to the game

== Roster ==
1992 Rutgers Scarlet Knights football team roster
Players
Coaches
Offense

| Pos. | # | Name | Class |
|---|---|---|---|
| TE | 81 | Marco Battaglia | Fr |
| WR | 12 | Chris Brantley | Jr |
| C | 54 | Travis Broadbent | Sr |
| WR | 8 | Mario Henry | So |
| QB | 1 | Ray Lucas | Fr |
| WR | 18 | Jim Guarantano | Sr |
| TE | 88 | Chris Stoll | Jr |

Defense

| Pos. | # | Name | Class |
|---|---|---|---|
| FS | 9 | Jay Bellamy | Jr |
| DB | 14 | Jim McCaffery | Fr |
| LB | 44 | Paul Miccinilli | Fr |
| LB | 55 | Todd Lane | Sr |
| DT | 78 | Mike Spitzer | Jr |
| DB | 17 | Mario Zaburski | Fr |

Special teams

| Pos. | # | Name | Class |
|---|---|---|---|
| P | 17 | David Dunne | Sr |

Head coach

- Doug Graber

Coordinators/assistant coaches

Legend

- (C) Team captain
- (S) Suspended
- (I) Ineligible
- Injured
- Redshirt

== Season summary ==
=== at Navy ===
External videos
- 1992 Rutgers at Navy – full game
