= 1992 Louisville Cardinals football team =

American college football season

1992 Louisville Cardinals football
- Conference: Independent
- Record: 5–6
- Head coach: Howard Schnellenberger (8th season)
- Offensive coordinator: Gary Nord (4th season)
- Defensive coordinator: Ty Smith (2nd season)
- Home stadium: Cardinal Stadium

1992 NCAA Division I-A independents football records
	Conf.			Overall
Team	W	L	T	W		L		T
No. 4 Notre Dame		–		10	–	1	–	1
Southern Miss		–		7	–	4	–	0
Penn State		–		7	–	5	–	0
Memphis State		–		6	–	5	–	0
Army		–		5	–	6	–	0
East Carolina		–		5	–	6	–	0
Louisiana Tech		–		5	–	6	–	0
Louisville		–		5	–	6	–	0
Northern Illinois		–		5	–	6	–	0
Tulsa		–		4	–	7	–	0
Cincinnati		–		3	–	8	–	0
Arkansas State		–		2	–	9	–	0
Southwestern Louisiana		–		2	–	9	–	0
Tulane		–		2	–	9	–	0
Navy		–		1	–	10	–	0
Rankings from AP Poll

The 1992 Louisville Cardinals football team represented the University of Louisville as an independent during the 1992 NCAA Division I-A football season. Led by eighth-year head coach Howard Schnellenberger, the Cardinals compiled a record of 5–6. The team played home games in Cardinal Stadium in Louisville, Kentucky.

== Schedule ==
Date	Opponent	Site	TV	Result	Attendance	Source
September 5	at No. 17 Ohio State	Ohio Stadium; Columbus, OH	ESPN	L 19–20	89,653	
September 12	Memphis State	Cardinal Stadium; Louisville, KY (rivalry)		W 16–15	37,192	
September 19	at Arizona State	Sun Devil Stadium; Tempe, AZ		L 0–19	45,782	
September 26	Wyoming	Cardinal Stadium; Louisville, KY		L 24–26	28,463	
October 3	No. 17 Syracuse	Cardinal Stadium; Louisville, KY		L 9–15	37,323	
October 10	Virginia Tech	Cardinal Stadium; Louisville, KY		W 21–17	29,418	
October 17	Tulsa	Cardinal Stadium; Louisville, KY		W 32–27	29,517	
October 24	at No. 6 Florida	Ben Hill Griffin Stadium; Gainesville, FL		L 17–31	84,476	
October 31	at Cincinnati	Nippert Stadium; Cincinnati, OH (The Keg of Nails)		W 27–17	15,187	
November 7	at No. 5 Texas A&M	Kyle Field; College Station, TX	ABC	L 18–40	48,848	
November 14	at Pittsburgh	Pitt Stadium; Pittsburgh, PA		W 31–16	14,065	
Rankings from AP Poll released prior to the game; Source:

== Roster ==
1992 Louisville Cardinals football team roster
Players
Coaches
Offense

Pos.	#	Name	Class
QB	11	Jeff Brohm	Jr
C	74	Garin Patrick

Defense

Pos.	#	Name	Class
DB	3	Deral Boykin
CB	34	Ray Buchanan	Sr
DT	95	Jim Hanna
DE	94	Joe Johnson

Special teams

Pos.	#	Name	Class

Head coach

- Howard Schnellenberger

Coordinators/assistant coaches

Legend

- (C) Team captain
- (S) Suspended
- (I) Ineligible
- Injured
- Redshirt

== Team players in the NFL draft ==
Player	Position	Round	Pick	NFL club
Ray Buchanan	Cornerback	3	65	Indianapolis Colts
Deral Boykin	Safety	6	149	Los Angeles Rams
