= 1992 Tulane Green Wave football team =

American college football season

1992 Tulane Green Wave football
- Conference: Independent
- Record: 2–9
- Head coach: Buddy Teevens (1st season)
- Offensive coordinator: Brud Bicknell (1st season)
- Home stadium: Louisiana Superdome

1992 NCAA Division I-A independents football records
	Conf.			Overall
Team	W	L	T	W		L		T
No. 4 Notre Dame		–		10	–	1	–	1
Southern Miss		–		7	–	4	–	0
Penn State		–		7	–	5	–	0
Memphis State		–		6	–	5	–	0
Army		–		5	–	6	–	0
East Carolina		–		5	–	6	–	0
Louisiana Tech		–		5	–	6	–	0
Louisville		–		5	–	6	–	0
Northern Illinois		–		5	–	6	–	0
Tulsa		–		4	–	7	–	0
Cincinnati		–		3	–	8	–	0
Arkansas State		–		2	–	9	–	0
Southwestern Louisiana		–		2	–	9	–	0
Tulane		–		2	–	9	–	0
Navy		–		1	–	10	–	0
Rankings from AP Poll

The 1992 Tulane Green Wave football team was an American football team that represented Tulane University during the 1992 NCAA Division I-A football season as an independent. In their first year under head coach Buddy Teevens, the team compiled a 2–9 record.

== Schedule ==
Date	Opponent	Site	Result	Attendance	Source
September 5	at SMU	Ownby Stadium; University Park, TX	W 13–12	15,100	
September 12	at Ole Miss	Vaught–Hemingway Stadium; Oxford, MS (rivalry)	L 9–35	30,200	
September 19	at Iowa State	Cyclone Stadium; Ames, IA	L 14–38	38,913	
September 26	Nevada	Louisiana Superdome; New Orleans, LA	W 34–17	23,741	
October 10	No. 6 Alabama	Louisiana Superdome; New Orleans, LA	L 0–37	50,240	
October 17	Southern Miss	Louisiana Superdome; New Orleans, LA (rivalry)	L 7–17	21,760	
October 24	No. 11 Boston College	Louisiana Superdome; New Orleans, LA	L 13–17	25,646	
October 31	Memphis State	Louisiana Superdome; New Orleans, LA	L 20–62	20,936	
November 7	at Navy	Navy–Marine Corps Memorial Stadium; Annapolis, MD	L 17–20	21,912	
November 14	at No. 5 Florida State	Doak Campbell Stadium; Tallahassee, FL	L 7–70	60,127	
November 21	at LSU	Tiger Stadium; Baton Rouge, LA (Battle for the Rag)	L 12–24	59,919	
Rankings from AP Poll released prior to the game; Source:

== Roster ==
1992 Tulane Green Wave football team roster
Players
Coaches
Offense

Pos.	#	Name	Class
QB	16	Shawn Meadows	Jr
RB	24	Joey Perry	So
C	61	Mitch Tinsley	So
WR	2	Jerry Ursin	Sr
WR	1	Wil Ursin	Jr

Defense

Pos.	#	Name	Class
DT	54	Michael Batiste	Jr
DT	68	Reggie Davis	Jr
LB	23	Wilbert Gilmore	Jr
CB	34	Brandon Hamilton	Jr
LB	44	Ruffin Hamilton	Jr
LB	98	Michael Smartt	Jr
S	7	Willie Smith	Jr
S	15	Mike Staid	So

Special teams

Pos.	#	Name	Class

Head coach

- Buddy Teevens

Coordinators/assistant coaches

Legend

- (C) Team captain
- (S) Suspended
- (I) Ineligible
- Injured
- Redshirt
