= 1992 Virginia Tech Hokies football team =

American college football season

1992 Virginia Tech Hokies football
- Conference: Big East Conference
- Record: 2–8–1 (1–4 Big East)
- Head coach: Frank Beamer (6th season)
- Offensive coordinator: Steve Marshall (5th season)
- Offensive scheme: Pro-style
- Defensive coordinator: Mike Clark (5th season)
- Base defense: 4–4
- Home stadium: Lane Stadium

1992 Big East Conference football standings
	Conf.					Overall
Team	W		L		T	W		L		T
No. 3 Miami (FL)	4	–	0	–	0	11	–	1	–	0
No. 6 Syracuse	6	–	1	–	0	10	–	2	–	0
Rutgers	4	–	2	–	0	7	–	4	–	0
No. 21 Boston College	2	–	1	–	1	8	–	3	–	1
West Virginia	2	–	3	–	1	5	–	4	–	2
Pittsburgh	1	–	3	–	0	3	–	9	–	0
Virginia Tech	1	–	4	–	0	2	–	8	–	1
Temple	0	–	6	–	0	1	–	10	–	0
The Big East did not crown an official champion until 1993 when full league play began.; Rankings from AP Poll

The 1992 Virginia Tech Hokies football team represented Virginia Tech during the 1992 NCAA Division I-A football season. Led by sixth-year head coach Frank Beamer, the Hokies finished the season with a 2–8–1 record (1–4 in the Big East). While the season resulted in the worst winning percentage of Beamer’s tenure, it is historically significant as the pivotal turning point that preceded the program's subsequent 27-year bowl streak. The team featured a potent offense led by sophomore quarterback Maurice DeShazo, who passed for 1,811 yards, and running back Vaughn Hebron, who led the team with 579 rushing yards. The defense was led by standout performers including linebacker Tyronne Drakeford, who recorded a team-high seven interceptions, and defenders Melendez Byrd and P.J. Preston, who tied for the team lead with 89 total tackles each.

Despite the offensive production, the season was defined by a series of narrow losses; the Hokies suffered four defeats by a combined total of only eight points. These included a 30–27 loss to East Carolina, a 21–17 defeat at Louisville, and a 13–12 loss to Southern Miss. The season also featured a 50–49 shootout loss to Rutgers and a 13–13 tie against #21 NC State, which stands as the final tie in program history prior to the implementation of NCAA overtime rules.

The 2–8–1 finish led to intense public pressure for Beamer’s dismissal. Athletic Director Dave Braine later recounted that the environment was so hostile he began skipping Sunday church services to avoid disgruntled fans, opting instead to spend Sunday mornings in the film room with the coaching staff—a ritual that became known for the "Sunday Donuts" Braine provided. Observing the staff's meticulous preparation despite the mounting losses, Braine remained convinced that the program's struggles were rooted in scholarship reductions from previous NCAA probation rather than coaching incompetence. Following a season-ending 41–38 loss to rival Virginia, in which the Hokies scored 21 points in the fourth quarter, Braine successfully recommended to University President James McComas that Beamer be retained. However, the retention required a massive staff overhaul; Beamer dismissed four assistants, including offensive coordinator Steve Marshall and defensive coordinator Mike Clark. This restructuring led to the promotion of Bud Foster and established the foundation for the "Lunch Pail Defense" and the Hokies' 9–3 rebound in 1993.

The 1992 season holds a unique place in program history as the final year Virginia Tech failed to qualify for a postseason appearance for nearly three decades. The following year, the Hokies began an unprecedented 27-year bowl streak that lasted from 1993 through 2019, which stood as the longest active streak in the nation at the time of its conclusion. This streak did not officially end until the 2020 season, when the team finished with a 5–6 record and the players ultimately voted to decline a bowl invitation due to the hardships associated with the COVID-19 pandemic. Consequently, the 1992 squad remained the last Virginia Tech team to be excluded from the postseason based on performance and record until the program's bowl-less season in 2022.

== Schedule ==
Date	Time	Opponent	Site	TV	Result	Attendance	Source
September 5	7:00 p.m.	James Madison*	Lane Stadium; Blacksburg, VA		W 49–20	43,684	
September 12	12:00 p.m.	at East Carolina*	Ficklen Memorial Stadium; Greenville, NC		L 27–30	35,121	
September 19	12:00 p.m.	at Temple	Veterans Stadium; Philadelphia, PA	BEN	W 26–7	11,861	
September 26	1:00 p.m.	West Virginia	Lane Stadium; Blacksburg, VA (rivalry)		L 7–16	51,211	
October 10	4:00 p.m.	at Louisville*	Cardinal Stadium; Louisville, KY		L 17–21	29,418	
October 17	1:00 p.m.	No. 21 NC State*	Lane Stadium; Blacksburg, VA		T 13–13	43,628	
October 24	12:00 p.m.	No. 1 Miami (FL)	Lane Stadium; Blacksburg, VA	BEN	L 23–43	51,423	
October 31	12:00 p.m.	at Rutgers	Rutgers Stadium; Piscataway, NJ		L 49–50	28,432	
November 7	12:00 p.m.	at No. 10 Syracuse	Carrier Dome; Syracuse, NY	BEN	L 9–28	49,196	
November 14	1:00 p.m.	Southern Miss*	Lane Stadium; Blacksburg, VA		L 12–13	27,342	
November 21	4:00 p.m.	Virginia*	Lane Stadium; Blacksburg, VA (rivalry)		L 38–41	53,271	
*Non-conference game; Rankings from AP Poll released prior to the game; All times are in Eastern time

== Game summaries ==
=== James Madison ===
James Madison at Virginia Tech

Team	1	2	3	4	Total
James Madison	7	7	6	0	20
• Virginia Tech	7	7	21	14	49

- Date: September 5, 1992
- Location: Lane Stadium, Blacksburg, VA
- Game attendance: 43,684
- Game weather: 70°F, Wind Calm

Virginia Tech opened the 1992 season with a 49–20 victory over James Madison, pulling away with a 21-point surge in the third quarter. The Hokies' offensive explosion was defined by a significant yardage advantage, as they averaged 8.9 yards per play throughout the contest.

Earlier in the game, the two teams traded scores to enter halftime tied at 14–14. The momentum shifted permanently after the break when Maurice DeShazo connected with Antonio Freeman for two long touchdowns of 69 and 64 yards.

Virginia Tech finished with 581 total yards of offense compared to 360 for the Dukes. The Hokies' scoring was rounded out by a 41-yard run from Vaughn Hebron and a late 49-yard touchdown pass from Tony Kennedy to Steve Sanders.

Maurice DeShazo led the passing attack by completing 5 of 11 passes for 195 yards and two touchdowns without an interception.

Vaughn Hebron anchored the ground game, totaling 98 rushing yards and a touchdown on 13 carries.

Defensively, the Hokies forced two turnovers, including an 11-yard interception return by Tewon Stevens and a fumble recovery by Bernard Basham. The unit held the Dukes scoreless in the final period to seal the blowout.

=== East Carolina ===
Virginia Tech at East Carolina

Team	1	2	3	4	Total
Virginia Tech	3	0	14	10	27
• East Carolina	0	10	6	14	30

- Date: September 12, 1992
- Location: Ficklen Stadium, Greenville, NC
- Game attendance: 35,121
- Game weather: Sunny, 73°F, Wind 12 NE

East Carolina defeated Virginia Tech 30–27 after Michael Anderson connected with Carlester Crumpler on a 21-yard touchdown pass with 42 seconds remaining in the game. The Pirates' final scoring drive erased a late lead and spoiled a comeback effort that had seen the Hokies score 24 second-half points.

Earlier in the contest, the Pirates utilized a trick play to take a 10–3 halftime lead on a fake field goal. Virginia Tech surged ahead in the third quarter following a 40-yard interception return for a touchdown by Tyronne Drakeford and a 2-yard scoring run by Vaughn Hebron. Although the Pirates responded with a touchdown, the Hokies maintained a narrow 17–16 lead after Bernard Basham blocked the ensuing extra point.

The Hokies extended their advantage to 27–22 in the fourth quarter following another Drakeford interception and a 26-yard field goal from Ryan J. Williams.

Maurice DeShazo led the passing attack by completing 12 of 28 passes for 126 yards, while Vaughn Hebron anchored the ground game with 128 rushing yards and a touchdown. Defensively, Melendez Byrd recorded 14 total tackles, and Tyronne Drakeford finished with two interceptions, including his second-half score.

=== Temple ===
Virginia Tech at Temple

Team	1	2	3	4	Total
• Virginia Tech	7	3	7	9	26
Temple	0	7	0	0	7

- Date: September 19, 1992
- Location: Veterans Stadium, Philadelphia, PA
- Game attendance: 11,862
- Game weather: Cloudy, 69°F, Wind 14 mph N

Virginia Tech secured a 26–7 victory over Temple, sealing the win with a late 8-yard touchdown pass from Maurice DeShazo to John Rivers in the fourth quarter. The scoring drive was set up by a critical interception by Ken Brown, which halted the Owls' final attempt to close the deficit in a game marked by heavy penalties against the home team.

Earlier in the game, Vaughn Hebron gave the Hokies an initial lead with a 2-yard touchdown run in the first quarter. After Temple tied the game in the second period, Ryan J. Williams converted a 35-yard field goal to give Virginia Tech a 10–7 edge at halftime.

The Hokies extended their lead in the third quarter when Vaughn Hebron found the end zone again on an 8-yard run. Virginia Tech's defense then dominated the final period, adding a safety when Temple was called for holding in their own end zone. Prior to the final touchdown drive.

The Hokies outgained the Owls 300 to 198 in total offensive yards. Maurice DeShazo led the passing effort by completing 8 of 15 passes for 104 yards and one touchdown without an interception. Vaughn Hebron anchored the rushing attack, totaling 86 yards and two touchdowns on 22 carries.

Defensively, the Hokies recorded 2.0 sacks, with one each from Ken Brown and Jerome Preston. The unit forced two turnovers, both via interceptions by Tyronne Drakeford and Ken Brown, while holding Temple scoreless for the entire second half.

=== West Virginia ===
West Virginia at Virginia Tech

Team	1	2	3	4	Total
• West Virginia	7	0	6	3	16
Virginia Tech	0	0	0	7	7

- Date: September 26, 1992
- Location: Lane Stadium, Blacksburg, VA
- Game attendance: 51,211

West Virginia secured a 16–7 victory by neutralizing the Virginia Tech offense for three quarters and adding a late field goal to stave off a Hokie comeback. The loss marked the beginning of a five-game losing streak that defined the middle of the 1992 season, as the Hokie offense struggled to find consistency against physical Big East opponents.

Earlier in the contest, the Mountaineers established control when Jon Jones scored on an 8-yard touchdown run. West Virginia extended the lead in the third quarter with a second 9-yard touchdown run by Jones to make it 13–0. Virginia Tech's only points came on a late 83-yard touchdown pass from Treg Koel to Antonio Freeman, a play that briefly provided momentum but was ultimately neutralized by the West Virginia defense.

Koel led the passing attack by completing 6 of 14 passes for 138 yards, though the Hokie offense was held to just 214 total yards compared to 304 for the Mountaineers. Tony Kennedy anchored the rushing effort, totaling 68 yards on 18 carries. Defensively, the Hokies were led by P.J. Preston, who recorded a team-high 10 total tackles, and the unit registered sacks from Jerome Preston and Billy Swarm. Despite the defensive effort, the Hokies failed to force any turnovers, leaving the team with their first home loss of the season.

=== Louisville ===
Virginia Tech at Louisville

Team	1	2	3	4	Total
Virginia Tech	7	0	10	0	17
• Louisville	0	0	6	15	21

- Date: October 10, 1992
- Location: Cardinal Stadium, Louisville, KY
- Game attendance: 29,418
- Game weather: Cloudy, 69°F, Wind 10-12 mph W

Louisville overcame a double-digit second-half deficit to defeat Virginia Tech 21–17, taking their first lead on a 6-yard touchdown run by Jeff Brohm with 3:07 remaining in the game. The loss was a centerpiece of a "hard-luck" season where the Hokies failed to protect leads late into the fourth quarter in five separate contests, including this match where the defense struggled against a late "no-huddle" strategy they had not practiced for during the week.

Earlier in the game, Virginia Tech established a 7–0 lead when Maurice DeShazo found Antonio Freeman for an 8-yard touchdown pass. The Hokies' momentum peaked in the third quarter when Tony Kennedy recorded a 91-yard kickoff return for a touchdown—marking the first kickoff return for a score of the Frank Beamer coaching era. Following a Cardinals field goal, Ryan J. Williams converted a 23-yard field goal to extend the lead to 17–6, though the Hokies missed a later 31-yard attempt that would have pushed the margin to 14 points.

The contest featured 358 total offensive yards for Louisville compared to 319 for Virginia Tech. Despite the defensive pressure and a fourth-quarter interception by P.J. Preston that gave Tech possession at the Louisville 31-yard line, the offense could not capitalize to seal the victory.

Maurice DeShazo led the passing game by completing 11 of 24 passes for 155 yards and one touchdown with one interception. Tony Kennedy provided the primary ground production, totaling 51 yards on 14 carries in addition to his 91-yard return.

The Hokie defense recorded 6.0 sacks for 47 yards, led by Rusty Pendleton with 11 total tackles. P.J. Preston recorded a sack and the team's only takeaway with a fourth-quarter interception, while additional sacks were recorded by Melendez Byrd, Waverly Jackson, Jerome Preston, Chris Grier, and Wooster.

=== NC State ===
No. 21 NC State at Virginia Tech

Team	1	2	3	4	Total
NC State	3	0	7	3	13
Virginia Tech	0	3	7	3	13

- Date: October 17, 1992
- Location: Lane Stadium, Blacksburg, VA
- Game attendance: 43,628
- Game weather: Sunny, 48°F, Wind 5-10 mph WSW

NC State salvaged a 13–13 tie as Steve Videtich connected on a 37-yard field goal as time expired. The kick followed a 54-yard drive in the final two minutes that denied Virginia Tech an upset over the 21st-ranked Wolfpack.

The contest remained defensive through the first half, with the Wolfpack opening the scoring on a 44-yard field goal before Ryan J. Williams tied the game for the Hokies with a 42-yard kick just before halftime.

The third quarter featured an exchange of touchdowns, with NC State regaining the lead on a short run before Treg Koel found Antonio Freeman for a 52-yard touchdown pass to even the score again. The Hokies managed 296 total offensive yards against the Wolfpack's 391.

Treg Koel led the passing effort by completing 9 of 14 passes for 109 yards and one touchdown without an interception.

Tony Kennedy served as the primary rushing option, totaling 68 yards on 16 carries.

Defensively, the Hokies recorded two sacks, one from Jerome Preston and the other by Scott Wooster, while Tyronne Drakeford accounted for the team's only takeaway with an interception. Melendez Byrd led the unit with 14 total tackles.

=== Miami (FL) ===
No. 1 Miami at Virginia Tech

Team	1	2	3	4	Total
• No. 1 Miami	17	14	9	3	43
Virginia Tech	0	3	0	20	23

- Date: October 24, 1992
- Location: Lane Stadium, Blacksburg, VA
- Game attendance: 51,423
- Game weather: Sunny, 66°F, Wind 5-10 mph WSW

The top-ranked Miami Hurricanes defeated Virginia Tech 43–23, fueled by a dominant first half where they built a 31–0 lead before a late Hokie rally. Despite Virginia Tech outscoring the Hurricanes 20–3 in the fourth quarter, Miami's early efficiency and 497 total yards of offense proved too much for the home side.

Virginia Tech initially struggled to find offensive footing, falling behind early as Miami scored on their opening three possessions. The Hokies got on the scoreboard just before halftime with a 36-yard field goal by Ryan J. Williams, but they trailed by 28 points entering the break. The Hokies finished with 231 total yards of offense.

A late-game surge saw the Hokies find the end zone three times in the final period, including a 1-yard plunge by Mark Poindexter and touchdown passes from Maurice DeShazo to John Rivers and Bryan Still. The Hokies' defensive effort was highlighted by Melendez Byrd, who led the team with 16 total tackles, while P.J. Preston followed with 12.

Maurice DeShazo led the passing attack, completing 8 of 16 attempts for 75 yards and two touchdowns without an interception. Treg Koel also saw significant action, completing 4 of 15 passes for 38 yards and one interception.

Dwayne Thomas led the rushing effort with 70 yards on 16 carries, while Joe Swarm added 42 yards on just 4 attempts, including a 36-yard long.

Defensively, the Hokies recorded one sack on the day, coming from Ken Brown for a 10-yard loss. The unit did not record any interceptions or fumble recoveries, though Bernard Basham contributed with a blocked extra point in the third quarter.

=== Rutgers ===
Virginia Tech at Rutgers

Team	1	2	3	4	Total
Virginia Tech	28	7	7	7	49
• Rutgers	13	10	7	20	50

- Date: October 31, 1992
- Location: Rutgers Stadium, Piscataway, NJ
- Game attendance: 28,432
- Game weather: Cloudy, 45°F, Wind 14 mph NW

Virginia Tech suffered a heartbreaking defeat in a high-scoring Halloween shootout, falling to Rutgers on a touchdown pass as time expired.

The game began with a furious offensive display from the Hokies, who raced to a 28–7 lead in the first quarter. Mark Poindexter, Vaughn Hebron, and Tony Kennedy each recorded short rushing touchdowns before Ken Brown intercepted a Bryan Fortay pass and returned it 18 yards for a defensive score. Rutgers kept pace with a 66-yard sprint by Craig Mitter, but Maurice DeShazo extended the lead late in the first half with a 48-yard touchdown strike to Bo Campbell. DeShazo finished the day 15-of-27 passing for 302 yards and two touchdowns, though his performance was marred by four interceptions.

The Hokies appeared to be in control after the third quarter when DeShazo connected with Antonio Freeman for a 49-yard touchdown, giving Tech a 42–23 advantage. Freeman was a primary catalyst for the offense, hauling in six catches for 157 yards. The rushing attack also remained effective throughout the contest, totaling 256 net yards on 60 carries. Kennedy led all Hokie rushers with 85 yards on 20 attempts, while Poindexter added 79 yards and two rushing touchdowns. Despite these contributions, the Virginia Tech offense struggled with turnovers and penalties, including a critical 122 yards lost on 12 infractions.

The Hokie defense, despite recording 11.0 tackles for loss and 2.0 sacks, could not contain Rutgers' late-game aerial assault. Ken Brown anchored the unit with a team-high 12 tackles and an interception return, while P.J. Preston accounted for 8 total tackles, a sack, and a tackle for loss. Eugene Mays also contributed a sack in the effort.

Rutgers finished with 606 total offensive yards to Virginia Tech's 558, utilizing 387 passing yards from the combination of Fortay and Ray Lucas. The loss was a devastating blow for the Hokies, who were unable to protect a 19-point lead in the final 15 minutes of play. The defeat dropped Virginia Tech’s record to 2–5–1.

=== Syracuse ===
Virginia Tech at No. 10 Syracuse

Team	1	2	3	4	Total
Virginia Tech	3	0	6	0	9
• No. 10 Syracuse	7	7	7	7	28

- Date: November 7, 1992
- Location: Carrier Dome, Syracuse, NY
- Game attendance: 49,196
- Game weather: Indoors, 72°F

Virginia Tech struggled to find offensive rhythm in the domed environment, ultimately falling to the No. 10 Orangemen 28-9. The Hokies’ hopes for an upset were extinguished late in the fourth quarter when a 14-play, 62-yard drive ended on a failed fourth-and-20 pass at the Syracuse 26-yard line. Syracuse maintained a consistent scoring pace, recording a touchdown in every quarter while utilizing a rushing attack that outgained the Hokies 231 to 109. Despite several defensive stands, Virginia Tech was outgained in total yardage 441 to 328.

Early in the contest, Virginia Tech briefly held a lead following a 27-yard field goal by Ryan J. Williams, which capped a 16-play opening drive. The offensive highlight for the Hokies came in the third quarter when Maurice DeShazo found Tony Kennedy for a 62-yard touchdown pass. DeShazo completed 12 of 21 passes for 158 yards before giving way to Treg Koel, who finished with 61 passing yards but was intercepted once. Kennedy was the most productive individual on the ground, gaining 57 yards on five carries, and he also finished as the team's leading receiver due to his long touchdown reception. Antonio Freeman and Mark Poindexter both contributed to the aerial effort with 48 receiving yards apiece.

The Virginia Tech defense recorded 5.0 tackles for loss and 3.0 sacks. Ken Brown recorded both a tackle for loss and a sack, finishing with two sacks for 14 yards lost and an interception in the second quarter. P.J. Preston and Tyronne Drakeford tied for the team lead with eight tackles each. Preston also recorded two tackles for loss and recovered a fumble, while Drakeford added an interception in the fourth quarter. Jerome Preston accounted for the third Hokie sack. Despite forcing three turnovers, the unit was unable to stop Syracuse on critical downs, as the Orangemen converted 6 of 11 third-down attempts to secure the 28–9 win.

=== Southern Miss ===
Southern Miss at Virginia Tech

Team	1	2	3	4	Total
• Southern Miss	3	0	7	3	13
Virginia Tech	0	6	6	0	12

- Date: November 14, 1992
- Location: Lane Stadium, Blacksburg, VA
- Game attendance: 27,342
- Game weather: 37°F, Wind 8-10 W

The Golden Eagles secured a narrow 13-12 victory after Virginia Tech’s final drive stalled at the Southern Miss 36-yard line following a failed fourth-down pass attempt with less than a minute remaining. In a game defined by cold temperatures and a 25-degree wind chill, the Hokies outgained Southern Miss in total offensive yardage 402 to 345 but were unable to overcome missed scoring opportunities. Despite holding a nine-point lead late in the third quarter, Virginia Tech surrendered ten unanswered points in the final sixteen minutes of play.

Virginia Tech erased an early Southern Miss field goal in the second quarter when Maurice DeShazo threw a five-yard touchdown pass to John Rivers to cap an 8-play, 67-yard drive. Ryan J. Williams added to the lead in the third quarter by converting field goals of 31 and 35 yards, moving the score to 12–3. The momentum shifted when Southern Miss scored on a 64-yard touchdown pass late in the third quarter to cut the lead to two. The visitors eventually took the lead for good on a 22-yard field goal with 1:34 left in the contest.

Mark Poindexter led the Hokie ground game with 95 yards on 12 carries, highlighted by a 54-yard run. Dwayne Thomas rushed for 60 yards, and Joe Swarm contributed 41 yards as the team totaled 247 rushing yards. Maurice DeShazo finished with 127 passing yards and one touchdown, while Antonio Freeman was the leading receiver with 63 yards on three catches. John Rivers also recorded 49 receiving yards and the team's lone touchdown, while Bo Campbell added 35 yards through the air.

The Virginia Tech defense finished with 2.0 total tackles for loss and 2.0 sacks while forcing one fumble. Jerome Preston recorded both a tackle for loss and a sack as part of an eight-tackle performance. Tyronne Drakeford contributed the second sack for the Hokies, and Stacy Henley recorded a tackle for loss. Rusty Pendleton led the unit with nine total tackles, while P.J. Preston matched Jerome Preston with eight stops.

=== Virginia ===
Virginia at Virginia Tech

Team	1	2	3	4	Total
• Virginia	3	21	14	3	41
Virginia Tech	7	3	7	21	38

- Date: November 21, 1992
- Location: Lane Stadium, Blacksburg, VA
- Game attendance: 53,271
- Game weather: 53°F, Overcast

Virginia defeated Virginia Tech 41–38 in a high-scoring season finale after a late field goal and two interception returns for touchdowns provided the Cavaliers with a sufficient cushion to withstand a frantic fourth-quarter comeback.

Playing before a sellout crowd in Blacksburg, the Hokies outgained the visitors 573 to 344 in total offensive yardage but were plagued by five interceptions. The decisive margin arrived with just over a minute remaining when a 28-yard field goal extended the Virginia lead to 11 points, rendering a touchdown and two-point conversion on the game's final play insufficient for the Hokies.

The Hokies took an early lead when Vaughn Hebron capped an 85-yard drive with a one-yard touchdown run. After Virginia responded with a field goal and two short rushing touchdowns to take a 17–7 lead, Ryan J. Williams converted a 21-yard field goal to pull the Hokies within a score. However, a 38-yard touchdown pass and two 30-plus yard interception returns by the Virginia defense pushed the deficit to 38–17 by the end of the third quarter.

Virginia Tech rallied in the final period with an eight-yard scoring run by Mark Poindexter and a two-yard rush by Joe Swarm, but a late Virginia field goal halted the momentum before Ray Crittenden caught a 24-yard touchdown pass as time expired and Tony Kennedy converted on the two-point conversion run.

Vaughn Hebron anchored the rushing attack with 143 yards on 21 carries, while Tony Kennedy and Mark Poindexter each added 52 yards on the ground. Maurice DeShazo completed 16 of 35 passes for 266 yards and two touchdowns, though he was intercepted four times. Bryan Still led the receiving corps with 53 yards on two catches, while Ray Crittenden recorded 47 yards and a score. Other significant contributors included John Burke with 38 yards and John Rivers, who caught a 31-yard pass during the final scoring drive.

The Virginia Tech defense recorded 1.0 tackle for loss and 1.0 sack during the contest. P.J. Preston was responsible for the team's defensive highlights in the backfield, registering the lone sack and tackle for loss as part of an 11-tackle performance. Rusty Pendleton led all defenders with 14 total stops, while Melendez Byrd also reached double digits with 11 tackles. Tyronne Drakeford contributed eight tackles and recorded the unit's only interception, which he returned 25 yards.
