= 1992 Southwestern Louisiana Ragin' Cajuns football team =

American college football season

1992 Southwestern Louisiana Ragin' Cajuns football
- Conference: Independent
- Record: 2–9
- Head coach: Nelson Stokley (7th season)
- Offensive coordinator: Lewis Cook (1st season)
- Defensive coordinator: Ron West (7th season)
- Home stadium: Cajun Field

1992 NCAA Division I-A independents football records
	Conf.			Overall
Team	W	L	T	W		L		T
No. 4 Notre Dame		–		10	–	1	–	1
Southern Miss		–		7	–	4	–	0
Penn State		–		7	–	5	–	0
Memphis State		–		6	–	5	–	0
Army		–		5	–	6	–	0
East Carolina		–		5	–	6	–	0
Louisiana Tech		–		5	–	6	–	0
Louisville		–		5	–	6	–	0
Northern Illinois		–		5	–	6	–	0
Tulsa		–		4	–	7	–	0
Cincinnati		–		3	–	8	–	0
Arkansas State		–		2	–	9	–	0
Southwestern Louisiana		–		2	–	9	–	0
Tulane		–		2	–	9	–	0
Navy		–		1	–	10	–	0
Rankings from AP Poll

The 1992 Southwestern Louisiana Ragin' Cajuns football team was an American football team that represented the University of Southwestern Louisiana (now known as the University of Louisiana at Lafayette) as an independent during the 1992 NCAA Division I-A football season. In their seventh year under head coach Nelson Stokley, the team compiled a 2–9 record.

== Schedule ==
Date	Time	Opponent	Site	Result	Attendance	Source
September 5	12:00 p.m.	at No. 22 Tennessee	Neyland Stadium; Knoxville, TN	L 3–38	95,110	
September 12	7:00 p.m.	No. 7 Northeast Louisiana	Cajun Field; Lafayette, LA (rivalry)	W 31–23	23,742	
September 19		at San Jose State	Spartan Stadium; San Jose, CA	L 13–36	14,322	
September 26		Western Kentucky	Cajun Field; Lafayette, LA	W 17–14	20,049	
October 3		at Houston	Rice Stadium; Houston, TX	L 7–63	17,123	
October 10		at Louisiana Tech	Joe Aillet Stadium; Ruston, LA (rivalry)	L 7–21	17,800	
October 17		Cal State Fullerton	Cajun Field; Lafayette, LA	L 10–14	15,137	
October 24	1:00 p.m.	at Auburn	Jordan–Hare Stadium; Auburn, AL	L 24–25	74,327	
October 31		at Tulsa	Skelly Stadium; Tulsa, OK	L 9–27	19,073	
November 7		at Northern Illinois	Cajun Field; Lafayette, LA	L 15–23	19,183	
November 21		Arkansas State	Cajun Field; Lafayette, LA	L 7–20 (Note: Game stopped in the fourth quarter due to lightning.)	14,000	
Rankings from AP Poll released prior to the game; All times are in Central time
