= 1992 Tulsa Golden Hurricane football team =

American college football season

1992 Tulsa Golden Hurricane football
- Conference: Independent
- Record: 4–7
- Head coach: David Rader (5th season)
- Offensive coordinator: Rockey Felker (2nd season)
- Defensive coordinator: Mike Knoll (4th season)
- Home stadium: Skelly Stadium

1992 NCAA Division I-A independents football records
| | Conf. | | | Overall |
| Team | W | L | T | W | | L | | T |
|---|---|---|---|---|---|---|---|---|
| No. 4 Notre Dame | | – | | 10 | – | 1 | – | 1 |
| Southern Miss | | – | | 7 | – | 4 | – | 0 |
| Penn State | | – | | 7 | – | 5 | – | 0 |
| Memphis State | | – | | 6 | – | 5 | – | 0 |
| Army | | – | | 5 | – | 6 | – | 0 |
| East Carolina | | – | | 5 | – | 6 | – | 0 |
| Louisiana Tech | | – | | 5 | – | 6 | – | 0 |
| Louisville | | – | | 5 | – | 6 | – | 0 |
| Northern Illinois | | – | | 5 | – | 6 | – | 0 |
| Tulsa | | – | | 4 | – | 7 | – | 0 |
| Cincinnati | | – | | 3 | – | 8 | – | 0 |
| Arkansas State | | – | | 2 | – | 9 | – | 0 |
| Southwestern Louisiana | | – | | 2 | – | 9 | – | 0 |
| Tulane | | – | | 2 | – | 9 | – | 0 |
| Navy | | – | | 1 | – | 10 | – | 0 |
Rankings from AP Poll

The 1992 Tulsa Golden Hurricane football team represented the University of Tulsa during the 1992 NCAA Division I-A football season. In their fifth year under head coach David Rader, the Golden Hurricane compiled a 4–7 record. The team's statistical leaders included quarterback Gus Frerotte with 1,467 passing yards, Lamont Headd with 827 rushing yards, and Gary Brown with 560 receiving yards.

== Schedule ==
| Date | Opponent | Site | Result | Attendance | Source |
|---|---|---|---|---|---|
| September 5 | Houston | Skelly Stadium; Tulsa, OK | W 28–25 | 33,619 | |
| September 12 | at Texas A&M | Kyle Field; College Station, TX | L 9–19 | 58,926 | |
| September 19 | Kansas | Skelly Stadium; Tulsa, OK | L 7–40 | 34,986 | |
| September 26 | at Oklahoma State | Lewis Field; Stillwater, OK (rivalry) | L 19–24 | 47,280 | |
| October 3 | at Southern Miss | M. M. Roberts Stadium; Hattiesburg, MS | L 24–33 | 18,253 | |
| October 10 | No. 16 Southwest Missouri State^{†} | Skelly Stadium; Tulsa, OK | W 17–14 | 21,856 | |
| October 17 | at Louisville | Cardinal Stadium; Louisville, KY | L 27–32 | 29,517 | |
| October 24 | Memphis State | Skelly Stadium; Tulsa, OK | L 25–30 | 20,142 | |
| October 31 | Southwestern Louisiana | Skelly Stadium; Tulsa, OK | W 27–9 | 19,073 | |
| November 7 | UTEP | Skelly Stadium; Tulsa, OK | W 48–39 | 19,624 | |
| November 28 | at Hawaii | Aloha Stadium; Halawa, HI | L 9–38 | 35,217 | |
^{†}Homecoming; Rankings from AP Poll released prior to the game

== Roster ==
1992 Tulsa Golden Hurricane football team roster
Players
Coaches
Offense

| Pos. | # | Name | Class |
|---|---|---|---|
| QB | 12 | Gus Frerotte | Jr |
| WR | 86 | Chris Penn |

Defense

| Pos. | # | Name | Class |
|---|---|---|---|
| LB | 24 | Barry Minter | Sr |

Special teams

| Pos. | # | Name | Class |

Head coach

- David Rader

Coordinators/assistant coaches

- George Small (Defensive line)

Legend

- (C) Team captain
- (S) Suspended
- (I) Ineligible
- Injured
- Redshirt

== After the season ==
=== 1993 NFL draft ===
The following Golden Hurricane player was selected in the 1993 NFL draft following the season.

| Round | Pick | Player | Position | NFL club |
|---|---|---|---|---|
| 6 | 168 | Barry Minter | Linebacker | Dallas Cowboys |
