= 1992 Louisiana Tech Bulldogs football team =

American college football season

1992 Louisiana Tech Bulldogs football
- Conference: Independent
- Record: 5–6
- Head coach: Joe Raymond Peace (5th season)
- Defensive coordinator: Art Kaufman (1st season)
- Captains: Myron Baker; Willie Roaf
- Home stadium: Joe Aillet Stadium

1992 NCAA Division I-A independents football records
	Conf.			Overall
Team	W	L	T	W		L		T
No. 4 Notre Dame		–		10	–	1	–	1
Southern Miss		–		7	–	4	–	0
Penn State		–		7	–	5	–	0
Memphis State		–		6	–	5	–	0
Army		–		5	–	6	–	0
East Carolina		–		5	–	6	–	0
Louisiana Tech		–		5	–	6	–	0
Louisville		–		5	–	6	–	0
Northern Illinois		–		5	–	6	–	0
Tulsa		–		4	–	7	–	0
Cincinnati		–		3	–	8	–	0
Arkansas State		–		2	–	9	–	0
Southwestern Louisiana		–		2	–	9	–	0
Tulane		–		2	–	9	–	0
Navy		–		1	–	10	–	0
Rankings from AP Poll

The 1992 Louisiana Tech Bulldogs football team was an American football team that represented Louisiana Tech University as an independent during the 1992 NCAA Division I-A football season. In their fifth year under head coach Joe Raymond Peace, the team compiled an 5–6 record.

== Schedule ==
Date	Opponent	Site	Result	Attendance	Source
September 5	at Baylor	Floyd Casey Stadium; Waco, TX	W 10–9	33,434	
September 12	Eastern Michigan	Joe Aillet Stadium; Ruston, LA	W 31–17	21,450	
September 19	at Southern Miss	M. M. Roberts Stadium; Hattiesburg, MS (Rivalry in Dixie)	L 13–16	15,168	
September 26	at No. 7 Alabama	Legion Field; Birmingham, AL	L 0–13	77,622	
October 3	at Fresno State	Bulldog Stadium; Fresno, CA	L 14–48	33,934	
October 10	Southwestern Louisiana	Joe Aillet Stadium; Ruston, LA (rivalry)	W 21–7	17,800	
October 17	East Tennessee State	Joe Aillet Stadium; Ruston, LA	W 65–7	17,000	
October 31	Arkansas State	Joe Aillet Stadium; Ruston, LA	W 23–0	14,200	
November 7	at South Carolina	Williams–Brice Stadium; Columbia, SC	L 13–14	57,547	
November 14	at Ole Miss	Vaught–Hemingway Stadium; Oxford, MS	L 6–13	22,500	
November 21	at West Virginia	Mountaineer Field; Morgantown, WV	L 3–23	27,751	
Rankings from AP Poll released prior to the game; Source:
