= 1992 Southern Miss Golden Eagles football team =

American college football season

1992 Southern Miss Golden Eagles football
- Conference: Independent
- Record: 7–4
- Head coach: Jeff Bower (2nd season)
- Offensive scheme: I formation
- Defensive coordinator: John Thompson (1st season)
- Base defense: Multiple
- Home stadium: M. M. Roberts Stadium

1992 NCAA Division I-A independents football records
	Conf.			Overall
Team	W	L	T	W		L		T
No. 4 Notre Dame		–		10	–	1	–	1
Southern Miss		–		7	–	4	–	0
Penn State		–		7	–	5	–	0
Memphis State		–		6	–	5	–	0
Army		–		5	–	6	–	0
East Carolina		–		5	–	6	–	0
Louisiana Tech		–		5	–	6	–	0
Louisville		–		5	–	6	–	0
Northern Illinois		–		5	–	6	–	0
Tulsa		–		4	–	7	–	0
Cincinnati		–		3	–	8	–	0
Arkansas State		–		2	–	9	–	0
Southwestern Louisiana		–		2	–	9	–	0
Tulane		–		2	–	9	–	0
Navy		–		1	–	10	–	0
Rankings from AP Poll

The 1992 Southern Miss Golden Eagles football team was an American football team that represented the University of Southern Mississippi as an independent during the 1992 NCAA Division I-A football season. In their second year under head coach Jeff Bower, the team compiled a 7–4 record.

== Schedule ==
Date	Opponent	Site	Result	Attendance	Source
September 5	Memphis State	M. M. Roberts Stadium; Hattiesburg, MS (rivalry)	W 23–21	16,059	
September 12	at No. 8 Alabama	Legion Field; Birmingham, AL	L 10–17	83,091	
September 19	Louisiana Tech	M. M. Roberts Stadium; Hattiesburg, MS (rivalry)	W 16–13	15,168	
September 26	at Auburn	Jordan–Hare Stadium; Auburn, AL	L 8–16	72,296	
October 3	Tulsa^{†}	M. M. Roberts Stadium; Hattiesburg, MS	W 33–24	18,253	
October 10	at Northern Illinois	Huskie Stadium; DeKalb, IL	L 10–23	14,246	
October 15	at Tulane	Louisiana Superdome; New Orleans, LA (rivalry)	W 17–7	21,760	
October 24	Cincinnati	M. M. Roberts Stadium; Hattiesburg, MS	W 31–17	17,298	
October 29	at East Carolina	Ficklen Memorial Stadium; Greenville, NC	W 38–21	33,249	
November 7	at No. 14 Florida	Ben Hill Griffin Stadium; Gainesville, FL	L 20–24	82,882	
November 14	at Virginia Tech	Lane Stadium; Blacksburg, VA	W 13–12	27,342	
^{†}Homecoming; Rankings from AP Poll released prior to the game
