= Greg Huntington =

American football player (born 1970)

No. 60, 78, 66, 67
- Positions: Center, guard

Personal information
- Born: September 22, 1970 (age 56); Morristown, New Jersey, U.S.
- Listed height: 6 ft 4 in (1.93 m)
- Listed weight: 300 lb (136 kg)

Career information
- High school: Archbishop Moeller (Cincinnati, Ohio)
- College: Penn State
- NFL draft: 1993: 5th round, 128th overall pick

Career history
- Washington Redskins (1993); Jacksonville Jaguars (1995–1996); Chicago Bears (1997–1999); Pittsburgh Steelers (2000)*
- * Offseason or practice squad member only

Career NFL statistics
- Games played: 18
- Stats at Pro Football Reference

Gregory Gerard Huntington (born September 22, 1970) is an American former professional football player who was a center in the National Football League (NFL) for the Washington Redskins, the Jacksonville Jaguars, and the Chicago Bears. He played college football for the Penn State Nittany Lions and was selected in the fifth round of the 1993 NFL draft.
