= Mack Travis =

American football player (born 1970)

No. 92, 94
- Position: Nose tackle

Personal information
- Born: July 3, 1970 (age 56); Las Vegas, Nevada, U.S.
- Listed height: 6 ft 1 in (1.85 m)
- Listed weight: 280 lb (127 kg)

Career information
- High school: Valley (Winchester, Nevada)
- College: California
- NFL draft: 1993: undrafted

Career history
- Detroit Lions (1993); Rhein Fire (1995)

Awards and highlights
- Second-team All-Pac-10 (1991)

Career NFL statistics
- Games played: 4
- Stats at Pro Football Reference

Mack Henry Travis Jr. (born July 3, 1970) is an American former professional football player who was a nose tackle in the National Football League (NFL) for the Detroit Lions for four games in 1993. He played college football for the California Golden Bears.
