= TCU Horned Frogs football statistical leaders =

The TCU Horned Frogs football statistical leaders are individual statistical leaders of the TCU Horned Frogs football program in various categories, including passing, rushing, receiving, total offense, defensive stats, and kicking. Within those areas, the lists identify single-game, single-season, and career leaders. The Horned Frogs represent Texas Christian University in the NCAA Division I FBS Big 12 Conference.

Although TCU began competing in intercollegiate football in 1896, the school's official record book does not generally include records from the 1930s and before, as records from before this year are often incomplete and inconsistent. These lists are dominated by more recent players for several reasons:

- Since the 1930s, seasons have increased from 10 games to 11 and then 12 games in length.
- The NCAA didn't allow freshmen to play varsity football until 1972 (with the exception of the World War II years), allowing players to have four-year careers.
- Bowl games only began counting toward single-season and career statistics in 2002. Since then, the Horned Frogs have played in at least one bowl game in 14 seasons, and played two bowl games in the 2022 season, having played in the 2023 College Football Playoff National Championship. This has provided players in these seasons at least one additional game to accumulate statistics.
- The Big 12 has held a championship game at two different times—1996–2010 and 2017–present. The Horned Frogs played in the 2017 and 2022 editions, giving players in those seasons yet another game to accumulate statistics.
- Due to COVID-19 issues, the NCAA ruled that the 2020 season would not count against any football player's athletic eligibility, giving all who played in that season the opportunity for five years of eligibility instead of the normal four.
- All of TCU's 10 highest seasons ranked by total offensive yards have come during the 21st century. The Horned Frogs obliterated its school record in 2014, accumulating 6,929 yards of total offense after switching to an air raid offense. The Horned Frogs broke this record in 2015 by putting up 7,317 yards.

These lists are updated through the 2025 season.

== Passing ==
=== Passing yards ===
Career
Rank	Player	Yards	Years
1	Trevone Boykin	10,728	2012 2013 2014 2015
2	Andy Dalton	10,314	2007 2008 2009 2010
3	Josh Hoover	9,629	2022 2023 2024 2025
4	Max Duggan	9,618	2019 2020 2021 2022
5	Max Knake	7,370	1992 1993 1994 1995
6	Kenny Hill	6,360	2016 2017
7	Casey Pachall	5,415	2010 2011 2012 2013
8	Steve Stamp	5,123	1978 1979 1980 1981
9	Casey Printers	4,621	1999 2000 2001 2002
10	Jeff Ballard	4,204	2003 2004 2005 2006

Single season
Rank	Player	Yards	Year
1	Josh Hoover	3,949	2024
2	Trevone Boykin	3,901	2014
3	Max Duggan	3,698	2022
4	Trevone Boykin	3,575	2015
5	Josh Hoover	3,472	2025
6	Kenny Hill	3,208	2016
7	Kenny Hill	3,152	2017
8	Casey Pachall	2,921	2011
9	Andy Dalton	2,857	2010
10	Andy Dalton	2,756	2009

Single game
Rank	Player	Yards	Year	Opponent
1	Matt Vogler	690	1990	Houston
2	Trevone Boykin	485	2015	Texas Tech
3	Casey Pachall	473	2011	Boise State
4	Chandler Morris	461	2021	Baylor
5	Trevone Boykin	460	2014	Iowa State
6	Trevone Boykin	454	2015	SMU
7	Kenny Hill	452	2016	SMU
8	Kenny Hill	449	2016	Oklahoma
9	Trevone Boykin	445	2015	Oklahoma State
10	Kenny Hill	439	2016	South Dakota State
	Josh Hoover	439	2023	BYU

=== Passing touchdowns ===
Career
Rank	Player	TDs	Years
1	Trevone Boykin	86	2012 2013 2014 2015
2	Max Duggan	73	2019 2020 2021 2022
3	Andy Dalton	71	2007 2008 2009 2010
	Josh Hoover	71	2022 2023 2024 2025
5	Max Knake	49	1992 1993 1994 1995
6	Casey Pachall	42	2010 2011 2012 2013
7	Sammy Baugh	40	1934 1935 1936
8	Kenny Hill	40	2016 2017
9	Casey Printers	37	1999 2000 2001
10	Steve Stamp	34	1978 1979 1980 1981

Single season
Rank	Player	TDs	Year
1	Trevone Boykin	33	2014
2	Max Duggan	32	2022
3	Trevone Boykin	31	2015
4	Josh Hoover	29	2025
5	Andy Dalton	27	2010
	Josh Hoover	27	2024
7	Casey Pachall	25	2011
8	Max Knake	24	1994
9	Andy Dalton	23	2009
	Kenny Hill	23	2017

Single game
Rank	Player	TDs	Year	Opponent
1	Trevone Boykin	7	2014	Texas Tech
2	Steve Stamp	5	1981	Texas-Arlington
	Matt Vogler	5	1990	Houston
	Jeff Ballard	5	2006	San Diego State
	Casey Pachall	5	2011	Boise State
	Trevone Boykin	5	2015	SMU
	Trevone Boykin	5	2015	Texas
	Kenny Hill	5	2016	Oklahoma
	Kenny Hill	5	2017	Kansas
	Max Duggan	5	2022	Tarleton
	Josh Hoover	5	2025	SMU

== Rushing ==
=== Rushing yards ===
Career
Rank	Player	Yards	Years
1	LaDainian Tomlinson	5,263	1997 1998 1999 2000
2	Tony Jeffery	3,749	1984 1985 1986 1987
3	Andre Davis	3,182	1992 1993 1994 1995
4	Lonta Hobbs	3,071	2002 2003 2004 2005 2006
5	Kenneth Davis	2,994	1982 1983 1984 1985
6	Basil Mitchell	2,783	1994 1996 1997 1998
7	Robert Merrill	2,771	2003 2004 2005
8	Curtis Modkins	2,763	1989 1990 1991 1992
9	Jim Swink	2,618	1954 1955 1956
10	Matthew Tucker	2,602	2009 2010 2011 2012

Single season
Rank	Player	Yards	Year
1	LaDainian Tomlinson	2,158	2000
2	LaDainian Tomlinson	1,850	1999
3	Kenneth Davis	1,611	1984
4	Andre Davis	1,494	1994
5	Kendre Miller	1,399	2022
6	Tony Jeffery	1,353	1987
7	Jim Swink	1,283	1955
8	Aaron Green	1,272	2015
9	Emani Bailey	1,209	2023
10	Basil Mitchell	1,111	1998

Single game
Rank	Player	Yards	Year	Opponent
1	LaDainian Tomlinson	406	1999	UTEP
2	Tony Jeffery	343	1986	Tulane
3	Andre Davis	325	1994	New Mexico
4	LaDainian Tomlinson	305	2000	UTEP
5	LaDainian Tomlinson	300	1999	San Jose State
6	LaDainian Tomlinson	294	2000	Hawaii
7	Lonta Hobbs	287	2002	Memphis
8	LaDainian Tomlinson	269	1999	Arkansas State
9	Bobby Davis	247	1970	Texas-Arlington
10	LaDainian Tomlinson	243	2000	Northwestern

=== Rushing touchdowns ===
Career
Rank	Player	TDs	Years
1	LaDainian Tomlinson	54	1997 1998 1999 2000
2	Lonta Hobbs	38	2002 2003 2004 2005
3	Matthew Tucker	33	2009 2010 2011 2012
4	Tony Jeffery	31	1984 1985 1986 1987
5	Joseph Turner	29	2006 2007 2008 2009
6	Jim Swink	28	1954 1955 1956
	Max Duggan	28	2019 2020 2021 2022
8	Trevone Boykin	27	2012 2013 2014 2015
9	Kendre Miller	26	2020 2021 2022
10	Kenneth Davis	23	1982 1983 1984 1985

Single season
Rank	Player	TDs	Year
1	LaDainian Tomlinson	22	2000
2	Jim Swink	18	1955
	LaDainian Tomlinson	18	1999
4	Kendre Miller	17	2022
5	Kenneth Davis	15	1984
6	Cy Leland	13	1929
7	Richard Oliver	12	1932
	Lonta Hobbs	12	2002
	Matthew Tucker	12	2011

Single game
Rank	Player	TDs	Year	Opponent
1	LaDainian Tomlinson	6	1999	UTEP
2	Tony Jeffery	5	1986	Tulane
3	Harold McClure	4	1936	Texas
	Bobby Jack Floyd	4	1950	Rice
	Jim Swink	4	1955	Texas
	Ross Montgomery	4	1967	Baylor
	Andre Davis	4	1993	New Mexico
	LaDainian Tomlinson	4	1999	Tulsa
	LaDainian Tomlinson	4	2000	Hawaii
	Jeff Ballard	4	2005	New Mexico
	Joseph Turner	4	2007	San Diego State

== Receiving ==
=== Receptions ===
Career
Rank	Player	Rec	Years
1	Kelly Blackwell	181	1988 1989 1990 1991
2	Josh Doctson	180	2013 2014 2015
3	Mike Renfro	162	1974 1975 1976 1977
4	Josh Boyce	161	2010 2011 2012
5	Taye Barber	159	2018 2019 2020 2021 2022
6	Steven Shipley	152	1989 1990 1991 1992
7	Cory Rodgers	150	2003 2004 2005
8	Jalen Reagor	148	2017 2018 2019
9	Jimmy Young	147	2007 2008 2009 2010
10	KaVontae Turpin	145	2015 2016 2017 2018

Single season
Rank	Player	Rec	Year
1	Josh Doctson	79	2015
2	Jalen Reagor	72	2018
	Eric McAlister	72	2025
4	Josh Boyce	66	2012
5	Josh Doctson	65	2014
6	Kelly Blackwell	64	1990
	Kelly Blackwell	64	1991
8	Jack Bech	62	2024
9	Cory Rodgers	61	2004
	Josh Boyce	61	2011

Single game
Rank	Player	Rec	Year	Opponent
1	Richard Woodley	18	1990	Texas Tech
	Josh Doctson	18	2015	Texas Tech
3	Richard Woodley	15	1990	Houston
4	Quentin Johnston	14	2022	Kansas
	Kari Ashley	14	2026	Arizona
6	Jason Tucker	13	1995	Kansas
7	Morris Bailey	12	1949	Oklahoma A&M
	Andre Davis	12	1983	SMU
	Kelly Blackwell	12	1990	Missouri
	John Washington	12	1995	SMU
	Josh Doctson	12	2015	West Virginia

=== Receiving yards ===
Career
Rank	Player	Yards	Years
1	Josh Doctson	2,785	2013 2014 2015
2	Mike Renfro	2,739	1974 1975 1976 1977
3	Josh Boyce	2,535	2010 2011 2012
4	Jimmy Young	2,316	2007 2008 2009 2010
5	Stephen Shipley	2,251	1989 1990 1991 1992
6	Jalen Reagor	2,248	2017 2018 2019
7	Stanley Washington	2,209	1979 1980 1981 1982
8	James Maness	2,171	1981 1982 1983 1984
9	Quentin Johnston	2,168	2020 2021 2022
10	Kelly Blackwell	2,155	1988 1989 1990 1991

Single season
Rank	Player	Yards	Year
1	Josh Doctson	1,327	2015
2	Eric McAlister	1,190	2025
3	Quentin Johnston	1,069	2022
4	Jalen Reagor	1,061	2018
5	Jack Bech	1,034	2024
6	Josh Doctson	1,018	2014
7	Reggie Harrell	1,012	2003
8	Josh Boyce	998	2011
9	Jimmy Young	988	2008
10	Josh Boyce	891	2012

Single game
Rank	Player	Yards	Year	Opponent
1	Josh Doctson	267	2015	Texas Tech
2	Eric McAlister	254	2025	SMU
3	Jimmy Young	226	2008	Wyoming
4	Josh Doctson	225	2014	Oklahoma State
5	Taj Williams	210	2016	Oklahoma
6	Jimmy Oliver	206	1994	Texas Tech
	Quentin Johnston	206	2022	Kansas
8	Vernon Wells	204	1976	Tennessee
9	James Maness	202	1984	Rice
10	Jack Bech	200	2024	UCF

=== Receiving touchdowns ===
Career
Rank	Player	TDs	Years
1	Josh Doctson	29	20112013 2014 2015
2	Josh Boyce	22	2010 2011 2012
	Jalen Reagor	22	2017 2018 2019
4	Mike Renfro	17	1974 1975 1976 1977
	Cory Rodgers	17	2003 2004 2005
6	Stanley Washington	16	1979 1980 1981 1982
7	Stephen Shipley	15	1989 1990 1991 1992
	Eric McAlister	15	2024 2025
9	Quentin Johnston	14	2020 2021 2022
	Savion Williams	14	2020 2021 2022 2023 2024

Single season
Rank	Player	TDs	Year
1	Josh Doctson	14	2015
2	Josh Doctson	11	2014
3	Mike Renfro	10	1977
	Jeremy Kerley	10	2010
	Eric McAlister	10	2025
6	Josh Boyce	9	2011
	Jalen Reagor	9	2018
	Jack Bech	9	2024
9	Stanley Washington	8	1980
	Mike Scarborough	8	1999
	Deanté Gray	8	2014
	KaVontae Turpin	8	2015
	Jalen Reagor	8	2017
	Jared Wiley	8	2023

== Total offense ==
Total offense is the sum of passing and rushing statistics. It does not include receiving or returns.

=== Total offense yards ===
Career
Rank	Player	Yards	Years
1	Trevone Boykin	12,777	2012 2013 2014 2015
2	Andy Dalton	11,925	2007 2008 2009 2010
3	Max Duggan	11,474	2019 2020 2021 2022
4	Josh Hoover	9,619	2022 2023 2024 2025
5	Kenny Hill	7,294	2016 2017
6	Max Knake	7,150	1992 1993 1994 1995
7	Casey Pachall	5,607	2010 2011 2012 2013
8	LaDainian Tomlinson	5,263	1997 1998 1999 2000
9	Jeff Ballard	4,940	2003 2004 2005 2006
10	Casey Printers	4,904	1999 2000 2001 2002

Single season
Rank	Player	Yards	Year
1	Trevone Boykin	4,608	2014
2	Trevone Boykin	4,187	2015
3	Max Duggan	4,121	2022
4	Josh Hoover	3,930	2024
5	Kenny Hill	3,817	2016
6	Kenny Hill	3,477	2017
7	Josh Hoover	3,476	2025
8	Andy Dalton	3,292	2010
9	Andy Dalton	3,268	2009
10	Casey Pachall	2,972	2011

Single game
Rank	Player	Yards	Year	Opponent
1	Matt Vogler	696	1990	Houston
2	Chandler Morris	531	2021	Baylor
3	Trevone Boykin	527	2015	Texas Tech
4	Trevone Boykin	518	2015	Oklahoma State
5	Trevone Boykin	510	2015	Iowa State
6	Trevone Boykin	504	2014	Iowa State
	Trevone Boykin	504	2015	SMU
8	Kenny Hill	484	2016	South Dakota State
9	Trevone Boykin	473	2015	West Virginia
10	Josh Hoover	465	2023	BYU

=== Touchdowns responsible for ===
"Touchdowns responsible for" is the official NCAA term for combined passing and rushing touchdowns.

Career
Rank	Player	TDs	Years
1	Trevone Boykin	113	2012 2013 2014 2015
2	Max Duggan	101	2019 2020 2021 2022
3	Andy Dalton	93	2007 2008 2009 2010
4	Josh Hoover	79	2022 2023 2024 2025
5	Kenny Hill	55	2016 2017
6	LaDainian Tomlinson	54	1997 1998 1999 2000
7	Max Knake	51	1992 1993 1994 1995
8	Casey Pachall	47	2010 2011 2012 2013
9	Casey Printers	45	1999 2000 2001 2002
10	Sammy Baugh	44	1934 1935 1936

Single season
Rank	Player	TDs	Year
1	Trevone Boykin	41	2014
	Max Duggan	41	2022
3	Trevone Boykin	40	2015
4	Andy Dalton	33	2010
5	Josh Hoover	31	2024
	Josh Hoover	31	2025
7	Kenny Hill	28	2017
8	Casey Pachall	27	2011
	Kenny Hill	27	2016
10	Andy Dalton	26	2009

Single game
Rank	Player	TDs	Year	Opponent
1	Trevone Boykin	7	2014	Texas Tech
2	LaDainian Tomlinson	6	1999	UTEP
	Jeff Ballard	6	2005	New Mexico
	Jeff Ballard	6	2006	San Diego State
	Trevone Boykin	6	2014	SMU
	Trevone Boykin	6	2015	SMU

== Defense ==
=== Interceptions ===
Career
Rank	Player	Ints	Years
1	Ronald Fraley	18	1951 1952 1953
2	Jimmy Lawrence	16	1933 1934 1935
	Davey O'Brien	16	1936 1937 1938
4	Falanda Newton	15	1985 1986 1987 1988
	Bud Clark	15	2020 2021 2022 2023 2024 2025
6	Greg Evans	14	1990 1991 1992 1993
	Jason Goss	14	1999 2000 2001 2002
8	Darrell Lester	13	1933 1934 1935

Single season
Rank	Player	Ints	Year
1	Ronald Fraley	8	1952
	Sean Thomas	8	1984
	Jason Goss	8	2002

=== Tackles ===
Career
Rank	Player	Tackles	Years
1	Darrell Patterson	544	1979 1980 1981 1982
2	Reggie Anderson	392	1990 1991 1993 1994
3	Kent Tramel	391	1983 1984 1985 1986 1987
4	Lenoy Jones	382	1992 1993 1994 1995
5	Falanda Newton	374	1985 1986 1987 1988
6	Brad Smith	371	1989 1990 1991 1992
7	Kelvin Newton	366	1977 1978 1979 1980
8	Kevin Dean	365	1983 1984 1985 1986
9	Jim Bayuk	361	1977 1978 1979 1980
10	Greg Evans	358	1990 1991 1992 1993

Single season
Rank	Player	Tackles	Year
1	Kyle Clifton	189	1983
2	Darrell Patterson	179	1980
3	Kelvin Newton	167	1980
4	Jim Bayuk	161	1978
5	Joseph Phipps	153	1998
6	Reggie Anderson	144	1993
7	Joe Hines	139	1981
	Kevin Dean	139	1985
9	Scott Harris	138	1985
10	Floyd Terrell	136	1987
	Paul Dawson	136	2014

Single game
Rank	Player	Tackles	Year	Opponent
1	Kyle Clifton	30	1983	Houston
	Scott Taft	30	1997	UTEP
3	Scott Harris	29	1985	Kansas State
4	Charlie Abel	27	1977	Baylor
5	Jim Bayuk	25	1978	Texas A&M
6	Kyle Clifton	23	1983	Texas
	Kyle Clifton	23	1983	SMU
	Kevin Dean	23	1985	North Texas
	Ty Summers	23	2015	Baylor
10	Joe Hines	22	1982	SMU

=== Sacks ===
Career
Rank	Player	Sacks	Years
1	Aaron Schobel	31.0	1997 1998 1999 2000
2	Jerry Hughes	28.5	2006 2007 2008 2009
	Bo Schobel	28.5	2000 2001 2002 2003
4	Tommy Blake	23.0	2004 2005 2006 2007
5	Royal West	22.0	1991 1992 1993 1994
6	Chase Ortiz	20.5	2004 2005 2006 2007
7	Josh Carraway	19.0	2012 2014 2015 2016
8	Roosevelt Collins	18.0	1988 1989 1990 1991

Single season
Rank	Player	Sacks	Year
1	Bo Schobel	17.0	2003
2	Jerry Hughes	15.0	2008
3	Jerry Hughes	11.5	2009
	Mat Boesen	11.5	2017
5	Aaron Schobel	10.0	1999
	Devonte Fields	10.0	2012
	Dylan Horton	10.0	2022
8	Chris Piland	9.5	1995
9	Royal West	9.0	1993
	Chase Ortiz	9.0	2005
	Chase Ortiz	9.0	2007
	Stansly Maponga	9.0	2011
	Ochaun Mathis	9.0	2020

Single game
Rank	Player	Sacks	Year	Opponent
1	Mat Boesen	5.5	2017	Baylor
2	David Spradlin	4.5	1987	Baylor
	Vincent Pryor	4.5	1994	Texas Tech
4	Jerry Hughes	4.0	2008	BYU
	Dylan Horton	4.0	2022	Michigan (Fiesta Bowl)

== Kicking ==
=== Field goals made ===
Career
Rank	Player	FGs	Years
1	Jaden Oberkrom	79	2012 2013 2014 2015
2	Nick Browne	65	2001 2002 2003
3	Griffin Kell	60	2019 2020 2021 2022 2023
4	Michael Reeder	57	1994 1995 1996 1997
5	Ross Evans	56	2008 2009 2010 2011
6	Chris Manfredini	47	2005 2006 2007
7	Chris Kaylakie	41	1998 1999 2000
8	Jonathan Song	40	2015 2017 2018 2019
9	Greg Porter	38	1978 1979 1980 1981
10	Ken Ozee	35	1982 1983 1984 1985
	Lee Newman	35	1986 1987 1988

Single season
Rank	Player	FGs	Year
1	Nick Browne	28	2003
2	Michael Reeder	23	1995
	Nick Browne	23	2002
	Jonathan Song	23	2019
5	Chris Manfredini	22	2007
	Jaden Oberkrom	22	2012
	Jaden Oberkrom	22	2014
8	Jaden Oberkrom	21	2015
9	Griffin Kell	17	2022
10	Lee Newman	16	1986
	Chris Kaylakie	16	2000
	Ross Evans	16	2008

Single game
Rank	Player	FGs	Year	Opponent
1	Jaden Oberkrom	6	2012	Texas Tech
2	Nick Browne	5	2002	Cincinnati
	Nick Browne	5	2003	Cincinnati
	Jonathan Song	5	2019	Arkansas-Pine Bluff

=== Field goal percentage ===
Career
Rank	Player	FG%	Years
1	Jonathan Song	90.9%	2015 2017 2018 2019
2	Chris Manfredini	87.0%	2005 2006 2007
3	Ross Evans	82.4%	2008 2009 2010 2011
4	Jaden Oberkrom	79.0%	2012 2013 2014 2015
5	Nick Browne	78.3%	2001 2002 2003
6	Griffin Kell	75.9%	2019 2020 2021 2022 2023
7	Michael Reeder	75.0%	1994 1995 1996 1997
8	Lee Newman	74.5%	1986 1987 1988
9	Chris Kaylakie	73.2%	1998 1999 2000
10	Kyle Lemmermann	72.0%	2024 2025

Single season
Rank	Player	FG%	Year
1	Chris Manfredini	100.0%	2005
2	Jonathan Song	95.8%	2019
3	Michael Reeder	92.0%	1995
4	Griffin Kell	89.5%	2022
5	Chris Kaylakie	88.9%	2000
6	Chris Manfredini	85.7%	2006
7	Nick Browne	84.8%	2003
8	Ross Evans	84.6%	2011
9	Lee Newman	84.2%	1986
10	Jaden Oberkrom	84.0%	2015
