= Josh Hoover (American football) =

American football player (born 2003)

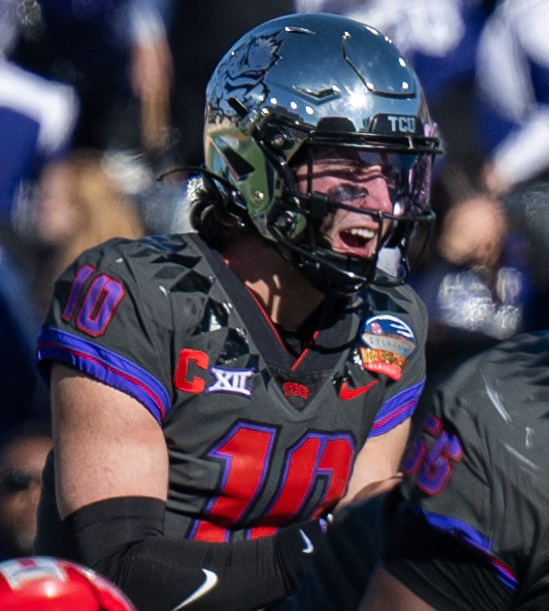
- Hoover with TCU in 2024

No. 10 – Indiana Hoosiers
- Position: Quarterback
- Class: (redshirt) Senior

Personal information
- Born: June 25, 2003 (age 23)
- Listed height: 6 ft 2 in (1.88 m)
- Listed weight: 200 lb (91 kg)

Career information
- High school: Rockwall-Heath (Heath, Texas)
- College: TCU (2022–2025); Indiana (2026–present)

Awards and highlights
- Landry Award (2021)
- Stats at ESPN

Josh Hoover (born June 25, 2003) is an American college football quarterback for the Indiana Hoosiers. He previously played for the TCU Horned Frogs.

== Early life ==
Hoover attended Rockwall-Heath High School and threw for 9,953 yards and 108 touchdowns in three seasons. He was named the 2021 winner of the Landry Award, given annually to the top high school football player in the Dallas-Fort Worth Metroplex. Hoover was rated a 3-star recruit by 247sports and initially committed to play college football for the Indiana Hoosiers. However, he flipped his commitment to play for the TCU Horned Frogs.

== College career ==
=== TCU ===
Hoover began the 2022 season as the fourth-string quarterback at TCU, behind Chandler Morris, Max Duggan, and Sam Jackson V. After Morris was injured in Week 1, Hoover moved up to third string. In a blowout win the following week against Tarleton State, he replaced Jackson late in the fourth quarter and made his collegiate debut, completing his only pass attempt for two yards. This was his only appearance that season, and he took a redshirt.

In 2023, Hoover served as the primary backup to Morris. He threw his first collegiate touchdown in the season opener win against Nicholls State. In Week 6, after Morris was injured against Iowa State, Hoover replaced him and started the final six games of the season. In his first career start against the BYU, he completed 37 of 58 passes for 439 yards and four touchdowns in a 44–11 victory, earning Big 12 Offensive Player of the Week honors.

With Morris transferring to North Texas for the 2024 season, Hoover became TCU’s full-time starting quarterback. He finished 7th in college football with 3,949 passing yards, breaking TCU’s single-season passing record previously held by Trevone Boykin. In a standout comeback against Texas Tech, he completed 21 of 32 passes for 344 yards and three touchdowns, leading the Frogs to a 35–34 victory after trailing by 17 points. He led the Horned Frogs to an 8–4 regular season record. In the 2024 New Mexico Bowl against Louisiana, he completed 20 of 32 passes for 252 yards and four touchdowns with one interception in a 34–3 victory and was named Offensive Player of the Game.

In the 2025 season opener against North Carolina, in what was Bill Belichick's debut as head coach at the University of North Carolina at Chapel Hill, Hoover led TCU to a commanding 48–14 victory. In Week 3, he set a career high with five touchdown passes for 379 yards in a win over SMU. Two weeks later, he threw four touchdowns against Colorado and was named Big 12 Offensive Player of the Week. On the season, Hoover threw 29 touchdowns and 13 interceptions for 3,472 yards, completing 272 of 413 passes, guiding the Horned Frogs to an 8–4 record.

Hoover entered the NCAA transfer portal on December 18, 2025, and did not participate in TCU’s 2025 Alamo Bowl. By the end of his TCU career, Hoover ranked third in school history in passing yards, tied for third in passing touchdowns, fourth in total offense yards, and fourth in total touchdowns responsible for, while also serving as a two-time team captain and starting 31 consecutive games.

=== Indiana ===
On January 4, 2026, Hoover transferred to Indiana, the school from which he had decommitted to play instead for TCU. Entering his senior season, he leads all active FBS players in career passing yards (9,629) and ranks second in career passing touchdowns (71), behind only Noah Fifita. In week two against the Howard Bison, Hoover eclipsed 10,000 career passing yards on a touchdown pass to Charlie Becker. In Week 5 against Rutgers, Hoover threw for 251 yards and 4 touchdowns. In week 8 against the Michigan Wolverines, Hoover threw his first interception of the season to Zeke Berry.

=== Statistics ===
Year	Team	Games			Passing								Rushing			
Year	Team	GP	GS	Record	Cmp	Att	Pct	Yds	Y/A	TD	Int	Rtg	Att	Yds	Avg	TD
2022	TCU	1	0	—	1	1	100.0	2	2.0	0	0	116.8	0	0	0.0	0
2023	TCU	10	6	2–4	185	298	62.1	2,206	7.4	15	9	134.8	20	5	0.3	2
2024	TCU	13	13	9–4	313	471	66.5	3,949	8.4	27	11	151.1	47	-19	-0.4	4
2025	TCU	12	12	8–4	272	413	65.9	3,472	8.4	29	13	153.4	55	4	0.1	2
2026	Indiana	9	9	8–1	124	206	60.2	1,860	9.0	19	2	164.2	33	54	1.6	2
Career		45	40	27–13	895	1,389	64.4	11,489	8.3	90	35	150.3	155	44	0.3	10

== Personal life ==
Hoover is a Christian. He has said, "My faith keeps me grounded and gives me comfort that no matter how I perform on Saturdays, God still loves and cares about me." Hoover's father is Alex Hoover, a former linebacker for Colorado State. Hoover's brother is Caleb Hoover plays baseball and is a first baseman for the Nebraska Cornhuskers and previously at South Carolina.
