= Konrad Wasiela =

Canadian football player (born 1985)

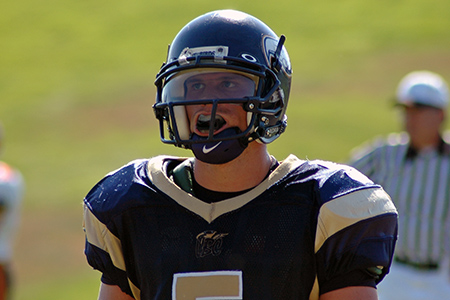
- Konrad Wasiela playing for the UBC Thunderbirds in a 2006 game.

Profile
- Position: Cornerback

Personal information
- Born: June 14, 1985 (age 41); Vancouver, British Columbia
- Listed height: 5 ft 9 in (1.75 m)
- Listed weight: 180 lb (82 kg)

Career information
- University: UBC Thunderbirds
- NFL draft: 2007: undrafted

Career history
- BC Lions (2007); Saskatchewan Roughriders (2008–2009); Montreal Alouettes (2009)
- Stats at CFL.ca (archive)

Konrad Wasiela (born June 14, 1985) is a Canadian former professional football cornerback. He was signed by the BC Lions as an undrafted free agent in 2007. He played CIS football for the UBC Thunderbirds.

Wasiela also played for the Saskatchewan Roughriders and Montreal Alouettes.
