= Cameron Wake =

American gridiron football player (born 1982)

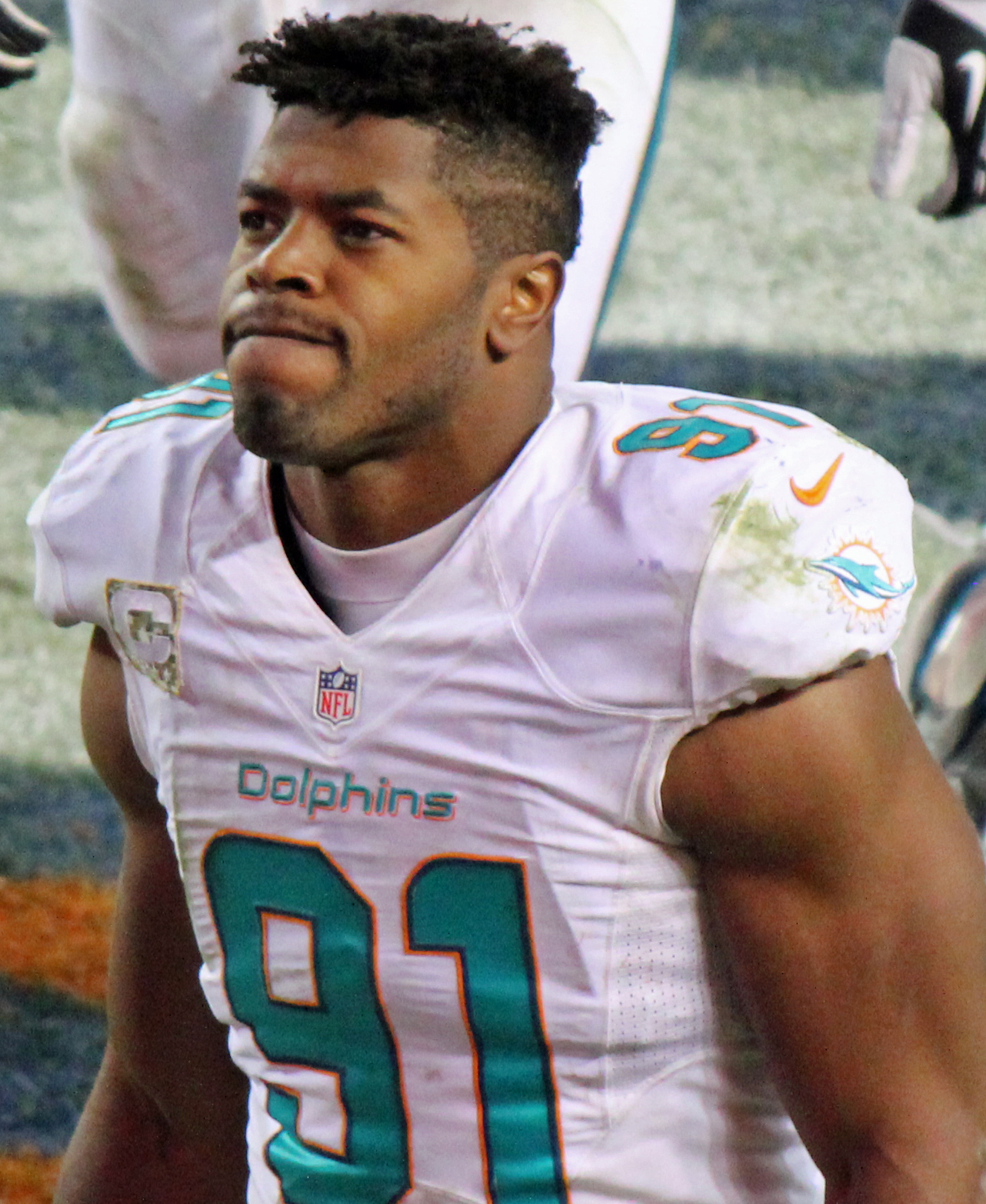
- Wake with the Miami Dolphins in 2014

No. 91
- Positions: Defensive end, linebacker

Personal information
- Born: January 30, 1982 (age 44); Beltsville, Maryland, U.S.
- Listed height: 6 ft 3 in (1.91 m)
- Listed weight: 263 lb (119 kg)

Career information
- High school: DeMatha Catholic (Hyattsville, Maryland)
- College: Penn State (2000–2004)
- NFL draft: 2005: undrafted

Career history
- New York Giants (2005)*; BC Lions (2007–2008); Miami Dolphins (2009–2018); Tennessee Titans (2019)
- * Offseason or practice squad member only

Awards and highlights
- NFL: First-team All-Pro (2012); 3× Second-team All-Pro (2010, 2014, 2016); 5× Pro Bowl (2010, 2012–2014, 2016); CFL: 2× CFL All-Star (2007, 2008); 2× CFL West Division All-Star (2007, 2008); 2× CFL Most Outstanding Defensive Player (2007, 2008); 2× Norm Fieldgate Trophy (2007, 2008); Jackie Parker Trophy (2007); CFL Most Outstanding Rookie (2007); CFL All-Decade Team (2000s)

Career NFL statistics
- Total tackles: 364
- Sacks: 100.5
- Forced fumbles: 22
- Fumble recoveries: 2
- Interceptions: 1
- Stats at Pro Football Reference

Career CFL statistics
- Total tackles: 137
- Sacks: 39
- Forced fumbles: 8
- Fumble recoveries: 3
- Defensive touchdowns: 1
- Stats at CFL.ca (archived)

Derek Cameron Wake (born January 30, 1982) is an American former professional football player who was a defensive end and linebacker in the National Football League (NFL) and Canadian Football League (CFL). He played college football for Penn State Nittany Lions, and was signed by the New York Giants as an undrafted free agent in 2005.

Wake has also played for the CFL's BC Lions, earning the league's Most Outstanding Rookie Award in 2007. He recorded 39 sacks over his first two seasons in the CFL, earning Western Division All-Star honors as well as the Most Outstanding Defensive Player Award both years.

In 2009, Wake signed with the Miami Dolphins and remained with the team until 2019, when he signed with the Tennessee Titans. Throughout his career, Wake has established himself as one of the premier edge rushers in the NFL. He has been selected to five Pro Bowls (four at defensive end, one at outside linebacker), and is a four-time first or second-team All-Pro. His 98 sacks with the Dolphins rank him second all-time in club history to Pro Football Hall of Famer Jason Taylor's 131 sacks, and his 100.5 career sacks also rank second all-time as an undrafted free agent behind John Randle's 137.5.

== Early life ==
Born in Beltsville, Maryland, Wake grew up in the suburban Washington, D.C. area and attended DeMatha High School in Hyattsville, Maryland. He played high school football for the Stags during his time there. During his senior season of 1999, Wake was named The Washington Post Defensive Player of the Year.

== College career ==
Following high school, Wake received an athletic scholarship to attend Pennsylvania State University, where he played for the Penn State Nittany Lions football team. He played mainly as a linebacker for the Nittany Lions, but also played defensive end. Wake finished his collegiate career with 191 total tackles, 8.5 quarterback sacks, and 24 tackles for a loss.

== Professional career ==
=== Pre-draft ===
Pre-draft measurables
Height	Weight	Arm length	Hand span	40-yard dash	10-yard split	20-yard split	20-yard shuttle	Three-cone drill	Vertical jump	Broad jump	Bench press
6 ft 2 3/4 in (1.90 m)	236 lb (107 kg)	34 in (0.86 m)	10 in (0.25 m)	4.67 s	1.68 s	2.74 s	4.11 s	7.12 s	45.5 in (1.16 m)	10 ft 10 in (3.30 m)	20 reps
All values from NFL Combine

Prior to the 2005 NFL draft, Wake worked out at Penn State's Pro Day and ran a 4.55-second 40-yard dash.

=== New York Giants ===
Following his college career, Wake joined the New York Giants in April 2005 but was released in June.

=== BC Lions ===
Wake signed a free agent contract with the BC Lions of the Canadian Football League in May 2007. Switching from linebacker to defensive end, a rejuvenated Wake had an immediate impact with the team, and was named the Defensive Player of the Week for the first week of the 2007 CFL season after an impressive debut (7 tackles, 3 quarterback sacks) in a 24–22 Lions' victory over the Toronto Argonauts.

Wake finished the 2007 season with a league-best 16 sacks and had the only blocked field goal in the CFL that season. He racked up 72 tackles on his way to becoming the first player in CFL history to be named Rookie of the Year and Defensive Player of the Year in the same season.

In 2008, Wake once again led the CFL in sacks (with 23) on his way to another CFL All-Star team selection, a second consecutive Norm Fieldgate Trophy, and he was a unanimous nomination for the CFL's 2008 Most Outstanding Defensive Player award. In 2008, Wake was also named TSN's Friday Night Gladiator of the Year, the first defensive player to win the award.

He was named to The Washington Examiner's CFL All-Decade Team for 2000–2009.

=== Miami Dolphins ===
"I wanted to eliminate all the fluff. It wasn't about whoever offered the biggest deal. It was about the coaching staffs, the opportunity, the organizations. Miami put themselves above the others in those things."

— Cameron Wake, January 2009

At the end of the 2008 CFL season, Wake drew interest from several NFL teams, including the Miami Dolphins, St. Louis Rams, New Orleans Saints, Buffalo Bills and Minnesota Vikings. He worked out for the Dolphins on January 15, 2009.

After receiving interest from 17 total NFL teams and working out for eight, Wake signed with the Dolphins on January 18, 2009. The four-year deal included a $1 million signing bonus and had a potential value of $4.9 million. Wake started the first game of his NFL career during the 2009 season against the Bills in Week 4 and responded with two sacks, four tackles for a loss, and a forced fumble.

During the 2010 season, Wake had a memorable Week 6 against the Green Bay Packers. He had three sacks, including one on third down in overtime, bringing his total to six sacks in five games, already surpassing his total the previous year of 5½ sacks with limited playing time. He ended a game against the Jets with a sack on quarterback Mark Sanchez completing his second of the game. Wake would lead the NFL in sacks at one point and eventually finish third in the NFL (second in the AFC) in sacks. By the end of the season, Wake had recorded 14 sacks, 57 tackles, and three forced fumbles.

Wake was named a starter for the 2011 AFC Pro Bowl team at outside linebacker. Wake was also named to The Sporting News 2010 All-Pro Team and AP's Second All-Pro team. He was 3rd in the league with 52 quarterback pressures, behind only Chris Long and Julius Peppers. He was ranked 63rd by his fellow players on the NFL Top 100 Players of 2011.

On May 5, 2012, Wake signed a four-year contract extension with the Dolphins reported to be worth a total of $49 million, $20 million of which was guaranteed.

After being moved from outside linebacker to defensive end for the 2012 season, Wake had arguably his best season in the NFL. He totaled 53 tackles and 15 sacks, including 4.5 sacks in one game against the Arizona Cardinals. That season, Wake was named a starter for the Pro Bowl for the second time and, together with Randy Starks, became the first of two Dolphins to make the Pro Bowl at two different positions. He was also named a First-team All-Pro by both the AP and the PFWA for the first time in his career.

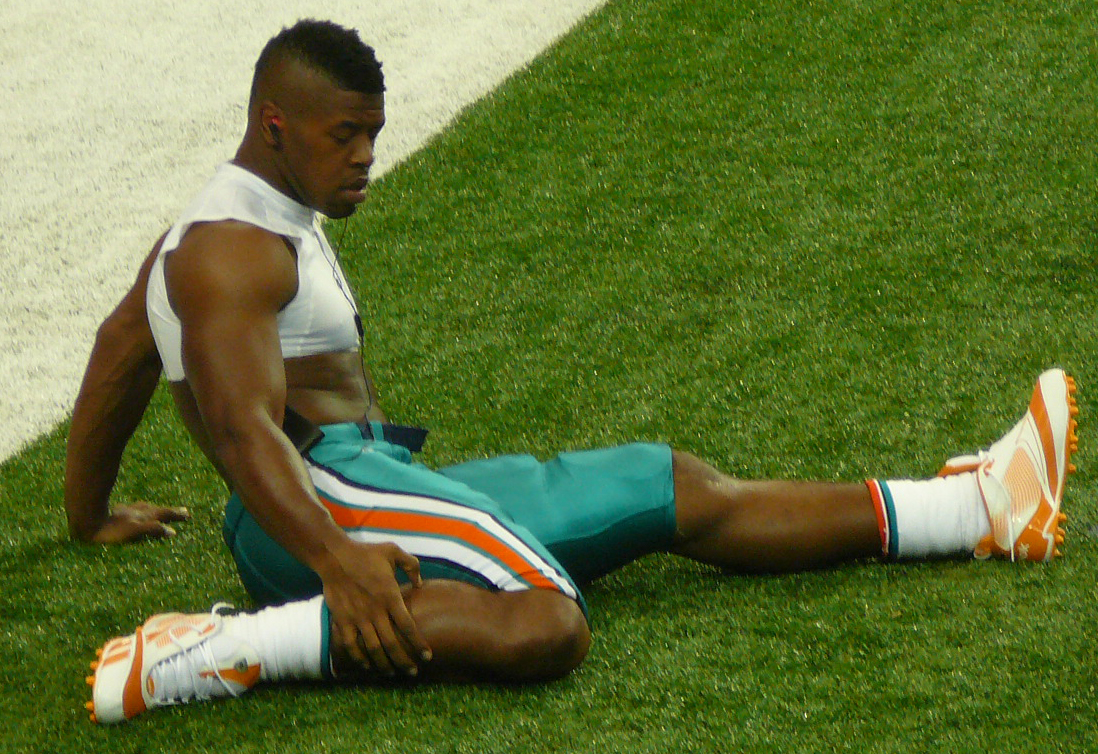
Wake in 2011

Wake earned AFC Defensive Player of the Week honors for his performance against the Cincinnati Bengals in Week 9 of the 2013 season, racking up five tackles, three sacks, two tackles for loss, two quarterback hits and a safety in the Dolphins’ 22–20 overtime victory. Wake sacked Bengals quarterback Andy Dalton in overtime for a safety to end the game, giving the Dolphins a 22–20 victory. It was only the third game in NFL history to end with an overtime safety. He ended the season with 8.5 sacks and another Pro Bowl selection.

After an unproductive start to the 2015 season, in which the Dolphins were 1–3 and Wake had one tackle, head coach Joe Philbin was fired and replaced with tight ends coach Dan Campbell. Wake returned to his dominant form, recording six sacks and four forced fumbles in a two-week span, which were both wins against the Titans and Texans. In a game against the Patriots, Wake notched his seventh sack, which put him in second place on the NFL leaderboard, but he was also injured and carried off the field on a later play. On October 30, 2015, NFL Insider Ian Rapoport reported, due to an Achilles injury, that Wake was out for the rest of the 2015 NFL season.

Wake had a bounce-back season in 2016 after the Achilles injury in 2015. On December 17, 2016, Wake got his first career interception by picking off Jets quarterback Bryce Petty. He finished the season with 11.5 sacks, was named to his fifth Pro Bowl and was second-team All-Pro. He was also ranked 62nd on the NFL Top 100 Players of 2017.

On February 18, 2017, Wake signed a two-year contract extension with the Dolphins through the 2018 season, worth up to $18 million.

In the 2017 season, Wake started all 16 games, recording 36 combined tackles and 10.5 sacks. He was ranked 74th by his peers on the NFL Top 100 Players of 2018.

In the 2018 season, Wake appeared in and started 14 games. He finished with 6.5 sacks, 36 total tackles, one pass defended, and one forced fumble.

=== Tennessee Titans ===
On March 13, 2019, Wake signed a three-year, $23 million contract with the Tennessee Titans.

In the season-opener against the Cleveland Browns, Wake sacked Baker Mayfield 2.5 times, putting him in the 100 sacks club. One of his sacks resulted in a safety and his effort helped lead the Titans to a 43–13 win. He was named AFC Defensive Player of the Week for his performance. On November 26, 2019, Wake was placed on injured reserve. He played in nine games in the 2019 season.

On March 12, 2020, Wake was released by the Titans.

== Career statistics ==
Legend
**Bold**	Career high

=== CFL ===
Year	Team	Games		Tackles		Interceptions						Fumbles			
Year	Team	GP	GS	Cmb	Sck	PD	Int	Yds	Avg	Lng	TD	FF	FR	Yds	TD
2007	BC	18	18	**72**	16.0	0	0	0	0.0	0	0	3	0	0	0
2008	BC	18	18	65	**23.0**	0	0	0	0.0	0	0	**5**	**3**	**45**	**1**
Total		36	36	137	39.0	0	0	0	0.0	0	0	8	3	45	1

=== NFL ===
Year	Team	Games		Tackles				Interceptions						Fumbles		
Year	Team	GP	GS	Cmb	Solo	Ast	Sck	PD	Int	Yds	Avg	Lng	TD	FF	FR	Yds
2009	MIA	14	1	23	19	4	5.5	1	0	0	0.0	0	0	1	0	0
2010	MIA	16	16	**57**	**48**	9	14.0	**4**	0	0	0.0	0	0	3	0	0
2011	MIA	16	14	42	37	5	8.5	3	0	0	0.0	0	0	0	0	0
2012	MIA	16	16	53	38	**15**	**15.0**	1	0	0	0.0	0	0	3	0	0
2013	MIA	15	15	42	37	5	8.5	0	0	0	0.0	0	0	2	**1**	0
2014	MIA	16	16	38	32	6	11.5	3	0	0	0.0	0	0	3	**1**	0
2015	MIA	7	7	9	7	2	7.0	1	0	0	0.0	0	0	4	0	0
2016	MIA	16	11	29	22	7	11.5	2	**1**	**12**	**12.0**	**12**	0	**5**	0	0
2017	MIA	16	16	36	28	10	10.5	0	0	0	0.0	0	0	0	0	0
2018	MIA	14	14	36	21	**15**	6.0	1	0	0	0.0	0	0	1	0	0
2019	TEN	9	0	4	3	1	2.5	1	0	0	0.0	0	0	1	0	0
Total		155	126	364	282	82	100.5	17	1	12	12.0	12	0	22	2	0
