= Devon McDonald =

Jamaican gridiron football player (born 1969)

No. 57, 55, 45
- Position: Linebacker

Personal information
- Born: November 8, 1969 (age 56); Kingston, Jamaica
- Listed height: 6 ft 5 in (1.96 m)
- Listed weight: 240 lb (109 kg)

Career information
- High school: John F. Kennedy (Paterson, New Jersey, U.S.)
- College: Notre Dame
- NFL draft: 1993: 4th round, 107th overall pick

Career history
- Indianapolis Colts (1993–1995); Arizona Cardinals (1996); Tampa Bay Storm (2000–2002)

Career NFL statistics
- Tackles: 50
- Sacks: 1
- Fumble recoveries: 1
- Stats at Pro Football Reference

Career AFL statistics
- Tackles: 6
- Sacks: 2
- Fumble recoveries: 2
- Stats at ArenaFan.com

Devon Linton McDonald (born November 8, 1969) is a former professional American football player who played linebacker for three seasons for the Indianapolis Colts and one season for the Arizona Cardinals. McDonald later played for the Tampa Bay Storm in the Arena Football League (AFL).

== Early life and college ==
McDonald played linebacker at Kennedy High School in Paterson, New Jersey. He then went on to play linebacker for the University of Notre Dame where he was team captain as a senior and an Honorable Mention All-American 1992. He was a member of the 1988 national championship football squad. He was named co-MVP in the 1993 Cotton Bowl.

== Professional football ==
McDonald was the Colts ' fourth round draft pick in the 1993 NFL Draft. He played both outside linebacker and on special teams during his 3 seasons with the Colts. Devon was named the Colts Special Team Player of the Year in 1994. The fans of the Colts named Devon “Unsung Hero of the Year” in 1993. He was then signed by the Cardinals in 1996 and played with them for one season. McDonald then played with the Tampa Bay Storm for 2 seasons from 2000 to 2002.

== Family ==
Devon McDonald has a twin brother Ricardo McDonald who played linebacker for University of Pittsburgh from 1988-1992 and then went on to play professionally for the Cincinnati Bengals, Chicago Bears, and the Denver Broncos. Devon has a nephew (Ricardo McDonald's son) Maurice McDonald who currently plays Linebacker for Tennessee State University. Devon McDonald's younger cousin Lennox Gordon played collegiately for University of New Mexico and went on to play professionally for the Indianapolis Colts and the Buffalo Bills. Devon's oldest nephew Maurice McDonald played wide receiver for University of Maine from 2009-2012. His (Devon McDonald's) niece Brittany McDonald played basketball for Tulane University from 2010-2013. Devon's eldest daughter Jazzmine McDonald who played for Indiana University from 2013-2016.

== Personal life ==
McDonald lives with his wife, Shereasher, and 2 daughters. He is an ordained minister who is active with Sports World Ministries., an organization that speaks to students about life choices.
