= 1992 TCU Horned Frogs football team =

American college football season

1992 TCU Horned Frogs football
- Conference: Southwest Conference
- Record: 2–8–1 (1–6 SWC)
- Head coach: Pat Sullivan (1st season)
- Offensive coordinator: Pete Hoener (1st season)
- Defensive coordinator: Reggie Herring (1st season)
- Home stadium: Amon G. Carter Stadium

1992 Southwest Conference football standings
	Conf.					Overall
Team	W		L		T	W		L		T
No. 7 Texas A&M $	7	–	0	–	0	12	–	1	–	0
Baylor	4	–	3	–	0	7	–	5	–	0
Rice	4	–	3	–	0	6	–	5	–	0
Texas	4	–	3	–	0	6	–	5	–	0
Texas Tech	4	–	3	–	0	5	–	6	–	0
SMU	2	–	5	–	0	5	–	6	–	0
Houston	2	–	5	–	0	4	–	7	–	0
TCU	1	–	6	–	0	2	–	8	–	1
$ – Conference champion; Rankings from AP Poll

The 1992 TCU Horned Frogs football team represented Texas Christian University (TCU) in the 1992 NCAA Division I-A football season. The Horned Frogs finished the season 2–8–1 overall and 1–6 in the Southwest Conference. The team was coached by Pat Sullivan, in his first year as head coach. The Frogs played their home games in Amon G. Carter Stadium, which is located on campus in Fort Worth, Texas.

== Schedule ==
Date	Time	Opponent	Site	TV	Result	Attendance	Source
September 5		at New Mexico*	University Stadium; Albuquerque, NM		L 7–24	24,751	
September 12		Western Michigan*	Amon G. Carter Stadium; Fort Worth, TX		T 17–17	24,889	
September 26	12:00 p.m.	at SMU	Ownby Stadium; University Park, TX (rivalry)	Raycom	L 9–21	18,100	
October 3	7:00 p.m.	Oklahoma State*	Amon G. Carter Stadium; Fort Worth, TX		W 13–11	25,732	
October 10	7:00 p.m.	Baylor	Amon G. Carter Stadium; Fort Worth, TX (rivalry)		L 20–41	25,201	
October 17	4:00 p.m.	at No. 2 Miami (FL)*	Miami Orange Bowl; Miami, FL		L 10–45	42,915	
October 24		Rice	Amon G. Carter Stadium; Fort Worth, TX		L 12–29	21,470	
October 31		at Houston	Houston Astrodome; Houston, TX		L 46–49	15,126	
November 7	12:00 p.m.	No. 20 Texas	Amon G. Carter Stadium; Fort Worth, TX (rivalry)	Raycom	W 23–14	26,112	
November 14	2:00 p.m.	Texas Tech	Amon G. Carter Stadium; Fort Worth, TX (rivalry)		L 28–31	26,386	
November 21	2:30 p.m.	at No. 4 Texas A&M	Kyle Field; College Station, TX (rivalry)	ABC	L 10–37	55,086	
*Non-conference game; Rankings from AP Poll released prior to the game; All times are in Central time; Source:
