= 1992 Texas A&M Aggies football team =

American college football season

1992 Texas A&M Aggies football

SWC champion

Cotton Bowl Classic, L 3–28 vs. Notre Dame
- Conference: Southwest Conference

Ranking
- Coaches: No. 7
- AP: No. 6
- Record: 12–1 (7–0 SWC)
- Head coach: R. C. Slocum (4th season)
- Offensive coordinator: Bob Toledo (4th season)
- Offensive scheme: West Coast
- Defensive coordinator: Bob Davie (4th season)
- Base defense: 3–4
- Home stadium: Kyle Field

1992 Southwest Conference football standings
	Conf.					Overall
Team	W		L		T	W		L		T
No. 7 Texas A&M $	7	–	0	–	0	12	–	1	–	0
Baylor	4	–	3	–	0	7	–	5	–	0
Rice	4	–	3	–	0	6	–	5	–	0
Texas	4	–	3	–	0	6	–	5	–	0
Texas Tech	4	–	3	–	0	5	–	6	–	0
SMU	2	–	5	–	0	5	–	6	–	0
Houston	2	–	5	–	0	4	–	7	–	0
TCU	1	–	6	–	0	2	–	8	–	1
$ – Conference champion; Rankings from AP Poll

The 1992 Texas A&M Aggies football team represented Texas A&M University as a member of the Southwest Conference (SWC) during the 1992 NCAA Division I-A football season. Led by fourth-year head coach R. C. Slocum, the Aggies compiled an overall record of 12–1 with a mark of 7–0 in conference play, winning the SWC title for the second consecutive season. Texas A&M earned a berth in the Cotton Bowl Classic, where the Aggies lost to Notre Dame. The team was ranked No. 6 in the final AP poll and No. 7 in the final Coaches Poll. Texas A&M played home games at Kyle Field in College Station, Texas.

== Schedule ==
Date	Time	Opponent	Rank	Site	TV	Result	Attendance	Source
August 26	8:00 pm	vs. No. 20 Stanford*	No. 7	Anaheim Stadium; Anaheim, CA (Pigskin Classic)	Raycom	W 10–7	35,240	
September 5	2:30 pm	at LSU*	No. 7	Tiger Stadium; Baton Rouge, LA (rivalry)	ABC	W 31–22	69,313	
September 12	6:00 pm	Tulsa*	No. 7	Kyle Field; College Station, TX		W 19–9	58,926	
September 19	1:00 pm	at Missouri*	No. 5	Faurot Field; Columbia, MO		W 26–13	42,031	
October 3	12:00 pm	Texas Tech	No. 5	Kyle Field; College Station, TX (rivalry)	Raycom	W 19–17	69,817	
October 17	2:00 pm	Rice	No. 5	Kyle Field; College Station, TX		W 35–9	53,387	
October 24	2:30 pm	Baylor	No. 5	Kyle Field; College Station, TX (Battle of the Brazos)	ABC	W 19–13	66,542	
October 31	2:00 pm	at SMU	No. 5	Cotton Bowl; Dallas, TX		W 41–7	41,417	
November 7	2:30 pm	Louisville*	No. 5	Kyle Field; College Station, TX	ABC	W 40–18	48,848	
November 12	6:45 pm	at Houston	No. 4	Houston Astrodome; Houston, TX	ESPN	W 38–30	38,644	
November 21	2:30 pm	TCU	No. 4	Kyle Field; College Station, TX (rivalry)	ABC	W 37–10	55,086	
November 26	7:00 pm	at Texas	No. 4	Texas Memorial Stadium; Austin, TX (rivalry)	ESPN	W 34–13	81,170	
January 1	12:00 pm	vs. No. 5 Notre Dame*	No. 4	Cotton Bowl; Dallas, TX (Cotton Bowl Classic)	NBC	L 3–28	71,615	
*Non-conference game; Rankings from AP Poll released prior to the game; All times are in Central time; Source:

== Game summaries ==
=== Stanford ===
	1	2	3	4	Total
#20 Stanford	0	7	0	0	7
#7 Texas A&M	0	0	0	10	10

=== LSU ===
	1	2	3	4	Total
#7 Texas A&M	7	7	3	14	31
LSU	0	7	7	8	22

=== Tulsa ===
	1	2	3	4	Total
Tulsa	0	6	3	0	9
#7 Texas A&M	3	0	7	9	19

=== Missouri ===
	1	2	3	4	Total
#5 Texas A&M	0	3	14	9	26
Missouri	7	3	3	0	13

=== Texas Tech ===
	1	2	3	4	Total
Texas Tech	0	7	7	3	17
#5 Texas A&M	10	0	0	9	19

=== Rice ===
	1	2	3	4	Total
Rice	0	9	0	0	9
#5 Texas A&M	14	0	7	14	35

=== Baylor ===
	1	2	3	4	Total
Baylor	0	10	3	0	13
#5 Texas A&M	7	0	7	5	19

=== SMU ===
	1	2	3	4	Total
#5 Texas A&M	7	14	20	0	41
SMU	7	0	0	0	7

=== Louisville ===
	1	2	3	4	Total
Louisville	6	6	0	6	18
#5 Texas A&M	7	14	12	7	40

=== Houston ===
	1	2	3	4	Total
#4 Texas A&M	0	10	21	7	38
Houston	7	10	0	13	30

=== TCU ===
	1	2	3	4	Total
TCU	0	7	0	3	10
#4 Texas A&M	3	10	3	21	37

=== Texas ===
	1	2	3	4	Total
#4 Texas A&M	0	17	10	7	34
Texas	3	0	10	0	13

=== Notre Dame ===
	1	2	3	4	Total
#5 Notre Dame	0	7	14	7	28
#4 Texas A&M	0	0	0	3	3

== Roster ==
1992 Texas A&M Aggies football team roster
Players
Coaches
Offense

Pos.	#	Name	Class
TE	85	Hayward Clay
RB	27	Greg Hill
OT	72	Jeff Jones
OT	67	Jason Mathews
RB	34	Leeland McElroy
TE	88	James McKeehan
RB	44	Detron Smith
RB	20	Rodney Thomas

Defense

Pos.	#	Name	Class
DT	95	Sam Adams
DE	56	Antonio Armstrong
FS	29	Patrick Bates
LB	46	Reggie Brown
LB	9	Marcus Buckley
DE	92	Eric England
CB	31	Aaron Glenn
DB	23	Derrick Frazier
DB	24	Ray Mickens

Special teams

Pos.	#	Name	Class

Head coach

- R. C. Slocum

Coordinators/assistant coaches

Legend

- (C) Team captain
- (S) Suspended
- (I) Ineligible
- Injured
- Redshirt
