= 1992 John Hancock Bowl =

American college football game

- 59th Sun Bowl
Arizona Wildcats	Baylor Bears
(6–4–1)	(6–5)
Pac-10	SWC
15	20
Head coach: Dick Tomey	Head coach: Grant Teaff
AP / Coaches / BC; 22 / 22 / 22
	1	2	3	4	Total
Arizona	3	10	0	2	15
Baylor	0	7	7	6	20
- Date: December 31, 1992
- Season: 1992
- Stadium: Sun Bowl
- Location: El Paso, Texas
- MVP: Melvin Bonner (WR, Baylor)
- Referee: Buddy Ward (Big East)
- Attendance: 41,622
- Payout: US$1.1M

United States TV coverage
- Network: CBS
- Announcers: Verne Lundquist and Dan Fouts

The 1992 John Hancock Bowl was a college football bowl game played on December 31, 1992, at the Sun Bowl in El Paso, Texas. The game pitted the Baylor Bears against the Arizona Wildcats. It was the final contest of the 1992 NCAA Division I-A football season for both teams, and ended in a 20–15 victory for Baylor. It was also the final game for Grant Teaff, the long-time Baylor coach, who previously announced his retirement.

== Statistics ==
Statistics	Baylor	Arizona
First downs	12	23
Rushing yards	47	136
Passing yards	202	282
Return yards	1	36
Passes (C–A–I)	8–24–0	20–38–0
Total offense	249	418
Punts–average	6–39.7	5–33.8
Fumbles–lost	4–0	2–2
Penalties–yards	8–30	8–91
Possession Time	27:38	32:22
