= 1993 Cotton Bowl Classic =

1993 Mobil Cotton Bowl Classic
- 57th Cotton Bowl Classic
Notre Dame Fighting Irish	Texas A&M Aggies
(9–1–1)	(12–0)
Independent	SWC
28	3
Head coach: Lou Holtz	Head coach: R. C. Slocum
AP / Coaches / BC; 5 / 5 / 5	AP / Coaches / BC; 4 / 3 / 4
	1	2	3	4	Total
Notre Dame	0	7	14	7	28
Texas A&M	0	0	0	3	3
- Date: January 1, 1993
- Season: 1992
- Stadium: Cotton Bowl
- Location: Dallas, Texas
- MVP: DE Devon McDonald (Notre Dame); QB Rick Mirer (Notre Dame)
- Referee: John Laurie (Big Eight)
- Attendance: 71,615

United States TV coverage
- Network: NBC
- Announcers: Tom Hammond, Paul Maguire and Hannah Storm

The Cotton Bowl in Dallas, Texas, hosted the Cotton Bowl Classic.

The 1993 Mobil Cotton Bowl Classic was a college football bowl game played on January 1, 1993, at the Cotton Bowl in Dallas, Texas. The bowl game featured the Notre Dame Fighting Irish versus the Southwest Conference champions, Texas A&M. Notre Dame upset the previously undefeated Aggies in a 28–3 victory.

== Matchup ==
=== Texas A&M ===
Texas A&M was ranked fourth in the AP Poll entering the game. The Aggies won the Southwest Conference and came into the game with a 12–0 record. The team was led on offense by running back Greg Hill, who rushed for more than 1,300 yards on the season, but he was one of five players suspended for the bowl game after an investigation found that they accepted payment from a team booster. Defensive back Aaron Glenn led the Aggie defense with six interceptions that year.

=== Notre Dame ===
Notre Dame (9–1–1) was ranked fifth and featured quarterback Rick Mirer and running backs Reggie Brooks and Jerome Bettis. Brooks finished fifth in the voting for the Heisman Trophy that season. Bettis rushed for 825 yards on the season. In both 1991 and 1992, Bettis finished third in the NCAA in rushing touchdowns.

The selection of Texas A&M's opponent generated controversy weeks before the game was played. Notre Dame was chosen by the Cotton Bowl's board of directors, who faced criticism for not selecting the third-ranked Florida State Seminoles. Barry Horn and Darryl Richards of the Dallas Morning News wrote that "the Cotton Bowl not only ignored the wishes of its host school and what many believe is the intent of the first-year Bowl Coalition, but the desire of its new network partner as well."

NBC Sports televised both the Cotton Bowl and the Orange Bowl that season. The network preferred to have Notre Dame play in its primetime broadcast of the Orange Bowl rather than the Cotton Bowl. Texas A&M would have preferred to face the higher-ranked Seminoles. Board members for the Cotton Bowl said that they considered several factors, including the potential for ticket sales and the wishes of the network. Board members pointed out the Texas A&M-Florida State matchup at the 1992 Cotton Bowl Classic, saying that they preferred to avoid a rematch in consecutive years. Notre Dame honored the invitation of the Cotton Bowl board while Florida State played Nebraska in the Orange Bowl.

== Game summary ==
During the first possession of the game, Texas A&M recovered a fumble that occurred on a pitch from Mirer to Brooks but did not score. Notre Dame threw 15 passes in the first half and scored just before halftime to make the score 7–0. The Fighting Irish threw only three passes in the second half and its rushing game took control. Notre Dame had a run of 34 consecutive running plays at one point in the second half. The team netted 290 rushing yards, including 115 yards from Brooks, 75 yards from Bettis and 55 rushing yards from Mirer. Mirer finished with 119 passing yards. Bettis scored three of the team's four touchdowns.

In the second half, Texas A&M recovered a fumble by Brooks at their own 4-yard line. Two plays later, Texas A&M quarterback Corey Pullig fumbled the ball and Notre Dame recovered. The Aggies scored their only points on a 41-yard field goal in the fourth quarter. The Fighting Irish won the game by a score of 28–3.

Artificial turf was removed from the playing surface after the game and natural grass was planted in anticipation of the stadium hosting the 1994 FIFA World Cup. Ironically, Notre Dame also won the first Cotton Bowl Classic played on artificial turf, defeating Texas 24-11 on New Year's Day 1971, ending the Longhorns' 30-game winning streak.
