= Josh Boden =

Canadian football wide receiver in the Canadian Football League (b.1986)

Joshua Joseph Boden
No. 1
- Position: Wide receiver

Personal information
- Born: December 12, 1986 (age 39); Vancouver, British Columbia, Canada
- Listed height: 6 ft 1 in (1.85 m)
- Listed weight: 212 lb (96 kg)

Career history
- 2006–2007: BC Lions
- 2008: Hamilton Tiger-Cats
- Stats at CFL.ca (archive)

Joshua (Josh) Joseph Boden (born December 12, 1986) is a Canadian former professional football wide receiver in the Canadian Football League (CFL). His career came to an end as the result of several years of criminal activity, including sexual assault, many under the alias Mike Boden. Boden was charged in 2018 with second-degree murder for the 2009 killing of Kimberly Hallgarth. He was convicted and sentenced to life in prison, and he will not be eligible for parole for at least 14 years.

== Football career ==
Boden wore the number 1, weighs 205 pounds (93 kg) and is 6 feet 1 inch (1.85 m) tall. In his Canadian Junior Football League career, Boden played for the South Surrey Rams (now the Langley Rams of the British Columbia Football Conference). In his only season there, Boden was BCFC Most Outstanding Receiver, Special Teams Player, Offensive Player and Rookie of the Year. He won the CJFL Rookie of the Year award as well.

=== BC Lions ===
In 2005, Boden attended the BC Lions training camp. In a preseason game against the Calgary Stampeders, he scored a 14-yard touchdown. Boden was officially signed as a free agent by B.C. in May 2006, but as a member of the Territorial Protected List. In 2006, he attended training camp again and made the teams as a member of the Developmental Roster. In 2007, Boden made the team's roster as a backup wide receiver. During a game on September 29, 2007, he caught his first CFL pass and finished the game with 3 catches for 83 yards.

Boden was released by the Lions following being charged with domestic assault and robbery in April 2008. The charges were dropped on August 14, 2008, and Boden stated his intention to resume his football career. BC Lions general manager Wally Buono stated he did not intend to re-sign him. In two seasons with the Lions he caught 14 passes for 237 yards.

=== Hamilton Tiger-Cats ===
Three months after being released by the Lions he formally signed with the Hamilton Tiger-Cats on September 24, 2008, in time for a September 27 game against the Lions at BC Place. Nevertheless, he never played a regular season game for the Ti-Cats. After he was cut, GM Bob O'Billovich said Boden was cut because Chris Bauman's post-concussion problems were cleared.

== Criminal history ==
Joshua Boden goes by the alias Mike Boden and has an extensive criminal history of violence, sexual assault, and involvement with sex workers.

=== 2008 ===
Joshua Boden was charged with assault, theft, and mischief (court file number 197454) in April 2008 in connection with a complaint laid by former girlfriend Kimberly Lynn Hallgarth, age 33. Hallgarth changed her story on the witness stand in August 2008 and charges were dropped. The charges resulted in Boden's dismissal from the BC Lions. On October 12, 2008, Boden was charged with four firearms offences.

=== 2009 ===
On or about March 15, 2009, Kim Hallgarth was found brutally murdered at her 6776 Colborne Avenue, Burnaby, British Columbia residence (IHIT File #2009-2220). Boden was a "person of interest" in the Hallgarth investigation. Karen Boden, Josh's mother, said that her son always blamed Hallgarth for "ruining" his football career. It was reported that Kimberly Hallgarth owned a nail salon but also worked as a sex worker. It has been noted that Boden's mother, Karen, was placed in a safe house to hide from her son and also altered her appearance to not be recognized by the son she now fears.

On Monday September 7, 2009, Boden was arrested by Vancouver Police after the police allegedly observed him fondling a woman. Boden was taken into custody after a violent struggle near Commercial Drive and Broadway in Vancouver and charged with sexual assault and resisting or obstructing the police. Boden was also a person of interest in four other sexual assaults by a muscular black male during the summer of 2009. Previous firearms charges were dismissed Thursday October 11, 2009 due to prosecution not proving the four firearms in Boden's possession were operational.

=== 2011 ===
On December 12 or 13, 2011, Boden was convicted of two counts of sexual assault and one count of assaulting and one count of obstructing a police officer.

=== 2012 ===
Joshua Boden was charged under Criminal Code of Canada 264.1. Uttering threats according to B.C. Court file number 192462 January 14, 2012. These charges were thrown out of court. On April 13, 2012, while on bail for previous charges, Joshua Boden was charged with four counts of assault at Tinseltown Cinema in Vancouver according to B.C. Court file number 11232. On July 26, 2012, Crown lawyer Michaela Donnelly asked for a one-year jail sentence for the former BC Lions football player convicted of sex crimes at Vancouver SkyTrain stations. Boden was set to appear in Vancouver Provincial Court on August 31, 2012 for decision. On August 31, 2012, Josh Boden was sentenced to one year of imprisonment for the 2009 sex-crimes he committed as well as obstruction and assaulting a police officer. He served six months, given credit for time already in custody, and was to be on probation for three years after his release.

=== 2014 ===
Boden was charged with four counts of assault causing bodily harm and breaching his probation conditions. This was relating to a complaint to Surrey RCMP received from a woman alleging that Josh Boden assaulted her several times dating back to 2013. These charges were thrown out of court. On July 15, 2014, Joshua Joseph Boden was facing multiple charges: Procuring someone to be a sex worker, living on the avails of sex work, aiding a person to engage in sex work and criminal harassment. These charges were related to incidents that took place in Vancouver and Port Moody in February 2014. These charges were thrown out of court.

=== 2018 ===
On November 5, 2018, Boden was charged with second-degree murder after the 2009 killing of Kimberly Hallgarth, his ex-girlfriend.

=== 2022-2022 ===
In 2021, Boden was convicted of Hallgarth murder. The British Columbia Supreme Court Justice subsequently sentenced Boden to life in prison, with no chance of parole for fourteen years.
