= 1992 Rice Owls football team =

American college football season

1992 Rice Owls football
- Conference: Southwest Conference
- Record: 6–5 (4–3 SWC)
- Head coach: Fred Goldsmith (4th season)
- Offensive coordinator: Mike Heimerdinger (4th season)
- Defensive coordinator: Craig Bohl (4th season)
- Home stadium: Rice Stadium

1992 Southwest Conference football standings
	Conf.					Overall
Team	W		L		T	W		L		T
No. 7 Texas A&M $	7	–	0	–	0	12	–	1	–	0
Baylor	4	–	3	–	0	7	–	5	–	0
Rice	4	–	3	–	0	6	–	5	–	0
Texas	4	–	3	–	0	6	–	5	–	0
Texas Tech	4	–	3	–	0	5	–	6	–	0
SMU	2	–	5	–	0	5	–	6	–	0
Houston	2	–	5	–	0	4	–	7	–	0
TCU	1	–	6	–	0	2	–	8	–	1
$ – Conference champion; Rankings from AP Poll

The 1992 Rice Owls football team was an American football team that represented Rice University in the Southwest Conference during the 1992 NCAA Division I-A football season. In their fourth year under head coach Fred Goldsmith, the team compiled a 6–5 record.

== Schedule ==
Date	Opponent	Site	Result	Attendance	Source
September 5	at Air Force*	Falcon Stadium; Colorado Springs, CO	L 21–30	43,121	
September 19	at Duke*	Wallace Wade Stadium; Durham, NC	L 12–17	11,400	
September 26	Sam Houston State*	Rice Stadium; Houston, TX	W 45–14	21,500	
October 3	Texas	Rice Stadium; Houston, TX (rivalry)	L 21–23	41,100	
October 10	SMU	Rice Stadium; Houston, TX (rivalry)	W 28–13	15,100	
October 17	at No. 5 Texas A&M	Kyle Field; College Station, TX	L 9–35	53,387	
October 24	at TCU	Amon G. Carter Stadium; Fort Worth, TX	W 29–12	21,470	
November 7	Texas Tech	Rice Stadium; Houston, TX	W 34–3	19,800	
November 14	Baylor	Rice Stadium; Houston, TX	W 34–31	21,700	
November 21	Navy*	Rice Stadium; Houston, TX	W 27–22	23,600	
November 28	at Houston	Houston Astrodome; Houston, TX (rivalry)	L 34–61	15,006	
*Non-conference game; Rankings from AP Poll released prior to the game

== Roster ==
1992 Rice Owls football team roster
Players
Coaches
Offense

Pos.	#	Name	Class
WR	23	Donald Allen	Sr
WR	2	Emerson Allen	Fr
OT	69	Mike Appelbaum	Sr
WR	20	Louis Balady	Sr
RB	45	Trevor Cobb	Sr
OT	67	Chris Cooley	Fr
RB	34	Byron Coston	So
TE	87	Kolis Crier	Jr
WR	83	Herschel Crowe	Jr
RB	27	Yoncy Edmonds	Fr
QB	12	Bert Emanuel	Jr
RB	31	Jeff Epp	So
G	76	Brandon Fitzgerald	So
RB	24	Spencer George	Fr
OT	74	Jimmy Golden	Jr
C	52	Bill Goins	So
TE	83	Bob Gray	So
G	64	Charles Gulbronson	Jr
OL		Chas Gulbronson
WR	5	Chris Hall	Fr
C	72	Tom Hetherington	Jr
WR	29	Ed Howard	Fr
QB	7	Josh LaRocca	So
WR	14	Jimmy Lee	So
TE	84	Clemente Torres	So
QB	6	Greg Willig	Sr

Defense

Pos.	#	Name	Class
DL	89	Shawn Alberding	Sr
DB	33	Nathan Bennett	Jr
LB	56	Joe Davis	Fr
DB	36	Bobby Dixon	Fr
DT	68	Mike Ecklund	So
DB	28	Dana Hogan	So
DL	88	Shane Hollas	Sr
LB	26	Larry Izzo	Fr
CB	21	Clifford Jackson	Sr
LB	40	Larry Jeter	Jr
DB	47	Jay Lamy	Fr
DB	42	Kerry Lewis	So
DL	44	Deric Rutherford	So
DL	93	Corey Seymour	Jr
DL	96	Matt Sign	Sr
DL	94	Michael Shirk	So
DB	19	Jeff Sowells	Fr
LB	50	Emmett Waldron	So
DB	9	Sean Washington	Jr
LB	48	Joey Wheeler	Sr
LB	46	Alonzo Williams	Sr

Special teams

Pos.	#	Name	Class
P	37	Tucker Phillips	Fr
K	10	Darrell Richardson	So

Head coach

- Fred Goldsmith

Coordinators/assistant coaches

Legend

- (C) Team captain
- (S) Suspended
- (I) Ineligible
- Injured
- Redshirt
