= 1992 Houston Cougars football team =

American college football season

1992 Houston Cougars football
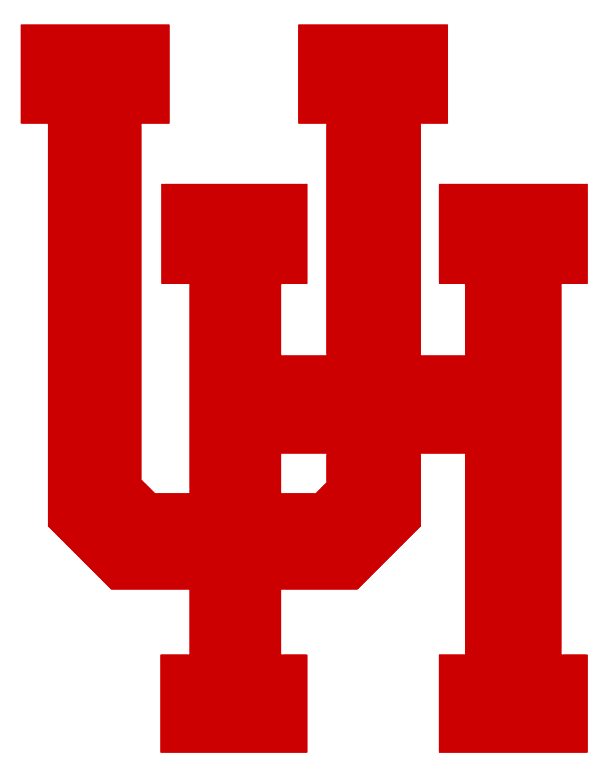
- Conference: Southwest Conference
- Record: 4–7 (2–5 SWC)
- Head coach: John Jenkins (3rd season)
- Offensive scheme: Run and shoot
- Defensive coordinator: Ben Hurt (2nd season)
- Base defense: 4–3
- Captains: Eric Blount; Freddie Gilbert; Chris Pezman; Jason Youngblood
- Home stadium: Houston Astrodome

1992 Southwest Conference football standings
	Conf.					Overall
Team	W		L		T	W		L		T
No. 7 Texas A&M $	7	–	0	–	0	12	–	1	–	0
Baylor	4	–	3	–	0	7	–	5	–	0
Rice	4	–	3	–	0	6	–	5	–	0
Texas	4	–	3	–	0	6	–	5	–	0
Texas Tech	4	–	3	–	0	5	–	6	–	0
SMU	2	–	5	–	0	5	–	6	–	0
Houston	2	–	5	–	0	4	–	7	–	0
TCU	1	–	6	–	0	2	–	8	–	1
$ – Conference champion; Rankings from AP Poll

The 1992 Houston Cougars football team represented the University of Houston as a member of the Southwest Conference (SWC) during the 1992 NCAA Division I-A football season. Led by John Jenkins in his third and final season as head coach, the Cougars compiled an overall record of 4–7 and a mark of 2–5 in conference play, tying for sixth place in the SWC. The team played home games at the Houston Astrodome in Houston.

== Schedule ==
Date	Opponent	Site	TV	Result	Attendance	Source
September 5	at Tulsa*	Skelly Stadium; Tulsa, OK		L 25–28	33,619	
September 19	Illinois*	Houston Astrodome; Houston, TX	ABC	W 31–13	25,931	
September 26	at No. 4 Michigan*	Michigan Stadium; Ann Arbor, MI	ABC	L 7–61	104,968	
October 3	Southwestern Louisiana*	Rice Stadium; Houston, TX		W 63–7	17,123	
October 17	at Baylor	Floyd Casey Stadium; Waco, TX (rivalry)	Raycom	L 23–29	27,890	
October 24	at Texas	Texas Memorial Stadium; Austin, TX	Raycom	L 38–45	66,038	
October 31	TCU^{†}	Houston Astrodome; Houston, TX		W 49–46	15,126	
November 7	at SMU	Ownby Stadium; University Park, TX (rivalry)		L 16–41	14,273	
November 12	No. 4 Texas A&M	Houston Astrodome; Houston, TX	ESPN	L 30–38	38,644	
November 21	at Texas Tech	Jones Stadium; Lubbock, TX (rivalry)		L 35–44	27,887	
November 28	Rice	Houston Astrodome; Houston, TX (rivalry)	Raycom	W 61–34	15,006	
*Non-conference game; ^{†}Homecoming; Rankings from AP Poll released prior to the game

== Roster ==
1992 Houston Cougars football team roster
Players
Coaches
Offense

Pos.	#	Name	Class
QB		Donald Douglas
QB		Jimmy Klingler

Defense

Pos.	#	Name	Class
LB		Ryan McCoy

Special teams

Pos.	#	Name	Class

Head coach

- John Jenkins

Coordinators/assistant coaches

Legend

- (C) Team captain
- (S) Suspended
- (I) Ineligible
- Injured
- Redshirt
