= 1992 Texas Tech Red Raiders football team =

American college football season

1992 Texas Tech Red Raiders football
- Conference: Southwest Conference
- Record: 5–6 (4–3 SWC)
- Head coach: Spike Dykes (6th season)
- Offensive coordinator: Dick Winder (6th season)
- Offensive scheme: No-huddle spread
- Defensive coordinator: Carlos Mainord (6th season)
- Base defense: 3–4
- Home stadium: Jones Stadium

1992 Southwest Conference football standings
| | Conf. | | | | | Overall |
| Team | W | | L | | T | W | | L | | T |
|---|---|---|---|---|---|---|---|---|---|---|
| No. 7 Texas A&M $ | 7 | – | 0 | – | 0 | 12 | – | 1 | – | 0 |
| Baylor | 4 | – | 3 | – | 0 | 7 | – | 5 | – | 0 |
| Rice | 4 | – | 3 | – | 0 | 6 | – | 5 | – | 0 |
| Texas | 4 | – | 3 | – | 0 | 6 | – | 5 | – | 0 |
| Texas Tech | 4 | – | 3 | – | 0 | 5 | – | 6 | – | 0 |
| SMU | 2 | – | 5 | – | 0 | 5 | – | 6 | – | 0 |
| Houston | 2 | – | 5 | – | 0 | 4 | – | 7 | – | 0 |
| TCU | 1 | – | 6 | – | 0 | 2 | – | 8 | – | 1 |
$ – Conference champion; Rankings from AP Poll

The 1992 Texas Tech Red Raiders football team represented Texas Tech University as a member of the Southwest Conference (SWC) during the 1992 NCAA Division I-A football season. In their sixth season under head coach Spike Dykes, the Red Raiders compiled a 5–6 record (4–3 against SWC opponents), finished in a tie for second place in the conference, and were outscored by a combined total of 332 to 287. The team played its home games at Clifford B. and Audrey Jones Stadium in Lubbock, Texas.

== Schedule ==
| Date | Time | Opponent | Site | TV | Result | Attendance | Source |
|---|---|---|---|---|---|---|---|
| September 3 | 6:45 pm | No. 15 Oklahoma* | Jones Stadium; Lubbock, TX | ESPN | L 9–34 | 48,691 | |
| September 12 | 7:00 pm | Wyoming* | Jones Stadium; Lubbock, TX | | W 49–32 | 34,940 | |
| September 19 | 2:30 pm | at Oregon* | Autzen Stadium; Eugene, OR | Raycom | L 13–16 | 28,361 | |
| September 26 | 7:00 pm | Baylor^{†} | Jones Stadium; Lubbock, TX (rivalry) | | W 36–17 | 42,094 | |
| October 3 | 12:00 pm | at No. 5 Texas A&M | Kyle Field; College Station, TX (rivalry) | Raycom | L 17–19 | 69,817 | |
| October 10 | 12:00 pm | at No. 25 NC State* | Carter–Finley Stadium; Raleigh, NC | | L 13–48 | 41,800 | |
| October 24 | 2:00 pm | SMU | Jones Stadium; Lubbock, TX | | W 39–25 | 34,056 | |
| October 31 | 12:00 pm | No. 25 Texas | Jones Stadium; Lubbock, TX (rivalry) | Raycom | L 33–44 | 50,741 | |
| November 7 | 2:00 pm | at Rice | Rice Stadium; Houston, TX | | L 3–34 | 19,800 | |
| November 14 | 2:00 pm | at TCU | Amon G. Carter Stadium; Fort Worth, TX (rivalry) | | W 31–28 | 26,386 | |
| November 21 | 2:00 pm | Houston | Jones Stadium; Lubbock, TX (rivalry) | | W 44–35 | 27,887 | |
*Non-conference game; ^{†}Homecoming; Rankings from AP Poll released prior to the game; All times are in Central time; Source:
