= 1992 SMU Mustangs football team =

American college football season

1992 SMU Mustangs football
- Conference: Southwest Conference
- Record: 5–6 (2–5 SWC)
- Head coach: Tom Rossley (2nd season)
- Offensive coordinator: Mike Wade (2nd season)
- Offensive scheme: Run and shoot
- Defensive coordinator: Jon Tenuta (3rd season)
- Base defense: 4–3
- Home stadium: Ownby Stadium; Cotton Bowl

1992 Southwest Conference football standings
	Conf.					Overall
Team	W		L		T	W		L		T
No. 7 Texas A&M $	7	–	0	–	0	12	–	1	–	0
Baylor	4	–	3	–	0	7	–	5	–	0
Rice	4	–	3	–	0	6	–	5	–	0
Texas	4	–	3	–	0	6	–	5	–	0
Texas Tech	4	–	3	–	0	5	–	6	–	0
SMU	2	–	5	–	0	5	–	6	–	0
Houston	2	–	5	–	0	4	–	7	–	0
TCU	1	–	6	–	0	2	–	8	–	1
$ – Conference champion; Rankings from AP Poll

The 1992 SMU Mustangs football team represented Southern Methodist University (SMU) as a member of the Southwest Conference (SWC) during the 1992 NCAA Division I-A football season. Led by second-year head coach Tom Rossley, the Mustangs compiled an overall record of 5–6 with a mark of 2–5 in conference play, tying for sixth place in the SWC.

== Schedule ==
Date	Time	Opponent	Site	TV	Result	Attendance	Source
September 5	7:00 p.m.	Tulane*	Ownby Stadium; University Park, TX		L 12–13	15,100	
September 12	12:00 p.m.	North Texas*	Ownby Stadium; University Park, TX (rivalry)		W 28–14	10,200	
September 19	8:05 p.m.	at New Mexico*	University Stadium; Albuquerque, NM		W 20–13	21,660	
September 26	12:00 p.m.	TCU	Ownby Stadium; University Park, TX (rivalry)	Raycom	W 21–9	18,100	
October 3	1:00 p.m.	at Baylor	Floyd Casey Stadium; Waco, TX		L 7–49	24,926	
October 10	12:00 p.m.	at Rice	Rice Stadium; Houston, TX (rivalry)	Raycom	L 13–28	15,100	
October 24	2:00 p.m.	at Texas Tech	Jones Stadium; Lubbock, TX		L 25–39	34,056	
October 31	2:00 p.m.	No. 5 Texas A&M	Cotton Bowl; Dallas, TX		L 7–41	41,417	
November 7	2:00 p.m.	Houston	Ownby Stadium; University Park, TX (rivalry)		W 41–16	14,273	
November 14	1:00 p.m.	at Texas	Texas Memorial Stadium; Austin, TX		L 14–35	61,248	
November 21	2:00 p.m.	at Arkansas*	War Memorial Stadium; Little Rock, Arkansas, AR		W 24–19	41,080	
*Non-conference game; Rankings from AP Poll released prior to the game; All times are in Central time; Source:

== Roster ==
1992 SMU Mustangs football team roster
Players
Coaches
Offense

Pos.	#	Name	Class
OL	79	Trey Cowan	Sr
QB	8	Ramon Flanigan	Fr
WR	22	Mick Rossley	So
WR	33	Jason Wolf	Sr

Defense

Pos.	#	Name	Class
DB	40	Cary Brabham	Sr
DB	28	Marcello Simmons	Sr
DB	9	Marcus Malonson	Jr

Special teams

Pos.	#	Name	Class

Head coach

- Tom Rossley

Coordinators/assistant coaches

- Joe Loth (GA)

Legend

- (C) Team captain
- (S) Suspended
- (I) Ineligible
- Injured
- Redshirt
