= 1992 Baylor Bears football team =

American college football season

1992 Baylor Bears football

Sun Bowl champion

Sun Bowl, W 20–15 vs. Arizona
- Conference: Southwest Conference
- Record: 7–5 (4–3 SWC)
- Head coach: Grant Teaff (21st season)
- Offensive coordinator: Chuck Reedy (3rd season)
- Offensive scheme: I formation
- Base defense: 4–4
- Home stadium: Floyd Casey Stadium

1992 Southwest Conference football standings
| | Conf. | | | | | Overall |
| Team | W | | L | | T | W | | L | | T |
|---|---|---|---|---|---|---|---|---|---|---|
| No. 7 Texas A&M $ | 7 | – | 0 | – | 0 | 12 | – | 1 | – | 0 |
| Baylor | 4 | – | 3 | – | 0 | 7 | – | 5 | – | 0 |
| Rice | 4 | – | 3 | – | 0 | 6 | – | 5 | – | 0 |
| Texas | 4 | – | 3 | – | 0 | 6 | – | 5 | – | 0 |
| Texas Tech | 4 | – | 3 | – | 0 | 5 | – | 6 | – | 0 |
| SMU | 2 | – | 5 | – | 0 | 5 | – | 6 | – | 0 |
| Houston | 2 | – | 5 | – | 0 | 4 | – | 7 | – | 0 |
| TCU | 1 | – | 6 | – | 0 | 2 | – | 8 | – | 1 |
$ – Conference champion; Rankings from AP Poll

The 1992 Baylor Bears football team represented Baylor University as a member of the Southwest Conference (SWC) during the 1992 NCAA Division I-A football season. Led by Grant Teaff in his 21st and final season as head coach, the Bears compiled an overall record of 7–5 with a mark of 4–3 in conference play, placing in a four-way tie for second in the SWC. Baylor was invited to the Sun Bowl, where the Bears beat Arizona. The team played home games at Floyd Casey Stadium in Waco, Texas.

== Schedule ==
| Date | Time | Opponent | Site | TV | Result | Attendance | Source |
|---|---|---|---|---|---|---|---|
| September 5 | 7:00 p.m. | Louisiana Tech* | Floyd Casey Stadium; Waco, TX | | L 9–10 | 33,434 | |
| September 12 | 12:00 p.m. | No. 12 Colorado* | Floyd Casey Stadium; Waco, TX | Raycom | L 38–57 | 34,202 | |
| September 19 | 1:00 p.m. | Utah State* | Floyd Casey Stadium; Waco, TX | | W 45–10 | 28,737 | |
| September 26 | 7:00 p.m. | at Texas Tech | Jones Stadium; Lubbock, TX (rivalry) | | L 17–36 | 42,094 | |
| October 3 | 1:00 p.m. | SMU | Floyd Casey Stadium; Waco, TX | | W 49–7 | 24,926 | |
| October 10 | 7:00 p.m. | at TCU | Amon G. Carter Stadium; Fort Worth, TX (rivalry) | | W 41–20 | 25,201 | |
| October 17 | 12:00 p.m. | Houston | Floyd Casey Stadium; Waco, TX (rivalry) | Raycom | W 29–23 | 27,890 | |
| October 24 | 2:30 p.m. | at No. 5 Texas A&M | Kyle Field; College Station, TX (Battle of the Brazos) | ABC | L 13–19 | 66,542 | |
| November 7 | 1:00 p.m. | Georgia Tech*^{†} | Floyd Casey Stadium; Waco, TX | | W 31–27 | 38,213 | |
| November 14 | 12:00 p.m. | at Rice | Rice Stadium; Houston, TX | Raycom | L 31–34 | 21,700 | |
| November 21 | 12:00 p.m. | Texas | Floyd Casey Stadium; Waco, TX (rivalry) | Raycom | W 21–20 | 39,110 | |
| December 31 | 1:30 p.m. | vs. Arizona* | Sun Bowl; El Paso, TX (John Hancock Bowl) | CBS | W 20–15 | 41,622 | |
*Non-conference game; ^{†}Homecoming; Rankings from AP Poll released prior to the game; All times are in Central time; Source:
