= 1992 Texas Longhorns football team =

American college football season

1992 Texas Longhorns football
- Conference: Southwest Conference
- Record: 6–5 (4–3 SWC)
- Head coach: John Mackovic (1st season)
- Offensive coordinator: Gene Dahlquist (1st season)
- Defensive coordinator: Leon Fuller (9th season)
- Home stadium: Texas Memorial Stadium

1992 Southwest Conference football standings
	Conf.					Overall
Team	W		L		T	W		L		T
No. 7 Texas A&M $	7	–	0	–	0	12	–	1	–	0
Baylor	4	–	3	–	0	7	–	5	–	0
Rice	4	–	3	–	0	6	–	5	–	0
Texas	4	–	3	–	0	6	–	5	–	0
Texas Tech	4	–	3	–	0	5	–	6	–	0
SMU	2	–	5	–	0	5	–	6	–	0
Houston	2	–	5	–	0	4	–	7	–	0
TCU	1	–	6	–	0	2	–	8	–	1
$ – Conference champion; Rankings from AP Poll

The 1992 Texas Longhorns football team represented the University of Texas at Austin as a member of the Southwest Conference (SWC) during the 1992 NCAA Division I-A football season. Led by first-year head coach John Mackovic, the Longhorns compiled an overall record of 6–5 with a mark of 4–3 in conference play, placing in a four-way tie for second in the SWC. The team played home games at Texas Memorial Stadium in Austin, Texas.

== Schedule ==
Date	Time	Opponent	Rank	Site	TV	Result	Attendance	Source
September 5	6:30 p.m.	No. 21 Mississippi State*		Texas Memorial Stadium; Austin, TX	ESPN	L 10–28	70,438	
September 12	2:30 p.m.	at No. 9 Syracuse*		Carrier Dome; Syracuse, NY	ABC	L 21–31	49,238	
September 26	7:00 p.m.	North Texas*		Texas Memorial Stadium; Austin, TX		W 33–15	61,864	
October 3	1:00 p.m.	at Rice		Rice Stadium; Houston, TX (rivalry)		W 23–21	41,100	
October 10	2:30 p.m.	vs. No. 16 Oklahoma*		Cotton Bowl; Dallas, TX (Red River Shootout)	ABC	W 34–24	75,587	
October 24	12:00 p.m.	Houston		Texas Memorial Stadium; Austin, TX	Raycom	W 45–38	66,038	
October 31	12:00 p.m.	at Texas Tech	No. 25	Jones Stadium; Lubbock, TX (rivalry)	Raycom	W 44–33	50,741	
November 7	12:00 p.m.	at TCU	No. 20	Amon G. Carter Stadium; Fort Worth, TX (rivalry)	Raycom	L 14–23	26,112	
November 14	1:00 p.m.	SMU		Texas Memorial Stadium; Austin, TX		W 35–14	61,248	
November 21	12:00 p.m.	at Baylor		Floyd Casey Stadium; Waco, TX (rivalry)	Raycom	L 20–21	39,110	
November 26	7:00 p.m.	No. 4 Texas A&M		Texas Memorial Stadium; Austin, TX (rivalry)	ESPN	L 13–34	81,170	
*Non-conference game; Rankings from AP Poll released prior to the game; All times are in Central time; Source:

== Game summaries ==
=== Oklahoma ===
No. 16 Oklahoma Sooners (3–1) vs. Texas Longhorns (2–2)

Quarter	1	2	3	4	Total
Texas	7	10	10	7	34
Oklahoma	7	3	0	14	24

at Cotton Bowl, Dallas, Texas

- Date: October 10, 1992
- Game weather: Clear, 83 °F (28 °C)
- Game attendance: 75,587
- Referee: Thomas
- Box Score

Game information

First quarter

- OU – P.J. Mills 9-yard pass from Cale Gundy (Scott Blanton kick), 11:50. Oklahoma 7–0. Drive: 7 plays, 80 yards.
- UT – Justin McLemore 22-yard pass from Peter Gardere (Scott Szeredy kick), 6:33. Tie 7–7. Drive: 11 plays, 91 yards.

Second quarter

- UT – Scott Szeredy 25-yard field goal, 12:35. Texas 10–7. Drive: 8 plays, 19 yards.
- OU – Scott Blanton 51-yard field goal, 8:29. Tie 10–10. Drive: 11 plays, 51 yards.
- UT – Jason Burleson 31-yard pass from Peter Gardere (Scott Szeredy kick), 3:09. Texas 17–10. Drive: 10 plays, 80 yards.

Third quarter

- UT – Phil Brown 13-yard run (Scott Szeredy kick), 13:06. Texas 24–10. Drive: 6 plays, 70 yards.
- UT – Scott Szeredy 27-yard field goal, 5:16. Texas 27–10. Drive: 9 plays, 69 yards.

Fourth quarter

- UT – Phil Brown 3-yard run (Scott Szeredy kick), 14:27. Texas 34–10. Drive: 4 plays, 42 yards.
- OU – Corey Warren 17-yard pass from Cale Gundy (pass good), 7:42. Texas 34–18. Drive: 8 plays, 71 yards.
- OU – Earnest Williams 25-yard pass from Cale Gundy (run failed), 2:02. Texas 34–24. Drive: 4 plays, 57 yards.

Top passers

- UT – Peter Gardere – 18/32, 274 yards, 2 TD, INT
- OU – Cale Gundy – 17/38, 276 yards, 2 TD, 3 INT

Top rushers

- UT – Curtis Jackson – 15 rushes, 75 yards
- OU – Kenyon Rasheed – 13 rushes, 56 yards

Top receivers

- UT – Darrick Duke – 3 receptions, 77 yards
- OU – Corey Warren – 9 receptions, 187 yards, TD

== Personnel ==
1992 Texas Longhorns football team roster
Players
Coaches
Offense

Pos.	#	Name	Class
WR	83	Mike Adams	Fr
RB	29	Phil Brown	Jr
TE	91	Jason Burleson	Sr
RB	37	Gerald Crawford	Jr
WR	48	Darrick Duke	Sr
QB	10	Peter Gardere	Sr
RB	33	Anthony Holmes	Fr
RB	39	Curtis Jackson	Fr
WR	22	Justin McLemore	So
QB	12	Shea Morenz	Fr
WR	6	Kenny Neal	Jr
WR	4	Cosmo Palmieri	Jr
WR	80	Lovell Pinkney	Fr

Defense

Pos.	#	Name	Class
DB	8	Van Malone	Sr

Special teams

Pos.	#	Name	Class
K	3	Scott Szeredy	Jr

Head coach

- John Mackovic

Coordinators/assistant coaches

- Gene Dahlquist
- Leon Fuller

Legend

- (C) Team captain
- (S) Suspended
- (I) Ineligible
- Injured
- Redshirt
