= Trevone Boykin =

American football player (born 1993)

Profile
- Position: Quarterback

Personal information
- Born: August 22, 1993 (age 33); Mesquite, Texas, U.S.
- Listed height: 6 ft 0 in (1.83 m)
- Listed weight: 213 lb (97 kg)

Career information
- High school: West Mesquite
- College: TCU (2011–2015)
- NFL draft: 2016: undrafted

Career history
- Seattle Seahawks (2016–2017); Galgos de Tijuana (2023–2024); Dinos de Saltillo (2025)

Awards and highlights
- LFA passing touchdowns leader (2023); 2× Second-team All-American (2014, 2015); Big 12 Offensive Player of the Year (2014); Earl Campbell Tyler Rose Award (2014); Kellen Moore Award (2014); First-team All-Big 12 (2014); Second-team All-Big 12 (2015)

Career NFL statistics
- Passing completions: 13
- Passing attempts: 18
- Completion percentage: 72.2
- TD–INT: 1–1
- Passing yards: 145
- Passer rating: 91.2
- Stats at Pro Football Reference

Trevone Dequan Boykin (born August 22, 1993) is an American professional football quarterback. He played college football for the TCU Horned Frogs, twice earning second-team All-American honors. He was signed by the Seattle Seahawks of the National Football League (NFL) as an undrafted free agent in 2016.

== Early life ==
Boykin attended West Mesquite High School in Mesquite, Texas, where he was a letterman in football and track. In football, Boykin rushed for 1,380 yards with 24 scores on the ground and completed 53.2 percent (116-of-218) of his pass attempts for 1,666 yards and 10 touchdowns through the air as a junior. He was named district MVP and earned an honorable-mention All-state as a senior, after rushing for 1,799 yards with 30 touchdowns, while also completing 60.7 percent (198-of-326) of his passes for 2,930 yards with 28 touchdowns and just 11 interceptions.

Also a standout track & field athlete, Boykin competed in events ranging from the 100-meters to the long jump. At the 2010 District 15-4A Meet, he placed 1st in the 200-meter dash (23.50 s) and 3rd in the long jump (21 ft, 6 in). He recorded a personal-best time of 11.10 seconds in the 100-meter dash at the 2011 MISD Invitational, where he took 7th. Also a member of the West Mesquite relay teams, he ran the second leg in the 4 × 100 m relay squad at the 2011 Longhorn Relays, helping them earn a second-place finish at 39.71 seconds. In addition, he also ran 4.5-second 40-yard dash.

Boykin was regarded as a three-star recruit by Rivals.com. He committed to Texas Christian University (TCU) in June 2010 to play college football. He chose TCU over UTEP.

== College career ==
Boykin was redshirted as a freshman in 2011. Boykin entered 2012 as a backup to Casey Pachall. After Pachall was suspended, Boykin took over as the starting quarterback. Overall, he started nine games, completing 167-of-292 passes for 2,054 yards, 15 touchdowns and 10 interceptions. He also rushed for 417 yards and three touchdowns. As a sophomore in 2013, Boykin split time with Pachall. Overall, he started six games at quarterback and one as a wide receiver. During the season, he became the first player in TCU history to have a 200-yard passing, 100-yard rushing and 100-yard receiving game in one season. He finished the season with 1,198 passing yards, seven passing touchdowns, 313 rushing yards, seven rushing touchdowns and 204 receiving yards on 26 receptions.

Boykin entered his junior season in 2014 as the starting quarterback. Boykin passed for 3,901 yards and threw 33 touchdowns and 10 interceptions, while also rushing for an additional 707 yards and 8 touchdowns. Boykin led the Frogs to a #3 ranking and 12–1 record, culminating with a 42–3 victory over #9 Ole Miss in the 2014 Peach Bowl, where Boykin was selected as the Offensive MVP. He was selected to the First-Team All Big 12 team, won the Big 12 Offensive Player of the Year award, and finished in 4th place in the 2014 Heisman Trophy voting.

Boykin returned as the starter for his senior year in 2015. Overall, he started 11 games, missing a game due to injury. He passed for 3,575 yards with 31 touchdowns and 10 interceptions.

For his collegiate career, Boykin completed 830 of 1,356 passes, good for a completion percentage of 61.2%, with 86 touchdowns and 37 interceptions. He added 2,049 rushing yards and 27 rushing touchdowns. This totaled in 12,776 all-purpose yards on offense. He also totaled 113 total touchdowns. Those impressive stats earned him a spot in the 2016 NFLPA Collegiate Bowl.

== Professional career ==
Pre-draft measurables
Height	Weight	Arm length	Hand span	Wingspan	40-yard dash	10-yard split	20-yard split	20-yard shuttle	Vertical jump	Broad jump
6 ft 0 in (1.83 m)	212 lb (96 kg)	31 5/8 in (0.80 m)	9 3/8 in (0.24 m)	6 ft 4 in (1.93 m)	4.77 s	1.66 s	2.76 s	4.40 s	32.0 in (0.81 m)	9 ft 2 in (2.79 m)
All values from NFL Combine

=== Seattle Seahawks ===
Boykin signed with the Seattle Seahawks as an undrafted free agent following the 2016 NFL draft. Boykin opened the 2016 preseason as the Seahawks' primary backup behind starter Russell Wilson ahead of Jake Heaps. In his first preseason game against the Kansas City Chiefs, Boykin completed 16 of 26 passes for 188 yards and one touchdown. He led an 88-yard game-winning drive that was capped off with a 37-yard pass to Tanner McEvoy as time expired. The Seahawks would go on to win, 17–16. Heaps was waived following the preseason, leaving Boykin as the lone backup quarterback on the roster.

Boykin threw his first regular season NFL touchdown pass (16 yards to Doug Baldwin) on September 25, 2016, at home against the San Francisco 49ers in the fourth quarter. Boykin had entered the game midway through the third quarter, with the game already largely in hand, after starter Russell Wilson suffered an MCL sprain. The Seahawks won the game, 37–18. As a rookie in 2016, Boykin appeared in five games and finished the year with 145 passing yards with a touchdown and an interception.

Boykin entered the 2017 preseason competing with Austin Davis to backup Wilson. Although Boykin started his preseason well, he threw 4 interceptions in his final 2 games while Davis threw no picks during preseason. On September 2, 2017, Boykin was waived, officially losing the job to Davis, and was signed to the practice squad the next day. He signed a reserve/future contract with the Seahawks on January 2, 2018.

In the wake of domestic assault allegations, the Seahawks released Boykin on March 27, 2018.

=== Galgos de Tijuana ===
On January 18, 2023, following his release from prison, Boykin signed with the Galgos de Tijuana of the Mexican Liga de Fútbol Americano Profesional (LFA) ahead of the 2023 LFA season. On November 7, 2023, Boykin signed with the Massachusetts Pirates of the Indoor Football League (IFL), but decided to return to the Galgos de Tijuana.

=== Dinos de Saltillo ===
On February 7, 2025, Boykin signed with the Dinos de Saltillo ahead of the 2025 LFA season.

== Career statistics ==
=== NFL ===
Year	Team	Games		Passing								Rushing			
Year	Team	GP	GS	Cmp	Att	Pct	Yds	Y/A	TD	Int	Rtg	Att	Yds	Avg	TD
2016	SEA	5	0	13	18	72.2	145	8.1	1	1	91.2	8	1	0.1	0
Career		5	0	13	18	72.2	145	8.1	1	1	91.2	8	1	0.1	0

=== College ===
Year	Team	Games			Passing								Rushing			
Year	Team	GP	GS	Record	Comp	Att	Pct	Yards	Avg	TD	Int	Rate	Att	Yards	Avg	TD
2011	TCU	Redshirt (redshirt)														
2012	TCU	12	9	3−6	167	292	57.2	2,054	7.0	15	10	126.4	127	417	3.3	3
2013	TCU	12	6	2−4	105	176	59.7	1,198	6.8	7	7	122.0	105	313	3.0	7
2014	TCU	13	13	12−1	301	492	61.2	3,901	7.9	33	10	145.9	152	707	4.7	8
2015	TCU	11	11	10−1	257	396	64.9	3,575	9.0	31	10	161.5	123	612	5.0	9
Career		48	39	27−12	830	1,356	61.2	10,728	7.9	86	37	143.1	507	2,049	4.0	27

== Legal troubles ==
On December 31, 2015, two days prior to the 2016 Alamo Bowl, which was to be Boykin's final college game, he was arrested in San Antonio, Texas after a bar fight in which he threw a punch that hit a patrol officer. He was charged with assaulting a public servant, a third degree felony, assigned a $5,000 bond, and suspended from the game. He also was charged for public intoxication and resisting arrest. Boykin pleaded no contest, and received a year of probation. As part of his probation, he was ordered to attend alcohol awareness sessions and anger management classes. He was also fined $1,500, and ordered to undergo 80 hours of community service.

On March 27, 2017, Boykin was arrested in Dallas, Texas, for misdemeanor charges of possession of marijuana and public intoxication. He was in the passenger seat of a car that, while backing up at high speeds, struck pedestrians on a nearby sidewalk and then the side of a local bar. The driver was charged with two counts of felony intoxication assault with a vehicle. Boykin was held on a $500 bond at the Dallas County Jail. On April 6, 2017, Boykin was arrested in Texas for a possible violation of his probation.

On March 27, 2018, a report was made that Boykin had broken his girlfriend's (Shabrika Bailey) jaw during an altercation the previous week. Subsequently, Boykin was released by the Seahawks. He was later charged with aggravated assault causing bodily injury. In June 2019, he was given additional charges of aggravated assault of a family member with a deadly weapon and tampering with a witness following the March 2018 incident. On November 6, 2019, Boykin was arrested for violating conditions of his bond. While still in police custody on December 9, he was charged with misdemeanor theft for failing to pay for a hotel stay from October 29. He was charged with an additional two counts of misdemeanor theft on December 30 after agreeing to sell TCU memorabilia, receiving payments, and refusing to deliver them in January 2019. On February 27, 2020, Boykin was sentenced to three years in prison for the assault on Bailey after pleading guilty to aggravated assault and witness tampering.
