= Matthew Tucker =

American football player (born 1991)

No. 39
- Position: Running back

Personal information
- Born: May 24, 1991 (age 35); Tyler, Texas, U.S.
- Listed height: 6 ft 1 in (1.85 m)
- Listed weight: 227 lb (103 kg)

Career information
- High school: Chapel Hill
- College: TCU
- NFL draft: 2013: undrafted

Career history
- Philadelphia Eagles (2013–2015); New York Jets (2016)*
- * Offseason or practice squad member only
- Stats at Pro Football Reference

Matthew Tucker (born May 24, 1991) is an American former professional football running back. He played college football at TCU. Tucker signed as an undrafted free agent with the Philadelphia Eagles in 2013.

== Early life ==
He was selected to the first-team all-state. He was named as the Class 3A Offensive Player of the Year in high school.

== Professional career ==
=== Philadelphia Eagles ===
On April 27, 2013, he signed with the Philadelphia Eagles as an undrafted free agent. He was released on August 30, 2014 Tucker signed with the Eagles Practice Squad on August 31, 2014. He was waived by the Eagles on July 27, 2015, a few days before the start of training camp.

=== New York Jets ===
The New York Jets signed Tucker on August 4, 2016. He was waived/injured on August 13, 2016 after not appearing in New York's first preseason game. After going unclaimed on waivers, Tucker reverted to the team's injured reserve list. Tucker reached an injury settlement with the Jets and was released from the reserve list on September 6, 2016.
