= Pete Hoener =

American football coach (born 1951)

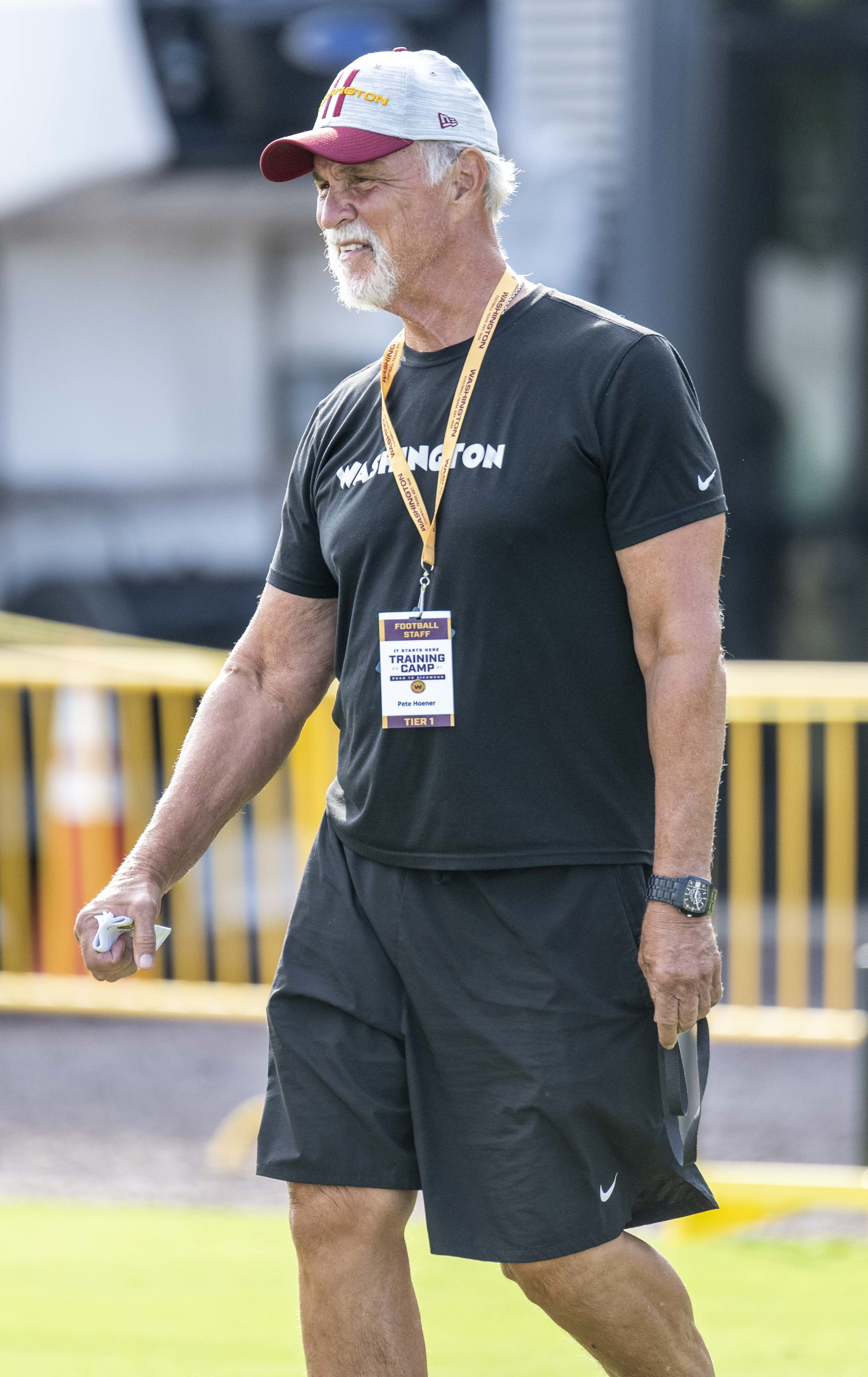
- Hoener with the Washington Football Team in 2021

Personal information
- Born: June 14, 1951 (age 75); Peoria, Illinois, U.S.

Career information
- High school: Richwoods (Peoria)
- College: Bradley

Career history
- Missouri (1975–1976) Graduate assistant; Illinois State (1977) Offensive line coach; Indiana State (1978–1984) Offensive coordinator/offensive line coach; St. Louis Cardinals (1985–1986) Tight ends coach; Illinois (1987–1988) Offensive line coach; Purdue (1989–1991) Offensive line coach; TCU (1992–1997) Offensive coordinator/offensive line coach; Iowa State (1998–1999) Offensive coordinator/offensive line coach; Texas A&M (2000) Running backs coach; Arizona Cardinals (2001–2002) Tight ends coach; Arizona Cardinals (2003) Offensive line coach; Chicago Bears (2004) Offensive line coach; San Francisco 49ers (2005–2010) Tight ends coach; Carolina Panthers (2011–2019) Tight ends coach; Washington Football Team (2020–2021) Tight ends coach

Pete Hoener (born June 14, 1951) is an American former football coach. He previously served as an assistant coach in the National Football League (NFL) for the St. Louis Cardinals, Arizona Cardinals, Chicago Bears, San Francisco 49ers, Carolina Panthers, and Washington Football Team. Hoener retired in 2022 after being in coaching since the 1970s.
