= Josh Boyce =

American football player (born 1991)

No. 82
- Position: Wide receiver

Personal information
- Born: May 6, 1991 (age 35); Columbia, South Carolina, U.S.
- Listed height: 5 ft 11 in (1.80 m)
- Listed weight: 205 lb (93 kg)

Career information
- High school: Copperas Cove (Copperas Cove, Texas)
- College: Texas Christian
- NFL draft: 2013: 4th round, 102nd overall pick

Career history
- New England Patriots (2013–2015); Indianapolis Colts (2016)*; Cleveland Browns (2016–2017)*
- * Offseason or practice squad member only

Awards and highlights
- Super Bowl champion (XLIX); First-team All-MWC (2011)

Career NFL statistics
- Receptions: 9
- Receiving yards: 121
- Stats at Pro Football Reference

Josh Caleb Boyce (born May 6, 1991) is an American former professional football player who was a wide receiver in the National Football League (NFL). He was selected by the New England Patriots in the fourth round of the 2013 NFL draft. He played college football for the TCU Horned Frogs.

== Early life ==
A native of Copperas Cove, Texas, Boyce attended Copperas Cove High School. He played high school football for the Copperas Cove Bulldawgs, with Robert Griffin III under center. He was named an honorable-mention all-state his senior year, after recording 42 receptions for 837 yards, and was instrumental in Copperas Cove's 13-2 season. He played for the A&T Bears in Copperas Cove, leading them to back to back championship games.

In addition to football, Boyce was also on the school's track & field team. He recorded a personal-best time of 11.47 seconds in the 100 meters, He was also a member of the 4 × 100 m (42.60) and 4 × 200 m (1:28.74) relay squads.

== College career ==
Boyce attended Texas Christian University, where he played for the TCU Horned Frogs football team from 2009 to 2012. During his college career, he started 33 of 39 games in which he appeared, and caught 161 passes for 2,535 receiving yards and 22 touchdowns. In TCU's football history, he ranks second in touchdown receptions, third in receiving yards, and fourth in total receptions.

== Professional career ==
Pre-draft measurables
Height	Weight	Arm length	Hand span	40-yard dash	10-yard split	20-yard split	20-yard shuttle	Three-cone drill	Vertical jump	Broad jump	Bench press
5 ft 11 1/8 in (1.81 m)	206 lb (93 kg)	31 1/4 in (0.79 m)	9 1/4 in (0.23 m)	4.38 s	1.54 s	2.59 s	4.10 s	6.68 s	34 in (0.86 m)	10 ft 11 in (3.33 m)	22 reps
All values from NFL Combine

=== New England Patriots ===
He was selected by the New England Patriots in the fourth round, with the 102nd overall pick, of the 2013 NFL draft. Boyce was selected with a toe injury and did not participate in the Patriots' rookies-only training camp in early May. On May 24, the Patriots signed Boyce to his rookie deal worth $2.367 million over four years. Boyce only recorded nine receptions during his rookie year before being placed on injured reserve. He was waived by the Patriots on August 30, 2014, as part of final roster cuts, then signed to New England's practice squad the next day. After spending most of the 2014 season on the Patriots' practice squad, Boyce was called up from the practice squad on December 27 after Alfonzo Dennard was placed on season-ending injured reserve. Boyce was on the Patriots roster for their win over the Seattle Seahawks in Super Bowl XLIX but was inactive. On August 31, 2015, Boyce was waived by the Patriots and after clearing waivers was placed on the injury reserve list.

=== Indianapolis Colts ===
On April 7, 2016, Boyce signed with the Indianapolis Colts. He was released by Indianapolis on August 16, following the team's first preseason game.

=== Cleveland Browns ===
Boyce was signed by the Cleveland Browns on August 21, 2016. On August 29, he was waived by the Browns. On September 14, Boyce was re-signed to the Browns' practice squad. He signed a reserve/future contract with the Browns on January 2, 2017. Boyce was released on September 1, during roster cutdowns.
