= Max Knake =

American football player (born 1973)

Profile
- Position: Quarterback

Personal information
- Born: April 11, 1973 (age 53)
- Listed height: 6 ft 2 in (1.88 m)
- Listed weight: 207 lb (94 kg)

Career information
- High school: McKinney (McKinney, Texas)
- College: Texas Christian (1992–1995)
- NFL draft: 1996: undrafted

Career history
- Winnipeg Blue Bombers (1996)*; Dallas Cowboys (1997–1998)*; Grand Rapids Rampage (2000)
- * Offseason or practice squad member only

Awards and highlights
- First-team All-SWC (1994)

Career AFL statistics
- Comp. / Att.: 41 / 81
- Passing yards: 458
- TD–INT: 8–4
- QB rating: 71.94
- Rushing TDs: 1
- Stats at ArenaFan.com

Max Knake (born April 11, 1973; pronounced knock-ee) is an American former football quarterback. He played college football at Texas Christian University, and professionally for the Grand Rapids Rampage of the Arena Football League (AFL). He was also an offseason member of the Winnipeg Blue Bombers of the Canadian Football League (CFL) and the Dallas Cowboys of the National Football League (NFL).

== Early life ==
Max Knake was born on April 11, 1973. He attended McKinney High School in McKinney, Texas.

== College career ==
Knake was a four-year letterman for the TCU Horned Frogs of Texas Christian University from 1992 to 1995. As a freshman in 1992, he completed 32 of 73 passes (43.8%) for 379 yards, three touchdowns, and three interceptions. In 1993, he recorded 207 completions on 357 passing attempts (58.0%) for 2,130 yards, 12 touchdowns, and 14 interceptions while also scoring one rushing touchdowns. His 357 pass attempts were the most in the Southwest Conference (SWC) that season. In 1994, Knake totaled 184 completions on 316 attempts (58.2%) for 2,624 yards, 24 touchdowns, and seven interceptions, and one rushing touchdown, earning Associated Press first-team All-SWC honors. His completions, attempts, passing yards, and passing touchdowns were the highest in the SWC that year. His 8.3 yards per attempt and 148.6 passer rating also led the SWC. As a senior in 1995, Knake completed 199 of 369 passes (53.9%) for 2,237 yards, 10 touchdowns, and 13 interceptions. His 13 interceptions were the most in the SWC in 1995.

== Professional career ==
After going undrafted in the 1996 NFL draft, Knake signed a two-year contract with the Winnipeg Blue Bombers of the Canadian Football League on May 31, 1996. He was released on June 15, 1996.

Knake was signed by the Dallas Cowboys in April 1997. He was released on August 17, 1997. He signed with the Cowboys again on March 24, 1998. He was released again on July 27, 1998.

Knake signed with the Grand Rapids Rampage of the Arena Football League on March 22, 2000. He played in 14 games for the Rampage during the 2000 season, completing 41 of 81 passes (50.6%) for 458 yards, eight touchdowns, and four interceptions while also rushing for one touchdown.
