= Cory Rodgers =

American gridiron football player (born 1983)

Profile
- Positions: Slotback, Wide receiver, Kick returner

Personal information
- Born: March 22, 1983 (age 43); Houston, Texas, U.S.
- Listed height: 6 ft 0 in (1.83 m)
- Listed weight: 186 lb (84 kg)

Career information
- High school: Hightower (Missouri City, Texas)
- College: Texas Christian University
- NFL draft: 2006: 4th round, 104th overall pick

Career history
- 2006: Green Bay Packers*
- 2006: San Francisco 49ers*
- 2007–2009: BC Lions
- 2009: Toronto Argonauts
- * Offseason or practice squad member only

Awards and highlights
- Second-team All-American (2005); First-team All-MW (2005)
- Stats at CFL.ca

Dacor Tremaine "Cory" Rodgers (born February 22, 1983) is an American former professional football wide receiver. He played college football for Texas Christian University.

== Early life ==
Rodgers attended Hightower High School in Missouri City, Texas and was a student and a letterman in football. In football, he played quarterback for the Hurricanes, and was a two-time All-District selection, and as a senior, he was an All-State selection. During his junior and senior years, he accounted for 62 touchdowns (37 passing, 25 rushing) and over 5,000 yards of total offense.

== College career ==
During Rodgers' three seasons playing at TCU (2003–2005), he was a crowd favorite with the fans in Fort Worth and even had his own official fan club. This was due to his exceptional athleticism, versatility, and aggressive play. Cory Rodgers has the nickname "CO-RO", this can be seen since Cory has a tattoo of "CO" on the back of his left calf and "RO" on his right. Cory Rodgers wore the number 17 during his tenure at TCU.

As a redshirt freshman in 2003, he was second on the team with 37 receptions for 590 yards and 5 touchdowns. He also rushed 17 times for 39 yards and 3 touchdowns, and averaged 22.1 yards per return on kickoffs and 11.0 yards per return on punts. His 861 total return yards broke the school record previously set by Heisman Trophy winner Davey O'Brien in 1937. He was honored on the Conference USA All-Freshman as both a wide receiver and punt returner and was the third-team punt returner on the All-CUSA team.

As a sophomore in 2004, he led the team with 61 receptions for 836 yards and 7 touchdowns. He also rushed 12 times for 35 yards and 2 touchdowns, and averaged 23.3 yards per return on kickoffs and 10.2 yards per return on punts. His 906 total return yards broke his own school record. He was honored on the All-CUSA team as the third-team wide receiver and kick returner.

As a junior in 2005, he again led the team with 52 receptions for 685 yards and 5 touchdowns. He also rushed 17 times for 41 yards and 5 touchdowns, and averaged 30.3 yards per return on kickoffs and 15.3 yards per return on punts. He had two kick returns for touchdowns (87 yards vs. SMU, 100 yards vs. BYU), which tied him for the most in the nation. He was honored by the Mountain West Conference as the first-team All-MWC return specialist and as a third-team wide receiver. He was named the first-team All-America kick returner by ESPN, Sports Illustrated and the Walter Camp Football Foundation.

After the 2005 season, Cory decided to forgo his senior season and declared himself eligible for the 2006 NFL draft.

== Professional career ==
Pre-draft measurables
Height	Weight	Arm length	Hand span	40-yard dash	10-yard split	20-yard split	20-yard shuttle	Three-cone drill	Vertical jump	Broad jump
5 ft 11 7/8 in (1.83 m)	188 lb (85 kg)	31 7/8 in (0.81 m)	9 in (0.23 m)	4.59 s	1.62 s	2.70 s	4.19 s	7.37 s	33.5 in (0.85 m)	9 ft 2 in (2.79 m)
All values from NFL Combine

On April 30, 2006, Rodgers was selected by the Green Bay Packers in the fourth round of the 2006 NFL draft, the 104th overall pick. In May 2006, Rodgers was arrested for his role in a fight outside of a Fort Worth bar, but was later given probation.

On July 25, 2006, Rodgers officially signed a contract with the Green Bay Packers, but on September 2, 2006, Rodgers was released by the Packers in the final round of cuts to the 53 man roster to begin the 2006 season. On September 4, 2006, Rodgers signed to the San Francisco 49ers practice squad but was later released on September 26, 2006.

In June of the 2007 CFL season, Rodgers made his debut with the BC Lions of the Canadian Football League. In his debut season with the Lions, he caught 27 passes for 351 yards and for 3 touchdowns. He was released on July 8, 2009.

On July 23, 2009, he was signed to the practice roster of the Toronto Argonauts. Rodgers was later activated and played in his first game as an Argonaut on August 1, 2009, at home against the Winnipeg Blue Bombers. In his Argo debut, Rodgers had 6 receptions for 54 yards while also making 1 punt return for 11 yards. Rodgers was later released by the Argos on September 1, 2009.
