= Michael Reeder =

American football player

No. 17
- Position: Placekicker

Career information
- College: TCU (1994—1997)

Awards and highlights
- Lou Groza Award (1995); Consensus All-American (1995); First-team All-SWC (1995)

Michael Reeder is an American former football placekicker who played college football for the TCU Horned Frogs, where he won the Lou Groza Award and was recognized as a consensus All-American.

== College career ==
In his sophomore season, Reeder won the 1995 Lou Groza Award as the top kicker in college football and was also named a consensus member of the 1995 College Football All-America Team. He has a wife named Heidi Reeder. He has three kids named David, Mila, and Jody.

Upon completion of his college career, Reeder held TCU records for points by a kicker (259), field goal attempts in a season (25), field goal attempts in a career (76), field goals made in a season (23), field goals made in a career (57), consecutive PATs made (79), and longest field goal (57 yards).
