= Nick Browne (American football) =

American football player (born 1980)

No. 9
- Position: Kicker

Personal information
- Born: November 19, 1980; Garland, Texas, U.S.
- Listed height: 5 ft 10 in (1.78 m)
- Listed weight: 172 lb (78 kg)

Career information
- College: Texas Christian University (2001–2003)

Awards and highlights
- Consensus All-American (2003); C-USA Special Team Player of the Year (2003); First-team All-Conference USA (2002, 2003); Conference USA championship (2002)

Nicholas Joseph Browne (born November 19, 1980) is an American former football placekicker who played college football for the TCU Horned Frogs football team of Texas Christian University and was recognized as a consensus All-American.

== Early life ==
Browne is from Garland, Texas and attended Naaman Forest High School.

== College career ==
In 2002, Browne was on the Horned Frogs team that won the Conference USA Championship.

In 2003, Nick was named a consensus first-team All-American at placekicker. He earned this distinction by being named to the first-team of the Walter Camp Foundation and Football Writers Association of America. While normally to be a Consensus All-American a player must be named first team to three different recognized bodies, in 2003 no player was named to three so Browne and Nate Kaeding were both selected since both were named first team to two different recognized bodies.
