= Jimmy Young (American football) =

American football player (born 1987)

Profile
- Position: Wide receiver

Personal information
- Born: 1987 (age 38–39); Monroe, Louisiana
- Listed height: 6 ft 1 in (1.85 m)
- Listed weight: 208 lb (94 kg)

Career information
- College: TCU
- NFL draft: 2011: undrafted

Career history
- Chicago Bears (2011)*; Pittsburgh Steelers (2012)*
- * Offseason or practice squad member only

Jimmy Young (born 1987) is an American former football wide receiver who played professionally for the Pittsburgh Steelers of the National Football League (NFL). He played college football at TCU.

== College career ==
Young played his college football at TCU. He became the favorite target for Andy Dalton in the 2008 season, his redshirt sophomore year, catching 59 balls for a team leading 988 yards and 5 touchdowns. In his junior and senior years he was overtaken as the primary target by Jeremy Kerley, but remained productive. He played a big role in the Rose Bowl win over Wisconsin by grabbing 5 balls for 57 yards, converting multiple first downs. Young is a member of Kappa Alpha Psi fraternity.

== NFL career ==
=== Chicago Bears ===
Young went undrafted in the 2011 NFL draft. He signed with the Chicago Bears as an undrafted free agent hours after the draft. He was released as a final cut and remained a free agent for the rest of the 2011 season.

=== Pittsburgh Steelers ===
On January 3, 2012, the Pittsburgh Steelers agreed to sign Young.
