= Matt Vogler =

American football player (born 1969)

Profile
- Position: Quarterback

Personal information
- Born: September 25, 1969 (age 57)
- Listed height: 6 ft 3 in (1.91 m)
- Listed weight: 210 lb (95 kg)

Career information
- High school: Robinson (Tampa, Florida)
- College: Texas Christian

Career history
- Massachusetts Marauders (1994); Miami Hooters (1995)

Career AFL statistics
- Comp. / Att.: 15 / 26
- Passing yards: 114
- TD–INT: 0–0
- QB rating: 68.43
- Stats at ArenaFan.com

Matt Vogler (born September 25, 1969) is an American former professional football quarterback who played two seasons in the Arena Football League with the Massachusetts Marauders and Miami Hooters. He played college football at Auburn University and Texas Christian University.

== Early life ==
Vogler first played high school football at A. P. Leto High School in Tampa, Florida before transferring to play at Thomas Richard Robinson High School in Tampa. He was an All County All Suncoast selection as a senior. He threw for a school record 2,817 yards and broke the record for touchdowns in a season with 23. Vogler's 281.7 yard per game average was second best in the nation in 1986 and fourth best in state history at that time.

== College career ==
Vogler first played college football for the Auburn Tigers.

Vogler transferred to play for the TCU Horned Frogs. He threw for an NCAA Division I record 690 yards in a game in 1990.

== Professional career ==
Vogler played for the Massachusetts Marauders in 1994.

Vogler played for the Miami Hooters in 1995.
