= Casey Pachall =

American football player (born 1990)

No. 4
- Position: Quarterback

Personal information
- Born: November 14, 1990 (age 35); Brownwood, Texas, U.S.
- Listed height: 6 ft 4 in (1.93 m)
- Listed weight: 216 lb (98 kg)

Career information
- High school: Brownwood (TX)
- College: TCU
- NFL draft: 2014: undrafted

Career history
- Toronto Argonauts (2014); Calgary Stampeders (2014)*; Blacktips (2014); Hudson Valley Fort (2015); Spring League East (2017)
- * Offseason or practice squad member only

Awards and highlights
- Second-team All-MWC (2011)
- Stats at Pro Football Reference

Casey Pachall (born November 14, 1990) is an American former professional football quarterback. He played college football for the Horned Frogs of Texas Christian University.

== Early life ==
Pachall attended Brownwood High School in Brownwood, Texas. He took over the role as Brownwood's quarterback when Shelby Miller suffered a staph infection. When Miller returned, he did so as a wide receiver. As a senior, he passed for 2,808 yards with 31 touchdowns and 11 interceptions.

== College career ==
After being redshirted as a freshman in 2009, Pachall spent 2010 as Andy Dalton's backup. He appeared in eight games and attempted nine passes with six completions for 78 yards and a touchdown. He also ran for 94 yards on 15 attempts with two touchdowns.

In 2011, Pachall took over as the starting quarterback. After seven games, Pachall had completed 131 of 188 passes for 1,566 yards and 17 touchdowns. At that point, his quarterback rating of 165.2 ranked ninth among all NCAA FBS quarterbacks.

He was arrested on Thursday, October 4, 2012, and charged with DWI. At the time, he was suspended indefinitely; playing without Pachall that Saturday, TCU lost its first game of the season, 37–23, to Iowa State. On October 9, TCU announced that Pachall would withdraw from TCU to enter an inpatient rehab facility for substance abuse treatment.

Pachall was named TCU's starting quarterback for 2013. He started their opening game against LSU. By the close of his Horned Frog career he held impressive all-time rankings. After 24 games he led in completion percentage (62.9) and ranked third in passing yards (5,415), completions (431), and touchdown passes (42).

=== College statistics ===
Year	Team	Games			Passing								Rushing			
Year	Team	GP	GS	Record	Comp	Att	Pct	Yards	Avg	TD	Int	Rate	Att	Yards	Avg	TD
2009	TCU	Redshirt (redshirt)														
2010	TCU	8	0	—	6	9	66.7	78	8.7	1	0	176.1	15	94	6.3	2
2011	TCU	13	13	11−2	228	343	66.5	2,921	8.5	25	7	158.0	68	51	0.8	2
2012	TCU	4	4	4−0	64	97	66.0	948	9.8	10	1	180.0	21	23	1.1	0
2013	TCU	7	6	2−4	133	236	56.4	1,468	6.2	6	10	108.5	31	24	0.8	1
Career		32	23	17−6	431	685	62.9	5,415	7.9	42	18	144.3	135	192	1.4	5

== Professional career ==
Pachall entered the 2014 NFL draft but was not selected. On May 16, 2014, Pachall was signed as a free agent by the Toronto Argonauts of the Canadian Football League. He made the final cut and was on the roster but did not see any playing time. He was listed as inactive through the first 10 games and was released by Toronto on September 6, 2014. He was signed to the Calgary Stampeders practice roster on September 17, 2014. He was released on October 13, 2014.

Pachall was on the developmental league Fall Experimental Football League's Hudson Valley Fort team as starting quarterback at the beginning of the 2015 season. He participated in The Spring League Showcase game on July 15, 2017, on the East team. He completed 4-for-6 passes for 84 yards and a 67-yard touchdown.
