= 1991 Iowa Hawkeyes football team =

American college football season

1991 Iowa Hawkeyes football

Holiday Bowl, T 13–13 vs. BYU
- Conference: Big Ten Conference

Ranking
- Coaches: No. 10
- AP: No. 10
- Record: 10–1–1 (7–1 Big Ten)
- Head coach: Hayden Fry (13th season)
- Offensive coordinator: Carl Jackson (3rd season)
- Offensive scheme: Pro-style
- Defensive coordinator: Bill Brashier (13th season)
- Base defense: 5–2
- Captains: Rob Baxley; John Derby; Matt Rodgers; Leroy Smith
- Home stadium: Kinnick Stadium

1991 Big Ten Conference football standings
	Conf.					Overall
Team	W		L		T	W		L		T
No. 6 Michigan $	8	–	0	–	0	10	–	2	–	0
No. 10 Iowa	7	–	1	–	0	10	–	1	–	1
Ohio State	5	–	3	–	0	8	–	4	–	0
Indiana	5	–	3	–	0	7	–	4	–	1
Illinois	4	–	4	–	0	6	–	6	–	0
Purdue	3	–	5	–	0	4	–	7	–	0
Michigan State	3	–	5	–	0	3	–	8	–	0
Wisconsin	2	–	6	–	0	5	–	6	–	0
Northwestern	2	–	6	–	0	3	–	8	–	0
Minnesota	1	–	7	–	0	2	–	9	–	0
$ – Conference champion; Rankings from AP Poll

The 1991 Iowa Hawkeyes football team was an American football team that represented the University of Iowa as a member of the Big Ten Conference during the 1991 NCAA Division I-A football season. In their 13th year under head coach Hayden Fry, the Hawkeyes compiled a 10–1–1 record (7–1 in conference games), finished in second place in the Big Ten, and outscored opponents by a total of 330 to 166. In games against ranked opponents, they lost to No. 7 Michigan and defeated No. 13 Illinois, No. 13 Ohio State and No. 25 Indiana. They concluded the season with a tie game against unranked BYU in the 1991 Holiday Bowl. They were ranked No. 10 in the final AP and UPI polls.

The team's statistical leaders included quarterback Matt Rodgers with 2,054 passing yards, running back Mike Saunders with 919 rushing yards, and wide receiver Danan Hughes with 43 receptions for 757 yards eight touchdowns. Defensive end Leroy Smith was a consensus first-team All-American and was selected as the Big Ten Defensive Player of the Year and recorded 18 sacks, including five in Iowa’s 16–9 win over Ohio State.

The team played its home games at Kinnick Stadium in Iowa City, Iowa.

== Schedule ==
Date	Time	Opponent	Rank	Site	TV	Result	Attendance	Source
September 7	11:30 am	Hawaii*	No. 15	Kinnick Stadium; Iowa City, IA	ESPN	W 53–10	70,044	
September 14	11:30 am	at Iowa State*	No. 14	Cyclone Stadium; Ames, IA (rivalry)	ABC	W 29–10	54,469	
September 28	1:00 pm	Northern Illinois*	No. 9	Kinnick Stadium; Iowa City, IA		W 58–7	70,220	
October 5	2:30 pm	No. 7 Michigan	No. 9	Kinnick Stadium; Iowa City, IA	ABC	L 24–43	70,220	
October 12	1:00 pm	at Wisconsin	No. 17	Camp Randall Stadium; Madison, WI (rivalry)		W 10–6	75,053	
October 19	2:30 pm	No. 13 Illinois^{†}	No. 15	Kinnick Stadium; Iowa City, IA	ABC	W 24–21	70,220	
October 26	11:30 am	at Purdue	No. 11	Ross–Ade Stadium; West Lafayette, IN	ESPN	W 31–21	32,932	
November 2	2:30 pm	at No. 13 Ohio State	No. 11	Ohio Stadium; Columbus, OH	ABC	W 16–9	95,357	
November 9	2:30 pm	No. 25 Indiana	No. 10	Kinnick Stadium; Iowa City, IA	ABC	W 38–21	70,220	
November 16	1:00 pm	at Northwestern	No. 9	Dyche Stadium; Evanston, IL		W 24–10	33,478	
November 23	1:00 pm	Minnesota	No. 9	Kinnick Stadium; Iowa City, IA (rivalry)		W 23–8	32,500	
December 30	7:30 pm	vs. BYU*	No. 7	San Diego Stadium; San Diego, CA (Holiday Bowl)	ESPN	T 13–13	60,646	
*Non-conference game; ^{†}Homecoming; Rankings from AP Poll released prior to the game; All times are in Central time; Source:

== Rankings ==
Ranking movements Legend: ██ Increase in ranking ██ Decrease in ranking
	Week															
Poll	Pre	1	2	3	4	5	6	7	8	9	10	11	12	13	14	Final
AP	18	15	14	10	9	9	17	15	11	11	10	9	9	7	7	10
Coaches	18	17	14	10	8	7	17	11	8	8	8	7	8	7	7	10

== Game summaries ==
=== Hawaii ===
Hawaii at #15 Iowa

Team	1	2	3	4	Total
Rainbow Warriors	0	3	0	7	10
• No. 15 Hawkeyes	27	14	6	6	53

- Date: September 7
- Location: Kinnick Stadium, Iowa City, Iowa
- Game attendance: 70,044
- Game weather: 91 °F (33 °C)
- Television network: ESPN
- Sources: Box Score and Game Story

Scoring summary
1	13:49	IOWA	Hughes 18-yard pass from Rodgers (Skillett kick)	IOWA 7–0
1		IOWA	Bradley 10-yard blocked punt return (Skillett kick)	IOWA 14–0
1		IOWA	Montgomery 1-yard run (Skillett kick)	IOWA 21–0
1		IOWA	Filloon 8-yard pass from Rodgers (kick blocked)	IOWA 27–0
2		Hawaii	Jason Elam 35-yard field goal	IOWA 27–3
2		IOWA	Montgomery 1-yard run (Skillett kick)	IOWA 34–3
2		IOWA	Montgomery 1-yard run (Skillett kick)	IOWA 41–3
3		IOWA	Hilliard blocked punt for safety	IOWA 43–3
3		IOWA	Saunders 27-yard run (Skillett kick)	IOWA 50–3
4	12:53	IOWA	Skillett 30-yard field goal	IOWA 53–3
4		Hawaii	Lewis 35-yard pass from Jasper (Elam kick)	IOWA 53–10

This game was essentially over at halftime as Iowa cruised to start the season 1-0.

=== At Iowa State ===
#14 Iowa at Iowa State
Cy-Hawk Trophy

Team	1	2	3	4	Total
• No. 14 Hawkeyes	17	3	2	7	29
Cyclones	0	3	0	7	10

- Date: September 14
- Location: Jack Trice Stadium
  Ames, IA
- Game start: 11:30 AM CDT
- Game attendance: 54,469
- Television network: ABC
- Sources: Box Score and Game Story

Scoring summary
1	IOWA	Hughes 46-yard pass from Rodgers (Skillett kick)	IOWA 7–0
1	IOWA	Kujawa 2-yard run (Skillett kick)	IOWA 14–0
1	IOWA	Skillett field goal	IOWA 17–0
2	ISU	Stewart 35-yard field goal	IOWA 17–3
2	IOWA	Skillett 20-yard field goal	IOWA 20–3
3	IOWA	Safety Hilliard blocked punt out of the end zone	IOWA 22–3
4	ISU	Spencer 7-yard pass from Pedersen (Stewart kick)	IOWA 22–10
4	IOWA	Whitaker 28-yard pass from Rodgers (Skillett kick)	IOWA 29–10

Iowa had little trouble getting their ninth consecutive victory in this in-state rivalry contest.

=== Northern Illinois ===
Northern Illinois at #9 Iowa

Team	1	2	3	4	Total
Huskies	0	0	0	7	7
• No. 9 Hawkeyes	7	24	7	20	58

- Date: September 28
- Location: Kinnick Stadium, Iowa City, Iowa
- Game start: 1:00 PM CST
- Game attendance: 70,220

Scoring summary
1	1:10	IOWA	Montgomery 15-yard run (Skillett kick)	Iowa 7–0
2		Iowa	Martens 8-yard pass from Rodgers (Skillett kick)	Iowa 14–0
2		Iowa	Skillett 21-yard field goal	Iowa 17–0
2		Iowa	Leroy Smith fumble recovery in end zone	Iowa 24–0
2		Iowa	Hughes 15-yard pass from Rodgers (Skillett kick)	Iowa 31–0
3		Iowa	Saunders 11-yard run (Skillett kick)	Iowa 38–0
3		Iowa	Kujawa 3-yard run (Skillett kick)	Iowa 45–0
4		Iowa	Jones 12-yard pass from Burmeister (Skillett kick)	Iowa 52–0
4		Iowa	Jones 52-yard pass from Hartlieb (kick blocked)	Iowa 58–0
4	0:34	NIU	Patterson 11-yard pass from Rugal (Roy kick)	Iowa 58–7

=== No. 7 Michigan ===
#7 Michigan at #9 Iowa

Team	1	2	3	4	Total
• No. 7 Wolverines	7	12	7	17	43
No. 9 Hawkeyes	0	18	0	6	24

- Date: October 5
- Location: Kinnick Stadium, Iowa City, Iowa
- Game start: 2:30PM CST
- Game attendance: 70,220

Scoring summary
1	8:26	Mich	21-yard blocked punt return (Carlson kick)	Michigan 7–0
2	14:31	Iowa	Montgomery 1-yard run (Skillett kick failed)	Michigan 7–6
2	12:35	Iowa	Matt Rodgers 8-yard run (Pass failed)	Iowa 12–7
2	6:16	Iowa	Danan Hughes 17-yard pass from Matt Rodgers (Run failed)	Iowa 18–7
2	3:21	Mich	Powers 2-yard run (Pass failed)	Iowa 18–13
2	0:31	Mich	J. Johnson 28-yard pass from E. Grbac (Pass failed)	Michigan 19–18
3	8:25	Mich	D. Howard 20-yard pass from E. Grbac (Carlson kick)	Michigan 26–18
4	13:47	Mich	D. Howard 2-yard pass from E. Grbac (Carlson kick)	Michigan 33–18
4	9:39	Mich	Carlson 25-yard field goal	Michigan 36–18
4	6:52	Iowa	Matt Rodgers 8-yard run (Pass failed)	Michigan 36–24
4	0:34	Mich	J. Johnson 17-yard run (Carlson kick)	Michigan 43–24

In the 1991 Big Ten opener, the Hawkeyes led 18–7 midway through the second quarter, but could not stop the Michigan ground game as the Wolverines rolled up 371 yards rushing on 50 attempts. This game essentially decided the conference championship as both teams won the remainder of their Big Ten games.

Prior to kickoff, 1957 Outland Trophy winner Alex Karras was presented with a plaque from the College Football Hall of Fame.

=== At Wisconsin ===
#17 Iowa at Wisconsin
rivalry Game

Team	1	2	3	4	Total
• No. 17 Hawkeyes	0	3	0	7	10
Badgers	6	0	0	0	6

- Date: October 12
- Location: Camp Randall Stadium
  Madison, WI
- Game start: 1:00 PM CDT
- Game attendance: 75,053
- Sources: Box Score and Game Story

Scoring summary
1		WIS	Troy Vincent 65-yard interception return (kick blocked)	WIS 6–0
2		IOWA	Skillett 29-yard field goal	WIS 6–3
4	0:44	IOWA	Saunders 14-yard pass from Rodgers (Skillett kick)	IOWA 10–6

=== No. 13 Illinois ===
#13 Illinois at #15 Iowa

Team	1	2	3	4	Total
No. 13 Fighting Illini	7	14	0	0	21
• No. 15 Hawkeyes	10	7	0	7	24

- Date: October 19
- Location: Kinnick Stadium, Iowa City, Iowa
- Game attendance: 70,220
- Sources: Box Score and Game Story

Scoring summary
1		Illinois	Kameno Bell 4-yard run (Richardson kick)	Illinois 7–0
1	6:41	Iowa	Alan Cross 10-yard pass from Matt Rodgers (Skillett kick)	Tied 7–7
1		Iowa	Jeff Skillett 24-yard field goal	Iowa 10–7
2		Illinois	5-yard pass from Jason Verduzco (Richardson kick)	Illinois 14–10
2	5:52	Illinois	K. Bell 1-yard run (Richardson kick)	Illinois 21–10
2	1:56	Iowa	Mike Saunders 6-yard pass from Matt Rodgers (Skillett kick)	Illinois 21–17
4	2:39	Iowa	Matt Rodgers 1-yard run (Skillett kick)	Iowa 24–21

The Hawkeyes ended up having a happy homecoming in a game where they were outplayed in the first half in this top 15 showdown.

=== At Purdue ===
#11 Iowa at Purdue

Team	1	2	3	4	Total
• No. 11 Hawkeyes	7	0	24	0	31
Boilermakers	6	9	0	6	21

- Date: October 26
- Location: Ross-Ade Stadium, West Lafayette, Indiana
- Game attendance: 32,932
- Television network: ESPN
- Source: Box Score and Game Story

=== At No. 13 Ohio State ===
#11 Iowa at #13 Ohio State

Team	1	2	3	4	Total
• No. 11 Hawkeyes	0	13	3	0	16
No. 13 Buckeyes	0	9	0	0	9

- Date: November 2
- Location: Ohio Stadium, Columbus, Ohio
- Game start: 3:30 PM EST
- Game attendance: 95,357
- TV announcers (ABC): Brent Musburger and Dick Vermeil
- Source: Box Score and Game Story

Scoring summary
2		IOWA	Rodgers 1-yard run (Skillett kick)	IOWA 7–0
2		OSU	Carlos Snow 2-yard run (kick)	Tied 7–7
2		IOWA	Alan Cross 61-yard pass from Rodgers (kick blocked)	IOWA 13–7
2		OSU	Simmons 85-yard blocked PAT return	IOWA 13–9
3	0:27	IOWA	Skillett 30-yard field goal	IOWA 16–9

The Hawkeyes played without decals on their helmets in honor of the fallen from an on-campus shooting the day before. Leroy Smith recorded a school-record 5 sacks in the road victory over the Buckeyes.

=== No. 25 Indiana ===
#25 Indiana at #10 Iowa

Team	1	2	3	4	Total
No. 25 Hoosiers	0	6	3	12	21
• No. 10 Hawkeyes	21	10	7	0	38

- Date: November 9
- Location: Kinnick Stadium, Iowa City, Iowa
- Game start: 2:40 pm CST
- Game attendance: 70,220
- Game weather: 40 °F (4 °C), Partly sunny, Wind SW 10–15 mph (16–24 km/h)
- Referee: Don Baur
- TV announcers (ABC): Brent Musburger, Dick Vermeil
- Sources: Box Score Archived 2019-11-17 at the Wayback Machine

Scoring summary
1	5:54	Iowa	Saunders 1-yard pass from Jim Hartlieb (Skillett kick)	Iowa 7–0
1	5:09	Iowa	Saunders 14-yard run (Skillett kick)	Iowa 14–0
1	2:37	Iowa	Saunders 19-yard run (Skillett kick)	Iowa 21–0
2	10:28	Iowa	Skillett 26-yard field goal	Iowa 24–0
2	4:46	Indiana	Thomas Lewis 24-yard pass from Trent Green (kick failed)	Iowa 24–6
2	0:26	Iowa	Danan Hughes 26-yard pass from Hartlieb	Iowa 31–6
3	11:27	Indiana	Bonnell 33-yard field goal	Iowa 31–9
3	8:17	Iowa	Saunders 7-yard run (Skillett kick)	Iowa 38–9
4	13:44	Indiana	Lewis 11-yard pass from Trent Green (run failed)	Iowa 38–15
4	10:39	Indiana	Vaughn Dunbar 11-yard run (run failed)	Iowa 38–21

Mike Saunders became the fifth Iowa player to score four touchdowns in a game, tying the school record. The Iowa defense forced four interceptions from Indiana quarterback Trent Green.

=== At Northwestern ===
#9 Iowa at Northwestern

Team	1	2	3	4	Total
• No. 9 Hawkeyes	3	7	14	0	24
Wildcats	0	10	0	0	10

- Date: November 16
- Location: Dyche Stadium
- Game attendance: 33,478
- Sources: Box Score and Game Story

Scoring summary
1	IOWA	Skillett 25-yard field goal	IOWA 3–0
2	NW	Leahy 30-yard field goal	Tied 3–3
2	IOWA	Hughes 1-yard pass from Hartlieb (Skillett kick)	IOWA 10–3
2	NW	Williams 3-yard run (Leahy kick)	Tied 10–10
3	IOWA	Saunders 7-yard run (Skillett kick)	IOWA 17–10
3	IOWA	Montgomery 1-yard run (Skillett kick)	IOWA 24–10

=== Minnesota ===
Minnesota at #9 Iowa

Team	1	2	3	4	Total
Golden Gophers	0	0	0	8	8
• No. 9 Hawkeyes	0	3	7	13	23

- Date: November 23
- Location: Kinnick Stadium, Iowa City, Iowa
- Game attendance: 32,500
- Game weather: 28 °F (−2 °C), Snow
- Sources: Box Score and Game Story

Scoring summary
2	0:00	Iowa	Jeff Skillett 32-yard field goal	Iowa 3–0
3		Iowa	Alan Cross 12-yard pass from Matt Rodgers (Skillett kick)	Iowa –-0
4		Iowa	Danan Hughes 45-yard pass from Matt Rodgers (Skillett kick)	Iowa 17–0
4		Iowa	Danan Hughes 32-yard pass from Matt Rodgers (kick failed)	Iowa 23–0
4	1:33	Minn	Paul Hopewell 19-yard pass from Scott Schaffner (two-point conversion)	Iowa 23–8

External videos
- 1991 Minnesota at Iowa – News recap

The Hawkeyes closed the regular season with a win in the snow, giving Coach Fry his 100th victory at Iowa.

=== Vs. BYU (Holiday Bowl) ===
#7 Iowa vs. BYU

Team	1	2	3	4	Total
No. 7 Hawkeyes	6	7	0	0	13
Cougars	0	6	0	7	13

- Date: December 30
- Location: Jack Murphy Stadium, San Diego, California
- Game attendance: 60,646
- TV announcers (ESPN): Steve Physioc and Gary Danielson

Scoring summary
1		Iowa	Mike Saunders 13-yard run (extra point missed)	Iowa 6–0
2		Iowa	Mike Saunders 5-yard run (Skillett kick)	Iowa 13–0
2		BYU	Tuipulotu 9-yard pass from Ty Detmer (extra point missed)	Iowa 13–6
4	11:36	BYU	Tyler Anderson 29-pass from Ty Detmer (Kauffman kick)	Tied 13–13

== Roster ==
1991 Iowa Hawkeyes football team roster
Players
Coaches
Offense

Pos.	#	Name	Class
OT	78	Rob Baxley	Sr
TE	87	Alan Cross	Jr
OT	65	Scott Davis	Jr
C	60	Mike Devlin	Jr
G	55	Mike Ferroni
WR	82	Jon Filloon	Sr
WR	3	Danan Hughes	Jr
WR	83	Harold Jasper	Fr
WR	80	Kenny Jones	Sr
FB	34	Lew Montgomery	Jr
OL		Lance Olberding	Sr
QB	7	Matt Rodgers	Sr
RB	32	Mike Saunders	Sr
OL	61	Dave Turner	Sr
OL	73	Ted Velicer	Jr
FB	46	Matt Whitaker	Jr
RB	23	Paul Kujawa	Jr

Defense

Pos.	#	Name	Class
DL	91	Bret Bielema	Jr
DE	95	Larry Blue	So
FS	19	Gary Clark	Sr
NG	88	Maurea Crain	So
NG	54	Rod Davis	Sr
LB	31	John Derby	Sr
LB	49	Teddy Joe Faley	Jr
DE	96	Ron Geater	Sr
DB	5	Carlos James	Jr
DT	93	Jeff Nelson	Jr
CB	6	Scott Plate	So
CB	27	Eddie Polly	Sr
DE	8	Leroy Smith	Sr
DL	64	Mike Wells	So
SS	15	Brian Wise	Sr

Special teams

Pos.	#	Name	Class
K	11	Jeff Skillett	Sr

Head coach

- Hayden Fry

Coordinators/assistant coaches

- Carl Jackson – Offensive Coordinator
- Bill Brashier – Defensive Coordinator
- Milan Vooletich – Defensive ends
- Mike Stoops – Linebackers/Defensive backs
- Bo Pelini – Graduate assistant

Legend

- (C) Team captain
- (S) Suspended
- (I) Ineligible
- Injured
- Redshirt

== Statistics ==
Team statistics. On offense, the Hawkeyes gained an average of 225.1 passing yards and 182.1 rushing yards per game. They ranked second in the Big Ten in scoring offense with an average of 28.6 points per game. On defense, they gave up an averag of 145.7 passing yards and 125.8 rushing yards per game. They led the Big Ten in scoring defense, giving up an average of 14.9 points per game.

Passing. Quarterback Matt Rodgers completed 166 of 255 passes (65.1%) for 2,054 yards, 14 touchdowns, 10 interceptions, and a 143.0 passer rating.

Rushing. Mike Saunders led the team in rushing with 919 yards on 197 carries (4.7 yards per carry). Saunders also led the team in scoring with 78 points.

Receiving. Wide receiver Danan Hughes led the team with 38 receptions for 709 yards. Tight end Alan Cross ranked second with 484 receiving yards on 30 catches.

Defense. Defensive end Leroy Smith had 17 quarterback sacks, breaking Larry Bethea's pevious Big Ten record of 16. He also broke the Iowa record with 22 tackles for loss.

== Awards and honors ==
Hayden Fry and Michigan's Gary Moeller were selected as co-Big Ten Coach of the Year.

Defensive end Leroy Smith was a consensus pick for the 1991 All-America college football team, receiving first-team honors from Kodak/American Football Coaches Association (AFCA) and the Associated Press (AP). He was also chosen as the co-Big Ten Defensive Player of the Year and the Big Ten Defensive Lineman of the Year.

Center Mike Devlin received second-team All-America honors from the UPI. He was named to the third team by the Associated Press (AP). Fry called him "a catalyst" who "gets everybody fired up" and who will "beat you thinking and he'll beat you phsycially."

Smith and Devlin also received first-team honors on the 1981 All-Big Ten Conference football team. Quarterback Matt Rodgers, tackle Rob Baxley, linebacker John Derby, and defensive end Ron Geater were named to the second team.

== 1992 NFL draft ==
The following Hawkeyes were selected in the 1992 NFL draft after the season.

Round	Pick	Player	Position	NFL team
7	170	Ron Geater	Defensive end	Denver Broncos
7	172	Lance Olberding	Tackle	Cincinnati Bengals
10	262	Mike Saunders	Running back	Pittsburgh Steelers
11	286	Rob Baxley	Tackle	Phoenix Cardinals
12	335	Matt Rodgers	Quarterback	Buffalo Bills
