= 1991 Holiday Bowl =

1991 Thrifty Car Rental Holiday Bowl
- 14th Holiday Bowl Game
Iowa Hawkeyes	BYU Cougars
(10–1)	(8-3–1)
Big Ten	WAC
13	13
Head coach: Hayden Fry	Head coach: LaVell Edwards
AP / Coaches; 7 / 7
	1	2	3	4	Total
Iowa	6	7	0	0	13
BYU	0	6	0	7	13
- Date: December 30, 1991
- Season: 1991
- Stadium: Jack Murphy Stadium
- Location: San Diego, California
- MVP: Offensive: Ty Detmer (BYU); Defensive: Josh Arnold (BYU)
- Referee: Larry Fisher Jr. (Big 8)
- Halftime show: Marching bands
- Attendance: 60,646
- Payout: US$1,303,940 per team

United States TV coverage
- Network: ESPN
- Announcers: Steve Physioc and Gary Danielson

The 1991 Holiday Bowl was a college football bowl game played December 30, 1991, in San Diego, California. It was part of the 1991 NCAA Division I-A football season. It featured the seventh ranked Iowa Hawkeyes, and the unranked BYU Cougars. The teams played to a 13–13 tie.

== Game summary ==
- Iowa - Mike Saunders 13-yard run (kick failed)
- Iowa - Saunders 5-yard run (Skillett kick)
- BYU - Peter Tuipulotu 9-yard pass from Ty Detmer (kick failed)
- BYU - Scotty Anderson 26-yard pass from Detmer (Kauffman kick)

Iowa scored on a 13-yard touchdown run from tailback Mike Saunders, opening up a 6–0 lead, for the first quarter's only points. In the second quarter, Saunders added a 5-yard run, putting the Hawkeyes up 13–0. Ty Detmer's 9 yard scoring strike to Peter Tuipulotu making it 13–6. In the fourth quarter, Detmer found Tyler Anderson for a 29-yard strike, as BYU evened the score at 13-13.

With 4:19 remaining in the game, BYU got the ball on their 23-yard line. After six plays, the Cougars reached the Hawkeye 18-yard line. The ensuing play resulted in Detmer's only interception when his pass deflected off his intended receiver and was intercepted by co-Defensive MVP Carlos James, who also had 4 tackles. BYU had 80 rushing yards, 350 passing yards, 1 turnover, 64 return yards, and 32:23 time of possession. Iowa had 125 rushing yards, 221 passing yards, 1 turnover, 38 return yards, and 27:37 time of possession. Ty Detmer went 29-of-44 for 350 yards, two touchdowns and one interception. Josh Arnold had eight tackles (with three being for losses, which totaled to 33 yards lost by Iowa) while being named defensive MVP.

It was the first and only tie ever in the Holiday Bowl, and it was also the lowest scoring Holiday Bowl. It was the final college game for Detmer, who won the Heisman Trophy the previous season. This is also the last tie football game in major college football bowl history.
