= 1991 All-Big Ten Conference football team =

1991 All-Big Ten: USA

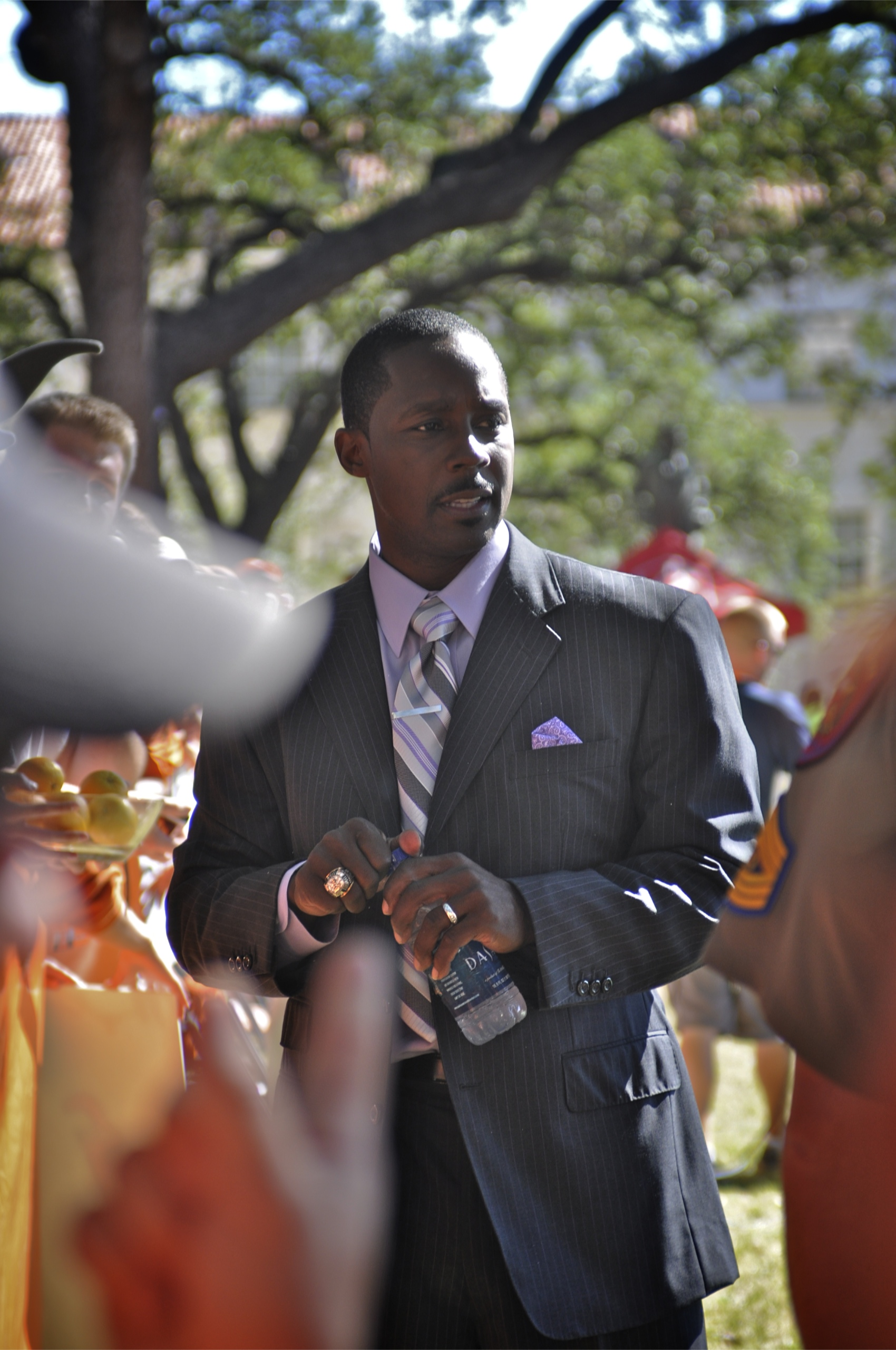
1991 Heisman Trophy winner Desmond Howard

The 1991 All-Big Ten Conference football team consists of American football players chosen as All-Big Ten Conference players for the 1991 college football season. The only organization that has been found to have selected an All-Big Ten team in 1991 was the Associated Press (AP), based on voting by the media.

The AP's All-Big Ten team was led by Michigan receiver Desmond Howard who was named the Big Ten Offensive Player of the Year and Iowa defensive end Leroy Smith and Wisconsin cornerback Troy Vincent who were named the Big Ten Defensive Players of the Year. Howard led the conference with 985 receiving yards, 21 touchdowns from scrimmage, and 19 receiving touchdowns. Howard also won multiple national player of the year awards, winning the Heisman Trophy, Maxwell Award and Walter Camp Player of the Year Award.

The 1991 Michigan Wolverines football team were undefeated in conference play and won the conference football championship. In addition to Desmond Howard, Michigan quarterback Elvis Grbac led the conference with a 161.7 passing efficiency rating and 25 passing touchdowns, and was selected as the first-team All-Big Ten quarterback for three consecutive years, receiving the honor in 1991, 1992 and 1993. Six other Michigan players received first-team honors from the AP, including running back Ricky Powers (1,197 rushing yards), offensive linemen Matt Elliott and Greg Skrepenak, defensive lineman Mike Evans, linebacker Erick Anderson, and kicker J. D. Carlson. Skrepenak was recognized as the Big Ten Offensive Lineman of the Year, and Michigan head coach Gary Moeller was named the Big Ten Coach of the Year.

The 1991 Iowa Hawkeyes football team under head coach Hayden Fry finished in second place in the conference with a 10–1–1 record, but placed only two players on the AP's all-conference first team. The Iowa honorees were center Mike Devlin and defensive lineman Leroy Smith. Smith was also named the Big Ten Co-Defensive Player of the Year and the Big Ten Defensive Lineman of the Year. Iowa quarterback Matt Rodgers was also selected by the AP as the second-team quarterback.

The 1991 Ohio State Buckeyes football team under head coach John Cooper had four players named to the AP's all-conference first team. The Ohio State honorees were defensive linemen Alonzo Spellman and Jason Simmons, linebacker Steve Tovar, and offensive tackle Alan Kline.

Indiana running back Vaughn Dunbar led the conference with 1,805 rushing yards and was selected as a first-team running back by the AP. Purdue tailback Corey Rogers was selected as the Big Ten Freshman of the Year.

== Offensive selections ==
The following offensive players won All-Big Ten honors.

=== Quarterbacks ===
- Elvis Grbac, Michigan (AP-1)
- Matt Rodgers, Iowa (AP-2)

=== Running backs ===
- Vaughn Dunbar, Indiana (AP-1)
- Ricky Powers, Michigan (AP-1)
- Tico Duckett, Michigan State (AP-2)
- Carlos Snow, Ohio State (AP-2)

=== Receivers ===
- Desmond Howard, Michigan (AP-1)
- Courtney Hawkins, Michigan State (AP-1)
- Mark Benson, Northwestern (AP-2)
- Elbert Turner, Illinois (AP-2)

=== Tight ends ===
- Patt Evans, Minnesota (AP-1)
- Rod Coleman, Indiana (AP-2)

=== Centers ===
- Mike Devlin, Iowa (AP-1)
- Steve Everitt, Michigan (AP-2)

=== Guards ===
- Matt Elliott, Michigan (AP-1)
- Tim Simpson, Illinois (AP-1)
- Chuck Belin, Wisconsin (AP-2)
- Joe Cocozzo, Michigan (AP-2)

=== Tackles ===
- Alan Kline, Ohio State (AP-1)
- Greg Skrepenak, Michigan (AP-1)
- Rob Baxley, Iowa (AP-2)
- Randy Schneider, Indiana (AP-2)

== Defensive selections ==
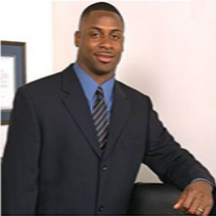
Co-Defensive Player of the Year Troy Vincent of Wisconsin

The following defensive players won All-Big Ten honors.

=== Defensive linemen ===
- Mike Evans, Michigan (AP-1)
- Mike Poloskey, Illinois (AP-1)
- Jason Simmons, Ohio State (AP-1)
- Leroy Smith, Iowa (AP-1)
- Alonzo Spellman, Ohio State (AP-1)
- Greg Farrall, Indiana (AP-2)
- Ron Geater, Iowa (AP-2)
- Greg Smith, Ohio State (AP-2)
- Jeff Zgonina, Purdue (AP-2)

=== Linebackers ===
- Erick Anderson, Michigan (AP-1)
- Chuck Bullough, Michigan State (AP-1)
- Steve Tovar, Ohio State (AP-1)
- John Derby, Iowa (AP-2)
- Dana Howard, Illinois (AP-2)
- Jim Schwantz, Purdue (AP-2)

=== Defensive backs ===
- Sean Lumpkin, Minnesota (AP-1)
- Troy Vincent, Wisconsin (AP-1)
- Jimmy Young, Purdue (AP-1)
- Corwin Brown, Michigan (AP-2)
- Willie Lindsey, Northwestern (AP-2)
- Marlon Primous, Illinois (AP-2)

== Special teams ==
=== Kickers ===
- J. D. Carlson, Michigan (AP-1)
- Scott Bonnell, Indiana (AP-2)

=== Punters ===
- Eric Bruun, Purdue (AP-1)
- Josh Butland, Michigan State (AP-2)

== Other ==
=== Offensive Player of the Year ===
- Desmond Howard, Michigan (AP)

=== Defensive Player of the Year ===
- Erick Anderson, Michigan (AP-tie)
- Troy Vincent, Wisconsin (AP-tie)

=== Freshman of the Year ===
- Corey Rogers, Purdue (AP)

== Key ==
AP-1 = First-team selection for the Associated Press by media balloting

AP-2 = Second-team selection for the Associated Press by media balloting

== See also ==
- 1991 College Football All-America Team
- Big Ten Conference football individual awards
