= Desmond Howard =

American football player (born 1970)

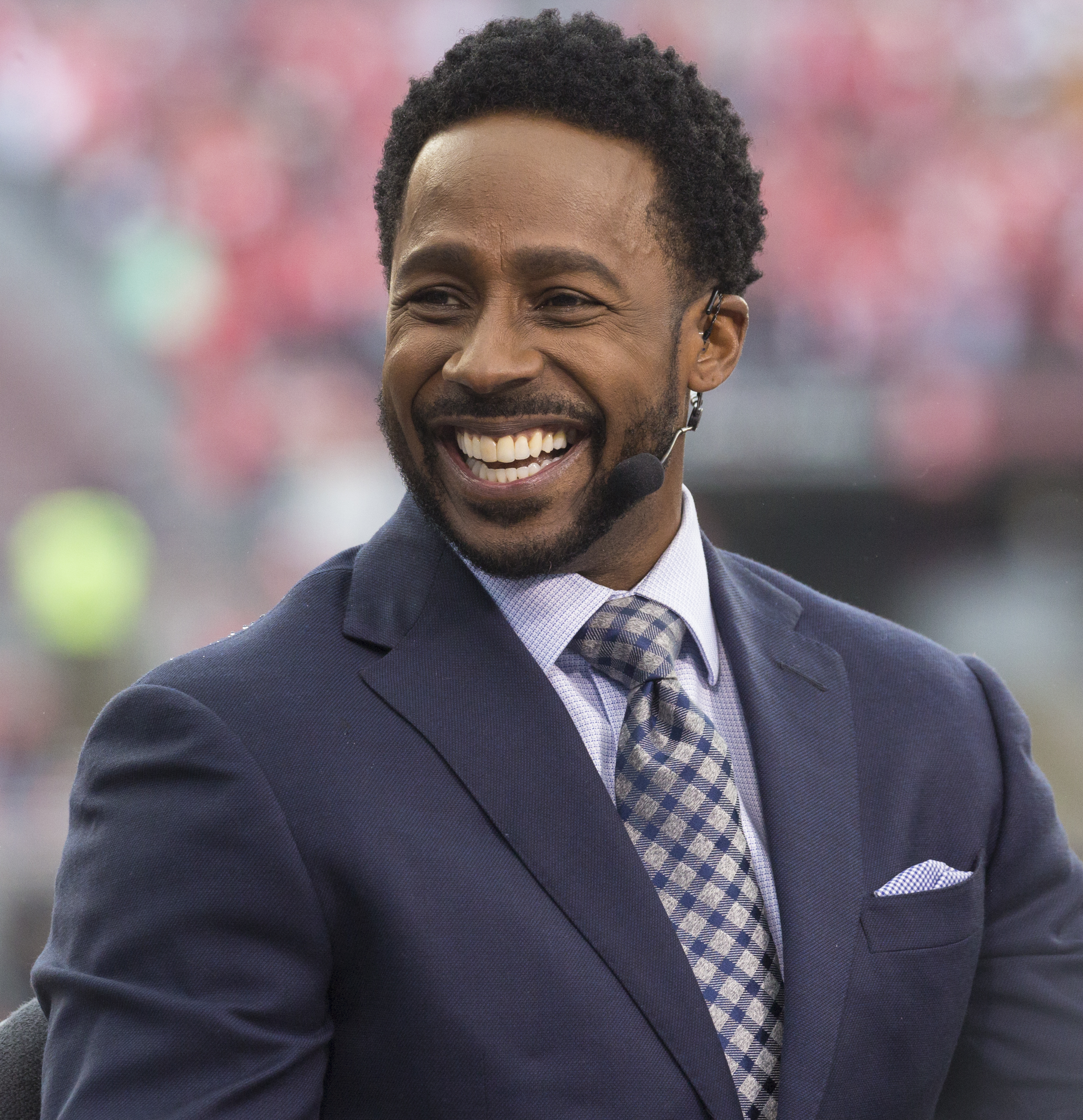
- Howard in 2018

No. 80, 81, 82, 18
- Position: Wide receiver

Personal information
- Born: May 15, 1970 (age 56); Cleveland, Ohio, U.S.
- Listed height: 5 ft 10 in (1.78 m)
- Listed weight: 188 lb (85 kg)

Career information
- High school: St. Joseph (Cleveland)
- College: Michigan (1988–1991)
- NFL draft: 1992: 1st round, 4th overall pick
- Expansion draft: 1995: 28th round, 55th overall pick

Career history
- Washington Redskins (1992–1994); Jacksonville Jaguars (1995); Green Bay Packers (1996); Oakland Raiders (1997–1998); Green Bay Packers (1999); Detroit Lions (1999–2002)

Awards and highlights
- Super Bowl champion (XXXI); Super Bowl MVP (XXXI); First-team All-Pro (1996); Pro Bowl (2000); NFL punt return yards leader (1996); PFWA All-Rookie Team (1992); Heisman Trophy (1991); Unanimous All-American (1991); Third-team All-American (1990); Big Ten Male Athlete of the Year (1992); Second-team AP All-Time All-American (2025); Michigan Wolverines No. 21 retired; NFL record: Most punt return yards in a season: 875 (1996)

Career NFL statistics
- Receptions: 123
- Receiving yards: 1,597
- Receiving touchdowns: 7
- Kickoff return yards: 7,959
- Punt return yards: 2,895
- Return touchdowns: 8
- Stats at Pro Football Reference
- College Football Hall of Fame

Desmond Kevin Howard (born May 15, 1970) is an American former professional football wide receiver who played in the National Football League (NFL) for 11 seasons. He played college football for the Michigan Wolverines, winning the Heisman Trophy in 1991. Howard was selected fourth overall in the 1992 NFL draft by the Washington Redskins. He was also a member of the Jacksonville Jaguars, Green Bay Packers, Oakland Raiders, and Detroit Lions.

A return specialist for most of his career, Howard holds the NFL single season record for punt return yardage, which he set with the Packers in 1996. That same season, Howard was named Most Valuable Player of Super Bowl XXXI after returning a kickoff for a 99-yard touchdown, the longest return in Super Bowl history at the time. He is the only special teams player to win the award. Howard also received a first-team All-Pro selection in 1996 and was named to the Pro Bowl in 2000 with the Lions. Since 2005, he has served as an analyst on ESPN College Gameday. He was inducted to the College Football Hall of Fame in 2010.

== Early life ==
Howard was born in Cleveland, Ohio and earned All-American and All-Ohio honors as a tailback during his senior season at St. Joseph High School in Cleveland, Ohio, scoring 18 touchdowns on 1,499 rushing yards and intercepting 10 passes. For his career he totaled 5,392 rushing yards. He earned three varsity letters each in track and football as well as one in basketball.

== College career ==
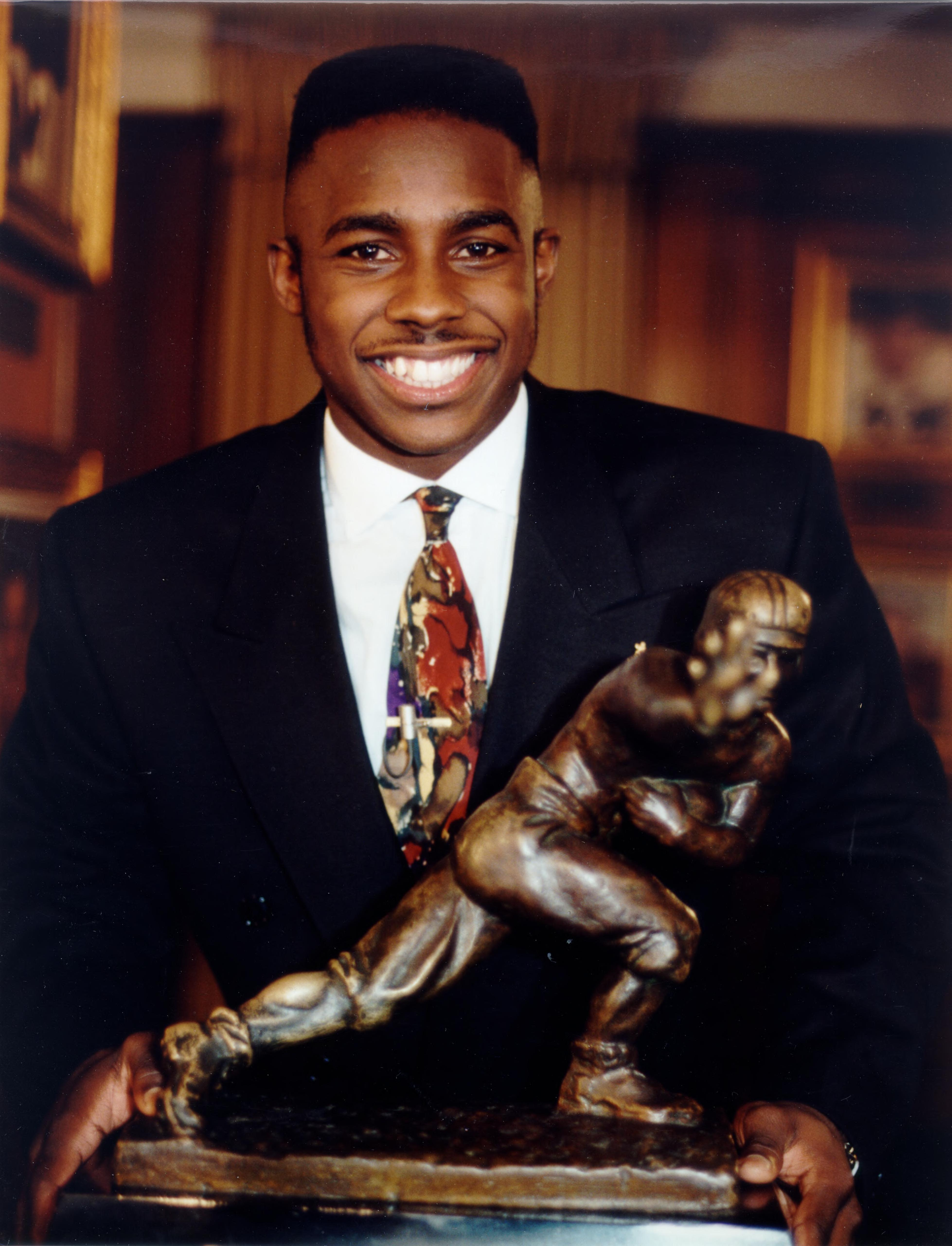
Howard posing with the Heisman Trophy in December 1991.

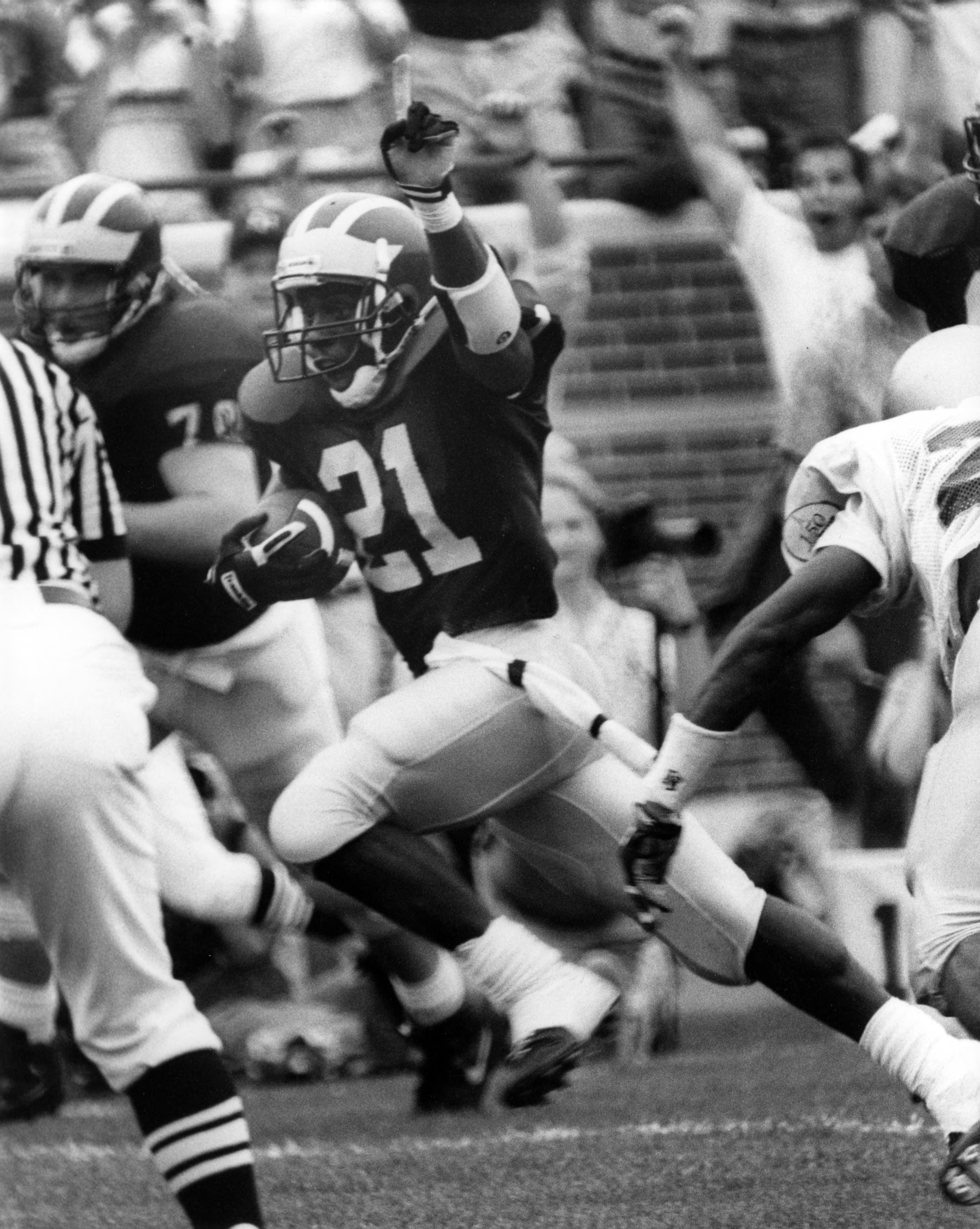
Howard celebrating a touchdown against Notre Dame in September 1991.

Howard played college football at the University of Michigan. During his time there Howard set or tied five NCAA records, and twelve school records, including 19 receiving touchdowns in a single season, the program's current all-time record. In 1991, Howard caught 62 passes for 985 yards and scored 23 total touchdowns, while also rushing for 180 yards and gaining 694 yards on special teams, with an average of 27.5 yards per kickoff return and 14.1 yards per punt return; he also led the nation with 19 receiving touchdowns and co-led in scoring with 138 points. He won the Heisman Trophy, Maxwell Award, and Walter Camp Award, earning unanimous All-American honors. Howard captured 85 percent of the first-place votes in balloting for the Heisman, the largest margin in history at that time. Howard also earned a bachelor's degree in communications in 1992. In 2010, he was inducted into the College Football Hall of Fame and he was honored as the inaugural Michigan Football Legend, a program honoring former players equivalent to a retired jersey number. Each Michigan player to wear Howard's No. 21 jersey was to wear a patch recognizing Howard, and dress at a locker bearing a plaque with his name and time of tenure at Michigan. Howard finished his three seasons at Michigan with 249 rushing yards, 134 receptions for 2,146 yards, 1,211 kickoff return yards, and 339 yards returning punts, while also scoring 37 touchdowns.

Howard had come to Michigan as a tailback and initially struggled for playing time. He met with Michigan counselor Greg Harden, who helped him to build his confidence and achieve success on and off the field. Howard told 60 Minutes in 2014: "If Greg Harden wasn’t at the University of Michigan…I don’t win the Heisman."

On December 12, 2014, the Big Ten Network included Howard on "The Mount Rushmore of Michigan Football", as chosen by online fan voting. Howard was joined in the honor by Charles Woodson, Tom Harmon, and Anthony Carter.

On November 28, 2015, Howard had his #21 officially retired along with Gerald Ford (48), Tom Harmon (98), Ron Kramer (87), Bennie Osterbaan (47), and Albert, Alvin, and Whitey Wistert (11) at a ceremony before the Michigan game against Ohio State. Howard commented afterward, "Any time you have your name mentioned along with Gerald Ford, you've done something right."

=== The Heisman pose ===
Born and raised in Cleveland, Howard was, he later said, "very, very familiar" with the Michigan–Ohio State football rivalry. During the 1991 season, after he became a Heisman contender, Howard decided that he would do "something special" during the Ohio State-Michigan game "as a little shout-out to the people back in Ohio".

Ohio State coach John Cooper ordered his team to avoid giving Howard chances to score. The punt that Howard returned for a touchdown in the game was supposed to go out of bounds, so the Ohio State special teams players were unprepared for him. In the end zone, Howard wanted to do a backflip but, Howard later said, "chickened out"; instead he imitated the pose of the football player on the Heisman trophy bust, immediately receiving much media attention. Comparing his act to Muhammad Ali's taunting of opponents, Steve Rushin observed that although Howard's pose did not closely resemble that of the statue, "that looks more like the Heisman Trophy of our imagination than the Heisman trophy itself ... thousands of people must have instantly picked up some object and tried to do the same thing". Howard later said that "all of a sudden, everyone was doing it"; many have imitated the act, including fellow athletes, celebrities, and Presidents George W. Bush and Barack Obama. Howard said that the pose has become a greeting for fans meeting him, but he avoids doing it himself "because the more I do it, it kind of cheapens it".

== Professional career ==
Pre-draft measurables
Height	Weight	Arm length	Hand span
5 ft 9 7/8 in (1.77 m)	184 lb (83 kg)	30 3/8 in (0.77 m)	8 7/8 in (0.23 m)
All values from NFL Combine

After college, Howard was selected by the Washington Redskins in the first round, fourth overall in the 1992 NFL draft. The pick was considered a luxury for the Redskins, who had just won Super Bowl XXVI and had receivers Art Monk, Gary Clark, and Ricky Sanders on the roster. The Redskins, worried that the Green Bay Packers were going to draft Howard in the fifth spot, leapfrogged above them by dealing their two first-round picks - 6th and 28th - and their third-round choice (84th) to the Cincinnati Bengals for their first-round pick (4th) and their third-round pick (58th). Howard was the highest Redskins draft pick since they took Hall of Fame receiver Charley Taylor with the third pick in 1964. Redskins head coach Joe Gibbs remarked of Howard "This guy doesn't have any flaws. We're excited."

Howard's performance as a receiver was secondary to his skills as a punt and kickoff returner throughout his 11-year career. Though he recorded 92 receptions in his first four seasons, he excelled as a punt and kickoff returner throughout his career.

Howard played one season for the Jacksonville Jaguars in 1995, having been selected in the 1995 NFL expansion draft with the 55th pick. He had 26 receptions and one touchdown, with 10 kick returns.

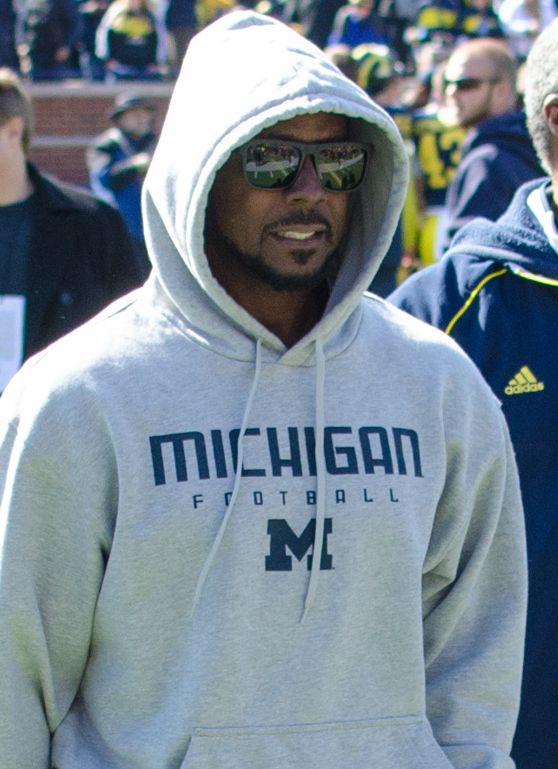
Howard in 2014 while attending a Michigan game

His most notable professional season was in 1996 for the Green Bay Packers. He led the NFL in punt returns (58), punt return yards (875), punt return average (15.1), and punt return touchdowns (3), while gaining 460 kickoff return yards and catching 13 passes for 95 yards. His 875 punt return yards were an NFL record, easily surpassing the old record of 692 yards set by Fulton Walker in 1985. During the 1996 NFL postseason, Howard had a punt return for a touchdown in a game between the Packers and the San Francisco 49ers, and 46-yard punt return that set up another score. However, he did have an odd blunder in the second half, in which he failed to come out of the locker room in time for the start of the third quarter. No one on the team noticed, so the Packers had only 10 men on the field for the second-half kickoff, with no one in the returner position. As a result, San Francisco ran down the field and recovered the kickoff, leading to a 49ers touchdown. Still, the Packers won the game and eventually reached Super Bowl XXXI against the New England Patriots.

Desmond Howard's 99-yard kick return touchdown in the Superdome in Super Bowl XXXI
- Howard returns Adam Vinatieri's kickoff 99 yards for a touchdown in Super Bowl XXXI, January 26, 1997

The Packers led 27–14 at halftime, but Patriots quarterback Drew Bledsoe led his team on a short drive that ended with Curtis Martin's 18-yard touchdown run to pull the Patriots within six points late in the third quarter. The Patriots boomed the ensuing kickoff to the one-yard line, but Howard effectively shattered the Patriots' hopes for a comeback with a 99-yard kickoff return for a Packers touchdown. His return and the Packers' subsequent two-point conversion closed out the scoring of the game, and the Packers eventually won 35–21. Bill Parcells, the Patriots' head coach, commented after the game: "We had a lot of momentum, and our defense was playing better. But [Howard] made the big play. That return was the game right there. He's been great all year, and he was great again today." Howard totaled a Super Bowl record 90 punt return yards and 154 kickoff return yards with one touchdown; his 244 all-purpose yards also tied a Super Bowl record. His performance won him the Super Bowl MVP award, making Howard the only player to ever win the award based solely on a special teams performance. His kickoff return touchdown in the Super Bowl ended up being the only one of his career.

Howard became a free agent after the season and signed with the Oakland Raiders. He led the NFL in kickoff returns (61) and kickoff return yards (1,381). Howard spent the 1998 football season with the Raiders before re-joining the Packers in 1999.

In the middle of the 1999 season, Howard was cut by the Packers after subpar performance and multiple injuries. He was signed by the Detroit Lions four days later, where he spent the rest of his career until his retirement after the 2002 season. In a special homecoming, he scored a special teams touchdown in his Lions debut. In February 2001, he made his first and only Pro Bowl appearance as the NFC's kick returner.

In his 11 NFL seasons, Howard caught 123 passes for 1,597 yards, rushed for 68 yards, returned 244 punts for 2,895 yards, and gained 7,595 yards returning 359 kickoffs. He also scored 15 touchdowns (7 receiving, 8 punt returns). Overall, Howard gained 12,155 all-purpose yards in his professional career.

== NFL career statistics ==
Legend
	Super Bowl MVP
	Won the Super Bowl
	NFL record
	Led the league
**Bold**	Career high

=== Regular season ===
Year	Team	Games		Receiving						Punt returns						Kick returns					Fumbles	
Year	Team	GP	GS	Rec	Yds	Avg	Lng	TD	FD	Ret	Yds	Avg	Lng	TD	FC	Ret	Yds	Avg	Lng	TD	Fum	Lost
1992	WAS	**16**	1	3	20	6.7	8	0	1	6	84	14.0	55	1	3	22	462	21.0	42	0	1	0
1993	WAS	**16**	5	23	286	12.4	27	0	17	4	25	6.3	13	0	0	21	405	19.3	33	0	0	0
1994	WAS	**16**	**15**	**40**	**727**	**18.2**	**81**	**5**	**33**	—	—	—	—	—	—	—	—	—	—	—	0	0
1995	JAX	13	6	26	276	10.6	24	1	15	24	246	10.3	40	0	8	10	178	17.8	24	0	0	0
1996	GB	**16**	0	13	95	7.3	12	0	4	**58**	**875**	15.1	92	**3**	16	22	460	20.9	40	0	2	1
1997	OAK	15	0	4	30	7.5	9	0	0	27	210	7.8	31	0	20	**61**	1,318	21.6	45	0	2	0
1998	OAK	15	1	2	16	8.0	10	0	2	45	541	12.0	75	2	13	49	1,040	21.2	42	0	**4**	**2**
1999	GB	8	—	—	—	—	—	—	—	12	93	7.8	20	0	7	19	364	19.2	31	0	0	0
1999	DET	5	—	—	—	—	—	—	—	6	115	**19.2**	68	1	3	15	298	19.9	35	0	0	0
2000	DET	15	0	2	14	7.0	10	0	0	31	457	14.7	**95**	1	**24**	57	1,401	24.6	70	0	2	1
2001	DET	14	1	10	133	13.3	36	1	5	22	201	9.1	34	0	19	57	**1,446**	**25.4**	**91**	0	1	1
2002	DET	7	—	—	—	—	—	—	—	9	48	5.3	14	0	5	26	587	22.6	70	0	0	0
Career		156	29	123	1,597	13.0	81	7	77	244	2,895	11.9	95	8	118	359	7,959	22.2	91	0	12	5

== Awards and honors ==
NFL

- Super Bowl champion (XXXI)
- Super Bowl MVP (XXXI)
- First-team All-Pro (1996)
- Pro Bowl (2000)
- NFL punt return yards leader (1996)
- PFWA All-Rookie Team (1992)

College

- Heisman Trophy (1991)
- Maxwell Award (1991)
- Walter Camp Award (1991)
- UPI Player of the Year (1991)
- SN Player of the Year (1991)
- Chic Harley Award (1991)
- Paul Warfield Trophy (1991)
- Unanimous All-American (1991)
- Third-team All-American (1990)
- NCAA receiving touchdowns leader (1991)
- NCAA scoring co-leader (1991)
- Big Ten Male Athlete of the Year (1992)
- Big Ten Most Valuable Player (1991)
- Big Ten Offensive Player of the Year (1991)
- 2× First-team All-Big Ten (1990, 1991)
- Second-team AP All-Time All-American (2025)
- Michigan Wolverines No. 21 retired

== Broadcasting career ==
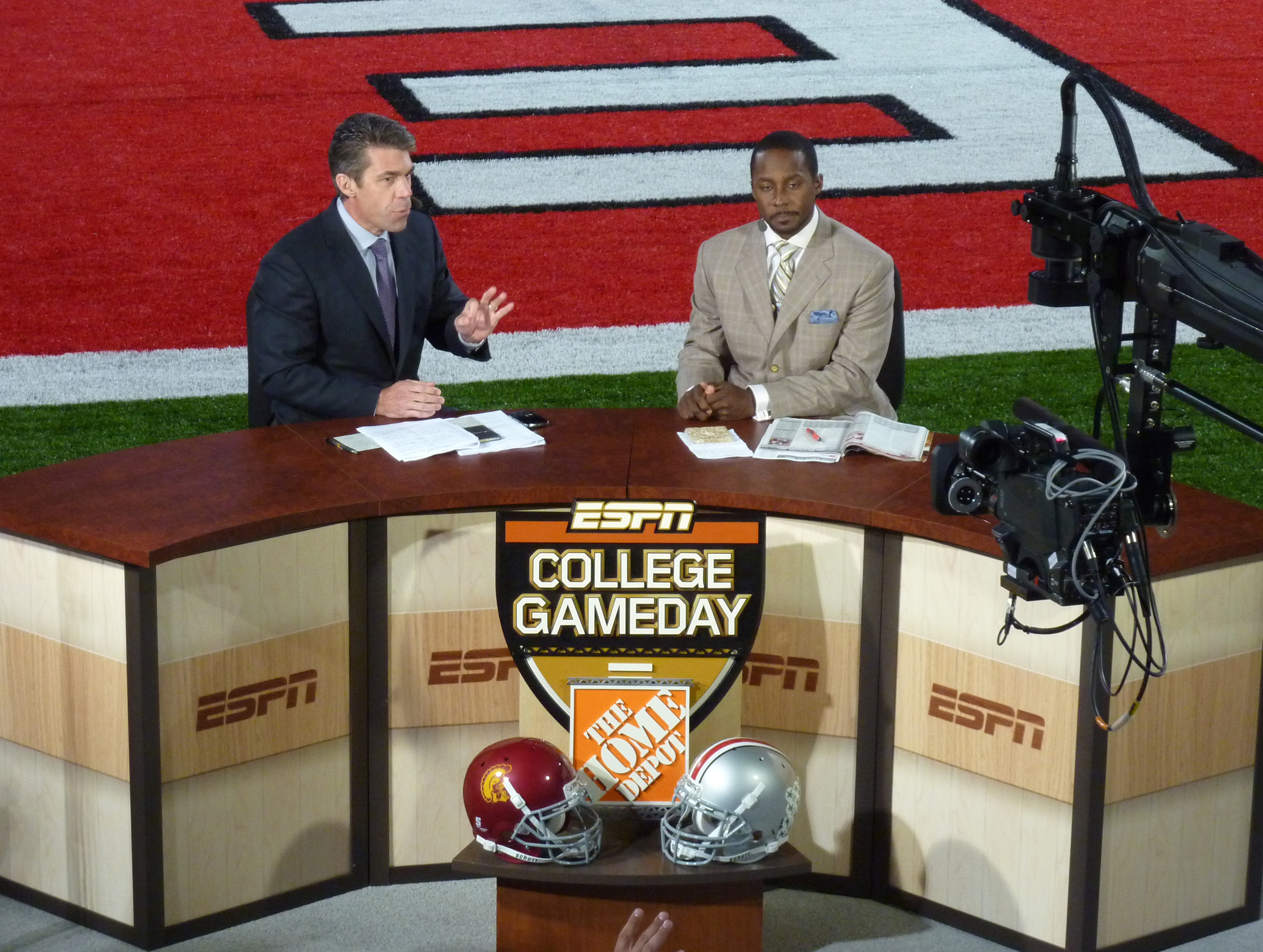
Chris Fowler and Desmond Howard conducting postgame coverage for College GameDay

Howard currently works for ESPN as a college football analyst. He appears as an in-studio personality and, in 2005, began traveling with Chris Fowler, Lee Corso, and Kirk Herbstreit to marquee matchup sites during the season for the pregame show ESPN College Gameday.

He was the color commentator for Detroit Lions pre-season games on the Detroit Lions Television Network for two years. He called games for the NFL on Fox for one season with former ESPN colleague Carter Blackburn.

== Personal life ==
Howard served as the cover athlete for the college football video game NCAA Football 06.

Howard practices meditation.

Howard is a supporting Scholar of University of Michigan through the Desmond and Rebkah Howard Scholarship Fund.

== See also ==
- Lists of Michigan Wolverines football receiving leaders
- List of NCAA major college football yearly receiving leaders
