= 1990 All-Big Ten Conference football team =

American college football all-star team

The 1990 All-Big Ten Conference football team consists of American football players chosen as All-Big Ten Conference players for the 1990 NCAA Division I-A football season.

== Offensive selections ==
=== Quarterbacks ===
- Matt Rodgers, Iowa (AP-1; Coaches-1)
- Greg Frey, Ohio State (Coaches-2)
- Jason Verduzco, Illinois (AP-2)

=== Running backs ===
- Jon Vaughn, Michigan (AP-1; Coaches-1)
- Nick Bell, Iowa (AP-2; Coaches-1)
- Tico Duckett, Michigan State (AP-1; Coaches-2)
- Howard Griffith, Illinois (Coaches-2)
- Vaughn Dunbar, Indiana (AP-2)

=== Receivers ===
- Richard Buchanan, Northwestern (AP-2; Coaches-1)
- Jeff Graham, Ohio State (AP-2; Coaches-1)
- Desmond Howard, Michigan (AP-1; Coaches-2)
- Shawn Wax, Illinois (AP-1; Coaches-2)

=== Tight ends ===
- Mike Titley, Iowa (AP-1; Coaches-2)
- Duane Young, Michigan State (AP-2; Coaches-1)

=== Centers ===
- Dan Beatty, Ohio State (Coaches-1) Tie
- Curt Lovelace, Illinois (AP-1)
- Chris Thome, Minnesota (Coaches-1) Tie
- Mike Devlin, Iowa (AP-2)

=== Guards ===
- Dean Dingman, Michigan (AP-1; Coaches-1)
- Eric Moten, Michigan State (AP-1; Coaches-1)
- Jason Cegielski, Purdue (AP-2; Coaches-2)
- Tim Simpson, Illinois (AP-2; Coaches-2)

=== Tackles ===
- Tom Dohring, Michigan (AP-2; Coaches-1)
- Greg Skrepenak, Michigan (AP-1; Coaches-1)
- Rob Baxley, Iowa (AP-2; Coaches-2)
- James Johnson, Michigan State (AP-1; Coaches-2)

== Defensive selections ==
=== Linemen ===
- Mel Agee, Illinois (AP-1; Coaches-1)
- Don Davey, Wisconsin (AP-1; Coaches-1)
- Moe Gardner, Illinois (AP-1; Coaches-1)
- Jim Johnson, Iowa (AP-1; Coaches-1)
- Matt Ruhland, Iowa (AP-1; Coaches-2)
- Carlos Jenkins, Michigan State (AP-2; Coaches-1)
- Dixon Edwards, Michigan State (Coaches-2)
- Alonzo Spellman, Ohio State (Coaches-2)
- Mike Sunvold, Minnesota (AP-2; Coaches-2)
- Bobby Wilson, Michigan State (AP-2; Coaches-2)
- Jeff Zgonina, Purdue (AP-2; Coaches-2)
- Mike Evans, Michigan (AP-2)

=== Linebackers ===
- Darrick Brownlow, Illinois (AP-1; Coaches-1)
- Melvin Foster, Iowa (AP-1; Coaches-1)
- Steve Tovar, Ohio State (AP-2; Coaches-1)
- Erick Anderson, Michigan (AP-1; Coaches-2)
- John Derby, Iowa (Coaches-2)
- Mark Hagen, Indiana (Coaches-2)
- Chuck Bullough, Michigan State (AP-2)
- Ed Sutter, Northwestern (AP-2)

=== Defensive backs ===
- Mike Dumas, Indiana (AP-1; Coaches-1)
- Merton Hanks, Iowa (AP-1; Coaches-1)
- Tripp Welborne, Michigan (AP-1; Coaches-1)
- Vinnie Clark, Ohio State (AP-2; Coaches-2)
- Steve Jackson, Purdue (Coaches-2)
- Henry Jones, Illinois (Coaches-2)
- Marlon Primous, Illinois (Coaches-2)
- Sean Lumpkin, Minnesota (AP-2)
- Troy Vincent, Wisconsin (AP-2)

== Special teams ==
=== Kickers ===
- J. D. Carlson, Michigan (AP-1)
- John Langeloh, Michigan State (AP-2; Coaches-1)
- Doug Higgins, Illinois (Coaches-2)

=== Punters ===
- Macky Smith, Indiana (AP-1; Coaches-1)
- Jeff Bohlman, Ohio State (AP-2; Coaches-2)

== Key ==
Bold = Consensus first-team selection by both the coaches and media

AP = Selected by the conference media

Coaches = Selected by the Big Ten Conference coaches

== See also ==
- 1990 College Football All-America Team
