= Troy Vincent =

American football player (born 1970)

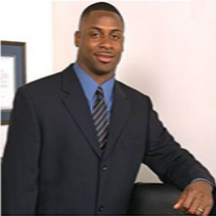
- Vincent in 2012

No. 23
- Positions: Cornerback, safety

Personal information
- Born: June 8, 1970 (age 56); Trenton, New Jersey, U.S.
- Listed height: 6 ft 1 in (1.85 m)
- Listed weight: 200 lb (91 kg)

Career information
- High school: Pennsbury (Fairless Hills, Pennsylvania)
- College: Wisconsin (1988–1991)
- NFL draft: 1992: 1st round, 7th overall pick

Career history
- Miami Dolphins (1992–1995); Philadelphia Eagles (1996–2003); Buffalo Bills (2004–2006); Washington Redskins (2006)

Awards and highlights
- Walter Payton NFL Man of the Year (2002); First-team All-Pro (2002); Second-team All-Pro (2001); 5× Pro Bowl (1999–2003); NFL interceptions co-leader (1999); PFWA All-Rookie Team (1992); Philadelphia Eagles Hall of Fame; Philadelphia Eagles 75th Anniversary Team; First-team All-American (1991); Big Ten Co-Defensive Player of the Year (1991); First-team All-Big Ten (1991); Second-team All-Big Ten (1990)

Career NFL statistics
- Tackles: 893
- Interceptions: 47
- Interception yards: 711
- Pass deflections: 102
- Forced fumbles: 12
- Fumble recoveries: 12
- Sacks: 5.5
- Defensive touchdowns: 3
- Stats at Pro Football Reference
- College Football Hall of Fame

Troy Darnell Vincent Sr. (born June 8, 1970) is an American sports executive and former professional football player who is the NFL's Executive Vice President of Football Operations. He played as a cornerback for 16 seasons for the Miami Dolphins, Philadelphia Eagles, Buffalo Bills and Washington Redskins of the National Football League (NFL). He played college football for the Wisconsin Badgers and was inducted into the College Football Hall of Fame in 2023. On September 28, 2011, Vincent was named as one of the preliminary nominees for the Pro Football Hall of Fame class of 2012 in his first year of eligibility and each year since.

He was previously inducted into the Sports Hall of Fame for the Philadelphia Eagles and was entered into the Hall of Fame for the State of Pennsylvania, the University of Wisconsin and Pennsbury High School. Vincent is a past recipient of the NFL's Walter Payton Man of the Year Award, one of the league's highest honors recognizing excellence on and off the field.

== Early life ==
Troy Vincent was born in Trenton, New Jersey. He spent his early childhood in east Trenton's Wilbur section, where he and his younger brother, Sam, were raised by their mother, Alma. His athletic interests at the time centered on basketball.

Alma moved the family to Bucks County, Pennsylvania, before Vincent's seventh-grade year. After a brief period in which Vincent returned to Trenton for his sophomore year, he returned to finish his secondary education at Pennsbury High School, where he was encouraged to try out for the football team and later starred for the Pennsbury Falcons. He also played recreationally with the Morrisville Little Bulldogs.

== College career and education ==
Vincent enrolled at the University of Wisconsin–Madison in 1988. He played cornerback for the Wisconsin Badgers and emerged as an All-American in 1991 under coach Barry Alvarez.

By the time he entered the NFL draft in 1992, Vincent had set Badgers' all-time records for passes defended in a season (13) and career (31). He finished his collegiate stint with 192 tackles, four interceptions and three punts returned for touchdowns, and was named team captain and MVP in his final season. He was inducted into the University of Wisconsin Athletics Hall of Fame in 2008 and the College Football Hall of Fame in 2023.

Vincent studied urban planning and development at the University of Wisconsin. He completed his studies at Thomas Edison State College in Trenton, graduating in 2007 with a bachelor's degree in liberal arts.

He also holds executive education and advanced business certificates from several institutions, including Harvard, Stanford and the University of Pennsylvania. In 2026, Franklin and Marshall College announced it would confer Vincent an honorary Doctor of Humane Letters for his leadership in football and philanthropy.

=== Career achievements ===
On November 22, 2017, Vincent was honored by the Big Ten Conference as the 2017 recipient of the Ford-Kinnick Leadership Award. The annual award recognizes Big Ten football student-athletes who have garnered significant success in leadership roles following their academic and athletic careers. He was inducted into the College Football Hall of Fame on December 5, 2023.

== Professional career ==
=== Pre-draft ===
Following his senior season, Vincent declared himself eligible for the 1992 NFL draft and was considered by the majority of analysts to be the top cornerback prospect. On January 19, 1992, Vincent participated in the East–West Shrine Bowl and was part of the East team that lost 14–6 to the West. He attended the NFL Scouting Combine and completed the majority of positional and combine drills. NFL draft analysts and scouts projected Vincent to be an early first round pick. ESPN draft analyst Mel Kiper Jr. had Vincent ranked as the top defensive back and the second best overall in the draft following defensive tackle Steve Emtman. Dr. Z of ‘’Sports Illustrated’’ had Vincent ranked as the top cornerback in the draft and projected him to be selected within the first five draft picks.

Pre-draft measurables
Height	Weight	Arm length	Hand span	40-yard dash	10-yard split	20-yard split	Vertical jump	Bench press
6 ft 0 1/4 in (1.84 m)	191 lb (87 kg)	32 7/8 in (0.84 m)	9 1/8 in (0.23 m)	4.45 s	1.58 s	2.61 s	35.5 in (0.90 m)	13 reps
All values from NFL Combine

=== Miami Dolphins ===
==== 1992 season ====
The Miami Dolphins selected Vincent in the first round (7th overall) of the 1992 NFL draft. He was the second cornerback drafted after Terrell Buckley (5th overall). The Green Bay Packers immediately received criticism from the media and fans for their decision to draft Terrell Buckley from Florida State instead of Vincent from Wisconsin. The Dolphins acquired the draft pick used to select Vincent in a trade with the Phoenix Cardinals for wide receiver Randal Hill. Since the common NFL draft was established in 1967, Vincent became the second highest draft pick in the history of the University of Wisconsin, following Paul Gruber in 1988 (4th overall). Vincent also surpassed Richard Johnson to become the highest drafted defensive player from Wisconsin.

(On Terrell Buckley drafted 5th overall)
"That's the way the ball bounces. He's going to Green Bay and I'm going to Miami. It's the greatest feeling in the world to see some sun, just to think about seeing some sun.'

— Troy Vincent

On August 8, 1992, the Dolphins signed Vincent to a four–year, $5.29 million rookie contract that included a signing bonus of $2.45 million.

He entered training camp slated as the No. 2 starting cornerback following the departure of Mike McGruder. Head coach Don Shula named J. B. Brown and Chris Green the starting cornerbacks to begin the season due to an injury to Vincent. He was inactive as the Dolphins had a 27–23 victory in their season-opener at the Cleveland Browns due to a hamstring injury he reaggravated during practice. The following week, Vincent made his professional regular season debut and recorded two solo tackles as the Dolphins defeated the Los Angeles Rams 26–10. Entering Week 3, defensive coordinator Tom Olivadotti promoted Vincent to the No. 2 starting cornerback, replacing Chris Green. On September 27, 1992, Vincent earned his first career start and made four solo tackles and two pass deflections during a 19–17 win at the Seattle Seahawks. In Week 5, he set a season-high with nine solo tackles and three pass deflections during a 27–10 win at the Buffalo Bills. On November 8, 1992, Vincent made two solo tackles, a pass deflection, and had the first interception of his career, picking off a pass Jeff George threw to wide receiver Jessie Hester during a 28–0 win at the Indianapolis Colts. He finished his rookie season with 60 combined tackles (58 solo), 12 pass deflections, and two interceptions in 15 games and 14 starts.

The Miami Dolphins finished first in the AFC East in the 1992 NFL season with a 11–5 record to clinch a first-round bye. On January 10, 1993, Vincent started in his first career playoff game in the AFC Divisional Round and recorded three solo tackles, led the team with five pass deflections, and intercepted two passes thrown by Stan Humphries during a 31–0 victory against the San Diego Chargers. On January 10, 1993, he started in the AFC Championship Game and recorded seven solo tackles as the Dolphins lost 29–10 to the Buffalo Bills.

==== 1993 season ====
He entered training camp slated as the de facto No. 1 starting cornerback. Head coach Don Shula named him and J. B. Brown the starting cornerbacks to begin the season. On September 5, 1993, Vincent started in the Miami Dolphins’ season-opener at the Indianapolis Colts and made two solo tackles, one pass deflection, and secured a 24–20 victory by intercepting a pass Jack Trudeau threw to Jessie Hester with 19 seconds remaining in the game. In Week 10, he set a season-high with seven combined tackles (four solo) during a 10–27 loss at the New York Jets. On November 25, 1993, Vincent recorded six combined tackles (five solo) and set a season-high with five pass deflections during a 16–14 win at the Dallas Cowboys. In Week 15, he recorded one solo tackle before exiting in the second quarter of a 20–21 loss against the Pittsburgh Steelers after sustaining an injury to his leg. On December 16, 1993, the Miami Dolphins placed Vincent on injured reserve for the remainder of the season (Weeks 16–18) due to slight tears he sustained to his ACL and MCL in his right knee. He finished the 1993 NFL season with 60 combined tackles (51 solo), 13 pass deflections, two interceptions, and a fumble recovery in 13 games and 13 starts. Pro Football Reference listed Vincent recorded 68 solo tackles.

==== 1994 season ====
On September 4, 1994, Vincent started in the Miami Dolphins’ home-opener against the New England Patriots and recorded three combined tackles (two solo), two pass deflections, and intercepted a pass by Drew Bledsoe as they won 35–39. Vincent injured his knee and was inactive for the next three games (Weeks 2–4). In Week 6, he set a season-high with seven combined tackles (six solo) and made one pass deflection during a 11–21 loss at the Buffalo Bills. On November 27, 1994, Vincent made four combined tackles (three solo), a pass deflection, and helped lead a fourth quarter comeback victory by intercepting a pass Boomer Esiason threw to wide receiver Rob Moore to start the fourth quarter as the Dolphins were losing 14–24. His interception led to a 28–yard touchdown pass from Dan Marino to Mark Ingram and the Dolphins would win 28–24 at the New York Jets. On December 12, 1994, Vincent recorded six combined tackles (four solo), made two pass deflections, one interception, and scored the first touchdown of his career as the Dolphins defeated the Kansas City Chiefs 28–45. His touchdown occurred in the third quarter, after free safety Gene Atkins intercepted a pass thrown by Steve Bono and lateralled the ball to Vincent for a 56–yard touchdown return. In Week 17, he recorded five solo tackles and set a season-high with four pass deflections during a 27–20 victory against the Detroit Lions. He finished the season with 52 combined tackles (41 solo), 17 pass deflections, five interceptions, and scored one touchdown in 13 games and 12 starts.

The Miami Dolphins finished atop the AFC East with a 10–6 record to clinch a playoff berth. On December 31, 1994, Vincent started in the AFC Wild-Card Game and recorded six combined tackles (four solo) and had a pass deflection as the Dolphins defeated the Kansas City Chiefs 27–17. The following week, the Dolphins were eliminated from the playoffs after losing 21–22 at the San Diego Chargers in the Divisional Round.

==== 1995 season ====
He returned as the No. 1 starting cornerback to start the regular season alongside J. B. Brown for the fourth consecutive season under defensive coordinator Tom Olivadotti. On September 3, 1995, Vincent started in the Miami Dolphins’ home-opener against the New York Jets and recorded one solo tackle, set a season-high with three pass deflections, set a season-high with two interceptions, and made the first pick-six of his career as the Dolphins routed the Jets 14–52. His first interception returned for a touchdown in his career occurred in the third quarter after he intercepted a pass by Boomer Esiason and returned it 69–yards for a touchdown. In Week 15, he set a season-high with seven solo tackles, had one pass break-up, and intercepted a pass Steve Bono threw to wide receiver Keith Cash as the Dolphins defeated the Kansas City Chiefs 6–13. He started in all 16 games throughout the 1995 NFL season for the first time in his career and recorded 62 combined tackles (52 solo), 12 pass deflections, five interceptions, and one touchdown.

The Miami Dolphins finished the season third in the AFC East with a 9–7 record, qualifying for a Wild-Card position. On December 30, 1995, Vincent started in the AFC Wild-Card Game and made one solo tackle, two pass deflections, and intercepted a pass Jim Kelly threw to wide receiver Bill Brooks during a 22–37 loss at the Buffalo Bills. On February 15, 1996, the Miami Dolphins exercised their transition tag on Vincent as a restricted free agent, giving them the opportunity to retain him if they matched or outbid any contract offers from any teams. The minimum salary Vincent would receive is $2.1 million per season which is the average salary of the top ten highest pair players at his position. The Dolphins would have seven days to match any proposed offers. On February 24, 1996, the Vincent signed an offer sheet from the Philadelphia Eagles for a five–year, $16.50 million contract. On March 1, 1996, the Dolphins requested a meeting with Vincent's agent and proposed to negotiate terms for a restructured five–year contract that would match the offer from the Eagles.

=== Philadelphia Eagles ===
==== 1996 season ====
On March 2, 1996, the Philadelphia Eagles signed Vincent to a five–year, $16.50 million contract as a transition free agent that included an initial signing bonus of $3.00 million. The Miami Dolphins had made a contract offer, but were unable to match the offer sheet made by Philadelphia. He entered training camp slated as the No. 1 starting cornerback following the departures of Mark McMillian and Derrick Frazier. Head coach Ray Rhodes named Vincent and Bobby Taylor the starting cornerbacks to begin the season.

In Week 3, he set a season-high with six solo tackles and three pass deflections as the Eagles defeated the Detroit Lions 24–17. On September 22, 1996, Vincent recorded six combined tackles (five solo), set a season-high with three pass deflections, and intercepted a pass Jeff George threw to Eric Metcalf during a 33–18 victory at the Atlanta Falcons. In Week 10, he set a season-high with six solo tackles and sealed a 31–21 victory at the Dallas Cowboys by scoring a touchdown to end the fourth quarter as they led 24–21. He tied the record for the longest interception in Eagles history against the Dallas Cowboys in 1996; after teammate James Willis intercepted Troy Aikman four yards into the end zone, he ran 14 yards before lateraling to Vincent, who returned the interception 90 yards for a 104-yard touchdown with 12 seconds remaining. He started in all 16 games throughout the 1996 NFL season and recorded 52 combined tackles (45 solo), 17 pass deflections, set a career-high with three forced fumbles, made three interceptions, and scored one touchdown.

==== 1997 season ====
Defensive coordinator Emmitt Thomas retained Vincent as the No. 1 starting cornerback to begin the season and paired him with Charles Dimry. In Week 2, he set a season-high with seven combined tackles (four solo) and made three pass deflections during a 10–9 win against the Green Bay Packers. On September 28, 1997, he set a season-high with six solo tackles, three pass deflections, and intercepted a pass Brad Johnson threw to wide receiver Cris Carter during a 19–28 loss at the Minnesota Vikings. He started in all 16 games for the third season in-a-row and recorded 65 combined tackles (50 solo), set a career-high with 24 pass deflections, made three interceptions, two fumble recoveries, and one forced fumble.

==== 1998 season ====
The Philadelphia Eagles selected cornerback Allen Rossum in the third round (85th overall) of the 1998 NFL draft. No. 2 starting cornerback Bobby Taylor sustained a shoulder injury and remained inactive for the first five games of the season (Weeks 1–5). Head coach Ray Rhodes named Vincent the No. 1 starting cornerback to begin the season and paired him with Al Harris. He was inactive for two games (Weeks 2–3) after he suffered an injury to his quadriceps. On November 2, 1998, Vincent set a season-high with seven solo tackles, made two pass deflections, and had the first sack of his career on Troy Aikman during a 34–0 loss to the Dallas Cowboys. He finished the 1998 NFL season with 50 combined tackles (42 solo), 13 pass deflections, two interceptions, and one sack in 13 games and 13 starts. On December 28, 1998, the Eagles fired head coach Ray Rhodes after they finished the season with a disappointing 3–13 record.

==== 1999 season ====
On January 11, 1999, the Philadelphia Eagles hired Andy Reid to be their new head coach.

On September 12, 1999, Vincent started in the Eagles' home-opener against the Arizona Cardinals and set a season-high with 14 combined tackles (13 solo) and made two pass deflections as they lost 24–25. In Week 4, he recorded 10 solo tackles, made one pass deflection, and intercepted a pass Kent Graham threw to wide receiver Joe Jurevicius during a 15–16 loss at the New York Giants. In Week 6, he made five combined tackles (three solo), a pass deflection, and intercepted Cade McNown's pass to Macey Brooks during a 20–16 victory at the Chicago Bears. This marked his third consecutive game with an interception. He was inactive for two games (Weeks 7–8) due to an injury to his quadriceps. On November 8, 1999, the Philadelphia Eagles signed Vincent to a three–year, $12.60 million contract extension. The new contract restructured the current and remaining seasons under his previous agreement and would keep under contract with the Eagles throughout the 2003 NFL season.

On December 19, 1999, Vincent recorded four combined tackles (three solo), set a season-high with five pass deflections, and set a season-high with two interceptions off passes thrown by Drew Bledsoe as the Eagles defeated the New England Patriots 9–24. He finished the season with 81 combined tackles (65 solo), 19 pass deflections, and set a new career-high with seven interceptions in 14 games and 14 starts. He was selected to the 2000 Pro Bowl, marking the first Pro Bowl selection of his career.

==== 2000 season ====
He returned to training camp slated as the de facto No. 1 starting cornerback under defensive coordinator Jim Johnson. He also played under defensive backs coach Leslie Frazier and assistant head coach Sean McDermott. Head coach Andy Reid named Vincent and Bobby Taylor as the starting cornerback duo to begin the season with Al Harris and Allen Rossum as their backups.

On September 24, 2000, Vincent recorded five solo tackles, set a season-high with four pass deflections, and intercepted two pass attempts by Jeff Blake during a 21–7 victory at the New Orleans Saints. He sealed their victory in Week 4 with an interception, picking off Jeff Blake’s pass attempt to wide receiver Willie Jackson with 1:06 remaining. In Week 6, he set a season-high with nine combined tackles (seven solo) and made two pass deflections during a 14–17 loss to the Washington Redskins. In Week 15, he recorded three solo tackles, two pass deflections, and intercepted a pass Doug Pederson threw to wide receiver David Patten during a 35–24 victory at the Cleveland Browns. The following week, he recorded four solo tackles, tied his season-high of four pass deflections, and forced a fumble as the Eagles defeated the Cincinnati Bengals 16–7 in Week 17. He started in all 16 games throughout the season and recorded 77 combined tackles (64 solo), 22 pass deflections, five interceptions, three forced fumbles, two fumble recoveries, and made one sack.

The Philadelphia Eagles finished the 2000 NFL season second in the NFC East with an 11–5 record to qualify for the playoffs. On December 31, 2000, Vincent recorded two combined tackles (one solo) and led the team with five pass deflections during a 21–3 win against the Tampa Bay Buccaneers in the NFC Wild-Card Game. On January 7, 2001, Vincent recorded eight combined tackles (six solo) and made one pass deflection during a 10–20 loss at the New York Giants in the Divisional Round.

==== 2001 season ====
He returned as the No. 1 starting cornerback to begin the season and remained alongside Bobby Taylor. In Week 4, he set a season-high with seven combined tackles (six solo), made one pass deflection, and forced a fumble during a 21–20 loss against the Arizona Cardinals. On December 9, 2001, Vincent recorded seven combined tackles (six solo), set a season-high with five pass deflections, and helped secure a 14–24 victory against the San Diego Chargers by intercepting a pass Doug Flutie threw to wide receiver Jeff Graham in the fourth quarter. Head coach Andy Reid opted to rest Vincent and the majority of the starting lineup in preparation for the playoffs during a 17–13 victory at the Tampa Bay Buccaneers in Week 17. He finished the season with 69 combined tackles (58 solo), three interceptions, 1.5 sacks, a forced fumble, and one fumble recovery in 15 games and 15 starts. He set a new career-high with 27 pass deflections and was selected to his third consecutive Pro Bowl in 2001.

The Philadelphia Eagles finished the 2001 NFL season atop the NFC East with an 11–5 record to clinch a playoff berth. On January 12, 2002, Vincent started in the NFC Wild-Card Game against the Tampa Bay Buccaneers and recorded six combined tackles (three solo), one pass deflection, and intercepted a pass Brad Johnson threw to wide receiver Jacquez Green as they won 9–31. The Eagles would defeat the Chicago Bears 33–19 in the NFC Divisional Round to advance in the playoffs. On January 27, 2002, Vincent started in the NFC Championship Game and recorded five combined tackles (three solo) as the Eagles lost 24–29 at the St. Louis Rams.

==== 2002 season ====
The Philadelphia Eagles selected cornerbacks Lito Sheppard in the first round (26th overall) and Sheldon Brown in the second round (59th overall) of the 2002 NFL draft. Head coach Andy Reid retained Vincent and Bobby Taylor as the starting cornerbacks for the fourth consecutive season under defensive coordinator Jim Johnson. On September 6, 2002, Vincent suffered a knee injury during practice and subsequently remained inactive as the Eagles lost 24–27 at the Tennessee Titans in Week 1. In Week 10, he set a season-high with nine combined tackles (seven solo) during a 35–13 loss against the Indianapolis Colts. On December 1, 2002, Vincent recorded seven combined tackles (six solo), set a season-high with three pass deflections, and intercepted a pass Kurt Warner threw to wide receiver Isaac Bruce as the Eagles defeated the St. Louis Rams 3–10. He finished the 2002 NFL season with 67 combined tackles (55 solo), 15 pass deflections, and two interceptions in 15 games and 15 starts. He was the recipient of the Walter Payton Man of the Year Award, the Byron "Whizzer" White NFL Man of the Year Award, and was selected for the Pro Bowl.

==== 2003 season ====
Head coach Andy Reid retained Vincent and Bobby Taylor as the starting cornerbacks to begin the season. He injured his hamstring and was sidelined during a 27–25 victory against the Washington Redskins in Week 5. On November 16, 2003, Vincent set a season-high with seven solo tackles and three pass deflections and also intercepted a pass Kerry Collins threw to wide receiver Amani Toomer as the Eagles defeated the New York Giants 10–28. He was inactive for the last two games of the season (Weeks 16–17) due to a painful hip flexor injury. He finished the 2003 NFL season with 57 combined tackles (49 solo), eight pass deflections, three interceptions, and a fumble recovery in 13 games and 13 starts. Although his stats were pedestrian in 2003, Vincent was still selected for his fifth consecutive Pro Bowl which would be the final selection of his career.

The Philadelphia Eagles finished first in the NFC East with a 12–4 record in 2003 and clinched a first-round bye. He remained inactive for the Divisional Round due to his hip injury as the Eagles defeated the Green Bay Packers 20–17. On January 18, 2004, Vincent started in the NFC Championship Game and recorded six combined tackles (three solo) and made one pass deflection as the Eagles lost 3–14 to the Carolina Panthers. The Philadelphia Eagles opted to not re-sign Vincent or Bobby Taylor as they entered free agency, planning to instead replace both with Lito Sheppard and Sheldon Brown. As an unrestricted free agent, Vincent drew interest from the Cincinnati Bengals, Kansas City Chiefs, and Buffalo Bills.

=== Buffalo Bills ===
==== 2004 season ====
On March 16, 2004, the Buffalo Bills signed Vincent to a six–year, $20.75 million contract that includes a signing bonus of $3.60 million following the departure of cornerback Antoine Winfield.

He entered training camp slated as the No. 1 starting cornerback under defensive coordinator Jerry Gray. Head coach Mike Mularkey named Vincent and Nate Clements the starting cornerbacks to begin the season. On September 12, 2004, Vincent started in the Buffalo Bills’ home-opener against the Jacksonville Jaguars and set a season-high with eight solo tackles as they lost 10–13. In Week 3, Vincent made one solo tackle and a pass deflection before he was carted off the field in the first quarter after injuring his knee while pushing wide receiver Bethel Johnson out-of-bounds during a 17–31 loss to the New England Patriots. He would undergo arthroscopic knee surgery and remained inactive for the next nine games (Weeks 5–13). Upon his return, he was named the starting free safety, replacing Rashad Baker as the Bills opted to retain Terrence McGee as a starting cornerback. On December 12, 2004, Vincent earned his first career start as a safety and recorded two combined tackles (one solo), made one pass deflection, one sack, and had his first and only interception of the season on a pass Luke McCown threw to tight end Aaron Shea during a 42–32 victory at the Miami Dolphins. In Week 17, he set a season-high with nine combined tackles (three solo) during a 24–29 loss to the Pittsburgh Steelers. He finished the 2004 NFL season with 27 combined tackles (18 solo), three pass deflections, one sack, a forced fumble, and one interception in seven games and seven starts. Following the season he received the Bart Starr Award.

==== 2005 season ====
He returned to training camp slated as the de facto starting free safety. Head coach Mike Mularkey named Vincent the starting free safety to begin the season and paired him with strong safety Lawyer Milloy. On September 11, 2005, Vincent started in the Buffalo Bills’ home-opener against the Houston Texans and made two pass deflections and set a season-high with two interceptions on pass attempts by David Carr as the Bills won 7–22. In Week 3, he set a season-high with 11 combined tackles (seven solo) during a 16–24 loss against the Atlanta Falcons. In Week 16, he made four tackles, one pass deflection, and intercepted a pass Carson Palmer threw to wide receiver Chad Johnson during a 37–27 victory at the Cincinnati Bengals. He started in all 16 games throughout the season and recorded 67 combined tackles (43 solo), eight pass deflections, four interceptions, two fumble recoveries, and one forced fumble.

==== 2006 season ====
Head coach Mike Mularkey named Vincent the starting free safety to begin the season and paired him with Coy Wire. On September 13, 2006, the Buffalo Bills placed Vincent on injured reserve due to a hamstring injury and he remained inactive for three games (Weeks 2–4). On October 13, 2006, the Buffalo Bills granted Vincent his release after he was cleared to return from injury.

=== Washington Redskins ===
On October 16, 2006, the Washington Redskins signed Vincent to a three–year, $3.93 million contract that included an initial signing bonus of $250,000. The Redskins' defense had struggled in the last few games with pass coverage resulting in the acquisition of Troy Vincent. Head coach Joe Gibbs chose to have Vincent initially begin as a backup for his first game.

Entering Week 9, head coach Joe Gibbs named Vincent the starting strong safety alongside free safety Sean Taylor, replacing Adam Archuleta. On November 5, 2006, Vincent set a season-high with six combined tackles (four solo) and blocked a crucial 35–yard game-winning field goal attempt by kicker Mike Vanderjagt with six seconds remaining in the game as the Redskins were tied 19–19 with the Dallas Cowboys. Vincent lined up on the left side of the offensive line with Carlos Rogers, blitzing untouched to block the field goal attempt which was recovered by Sean Taylor and returned 46–yards to put the kicker Nick Novak in field goal range following an additional 15–yard facemask penalty on the Cowboys. Novak would convert the 47–yard game-winning field goal with no time left to earn a last second 22–19 victory for the Redskins. The improbable win is known as the "Hand of God" game. He re-injured his hamstring and remained sidelined for two games (Weeks 12–13). Upon his return, he was demoted to being the backup strong safety behind Vernon Fox for the remainder of the season. He finished the 2006 NFL season with 22 combined tackles (14 solo) in nine games and four starts.

On February 22, 2007, the Washington Redskins officially released Vincent. The Redskins would go on to select strong safety LaRon Landry in the first round (6th overall) of the 2007 NFL draft following their decision to release Vincent.

== Career stats ==
Year	Team	Games	Combined tackles	Tackles	Assisted tackles	Sacks	Forced fumbles	Fumble recoveries	Fumble return yards	Interceptions	Interception return yards	Yards per interception return	Longest interception return	Interceptions returned for touchdown	Passes defended
1992	MIA	15	77	0	0	0.0	1	2	0	2	47	24	32	0	0
1993	MIA	13	59	50	9	0.0	0	1	0	2	29	15	23	0	14
1994	MIA	13	52	41	11	0.0	0	0	0	5	113	23	58	1	17
1995	MIA	16	62	52	10	0.0	0	0	0	5	95	19	69	1	12
1996	PHI	16	49	42	7	0.0	3	0	0	3	144	48	90	1	17
1997	PHI	16	64	49	15	0.0	1	1	0	3	14	5	14	0	24
1998	PHI	13	50	42	8	1.0	0	0	0	2	29	15	29	0	13
1999	PHI	14	79	60	19	1.0	2	0	0	7	91	13	35	0	17
2000	PHI	16	74	61	13	1.0	3	2	0	5	34	7	17	0	22
2001	PHI	15	67	56	11	1.5	1	1	0	3	0	0	0	0	27
2002	PHI	15	66	54	12	0.0	1	0	0	2	1	1	1	0	17
2003	PHI	13	57	49	8	0.0	0	1	0	3	28	9	28	0	8
2004	BUF	7	27	18	9	1.0	0	1	0	1	8	8	8	0	3
2005	BUF	16	66	42	24	0.0	1	2	0	4	78	20	42	0	8
2006	BUF	1	1	1	0	0.0	0	0	0	0	0	0	0	0	0
2006	WSH	8	21	13	8	0.0	0	0	0	0	0	0	0	0	0
Career		207	794	630	164	5.5	12	9	0	47	711	15	90	3	199

== NFL executive ==
=== Executive Vice President of Football Operations (2014–present) ===
Vincent was named the NFL's executive vice president of football operations in 2014, four years after joining the league office. His role includes oversight of game operations, officiating, on-field discipline, in-game analytics, personnel development and growth, policies and procedures related to NFL games, and other areas that affect the business of football. He also is involved in the league's inclusion initiatives, leading pipeline programs for coaches and front office executives of color.

As part of his role as the NFL's head of football operations, Vincent is a member of the American Football Coaches Association, an organization that represents coaches across the United States and is often consulted by the NCAA and the media regarding rule changes and developments occurring in college football, and serves as a non-voting member of the NFL's competition committee. In an October 24, 2017, feature article in The Root publication, Vincent discussed his role as "bridge-builder" in the ongoing debate about players taking a knee during the playing of the national anthem.

In the January 2018 issue of Monarch Magazine, Vincent talks about the "Game of Giving" and his commitment to American football. Vincent's leadership and impact on the game of football and social issues was detailed in Jarrett Bell's column in USA Today.

==== Flag Football Expansion and Advocacy ====
In 2022, Vincent and International Federation of American Football president Pierre Trochet were named co-chairs of Vision28, a group that lobbied for flag football's inclusion in the 2028 Olympic Games in Los Angeles. Their efforts led to the International Olympic Committee adding flag football to the LA Summer Games.

Vincent has also advocated for the expansion of flag football in the U.S., citing the demand created by a spike in participation among girls and young women. He has described flag as "football for all" due to the sport's greater accessibility for women, people with disabilities, and others to play in a non-contact format and earn opportunities such as college scholarships. Vincent has met with aspiring flag football players in high schools, introduced flag to U.S. colleges through a partnership with the National Association of Intercollegiate Athletics, and published op-eds arguing for states such as California, New York and Colorado to approve flag football as a varsity sport statewide.

In a 2025 TED talk, Vincent revealed that his oldest daughter played flag football, but was later denied access to the sport due to the lack of opportunities beyond late childhood. This, in part, motivated him to become an advocate for girls' flag.

==== Deflategate Involvement ====
After the 2014 AFC Championship Game, ESPN's Chris Mortensen reported that 11 of the Patriots' 12 game footballs were underinflated by at least two pounds each.

Mortensen's report later turned out to be false, and according to Mike Florio of Pro Football Talk, Mortensen got his false info from NFL executive vice president of football operations Troy Vincent. Florio noted that it's "unclear" whether Vincent "deliberately lied" to Mortensen, however, Vincent was the one who handed out the initial four-game suspension to Brady in May 2015, suggesting a conflict of interest behind NFL walls as it investigated Brady.

=== Sr. Vice President of Player Engagement (2010–2014) ===
Vincent joined the NFL's league office in February 2010 as vice president of player development, leading support programs for players and their families, such as the Rookie Symposium and life skills initiatives. He was promoted to senior vice president of player engagement in 2013.

During his tenure as head of development and engagement, Vincent expanded the league's services, helping to launch programs such as NFL Total Wellness for current and former players. Vincent also started the peer-to-peer NFL Legends community and has been credited with recruiting hundreds of former NFL players as ambassadors for the league's various support initiatives.

Vincent estimated that monthly participation increased from "probably 200, 300 players" when he joined the NFL office to around 20,000 active and retired players by 2014.

== NFLPA career ==
Vincent was president of the NFL Players Association from March 29, 2004, until March 18, 2008. He was replaced by Kevin Mawae. During his time with the Players Association, Vincent helped negotiate and implement three collective bargaining agreement extensions.

On February 26, 2009, the Players Association announced they were investigating whether during his tenure as president Vincent disclosed confidential personal and financial information about a number of player agents. It is alleged Vincent emailed this information to his longtime business partner Mark Magnum for the benefit of a financial services firm co-owned by the two men. However, the Associated Press uncovered no evidence to support the contention that Vincent, by forwarding an NFLPA e-mail to his business partner, used agents' personal information to build his financial services company.

=== NFL Business Management and Entrepreneurial Program ===
While playing for the Buffalo Bills, Vincent approached the Wharton School with an idea to create educational programs to help fellow players prepare for life after football. This led to the formation of the NFL Business Management and Entrepreneurial Program led by Vincent and former NFLPA executive director Gene Upshaw. Jason Wingard of the New York Daily News spoke to Vincent's vision and the need for those entering the NFL to prepare for retirement from football.

== Community involvement and philanthropic efforts ==
Vincent has served on numerous boards over his career and served on the board of directors for the University of Wisconsin Foundation, and the State of New Jersey After 3 Program. He became the first active NFL player to serve on the National Board of Directors for Pop Warner Little Scholars Football.

As a player, Vincent was recognized for his humanitarian work with the NFL's Walter Payton Man of the Year Award. He was inducted into Sport for Impact's Walter Payton Man of the Year Ring of Honor in 2025. Impact Magazine awarded Vincent for his ongoing advocacy and community work the same year.

=== Domestic violence and sexual assault awareness ===
A national advocate for victims of domestic violence and sexual assault, Vincent shared his family's own story of experiencing domestic violence in a February 19, 2017, guest editorial in the Naples Daily News prior to his February 20 keynote address at The Naples Shelter for Abused Women and Children's annual event. In multiple forums, Vincent has advocated for an end to domestic violence. He has also challenged men to "stand beside women as leaders in the fight against domestic violence and sexual assault."

In 2023, Troy Vincent and his wife Tommi Vincent, chair of the National Domestic Violence Hotline, launched the Vincent Commission in partnership with Niagara University to study and address gender-based violence. Vincent has been honored by organizations such as Womanspace, Women Against Abuse and the Joe Torre Safe at Home Foundation for his work to advance domestic violence awareness.

=== Love Thy Neighbor ===
Vincent and his family founded the Love Thy Neighbor Community Development and Opportunity Corporation, a not-for-profit organization dedicated to fostering positive change in young people's lives through character, athletics and academics. Since its founding in Trenton, N.J., in the 1990s, Love Thy Neighbor has provided college scholarships and mentoring programs for high school students, and school supplies for elementary students in inner cities, among other initiatives.

Each year ahead of the Super Bowl, Love Thy Neighbor holds a virtual fundraiser and the "Vincent Country Safe Zone Activity Day" for students at an under-resourced elementary school in the game's host city.

The seventh annual activity day in 2024, held at Matt Kelly Elementary School in Las Vegas, Nevada, included sports, games, food and resources. Students received free eye exams and glasses, health screenings, and haircuts provided by former NFL star Steven Jackson, co-founder of the Original Barber School in Las Vegas. In 2025, Love Thy Neighbor donated more than $150,000 worth of wish-list items to teachers and students, in addition to free health and vision screenings, at Garyville/Mt. Airy Math and Science Magnet School in the New Orleans area. The organization most recently supported Burckhalter Elementary School in Oakland, California, which received a soccer turf field, a community mural, a fully stocked on-site food pantry, among other items. According to the organization, Safe Zone has served 5,010 students and 679 school personnel, and has donated $1.2 million in school equipment, in seven states to date.

Vincent, through Love Thy Neighbor, donated a hydroponic GroShed to Trenton's historic Chestnut Avenue Three Point Garden in June 2025. The facility will help produce seedlings for 50-plus community gardens serving 250 families in the region.

=== Other community involvement ===
The Vincent family donated funds to help restore a park in Trenton, N.J., where Troy Vincent played basketball growing up. The city later renamed the park in memory of his grandfather, Jefferson Vincent.

In 2011, Vincent returned to another one of the communities he grew up in; the Pennsbury School District in Bucks County, Pennsylvania. His visit was in support of the Fuel Up To Play 60 program at Edgewood Elementary School. During this visit, Vincent spent time with the students, teachers, and parents.

Vincent, whose grandfather served as an infantryman in World War II, has also been an outspoken supporter of veterans, promoting the leadership qualities they bring to football, the military academies, and civilian life.

== Personal life ==
Vincent and his wife Tommi, a published author and chef and cousin to drag racer Antron Brown, have five children – three sons and two daughters. Their son Taron Vincent is a defensive tackle who played college football at Ohio State and signed with the Los Angeles Rams in 2023. The couple has been profiled in Impact Magazine, Black Love, the New York Times, and other publications for their approach to family life, as well as their philanthropy and advocacy work.

Vincent is a Christian.
