= Sean Lumpkin =

American football player (born 1970)

No. 46
- Position: Safety

Personal information
- Born: January 4, 1970 (age 56); Golden Valley, Minnesota, U.S.
- Listed height: 6 ft 0 in (1.83 m)
- Listed weight: 206 lb (93 kg)

Career information
- High school: St. Louis Park (MN) Benilde-St. Margaret's
- College: Minnesota
- NFL draft: 1992: 4th round, 106th overall pick

Career history
- New Orleans Saints (1992–1996)

Awards and highlights
- Third-team All-American (1991); First-team All-Big Ten (1991); Second-team All-Big Ten (1990)

Career NFL statistics
- Tackles: 219
- Interceptions: 2
- Forced fumbles: 7
- Stats at Pro Football Reference

Sean Franklin Lumpkin (born January 4, 1970) is an American former professional football player who was a safety for the New Orleans Saints of the National Football League (NFL). He played college football for four years with the Minnesota Gophers, accruing numerous awards:

- 1990: All Big Ten Second team
- 1991: All Big-Ten First-team, Bronko Nagurski Award (Team MVP), Carl Eller Award (Outstanding Defensive Player), Captain

Lumpkin was selected by New Orleans in the fourth round of the 1992 NFL draft with the 106th overall pick, and he played 67 games for the Saints between 1992 and 1996. He was released by the Saints in June 1997.

Lumpkin grew up in Golden Valley, Minnesota, and graduated from Benilde-St. Margaret's School where he is one of a handful of notable alumni.
