= Mike Evans (defensive lineman) =

American football player (born 1967)

No. 94, 97
- Position: Defensive end

Personal information
- Born: June 2, 1967 (age 59); St. Croix, Virgin Islands
- Listed height: 6 ft 3 in (1.91 m)
- Listed weight: 269 lb (122 kg)

Career information
- High school: Cushing Academy (Ashburnham, Massachusetts, U.S.)
- College: Michigan
- NFL draft: 1992: 4th round, 111th overall pick

Career history
- Kansas City Chiefs (1992); Green Bay Packers (1994)*; Amsterdam Admirals (1995-1997)
- * Offseason or practice squad member only

Awards and highlights
- First-team All-Big Ten (1991); Second-team All-Big Ten (1990)
- Stats at Pro Football Reference

Michael James Evans (born June 2, 1967) is a former American football defensive end for the Kansas City Chiefs of the National Football League (NFL). He played college football at the University of Michigan.

== Early life ==
Evans attended Cushing Academy and played high school football as a linebacker. He spent a year at a prep school to improve his grades.

He walked-on at the University of Michigan, before receiving a scholarship. He was converted from an inside linebacker into a defensive tackle as a freshman. He became a starter as a sophomore. In his junior season he posted 46 tackles (third on the team) and 7 sacks (led the team). In his last year he received All-Big Ten honors.

== Professional career ==
Pre-draft measurables
Height	Weight	Arm length	Hand span	40-yard dash	10-yard split	20-yard split	20-yard shuttle	Vertical jump	Broad jump	Bench press
6 ft 3 3/8 in (1.91 m)	266 lb (121 kg)	33 1/2 in (0.85 m)	9 3/8 in (0.24 m)	5.16 s	1.83 s	2.99 s	4.66 s	30.0 in (0.76 m)	9 ft 4 in (2.84 m)	21 reps

=== Kansas City Chiefs ===
Evans was selected by the Kansas City Chiefs in the fourth round (101st overall) of the 1992 NFL draft. As a rookie, he appeared in 12 games (one start), registering 5 tackles and 4 quarterback pressures. He was waived on August 24, 1993.

=== Green Bay Packers ===
On March 2, 1994, he was signed as a free agent by the Green Bay Packers. He was released on August 23.
