= Carlos James (American football) =

American football player (born 1972)

Profile
- Position: Wide receiver / Defensive back

Personal information
- Born: February 5, 1972 (age 54)
- Listed height: 6 ft 0 in (1.83 m)
- Listed weight: 180 lb (82 kg)

Career information
- High school: Rich East (Park Forest, Illinois)
- College: Iowa
- NFL draft: 1993: undrafted

Career history
- Iowa Barnstormers (1995–2000); Buffalo Destroyers (2001–2002); New York Dragons (2003); Tampa Bay Storm (2003–2004)

Awards and highlights
- 2× First-team All-Arena (1999, 2000); 2× Second-team All-Arena (1997, 1998); 2× All-Ironman Team (1998, 2000); First-team All-Big Ten (1992)

Career AFL statistics
- Receptions: 279
- Receiving yards: 3,472
- Receiving TDs: 75
- Tackles: 462.5
- Interceptions: 37
- Stats at ArenaFan.com

Carlos "the Assassin" James (born February 5, 1972) is an American former professional football player who played ten seasons in the Arena Football League (AFL) with the Iowa Barnstormers, Buffalo Destroyers, New York Dragons and Tampa Bay Storm. He played college football at the University of Iowa.

== Early life ==
James played high school football at Rich East High School in Park Forest, Illinois, as a receiver and defensive back. He intercepted 18 passes in his career and earned Tribune All-State honors.

== College career ==
James played for the Iowa Hawkeyes. He was named Co-Defensive MVP of the 1991 Holiday Bowl after intercepting a pass by Ty Detmer at the goal line in the final seconds to preserve a 13–13 tie with the BYU Cougars. Carlos garnered First Team All-Big Ten recognition his senior season in 1992.

== Professional career ==
James played for the Iowa Barnstormers of the AFL from 1995 to 2000, earning first-team All-Arena, second-team All-Arena and All-Ironman Team honors twice each. He signed with the AFL's Buffalo Destroyers on January 12, 2001. He was signed by the New York Dragons of the AFL on March 6, 2003. James signed with the Tampa Bay Storm of the AFL on November 18, 2003.
