= Tim Simpson (American football) =

American football player and coach (born 1969)

No. 61, 65
- Positions: Guard, center

Personal information
- Born: March 5, 1969 (age 57); Peoria, Illinois, U.S.
- Listed height: 6 ft 2 in (1.88 m)
- Listed weight: 284 lb (129 kg)

Career information
- High school: East Peoria (East Peoria, Illinois)
- College: Illinois
- NFL draft: 1992: 12th round, 329th overall pick

Career history

Playing
- Cleveland Browns (1992)*; Pittsburgh Steelers (1993–1994); New York Jets (1996)*; London Monarchs (1996); Peoria Pirates (2000–2002); Bloomington Edge (2013)*
- * Offseason or practice squad member only

Coaching
- Bloomington Extreme (2008)

Awards and highlights
- ArenaCup champion (2002); First-team All-American (1991); First-team All-Big Ten (1991); Second-team All-Big Ten (1990)

Career NFL statistics
- Games played: 4
- Stats at Pro Football Reference

Timothy James Simpson (born March 5, 1969) is an American former professional football player who was an offensive guard for one season with the Pittsburgh Steelers of the National Football League (NFL). He played college football for the Illinois Fighting Illini and was selected by the Cleveland Browns in the twelfth round of the 1992 NFL draft. Simpson was also a member of the New York Jets, London Monarchs, Peoria Pirates and Bloomington Edge.

== Early life ==
Simpson played high school football at East Peoria High School in East Peoria, Illinois. He was a four-year starter for the Red Raiders as well as a two-time All-Conference and All-State selection. He also participated in wrestling, compiling a record of 157–4, including 3rd and 4th place IHSA state finishes. Simpson was inducted the Greater Peoria Sports Hall of Fame in 2006.

== College career ==
At the University of Illinois Urbana-Champaign, Simpson played for the Fighting Illini from 1988 to 1991, starting all 48 games of his career. He earned first-team American Football Coaches All-America honors his senior year in 1991 and was co-winner of the Illini Male Athlete of the Year award, also known as the Dike Eddleman Athlete-of-the-Year, in 1992. He was also a two-time All-Big Ten selection.

== Professional career ==
Simpson was selected by the Cleveland Browns with the 329th pick in the 1992 NFL draft. He played in four games for the Pittsburgh Steelers in 1994.

He then signed with the New York Jets. In February 1996, he was allocated to the World League of American Football to play for the London Monarchs. He was released by the Jets in August 1996.

Simpson played for the Peoria Pirates from 2000 to 2002, winning ArenaCup III in 2002. He retired after the 2002 season.

He signed with the Bloomington Edge of the Champions Professional Indoor Football League in 2013 but retired before the start of the season.

== Coaching career ==
Simpson helped coach offensive and defensive line at his former high school in 2006, and later was offensive line coach of the Bloomington Extreme of United Indoor Football in 2008.
