= Mark Bounds =

American football punter

Profile
- Position: Punter

Career information
- College: West Texas State (1990); Texas Tech (1991)

Awards and highlights
- Unanimous All-American (1991); First-team All-SWC (1991)

Mark Bounds is an American former football punter. He played at the collegiate level for Texas Tech, where he earned unanimous All-American honors in 1991.

== Career ==
Bounds began his career at NCAA Division II West Texas State (now West Texas A&M University) where he earned All-American honors in 1990. He led Division II punters with a 46.3 yard average. Bounds transferred to Texas Tech University in the following year following the cessation of West Texas State's football program.

Following the 1991 season, Bounds led NCAA Division I in punting average with 48.6 yards per punt. For his performance, Bounds was selected as a unanimous All-American by the 5 organizations recognized for the purpose by the NCAA, one of only five Red Raiders to do so. His selection also marked him as one of only two players that had ever been named an AFCA All-American at two different schools. He was also noted for his superstitions, such as wearing orange shoes with green shoelaces when punting.

Following his college career, Bounds briefly signed with the Chicago Bears before being cut following an injury.

== Legal issues ==
In 2005, Bounds was alleged to have participated in a so-called conspiracy to overcharge Texas Tech for dietary supplements provided to Texas Tech athletes. Bounds owned Muscle Tech, a nutritional supplement store in Lubbock, Texas. Bounds allegedly conspired with Aaron Shelley, Texas Tech's former director of sports nutrition. Bounds agreed to accept five years of probation and pay restitution, instead of presenting his unquestioned defense, to simply and efficiently move on from the unproven allegations
