= Matt Rodgers =

American college football player (born 1969)

No. 7
- Position: Quarterback

Career information
- High school: Walpole (Walpole, Massachusetts)
- College: Iowa (1988–1991)

Awards and highlights
- Big Ten Co-Offensive Player of the Year (1990); First-team All-Big Ten (1990); Second-team All-Big Ten (1991)

Matt Rodgers (born January 8, 1969) is an American former college football player who was a quarterback for the Iowa Hawkeyes from 1988 to 1991. He won the Big Ten Offensive Player of the Year award in 1990.

== Early life and education ==
Rodgers was a three-sport star at Walpole High School in Massachusetts. His father, Jimmy Rodgers, later became the head coach of the Boston Celtics and Minnesota Timberwolves. Jimmy Rodgers was named the MVP of the Iowa Hawkeyes men's basketball team in 1964 and 1965. Rodgers took a recruiting trip to Iowa at his father’s request, and he wound up committing to Coach Hayden Fry and the Hawkeyes.

== Career ==
Rodgers’ career at Iowa got off to a rocky start. His only pass as a freshman in 1988 was intercepted on a fake field goal, and in 1989 the Hawkeyes missed a bowl game for the first time in nine years. As a junior in 1990, Rodgers threw for 2,228 yards and 15 touchdowns while running for nine more touchdowns. He helped lead Iowa to the Big Ten title and a berth in the 1991 Rose Bowl. Rodgers was named the Big Ten Offensive Player of the Year along with his teammate, Nick Bell. In the Rose Bowl, Rodgers threw for a touchdown and ran for two more touchdowns in a 46-34 loss to Washington.

In 1991, Rodgers was the first team All-Big Ten quarterback for the second straight year. Despite missing two games with a knee injury, he threw for 2,275 yards and 14 touchdowns. Rodgers helped lead Iowa to a 10-1-1 record in his senior season, and Iowa finished the year in the top ten in the final national rankings.

He was drafted by the Buffalo Bills in the 12th round of the 1992 NFL draft.
