= Rob Baxley =

American football player (born 1969)

No. 70, 62
- Position: Offensive tackle

Personal information
- Born: March 14, 1969 (age 57); Oswego, Illinois, U.S.
- Listed height: 6 ft 5 in (1.96 m)
- Listed weight: 285 lb (129 kg)

Career information
- High school: Oswego
- College: Iowa
- NFL draft: 1992: 11th round, 286th overall pick

Career history
- Phoenix Cardinals (1992–1993); Amsterdam Admirals (1995); Tampa Bay Buccaneers (1995)*
- * Offseason or practice squad member only

Awards and highlights
- 2× Second-team All-Big Ten (1990, 1991)

Career NFL statistics
- Games played: 6
- Stats at Pro Football Reference

Robert R. Baxley (born March 14, 1969) is an American former professional football player who was an offensive tackle who played one season with the Phoenix Cardinals of the National Football League (NFL). He was selected by the Phoenix Cardinals in the 11th round of the 1992 NFL draft. He played college football for the Iowa Hawkeyes. Baxley was also a member of the Amsterdam Admirals and Tampa Bay Buccaneers.

== Early life ==
Baxley attended Oswego High School in Oswego, Illinois.

== College career ==
Baxley played college football for the Iowa Hawkeyes, starting three seasons at right tackle. He earned All-Big Ten and honorable mention All-American honors his senior year.

== Professional career ==
Baxley was selected by the Phoenix Cardinals with the 286th pick in the 1992 NFL Draft. He was a member of the Cardinals from 1992 to 1993, playing in six games for the team in 1992. He spent the 1993 season on the injured reserve list.

Baxley was selected by the Amsterdam Admirals of the World League of American Football in the twelfth round of the 1995 WLAF Draft and played for them during the 1995 season.

Baxley signed a one-year contract with the Tampa Bay Buccaneers on June 23, 1995. He was released by the Buccaneers on August 21, 1995.
