= Leroy Smith (American football) =

American football player (born 1969)

No. 8
- Position: Defensive end

Personal information
- Born: January 6, 1969 (age 57)

Career information
- College: Iowa (1988–1991)

Awards and highlights
- Consensus All-American (1991); Big Ten Co-Defensive Player of the Year (1991); Big Ten Defensive Lineman of the Year (1991); First-team All-Big Ten (1991)

Leroy Smith (born January 6, 1969) is an American former college football defensive end who played for the Iowa Hawkeyes from 1988 to 1991. He was named a consensus All-American and the Big Ten Defensive Player of the Year in 1991.

== Playing career ==
Smith arrived at the University of Iowa from Sicklerville, New Jersey. He played running back in high school but moved to the defensive end position in college, because the Hawkeyes already had a stockpile of good running backs. As a junior in 1990, Smith played on Iowa's Big Ten championship team that went to the Rose Bowl.

Smith had perhaps the most dominating senior season a Hawkeye defensive end has ever had. His signature game came against Ohio State in 1991. He recorded 14 tackles, including a school-record five quarterback sacks, in Iowa's 16–9 victory. Smith had 18 sacks on the season, which broke a Big Ten record that had stood for 14 years.

In 1995 he joined Rhein Fire, a German team that played in the World League of American Football.

== Honors ==
Leroy Smith was named a consensus first team All-American in 1991, as he helped lead Iowa to a 10–1–1 record and a top ten finish in the national rankings. He was also named both the Big Ten Defensive Lineman of the Year and the Big Ten Defensive Player of the Year.
