= Ty Detmer =

American football player and coach (born 1967)

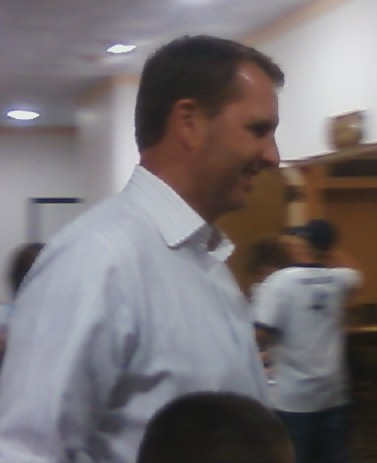
- Detmer in 2009

No. 11, 14
- Position: Quarterback

Personal information
- Born: October 30, 1967 (age 59); San Marcos, Texas, U.S.
- Listed height: 6 ft 0 in (1.83 m)
- Listed weight: 189 lb (86 kg)

Career information
- High school: Southwest (San Antonio, Texas)
- College: BYU (1987–1991)
- NFL draft: 1992: 9th round, 230th overall pick

Career history

Playing
- Green Bay Packers (1992–1995); Philadelphia Eagles (1996–1997); San Francisco 49ers (1998); Cleveland Browns (1999–2000); Detroit Lions (2001–2003); Atlanta Falcons (2004–2005)

Coaching
- St. Andrew's Episcopal (TX) (2009–2015) Head coach; BYU (2016–2017) Offensive coordinator & quarterbacks coach; American Leadership–Gilbert North (2021–present) Head coach

Awards and highlights
- Heisman Trophy (1990); 2× Consensus All-American (1990, 1991); 2× NCAA passing yards leader (1990, 1991); BYU Cougars No. 14 retired

Career NFL statistics
- Passing attempts: 946
- Passing completions: 546
- Completion percentage: 57.7%
- TD–INT: 34–35
- Passing yards: 6,351
- Passer rating: 74.7
- Stats at Pro Football Reference
- College Football Hall of Fame

Ty Hubert Detmer (born October 30, 1967) is an American former professional football player who was a quarterback in the National Football League (NFL). He won the Heisman Trophy, Maxwell Award, and Davey O'Brien Award in 1990 while playing college football for the BYU Cougars. Detmer broke numerous National Collegiate Athletic Association (NCAA) records with BYU and was twice recognized as a consensus All-American. A late-round pick in the 1992 NFL draft, Detmer played for six NFL teams over 14 seasons, mostly in a backup role. In 2012 Detmer was inducted into the College Football Hall of Fame.

After his playing career, Detmer became a coach and an athletic administrator. He was the offensive coordinator at BYU from 2015 to 2017. He is currently the athletic director at American Leadership Academy – Gilbert North High School in Gilbert, Arizona.

== Early life ==
Detmer was born in San Marcos, Texas. He attended Hobby Middle School, Mount Sacred Heart Middle School, and United Middle School in Laredo, Texas, and Southwest High School in San Antonio, Texas. He earned letters in golf, football, basketball, baseball, and track. As a senior, Detmer won high school All-American honors in football and was the Texas Player of the Year. He also won all-state honors in baseball and all-district accolades in basketball.

== College career ==
Detmer attended Brigham Young University, where he played football for the Cougars from 1987 to 1991. In deciding which college to attend, he was in part attracted by BYU's alcohol-free environment. He redshirted for the Cougars during the 1987 season, and shared quarterback duties with Sean Covey as a redshirt freshman in 1988. Detmer started only one game that year, but he made the most of the opportunity, passing for 333 yards and five touchdowns in a 65–0 victory over New Mexico. Later, he was named Most Valuable Player of the 1988 Freedom Bowl, after entering the game as a substitute and leading BYU to a come-from-behind 20–17 victory over the Colorado Buffaloes.

Detmer became the full-time starter in 1989. He emerged as one of the top quarterbacks in the nation, passing for 4,560 yards and 32 touchdowns during the regular season. His passer rating of 175.6 led the NCAA, and he finished second to Houston's Andre Ware in total offense. He led BYU to a Western Athletic Conference (WAC) Championship, the team's first since 1985. Detmer finished the season with a strong performance against Penn State in the 1989 Holiday Bowl, setting NCAA records for most passing yards (576) and most yards of total offense (594) in a single bowl game. He finished ninth in the Heisman Trophy voting.

Detmer's 1990 junior season ranks as one of the greatest seasons for a quarterback in college football history. He passed for 5,188 yards and 41 touchdowns in 12 regular-season games and finished the year with 42 NCAA records (and tied for five others). The high point of the season was BYU's 28–21 upset victory over the top-ranked Miami Hurricanes; Detmer led the Cougars by passing for 406 yards and three touchdowns against the defending national champions. For his performance that season, he was awarded the Heisman Trophy, as well as many other honors including the Maxwell and Davey O'Brien awards. He was recognized as a consensus first-team All-American, having been named to the first teams of the Associated Press, UPI, Newspaper Enterprise Association, Football Writers Association of America, Walter Camp Foundation, Football News, Scripps Howard, and the Sporting News. Unfortunately for Detmer and BYU, the season ended in disastrous fashion: the Cougars lost 59–28 in their final regular-season game against Hawaii on the back of four Detmer interceptions, then lost 65–14 to Texas A&M in the 1990 Holiday Bowl. Detmer was knocked out of the game against Texas A&M, suffering two separated shoulders that required off-season surgery.

The 1991 season started poorly for BYU, as the Cougars lost their first three games (on a neutral field against #1 Florida State and road contests against #23 UCLA and #12 Penn State). After the 0–3 start, Detmer and BYU turned things around. The Cougars won eight straight games and clinched their third consecutive WAC championship with a 52–52 tie against San Diego State in their final regular-season road game. In that contest, BYU fell behind 45–17 before Detmer led a comeback. He finished the game with 599 passing yards and six touchdowns, both career highs. In his final game as a Cougar, Detmer passed for 350 yards to lead BYU to a 13–13 tie against heavily favored #7 Iowa in the 1991 Holiday Bowl. He totaled 4,031 passing yards and 35 touchdowns in regular season play during his senior year. He finished third in the Heisman Trophy voting but won the Davey O'Brien Award again and also earned the Sammy Baugh Trophy and Today's Top VI Award. Additionally, he was again recognized as a consensus first-team All-American.

Detmer finished his college career with the following totals: 1,530 pass attempts; 958 completions; 15,031 passing yards; 121 touchdown passes; 14,665 yards of total offense; 135 touchdowns responsible for; and 162.7 passer rating—all NCAA records at the time. In total, he finished his college career with 59 NCAA records and tied for three others. Including statistics from bowl games, Detmer amassed 16,206 passing yards and 127 touchdown passes at BYU. He graduated with a bachelor's degree in recreation administration. In 2012, Detmer was inducted into the College Football Hall of Fame.

=== Awards and honors ===
- Heisman Trophy (1990)
- Maxwell Award (1990)
- 2× Davey O'Brien Award (1990, 1991)
- Sammy Baugh Trophy (1991)
- UPI Player of the Year (1990)
- 2× Consensus All-American (1990, 1991)
- 2× NCAA passing yards leader (1990, 1991)
- 2× WAC Offensive Player of the Year (1990, 1991)
- 2× First-team All-WAC (1989, 1990)
- BYU Cougars No. 14 retired

== Professional career ==
Pre-draft measurables
| Height | Weight | Arm length | Hand span |
|---|---|---|---|
| 5 ft 11 3/4 in (1.82 m) | 179 lb (81 kg) | 31 3/4 in (0.81 m) | 8 1/8 in (0.21 m) |

=== Green Bay Packers ===
Despite his success at BYU, many analysts thought that Detmer was too small to play quarterback in the NFL. The Green Bay Packers drafted him in the ninth round (230th pick overall) of the 1992 NFL draft. Detmer spent four seasons with the Packers, but appeared in only seven games while serving as back-up to starter Brett Favre.

=== Philadelphia Eagles ===
Detmer found more playing time after signing a free-agent contract with the Philadelphia Eagles in 1996. After Rodney Peete suffered a season ending knee injury, Detmer became the team's starting quarterback. Detmer posted a 4–0 record in his first four starts. In his first start against the division rival New York Giants, Detmer completed 18 of 33 passes for 170 yards and no interceptions in the 19–10 victory. In his second start, he threw four touchdown passes (all to Irving Fryar) against the Miami Dolphins. The following week, he passed for a career-high 342 yards against the Carolina Panthers. The next week, he passed for 217 yards and a touchdown and added his first career rushing touchdown against the Dallas Cowboys. It was Philadelphia's first victory at Dallas since 1991, and earned Detmer the NFL Player of the Week award. A few weeks later, Detmer and the Eagles ended a three-game losing streak as they shut out the Giants in the rematch 24–0. Detmer threw three touchdowns in the win. For the year, Detmer passed for 2,911 yards and 15 touchdowns; his 80.8 passer rating ranked fourth among NFC quarterbacks. The Eagles posted a 7–4 record with Detmer as the starter during the 1996 season, good enough to make the NFC playoffs. The following season, Detmer shared quarterback duties with Peete and Bobby Hoying.

=== San Francisco 49ers ===
Detmer left Philadelphia in 1998 and joined the San Francisco 49ers as a backup to Steve Young. He spent only one season in San Francisco. His lone start came against the Panthers in which he passed for 276 yards and 3 touchdowns in the 49ers' 25–23 victory. He was also the primary holder on field goals and PAT attempts, throwing a touchdown off a botched field goal attempt during a loss to the Patriots.

=== Cleveland Browns ===
Detmer was traded to the Cleveland Browns in 1999; the Browns wanted him to mentor rookie quarterback Tim Couch. Detmer started the first game of the 1999 season, then served as backup until Couch sprained his foot in week 15. He started the final game of the 1999 season. Detmer injured his right Achilles and was inactive the entire 2000 season.

=== Detroit Lions ===
Detmer spent three seasons (2001–2003) with the Detroit Lions where he started four games during the 2001 season. His first start was a disaster: he threw seven interceptions against the Browns, the second-highest single-game total in NFL history (tied with seven other players). He was eventually replaced as starter, but did start the final two games of the season. He set career highs for attempts (50) and completions (31) against the Chicago Bears, finishing with 303 passing yards. He closed out the season with 242 yards and 2 touchdowns against the Cowboys.

=== Atlanta Falcons ===
Detmer spent the 2004 and 2005 seasons with the Atlanta Falcons, but did not see any action as the third-string quarterback behind Michael Vick and Matt Schaub.

In 14 total seasons in the NFL, Detmer played in 54 games (with 25 starts), totaling 6,351 yards passing with 34 touchdowns and 35 interceptions. Detmer did not officially retire from football at the time of his release from Atlanta, but he has not played since then.

== Coaching career ==
In December 2009, he was appointed the new head football coach at St. Andrew's Episcopal School. In December 2015, Detmer became the offensive coordinator and quarterbacks coach at BYU, under new head coach Kalani Sitake. On November 27, 2017, Detmer was released from the coordinator position after just two seasons. The dismissal came following BYU football's poor performance over the previous year. Detmer was the head football coach at American Leadership Academy's Queen Creek campus. He recently (2024) moved from the ALA-Queen Creek football program to ALA-Gilbert North North Football Program, assuming the Head Coach position at ALA-Gilbert North.

== NFL career statistics ==
| Year | Team | Games | | Passing | | | | | | | | Rushing | | | |
| Year | Team | GP | GS | Cmp | Att | Pct | Yds | Avg | TD | Int | Rtg | Att | Yds | Avg | TD |
|---|---|---|---|---|---|---|---|---|---|---|---|---|---|---|---|
| 1992 | GB | 0 | 0 | DNP | | | | | | | | | | | |
| 1993 | GB | 3 | 0 | 3 | 5 | 60.0 | 26 | 5.2 | 0 | 0 | 73.7 | 1 | -2 | -2.0 | 0 |
| 1994 | GB | 0 | 0 | DNP | | | | | | | | | | | |
| 1995 | GB | 4 | 0 | 8 | 16 | 50.0 | 81 | 5.1 | 1 | 1 | 59.6 | 3 | 3 | 1.0 | 0 |
| 1996 | PHI | 13 | 11 | 238 | 401 | 64.4 | 2,911 | 7.3 | 15 | 13 | 80.8 | 31 | 69 | 1.9 | 1 |
| 1997 | PHI | 8 | 7 | 134 | 244 | 54.9 | 1,567 | 6.4 | 7 | 6 | 73.9 | 14 | 46 | 3.3 | 1 |
| 1998 | SF | 16 | 1 | 24 | 38 | 63.2 | 312 | 8.2 | 4 | 3 | 91.1 | 8 | 7 | 0.9 | 0 |
| 1999 | CLE | 5 | 2 | 47 | 91 | 51.6 | 548 | 6.0 | 4 | 2 | 75.7 | 6 | 38 | 6.3 | 1 |
| 2000 | CLE | 0 | 0 | DNP | | | | | | | | | | | |
| 2001 | DET | 4 | 4 | 92 | 151 | 60.9 | 906 | 6.0 | 3 | 10 | 56.9 | 9 | 26 | 2.9 | 0 |
| 2002 | DET | 0 | 0 | DNP | | | | | | | | | | | |
| 2003 | DET | 1 | 0 | 0 | 0 | 0.0 | 0 | 0.0 | 0 | 0 | 0.0 | 0 | 0 | 0.0 | 0 |
| 2004 | ATL | 0 | 0 | DNP | | | | | | | | | | | |
| 2005 | ATL | 0 | 0 | DNP | | | | | | | | | | | |
| Career | | 54 | 25 | 546 | 946 | 57.7 | 6,351 | 6.7 | 34 | 35 | 74.7 | 72 | 177 | 2.5 | 3 |

== Personal life ==
Detmer's brother, Koy Detmer, is a former NFL quarterback, and their father, Sonny, was a prominent San Antonio high school coach.

Detmer joined the Church of Jesus Christ of Latter-day Saints in February 1991. He later helped one of his teammates, former BYU offensive lineman, Garett Tujague, join the church, on November 5, 2009.

Detmer was a major investor in, and employed by, the Athlete Services Division at Triton Financial Corporation from 2007 to 2009. After the firm collapsed, founder Kurt Barton was indicted for fraud. Detmer, who was not implicated in the scandal, claims to have lost more money than anyone else. Overly trusting of Barton, whom he met at church, Detmer became a victim of affinity fraud.

== See also ==
- List of NCAA Division I FBS career passing yards leaders
- List of NCAA Division I FBS career passing touchdowns leaders
- List of NCAA major college football yearly passing leaders
- List of NCAA major college football yearly total offense leaders
