= 1991 All-America college football team =

Official list of the best college football players of 1991

The 1991 All-America college football team is composed of college football players who were selected as All-Americans by various organizations and publications that chose College Football All-America Teams in 1991. It is an honor given annually to the best American college football players at their respective positions.

The National Collegiate Athletic Association (NCAA) recognizes five selectors as "official" for the 1991 season. They are: (1) the American Football Coaches Association (AFCA); (2) the Associated Press (AP); (3) the Football Writers Association of America (FWAA); (4) the United Press International (UPI); and (5) the Walter Camp Football Foundation (WCFF). Other notable selectors included Football News, Scripps Howard (SH), The Sporting News (TSN), and the Newspaper Enterprise Association in conjunction with World Almanac.

Nine players were unanimously selected by all five official selectors. They are: running back Vaughn Dunbar of Indiana; wide receiver Desmond Howard of Michigan; center Jay Leeuwenburg of Colorado; tackle Greg Skrepenak of Michigan; defensive ends Santana Dotson of Baylor and Steve Emtman of Washington; linebacker Robert Jones of East Carolina; defensive back Terrell Buckley of Florida State; and punter Mark Bounds of Texas Tech. Desmond Howard also won the 1991 Heisman Trophy.

== Consensus All-Americans ==
The following charts identify the NCAA-recognized consensus All-Americans for the year 1991 and display which first-team designations they received.

== Full selections - offense ==
=== Quarterback ===
- Ty Detmer, Brigham Young (CFHOF) (AFCA, AP-1, FWAA, UPI-1, NEA)
- Casey Weldon, Florida State (AP-2, WCFF, FN, SH])
- Shane Matthews, Florida (AP-3, UPI-2)

=== Running backs ===
- Vaughn Dunbar, Indiana (AFCA, AP-1, FWAA, UPI-1, WCFF, FN, NEA, SH)
- Trevor Cobb, Rice (AFCA, AP-2, UPI-1, FN)
- Russell White, California (AP-2, FWAA, UPI-2, WCFF, NEA)
- Marshall Faulk, San Diego St. (AP-1, SH)
- Amp Lee, Florida State (WCFF)
- Tony Sands, Kansas (AP-3, UPI-2)
- Derek Brown, Nebraska (AP-3)

=== Wide receivers ===
- Desmond Howard, Michigan (CFHOF) (AFCA, AP-1, FWAA, UPI-1, WCFF, FN, NEA, SH, TSN)
- Mario Bailey, Washington (AP-1, FWAA, UPI-1, NEA)
- Carl Pickens, Tennessee (AFCA, AP-2, UPI-2, FN, SH, TSN)
- Sean LaChapelle, UCLA (AP-2, UPI-2)
- Aaron Turner, Pacific (AP-3)
- Michael Smith, Kansas State (AP-3)

=== Tight end ===
- Kelly Blackwell, TCU (AFCA, AP-1, UPI-1, FN, SH, TSN)
- Derek Brown, Notre Dame (WCFF, NEA)
- Mark Chmura, Boston College (AP-2, FWAA, UPI-2)
- Johnny Mitchell, Nebraska (AP-3)

=== Tackles ===
- Greg Skrepenak, Michigan (AFCA, AP-1, FWAA, UPI-1, WCFF, FN, NEA, SH, TSN)
- Bob Whitfield, Stanford (AP-1, UPI-1, FN, NEA, SH, TSN)
- Leon Searcy, Miami (Fla.) (AP-2, FWAA, UPI-2, SH)
- Ray Roberts, Virginia (AFCA, AP-2, UPI-2, SH)
- Troy Auzenne, California (AFCA, AP-3)
- Eugene Chung, Virginia Tech (FWAA)
- Lincoln Kennedy, Washington (AP-3)

=== Guards ===
- Jeb Flesch, Clemson (AP-1, UPI-1, WCFF, FN, NEA)
- Mirko Jurkovic, Notre Dame (AP-2, UPI-1, WCFF, FN, NEA, TSN)
- Jerry Ostroski, Tulsa (AP-1, FWAA, UPI-2, TSN)
- Tim Simpson, Illinois (AFCA, AP-3, UPI-2)
- Will Shields, Nebraska (AP-2)
- Hesham Ismail, Florida (AP-3)

=== Center ===
- Jay Leeuwenburg, Colorado (AFCA, AP-1, FWAA, UPI-1, WCFF, FN, NEA, SH, TSN)
- Cal Dixon, Florida (AP-2)
- Mike Devlin, Iowa (AP-3, UPI-2)

== Full selections - defense ==
=== Linemen ===
- Steve Emtman, Washington (CFHOF) (AFCA, AP-1, FWAA, UPI-1, WCFF, FN, NEA, SH, TSN)
- Santana Dotson, Baylor (AFCA, AP-1, FWAA, UPI-1, WCFF, FN, SH, TSN)
- Brad Culpepper, Florida (AFCA, AP-1, UPI-2, FN, NEA, SH, TSN)
- Leroy Smith, Iowa (AFCA, AP-1)
- Robert Stewart, Alabama (AP-2, UPI-1, NEA, TSN)
- Rob Bodine, Clemson (AP-2, FWAA)
- Joel Steed, Colorado (AP-3, UPI-2, WCFF)
- Shane Dronett, Texas (AP-3, UPI-2, WCFF)
- James Patton, Texas (AP-2)
- Rusty Medearis, Miami (AP-2, UPI-2)
- Robin Jones, Baylor (AP-3)
- Chris Slade, Virginia (AP-3)

=== Linebackers ===
- Robert Jones, East Carolina (AFCA, AP-1, FWAA, UPI-1, WCFF, FN, NEA, SH, TSN)
- Marvin Jones, Florida State (AP-1, FWAA, UPI-1, WCFF, NEA, SH, TSN)
- Levon Kirkland, Clemson (AFCA, UPI-2, WCFF, SH, TSN)
- Marco Coleman, Georgia Tech (AP-2, FWAA, UPI-2, NEA, SH)
- Darrin Smith, Miami (Fla.) (AP-2, UPI-1, FN)
- Joe Bowden, Oklahoma (AP-1, UPI-2, FN)
- Steve Tovar, Ohio State (AFCA, AP-3)
- Dave Hoffmann, Washington (AP-2, FWAA)
- Erick Anderson, Michigan (AP-3, UPI-1)
- Quentin Coryatt, Texas A&M (NEA)
- Demetrius DuBose, Notre Dame (FN)
- Ed McDaniel, Clemson (AP-3)

=== Defensive backs ===
- Terrell Buckley, Florida State (AFCA, AP-1, FWAA, UPI-1, WCFF, FN, NEA, SH, TSN)
- Dale Carter, Tennessee (AP-1, FWAA, UPI-1, WCFF, FN, NEA, SH, TSN)
- Darryl Williams, Miami (Fla.) (AFCA, AP-1, WCFF, SH)
- Kevin Smith, Texas A&M (AFCA, AP-1, UPI-2, WCFF, FN, SH, TSN)
- Troy Vincent, Wisconsin (AP-2, FWAA, UPI-1, FN, NEA, TSN)
- Matt Darby, UCLA (AFCA, AP-2, UPI-1)
- Darren Perry, Penn State (AP-2, FWAA, UPI-2, NEA)
- Willie Clay, Georgia Tech (AP-2, UPI-2)
- Eric Castle, Oregon (AP-3)
- Sean Lumpkin, Minnesota (AP-3)
- Carlton Gray, UCLA (AP-3)
- Tracy Saul, Texas Tech (AP-3, UPI-2)

== Full selections - special teams ==
=== Placekicker ===
- Carlos Huerta, Miami (Fla.) (AFCA, AP-1, NEA, UPI-2, WCFF, SH, TSN, FN)
- Jason Hanson, Washington State (UPI-1, FWAA)
- Dan Eichioff, Kansas (AP-2)
- Jason Elam, Hawaii (AP-3)

=== Punter ===
- Mark Bounds, Texas Tech (AFCA, AP-1, FWAA, UPI-1, WCFF, FN, NEA, SH, TSN)
- Jason Christ, Air Force (AP-2, UPI-2)
- Pete Raether, Arkansas (AP-3)

=== All-purpose / kick returners ===
- Kevin Williams, Miami (Fla.) (FWAA [punt returner], TSN)
- Qadry Ismail, Syracuse (AP-3 [all purpose], FWAA [kickoff returner])
- Ryan Benjamin, Pacific (AP-1 [return specialist])
- Dion Johnson, East Carolina (AP-2 [all purpose])

== Key ==
- **Bold** – Used for (1) consensus All-American and (2) first-team selections by an official selector
- CFHOF - Inducted into the College Football Hall of Fame
- -1 – First-team selection
- -2 – Second-team selection
- -3 – Third-team selection

=== Official selectors ===
- AFCA = American Football Coaches Association for Kodak
- AP = Associated Press
- FWAA = Football Writers Association of America
- UPI = United Press International
- WC = Walter Camp Football Foundation chosen by coaches and sports information directors at 105 Division I-A schools

=== Other selectors ===
- FN = Football News
- NEA = Newspaper Enterprise Association
- SH = Scripps Howard News Service
- TSN = The Sporting News

== See also ==
- 1991 All-Atlantic Coast Conference football team
- 1991 All-Big Eight Conference football team
- 1991 All-Big Ten Conference football team
- 1991 All-Pacific-10 Conference football team
- 1991 All-SEC football team
