= John Derby =

American football player (born 1968)

No. 52
- Position: Linebacker

Personal information
- Born: March 24, 1968 (age 58); Oconomowoc, Wisconsin, U.S.
- Listed height: 6 ft 0 in (1.83 m)
- Listed weight: 232 lb (105 kg)

Career information
- High school: Oconomowoc
- College: Iowa
- NFL draft: 1992: undrafted

Career history
- Detroit Lions (1992); Cleveland Browns (1994)*
- * Offseason or practice squad member only

Awards and highlights
- 2× Second-team All-Big Ten (1990, 1991)
- Stats at Pro Football Reference

John Derby (born March 24, 1968) is a former linebacker in the National Football League (NFL). Derby was a member of the Detroit Lions during the 1992 NFL season.

His son, A. J., is a tight end with the New England Patriots of the NFL, and his son, Zach, is a tight-end, with the Iowa Hawkeyes football team. Derby is also the brother of former NFL player Glenn Derby.
