= Vaughn Dunbar =

American football player (born 1968)

No. 32
- Position: Running back

Personal information
- Born: September 4, 1968 (age 58); Fort Wayne, Indiana, U.S.
- Listed height: 5 ft 10 in (1.78 m)
- Listed weight: 204 lb (93 kg)

Career information
- High school: R. Nelson Snider (Fort Wayne)
- College: NE State (OK) (1987–1989) Indiana (1990–1991)
- NFL draft: 1992: 1st round, 21st overall pick

Career history
- New Orleans Saints (1992–1995); Jacksonville Jaguars (1995); San Francisco Demons (2001)

Awards and highlights
- PFWA All-Rookie Team (1992); Jim Brown Award (1991); Unanimous All-American (1991); First-team All-Big Ten (1991); Second-team All-Big Ten (1990); 1991 Copper Bowl Offensive MVP; Indiana Football Hall of Fame

Career NFL statistics
- Rushing yards: 935
- Rushing average: 3.5
- Rushing touchdowns: 5
- Stats at Pro Football Reference

Vaughn Allen Dunbar (born September 4, 1968) is an American former professional football player who was a running back in the National Football League (NFL) for three seasons. He played college football for the Indiana Hoosiers, and earned consensus All-American accolades. A first-round choice in the 1992 NFL draft, he played professionally for the New Orleans Saints and Jacksonville Jaguars of the NFL.

== Early life ==
Dunbar was born in Fort Wayne, Indiana. He graduated from R. Nelson Snider High School in Fort Wayne, where he was a standout high school football player for the Snider Panthers.

== College career ==
Dunbar first attended Northeastern Oklahoma A&M College, before accepting an athletic scholarship to attend Indiana University Bloomington and play for the Hoosiers teams in 1990 and 1991. His smooth and shifty running style and physique reminded many commentators of Florida's Emmitt Smith. With 4.5/4.6 speed in the 40-yard dash, Dunbar made up for the lack of explosive speed with "between the tackles toughness," outstanding balance and vision. He was one of the first in college to wear a reflective/shaded facemask visor making it difficult for Big Ten defenders to see where his eyes were looking.

Dunbar and fellow Hoosier running back Anthony Thompson brought national media attention to the Hoosiers' often overlooked football program. As a senior in 1991, he was recognized as a consensus first-team All-American and finished sixth in Heisman Trophy balloting after being ranked second in the nation in rushing yards per game.

- 1990: 250 carries for 1,224 yards with 13 TD. 16 catches for 122 yards.
- 1991: 364 carries for 1,805 yards with 12 TD. 29 catches for 263 yards.

== Professional career ==
Pre-draft measurables
Height	Weight	Arm length	Hand span	40-yard dash	10-yard split	20-yard split	20-yard shuttle	Vertical jump	Broad jump	Bench press
5 ft 9 5/8 in (1.77 m)	204 lb (93 kg)	31 in (0.79 m)	9 3/8 in (0.24 m)	4.55 s	1.60 s	2.65 s	4.19 s	35.0 in (0.89 m)	10 ft 0 in (3.05 m)	17 reps

The New Orleans Saints selected Dunbar in the first round, 21st pick overall, of the 1992 NFL draft. He played for the Saints in 1992 and again in 1994 and 1995. He finished his NFL career with the Jacksonville Jaguars in 1995. In his three NFL seasons, he compiled 965 rushing yards and five touchdowns on 267 carries.

Dunbar was subsequently the sixth overall draft pick of the XFL's San Francisco Demons in 2001. He started all games for the first 4 weeks but was released after gaining just 29 yards on 25 carries. He subsequently retired from professional football.

== Personal life ==
Dunbar now works for Precision Hose, Inc. in Stone Mountain, Georgia.

== See also ==
- List of college football yearly rushing leaders
