= Mike Saunders (Canadian football) =

American gridiron football player (born 1969)

Profile
- Position: Running back

Personal information
- Born: October 3, 1969 (age 57); Milton, Wisconsin, U.S.

Career information
- College: Iowa
- NFL draft: 1992: 10th round, 262nd overall pick

Career history
- 1992–1994: Saskatchewan Roughriders
- 1995: San Antonio Texans
- 1996: Montreal Alouettes
- 1996: Hamilton Tiger-Cats
- 1997: Toronto Argonauts
- 1997–1999: Saskatchewan Roughriders

Awards and highlights
- CFL All-Star (1995); CFL West All-Star (1994); CFL South All-Star (1995)

Mike Saunders (born October 3, 1969) is an American former professional Canadian football running back who played eight seasons in the Canadian Football League (CFL) for five different teams. He was selected by the Pittsburgh Steelers in the tenth round of the 1992 NFL draft with the 262nd overall pick.

== Biography ==
Saunders was born in Milton, Wisconsin and attended the University of Iowa. He was named CFL All-Star in 1995. He retired on May 8, 2000, as the Saskatchewan Roughriders second all-time leading rusher with 872 carries for 4,396 yards and 39 touchdowns. Over eight CFL seasons, he rushed 1,160 times for 5,780 yards and 39 touchdowns.
