= Washington Huskies football =

Football team of the University of Washington

2026 Washington Huskies football team
- First season: 1889; 137 years ago
- Athletic director: Patrick Chun
- Head coach: Jedd Fisch; 3rd season, 22–15 (.595)
- Location: Seattle, Washington
- Stadium: Husky Stadium (capacity: 70,138)
- NCAA division: Division I FBS
- Conference: Big Ten
- Colors: Purple and gold
- All-time record: 792–470–50 (.623)
- CFP record: 1–2 (.333)
- Bowl record: 22–22–1 (.500)

National championships
- Claimed: 1960, 1991
- Unclaimed: 1910, 1984, 1990

National finalist
- CFP: 2023

College Football Playoff appearances
- 2016, 2023

Conference championships
- Northwest Intercollegiate Athletic Association; 1902, 1903 Northwest Conference; 1908, 1909, 1910, 1911, 1912, 1913, 1914, 1915, 1916, 1922, 1923, 1925 Pacific Coast Conference; 1916, 1919, 1925, 1936 Pac-12 Conference; 1959, 1960, 1963, 1977, 1980, 1981, 1990, 1991, 1992, 1995, 2000, 2016, 2018, 2023

Division championships
- Pac-12 North: 2016, 2017, 2018, 2020
- Consensus All-Americans: 23
- Rivalries: Washington State (rivalry); Oregon (rivalry); Northwest Championship

Uniforms
- Fight song: Bow Down to Washington
- Mascot: Dubs II; Harry the Husky
- Marching band: University of Washington Husky Marching Band
- Outfitter: Adidas
- Website: gohuskies.com

The Washington Huskies football team represents the University of Washington in college football. Washington competes in the NCAA Division I Football Bowl Subdivision (FBS) as a member of the Big Ten Conference, having been a charter member of the Pac-12 Conference between 1915 and 2024. The 70,138-capacity Husky Stadium, located on campus in Seattle, has been the Huskies' home field since 1920.

Washington was one of four charter members of what became the Pac-12 Conference and, along with California, was one of only two schools with uninterrupted membership until the 2024 conference realignment. Washington has won 18 conference championships, seven Rose Bowls, and claims two national championships recognized by NCAA-designated major selectors. The 1960 team defeated that year's AP and UPI national champions, Minnesota, on the field in the 1961 Rose Bowl and were recognized as national champions by the Helms Athletic Foundation. Their most recent national title was in 1991, when the Huskies finished the season undefeated at 12–0 with a No. 1 ranking in the Coaches' Poll and defeated Michigan in the 1992 Rose Bowl. From 1977 through 2003, Washington had 27 consecutive non-losing seasons—the most of any team in the Pac-12 and the 14th longest streak by an NCAA Division I-A team. The Huskies finished out its Pac-12 legacy with a perfect 12–0 regular season before defeating rival Oregon in the last Pac-12 Championship Game and Texas in the Sugar Bowl. The team finished 14–1 after being defeated in the 2024 NCAA Championship Game by Michigan in a rematch of the 1992 Rose Bowl.

Washington's 422 conference victories rank second in the legacy Pac-12's history. The school's all-time record ranks 22nd by win percentage and 18th by total victories among FBS schools as of 2023. Washington holds the FBS record for the longest unbeaten streak at 64 consecutive games, as well as the second-longest winning streak at 40 wins in a row. There have been a total of 13 unbeaten seasons in school history, including eight perfect seasons. Washington is often referred to as a top "Quarterback U" due to the long history of its quarterbacks playing in the National Football League (NFL). Dating back to Hall of Famer Warren Moon in 1976, 17 of the last 23 quarterbacks who have led the team in passing for at least one season have gone on to play in the NFL.

The Huskies have donned several purple-gold combinations in their history, with the current and most widely-known scheme featuring purple jerseys with gold pants and helmets. There are several team symbols: the fight song, "Bow Down to Washington"; the Husky Marching Band; and two official mascots (Dubs II and Harry the Husky). Washington's fiercest and most prominent rivalry is with Oregon, a game informally known as the Cascade Clash. They also contest the Apple Cup with Washington State.

== History ==
=== Early history (1889–1907) ===
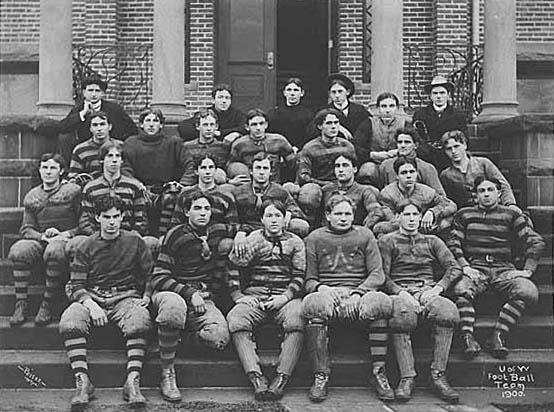
Photo of the 1900 University of Washington football team by Theodore Peiser

Although an informal game was played by a "University Eleven" as early as 1889, organized team football came to the University of Washington in 1892.

Ten different men served as Washington head coaches during the first 15 seasons. While still an independent, the team progressed from playing 1 to 2 games per season to 10 matches per season as the sport grew in popularity. The school initially used a variety of locations for its home field. Home attendance grew from a few hundred to a few thousand per home game, with on-campus Denny Field becoming home from 1895 onward. The 1900 team played in-state rival Washington State College to a 5–5 tie, in the first game in the annual contest later known as the Apple Cup.

=== Gil Dobie era (1908–1916) ===
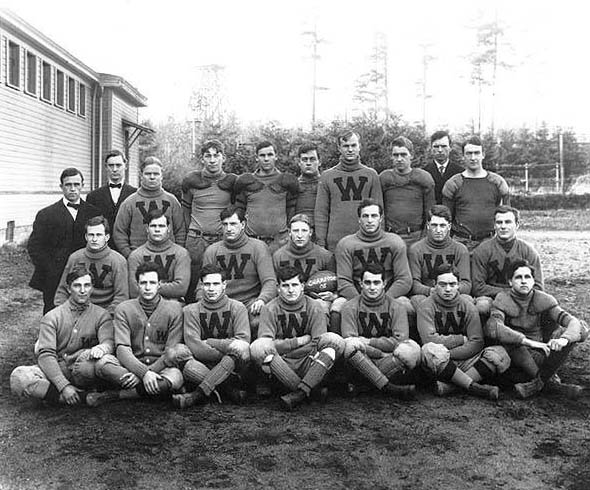
Photo of the undefeated 1908 University of Washington football team

Gil Dobie left North Dakota Agricultural and became Washington's head coach in 1908. Dobie coached for nine remarkable seasons at Washington, posting a 58–0–3 record. Dobie's career comprised virtually all of Washington's NCAA all-time longest 64-game unbeaten streak (outscoring opponents 1930–118) and included a 40-game winning streak, second longest in NCAA Division I-A/FBS history. In 1916, Washington and three other schools formed the Pacific Coast Conference, predecessor to the modern Pac-12 Conference. In Dobie's final season at Washington, his 1916 team won the PCC's inaugural conference championship. Dobie was inducted into the College Football Hall of Fame in 1951 as a charter member.

=== Hunt-Savage-Allison era (1917–1920) ===
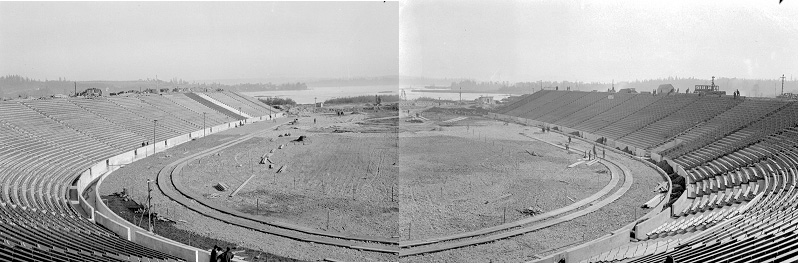
Husky Stadium under construction in 1920

Following Dobie's tenure, Washington turned to a succession of coaches with mixed results. Claude J. Hunt (1917, 1919) went a cumulative 6–3–1 highlighted by the school's second PCC championship in 1919. Tony Savage went 1–1 in 1918, and Stub Allison went 1–5 in 1920.

This era concluded with the team's move from Denny Field to its permanent home field of Husky Stadium in 1920. Washington athletics adopted the nickname of "Sun Dodgers" in 1920 and used it until 1921, before becoming the "Huskies" from 1922 onward.

=== Enoch Bagshaw era (1921–1929) ===
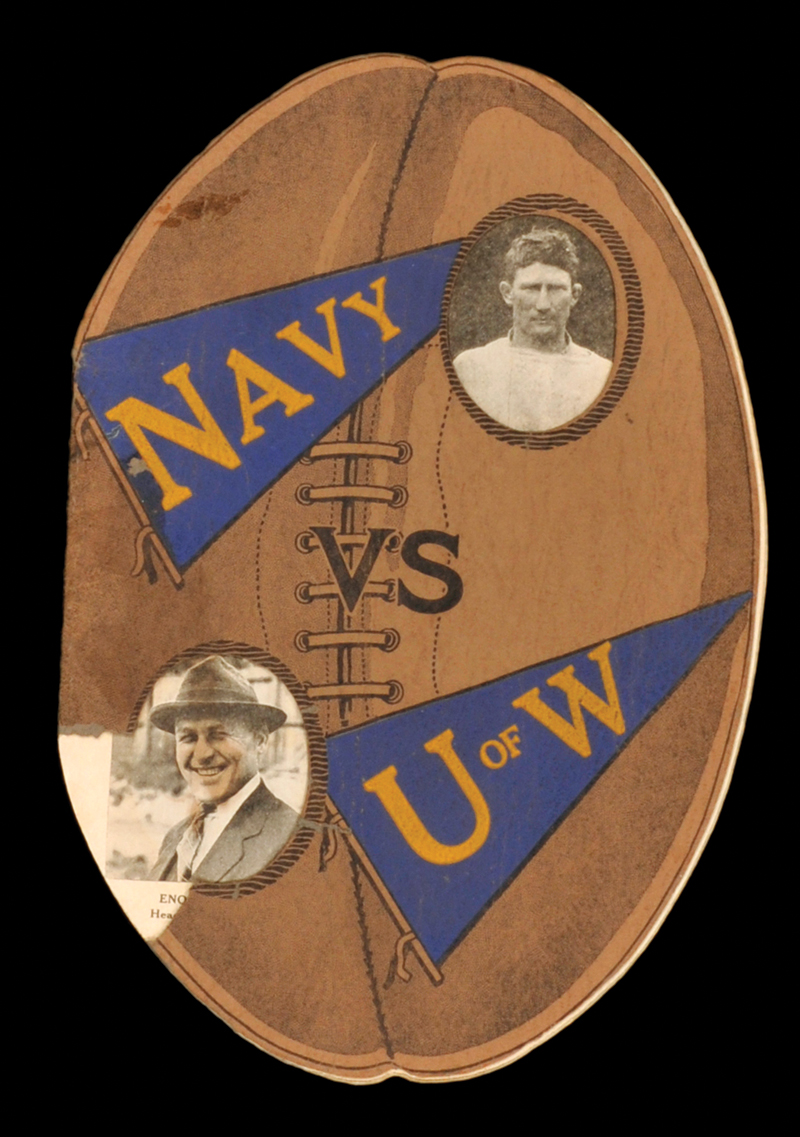
1924 Rose Bowl program cover

Enoch Bagshaw graduated from Washington in 1907 as the school's first five-year letterman in football history. After leading Everett High School from 1909 to 1920, including consecutive national championships in 1919 and 1920, Bagshaw returned to Washington as the first former player turned head coach in 1921, ultimately overseeing the program's second period of sustained success.

Bagshaw's tenure was marked by 63–22–6 record and the school's first two Rose Bowl berths, resulting in a 14–14 tie against Navy in the 1924 Rose Bowl and a 19–20 loss to Alabama in the 1926 Rose Bowl. His 1925 team won the school's third PCC championship. Bagshaw left the program after his 1929 team had a losing season, only the second such season in his tenure. Bagshaw died the following year at the age of 46.

=== James Phelan era (1930–1941) ===
James Phelan succeeded Bagshaw for the 1930 season. The Notre Dame graduate guided the Huskies to a 65–37–8 record over 12 seasons. His 1936 team won the school's fourth PCC championship, but lost in the 1937 Rose Bowl to Pittsburgh 21-0. Phelan guided the Huskies to their first bowl game victory, beating Hawaii 53–13 in the 1938 Poi Bowl. In later years, he became the first former Husky head coach to take the same role in professional football. Phelan was inducted into the College Football Hall of Fame in 1973.

=== Welch-Odell-Cherberg-Royal era (1942–1956) ===
Following Phelan, Washington fielded a succession of teams under four coaches without either great success, or failure. Washington participated in one bowl game and tallied no conference championships during this period with an overall record of 65–68–7.

Ralph Welch played at Purdue under head coach James Phelan, whom he followed to Washington to become an assistant coach in 1930. In 1942, Welch was promoted to succeed Phelan as Washington's head coach and served until 1947, compiling a record of 27–20–3. World War II limited both the 1943 and 1944 seasons of the PCC, reducing team participation from ten team down to just four. Welch's 1943 team accepted the school's third Rose Bowl bid, but lost to PCC champion USC 29–0 in the 1944 Rose Bowl. Welch's first five teams all fielded winning records, but final 1947 team did not.

Howie Odell joined Washington in 1948 from Yale. In his five seasons from 1948 to 1952, he compiled a record of 23–25–2 with two winning seasons.

John Cherberg, a Washington player and then assistant from 1946 to 1952, became head coach in 1953. He compiled a 10–18–2 record from 1953 to 1955, before being removed due to a payoff scandal. Cherberg went on to become Washington state's longest serving Lieutenant Governor, from 1957 until his death in 1989.

Darrell Royal was retained and led the 1956 team to a 5–5 record, before leaving to coach at Texas where he won three national championships, was inducted into the College Football Hall of Fame in 1983, and had the school's football stadium renamed in his honor as Darrell K Royal–Texas Memorial Stadium.

=== Jim Owens era (1957–1974) ===
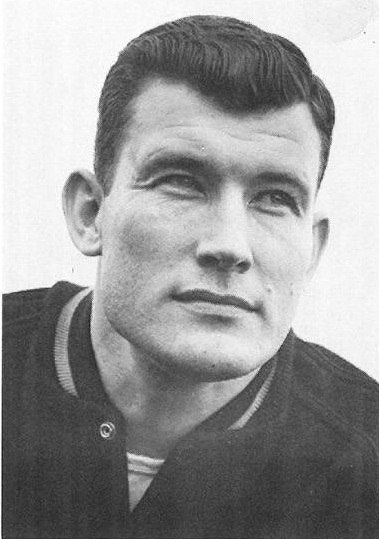
Coach Jim Owens

In 1957, Jim Owens came to Washington after stints as an assistant with Paul "Bear" Bryant at Kentucky and Texas A&M. According to legend, after the 1956 season, when the Huskies were looking for a head coach, Bryant indicated to reporters that Owens "will make a great coach for somebody some day." Over 18 seasons, Owens compiled a 99–82–6 record.

After a pair of unremarkable initial seasons, Owens led his 1959, 1960, and 1963 teams to three AAWU championships and associated Rose Bowl berths: a 1960 Rose Bowl 44–8 win over Wisconsin, a 1961 Rose Bowl 17–7 win over Minnesota, and a 17–7 loss to Illinois in the 1964 Rose Bowl. The Helms Athletic Foundation named the 1960 team the national champions, the school's first such title in football.

Owens' later teams did not match this level of success, partly owing to a conference prevention of a second bowl team representative until 1975. Owens concurrently served as the athletic director at Washington from 1960 to 1969. Owens resigned as head coach of the Huskies following the 1974 season, as the Pac-8's third winningest coach of all time. He was elected to the College Football Hall of Fame as a player in 1982.

=== Don James era (1975–1992) ===
Don James came to Washington from Kent State. During his 18-year tenure, James' Huskies won four Rose Bowls and one Orange Bowl. His dominating 1991 Washington Huskies finished a perfect 12–0 season and shared the national championship with Miami.

The Huskies won 22 consecutive games from 1990 to 1992. James' record with the Huskies was 153–57–2. James won national coach of the year honors in 1977, 1984 and 1991 and was inducted into the College Football Hall of Fame in 1997. Sports columnists and football experts have recognized the 1991 Washington Huskies among the top 10 college football teams of all time.

During the 1992 season, it was revealed that several of James' players received improper benefits from boosters. The Huskies received sanctions from both the NCAA and then Pacific-10 Conference. Although James and his staff were not personally implicated in any violation, James resigned on August 22, 1993 in protest of the harsh sanctions the Pac-10 imposed on top of the NCAA's sanctions against his team. Though then University President William Gerberding and then Athletic Director Barbara Hedges had presented James the final list of penalties that all Pac-10 parties had agreed best for the football program and athletics, Gerberding argued in favor of altering the penalties against the program from a two-year TV revenue ban and one-year bowl ban, to a one-year TV revenue ban and two-year bowl ban.

In a 2006 interview with columnist Blaine Newnham of The Seattle Times, Don James said his resignation from head coaching "probably saved his life". According to those who knew him, Don James was a great leader, a coach of character, a man of honor and integrity.

Don James died on October 20, 2013, at the age of 80. A week later, the Huskies honored James during the game against California, which they won 41-17. On October 27, 2017, when the University of Washington unveiled a bronze statue of the legendary coach in the northwest plaza of Husky Stadium, "the Dawgfather" finally returned home.

=== Jim Lambright era (1993–1998) ===
Jim Lambright was promoted from defensive coordinator to head coach following the sudden resignation by Don James. Lambright led the Huskies to four bowl appearances in his six seasons. Despite these bowl appearances and a 44–25–1 overall record, Lambright was fired by athletic director Barbara Hedges following the 1998 season after going 6–6.

=== Neuheisel and Gilbertson era (1999–2004) ===
Rick Neuheisel was hired away from Colorado to take over as the Huskies' head football coach. During his tenure, the Huskies went 33–16, highlighted by a victory in the 2001 Rose Bowl over Purdue. Neuheisel also led the Huskies to two berths in the Holiday Bowl and to the Sun Bowl during his four-year tenure.

In 2002, Neuheisel inspired his underperforming Huskies to win the inaugural "Northwest Championship" by sweeping their Pacific Northwest rivals.

Neuheisel was reprimanded by the NCAA for numerous recruiting violations. Neuheisel was fired in June 2003 after he admitted to taking part in a calcutta pool for the 2003 Men's NCAA basketball tournament. Neuheisel sued for wrongful termination, ultimately settling the case in March 2005 for $4.5 million, paid by the NCAA and Washington athletics department.

Keith Gilbertson was promoted from offensive coordinator to head coach following Neuheisel's termination. The 2003 season, Gilbertson's first, ended with a 6–6 record but no bowl appearance. A 1–10 record the next year resulted in his firing. The 1–10 mark in 2004 was only Washington's second since the end of World War II. In two seasons, Gilbertson's record was 7–16.

=== Tyrone Willingham era (2005–2008) ===
Former Stanford and Notre Dame head coach Tyrone Willingham was hired as the next head football coach of the Washington Huskies in order to clean up the program's off-the-field reputation. The Huskies failed to post a winning record in any of Willingham's four seasons, the best being 5–7 in 2006. Willingham's record at Washington was a dismal 11–37 (.229). Willingham was fired after a winless (0-12) 2008 season.

=== Steve Sarkisian era (2009–2013) ===
USC offensive coordinator Steve Sarkisian was named the 23rd head football coach at Washington following the firing of Willingham. Sarkisian, known as an offensive mind and quarterbacks coach, led the Huskies to a 34–29 record over five seasons, never winning more than eight games in a year but recording just one losing season. Sarkisian departed after the 2013 regular season to return to USC as the head football coach, becoming the first head coach to voluntarily leave Washington for another program since Darrell Royal in 1956.

=== Chris Petersen era (2014–2019) ===
Washington hired Chris Petersen as head football coach on December 6, 2013. Petersen previously spent eight seasons as the head coach at Boise State.

In his third year Petersen led Washington to a Pac-12 title and the program's first College Football Playoff appearance, the 2016 Peach Bowl. On April 11, 2017, the Washington Huskies Athletic Department extended Petersen's coaching contract through 2023, with a reported annual salary of $4.875 million, paid entirely from Washington Athletic Department revenue, such as ticket sales and television rights or gifts.

Washington finished the 2017 season with an invitation to participate in the 2017 Fiesta Bowl. In the 2018 season, Petersen led the Huskies to their second Pac-12 title in three years and Washington's 15th Rose Bowl appearance. On December 2, 2019, Petersen announced he would step down as head coach and move into an advisory role.

=== Jimmy Lake era (2020–2021) ===
Defensive coordinator Jimmy Lake was named Petersen's successor following his departure. He coached the team to a 3–1 record and a Pac-12 North division title during the COVID-19 shortened 2020 season. The team was unable to play in the 2020 Pac-12 Football Championship Game due to numerous COVID-related absences.

During the 2021 season, Lake was suspended without pay for shoving a Washington player during a loss to Oregon. Lake was later fired, finishing his tenure with a 7–6 record. Defensive coordinator Bob Gregory served as interim coach for the final three games of the season.

=== Kalen DeBoer era (2022–2023) ===
Washington hired Kalen DeBoer as head football coach on November 29, 2021. DeBoer spent the previous two seasons as head coach at Fresno State. DeBoer posted an 11–2 record in his first season at Washington, defeating Texas in the 2022 Alamo Bowl 27-20. In his second season with the team, DeBoer led the Huskies to a 14–1 record, winning the final Pac-12 conference championship against Oregon, and winning the Sugar Bowl against the Texas Longhorns in the 2024 College Football Playoff. The Huskies appeared in the 2024 National Championship game, losing to Michigan 34-13. Days after the National Championship game, DeBoer announced his departure from Washington to become the next head coach of the Alabama Crimson Tide, succeeding retiring Alabama head coach Nick Saban.

=== Jedd Fisch era (2024–present) ===
Following DeBoer's departure, Washington announced the hiring of former Arizona head coach Jedd Fisch on January 14, 2024. Washington will also leave the Pac-12 Conference for the Big Ten Conference.

== Conference affiliations ==
Washington played its first seasons of college football from 1889 to 1907 as an independent. Washington was a founding member of the Northwest Conference in 1908. In 1916, Washington became one of the four charter members of the Pacific Coast Conference (PCC) while also retaining membership in the Northwest Conference. The PCC folded following the 1958 season, with Washington and other members immediately forming the Athletic Association of Western Universities (AAWU) in 1959. The AAWU evolved into the Pacific-8 (1968–1977), Pacific-10 (1978–2010), and finally Pac-12 (2011–2024) conferences. The modern Pac-12 claimed the history of each of these preceding conferences back to the PCC as its own, with Washington and California as the only founding and continuous members. On August 4, 2023, amidst widespread conference realignment, the Big Ten Conference presidents and chancellor's unanimously voted to admit Washington and fellow Pac-12 rival Oregon as new members effective August 2, 2024.

- Independent (1889–1907)
- Northwest Conference (1908–1917, 1922–1925)
- Pacific Coast Conference (1916–1958)
- Pac-12 Conference (1959–2023)
  - Athletic Association of Western Universities (1959–1967)
  - Pacific-8 Conference (1968–1977)
  - Pacific-10 Conference (1978–2010)
  - Pac-12 Conference (2011–2023)
- Big Ten Conference (2024–present)

== Championships ==
=== National championships ===
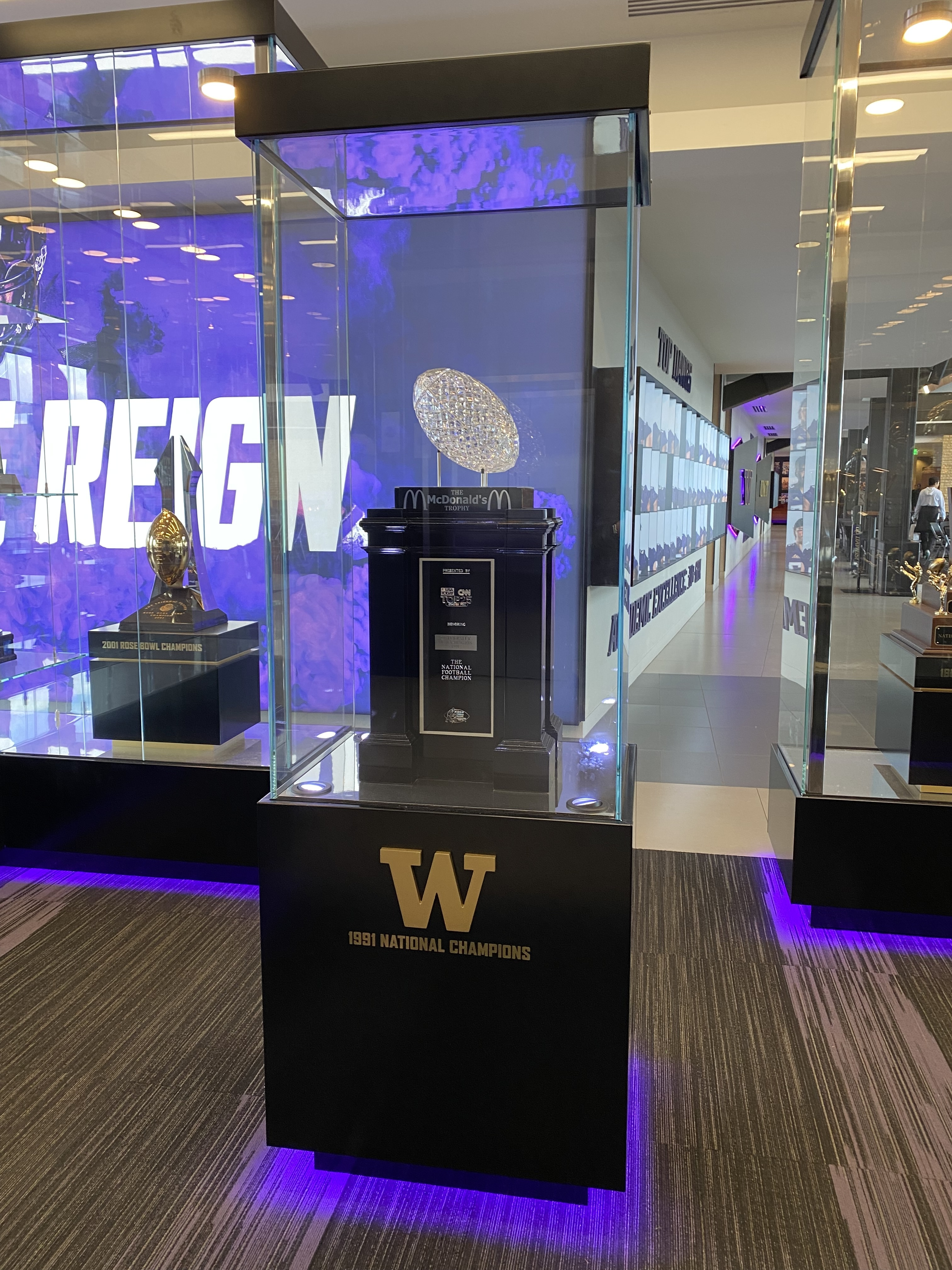
1991 Coaches Poll national championship trophy on display inside Husky Stadium

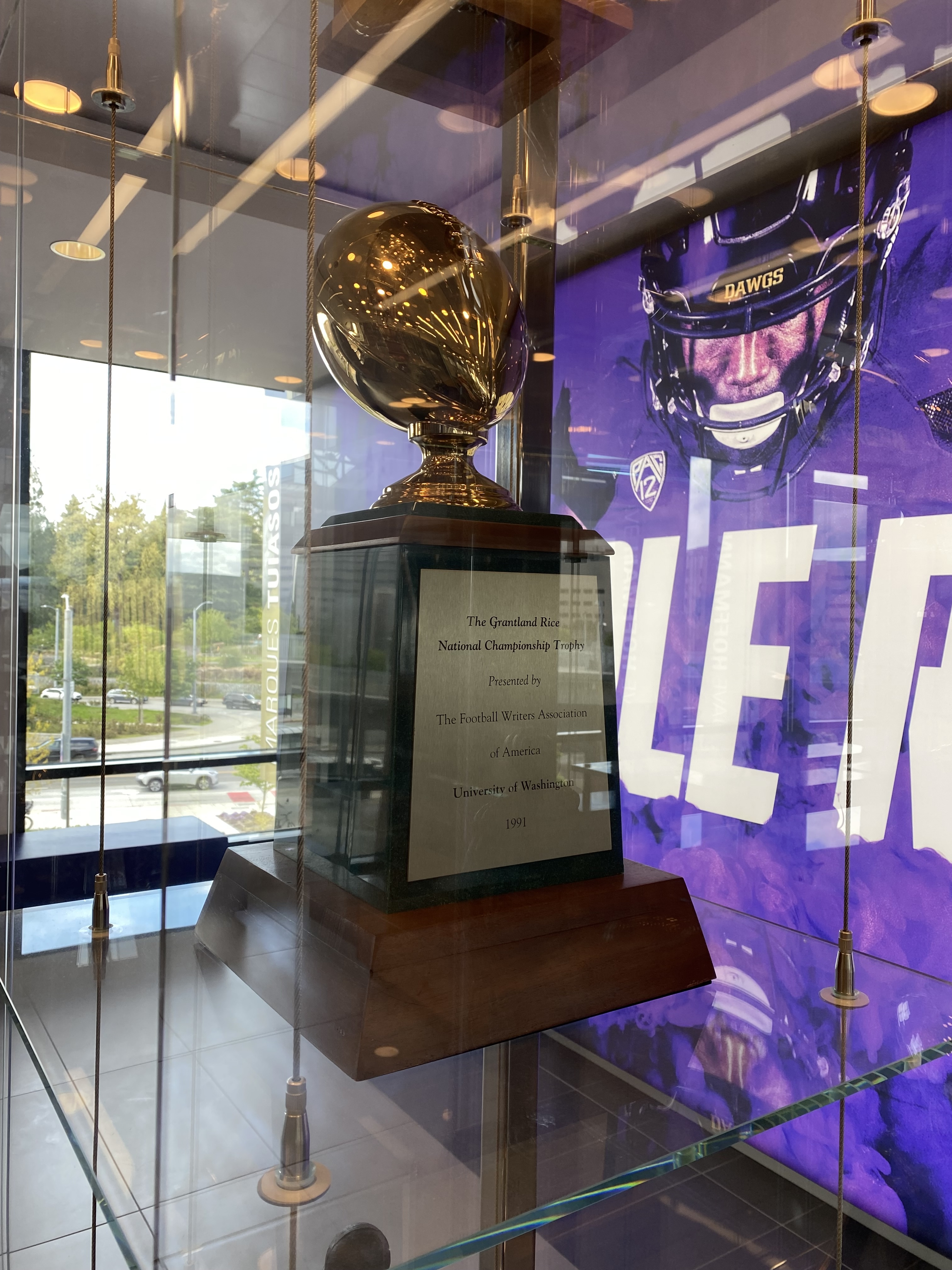
1991 Grantland Rice Trophy awarded by the Football Writers Association of America.

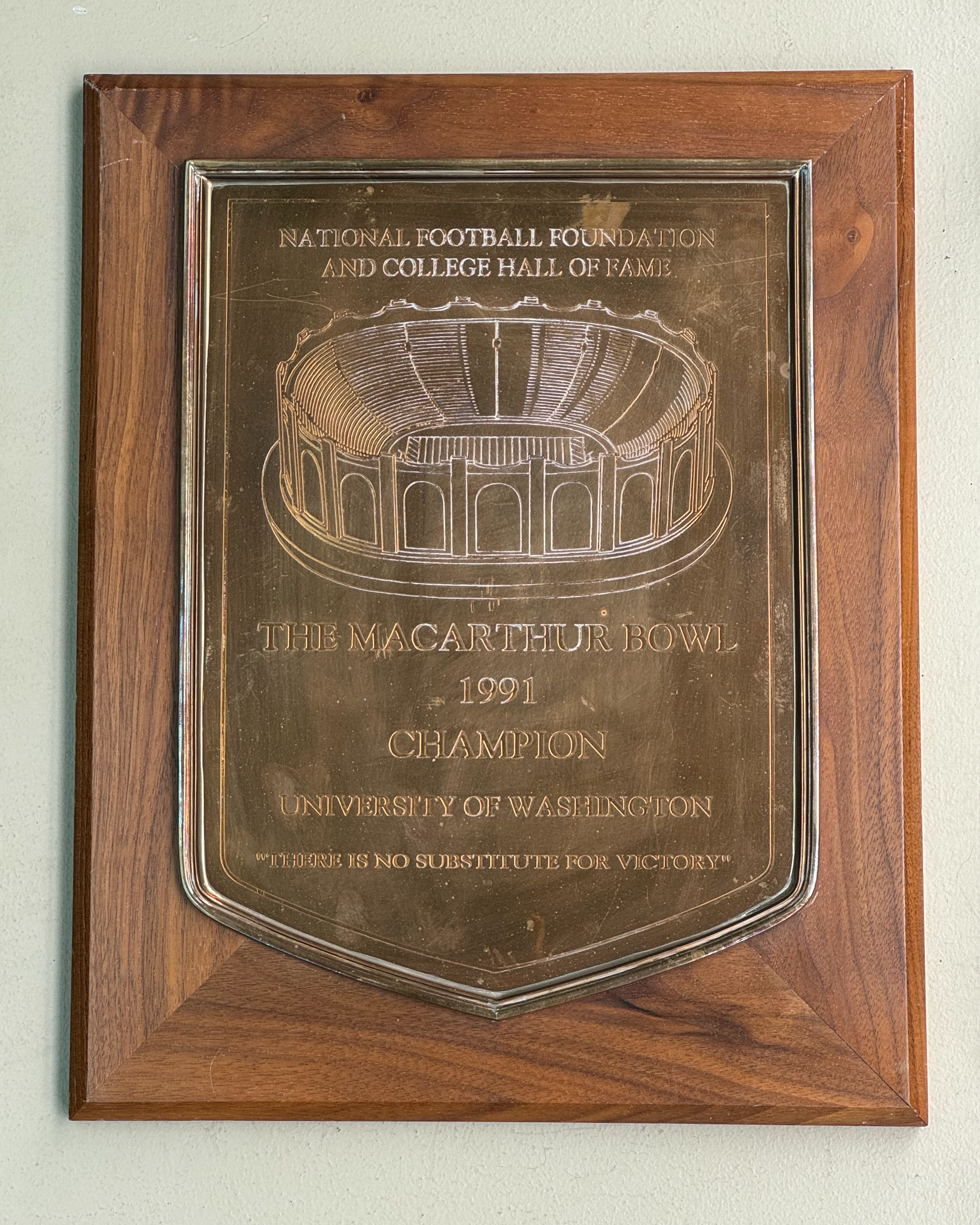
1991 MacArthur Bowl trophy plaque awarded by the National Football Foundation.

Washington claims two national championships in college football: 1960 and 1991.

The 1960 team was selected by the Helms Athletic Foundation following Washington's victory over AP and UPI national champion Minnesota in the 1961 Rose Bowl. In that era, the final wire service polls were taken at the end of the regular season.

The 1991 team finished No. 1 in the Coaches Poll and earned The Coaches' Trophy as well as the NFF MacArthur Bowl and the FWAA Grantland Rice Trophy. The title was split, with the AP Poll selecting Miami (FL).

==== Claimed national championships ====
Year	Coach	Selector	Record	Bowl	Opponent	Result	Final AP	Final Coaches
1960	Jim Owens	Helms Athletic Foundation	10–1	Rose Bowl	Minnesota	W 17–7	No. 6	No. 5
1991	Don James	B(QPRS), BR, DeS, DuS, FN, FWAA, MGR, NCF, R(FACT), SR, UPI/NFF, USAT/CNN	12–0	Rose Bowl	Michigan	W 34–14	No. 2	No. 1

==== Unclaimed national championships ====
In addition to their claimed titles, NCAA-designated "major selectors" also selected Washington for 1984 and 1990. Sportswriter Bill Libby selected the 1910 team in his book Champions of College Football.

Year	Coach	Selector	Record	Bowl	Opponent	Result	Final AP	Final Coaches
1910	Gil Dobie	Bill Libby (Note: Not an NCAA-designated major selector.)	6–0	N/A			–	–
1984	Don James	Berryman, Football News, National Championship Foundation (co-champion)	11–1	Orange Bowl	Oklahoma	W 28–17	No. 2	No. 2
1990	Don James	R(FACT) (4 co-champions)	10–2	Rose Bowl	Iowa	W 46–34	No. 5	No. 5

1960 season

The 1960 team took an improbable road to the Rose Bowl and national championship. After suffering a 1-point setback to Navy in the third week of the season, the team reeled off eight straight wins capped by a triumph over No. 1 Minnesota in the 1961 Rose Bowl. Because the final Associated Press and United Press International polls were conducted after the final game of the regular season, their Rose Bowl opponent Minnesota had already been named the AP and UPI national champion for 1960 prior to the game. In its poll conducted following the bowl games, the Football Writers Association of America recognized Ole Miss as its national champion. The Helms Athletic Foundation recognized Washington as national champions following their Rose Bowl victory.

1984 season

The 1984 team opened the 1984 college football season with a 9–0 record which included a 20–11 win at No. 4 Michigan in Michigan Stadium. While ranked No. 1 in the AP poll, the Huskies dropped a 16–7 game to eventual Pac-10 champion USC, which cost Washington a chance at the Rose Bowl. The Huskies instead were invited to play in the Orange Bowl against the No. 2 Oklahoma Sooners. The game is famous for the Sooner Schooner incident. After Oklahoma kicked a field goal to take a 17–14 lead in the fourth quarter, a penalty was called on the Sooners that nullified the play. The Sooner Schooner driver, who didn't see the flag, drove the wagon on the field and was immediately flagged for unsportsmanlike conduct. The ensuing field goal attempt was blocked and led a momentum shift that saw Washington score two touchdowns in less than a minute en route to a 28–17 victory. Senior Jacque Robinson rushed for 135 yards and was named MVP, the first player in history to be named MVP of both the Orange and Rose Bowls.

In winning, the Huskies became the first team from the Pac-10 to play in and win the Orange Bowl. The Huskies finished the year ranked No. 2 in the polls, behind the WAC champion BYU (13–0–0) who were 24–17 victors over the unranked Michigan Wolverines (6–5–0) in the Holiday Bowl. BYU's title was notable for being the only time since the inception of the AP poll that a team was awarded the national title without beating an opponent ranked in the top 25 at the season's end. The Huskies were given the opportunity to play BYU in the Holiday Bowl but chose a larger bowl payout over playing a higher ranked opponent in BYU, who carried a 22-game win streak into the bowl season. The Berryman System and the Football News and NCF polls awarded Washington their national titles, which the school does not claim.

1990 season

The 1990 Huskies started out the season with wins against San Jose State and Purdue, then beat No. 5 USC by a score of 31–0. The next week fell to eventual AP national champion Colorado. After the loss, Washington went on to finish the season averaging over 40 points a game while only giving up 14. During this run, Washington would end up beating two more ranked teams on their way to the Rose Bowl. However, in the second to last game Washington lost to UCLA. Washington subsequently entered the Rose Bowl with a record of 9–2 against Iowa. The Huskies won by a final score of 46–34 to secure their fifth Rose Bowl title, displaying its trademark NCAA-best run-defense which allowed 66.8 yards per game.

The AP awarded the national championship to Colorado, while the UPI chose undefeated Georgia Tech. Washington was ranked No. 5 in the AP poll, receiving no first place votes. The Rothman/FACT math system, active from 1968 to 2006, gave the Washington Huskies its co-national title for 1990, sharing the honor with Colorado, Georgia Tech, and Miami. The school does not claim this championship.

1991 season

The 1991 Huskies opened the 1991 season on the road, with a 42–7 victory over the Stanford Cardinal. Following a bye week, Washington traveled to Lincoln, Nebraska for a showdown with No. 9 Nebraska. Trailing 21–9 late in the third quarter, Washington rallied to score 27 unanswered points and claim a 36–21 victory. The following week saw the return of QB Mark Brunell, the 1991 Rose Bowl MVP who had suffered a knee injury in the spring, as the Huskies beat Kansas State 56–3 while holding the Wildcats to -17 yards on the ground. The Huskies followed with back-to-back shutouts of Arizona and Toledo. The Huskies then traveled to Berkeley to face No. 7 California. Washington won a wild game that was decided on the final play when Walter Bailey broke up a pass on the goal line to preserve a 24–17 win. Oregon and Arizona State visited Husky Stadium next and each left with a loss. The Huskies went on their final road trip of the season, first to USC, where they won in the Los Angeles Memorial Coliseum for the first time since 1980. Needing a win over Oregon State to clinch a Rose Bowl berth, Washington rolled to a 58–6 victory. Washington State visited Seattle for the Apple Cup but were no match for the Huskies, as Washington won 56–21, setting up a showdown with Michigan in the Rose Bowl on January 1, 1992.

The Washington defense, led by Lombardi Award and Outland Trophy winner Steve Emtman, held Michigan to only 205 total yards and limited 1991 Heisman Trophy winner Desmond Howard to only one catch. The Husky offense, led by quarterbacks Mark Brunell and Billy Joe Hobert, racked up 404 yards of total offense in leading the Huskies to a 34–14 Rose Bowl victory. Hobert and Emtman shared MVP honors.

- Steve Emtman (DT) and Mario Bailey (WR) were consensus All-American picks. Dave Hoffmann (LB) and Lincoln Kennedy (OT) were All-American selections.
- Don James was voted Pac-10 and National Coach of the Year.
- Steve Emtman was the Pac-10 Defensive Player of the Year and Mario Bailey was the Pac-10 Offensive Player of the Year.
- Mario Bailey (WR), Ed Cunningham (C), Steve Emtman (DT), Chico Fraley (LB), Dana Hall (CB), Dave Hoffmann (LB), Donald Jones (LB) and Lincoln Kennedy (OL) were First Team All-Pac-10.
- The Huskies led the NCAA in total defense for most of the year, allowing only 237.1 yards per game.

The Huskies were voted national champions by the USA Today/CNN coaches Poll, while the Miami Hurricanes topped the AP Poll. The 1991 team averaged over 41 points per game, only once scoring fewer than 20 points, and held opponents to an average of less than 10 points per game, including two shutouts.

=== Rose Bowl championships ===
Washington has 7 Rose Bowl championships and one tie. The program been continuously affiliated with the Pac-12 Conference and its predecessors, which historically agreed to send a representative (typically the conference champion) to participate in the Rose Bowl. The Big Ten Conference was similarly contracted following World War II. This pairing made the Rose Bowl the most prestigious Bowl Game available to Pac-12 teams prior to the BCS era.

Year	Coach	Game	Opponent	Result
1923	Enoch Bagshaw	1924 Rose Bowl	Navy	T 14–14
1959	Jim Owens	1960 Rose Bowl	Wisconsin	W 44–8
1960	Jim Owens	1961 Rose Bowl	Minnesota	W 17–7
1977	Don James	1978 Rose Bowl	Michigan	W 27–20
1981	Don James	1982 Rose Bowl	Iowa	W 28–0
1990	Don James	1991 Rose Bowl	Iowa	W 46–34
1991	Don James	1992 Rose Bowl	Michigan	W 34–14
2000	Rick Neuheisel	2001 Rose Bowl	Purdue	W 34–24

=== Conference championships ===
==== Northwest Conference ====
Washington was a charter member of the short-lived Northwest Intercollegiate Athletic Association in 1902. Coach James Knight's teams finished the 1902 and 1903 seasons perfect in intercollegiate play, topping the NIAA standings.

Washington coach Gil Dobie won 9 consecutive Northwest Conference championships from 1908–1916.

The university held dual conference membership after co-founding the Pacific Coast Conference for 1916. Washington withdrew from the Northwest Conference for the 1919–1921 seasons, but rejoined in 1922 and remained a member until the conference folded following the 1925 season.

Coach Enoch Bagshaw won three additional Northwest Conference championships, with the 1925 team also winning the PCC.

Season	Conference	Coach	Conference record	Overall record
1902	NIAA	James Knight	4–0–0	5–1–0
1903	NIAA	James Knight	5–0–0	6–1–0
1908	Northwest Conference	Gil Dobie	3–0–1	6–0–1
1909†	Northwest Conference	Gil Dobie	4–0–0	7–0–0
1910	Northwest Conference	Gil Dobie	4–0–0	6–0–0
1911	Northwest Conference	Gil Dobie	4–0–0	7–0–0
1912	Northwest Conference	Gil Dobie	4–0–0	6–0–0
1913	Northwest Conference	Gil Dobie	4–0–0	7–0–0
1914	Northwest Conference	Gil Dobie	3–0–1	6–0–1
1915†	Northwest Conference	Gil Dobie	1–0–0	7–0–0
1916†	Northwest Conference	Gil Dobie	2–0–1	6–0–1
1922†	Northwest Conference	Enoch Bagshaw	4–0–1	6–1–1
1923	Northwest Conference	Enoch Bagshaw	6–0–0	10–1–1
1925†	Northwest Conference	Enoch Bagshaw	5–0–0	11–0–1

† Co-champions

==== Pac-12 Conference ====
Washington's 1925 team won the Edgar B. Schwabacher Perpetual Trophy as champions of the Pacific Coast Conference.

Washington won 18 conference championships included in the history of the Pac-12 Conference, including the inaugural Pacific Coast Conference championship in 1916. This total includes four PCC, three AAWU, one Pac-8, seven Pac-10, and three Pac-12 titles, and at least one in every decade except the 1940s. Washington's 18 conference championships is second in league history, behind USC's 38 as of 2018.

Season	Conference	Coach	Conference record	Overall record
1916†	PCC	Gil Dobie	3–0–1	6–0–1
1919†	PCC	Claude J. Hunt	2–1–0	5–1–0
1925	PCC	Enoch Bagshaw	5–0–0	10–1–1
1936	PCC	James Phelan	7–0–1	7–2–1
1959†	AAWU	Jim Owens	3–1–0	10–1–0
1960	AAWU	Jim Owens	4–0–0	10–1–0
1963	AAWU	Jim Owens	4–1–0	6–5–0
1977	Pacific-8	Don James	6–1–0	10–2–0
1980	Pacific-10	Don James	6–1–0	9–3–0
1981	Pacific-10	Don James	6–2–0	10–2–0
1990	Pacific-10	Don James	7–1–0	10–2–0
1991	Pacific-10	Don James	8–0–0	12–0–0
1992†	Pacific-10	Don James	6–2–0	9–3–0
1995†	Pacific-10	Jim Lambright	6–1–1	7–4–1
2000†	Pacific-10	Rick Neuheisel	7–1	11–1
2016	Pac-12	Chris Petersen	8–1	12–2
2018	Pac-12	Chris Petersen	7–2	10–4
2023	Pac-12	Kalen DeBoer	9–0	14–1

† Co-champions

=== Division championships ===
Washington won four Pac-12 North Division titles. Divisions were introduced in 2011 and were eliminated following the 2021 season.

Season	Conference	Division	Coach	Opponent	CG result
2016	Pac-12	North	Chris Petersen	Colorado	W 41–10
2017†	Pac-12	North	Chris Petersen	N/A: lost tiebreaker to Stanford	
2018†	Pac-12	North	Chris Petersen	Utah	W 10–3
2020	Pac-12	North	Jimmy Lake	N/A: unable to participate due to having insufficient players available	

† Co-champions

== Head coaches ==
Tenure	Season	Head coach	Record	Bowl record
1892–1893	2	W. B. Goodwin	2–4–1	
1894	1	Charles Cobb	1–1–1	
1895–1896, 1898	2, 1	Ralph Nichols	7–4–1	
1897	1	Carl L. Clemans	1–2	
1899	1	A. S. Jeffs	4–1–1	
1900	1	J. S. Dodge	1–2–2	
1901	1	Jack Wright	3–3	
1902–1904	3	James Knight	15–4–1	
1905	1	Oliver Cutts	4–2–2	
1906–1907	2	Victor M. Place	8–5–6	
1908–1916	9	Gil Dobie†	58–0–3	
1917, 1919	1, 1	Claude J. Hunt	6–3–1	
1918	1	Tony Savage	1–1	
1920	1	Stub Allison	1–5	
1921–1929	9	Enoch Bagshaw	63–22–6	0–1–1
1930–1941	12	James Phelan†	65–37–8	1–1
1942–1947	6	Ralph Welch	27–20–3	0–1
1948–1952	5	Howie Odell	23–25–2	
1953–1955	3	John Cherberg	10–18–2	
1956	1	Darrell Royal†	5–5	
1957–1974	18	Jim Owens†	99–82–6	2–1
1975–1992	18	Don James†	153–57–2	10–4
1993–1998	6	Jim Lambright	44–25–1	1–3
1999–2002	4	Rick Neuheisel	33–16	1–3
2003–2004	2	Keith Gilbertson	7–16	
2005–2008	4	Tyrone Willingham	11–37	
2009–2013	4.5	Steve Sarkisian	34–29	1–2
2013 (interim)	.5	Marques Tuiasosopo	1–0	1–0
2014–2019	6	Chris Petersen	55–26	2–4
2020–2021	1.5	Jimmy Lake	7–6	
2021 (interim)	.5	Bob Gregory	0–3^{*}	
2022–2023	2	Kalen DeBoer	25–3	2–1
2024–present	2	Jedd Fisch	15-11	1-1

† College Football Hall of Fame inductee
^{*} Includes loss to Arizona State during Head Coach Jimmy Lake's suspension.

== Bowl games ==
Washington has a bowl game record of 20–20–1 through the 2022 season, though the Poi Bowl game was not sanctioned by the NCAA. The Huskies' 15 Rose Bowl appearances are second only to USC in the Pac-12 while their seven victories are tied for third-most. In addition, Washington is also in an elite group of only seven schools to make three consecutive appearances in the Rose Bowl, a feat they accomplished in 1990–1992. The Pacific-8 did not allow a second bowl team from the conference until 1975.

No.	Season	Bowl	Location	Opponent	Result	Attendance
1	1923	Rose	Pasadena, California	Navy	T 14–14	40,000
2	1925	Rose	Pasadena, California	Alabama	L 19–20	45,000
3	1936	Rose	Pasadena, California	Pittsburgh	L 0–21	87,196
4	1937	Poi	Honolulu, Hawai'i	Hawaii	W 53–13	13,500
5	1943	Rose	Pasadena, California	USC	L 0–29	68,000
6	1959	Rose	Pasadena, California	Wisconsin	W 44–8	100,809
7	1960	Rose	Pasadena, California	Minnesota	W 17–7	97,314
8	1963	Rose	Pasadena, California	Illinois	L 7–17	96,957
9	1977	Rose	Pasadena, California	Michigan	W 27–20	105,312
10	1979	Sun	El Paso, Texas	Texas	W 14–7	33,412
11	1980	Rose	Pasadena, California	Michigan	L 6–23	104,863
12	1981	Rose	Pasadena, California	Iowa	W 28–0	105,611
13	1982	Aloha	Honolulu, Hawai'i	Maryland	W 21–20	30,055
14	1983	Aloha	Honolulu, Hawai'i	Penn State	L 10–13	37,212
15	1984	Orange	Miami, Florida	Oklahoma	W 28–17	56,294
16	1985	Freedom	Anaheim, California	Colorado	W 20–17	30,961
17	1986	Sun	El Paso, Texas	Alabama	L 6–28	48,722
18	1987	Independence	Shreveport, Louisiana	Tulane	W 24–12	41,683
19	1989	Freedom	Anaheim, California	Florida	W 34–7	33,858
20	1990	Rose	Pasadena, California	Iowa	W 46–34	101,273
21	1991	Rose	Pasadena, California	Michigan	W 34–14	103,566
22	1992	Rose	Pasadena, California	Michigan	L 31–38	94,236
23	1995	Sun	El Paso, Texas	Iowa	L 18–38	49,116
24	1996	Holiday	San Diego, California	Colorado	L 21–33	54,749
25	1997	Aloha	Honolulu, Hawai'i	Michigan State	W 51–23	34,419
26	1998	Oahu	Honolulu, Hawai'i	Air Force	L 25–45	46,451
27	1999	Holiday	San Diego, California	Kansas State	L 20–24	57,118
28	2000	Rose	Pasadena, California	Purdue	W 34–24	94,392
29	2001	Holiday	San Diego, California	Texas	L 43–47	60,548
30	2002	Sun	El Paso, Texas	Purdue	L 24–34	48,917
31	2010	Holiday	San Diego, California	Nebraska	W 19–7	57,921
32	2011	Alamo	San Antonio, Texas	Baylor	L 56–67	65,256
33	2012	Las Vegas	Whitney, Nevada	Boise State	L 26–28	33,217
34	2013	Fight Hunger	San Francisco, California	BYU	W 31–16	34,136
35	2014	Cactus	Tempe, Arizona	Oklahoma State	L 22–30	35,409
36	2015	Heart of Dallas	Dallas, Texas	Southern Miss	W 44–31	20,229
37	2016	Peach (CFP Semifinal) †	Atlanta, Georgia	Alabama	L 7–24	75,996
38	2017	Fiesta †	Glendale, Arizona	Penn State	L 28–35	61,842
39	2018	Rose †	Pasadena, California	Ohio State	L 23–28	91,853
40	2019	Las Vegas	Whitney, Nevada	Boise State	W 38–7	34,197
41	2022	Alamo	San Antonio, Texas	Texas	W 27–20	62,730
42	2023	Sugar (CFP Semifinal) †	New Orleans, Louisiana	Texas	W 37–31	68,791
43	2023	2024 CFP National Championship †	Houston, Texas	Michigan	L 13–34	72,808
44	2024	Sun	El Paso, Texas	Louisville	L 34–35	40,826
45	2025	LA	Inglewood, California	Boise State	W 38–10	23,269

† New Year's Six/CFP game

== Program records ==
=== College Football Playoff ===
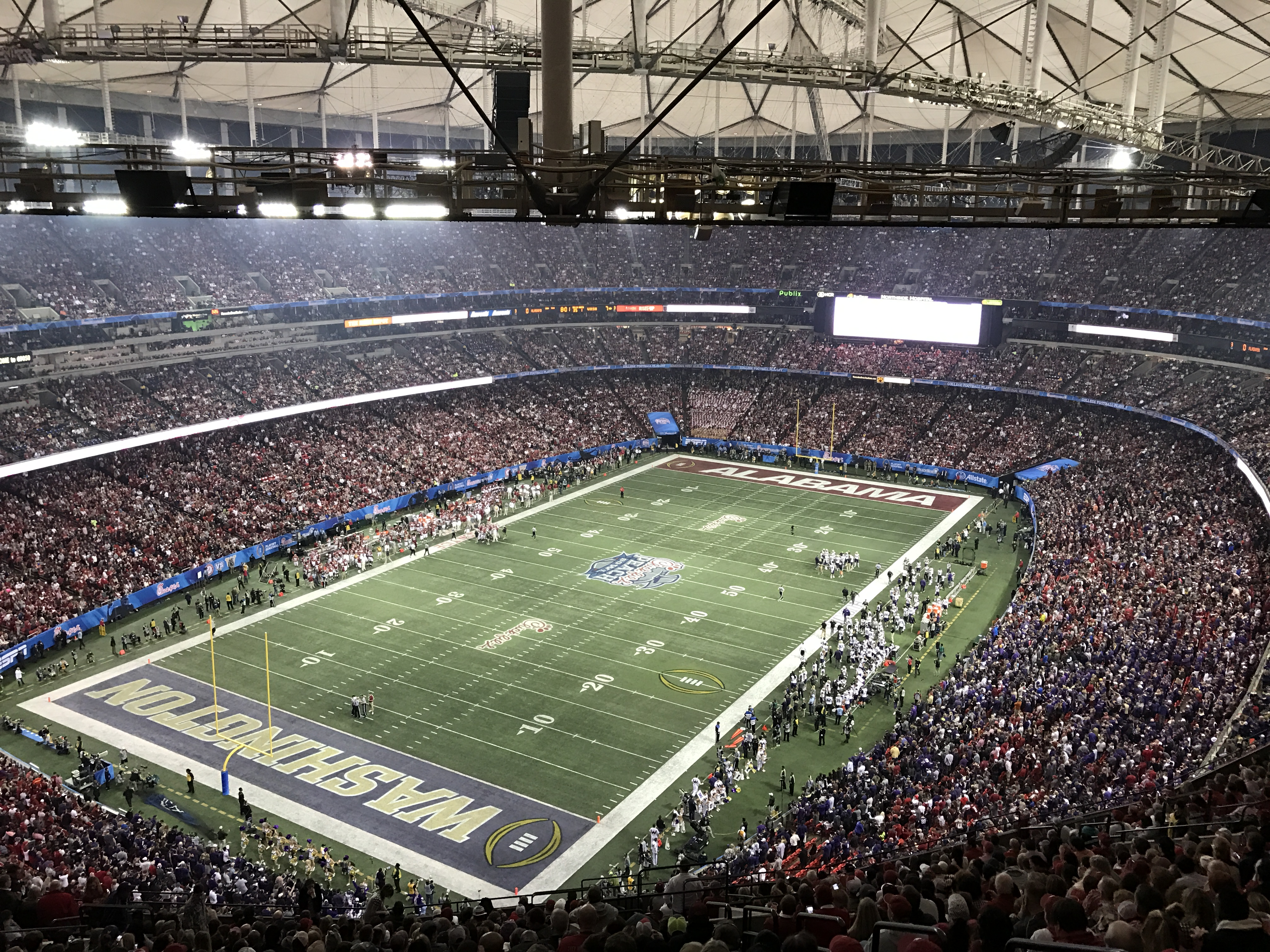
Washington's first appearance in the College Football Playoff; the 2016 Peach Bowl at the Georgia Dome

Washington has made two appearances in the College Football Playoff.

Year	Seed	Opponent	Round	Result
2016	4	No. 1 Alabama	Semifinal – Peach Bowl	L 7–24
2023	2	No. 3 Texas	Semifinal – Sugar Bowl	W 37–31
2023	2	No. 1 Michigan	Finals – CFP National Championship	L 34–13

=== All-time record vs. legacy Pac-12 opponents ===
As of December 3, 2023, Washington's records against conference opponents were as follows.

Opponent	Won	Lost	Tied	Percentage	Streak	First meeting
Arizona	26	11	1	.697	Won 7	1978
Arizona State	18	22	0	.450	Won 1	1975
California	57	41	4	.578	Won 3	1904
Colorado	13	7	1	.643	Won 1	1915
Oregon	63	48	5	.565	Won 3	1900
Oregon State	69	35	4	.657	Won 2	1897
USC	31	52	4	.379	Won 2	1923
Stanford	46	44	4	.511	Won 3	1893
UCLA	33	41	2	.447	Lost 2	1932
Utah	14	2	0	.875	Won 2	1931
Washington State	76	33	6	.687	Won 2	1900
Totals	445	335	31	.568		

== Rivalries ==
=== Oregon ===
Washington and Oregon first met in 1900. The Cascade Clash or the Fight For The Forest, as it is informally known to some, is an American college football rivalry between the Oregon Ducks and Washington Huskies of the Big Ten Conference. The respective campuses in Eugene and Seattle are 285 miles (460 km) apart, via Interstate 5.

It is one of the top 25 most played rivalries in NCAA Division I FBS history, and has been played regularly since 1900.

From 2004 until 2016, Oregon won 12 consecutive matchups against the Huskies, the longest streak by either team in the series. However, Washington leads the series all time with a record of 63–49–5 as of 2024.

=== Washington State ===
Washington and Washington State first played each other in 1900. Traditionally, the Apple Cup is the final game of the regular season for both teams. The Apple Cup trophy has been presented to the winner of the game by the state's governor since 1963. Washington leads the series 76–34–6 as of the 2024 season.

Since the departure of Washington, Oregon, USC, and UCLA from the Pac-12, Washington State has become an out-of-conference opponent. This has led to Oregon replacing Washington State as the Huskies' final game of the year, and current scheduling has established that the Apple Cup will be played within the first 3 games of the year, before Washington begins their nine-game Big 10 conference schedule.

=== Northwest Championship ===
Washington wins the Northwest Championship by sweeping Oregon State, Oregon, and Washington State. The four Pacific Northwest rivals began playing in a round-robin format in the 1903 season.

Recent conference realignment has made this particular feat difficult for any of the Northwest schools to accomplish, given that Washington & Oregon and Washington State & Oregon State now reside in two separate conferences, the Big 10 and Pac-12, respectively.

== Facilities ==
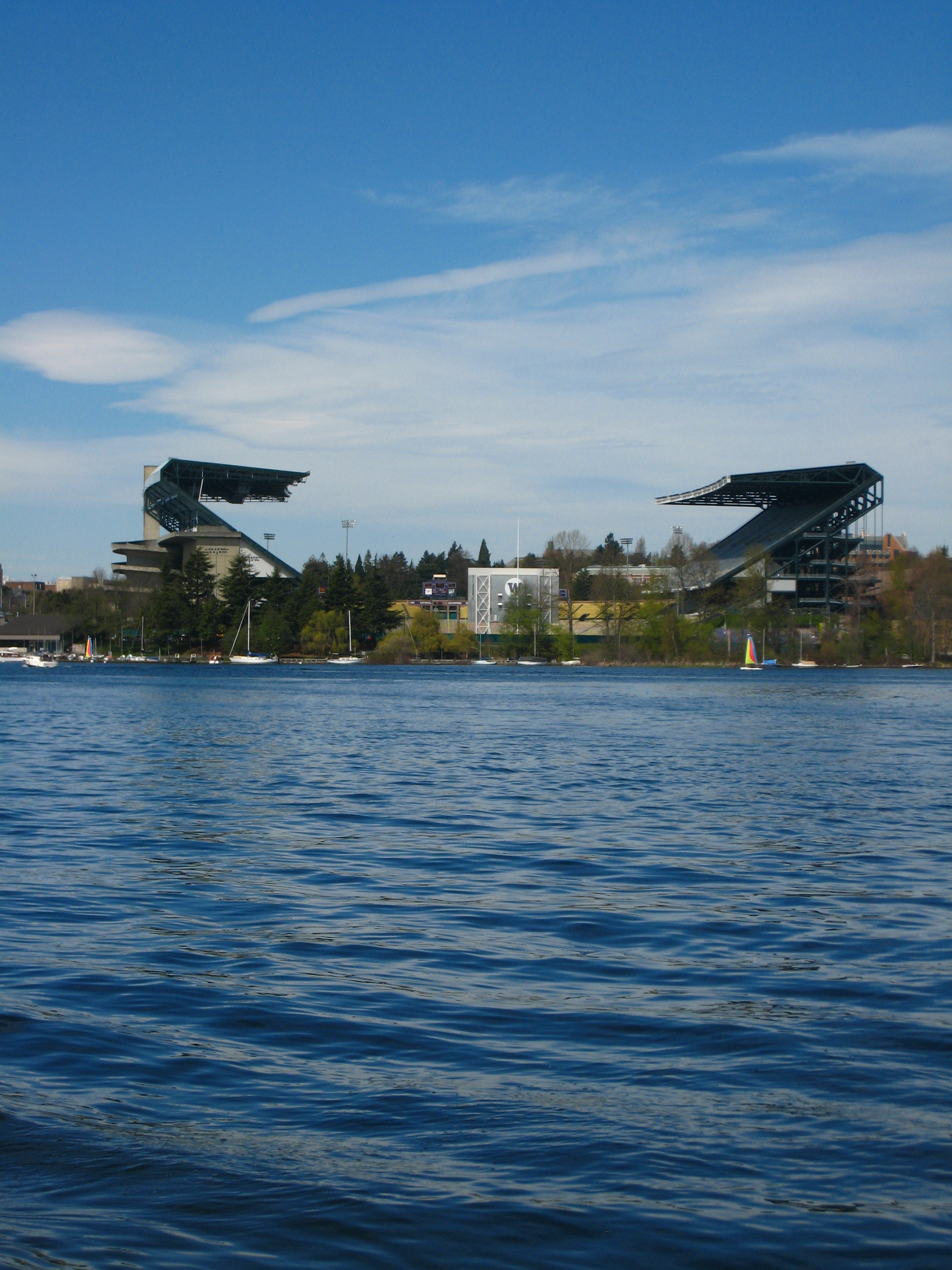
Husky Stadium is one of the loudest college football stadiums in the country

=== Husky Stadium ===
Husky Stadium has served as the home football stadium for Washington since 1920, with renovations in 1950, 1987 and 2012. Located on campus and set next to Lake Washington, it is the largest stadium in the Pacific Northwest with a seating capacity of 70,183. The stadium is one of a few football stadiums in the United States accessible through water, and is known as the "Greatest Setting in College Football". Washington has led the modern Pac-10 Conference in game attendance 13 times, including nine consecutive seasons from 1989 to 1997.

With nearly 70 percent of the seats located between the end zones and grandstands covered by cantilevered metal roofs, Husky Stadium is one of the loudest stadiums in the country and is the loudest recorded stadium in college football. During the 1992 night game against the Nebraska Cornhuskers, ESPN measured the noise level at about 135 decibels, the loudest mark in NCAA history.

In 1968 the Huskies became the first major collegiate team to install an Astroturf field, following the lead of the Astrodome. Prior to the 2000 season, the school was among the leaders adopting FieldTurf, trailing only Memorial Stadium's installation by one season.

A $280 million renovation of Husky Stadium began on November 7, 2011. Home games were moved to CenturyLink Field for the 2012 season while construction took place. The newly renovated Husky Stadium reopened on August 31, 2013 in a game in which the Huskies defeated Boise State by a score of 38–6.

=== Dempsey Indoor ===
The Dempsey Indoor is an 80,000-square-foot (7,400 m^{2}) facility opened in September 2001. The building is used as an indoor practice facility for Washington's football, softball, baseball and men's and women's soccer teams.

== Traditions ==
=== Logos and uniforms ===
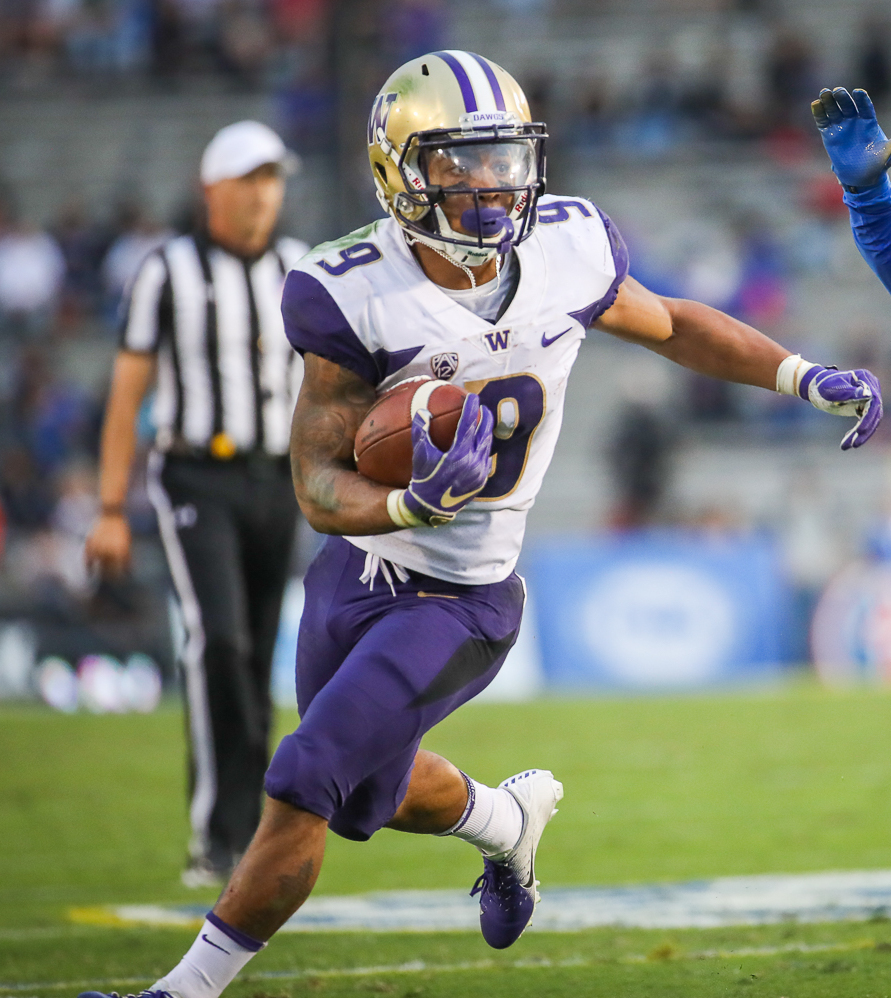
Washington's traditional colors are purple and gold. (Pictured: Myles Gaskin)

Washington has worn variations of uniforms over the years but are most recognized for their traditional home uniform of gold helmets, purple jerseys, and gold pants.

Since Don James' first year as head coach in 1975, the Huskies have worn metallic gold helmets with a purple block "W" on both sides and white and purple center striping; he patterned the new helmet and uniforms after the San Francisco 49ers of the NFL. The exception was from 1995 to 1998 under Jim Lambright, when Washington wore solid purple helmets with a gold "W."

During Jim Owens' tenure, an outstanding defensive player was awarded the honor of wearing a purple helmet. Rick Redman, an All-American linebacker in the 1960s, wore one. It was rather intimidating for the opposing quarterback to stand behind his center and see this lone purple-helmeted player staring him down before each play. In 1973 and 1974, Owens' last two seasons, the entire team wore purple helmets.

For the 2010 home finale against UCLA, the Huskies unveiled a "blackout" theme. The end zones of Husky Stadium were painted black, while the team debuted black jerseys and pants and encouraged the home crowd to dress in black as well. Two weeks later for the Apple Cup in Pullman, UW wore the black pants with the usual white road jersey. Black jerseys and pants were worn again the next month for the 2010 Holiday Bowl. All three games were Washington victories.

In 2013, the Huskies debuted chrome gold helmets, worn with purple tops and bottoms in a rain-soaked match against Arizona. Later that season against Oregon, Washington debuted matte black helmets featuring a purple "W" and two truncated purple stripes.

Prior to the 2014 season, Washington revealed a new uniform set that featured three jersey, four pant, and three helmet color options to allow for a myriad of combinations on the field. The set included matte gold, matte black, and "frosted" white helmets; purple, white, and black jerseys; and gold, purple, white, and black pants. The chrome gold helmets that had been introduced the previous season returned in the 2014 game against Arizona State. In 2017, chrome purple helmets were added to the uniform set.

In April 2018, the school agreed to a new 10-year, $119 million apparel deal with Adidas set to begin in summer 2019, ending a 20-year partnership with Nike. The deal with Adidas will rank among the top-10 most valuable in college athletics.

=== Marching Band ===
The University of Washington Husky Marching Band (HMB) is the marching band of the University of Washington, consisting of 240 members. The 2026 season is the 97th for the HMB.

=== Broadcasting ===
Huskies games are broadcast statewide on the Washington Sports Network, with Tony Castricone as the play-by-play announcer and former UW tight end Cam Cleeland on color commentary. The games air on flagship station 93.3 KJR-FM in Seattle. Bob Rondeau, known as the "Voice of the Huskies," announced Washington football for over 30 years until his retirement in 2017.

Lou Gellermann, a Husky Hall of Fame rower, served as the UW Football public address announcer from 1985 until 2007. Gellermann welcomed Husky Stadium fans with his signature greeting "Hello, Dawg fans!", to which the fans responded "Hello, Lou!".

== Individual awards and accomplishments ==
=== Individual national award winners ===
Players

Paul Hornung Award Most Versatile Player	Maxwell Award Best All Around Player	Academic All-American of the Year Top Student-Athlete
2014 – Shaq Thompson, LB	2023 – Michael Penix Jr., QB	2023 – Rome Odunze, WR

Doak Walker Award Premier Running Back	John Mackey Award Most Outstanding Tight End	Joe Moore Award Best Offensive Line
1990 – Greg Lewis, TB	2013 – Austin Seferian-Jenkins, TE	2023

Lombardi Award Best Lineman/Linebacker	Outland Trophy Best Interior Lineman	Bill Willis Award Top Defensive Lineman
1991 – Steve Emtman, DT	1991 – Steve Emtman, DT	1991 – Steve Emtman, DT

Coaches

Paul "Bear" Bryant Award Coach of the Year	Home Depot Coach of the Year	Sporting News Coach of the Year	AP Coach of the Year
1991 – Don James	2023 – Kalen DeBoer	2023 – Kalen DeBoer	2023 – Kalen DeBoer

Eddie Robinson Coach of the Year	UPI Pacific Coast Coach of the Year
2023 – Kalen DeBoer	1959, 1960 – Jim Owens

=== Individual conference award winners ===
Players

Pac-12 Player of the Year Offensive	Pat Tillman Player of the Year Pac-12 Defensive	Morris Trophy Pac-12 Lineman of the Year
1977† – Warren Moon, QB; 1983 – Steve Pelluer, QB; 1990 – Greg Lewis, RB; 1991 – Mario Bailey, SE; 2000 – Marques Tuiasosopo, QB; 2016 – Jake Browning, QB	1990–91 – Steve Emtman, DT; 1992 – Dave Hoffmann, LB; 1996 – Jason Chorak, DL; 2017 – Vita Vea, DT; 2018 – Ben Burr-Kirven, LB	1981 – Fletcher Jenkins, DT; 1984 – Ron Holmes, DT; 1986 – Reggie Rogers, DT; 1989 – Bern Brostek, C 1990–91 – Steve Emtman, DT; 1991–92 – Lincoln Kennedy, OT; 1993 – D'Marco Farr, DT; 1996 – Bob Sapp, OT; 1997 – Olin Kreutz, C 2000 – Chad Ward, OG; 2017 – Vita Vea, DT; 2018 – Kaleb McGary, OT; 2018 – Greg Gaines, DT; 2023 – Troy Fautanu, OT

† Warren Moon shared Pac-8 Player of the Year with Guy Benjamin in 1977 before Offensive and Defensive Players awards were named in 1983

Coaches

Pac-10 Coach of the Year	Pac-12 Coach of the Year
1980, 1990–91 – Don James	2022-23 – Kalen DeBoer

== Notable players ==
=== Heisman Trophy voting ===
As of December 2023, eight Washington players have ranked among top finishers in the Heisman Trophy voting.

Year	Name	Position	Finish
1951	Hugh McElhenny†	HB	8th
1952	Don Heinrich†	QB	9th
1990	Greg Lewis	RB	7th
1991	Steve Emtman†	DE	4th
1994	Napoleon Kaufman	RB	9th
2000	Marques Tuiasosopo	QB	8th
2016	Jake Browning	QB	6th
2022	Michael Penix Jr.	QB	8th
2023	Michael Penix Jr.	QB	2nd

† College Football Hall of Fame inductee

=== Consensus All-Americans ===
23 different Washington players have been recognized on 24 occasions as consensus All-Americans by the National Collegiate Athletic Association (NCAA), by virtue of recording a majority of votes at their respective positions by the selectors.

- 1925 – George Wilson
- 1928 – Chuck Carroll
- 1936 – Max Starcevich
- 1940 – Rudy Mucha
- 1941 – Ray Frankowski
- 1963, 1964 – Rick Redman
- 1966 – Tom Greenlee
- 1968 – Al Worley
- 1982 – Chuck Nelson †
- 1984 – Ron Holmes
- 1986 – Jeff Jaeger and Reggie Rogers
- 1991 – Steve Emtman † and Mario Bailey
- 1992 – Lincoln Kennedy †
- 1995 – Lawyer Milloy †
- 1996 – Benji Olson †
- 1997 – Olin Kreutz
- 2002 – Reggie Williams
- 2014 – Hau'oli Kikaha
- 2016 – Budda Baker
- 2017 – Dante Pettis
- 2023 – Rome Odunze

† Unanimous selection

=== Honored numbers ===
Washington Football honors three jersey numbers. As of 2022 all three honored numbers are available for reissue, although each had been considered "retired" in previous years. The three players and their numbers are honored on a prominent display situated on the lower concourse of Husky Stadium.

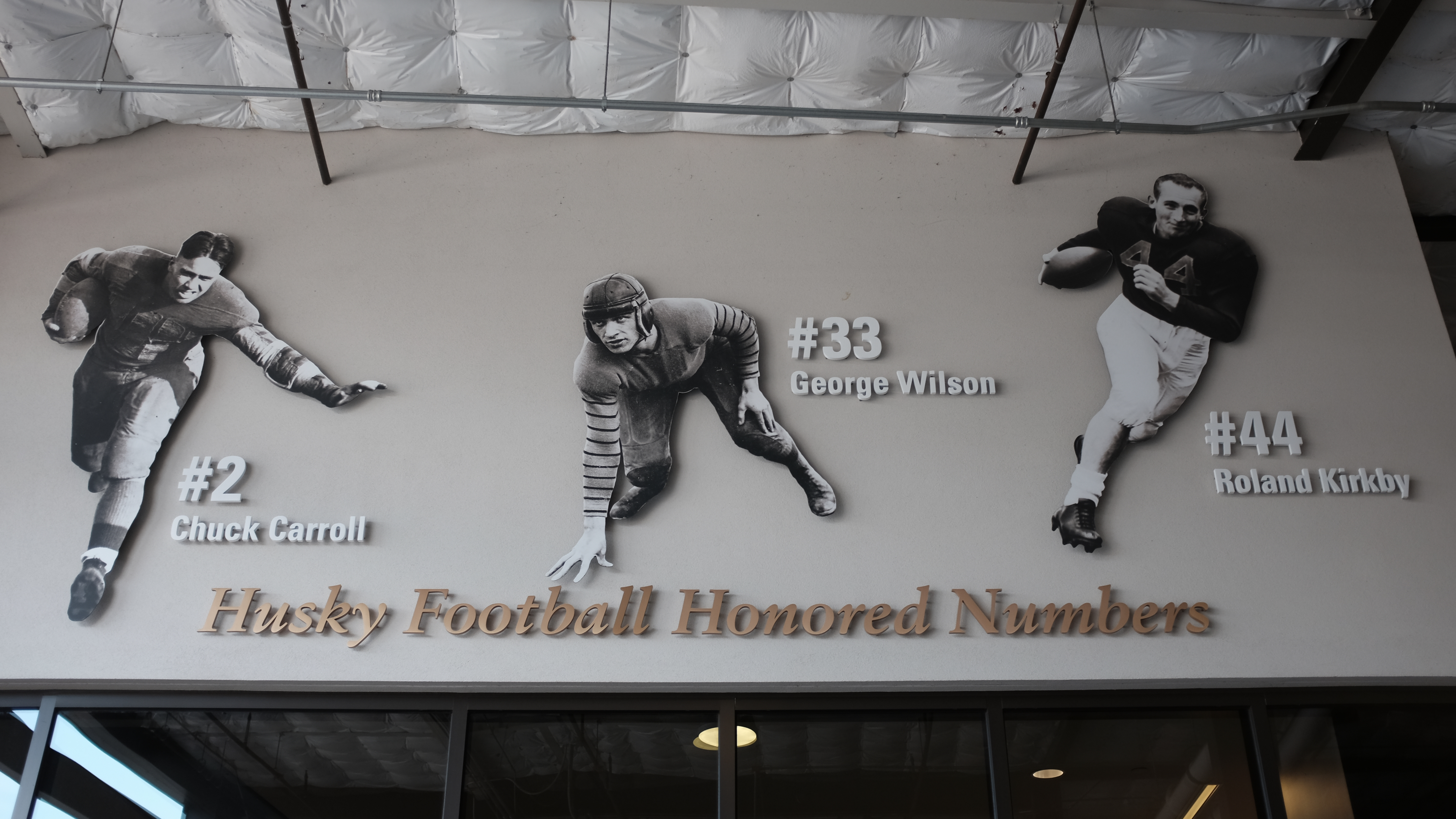
Honored numbers at Husky Stadium in April 2022

Washington Huskies honored numbers
No.	Player	Pos.	Tenure
2	Chuck Carroll †	HB	1927–1928
33	Wildcat Wilson †	HB	1923–1925
44	Roland Kirkby	HB	1948–1950

† College Football Hall of Fame inductee

=== College Football Hall of Fame ===
The former Washington players and coaches in the table below have been inducted into the College Football Hall of Fame, located in Atlanta, Georgia.

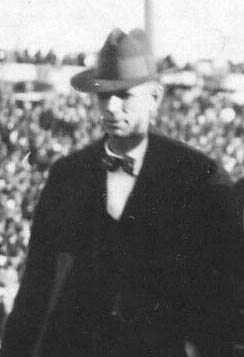
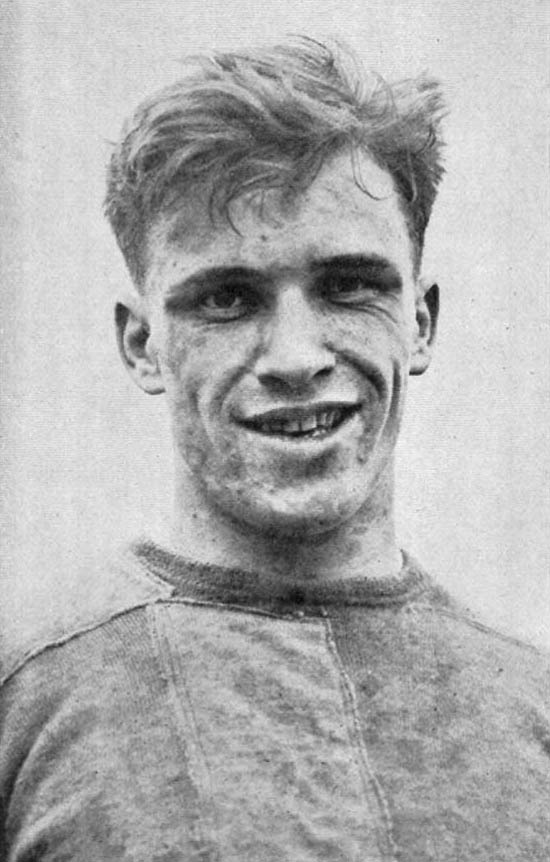
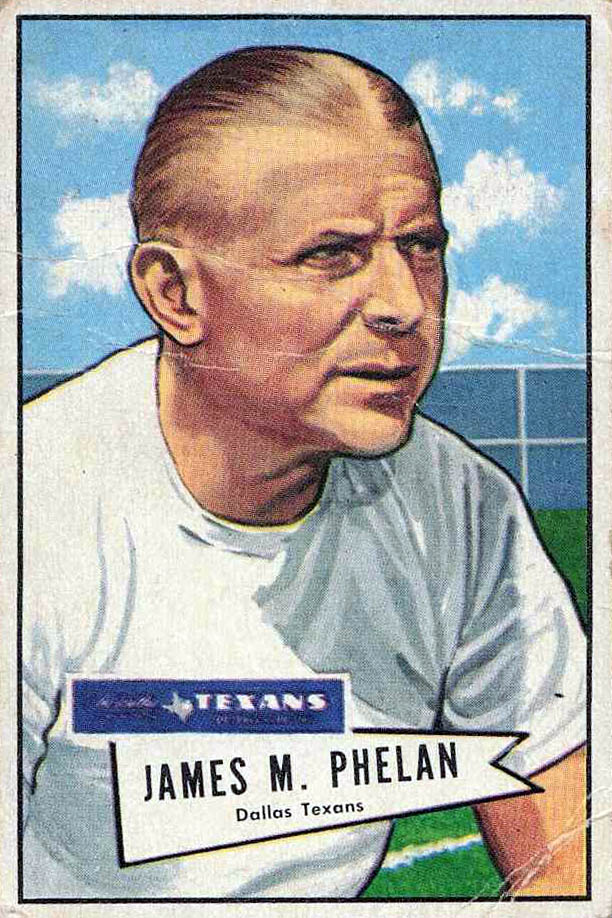
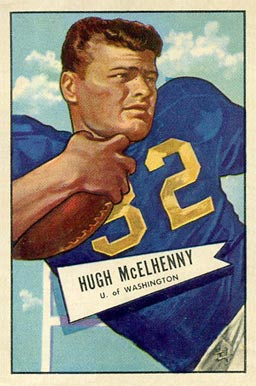
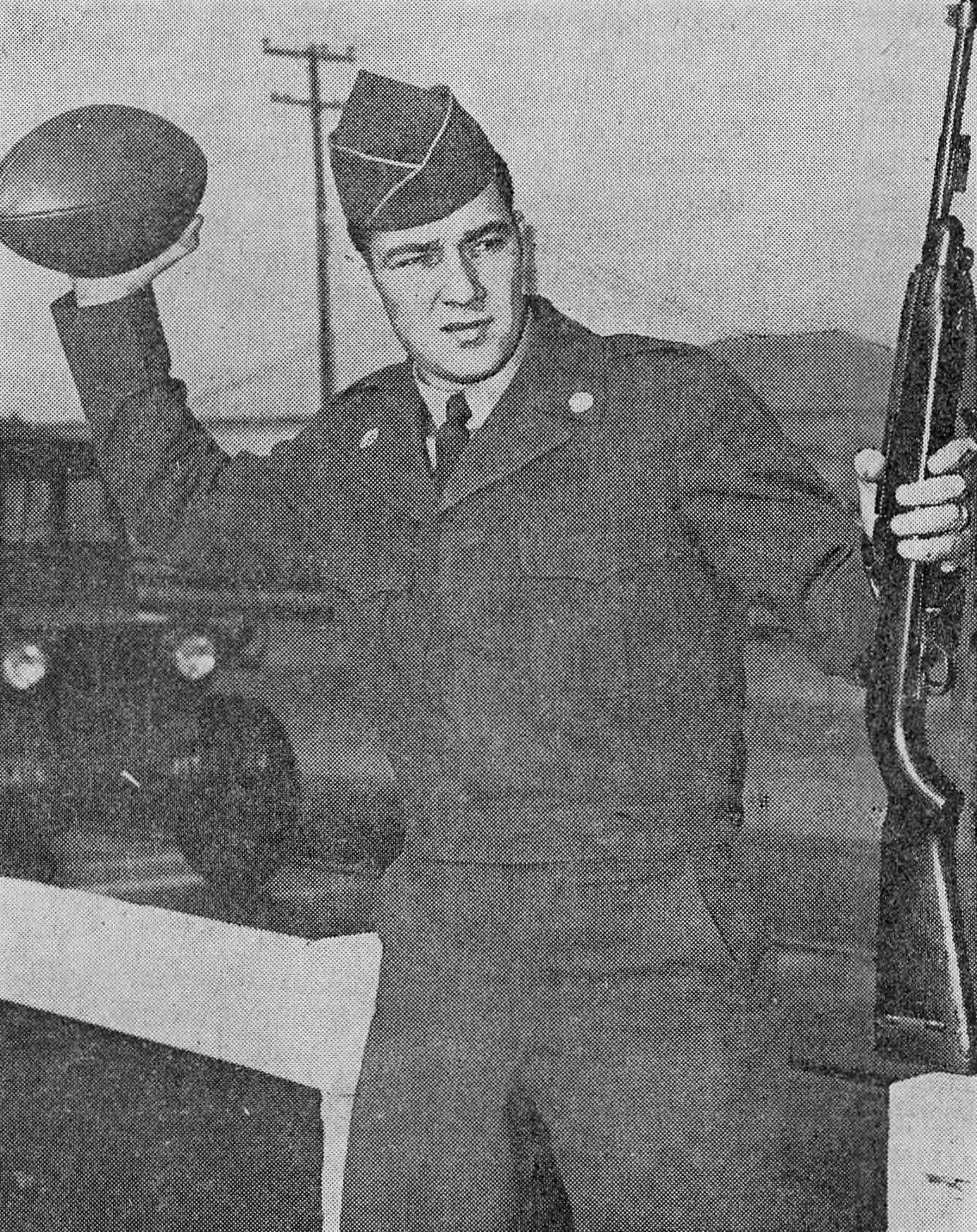
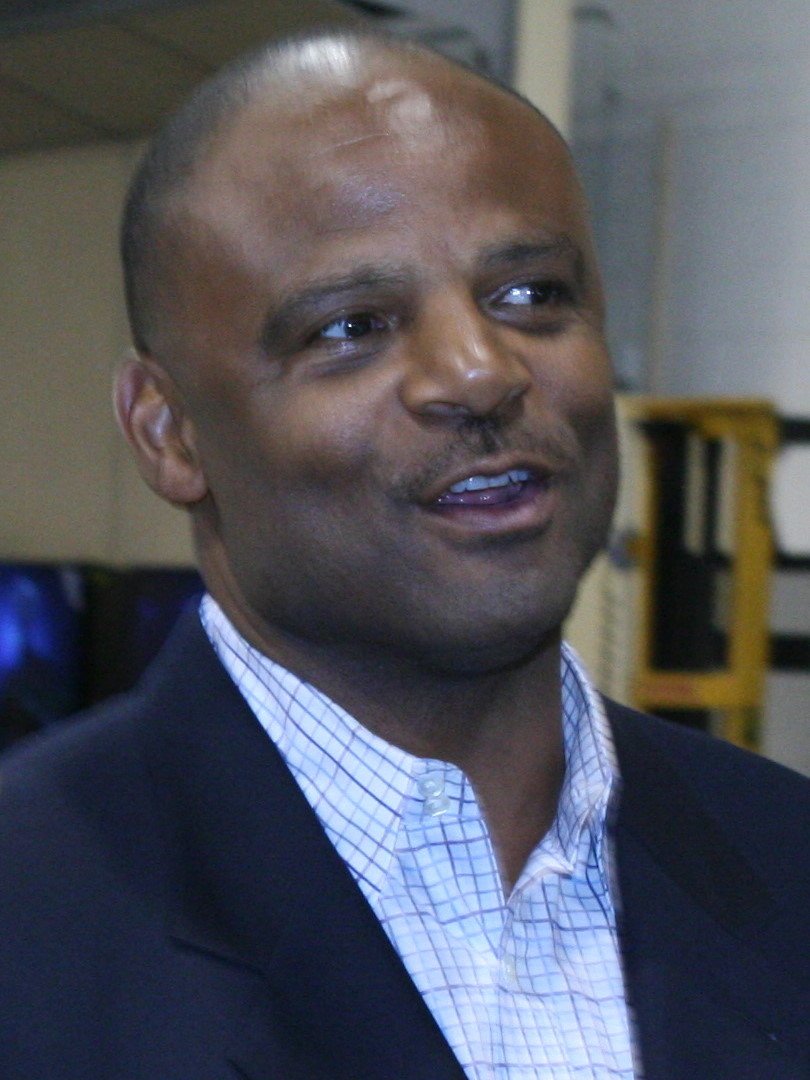
Fltr (above): Gil Dobie, Wildcat Wilson, James Phelan; (below): Hugh McElhenny, Don Heinrich, and Warren Moon, Hall of Fame inductees

Name	Position	Tenure	Inducted	Ref.
Gil Dobie	Coach	1908–1916	1951	
George Wilson	HB	1923–1925	1951	
Chuck Carroll	HB	1926–1928	1964	
Paul Schwegler	T	1929–1931	1967	
James Phelan	Coach	1930–1941	1973	
Vic Markov	T	1935–1937	1976	
Hugh McElhenny	HB	1949–1951	1981	
Jim Owens	Coach	1957-1974	1982	
Darrell Royal	Coach	1956	1983	
Don Heinrich	QB	1949–1950, 1952	1987	
Bob Schloredt	QB	1958–1960	1989	
Max Starcevich	G	1934–1936	1990	
Rick Redman	G / LB	1962–1964	1995	
Don James	Coach	1975–1992	1997	
Steve Emtman	DT	1989–1991	2006	
Lincoln Kennedy	OT	1989–1992	2015	
Olin Kreutz	C	1995–1997	2026	
Chris Petersen	Coach	2014–2019	2026	

=== Pro Football Hall of Fame ===
Four former Washington players have been inducted into the Pro Football Hall of Fame, located in Canton, Ohio.

Name	Position	Career	Inducted
Hugh McElhenny	HB	1949–1951	1970
Arnie Weinmeister	DT	1942, 1946–1947	1984
Warren Moon	QB	1975–1977	2006
Don Coryell	Coach	1949	2023

=== Canadian Football Hall of Fame ===
As of 2010, Warren Moon (Edmonton Eskimos 1978–83) is the only player to be a member of both the Canadian Football Hall of Fame and the Pro Football Hall of Fame (NFL).

Name	Position	Career	Inducted	Ref.
Tom Scott	SB	1969–1972	1998	
Warren Moon	QB	1975–1977	2001	

=== Rose Bowl Hall of Fame ===
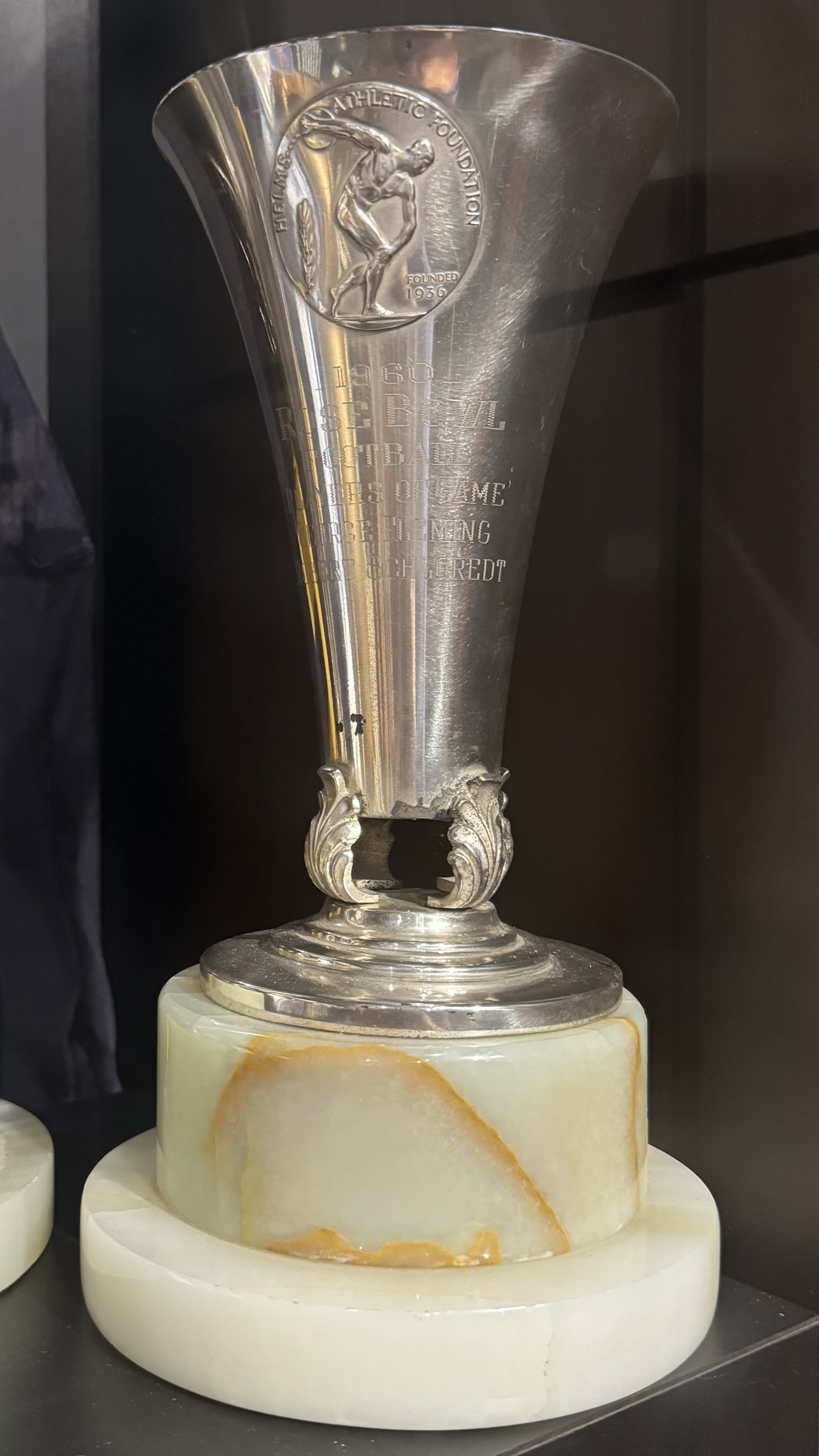
1960 Rose Bowl Player of the Game trophy, presented by the Helms Athletic Foundation to George Fleming and Bob Schloredt.

The Rose Bowl has inducted eight Washington coaches and players into the Rose Bowl Game Hall of Fame.

Name	Position	Tenure	Inducted
Bob Schloredt	QB	1958–60	1991
George Wilson	HB	1923–25	1991
Jim Owens	Head coach	1957–74	1992
Don James	Head coach	1975–92	1994
Warren Moon	QB	1975–77	1997
Steve Emtman	DT	1988–91	2006
George Fleming	HB	1958–61	2011
Mark Brunell	QB	1988–92	2015

=== Notable in other fields ===
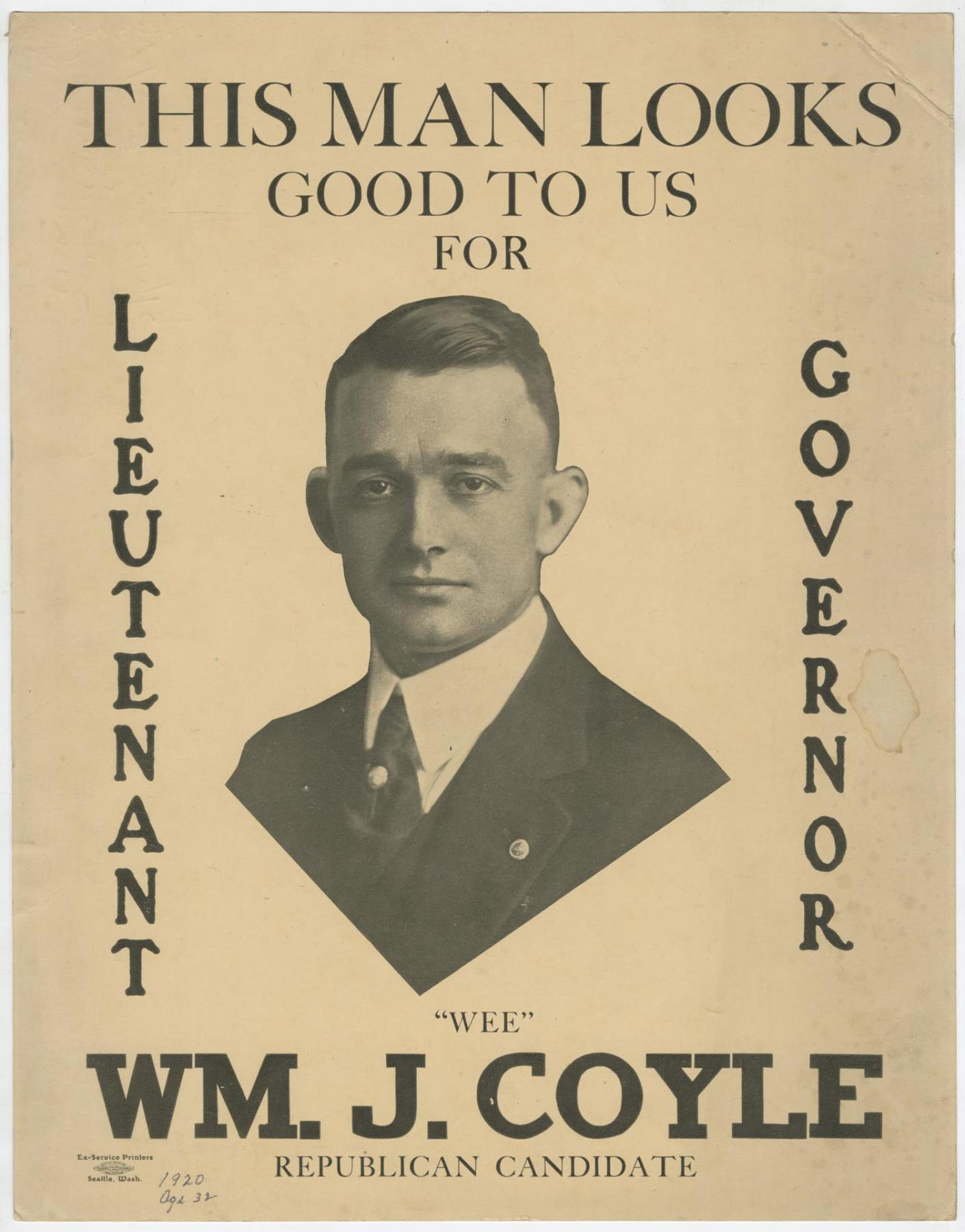
Campaign poster for William J. Coyle, former quarterback and captain of the Washington football team.

Name	Position	Tenure	Occupation
Ralph Nichols	Guard	1892–94	State Senator, Seattle City Council member
John Cherberg	Halfback	1930–32	13th Lieutenant Governor of Washington
William J. Coyle	Quarterback	1908–11	8th Lieutenant Governor of Washington
Jim Ferrell	Outside linebacker	1985–88	Mayor of Federal Way
Bruce Harrell	Linebacker	1976–79	Mayor of Seattle
Joel McHale	Tight end	1992–93	Actor/comedian
Nate Robinson	Cornerback	2002	NBA player

== Memorable games ==
=== 1975 Apple Cup ===
In the 1975 Apple Cup, Washington State led 27–14 with three minutes left in the game. WSU attempted a 4th-and-1 conversion at the UW 14-yard line rather than try for a field goal. The resulting pass was intercepted by Al Burleson and returned 93 yards for a touchdown. After a WSU three-and-out, Warren Moon's tipped pass was caught by Spider Gaines for a 78-yard touchdown reception and sealed a dramatic 28–27 win for Washington. WSU Head Coach Jim Sweeney resigned a week later, leaving with a 26–59–1 record.

=== 1981 Apple Cup ===
When 14th-ranked Washington State and 17th-ranked Washington met in the 1981 Apple Cup, it was billed as the biggest meeting in the series since the 1936 game when the winner was invited to the Rose Bowl. Washington's defense was the best in the conference, while the Cougars ranked high in offensive categories. Along with a win over WSU, the Huskies needed USC to upset UCLA, in a game that kicked off 40 minutes before the Apple Cup, to clear the way for a Rose Bowl bid.

With his team trailing 7–3 late in the second quarter, Husky quarterback Steve Pelluer fired a low pass towards wideout Paul Skansi. Washington State cornerback Nate Brady looked as if he would smother the ball when Skansi dove over the defender for a catch in the endzone.

Washington State drove the ball 69 yards to open the second half and tie the score at 10. From that point Washington, behind the fine play of their offensive line, took control. Ron "Cookie" Jackson capped an 80-yard drive by running 23 yards to put the Huskies ahead 17–10. Following a Cougar turnover, All-American kicker Chuck Nelson kicked his second field goal of the game to increase the Huskies' lead to 10 points.

The fate of the Cougars was sealed when the score of the USC-UCLA game was announced- the Trojans had engineered the upset. Nelson added a field goal with less than three minutes to play, and the Huskies were off to the Rose Bowl.

=== 1985 Orange Bowl ===
The 1984 Huskies were ranked No. 1 in October, but lost on November 10 to USC at the Coliseum. Although the Trojans would finish the regular season 8–3 and ranked No. 18, this head-to-head result won them the Pac-10 championship and knocked the 10–1 Huskies out of the Rose Bowl.

At the end of the regular season, the No. 4 Huskies were invited to play No. 1 BYU in the Holiday Bowl. They declined the invitation and instead accepted an offer to play No. 2 Oklahoma in the Orange Bowl, the first Pac-10 team to do so. The game in Miami versus the Big Eight champions was a more prestigious bowl and offered a more lucrative payout. Oklahoma, if they won their bowl game, was also expected to jump to No. 1 in the final rankings.

Don James was carried off the field on his players' shoulders with his finger held up indicating "No. 1", believing that this win would propel them to the national championship. Unfortunately for the Huskies, unbeaten BYU retained their first position in the final AP and Coaches polls despite playing a much weaker schedule.

=== 1990 – "All I Saw Was Purple" ===
Heading into the 1990 season, the winner of the USC-Washington game had gone to the Rose Bowl in 10 of the previous 13 seasons. The 1990 match would continue that trend. Washington's All-Centennial team was introduced at halftime of the game, while two members of the historic team, Hugh McElhenny and Nesby Glasgow, delivered inspirational talks to the current players. On a bright, sunny day with the temperature reaching 92 degrees Fahrenheit, the crowd of 72,617 witnessed one of the most memorable games in program history.

Washington shut out USC for just the third time in 23 seasons, handing the Trojans their worst conference defeat in 30 years. "Student Body Right" was held to only 28 rushing yards as the Husky defense dominated the line of scrimmage. Greg Lewis, the Doak Walker Award winner as the nation's top running back, gained 126 rushing yards as sophomore quarterback Mark Brunell threw for 197 yards for the Huskies, as they rolled to a 24–0 halftime lead.

The Husky defense, led by All-American lineman Steve Emtman, stopped everything the Trojans attempted. The defense would hold USC to 163 total yards and seven first downs for the game. They would record three sacks and put so much pressure on Todd Marinovich that after the game, weary and beaten, he famously said: "I just saw purple. That's all. No numbers, just purple."

=== 1992 – "A Night To Remember" ===
Playing in the first night in stadium history, No. 2 Washington posted a victory against No. 12 Nebraska that provided the loudest recorded moment in the history of Husky Stadium and would be dubbed "A Night To Remember."

Late in the first quarter, Husky punter John Werdel pinned Nebraska on its three yard-line. Crowd noise caused the Husker linemen to false start on consecutive plays, only adding to the frenzy of the crowd.

When Nebraska quarterback Mike Grant dropped back to his own end zone to attempt a pass, Husky roverback Tommie Smith blitzed Grant from his blind side and tackled him for a safety. The deafening roar following the play reverberated off the twin roofs of the stadium. ESPN measured the noise level at over 130 decibels, well above the threshold of pain. The peak recorded level of 133.6 decibels has been the highest ever recorded at a college football stadium.

Holding a 9–7 lead, the Husky offense went into quick-strike mode at the close of the second quarter. Speedy running back Napoleon Kaufman ended an 80-yard drive with a 1-yard scoring run. Walter Bailey intercepted Grant to start the second half, and the Huskies extended their lead when quarterback Billy Joe Hobert threw a 24-yard touchdown pass to a diving Joe Kralik to boost the lead to 23–7. Kicker Travis Hanson later made a pair of field goals second half to cinch a 29–14 win. The victory propelled Washington to the No. 1 ranking in the AP poll the following week.

=== 1994 – The "Whammy in Miami" ===
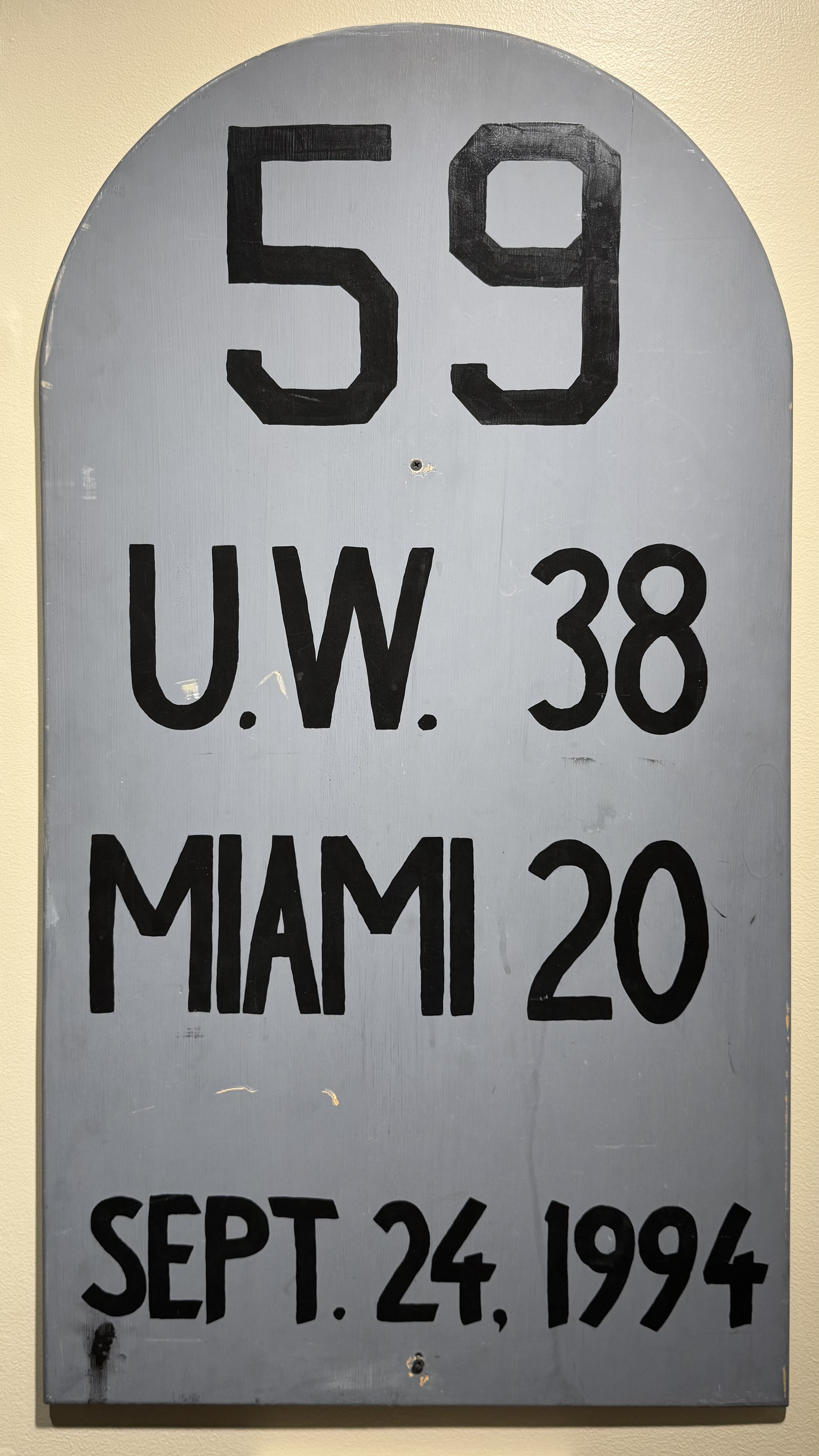
Tombstone showing the final score of the Whammy in Miami on display in the Husky Hall of Fame

The "Whammy in Miami" was a college football game played between the Huskies and the Miami Hurricanes on September 24, 1994 in Miami's Orange Bowl. The game was the first football contest between the two schools. During the 1991 season, both teams finished the year with identical 12–0 records and both teams were crowned National Champions by different polls. The teams were unable to settle the championship on the field, as both teams were locked into their respective bowl games (Washington in the Rose and Miami in the Orange). As a result, both schools agreed to schedule the other for a series of games.

Entering the game, Miami had an NCAA record home winning streak of 58 games and was ranked 5th in the nation with a 2–0 record. The Hurricanes had not lost at the Orange Bowl since 1985 and not to a team from outside of Florida since 1984. The Huskies were 1–1, having lost to USC and beaten Ohio State. Odds makers placed the Huskies as a 14-point underdog.

The Hurricanes appeared to be on their way to a 59th consecutive home victory in the first half, leading the Huskies 14–3 at halftime. After the half, the Huskies came out firing by scoring 22 points in five minutes. Key plays included a 75-yard touchdown pass, 34-yard interception return, and a fumble recovery. The Huskies dominated the second half on the way to a 38–20 victory. According to the Seattle Times, it was believed by Husky players that Miami Coach Dennis Erickson had joked that the losers of the game should relinquish their national championship rings from 1991. This gave rise to safety Lawyer Milloy reportedly shouting "Take the rings back," as he walked off the field.

=== 2002 Apple Cup ===
With the game in Pullman, No. 3 Washington State entered the game poised for BCS National Championship game consideration. Unranked Washington was playing to win the so-called Northwest Championship by sweeping their Pacific Northwest rivals, having beat Oregon State and Oregon in their previous two games.

WSU star quarterback Jason Gesser was injured by DT Terry "Tank" Johnson late in the game. The Cougars led 20–10 with less than 4 minutes left in the game, with Matt Kegel having replacing Gesser. UW used a timely interception from freshman cornerback Nate Robinson to force overtime. The teams traded field goals in the first two overtime periods, and John Anderson converted another kick to start the third overtime. During the Cougars' possession, umpire Gordon Riese controversially ruled that Kegel threw a backward pass, which was knocked down and recovered by defensive end Kai Ellis.

The fumble recovery ended the game as a Washington victory. The Martin Stadium crowd erupted angrily in response, and some individuals threw bottles on the field as Washington players and fans celebrated. Then UW athletic director Barbara Hedges said at the time that she "feared for her life."

=== 2009 – "Miracle on Montlake" ===
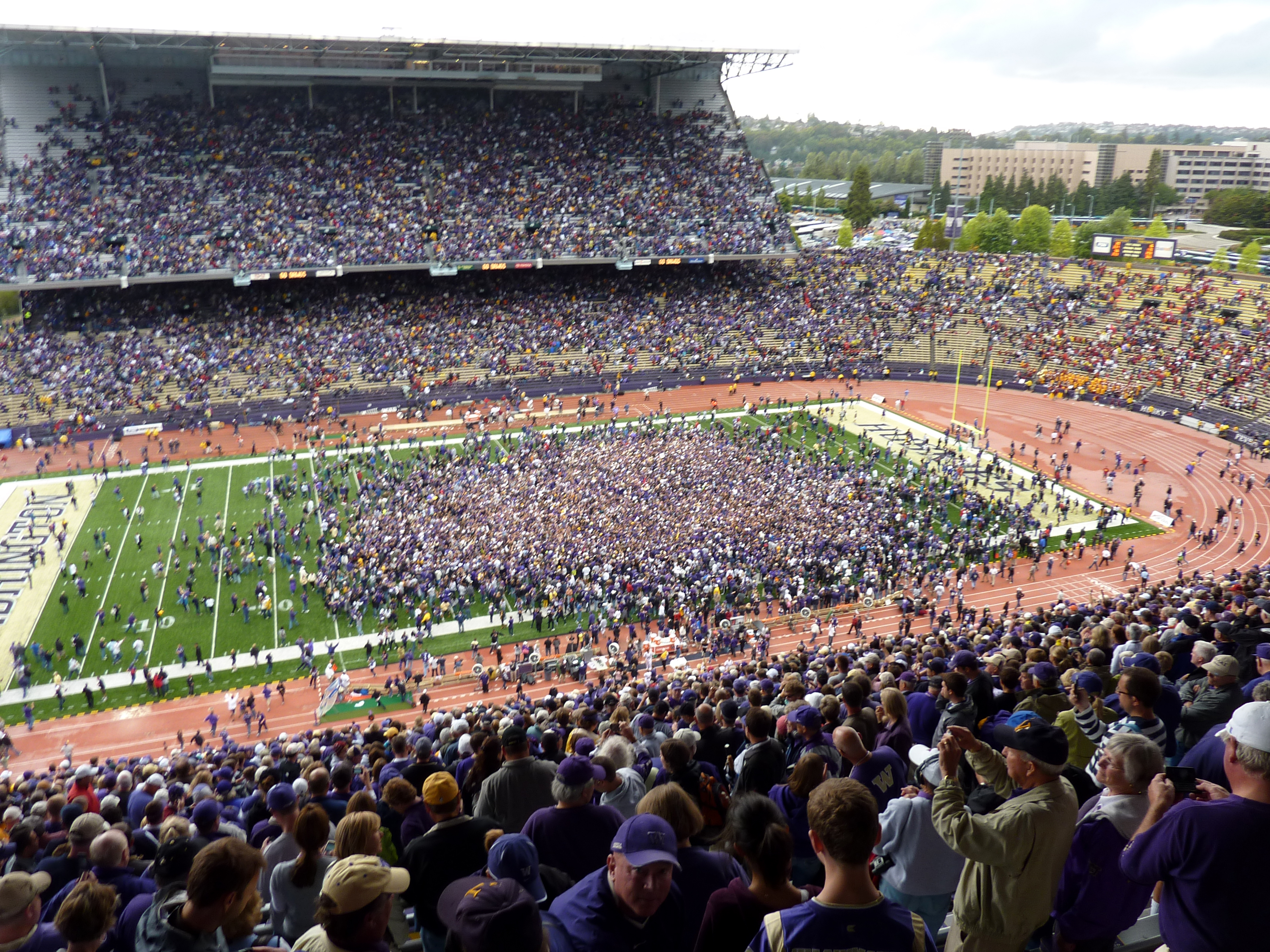
Ecstatic Huskies fans storm the field in celebration after defeating the heavily favored No. 3 USC Trojans in an upset.

Entering the game, the No. 3 Trojans had the national spotlight after their defeat of Ohio State in Columbus the week before. Washington, meanwhile, had just won its first game in 16 contests with a victory over Idaho.

Southern California opened the game with 10 unanswered points, marching down the field with ease. USC was playing without starting quarterback Matt Barkley, who had injured his shoulder the week before at Ohio State, but despite playing with backup QB Aaron Corp, the Trojans were able to lean on an experienced running game and veteran offensive line.

Washington worked its way back into the game with a 4-yard touchdown run by quarterback Jake Locker, trimming the score to 10–7. Late in the second quarter, placekicker Erik Folk kicked a 46-yard field goal to tie the score at 10.

The scored remained tied as the game entered the fourth quarter. After swapping field goals, the Huskies took possession with four minutes left in the game. Locker maneuvered the Huskies down the field, converting on two key third downs, including a 3rd-and-15 from his team's own 28 where Locker threw across the sideline to Jermaine Kearse for 21 yards. The Huskies would eventually drive to the USC 4-yard line before Folk kicked the game-winning field goal for the 16–13 victory, Washington's first conference win since 2007.

=== 2010 – "Deja Vu" ===
On October 2, 2010 the Huskies went on the road to face No. 18 USC at Los Angeles Memorial Coliseum, a place where they had not won since 1996. They hadn't won on the road period since November 3, 2007 against Stanford, a streak of 13 consecutive games. The Huskies led for parts of all four quarters but never put the game away, including a play in which Jake Locker had the ball stripped out of the end-zone on what was a sure touchdown run.

Locker left the game for one play after taking a knee to helmet on a quarterback sneak. Keith Price, a redshirt freshman from Compton, California, came in to make his Washington debut and completed a touchdown pass on his only play of the game, putting the Huskies ahead 29–28. The Trojans made a field goal on the following possession to retake the lead, 31–29. The Huskies' final drive started with two incomplete passes and a near fumble, but on a 4th-and-11 Jake Locker completed a pass to a leaping DeAndre Goodwin. The Huskies continued to push the ball into field goal range in a similar situation to the previous year when playing USC. With 3 seconds left, Erik Folk kicked the game-winning field goal as time expired, giving the Huskies their first road win in three years.

=== 2016 — "70 in Eugene" ===
Prior to this game, Oregon had beaten Washington 12 straight times, ten of which were by a margin of 20 points or more. This was the longest winning streak by either team in the Oregon-Washington football rivalry. The Huskies, ranked No. 5 in the AP Poll after a 44–6 win against No. 7 Stanford at Husky Stadium the previous week, traveled to Autzen Stadium to face a 2–3 Oregon team.

The Oregon winning streak was finally snapped after a 70–21 Washington rout. On the first play from scrimmage, Washington safety Budda Baker, a one-time commit to Oregon, intercepted a pass from Oregon true freshman quarterback Justin Herbert. The Huskies took the lead on a Jake Browning touchdown run with 13:23 left in the first quarter and never relinquished it. The Huskies led 35–7 by halftime, 42–7 after the first possession of the third quarter, and 70–21 with 9:58 left in the fourth quarter.

The Washington offense racked up 682 yards of total offense, averaged 10.1 yards per play, amassed 6 passing touchdowns by quarterback Jake Browning, and scored 70 points, the most scored by either team in the rivalry. This was also the second-most an opponent has ever scored on Oregon in Eugene.

== Future opponents ==
=== Conference opponents ===
Washington is moving to the Big Ten conference for the start of the 2024 season. On October 5, 2023 the Big Ten announced the 5 year conference schedule.

2024	2025	2026	2027	2028
vs Michigan	vs Illinois	vs Indiana	vs Maryland	vs Michigan
vs Northwestern	vs Ohio State	vs Iowa	vs Michigan State	vs Northwestern
vs UCLA	vs Oregon	vs Minnesota	vs Nebraska	vs UCLA
vs USC	vs Purdue	vs Penn State	vs Oregon	vs Wisconsin
at Indiana	vs Rutgers	at Michigan State	vs USC	at Illinois
at Iowa	at Maryland	at Nebraska	at Minnesota	at Indiana
at Oregon	at Michigan	at Oregon	at Northwestern	at Maryland
at Penn State	at UCLA	at Purdue	at Penn State	at Ohio State
at Rutgers	at Wisconsin	at USC	at Rutgers	at Oregon

=== Non-conference opponents ===
Announced schedules as of November 10, 2026.

Year	Date	Opponent	Conference	Site	Notes
2027	Aug 28	Washington State	Pac-12	Martin Stadium • Pullman, WA	Apple Cup
2027	Sep 4	Fresno State	Pac-12	Husky Stadium • Seattle, WA	
2027	Sep 11	Portland State	Big Sky	Husky Stadium • Seattle, WA	
2028	Aug 26	Washington State	Pac-12	Husky Stadium • Seattle, WA	Apple Cup
2028	Sep 2	Eastern Washington	Big Sky	Husky Stadium • Seattle, WA	FCS
2028	Sep 16	UNLV	MW	Husky Stadium • Seattle, WA	
2029	Sep 1	Tennessee	SEC	Neyland Stadium • Knoxville, TN	1st meeting
2029	Sep 8	Boise State	Pac-12	Husky Stadium • Seattle, WA	
2030	Sep 7	Tennessee	SEC	Husky Stadium • Seattle, WA	
2030	Sep 14	Hawaii	MW	Husky Stadium • Seattle, WA	
2031	Sep 27	Notre Dame	Ind	Notre Dame Stadium • Notre Dame, IN	
2033	Sep 17	San Jose State	MW	Husky Stadium • Seattle, WA	
2034	Nov 11	Notre Dame	Ind	Husky Stadium • Seattle, WA	

== See also ==
- List of Washington Huskies in the NFL draft
- College football national championships in NCAA Division I FBS
