= Quarterback U =

Nickname for colleges

Quarterback U is a nickname used by sportswriters to refer to colleges that have trained a series of notable football quarterbacks (QBs). It is a literary device invoked in the individual discretion of sportswriters and does not represent any formal decision-making process or organized sportswriters' poll. Generally speaking, the term implies that many of the school's former quarterbacks later had successful careers in professional football, particularly in the National Football League (NFL).

As of 2023, Alabama and Purdue are tied for first in producing the most number of Super Bowl winning quarterbacks. As of September 2017, the top five universities in terms of the most NFL quarterback passing yards were 219,064 for Purdue, 183,296 for Notre Dame, 157,855 for USC, 152,627 for Stanford and 142,524 for Washington.

On November 18, 2012, The Wall Street Journal reported that, "Purdue may be the ultimate Quarterback U. Since the 1970 merger (between the AFL and NFL), quarterbacks from Purdue have started 724 NFL games, easily the most of any major-conference program." After Purdue QBs' 724 NFL games, the next best schools were the University of Washington (623 starts), Miami (573), University of Southern California (547) and Notre Dame (543).

In August 2018, an Altoona Mirror writer sought to name "Quarterback U" by player achievements, such as NFL starts, Pro Bowl appearances, and Heisman Trophies won. He noted that, in the Super Bowl era, Washington (14), USC (13), Notre Dame (13), Miami (FL) (10), Stanford (10), and UCLA (10) produced at least ten starting NFL quarterbacks, while Purdue recorded the most combined NFL career starts (704). The article concluded that no single program deserved the title significantly more than others. The University of Oregon has produced a notable group of NFL quarterbacks throughout its history. By NFL Draft selections, Oregon has sent 18 quarterbacks to the league, including Dan Fouts, Norm Van Brocklin, Joey Harrington, Akili Smith, Kellen Clemens, Dennis Dixon, Marcus Mariota, Justin Herbert, and Bo Nix. Oregon has also produced multiple first-round selections at quarterback, with Herbert and Mariota both selected in the top six overall. The program’s quarterbacks have accumulated significant NFL starts and awards, highlighted by Fouts’ Hall of Fame career, Mariota’s Heisman Trophy, and Herbert’s Pro Bowl selection.

== Examples ==
=== Brigham Young University ===
Sports writers dubbed the BYU as a Quarterback U from the 1980s through the 1990s under coach LaVell Edwards, akin to USC's reputation as Tailback U. It produced Gifford Nielsen, Marc Wilson, Jim McMahon, Steve Young, Robbie Bosco, Ty Detmer, and Steve Sarkisian. In 2005, the Deseret News wrote that the last great BYU signal caller was 2001 Heisman Trophy runner-up Brandon Doman, who also later served as the Cougars' offensive coordinator. It also asserted that, upon Doman's graduation, head coach Gary Crowton rotated quarterbacks so frequently that it adversely affected their performance.

=== North Carolina State University ===
An October 2019 Sports Illustrated article described NC State as "Quarterback U" after five former quarterbacks (Philip Rivers, Russell Wilson, Mike Glennon, Jacoby Brissett, and Ryan Finley) from the school advanced to play in the NFL between the years of 2003 and 2019. The article noted that four of the five (Rivers, Wilson, Brissett, and Finley) are NFL starting quarterbacks. NC State had been in the conversation as early as 2016 when a CBS Sports article ranked the school at number two behind the University of Southern California on a list that also included Purdue, Boston College, and Michigan. At that point, only Rivers and Wilson held starting positions in the NFL, but the article noted that Glennon had also been a starter for Tampa Bay.

=== Purdue University ===
According to ESPN.com, Purdue QBs have won (and started) more NFL games than any other school; thrown for the most touchdowns and yards in the NFL. Purdue QBs have won more League TD titles (14 through the 2022 NFL season) than any other school. Since the 1960s, Purdue has been known as 'Quarterback U' and 'Cradle of Quarterbacks' by media and rivals such as Ohio State and Notre Dame due to its prominent QBs. Between 1967 and 1974, Purdue QBs Len Dawson and Bob Griese started five Super Bowls, winning three; Cecil Isbell led the Green Bay Packers to an NFL title in 1939, Elmer Oliphant led the Buffalo All-Americans to a disputed NFL title in 1921. The tradition has continued through to this day with Drew Brees winning the Super Bowl XLIV, in which he was also named MVP. Purdue is tied for first with Alabama in producing Super Bowl winning quarterbacks. Sixteen (16) Purdue QBs reached the NFL; including starting QBs in Bob DeMoss, Dale Samuels, Mike Phipps, Gary Danielson, Jim Everett, Mark Herrmann, Aidan O'Connell and Kyle Orton; Scott Campbell and Curtis Painter were well-known backup quarterbacks. David Blough finished his playing career on the practice squad of the Detroit Lions in 2023. As of February 2024 he’s been an assistant QBs coach for the Washington Commanders. Danny Etling is on the roster of the Green Bay Packers. Other Purdue quarterbacks who reached the NFL are Ron Meyer, former head coach of the Indianapolis Colts and New England Patriots; Ross Fichtner, who won an NFL title at cornerback with the Cleveland Browns, even serving as the emergency backup quarterback for the Browns in their 1964 NFL Championship Game appearance; John Reeves spent time in the NFL as a linebacker. Joey Elliott and Robert Marve were starting QBs in the Canadian Football League.

Additionally, Bernie Allen, long-time 2B for the Minnesota Twins and the Washington Senators preceded Meyer under center for the Boilermakers.

=== Stanford University ===
As early as 1975, the term Quarterback U had been applied to Stanford University, which had produced such players as Frankie Albert, John Brodie, Jim Plunkett, Don Bunce, and Mike Boryla. This reputation was enhanced when Bill Walsh joined the Cardinal as head coach, and quarterbacks Guy Benjamin, Steve Dils, and Turk Schonert promptly led the NCAA in passing in 1977, 1978, and 1979. They were followed by perhaps Stanford's best-known quarterback, John Elway, who played at the university from 1979 to 1982, finishing second in the Heisman voting his senior season. Elway would go on to have a Hall of Fame career with the Broncos and win the Super Bowl in 1997 and 1998. By 1989, the San Jose Mercury News surmised that Stanford's "once bright legacy" as Quarterback U appeared "to be flickering out". However, recently Stanford's quarterback tradition has experienced something of a revival under Andrew Luck. Luck finished second in the voting for the Heisman trophy, the award given to college football's most outstanding player, in both 2010 and 2011. When drafted by the Indianapolis Colts in the 2012 NFL draft, he became the fourth Stanford quarterback taken with the first overall pick, following Elway, Plunkett and Bobby Garrett, but the first since Elway was taken by the Colts in 1983. Stanford quarterbacks have started 7 Super Bowls, winning 4, and garnering two Super Bowl Most Valuable Player Awards.

=== Texas Tech University ===
In 2005, a Sporting News writer described Texas Tech as Quarterback U in an article that bestowed several positional "U" monikers with the criteria being college performance since 2000. Its author cited head coach Mike Leach's numerous 4,000-yard-plus passers. More recently, Texas Tech can claim Kansas City Chiefs quarterback Patrick Mahomes among its ranks.

=== University of Maryland ===
During the 1980s, the term was also applied to Maryland, which produced several NFL-caliber quarterbacks during the tenures of head coach Bobby Ross and offensive coordinator and quarterbacks/receivers coach Joe Krivak. These Maryland quarterbacks included Boomer Esiason, Frank Reich, Neil O'Donnell, Scott Zolak, and Stan Gelbaugh. In 2005, The Washington Post reapplied the label to the Terrapins under head coach Ralph Friedgen and offensive coordinator Charlie Taaffe, after Sam Hollenbach became the Atlantic Coast Conference's leading passer. That coaching staff also groomed Shaun Hill and Scott McBrien.

=== University of Miami ===
In the 1980s, the term was often applied to the University of Miami. In 2003, Tracy Gale, a sport publicist working for the University of Miami, named Fran Curci, who was Miami's quarterback in 1959, as the start of what he called "Miami's Quarterback U tradition." George Mira, Jim Kelly, Bernie Kosar, Vinny Testaverde, Steve Walsh, Ken Dorsey, Craig Erickson, Gino Torretta, and Cam Ward are some Hurricanes quarterbacks that influenced his use of the term. The term is still often applied, although Miami currently has fewer quarterbacks starting in the NFL than it has in the past. In 2008, all three Miami quarterbacks entered the season with no game experience, and pundits charged head coach Randy Shannon with rebuilding the program's reputation of producing high-quality signalcallers.

=== University of Michigan ===
In recent years, sportswriters have mentioned several schools as being appropriate for the designation. A 2005 ESPN article cited that, since 1988, Michigan sent as many starting quarterbacks to the NFL as the University of Miami. It argued that "three yards and a cloud of dust" is no longer the offensive philosophy at Michigan. A year later, Rivals.com proclaimed that Michigan was "the new Quarterback U." Elvis Grbac, Todd Collins, Tom Brady, Jim Harbaugh, Brian Griese and Chad Henne are some of the Wolverine quarterbacks who have gone on to start in the NFL.

=== University of Southern California ===
USC is traditionally known as Tailback U, but after the 2008 season The Los Angeles Times claimed that it was the school most deserving of the designation Quarterback U. Since 2009, eight former USC quarterbacks started in an NFL game: Matt Leinart, Matt Cassel, Carson Palmer, Mark Sanchez, Matt Barkley, Cody Kessler, Sam Darnold and Caleb Williams.

=== University of Washington ===
Washington quarterbacks have consistently advanced to the NFL, with 16 of the previous 18 starting quarterbacks as of 2012 having started in the NFL. Washington's Pro Football Hall of Fame member Warren Moon is fourth in all-time passing yardage, reflecting his CFL and NFL careers. Other notable alumni include Chris Chandler, Mark Brunell, Billy Joe Hobert Damon Huard, Brock Huard, Marques Tuiasosopo, Jake Locker, Jake Browning, and Jacob Eason. ESPN points to the program's history by the early 1980s.

== See also ==
- Linebacker U, a nickname for the Penn State football program
