= Husky Marching Band =

Marching band of the University of Washington

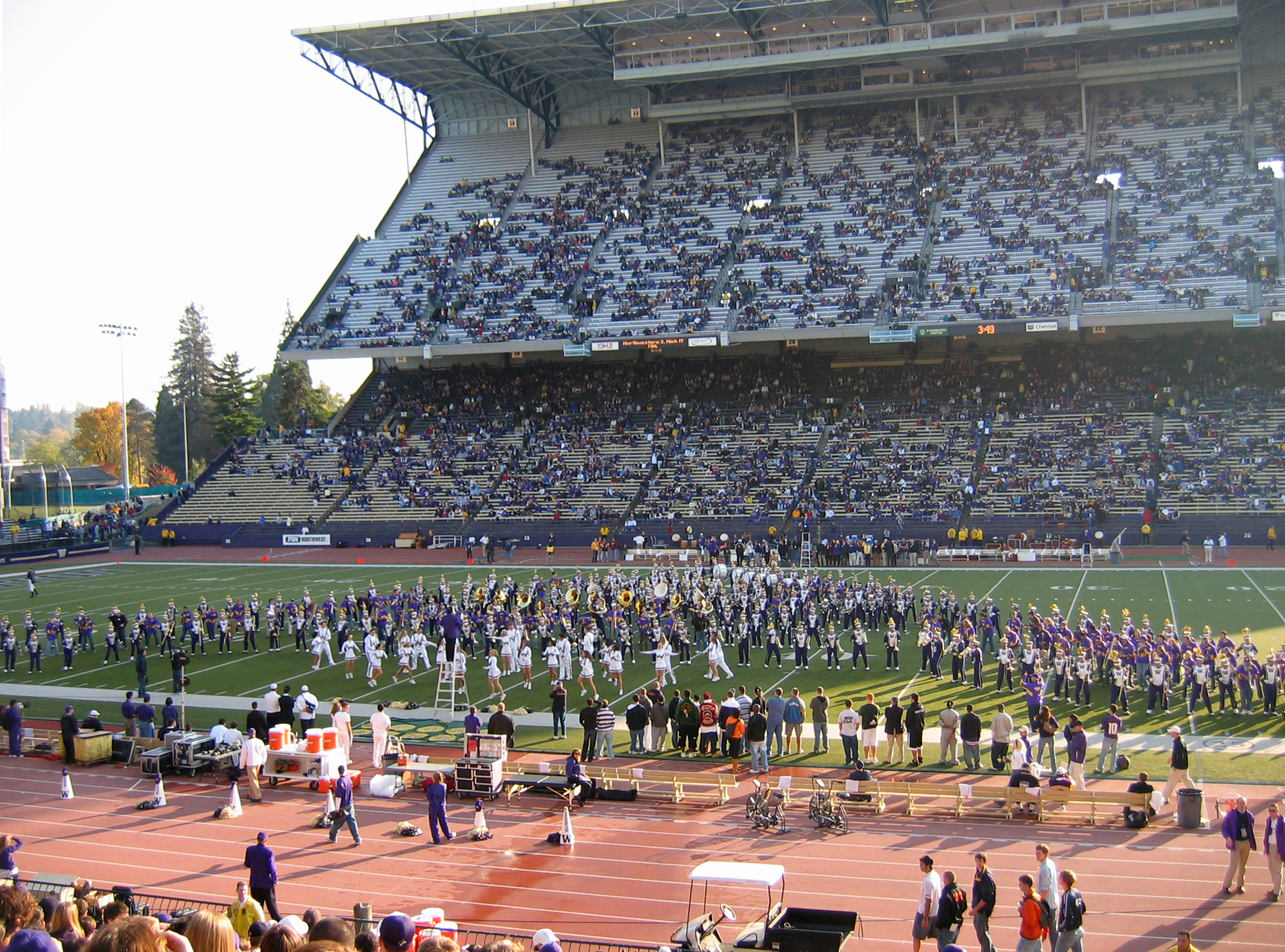
- Husky Band performs during pre-game activities at Husky Stadium
- School: University of Washington
- Location: Seattle, WA
- Conference: Big Ten Conference
- Founded: 1929
- Director: Dr. Corey Jahlas
- Assistant Directors: Edd George, Marcus Pimpleton, Yuman Wu, Chris Seay
- Members: 280
- Fight song: "Bow Down to Washington" and "Vict'ry for Washington"
- Motto: "Touch of Class"
- Website: www.huskymarchingband.org

The University of Washington Husky Marching Band (Husky Band, or HMB) is the marching band of the University of Washington. HMB uses the traditional Big Ten-style chair step style of marching. The HMB is a year-round ensemble that actively participates in supporting all Husky sports. Members participate during the fall to help support Husky Football at all home football games and selected away games. The 2026 season is the 97th for the HMB.

The Husky Band, under the direction of Bill Bissell, is credited with the invention of the Wave in 1981.

An event for local high school bands, Band Day at Husky football games began in 1950 under former director Walter C. Welke.

The HMB is a traveling group, sending many pep bands to away games. The full band has performed at the College Football Hall of Fame in Atlanta, Georgia. and traveled and performed in Japan, China, and Europe. In addition, the HMB plays at various community events around Seattle and does a full show at one local high school once a year. The 2015–2016 season included a trip to Vancouver, B.C. to perform at a B.C. Lions football game as well as a trip to the 2016 Women's Final Four in Indianapolis. The 2023-2024 season also included a trip to Vancouver, B.C, as well as traveling to Las Vegas, NV for the Pac-12 Football Championship Game, New Orleans, LA for the Sugar Bowl, and Houston, TX for the College Football Playoff National Championship in support of Husky Football.

== Directors ==
- Walter C. Welke (1929–1956)
- Bill Cole (1957–1970)
- Bill Bissell (1970–1993)
- Dr. Brad McDavid (1994–2024)
- Dr. Corey Jahlas (2024-)

== Instrumentation ==
- Drum Majors
- Feature Twirler
- Piccolos
- Clarinets
- Alto Saxophones
- Tenor Saxophones
- Mellophones
- Trumpets
- Trombones
- Baritones
- Sousaphones
- Snares
- Basses
- Tenors
- Cymbals
