= Bow Down to Washington =

Fight song for University of Washington

- Year: 1915
- Genre: Fight song
- Written: Lester J. Wilson
- Commissioned by: The Daily
- Performed: November 6, 1915
- Published: November 13, 1915

Recordings
- Vic Meyers and His Hotel Butler Orchestra (1928): file; help

Bow Down to Washington is the official fight song of the University of Washington. It was written by Lester J. Wilson in 1915 while partaking in a competition requesting a new song for the university. The competition was sponsored by the campus newspaper, The Daily, and had a grand prize of US$25 (the equivalent of $655 in 2021).

"Bow Down to Washington" was first used as a fight song at the Washington-California football game on November 6, 1915, in a 72–0 away victory. The lyrics were first published one week later in the home program for the November 13, 1915 contest at Denny Field, again versus California. The original lyrics refer frequently to California and snaring the Golden Bear, but later versions of the song dropped these lines.

The song is typically played and sung at all University of Washington sporting events at which the University of Washington Husky Marching Band is present, including all football, basketball, and volleyball games.

== Lyrics ==
Bow Down to Washington, Bow Down to Washington.
Mighty are the men who wear the Purple and the Gold,
Joyfully we welcome them within the Victor's fold.
We will carve our name in the Hall of Fame,
To preserve the memory of our Devotion.

So, heaven help the foes of Washington,
They're trembling at the feet of mighty Washington.
Our boys are there with bells, their fighting blood excels,
It's harder to push them over the lines than pass the Dardanelles.
So Victory's the cry of Washington
Our leather lungs together with a Rah! Rah! Rah!
And o'er the land, the loyal band
Will sing the glory of Washington forever!
