= List of Washington Huskies starting quarterbacks =

These quarterbacks have started for the Washington Huskies. They are listed in order of the date of each man's first start at quarterback.

== Main starting quarterbacks ==
These are the quarterbacks who were the passing leaders for that season.

Year	Name	GP	GS	Att	Comp	Yard	TD	Int	Pct	Rating	Next career
2025	Demond Williams Jr.	13	13	354	246	3,065	25	8	69.5%	161.0	
2024	Will Rogers	11	11	311	220	2,458	14	7	70.7%	147.5	NFL
2023	Michael Penix Jr.	15	15	555	363	4,903	36	11	65.4%	157.1	NFL
2022	Michael Penix Jr.	13	13	554	362	4,641	31	8	65.3%	151.3	NFL
2021	Dylan Morris	11	11	363	220	2,458	14	12	60.6%	123.6	Transfer
2020	Dylan Morris	4	4	405	110	897	4	3	60.9%	136.0	Transfer
2019	Jacob Eason	13	13	405	260	3,132	23	8	64.2%	143.9	NFL
2018	Jake Browning	14	14	388	252	3,192	16	10	64.9%	142.5	NFL
2017	Jake Browning	13	13	336	230	2,719	19	5	68.5%	152.1	NFL
2016	Jake Browning	12	12	391	243	3,430	43	9	62.1%	167.5	NFL
2015	Jake Browning	12	12	368	233	2,955	16	10	63.3%	139.7	NFL
2014	Cyler Miles	12	12	329	219	2,397	17	4	66.6%	142.4	Out of FB
2013	Keith Price	12	12	352	233	2,966	21	6	66.2%	153.2	CFL
2012	Keith Price	13	13	432	263	2,728	19	13	60.9%	122.4	CFL
2011	Keith Price	13	12	362	242	3,063	33	11	66.9%	161.93	CFL
2010	Jake Locker	12	12	332	184	2,265	17	9	55.4%	124.20	NFL
2009	Jake Locker	12	12	395	230	2,800	21	11	58.2%	129.75	NFL
2008	Ronnie Fouch	11	8	250	113	1,339	4	13	58.2%	85.1	Transfer
2007	Jake Locker	12	12	328	155	2,062	14	15	47.3%	105.0	NFL
2006	Isaiah Stanback	7	7	189	101	1,325	10	3	53.4%	126.6	NFL
2005	Isaiah Stanback	11	11	264	143	2,136	9	6	54.2%	128.8	NFL
2004	Casey Paus	11	8	274	116	1,476	5	17	42.3%	81.2	Out of FB
2003	Cody Pickett	12	12	454	257	3,043	15	13	56.6%	118.1	NFL
2002	Cody Pickett	13	13	612	365	4,458	28	14	59.6%	131.3	NFL
2001	Cody Pickett	11	11	355	196	2,696	12	16	55.2%	121.1	NFL
2000	Marques Tuiasosopo	12	12	345	186	2,284	15	11	53.9%	117.5	NFL
1999	Marques Tuiasosopo	12	12	322	189	2,418	12	12	58.7%	126.6	NFL
1998	Brock Huard	10	10	347	191	2,191	15	15	55%	113.7	NFL
1997	Brock Huard	11	11	274	164	2,319	25	10	59.9%	153.8	NFL
1996	Brock Huard	12	9	254	129	1,881	13	6	50.8%	125.2	NFL
1995	Damon Huard	12	12	313	198	2,609	13	6	63.3%	143.2	NFL
1994	Damon Huard	11	11	275	153	1,887	13	12	55.6%	120.1	NFL
1993	Damon Huard	10	8	197	116	1,282	9	10	58.9%	118.5	NFL
1992	Mark Brunell	12	7	219	127	1,609	7	4	58%	126.6	NFL
1991	Billy Joe Hobert	12	12	319	191	2,463	24	12	59.9%	142.1	NFL
1990	Mark Brunell	12	12	275	132	1,895	16	9	48%	118.5	NFL
1989	Cary Conklin	12	12	404	229	2,786	18	17	56.7%	120.9	NFL
1988	Cary Conklin	11	11	302	153	1,833	11	12	50.7%	105.8	NFL
1987	Chris Chandler	12	12	279	143	1,973	11	14	51.3%	113.7	NFL
1986	Chris Chandler	12	12	318	180	2,193	20	15	56.6%	125.8	NFL
1985	Hugh Millen	9	9	264	158	1,565	6	14	59.8%	106.5	NFL
1984	Hugh Millen	11	8	175	91	1,092	6	9	52%	105.4	NFL
1983	Steve Pelluer	12	12	357	232	2,365	11	8	65%	126.3	NFL
1982	Steve Pelluer	10	8	200	113	1,248	10	10	56.5%	115.4	NFL
1981	Steve Pelluer	12	10	263	125	1,280	9	9	47.5%	92.8	NFL
1980	Tom Flick	12	12	319	191	2,460	15	13	59.9%	132.0	NFL
1979	Tom Flick	10	6	122	71	852	6	6	58.2%	123.3	NFL
1978	Tom Porras			176	84	1,151	6	8	47.7%		CFL, USFL
1977	Warren Moon	12	12	222	125	1,772	12	9	56.3%	133.1	CFL, NFL
1976	Warren Moon	11	11	175	81	1,106	6	8	46.3%	101.6	CFL, NFL
1975	Chris Rowland			117	45	597	4	6	38.5%		Out of FB
1974	Chris Rowland			124	59	848	5	10	47.6%		Out of FB
1973	Chris Rowland			234	97	1,521	15	24	41.5%		Out of FB
1972	Sonny Sixkiller	7	7	152	73	1,125	7	11	48%	110.9	WFL
1971	Sonny Sixkiller	11	11	297	126	2,068	13	18	42.4%	103.2	WFL
1970	Sonny Sixkiller	10	9	362	186	2,303	15	22	51.4%	106.4	WFL
1969	Gene Willis			99	33	568	5	13	33.3%		
1968	Jerry Kaloper			115	43	595	0	9	37.4%		
1967	Tom Manke			81	32	613	5	8	39.5%	103.7	Transfer
1966	Tom Sparlin			165	68	954	4	19	41.2%		
1965	Todd Hullin			168	90	1,318	13	9	53.6%		
1964	Bill Douglas			64	33	360	0	5	51.6%		
1963	Bill Douglas			113	64	952	6	3	56.6%		
1962	Bill Siler			27	15	294	3	2	55.6%		
1961	Pete Ohler			59	17	394	3	8	28.8%		CFL
1960	Bob Hivner			58	31	580	6	4	53.4%		
1959	Bob Schloredt			82	44	835	6	2	53.7%	157.2	CFL
1958	Bob Hivner			115	48	587	3	13	41.7%		
1957	Bob Dunn			55	16	227	2	3	29.1%		
1956	Al Ferguson			41	20	418	3	2	48.8%		
1955	Steve Roake			61	27	410	3	2	44.3%		
1954	Bob Cox			146	66	809	4	12	45.2%		
1953	Sandy Lederman			189	92	1,157	8	14	48.7%		
1952	Don Heinrich	10	10	270	137	1,647	13	17	50.7%	105.2	NFL
1951	Sam Mitchell			167	79	1,102	8	9	47.3%		
1950	Don Heinrich	10	10	221	134	1,846	14	9	60.6%	143.3	NFL
1949	Don Heinrich	10	7	119	64	899	6	7	53.8%	122.1	NFL
1948	Ansel McCullough			105	53	618	4	7	50.5%		
1947	Dick Ottele			30	10	147	—	4	33.3%		NFL
1946	Fred Provo			46	27	435	—	5	58.7%		NFL
1945											
1944											
1943											
1942											
1941	Bob Erickson			58	20	204	—	7	34.5%		
1940	Dean McAdams			83	29	475	—	10	34.9%		NFL
1939	Dean McAdams			76	35	477	—	5	46.1%		NFL
1938	Bill Gleason			38	13	209	—	8	34.2%		
1937	Frank Waskowitz			67	19	407	—	6	28.4%		
1936	Elmer Logg										
1935	Elmer Logg										
1934	Elmer Logg										
1933											
1932											
1931											
1930											
1929											
1928											
1927											
1926	George Guttormsen										
1925	George Guttormsen										
1924											
1923											

== See also ==
- Pro-Football-Reference.com Washington Huskies
