= Jaime Fields =

American football player (1970–1999)

No. 59, 55
- Position: Linebacker

Personal information
- Born: August 28, 1970; Compton, California, U.S.
- Died: August 29, 1999 (aged 29); Downey, California, U.S.
- Listed height: 5 ft 11 in (1.80 m)
- Listed weight: 246 lb (112 kg)

Career information
- High school: Lynwood (CA)
- College: Washington
- NFL draft: 1993: 4th round, 103rd overall pick

Career history
- Kansas City Chiefs (1993–1995); Scottish Claymores (1997)

Awards and highlights
- National champion (1991); Second-team All-Pac-10 (1992)

Career NFL statistics
- Tackles: 25
- Forced fumbles: 1
- Fumble recoveries: 1
- Stats at Pro Football Reference

Jaime Fields (August 28, 1970 – August 29, 1999) was an American professional football player, a linebacker with the Kansas City Chiefs of the National Football League (NFL) for three seasons. He played college football at the University of Washington in Seattle and was selected in the fourth round of the 1993 NFL draft.

After his playing career, Fields was killed at age 29 in a hit-and-run automobile crash in southern California.

== Early life ==
Born and raised in southern California, Fields attended Lynwood High School in Lynwood.

== College career ==
Fields played for the Washington Huskies from 1988 to 1992 for head coach Don James. He was known on the field for his speed and hitting ferocity. With Fields at linebacker, the Huskies went to three consecutive Rose Bowls as Pacific-10 Conference champions and shared a national championship (1991) after the second.
