= 1991 Michigan Wolverines football team =

American college football season

1991 Michigan Wolverines football

Big Ten champion

Rose Bowl, L 14–34 vs. Washington
- Conference: Big Ten Conference

Ranking
- Coaches: No. 6
- AP: No. 6
- Record: 10–2 (8–0 Big Ten)
- Head coach: Gary Moeller (2nd season)
- Defensive coordinator: Lloyd Carr (5th season)
- MVP: Desmond Howard
- Captains: Erick Anderson; Greg Skrepenak
- Home stadium: Michigan Stadium

1991 Big Ten Conference football standings
	Conf.					Overall
Team	W		L		T	W		L		T
No. 6 Michigan $	8	–	0	–	0	10	–	2	–	0
No. 10 Iowa	7	–	1	–	0	10	–	1	–	1
Ohio State	5	–	3	–	0	8	–	4	–	0
Indiana	5	–	3	–	0	7	–	4	–	1
Illinois	4	–	4	–	0	6	–	6	–	0
Purdue	3	–	5	–	0	4	–	7	–	0
Michigan State	3	–	5	–	0	3	–	8	–	0
Wisconsin	2	–	6	–	0	5	–	6	–	0
Northwestern	2	–	6	–	0	3	–	8	–	0
Minnesota	1	–	7	–	0	2	–	9	–	0
$ – Conference champion; Rankings from AP Poll

The 1991 Michigan Wolverines football team was an American football team that represented the University of Michigan as a member of the Big Ten Conference during the 1991 NCAA Division I-A football season. In their second year under head coach Gary Moeller, the Wolverines compiled a 10–2 record (8–0 in conference games), outscored opponents by a total of 406 to 169, and won their fourth of five consecutive Big Ten championships. They lost to national champion Washington in the 1992 Rose Bowl and were ranked No. 6 in the final AP and Coaches Polls.

unamiousWide receiver Desmond Howard won the Heisman Trophy and the Maxwell Award and was selected as a unanimous first-team All-American after tallying 950 receiving yards, 634 return yards, and 165 rushing yards and scoring 138 points on 23 touchdowns. Other notable individual accomplishments included:

- Quarterback Elvis Grbac completed 66.7% of his passes, threw 24 touchdown passes, and led the nation in passing efficiency.
- Offensive tackle Greg Skrepenak was a unanimous first-team All-American.
- Linebacker Erick Anderson won the Butkus Award as the top linebacker in college football.

The team played its home games at Michigan Stadium in Ann Arbor, Michigan.

== Schedule ==
Date	Time	Opponent	Rank	Site	TV	Result	Attendance	Source
September 7	3:30 p.m.	at Boston College*	No. 2	Alumni Stadium; Chestnut Hill, MA	ABC	W 35–13	32,071	
September 14	3:30 p.m.	No. 7 Notre Dame*	No. 3	Michigan Stadium; Ann Arbor, MI (rivalry)	ABC	W 24–14	106,138	
September 28	12:00 p.m.	No. 1 Florida State*	No. 3	Michigan Stadium; Ann Arbor, MI	ABC	L 31–51	106,145	
October 5	3:30 p.m.	at No. 9 Iowa	No. 7	Kinnick Stadium; Iowa City, IA	ABC	W 43–24	70,220	
October 12	3:30 p.m.	at Michigan State	No. 5	Spartan Stadium; East Lansing, MI (rivalry)	ABC	W 45–28	80,157	
October 19	12:30 p.m.	Indiana^{†}	No. 4	Michigan Stadium; Ann Arbor, MI	ESPN	W 24–16	106,097	
October 25	8:00 p.m.	at Minnesota	No. 4	Hubert H. Humphrey Metrodome; Minneapolis, MN (Little Brown Jug)		W 52–6	32,577	
November 2	12:30 p.m.	Purdue	No. 4	Michigan Stadium; Ann Arbor, MI	ESPN	W 42–0	105,401	
November 9	1:00 p.m.	Northwestern	No. 4	Michigan Stadium; Ann Arbor, MI (rivalry)		W 59–14	102,087	
November 16	3:30 p.m.	at No. 25 Illinois	No. 4	Memorial Stadium; Champaign, IL (rivalry)	ABC	W 20–0	66,757	
November 23	12:00 p.m.	No. 18 Ohio State	No. 4	Michigan Stadium; Ann Arbor, MI (The Game)	ABC	W 31–3	106,156	
January 1, 1992	4:30 p.m.	vs. No. 2 Washington*	No. 4	Rose Bowl; Pasadena, CA (Rose Bowl)	ABC	L 14–34	103,566	
*Non-conference game; ^{†}Homecoming; Rankings from AP Poll released prior to the game; All times are in Eastern time; Source:

== Rankings ==
Ranking movements Legend: ██ Increase in ranking ██ Decrease in ranking ( ) = First-place votes
	Week															
Poll	Pre	1	2	3	4	5	6	7	8	9	10	11	12	13	14	Final
AP	2 (5)	2 (1)	3 (1)	3 (1)	3 (1)	7	5	4	4	4	4	4	4	4	4	6
Coaches	3 (6)	3 (6)	4 (3)	3 (4)	3 (4)	9	6	4	4	4	4	4	3	3	3	6

== Game summaries ==
=== Boston College ===
Desmond Howard's 93 yard kickoff return for a touchdown to start the 2nd half sparked the Wolverines to a 35–13 victory over Boston College. The Eagles had closed to 14-13 early in the 4th quarter. BC had jumped to 10–0 lead after the 1st quarter, but the Wolverines rallied behind Howard's four touchdowns. Howard caught three touchdown passes from Elvis Grbac. Lance Dottin returned an interception 50 yards for a touchdown to close out the scoring for Michigan. Ricky Powers led the ground attack with 176 yards rushing.

=== Notre Dame ===
Team	1	2	3	4	Total
No. 7 Fighting Irish	0	7	7	0	14
• No. 3 Wolverines	3	14	0	7	24

- Date: September 14
- Location: Michigan Stadium, Ann Arbor, MI

Scoring summary
1	MICH	Carlson 23 yard field goal	MICH 3–0
2	MICH	Howard 29 yard run (Carlson kick)	MICH 10–0
2	MICH	Powers 16 yard run (Carlson kick)	MICH 17–0
2	ND	Bettis 3 yard pass from Mirer (Hentrich kick)	MICH 17–7
3	ND	T. Smith 35 yard pass from Mirer (Hentrich kick)	MICH 17–14
4	MICH	Howard 25 yard pass from Grbac (Carlson kick)	MICH 24–14

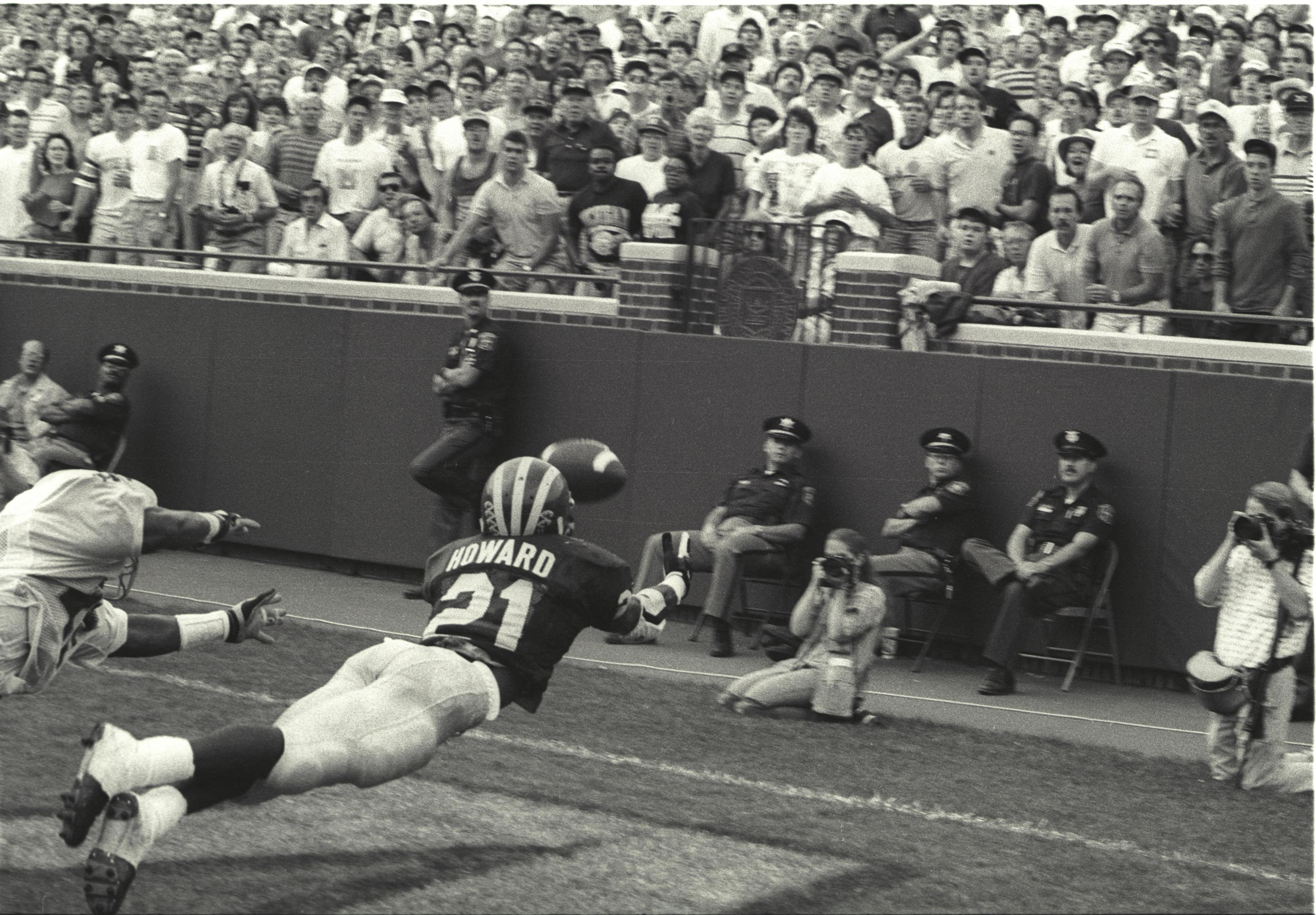
Desmond Howard leaping for “the Catch”.

Michigan, ranked #3, jumped to a 17–0 lead late in the 2nd quarter and held on for a 24–14 win over #7 Notre Dame. Desmond Howard scored twice, on a 29-yard run and a 25-yard reception from Elvis Grbac on 4th and inches, which effectively clinched the game. The latter would become known as "The Catch" and helped propel Howard to the Heisman Trophy. Ricky Powers ran for 164 yards and a touchdown while Grbac completed 20 of 22 passes for 195 yards. Lance Dottin had an interception and John Carlson kicked a 22-yard field goal. With the win, the Wolverines ended a four-game losing streak against the Irish.

=== Florida State ===
Florida State at Michigan

Team	1	2	3	4	Total
• No. 1 Seminoles	19	12	6	14	51
No. 3 Wolverines	10	13	0	8	31

- Date: September 28
- Location: Michigan Stadium, Ann Arbor, MI
- Game attendance: 106,145
- Television network: ABC

A matchup of two teams ranked in the top 3 ended in a blowout, 51–31, in favor of Florida State. It would be FSU's 10th consecutive victory, while marking the sixth time Michigan had lost to a No. 1 team in an eight-year stretch. The 51 points was the third-highest total by an opponent in Michigan history, the most ever by a visitor at Michigan Stadium and the most in any game against the Wolverines since Northwestern scored 55 in 1958. Eight Florida State touchdowns—scored by seven players—tied for the most a Michigan team has allowed. The #1 ranked Seminoles confused and pressured #3 ranked Michigan into four interceptions, three thrown by quarterback Elvis Grbac. Two were returned for touchdowns. Terrell Buckley's stunning 40-yard return on Michigan's second offensive play was the first of his two interceptions. Michigan was held to a total of 120 rushing yards.

=== Iowa ===
Michigan at Iowa

Team	1	2	3	4	Total
• No. 7 Wolverines	7	12	7	17	43
No. 9 Hawkeyes	0	18	0	6	24

- Date: October 5
- Location: Kinnick Stadium, Iowa City, IA
- Game start: 2:30PM CDT
- Game attendance: 70,220

Scoring summary
1	8:26	Mich	21-yard blocked punt return (Carlson kick)	Michigan 7–0
2	14:31	Iowa	Montgomery 1-yard run (Skillett kick failed)	Michigan 7–6
2	12:35	Iowa	Matt Rodgers 8-yard run (Pass failed)	Iowa 12–7
2	6:16	Iowa	Danan Hughes 17-yard pass from Matt Rodgers (Run failed)	Iowa 18–7
2	3:21	Mich	Powers 2-yard run (Pass failed)	Iowa 18–13
2	0:31	Mich	J. Johnson 28-yard pass from E. Grbac (Pass failed)	Michigan 19–18
3	8:25	Mich	D. Howard 20-yard pass from E. Grbac (Carlson kick)	Michigan 26–18
4	13:47	Mich	D. Howard 2-yard pass from E. Grbac (Carlson kick)	Michigan 33–18
4	9:39	Mich	Carlson 25-yard field goal	Michigan 36–18
4	6:52	Iowa	Matt Rodgers 8-yard run (Pass failed)	Michigan 36–24
4	0:34	Mich	J. Johnson 17-yard run (Carlson kick)	Michigan 43–24

The Hawkeyes led 18–7 midway through the second quarter, but could not stop the Michigan ground game as the Wolverines rolled up 371 yards rushing on 50 attempts. Jesse Johnson led the way with 168 yards and a touchdown while Elvis Grbac completed 14 of 22 passes for 196 yards and three touchdown passes. Desmond Howard caught a 20-yard and a 2-yard TD reception. Johnson caught a 28-yard TD pass from Grbac as well. The Wolverines rolled up 567 yards of total offense on their way to a 43–24 victory.

=== Michigan State ===
Elvis Grbac threw three 1st half touchdowns, including two of them to Desmond Howard as they jumped to a 21–0 lead on the way to a 45-28 pasting of the Spartans. Ricky Powers rushed for 148 yards and Jesse Johnson ran for two touchdowns as the Wolverines rang up 326 yards on the ground. The Michigan defense held Michigan State to 84 yards rushing, while Dave Ritter and Cole Wallace each had interceptions. Howard had 8 catches for 101 yards.

=== Indiana ===
The #4 ranked Wolverines were pushed to the limit by the Hoosiers, but held on and prevailed 24–16 in a tightly contested game. The Hoosier defense held the Wolverines to 261 yards of total offense. Thanks to Desmond Howard and Elvis Grbac, the Wolverines pulled out the win on three Grbac TD passes to Howard. John Carlson added a 36-yard field goal.

External videos
- 1991 Indiana at Michigan – Game highlights

=== Minnesota ===
Once again it was the Grbac and Howard show as the #4 ranked Wolverines stormed out to a 28–0 lead on the way to a 52–6 victory over the Golden Gophers and retained the Little Brown Jug for another year. Ricky Powers, Desmond Howard and Tyrone Wheatley each scored two touchdowns. Howard caught 6 passes for 155 yards and Elvis Grbac passed for 242 yards and three TD passes. Pat Maloney and Shonte Peoples had interceptions and the defense held Minnesota to 250 yards of total offense.

=== Purdue ===
The Wolverine defense was ferocious and held the Boilermakers to 188 yards of total offense while the offense scored at will as Michigan shutout Purdue, 42–0. Ricky Powers, Tyrone Wheatley and Desmond Howard each scored two touchdowns to lead the Wolverines. Powers and Wheatley on the ground and Howard on passes from Elvis Grbac. Powers finished with 118 yards rushing while Howard had 7 catches for 108 yards. Grbac finished with 175 yards on 11 of 16 completions.

=== Northwestern ===
The #4 ranked Wolverines raced to a 45–7 halftime lead on the way to a 59–14 victory over Northwestern. Michigan ran for 368 yards and three Wolverine quarterbacks passed for 259 yards, led by Elvis Grbac who completed 9 of 16 passes for 229 yards and a TD pass. Tyrone Wheatley ran for 141 yards and two touchdowns while Ricky Powers ran for three touchdowns and Jesse Johnson ran for two touchdowns.

=== Illinois ===
Desmond Howard and John Carlson provided all the Michigan points as they shutout the Fighting Illini in Champaign, 20–0. Howard caught a 1-yard TD reception and ran 15 yards for his touchdowns while Carlson kicked field goals from 36 and 43 yards. Ricky Powers ran for 151 yards and Jesse Johnson ran for 104 yards. Howard caught 7 passes for 80 yards. The Wolverine defense held the Illini to 49 yards rushing while the offense controlled the ball for over 38 minutes.

=== Ohio State ===
Desmond Howard put an exclamation point on his Heisman Trophy winning season with a 93-yard punt return for a touchdown as the Wolverines routed their hated rival Ohio State, 31–3. Howard also caught 3 passes for 96 yards. Tyrone Wheatley, Jesse Johnson and Burnie Legette each had touchdown runs for the Wolverines. The Michigan defense held the Buckeyes to 233 yards of total offense while Kirk Herbstreit was held to completing 8 of 11 passes for 82 yards. Lance Dottin intercepted a pass for the Wolverine defense. John Carlson added a field goal to give Michigan a 17–3 lead in the 2nd quarter. Michigan controlled the ball for nearly 34 minutes in the game.

=== Vs. Washington (Rose Bowl) ===
Washington vs. Michigan

Team	1	2	3	4	Total
• No. 2 Huskies	0	13	8	13	34
No. 4 Wolverines	0	7	0	7	14

- Date: January 1
- Location: Rose Bowl, Pasadena, California
- Game start: 1:45 pm PDT
- Game attendance: 103,566
- Referee: Jimmy Harper (SEC)
- TV announcers (ABC): Keith Jackson and Bob Griese

Scoring summary
Q2	14:57	UW	Billy Joe Hobert 2 yard run (Travis Hanson kick)	UW 7–0
Q2	13:09	UM	Walter Smith 9 yard pass from Elvis Grbac (J.D. Carlson kick)	7–7
Q2	6:52	UW	Travis Hanson 24 yard field goal	UW 10-7
Q2	3:29	UW	Travis Hanson 23 yard field goal	UW 13-7
Q3	5:27	UW	Mark Bruener 5 yard pass from Billy Joe Hobert (Aaron Pierce 3 yard pass from Billy Joe Hobert)	UW 21–7
Q4	14:21	UW	Aaron Pierce 2 yard pass from Billy Joe Hobert (kick failed)	UW 27–7
Q4	13:12	UW	Mario Bailey 38 pass from Mark Brunell (Travis Hanson kick)	UW 34–7
Q4	10:34	UM	Tyrone Wheatley 53 yard run (J.D. Carlson kick)	UW 34-14

After a scoreless first quarter, the Huskies went ahead as Billy Joe Hobert faked to Beno Bryant and ran off left tackle for two yards and the touchdown. Howard, an electrifying player, would then add another clip to his collegiate highlight film on Michigan's ensuing drive as he snared a leaping, 35 yard reception over eventual NFL first round selection Dana Hall. Three plays later, Elvis Grbac connected with Walter Smith on a 9-yard touchdown pass. Two Travis Hanson field goals made the score 13-7 Huskies at halftime. Washington extended its lead in the third quarter on an 80-yard touchdown drive. Hobert completed a 5-yard td toss to Mark Bruener and the two point conversion to Aaron Pierce. Facing a 21–7 deficit, the Wolverines were again unable to manage a first down and were forced to punt. Excellent field position awaited the Washington offense again, with the ball resting on the Michigan 48. On the second play of the final quarter, Hobert gave a play-action fake and found Pierce in the back of the end zone for a 2-yard touchdown. The Wolverines found themselves trailing 21–7. Michigan started the next drive at their own 29 yard line. Michigan moved the ball out to the 38 yard line before a Grbac keeper on fourth and one was stopped Washington took only six seconds to find the end zone again. Mark Brunell hit Mario Bailey streaking down the right side for the Huskies final score of the game. Tyrone Wheatley, a freshman, capped off an outstanding afternoon (68 yards on 9 carries) and closed the scoring on a 53-yard touchdown run, and J.D. Carlson's 126th consecutive PAT.

== Personnel ==
=== Roster ===
1991 Michigan Wolverines football team roster
Players
Coaches
Offense

Pos.	#	Name	Class
WR	1	Derrick Alexander (injured)	Jr
WR	18	Matt Brady	Jr
QB	13	Jason Carr	Fr
G	68	Joe Cocozzo	Jr
QB	10	Todd Collins	Fr
G	69	Matt Elliott	Sr
C	51	Steve Everitt	Sr
QB	15	Elvis Grbac	Sr
WR	21	Desmond Howard	Sr
TE	88	Tony McGee	Jr
RB	12	Ricky Powers	So
OT	75	Greg Skrepenak	Sr
RB	6	Tyrone Wheatley	Fr

Defense

Pos.	#	Name	Class
LB	37	Erick Anderson	Sr
DT	97	Chris Hutchinson	Sr
S	20	Corwin Brown	Sr
LB	36	Steve Morrison	So
OLB	99	Randy Stark	Sr
OLB	51	William Steuk	Jr
OLB	85	Charlie Stumb	So

Special teams

Pos.	#	Name	Class
K	38	J. D. Carlson	Sr

Head coach

- Gary Moeller

Coordinators/assistant coaches

- Darryl Bullock – Graduate assistant
- Lloyd Carr – Defensive coordinator
- Cam Cameron – Quarterbacks/Wide receivers
- Les Miles – Offensive line

Legend

- (C) Team captain
- (S) Suspended
- (I) Ineligible
- Injured
- Redshirt

Roster

=== Coaching staff ===
- Head coach: Gary Moeller
- Assistant coaches: Darryl Bullock, Tirrel Burton, Cam Cameron, Lloyd Carr, Jerry Hanlon, Bill Harris, Jim Herrmann, Les Miles, Bobby Morrison, Tom Reed
- Trainer: Paul Schmidt
- Managers: Brian Bickner, Scott Hanel, David Henderson, Marc Jacobson, Andy Riegler, Dave Schueler, Lance Satterthwaite, Mark Vainisi, Michael Weiskopf

== Statistics ==
=== Team statistics ===
On offense, Michigan gained an average of 246.3 rushing yards and 192.9 passing yards per game. The team led the Big Ten in rushing offense both in conference games (264.6 yards per game) and all games (231.9 yards per game). They also led the Big Ten in passing efficiency for both conference games (166.5) and all games (154.7). They were the conference leader in total offense both for conference games (453.6 yards per game) and all games (419.8 yards per game). They also led the Big Ten in scoring for conference games (39.5 points per game) and all games (35.0 points per game).

On defense, Michigan held opponents to 103.8 rushing yards and 218.5 passing yards per game. The team earned the second of four consecutive and six 1990s Big Ten rushing defense statistical championships for all games by holding opponents to 105.4 yards per game. The team also earned the first of five consecutive and six 1990s Big Ten rushing defense statistical championships for conference games by holding opponents to 102.0 yards per game. The team led the Big Ten Conference in scoring defense for conference games (11.4 points per game), while Iowa led for all games.

Michigan led the Big Ten in turnover margin (+1.13) in conference games and (+0.92) in all games. They also led the conference in punt return average in conference games (16.3 yards per return) and all games (14.7).

=== Individual statistics ===
Passing. Quarterback Elvis Grbac completed 152 of 228 passes (66.7%) for 1,955 yards, 24 touchdowns, five interceptions, and a 169.0 passer rating. Grbac won the first of his back-to-back passing efficiency NCAA Division I FBS championships. He also won his second of three consecutive Big Ten passing statistical championships (177.8 passing efficiency in conference games and 161.7 in all games).

Grbac surpassed his standing single-season Michigan record of 21 set in 1989 with 25 touchdown passes the following year. His junior year total of 54 touchdown passes set a school record, eclipsing Rick Leach's 48 set in 1978. He also tied Jim Harbaugh's 1986 single-season completion percentage record of 65.0, surpassed the following year by Todd Collins. On September 14, his 20–22 performance against Notre Dame established the standing single-game completion percentage, eclipsing his then standing September 16, 1989 17–21 performance against Notre Dame.

Rushing. Ricky Powers led the team in rushing with 1,187 yards on 230 carries an average of 5.2 yards per carry. The team's other leaders were Jesse Johnson (604 yards, 5.9-yard average), Tyrone Wheatley (408 yards, 6-2-yard average), Burnie Legette (213 yards (5.0-yard average), and Desmond Howard (165 yards, 13.8-yard average).

Receiving. Desmond Howard was the team's leading receiver with 61 catches for 950 yards and an average of 15.6 yards per reception. The team's other leading receivers were Yale Van Dyne (35 receptions for 478 yards) and Jesse Johnson (15 receptions for 175 yards).

Howard surpassed Anthony Carter's 11-year-old conference single-season record of 14 touchdown receptions by totaling 19. During the season, Howard extended his consecutive games with a touchdown reception streak to 13 games, surpassing Carter's streak of nine games, set in 1980.

Howard repeated as Big Ten receiving yardage champion for all games with 82.1 yards per game and he won his conference games yardage championship with an average of 90.1 yards per game.

Scoring. The team's scoring leaders were Desmond Howard (138 points on 23 touchdowns), J.D. Carlson (78 points on 50 extra points and 10 field goals), Ricky Powers (54 points), Tyrone Wheatley (48 points), and Jesse Johnson (42 points).

Howard was also the Big Ten scoring champion with an average of 11.3 points per game in conference games and 11.5 points per game overall.

Kicking J. D. Carlson established the current Big Ten record for consecutive successful point after touchdown conversions at 126.

== Awards and honors ==
Desmond Howard. Flanker/returner Desmond Howard dominated college football's 1991 major awards:

- Howard won the Heisman Trophy with the second largest vote total in the history of the award. He received 640 of 917 first-place votes and 2,077 points in the voting. He defeated runner-up Casey Weldon by 1,574 points. Only O.J. Simpson in 1968 won the award by a larger margin.
- On December 7, at the College Football Awards Show, Howard was presented with the Maxwell Award as the outstanding player in the nation. He was the second Michigan player to receive the award, following Tom Harmon in 1940.
- Howard was a unanimous All-American, receiving first-team honors from all five official selectors: American Football Coaches Association (AFCA), Associated Press (AP), Football Writers Association of America (FWAA), United Press International (UPI), and the Walter Camp Football Foundation (WCFF).

Howard also won several other awards, inluding the Walter Camp Award (college football player of the year), Sporting News College Football Player of the Year, UPI College Football Player of the Year, Chic Harley Award (college football player of the year), Paul Warfield Trophy (nation's top college football wide receiver), Chicago Tribune Silver Football (Big Ten most valuable player), Big Ten Athlete of the Year (all sports), and Michigan's most valuable player award.

Erick Anderson. Inside linebacker Erick Anderson won the 1991 Butkus Award as the nation's top linebacker. He was the first Michigan player to win the award. Anderson was also the inaugural recipient of the Jack Lambert Trophy as the top collegiate linebacker. Anderson also received first-team All-America honors from the UPI.

Greg Skrepenak. Senior offensive tackle Greg Skrepenak was a unamious All-American, receiving first-team honors from all five official selectors. He was also the inaugural recipient of the Jim Parker Trophy as the top collegiate offensive lineman. He was also a finalist for the Outland Trophy as the top interior lineman, though he lost to Washington defensive tackle Steve Emtman. Skrepenak also received the Big Ten offensive lineman of the year award.

Anderson and Skrepenak were also co-captains of the 1991 team.

Matt Elliott. Guard Matt Elliott also received All-America honors from the College and Pro Football News.

Gary Moeller. Gary Moeller won the Big Ten Coach of the Year award, receiving 31 of 39 first-place votes in a poll of Midwest sportswriters and broadcasters.

All-Big Ten. Twelve Michigan players received first- or second-team honors on the 1991 All-Big Ten Conference football team: Howard (AP-1; Coaches-1); Grbac (AP-1; Coaches-2); Skrepenak (AP-1; Coaches-1); Anderson (AP-1; Coaches-1); running back Ricky Powers (AP-1; Coaches-2); guard Matt Elliott (AP-1; Coaches-1); defensive linemen Mike Evans (AP-1; Coaches-1) and Chris Hutchinson (Coaches-1); placekicker J. D. Carlson (AP-1; Coaches-2); defensive back Corwin Brown (AP-2; Coaches-2); guard Joe Cocozzo (AP-2, Coaches-2); and center Steve Everitt (AP-2, Coaches-2).

== 1992 NFL draft ==
The following players were claimed in the 1992 NFL draft.

Player	Position	Round	Pick	NFL team
Desmond Howard	Wide receiver	1	4	Washington Redskins
Greg Skrepenak	Tackle	2	32	Los Angeles Raiders
Mike Evans	DT	4	101	Kansas City Chiefs
Erick Anderson	Linebacker	7	186	Kansas City Chiefs
Brian Townsend	Linebacker	11	181	Los Angeles Rams
Matt Elliott	Center	12	336	Washington Redskins
