= Lincoln Kennedy =

American football player and broadcaster (born 1971)

No. 66, 75, 72
- Position: Offensive tackle

Personal information
- Born: February 12, 1971 (age 55); York, Pennsylvania, U.S.
- Listed height: 6 ft 6 in (1.98 m)
- Listed weight: 335 lb (152 kg)

Career information
- High school: Morse (San Diego, California)
- College: Washington (1989–1992)
- NFL draft: 1993: 1st round, 9th overall pick

Career history
- Atlanta Falcons (1993–1995); Oakland Raiders (1996–2003); Tampa Bay Storm (2007–2010)

Awards and highlights
- First-team All-Pro (2002); Second-team All-Pro (2001); 3× Pro Bowl (2000–2002); PFWA All-Rookie Team (1993); National champion (1991); Jim Parker Trophy (1992); 2× Morris Trophy (1991, 1992); Unanimous All-American (1992); Third-team All-American (1991); 2× First-team All-Pac-10 (1991, 1992); Second-team All-Pac-10 (1990)

Career NFL statistics
- Games played: 169
- Games started: 141
- Fumble recoveries: 9
- Stats at Pro Football Reference
- Stats at ArenaFan.com
- College Football Hall of Fame

Tamerlane Lincoln Kennedy (born Tamerlane Fizel Kennedy Jr., February 12, 1971) is an American former professional football player who was an offensive tackle who played in the National Football League (NFL). He played college football for the Washington Huskies, and was recognized as a unanimous All-American in 1992.

A first-round selection in the 1993 NFL draft, Kennedy played eleven seasons in the NFL for the Atlanta Falcons and Oakland Raiders, then three years for the Tampa Bay Storm of the Arena Football League (AFL). He is currently a broadcaster for the Las Vegas Raiders and Premiere Radio Networks.

== Early life ==
Born in York, Pennsylvania, Kennedy grew up in the southeast part of San Diego, California. His birth name was Tamerlane Fizel Kennedy Jr., but his mother called him "Little (Abraham) Lincoln", referring to their shared birthday (February 12). The nickname stuck, and Lincoln had it legally changed after college. He graduated from San Diego's Samuel F. B. Morse High School in 1988, where he played football for the Morse Tigers.

== College career ==
Kennedy attended the University of Washington in Seattle, where he played for the Huskies under head coach Don James. After redshirting as a true freshman in 1988, he was switched from defense to offense. In 1991 and 1992, he was the recipient of the Morris Trophy, awarded annually to the outstanding offensive lineman in the Pacific-10 Conference. As a senior, he was a consensus first-team All-American in 1992, and started in his third consecutive Rose Bowl; a year earlier, the Huskies went undefeated and shared the national championship (with Miami).

Kennedy was inducted into the College Football Hall of Fame in 2015. He was inducted into the Rose Bowl Hall of Fame in 2023.

== Professional career ==
=== Atlanta Falcons ===
Pre-draft measurables
Height	Weight	Arm length	Hand span
6 ft 6 in (1.98 m)	358 lb (162 kg)	36 1/8 in (0.92 m)	10 in (0.25 m)

Kennedy was the ninth overall pick in the first round of the 1993 NFL draft, taken by the Atlanta Falcons. He started at left guard throughout his rookie season in 1993, but lost the job the following year to veteran free agent Dave Richards, out of UCLA.

=== Oakland Raiders ===
After a disappointing 1995 season, Kennedy was traded to the Oakland Raiders in exchange for a fifth-round pick in the 1997 NFL draft, where he started at right tackle in all but three games of his first seven seasons there. In November 1999, during a Monday night game against the Denver Broncos at Mile High Stadium, Kennedy went after a fan who hit him in the face with a snowball. As a member of the Raiders, Kennedy was named to three consecutive Pro Bowls and anchored the offensive line in Super Bowl XXXVII.

After leaving the field in 2004, Kennedy's degree in speech communications prepared him to accept a position with the NFL Network as one of the hosts of NFL Total Access.

In 2005, his attempted comeback with the Dallas Cowboys failed, due to his inability to pass the team physical.

=== Tampa Bay Storm ===
In 2007, 2008, and 2010, he played for the Tampa Bay Storm in the Arena Football League.

== Broadcasting ==
Kennedy currently works for Fox Sports Radio as show co-host. He is also a co-host on Las Vegas radio station Raider Nation Radio 920 AM. He has called Pac-12 college football games as the color analyst and as a track reporter during NASCAR races. In 2013, he joined the Oakland Raiders radio broadcast team at Compass Media Networks; he was promoted to color commentator in 2018, partnered with play-by-play announcer Brent Musburger. On Saturday morning, April 17, 2021, Kennedy announced that he would go on hiatus from his Fox Sports Radio assignment.

== Other appearances ==
Kennedy made an appearance on Arliss in 2000 (Episode: 504: "Comings and Goings"), and appeared in Two and a Half Men in 2005, ("Principal Gallagher's Lesbian Lover"). He appears as himself in the 2006 film The Marine.

== Personal life ==
His son, Zach Banner, was born in December 1993, and is an offensive tackle. While Banner is his biological son, he was raised by Ron Banner, who married his son's mother and legally adopted him. Banner had no idea who Lincoln Kennedy was, or that he was his real father, until he was in seventh grade.

Once, not long after the death of John F. Kennedy Jr., Kennedy made the remark on ESPN's SportsCenter that "My name's Lincoln Kennedy, I ain't got a chance," in reference to the assassination of Presidents Abraham Lincoln and John F. Kennedy.

Kennedy held the all-time record on the "Wall of Fame" at Seattle eatery Shultzy's Sausage before the restaurant changed locations and did away with the Wall. In his record-setting effort, he consumed 11 of the restaurant's signature link sausages on French rolls and a large Coca-Cola within one hour.

== See also ==
- List of Arena Football League and National Football League players
