= 1992 Rose Bowl =

American college football game

Coordinates: 34.161°N 118.168°W

- 78th Rose Bowl Game
Washington Huskies	Michigan Wolverines
(11–0)	(10–1)
34	14
Head coach: Don James	Head coach: Gary Moeller
AP / Coaches; 2 / 1	AP / Coaches; 4 / 3
	1	2	3	4	Total
Washington	0	13	8	13	34
Michigan	0	7	0	7	14
- Date: January 1, 1992
- Season: 1991
- Stadium: Rose Bowl
- Location: Pasadena, California
- Players of the Game: Steve Emtman (DT); Billy Joe Hobert (QB)
- Favorite: Washington by 7 points
- National anthem: UW Marching Band
- Referee: Jimmy Harper (SEC)
- Halftime show: UW Marching Band, UM Marching Band
- Attendance: 103,566

United States TV coverage
- Network: ABC
- Announcers: Keith Jackson; Bob Griese

The 1992 Rose Bowl was a college football bowl game played on January 1, 1992, the 78th Rose Bowl Game. Before 103,566 in attendance in Pasadena, California, and a national television audience, the No. 2 Washington Huskies defeated the No. 4 Michigan Wolverines, 34–14.

Washington defensive tackle Steve Emtman and quarterback Billy Joe Hobert were named the Players Of The Game. The undefeated Washington Huskies were named the national champions by the Coaches Poll after being left at No. 2 in the AP poll, behind the Miami Hurricanes.

== Pre-game activities ==
On October 22, 1991, the Tournament of Roses selected 17-year-old Tannis Ann Turrentine, a senior at Mayfield Senior School and a resident of Pasadena, as the 74th Rose Queen of the 103rd Tournament of Roses. The 1991–92 Tournament of Roses Royal Court was led by the reigning Rose Queen with six rose princesses: Laurie Fortier, San Marino; Malia Herndon, Altadena; Erin Christine Mispagel, Pasadena; Mia Rodinella, Pasadena; Kristen Colleen Russell, La Canada Flintridge; and Melissa Ann Tyson, Pasadena.

== Game summary ==
After a scoreless first quarter, a 7–7 tie in the second, and 13–7 Husky advantage at halftime, the 1992 game became the most lopsided contest between two top-5 teams in Rose Bowl history. Trailing 34–7, a late Michigan touchdown against Husky reserves closed the gap in the final score to 20 points. With a minute remaining and the third-string quarterback leading the offense, Washington opted to run out the clock from the Michigan five-yard line, rather than run up the score.

This was the first Rose Bowl since the beginning of the Big Ten–Pacific 10 (originally the Pacific Coast Conference) contract that officials from a neutral conference (in this case, the Southeastern Conference) were used. From 1947 through 1991, a split crew of Big Ten and Pac-10 (Pac-8/AAWU/PCC; now Pac-12) officials were used. From 1984, the first year a seven-man officiating crew was used, through 1991, the conference of the designated home team provided the referee, back judge, one wing official on the line of scrimmage (head linesman or line judge) and one deep wing official (field judge or side judge), and the other conference provided the umpire, one wing official on the line of scrimmage and one deep wing official. The Rose Bowl was the last bowl to use split officiating crews; most bowl games abandoned them in favor of neutral officials in the 1970s, although the Orange Bowl used a split crew from the SEC and Big Ten for its 1978 game.

Split crews were banned by the NCAA starting in 1999.

=== Scoring ===
==== First quarter ====
None, tied 0–0

==== Second quarter ====
Wash. - Hobert, 2-yard run (Hanson kick) - Wash. 7–0
Mich. - Smith, 9-yard pass from Grbac (Carlson kick) - tied 7–7
Wash. - Hanson, 24-yard field goal - Wash. 10–7
Wash. - Hanson, 23-yard field goal - Wash. 13–7

==== Third quarter ====
Wash. - Bruener, 5-yard pass from Hobert (Pierce, pass from Hobert, 2 pts.) - Wash. 21–7

==== Fourth quarter ====
Wash. - Pierce, 2-yard pass from Hobert (kick failed) - Wash. 27–7
Wash. - Bailey, 38-yard pass from Brunell (Hanson kick) - Wash. 34–7
Mich. - Wheatley, 53-yard run (Carlson kick) - Wash. 34–14

== Split national championship ==
Miami won by only four points in the final AP Poll, while Washington won by nine points in the Coaches' Poll.

A fantasy article in Sports Illustrated titled "The Dream Game" had the Huskies narrowly defeat Miami in a playoff.
