= 1991 Washington Huskies football team =

American college football season

1991 Washington Huskies football
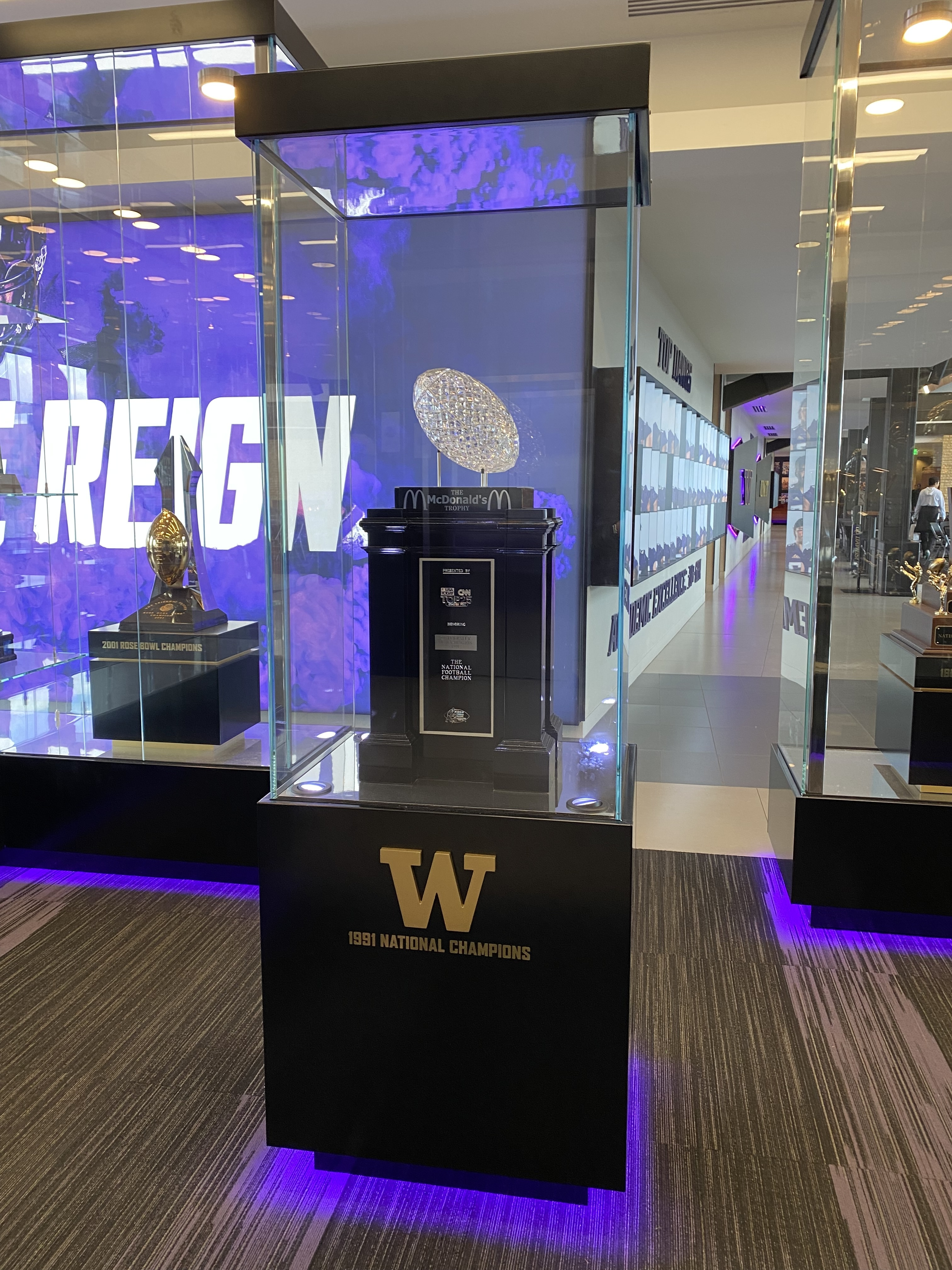

Coaches' Poll national champion FWAA national champion NFF national champion Pac-10 champion Rose Bowl champion

Rose Bowl, W 34–14 vs. Michigan
- Conference: Pacific-10 Conference

Ranking
- Coaches: No. 1
- AP: No. 2
- Record: 12–0 (8–0 Pac-10)
- Head coach: Don James (17th season)
- Offensive coordinator: Keith Gilbertson (1st season)
- Offensive scheme: Single set back
- Defensive coordinator: Jim Lambright (14th season)
- Base defense: 3–4
- MVPs: Mario Bailey (offense); Steve Emtman (defense)
- Captains: Mario Bailey; Brett Collins; Ed Cunningham; Donald Jones
- Home stadium: Husky Stadium

1991 Pacific-10 Conference football standings
	Conf.					Overall
Team	W		L		T	W		L		T
No. 1 Washington $	8	–	0	–	0	12	–	0	–	0
No. 7 California	6	–	2	–	0	10	–	2	–	0
No. 18 UCLA	6	–	2	–	0	9	–	3	–	0
No. 22 Stanford	6	–	2	–	0	8	–	4	–	0
Arizona State	4	–	4	–	0	6	–	5	–	0
Arizona	3	–	5	–	0	4	–	7	–	0
Washington State	3	–	5	–	0	4	–	7	–	0
USC	2	–	6	–	0	3	–	8	–	0
Oregon	1	–	7	–	0	3	–	8	–	0
Oregon State	1	–	7	–	0	1	–	10	–	0
$ – Conference champion; Rankings from Coaches Poll

The 1991 Washington Huskies football team represented the University of Washington in the 1991 NCAA Division I-A football season. Head coach Don James, in his 17th season at Washington, was assisted by coordinators Keith Gilbertson (offense) and Jim Lambright (defense), both head coaches themselves within two years.

The 1991 team was arguably the finest team in school history and split the national championship with the Miami Hurricanes, who were also 12–0, and won the AP Poll by four votes, while Washington took the coaches' poll by nine. Washington could not have played Miami in a bowl game because the Pac-10 champion was bound by contract to play in the Rose Bowl against the Big Ten champion. The Huskies soundly defeated fourth-ranked Michigan 34–14 in the Rose Bowl; the final score differential was narrowed by a late touchdown by Tyrone Wheatley of Michigan. With a minute remaining in the game, Washington was on the Michigan five-yard line, but opted to stay on the ground and run out the clock with third-string quarterback Eric Bjornson leading the offense.

Eleven Huskies were selected in the 1992 NFL draft, led by Steve Emtman, a dominating yet under-recruited defensive tackle from Cheney. Emtman won both the Lombardi Award and the Outland Trophy, and finished fourth in the Heisman Trophy balloting, won by Desmond Howard of Michigan. Defensive back Dana Hall was also selected in the first round.

A fantasy article in Sports Illustrated titled "The Dream Game" had the Huskies narrowly defeat Miami in a playoff.

== Overview ==
The Huskies were ranked fourth in the 1991 pre-season. They dominated their six home games within the confines of Husky Stadium, which included two lopsided shutouts. The Dawgs' three closest games in 1991 were on the road: against Nebraska, California, and USC.

Behind 14–6 at halftime in Lincoln on ABC to no. 9 Nebraska in the second game of the season, UW rallied to outscore NU in Lincoln 30–7 in the second half to win by 15, and were graciously applauded at game-end by the Cornhusker fans. In mid-October, the no. 7 Cal Bears were the next-best team in the Pac-10 in 1991; the Huskies won by a touchdown in Berkeley to go to 6–0. In November in Los Angeles, the Huskies entered the game against USC undefeated at 8–0 and won a 14–3 defensive struggle, a second-straight victory over the previously dominant Trojans.

Like the rest of the Pac-10 in 1991, the Huskies played just eight Pac-10 conference games, missing one opponent; they did not play UCLA in 1991 or 1992. The 1991 Bruins finished at 9–3 (6–2 in conference), in the top twenty in both polls (no. 18 and no. 19). UCLA lost to Tennessee of the SEC and both Bay Area teams, Cal and Stanford, but won their bowl game.

== Schedule ==
Date	Time	Opponent	Rank	Site	TV	Result	Attendance	Source
September 7	12:30 p.m.	at Stanford	No. 4	Stanford Stadium; Stanford, CA	ABC	W 42–7	45,273	
September 21	5:00 p.m.	at No. 9 Nebraska*	No. 4	Memorial Stadium; Lincoln, NE	ABC	W 36–21	76,304	
September 28	12:30 p.m.	Kansas State*	No. 4	Husky Stadium; Seattle, WA	Prime	W 56–3	71,638	
October 5	3:30 p.m.	Arizona	No. 3	Husky Stadium; Seattle, WA	Prime	W 54–0	72,495	
October 12	12:30 p.m.	Toledo*	No. 3	Husky Stadium; Seattle, WA	Prime	W 48–0	72,266	
October 19	12:30 p.m.	at No. 7 California	No. 3	California Memorial Stadium; Berkeley, CA	ABC	W 24–17	74,500	
October 26	12:30 p.m.	Oregon	No. 3	Husky Stadium; Seattle, WA (rivalry)	Prime	W 29–7	72,318	
November 2	12:30 p.m.	Arizona State	No. 3	Husky Stadium; Seattle, WA	Prime	W 44–16	72,405	
November 9	12:30 p.m.	at USC	No. 2	Los Angeles Memorial Coliseum; Los Angeles, CA	ABC	W 14–3	59,320	
November 16	1:00 p.m.	at Oregon State	No. 3	Parker Stadium; Corvallis, OR	Prime	W 58–6	31,588	
November 23	12:30 p.m.	Washington State	No. 2	Husky Stadium; Seattle, WA (Apple Cup)	ABC	W 56–21	72,581	
January 1, 1992	1:45 p.m.	vs. No. 4 Michigan*	No. 2	Rose Bowl; Pasadena, CA (Rose Bowl)	ABC	W 34–14	103,566	
*Non-conference game; Rankings from AP Poll released prior to the game; All times are in Pacific time; Source:

== Rankings ==
Ranking movements Legend: ██ Increase in ranking ██ Decrease in ranking т = Tied with team above or below ( ) = First-place votes
	Week															
Poll	Pre	1	2	3	4	5	6	7	8	9	10	11	12	13	14	Final
AP	4 (1)	4 (2)	4 (2)	4 (1)	4 (3)	3 (1)	3 (1)	3 (2)	3 (2)	3 (4)	2 т (4)	3 (4)	2 (14)	2 (22 1/2)	2 (23)	2 (28)
Coaches	4 (3)	4 (3)	3 (2)	4 (1)	4 (1)	3 (1)	3 (1)	3 (1)	3 (2)	3 (2)	3 (8)	3 (8)	2 (15)	2 (27)	1 (29)	1 (33 1/2)

== Game summaries ==
=== At Stanford ===
#4 Washington at Stanford

Team	1	2	3	4	Total
• Washington	0	21	0	21	42
Stanford	0	7	0	0	7

- Date: September 7
- Location: Stanford Stadium, Stanford, CA
- Game start: 12:30 pm PDT
- TV announcers (ABC): Keith Jackson and Bob Griese

Scoring summary
Q2	13:45	UW	Jay Barry 11 yard run (Travis Hanson kick)	UW 7–0
Q2	9:43	UW	Beno Bryant (Travis Hanson kick)	UW 14–0
Q2	2:02	STAN	Tommy Vardell 1 yard run (Aaron Mills kick)	UW 14–7
Q2	0:09	UW	Mario Bailey 26 yard pass from Billy Joe Hobert (Travis Hanson kick)	UW 21–7
Q4	14:02	UW	Joe Kralik 20 yard pass from Billy Joe Hobert (Travis Hanson kick)	UW 28–7
Q4	11:59	UW	Jay Barry 20 yard run (Travis Hanson kick)	UW 35–7
Q4	1:30	UW	Leif Johnson 20 yard run (Travis Hanson kick)	UW 42–7

Washington's forced five turnovers and scored four touchdowns on the ground in a 42–7 season opening victory at Stanford. Cornerback Walter Bailey had an interception and a fumble recovery, while running back Jay Barry ran for two scores. Billy Joe Hobert, making his first career start, completed 21 of 31 passes for 244 yards and two touchdowns.

=== At Nebraska ===
No. 4 Washington Huskies (1–0) at No. 9 Nebraska Cornhuskers (2–0) – Game summary

Quarter	1	2	3	4	Total
No. 4 Huskies	0	6	10	20	36
No. 9 Cornhuskers	7	7	7	0	21

at Memorial Stadium • Lincoln, NE

- Date: September 21, 1991
- Game time: 5:00 p.m. PDT
- Game weather: Clear • Temperature: 74 °F (23 °C) • Wind:
- Game attendance: 76,304
- Referee: John Laurie
- TV announcers (ABC): Keith Jackson (play-by-play), Bob Griese (analyst) and Jack Arute (sideline reporter)

Statistics	UW	NEB
First downs	31	15
Total yards	618	308
Rushes/yards	47–335	36–135
Passing yards	283	173
Passing: Comp–Att–Int	23–40–2	12–29–2
Punting	5–41.0	9–44.3
Fumbles–Lost	3–1	1–1
Penalties–Yards	8–91	4–29
Time of possession	35:38	24:22

Team	Category	Player	Statistics
Washington	Passing		
Washington	Rushing		
Washington	Receiving		
Nebraska	Passing		
Nebraska	Rushing		
Nebraska	Receiving		

Scoring summary

Quarter	Time	Drive			Team	Scoring information	Score	
Quarter	Time	Plays	Yards	TOP	Team	Scoring information	Washington	Nebraska
1	8:41	6	45		Nebraska	D. Brown 27-yard touchdown run, Bennett kick good	0	7
2	9:07	10	98		Washington	Hobert 9-yard touchdown run, Hanson kick no good	6	7
2	3:40	5	51		Nebraska	Bostick 42-yard touchdown reception from McCant, Bennett kick good	6	14
3	12:27	8	51		Washington	43-yard field goal by Hanson	9	14
3	85:32	1	2		Nebraska	D. Brown 2-yard touchdown run, Bennett kick good	9	21
3	0:19	12	76		Washington	Bryant 15-yard touchdown run, Hanson kick good	16	21
4	11:20	6	69		Washington	McKay 8-yard touchdown reception from Hobert, 2-point pass incomplete	22	21
4	7:26	8	33		Washington	Hobertt 3-yard touchdown run, Hanson kick good	29	21
4	5:38	3	79		Washington	J. Barry 81-yard touchdown run, Hanson kick good	36	21
"TOP" = time of possession. For other American football terms, see Glossary of American football.							36	20

=== Kansas State ===
Kansas State Wildcats (3–0) at No. 4 Washington Huskies (2–0) – Game summary

Quarter	1	2	3	4	Total
Wildcats	0	3	0	0	3
No. 3 Huskies	20	15	7	14	56

at Husky Stadium • Seattle, WA

- Date: September 28, 1991
- Game time: 12:30 p.m. PDT
- Game weather: Overcast • Temperature: 62 °F (17 °C) • Wind:
- Game attendance: 71,368
- TV announcers (Prime Sports Northwest): Don Poier (play-by-play) and Chuck Nelson (analyst)

Statistics	KSU	UW
First downs	15	23
Total yards	253	478
Rushes/yards	30–-17	41–238
Passing yards	270	240
Passing: Comp–Att–Int	21–32–4	14–22–1
Punting	6–40.3	1–40.0
Fumbles–Lost	3–1	0–0
Penalties–Yards	7–44	5–30
Time of possession	33:12	26:48

Team	Category	Player	Statistics
Kansas State	Passing		
Kansas State	Rushing		
Kansas State	Receiving		
Washington	Passing		
Washington	Rushing		
Washington	Receiving		

Scoring summary

Quarter	Time	Drive			Team	Scoring information	Score	
Quarter	Time	Plays	Yards	TOP	Team	Scoring information	Kansas State	Washington
1	13:08	6	45		Washington	J. Barry 3-yard touchdown run, Hanson kick good	0	7
1	10:12	5	87		Washington	M. Bailey 71-yard touchdown reception from Hobert, Hanson kick no good	0	13
1	3:21	7	58		Washington	Bryant 4-yard touchdown run, Hanson kick good	0	20
2	12:29	7	79		Washington	J. Barry 11-yard touchdown run, Hanson kick good	0	27
2	3:45	2	35		Washington	McKay 28-yard touchdown reception from Hobert, 2-point pass good	0	35
2	0:00	9	50		Kansas State	42-yard field goal by Wright	3	35
3	4:08	9	80		Washington	M. Bailey 32-yard touchdown reception from Hobert, Crabbe kick good	3	42
4	11:05	—	—	—	Washington	Bryant 53-yard punt return for a touchdown, Jason Crabbe kick good	3	49
4	6:39	2	8		Washington	Kaufman 3-yard touchdown run, Crabbe kick good	3	56
"TOP" = time of possession. For other American football terms, see Glossary of American football.							3	56

=== Arizona ===
Arizona Wildcats (2–2) at No. 3 Washington Huskies (3–0) – Game summary

Quarter	1	2	3	4	Total
Wildcats	0	0	0	0	0
No. 3 Huskies	7	27	14	6	54

at Husky Stadium • Seattle, WA

- Date: October 5, 1991
- Game time: 3:30 p.m. PDT
- Game weather: Clear • Temperature: 74 °F (23 °C) • Wind:
- Game attendance: 72,495
- Referee: Gordon Riese
- TV announcers (Prime Network): Phil Stone (play-by-play), Don Heinrich (analyst) and Gene Washington (sideline reporter)

Statistics	UA	UW
First downs	9	25
Total yards	142	445
Rushes/yards	43–30	53–280
Passing yards	112	165
Passing: Comp–Att–Int	8–17–2	10–22–0
Punting	9–37.8	5–35.8
Fumbles–Lost	5–5	1–0
Penalties–Yards	9–71	3–30
Time of possession	27:33	32:27

Team	Category	Player	Statistics
Arizona	Passing		
Arizona	Rushing		
Arizona	Receiving		
Washington	Passing		
Washington	Rushing		
Washington	Receiving		

Scoring summary

Quarter	Time	Drive			Team	Scoring information	Score	
Quarter	Time	Plays	Yards	TOP	Team	Scoring information	Arizona	Washington
1	7:15	5	34		Washington	J. Barry 13-yard touchdown run, Hanson kick good	0	7
2	12:24	7	70		Washington	Hobert 1-yard touchdown run, Hanson kick good	0	14
2	8:11	7	51		Washington	M. Bailey 29-yard touchdown reception from Brunell, Hanson kick good	0	21
2	4:57	4	12		Washington	M. Jones 2-yard touchdown run, Hanson kick good	0	28
2	4:00	–	–	–	Washington	Interception returned 24 yards for touchdown by W. Bailey, Hanson kick no good	0	34
3	10:16	6	53		Washington	M. Bailey 23-yard touchdown reception from Brunell, Crabbe kick good	0	41
3	2:46	3	54		Washington	Bryant 13-yard touchdown run, Crabbe kick good	0	48
4	8:25	6	46		Washington	Kaufman 9-yard touchdown run, Crabbe kick no good	0	54
"TOP" = time of possession. For other American football terms, see Glossary of American football.							0	54

=== Toledo ===
Toledo at #3 Washington

Team	1	2	3	4	Total
Toledo	0	0	0	0	0
• Washington	21	13	7	7	48

- Date: October 12
- Location: Husky Stadium, Seattle, WA
- Game start: 12:30 pm PDT
- Game attendance: 72,266
- TV announcers (Prime Sports Northwest): Don Poier and Chuck Nelson

Scoring summary
Q1	11:22	UW	Mario Bailey 28 yard pass from Billy Joe Hobert (Jason Crabbe kick)	UW 7–0
Q1	7:08	UW	Mario Bailey 4 yard pass from Billy Joe Hobert (Jason Crabbe kick)	UW 14–0
Q1	3:32	UW	Matt Jones 2 yard run (Jason Crabbe kick)	UW 21–0
Q2	14:42	UW	Mario Bailey 70 yard pass from Billy Joe Hobert (kick failed)	UW 27–0
Q2	9:04	UW	Jay Barry 2 yard run (Jason Crabbe kick)	UW 34–0
Q3	2:13	UW	Jay Barry 32 yard pass from Mark Brunell (Jason Crabbe kick)	UW41–0
Q4	3:03	UW	Eric Bjornson 9 yard run (Jason Crabbe kick)	UW 48–0

=== At California ===
No. 3 Washington Huskies (5–0) at No. 7 California Golden Bears (5–0) – Game summary

Quarter	1	2	3	4	Total
No. 3 Huskies	7	10	0	7	24
No. 7 Golden Bears	7	3	7	0	17

at Memorial Stadium • Berkeley, CA

- Date: October 19, 1991
- Game time: 12:30 p.m. PDT
- Game weather: Sunny • Temperature: 68 °F (20 °C) • Wind:
- Game attendance: 74,500
- TV announcers (ABC): Brent Musburger (play-by-play), Dick Vermeil (analyst) and Cheryl Miller (sideline reporter)

Statistics	UW	UC
First downs	21	15
Total yards	441	329
Rushes/yards	43–252	36–114
Passing yards	189	215
Passing: Comp–Att–Int	15–34–1	18–41–2
Punting	7–43.3	7–42.4
Fumbles–Lost	4–0	2–0
Penalties–Yards	8–71	5–34
Time of possession	29:13	30:47

Team	Category	Player	Statistics
Washington	Passing		
Washington	Rushing		
Washington	Receiving		
California	Passing		
California	Rushing		
California	Receiving		

Scoring summary

Quarter	Time	Drive			Team	Scoring information	Score	
Quarter	Time	Plays	Yards	TOP	Team	Scoring information	Washington	California
1	2:30	3	59		California	Dawkins 59-yard touchdown reception from Pawlawski, Brien kick good	0	7
1	0:58	5	80		Washington	M. Bailey 36-yard touchdown reception from Hobert, Hanson kick good	7	7
2	10:07	14	57		Washington	23-yard field goal by Hanson	10	7
2	5:08	13	47		California	18-yard field goal by Brien	10	10
2	0:49	4	67		Washington	J. Barry 9-yard touchdown run, Hanson kick good	17	10
3	0:01	2	80		California	Chapman 68-yard touchdown run, Brien kick good	17	17
4	13:56	2	64		Washington	Bryant 65-yard touchdown run, Hanson kick good	24	17
"TOP" = time of possession. For other American football terms, see Glossary of American football.							24	17

=== Oregon ===
Oregon at #3 Washington

Team	1	2	3	4	Total
Oregon	0	0	0	7	7
• Washington	7	12	3	7	29

- Date: October 26
- Location: Husky Stadium, Seattle, WA
- Game start: 12:30 pm PDT
- Game attendance: 72,318
- Game weather: Cloudy
- TV announcers (Prime Sports Northwest): Don Poier and Chuck Nelson

Scoring summary
Q1	4:44	UW	Mario Bailey 18 yard pass from Billy Joe Hobert (Travis Hanson kick)	UW 7–0
Q2	14:54	UW	Mario Bailey 29 yard pass from Billy Joe Hobert (kick failed)	UW13–0
Q2	10:50	UW	Travis Hanson 44 yard field goal	UW 16–0
Q2	5:01	UW	Travis Hanson 28 yard field goal	UW 19–0
Q3	0:33	UW	Travis Hanson 33 yard field goal	UW 22–0
Q4	6:20	UW	Orlando McKay 15 yard pass from Billy Joe Hobert (Travis Hanson kick)	UW 29–0
Q4	4:21	OR	Sean Burwell 25 yard run (Greg McCallum kick)	UW 29-7

=== Arizona State ===
Arizona State Sun Devils (4–3) at No. 3 Washington Huskies (7–0) – Game summary

Quarter	1	2	3	4	Total
Sun Devils	0	0	8	8	16
No. 3 Huskies	14	17	10	3	44

at Husky Stadium • Seattle, WA

- Date: November 2, 1991
- Game time: 12:30 p.m. PST
- Game weather: Sunny • Temperature: 52 °F (11 °C) • Wind:
- Game attendance: 72,405
- TV announcers (Prime Sports Northwest): Don Poier (play-by-play) and Chuck Nelson (analyst)

Statistics	ASU	UW
First downs	17	23
Total yards	231	489
Rushes/yards	19–78	51–177
Passing yards	153	312
Passing: Comp–Att–Int	19–42–1	25–37–0
Punting	7–36.6	3–37.0
Fumbles–Lost	2–2	0–0
Penalties–Yards	7–45	13–103
Time of possession	23:13	36:47

Team	Category	Player	Statistics
Arizona State	Passing		
Arizona State	Rushing		
Arizona State	Receiving		
Washington	Passing		
Washington	Rushing		
Washington	Receiving		

Scoring summary

Quarter	Time	Drive			Team	Scoring information	Score	
Quarter	Time	Plays	Yards	TOP	Team	Scoring information	Arizona State	Washington
1	11:23	7	33		Washington	McKay 9-yard touchdown reception from Hobert, Hanson kick good	0	7
1	8:55	5	16		Washington	J. Barry 1-yard touchdown run, Hanson kick good	0	14
2	14:56	5	18		Washington	J. Barry 5-yard touchdown run, Hanson kick good	0	21
2	12:13	4	42		Washington	M. Bailey 15-yard touchdown reception from Hobert, Hanson kick good	0	28
2	1:42	13	62		Washington	18-yard field goal by Hanson	0	31
3	12:52	7	83		Washington	Turner 1-yard touchdown run, Hanson kick good	0	38
3	4:37	9	55		Washington	27-yard field goal by Hanson	0	41
3	0:37	9	57		Arizona State	Snyder 11-yard touchdown reception from Powers, 2-point pass good	8	41
4	9:02	9	52		Arizona State	Davison 1-yard touchdown run, 2-point run good	16	41
4	3:05	11	58		Washington	30-yard field goal by Hanson	16	44
"TOP" = time of possession. For other American football terms, see Glossary of American football.							16	44

=== At USC ===
#2 Washington at USC

Team	1	2	3	4	Total
• Washington	7	7	0	0	14
USC	0	0	3	0	3

- Date: November 9
- Location: Los Angeles Memorial Coliseum, Los Angeles, CA
- Game start: 12:30 pm PDT
- Game attendance: 59,320
- Game weather: Sunny
- TV announcers (ABC): Keith Jackson and Bob Griese

Scoring summary
Q1	7:22	UW	Beno Bryant 55 yard run (Travis Hanson kick)	UW 7–0
Q2	4:22	UW	Beno Bryant 9 yard run (Travis Hanson kick)	UW 14–0
Q3	2:04	USC	J.J. Dudum 23 yard field goal	UW 14–3

=== At Oregon State ===
#2 Washington at Oregon State

Team	1	2	3	4	Total
• Washington	16	28	14	0	58
Oregon State	3	3	0	0	6

- Date: November 16
- Location: Parker Stadium, Corvallis, OR
- Game start: 1:00 pm PDT
- Game attendance: 31,588
- Game weather: Rain
- Television network: Prime Sports Northwest

Scoring summary
Q1	12:39	OSU	Jamie Burke 33 yard field goal	OSU 3–0
Q1	8:31	UW	Mario Bailey 6 yard pass from Billy Joe Hobert (Travis Hanson kick)	UW 7–3
Q1	8:12	UW	Safety - Andy Mason tackles Chad Paulson -10 yard run	UW 9–3
Q1	7:11	UW	Mario Bailey 28 yard pass from Billy Joe Hobert (Travis Hanson kick)	UW 16–3
Q2	14:56	UW	Mario Bailey 19 yard pass from Billy Joe Hobert (Travis Hanson kick)	UW 23–3
Q2	10:18	UW	Napoleon Kaufman 9 yard run (Travis Hanson kick)	UW 30–3
Q2	3:03	UW	Billy Joe Hobert 11 yard run (Travis Hanson kick)	UW 37–3
Q2	2:30	OSU	Jamie Burke 41 yard field goal	UW 37–6
Q2	1:08	UW	Orlando McKay 18 yard pass from Billy Joe Hobert (Travis Hanson kick)	UW 44–6
Q3	0:58	UW	Napoleon Kaufman 1 yard run (Travis Hanson kick)	UW 51–6
Q3	0:00	UW	Darius Turner 5 yard run (Travis Hanson kick)	UW 58–6

=== Washington State ===
Washington State at #2 Washington

Team	1	2	3	4	Total
Washington State	7	0	7	7	21
• Washington	6	22	7	21	56

- Date: November 23
- Location: Husky Stadium, Seattle, WA
- Game start: 12:30 pm PDT
- Game attendance: 72,581
- Television network: ABC

Scoring summary
Q1	12:53	UW	Orlando McKay 69 yard pass from Billy Joe Hobert (kick failed)	UW 6–0
Q1	4:12	WSU	Augustin Olobia 33 yard pass from Drew Bledsoe ( Jason Hanson kick)	WSU 7–6
Q2	14:08	UW	Darius Turner 4 yard pass from Billy Joe Hobert (2 pt conversion failed)	UW 12-7
Q2	12:29	UW	Walter Bailey 37 yard interception return (Jay Barry 3 yard pass from Billy Joe Hobert)	UW 20–7
Q2	8:30	UW	Mario Bailey 20 yard pass from Mark Brunell (2 pt conversion failed)	UW 26–7
Q2	1:09	UW	Safety Jaime Fields 5 yard sack	UW 28–7
Q3	7:53	UW	Beno Bryant 21 yard run (Travis Hanson kick)	UW 35–7
Q3	1:06	WSU	Shaumbe Wright-Fair 3 yard pass from Drew Bledsoe (Jason Hanson kick)	UW 35–14
Q4	12:39	UW	Mario Bailey 7 pass from Billy Joe Hobert (Travis Hanson kick)	UW 42–14
Q4	11:04	WSU	Phillip Bobo 15 yard pass from Drew Bledsoe (Jason Hanson kick)	UW 42-21
Q4	10:37	UW	Jay Barry 8 yard run (Travis Hanson kick)	UW 49-21
Q4	3:50	UW	Mark Brunell 5 yard run	UW 56-21

=== vs No. 4 Michigan (Rose Bowl) ===
1992 Rose Bowl Game
No. 2 Washington Huskies (11–0) vs. No. 4 Michigan Wolverines (10–1) – Game summary

Quarter	1	2	3	4	Total
No. 2 Huskies	0	13	8	14	35
No. 4 Wolverines	0	7	0	7	14

at Rose Bowl • Pasadena, CA

- Date: January 1, 1992
- Game time: 1:45 p.m. PST
- Game weather: High Clouds • Temperature: 74 °F (23 °C) • Wind:
- Game attendance: 103,566
- Referee: Jimmy Harper (SEC)
- TV announcers (ABC): Keith Jackson (play-by-play), Bob Griese (analyst) and Jack Arute (sideline reporter)

Statistics	UW	UM
First downs	19	10
Total yards	404	205
Rushes/yards	43–123	33–72
Passing yards	281	133
Passing: Comp–Att–Int	25–42–2	14–28–1
Punting	6–41.8	10–37.8
Fumbles–Lost	0–0	3–0
Penalties–Yards	6–50	8–62
Time of possession	33:10	26:50

Team	Category	Player	Statistics
Washington	Passing		
Washington	Rushing		
Washington	Receiving		
Michigan	Passing		
Michigan	Rushing		
Michigan	Receiving		

Scoring summary

Quarter	Time	Drive			Team	Scoring information	Score	
Quarter	Time	Plays	Yards	TOP	Team	Scoring information	Washington	Michigan
2	14:57	8	54		Washington	Hobert 2-yard touchdown run, Hanson kick good	7	0
2	13:09	4	44		Michigan	Smith 9-yard touchdown reception from Grbac, Carlson kick good	7	7
2	6:52	13	60		Washington	24-yard field goal by Hanson	10	7
2	3:29	8	40		Washington	23-yard field goal by Hanson	13	7
3	5:27	12	80		Washington	Bruener 5-yard touchdown reception from Hobert, 2-point pass good	21	7
4	14:21	11	48		Washington	Pierce 2-yard touchdown reception from Hobert, Hanson kick no good	27	7
4	13:12	1	38		Washington	M. Bailey 38-yard touchdown reception from Brunell, Hanson kick good	34	7
4	10:34	5	71		Michigan	Wheatley 53-yard touchdown run, Carlson kick good	34	14
"TOP" = time of possession. For other American football terms, see Glossary of American football.							34	14

== Roster ==
1991 Washington Huskies football team roster
Players
Coaches
Offense

Pos.	#	Name	Class
WR	5	Mario Bailey (C)	Jr
RB	42	Jay Barry	Jr
TE	85	Mark Bruener	Fr
QB	11	Mark Brunell	Jr
RB	29	Beno Bryant	Jr
C	79	Ed Cunningham (C)	Sr
OT	66	Tom Gallagher	So
QB	12	Billy Joe Hobert	So
FB	22	Matt Jones	Jr
G	56	Pete Kaligis	Jr
RB	8	Napoleon Kaufman	Fr
OT	75	Lincoln Kennedy	Jr
OT	70	Siupeli Malamala	Sr
WR	4	Orlando McKay	Sr
G	52	Jim Nevelle	So
OT	71	Pete Pierson	So
TE	84	Aaron Pierce	Sr
G	72	Kris Rongen	So

Defense

Pos.	#	Name	Class
CB	23	Walter Bailey	So
LB	46	Brett Collins (C)	Sr
DE	90	Steve Emtman	Jr
DT	75	D'Marco Farr	So
OLB	3	Jaime Fields	Jr
ILB	39	Chico Fraley	Sr
CB	5	Dana Hall	Sr
ILB	54	Dave Hoffmann	Jr
OLB	48	Donald Jones (C)	Sr
DE	13	Andy Mason	So
FS	21	Bill Trull	Jr
NG	57	Tyrone Rodgers	Sr
FS	20	Tommie Smith	Jr
SS	8	Paxton Tailele	Sr

Special teams

Pos.	#	Name	Class
K	4	Travis Hanson	So
P	98	John Werdel	So

Head coach

- Don James (17th year)

Coordinators/assistant coaches

- Keith Gilbertson – OC
- Jim Lambright – DC

Legend

- (C) Team captain
- (S) Suspended
- (I) Ineligible
- Injured
- Redshirt

== Awards and honors ==
=== National ===
- All-Americans: **Mario Bailey**, **Steve Emtman**, Dave Hoffmann, Lincoln Kennedy (consensus in bold)
- Steve Emtman: Lombardi Award
- Steve Emtman: Outland Trophy
- Don James: FWAA Coach of the Year

=== Conference ===
- All-Pacific-10: Mario Bailey, Lincoln Kennedy, Ed Cunningham, Steve Emtman, Dave Hoffmann, Chico Fraley, Donald Jones, Dana Hall
- Pacific-10 Offensive Player of the Year: Mario Bailey
- Pacific-10 Defensive Player of the Year: Steve Emtman
- Pacific-10 Coach of the Year: Don James

== NFL draft selections ==
Eleven University of Washington Huskies were selected in the 1992 NFL draft, which lasted twelve rounds with 336 selections.

= Husky Hall of Fame

**Player**	**Position**	**Round**	**Pick**	**NFL club**
Steve Emtman	DT	1	1	Indianapolis Colts
Dana Hall	DB	1	18	San Francisco 49ers
Ed Cunningham	C	3	61	Arizona Cardinals
Siupeli Malamala	T	3	68	New York Jets
Aaron Pierce	TE	3	69	New York Giants
Orlando McKay	WR	5	130	Green Bay Packers
Mario Bailey	WR	6	162	Houston Oilers
Donald Jones	LB	9	245	New Orleans Saints
Kris Rongen	G	11	290	Seattle Seahawks
Brett Collins	LB	12	314	Green Bay Packers
Chico Fraley	LB	12	319	Seattle Seahawks

Lincoln Kennedy was a 1st round pick

- Both 1991 UW quarterbacks were selected in the following year's 1993 NFL draft: '91 soph. starter Billy Joe Hobert by the Los Angeles Raiders (3rd rd., 58th) and junior Mark Brunell ('90 soph. starter, injured in spring '91 practice, '92 senior starter) by the Green Bay Packers (5th rd., 118th); where he was a reserve for two seasons behind Brett Favre, then led the expansion Jacksonville Jaguars in 1995.
