= Mario Bailey =

American football player (born 1970)

No. 5, 81
- Position: Wide receiver

Personal information
- Born: November 30, 1970 (age 55); Seattle, Washington, U.S.
- Listed height: 5 ft 9 in (1.75 m)
- Listed weight: 162 lb (73 kg)

Career information
- High school: Franklin (Seattle)
- College: Washington
- NFL draft: 1992: 6th round, 162nd overall pick

Career history
- Houston Oilers (1992)*; New York Jets (1993)*; Houston Oilers (1994)*; Atlanta Falcons (1995)*; Frankfurt Galaxy (1995–1996); BC Lions (1996); Frankfurt Galaxy (1997–1998); Winnipeg Blue Bombers (1998); Seattle Seahawks (1999)*; Frankfurt Galaxy (1999–2000); Orlando Rage (2001); Detroit Fury (2003)
- * Offseason or practice squad member only

Awards and highlights
- 2× World Bowl champion (III, VIII); 3× All-NFL Europe (1998, 1999, 2000); National champion (1991); Consensus All-American (1991); Pac-10 Co-Offensive Player of the Year (1991); First-team All-Pac-10 (1991)
- Stats at ArenaFan.com

Mario Bailey (born November 30, 1970) is an American former professional football player. He is the all-time receptions leader in NFL Europe. He played for the Frankfurt Galaxy from 1995 through 2000 and was a favorite player of the local German fans.

Bailey played college football for the Washington Huskies, earning consensus All-American honors in 1991. He was selected by the Houston Oilers in the sixth round of the 1992 NFL draft. He was also drafted by the Orlando Rage of the XFL with the 52nd pick in the 2001 XFL draft. In 2003, Bailey played in the Arena Football League with the Detroit Fury.

Bailey is a former high school football coach at his alma mater, Franklin High School in Seattle, Washington, and is a member of the Seattle Seahawks high school council.

== College career ==
After high school at Franklin, Bailey had a record-breaking college football career nearby at the University of Washington from 1988 through 1991 under head coach Don James. He played a key role as a senior in 1991 on the Huskies' national championship team, and holds the Husky records for touchdowns in a season (18), career (30), and shares the record with several others for touchdowns in a game.

- 1989 - 25 catches for 357 yards and 3 TD.
- 1990 - 40 catches for 667 yards and 6 TD.
- 1991 - 62 catches for 1,037 yards and 17 TD.

Bailey and NFL tight end Aaron Pierce were teammates at Franklin and Washington.

Pre-draft measurables
Height	Weight	Arm length	Hand span	40-yard dash	10-yard split	20-yard split	20-yard shuttle	Vertical jump
5 ft 9 in (1.75 m)	162 lb (73 kg)	29 3/4 in (0.76 m)	8 3/4 in (0.22 m)	4.62 s	1.66 s	2.71 s	4.18 s	35.0 in (0.89 m)

In 2014, Bailey was inducted into the Husky Hall of Fame.

== See also ==
- Washington Huskies football statistical leaders
