= 1991 Rose Bowl =

American college football game

- 77th Rose Bowl Game
| Iowa Hawkeyes | Washington Huskies |
| (8–3) | (9–2) |
| 34 | 46 |
| Head coach: Hayden Fry | Head coach: Don James |
| AP / Coaches; 17 / 15 | AP / Coaches; 8 / 7 |
| | 1 | 2 | 3 | 4 | Total |
|---|---|---|---|---|---|
| Iowa | 0 | 7 | 7 | 20 | 34 |
| Washington | 10 | 23 | 6 | 7 | 46 |
- Date: January 1, 1991
- Season: 1990
- Stadium: Rose Bowl
- Location: Pasadena, California
- Player of the Game: Mark Brunell (QB Washington)
- Favorite: Washington by 9½ points
- Referee: Pat Flood (Pac-10 (split crew: Pac-10, Big Ten)
- Attendance: 101,273

United States TV coverage
- Network: ABC
- Announcers: Keith Jackson and Bob Griese

The 1991 Rose Bowl was the 77th Rose Bowl Game, played on January 1, 1991. The #8 Washington Huskies built a 33–7 halftime lead and defeated the #17 Iowa Hawkeyes 46–34.

Washington sophomore quarterback Mark Brunell was named the Player of the Game. The 80 points scored in the game broke the previous Rose Bowl record of 79, which had stood for nearly thirty years (set in the 1963 Rose Bowl). This record, in turn, stood for more than twenty years until it was broken in the 2012 Rose Bowl. This was Iowa's 5th Rose Bowl appearance. In 2006, an ESPN Classic poll of the top 20 Rose Bowls named this game as the 20th best Rose Bowl.

== Pre-game activities ==
The Pasadena Tournament of Roses announces the 1991 Royal Court on Tuesday, October 17, 1990, all leading up to the Rose Queen selection ceremony the following week. On Tuesday, October 23, all seven young women are on the historic steps of Tournament House in Pasadena when the 1990–91 Tournament of Roses President Roy L. Coats being accompanied by outgoing Queen Yasmine Delawari with a bouquet of roses will be placed on the hands of a successor. The top honor goes to 17-year-old Cara Payton Rullman, a senior at San Marino High School and a resident of San Marino, California, becomes the 73rd Rose Queen to reign over the 102nd Rose Parade and the 77th Rose Bowl Game on New Year's Day.

The game was presiding over by the 1991 Tournament of Roses Royal Court and Rose Parade Grand Marshal Bob Newhart. Members of the court are: Princesses Dawn Gray, Pasadena, Pasadena City College; Tisha Mei-Lin Kong, San Marino, San Marino High School; Harini Reddy, Arcadia, Westridge School; Jessica Roegler, Altadena, John Muir High School; Wendy Schnee, Pasadena, Westridge School; and Andrea Uyeda, Pasadena, Polytechnic School.

== Game summary ==
Washington scored 23 points in the second quarter and built a sizable 33–7 lead at halftime. The teams each scored a touchdown in the third quarter, taking the score to 39–14. With a 25-point lead, Washington substituted reserves early in the fourth quarter, and the Hawkeyes quickly scored two touchdowns. Washington responded with a touchdown to put the score at 46–26; Iowa followed with the final score of the game, a touchdown and two-point conversion to bring the final score to 46–34, the closest Iowa had been since the middle of the second quarter. Washington (10–2) was elevated to #5 in both polls and Iowa (8–4) dropped one notch to finish eighteenth in both polls.

=== Scoring ===
==== First quarter ====
- Wash. - Hanson, 23-yard field goal - Wash. 3–0
- Wash. - Hall, 27-yard return of blocked punt (Hanson kick) - Wash. 10–0

==== Second quarter ====
- Iowa - Bell, 15-yard run (Skillett kick) - Wash. 10–7
- Wash. - Hanson, 34-yard field goal - Wash. 13–7
- Wash. - Mincy, 37-yard interception return (pass failed) - Wash. 19–7
- Wash. - Brunell, 5-yard run (Hanson kick) - Wash. 26–7
- Wash. - Bailey, 22-yard pass from Brunell (Hanson kick) - Wash. 33–7

==== Third quarter ====
- Iowa - Rodgers, 7-yard run (Skillett kick) - Wash. 33–14
- Wash. - Brunell, 20-yard run (run failed) - Wash. 39–14

==== Fourth quarter ====
- Iowa - Rodgers, 9-yard run (run failed) - Wash. 39–20
- Iowa - Bell, 20-yard run (pass failed) - Wash. 39–26
- Wash. - Bailey, 31-yard pass from Brunell (Hanson kick) - Wash. 46–26
- Iowa - Saunders, 12-yard pass from Rodgers (Velicer, pass from Rodgers) - Wash. 46–34
