= Kurt Barber =

American football player and coach (born 1969)

No. 98
- Positions: Linebacker, defensive end

Personal information
- Born: January 5, 1969 (age 57); Paducah, Kentucky, U.S.
- Listed height: 6 ft 4 in (1.93 m)
- Listed weight: 245 lb (111 kg)

Career information
- High school: Paducah Tilghman
- College: USC
- NFL draft: 1992: 2nd round, 42nd overall pick

Career history

Playing
- New York Jets (1992–1995); Denver Broncos (1997)*; Chicago Bears (1997)
- * Offseason or practice squad member only

Coaching
- Riverside (1998) Defensive line; Tennessee–Martin (1999–2000) Defensive line; Kent State (2001–2002) Defensive line; Utah (2003) Defensive line; Utah (2004) Linebackers; UNLV (2005) Linebackers, special teams coordinator; UNLV (2006) Defensive line, special teams coordinator; UNLV (2007) Co-defensive coordinator, defensive line; Kentucky State (2008) Defensive coordinator; Western Kentucky (2009) Outside linebackers; Campbellsville (2010–2011) Assistant; Paducah Tilghman HS (KY) (2016) Head coach

Awards and highlights
- 2× second-team All-Pac-10 (1990, 1991)

Career NFL statistics
- Tackles: 29
- Sacks: 3.5
- Stats at Pro Football Reference

Kurt Barber (born January 5, 1969) is an American former football player and coach. He played professionally as was a linebacker for the New York Jets of the National Football League (NFL). Barber played college football for the USC Trojans. He became a coach after his playing career.

== Early life ==
Barber prepped at Paducah Tilghman High School where he won the Kentucky "Mr. Football" Award in 1987. He was a high school All-American as both wide receiver and linebacker.

== College career ==
Barber graduated with a BA in communications from the University of Southern California, where he was All-Pac-10 as a linebacker. He was a starter as a junior and senior and was a four-year letter winner.

== Professional career ==
Barber was selected with the 42nd pick in the second round of the 1992 NFL draft by the New York Jets, where he played until 1995. He also played for the Denver Broncos and Chicago Bears.

== Coaching career ==
Barber began his coaching career in 1998 at Riverside Community College. He was named linebackers coach at the University of Nevada, Las Vegas (UNLV) in 2004, after having coached at the University of Tennessee at Martin, Kent State University, and the University of Utah. Barber was the offensive line coach at Campbellsville University in Campbellsville, Kentucky from 2010 to 2011. He served as head football coach at his alma mater, Paducah Tilghman High School, for one season, in 2016.

Preceded by Frank Jacobs	Kentucky Mr. Football; 1987	Succeeded by Jeff Brohm
