= Siupeli Malamala =

Tongan gridiron football player (born 1969)

No. 70, 75, 73
- Positions: Offensive tackle, guard

Personal information
- Born: January 15, 1969 (age 57); Tofoa, Tonga
- Listed height: 6 ft 5 in (1.96 m)
- Listed weight: 310 lb (141 kg)

Career information
- High school: Kalaheo (Kailua, Hawaii, U.S.)
- College: Washington
- NFL draft: 1992: 3rd round, 68th overall pick

Career history
- New York Jets (1992–1998); Oakland Raiders (1999); New York Jets (1999)

Awards and highlights
- National champion (1991); Second-team All-Pac-10 (1991)

Career NFL statistics
- Games played: 62
- Games started: 41
- Fumble recoveries: 1
- Stats at Pro Football Reference

Siupeli Malamala (born January 15, 1969) is a Tongan-born former professional football offensive lineman. He played offensive tackle and offensive guard in the National Football League (NFL) for the New York Jets from 1992 to 1999. He was drafted by the Jets in the third round of the 1992 NFL draft with the 68th overall pick. He played in 62 games throughout his professional career.

== High school and college career ==
Malamala lived in Tonga until the age of 14, when he moved to Hawaii. He attended Kalaheo High School in Kailua, O'ahu before matriculating at the University of Washington. Holds high school record for shot put in 1987 at 50' 7.75" and discus at 162' 9'.

== Post-NFL career ==
He now coaches offensive and defensive line at The Benjamin School in Palm Beach Gardens, Florida.
