= Jeff Thomason =

American football player (born 1969)

No. 49, 83, 85
- Position: Tight end

Personal information
- Born: December 30, 1969 (age 56); San Diego, California, U.S.
- Listed height: 6 ft 5 in (1.96 m)
- Listed weight: 255 lb (116 kg)

Career information
- High school: Corona del Mar (Newport Beach, California)
- College: Oregon
- NFL draft: 1992: undrafted

Career history
- Cincinnati Bengals (1992–1993); Green Bay Packers (1994–1999); Philadelphia Eagles (2000–2002, 2004)

Awards and highlights
- Super Bowl champion (XXXI); 2× Second-team All-Pac-10 (1990, 1991)

Career NFL statistics
- Receptions: 67
- Receiving yards: 650
- Receiving touchdowns: 10
- Stats at Pro Football Reference

Jeffrey David Thomason (born December 30, 1969) is an American former professional football player who was a tight end in the National Football League (NFL). He played college football for the Oregon Ducks.

== First NFL stint ==
After playing college football at the University of Oregon, he was signed as an undrafted free agent by the Cincinnati Bengals in 1992. He played for the Bengals, Green Bay Packers, and Philadelphia Eagles, primarily as a reserve player, for ten years. He retired in 2002.

== Second NFL stint ==
Thomason returned to the spotlight before Super Bowl XXXIX when he was re-signed by the Eagles two years after his retirement in order to temporarily replace injured tight end Chad Lewis. After seeing a few plays of action during the Eagles' loss in that game, he retired once again that summer, returning to the construction business he had been working at before he was re-signed.
