= Matt Elliott (American football) =

American football player (born 1968)

Matthew Elliot
No. 52
- Positions: Guard, center

Personal information
- Born: October 1, 1968 (age 58); Carmel, Indiana, U.S.
- Listed height: 6 ft 3 in (1.91 m)
- Listed weight: 288 lb (131 kg)

Career information
- High school: Carmel
- College: Michigan
- NFL draft: 1992: 12th round, 336th overall pick

Career history
- Washington Redskins (1992–1993); Carolina Panthers (1995–1997); Atlanta Falcons (1998)*
- * Offseason or practice squad member only

Awards and highlights
- PFWA All-Rookie Team (1992); First-team All-Big Ten (1991)

Career NFL statistics
- Games played: 63
- Games started: 34
- Fumble recoveries: 1
- Stats at Pro Football Reference

Eric Matthew Elliott (born October 1, 1968) is an American former professional football player. He played college football as a center and guard for the University of Michigan from 1988 to 1991. He started 35 games at Michigan and was selected as an All-American in 1991. He played professional football as a center and guard in the National Football League (NFL) for the Washington Redskins in 1992 and for the Carolina Panthers from 1995 to 1997.

== Early life ==
Elliott was born in Carmel, Indiana, in 1968. He attended Carmel High School.

== University of Michigan ==
Elliott enrolled at the University of Michigan in 1987 and played college football for the Michigan Wolverines football teams from 1988 to 1991.

As a sophomore, Elliott started all 11 games, nine at right guard and two at left guard, for the 1989 Michigan Wolverines football team that compiled a 10–2 record and was ranked #7 in the final AP Poll in Bo Schembechler's last season as head coach at Michigan.

As a junior, Elliott started all 12 games, four at left guard and eight at center, for the 1990 Michigan team that compiled a 9–3 record and was ranked #7 in the final AP Poll. Elliott started the season at left guard, but was moved to center after Steve Everitt broke his foot in Michigan's 45–17 victory over Maryland. Elliott was named the co-MVP of the 1991 Gator Bowl at the conclusion of his junior season.

As a senior, Elliott started all 12 games, eight at left guard and four at center, for the 1991 Michigan team that compiled a 10–2 record, won the Big Ten championship, and was ranked #6 in the final AP Poll. Elliott again started the season at left guard, but moved to center for four games after Steve Everitt suffered a broken jaw in the Notre Dame game on September 14, 1991. At the end of the season, he was selected as a first-team All-American and a first-team All-Big Ten player.

== Professional football ==
Elliott was selected by the Washington Redskins in the 12th round (336th overall pick) of the 1992 NFL draft. He was the final selection in the final round of the draft, giving him the designation of Mr. Irrelevant. Despite the moniker, Elliott appeared in 16 games, two as a starter, for the Redskins during the 1992 season. He spent the 1993 season on injured reserve, and he was cut during training camp in 1994.

During the 1994 NFL season, Elliott was unable to sign with another NFL team. Instead, he worked as a sideline reporter covering Washington Redskins games and as a color commentator for high school football games in Loudoun County, Virginia.

In 1995, Elliott attempted a comeback and signed with the Carolina Panthers. When he was announced as a starter for the Panthers during the 1995 preseason, Elliott described it as being "a little like a fairy tale" and "a dream come true." He was the Panthers' starting right guard in 14 games during the 1995 season. The following year, he appeared in 16 regular season games, 12 as a starter, as a center and left guard for the 1996 Carolina Panthers team that compiled a 12–4 record, won the NFC West, and lost to the Green Bay Packers in the NFC Championship Game. He was dubbed "Lego Man" in 1996 because he started at center and guard and also played some at tackle. In his final NFL season, Elliott appeared in 16 games, six as a starter, as a left guard for the 1997 Panthers. While playing for Carolina, Elliott founded Fatguy Charities to raise money for children.

In four NFL seasons, Elliott appeared in 63 games, 34 as a starter, for the Redskins and Panthers. He played longer in the NFL than any prior player to bear the "Mr. Irrelevant" moniker.

== Later life ==
After retiring as a player, Elliott covered NFL Europe on Fox Sports and college football games on ESPN. As of 2006, Elliott was living in Warsaw, Indiana, with his wife, Kristin. His six-year-old son, Max, was battling leukemia at that time.
