= Russell White =

American football player (born 1970)

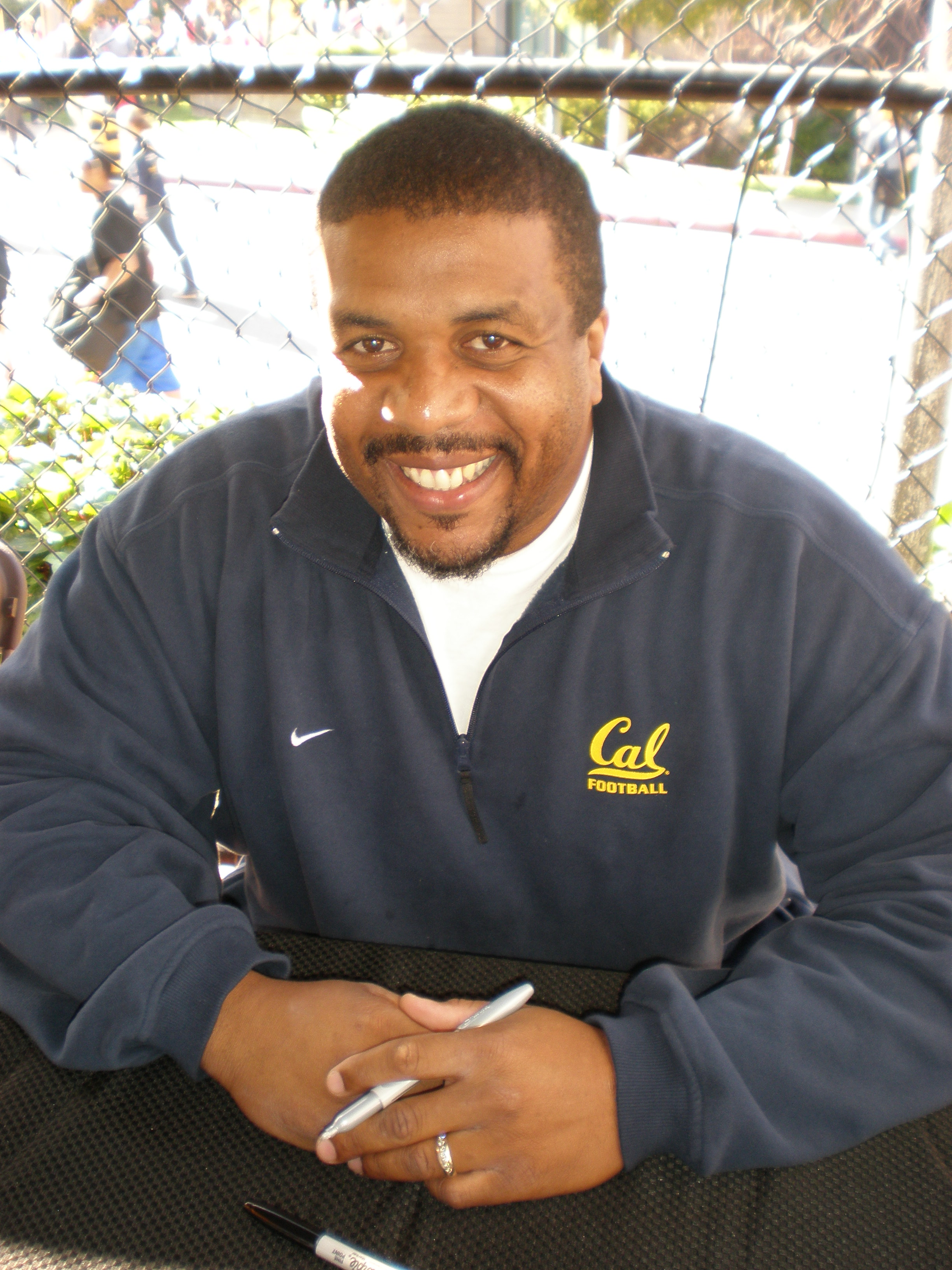
- White in 2008

No. 44, 1
- Position: Running back

Personal information
- Born: December 15, 1970 (age 55); Pacoima, California, U.S.
- Listed height: 5 ft 11 in (1.80 m)
- Listed weight: 216 lb (98 kg)

Career information
- High school: Crespi Carmelite (Encino, California)
- College: California
- NFL draft: 1993: 3rd round, 73rd overall pick

Career history
- Los Angeles Rams (1993); Green Bay Packers (1995); San Francisco 49ers (1996)*; London Monarchs (1996)
- * Offseason or practice squad member only

Awards and highlights
- Consensus All-American (1991); 2× First-team All-Pac-10 (1990, 1991); Second-team All-Pac-10 (1992); University of California Hall of Fame

Career NFL statistics
- Rushing yards: 10
- Average: 5
- Return yards: 122
- Stats at Pro Football Reference

Russell Lamar White (born December 15, 1970) is an American former professional football player who was a running back in the National Football League (NFL) for a single season in 1993. White played college football for the California Golden Bears, and was recognized as a consensus All-American. Thereafter, he played professionally for the NFL's Los Angeles Rams.

== Early life ==
White was born in Pacoima, California. He graduated from Crespi Carmelite High School in Encino, California, where he played for the Crespi Carmelite Celts high school football team. As a sophomore tailback in 1986, he led the team to a state championship, rushing for 256 yards in the championship game. Slowed by injuries as a senior in 1988, he still gained 1,379 yards on the ground, caught 43 passes for 529 yards, scored 25 touchdowns, and was named to California Football's all-state team. He completed his three high school seasons with 5,998 rushing yards, 94 touchdowns and 568 points—all California state high school records. In 1986 and again in 1987, he was recognized as a high school All-American by USA Today and Scholastic Coach and was also a two-time Cal Hi Sports California High School Football Player of the Year. In 2023 he was inducted into the Inaugural California High School Football Hall of Fame.

== College career ==
White received an athletic scholarship to attend the University of California, Berkeley, where he played for the Golden Bears teams from 1990 through 1992. He enrolled in 1989, but was ineligible to play as a freshman under the NCAA's Proposition 48 because he did not score high enough on the SAT college entrance exam. Subsequently, diagnosed with dyslexia, he received tutoring and qualified academically to play in 1990. In the Bears' 1990 season opener against the Miami Hurricanes on September 15, the first time he ever touched the ball in a college game, he returned a kickoff 99 yards for a touchdown. As a junior in 1991, he rushed for 1,177 yards and 14 touchdowns, and was recognized as a consensus first-team All-American, having received first-team honors from the Football Writers Association of America and the Walter Camp Foundation.

During his three-season college career, he amassed 3,367 yards and a 5.1 yards-per-carry average to become the Golden Bears' all-time rushing leader. He also scored 35 touchdowns on the ground—the most career rushing touchdowns in team history—and compiled fifteen games in which he rushed for 100 yards or more. White graduated from the university in 1993 with a Bachelor of Arts degree in social welfare, and was inducted into the University of California Hall of Fame in 2003.

== Professional career ==
The Los Angeles Rams selected White in the third round of the 1993 NFL draft. He played for the Rams for a single season in 1993. He appeared in five games for the Rams, primarily as a kick returner. He later signed with the Green Bay Packers in 1995, but played in no regular season games. He finished his career with the San Francisco Forty-niners in 1996.

== Post-playing career ==
White was the athletic director and head football coach at Desert Chapel High School in Palm Springs, California where he led the Eagles to back to back CIF Division titles in 2002 and 2003. White is now a teacher and was hired as the new head football coach at Castlemont High School in Oakland, California on April 30, 2010. White is currently the commissioner of the Oakland Section of CIF. He was announced to be the new head football coach/ Assistant Athletic Director at Flintridge Preparatory School on March 18, 2016.

White is the nephew of former University of Southern California running back and Heisman Trophy winner Charles White, and the cousin of former UCLA and San Francisco 49er defensive back and kick returner Kermit Alexander.
