= 1990 All-Pacific-10 Conference football team =

The 1990 All-Pacific-10 Conference football team consists of American football players chosen by various organizations for All-Pacific-10 Conference teams for the 1990 college football season.

== Offensive selections ==
=== Quarterbacks ===
- Bill Musgrave, Oregon (Coaches-1)
- Mark Brunell, Washington (Coaches-2)

=== Running backs ===
- Greg Lewis, Washington (Coaches-1)
- Glyn Milburn, Stanford (Coaches-1)
- Russell White, California (Coaches-1)
- Anthony Wallace, California (Coaches-2)
- Leonard Russell, Arizona St. (Coaches-2)

=== Wide receivers ===
- Ed McCaffrey, Stanford (Coaches-1)
- Gary Wellman, USC (Coaches-1)
- Brian Treggs, California (Coaches-2)
- Scott Miller, UCLA (Coaches-2)

=== Tight ends ===
- Clarence Williams, Washington St. (Coaches-1)
- Jeff Thomason, Oregon (Coaches-2)

=== Tackles ===
- Bob Whitfield, Stanford (Coaches-1)
- Pat Harlow, USC (Coaches-1)
- Lincoln Kennedy, Washington (Coaches-2)
- Troy Auzenne, California (Coaches-2)
- Mark Hayes, Arizona St. (Coaches-2)

=== Guards ===
- Jeff Pahukoa, Washington (Coaches-1)
- Dean Kirkland, Washington (Coaches-1)
- James Richards, California (Coaches-2)
- Ernie Rogers, California (Coaches-2)
- Rick Warren, Arizona (Coaches-2)

=== Centers ===
- Mark Tucker, USC (Coaches-1)

== Defensive selections ==
=== Ends ===
- Steve Emtman, Washington (Coaches-1)
- Travis Richardson, Washington (Coaches-1)
- Matt LaBounty, Oregon (Coaches-2)
- Rhett Hall, California (Coaches-2)

=== Tackles ===
- Don Gibson, USC (Coaches-1)
- Esera Tuaolo, Oregon St. (Coaches-1)
- Reggie Johnson, Arizona (Coaches-2)
- Marcus Woods, Oregon (Coaches-2)

=== Linebackers ===
- Scott Ross, USC (Coaches-1)
- Roman Phifer, UCLA (Coaches-1)
- Peter Brantley, Oregon (Coaches-1)
- Donald Jones, Washington (Coaches-1)
- Brett Collins, Washington (Coaches-2)
- Chico Fraley, Washington (Coaches-2)
- Jono Tunney, Stanford (Coaches-2)
- Kurt Barber, USC (Coaches-2)

=== Cornerbacks ===
- Darryll Lewis, Arizona (Coaches-1)
- Charles Mincy, Washington (Coaches-1)
- Kevin Scott, Stanford (Coaches-1)
- Brent Huff, Oregon St. (Coaches-2)
- Phillippi Sparks, Arizona St. (Coaches-2)

=== Safeties ===
- Eric Turner, UCLA (Coaches-1)
- Nathan LaDuke, Arizona St. (Coaches-1)
- Eric Briscoe, Washington (Coaches-2)
- Eric Castle, Oregon (Coaches-2)

== Special teams ==
=== Placekickers ===
- Jason Hanson, Washington St. (Coaches-1)
- Gregg McCallum, Oregon (Coaches-2)

=== Punters ===
- Jason Hanson, Washington St. (Coaches-1)
- Tommy Thompson, Oregon (Coaches-2)

=== Return specialists ===
- Beno Bryant, Washington (Coaches-1)
- Glyn Milburn, Stanford (Coaches-2)

== Key ==
Coaches = Pacific-10 head football coaches

== See also ==
- 1990 College Football All-America Team
