= Ed Cunningham =

American football player and announcer (born 1969)

No. 59, 79
- Position: Center

Personal information
- Born: August 17, 1969 (age 57); Washington D.C., U.S.
- Listed height: 6 ft 3 in (1.91 m)
- Listed weight: 285 lb (129 kg)

Career information
- High school: Mount Vernon (VA)
- College: Washington
- NFL draft: 1992: 3rd round, 61st overall pick

Career history
- Phoenix/Arizona Cardinals (1992–1995); Chicago Bears (1996)*; Seattle Seahawks (1996)
- * Offseason or practice squad member only

Awards and highlights
- National champion (1991); First-team All-Pac-10 (1991)

Career NFL statistics
- Games played: 61
- Games started: 47
- Stats at Pro Football Reference

Ed Cunningham (born August 17, 1969) is an American sports announcer, film producer, and former professional American football player.

Following his career in the National Football League (NFL), Cunningham worked as an commentator for different media outlets, most recently ESPN. In 2017, he resigned citing his personal concerns with safety risks posed by the sport of football.

== Playing career ==
Selected in the third round (61st overall) of the 1992 NFL draft by the Phoenix Cardinals, Cunningham played center for five seasons for the Phoenix/Arizona Cardinals and the Seattle Seahawks of the National Football League. He played college football at the University of Washington in Seattle, helping them win a national championship in 1991.

== Sports commentator ==
After his football career, he became a football analyst for TNN (now known as Spike) calling games for the Arena Football League with Eli Gold as his broadcast partner. Cunningham also called Arizona Rattlers games for KUTP TV and KGME AM.

In 1997, Cunningham became a regional college football analyst for CBS Sports. Cunningham moved over to ABC Sports in August 2000.

In 2006, with the merger of ESPN and ABC Sports, Cunningham began appearing as analyst on ESPN College Football as well.

In the years that followed, Cunningham's commentary increasingly drew the ire of college football coaches, resulting in at least two occasions where coaches responded directly to Cunningham's broadcasting commentary. These included Nebraska's Bo Pelini, Iowa's Kirk Ferentz, who called comments by Cunningham "surprising and offensive," and Michigan's Jim Harbaugh, who condemned Cunningham's comments regarding a Michigan player's injury. Cunningham later apologized for the Michigan comments.

Cunningham resigned from ESPN prior to the 2017 college season, citing disenchantment with football due to growing evidence of the risk of chronic traumatic encephalopathy that the sport poses for its players.

== Film career ==
Cunningham began to move behind the scenes in filmmaking and television. In 1992 he directed a documentary about his rookie season in the NFL. In 2005 he produced his first documentary New York Doll and then continued to produce several other documentaries including The King of Kong: A Fistful of Quarters (2007) and Undefeated (2011), which won the Academy Award for Best Documentary Feature. He also produced TV series like Breaking In and 'Dukes of Haggle' while also writing and directing the documentary 'Jerry's Last Mission'.

In June 2025, Cunningham made his feature directorial debut with Arcades & Love Songs: The Ballad of Walter Day, a documentary about a key character from The King of Kong who moved on from video games to fulfill a dream of writing and recording rock love songs.
