= Phillippi Sparks =

American football player (born 1969)

No. 22, 20.
- Position: Cornerback

Personal information
- Born: April 15, 1969 (age 57); Oklahoma City, Oklahoma, U.S.
- Listed height: 5 ft 11 in (1.80 m)
- Listed weight: 195 lb (88 kg)

Career information
- High school: Maryvale (Phoenix, Arizona)
- College: Arizona State
- NFL draft: 1992: 2nd round, 41st overall pick

Career history
- New York Giants (1992–1999); Dallas Cowboys (2000)

Awards and highlights
- First-team All-Pac-10 (1991); Second-team All-Pac-10 (1990)

Career NFL statistics
- Tackles: 492
- Interceptions: 27
- Pass deflections: 19
- Stats at Pro Football Reference

Phillippi Dwain Sparks (born April 15, 1969) is an American former professional football player who was a cornerback in the National Football League (NFL). He played college football for the Arizona State Sun Devils.

Sparks graduated from Maryvale High School in Phoenix, Arizona, in 1987. He attended and played football for Glendale Community College in Glendale, Arizona, from 1987 through 1989. Sparks played a key role on Glendale Community College's 1988 National Junior College Athletic Association national championship football team.

He then attended Arizona State University, where he was a member of the Sigma Chi fraternity. He was selected by the New York Giants as the 13th pick in the second round of the 1992 NFL draft. He played left cornerback opposite Jason Sehorn for six years and formed a talented defensive backfield tandem. He played for the Giants until 1999. In 2000, he was signed by the Dallas Cowboys. Sparks announced his retirement on August 28, 2001, having played for nine seasons.

He now resides in San Diego. Sparks has a son and a daughter. His daughter, Jordin, is a Grammy nominated singer who won the sixth season of American Idol in 2007.
