= Beno Bryant =

American football player (born 1971)

No. 22, 23
- Positions: Tailback, return specialist

Personal information
- Born: January 1, 1971 (age 55); Los Angeles, California, U.S.
- Listed height: 5 ft 9 in (1.75 m)
- Listed weight: 185 lb (84 kg)

Career information
- High school: Susan Miller Dorsey (Los Angeles, California)
- College: Washington
- NFL draft: : N/Ath round1994: undrafted

Career history
- Los Angeles Rams (1994)*; Seattle Seahawks (1994); Ottawa Rough Riders (1995); Amsterdam Admirals (1996)
- * Offseason or practice squad member only

Awards and highlights
- National champion (1991); First-team All-Pac-10 (1990)

Career NFL statistics
- Rushing yards: 6
- Kick returns: 7
- Kick return yards: 136
- Kick return average: 19.4
- Punt returns: 1
- Punt return yards: 31
- Stats at Pro Football Reference

Beno Bryant (born January 1, 1971) is an American former professional football player who was a return specialist and running back for the Seattle Seahawks of the National Football League (NFL). He played college football for the Washington Huskies.

== High school ==
Bryant attended Susan Miller Dorsey High School, participating in both football and track. In 1989, Bryant set a city record of 46.63 in the 400 meters.

== College career ==
Bryant played at the University of Washington from 1989 to 1993, using a redshirt year in 1992. He holds many of Washington's career return records and was named to the 1990 All-Pacific-10 Conference football team as return specialist. The Seattle Times named Bryant as Washington's #3 special teams player of the Pac-10 era.

Bryant was also an All-American sprinter for the Washington Huskies track and field team, leading off their 5th-place 4 × 400 meters relay team at the 1990 NCAA Division I Outdoor Track and Field Championships.

== Professional career ==
In 1994, Bryant played in two games for the Seattle Seahawks. Bryant was selected in 1996 and played for the Amsterdam Admirals of the World League of American Football, and then was drafted in 1997 by the Frankfurt Galaxy.
