= Steve Emtman =

American football player and coach (born 1970)

No. 79, 90, 94
- Positions: Defensive end, defensive tackle

Personal information
- Born: April 16, 1970 (age 56); Spokane, Washington, U.S.
- Listed height: 6 ft 4 in (1.93 m)
- Listed weight: 290 lb (132 kg)

Career information
- High school: Cheney (Cheney, Washington)
- College: Washington (1988–1991)
- NFL draft: 1992: 1st round, 1st overall pick

Career history

Playing
- Indianapolis Colts (1992–1994); Miami Dolphins (1995–1996); San Francisco 49ers (1997)*; Washington Redskins (1997)
- * Offseason or practice squad member only

Coaching
- Spokane Shock (2007–2010) (DL/S&C)

Awards and highlights
- ArenaBowl champion (2010); PFWA All-Rookie Team (1992); National champion (1991); Outland Trophy (1991); Lombardi Award (1991); UPI Lineman of the Year (1991); Unanimous All-American (1991); Second-team All-American (1990); Bill Willis Award (1991); 2× Morris Trophy (1990, 1991); 2× Pac-10 Defensive Player of the Year (1990, 1991); 2× First-team All-Pac-10 (1990, 1991)

Career NFL statistics
- Tackles: 134
- Sacks: 8
- Interceptions: 1
- Stats at Pro Football Reference
- College Football Hall of Fame

Steven Charles Emtman (born April 16, 1970) is an American former professional football player who was a defensive end in the National Football League (NFL) for six seasons. He played college football for the Washington Huskies, winning the Outland Trophy, Lombardi Award, and Bill Willis Award as a member of the undefeated team that won the 1992 Rose Bowl. Emtman was selected first overall by the Indianapolis Colts in the 1992 NFL draft, but his professional career was cut short by injuries. He was inducted to the College Football Hall of Fame in 2006.

== Early life ==
Emtman was born in Spokane, Washington, grew up in nearby Cheney, and graduated from Cheney High School in 1988. Lightly recruited, he accepted a football scholarship to the University of Washington in Seattle to play for head coach Don James.

== College career ==
He redshirted in 1988, but soon became a star as a sophomore on a resurgent defense in 1990. Washington went 10–2 and won the Rose Bowl for the first time in 9 seasons. He was considered the best overall player on the 1991 Husky undefeated national championship team. A unanimous All-American, Emtman won the Outland Trophy, Lombardi Award, was the Bill Willis Award winner and the UPI Lineman of the Year. He was also named the Pac-10 Defensive Player of the Year during his impressive junior year of 1991. He finished fourth in the ballot for the Heisman Trophy.

Emtman finished 1991 with 62 tackles and 20.5 tackles for loss.

He was voted into the College Football Hall of Fame in 2006.

== Professional career ==
Emtman decided to forgo his senior year and declared himself eligible for the 1992 NFL draft. At 6'4" and 290 lb (130 kg), he was the first overall pick, selected by the Indianapolis Colts. His most memorable play was the game-sealing 90-yard interception return for a touchdown as time expired in a 31–20 upset win at the Miami Dolphins in his rookie year, which earned him honors as AFC defensive player of the week.

Emtman's NFL career was marred by injuries. Playing a majority of his games on Astroturf, he finished each of his three seasons with the Colts on the injured reserve list. Nine games into his rookie year, he blew out his left knee against the Miami Dolphins. The following season, he tore the patellar tendon in his right knee, an injury that no previous NFL player had ever returned from. In October 1994, he beat the odds and made his comeback at home against the team he had grown up following, the Seattle Seahawks. On his first play, he tackled Chris Warren for a 5-yard loss. However, in the second quarter, he ruptured a disc in his neck in a collision with a teammate. Emtman continued to play, even though after the game, he could not close his fists due to nerve damage from the injury. He managed to play three more weeks until continuing pain forced him to undergo season-ending surgery. He later played for the Miami Dolphins and Washington Redskins. His playing career ended following the 1997 season at the age of 27.

== NFL career statistics ==
Year	Team	GP	Cmb	Solo	Ast	Sck	FF	FR
1992	IND	9	0	0	0	3	0	0
1993	IND	5	20	18	2	1	0	0
1994	IND	4	4	3	1	1	0	0
1995	MIA	16	14	10	4	1	0	2
1996	MIA	13	39	31	8	2	2	1
1997	WAS	3	5	4	1	0	0	0
Career		50	82	66	16	8	2	3

== Personal life ==
Emtman had a cameo appearance as himself in the 1994 feature film Little Giants, along with Bruce Smith, Tim Brown, Emmitt Smith, and John Madden. He also appeared as an uncredited zombie in the TV series Z Nation. His son was the zombie baby from the first episode.

Emtman formerly volunteered as the defensive line coach for the af2's Spokane Shock.

Emtman now lives in Spokane Valley, Washington, where he is a real estate developer and owns his own real estate development company.
