= Orlando McKay =

American gridiron football player (born 1969)

Profile
- Position: Wide receiver

Personal information
- Born: October 2, 1969 (age 57)
- Listed height: 5 ft 10 in (1.78 m)
- Listed weight: 175 lb (79 kg)

Career information
- High school: Mesa (Mesa, Arizona)
- College: Washington
- NFL draft: 1992: 5th round, 130th overall pick

Career history
- 1992: Green Bay Packers
- 1994: Hamilton Tigercats (CFL)
- 1995: Memphis Mad Dogs (CFL)

Awards and highlights
- National champion (1991)

Orlando McKay (born October 2, 1969) is an American former gridiron football wide receiver. He was drafted by and played for one season with the Green Bay Packers of the National Football League (NFL). He was signed in 1993 by the Philadelphia Eagles before concluding his playing career with the Hamilton Tigercats and Memphis Mad Dogs.

McKay currently is the football and track coach at Memphis University School (MUS) in Memphis, Tennessee. At MUS, McKay coached the Owls to four state football championships and two state track championships.

== High school ==
McKay attended Mesa High School in Mesa, Arizona, where he won the 1988 state track titles in the 100-, 200- and 400-meters and three 400 titles.

== College ==
McKay started at the Wide Receiver position for the University of Washington for three years before being selected in the fifth round of the 1992 NFL Draft by Green Bay (130th overall).

He had the 41st fastest time in the world in the 400 meter dash in 1990.

In college, he came away with Rose Bowl and National Championship Football rings, as #4 on the Washington Huskies as well as three Pac-10 All-Academic seasons.

McKay was also an All-American sprinter for the Washington Huskies track and field team, running on their 5th-place 4 × 400 meters relay at the 1990 NCAA Division I Outdoor Track and Field Championships.
