= Brett Collins =

American football player (born 1968)

No. 55, 54, 39
- Position: Linebacker

Personal information
- Born: October 8, 1968 (age 58); Sheridan, Wyoming, U.S.
- Listed height: 6 ft 1 in (1.85 m)
- Listed weight: 226 lb (103 kg)

Career information
- High school: Glencoe (Hillsboro, Oregon)
- College: Washington
- NFL draft: 1992: 12th round, 314th overall pick

Career history
- Green Bay Packers (1992–1993); Los Angeles Rams (1993–1994); Toronto Argonauts (1995)

Awards and highlights
- National champion (1991); Second-team All-Pac-10 (1990)

Career NFL statistics
- Tackles: 7
- Stats at Pro Football Reference

Brett William Collins (born October 8, 1968) is an American former professional football player who was a linebacker in the National Football League (NFL) for the Green Bay Packers and Los Angeles Rams, and in the Canadian Football League (CFL) with the Toronto Argonauts.

Collins played college football for the Washington Huskies before being selected by the Packers in the 12th round of the 1992 NFL draft with the 314th overall pick. He played in the NFL for three seasons from 1992 to 1994.

He is the father of soccer player Sydney Collins.
