= Donald Jones (linebacker) =

American football player (born 1969)

No. 51
- Position: Linebacker

Personal information
- Born: March 26, 1969 (age 57); Lynchburg, Virginia, U.S.
- Listed height: 6 ft 0 in (1.83 m)
- Listed weight: 231 lb (105 kg)

Career information
- High school: William Campbell (VA)
- College: Washington
- NFL draft: 1992: 9th round, 245th overall pick

Career history
- New Orleans Saints (1992)*; New York Jets (1992–1993); Indianapolis Colts (1993)*; Minnesota Vikings (1994)
- * Offseason or practice squad member only

Awards and highlights
- National champion (1991); 2× First-team All-Pac-10 (1990, 1991)

Career NFL statistics
- Sacks: 1
- Stats at Pro Football Reference

Donald Ray "Don" Jones (born March 26, 1969) is an American former professional football player who was a linebacker for the New York Jets and Minnesota Vikings of the National Football League (NFL). He played college football for the Washington Huskies and was selected by the Saints in the ninth round of the 1992 NFL draft.

== See also ==
- Washington Huskies football statistical leaders
