= 1991 All-Pacific-10 Conference football team =

The 1991 All-Pacific-10 Conference football team consists of American football players chosen by various organizations for All-Pacific-10 Conference teams for the 1991 college football season.

== Offensive selections ==
=== Quarterbacks ===
- Mike Pawlawski, California (Coaches-1)
- Drew Bledsoe, Washington State (Coaches-2)

=== Running backs ===
- Tommy Vardell, Stanford (Coaches-1)
- Russell White, California (Coaches-1)
- Glyn Milburn, Stanford (Coaches-2)
- Kevin Williams, UCLA (Coaches-2)

=== Wide receivers ===
- Mario Bailey, Washington (Coaches-1)
- Sean LaChapelle, UCLA (Coaches-1)
- Eric Guliford, Arizona State (Coaches-2)
- Chris Walsh, Stanford (Coaches-2)

=== Tight ends ===
- Clarence Williams, Washington State (Coaches-1)
- Aaron Pierce, Washington (Coaches-2)
- Jeff Thomason, California (Coaches-2)

=== Tackles ===
- Tony Boselli, USC (Coaches-1)
- Lincoln Kennedy, Washington (Coaches-1)
- Bob Whitfield, Stanford (Coaches-1)
- Troy Auzenne, California (Coaches-1)
- John Fina, Arizona (Coaches-2)
- Todd Steussie, California (Coaches-2)

=== Guards ===
- Vaughn Parker, UCLA (Coaches-1)
- Craig Novitsky, UCLA (Coaches-2)
- Siupeli Malamala, Washington (Coaches-2)

=== Centers ===
- Ed Cunningham, Washington (Coaches-1)
- Steve Gordon, California (Coaches-2)

== Defensive selections ==
=== Ends ===
- Steve Emtman, Washington (Coaches-1)
- Shane Collins, Arizona State (Coaches-1)
- Mike Chalenski, UCLA (Coaches-2)

=== Tackles ===
- Marcus Woods, Oregon (Coaches-1)
- Mack Travis, California (Coaches-2)
- David Webb, USC (Coaches-2)

=== Linebackers ===
- Ron George, Stanford (Coaches-1)
- Dave Hoffmann, Washington (Coaches-1)
- Chico Fraley, Washington (Coaches-1)
- Donald Jones, Washington (Coaches-1)
- Arnold Ale, UCLA (Coaches-2)
- Brett Wallerstedt, Arizona State (Coaches-2)
- Anthony McClanahan, Washington State (Coaches-2)
- Kurt Barber, USC (Coaches-2)

=== Cornerbacks ===
- Dana Hall, Washington (Coaches-1)
- Phillippi Sparks, Arizona State (Coaches-1)
- Walter Bailey, Washington (Coaches-2)
- Carlton Gray, UCLA (Coaches-2)

=== Safeties ===
- Matt Darby, UCLA (Coaches-1)
- Eric Castle, Oregon (Coaches-1)
- David Wilson, California (Coaches-2)
- Shane Pahukoa, Washington (Coaches-2)

== Special teams ==
=== Placekickers ===
- Doug Brien, California (Coaches-1)
- Jason Hanson, Washington State (Coaches-2)

=== Punters ===
- Jason Hanson, Washington State (Coaches-1)
- Ron Dale, USC (Coaches-2)

=== All purpose/Return specialists ===
- Chuck Levy, Arizona (Coaches-1)
- Curtis Conway, USC (Coaches-1)
- Glyn Milburn, Stanford (Coaches-2)
- Terry Vaughn, Arizona (Coaches-2)

== Key ==
Coaches = Pacific-10 head football coaches

== See also ==
- 1991 College Football All-America Team
