= Dana Hall (American football) =

American football player (born 1969)

No. 28, 25
- Position: Safety

Personal information
- Born: July 8, 1969 (age 57); Bellflower, California, U.S.
- Listed height: 6 ft 3 in (1.91 m)
- Listed weight: 211 lb (96 kg)

Career information
- High school: Ganesha (Pomona, California)
- College: Washington
- NFL draft: 1992: 1st round, 18th overall pick

Career history
- San Francisco 49ers (1992–1994); Cleveland Browns (1995); Jacksonville Jaguars (1996–1997)

Awards and highlights
- Super Bowl champion (XXIX); PFWA All-Rookie Team (1992); National champion (1991); First-team All-Pac-10 (1991)

Career NFL statistics
- Tackles: 202
- Interceptions: 7
- Fumble recoveries: 3
- Stats at Pro Football Reference

Dana Eric Hall (born July 8, 1969) is an American former professional football player who was a safety in the National Football League (NFL). He was selected by the San Francisco 49ers in the first round (18th overall) of the 1992 NFL draft.

Hall attended Ganesha High School in Pomona, California. He played college football for the University of Washington. Hall was also an All-American hurdler for the Washington Huskies track and field team, finishing 4th in the 55 meters hurdles at the 1991 NCAA Division I Indoor Track and Field Championships.

Standing at 6'2" and 206-lb., Hall played in six NFL seasons from 1992 to 1994 with the 49ers, 1995 with the Cleveland Browns, and 1996 to 1997 with the Jacksonville Jaguars.

As of the fall of 2010, Hall was a defensive backs coach at San Bernardino Valley College; during his tenure there, the team won their first conference title in 13 years.
