= Aaron Pierce (American football) =

American football player (born 1969)

No. 84, 81
- Position: Tight end

Personal information
- Born: September 8, 1969 (age 57); Seattle, Washington, U.S.
- Listed height: 6 ft 5 in (1.96 m)
- Listed weight: 250 lb (113 kg)

Career information
- High school: Franklin (Seattle)
- College: Washington
- NFL draft: 1992: 3rd round, 69th overall pick

Career history
- New York Giants (1992–1997); Baltimore Ravens (1999)

Awards and highlights
- National champion (1991); Second-team All-Pac-10 (1991)

Career NFL statistics
- Receptions: 97
- Receiving yards: 1,029
- Touchdowns: 5
- Stats at Pro Football Reference

Aaron R. Pierce (born September 8, 1969) is an American former professional football player who was a tight end and H-back for seven seasons in the National Football League (NFL) for the New York Giants and the Baltimore Ravens.

Born and raised in Seattle, Washington, Pierce graduated from its Franklin High School and played college football nearby at the University of Washington under head coach Don James. In his senior season in 1991, the undefeated Huskies shared the national championship with the Miami Hurricanes. Pierce was selected 69th overall in the third round of the 1992 NFL draft by the New York Giants.

Pre-draft measurables
Height	Weight	Arm length	Hand span	40-yard dash	10-yard split	20-yard split	20-yard shuttle	Vertical jump
6 ft 5 1/8 in (1.96 m)	246 lb (112 kg)	33 1/8 in (0.84 m)	9 1/8 in (0.23 m)	4.76 s	1.67 s	2.77 s	4.44 s	35.5 in (0.90 m)
