= Billy Joe Hobert =

American football player (born 1971)

No. 9, 8, 12
- Position: Quarterback

Personal information
- Born: January 8, 1971 (age 55); Puyallup, Washington, U.S.
- Listed height: 6 ft 3 in (1.91 m)
- Listed weight: 230 lb (104 kg)

Career information
- High school: Puyallup
- College: Washington (1989–1992)
- NFL draft: 1993: 3rd round, 58th overall pick

Career history
- Los Angeles / Oakland Raiders (1993–1996); Buffalo Bills (1997); New Orleans Saints (1997–1999); Indianapolis Colts (2000)

Awards and highlights
- National champion (1991)

Career NFL statistics
- Passing attempts: 527
- Passing completions: 275
- Completion percentage: 52.2%
- TD–INT: 23–25
- Passing yards: 3,371
- Passer rating: 67
- Stats at Pro Football Reference

Billy Joe Hobert (born January 8, 1971) is an American former professional football player who was a quarterback for nine seasons in the National Football League (NFL), primarily as a reserve. He played for the Washington Huskies.

== College career ==
While at the University of Washington, Hobert led the Huskies to a national championship in 1991, during his redshirt sophomore season. He was elevated to the starting position after junior Mark Brunell suffered a serious knee injury during spring drills, causing him to miss most of the 1991 season. During the 1991 season, Hobert was 173/285 on completions for 2,271 yards with 22 touchdowns versus 10 interceptions, with 56 yards rushing and 5 touchdowns.

After the success of the 1991 season, Hobert became implicated in a major NCAA scandal. It was revealed he had received a series of loans totaling $50,000 made by the father-in-law of a friend, while Hobert himself had no assets and no specific payment schedule. The story broke in early November 1992, when the top-ranked Huskies were 8–0 and on a 22-game winning streak; they lost three of four games to finish 9–3.

This cost Hobert his college eligibility, and was an aggravating factor in the university receiving Pacific-10 Conference sanctions for lack of institutional control; it led to head coach Don James resigning in protest in August 1993 over a two-year bowl ban. Although several other Huskies players were implicated in improprieties, Hobert became the most well-known face of the sanctions, leading to him receiving death threats.

== Professional career ==
Pre-draft measurables
Height	Weight	Arm length	Hand span	40-yard dash	10-yard split	20-yard split	20-yard shuttle	Vertical jump
6 ft 2 5/8 in (1.90 m)	234 lb (106 kg)	29 in (0.74 m)	9 3/4 in (0.25 m)	4.89 s	1.72 s	2.78 s	4.29 s	30.5 in (0.77 m)

Hobert was the 58th pick in the 1993 NFL draft, selected in the third round by the Los Angeles Raiders, sixty picks ahead of fellow Husky quarterback Brunell. He was the third quarterback selected in the draft, behind the top two overall picks, Drew Bledsoe and Rick Mirer. Hobert was also selected in the sixteenth round (453rd overall) of the 1993 MLB draft by the Chicago White Sox, but chose to pursue a career in the NFL.

Hobert was a back-up quarterback for four seasons with the Raiders, then went on to play for the Buffalo Bills in 1997. He was initially expected to compete with Alex Van Pelt and Todd Collins for the starting quarterback position made vacant by Jim Kelly's retirement; however, after a notorious incident in Buffalo where he publicly admitted that he had not read his playbook and was unprepared to play, he was promptly released in mid-October. Hobert was acquired later that season by the New Orleans Saints, where he remained through 1999; he signed with the Indianapolis Colts in 2000. While on the Colts roster for two years, he did not play a snap during the regular season.

On August 25, 1995, in a preseason game against the New England Patriots, after Raiders placekicker Jeff Jaeger left due to injury, Hobert was thrust into placekicking duties and made a 45-yard field goal to give the Raiders a one-point lead with under 4 minutes left in the game.

== Personal life ==
Hobert grew up in Orting, Washington.

Hobert has five children. Hobert became a born again Christian during the Saints pre-season camp in 1998.
