= Don James (American football) =

American football player and coach (1932–2013)

- James in July 2013

Biographical details
- Born: December 31, 1932; Massillon, Ohio, U.S.
- Died: October 20, 2013 (aged 80); Kirkland, Washington, U.S.

Playing career
- 1951–1953: Miami (FL)
- Positions: Quarterback, defensive back

Coaching career (HC unless noted)
- 1956–1957: Kansas (GA)
- 1958: Southwest Miami HS (FL)
- 1959–1961: Florida State (DB)
- 1962–1965: Florida State (DC)
- 1966–1967: Michigan (DB)
- 1968–1970: Colorado (DC)
- 1971–1974: Kent State
- 1975–1992: Washington

Head coaching record
- Overall: 178–76–3 (college)
- Bowls: 10–5

Accomplishments and honors

Championships
- National (1991); 1 MAC (1972); 6 Pac-8/Pac-10 (1977, 1980–81, 1990–92)

Awards
- AFCA Coach of the Year (1977); Paul "Bear" Bryant Award (1991); Eddie Robinson Coach of the Year (1991); George Munger Award (1991); Sporting News College Football COY (1991); MAC Coach of the Year (1972); 3× Pac-10 Coach of the Year (1980, 1990, 1991)
- College Football Hall of Fame; Inducted in 1997 (profile)
- Military career
- Allegiance: United States
- Branch: U.S. Army
- Service years: 1954–1956
- Rank: Lieutenant
- Conflicts: Cold War

Donald Earl James (December 31, 1932 – October 20, 2013) was an American college football coach and player. He served as the head coach at Kent State University from 1971 to 1974 and at the University of Washington from 1975 to 1992, compiling a career college football record of 178–76–3 (.698).

His 1991 Washington team won a share of the national championship after completing a 12–0 season with a decisive win over Michigan in the Rose Bowl. James was inducted into the College Football Hall of Fame as a coach in 1997.

== Early life ==
James was born in 1932 at his family's home on the outskirts of Massillon, Ohio. He was the fourth of five sons. Four of the five played football, and the eldest, Tommy, starred at Ohio State on the 1942 national championship team, and played professional football for a decade (1947–1956).

James attended Massillon Washington High School, where he was the quarterback for the school's football team in 1948 and 1949, and graduated in 1950.

== College football and military service ==
James attended the University of Miami on a football scholarship, and was the quarterback for the Hurricanes in 1952 and 1953. He set Miami single-season records for completions (121), yards (1,363), and completion percentage (56.9%). He earned a bachelor's degree in education in 1954, and was commissioned as a lieutenant in the U.S. Army.

James was inducted into the University of Miami Sports Hall of Fame in 1992.

== Coaching career ==
=== Assistant coaching positions ===
James was a graduate assistant for the Jayhawks at the University of Kansas under his former high school coach, Chuck Mather, and received a master's degree in education. He coached high school football in Florida at Southwest Miami High School in 1959, then was a college assistant coach for twelve seasons at Florida State, Michigan, and Colorado.

=== Kent State ===
James became a head coach in 1971 at Kent State in his native Ohio, where he had a 25–19–1 (.567) record in four years. At Kent State, he coached future NFL player Jack Lambert, and future college head coaches Nick Saban of Alabama, and Gary Pinkel of Missouri. During his four seasons at Kent State, the Golden Flashes won their only Mid-American Conference (MAC) title in 1972, and played in their first bowl game, the Tangerine Bowl. The 1973 team posted the best record in program history at 9–2.

=== Washington ===
In December 1974, James was hired by University of Washington (UW) athletic director Joseph Kearney to succeed Jim Owens as head coach of the Huskies. His original contract was for four years, starting at $28,000 per year.

Like Owens, James served as Husky head coach for 18 seasons, from 1975 until August 1993. He led the Huskies to a national championship in 1991. While at Washington, James' teams won four Rose Bowls, the Orange Bowl in January 1985, and had a 10–4 record in all bowl games. Overall, James tallied a 153–57–2 (.726) record at Washington, including a then-record 98 wins in Pacific-10 Conference play. (Against the five current North division opponents of the Pac-12, his record was 68–14 (.829)). Washington won 22 consecutive games from November 1990 to November 1992. James won national college coach of the year honors in 1977, 1984, and 1991. He was inducted into the College Football Hall of Fame in 1997.

In early November 1992, it was revealed that several Huskies players had received improper benefits. Among them, starting quarterback Billy Joe Hobert had received a series of loans totaling $50,000 made by a friend's father-in-law. At the time, the defending national champion Huskies were undefeated (8–0), ranked first in the AP poll, and second in the coaches' poll. While it was later determined the loan was neither an NCAA violation nor an institutional violation, this was the first in a series of reports by The Seattle Times and Los Angeles Times that initiated Pacific-10 Conference and NCAA investigations. These led to charges that Washington exhibited "lack of institutional control" over its handling of recruiting funds for on-campus visits and a Los Angeles booster summer jobs program. The Huskies received sanctions from both the NCAA and Pacific-10 Conference.

Though notably James and the coaching staff were not specifically cited as having broken any rules, James resigned from his head coaching position on August 22, 1993, in protest of what were considered unfair sanctions against his team for minor, unsubstantiated, or fabricated infractions. Though university president William Gerberding and athletic director Barbara Hedges had presented James the final list of penalties that all Pac-10 parties had agreed best for the football program and athletics, Gerberding argued in favor of altering the penalties against the program from a two-year TV revenue ban and one-year bowl ban, to a one-year TV revenue ban and two-year bowl ban.

In a 2019 interview with The Athletic, it was cited by his wife that his resignation from head coaching probably saved his life.

== Personal life ==
James married his high school sweetheart, Carol Hoobler, a Massillon native who followed James to Miami where she became a cheerleader. They were married in August 1952 and had three children: Jeff, Jill, and Jeni.

On October 10, 2004, James raised the Seattle Seahawks 12 flag before a game at Quest Field vs. the St. Louis Rams.

== Death ==
James died of pancreatic cancer at his Kirkland residence in 2013 at age 80.

== Legacy ==
In October 2017, the University of Washington unveiled a bronze statue of James in the northwest plaza of Husky Stadium in Seattle.

== Head coaching record ==
Year	Team	Overall	Conference	Standing	Bowl/playoffs	Coaches^{#}	AP^{°}
Kent State Golden Flashes (Mid-American Conference) (1971–1974)
1971	Kent State	3–8	0–5	6th			
1972	Kent State	6–5–1	4–1	1st	L Tangerine		
1973	Kent State	9–2	4–1	2nd			
1974	Kent State	7–4	2–3	T–4th			
Kent State:		25–19–1	10–10				
Washington Huskies (Pacific-8/Pacific-10 Conference) (1975–1992)
1975	Washington	6–5	5–2	T–3rd			
1976	Washington	5–6	3–4	T–4th			
1977	Washington	8–4	6–1	1st	W Rose	9	10
1978	Washington	7–4	6–2	T–2nd			
1979	Washington	9–3	5–2	2nd	W Sun	11	11
1980	Washington	9–3	6–1	1st	L Rose	17	16
1981	Washington	10–2	6–2	1st	W Rose	7	10
1982	Washington	10–2	6–2	2nd	W Aloha	7	7
1983	Washington	8–4	5–2	2nd	L Aloha		
1984	Washington	11–1	6–1	2nd	W Orange	2	2
1985	Washington	7–5	5–3	T–4th	W Freedom		
1986	Washington	8–3–1	5–2–1	T–2nd	L Sun	17	18
1987	Washington	7–4–1	4–3–1	T–2nd	W Independence		
1988	Washington	6–5	3–5	T–6th			
1989	Washington	8–4	5–3	T–2nd	W Freedom	20	23
1990	Washington	10–2	7–1	1st	W Rose	5	5
1991	Washington	12–0	8–0	1st	W Rose	1	2
1992	Washington	9–3	6–2	T–1st	L Rose	10	11
Washington:		150–60–2	97–38–2				
Total:		175–79–3					
National championship Conference title Conference division title or championship game berth
^{#}Rankings from final Coaches Poll.; ^{°}Rankings from final AP Poll.

- Wins by MSU and UCLA in (1977) and ASU in (1979) were later vacated, yielding James' overall record in Washington 153–57–2 (.726) and conference record in 99–36–2 (.730). Overall James' record yielding 178–76–3 (.698). However those wins are recognized by Washington they aren't recognized by NCAA.

=== Pac-10 opponents ===
James' record at Washington against conference opponents (1975–1992)

Opponent	Wins	Losses	Ties	Pct.	Notes
Oregon State	15	1	0	.938	
California	12	2	0	.857	
Oregon	15	3	0	.833	Rivalry
Stanford	13	3	0	.813	
Washington State	13	5	0	.722	Apple Cup
Arizona	7	3	1	.682	
Arizona State ^{†}	8	5	0	.615	
USC	9	8	0	.529	
UCLA	5	8	1	.393	
TOTAL	97	38	2	.715	

† excludes non-conference loss to ASU (WAC) in 1975

- Wins by UCLA (1977) and ASU (1979) were later vacated, yielding 99–36–2 (.730)

== Coaching tree ==
James worked under five head coaches:

- Chuck Mather, Kansas (1956–1957)
- Perry Moss, Florida State (1959)
- Bill Peterson, Florida State (1960–1965)
- Bump Elliott, Michigan (1966–1967)
- Eddie Crowder, Colorado (1968–1970) (head coach at Colorado 1963–1973)

Thirteen of James' assistant coaches became head coaches in the NCAA or NFL:

- Dennis Fitzgerald, Kent State (1975–1977)
- Dick Scesniak, Kent State (1983–1985)
- Bob Stull, UMass (1984–1985), UTEP (1986–1988), Missouri (1989–1993)
- Keith Gilbertson, Idaho (1986–1988), California (1992–1995), Washington (2003–2004)
- Jim E. Mora, New Orleans Saints (1986–1996), Indianapolis Colts (1998–2001)
- Nick Saban, Toledo (1990), Michigan State (1995–1999), LSU (2000–2004), Miami Dolphins (2005–2006), Alabama (2007–2023)
- Gary Pinkel, Toledo (1991–2000), Missouri (2001–2015)
- Jim Lambright, Washington (1993–1998)
- Bill Wentworth, Denison (1993–1999)
- Chris Tormey, Idaho (1995–1999), Nevada (2000–2003)
- Jeff Woodruff, Eastern Michigan (2000–2003)
- Al Lavan, Delaware (2004–2010)
- Jim L. Mora, Atlanta Falcons (2004–2006), Seattle Seahawks (2009), UCLA (2012–2017), UConn (2022–2026), Colorado State (2026–present)

== See also ==
- List of presidents of the American Football Coaches Association
- Legends Poll
