= Tyrone Rodgers =

American football player (born 1969)

No. 91
- Position: Defensive tackle

Personal information
- Born: April 27, 1969 (age 57); Longview, Texas, U.S.
- Listed height: 6 ft 3 in (1.91 m)
- Listed weight: 271 lb (123 kg)

Career information
- High school: Phineas Banning (CA)
- College: Washington
- NFL draft: 1992: undrafted
- Expansion draft: 1995: 4th round, 8th overall pick

Career history
- Seattle Seahawks (1992–1994); Carolina Panthers (1995)*; BC Lions (1996); Winnipeg Blue Bombers (1997–1999); Grand Rapids Rampage (2000); Toronto Argonauts (2000–2001); Calgary Stampeders (2002)
- * Offseason or practice squad member only

Awards and highlights
- National champion (1991)

Career NFL statistics
- Tackles: 16
- Sacks: 1
- Stats at Pro Football Reference

Tyrone Dworin Rodgers (born April 27, 1969) is an American former professional football player who was a defensive tackle in the National Football League (NFL) and Canadian Football League (CFL). He played college football for the Washington Huskies. He played in the NFL for the Seattle Seahawks from 1992 to 1994.

== Early career ==
Rodgers played high school football at Banning High School in Wilmington, California, where he was teammates with Jamelle Holieway, Leroy Holt, Bob Whitfield, Courtney Hall, Mark Tucker, Ed Lalau, and Marvin Pollard. Rodgers played with a team stacked with talent, where several players went on to play in the NFL. In Rodgers' junior year, Banning won the L.A. City Section 4A championship, defeating their crosstown archrival Carson High School.

== College career ==
Rodgers originally signed his letter of intent with the University of Oklahoma. After a recruiting violation by the University of Oklahoma was exposed, the university was placed on probation and lost scholarships. The NCAA allowed players who were not involved in the recruiting scandal to transfer to other universities and not lose any eligibility, nor be required to sit out for a year.

Rodgers then transferred to the University of Washington, where he played with one of his high school and childhood friends, Terrence Powe. Rodgers helped engineer a Huskies defense that went undefeated and won the 1992 Rose Bowl. The Huskies went on to share the national championship with the Miami Hurricanes.

== Professional career ==
Rodgers signed as an undrafted defensive lineman with the Seattle Seahawks. playing three seasons with the team.
