= White Bear Lake, Minnesota =

City in Minnesota, United States

- City
- Seal
- Nicknames: Beartown, WBL
- Motto: City of Lakes and Legends
- Location of the city of White Bear Lake within Ramsey and Washington Counties in the state of Minnesota
- Coordinates: 45°03′50″N 93°0′30″W
- Country: United States
- State: Minnesota
- Counties: Ramsey, Washington
- Founded: 1858
- Incorporated (village): February 18, 1881
- Incorporated (city): October 11, 1921

Government
  - Mayor: Mary Nicklawske

Area
  - Total: 8.63 sq mi (22.36 km^{2})
  - Land: 8.05 sq mi (20.84 km^{2})
  - Water: 0.59 sq mi (1.53 km^{2})
- Elevation: 942 ft (287 m)

Population (2020)
  - Total: 24,883
  - Estimate (2022): 23,588
  - Density: 3,093.1/sq mi (1,194.24/km^{2})
- Time zone: UTC-6 (Central (CST))
  - Summer (DST): UTC-5 (CDT)
- ZIP codes: 55110, 55127
- Area code: 651
- FIPS code: 27-69970
- GNIS feature ID: 2397299
- Sales tax: 8.375%
- Website: whitebearlakemn.gov

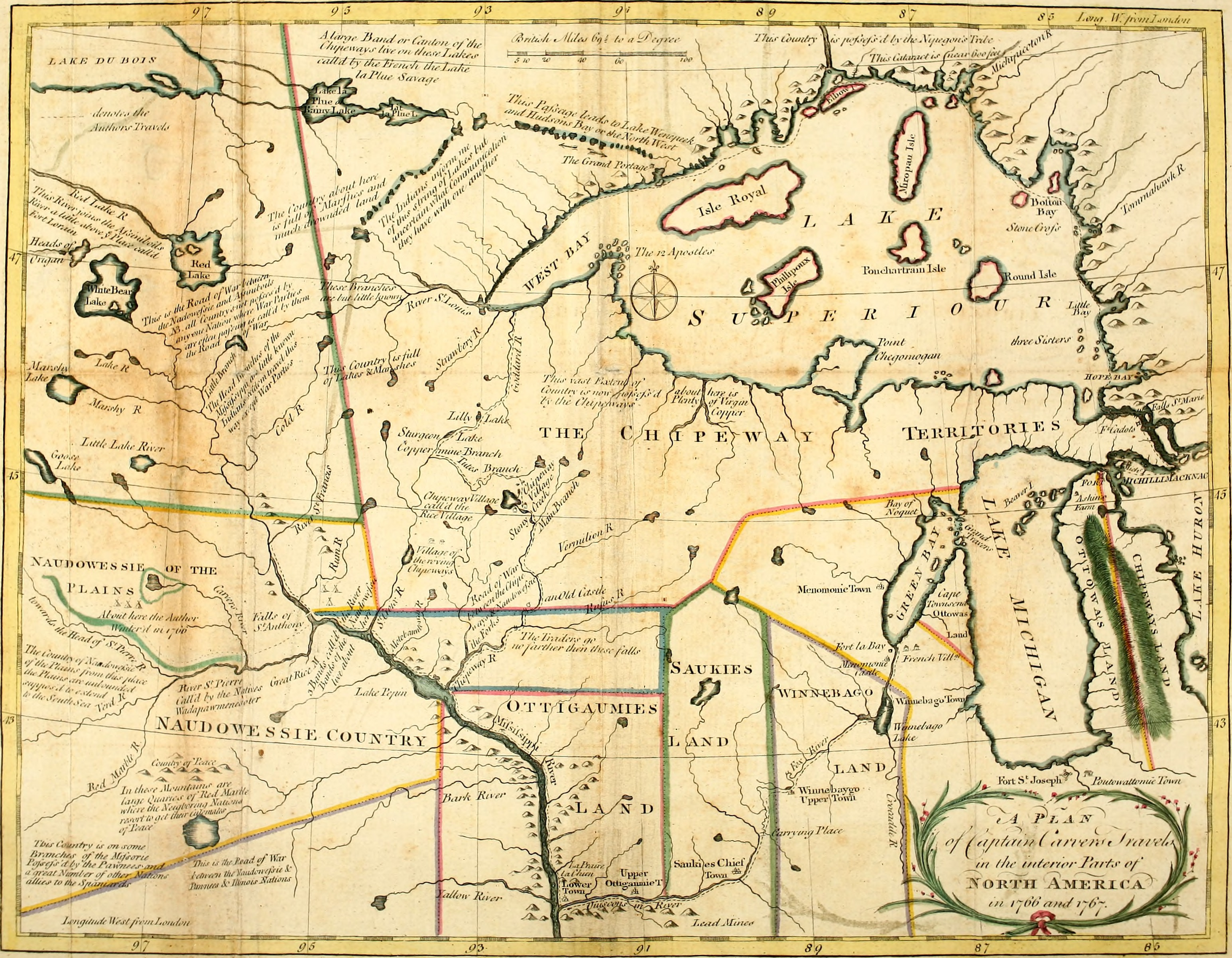
Jonathan Carvers 1766 map shows the location of White Bear lake in the historic narrative as being adjacent to Red Lake. This White Bear Lake is located in Pope County, Minnesota and is known today as Lake Minnewaska in White Bear Lake Township, not to be confused with White Bear Township in Ramsey County.

White Bear Lake is a city in Ramsey County in the state of Minnesota, United States. A small portion of the city also extends into Washington County. The population was 24,883 at the 2020 census. The city is located on White Bear Lake, one of the largest lakes in the Minneapolis–Saint Paul metropolitan area. The lake is a large lake that is home to many different species of fish including largemouth bass, smallmouth bass, northern pike, and a variety of other species.

== Origin of name ==
The city is named after its largest lake, White Bear Lake. American writers have delivered differing versions of the legend that explains the origin of the name. In her book Indian Legends of Minnesota, Mrs. Carl T. Thayer writes that "It is said that a Sioux maiden fell in love with a Chippewa brave. She, the daughter of the Chief, on learning that her father planned war against the Chippewa, ran to her lover and warned him. The brave went alone into the Sioux village to ask for peace and the hand of the maiden. Before the Chief would agree, the Chippewa would have to do a brave deed."

"The lovers usually met on Manitou Island. One day, as the brave approached the Island, anticipating a meeting with his beloved, he saw, to his horror, a great white bear attacking her. He dashed to her rescue. Freed, she ran to get help from her father and the other Sioux. Returning, they saw the brave sink his knife into the bear. But too late, they both fell to the ground dead. Slowly, as they watched, the spirits of the brave and the bear rose from their prone bodies. It is said that even today, as night falls, the spirits of the bear and the brave wander the Island eternally in search of each other."

In Mark Twain's memoir Life on the Mississippi, he offers a different ending, relaying that "… the warrior, with one plunge of the blade of his knife, opened the crimson sluices of death, and the dying bear relaxed his hold. "That night, there was no more sleep for the band or the lovers, and as the young and the old danced about the carcass of the dead monster, the gallant warrior was presented with another plume, and ere another moon had set he had a living treasure added to his heart. Their children for many years played upon the skin of the white bear – from which the lake derives its name, and the maiden and the brave remembered long the fearful scene and rescue that made them one, for Kis-se-me-pa and Ka-go-ga could never forget their fearful encounter with the huge monster that came so near sending them to the happy hunting ground."

== History ==
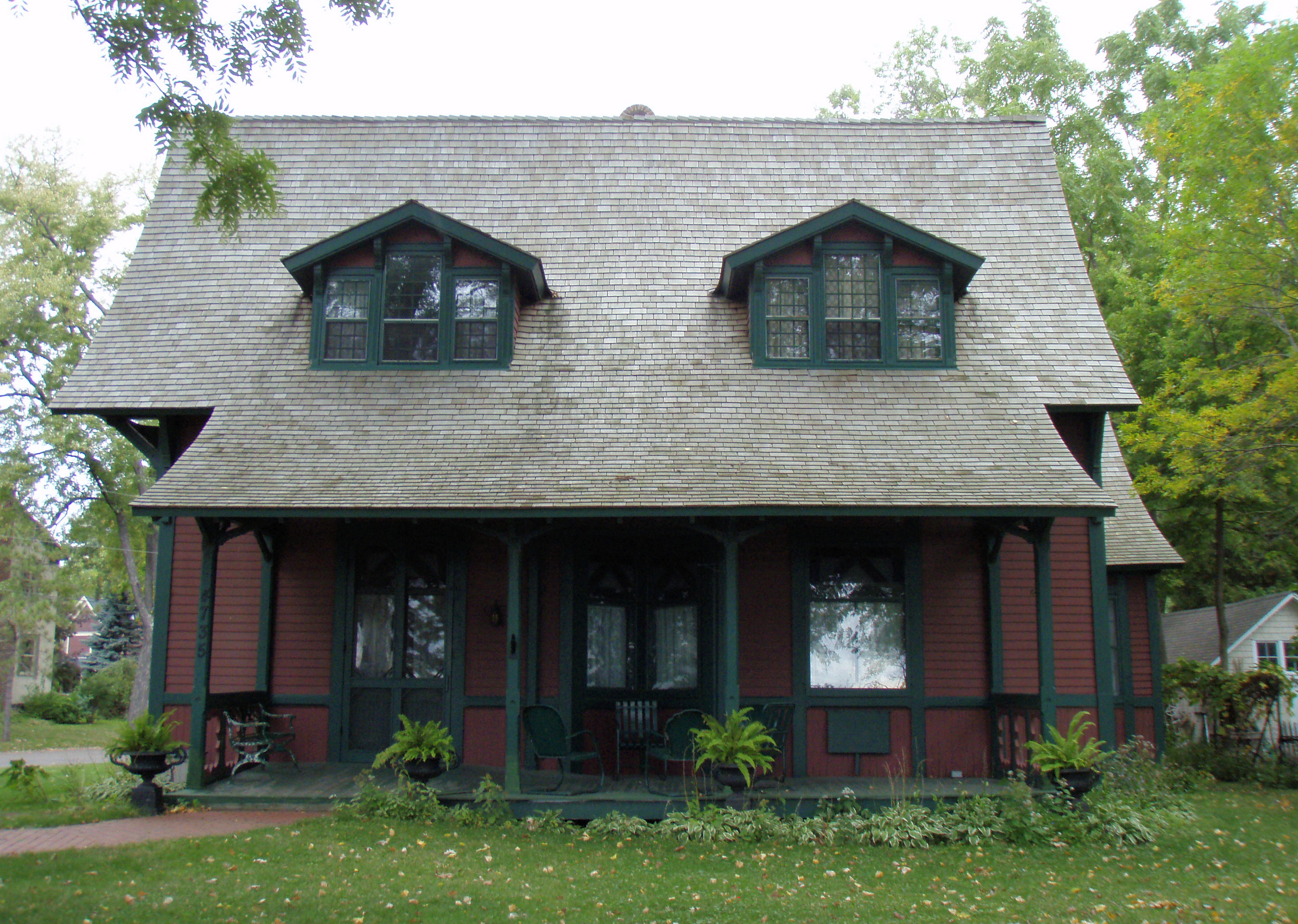
The Charles P. Noyes Cottage dates back to the days when White Bear Lake was a resort town.

The railroad was the largest man-made happening in White Bear Lake. On September 10, 1868, the Lake Superior and Mississippi Railroad officially opened the extension to White Bear Lake. This was a gala occasion. Ten platform cars of 300 men and four passenger cars for 200 ladies made the trip from St. Paul.

By 1874, Mark Twain had included White Bear Lake as the resort in his "Life on the Mississippi." The "American Travelers Journal" 1881 proclaimed, "One of the most popular resorts in the magic northlands is White Bear Lake." Barnum's hotel became the Leip House, featuring a ballroom, billiard room, dancing pavilion, bowling alley, and boats. F.C. Williams opened the Williams House on the Murray property on Lake Avenue. James Waters opened the White Bear House at the depot. In 1879, the Ramaley Pavilion was opened and described as "perhaps the finest structure around the lake" (Breeze 1890). There was Lake Side Cottage on Lake north of 6th and "Château gay." Shady Side, Bachelor's Rest and Hotel Benson were three of the resorts at Bald Eagle Lake.

The Cottage Park summer residents built a club house in 1881 where they had their meals, entertainment and social life. In 1881, the Manitou Implement Co. developed the Island for cottages with the added important feature of water works. The "Fillebrown" house on Lake Avenue was built in 1879 by C.P. Noyes. It was purchased in 1881 by Judge George Young and in 1905 purchased by the J. Walter Fillebrown family who donated the house to the White Bear Lake Area Historical Society in the 1970s.

The City of White Bear Lake was incorporated on October 11, 1921.

In 1940, Nellie Geraldine Best painted a tempera mural, Early Voyageurs at Portage, as part of the WPA's nationwide mural project for the post office in White Bear Lake, Minnesota. The location of this mural is unknown. It may have been removed during a post office remodeling.

White Bear Lake High School and Mariner High School merged in 1983 to form White Bear Lake Area High School. There are still two buildings, the North Campus and South Campus, which are now White Bear Lake High School (North Campus building) and Mariner Middle School (South Campus building). North Campus (White Bear Lake High School) held classes for freshman and sophomores while South Campus (the former Mariner High School) held classes for juniors and seniors. The two buildings had a combined total of about 3,000 students.

The murder of three-year-old Dennis Jurgens in 1965 at the hands of his adoptive mother, Lois Jurgens, was arguably the biggest scandal to hit the town with her conviction in 1987. The story was recounted in Barry Siegel's true crime novel A Death in White Bear Lake.

In 1953, the Lakeshore Players Community Theater was organized. Lakeshore Players formerly operated out of a former church building constructed in 1889, at 4820 Stewart Avenue. In 2018 they moved to a new building in 2018 next to the White Bear Center for the Arts.

The White Bear Center for the Arts was officially organized on May 16, 1968 and moved to their new location at 4971 Long Avenue in the fall of 2013.

The White Bear Lake Area Historical Society was incorporated on September 25, 1970 and gathers, preserves and shares the stories of the five communities that touch the shore of White Bear Lake – Birchwood, Dellwood, Mahtomedi, White Bear Lake, and White Bear Township.

In 2019, voters approved the largest school bond measure in the state to support the school district building a brand new high school in downtown White Bear Lake and renovate elementary and middle schools across the city. The new school opened for the 2024/2025 school year meaning all students in grades nine through twelve now attended the same campus in the heart of city. The new school campus also includes sports facilities to ensure school sponsored events help out the city center.

== Geography ==
According to the United States Census Bureau, the city has a total area of 8.66 square miles (22.43 km^{2}), of which 8.02 square miles (20.77 km^{2}) is land and 0.64 square miles (1.66 km^{2}) is water.

U.S. Highway 61, Ramsey County Highway 96, Minnesota State Highway 96, Interstate 35E, and Interstate 694 are five of the main routes in the city.

== Demographics ==
Historical population
Census	Pop.	Note	%±
1880	435		—
1890	1,356		211.7%
1900	1,288		−5.0%
1910	1,505		16.8%
1920	2,022		34.4%
1930	2,600		28.6%
1940	2,858		9.9%
1950	3,646		27.6%
1960	12,849		252.4%
1970	23,313		81.4%
1980	22,538		−3.3%
1990	24,704		9.6%
2000	24,325		−1.5%
2010	23,797		−2.2%
2020	24,883		4.6%
2022 (est.)	23,588		−5.2%
U.S. Decennial Census; 2020 Census

=== 2020 census ===
As of the 2020 census, White Bear Lake had a population of 24,883. The median age was 41.8 years. 20.4% of residents were under the age of 18 and 21.6% of residents were 65 years of age or older. For every 100 females there were 91.9 males, and for every 100 females age 18 and over there were 87.8 males age 18 and over.

100.0% of residents lived in urban areas, while 0.0% lived in rural areas.

There were 10,447 households in White Bear Lake, of which 26.0% had children under the age of 18 living in them. Of all households, 45.7% were married-couple households, 16.8% were households with a male householder and no spouse or partner present, and 30.2% were households with a female householder and no spouse or partner present. About 31.5% of all households were made up of individuals and 16.2% had someone living alone who was 65 years of age or older.

There were 10,847 housing units, of which 3.7% were vacant. The homeowner vacancy rate was 0.7% and the rental vacancy rate was 4.6%.

Racial composition as of the 2020 census
Race	Number	Percent
White	20,531	82.5%
Black or African American	1,034	4.2%
American Indian and Alaska Native	115	0.5%
Asian	1,185	4.8%
Native Hawaiian and Other Pacific Islander	9	0.0%
Some other race	534	2.1%
Two or more races	1,475	5.9%
Hispanic or Latino (of any race)	1,361	5.5%

=== 2010 census ===
As of the census of 2010, there were 23,797 people, 9,945 households, and 6,304 families living in the city. The population density was 2,967.2 inhabitants per square mile (1,145.6/km^{2}). There were 10,479 housing units at an average density of 1,306.6 per square mile (504.5/km^{2}). The racial makeup of the city was 90.1% White, 2.5% African American, 0.4% Native American, 3.5% Asian, 0.9% from other races, and 2.5% from two or more races. Hispanic or Latino of any race were 3.3% of the population.

There were 9,945 households, of which 28.0% had children under the age of 18 living with them, 48.2% were married couples living together, 10.9% had a female householder with no husband present, 4.3% had a male householder with no wife present, and 36.6% were non-families. 30.0% of all households were made up of individuals, and 13.3% had someone living alone who was 65 years of age or older. The average household size was 2.35 and the average family size was 2.92.

The median age in the city was 40.6 years. 21.7% of residents were under the age of 18; 8.6% were between the ages of 18 and 24; 24.9% were from 25 to 44; 28% were from 45 to 64; and 16.8% were 65 years of age or older. The gender makeup of the city was 48.3% male and 51.7% female.

== Business ==
Smarte Carte, a company that provides baggage carts to many airports around the world, is headquartered in White Bear Lake, near Interstate 35E and Ramsey County Highway 96. International Paper, one of the largest pulp and paper companies in the world, operates a significant facility in northern White Bear Lake on 9th Street across from Podvin Park. Next door is Magnepan, a manufacturer of high-end audio loudspeakers.

Explore Minnesota ranked Cup and Cone among the top 50 places to eat Ice Cream in the State of Minnesota.

== Public schools ==
The White Bear Lake Area School District includes nine elementary sites, two middle school sites, and two high school sites. In addition to these, there is also an area learning center located at the former Golfview Elementary site. The White Bear Lake Area Schools operate as Independent School District 624.

=== Elementary schools (grades K–5) ===
- Birch Lake (1966)
- Hugo (1961), located in Hugo
- Lakeaires (1960)
- Lincoln (1952)
- Oneka (2006), located in Hugo
- Otter Lake (1988), located in White Bear Township
- Matoska International (1962), Originally Parkview Elementary, with the Centerpoint program (school within a school)
- North Star (2022), located in Hugo
- Vadnais Heights (1950), located in Vadnais Heights
- Willow Lane (1965)

=== Middle schools (grades 6–8) ===
- Central (built in 1918 as WBL High School, with additions in '1924, '28, '35, '53, '98, '05)
- Sunrise Park (1959), closed after the 2023-2024 school year and reopened in fall of 2024 as Mariner Middle School in the building originally named White Bear Lake Area High School, South Campus.

=== High schools (grades 9–12) ===
- White Bear Lake Area High School, North Campus (1964): grades 9 & 10
  - Opened as White Bear Lake Area High School serving grades 9-12 for the 2024-2025 school year.
- White Bear Lake Area High School, South Campus (1972): grades 11 & 12
  - 2023-2024 was the final year this building housed a high school program and opened as Mariner Middle School for the 2024-2025 school year.
- White Bear Lake Area Learning Center (1964, former Golfview Elementary School): grades 9–12

=== Colleges ===
- Century College

== Private schools ==
- White Bear Montessori School (16 months through sixth grade)
- Frassati Catholic Academy (grades Preschool through 8) (Merging of St. Mary of the Lake School and St. Pius X School)
- Liberty Classical Academy (grades Pre-K through 12)
- Magnuson Christian School (grades K through 8)
- St. Anne's Academy (grades 1–12)

== Activities ==
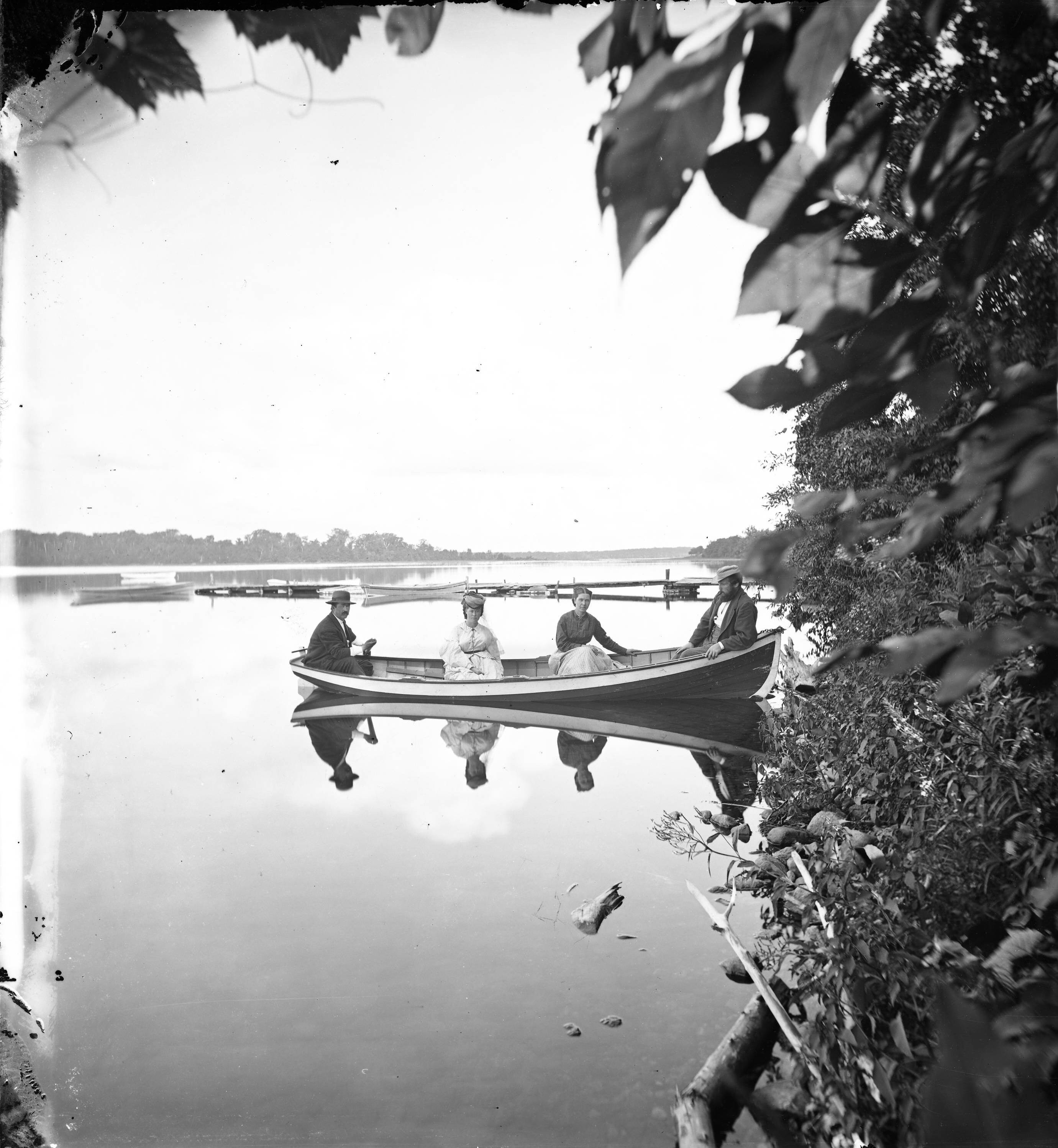
Boaters on White Bear Lake.

In the summer, many families take sailboat rides or go tubing. There is also a Marketfest festival that happens every Thursday night in Downtown White Bear consisting of many different food trucks and games for all ages.

During the winter months, ice fishing is popular on the lake, along with snowmobiling and cross-country skiing. If ice conditions are free of surface snow, iceboats can be found sailing at high speeds. The downtown area features restaurants, bars, and a variety of unique shops and services.

== Notable people ==
- Tony Benshoof, Olympic athlete competing in luge
- Brian Bonin, 1992 White Bear High School graduate, University of Minnesota Golden Gophers Men's Hockey, 1996 Hobey Baker Award winner
- Justin Braun, 2005 White Bear High School graduate, University of Massachusetts Amherst hockey, NHL defenseman for the Philadelphia Flyers
- Jim Brunzell, 1967 White Bear High School graduate, University of Minnesota football and track & field, retired wrestler (Jumpin' Jim Brunzell)
- Bill Butters, 1969 White Bear High School graduate, University of Minnesota hockey, retired defenseman in the WHA and NHL
- Ryan Carter, 2002 White Bear High School graduate, Minnesota St. University hockey, NHL center for the Minnesota Wild
- Josh A. Cassada, NASA Astronaut
- Kevin M. Chandler, Minnesota state legislator and lawyer
- Gregory L. Dahl, Minnesota state legislator and lawyer
- Rick Danmeier, 1970 White Bear High School graduate, football player White Bear Lake High School, straight-on kicker for the NFL's Minnesota Vikings (1977–1982)
- Michael Djupstrom, 1998 White Bear High School graduate, composer
- Moose Goheen (1894–1979), NHL hockey player, Member of Professional Hockey Hall of Fame, class of 1952 Moose Goheen – Hall of Fame Bio
- Nora Greenwald (a.k.a. Molly Holly), former WWE Diva
- Trent Hafdahl, White Bear Lake Class of 2004, Lead guitarist and founding member of After the Burial
- Matt Henderson, 1992 White Bear High School graduate, University of North Dakota Men's Hockey, former NHL player
- Orrin Henry Ingram Sr. (a.k.a. Hank Ingram) (1904–1963), American heir and businessman
- Steve Janaszak, hockey goalie, 1975 Hill-Murray School graduate, University of Minnesota, 1980 U.S. Olympic "Miracle on Ice" Team
- Bradley Joseph, composer, keyboardist with Yanni and Sheena Easton
- Lois Jurgens, murderer
- Devoney Looser, Jane Austen scholar
- Harry Mares, educator, Minnesota state legislator, and mayor of White Bear lake
- Maurice D. McCollar, Minnesota state legislator and chiropractor
- Joe Miller (1850–1891), Major League Baseball player
- John Watson Milton, Minnesota State Senator and writer
- Paul M. Nakasone, United States Army General, Commander United States Army Cyber Command
- Thomas Warren Newcome, Minnesota legislator, lawyer, and mayor of White Bear Lake
- Jeff Parker, 1983 White Bear Mariner High School graduate, Michigan St. University hockey, NHL with Hartford, Buffalo, Pittsburgh
- Alice Peacock, folk singer
- Joel Reichow, distance runner
- Robert W. Reif, Minnesota state legislator and physician
- Elwyn "Doc" Romnes (1909–1984), former NHL player
- Brad Stanius, Minnesota state legislator and mayor of White Bear Lake
- David Tanabe, hockey player, Hill-Murray School, University of Wisconsin hockey, NHL's Carolina Hurricanes, Phoenix Coyotes, Boston Bruins
- Jacob Volkmann, UFC fighter and chiropractic
