= Autopsy (TV series) =

- Genre: Documentary
- Directed by: Arthur Ginsberg
- Starring: Michael Baden
- Narrated by: Marlene Sanders
- Country of origin: United States
- Original language: English
- No. of seasons: 9

Production
- Producer: Gaby Monet
- Editor: Johanna Giebelhaus
- Camera setup: Mead Hunt

Autopsy is a television series of HBO's America Undercover documentary series. Dr. Michael Baden, a real-life forensic pathologist, is the primary analyst, and has been personally involved in many of the cases that are reviewed.

== Episodes and cases ==
- Autopsy: Confessions of a Medical Examiner (1994)
  - The Case of Joan Bent: Murdered in 1986, the analysis of Joan Bent's stomach contents caught her killer.
  - Finding a tattooed arm in the belly of a shark helps solve a missing persons' case.
  - The Case of Marybeth Tinning: Marybeth Tinning was discovered to have killed nine children over 14 years, a stunning example of Munchausen syndrome by proxy.
  - The Case of Billy Martin: The legendary New York Yankees manager died in 1989 in a single-car accident; Dr. Baden shows that he was not the driver.
  - The Green Haven Prison Murder: Dr. Baden uses dental records to find the killer of a female prison guard.
  - The Case of LaToya Thomas: A 13-year-old girl is wrongfully convicted of strangling her mother to death; Dr. Baden helps to exonerate her.
  - The Iceman: Analysis of a preserved corpse found in the Swiss Alps determines it to be 5,000 years old.
- Autopsy 2: Voices From the Dead (1995)
  - The Case of the Unidentified Torso: A dismembered torso is identified through its pelvic bones as the missing Joyce Klindt, who was murdered by her husband, James.
  - Maggots In Evidence: A bathtub filled with filthy water, a skeleton, and maggots leads examiners to analyze the maggots to determine suicide by barbiturate overdose.
  - The Good Doctor: The investigation of Dr. John Cavaness, who murdered two of his four sons.
  - The Jellyfish Case: An unidentified body that washes ashore in a plastic bag is identified as murder victim Keeran Carter, who was identified through the serial numbers on her breast implants.
  - The Angel of Death: The exhumation of several bodies convicts "angel of death" serial killer Donald Harvey, a nurse's aide at Drake Hospital in Cincinnati, Ohio.
  - The Ron Settles Case: Ron Settles, a star college football running back, is arrested and declared an apparent suicide by hanging. Dr. Baden proves his death was a result of a police choke hold.
  - A Mother's Instinct: The death of 4-year old Dennis Jurgens, whose biological mother, Jerry Sherwood, learns of her son's death years after she gave him up for adoption. Lois Jurgens was later convicted of the murder of her adopted son.
  - The Fun House Dummy: A fun house dummy is found to be the mummified corpse of a Wild West outlaw named Elmer McCurdy, who was shot to death in 1911.
  - Forensic reconstruction of King Tut's face.
- Autopsy 3: Voices From the Grave (1996)
  - Intro: The need for modern forensic science comes of age with Jack the Ripper, the first modern serial killer.
  - The Sam Kastanis Case: Pathologists prove that Margaret Kastanis murdered her three children before committing suicide, exonerating her husband, who was on trial for the slaying of his family.
  - A Killer's Signature: The murder of Milagros Satero, whose killer was found through examining the contents of her stomach.
  - The Cheater: The December 1983 disappearance of singer Walter Scott culminates in a conviction for double homicide when his body is found 4 years later floating in his wife's lover's back yard cistern.
  - The Story of Anna: The signature bite marks left by an abducted 11-year-old girl's braces on her attacker's body convicts him of rape and attempted murder.
  - The Face From The Grave: A "faceprint" of Juana Gillette's face on the trash bag that suffocated her convicts her husband, Ronald, of her murder.
  - The Black Widow: The attempted murder of Reverend Dwight Moore by arsenic poisoning leads to the discovery that his second wife, Blanche Taylor Moore, is a serial killer.
  - The Mystery of Folly Island: Nineteen decapitated skeletons are discovered in an island off Charleston, South Carolina, and found to be Union soldiers, members of Wild's African Brigade.
- Autopsy 4: The Dead Speak (1997)
  - A Cry In The Night: Belinda Wood is murdered by her downstairs neighbor, who torches their apartment building to destroy the crime scene.
  - The Crypt Keeper: An elderly man vanishes from his New Orleans home; two decades later, an investigation is needed when a skeleton is found in a hidden room in the basement.
  - The Michelle Wallace Case: Photographer Michelle Wallace vanishes in the Colorado Rockies; two braids of hair change the case from a disappearance to a homicide, and help convict her killer.
  - The Perfect Witness: DNA analysis of cat hairs brings a killer to justice on Canada's Prince Edward Island.
  - The Case of The Masked Man: Paula Sims claims her baby girl was abducted by a masked intruder; her bones, found later in the woods near her home, shed no light on her death. When the Sims' second daughter is also kidnapped, a forensic examination of the infant's body convicts Paula for both murders.
  - Case of The Missing Cowboy: The investigation of a dismembered and morphine-filled torso and head convicts a rancher mother of three in the death of her boyfriend, Casey Elliott.
  - The Bog People: The peat bogs of Europe yield up perfectly preserved bodies, all violently murdered over 2,000 years ago.
- Autopsy 5: Dead Men Do Tell Tales (1998)
  - Intro: History of outlawed autopsy and body-snatching to provide bodies for dissection.
  - The Robert Curley Case: A university electrician dies from a mystery ailment; high thallium levels in his hair provide a timeline that proves systematic poisoning by his new bride.
  - The Collector: FBI profilers use a Dallas serial killer's obsession with trophies to arrest "the eyeball killer", Charles Albright.
  - Murder in Paradise: Forensic analysis of a rack of antlers leads to the arrest of a poacher for the slaughter of Charger, a famous elk in Yellowstone National Park.
  - The Roy Kirk Case: Slumlord Roy Kirk is apprehended for murdering and dismembering his complaining neighbor, Ann Hoover; examination also shows how the handcuffed and shackled Kirk hanged himself in the police van en route to the station.
  - A Bad Impression: Two prostitute murderers of a pimp are identified by a bite impression left in a wad of chewing gum.
  - The Videotape Murder: A video of skaters in a park is enhanced to prove that a suspect with missing fingertips did not commit a murder caught on tape.
  - The Mary Ann Powell Case: Strange scratch patterns in the aluminum seat of his newly purchased boat connects Warren Powell to the murder and disposal of the body of his pregnant young wife.
- Autopsy 6: Secrets of the Dead (1999)
  - The Case of the Severed Hand: Fingerprinting a waterlogged hand found in the Manatee River leads to a violated corpse and a voodoo practitioner running a funeral parlor.
  - A Fatal Attraction: Hairs found at the crime scene of Andrew Katrinak's missing wife and baby convict his ex-girlfriend of their abduction and murder.
  - The Margo Prade Story: A physician is found shot in her car; the unusual imprint of only half a bite mark convicts her husband, a decorated police captain with an upper plate of false teeth, of her murder.
  - The Telltale Imprint: An incriminating lipstick print left on the glass door convicts a robber, who held up the bank in drag.
  - An American Dream: When Jack Reeves's third wife, a Filipina immigrant, disappears, he reveals his second wife, a Korean immigrant, drowned at Lake Whitney and his first wife, Sharon, committed suicide by pulling a shotgun trigger with her big toe. An exhumation of Sharon's body proves her death was a homicide. Reeves was convicted of the murders of his first and third wife, whose remains were found in a shallow grave at Lake Whitney.
  - The Strange Obsession of Dr. Carl von Cosel: An elderly physician's fixation on preserving the corpse of his lovely young tuberculosis patient in 1930s Key West results in grave robbing and necrophilia.
- Autopsy 7: Dead Man Talking (2001)
  - Maggots For The Defense: A maggot timeline exonerates a wrongly-convicted Boy Scout leader for murder.
  - Criss/Cross: Marks left on a body by stolen jewelry thwart a pact by two Hoboken husbands to murder each other's wives.
  - The Good Doctor: Dr. John Schneeberger drugs and rapes a patient and his stepdaughter, evading arrest for years by implanting a vial of another's blood in his arm to beating DNA testing.
  - The Sue Snow Case: An incorrect determination of her husband's death prompts Stella Nickell to kill again with cyanide, in the first product tampering case in the United States.
  - Til Death Do Us Part: An autopsy of Chang and Eng Bunker, the famous conjoined twin brothers whose nationality became the basis for the term "Siamese twins".
- Autopsy 8: Dead Giveaway (2002)
  - Pure Evil: Investigation of the remains of their victims leads to the apprehension of Canadian serial rapists and murderers Paul Bernardo and Karla Homolka.
  - The Lady Vanishes: DNA on the envelope of a suicide note proves that a "missing" wife was being impersonated by her murderous husband.
  - Mail Rape: A serial rapist attempts to throw doubt on his case by mailing a DNA sample to an accomplice.
  - Blood Hound of Detroit: A blood scenting dog ties up a case that begins with body parts found in a dumpster.
  - The Medicine Man: Chief Medical Examiner William Sybers wrongly assumes that embalming will hide all the evidence that he murdered his wife.
  - Belle of Them All: The 1931 capture of an elderly woman for poisoning her boyfriend reveals her to be notorious Norwegian-American serial killer Belle Gunness, who murdered her children and prospective husbands decades ago, burying their bodies on her pig farm before faking her own death.
- Autopsy 9: Dead Awakening (2003)
  - A Baby's Cry: Laser light on a baby's body reveals bruises, proving her stepfather to be responsible for her death.
  - A Deadly Fare: DNA in a discarded tissue helps convict the murderer of a Banff cabdriver.
  - Love Thy Neighbor: The thallium poisoning of an entire family is tracked to their next door neighbor, George Trepal, a murderous games-playing chemist.
  - In Your Face: Laser light reveals an impression left on a truck's airbag, convicting a suspect in a multiple-fatality hit and run.
  - Thread of Evidence: Carpet fibers lead to the apprehension of Steven Brian Pennell, the U.S. 40 serial killer.
  - Ask Dr. Baden: An online request to evaluate a crime scene leads to a couple's deaths being reclassified as homicides.
- An Actual Autopsy and A Re-Examination of "Autopsy's" Most Complex Cases (2003)
  - Dr. Baden takes the audience step-by-step through a genuine autopsy and looks back on unusually difficult cases.
  - The Black Widow
  - The Marybeth Tinning Story
  - Pure Evil
  - The Angel of Death
- Ask Dr. Baden: An Autopsy Special (2005) (referred to also as Autopsy 10 on the Autopsy website)
- Autopsy 11: Sex, Lies and Murder... (2006)
  - The Love Bird: A loyal pet cockatoo's attack on his owner's murderer leads to a conviction.
  - Justice for Jaime:
  - Lasting Impression: The imprint of a license plate number on a hit and run victim leads to the driver's arrest and conviction.
  - He Said...She Said:
- Autopsy: Post Mortem with Dr. Michael Baden (2008)
  - The assassination of John F. Kennedy in 1963.
  - The royal Romanov family in Russia in 1918.
  - The deaths of Sid Vicious and his girlfriend Nancy Spungen four months apart in 1978–79.
  - The double-murder case involving O. J. Simpson in 1994.
  - Illnesses and deaths in first responders due to exposure to toxic chemicals at Ground Zero in the hours and days after the September 11 attacks.
