= Phineas Banning High School =

Banning High School

Location
- 1527 Lakme Avenue; Wilmington, California 90744; United States; 33.793788°N 118.261295°W

Information
- Type: Public
- Motto: Once a Pilot, Always a Pilot
- Established: 1926
- School district: Los Angeles Unified School District
- NCES District ID: 0622710
- NCES School ID: 062271002838
- Principal: Adela Retana
- Teaching staff: 138.63 (on an FTE basis)
- Grades: 9–12
- Enrollment: 2,422 (2024–25)
  - Male: 1,259
  - Female: 1,163
- Student to teacher ratio: 17.47
- Colors: Red, black, and white
- Athletics conference: Marine League; CIF Los Angeles City Section
- Mascot: The Pilot
- Rival: San Pedro High School, Carson High School
- Website: banninghs.lausd.org

Phineas Banning High School is located in the Wilmington neighborhood of Los Angeles, California, and is a part of the Los Angeles Unified School District.

== History ==
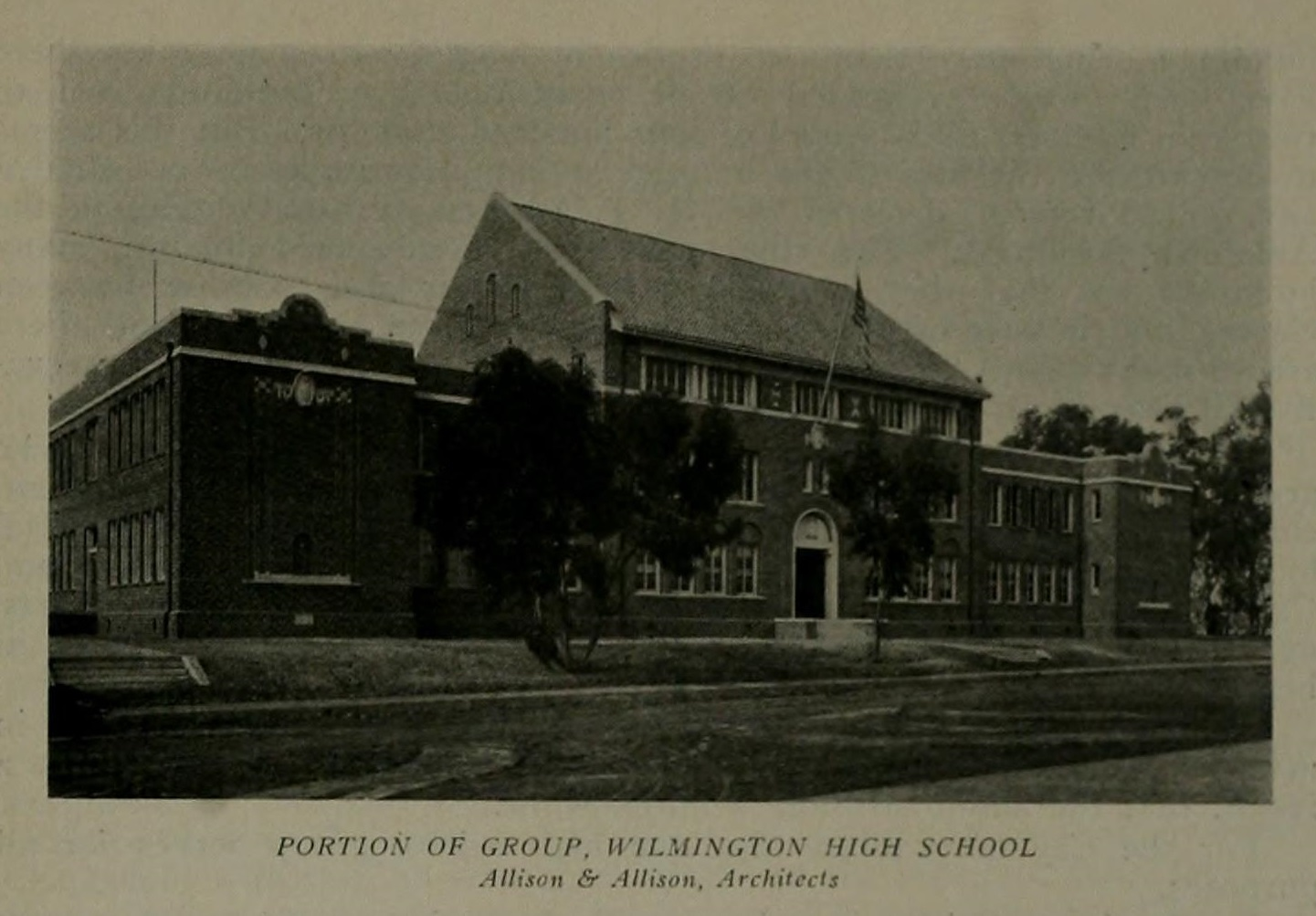
Original campus of Wilmington High School, demolished after replacement by a new campus and damage from the 1933 Long Beach earthquake

Founded as Wilmington High School, Banning High School was renamed in honor of General Phineas Banning when a newer facility at Avalon Boulevard and Pacific Coast Highway was opened in 1926. The red brick building was a landmark in the Wilmington town for many years. The ivy covered brick building suffered damage in the 1971 Sylmar earthquake and was torn down in 1973. For three years, classes were held in bungalows while the new building was being constructed. In fall 1975, the new building was opened on the grounds with a Lakme Avenue address. Along with the new building, a new gymnasium and swimming pool were added to the campus—the home of the Banning Pilots.

It was in the Los Angeles City High School District until 1961, when it merged into LAUSD.

After several years of repeated failure to improve its unsatisfactory performance, Banning High School entered LAUSD's Public School Choice process in 2012, which allowed teacher teams to develop reform plans. As a result, the Banning High School campus is slated to be divided into two schools: Banning High School (since state law prevents failing schools from changing their names) and the Banning Academies of Creative and Innovative Sciences (BACIS), a teacher-designed school with a design based on current educational research. BACIS was scheduled to open as a Small Learning Community in Fall 2013 and to become a separate school on the shared campus in Fall 2014. Its website describes itself as "composed of three themed academies, the Academy of Manufacturing and Engineering, the Academy of Computer Science and Digital Arts, and the Business and Technology Magnet."

== Demographics ==
As of the school year 2024–25, there were a total of 2,422 students with the following racial/ethic enrollment:

- 94.01% Hispanic (2,277)
- 1.94% White (49)
- 1.65% Black (40)
- 1.16% Asian (28)
- <1% Native Hawaiian / Pacific Islander (18)
- <1%Two or More Races (11)
- <1% Native American / Alaska Native (1)

== Facilities ==
A new building was built in 1975 to replace the 'old' red ivy covered brick building, which was damaged during the 1971 Sylmar earthquake and was a landmark in Wilmington for many years. A new gym and a swimming pool were added to the campus.

== Notable Alumni ==
- Tonie Campbell Olympic Bronze medalist
- Michael Chambers
- Vince Ferragamo

• Jack Gifford

- Jeff Griffin
- Dan Guerrero
- Courtney Hall

• Wilder W. Hartley (Los Angeles City Council member)

- Jamelle Holieway
- Leroy Holt
- Steve Lewis
- Frank Manumaleuna
- Fred Matua
- Freeman McNeil

• Bryan Proby

- Danny Reece
- Steve Rivera
- Tyrone Rodgers
- Ron Settles
- Thuy Trang, actress
- Rodney Agatupu Anoaʻi, WWF Yokozuna 1992-1998
- Mark Tucker
- Joel Olivares
- Peter "Navy" Tuiasosopo
- Bob Whitfield
- Stanley Wilson
- Brett Young — former CFL defensive back.
- Mike Busby — former MLB pitcher for the St. Louis Cardinals.
- Travis Davis — former NFL safety.

• Ernie Kell — mayor of Long Beach, California from 1984 to 1994"
