= Senator Dahl =

Senator Dahl or Dahle may refer to:

- Clarence P. Dahl (1892–1976), North Dakota State Senate
- Gary G. Dahl (1940–2023), Illinois State Senate
- Gregory L. Dahl (born 1952), Minnesota State Senate
- Brian Dahle (born 1965), California State Senate
- Kevin Dahle (born 1960), Minnesota State Senate
- Megan Dahle (born 1975), California State Senate
