= Jeff Griffin =

American football player (born 1958)

No. 35, 45
- Position: Cornerback

Personal information
- Born: July 19, 1958 (age 68); Carson, California, U.S.
- Listed height: 6 ft 0 in (1.83 m)
- Listed weight: 185 lb (84 kg)

Career information
- High school: Phineas Banning (Los Angeles, California)
- College: Utah
- NFL draft: 1981: 3rd round, 61st overall pick

Career history
- St. Louis Cardinals (1981–1985); Philadelphia Eagles (1987)

Career NFL statistics
- Interceptions: 4
- Fumble recoveries: 2
- Sacks: 1
- Stats at Pro Football Reference

Jeffery Earl Griffin (born July 19, 1958) is an American former professional football player who was a defensive back in the National Football League (NFL) for the St. Louis Cardinals and the Philadelphia Eagles.

== Early career ==
Griffin played high school football at Banning High School in Wilmington, California.

He played college football at the University of Utah and was selected in the third round of the 1981 NFL draft.
