= A Death in White Bear Lake =

Book by Barry Siegel

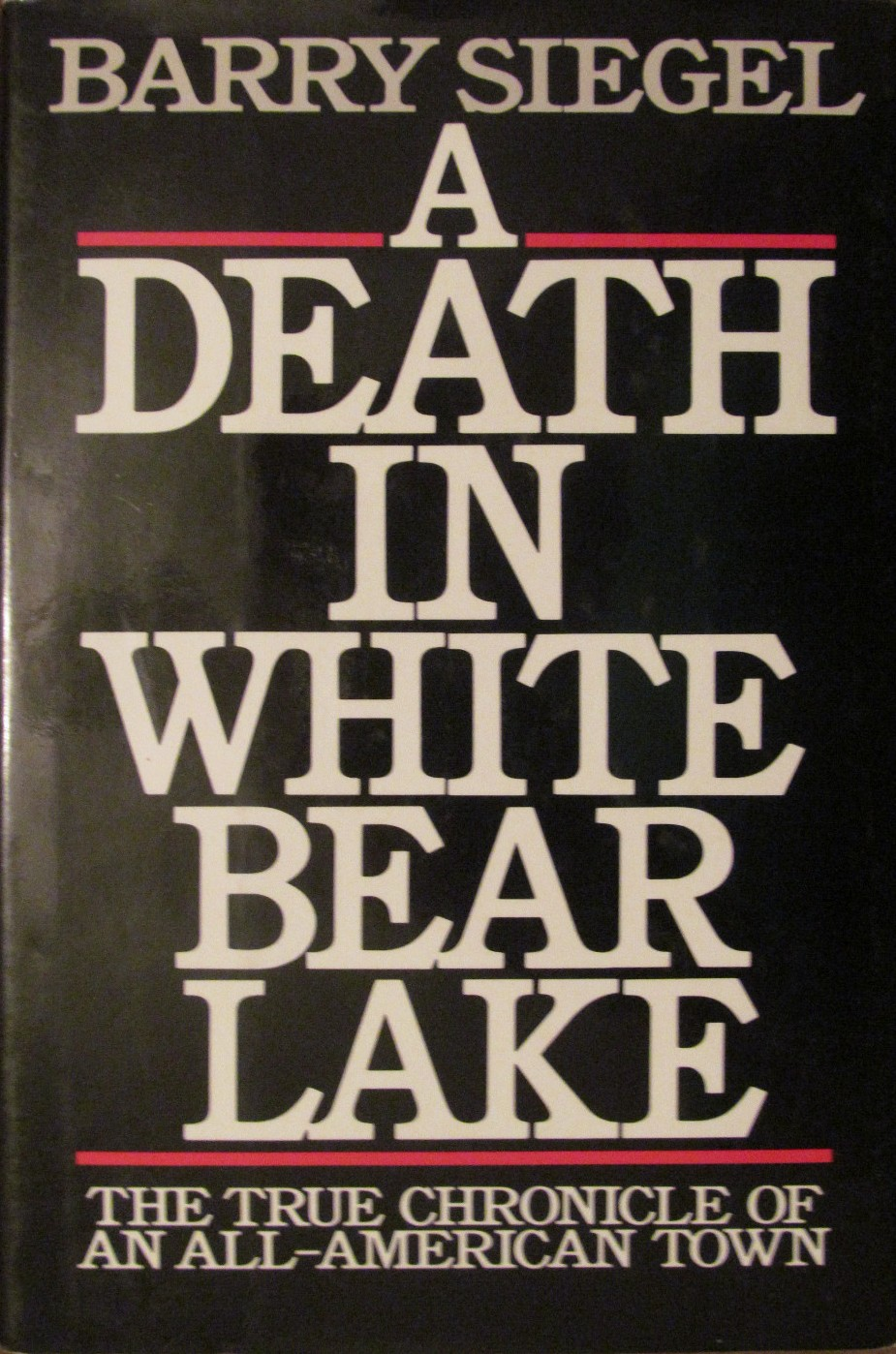
- First hardcover edition
- Author: Barry Siegel
- Language: English
- Subject: Crime, history
- Genre: Non-fiction
- Publication date: 1990
- Publication place: United States

A Death in White Bear Lake is a true crime book by journalist Barry Siegel, published in 1990, which recounts the murder of Dennis Jurgens.

== Summary ==
Dennis Jurgens was born in 1961 to teen girl Jerry Sherwood, herself a ward of the state. She was pressured to give up the boy for adoption at the age of six months. The boy was adopted by Harold and Lois Jurgens, who had already adopted one child. Sherwood went on to marry the boy's father and have four more children with him.

Dennis was treated for suspicious burns in 1963, which Lois claimed had an accidental cause. Dennis was found dead in his adopted parents home in White Bear Lake, Minnesota, on April 11, 1965. He was three and a half years old. When questioned about his death the Jurgens' claimed he'd fallen down a staircase. The cause of death was listed as undetermined. In 1975 four children were removed from the Jurgens home after abuse allegations from two of the children

Starting in 1980 Jerry Sherwood sought information about Dennis, and was deeply disturbed by the circumstances of his death. She pressured authorities to reexamine the case, leading the county medical examiner changing the manner of death to homicide after a severe beating.

Lois was charged with murder. Her defense attorney claimed she was mentally ill and should be sentenced to a psychiatric facility rather than prison. Prosecutors called a range of witnesses who attested Lois had inflicted such intense and varied abuse against Dennis that her conduct amounted to constant torture. Dr Thomas Votel, who performed the first autopsy on Dennis in 1965 testified that he believed Dennis was a battered child. He marked the death as "deferred", as he'd been told that the White Bear Lake police were investigating the death and he was awaiting additional information. She was found guilty of third-degree murder, and sentenced to a maximum of 25 years.

Siegel worked for the Los Angeles Times as a journalist, with his focus being national news. His research on the Dennis Jurgens case included historic documents and interviews hundreds of people.

== Reception ==
Attorney Andrew Vachss, an activist against child abuse, reviewed A Death in White Bear Lake for The New York Times. He stated the interviewees "speak more eloquently than any commentary." Vachss called it "fascinating, exhaustively documented", "a work of genuine journalism", and "a work of compelling narrative force and enduring value." Vachss argued his preference for the narrative format focusing on known facts over the true crime "novelizations, where scenes and conversations are simply made up." Vachss described the index as being useful for helping the reader with managing knowledge of the various people appearing in the book, describing it as "a professional touch". Vachss stated that the book does not explain the rationale for Harold being passive against Lois's actions, while it has sufficient information on Lois Jurgens.

George Johnson, in the same publication, designated the book as one of several "New & Noteworthy" books.

Carolyn Banks of The Washington Post called it "a distinguished entry in the annals of crime documentary."

Kirkus Reviews wrote that the author "doesn't spare the reader" in regards to details about events, stating that they are "ugly, horrible detail, thus even more emphatically indicting a society that looks the other way."
