= Mark Tucker (offensive lineman) =

American football player and coach (born 1968)

No. 51, 71, 56
- Positions: Guard, center

Personal information
- Born: April 29, 1968 (age 58); Spokane, Washington, U.S.
- Listed height: 6 ft 3 in (1.91 m)
- Listed weight: 295 lb (134 kg)

Career information
- High school: Phineas Banning (Los Angeles, California)
- College: USC
- NFL draft: 1991: 7th round, 186th overall pick
- Expansion draft: 1995: 8th round, 15th overall pick

Career history

Playing
- Atlanta Falcons (1991)*; Indianapolis Colts (1991–1992)*; Phoenix/Arizona Cardinals (1993–1994); Jacksonville Jaguars (1995)*; New Orleans Saints (1996)*; Arizona Rattlers (1997–2006)
- * Offseason or practice squad member only

Coaching
- Los Angeles Avengers (2008) Offensive line coach & fullbacks coach

Awards and highlights
- ArenaBowl champion (1997); Third-team All-American (1990); 2× First-team All-Pac-10 (1988, 1990); Second Team All-Pac 10 (1989)

Career NFL statistics
- Games played: 16
- Games started: 3
- Stats at Pro Football Reference

Career AFL statistics
- Tackles: 36
- Sacks: 1.5
- Forced fumbles: 2
- Stats at ArenaFan.com

Mark Tucker (born April 29, 1968) is an American former professional football player who was an offensive lineman in the National Football League (NFL). He played college football for the USC Trojans.

== Early life ==
Tucker played football at Banning High School in Wilmington, California. He started at offensive tackle his junior and senior year. He was teammates with Jamelle Holieway, Leroy Holt, and Courtney Hall (Rice University). Tucker and Hall were the best offensive tackle tandem in the Marine League that year, with Tucker being only a junior. Tucker was named to the All State Underclass team as a junior. Was named to the Daily Breeze All Star 1st team as a junior and senior. He was the South Bay Lineman of the year as a senior (1986). The Pilots had a talented I-veer running attack with Holieway (Oklahoma) at quarterback, Holt (USC) at fullback and Bret Young (Oregon) at the I-Back Brett getting 611 yards in a single game, a Banning High School record with each gaining 1,000 yards rushing in 1984 as they reached the finals at the Los Angeles Memorial Coliseum only to fall to rival Carson 33-20 finishing as the runner up with a 10-2 record.

His senior year (1985) the Pilots struggled early with a tough non-conference schedule that included powerhouse Long Beach Poly but put together a solid campaign to finish the regular season 6-3 and advanced to the LA City 4A playoffs. With victories over Kennedy and San Fernando, the Pilots assured themselves of a rematch with the Carson Colts in the 1985 title tilt. Banning uncharacteristically took to the air, catching Carson off guard they pulled off a dramatic and dominating performance winning 31-7 to recapture the LA City title, the 8th in Banning Highs history.

== College career ==
Tucker played at the University of Southern California and graduated in 1991 with a Bachelor's degree in political science. A four-year starter at offensive guard, he won the job three games into his freshman season. He started 48 games in his career. He was All Pac-10 as a sophomore and senior, second-team as a junior, and first-team All-American as a senior. He was a finalist for the Lombardi Award and Outland Trophy given to the top lineman in college football. USC was 35-12-2 in his career, finishing 18th in the Associated Press in 1987, 7th in 1988, 8th in 1989 and 20th in 1990. Started the 1988, 1989 and 1990 Rose Bowl games. Finished his career in the Hancock Sun Bowl in 1990 as well losing to Michigan State 17-16. Played in the Hula Bowl All Star game in Hawaii.

== Professional career ==
=== NFL career ===
Tucker was selected in the seventh round by the Atlanta Falcons in the 1991 NFL draft with the 186th overall pick. He spent most of the season on the Indianapolis Colts practice squad that year. He re-signed the next year and was allocated to the now defunct World League of American Football where he played for the Frankfurt Galaxy. In 1993, he signed with the Phoenix/Arizona Cardinals and was there for two seasons. In early 1995 he was selected by the Jacksonville Jaguars in the 1995 NFL expansion draft. He signed with the New Orleans Saints in 1996.

=== AFL career ===
He left the NFL in 1997 and became a member of the Arizona Rattlers of the Arena Football League. He would go on to a long career with the Rattlers, one that would span a decade. The Rattlers enjoyed many successes and failures during his tenure, from an Arena Bowl victory over a Kurt Warner led Iowa Barnstormer team in ArenaBowl XI to the loses in consecutive ArenaBowls XVI, XVII, XVIII. Upon retirement after the 2006 season Tucker became the offensive/defensive line coach for the Rattlers. He also held that capacity with the 2010 Az Rattlers and then with the New Orleans Voodoo in 2011.

=== Other ===
From 1993-94 Tucker appeared on a few episodes in season 5 of American Gladiators under the Gladiator name Rebel. These appearances were as an alternate for injured Gladiators.

In 1998 Tucker began a coaching career that has spanned 23 years at Hamilton High School in Chandler, Arizona. He has produced several D1 lineman, most notably Christian Westerman (Auburn/ASU), Casey Tucker (Stanford), Tyler Johnstone (Oregon), Austin Brantley (Undecided). The program has won 7 6A State Titles in his tenure.

In July 2012 at 44 yrs of age Tucker joined the Phoenix Fire Department. In December 2020 he was promoted to Engineer and currently is on Engine 58 “C” Shift.
