= Smarte Carte =

Coordinates: 45°4′26″N 93°3′5″W

Smarte Carte Inc.
- Industry: Travel & Leisure
- Founded: 1967
- Founder: Jim Muellner
- Headquarters: White Bear Lake, Minnesota
- Area served: Worldwide
- Products: Luggage carts Wheelchairs; Lockers; Commercial strollers Massage chairs Happy Or Not
- Services: Baggage storage Lost property Porter service Baggage wrap Mail N' Fly
- Number of employees: 2,000
- Website: www.smartecarte.com

Smarte Carte Inc. (stylized as smartecarte) is a global company based in White Bear Lake, Minnesota focused on providing products and services to the travel and leisure industries. Smarte Carte specializes in luggage carts and trolleys, wheelchairs, electronic lockers, commercial strollers, and massage chairs, as well as airport services such as baggage storage, baggage wrap, lost property, Mail N’ Fly, porter services, and more.

Operating in more than 3,500 locations around the world, its products and services are primarily found in airports, shopping centers, theme and water parks, ski resorts, and fitness centers.

The company is owned by 3I, an investment firm based in London, England, that focuses on mid-market private equity and infrastructure.

== Origin & history ==
In 1967, Jim Muellner was commissioned to design and build one of the first self-serve luggage cart vending machines. In Salt Lake City International Airport, Minneapolis/St. Paul International Airport, and Los Angeles International Airport saw the launch of Smarte Carte Inc.'s initial activities. They moved into foreign markets in the 1980s and have maintained market leadership in other vending equipment and airport baggage carts through long-term customer contracts. In 1992, the company recognized the increasing concern with security at airports and formed Smarte Carte Inc. to develop and grow the locker business. The company extends operations into shopping malls across the country. In February 2005, Smarte Carte filed for Chapter 11 bankruptcy protection. In 2008, with the purchase of First Class Seats and Sit Back & Relax, they entered the massage chair business, making them the largest provider of vending massage chair services in the United States. They expanded their business further in 2018 by purchasing Aviation Mobility and entering the wheelchair market.

== Headquarters ==
Smarte Carte’s corporate and North American headquarters are located in White Bear Lake, Minnesota, United States. Additional regional headquarters are located in Australia and the United Kingdom.

== Operations ==
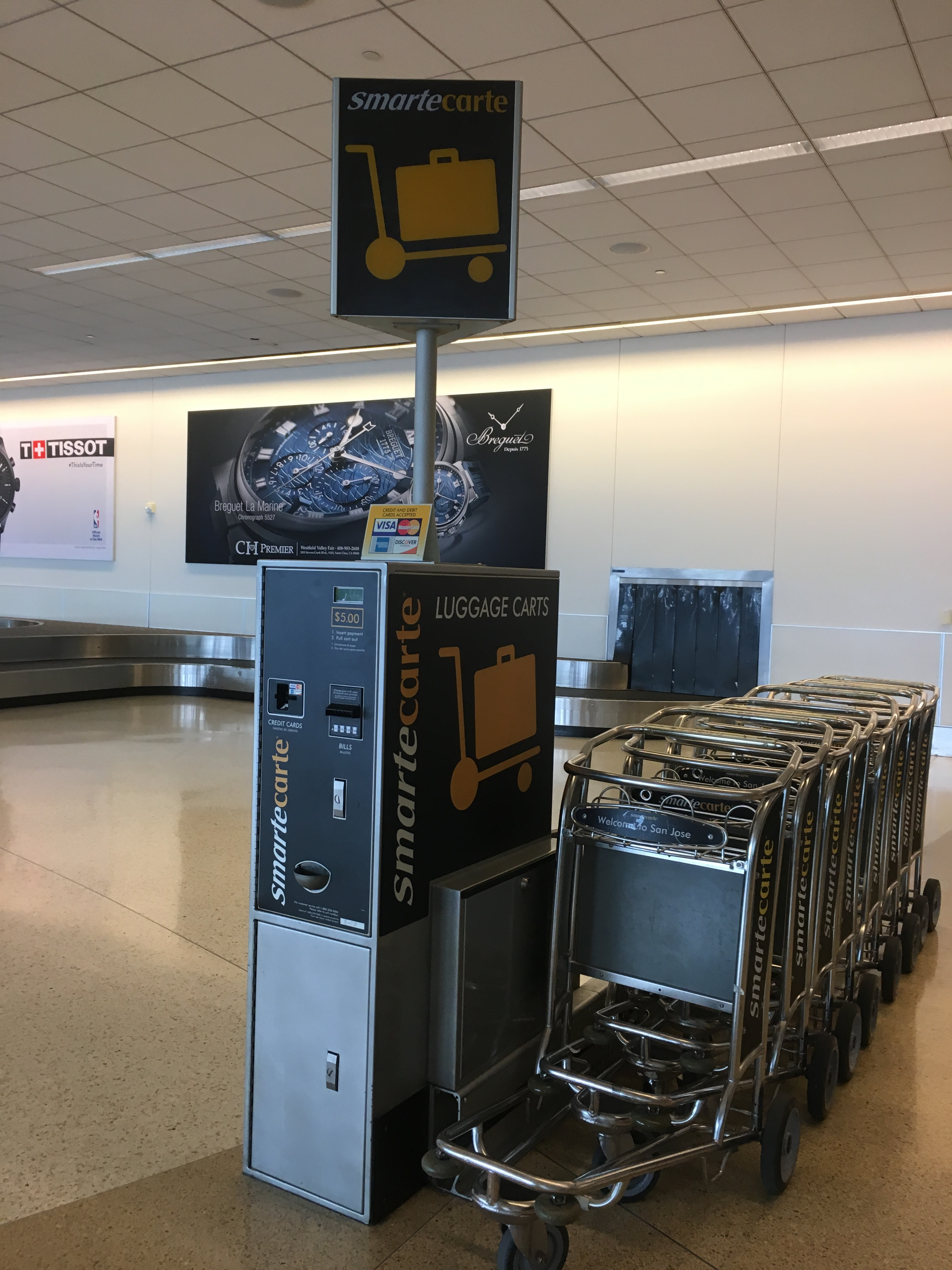
A Smarte Carte luggage cart stand at San Jose International Airport

Smarte Carte Inc. operates products and services in the United States, Canada, United Kingdom, Sweden, Australia, New Zealand, and Singapore.

== Products and services ==
• Luggage carts and operations at airports and major bus/rail stations.
• Mobility products, including Strollers, ECVs, and Wheelchairs at airports, amusement parks, zoos, and shopping centers.
• Long-term baggage storage, baggage wrapping, lost property, porter, meet and greet, and Mail N’ Fly and other services at airports and major bus/rail stations.
• Electronic lockers and operations at amusement/theme parks, indoor and outdoor water parks, trampoline parks, ski resorts, entertainment centers, shopping centers, zoos, and transportation centers.
• Massage chairs at airports, malls, gyms, transportation centers, and family entertainment centers.

== Acquisitions ==
Smarte Carte has acquired several companies over the course of its history, including Sit Back & Relax and First Class Seats in 2008 (massage chairs), Central Specialties LTD in 2012 (strollers), Bagport in 2016 (carts and services), Aviation Mobility in 2018 (wheelchairs), and Feel Good Chairs (massage chairs) in 2019.
