= Charles P. Noyes Cottage =

Historic house in Minnesota, United States

- U.S. National Register of Historic Places
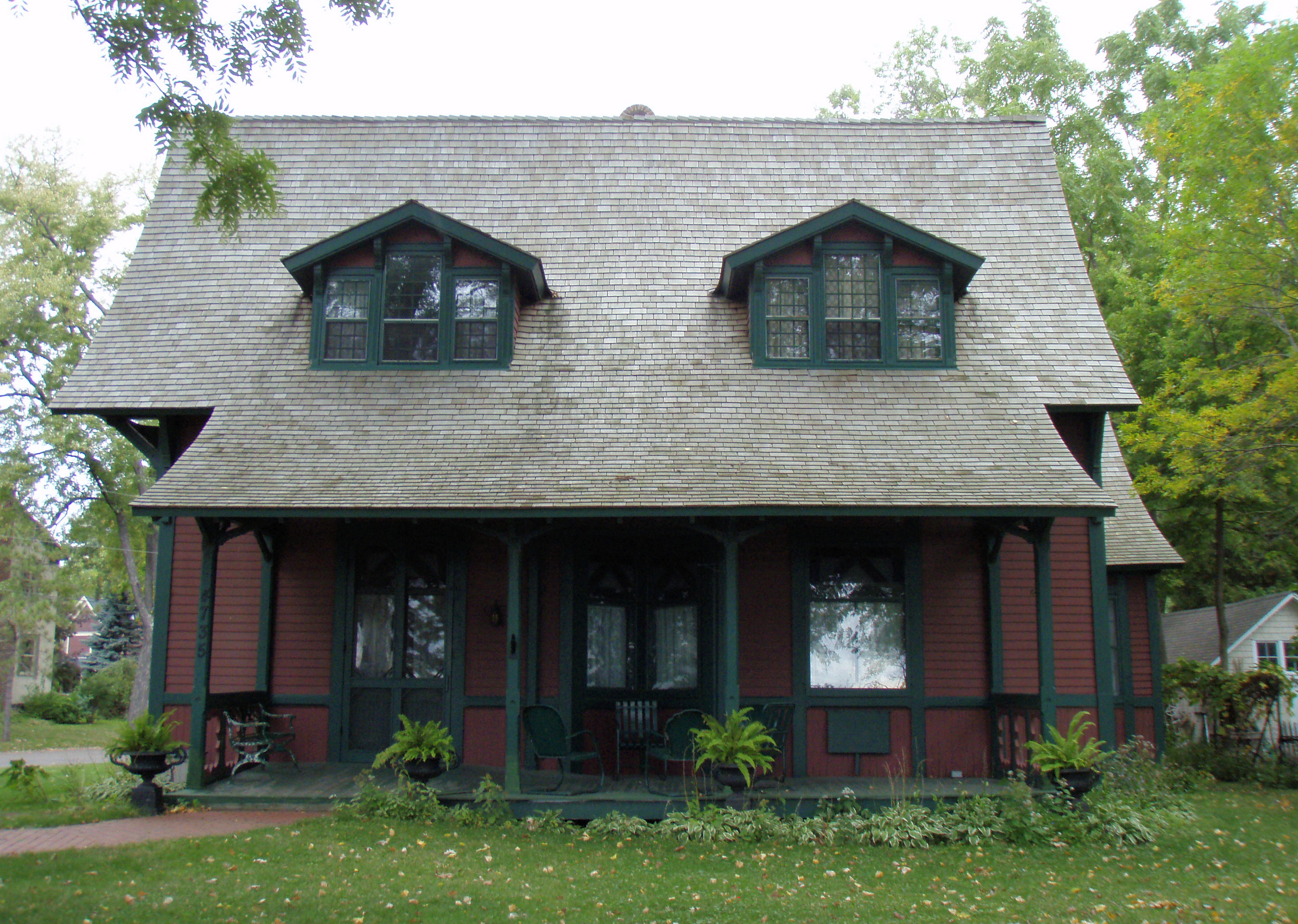
- The front of the house facing White Bear Lake

- Location within Minnesota Location within the United States
- Location: 4735 Lake Avenue; White Bear Lake, Minnesota
- Coordinates: 45°5′6″N 93°0′11″W
- Built: 1879
- Architectural style: Stick/Eastlake
- NRHP reference No.: 76001070
- Added to NRHP: December 12, 1976

The Charles P. Noyes Cottage (also known as the Fillebrown House) was a summer home of Saint Paul pharmacist, Charles P. Noyes, who came to St. Paul in 1868. The cottage is listed on the National Register of Historic Places.

== Description and history ==
A sign outside the cottage cites it as being a rare example of American Picturesque architecture, dating back to the late 19th century when White Bear Lake was a resort town with large colonnaded hotels and fine summer homes along the lake.

The house was owned by the Fillebrown family for most of its years as a residence, and was donated to the White Bear Lake Area Historical Society in 1978. The house is open for tours and special events.
