= Kevin M. Chandler =

American lawyer

Kevin M. Chandler (born March 31, 1960) was an American lawyer and politician.

Chandler lived with his wife and family in White Bear Lake, Minnesota. He received his bachelor's degree at University of Minnesota and his Juris Doctor degree at Columbus School of Law at The Catholic University of America in Washington, D.C. He was admitted to the Minnesota bar. Chandler served in the Minnesota Senate from 1993 to 1997 and was a Democrat.
