= Maurice D. McCollar =

American politician (1935–2008)

Morris D. McCollar (June 3, 1935 – January 12, 2008) was an American chiropractor and politician.

McCollar graduated from Morris High School in Morris, Minnesota. He served in the United States Navy and was an aviator. He went to the University of Minnesota and graduated from Logan University (formerly Lagan College of Chiropractic) and did his internship in St. Louis, Missouri. McCollar lived in White Bear Lake, Minnesota with his wife and family and was a chiropractor. He served on the Minnesota Board of Health and on the Minnesota Public Utilities Commission. McCollar also served on the White Bear Lake Board of Education and was a Democrat. He served in the Minnesota House of Representatives from 1975 to 1978. McCollar died at his home in Little Canada, Minnesota.
