= Ron Settles =

American football player (1959–1981)

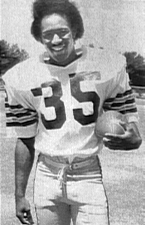

No. 35
- Position: Running back

Personal information
- Born: June 12, 1959; Los Angeles, California
- Died: June 2, 1981 (aged 21); Signal Hill, California

Career information
- High school: Los Angeles (CA) Banning
- College: Long Beach State (1977−1980)

Ron Settles (June 12, 1959 – June 2, 1981) was a California State University, Long Beach and Banning High School football player who was arrested by the Signal Hill Police Department in 1981 then died while in police custody.

The morning after his arrest, Settles was found severely beaten. Police officers claimed they found Settles hanging in his jail cell from a noose created from a mattress cover, from which they cut him down. However, police elected not to take photographic evidence of the hanging and instead only took pictures of Settles on the floor. Also officers refused to testify—pleading the fifth, in what continues to appear to some to have been a conspiratorial 'smokescreen' or cover-up of police brutality. In 1981, a jury in a Los Angeles coroner's inquest ruled that Settles had died 'at the hands of another, other than by accident'.

A furor erupted afterwards about the nature of his death, as the police said the death was a suicide. No one was prosecuted for Settles' death, but the City of Signal Hill did pay a $1 million settlement to the family.

The case had long-term impacts on the reputation of Signal Hill, although a new police chief took steps to reform the police department. The case was an early high-profile case handled by attorney Johnnie Cochran, who represented the family; one of the policemen implicated in the incident was also represented by another noted civil rights attorney, Stephen Yagman.

Settles’ death was one of several highly controversial deaths of arrestees in the 1970s and 1980s that changed the way police departments deal with prisoners. Many of them now videotape jail areas and any time a police officer or correction officer touches a prisoner in a restraining way, a report is required to be written. These measures are intended to decrease the chances of police brutality in prison cells.

Settles' story was told by Dr. Michael Baden on HBO's series Autopsy. Charles Burnett's 1995 film The Glass Shield was based, in part, on the Settles case.

== See also ==
- List of gridiron football players who died during their careers
