= White Bear Lake Area High School =

Location
- White Bear Lake, Minnesota 55110; United States; 45°5′38″N 93°0′53.4″W

Information
- Type: Public
- Motto: Strive for Excellence
- Established: 1983 (previously White Bear High School, White Bear Mariner High School, then North Campus and South Campus)
- School district: White Bear Lake Area Schools
- Superintendent: Wayne Kazmierczak
- Principal: Russ Reetz
- Enrollment: 2500 (estimated)
- Colors: Orange, Black, and White
- Mascot: White Bear
- Rival: Hill-Murray School, all SEC schools
- Website: White Bear Lake Area High School

White Bear Lake Area High School (abbreviated WBLAHS) is a high school in White Bear Lake, Minnesota, United States. The school was formed by merging White Bear High School (WBHS) and White Bear Mariner High School in the 1983–84 school year. It currently consists of one campus and an alternative learning center. While WBLAHS was once the only school in the state of Minnesota with grades 9–10 and 11–12 in different buildings, the two buildings unified at the current North Campus site after a 396,000 square foot addition was completed for the fall 2024 opening.

For the academic years of 2019-2020, 2020-2021 and 2021-2022, White Bear Lake Area High School ranked 4543rd in the nation and 75th in Minnesota High Schools. The school district ranks 3,616th nationally and 49th within the state for their graduation rate.

== Current and Former Campuses ==
=== White Bear Lake Area High School ===
North Campus, the previous White Bear High School, then known as North Campus, is located in the north side of White Bear Lake, northwest of downtown White Bear Lake, and was built in 1964. For forty years, the school housed students in grades 9–10, but as of the fall of 2024, houses students in grades 9-12. The campus features some unique architectural design elements, including circular hallways and learning studios.

=== South Campus ===
What was once known as South Campus was built in 1971 and opened late in the Summer of '72 as White Bear Mariner High School. In contrast to North Campus, South's floor plan was originally open, consisting of only minimal walls between classrooms. In 1983, upon merging with White Bear High School, the building was remodeled to hold grades eleven and twelve, and a more traditional design was achieved by adding interior walls throughout. The building has since been expanded multiple times. In the early 1990s ten classrooms were added in the southeast corner of the building. A weight room and fitness center was added in 2005. The Mariner Theater stage was renovated in 2010, converting the space from a lecture hall/small stage theater to an acoustic venue.

The former South Campus building houses a self-contained secondary special education school, operated and owned by Intermediate District 916 North East Metro School District. This facility was renovated in 2009.

In 2021, the Building our Future bond referendum called for two phases of expansion to the South Campus and future repurposing of the site to become the new location of Sunrise Park Middle School. The first phase expansion provided for the construction of a gymnasium on the northwest corner. Phase two provided for a classroom addition on the east side of the building and moved the main entrance from the south side of the building to its east side, facing McKnight Road.

In 2023, a school naming committee was formed to rename the building to be effective when the former Sunrise Park Middle School moved into the former South Campus building in the fall of 2024. At the February 13, 2023 School Board regular meeting, the White Bear Lake Area School Board approved the committee's recommendation to change the name of the former Sunrise Park Middle School. The new name, Mariner Middle School, is a nod to the District’s past.

=== Area Learning Center ===
Housed in the former Golfview Elementary, a few blocks away from Mariner Middle School, is White Bear Lake's alternative secondary program. This school houses secondary students in grades 10–12 who are unable to participate in a traditional high school environment, including those who are not achieving to their potential, are parents, or have a day job. The building also contains the Insight program, a curriculum designed for students recovering from drug abuse and addictions.

=== Merger ===
On November 9, 2019, with a 57.4 positive vote, voters in the White Bear Lake School District approved a plan to provide renovations and construction to make changes to facilities in the district. The project included expanding the former North Campus to become the district's only high school. The former South Campus was repurposed as a middle school, as Sunrise Park Middle School relocated and opened in 2024 as Mariner Middle School. Construction for this merger was completed for the opening of the 2024–25 school year.

== Curriculum ==
Through the Minnesota state Post Secondary Enrollment Options (PSEO) program, students are eligible to take classes at state colleges and universities.

== Athletics ==
=== Basketball ===
White Bear Lake High School won the Boys' Basketball State Championship in 1984 & 1985, with an undefeated record of 52-0. The head coach was Jim Galvin. WBL also made it to state in 1995, after defeating Mounds View in a thrilling 3-overtime game during the Section Championship, 80-78. They went on to lose in the 1st round to eventual State Champion Minneapolis North, who was led by Khalid El-Amin. WBL also made State Tournament appearances in 2000, and most recently 2023, losing to eventual State Champion Wayzata in the 1st round. The '23 group did go on to win the Consolation Championship.

=== Football ===
White Bear High School won the Minnesota State Class AA Football Championship in 1976. The team posted a 12–0 record and finished the season with a 14–13 overtime win over Cloquet. The team held opponents to an average of less than one touchdown per game. As the only undefeated large school class (AA) football team in Minnesota, the 1976 Bears received a ranking of No. 17th in the nation.

=== Lacrosse ===
The 2007 boys Lacrosse team won the MBSLA State Championship with an undefeated season going 15–0. The Bears outscored their opponents with a 199 to 46 goal differential. 2007 was the first year that the Minnesota State High School League recognized Lacrosse as a state sanctioned sport leaving it up to the individual school districts to determine whether or not it was feasible to enter the MSHSL. Prior to the 2007 year each high school team played in the Minnesota Boys Scholastic Lacrosse Association (MBSLA), White Bear Lake Area H.S. officials cited budgetary issues as the reason for waiting to officially join the MSHSL in 2008. The Bears officially entered the MBSLA for competition in 2005. The Bears went to the MSHsL State semi-finals in 2013. The Bears went on to win the 2015 MSHSL State Championship.

=== Archery ===
The White Bear Lake Archery team won the state tournament for Minnesota in 2006, 2007, 2008, 2009, and 2010.

The White Bear Lake Archery team has competed in the National tournament held in Kentucky since 2004. The team ranked 40th of 192 high school teams in 2015.

=== Bowling ===
The White Bear Lake Bowling Team won the state title in 2005. White Bear Lake also posted a state championship in 2008. It had two top 6 athletes in the state in 2009.

=== Wrestling ===
The White Bear Lake High School wrestling team finished in 7th overall at the 2007 ASICS/ USA Wrestling Folkstyle National Championship. Donny Longendyke won the School Boy category.

=== Other athletics offered ===
Fall	Winter	Spring
Adapted Soccer	Adapted Floor Hockey	Adapted Softball
Cross Country	Alpine Ski	Baseball
Soccer	Basketball	Golf
Swim and Dive	Gymnastics	Softball
Tennis	Hockey	Tennis
Volleyball	Nordic Ski	Track and Field
Football	Swim and Dive	Lacrosse
	Wrestling	

== Other activities ==
=== FIRST Robotics ===
The White Bear Lake FIRST robotics team #2207, the Bright Bears, was added as a school activity during the 2007 school year. Every year the team builds a single robot to compete in the FIRST Robotics Competition hosted at the University of Minnesota. At the 2017 North Star Regional, in Mariucci Arena, University of Minnesota, the team was ranked 35 out of 60 teams competing, with 4 wins, and 4 losses.

=== Drumline ===
The White Bear Lake Drumline took part in the 2018 Super Bowl parade held at U.S. Bank Stadium for Super Bowl LII. They also regularly participate and perform in the local festival Marketfest along with the pep band. The school does not have a marching band program, however the Drumline does march in some summer parades along with the pep band.

=== Theater ===
The program involves White Bear Lake High School students of all grades in musicals and plays. In recent years, White Bear Lake has featured such musicals as Legally Blonde, Little Shop of Horrors, Chicago, Into the Woods, Grease, Oklahoma!, Beauty and the Beast, Urinetown, West Side Story, and How to Succeed in Business Without Really Trying, Addams Family, Nice Work If You Can Get It, and Mary Poppins. They have also produced plays such as Clue, The Play That Goes Wrong, Much Ado About Nothing, Twelve Angry Men, and Treasure Island.

== Sister schools ==
Hangzhou Foreign Language School

== Alumni ==
- Ami Wazlawik - Member of the Minnesota House of Representatives
- John Kriesel - Motivational speaker, radio personality and former member of the Minnesota House of Representatives
- Paul M Nakasone - Four-star general, Commander of United States Cyber Command, Director of the National Security Agency, and Chief of the Central Security Service
- Michael Djupstrom - acclaimed pianist and composer
- King K. Holmes - world leader in AIDS and infectious disease research
- John A. Cassada - NASA Astronaut

=== Athletes ===
- Jim Brunzell (University of Minnesota and AWA and WWE)
- Bill Butters (University of Minnesota and NHL)
- Justin Braun (UMass and NHL)
- Brian Bonin (1996 Hobey Baker Award winner and 1992 Minnesota Mr. Hockey award winner)
- Tony Benshoof (Olympic luge)
- Matt Henderson (University of North Dakota and NHL)
- Ryan Carter (Minnesota State University, Mankato and NHL 2007 Stanley Cup winner)
- Jeff Parker (WB Mariner '83) Michigan State University and NHL.
- Joel Reichow, distance runner
- Rick Danmeier, Minnesota Vikings, NFL placekicker
