= Fred Matua =

American football player (1984–2012)

No. 67, 53
- Position: Guard

Personal information
- Born: January 14, 1984; Wilmington, California, U.S.
- Died: August 5, 2012 (aged 28)
- Listed height: 6 ft 2 in (1.88 m)
- Listed weight: 310 lb (141 kg)

Career information
- High school: Banning (Wilmington)
- College: Southern California
- NFL draft: 2006: 7th round, 217th overall pick

Career history
- Detroit Lions (2006)*; Tennessee Titans (2006)*; Cleveland Browns (2006); Tennessee Titans (2007)*; Washington Redskins (2008)*; Florida Tuskers (2009); Omaha Nighthawks (2010)*; Florida Tuskers (2010)
- * Offseason or practice squad member only

Awards and highlights
- Second-team All-Pac-10 (2005)

Fred Matua (January 14, 1984 – August 5, 2012) was an American football guard. After playing college football for Southern California, he was selected by the Detroit Lions in the seventh round of the 2006 NFL draft. He was also a member of the Lions, Tennessee Titans, Cleveland Browns, Washington Redskins, Florida Tuskers, and Omaha Nighthawks.

== Early life ==
Born in Wilmington, California, Matua prepped at Banning High School in Wilmington, California where he won the 2000 LA City 4A Championship his junior year.

== College career ==
While playing college football for the USC Trojans, Matua was an All-American guard in 2005.

== Professional career ==
Pre-draft measurables
Height	Weight	Arm length	Hand span	40-yard dash	20-yard shuttle	Three-cone drill	Vertical jump	Broad jump	Bench press
6 ft 2 3/8 in (1.89 m)	306 lb (139 kg)	31 5/8 in (0.80 m)	9 7/8 in (0.25 m)	5.00 s	4.76 s	7.87 s	31.0 in (0.79 m)	8 ft 7 in (2.62 m)	28 reps
All values from NFL Combine/Pro Day

Matua was selected on the second day by the National Football League's Detroit Lions but was cut by the team and was signed to the Tennessee Titans practice squad. On October 28, 2006, he was signed to the Cleveland Browns roster.

Matua was signed by the Florida Tuskers of the United Football League on September 3, 2009.

== Death ==
On August 5, 2012, Matua died at the age of 28 of a heart-related issue.
