= Lois Jurgens =

American murderer (1925–2013)

Lois Germaine Josephine Zerwas Jurgens
- Born: August 12, 1925; Saint Paul, Minnesota, U.S.
- Died: May 7, 2013 (aged 87); Stillwater, Minnesota, U.S.
- Known for: Conviction in the death of 3-year-old Dennis Jurgens
- Criminal charge: Convicted of third-degree murder
- Criminal penalty: Maximum of 25 years in prison (paroled in 1995)
- Criminal status: Deceased
- Spouse: Harold Jurgens
- Children: Adoptive mother of six children

Lois Germaine Josephine Zerwas Jurgens (August 12, 1925 – May 7, 2013) was an American convicted murderer responsible for one of the most unusual child murder cases in history in Minnesota. She was the adoptive mother of six children in the 1960s and 1970s, and brutally abused them all, killing one of them, 3-year-old Dennis Jurgens, in 1965.

== Biography ==
Jurgens was one of 16 children. Her brother, Jerome Zerwas, was the police lieutenant of the town of White Bear Lake, Minnesota, where she lived at the time. There was testimony from other officers that he impeded the investigation into the child's death. No prosecution was taken at that time.

== Case details ==
In the early 1980s, Dennis' birth mother, Jerry Sherwood, looked for Dennis, only to find out he had died in 1965. After seeing newspaper reports about the death, she was convinced that he had been beaten to death and demanded the case be re-opened. In 1987, Jurgens was convicted of third-degree murder of Dennis. She was sentenced to a maximum of 25 years in prison and was paroled in 1995. The case is described in detail in Barry Siegel's true-crime novel, A Death in White Bear Lake. There was a television movie broadcast in 1992 on NBC entitled A Child Lost Forever that told the story from the perspective of Jerry Sherwood (played by Beverly D'Angelo). In 2005, playwright Brian Vinero wrote a theatre piece, The Jurgens File, which was developed at New York City's 78th Street Theatre Lab; it told the story from the perspective of the community.

On January 13, 2000, she was initially suspected of poisoning her husband, Harold. However, he was in failing health and his autopsy results did not indicate poisoning. There was also talk years earlier of her having started the fire at her in-laws' home which killed her mother-in-law, with whom she never got along.

Lois Jurgens served eight years of her sentence and had a quiet life as a widow in Stillwater, Minnesota. She died aged 87 on May 7, 2013. She is buried at the Union Cemetery, in Maplewood, Ramsey County, Minnesota.
