= Thomas Warren Newcome =

American politician (1923–2011)

Thomas Warren Newcome II (August 18, 1923 – February 7, 2011) was an American lawyer and politician.

Newcome was born in Saint Paul, Minnesota and graduated from Saint Thomas Academy in Mendota Heights, Minnesota. He served in the United States Army during World War II and the Korean War. Newcome graduated from the University of Minnesota and St. Paul College of Law (now William Mitchell College of Law). He lived in White Bear Lake, Minnesota with his wife and family and practiced law. Newcome served as Mayor of White Bear Lake from 1961 to 1963 and on the Mahtomedi, Minnesota School Board. He also served as White Bear Lake Municipal Court judge and city attorney. Newcome served in the Minnesota House of Representatives from 1965 to 1974. He died at his home in White Bear Lake, Minnesota.
