= Bob Whitfield =

American football player (born 1971)

No. 70, 71
- Position: Offensive tackle

Personal information
- Born: October 18, 1971 (age 55); Carson, California, U.S.
- Listed height: 6 ft 5 in (1.96 m)
- Listed weight: 318 lb (144 kg)

Career information
- High school: Banning (Los Angeles, California)
- College: Stanford
- NFL draft: 1992: 1st round, 8th overall pick

Career history
- Atlanta Falcons (1992–2003); Jacksonville Jaguars (2004); New York Giants (2005–2006)

Awards and highlights
- Pro Bowl (1998); Consensus All-American (1991); 2× First-team All-Pac-10 (1990, 1991); Second Team All-Pac 10 (1989)

Career NFL statistics
- Games played: 220
- Games started: 176
- Fumble recoveries: 5
- Stats at Pro Football Reference

Bob Lectress Whitfield III (born October 18, 1971) is an American former professional football player who was an offensive tackle in the National Football League (NFL). He played college football for the Stanford Cardinal.

== Early life ==
Whitfield played high school football at Banning High School in Wilmington, California, where he was teammates with Mark Tucker. He then played college football at Stanford University, where Dennis Green served as head coach. Whitfield won a starting position as a true freshman and following his junior season, he declared his eligibility in the NFL Draft.

== Professional career ==
Pre-draft measurables
Height	Weight	Arm length	Hand span	40-yard dash	10-yard split	20-yard split	20-yard shuttle	Vertical jump
6 ft 5 1/2 in (1.97 m)	295 lb (134 kg)	34 3/4 in (0.88 m)	9 1/8 in (0.23 m)	5.12 s	1.76 s	2.96 s	4.44 s	29.5 in (0.75 m)

Whitfield was drafted in the first round (eighth overall) of the 1992 NFL draft by the Atlanta Falcons. He played for the Falcons from 1992–2003 before he was released by the team. He then played for the Jacksonville Jaguars for the 2004 season. Whitfield, a 1999 Pro Bowler, was a fixture on the Falcons offensive line that finished 14-2 in the regular season. The team went on to upset the Minnesota Vikings in the NFC Championship Game and advance to Super Bowl XXXIII. Whitfield attended Stanford University, where he was a consensus All-America student-athlete in his junior season. Although he made an early draft departure, Bob returned to the university to complete a Bachelors Degree of Arts in Economics in 2012. He was inducted in the Stanford Sports Hall of Fame in 2012.

Whitfield started for the New York Giants at left tackle during the 2006 season filling in after starter Luke Petitgout went down with injury. His time as a starter was marked by two episodes of him losing his cool and drawing costly personal fouls, twice on headbutts in key spots against the Dallas Cowboys and later in a week 16 loss against the New Orleans Saints. These actions lead to him receiving the nickname "Head-butt Bob" from many Giant fans as well as local columnists. Due to these actions and general inconsistent play, Whitfield was benched for the final game of the season against the Washington Redskins and the subsequent playoff game against the Philadelphia Eagles.

On February 12, 2007, he announced his retirement on Sirius NFL radio.

== Post-playing career ==
Whitfield is the founder and C.E.O. of Patchwerks, Inc., established in 1993, which operated PatchWerk Recording Studios in Atlanta, GA. Offering recording, production, mixing and mastering services, the studio has recorded and/or mixed more than 500 gold and platinum albums, including portions of OutKast's ATLiens, and Goodie Mob's Still Standing. The studio has also worked with the likes of T.I., Nelly, 50 Cent, Snoop Dogg, Missy Elliott, Beyoncé, 112, Busta Rhymes, TLC, Whitney Houston, Young Jeezy, Toni Braxton, Sting, Cher, Madonna, Annie Lennox, and many more. The studio was divested from the parent company in 2009 in order to focus investment in film and television.

Whitfield also serves as a guest analyst for the UK's NFL Coverage on Sky Sports as well as contributing on local Atlanta television and radio.

On November 11, 2011, Whitfield was inducted into Stanford University's Hall of Fame and in an interview, Whitfield admitted he was considering a return to his alma mater to complete his degree. Whitfield returned to Stanford in 2012 and received a degree in economics during a commencement ceremony held Father's Day with his kids present.

Whitfield was married to The Real Housewives of Atlanta cast member Shereé Whitfield, with whom he has two children. The couple divorced in 2007. Shereé alleged that during their marriage Bob was abusive.

He has a son, Kodi, who also played football at Stanford.
