= Murder of Dennis Jurgens =

1965 crime in Minnesota

Dennis Jurgens
- Born: Dennis Craig Puckett; December 6, 1961; Sauk Centre, Minnesota, U.S.
- Died: April 11, 1965 (aged 3); White Bear Lake, Minnesota, U.S.
- Cause of death: Homicide by blunt force trauma
- Known for: Murder victim

Dennis Craig Jurgens (December 6, 1961 – April 11, 1965) was an American 3-year-old boy who was murdered in White Bear Lake, Minnesota in April 1965. Jurgens was the only fatal victim of Lois Jurgens, his adoptive mother and a prolific child abuser, who abused a total of six adopted children from 1960 to 1975. The trial of Lois Jurgens for the murder of 3-year-old Dennis made national headlines and was the top news story of the state of Minnesota in 1987.

== Early history ==
Dennis Jurgens was born Dennis Craig Puckett in Sauk Centre, Minnesota. He was the son of teenage Jerry Sherwood (who was herself a ward of the state) and her teenage boyfriend. At the time of Dennis' birth Sherwood was enrolled in a state reform school and said she had been pressured to put him up for adoption by her parole officer. Sherwood was told the baby would have a better life with a different mother and father. The final time she saw Dennis was at the Scott County Courthouse, when he was six months old. She was given a final fifteen minutes with Dennis before he was taken to his new home. After placing Dennis for adoption, Sherwood went on to marry the boy's father and have four more children with him.

== Murder and conviction ==
Dennis Jurgens was placed in the Jurgens' home in 1962, when he was 14 months old. He was the second child that the Jurgens' had adopted, and a case worker for the Ramsey County Welfare noted that Harold Jurgens seemed enthusiastic about adopting Dennis.

In August 1963, Dennis had to be hospitalized after suffering severe burns on his genitals, buttocks and lower abdomen. The doctor who treated him thought the burns were unusual, but Jurgens claimed it was an accident that had occurred when washing Dennis in the sink. She claimed he had turned on the hot water, causing the injury.

Dennis was found dead in his adopted parents home in White Bear Lake, on April 11, 1965. He was three and a half years old. When questioned about his death the Jurgens' claimed that he'd fallen down a staircase. The cause of death was listed as undetermined.

In 1975, four children adopted by the Jurgens were removed from their care. This was due to the two oldest children running away from home, and telling officials that they had been abused.

In 1980, Jerry Sherwood began searching for Dennis, only to discover he'd died. She was troubled by the cause of death and in 1986 asked the Ramsey County's Medical Examiner to reopen the case. They reviewed the original autopsy report, and declared that Dennis' cause of death was homicide and that he had been beaten to death.

The St. Paul Pioneer Press ran a cover story about the investigation on Sunday, October 12, 1986. Though the name of the adoptive family was not given, many suspected that the story was about Lois Jurgens. Sherwood's tenacity, along with the tragedy of her personal loss, kept the story in the public eye. Eventually Lois Jurgens was arraigned, and her identity released by the media.

In court, Jurgens' defense argued that she was mentally ill when Dennis had died and suggested psychiatric institutionalization instead of prison. The prosecution disagreed and claimed that a final beating by Lois Jurgens caused a fatal bowel injury that killed Dennis. Her defense argued that the injury was sustained due to a fall. Dennis' body was emaciated when he died and was covered in more than 50 bruises.

Lois Jurgens had been alone with the children for most of weekend that Dennis died, due to Harold being out of town doing electrical work for a friend. Lois called him late on Saturday, to tell him Dennis was sick, so Harold headed home. Harold later told a family friend that he took Dennis to bed, waking once to take Dennis to the toilet. He was unable to pass any stool, so they returned to bed. When Harold awoke, Dennis was dead. Robert, Dennis' older brother, testified in the trial that he had woken in the middle of the night and had heard Dennis and his father talking in the bathroom. He also recalled that Dennis had fallen down the basement stairs, landing on his stomach, around a week before his death. He said that his mother had run down the stairs after Dennis, and started to hit and shake him.

The prosecution argued that Jurgens' had beaten Dennis, and called upon relatives and neighbors who substantiated this claim. They had witnessed Dennis being burned, his head submerged under water, force-fed fecal matter, and his genitals tied with clothes pins. Dennis was so frequently bruised that he often was made to wear sunglasses to conceal his black eyes.

Dr Thomas Votel, who performed the first autopsy on Dennis in 1965 testified that he believed Dennis was a battered child. He marked the death as "deferred", as he'd been told that the White Bear Lake police were investigating the death. He claimed he was awaiting further information from the police before finalizing the cause of death.

Lois Jurgens was convicted of third-degree murder and sentenced to prison. The jury deliberated four and a half hours before returning with their decision. Lois Jurgens was sentenced to a maximum of 25 years, with her release date left to the discretion of the commissioner of correction.

The investigation, trial, and conviction are considered landmarks in the history of child abuse law.

== Aftermath ==
A Death in White Bear Lake is a true crime book by journalist Barry Siegel, published in 1990, which recounts the murder of Dennis Jurgens.

== In popular culture ==
- Barry Siegel's true crime book A Death in White Bear Lake details the murder of Dennis Jurgens.
- The 1992 NBC television film A Child Lost Forever told the story from the perspective of Jerry Sherwood (played by Beverly D'Angelo).
- A play, The Jurgens File, by Brian Vinero, examined the story from the perspective of the community.

== See also ==
- List of murdered American children

== Bibliography ==
- A Death in White Bear Lake by Barry Siegel. Published by Bantam Books, 1990.
- Star Tribune article "Jurgens Seeks Seclusion After Release From Prison," published June 7, 1995, Metro Section Page 1B.
- Various other articles from the Star Tribune running between May and June 1987, including "Jurgens Found Sane, Sent to Prison," "Brother Tells of Dennis Jurgens' Beatings," "Jurgens Trial Inspires Birth Mother's Mission" and "Jurgens Relatives Testify She Abused Adopted Son"
- Twin Cities Magazine article "A Mother's Love, Jerry Sherwood in Her Own Words" February 1988 edition.
- Los Angeles Times article "Child Murder: A Town Confronts Its Past," part of a series entitled "Death of a Child, Justice Delayed" by Barry Siegel.
- 60 Minutes piece "No One Saved Dennis" reported by Diane Sawyer, 1988.
