= Perry Klein =

American football player (born 1971)

No. 7
- Position: Quarterback

Personal information
- Born: March 25, 1971 (age 55); Santa Monica, California, U.S.
- Listed height: 6 ft 4 in (1.93 m)
- Listed weight: 218 lb (99 kg)

Career information
- High school: Palisades (Pacific Palisades); Carson (Carson, California)
- College: California; C.W. Post
- NFL draft: 1994: 4th round, 111th overall pick

Career history
- Atlanta Falcons (1994–1995)
- Stats at Pro Football Reference

Perry Sandor Klein (born March 25, 1971) is an American former professional football player who was a quarterback for the Atlanta Falcons of the National Football League (NFL). He played college football for the California Golden Bears and C.W. Post Pioneers.

In high school, he set the national record in pass completions in a game (46; in 49 attempts), and a California state record for most passing yards in a game, with 562. In his junior season, Klein set the California high school state record by throwing for more than 5,000 yards, and in his senior season of high school he was named California State Player of the Year. In his senior season of college, he played for C.W. Post, setting school single-season records by throwing for 3,757 yards and 38 touchdowns, and single-game records by throwing for 614 yards, 35 completions, and seven touchdowns in a single game, and was named the Division II Player of the Year. Klein was a fourth-round draft pick of the Atlanta Falcons in the 1994 NFL draft.

== Early life ==
Klein was born in Santa Monica, California, and is Jewish. His father is Danny Klein, a businessman in the scrap metal business, who played football in high school and was a single-wing tailback at Theodore Roosevelt High School in East LA.

He attended Malibu Park Junior High School. Klein was an All-America and All-City high school volleyball player.

Klein played football for the Palisades High School Dolphins. In a game against Jordan High School on November 20, 1987, he set the national record in pass completions in a game (46; in 49 attempts), and the school record in consecutive pass completions in a game (26). He also set a state record for most passing yards in a game, with 562. In his junior season, Klein set the California state record by throwing for more than 5,000 yards, and was Los Angeles All-City Player of the Year.

He then transferred to Carson High School for his senior season and helped the Colts win the 1988 City Section 4-A Division championship, as he was named California State Player of the Year, Parade Magazine High School All-America, and a Campbell Soup All-American. In high school Klein had a 72% pass completion record, averaging 10.7 yards per completion.

== College career ==
Klein received a scholarship and played college football at the University of California, Berkeley for the California Golden Bears in his first three years of college. He also attended Santa Monica College. Going into the 1993 season National Football League draft analyst Mel Kiper Jr. ranked Klein as the nation's fifth-best pro quarterback prospect.

He then transferred to the C.W. Post Campus of Long Island University. In his senior year with the Pioneers in 1993, he threw for 38 touchdowns. Klein was named the Division II Player of the Year, after throwing for an NCAA Division II record 614 yards passing (623 yards total yardage), 35 completions, and seven touchdowns in a single game, and a Division II record 3,757 regular season yards passing and 4,025 regular season yards in total offense, while also setting a school single-season records of most touchdowns. He passed for a 248/407 (60 percent) completion rate, was # 1 in Division II for total offense at a record 405.2 yards per game, was named an EC AC Div. II All-Star, 1st team, and Sports Illustrated's Division II Player of the Year. He played in the 1994 College All-Star Senior Bowl and passed for one touchdown.

== Professional career ==
Before the 1994 NFL draft, Klein outcompeted every other quarterback at the league's scouting combine. Nonetheless, the Stevens Point Journal only projected him as a fifth-round choice and as the eighth-best quarterback in the draft. Vinny Ditrani of The Record rated Klein the seventh-best quarterback, as the tenth-best by the Philadelphia Daily News, and as a likely fourth-round pick by the South Florida Sun-Sentinel, who rated Klein fifth-best. As a fourth-round draftee by the Atlanta Falcons, he would actually prove the third quarterback drafted, behind first-rounders Heath Shuler and Trent Dilfer. Klein won the No. 3 quarterback slot with the Falcons over Bob Gagliano. He stayed with the Falcons for two seasons. In 1996, he was waived by the team and played with the Amsterdam Admirals in the World Football League, which would become NFL Europe.

== Accolades ==
In 2008, Klein was inducted into the Southern California Jewish Sports Hall of Fame.
