= Gregory L. Dahl =

American lawyer

Gregory L. Dahl (born March 25, 1952) is an American lawyer and politician.

Dahl lived in White Bear Lake, Minnesota. He received his bachelor's degree from St. Olaf College and his J.D. degree from Stanford Law School. Dahl was admitted to the Minnesota law. He served in the Minnesota Senate from 1981 to 1992 and was a Democrat.
