= Banning Academies of Creative and Innovative Sciences =

Coordinates: 33.794468°N 118.261250°W

Location
- 1527 Lakme Avenue; Wilmington, California 90744; United States

Information
- School type: Public High School
- Opened: August 12, 2014
- Closed: June 9, 2017
- School district: Los Angeles Unified School District
- Superintendent: Ramon Cortines
- Principal: Paul Valanis

Banning Academies of Creative and Innovative Sciences (BACIS) was a high school in Wilmington, California. BACIS was one of two public high schools that are co-located on the Banning complex. BACIS was part of Los Angeles Unified School District.

BACIS was created as part of LAUSD's Public School Choice process, through which the School Board encouraged teacher teams to develop plans to restructure failing schools. As a chronically underperforming school, Banning was required to participate in the fourth round of Public School Choice, which concluded with Superintendent John Deasy approving the BACIS school plan. BACIS opened as a Small Learning Community in August 2013, and became an autonomous school in August 2014.

The school closed down on July 30, 2018.
