= White Bear Lake Area School District =

School district in Minnesota, United States

White Bear Lake Area Schools

Location
- Ramsey County, Minnesota United States
- Coordinates: 45.0889°N 93.0121°W

District information
- Type: Public
- Grades: PreK–12
- NCES District ID: 2742360

Other information
- Website: www.isd624.org

The White Bear Lake Area School District, abbreviated WBLAS, is a public school district located in Ramsey County, Minnesota. It provides academic and educational services to the cities of Birchwood, Gem Lake, Hugo, Lino Lakes, Little Canada, Maplewood, North Oaks, Vadnais Heights, White Bear Lake and White Bear Township. The District consists of nine elementary schools, two middle schools, a two-campus high school (White Bear Lake Area High School) and an Area Learning Center. The District also provides programs such as three locations for early childhood (birth-5), transition plus (special education 18-21) community services and senior programs. The school district covers a population of approximately 50,000 residents and provides services for nearly 9,000 students ranging from early childhood education to high school graduation to adult education and senior programs.

== White Bear Lake Area Schools ==
The District was recognized as a Top Performer in 2012 from the EPA for their portfolio of energy efficient buildings. Additionally, the White Bear Lake Area Educational Foundation works with the district to support instruction by providing grants for new projects.

=== Elementary schools ===
There are nine neighborhood elementary schools in the White Bear Lake Area School District. The schools offer art lessons from professional artists through the White Bear Center for the Arts, water safety lessons through the YMCA, and nature experiences in cooperation with regional nature centers. World language experiences is also offered at all grades; two schools offer Chinese, seven offer Spanish. Matoska International IB World School offers an International Baccalaureate Primary Years Program. A gifted program is also offered.

=== Middle schools ===
White Bear Lake Area middle schools, Central Middle School and Mariner middle school, offer world language and fine arts opportunities at each grade level,. Both are International Baccalaureate Candidate Schools for the Middle Years Program. (MYP).

=== White Bear Lake Area High School ===
White Bear Lake Area High School has a two-campus structure: WBLAHS - North Campus and WBLAHS - South Campus. WBLAHS's two-campus structure provides a wide range of opportunities available in a large school combined in a small faculty-student mentoring ratio. The students can choose from over 30 college-level course offerings through the University of Minnesota's College in the Schools (CIS), Advanced Placement (AP) and the University of Minnesota's Project Lead the Way (STEM) courses.

=== Special education ===
WBLAS's special education department offers individualized and comprehensive programs of instruction for students with special needs. The district also participates in a special education cooperative district, which serves students with special needs.

== Extra-curricular ==
Hundreds of WBLAS students are recognized each year for state- and national-level participation and accomplishments. The district's youth development programs have gained both state and national attention.

== Stewardship ==
White Bear Lake Area Schools has received Excellence in Financial Reporting awards from both the Association of School Business Officials and the Government Finance Officers Association for 13 consecutive years.
