= Courtney Hall =

American football player (1968–2021)

No. 53
- Positions: Center, guard

Personal information
- Born: August 26, 1968; Los Angeles, California, U.S.
- Died: April 29, 2021 (aged 52)
- Listed height: 6 ft 2 in (1.88 m)
- Listed weight: 281 lb (127 kg)

Career information
- High school: Banning (Los Angeles)
- College: Rice
- NFL draft: 1989: 2nd round, 37th overall pick

Career history
- San Diego Chargers (1989–1996); Denver Broncos (1998)*
- * Offseason or practice squad member only

Awards and highlights
- PFWA All-Rookie Team (1989); First-team All-SWC (1988)

Career NFL statistics
- Games played: 118
- Games started: 118
- Fumble recoveries: 3
- Stats at Pro Football Reference

Courtney Ceaser Hall (August 26, 1968 – April 29, 2021) was an American professional football player. He was a center and guard in the National Football League (NFL) for the San Diego Chargers.

== Early life ==
Hall played football at Banning High School in Wilmington, California, and was the starting offensive tackle his junior and senior years. His teammates included Jamelle Holieway, Leroy Holt, and Mark Tucker.

== College career ==
In 1985, aged 16, Courtney, a National Merit Scholarship semifinalist, graduated from high school and enrolled at Rice University. He played four years for the Rice Owls. In 1988, he played for a Rice team which compiled a 0-11 record, but he was still drafted very high, in the second round of the 1989 NFL draft: he was the #37 pick overall.

Hall graduated from Rice in 1990 with a dual degree in Economics and Managerial Studies.

== Professional career ==
=== San Diego Chargers ===
Hall played eight seasons for the San Diego Chargers from 1989 to 1996. When he made his NFL debut on September 10, 1989, he was just 21 years and 15 days old. He was the youngest regular player in the NFL that year.

He was a four-time Pro Bowler and captained the only Chargers football team to play in a Super Bowl. He was the starter in all 118 regular-season games and 6 playoff games in which he appeared. He missed half of the 1996 season because of injury, and was released in February 1997.

=== Denver Broncos ===
Hall was out of football for the entire 1997 season, but he signed a free agent contract with the Denver Broncos before the 1998 season. He was cut at the end of the pre-season.

== Later life ==
In 2003, he graduated with a joint J.D./M.B.A. degree from the University of Chicago Law School and the University of Chicago Booth School of Business. Hall also served on the Rice University Investment Committee, helping to manage the university's $4.5 billion endowment.

Hall was a managing partner of Hillcrest Venture Partners, a venture capital firm. He also served as New York City Mayor Michael Bloomberg's appointee to the New York City Campaign Finance Board.

The Texas Sports Hall of Fame inducted Hall into the Southwest Conference Hall of Fame in 2019.

He died unexpectedly on April 29, 2021, reportedly at his childhood home in Southern California. A specific cause of death was not announced. He was buried on Martha's Vineyard.

Courtney's widow is LaShann DeArcy Hall, an attorney and Federal judge for the Eastern District of New York.
