= Carson High School (Carson, California) =

Carson Senior High School

Location
- 22328 South Main Street; Carson, California 90745; 33.822497°N 118.274919°W

Information
- School type: Public, high school
- Motto: "Where Excellence Is the Expectation"
- Founded: 1963
- Locale: City, Small
- School district: Los Angeles Unified School District
- NCES District ID: 0622710
- NCES School ID: 062271002899
- Principal: Diana Faatai
- Teaching staff: 75.90 (on an FTE basis)
- Grades: 9–12
- Enrollment: 1,407 (2024–25)
  - Male: 797
  - Female: 609
- Student to teacher ratio: 18.54
- Language: English
- Colors: Black & Powder Blue
- Athletics conference: Marine League; CIF Los Angeles City Section
- Mascot: ️Colt
- Team name: Colts
- Rival: Banning High School
- Newspaper: The Trailblazer
- Feeder schools: Carnegie Middle School, Stephen White Middle School, Caroldale Learning Community (K-8)
- Affiliation: District 8
- Website: carsonhs.lausd.org

Carson High School is a four-year public high school in Carson, California, United States. It is situated in the District South area of the Los Angeles Unified School District. Carson High is located on the corner of 223rd Street and Main Street. Carson's rivalry with Banning High School in Wilmington, Los Angeles, California is one of the top high school rivalries in the South Bay region of Los Angeles. Enrollment at Carson High School for the 2024–25 academic year was 1,407 students.

== History ==
In 1964, Carson High admitted students from any location who wanted to attend if they provided their own transportation. This contributed to an enrollment increase to the point where The Daily Breeze stated that it was "one of the most rapidly growing schools" in LAUSD.

== Academies ==
Carson High School is made up of four learning academies:

- Environmental Science, Engineering & Technology (ESET)
- Global Business, Law & Government Academy (GBLG)
- Performing Arts & Media Academy (PAMA)
- The Musical Arts and Digital Arts Magnet (M.E.DI.A)

The school offers 10 Advanced Placement (AP) courses, as well as several extracurricular programs, which include MCJROTC (Marine Corps Junior Reserve Officers' Training Corps), Marching Blue Thunder (a combined color guard, marching band, and dance team), cheerleading, and drama.

== School profile ==
According to the California Department of Education, in the 2019–2020 school year, there were a total of 1,499 students attending Carson High Steam School, comprising the following ethnic origins.

- 54.7% Hispanic or Latino
- 17.2% African American
- 16.8% Filipino
- 3.9% Pacific Islander
- 2.9% White
- 2.7% Asian
- 0.1% Native American
- Teachers: 65
- Student-teacher ratio: 1:23

Most recent SAT participation rate is 63%, with an average score of 1065 (2019)

== Sports ==
- Quarterback Perry Klein helped the Colts win the 1988 City Section 4-A Division championship, as he was named California State Player of the Year, Parade Magazine High School All-America, and a Campbell Soup All-American.
- The Carson High School 'Marching Blue Thunder', consisting of Carson's marching band, drill team, color guard (tall flags), flaggies (short flags), and banner girls, won 6 consecutive LAUSD Band & Drill Team Championships in 1983, 1984, 1985, 1986, 1987, and 1988.
- The Carson Flaggies were featured in Gwen Stefani's "Hollaback Girl" video in 2005.

== Notable alumni ==
- Tony Caldwell, former NFL player
- Dave Canales, NFL head coach for the Carolina Panthers and former college football coach and player
- Ekene Ibekwe, professional overseas basketball player
- Ray J, singer, television personality
- Perry Klein, former NFL quarterback
- Ralph Mann, former Olympic athlete and world record holder
- Brian Treggs, former NFL player
