= Leroy Holt =

American football player (born 1967)

Profile
- Position: Fullback

Personal information
- Born: February 7, 1967 (age 59); Carson, California, U.S.
- Listed height: 6 ft 1 in (1.85 m)
- Listed weight: 230 lb (104 kg)

Career information
- High school: Wilmington (CA) Banning
- College: USC
- NFL draft: 1990: 5th round, 137th overall pick

Career history
- Miami Dolphins (1990-1991); Seattle Seahawks (1992)*
- * Offseason or practice squad member only

Awards and highlights
- First-team All-Pac-10 (1988)

Leroy Holt (born March 16, 1967) is an American former professional football player who was a fullback for the Miami Dolphins of the National Football League (NFL). He played college football for the USC Trojans and was selected by the Dolphins in the fifth round of the 1990 NFL draft.

== Early life ==
Holt attended Banning High School in Wilmington, California. He was a three-year letterman in football where he was starting fullback behind teammate Jamelle Holieway and ran through holes created by teammate Courtney Hall. He was named the California High School fullback of the Year as a senior.

== College career ==
Holt was the first USC fullback to start all four years. He broke Sam Cunningham's all-time records for rushing yards and carries without a fumble.

== Professional career ==
Holt was drafted in the fifth round with the 137th pick of the 1990 NFL draft by the Miami Dolphins. His career was shortened when he fractured a vertebra in his neck during the preseason in practice.
