= Barry Siegel =

American journalist

- Born: September 7, 1949 (age 76); St. Louis, Missouri, U.S.
- Occupation: Journalist
- Awards: Pulitzer Prize; Livingston Award
- Website: www.barry-siegel.com

Barry Siegel (born September 7, 1949) is an American journalist. He is a former national correspondent for the Los Angeles Times who won the Pulitzer Prize for Feature Writing in 2002 for his piece "A Father's Pain, a Judge's Duty, and a Justice Beyond Their Reach." In 2003, University of California, Irvine recruited Siegel to chair the school's new undergraduate degree program in literary journalism.

Siegel is the author of the true crime novel A Death in White Bear Lake, which is considered by many to be a seminal document regarding child abuse. He is also the author of Dreamers and Schemers: How an Improbable Bid for the 1932 Olympics Transformed Los Angeles from Dusty Outpost to Global Metropolis; Manifest Injustice; Claim of Privilege: A Mysterious Plane Crash, a Landmark Supreme Court Case, and the Rise of State Secrets; and a co-author of After Snowden: Privacy, Secrecy, and Security in the Information Age (with Ronald Goldfarb, Edward Wasserman, David D. Cole, Hodding Carter III, Thomas S. Blanton, and Jon L. Mills).

Siegel lives in Sherman Oaks and Irvine, California.

== Awards and honors ==
- 1984 Livingston Award for National Reporting for "El Nino: The World Turns Topsy-Turvy" (Los Angeles Times)
- 2002 Pulitzer Prize for Feature Writing for "A Father's Pain, a Judge's Duty, and a Justice Beyond Their Reach" (Los Angeles Times)
